= Associate international cricket in 2019–20 =

International cricket season

The 2019–20 Associate international cricket season was from September 2019 to April 2020. All official twenty over matches between Associate members of the ICC had full Twenty20 International (T20I) or Women's Twenty20 International (WT20I) status, as the International Cricket Council (ICC) granted T20I status to matches between all of its members from 1 July 2018 (women's teams) and 1 January 2019 (men's teams). The season included all T20I/WT20I cricket series mostly involving ICC Associate members, that were played in addition to series covered in International cricket in 2019–20. More than 75% of men's T20I matches in the 2019 calendar year featured Associate teams.

The COVID-19 pandemic impacted on several international cricket fixtures and tournaments. The first Associate international matches postponed included the ACA Africa T20 Cup Finals that had been due to be held in Kenya, the 2020 Malaysia Cricket World Cup Challenge League A and the 2020 United States Tri-Nation Series. On 24 March, ICC announced that all qualifying events scheduled to take place before 30 June had been postponed due to the pandemic, including the 2020 ICC T20 World Cup Africa Sub-regional Qualifier and the 2020 ICC T20 World Cup Asia Western Region Qualifier.

== Season overview ==
International tours
Start date	Home team	Away team	Results [Matches]
Start date	Home team	Away team	T20I
29 September 2019	Malaysia	Vanuatu	2–3 [5]
9 October 2019	Qatar	Jersey	3–0 [3]
6 November 2019	Malawi	Mozambique	5–1 [7]
12 February 2020	Qatar	Uganda	2–1 [3]
20 February 2020	Malaysia	Hong Kong	5–0 [5]
8 March 2020	Spain	Germany	1–1 [2]
18 April 2020 (Note: The series was postponed due to the COVID-19 pandemic.)	Belgium	Austria	[3]
26 April 2020 (Note: The series was postponed due to the COVID-19 pandemic.)	Belgium	Luxembourg	[2]
International tournaments
Start date	Tournament		Winners
3 October 2019	(Peru) 2019 South American Championship		Argentina
14 October 2019	(Greece) 2019 Hellenic Premier League		Bulgaria (Note: Bulgaria won the international tri-nation series which formed part of the Hellenic Premier League; Greece went on to win the overall Hellenic Premier League.)
17 October 2019	(Malta) 2019 Valletta Cup		Czech Republic
25 October 2019	(Spain) 2019 Iberia Cup		Spain
3 December 2019	(Nepal) 2019 South Asian Games		Bangladesh U23
23 February 2020	(Oman) 2020 ACC Western Region T20		United Arab Emirates
29 February 2020	(Thailand) 2020 ACC Eastern Region T20		Singapore
22 March 2020 (Note: The tournament was postponed due to the COVID-19 pandemic.)	(Kenya) 2020 ACA Africa T20 Cup		Postponed
16 April 2020 (Note: The tournament was postponed due to the COVID-19 pandemic.)	(Kuwait) 2020 ICC Men's T20 World Cup Asia Qualifier A		Postponed
17 April 2020 (Note: The tournament was cancelled due to the COVID-19 pandemic.)	(Belize) 2020 Central American Championship		Cancelled
27 April 2020 (Note: The tournament was postponed due to the COVID-19 pandemic.)	(South Africa) 2020 ICC Men's T20 World Cup Africa Sub-regional Qualifier		Postponed

Women's International tours
Start date	Home team	Away team	Results [Matches]	
Start date	Home team	Away team	WT20I	
4 September 2019	Rwanda	Nigeria	3–2 [5]	
6 November 2019	Malawi	Mozambique	4–3 [7]	
2 December 2019	Botswana	Kenya	1–4 [7]	
13 December 2019	Costa Rica	Belize	1–5 [6]	
21 December 2019	Philippines	Indonesia	0–4 [4]	
4 February 2020	Oman	Germany	0–4 [4]	
3 April 2020 (Note: The series was postponed due to the COVID-19 pandemic.)	Argentina	Brazil	[5]	
Women's international tournaments
Start date	Tournament			Winners
19 September 2019	(South Korea) 2019 Twenty20 East Asia Cup			China
3 October 2019	(Peru) 2019 South American Championship			Brazil
2 December 2019	(Nepal) 2019 South Asian Games			Bangladesh
17 January 2020	2020 Qatar Triangular Series			Kuwait

== September ==
=== Nigeria women in Rwanda ===
WT20I series
No.	Date	Home captain	Away captain	Venue	Result
WT20I 745	4 September	Sarah Uwera	Samantha Agazuma	Gahanga International Cricket Stadium, Kigali	Rwanda by 4 wickets
WT20I 746	4 September	Sarah Uwera	Samantha Agazuma	Gahanga International Cricket Stadium, Kigali	Tied (Rwanda awarded)
WT20I 751	6 September	Sarah Uwera	Samantha Agazuma	Gahanga International Cricket Stadium, Kigali	Nigeria by 13 runs
WT20I 752	6 September	Sarah Uwera	Samantha Agazuma	Gahanga International Cricket Stadium, Kigali	Nigeria by 1 run
WT20I 755	7 September	Sarah Uwera	Samantha Agazuma	Gahanga International Cricket Stadium, Kigali	Rwanda by 4 wickets

=== 2019 Women's Twenty20 East Asia Cup ===
Team	P	W	L	T	NR	Pts	NRR	Status
China	3	2	1	0	0	4	+1.768	Advanced to the Final
Hong Kong	3	2	1	0	0	4	+0.559	Advanced to the Final
Japan	3	2	1	0	0	4	–0.140	Advanced to the 3rd place play-off
South Korea	3	0	3	0	0	0	–2.167	Advanced to the 3rd place play-off

Group stage
No.	Date	Team 1	Captain 1	Team 2	Captain 2	Venue	Result
WT20I 761	19 September	South Korea	Seungmin Song	Japan	Mai Yanagida	Yeonhui Cricket Ground, Incheon	Japan by 12 runs
WT20I 762	19 September	China	Huang Zhuo	Hong Kong	Kary Chan	Yeonhui Cricket Ground, Incheon	Hong Kong by 5 runs
WT20I 763	20 September	Hong Kong	Kary Chan	Japan	Mai Yanagida	Yeonhui Cricket Ground, Incheon	Japan by 2 wickets
WT20I 764	20 September	South Korea	Seungmin Song	China	Huang Zhuo	Yeonhui Cricket Ground, Incheon	China by 81 runs
WT20I 765	21 September	South Korea	Seungmin Song	Hong Kong	Kary Chan	Yeonhui Cricket Ground, Incheon	Hong Kong by 37 runs
WT20I 766	21 September	China	Huang Zhuo	Japan	Mai Yanagida	Yeonhui Cricket Ground, Incheon	China by 5 wickets
Playoffs
WT20I 768	22 September	South Korea	Seungmin Song	Japan	Mai Yanagida	Yeonhui Cricket Ground, Incheon	Japan by 32 runs
WT20I 767	22 September	China	Huang Zhuo	Hong Kong	Kary Chan	Yeonhui Cricket Ground, Incheon	China by 14 runs

=== Vanuatu in Malaysia ===
No.	Date	Home captain	Away captain	Venue	Result
T20I 896	29 September	Virandeep Singh	Andrew Mansale	Kinrara Oval, Kuala Lumpur	Vanuatu by 17 runs
T20I 898	1–2 October	Virandeep Singh	Andrew Mansale	Kinrara Oval, Kuala Lumpur	Vanuatu by 51 runs
T20I 900	2 October	Virandeep Singh	Andrew Mansale	Kinrara Oval, Kuala Lumpur	Malaysia by 26 runs
T20I 901	3 October	Virandeep Singh	Andrew Mansale	Kinrara Oval, Kuala Lumpur	Vanuatu by 6 wickets
T20I 906	4 October	Virandeep Singh	Andrew Mansale	Kinrara Oval, Kuala Lumpur	Malaysia by 22 runs

== October ==
=== 2019 South American Cricket Championship – Men's tournament ===
Team	P	W	L	T	NR	Pts	NRR
Argentina	6	5	1	0	0	15	+0.713
Mexico	6	4	2	0	0	12	+0.756
Peru	6	4	2	0	0	12	+0.310
Colombia	6	2	4	0	0	6	+0.002
Uruguay	6	2	4	0	0	6	–0.167
Brazil	6	2	4	0	0	6	–0.355
Chile	6	2	4	0	0	6	–1.246

No.	Date	Team 1	Captain 1	Team 2	Captain 2	Venue	Result
T20I 903	3 October	Argentina	Hernán Fennell	Mexico	Tarun Sharma	El Cortijo Polo Club Pitch A Ground, Lima	Argentina by 9 wickets
2nd Match	3 October	Chile	Kamlesh Gupta	Uruguay	Boopathy Ravi	El Cortijo Polo Club, Lima	Uruguay by 1 wicket
3rd Match	3 October	Peru	Matthew Spry	Colombia		El Cortijo Polo Club, Lima	Peru by 8 wickets
T20I 904	3 October	Brazil	Greigor Caisley	Chile	Kamlesh Gupta	El Cortijo Polo Club Pitch B Ground, Lima	Brazil by 35 runs
5th Match	3 October	Mexico	Tarun Sharma	Uruguay	Boopathy Ravi	El Cortijo Polo Club, Lima	Mexico by 17 runs
T20I 905	3 October	Peru	Matthew Spry	Brazil	Greigor Caisley	El Cortijo Polo Club Pitch A Ground, Lima	Peru by 2 runs
7th Match	3 October	Argentina	Hernán Fennell	Colombia		El Cortijo Polo Club, Lima	Colombia by 8 wickets
T20I 907	4 October	Chile	Kamlesh Gupta	Mexico	Tarun Sharma	El Cortijo Polo Club Pitch A Ground, Lima	Chile by 4 wickets
9th Match	4 October	Brazil	Greigor Caisley	Uruguay	Boopathy Ravi	El Cortijo Polo Club, Lima	Brazil by 7 wickets
T20I 908	4 October	Peru	Matthew Spry	Argentina	Hernán Fennell	El Cortijo Polo Club Pitch B Ground, Lima	Argentina by 7 wickets
11th Match	4 October	Chile	Kamlesh Gupta	Colombia		El Cortijo Polo Club, Lima	Chile by 11 runs
T20I 909	4 October	Argentina	Hernán Fennell	Brazil	Greigor Caisley	El Cortijo Polo Club Pitch A Ground, Lima	Argentina by 29 runs
13th Match	4 October	Colombia		Mexico	Tarun Sharma	El Cortijo Polo Club, Lima	Mexico by 4 wickets
14th Match	4 October	Peru	Matthew Spry	Uruguay	Boopathy Ravi	El Cortijo Polo Club, Lima	Peru by 1 wicket
T20I 912	5 October	Argentina	Hernán Fennell	Chile	Kamlesh Gupta	El Cortijo Polo Club Pitch A Ground, Lima	Argentina by 28 runs
T20I 913	5 October	Peru	Matthew Spry	Mexico	Tarun Sharma	El Cortijo Polo Club Pitch B Ground, Lima	Mexico by 39 runs
17th Match	5 October	Colombia		Uruguay	Boopathy Ravi	El Cortijo Polo Club, Lima	Uruguay by 5 wickets
T20I 915	5 October	Peru	Matthew Spry	Chile	Kamlesh Gupta	El Cortijo Polo Club Pitch A Ground, Lima	Peru by 60 runs
19th Match	5 October	Brazil	Greigor Caisley	Colombia		El Cortijo Polo Club, Lima	Colombia by 13 runs
T20I 916	5 October	Brazil	Greigor Caisley	Mexico	Tarun Sharma	El Cortijo Polo Club Pitch B Ground, Lima	Mexico by 20 runs
21st Match	5 October	Argentina	Hernán Fennell	Uruguay	Boopathy Ravi	El Cortijo Polo Club, Lima	Argentina by 2 runs
Final
T20I 919	6 October	Argentina	Hernán Fennell	Mexico	Tarun Sharma	Lima Cricket and Football Club, Lima	Argentina by 4 wickets

=== 2019 South American Cricket Championship – Women's tournament ===
Team	P	W	L	T	NR	Pts	NRR	Status
Brazil	4	4	0	0	0	12	+5.024	Advanced to the final
Argentina	4	3	1	0	0	9	+2.803	Advanced to the final
Chile	4	2	2	0	0	6	–1.844	
Mexico	4	1	3	0	0	3	–3.840	
Peru	4	0	4	0	0	0	–5.188	

No.	Date	Team 1	Captain 1	Team 2	Captain 2	Venue	Result
WT20I 774	3 October	Peru	Milka Linares	Argentina	Veronica Vasquez	Lima Cricket and Football Club, Lima	Argentina by 92 runs
WT20I 776	3 October	Brazil	Roberta Moretti Avery	Chile	Jeannette Gonzalez	Lima Cricket and Football Club, Lima	Brazil by 9 wickets
WT20I 777	3 October	Argentina	Veronica Vasquez	Mexico	Caroline Owen	Lima Cricket and Football Club, Lima	Argentina by 129 runs
WT20I 778	4 October	Peru	Milka Linares	Brazil	Roberta Moretti Avery	Lima Cricket and Football Club, Lima	Brazil by 162 runs
WT20I 780	4 October	Chile	Jeannette Gonzalez	Mexico	Caroline Owen	Lima Cricket and Football Club, Lima	Chile by 5 wickets
WT20I 781	4 October	Argentina	Veronica Vasquez	Brazil	Roberta Moretti Avery	Lima Cricket and Football Club, Lima	Brazil by 6 wickets
WT20I 782	5 October	Peru	Milka Linares	Mexico	Caroline Owen	Lima Cricket and Football Club, Lima	Mexico by 19 runs
WT20I 783	5 October	Argentina	Veronica Vasquez	Chile	Jeannette Gonzalez	Lima Cricket and Football Club, Lima	Argentina by 8 wickets
WT20I 784	5 October	Brazil	Roberta Moretti Avery	Mexico	Caroline Owen	Lima Cricket and Football Club, Lima	Brazil by 98 runs
WT20I 785	6 October	Peru	Milka Linares	Chile	Jeannette Gonzalez	Lima Cricket and Football Club, Lima	Chile by 7 wickets
Final
WT20I 786	6 October	Argentina	Veronica Vasquez	Brazil	Roberta Moretti Avery	Lima Cricket and Football Club, Lima	Brazil by 4 wickets

=== Jersey in Qatar ===
No.	Date	Home captain	Away captain	Venue	Result
T20I 926	9 October	Iqbal Hussain	Dominic Blampied	West End Park International Cricket Stadium, Doha	Qatar by 20 runs
T20I 929	10 October	Iqbal Hussain	Charles Perchard	West End Park International Cricket Stadium, Doha	Qatar by 6 wickets
T20I 930	11 October	Iqbal Hussain	Dominic Blampied	West End Park International Cricket Stadium, Doha	Qatar by 8 wickets

=== 2019 Hellenic Premier League (international section) ===
No.	Date	Team 1	Captain 1	Team 2	Captain 2	Venue	Result
T20I 931	14 October	Bulgaria	Prakash Mishra	Serbia	Haris Dajc	Marina Ground, Corfu	Bulgaria by 6 wickets
T20I 932	15 October	Greece	Anastasios Manousis	Serbia	Haris Dajc	Marina Ground, Corfu	Greece by 10 wickets
T20I 933	16 October	Greece	Anastasios Manousis	Bulgaria	Prakash Mishra	Marina Ground, Corfu	Greece by 9 wickets
Final
T20I 938	18 October	Greece	Anastasios Manousis	Bulgaria	Prakash Mishra	Marsa Sports Club, Marsa	Bulgaria by 18 runs

=== 2019 Valletta Cup ===
No.	Date	Team 1	Captain 1	Team 2	Captain 2	Venue	Result
1st Match	17 October	Malta	Bikram Arora	Iceland	Nolan Williams	Marsa Sports Club, Marsa	Malta by 7 wickets
T20I 934	18 October	Malta	Bikram Arora	Czech Republic	Edward Knowles	Marsa Sports Club, Marsa	Czech Republic by 12 runs
3rd Match	18 October	Iceland	Nolan Williams	Hungary XI	Marc Ahuja	Marsa Sports Club, Marsa	Hungary XI by 5 wickets
4th Match	18 October	Czech Republic	Edward Knowles	Iceland	Nolan Williams	Marsa Sports Club, Marsa	Czech Republic by 83 runs
5th Match	19 October	Czech Republic	Edward Knowles	Hungary XI	Marc Ahuja	Marsa Sports Club, Marsa	Hungary XI by 7 wickets
6th Match	19 October	Malta	Bikram Arora	Hungary XI	Marc Ahuja	Marsa Sports Club, Marsa	Hungary XI by 5 wickets
Playoffs
T20I 945	20 October	Malta	Bikram Arora	Czech Republic	Edward Knowles	Marsa Sports Club, Marsa	Czech Republic by 82 runs
2nd Semi-final	20 October	Hungary XI	Marc Ahuja	Iceland	Nolan Williams	Marsa Sports Club, Marsa	Hungary XI by 9 wickets
Final	20 October	Czech Republic	Edward Knowles	Hungary XI	Marc Ahuja	Marsa Sports Club, Marsa	Czech Republic by 8 wickets

=== 2019 Iberia Cup ===
Team	P	W	L	T	NR	Pts	NRR
Spain	4	4	0	0	0	8	+1.627
Portugal	4	2	2	0	0	4	–0.595
Gibraltar	4	0	4	0	0	0	–0.969

No.	Date	Team 1	Captain 1	Team 2	Captain 2	Venue	Result
T20I 970	25 October	Spain	Christian Muñoz-Mills	Portugal	Paolo Buccimazza	La Manga Club, Cartagena	Spain by 8 wickets
T20I 973	26 October	Gibraltar	Matthew Hunter	Portugal	Paolo Buccimazza	La Manga Club, Cartagena	Portugal by 6 wickets
T20I 975	26 October	Spain	Christian Muñoz-Mills	Gibraltar	Matthew Hunter	La Manga Club, Cartagena	Spain by 8 wickets
T20I 976	26 October	Spain	Christian Muñoz-Mills	Portugal	Paolo Buccimazza	La Manga Club, Cartagena	Spain by 29 runs
T20I 981	27 October	Gibraltar	Matthew Hunter	Portugal	Paolo Buccimazza	La Manga Club, Cartagena	Portugal by 4 wickets
T20I 984	27 October	Spain	Christian Muñoz-Mills	Gibraltar	Matthew Hunter	La Manga Club, Cartagena	Spain by 6 wickets

== November ==
=== Mozambique in Malawi ===
Kwacha Cup – T20I series
No.	Date	Home captain	Away captain	Venue	Result
T20I 1003	6 November	Mohammed Abdulla	Kaleem Shah	Lilongwe Golf Club, Lilongwe	Malawi by 3 wickets
T20I 1004	6 November	Mohammed Abdulla	Kaleem Shah	Lilongwe Golf Club, Lilongwe	Malawi by 7 wickets
T20I 1005	7 November	Mohammed Abdulla	Kaleem Shah	Lilongwe Golf Club, Lilongwe	Malawi by 25 runs
T20I 1006	7 November	Mohammed Abdulla	Kaleem Shah	Lilongwe Golf Club, Lilongwe	Malawi by 4 wickets
T20I 1010	9 November	Mohammed Abdulla	Kaleem Shah	Indian Sports Club, Blantyre	Malawi by 15 runs
T20I 1011	9 November	Gift Kansonkho	Kaleem Shah	Indian Sports Club, Blantyre	No result
T20I 1013	10 November	Gift Kansonkho	Kaleem Shah	Saint Andrews International High School, Blantyre	Mozambique by 11 runs (DLS)

=== Mozambique women in Malawi ===
Kwacha Cup – WT20I series
No.	Date	Home captain	Away captain	Venue	Result
WT20I 790	6 November	Shahida Hussein	Olga Matsolo	Saint Andrews International High School, Blantyre	Malawi by 4 wickets
WT20I 791	6 November	Shahida Hussein	Olga Matsolo	Saint Andrews International High School, Blantyre	Mozambique by 47 runs
WT20I 792	7 November	Shahida Hussein	Olga Matsolo	Saint Andrews International High School, Blantyre	Malawi by 3 wickets
WT20I 793	7 November	Shahida Hussein	Olga Matsolo	Saint Andrews International High School, Blantyre	Mozambique by 18 runs
WT20I 794	8 November	Shahida Hussein	Olga Matsolo	Saint Andrews International High School, Blantyre	Mozambique by 8 wickets
WT20I 795	8 November	Shahida Hussein	Olga Matsolo	Saint Andrews International High School, Blantyre	Malawi by 2 wickets
WT20I 797	10 November	Shahida Hussein	Olga Matsolo	Saint Andrews International High School, Blantyre	Malawi by 4 runs

== December ==
=== Kenya women in Botswana ===
WT20I series
No.	Date	Home captain	Away captain	Venue	Result
WT20I 803	2 December	Goabilwe Matome	Daisy Njoroge	Botswana Cricket Association Oval 1, Gaborone	Kenya by 8 wickets
WT20I 804	3 December	Goabilwe Matome	Daisy Njoroge	Botswana Cricket Association Oval 1, Gaborone	Kenya by 9 wickets
WT20I 805	3 December	Goabilwe Matome	Daisy Njoroge	Botswana Cricket Association Oval 1, Gaborone	Botswana by 7 runs
WT20I 807a	5 December	Goabilwe Matome	Daisy Njoroge	Botswana Cricket Association Oval 1, Gaborone	Match abandoned
WT20I 808	5 December	Goabilwe Matome	Daisy Njoroge	Botswana Cricket Association Oval 1, Gaborone	Kenya by 11 runs
WT20I 809	6 December	Goabilwe Matome	Daisy Njoroge	Botswana Cricket Association Oval 1, Gaborone	Kenya won by 50 runs
WT20I 810a	7 December	Goabilwe Matome	Daisy Njoroge	Botswana Cricket Association Oval 1, Gaborone	Match abandoned

=== 2019 South Asian Games – Women's tournament ===
Team	P	W	L	T	NR	Pts	NRR
Bangladesh	3	3	0	0	0	6	+6.391
Sri Lanka U23	3	2	1	0	0	4	+4.667
Nepal	3	1	2	0	0	2	–0.355
Maldives	3	0	3	0	0	0	–12.627

- Top 2 advanced to the gold medal match
- Bottom 2 advanced to the bronze medal match

No.	Date	Team 1	Captain 1	Team 2	Captain 2	Venue	Result
WT20I 802	2 December	Nepal	Rubina Chhetry	Maldives	Zoona Mariyam	Pokhara Stadium, Pokhara	Nepal by 10 wickets
2nd Match	3 December	Bangladesh	Salma Khatun	Sri Lanka U23	Harshitha Madavi	Pokhara Stadium, Pokhara	Bangladesh by 7 wickets
WT20I 806	4 December	Nepal	Rubina Chhetry	Bangladesh	Salma Khatun	Pokhara Stadium, Pokhara	Bangladesh by 10 wickets
4th Match	4 December	Maldives	Zoona Mariyam	Sri Lanka U23	Harshitha Madavi	Pokhara Stadium, Pokhara	Sri Lanka U23 by 249 runs
WT20I 807	5 December	Bangladesh	Salma Khatun	Maldives	Zoona Mariyam	Pokhara Stadium, Pokhara	Bangladesh by 249 runs
6th Match	6 December	Nepal	Rubina Chhetry	Sri Lanka U23	Harshitha Madavi	Pokhara Stadium, Pokhara	Sri Lanka U23 by 41 runs
Medal matches
WT20I 810	7 December	Maldives	Zoona Mariyam	Nepal	Rubina Chhetry	Pokhara Stadium, Pokhara	Nepal by 10 wickets
Gold Medal	8 December	Bangladesh	Salma Khatun	Sri Lanka U23	Harshitha Madavi	Pokhara Stadium, Pokhara	Bangladesh by 2 runs

=== 2019 South Asian Games – Men's tournament ===
Pos	Team	Pld	W	L	T	NR	Pts	NRR
1	Sri Lanka U23	4	4	0	0	0	8	4.031
2	Bangladesh U-23	4	3	1	0	0	6	3.075
3	Nepal	4	2	2	0	0	4	2.159
4	Maldives	4	1	3	0	0	2	−3.339
5	Bhutan	4	0	4	0	0	0	−6.453

- advanced to the gold medal match
- advanced to the bronze medal match

No.	Date	Team 1	Captain 1	Team 2	Captain 2	Venue	Result
1st Match	3 December	Nepal	Gyanendra Malla	Sri Lanka U23	Charith Asalanka	TU Cricket Ground, Kirtipur	Sri Lanka U23 by 7 wickets
2nd Match	4 December	Bangladesh U23	Nazmul Hossain Shanto	Maldives	Mohamed Mahfooz	TU Cricket Ground, Kirtipur	Bangladesh U23 by 109 runs
3rd Match	4 December	Bhutan	Jigme Singye	Sri Lanka U23	Charith Asalanka	TU Cricket Ground, Kirtipur	Sri Lanka U23 by 173 runs
T20I 1018	5 December	Nepal	Gyanendra Malla	Bhutan	Jigme Singye	TU Cricket Ground, Kirtipur	Nepal by 141 runs
5th Match	5 December	Maldives	Mohamed Mahfooz	Sri Lanka U23	Charith Asalanka	TU Cricket Ground, Kirtipur	Sri Lanka U23 by 98 runs
6th Match	6 December	Bhutan	Jigme Singye	Bangladesh U23	Nazmul Hossain Shanto	TU Cricket Ground, Kirtipur	Bangladesh U23 by 10 wickets
T20I 1019	6 December	Nepal	Gyanendra Malla	Maldives	Mohamed Mahfooz	TU Cricket Ground, Kirtipur	Nepal by 84 runs
8th Match	7 December	Nepal	Gyanendra Malla	Bangladesh U23	Nazmul Hossain Shanto	TU Cricket Ground, Kirtipur	Bangladesh U23 by 44 runs
T20I 1021	7 December	Bhutan	Jigme Singye	Maldives	Mohamed Mahfooz	TU Cricket Ground, Kirtipur	Maldives by 8 wickets
10th Match	8 December	Bangladesh U23	Nazmul Hossain Shanto	Sri Lanka U23	Charith Asalanka	TU Cricket Ground, Kirtipur	Sri Lanka U23 by 9 wickets
Medal matches
T20I 1023	9 December	Nepal	Gyanendra Malla	Maldives	Mohamed Mahfooz	TU Cricket Ground, Kirtipur	Nepal by 5 wickets
Gold Medal	9 December	Bangladesh U23	Nazmul Hossain Shanto	Sri Lanka U23	Charith Asalanka	TU Cricket Ground, Kirtipur	Bangladesh U23 by 7 wickets

=== Belize women in Costa Rica ===
WT20I series
No.	Date	Home captain	Away captain	Venue	Result
WT20I 811	13 December	Mercia Lewis	Dian Baldwin	Los Reyes Polo Club, Guácima	Belize by 63 runs
WT20I 812	13 December	Mercia Lewis	Dian Baldwin	Los Reyes Polo Club, Guácima	Belize by 9 wickets
WT20I 813	14 December	Mercia Lewis	Dian Baldwin	Los Reyes Polo Club, Guácima	Belize by 92 runs
WT20I 814	14 December	Mercia Lewis	Dian Baldwin	Los Reyes Polo Club, Guácima	Costa Rica by 6 runs
WT20I 815	15 December	Mercia Lewis	Arden Stephenson	Los Reyes Polo Club, Guácima	Belize by 3 wickets
WT20I 816	15 December	Wendy Delgado	Dian Baldwin	Los Reyes Polo Club, Guácima	Belize by 4 wickets

=== Indonesia women in the Philippines ===
WT20I series
No.	Date	Home captain	Away captain	Venue	Result
WT20I 820	21 December	Josie Arimas	Yulia Anggraeni	Friendship Oval, Dasmariñas	Indonesia by 10 wickets
WT20I 821	21 December	Josie Arimas	Yulia Anggraeni	Friendship Oval, Dasmariñas	Indonesia by 182 runs
WT20I 822	22 December	Josie Arimas	Yulia Anggraeni	Friendship Oval, Dasmariñas	Indonesia by 187 runs
WT20I 823	22 December	Josie Arimas	Yulia Anggraeni	Friendship Oval, Dasmariñas	Indonesia by 10 wickets

== January ==
=== 2020 Qatar Women's T20I Triangular Series ===
Team	P	W	L	T	NR	Pts	NRR
Oman	4	3	1	0	0	6	+0.777
Kuwait	4	2	2	0	0	4	+0.179
Qatar	4	1	3	0	0	2	–0.966

Group stage
No.	Date	Team 1	Captain 1	Team 2	Captain 2	Venue	Result
WT20I 824	17 January	Qatar	Aysha	Oman	Vaishali Jesrani	West End Park International Cricket Stadium, Doha	Oman by 3 runs
WT20I 825	17 January	Qatar	Aysha	Kuwait	Amna Tariq	West End Park International Cricket Stadium, Doha	Qatar by 1 wicket
WT20I 826	18 January	Kuwait	Amna Tariq	Oman	Vaishali Jesrani	West End Park International Cricket Stadium, Doha	Kuwait by 8 wickets
WT20I 827	18 January	Qatar	Aysha	Oman	Vaishali Jesrani	West End Park International Cricket Stadium, Doha	Oman by 61 runs
WT20I 828	19 January	Qatar	Aysha	Kuwait	Amna Tariq	West End Park International Cricket Stadium, Doha	Kuwait by 7 wickets
WT20I 829	19 January	Kuwait	Amna Tariq	Oman	Vaishali Jesrani	West End Park International Cricket Stadium, Doha	Oman by 3 runs
Final
WT20I 830	21 January	Kuwait	Amna Tariq	Oman	Vaishali Jesrani	West End Park International Cricket Stadium, Doha	Kuwait by 7 wickets

== February ==
=== Germany women in Oman ===
WT20I series
No.	Date	Home captain	Away captain	Venue	Result
WT20I 835	4 February	Vaishali Jesrani	Anuradha Doddaballapur	Oman Cricket Academy Ground Turf 1, Muscat	Germany by 115 runs
WT20I 836	5 February	Vaishali Jesrani	Anuradha Doddaballapur	Oman Cricket Academy Ground Turf 1, Muscat	Germany by 6 wickets
WT20I 839	7 February	Vaishali Jesrani	Anuradha Doddaballapur	Oman Cricket Academy Ground Turf 1, Muscat	Germany by 19 runs
WT20I 841	8 February	Vaishali Jesrani	Anuradha Doddaballapur	Oman Cricket Academy Ground Turf 1, Muscat	Germany by 23 runs

=== Uganda in Qatar ===
T20I series
No.	Date	Home captain	Away captain	Venue	Result
T20I 1038	12 February	Iqbal Hussain	Arnold Otwani	West End Park International Cricket Stadium, Doha	Qatar by 40 runs
T20I 1040	13 February	Iqbal Hussain	Arnold Otwani	West End Park International Cricket Stadium, Doha	Qatar by 28 runs
T20I 1042	15 February	Iqbal Hussain	Arnold Otwani	West End Park International Cricket Stadium, Doha	Uganda by 18 runs

=== Hong Kong in Malaysia ===
Interport T20I series
No.	Date	Home captain	Away captain	Venue	Result
T20I 1044	20 February	Ahmad Faiz	Aizaz Khan	Kinrara Oval, Kuala Lumpur	Malaysia by 21 runs (DLS)
T20I 1045	21 February	Ahmad Faiz	Aizaz Khan	Kinrara Oval, Kuala Lumpur	Malaysia by 35 runs
T20I 1051	23 February	Ahmad Faiz	Aizaz Khan	Kinrara Oval, Kuala Lumpur	Malaysia by 8 runs
T20I 1055	24 February	Ahmad Faiz	Aizaz Khan	Kinrara Oval, Kuala Lumpur	Malaysia by 13 runs
T20I 1062	26 February	Virandeep Singh	Aizaz Khan	Kinrara Oval, Kuala Lumpur	Malaysia by 6 Wickets

=== 2020 ACC Western Region T20 ===
Pos	Team	Pld	W	L	T	NR	Pts	NRR
1	Bahrain	3	2	1	0	0	4	1.461
2	Qatar	3	2	1	0	0	4	1.391
3	Oman	3	2	1	0	0	4	1.040
4	Maldives	3	0	3	0	0	0	−3.793

Source: ESPNcricinfo

Advance to semi-finals

Pos	Team	Pld	W	L	T	NR	Pts	NRR
1	United Arab Emirates	3	3	0	0	0	6	3.114
2	Kuwait	3	2	1	0	0	4	1.539
3	Saudi Arabia	3	1	2	0	0	2	0.489
4	Iran	3	0	3	0	0	0	−6.221

Source: ESPNcricinfo

Advance to semi-finals

Group stage
No.	Date	Team 1	Captain 1	Team 2	Captain 2	Venue	Result
T20I 1047	23 February	Iran	Dad Dahani	United Arab Emirates	Ahmed Raza	Oman Cricket Academy Ground Turf 2, Muscat	United Arab Emirates by 10 wickets
T20I 1048	23 February	Maldives	Mohamed Azzam	Qatar	Iqbal Hussain	Oman Cricket Academy Ground Turf 1, Muscat	Qatar by 106 runs
T20I 1049	23 February	Kuwait	Mohammed Aslam	Saudi Arabia	Shoaib Ali	Oman Cricket Academy Ground Turf 2, Muscat	Kuwait by 9 wickets
T20I 1050	23 February	Oman	Khawar Ali	Bahrain	Anasim Khan	Oman Cricket Academy Ground Turf 1, Muscat	Oman by 8 wickets
T20I 1053	24 February	Iran	Dad Dahani	Saudi Arabia	Shoaib Ali	Oman Cricket Academy Ground Turf 1, Muscat	Saudi Arabia by 9 wickets
T20I 1054	24 February	Oman	Zeeshan Maqsood	Qatar	Iqbal Hussain	Oman Cricket Academy Ground Turf 2, Muscat	Qatar by 34 runs
T20I 1056	24 February	Bahrain	Anasim Khan	Maldives	Mohamed Azzam	Oman Cricket Academy Ground Turf 2, Muscat	Bahrain by 65 runs
T20I 1057	24 February	Kuwait	Mohammed Aslam	United Arab Emirates	Ahmed Raza	Oman Cricket Academy Ground Turf 1, Muscat	United Arab Emirates by 47 runs
T20I 1058	25 February	Oman	Zeeshan Maqsood	Maldives	Mohamed Azzam	Oman Cricket Academy Ground Turf 1, Muscat	Oman by 10 wickets
T20I 1059	25 February	Saudi Arabia	Shoaib Ali	United Arab Emirates	Ahmed Raza	Oman Cricket Academy Ground Turf 2, Muscat	United Arab Emirates by 12 runs
T20I 1060	25 February	Bahrain	Anasim Khan	Qatar	Iqbal Hussain	Oman Cricket Academy Ground Turf 1, Muscat	Bahrain by 6 wickets
T20I 1061	25 February	Iran	Dad Dahani	Kuwait	Mohammed Aslam	Oman Cricket Academy Ground Turf 2, Muscat	Kuwait by 8 wickets
Playoffs
T20I 1063	26 February	Bahrain	Anasim Khan	Kuwait	Mohammed Aslam	Oman Cricket Academy Ground Turf 1, Muscat	Kuwait by 87 runs
T20I 1064	26 February	Qatar	Iqbal Hussain	United Arab Emirates	Ahmed Raza	Oman Cricket Academy Ground Turf 2, Muscat	United Arab Emirates by 28 runs
T20I 1066	27 February	Kuwait	Mohammed Aslam	United Arab Emirates	Ahmed Raza	Oman Cricket Academy Ground Turf 1, Muscat	United Arab Emirates by 102 runs

=== 2020 ACC Eastern Region T20 ===
Pos	Team	Pld	W	L	T	NR	Pts	NRR
1	Singapore	4	3	0	0	1	7	3.117
2	Hong Kong	4	3	1	0	0	6	1.674
3	Malaysia	4	2	2	0	0	4	−0.748
4	Nepal	4	1	2	0	1	3	0.690
5	Thailand	4	0	4	0	0	0	−4.283

Source: ESPNcricinfo

Advance to Asia Cup Qualifier

Group stage
No.	Date	Team 1	Captain 1	Team 2	Captain 2	Venue	Result
T20I 1067	29 February	Thailand	Vichanath Singh	Singapore	Amjad Mahboob	Terdthai Cricket Ground, Bangkok	Singapore by 43 runs
T20I 1068	29 February	Malaysia	Ahmad Faiz	Nepal	Gyanendra Malla	Terdthai Cricket Ground, Bangkok	Malaysia by 22 runs
T20I 1069	1 March	Hong Kong	Aizaz Khan	Nepal	Gyanendra Malla	Terdthai Cricket Ground, Bangkok	Hong Kong by 43 runs
T20I 1070	1 March	Thailand	Vichanath Singh	Malaysia	Ahmad Faiz	Terdthai Cricket Ground, Bangkok	Malaysia by 8 wickets
T20I 1071	3 March	Malaysia	Ahmad Faiz	Singapore	Amjad Mahboob	Terdthai Cricket Ground, Bangkok	Singapore by 128 runs
T20I 1072	3 March	Thailand	Vichanath Singh	Hong Kong	Aizaz Khan	Terdthai Cricket Ground, Bangkok	Hong Kong by 8 wickets
T20I 1073	4 March	Thailand	Vichanath Singh	Nepal	Gyanendra Malla	Terdthai Cricket Ground, Bangkok	Nepal by 9 wickets
T20I 1074	4 March	Hong Kong	Aizaz Khan	Singapore	Amjad Mahboob	Terdthai Cricket Ground, Bangkok	Singapore by 16 runs
T20I 1075a	6 March	Nepal	Gyanendra Malla	Singapore	Amjad Mahboob	Terdthai Cricket Ground, Bangkok	Match abandoned
T20I 1076	6 March	Hong Kong	Aizaz Khan	Malaysia	Ahmad Faiz	Terdthai Cricket Ground, Bangkok	Hong Kong by 6 wickets

== March ==
=== Germany in Spain ===
No.	Date	Home captain	Away captain	Venue	Result
T20I 1080	8 March	Christian Munoz-Mills	Venkatraman Ganesan	Desert Springs Cricket Ground, Almería	Spain by 9 wickets
T20I 1081	8 March	Christian Munoz-Mills	Venkatraman Ganesan	Desert Springs Cricket Ground, Almería	Germany by 58 runs

=== 2020 ACA Africa T20 Cup ===
The tournament was postponed in March 2020 due to the COVID-19 pandemic.

== April ==
=== Brazil women in Argentina ===
The series was postponed in March 2020 due to the COVID-19 pandemic.

=== 2020 ICC T20 World Cup Asia Qualifier A ===
The series was postponed in March 2020 due to the COVID-19 pandemic.

=== 2020 Central American Cricket Championship ===
The tournament was cancelled due to the COVID-19 pandemic.

=== Austria in Belgium ===
The series was postponed in March 2020 due to the COVID-19 pandemic.

=== 2020 ICC T20 World Cup Africa Sub-regional Qualifier ===
The series was postponed in March 2020 due to the coronavirus pandemic.

=== Luxembourg in Belgium ===
The series was postponed in March 2020 due to the COVID-19 pandemic.

== See also ==
- International cricket in 2019–20
- Impact of the COVID-19 pandemic on cricket
