= 2019 South American Cricket Championship =

- Dates: 3 – 6 October 2019
- Cricket format: Twenty20 International
- Host: Peru
- Champions: Argentina (men's); Brazil (women's)
- Participants: 7 (men's); 5 (women's)
- Matches: 33 (22 men's, 11 women's)
- Player of the series: (Chile) Hirenkumar Patel (men's) (Peru) Samantha Hickman (women's)
- Most runs: (Chile) Hirenkumar Patel (129) (men's) (Brazil) Roberta Moretti Avery (116) (women's)
- Most wickets: (Chile) Hirenkumar Patel (14) (men's) (Argentina) Alison Stocks (8) (Brazil) Nicole Monteiro (8) (Peru) Samantha Hickman (8) (women's)

The 2019 South American Cricket Championship was a cricket tournament held in Lima, Peru from 3 to 6 October 2019. A men's and a women's tournament were held, with 2019 being the sixteenth edition of the men's South American Cricket Championship and the ninth edition of the women's event. Most matches played at the 2018 women's championship were granted Twenty20 International (T20I) status, and 2019 was the first time that matches in the men's event had the full T20I status, since the ICC granted Twenty20 International (T20I) status to matches between all of its Members. Mexico were the defending men's champions, while Brazil won the 2018 women's event.

Brazil retained the women's title with a 100% records during the tournament, including a four-wicket win against Argentina in the final.

== Participating teams ==
Men:

- Argentina
- Brazil
- Chile
- Colombia
- Mexico
- Peru
- Uruguay

Women:

- Argentina
- Brazil
- Chile
- Mexico
- Peru

== Men's championship ==
The seven participating teams were the national sides of Peru, Argentina, Brazil, Chile, Colombia, Mexico and Uruguay. Colombia and Uruguay were not Associate Members of the ICC and so matches involving either of these teams did not have T20I status.

=== Points table ===
Team	P	W	L	T	NR	Pts	NRR
Argentina	6	5	1	0	0	15	+0.713
Mexico	6	4	2	0	0	12	+0.756
Peru	6	4	2	0	0	12	+0.310
Colombia	6	2	4	0	0	6	+0.002
Uruguay	6	2	4	0	0	6	–0.167
Brazil	6	2	4	0	0	6	–0.355
Chile	6	2	4	0	0	6	–1.246

=== Final ===
6 October 2019
15:00
Scorecard

Mexico; 105/9 (20 overs)	v	Argentina; 111/6 (18.4 overs)
Shashikant Hirugade 35 (25); Jonathan Hurley 3/13 (4 overs)		Martín Siri 27 (25); Shashikant Hirugade 2/14 (3 overs)

Argentina won by 4 wickets
Lima Cricket and Football Club, Lima
Umpires: Oscar Andrade (Ber) and Deepak Kumar (Can)

- Mexico won the toss and elected to bat.

== Women's championship ==
The five participating teams were the national women's sides of Peru, Argentina, Brazil, Chile and Mexico. All of these teams were Associate Members of the ICC and so all matches had T20I status, subject to player-eligibility criteria.

=== Points table ===
Team	P	W	L	T	NR	Pts	NRR	Status
Brazil	4	4	0	0	0	12	+5.024	Advanced to the final
Argentina	4	3	1	0	0	9	+2.803	Advanced to the final
Chile	4	2	2	0	0	6	–1.844	
Mexico	4	1	3	0	0	3	–3.840	
Peru	4	0	4	0	0	0	–5.188	

=== Final ===
6 October 2019
11:30
Scorecard

Argentina; 73 (16.1 overs)	v	Brazil; 74/6 (17 overs)
Verónica Vásquez 26 (38); Nicole Monteiro 4/15 (4 overs)		Renata Souza 17 (39); Mariana Martinez 2/17 (4 overs)

Brazil won by 4 wickets
Lima Cricket and Football Club, Lima
Umpires: Sandeep Harnal (Can) and Ashish Shah (Can)

- Brazil won the toss and elected to field.
