= 2022 Women's South American Cricket Championship =

- Dates: 13 – 16 October 2022
- Cricket format: Twenty20 International
- Tournament format(s): Round-robin and Play-offs
- Host: Brazil
- Champions: Canada XI (Note: Canada's matches only counted towards the "Americas Championship". Brazil won the South American Championships (their 5th title) due to finishing above Argentina and Peru in the round-robin stage.) (1st title)
- Runners-up: Brazil
- Participants: 4
- Matches: 8
- Player of the series: (Canada) Divya Saxena
- Most runs: (Brazil) Roberta Moretti Avery (201)
- Most wickets: (Argentina) Alison Stocks (9)

The 2022 Women's South American Cricket Championship was a cricket tournament held in Itaguaí, Brazil from 13 to 16 October 2022. This was the twelfth edition of the women's South American Cricket Championship, and the third in which the matches were eligible for WT20I status since the ICC granted Twenty20 International (T20I) status to matches between all of its members.

The four participating teams this year were the national sides of hosts Brazil, along with Argentina, Peru and for the first time Canada. Brazil were the defending champions having won the event in 2019. Canada's matches did not have official T20I status in this tournament.

Tournaments for under-15s and under-19s took place earlier in October 2022, and the Men's South American Championship followed the women's event.

== Squads ==
Argentina	Brazil	Canada XI	Peru
Alison Stocks (c); Tamara Basile; Maria Castiñeiras; Julieta Cullen; Martina Del Valle (wk); Albertina Galan; Malena Lollo (wk); Mariana Martinez; Naara Patron Fuentes; Alison Prince; Constanza Sosa; Lucia Taylor; Veronica Vasquez	Roberta Moretti Avery (c); Lindsay Vilas Boas (vc, wk); Laura Agatha; Marianne Artur; Laura Cardoso; Renata de Sousa; Monnike Machado (wk); Nicole Monteiro; Evelyn Müller; Carolina Nascimento; Laira Ribeiro Bento; Maria Ribeiro; Ana Sabino; Maria Silva	Divya Saxena (c); Hala Azmat; Rey Blais (wk); Mannat Hundal; Krima Kapadia; Amarpal Kaur; Danielle McGahey; Rhea Misra (wk); Achini Perera; Kainat Qazi; Rabbjyot Rajput; Hiba Shamshad; Diya Trivedi; Vijayani Vithanage; Sana Zafar (wk)	Milka Linares (c); Evelyn Armas (wk); Erika Bustamente Saavedra; Stacy Diaz; Olivia Espinoza; Samantha Hickman; Cinthia Horna; Pierina Kelzy de Ortiz; Julissa Li; Milka Linares Flores; Angiella Rutti; Sisi Varillas Atencio; Maria Vera

== Warm-up matches ==
11 October 2022
09:30
Scorecard

Canada XI; 136/5 (20 overs)	v	Brazil; 133/4 (20 overs)
Divya Saxena 44 (41); Renata de Sousa 2/20 (4 overs)		Lindsay Vilas Boas 70* (64); Hiba Shamshad 1/17 (3 overs)

Canada XI won by 3 runs
Sao Fernando Polo and Cricket Club, Itaguaí
Player of the match: Lindsay Vilas Boas (Bra)

- Brazil won the toss and elected to field.

11 October 2022
14:00
Scorecard

Canada XI; 107/8 (20 overs)	v	Brazil; 108/5 (18.3 overs)
Divya Saxena 51 (44); Caroline Nascimento 2/10 (3 overs)		Roberta Moretti Avery 46* (55); Hiba Shamshad 2/16 (3 overs)

Brazil won by 5 wickets
Sao Fernando Polo and Cricket Club, Itaguaí
Player of the match: Renata de Sousa (Bra)

- Canada XI won the toss and elected to bat.

== Round-robin ==
=== Points table ===
Pos	Team	Pld	W	L	NR	Pts	NRR	Qualification
1	Canada XI	3	3	0	0	6	5.164	Advanced to the final
2	Brazil	3	2	1	0	4	2.971	Advanced to the final
3	Argentina	3	1	2	0	2	−0.357	Advanced to the 3rd place play-off
4	Peru	3	0	3	0	0	−10.406	Advanced to the 3rd place play-off

Source: ESPNcricinfo

=== Fixtures ===
13 October 2022
09:30
Scorecard

Canada XI; 181/3 (20 overs)	v	Argentina; 69 (17.1 overs)
Divya Saxena 82 (46); Tamara Basile 2/30 (4 overs)		Maria Castiñeiras 12 (24); Hiba Shamshad 3/10 (4 overs)

Canada XI won by 112 runs
Sao Fernando Polo and Cricket Club, Itaguaí
Player of the match: Divya Saxena (Can)

- Canada XI won the toss and elected to bat.

13 October 2022
13:30
Scorecard

Brazil; 235/2 (20 overs)	v	Peru; 33/6 (20 overs)
Roberta Moretti Avery 77* (46); Pierina Kelzy de Ortiz 1/50 (4 overs)		Samantha Hickman 8* (52); Renata de Sousa 2/4 (2 overs)

Brazil won by 202 runs
Sao Fernando Polo and Cricket Club, Itaguaí
Umpires: Amol Bhatt (Mex) and Emmerson Carrington (Ber)
Player of the match: Roberta Moretti Avery (Bra)

- Peru won the toss and elected to field.
- Monnike Machado, Laira Ribeiro Bento (Bra), Erika Bustamente Saavedra, Pierina Kelzy de Ortiz, Milka Linares Flores and Sisi Varillas Atencio (Per) all made their WT20I debuts.

14 October 2022
09:30
Scorecard

Canada XI; 177/3 (20 overs)	v	Brazil; 132/5 (20 overs)
Danielle McGahey 73 (46); Nicole Monteiro 1/26 (4 overs)		Roberta Moretti Avery 63* (60); Hala Azmat 1/13 (1 over)

Canada XI won by 45 runs
Sao Fernando Polo and Cricket Club, Itaguaí
Player of the match: Danielle McGahey (Can)

- Canada XI won the toss and elected to bat.

14 October 2022
14:00
Scorecard

Peru; 31 (15.4 overs)	v	Argentina; 35/0 (2 overs)
Samantha Hickman 15* (35); Alison Stocks 7/3 (3.4 overs)		Veronica Vasquez 13* (8)

Argentina won by 10 wickets
Sao Fernando Polo and Cricket Club, Itaguaí
Umpires: Steven Caines (Ber) and Emmerson Carrington (Ber)
Player of the match: Alison Stocks (Arg)

- Peru won the toss and elected to bat.
- Alison Prince (Arg) made their WT20I debuts.
- Alison Stocks became the first cricketer for Argentina to take a five-wicket haul in WT20Is, and equalled the best figures in a WT20I.

15 October 2022
09:30
Scorecard

Argentina; 133/5 (20 overs)	v	Brazil; 134/2 (17.4 overs)
Alison Prince 42 (30); Nicole Monteiro 2/20 (3 overs)		Roberta Moretti Avery 52* (51); Mariana Martinez 1/33 (4 overs)

Brazil won by 8 wickets
Sao Fernando Polo and Cricket Club, Itaguaí
Umpires: Oscar Andrade (Ber) and Arnold Maddela (Can)
Player of the match: Roberta Moretti Avery (Bra)

- Brazil won the toss and elected to field.
- Naara Patron Fuentes (Arg) made her WT20I debut.

15 October 2022
14:00
Scorecard

Peru; 34 (19.2 overs)	v	Canada XI; 37/0 (3.3 overs)
Milka Linares 10 (43); Achini Perera 3/4 (2.2 overs)		Rey Blais 18* (11)

Canada XI won by 10 wickets
Sao Fernando Polo and Cricket Club, Itaguaí
Player of the match: Mannat Hundal (Can)

- Peru won the toss and elected to bat.

== Play-offs ==
=== 3rd-place play-off ===
16 October 2022
09:00
Scorecard

Argentina; 226/4 (20 overs)	v	Peru; 44/3 (20 overs)
Veronica Vasquez 69 (63); Samantha Hickman 1/41 (4 overs)		Milka Linares 14* (51); Alison Stocks 1/3 (3 overs)

Argentina won by 182 runs
Sao Fernando Polo and Cricket Club (Campo Sede), Itaguaí
Umpires: Steven Caines (Ber) and Arnold Maddela (Can)
Player of the match: Veronica Vasquez (Arg)

- Peru won the toss and elected to field.

=== Final ===
16 October 2022
10:00
Scorecard

Canada XI; 125 (19.1 overs)	v	Brazil; 89 (17 overs)
Divya Saxena 42 (36); Carolina Nascimento 4/9 (3.1 overs)		Renata de Sousa 35* (28); Divya Saxena 4/15 (4 overs)

Canada XI won by 36 runs
Sao Fernando Polo and Cricket Club, Itaguaí
Player of the match: Divya Saxena (Can)

- Brazil won the toss and elected to field.

== See also ==
- 2022 Men's South American Cricket Championship
