= 2023 Women's T20 World Cup Americas Qualifier =

International cricket tournament

2023 ICC Women's T20 World Cup Americas Qualifier
- Dates: 4 – 11 September 2023
- Administrator(s): ICC Americas
- Cricket format: Twenty20 International
- Tournament format(s): Double round-robin
- Host(s): United States
- Champions: United States
- Runners-up: Canada
- Participants: 4
- Matches: 12
- Player of the series: (Canada) Amarpal Kaur
- Most runs: (Canada) Divya Saxena (174)
- Most wickets: (Canada) Amarpal Kaur (15) (United States) Isani Vaghela (15)

The 2023 ICC Women's T20 World Cup Americas Qualifier was a cricket tournament that formed part of the qualification process for the 2024 ICC Women's T20 World Cup. The Americas qualifier was held in the United States from 4 to 11 September 2023, and the top team in the tournament progressed to the global qualifier.

Canada included transgender cricketer Danielle McGahey in their squad. McGahey became the first transgender person to play in an official international cricket match, when she made her debut against Brazil on the opening day of the tournament.

United States progressed to the global qualifier after remaining unbeaten throughout the tournament.

== Squads ==
Argentina	Brazil	Canada	United States
Alison Stocks (c); Veronica Vasquez (vc); Tamara Basile; Maria Castiñeiras; Julieta Cullen; Alina Emch; Albertina Galan; Catalina Greloni; Malena Lollo (wk); Mariana Martinez; Naara Patron Fuentes (wk); Alison Prince; Constanza Sosa; Lucia Taylor	Roberta Moretti Avery (c); Lindsay Vilas Boas (vc); Laura Agatha; Marianne Artur; Laura Cardoso; Renata de Sousa; Mayara dos Santos (wk); Monnike Machado (wk); Evelyn Muller; Nicole Monteiro; Carolina Nascimento; Maria Ribeiro; Ana Sabino; Maria Silva	Divya Saxena (c); Amarpal Kaur (vc); Habeeba Bader (wk); Nicole Gallagher; Mannat Hundal; Krima Kapadia; Danielle McGahey; Rhea Misra; Achini Perera; Rabbjyot Rajput; Kainat Qazi; Vijayani Vithanage; Sana Zafar (wk); Saniyah Zia	Sindhu Sriharsha (c, wk); Geetika Kodali (vc); Jivana Aras; Aditiba Chudasama; Gargi Bhogle; Disha Dhingra; Uzma Iftikhar; Anika Kolan; Chetna Pagydyala; Ritu Singh; Suhani Thadani; Isani Vaghela; Onika Wallerson; Jessica Willathgamuwa

== Points table ==
Pos	Team	Pld	W	L	NR	Pts	NRR	Qualification
1	United States	6	6	0	0	12	2.674	Advanced to the global qualifier
2	Canada	6	4	2	0	8	1.508	
3	Brazil	6	2	4	0	4	−0.903	
4	Argentina	6	0	6	0	0	−3.170	

Source: ESPNcricinfo

== Fixtures ==
4 September 2023
09:30
Scorecard

United States; 132/1 (20 overs)	v	Argentina; 53 (17.3 overs)
Disha Dhingra 63* (52); Mariana Martinez 1/23 (4 overs)		Mariana Martinez 12 (20); Isani Vaghela 4/7 (4 overs)

United States won by 79 runs
Woodley Cricket Field, Los Angeles
Umpires: Arnold Maddela (Can) and Billy Taylor (USA)
Player of the match: Isani Vaghela (USA)

- Argentina won the toss and elected to field.
- Aditiba Chudasama, Chetna Pagydyala and Jessica Willathgamuwa (USA) all made their T20I debuts.

4 September 2023
14:00
Scorecard

Canada; 98/4 (20 overs)	v	Brazil; 45 (16 overs)
Amarpal Kaur 30* (39); Laura Cardoso 2/16 (3 overs)		Roberta Moretti Avery 14 (36); Mannat Hundal 3/14 (4 overs)

Canada won by 53 runs
Woodley Cricket Field, Los Angeles
Umpires: Emmerson Carrington (Ber) and Vijaya Mallela (USA)
Player of the match: Mannat Hundal (Can)

- Canada won the toss and elected to bat.
- Mannat Hundal, Amarpal Kaur, Danielle McGahey, Rhea Mishra and Vijayani Vithanage (Can) all made their T20I debuts.
- Mannat Hundal became the first player for Canada to take a hat-trick in women's T20Is.

5 September 2023
09:30
Scorecard

United States; 106/6 (20 overs)	v	Brazil; 67 (18.5 overs)
Sindhu Sriharsha 52* (42); Roberta Moretti Avery 2/16 (3 overs)		Roberta Moretti Avery 25 (46); Chetna Pagydyala 3/4 (2 overs)

United States won by 39 runs
Woodley Cricket Field, Los Angeles
Umpires: Emmerson Carrington (Ber) and Arnold Maddela (Can)
Player of the match: Sindhu Sriharsha (USA)

- Brazil won the toss and elected to field.

5 September 2023
14:00
Scorecard

Canada; 131/6 (20 overs)	v	Argentina; 45 (15.4 overs)
Divya Saxena 64 (52); Alison Stocks 2/20 (4 overs)		Veronica Vasquez 19 (30); Amarpal Kaur 4/1 (2.4 overs)

Canada won by 86 runs
Woodley Cricket Field, Los Angeles
Umpires: Vijaya Mallela (USA) and Billy Taylor (USA)
Player of the match: Divya Saxena (Can)

- Argentina won the toss and elected to field.
- Nicole Gallagher and Rabbjyot Rajput (Can) both made their T20I debuts.

7 September 2023
09:30
Scorecard

United States; 133/6 (20 overs)	v	Canada; 108/6 (20 overs)
Ritu Singh 37 (16); Amarpal Kaur 3/30 (4 overs)		Kainat Qazi 24 (22); Ritu Singh 1/6 (2 overs)

United States won by 25 runs
Woodley Cricket Field, Los Angeles
Umpires: Emmerson Carrington (Ber) and Billy Taylor (USA)
Player of the match: Ritu Singh (USA)

- Canada won the toss and elected to field.

7 September 2023
14:00
Scorecard

Brazil; 105/5 (20 overs)	v	Argentina; 27 (12.3 overs)
Roberta Moretti Avery 47 (58); Alison Prince 1/14 (3 overs)		Alison Prince 8* (14); Lindsay Vilas Boas 3/6 (2 overs)

Brazil won by 78 runs
Woodley Cricket Field, Los Angeles
Umpires: Arnold Maddela (Can) and Vijaya Mallela (USA)
Player of the match: Roberta Moretti Avery (Bra)

- Argentina won the toss and elected to field.

8 September 2023
09:30
Scorecard

Canada; 122/9 (20 overs)	v	Brazil; 62 (15.2 overs)
Danielle McGahey 48 (45); Nicole Monteiro 2/26 (4 overs)		Laura Cardoso 20 (24); Amarpal Kaur 4/4 (3 overs)

Canada won by 60 runs
Woodley Cricket Field, Los Angeles
Umpires: Arnold Maddela (Can) and Billy Taylor (USA)
Player of the match: Amarpal Kaur (Can)

- Brazil won the toss and elected to field.

8 September 2023
14:00
Scorecard

United States; 132/7 (20 overs)	v	Argentina; 60 (18.4 overs)
Anika Kolan 48 (60); Albertina Galan 2/19 (4 overs)		Maria Castiñeiras 18 (18); Geetika Kodali 2/3 (2 overs)

United States won by 72 runs
Woodley Cricket Field, Los Angeles
Umpires: Emmerson Carrington (Ber) and Vijaya Mallela (USA)
Player of the match: Anika Kolan (USA)

- Argentina won the toss and elected to field.
- Jivana Aras (USA) made her T20I debut.

10 September 2023
09:30
Scorecard

Canada; 113 (20 overs)	v	Argentina; 76 (19.4 overs)
Divya Saxena 34 (33); Alison Stocks 4/24 (4 overs)		Maria Castiñeiras 22 (29); Amarpal Kaur 3/10 (4 overs)

Canada won by 37 runs
Woodley Cricket Field, Los Angeles
Umpires: Emmerson Carrington (Ber) and Arnold Maddela (Can)
Player of the match: Divya Saxena (Can)

- Canada won the toss and elected to bat.

10 September 2023
14:00
Scorecard

Brazil; 42 (19 overs)	v	United States; 43/0 (8 overs)
Carolina Nascimento 18 (26); Ritu Singh 4/3 (3 overs)		Gargi Bhogle 26* (28)

United States won by 10 wickets
Woodley Cricket Field, Los Angeles
Umpires: Vijaya Mallela (USA) and Billy Taylor (USA)
Player of the match: Ritu Singh (USA)

- Brazil won the toss and elected to bat.

11 September 2023
09:30
Scorecard

Argentina; 61/8 (20 overs)	v	Brazil; 64/1 (15.4 overs)
Mariana Martinez 21 (32); Carolina Nascimento 2/6 (4 overs)		Laura Agatha 28* (54); Constanza Sosa 1/12 (2 overs)

Brazil won by 9 wickets
Woodley Cricket Field, Los Angeles
Umpires: Emmerson Carrington (Ber) and Billy Taylor (USA)
Player of the match: Roberta Moretti Avery (Bra)

- Brazil won the toss and elected to field.

11 September 2023
14:00
Scorecard

United States; 128/5 (20 overs)	v	Canada; 98/7 (20 overs)
Disha Dhingra 58 (50); Divya Saxena 2/16 (2 overs)		Rhea Misra 31 (37); Isani Vaghela 4/16 (4 overs)

United States won by 30 runs
Woodley Cricket Field, Los Angeles
Umpires: Arnold Maddela (Can) and Vijaya Mallela (USA)
Player of the match: Disha Dhingra (USA)

- Canada won the toss and elected to field.
