= Kate Coppack =

English cricketer (born 1994)

Personal information
- Full name: Kate Louise Coppack
- Born: 30 August 1994 (age 32); Chester, Cheshire, England
- Batting: Right-handed
- Bowling: Right-arm medium
- Role: All-rounder

Domestic team information
- Years: Team
- 2009–2018: Cheshire
- 2019–2024: Middlesex
- 2019: → Berkshire (on loan)
- 2021–2024: Sunrisers
- 2023–2024: Welsh Fire
- 2024–2026: Essex
- 2025–present: London Spirit
- 2026–present: Surrey

Career statistics
Competition	WLA	WT20
Matches	80	78
Runs scored	545	618
Batting average	13.97	16.26
100s/50s	0/1	0/1
Top score	56	51
Balls bowled	2,834	1,292
Wickets	88	60
Bowling average	23.36	17.68
5 wickets in innings	1	0
10 wickets in match	0	0
Best bowling	6/28	3/11
Catches/stumpings	15/–	12/–
- Source: CricketArchive, 19 October 2024

Kate Louise Coppack (born 30 August 1994) is a Welsh cricketer who currently plays for Essex and London Spirit. An all-rounder, she is a right-handed batter and right-arm medium bowler. She has previously played for Cheshire, Berkshire and Sunrisers.

== Early life ==
Coppack was born on 30 August 1994 in Chester, Cheshire. She grew up in Hawarden, Wales, and went to school at King's School, Chester, where she became the first female to play cricket for the school's first team.

== Domestic career ==
Coppack made her county debut in 2009, for Cheshire against Essex. In 2010, she was her side's joint-leading wicket-taker in the Twenty20 Cup, with 4 wickets at an average of 20.50. The following season, she took 13 wickets in the 2011 Women's County Championship, including her maiden five-wicket haul, taking 6/28 against Somerset. In 2012, Coppack again had a strong season in the County Championship, with 10 wickets at an average of just 6.50.

In 2015, Coppack made her maiden county half-century, scoring 56 in a six-wicket win over Suffolk. From 2017, Cheshire only competed in the Women's Twenty20 Cup, withdrawing from the Women's County Championship. Coppack remained one of the side's leading players, taking 10 wickets at an average of 8.20 in the 2017 tournament, and hitting her maiden T20 half-century in the 2018 tournament, as well as taking 7 wickets.

In August 2018, Coppack played for Peru in the 2018 South American Women's Cricket Championship as a 'guest player'. She played all six matches for the side, scoring two half-centuries and taking 3/1 from 1 over against Brazil and 4/8 from 3.4 overs against Chile.

In 2019, Coppack moved to Middlesex, but spent the season on loan to Berkshire. She took 7 wickets for the side across the two competitions that season. In 2021, Coppack played for Middlesex in the Twenty20 Cup, taking 1 wicket. In 2022, she was the side's joint-leading wicket-taker in the Twenty20 Cup, with 7 wickets at an average of 9.85. She was the side's leading wicket-taker in the 2023 Women's Twenty20 Cup, with 8 wickets at an average of 6.75.

In 2021, Coppack was selected in the Sunrisers squad for their upcoming season. She made her debut for the side on 5 June, against Northern Diamonds in the Rachael Heyhoe Flint Trophy. She went on to play five matches in the tournament, taking three wickets. She also played three matches in the Charlotte Edwards Cup, taking two wickets at an average of 17.00. In 2022, she played six matches for the side, all in the Rachael Heyhoe Flint Trophy, taking six wickets at an average of 31.50. In a match against Southern Vipers, Coppack bowled a "relentlessly accurate" opening spell to help reduce to opposition to 38/5, ending the match with bowling figures of 4/48.

In 2023, she played 17 matches for Sunrisers, across the Rachael Heyhoe Flint Trophy and the Charlotte Edwards Cup, taking 15 wickets. She was also signed by Welsh Fire for The Hundred, but did not play a match.

Coppack took 4/27 off 10 overs as Sunrisers defeated South East Stars to win the 2024 Rachael Heyhoe Flint Trophy final on 21 September 2024. Overall in 2024, she played 20 matches for Sunrisers, across the Rachael Heyhoe Flint Trophy and the Charlotte Edwards Cup, taking 20 wickets.

On 8 January she joined Essex ahead of the 2025 season.

On 14 July she agreed a deal to join Surrey for the 2027 season. On 25 August Coppack joined Surrey on loan for the remainder of the 2026 One Day Cup season.
