= List of Argentina women Twenty20 International cricketers =

This is a list of Argentinian women Twenty20 International cricketers. In April 2018, the ICC decided to grant full Twenty20 International (T20I) status to all its members. Therefore, all Twenty20 matches played between Argentina Women and other ICC members after 1 July 2018 have the full T20I status.

This list comprises all members of the Argentina women's cricket team who have played at least one T20I match. It is initially arranged in the order in which each player won her first Twenty20 cap. Where more than one player won her first Twenty20 cap in the same match, those players are listed alphabetically by surname. Argentina Women played their first T20I matches during the 2019 South American Cricket Championship in October 2019.

== Key ==
General

- ‡ – Captain
- † – Wicket-keeper
- First – Year of debut
- Last – Year of latest game
- Mat – Number of matches played

Batting

- Runs – Runs scored in career
- HS – Highest score
- Avg – Runs scored per dismissal
- 50 – Number of half centuries
- 100 – Centuries scored
- * – Batsman remained not out

Bowling

- Balls – Balls bowled in career
- Wkt – Wickets taken in career
- BBI – Best bowling in an innings
- Ave – Average runs per wicket

Fielding

- Ca – Catches taken
- St – Stumpings affected

== List of players ==
Statistics are correct as of 25 October 2026.

Argentina Women T20I cricketers
General					Batting					Bowling				Fielding		Ref
No.	Name	First	Last	Mat	Runs	HS	Avg	50	100	Balls	Wkt	BBI	Ave	Ca	St	Ref
1	Maria Castiñeiras	2019	2026	48	857	155*	23.16	2	2	6	0	–	–	15	0	
2	Carla Comaschi	2019	2019	3	1	1	1.00	0	0	12	1	1/13	13.00	2	0	
3	Agustina Cullen	2019	2019	4	0	0	0.00	0	0	18	2	2/4	2.00	0	0	
4	Priscilla Gauna	2019	2019	2	14	14*	–	–	–	–	–	–	–	0	0	
5	Malena Lollo†	2019	2026	36	227	53*	9.45	1	0	138	7	4/6	13.71	11	4	
6	Constanza Sosa	2019	2026	39	83	16*	6.38	0	0	625	33	3/4	15.03	4	0	
7	Alison Stocks‡	2019	2025	38	331	48	13.24	0	0	704	41	7/3	13.24	4	0	
8	Lucia Taylor	2019	2025	38	496	169	15.03	1	1	624	21	3/11	24.61	10	0	
9	Martina Del Valle†	2019	2022	8	64	53	12.80	1	0	–	–	–	–	0	1	
10	Veronica Vasquez‡	2019	2026	30	462	107*	20.08	1	1	–	–	–	–	3	0	
11	Catalina Vecchi	2019	2019	5	16	12	4.00	0	0	42	1	1/21	36.00	2	0	
12	Julieta Cullen	2019	2026	33	310	58	14.76	2	0	108	3	1/1	31.33	3	0	
13	Mariana Martinez	2019	2025	36	241	31	8.31	0	0	656	26	2/10	23.88	3	0	
14	Tamara Basile	2021	2026	24	35	13	2.91	0	0	179	7	2/0	35.60	2	0	
15	Magdalena Esquivel	2021	2021	5	6	4	1.20	0	0	–	–	–	–	1	0	
16	Catalina Greloni	2021	2023	12	21	9	3.00	0	0	22	0	–	–	0	0	
17	Lucia Iglesias	2021	2021	2	0	0*	–	–	–	–	–	–	–	0	0	
18	Sofia Bruno	2021	2023	3	2	2*	–	0	0	6	0	–	–	0	0	
19	Albertina Galan	2021	2026	36	427	145*	13.77	0	1	561	31	3/0	13.45	12	0	
20	Alison Prince	2022	2024	22	92	42	7.66	0	0	142	4	1/1	31.75	1	0	
21	Naara Patron Fuentes†	2022	2025	18	27	6*	2.70	0	0	–	–	–	–	1	0	
22	Alina Emch	2023	2026	14	53	19*	10.60	0	0	105	8	3/16	11.50	4	0	
23	Francesca Galan	2023	2026	10	18	9	9.00	0	0	108	11	5/5	8.27	0	0	
24	Martina Quinn	2023	2024	4	1	1*	1.00	0	0	6	0	–	–	0	0	
25	Milagros Bestani	2025	2026	14	145	34	18.12	0	0	–	–	–	–	5	1	
26	Maria Lehmann	2025	2026	16	134	51*	13.40	1	0	72	6	3/1	8.50	2	0	
27	Julia Andujar	2026	2026	9	65	31*	13.00	0	0	84	4	1/11	20.50	4	0	
28	Anna Dei Castelli	2026	2026	7	11	6	5.50	0	0	88	5	2/10	12.00	5	0	
29	Clara Valencia	2026	2026	8	18	17*	18.00	0	0	88	7	3/15	13.57	2	0	
30	Maria Mastrangelo	2026	2026	4	7	5	3.50	0	0	45	3	1/0	5.66	1	0	
