= List of Peru women Twenty20 International cricketers =

This is a list of Peruvian women Twenty20 International cricketers. In April 2018, the ICC decided to grant full Twenty20 International (T20I) status to all its members. Therefore, all Twenty20 matches played between Peru Women and other ICC members after 1 July 2018 have the full T20I status.

This list comprises all members of the Peru women's cricket team who have played at least one T20I match. It is initially arranged in the order in which each player won his first Twenty20 cap. Where more than one player won his first Twenty20 cap in the same match, those players are listed alphabetically by surname. Peru Women played their first T20I matches during the 2019 South American Cricket Championship in October 2019.

== Key ==
General

- ‡ – Captain
- † – Wicket-keeper
- First – Year of debut
- Last – Year of latest game
- Mat – Number of matches played

Batting

- Runs – Runs scored in career
- HS – Highest score
- Avg – Runs scored per dismissal
- 50 – Number of half centuries
- * – Batsman remained not out

Bowling

- Balls – Balls bowled in career
- Wkt – Wickets taken in career
- BBI – Best bowling in an innings
- Ave – Average runs per wicket

Fielding

- Ca – Catches taken
- St – Stumpings affected

== List of players ==
Statistics are correct as of 16 October 2022.

Peru Women T20I cricketers
General					Batting				Bowling				Fielding		Ref
No.	Name	First	Last	Mat	Runs	HS	Avg	50	Balls	Wkt	BBI	Ave	Ca	St	Ref
1	Adriana Vasquez	2019	2019	3	8	5*	4.00	0	–	–	–	–	0	0	
2	Alexandra Vasquez	2019	2019	4	7	5	1.75	0	–	–	–	–	0	0	
3	Evelyn Armas†	2019	2022	7	14	10*	3.50	0	72	1	1/32	129.00	0	0	
4	Maria Cabrera	2019	2019	4	0	0	0.00	0	18	0	–	–	0	0	
5	Stacy Diaz	2019	2022	5	0	0	0.00	0	48	0	–	–	0	0	
6	Olivia Espinoza	2019	2022	7	1	1	0.33	0	24	0	–	–	0	0	
7	Samantha Hickman	2019	2022	7	113	53	56.50	1	132	9	3/23	15.55	1	0	
8	Milka Linares‡	2019	2022	7	34	15*	8.50	0	110	3	2/35	65.66	1	0	
9	Angiella Rutti	2019	2022	7	1	1	0.25	0	120	2	1/16	107.00	0	0	
10	Maria Vera	2019	2022	4	1	1	1.00	0	–	–	–	–	0	0	
11	Kyara Villanella†	2019	2019	4	0	0	0	0	–	–	–	–	0	0	
12	Michelle Horna	2019	2019	3	1	1*	–	0	6	0	–	–	0	0	
13	Julissa Li	2019	2022	2	–	–	–	–	–	–	–	–	0	0	
14	Maria Rodriguez	2019	2019	1	7	7	7.00	0	–	–	–	–	0	0	
15	Erika Bustamente Saavedra	2022	2022	3	1	1	0.33	0	–	–	–	–	0	0	
16	Erica Del Rosario	2022	2022	1	1	1*	–	0	24	1	1/50	50.00	0	0	
17	Pierina Kelzy de Ortiz	2022	2022	3	5	5	2.50	0	18	0	–	–	0	0	
18	Milka Linares Flores‡	2022	2022	3	1	1	0.50	0	24	0	–	–	0	0	
19	Sisi Varillas Atencio	2022	2022	2	0	0	0.00	0	–	–	–	–	0	0	
