= Veronica Vasquez =

Argentine cricketer

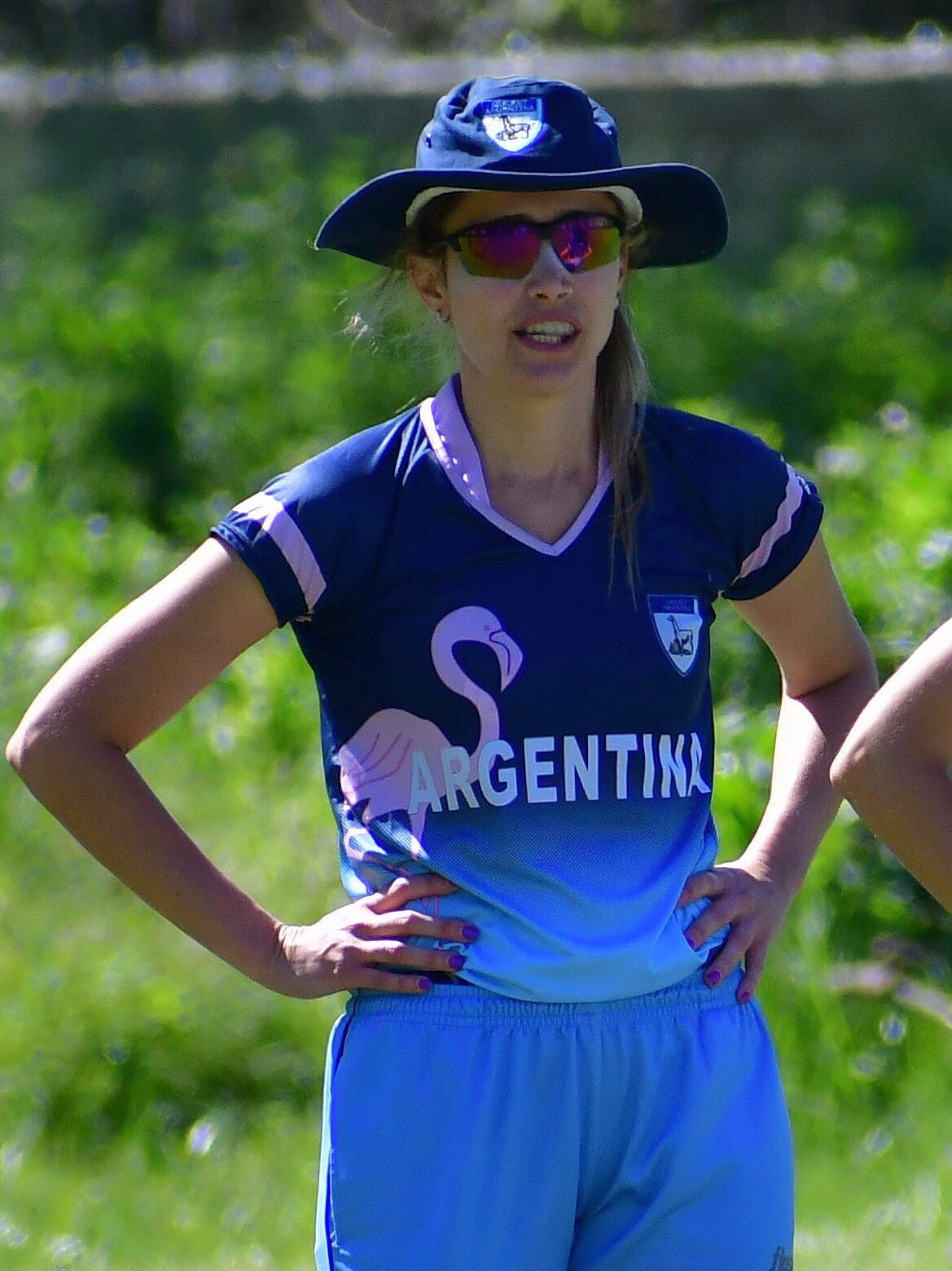

Personal information
- Born: 18 October 1995 (age 31)
- Batting: Right-handed
- Bowling: Right-arm medium

International information
- National side: Argentina
- T20I debut (cap 10): 3 October 2019 v Peru
- Last T20I: 15 October 2023 v Chile

Career statistics
Competition	WT20I
Matches	28
Runs scored	448
Batting average	20.36
100s/50s	1/1
Top score	107*
Balls bowled	–
Wickets	–
Bowling average	–
5 wickets in innings	–
10 wickets in match	–
Best bowling	–
Catches/stumpings	2/–
- Source: Cricinfo, 30 April 2024

Veronica Vasquez (born 18 October 1995) is an Argentine doctor working as an anesthesiologist, and the captain of the Argentina women's national cricket team. During the COVID-19 pandemic in Argentina, Vasquez was working in the Fiorito Hospital in Buenos Aires.

Vasquez made her Women's Twenty20 International (WT20I) debut on 3 October 2019, for Argentina against Peru in the 2019 South American Cricket Championship. Vasquez captained Argentina in all five matches they played in the tournament. In October 2021, Vasquez was named as the captain of Argentina's side for the 2021 ICC Women's T20 World Cup Americas Qualifier tournament in Mexico.
