= Laura Cardoso (cricketer) =

Brazilian cricketer (born 2005)

Personal information
- Full name: Laura Cardoso Vilas Boas
- Born: 28 March 2005 (age 21); Brazil
- Batting: Right-handed
- Bowling: Right-arm medium fast
- Role: Bowling allrounder

International information
- National side: Brazil
- T20I debut (cap 15): 19 October 2021 v Argentina
- Last T20I: 9 April 2026 v Lesotho

Career statistics
Competition	T20I
Matches	48
Runs scored	656
Batting average	20.50
100s/50s	0/3
Top score	71*
Balls bowled	753
Wickets	55
Bowling average	9.76
5 wickets in innings	1
10 wickets in match	0
Best bowling	9/4
Catches/stumpings	19/–
- Source: ESPNcricinfo, 9 April 2026

Laura Cardoso Vilas Boas (born 28 March 2005) is a Brazilian cricketer who plays for the women's national cricket team as a right-arm medium fast bowler and right handed batter. In 2021, aged 16, she became the first cricketer, male or female, to take a hat-trick for Brazil in a Twenty20 International (T20I). On 9 April 2026, during the 2026 Kalahari Women's Tournament in Botswana, she set a record for the best bowling figures in a T20I when she took 9/4 against Lesotho.

== Early life ==
Cardoso has been involved in sport since she was very young. Initially, she played volleyball. At the age of 11, she switched to cricket, and joined a community cricket project called Criança Feliz (transl. happy child). By the time she was 12, she was displaying exceptional talent for the game.

== International career ==
In January 2020, Cardoso was one of the first 14 cricketers, all of them female, to be centrally contracted by Cricket Brasil. Determined not to let the opportunity slip, she became even more disciplined in her approach to the balancing of cricket's demanding schedule with her school commitments.

Even before making her international debut, she was being described as the national team's "premier allrounder", like her idol Ellyse Perry.

In October 2021, Cardoso was selected in Brazil's squad for the ICC Women's T20 World Cup Americas Qualifier, to be held in Naucalpan, Mexico. Ahead of the tournament, her captain, Roberta Moretti Avery, was lauding her as "a gun". Cardoso made her WT20I debut in the first match of the tournament, against the United States, on 18 October 2021. She took one wicket for six runs in two overs. Three days later, in Brazil's second match against the United States, she took 3/24.

On 25 October 2021, in Brazil's final match of the tournament, against Canada, Cardoso's performance was even more impressive. With Canada poised at 46/5 and needing just three runs in the final over for victory, Moretti handed Cardoso the ball. After beginning the over with a dot delivery, Cardoso watched Canada lose its sixth wicket to a run out off her second ball. She then proceeded to take a hat trick with her third, fourth and fifth deliveries.

Cardoso thus became the first cricketer, male or female, to take a hat-trick for Brazil in a T20I. Brazil then won the match, by taking Canada's final wicket with a run out off the final ball of the innings, to end what has been dubbed the most dramatic over in Brazilian cricket history. Cardoso finished the match with 3/8 and the player of the match award. She also completed the tournament with a total of 11 wickets, the most of any of the bowlers, from her six matches.

In May 2022, Cardoso and Moretti were recruited to play in the privately run 2022 FairBreak Invitational T20 in Dubai, United Arab Emirates. They were both allocated to the Barmy Army team.

On 9 April 2026, during the 2026 Kalahari Women's Tournament in Botswana, she set a record for the best bowling figures in a T20I when she took 9/4 against Lesotho. The first five wickets came from consecutive deliveries.

== See also ==
- List of Brazil women Twenty20 International cricketers
