= List of Brazil women Twenty20 International cricketers =

This is a list of Brazilian women Twenty20 International cricketers. A Twenty20 International is an international cricket match between two representative teams, each having Twenty20 International status, as determined by the International Cricket Council (ICC). A Twenty20 International is played under the rules of Twenty20 cricket.

This list includes all players who have played at least one T20I match for Brazil and is initially arranged in the order of debut appearance. Where more than one player won their first cap in the same match, their names are initially listed alphabetically at the time of debut.

== Key ==
General

- ‡ – Captain
- † – Wicket-keeper
- First – Year of debut
- Last – Year of latest game
- Mat – Number of matches played

Batting

- Runs – Runs scored in career
- HS – Highest score
- 50 – Half-centuries scored
- 100 – Centuries scored
- Avg – Runs scored per dismissal
- * – Batswoman remained not out

Bowling

- Wkt – Wickets taken in career
- BBI – Best bowling in an innings
- Ave – Average runs per wicket

Fielding

- Ca – Catches taken
- St – Stumpings affected

== List of players ==
Statistics are correct as of 30 July 2026.

Brazil women T20I cricketers
General					Batting					Bowling				Fielding		Ref
No.	Name	First	Last	Mat	Runs	HS	Avg	50	100	Balls	Wkt	BBI	Ave	Ca	St	Ref
1	Laura Agatha	2018	2026	70	1087	144*	20.50	6	1	55	6	2/3	2.83	12	0	
2	Roberta Moretti Avery‡	2018	2026	70	1,353	77*	37.58	6	0	338	33	3/1	8.06	29	0	
3	Lindsay Vilas Boas†	2018	2026	69	1152	121	19.86	2	1	706	39	5/10	16.33	28	0	
4	Elisa Carvalho	2018	2019	4	8	6	2.66	0	0	–	–	–	–	1	0	
5	Renata de Sousa	2018	2023	36	440	55	17.60	1	0	747	33	4/12	12.33	10	0	
6	Julia Faustino	2018	2019	9	13	8*	6.50	0	0	108	6	2/12	6.83	0	0	
7	Nicole Monteiro	2018	2026	70	144	17	6.85	0	0	1,170	84	5/7	10.08	10	0	
8	Alice Nascimento	2018	2021	12	7	3*	2.33	0	0	16	1	1/5	8.00	4	0	
9	Erika Ribeiro	2018	2021	6	22	15	5.50	0	0	17	4	2/0	0.75	3	0	
10	Narayana Ribeiro‡	2018	2018	4	155	53*	51.66	1	0	24	2	1/1	5.00	2	0	
11	Gabriella Silva	2018	2019	8	45	23*	11.25	0	0	12	0	–	–	1	0	
12	Denise de Souza	2018	2019	10	39	26	19.50	0	0	138	13	4/8	7.07	7	2	
13	Ana Vicentin	2018	2018	4	70	44	17.00	0	0	36	2	1/2	7.50	2	0	
14	Duda Costa†	2018	2018	2	–	–	–	–	–	–	–	–	–	2	0	
15	Elisa Batista	2019	2019	1	–	–	–	–	–	–	–	–	–	0	0	
16	Lara Moisés	2019	2026	54	82	16	8.20	0	0	979	53	3/6	13.22	5	0	
17	Maria Costa†	2019	2019	3	–	–	–	–	–	–	–	–	–	3	0	
18	Rayana Oliveira	2019	2019	3	–	–	–	–	–	12	1	1/8	8.00	1	0	
19	Marianne Artur	2021	2026	43	110	34	5.50	0	0	292	16	2/3	15.87	8	0	
20	Laura Cardoso‡	2021	2026	62	830	71*	19.30	3	0	981	66	9/4	11.54	23	0	
21	Evelyn de Souza†	2021	2022	14	70	35	6.36	0	0	–	–	–	–	6	4	
22	Maria Ribeiro	2021	2026	61	23	4	2.09	0	0	1075	71	5/14	12.05	10	0	
23	Daniella Staddon	2021	2022	12	65	29	7.22	0	0	36	2	1/2	11.50	0	0	
24	Carolina Nascimento‡	2022	2026	50	142	30	6.76	0	0	748	43	5/12	14.48	22	0	
25	Maria Silva	2022	2026	46	206	51	8.58	1	0	29	2	2/1	15.00	12	0	
26	Monnike Machado†	2022	2026	38	302	69*	20.13	2	0	–	–	–	–	17	9	
27	Laira Ribeiro Bento	2022	2023	5	–	–	–	–	–	66	3	2/9	13.66	1	0	
28	Ana Sabino	2023	2026	35	248	43	12.40	0	0	6	0	–	–	6	0	
29	Camile Fernandes Torres	2023	2025	2	1	1	1.00	0	0	12	1	1/10	10.00	0	0	
30	Mayara dos Santos†	2023	2026	18	4	4	2.00	0	0	–	–	–	–	3	3	
31	Evelyn Müller	2023	2026	21	65	17	5.90	0	0	–	–	–	–	1	0	
32	Winnie Pereira Alves	2023	2023	1	–	–	–	–	–	–	–	–	–	0	0	
33	Giulia Ribeiro	2025	2025	4	–	–	–	–	–	18	1	1/3	19.00	1	0	
