= List of Mexico women Twenty20 International cricketers =

This is a list of Mexican women Twenty20 International cricketers. A Twenty20 International is an international cricket match between two representative teams, each having Twenty20 International status, as determined by the International Cricket Council (ICC). A Twenty20 International is played under the rules of Twenty20 cricket.

This list includes the names of all players who have played at least one T20I match for Mexico Women and is initially arranged in the order of debut appearance. Where more than one player won their first cap in the same match, those players are initially listed alphabetically at the time of debut.

== Key ==
General

- ‡ – Captain
- † – Wicket-keeper
- First – Year of debut
- Last – Year of latest game
- Mat – Number of matches played

Batting

- Runs – Runs scored in career
- HS – Highest score
- Avg – Runs scored per dismissal
- * – Batsman remained not out
- 50 – Number of half centuries

Bowling

- Wkt – Wickets taken in career
- BBI – Best bowling in an innings
- Ave – Average runs per wicket

Fielding

- Ca – Catches taken
- St – Stumpings affected

== List of players ==
Statistics are correct as of 25 October 2026.

Mexico women T20I cricketers
General					Batting				Bowling				Fielding		Ref
No.	Name	First	Last	Mat	Runs	HS	Avg	50	Balls	Wkt	BBI	Ave	Ca	St	Ref
1	Anyel Aguilar	2018	2019	8	9	6	1.80	0	–	–	–	–	2	0	
2	Aileen Fernandez	2018	2019	9	9	7	1.80	0	166	5	2/17	51.00	0	0	
3	Erika Fernandez	2018	2019	10	27	17*	3.85	0	157	5	2/16	43.60	0	0	
4	Iris Hernandez	2018	2018	3	2	2*	–	0	–	–	–	–	0	0	
5	Anjuli Ladron	2018	2019	6	57	22	11.40	0	84	7	2/12	9.57	3	0	
6	Ana Montenegro†	2018	2019	10	155	51	19.73	1	–	–	–	–	2	1	
7	Caroline Owen‡	2018	2019	10	160	52*	26.66	1	191	10	3/17	18.20	2	0	
8	Maria Pacheco	2018	2019	10	15	6	2.14	0	113	6	3/17	14.50	5	0	
9	Tania Salcedo‡	2018	2026	20	113	23	6.27	0	401	24	4/15	16.70	3	0	
10	Anna Septien‡	2018	2026	14	80	30	6.15	0	282	9	2/8	38.11	5	0	
11	Aida Tovar	2018	2019	9	20	12	3.33	0	36	2	1/4	21.00	0	0	
12	Sara Hernandez	2018	2018	1	0	0	0.00	0	–	–	–	–	0	0	
13	Sara Lopez	2018	2018	1	0	0	0.00	0	–	–	–	–	0	0	
14	Magdalena De Gante	2019	2019	4	7	5	3.50	0	54	5	3/18	11.00	0	0	
15	Julieta Marquina	2019	2019	2	–	–	–	–	–	–	–	–	0	0	
16	Gabriella Morales	2019	2024	12	14	7	2.80	0	177	7	2/7	32.00	1	0	
17	Anatza Castrejon	2019	2019	4	28	20	9.33	0	–	–	–	–	0	0	
18	Ana Katsuda	2019	2019	3	2	2	2.00	0	6	0	–	–	0	0	
19	Dulce Garcia†	2024	2024	6	4	2	1.00	0	–	–	–	–	2	0	
20	Diana Hernandez	2024	2024	6	5	3*	1.25	0	18	0	–	–	0	0	
21	Judith Jimenez	2024	2024	5	30	17	7.50	0	48	1	1/21	83.00	3	0	
22	Dafne Mejia†	2024	2024	7	79	55	11.28	1	–	–	–	–	0	0	
23	Megan Mohedano	2024	2024	6	24	9	4.00	0	–	–	–	–	0	0	
24	Monica Mohedano	2024	2024	7	11	6	1.83	0	–	–	–	–	0	0	
25	Marlin Ortiz	2024	2024	7	70	41	10.00	0	144	5	2/7	29.00	0	0	
26	Ivonne Rodriguez	2024	2026	8	1	1	0.33	0	132	3	2/24	77.00	0	0	
27	Miriam Diaz	2024	2024	3	0	0*	0.00	0	–	–	–	–	1	0	
28	Esther Franco	2024	2024	1	–	–	–	–	–	–	–	–	0	0	
29	Salma Ruelas	2024	2024	2	6	6*	6.00	0	24	1	1/9	22.00	0	0	
30	Metztli Torres†	2024	2024	1	0	0*	–	0	–	–	–	–	1	0	
31	Coral Amado	2026	2026	3	0	0*	0.00	0	–	–	–	–	0	0	
32	Virginia Diaz	2026	2026	3	0	0	0.00	0	–	–	–	–	0	0	
33	Gabriela Gaby	2026	2026	3	8	6	2.66	0	72	5	3/35	22.40	0	0	
34	Zitlalli Hernandez	2026	2026	3	6	3	2.00	0	–	–	–	–	0	0	
35	Maddelyn Fernanda	2026	2026	2	0	0	0.00	0	–	–	–	–	0	0	
36	Maria del Carmen	2026	2026	2	1	1	0.50	0	–	–	–	–	0	0	
37	Jennifer Pastrana†	2026	2026	3	1	1	0.50	0	–	–	–	–	0	4	
38	Araceli Perez	2026	2026	3	0	0	0.00	0	72	3	2/46	55.00	0	0	
39	Judith Diaz	2026	2026	2	2	2*	2.00	0	–	–	–	–	1	0	
