= 2018 South American Women's Cricket Championship =

International cricket tournament

- Dates: 23 – 26 August 2018
- Administrator: ICC Americas
- Cricket format: WT20I, Women's 20-over game
- Tournament format(s): Double round-robin, Final
- Host: Colombia
- Champions: Brazil (3rd title)
- Runners-up: Chile
- Participants: 4
- Matches: 13
- Most runs: (Brazil) Narayana Reinehr (171)
- Most wickets: (Chile) Jessica Miranda (14)

The 2018 South American Women's Cricket Championship was held in Colombia from 23 to 26 August. The four teams that participated this year were the women's sides of Brazil, Chile, Mexico and Peru. This was the first time in the tournament's history that the matches were recognized as official WT20I games as the ICC granted WT20I status to all matches played between the associate teams from 1 July 2018. All participating teams made their WT20I debuts during the tournament (except for Peru who included some unqualified 'guest' players in their squad and hence their matches were not granted WT20I status). All matches were played on two fields of the Los Pinos Polo Club in Mosquera, near Bogotá. Brazil won the tournament by registering a comprehensive win over Chile in the final.

== Squads ==
Brazil	Chile	Mexico	Peru
Roberta Moretti Avery (c); Ana Vicentin (vc); Laura Agatha; Elisa Carvalho; Duda Costa; Renata de Sousa; Denise de Souza; Julia Faustino; Lindsay Mariano; Nikki Monteiro; Alice Nascimento; Erika Reinehr; Narayana Reinehr; Gabriella Silva	Jeannette Garces (c); Nicole Conejeros (vc); Yaritza Beltran; Marisol Cea; Janice Espinoza; Francisca Galvez; Juliette Guardia; Anais Millan; Jessica Miranda; Franchesca Moya; Tiara Pueye; Francisca Riquelme; Maria Saavedra; Ariel Tapia; Arlette Uribe	Caroline Owen (c); Ana Montenegro (vc); Anyel Aguilar; Rosela Espinosa; Aileen Fernandez; Erika Fernandez; Iris Hernandez; Sara Hernandez; Anjuli Ladron; Sara Lopez; Maria Pacheco; Tania Salcedo; Ana Septien; Aida Tovar; Laura Zapata	Samantha Hickman (c); Claribel Carabali; Kate Coppack; Denise Ho; Emily Kilner; Vivian McCarthy; Srividhya Panchabakesan; Serita Pickersgill; Jade Rodriguez; Silvana Uceda; Tricia Yarna

== Round-robin ==
=== Points table ===
Team	P	W	L	T	N/R	Pts	NRR	Status
Brazil	6	6	0	0	0	18	+5.942	Advanced to the Final
Chile	6	4	2	0	0	12	–1.370	Advanced to the Final
Peru	6	1	5	0	0	3	–1.700	Eliminated
Mexico^{1}	6	1	5	0	0	3	–2.268	Eliminated

^{1}CricHQ table incorrectly states that Mexico had 2 wins and 4 defeats; but the results indicate this should be 1 win and 5 defeats.

=== Matches ===
23 August 2018
08:30
Scorecard

Brazil; 123/7 (20 overs)	v	Mexico; 32 (12 overs)
Narayana Ribeiro 29 (51); Caroline Owen 3/17 (4 overs)		Caroline Owen 8 (23); Nikki Monteiro 2/3 (2 overs); Laura Agatha 2/3 (2 overs)

Brazil won by 91 runs
Los Pinos Polo Club Ground field 1, Cundinamarca

- Brazil won the toss and elected to bat.
- Lindsay Mariano, Roberta Moretti Avery, Elisa Carvalho, Renata de Sousa, Denise de Souza, Julia Faustino, Lindsay Mariano, Nikki Monteiro, Erika Ribeiro, Narayana Ribeiro, Ana Vicentin (Bra), Anyel Aguilar, Aileen Fernandez, Erika Fernandez, Iris Hernandez, Anjuli Ladron, Ana Montenegro, Caroline Owen, Maria Pacheco, Tania Salcedo, Anna Septien and Aida Tovar (Mex) all made their WT20I debuts.

23 August 2018
08:30
Scorecard

Chile; 159/3 (20 overs)	v	Peru; 82/8 (20 overs)
Nicole Conejeros 83 (?); Kate Coppack 1/14 (3 overs)		? Jessica Miranda 2/18 (4 overs)

Chile won by 77 runs (Note: Confirmed by Chile Women's Cricket (Las Loicas) on Twitter.) (scorecard incomplete)
Los Pinos Polo Club Ground field 2, Cundinamarca

- Chile won the toss and elected to bat.

23 August 2018
13:00
Scorecard

Peru; 110/6 (20 overs)	v	Mexico; 110/8 (20 overs)
Kate Coppack 70* (?); Caroline Owen 3/12 (4 overs)		? ?

Match tied (Peru Women won the Super Over) (Note: Confirmed on Mexico Cricket Association's website.) (scorecard incomplete)
Los Pinos Polo Club Ground field 1, Cundinamarca

- Peru won the toss and elected to bat.

23 August 2018
13:00
Scorecard

Brazil; 153/2 (20 overs)	v	Chile; 42 (17 overs)
Narayana Ribeiro 53* (56); Arlette Uribe 1/35 (4 overs)		Yaritza Rodriguez 6 (18); Denise Souza 4/8 (3 overs)

Brazil won by 111 runs
Los Pinos Polo Club Ground field 2, Cundinamarca

- Chile won the toss and elected to field.
- Alice Nascimento, Gabriella Silva (Bra), Nicole Conejeros, Janice Espinoza, Francisca Galvez, Jeannette Gonzalez, Juliette Guardia, Jessica Miranda, Francisca Riquelme, Yaritza Rodriguez, Maria Saavedra, Ariel Tapia and Arlette Uribe (Chi) all made their WT20I debuts.

24 August 2018
08:30
Scorecard

Mexico; 104/7 (20 overs)	v	Chile; 105/6 (19.1 overs)
Caroline Owen 26 (28); Jessica Miranda 3/8 (4 overs)		Nicole Conejeros 30 (35); Caroline Owen 1/12 (4 overs)

Chile won by 4 wickets
Los Pinos Polo Club Ground field 1, Cundinamarca

- Chile won the toss and elected to field.
- Franchesca Moya (Chi) made her WT20I debut.

24 August 2018
08:30
Scorecard

Peru; 32/6 (20 overs)	v	Brazil; 33/3 (5.5 overs)
Samantha Hickman 9 (37); Renata Sousa 2/2 (3 overs)		Lindsay Mariano 12 (16); Kate Coppack 3/1 (1 over)

Brazil won by 7 wickets
Los Pinos Polo Club Ground field 2, Cundinamarca

- Peru won the toss and elected to bat.

24 August 2018
13:00
Scorecard

Brazil; 168/4 (20 overs)	v	Mexico; 18 (9.5 overs)
Renata Sousa 55 (60); Anjuli Ladron 1/17 (2 overs)		Anjuli Ladron 12 (10); Erika Ribeiro 2/0 (0.5 overs)

Brazil won by 150 runs
Los Pinos Polo Club Ground field 1, Cundinamarca

- Brazil won the toss and elected to bat.
- Sara Hernandez (Mex) made her T20I debut.
- The eighteen runs scored by Mexico Women was the lowest team total in a completed WT20I match.

24 August 2018
13:00
Scorecard

Peru; 98/7 (20 overs)	v	Chile; 98 (18.4 overs)
Kate Coppack 51 (57); Nicole Conejeros 3/27 (4 overs)		Nicole Conejeros 34 (32); Kate Coppack 4/8 (3.4 overs)

Match tied (Chile won the Super Over) (Note: Confirmed by Chile Women's Cricket (Las Loicas) on Twitter.)
Los Pinos Polo Club Ground field 2, Cundinamarca

- Chile won the toss and elected to field.

25 August 2018
13:00
Scorecard

Peru; 106/3 (20 overs)	v	Mexico; 107/6 (20 overs)
Kate Coppack 36* (?); Tania Salcedo 1/10 (4 overs)		Anjuli Ladron 25 (?); Jade Rodriguez 3/8 (4 overs)

Mexico won by 4 wickets (Note: Confirmed on Mexico Cricket Association's website.) (scorecard incomplete)
Los Pinos Polo Club Ground field 1, Cundinamarca

- Mexico won the toss and elected to field.

25 August 2018
13:00
Scorecard

Brazil; 128/5 (20 overs)	v	Chile; 37 (15.4 overs)
Ana Vicentin 44 (47); Jessica Miranda 1/25 (4 overs)		Tiara Pueye 6 (10); Roberta Moretti Avery 3/1 (2 overs)

Brazil won by 91 runs
Los Pinos Polo Club Ground field 2, Cundinamarca

- Brazil won the toss and elected to bat.
- Duda Costa (Bra) and Tiara Pueye (Chi) both made their WT20I debuts.

26 August 2018
09:00
Scorecard

Mexico; 53 (12.4 overs)	v	Chile; 54/4 (9.2 overs)
Anjuli Ladron 10 (6); Jessica Miranda 4/11 (2.4 overs)		Yaritza Rodriguez 14 (24); Ana Septien 2/8 (2 overs)

Chile won by 6 wickets
Los Pinos Polo Club Ground field 1, Cundinamarca

- Chile won the toss and elected to field.
- Marisol Cea (Chi) and Sara Lopez (Mex) both made their WT20I debuts.

26 August 2018
09:00
Scorecard

Brazil; 195/1 (20 overs)	v	Peru; 33 (16.4 overs)
Erika Ribeiro 94* (80); Kate Coppack 1/35 (4 overs)		Serita Pickersgill 6 (17); Denise Souza 4/11 (4 overs)

Brazil won by 162 runs
Los Pinos Polo Club Ground field 2, Cundinamarca

- Peru won the toss and elected to field.

== Final ==
26 August 2019
13:00
Scorecard

Brazil; 137/6 (20 overs)	v	Chile; 45 (15 overs)
Narayana Ribeiro 34 (31); Jessica Miranda 2/14 (4 overs)		Tiara Pueye 9 (10); Renata Sousa 3/5 (3 over)

Brazil won by 92 runs
Los Pinos Polo Club Ground field 2, Cundinamarca

- Brazil won the toss and elected to bat.

== See also ==
- 2018 South American Cricket Championship – Men's tournament
