= Brazil women's national cricket team =

Cricket team

Brazil
- Association: Brazilian Cricket Confederation

Personnel
- Captain: Carolina Nascimento
- Coach: Matthew Featherstone

International Cricket Council
- ICC status: Associate member (2017); Affiliate member (2002)
- ICC region: Americas
ICC Rankings	Current	Best-ever
T20I	35th	27th (2 Oct 2020)

International cricket
- First international: v Argentina at Clube de Campo Avelino A Vieira, Curitiba; 7 September 2007

T20 Internationals
- First T20I: v Mexico at Los Pinos Polo Club 1, Bogotá; 23 August 2018
- Last T20I: v Spain at Embrach Cricket Ground, Embrach; 30 July 2026
T20Is	Played	Won/Lost
Total	77	55/21 (1 tie, 0 no results)
This year	19	16/2 (1 tie, 0 no results)
T20I kit
- As of 30 July 2026

The Brazil women's national cricket team represents Brazil in international women's cricket matches. The team made its international debut in 2007, with Brazil having been a member of the International Cricket Council (ICC) since 2002. Brazil is one of the leading teams in the ICC Americas region, along with the United States and Canada, but is yet to qualify for any global tournaments.

== History ==
Brazil made its international debut against Argentina in 2007, hosting a three-match series in Curitiba.

In April 2018, the International Cricket Council (ICC) granted full Women's Twenty20 International (WT20I) status to all its members. Therefore, all Twenty20 matches played between Brazil women and another international side since 1 July 2018 have been full WT20I matches.

Brazil's first WT20I matches were contested as part of the South American Women's Championships in August 2018 against Chile, Mexico and Peru (although Peru's matches were not classified as WT20Is as not all of their players met the ICC residency requirements). Brazil won all group stage matches and defeated Chile by 92 runs in the final.

In January 2020, Cricket Brazil awarded central contracts to fourteen of its players.

In December 2020, the ICC announced the qualification pathway for the 2023 ICC Women's T20 World Cup. Brazil were named in the 2021 ICC Women's T20 World Cup Americas Qualifier regional group, alongside three other teams. In that qualifier, Brazil finished second, and also achieved a miraculous one-run win over Canada, by taking five wickets in the last five consecutive deliveries of the two teams' second T20I match against each other.

Brazil was invited to the 2022 Kwibuka Women's T20 Tournament in Rwanda, along with Germany, becoming one of the first two non-African teams to participate in the tournament. Brazil recorded wins over Germany and Botswana in the round-robin stage of the tournament, before losing to Nigeria in the fifth-place play-off.

== Tournament history ==
=== ICC Women's T20 World Cup Americas Qualifier ===
ICC Women's T20 World Cup Americas Qualifier records
Year	Round	Position	GP	W	L	T	NR
(United States) 2019	Did not participate						
(Mexico) 2021	Runners-up	2/4	6	4	2	0	0
(Canada) 2023	Round-robin	3/4	6	2	4	0	0
(Argentina) 2025	Round-robin	3/4	6	2	4	0	0
Total	3/4	0 Title	18	8	10	0	0

=== Women's World T20 ===
Twenty20 World Cup Record
Year	Round	Position	GP	W	L	T	NR
(England) 2009	Did not qualify						
(Cricket West Indies) 2010	Did not qualify						
(Sri Lanka) 2012	Did not qualify						
(Bangladesh) 2014	Did not qualify						
(India) 2016	Did not qualify						
(Cricket West Indies) 2018	Did not qualify						
(Australia) 2020	Did not qualify						
(South Africa) 2023	Did not qualify						
(United Arab Emirates) 2024	Did not qualify						
(England) 2026	Did not qualify						
Total	0/9	0 Titles	0	0	0	0	0

=== Women's World Cup ===
World Cup record
Year	Round	Position	GP	W	L	T	NR
(England) 1973	Did not qualify/No women's ODI status						
(India) 1978	Did not qualify/No women's ODI status						
(New Zealand) 1982	Did not qualify/No women's ODI status						
(Australia) 1988	Did not qualify/No women's ODI status						
(England) 1993	Did not qualify/No women's ODI status						
(India) 1997	Did not qualify/No women's ODI status						
(New Zealand) 2000	Did not qualify/No women's ODI status						
(South Africa) 2005	Did not qualify/No women's ODI status						
(Australia) 2009	Did not qualify/No women's ODI status						
(India) 2013	Did not qualify/No women's ODI status						
(England) 2017	Did not qualify/No women's ODI status						
(New Zealand) 2022	Did not qualify/No women's ODI status						
(India) 2025	To be determined						
Total	0/12	0 Titles	0	0	0	0	0

=== South American Cricket Championship ===
South American Women's Cricket Championship records
Year	Round	Position	GP	W	L	T	NR
(Brazil) 2007	The full information of the tournament have not found						
(Argentina) 2009	The full information of the tournament have not found						
(Chile) 2010	The full information of the tournament have not found						
(Brazil) 2011	The full information of the tournament have not found						
(Argentina) 2013	The full information of the tournament have not found						
(Peru) 2014	The full information of the tournament have not found						
(Chile) 2015	The full information of the tournament have not found						
(Brazil) 2016	The full information of the tournament have not found						
(Argentina) 2017	The full information of the tournament have not found						
(Colombia) 2018	Champions	1/4	7	7	0	0	0
(Peru) 2019	Champions	1/5	5	5	0	0	0
(Brazil) 2022	Runners-up	2/4	4	2	2	0	0
(Brazil) 2024	Champions	1/4	3	3	0	0	0
Total	13/13	–	19	17	2	0	0

=== Kwibuka Women's T20 Tournament ===
Kwibuka T20 Tournament records
Year	Round	Position	GP	W	L	T	NR
(Rwanda) 2014	Did not participate						
(Rwanda) 2015	Did not participate						
(Rwanda) 2016	Did not participate						
(Rwanda) 2017	Did not participate						
(Rwanda) 2018	Did not participate						
(Rwanda) 2019	Did not participate						
(Rwanda) 2021	Did not participate						
(Rwanda) 2022	Round-robin	6/8	7	2	5	0	0
(Rwanda) 2023	Did not participate						
(Rwanda) 2024	Did not participate						
(Rwanda) 2025	Round-robin	6/9	8	4	4	0	0
Total	2/11	0 Title	15	6	9	0	0

== Current squad ==
This lists all the players who were part of the 2023 ICC Women's T20 World Cup Americas Qualifier squad.

Name	Age	Batting style	Bowling style	Notes
Batters
Roberta Moretti Avery	41	Right-handed	Right-arm medium	Captain
Laura Agatha	26	Right-handed	Right-arm medium	
Marianne Artur	21	Left-handed	Left-arm medium	
Maria Silva	21	Right-handed	Right-arm medium	
Ana Sabino	21	Right-handed	Right-arm medium	
Evelyn Muller	19	Right-handed	Right-arm medium	
All-rounders
Lindsay Boas	25	Right-handed	Right-arm medium	
Laura Cardoso	21	Right-handed	Right-arm medium	
Renata de Sousa	28	Right-handed	Right-arm medium	
Wicketkeepers
Monnike Machado	22	Right-handed	-	
Mayara dos Santos	36	Right-handed	-	
Bowlers
Carolina Nascimento	22	Right-handed	Right-arm medium	
Nicole Monteiro	32	Right-handed	Right-arm medium	
Maria Ribeiro	23	Right-handed	Right-arm medium	

Updated on 11 September 2023.

== Records and statistics ==
International Match Summary — Brazil Women

Last updated 30 July 2026

Playing Record
Format	M	W	L	T	NR	Inaugural Match
Twenty20 Internationals	77	55	21	1	0	23 August 2018

=== Twenty20 International ===
- Highest team total: 273/1 v. Mexico on 26 September 2024 at Poços Oval, Poços de Caldas.
- Highest individual score: 144*, Laura Agatha v. Mexico on 26 September 2024 at Poços Oval, Poços de Caldas.
- Best individual bowling figures: 9/4, Laura Cardoso v. Lesotho on 9 April 2026 at Botswana Cricket Association Oval 2, Gaborone.

T20I record versus other nations

Records complete to WT20I #2941. Last updated 30 July 2026.

Opponent	M	W	L	T	NR	First match	First win
ICC Associate members
Argentina	16	16	0	0	0	4 October 2019	4 October 2019
Botswana	4	4	0	0	0	12 June 2022	12 June 2022
Cameroon	1	1	0	0	0	11 June 2025	11 June 2025
Canada	6	2	4	0	0	21 October 2021	21 October 2021
Cayman Islands	1	1	0	0	0	28 September 2024	28 September 2024
Chile	4	4	0	0	0	23 August 2018	23 August 2018
Germany	1	1	0	0	0	11 June 2022	11 June 2022
Isle of Man	2	2	0	0	0	31 August 2025	31 August 2025
Jersey	3	3	0	0	0	3 September 2025	3 September 2025
Kenya	1	0	1	0	0	15 June 2022	
Lesotho	1	1	0	0	0	9 April 2026	9 April 2026
Malawi	4	4	0	0	0	3 June 2025	3 June 2025
Mexico	4	4	0	0	0	23 August 2018	23 August 2018
Mozambique	2	2	0	0	0	7 April 2026	7 April 2026
Nigeria	6	3	3	0	0	9 June 2022	4 June 2025
Peru	2	2	0	0	0	4 October 2019	4 October 2019
Rwanda	4	0	3	1	0	10 June 2022	
Sierra Leone	1	1	0	0	0	12 June 2025	12 June 2025
Spain	2	2	0	0	0	29 July 2026	29 July 2026
Switzerland	1	1	0	0	0	29 July 2026	29 July 2026
Tanzania	2	0	2	0	0	16 June 2022	
Uganda	2	0	2	0	0	14 June 2022	
United States	6	0	6	0	0	18 October 2021	
Zambia	1	1	0	0	0	8 April 2026	8 April 2026

== See also ==
- Brazil national cricket team
- List of Brazil women Twenty20 International cricketers
