= Roberta Moretti Avery =

Brazilian cricketer

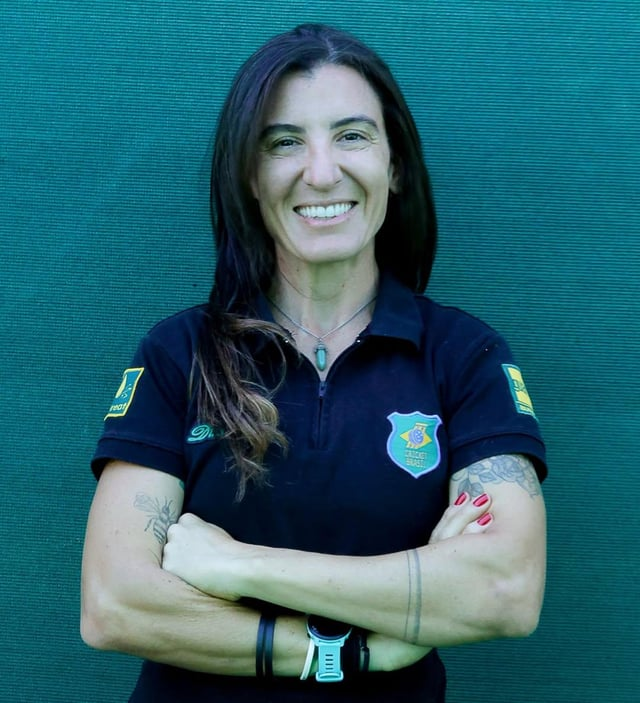

Personal information
- Full name: Roberta de Melo Moretti
- Born: 9 July 1985 (age 41); Poços de Caldas, Brazil
- Nickname: Big Mom
- Batting: Right-handed
- Bowling: Right-arm leg-break
- Role: All-rounder

International information
- National side: Brazil
- T20I debut (cap 2): 23 August 2018 v Mexico
- Last T20I: 12 June 2025 v Sierra Leone

Career statistics
Competition	T20I
Matches	57
Runs scored	1009
Batting average	30.57
100s/50s	0/4
Top score	77*
Balls bowled	281
Wickets	29
Bowling average	7.41
5 wickets in innings	0
10 wickets in match	0
Best bowling	3/1
Catches/stumpings	23/–
- Source: ESPNcricinfo, 4 September 2025

Roberta de Melo Moretti Avery (born 9 July 1985) is a Brazilian former international cricketer who captained of the Brazil women's national cricket team. She is currently the president of the Brazilian Cricket Confederation.

== Career ==
=== Early life and career ===
Moretti was born in Poços de Caldas, Minas Gerais into a sporting family: her parents played golf. She initially played golf in her hometown, until the age of 16, being part of Brazilian team for the Youth South American team, in Uruguay 2000 competition. She then spent some time in the UK, before returning to Brazil in 2010. During her brief stay in UK, she approached Liam Cook and asked him to conduct few coaching sessions for her.

Her alternative sport was handball, as a goalkeeper for Poços de Caldas team until the age of 17. Moretti did not play cricket until the age of 27, when she was invited by her spouse to join the soft ball league, playing alongside the first participants from the Brazilian Cricket Confederation development program. She was inspired to pursue her interest in the sport of cricket due to her husband's involvement in cricket projects. She was part of Cricket Poços team on the first Brazilian Women's National league, in 2013 and subsequently selected as part of the national team in 2014, making her debut in April 2014.

In addition, she also runs a fruit export business in Brazil. She currently holds a key position as an administrator at Cricket Brazil. She also teaches the sport to kids in different schools during her spare time and also regarded as a fitness fanatic as she trains at least four hours per day at the high-performance centre.

=== International career ===
In 2014, Moretti was selected to be part of the national women's cricket team in Brazil. She was the first cricketer for Brazil, male or female, to score a century in a Twenty20 match.

Moretti had her breakthrough in golf in 2017, after being top 5 on National Ranking and selected for the Brazilian team for the Copa Los Andes, in Bolívia, and Copa Srta. Fay Crocker, in Uruguay, in 2017. She was also part of the Brazilian doubles on Taça Pee-Wee, played in São Fernando Golf Club, Cotia. Moretti retired from competitive golf in July 2018.

In March 2017, Moretti was named captain of Brazil's squad ahead of the Iguassu Cup, a bilateral tour played against Argentina. As an allusion to her relatively mature age and leading status in Brazilian cricket, she has been nicknamed "Big Mom". She was also invited to be a part of the CanAm team on Philadelphia Cricket Festival, captained by Claire Taylor in that year. CanAm was the only women's team in the men's competition.

Moretti made her T20I debut for Brazil on 23 August 2018, against Mexico, in the opening fixture of the 2018 South American Women's Cricket Championship. In the summer of 2019, she trained in England at the Bexley Cricket Club. In October 2019, Brazil women won the 2019 South American Cricket Championship, with Moretti finishing as the leading run-scorer of the tournament with 116 runs in five matches.

In April 2021, during the COVID-19 pandemic, Moretti took to social media to discuss mental health issues during the pandemic. The following month, she was one of forty women selected to be mentored for the ICC 100% Cricket Future Leaders Programme.

== Presidency of the Brazilian Cricket Confederation ==
In 2025, Roberta Moretti Avery was elected president of the Brazilian Cricket Confederation (CBCR), becoming the first woman predident of national cricket confederation in the Americas. Under her leadership, the sport has expanded its athlete base and social projects, with a notable increase in the women's game.
