= Mexico women's national cricket team =

Cricket team

Mexico
- Flag of Mexico
- Nickname: Jaguars
- Association: Mexico Cricket Association

Personnel
- Captain: Caroline Owen

International Cricket Council
- ICC status: Associate member (2017); Affiliate member (2004)
- ICC region: Americas
ICC Rankings	Current	Best-ever
T20I	unranked	46th (3 Aug 2019)

T20 Internationals
- First T20I: v. Brazil at Los Pinos Polo Club, Bogotá; 23 August 2018
- Last T20I: v. Argentina at Texcoco Municipal Baseball Complex, Texcoco de Mora; 25 October 2026
T20Is	Played	Won/Lost
Total	20	6/13 (1 tie, 0 no results)
This year	3	0/3 (0 ties, 0 no results)
- As of 25 October 2026

The Mexico women's national cricket team, nicknamed the Jaguars (Las Jaguares), represents the country of Mexico in women's cricket matches.

In April 2018, the International Cricket Council (ICC) granted full Women's Twenty20 International (WT20I) status to all its members. Therefore, all Twenty20 matches played between Mexico women and another international side after 1 July 2018 have the full WT20I status.

Mexico's first WT20I matches were contested as part of the South American Women's Championships in August 2018 against Brazil, Chile and Peru however Peru's matches were not classified as WT20Is as not all of their players met the ICC residency requirements. Mexico lost four matches and won two to finish third on the table.

== Tournament history ==
=== South American Cricket Championship ===
- 2018: Group Stage
- 2019: Group Stage

=== Central American Cricket Championship ===
- 2019: Winner

== Records and statistics ==
International Match Summary — Mexico Women

Last updated 25 October 2026

Playing Record
Format	M	W	L	T	NR	Inaugural Match
Twenty20 Internationals	20	6	13	1	0	23 August 2018

=== Twenty20 International ===
- Highest team total: 164/8 v. Costa Rica on 26 April 2019 at Las Cabellerizas, Naucalpan.
- Highest individual score: 52*, Caroline Owen v. Chile on 4 October 2019 at Lima Cricket and Football Club, Lima.
- Best individual bowling figures: 4/15, Tania Salcedo v. Costa Rica on 16 November 2024 at Reforma Athletic Club, Naucalpan.

T20I record versus other nations

Records complete to WT20I #3048. Last updated 25 October 2026.

Opponent	M	W	L	T	NR	First match	First win
ICC Associate members
Argentina	5	0	5	0	0	3 October 2019	
Brazil	4	0	4	0	0	23 August 2018	
Cayman Islands	2	1	1	0	0	27 September 2024	27 September 2024
Chile	3	0	3	0	0	24 August 2018	
Costa Rica	5	4	0	1	0	26 April 2019	26 April 2019
Peru	1	1	0	0	0	5 October 2019	5 October 2019

== See also ==
- List of Mexico women Twenty20 International cricketers
