= Argentina women's national cricket team =

Cricket team

Argentina
- Flag of Argentina
- Nickname: Las Flamingos
- Association: Argentine Cricket Association

Personnel
- Captain: Maria Castiñeiras
- Coach: Gary Grewal

International Cricket Council
- ICC status: Associate member (1974)
- ICC region: Americas
ICC Rankings	Current	Best-ever
T20I	57th	28th (24 Apr 2019)

International cricket
- First international: 18 June 2007 v Argentine Development XI

T20 Internationals
- First T20I: v Peru at Lima Cricket and Football Club, Lima; 3 October 2019
- Last T20I: v Mexico at Texcoco Municipal Baseball Complex, Texcoco de Mora; 25 October 2026
T20Is	Played	Won/Lost
Total	48	19/28 (0 ties, 1 no result)
This year	10	8/1 (0 ties, 1 no result)
- As of 25 October 2026

The Argentina national women's cricket team is the team that represents the country of Argentina in international women's cricket matches. They played their first match against a national development XI on 18 June 2007, and took part in an Americas Cup tournament in Toronto, Ontario, Canada in August 2007.

== History ==
In April 2018, the International Cricket Council (ICC) granted full Women's Twenty20 International (WT20I) status to all its members. Therefore, all Twenty20 matches played between Argentina women and another international side after 1 July 2018 have the full WT20I status. In 2018, Sian Kelly was appointed as the team's coach, becoming the first female head coach of the Argentine women's cricket team.

Argentina made their WT20I debut at the 2019 South American Cricket Championship in Lima, in October 2019, where they were defeated by Brazil in the final.

In December 2020, the ICC announced the qualification pathway for the 2023 ICC Women's T20 World Cup. Argentina were named in the 2021 ICC Women's T20 World Cup Americas Qualifier regional group, alongside three other teams.

In 2026, Gary Grewal was appointed as head coach of the Argentina women’s national cricket team, with María Castiñeiras named captain. Under their leadership, Argentina embarked on a period of significant progress.

In July 2026, Argentina hosted Canada in a seven-match Women’s Twenty20 International (WT20I) bilateral series. Fielding a youthful squad with an average age of 20, including five debutants, Argentina won the series 5–1. The result marked one of the most significant achievements in the team’s history and propelled Argentina from 62nd to 46th in the ICC Women’s T20I Team Rankings.

== Tournament history ==
=== Women's World T20 ===
Twenty20 World Cup Record
Year	Round	Position	GP	W	L	T	NR
(England) 2009	Did not qualify						
(Cricket West Indies) 2010	Did not qualify						
(Sri Lanka) 2012	Did not qualify						
(Bangladesh) 2014	Did not qualify						
(India) 2016	Did not qualify						
(Cricket West Indies) 2018	Did not qualify						
(Australia) 2020	Did not qualify						
(South Africa) 2023	Did not qualify						
(United Arab Emirates) 2024	Did not qualify						
(England) 2026	Did not qualify						
Total	0/9	0 Titles	0	0	0	0	0

=== Women's World Cup ===
World Cup record
Year	Round	Position	GP	W	L	T	NR
(England) 1973	Did not qualify/No women's ODI status						
(India) 1978	Did not qualify/No women's ODI status						
(New Zealand) 1982	Did not qualify/No women's ODI status						
(Australia) 1988	Did not qualify/No women's ODI status						
(England) 1993	Did not qualify/No women's ODI status						
(India) 1997	Did not qualify/No women's ODI status						
(New Zealand) 2000	Did not qualify/No women's ODI status						
(South Africa) 2005	Did not qualify/No women's ODI status						
(Australia) 2009	Did not qualify/No women's ODI status						
(India) 2013	Did not qualify/No women's ODI status						
(England) 2017	Did not qualify/No women's ODI status						
(New Zealand) 2022	Did not qualify/No women's ODI status						
(India) 2025	To be determined						
Total	0/12	0 Titles	0	0	0	0	0

=== ICC Women's T20 World Cup Americas Qualifier ===
ICC Women's T20 World Cup Americas Qualifier records
Year	Round	Position	GP	W	L	T	NR
(United States) 2019	Did not participate						
(Mexico) 2021	Round-robin	4/4	6	0	6	0	0
(Canada) 2023	Round-robin	4/4	6	0	6	0	0
(Argentina) 2025	Round-robin	4/4	6	1	5	0	0
Total	3/4	–	18	1	17	0	0

=== South American Cricket Championship ===
South American Women's Cricket Championship records
Year	Round	Position	GP	W	L	T	NR
(Brazil) 2007	The full information of the tournament have not found						
(Argentina) 2009	The full information of the tournament have not found						
(Chile) 2010	The full information of the tournament have not found						
(Brazil) 2011	The full information of the tournament have not found						
(Argentina) 2013	The full information of the tournament have not found						
(Peru) 2014	The full information of the tournament have not found						
(Chile) 2015	The full information of the tournament have not found						
(Brazil) 2016	The full information of the tournament have not found						
(Argentina) 2017	The full information of the tournament have not found						
(Colombia) 2018	Did not participate						
(Peru) 2019	Runner-up	2/5	5	3	2	0	0
(Brazil) 2022	Round-robin	3/4	4	2	2	0	0
(Brazil) 2024	Round-robin	3/8	4	2	2	0	0
Total	3/13	–	13	7	6	0	0

== Current squad ==
This lists all the players who played for Argentina in the 2024 South American Cricket Championship.

Name	Age	Batting style	Bowling style	Notes
Batters
Maria Castiñeiras	27	Right-handed	Right-arm medium	
Martina Quinn	28	Right-handed	Right-arm medium	
All-rounders
Lucia Taylor	28	Right-handed	Right-arm medium	
Alison Stocks	32	Right-handed	Right-arm medium	Captain
Mariana Martinez	28	Right-handed	Right-arm medium	
Albertina Galan	24	Right-handed	Right-arm off spin	
Alison Prince	40	Right-handed	Right-arm medium	
Alina Emch	19	Right-handed	Right-arm medium	
Wicket-keepers
Malena Lollo	26	Right-handed		
Naara Patron Fuentes	28	Right-handed		
Pace Bowlers
Constanza Sosa	21	Right-handed	Right-arm medium	
Tamara Basile	25	Right-handed	Right-arm medium	

Updated as on 29 Sep 2024

== Records and statistics ==
International Match Summary — Argentina Women

Last updated 25 October 2026

Playing Record
Format	M	W	L	T	NR	Inaugural Match
Twenty20 Internationals	48	19	28	0	1	3 October 2019

=== Twenty20 International ===
- Highest team total: 427/1 v. Chile, 13 October 2023 at St Albans Club, Buenos Aires.
- Highest individual score: 169, Lucia Taylor v. Chile, 13 October 2023 at St Albans Club, Buenos Aires.
- Best individual bowling figures: 7/3, Alison Stocks v. Peru, 14 October 2022 at Sao Fernando Polo and Cricket Club, Itaguaí.

T20I record versus other nations

Records complete to WT20I #3048. Last updated 25 October 2026.

Opponent	M	W	L	T	NR	First match	First win
ICC Associate members
Brazil	16	0	16	0	0	4 October 2019	
Canada	13	6	6	0	1	18 October 2021	11 March 2025
Cayman Islands	1	1	0	0	0	26 September 2024	26 September 2024
Chile	4	4	0	0	0	5 October 2019	5 October 2019
Mexico	5	5	0	0	0	3 October 2019	3 October 2019
Peru	3	3	0	0	0	3 October 2019	3 October 2019
United States	6	0	6	0	0	21 October 2021	

== See also ==
- Argentina national cricket team
- List of Argentina women Twenty20 International cricketers
