= Chile women's national cricket team =

Chile
- Flag of Chile
- Nickname: Las Loicas
- Association: Chilean Cricket Association

Personnel
- Captain: Jeannette Garcés

International Cricket Council
- ICC status: Associate member (2017); Affiliate member (2002)
- ICC region: Americas
ICC Rankings	Current	Best-ever
T20I	unranked	43rd (3 Aug 2019)

T20 Internationals
- First T20I: v Brazil at Los Pinos Polo Club 2, Bogotá; 23 August 2018
- Last T20I: v Costa Rica at Pocos Oval, Poços de Caldas; 25 September 2026
T20Is	Played	Won/Lost
Total	17	4/13 (0 ties, 0 no results)
This year	5	0/5 (0 ties, 0 no results)
- As of 25 September 2026

The Chile women's national cricket team, nicknamed Las Loicas, represents the country of Chile in women's cricket matches.

In April 2018, the International Cricket Council (ICC) granted full Women's Twenty20 International (WT20I) status to all its members. Therefore, all Twenty20 matches played between Chile women and another international side after 1 July 2018 have the full WT20I status.

== International Cricket ==
Chile's first WT20I matches were contested as part of the South American Women's Championships in August 2018 against Brazil, Mexico and Peru however Peru's matches were not classified as WT20Is as not all of their players met the ICC residency requirements. Chile won four matches and lost two to finish second on the table. In the final against Brazil, Chile lost by a margin of 92 runs.

== Tournament history ==
=== South American Cricket Championship ===
- 2018: Runners-up
- 2019: Group Stage

== Records and statistics ==
International Match Summary — Chile Women

Last updated 25 September 2026

Playing Record
Format	M	W	L	T	NR	Inaugural Match
Twenty20 Internationals	17	4	13	0	0	23 August 2018

=== Twenty20 International ===
- Highest team total: 147/5 (16 overs) v. Mexico on 4 October 2019 at Lima Cricket and Football Club, Lima.
- Highest individual score: 30, Nicole Conejeros v. Mexico on 24 August 2018 at Los Pinos Polo Club 2, Bogotá.
- Best individual bowling figures: 4/11, Jessica Miranda v. Mexico on 26 August 2018 at Los Pinos Polo Club 2, Bogotá.

T20I record versus other nations

Records complete to WT20I #3028. Last updated 25 September 2026.

Opponent	M	W	L	T	NR	First match	First win
ICC Associate members
Argentina	4	0	4	0	0	5 October 2019	
Brazil	4	0	4	0	0	23 August 2018	
Costa Rica	5	0	5	0	0	24 April 2026	
Mexico	3	3	0	0	0	24 August 2018	24 August 2018
Peru	1	1	0	0	0	6 October 2019	6 October 2019

== See also ==
- List of Chile women Twenty20 International cricketers
- Chile national cricket team
