= 2019 South American Cricket Championship – Women's tournament =

2019 South American Cricket Championship – Women's event
- Dates: 3 – 6 October 2019
- Cricket format: Women's Twenty20 International
- Tournament format: Round-robin
- Host: Peru
- Champions: Brazil (4th title)
- Runners-up: Argentina
- Participants: 5
- Matches: 11
- Player of the series: (Peru) Samantha Hickman
- Most runs: (Brazil) Roberta Moretti Avery (116)
- Most wickets: (Argentina) Alison Stocks (8) (Brazil) Nicole Monteiro (8) (Peru) Samantha Hickman (8)

The 2019 South American Cricket Championship was a cricket tournament that took place in Lima, Peru from 3 to 6 October 2019. This was the second edition of the women's South American Cricket Championship in which matches were eligible for Women's Twenty20 International (WT20I) status, since the ICC granted T20I status to matches between all of its Members. Brazil were the defending champions from the 2018 edition.

The five participating teams were the national sides of Peru, Argentina, Brazil, Chile and Mexico. Brazil retained their title by winning all four of their matches in the round-robin stage and then defeating Argentina by 4 wickets in the final.

== Squads ==
Argentina	Brazil	Chile	Mexico	Peru
Veronica Vasquez (c); Agustina Cullen; Julieta Cullen; Maria Castiñeiras; Carla Comaschi; Martina Del Valle; Priscilla Gauna; Lucía Iglesias; Malena Lollo; Mariana Martinez; Constanza Sosa; Alison Stocks; Lucia Taylor; Catalina Vecchi	Roberta Moretti Avery (c); Elisa Carvalho; Maria Costa; Renata de Sousa; Denise de Souza; Julia Faustino; Lara Moisés; Nicole Monteiro; Alice Nascimento; Rayane Oliveira; Gabriella Silva; Laura Silva; Lindsay Vilas Boas	Jeannette Gonzalez (c); Nicole Conejeros; Francisca Galvez; Juliette Guardia; Jessica Miranda; Franchesca Moya; Constanza Oyarce; Magdelena Pino; Tiara Pueye; Yaritza Rodriguez; Maria Saavedra; Camila Valdes	Caroline Owen (c); Anyel Aguilar; Celeste Avila; Anatza Castrejon; Magdalena De Gante; Rosela Espinosa; Aileen Fernandez; Erika Fernandez; Sara Hernandez; Ana Katsuda; Ana Montenegro; Gabriella Morales; Maria Pacheco; Tania Salcedo; Aida Tovar	Milka Esteban Linares (c); Samantha Hickman; Evelyn Armas; Maria Cabrera; Stacy Diaz; Olivia Espinoza; Michelle Horna; Julissa Li; Stefania Mariños; Magdelena Pino; Maria Rodriguez; Angiella Rutti; Adriana Vasquez; Alexandra Vasquez; Maria Vera; Kyara Villanella

== Round-robin stage ==
=== Points table ===
Team	P	W	L	T	NR	Pts	NRR	Status
Brazil	4	4	0	0	0	12	+5.024	Advanced to the final
Argentina	4	3	1	0	0	9	+2.803	Advanced to the final
Chile	4	2	2	0	0	6	–1.844	
Mexico	4	1	3	0	0	3	–3.840	
Peru	4	0	4	0	0	0	–5.188	

=== Fixtures ===
3 October 2019
08:00
Scorecard

Argentina; 152/5 (17 overs)	v	Peru; 60/5 (17 overs)
Martina Del Valle 53 (48); Samantha Hickman 2/20 (4 overs)		Samantha Hickman 20* (19); Agustina Cullen 2/4 (3 overs)

Argentina won by 92 runs
Lima Cricket and Football Club, Lima
Umpires: Ken Patel (Can) and Ashish Shah (Can)

- Argentina won the toss and elected to bat.
- The match was reduced to 17 overs per side.
- Evelyn Armas, Maria Cabrera, Stacy Diaz, Olivia Espinoza, Milka Linares, Samantha Hickman, Angiella Rutti, Adriana Vasquez, Alexandra Vasquez, Maria Vera, Kyara Villanella (Per), Maria Castiñeiras, Carla Comaschi, Agustina Cullen, Martina Del Valle, Priscilla Gauna, Malena Lollo, Constanza Sosa, Alison Stocks, Lucia Taylor, Veronica Vasquez and Catalina Vecchi (Arg) all made their WT20I debuts.

3 October 2019
11:30
Scorecard

Chile; 27 (10.5 overs)	v	Brazil; 28/1 (4.1 overs)
Tiara Pueye 5 (8); Nicole Monteiro 3/0 (2 overs)		Lindsay Vilas Boas 13 (13); Jessica Miranda 1/15 (2 overs)

Brazil won by 9 wickets
Lima Cricket and Football Club, Lima
Umpires: Deepak Kumar (Can) and Ashish Shah (Can)

- Brazil won the toss and elected to field.
- The match was reduced to 17 (?) overs per side.
- Elisa Batista, Lara Moisés, Laura Silva (Bra), Constanza Oyarce and Camila Valdes (Chi) all made their WT20I debuts.

3 October 2019
15:00
Scorecard

Argentina; 208/4 (18 overs)	v	Mexico; 79 (15.5 overs)
Malena Lollo 53* (42); Magdalena De Gante 3/18 (3 overs)		Aida Tovar 12 (30); Lucia Taylor 3/11 (3.5 overs)

Argentina won by 129 runs
Lima Cricket and Football Club, Lima
Umpires: Ken Patel (Can) and Ashish Shah (Can)

- Mexico won the toss and elected to field.
- The match was reduced to 18 overs per side.
- Julieta Cullen (Arg) and Arantza Castrejon (Mex) both made their WT20I debuts.

4 October 2019
08:00
Scorecard

Brazil; 202/3 (17 overs)	v	Peru; 40/5 (17 overs)
Roberta Moretti Avery 68* (43); Samantha Hickman 1/19 (4 overs)		Samantha Hickman 5* (4); Lara Moisés 1/1 (2 overs)

Brazil won by 162 runs
Lima Cricket and Football Club, Lima
Umpires: Oscar Andrade (Ber) and Deepak Kumar (Can)

- Brazil won the toss and elected to bat.
- The match was reduced to 17 overs per side.
- Michelle Horna, Julissa Li (Per), Maria Costa and Rayane Oliveira (Bra) all made their WT20I debuts.

4 October 2019
11:30
Scorecard

Mexico; 145/6 (18 overs)	v	Chile; 147/5 (16 overs)
Caroline Owen 52* (38); Nicole Conejeros 2/40 (4 overs)		Jessica Miranda 30 (20); Caroline Owen 2/30 (4 overs)

Chile won by 5 wickets
Lima Cricket and Football Club, Lima
Umpires: Oscar Andrade (Ber) and Rakesh Jain (Per)

- Chile won the toss and elected to field.
- The match was reduced to 18 overs per side.
- Ana Katsuda (Mex) made her WT20I debut.

4 October 2019
15:00
Scorecard

Argentina; 70 (13.1 overs)	v	Brazil; 71/4 (14.2 overs)
Alison Stocks 19* (26); Julia Faustino 2/12 (2 overs)		Denise de Souza 26 (29); Alison Stocks 3/2 (3 overs)

Brazil won by 6 wickets
Lima Cricket and Football Club, Lima
Umpires: Deepak Kumar (Can) and Rakesh Jain (Per)

- Brazil won the toss and elected to field.
- The match was reduced to 17 (?) overs per side.
- Mariana Martinez (Arg) made her WT20I debut.

5 October 2019
08:00
Scorecard

Mexico; 143/3 (14 overs)	v	Peru; 124/6 (14 overs)
Ana Montenegro 51 (31); Samantha Hickman 3/23 (4 overs)		Samantha Hickman 53 (36); Caroline Owen 2/21 (3 overs)

Mexico won by 19 runs
Lima Cricket and Football Club, Lima
Umpires: Sandeep Harnal (Can) and Ashish Shah (Can)

- Mexico won the toss and elected to bat.
- The match was reduced to 14 overs per side.
- Maria Rodriguez (Per) made her WT20I debut.

5 October 2019
11:30
Scorecard

Chile; 58/7 (17 overs)	v	Argentina; 60/2 (7.4 overs)
Nicole Conejeros 20 (21); Mariana Martinez 2/11 (4 overs)		Lucia Taylor 21 (19); Jessica Miranda 1/20 (3.4 overs)

Argentina won by 8 wickets
Lima Cricket and Football Club, Lima
Umpires: Sandeep Harnal (Can) and Tony Sanford (Per)

- Chile won the toss and elected to bat.
- The match was reduced to 17 overs per side.

5 October 2019
15:00
Scorecard

Brazil; 152/3 (14 overs)	v	Mexico; 54/6 (14 overs)
Lindsay Vilas Boas 45* (54); Tania Salcedo 3/39 (4 overs)		Ana Montenegro 22* (36); Lara Moisés 2/13 (4 overs)

Brazil won by 98 runs
Lima Cricket and Football Club, Lima
Umpires: Ashish Shah (Can) and Tony Sanford (Per)

- Mexico won the toss and elected to field.
- The match was reduced to 14 overs per side.

6 October 2019
08:00
Scorecard

Peru; 64/4 (15 overs)	v	Chile; 65/3 (9.2 overs)
Milka Linares 15* (27); Nicole Conejeros 2/8 (3 overs)		Nicole Conejeros 16* (17); Samantha Hickman 2/5 (2 overs)

Chile won by 7 wickets
Lima Cricket and Football Club, Lima
Umpires: Rakesh Jain (Per) and Ashish Shah (Can)

- Chile won the toss and elected to field.
- The match was reduced to 15 overs per side.
- Magdelena Pino (Chi) made her WT20I debut.

== Final ==
6 October 2019
11:30
Scorecard

Argentina; 73 (16.1 overs)	v	Brazil; 74/6 (17 overs)
Veronica Vasquez 26 (38); Nicole Monteiro 4/15 (4 overs)		Renata Sousa 17 (39); Mariana Martinez 2/17 (4 overs)

Brazil won by 4 wickets
Lima Cricket and Football Club, Lima
Umpires: Sandeep Harnal (Can) and Ashish Shah (Can)

- Brazil won the toss and elected to field.

== See also ==
- 2019 South American Cricket Championship – Men's tournament
