= Peru women's national cricket team =

Cricket team

Peru
- Flag of Peru
- Association: Peru Cricket Association

International Cricket Council
- ICC status: Associate member (2017); Affiliate member (2007)
- ICC region: Americas
ICC Rankings	Current	Best-ever
T20I	50th	46th (6 Feb 2019)

T20 Internationals
- First T20I: v. Argentina at Lima Cricket and Football Club, Lima; 3 October 2019
- Last T20I: v. Argentina at Sao Fernando Polo and Cricket Club (Campo Sede), Itaguaí; 16 October 2022
T20Is	Played	Won/Lost
Total	7	0/7 (0 ties, 0 no results)
This year	0	0/0 (0 ties, 0 no results)
- As of 1 January 2024

The Peru women's national cricket team represents the Republic of Peru in women's cricket matches.

In April 2018, the International Cricket Council (ICC) granted full Women's Twenty20 International (WT20I) status to all its members. Therefore, all Twenty20 matches played between Peru women and another international side after 1 July 2018 have the full WT20I status.

Peru was part of the South American Women's Championships in August 2018 with Brazil, Chile and Mexico, but Peru's matches were not classified as WT20Is as not all of their players met the ICC residency requirements. Peru won one match and lost five to finish at the bottom of the table. Peru also played in the 2019 edition of the championship, this time with full WT20I status awarded to their matches.

== Records and statistics ==
International Match Summary — Peru Women

Last updated 16 October 2022

Playing Record
Format	M	W	L	T	NR	Inaugural Match
Twenty20 Internationals	7	0	7	0	0	3 October 2019

=== Twenty20 International ===
- Highest team total: 124/6 v. Mexico on 5 October 2019 at Lima Cricket and Football Club, Lima.
- Highest individual score: 53, Samantha Hickman v. Mexico on 5 October 2019 at Lima Cricket and Football Club, Lima.
- Best individual bowling figures: 3/23, Samantha Hickman v. Mexico on 5 October 2019 at Lima Cricket and Football Club, Lima.

T20I record versus other nations

Records complete to WT20I #1281. Last updated 16 October 2022.

Opponent	M	W	L	T	NR	First match	First win
ICC Associate members
Argentina	3	0	3	0	0	3 October 2019	
Brazil	2	0	2	0	0	4 October 2019	
Chile	1	0	1	0	0	6 October 2019	
Mexico	1	0	1	0	0	5 October 2019	

== See also ==
- List of Peru women Twenty20 International cricketers
