= Women's Twenty20 International =

Type of cricket match

- Highest governing body: International Cricket Council
- Nicknames: WT20I
- First played: 5 August 2004

Characteristics
- Team members: ICC members
- Mixed-sex: No
- Type: Outdoor Game
- Equipment: Ball, Bat, Stumps, Cricket Helmet, Thigh Guard, Batting Pads, Abdominal Guard, Gloves, etc
- Venue: Cricket Stadium

Presence
- Country or region: Worldwide

Women's Twenty20 International (WT20I) is the shortest form of women's international cricket recognized by the International Cricket Council (ICC). A women's Twenty20 international is a 20 overs-per-side cricket match between any two ICC members. The very first Women's Twenty20 International match was played on 5 August 2004 between England and New Zealand at Hove, six months before the first Twenty20 International match was played between two men's teams. The Women's T20 World Cup, the highest-level event in the format, was first held in 2009.

In April 2018, the ICC granted full WT20I status to all its members. Therefore, all Twenty20 matches played between two international sides after 1 July 2018 are a full WT20I. A month after the conclusion of the 2018 Women's Twenty20 Asia Cup, which took place in June 2018, the ICC retrospectively gave all the fixtures in the tournament full WT20I status. On 22 November 2021, in the 2021 ICC Women's T20 World Cup Asia Qualifier tournament, the match between Hong Kong and Nepal was the 1,000th WT20I to be played.

== Involved nations ==
The ICC granted Women's Twenty20 International (WT20I) status to all its members from 1 July 2018. As of April 2025, 93 nations have played WT20Is.

The full list of teams who have played full WT20I matches, with the date of their first match, is as follows:

1. England (5 August 2004)
2. New Zealand (5 August 2004)
3. Australia (2 September 2005)
4. India (5 August 2006)
5. South Africa (10 August 2007)
6. Ireland (27 June 2008)
7. West Indies (27 June 2008)
8. Netherlands (1 July 2008)
9. Pakistan (25 May 2009)
10. Sri Lanka (12 June 2009)
11. Bangladesh (28 August 2012)
12. Malaysia (3 June 2018)
13. Thailand (3 June 2018)
14. Scotland (7 July 2018)
15. Uganda (7 July 2018)
16. United Arab Emirates (7 July 2018)
17. Papua New Guinea (7 July 2018)
18. Singapore (9 August 2018)
19. Botswana (20 August 2018)
20. Lesotho (20 August 2018)
21. Malawi (20 August 2018)
22. Namibia (20 August 2018)
23. Mozambique (20 August 2018)
24. Sierra Leone (20 August 2018)
25. Brazil (23 August 2018)
26. Mexico (23 August 2018)
27. Chile (23 August 2018)
28. China (3 November 2018)
29. South Korea (3 November 2018)
30. Zimbabwe (5 January 2019)
31. Nepal (12 January 2019)
32. Hong Kong (12 January 2019)
33. Indonesia (12 January 2019)
34. Myanmar (12 January 2019)
35. Bhutan (13 January 2019)
36. Nigeria (26 January 2019)
37. Rwanda (26 January 2019)
38. Kuwait (18 February 2019)
39. Kenya (6 April 2019)
40. Costa Rica (26 April 2019)
41. Vanuatu (6 May 2019)
42. Japan (6 May 2019)
43. Fiji (6 May 2019)
44. Samoa (6 May 2019)
45. Tanzania (6 May 2019)
46. Canada (17 May 2019)
47. United States (17 May 2019)
48. Guernsey (31 May 2019)
49. Jersey (31 May 2019)
50. Mali (18 June 2019)
51. Germany (26 June 2019)
52. France (31 July 2019)
53. Austria (31 July 2019)
54. Norway (31 July 2019)
55. Argentina (3 October 2019)
56. Peru (3 October 2019)
57. Maldives (2 December 2019)
58. Belize (13 December 2019)
59. Philippines (21 December 2019)
60. Oman (17 January 2020)
61. Qatar (17 January 2020)
62. Italy (9 August 2021)
63. Sweden (29 August 2021)
64. Eswatini (9 September 2021)
65. Cameroon (12 September 2021)
66. Belgium (25 September 2021)
67. Bahrain (20 March 2022)
68. Saudi Arabia (20 March 2022)
69. Ghana (28 March 2022)
70. Gambia (29 March 2022)
71. Spain (5 May 2022)
72. Denmark (28 May 2022)
73. Barbados (29 July 2022)
74. Malta (27 August 2022)
75. Romania (27 August 2022)
76. Greece (9 September 2022)
77. Serbia (10 September 2022)
78. Isle of Man (12 November 2022)
79. Cambodia (21 December 2022)
80. Turkey (29 May 2023)
81. Estonia (26 August 2023)
82. Cook Islands (1 September 2023)
83. Luxembourg (5 September 2023)
84. Mongolia (19 September 2023)
85. Gibraltar (20 April 2024)
86. Czech Republic (8 June 2024)
87. Croatia (14 June 2024)
88. Cyprus (17 June 2024)
89. Cayman Islands (26 September 2024)
90. Bulgaria (12 October 2024)
91. Portugal (7 April 2025)
92. Switzerland (28 May 2025)
93. Finland (18 July 2025)
94. Zambia (6 April 2026)

== Rankings ==
Before October 2018, ICC did not maintain a separate Twenty20 ranking for the women's game, instead aggregating performance over all three forms of the game into one overall women's teams ranking. In January 2018, ICC granted international status to all matches between associate nations and announced plan to launch separate T20I rankings for women. In October 2018 the T20I rankings were launched with separate ODI rankings for Full Members.

ICC Women's T20I Team Rankings
| Team | Matches | Points | Rating |
|---|---|---|---|
| Australia | 28 | 8,151 | 291 |
| England | 38 | 10,504 | 276 |
| India | 49 | 12,955 | 264 |
| New Zealand | 32 | 7,966 | 249 |
| South Africa | 43 | 10,588 | 246 |
| Sri Lanka | 45 | 10,702 | 238 |
| West Indies | 33 | 7,829 | 237 |
| Pakistan | 41 | 8,675 | 212 |
| Ireland | 42 | 8,520 | 203 |
| Bangladesh | 43 | 8,371 | 195 |
| Scotland | 38 | 6,373 | 168 |
| Thailand | 65 | 9,961 | 153 |
| Papua New Guinea | 32 | 4,542 | 142 |
| Netherlands | 49 | 6,855 | 140 |
| United Arab Emirates | 49 | 6,704 | 137 |
| Zimbabwe | 40 | 4,844 | 121 |
| Uganda | 54 | 6,056 | 112 |
| Namibia | 46 | 5,043 | 110 |
| United States | 28 | 2,741 | 98 |
| Tanzania | 38 | 3,607 | 95 |
| Nepal | 51 | 4,673 | 92 |
| Hong Kong | 63 | 5,634 | 89 |
| Indonesia | 44 | 3,922 | 89 |
| Rwanda | 58 | 4,980 | 86 |
| Italy | 31 | 2,603 | 84 |
| Nigeria | 36 | 2,689 | 75 |
| Brazil | 41 | 2,909 | 71 |
| Malaysia | 54 | 3,602 | 67 |
| Vanuatu | 27 | 1,762 | 65 |
| Germany | 33 | 2,130 | 65 |
| Kenya | 24 | 1,534 | 64 |
| Jersey | 27 | 1,639 | 61 |
| Spain | 15 | 867 | 58 |
| Sweden | 19 | 986 | 52 |
| Oman | 34 | 1,708 | 50 |
| China | 37 | 1,842 | 50 |
| Cyprus | 22 | 1,080 | 49 |
| Isle of Man | 24 | 1,137 | 47 |
| Japan | 34 | 1,529 | 45 |
| Turkey | 15 | 643 | 43 |
| Switzerland | 27 | 1,146 | 42 |
| Canada | 20 | 841 | 42 |
| Myanmar | 32 | 1,344 | 42 |
| Denmark | 29 | 1,194 | 41 |
| Costa Rica | 7 | 267 | 38 |
| Sierra Leone | 26 | 989 | 38 |
| Bhutan | 21 | 771 | 37 |
| Argentina | 18 | 658 | 37 |
| France | 10 | 349 | 35 |
| Botswana | 32 | 1,010 | 32 |
| Gibraltar | 12 | 378 | 32 |
| Kuwait | 27 | 842 | 31 |
| Croatia | 10 | 306 | 31 |
| Samoa | 16 | 472 | 30 |
| Austria | 26 | 689 | 27 |
| Portugal | 8 | 197 | 25 |
| Romania | 12 | 282 | 24 |
| Guernsey | 13 | 267 | 21 |
| Norway | 23 | 433 | 19 |
| Malawi | 31 | 556 | 18 |
| Fiji | 15 | 263 | 18 |
| Serbia | 19 | 291 | 15 |
| Czech Republic | 28 | 403 | 14 |
| Greece | 31 | 439 | 14 |
| Estonia | 21 | 283 | 13 |
| Qatar | 24 | 299 | 12 |
| Finland | 11 | 136 | 12 |
| Mozambique | 22 | 221 | 10 |
| Malta | 15 | 136 | 9 |
| Cameroon | 18 | 158 | 9 |
| Luxembourg | 19 | 157 | 8 |
| Lesotho | 17 | 50 | 3 |
| Mongolia | 20 | 42 | 2 |
| Philippines | 22 | 40 | 2 |
| Singapore | 29 | 11 | 0 |
| Eswatini | 10 | 0 | 0 |
| Saudi Arabia | 8 | 0 | 0 |
| Cook Islands | 12 | 0 | 0 |
| Chile | 7 | 0 | 0 |
| Bulgaria | 23 | 0 | 0 |
| Belgium | 15 | 0 | 0 |
| Bahrain | 24 | 0 | 0 |
Source: ICC Women's T20I Team Rankings, 25 September 2026

== See also ==
- List of women's Twenty20 International cricket grounds
- Women's Test cricket
- Women's One Day International
- Twenty20 International
