= International cricket in 2021–22 =

International cricket season

The 2021–22 international cricket season took place from September 2021 to April 2022. 29 Tests, 111 One Day Internationals (ODIs), 112 Twenty20 Internationals (T20Is), 25 Women's One Day Internationals (WODIs), 40 Women's Twenty20 Internationals (WT20Is), and two women's Test matches were scheduled to be played during this period. Additionally, a number of other T20I/WT20I matches were also scheduled to be played in series involving associate nations.

The 2021 ICC Men's T20 World Cup, the 2021 Women's Cricket World Cup Qualifier and the 2022 Women's Cricket World Cup were played in October 2021, December 2021, and March 2022 respectively, after they were all postponed due to the COVID-19 pandemic. In the final of the Men's T20 World Cup, Australia beat New Zealand by eight wickets to win their first T20 World Cup. In the final of the Women's World Cup, Australia beat England by 71 runs to win their seventh World Cup.

Qualification for the 2023 ICC Women's T20 World Cup also continued, with four more regional qualifiers taking place. In August 2021, England's planned tour of Bangladesh was postponed until 2023 due to the ongoing Covid situation and fixture congestion. Later the same month, Afghanistan's planned ODI series against Pakistan was postponed due to the situation in Afghanistan and the logistics in travelling. In November 2021, Cricket Australia officially postponed the one-off Test match between Australia and Afghanistan, due to the Taliban not supporting women's cricket.

In September 2021, New Zealand arrived in Pakistan to play three ODIs and five T20I matches. It was New Zealand's first tour of Pakistan since 2003. However, on the morning of the first ODI match, New Zealand Cricket (NZC) raised a security alert with the Pakistan Cricket Board (PCB) and the Pakistan Government, which resulted in the entire tour being called off. England were also scheduled to tour Pakistan for the first time in sixteen years to play two T20I matches. However, following New Zealand's tour being called off, the England and Wales Cricket Board (ECB) announced that the men's tour and the women's tour to the country in October 2021 had both been cancelled, due to concerns of travelling to the region.

In October, the Zimbabwe women's cricket team played their first ever WODI matches since they were granted WODI status by the International Cricket Council (ICC) in April 2021. They hosted a four-match series against Ireland, with Zimbabwe winning the first fixture.

In late November 2021, a new variant of the COVID-19 virus was discovered in southern Africa. As a result, the 2021 Women's Cricket World Cup Qualifier in Zimbabwe and the Dutch cricket team's tour of South Africa were called off. Most of the group stage matches in the Women's Cricket World Cup Qualifier had taken place, with only the first ODI between South Africa and the Netherlands being played. The eighth round of the 2019–2023 ICC Cricket World Cup League 2 in Namibia was also called off after only two of the scheduled eight matches had been played. In December 2021, the ODI matches between Pakistan and the West Indies were postponed following multiple cases of COVID-19 in the West Indies team and support staff. Later the same month, Ireland's ODI matches against the United States were also cancelled following positive COVID-19 cases in both teams.

In December 2021 and January 2022, the 72nd Ashes series was played. Australia successfully retained the Ashes by winning the first three Test matches. The fourth Test ended in a draw, with Australia winning the fifth Test by 146 runs to win the series 4–0. Later in January 2022, New Zealand's tour of Australia was postponed due to the uncertainty of the quarantine rules for when the New Zealand team returned home. The following month, Australia's tour of New Zealand was called off due no managed isolation quarantine (MIQ) spots available for the Australian team.

On 5 February 2022, India won the 2022 ICC Under-19 Cricket World Cup to win their fifth title. The following day, in their home series against the West Indies, India's senior men's team played their 1,000th ODI match, becoming the first team to play one thousand matches in that format.

== Season overview ==
Men's international tours
Start date	Home team	Away team	Results [Matches]		
Start date	Home team	Away team	Test	ODI	T20I
1 September 2021	Bangladesh	New Zealand	—	—	3–2 [5]
1 September 2021 (Note: The series was postponed due the situation in Afghanistan and the logistics in travelling.)	Pakistan	Afghanistan	—	[3]	—
2 September 2021	Sri Lanka	South Africa	—	2–1 [3]	0–3 [3]
6 September 2021	(Oman) United States	Papua New Guinea	—	2–0 [2]	—
7 September 2021	(Oman) Nepal	Papua New Guinea	—	2–0 [2]	—
17 September 2021 (Note: The series was called off due to security concerns.)	Pakistan	New Zealand	—	[3]	[5]
20 September 2021 (Note: The series was postponed due to fixture congestion.)	Bangladesh	England	—	[3]	[3]
7 October 2021	Oman	Sri Lanka	—	—	0–2 [2] (Note: Originally scheduled to be two T20I matches, they were changed to twenty-over fixtures by the agreement of both cricket boards.)
13 October 2021 (Note: The series was called off due to concerns about travelling to the region.)	Pakistan	England	—	—	[2]
17 November 2021	India	New Zealand	1–0 [2]	—	3–0 [3]
19 November 2021	Bangladesh	Pakistan	0–2 [2]	—	0–3 [3]
21 November 2021	Sri Lanka	West Indies	2–0 [2]	—	—
26 November 2021 (Note: The series was curtailed due to the COVID-19 pandemic.)	South Africa	Netherlands	—	0–0 [3]	—
27 November 2021 (Note: The series was postponed due to Taliban not supporting women's cricket.)	Australia	Afghanistan	[1]	—	—
8 December 2021	Australia	England	4–0 [5]	—	—
13 December 2021	Pakistan	West Indies	—	[3]	3–0 [3]
22 December 2021	United States	Ireland	—	[3]	1–1 [2]
26 December 2021	South Africa	India	2–1 [3]	3–0 [3]	—
1 January 2022	New Zealand	Bangladesh	1–1 [2]	—	—
8 January 2022	West Indies	Ireland	—	1–2 [3]	—
16 January 2022	Sri Lanka	Zimbabwe	—	2–1 [3]	–
21 January 2022	(Qatar) Afghanistan	Netherlands	—	3–0 [3]	—
22 January 2022	West Indies	England	1–0 [3]	—	3–2 [5]
30 January 2022 (Note: The series was called off due to uncertainty about COVID-19 quarantine rules.)	Australia	New Zealand	—	[3]	[1]
5 February 2022	Oman	United Arab Emirates	—	0–2 [3]	—
6 February 2022	India	West Indies	—	3–0 [3]	3–0 [3]
11 February 2022	Australia	Sri Lanka	—	—	4–1 [5]
17 February 2022	New Zealand	South Africa	1–1 [2]	—	—
23 February 2022	Bangladesh	Afghanistan	—	2–1 [3]	1–1 [2]
24 February 2022	India	Sri Lanka	2–0 [2]	—	3–0 [3]
February 2022 (Note: The series was postponed after Zimbabwe Cricket could not secure all the broadcasting services including the Decision Review System.)	Zimbabwe	Afghanistan	—	[3]	[5]
4 March 2022	Pakistan	Australia	0–1 [3]	2–1 [3]	0–1 [1]
17 March 2022	New Zealand	Australia	—	—	[3]
18 March 2022	South Africa	Bangladesh	2–0 [2]	1–2 [3]	—
25 March 2022	New Zealand	Netherlands	—	3–0 [3]	0–0 [1]
25 March 2022	Nepal	Papua New Guinea	—	0–2 [2]	–
Men's international tournaments
Start date	Tournament				Winners
13 September 2021	2021 Oman Tri-Nation Series (round 6)				—N/a
25 September 2021	2021 Oman Tri-Nation Series (round 7)				—N/a
5 October 2021	(United Arab Emirates) 2021 Summer T20 Bash				—N/a
17 October 2021	(United Arab Emirates) (Oman) 2021 ICC Men's T20 World Cup				Australia
26 November 2021	2021 Namibia Tri-Nation Series				—N/a
14 January 2022	(Cricket West Indies) 2022 ICC Under-19 Cricket World Cup				India
5 March 2022	2022 United Arab Emirates Tri-Nation Series (round 9)				—N/a
15 March 2022	2022 United Arab Emirates Tri-Nation Series (round 10)				—N/a
9 April 2022	(United Arab Emirates) 2022 Papua New Guinea Tri-Nation Series (round 11)				—N/a

Women's international tours
Start date	Home team	Away team	Results [Matches]		
Start date	Home team	Away team	WTest	WODI	WT20I
21 September 2021	Australia	India	0–0 [1]	2–1 [3]	2–0 [3]
5 October 2021	Zimbabwe	Ireland	—	1–3 [4]	—
10 October 2021	Pakistan	England	—	[3]	[2]
8 November 2021	Pakistan	West Indies	—	0–3 [3]	—
10 November 2021	Zimbabwe	Bangladesh	—	0–3 [3]	—
20 January 2022	Australia	England	0–0 [1]	3–0 [3]	1–0 [3]
28 January 2022	South Africa	West Indies	—	2–1 [4]	—
9 February 2022	New Zealand	India	—	4–1 [5]	1–0 [1]
Women's international tournaments
Start date	Tournament			Winners	
21 November 2021 (Note: The tournament was curtailed due to the COVID-19 pandemic.)	(Zimbabwe) 2021 Women's Cricket World Cup Qualifier			—N/a	
4 March 2022	(New Zealand) 2022 Women's Cricket World Cup			Australia	

== Rankings ==
The following were the rankings at the beginning of the season.

ICC Men's Test Team Rankings 25 August 2021
Rank	Team	Matches	Points	Rating
1	New Zealand	22	2,764	126
2	India	25	2,987	119
3	Australia	17	1,844	108
4	England	35	3,753	107
5	Pakistan	27	2,481	92
6	South Africa	19	1,675	88
7	West Indies	30	2,396	80
8	Sri Lanka	27	2,095	78
9	Bangladesh	16	779	49
10	Zimbabwe	11	342	31

ICC Men's ODI Team Rankings 25 September 2021
Rank	Team	Matches	Points	Rating
1	New Zealand	17	2,054	121
2	England	32	3,793	119
3	Australia	28	3,244	116
4	India	32	3,624	113
5	South Africa	25	2,459	98
6	Pakistan	27	2,524	93
7	Bangladesh	30	2,740	91
8	West Indies	30	2,523	84
9	Sri Lanka	32	2,657	83
10	Afghanistan	17	1,054	62
11	Netherlands	7	336	48
12	Ireland	25	1,145	46
13	Oman	11	435	40
14	Scotland	8	308	39
15	Zimbabwe	20	764	38
16	Nepal	11	330	30
Only the top 16 teams are shown

ICC Men's T20I Team Rankings 20 September 2021
Rank	Team	Matches	Points	Rating
1	England	28	7,786	278
2	India	28	7,456	266
3	Pakistan	34	8,883	261
4	New Zealand	28	7,192	257
5	South Africa	30	7,489	250
6	Bangladesh	26	6,259	241
7	Australia	33	7,923	240
8	Afghanistan	12	2,826	236
9	West Indies	29	6,792	234
10	Sri Lanka	22	5,048	229
11	Zimbabwe	30	5,751	192
12	Ireland	26	4,930	190
13	Nepal	19	3,556	187
14	United Arab Emirates	11	2,023	184
15	Scotland	14	2,553	182
16	Papua New Guinea	14	2,501	179
Only the top 16 teams are shown

ICC Women's ODI Rankings 27 September 2021
Rank	Team	Matches	Points	Rating
1	Australia	21	3,379	161
2	England	25	2,983	119
3	South Africa	29	3,390	117
4	India	26	2,934	113
5	New Zealand	26	2,392	92
6	West Indies	22	1,872	85
7	Pakistan	20	1,496	75
8	Bangladesh	5	306	61
9	Sri Lanka	11	519	47
10	Ireland	2	25	13

ICC Women's T20I Rankings 25 September 2021
Rank	Team	Matches	Points	Rating
1	Australia	31	8,967	289
2	England	39	11,060	284
3	India	38	10,146	267
4	New Zealand	31	8,275	267
5	South Africa	32	8,048	252
6	West Indies	31	7,468	241
7	Pakistan	30	6,778	226
8	Sri Lanka	18	3,631	202
9	Bangladesh	26	5,001	192
10	Ireland	24	3,948	165
11	Thailand	29	4,667	161
12	Zimbabwe	21	3,287	157
13	Scotland	18	2,754	153
14	Nepal	11	1,457	132
15	Papua New Guinea	11	1,423	129
16	Samoa	6	749	125
Only the top 16 teams are shown

=== On-going tournaments ===
The following were the rankings at the beginning of the season.

2021–2023 ICC World Test Championship
Rank	Team	Series	PCT
1	India	1*	54.17%
2	Pakistan	1	50.00%
3	West Indies	1	50.00%
4	England	1*	29.17%
Full Table

2020–2023 ICC Cricket World Cup Super League
Rank	Team	Matches	Points
1	England	15	95
2	Bangladesh	12	80
3	Australia	9	60
4	Ireland	15	50
5	India	9	49
6	Sri Lanka	15	42
7	Pakistan	9	40
8	West Indies	9	40
9	South Africa	9	34
10	New Zealand	3	30
11	Afghanistan	3	30
12	Zimbabwe	9	25
13	Netherlands	3	20
Full Table

2019–2023 ICC Cricket World Cup League 2
Rank	Team	Matches	Points
1	Oman	10	16
2	United States	12	12
3	Scotland	8	9
4	Namibia	7	8
5	United Arab Emirates	7	7
6	Nepal	4	4
7	Papua New Guinea	8	0
Full Table

2019–22 ICC Cricket World Cup Challenge League
League A
Rank	Team	Matches	Points
1	Canada	5	8
2	Singapore	5	8
3	Qatar	5	6
4	Denmark	5	4
5	Malaysia	5	2
6	Vanuatu	5	2
Full Table

2019–22 ICC Cricket World Cup Challenge League
League B
Rank	Team	Matches	Points
1	Uganda	5	10
2	Hong Kong	5	7
3	Italy	5	5
4	Jersey	5	4
5	Kenya	5	3
6	Bermuda	5	1
Full Table

== September ==
=== New Zealand in Bangladesh ===
T20I series
No.	Date	Home captain	Away captain	Venue	Result
T20I 1243	1 September	Mahmudullah	Tom Latham	Sher-e-Bangla National Cricket Stadium, Dhaka	Bangladesh by 7 wickets
T20I 1251	3 September	Mahmudullah	Tom Latham	Sher-e-Bangla National Cricket Stadium, Dhaka	Bangladesh by 4 runs
T20I 1259	5 September	Mahmudullah	Tom Latham	Sher-e-Bangla National Cricket Stadium, Dhaka	New Zealand by 52 runs
T20I 1260	8 September	Mahmudullah	Tom Latham	Sher-e-Bangla National Cricket Stadium, Dhaka	Bangladesh by 6 wickets
T20I 1263	10 September	Mahmudullah	Tom Latham	Sher-e-Bangla National Cricket Stadium, Dhaka	New Zealand by 27 runs

=== Afghanistan in Pakistan ===
The tour was postponed due to the situation in Afghanistan, the logistics in travelling, and for the welfare of the team.

2020–2023 ICC Cricket World Cup Super League – ODI series
No.	Date	Home captain	Away captain	Venue	Result
[1st ODI]	1 September		Hashmatullah Shahidi		
[2nd ODI]	3 September		Hashmatullah Shahidi		
[3rd ODI]	5 September		Hashmatullah Shahidi		

=== South Africa in Sri Lanka ===
2020–2023 ICC Cricket World Cup Super League – ODI series
No.	Date	Home captain	Away captain	Venue	Result
ODI 4314	2 September	Dasun Shanaka	Temba Bavuma	R. Premadasa Stadium, Colombo	Sri Lanka by 14 runs
ODI 4315	4 September	Dasun Shanaka	Keshav Maharaj	R. Premadasa Stadium, Colombo	South Africa by 67 runs (DLS)
ODI 4318	7 September	Dasun Shanaka	Keshav Maharaj	R. Premadasa Stadium, Colombo	Sri Lanka by 78 runs
T20I series
No.	Date	Home captain	Away captain	Venue	Result
T20I 1265	10 September	Dasun Shanaka	Keshav Maharaj	R. Premadasa Stadium, Colombo	South Africa by 28 runs
T20I 1270	12 September	Dasun Shanaka	Keshav Maharaj	R. Premadasa Stadium, Colombo	South Africa by 9 wickets
T20I 1273	14 September	Dasun Shanaka	Keshav Maharaj	R. Premadasa Stadium, Colombo	South Africa by 10 wickets

=== Papua New Guinea vs United States in Oman ===
ODI series
No.	Date	Home captain	Away captain	Venue	Result
ODI 4316	6 September	Saurabh Netravalkar	Assad Vala	Oman Cricket Academy Ground Turf 2, Muscat	United States by 7 wickets
ODI 4320	9 September	Saurabh Netravalkar	Assad Vala	Oman Cricket Academy Ground Turf 1, Muscat	United States by 134 runs

=== Papua New Guinea vs Nepal in Oman ===
ODI series
No.	Date	Home captain	Away captain	Venue	Result
ODI 4317	7 September	Gyanendra Malla	Assad Vala	Oman Cricket Academy Ground Turf 2, Muscat	Nepal by 2 wickets
ODI 4322	10 September	Gyanendra Malla	Assad Vala	Oman Cricket Academy Ground Turf 1, Muscat	Nepal by 151 runs

=== 2021 Oman Tri-Nation Series (round 6) ===
2019–2023 ICC Cricket World Cup League 2 – Tri-series
No.	Date	Team 1	Captain 1	Team 2	Captain 2	Venue	Result
ODI 4324	13 September	Nepal	Gyanendra Malla	United States	Saurabh Netravalkar	Oman Cricket Academy Ground Turf 1, Muscat	Nepal by 5 wickets
ODI 4325	14 September	Oman	Zeeshan Maqsood	Nepal	Gyanendra Malla	Oman Cricket Academy Ground Turf 1, Muscat	Oman by 5 wickets
ODI 4326	16 September	Oman	Zeeshan Maqsood	United States	Saurabh Netravalkar	Oman Cricket Academy Ground Turf 1, Muscat	Oman by 4 wickets
ODI 4327	17 September	Nepal	Gyanendra Malla	United States	Saurabh Netravalkar	Oman Cricket Academy Ground Turf 1, Muscat	United States by 6 wickets
ODI 4328	19 September	Oman	Zeeshan Maqsood	Nepal	Gyanendra Malla	Oman Cricket Academy Ground Turf 1, Muscat	Nepal by 7 wickets
ODI 4329	20 September	Oman	Zeeshan Maqsood	United States	Saurabh Netravalkar	Oman Cricket Academy Ground Turf 1, Muscat	Oman by 72 runs

=== New Zealand in Pakistan ===
The tour was called off ahead of the first ODI due to security concerns.

ODI series
No.	Date	Home captain	Away captain	Venue	Result
ODI 4326a	17 September	Babar Azam	Tom Latham	Rawalpindi Cricket Stadium, Rawalpindi	
2nd ODI	19 September	Babar Azam	Tom Latham	Rawalpindi Cricket Stadium, Rawalpindi	
3rd ODI	21 September	Babar Azam	Tom Latham	Rawalpindi Cricket Stadium, Rawalpindi	
T20I series
No.	Date	Home captain	Away captain	Venue	Result
1st T20I	25 September	Babar Azam	Tom Latham	Gaddafi Stadium, Lahore	
2nd T20I	26 September	Babar Azam	Tom Latham	Gaddafi Stadium, Lahore	
3rd T20I	29 September	Babar Azam	Tom Latham	Gaddafi Stadium, Lahore	
4th T20I	1 October	Babar Azam	Tom Latham	Gaddafi Stadium, Lahore	
5th T20I	3 October	Babar Azam	Tom Latham	Gaddafi Stadium, Lahore	

=== India women in Australia ===
WODI series
No.	Date	Home captain	Away captain	Venue	Result
WODI 1213	21 September	Meg Lanning	Mithali Raj	Great Barrier Reef Arena, Mackay	Australia by 9 wickets
WODI 1216	24 September	Meg Lanning	Mithali Raj	Great Barrier Reef Arena, Mackay	Australia by 5 wickets
WODI 1217	26 September	Meg Lanning	Mithali Raj	Great Barrier Reef Arena, Mackay	India by 2 wickets
Only WTest
No.	Date	Home captain	Away captain	Venue	Result
WTest 142	30 September – 3 October	Meg Lanning	Mithali Raj	Carrara Stadium, Gold Coast	Match drawn
WT20I series
No.	Date	Home captain	Away captain	Venue	Result
WT20I 981	7 October	Meg Lanning	Harmanpreet Kaur	Carrara Stadium, Gold Coast	No result
WT20I 982	9 October	Meg Lanning	Harmanpreet Kaur	Carrara Stadium, Gold Coast	Australia by 4 wickets
WT20I 983	10 October	Meg Lanning	Harmanpreet Kaur	Carrara Stadium, Gold Coast	Australia by 14 runs

=== 2021 Oman Tri-Nation Series (round 7) ===
2019–2023 ICC Cricket World Cup League 2 – Tri-series
No.	Date	Team 1	Captain 1	Team 2	Captain 2	Venue	Result
ODI 4330	25 September	Papua New Guinea	Assad Vala	Scotland	Kyle Coetzer	Oman Cricket Academy Ground Turf 2, Muscat	Scotland by 6 wickets
ODI 4331	26 September	Oman	Zeeshan Maqsood	Papua New Guinea	Assad Vala	Oman Cricket Academy Ground Turf 2, Muscat	Oman by 110 runs
ODI 4332	28 September	Oman	Zeeshan Maqsood	Scotland	Kyle Coetzer	Oman Cricket Academy Ground Turf 2, Muscat	Scotland by 18 runs
ODI 4333	29 September	Papua New Guinea	Assad Vala	Scotland	Kyle Coetzer	Oman Cricket Academy Ground Turf 1, Muscat	Scotland by 4 wickets
ODI 4334	1 October	Oman	Zeeshan Maqsood	Papua New Guinea	Assad Vala	Oman Cricket Academy Ground Turf 1, Muscat	Oman by 3 wickets
ODI 4335	2 October	Oman	Zeeshan Maqsood	Scotland	Kyle Coetzer	Oman Cricket Academy Ground Turf 1, Muscat	No result

=== England in Bangladesh ===
In August 2021, the tour was postponed due to fixture congestion and the ongoing Covid pandemic, with the series rescheduled for March 2023.

T20I series
No.	Date	Home captain	Away captain	Venue	Result
[1st T20I]					
[2nd T20I]					
[3rd T20I]					
2020–2023 ICC Cricket World Cup Super League – ODI series
No.	Date	Home captain	Away captain	Venue	Result
[1st ODI]					
[2nd ODI]					
[3rd ODI]					

== October ==
=== 2021 Summer T20 Bash ===
T20I series
No.	Date	Team 1	Captain 1	Team 2	Captain 2	Venue	Result
T20I 1281	5 October	United Arab Emirates	Ahmed Raza	Namibia	Gerhard Erasmus	ICC Academy Ground, Dubai	Namibia by 17 runs
T20I 1286	7 October	United Arab Emirates	Ahmed Raza	Ireland	Andrew Balbirnie	ICC Academy Ground, Dubai	Ireland by 7 wickets
T20I 1289	8 October	United Arab Emirates	Ahmed Raza	Ireland	Andrew Balbirnie	ICC Academy Ground, Dubai	United Arab Emirates by 54 runs
T20I 1291	8 October	Papua New Guinea	Assad Vala	Scotland	Kyle Coetzer	ICC Academy Ground, Dubai	Scotland by 8 wickets
T20I 1293	9 October	Namibia	Gerhard Erasmus	Scotland	Kyle Coetzer	ICC Academy Ground, Dubai	Namibia by 5 wickets
T20I 1294	10 October	United Arab Emirates	Ahmed Raza	Ireland	Andrew Balbirnie	ICC Academy Ground, Dubai	United Arab Emirates by 7 wickets
T20I 1295	10 October	Namibia	Gerhard Erasmus	Papua New Guinea	Assad Vala	ICC Academy Ground, Dubai	Namibia by 14 runs

=== Ireland women in Zimbabwe ===
WODI series
No.	Date	Home captain	Away captain	Venue	Result
WODI 1219	5 October	Mary-Anne Musonda	Laura Delany	Harare Sports Club, Harare	Zimbabwe by 4 wickets
WODI 1220	7 October	Mary-Anne Musonda	Laura Delany	Harare Sports Club, Harare	Ireland by 80 runs
WODI 1221	9 October	Mary-Anne Musonda	Laura Delany	Harare Sports Club, Harare	Ireland by 8 wickets
WODI 1222	11 October	Mary-Anne Musonda	Laura Delany	Harare Sports Club, Harare	Ireland by 85 runs

=== Sri Lanka in Oman ===
Twenty-over series
No.	Date	Home captain	Away captain	Venue	Result
1st match	7 October	Zeeshan Maqsood	Dasun Shanaka	Oman Cricket Academy Ground Turf 1, Muscat	Sri Lanka by 19 runs
2nd match	9 October	Zeeshan Maqsood	Dasun Shanaka	Oman Cricket Academy Ground Turf 1, Muscat	Sri Lanka by 5 wickets

=== England women in Pakistan ===
The tour was cancelled due to concerns of travelling to the region.

WT20I series
No.	Date	Home captain	Away captain	Venue	Result
1st WT20I	10 October			Rawalpindi Cricket Stadium, Rawalpindi	
2nd WT20I	October			Rawalpindi Cricket Stadium, Rawalpindi	
WODI series
No.	Date	Home captain	Away captain	Venue	Result
1st WODI	October			Rawalpindi Cricket Stadium, Rawalpindi	
2nd WODI	October			Rawalpindi Cricket Stadium, Rawalpindi	
3rd WODI	22 October			Rawalpindi Cricket Stadium, Rawalpindi	

=== England in Pakistan ===
The tour was cancelled due to concerns of travelling to the region.

T20I series
No.	Date	Home captain	Away captain	Venue	Result
1st T20I	13 October	Babar Azam		Rawalpindi Cricket Stadium, Rawalpindi	
2nd T20I	14 October	Babar Azam		Rawalpindi Cricket Stadium, Rawalpindi	

=== 2021 ICC Men's T20 World Cup ===
Pos	Team	Pld	W	L	NR	Pts	NRR	Qualification
1	Sri Lanka	3	3	0	0	6	3.754	Advanced to Super 12
2	Namibia	3	2	1	0	4	−0.523	Advanced to Super 12
3	Ireland	3	1	2	0	2	−0.853	
4	Netherlands	3	0	3	0	0	−2.460	

Source: CricketArchive

Pos	Team	Pld	W	L	NR	Pts	NRR	Qualification
1	Scotland	3	3	0	0	6	0.775	Advanced to Super 12
2	Bangladesh	3	2	1	0	4	1.733	Advanced to Super 12
3	Oman	3	1	2	0	2	−0.025	
4	Papua New Guinea	3	0	3	0	0	−2.655	

Source: CricketArchive

Group stage
No.	Date	Team 1	Captain 1	Team 2	Captain 2	Venue	Result
T20I 1307	17 October	Oman	Zeeshan Maqsood	Papua New Guinea	Assad Vala	Oman Cricket Academy Ground Turf 1, Muscat	Oman by 10 wickets
T20I 1311	17 October	Bangladesh	Mahmudullah	Scotland	Kyle Coetzer	Oman Cricket Academy Ground Turf 1, Muscat	Scotland by 6 runs
T20I 1312	18 October	Ireland	Andrew Balbirnie	Netherlands	Pieter Seelaar	Sheikh Zayed Cricket Stadium, Abu Dhabi	Ireland by 7 wickets
T20I 1313	18 October	Sri Lanka	Dasun Shanaka	Namibia	Gerhard Erasmus	Sheikh Zayed Cricket Stadium, Abu Dhabi	Sri Lanka by 7 wickets
T20I 1318	19 October	Scotland	Kyle Coetzer	Papua New Guinea	Assad Vala	Oman Cricket Academy Ground Turf 1, Muscat	Scotland by 17 runs
T20I 1322	19 October	Oman	Zeeshan Maqsood	Bangladesh	Mahmudullah	Oman Cricket Academy Ground Turf 1, Muscat	Bangladesh by 26 runs
T20I 1327	20 October	Namibia	Gerhard Erasmus	Netherlands	Pieter Seelaar	Sheikh Zayed Cricket Stadium, Abu Dhabi	Namibia by 6 wickets
T20I 1331	20 October	Sri Lanka	Dasun Shanaka	Ireland	Andrew Balbirnie	Sheikh Zayed Cricket Stadium, Abu Dhabi	Sri Lanka by 70 runs
T20I 1334	21 October	Bangladesh	Mahmudullah	Papua New Guinea	Assad Vala	Oman Cricket Academy Ground Turf 1, Muscat	Bangladesh by 84 runs
T20I 1338	21 October	Oman	Zeeshan Maqsood	Scotland	Kyle Coetzer	Oman Cricket Academy Ground Turf 1, Muscat	Scotland by 8 wickets
T20I 1342	22 October	Namibia	Gerhard Erasmus	Ireland	Andrew Balbirnie	Sharjah Cricket Stadium, Sharjah	Namibia by 8 wickets
T20I 1346	22 October	Sri Lanka	Dasun Shanaka	Netherlands	Pieter Seelaar	Sharjah Cricket Stadium, Sharjah	Sri Lanka by 8 wickets

==== Super 12 ====
Pos	Team	Pld	W	L	NR	Pts	NRR	Qualification
1	England	5	4	1	0	8	2.464	Advanced to knockout stage
2	Australia	5	4	1	0	8	1.216	Advanced to knockout stage
3	South Africa	5	4	1	0	8	0.739	
4	Sri Lanka	5	2	3	0	4	−0.269	
5	West Indies	5	1	4	0	2	−1.641	
6	Bangladesh	5	0	5	0	0	−2.383	

Source: ESPN Cricinfo

Pos	Team	Pld	W	L	NR	Pts	NRR	Qualification
1	Pakistan	5	5	0	0	10	1.583	Advanced to knockout stage
2	New Zealand	5	4	1	0	8	1.162	Advanced to knockout stage
3	India	5	3	2	0	6	1.747	
4	Afghanistan	5	2	3	0	4	1.053	
5	Namibia	5	1	4	0	2	−1.890	
6	Scotland	5	0	5	0	0	−3.543	

Source: ESPN Cricinfo

Super 12
No.	Date	Team 1	Captain 1	Team 2	Captain 2	Venue	Result
T20I 1351	23 October	Australia	Aaron Finch	South Africa	Temba Bavuma	Sheikh Zayed Cricket Stadium, Abu Dhabi	Australia by 5 wickets
T20I 1354	23 October	England	Eoin Morgan	West Indies	Kieron Pollard	Dubai International Cricket Stadium, Dubai	England by 6 wickets
T20I 1357	24 October	Sri Lanka	Dasun Shanaka	Bangladesh	Mahmudullah	Sharjah Cricket Stadium, Sharjah	Sri Lanka by 5 wickets
T20I 1361	24 October	India	Virat Kohli	Pakistan	Babar Azam	Dubai International Cricket Stadium, Dubai	Pakistan by 10 wickets
T20I 1364	25 October	Afghanistan	Mohammad Nabi	Scotland	Kyle Coetzer	Sharjah Cricket Stadium, Sharjah	Afghanistan by 130 runs
T20I 1366	26 October	South Africa	Temba Bavuma	West Indies	Kieron Pollard	Dubai International Cricket Stadium, Dubai	South Africa by 8 wickets
T20I 1367	26 October	Pakistan	Babar Azam	New Zealand	Kane Williamson	Sharjah Cricket Stadium, Sharjah	Pakistan by 5 wickets
T20I 1369	27 October	England	Eoin Morgan	Bangladesh	Mahmudullah	Sheikh Zayed Cricket Stadium, Abu Dhabi	England by 8 wickets
T20I 1371	27 October	Scotland	Richie Berrington	Namibia	Gerhard Erasmus	Sheikh Zayed Cricket Stadium, Abu Dhabi	Namibia by 4 wickets
T20I 1374	28 October	Australia	Aaron Finch	Sri Lanka	Dasun Shanaka	Dubai International Cricket Stadium, Dubai	Australia by 7 wickets
T20I 1375	29 October	West Indies	Kieron Pollard	Bangladesh	Mahmudullah	Sharjah Cricket Stadium, Sharjah	West Indies by 3 runs
T20I 1377	29 October	Afghanistan	Mohammad Nabi	Pakistan	Babar Azam	Dubai International Cricket Stadium, Dubai	Pakistan by 5 wickets
T20I 1378	30 October	South Africa	Temba Bavuma	Sri Lanka	Dasun Shanaka	Sharjah Cricket Stadium, Sharjah	South Africa by 4 wickets
T20I 1379	30 October	Australia	Aaron Finch	England	Eoin Morgan	Dubai International Cricket Stadium, Dubai	England by 8 wickets
T20I 1380	31 October	Afghanistan	Mohammad Nabi	Namibia	Gerhard Erasmus	Sheikh Zayed Cricket Stadium, Abu Dhabi	Afghanistan by 62 runs
T20I 1381	31 October	India	Virat Kohli	New Zealand	Kane Williamson	Dubai International Cricket Stadium, Dubai	New Zealand by 8 wickets
T20I 1382	1 November	England	Eoin Morgan	Sri Lanka	Dasun Shanaka	Sharjah Cricket Stadium, Sharjah	England by 26 runs
T20I 1384	2 November	South Africa	Temba Bavuma	Bangladesh	Mahmudullah	Sheikh Zayed Cricket Stadium, Abu Dhabi	South Africa by 6 wickets
T20I 1386	2 November	Pakistan	Babar Azam	Namibia	Gerhard Erasmus	Sheikh Zayed Cricket Stadium, Abu Dhabi	Pakistan by 45 runs
T20I 1388	3 November	New Zealand	Kane Williamson	Scotland	Kyle Coetzer	Dubai International Cricket Stadium, Dubai	New Zealand by 16 runs
T20I 1390	3 November	India	Virat Kohli	Afghanistan	Mohammad Nabi	Sheikh Zayed Cricket Stadium, Abu Dhabi	India by 66 runs
T20I 1391	4 November	Australia	Aaron Finch	Bangladesh	Mahmudullah	Dubai International Cricket Stadium, Dubai	Australia by 8 wickets
T20I 1392	4 November	West Indies	Kieron Pollard	Sri Lanka	Dasun Shanaka	Sheikh Zayed Cricket Stadium, Abu Dhabi	Sri Lanka by 20 runs
T20I 1394	5 November	New Zealand	Kane Williamson	Namibia	Gerhard Erasmus	Sharjah Cricket Stadium, Sharjah	New Zealand by 52 runs
T20I 1396	5 November	India	Virat Kohli	Scotland	Kyle Coetzer	Dubai International Cricket Stadium, Dubai	India by 8 wickets
T20I 1398	6 November	Australia	Aaron Finch	West Indies	Kieron Pollard	Sheikh Zayed Cricket Stadium, Abu Dhabi	Australia by 8 wickets
T20I 1400	6 November	England	Eoin Morgan	South Africa	Temba Bavuma	Sharjah Cricket Stadium, Sharjah	South Africa by 10 runs
T20I 1402	7 November	Afghanistan	Mohammad Nabi	New Zealand	Kane Williamson	Sheikh Zayed Cricket Stadium, Abu Dhabi	New Zealand by 8 wickets
T20I 1406	7 November	Pakistan	Babar Azam	Scotland	Kyle Coetzer	Sharjah Cricket Stadium, Sharjah	Pakistan by 72 runs
T20I 1410	8 November	India	Virat Kohli	Namibia	Gerhard Erasmus	Dubai International Cricket Stadium, Dubai	India by 9 wickets

==== Finals ====
Semi-Finals
No.	Date	Team 1	Captain 1	Team 2	Captain 2	Venue	Result
T20I 1415	10 November	England	Eoin Morgan	New Zealand	Kane Williamson	Sheikh Zayed Cricket Stadium, Abu Dhabi	New Zealand by 5 wickets
T20I 1420	11 November	Pakistan	Babar Azam	Australia	Aaron Finch	Dubai International Cricket Stadium, Dubai	Australia by 5 wickets
Final
T20I 1428	14 November	New Zealand	Kane Williamson	Australia	Aaron Finch	Dubai International Cricket Stadium, Dubai	Australia by 8 wickets

== November ==
=== West Indies women in Pakistan ===
WODI series
No.	Date	Home captain	Away captain	Venue	Result
WODI 1223	8 November	Sidra Nawaz	Stafanie Taylor	National Stadium, Karachi	West Indies by 45 runs
WODI 1225	11 November	Javeria Khan	Stafanie Taylor	National Stadium, Karachi	West Indies by 37 runs
WODI 1227	14 November	Javeria Khan	Stafanie Taylor	National Stadium, Karachi	West Indies by 6 wickets

=== Bangladesh women in Zimbabwe ===
WODI series
No.	Date	Home captain	Away captain	Venue	Result
WODI 1224	10 November	Mary-Anne Musonda	Fahima Khatun	Queens Sports Club, Bulawayo	Bangladesh by 8 wickets
WODI 1226	13 November	Mary-Anne Musonda	Fahima Khatun	Queens Sports Club, Bulawayo	Bangladesh by 9 wickets
WODI 1228	15 November	Mary-Anne Musonda	Nigar Sultana	Queens Sports Club, Bulawayo	Bangladesh by 7 wickets

=== New Zealand in India ===
T20I series
No.	Date	Home captain	Away captain	Venue	Result
T20I 1434	17 November	Rohit Sharma	Tim Southee	Sawai Mansingh Stadium, Jaipur	India by 5 wickets
T20I 1440	19 November	Rohit Sharma	Tim Southee	JSCA International Stadium Complex, Ranchi	India by 7 wickets
T20I 1446	21 November	Rohit Sharma	Mitchell Santner	Eden Gardens, Kolkata	India by 73 runs
2021–2023 ICC World Test Championship – Test series
No.	Date	Home captain	Away captain	Venue	Result
Test 2435	25–29 November	Ajinkya Rahane	Kane Williamson	Green Park Stadium, Kanpur	Match drawn
Test 2438	3–7 December	Virat Kohli	Tom Latham	Wankhede Stadium, Mumbai	India by 372 runs

=== Pakistan in Bangladesh ===
T20I series
No.	Date	Home captain	Away captain	Venue	Result
T20I 1439	19 November	Mahmudullah	Babar Azam	Sher-e-Bangla National Cricket Stadium, Dhaka	Pakistan by 4 wickets
T20I 1443	20 November	Mahmudullah	Babar Azam	Sher-e-Bangla National Cricket Stadium, Dhaka	Pakistan by 8 wickets
T20I 1447	22 November	Mahmudullah	Babar Azam	Sher-e-Bangla National Cricket Stadium, Dhaka	Pakistan by 5 wickets
2021–2023 ICC World Test Championship – Test series
No.	Date	Home captain	Away captain	Venue	Result
Test 2436	26–30 November	Mominul Haque	Babar Azam	Zohur Ahmed Chowdhury Stadium, Chittagong	Pakistan by 8 wickets
Test 2439	4–8 December	Mominul Haque	Babar Azam	Sher-e-Bangla National Cricket Stadium, Dhaka	Pakistan by an innings and 8 runs

=== West Indies in Sri Lanka ===
Sobers–Tissera Trophy, 2021–2023 ICC World Test Championship – Test series
No.	Date	Home captain	Away captain	Venue	Result
Test 2434	21–25 November	Dimuth Karunaratne	Kraigg Brathwaite	Galle International Stadium, Galle	Sri Lanka by 187 runs
Test 2437	29 November – 3 December	Dimuth Karunaratne	Kraigg Brathwaite	Galle International Stadium, Galle	Sri Lanka by 164 runs

=== 2021 Women's Cricket World Cup Qualifier ===
The tournament was called-off midway through due to the COVID-19 pandemic.

Pos	Team	Pld	W	L	NR	Pts	NRR
1	West Indies	1	1	0	0	2	0.947
2	Sri Lanka	1	1	0	0	2	0.779
3	Ireland	2	1	1	0	2	−0.141
4	Netherlands	2	0	2	0	0	−0.673

Source: Cricinfo

Pos	Team	Pld	W	L	NR	Pts	NRR
1	Thailand	4	3	1	0	6	0.488
2	Bangladesh	3	2	1	0	4	1.841
3	Pakistan	3	2	1	0	4	1.094
4	Zimbabwe (H)	3	1	2	0	2	−0.434
5	United States	3	0	3	0	0	−3.613

Source: Cricinfo
(H) Host

Group stage
No.	Date	Team 1	Captain 1	Team 2	Captain 2	Venue	Result
WODI 1229	21 November	Bangladesh	Nigar Sultana	Pakistan	Javeria Khan	Old Hararians, Harare	Bangladesh by 3 wickets
2nd Match	21 November	Zimbabwe	Mary-Anne Musonda	Thailand	Naruemol Chaiwai	Harare Sports Club, Harare	Thailand by 8 runs
WODI 1230	23 November	Ireland	Laura Delany	West Indies	Stafanie Taylor	Old Hararians, Harare	West Indies by 6 wickets
4th Match	23 November	Netherlands	Heather Siegers	Sri Lanka	Chamari Athapaththu	Harare Sports Club, Harare	Sri Lanka by 34 runs (DLS)
5th Match	23 November	Bangladesh	Nigar Sultana	United States	Sindhu Sriharsha	Sunrise Sports Club, Harare	Bangladesh by 270 runs
6th Match	23 November	Pakistan	Javeria Khan	Thailand	Naruemol Chaiwai	Takashinga Cricket Club, Harare	Pakistan by 52 runs
7th Match	25 November	Bangladesh	Nigar Sultana	Thailand	Naruemol Chaiwai	Harare Sports Club, Harare	Thailand by 16 runs (DLS)
8th Match	25 November	Ireland	Laura Delany	Netherlands	Heather Siegers	Sunrise Sports Club, Harare	Ireland by 29 runs
9th Match	25 November	Zimbabwe	Mary-Anne Musonda	United States	Sindhu Sriharsha	Takashinga Cricket Club, Harare	Zimbabwe by 1 wicket
10th Match	27 November	Thailand	Naruemol Chaiwai	United States	Sindhu Sriharsha	Old Hararians, Harare	Thailand by 9 wickets
WODI 1230a	27 November	Sri Lanka	Chamari Athapaththu	West Indies	Stafanie Taylor	Harare Sports Club, Harare	Match cancelled
WODI 1231	27 November	Zimbabwe	Mary-Anne Musonda	Pakistan	Javeria Khan	Sunrise Sports Club, Harare	Pakistan by 114 runs
WODI 1231a	29 November	Ireland	Laura Delany	Sri Lanka	Chamari Athapaththu	Sunrise Sports Club, Harare	
WODI 1231b	29 November	Zimbabwe	Mary-Anne Musonda	Bangladesh	Nigar Sultana	Old Hararians, Harare	
15th Match	29 November	Pakistan	Javeria Khan	United States	Sindhu Sriharsha	Harare Sports Club, Harare	
16th Match	29 November	Netherlands	Heather Siegers	West Indies	Stafanie Taylor	Old Hararians, Harare	

==== Super Six ====
Super Six stage
No.	Date	Team 1	Captain 1	Team 2	Captain 2	Venue	Result
17th Match	1 December					Old Hararians, Harare	
18th Match	1 December					Harare Sports Club, Harare	
19th Match	1 December					Sunrise Sports Club, Harare	
20th Match	3 December					Old Hararians, Harare	
21st Match	3 December					Harare Sports Club, Harare	
22nd Match	3 December					Sunrise Sports Club, Harare	
23rd Match	5 December					Old Hararians, Harare	
24th Match	5 December					Harare Sports Club, Harare	
25th Match	5 December					Sunrise Sports Club, Harare	

=== 2021 Namibia Tri-Nation Series ===
The series was called off after the first two matches due to the COVID-19 pandemic.

2019–2023 ICC Cricket World Cup League 2 – Tri-series
No.	Date	Team 1	Captain 1	Team 2	Captain 2	Venue	Result
ODI 4336	26 November	Namibia	JJ Smit	Oman	Zeeshan Maqsood	Wanderers Cricket Ground, Windhoek	Namibia by 40 runs
ODI 4338	27 November	Namibia	JJ Smit	Oman	Zeeshan Maqsood	Wanderers Cricket Ground, Windhoek	Oman by 9 runs
3rd ODI	29 November	Oman	Zeeshan Maqsood	United Arab Emirates	Ahmed Raza	Wanderers Cricket Ground, Windhoek	
4th ODI	30 November	Namibia	JJ Smit	United Arab Emirates	Ahmed Raza	Wanderers Cricket Ground, Windhoek	
5th ODI	2 December	Oman	Zeeshan Maqsood	United Arab Emirates	Ahmed Raza	Wanderers Cricket Ground, Windhoek	
6th ODI	4 December	Namibia	JJ Smit	Oman	Zeeshan Maqsood	Wanderers Cricket Ground, Windhoek	
7th ODI	5 December	Namibia	JJ Smit	United Arab Emirates	Ahmed Raza	Wanderers Cricket Ground, Windhoek	
8th ODI	6 December	Oman	Zeeshan Maqsood	United Arab Emirates	Ahmed Raza	Wanderers Cricket Ground, Windhoek	

=== Netherlands in South Africa ===
The second and third ODIs were postponed due to the COVID-19 pandemic.

2020–2023 ICC Cricket World Cup Super League – ODI series
No.	Date	Home captain	Away captain	Venue	Result
ODI 4337	26 November	Keshav Maharaj	Pieter Seelaar	Centurion Park, Centurion	No result
2nd ODI	28 November	Keshav Maharaj	Pieter Seelaar	Centurion Park, Centurion	
3rd ODI	1 December	Keshav Maharaj	Pieter Seelaar	Centurion Park, Centurion	

=== Afghanistan in Australia ===
In September 2021, Cricket Tasmania confirmed that the match would not be taking place following the Taliban offensive in Afghanistan, due to the Taliban not supporting women's cricket.

Only Test
No.	Date	Home captain	Away captain	Venue	Result
Only Test	27 November–1 December			Bellerive Oval, Hobart	

== December ==
=== England in Australia ===
The Ashes, 2021–2023 ICC World Test Championship – Test series
No.	Date	Home captain	Away captain	Venue	Result
Test 2440	8–12 December	Pat Cummins	Joe Root	The Gabba, Brisbane	Australia by 9 wickets
Test 2441	16–20 December	Steve Smith	Joe Root	Adelaide Oval, Adelaide	Australia by 275 runs
Test 2442	26–30 December	Pat Cummins	Joe Root	Melbourne Cricket Ground, Melbourne	Australia by an innings and 14 runs
Test 2446	5–9 January	Pat Cummins	Joe Root	Sydney Cricket Ground, Sydney	Match drawn
Test 2449	14–18 January	Pat Cummins	Joe Root	Bellerive Oval, Hobart	Australia by 146 runs

=== West Indies in Pakistan ===
The ODI matches were postponed following multiple cases of COVID-19 the West Indies team and support staff.

T20I series
No.	Date	Home captain	Away captain	Venue	Result
T20I 1448	13 December	Babar Azam	Nicholas Pooran	National Stadium, Karachi	Pakistan by 63 runs
T20I 1449	14 December	Babar Azam	Nicholas Pooran	National Stadium, Karachi	Pakistan by 9 runs
T20I 1450	16 December	Babar Azam	Nicholas Pooran	National Stadium, Karachi	Pakistan by 7 wickets
2020–2023 ICC Cricket World Cup Super League – ODI series
No.	Date	Home captain	Away captain	Venue	Result
1st ODI	18 December	Babar Azam	Shai Hope	National Stadium, Karachi	
2nd ODI	20 December	Babar Azam	Shai Hope	National Stadium, Karachi	
3rd ODI	22 December	Babar Azam	Shai Hope	National Stadium, Karachi	

=== Ireland in United States ===
On 28 December 2021, the ODI matches were cancelled after a number of positive COVID-19 cases from both teams.

T20I series
No.	Date	Home captain	Away captain	Venue	Result
T20I 1451	22 December	Monank Patel	Andrew Balbirnie	Central Broward Park, Lauderhill	United States by 26 runs
T20I 1452	23 December	Monank Patel	Andrew Balbirnie	Central Broward Park, Lauderhill	Ireland by 9 runs
ODI series
No.	Date	Home captain	Away captain	Venue	Result
1st ODI	26 December	Monank Patel	Andrew Balbirnie	Central Broward Park, Lauderhill	
2nd ODI	28 December	Monank Patel	Andrew Balbirnie	Central Broward Park, Lauderhill	
3rd ODI	30 December	Monank Patel	Andrew Balbirnie	Central Broward Park, Lauderhill	

=== India in South Africa ===
Freedom Trophy, 2021–2023 ICC World Test Championship – Test series
No.	Date	Home captain	Away captain	Venue	Result
Test 2443	26–30 December	Dean Elgar	Virat Kohli	Centurion Park, Centurion	India by 113 runs
Test 2445	3–7 January	Dean Elgar	KL Rahul	Wanderers Stadium, Johannesburg	South Africa by 7 wickets
Test 2448	11–15 January	Dean Elgar	Virat Kohli	Newlands Cricket Ground, Cape Town	South Africa by 7 wickets
ODI series
No.	Date	Home captain	Away captain	Venue	Result
ODI 4344	19 January	Temba Bavuma	KL Rahul	Boland Park, Paarl	South Africa by 31 runs
ODI 4346	21 January	Temba Bavuma	KL Rahul	Boland Park, Paarl	South Africa by 7 wickets
ODI 4349	23 January	Temba Bavuma	KL Rahul	Newlands Cricket Ground, Cape Town	South Africa by 4 runs

== January ==
=== Bangladesh in New Zealand ===
2021–2023 ICC World Test Championship – Test series
No.	Date	Home captain	Away captain	Venue	Result
Test 2444	1–5 January	Tom Latham	Mominul Haque	Bay Oval, Tauranga	Bangladesh by 8 wickets
Test 2447	9–13 January	Tom Latham	Mominul Haque	Hagley Oval, Christchurch	New Zealand by Innings and 117 runs

=== Ireland in West Indies ===
2020–2023 ICC Cricket World Cup Super League – ODI series
No.	Date	Home captain	Away captain	Venue	Result
ODI 4339	8 January	Kieron Pollard	Andrew Balbirnie	Sabina Park, Jamaica	West Indies by 24 runs
ODI 4340	13 January	Kieron Pollard	Paul Stirling	Sabina Park, Jamaica	Ireland by 5 wickets (DLS)
ODI 4342	16 January	Kieron Pollard	Paul Stirling	Sabina Park, Jamaica	Ireland by 2 wickets

=== Zimbabwe in Sri Lanka ===
2020–2023 ICC Cricket World Cup Super League – ODI series
No.	Date	Home captain	Away captain	Venue	Result
ODI 4341	16 January	Dasun Shanaka	Craig Ervine	Pallekele International Cricket Stadium, Kandy	Sri Lanka by 5 wickets
ODI 4343	18 January	Dasun Shanaka	Craig Ervine	Pallekele International Cricket Stadium, Kandy	Zimbabwe by 20 runs
ODI 4347	21 January	Dasun Shanaka	Craig Ervine	Pallekele International Cricket Stadium, Kandy	Sri Lanka by 184 runs

=== England women in Australia ===
WT20I series
No.	Date	Home captain	Away captain	Venue	Result
WT20I 1019	20 January	Meg Lanning	Heather Knight	Adelaide Oval, Adelaide	Australia by 9 wickets
WT20I 1022	22 January	Meg Lanning	Heather Knight	Adelaide Oval, Adelaide	No result
WT20I 1023a	23 January	Meg Lanning	Heather Knight	Adelaide Oval, Adelaide	Match abandoned
Only WTest
No.	Date	Home captain	Away captain	Venue	Result
WTest 143	27–30 January	Meg Lanning	Heather Knight	Manuka Oval, Canberra	Match drawn
WODI series
No.	Date	Home captain	Away captain	Venue	Result
WODI 1234	3 February	Meg Lanning	Heather Knight	Manuka Oval, Canberra	Australia by 27 runs
WODI 1236	6 February	Meg Lanning	Heather Knight	Junction Oval, Melbourne	Australia by 5 wickets
WODI 1238	8 February	Meg Lanning	Heather Knight	Junction Oval, Melbourne	Australia by 8 wickets

=== Netherlands vs Afghanistan in Qatar ===
2020–2023 ICC Cricket World Cup Super League – ODI series
No.	Date	Home captain	Away captain	Venue	Result
ODI 4345	21 January	Hashmatullah Shahidi	Pieter Seelaar	West End Park International Cricket Stadium, Doha	Afghanistan by 36 runs
ODI 4348	23 January	Hashmatullah Shahidi	Pieter Seelaar	West End Park International Cricket Stadium, Doha	Afghanistan by 48 runs
ODI 4350	25 January	Hashmatullah Shahidi	Pieter Seelaar	West End Park International Cricket Stadium, Doha	Afghanistan by 75 runs

=== England in West Indies ===
T20I series
No.	Date	Home captain	Away captain	Venue	Result
T20I 1453	22 January	Kieron Pollard	Eoin Morgan	Kensington Oval, Barbados	West Indies by 9 wickets
T20I 1454	23 January	Kieron Pollard	Eoin Morgan	Kensington Oval, Barbados	England by 1 run
T20I 1455	26 January	Kieron Pollard	Moeen Ali	Kensington Oval, Barbados	West Indies by 20 runs
T20I 1456	29 January	Kieron Pollard	Moeen Ali	Kensington Oval, Barbados	England by 34 runs
T20I 1457	30 January	Kieron Pollard	Moeen Ali	Kensington Oval, Barbados	West Indies by 17 runs
Richards–Botham Trophy, 2021–2023 ICC World Test Championship – Test series
No.	Date	Home captain	Away captain	Venue	Result
Test 2454	8–12 March	Kraigg Brathwaite	Joe Root	Sir Vivian Richards Stadium, Antigua	Match drawn
Test 2457	16–20 March	Kraigg Brathwaite	Joe Root	Kensington Oval, Barbados	Match drawn
Test 2459	24–28 March	Kraigg Brathwaite	Joe Root	National Cricket Stadium, Grenada	West Indies by 10 wickets

=== West Indies women in South Africa ===
WODI series
No.	Date	Home captain	Away captain	Venue	Result
WODI 1232	28 January	Suné Luus	Stafanie Taylor	Wanderers Stadium, Johannesburg	No result
WODI 1233	31 January	Suné Luus	Stafanie Taylor	Wanderers Stadium, Johannesburg	Match tied (West Indies won S/O)
WODI 1235	3 February	Suné Luus	Stafanie Taylor	Wanderers Stadium, Johannesburg	South Africa by 96 runs
WODI 1237	6 February	Suné Luus	Anisa Mohammed	Wanderers Stadium, Johannesburg	South Africa by 6 wickets

=== New Zealand in Australia ===
On 19 January 2022, the tour was postponed due to uncertainty of the New Zealand players' quarantine requirements when they return home.

2020–2023 ICC Cricket World Cup Super League, Chappell–Hadlee Trophy – ODI series
No.	Date	Home captain	Away captain	Venue	Result
1st ODI	30 January			Perth Stadium, Perth	
2nd ODI	2 February			Bellerive Oval, Hobart	
3rd ODI	5 February			Sydney Cricket Ground, Sydney	
T20I series
No.	Date	Home captain	Away captain	Venue	Result
Only T20I	8 February			Manuka Oval, Canberra	

== February ==
=== UAE in Oman ===
2019–2023 ICC Cricket World Cup League 2 – ODI series
No.	Date	Home captain	Away captain	Venue	Result
ODI 4351	5 February	Zeeshan Maqsood	Ahmed Raza	Oman Cricket Academy Ground Turf 1, Muscat	United Arab Emirates by 4 wickets
ODI 4352	6 February	Zeeshan Maqsood	Ahmed Raza	Oman Cricket Academy Ground Turf 1, Muscat	United Arab Emirates by 4 wickets
ODI 4354	8 February	Zeeshan Maqsood	Ahmed Raza	Oman Cricket Academy Ground Turf 1, Muscat	Match tied

=== West Indies in India ===
2020–2023 ICC Cricket World Cup Super League – ODI series
No.	Date	Home captain	Away captain	Venue	Result
ODI 4353	6 February	Rohit Sharma	Kieron Pollard	Narendra Modi Stadium, Ahmedabad	India by 6 wickets
ODI 4355	9 February	Rohit Sharma	Nicholas Pooran	Narendra Modi Stadium, Ahmedabad	India by 44 runs
ODI 4356	11 February	Rohit Sharma	Nicholas Pooran	Narendra Modi Stadium, Ahmedabad	India by 96 runs
T20I series
No.	Date	Home captain	Away captain	Venue	Result
T20I 1467	16 February	Rohit Sharma	Kieron Pollard	Eden Gardens, Kolkata	India by 6 wickets
T20I 1473	18 February	Rohit Sharma	Kieron Pollard	Eden Gardens, Kolkata	India by 8 runs
T20I 1479	20 February	Rohit Sharma	Kieron Pollard	Eden Gardens, Kolkata	India by 17 runs

=== India women in New Zealand ===
Only T20I
No.	Date	Home captain	Away captain	Venue	Result
WT20I 1026	9 February	Sophie Devine	Harmanpreet Kaur	John Davies Oval, Queenstown	New Zealand by 18 runs
WODI series
No.	Date	Home captain	Away captain	Venue	Result
WODI 1239	12 February	Sophie Devine	Mithali Raj	John Davies Oval, Queenstown	New Zealand by 62 runs
WODI 1240	15 February	Amy Satterthwaite	Mithali Raj	John Davies Oval, Queenstown	New Zealand by 3 wickets
WODI 1241	18 February	Sophie Devine	Mithali Raj	John Davies Oval, Queenstown	New Zealand by 3 wickets
WODI 1242	22 February	Sophie Devine	Mithali Raj	John Davies Oval, Queenstown	New Zealand by 63 runs
WODI 1243	24 February	Sophie Devine	Mithali Raj	John Davies Oval, Queenstown	India by 6 wickets

=== Sri Lanka in Australia ===
T20I series
No.	Date	Home captain	Away captain	Venue	Result
T20I 1458	11 February	Aaron Finch	Dasun Shanaka	Sydney Cricket Ground, Sydney	Australia by 20 runs (DLS)
T20I 1463	13 February	Aaron Finch	Dasun Shanaka	Sydney Cricket Ground, Sydney	Match tied (Australia won S/O)
T20I 1466	15 February	Aaron Finch	Dasun Shanaka	Manuka Oval, Canberra	Australia by 6 wickets
T20I 1470	18 February	Aaron Finch	Dasun Shanaka	Melbourne Cricket Ground, Melbourne	Australia by 6 wickets
T20I 1478	20 February	Aaron Finch	Dasun Shanaka	Melbourne Cricket Ground, Melbourne	Sri Lanka by 5 wickets

=== South Africa in New Zealand ===
2021–2023 ICC World Test Championship – Test series
No.	Date	Home captain	Away captain	Venue	Result
Test 2450	17–21 February	Tom Latham	Dean Elgar	Hagley Oval, Christchurch	New Zealand by an innings and 276 runs
Test 2451	25 February – 1 March	Tom Latham	Dean Elgar	Hagley Oval, Christchurch	South Africa won by 198 runs

=== Afghanistan in Bangladesh ===
2020–2023 ICC Cricket World Cup Super League – ODI series
No.	Date	Home captain	Away captain	Venue	Result
ODI 4357	23 February	Tamim Iqbal	Hashmatullah Shahidi	Zohur Ahmed Chowdhury Stadium, Chittagong	Bangladesh by 4 wickets
ODI 4358	25 February	Tamim Iqbal	Hashmatullah Shahidi	Zohur Ahmed Chowdhury Stadium, Chittagong	Bangladesh by 88 runs
ODI 4359	28 February	Tamim Iqbal	Hashmatullah Shahidi	Zohur Ahmed Chowdhury Stadium, Chittagong	Afghanistan by 7 wickets
T20I series
No.	Date	Home captain	Away captain	Venue	Result
T20I 1495	3 March	Mahmudullah	Mohammad Nabi	Sher-e-Bangla National Cricket Stadium, Dhaka	Bangladesh by 61 runs
T20I 1496	5 March	Mahmudullah	Mohammad Nabi	Sher-e-Bangla National Cricket Stadium, Dhaka	Afghanistan by 8 wickets

=== Sri Lanka in India ===
T20I series
No.	Date	Home captain	Away captain	Venue	Result
T20I 1492	24 February	Rohit Sharma	Dasun Shanaka	Ekana Cricket Stadium, Lucknow	India by 62 runs
T20I 1493	26 February	Rohit Sharma	Dasun Shanaka	Himachal Pradesh Cricket Association Stadium, Dharamshala	India by 7 wickets
T20I 1494	27 February	Rohit Sharma	Dasun Shanaka	Himachal Pradesh Cricket Association Stadium, Dharamshala	India by 6 wickets
2021–2023 ICC World Test Championship – Test series
No.	Date	Home captain	Away captain	Venue	Result
Test 2452	4–8 March	Rohit Sharma	Dimuth Karunaratne	Punjab Cricket Association IS Bindra Stadium, Mohali	India by an innings and 222 runs
Test 2456	12–16 March	Rohit Sharma	Dimuth Karunaratne	M. Chinnaswamy Stadium, Bangalore	India by 238 runs

=== Afghanistan in Zimbabwe ===
The tour was postponed in January 2022, after Zimbabwe Cricket could not secure all the broadcasting services including the Decision Review System.

2020–2023 ICC Cricket World Cup Super League – ODI series
No.	Date	Home captain	Away captain	Venue	Result
[1st ODI]					
[2nd ODI]					
[3rd ODI]					
T20I series
No.	Date	Home captain	Away captain	Venue	Result
[1st T20I]					
[2nd T20I]					
[3rd T20I]					
[4th T20I]					
[5th T20I]					

== March ==
=== 2022 Women's Cricket World Cup ===
Pos	Team	Pld	W	L	T	NR	Pts	NRR
1	Australia (C)	7	7	0	0	0	14	1.283
2	South Africa	7	5	1	0	1	11	0.078
3	England (R)	7	4	3	0	0	8	0.949
4	West Indies	7	3	3	0	1	7	−0.885
5	India	7	3	4	0	0	6	0.642
6	New Zealand (H)	7	3	4	0	0	6	0.027
7	Bangladesh	7	1	6	0	0	2	−0.999
8	Pakistan	7	1	6	0	0	2	−1.313

Source: ESPNcricinfo
(C) Champions; (H) Host; (R) Runners-up

Advance to Knockout Stage

Group stage
No.	Date	Team 1	Captain 1	Team 2	Captain 2	Venue	Result
WODI 1244	4 March	New Zealand	Sophie Devine	West Indies	Stafanie Taylor	Bay Oval, Mount Maunganui	West Indies by 3 runs
WODI 1245	5 March	South Africa	Suné Luus	Bangladesh	Nigar Sultana	University Oval, Dunedin	South Africa by 32 runs
WODI 1246	5 March	Australia	Meg Lanning	England	Heather Knight	Seddon Park, Hamilton	Australia by 12 runs
WODI 1247	6 March	India	Mithali Raj	Pakistan	Bismah Maroof	Bay Oval, Mount Maunganui	India by 107 runs
WODI 1248	7 March	New Zealand	Sophie Devine	Bangladesh	Nigar Sultana	University Oval, Dunedin	New Zealand by 9 wickets
WODI 1249	8 March	Australia	Meg Lanning	Pakistan	Bismah Maroof	Bay Oval, Mount Maunganui	Australia by 7 wickets
WODI 1250	9 March	England	Heather Knight	West Indies	Stafanie Taylor	University Oval, Dunedin	West Indies by 7 runs
WODI 1251	10 March	New Zealand	Sophie Devine	India	Mithali Raj	Seddon Park, Hamilton	New Zealand by 62 runs
WODI 1252	11 March	South Africa	Suné Luus	Pakistan	Bismah Maroof	Bay Oval, Mount Maunganui	South Africa by 6 runs
WODI 1253	12 March	India	Mithali Raj	West Indies	Stafanie Taylor	Seddon Park, Hamilton	India by 155 runs
WODI 1254	13 March	New Zealand	Sophie Devine	Australia	Meg Lanning	Basin Reserve, Wellington	Australia by 141 runs
WODI 1255	14 March	Bangladesh	Nigar Sultana	Pakistan	Bismah Maroof	Seddon Park, Hamilton	Bangladesh by 9 runs
WODI 1256	14 March	England	Heather Knight	South Africa	Suné Luus	Bay Oval, Mount Maunganui	South Africa by 3 wickets
WODI 1257	15 March	Australia	Meg Lanning	West Indies	Stafanie Taylor	Basin Reserve, Wellington	Australia by 7 wickets
WODI 1258	16 March	England	Heather Knight	India	Mithali Raj	Bay Oval, Mount Maunganui	England by 4 wickets
WODI 1259	17 March	New Zealand	Sophie Devine	South Africa	Suné Luus	Seddon Park, Hamilton	South Africa by 2 wickets
WODI 1260	18 March	Bangladesh	Nigar Sultana	West Indies	Stafanie Taylor	Bay Oval, Mount Maunganui	West Indies by 4 runs
WODI 1261	19 March	Australia	Meg Lanning	India	Mithali Raj	Eden Park, Auckland	Australia by 6 wickets
WODI 1262	20 March	New Zealand	Sophie Devine	England	Heather Knight	Eden Park, Auckland	England by 1 wicket
WODI 1263	21 March	Pakistan	Bismah Maroof	West Indies	Stafanie Taylor	Seddon Park, Hamilton	Pakistan by 8 wickets
WODI 1264	22 March	Australia	Meg Lanning	South Africa	Suné Luus	Basin Reserve, Wellington	Australia by 5 wickets
WODI 1265	22 March	Bangladesh	Nigar Sultana	India	Mithali Raj	Seddon Park, Hamilton	India by 110 runs
WODI 1266	24 March	South Africa	Suné Luus	West Indies	Stafanie Taylor	Basin Reserve, Wellington	No result
WODI 1267	24 March	England	Heather Knight	Pakistan	Bismah Maroof	Hagley Oval, Christchurch	England won by 9 wickets
WODI 1268	25 March	Australia	Meg Lanning	Bangladesh	Nigar Sultana	Basin Reserve, Wellington	Australia by 5 wickets
WODI 1269	26 March	New Zealand	Sophie Devine	Pakistan	Bismah Maroof	Hagley Oval, Christchurch	New Zealand by 71 runs
WODI 1270	27 March	Bangladesh	Nigar Sultana	England	Heather Knight	Basin Reserve, Wellington	England by 100 runs
WODI 1271	27 March	India	Mithali Raj	South Africa	Suné Luus	Hagley Oval, Christchurch	South Africa by 3 wickets
Semi-finals
No.	Date	Team 1	Captain 1	Team 2	Captain 2	Venue	Result
WODI 1272	30 March	Australia	Meg Lanning	West Indies	Stafanie Taylor	Basin Reserve, Wellington	Australia by 157 runs
WODI 1273	31 March	South Africa	Suné Luus	England	Heather Knight	Hagley Oval, Christchurch	England by 130 runs
Final
No.	Date	Team 1	Captain 1	Team 2	Captain 2	Venue	Result
WODI 1274	3 April	Australia	Meg Lanning	England	Heather Knight	Hagley Oval, Christchurch	Australia by 71 runs

=== Australia in Pakistan ===
Benaud–Qadir Trophy, 2021–2023 ICC World Test Championship – Test series
No.	Date	Home captain	Away captain	Venue	Result
Test 2453	4–8 March	Babar Azam	Pat Cummins	Rawalpindi Cricket Stadium, Rawalpindi	Match drawn
Test 2455	12–16 March	Babar Azam	Pat Cummins	National Stadium, Karachi	Match drawn
Test 2458	21–25 March	Babar Azam	Pat Cummins	Gaddafi Stadium, Lahore	Australia by 115 runs
2020–2023 ICC Cricket World Cup Super League – ODI series
No.	Date	Home captain	Away captain	Venue	Result
ODI 4379	29 March	Babar Azam	Aaron Finch	Gaddafi Stadium, Lahore	Australia by 88 runs
ODI 4380	31 March	Babar Azam	Aaron Finch	Gaddafi Stadium, Lahore	Pakistan by 6 wickets
ODI 4382	2 April	Babar Azam	Aaron Finch	Gaddafi Stadium, Lahore	Pakistan by 9 wickets
T20I series
No.	Date	Home captain	Away captain	Venue	Result
T20I 1504	5 April	Babar Azam	Aaron Finch	Gaddafi Stadium, Lahore	Australia by 3 wickets

=== 2022 United Arab Emirates Tri-Nation Series (round 9) ===
2019–2023 ICC Cricket World Cup League 2 – Tri-series
No.	Date	Team 1	Captain 1	Team 2	Captain 2	Venue	Result
ODI 4360	5 March	United Arab Emirates	Ahmed Raza	Oman	Zeeshan Maqsood	ICC Academy Ground, Dubai	Oman by 12 runs
ODI 4631	6 March	Namibia	Gerhard Erasmus	Oman	Khawar Ali	ICC Academy Ground, Dubai	Namibia by 110 runs
ODI 4632	8 March	United Arab Emirates	Ahmed Raza	Namibia	Gerhard Erasmus	ICC Academy Ground, Dubai	United Arab Emirates by 3 wickets
ODI 4633	9 March	United Arab Emirates	Ahmed Raza	Oman	Zeeshan Maqsood	ICC Academy Ground, Dubai	Oman by 8 runs
ODI 4364	11 March	Namibia	Gerhard Erasmus	Oman	Zeeshan Maqsood	Sharjah Cricket Stadium, Sharjah	Oman by 7 wickets
ODI 4365	12 March	United Arab Emirates	Ahmed Raza	Namibia	Gerhard Erasmus	Sharjah Cricket Stadium, Sharjah	United Arab Emirates by 43 runs
ODI 4366	14 March	Namibia	Gerhard Erasmus	Oman	Zeeshan Maqsood	Dubai International Cricket Stadium, Dubai	Namibia by 5 wickets

=== 2022 United Arab Emirates Tri-Nation Series (round 10) ===
2019–2023 ICC Cricket World Cup League 2 – Tri-series
No.	Date	Team 1	Captain 1	Team 2	Captain 2	Venue	Result
ODI 4367	15 March	United Arab Emirates	Ahmed Raza	Papua New Guinea	Assad Vala	Sharjah Cricket Stadium, Sharjah	United Arab Emirates by 7 wickets
ODI 4368	16 March	Nepal	Sandeep Lamichhane	Papua New Guinea	Assad Vala	Sharjah Cricket Stadium, Sharjah	Nepal by 2 wickets
ODI 4369	18 March	United Arab Emirates	Ahmed Raza	Nepal	Sandeep Lamichhane	Dubai International Cricket Stadium, Dubai	United Arab Emirates by 48 runs
ODI 4371	19 March	United Arab Emirates	Ahmed Raza	Papua New Guinea	Assad Vala	Dubai International Cricket Stadium, Dubai	Papua New Guinea by 6 wickets
ODI 4373	21 March	United Arab Emirates	Ahmed Raza	Nepal	Sandeep Lamichhane	Dubai International Cricket Stadium, Dubai	United Arab Emirates by 99 runs
ODI 4374	22 March	Nepal	Sandeep Lamichhane	Papua New Guinea	Assad Vala	Dubai International Cricket Stadium, Dubai	Nepal by 7 wickets

=== Australia in New Zealand ===
The series was abandoned due to no managed isolation and quarantine (MIQ) availability for the Australian team.

T20I series
No.	Date	Home captain	Away captain	Venue	Result
1st T20I	17 March			McLean Park, Napier	
2nd T20I	18 March			McLean Park, Napier	
3rd T20I	20 March			McLean Park, Napier	

=== Bangladesh in South Africa ===
2020–2023 ICC Cricket World Cup Super League – ODI series
No.	Date	Home captain	Away captain	Venue	Result
ODI 4370	18 March	Temba Bavuma	Tamim Iqbal	Centurion Park, Centurion	Bangladesh by 38 runs
ODI 4372	20 March	Temba Bavuma	Tamim Iqbal	Wanderers Stadium, Johannesburg	South Africa by 7 wickets
ODI 4375	23 March	Temba Bavuma	Tamim Iqbal	Centurion Park, Centurion	Bangladesh by 9 wickets
2021–2023 ICC World Test Championship – Test series
No.	Date	Home captain	Away captain	Venue	Result
Test 2460	31 March – 4 April	Dean Elgar	Mominul Haque	Kingsmead Cricket Ground, Durban	South Africa by 220 runs
Test 2461	8–12 April	Dean Elgar	Mominul Haque	St George's Park, Port Elizabeth	South Africa by 332 runs

=== Netherlands in New Zealand ===
Only T20I
No.	Date	Home captain	Away captain	Venue	Result
T20I 1496a	25 March	Tom Latham	Pieter Seelaar	McLean Park, Napier	Match abandoned
2020–2023 ICC Cricket World Cup Super League – ODI series
No.	Date	Home captain	Away captain	Venue	Result
ODI 4378	29 March	Tom Latham	Pieter Seelaar	Bay Oval, Tauranga	New Zealand by 7 wickets
ODI 4381	2 April	Tom Latham	Pieter Seelaar	Seddon Park, Hamilton	New Zealand by 118 runs
ODI 4383	4 April	Tom Latham	Pieter Seelaar	Seddon Park, Hamilton	New Zealand by 115 runs

=== Papua New Guinea in Nepal ===
ODI series
No.	Date	Home captain	Away captain	Venue	Result
ODI 4376	25 March	Sandeep Lamichhane	Assad Vala	Tribhuvan University International Cricket Ground, Kirtipur	Papua New Guinea by 6 runs
ODI 4377	26 March	Sandeep Lamichhane	Assad Vala	Tribhuvan University International Cricket Ground, Kirtipur	Papua New Guinea by 3 wickets

=== Afghanistan in India ===
2020–2023 ICC Cricket World Cup Super League – ODI series
No.	Date	Home captain	Away captain	Venue	Result
[1st ODI]					
[2nd ODI]					
[3rd ODI]					

== April ==
=== 2022 Papua New Guinea Tri-Nation Series ===
2019–2023 ICC Cricket World Cup League 2 – Tri-series
No.	Date	Team 1	Captain 1	Team 2	Captain 2	Venue	Result
ODI 4384	9 April	Papua New Guinea	Assad Vala	Scotland	Kyle Coetzer	Dubai International Cricket Stadium, Dubai	Scotland by 162 runs
ODI 4385	10 April	Oman	Zeeshan Maqsood	Scotland	Kyle Coetzer	Dubai International Cricket Stadium, Dubai	Scotland by 4 runs
ODI 4386	12 April	Oman	Khawar Ali	Papua New Guinea	Assad Vala	Dubai International Cricket Stadium, Dubai	Oman by 7 wickets
ODI 4387	13 April	Papua New Guinea	Assad Vala	Scotland	Kyle Coetzer	Dubai International Cricket Stadium, Dubai	Scotland by 123 runs
ODI 4388	15 April	Oman	Zeeshan Maqsood	Scotland	Kyle Coetzer	Dubai International Cricket Stadium, Dubai	Scotland by 2 wickets
ODI 4389	16 April	Oman	Zeeshan Maqsood	Papua New Guinea	Assad Vala	Dubai International Cricket Stadium, Dubai	Oman by 85 runs

== See also ==
- Associate international cricket in 2021–22
