= Associate international cricket in 2021–22 =

International cricket season

The 2021–22 Associate international cricket season was from September 2021 to April 2022. All official twenty over matches between Associate members of the ICC were eligible to have full Twenty20 International (T20I) or Women's Twenty20 International (WT20I) status, as the International Cricket Council (ICC) granted T20I status to matches between all of its members from 1 July 2018 (women's teams) and 1 January 2019 (men's teams). The season included all T20I/WT20I cricket series mostly involving ICC Associate members, that were played in addition to series covered in International cricket in 2021–22.

== Season overview ==
International tours
Start date	Home team	Away team	Results [Matches]
Start date	Home team	Away team	T20I
5 October 2021	Cyprus	Estonia	2–0 [2]
5 October 2021	United Arab Emirates	Namibia	0-1 [1]
9 October 2021	Namibia	Scotland	1-0 [1]
10 October 2021	Namibia	Papua New Guinea	1-0 [1]
19 October 2021	Nigeria	Sierra Leone	5–1 [6]
25 October 2021	Malta	Gibraltar	0–0 [2]
8 April 2022	Namibia	Uganda	2–1 [3]
13 April 2022	Cayman Islands	Bahamas	5–0 [5]
International tournaments
Start date	Tournament		Winners
10 September 2021	2021–22 Uganda Tri-Nation Series		Uganda
6 October 2021	2021 Cyprus T20I Cup		Isle of Man
11 October 2021 (Note: The tournament was cancelled due to the COVID-19 pandemic.)	(Japan) 2021 ICC Men's T20 World Cup EAP Qualifier		Cancelled
15 October 2021	(Spain) 2021 ICC Men's T20 World Cup Europe Qualifier		Jersey
16 October 2021	(Rwanda) 2021 ICC Men's T20 World Cup Africa Qualifier A		Uganda
21 October 2021	(Malta) 2021 Valletta Cup		Malta
23 October 2021	(Qatar) 2021 ICC Men's T20 World Cup Asia Qualifier A		Bahrain
2 November 2021	(Rwanda) 2021 ICC Men's T20 World Cup Africa Qualifier B		Tanzania
7 November 2021	(Antigua and Barbuda) 2021 ICC Men's T20 World Cup Americas Qualifier		United States
9 November 2021 (Note: The tournament was cancelled due to the COVID-19 pandemic.)	(Malaysia) 2021 ICC Men's T20 World Cup Asia Qualifier B		Cancelled
17 November 2021	(Rwanda) 2021 ICC Men's T20 World Cup Africa Qualifier Final		Uganda
11 February 2022	2021–22 Oman Quadrangular Series		United Arab Emirates
18 February 2022	(Oman) 2022 ICC Men's T20 World Cup Global Qualifier A		United Arab Emirates
28 March 2022	2021–22 Nepal T20I Tri-Nation Series		Nepal

Women's international tours
Start date	Home team	Away team	Results [Matches]
Start date	Home team	Away team	WT20I
25 September 2021	Austria	Belgium	3–0 [3]
16 November 2021	Qatar	Nepal	0–3 [3]
27 April 2022	United Arab Emirates	Hong Kong	4–0 [4]
Women's international tournaments
Start date	Tournament		Winners
3 September 2021 (Note: The tournament was cancelled due to the COVID-19 pandemic.)	(Samoa) 2021 ICC Women's T20 World Cup EAP Qualifier		Cancelled
9 September 2021	(Botswana) 2021 ICC Women's T20 World Cup Africa Qualifier		Zimbabwe
18 October 2021	(Mexico) 2021 ICC Women's T20 World Cup Americas Qualifier		United States
22 November 2021	(United Arab Emirates) 2021 ICC Women's T20 World Cup Asia Qualifier		United Arab Emirates
18 January 2022	(Malaysia) 2022 Commonwealth Games Cricket Qualifier		Sri Lanka
20 March 2022	(Oman) 2022 GCC Women's Gulf Cup		United Arab Emirates
28 March 2022	2022 Nigeria Invitational Women's T20I Tournament		Rwanda
20 April 2022	(Namibia) 2022 Capricorn Women's Tri-Series		Zimbabwe

== September ==
=== 2021 ICC Women's T20 World Cup EAP Qualifier ===
The tournament was cancelled due to COVID-19 pandemic.

=== 2021 ICC Women's T20 World Cup Africa Qualifier ===
Teams	P	W	L	T	NR	Pts	NRR
Zimbabwe	5	5	0	0	0	10	+4.435
Tanzania	5	4	1	0	0	6	+5.764
Rwanda	5	3	2	0	0	6	+2.030
Botswana	5	2	3	0	0	4	+1.786
Mozambique	5	1	4	0	0	2	–5.416
Eswatini	5	0	5	0	0	0	–9.094

Teams	P	W	L	T	NR	Pts	NRR
Namibia	4	4	0	0	0	8	+2.795
Uganda	4	3	1	0	0	6	+3.030
Nigeria	4	2	2	0	0	4	–0.277
Sierra Leone	4	1	3	0	0	2	–1.232
Cameroon	4	0	4	0	0	0	–5.367

Group stage
No.	Date	Team 1	Captain 1	Team 2	Captain 2	Venue	Result
WT20I 948	9 September	Mozambique	Olga Matsolo	Rwanda	Marie Bimenyimana	Botswana Cricket Association Oval 1, Gaborone	Rwanda by 10 wickets
WT20I 949	9 September	Namibia	Irene van Zyl	Uganda	Immaculate Nakisuuyi	Botswana Cricket Association Oval 2, Gaborone	Namibia by 4 runs
WT20I 950	9 September	Botswana	Laura Mophakedi	Eswatini	Ntombizini Gwebu	Botswana Cricket Association Oval 1, Gaborone	Botswana by 195 runs
WT20I 951	9 September	Nigeria	Blessing Etim	Sierra Leone	Linda Bull	Botswana Cricket Association Oval 2, Gaborone	Nigeria by 5 wickets
WT20I 953	10 September	Tanzania	Hudaa Omary	Zimbabwe	Mary-Anne Musonda	Botswana Cricket Association Oval 1, Gaborone	Zimbabwe by 6 wickets
WT20I 954	10 September	Botswana	Laura Mophakedi	Mozambique	Olga Matsolo	Botswana Cricket Association Oval 1, Gaborone	Botswana by 110 runs
WT20I 955	10 September	Namibia	Irene van Zyl	Nigeria	Blessing Etim	Botswana Cricket Association Oval 2, Gaborone	Namibia by 59 runs
WT20I 956	11 September	Eswatini	Ntombizini Gwebu	Zimbabwe	Mary-Anne Musonda	Botswana Cricket Association Oval 1, Gaborone	Zimbabwe by 10 wickets
WT20I 957	11 September	Mozambique	Olga Matsolo	Tanzania	Hudaa Omary	Botswana Cricket Association Oval 1, Gaborone	Tanzania by 200 runs
WT20I 958	11 September	Nigeria	Blessing Etim	Uganda	Immaculate Nakisuuyi	Botswana Cricket Association Oval 2, Gaborone	Uganda by 43 runs
WT20I 959	12 September	Eswatini	Ntombizini Gwebu	Rwanda	Marie Bimenyimana	Botswana Cricket Association Oval 1, Gaborone	Rwanda by 185 runs
WT20I 960	12 September	Botswana	Laura Mophakedi	Zimbabwe	Mary-Anne Musonda	Botswana Cricket Association Oval 2, Gaborone	Zimbabwe by 82 runs
WT20I 961	12 September	Cameroon	Michelle Ekani	Uganda	Immaculate Nakisuuyi	Botswana Cricket Association Oval 2, Gaborone	Uganda by 155 runs
WT20I 962	13 September	Rwanda	Marie Bimenyimana	Tanzania	Hudaa Omary	Botswana Cricket Association Oval 1, Gaborone	Tanzania by 43 runs
WT20I 963	13 September	Namibia	Irene van Zyl	Sierra Leone	Linda Bull	Botswana Cricket Association Oval 2, Gaborone	Namibia by 57 runs
WT20I 964	13 September	Mozambique	Olga Matsolo	Zimbabwe	Josephine Nkomo	Botswana Cricket Association Oval 1, Gaborone	Zimbabwe by 171 runs
WT20I 965	13 September	Cameroon	Michelle Ekani	Nigeria	Blessing Etim	Botswana Cricket Association Oval 2, Gaborone	Nigeria by 10 wickets
WT20I 966	14 September	Eswatini	Ntombizini Gwebu	Tanzania	Hudaa Omary	Botswana Cricket Association Oval 1, Gaborone	Tanzania by 256 runs
WT20I 967	14 September	Sierra Leone	Linda Bull	Uganda	Immaculate Nakisuuyi	Botswana Cricket Association Oval 1, Gaborone	Uganda by 9 wickets
WT20I 968	14 September	Botswana	Laura Mophakedi	Rwanda	Marie Bimenyimana	Botswana Cricket Association Oval 1, Gaborone	Rwanda by 3 wickets
WT20I 969	14 September	Cameroon	Michelle Ekani	Namibia	Irene van Zyl	Botswana Cricket Association Oval 1, Gaborone	Namibia by 8 wickets
WT20I 970	15 September	Cameroon	Michelle Ekani	Sierra Leone	Linda Bull	Botswana Cricket Association Oval 2, Gaborone	Sierra Leone by 6 wickets
WT20I 971	16 September	Eswatini	Ntombizini Gwebu	Mozambique	Olga Matsolo	Botswana Cricket Association Oval 1, Gaborone	Mozambique by 83 runs
WT20I 972	16 September	Rwanda	Marie Bimenyimana	Zimbabwe	Mary-Anne Musonda	Botswana Cricket Association Oval 2, Gaborone	Zimbabwe by 52 runs
WT20I 973	16 September	Botswana	Laura Mophakedi	Tanzania	Hudaa Omary	Botswana Cricket Association Oval 1, Gaborone	Tanzania by 7 wickets
Play-offs
WT20I 974	17 September	Uganda	Immaculate Nakisuuyi	Zimbabwe	Mary-Anne Musonda	Botswana Cricket Association Oval 1, Gaborone	Zimbabwe by 14 runs
WT20I 975	17 September	Namibia	Irene van Zyl	Tanzania	Hudaa Omary	Botswana Cricket Association Oval 1, Gaborone	Namibia by 2 wickets
WT20I 976	19 September	Tanzania	Hudaa Omary	Uganda	Immaculate Nakisuuyi	Botswana Cricket Association Oval 1, Gaborone	Tanzania by 9 wickets
WT20I 977	19 September	Namibia	Irene van Zyl	Zimbabwe	Mary-Anne Musonda	Botswana Cricket Association Oval 1, Gaborone	Zimbabwe by 13 runs

=== 2021–22 Uganda Tri-Nation Series ===
Team	P	W	L	T	NR	Pts	NRR
Uganda	6	4	1	0	1	9	+1.198
Kenya	6	3	2	0	1	7	+1.327
Nigeria	6	1	5	0	0	2	–2.174

Advanced to the final

Round-robin
No.	Date	Team 1	Captain 1	Team 2	Captain 2	Venue	Result
T20I 1261	10 September	Uganda	Brian Masaba	Kenya	Shem Ngoche	Entebbe Cricket Oval, Entebbe	No result
T20I 1264	10 September	Uganda	Brian Masaba	Kenya	Shem Ngoche	Entebbe Cricket Oval, Entebbe	Kenya by 22 runs
T20I 1267	11 September	Kenya	Shem Ngoche	Nigeria	Joshua Ayannaike	Entebbe Cricket Oval, Entebbe	Kenya by 8 wickets
T20I 1269	11 September	Uganda	Brian Masaba	Nigeria	Joshua Ayannaike	Entebbe Cricket Oval, Entebbe	Uganda by 56 runs
T20I 1271	13 September	Uganda	Deusdedit Muhumuza	Nigeria	Joshua Ayannaike	Entebbe Cricket Oval, Entebbe	Uganda by 8 wickets
T20I 1272	13 September	Kenya	Shem Ngoche	Nigeria	Joshua Ayannaike	Entebbe Cricket Oval, Entebbe	Kenya by 61 runs
T20I 1274	15 September	Uganda	Deusdedit Muhumuza	Kenya	Shem Ngoche	Entebbe Cricket Oval, Entebbe	Uganda by 4 wickets
T20I 1275	15 September	Uganda	Deusdedit Muhumuza	Nigeria	Joshua Ayannaike	Entebbe Cricket Oval, Entebbe	Uganda by 55 runs
T20I 1277	16 September	Kenya	Shem Ngoche	Nigeria	Joshua Ayannaike	Entebbe Cricket Oval, Entebbe	Nigeria by 4 runs (DLS)
Final
T20I 1278	17 September	Uganda	Deusdedit Muhumuza	Kenya	Shem Ngoche	Entebbe Cricket Oval, Entebbe	Uganda by 6 runs

=== Belgium women in Austria ===
WT20I series
No.	Date	Home captain	Away captain	Venue	Result
WT20I 978	25 September	Gandhali Bapat	Nicola Thrupp	Seebarn Cricket Ground, Lower Austria	Austria by 118 runs
WT20I 979	25 September	Gandhali Bapat	Nicola Thrupp	Seebarn Cricket Ground, Lower Austria	Austria by 112 runs
WT20I 980	26 September	Gandhali Bapat	Nicola Thrupp	Seebarn Cricket Ground, Lower Austria	Austria by 74 runs

== October ==
=== Estonia in Cyprus and 2021 Cyprus T20I Cup ===
T20I series
No.	Date	Home captain	Away captain	Venue	Result
T20I 1282	5 October	Michalis Kyriacou	Marko Vaik	Happy Valley Ground, Episkopi	Cyprus by 4 wickets
T20I 1283	5 October	Michalis Kyriacou	Marko Vaik	Happy Valley Ground, Episkopi	Cyprus by 8 wickets

Team	P	W	L	T	NR	Pts	NRR
Isle of Man	4	4	0	0	0	8	+2.541
Cyprus	4	2	2	0	0	4	+0.719
Estonia	4	0	4	0	0	0	–3.228

Round-robin
No.	Date	Team 1	Captain 1	Team 2	Captain 2	Venue	Result
T20I 1284	6 October	Cyprus	Michalis Kyriacou	Isle of Man	Matthew Ansell	Happy Valley Ground, Episkopi	Isle of Man by 8 wickets
T20I 1285	6 October	Estonia	Marko Vaik	Isle of Man	Matthew Ansell	Happy Valley Ground, Episkopi	Isle of Man by 6 wickets
T20I 1287	7 October	Cyprus	Michalis Kyriacou	Isle of Man	Matthew Ansell	Happy Valley Ground, Episkopi	Isle of Man by 3 wickets
T20I 1289	7 October	Cyprus	Michalis Kyriacou	Estonia	Marko Vaik	Happy Valley Ground, Episkopi	Cyprus by 79 runs
T20I 1290	8 October	Cyprus	Michalis Kyriacou	Estonia	Marko Vaik	Happy Valley Ground, Episkopi	Cyprus by 39 runs
T20I 1292	8 October	Estonia	Marko Vaik	Isle of Man	Matthew Ansell	Happy Valley Ground, Episkopi	Isle of Man by 8 wickets

=== Namibia in UAE ===
Group stage
No.	Date	Team 1	Captain 1	Team 2	Captain 2	Venue	Result
T20I 1281	5 October	Namibia	Gerhard Erasmus	United Arab Emirates	Ahmed Raza	ICC Academy Ground, Dubai	Namibia by 17 runs
T20I 1293	9 October	Namibia	Gerhard Erasmus	Scotland	Kyle Coetzer	ICC Academy Ground, Dubai	Namibia by 5 wickets
T20I 1295	10 October	Namibia	Gerhard Erasmus	Papua New Guinea	Assad Vala	ICC Academy Ground, Dubai	Namibia by 14 runs

=== 2021 ICC T20 World Cup EAP Qualifier ===
The tournament was cancelled due to COVID-19 pandemic.

=== 2021 ICC T20 World Cup Europe Qualifier ===
Pos	Team	Pld	W	L	NR	Pts	NRR
1	Jersey	6	6	0	0	12	0.752
2	Germany	6	3	3	0	6	0.085
3	Italy	6	3	3	0	6	−0.339
4	Denmark	6	0	6	0	0	−0.503

Source: ESPN Cricinfo

advanced to the global qualifier

Group stage
No.	Date	Team 1	Captain 1	Team 2	Captain 2	Venue	Result
T20I 1296	15 October	Germany	Venkatraman Ganesan	Jersey	Charles Perchard	Desert Springs Cricket Ground, Almería	Jersey by 4 runs
T20I 1297	15 October	Denmark	Frederik Klokker	Italy	Gareth Berg	Desert Springs Cricket Ground, Almería	Italy by 6 wickets
T20I 1300	16 October	Denmark	Frederik Klokker	Germany	Venkatraman Ganesan	Desert Springs Cricket Ground, Almería	Germany by 6 wickets
T20I 1303	16 October	Italy	Gareth Berg	Jersey	Charles Perchard	Desert Springs Cricket Ground, Almería	Jersey by 41 runs
T20I 1306	17 October	Denmark	Frederik Klokker	Jersey	Charles Perchard	Desert Springs Cricket Ground, Almería	Jersey by 5 runs
T20I 1310	17 October	Germany	Venkatraman Ganesan	Italy	Gareth Berg	Desert Springs Cricket Ground, Almería	Germany by 4 wickets
T20I 1316	19 October	Denmark	Amjad Khan	Italy	Gareth Berg	Desert Springs Cricket Ground, Almería	Italy by 9 runs
T20I 1321	19 October	Germany	Venkatraman Ganesan	Jersey	Charles Perchard	Desert Springs Cricket Ground, Almería	Jersey by 4 wickets
T20I 1325	20 October	Italy	Gareth Berg	Jersey	Charles Perchard	Desert Springs Cricket Ground, Almería	Jersey by 8 wickets
T20I 1330	20 October	Denmark	Amjad Khan	Germany	Venkatraman Ganesan	Desert Springs Cricket Ground, Almería	Germany by 12 runs
T20I 1333	21 October	Germany	Venkatraman Ganesan	Italy	Gareth Berg	Desert Springs Cricket Ground, Almería	Italy by 1 run
T20I 1337	21 October	Denmark	Saif Ahmad	Jersey	Charles Perchard	Desert Springs Cricket Ground, Almería	Jersey by 4 wickets

=== 2021 ICC T20 World Cup Africa Qualifier A ===
Pos	Team	Pld	W	L	NR	Pts	NRR
1	Uganda	6	6	0	0	12	4.669
2	Ghana	6	5	1	0	10	2.220
3	Malawi	6	4	2	0	8	0.026
4	Rwanda	6	3	3	0	6	0.516
5	Seychelles	6	2	4	0	4	−2.345
6	Eswatini	6	1	5	0	2	−2.064
7	Lesotho	6	0	6	0	0	−3.830

Source: ESPN Cricinfo

advanced to the regional final

Group stage
No.	Date	Team 1	Captain 1	Team 2	Captain 2	Venue	Result
T20I 1298	16 October	Rwanda	Clinton Rubagumya	Ghana	Obed Harvey	Gahanga International Cricket Stadium, Kigali	Ghana by 5 wickets
T20I 1299	16 October	Eswatini	Naeem Gull	Lesotho	Samir Patel	IPRC Cricket Ground, Kigali	Eswatini by 54 runs
T20I 1301	16 October	Ghana	Obed Harvey	Seychelles	Kaushalkumar Patel	Gahanga International Cricket Stadium, Kigali	Ghana by 9 wickets
T20I 1302	16 October	Malawi	Moazzam Baig	Uganda	Deusdedit Muhumuza	IPRC Cricket Ground, Kigali	Uganda by 10 wickets
T20I 1304	17 October	Lesotho	Samir Patel	Seychelles	Kaushalkumar Patel	Gahanga International Cricket Stadium, Kigali	Seychelles by 6 wickets
T20I 1305	17 October	Eswatini	Naeem Gull	Malawi	Moazzam Baig	IPRC Cricket Ground, Kigali	Malawi by 8 wickets
T20I 1308	17 October	Ghana	Obed Harvey	Lesotho	Samir Patel	Gahanga International Cricket Stadium, Kigali	Ghana by 116 runs
T20I 1309	17 October	Rwanda	Clinton Rubagumya	Uganda	Deusdedit Muhumuza	IPRC Cricket Ground, Kigali	Uganda by 106 runs
T20I 1314	19 October	Ghana	Obed Harvey	Malawi	Moazzam Baig	Gahanga International Cricket Stadium, Kigali	Ghana by 7 wickets
T20I 1315	19 October	Lesotho	Samir Patel	Uganda	Deusdedit Muhumuza	IPRC Cricket Ground, Kigali	Uganda by 10 wickets
T20I 1319	19 October	Rwanda	Clinton Rubagumya	Seychelles	Kaushalkumar Patel	Gahanga International Cricket Stadium, Kigali	Rwanda by 78 runs (DLS)
T20I 1320	19 October	Eswatini	Naeem Gull	Uganda	Deusdedit Muhumuza	IPRC Cricket Ground, Kigali	Uganda by 6 wickets
T20I 1323	20 October	Malawi	Moazzam Baig	Seychelles	Kaushalkumar Patel	Gahanga International Cricket Stadium, Kigali	Malawi by 21 runs
T20I 1324	20 October	Eswatini	Naeem Gull	Ghana	Obed Harvey	IPRC Cricket Ground, Kigali	Ghana by 7 wickets
T20I 1328	20 October	Eswatini	Naeem Gull	Seychelles	Kaushalkumar Patel	Gahanga International Cricket Stadium, Kigali	Seychelles by 7 wickets
T20I 1329	21 October	Rwanda	Clinton Rubagumya	Lesotho	Samir Patel	IPRC Cricket Ground, Kigali	Rwanda by 22 runs
T20I 1332	21 October	Ghana	Obed Harvey	Uganda	Deusdedit Muhumuza	Gahanga International Cricket Stadium, Kigali	Uganda by 79 runs
T20I 1339	22 October	Rwanda	Clinton Rubagumya	Eswatini	Naeem Gull	Gahanga International Cricket Stadium, Kigali	Rwanda by 7 wickets
T20I 1340	22 October	Lesotho	Samir Patel	Malawi	Moazzam Baig	IPRC Cricket Ground, Kigali	Malawi by 22 runs
T20I 1343	22 October	Rwanda	Clinton Rubagumya	Malawi	Moazzam Baig	Gahanga International Cricket Stadium, Kigali	Malawi by 24 runs
T20I 1344	22 October	Seychelles	Kaushalkumar Patel	Uganda	Deusdedit Muhumuza	IPRC Cricket Ground, Kigali	Uganda by 95 runs

=== 2021 ICC Women's T20 World Cup Americas Qualifier ===
Pos	Team	Pld	W	L	NR	Pts	NRR
1	United States	6	5	1	0	10	1.879
2	Brazil	6	4	2	0	8	0.175
3	Canada	6	3	3	0	6	0.652
4	Argentina	6	0	6	0	0	−3.195

Source: ESPN Cricinfo

advanced to the global qualifier

Round-robin
No.	Date	Team 1	Captain 1	Team 2	Captain 2	Venue	Result
WT20I 984	18 October	Brazil	Roberta Moretti Avery	United States	Sindhu Sriharsha	Reforma Athletic Club, Naucalpan	United States by 6 wickets
WT20I 985	18 October	Argentina	Veronica Vasquez	Canada	Kamna Mirchandani	Reforma Athletic Club, Naucalpan	Canada by 72 runs
WT20I 986	19 October	Argentina	Veronica Vasquez	Brazil	Roberta Moretti Avery	Reforma Athletic Club, Naucalpan	Brazil by 8 wickets
WT20I 987	19 October	Canada	Kamna Mirchandani	United States	Sindhu Sriharsha	Reforma Athletic Club, Naucalpan	United States by 10 wickets
WT20I 988	21 October	Argentina	Veronica Vasquez	United States	Sindhu Sriharsha	Reforma Athletic Club, Naucalpan	United States by 56 runs
WT20I 989	21 October	Brazil	Roberta Moretti Avery	Canada	Kamna Mirchandani	Reforma Athletic Club, Naucalpan	Brazil by 5 wickets
WT20I 990	22 October	Argentina	Veronica Vasquez	Canada	Kamna Mirchandani	Reforma Athletic Club, Naucalpan	Canada by 9 wickets
WT20I 991	22 October	Brazil	Roberta Moretti Avery	United States	Sindhu Sriharsha	Reforma Athletic Club, Naucalpan	United States by 43 runs
WT20I 992	24 October	Canada	Kamna Mirchandani	United States	Sindhu Sriharsha	Reforma Athletic Club, Naucalpan	Canada by 8 runs
WT20I 993	24 October	Argentina	Veronica Vasquez	Brazil	Roberta Moretti Avery	Reforma Athletic Club, Naucalpan	Brazil by 14 runs (DLS)
WT20I 994	25 October	Brazil	Roberta Moretti Avery	Canada	Kamna Mirchandani	Reforma Athletic Club, Naucalpan	Brazil by 1 run
WT20I 995	25 October	Argentina	Veronica Vasquez	United States	Sindhu Sriharsha	Reforma Athletic Club, Naucalpan	United States by 10 wickets

=== Sierra Leone in Nigeria ===
T20I series
No.	Date	Home captain	Away captain	Venue	Result
T20I 1317	19 October	Joshua Ayannaike	Lansana Lamin	University of Lagos Cricket Oval, Lagos	Sierra Leone by 6 wickets
T20I 1326	20 October	Joshua Ayannaike	Lansana Lamin	University of Lagos Cricket Oval, Lagos	Nigeria by 6 runs
T20I 1336	21 October	Joshua Ayannaike	Lansana Lamin	University of Lagos Cricket Oval, Lagos	Nigeria by 69 runs
T20I 1349	23 October	Joshua Ayannaike	Lansana Lamin	University of Lagos Cricket Oval, Lagos	Nigeria by 9 wickets
T20I 1360	24 October	Joshua Ayannaike	Lansana Lamin	University of Lagos Cricket Oval, Lagos	Nigeria by 19 runs
T20I 1365	26 October	Joshua Ayannaike	Lansana Lamin	University of Lagos Cricket Oval, Lagos	Nigeria by 36 runs

=== 2021 Valletta Cup and Gibraltar in Malta ===
Team	P	W	L	T	NR	Pts	NRR
Switzerland	3	3	0	0	0	6	+3.067
Malta	3	2	1	0	0	4	+1.379
Gibraltar	3	1	2	0	0	2	–1.274
Bulgaria	3	0	3	0	0	0	–3.662

Group stage
No.	Date	Team 1	Captain 1	Team 2	Captain 2	Venue	Result
T20I 1335	21 October	Malta	Amar Sharma	Gibraltar	Avinash Pai	Marsa Sports Club, Marsa	Malta by 61 runs
T20I 1341	22 October	Gibraltar	Avinash Pai	Switzerland	Anser Mehmood	Marsa Sports Club, Marsa	Switzerland by 9 wickets
T20I 1345	22 October	Bulgaria	Prakash Mishra	Switzerland	Anser Mehmood	Marsa Sports Club, Marsa	Switzerland by 8 wickets
T20I 1347	23 October	Bulgaria	Prakash Mishra	Gibraltar	Avinash Pai	Marsa Sports Club, Marsa	Gibraltar by 37 runs
T20I 1350	23 October	Malta	Bikram Arora	Switzerland	Anser Mehmood	Marsa Sports Club, Marsa	Switzerland by 8 runs
T20I 1353	23 October	Malta	Bikram Arora	Bulgaria	Prakash Mishra	Marsa Sports Club, Marsa	Malta by 6 wickets
Play-offs
No.	Date	Team 1	Captain 1	Team 2	Captain 2	Venue	Result
T20I 1356	24 October	Bulgaria	Prakash Mishra	Gibraltar	Avinash Pai	Marsa Sports Club, Marsa	Bulgaria by 6 wickets
T20I 1359	24 October	Malta	Bikram Arora	Switzerland	Anser Mehmood	Marsa Sports Club, Marsa	Malta by 6 runs

T20I series
No.	Date	Home captain	Away captain	Venue	Result
T20I 1362a	25 October	Bikram Arora	Avinash Pai	Marsa Sports Club, Marsa	Match abandoned
T20I 1363	25 October	Bikram Arora	Avinash Pai	Marsa Sports Club, Marsa	Match tied (DLS)

=== 2021 ICC T20 World Cup Asia Qualifier A ===
Pos	Team	Pld	W	L	NR	Pts	NRR
1	Bahrain	4	3	1	0	6	1.662
2	Qatar	4	3	1	0	6	1.569
3	Kuwait	4	2	2	0	4	0.899
4	Saudi Arabia	4	2	2	0	4	0.303
5	Maldives	4	0	4	0	0	−4.088

Source: ESPN Cricinfo

advanced to the global qualifier

Group stage
No.	Date	Team 1	Captain 1	Team 2	Captain 2	Venue	Result
T20I 1348	23 October	Qatar	Iqbal Hussain	Bahrain	Anasim Khan	West End Park International Cricket Stadium, Doha	Bahrain by 8 wickets
T20I 1352	23 October	Maldives	Mohamed Mahfooz	Saudi Arabia	Abdul Waheed	West End Park International Cricket Stadium, Doha	Saudi Arabia by 7 wickets
T20I 1355	24 October	Bahrain	Anasim Khan	Kuwait	Mohammed Aslam	West End Park International Cricket Stadium, Doha	Kuwait by 6 wickets
T20I 1358	24 October	Qatar	Iqbal Hussain	Maldives	Mohamed Mahfooz	West End Park International Cricket Stadium, Doha	Qatar by 98 runs
T20I 1362	25 October	Kuwait	Mohammed Aslam	Saudi Arabia	Abdul Waheed	West End Park International Cricket Stadium, Doha	Saudi Arabia by 4 wickets
T20I 1368	27 October	Bahrain	Anasim Khan	Maldives	Mohamed Mahfooz	West End Park International Cricket Stadium, Doha	Bahrain by 7 wickets
T20I 1370	27 October	Qatar	Iqbal Hussain	Saudi Arabia	Abdul Waheed	West End Park International Cricket Stadium, Doha	Qatar by 5 wickets
T20I 1372	28 October	Kuwait	Mohammed Aslam	Maldives	Mohamed Mahfooz	West End Park International Cricket Stadium, Doha	Kuwait by 5 wickets
T20I 1373	28 October	Bahrain	Anasim Khan	Saudi Arabia	Abdul Waheed	West End Park International Cricket Stadium, Doha	Bahrain by 18 runs
T20I 1376	29 October	Qatar	Iqbal Hussain	Kuwait	Mohammed Aslam	West End Park International Cricket Stadium, Doha	Qatar by 2 wickets

== November ==
=== 2021 ICC T20 World Cup Africa Qualifier B ===
Pos	Team	Pld	W	L	NR	Pts	NRR
1	Tanzania	4	4	0	0	8	4.592
2	Botswana	4	3	1	0	6	3.021
3	Sierra Leone	4	2	2	0	4	−0.958
4	Mozambique	4	1	3	0	2	0.159
5	Cameroon	4	0	4	0	0	−7.404

Source: ESPN Cricinfo

advanced to the regional final

Group stage
No.	Date	Team 1	Captain 1	Team 2	Captain 2	Venue	Result
T20I 1383	2 November	Botswana	Karabo Motlhanka	Sierra Leone	Lansana Lamin	Gahanga International Cricket Stadium, Kigali	Botswana by 72 runs
T20I 1385	2 November	Mozambique	Filipe Cossa	Tanzania	Abhik Patwa	Gahanga International Cricket Stadium, Kigali	Tanzania by 87 runs
T20I 1387	3 November	Cameroon	Faustin Mpegna	Mozambique	Filipe Cossa	Gahanga International Cricket Stadium, Kigali	Mozambique by 171 runs
T20I 1389	3 November	Sierra Leone	Lansana Lamin	Tanzania	Abhik Patwa	Gahanga International Cricket Stadium, Kigali	Tanzania by 8 wickets
T20I 1393	5 November	Botswana	Karabo Motlhanka	Cameroon	Faustin Mpegna	Gahanga International Cricket Stadium, Kigali	Botswana by 9 wickets
T20I 1395	5 November	Mozambique	Filipe Cossa	Sierra Leone	Lansana Lamin	Gahanga International Cricket Stadium, Kigali	Sierra Leone by 5 wickets
T20I 1397	6 November	Botswana	Karabo Motlhanka	Mozambique	Filipe Cossa	Gahanga International Cricket Stadium, Kigali	Botswana by 52 runs
T20I 1399	6 November	Cameroon	Faustin Mpegna	Tanzania	Abhik Patwa	Gahanga International Cricket Stadium, Kigali	Tanzania by 178 runs
T20I 1401	7 November	Cameroon	Faustin Mpegna	Sierra Leone	Lansana Lamin	Gahanga International Cricket Stadium, Kigali	Sierra Leone by 6 wickets
T20I 1403	7 November	Botswana	Karabo Motlhanka	Tanzania	Abhik Patwa	Gahanga International Cricket Stadium, Kigali	Tanzania by 3 runs

=== 2021 ICC T20 World Cup Americas Qualifier ===
Pos	Team	Pld	W	L	NR	Pts	NRR
1	United States	6	6	0	0	12	3.077
2	Canada	6	5	1	0	10	5.312
3	Bermuda	6	4	2	0	8	2.645
4	Argentina	6	2	4	0	4	−0.331
5	Bahamas	6	2	4	0	4	−2.744
6	Panama	6	1	5	0	2	−3.477
7	Belize	6	1	5	0	2	−3.863

Source: ESPN Cricinfo, CricClubs

advanced to the global qualifier

Group stage
No.	Date	Team 1	Captain 1	Team 2	Captain 2	Venue	Result
T20I 1404	7 November	Belize	Kenton Young	United States	Monank Patel	Coolidge Cricket Ground, Antigua	United States by 10 wickets
T20I 1405	7 November	Bahamas	Gregory Taylor	Canada	Navneet Dhaliwal	Sir Vivian Richards Stadium, Antigua	Canada by 122 runs
T20I 1407	7 November	Panama	Yusuf Ebrahim	United States	Monank Patel	Coolidge Cricket Ground, Antigua	United States by 9 wickets
T20I 1408	8 November	Belize	Kenton Young	Canada	Navneet Dhaliwal	Coolidge Cricket Ground, Antigua	Canada by 145 runs
T20I 1409	8 November	Argentina	Hernán Fennell	Bahamas	Gregory Taylor	Sir Vivian Richards Stadium, Antigua	Bahamas by 12 runs
T20I 1411	8 November	Belize	Kenton Young	Panama	Yusuf Ebrahim	Coolidge Cricket Ground, Antigua	Belize by 12 runs
T20I 1412	8 November	Bermuda	Kamau Leverock	United States	Monank Patel	Sir Vivian Richards Stadium, Antigua	United States by 23 runs
T20I 1413	10 November	Bahamas	Gregory Taylor	Bermuda	Kamau Leverock	Coolidge Cricket Ground, Antigua	Bermuda by 140 runs
T20I 1414	10 November	Argentina	Hernán Fennell	Belize	Kenton Young	Sir Vivian Richards Stadium, Antigua	Argentina by 59 runs
T20I 1416	10 November	Canada	Navneet Dhaliwal	United States	Monank Patel	Coolidge Cricket Ground, Antigua	Match tied (United States won S/O)
T20I 1417	10 November	Argentina	Hernán Fennell	Panama	Yusuf Ebrahim	Sir Vivian Richards Stadium, Antigua	Argentina by 45 runs
T20I 1418	11 November	Bermuda	Kamau Leverock	Canada	Navneet Dhaliwal	Coolidge Cricket Ground, Antigua	Canada by 50 runs
T20I 1419	11 November	Bahamas	Gregory Taylor	Belize	Kenton Young	Sir Vivian Richards Stadium, Antigua	Bahamas by 11 runs
T20I 1421	11 November	Bermuda	Kamau Leverock	Panama	Yusuf Ebrahim	Coolidge Cricket Ground, Antigua	Bermuda by 86 runs
T20I 1422	11 November	Argentina	Hernán Fennell	United States	Monank Patel	Sir Vivian Richards Stadium, Antigua	United States by 8 wickets
T20I 1423	13 November	Bahamas	Gregory Taylor	United States	Monank Patel	Coolidge Cricket Ground, Antigua	United States by 10 wickets
T20I 1424	13 November	Belize	Kenton Young	Bermuda	Kamau Leverock	Sir Vivian Richards Stadium, Antigua	Bermuda by 7 wickets
T20I 1425	13 November	Bahamas	Gregory Taylor	Panama	Yusuf Ebrahim	Coolidge Cricket Ground, Antigua	Panama by 26 runs
T20I 1426	13 November	Argentina	Hernán Fennell	Canada	Navneet Dhaliwal	Sir Vivian Richards Stadium, Antigua	Canada by 9 wickets
T20I 1427	14 November	Canada	Navneet Dhaliwal	Panama	Yusuf Ebrahim	Coolidge Cricket Ground, Antigua	Canada by 208 runs
T20I 1429	14 November	Argentina	Hernán Fennell	Bermuda	Kamau Leverock	Coolidge Cricket Ground, Antigua	Bermuda by 3 wickets

=== 2021 ICC Men's T20 World Cup Asia Qualifier Group B ===
The tournament was cancelled due to COVID-19 pandemic.

=== Nepal women in Qatar ===
WT20I series
No.	Date	Home captain	Away captain	Venue	Result
WT20I 996	16 November	Aysha	Rubina Chhetry	West End Park International Cricket Stadium, Doha	Nepal by 119 runs
WT20I 997	17 November	Aysha	Rubina Chhetry	West End Park International Cricket Stadium, Doha	Nepal by 61 runs
WT20I 998	18 November	Aysha	Rubina Chhetry	West End Park International Cricket Stadium, Doha	Nepal by 109 runs

=== 2021 ICC T20 World Cup Africa Qualifier Final ===
Pos	Team	Pld	W	L	NR	Pts	NRR
1	Uganda	6	5	1	0	10	1.024
2	Kenya	6	4	2	0	8	1.002
3	Tanzania	6	3	3	0	6	0.523
4	Nigeria	6	0	6	0	0	−2.610

Source: ESPN Cricinfo

advanced to the global qualifier

Group stage
No.	Date	Team 1	Captain 1	Team 2	Captain 2	Venue	Result
T20I 1430	17 November	Nigeria	Sylvester Okpe	Tanzania	Abhik Patwa	Gahanga International Cricket Stadium, Kigali	Tanzania by 6 wickets
T20I 1431	17 November	Kenya	Shem Ngoche	Uganda	Brian Masaba	IPRC Cricket Ground, Kigali	Kenya by 1 run
T20I 1432	17 November	Nigeria	Sylvester Okpe	Uganda	Brian Masaba	Gahanga International Cricket Stadium, Kigali	Uganda by 12 runs (DLS)
T20I 1433	17 November	Kenya	Shem Ngoche	Tanzania	Abhik Patwa	IPRC Cricket Ground, Kigali	Tanzania by 49 runs
T20I 1435	18 November	Tanzania	Abhik Patwa	Uganda	Brian Masaba	Gahanga International Cricket Stadium, Kigali	Uganda by 8 wickets
T20I 1436	18 November	Kenya	Shem Ngoche	Nigeria	Ademola Onikoyi	IPRC Cricket Ground, Kigali	Kenya by 8 wickets
T20I 1437	18 November	Kenya	Shem Ngoche	Tanzania	Abhik Patwa	Gahanga International Cricket Stadium, Kigali	Kenya by 7 wickets
T20I 1438	18 November	Nigeria	Ademola Onikoyi	Uganda	Brian Masaba	IPRC Cricket Ground, Kigali	Uganda by 8 wickets
T20I 1441	20 November	Tanzania	Abhik Patwa	Uganda	Brian Masaba	Gahanga International Cricket Stadium, Kigali	Uganda by 6 wickets
T20I 1442	20 November	Kenya	Shem Ngoche	Nigeria	Ademola Onikoyi	IPRC Cricket Ground, Kigali	Kenya by 60 runs
T20I 1444	20 November	Kenya	Shem Ngoche	Uganda	Brian Masaba	Gahanga International Cricket Stadium, Kigali	Uganda by 6 wickets (DLS)
T20I 1445	20 November	Nigeria	Joshua Ayannaike	Tanzania	Abhik Patwa	IPRC Cricket Ground, Kigali	Tanzania by 69 runs

=== 2021 ICC Women's T20 World Cup Asia Qualifier ===
Pos	Team	Pld	W	L	NR	Pts	NRR
1	United Arab Emirates	5	5	0	0	10	2.366
2	Hong Kong	5	4	1	0	8	0.726
3	Nepal	5	3	2	0	6	1.028
4	Malaysia	5	2	3	0	4	0.399
5	Bhutan	5	1	4	0	2	−1.038
6	Kuwait	5	0	5	0	0	−3.928

Source: ESPN Cricinfo

advanced to the global qualifier

Round-robin
No.	Date	Team 1	Captain 1	Team 2	Captain 2	Venue	Result
WT20I 999	22 November	United Arab Emirates	Chaya Mughal	Malaysia	Winifred Duraisingam	ICC Academy Ground, Dubai	United Arab Emirates by 30 runs
WT20I 1000	22 November	Hong Kong	Kary Chan	Nepal	Rubina Chhetry	ICC Academy Ground 2, Dubai	Hong Kong by 6 wickets
WT20I 1001	22 November	Bhutan	Yeshey Choden	Kuwait	Amna Tariq	ICC Academy Ground, Dubai	Bhutan by 40 runs
WT20I 1002	23 November	United Arab Emirates	Chaya Mughal	Hong Kong	Kary Chan	ICC Academy Ground, Dubai	United Arab Emirates by 11 runs
WT20I 1003	23 November	Kuwait	Amna Tariq	Malaysia	Winifred Duraisingam	ICC Academy Ground, Dubai	Malaysia by 81 runs
WT20I 1004	23 November	Bhutan	Yeshey Choden	Nepal	Rubina Chhetry	ICC Academy Ground 2, Dubai	Nepal by 8 wickets
WT20I 1005	25 November	Hong Kong	Kary Chan	Malaysia	Winifred Duraisingam	ICC Academy Ground 2, Dubai	Hong Kong by 4 wickets
WT20I 1006	25 November	Kuwait	Amna Tariq	Nepal	Rubina Chhetry	ICC Academy Ground, Dubai	Nepal by 9 wickets
WT20I 1007	25 November	United Arab Emirates	Chaya Mughal	Bhutan	Yeshey Choden	ICC Academy Ground 2, Dubai	United Arab Emirates by 47 runs
WT20I 1008	26 November	Malaysia	Winifred Duraisingam	Nepal	Rubina Chhetry	ICC Academy Ground, Dubai	Nepal by 6 wickets
WT20I 1009	26 November	Bhutan	Yeshey Choden	Hong Kong	Kary Chan	ICC Academy Ground, Dubai	Hong Kong by 20 runs
WT20I 1010	26 November	United Arab Emirates	Chaya Mughal	Kuwait	Amna Tariq	ICC Academy Ground 2, Dubai	United Arab Emirates by 7 wickets
WT20I 1011	28 November	United Arab Emirates	Chaya Mughal	Nepal	Rubina Chhetry	ICC Academy Ground 2, Dubai	United Arab Emirates by 48 runs
WT20I 1012	28 November	Bhutan	Yeshey Choden	Malaysia	Winifred Duraisingam	ICC Academy Ground, Dubai	Malaysia by 11 runs
WT20I 1013	28 November	Hong Kong	Kary Chan	Kuwait	Amna Tariq	ICC Academy Ground, Dubai	Hong Kong by 35 runs

== January ==
=== 2022 Commonwealth Games Qualifier ===
Pos	Team	Pld	W	L	NR	Pts	NRR
1	Sri Lanka	4	4	0	0	8	3.924
2	Bangladesh	4	3	1	0	6	2.005
3	Scotland	4	2	2	0	4	−1.393
4	Malaysia	4	1	3	0	2	−2.521
5	Kenya	4	0	4	0	0	−2.651

Source: ESPN Cricinfo

Round-robin
No.	Date	Team 1	Captain 1	Team 2	Captain 2	Venue	Result
WT20I 1014	18 January	Malaysia	Winifred Duraisingam	Bangladesh	Nigar Sultana	Kinrara Academy Oval, Kuala Lumpur	Bangladesh by 8 wickets
WT20I 1015	18 January	Scotland	Kathryn Bryce	Sri Lanka	Chamari Athapaththu	Kinrara Academy Oval, Kuala Lumpur	Sri Lanka by 109 runs
WT20I 1016	19 January	Bangladesh	Nigar Sultana	Kenya	Margaret Ngoche	Kinrara Academy Oval, Kuala Lumpur	Bangladesh by 80 runs
WT20I 1017	19 January	Malaysia	Winifred Duraisingam	Scotland	Kathryn Bryce	Kinrara Academy Oval, Kuala Lumpur	Scotland by 31 runs
WT20I 1018	20 January	Kenya	Margaret Ngoche	Sri Lanka	Chamari Athapaththu	Kinrara Academy Oval, Kuala Lumpur	Sri Lanka by 9 wickets
WT20I 1020	22 January	Kenya	Margaret Ngoche	Scotland	Kathryn Bryce	Kinrara Academy Oval, Kuala Lumpur	Scotland by 16 runs
WT20I 1021	22 January	Malaysia	Winifred Duraisingam	Sri Lanka	Chamari Athapaththu	Kinrara Academy Oval, Kuala Lumpur	Sri Lanka by 93 runs
WT20I 1023	23 January	Bangladesh	Nigar Sultana	Scotland	Kathryn Bryce	Kinrara Academy Oval, Kuala Lumpur	Bangladesh by 9 wickets
WT20I 1024	23 January	Malaysia	Winifred Duraisingam	Kenya	Margaret Ngoche	Kinrara Academy Oval, Kuala Lumpur	Malaysia by 5 wickets
WT20I 1025	24 January	Bangladesh	Nigar Sultana	Sri Lanka	Chamari Athapaththu	Kinrara Academy Oval, Kuala Lumpur	Sri Lanka by 22 runs

== February ==
=== 2021–22 Oman Quadrangular Series ===
Pos	Team	Pld	W	L	NR	Pts	NRR
1	United Arab Emirates	3	2	1	0	4	0.547
2	Ireland	3	2	1	0	4	0.457
3	Oman	3	1	2	0	2	−0.438
4	Nepal	3	1	2	0	2	−0.592

Source: ESPN Cricinfo

Round-robin
No.	Date	Team 1	Captain 1	Team 2	Captain 2	Venue	Result
T20I 1459	11 February	Oman	Zeeshan Maqsood	Nepal	Sandeep Lamichhane	Oman Cricket Academy Ground Turf 1, Muscat	Nepal by 6 wickets
T20I 1460	12 February	Nepal	Sandeep Lamichhane	United Arab Emirates	Ahmed Raza	Oman Cricket Academy Ground Turf 1, Muscat	United Arab Emirates by 25 runs
T20I 1461	12 February	Oman	Zeeshan Maqsood	Ireland	Andrew Balbirnie	Oman Cricket Academy Ground Turf 1, Muscat	Ireland by 9 wickets
T20I 1462	13 February	Ireland	Andrew Balbirnie	United Arab Emirates	Ahmed Raza	Oman Cricket Academy Ground Turf 1, Muscat	United Arab Emirates by 13 runs
T20I 1464	14 February	Oman	Khawar Ali	United Arab Emirates	Ahmed Raza	Oman Cricket Academy Ground Turf 1, Muscat	Oman by 7 wickets
T20I 1465	14 February	Ireland	Andrew Balbirnie	Nepal	Sandeep Lamichhane	Oman Cricket Academy Ground Turf 1, Muscat	Ireland by 16 runs

=== 2022 ICC T20 World Cup Global Qualifier A ===
Pos	Team	Pld	W	L	NR	Pts	NRR
1	Ireland	3	2	1	0	4	0.991
2	United Arab Emirates	3	2	1	0	4	0.667
3	Bahrain	3	2	1	0	4	0.240
4	Germany	3	0	3	0	0	−2.042

Source: ESPN Cricinfo

Advanced to the semi-finals
Advanced to the consolation play-offs

Pos	Team	Pld	W	L	NR	Pts	NRR
1	Nepal	3	3	0	0	6	3.680
2	Oman	3	2	1	0	4	1.650
3	Canada	3	1	2	0	2	1.037
4	Philippines	3	0	3	0	0	−7.466

Source: ESPN Cricinfo

Group stage
No.	Date	Team 1	Captain 1	Team 2	Captain 2	Venue	Result
T20I 1468	18 February	Canada	Navneet Dhaliwal	Philippines	Jonathan Hill	Oman Cricket Academy Ground Turf 2, Muscat	Canada by 118 runs
T20I 1469	18 February	Oman	Zeeshan Maqsood	Nepal	Sandeep Lamichhane	Oman Cricket Academy Ground Turf 1, Muscat	Nepal by 39 runs
T20I 1471	18 February	Bahrain	Sarfaraz Ali	Germany	Venkatraman Ganesan	Oman Cricket Academy Ground Turf 2, Muscat	Bahrain by 6 wickets
T20I 1472	18 February	Ireland	Andrew Balbirnie	United Arab Emirates	Ahmed Raza	Oman Cricket Academy Ground Turf 1, Muscat	United Arab Emirates by 18 runs
T20I 1474	19 February	Nepal	Sandeep Lamichhane	Philippines	Jonathan Hill	Oman Cricket Academy Ground Turf 2, Muscat	Nepal by 136 runs
T20I 1475	19 February	Oman	Zeeshan Maqsood	Canada	Navneet Dhaliwal	Oman Cricket Academy Ground Turf 1, Muscat	Oman by 9 wickets
T20I 1476	19 February	Bahrain	Sarfaraz Ali	Ireland	Andrew Balbirnie	Oman Cricket Academy Ground Turf 2, Muscat	Ireland by 21 runs
T20I 1477	19 February	Germany	Venkatraman Ganesan	United Arab Emirates	Ahmed Raza	Oman Cricket Academy Ground Turf 1, Muscat	United Arab Emirates by 24 runs
T20I 1480	21 February	Bahrain	Sarfaraz Ali	United Arab Emirates	Ahmed Raza	Oman Cricket Academy Ground Turf 2, Muscat	Bahrain by 2 runs
T20I 1481	21 February	Germany	Venkatraman Ganesan	Ireland	Andrew Balbirnie	Oman Cricket Academy Ground Turf 1, Muscat	Ireland by 7 wickets
T20I 1482	21 February	Canada	Navneet Dhaliwal	Nepal	Sandeep Lamichhane	Oman Cricket Academy Ground Turf 1, Muscat	Nepal by 8 wickets
T20I 1483	21 February	Oman	Zeeshan Maqsood	Philippines	Daniel Smith	Oman Cricket Academy Ground Turf 2, Muscat	Oman by 9 wickets
Play-offs
No.	Date	Team 1	Captain 1	Team 2	Captain 2	Venue	Result
T20I 1484	22 February	Bahrain	Sarfaraz Ali	Philippines	Jonathan Hill	Oman Cricket Academy Ground Turf 2, Muscat	Bahrain by 91 runs
T20I 1485	22 February	Canada	Navneet Dhaliwal	Germany	Venkatraman Ganesan	Oman Cricket Academy Ground Turf 1, Muscat	Canada by 6 wickets
T20I 1486	22 February	Nepal	Sandeep Lamichhane	United Arab Emirates	Ahmed Raza	Oman Cricket Academy Ground Turf 1, Muscat	United Arab Emirates by 68 runs
T20I 1487	22 February	Ireland	Andrew Balbirnie	Oman	Zeeshan Maqsood	Oman Cricket Academy Ground Turf 2, Muscat	Ireland by 56 runs
T20I 1489	24 February	Germany	Michael Richardson	Philippines	Jonathan Hill	Oman Cricket Academy Ground Turf 2, Muscat	Germany by 9 wickets
T20I 1488	24 February	Bahrain	Sarfaraz Ali	Canada	Navneet Dhaliwal	Oman Cricket Academy Ground Turf 1, Muscat	Canada by 7 wickets
T20I 1491	24 February	Nepal	Sandeep Lamichhane	Oman	Zeeshan Maqsood	Oman Cricket Academy Ground Turf 2, Muscat	Nepal by 9 wickets
T20I 1490	24 February	Ireland	Andrew Balbirnie	United Arab Emirates	Ahmed Raza	Oman Cricket Academy Ground Turf 1, Muscat	United Arab Emirates by 7 wickets

== March ==
=== 2022 GCC Women's Gulf Cup ===
Pos	Team	Pld	W	L	NR	Pts	NRR
1	United Arab Emirates	5	5	0	0	10	7.066
2	Oman	5	4	1	0	8	2.180
3	Qatar	5	2	3	0	4	1.663
4	Kuwait	5	2	3	0	4	−0.016
5	Bahrain	5	2	3	0	4	−0.300
6	Saudi Arabia	5	0	5	0	0	−12.108

Source: ESPN Cricinfo

Round-robin
No.	Date	Team 1	Captain 1	Team 2	Captain 2	Venue	Result
WT20I 1027	20 March	Oman	Vaishali Jesrani	Bahrain	Tharanga Gajanayake	Oman Cricket Academy Ground Turf 2, Muscat	Oman by 96 runs
WT20I 1028	20 March	Qatar	Aysha	United Arab Emirates	Chaya Mughal	Oman Cricket Academy Ground Turf 2, Muscat	United Arab Emirates by 8 wickets
WT20I 1029	20 March	Kuwait	Amna Tariq	Saudi Arabia	Cheryl Sewsunker	Oman Cricket Academy Ground Turf 2, Muscat	Kuwait by 10 wickets
WT20I 1030	21 March	Bahrain	Tharanga Gajanayake	Qatar	Aysha	Oman Cricket Academy Ground Turf 2, Muscat	Qatar by 4 runs
WT20I 1031	21 March	Oman	Fiza	Saudi Arabia	Cheryl Sewsunker	Oman Cricket Academy Ground Turf 2, Muscat	Oman by 182 runs
WT20I 1032	21 March	Kuwait	Amna Tariq	United Arab Emirates	Chaya Mughal	Oman Cricket Academy Ground Turf 2, Muscat	United Arab Emirates by 73 runs
WT20I 1033	22 March	Bahrain	Tharanga Gajanayake	Saudi Arabia	Cheryl Sewsunker	Oman Cricket Academy Ground Turf 2, Muscat	Bahrain by 269 runs
WT20I 1034	22 March	Kuwait	Amna Tariq	Qatar	Aysha	Oman Cricket Academy Ground Turf 2, Muscat	Kuwait by 9 wickets
WT20I 1035	22 March	Oman	Vaishali Jesrani	United Arab Emirates	Chaya Mughal	Oman Cricket Academy Ground Turf 2, Muscat	United Arab Emirates by 109 runs
WT20I 1036	24 March	Oman	Vaishali Jesrani	Kuwait	Amna Tariq	Oman Cricket Academy Ground Turf 1, Muscat	Oman by 47 runs
WT20I 1037	24 March	Saudi Arabia	Cheryl Sewsunker	United Arab Emirates	Chaya Mughal	Oman Cricket Academy Ground Turf 2, Muscat	United Arab Emirates by 10 wickets
WT20I 1038	25 March	Qatar	Aysha	Saudi Arabia	Cheryl Sewsunker	Oman Cricket Academy Ground Turf 1, Muscat	Qatar by 256 runs
WT20I 1039	25 March	Bahrain	Tharanga Gajanayake	Kuwait	Amna Tariq	Oman Cricket Academy Ground Turf 2, Muscat	Bahrain by 6 wickets
WT20I 1040	26 March	Oman	Vaishali Jesrani	Qatar	Aysha	Oman Cricket Academy Ground Turf 1, Muscat	Oman by 2 runs
WT20I 1041	26 March	Bahrain	Tharanga Gajanayake	United Arab Emirates	Chaya Mughal	Oman Cricket Academy Ground Turf 2, Muscat	United Arab Emirates by 210 runs

=== 2021–22 Nepal T20I Tri-Nation Series ===
Pos	Team	Pld	W	L	NR	Pts	NRR
1	Nepal	4	4	0	0	8	2.530
2	Papua New Guinea	4	1	3	0	2	−0.467
3	Malaysia	4	1	3	0	2	−2.094

Source: ESPN Cricinfo

Round-robin
No.	Date	Team 1	Captain 1	Team 2	Captain 2	Venue	Result
T20I 1497	28 March	Nepal	Sandeep Lamichhane	Papua New Guinea	Assad Vala	Tribhuvan University International Cricket Ground, Kirtipur	Nepal by 15 runs
T20I 1498	29 March	Malaysia	Ahmad Faiz	Papua New Guinea	Assad Vala	Tribhuvan University International Cricket Ground, Kirtipur	Malaysia by 8 runs
T20I 1499	30 March	Nepal	Sandeep Lamichhane	Malaysia	Ahmad Faiz	Tribhuvan University International Cricket Ground, Kirtipur	Nepal by 6 wickets
T20I 1500	31 March	Nepal	Sandeep Lamichhane	Papua New Guinea	Assad Vala	Tribhuvan University International Cricket Ground, Kirtipur	Nepal by 37 runs
T20I 1501	1 April	Malaysia	Ahmad Faiz	Papua New Guinea	Assad Vala	Tribhuvan University International Cricket Ground, Kirtipur	Papua New Guinea by 8 wickets
T20I 1502	2 April	Nepal	Sandeep Lamichhane	Malaysia	Ahmad Faiz	Tribhuvan University International Cricket Ground, Kirtipur	Nepal by 85 runs
Final
No.	Date	Team 1	Captain 1	Team 2	Captain 2	Venue	Result
T20I 1503	4 April	Nepal	Sandeep Lamichhane	Papua New Guinea	Assad Vala	Tribhuvan University International Cricket Ground, Kirtipur	Nepal by 50 runs

=== 2022 Nigeria Invitational Women's T20I Tournament ===
Pos	Team	Pld	W	L	NR	Pts	NRR
1	Nigeria	4	4	0	0	8	2.862
2	Rwanda	4	3	1	0	6	2.989
3	Sierra Leone	4	2	2	0	4	0.903
4	Ghana	4	1	3	0	2	−1.495
5	Gambia	4	0	4	0	0	−6.352

Source: ESPN Cricinfo

Round-robin
No.	Date	Team 1	Captain 1	Team 2	Captain 2	Venue	Result
WT20I 1042	28 March	Ghana	Rhyda Ofori	Rwanda	Marie Bimenyimana	Tafawa Balewa Square Cricket Oval, Lagos	Rwanda by 81 runs
WT20I 1043	28 March	Nigeria	Blessing Etim	Sierra Leone	Aminata Kamara	Tafawa Balewa Square Cricket Oval, Lagos	Nigeria by 41 runs
WT20I 1044	29 March	Nigeria	Blessing Etim	Gambia	Fatou Faye	Tafawa Balewa Square Cricket Oval, Lagos	Nigeria by 10 wickets
WT20I 1045	29 March	Ghana	Rhyda Ofori	Sierra Leone	Aminata Kamara	Tafawa Balewa Square Cricket Oval, Lagos	Sierra Leone by 87 runs
WT20I 1046	30 March	Rwanda	Marie Bimenyimana	Sierra Leone	Aminata Kamara	Tafawa Balewa Square Cricket Oval, Lagos	Rwanda by 9 wickets
WT20I 1047	30 March	Gambia	Fatou Faye	Ghana	Rozabel Asumadu	Tafawa Balewa Square Cricket Oval, Lagos	Ghana by 106 runs
WT20I 1048	1 April	Nigeria	Blessing Etim	Ghana	Rhyda Ofori	Tafawa Balewa Square Cricket Oval, Lagos	Nigeria by 9 wickets
WT20I 1049	1 April	Gambia	Fatou Faye	Rwanda	Marie Bimenyimana	Tafawa Balewa Square Cricket Oval, Lagos	Rwanda by 10 wickets
WT20I 1050	2 April	Gambia	Maimuna Sano	Sierra Leone	Aminata Kamara	Tafawa Balewa Square Cricket Oval, Lagos	Sierra Leone by 53 runs
WT20I 1051	2 April	Nigeria	Omonye Asika	Rwanda	Marie Bimenyimana	Tafawa Balewa Square Cricket Oval, Lagos	Nigeria by 3 runs
Play-offs
No.	Date	Team 1	Captain 1	Team 2	Captain 2	Venue	Result
WT20I 1052	3 April	Ghana	Rhyda Ofori	Sierra Leone	Aminata Kamara	Tafawa Balewa Square Cricket Oval, Lagos	Sierra Leone by 10 wickets
WT20I 1053	3 April	Nigeria	Blessing Etim	Rwanda	Marie Bimenyimana	Tafawa Balewa Square Cricket Oval, Lagos	Rwanda by 53 runs

== April ==
=== Uganda in Namibia ===
T20I series
No.	Date	Home captain	Away captain	Venue	Result
T20I 1505	8 April	Gerhard Erasmus	Brian Masaba	United Ground, Windhoek	Namibia by 8 wickets
T20I 1506	9 April	Gerhard Erasmus	Brian Masaba	United Ground, Windhoek	Uganda by 7 wickets
T20I 1507	10 April	Gerhard Erasmus	Brian Masaba	United Ground, Windhoek	Namibia by 52 runs

=== Bahamas in the Cayman Islands ===
T20I series
No.	Date	Home captain	Away captain	Venue	Result
T20I 1508	13 April	Ramon Sealy	Marc Taylor	Jimmy Powell Oval, George Town	Cayman Islands by 8 wickets
T20I 1509	14 April	Ramon Sealy	Marc Taylor	Jimmy Powell Oval, George Town	Cayman Islands by 15 runs
T20I 1510	16 April	Ramon Sealy	Marc Taylor	Smith Road Oval, George Town	Cayman Islands by 7 wickets
T20I 1511	16 April	Ramon Sealy	Marc Taylor	Smith Road Oval, George Town	Cayman Islands by 65 runs
T20I 1512	17 April	Ramon Sealy	Marc Taylor	Smith Road Oval, George Town	Cayman Islands by 42 runs

=== 2022 Capricorn Women's Tri-Series ===
Pos	Team	Pld	W	L	NR	Pts	NRR
1	Zimbabwe	6	5	1	0	10	1.593
2	Namibia	6	4	2	0	8	−0.754
3	Uganda	6	0	6	0	0	−0.732

Source: ESPN Cricinfo

Advanced to the final

Round-robin
No.	Date	Team 1	Captain 1	Team 2	Captain 2	Venue	Result
WT20I 1054	20 April	Namibia	Irene van Zyl	Zimbabwe	Mary-Anne Musonda	Trans Namib Ground, Windhoek	Namibia by 7 wickets
WT20I 1055	21 April	Namibia	Irene van Zyl	Uganda	Concy Aweko	Trans Namib Ground, Windhoek	Namibia by 12 runs
WT20I 1056	21 April	Uganda	Concy Aweko	Zimbabwe	Mary-Anne Musonda	Trans Namib Ground, Windhoek	Zimbabwe by 8 runs
WT20I 1057	22 April	Uganda	Concy Aweko	Zimbabwe	Mary-Anne Musonda	Trans Namib Ground, Windhoek	Zimbabwe by 22 runs
WT20I 1058	23 April	Namibia	Irene van Zyl	Zimbabwe	Mary-Anne Musonda	Trans Namib Ground, Windhoek	Zimbabwe by 9 wickets
WT20I 1059	23 April	Namibia	Irene van Zyl	Uganda	Concy Aweko	Trans Namib Ground, Windhoek	Namibia by 28 runs
WT20I 1060	24 April	Uganda	Concy Aweko	Zimbabwe	Josephine Nkomo	Trans Namib Ground, Windhoek	Zimbabwe by 11 runs
WT20I 1061	24 April	Namibia	Irene van Zyl	Zimbabwe	Mary-Anne Musonda	Trans Namib Ground, Windhoek	Zimbabwe by 67 runs
WT20I 1062	25 April	Namibia	Irene van Zyl	Uganda	Concy Aweko	Trans Namib Ground, Windhoek	Namibia by 5 wickets
Final
No.	Date	Team 1	Captain 1	Team 2	Captain 2	Venue	Result
WT20I 1063	26 April	Namibia	Irene van Zyl	Zimbabwe	Mary-Anne Musonda	Trans Namib Ground, Windhoek	Zimbabwe by 7 wickets

=== Hong Kong women in the UAE ===
WT20I series
No.	Date	Home captain	Away captain	Venue	Result
WT20I 1064	27 April	Chaya Mughal	Kary Chan	Malek Cricket Ground, Ajman	United Arab Emirates by 7 wickets
WT20I 1065	28 April	Chaya Mughal	Kary Chan	Malek Cricket Ground, Ajman	United Arab Emirates by 28 runs
WT20I 1066	29 April	Chaya Mughal	Kary Chan	Malek Cricket Ground, Ajman	United Arab Emirates by 26 runs
WT20I 1067	30 April	Chaya Mughal	Kary Chan	Malek Cricket Ground, Ajman	United Arab Emirates by 9 wickets

== See also ==
- International cricket in 2021–22
