= Joshua Ayannaike =

Nigerian cricketer

Personal information
- Full name: Abiola Joshua Ayannaike
- Born: 10 May 1993 (age 33); Lagos, Nigeria
- Batting: Right-handed
- Role: Wicket-keeper batsman

International information
- National side: Nigeria
- T20I debut (cap 4): 20 May 2019 v Kenya
- Last T20I: 20 November 2021 v Tanzania
- Source: ESPNcricinfo, 20 November 2021

Abiola Joshua Ayannaike (born 10 May 1993) is a Nigerian cricketer, who plays as a wicket-keeper batsman. He is the current captain of the Nigeria cricket team.

== Career ==
Ayannaike played in the 2016 ICC World Cricket League Division Five tournament, playing in all six matches for Nigeria, scoring 58 runs.

In April 2018, he was part of Nigeria's squad in the North-Western group of the 2018–19 ICC World Twenty20 Africa Qualifier tournament. In September 2018, he was named in Nigeria's squad for the 2018 Africa T20 Cup. He made his Twenty20 debut for Nigeria in the 2018 Africa T20 Cup on 14 September 2018. He was the leading run-scorer for Nigeria in the tournament, with 75 runs in four matches.

In May 2019, he was named in Nigeria's squad for the Regional Finals of the 2018–19 ICC T20 World Cup Africa Qualifier tournament in Uganda. He made his Twenty20 International (T20I) debut for Nigeria against Kenya on 20 May 2019.

In October 2021, he was named in Nigeria's squad for the Regional Final of the 2021 ICC Men's T20 World Cup Africa Qualifier tournament in Rwanda.
