= Sunrise Sports Club =

Cricket ground in Harare, Zimbabwe

- Interactive map of Sunrise Sports Club

Ground information
- Location: Harare
- Country: Zimbabwe
- Coordinates: 17.8438°S 31.0168°E
- Establishment: 1998 (first recorded match)

International information
- Only women's ODI: 27 November 2021: Zimbabwe v Pakistan

Team information
Mashonaland	(1998/99)
- As of 17 February 2013; Source: Ground profile

Sunrise Sports Club is a cricket ground in Harare, Zimbabwe. The ground is bordered to the north and east by housing and to the west and south by open ground. First-class cricket was first played there in August 1998 when the Zimbabwe Cricket Union President's XI played the South Africa Academy, resulting in a six wicket victory for the President's XI. In October of that same year the ground held a second first-class fixture, with the President's XI playing the touring Indians, which the tourists won by an innings and 71 runs. The ground was scheduled to host a first-class match the following season in the 1998–99 Logan Cup between Mashonaland and Mashonaland A, however the match was abandoned without a ball bowled. India later played a one-day warm-up match at the ground against Zimbabwe A during their 2001 tour.

== See also ==
- List of cricket grounds in Zimbabwe
