= England women's cricket team in Pakistan in 2021–22 =

International cricket tour

	Pakistan women	England women
- Dates: 10 – 22 October 2021

One Day International series

Twenty20 International series

The England women's cricket team were scheduled to play against Pakistan women's cricket team in October 2021 to play three Women's One Day International (WODI) and two Women's Twenty20 International (WT20I) matches. All of the matches were scheduled to be played at Rawalpindi. It would have been the first time that the England women's team had toured Pakistan. The WT20I fixtures were scheduled to be played as double-header matches alongside the England men's games against Pakistan, with the WODI matches being used as preparation for the 2022 Women's Cricket World Cup. The two teams last played each other in Malaysia in December 2019.

On 13 August 2021, the Pakistan Cricket Board (PCB) made a minor change to the tour itinerary, moving the matches from the National Stadium in Karachi to the Rawalpindi Cricket Stadium due to logistical reasons. On 24 August 2021, the PCB made another adjustment to the schedule, this time bringing the tour forward by three days.

On 17 September 2021, the England and Wales Cricket Board (ECB) said they would determine in the next 24 to 48 hours whether they will proceed with the tour or not, after New Zealand cancelled their tour of Pakistan due to a security threat. On 20 September, the ECB announced that the series had been cancelled, citing issues around wellbeing and concerns of travelling to the region. The Pakistan Cricket Board (PCB) Chairman Rameez Raja expressed his disappointment on Twitter and criticised England for "failing a member of their cricket fraternity".

== WT20I series ==
=== 1st WT20I ===
10 October 2021
Scorecard

Pakistan	v	England

Match cancelled
Rawalpindi Cricket Stadium, Rawalpindi

=== 2nd WT20I ===
October 2021
Scorecard

Pakistan	v	England

Match cancelled
Rawalpindi Cricket Stadium, Rawalpindi

== WODI series ==
=== 1st WODI ===
October 2021
Scorecard

Pakistan	v	England

Match cancelled
Rawalpindi Cricket Stadium, Rawalpindi

=== 2nd WODI ===
October 2021
Scorecard

Pakistan	v	England

Match cancelled
Rawalpindi Cricket Stadium, Rawalpindi

=== 3rd WODI ===
22 October 2021
Scorecard

Pakistan	v	England

Match cancelled
Rawalpindi Cricket Stadium, Rawalpindi
