= English cricket team in Pakistan in 2021–22 =

International cricket tour

	Pakistan	England
- Dates: 13 – 14 October 2021
Captains	Babar Azam	

Twenty20 International series

The England cricket team were scheduled to tour Pakistan in October 2021 to play two Twenty20 International (T20I) matches. The matches were planned to be played in Rawalpindi, with both teams using them as their preparations for the 2021 ICC Men's T20 World Cup. England last toured Pakistan in 2005. The T20I fixtures were scheduled to be played as double-header matches alongside the England women's games against Pakistan. In August 2021, the Pakistan Cricket Board (PCB) made a minor change to the tour itinerary, moving the matches from the National Stadium in Karachi to the Rawalpindi Cricket Stadium due to logistical reasons.

On 17 September 2021, the England and Wales Cricket Board (ECB) said they would determine in the next 24 to 48 hours whether they will proceed with the tour or not, after New Zealand cancelled their tour of Pakistan due to a security threat. On 20 September, the ECB announced that the series had been cancelled, citing issues around wellbeing and concerns of travelling to the region. The Pakistan Cricket Board (PCB) Chairman Ramiz Raja expressed his disappointment on Twitter and criticised England for "failing a member of their cricket fraternity".

== Squads ==
T20Is
Pakistan	England
Babar Azam (c); Shadab Khan (vc); Shaheen Afridi; Asif Ali; Hasan Ali; Mohammad Hafeez; Mohammad Hasnain; Azam Khan (wk); Sohaib Maqsood; Mohammad Nawaz; Haris Rauf; Mohammad Rizwan (wk); Khushdil Shah; Imad Wasim; Mohammad Wasim	

Usman Qadir, Shahnawaz Dahani and Fakhar Zaman were named as travelling reserves in Pakistan's squad.

== T20I series ==
=== 1st T20I ===
13 October 2021
Scorecard

Pakistan	v	England

Match cancelled
Rawalpindi Cricket Stadium, Rawalpindi

=== 2nd T20I ===
14 October 2021
Scorecard

Pakistan	v	England

Match cancelled
Rawalpindi Cricket Stadium, Rawalpindi
