= ICC Academy Ground =

Cricket ground

ICC Academy Ground 1
- ICCA 1
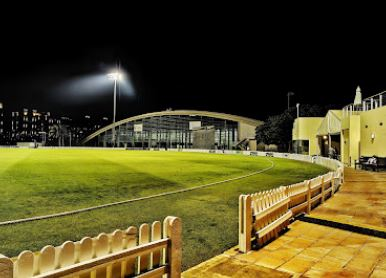
- ICC Academy Ground
- Interactive map of ICC Academy Ground 1

Ground information
- Location: Dubai, United Arab Emirates
- Country: United Arab Emirates
- Coordinates: 25°2′12″N 55°13′40″E
- Establishment: 2009; 17 years ago
- Capacity: 49,000

International information
- First ODI: 11 March 2013: Canada v Kenya
- Last ODI: 9 March 2022: United Arab Emirates v Oman
- First T20I: 13 March 2012: Kenya v Scotland
- Last T20I: 20 December 2024: Kuwait v Oman
- First WODI: 9 February 2019: Pakistan v West Indies
- Last WODI: 14 April 2024: Scotland v United States
- First WT20I: 22 November 2021: United Arab Emirates v Malaysia
- Last WT20I: 3 November 2023: United Arab Emirates v Namibia

Team information
United Arab Emirates national cricket team	(2009-present)
- As of 20 December 2024; Source: ICC Academy Ground 1

ICC Academy Ground 2
- ICCA 2
- Interactive map of ICC Academy Ground 2

Ground information

International information
- First T20I: 19 October 2019: Kenya v Scotland
- Last T20I: 23 October 2019: Kenya v Singapore
- First WT20I: 22 November 2021: Hong Kong v Nepal
- Last WT20I: 28 November 2021: United Arab Emirates v Nepal
- As of 28 November 2021; Source: ICC Academy Ground 2

The ICC Academy Ground is a cricket ground located in Dubai Sports City, Dubai. ICC Academy provides indoor and outdoor pitches. The ground was used for the 2014 ICC Under-19 Cricket World Cup. The two cricket grounds are installed with floodlights. The venue hosted warm-up matches ahead of the 2021 ICC Men's T20 World Cup.

== Trivia ==
In 2014, a match between Ireland and Scotland in Dubai Triangular Series 2014–15 was called off. This was the first time that an ODI in the UAE had been a no result. In September 2019, both grounds were named as two of the venues to host cricket matches for the 2019 ICC T20 World Cup Qualifier tournament.

== International record ==
=== ICC Academy Ground 1 ===
==== One Day International centuries ====
Following ODI centuries that have been scored at the venue.

No.	Score	Player	Team	Balls	Opposing team	Date	Result
1	112	Irfan Karim	Kenya	137	Canada	13 March 2013	Won
2	129	Nawroz Mangal	Afghanistan	123	United Arab Emirates	30 November 2014	Lost
3	132	Khurram Khan	United Arab Emirates	138	Afghanistan	30 November 2014	Won
4	124*	Mark Chapman	Hong Kong	116	United Arab Emirates	16 November 2015	Won
5	100	William Porterfield (1/2)	Ireland	116	United Arab Emirates	2 March 2017	Won
6	143*	Anshuman Rath	Hong Kong	137	Papua New Guinea	8 December 2017	Won
7	116*	Ed Joyce	Ireland	149	United Arab Emirates	11 January 2018	Won
8	139	William Porterfield (2/2)	Ireland	147	United Arab Emirates	13 January 2018	Won
9	102	Andrew Balbirnie	Ireland	109	United Arab Emirates	13 January 2018	Won
10	107*	Matthew Cross	Scotland	110	United Arab Emirates	21 January 2018	Won
11	121*	Rameez Shahzad	United Arab Emirates	115	Scotland	23 January 2018	Won
12	115	Paras Khadka	Nepal	109	United Arab Emirates	28 January 2019	Won
13	121*	Gerhard Erasmus	Namibia	120	Oman	6 March 2022	Won

==== One Day International five-wicket hauls ====
The following table summarizes the five-wicket hauls taken in ODIs at this venue.

#	Figures	Player	Country	Innings	Opponent	Date	Result
1	5/45	Hamid Hassan	Afghanistan	1	United Arab Emirates	4 December 2014	Lost
2	6/34	Zahoor Khan	United Arab Emirates	1	Ireland	2 March 2017	Lost
3	5/33	Sompal Kami	Nepal	2	United Arab Emirates	26 January 2019	Won
4	5/31	Bilal Khan	Oman	2	United Arab Emirates	5 March 2022	Won

==== Twenty20 International centuries ====
One T20I century has been scored at the venue.

No.	Score	Player	Team	Balls	Opposing team	Date	Result
1	107*	Muhammad Waseem	United Arab Emirates	62	Ireland	10 October 2021	Won

==== Twenty20 International five-wicket hauls ====
The following table summarizes the five-wicket hauls taken in T20Is at this venue.

#	Figures	Player	Country	Innings	Opponent	Date	Result
1	5/27	Mark Watt	Scotland	2	Netherlands	5 February 2016	Won
2	6/24	Jan Frylinck	Namibia	2	United Arab Emirates	5 October 2021	Won

=== ICC Academy Ground 2 ===
==== Women's Twenty20 International five-wicket hauls ====
The following table summarizes the five-wicket hauls taken in WT20Is at this venue.

#	Figures	Player	Country	Innings	Opponent	Date	Result
1	5/22	Khushi Sharma	United Arab Emirates	2	Bhutan	25 November 2021	Won

== See also ==
- International Cricket Council
- Dubai Sports City
- ICC Academy
