= Impact of the COVID-19 pandemic on cricket =

The COVID-19 pandemic has caused disruption to cricket around the world, mirroring its impact across all sports. Around the world and to varying degrees, leagues and competitions have been cancelled or postponed.

== International ==
=== Tournaments ===
In July 2020, the International Cricket Council (ICC) announced that both the 2020 and 2021 editions of the Men's T20 World Cup had each been postponed by one year due to the pandemic. Therefore, the 2020 tournament was moved to November 2021, and the 2021 tournament was moved to October 2022. Due to the disruption of qualification, the 2023 Cricket World Cup was also rescheduled from February–March 2023 to October–November 2023.

Australia and India retained the rights to host the Men's T20 World Cup, with the ICC announcing on 8 August that India will host the 2021 tournament, and Australia will host the 2022 tournament. The ICC also confirmed that the 2021 Women's Cricket World Cup and the tournament's qualifier had each been postponed by one year due to the pandemic. The qualifier itself would ultimately be cancelled midway through due to concerns about the rise of the Omicron variant in South Africa while the qualifier was being held in neighboring Zimbabwe, and instead of using the results from the games completed, Women's ODI rankings were used to qualify Bangladesh, Pakistan, and the West Indies for the finals, and Sri Lanka and Ireland for the next cycle of the ICC Women's Championship, a decision that controversially and detrimentally affected Thailand, an Associate team whose results in the qualifier had given them a fair chance of qualifying for the finals and/or the Women's Championship, but due to their lack of ranking, were instead left out of either.

Due to concerns over the COVID-19 situation in India, in June 2021 the ICC announced that the 2021 Men's T20 World Cup would be re-located to sites in the United Arab Emirates (UAE) and Oman. India remained the formal host nation of the tournament.

=== Rankings ===
In May 2021, five teams dropped off the ICC Men's T20I Team Rankings rankings due to failing to play enough fixtures to qualify in the relevant period.

== Africa ==
The 2020 ACA Africa T20 Cup was scheduled to take place in Kenya in March 2020, before it was postponed in line with the Kenyan government's 30-day ban on international gatherings. On 13 March 2020, the Netherlands tour to Namibia was cancelled due to the pandemic. Three days later, Ireland's tour to Zimbabwe also got cancelled. On 24 March, Namibia tri-series was postponed.

On 11 June 2020, the ICC confirmed that the Cricket World Cup Challenge League B has been postponed due to the COVID-19 pandemic. The following month, the ICC also confirmed that the Namibia Tri-Nation Series, scheduled to take place in September 2020, had also been postponed.

In August 2020, Afghanistan's tour to Zimbabwe was called off, following an increase of COVID-19 cases in Zimbabwe. Later the same month, the Netherlands' tour to Zimbabwe was also called off, along with Pakistan's planned tour to South Africa. In December 2020, England's ODI matches against South Africa were postponed following a COVID-19 outbreak.

In December 2020, the first match of South Africa vs England (under South Africa's ICC Men's Cricket World Cup Super League series) was initially postponed (later on cancelled) after two players of England Cricket Team tested positive for COVID-19 and also found breaching codes of bio-secure environment.

In early February 2021, Australian men announced that they would postpone their upcoming tour of South Africa because of the unacceptable risk of contracting COVID-19 whilst on Tour, along with difficulty in repatriating any Tour party members were some to contract the disease.

== Asia ==
The 2020 Everest Premier League in Nepal was also postponed on 12 March. On 13 March, the Board of Control for Cricket in India (BCCI) announced that the start of 2020 Indian Premier League will be postponed from 29 March to 15 April. On 16 April, BCCI suspended the tournament indefinitely due to the pandemic and on 4 June BCCI announced that IPL will staged outside India. On 13 March, BCCI cancelled the ODI matches between India and South Africa on 15 and 18 March, which were originally announced to be played without spectators. On the same day, the two-match Test series between Sri Lanka and England, scheduled to be played in March 2020, was also postponed. The remaining seven matches of the 2020 Road Safety World Series, a T20 tournament in India, were rescheduled to a later date. It was earlier decided that the remaining seven matches of the tournament would be played behind the closed doors in DY Patil Stadium.

A women's quadrangular series was scheduled to take place in Thailand in April 2020, but was cancelled a month before it was due to start. The 2020 Malaysia Cricket World Cup Challenge League A, scheduled to take place in March 2020, was postponed, along with two T20I matches between a World XI and Asia XI side.

On 12 March, the Pakistan Cricket Board announced that all remaining matches of the Pakistan Super League's ongoing fifth season being played in Karachi (where the majority of cases in Pakistan had been concentrated) would be closed to spectators. On 16 March 2020, the remaining play-offs in the 2020 Pakistan Super League were postponed due to a huge spike in the number of coronavirus cases around the country. The Bangladesh tour of Pakistan for a single ODI and a Test match was also postponed. On 24 March 2020, the International Cricket Council (ICC) confirmed that all ICC qualifying events scheduled to take place before 30 June 2020 had been postponed due to the COVID-19 pandemic. This included 2020–21 ICC Men's T20 World Cup Asia Qualifier for Western and Eastern sub-regions.

On 9 April 2020, there was an announcement of postponement of Australia-Bangladesh Test series. On 20 April 2020, Sri Lanka and South Africa cricket boards confirmed that SA tour to the island nation has been postponed.

On 23 June 2020, New Zealand cricket team's tour to Bangladesh, which was scheduled to take place in August, was postponed. A day later, on 24 June 2020, the Bangladesh's tour to Sri Lanka was postponed due to the pandemic.

On 9 July 2020, the 2020 Asia Cup was postponed until the following July, with the 2020 Asia Cup Qualifier tournament cancelled. On 25 August 2020, the ICC confirmed that the 2020 Malaysia Cricket World Cup Challenge League A tournament had been postponed again due to the pandemic. The following month, it was confirmed that the 2020 edition of the Women's Asia Cup, scheduled to take place in September in Bangladesh, had also been cancelled due to the pandemic. On 28 September 2020, Bangladesh's planned tour to Sri Lanka was postponed for a second time, after both cricket boards could not agree on the quarantine requirements.

In October 2020, the Bangladesh Cricket Board (BCB) confirmed that there would be no edition of the Bangladesh Premier League in 2020, due to the pandemic. In January 2021, the Ireland cricket team were scheduled to play four ODIs against the UAE. However, a COVID-19 outbreak in the UAE team meant that the tour schedule was changed multiple times, resulting in only two of the four matches being played.

In India, the 2020–21 Ranji Trophy tournament was cancelled due to the pandemic, the first time since the tournament's inception in the 1934–35 season that the Ranji Trophy was not held. On 5 May 2021, the 2021 Indian Premier League was suspended indefinitely, after a rise in COVID-19 cases within teams. The remainder of the season was played in the UAE.

In Pakistan, the 2021 Pakistan Super League was postponed from March–April to 1 June. They were hosted in United Arab Emirates due to growing cases of the COVID-19 pandemic. The winner surprisingly became Multan Sultans (They were below the table for the entire time. Until the tournament postponed and hosted again on 1 June.)

== Europe ==
On 11 March 2020, English teams Worcestershire and Surrey both cancelled their pre-season warm-up tours to the United Arab Emirates. The following day, Australia Women's tour to South Africa in March 2020 became the first major international series to be curtailed due to the pandemic. On 21 March 2020, announcement was made for postponement of Bangladesh's summer tour to Ireland. Teams from Austria, Luxembourg and Romania were to tour Belgium for their T20 international series in April and May. All the three series got cancelled.

On 21 April 2020, the Dutch government banned all public events in the country through August, requiring the postponement of tours of the Netherlands by New Zealand, Pakistan and the West Indies. A quadrangular series to by played in Netherlands in June was also postponed.

On 5 May 2020, Tom Harrison, chief of the England and Wales Cricket Board (ECB), told the Digital, Culture, Media and Sport Committee that the ECB could lose as much as £380 million if the entirety of the season were to be cancelled, and hoped that investments in the upcoming limited overs competition The Hundred could be a "profit centre" for the ECB.

Australia were originally scheduled to tour England in July 2020 to play three One Day International (ODI) and three Twenty20 International (T20I) matches. Due to pandemic, in May 2020, it was suggested that the dates for the series were moved back to September. The New Zealand tour of Ireland was postponed on 15 May 2020 due to the pandemic. At the same time Pakistan's tour was also called-off.

On 1 June 2020, the Professional Cricketers' Association confirmed that county cricketers will continue to take pay cuts of up to 20 per cent for the months of June and July. On 10 June 2020, the International Cricket Council (ICC) confirmed that the Scotland tri-series, also involving Nepal and Namibia has been postponed due to the pandemic. Australia were supposed to tour Scotland for a solitary T20I. However, on 17 June 2020, Cricket Scotland confirmed that the match had been cancelled.

In August 2020, South Africa women's planned tour to England was cancelled. In November 2020, Ireland and Scotland women's planned tour to Spain was postponed, after Scotland withdrew. In September 2020, the seventh edition of the Central Europe Cup in Prague was one of several annual associate member tournaments to be cancelled.

In November 2020, the planned Cricket World Cup Super League fixtures between the Netherlands and England was postponed. The series was originally scheduled to be played in May 2021, but it was moved to May 2022 due to the pandemic.

== North America ==
On 13 March 2020, the 2020 United States Tri-Nation Series was postponed due to the pandemic and travel restrictions to the United States. The tri-series also involved Scotland and the UAE. The 2019–20 West Indies Championship was suspended due to the pandemic and Barbados was declared the champion on 24 March.

The men's and women's Central American Cricket Championship were scheduled for April and May 2020 respectively. On 1 April, both tournaments were cancelled as a result of the pandemic. The pandemic delayed the launch timelines for USA Cricket's planned domestic T20 leagues, with Minor League Cricket delayed to 2021, and Major League Cricket delayed to 2023 due to both the pandemic and the need to construct cricket-specific facilities.

New Zealand's tour of the West Indies and South Africa's tour of the West Indies were both postponed, after the West Indies tour to England was rescheduled.

The ODI portion of an Ireland series in December 2021 against the United States was cancelled due to COVID-19 issues.

== South America ==
On 23 March, the T20I series between Brazil women's team and Argentina women's team was postponed. The 2020 South American Cricket Championship were also cancelled after being postponed from October 2020.

== Oceania ==
On 14 March 2020, the remaining two One Day International (ODI) matches of the Chappell–Hadlee Trophy along with the three-match Twenty20 International (T20I) series between Australia and New Zealand were cancelled due to new border restrictions imposed by the New Zealand government. The first ODI match of the series had been played on 13 March behind closed doors in Sydney. The following day, Cricket Australia confirmed that the final round of matches in the 2019–20 Sheffield Shield season had been cancelled, with New South Wales being named as the winners of the tournament. New Zealand Cricket cancelled the final two rounds of matches in the 2019–20 Plunket Shield season, with Wellington being named the winners of the tournament. On 24 March 2020, the ICC confirmed that all ICC qualifying events, across all regions, scheduled to take place before 30 June 2020 had been postponed due to the pandemic. This included tri-series between PNG, Nepal and UAE.

On 30 June 2020, Zimbabwe's ODI tour to Australia was postponed. On 4 August 2020, the West Indies T20I tour to Australia was also postponed. On 25 September 2020, Cricket Australia confirmed that the one-off Test match against Afghanistan, and the limited-overs series against New Zealand had both been postponed due to the pandemic.
