= International cricket in 2020–21 =

International cricket season

The 2020–21 international cricket season took place from September 2020 to April 2021. 29 Tests, 49 One Day Internationals (ODIs), 50 Twenty20 Internationals (T20Is), 17 Women's One Day Internationals (WODIs) and 21 Women's Twenty20 Internationals (WT20Is) were scheduled to be played during this period. Additionally, a number of other T20I/WT20I matches were also scheduled to be played in minor series involving associate nations.

The impact of the COVID-19 pandemic continued into the 2020–21 international calendar. The 2021 Women's Cricket World Cup in New Zealand was scheduled to take place during this time, starting on 6 February 2021. However, in August 2020, this was postponed by one year because of the COVID-19 pandemic. The 2020 ICC Men's T20 World Cup was also scheduled to be played in October and November in Australia, but this was also postponed by one year due to the pandemic.

In July 2020, the men's 2020 Asia Cup, scheduled to be held in September 2020, was postponed until June 2021. In August 2020, the West Indies tour of Australia was postponed, along with India's T20I fixtures against Australia. Also in August 2020, England's ODI and T20I matches against India was rescheduled to take place in early 2021. Bangladesh's tour to Sri Lanka, originally scheduled to be played in July 2020, was moved to October 2020. On 28 August 2020, Pakistan's planned tour to South Africa was also postponed. However, in October 2020, the tour was rescheduled to take place in April 2021.

In September 2020, it was confirmed that the 2020 edition of the Women's Asia Cup, scheduled to be played in Bangladesh, had been cancelled as well. Also in September, Cricket Australia confirmed that the one-off Test match against Afghanistan, and the limited-overs series against New Zealand had both been postponed due to the pandemic. On 28 September 2020, Bangladesh's planned tour to Sri Lanka was postponed for a second time, after both cricket boards could not agree on the quarantine requirements.

International women's cricket started with the first WT20I between Australia and New Zealand, with Australia winning by 17 runs. Australia won the WT20I series 2–1, and then went on to win the WODI series between the two teams 3–0. With their 3–0, the team recorded 21 consecutive wins in the format, equalling the men's record set by Ricky Ponting's team in the 2002–03 season. International men's cricket started with Zimbabwe's tour of Pakistan, with Pakistan winning the first ODI match by 26 runs. In November 2020, Ireland and Scotland women's planned tour to Spain was the next series to be cancelled due to the COVID-19 pandemic, after Scotland withdrew from the series. In December 2020, England's ODI matches against South Africa were postponed following a COVID-19 outbreak. On 31 December 2020, Cricket Australia confirmed that the India women's tour of Australia, scheduled to take place in January 2021, had been postponed by one year.

In December 2020, the International Cricket Council (ICC) announced a revised schedule for fixtures that had been postponed due to the pandemic that formed part of the qualification pathway for the 2023 Cricket World Cup. These included the Cricket World Cup League 2 matches scheduled to be played in Namibia and Nepal, and the Cricket World Cup Challenge League series originally planned to be played in Malaysia. In January 2021, Ireland were scheduled to play four ODIs in the UAE against the hosts. However, two matches were cancelled following a COVID-19 scare within the UAE's team, resulting in the tour schedule being changed on multiple occasions. Disruption continued into February 2021, with Australia's planned tour of South Africa being postponed, and Pakistan women's tour of Zimbabwe being cut short after one match, following flight restrictions from Harare to Pakistan. Rounds six and seven of the ICC Cricket World Cup League 2 tournament, scheduled to take place in Oman and Papua New Guinea respectively, were also postponed.

In January and February 2021, South Africa toured Pakistan for the first time in fourteen years, playing two Tests and three T20I matches. During the tour, Pakistan became the first men's team to win 100 T20I matches. In April 2021, the Australia women's cricket team set a new record of twenty-two consecutive wins in ODI cricket, breaking Ricky Ponting's team record from 2002 to 2003, when they beat New Zealand by six wickets.

== Season overview ==
Men's international tours
Start date	Home team	Away team	Results [Matches]		
Start date	Home team	Away team	Test	ODI	T20I
4 October 2020 (Note: The tour was cancelled due to the COVID-19 pandemic.)	Australia	West Indies	—	—	[3]
October 2020 (Note: The tour was originally scheduled to take place in October 2020, but did not take place.)	Sri Lanka	Zimbabwe	—	[3]	[2]
30 October 2020	Pakistan	Zimbabwe	—	2–1 [3]	3–0 [3]
27 November 2020 (Note: The T20I fixtures were originally scheduled to take place in October 2020, but were rescheduled for December 2020 after the T20 World Cup was moved back a year due to the COVID-19 pandemic.)	Australia	India	1–2 [4]	2–1 [3]	1–2 [3]
27 November 2020	New Zealand	West Indies	2–0 [2]	—	2–0 [3]
27 November 2020 (Note: The ODI matches were postponed due to the COVID-19 pandemic.)	South Africa	England	—	[3]	0–3 [3]
7 December 2020	Australia	Afghanistan	[1]	—	—
18 December 2020	New Zealand	Pakistan	2–0 [2]	—	2–1 [3]
26 December 2020	South Africa	Sri Lanka	2–0 [2]	—	—
8 January 2021 (Note: Two of the four matches were cancelled due to COVID-19.)	United Arab Emirates	Ireland	—	1–1 [4]	—
14 January 2021	Sri Lanka	England	0–2 [2]	—	—
20 January 2021	Bangladesh	West Indies	0–2 [2]	3–0 [3]	—
21 January 2021	(United Arab Emirates) Afghanistan	Ireland	—	3–0 [3]	—
26 January 2021	Australia	New Zealand	—	[3]	[1]
26 January 2021	Pakistan	South Africa	2–0 [2]	—	2–1 [3]
5 February 2021	India	England	3–1 [4]	2–1 [3]	3–2 [5]
22 February 2021	New Zealand	Australia	—	—	3–2 [5]
2 March 2021	(United Arab Emirates) Afghanistan	Zimbabwe	1–1 [2]	—	3–0 [3]
3 March 2021	West Indies	Sri Lanka	0–0 [2]	3–0 [3]	2–1 [3]
20 March 2021	New Zealand	Bangladesh	—	3–0 [3]	3–0 [3]
March 2021	South Africa	Australia	[3]	—	—
2 April 2021 (Note: The tour was originally scheduled to take place in October 2020, but was moved to April 2021 due to the COVID-19 pandemic.)	South Africa	Pakistan	—	1–2 [3]	1–3 [4]
21 April 2021 (Note: The tour was originally scheduled to take place in July and August 2020, but was moved to April and May 2021 due to the COVID-19 pandemic.)	Sri Lanka	Bangladesh	1–0 [2]	—	—
21 April 2021	Zimbabwe	Pakistan	0–2 [2]	—	1–2 [3]
Men's international tournaments
Start date	Tournament				Winners
September 2020 (Note: The tournament was scheduled to take place, but was cancelled due to the COVID-19 pandemic.)	2020 Asia Cup				—N/a
19 March 2021	2021 Oman Tri-Nation Series				—N/a
14 April 2021	2021 Papua New Guinea Tri-Nation Series				—N/a

Women's international tours
Start date	Home team	Away team	Results [Matches]		
Start date	Home team	Away team	WTest	WODI	WT20I
26 September 2020	Australia	New Zealand	—	3–0 [3]	2–1 [3]
23 November 2020	(Spain) Ireland	Scotland	—	—	[3]
20 January 2021	South Africa	Pakistan	—	3–0 [3]	2–1 [3]
17 February 2021 (Note: The tour was cancelled due to flight restrictions.)	Zimbabwe	Pakistan	—	—	[3]
23 February 2021	New Zealand	England	—	1–2 [3]	0–3 [3]
7 March 2021	India	South Africa	—	1–4 [5]	1–2 [3]
28 March 2021	New Zealand	Australia	—	0–3 [3]	1–1 [3]
Women's international tournaments
Start date	Tournament			Winners	
September 2020	(Bangladesh) 2020 Women's Twenty20 Asia Cup			—N/a	

== Rankings ==
The following were the rankings at the beginning of the season.

ICC Men's Test Team Rankings 3 September 2020
Rank	Team	Matches	Points	Rating
1	Australia	26	3,028	116
2	New Zealand	21	2,406	115
3	India	27	3,085	114
4	England	41	4,326	106
5	Sri Lanka	27	2,454	91
6	South Africa	23	2,076	90
7	Pakistan	20	1,692	85
8	West Indies	22	1,742	79
9	Bangladesh	17	939	55
10	Zimbabwe	8	144	18

ICC Men's ODI Team Rankings 16 September 2020
Rank	Team	Matches	Points	Rating
1	England	44	5,405	123
2	India	49	5,819	119
3	New Zealand	32	3,716	116
4	Australia	36	3,941	109
5	South Africa	31	3,345	108
6	Pakistan	32	3,254	102
7	Bangladesh	34	2,989	88
8	Sri Lanka	39	3,297	85
9	West Indies	43	3,285	76
10	Afghanistan	28	1,549	55
11	Ireland	24	1,256	52
12	Netherlands	5	222	44
13	Oman	12	479	40
14	Zimbabwe	24	935	39
15	Scotland	16	419	26
16	Nepal	9	161	18
Only the top 16 teams are shown

ICC Men's T20I Team Rankings 8 September 2020
Rank	Team	Matches	Points	Rating
1	Australia	22	6,047	275
2	England	22	5,959	271
3	India	35	9,319	266
4	Pakistan	23	6,009	261
5	South Africa	17	4,380	258
6	New Zealand	23	5,565	242
7	Sri Lanka	23	5,293	230
8	Bangladesh	20	4,583	229
9	West Indies	24	5,499	229
10	Afghanistan	17	3,882	228
11	Zimbabwe	18	3,442	191
12	Ireland	29	5,513	190
13	United Arab Emirates	23	4,288	186
14	Scotland	17	3,096	182
15	Nepal	23	4,148	180
16	Papua New Guinea	21	3,769	179
Only the top 16 teams are shown

ICC Women's ODI Rankings 2 October 2020
Rank	Team	Matches	Points	Rating
1	Australia	12	1,923	160
2	India	15	1,812	121
3	England	14	1,670	119
4	South Africa	16	1,713	107
5	New Zealand	12	1,133	94
6	West Indies	12	1,025	85
7	Pakistan	12	927	77
8	Bangladesh	5	306	61
9	Sri Lanka	11	519	47
10	Ireland	2	25	13

ICC Women's T20I Rankings 2 October 2020
Rank	Team	Matches	Points	Rating
1	Australia	29	8,438	291
2	England	30	8,405	280
3	India	32	8,640	270
4	New Zealand	23	6,197	269
5	South Africa	24	5,978	249
6	West Indies	26	6,126	236
7	Pakistan	24	5,516	230
8	Sri Lanka	18	3,631	202
9	Bangladesh	26	5,001	192
10	Ireland	13	2,180	168
11	Thailand	26	4,145	159
12	Zimbabwe	11	1,711	156
13	Scotland	10	1,491	149
14	Nepal	11	1,457	132
15	Papua New Guinea	11	1,423	129
16	Samoa	6	749	125
Only the top 16 teams are shown

=== On-going tournaments ===
The following were the rankings at the beginning of the season.

2019–2021 ICC World Test Championship
Rank	Team	Series	Points
1	India	4	360
2	Australia	3	296
3	England	4	292
4	New Zealand	3	180
5	Pakistan	4	166
6	Sri Lanka	2	80
7	West Indies	2	40
8	South Africa	2	24
9	Bangladesh	2	0
Full Table

2020–2023 ICC Cricket World Cup Super League
Rank	Team	Matches	Points
1	England	6	30
2	Australia	3	20
3	Ireland	3	10
Full Table

2019–2023 ICC Cricket World Cup League 2
Rank	Team	Matches	Points
1	Oman	10	16
2	United States	12	12
3	Scotland	8	9
4	Namibia	7	8
5	United Arab Emirates	7	7
6	Nepal	4	4
7	Papua New Guinea	8	0
Full Table

2019–22 ICC Cricket World Cup Challenge League
League A
Rank	Team	Matches	Points
1	Canada	5	8
2	Singapore	5	8
3	Qatar	5	6
4	Denmark	5	4
5	Malaysia	5	2
6	Vanuatu	5	2
Full Table

2019–22 ICC Cricket World Cup Challenge League
League B
Rank	Team	Matches	Points
1	Uganda	5	10
2	Hong Kong	5	7
3	Italy	5	5
4	Jersey	5	4
5	Kenya	5	3
6	Bermuda	5	1
Full Table

== September ==
=== 2020 Asia Cup ===
The T20I tournament was postponed in July 2020 due to the COVID-19 pandemic.

=== 2020 Women's Twenty20 Asia Cup ===
The WT20I tournament was postponed in September 2020 due to the COVID-19 pandemic.

=== New Zealand women in Australia ===
WT20I series
No.	Date	Home captain	Away captain	Venue	Result
WT20I 874	26 September	Meg Lanning	Sophie Devine	Allan Border Field, Brisbane	Australia by 17 runs
WT20I 876	27 September	Meg Lanning	Sophie Devine	Allan Border Field, Brisbane	Australia by 8 wickets
WT20I 878	30 September	Meg Lanning	Sophie Devine	Allan Border Field, Brisbane	New Zealand by 5 wickets
WODI series
No.	Date	Home captain	Away captain	Venue	Result
WODI 1181	3 October	Meg Lanning	Sophie Devine	Allan Border Field, Brisbane	Australia by 7 wickets
WODI 1182	5 October	Meg Lanning	Sophie Devine	Allan Border Field, Brisbane	Australia by 4 wickets
WODI 1183	7 October	Rachael Haynes	Sophie Devine	Allan Border Field, Brisbane	Australia by 232 runs

== October ==
=== West Indies in Australia ===
The tour was postponed in August 2020 due to the COVID-19 pandemic.

T20I series
No.	Date	Home captain	Away captain	Venue	Result
1st T20I	4 October			Riverway Stadium, Townsville	
2nd T20I	6 October			Cazaly's Stadium, Cairns	
3rd T20I	9 October			Carrara Stadium, Gold Coast	

=== Zimbabwe in Sri Lanka ===
The tour was scheduled to take place in October 2020, but did not take place, before being rescheduled for January 2022.

T20I series
No.	Date	Home captain	Away captain	Venue	Result
[1st T20I]					
[2nd T20I]					
2020–2023 ICC Cricket World Cup Super League – ODI series
No.	Date	Home captain	Away captain	Venue	Result
[1st ODI]					
[2nd ODI]					
[3rd ODI]					

=== Zimbabwe in Pakistan ===
2020–2023 ICC Cricket World Cup Super League – ODI series
No.	Date	Home captain	Away captain	Venue	Result
ODI 4262	30 October	Babar Azam	Chamu Chibhabha	Rawalpindi Cricket Stadium, Rawalpindi	Pakistan by 26 runs
ODI 4263	1 November	Babar Azam	Chamu Chibhabha	Rawalpindi Cricket Stadium, Rawalpindi	Pakistan by 6 wickets
ODI 4264	3 November	Babar Azam	Chamu Chibhabha	Rawalpindi Cricket Stadium, Rawalpindi	Match tied (Zimbabwe won S/O)
T20I series
No.	Date	Home captain	Away captain	Venue	Result
T20I 1105	7 November	Babar Azam	Chamu Chibhabha	Rawalpindi Cricket Stadium, Rawalpindi	Pakistan by 6 wickets
T20I 1106	8 November	Babar Azam	Chamu Chibhabha	Rawalpindi Cricket Stadium, Rawalpindi	Pakistan by 8 wickets
T20I 1107	10 November	Babar Azam	Chamu Chibhabha	Rawalpindi Cricket Stadium, Rawalpindi	Pakistan by 8 wickets

== November ==
=== India in Australia ===
The T20I fixtures were originally scheduled to take place in October 2020, but were rescheduled for December 2020 after the T20 World Cup was moved back a year due to the COVID-19 pandemic.

2020–2023 ICC Cricket World Cup Super League – ODI series
No.	Date	Home captain	Away captain	Venue	Result
ODI 4265	27 November	Aaron Finch	Virat Kohli	Sydney Cricket Ground, Sydney	Australia by 66 runs
ODI 4266	29 November	Aaron Finch	Virat Kohli	Sydney Cricket Ground, Sydney	Australia by 51 runs
ODI 4267	2 December	Aaron Finch	Virat Kohli	Manuka Oval, Canberra	India by 13 runs
T20I series
No.	Date	Home captain	Away captain	Venue	Result
T20I 1114	4 December	Aaron Finch	Virat Kohli	Manuka Oval, Canberra	India by 11 runs
T20I 1115	6 December	Matthew Wade	Virat Kohli	Sydney Cricket Ground, Sydney	India by 6 wickets
T20I 1116	8 December	Aaron Finch	Virat Kohli	Sydney Cricket Ground, Sydney	Australia by 12 runs
Border–Gavaskar Trophy, 2019–2021 ICC World Test Championship – Test series
No.	Date	Home captain	Away captain	Venue	Result
Test 2396	17–21 December	Tim Paine	Virat Kohli	Adelaide Oval, Adelaide	Australia by 8 wickets
Test 2398	26–30 December	Tim Paine	Ajinkya Rahane	Melbourne Cricket Ground, Melbourne	India by 8 wickets
Test 2402	7–11 January	Tim Paine	Ajinkya Rahane	Sydney Cricket Ground, Sydney	Match drawn
Test 2404	15–19 January	Tim Paine	Ajinkya Rahane	The Gabba, Brisbane	India by 3 wickets

=== West Indies in New Zealand ===
T20I series
No.	Date	Home captain	Away captain	Venue	Result
T20I 1108	27 November	Tim Southee	Kieron Pollard	Eden Park, Auckland	New Zealand by 5 wickets (DLS)
T20I 1110	29 November	Tim Southee	Kieron Pollard	Bay Oval, Mount Maunganui	New Zealand by 72 runs
T20I 1112	30 November	Mitchell Santner	Kieron Pollard	Bay Oval, Mount Maunganui	No result
2019–2021 ICC World Test Championship – Test series
No.	Date	Home captain	Away captain	Venue	Result
Test 2394	3–7 December	Kane Williamson	Jason Holder	Seddon Park, Hamilton	New Zealand by an innings and 134 runs
Test 2395	11–15 December	Tom Latham	Jason Holder	Basin Reserve, Wellington	New Zealand by an innings and 12 runs

=== Ireland women against Scotland women in Spain ===
The tour was cancelled in November 2020 due to the COVID-19 pandemic.

WT20I series
No.	Date	Ireland captain	Scotland captain	Venue	Result
[1st WT20I]	27 November	Laura Delany	Kathryn Bryce	La Manga Club, Cartagena	
[2nd WT20I]	27 November	Laura Delany	Kathryn Bryce	La Manga Club, Cartagena	
[3rd WT20I]	28 November	Laura Delany	Kathryn Bryce	La Manga Club, Cartagena	

=== England in South Africa ===
The ODI matches were postponed in December 2020 due to the COVID-19 pandemic.

T20I series
No.	Date	Home captain	Away captain	Venue	Result
T20I 1109	27 November	Quinton de Kock	Eoin Morgan	Newlands Cricket Ground, Cape Town	England by 5 wickets
T20I 1111	29 November	Quinton de Kock	Eoin Morgan	Boland Park, Paarl	England by 4 wickets
T20I 1113	1 December	Quinton de Kock	Eoin Morgan	Newlands Cricket Ground, Cape Town	England by 9 wickets
2020–2023 ICC Cricket World Cup Super League – ODI series
No.	Date	Home captain	Away captain	Venue	Result
ODI 4267a	6 December	Quinton de Kock	Eoin Morgan	Boland Park, Paarl	
ODI 4267b	7 December	Quinton de Kock	Eoin Morgan	Newlands Cricket Ground, Cape Town	
ODI 4267c	9 December	Quinton de Kock	Eoin Morgan	Newlands Cricket Ground, Cape Town	

== December ==
=== Afghanistan in Australia ===
The tour was postponed in September 2020 due to the COVID-19 pandemic. In December 2020, the Afghanistan Cricket Board rescheduled the match for November 2021.

Only Test
No.	Date	Home captain	Away captain	Venue	Result
Only Test	7–11 December			Perth Stadium, Perth	

=== Pakistan in New Zealand ===
T20I series
No.	Date	Home captain	Away captain	Venue	Result
T20I 1117	18 December	Mitchell Santner	Shadab Khan	Eden Park, Auckland	New Zealand by 5 wickets
T20I 1118	20 December	Kane Williamson	Shadab Khan	Seddon Park, Hamilton	New Zealand by 9 wickets
T20I 1119	22 December	Kane Williamson	Shadab Khan	McLean Park, Napier	Pakistan by 4 wickets
2019–2021 ICC World Test Championship – Test series
No.	Date	Home captain	Away captain	Venue	Result
Test 2397	26–30 December	Kane Williamson	Mohammad Rizwan	Bay Oval, Mount Maunganui	New Zealand by 101 runs
Test 2400	3–7 January	Kane Williamson	Mohammad Rizwan	Hagley Oval, Christchurch	New Zealand by an innings and 176 runs

=== Sri Lanka in South Africa ===
2019–2021 ICC World Test Championship – Test series
No.	Date	Home captain	Away captain	Venue	Result
Test 2399	26–30 December	Quinton de Kock	Dimuth Karunaratne	Centurion Park, Centurion	South Africa by an innings and 45 runs
Test 2401	3–7 January	Quinton de Kock	Dimuth Karunaratne	Wanderers Stadium, Johannesburg	South Africa by 10 wickets

== January ==
=== Ireland in United Arab Emirates ===
Two of the four matches were cancelled due to COVID-19.

ODI series
No.	Date	Home captain	Away captain	Venue	Result
ODI 4268	8 January	Ahmed Raza	Andrew Balbirnie	Sheikh Zayed Cricket Stadium, Abu Dhabi	United Arab Emirates by 6 wickets
ODI 4268a	12 January	Ahmed Raza	Andrew Balbirnie	Sheikh Zayed Cricket Stadium, Abu Dhabi	Match cancelled
ODI 4268b	14 January	Ahmed Raza	Andrew Balbirnie	Sheikh Zayed Cricket Stadium, Abu Dhabi	Match cancelled
ODI 4269	18 January	Ahmed Raza	Andrew Balbirnie	Sheikh Zayed Cricket Stadium, Abu Dhabi	Ireland by 112 runs

=== England in Sri Lanka ===
2019–2021 ICC World Test Championship – Test series
No.	Date	Home captain	Away captain	Venue	Result
Test 2403	14–18 January	Dinesh Chandimal	Joe Root	Galle International Stadium, Galle	England by 7 wickets
Test 2405	22–26 January	Dinesh Chandimal	Joe Root	Galle International Stadium, Galle	England by 6 wickets

=== West Indies in Bangladesh ===
2020–2023 ICC Cricket World Cup Super League – ODI series
No.	Date	Home captain	Away captain	Venue	Result
ODI 4270	20 January	Tamim Iqbal	Jason Mohammed	Sher-e-Bangla National Cricket Stadium, Dhaka	Bangladesh by 6 wickets
ODI 4272	22 January	Tamim Iqbal	Jason Mohammed	Sher-e-Bangla National Cricket Stadium, Dhaka	Bangladesh by 7 wickets
ODI 4274	25 January	Tamim Iqbal	Jason Mohammed	Zohur Ahmed Chowdhury Stadium, Chittagong	Bangladesh by 120 runs
2019–2021 ICC World Test Championship – Test series
No.	Date	Home captain	Away captain	Venue	Result
Test 2407	3–7 February	Mominul Haque	Kraigg Brathwaite	Zohur Ahmed Chowdhury Stadium, Chittagong	West Indies by 3 wickets
Test 2410	11–15 February	Mominul Haque	Kraigg Brathwaite	Sher-e-Bangla National Cricket Stadium, Dhaka	West Indies by 17 runs

=== Pakistan women in South Africa ===
WODI series
No.	Date	Home captain	Away captain	Venue	Result
WODI 1184	20 January	Suné Luus	Javeria Khan	Kingsmead, Durban	South Africa by 3 runs
WODI 1185	23 January	Suné Luus	Javeria Khan	Kingsmead, Durban	South Africa by 13 runs
WODI 1186	26 January	Suné Luus	Javeria Khan	Kingsmead, Durban	South Africa by 32 runs
WT20I series
No.	Date	Home captain	Away captain	Venue	Result
WT20I 880	29 January	Suné Luus	Aliya Riaz	Kingsmead, Durban	South Africa by 8 wickets
WT20I 881	31 January	Suné Luus	Aliya Riaz	Kingsmead, Durban	South Africa by 18 runs
WT20I 882	3 February	Suné Luus	Javeria Khan	Kingsmead, Durban	Pakistan by 8 runs (DLS)

=== Ireland vs Afghanistan in the UAE ===
2020–2023 ICC Cricket World Cup Super League – ODI series
No.	Date	Home captain	Away captain	Venue	Result
ODI 4271	21 January	Asghar Afghan	Andrew Balbirnie	Sheikh Zayed Cricket Stadium, Abu Dhabi	Afghanistan by 16 runs
ODI 4273	24 January	Asghar Afghan	Andrew Balbirnie	Sheikh Zayed Cricket Stadium, Abu Dhabi	Afghanistan by 7 wickets
ODI 4275	26 January	Asghar Afghan	Andrew Balbirnie	Sheikh Zayed Cricket Stadium, Abu Dhabi	Afghanistan by 36 runs

=== New Zealand in Australia ===
The tour was postponed in September 2020 due to the COVID-19 pandemic. In May 2021, Cricket Australia rescheduled the tour to take place in January and February 2022.

2020–2023 ICC Cricket World Cup Super League, Chappell–Hadlee Trophy – ODI series
No.	Date	Home captain	Away captain	Venue	Result
1st ODI	26 January			Adelaide Oval, Adelaide	
2nd ODI	29 January			Manuka Oval, Canberra	
3rd ODI	31 January			Bellerive Oval, Hobart	
Only T20I
No.	Date	Home captain	Away captain	Venue	Result
Only T20I	2 February			Sydney Cricket Ground, Sydney	

=== South Africa in Pakistan ===
2019–2021 ICC World Test Championship – Test series
No.	Date	Home captain	Away captain	Venue	Result
Test 2406	26–30 January	Babar Azam	Quinton de Kock	National Stadium, Karachi	Pakistan by 7 wickets
Test 2408	4–8 February	Babar Azam	Quinton de Kock	Rawalpindi Cricket Stadium, Rawalpindi	Pakistan by 95 runs
T20I series
No.	Date	Home captain	Away captain	Venue	Result
T20I 1120	11 February	Babar Azam	Heinrich Klaasen	Gaddafi Stadium, Lahore	Pakistan by 3 runs
T20I 1121	13 February	Babar Azam	Heinrich Klaasen	Gaddafi Stadium, Lahore	South Africa by 6 wickets
T20I 1122	14 February	Babar Azam	Heinrich Klaasen	Gaddafi Stadium, Lahore	Pakistan by 4 wickets

== February ==
=== England in India ===
The ODI and T20I matches were originally scheduled to be played in September to October 2020, but they were rescheduled due to the COVID-19 pandemic.

Anthony de Mello Trophy, 2019–2021 ICC World Test Championship – Test series
No.	Date	Home captain	Away captain	Venue	Result
Test 2409	5–9 February	Virat Kohli	Joe Root	M. A. Chidambaram Stadium, Chennai	England by 227 runs
Test 2411	13–17 February	Virat Kohli	Joe Root	M. A. Chidambaram Stadium, Chennai	India by 317 runs
Test 2412	24–28 February	Virat Kohli	Joe Root	Narendra Modi Stadium, Ahmedabad	India by 10 wickets
Test 2414	4–8 March	Virat Kohli	Joe Root	Narendra Modi Stadium, Ahmedabad	India by an innings and 25 runs
T20I series
No.	Date	Home captain	Away captain	Venue	Result
T20I 1131	12 March	Virat Kohli	Eoin Morgan	Narendra Modi Stadium, Ahmedabad	England by 8 wickets
T20I 1132	14 March	Virat Kohli	Eoin Morgan	Narendra Modi Stadium, Ahmedabad	India by 7 wickets
T20I 1133	16 March	Virat Kohli	Eoin Morgan	Narendra Modi Stadium, Ahmedabad	England by 8 wickets
T20I 1135	18 March	Virat Kohli	Eoin Morgan	Narendra Modi Stadium, Ahmedabad	India by 8 runs
T20I 1138	20 March	Virat Kohli	Eoin Morgan	Narendra Modi Stadium, Ahmedabad	India by 36 runs
2020–2023 ICC Cricket World Cup Super League – ODI series
No.	Date	Home captain	Away captain	Venue	Result
ODI 4281	23 March	Virat Kohli	Eoin Morgan	Maharashtra Cricket Association Stadium, Pune	India by 66 runs
ODI 4283	26 March	Virat Kohli	Jos Buttler	Maharashtra Cricket Association Stadium, Pune	England by 6 wickets
ODI 4284	28 March	Virat Kohli	Jos Buttler	Maharashtra Cricket Association Stadium, Pune	India by 7 runs

=== Pakistan women in Zimbabwe ===
The tour was cancelled in February 2021 due to flight restrictions.

WT20I series
No.	Date	Home captain	Away captain	Venue	Result
WT20I 882a	17 February	Mary-Anne Musonda	Javeria Khan	Harare Sports Club, Harare	
WT20I 882b	19 February	Mary-Anne Musonda	Javeria Khan	Harare Sports Club, Harare	
WT20I 882c	20 February	Mary-Anne Musonda	Javeria Khan	Harare Sports Club, Harare	

=== Australia in New Zealand ===
T20I series
No.	Date	Home captain	Away captain	Venue	Result
T20I 1123	22 February	Kane Williamson	Aaron Finch	Hagley Oval, Christchurch	New Zealand by 53 runs
T20I 1124	25 February	Kane Williamson	Aaron Finch	University of Otago Oval, Dunedin	New Zealand by 4 runs
T20I 1125	3 March	Kane Williamson	Aaron Finch	Wellington Regional Stadium, Wellington	Australia by 64 runs
T20I 1127	5 March	Kane Williamson	Aaron Finch	Wellington Regional Stadium, Wellington	Australia by 50 runs
T20I 1129	7 March	Kane Williamson	Aaron Finch	Wellington Regional Stadium, Wellington	New Zealand by 7 wickets

=== England women in New Zealand ===
WODI series
No.	Date	Home captain	Away captain	Venue	Result
WODI 1187	23 February	Sophie Devine	Heather Knight	Hagley Oval, Christchurch	England by 8 wickets
WODI 1188	26 February	Sophie Devine	Heather Knight	University of Otago Oval, Dunedin	England by 7 wickets
WODI 1189	28 February	Sophie Devine	Heather Knight	University of Otago Oval, Dunedin	New Zealand by 7 wickets
WT20I series
No.	Date	Home captain	Away captain	Venue	Result
WT20I 883	3 March	Sophie Devine	Heather Knight	Wellington Regional Stadium, Wellington	England by 7 wickets
WT20I 884	5 March	Sophie Devine	Heather Knight	Wellington Regional Stadium, Wellington	England by 6 wickets
WT20I 885	7 March	Sophie Devine	Nat Sciver	Wellington Regional Stadium, Wellington	England by 32 runs

== March ==
=== Zimbabwe vs Afghanistan in the UAE ===
Test series
No.	Date	Home captain	Away captain	Venue	Result
Test 2413	2–6 March	Asghar Afghan	Sean Williams	Sheikh Zayed Cricket Stadium, Abu Dhabi	Zimbabwe by 10 wickets
Test 2415	10–14 March	Asghar Afghan	Sean Williams	Sheikh Zayed Cricket Stadium, Abu Dhabi	Afghanistan by 6 wickets
T20I series
No.	Date	Home captain	Away captain	Venue	Result
T20I 1134	17 March	Asghar Afghan	Sean Williams	Sheikh Zayed Cricket Stadium, Abu Dhabi	Afghanistan by 48 runs
T20I 1136	19 March	Asghar Afghan	Sean Williams	Sheikh Zayed Cricket Stadium, Abu Dhabi	Afghanistan by 45 runs
T20I 1137	20 March	Asghar Afghan	Sean Williams	Sheikh Zayed Cricket Stadium, Abu Dhabi	Afghanistan by 47 runs

=== Sri Lanka in West Indies ===
T20I series
No.	Date	Home captain	Away captain	Venue	Result
T20I 1126	3 March	Kieron Pollard	Angelo Mathews	Coolidge Cricket Ground, Antigua	West Indies by 4 wickets
T20I 1128	5 March	Kieron Pollard	Angelo Mathews	Coolidge Cricket Ground, Antigua	Sri Lanka by 43 runs
T20I 1130	7 March	Kieron Pollard	Angelo Mathews	Coolidge Cricket Ground, Antigua	West Indies by 3 wickets
2020–2023 ICC Cricket World Cup Super League – ODI series
No.	Date	Home captain	Away captain	Venue	Result
ODI 4276	10 March	Kieron Pollard	Dimuth Karunaratne	Sir Vivian Richards Stadium, Antigua	West Indies by 8 wickets
ODI 4277	12 March	Kieron Pollard	Dimuth Karunaratne	Sir Vivian Richards Stadium, Antigua	West Indies by 5 wickets
ODI 4278	14 March	Kieron Pollard	Dimuth Karunaratne	Sir Vivian Richards Stadium, Antigua	West Indies by 5 wickets
Sobers–Tissera Trophy, 2019–2021 ICC World Test Championship – Test series
No.	Date	Home captain	Away captain	Venue	Result
Test 2416	21–25 March	Kraigg Brathwaite	Dimuth Karunaratne	Sir Vivian Richards Stadium, Antigua	Match drawn
Test 2417	29 March–2 April	Kraigg Brathwaite	Dimuth Karunaratne	Sir Vivian Richards Stadium, Antigua	Match drawn

=== South Africa women in India ===
WODI series
No.	Date	Home captain	Away captain	Venue	Result
WODI 1190	7 March	Mithali Raj	Suné Luus	Ekana Cricket Stadium, Lucknow	South Africa by 8 wickets
WODI 1191	9 March	Mithali Raj	Suné Luus	Ekana Cricket Stadium, Lucknow	India by 9 wickets
WODI 1192	12 March	Mithali Raj	Laura Wolvaardt	Ekana Cricket Stadium, Lucknow	South Africa by 6 runs (DLS)
WODI 1193	14 March	Mithali Raj	Laura Wolvaardt	Ekana Cricket Stadium, Lucknow	South Africa by 7 wickets
WODI 1194	17 March	Mithali Raj	Suné Luus	Ekana Cricket Stadium, Lucknow	South Africa by 5 wickets
WT20I series
No.	Date	Home captain	Away captain	Venue	Result
WT20I 886	20 March	Smriti Mandhana	Suné Luus	Ekana Cricket Stadium, Lucknow	South Africa by 8 wickets
WT20I 887	21 March	Smriti Mandhana	Suné Luus	Ekana Cricket Stadium, Lucknow	South Africa by 6 wickets
WT20I 888	23 March	Smriti Mandhana	Suné Luus	Ekana Cricket Stadium, Lucknow	India by 9 wickets

=== Bangladesh in New Zealand ===
2020–2023 ICC Cricket World Cup Super League – ODI series
No.	Date	Home captain	Away captain	Venue	Result
ODI 4279	20 March	Tom Latham	Tamim Iqbal	University of Otago Oval, Dunedin	New Zealand by 8 wickets
ODI 4280	23 March	Tom Latham	Tamim Iqbal	Hagley Oval, Christchurch	New Zealand by 5 wickets
ODI 4282	26 March	Tom Latham	Tamim Iqbal	Basin Reserve, Wellington	New Zealand by 164 runs
T20I series
No.	Date	Home captain	Away captain	Venue	Result
T20I 1139	28 March	Tim Southee	Mahmudullah	Seddon Park, Hamilton	New Zealand by 66 runs
T20I 1140	30 March	Tim Southee	Mahmudullah	McLean Park, Napier	New Zealand by 28 runs (DLS)
T20I 1141	1 April	Tim Southee	Litton Das	Eden Park, Auckland	New Zealand by 65 runs

=== Australia women in New Zealand ===
WT20I series
No.	Date	Home captain	Away captain	Venue	Result
WT20I 889	28 March	Sophie Devine	Meg Lanning	Seddon Park, Hamilton	Australia by 6 wickets
WT20I 890	30 March	Amy Satterthwaite	Meg Lanning	McLean Park, Napier	New Zealand by 4 wickets
WT20I 891	1 April	Amy Satterthwaite	Meg Lanning	Eden Park, Auckland	No result
WODI series
No.	Date	Home captain	Away captain	Venue	Result
WODI 1195	4 April	Amy Satterthwaite	Meg Lanning	Bay Oval, Mount Maunganui	Australia by 6 wickets
WODI 1196	7 April	Amy Satterthwaite	Meg Lanning	Bay Oval, Mount Maunganui	Australia by 71 runs
WODI 1197	10 April	Amy Satterthwaite	Meg Lanning	Bay Oval, Mount Maunganui	Australia by 21 runs

=== 2021 Oman Tri-Nation Series ===
The series was postponed in February 2021 due to the COVID-19 pandemic, and rescheduled for September 2021.

2019–2023 ICC Cricket World Cup League 2 – Tri-series
No.	Date	Team 1	Captain 1	Team 2	Captain 2	Venue	Result
[1st ODI]	March					Al Amerat Cricket Stadium, Oman	
[2nd ODI]	March					Al Amerat Cricket Stadium, Oman	
[3rd ODI]	March					Al Amerat Cricket Stadium, Oman	
[4th ODI]	March					Al Amerat Cricket Stadium, Oman	
[5th ODI]	March					Al Amerat Cricket Stadium, Oman	
[6th ODI]	March					Al Amerat Cricket Stadium, Oman	

=== Australia in South Africa ===
The tour was postponed in February 2021 due to the COVID-19 pandemic.

2019–2021 ICC World Test Championship – Test series
No.	Date	Home captain	Away captain	Venue	Result
[1st Test]	March		Tim Paine		
[2nd Test]	March		Tim Paine		
[3rd Test]	March		Tim Paine		

== April ==
=== Pakistan in South Africa ===
The tour was originally scheduled to be played in October 2020, but postponed in August 2020 due to the COVID-19 pandemic. In October 2020, Cricket South Africa announced that the tour had been rescheduled for April 2021.

2020–2023 ICC Cricket World Cup Super League – ODI series
No.	Date	Home captain	Away captain	Venue	Result
ODI 4285	2 April	Temba Bavuma	Babar Azam	Centurion Park, Centurion	Pakistan by 3 wickets
ODI 4286	4 April	Temba Bavuma	Babar Azam	Wanderers Stadium, Johannesburg	South Africa by 17 runs
ODI 4287	7 April	Temba Bavuma	Babar Azam	Centurion Park, Centurion	Pakistan by 28 runs
T20I series
No.	Date	Home captain	Away captain	Venue	Result
T20I 1145	10 April	Heinrich Klaasen	Babar Azam	Wanderers Stadium, Johannesburg	Pakistan won by 4 wickets
T20I 1146	12 April	Heinrich Klaasen	Babar Azam	Wanderers Stadium, Johannesburg	South Africa by 6 wickets
T20I 1147	14 April	Heinrich Klaasen	Babar Azam	Centurion Park, Centurion	Pakistan by 9 wickets
T20I 1148	16 April	Heinrich Klaasen	Babar Azam	Centurion Park, Centurion	Pakistan by 3 wickets

=== 2021 Papua New Guinea Tri-Nation Series ===
The series was postponed in February 2021 due to the COVID-19 pandemic.

2019–2023 ICC Cricket World Cup League 2 – Tri-series
No.	Date	Team 1	Captain 1	Team 2	Captain 2	Venue	Result
[1st ODI]	April					Amini Park, Port Moresby	
[2nd ODI]	April					Amini Park, Port Moresby	
[3rd ODI]	April					Amini Park, Port Moresby	
[4th ODI]	April					Amini Park, Port Moresby	
[5th ODI]	April					Amini Park, Port Moresby	
[6th ODI]	April					Amini Park, Port Moresby	

=== Bangladesh in Sri Lanka ===
The Test matches were originally scheduled to be played in July and August 2020, but the tour was moved to October 2020, due to the COVID-19 pandemic. However, in September 2020, the tour was postponed again after neither cricket board could agree on the quarantine requirements. In February 2021, the Bangladesh Cricket Board (BCB) announced that they would be touring Sri Lanka in April 2021 to play two Test matches.

2019–2021 ICC World Test Championship – Test series
No.	Date	Home captain	Away captain	Venue	Result
Test 2418	21–25 April	Dimuth Karunaratne	Mominul Haque	Pallekele International Cricket Stadium, Kandy	Match drawn
Test 2419	29 April–3 May	Dimuth Karunaratne	Mominul Haque	Pallekele International Cricket Stadium, Kandy	Sri Lanka by 209 runs

=== Pakistan in Zimbabwe ===
T20I series
No.	Date	Home captain	Away captain	Venue	Result
T20I 1154	21 April	Sean Williams	Babar Azam	Harare Sports Club, Harare	Pakistan by 11 runs
T20I 1156	23 April	Brendan Taylor	Babar Azam	Harare Sports Club, Harare	Zimbabwe by 19 runs
T20I 1158	25 April	Sean Williams	Babar Azam	Harare Sports Club, Harare	Pakistan by 24 runs
Test series
No.	Date	Home captain	Away captain	Venue	Result
Test 2420	29 April–3 May	Brendan Taylor	Babar Azam	Harare Sports Club, Harare	Pakistan by an innings and 116 runs
Test 2421	7–11 May	Brendan Taylor	Babar Azam	Harare Sports Club, Harare	Pakistan by an innings and 147 runs

== See also ==
- Associate international cricket in 2020–21
- Impact of the COVID-19 pandemic on cricket
