= International cricket in 2019–20 =

International cricket season

The 2019–20 international cricket season was from September 2019 to April 2020. 29 Test matches, 78 One Day Internationals (ODIs) and 145 Twenty20 Internationals (T20Is), as well as 23 Women's One Day Internationals (WODIs) and 61 Women's Twenty20 Internationals (WT20Is), were scheduled to be played during this period. Additionally, a number of other T20I/WT20I matches were also scheduled to be played in minor series involving associate nations. The season started with India leading the Test cricket rankings, England leading the ODI rankings and Pakistan leading the Twenty20 rankings. In the women's rankings, Australia women lead both the WODI and WT20I tables. The 2020 ICC Women's T20 World Cup in Australia took place during this time, starting on 21 February 2020, with hosts Australia winning the tournament for the fifth time.

In July 2019, the International Cricket Council (ICC) suspended Zimbabwe Cricket, with the team barred from taking part in ICC events. It was the first time that a Full Member of the ICC had been suspended. As a result of Zimbabwe's suspension, they were replaced in the 2019 ICC Men's T20 World Cup Qualifier tournament with Nigeria. In October 2019, the ICC lifted its suspension on Zimbabwe Cricket, allowing them to take part in future ICC events. The Cricket Association of Nepal, which was suspended in 2016, was also readmitted as an ICC member.

International men's cricket started with a one-off Test between Bangladesh and Afghanistan, which Afghanistan won. During the 2019 United States Tri-Nation Series, the United States recorded their first win in ODIs. During the 2020 Nepal Tri-Nation Series, the United States were bowled out for 35 in their final match against Nepal, which was the joint-lowest innings total in an ODI match. Leagues A and B of the World Cup Challenge League started in this season, with Canada winning the inaugural edition of the League A tournament.

In September 2019, Australia Women won the WODI series against the West Indies Women 3–0, becoming the first team to qualify for the 2021 Women's Cricket World Cup. In October 2019, Australia Women were confirmed as the champions of the 2017–20 ICC Women's Championship, following their win in the second WODI against Sri Lanka Women. Australia went on to win the third WODI by nine wickets, winning the series 3–0, and setting a new record for the most consecutive wins in WODIs, with 18.

In October and November 2019, the 2019 ICC Men's T20 World Cup Qualifier tournament was held in the UAE. Papua New Guinea and Ireland became the first two teams to qualify directly to the 2020 ICC Men's T20 World Cup in Australia, when they won their respective groups. Namibia, the Netherlands, Oman and Scotland also qualified for the 2020 ICC T20 World Cup, with the Netherlands winning the Qualifier tournament. The day after the final of the T20 World Cup Qualifier tournament, the 1,000th men's T20I match was played, between India and Bangladesh, in Delhi.

In December 2019, the Sri Lankan cricket team toured Pakistan playing two Test matches, marking the return of Test cricket in Pakistan after ten years. In February 2020, Bangladesh won the 2020 Under-19 Cricket World Cup, their first win in an ICC event at any level.

The COVID-19 pandemic impacted on several international cricket fixtures and tournaments. A women's quadrangular series was scheduled to take place in Thailand in April 2020, but was cancelled a month before it was due to start. The 2020 Malaysia Cricket World Cup Challenge League A, scheduled to take place in March 2020, was postponed, along with two T20I matches between a World XI and Asia XI side. Australia Women's tour to South Africa in March 2020 became the first major international series not to go ahead as planned due to coronavirus. On 13 March 2020, the ICC confirmed that the 2020 United States Tri-Nation Series had been postponed due to the outbreak and travel restrictions to the United States. On the same day, the two-match Test series between Sri Lanka and England, scheduled to be played in March 2020, was also postponed. The last two ODIs between India and South Africa were cancelled, along with the Netherlands' tour to Namibia. On 14 March 2020, Australia cancelled the final two ODIs and their T20I series against New Zealand. On 16 March 2020, the Pakistan Cricket Board cancelled the third leg of the series against Bangladesh, which was scheduled to have a one-off ODI and a Test match. Later the same day, Ireland's tour to Zimbabwe was also cancelled. On 24 March 2020, the ICC confirmed that all ICC qualifying events scheduled to take place before 30 June 2020 had been postponed.

== Season overview ==
Men's international tours
Start date	Home team	Away team	Results [Matches]		
Start date	Home team	Away team	Test	ODI	T20I
5 September 2019	Bangladesh	Afghanistan	0–1 [1]	—	—
15 September 2019 (Note: The final two ODIs were cancelled due to the COVID-19 pandemic.)	India	South Africa	3–0 [3]	0–0 [3]	1–1 [3]
27 September 2019	Pakistan	Sri Lanka	1–0 [2]	2–0 [3]	0–3 [3]
27 October 2019	Australia	Sri Lanka	—	—	3–0 [3]
1 November 2019	New Zealand	England	1–0 [2]	—	2–3 [5]
3 November 2019	Australia	Pakistan	2–0 [2]	—	2–0 [3]
3 November 2019	India	Bangladesh	2–0 [2]	—	2–1 [3]
6 November 2019	(India) Afghanistan	West Indies	0–1 [1]	0–3 [3]	2–1 [3]
6 December 2019	India	West Indies	—	2–1 [3]	2–1 [3]
12 December 2019	Australia	New Zealand	3–0 [3]	1–0 [3]	—
26 December 2019	South Africa	England	1–3 [4]	1–1 [3]	1–2 [3]
5 January 2020	India	Sri Lanka	—	—	2–0 [3]
7 January 2020	West Indies	Ireland	—	3–0 [3]	1–1 [3]
14 January 2020	India	Australia	—	2–1 [3]	—
19 January 2020	Zimbabwe	Sri Lanka	0–1 [2]	—	—
24 January 2020	New Zealand	India	2–0 [2]	3–0 [3]	0–5 [5]
24 January 2020 (Note: The one-off ODI and the second Test were cancelled due to the COVID-19 pandemic.)	Pakistan	Bangladesh	1–0 [2]	[1]	2–0 [3]
21 February 2020	South Africa	Australia	—	3–0 [3]	1–2 [3]
22 February 2020	Bangladesh	Zimbabwe	1–0 [1]	3–0 [3]	2–0 [2]
22 February 2020	Sri Lanka	West Indies	—	3–0 [3]	0–2 [2]
6 March 2020	(India) Afghanistan	Ireland	—	—	2–1 [3]
19 March 2020 (Note: The two-match Test series was scheduled to take place, but was cancelled due to the COVID-19 pandemic.)	Sri Lanka	England	[2]	—	—
21 March 2020 (Note: The two-match T20I series was scheduled to take place, but was cancelled due to the COVID-19 pandemic.)		World XI	—	—	[2]
24 March 2020 (Note: The T20I series was cancelled due to the COVID-19 pandemic.)	New Zealand	Australia	—	—	[3]
25 March 2020 (Note: The tour was scheduled to take place, but was cancelled due to the COVID-19 pandemic.)	Namibia	Netherlands	—	[2]	[4]
2 April 2020 (Note: The tour was cancelled due to the COVID-19 pandemic.)	Zimbabwe	Ireland	—	[3]	[3]
Men's international tournaments
Start date	Tournament			Winners	
13 September 2019	2019–20 Bangladesh Tri-Nation Series			Bangladesh and Afghanistan	
13 September 2019	2019 United States Tri-Nation Series			—N/a	
15 September 2019	2019–20 Ireland Tri-Nation Series			Ireland	
16 September 2019	2019 Malaysia Cricket World Cup Challenge League A			—N/a	
27 September 2019	2019–20 Singapore Tri-Nation Series			Zimbabwe	
5 October 2019	2019–20 Oman Pentangular Series			Oman	
18 October 2019	(United Arab Emirates) 2019 ICC Men's T20 World Cup Qualifier			Netherlands	
2 December 2019	2019 Oman Cricket World Cup Challenge League B			—N/a	
8 December 2019	2019 United Arab Emirates Tri-Nation Series			—N/a	
5 January 2020	2020 Oman Tri-Nation Series			—N/a	
17 January 2020	(South Africa) 2020 Under-19 Cricket World Cup			Bangladesh	
5 February 2020	2020 Nepal Tri-Nation Series			—N/a	
1 April 2020 (Note: The ODI series was scheduled to take place, but was cancelled due to the COVID-19 pandemic.)	2020 United States Tri-Nation Series			—N/a	
20 April 2020	2020 Namibia Tri-Nation Series			—N/a	

Women's international tours
Start date	Home team	Away team	Results [Matches]		
Start date	Home team	Away team	WTest	WODI	WT20I
5 September 2019	West Indies	Australia	—	0–3 [3]	0–3 [3]
24 September 2019	India	South Africa	—	3–0 [3]	3–1 [6]
29 September 2019	Australia	Sri Lanka	—	3–0 [3]	3–0 [3]
26 October 2019	Pakistan	Bangladesh	—	1–1 [2]	3–0 [3]
1 November 2019	West Indies	India	—	1–2 [3]	0–5 [5]
9 December 2019	(Malaysia) Pakistan	England	—	0–2 [3]	0–3 [3]
25 January 2020	New Zealand	South Africa	—	0–3 [3]	3–1 [5]
22 March 2020	South Africa	Australia	—	[3]	[3]
Women's international tournaments
Start date	Tournament			Winners	
31 January 2020	2020 Australia women's Tri-Nation Series			Australia	
21 February 2020	(Australia) 2020 ICC Women's T20 World Cup			Australia	
3 April 2020 (Note: The quadrangular series was scheduled to take place, but was cancelled due to the COVID-19 pandemic.)	2020 Thailand Women's Quadrangular Series			—N/a	

== Rankings ==
The following were the rankings at the beginning of the season.

ICC Men's Test Team Rankings 27 August 2019
Rank	Team	Matches	Points	Rating
1	India	32	3,631	113
2	New Zealand	26	2,829	109
3	South Africa	27	2,917	108
4	England	35	3,663	105
5	Australia	27	2,640	98
6	Sri Lanka	40	3,795	95
7	Pakistan	27	2,263	84
8	West Indies	29	2,381	82
9	Bangladesh	25	1,898	65
10	Zimbabwe	9	140	16
Series in progress on 1 September are not included in this table

ICC Men's ODI Team Rankings 22 August 2019
Rank	Team	Matches	Points	Rating
1	England	54	6,745	125
2	India	58	7,071	122
3	New Zealand	43	4,837	112
4	Australia	50	5,543	111
5	South Africa	47	5,193	110
6	Pakistan	49	4,756	97
7	Bangladesh	46	3,963	86
8	Sri Lanka	54	4,425	82
9	West Indies	49	3,740	76
10	Afghanistan	40	2,359	59
11	Ireland	29	1,466	51
12	Zimbabwe	35	1,538	44
13	Netherlands	6	222	37
14	Scotland	15	534	36
15	Oman	8	174	22
16	Nepal	8	152	19
Only the top 16 teams are shown

ICC Men's T20I Team Rankings 26 August 2019
Rank	Team	Matches	Points	Rating
1	Pakistan	26	7,365	283
2	England	16	4,253	266
3	South Africa	16	4,196	262
4	India	31	8,099	261
5	Australia	21	5,471	261
6	New Zealand	16	4,056	254
7	Afghanistan	16	3,849	241
8	Sri Lanka	18	4,093	227
9	West Indies	24	5,378	224
10	Bangladesh	16	3,525	220
11	Nepal	14	2,818	201
12	Scotland	11	2,185	199
13	United Arab Emirates	18	3,486	194
14	Zimbabwe	13	2,376	183
15	Ireland	21	3,817	182
16	Netherlands	15	2,710	181
Only the top 16 teams are shown

ICC Women's ODI Rankings 6 August 2019
Rank	Team	Matches	Points	Rating
1	Australia	28	4,121	147
2	India	33	4,018	122
3	England	36	4,368	121
4	New Zealand	33	3,714	113
5	South Africa	42	4,097	98
6	West Indies	25	2,139	86
7	Pakistan	29	2,272	78
8	Sri Lanka	29	1,617	56
9	Bangladesh	13	632	49
10	Ireland	10	211	21

ICC Women's T20I Rankings 20 August 2019
Rank	Team	Matches	Points	Rating
1	Australia	31	8,819	284
2	England	34	9,448	278
3	New Zealand	32	8,837	276
4	West Indies	31	8,086	261
5	India	38	9,504	250
6	South Africa	33	8,015	243
7	Pakistan	39	8,874	228
8	Sri Lanka	32	6,569	205
9	Bangladesh	31	5,913	191
10	Ireland	25	4,368	175
11	Zimbabwe	28	4,337	155
12	Thailand	46	7,025	153
13	Scotland	18	2,696	150
14	Nepal	19	2,425	128
15	Papua New Guinea	15	1,899	127
16	United Arab Emirates	27	3,381	125
Only the top 16 teams are shown

=== On-going tournaments ===
The following were the rankings at the beginning of the season.

2019–2021 ICC World Test Championship
Rank	Team	Series	Points
1	India	1	120
2	New Zealand	1	60
3	Sri Lanka	1	60
4	Australia	1	56
5	England	1	56
6	Bangladesh	0	0
7	Pakistan	0	0
8	South Africa	0	0
9	West Indies	1	0
Full Table

2019–2023 ICC Cricket World Cup League 2
Rank	Team	Matches	Points
1	Scotland	4	6
2	Oman	4	6
3	Namibia	0	0
4	Nepal	0	0
5	United Arab Emirates	0	0
6	United States	0	0
7	Papua New Guinea	4	0
Full Table

2017–20 ICC Women's Championship
Rank	Team	Matches	Points
1	England	18	24
2	Australia	12	22
3	India	15	16
4	South Africa	15	16
5	Pakistan	15	15
6	New Zealand	15	14
7	West Indies	15	11
8	Sri Lanka	15	2
Full Table

== September ==
=== Afghanistan in Bangladesh ===
Only Test
No.	Date	Home captain	Away captain	Venue	Result
Test 2361	5–9 September	Shakib Al Hasan	Rashid Khan	Zohur Ahmed Chowdhury Stadium, Chittagong	Afghanistan by 224 runs

=== Australia women in West Indies ===
2017–20 ICC Women's Championship – WODI series
No.	Date	Home captain	Away captain	Venue	Result
WODI 1161	5 September	Stafanie Taylor	Meg Lanning	Coolidge Cricket Ground, Antigua	Australia by 178 runs
WODI 1162	8 September	Stafanie Taylor	Rachael Haynes	Sir Vivian Richards Stadium, Antigua	Australia by 151 runs
WODI 1163	11 September	Stafanie Taylor	Meg Lanning	Sir Vivian Richards Stadium, Antigua	Australia by 8 wickets
WT20I series
No.	Date	Home captain	Away captain	Venue	Result
WT20I 758	14 September	Stafanie Taylor	Meg Lanning	Kensington Oval, Bridgetown	Australia by 6 wickets
WT20I 759	16 September	Stafanie Taylor	Meg Lanning	Kensington Oval, Bridgetown	Australia by 9 wickets
WT20I 760	18 September	Stafanie Taylor	Meg Lanning	Kensington Oval, Bridgetown	Australia by 9 wickets

=== 2019–20 Bangladesh Tri-Nation Series ===
Pos	Team	Pld	W	L	T	NR	Pts	NRR
1	Bangladesh	4	3	1	0	0	6	0.378
2	Afghanistan	4	2	2	0	0	4	0.493
3	Zimbabwe	4	1	3	0	0	2	−0.885

Tri-Nation Series
No.	Date	Team 1	Captain 1	Team 2	Captain 2	Venue	Result
T20I 881	13 September	Bangladesh	Shakib Al Hasan	Zimbabwe	Hamilton Masakadza	Sher-e-Bangla National Cricket Stadium, Dhaka	Bangladesh by 3 wickets
T20I 882	14 September	Afghanistan	Rashid Khan	Zimbabwe	Hamilton Masakadza	Sher-e-Bangla National Cricket Stadium, Dhaka	Afghanistan by 28 runs
T20I 883	15 September	Bangladesh	Shakib Al Hasan	Afghanistan	Rashid Khan	Sher-e-Bangla National Cricket Stadium, Dhaka	Afghanistan by 25 runs
T20I 886	18 September	Bangladesh	Shakib Al Hasan	Zimbabwe	Hamilton Masakadza	Zohur Ahmed Chowdhury Stadium, Chittagong	Bangladesh by 39 runs
T20I 890	20 September	Afghanistan	Rashid Khan	Zimbabwe	Hamilton Masakadza	Zohur Ahmed Chowdhury Stadium, Chittagong	Zimbabwe by 7 wickets
T20I 892	21 September	Bangladesh	Shakib Al Hasan	Afghanistan	Rashid Khan	Zohur Ahmed Chowdhury Stadium, Chittagong	Bangladesh by 4 wickets
Final
T20I 893a	24 September	Bangladesh	Shakib Al Hasan	Afghanistan	Rashid Khan	Sher-e-Bangla National Cricket Stadium, Dhaka	Match abandoned

=== 2019 United States Tri-Nation Series ===
2019–2023 ICC Cricket World Cup League 2 – Tri-series
No.	Date	Team 1	Captain 1	Team 2	Captain 2	Venue	Result
ODI 4205	13 September	United States	Saurabh Netravalkar	Papua New Guinea	Assad Vala	Central Broward Regional Park, Lauderhill	United States by 5 runs (DLS)
ODI 4206	17 September	United States	Saurabh Netravalkar	Namibia	Gerhard Erasmus	Central Broward Regional Park, Lauderhill	United States by 5 wickets
ODI 4207	19 September	United States	Saurabh Netravalkar	Papua New Guinea	Assad Vala	Central Broward Regional Park, Lauderhill	United States by 62 runs
ODI 4208	20 September	United States	Saurabh Netravalkar	Namibia	Gerhard Erasmus	Central Broward Regional Park, Lauderhill	Namibia by 139 runs (DLS)
ODI 4209	22 September	Namibia	Gerhard Erasmus	Papua New Guinea	Assad Vala	Central Broward Regional Park, Lauderhill	Namibia by 4 wickets
ODI 4210	23 September	Namibia	Gerhard Erasmus	Papua New Guinea	Assad Vala	Central Broward Regional Park, Lauderhill	Namibia by 27 runs

=== 2019–20 Ireland Tri-Nation Series ===
Pos	Team	Pld	W	L	T	NR	Pts	NRR
1	Ireland	4	2	1	0	1	10	0.247
2	Scotland	4	2	2	0	0	8	1.335
3	Netherlands	4	1	2	0	1	6	−2.031

T20I Tri-series
No.	Date	Team 1	Captain 1	Team 2	Captain 2	Venue	Result
T20I 883a	15 September	Ireland	Gary Wilson	Netherlands	Pieter Seelaar	The Village, Dublin	Match abandoned
T20I 884	16 September	Scotland	Kyle Coetzer	Netherlands	Pieter Seelaar	The Village, Dublin	Scotland by 58 runs
T20I 885	17 September	Ireland	Gary Wilson	Scotland	Kyle Coetzer	The Village, Dublin	Ireland by 4 wickets
T20I 887	18 September	Ireland	Gary Wilson	Netherlands	Pieter Seelaar	The Village, Dublin	Netherlands by 6 wickets
T20I 889	19 September	Scotland	Kyle Coetzer	Netherlands	Pieter Seelaar	The Village, Dublin	Scotland by 6 wickets
T20I 891	20 September	Ireland	Gary Wilson	Scotland	Richie Berrington	The Village, Dublin	Ireland by 1 run

=== South Africa in India ===
The last two ODI matches were cancelled in March 2020 due to the COVID-19 pandemic.

T20I series
No.	Date	Home captain	Away captain	Venue	Result
T20I 883b	15 September	Virat Kohli	Quinton de Kock	Himachal Pradesh Cricket Association Stadium, Dharamshala	Match abandoned
T20I 888	18 September	Virat Kohli	Quinton de Kock	Inderjit Singh Bindra Stadium, Mohali	India by 7 wickets
T20I 893	22 September	Virat Kohli	Quinton de Kock	M. Chinnaswamy Stadium, Bengaluru	South Africa by 9 wickets
2019–2021 ICC World Test Championship – Test series
No.	Date	Home captain	Away captain	Venue	Result
Test 2363	2–6 October	Virat Kohli	Faf du Plessis	ACA–VDCA Cricket Stadium, Visakhapatnam	India by 203 runs
Test 2364	10–14 October	Virat Kohli	Faf du Plessis	Maharashtra Cricket Association Stadium, Pune	India by an innings and 137 runs
Test 2365	19–23 October	Virat Kohli	Faf du Plessis	JSCA International Stadium Complex, Ranchi	India by an innings and 202 runs
ODI series
No.	Date	Home captain	Away captain	Venue	Result
ODI 4254a	12 March	Virat Kohli	Quinton de Kock	Himachal Pradesh Cricket Association Stadium, Dharamshala	Match abandoned
ODI 4255b	15 March	Virat Kohli	Quinton de Kock	Ekana Cricket Stadium, Lucknow	
ODI 4255c	18 March	Virat Kohli	Quinton de Kock	Eden Gardens, Kolkata	

=== 2019 Malaysia Cricket World Cup Challenge League A ===
2019–2022 ICC Cricket World Cup Challenge League – List A series
No.	Date	Team 1	Captain 1	Team 2	Captain 2	Venue	Result
1st List A	16 September	Denmark	Hamid Shah	Malaysia	Ahmad Faiz	Kinrara Academy Oval, Kuala Lumpur	Malaysia by 44 runs
2nd List A	17 September	Singapore	Amjad Mahboob	Qatar	Iqbal Hussain	Kinrara Academy Oval, Kuala Lumpur	Qatar by 19 runs
3rd List A	17 September	Canada	Navneet Dhaliwal	Vanuatu	Andrew Mansale	Selangor Turf Club, Selangor	Canada by 5 wickets
4th List A	19 September	Canada	Navneet Dhaliwal	Malaysia	Ahmad Faiz	Kinrara Academy Oval, Kuala Lumpur	Canada by 206 runs
5th List A	19 September	Singapore	Rezza Gaznavi	Denmark	Hamid Shah	Selangor Turf Club, Selangor	Singapore by 36 runs
6th List A	20 September	Denmark	Hamid Shah	Vanuatu	Andrew Mansale	Kinrara Academy Oval, Kuala Lumpur	Denmark by 148 runs
7th List A	20 September	Malaysia	Ahmad Faiz	Qatar	Iqbal Hussain	Selangor Turf Club, Selangor	Qatar by 3 wickets
8th List A	22 September	Canada	Navneet Dhaliwal	Qatar	Iqbal Hussain	Kinrara Academy Oval, Kuala Lumpur	Canada by 115 runs
9th List A	22 September	Singapore	Amjad Mahboob	Vanuatu	Andrew Mansale	Selangor Turf Club, Selangor	Singapore by 42 runs
10th List A	23 September	Singapore	Amjad Mahboob	Malaysia	Ahmad Faiz	Kinrara Academy Oval, Kuala Lumpur	Singapore by 4 wickets
11th List A	23 September	Denmark	Hamid Shah	Qatar	Iqbal Hussain	Selangor Turf Club, Selangor	Denmark by 60 runs
12th List A	25 September	Canada	Nitish Kumar	Denmark	Hamid Shah	Kinrara Academy Oval, Kuala Lumpur	Canada by 48 runs (DLS)
13th List A	25 September	Malaysia	Ahmad Faiz	Vanuatu	Andrew Mansale	Selangor Turf Club, Selangor	Vanuatu by 13 runs
14th List A	26 September	Vanuatu	Andrew Mansale	Qatar	Iqbal Hussain	Kinrara Academy Oval, Kuala Lumpur	Qatar by 5 runs (DLS)
15th List A	26 September	Canada	Nitish Kumar	Singapore	Amjad Mahboob	Selangor Turf Club, Selangor	Singapore by 4 runs (DLS)

=== South Africa women in India ===
WT20I series
No.	Date	Home captain	Away captain	Venue	Result
WT20I 769	24 September	Harmanpreet Kaur	Suné Luus	Lalabhai Contractor Stadium, Surat	India by 11 runs
WT20I 769a	26 September	Harmanpreet Kaur	Suné Luus	Lalabhai Contractor Stadium, Surat	Match abandoned
WT20I 770a	29 September	Harmanpreet Kaur	Suné Luus	Lalabhai Contractor Stadium, Surat	Match abandoned
WT20I 772	1 October	Harmanpreet Kaur	Suné Luus	Lalabhai Contractor Stadium, Surat	India by 51 runs
WT20I 775	3 October	Harmanpreet Kaur	Suné Luus	Lalabhai Contractor Stadium, Surat	India by 5 wickets
WT20I 779	4 October	Harmanpreet Kaur	Suné Luus	Lalabhai Contractor Stadium, Surat	South Africa by 105 runs
WODI series
No.	Date	Home captain	Away captain	Venue	Result
WODI 1167	9 October	Mithali Raj	Suné Luus	Reliance Stadium, Vadodara	India by 8 wickets
WODI 1168	11 October	Mithali Raj	Suné Luus	Reliance Stadium, Vadodara	India by 5 wickets
WODI 1169	14 October	Mithali Raj	Suné Luus	Reliance Stadium, Vadodara	India by 6 runs

=== 2019–20 Singapore Tri-Nation Series ===
Pos	Team	Pld	W	L	T	NR	Pts	NRR
1	Zimbabwe	4	3	1	0	0	6	0.833
2	Nepal	4	1	2	0	1	3	−0.383
3	Singapore (H)	4	1	2	0	1	3	−0.871

(H) Host

Tri-Nation Series
No.	Date	Team 1	Captain 1	Team 2	Captain 2	Venue	Result
T20I 894	27 September	Nepal	Paras Khadka	Zimbabwe	Sean Williams	Indian Association Ground, Singapore	Zimbabwe by 5 wickets
T20I 895	28 September	Nepal	Paras Khadka	Singapore	Tim David	Indian Association Ground, Singapore	Nepal by 9 wickets
T20I 897	29 September	Singapore	Amjad Mahboob	Zimbabwe	Sean Williams	Indian Association Ground, Singapore	Singapore by 4 runs
T20I 899	1 October	Zimbabwe	Sean Williams	Nepal	Paras Khadka	Indian Association Ground, Singapore	Zimbabwe by 40 runs
T20I 900a	2 October	Singapore	Amjad Mahboob	Nepal	Paras Khadka	Indian Association Ground, Singapore	Match abandoned
T20I 902	3 October	Zimbabwe	Sean Williams	Singapore	Tim David	Indian Association Ground, Singapore	Zimbabwe by 8 wickets

=== Sri Lanka in Pakistan ===
ODI series
No.	Date	Home captain	Away captain	Venue	Result
ODI 4210a	27 September	Sarfaraz Ahmed	Lahiru Thirimanne	National Stadium, Karachi	Match abandoned
ODI 4211	30 September	Sarfaraz Ahmed	Lahiru Thirimanne	National Stadium, Karachi	Pakistan by 67 runs
ODI 4212	2 October	Sarfaraz Ahmed	Lahiru Thirimanne	National Stadium, Karachi	Pakistan by 5 wickets
T20I series
No.	Date	Home captain	Away captain	Venue	Result
T20I 914	5 October	Sarfaraz Ahmed	Dasun Shanaka	Gaddafi Stadium, Lahore	Sri Lanka by 64 runs
T20I 922	7 October	Sarfaraz Ahmed	Dasun Shanaka	Gaddafi Stadium, Lahore	Sri Lanka by 35 runs
T20I 925	9 October	Sarfaraz Ahmed	Dasun Shanaka	Gaddafi Stadium, Lahore	Sri Lanka by 13 runs
2019–2021 ICC World Test Championship – Test series
No.	Date	Home captain	Away captain	Venue	Result
Test 2373	11–15 December	Azhar Ali	Dimuth Karunaratne	Rawalpindi Cricket Stadium, Rawalpindi	Match drawn
Test 2375	19–23 December	Azhar Ali	Dimuth Karunaratne	National Stadium, Karachi	Pakistan by 263 runs

=== Sri Lanka women in Australia ===
WT20I series
No.	Date	Home captain	Away captain	Venue	Result
WT20I 770	29 September	Meg Lanning	Shashikala Siriwardene	North Sydney Oval, Sydney	Australia by 41 runs
WT20I 771	30 September	Meg Lanning	Shashikala Siriwardene	North Sydney Oval, Sydney	Australia by 9 wickets
WT20I 773	2 October	Meg Lanning	Shashikala Siriwardene	North Sydney Oval, Sydney	Australia by 132 runs
2017–20 ICC Women's Championship – WODI series
No.	Date	Home captain	Away captain	Venue	Result
WODI 1164	5 October	Meg Lanning	Chamari Athapaththu	Allan Border Field, Brisbane	Australia by 157 runs
WODI 1165	7 October	Meg Lanning	Chamari Athapaththu	Allan Border Field, Brisbane	Australia by 110 runs
WODI 1166	9 October	Meg Lanning	Chamari Athapaththu	Allan Border Field, Brisbane	Australia by 9 wickets

== October ==
=== 2019–20 Oman Pentangular Series ===
Pos	Team	Pld	W	L	T	NR	Pts	NRR
1	Oman (H)	4	4	0	0	0	8	2.268
2	Ireland	4	3	1	0	0	6	0.648
3	Nepal	4	2	2	0	0	4	−0.731
4	Netherlands	4	1	3	0	0	2	−0.208
5	Hong Kong	4	0	4	0	0	0	−2.070

(H) Host

No.	Date	Team 1	Captain 1	Team 2	Captain 2	Venue	Result
T20I 910	5 October	Oman	Zeeshan Maqsood	Hong Kong	Kinchit Shah	Al Amerat Cricket Stadium, Muscat	Oman by 7 wickets
T20I 911	5 October	Ireland	Gary Wilson	Netherlands	Pieter Seelaar	Al Amerat Cricket Stadium, Muscat	Ireland by 6 wickets
T20I 917	6 October	Oman	Zeeshan Maqsood	Ireland	Gary Wilson	Al Amerat Cricket Stadium, Muscat	Oman by 43 runs
T20I 918	6 October	Nepal	Paras Khadka	Hong Kong	Kinchit Shah	Al Amerat Cricket Stadium, Muscat	Nepal by 4 wickets
T20I 920	7 October	Netherlands	Pieter Seelaar	Nepal	Paras Khadka	Al Amerat Cricket Stadium, Muscat	Nepal by 4 wickets
T20I 921	7 October	Hong Kong	Kinchit Shah	Ireland	Gary Wilson	Al Amerat Cricket Stadium, Muscat	Ireland by 66 runs
T20I 923	9 October	Ireland	Gary Wilson	Nepal	Paras Khadka	Al Amerat Cricket Stadium, Muscat	Ireland by 13 runs
T20I 924	9 October	Oman	Zeeshan Maqsood	Netherlands	Pieter Seelaar	Al Amerat Cricket Stadium, Muscat	Oman by 7 wickets
T20I 927	10 October	Hong Kong	Kinchit Shah	Netherlands	Pieter Seelaar	Al Amerat Cricket Stadium, Muscat	Netherlands by 37 runs
T20I 928	10 October	Oman	Zeeshan Maqsood	Nepal	Paras Khadka	Al Amerat Cricket Stadium, Muscat	Oman by 6 wickets

=== 2019 ICC Men's T20 World Cup Qualifier ===
Pos	Team	Pld	W	L	T	NR	Pts	NRR
1	Papua New Guinea	6	5	1	0	0	10	2.086
2	Netherlands	6	5	1	0	0	10	1.776
3	Namibia	6	4	2	0	0	8	1.080
4	Scotland	6	3	3	0	0	6	0.258
5	Kenya	6	2	4	0	0	4	−1.156
6	Singapore	6	2	4	0	0	4	−1.375
7	Bermuda	6	0	6	0	0	0	−2.839

Source: ESPNCricinfo

Advanced to Semifinal and 2021 Men's T20 World Cup.
Advanced to Semi-final Play-offs.
Advanced to 5th place Play-off Semi-Finals.

Pos	Team	Pld	W	L	T	NR	Pts	NRR
1	Ireland	6	4	2	0	0	8	1.591
2	Oman	6	4	2	0	0	8	0.997
3	United Arab Emirates	6	4	2	0	0	8	0.682
4	Hong Kong	6	3	3	0	0	6	0.480
5	Canada	6	3	3	0	0	6	0.240
6	Jersey	6	3	3	0	0	6	0.089
7	Nigeria	6	0	6	0	0	0	−4.673

Source: ESPNCricinfo

Advanced to Semifinal and 2021 Men's T20 World Cup.
Advanced to Semi-final Play-offs.
Advanced to 5th place Play-off Semi-Finals.

Group stage
No.	Date	Team 1	Captain 1	Team 2	Captain 2	Venue	Result
T20I 935	18 October	Scotland	Kyle Coetzer	Singapore	Amjad Mahboob	ICC Academy Ground, Dubai	Singapore by 2 runs
T20I 936	18 October	Hong Kong	Aizaz Khan	Ireland	Gary Wilson	Sheikh Zayed Cricket Stadium, Abu Dhabi	Ireland by 8 wickets
T20I 937	18 October	Kenya	Shem Ngoche	Netherlands	Pieter Seelaar	ICC Academy Ground, Dubai	Netherlands by 30 runs
T20I 939	18 October	Oman	Zeeshan Maqsood	United Arab Emirates	Ahmed Raza	Sheikh Zayed Cricket Stadium, Abu Dhabi	Oman by 7 wickets
T20I 940	19 October	Bermuda	Dion Stovell	Papua New Guinea	Assad Vala	ICC Academy Ground, Dubai	Papua New Guinea by 10 wickets
T20I 941	19 October	Jersey	Charles Perchard	Nigeria	Ademola Onikoyi	Sheikh Zayed Cricket Stadium, Abu Dhabi	Jersey by 69 runs
T20I 942	19 October	Namibia	Gerhard Erasmus	Netherlands	Pieter Seelaar	ICC Academy Ground, Dubai	Netherlands by 44 runs
T20I 943	19 October	Kenya	Shem Ngoche	Scotland	Kyle Coetzer	ICC Academy Ground No 2, Dubai	Scotland by 31 runs
T20I 944	19 October	Ireland	Gary Wilson	United Arab Emirates	Ahmed Raza	Sheikh Zayed Cricket Stadium, Abu Dhabi	United Arab Emirates by 5 wickets
T20I 946	20 October	Namibia	Gerhard Erasmus	Papua New Guinea	Assad Vala	ICC Academy Ground No 2, Dubai	Papua New Guinea by 81 runs
T20I 947	20 October	Canada	Navneet Dhaliwal	Jersey	Charles Perchard	Tolerance Oval, Abu Dhabi	Canada by 53 runs
T20I 948	20 October	Bermuda	Dion Stovell	Singapore	Amjad Mahboob	ICC Academy Ground No 2, Dubai	Singapore by 5 wickets
T20I 949	20 October	Hong Kong	Aizaz Khan	Oman	Zeeshan Maqsood	Sheikh Zayed Cricket Stadium, Abu Dhabi	Oman by 7 wickets
T20I 950	21 October	Papua New Guinea	Assad Vala	Scotland	Kyle Coetzer	ICC Academy Ground, Dubai	Scotland by 4 runs
T20I 951	21 October	Hong Kong	Aizaz Khan	United Arab Emirates	Ahmed Raza	Sheikh Zayed Cricket Stadium, Abu Dhabi	United Arab Emirates by 8 wickets
T20I 952	21 October	Ireland	Gary Wilson	Oman	Zeeshan Maqsood	Tolerance Oval, Abu Dhabi	Ireland by 35 runs
T20I 953	21 October	Bermuda	Dion Stovell	Kenya	Shem Ngoche	ICC Academy Ground, Dubai	Kenya by 45 runs
T20I 954	21 October	Canada	Navneet Dhaliwal	Nigeria	Ademola Onikoyi	Sheikh Zayed Cricket Stadium, Abu Dhabi	Canada by 50 runs
T20I 955	22 October	Namibia	Gerhard Erasmus	Scotland	Richie Berrington	ICC Academy Ground, Dubai	Namibia by 24 runs
T20I 956	22 October	Netherlands	Pieter Seelaar	Singapore	Amjad Mahboob	ICC Academy Ground, Dubai	Netherlands by 5 wickets
T20I 957	22 October	Jersey	Charles Perchard	United Arab Emirates	Ahmed Raza	Tolerance Oval, Abu Dhabi	Jersey by 35 runs
T20I 958	23 October	Bermuda	Rodney Trott	Namibia	Gerhard Erasmus	ICC Academy Ground No 2, Dubai	Namibia by 6 wickets
T20I 959	23 October	Nigeria	Ademola Onikoyi	Oman	Zeeshan Maqsood	Tolerance Oval, Abu Dhabi	Oman by 7 wickets
T20I 960	23 October	Kenya	Shem Ngoche	Singapore	Amjad Mahboob	ICC Academy Ground No 2, Dubai	Kenya by 7 wickets
T20I 961	23 October	Canada	Navneet Dhaliwal	Ireland	Gary Wilson	Sheikh Zayed Cricket Stadium, Abu Dhabi	Canada by 10 runs
T20I 962	23 October	Hong Kong	Aizaz Khan	Jersey	Charles Perchard	Sheikh Zayed Cricket Stadium, Abu Dhabi	Hong Kong by 8 runs
T20I 963	24 October	Netherlands	Pieter Seelaar	Papua New Guinea	Assad Vala	ICC Academy Ground, Dubai	Papua New Guinea by 5 wickets
T20I 964	24 October	Nigeria	Ademola Onikoyi	United Arab Emirates	Ahmed Raza	Tolerance Oval, Abu Dhabi	United Arab Emirates by 5 wickets
T20I 965	24 October	Canada	Navneet Dhaliwal	Hong Kong	Aizaz Khan	Tolerance Oval, Abu Dhabi	Hong Kong by 32 runs
T20I 966	24 October	Bermuda	Rodney Trott	Scotland	Kyle Coetzer	Dubai International Cricket Stadium, Dubai	Scotland by 46 runs
T20I 967	25 October	Papua New Guinea	Assad Vala	Singapore	Amjad Mahboob	Dubai International Cricket Stadium, Dubai	Papua New Guinea by 43 runs
T20I 968	25 October	Ireland	Gary Wilson	Jersey	Charles Perchard	Tolerance Oval, Abu Dhabi	Ireland by 8 wickets
T20I 969	25 October	Kenya	Shem Ngoche	Namibia	Gerhard Erasmus	Dubai International Cricket Stadium, Dubai	Namibia by 87 runs
T20I 971	25 October	Canada	Navneet Dhaliwal	Oman	Zeeshan Maqsood	Sheikh Zayed Cricket Stadium, Abu Dhabi	Oman by 8 wickets
T20I 972	26 October	Ireland	Gary Wilson	Nigeria	Ademola Onikoyi	Sheikh Zayed Cricket Stadium, Abu Dhabi	Ireland by 8 wickets
T20I 974	26 October	Bermuda	Rodney Trott	Netherlands	Pieter Seelaar	Dubai International Cricket Stadium, Dubai	Netherlands by 92 runs
T20I 977	26 October	Namibia	Gerhard Erasmus	Singapore	Amjad Mahboob	Dubai International Cricket Stadium, Dubai	Namibia by 87 runs
T20I 979	27 October	Kenya	Shem Ngoche	Papua New Guinea	Assad Vala	Dubai International Cricket Stadium, Dubai	Papua New Guinea by 45 runs
T20I 980	27 October	Hong Kong	Aizaz Khan	Nigeria	Ademola Onikoyi	Tolerance Oval, Abu Dhabi	Hong Kong by 5 wickets
T20I 982	27 October	Jersey	Charles Perchard	Oman	Zeeshan Maqsood	Sheikh Zayed Cricket Stadium, Abu Dhabi	Jersey by 14 runs
T20I 983	27 October	Netherlands	Pieter Seelaar	Scotland	Kyle Coetzer	Dubai International Cricket Stadium, Dubai	Netherlands by 4 wickets
T20I 985	27 October	Canada	Navneet Dhaliwal	United Arab Emirates	Ahmed Raza	Sheikh Zayed Cricket Stadium, Abu Dhabi	United Arab Emirates by 14 runs
Playoffs
T20I 986	29 October	Netherlands	Pieter Seelaar	United Arab Emirates	Ahmed Raza	Dubai International Cricket Stadium, Dubai	Netherlands by 8 wickets
T20I 987	29 October	Namibia	Gerhard Erasmus	Oman	Zeeshan Maqsood	Dubai International Cricket Stadium, Dubai	Namibia by 54 runs
T20I 989	30 October	Scotland	Kyle Coetzer	United Arab Emirates	Ahmed Raza	Dubai International Cricket Stadium, Dubai	Scotland by 90 runs
T20I 990	30 October	Hong Kong	Aizaz Khan	Oman	Zeeshan Maqsood	Dubai International Cricket Stadium, Dubai	Oman by 12 runs
T20I 991	31 October	Scotland	Kyle Coetzer	Oman	Zeeshan Maqsood	ICC Academy Ground, Dubai	Scotland by 5 wickets
T20I 994	1 November	Ireland	Gary Wilson	Netherlands	Pieter Seelaar	Dubai International Cricket Stadium, Dubai	Netherlands by 21 runs
T20I 995	1 November	Papua New Guinea	Assad Vala	Namibia	Gerhard Erasmus	Dubai International Cricket Stadium, Dubai	Papua New Guinea by 18 runs
T20I 996	2 November	Ireland	Gary Wilson	Namibia	Gerhard Erasmus	Dubai International Cricket Stadium, Dubai	Ireland by 27 runs
Final
T20I 997	2 November	Netherlands	Pieter Seelaar	Papua New Guinea	Assad Vala	Dubai International Cricket Stadium, Dubai	Netherlands by 7 wickets

==== Final standings ====
Position	Team
1st	Netherlands
2nd	Papua New Guinea
3rd	Ireland
4th	Namibia
5th	Scotland
6th	Oman
7th	United Arab Emirates
8th	Hong Kong
9th	Canada
10th	Jersey
11th	Kenya
12th	Singapore
13th	Bermuda
14th	Nigeria

1st to 6th Qualified for the 2020 ICC Men's T20 World Cup and 2021 ICC Men's T20 World Cup Qualifier.

=== Bangladesh women in Pakistan ===
WT20I series
No.	Date	Home captain	Away captain	Venue	Result
WT20I 787	26 October	Bismah Maroof	Salma Khatun	Gaddafi Stadium, Lahore	Pakistan by 14 runs
WT20I 788	28 October	Bismah Maroof	Salma Khatun	Gaddafi Stadium, Lahore	Pakistan by 15 runs
WT20I 789	30 October	Bismah Maroof	Salma Khatun	Gaddafi Stadium, Lahore	Pakistan by 28 runs
WODI series
No.	Date	Home captain	Away captain	Venue	Result
WODI 1171	2 November	Bismah Maroof	Rumana Ahmed	Gaddafi Stadium, Lahore	Pakistan by 29 runs
WODI 1173	4 November	Bismah Maroof	Rumana Ahmed	Gaddafi Stadium, Lahore	Bangladesh by 1 wicket

=== Sri Lanka in Australia ===
T20I series
No.	Date	Home captain	Away captain	Venue	Result
T20I 978	27 October	Aaron Finch	Lasith Malinga	Adelaide Oval, Adelaide	Australia by 134 runs
T20I 988	30 October	Aaron Finch	Lasith Malinga	The Gabba, Brisbane	Australia by 9 wickets
T20I 993	1 November	Aaron Finch	Lasith Malinga	Melbourne Cricket Ground, Melbourne	Australia by 7 wickets

== November ==
=== England in New Zealand ===
T20I series
No.	Date	Home captain	Away captain	Venue	Result
T20I 992	1 November	Tim Southee	Eoin Morgan	Hagley Oval, Christchurch	England by 7 wickets
T20I 998	3 November	Tim Southee	Eoin Morgan	Wellington Regional Stadium, Wellington	New Zealand by 21 runs
T20I 1001	5 November	Tim Southee	Eoin Morgan	Saxton Oval, Nelson	New Zealand by 14 runs
T20I 1008	8 November	Tim Southee	Eoin Morgan	McLean Park, Napier	England by 76 runs
T20I 1012	10 November	Tim Southee	Eoin Morgan	Eden Park No. 1, Auckland	Match tied (England won S/O)
Test series
No.	Date	Home captain	Away captain	Venue	Result
Test 2367	21–25 November	Kane Williamson	Joe Root	Bay Oval, Mount Maunganui	New Zealand by an innings and 65 runs
Test 2371	29 November–3 December	Kane Williamson	Joe Root	Seddon Park, Hamilton	Match drawn

=== India women in West Indies ===
2017–20 ICC Women's Championship – WODI series
No.	Date	Home captain	Away captain	Venue	Result
WODI 1170	1 November	Stafanie Taylor	Mithali Raj	Sir Vivian Richards Stadium, Antigua	West Indies by 1 run
WODI 1172	3 November	Stafanie Taylor	Mithali Raj	Sir Vivian Richards Stadium, Antigua	India by 53 runs
WODI 1174	6 November	Stafanie Taylor	Mithali Raj	Sir Vivian Richards Stadium, Antigua	India by 6 wickets
WT20I series
No.	Date	Home captain	Away captain	Venue	Result
WT20I 796	9 November	Anisa Mohammed	Harmanpreet Kaur	Daren Sammy Cricket Ground, Gros Islet	India by 84 runs
WT20I 798	10 November	Anisa Mohammed	Harmanpreet Kaur	Daren Sammy Cricket Ground, Gros Islet	India by 10 wickets
WT20I 799	14 November	Anisa Mohammed	Harmanpreet Kaur	Providence Stadium, Providence	India by 7 wickets
WT20I 800	17 November	Anisa Mohammed	Harmanpreet Kaur	Providence Stadium, Providence	India by 5 runs
WT20I 801	20 November	Anisa Mohammed	Smriti Mandhana	Providence Stadium, Providence	India by 61 runs

=== Pakistan in Australia ===
T20I series
No.	Date	Home captain	Away captain	Venue	Result
T20I 999	3 November	Aaron Finch	Babar Azam	Sydney Cricket Ground, Sydney	No result
T20I 1002	5 November	Aaron Finch	Babar Azam	Manuka Oval, Canberra	Australia by 7 wickets
T20I 1009	8 November	Aaron Finch	Babar Azam	Perth Stadium, Perth	Australia by 10 wickets
2019–2021 ICC World Test Championship – Test series
No.	Date	Home captain	Away captain	Venue	Result
Test 2368	21–25 November	Tim Paine	Azhar Ali	The Gabba, Brisbane	Australia by an innings and 5 runs
Test 2372	29 November–3 December	Tim Paine	Azhar Ali	Adelaide Oval, Adelaide	Australia by an innings and 48 runs

=== Bangladesh in India ===
T20I series
No.	Date	Home captain	Away captain	Venue	Result
T20I 1000	3 November	Rohit Sharma	Mahmudullah	Arun Jaitley Cricket Stadium, Delhi	Bangladesh by 7 wickets
T20I 1007	7 November	Rohit Sharma	Mahmudullah	Saurashtra Cricket Association Stadium, Rajkot	India by 8 wickets
T20I 1014	10 November	Rohit Sharma	Mahmudullah	Vidarbha Cricket Association Stadium, Nagpur	India by 30 runs
2019–2021 ICC World Test Championship – Test series
No.	Date	Home captain	Away captain	Venue	Result
Test 2366	14–18 November	Virat Kohli	Mominul Haque	Holkar Stadium, Indore	India by an innings and 130 runs
Test 2369	22–26 November	Virat Kohli	Mominul Haque	Eden Gardens, Kolkata	India by an innings and 46 runs

=== West Indies vs Afghanistan in India ===
ODI series
No.	Date	Home captain	Away captain	Venue	Result
ODI 4213	6 November	Rashid Khan	Kieron Pollard	Ekana Cricket Stadium, Lucknow	West Indies by 7 wickets
ODI 4214	9 November	Rashid Khan	Kieron Pollard	Ekana Cricket Stadium, Lucknow	West Indies by 47 runs
ODI 4215	11 November	Rashid Khan	Kieron Pollard	Ekana Cricket Stadium, Lucknow	West Indies by 5 wickets
T20I series
No.	Date	Home captain	Away captain	Venue	Result
T20I 1015	14 November	Rashid Khan	Kieron Pollard	Ekana Cricket Stadium, Lucknow	West Indies by 30 runs
T20I 1016	16 November	Rashid Khan	Kieron Pollard	Ekana Cricket Stadium, Lucknow	Afghanistan by 41 runs
T20I 1017	17 November	Rashid Khan	Kieron Pollard	Ekana Cricket Stadium, Lucknow	Afghanistan by 29 runs
Only Test
No.	Date	Home captain	Away captain	Venue	Result
Test 2370	27 November–1 December	Rashid Khan	Jason Holder	Ekana Cricket Stadium, Lucknow	West Indies by 9 wickets

== December ==
=== 2019 Oman Cricket World Cup Challenge League B ===
2019–2022 ICC Cricket World Cup Challenge League – List A series
No.	Date	Team 1	Captain 1	Team 2	Captain 2	Venue	Result
1st List A	2 December	Uganda	Brian Masaba	Jersey	Charles Perchard	Al Amerat Cricket Stadium, Muscat	Uganda by 25 runs
2nd List A	3 December	Italy	Joy Perera	Kenya	Irfan Karim	Al Amerat Cricket Stadium, Muscat	Italy by 4 wickets
3rd List A	3 December	Hong Kong	Aizaz Khan	Bermuda	Terryn Fray	Al Amerat Cricket Stadium, Muscat	Hong Kong by 3 wickets
4th List A	5 December	Jersey	Charles Perchard	Hong Kong	Aizaz Khan	Al Amerat Cricket Stadium, Muscat	Hong Kong by 4 wickets
5th List A	5 December	Kenya	Irfan Karim	Uganda	Brian Masaba	Al Amerat Cricket Stadium, Muscat	Uganda by 3 wickets
6th List A	6 December	Bermuda	Terryn Fray	Uganda	Brian Masaba	Al Amerat Cricket Stadium, Muscat	Uganda by 7 wickets
7th List A	6 December	Jersey	Charles Perchard	Italy	Joy Perera	Al Amerat Cricket Stadium, Muscat	Jersey by 122 runs
8th List A	8 December	Italy	Joy Perera	Hong Kong	Aizaz Khan	Al Amerat Cricket Stadium, Muscat	No result
9th List A	8 December	Kenya	Irfan Karim	Bermuda	Terryn Fray	Al Amerat Cricket Stadium, Muscat	No result
10th List A	9 December	Jersey	Charles Perchard	Kenya	Irfan Karim	Al Amerat Cricket Stadium, Muscat	Kenya by 7 wickets
11th List A	9 December	Uganda	Arnold Otwani	Italy	Joy Perera	Al Amerat Cricket Stadium, Muscat	Uganda by 38 runs
12th List A	11 December	Hong Kong	Aizaz Khan	Uganda	Arnold Otwani	Al Amerat Cricket Stadium, Muscat	Uganda by 6 wickets
13th List A	11 December	Bermuda	Terryn Fray	Jersey	Charles Perchard	Al Amerat Cricket Stadium, Muscat	Jersey by 6 wickets
14th List A	12 December	Italy	Joy Perera	Bermuda	Delray Rawlins	Al Amerat Cricket Stadium, Muscat	Italy by 5 wickets
15th List A	12 December	Kenya	Irfan Karim	Hong Kong	Aizaz Khan	Al Amerat Cricket Stadium, Muscat	Hong Kong by 3 wickets

=== West Indies in India ===
T20I series
No.	Date	Home captain	Away captain	Venue	Result
T20I 1020	6 December	Virat Kohli	Kieron Pollard	Rajiv Gandhi International Cricket Stadium, Hyderabad	India by 6 wickets
T20I 1022	8 December	Virat Kohli	Kieron Pollard	Greenfield International Stadium, Thiruvananthapuram	West Indies by 8 wickets
T20I 1024	11 December	Virat Kohli	Kieron Pollard	Wankhede Stadium, Mumbai	India by 67 runs
ODI series
No.	Date	Home captain	Away captain	Venue	Result
ODI 4221	15 December	Virat Kohli	Kieron Pollard	M. A. Chidambaram Stadium, Chennai	West Indies by 8 wickets
ODI 4222	18 December	Virat Kohli	Kieron Pollard	ACA–VDCA Cricket Stadium, Visakhapatnam	India by 107 runs
ODI 4223	22 December	Virat Kohli	Kieron Pollard	Barabati Stadium, Cuttack	India by 4 wickets

=== 2019 United Arab Emirates Tri-Nation Series ===
2019–2023 ICC Cricket World Cup League 2 – Tri-series
No.	Date	Team 1	Captain 1	Team 2	Captain 2	Venue	Result
ODI 4216	8 December	United Arab Emirates	Ahmed Raza	United States	Saurabh Netravalkar	Sharjah Cricket Stadium, Sharjah	United States by 3 wickets
ODI 4217	9 December	United States	Saurabh Netravalkar	Scotland	Kyle Coetzer	Sharjah Cricket Stadium, Sharjah	United States by 35 runs
ODI 4217a	11 December	United Arab Emirates	Ahmed Raza	Scotland	Kyle Coetzer	Sharjah Cricket Stadium, Sharjah	Match abandoned
ODI 4218	12 December	United Arab Emirates	Ahmed Raza	United States	Saurabh Netravalkar	ICC Academy Ground, Dubai	United States by 98 runs
ODI 4219	14 December	United States	Saurabh Netravalkar	Scotland	Kyle Coetzer	ICC Academy Ground, Dubai	Scotland by 4 wickets
ODI 4220	15 December	United Arab Emirates	Ahmed Raza	Scotland	Kyle Coetzer	ICC Academy Ground, Dubai	United Arab Emirates by 7 wickets

=== England women against Pakistan women in Malaysia ===
2017–20 ICC Women's Championship – WODI series
No.	Date	Home captain	Away captain	Venue	Result
WODI 1175	9 December	Bismah Maroof	Heather Knight	Kinrara Oval, Kuala Lumpur	England by 75 runs
WODI 1176	12 December	Bismah Maroof	Heather Knight	Kinrara Oval, Kuala Lumpur	England by 127 runs
WODI 1177	14 December	Bismah Maroof	Heather Knight	Kinrara Oval, Kuala Lumpur	No result
WT20I series
No.	Date	Home captain	Away captain	Venue	Result
WT20I 817	17 December	Bismah Maroof	Heather Knight	Kinrara Oval, Kuala Lumpur	England by 29 runs
WT20I 818	19 December	Bismah Maroof	Heather Knight	Kinrara Oval, Kuala Lumpur	England by 84 runs
WT20I 819	20 December	Bismah Maroof	Heather Knight	Kinrara Oval, Kuala Lumpur	England by 26 runs

=== New Zealand in Australia ===
The last two ODI matches were cancelled in March 2020 due to the COVID-19 pandemic.

2019–2021 ICC World Test Championship, Trans-Tasman Trophy – Test series
No.	Date	Home captain	Away captain	Venue	Result
Test 2374	12–16 December	Tim Paine	Kane Williamson	Perth Stadium, Perth	Australia by 296 runs
Test 2376	26–30 December	Tim Paine	Kane Williamson	Melbourne Cricket Ground, Melbourne	Australia by 247 runs
Test 2378	3–7 January	Tim Paine	Tom Latham	Sydney Cricket Ground, Sydney	Australia by 279 runs
Chappell–Hadlee Trophy – ODI series
No.	Date	Home captain	Away captain	Venue	Result
ODI 4255	13 March	Aaron Finch	Kane Williamson	Sydney Cricket Ground, Sydney	Australia by 71 runs
ODI 4255a	15 March	Aaron Finch	Kane Williamson	Sydney Cricket Ground, Sydney	
ODI 4255d	20 March	Aaron Finch	Kane Williamson	Bellerive Oval, Hobart	

=== England in South Africa ===
2019–2021 ICC World Test Championship – Test series
No.	Date	Home captain	Away captain	Venue	Result
Test 2377	26–30 December	Faf du Plessis	Joe Root	Centurion Park, Centurion	South Africa by 107 runs
Test 2379	3–7 January	Faf du Plessis	Joe Root	Newlands Cricket Ground, Cape Town	England by 189 runs
Test 2380	16–20 January	Faf du Plessis	Joe Root	St. George's Park, Port Elizabeth	England by an innings and 53 runs
Test 2382	24–28 January	Faf du Plessis	Joe Root	Wanderers Stadium, Johannesburg	England by 191 runs
ODI series
No.	Date	Home captain	Away captain	Venue	Result
ODI 4234	4 February	Quinton de Kock	Eoin Morgan	Newlands Cricket Ground, Cape Town	South Africa by 7 wickets
ODI 4238	7 February	Quinton de Kock	Eoin Morgan	Kingsmead Cricket Ground, Durban	No result
ODI 4242	9 February	Quinton de Kock	Eoin Morgan	Wanderers Stadium, Johannesburg	England by 2 wickets
T20I series
No.	Date	Home captain	Away captain	Venue	Result
T20I 1039	12 February	Quinton de Kock	Eoin Morgan	Buffalo Park, East London	South Africa by 1 run
T20I 1041	14 February	Quinton de Kock	Eoin Morgan	Kingsmead Cricket Ground, Durban	England by 2 runs
T20I 1043	16 February	Quinton de Kock	Eoin Morgan	Centurion Park, Centurion	England by 5 wickets

== January ==
=== 2020 Oman Tri-Nation Series ===
2019–2023 ICC Cricket World Cup League 2 – Tri-series
No.	Date	Team 1	Captain 1	Team 2	Captain 2	Venue	Result
ODI 4224	5 January	Oman	Zeeshan Maqsood	United Arab Emirates	Ahmed Raza	Al Amerat Cricket Stadium, Muscat	Oman by 5 wickets
ODI 4225	6 January	Namibia	Gerhard Erasmus	United Arab Emirates	Ahmed Raza	Al Amerat Cricket Stadium, Muscat	United Arab Emirates by 8 runs
ODI 4227	8 January	Oman	Zeeshan Maqsood	Namibia	Gerhard Erasmus	Al Amerat Cricket Stadium, Muscat	Namibia by 52 runs
ODI 4228	9 January	Namibia	Gerhard Erasmus	United Arab Emirates	Ahmed Raza	Al Amerat Cricket Stadium, Muscat	United Arab Emirates by 8 wickets
ODI 4229a	11 January	Oman	Zeeshan Maqsood	United Arab Emirates	Ahmed Raza	Al Amerat Cricket Stadium, Muscat	Match abandoned
ODI 4229b	12 January	Oman	Zeeshan Maqsood	Namibia	Gerhard Erasmus	Al Amerat Cricket Stadium, Muscat	Match abandoned

=== Sri Lanka in India ===
T20I series
No.	Date	Home captain	Away captain	Venue	Result
T20I 1025	5 January	Virat Kohli	Lasith Malinga	Barsapara Stadium, Guwahati	No result
T20I 1026	7 January	Virat Kohli	Lasith Malinga	Holkar Stadium, Indore	India by 7 wickets
T20I 1027	10 January	Virat Kohli	Lasith Malinga	Maharashtra Cricket Association Stadium, Pune	India by 78 runs

=== Ireland in West Indies ===
ODI series
No.	Date	Home captain	Away captain	Venue	Result
ODI 4226	7 January	Kieron Pollard	Andrew Balbirnie	Kensington Oval, Bridgetown	West Indies by 5 wickets
ODI 4229	9 January	Kieron Pollard	Andrew Balbirnie	Kensington Oval, Bridgetown	West Indies by 1 wicket
ODI 4230	12 January	Kieron Pollard	Andrew Balbirnie	National Cricket Stadium, St. George's	West Indies by 5 wickets (DLS)
T20I series
No.	Date	Home captain	Away captain	Venue	Result
T20I 1028	15 January	Kieron Pollard	Andrew Balbirnie	National Cricket Stadium, St. George's	Ireland by 4 runs
T20I 1029	18 January	Kieron Pollard	Andrew Balbirnie	Warner Park, Basseterre	No result
T20I 1030	19 January	Kieron Pollard	Andrew Balbirnie	Warner Park, Basseterre	West Indies by 9 wickets

=== Australia in India ===
ODI series
No.	Date	Home captain	Away captain	Venue	Result
ODI 4231	14 January	Virat Kohli	Aaron Finch	Wankhede Stadium, Mumbai	Australia by 10 wickets
ODI 4232	17 January	Virat Kohli	Aaron Finch	Saurashtra Cricket Association Stadium, Rajkot	India by 36 runs
ODI 4233	19 January	Virat Kohli	Aaron Finch	M. Chinnaswamy Stadium, Bengaluru	India by 7 wickets

=== Sri Lanka in Zimbabwe ===
Test series
No.	Date	Home captain	Away captain	Venue	Result
Test 2381	19–23 January	Sean Williams	Dimuth Karunaratne	Harare Sports Club, Harare	Sri Lanka by 10 wickets
Test 2383	27–31 January	Sean Williams	Dimuth Karunaratne	Harare Sports Club, Harare	Match drawn

=== India in New Zealand ===
T20I series
No.	Date	Home captain	Away captain	Venue	Result
T20I 1031	24 January	Kane Williamson	Virat Kohli	Eden Park No. 1, Auckland	India by 6 wickets
T20I 1034	26 January	Kane Williamson	Virat Kohli	Eden Park No. 1, Auckland	India by 7 wickets
T20I 1035	29 January	Kane Williamson	Virat Kohli	Seddon Park, Hamilton	Match tied (India won S/O)
T20I 1036	31 January	Tim Southee	Virat Kohli	Wellington Regional Stadium, Wellington	Match tied (India won S/O)
T20I 1037	2 February	Tim Southee	Rohit Sharma	Bay Oval, Mount Maunganui	India by 7 runs
ODI series
No.	Date	Home captain	Away captain	Venue	Result
ODI 4235	5 February	Tom Latham	Virat Kohli	Seddon Park, Hamilton	New Zealand by 4 wickets
ODI 4239	8 February	Tom Latham	Virat Kohli	Eden Park No. 1, Auckland	New Zealand by 22 runs
ODI 4243	11 February	Kane Williamson	Virat Kohli	Bay Oval, Mount Maunganui	New Zealand by 5 wickets
2019–2021 ICC World Test Championship – Test series
No.	Date	Home captain	Away captain	Venue	Result
Test 2385	21–25 February	Kane Williamson	Virat Kohli	Basin Reserve, Wellington	New Zealand by 10 wickets
Test 2387	29 February–4 March	Kane Williamson	Virat Kohli	Hagley Oval, Christchurch	New Zealand by 7 wickets

=== Bangladesh in Pakistan ===
The one-off ODI and the second Test were cancelled in March 2020 due to the COVID-19 pandemic.

T20I series
No.	Date	Home captain	Away captain	Venue	Result
T20I 1032	24 January	Babar Azam	Mahmudullah	Gaddafi Stadium, Lahore	Pakistan by 5 wickets
T20I 1033	25 January	Babar Azam	Mahmudullah	Gaddafi Stadium, Lahore	Pakistan by 9 wickets
T20I 1034a	27 January	Babar Azam	Mahmudullah	Gaddafi Stadium, Lahore	Match abandoned
2019–2021 ICC World Test Championship – Test series
No.	Date	Home captain	Away captain	Venue	Result
Test 2384	7–11 February	Azhar Ali	Mominul Haque	Rawalpindi Cricket Stadium, Rawalpindi	Pakistan by an innings and 44 runs
2nd Test	5–9 April			National Stadium, Karachi	
Only ODI
No.	Date	Home captain	Away captain	Venue	Result
Only ODI	1 April		Tamim Iqbal	National Stadium, Karachi	

=== South Africa women in New Zealand ===
2017–20 ICC Women's Championship – WODI series
No.	Date	Home captain	Away captain	Venue	Result
WODI 1178	25 January	Sophie Devine	Dane van Niekerk	Eden Park Outer Oval, Auckland	South Africa by 7 wickets
WODI 1179	27 January	Sophie Devine	Dane van Niekerk	Eden Park Outer Oval, Auckland	South Africa by 8 wickets
WODI 1180	30 January	Sophie Devine	Dane van Niekerk	Seddon Park, Hamilton	South Africa by 6 wickets
WT20I series
No.	Date	Home captain	Away captain	Venue	Result
WT20I 834	2 February	Sophie Devine	Chloe Tryon	Bay Oval, Mount Maunganui	New Zealand by 9 wickets
WT20I 837	6 February	Sophie Devine	Dane van Niekerk	Seddon Park, Hamilton	New Zealand by 5 wickets
WT20I 843	9 February	Sophie Devine	Dane van Niekerk	Basin Reserve, Wellington	South Africa by 5 wickets
WT20I 844	10 February	Sophie Devine	Dane van Niekerk	Basin Reserve, Wellington	New Zealand by 69 runs
WT20I 845a	13 February	Sophie Devine	Dane van Niekerk	University of Otago Oval, Dunedin	Match abandoned

=== 2020 Australia women's Tri-Nation Series ===
Pos	Team	Pld	W	L	NR	Pts	NRR
1	Australia (H)	4	2	2	0	4	0.238
2	India	4	2	2	0	4	−0.071
3	England	4	2	2	0	4	−0.169

Source: ESPNcricinfo
(H) Host

WT20I Tri-series
No.	Date	Team 1	Captain 1	Team 2	Captain 2	Venue	Result
WT20I 831	31 January	India	Harmanpreet Kaur	England	Heather Knight	Manuka Oval, Canberra	India by 5 wickets
WT20I 832	1 February	Australia	Meg Lanning	England	Heather Knight	Manuka Oval, Canberra	Match tied (England won S/O)
WT20I 833	2 February	Australia	Rachael Haynes	India	Harmanpreet Kaur	Manuka Oval, Canberra	Australia by 4 wickets
WT20I 838	7 February	India	Harmanpreet Kaur	England	Heather Knight	Junction Oval, Melbourne	England by 4 wickets
WT20I 840	8 February	Australia	Meg Lanning	India	Harmanpreet Kaur	Junction Oval, Melbourne	India by 7 wickets
WT20I 842	9 February	Australia	Meg Lanning	England	Heather Knight	Junction Oval, Melbourne	Australia by 16 runs
Final
WT20I 845	12 February	Australia	Meg Lanning	India	Harmanpreet Kaur	Junction Oval, Melbourne	Australia by 11 runs

== February ==
=== 2020 Nepal Tri-Nation Series ===
2019–2023 ICC Cricket World Cup League 2 – Tri-series
No.	Date	Team 1	Captain 1	Team 2	Captain 2	Venue	Result
ODI 4236	5 February	Nepal	Gyanendra Malla	Oman	Zeeshan Maqsood	Tribhuvan University International Cricket Ground, Kirtipur	Oman by 18 runs
ODI 4237	6 February	Oman	Zeeshan Maqsood	United States	Saurabh Netravalkar	Tribhuvan University International Cricket Ground, Kirtipur	Oman by 6 wickets
ODI 4240	8 February	Nepal	Gyanendra Malla	United States	Saurabh Netravalkar	Tribhuvan University International Cricket Ground, Kirtipur	Nepal 35 by runs
ODI 4241	9 February	Nepal	Gyanendra Malla	Oman	Zeeshan Maqsood	Tribhuvan University International Cricket Ground, Kirtipur	Oman by 8 wickets
ODI 4244	11 February	Oman	Zeeshan Maqsood	United States	Saurabh Netravalkar	Tribhuvan University International Cricket Ground, Kirtipur	Oman by 92 runs
ODI 4245	12 February	Nepal	Gyanendra Malla	United States	Saurabh Netravalkar	Tribhuvan University International Cricket Ground, Kirtipur	Nepal by 8 wickets

=== 2020 ICC Women's T20 World Cup ===
Pos	Team	Pld	W	L	T	NR	Pts	NRR
1	India	4	4	0	0	0	8	0.979
2	Australia	4	3	1	0	0	6	0.971
3	New Zealand	4	2	2	0	0	4	0.364
4	Sri Lanka	4	1	3	0	0	2	−0.404
5	Bangladesh	4	0	4	0	0	0	−1.908

Source: ESPNCricinfo

Advance to Knockout stage

Pos	Team	Pld	W	L	T	NR	Pts	NRR
1	South Africa	4	3	0	0	1	7	2.226
2	England	4	3	1	0	0	6	2.291
3	West Indies	4	1	2	0	1	3	−0.654
4	Pakistan	4	1	2	0	1	3	−0.761
5	Thailand	4	0	3	0	1	1	−3.992

Source: ESPNCricinfo

Advance to Knockout stage

Group stage
No.	Date	Team 1	Captain 1	Team 2	Captain 2	Venue	Result
WT20I 846	21 February	Australia	Meg Lanning	India	Harmanpreet Kaur	Sydney Showground Stadium, Sydney	India by 17 runs
WT20I 847	22 February	West Indies	Stafanie Taylor	Thailand	Sornnarin Tippoch	WACA Ground, Perth	West Indies by 7 wickets
WT20I 848	22 February	New Zealand	Sophie Devine	Sri Lanka	Chamari Athapaththu	WACA Ground, Perth	New Zealand by 7 wickets
WT20I 849	23 February	England	Heather Knight	South Africa	Dane van Niekerk	WACA Ground, Perth	South Africa won by 6 wickets
WT20I 850	24 February	Australia	Meg Lanning	Sri Lanka	Chamari Athapaththu	WACA Ground, Perth	Australia by 5 wickets
WT20I 851	24 February	India	Harmanpreet Kaur	Bangladesh	Salma Khatun	WACA Ground, Perth	India by 18 runs
WT20I 852	26 February	England	Heather Knight	Thailand	Sornnarin Tippoch	Manuka Oval, Canberra	England by 98 runs
WT20I 853	26 February	West Indies	Stafanie Taylor	Pakistan	Bismah Maroof	Manuka Oval, Canberra	Pakistan by 8 wickets
WT20I 854	27 February	India	Harmanpreet Kaur	New Zealand	Sophie Devine	Junction Oval, Melbourne	India by 3 runs
WT20I 855	27 February	Australia	Meg Lanning	Bangladesh	Salma Khatun	Manuka Oval, Canberra	Australia by 86 runs
WT20I 856	28 February	South Africa	Dane van Niekerk	Thailand	Sornnarin Tippoch	Manuka Oval, Canberra	South Africa won by 113 runs
WT20I 857	28 February	England	Heather Knight	Pakistan	Bismah Maroof	Manuka Oval, Canberra	England by 42 runs
WT20I 858	29 February	New Zealand	Sophie Devine	Bangladesh	Salma Khatun	Junction Oval, Melbourne	New Zealand by 17 runs
WT20I 859	29 February	India	Harmanpreet Kaur	Sri Lanka	Chamari Athapaththu	Junction Oval, Melbourne	India by 7 wickets
WT20I 860	1 March	South Africa	Dane van Niekerk	Pakistan	Javeria Khan	Sydney Showground Stadium, Sydney	South Africa by 17 runs
WT20I 861	1 March	England	Heather Knight	West Indies	Stafanie Taylor	Sydney Showground Stadium, Sydney	England by 46 runs
WT20I 862	2 March	Sri Lanka	Chamari Athapaththu	Bangladesh	Salma Khatun	Junction Oval, Melbourne	Sri Lanka by 9 wickets
WT20I 863	2 March	Australia	Meg Lanning	New Zealand	Sophie Devine	Junction Oval, Melbourne	Australia by 4 runs
WT20I 864	3 March	Pakistan	Javeria Khan	Thailand	Sornnarin Tippoch	Sydney Showground Stadium, Sydney	No result
WT20I 864a	3 March	West Indies	Anisa Mohammed	South Africa	Dane van Niekerk	Sydney Showground Stadium, Sydney	Match abandoned
Semi-finals
WT20I 864b	5 March	India	Harmanpreet Kaur	England	Heather Knight	Sydney Cricket Ground, Sydney	Match abandoned
WT20I 865	5 March	Australia	Meg Lanning	South Africa	Dane van Niekerk	Sydney Cricket Ground, Sydney	Australia won by 5 runs (DLS)
Final
WT20I 866	8 March	Australia	Meg Lanning	India	Harmanpreet Kaur	Melbourne Cricket Ground, Melbourne	Australia won by 85 runs

=== Australia in South Africa ===
T20I series
No.	Date	Home captain	Away captain	Venue	Result
T20I 1046	21 February	Quinton de Kock	Aaron Finch	Wanderers Stadium, Johannesburg	Australia by 107 runs
T20I 1052	23 February	Quinton de Kock	Aaron Finch	St. George's Park, Port Elizabeth	South Africa by 12 runs
T20I 1065	26 February	Quinton de Kock	Aaron Finch	Newlands Cricket Ground, Cape Town	Australia by 97 runs
ODI series
No.	Date	Home captain	Away captain	Venue	Result
ODI 4248	29 February	Quinton de Kock	Aaron Finch	Boland Park, Paarl	South Africa by 74 runs
ODI 4252	4 March	Quinton de Kock	Aaron Finch	Mangaung Oval, Bloemfontein	South Africa by 6 wickets
ODI 4254	7 March	Quinton de Kock	Aaron Finch	Senwes Park, Potchefstroom	South Africa by 6 wickets

=== Zimbabwe in Bangladesh ===
Only Test
No.	Date	Home captain	Away captain	Venue	Result
Test 2386	22–26 February	Mominul Haque	Craig Ervine	Sher-e-Bangla National Cricket Stadium, Dhaka	Bangladesh by an innings and 106 runs
ODI series
No.	Date	Home captain	Away captain	Venue	Result
ODI 4249	1 March	Mashrafe Mortaza	Chamu Chibhabha	Sylhet International Cricket Stadium, Sylhet	Bangladesh by 169 runs
ODI 4251	3 March	Mashrafe Mortaza	Sean Williams	Sylhet International Cricket Stadium, Sylhet	Bangladesh by 4 runs
ODI 4253	6 March	Mashrafe Mortaza	Sean Williams	Sylhet International Cricket Stadium, Sylhet	Bangladesh by 123 runs (DLS)
T20I series
No.	Date	Home captain	Away captain	Venue	Result
T20I 1082	9 March	Mahmudullah	Sean Williams	Sher-e-Bangla National Cricket Stadium, Dhaka	Bangladesh by 48 runs
T20I 1084	11 March	Mahmudullah	Sean Williams	Sher-e-Bangla National Cricket Stadium, Dhaka	Bangladesh by 9 wickets

=== West Indies in Sri Lanka ===
ODI series
No.	Date	Home captain	Away captain	Venue	Result
ODI 4246	22 February	Dimuth Karunaratne	Kieron Pollard	Sinhalese Sports Club Cricket Ground, Colombo	Sri Lanka by 1 wicket
ODI 4247	26 February	Dimuth Karunaratne	Kieron Pollard	Mahinda Rajapaksa International Cricket Stadium, Hambantota	Sri Lanka by 161 runs
ODI 4250	1 March	Dimuth Karunaratne	Kieron Pollard	Pallekele International Cricket Stadium, Kandy	Sri Lanka by 6 runs
T20I series
No.	Date	Home captain	Away captain	Venue	Result
T20I 1075	4 March	Lasith Malinga	Kieron Pollard	Pallekele International Cricket Stadium, Kandy	West Indies by 25 runs
T20I 1078	6 March	Lasith Malinga	Kieron Pollard	Pallekele International Cricket Stadium, Kandy	West Indies by 7 wickets

== March ==
=== Ireland vs Afghanistan in India ===
T20I series
No.	Date	Home captain	Away captain	Venue	Result
T20I 1077	6 March	Asghar Afghan	Andrew Balbirnie	Shaheed Vijay Singh Pathik Sports Complex, Greater Noida	Afghanistan by 11 runs (DLS)
T20I 1079	8 March	Asghar Afghan	Andrew Balbirnie	Shaheed Vijay Singh Pathik Sports Complex, Greater Noida	Afghanistan by 21 runs
T20I 1083	10 March	Asghar Afghan	Andrew Balbirnie	Shaheed Vijay Singh Pathik Sports Complex, Greater Noida	Match tied (Ireland won S/O)

=== England in Sri Lanka ===
The two Test matches were postponed in March 2020 due to the COVID-19 pandemic, with the series rescheduled for January 2021.

2019–2021 ICC World Test Championship - Test series
No.	Date	Home captain	Away captain	Venue	Result
Test 2387a	19–23 March	Dimuth Karunaratne	Joe Root	Galle International Stadium, Galle	
Test 2387b	27–31 March	Dimuth Karunaratne	Joe Root	Sinhalese Sports Club Cricket Ground, Colombo	

=== Mujib 100 T20 Cup Bangladesh 2020 ===
The two T20I matches were postponed in March 2020 due to the COVID-19 pandemic.

T20I series
No.	Date	Home captain	Away captain	Venue	Result
T20I 1084a	21 March			Sher-e-Bangla National Cricket Stadium, Dhaka	
T20I 1084b	22 March			Sher-e-Bangla National Cricket Stadium, Dhaka	

=== Australia women in South Africa ===
In early March 2020, the tour was postponed due to the COVID-19 pandemic.

2017–20 ICC Women's Championship – WODI series
No.	Date	Home captain	Away captain	Venue	Result
WODI 1180a	22 March	Dane van Niekerk		Kingsmead Cricket Ground, Durban	
WODI 1180b	25 March	Dane van Niekerk		City Oval, Pietermaritzburg	
WODI 1180c	28 March	Dane van Niekerk		Buffalo Park, East London	
WT20I series
No.	Date	Home captain	Away captain	Venue	Result
WT20I 866a	31 March			Buffalo Park, East London	
WT20I 866b	3 April			Willowmoore Park, Benoni	
WT20I 866c	4 April			Willowmoore Park, Benoni	

=== Australia in New Zealand ===
The series was cancelled in March 2020 due to the COVID-19 pandemic.

T20I series
No.	Date	Home captain	Away captain	Venue	Result
1st T20I	24 March			University of Otago Oval, Dunedin	
2nd T20I	27 March			Eden Park No. 1, Auckland	
3rd T20I	29 March			Hagley Oval, Christchurch	

=== Netherlands in Namibia ===
The tour was cancelled in March 2020 due to the COVID-19 pandemic.

T20I series
No.	Date	Home captain	Away captain	Venue	Result
1st T20I	25 March		Pieter Seelaar	Wanderers Cricket Ground, Windhoek	
2nd T20I	26 March		Pieter Seelaar	Wanderers Cricket Ground, Windhoek	
3rd T20I	28 March		Pieter Seelaar	Wanderers Cricket Ground, Windhoek	
4th T20I	1 April		Pieter Seelaar	Wanderers Cricket Ground, Windhoek	
ODI series
No.	Date	Home captain	Away captain	Venue	Result
1st ODI	29 March		Pieter Seelaar	Wanderers Cricket Ground, Windhoek	
2nd ODI	31 March		Pieter Seelaar	Wanderers Cricket Ground, Windhoek	

== April ==
=== 2020 United States Tri-Nation Series ===
The ODI series was postponed in March 2020 due to the COVID-19 pandemic.

2019–2023 ICC Cricket World Cup League 2 – Tri-series
No.	Date	Team 1	Captain 1	Team 2	Captain 2	Venue	Result
1st ODI	1 April	United States		United Arab Emirates		Central Broward Regional Park, Lauderhill	
2nd ODI	2 April	Scotland		United Arab Emirates		Central Broward Regional Park, Lauderhill	
3rd ODI	4 April	United States		Scotland		Central Broward Regional Park, Lauderhill	
4th ODI	5 April	United States		United Arab Emirates		Central Broward Regional Park, Lauderhill	
5th ODI	7 April	Scotland		United Arab Emirates		Central Broward Regional Park, Lauderhill	
6th ODI	8 April	United States		Scotland		Central Broward Regional Park, Lauderhill	

=== Ireland in Zimbabwe ===
The tour was cancelled in March 2020 due to the COVID-19 pandemic.

T20I series
No.	Date	Home captain	Away captain	Venue	Result
1st T20I	2 April			Queens Sports Club, Bulawayo	
2nd T20I	4 April			Queens Sports Club, Bulawayo	
3rd T20I	5 April			Queens Sports Club, Bulawayo	
ODI series
No.	Date	Home captain	Away captain	Venue	Result
1st ODI	8 April			Queens Sports Club, Bulawayo	
2nd ODI	10 April			Queens Sports Club, Bulawayo	
3rd ODI	12 April			Queens Sports Club, Bulawayo	

=== 2020 Thailand Women's Quadrangular Series ===
A women's quadrangular series between Ireland, the Netherlands, Zimbabwe and the hosts Thailand was cancelled in early March 2020 due to the COVID-19 pandemic.

=== 2020 Namibia Tri-Nation Series ===
The ODI series was postponed in March 2020 due to the COVID-19 pandemic.

2019–2023 ICC Cricket World Cup League 2 – Tri-series
No.	Date	Team 1	Captain 1	Team 2	Captain 2	Venue	Result
[ 1st ODI]	20 April					Wanderers Cricket Ground, Windhoek	
[ 2nd ODI]	21 April					Wanderers Cricket Ground, Windhoek	
[ 3rd ODI]	23 April					Wanderers Cricket Ground, Windhoek	
[ 4th ODI]	24 April					Wanderers Cricket Ground, Windhoek	
[ 5th ODI]	26 April					Wanderers Cricket Ground, Windhoek	
[ 6th ODI]	27 April					Wanderers Cricket Ground, Windhoek	

== See also ==
- Associate international cricket in 2019–20
- Impact of the COVID-19 pandemic on cricket
