= Antwerp Indians Cricket Club Ground =

- AICC
- Location: Antwerp
- Country: Belgium
- As of 17 April 2021; Source: Cricinfo

The Antwerp Indians Cricket Club Ground is a cricket ground in Antwerp, Belgium, home to the Antwerp Indians Cricket Club. In February 2021, it was announced that the venue would host three Twenty20 International (T20I) matches in April 2021, between Belgium and Romania. However, the series was postponed in April 2021 due to the COVID-19 pandemic.
