= Associate international cricket in 2020–21 =

International cricket season

The 2020–21 Associate international cricket season was from September 2020 to April 2021. All official twenty over matches between Associate members of the ICC were eligible to have full Twenty20 International (T20I) or Women's Twenty20 International (WT20I) status, as the International Cricket Council (ICC) granted T20I status to matches between all of its members from 1 July 2018 (women's teams) and 1 January 2019 (men's teams). The season included all T20I/WT20I cricket series mostly involving ICC Associate members, that were played in addition to series covered in International cricket in 2020–21.

== Season overview ==
International tours
Start date	Home team	Away team	Results [Matches]
Start date	Home team	Away team	T20I
23 September 2020	Bulgaria	Malta	0–2 [4]
16 October 2020	Romania	Bulgaria	3–1 [4]
9 February 2021 (Note: The series was postponed due to the COVID-19 pandemic.)	Qatar	Nepal	[3]
3 April 2021	Namibia	Uganda	3–0 [3]
17 April 2021 (Note: The series was postponed due to the COVID-19 pandemic, and later rearranged to be played as a five-match series in Malta in 2021.)	Belgium	Malta	[4]
24 April 2021 (Note: The series was postponed due to the COVID-19 pandemic.)	Belgium	Romania	[3]
International tournaments
Start date	Tournament		Winners
24 September 2020 (Note: The tournament was cancelled due to the COVID-19 pandemic.)	(Czech Republic) 2020 Central Europe Cup		Cancelled
3 December 2020 (Note: The tournament was cancelled due to the COVID-19 pandemic.)	(Brazil) 2020 South American Championship		Cancelled
17 April 2021	2020–21 Nepal Tri-Nation Series		Nepal

Women's international tours
Start date	Home team	Away team	Results [Matches]	
Start date	Home team	Away team	WT20I	
24 January 2021 (Note: The tour was postponed due to the COVID-19 pandemic.)	Namibia	Zimbabwe	[5]	
Women's international tournaments
Start date	Tournament			Winners
3 December 2020 (Note: The tournament was cancelled due to the COVID-19 pandemic.)	(Brazil) 2020 South American Championship			Cancelled

== September ==
=== 2020 Central Europe Cup ===
The 2020 Central Europe Cup was cancelled due to the COVID-19 pandemic.

=== Malta in Bulgaria ===
T20I series
No.	Date	Home captain	Away captain	Venue	Result
T20I 1098	23 September	Prakash Mishra	Samuel Aquilina	National Sports Academy, Sofia	Malta by 57 runs
T20I 1099	23 September	Prakash Mishra	Samuel Aquilina	National Sports Academy, Sofia	Malta by 8 wickets
T20I 1100	24 September	Prakash Mishra	Samuel Aquilina	National Sports Academy, Sofia	No result
T20I 1100a	24 September	Prakash Mishra	Samuel Aquilina	National Sports Academy, Sofia	Match abandoned

== October ==
=== Bulgaria in Romania ===
Balkan Cup – T20I series
No.	Date	Home captain	Away captain	Venue	Result
T20I 1101	16 October	Ramesh Satheesan	Prakash Mishra	Moara Vlasiei Cricket Ground, Ilfov County	Bulgaria by 33 runs
T20I 1102	17 October	Ramesh Satheesan	Prakash Mishra	Moara Vlasiei Cricket Ground, Ilfov County	Romania by 52 runs
T20I 1103	17 October	Ramesh Satheesan	Prakash Mishra	Moara Vlasiei Cricket Ground, Ilfov County	Romania by 34 runs
T20I 1104	18 October	Ramesh Satheesan	Prakash Mishra	Moara Vlasiei Cricket Ground, Ilfov County	Romania by 6 wickets

== December ==
=== 2020 South American Cricket Championship ===
The 2020 South American Championships were cancelled due to the COVID-19 pandemic.

== January ==
=== Zimbabwe women in Namibia ===
The series was postponed in January 2021 due to the COVID-19 pandemic.

WT20I series
No.	Date	Home captain	Away captain	Venue	Result
1st WT20I	24 January	Irene van Zyl		United Ground, Windhoek	
2nd WT20I	25 January	Irene van Zyl		United Ground, Windhoek	
3rd WT20I	27 January	Irene van Zyl		United Ground, Windhoek	
4th WT20I	28 January	Irene van Zyl		United Ground, Windhoek	
5th WT20I	30 January	Irene van Zyl		United Ground, Windhoek	

== February ==
=== Nepal in Qatar ===
The series was postponed in February 2021 due to the COVID-19 pandemic.

T20I series
No.	Date	Home captain	Away captain	Venue	Result
[1st T20I]	9 February			West End Park International Cricket Stadium, Doha	
[2nd T20I]	10 February			West End Park International Cricket Stadium, Doha	
[3rd T20I]	12 February			West End Park International Cricket Stadium, Doha	

== April ==
=== Uganda in Namibia ===
T20I series
No.	Date	Home captain	Away captain	Venue	Result
T20I 1142	3 April	Gerhard Erasmus	Arnold Otwani	Wanderers Cricket Ground, Windhoek	Namibia by 7 wickets
T20I 1143	5 April	Gerhard Erasmus	Arnold Otwani	Wanderers Cricket Ground, Windhoek	Namibia by 20 runs (DLS)
T20I 1144	5 April	Gerhard Erasmus	Arnold Otwani	Wanderers Cricket Ground, Windhoek	Namibia by 65 runs

=== 2020–21 Nepal Tri-Nation Series ===
Team	P	W	L	T	NR	Pts	NRR
Nepal	4	3	1	0	0	6	+2.507
Netherlands	4	2	1	1	0	5	–0.425
Malaysia	4	0	3	1	0	1	–2.359

Round-robin
No.	Date	Team 1	Captain 1	Team 2	Captain 2	Venue	Result
T20I 1149	17 April	Nepal	Gyanendra Malla	Netherlands	Pieter Seelaar	Tribhuvan University International Cricket Ground, Kirtipur	Nepal by 9 wickets
T20I 1150	18 April	Malaysia	Ahmad Faiz	Netherlands	Pieter Seelaar	Tribhuvan University International Cricket Ground, Kirtipur	Netherlands by 15 runs
T20I 1151	19 April	Nepal	Gyanendra Malla	Malaysia	Ahmad Faiz	Tribhuvan University International Cricket Ground, Kirtipur	Nepal by 9 wickets
T20I 1152	20 April	Nepal	Gyanendra Malla	Netherlands	Pieter Seelaar	Tribhuvan University International Cricket Ground, Kirtipur	Netherlands by 3 wickets
T20I 1153	21 April	Malaysia	Ahmad Faiz	Netherlands	Pieter Seelaar	Tribhuvan University International Cricket Ground, Kirtipur	Match tied (DLS)
T20I 1155	22 April	Nepal	Gyanendra Malla	Malaysia	Ahmad Faiz	Tribhuvan University International Cricket Ground, Kirtipur	Nepal by 69 runs
Final
T20I 1157	24 April	Nepal	Gyanendra Malla	Netherlands	Pieter Seelaar	Tribhuvan University International Cricket Ground, Kirtipur	Nepal by 142 runs

=== Malta in Belgium ===
The series was postponed in April 2021 due to the COVID-19 pandemic.

=== Romania in Belgium ===
The series was postponed in April 2021 due to the COVID-19 pandemic.

== See also ==
- International cricket in 2020–21
- Impact of the COVID-19 pandemic on cricket
