= 2020 Netherlands Quadrangular Series =

Cricket tournament

- Dates: 18 – 30 June 2020
- Administrator: Koninklijke Nederlandse Cricket Bond (KNCB)
- Cricket format: One-Day International (ODIs)
- Host: Netherlands
- Participants: 4

The 2020 Netherlands Quadrangular Series was a cricket tournament that was scheduled to take place in June 2020 in the Netherlands. The series would have been played between the Netherlands, Namibia, Oman and the United States, with all the matches played as One Day Internationals (ODIs). However, on 22 April 2020, the Dutch government announced that it had banned all events in the country, both sports and cultural, until 1 September 2020 due to the COVID-19 pandemic.
