= Irish cricket team in Zimbabwe in 2019–20 =

International cricket tour

| | Zimbabwe | Ireland |
- Dates: 2 – 12 April 2020

One Day International series

Twenty20 International series

The Ireland cricket team were scheduled to tour Zimbabwe in April 2020 to play three One Day International (ODI) and three Twenty20 International (T20I) matches. All of the matches were scheduled to take place at the Queens Sports Club in Bulawayo. Ireland last toured Zimbabwe in March 2018 for the Cricket World Cup Qualifier, and last played bilateral series in Zimbabwe in October 2015. However, on 16 March 2020, the tour was cancelled due to the COVID-19 pandemic.

An attempt to play the fixtures in April 2021 was called off in February 2021, due to the ongoing situation regarding the pandemic in Zimbabwe. However, Zimbabwe Cricket issued a statement saying that the tour had been called off due to "scheduling challenges" and not the COVID-19 pandemic.

== T20I series ==
=== 1st T20I ===
2 April 2020
10:00
Scorecard

| Zimbabwe | v | Ireland |

Queens Sports Club, Bulawayo

=== 2nd T20I ===
4 April 2020
10:00
Scorecard

| Zimbabwe | v | Ireland |

Queens Sports Club, Bulawayo

=== 3rd T20I ===
5 April 2020
10:00
Scorecard

| Zimbabwe | v | Ireland |

Queens Sports Club, Bulawayo

== ODI series ==
=== 1st ODI ===
8 April 2020
10:00
Scorecard

| Zimbabwe | v | Ireland |

Queens Sports Club, Bulawayo

=== 2nd ODI ===
10 April 2020
10:00
Scorecard

| Zimbabwe | v | Ireland |

Queens Sports Club, Bulawayo

=== 3rd ODI ===
12 April 2020
10:00
Scorecard

| Zimbabwe | v | Ireland |

Queens Sports Club, Bulawayo
