= Ireland women's cricket team against Scotland in Spain in 2020–21 =

International cricket tour

	Ireland women	Scotland women
- Dates: 23 – 28 November 2020
Captains	Laura Delany	Kathryn Bryce

Twenty20 International series

The Ireland women's cricket team were scheduled to play the Scotland women's cricket team in Spain in November 2020. The tour would have consisted of two 50-over matches and three Women's Twenty20 Internationals (WT20Is). All of the matches would have been played at the La Manga Club in Cartagena, played behind closed doors, due to COVID-19 restrictions. Shortly before the scheduled tour, the Spanish government had increased restrictions in the country due to a second wave of the virus. Both teams and the match officials were scheduled to stay in the same hotel in a secure bio-environment.

However, in November 2020, the tour was called off due to the COVID-19 pandemic, after Scotland withdrew from the series. An attempt was made to reschedule to series for March 2021. However, the series was called off after the health authorities in Spain made an extension on travel restrictions on UK citizens until the end of the month. Both cricket boards expressed their disappointment at the cancellation, with the Scotland team planning to use the matches as their preparation for the 2021 ICC Women's T20 World Cup Europe Qualifier tournament.

== Squads ==
Ireland	Scotland
Laura Delany (c); Zara Craig; Rachel Delaney; Georgina Dempsey; Amy Hunter; Shauna Kavanagh; Gaby Lewis; Louise Little; Sophie MacMahon; Jane Maguire; Cara Murray; Leah Paul; Orla Prendergast; Celeste Raack; Rebecca Stokell	Kathryn Bryce (c); Sarah Bryce (vc, wk); Abbi Aitken-Drummond; Priyanaz Chatterji; Ikra Farooq; Katherine Fraser; Becky Glen; Samantha Haggo; Ailsa Lister; Abtaha Maqsood; Megan McColl; Katherine Mills; Charis Scott; Ellen Watson

== 50-over series ==
=== 1st 50-over match ===
23 November 2020

Ireland	v	Scotland

La Manga Club, Cartagena

=== 2nd 50-over match ===
25 November 2020

Ireland	v	Scotland

La Manga Club, Cartagena

== WT20I series ==
=== 1st WT20I ===
27 November 2020

Ireland	v	Scotland

La Manga Club, Cartagena

=== 2nd WT20I ===
27 November 2020

Ireland	v	Scotland

La Manga Club, Cartagena

=== 3rd WT20I ===
28 November 2020

Ireland	v	Scotland

La Manga Club, Cartagena
