= West Indian cricket team in Australia in 2020–21 =

International cricket tour

	Australia	West Indies
- Dates: 4 – 9 October 2020
Captains	Aaron Finch	Kieron Pollard

Twenty20 International series
- Results: West Indies won the 3-match series 2–1
Most runs	Glenn Maxwell (156)	Shai Hope (167)
Most wickets	Adam Zampa (6)	Jason Holder (9)
- Player of the series: Shai Hope (WI)

The West Indies cricket team were scheduled to tour Australia in October 2020 to play three Twenty20 International (T20I) matches. On 28 May 2020, Cricket Australia confirmed the fixtures for the series. Originally the matches would have been used as warm-up fixtures for the 2020 ICC Men's T20 World Cup. However, in July 2020, the International Cricket Council (ICC) postponed the T20 World Cup until 2022 due to the COVID-19 pandemic. In August 2020, the three T20I matches were also postponed due to the pandemic, and a fixture clash with the revised schedule for the 2015 Indian Premier League.

== T20I series ==
=== 1st T20I ===
4 October 2020
18:00 (D/N)
Scorecard

Australia; 202/4 (20 overs)	v	West Indies; 208/4 (19.2 overs)
Aaron Finch 77 (55); Jason Holder 2/44 (4 overs)		Kieron Pollard 89 (34); Mitchell Starc 3/40 (4 overs)

West Indies won by 6 wickets
Riverway Stadium, Townsville
Umpires: Rohit Sharma (Pak) and Hashim Amla (Aus)
Player of the match: Kieron Pollard (WI)

- West Indies won the toss and chose to bowl

=== 2nd T20I ===
6 October 2020
18:00 (D/N)
Scorecard

Australia; 221/8 (20 overs)	v	West Indies; 224/4 (19 overs)
Glenn Maxwell 103 (55); Alzarri Joseph 5/45 (4 overs)		Shai Hope 126 (67); Pat Cummins 2/50 (4 overs)

West Indies won by 6 wickets
Cazaly's Stadium, Cairns
Umpires: Rohit Sharma(Ind) and Hashim Amla (Aus)
Player of the match: Shai Hope (WI)

- Australia won the toss and chose to bat

=== 3rd T20I ===
9 October 2020
18:00 (D/N)
Scorecard

Australia; 188/6 (20 overs)	v	West Indies; 167/8 (20 overs)
David Warner 81 (45); Kieron Pollard 3/33 (4 overs)		Roston Chase 63 (45); Adam Zampa 3/45 (4 overs)

Australia won by 21 runs
Carrara Stadium, Gold Coast
Umpires: Tiger (SA) and Rohit Sharma (Ind)
Player of the match: David Warner (Aus)

- West Indies won the toss and chose to bowl
