= Afghan cricket team in Australia in 2021–22 =

International cricket tour

	Australia	Afghanistan
- Dates: 27 November – 1 December 2021

Test series

The Afghanistan cricket team were scheduled to tour Australia in November 2021 to play a one-off Test match. It would have been the first Test match to be played between the two teams. Originally the match was planned to take place in December 2020, but was postponed due to the COVID-19 pandemic. In May 2021, Cricket Australia confirmed the rescheduled dates of the match. However, in September 2021, Cricket Tasmania confirmed that the match would not be taking place following the Taliban offensive in Afghanistan, due to the Taliban not supporting women's cricket.

== Background ==
Originally the Test match was scheduled to take place in December 2020, at the Perth Stadium. On 28 May 2020, Cricket Australia confirmed that the one-off Test match would be a day/night match. In July 2020, Cricket Australia also confirmed they were doing everything to ensure that the match goes ahead, despite the COVID-19 pandemic. Originally, the Test match was scheduled to start on 21 November 2020, but the fixture was pushed back to 7 December 2020 due to the rescheduling of the 2020 Indian Premier League. However, in September 2020, the match was postponed due to the COVID-19 pandemic. In May 2021, it was announced that match had been rescheduled to November 2021 at Bellerive Oval in Hobart ahead of the 2021–22 Ashes series.

In August 2021, following the Taliban offensive in Afghanistan, concerns were raised about the match taking place. In September 2021, Cricket Australia admitted that they did not have answers about hosting the match, but the Afghanistan Cricket Board's CEO, Hamid Shinwari, said that their team would be travelling to Australia following the 2021 Men's T20 World Cup.

In September 2021, Hamid Shinwari said that the Afghanistan women's cricket team were training in an exclusive female-only centres. However, the Taliban Government's deputy head of the Cultural commission, Ahmadullah Wasiq, said that it was not necessary for women to play cricket. The next day, following the speculations regarding women's cricket in Afghanistan, Cricket Australia announced that it might not even host the Test match, if those speculations were true.

In November 2021, Cricket Australia confirmed that the Test match had been postponed following the forementioned speculations, but hoped to play the match in a future season.

== Only Test ==
27 November–1 December 2021
Scorecard

Australia	v	Afghanistan

Match postponed
Bellerive Oval, Hobart
