= Australian cricket team in New Zealand in 2019–20 =

International cricket tour

	New Zealand	Australia
- Dates: 24 – 29 March 2020

Twenty20 International series

The Australia cricket team were scheduled to tour New Zealand in March 2020 to play three Twenty20 International (T20I) matches. New Zealand Cricket confirmed the fixtures for the tour in June 2019. However, on 14 March 2020, the tour was cancelled due to the COVID-19 pandemic.

== T20I series ==
=== 1st T20I ===
24 March 2020
14:00
Scorecard

New Zealand	v	Australia

University Oval, Dunedin

=== 2nd T20I ===
27 March 2020
19:00 (N)
Scorecard

New Zealand	v	Australia

Eden Park No. 1, Auckland

=== 3rd T20I ===
29 March 2020
14:00
Scorecard

New Zealand	v	Australia

Hagley Oval, Christchurch
