= 2022 United Arab Emirates Women's Quadrangular Series =

International cricket tournament

2022 UAE Women's Quadrangular Series
- Dates: 10 – 13 September 2022
- Administrator: Emirates Cricket Board
- Cricket format: Twenty20 International
- Tournament format: Round-robin
- Host: United Arab Emirates
- Champions: Zimbabwe
- Runners-up: Thailand
- Participants: 4
- Matches: 6
- Most runs: (Thailand) Nannapat Koncharoenkai (88)
- Most wickets: (United Arab Emirates) Vaishnave Mahesh (6)

The 2022 United Arab Emirates Women's Quadrangular Series was a Twenty20 International (T20I) cricket tournament hosted in Dubai from 10 to 13 September 2022. The participants were the women's national sides of United Arab Emirates, Thailand, United States and Zimbabwe. The tournament provided all four teams with preparation for the 2022 ICC Women's T20 World Cup Qualifier.

Zimbabwe won all three of their matches to finish top of the table.

== Squads ==
Thailand	United Arab Emirates	United States	Zimbabwe
Naruemol Chaiwai (c); Nannapat Koncharoenkai (vc, wk); Nattaya Boochatham; Nanthita Boonsukham; Natthakan Chantam; Sunida Chaturongrattana; Onnicha Kamchomphu; Rosenan Kanoh; Suwanan Khiaoto; Suleeporn Laomi; Phannita Maya; Thipatcha Putthawong; Aphisara Suwanchonrathi; Chanida Sutthiruang; Sornnarin Tippoch	Chaya Mughal (c); Natasha Cherriath; Samaira Dharnidharka; Kavisha Egodage; Siya Gokhale; Priyanjali Jain (wk); Lavanya Keny; Suraksha Kotte; Vaishnave Mahesh; Indhuja Nandakumar; Esha Oza; Rinitha Rajith; Rithika Rajith; Theertha Satish (wk); Khushi Sharma	Sindhu Sriharsha (c, wk); Bhumika Bhadriraju; Gargi Bhogle; Disha Dhingra; Moksha Chaudhary; Taranum Chopra; Prithi Iyengar; Geetika Kodali; Anika Kolan; Snigdha Paul; Lisa Ramjit; Ritu Singh; Yashaaditi Teki; Suhani Thadani; Isani Vaghela	Mary-Anne Musonda (c); Christabel Chatonzwa; Francisca Chipare; Precious Marange; Sharne Mayers; Audrey Mazvishaya; Esther Mbofana; Chipo Mugeri-Tiripano; Pellagia Mujaji (wk); Modester Mupachikwa (wk); Kelis Ndlovu; Josephine Nkomo; Loryn Phiri; Nomvelo Sibanda; Loreen Tshuma

== Points Table ==
Pos	Team	Pld	W	L	NR	Pts	NRR
1	Zimbabwe	3	3	0	0	6	1.442
2	Thailand	3	2	1	0	4	1.016
3	United States	3	1	2	0	2	−0.929
4	United Arab Emirates	3	0	3	0	0	−1.515

Source: ESPNcricinfo

== Fixtures ==
10 September 2022
11:00
Scorecard

United States; 111 (19.3 overs)	v	Zimbabwe; 112/5 (15.2 overs)
Snigdha Paul 26 (40); Nomvelo Sibanda 3/20 (4 overs)		Chipo Mugeri-Tiripano 37 (37); Isani Vaghela 2/9 (2 overs)

Zimbabwe won by 5 wickets
ICC Academy Ground, Dubai
Umpires: Shiju Sam (UAE) and Hemangi Yerzal (UAE)
Player of the match: Nomvelo Sibanda (Zim)

- Zimbabwe Women won the toss and elected to field.
- Bhumika Bhadriraju, Disha Dhingra, Taranum Chopra, Prithi Iyengar, Snigdha Paul and Ritu Singh (USA) all made their WT20I debuts.

10 September 2022
14:30
Scorecard

United Arab Emirates; 105/8 (20 overs)	v	Thailand; 107/5 (17.2 overs)
Kavisha Egodage 35* (44); Chanida Sutthiruang 2/11 (2 overs)		Natthakan Chantam 49* (45); Vaishnave Mahesh 2/21 (4 overs)

Thailand Women won by 5 wickets
ICC Academy Ground, Dubai
Umpires: Akbar Ali (UAE) and Gawie Botha (SA)
Player of the match: Natthakan Chantam (Tha)

- United Arab Emirates Women won the toss and elected to bat.
- Phannita Maya (Tha) made her WT20I debut.

12 September 2022
10:00
Scorecard

Zimbabwe; 152/2 (20 overs)	v	United Arab Emirates; 105/9 (20 overs)
Modester Mupachikwa 75* (62); Suraksha Kotte 1/15 (2 overs)		Theertha Satish 39 (30); Loryn Phiri 3/8 (3 overs)

Zimbabwe Women won by 47 runs
ICC Academy Ground, Dubai
Umpires: Akbar Ali (UAE) and Shiju Sam (UAE)
Player of the match: Modester Mupachikwa (Zim)

- Zimbabwe Women won the toss and elected to bat.

12 September 2022
14:00
Scorecard

United States; 79/8 (20 overs)	v	Thailand; 82/0 (11.3 overs)
Sindhu Sriharsha 50* (61); Nattaya Boochatham 2/16 (4 overs)		Nannapat Koncharoenkai 42* (40)

Thailand Women won by 10 wickets
ICC Academy Ground, Dubai
Umpires: Gawie Botha (SA) and Hemangi Yerzal (UAE)
Player of the match: Natthakan Chantam (Tha)

- United States Women won the toss and elected to bat.
- Sunida Chaturongrattana (Tha) and Yashaaditi Teki (USA) both made their WT20I debuts.

13 September 2022
10:00
Scorecard

Thailand; 102/5 (20 overs)	v	Zimbabwe; 106/7 (18.4 overs)
Nannapat Koncharoenkai 28 (46); Nomvelo Sibanda 2/14 (4 overs)		Sharne Mayers 48 (29); Sunida Chaturongrattana 2/9 (2 overs)

Zimbabwe Women won by 3 wickets
ICC Academy Ground, Dubai
Umpires: Akbar Ali (UAE) and Hemangi Yerzal (UAE)
Player of the match: Sharne Mayers (Zim)

- Thailand Women won the toss and elected to bat.

13 September 2022
14:00
Scorecard

United States; 104/8 (20 overs)	v	United Arab Emirates; 79 (19.4 overs)
Lisa Ramjit 27 (33); Vaishnave Mahesh 4/12 (4 overs)		Natasha Cherriath 27* (24); Bhumika Bhadriraju 4/9 (4 overs)

United States Women won by 25 runs
ICC Academy Ground, Dubai
Umpires: Aasif Iqbal (UAE) and Shiju Sam (UAE)
Player of the match: Bhumika Bhadriraju (USA)

- United States Women won the toss and elected to bat.
