= 2019 Women's T20 World Cup Americas Qualifier =

International cricket tournament

2019 ICC Women's Qualifier Americas
- Dates: 17 – 19 May 2019
- Administrator: International Cricket Council
- Cricket format: Twenty20 International
- Tournament format: Best of three matches
- Host: United States
- Champions: United States
- Runners-up: Canada
- Participants: 2
- Matches: 3
- Most runs: (United States) Sindhu Sriharsha (80)
- Most wickets: (United States) Lisa Ramjit (5)

The 2019 ICC Women's Qualifier Americas was a cricket tournament that was held in the United States in May 2019. The matches in the tournament were played as Women's Twenty20 Internationals (WT20Is), with the top team progressing to both the 2019 ICC Women's World Twenty20 Qualifier and the 2021 Women's Cricket World Cup Qualifier tournaments. The United States qualified for both tournaments, after taking an unassailable 2–0 lead, with wins in their first two matches. The United States also won the final match by 36 runs, therefore completing a 3–0 whitewash over Canada.

The qualifier was played as a best of three matches, with the fixtures played in Lauderhill, Florida. The United States named their squad on 1 April 2019, with Canada naming their squad on 9 May 2019.

== Teams ==
The following teams competed in the tournament:

- Canada
- United States

== Points table ==
Pos	Team	Pld	W	L	T	NR	Pts	NRR	
1	United States (H)	3	3	0	0	0	6	2.203	Advanced to qualifying tournament
2	Canada	3	0	3	0	0	0	−2.203	Eliminated

(H) Host

== Fixtures ==
=== 1st WT20I ===
17 May 2019
11:00
Scorecard

Canada; 66/6 (20 overs)	v	United States; 67/0 (10 overs)
Kamna Mirchandani 24 (52); Lisa Ramjit 2/5 (4 overs)		Erica Rendler 47* (35)

United States Women won by 10 wickets
Central Broward Regional Park, Lauderhill
Umpires: Arnold Maddela (Can) and Jacqueline Williams (WI)
Player of the match: Erica Rendler (USA)

- United States Women won the toss and elected to field.
- Claudine Beckford, Erica Rendler, Lisa Ramjit, Nadia Gruny, Onika Wallerson, Samantha Ramautar, Sara Farooq, Shebani Bhaskar, Sindhu Sriharsha, Sugetha Chandhrasekar, Uzma Iftikhar (USA), Miryam Khokhar, Achini Perera, Kamna Mirchandani, Chuntell Martin, Mahewish Khan, Saniyah Zia, Habeeba Bader, Hiba Shamshad, Hala Azmat, Kainat Qazi and Maliha Baig (Can) all made their WT20I debuts.

=== 2nd WT20I ===
18 May 2019
11:00
Scorecard

United States; 113/6 (20 overs)	v	Canada; 76 (18.2 overs)
Sindhu Sriharsha 38 (30); Mahewish Khan 2/11 (4 overs)		Chuntell Martin 20 (17); Uzma Iftikhar 4/19 (4 overs)

United States Women won by 37 runs
Central Broward Regional Park, Lauderhill
Umpires: Arnold Maddela (Can) and Jacqueline Williams (WI)
Player of the match: Uzma Iftikhar (USA)

- Canada Women won the toss and elected to field.
- Monali Patel (Can) made her WT20I debut.

=== 3rd WT20I ===
19 May 2019
11:00
Scorecard

United States; 116/6 (20 overs)	v	Canada; 81/6 (20 overs)
Sindhu Sriharsha 42* (33); Saniyah Zia 3/22 (4 overs)		Saniyah Zia 15* (20); Lisa Ramjit 3/11 (4 overs)

United States Women won by 35 runs
Central Broward Regional Park, Lauderhill
Umpires: Sameer Bandekar (USA) and Arnold Maddela (Can)
Player of the match: Sindhu Sriharsha (USA)

- United States of America Women won the toss and elected to bat.
- Candacy Atkins and Geetika Kodali (USA) both made their WT20I debuts.
