= 2022 Women's T20 World Cup Qualifier =

Cricket tournament

2022 ICC Women's T20 World Cup Qualifier
- Dates: 18 – 25 September 2022
- Administrator: International Cricket Council
- Cricket format: Twenty20 International
- Tournament format(s): Group stages, playoffs
- Host: United Arab Emirates
- Champions: Bangladesh (3rd title)
- Runners-up: Ireland
- Participants: 8
- Matches: 20
- Player of the series: (Bangladesh) Nigar Sultana
- Most runs: (Papua New Guinea) Tanya Ruma (198)
- Most wickets: (Zimbabwe) Kelis Ndhlovu (11)

The 2022 ICC Women's T20 World Cup Qualifier was an international women's cricket tournament held in September 2022. It was the fifth edition of the Women's T20 World Cup Qualifier and served as the qualification tournament for the 2023 ICC Women's T20 World Cup tournament. Both finalists from the qualifier tournament progressed to the 2023 ICC Women's T20 World Cup in South Africa.

At the conclusion of the group stage, Bangladesh, Ireland, Thailand and Zimbabwe progressed to the semi-finals which would determine the two places at the T20 World Cup. In the first semi-final, Ireland narrowly defeated Zimbabwe by 4 runs to secure a place in the T20 World Cup. Bangladesh claimed the remaining place in the World Cup by defeating Thailand by 11 runs in the second semi-final. Bangladesh went on to defeat Ireland by seven runs in the final, winning the qualifier for the third consecutive time.

== Qualification ==
In December 2020 the ICC confirmed the qualification process for the tournament, with 37 teams scheduled to take part across five regional groups. The two teams at the bottom of the ICC Women's T20I Rankings on 30 November 2021, of those who competed at the 2020 ICC Women's T20 World Cup in Australia, entered the Qualifier. They were joined by the five winners of each of the Regional Qualifier tournaments. The final place went to the highest ranked team from the Regional Qualifiers as of 30 November 2021, who did not win their regional group.

On 30 August 2021, Scotland became the first team to advance to the Qualifier, winning the Europe tournament. Later the same day, the International Cricket Council (ICC) confirmed that the EAP qualifier had been cancelled due to the COVID-19 pandemic. As a result, the highest-ranked EAP team as of 30 November 2021 also went through.

Means of Qualification	Date	Host	Berths	Qualified
Automatic Qualifications
2020 World T20	November 2021	Tournament results	2	Bangladesh; Thailand
Regional Qualifications
Europe	26–30 August 2021	Spain	1	Scotland
East Asia-Pacific	Cancelled	Samoa	1	Papua New Guinea
Africa	9–19 September 2021	Botswana	1	Zimbabwe
Americas	18–25 October 2021	Mexico	1	United States
Asia	22–28 November 2021	United Arab Emirates	1	United Arab Emirates
Highest ranked Regional Qualifier
ICC T20I Rankings			1	Ireland
Total			8	

== Squads ==
Bangladesh	Ireland	Papua New Guinea	Scotland
Nigar Sultana (c, wk); Rumana Ahmed; Marufa Akter; Nahida Akter; Sharmin Akhter; Shohely Akhter; ~~Jahanara Alam~~; Fargana Hoque; Fahima Khatun; Murshida Khatun; Salma Khatun; Sanjida Akter Meghla; Lata Mondal; Ritu Moni; Sobhana Mostary; Sharmin Sultana (wk); Fariha Trisna	Laura Delany (c); Rachel Delaney; Georgina Dempsey; Amy Hunter; Shauna Kavanagh; Arlene Kelly; Gaby Lewis; Sophie MacMahon; Jane Maguire; Cara Murray; Leah Paul; Orla Prendergast; Eimear Richardson; Rebecca Stokell; Mary Waldron (wk)	Kaia Arua (c); Melanie Ani; Vicky Araa; Hollan Doriga; Kevau Frank; Veru Frank; Sibona Jimmy; Ravina Oa; Tanya Ruma; Pauke Siaka; Brenda Tau (wk); Henao Thomas; Geua Tom (wk); Mairi Tom; Isabel Toua; Naoani Vare	Kathryn Bryce (c); Abbi Aitken-Drummond; Olivia Bell; Sarah Bryce (wk); Priyanaz Chatterji; Katherine Fraser; Saskia Horley; Lorna Jack; Ailsa Lister; Abtaha Maqsood; Megan McColl; Katie McGill; Hannah Rainey; Rachel Slater; Ellen Watson
Thailand	United Arab Emirates	United States	Zimbabwe
Naruemol Chaiwai (c); Nannapat Koncharoenkai (vc, wk); Nattaya Boochatham; Nanthita Boonsukham; Natthakan Chantam; Sunida Chaturongrattana; Onnicha Kamchomphu; Rosenan Kanoh; Suwanan Khiaoto; Suleeporn Laomi; Phannita Maya; Thipatcha Putthawong; Aphisara Suwanchonrathi; Chanida Sutthiruang; Sornnarin Tippoch	Chaya Mughal (c); Natasha Cherriath; Samaira Dharnidharka; Kavisha Egodage; Siya Gokhale; Priyanjali Jain (wk); Lavanya Keny; Suraksha Kotte; Vaishnave Mahesh; Indhuja Nandakumar; Esha Oza; Rinitha Rajith; Rithika Rajith; Theertha Satish (wk); Khushi Sharma	Sindhu Sriharsha (c, wk); Bhumika Bhadriraju; ~~Gargi Bhogle~~; ~~Moksha Chaudhary~~; Taranum Chopra; Disha Dhingra; Sai Tanmayi Eyyunni; Preeti Iyenger; Mahika Kandanala; Geetika Kodali; Anika Kolan; Snigdha Paul; Lisa Ramjit; Ritu Singh; Yashaditi Teka; Suhani Thadani; Isani Vaghela	Mary-Anne Musonda (c); Christabel Chatonzwa; Francisca Chipare; Precious Marange; Sharne Mayers; Audrey Mazvishaya; Esther Mbofana; Chipo Mugeri-Tiripano; Pellagia Mujaji; Modester Mupachikwa (wk); Kelis Ndhlovu; Josephine Nkomo; Loryn Phiri; Nomvelo Sibanda; Loreen Tshuma

Gargi Bhogle was unable to recover from a finger injury and was replaced in the United States squad by Mahika Kandanala. Moksha Chaudhary was ruled out of the qualifier for medical reasons and was replaced in the United States squad by Sai Tanmayi Eyyunni. Jahanara Alam was ruled out of the tournament due to a hand injury and was replaced in the Bangladesh squad by Fariha Trisna. Fargana Hoque also missed the tournament after contracting COVID-19 and was replaced by Shohely Akhter.

== Warm-up matches ==
16 September 2022
15:00
Scorecard

Ireland; 141/8 (20 overs)	v	Papua New Guinea; 104/5 (20 overs)
Amy Hunter 45 (37); Kaia Arua 2/23 (4 overs)		Sibona Jimmy 22 (24); Arlene Kelly 2/18 (4 overs)

Ireland won by 37 runs
Tolerance Oval, Abu Dhabi
Umpires: Buddhi Pradhan (Nep) and Raveendra Wimalasiri (SL)
Player of the match: Amy Hunter (Ire)

- Ireland won the toss and elected to bat.

16 September 2022
15:00
Scorecard

Thailand; 168/5 (20 overs)	v	United States; 104/5 (20 overs)
Naruemol Chaiwai 42* (41); Disha Dhingra 1/12 (2 overs)		Disha Dhingra 55 (51); Onnicha Kamchomphu 2/14 (4 overs)

Thailand won by 64 runs
Sheikh Zayed Cricket Stadium, Abu Dhabi
Umpires: Vrinda Rathi (Ind) and Sharfuddoula (Ban)
Player of the match: Sornnarin Tippoch (Tha)

- Thailand won the toss and elected to bat.

16 September 2022
19:00 (N)
Scorecard

Zimbabwe; 94 (19.2 overs)	v	Scotland; 85 (18 overs)
Mary-Anne Musonda 30 (29); Saskia Horley 2/4 (2 overs)		Priyanaz Chatterji 32 (31); Kelis Ndhlovu 6/16 (4 overs)

Zimbabwe won by 9 runs
Tolerance Oval, Abu Dhabi
Umpires: Narayanan Janani (Ind) and Raveendra Wimalasiri (SL)
Player of the match: Kelis Ndhlovu (Zim)

- Scotland won the toss and elected to field.

16 September 2022
19:00 (N)
Scorecard

Bangladesh; 124/5 (20 overs)	v	United Arab Emirates; 70/9 (20 overs)
Sobhana Mostary 39 (32); Khushi Sharma 2/21 (4 overs)		Theertha Satish 19 (21); Lata Mondal 5/5 (3 overs)

Bangladesh won by 54 runs
Sheikh Zayed Cricket Stadium, Abu Dhabi
Umpires: Lauren Agenbag (SA) and Sharfuddoula (Ban)
Player of the match: Lata Mondal (Ban)

- Bangladesh won the toss and elected to bat.

== Group stage ==
=== Group A ===
==== Points table ====
Pos	Team	Pld	W	L	NR	Pts	NRR
1	Bangladesh	3	3	0	0	6	2.001
2	Ireland	3	2	1	0	4	0.925
3	Scotland	3	1	2	0	2	0.338
4	United States	3	0	3	0	0	−3.064

Source: ESPNcricinfo

Advanced to play-offs
Advanced to consolation play-offs

==== Fixtures ====
18 September 2022
19:00 (N)
Scorecard

Bangladesh; 143/4 (20 overs)	v	Ireland; 129 (19.4 overs)
Nigar Sultana 67 (53); Leah Paul 1/20 (2 overs)		Eimear Richardson 40 (26); Salma Khatun 3/19 (4 overs)

Bangladesh won by 14 runs
Sheikh Zayed Cricket Stadium, Abu Dhabi
Umpires: Narayanan Janani (Ind) and Buddhi Pradhan (Nep)
Player of the match: Nigar Sultana (Ban)

- Bangladesh won the toss and elected to bat.

18 September 2022
19:00 (N)
Scorecard

Scotland; 130/5 (20 overs)	v	United States; 51 (19.1 overs)
Sarah Bryce 45 (32); Bhumika Bhadriraju 2/13 (2 overs)		Mahika Kandanala 10 (13); Katherine Fraser 2/7 (3.1 overs)

Scotland won by 79 runs
Tolerance Oval, Abu Dhabi
Umpires: Lauren Agenbag (SA) and Vrinda Rathi (Ind)
Player of the match: Sarah Bryce (Sco)

- Scotland won the toss and elected to bat.
- Sai Tanmayi Eyyunni (USA) made her WT20I debut.

19 September 2022
19:00 (N)
Scorecard

Scotland; 77 (19.3 overs)	v	Bangladesh; 78/4 (13 overs)
Lorna Jack 22 (23); Shohely Akhter 4/7 (4 overs)		Nigar Sultana 34 (43); Rachel Slater 2/13 (3 overs)

Bangladesh won by 6 wickets
Sheikh Zayed Cricket Stadium, Abu Dhabi
Umpires: Buddhi Pradhan (Nep) and Raveendra Wimalasiri (SL)
Player of the match: Shohely Akhter (Ban)

- Scotland won the toss and elected to bat.

19 September 2022
19:00 (N)
Scorecard

United States; 91 (20 overs)	v	Ireland; 92/1 (13.1 overs)
Sindhu Sriharsha 25 (26); Arlene Kelly 2/17 (4 overs)		Gaby Lewis 44* (38); Sai Tanmayi Eyyunni 1/22 (4 overs)

Ireland won by 9 wickets
Tolerance Oval, Abu Dhabi
Umpires: Lauren Agenbag (SA) and Sharfuddoula (Ban)
Player of the match: Amy Hunter (Ire)

- United States won the toss and elected to bat.

21 September 2022
15:00
Scorecard

Bangladesh; 158/1 (20 overs)	v	United States; 103/3 (20 overs)
Murshida Khatun 77* (64); Snigdha Paul 1/24 (4 overs)		Sindhu Sriharsha 74* (71); Salma Khatun 1/12 (3 overs)

Bangladesh won by 55 runs
Sheikh Zayed Cricket Stadium, Abu Dhabi
Umpires: Buddhi Pradhan (Nep) and Vrinda Rathi (Ind)
Player of the match: Murshida Khatun (Ban)

- Bangladesh won the toss and elected to bat.

21 September 2022
15:00
Scorecard

Ireland; 164/3 (20 overs)	v	Scotland; 145/8 (20 overs)
Gaby Lewis 66 (37); Kathryn Bryce 1/27 (4 overs)		Sarah Bryce 49 (35); Jane Maguire 2/19 (3 overs)

Ireland won by 19 runs
Tolerance Oval, Abu Dhabi
Umpires: Narayanan Janani (Ind) and Sharfuddoula (Ban)
Player of the match: Gaby Lewis (Ire)

- Ireland won the toss and elected to bat.

=== Group B ===
==== Points table ====
Pos	Team	Pld	W	L	NR	Pts	NRR
1	Zimbabwe	3	2	1	0	4	0.894
2	Thailand	3	2	1	0	4	0.293
3	Papua New Guinea	3	1	2	0	2	−0.270
4	United Arab Emirates	3	1	2	0	2	−0.928

Source: ESPNcricinfo

Advanced to play-offs
Advanced to consolation play-offs

==== Fixtures ====
18 September 2022
15:00
Scorecard

United Arab Emirates; 92/5 (20 overs)	v	Thailand; 96/3 (16.2 overs)
Kavisha Egodage 40* (44); Nattaya Boochatham 2/17 (4 overs)		Natthakan Chantam 39 (37); Suraksha Kotte 1/4 (0.2 overs)

Thailand won by 7 wickets
Sheikh Zayed Cricket Stadium, Abu Dhabi
Umpires: Buddhi Pradhan (Nep) and Raveendra Wimalasiri (SL)
Player of the match: Nattaya Boochatham (UAE)

- United Arab Emirates won the toss and elected to bat.

18 September 2022
15:00
Scorecard

Papua New Guinea; 83 (18 overs)	v	Zimbabwe; 87/2 (14.4 overs)
Tanya Ruma 25 (35); Kelis Ndhlovu 3/18 (4 overs)		Sharne Mayers 33 (28); Kaia Arua 2/21 (3.4 overs)

Zimbabwe won by 8 wickets
Tolerance Oval, Abu Dhabi
Umpires: Lauren Agenbag (SA) and Sharfuddoula (Ban)
Player of the match: Sharne Mayers (Zim)

- Papua New Guinea won the toss and elected to bat.
- Hollan Doriga (PNG) made her WT20I debut.

19 September 2022
15:00
Scorecard

Thailand; 86/6 (20 overs)	v	Zimbabwe; 87/4 (16.4 overs)
Nannapat Koncharoenkai 47* (53); Nomvelo Sibanda 2/12 (4 overs)		Kelis Ndhlovu 46 (40); Thipatcha Putthawong 1/12 (4 overs)

Zimbabwe won by 6 wickets
Sheikh Zayed Cricket Stadium, Abu Dhabi
Umpires: Narayanan Janani (Ind) and Raveendra Wimalasiri (SL)
Player of the match: Kelis Ndhlovu (Zim)

- Thailand won the toss and elected to bat.

19 September 2022
15:00
Scorecard

Papua New Guinea; 148/6 (20 overs)	v	United Arab Emirates; 119/8 (20 overs)
Tanya Ruma 53 (36); Samaira Dharnidharka 3/22 (4 overs)		Theertha Satish 68 (56); Ravina Oa 2/18 (4 overs)

Papua New Guinea won by 29 runs
Tolerance Oval, Abu Dhabi
Umpires: Vrinda Rathi (Ind) and Sharfuddoula (Ban)
Player of the match: Tanya Ruma (PNG)

- United Arab Emirates won the toss and elected to field.

21 September 2022
19:00 (N)
Scorecard

Thailand; 93/8 (20 overs)	v	Papua New Guinea; 81/6 (20 overs)
Chanida Sutthiruang 36* (32); Vicky Araa 4/23 (4 overs)		Tanya Ruma 35 (53); Nattaya Boochatham 4/8 (4 overs)

Thailand won by 12 runs
Sheikh Zayed Cricket Stadium, Abu Dhabi
Umpires: Vrinda Rathi (Ind) and Raveendra Wimalasiri (SL)
Player of the match: Chanida Sutthiruang (Tha)

- Thailand won the toss and elected to bat.
- Geua Tom (PNG) made her WT20I debut.

21 September 2022
19:00 (N)
Scorecard

Zimbabwe; 120/7 (20 overs)	v	United Arab Emirates; 121/6 (20 overs)
Sharne Mayers 23 (23); Vaishnave Mahesh 3/15 (4 overs)		Kavisha Egodage 41* (57); Loreen Tshuma 2/18 (4 overs)

United Arab Emirates won by 4 wickets
Tolerance Oval, Abu Dhabi
Umpires: Lauren Agenbag (SA) and Narayanan Janani (Ind)
Player of the match: Kavisha Egodage (UAE)

- Zimbabwe won the toss and elected to bat.

== Consolation play-offs ==
=== 5th place semi-finals ===
23 September 2022
15:00
Scorecard

Scotland; 172/4 (20 overs)	v	United Arab Emirates; 87 (18.5 overs)
Ailsa Lister 60 (44); Samaira Dharnidharka 2/24 (3 overs)		Theertha Satish 34 (37); Katie McGill 2/6 (3 overs)

Scotland won by 85 runs
Tolerance Oval, Abu Dhabi
Umpires: Narayanan Janani (Ind) and Raveendra Wimalasiri (SL)
Player of the match: Ailsa Lister (Sco)

- United Arab Emirates won the toss and elected to field.
- Olivia Bell (Sco) made her WT20I debut.

23 September 2022
19:00 (N)
Scorecard

United States; 76/9 (20 overs)	v	Papua New Guinea; 77/3 (11 overs)
Isani Vaghela 17 (36); Vicky Araa 3/13 (4 overs)		Sibona Jimmy 33 (30); Suhani Thadani 1/7 (2 overs)

Papua New Guinea won by 7 wickets
Tolerance Oval, Abu Dhabi
Umpires: Sharfuddoula (Ban) and Raveendra Wimalasiri (SL)
Player of the match: Sibona Jimmy (PNG)

- Papua New Guinea won the toss and elected to field.

=== 7th place play-off ===
25 September 2022
15:00
Scorecard

United States; 117/3 (20 overs)	v	United Arab Emirates; 118/5 (20 overs)
Lisa Ramjit 48* (55); Esha Oza 1/12 (4 overs)		Esha Oza 37 (28); Sai Tanmayi Eyyunni 2/18 (4 overs)

United Arab Emirates won by 5 wickets
Tolerance Oval, Abu Dhabi
Umpires: Narayanan Janani (Ind) and Raveendra Wimalasiri (SL)
Player of the match: Esha Oza (UAE)

- United States won the toss and elected to bat.

=== 5th place play-off ===
25 September 2022
19:00 (N)
Scorecard

Scotland; 168/6 (20 overs)	v	Papua New Guinea; 169/2 (18.4 overs)
Kathryn Bryce 63* (47); Sibona Jimmy 2/24 (3 overs)		Tanya Ruma 63* (31); Katie McGill 1/28 (3 overs)

Papua New Guinea won by 8 wickets
Tolerance Oval, Abu Dhabi
Umpires: Narayanan Janani (Ind) and Sharfuddoula (Ban)
Player of the match: Tanya Ruma (PNG)

- Scotland won the toss and elected to bat.

== Play-offs ==
=== Semi-finals ===
23 September 2022
15:00
Scorecard

Ireland; 137/6 (20 overs)	v	Zimbabwe; 133/6 (20 overs)
Orla Prendergast 28 (25); Nomvelo Sibanda 2/24 (4 overs)		Sharne Mayers 39 (36); Jane Maguire 2/18 (4 overs)

Ireland won by 4 runs
Sheikh Zayed Cricket Stadium, Abu Dhabi
Umpires: Vrinda Rathi (Ind) and Sharfuddoula (Ban)
Player of the match: Jane Maguire (Ire)

- Zimbabwe won the toss and elected to field.

23 September 2022
19:00 (N)
Scorecard

Bangladesh; 113/5 (20 overs)	v	Thailand; 102/6 (20 overs)
Rumana Ahmed 28* (24); Rosenan Kanoh 1/13 (4 overs)		Natthakan Chantam 64 (51); Salma Khatun 3/18 (4 overs)

Bangladesh won by 11 runs
Sheikh Zayed Cricket Stadium, Abu Dhabi
Umpires: Lauren Agenbag (SA) and Buddhi Pradhan (Nep)
Player of the match: Natthakan Chantam (Tha)

- Thailand won the toss and elected to field.
- Nanthita Boonsukham (Tha) made her WT20I debut.

=== 3rd place play-off ===
25 September 2022
15:00
Scorecard

Zimbabwe; 118/6 (20 overs)	v	Thailand; 111/6 (20 overs)
Chipo Mugeri-Tiripano 39* (27); Thipatcha Putthawong 2/31 (4 overs)		Nannapat Koncharoenkai 42 (50); Kelis Ndhlovu 3/15 (3 overs)

Zimbabwe won by 7 runs
Sheikh Zayed Cricket Stadium, Abu Dhabi
Umpires: Buddhi Pradhan (Nep) and Sharfuddoula (Ban)
Player of the match: Kelis Ndhlovu (Zim)

- Thailand won the toss and elected to field.
- Suwanan Khiaoto (Tha) made her WT20I debut.

=== Final ===
25 September 2022
19:00 (N)
Scorecard

Bangladesh; 120/8 (20 overs)	v	Ireland; 113/9 (20 overs)
Fargana Hoque 61 (55); Laura Delany 3/27 (4 overs)		Arlene Kelly 28* (24); Rumana Ahmed 3/24 (4 overs)

Bangladesh won by 7 runs
Sheikh Zayed Cricket Stadium, Abu Dhabi
Umpires: Lauren Agenbag (SA) and Vrinda Rathi (Ind)
Player of the match: Rumana Ahmed (Ban)

- Bangladesh won the toss and elected to bat.

== Final standings ==
Position	Team
1st	Bangladesh
2nd	Ireland
3rd	Zimbabwe
4th	Thailand
5th	Papua New Guinea
6th	Scotland
7th	United Arab Emirates
8th	United States

Qualified for the 2023 ICC Women's T20 World Cup.
