= 2024 United Arab Emirates Women's Quadrangular Series =

International cricket tournament

2024 UAE Women's Quadrangular Series
- Dates: 16 – 19 April 2024
- Administrator: Emirates Cricket Board
- Cricket format: Twenty20 International
- Tournament format: Round-robin
- Host: United Arab Emirates
- Participants: 4
- Matches: 6

The 2024 United Arab Emirates Women's Quadrangular Series was a Twenty20 International (T20I) cricket tournament that was scheduled to be played in Abu Dhabi from 16 to 19 April 2024. The tournament would have been contested by women's national sides of United Arab Emirates, Netherlands, Scotland and the United States. The tournament would have provided all four teams with preparation for the 2024 ICC Women's T20 World Cup Qualifier.

Unprecedented rainfall and flooding in the region caused all six scheduled games in the tournament to be abandoned.

== Squads ==
Netherlands	Scotland	United Arab Emirates	United States
Heather Siegers (c); Merel Dekeling; Caroline de Lange; Babette de Leede (wk); Sanya Khurana; Hannah Landheer; Eva Lynch; Phebe Molkenboer; Frederique Overdijk; Robine Rijke; Silver Siegers; Myrthe van den Raad; Carlijn van Koolwijk; Jolien van Vliet; Iris Zwilling	Kathryn Bryce (c); Chloe Abel; Sarah Bryce; Darcey Carter; Priyanaz Chatterji; Katherine Fraser; Saskia Horley; Lorna Jack (wk); Ailsa Lister (wk); Abtaha Maqsood; Megan McColl; Hannah Rainey; Nayma Sheikh; Rachel Slater; Ellen Watson (wk)	Esha Oza (c, wk); Samaira Dharnidharka; Kavisha Egodage; Siya Gokhale; Heena Hotchandhani; Al Maseera Jahangir; Lavanya Keny; Suraksha Kotte; Vaishnave Mahesh; Indhuja Nandakumar; Avanee Patil; Rinitha Rajith; Theertha Satish (wk); Khushi Sharma; Mehak Thakur	Sindhu Sriharsha (c); Anika Kolan (vc, wk); Jivana Aras; Gargi Bhogle; Aditiba Chudasama; Disha Dhingra; Pooja Ganesh; Saanvi Immadi; Geetika Kodali; Pooja Shah; Ritu Singh; Sai Tanmayi Eyyunni; Suhani Thadani; Isani Vaghela; Jessica Willathgamuwa

== Points table ==
Pos	Team	Pld	W	L	NR	Pts	NRR
1	Netherlands	3	0	0	3	3	—
2	Scotland	3	0	0	3	3	—
3	United Arab Emirates	3	0	0	3	3	—
4	United States	3	0	0	3	3	—

Source: ESPNcricinfo

== Fixtures ==
16 April 2024
15:00
Scorecard

United Arab Emirates	v	Netherlands

Match abandoned
Sheikh Zayed Cricket Stadium, Abu Dhabi
Umpires: Gawie Botha (SA) and Hemangi Yerzal (UAE)

- No toss.
- No play was possible due to rain.

16 April 2024
19:00
Scorecard

Scotland	v	United States

Match abandoned
Sheikh Zayed Cricket Stadium, Abu Dhabi
Umpires: Gawie Botha (SA) and Hemangi Yerzal (UAE)

- No toss.
- No play was possible due to rain.

17 April 2024
15:00
Scorecard

United Arab Emirates	v	United States

Match abandoned
Sheikh Zayed Cricket Stadium, Abu Dhabi
Umpires: Imran Munir (UAE) and Hemangi Yerzal (UAE)

- No toss.
- No play was possible due to rain.

17 April 2024
19:00
Scorecard

Netherlands	v	Scotland

Match abandoned
Sheikh Zayed Cricket Stadium, Abu Dhabi
Umpires: Imran Munir (UAE) and Hemangi Yerzal (UAE)

- No toss.
- No play was possible due to rain.

19 April 2024
15:00
Scorecard

Netherlands	v	United States

Match abandoned
Tolerance Oval, Abu Dhabi
Umpires: Gawie Botha (SA) and Hemangi Yerzal (UAE)

- No toss.
- No play was possible due to rain.

19 April 2024
19:00
Scorecard

United Arab Emirates	v	Scotland

Match abandoned
Tolerance Oval, Abu Dhabi
Umpires: Gawie Botha (SA) and Hemangi Yerzal (UAE)

- No toss.
- No play was possible due to rain.
