= 2024 United Arab Emirates women's Tri-Nation Series =

International cricket tournament

2024 UAE women's Tri-Nation Series
- Date: 11–14 April 2024
- Location: United Arab Emirates
- Result: Scotland won the series
Teams
Papua New Guinea	Scotland	United States
Captains
Brenda Tau	Kathryn Bryce	Sindhu Sriharsha
Most runs
Tanya Ruma (100)	Sarah Bryce (104)	Disha Dhingra (81)
Most wickets
Isabel Toua (5)	Abtaha Maqsood (4)	Jessica Willathgamuwa (3); Aditiba Chudasama (3); Ritu Singh (3)

The 2024 United Arab Emirates women's Tri-Nation Series was a cricket tournament that took place in the United Arab Emirates in April 2024. The tri-nation series featured the women's national teams of Papua New Guinea, Scotland and the United States. The matches were played with One Day International (ODI) status. These were the first ever matches to be played with ODI status by the United States women's team.

== Squads ==
Papua New Guinea	Scotland	United States
Brenda Tau (c, wk); Sibona Jimmy (vc); Melanie Ani; Vicky Ara'a; Vicky Buruka; Kevau Frank; Dika Lohia; Lakshmi Rajadurai; Tanya Ruma; Pauke Siaka; Henao Thomas; Geua Tom; Isabel Toua; Naoani Vare	Kathryn Bryce (c); Chloe Abel; Sarah Bryce (wk); Darcey Carter; Priyanaz Chatterji; Katherine Fraser; Saskia Horley; Lorna Jack (wk); Ailsa Lister (wk); Abtaha Maqsood; Megan McColl; Hannah Rainey; Nayma Sheikh; Rachel Slater; Ellen Watson (wk)	Sindhu Sriharsha (c, wk); Anika Kolan (vc, wk); Jivana Aras; Gargi Bhogle; Aditiba Chudasama; Disha Dhingra; Pooja Ganesh (wk); Saanvi Immadi; Geetika Kodali; Pooja Shah; Ritu Singh; Sai Tanmayi Eyyunni; Suhani Thadani; Isani Vaghela; Jessica Willathgamuwa

== Points table ==
Pos	Team	Pld	W	L	NR	Pts	NRR
1	Scotland	2	2	0	0	4	1.450
2	Papua New Guinea	2	1	1	0	2	−0.562
3	United States	2	0	2	0	0	−1.107

Source: ESPNcricinfo

== ODI series ==
=== 1st ODI ===
11 April 2024
13:00 (D/N)
Scorecard

United States; 160 (44.2 overs)	v	Papua New Guinea; 164/4 (36.2 overs)
Disha Dhingra 58 (77); Isabel Toua 4/38 (10 overs)		Tanya Ruma 80* (93); Ritu Singh 2/31 (9 overs)

Papua New Guinea won by 6 wickets
ICC Academy Ground, Dubai
Umpires: Akbar Ali (UAE) and Aasif Iqbal (UAE)
Player of the match: Isabel Toua (PNG)

- United States won the toss and elected to bat.
- Gargi Bhogle, Aditiba Chudasama, Disha Dhingra, Saanvi Immadi, Geetika Kodali, Anika Kolan, Ritu Singh, Sindhu Sriharsha, Suhani Thadani, Isani Vaghela and Jessica Willathgamuwa (USA) all made their ODI debuts.

=== 2nd ODI ===
12 April 2024
13:00 (D/N)
Scorecard

Scotland; 217 (45.4 overs)	v	Papua New Guinea; 113 (34.5 overs)
Kathryn Bryce 73 (80); Pauke Siaka 3/20 (6 overs)		Kevau Frank 31 (53); Saskia Horley 3/22 (7 overs)

Scotland won by 104 runs
ICC Academy Ground, Dubai
Umpires: Akbar Ali (UAE) and Aasif Iqbal (UAE)
Player of the match: Saskia Horley (Sco)

- Papua New Guinea won the toss and elected to field.
- Katherine Fraser and Saskia Horley (Sco) both made their ODI debuts.

=== 3rd ODI ===
14 April 2024
13:00 (D/N)
Scorecard

Scotland; 251/7 (50 overs)	v	United States; 210/9 (50 overs)
Kathryn Bryce 84 (122); Aditiba Chudasama 2/41 (10 overs)		Gargi Bhogle 35 (49); Abtaha Maqsood 4/30 (10 overs)

Scotland won by 41 runs
ICC Academy Ground, Dubai
Umpires: Akbar Ali (UAE) and Aasif Iqbal (UAE)
Player of the match: Abtaha Maqsood (Sco)

- Scotland won the toss and elected to bat.
- Chloe Abel, Rachel Slater (Sco), Jivana Aras and Pooja Ganesh (USA) all made their ODI debuts.
