= Zimbabwe women's cricket team in the United States in 2025 =

International cricket tour

Zimbabwe women's cricket team in United States in 2025
	United States	Zimbabwe
- Dates: 25 April – 3 May 2025
Captains	Aditiba Chudasama	Chipo Mugeri-Tiripano

One Day International series
- Results: 2-match series drawn 1–1
Most runs	Chetna Pagydyala (70)	Loreen Tshuma (137)
Most wickets	Aditiba Chudasama (3)	Adel Zimunu (2)

Twenty20 International series
- Results: Zimbabwe won the 3-match series 2–1
Most runs	Disha Dhingra (77)	Loreen Tshuma (88)
Most wickets	Geetika Kodali (6)	Beloved Biza (5)

The Zimbabwe women's cricket team toured the United States in April and May 2025 to play the United States women's cricket team. The tour consisted of two One Day International (ODI) and three Twenty20 International (T20I) matches. In April 2025, the USA Cricket (USAC) confirmed the fixtures for the tour.

== Squads ==
United States		Zimbabwe
ODIs	T20Is	ODIs & T20Is
Aditiba Chudasama (c); Chetna Pagydyala (vc); Jivana Aras; Gargi Bhogle; Disha Dhingra; Pooja Ganesh (wk); Saanvi Immadi; Mitali Patwardhan (wk); Chetnaa Prasad; Geetika Kodali; Maahi Madhavan; Bhakti Shastri; Ritu Singh; Isani Vaghela	Aditiba Chudasama (c); Chetna Pagydyala (vc); Disha Dhingra; Pooja Ganesh (wk); Saanvi Immadi; Mitali Patwardhan (wk); Chetnaa Prasad; Geetika Kodali; Maahi Madhavan; Lekha Shetty; Ritu Singh; Yashaaditi Teki; Suhani Thadani; Jessica Willathgamuwa	Chipo Mugeri-Tiripano (c); Beloved Biza; Francisca Chipare; Chiedza Dhururu (wk); Lindokuhle Mabhero; Tendai Makusha; Precious Marange; Natasha Mtomba; Modester Mupachikwa (wk); Kelis Ndhlovu; Josephine Nkomo; Runyararo Pasipanodya; Nomvelo Sibanda; Loreen Tshuma; Adel Zimunu

United States also named Jessica Willathgamuwa, Lekha Shetty and Pooja Shah as reserves for the T20I series and Gargi Bhogle, Jivana Aras and Sai Tanmayi Eyyunni for the ODI series. Zimbabwe also named Nyasha Gwanzura and Kelly Ndiraya as non-travelling reserves.

== T20I series ==
=== 1st T20I ===
25 April 2025
10:30
Scorecard

Zimbabwe; 124/7 (20 overs)	v	United States; 96/6 (20 overs)
Loreen Tshuma 38 (27); Geetika Kodali 3/25 (4 overs)		Chetna Pagydyala 25 (30); Beloved Biza 3/18 (4 overs)

Zimbabwe won by 28 runs
Grand Prairie Stadium, Dallas
Umpires: Jermaine Lindo (USA) and Vijaya Mallela (USA)
Player of the match: Beloved Biza (Zim)

- United States won the toss and elected to field.
- Bhakti Shastri, Maahi Madhavan (USA), Natasha Mtomba and Adel Zimunu (Zim) all made their T20I debuts.
- This was the first women's T20I to be played at this venue.

=== 2nd T20I ===
27 April 2025
10:30
Scorecard

Zimbabwe; 136/5 (20 overs)	v	United States; 135/6 (20 overs)
Loreen Tshuma 46 (37); Jivana Aras 2/18 (3 overs)		Disha Dhingra 57 (45); Adel Zimunu 2/26 (3 overs)

Zimbabwe won by 1 run
Grand Prairie Stadium, Dallas
Umpires: Vijaya Mallela (USA) and Rushane Samuels (WI)
Player of the match: Loreen Tshuma (Zim)

- United States won the toss and elected to field.

=== 3rd T20I ===
29 April 2025
10:30
Scorecard

Zimbabwe; 110/8 (20 overs)	v	United States; 111/7 (20 overs)
Kelis Ndhlovu 49 (46); Isani Vaghela 3/16 (4 overs); Chetnaa Prasad 3/16 (4 overs)		Gargi Bhogle 34 (27); Lindokuhle Mabhero 2/19 (4 overs)

United States won by 3 wickets
Grand Prairie Stadium, Dallas
Umpires: Jermaine Lindo (USA) and Rushane Samuels (WI)
Player of the match: Gargi Bhogle (USA)

- United States won the toss and elected to field.

== ODI series ==
=== 1st ODI ===
1 May 2025
10:00
Scorecard

Zimbabwe; 162/9 (40 overs)	v	United States; 163/3 (38.1 overs)
Beloved Biza 64 (79); Saanvi Immadi 2/26 (8 overs)		Chetna Pagydyala 59* (108); Adel Zimunu 1/19 (6 overs)

United States won by 7 wickets
Grand Prairie Stadium, Dallas
Umpires: Jermaine Lindo (USA) and Vijaya Mallela (USA)
Player of the match: Aditiba Chudasama (USA)

- United States won the toss and elected to field.
- The match was reduced to 40 overs per side due to rain.
- Maahi Madhavan, Mitali Patwardhan and Chetnaa Prasad (USA) all made their ODI debuts.
- This was the first women's ODI to be played at this venue.

=== 2nd ODI ===
3 May 2025
10:00
Scorecard

Zimbabwe; 270/3 (50 overs)	v	United States; 142 (42.1 overs)
Loreen Tshuma 137 (149); Ritu Singh 1/38 (9 overs)		Pooja Ganesh 45 (81); Runyararo Pasipanodya 1/11 (3 overs)

Zimbabwe won by 128 runs
Grand Prairie Stadium, Dallas
Umpires: Jermaine Lindo (USA) and Rushane Samuels (WI)
Player of the match: Loreen Tshuma (Zim)

- United States won the toss and elected to field.
- Loreen Tshuma (Zim) scored her first century in ODIs.
