= Sugetha Chandhrasekar =

American cricketer

Personal information
- Full name: Sugetha Kalyanaraman Chandhrasekar
- Born: 24 February 1991 (age 35); Tirupattur, Tamil Nadu, India
- Batting: Right-handed
- Bowling: Legbreak

International information
- National side: United States
- T20I debut (cap 3): 17 May 2019 v Canada
- Last T20I: 7 September 2019 v Namibia

Career statistics
Competition	WT20I
Matches	7
Runs scored	76
Batting average	15.20
100s/50s	0/0
Top score	32
Catches/stumpings	1/–
- Source: Cricinfo, 4 May 2021

Sugetha Chandhrasekar (born 24 February 1991) is an American cricketer. She made her Women's Twenty20 International (WT20I) debut for the United States women's cricket team on 17 May 2019, against Canada, in the 2019 ICC Women's Qualifier Americas tournament.

In August 2019, she was named in United States' squad for the 2019 ICC Women's World Twenty20 Qualifier tournament in Scotland. She played in the United States' opening match of the tournament, on 31 August 2019, against Scotland.

In February 2021, she was named in the Women's National Training Group by the USA Cricket Women's National Selectors ahead of the 2021 Women's Cricket World Cup Qualifier and the 2021 ICC Women's T20 World Cup Americas Qualifier tournaments.
