= Shebani Bhaskar =

American cricketer

Personal information
- Full name: Shebani Mandhakini Bhaskar
- Born: October 7, 1994 (age 32); Evergreen Park, Illinois, U.S.
- Batting: Right-handed
- Bowling: Right-arm leg break
- Role: Wicket-keeper

International information
- National side: United States
- T20I debut (cap 2): 17 May 2019 v Canada
- Last T20I: 25 October 2021 v Argentina

Domestic team information
- Years: Team
- 2008/09–2018/19: Tamil Nadu
- 2016/17: Otago
- 2018–2018/19: Leeward Islands

Career statistics
Competition	WT20I
Matches	14
Runs scored	180
Batting average	18.00
100s/50s	0/0
Top score	30
Catches/stumpings	2/–
- Source: Cricinfo, 10 November 2022

Shebani Mandhakini Bhaskar (born October 7, 1994) is an American cricketer who plays for the United States. She plays as a right-handed batter, wicket-keeper and occasional right-arm leg break bowler. She has appeared in 8 Twenty20 Internationals for the US. She previously played domestic cricket for Tamil Nadu, Otago and Leeward Islands.

== Biography ==
Bhaskar was born in Evergreen Park, Illinois, United States to a Tamil family. During her childhood, her family moved several times and they have lived in Hamburg, Dhaka, and Alexandria, Virginia. Bhaskar, along with her family, moved to Kolkata in 2007 as her father, Bhaskar Rajah began working in the city. She was then selected to play for the West Bengali U16 cricket team at just the age of 11. In 2008, she and her family returned to Chennai, their native place.

She began playing cricket at the age of eleven and was also offered a chance to play for the Tamil Nadu cricket team. she has two sisters and her elder sister, Meenakshi Bhaskar is a rower. And her younger sister is Vijaishri Bhaskar

== Career ==
After Bhaskar got exposure into the domestic level cricket in India, she received the opportunity to play for United States cricket team at the 2011 Women's Cricket World Cup Qualifier.

In a match as a part of the 2011 World Cup Qualifiers, she helped the US cricket team to register a victory against Zimbabwe with a knock of 72 runs off 89 deliveries, and was adjudged Player Of The Match

In March 2018, Bhaskar was named captain of the U.S. women's national cricket team. In March 2019, she was named as the captain of the United States team for the 2019 ICC Women's Qualifier Americas tournament against Canada. She made her WT20I debut for the United States against Canada in the Americas Qualifier on 17 May 2019.

In August 2019, she was replaced by Sindhu Sriharsha as the captain of the national side for the 2019 ICC Women's World Twenty20 Qualifier and was named in the American squad for the 2019 ICC Women's World Twenty20 Qualifier tournament in Scotland. She played in the United States' opening match of the tournament, on 31 August 2019, against Scotland.

In February 2021, she was named in the Women's National Training Group by the USA Cricket Women's National Selectors ahead of the 2021 Women's Cricket World Cup Qualifier and the 2021 ICC Women's T20 World Cup Americas Qualifier tournaments. In September 2021, she was named as the vice-captain of the American team for the World Cup Qualifier tournament. In October 2021, she was named as the vice-captain of the American team for the 2021 Women's Cricket World Cup Qualifier tournament in Zimbabwe.
