= Tara Norris =

American cricketer (born 1998)

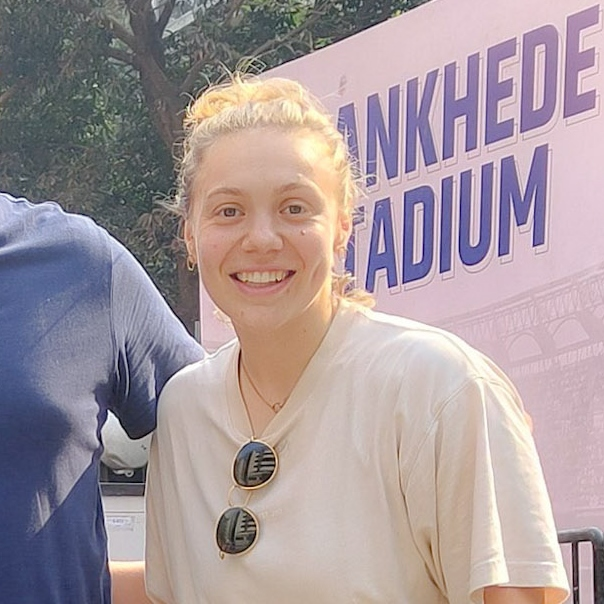
- Norris at Wankhede Stadium in 2023

Personal information
- Full name: Tara Gabriella Norris
- Born: 4 June 1998 (age 28); Philadelphia, Pennsylvania, U.S.
- Nickname: Noz; Tino
- Batting: Left-handed
- Bowling: Left-arm medium
- Role: Bowler

International information
- National side: United States
- ODI debut (cap 15): 17 October 2024 v Zimbabwe
- Last ODI: 28 October 2024 v Zimbabwe
- T20I debut (cap 19): 18 October 2021 v Brazil
- Last T20I: 25 October 2021 v Argentina

Domestic team information
- Years: Team
- 2014–present: Sussex
- 2017: Southern Vipers
- 2018–2019: Loughborough Lightning
- 2020–2022: Southern Vipers
- 2021–2022: Southern Brave
- 2023: Delhi Capitals
- 2023–2024: North West Thunder
- 2023–present: London Spirit
- 2024–present: Melbourne Renegades

Career statistics
| Competition | WT20I | WLA | WT20 |
|---|---|---|---|
| Matches | 5 | 81 | 103 |
| Runs scored | 15 | 559 | 366 |
| Batting average | 7.50 | 15.52 | 11.80 |
| 100s/50s | 0/0 | 0/2 | 0/1 |
| Top score | 13 | 53* | 59* |
| Balls bowled | 108 | 3,318 | 1,515 |
| Wickets | 4 | 89 | 80 |
| Bowling average | 7.75 | 26.40 | 19.55 |
| 5 wickets in innings | 0 | 0 | 1 |
| 10 wickets in match | 0 | 0 | 0 |
| Best bowling | 2/4 | 4/14 | 5/29 |
| Catches/stumpings | 0/– | 29/– | 28/– |
- Source: CricketArchive, 17 October 2024

Tara Gabriella Norris (born 4 June 1998) is an American cricketer who currently plays for Lancashire and MI London. She plays as a left-arm medium bowler. She has previously played for Sussex, Loughborough Lightning, Southern Vipers, North West Thunder and Southern Brave.

Norris was born in the United States and played for the United States women's national cricket team at the 2021 ICC Women's T20 World Cup Americas Qualifier.

== Early life ==
Norris was born on 4 June 1998 in Philadelphia, Pennsylvania, USA, and is half-English and half-Italian. She spent her early years in Spain, before moving to England at the age of eight. She attended Portslade Aldridge Community Academy and began playing for Horsham Cricket Club at a young age.

== Domestic career ==
Norris made her county debut in 2014, for Sussex against Warwickshire. She did not bat or bowl. A year later, she was part of the Sussex squad that won the 2015 Women's Twenty20 Cup. In the 2018 Women's County Championship, Norris had a strong season, taking 10 wickets at an average of 10.30 as her side was promoted from Division 2. In 2019, Norris again had a successful county season, being Sussex's second-leading wicket-taker in both competitions, and hitting her maiden county half-century, scoring 59* opening the batting in a T20 victory over Warwickshire. She was Sussex's joint-leading wicket-taker in the 2021 Women's Twenty20 Cup, with 7 wickets at an average of 11.71.

In the 2022 Women's Twenty20 Cup, Norris took eight wickets at an average of 7.87, including Twenty20 best bowling figures of 4/11, taken against Surrey.

In 2017, Norris also played for Southern Vipers in the Women's Cricket Super League. She played one match, bowling three overs and dismissing Jenny Gunn for her maiden KSL wicket. Ahead of the 2018 season, she moved to Loughborough Lightning, but did not play for them until 2019. Across her three appearances, she bowled three overs for no wicket.

In 2020, Norris returned to Southern Vipers for the Rachael Heyhoe Flint Trophy. She appeared in all 7 matches, including her side's 38-run victory in the Final over Northern Diamonds. She took 12 wickets at an average of 17.91, including taking 4/45 in a match against Western Storm. She was the joint-third leading wicket-taker across the whole tournament.

In 2021, she was the joint-second leading wicket-taker in the Charlotte Edwards Cup, with 13 wickets at an average of 13.30. She achieved her Twenty20 best bowling in the tournament against Lightning, taking 4/14 from her 3.5 overs. In the Rachael Heyhoe Flint Trophy, Norris took 11 wickets at an average of 30.09, including taking her List A best bowling figures, again 4/14, against North West Thunder. In the final of the Rachael Heyhoe Flint Trophy, Norris hit her List A best of 40* as part of an unbroken stand of 78 for the eighth wicket with Emily Windsor to help her side recover from 109/7 to win the match, and the tournament, by 3 wickets with two balls to spare. She also played six matches for Southern Brave in The Hundred, taking 3 wickets at an average of 22.66.

In 2022, Norris took two wickets in four appearances in the Charlotte Edwards Cup, and was Southern Vipers' leading wicket-taker in the Rachael Heyhoe Flint Trophy, with 12 wickets at an average of 19.75. She was again in the Southern Brave squad in The Hundred, but did not play a match. At the end of the 2022 season, it was announced that Norris had joined North West Thunder.

In 2023, she was Thunder's second-leading wicket-taker in both the Rachael Heyhoe Flint Trophy and the Charlotte Edwards Cup, with 10 and 9 wickets respectively. She also scored her maiden List A half-century, with 51* against Southern Vipers. She also played for London Spirit in The Hundred, taking two wickets in her six matches.

In 2024, Norris played 19 matches for North West Thunder, across the Rachael Heyhoe Flint Trophy and the Charlotte Edwards Cup, taking 13 wickets.

In February 2023, she was signed by Delhi Capitals ahead of the inaugural season of the Women's Premier League. She played five matches for the side as they reached the final of the tournament, taking 7 wickets at an average of 12.71. In her first match of the tournament, she took a five-wicket haul, with 5/29 against Royal Challengers Bangalore.

== International career ==
In September 2021, Norris was named in the United States squad for the 2021 ICC Women's T20 World Cup Americas Qualifier. She made her Twenty20 International debut in the first match of the tournament, against Brazil on 18 October 2021. She went on to play five of USA's six matches in the tournament as they qualified for the 2022 ICC Women's World Twenty20 Qualifier, taking 4 wickets at an average of 7.75. In October 2021, she was named in the American team for the 2021 Women's Cricket World Cup Qualifier tournament in Zimbabwe.

Norris has also appeared for various England Development and Academy teams, including touring South Africa in 2018.
