= Akshatha Rao =

American cricketer

Personal information
- Full name: Akshatha Gadahath Rao
- Born: 22 December 1983 (age 42); Shimoga, Karnataka, India
- Batting: Right-handed
- Bowling: Right-arm offbreak

International information
- National side: United States
- T20I debut (cap 14): 31 August 2019 v Scotland
- Last T20I: 24 October 2021 v Canada

Career statistics
Competition	WT20I
Matches	9
Runs scored	1
Batting average	1.00
100s/50s	0/0
Top score	1
Balls bowled	144
Wickets	6
Bowling average	20.16
5 wickets in innings	0
10 wickets in match	0
Best bowling	2/2
Catches/stumpings	1/–
- Source: ESPNcricinfo, 26 October 2021

Akshatha Rao (born 22 December 1983) is an American cricketer. In August 2019, she was named in United States' squad for the 2019 ICC Women's World Twenty20 Qualifier tournament in Scotland. She made her Women's Twenty20 International (WT20I) debut for the United States women's cricket team on 31 August 2019, against Scotland, in the 2019 ICC Women's World Twenty20 Qualifier. She was the leading wicket-taker for the United States in the tournament, with four dismissals in five matches.

In February 2021, she was named in the Women's National Training Group by the USA Cricket Women's National Selectors ahead of the 2021 Women's Cricket World Cup Qualifier and the 2021 ICC Women's T20 World Cup Americas Qualifier tournaments. In September 2021, she was named in the American team for the World Cup Qualifier tournament. In October 2021, she was named in the American team for the 2021 Women's Cricket World Cup Qualifier tournament in Zimbabwe.
