= Kamna Mirchandani =

Indian-born Canadian cricketer (born 1979)

Personal information
- Full name: Kamna Niresh Mirchandani
- Born: 3 October 1979 (age 47); Mumbai, Maharashtra, India
- Batting: Right-handed
- Bowling: Right-arm leg spin

International information
- National side: Canada
- T20I debut (cap 9): 17 May 2019 v United States
- Last T20I: 25 October 2021 v Brazil

Career statistics
Competition	WT20I
Matches	9
Runs scored	52
Batting average	8.66
100s/50s	0/0
Top score	24
Balls bowled	72
Wickets	1
Bowling average	87.00
5 wickets in innings	0
10 wickets in match	0
Best bowling	1/8
Catches/stumpings	2/–
- Source: ESPNcricinfo, 9 November 2022

Kamna Niresh Mirchandani (born 3 October 1979) is an Indian-born Canadian cricketer who is the captain of the Canadian women's cricket team. She played for Canada at the 2013 ICC Women's World Twenty20 Qualifier.

In May 2019, she was named in Canada's squad for the 2019 ICC Women's Qualifier Americas tournament against the United States. She made her WT20I debut against the United States in the Americas Qualifier on 17 May 2019.

In October 2021, she was named as the captain of the Canadian team for the 2021 ICC Women's T20 World Cup Americas Qualifier tournament in Mexico.
