= List of United States women ODI cricketers =

This is a list of United States Women One-day International cricketers.

In May 2022, the ICC awarded WODI status to the United States along with Netherlands, Papua New Guinea, Scotland and Thailand;

United States toured United Arab Emirates in April 2024, during which they played their first WODI match. This list comprises all members of the United States women's cricket team who have played at least one ODI match. It is initially arranged in the order in which each player won her first ODI cap. Where more than one player won her first WODI cap in the same match, those players are listed alphabetically by surname.

== Key ==
General

- ‡ – Captain
- † – Wicket-keeper
- First – Year of debut
- Last – Year of latest game
- Mat – Number of matches played

Batting

- Runs – Runs scored in career
- HS – Highest score
- Avg – Runs scored per dismissal
- * – Batsman remained not out
- 50 – Half-centuries scored
- 100 – Centuries scored

Bowling

- Balls – Balls bowled in career
- Wkt – Wickets taken in career
- BBI – Best bowling in an innings
- Ave – Average runs per wicket

Fielding

- Ca – Catches taken
- St – Stumpings affected

== List of players ==
Updated as of 3 May 2025.

United States women ODI cricketers
General					Batting					Bowling				Fielding		Ref
No.	Name	First	Last	Mat	Runs	HS	Avg	50	100	Balls	Wkt	BBI	Ave	Ca	St	Ref
1	Gargi Bhogle	2024	2024	6	82	36	13.66	0	0	–	–	–	–	4	0	
2	Aditiba Chudasama‡	2024	2025	9	121	41	20.16	0	0	496	13	3/33	25.07	1	0	
3	Disha Dhingra	2024	2025	9	289	58	32.11	2	0	–	–	–	–	1	0	
4	Saanvi Immadi	2024	2025	8	4	4	4.00	0	0	351	6	3/28	35.00	0	0	
5	Geetika Kodali	2024	2025	9	66	20	16.50	0	0	363	7	5/43	48.85	1	0	
6	Anika Kolan †	2024	2024	7	155	43	22.14	0	0	–	–	–	–	0	0	
7	Ritu Singh	2024	2025	6	38	18	9.50	0	0	258	6	2/31	34.83	1	0	
8	Sindhu Sriharsha‡†	2024	2024	7	200	69	50.00	1	0	–	–	–	–	6	2	
9	Suhani Thadani	2024	2024	1	6	6	6.00	0	0	18	0	–	–	0	0	
10	Isani Vaghela	2024	2024	6	45	20	9.00	0	0	210	3	2/36	67.66	0	0	
11	Jessica Willathgamuwa	2024	2025	4	20	18	6.66	0	0	134	4	2/41	24.50	1	0	
12	Jivana Aras	2024	2024	3	5	5*	–	0	0	120	1	1/34	95.00	1	0	
13	Pooja Ganesh†	2024	2025	3	49	45	24.50	0	0	–	–	–	–	2	1	
14	Ella Claridge	2024	2024	5	79	49*	19.75	0	0	–	–	–	–	2	0	
15	Tara Norris	2024	2024	5	59	31	29.50	0	0	252	7	3/55	26.00	1	0	
16	Lekha Shetty	2024	2024	2	8	8	8.00	0	0	36	0	–	–	0	0	
17	Chetna Pagydyala	2024	2025	3	206	136*	206.00	1	1	–	–	–	–	1	0	
18	Maahi Madhavan	2025	2025	2	1	1	1.00	0	0	90	1	1/21	74.00	0	0	
19	Mitali Patwardhan	2025	2025	2	1	1	0.50	0	0	–	–	–	–	0	0	
20	Chetnaa Prasad	2025	2025	2	6	6	6.00	0	0	84	0	–	–	0	0	
