= Saniyah Zia =

Pakistani-born Canadian cricketer (born 1985)

Personal information
- Full name: Saniyah Zia
- Born: April 11, 1985 (age 41); Pakistan
- Batting: Right-handed
- Bowling: Right arm medium

International information
- National side: Canada
- T20I debut (cap 11): 17 May 2019 v United States
- Last T20I: 11 September 2023 v United States

Career statistics
| Competition | WT20I |
|---|---|
| Matches | 13 |
| Runs scored | 58 |
| Batting average | 7.25 |
| 100s/50s | 0/0 |
| Top score | 16 |
| Balls bowled | 240 |
| Wickets | 14 |
| Bowling average | 11.35 |
| 5 wickets in innings | 0 |
| 10 wickets in match | 0 |
| Best bowling | 3/9 |
| Catches/stumpings | 6/– |
- Source: Cricinfo, 7 October 2024

Saniyah Zia (born 11 April 1985) is a Pakistani-born Canadian cricketer. She played for Canada at the 2013 ICC Women's World Twenty20 Qualifier.

In May 2019, she was named in Canada's squad for the 2019 ICC Women's Qualifier Americas tournament against the United States. She made her WT20I debut against the United States in the Americas Qualifier on 17 May 2019.

In October 2021, she was named in the Canadian team for the 2021 ICC Women's T20 World Cup Americas Qualifier tournament in Mexico.
