= Mahika Kandanala =

American cricketer

Personal information
- Full name: Mahika Kandanala
- Born: 6 August 2001 (age 25); Carrollton, Texas
- Batting: Right-handed
- Bowling: Right-arm medium

International information
- National side: United States
- T20I debut (cap 15): 5 September 2019 v Netherlands
- Last T20I: 18 September 2022 v Scotland

Career statistics
Competition	WT20I
Matches	6
Runs scored	47
Batting average	11.75
100s/50s	0/0
Top score	23
Balls bowled	4
Wickets	0
Bowling average	–
5 wickets in innings	0
10 wickets in match	0
Best bowling	–
Catches/stumpings	1/–
- Source: Cricinfo, 10 November 2022

Mahika Kandanala (born 6 August 2001) is an American cricketer. In August 2019, she was named in United States' squad for the 2019 ICC Women's World Twenty20 Qualifier tournament in Scotland. She made her Women's Twenty20 International (WT20I) debut for the United States women's cricket team on 5 September 2019, against the Netherlands in the 2019 ICC Women's World Twenty20 Qualifier.

In February 2021, she was named in the Women's National Training Group by the USA Cricket Women's National Selectors ahead of the 2021 Women's Cricket World Cup Qualifier and the 2021 ICC Women's T20 World Cup Americas Qualifier tournaments. In October 2021, she was named in the American team for the 2021 Women's Cricket World Cup Qualifier tournament in Zimbabwe.
