= Lisa Ramjit =

American cricketer

Personal information
- Full name: Lisa Ramjit
- Born: 1 October 2004 (age 22); Washington, D.C.
- Batting: Right-handed
- Bowling: Right-arm medium

International information
- National side: United States
- T20I debut (cap 8): 17 May 2019 v Canada
- Last T20I: 18 September 2022 v Scotland

Career statistics
Competition	WT20I
Matches	14
Runs scored	137
Batting average	27.40
100s/50s	0/0
Top score	48*
Balls bowled	150
Wickets	7
Bowling average	13.28
5 wickets in innings	0
10 wickets in match	0
Best bowling	3/11
Catches/stumpings	2/–
- Source: Cricinfo, 10 November 2022

Lisa Ramjit (born 1 October 2004) is an American cricketer. She made her Women's Twenty20 International (WT20I) debut for the United States women's cricket team on 17 May 2019, against Canada, in the 2019 ICC Women's Qualifier Americas tournament.

In August 2019, she was named in United States' squad for the 2019 ICC Women's World Twenty20 Qualifier tournament in Scotland. She played in the United States' opening match of the tournament, on 31 August 2019, against Scotland.

In February 2021, she was named in the Women's National Training Group by the USA Cricket Women's National Selectors ahead of the 2021 Women's Cricket World Cup Qualifier and the 2021 ICC Women's T20 World Cup Americas Qualifier tournaments. In October 2021, she was named in the American team for the 2021 Women's Cricket World Cup Qualifier tournament in Zimbabwe.

== Personal life ==
Her parents moved to the United States from Guyana, where they both played cricket. They are also of Indian descent. She grew up in Bowie, Maryland.
