= Uzma Iftikhar =

American cricketer

Personal information
- Full name: Uzma Iftikhar
- Born: 4 February 1987 (age 39); Karachi, Pakistan
- Batting: Right-handed
- Bowling: Right-arm offbreak
- Role: All-Rounder

International information
- National side: United States
- T20I debut (cap 6): 17 May 2019 v Canada
- Last T20I: 11 September 2023 v Canada

Career statistics
Competition	WT20I
Matches	14
Runs scored	16
Batting average	4.00
100s/50s	0/0
Top score	7
Balls bowled	270
Wickets	13
Bowling average	12.38
5 wickets in innings	0
10 wickets in match	0
Best bowling	4/19
Catches/stumpings	0/–
- Source: Cricinfo, 7 October 2024

Uzma Iftikhar (born 4 February 1987) is a Pakistani-born American cricketer. She made her Women's Twenty20 International (WT20I) debut for the United States women's cricket team on 17 May 2019, against Canada, in the 2019 ICC Women's Qualifier Americas tournament.

In August 2019, she was named in United States' squad for the 2019 ICC Women's World Twenty20 Qualifier tournament in Scotland. She played in the group-stage match between the United States and Papua New Guinea on 3 September 2019.

In February 2021, she was named in the Women's National Training Group by the USA Cricket Women's National Selectors ahead of the 2021 Women's Cricket World Cup Qualifier and the 2021 ICC Women's T20 World Cup Americas Qualifier tournaments. In September 2021, she was named in the American team for the World Cup Qualifier tournament. In October 2021, she was named in the American team for the 2021 Women's Cricket World Cup Qualifier tournament in Zimbabwe.
