= Hilton Moreeng =

South African cricketer and coach

Personal information
- Full name: Hilton Kgosimang Moreeng
- Born: 1 February 1978 (age 48); Kimberley, Cape Province, South Africa
- Batting: Right-handed
- Role: Wicket-keeper

Domestic team information
- Years: Team
- 2001–2007: Free State

Career statistics
Competition	FC	LA
Matches	6	3
Runs scored	34	19
Batting average	4.85	9.50
100s/50s	0/0	0/0
Top score	12	15
Catches/stumpings	15/0	2/0
- Source: CricketArchive, 25 November 2015

Hilton Kgosimang Moreeng (born 1 February 1978) is a former South African cricketer who is currently head coach of the United States women's national cricket team. He was formerly head coach of the South Africa women's national cricket team.

Moreeng was born in Kimberley, but played all his domestic cricket for Free State. A wicket-keeper and right-handed batsman, his first-class debut came against Northerns in October 2001, during the 2001–02 season of the SuperSport Series. Moreeng remained in the side for another three matches after his debut, but struggled with his batting, scoring only 14 runs from four innings. He was eventually replaced as wicket-keeper by Morne van Wyk for the remainder of the season, and did not make any further appearances for Free State until almost six years later. Moreeng was recalled to the team for a final stint during the 2007–08 season, making a total of five appearances in the CSA Provincial Competitions – two in the three-day format and three in the one-day format.

After retiring from playing, Moreeng took up coaching, gaining a Level III certification from Cricket South Africa. In December 2012, he was appointed coach of the South Africa women's national cricket team, replacing Yashin Ebrahim-Hassen.

After 11 years in the position including leading the team to the final of the 2023 ICC Women's T20 World Cup, Moreeng left his job with South Africa in May 2024. He was appointed head coach of the United States women's national cricket team in July 2024.
