= Ailsa Lister =

Scottish cricketer (born 2004)

Personal information
- Born: 8 April 2004 (age 22); Elgin, Moray, Scotland
- Batting: Right-handed
- Role: Wicket-keeper

International information
- National side: Scotland
- ODI debut (cap 24): 17 October 2023 v Ireland
- Last ODI: 14 April 2024 v USA
- T20I debut (cap 19): 24 May 2021 v Ireland
- Last T20I: 13 October 2024 v England
- T20I shirt no.: 23

Domestic team information
- Years: Team
- 2024–present: North West Thunder

Career statistics
Competition	WODI	WT20I
Matches	4	38
Runs scored	80	530
Batting average	20.00	18.27
100s/50s	0/9	0/4
Top score	47	68*
Balls bowled	–	–
Wickets	–	–
Bowling average	–	–
5 wickets in innings	–	–
10 wickets in match	–	–
Best bowling	–	–
Catches/stumpings	1/–	10/1
- Source: Cricinfo, 16 October 2024

Ailsa Lister (born 8 April 2004) is a Scottish cricketer. In October 2020, Lister was named in Scotland's squad to play Ireland at the La Manga Club during their tour of Spain. However, the matches were called off due to the COVID-19 pandemic. In May 2021, Lister was again named in Scotland's squad to face Ireland, this time for a four-match Women's Twenty20 International (WT20I) series in Belfast. She made her WT20I debut on 24 May 2021, for Scotland against Ireland.

In January 2022, she was named in Scotland's team for the 2022 Commonwealth Games Cricket Qualifier tournament in Malaysia. In March 2024, it was announced that she had signed a professional contract with North West Thunder.

In September 2024, she was named in the Scotland squad for the 2024 ICC Women's T20 World Cup.

Lister was part of the Scotland squad for the 2025 Women's Cricket World Cup Qualifier in Pakistan in April 2025.
