= Moksha Chaudhary =

American cricketer

Personal information
- Born: 17 December 1989 (age 36); Patiala, Punjab, India
- Batting: Right-handed
- Bowling: Right-arm medium

International information
- National side: United States
- T20I debut (cap 17): 18 October 2021 v Brazil
- Last T20I: 25 October 2021 v Argentina

Domestic team information
- Years: Team
- 2007–2012: Punjab Women
- 2012: India Blue Women
- Source: ESPNcricinfo, 15 November 2021

Moksha Chaudhary (born 17 December 1989) is an Indian-born American cricketer who plays for the United States women's national cricket team. Chaudhary was born in Patiala, India, and was in contention to represent India at the 2013 Women's Cricket World Cup. She moved to the United States in 2017, and played in her first US cricket tournament in June 2018.

In September 2021, Chaudhary was named in the American Women's Twenty20 International (WT20I) team for the 2021 ICC Women's T20 World Cup Americas Qualifier tournament in Mexico. She made her WT20I debut on 18 October 2021, in the opening match of the tournament against Brazil. The following month, she was also named in America's squad for the 2021 Women's Cricket World Cup Qualifier tournament in Zimbabwe.
