= Priyanjali Jain =

Indian-born Emirati cricketer (born 1991)

Personal information
- Full name: Priyanjali Jain
- Born: 8 October 1991 (age 35); India
- Batting: Right-handed
- Role: Wicket-keeper-batter

International information
- National side: United Arab Emirates
- T20I debut (cap 22): 22 November 2021 v Malaysia
- Last T20I: 5 October 2022 v Malaysia

Career statistics
Competition	WT20I
Matches	17
Runs scored	15
Batting average	2.14
100s/50s	0/0
Top score	5
Catches/stumpings	7/2
- Source: Cricinfo, 5 October 2022

Priyanjali Jain (born 8 October 1991) is an Indian-born cricketer who plays for the United Arab Emirates women's national cricket team. She is a wicketkeeper batter. She made her Twenty20 International debut against Malaysia women's national cricket team on 22 November 2021.

In October 2022, She was named in UAE's squad for the Women's Twenty20 Asia Cup.
