= 2021 Women's Cricket World Cup Qualifier =

Cricket tournament

- Dates: 21 November – 5 December 2021
- Administrator: International Cricket Council
- Cricket format: List A, One Day International
- Host: Zimbabwe
- Champions: none (called off due to COVID-19)
- Participants: 9
- Matches: 25

The 2021 Women's Cricket World Cup Qualifier was an international women's cricket tournament that was held in Zimbabwe in November and December 2021. The tournament was the final part of the qualification process for the 2022 Women's Cricket World Cup. All of the regional qualification tournaments used the Women's Twenty20 International format. The tournament was the fifth edition of the World Cup Qualifier, with the fixtures played as 50-over matches. Originally, the top three teams from the qualifier would have progressed to the 2022 Women's Cricket World Cup in New Zealand, with those top three teams, along with the next two best-placed teams, also qualifying for the next cycle of the ICC Women's Championship.

Originally, the qualifier was scheduled to take place in Sri Lanka from 3 to 19 July 2020. In March 2020, due to the COVID-19 pandemic, the International Cricket Council (ICC) confirmed that they were reviewing the scheduling of the tournament. On 12 May 2020, the ICC confirmed that the tournament had been postponed. In December 2020, the ICC confirmed that the qualifier would be played during June and July 2021. In April 2021, the ICC postponed the tournament to November and December 2021. In August 2021, the ICC confirmed the dates for the tournament, and that it would be played in Zimbabwe. The full schedule for the tournament was announced in November 2021. The ten teams were placed into two groups of five, with the top three teams from each group advancing to the Super Six stage of the tournament.

On 8 November 2021, Papua New Guinea announced that they had been forced to withdraw due to several players testing positive for COVID-19. On 10 November, the ICC confirmed that there would be no replacement team for Papua New Guinea, with Group A reduced to four teams. In late November 2021, a new variant of the COVID-19 virus was discovered in southern Africa, with Cricket Ireland issuing a statement that they were monitoring the situation. Prior to the discovery of the new variant, three members of the Sri Lankan team had tested positive for COVID-19. Their scheduled match against the West Indies, due to take place on 27 November 2021, was cancelled after seven members of the Sri Lankan team tested positive.

Later the same day, the ICC announced that the qualifier tournament had been called off, due to concerns of the new COVID variant and travel restrictions. Per the ICC's playing conditions, the qualification slots were based on the team's ODI rankings, therefore Bangladesh, Pakistan and the West Indies progressed to the 2022 Women's Cricket World Cup, with Sri Lanka and Ireland qualifying for the next ICC Women's Championship. The decision was criticized by some observers, given that at the point the tournament was abandoned, Thailand (an Associate team) had been leading their group and were already guaranteed a spot in the Super Six stage with two points carried forward, but were not given an opportunity to qualify for the World Cup (or the Women's Championship). As a result, Thailand became the first team since the creation of the qualifiers in 2003 to win at least 3 of their first 4 matches without ultimately qualifying for the World Cup.

== Status of matches ==
In September 2018, ICC chief executive Dave Richardson announced that all matches at ICC World Cup Qualifiers would be awarded One Day International (ODI) status. However, in November 2021, the ICC reversed this decision, and determined that any fixture in the Women's World Cup Qualifier featuring a team without ODI status would be recorded as a List-A match. This followed an announcement retrospectively applying first-class and List-A status to women's cricket.

== Qualification ==
The following teams qualified for the tournament:

| Means of Qualification | Date | Host | Berths | Qualified |
Automatic Qualifications
| WODI status | November 2018 | Tournament results | 2 | Bangladesh |
| WODI status | November 2018 | Tournament results | 2 | Ireland |
| 6th–8th in the 2017–2020 ICC Women's Championship | December 2019 | Tournament results | 3 | Pakistan |
| 6th–8th in the 2017–2020 ICC Women's Championship | December 2019 | Tournament results | 3 | Sri Lanka |
| 6th–8th in the 2017–2020 ICC Women's Championship | December 2019 | Tournament results | 3 | West Indies |
Regional Qualifications
| Asia | 18–27 February 2019 | Thailand | 1 | Thailand |
| Africa | 5–12 May 2019 | Zimbabwe | 1 | Zimbabwe |
| East Asia-Pacific | 6–10 May 2019 | Vanuatu | 1 | ~~Papua New Guinea~~ |
| Americas | 17–19 May 2019 | United States | 1 | United States |
| Europe | 26–29 June 2019 | Spain | 1 | Netherlands |
| Total | | | 10 | |

Papua New Guinea withdrew from the qualifier due to positive COVID-19 tests within the squad.

== Squads ==
The following teams and squads were announced for the tournament. Players marked with an * were named as reserves in their respective sides.

| Bangladesh | Ireland | Netherlands | Pakistan | ~~Papua New Guinea~~ |
|---|---|---|---|---|
| Nigar Sultana (c, wk); Rumana Ahmed; Jahanara Alam; Sharmin Akhter; Nahida Akter; Fargana Hoque; Fahima Khatun; Murshida Khatun; Salma Khatun; Khadija Tul Kubra; Sanjida Akter Meghla; Lata Mondal; Ritu Moni; Sobhana Mostary; Nuzhat Tasnia (wk); Fariha Trisna; Suraiya Azmin*; Shamima Sultana* | Laura Delany (c); Georgina Dempsey; Amy Hunter; Shauna Kavanagh (wk); Gaby Lewis; Louise Little; Sophie MacMahon; Jane Maguire; Cara Murray; Leah Paul; Orla Prendergast; Celeste Raack; Eimear Richardson; Rebecca Stokell; Mary Waldron (wk); Alana Dalzell *; Sarah Forbes *; Kate McEvoy * | Heather Siegers (c); Gwen Bloemen; Marloes Braat; Sterre Kalis; Hannah Landheer; Babette de Leede (wk); Caroline de Lange; Eva Lynch; Frederique Overdijk; Juliët Post; Robine Rijke; Silver Siegers; Jolien van Vliet; Isabel van der Woning; Iris Zwilling | Javeria Khan (c); Muneeba Ali (wk); Sidra Ameen; Anam Amin; Diana Baig; Nida Dar; Kainat Imtiaz; Sadia Iqbal; Iram Javed; Sidra Nawaz (wk); Aliya Riaz; Fatima Sana; Nashra Sandhu; Omaima Sohail; Ayesha Zafar; Aiman Anwer *; Rameen Shamim *; Maham Tariq * | Melani Ani; Vicky Araa; Kaia Arua; Hollan Doriga; Kevau Frank; Veru Frank; Sibona Jimmy; Ravina Oa; Tanya Ruma; Pauke Siaka; Brenda Tau; Mairi Tom; Isabel Toua; Henao Thomas; Naoani Vare |
| Sri Lanka | Thailand | United States | West Indies | Zimbabwe |
| Chamari Athapaththu (c); Harshitha Samarawickrama (vc); Nilakshi de Silva; Kavisha Dilhari; Imesha Dulani; Vishmi Gunaratne; Ama Kanchana; Achini Kulasuriya; Sugandika Kumari; Sachini Nisansala; Hasini Perera; Udeshika Prabodhani; Oshadi Ranasinghe; Inoka Ranaweera; Anushka Sanjeewani; Tharika Sewwandi; Prasadani Weerakkody; Lihini Apsara*; Kawya Kavindi*; Madushika Methtananda*; Sathya Sandeepani*; Umesha Thimashini* | Naruemol Chaiwai (c); Nannapat Koncharoenkai (vc, wk); Nattaya Boochatham; Kanyakorn Bunthansen; Nannaphat Chaihan; Natthakan Chantam; Onnicha Kamchomphu; Rosenan Kanoh; Suleeporn Laomi; Banthida Leephatthana (wk); Wongpaka Liengprasert; Phannita Maya; Thipatcha Putthawong; Chanida Sutthiruang; Sornnarin Tippoch | Sindhu Sriharsha (c); Shebani Bhaskar (vc); Gargi Bhogle; Moksha Chaudhary; Sara Farooq; Uzma Iftikhar; Mahika Kandanala; Geetika Kodali; Anika Kolan; Tara Norris; Chetnaa Prasad; Lisa Ramjit; Akshatha Rao; Suhani Thadani; Isani Vaghela | Stafanie Taylor (c); Anisa Mohammed (vc); Aaliyah Alleyne; Shemaine Campbelle; Shamilia Connell; Deandra Dottin; Sheneta Grimmond; Chinelle Henry; Qiana Joseph; Kycia Knight; Kyshona Knight; Hayley Matthews; Chedean Nation; Shakera Selman; Rashada Williams; Cherry-Ann Fraser*; Shabika Gajnabi*; Karishma Ramharack* | Mary-Anne Musonda (c); Christabel Chatonzwa; Francisca Chipare; Chiedza Dhururu (wk); Nyasha Gwanzura; Precious Marange; Sharne Mayers; Audrey Mazvishaya; Esther Mbofana; Modester Mupachikwa (wk); Nomatter Mutasa; Ashley Ndiraya; Josephine Nkomo; Loryn Phiri; Nomvelo Sibanda; Loreen Tshuma |

== Group stage ==
=== Group A ===
| Pos | Team | Pld | W | L | NR | Pts | NRR |
|---|---|---|---|---|---|---|---|
| 1 | West Indies | 1 | 1 | 0 | 0 | 2 | 0.947 |
| 2 | Sri Lanka | 1 | 1 | 0 | 0 | 2 | 0.779 |
| 3 | Ireland | 2 | 1 | 1 | 0 | 2 | −0.141 |
| 4 | Netherlands | 2 | 0 | 2 | 0 | 0 | −0.673 |

Source: Cricinfo

23 November 2021
09:30
Scorecard

| Ireland; 159 (43 overs) | v | West Indies; 163/4 (39.3 overs) |
| Gaby Lewis 36 (58); Anisa Mohammed 3/40 (10 overs) | | Deandra Dottin 73 (87); Eimear Richardson 2/33 (10 overs) |

West Indies won by 6 wickets
Old Hararians, Harare
Umpires: Christopher Phiri (Zim) and Asif Yaqoob (Pak)
Player of the match: Deandra Dottin (WI)

- West Indies won the toss and elected to field.

23 November 2021
09:30
Scorecard

| Sri Lanka; 278/9 (50 overs) | v | Netherlands; 196/6 (43.4 overs) |
| Chamari Athapaththu 111 (70); Caroline de Lange 4/64 (10 overs) | | Babette de Leede 78 (99); Oshadi Ranasinghe 2/36 (10 overs) |

Sri Lanka won by 34 runs (DLS method)
Harare Sports Club, Harare
Umpires: Forster Mutizwa (Zim) and Rashid Riaz (Pak)

- Netherlands won the toss and elected to field.
- Bad light prevented any further play.

25 November 2021
09:30
Scorecard

| Ireland; 199 (41.5 overs) | v | Netherlands; 170 (48 overs) |
| Laura Delany 75 (75); Silver Siegers 4/24 (7.5 overs) | | Robine Rijke 56 (76); Orla Prendergast 4/24 (8 overs) |

Ireland won by 29 runs
Sunrise Sports Club, Harare
Umpires: Iknow Chabi (Zim) and Shivani Mishra (Qat)
Player of the match: Laura Delany (Ire)

- Netherlands won the toss and elected to field.

27 November 2021
09:30
Scorecard

| Sri Lanka | v | West Indies |

Match cancelled
Harare Sports Club, Harare
Umpires: Lauren Agenbag (SA) and Rashid Riaz (Pak)

- No toss.

29 November 2021
09:30
Scorecard

| Ireland | v | Sri Lanka |

Match cancelled
Harare Sports Club, Harare

29 November 2021
09:30
Scorecard

| Netherlands | v | West Indies |

Match cancelled
Old Hararians, Harare

=== Group B ===
| Pos | Team | Pld | W | L | NR | Pts | NRR |
|---|---|---|---|---|---|---|---|
| 1 | Thailand | 4 | 3 | 1 | 0 | 6 | 0.488 |
| 2 | Bangladesh | 3 | 2 | 1 | 0 | 4 | 1.841 |
| 3 | Pakistan | 3 | 2 | 1 | 0 | 4 | 1.094 |
| 4 | Zimbabwe (H) | 3 | 1 | 2 | 0 | 2 | −0.434 |
| 5 | United States | 3 | 0 | 3 | 0 | 0 | −3.613 |

Source: Cricinfo
(H) Host

21 November 2021
09:30
Scorecard

| Pakistan; 201/7 (50 overs) | v | Bangladesh; 202/7 (49.4 overs) |
| Nida Dar 87 (111); Nahida Akter 2/25 (10 overs) | | Rumana Ahmed 50* (44); Nashra Sandhu 2/24 (10 overs) |

Bangladesh won by 3 wickets
Old Hararians, Harare
Umpires: Narayanan Janani (Ind) and David Odhiambo (Ken)
Player of the match: Rumana Ahmed (Ban)

- Bangladesh won the toss and elected to field.

21 November 2021
09:30
Scorecard

| Thailand; 247/6 (50 overs) | v | Zimbabwe; 239/5 (50 overs) |
| Natthakan Chantam 48 (59); Loreen Tshuma 2/35 (10 overs) | | Mary-Anne Musonda 69* (65); Suleeporn Laomi 2/51 (10 overs) |

Thailand won by 8 runs
Harare Sports Club, Harare
Umpires: Lauren Agenbag (SA) and Buddhi Pradhan (Nep)
Player of the match: Chanida Sutthiruang (Tha)

- Thailand won the toss and elected to bat.
- Naruemol Chaiwai, Natthakan Chantam, Onnicha Kamchomphu, Rosenan Kanoh, Nannapat Koncharoenkai, Suleeporn Laomi, Wongpaka Liengprasert, Thipatcha Putthawong, Chanida Sutthiruang, Sornnarin Tippoch (Tha) and Nomatter Mutasa (Zim) all made their List A debuts.

23 November 2021
09:30
Scorecard

| Bangladesh; 322/5 (50 overs) | v | United States; 52 (30.3 overs) |
| Sharmin Akhter 130* (141); Moksha Chaudhary 2/64 (10 overs) | | Tara Norris 16 (27); Fahima Khatun 2/5 (2.3 overs) |

Bangladesh won by 270 runs
Sunrise Sports Club, Harare
Umpires: Iknow Chabi (Zim) and David Odhiambo (Ken)

- United States won the toss and elected to field.
- Gargi Bhogle, Uzma Iftikhar, Mahika Kandanala, Geetika Kodali, Lisa Ramjit, Sindhu Sriharsha and Isani Vaghela (USA) all made their List A debuts.
- Sharmin Akhter (Ban) scored her first century in List A cricket.

23 November 2021
09:30
Scorecard

| Pakistan; 145 (48 overs) | v | Thailand; 93 (42.5 overs) |
| Aliya Riaz 49 (66); Thipatcha Putthawong 5/18 (9 overs) | | Nattaya Boochatham 18 (51); Fatima Sana 2/8 (3.5 overs) |

Pakistan won by 52 runs
Takashinga Cricket Club, Harare
Umpires: Buddhi Pradhan (Nep) and Langton Rusere (Zim)

- Pakistan won the toss and elected to bat.
- Thipatcha Putthawong (Tha) took her first five-wicket haul in List A cricket.

25 November 2021
09:30
Scorecard

| Bangladesh; 176/8 (50 overs) | v | Thailand; 132/2 (39.2 overs) |
| Fargana Hoque 51 (81); Nattaya Boochatham 5/26 (7 overs) | | Sornnarin Tippoch 69 (113); Nahida Akter 1/17 (7 overs) |

Thailand won by 16 runs (DLS method)
Harare Sports Club, Harare
Umpires: Christopher Phiri (Zim) and Langton Rusere (Zim)
Player of the match: Sornnarin Tippoch (Tha)

- Thailand won the toss and elected to field.
- Bad light prevented any further play.
- Nattaya Boochatham (Tha) took her first five-wicket haul in List A cricket.

25 November 2021
09:30
Scorecard

| United States; 131 (44.5 overs) | v | Zimbabwe; 132/9 (33.3 overs) |
| Sindhu Sriharsha 22 (51); Loreen Tshuma 3/19 (10 overs) | | Sharne Mayers 32 (24); Moksha Chaudhary 4/46 (10 overs) |

Zimbabwe won by 1 wicket
Takashinga Cricket Club, Harare
Umpires: Vrinda Rathi (Ind) and Shiju Sam (UAE)
Player of the match: Loreen Tshuma (Zim)

- Zimbabwe won the toss and elected to field.
- Anika Kolan (USA) made her List A debut.

27 November 2021
09:30
Scorecard

| United States; 93 (42.5 overs) | v | Thailand; 94/1 (17 overs) |
| Lisa Ramjit 26 (64); Nattaya Boochatham 4/16 (10 overs) | | Natthakan Chantham 48 (53); Akshatha Rao 1/26 (4 overs) |

Thailand won by 9 wickets
Old Hararians, Harare
Umpires: Forster Mutizwa (Zim) and Vrinda Rathi (Ind)
Player of the match: Nattaya Boochatham (Tha)

- United States won the toss and elected to bat.
- Phannita Maya (Tha) and Suhani Thadani (USA) both made their List A debuts.

27 November 2021
09:30
Scorecard

| Pakistan; 195/6 (50 overs) | v | Zimbabwe; 81 (26.2 overs) |
| Aliya Riaz 48* (58); Audrey Mazvishaya 1/15 (4 overs) | | Sharne Mayers 18 (16); Sadia Iqbal 3/4 (4 overs) |

Pakistan won by 114 runs
Sunrise Sports Club, Harare
Umpires: Narayanan Janani (Ind) and Shiju Sam (UAE)
Player of the match: Anam Amin (Pak)

- Zimbabwe won the toss and elected to field.

29 November 2021
09:30
Scorecard

| Zimbabwe | v | Bangladesh |

Match cancelled
Old Hararians, Harare

29 November 2021
09:30
Scorecard

| Pakistan | v | United States |

Match cancelled
Harare Sports Club, Harare
