= Anika Kolan =

American cricketer (born 2006)

Personal information
- Born: 18 August 2006 (age 20); Tracy, California, United States
- Batting: Right-handed
- Role: Wicket-keeper

International information
- National side: United States
- ODI debut (cap 6): 11 April 2024 v Papua New Guinea
- Last ODI: 28 October 2024 v Zimbabwe
- T20I debut (cap 18): 18 October 2021 v Brazil
- Last T20I: 3 May 2024 v Sri Lanka

Career statistics
Competition	WT20I	WODI
Matches	22	7
Runs scored	238	155
Batting average	14.87	22.14
100s/50s	0/1	0/0
Top score	54*	43
Catches/stumpings	9/2	0/0
- Source: Cricinfo, 9 November 2024

Anika Reddy Kolan (born 18 August 2006) is an American cricketer who plays for the United States women's national cricket team.

In October 2021, Kolan was named in the American Women's Twenty20 International (WT20I) team for the 2021 ICC Women's T20 World Cup Americas Qualifier tournament in Mexico. She made her WT20I debut on 18 October 2021, in the opening match of the tournament against Brazil. The following month, she was also named in the USA squad for the 2021 Women's Cricket World Cup Qualifier tournament in Harare, Zimbabwe. On 25 November 2021, she played in the USA's second match of the tournament, against Zimbabwe.
