= 2021 Women's T20 World Cup Americas Qualifier =

International cricket tournament

2021 ICC Women's T20 World Cup Americas Qualifier
- Dates: 18 – 25 October 2021
- Administrator: ICC Americas
- Cricket format: Twenty20 International
- Tournament format: Double round-robin
- Host: Mexico
- Champions: United States
- Runners-up: Brazil
- Participants: 4
- Matches: 12
- Player of the series: (Canada) Divya Saxena
- Most runs: (Canada) Divya Saxena (180)
- Most wickets: (Brazil) Laura Cardoso (11)

The 2021 ICC Women's T20 World Cup Americas Qualifier was a cricket tournament played in Mexico in October 2021. The matches were played as Twenty20 International (T20I) fixtures, with the top team progressing to the 2022 ICC Women's T20 World Cup Qualifier tournament. Argentina and Brazil competed in an ICC women's event for the first time since 2012. The tournament's fixtures were confirmed in September 2021. The United States won the tournament, winning five of their six matches.

There was a controversial incident in the first over of the second clash between Canada and the United States when Canadian opener Divya Saxena mishit the first delivery she faced into the air close to the pitch, then ran towards the ball causing the bowler, wicketkeeper and other fielders to fail to take what should have been a simple catch. The umpires took no action despite Saxena breaking Law 37.1 ("Obstructing the field"), and the batter went on to top score with 40 runs in a narrow seven-run win over the Americans. This was the only match that the United States lost in the tournament.

== Squads ==
The following teams and squads were named for the tournament:

Argentina	Brazil	Canada	United States
Veronica Vasquez (c); Tamara Basile; Sofia Bruno; Julieta Cullen; Maria Castiñeiras; Magdalena Esquivel; Albertina Galan; Catalina Greloni; Lucia Iglesias; Mariana Martinez; Malena Lollo; Constanza Sosa; Alison Stocks; Lucia Taylor; Martina Del Valle	Roberta Moretti Avery (c); Laura Agatha; Marianne Artur; Laura Cardoso; Evelyn de Souza (wk); Renata de Sousa; Karina Gonçalves; Lara Moisés; Nicole Monteiro; Alice Nascimento; Erika Ribeiro (wk); Maria Ribeiro; Maria Silva; Daniella Staddon	Kamna Mirchandani (c); Divya Saxena (vc); Hala Azmat; Mukhwinder Gill; Kate Gray; Mahrukh Imtiaz; Krima Kapadia; Miryam Khokhar; Jasmina Oldham; Achini Perera; Hiba Shamshad; Sonali Vig; Sana Zafar; Saniyah Zia	Sindhu Sriharsha (c); Shebani Bhaskar (vc); Gargi Bhogle; Holly Charles; Moksha Chaudhary; Sara Farooq; Uzma Iftikhar; Geetika Kodali; Anika Kolan; Laasya Mullapudi; Tara Norris; Chetnaa Prasad; Akshatha Rao; Suhani Thadani; Isani Vaghela

== Points table ==
Pos	Team	Pld	W	L	NR	Pts	NRR
1	United States	6	5	1	0	10	1.879
2	Brazil	6	4	2	0	8	0.164
3	Canada	6	3	3	0	6	0.652
4	Argentina	6	0	6	0	0	−3.182

Source: ESPNcricinfo

Advanced to the global qualifier

== Fixtures ==
18 October 2021
10:00
Scorecard

Brazil; 63/8 (20 overs)	v	United States; 64/4 (16.1 overs)
Renata de Sousa 13* (55); Tara Norris 2/5 (4 overs)		Sindhu Sriharsha 25* (45); Laura Cardoso 1/6 (2 overs)

United States won by 6 wickets
Reforma Athletic Club, Naucalpan
Umpires: Nigel Duguid (WI) and Jermaine Lindo (USA)
Player of the match: Tara Norris (USA)

- United States won the toss and elected to field.
- Marianne Artur, Laura Cardoso, Evelyn de Souza, Maria Ribeiro, Daniella Staddon (Bra), Gargi Bhogle, Moksha Chaudhary, Anika Kolan, Tara Norris, Suhani Thadani and Isani Vaghela (USA) all made their T20I debuts.

18 October 2021
14:00
Scorecard

Canada; 134/3 (20 overs)	v	Argentina; 62/9 (20 overs)
Divya Saxena 70* (70); Tamara Basile 1/19 (3 overs)		Veronica Vasquez 19 (47); Saniyah Zia 3/9 (4 overs)

Canada won by 72 runs
Reforma Athletic Club, Naucalpan
Umpires: Sameer Bandekar (USA) and Jacqueline Williams (WI)
Player of the match: Divya Saxena (Can)

- Canada won the toss and elected to bat.
- Tamara Basile, Magdalena Esquivel, Catalina Greloni, Lucia Iglesias (Arg), Mukhwinder Gill, Mahrukh Imtiaz, Divya Saxena, Sonali Vig & Sana Zafar (Can) all made their T20I debuts.

19 October 2021
10:00
Scorecard

Argentina; 12 (11.2 overs)	v	Brazil; 13/2 (3.3 overs)
Tamara Basile 2 (8); Renata de Sousa 2/1 (2 overs)		Laura Agatha 4* (13); Tamara Basile 2/6 (1.3 overs)

Brazil won by 8 wickets
Reforma Athletic Club, Naucalpan
Umpires: Sameer Bandekar (USA) and Jermaine Lindo (USA)
Player of the match: Renata de Sousa (Bra)

- Brazil won the toss and elected to field.

19 October 2021
14:00
Scorecard

Canada; 70/9 (20 overs)	v	United States; 71/0 (10.5 overs)
Miryam Khokhar 23 (30); Suhani Thadani 2/7 (4 overs)		Gargi Bhogle 39* (37)

United States won by 10 wickets
Reforma Athletic Club, Naucalpan
Umpires: Nigel Duguid (WI) and Jacqueline Williams (WI)
Player of the match: Gargi Bhogle (USA)

- Canada won the toss and elected to bat.

21 October 2021
10:00
Scorecard

United States; 114 (19.1 overs)	v	Argentina; 58/8 (20 overs)
Shebani Bhaskar 29 (42); Alison Stocks 3/13 (4 overs)		Veronica Vasquez 6 (23); Suhani Thadani 4/6 (4 overs)

United States won by 56 runs
Reforma Athletic Club, Naucalpan
Umpires: Jermaine Lindo (USA) and Jacqueline Williams (WI)
Player of the match: Suhani Thadani (USA)

- Argentina won the toss and elected to field.
- Chetnaa Prasad (USA) made her T20I debut.

21 October 2021
14:00
Scorecard

Canada; 47 (19.5 overs)	v	Brazil; 49/5 (18.1 overs)
Sonali Vig 13 (33); Nicole Monteiro 4/6 (4 overs)		Roberta Moretti Avery 17 (44); Hala Azmat 2/8 (4 overs)

Brazil won by 5 wickets
Reforma Athletic Club, Naucalpan
Umpires: Sameer Bandekar (USA) and Nigel Duguid (WI)
Player of the match: Nicole Monteiro (Bra)

- Brazil won the toss and elected to field.
- Krima Kapadia and Jasmina Oldham (Can) both made their T20I debuts.

22 October 2021
10:00
Scorecard

Argentina; 59/9 (20 overs)	v	Canada; 60/1 (10.4 overs)
Alison Stocks 18* (18); Mukhwinder Gill 2/6 (4 overs)		Divya Saxena 39* (39); Alison Stocks 1/15 (3 overs)

Canada won by 9 wickets
Reforma Athletic Club, Naucalpan
Umpires: Nigel Duguid (WI) and Jermaine Lindo (USA)
Player of the match: Divya Saxena (Can)

- Canada won the toss and elected to field.
- Kate Gray (Can) made her T20I debut.

22 October 2021
14:00
Scorecard

United States; 89/6 (20 overs)	v	Brazil; 46/9 (20 overs)
Gargi Bhogle 26 (40); Laura Cardoso 3/24 (4 overs)		Roberta Moretti Avery 12 (36); Sara Farooq 3/8 (4 overs)

United States won by 43 runs
Reforma Athletic Club, Naucalpan
Umpires: Sameer Bandekar (USA) and Jacqueline Williams (WI)
Player of the match: Sara Farooq (USA)

- United States won the toss and elected to bat.

24 October 2021
10:00
Scorecard

Canada; 85/4 (20 overs)	v	United States; 78/7 (20 overs)
Divya Saxena 40 (45); Akshatha Rao 2/22 (4 overs)		Isani Vaghela 20 (32); Hala Azmat 4/15 (4 overs)

Canada won by 7 runs
Reforma Athletic Club, Naucalpan
Umpires: Sameer Bandekar (USA) and Nigel Duguid (WI)
Player of the match: Hala Azmat (Can)

- United States won the toss and elected to field.
- Laasya Mullapudi (USA) made her T20I debut.

24 October 2021
14:00
Scorecard

Brazil; 79/7 (20 overs)	v	Argentina; 42/3 (15 overs)
Renata de Sousa 14* (29); Constanza Sosa 2/13 (4 overs)		Veronica Vasquez 16* (38); Lara Moisés 2/12 (4 overs)

Brazil won by 14 runs (DLS method)
Reforma Athletic Club, Naucalpan
Umpires: Jermaine Lindo (USA) and Jacqueline Williams (WI)
Player of the match: Lara Moisés (Bra)

- Argentina won the toss and elected to field.
- No further play was possible due to rain.

25 October 2021
10:00
Scorecard

Brazil; 48/7 (17 overs)	v	Canada; 47 (17 overs)
Roberta Moretti Avery 21 (32); Hiba Shamshad 3/8 (4 overs)		Mukhwinder Gill 19 (29); Laura Cardoso 3/8 (3 overs)

Brazil won by 1 run
Reforma Athletic Club, Naucalpan
Umpires: Sameer Bandekar (USA) and Jermaine Lindo (USA)
Player of the match: Renata de Sousa (Bra)

- Canada won the toss and elected to field.
- The match was reduced to 17 overs per side due to rain.
- Laura Cardoso became the first bowler for Brazil to take a hat-trick in women's T20Is.
- Brazil's 2.82 run-per-over rate was the lowest rate successfully defended in a women'sT20I.

25 October 2021
14:00
Scorecard

Argentina; 47 (20 overs)	v	United States; 48/0 (6.3 overs)
Mariana Martinez 10 (31); Moksha Chaudhary 3/7 (4 overs)		Shebani Bhaskar 23* (18)

United States won by 10 wickets
Reforma Athletic Club, Naucalpan
Umpires: Nigel Duguid (WI) and Jacqueline Williams (WI)
Player of the match: Moksha Chaudhary (USA)

- United States won the toss and elected to field.
- Sofia Bruno and Albertina Galan (Arg) both made their T20I debuts.
