= Geetika Kodali =

American cricketer (born 2004)

Personal information
- Full name: Geetika Kodali
- Born: 7 June 2004 (age 22); Fremont, California, United States
- Nickname: Geetu, Geets
- Batting: Right-handed
- Bowling: Right-arm medium

International information
- National side: United States
- ODI debut (cap 5): 11 April 2024 v Papua New Guinea
- Last ODI: 28 October 2024 v Zimbabwe
- T20I debut (cap 13): 19 May 2019 v Canada
- Last T20I: 3 May 2024 v Sri Lanka

Domestic team information
- Years: Team
- 2022: Trinbago Knight Riders

Career statistics
Competition	WT20I	WODI
Matches	22	7
Runs scored	78	46
Batting average	6.50	15.33
100s/50s	0/0	0/0
Top score	20	20
Balls bowled	320	285
Wickets	11	7
Bowling average	27.00	38.42
5 wickets in innings	0	1
10 wickets in match	0	0
Best bowling	2/3	5/43
Catches/stumpings	3/–	1/–
- Source: Cricinfo, 9 November 2024

Geetika Kodali (born 7 June 2004) is an American cricketer. She made her senior international debut in May 2019 at the age of fourteen.

== Biography ==
She started playing cricket at the age of eleven with her friends and relatives. She began to take interest in cricket as her career when she received her formal training at the age of fifteen at the Cricket Zeal Academy in California. She also went onto represent San Ramon Cricket Association and Triangle Cricket League.

== Domestic career ==
In January 2022, she was signed up by South Coast Sapphires for the 2022 FairBreak Invitational T20 which was also the inaugural edition of the tournament.

In 2022, she was bought by the Trinbago Knight Riders as an overseas player for the inaugural edition of The 6ixty which was held in the West Indies. On 25 August 2022, during a group stage match between Trinbago Knight Riders and Barbados Royals, she claimed a hat-trick against Barbados Royals to become the first woman to take a hat-trick in The 6ixty competition. She dismissed Hayley Matthews, Britney Cooper and Chloe Tyron to complete the hat-trick and her efforts ensured her side Trinbago Knight Riders secure a 29 run win over Barbados Royals after successfully defending the total of 92.

In August 2022, she was signed as an overseas player for Trinbago Knight Riders for the inaugural edition of the Women's Caribbean Premier League.

== International career ==
She made her Women's Twenty20 International (WT20I) debut for the United States women's cricket team at the age of 14 on 19 May 2019, against Canada, in the 2019 ICC Women's Qualifier Americas tournament.

In August 2019, she was named in United States' squad for the 2019 ICC Women's World Twenty20 Qualifier tournament in Scotland. She played in the United States' final match of the tournament, on 7 September 2019, against Namibia.

In February 2020, she joined the FairBreak XI with the intention of promoting gender equality in sports and featured in some of Fairbreak XI's invitational matches in Australia.

In February 2021, she was named in the Women's National Training Group by the USA Cricket Women's National Selectors ahead of the 2021 Women's Cricket World Cup Qualifier and the 2021 ICC Women's T20 World Cup Americas Qualifier tournaments.

In September 2021, she was named in the United States' squad for the 2021 ICC Women's T20 World Cup Americas Qualifier and was a member of the national side which emerged triumphant during the four team tournament and as a result America qualified to the 2022 ICC Women's T20 World Cup Qualifier. In October 2021, she was named in the American team for the 2021 Women's Cricket World Cup Qualifier tournament in Zimbabwe.

In August 2022, she captained USA women's U-19 side in its historic thumping series win over the West Indies women's U-19 side in a five match T20 series 4-1. In September 2022, she was named in the United States' squad for the 2022 ICC Women's T20 World Cup Qualifier which was held in the United Arab Emirates.

In December 2022, she was appointed as the captain of the USA Under-19 women's national team for the 2023 ICC Under-19 Women's T20 World Cup, which is also set to be the inaugural edition of the ICC Women's Under-19 Cricket World Cup.
