= Suhani Thadani =

American cricketer (born 2006)

Personal information
- Full name: Suhani Rajiv Thadani
- Born: 2 August 2006 (age 20); San Jose, California
- Batting: Right-handed
- Bowling: Right-arm medium
- Role: Bowler

International information
- National side: United States
- Only ODI (cap 9): 11 April 2024 v Papua New Guinea
- T20I debut (cap 20): 18 October 2021 v Brazil
- Last T20I: 1 May 2024 v Thailand

Career statistics
Competition	WT20I	WODI
Matches	19	1
Runs scored	16	6
Batting average	8.00	6.00
100s/50s	0/0	0/0
Top score	10*	6
Balls bowled	295	18
Wickets	15	0
Bowling average	12.93	–
5 wickets in innings	0	0
10 wickets in match	0	0
Best bowling	4/6	–
Catches/stumpings	1/–	0/–
- Source: Cricinfo, 7 October 2024

Suhani Rajiv Thadani (born 2 August 2006) is an American cricketer who plays for the United States women's national cricket team.

In September 2021, Thadani was named in the American Women's Twenty20 International (WT20I) team for the 2021 ICC Women's T20 World Cup Americas Qualifier tournament in Mexico. She made her WT20I debut on 18 October 2021, in the USA's opening match of the tournament, against Brazil. In her second WT20I match, against Canada, she achieved the USA's best bowling performance, with 2/7 off four overs, and in her third match, against Argentina, she both repeated and improved upon that performance, with 4/6.

The following month, Thadani was named in America's squad for the 2021 Women's Cricket World Cup Qualifier tournament in Zimbabwe. On 27 November 2021, she played in America's third match of the tournament, against Thailand.
