= Isani Vaghela =

American cricketer (born 2006)

Personal information
- Born: 7 January 2006 (age 20); Milpitas, California
- Batting: Right-handed
- Bowling: Right-arm medium
- Relatives: Vatsal Vaghela (brother)

International information
- National side: United States
- ODI debut (cap 10): 11 April 2024 v Papua New Guinea
- Last ODI: 26 October 2024 v Zimbabwe
- T20I debut (cap 21): 18 October 2021 v Brazil
- Last T20I: 3 May 2024 v Sri Lanka

Domestic team information
- Years: Team
- 2022: Guyana Amazon Warriors

Career statistics
Competition	WT20I	WODI
Matches	23	6
Runs scored	150	45
Batting average	11.53	9.00
100s/50s	0/0	0/0
Top score	30	20
Balls bowled	300	219
Wickets	21	4
Bowling average	11.33	54.75
5 wickets in innings	0	0
10 wickets in match	0	0
Best bowling	4/7	2/36
Catches/stumpings	3/–	0/–
- Source: Cricinfo, 9 November 2024

Isani Vaghela (born 7 January 2006) is an American cricketer who plays for the United States women's national cricket team. Her brother, Vatsal, also plays international cricket for the United States.

In September 2021, Vaghela was named in the American Women's Twenty20 International (WT20I) team for the 2021 ICC Women's T20 World Cup Americas Qualifier tournament in Mexico. She made her WT20I debut on 18 October 2021, in the opening match of the tournament against Brazil. The following month, she was also named in America's squad for the 2021 Women's Cricket World Cup Qualifier tournament in Zimbabwe. On 23 November 2021, she played in America's first match of the tournament, against Bangladesh.

In August 2022, she was signed as an overseas player for Guyana Amazon Warriors for the inaugural edition of the Women's Caribbean Premier League.

In February 2026, the International Cricket Council (ICC) announced that Vaghela had been suspended from bowling in international cricket for using an illegal bowling action. Match officials reported her to the ICC following the United States' match against Ireland in the 2026 Women's T20 World Cup Qualifier. The ICC announced their decision after reviewing footage from her next match, in the qualifier against Papua New Guinea.
