= Sindhu Sriharsha =

American cricketer (born 1988)

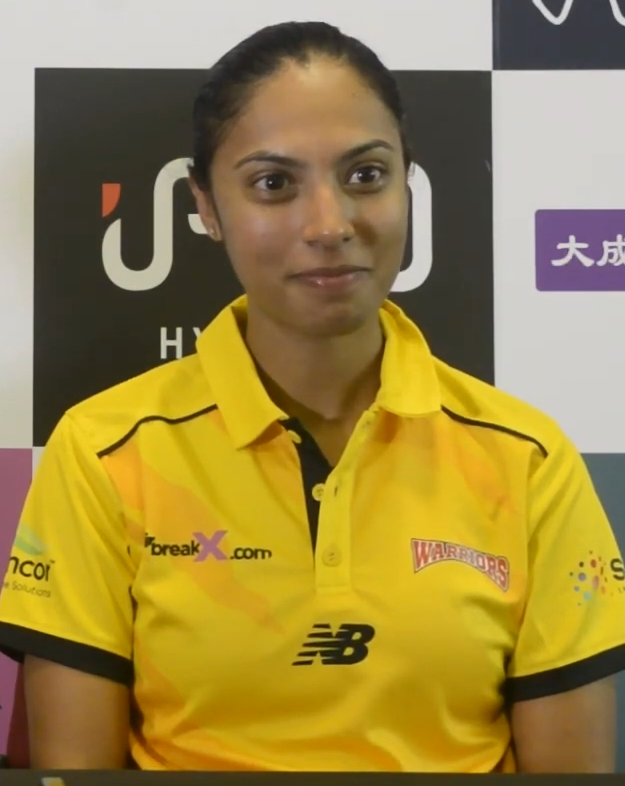
- Sriharsha in 2022

Personal information
- Full name: Sindhu Sriharsha
- Born: 17 August 1988 (age 38); Bangalore, India
- Batting: Right-handed
- Role: Wicket-keeper, Batter

International information
- National side: United States
- ODI debut (cap 8): 11 April 2024 v Papua New Guinea
- Last ODI: 28 October 2024 v Zimbabwe
- T20I debut (cap 10): 17 May 2019 v Canada
- Last T20I: 3 May 2024 v Sri Lanka

Domestic team information
- Years: Team
- 2022–2023: Warriors Women

Career statistics
Competition	WT20I	WODI
Matches	32	7
Runs scored	530	200
Batting average	24.09	50.00
100s/50s	0/3	0/1
Top score	74*	69
Catches/stumpings	19/4	6/2
- Source: Cricinfo, 9 November 2024

Sindhu Sriharsha (born 17 August 1988) is an Indian-born American cricketer and the current captain of the United States women's cricket team.

Born in Bangalore, India, Sriharsha has played cricket formally since the age of nine, after being spotted by former Indian batter Smitha Harikrishna playing the game informally as a seven-year old with the boys of her neighborhood. She has represented the India A and India under-21 teams. In November 2015, she was part of the American squad that played in two Twenty20 matches against the Pakistan women's cricket team, following Pakistan's tour of the West Indies. It was the first time the two teams had played each other in the format.

In May 2019, she was named as the captain of the United States' squad for the 2019 ICC Women's Qualifier Americas tournament in Florida, saying that the team would be "ecstatic" if they won the qualifier. She made her WT20I debut for the United States against Canada in the Americas Qualifier on 17 May 2019. The United States won the Americas qualifier after taking an unassailable 2–0 lead, with wins in their first two matches. Sriharsha finished as the leading run-scorer in the three-match series, with 80 runs. After winning the Americas qualification tournament, Sriharsha said "it's amazing! Going to a global qualifier after eight years is a huge win for USA cricket".

In August 2019, she was named as the captain of the American squad for the 2019 ICC Women's World Twenty20 Qualifier tournament in Scotland. In February 2021, she was named in the Women's National Training Group by the USA Cricket Women's National Selectors ahead of the 2021 Women's Cricket World Cup Qualifier and the 2021 ICC Women's T20 World Cup Americas Qualifier tournaments. In September 2021, she was named as the captain of the American team for the World Cup Qualifier tournament. In October 2021, she was named as the captain of the American team for the 2021 Women's Cricket World Cup Qualifier tournament in Zimbabwe.
