= Gargi Bhogle =

American cricketer (born 2003)

Personal information
- Born: 20 April 2003 (age 23); Mumbai, Maharashtra, India
- Batting: Left-handed
- Bowling: Right-arm Off spin
- Role: Batsman

International information
- National side: United States
- ODI debut (cap 1): 11 April 2024 v Papua New Guinea
- Last ODI: 26 October 2024 v Zimbabwe
- T20I debut (cap 16): 18 October 2021 v Brazil
- Last T20I: 29 April 2024 v Scotland
- Source: ESPNcricinfo, 9 November 2024

Gargi Bhogle (born 20 April 2003) is an American cricketer who plays for the United States women's national cricket team.

In September 2021, Bhogle was named in the American Women's Twenty20 International (WT20I) team for the 2021 ICC Women's T20 World Cup Americas Qualifier tournament in Mexico. She made her WT20I debut on 18 October 2021, in the opening match of the tournament against Brazil. The following month, she was also named in America's squad for the 2021 Women's Cricket World Cup Qualifier tournament in Zimbabwe. On 23 November 2021, she played in America's first match of the tournament, against Bangladesh.
