= Women's One Day International =

Limited overs form of women's cricket

- Highest governing body: International Cricket Council
- Nicknames: WODI
- First played: 20 June 1973

Characteristics
- Team members: Full members, associate members (with WODI status)
- Mixed-sex: No
- Type: Outdoor game
- Equipment: Ball, bat, stumps, cricket helmet, thigh guard, batting pads, abdominal guard, gloves
- Venue: Cricket stadium

Presence
- Country or region: Worldwide

Women's One Day International (WODI) is the limited overs form of women's cricket. Matches are scheduled for 50 overs, equivalent to the men's game. The first women's ODIs were played in 1973, as part of the first Women's World Cup which was held in England. The first ODI would have been between New Zealand and Jamaica on 20 June 1973, but was abandoned without a ball being bowled, due to rain. Therefore, the first women's ODIs to take place were three matches played three days later. The 1,000th women's ODI took place between South Africa and New Zealand on 13 October 2016.

Women's ODI status is determined by the International Cricket Council (ICC) and was restricted to full members of the ICC. In May 2022, the ICC awarded ODI status to five more teams.

== Involved nations ==
In 2006 the ICC announced that only the top-10 ranked sides would have Test and ODI status. Netherlands lost its ODI status due to not finishing in the top 6 placings during the 2011 Women's Cricket World Cup Qualifier. Bangladesh replaced the Netherlands as one of the ten countries with ODI status.

In September 2018, ICC chief executive Dave Richardson announced that all matches at ICC World Cup Qualifiers would be awarded ODI status. However, in November 2021, the ICC reversed this decision and determined that all fixtures in the Women's World Cup Qualifier featuring a team without ODI status would be recorded as a List A match. This followed an announcement retrospectively applying first-class and List A status to women's cricket.

In April 2021, the ICC awarded permanent Test and ODI status to all full member women's teams. Afghanistan and Zimbabwe gained ODI status for the first time as a result of this decision (Afghanistan are yet to play a women's ODI).

The teams with WODI status (with the date of each team's WODI debut) are:

1. Australia (23 June 1973)
2. England (23 June 1973)
3. New Zealand (23 June 1973)
4. India (1 January 1978)
5. West Indies (6 June 1979)
6. Pakistan (28 January 1997)
7. South Africa (5 August 1997)
8. Sri Lanka (25 November 1997)
9. Ireland (5 October 2021)
10. Zimbabwe (5 October 2021)
11. Bangladesh (10 November 2021)
12. Afghanistan (no matches played)

=== Temporary ODI status ===
The ICC grants temporary ODI status to additional teams representing Associate members. In May 2022, the ICC awarded women's ODI status to the Netherlands, Papua New Guinea, Scotland, Thailand and the United States; all of these nations other than Scotland had qualified for the abandoned 2021 Women's Cricket World Cup Qualifier (although PNG withdrew from the qualifier due to COVID-19).

The following five teams currently (from May 2025) have this status (the dates listed in brackets are of their first ODI match after gaining temporary ODI status):

- Netherlands (from 22 August 2022, until the 2029 Women's Cricket World Cup Qualifier)
- Thailand (from 20 November 2022, until the 2029 Women's Cricket World Cup Qualifier)
- Scotland (from 17 October 2023, until the 2029 Women's Cricket World Cup Qualifier)
- Papua New Guinea (from 24 March 2024, until the 2029 Women's Cricket World Cup Qualifier)
- United Arab Emirates (from 26 September 2025, until the 2029 Women's Cricket World Cup Qualifier)

In 2024, the ICC announced the mechanism for ODI status for the five teams for the 2025-2029 cycle, saying "It will consist of a maximum of two AMs that qualify for the ICC Women’s Cricket World Cup Qualifier 2025 with the remaining slots determined by the ICC T20I team rankings at the time of the annual update."

Additionally, five teams have previously held this temporary ODI status before either being promoted to Test Status or relegated after under-performing at the World Cup Qualifier:

- Netherlands (8 August 1984, until 24 November 2011)
- Ireland (28 June 1987, until 13 June 2018)
- Denmark (19 July 1989, until 21 July 1999)
- Bangladesh (26 November 2011, until 4 November 2019)
- United States (from 11 April 2024, until the 3 May 2025)

=== Special ODI status ===
The ICC can also grant special ODI status to all matches within certain high-profile tournaments, with the result being that the following countries have also participated in full ODIs, with some later gaining temporary or permanent ODI status also fitting into this category:

- Japan (2003 IWCC Trophy)

There are also four other teams which once had ODI status, but either no longer exist or no longer play international cricket. Three appeared only in the 1973 Women's Cricket World Cup.

- International XI (1973–1982)
- Jamaica (1973 only)
- Trinidad and Tobago (1973 only)
- Young England (1973 only)

== Rankings ==
Before October 2018, ICC did not maintain a separate Twenty20 ranking for the women's game, instead aggregating performance over all three forms of the game into one overall women's teams ranking. In January 2018, ICC granted international status to all matches between associate nations and announced plan to launch separate T20I rankings for women. In October 2018 the T20I rankings were launched with separate ODI rankings for Full Members.

ICC Women's ODI Team Rankings
Team	Matches	Points	Rating
Australia	28	4,565	163
England	25	3,204	128
India	30	3,712	124
South Africa	36	3,614	100
New Zealand	23	2,134	93
Sri Lanka	21	1,859	89
Pakistan	23	1,690	73
Bangladesh	21	1,537	73
West Indies	23	1,639	71
Ireland	19	947	50
Scotland	7	294	42
Papua New Guinea	9	110	12
Zimbabwe	19	226	12
United Arab Emirates	8	81	10
Source: ICC Women's ODI Team Rankings, 10 May 2026

== Team statistics ==
Team	Span	Matches	Won	Lost	Tied	NR	% Won
Australia	1973–	358	283	66	2	7	79.05
Bangladesh	2011–	63	17	39	2	5	26.98
Denmark	1989–1999	33	6	27	0	0	18.18
England	1973–	383	227	142	2	12	59.26
India	1978–	304	165	133	2	4	54.27
International XI	1973–1982	18	3	14	0	1	17.64
Ireland	1987–	170	47	116	0	7	27.64
Jamaica	1973	5	1	4	0	0	20.00
Japan	2003	5	0	5	0	0	0.00
Netherlands	1984–	110	20	89	0	1	18.18
New Zealand	1973–	379	186	182	3	8	49.07
Pakistan	1997–	203	59	138	3	3	29.06
Papua New Guinea	2024–	9	1	8	0	0	11.11
Scotland	2001–	11	2	9	0	0	18.18
South Africa	1997–	236	124	97	5	10	52.54
Sri Lanka	1997–	181	60	114	0	7	33.14
Thailand	2022–	9	8	1	0	0	88.89
Trinidad and Tobago	1973	6	2	4	0	0	33.33
United Arab Emirates	2025–	4	2	2	0	0	50.00
United States	2024–2025	9	3	6	0	0	33.33
West Indies	1979–	215	93	110	3	9	43.25
Young England	1973	6	1	5	0	0	16.66
Zimbabwe	2021–	11	1	10	0	0	9.09
Source: Cricinfo, as 24 December 2023. The result percentage excludes no results and counts ties as half a win.

== Records ==
As of May 2024.

=== Batting ===
Record	First		Second		Ref
Most runs	(India) Mithali Raj	7805	(Cricket West Indies) Stafanie Taylor	6004	
Highest average (Min 20 innings)	(England) Rachael Heyhoe-Flint	58.45	(Australia) Lindsay Reeler	57.44	
Highest score	(New Zealand) Amelia Kerr	232*	(Australia) Belinda Clark	229*	
Most centuries	(Australia) Meg Lanning	15	(India) Smriti Mandhana	14	
Most 50s (and over)	(India) Mithali Raj	71	(England) Charlotte Edwards	55	

=== Bowling ===
Record	First		Second		Ref
Most Wickets	(India) Jhulan Goswami	255	(South Africa) Shabnim Ismail	191	
Best Average (min. 1000 balls bowled)	(England) Gill Smith	12.53	(Australia) Lyn Fullston	13.26	
Best Economy rate (min. 1000 balls bowled)	(New Zealand) Sue Brown	1.81	(Australia) Sharon Tredrea	1.86	
Best bowling figures	(Pakistan) Sajjida Shah vs Japan (2003)	7/4	(England) Jo Chamberlain vs Denmark (1991)	7/8	

== See also ==
- Women's Test cricket
- Women's Twenty20 International
- ICC Women's Championship
