= List of United States women Twenty20 International cricketers =

This is a list of United States women Twenty20 International cricketers. A Twenty20 International is an international cricket match between two representative teams. A Twenty20 International is played under the rules of Twenty20 cricket. In April 2018, the International Cricket Council (ICC) granted full international status to Twenty20 women's matches played between member sides from 1 July 2018 onwards. The United States women's team made their Twenty20 International debut on 17 May 2019 against Canada in Lauderhill during the 2019 ICC Women's T20 World Cup Americas Region Qualifier.

The list is arranged in the order in which each player won her first Twenty20 cap. Where more than one player won her first Twenty20 cap in the same match, those players are listed alphabetically by surname.

== Key ==
General

- ‡ – Captain
- † – Wicket-keeper
- First – Year of debut
- Last – Year of latest game
- Mat – Number of matches played

Batting

- Runs – Runs scored in career
- HS – Highest score
- Avg – Runs scored per dismissal
- * – Batsman remained not out
- 50 – Number of half centuries

Bowling

- Wkt – Wickets taken in career
- BBI – Best bowling in an innings
- Ave – Average runs per wicket

Fielding

- Ca – Catches taken
- St – Stumpings affected

== Players ==
Statistics are correct as of 14 November 2026.

United States women T20I cricketers
General					Batting				Bowling				Fielding		Ref
No.	Name	First	Last	Mat	Runs	HS	Avg	50	Balls	Wkt	BBI	Ave	Ca	St	Ref
1	Claudine Beckford	2019	2019	6	0	0	0.00	0	108	6	3/26	14.00	0	0	
2	Shebani Bhaskar†	2019	2021	14	180	30	18.00	0	–	–	–	–	2	0	
3	Sugetha Chandhrasekar	2019	2019	7	76	32	15.20	0	–	–	–	–	1	0	
4	Sara Farooq	2019	2021	13	1	1*	–	0	226	6	3/8	26.00	0	0	
5	Nadia Gruny	2019	2019	8	100	53*	20.00	1	–	–	–	–	2	0	
6	Uzma Iftikhar	2019	2023	14	16	7	4.00	0	270	13	4/19	12.38	0	0	
7	Samantha Ramautar	2019	2019	7	13	5	6.50	0	126	4	2/10	27.25	1	0	
8	Lisa Ramjit	2019	2022	14	137	48*	27.40	0	150	7	3/11	13.28	2	0	
9	Erica Rendler	2019	2019	8	108	47*	15.42	0	–	–	–	–	0	0	
10	Sindhu Sriharsha‡†	2019	2024	32	530	74*	24.09	3	–	–	–	–	19	4	
11	Onika Wallerson	2019	2023	8	32	23	6.40	0	108	2	1/14	44.00	3	0	
12	Candacy Atkins	2019	2019	1	1	1	1.00	0	–	–	–	–	0	0	
13	Geetika Kodali	2019	2026	45	126	20	6.30	0	699	31	3/12	21.83	7	0	
14	Akshatha Rao	2019	2021	9	1	1	1.00	0	144	4	2/2	20.16	1	0	
15	Mahika Kandanala	2019	2022	6	47	23	11.75	0	4	0	–	–	1	0	
16	Gargi Bhogle	2021	2026	34	513	39*	23.31	0	–	–	–	–	9	0	
17	Moksha Chaudhary	2021	2021	6	6	6*	6.00	0	144	7	3/7	10.42	2	0	
18	Anika Kolan‡†	2021	2025	28	338	54*	19.88	1	–	–	–	–	11	7	
19	Tara Norris	2021	2026	17	88	18	11.00	0	336	21	4/33	10.04	3	0	
20	Suhani Thadani	2021	2026	26	17	10*	5.66	0	373	18	4/6	16.83	3	0	
21	Isani Vaghela	2021	2026	54	566	54	15.29	2	511	31	4/7	14.06	14	0	
22	Chetnaa Prasad	2021	2025	6	3	3	1.50	0	66	12	4/5	3.00	1	0	
23	Laasya Mullapudi	2021	2021	1	5	5	5.00	0	–	–	–	–	0	0	
24	Bhumika Bhadriraju	2022	2022	7	6	4	1.50	0	126	8	4/9	13.75	1	0	
25	Taranum Chopra	2022	2026	24	87	20*	12.42	0	341	23	3/11	12.52	11	0	
26	Disha Dhingra	2022	2026	36	595	63*	17.50	4	54	0	–	–	15	0	
27	Prithi Iyengar	2022	2022	2	1	1*	–	0	18	0	–	–	0	0	
28	Snigdha Paul	2022	2022	8	63	26	7.87	0	90	3	1/19	36.66	1	0	
29	Ritu Singh	2022	2026	50	374	41	10.68	0	777	39	4/3	17.79	16	0	
30	Yashaaditi Teki	2022	2022	2	4	4	4.00	0	6	0	–	–	0	0	
31	Sai Tanmayi Eyyunni	2022	2024	6	9	6*	9.00	0	84	3	2/18	26.33	1	0	
32	Aditiba Chudasama‡	2023	2026	45	285	60*	14.25	0	887	46	4/11	16.84	11	0	
33	Chetna Pagydyala	2023	2026	38	662	81*	21.35	2	30	4	3/4	5.00	20	0	
34	Jessica Willathgamuwa	2023	2025	10	38	24	7.60	0	78	1	1/7	96.00	1	0	
35	Jivana Aras	2023	2026	15	41	24*	20.50	0	162	8	3/18	22.00	2	0	
36	Saanvi Immadi	2024	2026	22	11	3	2.75	0	420	9	2/8	40.55	2	0	
37	Pooja Ganesh†	2024	2026	27	326	47	16.30	0	–	–	–	–	10	7	
38	Pooja Shah	2024	2024	1	20	20*	–	0	–	–	–	–	0	0	
39	Ella Claridge†	2025	2026	20	307	70	15.35	1	–	–	–	–	6	19	
40	Maahi Madhavan	2025	2026	19	33	15	11.00	0	312	19	3/23	16.63	4	0	
41	Bhakti Shastri	2025	2025	3	12	6*	6.00	0	–	–	–	–	2	0	
42	Lekha Shetty	2025	2026	14	20	14*	10.00	0	204	12	4/16	18.66	2	0	
43	Mitali Patwardhan	2025	2025	1	1	1	1.00	0	–	–	–	–	1	1	
44	Sainavi Kambalapalli	2026	2026	15	200	52*	14.28	1	330	21	3/9	10.04	4	0	
45	Nikhar Doshi	2026	2026	7	110	29*	22.00	0	–	–	–	–	1	0	
45	Aparna Gurumurthy	2026	2026	1	–	–	–	–	–	–	–	–	0	0	
