= Canada women's national cricket team =

Cricket team

Canada
- Nickname: Maple Leafers
- Association: Cricket Canada

Personnel
- Captain: Saad Bin Zafar
- Coach: Tejinderpal Singh

International Cricket Council
- ICC status: Associate member (1968)
- ICC region: Americas
ICC Rankings	Current	Best-ever
T20I	31st	31st (16-Aug-2025)

One Day Internationals
- First ODI: v Pakistan at Headingley, England; 09 June 1979
- Last ODI: v Oman at Al Amerat Cricket Ground, Oman; 09 October 2026

International cricket
- First international: v Bermuda at Beacon Hill Park, Victoria; 2 September 2006

T20 Internationals
- First T20I: v United States at Central Broward Stadium, Lauderhill; 17 May 2019
- Last T20I: v Argentina at St. George's College Ground, Quilmes; 2 August 2026
T20Is	Played	Won/Lost
Total	37	13/22 (0 ties, 2 no results)
This year	7	1/5 (0 ties, 1 no result)
- T20 World Cup Qualifier appearances: 1 (first in 2013)
- Best result: 7th (2013)
- As of 08 October 2026

The Canada women's national cricket team is the team that represents the country of Canada in international women's cricket matches. The team made its international debut in 2006, although Cricket Canada has been an associate member of the International Cricket Council (ICC) in 1968. Canada is one of the leading associate members in the ICC Americas region. The team is yet to qualify for any ICC global events but did reach the 2013 ICC Women's World Twenty20 Qualifier.

== History ==
Canada made their international debut in September 2006 in a three match series of one-day games against Bermuda to decide which team would represent the Americas region in the Women's Cricket World Cup Qualifier in Ireland in 2007. Canada started well, with a five wicket win in the first win - Game 1, but Bermuda came back with 24 run win in the second - Game 2. The third game went down to the wire, with Bermuda triumphing by just 3 runs - Game 3.

In 2007 Canada won the inaugural ICC Americas Championship held in Toronto, Ontario, Canada. They recorded victories over Argentina and Bermuda. They also played an exhibition game against Trinidad and Tobago under-17s.

In 2009 Canada successfully defended the ICC Americas Championship in Florida, United States, with wins in the T20 portion of the competition over Argentina and Bermuda. Following this, they defeated the United States and had a washout versus Argentina which left them atop the points table.

In 2010 a regional qualifier was held in Toronto Canada between Canada and the United States. Canada lost all three 50 over matches, Game 1, Game 2, Game 3 resulting in the United States qualifying for the World Cup qualifier held in Bangladesh 2011. Canada did however win both T20 games held following the qualifier, Game 1 and Game 2.

In 2012 the ICC Americas T20 Women's Championship was held in the Cayman Islands. Canada registered wins over Brazil, Bermuda, Cayman Islands, and Argentina. The final match versus the United States was a washout, resulting in Canada winning the tournament with a superior net run rate.

In April 2018, the International Cricket Council (ICC) granted full Women's Twenty20 International (WT20I) status to all its members. Therefore, all Twenty20 matches played between Canada women and another international side since 1 July 2018 have the full WT20I status.

In December 2020, the ICC announced the qualification pathway for the 2023 ICC Women's T20 World Cup. Canada were named in the 2021 ICC Women's T20 World Cup Americas Qualifier regional group, alongside three other teams.

== Tournament history ==
=== ICC Women's T20 World Cup Americas Qualifier ===
- 2019: 2nd (DNQ)
- 2021: 3rd (DNQ)
- 2023: 2nd (DNQ)
- 2025: 2nd (DNQ)

=== ICC Women's Americas Championship ===
- 2007: Winner
- 2009: Winner
- 2012: Winner

== Records and statistics ==
International Match Summary — Canada Women

Last updated 2 August 2026

Playing record
Format	M	W	L	T	NR	Inaugural match
Twenty20 Internationals	37	13	22	0	2	17 May 2019

=== Twenty20 International ===
T20I record versus other nations

Records complete to WT20I #2950. Last updated 2 August 2026.

Opponent	M	W	L	T	NR	First match	First win
ICC Associate members
Argentina	13	6	6	0	1	18 October 2021	18 October 2021
Brazil	6	4	2	0	0	21 October 2021	4 September 2023
Tanzania	4	1	2	0	1	4 November 2025	5 November 2025
Uganda	5	0	5	0	0	20 October 2025	
United States	9	2	7	0	0	17 May 2019	24 October 2021

== See also ==
- List of Canada women Twenty20 International cricketers
- Canada national cricket team
