= United States women's national cricket team =

Cricket team

United States
- Flag of the United States
- Association: USA Cricket

Personnel
- Captain: Aditiba Chudasama
- Coach: Hilton Moreeng

International Cricket Council
- ICC status: Associate member (1965)
- ICC region: Americas
ICC Rankings	Current	Best-ever
T20I	19th	19th (24 July, 2026)

International cricket
- First international: v. Brazil at Brian Piccolo Park, Fort Lauderdale; May 18, 2009

One Day Internationals
- First ODI: v. Papua New Guinea at ICC Academy Ground, Dubai; April 11, 2024
- Last ODI: v. Zimbabwe at Grand Prairie Stadium, Dallas; May 3, 2025
ODIs	Played	Won/Lost
Total	9	3/6 (0 ties, 0 no results)
- Women's World Cup Qualifier appearances: 2 (first in 2011)
- Best result: 8th (2011)

T20 Internationals
- First T20I: v. Canada at Central Broward Stadium, Lauderhill; May 17, 2019
- Last T20I: v. Namibia at Entebbe Cricket Oval, Entebbe; November 14, 2026
T20Is	Played	Won/Lost
Total	67	33/33 (0 ties, 1 no result)
This year	22	11/10 (0 ties, 1 no result)
- T20 World Cup Qualifier appearances: 4 (first in 2019)
- Best result: 5th (2026)
ODI & T20I kit
- As of November 14, 2026

The United States women's cricket team represents the United States in international women's cricket matches. Although the United States has been an associate member of the International Cricket Council (ICC) since 1965, the team made its international debut in 2009. The United States is one of the leading associate teams in the ICC Americas region and has participated in two editions of the Women's Cricket World Cup Qualifier and two editions of the ICC Women's T20 World Cup Qualifier, although it is yet to qualify for any World Cups.

== History ==
A national women's program was initiated in 2008. The U.S. women's team made its international debut against Brazil at the 2009 Americas Women's Championship, which it hosted in Fort Lauderdale; former West Indies international Roselyn Emmanuel was the team's inaugural captain. In 2010, the team defeated Canada in a three-match series to represent the Americas region at the 2011 Women's Cricket World Cup Qualifier. The team finished fourth in its group at the Qualifier with only one win – a one-run victory against Zimbabwe.

The early years of the women's national team were marked by conflict with the sport's governing body, the United States of America Cricket Association (USACA). In the lead-up to the 2011 World Cup Qualifier, it was reported that USACA had been reprimanded by the ICC over its lack of support for the women's team and failure to meet administrative deadlines for the tournament. Thirteen players also threatened to withdraw from the national squad over gender inequality in tour stipends. In 2012, it was reported that the team's national coach Robin Singh had made sexist remarks disparaging the players' ability and stating that he had had to "drop [his] mental standards" in order to coach them. USACA failed to hold any national women's events from 2011 to 2016, when the ICC intervened to establish a national combine.

In April 2018, the International Cricket Council (ICC) granted full Women's Twenty20 International (WT20I) status to all its members. Therefore, all Twenty20 matches played between the United States women and another international side after July 1, 2018 will be a full WT20I.

In March 2019, Julia Price was appointed as the head coach of the team. Price had previously played international cricket for Australia. Price stepped down from the role in May 2022, and was succeeded by Shivnarine Chanderpaul in July 2022 as women's senior and U-19 coach.

In December 2020, the ICC announced the qualification pathway for the 2023 ICC Women's T20 World Cup. The United States were named in the 2021 ICC Women's T20 World Cup Americas Qualifier regional group, alongside three other teams.

In May 2022, the ICC announced the United States as one of five women's sides to gain Women's One Day International (ODI) status. Netherlands, Papua New Guinea, Scotland and Thailand are the other four teams.

In May 2025, USA lost their ODI status when they finished outside the top 16 in the annual T20I rankings. They are placed in 24th.

== Tournament history ==
=== ICC Women's T20 World Cup ===
ICC Women's T20 World Cup records
Year	Round	Position	GP	W	L	T	NR
(England) 2009	Did not qualify						
(Cricket West Indies) 2010	Did not qualify						
(Sri Lanka) 2012	Did not qualify						
(Bangladesh) 2014	Did not qualify						
(India) 2016	Did not qualify						
(Cricket West Indies) 2018	Did not qualify						
(Australia) 2020	Did not qualify						
(South Africa) 2023	Did not qualify						
(United Arab Emirates) 2024	Did not qualify						
(England) 2026	Did not qualify						
Total	0/9	0 Titles	0	0	0	0	0

=== ICC Women's T20 World Cup Qualifiers ===
Women's T20 World Cup Qualifier records
Year	Round	Position	GP	W	L	T	NR
(Republic of Ireland) 2013	Did not qualify						
(Thailand) 2015	Did not qualify						
(Netherlands) 2018	Did not qualify						
(Scotland) 2019	Group stage	7/8	3	0	3	0	0
(United Arab Emirates) 2022	Group stage	8/8	4	0	4	0	0
(United Arab Emirates) 2024	Group stage	10/10	4	0	4	0	0
(Nepal) 2026	Super 6	5/10	7	3	4	0	0
Total	4/7	0 Titles	18	3	15	0	0

=== ICC Women's World Cup ===
Women's Cricket World Cup records
Year	Round	Position	GP	W	L	T	NR
(England) 1973	Did not qualify						
(India) 1978	Did not qualify						
(New Zealand) 1982	Did not qualify						
(Australia) 1988	Did not qualify						
(England) 1993	Did not qualify						
(India) 1997	Did not qualify						
(New Zealand) 2000	Did not qualify						
(South Africa) 2005	Did not qualify						
(Australia) 2009	Did not qualify						
(India) 2013	Did not qualify						
(England) 2017	Did not qualify						
(New Zealand) 2022	Did not qualify						
(India) 2025	Did not qualify						
Total	0/13	0 Titles	0	0	0	0	0

=== ICC Women's Cricket World Cup qualifiers ===
Women's Cricket World Cup Qualifier records
Year	Round	Position	GP	W	L	T	NR
(South Africa) 2008	Did not participate						
(Bangladesh) 2011	Group stage	8/10	5	1	4	0	0
(Sri Lanka) 2017	Did not qualify						
(Zimbabwe) 2021	Group stage	–	3	0	3	0	0
(Pakistan) 2025	Did not qualify						
Total	2/5	0 Title	8	1	7	0	0

=== ICC Women's T20 World Cup Americas Qualifier ===
ICC Women's T20 World Cup Americas Qualifier records
Year	Round	Position	GP	W	L	T	NR
(United States) 2019	Champion	1/2	3	3	0	0	0
(Mexico) 2021	Champion	1/4	6	5	1	0	0
(Canada) 2023	Champion	1/4	6	6	0	0	0
(Argentina) 2025	Champion	1/4	6	5	1	0	0
Total	4/4	4 Title	21	19	2	0	0

=== Cricket at Summer Olympics Games ===
Cricket at Summer Olympics records
Host Year	Round	Position	GP	W	L	T	NR
(United States) 2028	To be determined						
(Australia) 2032	To be determined						
Total	–	0 Title	0	0	0	0	0

=== ICC Women's T20 Champions Trophy ===
ICC Women's T20 Champions Trophy records
Host Year	Round	Position	GP	W	L	T	NR
(India) 2027	To be determined						
2031	To be determined						
Total	–	0 Title	0	0	0	0	0

== Current Squad ==
Updated as of 3 May 2024

This lists all the players who played for USA in the past 12 months.

Name	Age	Batting style	Bowling style	Format	Notes
Batters
Disha Dhingra	19	Right-handed	Right-arm medium	ODI, T20I	
Gargi Bhogle	23	Left-handed	Right-arm off break	ODI, T20I	
Pooja Shah	20	Right-handed	Right-arm medium	ODI, T20I	
All-rounders
Isani Waghela	20	Right-handed	Right-arm medium	ODI, T20I	
Geetika Kodali	22	Right-handed	Right-arm medium	ODI, T20I	
Ritu Singh	20	Right-handed	Right-arm off break	ODI, T20I	
Jessica Willathgamuwa	25	Left-handed	Left-arm medium	ODI, T20I	
Suhani Thadani	20	Right-handed	Right-arm medium	ODI, T20I	
Wicket-keepers
Sindhu Sriharsha	38	Right-handed		ODI, T20I	Captain
Anika Kolan	20	Right-handed		ODI, T20I	Vice-captain
Pooja Ganesh	18	Right-handed		ODI, T20I	
Spin Bowlers
Aditi Chudasama	20	Right-handed	Right-arm off break	ODI, T20I	
Saanvi Immadi	18	Left-handed	Right-arm leg break	ODI, T20I	
Uzma Iftikhar	39	Right-handed	Right-arm off break	T20I	
Sai Tanmayi Eyyunni	19	Right-handed	Right-arm leg break	ODI, T20I	
Pace Bowler
Jivana Aras	22	Left-handed	Right-arm medium	ODI, T20I	

== Records and statistics ==
International Match Summary — United States Women

Last updated November 14, 2026

Playing Record
Format	M	W	L	T	NR	Inaugural Match
One-Day Internationals	9	3	6	0	0	April 11, 2024
Twenty20 Internationals	67	33	33	0	1	May 17, 2019

=== One-Day International ===
ODI record versus other nations

Records complete to WODI #1461. Last updated May 3, 2025.

Opponent	M	W	L	T	NR	First match	First win
ICC Full members
Zimbabwe	7	3	4	0	0	October 17, 2024	October 23, 2024
ICC Associate members
Papua New Guinea	1	0	1	0	0	April 11, 2024	
Scotland	1	0	1	0	0	April 14, 2024	

=== Twenty20 International ===
- Highest team total: 162/4, v. Vanuatu on April 27, 2026 at Gahanga International Cricket Stadium, Kigali.
- Highest individual score: 81*, Chetna Pagydyala v. Vanuatu on April 21, 2026 at Gahanga B Ground, Kigali.
- Best individual bowling figures: 4/3, Ritu Singh v. Brazil on September 10, 2023 at Woodley Cricket Field, Los Angeles.

Most T20I runs for United States Women

Player	Runs	Average	Career span
Chetna Pagydyala	662	21.35	2023–2026
Disha Dhingra	595	17.50	2022–2026
Isani Vaghela	566	15.29	2021–2026
Sindhu Sriharsha	530	24.09	2019–2024
Gargi Bhogle	513	23.31	2021–2026

Most T20I wickets for United States Women

Player	Wickets	Average	Career span
Aditiba Chudasama	46	16.84	2023–2026
Ritu Singh	39	17.79	2022–2026
Isani Vaghela	31	14.06	2021–2026
Geetika Kodali	31	21.83	2019–2026
Taranum Chopra	23	12.52	2022—2026

T20I record versus other nations

Records complete to WT20I #3069. Last updated November 14, 2026.

Opponent	M	W	L	T	NR	First match	First win
ICC Full members
Bangladesh	3	0	3	0	0	September 1, 2019	
Ireland	2	0	2	0	0	September 19, 2022	
Sri Lanka	1	0	1	0	0	May 3, 2024	
Zimbabwe	4	1	3	0	0	September 10, 2022	April 29, 2025
ICC Associate members
Argentina	6	6	0	0	0	October 21, 2021	October 21, 2021
Brazil	6	6	0	0	0	October 18, 2021	October 18, 2021
Canada	9	7	2	0	0	May 17, 2019	May 17, 2019
Italy	2	2	0	0	0	April 24, 2026	April 24, 2026
Namibia	5	4	1	0	0	September 7, 2019	September 7, 2019
Nepal	2	2	0	0	0	April 18, 2026	April 18, 2026
Netherlands	6	0	6	0	0	September 5, 2019	
Papua New Guinea	3	1	2	0	0	September 3, 2019	January 26, 2026
Rwanda	4	0	3	0	1	April 21, 2026	
Scotland	4	0	4	0	0	August 31, 2019	
Thailand	3	1	2	0	0	September 12, 2022	January 30, 2026
Uganda	3	0	3	0	0	April 27, 2024	
United Arab Emirates	2	1	1	0	0	September 13, 2022	September 13, 2022
Vanuatu	2	2	0	0	0	April 22, 2026	April 22, 2026

== See also ==
- List of United States women ODI cricketers
- List of United States women Twenty20 International cricketers
