= 2023 Nigeria Invitational Women's T20I Tournament =

International cricket tournament

- Dates: 27 March – 2 April 2023
- Administrator: Nigeria Cricket Federation
- Cricket format: Twenty20 International
- Tournament format(s): Round-robin and final
- Host: Nigeria
- Champions: Nigeria (2nd title)
- Runners-up: Rwanda
- Participants: 5
- Matches: 12
- Most runs: (Rwanda) Gisele Ishimwe (128)
- Most wickets: (Rwanda) Henriette Ishimwe (10) (Sierra Leone) Alice Fillie (10) (Sierra Leone) Janet Kowa (10)

The 2023 Nigeria Invitational Women's T20I Tournament was a women's Twenty20 International (T20I) cricket tournament that took place in Nigeria from 27 March to 2 April 2023. The venue for all of the matches was the Tafawa Balewa Square Cricket Oval in Lagos. In the 2022 tournament, Rwanda defeated the hosts Nigeria in the final.

In addition to the 2022 finalists, Ghana and Sierra Leone also returned this year, while Cameroon made their debut in the tournament. Gambia, who competed in 2022, withdrew for personal reasons.

Rwanda finished on top of the round-robin table after defeating Nigeria in the last match. However, Nigeria then defeated Rwanda by 9 runs in the final to win the tournament. Sierra Leone beat Cameroon in the third-place play-off.

== Squads ==
| Cameroon | Ghana | Nigeria | Rwanda | Sierra Leone |
|---|---|---|---|---|
| Michelle Ekani (c, wk); Sonita Akenji; Marguerite Bessala; Maeva Douma; Edwige Guehoada; Elsa Kana; Tchouabo Leslie; Clemence Manidom; Bernadette Mbida; Jeanne Ngono; Sandra Nono; Olive Ranedoumoun; Madaleine Sissako; Brenda Waluma | Rhyda Ofori (c); Rozabel Asumadu (vc); Elizabeth Annor; Ellen Asante; Kate Awuah; Miriam Eshun; Komalpreet Grewal; Jacqueline Kokam; Cynthia Konadu; Emmanuella Nyaaba; Christiana Nyameke; Beatrice Oduro; Rashidatu Salia; Ivy Yeboah (wk) | Blessing Etim (c); Favour Eseigbe (vc); Rukayat Abdulrasak; Adeshola Adekunle; Peculiar Agboya; Sarah Etim (wk); Chinyenum George; Abigail Igbobie (wk); Agatha Obulor; Lucky Piety; Rachael Samson; Esther Sandy; Salome Sunday; Lillian Udeh | Marie Bimenyimana (c); Sifa Ingabire; Alice Ikuzwe; Rosine Irera; Gisele Ishimwe; Henriette Ishimwe; Immaculee Muhawenimana; Belise Murekatete; Josiane Nyirankundineza; Clarisse Uwase; Geovanis Uwase (wk); Merveille Uwase (wk); Sarah Uwera (wk); Margueritte Vumiliya | Fatmata Parkinson (c); Celina Bull; Fatu Conteh (wk); Alice Fillie; Emma Kamara; Fatu Kamara; Zainab Kamara (wk); Isatu Koroma; Janet Kowa; Fatu Pessima; Isha Quee; Hassanatu Sawaneh; Hussainatu Sawanneh; Marie Turay |

== Round-robin ==
=== Points table ===
| Pos | Team | Pld | W | L | NR | Pts | NRR |
|---|---|---|---|---|---|---|---|
| 1 | Rwanda | 4 | 4 | 0 | 0 | 8 | 4.458 |
| 2 | Nigeria | 4 | 3 | 1 | 0 | 6 | 1.424 |
| 3 | Sierra Leone | 4 | 2 | 2 | 0 | 4 | −0.209 |
| 4 | Cameroon | 4 | 1 | 3 | 0 | 2 | −2.345 |
| 5 | Ghana | 4 | 0 | 4 | 0 | 0 | −3.322 |

Source: ESPNcricinfo

Advanced to the final
Advanced to the 3rd place play-off

=== Fixtures ===
27 March 2023
09:30
Scorecard

| Sierra Leone; 65/9 (19 overs) | v | Nigeria; 67/4 (14.1 overs) |
| Zainab Kamara 13 (25); Rukayat Abdulrasak 2/6 (4 overs) | | Lucky Piety 22* (24); Alice Fillie 2/15 (4 overs) |

Nigeria won by 6 wickets
Tafawa Balewa Square Cricket Oval, Lagos
Umpires: Sharon Athuola (Uga) and Gaston Niyibizi (Rwa)
Player of the match: Lucky Piety (Nga)

- Nigeria won the toss and elected to field.
- The match was reduced to 19 overs per side due to rain.
- Celina Bull, Fatu Conteh, Alice Fillie, Emma Kamara, Fatu Kamara, Isha Quee and Hassanatu Sawaneh (Sle) all made their WT20I debuts.

27 March 2023
13:50
Scorecard

| Rwanda; 158/3 (20 overs) | v | Ghana; 41 (16.3 overs) |
| Sarah Uwera 60* (61); Emmanuella Nyaaba 1/26 (4 overs) | | Elizabeth Annor 8 (12); Henriette Ishimwe 4/4 (2.3 overs) |

Rwanda won by 117 runs
Tafawa Balewa Square Cricket Oval, Lagos
Umpires: Olumide Akintokun (Nga) and Deborah Imobighe (Nga)
Player of the match: Henriette Ishimwe (Rwa)

- Ghana won the toss and elected to field.
- Komalpreet Grewal (Gha), Rosine Irera and Geovanis Uwase (Rwa) all made their WT20I debuts.
- Henriette Ishimwe became the first player for Rwanda to take a hat-trick in women's T20Is.

28 March 2023
09:30
Scorecard

| Cameroon; 58 (20 overs) | v | Nigeria; 60/3 (7.4 overs) |
| Madaleine Sissako 15 (26); Favour Eseigbe 3/4 (3 overs) | | Salome Sunday 17* (17); Edwige Guehoada 2/18 (3 overs) |

Nigeria won by 7 wickets
Tafawa Balewa Square Cricket Oval, Lagos
Umpires: Deborah Imobighe (Nga) and Gaston Niyibizi (Rwa)
Player of the match: Favour Eseigbe (Nga)

- Cameroon won the toss and elected to bat.
- Adeshola Adekunle (Nga), Edwige Guehoada, Elsa Kana and Olive Ranedoumoun (Cmr) all made their WT20I debuts.

28 March 2023
13:50
Scorecard

| Ghana; 67 (19.3 overs) | v | Sierra Leone; 68/3 (12.2 overs) |
| Komalpreet Grewal 19* (34); Alice Fillie 3/9 (4 overs) | | Celina Bull 18* (14); Emmanuella Nyaaba 1/15 (2 overs) |

Sierra Leone won by 7 wickets
Tafawa Balewa Square Cricket Oval, Lagos
Umpires: Temitope Onikoyi (Nga) and Marvelous Oyivwi (Nga)
Player of the match: Alice Fillie (Sle)

- Ghana won the toss and elected to bat.
- Hussainatu Sawanneh (Sle) made her WT20I debut.

29 March 2023
09:30
Scorecard

| Sierra Leone; 56 (19.1 overs) | v | Rwanda; 57/5 (9.1 overs) |
| Fatu Pessima 12* (34); Belise Murekatete 4/17 (4 overs) | | Henriette Ishimwe 17 (13); Alice Fillie 3/19 (3.1 overs) |

Rwanda won by 5 wickets
Tafawa Balewa Square Cricket Oval, Lagos
Umpires: Deborah Imobighe (Nga) and Marvelous Oyivwi (Nga)
Player of the match: Belise Murekatete (Rwa)

- Sierra Leone won the toss and elected to bat.

29 March 2023
13:50
Scorecard

| Cameroon; 95/9 (20 overs) | v | Ghana; 56 (12.2 overs) |
| Madaleine Sissako 22 (40); Rashidatu Salia 3/19 (4 overs) | | Komalpreet Grewal 15 (24); Madaleine Sissako 3/14 (4 overs) |

Cameroon won by 39 runs
Tafawa Balewa Square Cricket Oval, Lagos
Umpires: Olumide Akintokun (Nga) and Temitope Onikoyi (Nga)
Player of the match: Madaleine Sissako (Cmr)

- Cameroon won the toss and elected to bat.
- Jacqueline Kokam and Christiana Nyameke (Gha) both made their WT20I debuts.

31 March 2023
09:30
Scorecard

| Nigeria; 120/4 (20 overs) | v | Ghana; 58/8 (20 overs) |
| Salome Sunday 27* (18); Kate Awuah 2/18 (4 overs) | | Rashidatu Salia 20 (29); Rachael Samson 4/18 (4 overs) |

Nigeria won by 62 runs
Tafawa Balewa Square Cricket Oval, Lagos
Umpires: Olumide Akintokun (Nga) and Sharon Athuola (Uga)
Player of the match: Rachael Samson (Nga)

- Ghana won the toss and elected to field.

31 March 2023
13:50
Scorecard

| Rwanda; 155/9 (20 overs) | v | Cameroon; 29 (10.3 overs) |
| Henriette Ishimwe 43 (33); Edwige Guehoada 3/21 (4 overs) | | Marguerite Bessala 6 (4); Henriette Ishimwe 5/6 (2.3 overs) |

Rwanda won by 126 runs
Tafawa Balewa Square Cricket Oval, Lagos
Umpires: Temitope Onikoyi (Nga) and Marvelous Oyivwi (Nga)
Player of the match: Henriette Ishimwe (Rwa)

- Rwanda won the toss and elected to bat.
- Brenda Waluma (Cmr) made her WT20I debut.
- Henriette Ishimwe became the first player for Rwanda to take a five-wicket haul in WT20Is.

1 April 2023
09:30
Scorecard

| Cameroon; 81/9 (20 overs) | v | Sierra Leone; 82/5 (15 overs) |
| Michelle Ekani 14 (20); Emma Kamara 2/3 (1 over) | | Celina Bull 25 (40); Bernadette Mbida 2/17 (4 overs) |

Sierra Leone won by 5 wickets
Tafawa Balewa Square Cricket Oval, Lagos
Umpires: Gaston Niyibizi (Rwa) and Temitope Onikoyi (Nga)
Player of the match: Janet Kowa (Sle)

- Cameroon won the toss and elected to bat.

1 April 2023
13:50
Scorecard

| Rwanda; 100/7 (20 overs) | v | Nigeria; 61 (16.4 overs) |
| Gisele Ishimwe 29 (34); Adeshola Adekunle 3/10 (4 overs) | | Salome Sunday 29 (37); Josiane Nyirankundineza 3/19 (3.4 overs) |

Rwanda won by 39 runs
Tafawa Balewa Square Cricket Oval, Lagos
Umpires: Sharon Athuola (Uga) and Deborah Imobighe (Nga)
Player of the match: Margueritte Vumiliya (Rwa)

- Rwanda won the toss and elected to bat.

== 3rd place play-off ==
2 April 2023
09:30
Scorecard

| Cameroon; 84 (17.2 overs) | v | Sierra Leone; 85/1 (13.2 overs) |
| Bernadette Mbida 33 (36); Janet Kowa 3/14 (4 overs) | | Fatmata Parkinson 30* (44); Olive Ranedoumoun 1/14 (2 overs) |

Sierra Leone won by 9 wickets
Tafawa Balewa Square Cricket Oval, Lagos
Umpires: Sharon Athuola (Uga) and Marvelous Oyivwi (Nga)
Player of the match: Janet Kowa (Sle)

- Sierra Leone won the toss and elected to field.
- Sonita Akenji (Cmr) made her WT20I debut.

== Final ==
2 April 2023
13:50
Scorecard

| Nigeria; 99/4 (20 overs) | v | Rwanda; 90/9 (20 overs) |
| Salome Sunday 48* (58); Josiane Nyirankundineza 1/9 (3 overs) | | Gisele Ishimwe 31 (48); Rachael Samson 3/13 (3 overs) |

Nigeria won by 9 runs
Tafawa Balewa Square Cricket Oval, Lagos
Umpires: Olumide Akintokun (Nga) and Gaston Niyibizi (Rwa)
Player of the match: Salome Sunday (Nga)

- Nigeria won the toss and elected to bat.
