= 2024 Nigeria Invitational Women's T20I Tournament =

International cricket tournament

- Dates: 25 February – 3 March 2024
- Administrator: Nigeria Cricket Federation
- Cricket format: Twenty20 International
- Tournament format: Double round-robin
- Host: Nigeria
- Champions: Tanzania (1st title)
- Runners-up: Nigeria
- Participants: 4
- Matches: 12
- Player of the series: (Tanzania) Perice Kamunya (11)
- Most runs: (Tanzania) Saum Mtae (203)
- Most wickets: (Rwanda) Rosine Irera (11) (Tanzania) Perice Kamunya (11)

The 2024 Nigeria Invitational Women's T20I Tournament was a Twenty20 International (T20I) cricket tournament that took place in Nigeria from 25 February to 3 March 2024. The participating teams were Nigeria, Rwanda, Sierra Leone and Tanzania. Tanzania competed in the tournament for the first time. Nigeria were the defending champions, having defeated Rwanda in the final of the 2023 edition.

All matches were played at the Tafawa Balewa Square Cricket Oval in Lagos. The fourth edition of the tournament provided the Nigerian, Rwandan and Tanzanian teams with preparation for the 2023 Africa Games.

Rwanda won their opening game against tournament favourites Tanzania, while Nigeria also started with a win on the opening day. On day two, Tanzania picked up their first win, defeating Nigeria. Meanwhile, Rwanda secured a second victory after thrashing Sierra Leone by 10 wickets.

At the halfway stage of the tournament, Nigeria, Tanzania were tied on two wins amid one defeat each, after the hosts claimed an important victory against Rwanda. Nigeria and Tanzania maintained momentum with wins in round four.

Tanzania defeated Nigeria for a second time in round five to move clear at the top of the table with only a game against winless Sierra Leone remaining. Tanzania beat Sierra Leone by 92 runs to secure the title. Nigeria defeated Rwanda in the final match of to claim the runner up spot, ahead of their opponents who finished third and Sierra Leone who lost all six of their matches. Perice Kamunya of Tanzania was named player of the tournament.

== Squads ==
Nigeria	Rwanda	Sierra Leone	Tanzania
Blessing Etim (c); Rukayat Abdulrasak; Adeshola Adekunle; Peculiar Agboya; Christabel Chukwuonye; Favour Eseigbe; Sarah Etim (wk); Victory Igbinedion; Abigail Igbobie (wk); Esther Odunayo; Lucky Piety; Rachael Samson; Esther Sandy; Salome Sunday; Lillian Udeh	Marie Bimenyimana (c); Alice Ikuzwe; Flora Irakoze (wk); Gisele Ishimwe; Henriette Ishimwe; Zurufat Ishimwe; Rosine Irera; Immaculee Muhawenimana; Belise Murekatete; Josiane Nyirankundineza; Marie Tumukunde; Sylvia Usabyimana; Clarisse Uwase; Geovanis Uwase (wk); Merveille Uwase (wk)	Fatmata Parkinson (c) (Note: Fatu Pessima and Zainab Kamara captained Sierra Leone in the sixth and eleventh matches of the series, respectively.); Celina Bull; Linda Bull; Alice Fillie; Aminata Kamara; Ann Marie Kamara; Zainab Kamara (wk); Janet Kowa; Jane Newland; Fatu Pessima; Hassanatu Sawaneh; Theresa Tommy; Marie Turay; Ramatu Turay (wk)	Neema Pius (c); Saum Borakambi; Saumu Hussein (wk); Sophia Jerome; Perice Kamunya; Sheila Kizito; Saidat Mbaki (wk); Aisha Mohamed; Saum Mtae; Hudaa Omary; Tabu Omary; Agnes Qwele; Mwanaidi Swedy; Josephine Ulrik; Mwanamvua Ushanga

== Points table ==
Pos	Team	Pld	W	L	NR	Pts	NRR
1	Tanzania	6	5	1	0	10	2.867
2	Nigeria	6	4	2	0	8	0.026
3	Rwanda	6	3	3	0	6	0.740
4	Sierra Leone	6	0	6	0	0	−4.291

Source: ESPNcricinfo

== Fixtures ==
25 February 2024
10:15
Scorecard

Rwanda; 119/4 (20 overs)	v	Tanzania; 86 (16.4 overs)
Merveille Uwase 36 (38); Sophia Jerome 2/10 (4 overs)		Saum Mtae 29 (21); Henriette Ishimwe 3/14 (3 overs)

Rwanda won by 33 runs
Tafawa Balewa Square Cricket Oval, Lagos
Umpires: Olumide Akintokun (Nga) and Habib Enesi (Nga)
Player of the match: Henriette Ishimwe (Rwa)

- Rwanda won the toss and elected to bat.
- Saidat Mbaki (Tan) made her T20I debut.

25 February 2024
14:15
Scorecard

Nigeria; 143/2 (20 overs)	v	Sierra Leone; 83/8 (20 overs)
Favour Eseigbe 47 (49); Zainab Kamara 1/17 (4 overs)		Celina Bull 23 (33); Adeshola Adekunle 3/12 (4 overs)

Nigeria won by 60 runs
Tafawa Balewa Square Cricket Oval, Lagos
Umpires: Veronique Iriho (Rwa) and Ashafa Modupe (Nga)
Player of the match: Favour Eseigbe (Nga)

- Nigeria won the toss and elected to bat.

26 February 2024
10:15
Scorecard

Tanzania; 134/4 (20 overs)	v	Nigeria; 85/8 (20 overs)
Saum Mtae 38 (27); Adeshola Adekunle 2/21 (4 overs)		Blessing Etim 29 (35); Perice Kamunya 4/7 (4 overs)

Tanzania won by 49 runs
Tafawa Balewa Square Cricket Oval, Lagos
Umpires: Olumide Akintokun (Nga) and Temitope Onikoyi (Nga)
Player of the match: Perice Kamunya (Tan)

- Tanzania won the toss and elected to bat.

26 February 2024
14:15
Scorecard

Sierra Leone; 57 (11.5 overs)	v	Rwanda; 58/0 (5.5 overs)
Jane Newland 13 (17); Rosine Irera 4/13 (3.5 overs)		Merveille Uwase 31* (19)

Rwanda won by 10 wickets
Tafawa Balewa Square Cricket Oval, Lagos
Umpires: Olumide Akintokun (Nga) and Ashafa Modupe (Nga)
Player of the match: Rosine Irera (Rwa)

- Sierra Leone won the toss and elected to bat.
- Zurufat Ishimwe (Rwa) and Jane Newland (Sle) both made their T20I debuts.

28 February 2024
10:15
Scorecard

Rwanda; 95/9 (20 overs)	v	Nigeria; 99/5 (19 overs)
Henriette Ishimwe 23* (20); Adeshola Adekunle 4/13 (4 overs)		Favour Eseigbe 36 (54); Marie Tumukunde 2/29 (4 overs)

Nigeria won by 5 wickets
Tafawa Balewa Square Cricket Oval, Lagos
Umpires: Olumide Akintokun (Nga) and Habib Enesi (Nga)
Player of the match: Adeshola Adekunle (Nga)

- Nigeria won the toss and elected to field.

28 February 2024
14:15
Scorecard

Tanzania; 143/8 (20 overs)	v	Sierra Leone; 45 (12.1 overs)
Tabu Omary 33* (27); Zainab Kamara 3/14 (2 overs)		Jane Newland 17 (28); Agnes Qwele 3/8 (3 overs)

Tanzania won by 98 runs
Tafawa Balewa Square Cricket Oval, Lagos
Umpires: Veronique Iriho (Rwa) and Ashafa Modupe (Nga)
Player of the match: Perice Kamunya (Tan)

- Tanzania won the toss and elected to bat.
- Theresa Tommy (Sle) made her T20I debut.

29 February 2024
10:15
Scorecard

Tanzania; 151/5 (20 overs)	v	Rwanda; 78 (18.4 overs)
Hudaa Omary 54* (42); Henriette Ishimwe 2/25 (4 overs)		Merveille Uwase 20 (14); Perice Kamunya 3/21 (4 overs)

Tanzania won by 73 runs
Tafawa Balewa Square Cricket Oval, Lagos
Umpires: Olumide Akintokun (Nga) and Veronique Iriho (Rwa)
Player of the match: Perice Kamunya (Tan)

- Tanzania won the toss and elected to bat.

29 February 2024
14:15
Scorecard

Sierra Leone; 91/9 (20 overs)	v	Nigeria; 92/5 (15 overs)
Celina Bull 26 (34); Lillian Udeh 4/11 (4 overs)		Salome Sunday 35 (26); Ann Marie Kamara 2/20 (4 overs)

Nigeria won by 5 wickets
Tafawa Balewa Square Cricket Oval, Lagos
Umpires: Habib Enesi (Nga) and Temitope Onikoyi (Nga)
Player of the match: Lillian Udeh (Nga)

- Sierra Leone won the toss and elected to bat.

2 March 2024
10:15
Scorecard

Sierra Leone; 43 (16.4 overs)	v	Rwanda; 44/2 (5 overs)
Zainab Kamara 9* (18); Josiane Nyirankundineza 3/8 (4 overs)		Gisele Ishimwe 19* (11); Fatu Pessima 2/6 (1 over)

Rwanda won by 8 wickets
Tafawa Balewa Square Cricket Oval, Lagos
Umpires: Olumide Akintokun (Nga) and Temitope Onikoyi (Nga)
Player of the match: Josiane Nyirankundineza (Rwa)

- Sierra Leone won the toss and elected to bat.
- Sylvia Usabyimana (Rwa) made her T20I debut.

2 March 2024
14:15
Scorecard

Tanzania; 147/4 (20 overs)	v	Nigeria; 82 (19.2 overs)
Hudaa Omary 54* (36); Lucky Piety 2/29 (4 overs)		Esther Sandy 17 (13); Sophia Jerome 4/14 (4 overs)

Tanzania won by 65 runs
Tafawa Balewa Square Cricket Oval, Lagos
Umpires: Habib Enesi (Nga) and Veronique Iriho (Rwa)
Player of the match: Sophia Jerome (Tan)

- Tanzania won the toss and elected to bat.

3 March 2024
10:15
Scorecard

Tanzania; 178/4 (20 overs)	v	Sierra Leone; 86/5 (20 overs)
Saum Mtae 86* (57); Zainab Kamara 1/17 (2 overs)		Ann Marie Kamara 18 (37); Sheila Kizito 1/8 (3 overs)

Tanzania won by 92 runs
Tafawa Balewa Square Cricket Oval, Lagos
Umpires: Olumide Akintokun (Nga) and Temitope Onikoyi (Nga)
Player of the match: Saum Mtae (Tan)

- Tanzania won the toss and elected to bat.

3 March 2024
14:15
Scorecard

Nigeria; 110/8 (20 overs)	v	Rwanda; 90/9 (20 overs)
Lucky Piety 28 (22); Rosine Irera 2/11 (4 overs)		Alice Ikuzwe 24 (34); Christabel Chukwuonye 3/15 (3 overs)

Nigeria won by 20 runs
Tafawa Balewa Square Cricket Oval, Lagos
Umpires: Habib Enesi (Nga) and Veronique Iriho (Rwa)
Player of the match: Peculiar Agboya (Nga)

- Nigeria won the toss and elected to bat.
