= 2022 Nigeria Invitational Women's T20I Tournament =

International cricket tournament

- Dates: 28 March – 3 April 2022
- Administrator: Nigeria Cricket Federation
- Cricket format: Twenty20 International
- Tournament format(s): Round-robin and final
- Host: Nigeria
- Champions: Rwanda (1st title)
- Runners-up: Nigeria
- Participants: 5
- Matches: 12
- Player of the series: (Rwanda) Margueritte Vumiliya
- Most runs: (Rwanda) Gisele Ishimwe (162)
- Most wickets: (Rwanda) Margueritte Vumiliya (12)

The 2022 Nigeria Invitational Women's T20I Tournament was a Twenty20 International (T20I) tournament that was held in Nigeria from 28 March to 3 April 2022. The venue for all of the matches was the Tafawa Balewa Square Cricket Oval in Lagos. Along with the hosts Nigeria, the tournament featured the national teams of Gambia, Ghana, Rwanda and Sierra Leone. Cameroon were also originally scheduled to take part.

Nigeria were the defending champions, having won the inaugural edition in 2019. As the two highest ranked sides in the tournament, Nigeria and Rwanda were seeded in the draw. Originally, Nigeria were placed in Group A with Ghana and Gambia, while Rwanda were placed in Group B with Sierra Leone and Cameroon. However, Cameroon withdrew from the tournament and the format was changed to a round-robin followed by a third place play-off and a final.

Nigeria beat Rwanda by three runs to finish top of the round-robin stage after both sides had won their first three matches. However, the following day, the Rwandans defeated Nigeria by 53 runs in the final to win the tournament.

== Squads ==
Gambia	Ghana	Nigeria	Rwanda	Sierra Leone
Fatou Faye (c); Maimuna Sano (vc); Hawa Badjie; Kumba Bah; Awa Bobb; Fatou Ceesay (wk); Secka Dibba; Tida Kassama; Catherine Mendy; Marie Mendy; Marie Sambou; Sosseh Sano; Fatoumata Singhateh; Haddy Wally (wk)	Rhyda Ofori (c); Rozabel Asumadu (vc); Janet Alaare; Elizabeth Annor; Ellen Asante; Kate Awuah; Fati Bawa (wk); Miriam Eshun; Cynthia Konadu; Emmanuella Nyaaba; Beatrice Oduro; Rashidatu Salia; Felicia Serwaa; Ivy Yeboah (wk)	Blessing Etim (c); Omonye Asika (vc); Kehinde Abdulqadri; Taiwo Abdulqadri; Peculiar Agboya; Mary Desmond; Favour Eseigbe (wk); Abigail Igbobie (wk); Miracle Imimole; Agatha Obulor; Oseyende Omonkhobio; Lucky Piety; Racheal Samson; Salome Sunday; Lillian Udeh	Marie Bimenyimana (c); Sifa Ingabire; Alice Ikuzwe; Flora Irakoze; Gisele Ishimwe; Henriette Ishimwe; Immaculee Muhawenimana; Belise Murekatete; Josiane Nyirankundineza; Cathia Uwamahoro; Merveille Uwase (wk); Sarah Uwera (wk); Antoinette Uwimbabazi; Margueritte Vumiliya	Aminata Kamara (c); Linda Bull (vc); Ann Marie Kamara; Zainab Kamara (wk); Ramatu Kassim; Mabinty King; Isatu Koroma; Janet Kowa; Fatmata Parkinson; Fatu Pessima; Mabinty Sankoh; Mary Sheriff; Nancy Squire; Marie Turay

The Nigeria Cricket Federation invited 36 women to a training camp in Benin City ahead of the tournament. On 10 March 2022, the squad was reduced to 18 players for the final stage of the training camp.

== Round-robin ==
=== Points table ===
Pos	Team	Pld	W	L	NR	Pts	NRR
1	Nigeria	4	4	0	0	8	2.862
2	Rwanda	4	3	1	0	6	2.989
3	Sierra Leone	4	2	2	0	4	0.903
4	Ghana	4	1	3	0	2	−1.495
5	Gambia	4	0	4	0	0	−6.352

Source: ESPNcricinfo

Advanced to the final
Advanced to the 3rd place play-off

=== Fixtures ===
28 March 2022
09:30
Scorecard

Rwanda; 135/9 (20 overs)	v	Ghana; 54 (14.2 overs)
Gisele Ishimwe 37 (29); Miriam Eshun 3/20 (2 overs)		Ellen Asante 12 (19); Margueritte Vumiliya 4/7 (4 overs)

Rwanda won by 81 runs
Tafawa Balewa Square Cricket Oval, Lagos
Umpires: Patric Makumbi (Uga) and Temitope Onikoyi (Nga)
Player of the match: Margueritte Vumiliya (Rwa)

- Ghana won the toss and elected to field.
- Elizabeth Annor, Ellen Asante, Rozabel Asumadu, Kate Awuah, Fati Bawa, Miriam Eshun, Cynthia Konadu, Emmanuella Nyaaba, Rhyda Ofori, Rashidatu Salia and Felicia Serwaa (Gha) all made their T20I debuts.

28 March 2022
13:50
Scorecard

Nigeria; 131/3 (20 overs)	v	Sierra Leone; 90/6 (20 overs)
Salome Sunday 61* (63); Janet Kowa 2/37 (4 overs)		Mabinty King 33 (49); Blessing Etim 2/16 (4 overs)

Nigeria won by 41 runs
Tafawa Balewa Square Cricket Oval, Lagos
Umpires: Taiwo Oladunjoye (Nga) and Isaac Oyieko (Ken)
Player of the match: Blessing Etim (Nga)

- Sierra Leone won the toss and elected to field.
- Lillian Udeh (Nga) made her T20I debut.

29 March 2022
09:30
Scorecard

Gambia; 20 (10.1 overs)	v	Nigeria; 21/0 (1.5 overs)
Awa Bobb 8 (8); Favour Eseigbe 3/7 (3 overs)		Lucky Piety 14* (8)

Nigeria won by 10 wickets
Tafawa Balewa Square Cricket Oval, Lagos
Umpires: Olumide Akintokun (Nga) and Itangishaka Olivier (Rwa)
Player of the match: Lillian Udeh (Nga)

- Gambia won the toss and elected to bat.
- Hawa Badjie, Kumba Bah, Awa Bobb, Fatou Ceesay, Secka Dibba, Fatou Faye, Marie Mendy, Marie Sambou, Maimuna Sano, Fatoumata Singhateh and Haddy Wally (Gam) all made their T20I debuts.

29 March 2022
13:50
Scorecard

Sierra Leone; 136/2 (20 overs)	v	Ghana; 49 (12.5 overs)
Mabinty King 59* (63); Cynthia Konadu 1/22 (4 overs)		Kate Awuah 16 (15); Fatu Pessima 4/14 (4 overs)

Sierra Leone won by 87 runs
Tafawa Balewa Square Cricket Oval, Lagos
Umpires: Deborah Imobighe (Nga) and Patric Makumbi (Uga)
Player of the match: Fatu Pessima (Sle)

- Sierra Leone won the toss and elected to bat.
- Ivy Yeboah (Gha) made her T20I debut.

30 March 2022
09:30
Scorecard

Sierra Leone; 71/8 (20 overs)	v	Rwanda; 72/1 (11.5 overs)
Zainab Kamara 12* (22); Sifa Ingabire 2/14 (4 overs); Immaculee Muhawenimana 2/14 (4 overs)		Gisele Ishimwe 41 (38); Zainab Kamara 1/10 (0.5 overs)

Rwanda won by 9 wickets
Tafawa Balewa Square Cricket Oval, Lagos
Umpires: Deborah Imobighe (Nga) and Patric Makumbi (Uga)
Player of the match: Gisele Ishimwe (Rwa)

- Sierra Leone won the toss and elected to bat.

30 March 2022
13:50
Scorecard

Ghana; 149/6 (20 overs)	v	Gambia; 43 (11 overs)
Felicia Serwaa 28 (28); Sosseh Sano 3/28 (4 overs)		Catherine Mendy 12 (14); Janet Alaare 3/9 (3 overs)

Ghana won by 106 runs
Tafawa Balewa Square Cricket Oval, Lagos
Umpires: Olumide Akintokun (Nga) and Taiwo Oladunjoye (Nga)
Player of the match: Felicia Serwaa (Gha)

- Ghana won the toss and elected to bat.
- Catherine Mendy, Sosseh Sano (Gam), Janet Alaare and Beatrice Oduro (Gha) all made their T20I debuts.

1 April 2022
09:30
Scorecard

Ghana; 58/8 (20 overs)	v	Nigeria; 61/1 (9.5 overs)
Elizabeth Annor 11 (21); Lillian Udeh 3/8 (4 overs)		Kehinde Abdulqadri 34* (36); Beatrice Oduro 1/10 (2 overs)

Nigeria won by 9 wickets
Tafawa Balewa Square Cricket Oval, Lagos
Umpires: Patric Makumbi (Uga) and Isaac Oyieko (Ken)
Player of the match: Lillian Udeh (Nga)

- Ghana won the toss and elected to bat.
- Lillian Udeh (Nga) took her first hat-trick in T20Is.

1 April 2022
13:50
Scorecard

Gambia; 42 (15.5 overs)	v	Rwanda; 43/0 (3.5 overs)
Catherine Mendy 11 (20); Sifa Ingabire 3/9 (4 overs)		Henriette Ishimwe 23* (15)

Rwanda won by 10 wickets
Tafawa Balewa Square Cricket Oval, Lagos
Umpires: Itangishaka Olivier (Rwa) and Temitope Onikoyi (Nga)
Player of the match: Sifa Ingabire (Rwa)

- Gambia won the toss and elected to bat.
- Tida Kassama (Gam) and Merveille Uwase (Rwa) both made their T20I debuts.

2 April 2022
09:30
Scorecard

Sierra Leone; 67/5 (9 overs)	v	Gambia; 14/6 (9 overs)
Mabinty Sankoh 16 (15); Kumba Bah 1/11 (2 overs); Fatoumata Singhateh 1/11 (2 overs)		Fatoumata Singhateh 7 (15); Fatu Pessima 2/3 (2 overs)

Sierra Leone won by 53 runs
Tafawa Balewa Square Cricket Oval, Lagos
Umpires: Olumide Akintokun (Nga) and Itangishaka Olivier (Rwa)
Player of the match: Mabinty Sankoh (Sle)

- Sierra Leone won the toss and elected to bat.
- The match was reduced to 9 overs per side due to rain.

2 April 2022
13:50
Scorecard

Nigeria; 117/6 (20 overs)	v	Rwanda; 114/6 (20 overs)
Salome Sunday 63 (58); Alice Ikuzwe 1/7 (2 overs)		Gisele Ishimwe 53 (48); Lillian Udeh 2/8 (4 overs)

Nigeria won by 3 runs
Tafawa Balewa Square Cricket Oval, Lagos
Umpires: Patric Makumbi (Uga) and Isaac Oyieko (Ken)
Player of the match: Salome Sunday (Nga)

- Nigeria won the toss and elected to bat.
- Peculiar Agboya (Nga) made her T20I debut.

== 3rd place play-off ==
3 April 2022
09:30
Scorecard

Ghana; 90/9 (20 overs)	v	Sierra Leone; 91/0 (13.4 overs)
Rhyda Ofori 24 (20); Fatu Pessima 4/14 (4 overs)		Aminata Kamara 48* (45)

Sierra Leone won by 10 wickets
Tafawa Balewa Square Cricket Oval, Lagos
Umpires: Deborah Imobighe (Nga) and Temitope Onikoyi (Nga)
Player of the match: Fatu Pessima (Sle)

- Ghana won the toss and elected to bat.

== Final ==
3 April 2022
13:50
Scorecard

Rwanda; 129/5 (20 overs)	v	Nigeria; 76 (17.1 overs)
Sarah Uwera 34 (54); Miracle Imimole 2/8 (3 overs)		Favour Eseigbe 25* (46); Margueritte Vumiliya 4/17 (4 overs)

Rwanda won by 53 runs
Tafawa Balewa Square Cricket Oval, Lagos
Umpires: Patric Makumbi (Uga) and Isaac Oyieko (Ken)
Player of the match: Margueritte Vumiliya (Rwa)

- Rwanda won the toss and elected to bat.
