= Nigerian women's cricket team in Rwanda in 2019–20 =

	Rwanda	Nigeria
- Dates: 4 – 7 September 2019
Captains	Sarah Uwera	Samantha Agazuma

Twenty20 International series
- Results: Rwanda won the 5-match series 3–2
Most runs	Cathia Uwamahoro (73)	Blessing Etim (145)
Most wickets	Immaculate Muhawenimana (6)	Salome Sunday (5); Blessing Etim (5)

The Nigeria women's cricket team toured Rwanda in September 2019 to play a five-match Women's Twenty20 International (WT20I) series. The two teams had previously played a five-match series in Abuja, Nigeria in January 2019, with Nigeria winning 3–2. This return tour in September 2019 was Rwanda's turn to host Nigeria.

The matches were played at the Gahanga International Cricket Stadium in Kigali. In a reverse of the previous series between the two sides, Rwanda won the five-match series 3 matches to 2. As in the previous series, Blessing Etim was the highest scorer for Nigeria.

== Squads ==
Rwanda	Nigeria
Sarah Uwera (c) (wk); Diane Dusabemungu; Alice Ikuzwe; Sifa Ingabire; Divine Ishimwe; Gisele Ishimwe; Henriette Ishimwe; Neema Micheline; Immaculate Muhawenimana; Delphine Mukarurangwa; Belise Murekatete; Josiane Nyirankundineza; Cathia Uwamahoro; Margueritte Vumiliya	Samantha Agazuma (c); Kehinde Abdulquadri; Taiwo Abdulquadri; Omonye Asika; Mary Desmond; Favour Eseigbe; Blessing Etim; Fate Fyneface; Blessing Frank; Agatha Obulor; Oyewole Oyronke (wk); Esther Sandy; Rachael Samson; Salome Sunday

== WT20I series ==
=== 1st WT20I ===
4 September 2019
09:30
Scorecard

Nigeria; 77/8 (20 overs)	v	Rwanda; 80/6 (19.4 overs)
Salome Sunday 25 (15); Alice Ikuzwe 2/8 (3 overs)		Alice Ikuzwe 20 (22); Salome Sunday 3/20 (4 overs)

Rwanda won by 4 wickets
Gahanga International Cricket Stadium, Kigali
Umpires: Patric Makumbi (Uga) and Itangishaka Olivier (Rwa)
Player of the match: Alice Ikuzwe (Rwa)

- Rwanda won the toss and elected to field.
- Divine Ishimwe, Neema Micheline (Rwa), Kehinde Abdulquadri and Salome Sunday (Nga) all made their WT20I debuts.

=== 2nd WT20I ===
4 September 2019
13:50
Scorecard

Nigeria; 105/2 (20 overs)	v	Rwanda; 105/6 (20 overs)
Blessing Etim 50* (48); Immaculate Muhawenimana 1/22 (4 overs)		Cathia Uwamahoro 39* (39); Agatha Obulor 2/11 (4 overs)

Match tied
(Rwanda awarded the win)
Gahanga International Cricket Stadium, Kigali
Umpires: Eric Dusabemungu (Rwa) and Itangishaka Olivier (Rwa)
Player of the match: Kehinde Abdulquadri (Nga)

- Rwanda won the toss and elected to field.
- Rwanda were awarded the victory after Nigeria Women refused to play the Super Over.

=== 3rd WT20I ===
6 September 2019
09:30
Scorecard

Nigeria; 112/3 (20 overs)	v	Rwanda; 99/6 (20 overs)
Blessing Etim 45* (39); Divine Ishimwe 1/21 (4 overs)		Sarah Uwera 33 (49); Blessing Etim 2/26 (4 overs)

Nigeria won by 13 runs
Gahanga International Cricket Stadium, Kigali
Umpires: Eric Dusabemungu (Rwa) and Patric Makumbi (Uga)
Player of the match: Blessing Etim (Nga)

- Rwanda won the toss and elected to field.

=== 4th WT20I ===
6 September 2019
13:50
Scorecard

Nigeria; 87/5 (20 overs)	v	Rwanda; 86 (19.3 overs)
Salome Sunday 26 (28); Immaculee Muhawenimana 3/18 (4 overs)		Henriette Ishimwe 44 (45); Blessing Etim 2/11 (4 overs)

Nigeria won by 1 run
Gahanga International Cricket Stadium, Kigali
Umpires: Patric Makumbi (Uga) and Itangishaka Olivier (Rwa)
Player of the match: Favour Eseigbe (Nga)

- Nigeria won the toss and elected to bat.
- Omonye Asika (Nga) made her WT20I debut.

=== 5th WT20I ===
7 September 2019
13:50
Scorecard

Nigeria; 110/4 (20 overs)	v	Rwanda; 111/6 (19.1 overs)
Salome Sunday 45 (47); Immaculate Muhawenimana 2/24 (4 overs)		Alice Ikuzwe 30 (38); Mary Desmond 3/21 (4 overs)

Rwanda won by 4 wickets
Gahanga International Cricket Stadium, Kigali
Umpires: Eric Dusabemungu (Rwa) and Patric Makumbi (Uga)
Player of the match: Salome Sunday (Nga)

- Nigeria won the toss and elected to bat.
- Esther Sandy (Nga) made her WT20I debut.
