= Fanny Utagushimaninde =

Rwandan cricketer (born 2010)

Fanny Utagushimaninde (born 9 August 2010) is a Rwandan cricketer who plays for the Rwanda women's national cricket team. She is a right-handed batter and a wicket-keeper. As of October 2026, she has played in 17 Women's Twenty20 Internationals for Rwanda Women.

== World record ==
Fanny is known for becoming the youngest player, at the age of 15 years and 223 days, to score a century in Women's Twenty20 International cricket. She achieved the record on 20 March 2026 at the Tafewa Balewa Square Oval in Lagos, while playing for Rwanda Women against Ghana Women during the Nigeria Invitational Women's T20I Tournament.

The record was previously held by Prosscovia Alako of Uganda Women, who was aged 16 years and 233 days when she scored a century against Mali Women in June 2019.

== See also ==
- Cathia Uwamahoro
- Rwanda Cricket Association
- Karen Rolton
