= List of Rwanda women Twenty20 International cricketers =

This is a list of Rwanda women Twenty20 International cricketers. A Twenty20 International is an international cricket match between two representative teams. A Twenty20 International is played under the rules of Twenty20 cricket. In April 2018, the International Cricket Council (ICC) granted full international status to Twenty20 women's matches played between member sides from 1 July 2018 onwards.

The list is arranged in the order in which each player won her first Twenty20 cap for Rwanda. Where more than one player won her first Twenty20 cap in the same match, their surnames are listed alphabetically.

== Key ==
General

- ‡ – Captain
- † – Wicket-keeper
- First – Year of debut
- Last – Year of latest game
- Mat – Number of matches played

Batting

- Runs – Runs scored in career
- HS – Highest score
- Avg – Runs scored per dismissal
- * – Batsman remained not out
- 50 – Number of half centuries
- 100 – Centuries scored

Bowling

- Wkt – Wickets taken in career
- BBI – Best bowling in an innings
- Ave – Average runs per wicket

Fielding

- Ca – Catches taken
- St – Stumpings affected

== Players ==
Statistics are correct as of 14 November 2026.

General					Batting					Bowling				Fielding		Ref
No.	Name	First	Last	Mat	Runs	HS	Avg	50	100	Balls	Wkt	BBI	Ave	Ca	St	Ref
1	Marie Bimenyimana‡	2019	2026	136	1,674	114*	17.78	1	1	1,960	121	5/3	11.61	38	0	
2	Diane Dusabemungu	2019	2021	21	206	33	10.84	0	0	186	5	4/4	26.80	1	0	
3	Alice Ikuzwe	2019	2026	120	733	38*	10.47	0	0	1,524	86	5/12	13.96	21	0	
4	Veronique Iriho	2019	2019	14	103	28	8.58	0	0	276	14	3/4	12.85	4	0	
5	Gisele Ishimwe	2019	2026	124	2,135	114*	19.95	4	1	382	17	2/1	19.47	29	0	
6	Henriette Ishimwe	2019	2026	141	1,476	67*	15.70	1	0	2,551	167	5/6	11.36	39	0	
7	Immaculee Muhawenimana	2019	2025	62	19	7	2.37	0	0	1,011	50	4/6	15.30	3	0	
8	Josiane Nyirankundineza	2010	2024	53	25	5*	3.57	0	0	911	45	3/0	15.35	6	0	
9	Cathia Uwamahoro	2019	2024	40	411	44*	15.22	0	0	–	–	–	–	6	0	
10	Sarah Uwera‡†	2019	2025	69	599	60*	11.09	1	0	–	–	–	–	20	8	
11	Margueritte Vumiliya	2019	2023	61	142	17*	8.35	0	0	984	52	4/0	12.67	8	0	
12	Sifa Ingabire	2019	2023	32	149	24	8.27	0	0	362	22	3/3	12.68	6	0	
13	Flora Irakoze‡†	2019	2026	46	148	17*	8.22	0	0	71	4	2/4	11.75	13	9	
14	Antoinette Uwimbabazi	2019	2022	14	75	16	12.50	0	0	–	–	–	–	4	0	
15	Delphine Mukarurangwa	2019	2021	10	69	16	9.85	0	0	–	–	–	–	1	0	
16	Divine Ishimwe	2019	2019	5	1	1*	–	0	0	114	3	1/11	30.66	1	0	
17	Neema Micheline	2019	2019	4	21	10	7.00	0	0	–	–	–	–	0	0	
18	Belise Murekatete	2021	2026	101	278	28	5.91	0	0	1,459	77	4/17	14.90	17	0	
19	Merveille Uwase†	2022	2026	82	897	62*	14.70	2	0	6	0	–	–	32	8	
20	Clarisse Uwase	2022	2026	95	849	59	11.47	1	0	–	–	–	–	14	0	
21	Rosine Irera	2023	2026	93	99	17*	11.00	0	0	1,831	94	4/13	12.53	27	0	
22	Geovanis Uwase†	2023	2026	45	116	14*	5.52	0	0	168	6	3/14	25.00	3	0	
23	Marie Tumukunde	2023	2024	13	27	9	4.50	0	0	129	6	2/12	21.83	1	0	
24	Shakila Niyomuhoza	2023	2026	39	346	52*	13.30	1	0	–	–	–	–	12	0	
25	Zurufat Ishimwe	2024	2024	4	1	1*	–	0	0	12	0	–	–	0	0	
26	Sylvia Usabyimana	2024	2025	16	22	15	4.40	0	0	180	10	3/17	16.40	0	0	
27	Georgette Ingabire	2024	2026	25	143	45	9.53	0	0	12	1	1/14	14.00	5	0	
28	Rosette Shimwamana	2024	2026	36	41	15	6.83	0	0	561	21	2/3	15.80	7	0	
29	Devotha Uwizeye	2024	2024	3	–	–	–	–	–	30	3	2/3	3.00	0	0	
30	Nadine Nzayituriki	2024	2024	2	–	–	–	–	–	12	0	–	–	0	0	
31	Liliane Ufitinema	2024	2024	2	8	8*	–	0	0	–	–	–	–	1	0	
32	Chanceline Umutonni	2024	2024	2	–	–	–	–	–	12	0	–	–	0	0	
33	Fanny Utagushimaninde	2026	2026	24	468	111*	21.27	0	1	–	–	–	–	4	0	
34	Ruth Uwimana	2026	2026	16	3	3*	1.50	0	0	330	21	4/10	11.38	2	0	
35	Grace Mugwaneza	2026	2026	1	–	–	–	–	–	12	1	1/17	17.00	0	0	
