= Rwandan women's cricket team in Nigeria in 2018–19 =

Match details

	Nigeria women	Rwanda women
- Dates: 26 – 29 January 2019
Captains	Blessing Etim	Sarah Uwera

Twenty20 International series
- Results: Nigeria women won the 5-match series 3–2
Most runs	Blessing Etim (70)	Diane Dusabemungu (71)
Most wickets	Taiwo Abdulquadri (8)	Veronique Iriho (9)
- Player of the series: Veronique Iriho (Rwa)

The Rwanda women's cricket team toured Nigeria in January 2019 to play a five-match Women's Twenty20 International (WT20I) series (later referred to as the first edition of the Nigeria Invitational Women's T20I Tournament). These were the first matches with WT20I status to be played by either side after the International Cricket Council announced that all matches played between women's teams of Associate Members after 1 July 2018 would have full T20I status. The venue for all of the matches was the National Stadium in Abuja.

Nigeria won the series 3–2. The tournament provided both teams with some preparation ahead of the 2019 ICC Women's Qualifier Africa, held in Zimbabwe in May 2019.

== WT20I series ==
=== 1st WT20I ===
26 January 2019
09:30
Scorecard

Rwanda; 65 (17.2 overs)	v	Nigeria; 66/6 (18.1 overs)
Veronique Iriho 28 (34); Agatha Obulor 2/10 (2.2 overs)		Fate Fyneface 18 (17); Veronique Iriho 2/13 (4 overs)

Nigeria won by 4 wickets
National Stadium, Abuja
Umpires: Eugene King (Ngr) and Kehinde Olanbiwonnu (Ngr)
Player of the match: Racheal Samson (Ngr)

- Nigeria won the toss and elected to field.
- Taiwo Abdulquadri, Samantha Agazuma, Mary Desmond, Joy Efosa, Favour Eseigbe, Blessing Etim, Blessing Frank, Fate Fyneface, Blessing Nwobodo, Agatha Obulor, Racheal Samson (Ngr), Marie Bimenyimana, Diane Dusabemungu, Alice Ikuzwe, Veronique Iriho, Gisele Ishimwe, Henriette Ishimwe, Immaculee Muhawenimana, Josiane Nyirankundineza, Cathia Uwamahoro, Sarah Uwera and Margueritte Vumiliya (Rwa) all made their WT20I debuts.

=== 2nd WT20I ===
26 January 2019
14:00
Scorecard

Rwanda; 85/7 (20 overs)	v	Nigeria; 86/5 (16.3 overs)
Diane Dusabemungu 20 (33); Rachael Samson 2/13 (4 overs)		Blessing Etim 22 (20); Veronique Iriho 2/8 (4 overs)

Nigeria won by 5 wickets
National Stadium, Abuja
Umpires: Olumide Akintokun (Ngr) and Austin Areghan (Ngr)
Player of the match: Agatha Obulor (Ngr)

- Rwanda won the toss and elected to bat.
- Hannah Ayoka (Ngr) and Sifa Ingabire (Rwa) both made their WT20I debuts.

=== 3rd WT20I ===
28 January 2019
09:30
Scorecard

Rwanda; 60 (16.3 overs)	v	Nigeria; 61/3 (17.4 overs)
Veronique Iriho 16 (22); Agatha Obulor 3/9 (2 overs)		Favour Eseigbe 19* (46); Immaculee Muhawenimana 2/6 (4 overs)

Nigeria won by 7 wickets
National Stadium, Abuja
Umpires: Olumide Akintokun (Ngr) and Eugene King (Ngr)
Player of the match: Taiwo Abdulquadri (Ngr)

- Nigeria won the toss and elected to field.
- Flora Irakoze (Rwa) made her WT20I debut.

=== 4th WT20I ===
28 January 2019
14:00
Scorecard

Nigeria; 79/8 (20 overs)	v	Rwanda; 80/5 (17.1 overs)
Favour Eseigbe 16 (40); Immaculee Muhawenimana 3/6 (4 overs)		Diane Dusabemungu 21 (45); Blessing Etim 2/21 (3 overs)

Rwanda won by 5 wickets
National Stadium, Abuja
Umpires: Austin Areghan (Ngr) and Kehinde Olanbiwonnu (Ngr)
Player of the match: Immaculee Muhawenimana (Rwa)

- Nigeria won the toss and elected to bat.
- Antoinette Uwimbabazi (Rwa) made her WT20I debut.

=== 5th WT20I ===
29 January 2019
09:30
Scorecard

Nigeria; 61 (19.1 overs)	v	Rwanda; 62/3 (15.1 overs)
Blessing Etim 15 (24); Veronique Iriho 3/4 (4 overs)		Sifa Ingabire 19 (40); Taiwo Abdulquadri 1/10 (3 overs)

Rwanda won by 7 wickets
National Stadium, Abuja
Player of the match: Veronique Iriho (Rwa)

- Rwanda won the toss and elected to field.
- Grace Ephraim (Ngr) made her WT20I debut.
