= Henriette Ishimwe =

Rwandan cricketer (born 2003)

Personal information
- Full name: Henriette Therese Ishimwe
- Born: 14 October 2003 (age 23)
- Batting: Right-handed
- Bowling: Right-arm medium
- Role: All-rounder

International information
- National side: Rwanda
- T20I debut (cap 6): 26 January 2019 v Nigeria
- Last T20I: 30 October 2024 v Kenya

Domestic team information
- Years: Team
- Indatwa Hampshire

Career statistics
Competition	WT20I
Matches	93
Runs scored	1,006
Batting average	15.71
100s/50s	0/0
Top score	49*
Balls bowled	1,637
Wickets	112
Bowling average	10.46
5 wickets in innings	2
10 wickets in match	0
Best bowling	5/6
Catches/stumpings	24/0
- Source: Cricinfo, 30 October 2024

Henriette Therese Ishimwe (born 14 October 2003) is a Rwandan cricketing all-rounder who plays for the women's national cricket team as a right-arm medium pace bowler and right handed batter.

== Domestic career ==
At the domestic level, Ishimwe plays for the Indatwa Hampshire Cricket Club.

== International career ==
=== 2019 ===
On 26 June 2019, Ishimwe made her Women's Twenty20 International (WT20I) debuts for Rwanda against Nigeria at the National Stadium, Abuja, Nigeria, in the first match of a bilateral tour of Nigeria. The match was also both teams' first ever WT20I. Ishemwe played in all five matches of the series, including the fourth match, in which Rwanda racked up its first WT20I victory, by five wickets.

Rwanda's and Ishimwe's next WT20Is were during the ICC Women's Qualifier Africa in Harare, Zimbabwe, in May 2019. In Rwanda's first match of that tournament, against Nigeria, Ishimwe top scored with 27 in 21 balls; she was awarded player of the match, which her team won by 37 runs. Three days later, against Mozambique, she again top scored for her team, with 48 in 40 balls; Rwanda won that match by just one wicket with only three balls remaining, and Ishimwe was player of the match for the second time in a row. In Rwanda's fourth match, against Tanzania, she top scored for her team yet again, with 21 runs in 17 balls, and took 2/20, but Tanzania won the match by 38 runs.

In June 2019, Ishimwe took the field for Rwanda in the annual Kwibuka Women's T20 Tournament, in Kigali, Rwanda. Her best performance in that tournament was during Rwanda's match against Tanzania, in which she took 2/25 and was involved in running out two Tanzanian batters, but again Tanzania won the match, this time by 14 runs. In September 2019, Ishimwe played in a bilateral tour of Rwanda by Nigeria. Her best performance in that series was 44 from 45 balls in the fourth match, but although that was the top score for the match, Nigeria emerged as the winner, by just one run.

=== 2021–present ===
Following a lengthy hiatus during the COVID-19 pandemic, Rwanda and Ishimwe resumed their participation in international cricket in June 2021, when Rwanda again hosted the Kwibuka Women's T20 Tournament. On 9 June 2021, in the team's match against Nigeria, Ishimwe starred with 24 in 23 balls and 2/5, and again was presented with the player of the match award. Rwanda won the match by 6 runs. The following day, against Kenya, Ishimwe achieved her best bowling figures of the tournament, with 3/22, but Kenya won the match, by 25 runs. Rwanda finished the tournament in third place, and Ishimwe was named in the team of the tournament.

The second and final tournament contested by Rwanda in 2021 was the ICC Women's T20 World Cup Africa Qualifier, held in Gaborone, Botswana. Ishimwe's best bowling performance in that tournament was on 12 September 2021, in a match against Eswatini in which her figures were 3/2. Rwanda won that match by 185 runs. Two days later, against Botswana, Ishimwe took 2/11, top scored for her team with 19 runs, and was awarded player of the match, which Rwanda won by three wickets. Rwanda finished the tournament in third place in Group A.

In March/April 2022, Rwanda and Ishimwe contested their first tournament for that year, the 2022 Nigeria Invitational Women's T20I Tournament, held in Lagos. Ishimwe's best performance in the tournament was in Rwanda's match against Gambia, in which she top scored with 23*. Rwanda won that match by 10 wickets, and finished second in the tournament.

Meanwhile, in February 2022, Ishimwe was recruited to play in the privately run 2022 FairBreak Invitational T20 in Dubai, United Arab Emirates. She was allocated to the Barmy Army team. In Barmy Army's first match, against Spirit on 5 May 2022, she caused a sensation, by bowling Spirit captain and recent World Cup winner Nicola Carey with her first ball of the tournament, and, later, by participating in a "wily run-out" of Thai player Nattaya Boochatham. The following day, against Falcons, she deflected a caught and bowled chance from another World Cup winner, Danni Wyatt, into another run-out, of the non-striker, Sri Lanka captain Chamari Athapaththu, who had scored an unbeaten century in Falcons' first match.

== See also ==
- List of Rwanda women Twenty20 International cricketers
