= Samantha Agazuma =

Nigerian cricketer

Personal information
- Born: 14 July 1994 (age 32)
- Batting: Right handed
- Role: Batter

International information
- National side: Nigeria
- T20I debut (cap 2): 26 January 2019 v Rwanda
- Last T20I: 11 June 2021 v Namibia

Career statistics
Competition	WT20I
Matches	19
Runs scored	159
Batting average	13.25
100s/50s	0/0
Top score	28*
Catches/stumpings	5/–
- Source: Cricinfo, 11 June 2021

Samantha Agazuma (born 14 July 1994) is a Nigerian cricketer and the current captain of the Nigeria women's cricket team. Agazuma first began to play cricket as a student at Ambrose Alli University.

In January 2019, Agazuma was named in Nigeria's squad for their first ever Women's Twenty20 International (WT20I) matches, against Rwanda. Agazuma made her WT20I debut on 26 January 2019, against Rwanda at the National Stadium in Abuja, but only scored one run. In May 2019, Agazuma was named in Nigeria's squad for the 2019 ICC Women's Qualifier Africa tournament in Zimbabwe. In September 2019, Agazuma was named captain of the Nigerian team for the first time, for the return leg of their bilateral tour against Rwanda, which Rwanda won 3–2. In May 2021, Agazuma was again named as the captain of the Nigerian team, this time for the 2021 Kwibuka Women's T20 Tournament in Rwanda.
