= Cathia Uwamahoro =

Rwandan female cricket player (born 1993)

Cathia
Personal information
- Full name: Cathia Uwamahoro
- Born: 19 May 1993 (age 33)
- Batting: Right-handed
- Bowling: Right-arm medium-fast

International information
- National side: Rwanda
- T20I debut (cap 9): 26 January 2019 v Nigeria
- Last T20I: 26 April 2024 v Botswana

Career statistics
Competition	WT20I
Matches	40
Runs scored	411
Batting average	15.22
100s/50s	0/0
Top score	44*
Catches/stumpings	6/–
- Source: Cricinfo, 8 October 2024

Cathia Uwamahoro (Gisozi, 5 August 1993) is a Rwandan cricketer who is well known for breaking a Guinness world record in 2017 for the longest cricket net session by a woman.

== Biography ==
Cathia Uwamahoro was a basketball player at her time at school, after her compatriot Eric Dusingizimana how she holds 51-hour longest batting record. She became the second Rwanda cricket player to set a world record in the net, She joined Rwanda women's cricket team in the ICC Africa

== Early life and education ==
Cathia was born in Gisozi sector located in Gasabo district of Kigali city, Cathia is the only child from her parents, (father) Mr.Corneille Rudahinyuka who died in the 1994 Genocide against Tutsi and Mrs.Thacienne Umulisa who survived with her.

She attended her Primary level education at Gasave primary school in Gisozi sector and Kivugiza Primary school in Nyamirambo sector. Cathia went to ESA Gikondo for her Ordinary level Education (O'level) and later joined IPR-Nyandungu where she pursued combination of computer science. Uwamahoro enrolled at the University of Kigali for a Bachelor's degree of Information Technology.

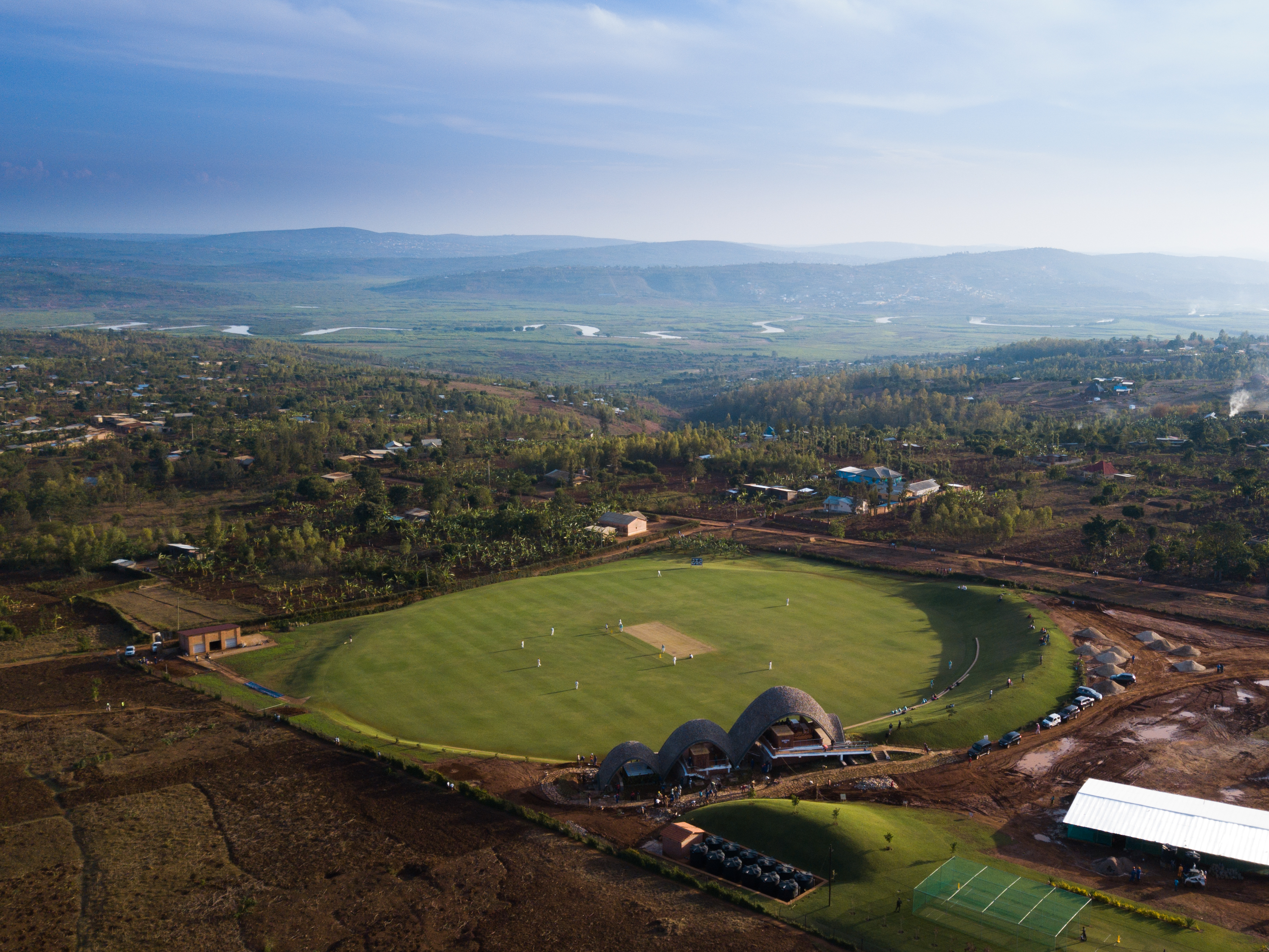
Gahanga Cricket Stadium Drone Shot-YT

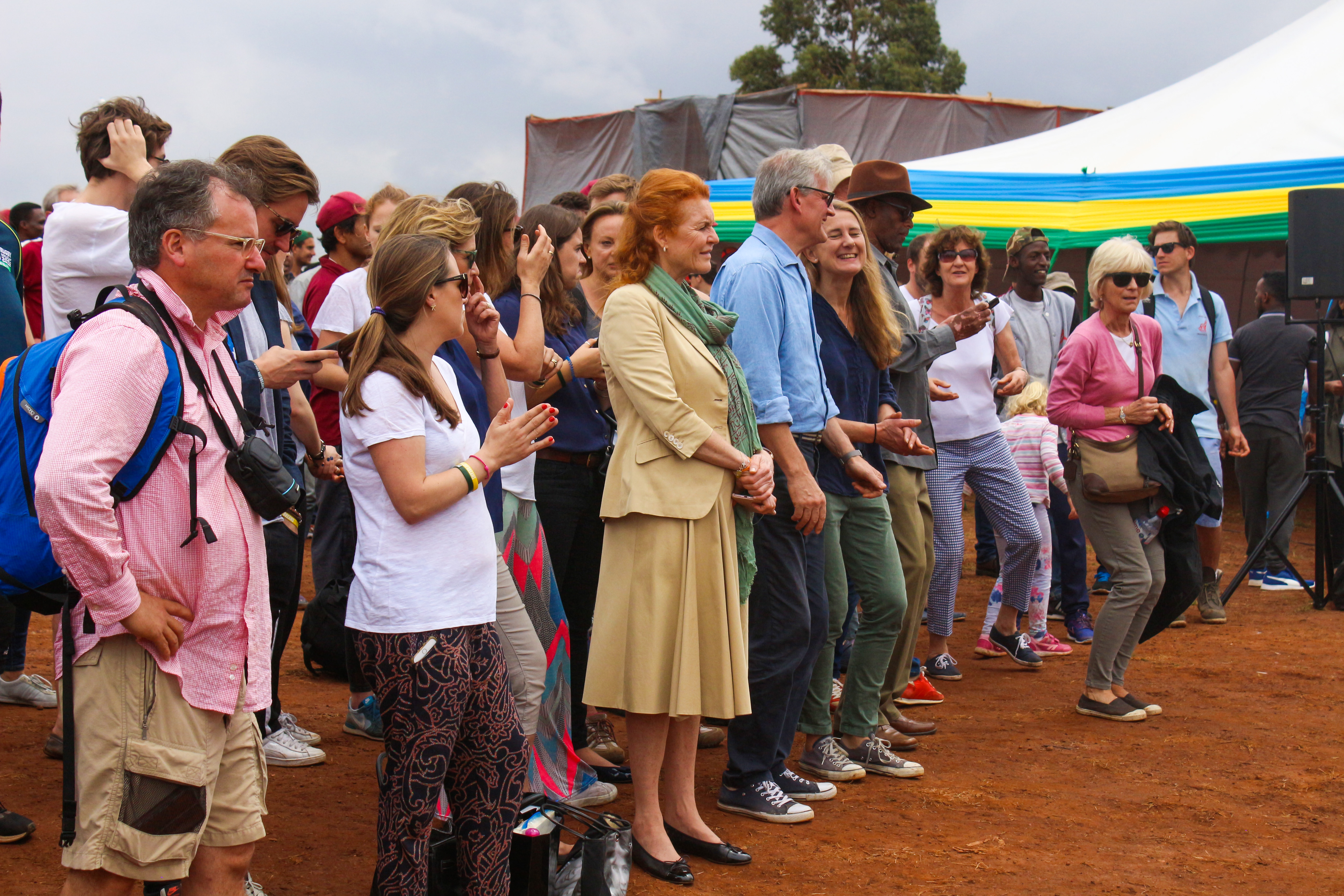
Sarah, Duchess of York, Gahanga cricket stadium 8 (October 2017)

== Career ==
She began her cricket journey in 2008 at the age of 15. After a few months, she was selected for the U19 National women cricket team for the ICC Africa Women's T-20 tournament that took place in Nairobi, Kenya. In 2009, her performance in Kenya and continuous training helped her to get selected for the U19 national team that represented Rwanda in the ICC Africa U19 Women Championship that was held in Dar es Salaam in Tanzania in 2009.
