= Marie Bimenyimana =

Rwandan female cricket player

Personal information
- Full name: Marie Diane Bimenyimana
- Born: 30 November 1996 (age 29)
- Batting: Right-handed
- Bowling: Right-arm medium

International information
- National side: Rwanda
- T20I debut (cap 1): 26 January 2019 v Nigeria
- Last T20I: 6 September 2025 v Kenya

Career statistics
Competition	WT20I
Matches	112
Runs scored	1,504
Batting average	17.90
100s/50s	1/1
Top score	114*
Balls bowled	1,453
Wickets	83
Bowling average	12.08
5 wickets in innings	2
10 wickets in match	0
Best bowling	5/3
Catches/stumpings	31/–
- Source: Cricinfo, 31 December 2025

Marie Bimenyimana (born 30 November 1996) is a Rwandan cricketer and the current captain of the Rwanda women's cricket team. She made her Women's Twenty20 International (WT20I) debut for the Rwanda on 26 January 2019, against Nigeria, in the first WT20I match of Rwanda's tour of Nigeria. It was the first WT20I match to be played by Rwanda.

In May 2019, she was named in Rwanda's squad for the 2019 ICC Women's Qualifier Africa tournament in Zimbabwe. In June 2019, she was named in Rwanda's squad for the 2019 Kwibuka Women's T20 Tournament in Rwanda. On 21 June 2019 she scored 114 not out against Mali, a score which was the first century for Rwanda Women in a WT20I match. In May 2021, she was named in Rwanda's squad for the 2021 Kwibuka Women's T20 Tournament in Rwanda. In August 2021, Bimenyimana replaced Sarah Uwera as the captain of the Rwandan team, ahead of the 2021 ICC Women's T20 World Cup Africa Qualifier tournament. In June 2022 Bimenyimana was again selected to captain of the Rwandan team for the 2022 Kwibuka Women's T20 Tournament. In March 2023 Bimenyimana also selected for team captain Rwanda for the 2023 Nigeria Invitational.
