= Sarah Uwera =

Rwandan cricketer

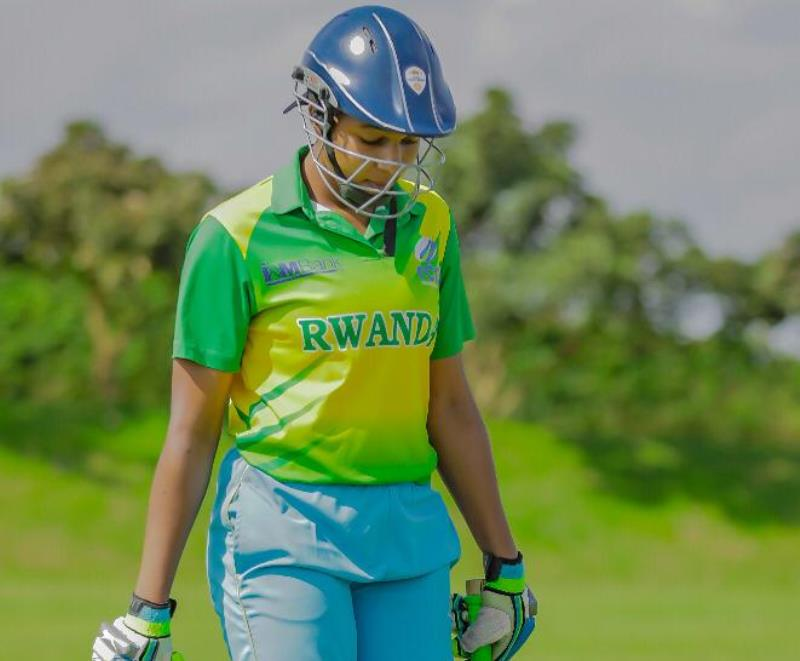
- Sarah Uwera

Personal information
- Born: 1 January 1996 (age 30)
- Batting: Right-handed
- Role: Wicket-keeper

International information
- National side: Rwanda
- T20I debut (cap 10): 26 January 2019 v Nigeria
- Last T20I: 17 June 2023 v Uganda

Career statistics
Competition	WT20I
Matches	60
Runs scored	506
Batting average	11.00
100s/50s	0/1
Top score	60*
Balls bowled	0
Wickets	0
Bowling average	0
5 wickets in innings	0
10 wickets in match	0
Best bowling	0
Catches/stumpings	18/0
- Source: Cricinfo, 17 June 2023

Sarah Uwera (born 1 January 1996) is a Rwandan cricketer and a former captain of the Rwanda women's cricket team. Uwera first began to play cricket in 2012, and also played for Rwanda's under-19 team.

In January 2019, Uwera was named in Rwanda's squad for their first ever Women's Twenty20 International (WT20I) matches, against Nigeria. Uwera made her WT20I debut on 26 January 2019, for Rwanda against Nigeria at the National Stadium in Abuja, but only scored three runs. In May 2019, Uwera was named in Rwanda's squad for the 2019 ICC Women's Qualifier Africa tournament in Zimbabwe. In September 2019, Uwera was named captain of the Rwandan team, for the return leg of their bilateral tour against Nigeria. In May 2021, Uwera was again named as the captain of the national team, this time for the 2021 Kwibuka Women's T20 Tournament in Rwanda. Uwera said she was happy to be part of the tournament and that the team was in good spirits. In August 2021, Marie Bimenyimana replaced Uwera as the captain of the Rwandan team ahead of the 2021 ICC Women's T20 World Cup Africa Qualifier tournament.
