= Tafawa Balewa Square =

Ceremonial ground in Lagos, Nigeria

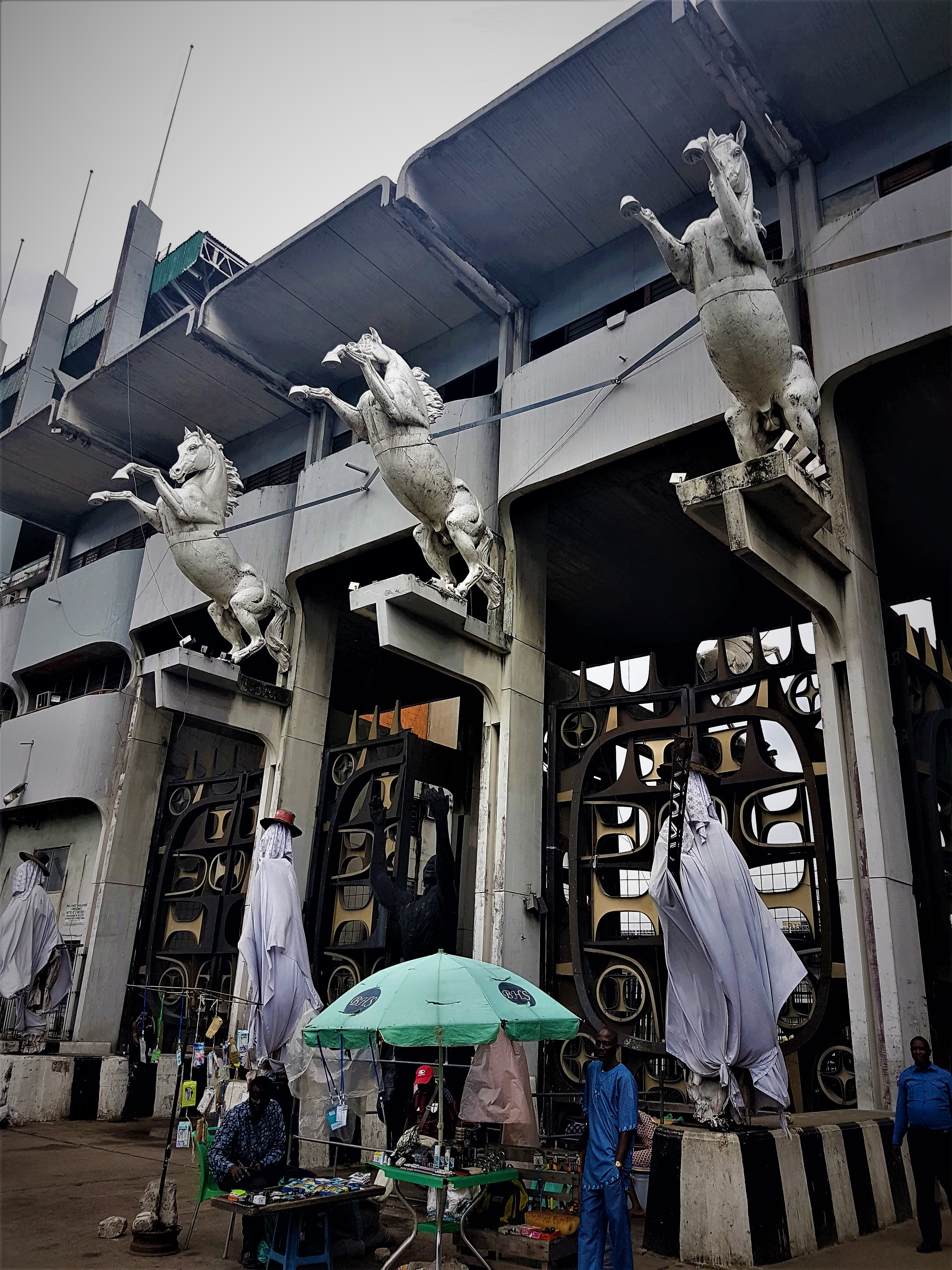
- Entrance to Tafawa Balewa Square
- Interactive map of Tafawa Balewa Square
- Address: Onikan, Lagos, Nigeria
- Location: Lagos Island, Lagos
- Coordinates: 6°26′50″N 3°24′5″E
- Owner: Lagos State Government
- Capacity: 50,000
- Type: Public square

Construction
- Opened: 1972

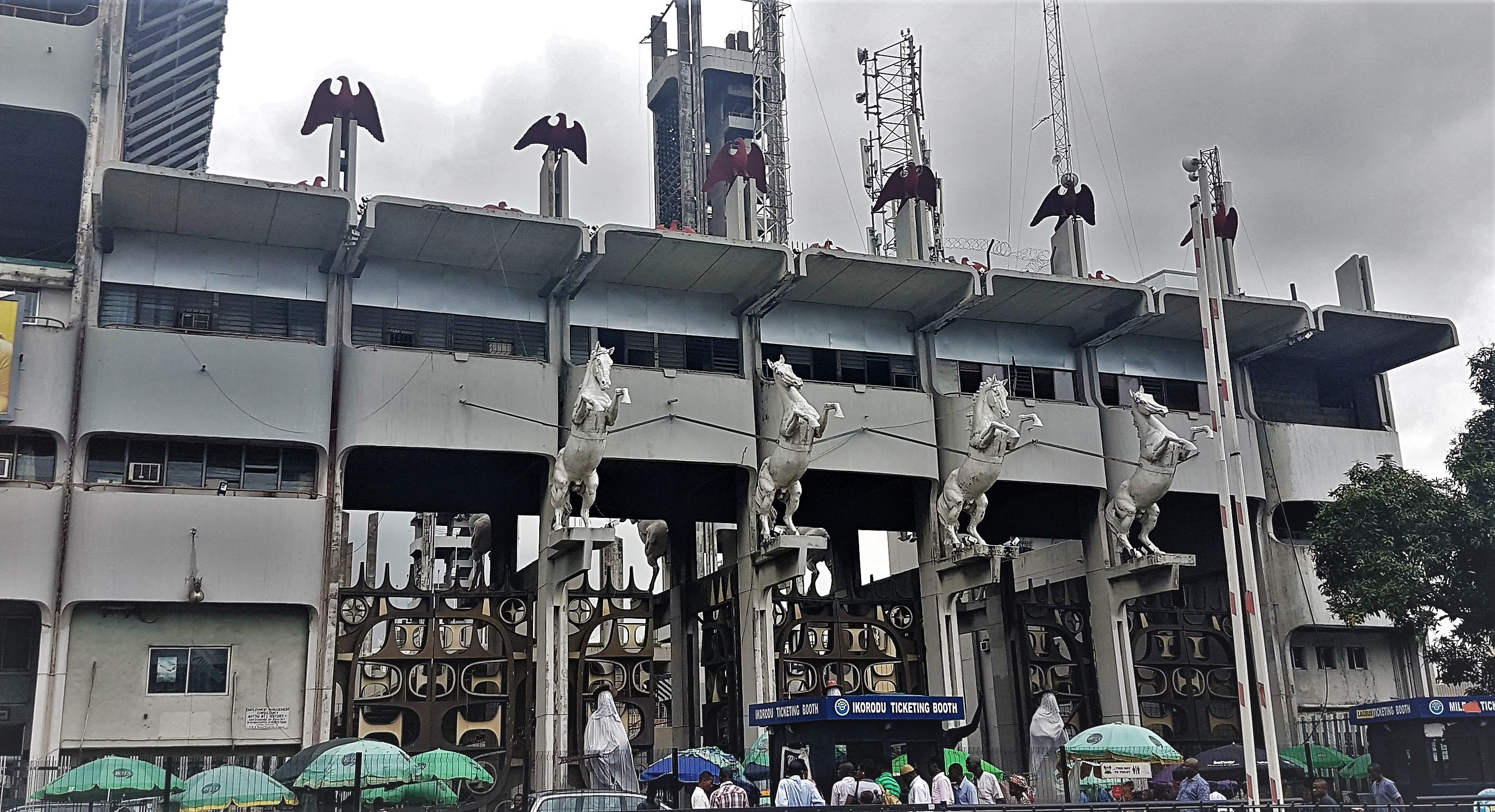
Tafawa Balewa Square

The Tafawa Balewa Square (TBS) is a 14.5-hectare (35.8-acre) ceremonial ground (originally called "Race Course") in Lagos Island, Lagos.

== History ==
Lagos Race Course now TBS, was a sports field that hosted horse racing, but included a section for football and ground to play cricket. The land was provided to colonial authorities by Oba Dosunmu in 1859, who thereafter built up the surrounding areas. The course was later demolished by the government of Yakubu Gowon to make way for Tafawa Balewa Square. In its hey days, the course hosted the Empire Day parades. The horse racing track was about seven to eight furlongs or a mile.

In 1960, the course was redeveloped to celebrate Nigeria's independence and the lowering of the union jack.

== Location ==
TBS was constructed in 1972 over the site of a defunct track for horse racing. 45/57 Massey Bamgboshe Street on Lagos Island, Lagos It is bounded by Awolowo road, Cable Street, Force road, Catholic Mission street and the 26-storey independence building.

== Monuments ==
The entrance to the square has gigantic sculptures of four white horses hovering above the gate and seven red eagles, which are symbols from the national emblem signifying Strength and Dignity respectively. Other monuments in the square include the Remembrance Arcade (with memorials to World War I, World War II and Nigerian Civil War victims) and the 26-storey Independence House, built in 1963 which was for a long time, the tallest building in Nigeria.

== Cricket ground ==
Tafawa Balewa Square Cricket Oval
- Interactive map of Tafawa Balewa Square Cricket Oval

Ground information
- Location: Lagos
- Country: Nigeria
- Capacity: 75000
- End names
- n/a n/a

International information
- First men's T20I: 4 October 2023: Nigeria v Rwanda
- Last men's T20I: 15 October 2023: Nigeria v Rwanda
- First women's T20I: 28 March 2022: Ghana v Rwanda
- Last women's T20I: 3 March 2024: Nigeria v Rwanda
- As of 3 March 2024; Source: ESPNcricinfo

The square has a capacity for 55,000 people. Facilities at the square include a shopping center, airlines ticketing agencies, restaurants, car parking and a bus terminal.

The cricket ground, the Tafawa Balewa Square Cricket Oval, is widely considered as the 'traditional home of cricket' in Nigeria. It hosted matches in the North-Western sub region of the 2018–19 ICC T20 World Cup Africa Qualifier tournament. The ground was closed for 18 months to complete a renovation from a concrete surface to 10-strip turf to meet the ICC standards. The renovation was completed in January 2022, following which the ground hosted its first international cricket matches in the 2022 Nigeria Invitational Women's T20I Tournament.

== Historical events ==
Major national events at TBS includes Nigeria's independence celebration which took place on 1 October 1960 with the Prime Minister, Tafawa Balewa, delivering his speech. Democracy Day, as well as other multifarious events such as musical jamborees and religious gatherings.

The Lagos State Government hosted a Special Lagos Day during the 2024 edition of the Nigerian Bar Association Annual General Conference. The event was held 27 August 2024.

== Environment and Climate ==
The TBS which is a ceremonial ground in Nigeria have been faced with several environmental issues in the past years. The surrounding fence has been a dumpsite where refuse and other plastic are being deposited. There is also the issue of erosion in the region as a result of blocked drainage. As a result of the poor waste management in the area, the environment in the iconic square looks quite unkempt.
