= Captain (cricket) =

Member of a cricket team

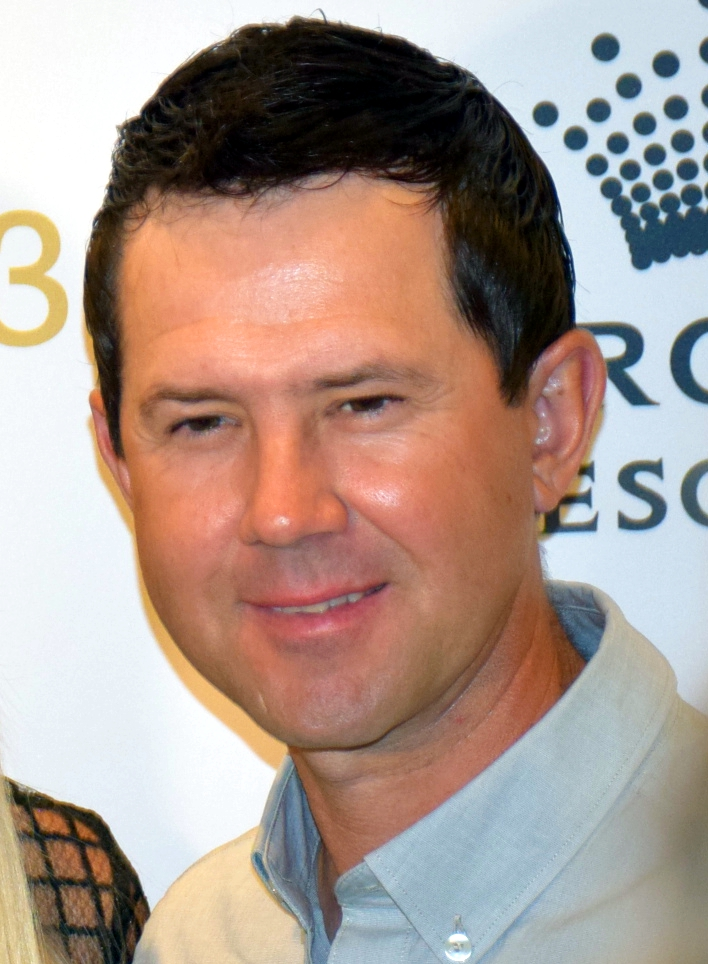
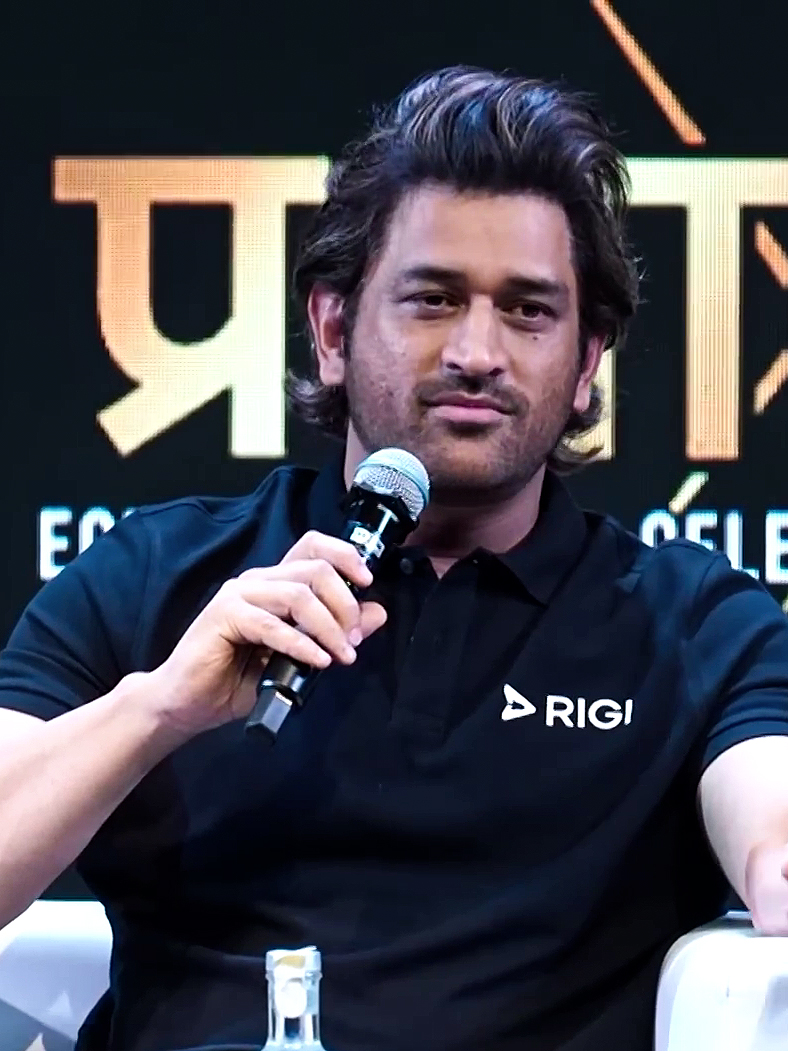
Ricky Ponting (left) is the most successful ICC tournament-winning captain, having won 2 Cricket World Cups and 2 Champions Trophies as captain. MS Dhoni (right) is the only captain to win all 3 ICC limited-overs tournaments - The Cricket World Cup, the Champions Trophy and the T20 World Cup.
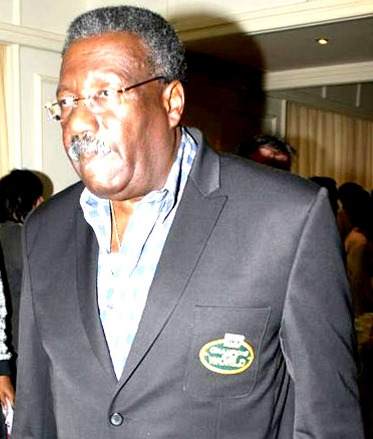
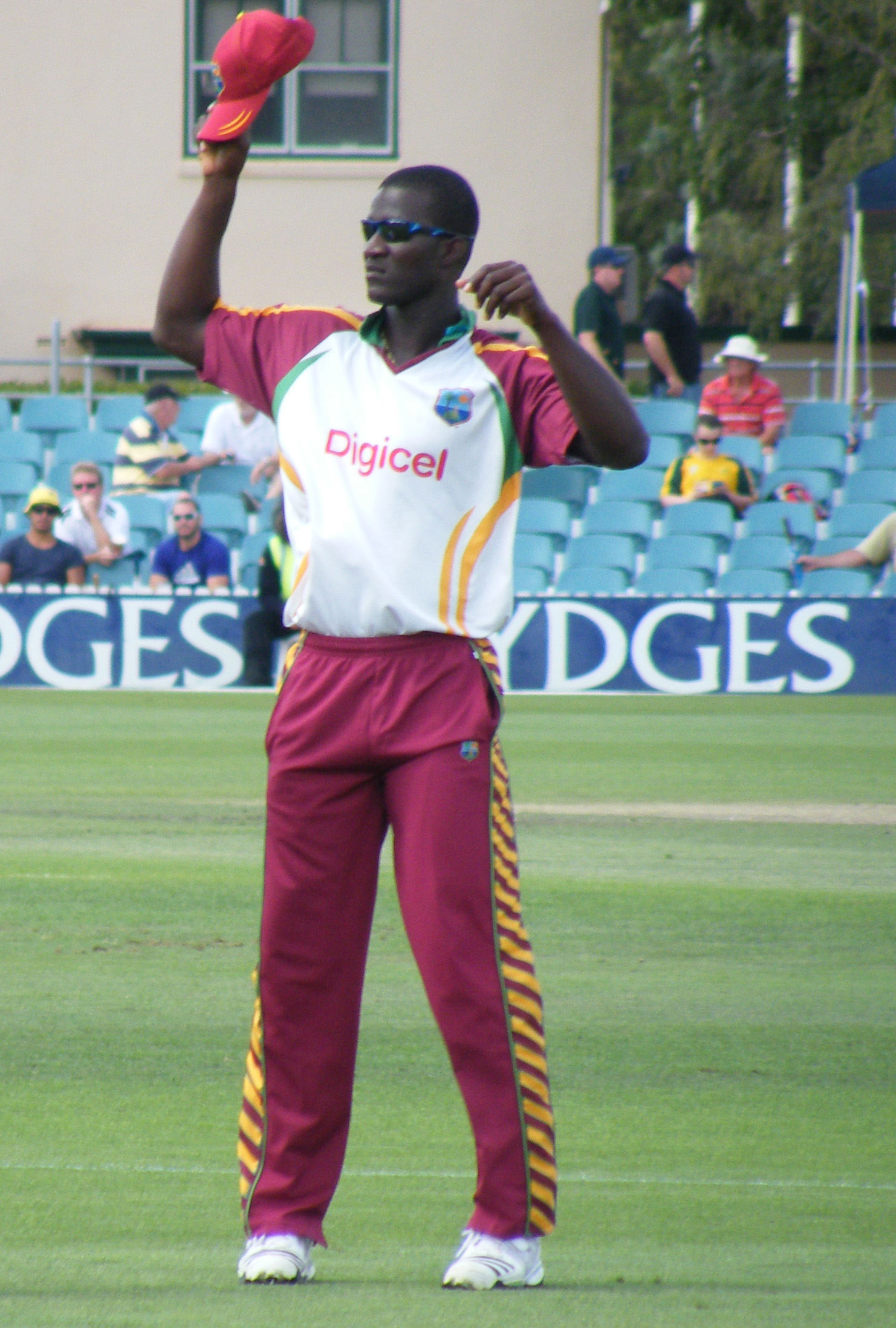
Clive Lloyd (left) is the first captain to win 2 Cricket World Cups alongside being the tournament's first ever victorius captain, while Darren Sammy (right) is the only captain to win 2 T20 World Cups.
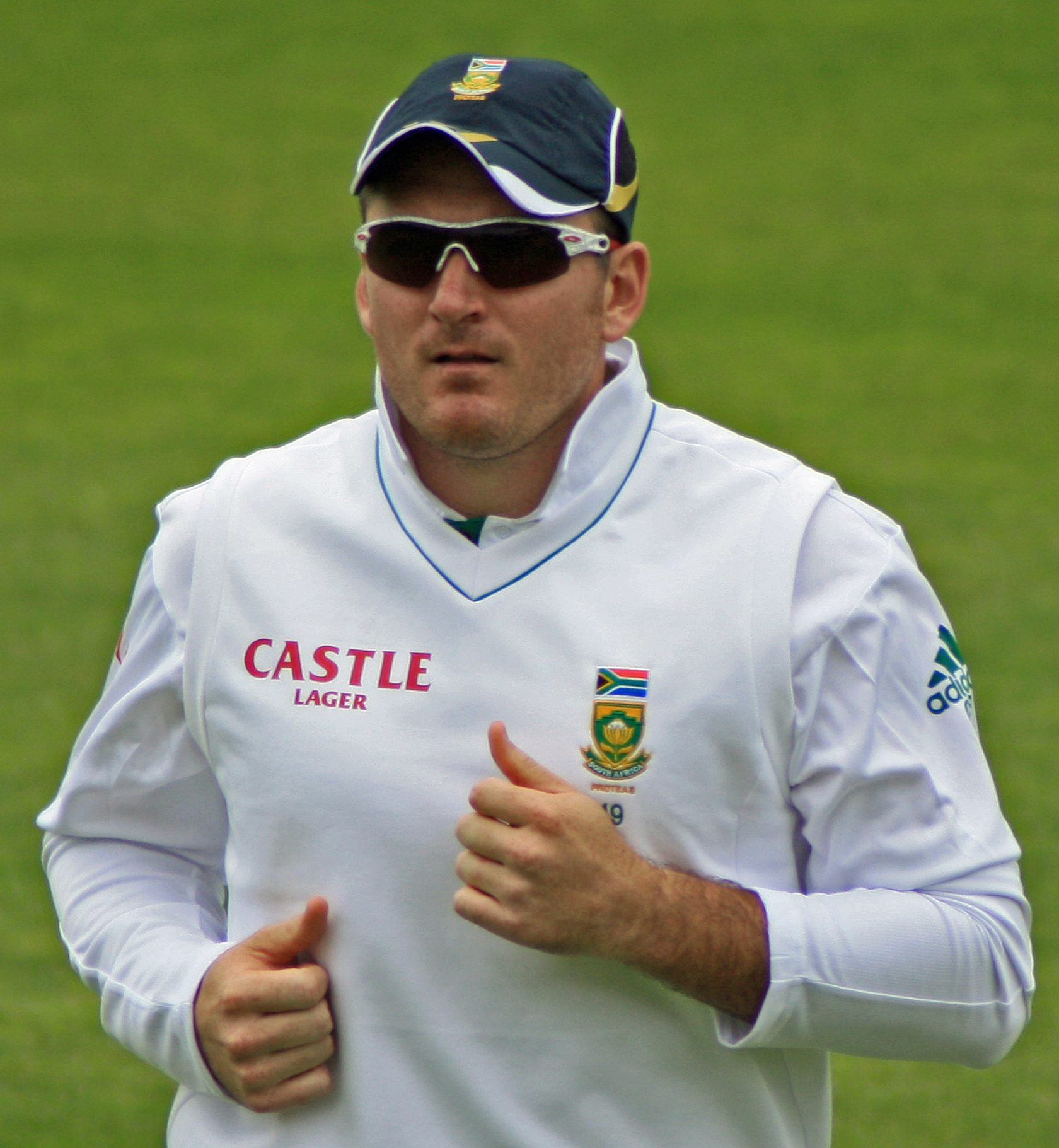
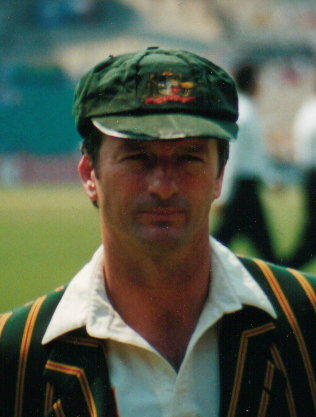
Graeme Smith (left) holds the record for most Test matches as captain, as well as most Test wins. Steve Waugh (right) is the most successful Test captain, with a winning ratio of 72%.
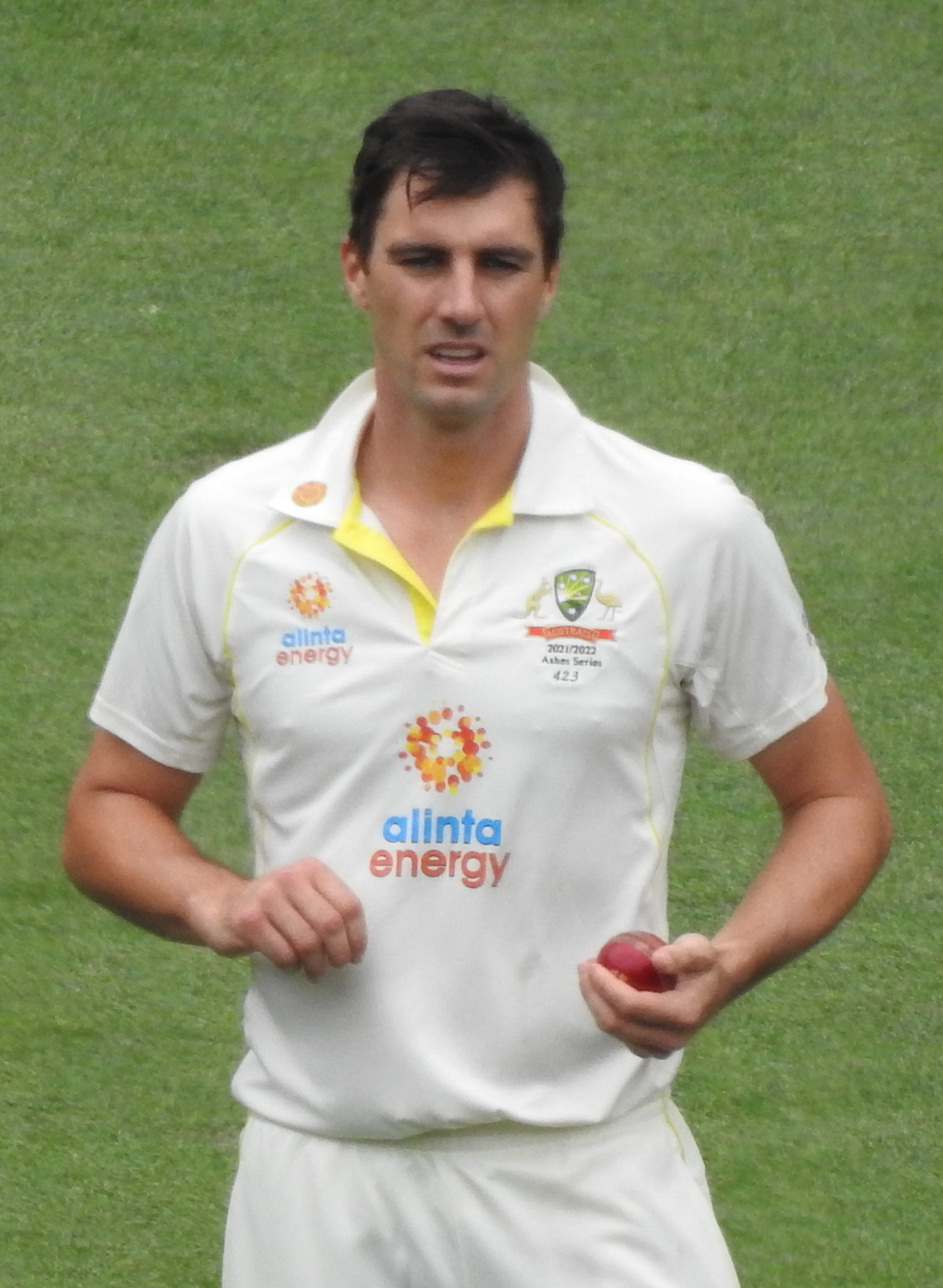
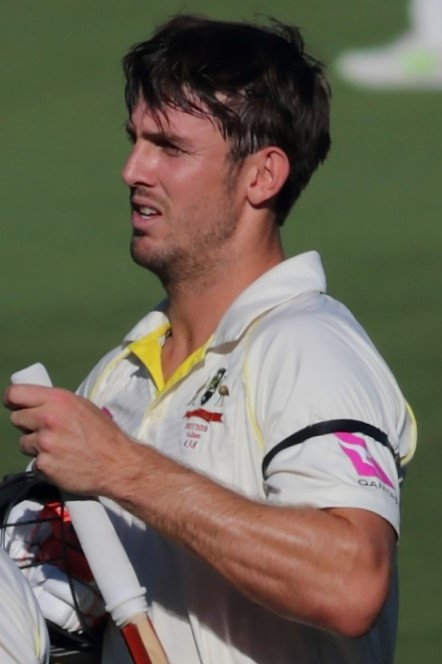
Some countries opt for a split captaincy, with different captains for different formats to manage workload. Pat Cummins (left) captains Australia in Tests and ODIs, while Mitchell Marsh (right) leads the team in T20Is.

The captain of a cricket team, often referred to as the skipper, is the appointed leader, having several additional roles and responsibilities over and above those of the other players. As in other sports, the captain is usually experienced and has good communication skills, and is likely to be one of the most regular members of the team, as the captain is responsible for the team selection. Before the game the captains toss for innings. During the match the captain decides the team's batting order, who will bowl each over, and where each fielder will be positioned. While the captain has the final say, decisions are often collaborative. A captain's knowledge of the complexities of cricket strategy and tactics, and shrewdness in the field, may contribute significantly to the team's success.

Due to the smaller coaching/management role played out by support staff, as well as the need for greater on-field decision-making, the captain of a cricket team typically shoulders more responsibility for results than team captains in other sports.

== Captain's responsibilities ==
=== During a match ===
==== The toss ====
Starting from team selection and then toss Before the start of a match the home captain tosses a coin and the away captain call heads or tails. The captain who wins the toss is given the choice of whether to bat or bowl first. The decision usually depends on the condition of the pitch and whether it is likely to deteriorate, the weather conditions and the weather forecast.

The decision also depends on the relative strengths of the team's batting and bowling. For instance in Test cricket, a side with only fast bowlers may choose to bowl first to try to take advantage of any early moisture in the pitch, knowing that it will be harder to take wickets later in the match. Similarly a side with a weak opening batting pair may choose to bowl first in order to protect their batsmen.

==== Fielding positions ====
The captain decides where the fielders will stand, in consultation with the bowler and sometimes other senior players. The fielding positions will usually be dictated by the type of bowler, the batsman's batting style, and the captain's assessment of the state of the match (and hence whether to set an attacking or a defensive field).

==== Bowling ====
The captain decides when each bowler will bowl. If a batsman is seeking to dominate the current bowler, the captain may ask someone else to bowl; alternatively, keeping the bowler on may be deemed the best chance of getting the batsman out or restricting the scoring rate. If the regular bowlers are not achieving the desired results, the captain may decide to use non-regular bowlers to attempt to unsettle the batsmen. The captain may also change the bowlers around to introduce variation, and to prevent the batsmen getting "set".

In limited overs cricket the captain additionally has to make certain that bowlers bowl no more than their allotted maximum number of overs, and that experienced bowlers are available at the end of the batting side's innings, when the batsmen are usually looking to take risks to attack and score quickly.

In the longer forms of cricket, when a new ball becomes available the captain decides whether to use it, and when given that it can be taken any time after it becomes available.

==== Batting order ====
When the team bats, the captain decides the batting order. In professional cricket the captain usually changes the established batting order only for exceptional reasons, because batsmen tend to specialise in batting at certain positions. However, in certain circumstances it may be in the team's interest to change the batting order. If quick runs are needed, a naturally attacking batsman may be promoted up the order. A player who is 'in form' may be promoted to a higher batting position, at the expense of a player who is 'out of form'.

If a wicket falls near the end of a day's play, especially if the light is failing, or if the bowlers seem particularly confident, the captain may choose to send in a non-specialist batsman, referred to as a nightwatchman. If the nightwatchman does not get out before the end of that day's play then the specialist batsman will have been protected, and will not need to bat until the following day when conditions are likely to have improved. If the nightwatchman does get out, the cost of losing a late wicket will have been minimised, because the specialist batsman is still available to bat.

==== Declarations ====
The captain may declare the team's innings closed at any time, but usually only does so as an attacking ploy, for instance if the captain thinks the team has enough runs to win the match, or if a sudden change in conditions has made it advantageous to bowl rather than bat.

==== Follow-on ====
In a two-innings match, if the situation arises the captain decides whether to impose the follow-on.

Appeals

Fielding captains may withdraw appeals with consent of the umpires. This often occurs in cases of injury, miscommunication, or unsportsmanlike conduct, and is considered to uphold the spirit of cricket and fair play within the game.

==== Miscellaneous ====
The captain is also consulted on whether an injured batsman from the opposing team may use a runner when batting. Permission is usually given if the batsman has become injured during the course of the match, but if the batsman was carrying the injury at the start of the match then the captain may refuse. (As of 2012, runners are not allowed in Test cricket and injured batsmen are required to continue batting with the injury or retire hurt.)

=== Other duties ===
As well as decisions taken either immediately before or during a match, captains also often have some responsibility for the good running of the cricket club. For instance, they may decide when the team is to practice, and for how long. In professional cricket the captain often has some say in who will form the squad from which teams are selected, and may also decide how young up-and-coming players are to be encouraged and improved, and how members of the squad who are not regularly selected for first-team matches are to gain match practice.

Prior to July 2015, the captain was responsible for deciding when to take batting and bowling powerplays in limited overs matches.

== Vice-captain ==
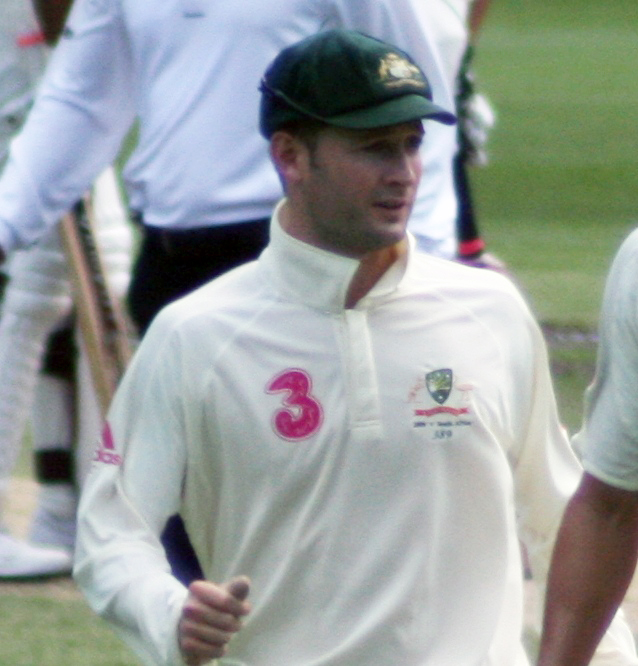
Vice-captains are sometimes considered the full-time successor to the incumbent captain. Michael Clarke was Australia's vice-captain for three years before succeeding Ricky Ponting as captain in 2011.

The captain may be assisted by a vice-captain or in some instances joint vice-captains. This is particularly useful if the captain is forced to leave the field of play during fielding. Some teams also allocate the vice-captain a more or less formal role in assisting with team selection, discipline, field-setting and so on. Sometimes the role of vice-captain is seen as preparation for the player(s) becoming the captain of the side in future.

== Current men's international captains ==
=== ICC Full Members ===
Nation	Format	Captain	Vice-captain(s)
Afghanistan	Test	Rahmat Shah	Ikram Alikhil
Afghanistan	ODI	Rahmat Shah	Rahmanullah Gurbaz
Afghanistan	T20I	Ibrahim Zadran	Vacant
Australia	Test	Pat Cummins	Steve Smith / Travis Head
Australia	ODI	Pat Cummins	Mitchell Marsh
Australia	T20I	Mitchell Marsh	Travis Head
Bangladesh	Test	Najmul Hossain Shanto	Mehidy Hasan Miraz
Bangladesh	ODI	Litton Das	Tawhid Hridoy
Bangladesh	T20I	Litton Das	Tawhid Hridoy
England	Test	Joe Root	Vacant
England	ODI	Harry Brook	Vacant
England	T20I	Harry Brook	Jacob Bethell
India	Test	Shubman Gill	KL Rahul
India	ODI	Shubman Gill	Shreyas Iyer
India	T20I	Shreyas Iyer	Tilak Varma
Ireland	Test	Andrew Balbirnie	Paul Stirling
Ireland	ODI	Paul Stirling	Lorcan Tucker
Ireland	T20I	Lorcan Tucker	Vacant
New Zealand	Test	Tom Latham	Mitchell Santner
New Zealand	ODI	Mitchell Santner	Vacant
New Zealand	T20I	Mitchell Santner	Michael Bracewell
Pakistan	Test	Babar Azam	Vacant
Pakistan	ODI	Shaheen Afrdi	Salman Ali Agha
Pakistan	T20I	Sahibzada Farhan	Vacant
South Africa	Test	Temba Bavuma	Aiden Markram
South Africa	ODI	Temba Bavuma	Aiden Markram
South Africa	T20I	Aiden Markram	Keshav Maharaj
Sri Lanka	Test	Kusal Mendis	Vacant
Sri Lanka	ODI	Kusal Mendis	Vacant
Sri Lanka	T20I	Kusal Mendis	Vacant
West Indies	Test	Roston Chase	Jomel Warrican
West Indies	ODI	Shai Hope	Vacant
West Indies	T20I	Shai Hope	Vacant
Zimbabwe	Test	Richard Ngarava	Brian Bennett
Zimbabwe	ODI	Richard Ngarava	Sikandar Raza
Zimbabwe	T20I	Sikandar Raza	Richard Ngarava

=== Associate Members ===
Nation	Format	Captain	Vice-captain
Argentina	All	Pedro Baron	Hernán Fennell
Austria	All	Aqib Iqbal	
Bahamas	All	Akash Gulati	Marc Taylor
Bahrain	All	Asif Ali	Prashant Kurup
Belgium	All	Ali Raza	Sheraz Sheikh
Belize	All	Maurice Castillo	
Bermuda	All	Terryn Fray	Derrick Brangman
Bhutan	All	Ranjung Mikyo Dorji	Gakul Ghalley
Botswana	All	Karabo Motlhanka	Thatayaone Tshose
Brazil	All	Michel Assuncao	Luiz Muller
Bulgaria	All	Prakash Mishra	
Cameroon	All	Faustin Mpegna	Abega Nyoma
Cambodia	All	Luqman Butt	
Canada	All	Hamza Tariq	Harsh Thaker
Cayman Islands	All	Ramon Sealy	
Cook Islands	All	Ma'ara Ave	Cory Dickson
Chile	All	Alexander Carthew	
China	All	Tian Sen Qun	
Costa Rica	All	Christopher Prasad	
Croatia	All	Anthony Razmilic	
Cyprus	All	Alexander Senn	Roshan Siriwardena
Czech Republic	All	Dylan Steyn	
Denmark	All	Hamid Shah	Saif Ahmad
Estonia	All	Arslan Amjad	
Eswatini	All	Adil Butt	Mancoba Jele
Fiji	All	Seru Tupou	Peni Vuniwaqa
Finland	All	Amjad Sher	
France	All	Dawood Ahmadzai	Gustav McKeon
Germany	All	Musaddiq Ahmed	
Ghana	All	Obed Harvey	
Gibraltar	All	Kieron Ferrary	Louis Bruce
Greece	All	Christodoulos Bogdanos	
Guernsey	All	Oliver Nightingale	Martin-Dale Bradley
Hong Kong	All	Yasim Murtaza	Babar Hayat
Hungary	All	Vinoth Ravindran	Abbas Ghani
Indonesia	All	Gede Arta	Danilson Hawoe
Iran	All	Dad Dahani	
Isle of Man	All	Oliver Webster	
Israel	All	Shailesh Bangera	Josh Evans
Italy	All	Harry Manenti	
Ivory Coast	All	Dosso Issiaka	
Japan	All	Kendel Kadowaki-Fleming	Reo Sakurano-Thomas
Jersey	All	Charles Perchard	
Kenya	All	Dhiren Gondaria	Lucas Oluoch
Kuwait	All	Mohammed Aslam	Bilal Tahir
Lesotho	All	Maaz Khan	Chachole Tlali
Luxembourg	All	Shiv Gill	
Malawi	All	Donnex Kansonkho	Sami Sohail
Mali	All	Yacouba Konate	
Malaysia	All	Syed Aziz	Virandeep Singh
Maldives	All	Hassan Rasheed	Azyan Farhath
Malta	All	Varun Thamotharam	
Mexico	All	Shantanu Kaveri	Shoaib Rafiq
Mozambique	All	Filipe Cossa	
Namibia	All	Gerhard Erasmus	JJ Smit
Nepal	ODI	Sandeep Lamichhane	Dipendra Singh Airee
Nepal	T20I	Dipendra Singh Airee	Vacant
Netherlands	All	Bas de Leede	Max O'Dowd
Nigeria	All	Sylvester Okpe	Ademola Onikoyi
Norway	All	Khizer Ahmed	
Oman	All	Vinayak Shukla	
Panama	All	Anilkumar Ahir	Yusuf Ebrahim
Papua New Guinea	All	Assad Vala	Sese Bau
Peru	All	Matthew Spry	
Philippines	All	Henry Tyler	
Portugal	All	Moises Henriques	Carlos Nunes
Qatar	All	Mirza Mohammed Baig	Imal Liyanage
Romania	All	Vasu Saini	Adrian Lascu
Rwanda	All	Didier Ndikubwimana	
Samoa	All	Sean Solia	Caleb Jasmat
Saudi Arabia	All	Waji Ul Hassan	Ishtiaq Ahmad
Scotland	All	Richie Berrington	George Munsey
Serbia	All	Mark Pavlovic	Braithyn Pecic
Seychelles	All	Tim Horpinitch	
Sierra Leone	All	Lansana Lamin	Abubakar Kamara
Singapore	All	Manpreet Singh	Jeevan Santhanam
South Korea	All	Jun Hyunwoo	
Spain	All	Christian Munoz-Mills	
Suriname	All	Arun Gokoel	
Sweden	All	Imal Zuwak	
Tanzania	All	Kassim Nassoro	
Thailand	All	Austin Lazarus	
Turkey	All	Muhammad Fahad	Ali Turkmen
Uganda	All	Juma Miyagi	
United Arab Emirates	ODI	Harpreet Singh	Aayan Khan
United Arab Emirates	T20I	Muhammad Waseem	Aayan Khan
United States	All	Monank Patel	Saiteja Mukkamalla
Vanuatu	All	Joshua Rasu	Ronald Tari

== Current women's international captains ==
=== ICC Full Members ===
Nation	Format	Captain	Vice-captain(s)
Australia	Test	Sophie Molineux	Ashleigh Gardner; Tahlia McGrath
Australia	ODI	Sophie Molineux	Ashleigh Gardner; Tahlia McGrath
Australia	T20I	Sophie Molineux	Ashleigh Gardner; Tahlia McGrath
Bangladesh	Test	Nigar Sultana	Nahida Akter
Bangladesh	ODI	Nigar Sultana	Nahida Akter
Bangladesh	T20I	Nahida Akter	Sobhana Mostary
England	Test	Nat Sciver-Brunt	Charlie Dean
England	ODI	Nat Sciver-Brunt	Charlie Dean
England	T20I	Nat Sciver-Brunt	Charlie Dean
India	Test	Smriti Mandhana	Deepti Sharma
India	ODI	Smriti Mandhana	Deepti Sharma
India	T20I	Smriti Mandhana	Deepti Sharma
Ireland	Test	Gaby Lewis	Orla Prendergast
Ireland	ODI	Gaby Lewis	Orla Prendergast
Ireland	T20I	Gaby Lewis	Orla Prendergast
New Zealand	Test	Amelia Kerr	Vacant
New Zealand	ODI	Amelia Kerr	Vacant
New Zealand	T20I	Amelia Kerr	Vacant
Pakistan	Test	Fatima Sana	Vacant
Pakistan	ODI	Fatima Sana	Vacant
Pakistan	T20I	Fatima Sana	Vacant
South Africa	Test	Laura Wolvaardt	Vacant
South Africa	ODI	Laura Wolvaardt	Vacant
South Africa	T20I	Laura Wolvaardt	Vacant
Sri Lanka	Test	Chamari Athapaththu	Anushka Sanjeewani
Sri Lanka	ODI	Chamari Athapaththu	Anushka Sanjeewani
Sri Lanka	T20I	Chamari Athapaththu	Anushka Sanjeewani
West Indies	Test	Hayley Matthews	Chinelle Henry
West Indies	ODI	Hayley Matthews	Chinelle Henry
West Indies	T20I	Hayley Matthews	Chinelle Henry
Zimbabwe	Test	Josephine Nkomo	Nomvelo Sibanda
Zimbabwe	ODI	Josephine Nkomo	Nomvelo Sibanda
Zimbabwe	T20I	Josephine Nkomo	Nomvelo Sibanda

=== Associate Members ===
Nation	Captain	Vice-captain
Botswana	Laura Mophakedi	
Brazil	Roberta Moretti Avery	
Chile	Jeannette Gonzalez	
China	Huang Zhuo	
France	Marie Violleau	
Germany	Anuradha Doddaballapur	Christina Gough
Hong Kong	Kary Chan	
Iran	Nasimeh Rahshetaei	
Jersey	Rosa Hill	
Kenya	Queentor Abel	Sharon Juma
Lesotho	Boitumelo Phelenyane	
Malawi	Mary Mabvuka	
Mexico	Caroline Owen	
Mozambique	Fatima Guirrugo	
Namibia	Irene van Zyl	Yasmeen Khan
Nepal	Indu Barma	Puja Mahato
Nigeria	Samantha Agazuma	
Papua New Guinea	Kaia Arua	
Rwanda	Sarah Uwera	
Samoa	Regina Lili'i	
Sierra Leone	Linda Bull	
Singapore	Shafina Mahesh	
South Korea	Inyeong Oh	
Spain	Elspeth Fowler	
Tanzania	Fatuma Kibasu	
Thailand	Naruemol Chaiwai	Nannapat Koncharoenkai
Uganda	Rita Musamali	
United Arab Emirates	Chaya Mughal	
United States	Sindhu Sriharsha	
Vanuatu	Selina Solman	

== See also ==
- The Art of Captaincy, a 1985 book by former England captain Mike Brearley
