= Gambia women's national cricket team =

Cricket team

The Gambia
- Flag of The Gambia
- Association: Gambia Cricket Association

International Cricket Council
- ICC status: Associate member (2017); Affiliate member (2002)
- ICC region: Africa
ICC Rankings	Current	Best-ever
T20I	---	

T20 Internationals
- First T20I: v Nigeria at Tafawa Balewa Square Cricket Oval, Lagos; 29 March 2022
- Last T20I: v Sierra Leone at Tafawa Balewa Square Cricket Oval, Lagos; 2 April 2022
T20Is	Played	Won/Lost
Total	4	0/4 (0 ties, 0 no results)
This year	0	0/0 (0 ties, 0 no results)
- As of 1 January 2024

The Gambia national women's cricket team is the team that represents The Gambia in international women's cricket. The team has played international cricket since 2015 and made its Twenty20 International (T20I) debut at the 2022 Nigeria Invitational Women's T20I Tournament.

== History ==
Around 2007, the ICC Africa regional office mandated development programs for women's cricket. In 2008 the Gambia Cricket Association established a women's academy at July 22 Square in Banjul.

In 2015, Gambia hosted the inaugural North West Africa Cricket Council (NWACC) women's twenty20 tournament. In that competition, which was disrupted by the Western African Ebola virus epidemic, the national team finished runner-up to Sierra Leone, and recorded victories over both Ghana and Mali. The tournament matches were played at the Medical Research Centre (MRC) Ground in Bakau, even though it was reportedly in poor condition.

Gambia also played at the 2016 edition of the tournament in Ghana.

In April 2018, the International Cricket Council (ICC) granted full Women's Twenty20 International (WT20I) status to all its members. Therefore, all Twenty20 matches played between Gambia women and other ICC members since 1 July 2018 have the full WT20Is status. Gambia played their first official WT20I matches in March/April 2022 during the 2022 Nigeria Invitational Women's T20I Tournament.

== Records and statistics ==
International Match Summary — Gambia Women

Last updated 2 April 2022

Playing Record
Format	M	W	L	T	NR	Inaugural Match
Twenty20 Internationals	4	0	4	0	0	29 March 2022

=== Twenty20 International ===
T20I record versus other nations

Records complete to WT20I #1050. Last updated 2 April 2022.

Opponent	M	W	L	T	NR	First match	First win
ICC Associate members
Ghana	1	0	1	0	0	30 March 2022	
Nigeria	1	0	1	0	0	29 March 2022	
Rwanda	1	0	1	0	0	1 April 2022	
Sierra Leone	1	0	1	0	0	2 April 2022	

== See also ==
- List of Gambia women Twenty20 International cricketers
- Gambia national cricket team
