= List of Nigeria women Twenty20 International cricketers =

This is a list of Nigeria women Twenty20 International cricketers. A Women's Twenty20 International (WT20I) is an international cricket match between two representative teams. A WT20I is played under the rules of Twenty20 cricket. In April 2018, the International Cricket Council (ICC) granted full international status to Twenty20 women's matches played between member sides from 1 July 2018 onwards.

The list is arranged in the order in which each player won her first Twenty20 cap. Where more than one player won her first Twenty20 cap in the same match, their surnames are listed alphabetically.

== Key ==
General

- † – Wicket-keeper
- First – Year of debut
- Last – Year of latest game
- Mat – Number of matches played

Batting

- Runs – Runs scored in career
- HS – Highest score
- Avg – Average runs scored per dismissal
- * – Batsman remained not out
- 50 – Number of half centuries

Bowling

- Balls – Balls bowled in career
- Wkt – Wickets taken in career
- BBI – Best bowling in an innings
- Ave – Average runs conceded per wicket

Fielding

- Ca – Catches taken
- St – Stumpings taken

== Players ==
Statistics are correct as of 20 June 2026.

General					Batting				Bowling				Fielding		Ref
No.	Name	First	Last	Mat	Runs	HS	Avg	50	Balls	Wkt	BBI	Ave	Ca	St	Ref
1	Taiwo Abdulquadri	2019	2022	20	21	11	10.50	0	399	22	3/16	14.77	5	0	
2	Samantha Agazuma‡	2019	2021	19	159	28*	13.25	0	–	–	–	–	5	0	
3	Mary Desmond	2019	2022	25	26	11	4.33	0	519	20	3/21	17.80	6	0	
4	Joy Efosa†	2019	2021	15	56	13	7.00	0	187	11	2/15	16.00	2	0	
5	Favour Eseigbe‡†	2019	2026	74	536	47	10.93	0	1011	57	4/4	13.70	14	0	
6	Blessing Etim‡	2019	2024	62	634	50*	14.08	1	611	25	4/0	21.56	12	0	
7	Blessing Frank	2019	2019	8	7	4*	3.50	0	–	–	–	–	0	0	
8	Fate Fyneface	2019	2019	12	64	18	9.14	0	24	0	–	–	1	0	
9	Blessing Nwobodo	2019	2019	9	91	33*	15.16	0	–	–	–	–	0	0	
10	Agatha Obulor‡	2019	2023	30	135	25	7.94	0	321	18	3/9	14.72	6	0	
11	Racheal Samson	2019	2026	64	54	10*	4.15	0	1169	57	4/13	15.35	7	0	
12	Hanah Ayoka	2019	2019	4	24	12	6.00	0	30	1	1/34	50.00	1	0	
13	Grace Ephraim	2019	2019	2	0	0	0.00	0	–	–	–	–	0	0	
14	Oyewole Oyronke†	2019	2019	9	39	13*	6.50	0	–	–	–	–	2	2	
15	Abigail Igbobie†	2019	2024	34	121	24	6.72	0	–	–	–	–	9	5	
16	Kehinde Abdulquadri†	2019	2022	22	225	41	11.84	0	–	–	–	–	9	0	
17	Salome Sunday	2019	2026	84	1,337	63	21.91	3	114	5	3/20	19.80	24	0	
18	Omonye Asika‡	2019	2023	28	208	33*	9.04	0	–	–	–	–	4	0	
19	Esther Sandy	2019	2026	59	681	63	12.84	2	–	–	–	–	22	0	
20	Miracle Imimole	2021	2022	13	5	2*	5.00	0	228	9	2/5	19.00	2	0	
21	Oseyande Omonkhobio	2021	2026	24	171	24	8.55	0	391	12	2/14	22.91	5	0	
22	Chinyenum George	2021	2023	7	37	13*	9.25	0	80	7	3/18	10.85	1	0	
23	Lucky Piety†	2021	2026	50	785	92	22.42	3	565	34	4/10	12.67	17	0	
24	Lillian Udeh	2022	2026	50	134	23	6.70	0	993	59	6/7	12.01	15	0	
25	Peculiar Agboya	2022	2025	40	206	33*	8.24	0	720	36	3/11	13.38	7	0	
26	Rukayat Abdulrasak	2022	2025	27	10	3	2.00	0	530	20	4/9	18.45	0	0	
27	Sarah Etim†	2022	2026	52	220	25	8.80	0	–	–	–	–	26	13	
28	Adeshola Adekunle	2023	2026	43	123	38	7.68	0	732	42	4/13	13.78	13	0	
29	Christabel Chukwuonye	2023	2026	40	231	43*	8.88	0	340	27	4/18	10.00	11	0	
30	Victory Igbinedion	2023	2026	16	187	28	17.00	0	–	–	–	–	1	0	
31	Usen Peace	2024	2026	24	40	8*	4.44	0	462	19	3/5	16.68	7	0	
32	Annointed Akhigbe	2024	2026	16	86	24	7.81	0	249	12	3/11	16.83	1	0	
33	Muhibat Amusa	2025	2026	15	235	36	15.66	0	294	18	4/18	11.22	2	0	
34	Omosigho Eguakun	2025	2026	12	50	19	5.00	0	–	–	–	–	3	0	
35	Favour Effiong	2026	2026	1	–	–	–	–	12	2	2/2	1.00	0	0	
36	Henrietta Mbam	2026	2026	5	0	0	0.00	0	64	7	3/7	9.00	1	0	
37	Jessica Bieni	2026	2026	6	36	25*	12.00	0	–	–	–	–	2	0	
38	Deborah Bassey	2026	2026	1	8	8	8.00	0	–	–	–	–	0	0	
