= Gisele Ishimwe =

Rwandan cricketer (born 2004)

Personal information
- Full name: Gisele Ishimwe
- Born: 9 September 2004 (age 22)
- Batting: Right-handed
- Bowling: Right-arm medium
- Role: All-rounder

International information
- National side: Rwanda
- T20I debut (cap 5): 26 January 2019 v Nigeria
- Last T20I: 30 October 2024 v Kenya

Career statistics
Competition	WT20I
Matches	87
Runs scored	1,388
Batting average	19.01
100s/50s	1/2
Top score	114*
Balls bowled	304
Wickets	14
Bowling average	19.00
5 wickets in innings	0
10 wickets in match	0
Best bowling	2/2
Catches/stumpings	21/0
- Source: Cricinfo, 30 October 2024

Gisele Ishimwe (born 9 September 2004) is a Rwandan cricketer who plays for the women's national cricket team as an all-rounder.

A right-arm medium pace bowler and right handed batter, Ishimwe scored a Women's Twenty20 International (WT20I) century for the national team in September 2021. More recently, in January 2023, she led the Under-19 team to victories against two ICC Full Member teams during the 2023 ICC Under-19 Women's T20 World Cup, and was player of the match in both matches.

== See also ==
- List of centuries in women's Twenty20 International cricket
- List of Rwanda women Twenty20 International cricketers
