= Nigeria Cricket Federation =

- Sport: Cricket
- Founded: 1957
- Affiliation: International Cricket Council
- Affiliation date: 2002
- Regional affiliation: Africa
- Location: Lagos, Nigeria

Official website
- nigeriacricket.com.ng
- (Nigeria)

The Nigeria Cricket Federation (NCF) is the official governing body of the sport of cricket in Nigeria. Its current headquarters is in Lagos. The NCF is Nigeria's representative at the International Cricket Council (ICC) and has been an associate member of that body since 2002. Nigeria used to be part of the West Africa Cricket Council, which was an ICC member in its own right. The NCF is also a member of the African Cricket Association.

== History ==
In the 19th century, British colonial administrators first introduced and popularised the game of cricket in Nigeria. Nigeria's first international cricket match was against the Gold Coast (now Ghana) in 1904.

The Nigeria Cricket Association (expatriates) and the Nigeria Cricket Association (indigenous) were formed in 1932 and 1933, respectively. In 1951, a joint board of control was inaugurated in Lagos with each association retaining its identity. In 1957, both expatriate and indigenous bodies merged to form the Nigeria Cricket Association (NCA). This name was changed to the Nigeria Cricket Federation (NCF) in 2006.

In the 1960s, the NCF was involved in a movement, which resulted in the formation of a sub-regional cricket body, the West Africa Cricket Federation (WACF), with headquarters in Nigeria. Later, in 1976, the WACF evolved into the West Africa Cricket Conference (WACC). Nigeria was granted Associate Membership of the ICC in 2002.
