= Nigeria women's national cricket team =

Cricket team

Nigeria
- Nigeria Cricket Federation logo
- Association: Nigeria Cricket Federation

Personnel
- Captain: Samantha Agazuma

International Cricket Council
- ICC status: Associate member (2002)
- ICC region: Africa
ICC Rankings	Current	Best-ever
T20I	26th	26th (1 Aug 2025)

International cricket
- First international: v. Kenya at Kampala; 16 December 2011

T20 Internationals
- First T20I: v. Rwanda at National Stadium, Abuja; 26 January 2019
- Last T20I: v. Brazil at Gahanga International Cricket Stadium, Kigali; 20 June 2026
T20Is	Played	Won/Lost
Total	93	49/42 (1 tie, 1 no result)
This year	10	5/5 (0 ties, 0 no results)
T20I kit
- As of 20 June 2026

The Nigeria women's national cricket team represents Nigeria in international women's cricket. The team is organised by the Nigeria Cricket Federation, which has been a member of the International Cricket Council (ICC) since 2002.

== History ==
Nigeria Women made their international debut at the 2011 ICC Africa Women's T20 Tournament in Uganda. The team lost their first game, against Kenya, by ten wickets, but rebounded to win their next match, against Sierra Leone, by six wickets. They lost their remaining three matches (against Namibia, Tanzania, and Uganda), finishing fifth out of six teams overall. In August 2015 Nigeria appeared in an invitation tournament in Dar es Salaam, which featured the Tanzanian national team and a team from India's Mumbai Cricket Association.

In April 2018, the ICC granted full Women's Twenty20 International (WT20I) status to all its members. Therefore, all Twenty20 matches played between Nigeria women and another international side since 1 July 2018 have the WT20I status. Nigeria made its Twenty20 International debut against Rwanda at Abuja on 26 January 2019. The teams played a five-game series which Nigeria won 3-2.

In December 2020, the ICC announced the qualification pathway for the 2023 ICC Women's T20 World Cup. Nigeria were named in the 2021 ICC Women's T20 World Cup Africa Qualifier regional group, alongside ten other teams.

== Squad ==
Updated on 13 March 2024, this lists all the players who played for Nigeria in the past 12 months or were named in the most recent squad.

Name	Age	Batting style	Bowling style	Notes
Batters
Salome Sunday	24	Right-handed	Right-arm medium	
Esther Sandy	27	Right-handed		
Victory Igbinedion	21	Right-handed		
All-rounders
Lucky Piety	19	Right-handed	Right-arm off break	
Blessing Etim	33	Right-handed	Right-arm medium	Captain
Favour Eseigbe	24	Right-handed	Right-arm leg break	Vice-captain
Wicket-keepers
Sarah Etim	26	Right-handed		
Abigail Igbobie	24	Right-handed		
Spin Bowler
Adeshola Adekunle	18	Right-handed	Right-arm off break	
Pace Bowlers
Peculiar Agboya	20	Right-handed	Right-arm medium	
Rukayat Abdulrasak	22	Right-handed	Right-arm medium	
Rachael Samson	24	Right-handed	Right-arm medium	
Christabel Chukwuonye	17	Right-handed	Right-arm medium	
Lillian Udeh	19	Right-handed	Right-arm medium-fast	
Usen Peace	18	Right-handed	Right-arm medium	

== Records and statistics ==
International Match Summary — Nigeria Women

Last updated 20 June 2026

Playing Record
Format	M	W	L	T	NR	Inaugural Match
Twenty20 Internationals	93	49	42	1	1	26 January 2019

=== Twenty20 International ===
- Highest team total: 179/5 v. Malawi on 7 June 2024 at Gahanga B Ground, Kigali.
- Highest individual score: 70, Lucky Piety v. Malawi on 7 June 2024 at Gahanga B Ground, Kigali.
- Best individual bowling figures: 6/7, Lillian Udeh v. Rwanda on 4 June 2024 at Gahanga International Cricket Stadium, Kigali.

Most T20I runs for Nigeria Women

Player	Runs	Average	Career span
Salome Sunday	1,337	21.91	2019–2026
Lucky Piety	785	22.42	2021–2026
Esther Sandy	681	12.84	2019–2026
Blessing Etim	634	14.08	2019–2024
Favour Eseigbe	535	10.93	2019–2026

Most T20I wickets for Nigeria Women

Player	Wickets	Average	Career span
Lillian Udeh	59	12.01	2022–2026
Favour Eseigbe	57	13.70	2019–2026
Racheal Samson	57	15.35	2019–2026
Adeshola Adekunle	42	13.78	2023–2026
Peculiar Agboya	36	13.38	2019–2025

T20I record versus other nations

Records complete to WT20I #2875. Last updated 20 June 2026.

Opponent	M	W	L	T	NR	First match	First win
ICC Full members
Zimbabwe	3	0	3	0	0	11 May 2019	
ICC Associate members
Botswana	5	4	1	0	0	10 June 2021	10 June 2021
Brazil	6	3	3	0	0	9 June 2022	9 June 2022
Cameroon	4	4	0	0	0	13 September 2021	13 September 2021
Gambia	1	1	0	0	0	29 March 2022	29 March 2022
Germany	1	1	0	0	0	10 June 2022	10 June 2022
Ghana	3	3	0	0	0	1 April 2022	1 April 2022
Kenya	7	2	5	0	0	8 June 2021	11 June 2023
Malawi	4	4	0	0	0	7 June 2024	7 June 2024
Mozambique	1	1	0	0	0	6 May 2019	6 May 2019
Namibia	6	1	5	0	0	6 June 2021	8 March 2024
Rwanda	30	13	16	1	0	26 January 2019	26 January 2019
Sierra Leone	8	8	0	0	0	9 September 2021	9 September 2021
Tanzania	6	1	4	0	1	8 May 2019	5 June 2025
Uganda	8	3	5	0	0	11 September 2021	16 June 2023

== Tournament history ==
=== Women's ODI World Cup ===
Women's Cricket World Cup records
Host Year	Round	Position	GP	W	L	T	NR
(England) 1973	Did not qualified						
(India) 1978	Did not qualified						
(New Zealand) 1982	Did not qualified						
(Australia) 1988	Did not qualified						
(England) 1993	Did not qualified						
(India) 1997	Did not qualified						
(New Zealand) 2000	Did not qualified						
(South Africa) 2005	Did not qualified						
(Australia) 2009	Did not qualified						
(India) 2013	Did not qualified						
(England) 2017	Did not qualified						
(New Zealand) 2022	Did not qualified						
(India) 2025	Did not qualified						
Total	0/13	0 Titles	0	0	0	0	0

=== Women's World T20 ===
Twenty20 World Cup records
Host Year	Round	Position	GP	W	L	T	NR
(England) 2009	Did not qualify						
(Cricket West Indies) 2010	Did not qualify						
(Sri Lanka) 2012	Did not qualify						
(Bangladesh) 2014	Did not qualify						
(India) 2016	Did not qualify						
(Cricket West Indies) 2018	Did not qualify						
(Australia) 2020	Did not qualify						
(South Africa) 2023	Did not qualify						
(United Arab Emirates) 2024	Did not qualify						
(England) 2026	To be determined						
Total	–	0 Titles	0	0	0	0	0

=== Women's Cricket World Cup Qualifier ===
ICC Women's Cricket World Cup Qualifier records
Host Year	Round	Position	GP	W	L	T	NR
(Netherlands) 2003	Did not participate						
(South Africa) 2008	Group stage	–	3	1	2	0	0
(Bangladesh) 2011	Group stage	10/10	4	0	4	0	0
(Sri Lanka) 2017	Group stage	–	4	1	3	0	0
(Zimbabwe) 2021	Group stage	–	3	1	2	0	0
(Pakistan) 2025	Did not qualify						
Total	4/5	0 Title	14	3	11	0	0

=== ICC Women's World Twenty20 Qualifier ===
ICC Women's World Twenty20 Qualifier records
Host Year	Round	Position	GP	W	L	T	NR
(Republic of Ireland) 2013	Group stage	6/7	3	1	2	0	0
(Thailand) 2015	3rd place	3/8	5	3	2	0	0
(Netherlands) 2018	Did not participate						
(Scotland) 2019	Did not participate						
(United Arab Emirates) 2022	Did not participate						
(United Arab Emirates) 2024	Did not participate						
Total	2/6	0 Titles	8	4	4	0	0

=== ICC Women's T20 World Cup Africa Qualifier ===
ICC Women's T20 World Cup Africa Qualifier records
Year	Round	Position	GP	W	L	T	NR
(Zimbabwe) 2019	Group stages	–	4	1	3	0	0
(Botswana) 2021	Group stages	–	4	2	2	0	0
Total	2/2	0 Title	8	3	5	0	0

=== ICC Women's T20 World Cup Africa Qualifier Division One ===
ICC Women's T20 World Cup Africa Qualifier Division One records
Year	Round	Position	GP	W	L	T	NR
(Uganda) 2023	Group stages	–	3	1	2	0	0
(Namibia) 2025	DNQ	7/8	5	2	3	0	0
Total	2/2	0 Title	8	3	5	0	0

=== ICC Women's T20 Champions Trophy ===
ICC Women's T20 Champions Trophy records
Host Year	Round	Position	GP	W	L	T	NR
(Sri Lanka) 2027	To be determined						
2031	To be determined						
Total	–	0 Title	0	0	0	0	0

=== Cricket at the African Games ===
Cricket at the African Games records
Host Year	Round	Position	GP	W	L	T	NR
(Ghana) 2023	3rd place	3/8	5	2	2	0	1
(Egypt) 2027	To be determined						
(Democratic Republic of the Congo) 2031	To be determined						
Total	1/1	0 Title	5	2	2	0	1

== See also ==
- List of Nigeria women Twenty20 International cricketers
