= Rwanda women's national cricket team =

Rwanda
- Association: Rwanda Cricket Association

Personnel
- Captain: Marie Bimenyimana
- Coach: Leonard Nhamburo

International Cricket Council
- ICC status: Associate member (2017); Affiliate member (2003)
- ICC region: Africa
ICC Rankings	Current	Best-ever
T20I	25th	24th (26 July 2025)

T20 Internationals
- First T20I: v. Nigeria at National Stadium, Abuja; 26 January 2019
- Last T20I: v. Uganda at Entebbe Cricket Oval, Entebbe; 14 November 2026
T20Is	Played	Won/Lost
Total	141	85/53 (2 ties, 1 no result)
This year	24	15/7 (1 tie, 1 no result)
- As of 14 November 2026

The Rwanda women's national cricket team represents Rwanda in international women's cricket.

== History ==
Rwanda's women's team first played in 2007, playing two matches against Uganda in December of that year, before participating in the 2008–09 East African Women's Championship. Since 2014 the country has hosted the Kwibuka T20 Tournament annually.

In March 2018, Cricket Builds Hope - a charity focused on the use the sport as a tool for social change in Rwanda - commenced the Women's Empowerment Programme, a multi-year project aiming to use cricket to help develop leadership skills amongst women from low-income families in Kigali.

In April 2018, the International Cricket Council (ICC) granted full Women's Twenty20 International (WT20I) status to all its members. Therefore, all Twenty20 matches played between Rwanda women and other ICC members since 1 July 2018 have been full WT20Is.

Rwanda played their first WT20I on 26 January 2019, during a five-match series against Nigeria.

In the 2019 ICC Development Awards, recognising advancement of the sport in Associate and Affiliate nations, Rwanda received two of the six awards available: Female Participation Programme of the Year, and Associate Member Women's Performance of the Year.

In December 2020, the ICC announced the qualification pathway for the 2023 ICC Women's T20 World Cup. Rwanda were named in the 2021 ICC Women's T20 World Cup Africa Qualifier regional group, alongside ten other teams. Rwanda finished third in their group after winning three of their five matches, failing to progress to the knockout stages of the tournament.

On 20 March 2026, Fanny Utagushimaninde of Rwanda Women became the youngest player, at the age of 15 years and 223 days, to score a century in Women's Twenty20 International cricket. She achieved the record at the Tafewa Balewa Square Oval in Lagos, while playing for Rwanda Women against Ghana Women during the Nigeria Invitational Women's T20I Tournament.

== Records and statistics ==
International Match Summary — Rwanda Women

Last updated 14 November 2026

Playing Record
Format	M	W	L	T	NR	Inaugural Match
Twenty20 Internationals	141	85	53	2	1	26 January 2019

=== Twenty20 International ===
- Highest team total: 246/1 v Mali, 21 June 2019, at Gahanga International Cricket Stadium.
- Highest individual score: 114*, Marie Bimenyimana v Mali, 21 June 2019, at Gahanga International Cricket Stadium, Kigali and Gisele Ishimwe v Eswatini, 12 September 2021, at Botswana Cricket Association Oval, Gaborone.
- Best individual bowling figures: 5/3, Marie Bimenyimana v Malawi, 31 May 2024, at Gahanga B Ground, Kigali.

Most T20I runs for Rwanda Women

Player	Runs	Average	Career span
Gisele Ishimwe	2,135	19.95	2019–2026
Marie Bimenyimana	1,674	17.25	2019–2026
Henriette Ishimwe	1,476	15.70	2019–2026
Merveille Uwase	897	14.70	2022–2026
Clarisse Uwase	849	11.47	2022–2026

Most T20I wickets for Rwanda Women

Player	Wickets	Average	Career span
Henriette Ishimwe	167	11.36	2019–2026
Marie Bimenyimana	121	11.61	2019–2026
Rosine Irera	94	12.53	2023–2026
Alice Ikuzwe	86	13.96	2019–2026
Belise Murekatete	747	14.90	2019–2026

Records complete to WT20I #3070. Last updated 14 November 2026.

Opponent	M	W	L	T	NR	First match	First win
ICC Full members
Zimbabwe	3	0	3	0	0	9 May 2019	
ICC Associate members
Botswana	10	10	0	0	0	6 June 2021	6 June 2021
Brazil	4	3	0	1	0	10 June 2022	10 June 2022
Cameroon	4	4	0	0	0	31 March 2023	31 March 2023
Eswatini	1	1	0	0	0	12 September 2021	12 September 2021
Gambia	1	1	0	0	0	1 April 2022	1 April 2022
Germany	1	1	0	0	0	12 June 2022	12 June 2022
Ghana	3	3	0	0	0	28 March 2022	28 March 2022
Italy	2	1	1	0	0	18 April 2026	27 April 2026
Kenya	20	13	7	0	0	10 June 2021	19 April 2023
Lesotho	3	3	0	0	0	22 April 2024	22 April 2024
Malawi	5	5	0	0	0	31 May 2024	31 May 2024
Mali	2	2	0	0	0	18 June 2019	18 June 2019
Mozambique	4	4	0	0	0	8 May 2019	8 May 2019
Namibia	4	1	3	0	0	7 June 2021	12 November 2026
Nepal	2	0	2	0	0	22 April 2026	
Nigeria	30	16	13	1	0	26 January 2019	28 January 2019
Sierra Leone	7	7	0	0	0	30 March 2022	30 March 2022
Tanzania	11	2	9	0	0	11 May 2019	22 April 2023
Uganda	17	3	14	0	0	19 June 2019	17 June 2023
United Arab Emirates	1	0	1	0	0	21 April 2023	
United States	4	3	0	0	1	21 April 2026	21 April 2026
Vanuatu	2	2	0	0	0	19 April 2026	19 April 2026

== Current squad ==
Updated as on 26 April 2024

This lists all the players who played for Rwanda in the past 12 months or named in the most recent squad.

Name	Age	Batting style	Bowling style	Notes
Batters
Marie Bimenyimana	29	Right-handed	Right-arm medium	
Clarisse Uwase	25	Left-handed	Left-arm medium	
Gisele Ishimwe	22	Right-handed	Right-arm medium	
Merveille Uwase	21	Right-handed	-	
Shakila Niyomuhoza	20	Right-handed	-	
Cathia Uwamahoro	33	Right-handed	-	
Liliane Ufitinema	18	Right-handed	Right-arm off break	
All-rounders
Henriette Ishimwe	23	Right-handed	Right-arm medium	
Alice Ikuzwe	27	Right-handed	Right-arm medium	
Flora Irakoze	26	Right-handed	Right-arm off break	Captain & Wicket-keeper
Georgette Ingabire	24	Left-handed	Right-arm medium	
Spin Bowlers
Rosine Irera	21	Right-handed	Right-arm off break	
Marie Tumukunde	23	Left-handed	Slow left-arm orthodox	
Rosette Shimwamana	19	Right-handed	Right-arm off break	
Pace Bowlers
Belise Murekatete	22	Right-handed	Right-arm medium	
Josiane Nyirankundineza	26	Right-handed	Right-arm medium	
Immaculee Muhawenimana	27	Right-handed	Right-arm medium	
Devotha Uwizeya		Right-handed	Right-arm medium	
Nadine Nzayituriki	20	Right-handed	Right-arm medium	

== Tournament history ==
=== ICC Women's ODI World Cup ===
Women's Cricket World Cup records
Host Year	Round	Position	GP	W	L	T	NR
(England) 1973	Did not qualify/No Women's ODI status						
(India) 1978	Did not qualify/No Women's ODI status						
(New Zealand) 1982	Did not qualify/No Women's ODI status						
(Australia) 1988	Did not qualify/No Women's ODI status						
(England) 1993	Did not qualify/No Women's ODI status						
(India) 1997	Did not qualify/No Women's ODI status						
(New Zealand) 2000	Did not qualify/No Women's ODI status						
(South Africa) 2005	Did not qualify/No Women's ODI status						
(Australia) 2009	Did not qualify/No Women's ODI status						
(India) 2013	Did not qualify/No Women's ODI status						
(England) 2017	Did not qualify/No Women's ODI status						
(New Zealand) 2022	Did not qualify/No Women's ODI status						
(India) 2025	Did not qualify/No Women's ODI status						
Total	0/13	0 Titles	0	0	0	0	0

=== ICC Women's Cricket World Cup Qualifier ===
ICC Women's Cricket World Cup Qualifier records
Host Year	Round	Position	GP	W	L	T	NR
(Netherlands) 2003	Did not qualify/No ODI status						
(South Africa) 2008	Did not qualify/No ODI status						
(Bangladesh) 2011	Did not qualify/No ODI status						
(Sri Lanka) 2017	Did not qualify/No ODI status						
(Zimbabwe) 2021	Did not qualify/No ODI status						
(Pakistan) 2025	Did not qualify/No ODI status						
Total	0/6	0 Title	0	0	0	0	0

=== ICC Women's World T20 ===
Twenty20 World Cup records
Host Year	Round	Position	GP	W	L	T	NR
(England) 2009	Did not qualify						
(Cricket West Indies) 2010	Did not qualify						
(Sri Lanka) 2012	Did not qualify						
(Bangladesh) 2014	Did not qualify						
(India) 2016	Did not qualify						
(Cricket West Indies) 2018	Did not qualify						
(Australia) 2020	Did not qualify						
(South Africa) 2023	Did not qualify						
(United Arab Emirates) 2024	Did not qualify						
(England) 2026	Did not qualify						
Total	0/9	0 Titles	0	0	0	0	0

=== ICC Women's Twenty20 Global Qualifier ===
ICC Women's World Twenty20 Qualifier records
Host Year	Round	Position	GP	W	L	T	NR
(Republic of Ireland) 2013	Did not qualify						
(Thailand) 2015	Did not qualify						
(Netherlands) 2018	Did not qualify						
(Scotland) 2019	Did not qualify						
(United Arab Emirates) 2022	Did not qualify						
(United Arab Emirates) 2024	Did not qualify						
(Nepal) 2026	Did not qualify						
Total	0/7	0 Titles	0	0	0	0	0

=== ICC Women's T20 Champions Trophy ===
ICC Women's T20 Champions Trophy records
Host Year	Round	Position	GP	W	L	T	NR
(Sri Lanka) 2027	To be determined						
2031	To be determined						
Total	–	0 Title	0	0	0	0	0

=== ICC Women's T20 World Cup Africa Qualifier ===
ICC Women's T20 World Cup Africa Qualifier records
Year	Round	Position	GP	W	L	T	NR
(Zimbabwe) 2019	Group stage	–	4	2	2	0	0
(Botswana) 2021	Group stage	–	5	3	2	0	0
Total	2/2	0 Title	9	5	4	0	0

=== ICC Women's T20 World Cup Africa Qualifier Division One ===
ICC Women's T20 World Cup Africa Qualifier Division One records
Year	Round	Position	GP	W	L	T	NR
(Botswana) 2025	DNQ	5/8	5	3	2	0	0
Total	1/1	0 Title	5	3	2	0	0

=== ICC Women's T20 World Cup Africa Qualifier Division Two ===
ICC Women's T20 World Cup Africa Qualifier Division Two records
Year	Round	Position	GP	W	L	T	NR
(Uganda) 2023	Group stage	–	3	0	3	0	0
(Botswana) 2025	Champion	1/8	5	5	0	0	0
Total	2/2	1 Title	8	5	3	0	0

=== Cricket at the African Games ===
Cricket at the African Games records
Host Year	Round	Position	GP	W	L	T	NR
(Ghana) 2023	Group stage	–	3	0	3	0	0
(Egypt) 2027	To be determined						
(Democratic Republic of the Congo) 2031	To be determined						
Total	0/1	0 Title	3	0	3	0	0

== See also ==
- List of Rwanda women Twenty20 International cricketers
