= List of women's Twenty20 International records =

Women's Twenty20 International cricket records

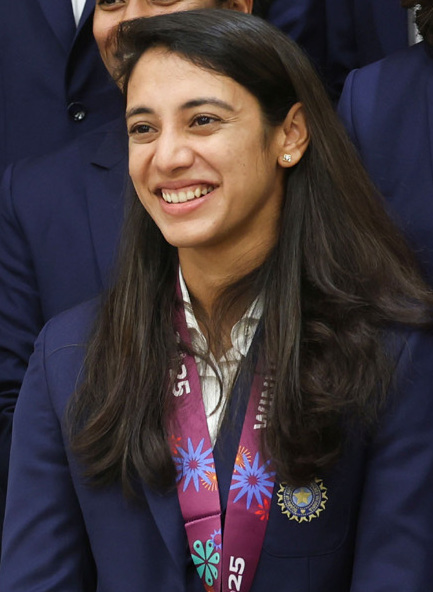
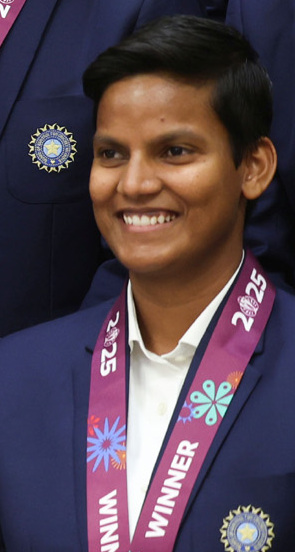
Smriti Mandhana (left) and Deepti Sharma (right) are the highest run-scorer and wicket-taker in WT20Is respectively.

A Women's Twenty20 International (WT20I) is a form of Twenty20 cricket in which each team plays a single innings with a maximum of twenty overs. The matches are played between international teams recognized by the International Cricket Council (ICC). This article contains records for WT20Is.

== Listing notation ==
Team notation

- (100/3) indicates that a team scored 100 runs for three wickets and the innings was closed, either due to a successful run chase or if no overs remained (or are able) to be bowled.
- (100) indicates that a team scored 100 runs and was all out, either by losing all ten wickets or by having one or more batters unable to bat and losing the remaining wickets.

Batting notation

- (100*) indicates a batter scored 100 runs and was not out.
- (75) indicates that a batter scored 75 runs and was out after that.

Bowling notation

- (5/40) indicates that a bowler has captured 5 wickets while giving away 40 runs.
- (19.5 overs) indicates that a team bowled 19 complete overs (each of six legal deliveries), and one incomplete over of just five deliveries.

Currently playing

- Record holders who are currently playing T20Is (i.e. their record details listed could change) are shown with a dagger (†) next to their name.

Record took place in a Women's T20 World Cup match

Women's T20 World Cup match ♠

== Team records ==
=== Result records ===
Team	Matches	Won	Lost	Tied	NR	% Won*
Argentina	48	19	28	0	1	40.42
Australia	216	152	54	4	6	73.33
Austria	69	30	39	0	0	43.47
Bahrain	40	5	33	0	2	13.15
Bangladesh	161	61	99	0	1	38.12
Barbados	3	1	2	0	0	33.33
Belgium	20	1	19	0	0	5.00
Belize	6	5	1	0	0	83.33
Bhutan	43	12	31	0	0	27.90
Botswana	83	29	53	1	0	34.93
Brazil	77	55	21	1	0	72.72
Bulgaria	31	3	28	0	0	9.67
Cambodia	16	5	11	0	0	31.25
Cameroon	33	7	26	0	0	21.21
Canada	37	13	22	0	2	37.14
Cayman Islands	4	1	3	0	0	25.00
Chile	17	4	13	0	0	23.52
China	68	30	35	2	1	46.26
Cook Islands	19	4	15	0	0	21.05
Costa Rica	16	6	9	1	0	37.50
Croatia	14	7	7	0	0	50.00
Cyprus	30	21	7	0	2	75.00
Czech Republic	31	8	23	0	0	25.80
Denmark	41	21	20	0	0	51.21
England	233	167	61	3	2	72.72
Estonia	28	8	19	0	1	29.62
Eswatini	26	0	26	0	0	0.00
Fiji	45	6	37	1	1	15.90
Finland	11	3	8	0	0	27.27
France	39	16	22	1	0	41.02
Gambia	4	0	4	0	0	0.00
Germany	72	37	34	0	1	52.11
Ghana	11	1	10	0	0	9.09
Gibraltar	16	10	6	0	0	62.50
Greece	46	20	24	0	2	43.47
Guernsey	23	20	13	0	0	40.90
Hong Kong	126	71	52	2	1	58.40
India	236	134	95	1	6	58.69
Indonesia	84	59	24	0	1	71.08
Ireland	163	78	84	0	1	48.14
Isle of Man	39	23	16	0	0	58.97
Italy	57	38	19	0	0	66.66
Japan	62	29	32	1	0	46.77
Jersey	52	34	17	0	1	66.66
Kenya	81	38	42	1	0	48.14
Kuwait	63	21	40	0	2	34.42
Lesotho	28	3	25	0	0	10.71
Luxembourg	25	11	14	0	0	44.44
Malawi	49	18	31	0	0	36.73
Malaysia	122	51	69	1	1	42.14
Maldives	6	0	6	0	0	0.00
Mali	6	0	6	0	0	0.00
Malta	25	7	18	0	0	28.00
Mexico	20	6	13	1	0	35.00
Mongolia	28	1	27	0	0	3.57
Mozambique	58	24	34	0	0	41.37
Myanmar	57	31	25	0	1	55.35
Namibia	131	70	59	1	1	54.61
Nepal	102	59	42	0	1	58.41
Netherlands	121	56	59	2	4	47.86
New Zealand	207	110	89	3	5	55.44
Nigeria	93	49	42	1	1	53.80
Norway	45	15	30	0	0	33.33
Oman	53	30	22	0	1	57.69
Pakistan	211	85	118	3	5	41.26
Papua New Guinea	82	51	28	1	2	65.00
Peru	7	0	7	0	0	0.00
Philippines	38	6	31	0	1	16.21
Portugal	9	6	3	0	0	66.66
Qatar	53	14	39	0	0	26.41
Romania	27	9	18	0	0	33.33
Rwanda	141	85	53	2	1	61.07
Samoa	47	23	22	0	2	51.11
Saudi Arabia	14	0	13	0	1	0.00
Scotland	95	55	39	1	0	58.94
Serbia	29	11	18	0	0	37.93
Sierra Leone	58	27	31	0	0	46.55
Singapore	77	18	56	0	3	24.32
South Africa	199	93	99	0	7	48.43
South Korea	12	2	10	0	0	16.66
Spain	28	15	12	0	1	55.55
Sri Lanka	196	81	109	0	6	42.63
Sweden	41	27	13	0	1	67.50
Switzerland	27	14	13	0	0	51.85
Tanzania	84	52	29	0	3	64.19
Thailand	152	99	51	0	2	66.00
Turkey	17	10	7	0	0	58.82
Uganda	141	88	52	1	0	62.41
United Arab Emirates	128	80	45	1	2	64.28
United States	67	33	33	0	1	50.00
Vanuatu	61	33	26	0	2	55.93
West Indies	209	104	94	6	5	52.94
Zambia	7	0	7	0	0	0.00
Zimbabwe	109	57	51	1	0	52.29

*The win percentage excludes no results and counts ties as half a win if there was no tiebreaker (otherwise the tiebreker determines a win or loss).
Last updated: 22 November 2026

==== Most consecutive wins ====
Wins	Team	First win	Last win
17	Thailand	United Arab Emirates at Sportpark Maarschalkerweerd, Utrecht on 12 July 2018	Netherlands at Sportpark Het Schootsveld, Deventer on 10 August 2019
16	Australia	South Africa at Sylhet International Cricket Stadium, Sylhet on 25 March 2014	Ireland at YMCA Cricket Club, Dublin on 22 August 2015
16	Italy	Germany at Bayer Uerdingen Cricket Ground, Krefeld on 26 July 2024	Spain at Roma Cricket Ground, Rome on 29 May 2025
16	United Arab Emirates	Uganda at Asian Institute of Technology Ground, Bangkok on 25 November 2025	Hong Kong at Bayuemas Oval, Pandamaran on 12 June 2026
16	Brazil	Cameroon at Gahanga International Cricket Stadium, Kigali on 11 June 2025	Malawi at Gahanga B Ground, Kigali on 12 June 2026
No results are treated the same as losses and ties in the above table. A no result occurs when a match is abandoned partway through, usually due to rain. * indicates an ongoing streak Last updated: 12 June 2026

==== Most consecutive defeats ====
Defeats	Team	First loss	Last loss
26*	Eswatini	Botswana at Botswana Cricket Association Oval 1, Gaborone on 9 September 2021	Lesotho at Botswana Cricket Association Oval 2, Gaborone on 26 July 2025
26	Mongolia	Indonesia at Zhejiang University of Technology Cricket Field, Hangzhou on 19 September 2023	Japan at Bayuemas Oval, Pandamaran on 4 June 2026
24	Zimbabwe	United Arab Emirates at Queens Sports Club, Bulawayo on 5 October 2025	Bangladesh at Seven Districts Sports Club, Ajman on 13 November 2026
20	Bulgaria	Serbia at Lisicji Jarak Cricket Ground, Belgrade on 12 October 2024	Serbia at Vasil Levski National Sports Academy, Sofia on 26 June 2026
20	Lesotho	Botswana at Botswana Cricket Association Oval 1, Gaborone on 20 August 2018	Mozambique at Botswana Cricket Association Oval 2, Gaborone on 24 July 2025
No results are treated the same as losses and ties in the above table. A no result occurs when a match is abandoned partway through, usually due to rain. * indicates an ongoing streak Updated: 15 November 2026

=== Scoring records ===
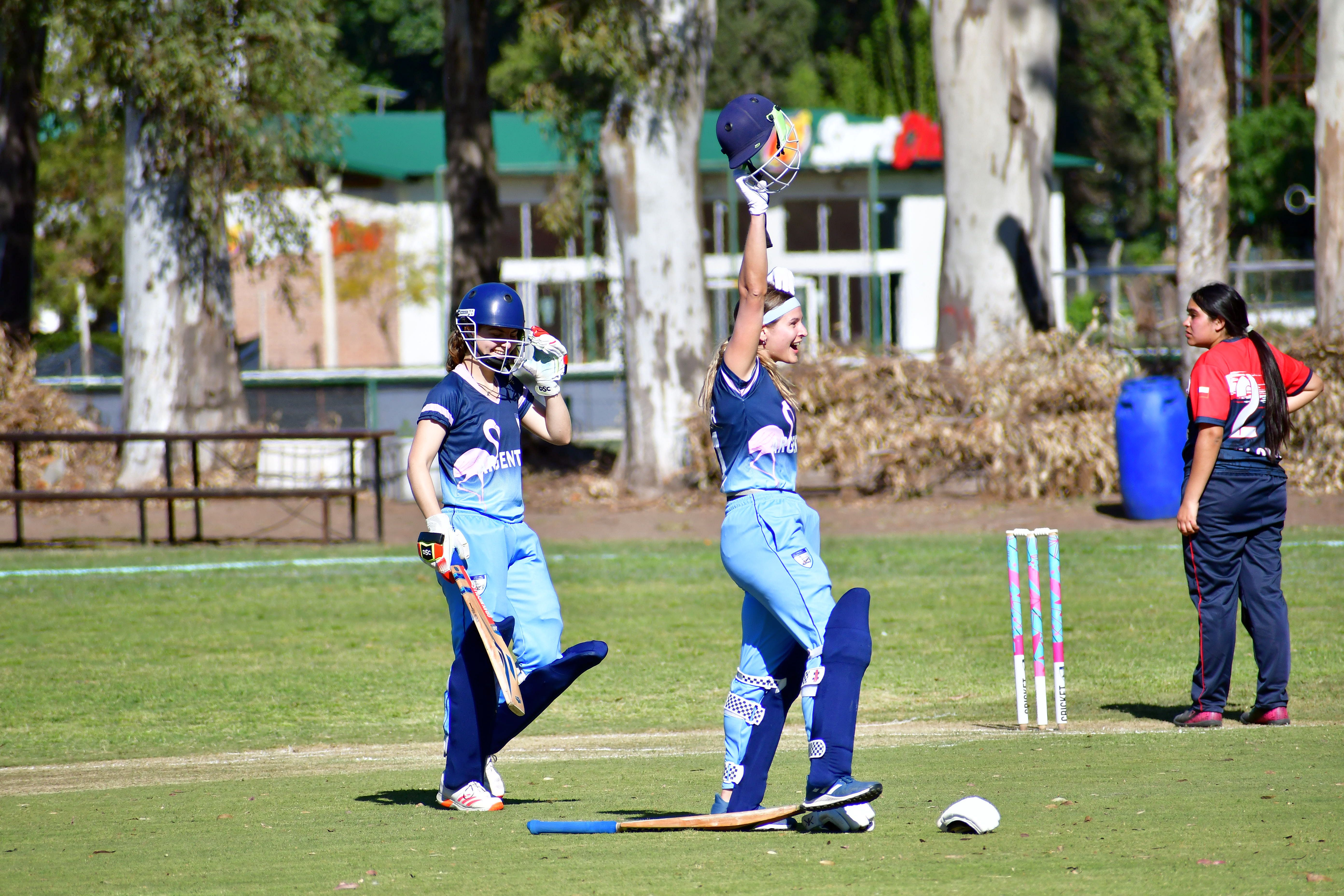
Albertina Galan and Lucia Taylor during the match that set the record of highest score in women's T20 internationals.

==== Highest innings totals ====
Score	Batting team	Opposition	Venue	Date	Ref.
427/1 (20.0 overs)	Argentina	Chile	St Albans Club, Buenos Aires	13 October 2023	
333/1 (20.0 overs)	Argentina	Chile	St Albans Club, Buenos Aires	15 October 2023	
318/1 (20.0 overs)	Bahrain	Saudi Arabia	Oman Cricket Academy Ground Turf 2, Muscat	22 March 2022	
314/2 (20.0 overs)	Uganda	Mali	Gahanga International Cricket Stadium, Kigali	20 June 2019	
300/6 (20.0 overs)	Argentina	Chile	St Albans Club, Buenos Aires	14 October 2023	
Last updated: 15 October 2023.

==== Highest successful chases ====
Score	Target	Batting team	Opposition	Venue	Date	Ref.
213/3 (19.5 overs)	213	West Indies	Australia	North Sydney Oval, Sydney	2 October 2023	
199/3 (18.4 overs)	199	England	India	Brabourne Stadium, Mumbai	25 March 2018	
193/1 (16.3 overs)	193	South Africa	India	Wanderers Stadium, Johannesburg	22 April 2026	
190/2 (17.4 overs)	190	Spain	Switzerland	Embrach Cricket Ground, Embrach	28 July 2026	
185/5 (20 overs)	181	South Africa	Pakistan	JB Marks Oval, Potchefstroom	10 February 2026	
184/4 (18.3 overs)	181	England	India	County Ground, Taunton	2 June 2026	
Last updated: 28 July 2026

==== Lowest innings totals ====
Score	Batting team	Opposition	Venue	Date	Ref.
6 (12.1 overs)	Maldives	Bangladesh	Pokhara Rangasala, Pokhara	5 December 2019	
6 (9.0 overs)	Mali	Rwanda	Rwanda Cricket Stadium, Kigali	18 June 2019	
8 (11.3 overs)	Maldives	Nepal	Pokhara Rangasala, Pokhara	7 December 2019	
8 (9.1 overs)	China	Thailand	Mission Road Ground, Mong Kok	7 December 2024	
9 (11.1 overs)	Philippines	Thailand	AZ Group Cricket Oval, Phnom Penh	1 May 2023	
Qualification: Only completed innings are included. Innings with reduced number of overs are excluded unless the team was bowled out. Last updated: 9 December 2024.

==== Lowest total defended successfully ====
Total	Defended by	Opposition	Venue	Date	Ref.
53	Thailand	Malaysia (41 in 15.3 overs)	AZ Group Cricket Oval, Phnom Penh	4 May 2023	
59	Tanzania	Rwanda (43 in 17.2 overs)	Gahanga International Cricket Stadium, Kigali	13 June 2025	
62	Bangladesh	Sri Lanka (57 in 19.4 overs)	Guanggong International Cricket Stadium, Guangzhou	28 October 2012	
66	Rwanda	Botswana (46 in 19.5 overs)	Rwanda Cricket Stadium, Kigali	10 June 2023	
68	Namibia	Uganda (40 in 12.1 overs)	Centre for Cricket Development Ground, Windhoek	23 April 2022	
Qualification: Only completed innings in matches that did not have overs reduced are included. Last updated: 13 June 2025

==== Highest margin of victory (by runs) ====
Margin	Teams	Venue	Date	Ref
364 runs	Argentina (427/1) beat Chile (63)	St Albans Club, Buenos Aires	13 October 2023	
311 runs	Argentina (333/1) beat Chile (22)	St Albans Club, Buenos Aires	15 October 2023	
304 runs	Uganda (314/2) beat Mali (10)	Gahanga International Cricket Stadium, Kigali	20 June 2019	
281 runs	Argentina (300/6) beat Chile (19)	St Albans Club, Buenos Aires	14 October 2023	
269 runs	Bahrain (318/1) beat Saudi Arabia (49/8)	Oman Cricket Academy Ground Turf 2, Muscat	22 March 2022	
Last updated: 15 October 2023.

==== Highest margin of victory (by balls remaining) ====
Balls Remaining	Teams	Venue	Date	Ref
116 balls	Rwanda (8/0) beat Mali (6)	Gahanga International Cricket Stadium, Kigali	18 June 2019	
116 balls	Tanzania (14/0) beat Mali (11)	Gahanga International Cricket Stadium, Kigali	19 June 2019	
116 balls	Thailand (10/0) beat Philippines (9)	AZ Group Cricket Oval, Phnom Penh	1 May 2023	
115 balls	Nepal (17/0) beat Maldives (16)	Pokhara Stadium, Pokhara	2 December 2019	
115 balls	United Arab Emirates (30/0) beat Saudi Arabia (27)	UKM-YSD Cricket Oval, Bangi	3 June 2026	
Last updated: 3 June 2026.

==== Highest margin of victory (by wickets remaining) ====
As of October 2026, a total of 155 matches have been won by a margin of 10 wickets.

==== Smallest margin of victory (by runs) ====
As of June 2026, 23 matches have been won by a margin of 1 run. The records are ordered by the date of the match.

Teams	Venue	Date	Ref.
Australia (108/9) beat New Zealand (107/7)	Gardens Oval, Darwin	19 July 2007	
Sri Lanka (108) beat Pakistan (107) ♠	Warner Park, Basseterre	6 May 2010	
West Indies (90/8) beat Pakistan (56/3)^{[a]}	Progress Park, Grenada	6 September 2011	
Pakistan (98/9) beat India (97/8) ♠	Galle International Stadium, Galle	1 October 2012	
Pakistan (116/8) beat England (115)	Haslegrave Ground, Loughborough	5 July 2013	
New Zealand (134/7) beat West Indies (133/7)	Pukekura Park, New Plymouth	20 March 2018	
England (119/6) beat India (118/6)	Barsapara Stadium, Guwahati	9 March 2019	
Nigeria (152/6) beat Rwanda (151)	Gahanga International Cricket Stadium, Kigali	6 September 2019	
Italy (99/5) beat Austria (98/8)	Roma Cricket Ground, Spinaceto	12 August 2021	
Brazil (48/7) beat Canada (47)	Reforma Athletic Club, Naucalpan	25 October 2021	
West Indies (115) beat New Zealand (114/9)	Sir Vivian Richards Stadium, Antigua	28 September 2022	
Sri Lanka (122/6) beat Pakistan (121/6)	Sylhet International Cricket Stadium, Sylhet	13 October 2022	
Samoa (109/9) beat Cook Islands (108/9)	Lloyd Elsmore Park 2, Auckland	17 January 2024	
West Indies (122/9) beat Pakistan (121/8)	National Stadium, Karachi	26 April 2024	
Uganda (71/6) beat Namibia (70/9)	Entebbe Cricket Oval, Entebbe	10 March 2025	
Argentina (95/4) beat Canada (94)	Club San Albano, Buenos Aires	12 March 2025	
Namibia (126/6) beat Uganda (125)	High Performance Oval, Windhoek	14 April 2025	
Zimbabwe (136/5) beat United States (135/6)	Grand Prairie Stadium, Dallas	27 April 2025	
Tanzania (121/7) beat Uganda (120/5)	High Performance Oval, Windhoek	31 August 2025	
Papua New Guinea (94/7) beat Namibia (93/7)	Asian Institute of Technology Ground, Bangkok	28 November 2025	
Thailand (115/7) beat Zimbabwe (114/6)	Mulpani International Cricket Ground, Kageshwari-Manohara	20 January 2026	
Rwanda (127/4) beat United States (126/5)	Gahanga International Cricket Stadium, Kigali	21 April 2026	
Ireland (99/5) beat West Indies (141/8)	Castle Avenue, Clontarf	1 June 2026	
Last updated: 1 June 2026^[a] Rain interrupted play in Pakistan women's innings and the reduced target after 11 overs was 58.

==== Smallest margin of victory (by wickets) ====
As of 11 November 2026, 22 matches have been won by 1 wicket.

Teams	Venue	Date	Ref.
England (109/9) beat West Indies (108/4) ♠	Himachal Pradesh Cricket Association Stadium, Dharamsala	24 March 2016	
Pakistan (131/9) beat Sri Lanka (129/6)	Singhalese Sports Club Cricket Ground, Colombo	28 March 2018	
China (87/9) beat Hong Kong (86/8)	Terdthai Cricket Ground, Bangkok	19 February 2019	
Rwanda (138/9) beat Mozambique (137/6)	Old Hararians, Harare	8 May 2019	
Samoa (88/9) beat Vanuatu (87/7)	Faleata Oval, Apia	9 July 2019	
Qatar (119/9) beat Kuwait (115/7)	West End Park International Cricket Stadium, Doha	17 January 2020	
Zimbabwe (107/9) beat Thailand (104/4)	Takashinga Cricket Club, Highfield, Harare	27 August 2021	
Uganda (102/9) beat Nepal (101/7)	Tribhuvan University International Cricket Ground, Kirtipur	17 May 2022	
Hong Kong (140/9) beat United Arab Emirates (139/5)	United Ground, Windhoek	26 April 2023	
Tanzania (107/9) beat Namibia (103/8)	Achimota Oval A, Accra	10 March 2024	
Mexico (93/9) beat Cayman Islands (92/8)	Pocos Oval, Poços de Caldas	27 September 2024	
Kuwait (86/9) beat Singapore (85)	National Stadium, Singapore	26 October 2024	
Netherlands (110/9) beat Thailand (109/5)	Tribhuvan University International Cricket Ground, Kirtipur	6 February 2025	
Nepal (76/9) beat Uganda (74)	Entebbe Cricket Oval, Entebbe	9 March 2025	
Greece (123/9) beat Serbia (122)	Vasil Levski National Sports Academy, Sofia	8 July 2025	
Norway (67/9) beat Finland (66)	Ishoj Cricket Club, Ishøj	30 August 2025	
Estonia (108/9) beat Czech Republic (107/6)	Estonian National Cricket and Rugby Ground, Tallinn	6 September 2025	
Myanmar (55/9) beat China (53)	Zhejiang University of Technology Cricket Field, Hangzhou	22 September 2025	
Norway (92/9) beat Austria (91)	Moara Vlasei Cricket Ground, Ilfov County	12 October 2025	
Malawi (92/9) beat Mozambique (91/8)	Botswana Cricket Association Oval 2, Gaborone	11 April 2026	
Argentina (75/9) beat Canada (74/4)	St. George's College Ground, Quilmes	29 July 2026	
United States (97/9) beat Namibia (96/9)	Entebbe Cricket Oval, Entebbe	11 November 2026	
Last updated: 11 November 2026.

==== Highest aggregate runs in a single match ====
Runs	Teams	Venue	Date	Ref
490	Argentina (427/1) v Chile (63)	St Albans Club, Buenos Aires	13 October 2023	
425	Australia (212/6) v West Indies (213/3)	North Sydney Oval, Sydney	2 October 2023	
412	India (221/2) v Sri Lanka (191/6)	The Sports Hub, Thiruvananthapuram	28 December 2025	
401	Spain (208/4) v Switzerland (193/7)	Embrach Cricket Ground, Embrach	31 July 2026	
399	Brazil (243/3) v Jersey (156/7)	Embrach Cricket Ground, Embrach	28 July 2026	
Last updated: 31 July 2026

==== Lowest aggregate runs in a single match ====
Runs	Teams	Venue	Date	Scorecard
14	Rwanda (8/0) v Mali (6)	Gahanga International Cricket Stadium, Kigali	18 June 2019	
17	Nepal (9/0) v Maldives (8)	Pokhara Stadium, Pokhara	7 December 2019	
19	Philippines (9) v Thailand (10/0)	AZ Group Cricket Oval, Phnom Penh	1 May 2023	
23	Greece (12/0) v Serbia (11)	Marina Ground, Corfu	7 September 2023	
25	Mali (11) v Tanzania (14/0)	Gahanga International Cricket Stadium, Kigali	19 June 2019	
25	Argentina (12) v Brazil (13/2)	Reforma Athletic Club, Naucalpan	19 October 2021	
Last updated: 7 September 2023.

== Batting records ==
=== Most career runs ===
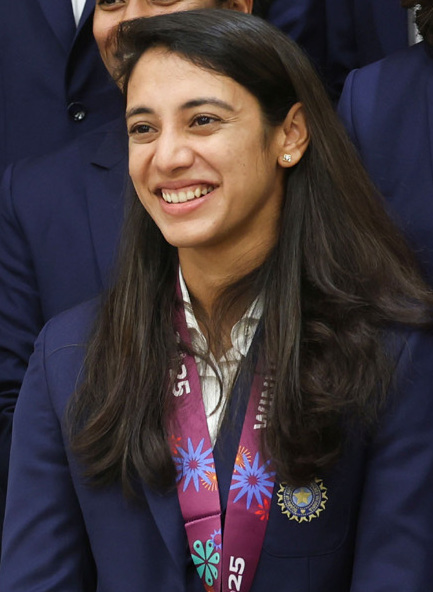
Smriti Mandhana is the player to have scored the most runs in her T20 career than any other.

Rank	Runs	Batter	Innings	Average	100s	50s	T20I career span
1	4,923	(India) Smriti Mandhana†	174	31.15	2	37	2013–2026
2	4,758	(New Zealand) Suzie Bates	178	28.83	1	28	2007–2026
3	4,438	(India) Harmanpreet Kaur†	190	30.60	1	19	2009–2026
4	4,311	(Sri Lanka) Chamari Athapaththu†	170	27.11	4	16	2009–2026
5	3,860	(Australia) Beth Mooney†	121	41.50	2	31	2006–2026
Last updated: 20 October 2026

=== Most runs in each batting position ===
Batting Position	Batter	Innings	Runs	Span	Ref
Opener	(India) Smriti Mandhana†	165	4,802	2013–2026	
Number 3	(India) Jemimah Rodrigues†	82	2,076	2018–2026	
Number 4	(India) Harmanpreet Kaur†	132	3,244	2009–2026	
Number 5	(England) Heather Knight†	52	1,017	2016–2026	
Number 6	(Pakistan) Aliya Riaz†	42	633	2015–2026	
Number 7	(Pakistan) Fatima Sana†	18	334	2022–2026	
Number 8	(Pakistan) Fatima Sana†	12	249	2019–2026	
Number 9	(England) Sophie Ecclestone†	16	97	2017–2026	
Number 10	(Rwanda) Rosine Irera†	20	71	2023–2026	
Number 11	(Namibia) Victoria Hamunyela†	19	40	2019–2025	
Last updated: 18 November 2026

=== Most runs in a calendar year ===
Rank	Runs	Batter	Innings	Year
1	991	(India) Shafali Verma	27	2026
2	824	(South Africa) Laura Wolvaardt	24	2026
1	821	(India) Smriti Mandhana	23	2026
4	800	(Hong Kong) Natasha Miles	27	2026
5	779	(United Arab Emirates) Esha Oza	22	2025
5	779	(Hong Kong) Yasmin Daswani	22	2026
Last updated: 20 October 2026

=== Fastest to multiples of 1,000 runs ===
Runs	Player	Team	Innings	Record Date	Ref
1,000	Rebecca Blake	Romania	17	11 October 2025	
2,000	Sterre Kalis	Netherlands	67	20 June 2026	
2,000	Beth Mooney	Australia	67	11 December 2022	
3,000	Beth Mooney	Australia	100	17 October 2024	
4,000	Suzie Bates	New Zealand	146	15 October 2023	
Last updated: 20 June 2026

=== Most 50+ scores ===
Rank	50+	Player	Innings	100s	50s	Span
1	39	(India) Smriti Mandhana†	174	2	37	2013–2026
2	33	(Australia) Beth Mooney†	121	2	31	2016–2026
3	29	(New Zealand) Suzie Bates	178	1	28	2007–2026
4	26	(England) Danni Wyatt-Hodge†	166	3	23	2010–2026
5	25	(New Zealand) Sophie Devine	154	1	24	2006–2026
Last updated: 22 September 2026

=== Fastest 50 ===
Balls	Batter	Opposition	Venue	Date	Scorecard
15	(Pakistan) Fatima Sana	Zimbabwe	National Stadium, Karachi	15 May 2026	
16	(Sweden) Anya Vaidya	Bulgaria	Moara Vlasiei Cricket Ground, Ilfov County	15 October 2026	
18	(New Zealand) Sophie Devine	India	M. Chinnaswamy Stadium, Bengaluru	11 July 2015	
18	(Australia) Phoebe Litchfield	West Indies	North Sydney Oval, Sydney	2 October 2023	
18	(India) Richa Ghosh	West Indies	DY Patil Stadium, Navi Mumbai	19 December 2024	
Updated: 15 October 2026

=== Fastest 100 ===
Balls	Batter	Opposition	Venue	Date	Scorecard
38 ♠	(Cricket West Indies) Deandra Dottin	South Africa	Warner Park, Basseterre	5 May 2010	
43	(Bahrain) Deepika Rasangika	Saudi Arabia	Al Amerat Cricket Stadium, Muscat	22 March 2022	
46	(Australia) Alyssa Healy	Sri Lanka	North Sydney Oval, Sydney	2 October 2019	
46	(Spain) Hillman-Bermejo	Switzerland	Embrach Cricket Ground, Embrach	31 July 2026	
47	(England) Tammy Beaumont	South Africa	County Ground, Taunton	20 June 2018	
47	(South Africa) Laura Wolvaardt	India	Wanderers Stadium, Johannesburg	22 April 2026	
47	(Pakistan) Ayesha Zafar	Zimbabwe	National Stadium, Karachi	12 May 2026	
Last updated: 31 July 2026

=== Highest individual score ===
Runs	Batter	Balls Faced	Opposition	Venue	Date	Ref
169	(Argentina) Lucia Taylor	84	Chile	St. Albans Club, Buenos Aires	13 October 2023	
161*	(Bahrain) Deepika Rasangika	66	Saudi Arabia	Oman Cricket Academy Ground Turf 2, Muscat	22 March 2022	
158*	(United Arab Emirates) Esha Oza	71	Bahrain	Oman Cricket Academy Ground Turf 2, Muscat	26 March 2022	
155*	(Argentina) Maria Castiñeiras	77	Chile	St Albans Club, Buenos Aires	15 October 2023	
148*	(Australia) Alyssa Healy	61	Sri Lanka	North Sydney Oval, Sydney	2 October 2019	
148*	(Thailand) Natthakan Chantham	69	Singapore	Terdthai Cricket Ground, Bangkok	16 December 2025	
Last updated: 16 December 2025

=== Highest individual score (by batting position) ===
Position	Player	Runs	Balls Faced	Opposition	Venue	Date	Ref
Openers	(Argentina) Lucia Taylor	169	84	Chile	St Albans Club, Buenos Aires	13 October 2023	
Position 3	(Bahrain) Deepika Rasangika	161*	66	Saudi Arabia	Oman Cricket Academy Ground Turf 2, Muscat	22 March 2022	
Position 4	(Nepal) Rubina Chhetry	118*	59	Maldives	UKM-YSD Cricket Oval, Bangi	13 February 2024	
Position 5	(India) Harmanpreet Kaur ♠	103	51	New Zealand	Providence Stadium, Georgetown	9 November 2018	
Position 6	(Cricket West Indies) Deandra Dottin ♠	112*	45	South Africa	Warner Park Sporting Complex, Basseterre	5 May 2010	
Position 7	(Singapore) Roshni Seth	57*	39	Kuwait	Selangor Turf Club, Kuala Lumpur	6 June 2026	
Position 8	(Pakistan) Fatima Sana	90	41	South Africa	JB Marks Oval, Potchefstroom	10 February 2026	
Position 9	(Austria) Andrea-Mae Zepeda	49*	35	Czech Republic	Seebarn Cricket Ground, Harmannsdorf	9 June 2024	
Position 10	(Namibia) Anneri van Schoor	39*	30	Botswana	United Ground, Windhoek	3 April 2019	
Position 11	(Samoa) Florence Agaimalo	21*	11	Vanuatu	Vanuatu Cricket Ground, Port Vila	3 October 2022	
Last updated: 6 June 2026

=== Highest career average ===
Rank	Average	Batter	Innings	Runs	Not outs	Span
1	153.00	(Romania) Rebecca Blake†	20	1,224	12	2022–2026
2	58.00	(Switzerland) Meghna Rajan†	21	812	7	2021–2026
3	56.88	(Isle of Man) Lucy Barnett†	37	1,479	11	2022–2026
4	47.46	(Cyprus) Iresha Chathurani†	25	712	10	2024–2026
5	43.90	(Oman) Jayadhanyha Gunasekar†	27	922	6	2025–2026
Qualification: 20 innings Last updated: 30 August 2026

=== Highest average in each batting position ===
Position	Batter	Innings	Runs	Average	Period	Ref
Opener	(Romania) Rebecca Blake†	19	1,204	150.50	2022–2026	
Number 3	(Spain) Hillman-Bermejo†	10	372	62.00	2015–2026	
Number 4	(Thailand) Natthakan Chantham†	18	433	43.30	2024–2025	
Number 5	(Brazil) Roberta Moretti Avery†	11	247	35.28	2018–2026	
Number 6	(Australia) Rachael Haynes	17	245	49.00	2010–2020	
Number 7	(Australia) Alyssa Healy	10	184	46.00	2010–2016	
Number 8	(Pakistan) Fatima Sana†	12	249	35.57	2019–2026	
Number 9	(Cricket West Indies) Anisa Mohammed	13	59	19.66	2008–2021	
Number 10	(Rwanda) Rosine Irera†	20	71	14.20	2023–2026	
Number 11	(United Arab Emirates) Suraksha Kotte†	10	22	11.00	2019–2026	
Qualification: 10 innings. Last updated: 18 November 2026

=== Highest career strike rate ===
Rank	Strike rate	Batter	Runs	Balls faced	Period
1	145.00	(Isle of Man) Lucy Barnett†	1,479	1,020	2022–2026
2	144.57	(India) Richa Ghosh†	1,453	1,005	2020–2026
3	142.56	(India) Shafali Verma†	3,453	2,422	2021–2026
4	138.01	(Jersey) Grace Wetherall†	766	555	2019–2026
5	134.22	(Pakistan) Fatima Sana†	957	713	2019–2026
Qualification: 500 balls. Last updated: 20 October 2026

=== Most career ducks ===
Rank	Ducks	Batter	Innings	Period
1	23	(England) Danni Wyatt-Hodge†	166	2010–2026
2	20	(Malaysia) Winifred Duraisingam†	101	2018–2026
3	17	(Namibia) Jurriene Diergaardt†	104	2018-2026
3	17	(Namibia) Kayleen Green†	109	2018–2026
5	16	(Rwanda) Clarisse Uwase †	86	2022–2026
Last updated: 18 November 2026

=== No ducks in career ===
Rank	Innings	Batter	Period
1	121	(United Arab Emirates) Esha Oza†	2018–2026
2	42	(New Zealand) Katie Perkins	2012–2020
3	37	(Isle of Man) Lucy Barnett†	2022–2026
4	33	(Australia) Phoebe Litchfield†	2022–2026
5	30	(Jersey) Chloe Greechan†	2019–2026
Last updated: 18 November 2026

== Bowling records ==
=== Most wickets in career ===
Rank	Wickets	Bowler	Innings	Span
1	191	(India) Deepti Sharma†	157	2016–2026
2	174	(Thailand) Thipatcha Putthawong†	111	2019–2026
3	167	(Rwanda) Henriette Ishimwe†	135	2019–2026
4	159	(Thailand) Onnicha Kamchomphu †	133	2018–2026
5	155	(Hong Kong) Kary Chan†	116	2019–2026
Last updated: 18 November 2026

=== Most wickets in a calendar year ===
Rank	Wickets	Bowler	Matches	Year
1	56	(Thailand) Thipatcha Putthawong	27	2025
2	50	(Rwanda) Henriette Ishimwe	33	2024
3	49	(India) Shree Charani	25	2026
4	43	(Thailand) Thipatcha Putthawong	28	2026
5	43	(Rwanda) Marie Bimenyimana	32	2024
Last updated: 18 November 2026

=== Best figures in a match ===
Figures	Bowler	Opposition	Venue	Date	Scorecard
9/4 (3 overs)	(Brazil) Laura Cardoso	Lesotho	Botswana Cricket Association Oval 2, Gaborone	9 April 2026	
7/0 (3.2 overs)	(Indonesia) Rohmalia Rohmalia	Mongolia	Udayana Cricket Ground, Jimbaran	24 April 2024	
7/3 (4.0 overs)	(Netherlands) Frederique Overdijk	France	La Manga Club, Cartagena	26 August 2021	
7/3 (3.4 overs)	(Argentina) Alison Stocks	Peru	Sao Fernando Polo and Cricket Club, Itaguaí	14 October 2022	
7/5 (3.3 overs)	(Sri Lanka) Chamari Athapaththu	Indonesia	Dubai International Cricket Stadium, Dubai	2 September 2026	
Updated: 2 September 2026

=== Most four-wickets-in-an-innings (and over) in a career ===
Rank	4+ hauls	Innings	Bowler	Span
1	9	111	(Thailand) Thipatcha Putthawong†	2019–2026
1	9	135	(Rwanda) Henriette Ishimwe†	2019–2026
3	7	113	(Cricket West Indies) Anisa Mohammed	2008–2021
3	7	116	(Hong Kong) Kary Chan†	2019–2026
4	6	65	(Kenya) Queentor Abel†	2019–2025
4	6	99	(Thailand) Nattaya Boochatham	2018–2025
4	6	105	(Uganda) Janet Mbabazi†	2018–2026
4	6	133	(Thailand) Onnicha Kamchomphu †	2018–2026
Updated: 18 November 2026

=== Best career averages ===
Rank	Average	Bowler	Wickets	Runs conceded	Span
1	7.81	(China) Mengting Liu†	53	414	2023–2025
2	7.90	(Indonesia) Ni Wayan Sariani†	73	577	2019–2025
3	9.52	(Samoa) Lagi Telea	40	381	2019–2024
4	9.54	(Thailand) Thipatcha Putthawong†	173	1,652	2019–2026
5	10.07	(Jersey) Chloe Greechan†	64	645	2019–2026
Qualification: 500 balls bowled. Updated: 13 November 2026

=== Best economy rate ===
Rank	Economy rate	Bowler	Runs	Overs bowled	Span
1	3.26	(Brazil) Renata de Sousa†	407	124.3	2018–2023
2	3.49	(Jersey) Chloe Greechan†	645	184.3	2019–2026
3	3.49	(Indonesia) Ni Wayan Sariani†	577	165.0	2019–2025
4	3.55	(Indonesia) Ni Made Putri Suwandewi†	745	209.5	2019–2026
5	3.55	(Rwanda) Rosette Shimwamana†	332	93.3	2024–2026
Qualification: 500 balls bowled. Updated: 4 September 2026

=== Best strike rate ===
Rank	Strike rate	Bowler	Wickets	Balls bowled	Span
1	11.66	(China) Mengting Liu†	53	618	2023–2025
2	12.29	(India) Shree Charani†	64	787	2025–2026
3	12.67	(Samoa) Lagi Telea†	40	507	2019–2024
4	13.56	(Indonesia) Ni Wayan Sariani†	73	990	2019–2025
4	13.71	(Thailand) Thipatcha Putthawong†	173	2,372	2019–2026
Qualification: 500 balls bowled. Updated: 13 November 2026

=== Best strike rate in an innings ===
Strike rate	Bowler	Wickets	Balls bowled	Opposition	Venue	Date	Ref
1.50	(Rwanda) Margueritte Vumiliya	4	6	Eswatini	Botswana Cricket Association Oval, Gaborone	12 September 2021	
1.50	(Vanuatu) Selina Solman	4	6	France	N'Du Stadium, Nouméa	11 March 2025	
2.00	(Brazil) Laura Cardoso	9	18	Lesotho	Botswana Cricket Association Oval 2, Gaborone	9 April 2026	
2.00	(Papua New Guinea) Hollan Doriga	5	10	Fiji	Vanuatu Cricket Ground, Port Vila	3 October 2022	
2.00	(Hong Kong) Mariko Hill	5	10	Tanzania	Hong Kong Cricket Club, Wong Nai Chung Gap	19 November 2023	
Qualification: minimum 4 wickets. Last updated: 9 April 2026

=== Most maiden overs ===
Maidens	Bowler	Overs	Innings	Career span
39	(Thailand) Thipatcha Putthawong	395.2	110	2019–2026
37	(Uganda) Concy Aweko	475.3	127	2018–2026
29	(Botswana) Tuelo Shadrack	246.0	73	2018–2026
27	(Indonesia) Ni Made Putri Suwandewi	209.5	67	2019–2026
26	(Thailand) Chanida Sutthiruang	328.4	119	2018–2026
26	(Namibia) Wilka Mwatile	373.4	110	2018–2026
Last updated: 13 November 2026

=== Most runs conceded in an innings ===
Runs	Bowler	Opposition	Venue	Date	Scorecard
92 (4.0 overs)	(Chile) Constanza Oyarce	Argentina	St Albans Club, Buenos Aires	13 October 2023	
86 (4.0 overs)	(Chile) Constanza Oyarce	Argentina	St Albans Club, Buenos Aires	14 October 2023	
83 (3.0 overs)	(Chile) Emilia Toro	Argentina	St Albans Club, Buenos Aires	13 October 2023	
82 (3.0 overs)	(Mali) Oumou Sow	Uganda	Gahanga International Cricket Stadium, Kigali	20 June 2019	
78 (4.0 overs)	(Chile) Camila Valdes	Argentina	St Albans Club, Buenos Aires	13 October 2023	
Updated: 14 October 2023.

== Individual records (fielding) ==
=== Most catches in T20I career ===
Catches	Fielder	Innings	T20I career span
98	(New Zealand) Suzie Bates	184	2007–2026
81	(India) Harmanpreet Kaur	211	2009–2026
75	(England) Nat Sciver-Brunt	140	2013–2026
58	(England) Jenny Gunn	104	2004–2018
57	(Sri Lanka) Nilakshi de Silva	128	2013–2026
The list excludes catches made as wicket-keeper. Last updated: 18 November 2026

== Individual records (wicket-keeper) ==
=== Most dismissals in career ===
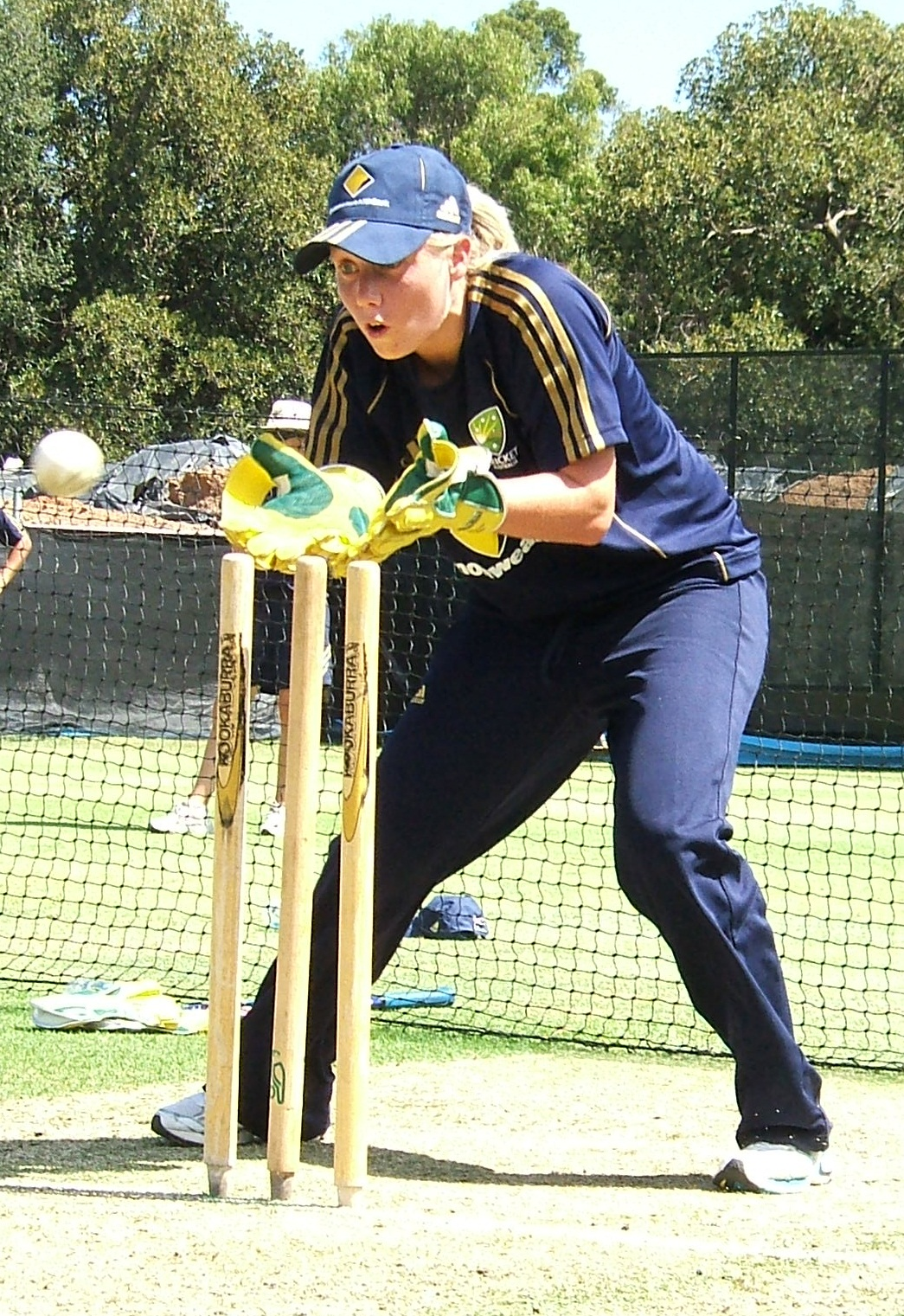
Australia's Alyssa Healy is the most successful wicketkeeper in T20Is.

Dismissals	Player	Innings	Catches	Stumpings	T20I career span
126	(Australia) Alyssa Healy	146	63	63	2010–2024
104	(Thailand) Nannapat Koncharoenkai	133	40	64	2018–2026
96	(India) Richa Ghosh	93	51	45	2021–2026
95	(England) Amy Jones	121	51	44	2013–2026
93	(Netherlands) Babette de Leede	102	55	38	2018–2026
Innings refers to when the player was the designated keeper. All figures exclude catches not made as a wicketkeeper. Last updated: 18 November 2026

=== Most catches in career ===
Catches	Wicket-keeper	Innings	T20I career span
63	(Australia) Alyssa Healy	146	2010–2024
55	(Netherlands) Babette de Leede	102	2018–2026
51	(India) Richa Ghosh	93	2020–2026
51	(England) Amy Jones	121	2013–2026
49	(United Arab Emirates) Theertha Satish	94	2021–2026
49	(Uganda) Kevin Awino	113	2018–2026
Innings refers to when the player was the designated keeper. All figures exclude catches not made as a wicketkeeper. Last updated: 18 November 2026

=== Most stumpings in career ===
Stumpings	Wicket-keeper	Innings	T20I career span
64	(Thailand) Nannapat Koncharoenkai	133	2018–2026
63	(Australia) Alyssa Healy	146	2010–2024
53	(Bangladesh) Nigar Sultana	77	2015–2026
51	(England) Sarah Taylor	88	2006–2019
45	(India) Taniya Bhatia	53	2018–2022
45	(Scotland) Sarah Bryce	85	2018–2026
45	(India) Richa Ghosh	93	2020–2026
Innings refers to when the player was the designated keeper. Last updated: 18 November 2026

== Partnership records ==
=== Highest overall partnership runs by a pair ===
Rank	Runs	Batters	Batting team	Innings	Highest	Average	100s	50s	Period
1	4,190	Smriti Mandhana & Shafali Verma †	India	109	162	39.52	6	27	2019–2026
2	2,952	Esha Oza & Theertha Satish †	United Arab Emirates	82	192	40.43	6	17	2021–2026
3	2,720	Alyssa Healy & Beth Mooney	Australia	84	151	33.58	4	16	2016–2024
4	2,556	Suzie Bates & Sophie Devine	New Zealand	79	182	32.76	5	13	2010–2024
5	2,243	Natthakan Chantham & Nannapat Koncharoenkai †	Thailand	74	157*	36.17	1	12	2018–2026
An asterisk (*) signifies an unbroken partnership (i.e. neither of the batters were dismissed before either the end of the allotted overs or the required score being reached). Last updated: 13 November 2026

=== Highest partnerships (any wicket) ===
Runs	Wicket	Batsmen	Batting team	Opposition	Venue	Date	Scorecard
350	1st	Lucia Taylor & Albertina Galan	Argentina	Chile	St Albans Club, Buenos Aires	13 October 2023	
290*	2nd	Veronica Vasquez & Maria Castiñeiras	Argentina	Chile	St Albans Club, Buenos Aires	15 October 2023	
257	1st	Yulia Anggraeni & Kadek Winda Prastini	Indonesia	Philippines	Friendship Oval, Dasmariñas	21 December 2019	
255*	2nd	Tharanga Gajanayake & Deepika Rasangika	Bahrain	Saudi Arabia	Oman Cricket Academy Ground Turf 2, Muscat	22 March 2022	
236*	3rd	Nigar Sultana & Fargana Hoque	Bangladesh	Maldives	Pokhara Stadium, Pokhara	5 December 2019	
An asterisk (*) signifies an unbroken partnership (i.e. neither of the batters was dismissed before either the end of the allotted overs or the required score being reached). Last updated: 15 October 2023.

=== Highest partnerships (by wicket) ===
Partnership	Runs	Batsmen	Batting team	Opposition	Venue	Date	Scorecard
1st wicket	350	Lucia Taylor & Albertina Galan	Argentina	Chile	St Albans Club, Buenos Aires	13 October 2023	
2nd wicket	290*	Veronica Vasquez & Maria Castiñeiras	Argentina	Chile	St Albans Club, Buenos Aires	15 October 2023	
3rd wicket	236*	Nigar Sultana & Fargana Hoque	Bangladesh	Maldives	Pokhara Stadium, Pokhara	5 December 2019	
4th wicket	147*	Karen Rolton & Kate Blackwell	Australia	England	County Ground, Taunton	2 September 2005	
5th wicket	166*	Puja Mahato & Rubina Chhetry	Nepal	Maldives	UKM-YSD Cricket Oval, Bangi	13 February 2024	
6th wicket	135*	Gisele Ishimwe & Alice Ikuzwe	Rwanda	Eswatini	Botswana Cricket Association Oval, Gaborone	12 September 2021	
7th wicket	101*	Analise Merritt & Grace Wetherall	Jersey	Germany	Grainville Cricket Ground, St Saviour	30 May 2023	
8th wicket	66*	Line Ostergaard & Nita Dalgaard	Denmark	Isle of Man	Happy Valley Ground 2, Episkopi	19 April 2025	
9th wicket	76*	Andrea-Mae Zepeda & Priya Sabu	Austria	Czech Republic	Seebarn Cricket Ground, Seebarn	9 June 2024	
10th wicket	52*	Gulce Cengiz & Duygu Tekyildirim	Turkey	Greece	Vasil Levski National Sports Academy, Sofia	9 July 2025	
An asterisk (*) signifies an unbroken partnership (i.e. neither of the batters were dismissed before either the end of the allotted overs or the required score being reached). Last updated: 9 July 2025.

== Others records ==
=== Most matches played ===
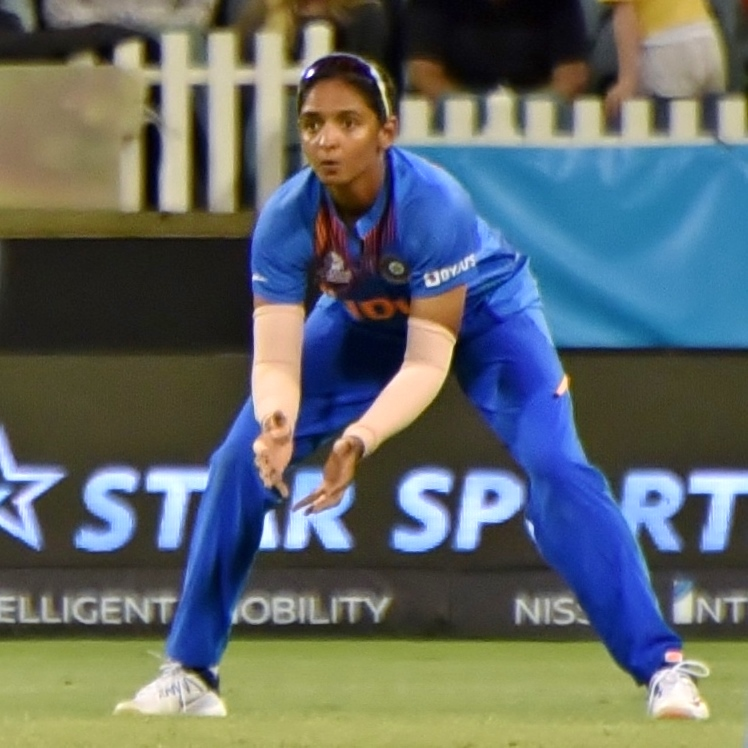
India's Harmanpreet Kaur has played in more T20I matches than any other player.

Rank	Matches	Player	Runs	Wkts	Period
1	213	(India) Harmanpreet Kaur†	4,438	32	2009–2026
2	187	(England) Danni Wyatt-Hodge†	3,671	46	2010–2026
3	186	(New Zealand) Suzie Bates	4,758	62	2007–2026
4	184	(Australia) Ellyse Perry†	2,558	131	2008–2026
5	182	(India) Smriti Mandhana†	4,923	0	2013–2026
Last updated: 20 October 2026

=== Most consecutive matches ===
Matches	Player	Period
141*	(Rwanda) Henriette Ishimwe	2019–2026
137*	(Bangladesh) Nigar Sultana	2015–2026
131*	(Thailand) Nannapat Koncharoenkai	2019–2026
122*	(Uganda) Janet Mbabazi	2021–2026
121*	(Rwanda) Marie Bimenyimana	2019–2026
* indicates a streak in progress. Last updated: 18 November 2026

=== Youngest player ===
Age	Player	Date
11 years, 40 days	(Jersey) Nia Greig	31 July 2019
11 years, 134 days	(Maldives) Sumayya Abdul	2 December 2019
11 years, 293 days	(Jersey) Taci Alker	2 August 2019
11 years, 308 days	(Peru) Kyara Villanella	3 October 2019
11 years, 325 days	(United Arab Emirates) Samaira Dharnidharka	3 October 2019
Last updated: 7 December 2019.

=== Oldest player ===
Age	Player	Date
70 years, 146 days	(Chile) Ivonne Vildosola	26 April 2026
68 years, 72 days	(Gibraltar) Sally Barton	3 August 2025
65 years, 123 days	(Guernsey) Philippa Stahelin	29 August 2026
64 years, 183 days	(Portugal) Joanna Child	9 April 2025
62 years, 28 days	(Cayman Islands) Molly Moore	29 September 2024
Last updated: 29 August 2026

=== Oldest debutant ===
Age on debut	Player	Date
70 years, 145 days	(Chile) Ivonne Vildosola	25 April 2026
66 years, 334 days	(Gibraltar) Sally Barton	21 April 2024
64 years, 181 days	(Portugal) Joanna Child	7 April 2025
62 years, 25 days	(Cayman Islands) Molly Moore	26 September 2024
58 years, 192 days	(Cayman Islands) Marcia Moiten	26 September 2024
Last updated: 26 September 2026

=== Most matches as captain ===
Rank	Matches	Player	Won	Lost	Tied	NR	Won%	Period
1	155	(India) Harmanpreet Kaur†	92	57	1	5	59.35	2012–2026
2	127	(Sri Lanka) Chamari Athapaththu†	59	65	0	3	46.45	2014–2026
3	108	(Rwanda) Marie Bimenyimana†	67	39	0	1	62.03	2021–2026
4	102	(Thailand) Naruemol Chaiwai †	67	34	0	1	65.68	2021–2026
5	100	(Australia) Meg Lanning	76	18	1	5	76.00	2014–2023
Last updated: 18 November 2026

=== Most matches won as a captain ===
Rank	Won	Player	Matches	W/L Ratio	Period
1	92	(India) Harmanpreet Kaur†	155	1.61	2012–2026
2	76	(Australia) Meg Lanning	100	4.22	2014–2023
3	71	(England) Heather Knight	96	3.08	2016–2025
4	68	(England) Charlotte Edwards	93	2.95	2006–2016
5	67	(Thailand) Naruemol Chaiwai†	102	1.97	2021–2026
5	67	(Rwanda) Marie Bimenyimana†	108	1.71	2021–2026
Last updated: 18 November 2026

=== Most player-of-the-match awards ===
No. of Awards	Player	Matches	T20I career span
30	(United Arab Emirates) Esha Oza	123	2018–2026
27	(Rwanda) Henriette Ishimwe	141	2019–2026
23	(Cricket West Indies) Hayley Matthews	127	2008–2026
22	(Cricket West Indies) Stafanie Taylor	142	2008–2026
21	(Sri Lanka) Chamari Athapaththu	173	2009–2026
21	(New Zealand) Suzie Bates	186	2007–2026
Last updated: 18 November 2026

=== Most player-of-the-series awards ===
No. of Awards	Player	T20I career span
7	(Cricket West Indies) (Barbados) Hayley Matthews	2014–2026
7	(Cricket West Indies) (Barbados) Deandra Dottin	2008–2026
6	(Sri Lanka) Chamari Athapaththu	2009–2026
5	(Australia) Alyssa Healy	2010–2024
5	(India) Shafali Verma	2019-2026
Last updated: 20 October 2026

== See also ==
- ICC Women's T20 World Cup
- List of women's Test cricket records
- List of women's One Day International cricket records
- List of men's Twenty20 International records
