= 2026 Women's T20 World Cup qualification =

2026 ICC Women's T20 World Cup qualification
- Dates: 10 March 2025 – 2 February 2026
- Administrators: International Cricket Council; Africa Cricket Association; Asian Cricket Council; ICC Americas; ICC East Asia-Pacific; ICC Europe
- Cricket format: Women's Twenty20 International

The 2026 Women's T20 World Cup qualification was a process by which teams qualified for the 2026 Women's T20 World Cup in England. A series of regional qualification tournaments determined the teams that took part in the Global Qualifier in 2026, where the top four teams qualified for the World Cup scheduled to be held in England.

In total, 53 countries took part in the regional qualification process to advance to the Global Qualifier. Regional tournaments were held between March 2025 and February 2026. These included Europe qualifier (8 teams), EAP qualifier (8 teams), Americas qualifier (4 teams), Asia qualifier (9 teams) and Africa qualifier (14 teams) and Global qualifier (10 teams).

== Qualified teams ==
Highlighted are the countries that participated in the 2026 Women's T20 World Cup. Qualified directly (hosts, top 5 from the previous tournament, or via T20I Rankings) Qualified via the Global qualifier Failed to qualify

Details of the teams qualified for 2026 WT20WC
Team	Method of qualification	Date of qualification	Venue(s)	No. of teams	First time qualified	Last time qualified	Total times qualified	Previous best performance
England	Hosts	26 July 2022	—N/a	1	2009	2024	10	Winners (2009)
Australia	2024 Women's T20 World Cup	15 October 2024	United Arab Emirates	5	2009	2024	10	Winners (2010, 2012, 2014, 2018, 2020, 2023)
India	2024 Women's T20 World Cup	15 October 2024	United Arab Emirates	5	2009	2024	10	Runners-up (2020)
New Zealand	2024 Women's T20 World Cup	15 October 2024	United Arab Emirates	5	2009	2024	10	Winners (2024)
South Africa	2024 Women's T20 World Cup	15 October 2024	United Arab Emirates	5	2009	2024	10	Runners-up (2023, 2024)
West Indies	2024 Women's T20 World Cup	15 October 2024	United Arab Emirates	5	2009	2024	10	Winners (2016)
Pakistan	ICC Women's T20I; Team Rankings	20 October 2024	—N/a	2	2009	2024	10	First Round (2009 to 2024)
Sri Lanka	ICC Women's T20I; Team Rankings	20 October 2024	—N/a	2	2009	2024	10	First Round (2009 to 2024)
Bangladesh	Global Qualifier	2 February 2026	Nepal	4	2014	2024	7	First Round (2014 to 2024)
Ireland	Global Qualifier	2 February 2026	Nepal	4	2014	2023	5	Group stage (2014, 2016, 2018, 2023)
Netherlands	Global Qualifier	2 February 2026	Nepal	4	—	—	1	Debut
Scotland	Global Qualifier	2 February 2026	Nepal	4	2024	2024	2	Group stage (2024)
Total				12				

== Africa Qualifier ==
The Africa Qualifier was held in two stages, Division Two and Division One. Division Two was held in Botswana from 20 to 26 July 2025, with the top two teams advancing to Division One. Division One was held in Namibia from 31 August to 6 September. The top two teams, Namibia and Zimbabwe, qualified for the Global Qualifier.

Division Two	Division One
Botswana; Cameroon; Eswatini; Lesotho; Malawi; Mozambique; Rwanda; Sierra Leone	Kenya; Namibia; Nigeria; Rwanda; Sierra Leone; Tanzania; Uganda; Zimbabwe

=== Division Two ===
Pos	Team	Pld	W	L	NR	Pts	NRR	Qualification
1	Rwanda	3	3	0	0	6	4.915	Advanced to the semi-finals
2	Malawi	3	2	1	0	4	1.283	Advanced to the semi-finals
3	Cameroon	3	1	2	0	2	−0.875	Advanced to the play-offs
4	Lesotho	3	0	3	0	0	−4.591	Advanced to the play-offs

Source: ESPNcricinfo

Pos	Team	Pld	W	L	NR	Pts	NRR	Qualification
1	Sierra Leone	3	3	0	0	6	4.587	Advanced to the semi-finals
2	Botswana	3	2	1	0	4	2.837	Advanced to the semi-finals
3	Mozambique	3	1	2	0	2	−1.026	Advanced to the play-offs
4	Eswatini	3	0	3	0	0	−5.800	Advanced to the play-offs

Source: ESPNcricinfo

=== Division One ===
Pos	Team	Pld	W	L	NR	Pts	NRR	Qualification
1	Zimbabwe	3	3	0	0	6	2.173	Advanced to the semi-finals
2	Namibia	3	2	1	0	4	3.377	Advanced to the semi-finals
3	Nigeria	3	1	2	0	2	0.040	Advanced to the play-offs
4	Sierra Leone	3	0	3	0	0	−5.442	Advanced to the play-offs

Source: ESPNcricinfo

Pos	Team	Pld	W	L	NR	Pts	NRR	Qualification
1	Tanzania	3	3	0	0	6	0.817	Advanced to the semi-finals
2	Uganda	3	2	1	0	4	0.536	Advanced to the semi-finals
3	Rwanda	3	1	2	0	2	−0.545	Advanced to the play-offs
4	Kenya	3	0	3	0	0	−0.795	Advanced to the play-offs

Source: ESPNcricinfo

== Americas Qualifier ==
The Americas Qualifier was held in Argentina in March 2025. United States qualified for the Global Qualifier after finishing as the top team.

Teams
- Argentina
- Brazil
- Canada
- United States

Pos	Team	Pld	W	L	NR	Pts	NRR	Qualification
1	United States	6	5	1	0	10	3.295	Advanced to the global qualifier
2	Canada	6	4	2	0	8	0.243	
3	Brazil	6	2	4	0	4	−1.321	
4	Argentina	6	1	5	0	2	−1.794	

Source: ESPNcricinfo

== Asia Qualifier ==
The Asia Qualifier was held in Thailand from 9 to 20 May 2025. Thailand and Nepal qualified for the Global Qualifier.

Teams
- Bahrain
- Bhutan
- Hong Kong
- Kuwait
- Malaysia
- Nepal
- Qatar
- Thailand
- United Arab Emirates

Pos	Team	Pld	W	L	T	NR	Pts	NRR	Qualification
1	Thailand	4	2	0	0	2	6	4.642	Advanced to the Super Three
2	Kuwait	4	1	2	0	1	3	−0.476	
3	Bhutan	4	1	2	0	1	3	−1.774	

Source: ESPNcricinfo

Pos	Team	Pld	W	L	T	NR	Pts	NRR	Qualification
1	United Arab Emirates	4	2	0	0	2	6	6.998	Advanced to the Super Three
2	Malaysia	4	1	1	0	2	4	3.059	
3	Qatar	4	0	2	0	2	2	−7.843	

Source: ESPNcricinfo

Pos	Team	Pld	W	L	T	NR	Pts	NRR	Qualification
1	Nepal	4	2	1	0	1	5	0.830	Advanced to the Super Three
2	Hong Kong	4	1	0	0	3	5	0.867	
3	Bahrain	4	0	2	0	2	2	−1.800	

Source: ESPNcricinfo

Pos	Team	Pld	W	L	T	NR	Pts	NRR	Qualification
1	Thailand	6	4	0	0	2	10	3.808	Qualified for the global qualifier
2	Nepal	6	3	2	0	1	7	−1.136	Qualified for the global qualifier
3	United Arab Emirates	6	2	2	0	2	6	1.869	

Source: ESPNcricinfo

== East Asia-Pacific Qualifier ==
The East Asia-Pacific Qualifier was held in Fiji from 9 to 17 September 2025. Papua New Guinea qualified for the Global Qualifier.

Teams
- Cook Islands
- Fiji
- Indonesia
- Japan
- Papua New Guinea
- Philippines
- Samoa
- Vanuatu

Pos	Team	Pld	W	L	NR	Pts	NRR	Qualification
1	Papua New Guinea	3	2	1	0	4	3.333	Advanced to the semi-finals
2	Japan	3	2	1	0	4	2.283	Advanced to the semi-finals
3	Samoa	3	2	1	0	4	0.156	Advanced to the play-offs
4	Philippines	3	0	3	0	0	−6.756	Advanced to the play-offs

Source: ESPNcricinfo

Pos	Team	Pld	W	L	NR	Pts	NRR	Qualification
1	Vanuatu	3	3	0	0	6	2.254	Advanced to the semi-finals
2	Indonesia	3	2	1	0	4	2.583	Advanced to the semi-finals
3	Fiji	3	1	2	0	2	−1.953	Advanced to the play-offs
4	Cook Islands	3	0	3	0	0	−3.052	Advanced to the play-offs

Source: ESPNcricinfo

=== Knockout stage ===
Semi-finals
A1	Papua New Guinea	136/5 (19.3 overs)
B2	Indonesia	134/3 (20 overs)
B1	Vanuatu	156/1 (20 overs)
A2	Japan	134/4 (20 overs)

Final
SF1W	Papua New Guinea	114/1 (20 overs)
SF2W	Vanuatu	113/9 (20 overs)

== Europe Qualifier ==
The Europe Qualifier was held in two stages, Division Two and Division One. The top two teams from Division Two advanced to Division One in a four-team round robin group, where they competed for two spots in the Global Qualifier. Ireland and Netherlands qualified for the Global Qualifier.

Division Two	Division One
Germany; Isle of Man; Italy; Jersey; Spain; Sweden	Germany; Italy; Ireland; Netherlands

=== Division Two ===
Pos	Team	Pld	W	L	NR	Pts	NRR	Qualification
1	Italy	5	5	0	0	10	2.273	Advanced to Division One
2	Germany	5	4	1	0	8	0.540	Advanced to Division One
3	Jersey	5	2	3	0	4	0.781	
4	Sweden	5	2	3	0	4	−1.318	
5	Spain	5	1	4	0	2	−1.032	
6	Isle of Man	5	1	4	0	2	−1.164	

Source: ESPNcricinfo

=== Division One ===
Pos	Team	Pld	W	L	NR	Pts	NRR	Qualification
1	Ireland	6	6	0	0	12	3.309	Advanced to the global qualifier
2	Netherlands	6	4	2	0	8	2.833	Advanced to the global qualifier
3	Italy	6	2	4	0	4	−0.906	
4	Germany	6	0	6	0	0	−5.611	

Source: ESPNcricinfo

== Global Qualifier ==
The Global Qualifier was held in Nepal from 18 January to 1 February 2026 in which the top four teams from the Super 6 stage qualified for the 2026 Women's T20 World Cup in England and Wales.

=== Group stage ===
==== Group A ====
Group A standings
Pos	Team	Pld	W	L	NR	Pts	NRR	Qualification
1	Bangladesh	4	4	0	0	8	1.750	Advanced to the Super 6 stage
2	Ireland	4	3	1	0	6	1.165	Advanced to the Super 6 stage
3	United States	4	2	2	0	4	−0.209	Advanced to the Super 6 stage
4	Papua New Guinea	4	1	3	0	2	−1.025	Eliminated
5	Namibia	4	0	4	0	0	−1.669	Eliminated

Source: ESPNcricinfo

==== Group B ====
Group B standings
Pos	Team	Pld	W	L	NR	Pts	NRR	Qualification
1	Netherlands	4	4	0	0	8	0.600	Advanced to the Super 6 stage
2	Scotland	4	3	1	0	6	2.045	Advanced to the Super 6 stage
3	Thailand	4	2	2	0	4	−0.424	Advanced to the Super 6 stage
4	Nepal (H)	4	1	3	0	2	−1.151	Eliminated
5	Zimbabwe	4	0	4	0	0	−0.942	Eliminated

Source: ESPNcricinfo
(H) Hosts

=== Super 6 stage ===
Super 6 stage standings
Pos	Team	Pld	W	L	NR	Pts	NRR	Qualification
1	Bangladesh	5	5	0	0	10	1.886	Qualified for the 2026 Women's T20 World Cup
2	Ireland	5	3	2	0	6	1.280	Qualified for the 2026 Women's T20 World Cup
3	Scotland	5	3	2	0	6	0.292	Qualified for the 2026 Women's T20 World Cup
4	Netherlands	5	3	2	0	6	−0.836	Qualified for the 2026 Women's T20 World Cup
5	United States	5	1	4	0	2	−0.772	Eliminated
6	Thailand	5	0	5	0	0	−1.883	Eliminated

Source: ESPNcricinfo
