= 2025 Women's T20 World Cup Africa Qualifier =

Women's international cricket tournament

The 2025 ICC Women's T20 World Cup Africa Qualifier was a cricket tournament that formed part of the qualification process for the 2026 Women's T20 World Cup. The first stage of the tournament was Division Two, featuring eight teams and played in Botswana in July 2025. Rwanda and Sierra Leone reached the final of Division Two and therefore progressed to Division One. Rwanda defeated Sierra Leone by 51 runs in the final.

Division One was played in Namibia in September, with the top two sides advancing to the Global Qualifier. Namibia and Zimbabwe secured the qualification places. Zimbabwe defeated Namibia in the final by 9 wickets. Nigeria and Sierra Leone were relegated to Division Two, despite Nigeria's Lucky Piety being named player of the series.

== Teams ==
Division Two	Division One
Botswana; Cameroon; Eswatini; Lesotho; Malawi; Mozambique; Rwanda; Sierra Leone	Kenya; Namibia; Nigeria; Rwanda; Sierra Leone; Tanzania; Uganda; Zimbabwe

== Division Two ==
2025 ICC Women's T20 World Cup Africa Qualifier Division Two
- Dates: 20 – 26 July 2025
- Administrator: African Cricket Association
- Cricket format: Twenty20 International
- Host: Botswana
- Champions: Rwanda
- Runners-up: Sierra Leone
- Participants: 8
- Matches: 20
- Most runs: (Sierra Leone) Emma Kamara (165)
- Most wickets: (Cameroon) Edwige Guehoada (10) (Botswana) Pako Mapotsane (10) (Mozambique) Olga Matsolo (10)

=== Squads ===
Botswana	Cameroon	Eswatini	Lesotho	Malawi	Mozambique	Rwanda	Sierra Leone
Tuelo Shadrack (c); Tlhalefo Godisamang; Kesego Inakale; Onneile Keitsemang; Oratile Kgeresi; Pako Mapotsane; Goabilwe Matome; Amante Mokgotlhe; Laura Mophakedi (wk); Aliya Motorwalo; Wendy Moutswi; Merapelo Phiase; Maatla Sefati; Goitseone Setshwane	Madaleine Sissako (c, wk); Sonita Akenji; Marguerite Bessala; Nangeh Diom; Maeva Douma; Michelle Ekani; Edwige Guehoada; Elsa Kana; Clemence Manidom; Cathy Mbelel; Bernadette Mbida; Jeanne Ngono; Olive Ranedoumoun; Brenda Waluma	Mbali Dlamini (c); Tibusiso Dlamini; Winile Ginindza; Lethokuhle Gwebu; Ntombizini Gwebu; Nothando Mabila; Tenele Malinga; Lindokuhle Mamba; Nkosingiphile Mamba; Ntombizodwa Mkhatshwa (wk); Lihle Shabalala; Zinhle Shabalala; Lulama Simelane; Noncedo Simelane (wk)	Maneo Nyabela (c); Tsepang Khabo; Thandi Kobeli; Retsepile Limema; Makopano Mabathoana; Kananelo Mabitle; Thato Mahe; Kananelo Molapo; Paballo Pheko (wk); Boitumelo Phelanyane; Tanki Ramabitsa; Nthatuoa Thekiso; Boitumelo Tlali; Mosa Tsemane	Ketrina Chingaipe (c); Lucy Bigula; Christina Bwanali; Sophina Chinawa; Lidia Dimba; Eva Kabwere; Sungeni Kananji; Triphonia Luka; Angela Lumbe (wk); Febbe Malefula; Lucy Malino; Praise Maziya; Esther Richard; Lucy Wesley	Angelica Salomao (c); Wisley Bucuane; Laura Chipanga; Isabel Chuma; Palmira Cuinca; Rosalia Haiong; Ilza Machava; Cristina Magaia (wk); Alda Mangue; Olga Matsolo; Olga Mondlane; Irene Mulhovo; Amelia Mundudo; Yudney Murrure	Marie Bimenyimana (c); Alice Ikuzwe; Georgette Ingabire; Rosine Irera; Gisele Ishimwe; Henriette Ishimwe; Belise Murekatete; Shakila Niyomuhoza; Rosette Shimwamana; Clarrisse Umutoniwase; Sylvia Usabyimana; Geovanis Uwase; Merveille Uwase (wk); Sarah Uwera (wk)	Aminata Kamara (c); Aisha Bangura; Celina Bull; Linda Bull; Fatu Conteh (wk); Alice Fillie; Ann Marie Kamara; Emma Kamara; Zainab Kamara (wk); Fatu Pessima; Patrica Pratt; Hassanatu Sawaneh; Hussainatu Sawanneh; Marie Turay

=== Group A ===
==== Points table ====
Pos	Team	Pld	W	L	NR	Pts	NRR	Qualification
1	Rwanda	3	3	0	0	6	4.915	Advanced to the semi-finals
2	Malawi	3	2	1	0	4	1.283	Advanced to the semi-finals
3	Cameroon	3	1	2	0	2	−0.875	Advanced to the play-offs
4	Lesotho	3	0	3	0	0	−4.591	Advanced to the play-offs

Source: ESPNcricinfo

==== Fixtures ====
20 July 2025
09:30
Scorecard

Lesotho; 23 (10.1 overs)	v	Rwanda; 24/0 (3.1 overs)
Kananelo Molapo 4 (10); Rosine Irera 3/4 (3.1 overs)		Marie Bimenyimana 15* (12)

Rwanda won by 10 wickets
Botswana Cricket Association Oval 1, Gaborone
Umpires: Lauren Agenbag (SA) and Patric Makumbi (Uga)
Player of the match: Marie Bimenyimana (Rwa)

- Lesotho won the toss and elected to bat.
- Boitumelo Tlali (Les) made her T20I debut.

20 July 2025
13:50
Scorecard

Malawi; 111/5 (20 overs)	v	Cameroon; 73 (17.5 overs)
Praise Maziya 28* (26); Edwige Guehoada 1/13 (4 overs)		Edwige Guehoada 16* (34); Eva Kabwere 4/21 (4 overs)

Malawi won by 38 runs
Botswana Cricket Association Oval 1, Gaborone
Umpires: Ravi Angara (Bot) and Patric Makumbi (Uga)
Player of the match: Eva Kabwere (Mwi)

- Cameroon won the toss and elected to field.
- Nangeh Diom (Cmr) and Angela Lumbe (Mwi) both made their T20I debuts.

21 July 2025
09:30
Scorecard

Rwanda; 138/6 (20 overs)	v	Malawi; 71/9 (20 overs)
Gisele Ishimwe 42 (46); Sungeni Kananji 2/22 (4 overs)		Lidia Dimba 26 (33); Henriette Ishimwe 3/13 (4 overs)

Rwanda won by 67 runs
Botswana Cricket Association Oval 2, Gaborone
Umpires: Rockie D'Mello (Ken) and Kerrin Klaaste (SA)
Player of the match: Henriette Ishimwe (Rwa)

- Rwanda won the toss and elected to bat.

21 July 2025
13:50
Scorecard

Cameroon; 105/9 (20 overs)	v	Lesotho; 50 (17 overs)
Clemence Manidom 12 (13); Boitumelo Tlali 3/11 (4 overs)		Boitumelo Tlali 10 (27); Edwige Guehoada 4/8 (4 overs)

Cameroon won by 55 runs
Botswana Cricket Association Oval 2, Gaborone
Umpires: Ravi Angara (Bot) and Rockie D'Mello (Ken)
Player of the match: Edwige Guehoada (Cmr)

- Cameroon won the toss and elected to bat.

23 July 2025
09:30
Scorecard

Malawi; 162/5 (20 overs)	v	Lesotho; 56 (14.4 overs)
Febbe Malefula 62* (35); Tanki Ramabitsa 2/42 (4 overs)		Maneo Nyabela 18 (25); Lucy Malino 4/14 (2.4 overs)

Malawi won by 106 runs
Botswana Cricket Association Oval 1, Gaborone
Umpires: Arno Jacobs (SA) and David Odhiambo (Ken)
Player of the match: Febbe Malefula (Mwi)

- Malawi won the toss and elected to bat.
- Lucy Bigula (Mwi) made her T20I debut.

23 July 2025
13:50
Scorecard

Cameroon; 20 (13.1 overs)	v	Rwanda; 22/0 (3.5 overs)
Madaleine Sissako 9 (27); Rosine Irera 2/1 (2 overs)		Georgette Ingabire 13* (16)

Rwanda won by 10 wickets
Botswana Cricket Association Oval 2, Gaborone
Umpires: Lauren Agenbag (SA) and Ravi Angara (Bot)
Player of the match: Rosine Irera (Rwa)

- Cameroon won the toss and elected to bat.

=== Group B ===
==== Points table ====
Pos	Team	Pld	W	L	NR	Pts	NRR	Qualification
1	Sierra Leone	3	3	0	0	6	4.587	Advanced to the semi-finals
2	Botswana	3	2	1	0	4	2.837	Advanced to the semi-finals
3	Mozambique	3	1	2	0	2	−1.026	Advanced to the play-offs
4	Eswatini	3	0	3	0	0	−5.800	Advanced to the play-offs

Source: ESPNcricinfo

==== Fixtures ====
20 July 2025
09:30
Scorecard

Botswana; 170/4 (20 overs)	v	Eswatini; 59/8 (20 overs)
Laura Mophakedi 54 (49); Tibusiso Dlamini 1/26 (4 overs)		Mbali Dlamini 20 (41); Goabilwe Matome 2/2 (4 overs)

Botswana won by 111 runs
Botswana Cricket Association Oval 2, Gaborone
Umpires: Sarah Dambanevana (Zim) and Arno Jacobs (SA)
Player of the match: Laura Mophakedi (Bot)

- Botswana won the toss and elected to bat.

20 July 2025
13:50
Scorecard

Sierra Leone; 141/5 (20 overs)	v	Mozambique; 64 (17.5 overs)
Aminata Kamara 46 (31); Olga Matsolo 3/33 (4 overs)		Isabel Chuma 26 (44); Linda Bull 4/10 (3 overs)

Sierra Leone won by 77 runs
Botswana Cricket Association Oval 2, Gaborone
Umpires: Kerrin Klaaste (SA) and David Odhiambo (Ken)
Player of the match: Linda Bull (Sle)

- Mozambique won the toss and elected to field.

21 July 2025
09:30
Scorecard

Mozambique; 53/9 (20 overs)	v	Botswana; 54/2 (7.3 overs)
Palmira Cuinca 12 (32); Pako Mapotsane 4/6 (3 overs)		Goabilwe Matome 24* (24); Palmira Cuinca 1/25 (3 overs)

Botswana won by 8 wickets
Botswana Cricket Association Oval 1, Gaborone
Umpires: Lauren Agenbag (SA) and David Odhiambo (Ken)
Player of the match: Goabilwe Matome (Bot)

- Mozambique won the toss and elected to bat.

21 July 2025
13:50
Scorecard

Sierra Leone; 190/6 (20 overs)	v	Eswatini; 41/8 (20 overs)
Emma Kamara 71 (60); Nothando Mabila 1/21 (3 overs)		Nothando Mabila 20* (18); Aminata Kamara 3/3 (4 overs)

Sierra Leone won by 149 runs
Botswana Cricket Association Oval 1, Gaborone
Umpires: Sarah Dambanevana (Zim) and Arno Jacobs (SA)
Player of the match: Emma Kamara (Sle)

- Eswatini won the toss and elected to field.
- Noncedo Simelane (Esw) made her T20I debut.

23 July 2025
09:30
Scorecard

Mozambique; 165/3 (20 overs)	v	Eswatini; 77/9 (20 overs)
Cristina Magaia 52 (41); Lulama Simelane 2/52 (4 overs)		Mbali Dlamini 40 (41); Palmira Cuinca 3/4 (4 overs)

Mozambique won by 88 runs
Botswana Cricket Association Oval 2, Gaborone
Umpires: Rockie D'Mello (Ken) and Patric Makumbi (Uga)
Player of the match: Cristina Magaia (Moz)

- Mozambique won the toss and elected to bat.

23 July 2025
13:50
Scorecard

Botswana; 89/4 (20 overs)	v	Sierra Leone; 90/5 (13.5 overs)
Goabilwe Matome 32 (47); Ann Marie Kamara 2/10 (4 overs)		Emma Kamara 33* (32); Pako Mapotsane 2/8 (2 overs)

Sierra Leone won by 5 wickets
Botswana Cricket Association Oval 1, Gaborone
Umpires: Sarah Dambanevana (Zim) and Kerrin Klaaste (SA)
Player of the match: Emma Kamara (Sle)

- Botswana won the toss and elected to bat.

=== Play-offs ===
5th place semi-final 1
24 July 2025
09:30
Scorecard

Cameroon; 177/5 (20 overs)	v	Eswatini; 37 (17.1 overs)
Madaleine Sissako 57 (56); Nkosingiphile Mamba 2/29 (4 overs)		Mbali Dlamini 13 (26); Edwige Guehoada 4/1 (4 overs)

Cameroon won by 140 runs
Botswana Cricket Association Oval 2, Gaborone
Umpires: Kerrin Klaaste (SA) and Patric Makumbi (Uga)
Player of the match: Edwige Guehoada (Cmr)

- Eswatini won the toss and elected to field.

5th place semi-final 2
24 July 2025
13:50
Scorecard

Lesotho; 100/8 (20 overs)	v	Mozambique; 101/7 (16.4 overs)
Maneo Nyabela 19 (25); Olga Matsolo 1/11 (4 overs)		Wisley Bucuane 18* (16); Maneo Nyabela 2/21 (4 overs)

Mozambique won by 3 wickets
Botswana Cricket Association Oval 2, Gaborone
Umpires: Arno Jacobs (SA) and Sarah Dambanevana (Zim)
Player of the match: Rosalia Haiong (Moz)

- Lesotho won the toss and elected to bat.
- Nthatuoa Thekiso (Les) made her T20I debut.

7th place play-off
26 July 2025
09:30
Scorecard

Lesotho; 88/9 (20 overs)	v	Eswatini; 40 (14.2 overs)
Boitumelo Phelanyane 27 (39); Mbali Dlamini 3/14 (4 overs)		Ntombizodwa Mkhatshwa 6 (12); Maneo Nyabela 3/6 (3 overs)

Lesotho won by 48 runs
Botswana Cricket Association Oval 2, Gaborone
Umpires: Ravi Angara (Bot) and Sarah Dambanevana (Zim)
Player of the match: Maneo Nyabela (Les)

- Eswatini won the toss and elected to field.

5th place play-off
26 July 2025
13:50
Scorecard

Mozambique; 87/8 (20 overs)	v	Cameroon; 88/8 (18 overs)
Isabel Chuma 17 (29); Maeva Douma 2/13 (4 overs)		Madaleine Sissako 27 (35); Olga Matsolo 4/13 (4 overs)

Cameroon won by 2 wickets
Botswana Cricket Association Oval 2, Gaborone
Umpires: Lauren Agenbag (SA) and Patric Makumbi (Uga)
Player of the match: Olive Ranedoumoun (Cmr)

- Mozambique won the toss and elected to bat.

=== Finals ===
Semi-final 1
24 July 2025
09:30
Scorecard

Rwanda; 99/9 (20 overs)	v	Botswana; 64/9 (20 overs)
Gisele Ishimwe 24 (32); Goitseone Setshwane 3/17 (4 overs)		Laura Mophakedi 31 (56); Alice Ikuzwe 3/16 (4 overs)

Rwanda won by 35 runs
Botswana Cricket Association Oval 1, Gaborone
Umpires: Lauren Agenbag (SA) and David Odhiambo (Ken)
Player of the match: Henriette Ishimwe (Rwa)

- Rwanda won the toss and elected to bat.

Semi-final 2
24 July 2025
13:50
Scorecard

Malawi; 100/6 (20 overs)	v	Sierra Leone; 101/4 (15.2 overs)
Febbe Malefula 27* (18); Aminata Kamara 3/14 (4 overs)		Marie Turay 32 (36); Christina Bwanali 1/10 (3.2 overs)

Sierra Leone won by 6 wickets
Botswana Cricket Association Oval 1, Gaborone
Umpires: Ravi Angara (Bot) and Rockie D'Mello (Ken)
Player of the match: Aminata Kamara (Sle)

- Sierra Leone won the toss and elected to field.

3rd place play-off
26 July 2025
09:30
Scorecard

Botswana; 143/6 (20 overs)	v	Malawi; 78 (15.4 overs)
Amante Mokgotlhe 60* (46); Lucy Bigula 1/23 (3 overs)		Sungeni Kananji 28 (25); Goabilwe Matome 3/15 (4 overs)

Botswana won by 65 runs
Botswana Cricket Association Oval 1, Gaborone
Umpires: Rockie D'Mello (Ken) and David Odhiambo (Ken)
Player of the match: Amante Mokgotlhe (Bot)

- Malawi won the toss and elected to field.

Final
26 July 2025
13:50
Scorecard

Rwanda; 135/7 (20 overs)	v	Sierra Leone; 84 (18.1 overs)
Gisele Ishimwe 44 (28); Ann Marie Kamara 2/19 (3 overs); Fatu Pessima 2/19 (3 overs)		Linda Bull 19 (28); Belise Murekatete 2/9 (3 overs)

Rwanda won by 51 runs
Botswana Cricket Association Oval 1, Gaborone
Umpires: Arno Jacobs (SA) and Kerrin Klaaste (SA)
Player of the match: Gisele Ishimwe (Rwa)

- Sierra Leone won the toss and elected to field.

== Division One ==
2025 ICC Women's T20 World Cup Africa Qualifier Division One
- Dates: 31 August – 6 September 2025
- Administrator: African Cricket Association
- Cricket format: Twenty20 International
- Host: Namibia
- Champions: Zimbabwe
- Runners-up: Namibia
- Participants: 8
- Matches: 20
- Player of the series: (Nigeria) Lucky Piety
- Most runs: (Nigeria) Lucky Piety (198)
- Most wickets: (Kenya) Melvin Khagiotsa (11)

=== Squads ===
Kenya	Namibia	Nigeria	Rwanda	Sierra Leone	Tanzania	Uganda	Zimbabwe
Esther Wachira (c); Queentor Abel; Veronica Abuga; Josephine Abwom; Ruth Achando (wk); Lavendah Idambo; Melvin Khagoitsa; Jemimah Ndanu; Monicah Ndhambi; Judith Ogolla; Venasa Ooko; Ann Wanjira	Sune Wittmann (c); Jurriene Diergaardt; Merczerly Gorases; Kayleen Green; Victoria Hamunyela; Evelyn Kejarukua; Yasmeen Khan (wk); Mekeleya Mwatile; Wilka Mwatile; Sylvia Shihepo; Saima Tuhadeleni; Edelle van Zyl	Peculiar Agboya (c); Sarah Etim (vc, wk); Adeshola Adekunle; Annointed Akhigbe; Muhibat Amusa; Christabel Chukwuonye; Omosigho Eguakun; Victory Igbinedion; Oseyande Omonkhobhio; Usen Peace; Lucky Piety; Rachael Samson; Salome Sunday; Lillian Udeh	Marie Bimenyimana (c); Alice Ikuzwe; Flora Irakoze (wk); Rosine Irera; Gisele Ishimwe; Henriette Ishimwe; Immaculee Muhawenimana; Belise Murekatete; Shakila Niyomuhoza; Rosette Shimwamana; Clarrisse Umutoniwase; Sylvia Usabyimana; Geovanis Uwase; Merveille Uwase (wk)	Aminata Kamara (c); Aisha Bangura; Celina Bull; Linda Bull; Fatu Conteh (wk); Alice Fillie; Ann Marie Kamara; Emma Kamara; Zainab Kamara (wk); Fatu Pessima; Patrica Pratt; Hassanatu Sawaneh; Hussainatu Sawanneh; Marie Turay	Shufaa Mohamedi (c, wk); Saum Borakambi; Sophia Jerome; Perice Kamunya; Fatuma Kibasu; Jenifer Kimaro; Sheila Kizito; Nasra Mohamedi; Saum Mtae; Hudaa Omary; Neema Pius; Agnes Qwele; Nasra Saidi; Mwanamvua Ushanga	Janet Mbabazi (c); Sarah Akiteng; Proscovia Alako; Naume Amongin; Kevin Amuge; Malisa Ariokot; Concy Aweko; Kevin Awino (wk); Esther Iloku; Phiona Kulume; Rita Musamali; Irene Mutoni; Immaculate Nakisuuyi; Stephani Nampiina	Chipo Mugeri-Tiripano (c); Beloved Biza; Christabel Chatonzwa; Kudzai Chigora; Francisca Chipare; Chiedza Dhururu; Nyasha Gwanzura; Lindokuhle Mabhero; Modester Mupachikwa; Kelis Ndhlovu; Josephine Nkomo; Nomvelo Sibanda; Loreen Tshuma; Adel Zimunu

=== Group A ===
==== Points table ====
Pos	Team	Pld	W	L	NR	Pts	NRR	Qualification
1	Zimbabwe	3	3	0	0	6	2.173	Advanced to the semi-finals
2	Namibia	3	2	1	0	4	3.377	Advanced to the semi-finals
3	Nigeria	3	1	2	0	2	0.040	Advanced to the play-offs
4	Sierra Leone	3	0	3	0	0	−5.442	Advanced to the play-offs

Source: ESPNcricinfo

==== Fixtures ====
31 August 2025
09:30
Scorecard

Nigeria; 182/3 (20 overs)	v	Sierra Leone; 86/8 (20 overs)
Lucky Piety 68 (36); Celina Bull 1/27 (4 overs)		Emma Kamara 31 (25); Rachael Samson 1/8 (3 overs)

Nigeria won by 96 runs
Namibia Cricket Ground, Windhoek
Umpires: Lauren Agenbag (SA) and Patric Makumbi (Uga)
Player of the match: Lucky Piety (Nga)

- Sierra Leone won the toss and elected to field.

31 August 2025
14:30
Scorecard

Zimbabwe; 133/5 (20 overs)	v	Namibia; 101/8 (20 overs)
Chipo Mugeri-Tiripano 39* (31); Sune Wittmann 2/11 (4 overs)		Wilka Mwatile 24* (14); Nyasha Gwanzura 3/4 (4 overs)

Zimbabwe won by 32 runs
Namibia Cricket Ground, Windhoek
Umpires: Kerrin Klaaste (SA) and David Odhiambo (Ken)
Player of the match: Beloved Biza (Zim)

- Namibia won the toss and elected to field.

1 September 2025
09:30
Scorecard

Sierra Leone; 93/9 (20 overs)	v	Zimbabwe; 94/0 (12 overs)
Celina Bull 26 (34); Josephine Nkomo 3/27 (4 overs)		Modester Mupachikwa 51* (40)

Zimbabwe won by 10 wickets
Namibia Cricket Ground, Windhoek
Umpires: Claus Schumacher (Nam) and Isaac Oyieko (Ken)
Player of the match: Nyasha Gwanzura (Zim)

- Sierra Leone won the toss and elected to bat.

1 September 2025
14:30
Scorecard

Nigeria; 70 (18.4 overs)	v	Namibia; 71/2 (9.5 overs)
Salome Sunday 22 (28); Saima Tuhadeleni 3/13 (3.4 overs)		Yasmeen Khan 51* (30); Muhibat Amusa 1/10 (2 overs)

Namibia won by 8 wickets
Namibia Cricket Ground, Windhoek
Umpires: Sarah Dambanevana (Zim) and Patric Makumbi (Uga)
Player of the match: Yasmeen Khan (Nam)

- Nigeria won the toss and elected to bat.

3 September 2025
09:30
Scorecard

Namibia; 228/1 (20 overs)	v	Sierra Leone; 76 (19.5 overs)
Kayleen Green 86* (57); Celina Bull 1/37 (4 overs)		Emma Kamara 24 (34); Saima Tuhadeleni 3/12 (3.5 overs)

Namibia won by 152 runs
High Performance Oval, Windhoek
Umpires: Sarah Dambanevana (Zim) and David Odhiambo (Ken)
Player of the match: Kayleen Green (Nam)

- Namibia won the toss and elected to bat.

3 September 2025
14:30
Scorecard

Nigeria; 90 (19.5 overs)	v	Zimbabwe; 93/0 (14.2 overs)
Sarah Etim 25 (22); Josephine Nkomo 5/6 (4 overs)		Kelis Ndhlovu 44* (46)

Zimbabwe won by 10 wickets
High Performance Oval, Windhoek
Umpires: Ewoud Lassen (Nam) and Isaac Oyieko (Ken)
Player of the match: Josephine Nkomo (Zim)

- Nigeria won the toss and elected to bat.
- Josephine Nkomo (Zim) took her first five-wicket haul in T20Is.

=== Group B ===
==== Points table ====
Pos	Team	Pld	W	L	NR	Pts	NRR	Qualification
1	Tanzania	3	3	0	0	6	0.817	Advanced to the semi-finals
2	Uganda	3	2	1	0	4	0.536	Advanced to the semi-finals
3	Rwanda	3	1	2	0	2	−0.545	Advanced to the play-offs
4	Kenya	3	0	3	0	0	−0.795	Advanced to the play-offs

Source: ESPNcricinfo

==== Fixtures ====
31 August 2025
09:30
Scorecard

Kenya; 103/6 (20 overs)	v	Rwanda; 106/4 (19 overs)
Esther Wachira 53* (58); Rosine Irera 1/12 (3 overs)		Marie Bimenyimana 48* (63); Ann Wanjira 1/10 (2 overs)

Rwanda won by 6 wickets
High Performance Oval, Windhoek
Umpires: Claus Schumacher (Nam) and Sarah Dambanevana (Zim)
Player of the match: Marie Bimenyimana (Rwa)

- Kenya won the toss and elected to bat.

31 August 2025
14:30
Scorecard

Tanzania; 121/7 (20 overs)	v	Uganda; 120/5 (20 overs)
Saum Mtae 39 (40); Irene Mutoni 1/15 (3 overs)		Esther Iloku 49 (55); Sophia Jerome 2/8 (2 overs)

Tanzania won by 1 run
High Performance Oval, Windhoek
Umpires: Ewoud Lassen (Nam) and Isaac Oyieko (Ken)
Player of the match: Esther Iloku (Uga)

- Uganda won the toss and elected to field.
- Naume Amongin (Uga) made her T20I debut.

1 September 2025
09:30
Scorecard

Tanzania; 125/8 (20 overs)	v	Kenya; 95 (19.5 overs)
Saum Mtae 30 (19); Melvin Khagoitsa 5/13 (4 overs)		Lavendah Idambo 18 (11); Agnes Qwele 3/10 (3.5 overs)

Tanzania won by 30 runs
High Performance Oval, Windhoek
Umpires: Kerrin Klaaste (SA) and Ewoud Lassen (Nam)
Player of the match: Melvin Khagoitsa (Ken)

- Tanzania won the toss and elected to bat.

1 September 2025
14:30
Scorecard

Rwanda; 114 (19.5 overs)	v	Uganda; 116/2 (16.3 overs)
Gisele Ishimwe 41 (33); Irene Mutoni 2/18 (3 overs)		Rita Musamali 47* (37); Rosine Irera 1/7 (4 overs)

Uganda won by 8 wickets
High Performance Oval, Windhoek
Umpires: Lauren Agenbag (SA) and David Odhiambo (Nam)
Player of the match: Immaculate Nakisuuyi (Uga)

- Rwanda won the toss and elected to bat.

3 September 2025
09:30
Scorecard

Tanzania; 123/4 (20 overs)	v	Rwanda; 105/8 (20 overs)
Hudaa Omary 54* (46)		Shakila Niyomuhoza 31 (26); Nasra Saidi 3/26 (4 overs)

Tanzania won by 18 runs
Namibia Cricket Ground, Windhoek
Umpires: Kerrin Klaaste (SA) and Patric Makumbi (Uga)
Player of the match: Hudaa Omary (Tan)

- Rwanda won the toss and elected to field.

3 September 2025
14:30
Scorecard

Kenya; 107/8 (20 overs)	v	Uganda; 108/2 (18.4 overs)
Venasa Ooko 41* (32); Concy Aweko 2/12 (4 overs)		Janet Mbabazi 63* (61); Melvin Khagoitsa 1/22 (4 overs)

Uganda won by 8 wickets
Namibia Cricket Ground, Windhoek
Umpires: Lauren Agenbag (SA) and Claus Schumacher (Nam)
Player of the match: Janet Mbabazi (Uga)

- Uganda won the toss and elected to field.

=== Play-offs ===
5th place semi-final 1
4 September 2025
09:30
Scorecard

Kenya; 105/7 (20 overs)	v	Nigeria; 98 (18.5 overs)
Monicah Ndhambi 24 (31); Lucky Piety 2/26 (4 overs)		Lucky Piety 35 (29); Melvin Khagoitsa 4/16 (4 overs)

Kenya won by 7 runs
High Performance Oval, Windhoek
Umpires: Patric Makumbi (Uga) and Claus Schumacher (Nam)
Player of the match: Melvin Khagoitsa (Ken)

- Kenya won the toss and elected to bat.

5th place semi-final 2
4 September 2025
14:30
Scorecard

Rwanda; 162/5 (20 overs)	v	Sierra Leone; 112/6 (20 overs)
Gisele Ishimwe 43 (39); Linda Bull 2/28 (3 overs)		Celina Bull 41* (35); Sylvia Usabyimana 1/11 (2 overs)

Rwanda won by 50 runs
High Performance Oval, Windhoek
Umpires: David Odhiambo (Ken) and Ewoud Lassen (Nam)
Player of the match: Gisele Ishimwe (Rwa)

- Rwanda won the toss and elected to bat.

7th place play-off
6 September 2025
09:30
Scorecard

Nigeria; 159/4 (20 overs)	v	Sierra Leone; 74/9 (20 overs)
Lucky Piety 92 (60); Alice Fillie 1/7 (1 over)		Emma Kamara 15 (14); Lucky Piety 4/10 (4 overs)

Nigeria won by 85 runs
High Performance Oval, Windhoek
Umpires: David Odhiambo (Ken) and Isaac Oyieko (Ken)
Player of the match: Lucky Piety (Nga)

- Nigeria won the toss and elected to bat.

5th place play-off
6 September 2025
14:30
Scorecard

Rwanda; 122/5 (20 overs)	v	Kenya; 116/6 (20 overs)
Marie Bimenyimana 33 (33); Jemimah Ndanu 2/27 (4 overs)		Queentor Abel 62* (41); Henriette Ishimwe 3/30 (4 overs)

Rwanda won by 6 runs
High Performance Oval, Windhoek
Umpires: Patric Makumbi (Uga) and Claus Schumacher (Nam)
Player of the match: Henriette Ishimwe (Rwa)

- Rwanda won the toss and elected to bat.

=== Finals ===
Semi-final 1
4 September 2025
09:30
Scorecard

Uganda; 119/7 (20 overs)	v	Zimbabwe; 120/5 (17.4 overs)
Janet Mbabazi 29 (23); Nyasha Gwanzura 2/17 (4 overs)		Modester Mupachikwa 25 (25); Janet Mbabazi 2/17 (4 overs)

Zimbabwe won by 5 wickets
Namibia Cricket Ground, Windhoek
Umpires: Kerrin Klaaste (SA) and Isaac Oyieko (Ken)
Player of the match: Nyasha Gwanzura (Zim)

- Zimbabwe won the toss and elected to field.

Semi-final 2
4 September 2025
14:30
Scorecard

Tanzania; 74/8 (20 overs)	v	Namibia; 77/2 (13.5 overs)
Hudaa Omary 26 (37); Jurriene Diergaardt 2/8 (4 overs)		Mekeleya Mwatile 43* (38); Agnes Qwele 1/10 (3 overs)

Namibia won by 8 wickets
Namibia Cricket Ground, Windhoek
Umpires: Lauren Agenbag (SA) and Sarah Dambanevana (Zim)
Player of the match: Mekeleya Mwatile (Nam)

- Tanzania won the toss and elected to bat.

3rd place play-off
6 September 2025
09:30
Scorecard

Tanzania; 109/5 (20 overs)	v	Uganda; 103 (19.4 overs)
Hudaa Omary 45* (34); Concy Aweko 2/14 (4 overs)		Esther Iloku 45 (45); Nasra Saidi 3/20 (3.4 overs)

Tanzania won by 6 runs
Namibia Cricket Ground, Windhoek
Umpires: Sarah Dambanevana (Zim) and Ewoud Lassen (Nam)
Player of the match: Nasra Saidi (Tan)

- Tanzania won the toss and elected to bat.

Final
6 September 2025
14:30
Scorecard

Namibia; 115/7 (20 overs)	v	Zimbabwe; 116/1 (16.3 overs)
Kayleen Green 48 (47); Beloved Biza 2/12 (3 overs)		Kelis Ndhlovu 70* (52); Saimi Tuhadeleni 1/18 (3.3 overs)

Zimbabwe won by 9 wickets
Namibia Cricket Ground, Windhoek
Umpires: Lauren Agenbag (SA) and Kerrin Klaaste (SA)
Player of the match: Kelis Ndhlovu (Zim)

- Zimbabwe won the toss and elected to field.
