= Zambia women's national cricket team =

Cricket team

Zambia
- Flag of Zambia
- Association: Zambia Cricket Union

International Cricket Council
- ICC status: Associate member (2003); Former Member (2021–2025)
- ICC region: Africa

T20 Internationals
- First T20I: v Mozambique at Botswana Cricket Association Oval 1, Gaborone; 6 April 2025
- Last T20I: v Lesotho at Botswana Cricket Association Oval 2, Gaborone; 11 April 2025
T20Is	Played	Won/Lost
Total	7	0/7 (0 ties, 0 no results)
This year	7	0/7 (0 ties, 0 no results)
- As of 11 April 2026

The Zambia women's national cricket team represents Zambia in international women's cricket.

In April 2018, the International Cricket Council (ICC) granted full Women's Twenty20 International (WT20I) status to all its members. Therefore, all Twenty20 matches played between Zambia women and another international side after 1 July 2018 have full WT20I status.

Zambia women's team was part of the Botswana 7s tournament in August 2018 against Botswana, Lesotho, Malawi, Mozambique, Namibia and Sierra Leone. However, Zambia's matches were not classified as WT20Is as they had a Botswana player in their squad.

Zambia had their membership suspended by the International Cricket Council in 2019 due to continued non-compliance to amend multiple breaches of the ICC's Membership Criteria, relating to general competence and an acceptable detailed governance system. With Zambia failing to address the ICC's concerns, their membership was terminated in 2021.

Zambia's membership was formally restored by ICC in 2025.

== Records and statistics ==
International Match Summary — Zambia Women

Last updated 11 April 2026

Playing Record
Format	M	W	L	T	NR	Inaugural Match
Twenty20 Internationals	7	0	7	0	0	6 April 2026

=== Twenty20 International ===
T20I record versus other nations

Records complete to T20I #2721. Last updated 11 April 2026.

Opponent	M	W	L	T	NR	First match	First win
ICC Associate members
Botswana	1	0	1	0	0	8 April 2026	
Brazil	1	0	1	0	0	8 April 2026	
Lesotho	2	0	2	0	0	7 April 2026	
Malawi	2	0	2	0	0	9 April 2026	
Mozambique	1	0	1	0	0	6 April 2026	

== See also ==
- Zambia national cricket team
- List of Zambia women Twenty20 International cricketers
