= List of Zambia women Twenty20 International cricketers =

This is a list of Zambia women Twenty20 International cricketers. A Women's Twenty20 International (WT20I) is an international cricket match between two representative teams. A WT20I is played under the rules of Twenty20 cricket. In April 2018, the International Cricket Council (ICC) granted full international status to Twenty20 women's matches played between member sides from 1 July 2018 onwards. Zambian women's team will play their first WT20I on 6 April 2026 against Mozambique during 2026 BCA Kalahari Tournament.

This list will comprise all members of the Cameroon women's cricket team who have played at least one T20I match. It is initially arranged in the order in which each player won her first Twenty20 cap. Where more than one player will win her first Women's Twenty20 cap in the same match, those players will be listed alphabetically by surname (according to the name format used by Cricinfo).

== Key ==
General

- ‡ – Captain
- † – Wicket-keeper
- First – Year of debut
- Last – Year of latest game
- Mat – Number of matches played

Batting

- Runs – Runs scored in career
- HS – Highest score
- Avg – Runs scored per dismissal
- * – Batsman remained not out
- 50 – Half-centuries scored
- 100 – Centuries scored

Bowling

- Balls – Balls bowled in career
- Wkt – Wickets taken in career
- BBI – Best bowling in an innings
- Ave – Average runs per wicket

Fielding

- Ca – Catches taken
- St – Stumpings affected

== List of players ==
Last updated 11 April 2026.

General					Batting				Bowling				Fielding		Ref
No.	Name	First	Last	Mat	Runs	HS	Avg	50	Balls	Wkt	BBI	Ave	Ca	St	Ref
1	Mwansa Chabula	2026	2026	7	13	9*	2.60	0	136	5	1/12	23.60	0	0	
2	Nancy Chabula‡	2026	2026	7	23	8	3.28	0	138	10	3/17	13.00	1	0	
3	Rosemary Chanda	2026	2026	7	16	5	3.20	0	48	0	–	–	2	0	
4	Filo Chenda	2026	2026	7	34	14	4.85	0	6	0	–	–	2	0	
5	Mwake Kachingo	2026	2026	6	6	6	1.20	0	98	3	2/20	38.66	0	0	
6	Esther Malama	2026	2026	6	4	2*	2.00	0	–	–	–	–	0	0	
7	Esther Mulenga	2026	2026	6	5	4	1.25	0	42	1	1/4	60.00	1	0	
8	Peggy Munsanda	2026	2026	6	20	9*	3.66	0	–	–	–	–	1	0	
9	Vivian Mwansa†	2026	2026	5	10	8*	3.33	0	–	–	–	–	0	0	
10	Mercy Nguni	2026	2026	5	18	12*	6.00	0	96	5	2/18	26.80	0	0	
11	Rithika Sriram	2026	2026	5	13	10	4.33	0	66	2	1/15	36.00	0	0	
12	Abigail Kayuni	2026	2026	2	–	–	–	–	6	0	–	–	0	0	
13	Tamara Banda	2026	2026	4	14	8	3.50	0	–	–	–	–	0	0	
14	Patience Chabuta	2026	2026	4	0	0	0.00	0	72	5	2/12	13.00	1	0	
