= Sarah Dambanevana =

Zimbabwean cricket umpire (1990–2026)

Personal information
- Born: 26 May 1990
- Died: 12 October 2026 (aged 36); Harare, Zimbabwe
- Batting: Right-handed
- Bowling: Right-arm fast medium
- Role: Umpire

International information
- National side: Zimbabwe (2009–2014)

Umpiring information
- T20Is umpired: 10 (2023–2024)
- WODIs umpired: 11 (2024–2025)
- WT20Is umpired: 42 (2023–2026)
- FC umpired: 1 (2024)
- LA umpired: 8 (2022–2025)
- T20 umpired: 3 (2025–2026)

Career statistics
Competition	WLA
Matches	4
Runs scored	29
Batting average	14.50
100s/50s	0/0
Top score	12*
Balls bowled	30
Wickets	1
Bowling average	35.00
5 wickets in innings	–
10 wickets in match	–
Best bowling	1/26
Catches/stumpings	0/–
- Source: Cricinfo, 15 September 2024

Sarah Dambanevana (26 May 1990 – 12 October 2026) was a Zimbabwean cricket umpire and international cricketer. She played for the Zimbabwe women's cricket team between 2009 and 2014, including at the 2011 World Cup Qualifier. In 2022, she was added to the Development Panel of ICC Umpires. She was one of the female umpires named by the ICC to stand in matches in the 2024 ICC Women's T20 World Cup. She became the first female Zimbabwean to make her international umpiring debut in the ICC Women's T20 World Cup.

== Cricket career ==
In 2010, she played her first international match for Zimbabwe against Kenya in Women's World Cup Qualifying Series Africa Region on 17 December 2010. She played List A cricket for Zimbabwe women in 2011 Women's Cricket World Cup Qualifier in 2011. She also featured in Zimbabwe women's Regional T20 world cup qualifiers in Tanzania in 2012. In 2013, she played a T20 match for the Zimbabwe women's team against the South Africa Emerging women's team.

== Umpiring career ==
Dambanevana officiated as an on-field umpire in a List A match for the first time on 24 October 2022, in the Pro50 Championship, when she was one of the umpires in the match between Mashonaland Eagles and Mid West Rhinos.

In January 2023, she was selected as a match official for the 2023 Under-19 Women's T20 World Cup. She was one of the on-field umpires in the final and became the first female Zimbabwean umpire to stand in a Cricket World Cup final.

In September 2023, she stood as an on-field umpire in the women's T20I between Botswana and Kenya in the 2023 ICC Women's T20 World Cup Africa Qualifier. In November 2023, she officiated for the first time as an on-field umpire in the men's T20I between Kenya and Rwanda in the 2022–23 ICC Men's T20 World Cup Africa Qualifier. In January 2024, she stood as on-field umpire in the women's ODI between Zimbabwe and Ireland on 18 January 2024.

On 15 February 2024, she became the first Zimbabwean woman umpire to stand as an on-field umpire in a men's domestic fixture in Zimbabwe, when she was one of the umpires in the match between the Eagles and the Mountaineers in the 2023–24 Logan Cup.

== Death ==
Dambanevana died in Harare on 12 October 2026, at the age of 36. She had been in hospital receiving care after undergoing a medical procedure in March.

== See also ==
- List of Twenty20 International cricket umpires
