= List of Lesotho women Twenty20 International cricketers =

This is a list of Lesotho women Twenty20 International cricketers. A Twenty20 International (T20I) is an international Twenty20 cricket match between two representative teams, each having T20I status, as determined by the International Cricket Council (ICC). A T20I is played under the rules of Twenty20 cricket.

This list includes all players who have played at least one T20I match and is initially arranged in the order of debut appearance. Where more than one player won their first cap in the same match, their surnames are initially listed alphabetically at the time of debut.

== Key ==
General

- ‡ – Captain
- † – Wicket-keeper
- First – Year of debut
- Last – Year of latest game
- Mat – Number of matches played

Batting

- Runs – Runs scored in career
- HS – Highest score
- Avg – Runs scored per dismissal
- * – Batter remained not out
- 50 – Number of half centuries

Bowling

- Wkt – Wickets taken in career
- BBI – Best bowling in an innings
- Ave – Average runs per wicket

Fielding

- Ca – Catches taken
- St – Stumpings affected

== Players ==
Statistics are correct as of 11 April 2026.

General					Batting				Bowling				Fielding		Ref
No.	Name	First	Last	Mat	Runs	HS	Avg	50	Balls	Wkt	BBI	Ave	Ca	St	Ref
1	Tshepang Khabo	2018	2026	19	93	31	5.47	0	72	1	1/23	112.00	4	0	
2	Rethabie Khasana	2018	2018	5	13	6	3.25	0	60	4	2/23	22.25	1	0	
3	Thandi Kobeli‡†	2018	2025	18	67	17	3.94	0	90	3	1/20	44.00	4	0	
4	Tharollo Koloi	2018	2018	5	3	2	1.00	0	78	1	1/29	120.00	0	0	
5	Boitumelo Lekau	2018	2018	5	6	3	1.50	0	114	4	2/23	38.50	1	0	
6	Mpitsoane Matobole	2018	2018	2	6	6	3.00	0	12	1	1/20	20.00	0	0	
7	Majane Moalosi	2018	2018	6	28	14	9.33	0	–	–	–	–	1	0	
8	Paballo Pheko†	2018	2026	20	68	11	3.77	0	–	–	–	–	6	1	
9	Boitumelo Phelenyane‡	2018	2026	24	83	27	3.95	0	416	19	3/14	24.63	5	0	
10	Tanki Ramabitsa	2018	2025	11	31	11	3.44	0	210	11	2/12	21.09	2	0	
11	Matsooana Tsarsi	2018	2018	5	62	31*	20.66	0	–	–	–	–	0	0	
12	Limpho Khotso	2018	2018	4	0	0	0.00	0	42	0	–	–	0	0	
13	Mathuto Mohasane	2018	2024	6	12	6	3.00	0	–	–	–	–	0	0	
14	Nthati Tsiame	2018	2018	1	1	1	1.00	0	–	–	–	–	0	0	
15	Ret'sepile Limema	2023	2026	22	15	4	1.50	0	298	16	3/21	23.68	1	0	
16	Makopano Mabathoana	2023	2026	20	31	7	1.72	0	90	3	2/30	63.00	0	0	
17	Thato Mahe	2023	2026	10	31	21	3.10	0	42	1	1/33	76.00	1	0	
18	Nana Mokhachane	2023	2024	10	4	3	1.00	0	199	11	3/25	26.36	0	0	
19	Mamothepane Mokoatsela	2023	2024	9	19	9	2.37	0	–	–	–	–	0	0	
20	Kananelo Molapo†	2023	2026	22	154	29*	7.33	0	–	–	–	–	4	1	
21	Maneo Nyabela‡	2023	2026	22	99	19	4.95	0	447	22	3/6	21.68	5	0	
22	Kananelo Phohlo	2023	2023	3	3	3	1.00	0	–	–	–	–	0	0	
23	Mosa Tsemane	2023	2025	13	11	3	1.22	0	162	2	1/22	104.00	5	0	
24	Khahliso Damane	2023	2023	1	10	10	10.00	0	–	–	–	–	0	0	
25	Kekhotsofetse Mohanoe	2024	2024	5	19	14	4.75	0	–	–	–	–	0	0	
26	Kananelo Mabitle	2024	2026	2	0	0	0.00	0	–	–	–	–	0	0	
27	Domkwezana Mokoatsela	2024	2024	1	1	1	1.00	0	12	0	–	–	0	0	
28	Boitumelo Tlali	2025	2026	12	56	12	5.09	0	255	12	4/10	14.33	2	0	
29	Nthatuoa Thekiso	2025	2026	7	12	5	2.00	0	–	–	–	–	0	0	
30	Lindiwe Polaki	2026	2026	7	6	2	1.20	0	87	4	2/43	24.50	0	0	
31	Bonolo Mosoaboli	2026	2026	6	5	3*	5.00	0	54	1	1/29	55.00	0	0	
32	Lerato Mating	2026	2026	3	11	7*	5.50	0	–	–	–	–	0	0	
33	Teboho Mosobela	2026	2026	1	1	1	1.00	0	–	–	–	–	0	0	
34	Mosenyehi Mohapi	2026	2026	1	8	8	8.00	0	–	–	–	–	0	0	
