= Sierra Leone women's national cricket team =

Cricket team

Sierra Leone
- Flag of Sierra Leone
- Association: Cricket Sierra Leone

Personnel
- Captain: Fatmata Parkinson
- Coach: Sarah Johnson

International Cricket Council
- ICC status: Associate member (2017); Affiliate member (2002)
- ICC region: Africa
ICC Rankings	Current	Best-ever
T20I	39th	30th (6 Feb 2019)

T20 Internationals
- First T20I: v. Mozambique at Botswana Cricket Association Oval, Gaborone; 20 August 2018
- Last T20I: v. Nigeria at High Performance Oval, Windhoek; 6 September 2025
T20Is	Played	Won/Lost
Total	58	27/31 (0 ties, 0 no results)
This year	0	0/0 (0 ties, 0 no results)
- As of 6 September 2025

The Sierra Leone women's national cricket team represents Sierra Leone in international women's cricket.

In 2011 Sierra Leone was invited to the Africa Twenty20 Women's Tournament held in Uganda. The team participated in the inaugural 2015 North West Africa Cricket Council (NWACC) women's tournament held in The Gambia. The team finished undefeated at the tournament ahead of Gambia, Ghana and Mali.

In April 2018, the International Cricket Council (ICC) granted full Women's Twenty20 International (WT20I) status to all its members. Therefore, all Twenty20 matches played between Sierra Leone women and another international side since 1 July 2018 have the WT20I status.

Sierra Leone's first WT20I matches were contested as part of the Botswana 7s tournament in August 2018 against Botswana, Lesotho, Malawi, Mozambique, Namibia and Zambia (matches against Zambia did not have WT20I status). Sierra Leone finished second on the table, with four wins and one loss and lost the final against Namibia by nine wickets.

In December 2020, the ICC announced the qualification pathway for the 2023 ICC Women's T20 World Cup. Sierra Leone were named in the 2021 ICC Women's T20 World Cup Africa Qualifier regional group, alongside ten other teams.

== Records and statistics ==
International Match Summary — Sierra Leone Women

Last updated 6 September 2025

Playing Record
Format	M	W	L	T	NR	Inaugural Match
Twenty20 Internationals	58	27	31	0	0	26 January 2019

=== Twenty20 International ===
- Highest team total: 173/6 v Eswatini on 5 September 2023 at Gaborone Oval 2, Gaborone.
- Highest individual score: 84*, Ann Marie Kamara v Lesotho on 24 August 2018 at Gaborone Oval 1, Gaborone.
- Best individual bowling figures: 4/7, Zainab Kamara v Mozambique on 20 August 2018 at Gaborone Oval 1, Gaborone.

T20I record versus other nations

Records complete to WT20I #2484. Last updated 6 September 2025.

Opponent	M	W	L	T	NR	First match	First win
ICC Full Members
Zimbabwe	1	0	1	0	0	1 September 2025	
ICC Associate members
Botswana	6	5	1	0	0	23 August 2018	23 August 2018
Brazil	1	0	1	0	0	12 June 2025	
Cameroon	6	5	1	0	0	15 September 2021	15 September 2021
Eswatini	4	4	0	0	0	5 September 2023	5 September 2023
Gambia	1	1	0	0	0	2 April 2022	2 April 2022
Ghana	3	3	0	0	0	29 March 2022	29 March 2022
Kenya	1	0	1	0	0	6 May 2019	
Lesotho	1	1	0	0	0	24 August 2018	24 August 2018
Malawi	3	3	0	0	0	23 August 2018	23 August 2018
Mozambique	5	5	0	0	0	20 August 2018	20 August 2018
Namibia	5	0	5	0	0	21 August 2018	
Nigeria	8	0	8	0	0	9 September 2021	
Rwanda	7	0	7	0	0	30 March 2022	
Tanzania	3	0	3	0	0	28 February 2024	
Uganda	3	0	3	0	0	5 May 2019	

== Tournament history ==
=== ICC Women's ODI World Cup ===
Women's Cricket World Cup records
Host Year	Round	Position	GP	W	L	T	NR
(England) 1973	Did not qualified						
(India) 1978	Did not qualified						
(New Zealand) 1982	Did not qualified						
(Australia) 1988	Did not qualified						
(England) 1993	Did not qualified						
(India) 1997	Did not qualified						
(New Zealand) 2000	Did not qualified						
(South Africa) 2005	Did not qualified						
(Australia) 2009	Did not qualified						
(India) 2013	Did not qualified						
(England) 2017	Did not qualified						
(New Zealand) 2022	Did not qualified						
(India) 2025	Did not qualified						
Total	0/13	0 Titles	0	0	0	0	0

=== ICC Women's World T20 ===
Twenty20 World Cup records
Host Year	Round	Position	GP	W	L	T	NR
(England) 2009	Did not qualify						
(Cricket West Indies) 2010	Did not qualify						
(Sri Lanka) 2012	Did not qualify						
(Bangladesh) 2014	Did not qualify						
(India) 2016	Did not qualify						
(Cricket West Indies) 2018	Did not qualify						
(Australia) 2020	Did not qualify						
(South Africa) 2023	Did not qualify						
(United Arab Emirates) 2024	Did not qualify						
(England) 2026	Did not qualify						
Total	0/10	0 Titles	0	0	0	0	0

=== ICC Women's Cricket World Cup Qualifier ===
ICC Women's Cricket World Cup Qualifier records
Host Year	Round	Position	GP	W	L	T	NR
(Netherlands) 2003	Did not qualify						
(South Africa) 2008	Did not qualify						
(Bangladesh) 2011	Did not qualify						
(Sri Lanka) 2017	Did not qualify						
(Zimbabwe) 2021	Did not qualify						
(Pakistan) 2025	Did not qualify						
Total	0/5	0 Title	0	0	0	0	0

=== ICC Women's World Twenty20 Global Qualifier ===
ICC Women's World Twenty20 Qualifier records
Host Year	Round	Position	GP	W	L	T	NR
(Republic of Ireland) 2013	Did not qualify						
(Thailand) 2015	Did not qualify						
(Netherlands) 2018	Did not qualify						
(Scotland) 2019	Did not qualify						
(United Arab Emirates) 2022	Did not qualify						
(United Arab Emirates) 2024	Did not qualify						
(Nepal) 2026	Did not qualify						
Total	0/7	0 Titles	0	0	0	0	0

=== ICC Women's T20 Champions Trophy ===
ICC Women's T20 Champions Trophy records
Host Year	Round	Position	GP	W	L	T	NR
(Sri Lanka) 2027	To be determined						
2031	To be determined						
Total	–	0 Title	0	0	0	0	0

=== Cricket at the African Games ===
Cricket at the African Games records
Host Year	Round	Position	GP	W	L	T	NR
(Ghana) 2023	Did not participate						
(Egypt) 2027	To be determined						
(Democratic Republic of the Congo) 2031	To be determined						
Total	0/1	0 Title	5	2	2	0	1

=== ICC Women's T20 World Cup Africa Qualifier ===
Women's T20 World Cup Qualifier records
Year	Round	Position	GP	W	L	T	NR
(Zimbabwe) 2019	DNQ	–	3	0	3	0	0
(Botswana) 2021	DNQ	–	4	1	3	0	0
Total	2/2	0 Title	7	1	6	0	0

=== ICC Women's T20 World Cup Africa Qualifier Division One ===
ICC Women's T20 World Cup Africa Qualifier Division One records
Year	Round	Position	GP	W	L	T	NR
(Botswana) 2025	DNQ	8/8	5	0	5	0	0
Total	1/1	0 Title	5	0	5	0	0

=== ICC Women's T20 World Cup Africa Qualifier Division Two ===
ICC Women's T20 World Cup Africa Qualifier Division Two records
Year	Round	Position	GP	W	L	T	NR
(Botswana) 2023	Semi-finals	–	4	3	1	0	0
(Botswana) 2025	Runners-up	–	5	4	1	0	0
Total	2/2	0 Title	9	7	2	0	0

=== Kwibuka Women's T20 Tournament ===
Kwibuka T20 Tournament records
Year	Round	Position	GP	W	L	T	NR
(Rwanda) 2014	Did not participate						
(Rwanda) 2015	Did not participate						
(Rwanda) 2016	Did not participate						
(Rwanda) 2017	Did not participate						
(Rwanda) 2018	Did not participate						
(Rwanda) 2019	Did not participate						
(Rwanda) 2021	Did not participate						
(Rwanda) 2022	Did not participate						
(Rwanda) 2023	Did not participate						
(Rwanda) 2024	Round-robin	8/8	7	0	7	0	0
(Rwanda) 2025	Round-robin	9/9	8	1	7	0	0
Total	2/11	0 Title	15	1	15	0	0

== See also ==
- List of Sierra Leone women Twenty20 International cricketers
