= Lesotho women's national cricket team =

Cricket team

Lesotho
- Flag of Lesotho
- Association: Lesotho Cricket Association

Personnel
- Captain: Maneo Nyabela

International Cricket Council
- ICC status: Associate member (2017); Affiliate member (2001)
- ICC region: Africa
ICC Rankings	Current	Best-ever
T20I	69th	45th (4 Feb 2019)

T20 Internationals
- First T20I: Botswana at Botswana Cricket Association Oval 1, Gaborone; 20 August 2018
- Last T20I: Zambia at Botswana Cricket Association Oval 2, Gaborone; 11 April 2026
T20Is	Played	Won/Lost
Total	28	3/25 (0 ties, 0 no results)
This year	7	2/5 (0 ties, 0 no results)
- As of 11 April 2026

The Lesotho women's national cricket team represents Lesotho in women's cricket matches.

In April 2018, the International Cricket Council (ICC) granted full Women's Twenty20 International (WT20I) status to all its members. Therefore, all Twenty20 matches played between Lesotho women and other ICC members after 1 July 2018 have the full WT20I status.

Lesotho's first WT20I matches were contested as part of the Botswana 7s tournament in August 2018 against Botswana, Malawi, Mozambique, Namibia, Sierra Leone and Zambia (Zambia's matches were not classified as WT20Is as they had a Botswanan player in their squad). Lesotho finished bottom of the table, losing all five group matches and lose the fifth place play off against Malawi by a margin of nine wickets.

== Records and statistics ==
International Match Summary — Lesotho Women

Last updated 11 April 2026

Playing Record
Format	M	W	L	T	NR	Inaugural Match
Twenty20 Internationals	28	3	25	0	0	20 August 2018

=== Twenty20 International ===
- Highest team total: 87 v Mozambique, 21 August 2018, at Botswana Cricket Association Oval 2, Gaborone.
- Highest individual score: 31*, Matsooana Tsarsi v Malawi, 21 August 2018, at Botswana Cricket Association Oval 2, Gaborone.
- Best individual bowling figures: 3/21, Maneo Nyabela v Mozambique, 22 April 2024, at Botswana Cricket Association Oval 1, Gaborone.

T20I record versus other nations

Records complete to WT20I #2721. Last updated 11 April 2026.

Opponent	M	W	L	T	NR	First match	First win
ICC Associate members
Botswana	5	0	5	0	0	20 August 2018	
Brazil	1	0	1	0	0	9 April 2026	
Cameroon	1	0	1	0	0	21 July 2025	
Eswatini	1	1	0	0	0	26 July 2025	26 July 2025
Kenya	1	0	1	0	0	5 September 2023	
Malawi	6	0	6	0	0	21 August 2018	
Mozambique	6	0	6	0	0	21 August 2018	
Namibia	1	0	1	0	0	23 August 2018	
Rwanda	3	0	3	0	0	22 April 2024	
Sierra Leone	1	0	1	0	0	24 August 2018	
Zambia	2	2	0	0	0	7 April 2026	7 April 2026

== See also ==
- List of Lesotho women Twenty20 International cricketers
