= Botswana women's national cricket team =

Cricket team from Botswana

Botswana
- Association: Botswana Cricket Association

Personnel
- Captain: Laura Mophakedi
- Coach: Karabo Motlhanka

International Cricket Council
- ICC status: Associate member (2005); Affiliate member (2001)
- ICC region: Africa
ICC Rankings	Current	Best-ever
T20I	49th	28th (4 Jan 2019)

T20 Internationals
- First T20I: v Lesotho at Botswana Cricket Association Oval 1, Gaborone; 20 August 2018
- Last T20I: v Brazil at Botswana Cricket Association Oval 1, Gaborone; 11 April 2026
T20Is	Played	Won/Lost
Total	83	29/53 (1 tie, 0 no results)
This year	8	4/4 (0 ties, 0 no results)
- As of 11 April 2026

The Botswana women's national cricket team represents Botswana in women's cricket matches. The team is currently coached by Karabo Motlhanka.

In April 2018, the International Cricket Council (ICC) granted full Women's Twenty20 International (WT20I) status to all its members. Therefore, all Twenty20 matches played between Botswana women and other ICC members since 1 July 2018 have the full WT20I status.

Botswana's first WT20I matches were contested as part of the Botswana 7s tournament in August 2018 against Lesotho, Malawi, Mozambique, Namibia, Sierra Leone and Zambia (Zambia's matches were not classified as WT20Is as they had a Botswanan player in their squad). Botswana finished third on the table with three wins and two losses and won the third place play-off against Mozambique by nine wickets.

In December 2020, the ICC announced the qualification pathway for the 2023 ICC Women's T20 World Cup. The Botswana women's team are scheduled to make their debut at an ICC women's event when they play in the 2021 ICC Women's T20 World Cup Africa Qualifier group.

== Squad ==
Updated on 26 April 2024

This lists all the players who played for Botswana in the past 12 months or were named in the most recent squad.

Name	Age	Batting style	Bowling style	Notes
Batters
Oratile Kgeresi	24	Right-handed	Right-arm medium	
Pako Mapotsane	22	Right-handed	Right-arm medium	
Merapelo Phiase	22	Right-handed	Right-arm medium	
Wendy Moutswi	22	Right-handed	Right-arm off break	
Tebogo Moitoi	23	Right-handed		
Aliya Motorwala	19	Right-handed		
All-rounders
Tuelo Shadrack	26	Right-handed	Right-arm medium	
Goabilwe Matome	27	Right-handed	Right-arm medium	
Amantle Mokgotlhe	24	Right-handed	Right-arm medium	
Florence Samanyika	25	Right-handed	Right-arm medium	
Shameelah Mosweu	30	Right-handed	Right-arm leg break	
Goitseone Setshwane	22	Right-handed	Right-arm off break	
Wicket-keeper
Laura Mophakedi	28	Right-handed		Captain
Bowlers
Onneile Keitsemang	24	Right-handed	Right-arm medium	
Kesego Inakale	21	Right-handed	Right-arm medium	
Lesego Kooagile	19	Right-handed	Right-arm medium	

== Records and statistics ==
International Match Summary — Botswana Women

Last updated 11 April 2026

Playing Record
Format	M	W	L	T	NR	Inaugural Match
Twenty20 Internationals	83	29	53	1	0	20 August 2018

=== Twenty20 International ===
- Highest team total: 224/2 v. Eswatini, 9 September 2021, at Botswana Cricket Association Oval, Gaborone.
- Highest individual score: 86*, Shameelah Mosweu v. Lesotho on 3 September 2023 at Botswana Cricket Association Oval 2, Gaborone.
- Best individual bowling figures: 6/1, Goabilwe Matome v. Lesotho on 3 September 2023 at Botswana Cricket Association Oval 2, Gaborone.

Most T20I runs for Botswana Women

Player	Runs	Average	Career span
Laura Mophakedi	1,289	16.52	2018–2026
Goabilwe Matome	711	15.12	2018–2026
Shameelah Mosweu	589	14.72	2018–2024
Florence Samanyika	569	13.87	2018–2023
Amantle Mokgotlhe	485	12.43	2018–2026

Most T20I wickets for Botswana Women

Player	Wickets	Average	Career span
Goabilwe Matome	78	13.53	2018–2026
Tuelo Shadrack	70	14.55	2018–2026
Shameelah Mosweu	38	16.55	2018–2024
Amantle Mokgotlhe	32	24.84	2018–2026
Florence Samanyika	26	19.92	2018–2023

T20I record versus other nations

Records complete to WT20I #2723. Last updated 11 April 2026.

Opponent	M	W	L	T	NR	First match	First win
ICC Full members
Zimbabwe	2	0	2	0	0	12 September 2021	
ICC Associate members
Brazil	4	0	4	0	0	12 June 2022	
Cameroon	1	1	0	0	0	31 May 2024	31 May 2024
Eswatini	4	4	0	0	0	9 September 2021	9 September 2021
Germany	2	1	1	0	0	14 June 2022	14 June 2022
Kenya	14	1	12	1	0	2 December 2019	3 December 2019
Lesotho	5	5	0	0	0	20 August 2018	20 August 2018
Malawi	5	5	0	0	0	20 August 2018	20 August 2018
Mozambique	10	9	1	0	0	21 August 2018	21 August 2018
Namibia	7	0	7	0	0	24 August 2018	
Nigeria	5	1	4	0	0	10 June 2021	15 June 2023
Rwanda	10	0	10	0	0	6 June 2021	
Sierra Leone	6	1	5	0	0	23 August 2018	6 September 2023
Tanzania	3	0	3	0	0	16 September 2021	
Uganda	4	0	4	0	0	16 June 2022	
Zambia	1	1	0	0	0	8 April 2026	8 April 2026

== Tournament history ==
=== Women's ODI World Cup ===
Women's Cricket World Cup records
Host Year	Round	Position	GP	W	L	T	NR
(England) 1973	Did not qualify/No Women's ODI status						
(India) 1978	Did not qualify/No Women's ODI status						
(New Zealand) 1982	Did not qualify/No Women's ODI status						
(Australia) 1988	Did not qualify/No Women's ODI status						
(England) 1993	Did not qualify/No Women's ODI status						
(India) 1997	Did not qualify/No Women's ODI status						
(New Zealand) 2000	Did not qualify/No Women's ODI status						
(South Africa) 2005	Did not qualify/No Women's ODI status						
(Australia) 2009	Did not qualify/No Women's ODI status						
(India) 2013	Did not qualify/No Women's ODI status						
(England) 2017	Did not qualify/No Women's ODI status						
(New Zealand) 2022	Did not qualify/No Women's ODI status						
(India) 2025	Did not qualify/No Women's ODI status						
Total	0/13	0 Titles	0	0	0	0	0

=== ICC Women's World T20 ===
Twenty20 World Cup records
Host Year	Round	Position	GP	W	L	T	NR
(England) 2009	Did not qualify						
(Cricket West Indies) 2010	Did not qualify						
(Sri Lanka) 2012	Did not qualify						
(Bangladesh) 2014	Did not qualify						
(India) 2016	Did not qualify						
(Cricket West Indies) 2018	Did not qualify						
(Australia) 2020	Did not qualify						
(South Africa) 2023	Did not qualify						
(United Arab Emirates) 2024	Did not qualify						
(England) 2026	To be determined						
Total	–	0 Titles	0	0	0	0	0

=== ICC Women's T20 Champions Trophy ===
ICC Women's T20 Champions Trophy records
Host Year	Round	Position	GP	W	L	T	NR
(Sri Lanka) 2027	To be determined						
2031	To be determined						
Total	–	0 Title	0	0	0	0	0

=== ICC Women's T20 World Cup Africa Qualifier ===
ICC Women's T20 World Cup Africa Qualifier records
Year	Round	Position	GP	W	L	T	NR
(Zimbabwe) 2019	Did not participate						
(Botswana) 2021	Group stages	–	5	2	3	0	0
Total	1/2	0 Title	5	2	3	0	0

=== ICC Women's T20 World Cup Africa Qualifier Division One ===
ICC Women's T20 World Cup Africa Qualifier Division One records
Year	Round	Position	GP	W	L	T	NR
(Uganda) 2023	Group stage	–	3	0	3	0	0
Total	1/1	0 Title	3	0	3	0	0

=== ICC Women's T20 World Cup Africa Qualifier Division Two ===
ICC Women's T20 World Cup Africa Qualifier Division Two records
Year	Round	Position	GP	W	L	T	NR
(Botswana) 2023	Runners-up	–	5	3	2	0	0
(Botswana) 2025	Semi-finals	–	4	2	2	0	0
Total	2/2	0 Title	9	5	4	0	0

== See also ==
- Botswana national cricket team
- List of Botswana women Twenty20 International cricketers
