= Botswana Cricket Association Oval =

Sporting venue in Gaborone, Botswana

Botswana Cricket Association Oval 1
- BCA Oval 1

Ground information
- Location: Gaborone, Botswana
- Capacity: 2,000
- Owner: Botswana Cricket Association
- Operator: Botswana Cricket Association

International information
- First men's T20I: 9 March 2026: Botswana v Lesotho
- Last men's T20I: 15 March 2026: Botswana v Lesotho
- First women's T20I: 20 August 2018: Botswana v Lesotho
- Last women's T20I: 30 April 2025: Botswana v Sierra Leone
- As of 15 March 2026; Source: Oval 1 Cricinfo

Botswana Cricket Association Oval 2
- BCA Oval 2

Ground information

International information
- First women's T20I: 20 August 2018: Malawi v Namibia
- Last women's T20I: 29 April 2025: Eswatini v Mozambique
- As of 29 April 2025; Source: Oval 2 Cricinfo

Botswana Cricket Association (BCA) Oval is a sporting venue in Gaborone, the capital of Botswana. The venue consists of two separate cricket grounds (Oval 1 and Oval 2) in the vicinity of the multi-use University of Botswana Stadium. The grounds have been host to various ICC tournaments like 2011 ICC World Cricket League Division Seven as well as 2013 ICC World Cricket League Division Seven. The BCA Ovals also hosted the 2021 ICC Women's T20 World Cup Africa Qualifier.

There are three cricket grounds in Botswana. The Botswana Cricket Association Oval 2 is the smaller ground and is located next to Botswana Cricket Association Oval 1. BCA Oval 1 is the main ground along with Lobatse Cricket Ground.
