= Mozambique women's national cricket team =

Cricket team

Mozambique
- Mozambican Cricket Association logo
- Association: Mozambican Cricket Association

Personnel
- Captain: Olga Matsolo

International Cricket Council
- ICC status: Associate member (2017); Affiliate member (2003)
- ICC region: Africa
ICC Rankings	Current	Best-ever
T20I	59th	36th (22 Dec 2022)

T20 Internationals
- First T20I: v. Sierra Leone at Botswana Cricket Association Oval 1, Gaborone; 20 August 2018
- Last T20I: v. Malawi at Botswana Cricket Association Oval 2, Gaborone; 11 April 2025
T20Is	Played	Won/Lost
Total	58	24/34 (0 ties, 0 no results)
This year	8	3/5 (0 ties, 0 no results)
- As of 11 April 2026

The Mozambique women's national cricket team represents Mozambique in women's cricket matches.

In April 2018, the International Cricket Council (ICC) granted full Women's Twenty20 International (WT20I) status to all its members. Therefore, all Twenty20 matches played between Mozambique women and other ICC members since 1 July 2018 have the full WT20I status.

Mozambique's first WT20I matches were contested as part of the Botswana 7s tournament in August 2018 against Botswana, Lesotho, Malawi, Namibia, Sierra Leone and Zambia (Zambia's matches were not classified as WT20Is as they had a Botswanan player in their squad). Mozambique finished fourth on the table with two wins and three losses and lost the third-place play-off against Botswana by nine wickets.

In November 2019, Mozambique Women's team participated in T20 Kwacha Cup which was a 7-match bilateral T20I series against Malawi. All the 7 matches were played at Saint Andrews International High School in Blantyre, Malawi. Mozambique women lost the series by 3-4.

In December 2020, the ICC announced the qualification pathway for the 2023 ICC Women's T20 World Cup. Mozambique were named in the 2021 ICC Women's T20 World Cup Africa Qualifier regional group, alongside ten other teams.

== Current Squad ==
Updated as on 26 April 2024

This lists all the players who played for Mozambique in the 2024 BCA Kalahari Women's T20I Tournament.

Name	Age	Batting style	Bowling style	Notes
Batters
Abelina Moiane	21	Right-handed		
Irene Mulhovo	21	Right-handed		
Fernanda Zavala	21	Right-handed		
Olga Mondlane	31			
All-rounders
Cristina Magaia	29	Right-handed	Right-arm medium	Also Wicket-keeper
Isabel Chuma	24	Right-handed	Right-arm medium	
Regina Muzumba	18	Right-handed	Right-arm medium	
Rosalia Haiong	26	Left-handed	Left-arm medium	
Bowlers
Angelica Salomao	27	Right-handed	Right-arm medium	Captain
Amelia Mundundo	18	Right-handed	Right-arm medium	
Laura Chipanga	25	Right-handed	Right-arm medium	
Josefina Sonia	22	Right-handed		

== Records and statistics ==
International Match Summary — Mozambique Women

Last updated 11 April 2026

Playing Record
Format	M	W	L	T	NR	Inaugural Match
Twenty20 Internationals	58	24	34	0	0	20 August 2018

=== Twenty20 International ===
- Highest team total: 219/4 v. Eswatini, 30 July 2022 at Enjabulweni Cricket Ground, Manzini.
- Highest individual score: 71, Olga Mondlane v. Lesotho, 21 August 2018 at Botswana Cricket Association Oval 2, Gaborone.
- Best individual bowling figures: 5/19, Paula Mazuze v. Malawi, 8 November 2019 at Saint Andrews International High School, Blantyre.

Most T20I runs for Mozambique Women

Player	Runs	Average	Career span
Palmira Cuinica	661	16.94	2018–2026
Christina Magaia	496	11.27	2018–2026
Isabel Chuma	421	11.69	2018–2026
Olga Mondlane	389	10.51	2018–2026
Amelia Mundundo	183	8.31	2022–2026

Most T20I wickets for Mozambique Women

Player	Wickets	Average	Career span
Christina Magaia	35	8.00	2018–2026
Palmira Cuinica	35	18.22	2018–2026
Angelica Salomao	32	20.06	2018–2026
Olga Matsolo	25	19.69	2018–2025
Isabel Chuma	24	16.41	2018–2026

T20I record versus other nations

Records complete to T20I #2722. Last updated 11 April 2026.

Opponent	M	W	L	T	NR	First match	First win
ICC Full members
Zimbabwe	2	0	2	0	0	5 January 2019	
ICC Associate members
Botswana	10	1	9	0	0	21 August 2018	7 April 2026
Brazil	2	0	2	0	0	7 April 2026	
Cameroon	2	0	2	0	0	5 September 2023	
Eswatini	12	12	0	0	0	16 September 2021	16 September 2021
Lesotho	6	6	0	0	0	21 August 2018	21 August 2018
Malawi	10	4	6	0	0	24 August 2018	24 August 2018
Namibia	1	0	1	0	0	23 August 2018	
Nigeria	1	0	1	0	0	6 May 2019	
Rwanda	4	0	4	0	0	8 May 2019	
Sierra Leone	5	0	5	0	0	20 August 2018	
Tanzania	2	0	2	0	0	9 May 2019	
Zambia	1	1	0	0	0	6 April 2026	6 April 2026

== Tournament history ==
=== ICC Women's ODI World Cup ===
Women's Cricket World Cup records
Host Year	Round	Position	GP	W	L	T	NR
(England) 1973	Did not qualify/No Women's ODI status						
(India) 1978	Did not qualify/No Women's ODI status						
(New Zealand) 1982	Did not qualify/No Women's ODI status						
(Australia) 1988	Did not qualify/No Women's ODI status						
(England) 1993	Did not qualify/No Women's ODI status						
(India) 1997	Did not qualify/No Women's ODI status						
(New Zealand) 2000	Did not qualify/No Women's ODI status						
(South Africa) 2005	Did not qualify/No Women's ODI status						
(Australia) 2009	Did not qualify/No Women's ODI status						
(India) 2013	Did not qualify/No Women's ODI status						
(England) 2017	Did not qualify/No Women's ODI status						
(New Zealand) 2022	Did not qualify/No Women's ODI status						
(India) 2025	Did not qualify/No Women's ODI status						
Total	0/13	0 Titles	0	0	0	0	0

=== ICC Women's Cricket World Cup Qualifier ===
ICC Women's Cricket World Cup Qualifier records
Host Year	Round	Position	GP	W	L	T	NR
(Netherlands) 2003	Did not qualify/No ODI status						
(South Africa) 2008	Did not qualify/No ODI status						
(Bangladesh) 2011	Did not qualify/No ODI status						
(Sri Lanka) 2017	Did not qualify/No ODI status						
(Zimbabwe) 2021	Did not qualify/No ODI status						
(Pakistan) 2025	Did not qualify/No ODI status						
Total	0/6	0 Title	0	0	0	0	0

=== ICC Women's World T20 ===
Twenty20 World Cup records
Host Year	Round	Position	GP	W	L	T	NR
(England) 2009	Did not qualify						
(Cricket West Indies) 2010	Did not qualify						
(Sri Lanka) 2012	Did not qualify						
(Bangladesh) 2014	Did not qualify						
(India) 2016	Did not qualify						
(Cricket West Indies) 2018	Did not qualify						
(Australia) 2020	Did not qualify						
(South Africa) 2023	Did not qualify						
(United Arab Emirates) 2024	Did not qualify						
(England) 2026	Did not qualify						
Total	0/9	0 Titles	0	0	0	0	0

=== ICC Women's Twenty20 Global Qualifier ===
ICC Women's World Twenty20 Qualifier records
Host Year	Round	Position	GP	W	L	T	NR
(Republic of Ireland) 2013	Did not qualify						
(Thailand) 2015	Did not qualify						
(Netherlands) 2018	Did not qualify						
(Scotland) 2019	Did not qualify						
(United Arab Emirates) 2022	Did not qualify						
(United Arab Emirates) 2024	Did not qualify						
(Nepal) 2026	Did not qualify						
Total	0/7	0 Titles	0	0	0	0	0

=== ICC Women's T20 Champions Trophy ===
ICC Women's T20 Champions Trophy records
Host Year	Round	Position	GP	W	L	T	NR
(Sri Lanka) 2027	To be determined						
2031	To be determined						
Total	–	0 Title	0	0	0	0	0

=== ICC Women's T20 World Cup Africa Qualifier ===
ICC Women's T20 World Cup Africa Qualifier records
Year	Round	Position	GP	W	L	T	NR
(Zimbabwe) 2019	Group stage	–	4	0	4	0	0
(Botswana) 2021	Group stage	–	5	1	4	0	0
Total	2/2	0 Title	9	1	8	0	0

=== ICC Women's T20 World Cup Africa Qualifier Division One ===
ICC Women's T20 World Cup Africa Qualifier Division One records
Year	Round	Position	GP	W	L	T	NR
(Uganda) 2023	Semi-finals	–	3	1	2	0	0
(Botswana) 2025	Knockout stage	5th-Place	5	2	3	0	0
Total	2/2	0 Title	8	3	5	0	0

=== ICC Women's T20 Champions Trophy ===
ICC Women's T20 Champions Trophy records
Host Year	Round	Position	GP	W	L	T	NR
(Sri Lanka) 2027	To be determined						
2031	To be determined						
Total	–	0 Title	0	0	0	0	0

=== Cricket at the African Games ===
Cricket at the African Games records
Host Year	Round	Position	GP	W	L	T	NR
(Ghana) 2023	Did not participate						
(Egypt) 2027	To be determined						
(Democratic Republic of the Congo) 2031	To be determined						
Total	0/1	0 Title	0	0	0	0	0

== See also ==
- List of Mozambique women Twenty20 International cricketers
