= Associate international cricket in 2022–23 =

International cricket season

The 2022–23 Associate international cricket season was from approximately September 2022 to April 2023. All official twenty over matches between Associate members of the ICC were eligible to have full Twenty20 International (T20I) or Women's Twenty20 International (WT20I) status, as the International Cricket Council (ICC) granted T20I status to matches between all of its members from 1 July 2018 (women's teams) and 1 January 2019 (men's teams). The season included all T20I/WT20I cricket series mostly involving ICC Associate members, that were played in addition to series covered in International cricket in 2022–23. The 2023 ACC Men's Challenger Cup and the 2023 ACC Men's Premier Cup, which formed the qualification pathway for the 2023 Asia Cup, were also played during this period.

== Season overview ==
Men's international tours
| Start date | Home team | Away team | Results [Matches] |
| Start date | Home team | Away team | T20I |
|---|---|---|---|
| 9 October 2022 | Japan | Indonesia | 2–1 [3] |
| 31 October 2022 | Tanzania | Rwanda | 5–0 [5] |
| 21 February 2023 | Argentina | Bermuda | 0–2 [2] |
| 24 February 2023 | Spain | Isle of Man | 5–0 [6] |
| 10 April 2023 | Portugal | Gibraltar | 3–0 [3] |
Men's international tournaments
| Start date | Tournament | | Winners |
| 9 September 2022 | (Vanuatu) 2022–23 ICC Men's T20 World Cup EAP Qualifier A | | Vanuatu |
| 15 September 2022 | (South Africa) 2022 ACA Africa T20 Cup | | Uganda |
| 15 October 2022 | (Japan) 2022–23 ICC Men's T20 World Cup EAP Qualifier B | | Japan |
| 20 October 2022 | (Brazil) 2022 South American Championship (Note: Matches at the 2022 Men's South American Championship were played without T20I status.) | | Argentina |
| 4 November 2022 | 2022–23 Spain Tri-Nation Series | | Germany |
| 14 November 2022 | (Oman) 2022 Desert Cup T20I Series | | Canada |
| 17 November 2022 | (Rwanda) 2022–23 ICC Men's T20 World Cup Africa Qualifier A | | Kenya |
| 1 December 2022 | (Rwanda) 2022–23 ICC Men's T20 World Cup Africa Qualifier B | | Tanzania |
| 13 December 2022 | (Rwanda) 2022 East Africa T20 Series | | Uganda |
| 15 December 2022 | 2022–23 Malaysia Quadrangular Series | | Bahrain |
| 24 February 2023 | (Thailand) 2023 ACC Men's Challenger Cup | | Saudi Arabia |
| 25 February 2023 | (Argentina) 2023 ICC Men's T20 World Cup Americas Sub-regional Qualifier | | Bermuda |
| 8 March 2023 | 2022–23 Hong Kong Quadrangular Series | | Hong Kong |
| 11 March 2023 | (Fiji) 2023 Pacific Island Cricket Challenge | | Papua New Guinea XI |
| 18 April 2023 | (Nepal) 2023 ACC Men's Premier Cup | | Nepal |

Women's international tours
| Start date | Home team | Away team | Results [Matches] |
| Start date | Home team | Away team | WT20I |
|---|---|---|---|
| 27 October 2022 | Japan | Hong Kong | 0–4 [4] |
| 4 November 2022 | Indonesia | Singapore | 6–0 [6] |
| 21 December 2022 | Cambodia | Philippines | 5–1 [6] |
| 8 February 2023 | Cambodia | Singapore | 0–5 [5] |
Women's international tournaments
| Start date | Tournament | | Winners |
| 10 September 2022 | 2022 United Arab Emirates Women's Quadrangular Series | | Zimbabwe |
| 18 September 2022 | (United Arab Emirates) 2022 ICC Women's T20 World Cup Qualifier | | Bangladesh |
| 3 October 2022 | (Vanuatu) 2022 Women's Pacific Cup | | Papua New Guinea |
| 13 October 2022 | (Brazil) 2022 South American Championship | | Canada XI (Note: Canada's games did not have WT20I status. They defeated Brazil in the final of the Americas Championship, but their matches did not count towards the South American Championship which was won by Brazil.) |
| 11 November 2022 | 2022 Spain Women's Pentangular Series | | Italy |
| 13 December 2022 | 2022–23 Kenya Women's Quadrangular Series | | Uganda |
| 11 March 2023 | (Fiji) 2023 Pacific Island Cricket Challenge | | Papua New Guinea |
| 27 March 2023 | 2023 Nigeria Invitational Women's T20I Tournament | | Nigeria |
| 18 April 2023 | (Uganda) 2023 Victoria Series | | Uganda |
| 24 April 2023 | (Namibia) 2023 Capricorn Women's Quadrangular Series | | Uganda |

== September ==
=== 2022–23 ICC T20 World Cup EAP Qualifier A ===
| Pos | Team | Pld | W | L | NR | Pts | NRR |
|---|---|---|---|---|---|---|---|
| 1 | Vanuatu | 6 | 5 | 1 | 0 | 10 | 1.246 |
| 2 | Fiji | 6 | 3 | 3 | 0 | 6 | −0.240 |
| 3 | Cook Islands | 6 | 3 | 3 | 0 | 6 | −0.939 |
| 4 | Samoa | 6 | 1 | 5 | 0 | 2 | −0.114 |

Source: ESPNcricinfo

T20I series
| No. | Date | Team 1 | Captain 1 | Team 2 | Captain 2 | Venue | Result |
|---|---|---|---|---|---|---|---|
| T20I 1762 | 9 September | Vanuatu | Patrick Matautaava | Fiji | Jone Wesele | Vanuatu Cricket Ground, Port Vila | Vanuatu by 56 runs |
| T20I 1763 | 9 September | Cook Islands | Ma'ara Ave | Samoa | James Baker | Vanuatu Cricket Ground, Port Vila | Samoa by 7 wickets |
| T20I 1765 | 10 September | Cook Islands | Ma'ara Ave | Fiji | Jone Wesele | Vanuatu Cricket Ground, Port Vila | Fiji by 3 wickets |
| T20I 1766 | 10 September | Vanuatu | Patrick Matautaava | Samoa | James Baker | Vanuatu Cricket Ground, Port Vila | Vanuatu by 9 wickets |
| T20I 1767 | 11 September | Vanuatu | Patrick Matautaava | Cook Islands | Ma'ara Ave | Vanuatu Cricket Ground, Port Vila | Cook Islands by 5 wickets |
| T20I 1768 | 11 September | Fiji | Jone Wesele | Samoa | James Baker | Vanuatu Cricket Ground, Port Vila | Fiji by 3 wickets |
| T20I 1770 | 13 September | Cook Islands | Ma'ara Ave | Samoa | James Baker | Vanuatu Cricket Ground, Port Vila | Cook Islands by 4 wickets |
| T20I 1771 | 13 September | Vanuatu | Patrick Matautaava | Fiji | Jone Wesele | Vanuatu Cricket Ground, Port Vila | Vanuatu by 18 runs |
| T20I 1772 | 14 September | Vanuatu | Patrick Matautaava | Samoa | James Baker | Vanuatu Cricket Ground, Port Vila | Vanuatu by 6 wickets |
| T20I 1773 | 14 September | Cook Islands | Ma'ara Ave | Fiji | Jone Wesele | Vanuatu Cricket Ground, Port Vila | Cook Islands by 8 wickets |
| T20I 1774 | 15 September | Fiji | Noa Acawei | Samoa | James Baker | Vanuatu Cricket Ground, Port Vila | Fiji by 30 runs |
| T20I 1775 | 15 September | Vanuatu | Patrick Matautaava | Cook Islands | Ma'ara Ave | Vanuatu Cricket Ground, Port Vila | Vanuatu by 50 runs (DLS) |

=== 2022 United Arab Emirates Women's Quadrangular Series ===
| Pos | Team | Pld | W | L | NR | Pts | NRR |
|---|---|---|---|---|---|---|---|
| 1 | Zimbabwe | 3 | 3 | 0 | 0 | 6 | 1.442 |
| 2 | Thailand | 3 | 2 | 1 | 0 | 4 | 1.016 |
| 3 | United States | 3 | 1 | 2 | 0 | 2 | −0.929 |
| 4 | United Arab Emirates | 3 | 0 | 3 | 0 | 0 | −1.515 |

Source: ESPNcricinfo

Round-robin
| No. | Date | Team 1 | Captain 1 | Team 2 | Captain 2 | Venue | Result |
|---|---|---|---|---|---|---|---|
| WT20I 1206 | 10 September | United States | Sindhu Sriharsha | Zimbabwe | Mary-Anne Musonda | ICC Academy Ground, Dubai | Zimbabwe by 5 wickets |
| WT20I 1208 | 10 September | United Arab Emirates | Chaya Mughal | Thailand | Naruemol Chaiwai | ICC Academy Ground, Dubai | Thailand by 7 wickets |
| WT20I 1212 | 12 September | United Arab Emirates | Chaya Mughal | Zimbabwe | Mary-Anne Musonda | ICC Academy Ground, Dubai | Zimbabwe by 47 runs |
| WT20I 1213 | 12 September | Thailand | Naruemol Chaiwai | United States | Sindhu Sriharsha | ICC Academy Ground, Dubai | Thailand by 10 wickets |
| WT20I 1214 | 13 September | Thailand | Naruemol Chaiwai | Zimbabwe | Josephine Nkomo | ICC Academy Ground, Dubai | Zimbabwe by 3 wickets |
| WT20I 1215 | 13 September | United Arab Emirates | Chaya Mughal | United States | Sindhu Sriharsha | ICC Academy Ground, Dubai | United States by 25 runs |

=== 2022 ACA Africa T20 Cup ===
| Pos | Team | Pld | W | L | NR | Pts | NRR |
|---|---|---|---|---|---|---|---|
| 1 | Uganda | 3 | 3 | 0 | 0 | 6 | 1.214 |
| 2 | Botswana | 3 | 2 | 1 | 0 | 4 | 1.490 |
| 3 | Ghana | 3 | 1 | 2 | 0 | 2 | −0.024 |
| 4 | Mozambique | 3 | 0 | 3 | 0 | 0 | −2.633 |

Source: ESPNcricinfo

| Pos | Team | Pld | W | L | NR | Pts | NRR |
|---|---|---|---|---|---|---|---|
| 1 | Tanzania | 3 | 3 | 0 | 0 | 6 | 2.724 |
| 2 | Kenya | 3 | 2 | 1 | 0 | 4 | 3.090 |
| 3 | Malawi | 3 | 1 | 2 | 0 | 2 | −0.915 |
| 4 | Cameroon | 3 | 0 | 3 | 0 | 0 | −5.075 |

Source: ESPNcricinfo

Group stage
| No. | Date | Team 1 | Captain 1 | Team 2 | Captain 2 | Venue | Result |
|---|---|---|---|---|---|---|---|
| T20I 1776 | 15 September | Botswana | Karabo Motlhanka | Uganda | Brian Masaba | Willowmoore Park, Benoni | Uganda by 7 wickets |
| T20I 1777 | 15 September | Cameroon | Faustin Mpegna | Malawi | Moazzam Baig | Willowmoore Park, Benoni | Malawi by 7 wickets |
| T20I 1778 | 16 September | Ghana | Obed Harvey | Mozambique | Filipe Cossa | Willowmoore Park, Benoni | Ghana by 28 runs |
| T20I 1779 | 16 September | Kenya | Shem Ngoche | Malawi | Moazzam Baig | Willowmoore Park, Benoni | Kenya by 52 runs |
| T20I 1780 | 17 September | Cameroon | Faustin Mpegna | Tanzania | Abhik Patwa | Willowmoore Park, Benoni | Tanzania by 10 wickets |
| T20I 1781 | 17 September | Kenya | Shem Ngoche | Tanzania | Abhik Patwa | Willowmoore Park, Benoni | Tanzania by 4 wickets |
| T20I 1782 | 18 September | Botswana | Karabo Motlhanka | Ghana | Obed Harvey | Willowmoore Park, Benoni | Botswana by 11 runs |
| T20I 1783 | 18 September | Mozambique | Filipe Cossa | Uganda | Brian Masaba | Willowmoore Park, Benoni | Uganda by 38 runs |
| T20I 1784 | 19 September | Cameroon | Faustin Mpegna | Kenya | Shem Ngoche | Willowmoore Park, Benoni | Kenya by 9 wickets |
| T20I 1785 | 19 September | Botswana | Karabo Motlhanka | Mozambique | Filipe Cossa | Willowmoore Park, Benoni | Botswana by 92 runs |
| T20I 1786 | 20 September | Malawi | Moazzam Baig | Tanzania | Abhik Patwa | Willowmoore Park, Benoni | Tanzania by 44 runs |
| T20I 1787 | 20 September | Ghana | Obed Harvey | Uganda | Brian Masaba | Willowmoore Park, Benoni | Uganda by 8 wickets |
Play-offs
| No. | Date | Team 1 | Captain 1 | Team 2 | Captain 2 | Venue | Result |
| T20I 1790 | 21 September | Kenya | Shem Ngoche | Uganda | Brian Masaba | Willowmoore Park, Benoni | Uganda by 3 wickets (DLS) |
| T20I 1791 | 21 September | Botswana | Karabo Motlhanka | Tanzania | Abhik Patwa | Willowmoore Park, Benoni | Tanzania by 4 wickets |
| T20I 1792 | 22 September | Tanzania | Abhik Patwa | Uganda | Brian Masaba | Willowmoore Park, Benoni | Uganda by 8 wickets |

=== 2022 ICC Women's T20 World Cup Qualifier ===
| Pos | Team | Pld | W | L | NR | Pts | NRR |
|---|---|---|---|---|---|---|---|
| 1 | Bangladesh | 3 | 3 | 0 | 0 | 6 | 2.001 |
| 2 | Ireland | 3 | 2 | 1 | 0 | 4 | 0.925 |
| 3 | Scotland | 3 | 1 | 2 | 0 | 2 | 0.338 |
| 4 | United States | 3 | 0 | 3 | 0 | 0 | −3.064 |

Source: ESPNcricinfo

| Pos | Team | Pld | W | L | NR | Pts | NRR |
|---|---|---|---|---|---|---|---|
| 1 | Zimbabwe | 3 | 2 | 1 | 0 | 4 | 0.894 |
| 2 | Thailand | 3 | 2 | 1 | 0 | 4 | 0.293 |
| 3 | Papua New Guinea | 3 | 1 | 2 | 0 | 2 | −0.270 |
| 4 | United Arab Emirates | 3 | 1 | 2 | 0 | 2 | −0.928 |

Source: ESPN Cricinfo

Group stage
| No. | Date | Team 1 | Captain 1 | Team 2 | Captain 2 | Venue | Result |
|---|---|---|---|---|---|---|---|
| WT20I 1218 | 18 September | United Arab Emirates | Chaya Mughal | Thailand | Naruemol Chaiwai | Sheikh Zayed Cricket Stadium, Abu Dhabi | Thailand by 7 wickets |
| WT20I 1219 | 18 September | Papua New Guinea | Kaia Arua | Zimbabwe | Mary-Anne Musonda | Tolerance Oval, Abu Dhabi | Zimbabwe by 8 wickets |
| WT20I 1220 | 18 September | Bangladesh | Nigar Sultana | Ireland | Laura Delany | Sheikh Zayed Cricket Stadium, Abu Dhabi | Bangladesh by 14 runs |
| WT20I 1221 | 18 September | Scotland | Kathryn Bryce | United States | Sindhu Sriharsha | Tolerance Oval, Abu Dhabi | Scotland by 79 runs |
| WT20I 1222 | 19 September | Thailand | Naruemol Chaiwai | Zimbabwe | Mary-Anne Musonda | Sheikh Zayed Cricket Stadium, Abu Dhabi | Zimbabwe by 6 wickets |
| WT20I 1223 | 19 September | United Arab Emirates | Chaya Mughal | Papua New Guinea | Kaia Arua | Tolerance Oval, Abu Dhabi | Papua New Guinea by 29 runs |
| WT20I 1224 | 19 September | Bangladesh | Nigar Sultana | Scotland | Kathryn Bryce | Sheikh Zayed Cricket Stadium, Abu Dhabi | Bangladesh by 6 wickets |
| WT20I 1225 | 19 September | Ireland | Laura Delany | United States | Sindhu Sriharsha | Tolerance Oval, Abu Dhabi | Ireland by 9 wickets |
| WT20I 1226 | 21 September | Bangladesh | Nigar Sultana | United States | Sindhu Sriharsha | Sheikh Zayed Cricket Stadium, Abu Dhabi | Bangladesh by 55 runs |
| WT20I 1227 | 21 September | Ireland | Laura Delany | Scotland | Kathryn Bryce | Tolerance Oval, Abu Dhabi | Ireland by 19 runs |
| WT20I 1228 | 21 September | Papua New Guinea | Kaia Arua | Thailand | Naruemol Chaiwai | Sheikh Zayed Cricket Stadium, Abu Dhabi | Thailand by 12 runs |
| WT20I 1229 | 21 September | United Arab Emirates | Chaya Mughal | Zimbabwe | Mary-Anne Musonda | Tolerance Oval, Abu Dhabi | United Arab Emirates by 4 wickets |
Play-offs
| No. | Date | Team 1 | Captain 1 | Team 2 | Captain 2 | Venue | Result |
| WT20I 1230 | 23 September | Ireland | Laura Delany | Zimbabwe | Mary-Anne Musonda | Sheikh Zayed Cricket Stadium, Abu Dhabi | Ireland by 4 runs |
| WT20I 1231 | 23 September | Scotland | Kathryn Bryce | United Arab Emirates | Chaya Mughal | Tolerance Oval, Abu Dhabi | Scotland by 85 runs |
| WT20I 1232 | 23 September | Bangladesh | Nigar Sultana | Thailand | Naruemol Chaiwai | Sheikh Zayed Cricket Stadium, Abu Dhabi | Bangladesh by 11 runs |
| WT20I 1233 | 23 September | Papua New Guinea | Kaia Arua | United States | Sindhu Sriharsha | Tolerance Oval, Abu Dhabi | Papua New Guinea by 7 wickets |
| WT20I 1234 | 25 September | Thailand | Naruemol Chaiwai | Zimbabwe | Mary-Anne Musonda | Sheikh Zayed Cricket Stadium, Abu Dhabi | Zimbabwe by 7 runs |
| WT20I 1235 | 25 September | United Arab Emirates | Chaya Mughal | United States | Sindhu Sriharsha | Tolerance Oval, Abu Dhabi | United Arab Emirates by 5 wickets |
| WT20I 1236 | 25 September | Bangladesh | Nigar Sultana | Ireland | Laura Delany | Sheikh Zayed Cricket Stadium, Abu Dhabi | Bangladesh by 7 runs |
| WT20I 1237 | 25 September | Papua New Guinea | Kaia Arua | Scotland | Kathryn Bryce | Tolerance Oval, Abu Dhabi | Papua New Guinea by 8 wickets |

== October ==
=== 2022 Women's Pacific Cup ===
| Pos | Team | Pld | W | L | NR | Pts | NRR |
|---|---|---|---|---|---|---|---|
| 1 | Papua New Guinea | 6 | 5 | 0 | 1 | 11 | 6.229 |
| 2 | Vanuatu | 6 | 3 | 2 | 1 | 7 | 0.893 |
| 3 | Samoa | 6 | 2 | 3 | 1 | 5 | −0.601 |
| 4 | Fiji | 6 | 0 | 5 | 1 | 1 | −5.190 |

Source: ESPNcricinfo

WT20I series
| No. | Date | Team 1 | Captain 1 | Team 2 | Captain 2 | Venue | Result |
|---|---|---|---|---|---|---|---|
| WT20I 1245 | 3 October | Vanuatu | Selina Solman | Samoa | Kolotita Nonu | Vanuatu Cricket Ground, Port Vila | Vanuatu by 21 runs |
| WT20I 1246 | 3 October | Fiji | Ruci Muriyalo | Papua New Guinea | Kaia Arua | Vanuatu Cricket Ground (Oval 2), Port Vila | Papua New Guinea by 178 runs |
| WT20I 1247 | 3 October | Vanuatu | Selina Solman | Fiji | Ruci Muriyalo | Vanuatu Cricket Ground, Port Vila | Vanuatu by 78 runs |
| WT20I 1248 | 3 October | Papua New Guinea | Kaia Arua | Samoa | Kolotita Nonu | Vanuatu Cricket Ground (Oval 2), Port Vila | Papua New Guinea by 8 wickets |
| WT20I 1253 | 5 October | Fiji | Ruci Muriyalo | Samoa | Kolotita Nonu | Vanuatu Cricket Ground, Port Vila | Samoa by 75 runs |
| WT20I 1254 | 5 October | Vanuatu | Selina Solman | Papua New Guinea | Kaia Arua | Vanuatu Cricket Ground (Oval 2), Port Vila | Papua New Guinea by 8 wickets |
| WT20I 1255 | 5 October | Fiji | Ruci Muriyalo | Papua New Guinea | Kaia Arua | Vanuatu Cricket Ground, Port Vila | Papua New Guinea by 124 runs |
| WT20I 1256 | 5 October | Vanuatu | Selina Solman | Samoa | Kolotita Nonu | Vanuatu Cricket Ground (Oval 2), Port Vila | Samoa by 6 wickets |
| WT20I 1259 | 6 October | Papua New Guinea | Kaia Arua | Samoa | Kolotita Nonu | Vanuatu Cricket Ground, Port Vila | Papua New Guinea by 10 wickets |
| WT20I 1260 | 6 October | Vanuatu | Selina Solman | Fiji | Ruci Muriyalo | Vanuatu Cricket Ground (Oval 2), Port Vila | Vanuatu by 64 runs |
| WT20I 1261 | 6 October | Vanuatu | Selina Solman | Papua New Guinea | Kaia Arua | Vanuatu Cricket Ground, Port Vila | No result |
| WT20I 1262 | 6 October | Fiji | Ruci Muriyalo | Samoa | Kolotita Nonu | Vanuatu Cricket Ground (Oval 2), Port Vila | No result |

=== Indonesia in Japan ===
T20I series
| No. | Date | Home captain | Away captain | Venue | Result |
|---|---|---|---|---|---|
| T20I 1810 | 9 October | Kendel Kadowaki-Fleming | Kadek Gamantika | Sano International Cricket Ground, Sano | Japan by 65 runs |
| T20I 1813 | 10 October | Kendel Kadowaki-Fleming | Kadek Gamantika | Sano International Cricket Ground, Sano | Japan by 75 runs |
| T20I 1814 | 11 October | Kendel Kadowaki-Fleming | Kadek Gamantika | Sano International Cricket Ground, Sano | Indonesia by 3 wickets |

=== 2022 Women's South American Cricket Championship ===
| Pos | Team | Pld | W | L | NR | Pts | NRR |
|---|---|---|---|---|---|---|---|
| 1 | Canada XI | 3 | 3 | 0 | 0 | 6 | 5.164 |
| 2 | Brazil | 3 | 2 | 1 | 0 | 4 | 2.971 |
| 3 | Argentina | 3 | 1 | 2 | 0 | 2 | −0.357 |
| 4 | Peru | 3 | 0 | 3 | 0 | 0 | −10.406 |

Source: ESPN Cricinfo

Round-robin
| No. | Date | Team 1 | Captain 1 | Team 2 | Captain 2 | Venue | Result |
|---|---|---|---|---|---|---|---|
| 1st Match | 13 October | Argentina | Alison Stocks | Canada XI | Divya Saxena | Sao Fernando Polo and Cricket Club, Itaguaí | Canada XI by 112 runs |
| WT20I 1277 | 13 October | Brazil | Roberta Moretti Avery | Peru | Milka Linares Flores | Sao Fernando Polo and Cricket Club, Itaguaí | Brazil by 202 runs |
| 3rd Match | 14 October | Brazil | Roberta Moretti Avery | Canada XI | Divya Saxena | Sao Fernando Polo and Cricket Club, Itaguaí | Canada XI by 45 runs |
| WT20I 1278 | 14 October | Argentina | Alison Stocks | Peru | Milka Linares | Sao Fernando Polo and Cricket Club, Itaguaí | Argentina by 10 wickets |
| WT20I 1280 | 15 October | Brazil | Roberta Moretti Avery | Argentina | Alison Stocks | Sao Fernando Polo and Cricket Club, Itaguaí | Brazil by 8 wickets |
| 6th Match | 15 October | Canada XI | Divya Saxena | Peru | Milka Linares | Sao Fernando Polo and Cricket Club, Itaguaí | Canada XI by 10 wickets |
Play-offs
| No. | Date | Team 1 | Captain 1 | Team 2 | Captain 2 | Venue | Result |
| WT20I 1281 | 16 October | Argentina | Alison Stocks | Peru | Milka Linares | Sao Fernando Polo and Cricket Club (Campo Sede), Itaguaí | Argentina by 184 runs |
| Final | 16 October | Brazil | Roberta Moretti Avery | Canada XI | Divya Saxena | Sao Fernando Polo and Cricket Club, Itaguaí | Canada XI by 36 runs |

=== 2022–23 ICC T20 World Cup EAP Qualifier B ===
| Pos | Team | Pld | W | L | T | NR | Pts | NRR |
|---|---|---|---|---|---|---|---|---|
| 1 | Japan | 4 | 3 | 1 | 0 | 0 | 6 | 2.928 |
| 2 | Indonesia | 4 | 3 | 1 | 0 | 0 | 6 | 1.066 |
| 3 | South Korea | 4 | 0 | 4 | 0 | 0 | 0 | −3.965 |

Source: ESPNcricinfo

T20I series
| No. | Date | Team 1 | Captain 1 | Team 2 | Captain 2 | Venue | Result |
|---|---|---|---|---|---|---|---|
| T20I 1821 | 15 October | Indonesia | Kadek Gamantika | South Korea | Jun Hyunwoo | Sano International Cricket Ground, Sano | Indonesia by 64 runs |
| T20I 1822 | 15 October | Japan | Kendel Kadowaki-Fleming | South Korea | Jun Hyunwoo | Sano International Cricket Ground, Sano | Japan by 48 runs |
| T20I 1824 | 16 October | Japan | Kendel Kadowaki-Fleming | Indonesia | Kadek Gamantika | Sano International Cricket Ground, Sano | Japan by 4 wickets |
| T20I 1827 | 17 October | Japan | Kendel Kadowaki-Fleming | South Korea | Jun Hyunwoo | Sano International Cricket Ground, Sano | Japan by 8 wickets |
| T20I 1829 | 18 October | Japan | Kendel Kadowaki-Fleming | Indonesia | Kadek Gamantika | Sano International Cricket Ground, Sano | Indonesia by 6 wickets |
| T20I 1831 | 18 October | Indonesia | Kadek Gamantika | South Korea | Jun Hyunwoo | Sano International Cricket Ground, Sano | Indonesia by 3 wickets |

=== 2022 Men's South American Cricket Championship ===
| Pos | Team | Pld | W | L | NR | Pts | NRR |
|---|---|---|---|---|---|---|---|
| 1 | Brazil | 6 | 5 | 1 | 0 | 15 | 2.106 |
| 2 | Argentina | 6 | 4 | 2 | 0 | 12 | 1.250 |
| 3 | Chile | 6 | 4 | 2 | 0 | 12 | 1.146 |
| 4 | Mexico | 6 | 4 | 2 | 0 | 12 | 0.303 |
| 5 | Uruguay | 6 | 2 | 4 | 0 | 6 | −2.421 |
| 6 | Colombia | 6 | 1 | 5 | 0 | 3 | −0.893 |
| 7 | Peru | 6 | 1 | 5 | 0 | 3 | −1.296 |

Source: CricClubs

Round-robin
| No. | Date | Team 1 | Captain 1 | Team 2 | Captain 2 | Venue | Result |
|---|---|---|---|---|---|---|---|
| 1st Match | 20 October | Colombia | Julian Buttigieg | Mexico | Tarun Sharma | Sao Fernando Polo and Cricket Club, Itaguaí | Mexico by 4 wickets |
| 2nd Match | 20 October | Chile | Alex Carthew | Peru | Hafez Farooq | Sao Fernando Polo and Cricket Club (Campo Sede), Itaguaí | Chile by 10 wickets |
| 3rd Match | 20 October | Brazil | Greigor Caisley | Uruguay | Rahul Sasidharan | Sao Fernando Polo and Cricket Club (Ground 3), Itaguaí | Brazil by 6 wickets |
| 4th Match | 20 October | Brazil | Greigor Caisley | Argentina | Hernán Fennell | Sao Fernando Polo and Cricket Club, Itaguaí | Brazil by 7 wickets |
| 5th Match | 20 October | Chile | Alex Carthew | Uruguay | Rahul Sasidharan | Sao Fernando Polo and Cricket Club (Campo Sede), Itaguaí | Uruguay by 5 runs |
| 6th Match | 20 October | Colombia | Julian Buttigieg | Peru | Hafez Farooq | Sao Fernando Polo and Cricket Club (Ground 3), Itaguaí | Colombia by 5 wickets |
| 7th Match | 21 October | Brazil | Greigor Caisley | Peru | Hafez Farooq | Sao Fernando Polo and Cricket Club, Itaguaí | Brazil by 8 wickets |
| 8th Match | 21 October | Argentina | Hernán Fennell | Uruguay | Rahul Sasidharan | Sao Fernando Polo and Cricket Club (Campo Sede), Itaguaí | Argentina by 133 runs |
| 9th Match | 21 October | Chile | Alex Carthew | Mexico | Tarun Sharma | Sao Fernando Polo and Cricket Club (Ground 3), Itaguaí | Chile by 9 wickets |
| 10th Match | 21 October | Argentina | Hernán Fennell | Chile | Alex Carthew | Sao Fernando Polo and Cricket Club, Itaguaí | Argentina by 8 runs |
| 11th Match | 21 October | Brazil | ? | Mexico | Tarun Sharma | Sao Fernando Polo and Cricket Club (Campo Sede), Itaguaí | Brazil by 35 runs |
| 12th Match | 21 October | Colombia | Julian Buttigieg | Uruguay | Rahul Sasidharan | Sao Fernando Polo and Cricket Club (Ground 3), Itaguaí | Uruguay by 6 wickets |
| 13th Match | 22 October | Brazil | ? | Colombia | Julian Buttigieg | Sao Fernando Polo and Cricket Club, Itaguaí | Brazil by 6 wickets |
| 14th Match | 22 October | Peru | Hafez Farooq | Uruguay | Rahul Sasidharan | Sao Fernando Polo and Cricket Club (Campo Sede), Itaguaí | Peru by 70 runs |
| 15th Match | 22 October | Argentina | Hernán Fennell | Mexico | Tarun Sharma | Sao Fernando Polo and Cricket Club (Ground 3), Itaguaí | Mexico by 4 wickets |
| 16th Match | 22 October | Mexico | Tarun Sharma | Peru | Hafez Farooq | Sao Fernando Polo and Cricket Club, Itaguaí | Mexico by 5 wickets |
| 17th Match | 22 October | Argentina | Hernán Fennell | Colombia | Julian Buttigieg | Sao Fernando Polo and Cricket Club (Campo Sede), Itaguaí | Argentina by 6 wickets |
| 18th Match | 22 October | Brazil | ? | Chile | Alex Carthew | Sao Fernando Polo and Cricket Club (Ground 3), Itaguaí | Chile by 7 wickets |
| 19th Match | 23 October | Chile | Alex Carthew | Colombia | Julian Buttigieg | Sao Fernando Polo and Cricket Club, Itaguaí | Chile by 44 runs |
| 20th Match | 23 October | Mexico | ? | Uruguay | Rahul Sasidharan | Sao Fernando Polo and Cricket Club (Campo Sede), Itaguaí | Mexico by 5 wickets |
| 21st Match | 23 October | Argentina | Hernán Fennell | Peru | Hafez Farooq | Sao Fernando Polo and Cricket Club (Ground 3), Itaguaí | Argentina by 82 runs |
Final
| No. | Date | Team 1 | Captain 1 | Team 2 | Captain 2 | Venue | Result |
| Final | 23 October | Brazil | ? | Argentina | Hernán Fennell | Sao Fernando Polo and Cricket Club (Ground 3), Itaguaí | Argentina by 10 runs |

=== Hong Kong women in Japan ===
East Asia Cup – WT20I series
| No. | Date | Home captain | Away captain | Venue | Result |
|---|---|---|---|---|---|
| WT20I 1282 | 27 October | Mai Yanagida | Kary Chan | Kaizuka Cricket Ground, Kaizuka | Hong Kong by 8 wickets |
| WT20I 1283 | 28 October | Mai Yanagida | Yasmin Daswani | Kaizuka Cricket Ground, Kaizuka | Hong Kong by 8 wickets |
| WT20I 1284 | 29 October | Mai Yanagida | Yasmin Daswani | Kaizuka Cricket Ground, Kaizuka | Hong Kong by 3 runs |
| WT20I 1285 | 30 October | Mai Yanagida | Yasmin Daswani | Kaizuka Cricket Ground, Kaizuka | Match tied (Hong Kong won S/O) |

=== Rwanda in Tanzania ===
T20I series
| No. | Date | Home captain | Away captain | Venue | Result |
|---|---|---|---|---|---|
| T20I 1854 | 31 October | Abhik Patwa | Clinton Rubagumya | Annadil Burhani Ground, Dar es Salaam | Tanzania by 54 runs |
| T20I 1857 | 1 November | Kassim Nassoro | Clinton Rubagumya | Annadil Burhani Ground, Dar es Salaam | Tanzania by 21 runs |
| T20I 1863 | 4 November | Abhik Patwa | Clinton Rubagumya | Annadil Burhani Ground, Dar es Salaam | Tanzania by 77 runs |
| T20I 1869 | 5 November | Abhik Patwa | Clinton Rubagumya | Annadil Burhani Ground, Dar es Salaam | Tanzania by 3 wickets |
| T20I 1875 | 6 November | Abhik Patwa | Kevin Irakoze | Annadil Burhani Ground, Dar es Salaam | Tanzania by 10 wickets |

== November ==
=== Singapore women in Indonesia ===
WT20I series
| No. | Date | Home captain | Away captain | Venue | Result |
|---|---|---|---|---|---|
| WT20I 1286 | 4 November | Ni Wayan Sariani | Shafina Mahesh | Udayana Cricket Ground, Jimbaran | Indonesia by 96 runs |
| WT20I 1287 | 5 November | Ni Wayan Sariani | Shafina Mahesh | Udayana Cricket Ground, Jimbaran | Indonesia by 121 runs |
| WT20I 1288 | 6 November | Ni Wayan Sariani | Shafina Mahesh | Udayana Cricket Ground, Jimbaran | Indonesia by 62 runs |
| WT20I 1289 | 7 November | Ni Wayan Sariani | Shafina Mahesh | Udayana Cricket Ground, Jimbaran | Indonesia by 87 runs |
| WT20I 1290 | 8 November | Ni Wayan Sariani | Shafina Mahesh | Udayana Cricket Ground, Jimbaran | Indonesia by 43 runs (DLS) |
| WT20I 1291 | 9 November | Ni Wayan Sariani | Shafina Mahesh | Udayana Cricket Ground, Jimbaran | Indonesia by 9 wickets |

=== 2022–23 Spain Tri-Nation Series ===
| Pos | Team | Pld | W | L | NR | Pts | NRR |
|---|---|---|---|---|---|---|---|
| 1 | Germany | 4 | 3 | 1 | 0 | 6 | 1.251 |
| 2 | Spain | 4 | 2 | 2 | 0 | 4 | −0.668 |
| 3 | Italy | 4 | 1 | 3 | 0 | 2 | −0.663 |

Source: ESPNcricinfo

T20I series
| No. | Date | Team 1 | Captain 1 | Team 2 | Captain 2 | Venue | Result |
|---|---|---|---|---|---|---|---|
| T20I 1865 | 4 November | Italy | Gian-Piero Meade | Germany | Michael Richardson | Desert Springs Cricket Ground, Almería | Germany by 10 wickets |
| T20I 1866 | 4 November | Italy | Gian-Piero Meade | Germany | Michael Richardson | Desert Springs Cricket Ground, Almería | Germany by 8 wickets |
| T20I 1868 | 5 November | Spain | Christian Munoz-Mills | Italy | Gian-Piero Meade | Desert Springs Cricket Ground, Almería | Spain by 4 wickets |
| T20I 1870 | 5 November | Spain | Christian Munoz-Mills | Germany | Michael Richardson | Desert Springs Cricket Ground, Almería | Germany by 36 runs |
| T20I 1874 | 6 November | Spain | Christian Munoz-Mills | Germany | Michael Richardson | Desert Springs Cricket Ground, Almería | Spain by 5 runs |
| T20I 1876 | 6 November | Spain | Christian Munoz-Mills | Italy | Marcus Campopiano | Desert Springs Cricket Ground, Almería | Italy by 33 runs |

=== 2022 Spain Women's Pentangular Series ===
| Pos | Team | Pld | W | L | NR | Pts | NRR |
|---|---|---|---|---|---|---|---|
| 1 | Italy | 4 | 4 | 0 | 0 | 8 | 4.004 |
| 2 | Spain | 4 | 3 | 1 | 0 | 6 | −0.052 |
| 3 | Sweden | 4 | 2 | 2 | 0 | 4 | 0.180 |
| 4 | Isle of Man | 4 | 1 | 3 | 0 | 2 | −0.676 |
| 5 | Norway | 4 | 0 | 4 | 0 | 0 | −3.848 |

Source: ESPNcricinfo

WT20I series
| No. | Date | Team 1 | Captain 1 | Team 2 | Captain 2 | Venue | Result |
|---|---|---|---|---|---|---|---|
| WT20I 1291a | 11 November | Spain | Elspeth Fowler | Italy | Kumudu Peddrick | Desert Springs Cricket Ground, Almería | Match abandoned |
| WT20I 1291b | 11 November | Isle of Man | Clare Crowe | Sweden | Gunjan Shukla | Desert Springs Cricket Ground, Almería | Match abandoned |
| WT20I 1292 | 11 November | Italy | Kumudu Peddrick | Norway | Farial Zia Safdar | Desert Springs Cricket Ground, Almería | Italy by 110 runs |
| WT20I 1294 | 12 November | Isle of Man | Clare Crowe | Norway | Farial Zia Safdar | Desert Springs Cricket Ground, Almería | Isle of Man by 10 wickets |
| WT20I 1295 | 12 November | Italy | Kumudu Peddrick | Sweden | Gunjan Shukla | Desert Springs Cricket Ground, Almería | Italy by 72 runs |
| WT20I 1296 | 12 November | Spain | Elspeth Fowler | Isle of Man | Clare Crowe | Desert Springs Cricket Ground, Almería | Spain by 14 runs (DLS) |
| WT20I 1297 | 13 November | Spain | Elspeth Fowler | Norway | Farial Zia Safdar | Desert Springs Cricket Ground, Almería | Spain by 35 runs |
| WT20I 1298 | 13 November | Isle of Man | Clare Crowe | Italy | Kumudu Peddrick | Desert Springs Cricket Ground, Almería | Italy by 6 wickets |
| WT20I 1299 | 13 November | Norway | Farial Zia Safdar | Sweden | Gunjan Shukla | Desert Springs Cricket Ground, Almería | Sweden by 51 runs |
| WT20I 1301 | 14 November | Spain | Elspeth Fowler | Sweden | Gunjan Shukla | Desert Springs Cricket Ground, Almería | Spain by 43 runs |
| WT20I 1302 | 14 November | Spain | Elspeth Fowler | Italy | Kumudu Peddrick | Desert Springs Cricket Ground, Almería | Italy by 96 runs |
| WT20I 1303 | 14 November | Isle of Man | Clare Crowe | Sweden | Gunjan Shukla | Desert Springs Cricket Ground, Almería | Sweden by 8 wickets |

=== 2022 Desert Cup T20I Series ===
| Pos | Team | Pld | W | L | NR | Pts | NRR |
|---|---|---|---|---|---|---|---|
| 1 | Canada | 6 | 5 | 1 | 0 | 10 | 0.948 |
| 2 | Oman | 6 | 3 | 3 | 0 | 6 | 2.135 |
| 3 | Bahrain | 6 | 3 | 3 | 0 | 6 | −1.044 |
| 4 | Saudi Arabia | 6 | 1 | 5 | 0 | 2 | −2.125 |

Source: ESPNcricinfo

T20I series
| No. | Date | Team 1 | Captain 1 | Team 2 | Captain 2 | Venue | Result |
|---|---|---|---|---|---|---|---|
| T20I 1880 | 14 November | Oman | Zeeshan Maqsood | Saudi Arabia | Abdul Waheed | Oman Cricket Academy Ground Turf 1, Muscat | Oman by 9 wickets |
| T20I 1881 | 14 November | Bahrain | Sarfaraz Ali | Canada | Saad Bin Zafar | Oman Cricket Academy Ground Turf 1, Muscat | Canada by 4 wickets |
| T20I 1882 | 15 November | Canada | Saad Bin Zafar | Saudi Arabia | Abdul Waheed | Oman Cricket Academy Ground Turf 1, Muscat | Canada by 66 runs |
| T20I 1883 | 15 November | Oman | Zeeshan Maqsood | Bahrain | Sarfaraz Ali | Oman Cricket Academy Ground Turf 1, Muscat | Bahrain by 6 wickets |
| T20I 1884 | 16 November | Bahrain | Sarfaraz Ali | Saudi Arabia | Abdul Waheed | Oman Cricket Academy Ground Turf 1, Muscat | Bahrain by 53 runs |
| T20I 1885 | 16 November | Oman | Zeeshan Maqsood | Canada | Saad Bin Zafar | Oman Cricket Academy Ground Turf 1, Muscat | Canada by 1 run |
| T20I 1890 | 17 November | Oman | Zeeshan Maqsood | Saudi Arabia | Abdul Waheed | Oman Cricket Academy Ground Turf 1, Muscat | Oman by 7 wickets |
| T20I 1891 | 17 November | Bahrain | Sarfaraz Ali | Canada | Saad Bin Zafar | Oman Cricket Academy Ground Turf 1, Muscat | Bahrain by 8 wickets |
| T20I 1896 | 19 November | Canada | Saad Bin Zafar | Saudi Arabia | Abdul Waheed | Oman Cricket Academy Ground Turf 1, Muscat | Canada by 45 runs |
| T20I 1897 | 19 November | Oman | Zeeshan Maqsood | Bahrain | Sarfaraz Ali | Oman Cricket Academy Ground Turf 1, Muscat | Oman by 106 runs |
| T20I 1903 | 20 November | Oman | Zeeshan Maqsood | Canada | Saad Bin Zafar | Oman Cricket Academy Ground Turf 1, Muscat | Canada by 3 wickets |
| T20I 1904 | 20 November | Bahrain | Sarfaraz Ali | Saudi Arabia | Abdul Waheed | Oman Cricket Academy Ground Turf 1, Muscat | Saudi Arabia by 9 wickets |
Play-offs
| No. | Date | Team 1 | Captain 1 | Team 2 | Captain 2 | Venue | Result |
| T20I 1909 | 21 November | Bahrain | Sarfaraz Ali | Saudi Arabia | Abdul Waheed | Oman Cricket Academy Ground Turf 1, Muscat | Saudi Arabia by 32 runs |
| T20I 1910 | 21 November | Oman | Zeeshan Maqsood | Canada | Saad Bin Zafar | Oman Cricket Academy Ground Turf 1, Muscat | Canada by 8 wickets |

=== 2022–23 ICC T20 World Cup Africa Qualifier A ===
| Pos | Team | Pld | W | L | NR | Pts | NRR |
|---|---|---|---|---|---|---|---|
| 1 | Kenya | 7 | 5 | 0 | 2 | 12 | 5.699 |
| 2 | Rwanda | 7 | 5 | 1 | 1 | 11 | 2.466 |
| 3 | Malawi | 7 | 4 | 1 | 2 | 10 | 2.026 |
| 4 | Botswana | 7 | 3 | 3 | 1 | 7 | 1.167 |
| 5 | Saint Helena | 7 | 2 | 3 | 2 | 6 | −0.976 |
| 6 | Lesotho | 7 | 2 | 4 | 1 | 5 | −3.497 |
| 7 | Seychelles | 7 | 0 | 4 | 3 | 3 | −1.639 |
| 8 | Mali | 7 | 0 | 5 | 2 | 2 | −4.954 |

Source: ESPNcricinfo

T20I series
| No. | Date | Team 1 | Captain 1 | Team 2 | Captain 2 | Venue | Result |
|---|---|---|---|---|---|---|---|
| T20I 1886 | 17 November | Lesotho | Chachole Tlali | Mali | Cheick Keita | IPRC Cricket Ground, Kigali | Lesotho by 31 runs |
| T20I 1887 | 17 November | Rwanda | Clinton Rubagumya | Botswana | Karabo Motlhanka | Gahanga International Cricket Stadium, Kigali | Rwanda by 5 wickets |
| T20I 1888 | 17 November | Botswana | Karabo Motlhanka | Seychelles | Naidoo Krishna | IPRC Cricket Ground, Kigali | No result |
| T20I 1889 | 17 November | Kenya | Sachin Bhudia | Saint Helena | Scott Crowie | Gahanga International Cricket Stadium, Kigali | No result |
| T20I 1892 | 18 November | Botswana | Karabo Motlhanka | Lesotho | Chachole Tlali | IPRC Cricket Ground, Kigali | Botswana by 10 wickets |
| T20I 1893 | 18 November | Rwanda | Clinton Rubagumya | Saint Helena | Scott Crowie | Gahanga International Cricket Stadium, Kigali | Rwanda by 54 runs |
| T20I 1894 | 18 November | Kenya | Sachin Bhudia | Malawi | Moazzam Baig | Gahanga International Cricket Stadium, Kigali | No result |
| T20I 1895 | 18 November | Mali | Cheick Keita | Seychelles | Naidoo Krishna | IPRC Cricket Ground, Kigali | No result |
| T20I 1899 | 20 November | Botswana | Karabo Motlhanka | Malawi | Moazzam Baig | Gahanga International Cricket Stadium, Kigali | Malawi by 4 wickets |
| T20I 1900 | 20 November | Kenya | Sachin Bhudia | Mali | Cheick Keita | IPRC Cricket Ground, Kigali | Kenya by 10 wickets |
| T20I 1901 | 20 November | Lesotho | Chachole Tlali | Seychelles | Naidoo Krishna | IPRC Cricket Ground, Kigali | Lesotho by 7 wickets |
| T20I 1902 | 20 November | Rwanda | Clinton Rubagumya | Kenya | Sachin Bhudia | Gahanga International Cricket Stadium, Kigali | Kenya by 9 wickets |
| T20I 1905 | 21 November | Kenya | Sachin Bhudia | Lesotho | Chachole Tlali | IPRC Cricket Ground, Kigali | Kenya by 167 runs |
| T20I 1906 | 21 November | Malawi | Moazzam Baig | Mali | Cheick Keita | Gahanga International Cricket Stadium, Kigali | Malawi by 74 runs |
| T20I 1907 | 21 November | Rwanda | Clinton Rubagumya | Malawi | Moazzam Baig | Gahanga International Cricket Stadium, Kigali | Rwanda by 41 runs (DLS) |
| T20I 1908 | 21 November | Saint Helena | Scott Crowie | Seychelles | Naidoo Krishna | IPRC Cricket Ground, Kigali | Saint Helena by 2 runs |
| T20I 1912 | 22 November | Botswana | Karabo Motlhanka | Mali | Cheick Keita | Gahanga International Cricket Stadium, Kigali | Botswana by 5 wickets |
| T20I 1913 | 22 November | Lesotho | Chachole Tlali | Saint Helena | Scott Crowie | IPRC Cricket Ground, Kigali | Saint Helena by 45 runs |
| T20I 1914 | 22 November | Malawi | Moazzam Baig | Seychelles | Naidoo Krishna | Gahanga International Cricket Stadium, Kigali | No result |
| T20I 1915 | 22 November | Mali | Cheick Keita | Saint Helena | Scott Crowie | IPRC Cricket Ground, Kigali | No result |
| T20I 1916 | 24 November | Malawi | Moazzam Baig | Saint Helena | Scott Crowie | Gahanga International Cricket Stadium, Kigali | Malawi by 10 wickets |
| T20I 1917 | 24 November | Rwanda | Clinton Rubagumya | Seychelles | Naidoo Krishna | IPRC Cricket Ground, Kigali | Rwanda by 75 runs |
| T20I 1918 | 24 November | Botswana | Karabo Motlhanka | Kenya | Sachin Bhudia | Gahanga International Cricket Stadium, Kigali | Kenya by 8 wickets |
| T20I 1919 | 24 November | Rwanda | Clinton Rubagumya | Mali | Cheick Keita | IPRC Cricket Ground, Kigali | Rwanda by 10 wickets |
| T20I 1920 | 25 November | Botswana | Karabo Motlhanka | Saint Helena | Scott Crowie | Gahanga International Cricket Stadium, Kigali | Botswana by 59 runs |
| T20I 1921 | 25 November | Lesotho | Chachole Tlali | Malawi | Moazzam Baig | IPRC Cricket Ground, Kigali | Malawi by 118 runs |
| T20I 1922 | 25 November | Kenya | Lucas Oluoch | Seychelles | Naidoo Krishna | Gahanga International Cricket Stadium, Kigali | Kenya by 7 wickets (DLS) |
| T20I 1923 | 25 November | Rwanda | Clinton Rubagumya | Lesotho | Chachole Tlali | IPRC Cricket Ground, Kigali | No result |

== December ==
=== 2022–23 ICC T20 World Cup Africa Qualifier B ===
| Pos | Team | Pld | W | L | NR | Pts | NRR |
|---|---|---|---|---|---|---|---|
| 1 | Tanzania | 7 | 6 | 0 | 1 | 13 | 4.891 |
| 2 | Nigeria | 7 | 6 | 0 | 1 | 13 | 3.739 |
| 3 | Mozambique | 7 | 5 | 2 | 0 | 10 | 0.684 |
| 4 | Sierra Leone | 7 | 4 | 3 | 0 | 8 | −0.039 |
| 5 | Ghana | 7 | 3 | 4 | 0 | 6 | 1.446 |
| 6 | Eswatini | 7 | 1 | 5 | 1 | 3 | −2.067 |
| 7 | Gambia | 7 | 1 | 6 | 0 | 2 | −3.865 |
| 8 | Cameroon | 7 | 0 | 6 | 1 | 1 | −3.872 |

Source: ESPNcricinfo

T20I series
| No. | Date | Team 1 | Captain 1 | Team 2 | Captain 2 | Venue | Result |
|---|---|---|---|---|---|---|---|
| T20I 1924 | 1 December | Eswatini | Melusi Magagula | Ghana | Obed Harvey | IPRC Cricket Ground, Kigali | Ghana by 25 runs |
| T20I 1925 | 1 December | Sierra Leone | George Ngegba | Tanzania | Abhik Patwa | Gahanga International Cricket Stadium, Kigali | Tanzania by 9 wickets (DLS) |
| T20I 1926 | 1 December | Eswatini | Melusi Magagula | Gambia | Peter Campbell | IPRC Cricket Ground, Kigali | Eswatini by 5 wickets |
| T20I 1927 | 1 December | Mozambique | Filipe Cossa | Nigeria | Sylvester Okpe | Gahanga International Cricket Stadium, Kigali | Nigeria by 8 wickets |
| T20I 1928 | 2 December | Ghana | Samson Awiah | Mozambique | Filipe Cossa | IPRC Cricket Ground, Kigali | Mozambique by 7 wickets |
| T20I 1929 | 2 December | Nigeria | Sylvester Okpe | Sierra Leone | George Ngegba | Gahanga International Cricket Stadium, Kigali | Nigeria by 6 wickets |
| T20I 1930 | 2 December | Cameroon | Julien Abega | Sierra Leone | George Ngegba | Gahanga International Cricket Stadium, Kigali | Sierra Leone by 1 wicket |
| T20I 1931 | 2 December | Eswatini | Melusi Magagula | Mozambique | Filipe Cossa | IPRC Cricket Ground, Kigali | Mozambique by 9 wickets |
| T20I 1932 | 4 December | Cameroon | Julien Abega | Mozambique | Filipe Cossa | Gahanga International Cricket Stadium, Kigali | Mozambique by 9 wickets |
| T20I 1933 | 4 December | Eswatini | Melusi Magagula | Nigeria | Sylvester Okpe | IPRC Cricket Ground, Kigali | Nigeria by 118 runs |
| T20I 1934 | 4 December | Gambia | Peter Campbell | Nigeria | Sylvester Okpe | IPRC Cricket Ground, Kigali | Nigeria by 9 wickets |
| T20I 1935 | 4 December | Ghana | Obed Harvey | Tanzania | Abhik Patwa | Gahanga International Cricket Stadium, Kigali | Tanzania by 4 wickets |
| T20I 1936 | 5 December | Eswatini | Melusi Magagula | Sierra Leone | George Ngegba | IPRC Cricket Ground, Kigali | Sierra Leone by 4 runs |
| T20I 1937 | 5 December | Mozambique | Filipe Cossa | Tanzania | Abhik Patwa | Gahanga International Cricket Stadium, Kigali | Tanzania by 6 wickets |
| T20I 1938 | 5 December | Cameroon | Julien Abega | Nigeria | Sylvester Okpe | Gahanga International Cricket Stadium, Kigali | Nigeria by 17 runs (DLS) |
| T20I 1939 | 5 December | Ghana | Obed Harvey | Sierra Leone | George Ngegba | IPRC Cricket Ground, Kigali | Sierra Leone by 18 runs (DLS) |
| T20I 1940 | 6 December | Gambia | Peter Campbell | Sierra Leone | George Ngegba | IPRC Cricket Ground, Kigali | Sierra Leone by 8 wickets |
| T20I 1941 | 6 December | Eswatini | Melusi Magagula | Tanzania | Abhik Patwa | Gahanga International Cricket Stadium, Kigali | Tanzania by 66 runs |
| T20I 1942 | 6 December | Cameroon | Julien Abega | Ghana | Obed Harvey | IPRC Cricket Ground, Kigali | Ghana by 107 runs |
| T20I 1943 | 6 December | Gambia | Ismaila Tamba | Tanzania | Abhik Patwa | Gahanga International Cricket Stadium, Kigali | Tanzania by 10 wickets |
| T20I 1944 | 8 December | Cameroon | Julien Abega | Eswatini | Melusi Magagula | IPRC Cricket Ground, Kigali | No result |
| T20I 1945 | 8 December | Gambia | Ismaila Tamba | Ghana | Obed Harvey | Gahanga International Cricket Stadium, Kigali | Ghana by 138 runs (DLS) |
| T20I 1946 | 8 December | Gambia | Peter Campbell | Mozambique | Filipe Cossa | IPRC Cricket Ground, Kigali | Mozambique by 40 runs (DLS) |
| T20I 1947 | 8 December | Nigeria | Sylvester Okpe | Tanzania | Abhik Patwa | Gahanga International Cricket Stadium, Kigali | No result |
| T20I 1948 | 9 December | Cameroon | Julien Abega | Gambia | Peter Campbell | IPRC Cricket Ground, Kigali | Gambia by 11 runs |
| T20I 1949 | 9 December | Mozambique | Filipe Cossa | Sierra Leone | George Ngegba | Gahanga International Cricket Stadium, Kigali | Mozambique by 5 wickets |
| T20I 1950 | 9 December | Cameroon | Julien Abega | Tanzania | Abhik Patwa | IPRC Cricket Ground, Kigali | Tanzania by 184 runs |
| T20I 1951 | 9 December | Ghana | Obed Harvey | Nigeria | Sylvester Okpe | Gahanga International Cricket Stadium, Kigali | Nigeria by 6 wickets |

=== 2022 East Africa T20 Series ===
| Pos | Team | Pld | W | L | NR | Pts | NRR |
|---|---|---|---|---|---|---|---|
| 1 | Uganda | 12 | 9 | 1 | 2 | 20 | 2.731 |
| 2 | Tanzania | 12 | 6 | 4 | 2 | 14 | 0.956 |
| 3 | Rwanda | 12 | 1 | 11 | 0 | 2 | −3.155 |

Source: ESPNcricinfo

T20I series
| No. | Date | Team 1 | Captain 1 | Team 2 | Captain 2 | Venue | Result |
|---|---|---|---|---|---|---|---|
| T20I 1952 | 13 December | Rwanda | Clinton Rubagumya | Tanzania | Abhik Patwa | Gahanga International Cricket Stadium, Kigali | Tanzania by 72 runs |
| T20I 1953 | 13 December | Rwanda | Clinton Rubagumya | Tanzania | Abhik Patwa | Gahanga International Cricket Stadium, Kigali | Tanzania by 5 wickets (DLS) |
| T20I 1954 | 14 December | Rwanda | Clinton Rubagumya | Uganda | Brian Masaba | Gahanga International Cricket Stadium, Kigali | Uganda by 85 runs |
| T20I 1955 | 14 December | Tanzania | Abhik Patwa | Uganda | Brian Masaba | Gahanga International Cricket Stadium, Kigali | No result |
| T20I 1958 | 15 December | Rwanda | Clinton Rubagumya | Uganda | Kenneth Waiswa | Gahanga International Cricket Stadium, Kigali | Uganda by 133 runs |
| T20I 1959 | 15 December | Tanzania | Kassim Nassoro | Uganda | Brian Masaba | Gahanga International Cricket Stadium, Kigali | Uganda by 13 runs |
| T20I 1962 | 16 December | Rwanda | Kevin Irakoze | Uganda | Brian Masaba | Gahanga International Cricket Stadium, Kigali | Uganda by 97 runs |
| T20I 1963 | 16 December | Rwanda | Kevin Irakoze | Tanzania | Kassim Nassoro | Gahanga International Cricket Stadium, Kigali | Rwanda by 1 run (DLS) |
| T20I 1966 | 18 December | Tanzania | Kassim Nassoro | Uganda | Brian Masaba | Gahanga International Cricket Stadium, Kigali | Uganda by 2 runs |
| T20I 1967 | 18 December | Rwanda | Clinton Rubagumya | Tanzania | Kassim Nassoro | Gahanga International Cricket Stadium, Kigali | Tanzania by 6 wickets |
| T20I 1970 | 19 December | Tanzania | Kassim Nassoro | Uganda | Brian Masaba | Gahanga International Cricket Stadium, Kigali | Tanzania by 5 wickets |
| T20I 1971 | 19 December | Rwanda | Clinton Rubagumya | Uganda | Brian Masaba | Gahanga International Cricket Stadium, Kigali | Uganda by 9 wickets |
| T20I 1972 | 20 December | Rwanda | Clinton Rubagumya | Tanzania | Kassim Nassoro | Gahanga International Cricket Stadium, Kigali | Tanzania by 31 runs |
| T20I 1973 | 20 December | Rwanda | Clinton Rubagumya | Uganda | Brian Masaba | Gahanga International Cricket Stadium, Kigali | Uganda by 7 wickets |
| T20I 1978 | 22 December | Rwanda | Clinton Rubagumya | Tanzania | Kassim Nassoro | Gahanga International Cricket Stadium, Kigali | Tanzania by 28 runs |
| T20I 1979 | 22 December | Tanzania | Kassim Nassoro | Uganda | Brian Masaba | Gahanga International Cricket Stadium, Kigali | Uganda by 7 runs |
| T20I 1982 | 23 December | Rwanda | Clinton Rubagumya | Uganda | Brian Masaba | Gahanga International Cricket Stadium, Kigali | Uganda by 3 runs |
| T20I 1983 | 23 December | Tanzania | Kassim Nassoro | Uganda | Brian Masaba | Gahanga International Cricket Stadium, Kigali | No result |

=== 2022–23 Kenya Women's Quadrangular Series ===
| Pos | Team | Pld | W | L | NR | Pts | NRR |
|---|---|---|---|---|---|---|---|
| 1 | Uganda | 6 | 5 | 1 | 0 | 10 | 1.579 |
| 2 | Kenya | 6 | 4 | 2 | 0 | 8 | 1.522 |
| 3 | Tanzania | 6 | 3 | 3 | 0 | 6 | 1.086 |
| 4 | Qatar | 6 | 0 | 6 | 0 | 0 | −4.389 |

Source: ESPNcricinfo

Round-robin
| No. | Date | Team 1 | Captain 1 | Team 2 | Captain 2 | Venue | Result |
|---|---|---|---|---|---|---|---|
| WT20I 1315 | 13 December | Kenya | Queentor Abel | Uganda | Concy Aweko | Gymkhana Club Ground, Nairobi | Uganda by 8 wickets |
| WT20I 1316 | 13 December | Kenya | Queentor Abel | Tanzania | Fatuma Kibasu | Gymkhana Club Ground, Nairobi | Kenya by 6 wickets |
| WT20I 1317 | 14 December | Qatar | Sabeeja Panayan | Uganda | Concy Aweko | Gymkhana Club Ground, Nairobi | Uganda by 7 wickets |
| WT20I 1318 | 14 December | Qatar | Sabeeja Panayan | Tanzania | Fatuma Kibasu | Gymkhana Club Ground, Nairobi | Tanzania by 77 runs |
| WT20I 1321 | 15 December | Tanzania | Fatuma Kibasu | Uganda | Concy Aweko | Gymkhana Club Ground, Nairobi | Uganda by 6 wickets |
| WT20I 1322 | 15 December | Kenya | Queentor Abel | Qatar | Sabeeja Panayan | Gymkhana Club Ground, Nairobi | Kenya by 9 wickets |
| WT20I 1323 | 17 December | Tanzania | Fatuma Kibasu | Uganda | Concy Aweko | Gymkhana Club Ground, Nairobi | Tanzania by 14 runs |
| WT20I 1324 | 17 December | Kenya | Queentor Abel | Qatar | Sabeeja Panayan | Gymkhana Club Ground, Nairobi | Kenya by 85 runs |
| WT20I 1327 | 18 December | Kenya | Sharon Juma | Uganda | Concy Aweko | Gymkhana Club Ground, Nairobi | Uganda by 6 wickets |
| WT20I 1328 | 18 December | Qatar | Sabeeja Panayan | Tanzania | Fatuma Kibasu | Gymkhana Club Ground, Nairobi | Tanzania by 96 runs |
| WT20I 1330 | 19 December | Qatar | Sabeeja Panayan | Uganda | Concy Aweko | Gymkhana Club Ground, Nairobi | Uganda by 7 wickets |
| WT20I 1331 | 19 December | Kenya | Sharon Juma | Tanzania | Fatuma Kibasu | Gymkhana Club Ground, Nairobi | Kenya by 2 wickets |
Play-offs
| No. | Date | Team 1 | Captain 1 | Team 2 | Captain 2 | Venue | Result |
| WT20I 1334 | 21 December | Qatar | Sabeeja Panayan | Tanzania | Fatuma Kibasu | Gymkhana Club Ground, Nairobi | Tanzania by 28 runs |
| WT20I 1336 | 21 December | Kenya | Sharon Juma | Uganda | Concy Aweko | Gymkhana Club Ground, Nairobi | Uganda by 6 wickets |

=== 2022–23 Malaysia Quadrangular Series ===
| Pos | Team | Pld | W | L | NR | Pts | NRR |
|---|---|---|---|---|---|---|---|
| 1 | Malaysia | 6 | 5 | 0 | 1 | 11 | 3.510 |
| 2 | Bahrain | 6 | 3 | 2 | 1 | 7 | 0.017 |
| 3 | Qatar | 6 | 2 | 2 | 2 | 6 | 0.410 |
| 4 | Singapore | 6 | 0 | 6 | 0 | 0 | −3.241 |

Source: ESPNcricinfo

Round-robin
| No. | Date | Team 1 | Captain 1 | Team 2 | Captain 2 | Venue | Result |
|---|---|---|---|---|---|---|---|
| T20I 1956 | 15 December | Malaysia | Ahmad Faiz | Bahrain | Sarfaraz Ali | UKM-YSD Cricket Oval, Bangi | Malaysia by 11 runs |
| T20I 1957 | 15 December | Qatar | Mohammed Rizlan | Singapore | Janak Prakash | UKM-YSD Cricket Oval, Bangi | Qatar by 5 wickets |
| T20I 1960 | 16 December | Malaysia | Ahmad Faiz | Qatar | Mohammed Rizlan | UKM-YSD Cricket Oval, Bangi | Malaysia by 8 wickets |
| T20I 1961 | 16 December | Bahrain | Sarfaraz Ali | Singapore | Janak Prakash | UKM-YSD Cricket Oval, Bangi | Match tied (Bahrain won S/O) |
| T20I 1964 | 18 December | Bahrain | Sarfaraz Ali | Qatar | Mohammed Rizlan | UKM-YSD Cricket Oval, Bangi | Bahrain by 13 runs |
| T20I 1965 | 18 December | Malaysia | Ahmad Faiz | Singapore | Janak Prakash | UKM-YSD Cricket Oval, Bangi | Malaysia by 120 runs |
| T20I 1968 | 19 December | Qatar | Mohammed Rizlan | Singapore | Janak Prakash | UKM-YSD Cricket Oval, Bangi | Qatar by 8 wickets |
| T20I 1969 | 19 December | Malaysia | Ahmad Faiz | Bahrain | Sarfaraz Ali | UKM-YSD Cricket Oval, Bangi | Malaysia by 7 wickets |
| T20I 1974 | 21 December | Bahrain | Sarfaraz Ali | Singapore | Janak Prakash | UKM-YSD Cricket Oval, Bangi | Bahrain by 6 wickets |
| T20I 1975 | 21 December | Malaysia | Ahmad Faiz | Qatar | Mohammed Rizlan | UKM-YSD Cricket Oval, Bangi | No result |
| T20I 1976 | 22 December | Malaysia | Ahmad Faiz | Singapore | Janak Prakash | UKM-YSD Cricket Oval, Bangi | Malaysia by 143 runs |
| T20I 1977 | 22 December | Bahrain | Sarfaraz Ali | Qatar | Mohammed Rizlan | UKM-YSD Cricket Oval, Bangi | No result |
Play-offs
| No. | Date | Team 1 | Captain 1 | Team 2 | Captain 2 | Venue | Result |
| T20I 1980 | 23 December | Qatar | Mohammed Rizlan | Singapore | Janak Prakash | UKM-YSD Cricket Oval, Bangi | Qatar by 9 wickets (DLS) |
| T20I 1981 | 23 December | Malaysia | Ahmad Faiz | Bahrain | Sarfaraz Ali | UKM-YSD Cricket Oval, Bangi | Bahrain by 6 wickets |

=== Philippines women in Cambodia ===
WT20I series
| No. | Date | Home captain | Away captain | Venue | Result |
|---|---|---|---|---|---|
| WT20I 1333 | 21 December | Pech Pisa | Josie Arimas | ISF Sports Ground, Phnom Penh | Cambodia by 7 runs |
| WT20I 1335 | 21 December | Pech Pisa | Josie Arimas | ISF Sports Ground, Phnom Penh | Cambodia by 7 wickets |
| WT20I 1337 | 22 December | Pech Pisa | Josie Arimas | ISF Sports Ground, Phnom Penh | Philippines by 10 runs |
| WT20I 1338 | 22 December | Pech Pisa | Josie Arimas | ISF Sports Ground, Phnom Penh | Cambodia by 6 wickets |
| WT20I 1340 | 23 December | Pech Pisa | Josie Arimas | ISF Sports Ground, Phnom Penh | Cambodia by 27 runs |
| WT20I 1341 | 23 December | Pech Pisa | Catherine Bagaoisan | ISF Sports Ground, Phnom Penh | Cambodia by 6 wickets |

== February ==
=== Singapore women in Cambodia ===
WT20I series
| No. | Date | Home captain | Away captain | Venue | Result |
|---|---|---|---|---|---|
| WT20I 1351 | 8 February | Pech Pisa | Shafina Mahesh | Morodok Techo National Stadium, Phnom Penh | Singapore by 6 wickets |
| WT20I 1352 | 9 February | Pech Pisa | Shafina Mahesh | Morodok Techo National Stadium, Phnom Penh | Singapore by 49 runs |
| WT20I 1353 | 10 February | Pech Pisa | Shafina Mahesh | Morodok Techo National Stadium, Phnom Penh | Singapore by 8 wickets |
| WT20I 1355 | 11 February | Pech Pisa | Shafina Mahesh | Morodok Techo National Stadium, Phnom Penh | Singapore by 9 wickets |
| WT20I 1358 | 12 February | Pech Pisa | Shafina Mahesh | Morodok Techo National Stadium, Phnom Penh | Singapore by 8 wickets |

=== Bermuda in Argentina ===
T20I series
| No. | Date | Home captain | Away captain | Venue | Result |
|---|---|---|---|---|---|
| T20I 1996 | 21 February | Hernán Fennell | Delray Rawlins | St Albans Club, Buenos Aires | Bermuda by 6 wickets |
| T20I 1997 | 22 February | Hernán Fennell | Delray Rawlins | Belgrano Athletic Club Ground, Buenos Aires | Bermuda by 107 runs |

=== 2023 ACC Men's Challenger Cup ===
| Pos | Team | Pld | W | L | NR | Pts | NRR |
|---|---|---|---|---|---|---|---|
| 1 | Bahrain | 3 | 3 | 0 | 0 | 6 | 4.844 |
| 2 | Bhutan | 3 | 1 | 2 | 0 | 2 | −0.340 |
| 3 | Iran | 3 | 1 | 2 | 0 | 2 | −0.779 |
| 4 | Maldives | 3 | 1 | 2 | 0 | 2 | −2.473 |

Source: Cricket.com

| Pos | Team | Pld | W | L | NR | Pts | NRR |
|---|---|---|---|---|---|---|---|
| 1 | Saudi Arabia | 3 | 3 | 0 | 0 | 6 | 4.844 |
| 2 | Thailand | 3 | 2 | 1 | 0 | 4 | 2.053 |
| 3 | Indonesia | 3 | 1 | 2 | 0 | 2 | 0.243 |
| 4 | Myanmar | 3 | 0 | 3 | 0 | 0 | −5.293 |

Source: Cricket.com

=== Isle of Man in Spain ===
T20I series
| No. | Date | Home captain | Away captain | Venue | Result |
|---|---|---|---|---|---|
| T20I 1998 | 24 February | Christian Munoz-Mills | Matthew Ansell | La Manga Club (Bottom Ground), Cartagena | Spain by 81 runs |
| T20I 1999 | 24 February | Christian Munoz-Mills | Matthew Ansell | La Manga Club (Bottom Ground), Cartagena | No result |
| T20I 2000 | 25 February | Christian Munoz-Mills | Matthew Ansell | La Manga Club (Bottom Ground), Cartagena | Spain by 8 wickets |
| T20I 2001 | 25 February | Christian Munoz-Mills | Matthew Ansell | La Manga Club (Bottom Ground), Cartagena | Spain by 6 wickets |
| T20I 2004 | 26 February | Christian Munoz-Mills | Carl Hartmann | La Manga Club (Bottom Ground), Cartagena | Spain by 7 wickets |
| T20I 2005 | 26 February | Christian Munoz-Mills | Carl Hartmann | La Manga Club (Bottom Ground), Cartagena | Spain by 10 wickets |

=== 2023 ICC T20 World Cup Americas Sub-Regional Qualifier ===
| Pos | Team | Pld | W | L | NR | Pts | NRR |
|---|---|---|---|---|---|---|---|
| 1 | Bermuda | 4 | 4 | 0 | 0 | 8 | 4.897 |
| 2 | Cayman Islands | 4 | 3 | 1 | 0 | 6 | −0.638 |
| 3 | Panama | 4 | 1 | 3 | 0 | 2 | −0.413 |
| 4 | Argentina | 4 | 1 | 3 | 0 | 2 | −1.527 |
| 5 | Bahamas | 4 | 1 | 3 | 0 | 2 | −1.785 |

Source: ESPNcricinfo

T20I series
| No. | Date | Team 1 | Captain 1 | Team 2 | Captain 2 | Venue | Result |
|---|---|---|---|---|---|---|---|
| T20I 2002 | 25 February | Argentina | Hernán Fennell | Panama | Irfan Hafejee | Hurlingham Club Ground, Buenos Aires | Panama by 53 runs |
| T20I 2003 | 25 February | Bermuda | Delray Rawlins | Cayman Islands | Ramon Sealy | St Albans Club, Buenos Aires | Bermuda by 96 runs |
| T20I 2006 | 26 February | Bahamas | Marc Taylor | Panama | Irfan Hafejee | Hurlingham Club Ground, Buenos Aires | Bahamas by 4 wickets |
| T20I 2007 | 26 February | Argentina | Hernán Fennell | Bermuda | Delray Rawlins | Belgrano Athletic Club Ground, Buenos Aires | Bermuda by 110 runs |
| T20I 2008 | 28 February | Bahamas | Marc Taylor | Cayman Islands | Ramon Sealy | St Albans Club, Buenos Aires | Cayman Islands by 31 runs |
| T20I 2009 | 28 February | Bermuda | Delray Rawlins | Panama | Irfan Hafejee | Belgrano Athletic Club Ground, Buenos Aires | Bermuda by 60 runs |
| T20I 2010 | 2 March | Cayman Islands | Ramon Sealy | Panama | Irfan Hafejee | Hurlingham Club Ground, Buenos Aires | Cayman Islands by 12 runs |
| T20I 2011 | 2 March | Argentina | Hernán Fennell | Bahamas | Marc Taylor | St Albans Club, Buenos Aires | Argentina by 43 runs |
| T20I 2012 | 4 March | Bahamas | Marc Taylor | Bermuda | Delray Rawlins | Hurlingham Club Ground, Buenos Aires | Bermuda by 9 wickets |
| T20I 2013 | 4 March | Argentina | Hernán Fennell | Cayman Islands | Ramon Sealy | Belgrano Athletic Club Ground, Buenos Aires | Cayman Islands by 3 wickets |

== March ==
=== 2022–23 Hong Kong Quadrangular Series ===
| Pos | Team | Pld | W | L | NR | Pts | NRR |
|---|---|---|---|---|---|---|---|
| 1 | Hong Kong | 3 | 3 | 0 | 0 | 6 | 0.580 |
| 2 | Malaysia | 3 | 2 | 1 | 0 | 4 | 0.951 |
| 3 | Bahrain | 3 | 1 | 2 | 0 | 2 | −0.958 |
| 4 | Kuwait | 3 | 0 | 3 | 0 | 0 | −0.594 |

Source: ESPNcricinfo

Round-robin
| No. | Date | Team 1 | Captain 1 | Team 2 | Captain 2 | Venue | Result |
|---|---|---|---|---|---|---|---|
| T20I 2014 | 8 March | Kuwait | Mohammed Aslam | Malaysia | Ahmad Faiz | Mission Road Ground, Mong Kok | Malaysia by 3 wickets |
| T20I 2015 | 8 March | Hong Kong | Nizakat Khan | Bahrain | Sarfaraz Ali | Mission Road Ground, Mong Kok | Hong Kong by 15 runs |
| T20I 2016 | 9 March | Bahrain | Sarfaraz Ali | Malaysia | Ahmad Faiz | Mission Road Ground, Mong Kok | Malaysia by 53 runs |
| T20I 2017 | 9 March | Hong Kong | Nizakat Khan | Kuwait | Mohammed Aslam | Mission Road Ground, Mong Kok | Hong Kong by 11 runs |
| T20I 2019 | 11 March | Bahrain | Sarfaraz Ali | Kuwait | Mohammed Aslam | Mission Road Ground, Mong Kok | Bahrain by 4 wickets |
| T20I 2020 | 11 March | Hong Kong | Nizakat Khan | Malaysia | Ahmad Faiz | Mission Road Ground, Mong Kok | Hong Kong by 4 wickets |
Play-offs
| No. | Date | Team 1 | Captain 1 | Team 2 | Captain 2 | Venue | Result |
| T20I 2021 | 12 March | Bahrain | Sarfaraz Ali | Kuwait | Mohammed Aslam | Mission Road Ground, Mong Kok | Kuwait by 6 wickets |
| T20I 2022 | 12 March | Hong Kong | Nizakat Khan | Malaysia | Ahmad Faiz | Mission Road Ground, Mong Kok | Hong Kong by 39 runs |

=== 2023 Pacific Island Cricket Challenge (Men) ===
| Pos | Team | Pld | W | L | NR | Pts | NRR |
|---|---|---|---|---|---|---|---|
| 1 | Papua New Guinea XI | 4 | 3 | 1 | 0 | 6 | 1.516 |
| 2 | Vanuatu | 4 | 3 | 1 | 0 | 6 | 0.992 |
| 3 | ANZAC Barbarians | 4 | 2 | 2 | 0 | 4 | 1.249 |
| 4 | Fiji | 4 | 2 | 2 | 0 | 4 | −0.409 |
| 5 | Samoa | 4 | 0 | 4 | 0 | 0 | −3.187 |

Source: ESPNcricinfo

Round-robin
| No. | Date | Team 1 | Captain 1 | Team 2 | Captain 2 | Venue | Result |
|---|---|---|---|---|---|---|---|
| 1st Match | 11 March | Fiji | Peni Vuniwaqa | ANZAC Barbarians | Lewin Maladay | Albert Park Ground 1, Suva | Fiji by 27 runs |
| 2nd Match | 11 March | Papua New Guinea XI | Jason Kila | Samoa | Sitanisilao Toutai | Albert Park Ground 1, Suva | Papua New Guinea XI by 54 runs |
| 3rd Match | 13 March | Fiji | Peni Vuniwaqa | Papua New Guinea XI | Jason Kila | Albert Park Ground 1, Suva | Papua New Guinea XI by 8 wickets (DLS) |
| T20I 2024 | 13 March | Samoa | Sitanisilao Toutai | Vanuatu | Patrick Matautaava | Albert Park Ground 1, Suva | Vanuatu by 17 runs |
| 5th Match | 14 March | ANZAC Barbarians | Lewin Maladay | Vanuatu | Patrick Matautaava | Albert Park Ground 1, Suva | Vanuatu by 4 wickets |
| T20I 2025 | 14 March | Fiji | Peni Vuniwaqa | Samoa | Sitanisilao Toutai | Albert Park Ground 1, Suva | Fiji by 66 runs |
| 7th Match | 15 March | ANZAC Barbarians | Lewin Maladay | Samoa | Sitanisilao Toutai | Albert Park Ground 1, Suva | ANZAC Barbarians by 118 runs |
| 8th Match | 15 March | Papua New Guinea XI | Jason Kila | Vanuatu | Patrick Matautaava | Albert Park Ground 1, Suva | Papua New Guinea XI by 7 wickets |
| 9th Match | 16 March | ANZAC Barbarians | Lewin Maladay | Papua New Guinea XI | Jason Kila | Albert Park Ground 1, Suva | ANZAC Barbarians by 11 runs |
| T20I 2027 | 16 March | Fiji | Peni Vuniwaqa | Vanuatu | Patrick Matautaava | Albert Park Ground 1, Suva | Vanuatu by 102 runs |
Play-offs
| No. | Date | Team 1 | Captain 1 | Team 2 | Captain 2 | Venue | Result |
| T20I 2028 | 17 March | Fiji | Peni Vuniwaqa | Vanuatu | Patrick Matautaava | Albert Park Ground 2, Suva | Vanuatu by 26 runs |
| 2nd Semi-final | 17 March | Papua New Guinea XI | Jason Kila | Samoa | Sitanisilao Toutai | Albert Park Ground 2, Suva | Papua New Guinea XI by 58 runs |
| T20I 2029 | 18 March | Fiji | Peni Vuniwaqa | Samoa | Sitanisilao Toutai | Albert Park Ground 1, Suva | Fiji by 22 runs |
| Final | 18 March | Papua New Guinea XI | Jason Kila | Vanuatu | Patrick Matautaava | Albert Park Ground 2, Suva | Papua New Guinea XI by 7 runs |

=== 2023 Pacific Island Cricket Challenge (Women) ===
| Pos | Team | Pld | W | L | NR | Pts | NRR |
|---|---|---|---|---|---|---|---|
| 1 | Papua New Guinea | 4 | 4 | 0 | 0 | 8 | 5.806 |
| 2 | Vanuatu | 4 | 3 | 1 | 0 | 6 | 1.044 |
| 3 | Fiji | 4 | 2 | 2 | 0 | 4 | −1.235 |
| 4 | Samoa | 4 | 1 | 3 | 0 | 2 | −2.389 |
| 5 | ANZAC Barbarians | 4 | 0 | 4 | 0 | 0 | −3.690 |

Source: ESPNcricinfo

Round-robin
| No. | Date | Team 1 | Captain 1 | Team 2 | Captain 2 | Venue | Result |
|---|---|---|---|---|---|---|---|
| WT20I 1379 | 11 March | Papua New Guinea | Kaia Arua | Samoa | Kolotita Nonu | Albert Park Ground 2, Suva | Papua New Guinea by 160 runs |
| Match 2 | 11 March | Fiji | Ruci Muriyalo | ANZAC Barbarians | Tayla Seymour | Albert Park Ground 2, Suva | Fiji by 8 wickets |
| WT20I 1380 | 13 March | Samoa | Kolotita Nonu | Vanuatu | Selina Solman | Albert Park Ground 2, Suva | Vanuatu by 21 runs (DLS) |
| WT20I 1381 | 13 March | Fiji | Ruci Muriyalo | Papua New Guinea | Kaia Arua | Albert Park Ground 2, Suva | Papua New Guinea by 114 runs |
| WT20I 1382 | 14 March | Fiji | Ruci Muriyalo | Samoa | Kolotita Nonu | Albert Park Ground 2, Suva | Fiji by 9 wickets |
| Match 6 | 14 March | ANZAC Barbarians | Tayla Seymour | Vanuatu | Selina Solman | Albert Park Ground 2, Suva | Vanuatu by 51 runs |
| WT20I 1383 | 15 March | Papua New Guinea | Kaia Arua | Vanuatu | Selina Solman | Albert Park Ground 2, Suva | Papua New Guinea by 9 wickets |
| Match 8 | 15 March | ANZAC Barbarians | Tayla Seymour | Samoa | Kolotita Nonu | Albert Park Ground 2, Suva | Samoa by 6 wickets |
| WT20I 1384 | 16 March | Fiji | Ruci Muriyalo | Vanuatu | Selina Solman | Albert Park Ground 2, Suva | Vanuatu by 7 wickets |
| Match 10 | 16 March | ANZAC Barbarians | Tayla Seymour | Papua New Guinea | Kaia Arua | Albert Park Ground 2, Suva | Papua New Guinea by 8 wickets |
Play-offs
| No. | Date | Team 1 | Captain 1 | Team 2 | Captain 2 | Venue | Result |
| WT20I 1385 | 17 March | Papua New Guinea | Kaia Arua | Samoa | Kolotita Nonu | Albert Park Ground 1, Suva | Papua New Guinea by 46 runs |
| WT20I 1386 | 17 March | Fiji | Ruci Muriyalo | Vanuatu | Selina Solman | Albert Park Ground 1, Suva | Vanuatu by 6 wickets |
| WT20I 1387 | 18 March | Fiji | Ruci Muriyalo | Samoa | Kolotita Nonu | Albert Park Ground 1, Suva | Samoa by 56 runs |
| WT20I 1388 | 18 March | Papua New Guinea | Kaia Arua | Vanuatu | Selina Solman | Albert Park Ground 2, Suva | Papua New Guinea by 100 runs |

=== 2023 Nigeria Invitational Women's T20I Tournament ===
| Pos | Team | Pld | W | L | NR | Pts | NRR |
|---|---|---|---|---|---|---|---|
| 1 | Rwanda | 4 | 4 | 0 | 0 | 8 | 4.458 |
| 2 | Nigeria | 4 | 3 | 1 | 0 | 6 | 1.424 |
| 3 | Sierra Leone | 4 | 2 | 2 | 0 | 4 | −0.209 |
| 4 | Cameroon | 4 | 1 | 3 | 0 | 2 | −2.345 |
| 5 | Ghana | 4 | 0 | 4 | 0 | 0 | −3.322 |

Source: ESPNcricinfo

Round-robin
| No. | Date | Team 1 | Captain 1 | Team 2 | Captain 2 | Venue | Result |
|---|---|---|---|---|---|---|---|
| WT20I 1389 | 27 March | Nigeria | Blessing Etim | Sierra Leone | Fatmata Parkinson | Tafawa Balewa Square Cricket Oval, Lagos | Nigeria by 6 wickets |
| WT20I 1390 | 27 March | Ghana | Rhyda Ofori | Rwanda | Marie Bimenyimana | Tafawa Balewa Square Cricket Oval, Lagos | Rwanda by 117 runs |
| WT20I 1391 | 28 March | Nigeria | Blessing Etim | Cameroon | Michelle Ekani | Tafawa Balewa Square Cricket Oval, Lagos | Nigeria by 7 wickets |
| WT20I 1392 | 28 March | Ghana | Rhyda Ofori | Sierra Leone | Fatmata Parkinson | Tafawa Balewa Square Cricket Oval, Lagos | Sierra Leone by 7 wickets |
| WT20I 1393 | 29 March | Rwanda | Marie Bimenyimana | Sierra Leone | Fatmata Parkinson | Tafawa Balewa Square Cricket Oval, Lagos | Rwanda by 5 wickets |
| WT20I 1394 | 29 March | Cameroon | Michelle Ekani | Ghana | Rhyda Ofori | Tafawa Balewa Square Cricket Oval, Lagos | Cameroon by 39 runs |
| WT20I 1395 | 31 March | Nigeria | Blessing Etim | Ghana | Rhyda Ofori | Tafawa Balewa Square Cricket Oval, Lagos | Nigeria by 62 runs |
| WT20I 1396 | 31 March | Cameroon | Michelle Ekani | Rwanda | Marie Bimenyimana | Tafawa Balewa Square Cricket Oval, Lagos | Rwanda by 126 runs |
| WT20I 1397 | 1 April | Cameroon | Michelle Ekani | Sierra Leone | Fatmata Parkinson | Tafawa Balewa Square Cricket Oval, Lagos | Sierra Leone by 5 wickets |
| WT20I 1398 | 1 April | Nigeria | Favour Eseigbe | Rwanda | Marie Bimenyimana | Tafawa Balewa Square Cricket Oval, Lagos | Rwanda by 39 runs |
Play-offs
| No. | Date | Team 1 | Captain 1 | Team 2 | Captain 2 | Venue | Result |
| WT20I 1399 | 2 April | Cameroon | Michelle Ekani | Sierra Leone | Fatmata Parkinson | Tafawa Balewa Square Cricket Oval, Lagos | Sierra Leone by 9 wickets |
| WT20I 1400 | 2 April | Nigeria | Blessing Etim | Rwanda | Marie Bimenyimana | Tafawa Balewa Square Cricket Oval, Lagos | Nigeria by 9 runs |

== April ==
=== Gibraltar in Portugal ===
T20I series
| No. | Date | Home captain | Away captain | Venue | Result |
|---|---|---|---|---|---|
| T20I 2042 | 10 April | Najjam Shahzad | Avinash Pai | Santarem Cricket Ground, Albergaria | Portugal by 124 runs |
| T20I 2043 | 11 April | Najjam Shahzad | Avinash Pai | Santarem Cricket Ground, Albergaria | Portugal by 5 wickets |
| T20I 2044 | 11 April | Najjam Shahzad | Avinash Pai | Santarem Cricket Ground, Albergaria | Portugal by 5 wickets |

=== 2023 ACC Men's Premier Cup ===
| Pos | Team | Pld | W | L | T | NR | Pts | NRR |
|---|---|---|---|---|---|---|---|---|
| 1 | Nepal | 4 | 3 | 0 | 0 | 1 | 7 | 1.497 |
| 2 | Oman | 4 | 3 | 1 | 0 | 0 | 6 | 0.377 |
| 3 | Malaysia | 4 | 2 | 2 | 0 | 0 | 4 | 0.240 |
| 4 | Saudi Arabia | 4 | 1 | 2 | 0 | 1 | 3 | −1.101 |
| 5 | Qatar | 4 | 0 | 4 | 0 | 0 | 0 | −1.056 |

Source: ESPNcricinfo

| Pos | Team | Pld | W | L | T | NR | Pts | NRR |
|---|---|---|---|---|---|---|---|---|
| 1 | United Arab Emirates | 4 | 3 | 1 | 0 | 0 | 6 | 2.468 |
| 2 | Kuwait | 4 | 3 | 1 | 0 | 0 | 6 | 0.223 |
| 3 | Hong Kong | 4 | 2 | 1 | 0 | 1 | 5 | 1.031 |
| 4 | Bahrain | 4 | 1 | 2 | 0 | 1 | 3 | 0.019 |
| 5 | Singapore | 4 | 0 | 4 | 0 | 0 | 0 | −3.028 |

Source: ESPNcricinfo

Group stage
| No. | Date | Team 1 | Captain 1 | Team 2 | Captain 2 | Venue | Result |
|---|---|---|---|---|---|---|---|
| Scorecard | 18 April | Nepal | Rohit Paudel | Malaysia | Ahmad Faiz | Tribhuvan University International Cricket Ground, Kirtipur | Nepal won by 6 wickets |
| Scorecard | 18 April | Hong Kong | Nizakat Khan | Singapore | Aritra Dutta | Mulpani Cricket Stadium, Kageshwari-Manohara | Hong Kong won by 8 wickets |
| Scorecard | 19 April | Kuwait | Mohammed Aslam | United Arab Emirates | Muhammad Waseem | Tribhuvan University International Cricket Ground, Kirtipur | United Arab Emirates won by 143 runs |
| Scorecard | 19 April | Oman | Zeeshan Maqsood | Qatar | Mohammed Rizlan | Mulpani Cricket Stadium, Kageshwari-Manohara | Oman won by 40 runs |
| Scorecard | 20 April | Bahrain | Haider Butt | Singapore | Aritra Dutta | Tribhuvan University International Cricket Ground, Kirtipur | Bahrain won by 132 runs |
| Scorecard | 20 April | Malaysia | Ahmad Faiz | Saudi Arabia | Hisham Sheikh | Mulpani Cricket Stadium, Kageshwari-Manohara | Malaysia won by 8 wickets |
| ODI 4568 | 21 April | Nepal | Rohit Paudel | Oman | Zeeshan Maqsood | Tribhuvan University International Cricket Ground, Kirtipur | Nepal won by 84 runs |
| Scorecard | 21 April | Hong Kong | Nizakat Khan | United Arab Emirates | Muhammad Waseem | Mulpani Cricket Stadium, Kageshwari-Manohara | Hong Kong won by 67 runs (DLS method) |
| Scorecard | 22 April | Qatar | Mohammed Rizlan | Saudi Arabia | Hisham Sheikh | Tribhuvan University International Cricket Ground, Kirtipur | Saudi Arabia won by 7 wickets |
| Scorecard | 22 April | Bahrain | Haider Butt | Kuwait | Mohammed Aslam | Mulpani Cricket Stadium, Kageshwari-Manohara | Kuwait won by 2 wickets |
| Scorecard | 23 April | Singapore | Aritra Dutta | United Arab Emirates | Muhammad Waseem | Tribhuvan University International Cricket Ground, Kirtipur | United Arab Emirates won by 201 runs |
| Scorecard | 23 April | Malaysia | Ahmad Faiz | Oman | Zeeshan Maqsood | Mulpani Cricket Stadium, Kageshwari-Manohara | Oman won by 8 wickets |
| Scorecard | 24 April | Bahrain | Haider Butt | Hong Kong | Nizakat Khan | Tribhuvan University International Cricket Ground, Kirtipur | Match abandoned |
| Scorecard | 24 April | Nepal | Rohit Paudel | Saudi Arabia | Hisham Sheikh | Mulpani Cricket Stadium, Kageshwari-Manohara | Match abandoned |
| Scorecard | 25 April | Kuwait | Mohammed Aslam | Singapore | Aritra Dutta | Tribhuvan University International Cricket Ground, Kirtipur | Kuwait won by 4 wickets |
| Scorecard | 25 April | Malaysia | Ahmad Faiz | Qatar | Mohammed Rizlan | Mulpani Cricket Stadium, Kageshwari-Manohara | Malaysia won by 3 wickets |
| Scorecard | 26 April | Oman | Zeeshan Maqsood | Saudi Arabia | Hisham Sheikh | Tribhuvan University International Cricket Ground, Kirtipur | Oman won by 72 runs |
| Scorecard | 26 April | Bahrain | Haider Butt | United Arab Emirates | Muhammad Waseem | Mulpani Cricket Stadium, Kageshwari-Manohara | United Arab Emirates won by 8 wickets |
| Scorecard | 27 April | Nepal | Rohit Paudel | Qatar | Mohammed Rizlan | Tribhuvan University International Cricket Ground, Kirtipur | Nepal won by 68 runs |
| Scorecard | 27 April | Hong Kong | Nizakat Khan | Kuwait | Mohammed Aslam | Mulpani Cricket Stadium, Kageshwari-Manohara | Kuwait won by 30 runs |
Semi-finals
| No. | Date | Team 1 | Captain 1 | Team 2 | Captain 2 | Venue | Result |
| Scorecard | 29 April | Nepal | Rohit Paudel | Kuwait | Mohammed Aslam | Tribhuvan University International Cricket Ground, Kirtipur | No result |
| ODI 4570 | 29 April | Oman | Zeeshan Maqsood | United Arab Emirates | Muhammad Waseem | Mulpani Cricket Stadium, Kageshwari-Manohara | United Arab Emirates won by 2 runs (DLS method) |
3rd-Place play-off
| No. | Date | Team 1 | Captain 1 | Team 2 | Captain 2 | Venue | Result |
| Scorecard | 30 April | Kuwait | Mohammed Aslam | Oman | Zeeshan Maqsood | Tribhuvan University International Cricket Ground, Kirtipur | No result |
Final
| No. | Date | Team 1 | Captain 1 | Team 2 | Captain 2 | Venue | Result |
| ODI 4572 | 1–2 May | Nepal | Rohit Paudel | United Arab Emirates | Muhammad Waseem | Tribhuvan University International Cricket Ground, Kirtipur | Nepal won by 7 wickets |

=== 2023 Victoria Series ===
| Pos | Team | Pld | W | L | NR | Pts | NRR |
|---|---|---|---|---|---|---|---|
| 1 | Uganda | 4 | 3 | 0 | 1 | 7 | 1.287 |
| 2 | Tanzania | 4 | 2 | 2 | 0 | 4 | 1.876 |
| 3 | United Arab Emirates | 4 | 2 | 2 | 0 | 4 | 0.585 |
| 4 | Rwanda | 4 | 2 | 2 | 0 | 4 | −0.882 |
| 5 | Kenya | 4 | 0 | 3 | 1 | 1 | −3.196 |

Source: ESPNcricinfo

Round-robin
| No. | Date | Team 1 | Captain 1 | Team 2 | Captain 2 | Venue | Result |
|---|---|---|---|---|---|---|---|
| WT20I 1401 | 18 April | Kenya | Sharon Juma | United Arab Emirates | Chaya Mughal | Lugogo Stadium, Kampala | United Arab Emirates by 15 runs |
| WT20I 1402 | 18 April | Uganda | Concy Aweko | Rwanda | Marie Bimenyimana | Lugogo Stadium, Kampala | Uganda by 7 wickets |
| WT20I 1403 | 19 April | Tanzania | Fatuma Kibasu | United Arab Emirates | Chaya Mughal | Lugogo Stadium, Kampala | Tanzania by 7 wickets |
| WT20I 1404 | 19 April | Kenya | Sharon Juma | Rwanda | Marie Bimenyimana | Lugogo Stadium, Kampala | Rwanda by 47 runs |
| WT20I 1405 | 20 April | Kenya | Sharon Juma | Tanzania | Fatuma Kibasu | Lugogo Stadium, Kampala | Tanzania by 101 runs |
| WT20I 1406 | 20 April | Uganda | Concy Aweko | United Arab Emirates | Chaya Mughal | Lugogo Stadium, Kampala | Uganda by 6 wickets |
| WT20I 1407 | 21 April | Uganda | Concy Aweko | Tanzania | Fatuma Kibasu | Lugogo Stadium, Kampala | Uganda by 3 runs |
| WT20I 1408 | 21 April | Rwanda | Marie Bimenyimana | United Arab Emirates | Chaya Mughal | Lugogo Stadium, Kampala | United Arab Emirates by 60 runs |
| WT20I 1408a | 22 April | Uganda | Concy Aweko | Kenya | Sharon Juma | Lugogo Stadium, Kampala | Match abandoned |
| WT20I 1409 | 22 April | Rwanda | Marie Bimenyimana | Tanzania | Fatuma Kibasu | Lugogo Stadium, Kampala | Rwanda by 7 runs |
Final
| No. | Date | Team 1 | Captain 1 | Team 2 | Captain 2 | Venue | Result |
| WT20I 1409a | 23 April | Uganda | Concy Aweko | Tanzania | Fatuma Kibasu | Lugogo Stadium, Kampala | Match abandoned |

=== 2023 Capricorn Women's Quadrangular Series ===
| Pos | Team | Pld | W | L | NR | Pts | NRR |
|---|---|---|---|---|---|---|---|
| 1 | Namibia | 6 | 5 | 1 | 0 | 10 | 0.760 |
| 2 | Uganda | 6 | 3 | 3 | 0 | 6 | 0.024 |
| 3 | United Arab Emirates | 6 | 2 | 4 | 0 | 4 | 0.604 |
| 4 | Hong Kong | 6 | 2 | 4 | 0 | 4 | −1.345 |

Source: ESPNcricinfo

Round-robin
| No. | Date | Team 1 | Captain 1 | Team 2 | Captain 2 | Venue | Result |
|---|---|---|---|---|---|---|---|
| WT20I 1409b | 24 April | Namibia | Irene van Zyl | Hong Kong | Kary Chan | United Ground, Windhoek | Match abandoned |
| WT20I 1411 | 25 April | Uganda | Concy Aweko | United Arab Emirates | Chaya Mughal | United Ground, Windhoek | United Arab Emirates by 50 runs |
| WT20I 1412 | 25 April | Namibia | Irene van Zyl | Hong Kong | Kary Chan | United Ground, Windhoek | Namibia by 60 runs |
| WT20I 1413 | 26 April | Hong Kong | Kary Chan | United Arab Emirates | Chaya Mughal | United Ground, Windhoek | Hong Kong by 1 wicket |
| WT20I 1415 | 27 April | Hong Kong | Kary Chan | Uganda | Concy Aweko | United Ground, Windhoek | Uganda by 3 wickets |
| WT20I 1416 | 27 April | Namibia | Irene van Zyl | United Arab Emirates | Chaya Mughal | United Ground, Windhoek | Namibia by 4 wickets |
| WT20I 1418 | 28 April | Namibia | Irene van Zyl | Hong Kong | Kary Chan | United Ground, Windhoek | Namibia by 5 runs |
| WT20I 1419 | 29 April | Uganda | Concy Aweko | United Arab Emirates | Chaya Mughal | United Ground, Windhoek | Uganda by 29 runs |
| WT20I 1420 | 29 April | Namibia | Irene van Zyl | Uganda | Concy Aweko | United Ground, Windhoek | Namibia by 8 runs |
| WT20I 1422 | 30 April | Hong Kong | Kary Chan | Uganda | Concy Aweko | United Ground, Windhoek | Hong Kong by 8 wickets |
| WT20I 1423 | 30 April | Namibia | Irene van Zyl | United Arab Emirates | Chaya Mughal | United Ground, Windhoek | Namibia by 7 runs (DLS) |
| WT20I 1426 | 1 May | Hong Kong | Kary Chan | United Arab Emirates | Chaya Mughal | United Ground, Windhoek | United Arab Emirates by 72 runs |
| WT20I 1427 | 1 May | Namibia | Irene van Zyl | Uganda | Concy Aweko | United Ground, Windhoek | Uganda by 4 wickets |
Play-offs
| No. | Date | Team 1 | Captain 1 | Team 2 | Captain 2 | Venue | Result |
| WT20I 1427a | 2 May | Hong Kong | Kary Chan | United Arab Emirates | Chaya Mughal | United Ground, Windhoek | Match abandoned |
| WT20I 1428 | 2 May | Namibia | Irene van Zyl | Uganda | Concy Aweko | United Ground, Windhoek | Uganda by 3 runs |

== See also ==
- International cricket in 2022–23
