= 2023 Capricorn Women's Quadrangular Series =

International cricket tournament

- Dates: 24 April – 2 May 2023
- Administrator: Cricket Namibia
- Cricket format: Twenty20 International
- Tournament format(s): Double round-robin and play-offs
- Host: Namibia
- Champions: Uganda (1st title)
- Runners-up: Namibia
- Participants: 4
- Matches: 14
- Player of the series: (Namibia) Wilka Mwatile
- Most runs: (United Arab Emirates) Theertha Satish (220)
- Most wickets: (Namibia) Kayleen Green (13)

The 2023 Capricorn Women's Quadrangular Series was a women's Twenty20 International (T20I) cricket tournament that took place in Namibia from 24 April to 2 May 2023. The tournament was played at the United Ground in Windhoek. The participating teams were the women's national sides of Namibia, Hong Kong, Uganda and United Arab Emirates. Uganda replaced United States who withdrew from the tournament.

Uganda defeated the hosts in a low-scoring last game of the round-robin to join them in the final. Uganda went on to defeat Namibia again in the final by 3 runs to win the tournament. The victory secured Uganda's second title in two weeks after also having won the 2023 Victoria Series in April.

== Squads ==
Hong Kong	Namibia	Uganda	United Arab Emirates
Kary Chan (c); Natasha Miles (vc); Maryam Bibi; Betty Chan; Hiu Ying Cheung (wk); Yasmin Daswani (wk); Mariko Hill; Elysa Hubbard; Marina Lamplough; Iqra Sahar; Shanzeen Shahzad (wk); Alison Siu; Yee Shan To; Ruchitha Venkatesh	Irene van Zyl (c); Naomi Benjamin; Jurriene Diergaardt; Dietlind Foerster; Merczerly Gorases (wk); Kayleen Green; Victoria Hamunyela; Yasmeen Khan (wk); Bianca Manuel; Mekelaye Mwatile; Wilka Mwatile; Adri van der Merwe; Edelle van Zyl; Sune Wittmann	Concy Aweko (c); Janet Mbabazi (vc); Sarah Akiteng; Prosscovia Alako; Irene Alumo; Evelyn Anyipo; Kevin Awino (wk); Esther Iloku (wk); Phiona Kulume; Patricia Malemikia; Rita Musamali; Immaculate Nakisuuyi; Stephani Nampiina; Gloria Obukor	Chaya Mughal (c); Esha Oza (vc); Kavisha Egodage; Geethika Jyothis; Lavanya Keny; Vaishnave Mahesh; Indhuja Nandakumar; Avanee Patil; Rinitha Rajith; Rishitha Rajith; Theertha Satish (wk); Khushi Sharma; Sanchin Singh (wk); Archara Supriya

== Round-robin ==
=== Points table ===
Pos	Team	Pld	W	L	NR	Pts	NRR
1	Namibia	6	5	1	0	10	0.760
2	Uganda	6	3	3	0	6	0.024
3	United Arab Emirates	6	2	4	0	4	0.604
4	Hong Kong	6	2	4	0	4	−1.345

Source: ESPNcricinfo

Advanced to the final
Advanced to the third-place play-off

=== Fixtures ===
24 April 2023
14:30
Scorecard

Namibia	v	Hong Kong

Match abandoned
United Ground, Windhoek
Umpires: Esau Heynes (Nam) and Susca Loftie-Eaton (Nam)

- No toss.
- No play was possible due to rain.
- The match was rescheduled to be played on 28 April.

25 April 2023
09:45
Scorecard

United Arab Emirates; 120/6 (20 overs)	v	Uganda; 70 (18.3 overs)
Theertha Satish 39 (35); Irene Alumo 2/28 (4 overs)		Kevin Awino 21 (32); Khushi Sharma 4/9 (3 overs)

United Arab Emirates won by 50 runs
United Ground, Windhoek
Umpires: Henriette Hugo (Nam) and Ewoud Lassen (Nam)
Player of the match: Khushi Sharma (UAE)

- Uganda won the toss and elected to field.
- Khushi Sharma (UAE) took her first hat-trick in WT20Is.

25 April 2023
14:30
Scorecard

Namibia; 116/6 (20 overs)	v	Hong Kong; 56 (18.4 overs)
Adri van der Merwe 41* (40); Maryam Bibi 3/27 (4 overs)		Mariko Hill 11 (11); Wilka Mwatile 3/10 (4 overs)

Namibia won by 60 runs
United Ground, Windhoek
Umpires: Esau Heynes (Nam) and Henriette Hugo (Nam)
Player of the match: Wilka Mwatile (Nam)

- Hong Kong won the toss and elected to field.

26 April 2023
14:30
Scorecard

United Arab Emirates; 139/5 (20 overs)	v	Hong Kong; 140/9 (20 overs)
Chaya Mughal 52 (46); Kary Chan 2/32 (4 overs)		Mariko Hill 76 (50); Esha Oza 3/29 (4 overs)

Hong Kong won by 1 wicket
United Ground, Windhoek
Umpires: Henriette Hugo (Nam) and Susca Loftie-Eaton (Nam)
Player of the match: Mariko Hill (HK)

- Hong Kong won the toss and elected to field.

27 April 2023
09:45
Scorecard

Hong Kong; 68 (20 overs)	v	Uganda; 72/7 (14 overs)
Kary Chan 17 (28); Concy Aweko 3/10 (4 overs)		Phiona Kulume 15* (21); Betty Chan 2/7 (4 overs)

Uganda won by 3 wickets
United Ground, Windhoek
Umpires: Ewoud Lassen (Nam) and Susca Loftie-Eaton (Nam)
Player of the match: Concy Aweko (Uga)

- Hong Kong won the toss and elected to bat.

27 April 2023
14:30
Scorecard

United Arab Emirates; 93/8 (20 overs)	v	Namibia; 94/6 (17.2 overs)
Theertha Satish 35 (35); Irene van Zyl 3/24 (4 overs)		Adri van der Merwe 33 (34); Vaishnave Mahesh 3/14 (4 overs)

Namibia won by 4 wickets
United Ground, Windhoek
Umpires: Esau Heynes (Nam) and Henriette Hugo (Nam)
Player of the match: Kayleen Green (Nam)

- Namibia won the toss and elected to field.

28 April 2023
09:45
Scorecard

Namibia; 112/7 (20 overs)	v	Hong Kong; 107 (19.5 overs)
Sune Wittmann 53 (49); Betty Chan 3/16 (4 overs)		Natasha Miles 31 (42); Sune Wittmann 3/29 (4 overs)

Namibia won by 5 runs
United Ground, Windhoek
Umpires: Esau Heynes (Nam) and Ewoud Lassen (Nam)
Player of the match: Sune Wittmann (Nam)

- Hong Kong won the toss and elected to field.
- This match was arranged after the match on 24 April was abandoned.

29 April 2023
09:45
Scorecard

Uganda; 159/3 (20 overs)	v	United Arab Emirates; 130/4 (20 overs)
Prosscovia Alako 85 (55); Chaya Mughal 1/12 (2 overs)		Kavisha Egodage 51 (52); Stephanie Nampiina 2/7 (1 over)

Uganda won by 29 runs
United Ground, Windhoek
Umpires: Ewoud Lassen (Nam) and Susca Loftie-Eaton (Nam)
Player of the match: Prosscovia Alako (Uga)

- Uganda won the toss and elected to bat.

29 April 2023
14:30
Scorecard

Namibia; 94 (19.3 overs)	v	Uganda; 86 (18.5 overs)
Wilka Mwatile 23 (9); Stephanie Nampiina 4/15 (4 overs)		Patricia Malemikia 16 (13); Jurriene Diergaardt 3/13 (3.5 overs)

Namibia won by 8 runs
United Ground, Windhoek
Umpires: Esau Heynes (Nam) and Ewoud Lassen (Nam)
Player of the match: Wilka Mwatile (Nam)

- Namibia won the toss and elected to bat.

30 April 2023
09:45
Scorecard

Uganda; 98 (19.2 overs)	v	Hong Kong; 102/2 (17.3 overs)
Janet Mbabazi 27 (27); Ruchitha Venkatesh 3/8 (4 overs)		Natasha Miles 50* (52); Irene Alumo 2/16 (4 overs)

Hong Kong won by 8 wickets
United Ground, Windhoek
Umpires: Esau Heynes (Nam) and Susca Loftie-Eaton (Nam)
Player of the match: Ruchitha Venkatesh (HK)

- Hong Kong won the toss and elected to field.

30 April 2023
14:30
Scorecard

Namibia; 78/8 (20 overs)	v	United Arab Emirates; 50/6 (14 overs)
Wilka Mwatile 24* (30); Indhuja Nandakumar 3/7 (4 overs)		Chaya Mughal 11 (15); Irene van Zyl 2/6 (3 overs)

Namibia won by 7 runs (DLS method)
United Ground, Windhoek
Umpires: Esau Heynes (Nam) and Susca Loftie-Eaton (Nam)
Player of the match: Wilka Mwatile (Nam)

- Namibia won the toss and elected to bat.
- No further play was possible due to rain.

1 May 2023
09:45
Scorecard

United Arab Emirates; 182/4 (20 overs)	v	Hong Kong; 110/6 (20 overs)
Theertha Satish 93 (60); Betty Chan 3/30 (4 overs)		Marina Lamplough 33* (26); Esha Oza 3/19 (4 overs)

United Arab Emirates won by 72 runs
United Ground, Windhoek
Umpires: Esau Heynes (Nam) and Ewoud Lassen (Nam)
Player of the match: Theertha Satish (UAE)

- Hong Kong won the toss and elected to field.

1 May 2023
14:30
Scorecard

Namibia; 77/7 (20 overs)	v	Uganda; 79/6 (18.4 overs)
Wilka Mwatile 27* (34); Irene Alumo 2/10 (4 overs)		Kevin Awino 28 (48); Irene van Zyl 3/19 (4 overs)

Uganda won by 4 wickets
United Ground, Windhoek
Umpires: Henriette Hugo (Nam) and Susca Loftie-Eaton (Nam)
Player of the match: Concy Aweko (Uga)

- Namibia won the toss and elected to bat.
- Bianca Manuel (Nam) made her WT20I debut.

== Third-place play-off ==
2 May 2023
09:45
Scorecard

Hong Kong	v	United Arab Emirates

Match abandoned
United Ground, Windhoek
Umpires: Esau Heynes (Nam) and Henriette Hugo (Nam)

- No toss.
- No play was possible due to rain.

== Final ==
2 May 2023
14:30
Scorecard

Uganda; 93/5 (20 overs)	v	Namibia; 90/4 (20 overs)
Immaculate Nakisuuyi 26* (28); Kayleen Green 3/22 (4 overs)		Yasmeen Khan 40* (52); Irene Alumo 2/8 (3 overs)

Uganda won by 3 runs
United Ground, Windhoek
Umpires: Ewoud Lassen (Nam) and Susca Loftie-Eaton (Nam)
Player of the match: Stephani Nampiina (Uga)

- Uganda won the toss and elected to bat.
