= Ghana women's national cricket team =

Cricket team

Ghana
- Flag of Ghana
- Association: Ghana Cricket Association

Personnel
- Captain: Rhyda Ofori Amanfo

International Cricket Council
- ICC status: Associate member (2017); Affiliate member (2002)
- ICC region: Asia
ICC Rankings	Current	Best-ever
T20I	62nd	57th (29 Mar 2023)

T20 Internationals
- First T20I: v Rwanda at Tafawa Balewa Square Cricket Oval, Lagos; 28 March 2022
- Last T20I: v Nigeria at Tafawa Balewa Square Cricket Oval, Lagos; 22 March 2026
T20Is	Played	Won/Lost
Total	11	1/10 (0 ties, 0 no results)
This year	2	0/2 (0 ties, 0 no results)
- As of 22 March 2026

The Ghana national women's cricket team is the team that represents Ghana in international women's cricket.

Ghana participated in the inaugural 2015 North West Africa Cricket Council (NWACC) women's tournament held in The Gambia. The team finished third behind Sierra Leone and Gambia, and ahead of Mali. Ghana hosted the second edition of the tournament in 2016.

In April 2018, the International Cricket Council (ICC) granted full Women's Twenty20 International (WT20I) status to all its members. Therefore, all Twenty20 matches played between Ghana women and other ICC members after 1 July 2018 will have the full WT20I status. Ghana played their first official WT20I matches in March 2022 during the 2022 Nigeria Invitational Women's T20I Tournament.

== Records and statistics ==
International Match Summary — Ghana Women

Last updated 22 March 2026

Playing Record
Format	M	W	L	T	NR	Inaugural Match
Twenty20 Internationals	11	1	10	0	0	12 September 2021

=== Twenty20 International ===
T20I record versus other nations

Records complete to WT20I #2690. Last updated 22 March 2026.

Opponent	M	W	L	T	NR	First match	First win
ICC Associate members
Cameroon	1	0	1	0	0	29 March 2023	
Gambia	1	1	0	0	0	30 March 2022	30 March 2022
Nigeria	3	0	3	0	0	1 April 2022	
Rwanda	3	0	3	0	0	28 March 2022	
Sierra Leone	3	0	3	0	0	29 March 2022	

== See also ==
- List of Ghana women Twenty20 International cricketers
- Ghana national cricket team
