= List of Ghana women Twenty20 International cricketers =

This is a list of Ghana women Twenty20 International cricketers. A Women's Twenty20 International (WT20I) is an international cricket match between two representative teams. A T20I is played under the rules of Twenty20 cricket. In April 2018, the International Cricket Council (ICC) granted full international status to Twenty20 women's matches played between member sides from 1 July 2018 onwards. Ghana women played their first WT20I on 28 March 2022 against Rwanda during the 2022 Nigeria Invitational Women's T20I Tournament in Lagos.

The list is arranged in the order in which each player won her first Twenty20 cap. Where more than one player won her first Twenty20 cap in the same match, those players are listed alphabetically by surname.

== Key ==
General

- ‡ – Captain
- † – Wicket-keeper
- First – Year of debut
- Last – Year of latest game
- Mat – Number of matches played

Batting

- Runs – Runs scored in career
- HS – Highest score
- Avg – Runs scored per dismissal
- * – Batsman remained not out
- 50 – Number of half centuries

Bowling

- Balls – Balls bowled in career
- Wkt – Wickets taken in career
- BBI – Best bowling in an innings
- Ave – Average runs per wicket

Fielding

- Ca – Catches taken
- St – Stumpings affected

== Players ==
Statistics are correct as of 22 March 2026.

Ghana women T20I cricketers
| General | | | | | Batting | | | | Bowling | | | | Fielding | | Ref |
| No. | Name | First | Last | Mat | Runs | HS | Avg | 50 | Balls | Wkt | BBI | Ave | Ca | St | Ref |
|---|---|---|---|---|---|---|---|---|---|---|---|---|---|---|---|
| 1 | Elizabeth Annor | 2022 | 2026 | 10 | 51 | 19 | 5.10 | 0 | 12 | 0 | – | – | 3 | 0 | |
| 2 | Ellen Asante | 2022 | 2026 | 10 | 29 | 12 | 2.90 | 0 | 12 | 0 | – | – | 1 | 0 | |
| 3 | Rozabel Asumadu‡ | 2022 | 2023 | 9 | 28 | 7 | 4.00 | 0 | 6 | 1 | 1/5 | 5.00 | 0 | 0 | |
| 4 | Kate Awuah | 2022 | 2026 | 10 | 89 | 31 | 9.88 | 0 | 185 | 6 | 2/18 | 34.50 | 3 | 0 | |
| 5 | Fati Bawa† | 2022 | 2022 | 4 | 8 | 5* | 4.00 | 0 | – | – | – | – | 0 | 2 | |
| 6 | Miriam Eshun | 2022 | 2026 | 11 | 37 | 12 | 3.70 | 0 | 78 | 6 | 3/20 | 15.33 | 2 | 0 | |
| 7 | Cynthia Konadu | 2022 | 2023 | 6 | 12 | 7 | 2.00 | 0 | 144 | 3 | 1/20 | 37.00 | 0 | 0 | |
| 8 | Emmanuella Nyaaba | 2022 | 2023 | 7 | 19 | 5 | 3.80 | 0 | 132 | 5 | 2/17 | 28.40 | 0 | 0 | |
| 9 | Rhyda Ofori‡ | 2022 | 2023 | 8 | 40 | 24 | 8.00 | 0 | 108 | 0 | – | – | 0 | 0 | |
| 10 | Rashidatu Salia | 2022 | 2026 | 11 | 86 | 20 | 7.81 | 0 | 130 | 5 | 3/19 | 30.40 | 2 | 0 | |
| 11 | Felicia Serwaa | 2022 | 2022 | 5 | 56 | 28 | 11.20 | 0 | – | – | – | – | 0 | 0 | |
| 12 | Ivy Yeboah† | 2022 | 2026 | 6 | 2 | 2 | 0.50 | 0 | – | – | – | – | 1 | 0 | |
| 13 | Janet Alaare | 2022 | 2022 | 3 | 7 | 7* | 7.00 | 0 | 54 | 3 | 3/9 | 13.66 | 0 | 0 | |
| 14 | Beatrice Oduro | 2022 | 2022 | 3 | 0 | 0* | – | 0 | 36 | 3 | 2/4 | 7.66 | 0 | 0 | |
| 15 | Komalpreet Grewal | 2023 | 2023 | 4 | 47 | 19* | 15.66 | 0 | 74 | 3 | 2/19 | 29.00 | 1 | 0 | |
| 16 | Jacqueline Kokam‡† | 2023 | 2026 | 3 | 9 | 5 | 3.00 | 0 | – | – | – | – | 0 | 0 | |
| 17 | Christiana Nyameke | 2023 | 2023 | 1 | – | – | – | – | 12 | 0 | – | – | 0 | 0 | |
| 18 | Rebecca Adotei | 2026 | 2026 | 2 | 11 | 10 | 5.50 | 0 | 42 | 0 | – | – | 0 | 0 | |
| 19 | Grace Essoun | 2026 | 2026 | 2 | 1 | 1 | 1.00 | 0 | 24 | 1 | 1/39 | 39.00 | 0 | 0 | |
| 20 | Grace Quaicoe | 2026 | 2026 | 2 | 0 | 0 | 0.00 | 0 | 42 | 2 | 1/13 | 28.00 | 0 | 0 | |
| 21 | Ernestina Sagoe | 2026 | 2026 | 2 | 3 | 3* | – | 0 | 24 | 1 | 1/26 | 47.00 | 0 | 0 | |
| 22 | Abigail Amuzu | 2026 | 2026 | 1 | 7 | 7 | 7.00 | 0 | – | – | – | – | 1 | 0 | |
| 23 | Esther Bakiweyem | 2026 | 2026 | 1 | 0 | 0 | 0.00 | 0 | 6 | 1 | 1/5 | 5.00 | 0 | 0 | |
