= 2023 Victoria Series =

International cricket tournament

- Dates: 18 – 23 April 2023
- Administrator: Uganda Cricket Association
- Cricket format: Twenty20 International
- Tournament format(s): Round-robin and final
- Host: Uganda
- Champions: Uganda (1st title)
- Runners-up: Tanzania
- Participants: 5
- Matches: 11
- Player of the series: (Rwanda) Henriette Ishimwe
- Most runs: (United Arab Emirates) Kavisha Egodage (112)
- Most wickets: (Uganda) Concy Aweko (7)

The 2023 Victoria Series was a women's Twenty20 International (T20I) cricket tournament that took place in Uganda in April 2023, the second edition of the Victoria Series. Zimbabwe had won the first edition in 2019, but they did not defend the title in this edition due to other commitments. The venue for all of the matches was the Lugogo Stadium in Kampala. The five-team tournament was contested by hosts Uganda, as well as Kenya, Rwanda, Tanzania and United Arab Emirates. The tournament provided all teams with preparation for the 2023 ICC Women's T20 World Cup Africa Qualifier.

After Kenya's last match in the round-robin stage, the team's captain Sharon Juma announced her retirement from international cricket.

Uganda's 3-run win over Tanzania confirmed their place in the final with a game to spare. After the final was abandoned due to rain, Uganda were declared the champions due to having finished top of the round-robin stage. Henriette Ishimwe of Rwanda was named player of the tournament.

== Squads ==
| Kenya | Rwanda | Tanzania | Uganda | United Arab Emirates |
|---|---|---|---|---|
| Sharon Juma (c, wk); Esther Wachira (vc); Mercy Ahono; Lavendah Idambo; Marion Juma; Charity Muthoni; Faith Mutua; Lynz Nabwire; Monicah Ndhambi; Daisy Njoroge; Flavia Odhiambo; Kelvia Ogola; Venasa Ooko; Ann Wanjira | Marie Bimenyimana (c); Sifa Ingabire; Alice Ikuzwe; Rosine Irera; Gisele Ishimwe; Henriette Ishimwe; Immaculee Muhawenimana; Belise Murekatete; Josiane Nyirankundineza; Clarisse Uwase; Geovanis Uwase (wk); Merveille Uwase (wk); Sarah Uwera (wk); Margueritte Vumiliya | Fatuma Kibasu (c); Sophia Jerome; Perice Kamunya; Aisha Mohamed; Mwapwani Mohamedi; Shufaa Mohamedi (wk); Saum Mtae; Sonia Muya; Hudaa Omary; Monica Pascal; Neema Pius; Agnes Qwele; Mwanaidi Swedy; Josephine Ulrik | Concy Aweko (c); Janet Mbabazi (vc); Sarah Akiteng; Prosscovia Alako; Irene Alumo; Evelyn Anyipo; Kevin Awino (wk); Esther Iloku (wk); Phiona Kulume; Patricia Malemikia; Rita Musamali; Immaculate Nakisuuyi; Stephani Nampiina; Gloria Obukor | Chaya Mughal (c); Esha Oza (vc); Kavisha Egodage; Geethika Jyothis; Lavanya Keny; Vaishnave Mahesh; Indhuja Nandakumar; Avanee Patil; Rinitha Rajith; Rishitha Rajith; Theertha Satish (wk); Khushi Sharma; Sanchin Singh (wk); Archara Supriya |

== Round-robin ==
=== Points table ===
| Pos | Team | Pld | W | L | NR | Pts | NRR |
|---|---|---|---|---|---|---|---|
| 1 | Uganda | 4 | 3 | 0 | 1 | 7 | 1.287 |
| 2 | Tanzania | 4 | 2 | 2 | 0 | 4 | 1.876 |
| 3 | United Arab Emirates | 4 | 2 | 2 | 0 | 4 | 0.585 |
| 4 | Rwanda | 4 | 2 | 2 | 0 | 4 | −0.882 |
| 5 | Kenya | 4 | 0 | 3 | 1 | 1 | −3.196 |

Source: ESPNcricinfo

Advanced to the final

=== Fixtures ===
18 April 2023
10:00
Scorecard

| United Arab Emirates; 84/9 (20 overs) | v | Kenya; 69 (20 overs) |
| Chaya Mughal 24 (21); Lavendah Idambo 2/18 (4 overs) | | Venasa Ooko 14 (28); Lavanya Keny 2/2 (2 overs) |

United Arab Emirates won by 15 runs
Lugogo Stadium, Kampala
Umpires: Norbert Abii (Uga) and John Mayeku (Uga)
Player of the match: Chaya Mughal (UAE)

- Kenya won the toss and elected to field.
- Marion Juma, Lynz Nabwire, Ann Wanjira (Ken), Geethika Jyothis, Avanee Patil, Rishitha Rajith and Archara Supriya (UAE) all made their WT20I debuts.

18 April 2023
13:50
Scorecard

| Rwanda; 61 (20 overs) | v | Uganda; 62/3 (11.1 overs) |
| Gisele Ishimwe 19 (40); Concy Aweko 2/8 (4 overs) | | Janet Mbabazi 29* (31); Rosine Irera 1/8 (2 overs) |

Uganda won by 7 wickets
Lugogo Stadium, Kampala
Umpires: Sharon Athuola (Uga) and Simon Kintu (Uga)
Player of the match: Janet Mbabazi (Uga)

- Rwanda won the toss and elected to bat.

19 April 2023
09:30
Scorecard

| United Arab Emirates; 138/5 (20 overs) | v | Tanzania; 140/3 (17.5 overs) |
| Kavisha Egodage 44* (43); Sophia Jerome 1/21 (3 overs) | | Saum Mtae 40 (33); Esha Oza 1/14 (4 overs) |

Tanzania won by 7 wickets
Lugogo Stadium, Kampala
Umpires: Veronique Iriho (Rwa) and John Mayeku (Uga)
Player of the match: Saum Mtae (Tan)

- United Arab Emirates won the toss and elected to bat.
- Mwapwani Mohamedi (Tan) made her WT20I debut.

19 April 2023
13:50
Scorecard

| Rwanda; 88/6 (14 overs) | v | Kenya; 41 (13.1 overs) |
| Henriette Ishimwe 26* (18); Esther Wachira 3/17 (3 overs) | | Sharon Juma 13 (19); Henriette Ishimwe 2/4 (2.1 overs) |

Rwanda won by 47 runs
Lugogo Stadium, Kampala
Umpires: Sharon Athuola (Uga) and Simon Kintu (Uga)
Player of the match: Henriette Ishimwe (Rwa)

- Rwanda won the toss and elected to bat.
- The match was reduced to 14 overs per side due to rain.

20 April 2023
09:30
Scorecard

| Tanzania; 146/4 (17 overs) | v | Kenya; 45 (14.5 overs) |
| Fatuma Kibasu 37 (33); Flavia Odhiambo 4/25 (4 overs) | | Mercy Ahono 12 (27); Perice Kamunya 3/14 (4 overs) |

Tanzania won by 101 runs
Lugogo Stadium, Kampala
Umpires: Norbert Abii (Uga) and Veronique Iriho (Rwa)
Player of the match: Perice Kamunya (Tan)

- Kenya won the toss and elected to field.
- The match was reduced to 17 overs per side due to rain.
- Charity Muthoni (Ken) made her WT20I debut.

20 April 2023
13:50
Scorecard

| United Arab Emirates; 98/7 (20 overs) | v | Uganda; 99/4 (17 overs) |
| Kavisha Egodage 38 (48); Concy Aweko 2/15 (4 overs) | | Kevin Awino 25 (33); Vaishnave Mahesh 2/13 (4 overs) |

Uganda won by 6 wickets
Lugogo Stadium, Kampala
Umpires: Simon Kintu (Uga) and John Mayeku (Uga)
Player of the match: Kevin Awino (Uga)

- United Arab Emirates won the toss and elected to bat.

21 April 2023
09:30
Scorecard

| Uganda; 79/8 (15 overs) | v | Tanzania; 76 (15 overs) |
| Kevin Awino 27 (24); Sophia Jerome 3/10 (3 overs) | | Agnes Qwele 28 (28); Janet Mbabazi 4/21 (3 overs) |

Uganda won by 3 runs
Lugogo Stadium, Kampala
Umpires: Veronique Iriho (Rwa) and John Mayeku (Uga)
Player of the match: Concy Aweko (Uga)

- Tanzania won the toss and elected to field.
- The match was reduced to 15 overs per side due to rain.

21 April 2023
13:50
Scorecard

| United Arab Emirates; 117/7 (20 overs) | v | Rwanda; 57/8 (20 overs) |
| Esha Oza 37 (35); Belise Murekatete 2/24 (4 overs) | | Henriette Ishimwe 18 (28); Vaishnave Mahesh 2/5 (4 overs) |

United Arab Emirates won by 60 runs
Lugogo Stadium, Kampala
Umpires: Sharon Athuola (Uga) and Simon Kintu (Uga)
Player of the match: Kavisha Egodage (UAE)

- United Arab Emirates won the toss and elected to bat.

22 April 2023
09:30
Scorecard

| Uganda | v | Kenya |

Match abandoned
Lugogo Stadium, Kampala
Umpires: Veronique Iriho (Rwa) and Simon Kintu (Uga)

- No toss.
- No play was possible due to rain.

22 April 2023
13:50
Scorecard

| Rwanda; 53/4 (6 overs) | v | Tanzania; 46/4 (6 overs) |
| Henriette Ishimwe 22* (12); Aisha Mohamed 1/6 (1 over) | | Saum Mtae 19 (13); Henriette Ishimwe 2/2 (1 overs) |

Rwanda won by 7 runs
Lugogo Stadium, Kampala
Umpires: Norbert Abii (Uga) and Sharon Athuola (Uga)
Player of the match: Henriette Ishimwe (Rwa)

- Rwanda won the toss and elected to bat.
- The match was reduced to 6 overs per side due to rain.
- Sonia Muya (Tan) made her WT20I debut.

== Final ==
23 April 2023
13:50
Scorecard

| Uganda | v | Tanzania |

Match abandoned
Lugogo Stadium, Kampala
Umpires: Veronique Iriho (Rwa) and John Mayeku (Uga)

- No toss.
- No play was possible due to rain.
