= Rhyda Ofori Amanfo =

Ghanaian cricketer (born 1997)

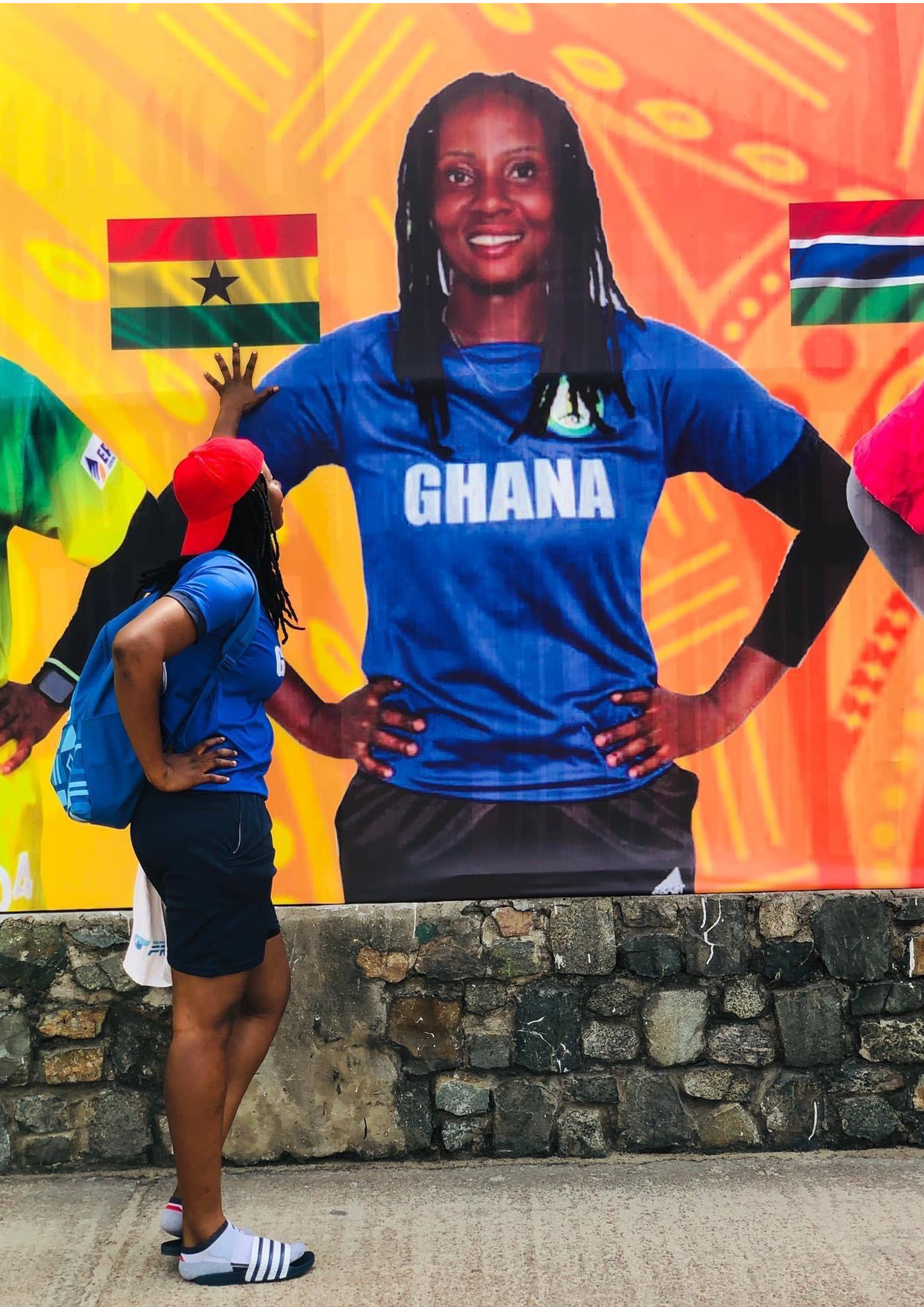
- Rhyda Ofori Amanfo captain of the Ghana women's national cricket team

Personal information
- Born: 6 June 1997 (age 29)
- Batting: Right-handed
- Bowling: Right-arm medium

International information
- National side: Ghana
- T20I debut (cap 4): 28 March 2022 v Rwanda
- Last T20I: 31 March 2023 v Nigeria

Career statistics
Competition	WT20I
Matches	8
Runs scored	40
Batting average	8.00
100s/50s	0/0
Top score	24
Balls bowled	108
Wickets	0
Bowling average	–
5 wickets in innings	–
10 wickets in match	–
Best bowling	–
Catches/stumpings	0/–
- Source: , 7 October 2024

Rhyda Ofori Amanfo (born 6 June 1997) is a Ghanaian sportswoman and a cricketer. She was appointed as captain of the Ghana women's national cricket team in 2015.

== Education ==
Rhyda is a graduate of Obuasi Senior High Technical School and Wesley College of Education.

== Career ==
=== Cricket ===
Rhyda is the captain of the Ghana women's national cricket team, her appointment came in 2015.

She made her Women's Twenty20 International (T20) debut for Ghana against Rwanda on 28 March 2022 in Lagos, Nigeria. Ghana placed fourth in the tournament.

Rhyda also captains Pomposo Royals, a senior women’s T20 League team in the Ashanti Region of Ghana.

== See also ==
- List of Ghana women Twenty20 International cricketers
