= 2022–23 Kenya Women's Quadrangular Series =

International cricket tournament

- Dates: 13 – 21 December 2022
- Administrator: Cricket Kenya
- Cricket format: Women's Twenty20 International
- Tournament format(s): Double round-robin and final
- Host: Kenya
- Champions: Uganda
- Runners-up: Kenya
- Participants: 4
- Matches: 14
- Player of the series: (Uganda) Janet Mbabazi
- Most runs: (Tanzania) Fatuma Kibasu (221)
- Most wickets: (Tanzania) Perice Kamunya (10) (Kenya) Flavia Odhiambo (10)

The 2022–23 Kenya Women's Quadrangular Series was a Women's Twenty20 International (WT20I) cricket tournament that took place in Nairobi in December 2022. Originally announced as a tri-nation series involving Kenya, Uganda and Qatar, the tournament became a quadrangular event with the addition of Tanzania. The African sides were in action for the first time since the 2022 Kwibuka T20 Tournament that was played in June 2022.

Uganda secured top spot in the round-robin with a game to spare. Kenya defeated Tanzania by 2 wickets in the last game of the round-robin stage to set up a final against Uganda. Uganda went on to defeat the hosts in the final by 6 wickets to win the tournament. Tanzania defeated winless Qatar in the third-place play-off. Uganda's Janet Mbabazi was named player of the tournament.

== Squads ==
Kenya	Qatar	Tanzania	Uganda
Queentor Abel (c); Sharon Juma (vc, wk); Veronica Abuga; Josephine Abwom; Mercy Ahono; Lavendah Idambo; Melvin Khagoitsa; Mary Mwangi (wk); Monicah Ndhambi; Daisy Njoroge; Flavia Odhiambo; Kelvia Ogola; Venasa Ooko; Esther Wachira	Sabeeja Panayan (c); Hiral Agarwal; Sarrinah Ahmed; Aysha; Shahreen Bahadur; Saachi Dhadwal; Khadija Imtiaz; Trupti Kale (wk); Devanandha Kavinisseri; Aleena Khan; Angeline Mare; Lavanya Pillai; Rochelle Quyn; Shrutiben Rana (wk)	Fatuma Kibasu (c); Perice Kamunya; Sheila Kizito; Linda Massawe (wk); Aisha Mohamed; Shufaa Mohamedi (wk); Saum Mtae; Hudaa Omary; Tabu Omary; Monica Pascal; Agnes Qwele; Nasra Saidi; Josephine Ulrik; Mwanamvua Ushanga; Rahima Yahaya	Concy Aweko (c); Sarah Akiteng; Prosscovia Alako; Irene Alumo; Evelyn Anyipo; Kevin Awino (wk); Esther Iloku (wk); Phiona Kulume; Patricia Malemikia; Janet Mbabazi; Rita Musamali; Immaculate Nakisuuyi; Stephani Nampiina; Gloria Obukor

== Round-robin ==
=== Points table ===
Pos	Team	Pld	W	L	NR	Pts	NRR
1	Uganda	6	5	1	0	10	1.579
2	Kenya	6	4	2	0	8	1.522
3	Tanzania	6	3	3	0	6	1.086
4	Qatar	6	0	6	0	0	−4.389

Source: ESPNcricinfo

Qualified for the final
Advanced to the third place play-off

=== Fixtures ===
13 December 2022
10:30
Scorecard

Kenya; 54/3 (10 overs)	v	Uganda; 58/2 (9.4 overs)
Mary Mwangi 13 (21); Evelyn Anyipo 1/9 (2 overs)		Prosscovia Alako 27 (21); Esther Wachira 1/10 (2 overs)

Uganda won by 8 wickets
Gymkhana Club Ground, Nairobi
Umpires: Lydiah Kaparo (Ken) and Charles Kariuki (Ken)
Player of the match: Prosscovia Alako (Uga)

- Uganda won the toss and elected to field.
- The match was reduced to 10 overs per side due to rain.

13 December 2022
14:30
Scorecard

Tanzania; 90 (19 overs)	v	Kenya; 91/4 (18.5 overs)
Saum Mtae 36 (33); Flavia Odhiambo 4/22 (4 overs)		Queentor Abel 31 (36); Agnes Qwele 1/14 (4 overs)

Kenya won by 6 wickets
Gymkhana Club Ground, Nairobi
Umpires: Lydiah Kaparo (Ken) and Nicholas Otieno (Ken)
Player of the match: Flavia Odhiambo (Ken)

- Tanzania won the toss and elected to bat.
- Sheila Kizito and Aisha Mohamed (Tan) both made their WT20I debuts.

14 December 2022
10:30
Scorecard

Qatar; 54 (19.4 overs)	v	Uganda; 55/3 (10.3 overs)
Shrutiben Rana 9 (18); Irene Alumo 3/3 (4 overs)		Janet Mbabazi 23 (29); Rochelle Quyn 2/5 (2.3 overs)

Uganda won by 7 wickets
Gymkhana Club Ground, Nairobi
Umpires: Asgarali Kassam (Ken) and Isaac Oyieko (Ken)
Player of the match: Irene Alumo (Uga)

- Uganda won the toss and elected to field.

14 December 2022
14:30
Scorecard

Tanzania; 175/4 (20 overs)	v	Qatar; 98/9 (20 overs)
Fatuma Kibasu 52 (44); Rochelle Quyn 2/30 (4 overs)		Aysha 28 (21); Nasra Saidi 2/12 (4 overs)

Tanzania won by 77 runs
Gymkhana Club Ground, Nairobi
Umpires: Asgarali Kassam (Ken) and Isaac Oyieko (Ken)
Player of the match: Fatuma Kibasu (Tan)

- Tanzania won the toss and elected to bat.

15 December 2022
10:30
Scorecard

Tanzania; 73 (17.2 overs)	v	Uganda; 74/4 (12.4 overs)
Hudaa Omary 25 (33); Sarah Akiteng 1/8 (4 overs)		Janet Mbabazi 17 (19); Nasra Saidi 2/13 (3.4 overs)

Uganda won by 6 wickets
Gymkhana Club Ground, Nairobi
Umpires: Joseph Karuri (Ken) and David Odhiambo (Ken)
Player of the match: Janet Mbabazi (Uga)

- Uganda won the toss and elected to field.

15 December 2022
14:30
Scorecard

Qatar; 39 (17.2 overs)	v	Kenya; 42/1 (5.5 overs)
Aysha 12 (16); Queentor Abel 3/4 (4 overs)		Queentor Abel 21* (18); Sabeeja Panayan 1/23 (2.5 overs)

Kenya won by 9 wickets
Gymkhana Club Ground, Nairobi
Umpires: Lydiah Kaparo (Ken) and David Odhiambo (Ken)
Player of the match: Queentor Abel (Ken)

- Qatar won the toss and elected to bat.
- Lavanya Pillai (Qat) made her WT20I debut.

17 December 2022
10:30
Scorecard

Tanzania; 116/8 (20 overs)	v	Uganda; 102/8 (20 overs)
Hudaa Omary 29 (30); Sarah Akiteng 2/15 (3 overs)		Janet Mbabazi 33 (39); Agnes Qwele 3/14 (4 overs)

Tanzania won by 14 runs
Gymkhana Club Ground, Nairobi
Umpires: Lydiah Kaparo (Ken) and Isaac Oyieko (Ken)
Player of the match: Agnes Qwele (Tan)

- Uganda won the toss and elected to field.
- Josephine Ulrik (Tan) made her WT20I debut.

17 December 2022
14:30
Scorecard

Kenya; 166/6 (20 overs)	v	Qatar; 81/6 (20 overs)
Venasa Ooko 48 (28); Rochelle Quyn 2/36 (4 overs)		Aysha 30 (33); Mercy Ahono 2/6 (2 overs)

Kenya won by 85 runs
Gymkhana Club Ground, Nairobi
Umpires: Asgarali Kassam (Ken) and Isaac Oyieko (Ken)
Player of the match: Venasa Ooko (Ken)

- Kenya won the toss and elected to bat.
- Mercy Ahono (Ken) made her WT20I debut.

18 December 2022
10:30
Scorecard

Kenya; 107/4 (20 overs)	v	Uganda; 112/4 (16.2 overs)
Mary Mwangi 31 (38); Janet Mbabazi 1/10 (4 overs)		Prosscovia Alako 38 (31); Flavia Odhiambo 3/20 (4 overs)

Uganda won by 6 wickets
Gymkhana Club Ground, Nairobi
Umpires: Charles Kariuki (Ken) and Joseph Karuri (Ken)
Player of the match: Prosscovia Alako (Uga)

- Uganda won the toss and elected to field.

18 December 2022
14:30
Scorecard

Tanzania; 201/2 (20 overs)	v	Qatar; 105/8 (20 overs)
Fatuma Kibasu 101* (62); Hiral Agarwal 1/31 (4 overs)		Shahreen Bahadur 30 (33); Perice Kamunya 2/9 (4 overs)

Tanzania won by 96 runs
Gymkhana Club Ground, Nairobi
Umpires: Charles Kariuki (Ken) and David Odhiambo (Ken)
Player of the match: Fatuma Kibasu (Tan)

- Tanzania won the toss and elected to bat.
- Sarrinah Ahmed (Qat) and Rahima Yahaya (Tan) both made their WT20I debuts.
- Fatuma Kibasu became the fastest player to reach 1,000 runs in Women's Twenty20 Internationals (30 innings).

19 December 2022
10:30
Scorecard

Qatar; 85/6 (20 overs)	v	Uganda; 86/3 (11.4 overs)
Saachi Dhadwal 51* (65); Janet Mbabazi 3/20 (4 overs)		Janet Mbabazi 34 (19); Aleena Khan 1/13 (1.4 overs)

Uganda won by 7 wickets
Gymkhana Club Ground, Nairobi
Umpires: Asgarali Kassam (Ken) and Nicholas Otieno (Ken)
Player of the match: Janet Mbabazi (Uga)

- Qatar won the toss and elected to bat.
- Devanandha Kavinisseri (Qat) made her WT20I debut.

19 December 2022
14:30
Scorecard

Tanzania; 131/7 (20 overs)	v	Kenya; 132/8 (18.4 overs)
Shufaa Mohamedi 36 (38); Mary Mwangi 2/15 (4 overs)		Veronica Abuga 56 (49); Perice Kamunya 3/16 (3.4 overs)

Kenya won by 3 wickets
Gymkhana Club Ground, Nairobi
Umpires: Charles Kariuki (Ken) and Nicholas Otieno (Ken)
Player of the match: Veronica Abuga (Ken)

- Tanzania won the toss and elected to bat.

== Third-place play-off ==
21 December 2022
10:30
Scorecard

Tanzania; 129/8 (20 overs)	v	Qatar; 101 (19.5 overs)
Fatuma Kibasu 30 (29); Aysha 3/26 (4 overs)		Aysha 36 (28); Josephine Ulrik 2/14 (4 overs)

Tanzania won by 28 runs
Gymkhana Club Ground, Nairobi
Umpires: David Odhiambo (Ken) and Nicholas Otieno (Ken)
Player of the match: Perice Kamunya (Tan)

- Tanzania won the toss and elected to bat.

== Final ==
21 December 2022
14:30
Scorecard

Kenya; 80 (18.2 overs)	v	Uganda; 81/4 (11.3 overs)
Daisy Njoroge 21 (17); Evelyn Anyipo 3/12 (3.2 overs)		Prosscovia Alako 30 (13); Mary Mwangi 3/15 (4 overs)

Uganda won by 6 wickets
Gymkhana Club Ground, Nairobi
Umpires: Lydiah Kaparo (Ken) and Isaac Oyieko (Ken)
Player of the match: Evelyn Anyipo (Uga)

- Kenya won the toss and elected to bat.
