= Chaya Mughal =

Indian-born Emirati cricketer (born 1986)

Personal information
- Full name: Chaya Mughal
- Born: 20 June 1986 (age 40); Srinagar, Jammu and Kashmir, India
- Batting: Right-handed
- Bowling: Right-arm medium
- Role: Batter

International information
- National side: United Arab Emirates (2018-2023)
- T20I debut (cap 1): 7 July 2018 v Netherlands
- Last T20I: 26 September 2023 v Namibia

Career statistics
Competition	WT20I
Matches	66
Runs scored	605
Batting average	13.15
100s/50s	0/1
Top score	52
Balls bowled	1,120
Wickets	46
Bowling average	18.30
5 wickets in innings	0
10 wickets in match	0
Best bowling	3/4
Catches/stumpings	19/4
- Source: ESPNcricinfo, 8 October 2024

Chaya Mughal (born 20 June 1986) is an Indian-born former cricketer who played for the United Arab Emirates national cricket team.

== Personal life ==
Mughal grew up in Srinagar, Jammu and Kashmir. She moved to the UAE in 2009 and is a schoolteacher by profession. As of January 2022 she taught at the Ambassador School in Dubai.

== Cricket career ==
Before moving to the UAE, Mughal represented Jammu and Kashmir state in Indian domestic cricket. In July 2018, she was named in the UAE squad for the 2018 ICC Women's World Twenty20 Qualifier tournament. She made her WT20I debut against Netherlands on 7 July 2018.

Mughal captained UAE at the 2021 ICC Women's T20 World Cup Asia Qualifier, with her team emerging undefeated to progress to the 2022 ICC Women's T20 World Cup Qualifier. She retained the captaincy for the qualifier which the UAE hosted in September 2022. In October 2022, she captained UAE team in Women's Twenty20 Asia Cup. In September 2023, it was announced that Mughal would retire from international cricket after captaining the UAE in the first match of a T20I series against Namibia.
