= Coast Cricket Association =

The Coast Cricket Association was the affiliate of Cricket Kenya responsible from cricket activities in the several counties formerly part of Coast Province in Kenya. It ran the Coast Cricket Association Leagues through which, together with those of the Rift Valley Cricket Association and Nairobi Province Cricket Association, used to be the basis of selecting the Kenya national cricket team. The Association had previously fielded a representative team. A Coast Cricket Association XI first appeared as a representative side in 1957 against Sunder Cricket Club, and it later played a first-class match in 1964 against Pakistan International Airlines at Mombasa Sports Club, with their only appearance in first-class cricket ending in an innings and 82 run defeat, with the Coast Cricket Association XI making 125 and 105 in its two innings. Since then the team has occasionally played minor matches, the last of which came in 2007 when it played Denmark. The association is also responsible for the Coast Pekee franchise in the East Africa Premier League and Cup competitions.

== Disolution and Replacement ==
Coast Province ceased to be an administrative entity with the adoption of the Constitution of Kenya 2010. The area formerly under Coast Province was subdvided into Mombasa, Kwale, Kilifi, Tana River, Taita Taveta, and Lamu Counties. Since the adoption of a new constitution in 2021, the Kilifi, Mombasa and Lamu County Cricket Associations the only County Associations, from the geographical area of the old Coast Province, to gain formal affiliation with Cricket Kenya

== Coast Cricket Association XI v Pakistan International Airlines ==
Coast Cricket Association XI
125 all out
&
105 all out
Pakistan International Airlines won by an innings and 82 runs

R. D. Patel 46
Afaq Hussain 5/18 (10.2 overs)

John Solanky 31
Afaq Hussain 3/16 (10 overs)

Mombasa Sports Club, Mombasa
Umpires: Not known

Pakistan International Airlines
290 all out

Shafqat Rana 130
Kishore Lalchani 3/45 (19.2 overs)
