= Kenya women's cricket team in Botswana in 2019–20 =

Kenyan women's cricket team in Botswana in 2019–20
	Botswana women	Kenya women
- Dates: 2 December – 7 December 2019
Captains	Goabilwe Matome	Daisy Njoroge

Twenty20 International series
- Results: Kenya women won the 7-match series 4–1
Most runs	Florence Samanyika (85)	Mary Mwangi (92)
Most wickets	Tuelo Shadrack (5)	Queentor Abel (7)

The Kenya women's cricket team toured Botswana in December 2019 to play a seven-match Women's Twenty20 International (WT20I) series. The venue for all of the matches was the Botswana Cricket Association Oval in Gaborone. Originally the tour was scheduled to be a tri-series, however Namibia withdrew prior to the series. Two T20Is each were scheduled for December 3 and December 5, though the first one on December 5 was rained off. The bilateral series was won 4–1 by Kenya, with two games abandoned due to rain.

== Squads ==
Botswana	Kenya
Goabilwe Matome (c); Botho Freeman; Banyana Gaanamong; Onneile Keitsemang; Bontle Madimabe (wk); Precious Modimo; Thapelo Modise; Amantle Mokgotlhe; Laura Mophakedi; Shameelah Mosweu; Botsogo Mpedi; Mimmie Ramafifi; Florence Samanyika; Tuelo Shadrack	Daisy Njoroge (c); Queentor Abel; Veronica Abuga; Lavendah Idambo; Sharon Juma (wk); Sylvia Kinyua; Faith Mutua; Mary Mwangi; Margaret Ngoche; Flavia Odhiambo; Venasa Ooko; Esther Wachira; Edith Waithaka; Sarah Wetoto

== WT20I series ==
=== 1st WT20I ===
2 December 2019
09:30
Scorecard

Botswana; 105/6 (20 overs)	v	Kenya; 108/2 (15.3 overs)
Thapelo Modise 47* (56); Daisy Njoroge 2/14 (4 overs)		Sylvia Kinyua 38* (42); Tuelo Shadrack 1/11 (3 overs)

Kenya won 8 wickets
Botswana Cricket Association Oval 1, Gaborone
Umpires: Justine Muzungu (Bot) and Reginald Nehonde (Bot)

- Kenya won the toss and elected to field.
- Botho Freeman (Bot), Flavia Odhiambo and Sarah Wetoto (Ken) all made their WT20I debuts.

=== 2nd WT20I ===
3 December 2019
09:30
Scorecard

Botswana; 61 (15.2 overs)	v	Kenya; 62/1 (9 overs)
Laura Mophakedi 15 (23); Queentor Abel 3/13 (4 overs)		Sharon Juma 31* (31); Tuelo Shadrack 1/23 (3 overs)

Kenya won by 9 wickets
Botswana Cricket Association Oval 1, Gaborone
Umpires: Logan Msemburi (Bot) and Imran Zakir (Bot)

- Kenya won the toss and elected to field.
- The match was originally scheduled to be played on 2 December but was moved to the following morning.
- Faith Mutua (Ken) made her WT20I debut.

=== 3rd WT20I ===
3 December 2019
14:30
Scorecard

Botswana; 107/8 (20 overs)	v	Kenya; 100/7 (20 overs)
Laura Mophakedi 34 (45); Edith Waithaka 3/20 (4 overs)		Sharon Juma 19 (22); Botsogo Mpedi 1/11 (2 overs)

Botswana won by 7 runs
Botswana Cricket Association Oval 1, Gaborone
Umpires: Wycliff Chimoga (Bot) and Logan Msemburi (Bot)
Player of the match: Laura Mophakedi (Bot)

- Botswana won the toss and elected to bat.

=== 4th WT20I ===
5 December 2019
09:30
Scorecard

Botswana	v	Kenya

Match abandoned
Botswana Cricket Association Oval 1, Gaborone
Umpires: Wycliff Chimoga (Bot) and Logan Msemburi (Bot)

- No toss.
- No play was possible due to rain.

=== 5th WT20I ===
5 December 2019
14:30
Scorecard

Kenya; 78/4 (13 overs)	v	Botswana; 67/5 (13 overs)
Sarah Wetoto 23 (15); Florence Samanyika 2/13 (3 overs)		Thapelo Modise 18 (28); Daisy Njoroge 1/16 (3 overs)

Kenya won by 11 runs
Botswana Cricket Association Oval 1, Gaborone
Umpires: Wycliff Chimoga (Bot) and Justine Muzungu (Bot)

- Kenya won the toss and elected to bat.
- The match was reduced to 13 overs per side due to rain.

=== 6th WT20I ===
6 December 2019
09:30
Scorecard

Kenya; 123/7 (20 overs)	v	Botswana; 73 (19.1 overs)
Mary Mwangi 26 (29); Mimmie Ramafifi 2/27 (4 overs)		Florence Samanyika 21 (35); Flavia Odhiambo 3/0 (1 over)

Kenya won by 50 runs
Botswana Cricket Association Oval 1, Gaborone
Umpires: Wycliff Chimoga (Bot) and Reginald Nehonde (Bot)
Player of the match: Flavia Odhiambo (Ken)

- Kenya won the toss and elected to bat.

=== 7th WT20I ===
7 December 2019
14:30
Scorecard

Botswana	v	Kenya

Match abandoned
Botswana Cricket Association Oval 1, Gaborone
Umpires: Justine Muzungu (Bot) and Reginald Nehonde (Bot)

- No toss.
- No play was possible due to rain.
