= Amit Shukla =

Kenyan cricketer (born 1985)

Personal information
- Full name: Amit Kandarp Shukla
- Born: 2 January 1985 (age 41); Nairobi, Kenya
- Batting: Right-handed
- Bowling: Right-arm medium-fast
- Role: Middle-order batsman

International information
- National side: Kenya
- Only ODI: 26 July 2011 v United Arab Emirates

Domestic team information
- Years: Team
- 2008–11: Southern Stars
- 2011–present: Kongonis

Career statistics
Competition	LA
Matches	1
Runs scored	–
Batting average	–
100s/50s	–/–
Top score	–
Balls bowled	18
Wickets	0
Bowling average	–
5 wickets in innings	–
10 wickets in match	–
Best bowling	0/17
Catches/stumpings	0/–
- Source: ESPNCricinfo

Amit Kandarp Shukla (born 2 January 1985) is a Kenyan cricketer. He represented Kenya in List A cricket in 2011.

He was a part of the Southern Stars squad in the Sahara Elite League, and now is a part of the Kongonis team that takes part in the revamped structure in the East African tournaments (East Africa Premier League and East Africa Cup). A number of good performances more or less brought him a call-up, but it was mostly due to the mass exodus of senior players, a number of them after refusing central contracts offered to them by the board. It was the squad to face the UAE in the second round of the 2011–13 ICC Intercontinental Cup and the 2011–13 ICC Intercontinental Cup One-Day, with the latter being significant as it served as qualification for the 2015 Cricket World Cup. He played just the one List A match against UAE, where he was not required to bat and conceded 17 runs off his three overs for no wicket. The opponent won the match by 4 wickets.
