= Mombasa County Cricket Association =

- Sport: Cricket
- Jurisdiction: Regional
- Affiliation: Cricket Kenya
- Affiliation date: 2025
- Regional affiliation: Mombasa
- (Kenya)

The Mombasa County Cricket Association is the regional cricket association responsible for administering cricketing programs in Mombasa County. It also sends voting delegates as a member of Cricket Kenya. The Association came into existence as the successor to the Coast Cricket Association, with he bulk of the CCA's active members being based in Mombasa County, such as the Mombasa Sports Club.
