= Kenya Kongonis Cricket Club =

Kenya Kongonis

Personnel
- One Day captain: Alton Rego
- Chairman: David Waters MBE

Team information
- Founded: 1927
- Home ground: Nairobi Club Ground, Nairobi
- Official website: Welcome to the Kenya Kongonis Cricket Club

The Kenya Kongonis Cricket Club also abbreviated as Kenya Kongonis, is a Kenyan domestic cricket club based in the Nairobi Club Ground, Nairobi. Founded in 1927, it is one of the oldest and most prestigious cricket clubs in Kenya. It takes part in the Nairobi-based NCCA (Nairobi County Cricket Association) Leagues and in the national cricket tournaments such as the East African tournaments, run by Cricket Kenya.

Kongonis is T20 franchise cricket team in the East Africa Premier League and East Africa Cup, tournaments started by Cricket Kenya. The team is based in Nairobi, Kenya and is operated by the Kenya Kongonis Cricket Club which is a member of the Nairobi Province Cricket Association.

== East African Tournaments Record ==
The Twenty20 competition of East Africa Premier League and the 50-over competition of the East Africa Cup was initiated by Cricket Kenya to raise the profile of the game and develop a grassroots structure that would consistently provide young talent to perform for the national team in international events. In the inaugural tournament, the 20-over competition were mostly dominated by the Ugandan teams invited to compete in the tournaments, but they dominated the 50-over competition, finishing top of the table, winning 6 games out of 10 matches, and is due to play the final against the against Nile Knights, one of two Ugandan teams along with Rwenzori Warriors to compete in the tournaments.

== History ==
The franchise was first formed when the East African competitions were formed in the wake of the 2011 World Cup disaster. Kongonis were one among the four Kenyan teams among those tournaments. Although they did not make much of an impression in the inaugural East African Premier League, dominated by the two Ugandan sides, they did dominate in the opening rounds. It was a different story in the 50-over counterpart, the East African Cup, though. They totally dominated the tournament, and except the occasional Ugandan good performance, nearly every franchise appeared minnows in front of them. They topped the group with 28 points from 10 games (6 wins and only two losses), and then won comprehensively in the twice-postponed final against Ugandan side Nile Knights (the other being Rwenzori Warriors) by 84 runs. After they posted a massive 280/5 (Rakep Patel 92, Duncan Allan 65), Pakistani-born Kenyan cricketer Abdul Rehman took 4-32 as their opponents could only manage 196/9.

== 2012 EAPL Squad ==
- (Kenya) Shem Obado (c)
- (Kenya) Alex Obanda
- (Kenya) Collins Obuya
- (Kenya) Emmanuel Bundi
- (Kenya) Elijah Otieno
- (Kenya) Ken Owino
- (Kenya) Amit Shukla
- (Kenya) William Rudd
- (Kenya) Eugene Maneno
- (Kenya) Pramveer Singh
- (Kenya) Henry Rudd
- (Kenya) Abdul Rehman
- (Kenya) Martin Mworia
- (Kenya) Nick Oluoch

The squad list is updated as of the 2012-13 East African Premier League.

== Notable players ==
Here is a list of Kongonis cricketers who have gone on to achieve something extraordinary or some other famous achievement.

- Maurice Walter and Philip Walter - A match-winning pair of cricketers who excelled in all departments of the game.
- Arthur H. Kneller - After playing 8 first class games for Hampshire, Arthur Kneller emigrated to Kenya through work. His subsequent batting feats make him a worthy inhabitant of the Hall of Fame. His record batting average for Gymkhana (Nairobi Club) of 97.86 (which included 5 centuries) has never been surpassed. He scored over 1000 runs in 1935/36. His first 3 innings were unbeaten centuries. 1941/2:He scored 1187 runs at an average of 69.82. 1942/3:He scored 1153 runs at an average 82.35. Also an outstanding wicketkeeper.
- Bill Rand-Overy - 1936 English tour; 414 runs at 46, 27 wickets at 10.51, 1935 to 1940:6 matches for Europeans v Asians topped batting averages with 357 runs at 39.66 and took 18 wickets at 17.00. 1938/9:Scored 1,013 runs at 53.31
- E.J. Boase - Cricket Coach at Prince of Wales School. 1945/6:Scored 1,200 runs at 46.0 and 160 wickets at 8.8
- D.W. Dawson - An iconic figure and brother of Ossie Dawson the SA cricketer. 1947/8:Scored 155n.o. KKCC v. Uganda Kobs. For the season scored 1174 runs and took 109 wickets at 10.77. 1948/9:Took 97 wickets at 10.2 and scored 884 runs at 36.8
- D.G. Hunter - 1947/8:Scored 2009 runs at 77.0 and took 103 wickets at 9.0
- R.W. Smith - He was a fine left arm bowler with plenty of pace and lift with an enviable easy action. On 2 UK tours, in 1947 and 1951, he took a remarkable 85 wickets at an impressive average of 6.16.

== Statistics ==
=== UK Averages ===
The Kongonis Cricket Club has toured the UK for many years. The statistics have been sourced from the official website, where the stats are given.

- Most Runs Scored - M. Brawn (5334)
- Most Wickets Taken - D. Breed (214)
- Record wicket partnerships - 240 (P Dunt 138, P Prodger 123*)
- Batting Averages (all Kongonis) - J. Abeed (25.13) Top allrounders-N Trestrail 4135 runs, 176 wkts.
- Bowling Averages (all Kongonis) - C. Acheson - 22.54

Statistics correct as of 1965-2010.

== Home ground ==
The Kongonis franchise's home ground is the Nairobi Club Ground at Nairobi. It is one of the oldest and one of the best cricket grounds in the country. It was one of the 2003 Cricket World Cup venues, which Kenya co-hosted alongside South Africa and Zimbabwe.
