= Peter Kituku =

Kenyan cricketer

Personal information
- Full name: Peter Kituku Musango
- Born: 18 April 1988 (age 38); Nairobi, Kenya
- Batting: Right-handed
- Role: Wicket-keeper

Career statistics
| Competition | Twenty20 |
|---|---|
| Matches | 3 |
| Runs scored | 32 |
| Batting average | 16.00 |
| 100s/50s | –/– |
| Top score | 31 |
| Catches/stumpings | –/– |
- Source: Cricinfo, 22 September 2021

Peter Kituku Musango (born 14 April 1988) is a Kenyan former cricketer.

Kituku was born at Nairobi in April 1988, where he was educated at Muranga Road Primary School. In Kenyan domestic cricket, Kituku played for the Southern Stars in the only edition of the Sahara Elite League in 2008. In club cricket he played for Kenya Kongonis Cricket Club. In November 2011, he toured Namibia with Kenya and played in three Twenty20 matches against the Namibia national cricket team at Windhoek, scoring 32 runs with a highest score of 31. He shared wicket-keeping duties during the series with Irfan Karim. Kituku began working for the East Africa Character Development Trust in 2014, where he coaches children from underprivileged backgrounds to become good characters and improve academically.
