= William Rudd (disambiguation) =

William Rudd may refer to:

- William Rudd (1880-1971), English cricketer
- Billy Rudd (Australian footballer) (1894-1961), Australian rules footballer
- Billy Rudd (born 1941), English footballer
