= Associate international cricket in 2021 =

International cricket season

The 2021 Associate international cricket season was from May to September 2021. All official twenty over matches between Associate members of the ICC were eligible to have full Twenty20 International (T20I) or Women's Twenty20 International (WT20I) status, as the International Cricket Council (ICC) granted T20I status to matches between all of its members from 1 July 2018 (women's teams) and 1 January 2019 (men's teams). The season included all T20I/WT20I cricket series mostly involving ICC Associate members, that were played in addition to series covered in International cricket in 2021. In July 2021, Mongolia and Tajikistan were awarded Associate Membership of the ICC, and Switzerland were also readmitted as associate members.

== Season overview ==
International tours
Start date	Home team	Away team	Results [Matches]
Start date	Home team	Away team	T20I
8 July 2021	Malta	Belgium	2–3 [5]
24 July 2021	Belgium	Austria	2–1 [3]
14 August 2021	Denmark	Sweden	2–1 [3]
18 August 2021	Rwanda	Ghana	2–3 [5]
21 August 2021	Finland	Sweden	2–2 [4]
10 September 2021	Spain	Germany	2–1 [3]
International tournaments
Start date	Tournament		Winners
21 May 2021	(Czech Republic) 2021 Central Europe Cup		Austria
24 June 2021	(Bulgaria) 2021 Sofia Twenty20		Romania
24 June 2021 (Note: The tournament was cancelled due to the COVID-19 pandemic.)	(Finland) 2021 ICC Men's T20 World Cup Europe Qualifier B		Cancelled
5 July 2021 (Note: The tournament was cancelled due to the COVID-19 pandemic.)	(Belgium) 2021 ICC Men's T20 World Cup Europe Qualifier C		Cancelled
8 July 2021 (Note: The tournament was cancelled due to the COVID-19 pandemic.)	(Finland) 2021 ICC Men's T20 World Cup Europe Qualifier A		Cancelled
17 July 2021 (Note: The tournament was postponed due to the COVID-19 pandemic.)	(Canada) 2021 ICC Men's T20 World Cup Americas Qualifier		Postponed
5 August 2021	2021 Germany Tri-Nation Series		Germany
12 August 2021 (Note: Matches played at the Baltic Cup were not given T20I status as only Estonia were members of the ICC.)	(Estonia) 2021 Baltic Cup		Estonia
19 August 2021	2021 Portugal Tri-Nation Series		Portugal
2 September 2021	(Romania) 2021 Continental Cup		Romania

Women's international tours
Start date	Home team	Away team	Results [Matches]
Start date	Home team	Away team	WT20I
8 July 2021	Germany	France	5–0 [5]
23 July 2021 (Note: The series was postponed due to the COVID-19 pandemic.)	Jersey	Guernsey	[3]
9 August 2021	Italy	Austria	2–3 [5]
29 August 2021 (Note: The teams contested a single official WT20I, which was the last of a three-match T20 series that was won 3–0 by Sweden.)	Sweden	Norway	1–0 [1]
Women's international tournaments
Start date	Tournament		Winners
6 June 2021	(Rwanda) 2021 Kwibuka Women's T20 Tournament		Kenya
26 August 2021	(Spain) 2021 ICC Women's T20 World Cup Europe Qualifier		Scotland

== May ==
=== 2021 Central Europe Cup ===
Team	P	W	L	T	NR	Pts	NRR
Austria	4	3	1	0	0	12	+1.370
Luxembourg	4	2	2	0	0	8	–0.015
Czech Republic	4	1	3	0	0	4	–1.151

T20I series
No.	Date	Team 1	Captain 1	Team 2	Captain 2	Venue	Result
T20I 1159	21 May	Czech Republic	Sudesh Wickramasekara	Luxembourg	Joost Mees	Vinoř Cricket Ground, Prague	Czech Republic by 9 wickets
T20I 1160	21 May	Austria	Razmal Shigiwal	Luxembourg	Joost Mees	Vinoř Cricket Ground, Prague	Austria by 5 runs (DLS)
T20I 1161	22 May	Czech Republic	Sudesh Wickramasekara	Austria	Razmal Shigiwal	Vinoř Cricket Ground, Prague	Austria by 78 runs
T20I 1162	22 May	Czech Republic	Sudesh Wickramasekara	Luxembourg	Joost Mees	Vinoř Cricket Ground, Prague	Luxembourg by 6 wickets
T20I 1163	23 May	Austria	Razmal Shigiwal	Luxembourg	Joost Mees	Vinoř Cricket Ground, Prague	Luxembourg by 5 wickets
T20I 1164	23 May	Czech Republic	Sudesh Wickramasekara	Austria	Razmal Shigiwal	Vinoř Cricket Ground, Prague	Austria by 4 wickets (DLS)

== June ==
=== 2021 Kwibuka Women's T20 Tournament ===
Teams	P	W	L	T	NR	Pts	NRR
Namibia	4	4	0	0	0	8	+2.662
Kenya	4	3	1	0	0	6	+0.957
Rwanda	4	2	2	0	0	4	+0.095
Nigeria	4	1	3	0	0	2	–0.993
Botswana	4	0	4	0	0	0	–3.249

Round-robin
No.	Date	Team 1	Captain 1	Team 2	Captain 2	Venue	Result
WT20I 896	6 June	Rwanda	Sarah Uwera	Botswana	Laura Mophakedi	Gahanga International Cricket Stadium, Kigali	Rwanda by 8 wickets
WT20I 897	6 June	Namibia	Irene van Zyl	Nigeria	Samantha Agazuma	Gahanga International Cricket Stadium, Kigali	Namibia by 8 wickets
WT20I 898	7 June	Botswana	Laura Mophakedi	Kenya	Margaret Ngoche	Gahanga International Cricket Stadium, Kigali	Kenya by 9 wickets
WT20I 899	7 June	Rwanda	Sarah Uwera	Namibia	Irene van Zyl	Gahanga International Cricket Stadium, Kigali	Namibia by 43 runs
WT20I 900	8 June	Kenya	Margaret Ngoche	Nigeria	Samantha Agazuma	Gahanga International Cricket Stadium, Kigali	Kenya by 8 wickets
WT20I 901	8 June	Botswana	Laura Mophakedi	Namibia	Irene van Zyl	Gahanga International Cricket Stadium, Kigali	Namibia by 65 runs
WT20I 902	9 June	Kenya	Margaret Ngoche	Namibia	Irene van Zyl	Gahanga International Cricket Stadium, Kigali	Namibia by 36 runs
WT20I 903	9 June	Rwanda	Sarah Uwera	Nigeria	Samantha Agazuma	Gahanga International Cricket Stadium, Kigali	Rwanda by 6 runs
WT20I 904	10 June	Rwanda	Sarah Uwera	Kenya	Margaret Ngoche	Gahanga International Cricket Stadium, Kigali	Kenya by 25 runs
WT20I 905	10 June	Botswana	Laura Mophakedi	Nigeria	Samantha Agazuma	Gahanga International Cricket Stadium, Kigali	Nigeria by 3 wickets
Play-offs
WT20I 906	11 June	Namibia	Irene van Zyl	Nigeria	Samantha Agazuma	Gahanga International Cricket Stadium, Kigali	Namibia by 91 runs
WT20I 907	11 June	Rwanda	Sarah Uwera	Kenya	Margaret Ngoche	Gahanga International Cricket Stadium, Kigali	Kenya by 52 runs
WT20I 908	12 June	Rwanda	Sarah Uwera	Nigeria	Agatha Obulor	Gahanga International Cricket Stadium, Kigali	Rwanda by 8 runs
WT20I 909	12 June	Kenya	Margaret Ngoche	Namibia	Irene van Zyl	Gahanga International Cricket Stadium, Kigali	Kenya by 7 wickets

=== 2021 Sofia Twenty20 Series ===
Teams	P	W	L	T	NR	Pts	NRR
Romania	3	3	0	0	0	6	+4.011
Bulgaria	3	2	1	0	0	4	+1.200
Greece	3	1	2	0	0	2	–1.445
Serbia	3	0	3	0	0	0	–3.502

Round-robin
No.	Date	Team 1	Captain 1	Team 2	Captain 2	Venue	Result
T20I 1166	24 June	Bulgaria	Prakash Mishra	Serbia	Aleksa Djorovic	National Sports Academy, Sofia	Bulgaria by 61 runs
T20I 1167	24 June	Greece	Anastasios Manousis	Romania	Ramesh Satheesan	National Sports Academy, Sofia	Romania by 3 wickets
T20I 1169	25 June	Greece	Anastasios Manousis	Serbia	Aleksa Djorovic	National Sports Academy, Sofia	Greece by 5 wickets
T20I 1170	25 June	Bulgaria	Prakash Mishra	Romania	Ramesh Satheesan	National Sports Academy, Sofia	Romania by 7 wickets
T20I 1171	25 June	Romania	Ramesh Satheesan	Serbia	Aleksa Djorovic	National Sports Academy, Sofia	Romania by 91 runs
T20I 1172	26 June	Bulgaria	Prakash Mishra	Greece	Anastasios Manousis	National Sports Academy, Sofia	Bulgaria by 64 runs
Play-offs
T20I 1173	26 June	Romania	Ramesh Satheesan	Serbia	Aleksa Djorovic	National Sports Academy, Sofia	Romania by 10 wickets
T20I 1175	26 June	Bulgaria	Prakash Mishra	Greece	Anastasios Manousis	National Sports Academy, Sofia	No result
T20I 1177	27 June	Bulgaria	Prakash Mishra	Romania	Ramesh Satheesan	National Sports Academy, Sofia	Romania by 7 wickets

=== 2021 ICC T20 World Cup Europe Qualifier B ===
The tournament was cancelled due to COVID-19 pandemic.

== July ==
=== 2021 ICC T20 World Cup Europe Qualifier C ===
The tournament was cancelled due to COVID-19 pandemic.

=== 2021 ICC T20 World Cup Europe Qualifier A ===
The tournament was cancelled due to COVID-19 pandemic.

=== Belgium in Malta ===
WT20I series
No.	Date	Home captain	Away captain	Venue	Result
T20I 1182	8 July	Bikram Arora	Shaheryar Butt	Marsa Sports Club, Marsa	Malta by 6 wickets
T20I 1183	8 July	Bikram Arora	Shaheryar Butt	Marsa Sports Club, Marsa	Belgium by 10 wickets
T20I 1184	9 July	Bikram Arora	Shaheryar Butt	Marsa Sports Club, Marsa	Belgium by 4 wickets
T20I 1186	10 July	Bikram Arora	Shaheryar Butt	Marsa Sports Club, Marsa	Malta by penalty runs
T20I 1187	10 July	Bikram Arora	Nemish Mehta	Marsa Sports Club, Marsa	Belgium by 39 runs

=== France women in Germany ===
WT20I series
No.	Date	Home captain	Away captain	Venue	Result
WT20I 913	8 July	Anuradha Doddaballapur	Emmanuelle Brelivet	Bayer Uerdingen Cricket Ground, Krefeld	Germany by 9 wickets
WT20I 914	8 July	Anuradha Doddaballapur	Emmanuelle Brelivet	Bayer Uerdingen Cricket Ground, Krefeld	Germany by 8 wickets
WT20I 915	9 July	Anuradha Doddaballapur	Emmanuelle Brelivet	Bayer Uerdingen Cricket Ground, Krefeld	Germany by 65 runs
WT20I 917	10 July	Anuradha Doddaballapur	Emmanuelle Brelivet	Bayer Uerdingen Cricket Ground, Krefeld	Germany by 9 wickets
WT20I 918	10 July	Anuradha Doddaballapur	Emmanuelle Brelivet	Bayer Uerdingen Cricket Ground, Krefeld	Germany by 34 runs

=== Guernsey women in Jersey ===
The series was postponed due to the COVID-19 pandemic.

Inter-Insular WT20I series
No.	Date	Home captain	Away captain	Venue	Result
[1st WT20I]	23 July			Farmers' Field, Saint Martin	
[2nd WT20I]	24 July			Farmers' Field, Saint Martin	
[3rd WT20I]	25 July			Farmers' Field, Saint Martin	

=== Austria in Belgium ===
T20I series
No.	Date	Home captain	Away captain	Venue	Result
T20I 1199	24 July	Sheraz Sheikh	Razmal Shigiwal	Royal Brussels Cricket Club, Waterloo	Belgium by 7 wickets
T20I 1200	24 July	Sheraz Sheikh	Razmal Shigiwal	Royal Brussels Cricket Club, Waterloo	Belgium by 12 runs (DLS)
T20I 1202	25 July	Sheraz Sheikh	Razmal Shigiwal	Royal Brussels Cricket Club, Waterloo	Austria by 6 wickets

=== 2021 ICC T20 World Cup Americas Qualifier ===
The tournament was postponed due to COVID-19 pandemic.

== August ==
=== 2021 Germany Tri-Nation Series ===
Teams	P	W	L	T	NR	Pts	NRR
Germany	4	3	1	0	0	6	+0.809
Norway	4	2	2	0	0	4	+0.365
France	4	1	3	0	0	2	–1.161

Round-robin
No.	Date	Team 1	Captain 1	Team 2	Captain 2	Venue	Result
T20I 1213	5 August	Germany	Venkatraman Ganesan	Norway	Raza Iqbal	Bayer Uerdingen Cricket Ground, Krefeld	Germany by 5 wickets
T20I 1214	5 August	France	Usman Shahid	Norway	Raza Iqbal	Bayer Uerdingen Cricket Ground, Krefeld	France by 4 wickets
T20I 1215	6 August	Germany	Venkatraman Ganesan	France	Usman Shahid	Bayer Uerdingen Cricket Ground, Krefeld	Germany by 2 wickets (DLS)
T20I 1217	7 August	Germany	Venkatraman Ganesan	France	Usman Shahid	Bayer Uerdingen Cricket Ground, Krefeld	Germany by 48 runs
T20I 1219	7 August	France	Usman Shahid	Norway	Raza Iqbal	Bayer Uerdingen Cricket Ground, Krefeld	Norway by 3 runs
T20I 1220	8 August	Germany	Venkatraman Ganesan	Norway	Raza Iqbal	Bayer Uerdingen Cricket Ground, Krefeld	Norway by 51 runs
Final
T20I 1221	8 August	Germany	Venkatraman Ganesan	Norway	Raza Iqbal	Bayer Uerdingen Cricket Ground, Krefeld	Germany by 6 wickets (DLS)

=== Austria women in Italy ===
WT20I series
No.	Date	Home captain	Away captain	Venue	Result
WT20I 924	9 August	Kumudu Peddrick	Gandhali Bapat	Roma Cricket Ground, Rome	Italy by 8 wickets
WT20I 925	10 August	Kumudu Peddrick	Gandhali Bapat	Roma Cricket Ground, Rome	Austria by 7 wickets
WT20I 926	11 August	Kumudu Peddrick	Gandhali Bapat	Roma Cricket Ground, Rome	Austria by 7 runs
WT20I 927	11 August	Kumudu Peddrick	Gandhali Bapat	Roma Cricket Ground, Rome	Austria by 6 wickets
WT20I 928	12 August	Kumudu Peddrick	Gandhali Bapat	Roma Cricket Ground, Rome	Italy by 1 run

=== 2021 Baltic Cup ===
Matches played at the Baltic Cup did not have T20I status as only Estonia were members of the ICC.

Teams	P	W	L	T	NR	Pts	NRR
Estonia	3	3	0	0	0	6	+3.054
Latvia	3	2	1	0	0	4	+1.470
Estonia 'A'	3	1	2	0	0	2	+0.601
Lithuania	3	0	3	0	0	0	–5.287

Round-robin
No.	Date	Team 1	Captain 1	Team 2	Captain 2	Venue	Result
1st Match	12 August	Estonia	Marko Vaik	Lithuania	Neeraj Madhivannan	National Cricket Field 1, Tallinn	Estonia by 143 runs
2nd Match	12 August	Estonia 'A'	Bejon Sarker	Latvia	Biswajit Mohapathra	National Cricket Field 2, Tallinn	Latvia by 4 wickets
3rd Match	13 August	Estonia	Marko Vaik	Estonia 'A'	Tim Cross	National Cricket Field 1, Tallinn	Estonia by 7 wickets
4th Match	13 August	Latvia	Mehdi Faraaz Abbas	Lithuania	Neeraj Madhivannan	National Cricket Field 2, Tallinn	Latvia by 89 runs
5th Match	13 August	Estonia	Marko Vaik	Latvia	Mehdi Faraaz Abbas	National Cricket Field 1, Tallinn	Estonia by 12 runs
6th Match	13 August	Estonia 'A'	Tim Cross	Lithuania	Neeraj Madhivannan	National Cricket Field 2, Tallinn	Estonia 'A' by 8 wickets

=== Sweden in Denmark ===
T20I series
No.	Date	Home captain	Away captain	Venue	Result
T20I 1223	14 August	Frederik Klokker	Abhijit Venkatesh	Svanholm Park, Brøndby	Denmark by 8 runs
T20I 1224	14 August	Frederik Klokker	Abhijit Venkatesh	Svanholm Park, Brøndby	Sweden by 3 wickets
T20I 1225	15 August	Frederik Klokker	Abhijit Venkatesh	Svanholm Park, Brøndby	Denmark by 6 wickets

=== Ghana in Rwanda ===
T20I series
No.	Date	Home captain	Away captain	Venue	Result
T20I 1226	18 August	Clinton Rubagumya	Obed Harvey	Gahanga International Cricket Stadium, Kigali	Rwanda by 1 wicket
T20I 1227	18 August	Clinton Rubagumya	Obed Harvey	Gahanga International Cricket Stadium, Kigali	Ghana by 2 wickets
T20I 1229	20 August	Clinton Rubagumya	Obed Harvey	Gahanga International Cricket Stadium, Kigali	Rwanda by 57 runs
T20I 1231	20 August	Clinton Rubagumya	Obed Harvey	Gahanga International Cricket Stadium, Kigali	Ghana by concession
T20I 1234	21 August	Clinton Rubagumya	Obed Harvey	Gahanga International Cricket Stadium, Kigali	Ghana by 7 wickets

=== 2021 Portugal Tri-Nation Series ===
Teams	P	W	L	T	NR	Pts	NRR
Portugal	4	4	0	0	0	8	+3.110
Malta	4	2	2	0	0	4	–0.159
Gibraltar	4	0	4	0	0	0	–2.952

Round-robin
No.	Date	Team 1	Captain 1	Team 2	Captain 2	Venue	Result
T20I 1228	19 August	Portugal	Najjam Shahzad	Malta	Bikram Arora	Gucherre Cricket Ground, Albergaria	Portugal by 6 wickets
T20I 1230	20 August	Gibraltar	Edmund Packard	Malta	Bikram Arora	Gucherre Cricket Ground, Albergaria	Malta by 8 wickets
T20I 1233	21 August	Portugal	Najjam Shahzad	Gibraltar	Edmund Packard	Gucherre Cricket Ground, Albergaria	Portugal by 96 runs
T20I 1236	21 August	Gibraltar	Edmund Packard	Malta	Bikram Arora	Gucherre Cricket Ground, Albergaria	Malta by 4 runs
T20I 1238	22 August	Portugal	Najjam Shahzad	Gibraltar	Edmund Packard	Gucherre Cricket Ground, Albergaria	Portugal by 110 runs
T20I 1240	22 August	Portugal	Najjam Shahzad	Malta	Bikram Arora	Gucherre Cricket Ground, Albergaria	Portugal by 3 wickets

=== Sweden in Finland ===
T20I series
No.	Date	Home captain	Away captain	Venue	Result
T20I 1232	21 August	Nathan Collins	Abhijit Venkatesh	Kerava National Cricket Ground, Kerava	Finland by 4 wickets
T20I 1235	21 August	Nathan Collins	Abhijit Venkatesh	Kerava National Cricket Ground, Kerava	Finland by 4 wickets
T20I 1237	22 August	Nathan Collins	Abhijit Venkatesh	Kerava National Cricket Ground, Kerava	Sweden by 3 wickets (DLS)
T20I 1239	22 August	Nathan Collins	Abhijit Venkatesh	Kerava National Cricket Ground, Kerava	Sweden by 6 wickets

=== 2021 ICC Women's T20 World Cup Europe Qualifier ===
Pos	Team	Pld	W	L	NR	Pts	NRR
1	Scotland	4	4	0	0	8	2.842
2	Ireland	4	3	1	0	6	3.743
3	Netherlands	4	2	2	0	4	0.870
4	Germany	4	1	3	0	2	−3.188
5	France	4	0	4	0	0	−5.647

Updated to match(es) played on 30 August 2021. Source: ESPN Cricinfo

advances to global qualifier

Round-robin
No.	Date	Team 1	Captain 1	Team 2	Captain 2	Venue	Result
WT20I 929	26 August	Netherlands	Heather Siegers	Scotland	Kathryn Bryce	La Manga Club (Top Ground), Cartagena	Scotland by 6 wickets
WT20I 930	26 August	Germany	Anuradha Doddaballapur	Ireland	Laura Delany	La Manga Club (Bottom Ground), Cartagena	Ireland by 164 runs
WT20I 931	26 August	France	Emmanuelle Brelivet	Netherlands	Heather Siegers	La Manga Club (Top Ground), Cartagena	Netherlands by 9 wickets
WT20I 932	27 August	France	Emmanuelle Brelivet	Germany	Anuradha Doddaballapur	La Manga Club (Bottom Ground), Cartagena	Germany by 9 wickets
WT20I 933	27 August	Ireland	Laura Delany	Scotland	Kathryn Bryce	La Manga Club (Top Ground), Cartagena	Scotland by 5 wickets
WT20I 935	27 August	Germany	Anuradha Doddaballapur	Netherlands	Heather Siegers	La Manga Club (Bottom Ground), Cartagena	Netherlands by 7 wickets
WT20I 937	29 August	Germany	Anuradha Doddaballapur	Scotland	Kathryn Bryce	La Manga Club (Top Ground), Cartagena	Scotland by 10 wickets
WT20I 938	29 August	France	Emmanuelle Brelivet	Ireland	Laura Delany	La Manga Club (Bottom Ground), Cartagena	Ireland by 10 wickets
WT20I 940	30 August	Ireland	Laura Delany	Netherlands	Heather Siegers	La Manga Club (Top Ground), Cartagena	Ireland by 24 runs
WT20I 941	30 August	France	Emmanuelle Brelivet	Scotland	Kathryn Bryce	La Manga Club (Bottom Ground), Cartagena	Scotland by 7 wickets

=== Norway women in Sweden ===
WT20I match
No.	Date	Home captain	Away captain	Venue	Result
WT20I 939	29 August	Gunjan Shukla	Pooja Kumari	Guttsta Wicked Cricket Ground, Kolsva	Sweden by 2 wickets

== September ==
=== 2021 Continental Cup ===
Teams	P	W	L	T	NR	Pts	NRR
Luxembourg	2	2	0	0	0	4	+1.692
Malta	2	1	1	0	0	0	+1.484
Bulgaria	2	0	2	0	0	0	–3.549

Teams	P	W	L	T	NR	Pts	NRR
Romania	2	2	0	0	0	4	+1.075
Hungary	2	1	1	0	0	2	–0.075
Czech Republic	2	0	2	0	0	0	–1.000

Group stage
No.	Date	Team 1	Captain 1	Team 2	Captain 2	Venue	Result
T20I 1245	2 September	Bulgaria	Prakash Mishra	Luxembourg	Joost Mees	Moara Vlasiei Cricket Ground, Ilfov County	Luxembourg by 62 runs
T20I 1246	2 September	Czech Republic	Arun Ashokan	Hungary	Abhijeet Ahuja	Moara Vlasiei Cricket Ground, Ilfov County	Hungary by 5 runs
T20I 1247	2 September	Luxembourg	Joost Mees	Malta	Amar Sharma	Moara Vlasiei Cricket Ground, Ilfov County	Luxembourg by 4 wickets
T20I 1249	3 September	Romania	Ramesh Satheesan	Czech Republic	Arun Ashokan	Moara Vlasiei Cricket Ground, Ilfov County	Romania by 35 runs
T20I 1250	3 September	Bulgaria	Prakash Mishra	Malta	Bikram Arora	Moara Vlasiei Cricket Ground, Ilfov County	Malta by 7 wickets
T20I 1252	3 September	Romania	Ramesh Satheesan	Hungary	Abhijeet Ahuja	Moara Vlasiei Cricket Ground, Ilfov County	Romania by 8 runs
Play-offs
T20I 1253	4 September	Bulgaria	Prakash Mishra	Czech Republic	Arun Ashokan	Moara Vlasiei Cricket Ground, Ilfov County	Czech Republic by 7 wickets
T20I 1254	4 September	Luxembourg	Joost Mees	Hungary	Abhijeet Ahuja	Moara Vlasiei Cricket Ground, Ilfov County	Luxembourg by 2 runs
T20I 1255	4 September	Romania	Ramesh Satheesan	Malta	Bikram Arora	Moara Vlasiei Cricket Ground, Ilfov County	Romania by 36 runs
T20I 1257	5 September	Romania	Ramesh Satheesan	Luxembourg	Joost Mees	Moara Vlasiei Cricket Ground, Ilfov County	Romania by 33 runs
T20I 1259	5 September	Hungary	Abhijeet Ahuja	Malta	Bikram Arora	Moara Vlasiei Cricket Ground, Ilfov County	Hungary by 8 wickets

=== Germany in Spain ===
T20I series
No.	Date	Home captain	Away captain	Venue	Result
T20I 1262	10 September	Christian Munoz-Mills	Venkatraman Ganesan	Desert Springs Cricket Ground, Almería	Germany by 7 wickets
T20I 1266	11 September	Christian Munoz-Mills	Venkatraman Ganesan	Desert Springs Cricket Ground, Almería	Spain by 5 wickets
T20I 1268	11 September	Christian Munoz-Mills	Venkatraman Ganesan	Desert Springs Cricket Ground, Almería	Spain by 1 wicket

== See also ==
- International cricket in 2021
- Impact of the COVID-19 pandemic on cricket
