= Kenya women's national cricket team =

Cricket team

Kenya
- Association: Cricket Kenya

Personnel
- Captain: Esther Wachira
- Coach: Lameck Ngoche

International Cricket Council
- ICC status: Associate member (1981)
- ICC region: Africa
ICC Rankings	Current	Best-ever
T20I	28th	16th (11 Oct 2018)

International cricket
- First international: v Uganda; 26 January 2001

T20 Internationals
- First T20I: v Zimbabwe at Lugogo Stadium, Kampala; 6 April 2019
- Last T20I: v Rwanda at High Performance Oval, Windhoek; 6 September 2025
T20Is	Played	Won/Lost
Total	81	38/42 (1 tie, 0 no results)
This year	0	0/0 (0 ties, 0 no results)
T20I kit
- As of 6 September 2025

The Kenya national women's cricket team represents Kenya in international women's cricket. Their first matches were in January 2001 when they played a three-match series against Uganda.

== History ==
Kenya played in the African regional qualifiers for the 2009 World Cup in December 2006 against Tanzania, Uganda and Zimbabwe. They performed poorly in the tournament, finishing in last place.

In 2008, Sarah Bhakita scored an unbeaten 186 against Rwanda to become the second woman in the world to achieve the feat in an international match. The team also participated in the World Cup Qualifiers held in Nairobi in December 2010, missing an opportunity to represent the continent by negligible scores, having tied with Zimbabwe at second place. South Africa who won all their matches and Zimbabwe achieved that feat instead.

In December 2009, they won the Africa Women Championships under the captainship of Emily Ruto.

In December 2011, the women' team represented the country in Kampala, Uganda at the annual Africa Cricket Championships finishing fourth after the winners Uganda, Tanzania and Namibia. the other participating countries were Nigeria and Sierra Leone.

In April 2016, the team played in 2016 ICC Africa Women's World Twenty20 to qualify for 2018 ICC Women's World Twenty20 in the West Indies.

In April 2018, the International Cricket Council (ICC) granted full Women's Twenty20 International (WT20I) status to all its members. Therefore, all Twenty20 matches played between Kenya women and another international side after 1 July 2018 will be a full WT20I. Kenya made its Twenty20 International debut on 6 April 2019 against Zimbabwe during the 2019 Victoria Tri-Series in Kampala, Uganda.

== Current squad ==
Updated on 17 June 2024.

This lists all the players who played for Kenya in the past 12 months or were named in the most recent squad.

Name	Age	Batting style	Bowling style	Notes
Batters
Venasa Ooko	28	Right-handed	Right-arm medium	
Veronica Abuga	24	Right-handed	Right-arm off break	
Mercy Sifuna	24	Right-handed	Right-arm medium	
Marion Juma	22	Right-handed	Right-arm medium	
All-rounders
Esther Wachira	27	Right-handed	Right-arm medium	Captain
Queentor Abel	28	Right-handed	Right-arm off break	
Mary Mwangi	31	Right-handed	Right-arm medium	
Kelvia Ogola	24	Right-handed	Right-arm medium	
Wicket-keepers
Charity Muthoni	26	Right-handed		
Spin Bowler
Melvin Khagisota	20	Right-handed	Right-arm off break	Vice-captain
Judith Ajiambo	26	Right-handed	Right-arm off break	
Edith Waithaka	26	Right-handed	Slow left-arm orthodox	
Pace Bowlers
Lavendah Idambo	21	Right-handed	Right-arm medium	
Flavia Odhiambo	24	Right-handed	Right-arm medium	
Jemimah Ndanu	22	Right-handed	Right-arm medium	
Ann Wanjira	23	Right-handed	Right-arm medium	

== Records and statistics ==
International Match Summary — Kenya Women

Last updated 6 September 2025

Playing Record
Format	M	W	L	T	NR	Inaugural Match
Twenty20 Internationals	81	38	42	1	0	6 April 2019

=== Twenty20 International ===
- Highest team total: 234/1 v Lesotho, 5 September 2023, at Botswana Cricket Association Oval 2, Gaborone
- Highest individual score: 109, Queentor Abel v Lesotho, 5 September 2023, at Botswana Cricket Association Oval 2, Gaborone
- Best individual bowling figures: 6/16, Sarah Wetoto v Namibia, 12 June 2021, at Gahanga International Cricket Stadium, Kigali

Most T20I runs for Kenya Women

Player	Runs	Average	Career span
Queentor Abel	1,537	26.50	2019–2025
Venasa Ooko	781	16.61	2019–2025
Esther Wachira	641	13.08	2019–2025
Veronica Abuga	528	13.53	2019–2025
Sharon Juma	422	14.06	2019–2023

Most T20I wickets for Kenya Women

Player	Wickets	Average	Career span
Queentor Abel	94	11.30	2019–2025
Esther Wachira	70	14.32	2019–2025
Lavendah Idambo	58	15.74	2019–2025
Melvin Khagoitsa	52	13.73	2021–2025
Flavia Odhiambo	50	12.84	2019–2024

WT20I record versus other nations

Records complete to WT20I #2487. Last updated 6 September 2025.

Opponent	M	W	L	T	NR	First Match	First Win
ICC Full members
Bangladesh	1	0	1	0	0	19 January 2021	
Sri Lanka	1	0	1	0	0	20 January 2021	
Zimbabwe	3	0	3	0	0	6 April 2019	
ICC Associate members
Botswana	14	12	1	1	0	2 December 2019	2 December 2019
Brazil	1	1	0	0	0	15 June 2022	15 June 2022
Cameroon	2	2	0	0	0	6 September 2023	6 September 2023
Germany	1	1	0	0	0	16 June 2022	16 June 2022
Lesotho	1	1	0	0	0	5 September 2023	5 September 2023
Malawi	2	2	0	0	0	3 September 2023	3 September 2023
Malaysia	1	0	1	0	0	23 January 2022	
Namibia	3	1	2	0	0	5 May 2019	12 June 2021
Nigeria	7	5	2	0	0	8 June 2021	8 June 2021
Qatar	2	2	0	0	0	15 December 2022	15 December 2022
Rwanda	20	7	13	0	0	10 June 2021	10 June 2021
Scotland	1	0	1	0	0	22 January 2022	
Sierra Leone	1	1	0	0	0	6 May 2019	6 May 2019
Tanzania	7	2	5	0	0	12 June 2022	13 December 2022
Uganda	12	1	11	0	0	6 April 2019	10 June 2022
United Arab Emirates	1	0	1	0	0	18 April 2023	

== Tournament history ==
=== Women's ODI World Cup ===
Women's Cricket World Cup records
Host Year	Round	Position	GP	W	L	T	NR
(England) 1973	Did not qualify/No Women's ODI status						
(India) 1978	Did not qualify/No Women's ODI status						
(New Zealand) 1982	Did not qualify/No Women's ODI status						
(Australia) 1988	Did not qualify/No Women's ODI status						
(England) 1993	Did not qualify/No Women's ODI status						
(India) 1997	Did not qualify/No Women's ODI status						
(New Zealand) 2000	Did not qualify/No Women's ODI status						
(South Africa) 2005	Did not qualify/No Women's ODI status						
(Australia) 2009	Did not qualify/No Women's ODI status						
(India) 2013	Did not qualify/No Women's ODI status						
(England) 2017	Did not qualify/No Women's ODI status						
(New Zealand) 2022	Did not qualify/No Women's ODI status						
(India) 2025	Did not qualify/No Women's ODI status						
Total	0/13	0 Titles	0	0	0	0	0

=== Women's World T20 ===
Twenty20 World Cup records
Host Year	Round	Position	GP	W	L	T	NR
(England) 2009	Did not qualify						
(Cricket West Indies) 2010	Did not qualify						
(Sri Lanka) 2012	Did not qualify						
(Bangladesh) 2014	Did not qualify						
(India) 2016	Did not qualify						
(Cricket West Indies) 2018	Did not qualify						
(Australia) 2020	Did not qualify						
(South Africa) 2023	Did not qualify						
(United Arab Emirates) 2024	Did not qualify						
(England) 2026	To be determined						
Total	0/9	0 Titles	0	0	0	0	0

=== ICC Women's T20 Champions Trophy ===
ICC Women's T20 Champions Trophy records
Host Year	Round	Position	GP	W	L	T	NR
(Sri Lanka) 2027	To be determined						
2031	To be determined						
Total	–	0 Title	0	0	0	0	0

=== Cricket at Summer Olympics Games ===
Cricket at Summer Olympics records
Host Year	Round	Position	GP	W	L	T	NR
(United States) 2028	To be determined						
(Australia) 2032	To be determined						
Total	–	0 Title	0	0	0	0	0

=== ICC Women's T20 World Cup Africa Qualifier ===
ICC Women's T20 World Cup Africa Qualifier records
Year	Round	Position	GP	W	L	T	NR
(Zimbabwe) 2019	Group stages	–	3	1	2	0	0
(Botswana) 2021	Did not participate						
Total	1/2	–	3	1	2	0	0

=== ICC Women's T20 World Cup Africa Qualifier Division One ===
ICC Women's T20 World Cup Africa Qualifier Division Two records
Year	Round	Position	GP	W	L	T	NR
(Uganda) 2023	Group stage	–	3	1	2	0	0
(Namibia) 2025	DNQ	6/8	5	1	4	0	0
Total	2/2	0 Title	8	2	6	0	0

=== ICC Women's T20 World Cup Africa Qualifier Division Two ===
ICC Women's T20 World Cup Africa Qualifier Division Two records
Year	Round	Position	GP	W	L	T	NR
(Botswana) 2023	Champion	–	5	5	0	0	0
Total	1/1	1 Title	5	5	0	0	0

== See also ==
- List of Kenya women Twenty20 International cricketers
