= Kishore Lalchani =

Kenyan cricketer

Personal information
- Full name: Kishore Lalchani
- Born: Uganda Protectorate
- Batting: Unknown
- Bowling: Unknown

Career statistics
Competition	First-class
Matches	1
Runs scored	16
Batting average	8.00
100s/50s	–/–
Top score	9
Balls bowled	116
Wickets	3
Bowling average	15.00
5 wickets in innings	–
10 wickets in match	–
Best bowling	3/45
Catches/stumpings	–/–
- Source: Cricinfo, 21 September 2021

Kishore Lalchani (date of birth unknown) was a Ugandan-born Kenyan first-class cricketer.

A cricketer in Mombasa, he made a single appearance in first-class cricket for the Coast Cricket Association against a touring Pakistan International Airlines cricket team at Mombasa in 1964. Batting twice in the match, he was dismissed for 7 runs in the Coast Cricket Association first innings by Afaq Hussain, while in their second innings he was dismissed for 9 runs by Intikhab Alam. In Pakistan International Airlines only innings, he took the wickets of Abdur Rasheed, Asif Iqbal and Afaq Hussain for the cost of 45 runs.
