= Queentor Abel =

Kenyan cricketer (born 1997)

Personal information
- Full name: Queentor Abel
- Born: 6 October 1997 (age 29)
- Batting: Right-handed
- Bowling: Right-arm offbreak

International information
- National side: Kenya
- T20I debut (cap 1): 6 April 2019 v Zimbabwe
- Last T20I: 30 October 2024 v Rwanda

Career statistics
Competition	WT20I
Matches	59
Runs scored	1,366
Batting average	26.78
100s/50s	1/6
Top score	109
Balls bowled	1,179
Wickets	84
Bowling average	10.92
5 wickets in innings	2
10 wickets in match	0
Best bowling	5/5
Catches/stumpings	36/0
- Source: Cricinfo, 30 October 2024

Queentor Abel (born 6 October 1997) is a Kenyan cricketer and the current captain of the women's national cricket team. An all-rounder, Abel bats right-handed and is a right-arm offbreak bowler.

== Domestic career ==
=== Uganda ===
Since 2017, Abel has been playing for the Pioneer team in the women's domestic competition staged by the Uganda Cricket Association. In the first of those years, she was named as MVP in the competition, after scoring 239 runs and taking seven wickets in just five of her team's ten matches. In the final of the following year's competition, she made 33* and took 2/30, but her team was still defeated by Olila High by five wickets.

In March 2022, Abel had another busy day while playing back-to-back matches for Pioneer against Olila at Entebbe. In the first match, she scored 44 and took 5/17, and in the second she took a further four wickets. Pioneer won both matches.

=== Kenya ===
From July to September 2021, Abel captained the Nelion Knights team in the Kenya Ladies’ Nairobi Province Cricket Association (NPCA) League.

As of June 2022, Kenya did not have a national women's domestic league competition, although there had been talks about setting one up.

== International career ==
=== 2014–18: Early days ===
In December 2014, Abel played for Kenya in the ICC Africa Women's T20 Championship in Benoni, Gauteng, South Africa. She batted in three matches, but did not reach double figures, and did not bowl. In June 2015, she was part of the first Kenyan team to participate in the Kwibuka Women's T20 Tournament in Kigali, Rwanda. Kenya recorded its first Kwibuka tournament win that year; Abel's best performance was 46* on 13 June 2015 against Rwanda. In April 2016, she played in the ICC Women's Qualifier Africa, but her top score was only 10 runs against Uganda, and again she did not bowl.

Abel next took the field for Kenya in her second Kwibuka T20 Tournament in June 2017. Once again Kenya emerged as the winner; Abel's best performance was 40 runs in 35 balls and 3/8 against Rwanda on 10 June 2017. Three months later, in the round robin stage of the ICC Women's T20 World Cup Africa Qualifier in Windhoek, Namibia, Abel top scored for her team with 24 runs in 23 balls, and took 2/14, in Kenya's loss to Uganda. Then, in the playoff against Uganda, she top scored for the match with 36*, but that did not stop Uganda from winning by five wickets, in a cliffhanger with just one ball to spare.

The following year, 2018, Kenya won the Kwibuka T20 Tournament for a third time, and Abel played an even more prominent role; she took 2/20 and made 37* against Uganda U19, was the stand-in captain in both of her team's matches against Rwanda, and then took 3/13 in the team's second match against Uganda U-19.

=== 2019–present: WT20I era ===
On 6 April 2019, Abel made her Women's Twenty20 International (WT20I) debut for Kenya against Zimbabwe, in the first match of a Victoria Tri-Series in Kampala, Uganda. The match was also Kenya's first ever WT20I. Later that day, in Kenya's match against Uganda, Abel, who had been billed prior to the tournament as one of her team's stars, was named as player of the match for taking 5/18, but Uganda won the encounter by 34 runs.

Abel finished the Tri-Series with the most wickets and the best bowling average for Kenya, and with the team's third highest batting aggregate and average. She was also one of only two Kenyans to be included in the Team of the Tournament, and was said to have taken the catch of the series.

Abel was not part of Kenya's squad for the ICC Women's Qualifier Africa held in Harare, Zimbabwe, in May 2019. Kenya and Abel played their next WT20Is during a bilateral series of seven matches against Botswana in Gaborone, Botswana, in December 2019. The series had originally been planned as another tri-series, but the intended third team, Namibia, had been forced to withdraw. Kenya won the series 4–1, with two matches abandoned due to rain. Abel's best bowling was 3/13 in the second match, and her highest score was 23 in the sixth match.

Due to the onset of the COVID-19 pandemic, Kenya did not play any further WT20Is until June 2021, when the team competed in and won its fourth Kwibuka Tournament.

In Kenya's first match in that tournament, against Botswana, Abel scored 35* to help her team to what was described by Women's CricZone as "a crushing win", by nine wickets. Later, against Nigeria and Rwanda, she made 40 and 47*, respectively, and in the latter match she also took 2/17. For those performances, she was awarded player of the match in both contests.

Abel did not then play a prominent role in either her team's victory over Rwanda in the semi-final, or its upset triumph over pre-tournament favourites Namibia in the final. However, she was ultimately named as player of the tournament, and as a member of the team of the tournament, for her overall total of 165 runs, 7 wickets, and 5 catches.

In January 2022, Abel took the field for Kenya in the Commonwealth Games Cricket Qualifier in Kuala Lumpur, Malaysia. Her best performances came in her team's encounters with the two leading teams. Against Bangladesh, she took 3/14, and against Sri Lanka, she top scored for her team with 33 in 53 balls. However, Kenya lost all of its matches and finished last in the Qualifier, which was won by Sri Lanka with Bangladesh as runner-up.

== See also ==
- List of Kenya women Twenty20 International cricketers
