= Abdul Rehman (Kenyan cricketer) =

Kenyan cricketer

Personal information
- Full name: Abdul Tashfin Rehman
- Born: 23 June 1980 (age 46); Lahore, Punjab, Pakistan
- Batting: Right-handed
- Bowling: Right-arm off break

Career statistics
Competition	Twenty20
Matches	4
Runs scored	11
Batting average	5.50
100s/50s	–/–
Top score	6
Balls bowled	84
Wickets	5
Bowling average	18.40
5 wickets in innings	–
10 wickets in match	–
Best bowling	3/21
Catches/stumpings	–/–
- Source: ESPNcricinfo, 22 September 2021

Abdul Tashfin Rehman (born 23 June 1980) is a Pakistani-born Kenyan former cricketer.

Abdul Rehman was born at Lahore in the Pakistani province of Punjab in June 1980. He later emigrated to Kenya, where he played club cricket for Kenya Kongonis Cricket Club. In November 2011, he toured Namibia with Kenya and played in four Twenty20 matches against the Namibia national cricket team at Windhoek, Playing as a bowler, Abdul Rehman took 5 wickets in his four matches, with best figures of 3 for 21. As a batsman, he scored 11 runs with a highest score of 6. Abdul Rehman later played club cricket for Sir Ali Muslim Club.
