= International cricket in 2021 =

International cricket season

The 2021 international cricket season took place from May 2021 to September 2021. 13 Tests, 56 One Day Internationals (ODIs), 45 Twenty20 Internationals (T20Is) were scheduled to be held in this season. The final of the 2019–2021 ICC World Test Championship took place in June at the Rose Bowl in Southampton, England, with New Zealand beating India by eight wickets. The 2021–2023 ICC World Test Championship started in August 2021, with India's tour of England.

Qualification for the 2023 ICC Women's T20 World Cup also started, with Scotland hosting the first regional qualifier group in August. Also in women's international cricket, 18 Women's One Day International (WODI) and 23 Women's Twenty20 International (WT20I) matches were scheduled to be played, along with a women's Test match between England and India. Additionally, a number of other T20I/WT20I matches were scheduled to be played in minor series involving associate nations.

The impact of the COVID-19 pandemic continued into the 2021 international calendar. In November 2020, the planned Cricket World Cup Super League fixtures between the Netherlands and England were postponed. The series was originally scheduled to be played in May 2021, but it was moved to May 2022 due to the pandemic. In February 2021, round eight of the ICC Cricket World Cup League 2 tournament, scheduled to take place in Papua New Guinea, was also postponed. In June, the ninth round of the tournament, scheduled to take place in Spain, was postponed until 2022. On 22 July 2021, Cricket Ireland confirmed that their home series against Zimbabwe would be rescheduled due to quarantine requirements needed for the visiting team. Later the same day, the second ODI match between the West Indies and Australia was postponed following a positive COVID-19 case. The Cricket World Cup Challenge League B tournament originally scheduled to be played in Jersey during September, was rescheduled to take place in Hong Kong in December 2021.

In September 2021, the fifth Test match between England and India was cancelled a few hours before the scheduled start, due to COVID-19 cases in the Indian camp. The match was rescheduled to take place in July 2022, ahead of India's white-ball tour of England.

== Season overview ==
Men's international tours
Start date	Home team	Away team	Results [Matches]		
Start date	Home team	Away team	Test	ODI	T20I
19 May 2021	Netherlands	Scotland	—	1–1 [2]	—
23 May 2021	Bangladesh	Sri Lanka	—	2–1 [3]	—
2 June 2021	Netherlands	Ireland	—	2–1 [3]	—
2 June 2021	England	New Zealand	0–1 [2]	—	—
10 June 2021	West Indies	South Africa	0–2 [2]	—	2–3 [5]
23 June 2021	England	Sri Lanka	—	2–0 [3]	3–0 [3]
7 July 2021	Zimbabwe	Bangladesh	0–1 [1]	0–3 [3]	1–2 [3]
8 July 2021	England	Pakistan	—	3–0 [3]	2–1 [3]
9 July 2021	West Indies	Australia	—	1–2 [3]	4–1 [5]
11 July 2021	Ireland	South Africa	—	1–1 [3]	0–3 [3]
18 July 2021	Sri Lanka	India	—	1–2 [3]	2–1 [3]
28 July 2021	West Indies	Pakistan	1–1 [2]	—	0–1 [4]
July 2021 (Note: The series was scheduled to start in July, but did not take place.)	Sri Lanka	Afghanistan	—	[3]	[3]
3 August 2021	Bangladesh	Australia	—	—	4–1 [5]
4 August 2021 (Note: The fifth Test was cancelled due to the number of COVID-19 cases in the Indian camp.)	England	India	2–2 [5]	—	—
27 August 2021 (Note: The series was postponed due to the COVID-19 pandemic.)	Ireland	Zimbabwe	—	1–1 [3]	3–2 [5]
15 September 2021	Scotland	Zimbabwe	—	—	1–2 [3]
Men's international tournaments
Start date	Tournament				Winners
13 May 2021 (Note: The tournament was cancelled due to the COVID-19 pandemic.)	2021 Papua New Guinea Tri-Nation Series				—N/a
18 June 2021	(England) ICC World Test Championship Final				New Zealand
20 July 2021	(Spain) 2021 Scotland Tri-Nation Series				—N/a
August 2021 (Note: The series was scheduled to start in August, but did not take place.)	2021 United States Tri-Nation Series				—N/a

Women's international tours
Start date	Home team	Away team	Results [Matches]		
Start date	Home team	Away team	WTest	WODI	WT20I
24 May 2021	Ireland	Scotland	—	—	3–1 [4]
16 June 2021	England	India	0–0 [1]	2–1 [3]	2–1 [3]
30 June 2021	West Indies	Pakistan	—	3–2 [5]	3–0 [3]
26 July 2021	Ireland	Netherlands	—	—	2–1 [4]
27 August 2021	Zimbabwe	Thailand	—	—	1–2 [3]
31 August 2021	West Indies	South Africa	—	1–4 [5]	1–1 [3]
1 September 2021	England	New Zealand	—	4–1 [5]	2–1 [3]

== Rankings ==
The following were the rankings at the beginning of the season.

ICC Men's Test Team Rankings 13 May 2021
Rank	Team	Matches	Points	Rating
1	India	24	2,914	121
2	New Zealand	18	2,166	120
3	England	32	3,493	109
4	Australia	17	1,844	108
5	Pakistan	24	2,247	94
6	West Indies	24	2,024	84
7	South Africa	16	1,273	80
8	Sri Lanka	27	2,095	78
9	Bangladesh	15	694	46
10	Zimbabwe	10	346	35

ICC Men's ODI Team Rankings 3 May 2021
Rank	Team	Matches	Points	Rating
1	New Zealand	17	2,054	121
2	Australia	25	2,945	118
3	India	29	3,344	115
4	England	27	3,100	115
5	South Africa	20	2,137	107
6	Pakistan	24	2,323	97
7	Bangladesh	24	2,157	90
8	West Indies	27	2,222	82
9	Sri Lanka	21	1,652	79
10	Afghanistan	17	1,054	62
11	Netherlands	2	99	50
12	Ireland	18	818	45
13	Zimbabwe	15	588	39
14	Oman	7	240	34
15	Scotland	5	148	30
16	Nepal	5	119	24
Only the top 16 teams are shown

ICC Men's T20I Team Rankings 3 May 2021
Rank	Team	Matches	Points	Rating
1	England	22	6,088	277
2	India	25	6,811	272
3	New Zealand	23	6,048	263
4	Pakistan	30	7,818	261
5	Australia	23	5,930	258
6	South Africa	19	4,703	248
7	Afghanistan	12	2,826	236
8	Sri Lanka	13	2,957	227
9	Bangladesh	13	2,921	225
10	West Indies	18	3,992	222
11	Zimbabwe	19	3,628	191
12	Ireland	18	3,388	188
13	Nepal	19	3,556	187
14	Scotland	11	2,035	185
15	United Arab Emirates	11	2,023	184
16	Papua New Guinea	14	2,501	179
Only the top 16 teams are shown

ICC Women's ODI Rankings 11 April 2021
Rank	Team	Matches	Points	Rating
1	Australia	18	2,955	164
2	South Africa	24	2,828	118
3	England	17	1,993	117
4	India	20	2,226	111
5	New Zealand	21	1,947	93
6	West Indies	12	1,025	85
7	Pakistan	15	1,101	73
8	Bangladesh	5	306	61
9	Sri Lanka	11	519	47
10	Ireland	2	25	13

ICC Women's T20I Rankings 30 March 2021
Rank	Team	Matches	Points	Rating
1	Australia	31	8,967	289
2	England	33	9,358	284
3	India	35	9,344	267
4	New Zealand	28	7,474	267
5	South Africa	30	7,569	252
6	West Indies	26	6,126	236
7	Pakistan	27	6,216	230
8	Sri Lanka	18	3,631	202
9	Bangladesh	26	5,001	192
10	Ireland	13	2,180	168
11	Thailand	26	4,145	159
12	Zimbabwe	11	1,711	156
13	Scotland	10	1,491	149
14	Nepal	11	1,457	132
15	Papua New Guinea	11	1,423	129
16	Samoa	6	749	125
Only the top 16 teams are shown

=== On-going tournaments ===
The following were the rankings at the beginning of the season.

2019–2021 ICC World Test Championship
Rank	Team	Series	PCT
1	India	6	72.2%
2	New Zealand	5	70.0%
3	Australia	4	69.2%
4	England	6	61.4%
5	Pakistan	5.5	43.3%
6	West Indies	5	33.3%
7	South Africa	4	30.0%
8	Sri Lanka	6	27.8%
9	Bangladesh	3.5	4.8%
Full Table

2020–2023 ICC Cricket World Cup Super League
Rank	Team	Matches	Points
1	England	9	40
2	Pakistan	6	40
3	Australia	6	40
4	New Zealand	3	30
5	Afghanistan	3	30
6	Bangladesh	6	30
7	West Indies	6	30
8	India	6	29
9	Zimbabwe	3	10
10	Ireland	6	10
11	South Africa	3	9
12	Netherlands	0	0
13	Sri Lanka	3	−2
Full Table

2019–2023 ICC Cricket World Cup League 2
Rank	Team	Matches	Points
1	Oman	10	16
2	United States	12	12
3	Scotland	8	9
4	Namibia	7	8
5	United Arab Emirates	7	7
6	Nepal	4	4
7	Papua New Guinea	8	0
Full Table

2019–22 ICC Cricket World Cup Challenge League
League A
Rank	Team	Matches	Points
1	Canada	5	8
2	Singapore	5	8
3	Qatar	5	6
4	Denmark	5	4
5	Malaysia	5	2
6	Vanuatu	5	2
Full Table

2019–22 ICC Cricket World Cup Challenge League
League B
Rank	Team	Matches	Points
1	Uganda	5	10
2	Hong Kong	5	7
3	Italy	5	5
4	Jersey	5	4
5	Kenya	5	3
6	Bermuda	5	1
Full Table

== May ==
=== Scotland in Netherlands ===
ODI series
No.	Date	Home captain	Away captain	Venue	Result
ODI 4288	19 May	Pieter Seelaar	Kyle Coetzer	Hazelaarweg Stadion, Rotterdam	Netherlands by 14 runs
ODI 4289	20 May	Pieter Seelaar	Kyle Coetzer	Hazelaarweg Stadion, Rotterdam	Scotland by 6 wickets

=== Sri Lanka in Bangladesh ===
The tour was originally scheduled to take place in December 2020, but was moved to May 2021.

2020–2023 ICC Cricket World Cup Super League – ODI series
No.	Date	Home captain	Away captain	Venue	Result
ODI 4290	23 May	Tamim Iqbal	Kusal Perera	Sher-e-Bangla National Cricket Stadium, Dhaka	Bangladesh by 33 runs
ODI 4291	25 May	Tamim Iqbal	Kusal Perera	Sher-e-Bangla National Cricket Stadium, Dhaka	Bangladesh by 103 runs (DLS)
ODI 4292	28 May	Tamim Iqbal	Kusal Perera	Sher-e-Bangla National Cricket Stadium, Dhaka	Sri Lanka by 97 runs

=== Scotland women in Ireland ===
WT20I series
No.	Date	Home captain	Away captain	Venue	Result
WT20I 892	24 May	Laura Delany	Kathryn Bryce	Stormont, Belfast	Scotland by 11 runs
WT20I 893	25 May	Laura Delany	Kathryn Bryce	Stormont, Belfast	Ireland by 61 runs
WT20I 894	26 May	Laura Delany	Kathryn Bryce	Stormont, Belfast	Ireland by 41 runs
WT20I 895	27 May	Laura Delany	Kathryn Bryce	Stormont, Belfast	Ireland by 6 wickets

=== 2021 Papua New Guinea Tri-Nation Series ===
The series was postponed in February 2021 due to the COVID-19 pandemic.

2019–2023 ICC Cricket World Cup League 2 – Tri-series
No.	Date	Team 1	Captain 1	Team 2	Captain 2	Venue	Result
[ 1st ODI]	May					Amini Park, Port Moresby	
[ 2nd ODI]	May					Amini Park, Port Moresby	
[ 3rd ODI]	May					Amini Park, Port Moresby	
[ 4th ODI]	May					Amini Park, Port Moresby	
[ 5th ODI]	May					Amini Park, Port Moresby	
[ 6th ODI]	May					Amini Park, Port Moresby	

== June ==
=== Ireland in Netherlands ===
2020–2023 ICC Cricket World Cup Super League – ODI series
No.	Date	Home captain	Away captain	Venue	Result
ODI 4293	2 June	Pieter Seelaar	Andrew Balbirnie	Sportpark Maarschalkerweerd, Utrecht	Netherlands by 1 run
ODI 4294	4 June	Pieter Seelaar	Andrew Balbirnie	Sportpark Maarschalkerweerd, Utrecht	Ireland by 8 wickets
ODI 4295	7 June	Pieter Seelaar	Andrew Balbirnie	Sportpark Maarschalkerweerd, Utrecht	Netherlands by 4 wickets

=== New Zealand in England ===
Test series
No.	Date	Home captain	Away captain	Venue	Result
Test 2422	2–6 June	Joe Root	Kane Williamson	Lord's, London	Match drawn
Test 2423	10–14 June	Joe Root	Tom Latham	Edgbaston, Birmingham	New Zealand by 8 wickets

=== South Africa in West Indies ===
Sir Vivian Richards Trophy, 2019–2021 ICC World Test Championship – Test series
No.	Date	Home captain	Away captain	Venue	Result
Test 2424	10–14 June	Kraigg Brathwaite	Dean Elgar	Daren Sammy Cricket Ground, Saint Lucia	South Africa by an innings and 63 runs
Test 2426	18–22 June	Kraigg Brathwaite	Dean Elgar	Daren Sammy Cricket Ground, Saint Lucia	South Africa by 158 runs
T20I series
No.	Date	Home captain	Away captain	Venue	Result
T20I 1176	26 June	Kieron Pollard	Temba Bavuma	National Cricket Stadium, Grenada	West Indies by 8 wickets
T20I 1178	27 June	Kieron Pollard	Temba Bavuma	National Cricket Stadium, Grenada	South Africa by 16 runs
T20I 1179	29 June	Kieron Pollard	Temba Bavuma	National Cricket Stadium, Grenada	South Africa by 1 run
T20I 1180	1 July	Kieron Pollard	Temba Bavuma	National Cricket Stadium, Grenada	West Indies by 21 runs
T20I 1181	3 July	Kieron Pollard	Temba Bavuma	National Cricket Stadium, Grenada	South Africa by 25 runs

=== India women in England ===
Only WTest
No.	Date	Home captain	Away captain	Venue	Result
WTest 141	16–19 June	Heather Knight	Mithali Raj	Bristol County Ground, Bristol	Match drawn
WODI series
WODI 1198	27 June	Heather Knight	Mithali Raj	Bristol County Ground, Bristol	England by 8 wickets
WODI 1199	30 June	Heather Knight	Mithali Raj	County Ground, Taunton	England by 5 wickets
WODI 1200	3 July	Heather Knight	Mithali Raj	New Road, Worcester	India by 4 wickets
WT20I series
WT20I 916	9 July	Heather Knight	Harmanpreet Kaur	County Cricket Ground, Northampton	England by 18 runs (DLS)
WT20I 919	11 July	Heather Knight	Harmanpreet Kaur	County Cricket Ground, Hove	India by 8 runs
WT20I 920	14 July	Heather Knight	Harmanpreet Kaur	County Cricket Ground, Chelmsford	England by 8 wickets

=== World Test Championship Final ===
Only Test
No.	Date	Team 1	Captain 1	Team 2	Captain 2	Venue	Result
Test 2425	18–23 June	India	Virat Kohli	New Zealand	Kane Williamson	Rose Bowl, Southampton	New Zealand by 8 wickets

=== Sri Lanka in England ===
T20I series
No.	Date	Home captain	Away captain	Venue	Result
T20I 1165	23 June	Eoin Morgan	Kusal Perera	Sophia Gardens, Cardiff	England by 8 wickets
T20I 1168	24 June	Eoin Morgan	Kusal Perera	Sophia Gardens, Cardiff	England by 5 wickets (DLS)
T20I 1174	26 June	Eoin Morgan	Kusal Perera	Rose Bowl, Southampton	England by 89 runs
2020–2023 ICC Cricket World Cup Super League – ODI series
No.	Date	Home captain	Away captain	Venue	Result
ODI 4296	29 June	Eoin Morgan	Kusal Perera	Riverside Ground, Chester-le-Street	England by 5 wickets
ODI 4297	1 July	Eoin Morgan	Kusal Perera	The Oval, London	England by 8 wickets
ODI 4298	4 July	Eoin Morgan	Kusal Perera	Bristol County Ground, Bristol	No result

=== Pakistan women in West Indies ===
WT20I series
No.	Date	Home captain	Away captain	Venue	Result
WT20I 910	30 June	Stafanie Taylor	Javeria Khan	Sir Vivian Richards Stadium, Antigua	West Indies by 10 runs
WT20I 911	2 July	Stafanie Taylor	Javeria Khan	Coolidge Cricket Ground, Antigua	West Indies by 7 runs (DLS)
WT20I 912	4 July	Stafanie Taylor	Javeria Khan	Sir Vivian Richards Stadium, Antigua	West Indies by 6 wickets
WODI series
No.	Date	Home captain	Away captain	Venue	Result
WODI 1201	7 July	Stafanie Taylor	Javeria Khan	Coolidge Cricket Ground, Antigua	West Indies by 5 wickets
WODI 1202	9 July	Stafanie Taylor	Javeria Khan	Coolidge Cricket Ground, Antigua	West Indies by 8 wickets
WODI 1203	12 July	Anisa Mohammed	Javeria Khan	Sir Vivian Richards Stadium, Antigua	West Indies by 8 wickets
WODI 1204	15 July	Stafanie Taylor	Javeria Khan	Sir Vivian Richards Stadium, Antigua	Pakistan by 4 wickets
WODI 1205	18 July	Stafanie Taylor	Javeria Khan	Sir Vivian Richards Stadium, Antigua	Pakistan by 22 runs (DLS)

== July ==
=== Bangladesh in Zimbabwe ===
Only Test
No.	Date	Home captain	Away captain	Venue	Result
Test 2427	7–11 July	Brendan Taylor	Mominul Haque	Harare Sports Club, Harare	Bangladesh by 220 runs
2020–2023 ICC Cricket World Cup Super League – ODI series
No.	Date	Home captain	Away captain	Venue	Result
ODI 4304	16 July	Brendan Taylor	Tamim Iqbal	Harare Sports Club, Harare	Bangladesh by 155 runs
ODI 4306	18 July	Brendan Taylor	Tamim Iqbal	Harare Sports Club, Harare	Bangladesh by 3 wickets
ODI 4308	20 July	Brendan Taylor	Tamim Iqbal	Harare Sports Club, Harare	Bangladesh by 5 wickets
T20I series
No.	Date	Home captain	Away captain	Venue	Result
T20I 1196	22 July	Sikandar Raza	Mahmudullah	Harare Sports Club, Harare	Bangladesh by 8 wickets
T20I 1198	23 July	Sikandar Raza	Mahmudullah	Harare Sports Club, Harare	Zimbabwe by 23 runs
T20I 1203	25 July	Sikandar Raza	Mahmudullah	Harare Sports Club, Harare	Bangladesh by 5 wickets

=== Pakistan in England ===
2020–2023 ICC Cricket World Cup Super League – ODI series
No.	Date	Home captain	Away captain	Venue	Result
ODI 4299	8 July	Ben Stokes	Babar Azam	Sophia Gardens, Cardiff	England by 9 wickets
ODI 4300	10 July	Ben Stokes	Babar Azam	Lord's, London	England by 52 runs
ODI 4303	13 July	Ben Stokes	Babar Azam	Edgbaston, Birmingham	England by 3 wickets
T20I series
No.	Date	Home captain	Away captain	Venue	Result
T20I 1191	16 July	Eoin Morgan	Babar Azam	Trent Bridge, Nottingham	Pakistan by 31 runs
T20I 1193	18 July	Jos Buttler	Babar Azam	Headingley, Leeds	England by 45 runs
T20I 1195	20 July	Eoin Morgan	Babar Azam	Old Trafford, Manchester	England by 3 wickets

=== Australia in West Indies ===
The second ODI was suspended following a positive test for COVID-19 from a non-playing member of the West Indies team. After no further cases, the second and third ODIs were rescheduled.

T20I series
No.	Date	Home captain	Away captain	Venue	Result
T20I 1185	9 July	Nicholas Pooran	Aaron Finch	Daren Sammy Cricket Ground, Saint Lucia	West Indies by 18 runs
T20I 1188	10 July	Nicholas Pooran	Aaron Finch	Daren Sammy Cricket Ground, Saint Lucia	West Indies by 56 runs
T20I 1189	12 July	Nicholas Pooran	Aaron Finch	Daren Sammy Cricket Ground, Saint Lucia	West Indies by 6 wickets
T20I 1190	14 July	Nicholas Pooran	Aaron Finch	Daren Sammy Cricket Ground, Saint Lucia	Australia by 4 runs
T20I 1192	16 July	Nicholas Pooran	Aaron Finch	Daren Sammy Cricket Ground, Saint Lucia	West Indies by 16 runs
2020–2023 ICC Cricket World Cup Super League – ODI series
No.	Date	Home captain	Away captain	Venue	Result
ODI 4310	20 July	Kieron Pollard	Alex Carey	Kensington Oval, Barbados	Australia by 133 runs (DLS)
ODI 4311	22–24 July	Kieron Pollard	Alex Carey	Kensington Oval, Barbados	West Indies by 4 wickets
ODI 4313	26 July	Kieron Pollard	Alex Carey	Kensington Oval, Barbados	Australia by 6 wickets

=== South Africa in Ireland ===
2020–2023 ICC Cricket World Cup Super League – ODI series
No.	Date	Home captain	Away captain	Venue	Result
ODI 4301	11 July	Andrew Balbirnie	Temba Bavuma	The Village, Dublin	No result
ODI 4302	13 July	Andrew Balbirnie	Temba Bavuma	The Village, Dublin	Ireland by 43 runs
ODI 4305	16 July	Andrew Balbirnie	Temba Bavuma	The Village, Dublin	South Africa by 70 runs
T20I series
No.	Date	Home captain	Away captain	Venue	Result
T20I 1194	19 July	Andrew Balbirnie	Temba Bavuma	The Village, Dublin	South Africa by 33 runs
T20I 1197	22 July	Andrew Balbirnie	Temba Bavuma	Stormont Cricket Ground, Belfast	South Africa by 42 runs
T20I 1200	24 July	Andrew Balbirnie	Temba Bavuma	Stormont Cricket Ground, Belfast	South Africa by 49 runs

=== India in Sri Lanka ===
The second T20I was postponed by one day following a positive test for COVID-19 from an Indian cricketer.

2020–2023 ICC Cricket World Cup Super League – ODI series
No.	Date	Home captain	Away captain	Venue	Result
ODI 4307	18 July	Dasun Shanaka	Shikhar Dhawan	R. Premadasa Stadium, Colombo	India by 7 wickets
ODI 4309	20 July	Dasun Shanaka	Shikhar Dhawan	R. Premadasa Stadium, Colombo	India by 3 wickets
ODI 4312	23 July	Dasun Shanaka	Shikhar Dhawan	R. Premadasa Stadium, Colombo	Sri Lanka by 3 wickets (DLS)
T20I series
No.	Date	Home captain	Away captain	Venue	Result
T20I 1204	25 July	Dasun Shanaka	Shikhar Dhawan	R. Premadasa Stadium, Colombo	India by 38 runs
T20I 1206	28 July	Dasun Shanaka	Shikhar Dhawan	R. Premadasa Stadium, Colombo	Sri Lanka by 4 wickets
T20I 1207	29 July	Dasun Shanaka	Shikhar Dhawan	R. Premadasa Stadium, Colombo	Sri Lanka by 7 wickets

=== 2021 Scotland Tri-Nation Series ===
The series was postponed in June 2021 due to the COVID-19 pandemic.

2019–2023 ICC Cricket World Cup League 2 – Tri-series
No.	Date	Team 1	Captain 1	Team 2	Captain 2	Venue	Result
[1st ODI]	20 July					Desert Springs Cricket Ground, Almeria	
[2nd ODI]	July					Desert Springs Cricket Ground, Almeria	
[3rd ODI]	July					Desert Springs Cricket Ground, Almeria	
[4th ODI]	July					Desert Springs Cricket Ground, Almeria	
[5th ODI]	July					Desert Springs Cricket Ground, Almeria	
[6th ODI]	July					Desert Springs Cricket Ground, Almeria	

=== Netherlands women in Ireland ===
WT20I series
No.	Date	Home captain	Away captain	Venue	Result
WT20I 921	26 July	Laura Delany	Heather Siegers	The Village, Dublin	Ireland by 28 runs
WT20I 921a	28 July	Laura Delany	Heather Siegers	The Village, Dublin	Match abandoned
WT20I 922	29 July	Laura Delany	Heather Siegers	The Village, Dublin	Ireland by 6 wickets
WT20I 923	30 July	Laura Delany	Heather Siegers	The Village, Dublin	Netherlands by 7 wickets (DLS)

=== Pakistan in West Indies ===
T20I series
No.	Date	Home captain	Away captain	Venue	Result
T20I 1205	28 July	Kieron Pollard	Babar Azam	Kensington Oval, Barbados	No result
T20I 1208	31 July	Kieron Pollard	Babar Azam	Guyana National Stadium, Guyana	Pakistan by 7 runs
T20I 1209	1 August	Kieron Pollard	Babar Azam	Guyana National Stadium, Guyana	No result
T20I 1211	3 August	Kieron Pollard	Babar Azam	Guyana National Stadium, Guyana	No result
2021–2023 ICC World Test Championship – Test series
No.	Date	Home captain	Away captain	Venue	Result
Test 2430	12–16 August	Kraigg Brathwaite	Babar Azam	Sabina Park, Jamaica	West Indies by 1 wicket
Test 2431	20–24 August	Kraigg Brathwaite	Babar Azam	Sabina Park, Jamaica	Pakistan by 109 runs

=== Afghanistan in Sri Lanka ===
The series was scheduled to start in July 2021, but did not take place. No official updates were issued by either cricket board or the ICC.

2020–2023 ICC Cricket World Cup Super League – ODI series
No.	Date	Home captain	Away captain	Venue	Result
[1st ODI]					
[2nd ODI]					
[3rd ODI]					
T20I series
No.	Date	Home captain	Away captain	Venue	Result
[1st T20I]					
[2nd T20I]					
[3rd T20I]					

== August ==
=== Australia in Bangladesh ===
T20I series
No.	Date	Home captain	Away captain	Venue	Result
T20I 1210	3 August	Mahmudullah	Matthew Wade	Sher-e-Bangla National Cricket Stadium, Dhaka	Bangladesh by 23 runs
T20I 1212	4 August	Mahmudullah	Matthew Wade	Sher-e-Bangla National Cricket Stadium, Dhaka	Bangladesh by 5 wickets
T20I 1216	6 August	Mahmudullah	Matthew Wade	Sher-e-Bangla National Cricket Stadium, Dhaka	Bangladesh by 10 runs
T20I 1218	7 August	Mahmudullah	Matthew Wade	Sher-e-Bangla National Cricket Stadium, Dhaka	Australia by 3 wickets
T20I 1222	9 August	Mahmudullah	Matthew Wade	Sher-e-Bangla National Cricket Stadium, Dhaka	Bangladesh by 60 runs

=== India in England ===
The fifth Test was cancelled following a number of COVID cases in the Indian camp. In October 2021, the England and Wales Cricket Board announced that the Test match would be played in July 2022.

Pataudi Trophy, 2021–2023 ICC World Test Championship – Test series
No.	Date	Home captain	Away captain	Venue	Result
Test 2428	4–8 August	Joe Root	Virat Kohli	Trent Bridge, Nottingham	Match drawn
Test 2429	12–16 August	Joe Root	Virat Kohli	Lord's, London	India by 151 runs
Test 2432	25–29 August	Joe Root	Virat Kohli	Headingley, Leeds	England by an innings and 76 runs
Test 2433	2–6 September	Joe Root	Virat Kohli	The Oval, London	India by 157 runs
Test 2470	1–5 July 2022	Ben Stokes	Jasprit Bumrah	Edgbaston, Birmingham	England by 7 wickets

=== Zimbabwe in Ireland ===
The series was postponed in July 2021, with rescheduled dates confirmed in August 2021.

T20I series
No.	Date	Home captain	Away captain	Venue	Result
T20I 1241	27 August	Andrew Balbirnie	Craig Ervine	Castle Avenue, Dublin	Zimbabwe by 3 runs
T20I 1242	29 August	Andrew Balbirnie	Craig Ervine	Castle Avenue, Dublin	Ireland by 7 wickets
T20I 1244	1 September	Andrew Balbirnie	Craig Ervine	Bready Cricket Club Ground, Magheramason	Ireland by 40 runs
T20I 1248	2 September	Andrew Balbirnie	Craig Ervine	Bready Cricket Club Ground, Magheramason	Ireland by 64 runs
T20I 1256	4 September	Andrew Balbirnie	Craig Ervine	Bready Cricket Club Ground, Magheramason	Zimbabwe by 5 runs
2020–2023 ICC Cricket World Cup Super League – ODI series
No.	Date	Home captain	Away captain	Venue	Result
ODI 4319	8 September	Andrew Balbirnie	Craig Ervine	Stormont Cricket Ground, Belfast	Zimbabwe by 38 runs
ODI 4321	10 September	Andrew Balbirnie	Craig Ervine	Stormont Cricket Ground, Belfast	No result
ODI 4323	13 September	Andrew Balbirnie	Craig Ervine	Stormont Cricket Ground, Belfast	Ireland by 7 wickets (DLS)

=== Thailand women in Zimbabwe ===
WT20I series
No.	Date	Home captain	Away captain	Venue	Result
WT20I 934	27 August	Mary-Anne Musonda	Naruemol Chaiwai	Takashinga Cricket Club, Harare	Zimbabwe by 1 wicket
WT20I 936	28 August	Mary-Anne Musonda	Naruemol Chaiwai	Takashinga Cricket Club, Harare	Thailand by 53 runs
WT20I 942	30 August	Mary-Anne Musonda	Naruemol Chaiwai	Takashinga Cricket Club, Harare	Thailand by 27 runs

=== South Africa women in West Indies ===
WT20I series
No.	Date	Home captain	Away captain	Venue	Result
WT20I 943	31 August	Anisa Mohammed	Dane van Niekerk	Sir Vivian Richards Stadium, Antigua	No result
WT20I 945	2 September	Anisa Mohammed	Dane van Niekerk	Sir Vivian Richards Stadium, Antigua	South Africa by 50 runs
WT20I 947	4 September	Anisa Mohammed	Dane van Niekerk	Sir Vivian Richards Stadium, Antigua	West Indies by 5 wickets
WT20I series
No.	Date	Home captain	Away captain	Venue	Result
WODI 1206	7 September	Anisa Mohammed	Dane van Niekerk	Coolidge Cricket Ground, Antigua	South Africa by 8 wickets
WODI 1207	10 September	Anisa Mohammed	Dane van Niekerk	Coolidge Cricket Ground, Antigua	South Africa by 9 wickets
WODI 1208	13 September	Anisa Mohammed	Dane van Niekerk	Coolidge Cricket Ground, Antigua	South Africa by 8 wickets
WODI 1210	16 September	Anisa Mohammed	Dane van Niekerk	Sir Vivian Richards Stadium, Antigua	South Africa by 35 runs
WODI 1212	19 September	Deandra Dottin	Dane van Niekerk	Sir Vivian Richards Stadium, Antigua	Match tied (West Indies won S/O)

=== 2021 United States Tri-Nation Series ===
2019–2023 ICC Cricket World Cup League 2 – Tri-series
No.	Date	Team 1	Captain 1	Team 2	Captain 2	Venue	Result
[1st ODI]	August						
[2nd ODI]	August						
[3rd ODI]	August						
[4th ODI]	August						
[5th ODI]	August						
[6th ODI]	August						

== September ==
=== New Zealand women in England ===
WT20I series
No.	Date	Home captain	Away captain	Venue	Result
WT20I 944	1 September	Nat Sciver	Sophie Devine	County Cricket Ground, Chelmsford	England by 46 runs
WT20I 946	4 September	Nat Sciver	Sophie Devine	County Cricket Ground, Hove	New Zealand by 4 wickets
WT20I 952	9 September	Heather Knight	Sophie Devine	County Ground, Taunton	England by 4 wickets
WODI series
No.	Date	Home captain	Away captain	Venue	Result
WODI 1209	16 September	Heather Knight	Sophie Devine	Bristol County Ground, Bristol	England by 30 runs
WODI 1211	19 September	Heather Knight	Sophie Devine	New Road, Worcester	England by 13 runs (DLS)
WODI 1214	21 September	Heather Knight	Sophie Devine	Grace Road, Leicester	New Zealand by 3 wickets
WODI 1215	23 September	Heather Knight	Sophie Devine	County Cricket Ground, Derby	England by 3 wickets
WODI 1218	26 September	Heather Knight	Sophie Devine	St Lawrence Ground, Canterbury	England by 203 runs

=== Zimbabwe in Scotland ===
T20I series
No.	Date	Home captain	Away captain	Venue	Result
T20I 1276	15 September	Kyle Coetzer	Craig Ervine	The Grange Club, Edinburgh	Scotland by 7 runs
T20I 1279	17 September	Kyle Coetzer	Craig Ervine	The Grange Club, Edinburgh	Zimbabwe by 10 runs
T20I 1280	19 September	Kyle Coetzer	Craig Ervine	The Grange Club, Edinburgh	Zimbabwe by 6 wickets

== See also ==
- Associate international cricket in 2021
- Impact of the COVID-19 pandemic on cricket
