= Emily Ruto =

Kenyan cricketer (1989–2014)

Personal information
- Born: 16 June 1989; Nairobi, Kenya
- Died: 24 October 2014 (aged 25); Nairobi, Kenya

International information
- National side: Kenya
- Source: Cricinfo, 26 October 2014

Emily Ruto (16 June 1989 – 24 October 2014) was a Kenyan cricketer and a former captain of the women's team. She died of leukemia in 2014, aged 25.
