= List of Kenya women Twenty20 International cricketers =

This is a list of Kenya women Twenty20 International cricketers. A Twenty20 International (T20I) is an international cricket match between two representative teams, each having T20I status, as determined by the International Cricket Council (ICC). A T20I is played under the rules of Twenty20 cricket.

This list includes all players who have played at least one T20I match for Kenya and is initially arranged in the order of debut appearance. Where more than one player won their first cap in the same match, their names are initially listed alphabetically at the time of debut.

== Key ==
General

- ‡ – Captain
- † – Wicket-keeper
- First – Year of debut
- Last – Year of latest game
- Mat – Number of matches played

Batting

- Runs – Runs scored in career
- HS – Highest score
- 50 – Number of half-centuries scored
- 100 – Centuries scored
- Avg – Runs scored per dismissal
- * – Batsman remained not out

Bowling

- Wkt – Wickets taken in career
- BBI – Best bowling in an innings
- Ave – Average runs per wicket

Fielding

- Ca – Catches taken
- St – Stumpings affected

== Players ==
Statistics are correct as of 6 September 2025.

Kenya women T20I cricketers
General					Batting					Bowling					Fielding		Ref
No.	Name	First	Last	Mat	Runs	HS	Avg	50	100	Balls	Wkt	BBI	Ave	5WI	Ca	St	Ref
1	Queentor Abel	2019	2025	69	1,537	109	26.50	8	1	1,347	94	5/5	11.30	2	40	0	
2	Sharon Juma‡†	2019	2023	37	422	39*	14.06	0	0	–	–	–	–	–	7	8	
3	Sylvia Kinyua	2019	2022	12	127	40	12.70	0	0	14	0	–	–	0	6	0	
4	Mary Mwangi†	2019	2025	47	403	31	12.21	0	0	528	28	4/9	15.71	0	7	1	
5	Teresia Mwangi	2019	2019	2	6	6*	6.00	0	0	18	0	–	–	0	0	0	
6	Monicah Ndhambi	2019	2025	32	176	37	8.80	0	0	42	1	1/6	38.00	0	7	0	
7	Margaret Ngoche‡	2019	2022	18	284	73	20.28	1	0	138	5	3/14	26.40	0	7	0	
8	Daisy Njoroge‡	2019	2023	33	316	82*	19.75	2	0	189	10	2/7	20.50	0	5	0	
9	Mercyline Ochieng	2019	2022	18	56	13*	7.00	0	0	384	16	3/11	16.06	0	5	0	
10	Venasa Ooko	2019	2025	72	781	57*	16.61	1	0	48	0	–	–	0	17	0	
11	Esther Wachira‡	2019	2025	75	641	54*	13.08	2	0	1,254	70	4/1	14.32	0	27	0	
12	Lavendah Idambo	2019	2025	68	197	20	7.03	0	0	1,139	58	4/14	15.74	0	8	0	
13	Veronica Abuga	2019	2025	46	528	56	13.53	1	0	–	–	–	–	–	9	0	
14	Edith Waithaka	2019	2024	12	19	11	4.75	0	0	228	9	3/20	20.11	0	3	0	
15	Flavia Odhiambo	2019	2024	56	40	7*	5.00	0	0	730	50	4/10	12.84	0	8	0	
16	Sarah Wetoto	2019	2022	23	254	33	18.14	0	0	326	24	6/16	11.12	2	5	0	
17	Faith Mutua	2019	2019	2	8	8*	–	0	0	2	1	1/0	0.00	0	0	0	
18	Melvin Khagoitsa‡	2021	2025	51	249	30	10.37	0	0	1104	52	5/13	13.73	1	17	0	
19	Jane Otieno	2021	2022	7	3	3*	3.00	0	0	–	–	–	–	–	1	0	
20	Ruth Achando†	2021	2025	11	12	11*	–	0	0	–	–	–	–	–	2	3	
21	Kelvia Ogola	2022	2024	25	16	5	3.20	0	0	74	2	1/0	34.00	0	10	0	
22	Josephine Abwom	2022	2025	11	30	15	10.00	0	0	–	–	–	–	–	2	0	
23	Mercy Sifuna	2022	2024	11	49	12	9.80	0	0	18	2	2/6	9.50	0	1	0	
24	Lynz Nabwire	2023	2023	3	1	1	1.00	0	0	30	2	1/6	13.00	0	0	0	
25	Marion Juma	2023	2024	11	30	11	6.00	0	0	12	0	–	0	–	0	0	
26	Ann Wanjira	2023	2025	21	75	14	6.25	0	0	333	14	3/22	23.28	0	2	0	
27	Charity Muthoni‡†	2023	2024	37	187	64	10.38	1	0	–	–	–	–	–	14	6	
28	Judith Ajiambo	2023	2025	26	6	2*	2.00	0	0	297	16	3/16	14.25	0	8	0	
29	Kreeshna Mehta	2023	2024	11	24	8	3.42	0	0	12	0	–	–	0	2	0	
30	Jemimah Ndanu	2023	2025	26	40	5	2.85	0	0	304	10	3/21	29.80	0	8	0	
31	Janet Nthenya	2024	2024	8	61	12*	10.16	0	0	28	2	1/8	22.50	0	1	0	
32	Awe Wambua	2024	2024	4	19	18	6.33	0	0	12	1	1/11	11.00	0	0	0	
33	Zainab Hamisi	2024	2024	5	19	6	4.75	0	0	–	–	–	–	–	0	0	
34	Rael Kaibunga	2024	2024	1	–	–	–	–	–	–	–	–	–	–	0	0	
