= East Africa Cup =

- Countries: Kenya, Uganda
- Administrator: Cricket Kenya
- Headquarters: Nairobi, Kenya
- Format: 50–over
- First edition: 2011-12
- Latest edition: 2013
- Next edition: 2014
- Tournament format: Double round-robin and Knockout
- Number of teams: 6
- Current champion: (Uganda) Rwenzori Warriors (1st title)
- Most successful: (Kenya) Kongonis; Coast Pekee; Rwenzori Warriors (1 title)
- Most runs: (Kenya) Rakep Patel (346)
- Most wickets: (Kenya) Mitesh Sanghani (19)

The East Africa Cup (EAC) is one of two domestic cricket competitions launched by Cricket Kenya in the aftermath of the Kenya national cricket team's disastrous showing at the 2011 Cricket World Cup. It is a 50 over competition that features 6 franchises, 4 from Kenya and 2 from Uganda, that compete against each other home and away in a league before the two teams that come top in the league square off in a final. Its main objective is to improve the standard of the cricket played in Kenya, and spark a revival on the international stage once again.

== Tournament history ==
The tournament was started in the wake of Kenya's disastrous 2011 Cricket World Cup campaign. Its main aim is to develop the standard of cricket both in Kenya and Uganda. This idea was first believed to be mooted by Cricket Kenya CEO Tom Sears.

=== 2011–12 season ===
This was the first running of the East Africa Cup and despite, some dominating performances in the group stage, Rwenzori Warriors, of Uganda came unstuck in the final versus Kongonis

=== 2012 season ===
This edition saw Coast Pekee totally reverse their fortunes from the previous tournament and emerge winners against Ruwenzori Warriors in the final.

=== 2013 season ===
This was launched on the 7th of August 2013 and ran from the second week of August until the second week of September. The tournament was won by Rwenzori Warriors.

== Franchises ==
4 Teams from Kenya plus two teams from Uganda has been taking part in the tournament. They are as follows:-

Team Name	Province	Sponsors	Captain	Head coach
(Kenya) Rising Stars Chuis	Nairobi Province Cricket Association	Rising Star Commodities	(Kenya) Collins Obuya	(Kenya) Sibtain Kassamali
(Kenya) Express Ndovu	Nairobi Province Cricket Association	Express Kenya	(Kenya) Rakep Patel	(Kenya) Peter Ongondo
(Kenya) Sameer Simbas	Nairobi Province Cricket Association	Sameer Group	(Kenya) Morris Ouma	(Kenya) Martin Suji
(Kenya) I & M Nyatis	Nairobi Province Cricket Association	I & M Bank	(Kenya) Tanmay Mishra	(Kenya) Lameck Onyango
(Uganda) Rwenzori Warriors	Uganda		(Uganda) Lawrence Sematimba	
(Uganda) Nile Knights	Uganda		(Uganda) Davis Arinaitwe	(Kenya) Martin Suji

== Broadcasting rights ==
Initially, SuperSport became the broadcast partner for Cricket Kenya, and was broadcast the inaugural East African competitions which was a big boost for the tournament. Following the success of the inaugural tournaments, SuperSport extended their deal with the board to another two years to broadcast the tournament till 2013.

== Results ==
Season	Winners	Runners-up	Teams
2011-12	(Kenya) Kongonis	(Uganda) Nile Knights	6
2012	(Kenya) Coast Pekee	(Uganda) Rwenzori Warriors	6
