= Nairobi County Cricket Association =

- Sport: Cricket
- Jurisdiction: Regional
- Founded: 1966
- Affiliation: Cricket Kenya
- Affiliation date: 2005
- Regional affiliation: Nairobi
- Chairman: Kanti Rabadia
- Secretary: Narendra Patel (Hon); Vishal Bhojani (fixtures)
- (Kenya)

The Nairobi County Cricket Association is the Affiliate of Cricket Kenya responsible for cricketing activities in the City of Nairobi. These included overseeing the Kenya Kongonis, and Kanbis Tigers franchises in the defunct East Africa Premier League and East Africa Cup cricket tournaments. It administers the Nairobi County Cricket League which, prior to the setting up of national cricket Leagues by Cricket Kenya, provided the bulk of players selected to the Kenya national cricket team. It is through delegates selected by Annual General Meetings convened by the provincial bodies such as NCCA, that Cricket Kenya picks its own officials.
