= William Rudd =

English cricketer

William James Rudd (29 June 1880 – 27 March 1971) was an English first-class cricketer active 1901–04 who played for Surrey. He was born in Little Amwell; died in Ipswich.
