= Cricket Kenya =

Kenyan sporting organization

- Sport: Cricket
- Jurisdiction: National
- Founded: 2005
- Affiliation: International Cricket Council
- Affiliation date: 2005
- Regional affiliation: African Cricket Association
- Affiliation date: 2005
- Chairperson: Bhavesh Gohil
- CEO: Ronald Bukusi
- Sponsor: Supersport, Faber Infinite, Aquamist, Adopt-a-Light
- Replaced: Kenya Cricket Association
- (founded): 1982

Official website
- www.kenyacricket.com
- (Kenya)

Cricket Kenya is the official ICC recognised organisation chosen to represent Kenya in terms of cricket issues. They are in charge of overseeing the Kenyan Cricket Team. Cricket Kenya organizes two six team regional tournaments in the T20 and 50 Over formats of the game to replace the defunct Sahara Elite League. These are the East Africa Cup and Premier League. Cricket Kenya organizes the Kenya national cricket team and conducts the international matches with the team.

== Structure ==
Cricket Kenya consists of a national board comprising a chairperson, vice chairperson, treasurer, secretary and directors selected from its affiliate county associations. For the 2026 Cricket Kenya Executive board elections, the following 19 Countes were cleared to send voting delegates

- Bungoma County Cricket Association
- Busia County Cricket Association
- Embu County Cricket Association
- Homa Bay County Cricket Association
- Laikipia County Cricket Association
- Homa Bay County Cricket Association
- Kajiado County Cricket Association
- Kakamega County Cricket Association
- Kiambu County Cricket Association
- Kilifi County Cricket Association
- Kirinyaga County Cricket Association
- Kisii County Cricket Association
- Kisumu County Cricket Association
- Lamu County Cricket Association
- Makueni County Cricket Association
- Murang'a County Cricket Association
- Nakuru County Cricket Association
- Narok County Cricket Association
- Nyamira County Cricket Association
- Vihiga County Cricket Association

Additionally, Nairobi County Cricket Association is reportedly compliant with the affiliation requirements of the Cricket Kenya elections, per their own internal elections held in August 2025. Formerly, under Kenya's old provincial administration, the active associations included, Rift Valley Cricket Association and Coast Cricket Association

== History ==
=== Cricket in Kenya ===
Cricket in Kenya dates back to the early 1890s when colonial settlers, and administrators began playing against one another in Nairobi and Mombasa among several other venues. The first match of any consequence took place in 1899, and in 1910 a three-day fixture between Officials and Settlers started, remaining the highlight of the domestic calendar until 1964, along with Europeans v. Asians which began in 1933. In 1966, Kenya become a member of the East African Cricket Conference (E.A.C.C.) and participated in its annual Quadrangular tournament which included the three East African countries and Zambia. The tournament played in each respective country by rotation saw Kenya winning nine of the 15 competitions between 1960 and 1980. A number of Kenyans took part in the 1975 World Cup as part of the East Africa side, and that unit again appeared in the inaugural 1979 ICC Trophy, but by 1982 Kenya were playing under their own flag, under the Kenya Cricket Association. It was under this body that Kenyan cricket reached its peak, at the 2003 Cricket World Cup, which it co-hosted and reached the semifinals of. In subsequent years, however, bitter disputes between board and players led to a series of strikes, but more cripplingly, the KCA found itself battling most of the country's stakeholders. By the end of the dispute in 2005, Kenyan cricket was in the doldrums, was sponsorless, and was effectively in international isolation. Later in the year it was stripped of its ODI status by the ICC.

=== Establishment of Cricket Kenya ===
The final installation of Cricket Kenya as the body in charge of cricket in Kenya came at the end of a long drawn out dispute the previous management, the Kenya Cricket Association and its Provincial boards among other stakeholders in the game. The dispute, which centered around issues such as floundering constitutional review, and financial irregularities which had seen the KCA rack up almost 500,000 dollars of debt, and as well as periodic player disputes over pay that eventually saw the KCA lose all credibility within Kenyan cricketing circles as players, administrators and even the Kenya government gradually withdrew all recognition and support of the KCA in favour of Cricket Kenya, which was then an interim board put together by the Kenya Government to avoid the chaos that had been created by the KCA over the management of Cricket in Kenya. Ultimately, with the intervention of a high powered ICC delegation led by Percy Sonn and Peter Chingoka, an agreement on a new elections and a new constitution was agreed upon. The board members that were elected in the subsequent elections then formally wound up the Kenya Cricket Association paving the way for its official replacement by a new organisational body to be known as Cricket Kenya. Tom Tikolo served as the CEO of Cricket Kenya from 2005 to 2009 when he resigned due to cash scandal. After extensive searching he was replaced by Tom Sears in mid-2010. Sears himself stepped down in mid 2012 to pursue a career in rugby administration.

== Partnership with Kisumu County ==
Kisumu Governor Anyang' Nyong'o announced a partnership with Cricket Kenya to transform the cricket grounds at Jaramogi Oginga Odinga Sports Complex into a premier community sports venue. Following a "highly productive" meeting with Cricket Kenya officials, including CEO Ronald Bukusi and Director of Women's Cricket Pearlyne Omamo, Nyong'o emphasized this revitalization as central to his vision of promoting cricket and fostering sportsmanship among youth and local clubs in Western Kenya. The upgraded facility aims to provide top-tier infrastructure for the region’s cricket enthusiasts.

The governor commended Cricket Kenya’s ongoing initiative training students in 25 schools nationwide and highlighted Kisumu’s strategic role as a development hub for budding cricketers from Western and Nyanza regions. Nyong'o stressed that this project will not only nurture local talent but also position Kisumu as a sports-tourism destination, attracting local and international events to boost the regional economy through enhanced facilities and expanded outreach programs.

== See also ==
- Kenya national cricket team
