= Remembrance Arcade (Lagos) =

Cenotaph site in Nigeria

- Interactive map of Remembrance Arcade
- Location: Tafawa Balewa Square, Lagos, Nigeria
- Coordinates: 6.4281°N 3.4145°E
- Type: War memorial

The Remembrance Arcade located at the Tafawa Balewa Square, Lagos, is a cenotaph site used to commemorate Nigerian soldiers who died in World War I, World War II and the Nigerian Civil War. It is located within the Tafawa Balewa Square in the Lagos Central Business District. The Armed Forces Remembrance celebrations are performed yearly at this site. At the entrance of the site, a statue of an unknown soldier with a gun can be seen facing the entrance. The green space is laid out with grasses, pavements, and the cenotaph.

== Gallery ==
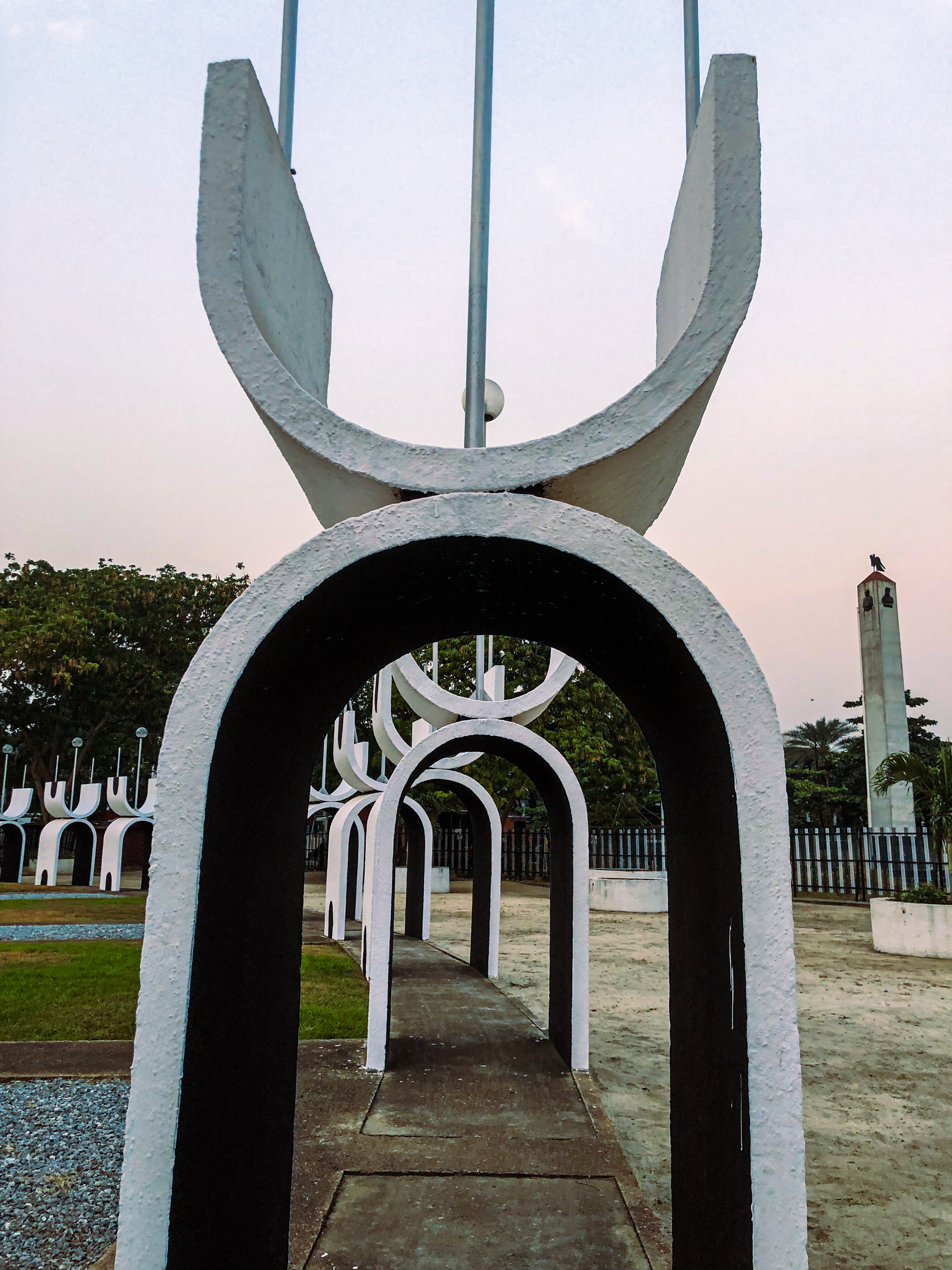

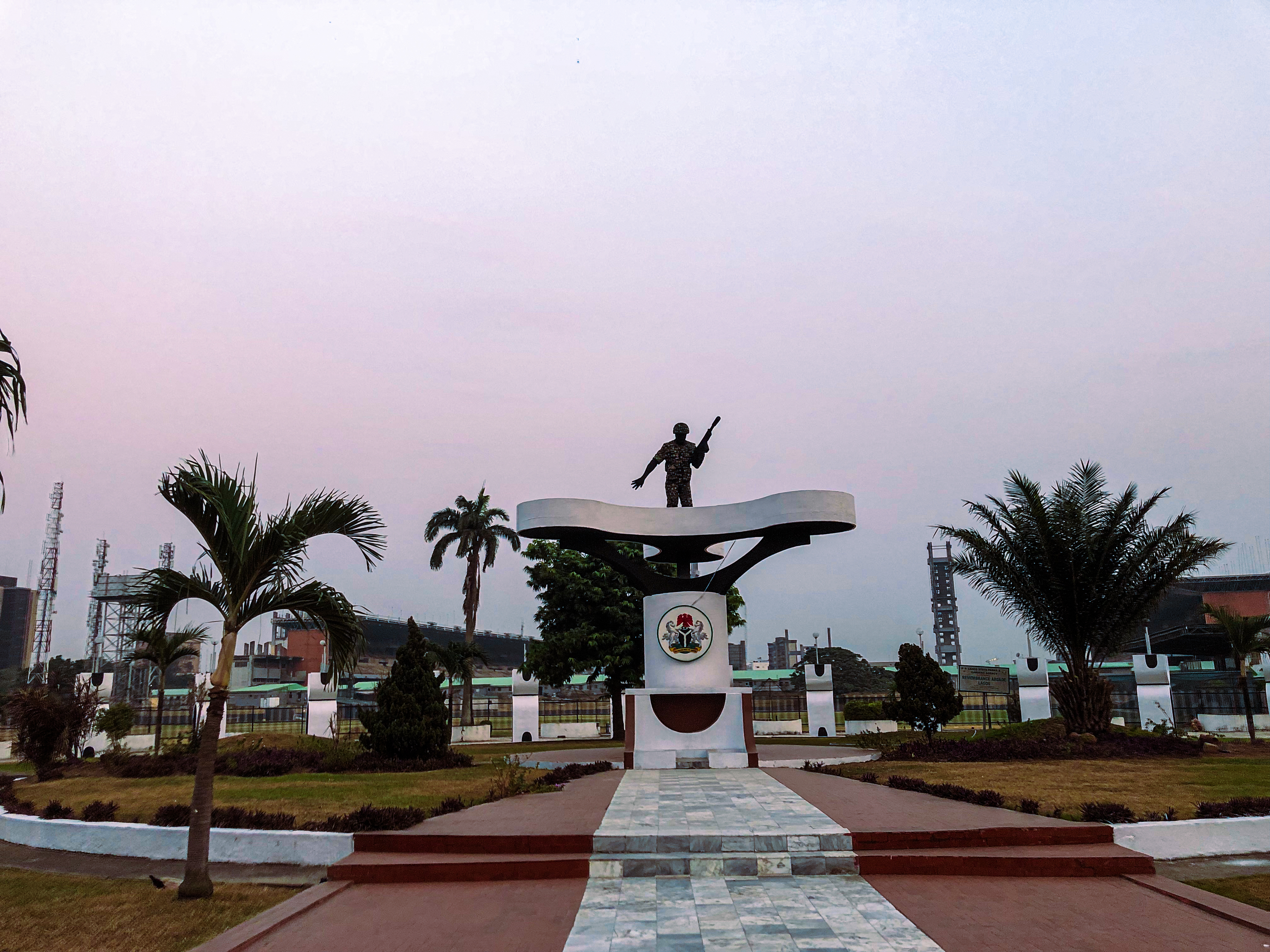

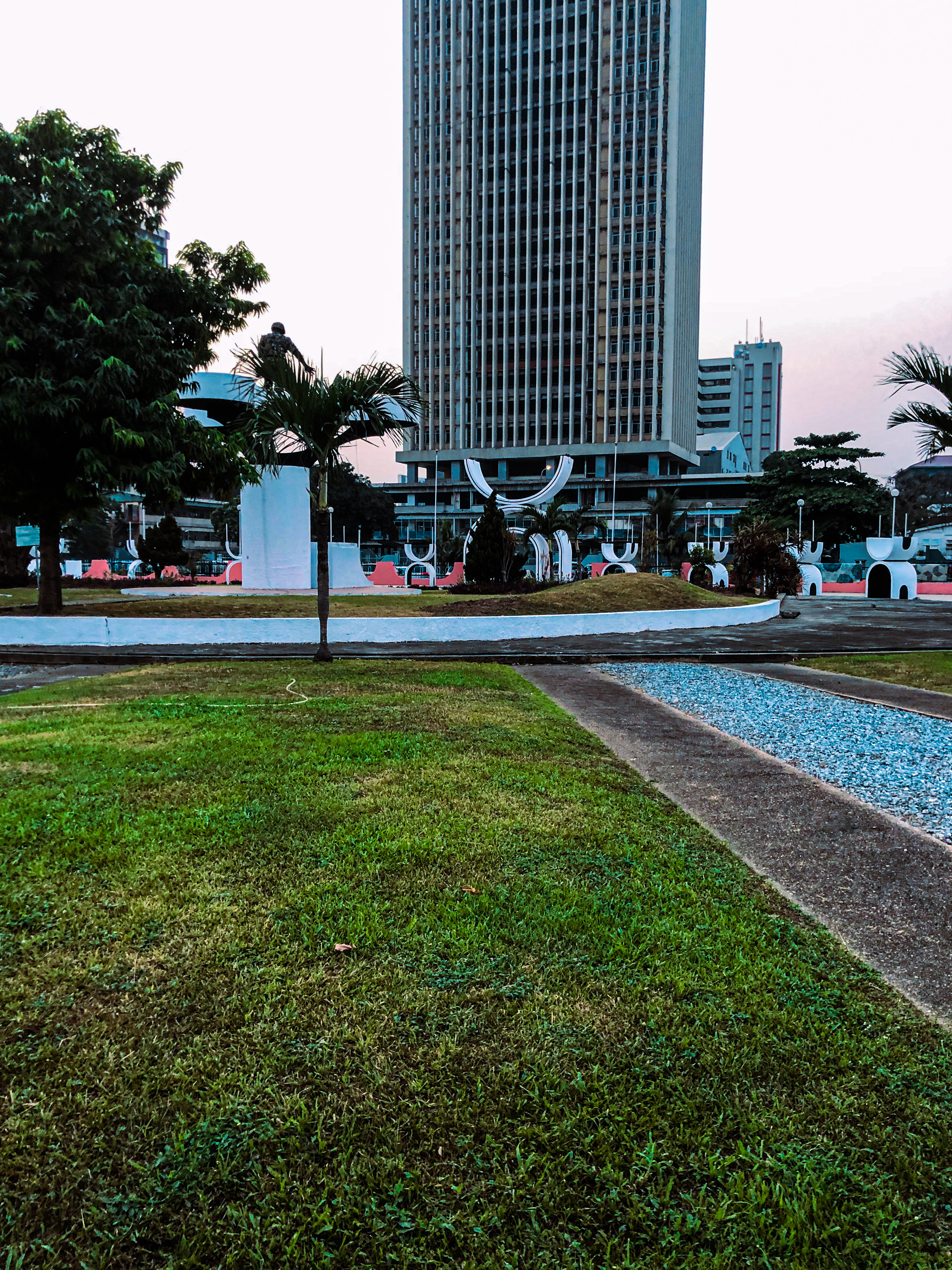

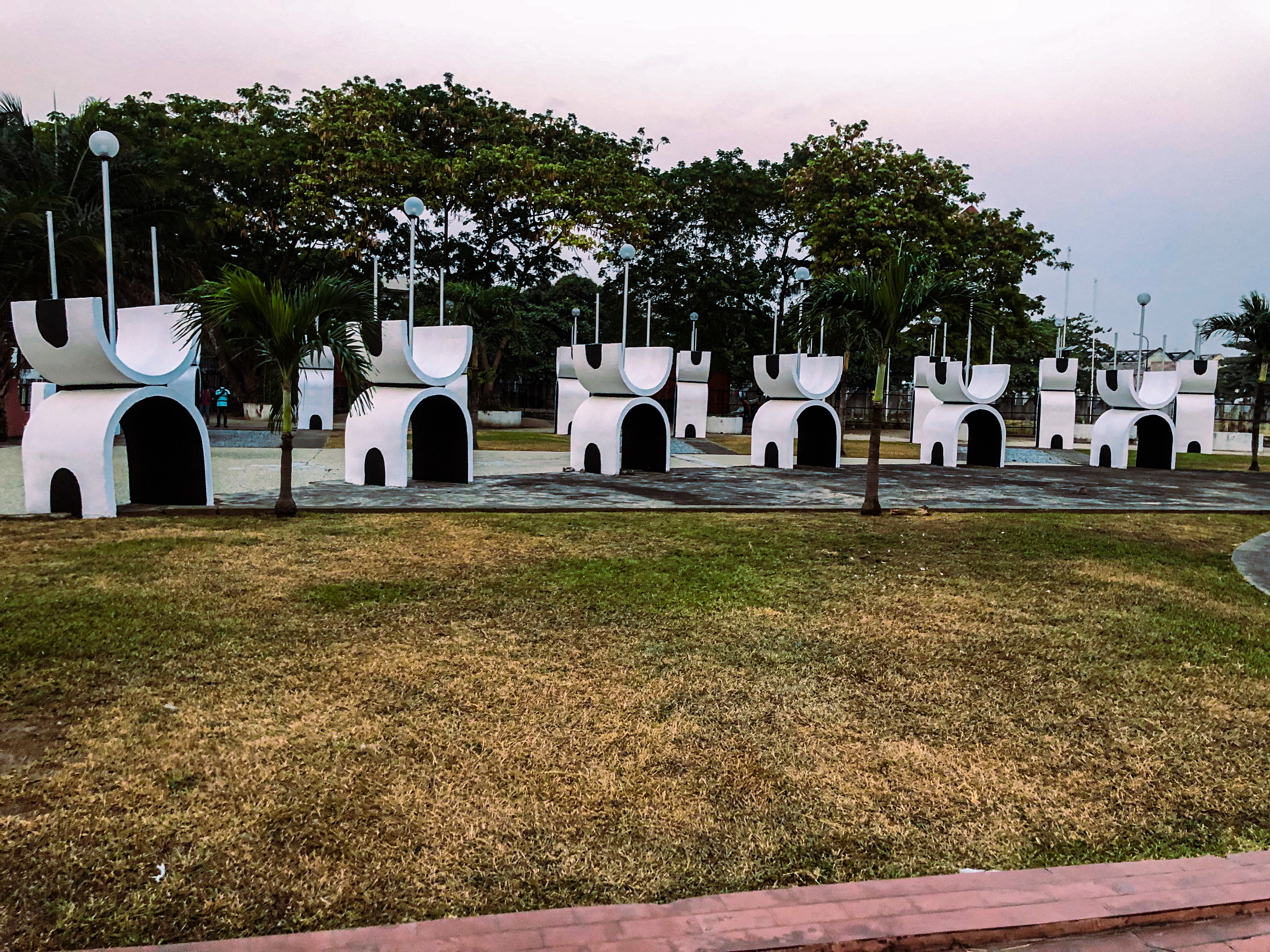

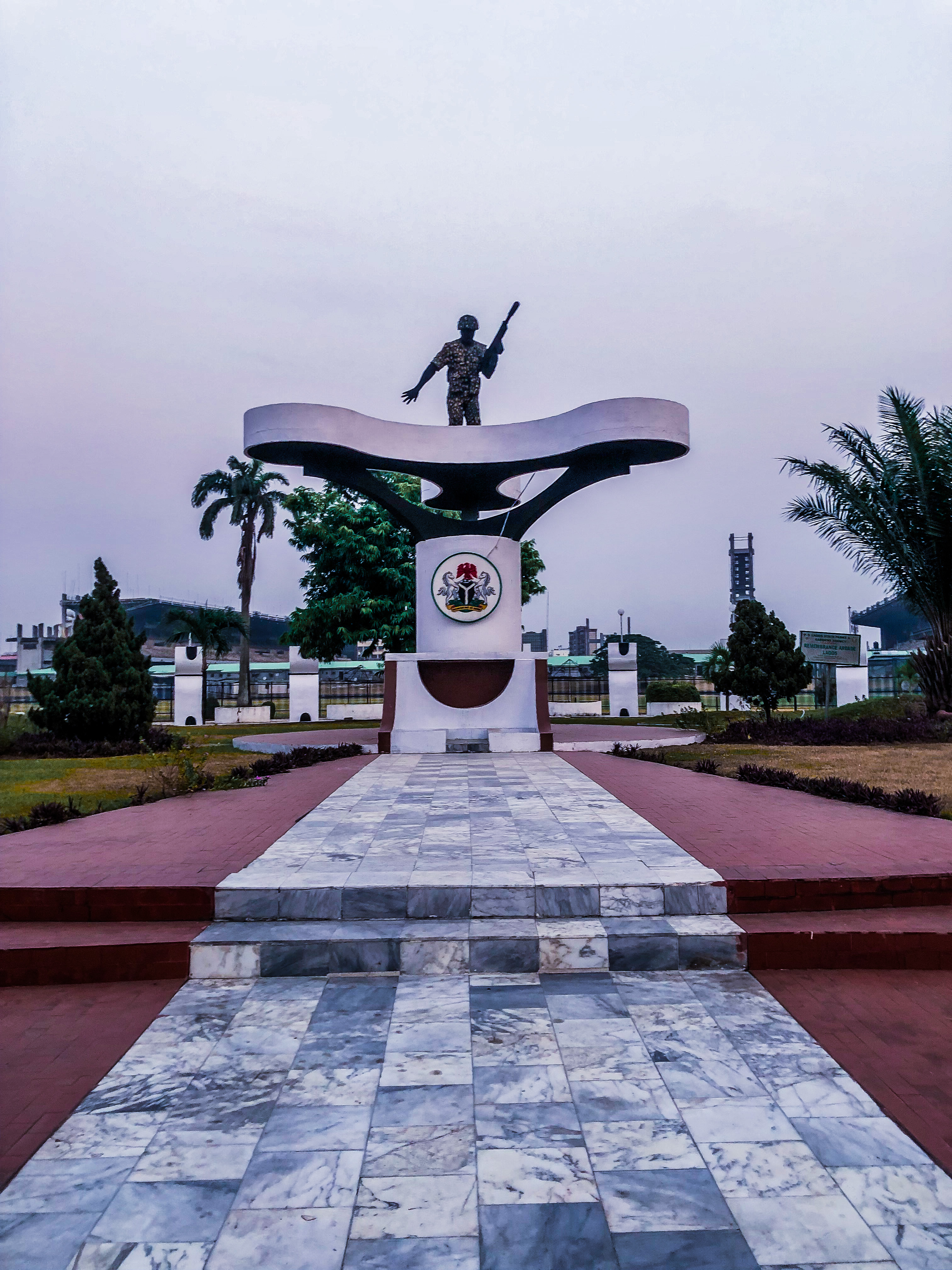

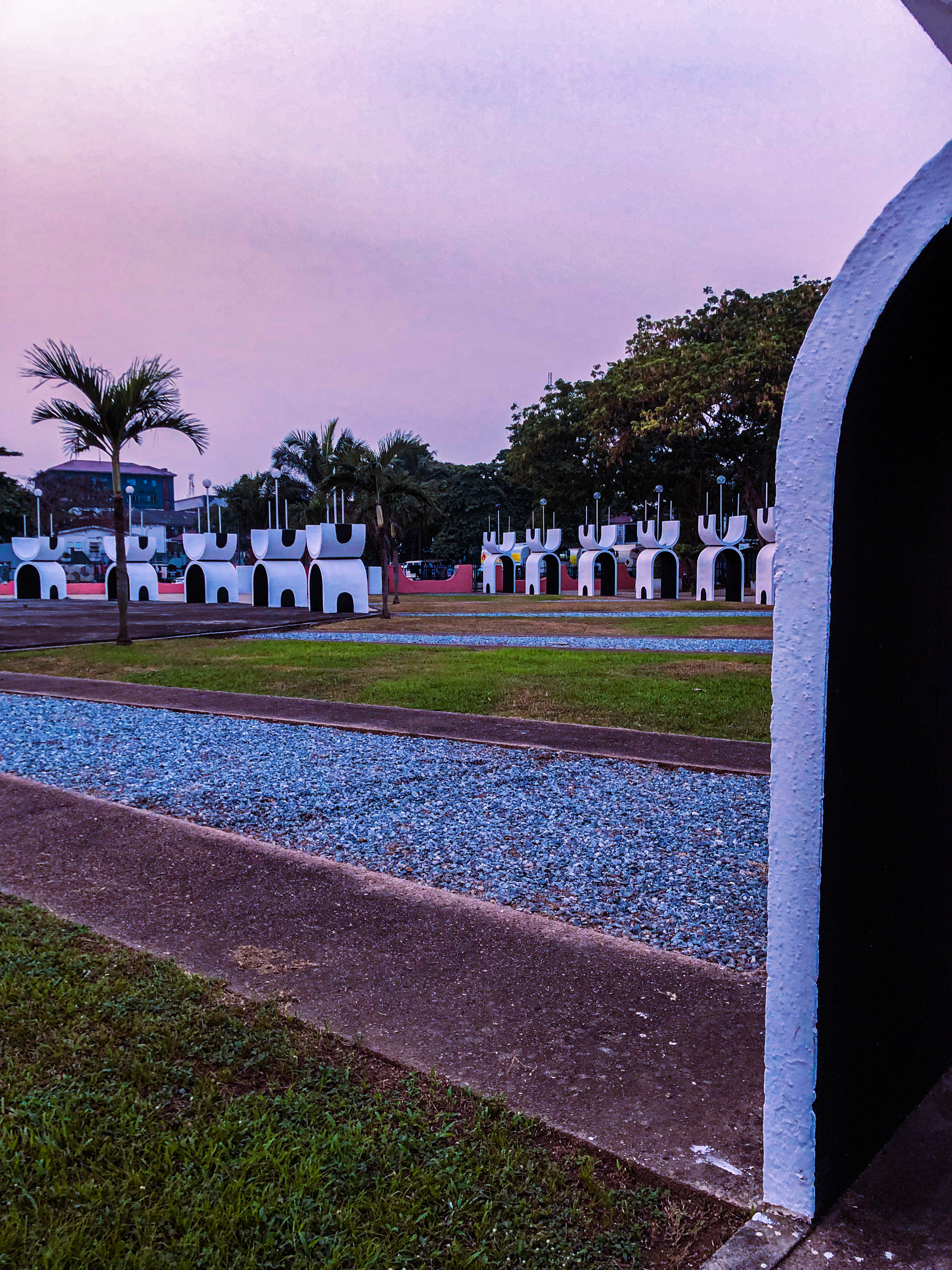

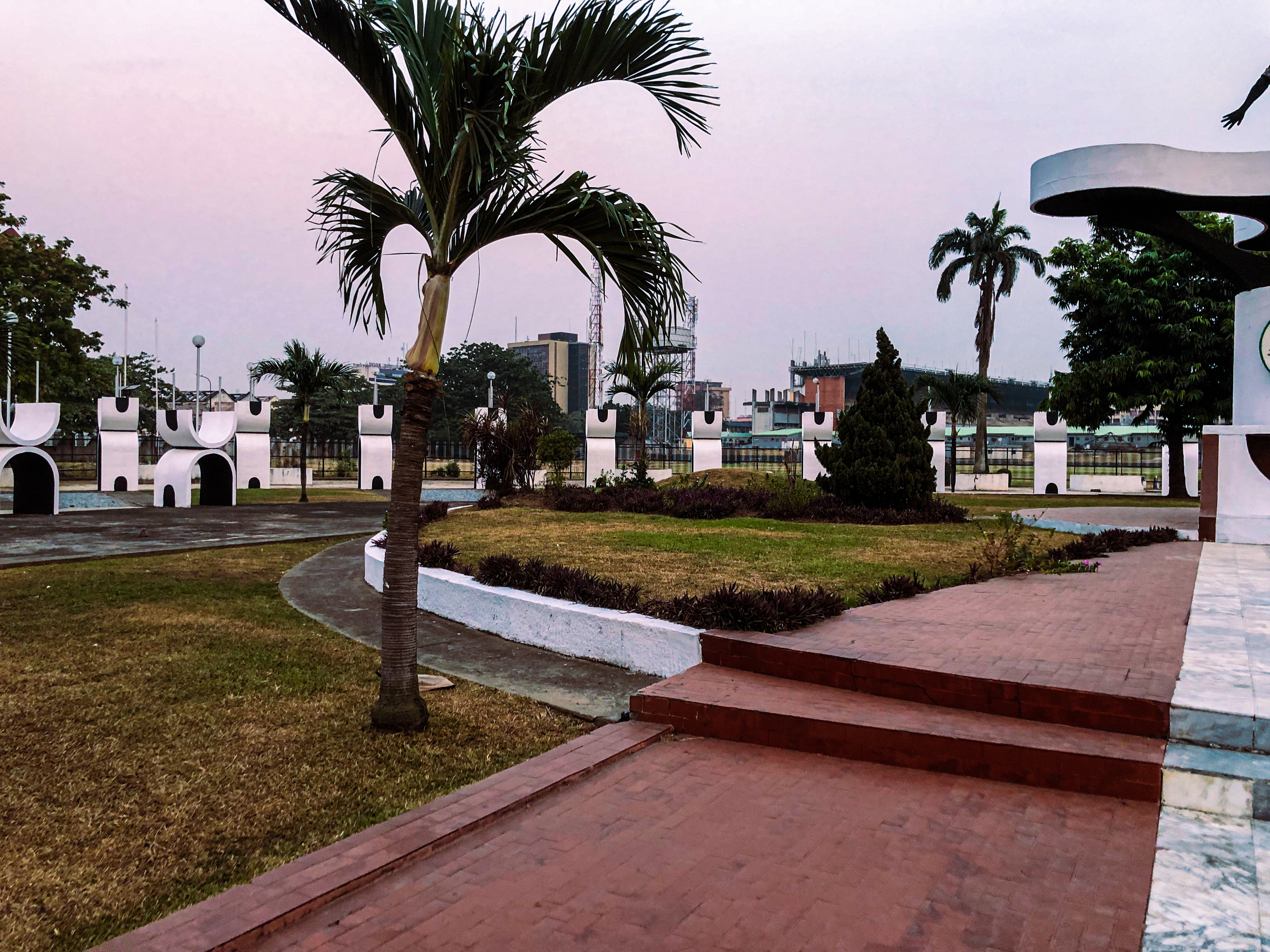

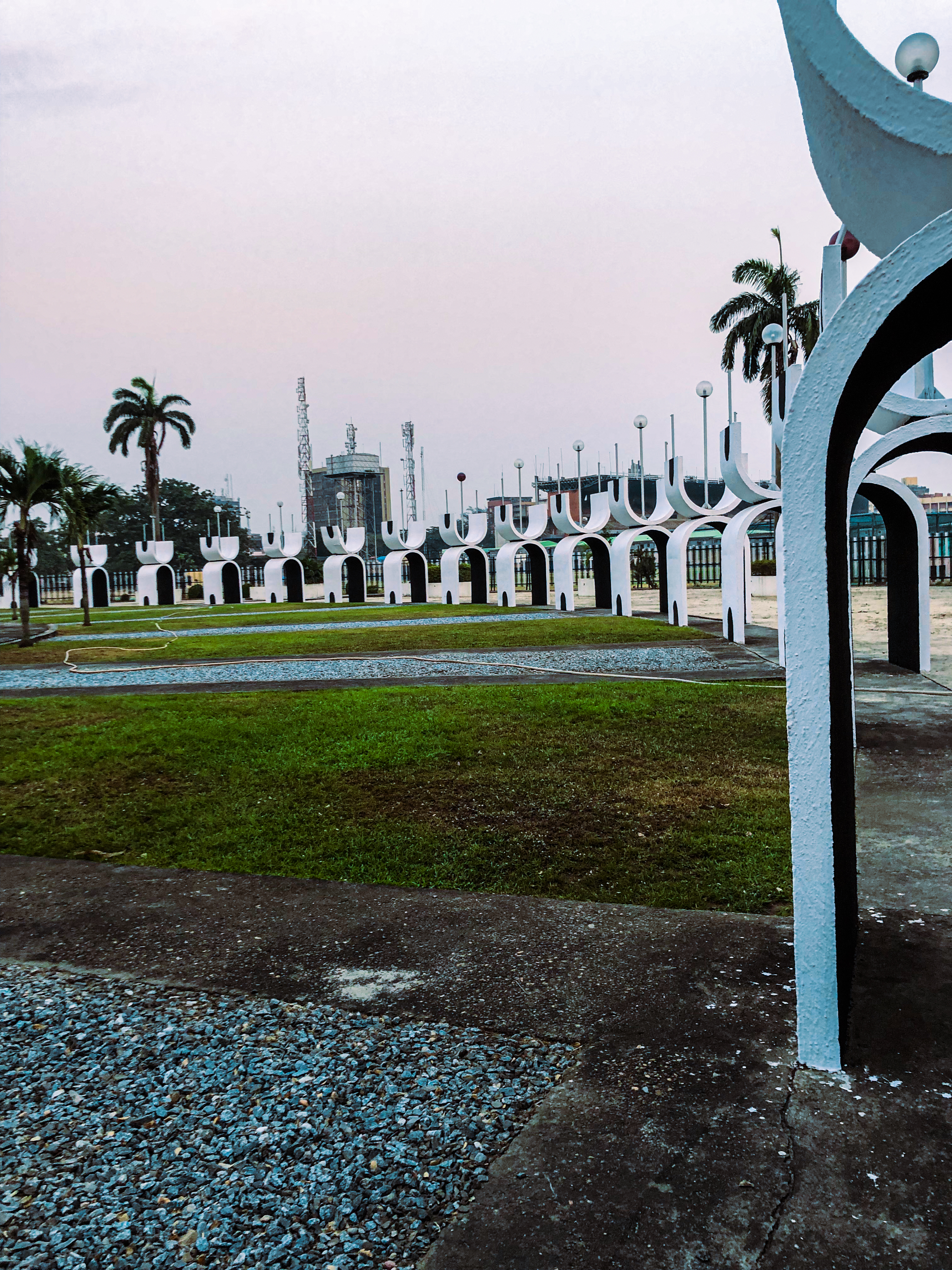

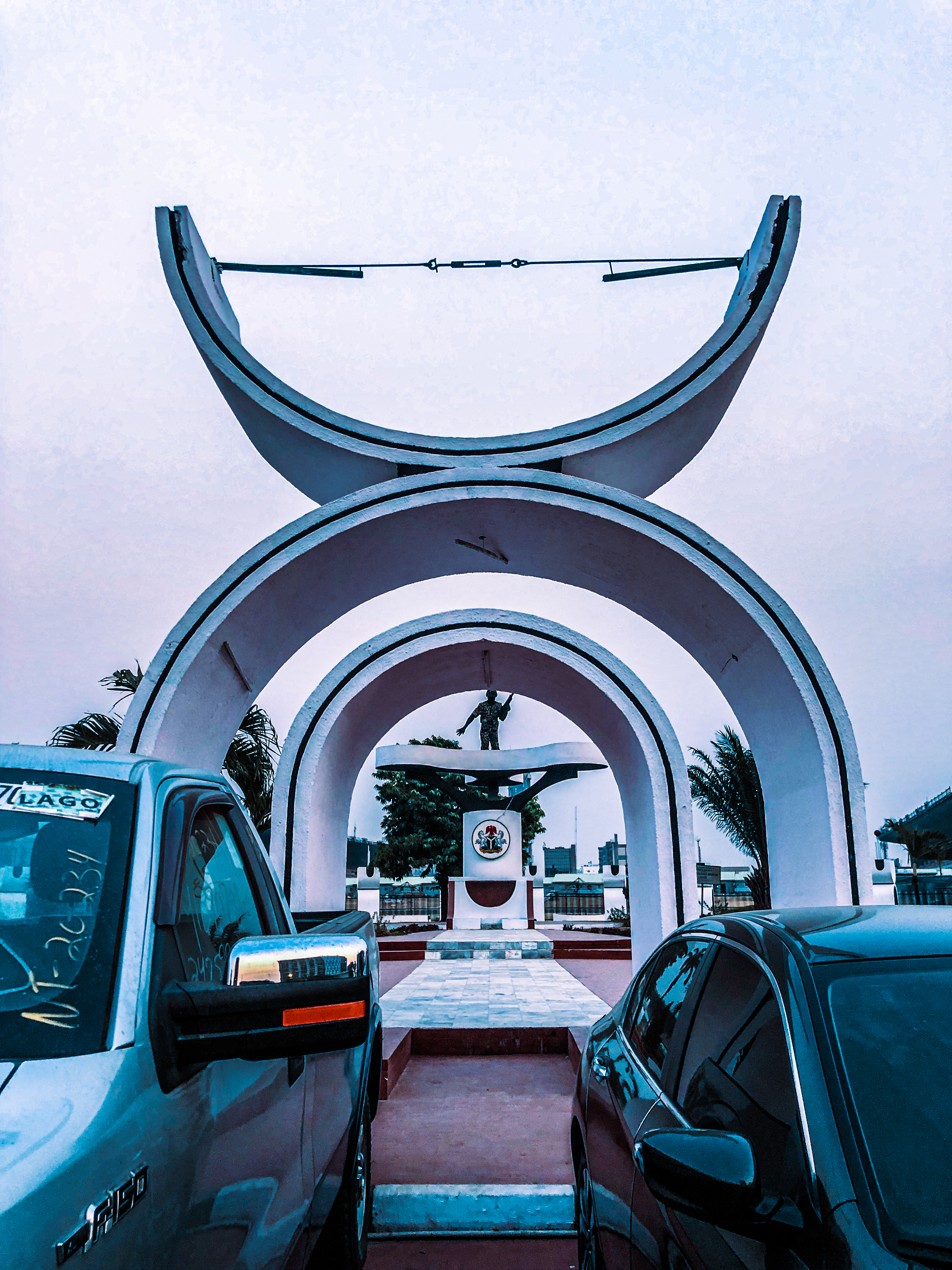

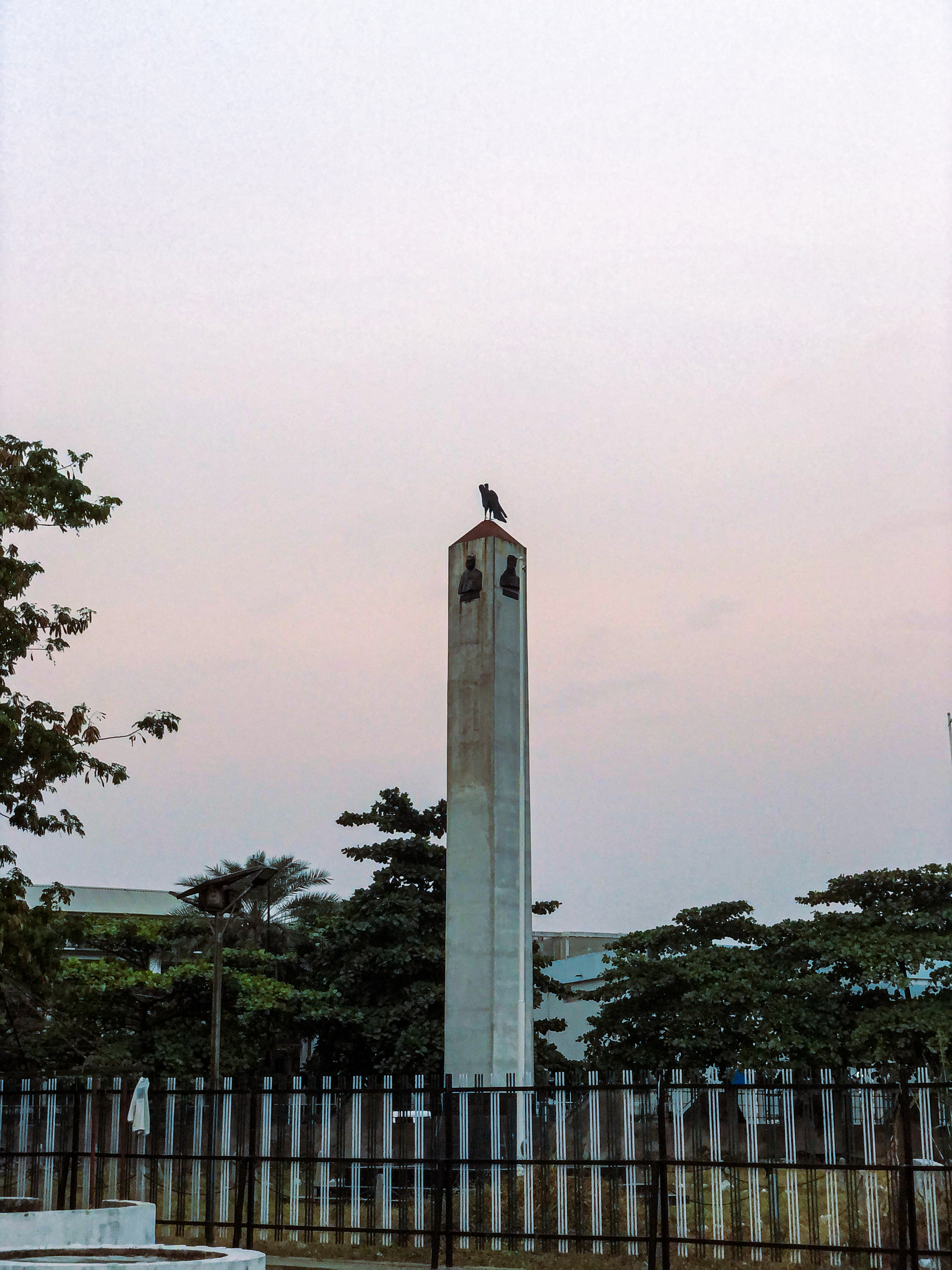
