= 2024 Women's T20I Pacific Cup =

International cricket tournament

2024 Women's Pacific Cup
- Dates: 17 – 21 January 2024
- Administrator: New Zealand Cricket
- Cricket format: Twenty20 International (Note: Matches involving New Zealand Māori did not have T20I status.)
- Tournament format(s): Round-robin and play-offs
- Host: New Zealand
- Champions: Papua New Guinea (2nd title)
- Runners-up: New Zealand Māori
- Participants: 6
- Matches: 18
- Player of the series: (Vanuatu) Rachel Andrew
- Most runs: (Vanuatu) Rachel Andrew (227)
- Most wickets: (Vanuatu) Selina Solman (13)

The 2024 Women's T20I Pacific Cup (known as the South Seas Pacific Cup for sponsorship reasons) was the second edition of the Women's T20I Pacific Cup, a Twenty20 International (T20I) cricket tournament. It took place in Auckland, New Zealand, from 17 to 21 January 2024. The participants were the women's national sides of Cook Islands, Fiji, Papua New Guinea, Samoa, and Vanuatu, as well as a New Zealand Māori team.

The Cook Islands and New Zealand Māori competed in the women's Pacific Cup for the first time, with it being the first tournament for the Māori women's team and the first time that a senior Māori side had competed in an international event since the men's team at the 2001 Pacific Cup. All matches were played at Lloyd Elsmore Park (the final was originally to be played on the outer oval at Eden Park).

Papua New Guinea were the defending champions, having won the previous edition of the tournament, which was played in Vanuatu in October 2022.

The Cook Islands played warm-up matches against Auckland University Cricket Club and Kumeu Cricket Club. The Papua New Guinea squad held a pre-tournament training camp in Napier.

The tournament was broadcast live on TVNZ, New Zealand Cricket's YouTube channel and Sky Pacific. Papua New Guinea retained the trophy after defeating the New Zealand Māori in the final. Vanuatu defeated Samoa in the third place play-off, and their all-rounder Rachel Andrew was named as player of the tournament. Cook Islands won the fifth place play-off against Fiji.

== Squads ==
Cook Islands	Fiji	New Zealand Māori	Papua New Guinea	Samoa	Vanuatu
Tetiare Mataora (c); Rachael Auora; Mummy Elikana; Taiora Elikana; Ioane Evangelean; Zamera Ikiua (vc); Tailor Maika; Tracy Marurai; Maya Piakura; Tapuaiva Piakura; Sofia Samuels; Sonnia Vaia (wk); Raupa Vila; Esther Williams	Ilisapeci Waqavakatoga (c, wk); Melaia Biu; Maeavhanisi Erasito (wk); Ana Gonerara; Ateca Kainoco; Silvia Kijiana; Cilia Lewatu; Lagakali Lomani; Akosita Poulter; Marica Ratuki (wk); Mereani Rodan; Saimoni Tuitoga; Karalaini Vakuruivalu; Mele Waqanisau	Kerry-Anne Tomlinson (c) (Note: Samantha Curtis captained New Zealand Māori in their third match of the tournament and Jess McFadyen captained the team in their fourth and fifth matches.); Skye Bowden (vc); Jess McFadyen (vc, wk); Dayle Anderson; Georgia Atkinson; Nicole Baird; Ocean Bartlett; Jessica Benge; Eden Carson; Olivia Clark; Claire Crooks; Samantha Curtis; Harriett Cuttance; Marama Downes; Mollie Drumm; Mereana Hyde; Caitlin King; Macy Lyford; Sam Mackinder (wk); Emma Parker; Jessica Smith; Anika Todd; Holly Topp (wk)	Brenda Tau (c, wk); Sibona Jimmy (vc); Vicky Araa; Kaia Arua; Vicky Buruka; Kevau Frank (wk); Dika Lohia; Erani Pokana; Tanya Ruma; Pauke Siaka; Henao Thomas; Geua Tom (wk); Isabel Toua; Naoani Vare	Regina Lili'i (c); Carol Agafili; Ailaoa Aoina; Luella Bracey; Tualili Iosefo; Olive Lefaga; Leitu Leong; Jane Manase; Avetia Mapu; Francesca Nafanua (wk); Norah Salima; Jacinta Sanele; Tuaolao Semau; Fa'aiuga Sisifo; Lagi Telea; Eleni Vaaetasi	Selina Solman (c); Alvina Chilia (vc); Rachel Andrew; Maiyllise Carlot (wk); Gillian Chilia; Leimauri Chilia; Lizzing Enoch; Melissa Fare; Natalia Kakor; Valenta Langiatu; Vicky Mansale; Nasimana Navaika; Rayline Ova; Mahina Tarimiala (wk); Vanessa Vira

== Group stage ==
=== Points table ===
Pos	Team	Pld	W	L	T	NR	Pts	NRR	Qualification
1	New Zealand Māori	5	5	0	0	0	10	2.486	Advanced to the final
2	Papua New Guinea	5	4	1	0	0	8	3.065	Advanced to the final
3	Samoa	5	3	2	0	0	6	−0.956	Advanced to the 3rd place play-off
4	Vanuatu	5	2	3	0	0	4	2.218	Advanced to the 3rd place play-off
5	Cook Islands	5	1	4	0	0	2	−2.896	Advanced to the 5th place play-off
6	Fiji	5	0	5	0	0	0	−4.226	Advanced to the 5th place play-off

Source: ESPNcricinfo

=== Fixtures ===
17 January 2024
10:30
Scorecard

Papua New Guinea; 80/9 (20 overs)	v	New Zealand Māori; 81/3 (16.2 overs)
Kaia Arua 22 (37); Eden Carson 2/8 (4 overs)		Jess McFadyen 29 (34); Isabel Toua 1/17 (4 overs)

New Zealand Māori won by 7 wickets
Lloyd Elsmore Park 1, Auckland
Umpires: Merielle Kenni (Van) and Ben Peverall (Eng)

- New Zealand Māori won the toss and elected to field.

17 January 2024
10:30
Scorecard

Samoa; 109/9 (20 overs)	v	Cook Islands; 108/9 (20 overs)
Regina Lili'i 35 (39); Sofia Samuels 3/19 (4 overs)		Zamera Ikiua 43* (46); Ailaoa Aoina 3/18 (4 overs)

Samoa won by 1 run
Lloyd Elsmore Park 2, Auckland
Umpires: Munjal Contrator (NZ) and Ruci Muriyalo (Fij)

- Cook Islands won the toss and elected to field.
- Rachael Auora, Taiora Elikana, Zamera Ikiua, Tetiare Mataora, Raupa Vila, Esther Williams (Cok), Avetia Mapu and Francesca Nafanua (Sam) all made their T20I debuts.

17 January 2024
10:30
Scorecard

Vanuatu; 169/7 (20 overs)	v	Fiji; 34 (9.1 overs)
Valenta Langiatu 61 (45); Mele Waqanisau 1/28 (4 overs)		Ateca Kainoco 5 (5); Melissa Fare 2/5 (1 over)

Vanuatu won by 135 runs
Lloyd Elsmore Park 3, Auckland
Umpires: Kieran Paterson (NZ) and Kalala Tanuvasa (Sam)

- Fiji won the toss and elected to field.
- Silvia Kijiana and Mele Waqanisau (Fij) both made their T20I debuts.

17 January 2024
15:00
Scorecard

Fiji; 69 (14 overs)	v	Cook Islands; 70/1 (8.2 overs)
Mereani Rodan 22 (29); Sofia Samuels 2/8 (2 overs)		Zamera Ikiua 41* (32); Ilisapeci Waqavakatoga 1/20 (2 overs)

Cook Islands won by 9 wickets
Lloyd Elsmore Park 1, Auckland
Umpires: Merielle Kenni (Van) and Ben Peverall (Eng)

- Cook Islands won the toss and elected to field.
- Akosita Poulter (Fij) made her T20I debut.

17 January 2024
15:00
Scorecard

Vanuatu; 91/9 (20 overs)	v	New Zealand Māori; 92/5 (19.4 overs)
Rachel Andrew 20 (14); Ocean Bartlett 4/14 (4 overs)		Jess McFadyen 35 (42); Rachel Andrew 2/13 (4 overs)

New Zealand Māori won by 5 wickets
Lloyd Elsmore Park 2, Auckland
Umpires: Munjal Contrator (NZ) and Kalala Tanuvasa (Sam)

- New Zealand Māori won the toss and elected to field.

17 January 2024
15:00
Scorecard

Samoa; 64 (17.5 overs)	v	Papua New Guinea; 65/0 (8 overs)
Regina Lili'i 18 (35); Kaia Arua 4/11 (2.5 overs)		Naoani Vare 34* (28)

Papua New Guinea won by 10 wickets
Lloyd Elsmore Park 3, Auckland
Umpires: Kieran Paterson (NZ) and Kalala Tanuvasa (Sam)

- Samoa won the toss and elected to bat.
- Carol Agafili (Sam) made her T20I debut.

18 January 2024
15:00
Scorecard

Vanuatu; 95/9 (20 overs)	v	Samoa; 99/7 (19 overs)
Rachel Andrew 42 (42); Lagi Telea 4/16 (4 overs)		Fa'aiuga Sisifo 30 (33); Selina Solman 2/17 (4 overs); Vicky Mansale 2/17 (4 overs)

Samoa won by 3 wickets
Lloyd Elsmore Park 1, Auckland
Umpires: Ruci Muriyalo (Fij) and Tina Semmens (NZ)

- Samoa won the toss and elected to field.
- Jane Manase (Sam) and Natalia Kakor (Van) both made their T20I debuts.

18 January 2024
15:00
Scorecard

Papua New Guinea; 178/4 (20 overs)	v	Cook Islands; 50 (16.2 overs)
Naoani Vare 54 (43); Zamera Ikiua 3/23 (4 overs)		Raupa Vila 23 (31); Vicky Araa 4/6 (4 overs)

Papua New Guinea won by 128 runs
Lloyd Elsmore Park 2, Auckland
Umpires: Merielle Kenni (Van) and Ben Peverall (Eng)

- Cook Islands won the toss and elected to field.
- Dika Lohia (PNG) made her T20I debut.

18 January 2024
15:00
Scorecard

New Zealand Māori; 154/5 (20 overs)	v	Fiji; 87/7 (20 overs)
Jess Smith 36 (37); Mele Waqanisau 2/29 (4 overs)		Melaia Biu 19 (34); Emma Parker 2/8 (4 overs)

New Zealand Māori won by 67 runs
Lloyd Elsmore Park 3, Auckland
Umpires: Munjal Contrator (NZ) and Kalala Tanuvasa (Sam)

- Fiji won the toss and elected to field.

19 January 2024
10:30
Scorecard

Papua New Guinea; 102/4 (20 overs)	v	Vanuatu; 79/3 (20 overs)
Tanya Ruma 50* (52); Selina Solman 3/22 (4 overs)		Rachel Andrew 35 (50); Kaia Arua 2/15 (4 overs)

Papua New Guinea won by 23 runs
Lloyd Elsmore Park 1, Auckland
Umpires: Kieran Paterson (NZ) and Kalala Tanuvasa (Sam)

- Vanuatu won the toss and elected to field.

19 January 2024
10:30
Scorecard

Samoa; 115/7 (20 overs)	v	Fiji; 89 (19.1 overs)
Taalili Iosefo 41* (37); Mele Waqanisau 2/25 (4 overs)		Ateca Kainoco 14 (20); Jacinta Sanele 2/9 (3.1 overs)

Samoa won by 26 runs
Lloyd Elsmore Park 2, Auckland
Umpires: Merielle Kenni (Van) and Craig Pryor (NZ)

- Fiji won the toss and elected to field.

19 January 2024
10:30
Scorecard

Cook Islands; 62/9 (20 overs)	v	New Zealand Māori; 63/1 (7.2 overs)
Taiora Elikana 18 (23); Mollie Drumm 5/10 (4 overs)		Jessica Smith 28* (24); Rachael Auora 1/26 (3 overs)

New Zealand Māori won by 9 wickets
Lloyd Elsmore Park 3, Auckland
Umpires: Ruci Muriyalo (Fij) and Ben Peverall (Eng)

- New Zealand Māori won the toss and elected to field.

19 January 2024
15:00
Scorecard

Vanuatu; 177/1 (20 overs)	v	Cook Islands; 57/9 (20 overs)
Rachel Andrew 106* (68); Sofia Samuels1/20 (4 overs)		Tailor Maika 15* (23); Selina Solman 5/9 (4 overs)

Vanuatu won by 120 runs
Lloyd Elsmore Park 1, Auckland
Umpires: Kieran Paterson (NZ) and Kalala Tanuvasa (Sam)

- Cook Islands won the toss and elected to field.
- Ioane Evangelean (Cok) made her T20I debut.
- Rachel Andrew became the first player for Vanuatu to score a century in women's T20Is.
- Selina Solman became the first player for Vanuatu to take a five-wicket haul in women's T20Is.

19 January 2024
15:00
Scorecard

Samoa; 74/7 (20 overs)	v	New Zealand Māori; 78/5 (9.3 overs)
Regina Lili'i 30 (49); Nicole Baird 2/10 (3 overs)		Marama Downes 19 (19); Taalili Iosefo 2/11 (2 overs)

New Zealand Māori won by 5 wickets
Lloyd Elsmore Park 2, Auckland
Umpires: Ruci Muriyalo (Fij) and Craig Pryor (NZ)

- Samoa won the toss and elected to bat.

19 January 2024
15:00
Scorecard

Fiji; 44 (20 overs)	v	Papua New Guinea; 45/1 (5.5 overs)
Karalaini Vakuruivalu 9* (20); Isabel Toua 4/6 (4 overs)		Tanya Ruma 20* (11); Mereani Rodan 1/7 (1 over)

Papua New Guinea won by 9 wickets
Lloyd Elsmore Park 3, Auckland
Umpires: Merielle Kenni (Van) and Ben Peverall (Eng)

- Fiji won the toss and elected to bat.

== Play-offs ==
=== 5th place play-off ===
21 January 2024
10:30
Scorecard

Fiji; 80/7 (20 overs)	v	Cook Islands; 81/1 (14.1 overs)
Ilisapeci Waqavakatoga 25 (38); Sofia Samuels 2/2 (4 overs)		Zamera Ikiua 29* (46); Karalaini Vakuruivalu 1/12 (2 overs)

Cook Islands won by 9 wickets
Lloyd Elsmore Park 3, Auckland
Umpires: Ruci Muriyalo (Fij) and Kalala Tanuvasa (Sam)

- Cook Islands won the toss and elected to field.

=== 3rd place play-off ===
21 January 2024
10:30
Scorecard

Vanuatu; 157/7 (20 overs)	v	Samoa; 134 (19.2 overs)
Valenta Langiatu 34 (30); Lagi Telea 3/15 (4 overs)		Regina Lili'i 43 (44); Nasimana Navaika 2/23 (4 overs)

Vanuatu won by 23 runs
Lloyd Elsmore Park 2, Auckland
Umpires: Marise-Ann Fernandes (NZ) and Moth Sutherland-Tupp (NZ)

- Samoa won the toss and elected to field.

=== Final ===
21 January 2024
15:00
Scorecard

New Zealand Māori; 87 (20 overs)	v	Papua New Guinea; 88/5 (18.3 overs)
Skye Bowden 23 (26); Sibona Jimmy 5/10 (4 overs)		Sibona Jimmy 25 (27); Georgia Atkinson 2/6 (2 overs)

Papua New Guinea won by 5 wickets
Lloyd Elsmore Park 1, Auckland
Umpires: Merielle Kenni (Van) and Ben Peverall (Eng)

- New Zealand Māori won the toss and elected to bat.
- Olivia Clark and Harriett Cuttance (New Zealand Māori) both made their T20 debuts.
- Sibona Jimmy (PNG) took her first five-wicket haul in T20s.
