= 2022 Women's T20I Pacific Cup =

International cricket tournament

2022 Women's Pacific Cup
- Dates: 3 – 6 October 2022
- Administrator: Vanuatu Cricket Association
- Cricket format: Women's Twenty20 International
- Tournament format: Double round-robin
- Host: Vanuatu
- Champions: Papua New Guinea (1st title)
- Runners-up: Vanuatu
- Participants: 4
- Matches: 12
- Player of the series: (Papua New Guinea) Naoani Vare
- Most runs: (Papua New Guinea) Naoani Vare (225)
- Most wickets: (Papua New Guinea) Isabel Toua (11)

The 2022 Women's T20I Pacific Cup was a women's Twenty20 International (WT20I) cricket tournament that took place in Port Vila, Vanuatu, from 3 to 6 October 2022. It was the inaugural edition of the Women's T20I Pacific Cup. The participants were the women's national sides of Vanuatu, Fiji, Papua New Guinea and Samoa. Papua New Guinea had entered the event after recently competing in the 2022 ICC Women's T20 World Cup Qualifier in Abu Dhabi, but the other three teams had not played an international fixture since the Pacific Games cricket tournament in July 2019.

Papua New Guinea and Vanuatu each won both of their matches on the opening day of the tournament. Papua New Guinea again won twice on the second day of the event, while Samoa avenged their opening day loss to the hosts by picking up two wins on the day. A 10-wicket win against Samoa on the final day saw Papua New Guinea secure top spot in the table, before the last two games were abandoned due to rain.

== Squads ==
Fiji	Papua New Guinea	Samoa	Vanuatu
Ruci Muriyalo (c); Ilisapeci Waqavakatoga (vc, wk); Kiera Amoe; Melaia Biu; Takayawa Colati; Maeavhanisi Erasito (wk); Ana Gonerara; Ateca Kainoco; Lagakali Lomani; Volau Mataki; Elizabeth Rokoro; Olivia Sekilekutu; Karalaini Vakuruivalu; Sulia Vuni	Kaia Arua (c); Tanya Ruma (vc); Melanie Ani; Vicky Araa; Hollan Doriga; Kevau Frank; Sibona Jimmy; Ravina Oa; Pauke Siaka; Brenda Tau (wk); Henao Thomas; Geua Tom (wk); Mairi Tom; Isabel Toua; Naoani Vare	Kolotita Nonu (c); Lagi Telea (vc); Florence Agaimalo; Ailaoa Aoina; Leofao Apolinasio; Taalili Iosefo; Ariota Kupito; Taofi Lafai; Sarina Moe; Jacinta Sanele; Tuaoloa Semau; Vanisi Talalelei; Kalala Tanuvasa (wk); Eleni Vaaetasi	Selina Solman (c); Rachel Andrew; Maiyllise Carlot (wk); Alvina Chilia; Netty Chilia; Lizzing Enoch; Leisau Jacob; Ruth Kaltongga; Valenta Langiatu; Theresa Mansale; Vicky Mansale; Nasimana Navaika; Rayline Ova; Leimura Tastuki

== Points Table ==
Pos	Team	Pld	W	L	NR	Pts	NRR
1	Papua New Guinea	6	5	0	1	11	6.229
2	Vanuatu	6	3	2	1	7	0.893
3	Samoa	6	2	3	1	5	−0.601
4	Fiji	6	0	5	1	1	−5.190

Source: ESPNcricinfo

== Fixtures ==
3 October 2022
09:30
Scorecard

Vanuatu; 136/8 (20 overs)	v	Samoa; 115 (19.1 overs)
Valenta Langiatu 53 (43); Jacinta Sanele 4/34 (4 overs)		Florence Agaimalo 21* (11); Nasimana Navaika 4/22 (4 overs)

Vanuatu won by 21 runs
Vanuatu Cricket Ground, Port Vila
Umpires: Junior Kaltapau (Van) and Merielle Kenni (Van)
Player of the match: Valenta Langiatu (Van)

- Vanuatu won the toss and elected to bat.
- Netty Chilia, Ruth Kaltongga, Rayline Ova (Van), Florence Agaimalo, Ailaoa Aoina, Leofao Apolinasio, Jacinta Sanele, Tuaoloa Semau and Eleni Vaaetasi (Sam) all made their WT20I debuts.

3 October 2022
09:30
Scorecard

Papua New Guinea; 219/5 (20 overs)	v	Fiji; 41 (9.4 overs)
Tanya Ruma 67 (39); Karalaini Vakuruivalu 3/39 (4 overs)		Ilisapeci Waqavakatoga 26 (20); Hollan Doriga 5/2 (1.4 overs)

Papua New Guinea won by 178 runs
Vanuatu Cricket Ground (Oval 2), Port Vila
Umpires: Pierre Chilia (Van) and Mac Markia (Van)
Player of the match: Hollan Doriga (PNG)

- Papua New Guinea won the toss and elected to bat.
- Kiera Amoe, Melaia Biu, Takayawa Colati, Maeavhanisi Erasito, Ateca Kainoco, Lagakali Lomani, Olivia Sekilekutu, Karalaini Vakuruivalu and Sulia Vuni (Fij) all made their WT20I debuts.
- Hollan Doriga (PNG) took her first five-wicket haul in WT20Is.

3 October 2022
13:30
Scorecard

Vanuatu; 172/6 (20 overs)	v	Fiji; 94 (19.5 overs)
Selina Solman 39 (29); Ruci Muriyalo 1/24 (4 overs)		Ilisapeci Waqavakatoga 24 (21); Rachel Andrew 2/12 (4 overs)

Vanuatu won by 78 runs
Vanuatu Cricket Ground, Port Vila
Umpires: Pierre Chilia (Van) and Junior Kaltapau (Van)
Player of the match: Selina Solman (Van)

- Vanuatu won the toss and elected to bat.
- Ana Gonerara, Volau Mataki and Elizabeth Rokoro (Fij) all made their WT20I debuts.

3 October 2022
13:30
Scorecard

Samoa; 79 (19.1 overs)	v	Papua New Guinea; 83/2 (9.4 overs)
Taalili Iosefo 12 (19); Geua Tom 2/11 (3 overs)		Naoani Vare 28* (24); Eleni Vaaetasi 1/8 (1 over)

Papua New Guinea won by 8 wickets
Vanuatu Cricket Ground (Oval 2), Port Vila
Umpires: Mac Markia (Van) and Ronald Tari (Van)
Player of the match: Naoani Vare (PNG)

- Samoa won the toss and elected to bat.

5 October 2022
09:30
Scorecard

Samoa; 140/7 (20 overs)	v	Fiji; 65 (13.5 overs)
Taalili Iosefo 31 (16); Ilisapeci Waqavakatoga 2/30 (3 overs)		Ruci Muriyalo 27 (28); Ailaoa Aoina 4/9 (1.5 overs)

Samoa won by 75 runs
Vanuatu Cricket Ground, Port Vila
Umpires: Mac Markia (Van) and Ronald Tari (Van)
Player of the match: Ailaoa Aoina (Sam)

- Fiji won the toss and elected to field.
- Ariota Kupito (Sam) made her WT20I debut.

5 October 2022
09:30
Scorecard

Vanuatu; 114/9 (20 overs)	v	Papua New Guinea; 115/2 (13.3 overs)
Rachel Andrew 50 (40); Kaia Arua 5/11 (4 overs)		Naoani Vare 39* (34); Alvina Chilia 1/6 (1.3 overs)

Papua New Guinea won by 8 wickets
Vanuatu Cricket Ground (Oval 2), Port Vila
Umpires: Pierre Chilia (Van) and Merielle Kenni (Van)
Player of the match: Kaia Arua (PNG)

- Vanuatu won the toss and elected to bat.

5 October 2022
13:30
Scorecard

Papua New Guinea; 187/3 (20 overs)	v	Fiji; 63 (14.5 overs)
Naoani Vare 88* (58); Ruci Muriyalo 1/18 (2 overs)		Ilisapeci Waqavakatoga 24 (34); Henao Thomas 5/13 (3.5 overs)

Papua New Guinea won by 124 runs
Vanuatu Cricket Ground, Port Vila
Umpires: Mac Markia (Van) and Ronald Tari (Van)
Player of the match: Naoani Vare (PNG)

- Fiji won the toss and elected to field.
- Henao Thomas (PNG) took her first five-wicket haul in WT20Is.

5 October 2022
13:30
Scorecard

Vanuatu; 69 (14.2 overs)	v	Samoa; 70/4 (13.3 overs)
Maiyllise Carlot 15 (17); Lagi Telea 3/11 (3 overs)		Tuaoloa Semau 16* (11); Alvina Chilia 2/27 (4 overs)

Samoa won by 6 wickets
Vanuatu Cricket Ground (Oval 2), Port Vila
Umpires: Junior Kaltapau (Van) and Pierre Chilia (Van)
Player of the match: Taofi Lafai (Sam)

- Vanuatu won the toss and elected to bat.
- Leisau Jacob and Theresa Mansale (Van) both made their WT20I debuts.

6 October 2022
09:30
Scorecard

Samoa; 49 (16.3 overs)	v	Papua New Guinea; 50/0 (4.2 overs)
Taofi Lafai 8 (17); Isabel Toua 3/7 (4 overs)		Naoani Vare 25* (16)

Papua New Guinea won by 10 wickets
Vanuatu Cricket Ground, Port Vila
Umpires: Pierre Chilia (Van) and Merielle Kenni (Van)
Player of the match: Isabel Toua (PNG)

- Samoa won the toss and elected to bat.
- Sarina Moe (Sam) made her WT20I debut.

6 October 2022
09:30
Scorecard

Vanuatu; 150/6 (20 overs)	v	Fiji; 86/9 (20 overs)
Valenta Langiatu 55 (49); Karalaini Vakuruivalu 2/33 (4 overs)		Ilisapeci Waqavakatoga 20 (40); Nasimana Navaika 3/13 (4 overs)

Vanuatu won by 64 runs
Vanuatu Cricket Ground (Oval 2), Port Vila
Umpires: Junior Kaltapau (Van) and Mac Markia (Van)
Player of the match: Valenta Langiatu (Van)

- Fiji won the toss and elected to field.
- Lizzing Enoch (Van) made her WT20I debut.

6 October 2022
13:30
Scorecard

Papua New Guinea; 154/4 (18.4 overs)	v	Vanuatu
Tanya Ruma 48 (41); Selina Solman 1/26 (4 overs)

No result
Vanuatu Cricket Ground, Port Vila
Umpires: Pierre Chilia (Van) and Merielle Kenni (Van)

- Vanuatu won the toss and elected to field.
- No further play was possible due to rain.

6 October 2022
13:30
Scorecard

Samoa; 120/2 (17 overs)	v	Fiji
Kolotita Nonu 57* (54); Ana Gonerara 2/18 (3 overs)

No result
Vanuatu Cricket Ground (Oval 2), Port Vila
Umpires: Junior Kaltapau (Van) and Ronald Tari (Van)

- Samoa won the toss and elected to bat.
- No further play was possible due to rain.
