= 2023 Women's T20 World Cup EAP Qualifier =

International cricket tournament

2023 ICC Women's T20 World Cup East Asia-Pacific Qualifier
- Dates: 1 – 8 September 2023
- Administrator: ICC East Asia-Pacific
- Cricket format: Twenty20 International
- Tournament format: Round-robin
- Host: Vanuatu
- Champions: Vanuatu
- Runners-up: Papua New Guinea
- Participants: 7
- Matches: 21
- Player of the series: (Vanuatu) Rachel Andrew
- Most runs: (Vanuatu) Rachel Andrew (151)
- Most wickets: (Vanuatu) Vanessa Vira (11)

The 2023 ICC Women's T20 World Cup East Asia-Pacific Qualifier was a cricket tournament that formed part of the qualification process for the 2024 ICC Women's T20 World Cup. The East Asia-Pacific qualifier tournament was hosted at the Vanuatu Cricket Ground from 1 to 8 September 2023, and the top team in the tournament progressed to the 2024 ICC Women's T20 World Cup Qualifier. The tournament was played as a single round-robin, featuring the national teams of Vanuatu, Cook Islands, Fiji, Indonesia, Japan, Papua New Guinea and Samoa.

Ahead of the qualifier, hosts Vanuatu played a two-match Twenty20 International (T20I) series against Japan at the same venue. Vanuatu won the series 2–0.

Vanuatu progressed to the global qualifier by remaining unbeaten throughout the tournament. Vanuatu all-rounder Rachel Andrew was named player of the tournament and batter of the tournament, while her teammate 16-year-old Vanessa Vira was named bowler of the tournament.

== Squads ==
Cook Islands	Fiji	Indonesia	Japan	Papua New Guinea	Samoa	Vanuatu
June George (c); Marii Kaukura (vc); Zamera Ikiua; Daena Kataina (wk); Punanga Kaveao; Tailor Maika; Phillica Maruariki; Tina Mato; Koitai Mataora (wk); Maya Piakura; Tapuaiva Piakura; Sofia Samuels; Teraimateata Touna; Sonnia Vaia	Ilisapeci Waqavakatoga (c, wk); Ruci Muriyalo (vc); Kiera Amoe; Melaia Biu; Maeavhanisi Erasito (wk); Ana Gonerara; Ateca Kainoco; Cilia Lewatu; Lagakali Lomani; Marica Ratuki (wk); Mereani Rodan; Serafina Sigaiwasa; Teresia Talemaitoga; Karalaini Vakuruivalu; Sulia Vuni	Ni Wayan Sariani (c, wk); Andriani (wk); Mia Arda; Ni Ariani; Maria Corazon (wk); Ni Luh Dewi; Kisi Kasse; Sang Maypriani; Rahmawati Pangestuti; Kadek Winda Prastini; Lie Qiao; Ni Kadek Fitria Rada Rani; Ni Putu Ayu Nanda Sakarini (wk); Ni Made Putri Suwandewi	Mai Yanagida (c); Akari Nishimura (vc, wk); Ahilya Chandel; Ayumi Fujikawa; Hinase Goto; Haruna Iwasaki; Shimako Kato; Elena Kusuda-Nairn; Erika Oda; Kurumi Ota; Seika Sumi; Erika Toguchi-Quinn; Nonoha Yasumoto; Minami Yoshioka (wk)	Kaia Arua (c); Sibona Jimmy (vc); Vicky Araa; Vicky Buruka; Kevau Frank; Tanya Ruma; Pauke Siaka; Brenda Tau (wk); Hane Tau; Henao Thomas; Geua Tom (wk); Isabel Toua; Initia Vagi; Naoani Vare	Taofi Lafai (c); Via Andrew; Ailaoa Aoina; Teinemane Faimalo; Aunoa Iopu; Ruth Johnston (wk); Ariota Kupito; Leitu Leong; Jacinta Sanele; Tuaoloa Semau; Faaiuga Sisifo; Angel Sootaga; Vicky Tafea; Salema Toomaga	Selina Solman (c); Alvina Chilia (vc); Rachel Andrew; Maiyllise Carlot (wk); Leimauri Chilia; Lizzing Enoch; Leisau Jacob; Tina Kalosin; Valenta Langiatu; Vicky Mansale; Nasimana Navaika; Rayline Ova; Mahina Tarimiala (wk); Vanessa Vira

== Vanuatu v Japan series ==
Japan women's cricket team in Vanuatu in 2023
	Vanuatu	Japan
- Dates: 28 – 30 August 2023
Captains	Selina Solman	Mai Yanagida

Twenty20 International series
- Results: Vanuatu won the 2-match series 2–0
Most runs	Rachel Andrew (46)	Ahilya Chandel (29)
Most wickets	Vicky Mansale (5)	Mai Yanagida (2); Nonoha Yasumoto (2)

=== 1st T20I ===
28 August 2023
13:30
Scorecard

Japan; 65 (19.1 overs)	v	Vanuatu; 70/2 (11.3 overs)
Ahilya Chandel 21 (44); Vicky Mansale 3/16 (4 overs)		Rachel Andrew 44* (37); Nonoha Yasumoto 1/14 (3 overs)

Vanuatu won by 8 wickets
Vanuatu Cricket Ground, Port Vila
Umpires: Pierre Chilia (Van) and Zechariah Shem (Van)
Player of the match: Rachel Andrew (Van)

- Vanuatu won the toss and elected to field.
- Vanessa Vira (Van) and Erika Toguchi-Quinn (Jpn) both made their T20I debuts.

=== 2nd T20I ===
30 August 2023
13:30
Scorecard

Vanuatu; 61/5 (10 overs)	v	Japan; 46/8 (10 overs)
Valenta Langiatu 24 (27); Mai Yanagida 2/8 (1 overs)		Akari Nishimura 11 (14); Rachel Andrew 3/7 (2 overs)

Vanuatu won by 15 runs
Vanuatu Cricket Ground, Port Vila
Umpires: Pierre Chilia (Van) and Kerrod Loughman (Van)
Player of the match: Valenta Langiatu (Van)

- Japan won the toss and elected to field.
- The match was reduced to 10 overs per side due to rain.

== Qualifier ==
=== Points table ===
Pos	Team	Pld	W	L	NR	Pts	NRR	Qualification
1	Vanuatu	6	6	0	0	12	2.401	Advanced to the global qualifier
2	Papua New Guinea	6	5	1	0	10	3.623	
3	Indonesia	6	4	2	0	8	1.071	
4	Japan	6	3	3	0	6	−0.036	
5	Samoa	6	1	5	0	2	−2.003	
6	Cook Islands	6	1	5	0	2	−2.199	
7	Fiji	6	1	5	0	2	−2.964	

Source: ESPNcricinfo

=== Fixtures ===
1 September 2023
09:30
Scorecard

Japan; 125/6 (20 overs)	v	Cook Islands; 95/8 (20 overs)
Erika Oda 47 (44); Marii Kaukura 3/24 (4 overs)		Sonnia Vaia 22 (34); Shimako Kato 2/12 (4 overs); Nonoha Yasumoto 2/12 (4 overs)

Japan won by 30 runs
Vanuatu Cricket Ground, Port Vila
Umpires: Kim Cotton (NZ) and Kalala Tanuvasa (Sam)
Player of the match: Erika Oda (Jpn)

- Cook Islands won the toss and elected to field.
- June George, Zamera Ikiua, Daena Kataina, Marii Kaukura, Punanga Kaveao, Tailor Maika, Phillica Maruariki, Koitai Mataora, Tapuaiva Piakura, Sofia Samuels and Sonnia Vaia (Cok) all made their T20I debuts.

1 September 2023
13:30
Scorecard

Fiji; 98/7 (20 overs)	v	Samoa; 80 (17.3 overs)
Ilisapeci Waqavakatoga 43 (53); Teinemane Faimalo 5/8 (3 overs)		Aunoa Iopu 20 (27); Karalaini Vakuruivalu 4/14 (4 overs)

Fiji won by 18 runs
Vanuatu Cricket Ground (Oval 2), Port Vila
Umpires: Merielle Kenni (Van) and Lisa McCabe (Aus)
Player of the match: Ilisapeci Waqavakatoga (Fij)

- Samoa won the toss and elected to field.
- Marica Ratuki, Serafina Sigaiwasa, Teresia Talemaitoga (Fij), Via Andrew, Teinemane Faimalo, Aunoa Iopu and Leitu Leong (Sam) all made their T20I debuts.
- Teinemane Faimalo became the first player for Samoa to take a five-wicket haul in women's T20Is.

1 September 2023
13:30
Scorecard

Papua New Guinea; 89/7 (20 overs)	v	Vanuatu; 93/5 (17.3 overs)
Tanya Ruma 29 (45); Nasimana Navaika 2/14 (3 overs)		Selina Solman 38* (36); Sibona Jimmy 3/19 (4 overs)

Vanuatu won by 5 wickets
Vanuatu Cricket Ground, Port Vila
Umpires: Ashlee Gibbons (Aus) and Kalala Tanuvasa (Sam)
Player of the match: Selina Solman (Van)

- Papua New Guinea won the toss and elected to bat.
- Hane Tau (PNG) made her T20I debut.

2 September 2023
09:30
Scorecard

Papua New Guinea; 167/2 (20 overs)	v	Cook Islands; 67 (19.3 overs)
Naoani Vare 75* (64); Zamera Ikiua 1/13 (4 overs)		Phillica Maruariki 36 (35); Kaia Arua 3/13 (4 overs)

Papua New Guinea won by 100 runs
Vanuatu Cricket Ground, Port Vila
Umpires: Lisa McCabe (Aus) and Claire Polosak (Aus)
Player of the match: Naoani Vare (PNG)

- Cook Islands won the toss and elected to field.
- Teraimateata Touna (Cok), Vicky Buruka and Kevau Frank (PNG) all made their T20I debuts.

2 September 2023
13:30
Scorecard

Japan; 152/3 (20 overs)	v	Samoa; 104/8 (20 overs)
Erika Oda 46 (28); Ailaoa Aoina 2/26 (4 overs)		Ailaoa Aoina 34 (32); Erika Toguchi-Quinn 2/23 (4 overs)

Japan won by 48 runs
Vanuatu Cricket Ground (Oval 2), Port Vila
Umpires: Kim Cotton (NZ) and Ashlee Gibbons (Aus)
Player of the match: Erika Oda (Jpn)

- Samoa won the toss and elected to field.

4 September 2023
09:30
Scorecard

Cook Islands; 55 (15.2 overs)	v	Vanuatu; 56/2 (10.2 overs)
Daena Kataina 14 (26); Vicky Mansale 3/10 (2.2 overs)		Rachel Andrew 35 (36); Punanga Kaveao 1/10 (1.2 overs)

Vanuatu won by 8 wickets
Vanuatu Cricket Ground (Oval 2), Port Vila
Umpires: Kim Cotton (NZ) and Ashlee Gibbons (Aus)
Player of the match: Rachel Andrew (Van)

- Vanuatu won the toss and elected to field.
- Tina Mato (Cok) made her T20I debut.

4 September 2023
09:30
Scorecard

Samoa; 61 (13 overs)	v	Papua New Guinea; 64/1 (7.5 overs)
Jacinta Sanele 12 (20); Sibona Jimmy 4/16 (4 overs)		Naoani Vare 23 (21); Ailaoa Aoina 1/10 (1 over)

Papua New Guinea won by 9 wickets
Vanuatu Cricket Ground, Port Vila
Umpires: Merielle Kenni (Van) and Lisa McCabe (Aus)
Player of the match: Sibona Jimmy (PNG)

- Papua New Guinea won the toss and elected to field.

4 September 2023
13:30
Scorecard

Indonesia; 144/3 (20 overs)	v	Cook Islands; 78/9 (20 overs)
Ni Luh Dewi 56 (46); Marii Kaukura 2/25 (4 overs)		Punanga Kaveao 11 (22); Andriani 4/15 (4 overs)

Indonesia won by 66 runs
Vanuatu Cricket Ground, Port Vila
Umpires: Lisa McCabe (Aus) and Claire Polosak (Aus)
Player of the match: Ni Luh Dewi (Idn)

- Indonesia won the toss and elected to bat.
- Kisi Kasse and Sang Maypriani (Idn) both made their T20I debuts.

4 September 2023
13:30
Scorecard

Fiji; 75/7 (20 overs)	v	Japan; 76/2 (13.3 overs)
Ruci Muriyalo 36* (55); Nonoha Yasumoto 4/11 (4 overs)		Erika Oda 31* (31); Karalaini Vakuruivalu 1/15 (4 overs)

Japan won by 8 wickets
Vanuatu Cricket Ground (Oval 2), Port Vila
Umpires: Merielle Kenni (Van) and Kalala Tanuvasa (Sam)
Player of the match: Nonoha Yasumoto (Jpn)

- Fiji won the toss and elected to bat.

5 September 2023
09:30
Scorecard

Japan; 63/7 (20 overs)	v	Papua New Guinea; 64/1 (8.1 overs)
Kurumi Ota 20* (44); Sibona Jimmy 1/6 (3 overs)		Brenda Tau 23* (21); Ahilya Chandel 1/7 (2 overs)

Papua New Guinea won by 9 wickets
Vanuatu Cricket Ground, Port Vila
Umpires: Kim Cotton (NZ) and Ashlee Gibbons (Aus)
Player of the match: Brenda Tau (PNG)

- Japan won the toss and elected to bat.

5 September 2023
09:30
Scorecard

Fiji; 66 (17.5 overs)	v	Indonesia; 69/0 (11.2)
Ruci Muriyalo 23 (32); Ni Made Putri Suwandewi 2/8 (2 overs)		Ni Luh Dewi 40* (35)

Indonesia won by 10 wickets
Vanuatu Cricket Ground (Oval 2), Port Vila
Umpires: Merielle Kenni (Van) and Claire Polosak (Aus)
Player of the match: Ni Luh Dewi (Idn)

- Indonesia won the toss and elected to field.

5 September 2023
13:30
Scorecard

Vanuatu; 175/5 (20 overs)	v	Fiji; 47 (14.2 overs)
Valenta Langiatu 87* (57); Ateca Kainoco 2/34 (4 overs)		Ateca Kainoco 7 (8); Selina Solman 3/8 (2.2 overs)

Vanuatu won by 128 runs
Vanuatu Cricket Ground, Port Vila
Umpires: Kim Cotton (NZ) and Kalala Tanuvasa (Sam)
Player of the match: Valenta Langiatu (Van)

- Vanuatu won the toss and elected to bat.

5 September 2023
13:30
Scorecard

Samoa; 52 (20 overs)	v	Indonesia; 53/0 (5.1 overs)
Faaiuga Sisifo 18 (33); Andriani 3/2 (4 overs)		Andriani 34* (20)

Indonesia won by 10 wickets
Vanuatu Cricket Ground (Oval 2), Port Vila
Umpires: Lisa McCabe (Aus) and Claire Polosak (Aus)
Player of the match: Andriani (Idn)

- Indonesia won the toss and elected to field.

7 September 2023
09:30
Scorecard

Japan; 66/7 (20 overs)	v	Indonesia; 70/1 (14 overs)
Kurumi Ota 20 (27); Ni Luh Dewi 3/11 (4 overs)		Maria Corazon 26* (10); Erika Toguchi-Quinn 1/13 (2 overs)

Indonesia won by 9 wickets
Vanuatu Cricket Ground, Port Vila
Umpires: Kim Cotton (NZ) and Kalala Tanuvasa (Sam)
Player of the match: Ni Luh Dewi (Idn)

- Indonesia won the toss and elected to field.

7 September 2023
09:30
Scorecard

Fiji; 49 (16 overs)	v	Papua New Guinea; 55/1 (6.5 overs)
Ilisapeci Waqavakatoga 17 (16); Kaia Arua 4/7 (3 overs)		Tanya Ruma 24 (19); Karalaini Vakuruivalu 1/28 (3.5 overs)

Papua New Guinea won by 9 wickets
Vanuatu Cricket Ground (Oval 2), Port Vila
Umpires: Ashlee Gibbons (Aus) and Claire Polosak (Aus)
Player of the match: Kaia Arua (PNG)

- Fiji won the toss and elected to bat.

7 September 2023
13:30
Scorecard

Samoa; 120/4 (20 overs)	v	Cook Islands; 81 (15 overs)
Via Andrew 56 (58); Sonnia Vaia 2/21 (4 overs)		Koitai Mataora 20 (13); Aunoa Iopu 3/2 (1 over)

Samoa won by 39 runs
Vanuatu Cricket Ground, Port Vila
Umpires: Ashlee Gibbons (Aus) and Merielle Kenni (Van)
Player of the match: Via Andrew (Sam)

- Samoa won the toss and elected to bat.
- Maya Piakura (Cok) made her T20I debut.

7 September 2023
13:30
Scorecard

Vanuatu; 85/8 (20 overs)	v	Indonesia; 65 (19 overs)
Alvina Chilia 29* (33); Sang Maypriani 2/13 (3.1 overs)		Maria Corazon 17 (24); Rachel Andrew 3/9 (4 overs)

Vanuatu won by 20 runs
Vanuatu Cricket Ground (Oval 2), Port Vila
Umpires: Kim Cotton (NZ) and Lisa McCabe (Aus)
Player of the match: Rachel Andrew (Van)

- Indonesia won the toss and elected to field.

8 September 2023
09:30
Scorecard

Samoa; 78/8 (20 overs)	v	Vanuatu; 79/3 (13 overs)
Ruth Johnston 20 (26); Rayline Ova 2/7 (3 overs)		Rachel Andrew 40 (35); Aunoa Iopu 1/5 (1 over)

Vanuatu won by 7 wickets
Vanuatu Cricket Ground, Port Vila
Umpires: Lisa McCabe (Aus) and Claire Polosak (Aus)
Player of the match: Rachel Andrew (Van)

- Vanuatu won the toss and elected to field.

8 September 2023
09:30
Scorecard

Fiji; 88/6 (20 overs)	v	Cook Islands; 89/2 (12.1 overs)
Sulia Vuni 32 (39); Zamera Ikiua 3/18 (4 overs)		Zamera Ikiua 41 (39); Ruci Muriyalo 2/11 (3.1 overs)

Cook Islands won by 8 wickets
Vanuatu Cricket Ground (Oval 2), Port Vila
Umpires: Ashlee Gibbons (Aus) and Merielle Kenni (Van)
Player of the match: Zamera Ikiua (Cok)

- Cook Islands won the toss and elected to field.

8 September 2023
13:30
Scorecard

Papua New Guinea; 141/4 (20 overs)	v	Indonesia; 64 (16.3 overs)
Brenda Tau 50 (52); Sang Maypriani 1/20 (3 overs)		Maria Corazon 33 (34); Isabel Toua 3/3 (2.3 overs)

Papua New Guinea won by 77 runs
Vanuatu Cricket Ground, Port Vila
Umpires: Claire Polosak (Aus) and Kalala Tanuvasa (Sam)
Player of the match: Brenda Tau (PNG)

- Indonesia won the toss and elected to field.

8 September 2023
13:30
Scorecard

Vanuatu; 107/2 (20 overs)	v	Japan; 86/9 (20 overs)
Rachel Andrew 43 (46); Ahilya Chandel 1/13 (4 overs)		Haruna Iwasaki 16 (17); Selina Solman 2/11 (4 overs)

Vanuatu won by 21 runs
Vanuatu Cricket Ground (Oval 2), Port Vila
Umpires: Kim Cotton (NZ) and Ashlee Gibbons (Aus)
Player of the match: Rachel Andrew (Van)

- Japan won the toss and elected to field.
