= Cricket at the 2019 Pacific Games – Women's tournament =

Women's cricket at the 2019 Pacific Games
- Dates: 8 – 13 July 2019
- Administrator: Pacific Games Council
- Cricket format: Women's Twenty20 International
- Tournament format(s): Double round-robin and medal matches
- Host: Samoa
- Champions: Samoa (2nd title)
- Participants: 4
- Matches: 15
- Most runs: (Samoa) Regina Lili'i (170)
- Most wickets: (Samoa) Lagi Telea (16)

A women's Twenty20 cricket tournament at the 2019 Pacific Games in Apia, Samoa, was held from 8 to 13 July 2019 at the Faleata Oval Grounds. Following the International Cricket Council's decision to grant T20I status to all women's matches played between Associate Members after 1 July 2018, matches were eligible for Twenty20 International (T20I) status subject to both teams being members of the ICC and players passing eligibility criteria.

The teams involved in the women's tournament were the host nation Samoa, Fiji, Papua New Guinea and Vanuatu. Samoa defeated Papua New Guinea by 4 wickets in the final to win the gold medal, while Vanuatu took bronze.

== Round-robin stage ==
=== Points Table ===
| Team | P | W | L | T | NR | Pts | NRR |
|---|---|---|---|---|---|---|---|
| Papua New Guinea | 6 | 5 | 1 | 0 | 0 | 10 | +1.028 |
| Samoa (H) | 6 | 5 | 1 | 0 | 0 | 10 | +0.763 |
| Vanuatu | 6 | 2 | 4 | 0 | 0 | 4 | +0.425 |
| Fiji | 6 | 0 | 6 | 0 | 0 | 0 | –3.065 |

(H) Host

- advanced to the gold medal match
- advanced to the bronze medal match

=== Matches ===
8 July 2019
13:30

| Fiji; 16/1 (4.1 overs) | v | Vanuatu |

No result
Faleata Oval 4, Apia

- Vanuatu won the toss and elected to field.
- Rain prevented any further play, with the match rescheduled for 9 July. The original match has not been recorded as a WT20I.

9 July 2019
09:30
Scorecard

| Fiji; 96/8 (20 overs) | v | Papua New Guinea; 102/1 (12.4 overs) |
| Ruci Muriyalo 49 (38); Sibona Jimmy 2/17 (4 overs) | | Tanya Ruma 40* (31); Alicia Dean 1/16 (3 overs) |

Papua New Guinea won by 9 wickets
Faleata Oval 4, Apia
Umpires: Pierre Chilia (Van) and Juha Ipolito (Sam)

- Fiji won the toss and elected to bat.
- Alicia Dean (Fij) and Erani Pokana (PNG) both made their WT20I debuts.

9 July 2019
09:30
Scorecard

| Vanuatu; 87/7 (20 overs) | v | Samoa; 88/9 (19.4 overs) |
| Leimauri Chilia 44 (51); Taalili Iosefo 3/15 (4 overs) | | Regina Lili'i 26 (48); Nasimana Navaika 3/18 (4 overs) |

Samoa won by 1 wicket
Faleata Oval 1, Apia
Umpires: Lakani Oala (PNG) and Walesi Soqoiwasa (Van)

- Samoa won the toss and elected to field.
- Faaiuga Sisifo (Sam) and Leimauri Chilia (Van) both made their WT20I debuts.

9 July 2019
13:30
Scorecard

| Papua New Guinea; 99/8 (20 overs) | v | Samoa; 86 (19.3 overs) |
| Naoani Vare 22 (28); Lagi Telea 3/12 (3 overs) | | Felea Pula 25 (22); Natasha Ambo 4/14 (4 overs) |

Papua New Guinea won by 13 runs
Faleata Oval 1, Apia
Umpires: Pierre Chilia (Van) and Walesi Soqoiwasa (Van)

- Papua New Guinea won the toss and elected to bat.
- Kalala Tanuvasa (Sam) and Gari Buruka (PNG) both made their WT20I debuts.

9 July 2019
13:30
Scorecard

| Fiji; 131/8 (20 overs) | v | Vanuatu; 133/5 (17.5 overs) |
| Ruci Muriyalo 35 (26); Nasimana Navaika 3/26 (4 overs) | | Rachel Andrew 46 (35); Alicia Dean 4/21 (4 overs) |

Vanuatu won by 5 wickets
Faleata Oval 4, Apia
Umpires: Juha Ipolita (Sam) and Lakani Oala (PNG)

- Vanuatu won the toss and elected to field.

10 July 2019
13:30
Scorecard

| Papua New Guinea; 128/3 (20 overs) | v | Vanuatu; 101/8 (20 overs) |
| Brenda Tau 62* (58); Rachel Andrew 2/17 (4 overs) | | Leimauri Chilia 25 (20); Isabel Toua 1/10 (1 over) |

Papua New Guinea won by 27 runs
Faleata Oval 1, Apia
Umpires: Juha Ipolita (Sam) and Walesi Soqoiwasa (Van)

- Vanuatu won the toss and elected to field.

10 July 2019
13:30
Scorecard

| Fiji; 71 (18.1 overs) | v | Samoa; 75/3 (9.3 overs) |
| Alicia Dean 21 (39); Taalili Iosefo 3/17 (5 overs) | | Regina Lili'i 38* (40); Marica Vua 2/15 (2 overs) |

Samoa won by 7 wickets
Faleata Oval 4, Apia
Umpires: Pierre Chilia (Van) and Lakani Oala (PNG)

- Fiji won the toss and elected to bat.
- Ruth Johnston (Sam) made her WT20I debut.

11 July 2019
09:30
Scorecard

| Fiji; 43 (14.4 overs) | v | Vanuatu; 46/2 (4 overs) |
| Semaema Lomani 10 (21); Alvina Chilia 3/8 (4 overs) | | Rachel Andrew 23 (10); Luanne Rika 1/10 (1 over) |

Vanuatu won by 8 wickets
Faleata Oval 1, Apia
Umpires: Juha Ipolita (Sam) and Lakani Oala (PNG)
Player of the match: Alvina Chilia (Van)

- Fiji won the toss and elected to bat.
- Merielle Kenni (Van) made her WT20I debut.

11 July 2019
09:30
Scorecard

| Papua New Guinea; 74 (19.3 overs) | v | Samoa; 78/4 (17.5 overs) |
| Brenda Tau 22 (35); Lagi Telea 3/17 (3.3 overs) | | Lily Mulivai 21* (32); Natasha Ambo 2/18 (3 overs) |

Samoa won by 6 wickets
Faleata Oval 4, Apia
Umpires: Pierre Chilia (Van) and Walesi Soqoiwasa (Van)

- Papua New Guinea won the toss and elected to bat.

12 July 2019
09:30
Scorecard

| Fiji; 66 (14.3 overs) | v | Papua New Guinea; 70/4 (11.5 overs) |
| Ariera Tagilala 17 (18); Sibona Jimmy 4/13 (4 overs) | | Brenda Tau 26* (29); Mereia Tilau 1/8 (0.5 overs) |

Papua New Guinea won by 6 wickets
Faleata Oval 1, Apia
Umpires: Pierre Chilia (Van) and Juha Ipolito (Sam)

- Papua New Guinea won the toss and elected to field.

12 July 2019
09:30
Scorecard

| Samoa; 82/7 (20 overs) | v | Vanuatu; 65 (18.1 overs) |
| Lily Mulivai 20 (21); Selina Solman 3/11 (4 overs) | | Selina Solman 15 (18); Lagi Telea 3/8 (4 overs) |

Samoa won by 17 runs
Faleata Oval 4, Apia
Umpires: Lakani Oala (PNG) and Walesi Soqoiwasa (Van)

- Vanuatu won the toss and elected to field.

12 July 2019
13:30
Scorecard

| Fiji; 126/5 (20 overs) | v | Samoa; 127/4 (17.5 overs) |
| Alicia Dean 55 (51); Lagi Telea 2/35 (4 overs) | | Regina Lili'i 51 (48); Alicia Dean 1/14 (2 overs) |

Samoa won by 6 wickets
Faleata Oval 1, Apia
Umpires: Pierre Chilia (Van) and Lakani Oala (PNG)

- Samoa won the toss and elected to field.

12 July 2019
13:30
Scorecard

| Papua New Guinea; 100/6 (20 overs) | v | Vanuatu; 98/7 (20 overs) |
| Ravina Oa 16* (13); Nasimana Navaika 2/13 (4 overs) | | Leimauri Chilia 37 (39); Ravina Oa 4/13 (4 overs) |

Papua New Guinea won by 2 runs
Faleata Oval 4, Apia
Umpires: Juha Ipolito (Sam) and Walesi Soqoiwasa (Van)

- Papua New Guinea won the toss and elected to bat.

== Finals ==
=== Bronze medal match ===
13 July 2019
09:30
Scorecard

| Fiji; 79/9 (20 overs) | v | Vanuatu; 80/2 (8.2 overs) |
| Alicia Dean 25 (35); Rachel Andrew 3/7 (4 overs) | | Rachel Andrew 41* (25); Mereia Tilau 1/18 (1 over) |

Vanuatu won by 8 wickets
Faleata Oval 1, Apia
Umpires: Pierre Chilia (Van) and Juha Ipolito (Sam)
Player of the match: Rachel Andrew (Van)

- Fiji won the toss and elected to bat.

=== Gold medal match ===
13 July 2019
13:30
Scorecard

| Papua New Guinea; 72/7 (20 overs) | v | Samoa; 73/6 (18.3 overs) |
| Kaia Arua 25* (45); Taalili Iosefo 3/23 (4 overs) | | Regina Lili'i 20 (47); Mairi Tom 3/16 (3.3 overs) |

Samoa won by 4 wickets
Faleata Oval 1, Apia
Umpires: Lakani Oala (PNG) and Walesi Soqoiwasa (Van)

- Samoa won the toss and elected to field.

== See also ==
- Cricket at the 2019 Pacific Games – Men's tournament
