= Cricket at the 2015 Pacific Games – Women's tournament =

Women's cricket at the 2015 Pacific Games
- Dates: 6 – 11 July 2015
- Administrator: Pacific Games Council
- Cricket format: 20-over
- Tournament format(s): Group stage, playoffs
- Host: PNG
- Champions: Samoa (1st title)
- Participants: 6
- Matches: 19

A women's 20-over cricket tournament at the 2015 Pacific Games in Port Moresby, Papua New Guinea, was held from 6 to 11 July 2015. Played at Amini Park and the Colts Cricket Ground, it will be followed by the men's tournament at the same venues the following week.

Six teams participated in the tournament, two more than in the men's version – at earlier editions of the Pacific Games (previously known as the South Pacific Games), no women's tournament was played. Samoa defeated Papua New Guinea by three runs in the final to win the gold medal, becoming only the second country (after Papua New Guinea) to win a Pacific Games gold medal in cricket. Fiji defeated Vanuatu in a play-off for the bronze medal.

The tournament also served as part of the qualification process for the 2018 World Twenty20 in the West Indies, with the top two teams joining Japan in a tri-series in 2016 to decide the ICC East Asia-Pacific region's representative at the World Twenty20 Qualifier in 2017. Because New Caledonia is not an ICC member, a separate system was used to decide which two teams proceeded. However, the separate system produced the same teams as the regular table.

== Preparation ==
Papua New Guinea and Samoa prepared for the tournament by playing a series in Apia, with PNG also playing matches against the men's under-19 team. As part of an arrangement with ICC East Asia-Pacific, Australia's Melbourne Cricket Club (MCC) toured both Fiji and Vanuatu in May 2015, fielding a mixed men's and women's team in matches against the Fiji and Vanuatu women's national teams. Earlier, in April, Vanuatu had hosted New Caledonia.

== Group stage ==
Qualified for the final.
Qualified for the preliminary final.

Pos	Team	Pld	W	L	T	NR	Pts	NRR
1	Papua New Guinea	5	5	0	0	0	15	4.100
2	Samoa	5	4	1	0	0	12	4.019
3	Vanuatu	5	3	2	0	0	9	−0.020
4	Fiji	5	2	3	0	0	6	−0.169
5	Cook Islands	5	1	4	0	0	3	−2.227
6	New Caledonia	5	0	5	0	0	0	−5.176

6 July
Scorecard

Fiji; 167/4 (20 overs)	v	Cook Islands; 96/7 (20 overs)

Fiji won by 71 runs
Colts Cricket Ground, Port Moresby

- Cook Islands won the toss and elected to bowl.

6 July
Scorecard

Papua New Guinea; 139/8 (20 overs)	v	Vanuatu; 85/9 (20 overs)

PNG won by 54 runs
Amini Park, Port Moresby

- PNG won the toss and elected to bat.

6 July
Scorecard

Samoa; 204/4 (20 overs)	v	New Caledonia; 57 (13.2 overs)

Samoa won by 147 runs
Colts Cricket Ground, Port Moresby

6 July
Scorecard

Papua New Guinea; 180/4 (20 overs)	v	Cook Islands; 62 (19 overs)

PNG won by 118 runs
Amini Park, Port Moresby

- PNG won the toss and elected to bat.

7 July
Scorecard

New Caledonia; 56 (14.4 overs)	v	Fiji; 57/3 (7.4 overs)

Fiji won by 7 wickets
Colts Cricket Ground, Port Moresby

7 July
Scorecard

Vanuatu; 77 (16.5 overs)	v	Samoa; 79/2 (8.5 overs)

Samoa won by 8 wickets
Amini Park, Port Moresby

- Vanuatu won the toss and elected to bat.

7 July
Scorecard

Cook Islands; 84/6 (20 overs)	v	Samoa; 85/2 (7.4 overs)

Samoa won by 8 wickets
Colts Cricket Ground, Port Moresby

- Cook Islands won the toss and elected to bat.

7 July
Scorecard

Papua New Guinea; 167/2 (20 overs)	v	Fiji; 86 (18.4 overs)

PNG won by 81 runs
Amini Park, Port Moresby

- PNG won the toss and elected to bat.

9 July
Scorecard

Vanuatu; 107/9 (20 overs)	v	New Caledonia; 47 (15.2 overs)

Vanuatu won by 60 runs
Amini Park, Port Moresby

- Vanuatu won the toss and elected to bat.

9 July
Scorecard

Fiji; 92/6 (20 overs)	v	Samoa; 93/1 (10.2 overs)

Samoa won by 9 wickets
Colts Cricket Ground, Port Moresby

- Fiji won the toss and elected to bat.

9 July
Scorecard

Vanuatu; 104/8 (20 overs)	v	Cook Islands; 74/7 (20 overs)

Vanuatu won by 30 runs
Colts Cricket Ground, Port Moresby

- Vanuatu won the toss and elected to bat.

9 July
Scorecard

Papua New Guinea; 194/3 (20 overs)	v	New Caledonia; 62 (19 overs)

PNG won by 132 runs
Amini Park, Port Moresby

- PNG won the toss and elected to bat.

10 July
Scorecard

Papua New Guinea; 120/7 (20 overs)	v	Samoa; 95/7 (20 overs)

PNG won by 25 runs
Amini Park, Port Moresby

- PNG won the toss and elected to bat.

10 July
Scorecard

Cook Islands; 132/8 (20 overs)	v	New Caledonia; 52 (17.5 overs)

Cook Islands won by 80 runs
Colts Cricket Ground, Port Moresby

- Cook Islands won the toss and elected to bat.

10 July
Scorecard

Fiji; 82 (17.1 overs)	v	Vanuatu; 84/5 (16.5 overs)

Vanuatu won by 5 wickets
Amini Park, Port Moresby

- Fiji won the toss and elected to bat.

== Finals ==
=== Fifth-place playoff ===
11 July
Scorecard

New Caledonia; 59 (13.5 overs)	v	Cook Islands; 60/2 (9.5 overs)

Cook Islands won by 8 wickets
Colts Cricket Ground, Port Moresby

- New Caledonia won the toss and elected to bat.

=== Preliminary final (2nd vs 3rd) ===
11 July
Scorecard

Samoa; 84/8 (18 overs)	v	Vanuatu; 44 (14.5 overs)

Samoa won by 40 runs
Amini Park, Port Moresby

- Vanuatu won the toss and elected to bowl.
- The match was reduced to 18 overs per side before the start of play.
- Samoa qualified for the final, Vanuatu qualified for the bronze-medal playoff.

=== Bronze-medal playoff ===
11 July
Scorecard

Fiji; 118/8 (20 overs)	v	Vanuatu; 106 (19.1 overs)

Fiji won by 12 runs
Colts Cricket Ground, Port Moresby

- Fiji won the toss and elected to bat.

=== Final ===
11 July
Scorecard

Samoa; 103/9 (20 overs)	v	Papua New Guinea; 100/9 (20 overs)

Samoa won by 3 runs
Amini Park, Port Moresby

- Samoa won the toss and elected to bat.

== Statistics ==
=== Most runs ===
The top five runscorers are included in this table, ranked by runs scored and then by batting average.

Player	Team	Runs	Inns	Avg	Highest	100s	50s
Norma Ovasuru	Papua New Guinea	239	5	47.80	75	0	2
Varoi Morea	Papua New Guinea	170	6	34.00	61*	0	1
Ruci Muriyalo	Fiji	167	5	83.50	72	0	1
Lily Mulivai	Samoa	139	7	27.80	59*	0	1
Regina Lili'i	Samoa	134	6	44.67	66*	0	1

Source: CricHQ

=== Most wickets ===
The top five wicket takers are listed in this table, ranked by wickets taken and then by bowling average.

Player	Team	Overs	Wkts	Ave	SR	Econ	BBI
Selina Solman	Vanuatu	24.2	12	6.67	12.17	3.29	3/3
Ruci Muriyalo	Fiji	22.1	12	7.42	11.08	4.01	5/8
Lagi Tele'a	Samoa	18.0	11	6.27	9.82	3.83	5/11
Boni David	Papua New Guinea	23.0	11	6.55	12.55	3.13	4/10
Valenta Langiatu	Vanuatu	19.0	11	9.36	10.36	5.42	3/11

Source: CricHQ

== Final standings ==
Rank	Team	Pld	W	T	L	NR
1st place, gold medalist(s)	Samoa	7	6	0	1	0
2nd place, silver medalist(s)	Papua New Guinea	6	5	0	1	0
3rd place, bronze medalist(s)	Fiji	6	3	0	3	0
4	Vanuatu	7	3	0	4	0
5	Cook Islands	6	2	0	4	0
6	New Caledonia	6	0	0	6	0

== See also ==
- Cricket at the 2015 Pacific Games – Men's tournament
