= Vanuatu Cricket Ground =

Cricket ground

- Interactive map of Vanuatu Cricket Ground

Ground information
- Location: Port Vila, Vanuatu
- Coordinates: 17.73375°S 168.33471°E
- Owner: Vanuatu Cricket Association
- Operator: Vanuatu Cricket Association

International information
- First men's T20I: 9 September 2022: Vanuatu v Fiji
- Last men's T20I: 15 September 2022: Vanuatu v Cook Islands
- First women's T20I: 3 October 2022: Vanuatu v Samoa
- Last women's T20I: 8 September 2023: Papua New Guinea v Indonesia
- As of 8 September 2023; Source: ESPNcricinfo

Vanuatu Cricket Ground Oval 2
- Oval 2
- Interactive map of Vanuatu Cricket Ground Oval 2

Ground information
- Location: Port Vila, Vanuatu

International information
- First women's T20I: 3 October 2022: Fiji v Papua New Guinea
- Last women's T20I: 8 September 2023: Vanuatu v Japan
- As of 8 September 2023; Source: ESPNcricinfo

Vanuatu Cricket Ground is one of the main cricket grounds in Port Vila, in the Island nation of Vanuatu, in the South Pacific Ocean. It hosted the 2022–23 ICC Men's T20 World Cup East Asia-Pacific Qualifier tournament in September 2022. The 2022 Women's T20I Pacific Cup in October 2022 was the first women's Twenty20 International tournament held in Vanuatu.

The ground is located adjacent to Korman Stadium and was built for the 2005 ICC EAP Cricket Cup. It was originally named the KaZaa Cricket Field.
