= Geua Tom =

Papua New Guinean cricketer

Personal information
- Born: 6 October 1995 (age 31)
- Batting: Right-handed
- Bowling: Right-arm medium

International information
- National side: Papua New Guinea
- ODI debut (cap 9): 24 March 2024 v Zimbabwe
- Last ODI: 9 August 2024 v Netherlands
- T20I debut (cap 22): 21 September 2022 v Thailand
- Last T20I: 14 August 2024 v Netherlands
- Source: ESPNcricinfo, 7 October 2024

Geua Pauke Tom (born 6 October 1995) is a Papua New Guinean cricketer. She made her T20I and ODI debut for Papua New Guinea women's national cricket team, in September 2022 and March 2024, respectively.

== Background ==
Geua Tom was raised by her grandmother. She stays with her grandmother and three children. She faced financial difficulties in her life with the meager players' contracts. She said "Cricket is my bread and butter to put food on the table", as the whole family depends on her income through cricket. She said that cricket is a "big sacrifice" to support her family.

== Career ==
Tom first played for Papua New Guinea on 28 April 2017, against Vanuatu in the 2017 ICC Women's World Twenty20 Qualifier East Asia-Pacific Region.

She made her T20I debut against Thailand in the 2022 Women's T20 World Cup qualifier. She neither batted nor bowled in the match, while Papua New Guinea lost the match by 12 runs. Few weeks after the completion of the tournament, she played for Papua New Guinea in the inaugural Women's T20 Pacific Cup. Her second match of T20I career was against Samoa in this tournament, where she took two wickets for 11 runs. She was however wicketless for the rest of the tournament. She took part in 2023 ICC Women's T20 World Cup EAP qualifier.

On 24 March 2024, she made her One Day International debut against Zimbabwe at Harare, which was Papua New Guinea's first-ever Women's ODI match.
