= Sport in Vanuatu =

Sports in Vanuatu are played throughout the country.

== Football (soccer) ==
Association football is the most popular sport in the country. In 1988, Vanuatu became a member of FIFA and the OFC.

Vanuatu has one of the most advanced technical programs in Oceania, particularly at youth level. The Melanesian nation was chosen as one of six countries globally for a FIFA pilot project whereby players are identified at a young age and selected to train and stay full-time at the national academy. As part of that two-year program for players aged 15–17, consideration is given to continuing school or vocational education.

The men's national football team has never qualified for the World Cup. They finished runner up in the OFC Nations Cup and they also finished runner up in the South Pacific Games.

== Basketball ==
Vanuatu's basketball federation has the country's longest international sports federation membership as it joined the International Federation of Basketball (FIBA) in 1966.

== Cricket ==
Cricket has gained significant popularity in Vanuatu over recent decades. The Vanuatu National Cricket Team, an associate member of the International Cricket Council (ICC) in the East Asia-Pacific region, has performed notably, securing the runner-up position in the ICC East Asia-Pacific Cup against Papua New Guinea. Additionally, the Vanuatu Women's team has successfully advanced to the 2024 ICC Women's T20 World Cup Qualifier after winning against all six opponents at the regional qualifier.

== National Sports Federation ==
After Independence, the National Sports Federations (NSFs) came under the Government body called Vanuatu Amateur Sports Federation (VASF).

The VASF started a “national games” called, the Inter-District Games (IDG) in 1982 that were held bi-annually in selected district capitals of the four districts, namely, the Northern District, Southern District, Central District No.1 and Central District No.2. The last IDG was held in 1988 in Ambae. The “national games” were revived by VASANOC in 1997 under the name, “Inter-Provincial Games” and is now called the Vanuatu National Games. Unlike the IDG, this one had a Games Charter to guide its organization.

A national secondary school games was established in 2000 and organized mainly by schoolteachers but discontinued after the 2005 Games due to funding and lack of consistent school competitions.

The Vanuatu National Olympic Committee was formerly established in March 1987 when IOC President Juan Antonio Samaranch visited the country. As required by the Olympic Charter, the five Olympic NSFs that helped to establish the NOC were athletics, basketball, boxing, football and volleyball. All these NSFs had Constitutions that required them to have sports leagues in the islands and were seeking IF membership which was impossible without NOC approval. The IOC Congress in February 1987 in Turkey officially accepted Vanuatu's membership as an IOC member and the country's first participation in the Olympic Games was in the 1988 Games in Seoul, South Korea in the sport of Athletics and Boxing. Since Seoul, Vanuatu has participated in all editions of the Games in Athletics and Archery (in 2000) and Table-Tennis (in 2008). Vanuatu also participated in the inaugural Youth Olympic Games in Singapore in football and 3on3 women's basketball. Since 1988, all Ni-Vanuatu athletes to the Olympics have been wildcards, with exception of Archery in 2000. The Vanuatu Beach-Volleyball Women's Team are currently on track to qualify on merit in the London Games in 2012.

Vanuatu has been participating in the Commonwealth Games since the 1982 Games in Brisbane, Australia in the sport of Athletics consecutively, Boxing (1982 and 1986), Cycling (1990), Table-Tennis (2006 and 2010).

Since Independence, Vanuatu has participated in all editions of the Pacific Games from 1983 in Samoa and Pacific Mini-Games since 1981 in Solomon Islands. However the Government ordered VASF and VNOC not participate in the 1987 Games in New Caledonia in protest over the territory's independence from France. The government-funded VASF which made up most of the NSFs abided by the government decision. However, the newly formed VNOC saw this as political interference and led by the then VNOC (and also VFF) President, Mr Kalman Kiri, defied the decision and sent the football team to compete. This team was tagged “rebel team” by the government. This not only resulted in the government withdrawing funds for Inter-District Games and for the NSFs in VASF but also resulted in the need for NSFs to merge both VASF and VNOC into one main national sports body. In 1990 and with the help of IOC and ONOC, [www.vasanoc.com.vu VASANOC] was formed. At the first AGM in March 1991 the VASANOC Constitution was officially approved and adopted and recognized by the IOC, Government and ONOC. Only 10 NSFs were affiliated to VASANOC when it was formed even though during the years of the Pacific Games, membership increases. Now VERSION has over 25 National Federations in its membership. The 8 NSFs that are organized into Associations, Leagues and Clubs in the rural areas are Athletics, Basketball, Boxing, Football, Handball, Karate, Netball and Volleyball even though the frequency of activities in the provinces differs greatly for each sport. The NSFs operate under their own Constitutions and abide by the Rules and Regulations established by their ISFs and or OSFs.

Apart from participation in the above games, the following Vanuatu sports have participated in their respective world championships either at continental or international levels or both: Archery, Athletics, Basketball, Boxing, Cricket, Football, Handball, Judo, Karate, Netball, Pétanque, Rugby Union, Table-Tennis, Taekwondo, Tennis, Volleyball (Beach Volleyball) and Weightlifting.

In 1989 during the PGC meeting in Tonga, Vanuatu was awarded the right to host the 1993 Pacific Mini-Games.

The National Sports Council Act was drafted that year but approved in Parliament on 17 April 1990 paving the way for the establishment of the VNSC mainly to manage the sports facilities built for these Games and other government-owned sporting facilities in the future. The Minister of Sports appoints all the Council members.

Physical Education as a subject was removed from the education curriculum around the late 1980s as the government opted to concentrate on the academic subjects. The government later reconsidered this and in 2010 approved a new education curriculum that reinstated PE back into it. The actual implementation of the new curriculum for PE will start in 2012.

The VASANOC Board consists of 9 members that are nominated and elected by the NSFs at the Annual General Meeting of VASANOC to serve a four-year term on a voluntary basis.

The current VASANOC Constitution has the following portfolio for each of the Board members, namely Policy and Planning; Administration; Finance and Marketing; International Development; National Development; Provincial Development; Olympic Solidarity; Athlete Development and Women And Sports Development.

From 2003 to 2006, VASANOC reviewed its Constitution and the 2006 Constitution was amended in 2011.

VASANOC maintains close liaison with the Government's Department of Youth and Sport and NSFs in pursuing its activities. The bulk of VASANOC funding for the Pacific Games and Pacific Mini-Games comes from the Government.

The Minister of Sports is a Members of Parliament elected by a constituency and appointed by the Prime Minister according to the political make-up of the ruling government.

In 2011, VASANOC lead the successful Vanuatu Bid to host the 2017 Pacific Games and is currently working with the Melanesian Spearhead Group (MSG) for the establishment of the Melanesian Games in the near future.

== See also ==
- Sport in Oceania
- Culture of Vanuatu
- Vanuatu at the Olympics
