= Women's T20I Pacific Cup =

International cricket tournament

- Format: Twenty20 International
- First edition: 2022
- Latest edition: 2024
- Current champion: Papua New Guinea (2nd title)
- Most successful: Papua New Guinea (2 titles)
- Most runs: (Vanuatu) Rachel Andrew (336)
- Most wickets: (Vanuatu) Selina Solman (17)

The Women's T20I Pacific Cup is a Twenty20 International (T20I) cricket tournament held biennially in the South West Pacific region.

The inaugural tournament was held in 2022 as a double round-robin format in Port Vila, Vanuatu, contested between four nations (Vanuatu, Samoa, Papua New Guinea, and Fiji), with Papua New Guinea emerging victorious. The 2024 edition expanded to six teams, with the addition of Cook Islands and New Zealand Māori, as well as a play-off format after the group stage.

Papua New Guinea had won the first two editions, having finished on top of the group with 5 wins and no losses in 2022, and winning the final in 2024 against New Zealand Māori by five wickets.

== Results ==
Year	Host	Final		
Year	Host	Winner	Result	Runner-up
2022; Details	Vanuatu	Papua New Guinea	No final held	Vanuatu
2024; Details	New Zealand	Papua New Guinea	Won by 5 wickets	New Zealand Māori
