= Albert Park (Suva) =

Sports venue in Suva, Fiji

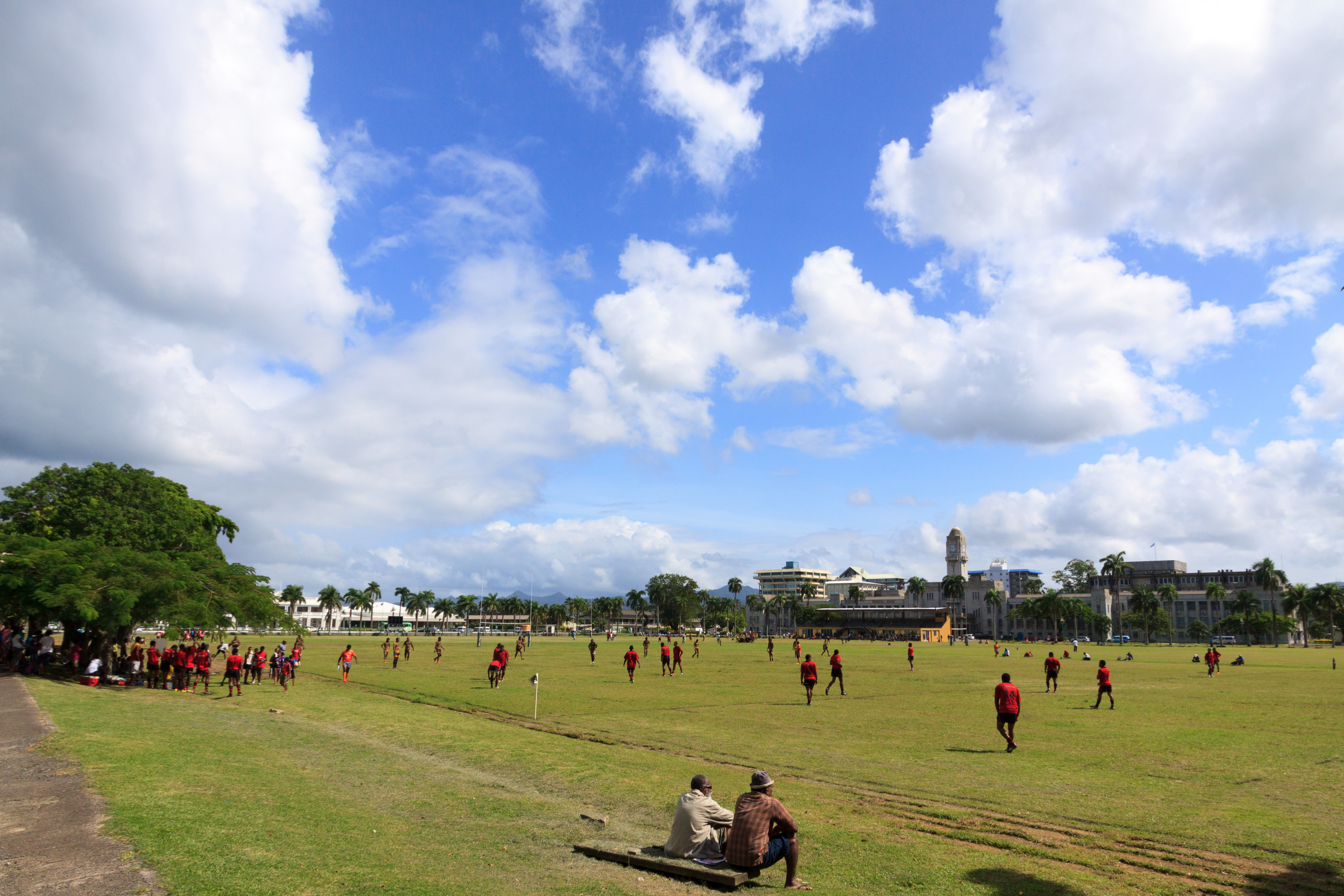
- Interactive map of Albert Park
- Type: Municipal
- Location: Suva, Fiji
- Coordinates: 18.1473°S 178.4249°E
- Visitors: unknown
- Open: All year

Albert Park is located in Suva, the capital of Fiji. It was named after Prince Albert, the Consort of Queen Victoria of Great Britain, to whom the country was ceded in 1874.

Albert Park can hold two rugby matches at one time. There is also a hockey pitch located in the middle of the ground with a grandstand and a cafeteria. The annual hibiscus festival is also held there.

The park was the site of a landing by the Australian aviator Sir Charles Kingsford Smith during the first trans-Pacific flight from the United States to Australia in 1928. It was also the site of the first hoisting of the new national flag of Fiji on 9 October 1970.

== Cricket ground ==
In August 2018, it was named as the host venue for the matches in Group A of the 2018–19 ICC World Twenty20 East Asia-Pacific Qualifier tournament.

Albert Park 1
- Interactive map of Albert Park 1

Ground information
- Location: Suva, Fiji
- Operator: Cricket Fiji
- Tenants: Fiji national cricket team Fiji women's national cricket team

International information
- First men's T20I: 13 March 2023: Samoa v Vanuatu
- Last men's T20I: 18 March 2023: Fiji v Samoa
- First women's T20I: 17 March 2023: Papua New Guinea v Samoa
- Last women's T20I: 18 March 2023: Fiji v Samoa
- As of 18 March 2023; Source: Albert Park 1, Cricinfo

Albert Park 2
- Interactive map of Albert Park 2

Ground information
- Location: Suva, Fiji
- Operator: Cricket Fiji
- Tenants: Fiji national cricket team Fiji women's national cricket team

International information
- Only men's T20I: 17 March 2023: Fiji v Vanuatu
- First women's T20I: 11 March 2023: Papua New Guinea v Samoa
- Last women's T20I: 18 March 2023: Papua New Guinea v Vanuatu
- As of 18 March 2023; Source: Albert Park 2, Cricinfo
