= Amini Park =

Cricket ground in Port Moresby, Papua New Guinea

Coordinates: 9°28′24″S 147°12′6″E

- Interactive map of Amini Park

Ground information
- Location: Boroko, Port Moresby, Papua New Guinea
- Country: Papua New Guinea
- Establishment: 1956
- Capacity: 2000
- Owner: Cricket PNG
- Operator: Cricket PNG
- Tenants: Papua New Guinea cricket team
- End names
- Basini End; Manu End

International information
- First men's ODI: 6 October 2017: Papua New Guinea v Scotland
- Last men's ODI: 21 September 2022: Papua New Guinea v Namibia
- First men's T20I: 22 March 2019: Papua New Guinea v Philippines
- Last men's T20I: 29 July 2023: Papua New Guinea v Japan
- First women's ODI: 13 October 2025: Papua New Guinea v United Arab Emirates
- Last women's ODI: 19 October 2025: Papua New Guinea v United Arab Emirates
- First women's T20I: 15 June 2025: Samoa v Vanuatu
- Last women's T20I: 21 June 2025: Papua New Guinea v Samoa
- As of 21 June 2025; Source: Amini Park, Cricinfo

Amini Park is a cricket ground in Port Moresby, Papua New Guinea. Part of the Bisini Parade Sports Complex in the suburb of Boroko, it is the headquarters of Cricket PNG.

== History ==
The ground was established in 1956 and named Amini Park in 1983 after the Amini family, several of whose members have played cricket and other sports for Papua New Guinea (both the men's and women's teams).

The ground has seen the men's team play Australia, the West Indies and Victoria. The women's team played Japan here in a three-match series in September 2006.

In May 2016, the ground hosted its first List A match when Papua New Guinea defeated Kenya in the 2015–17 ICC World Cricket League Championship. In October 2016, the ground hosted its first first-class match when Papua New Guinea defeated Namibia in the 2015–17 ICC Intercontinental Cup. The ground hosted the Regional Finals of the 2018–19 ICC World Twenty20 East Asia-Pacific Qualifier tournament in March 2019.

=== Other Sports ===
The ground also hosted Port Moresby Australian Rules Football League finals matches in the 2010s.

== International record ==
=== One Day International centuries ===
One ODI century has been scored at the venue.

No.	Score	Player	Team	Balls	Innings	Opposing team	Date	Result
1	154	Calum MacLeod	Scotland	163	1	Papua New Guinea	6 October 2017	Won

=== Twenty20 International centuries ===
One T20I century has been scored at the venue.

No.	Score	Player	Team	Balls	Innings	Opposing team	Date	Result
1	107*	Tony Ura	Papua New Guinea	60	1	Philippines	23 March 2019	No result
