= Alicia Dean =

Fijian cricketer

Personal information
- Full name: Alicia Zureen Dean
- Born: 9 December 1987 (age 38); Suva, Fiji
- Batting: Left-handed
- Role: Wicket-keeper

International information
- National side: Fiji (2019)
- T20I debut (cap 15): 9 July 2019 v Papua New Guinea
- Last T20I: 13 July 2019 v Vanuatu

Domestic team information
- Years: Team
- 2004/05–2013/14: South Australia

Career statistics
Competition	WT20I
Matches	7
Runs scored	122
Batting average	17.42
100s/50s	0/1
Top score	55
Balls bowled	84
Wickets	7
Bowling average	12.85
5 wickets in innings	0
10 wickets in match	0
Best bowling	4/21
Catches/stumpings	1/–
- Source: Cricinfo, 2 April 2021

Alicia Zureen Dean (born 9 December 1987) is a Fijian cricketer who plays as a wicket-keeper and left-handed batter. She has previously played for South Australia in Australian domestic cricket between 2005 and 2014. Dean's family migrated to Australia following the 1987 Fijian coups d'état, when she was one year old, before returning in 2010 to play for the national cricket team. She made her international debut for Fiji on 2 February 2010. She captained the side at the 2019 Pacific Games held in Samoa, scoring 122 runs and taking seven wickets as the team finished fourth without winning a match.
