= Varoi Morea =

Papua New Guinean cricketer (born 1986)

Personal information
- Full name: Varoi Igo Morea
- Born: November 27, 1986 (age 39); Port Moresby, Papua New Guinea
- Role: wicketkeeper

International information
- National side: Papua New Guinea
Medal record
Representing Papua New Guinea
Women's Cricket
Pacific Games
Silver medal – second place	2015 Port Moresby	20 over cricket
- Source: Cricinfo, 7 December 2017

Varoi Igo Morea (born 27 November 1986) is a Papua New Guinean woman cricketer. Varoi made her international debut at the 2015 ICC Women's World Twenty20 Qualifier and also represented Papua New Guinea in the 2015 Pacific Games.
