= 2021 Women's T20 World Cup EAP Qualifier =

International cricket tournament

2021 ICC Women's T20 World Cup EAP Qualifier
- Dates: 3 – 8 September 2021
- Administrator: International Cricket Council
- Cricket format: Twenty20 International
- Host: Samoa
- Participants: 8

The 2021 ICC Women's T20 World Cup EAP Qualifier was a cricket tournament that was scheduled to be played in Samoa in September 2021. The matches would have been played as Women's Twenty20 Internationals (WT20Is), with the top team progressing to the 2022 ICC Women's T20 World Cup Qualifier tournament. The Philippines were scheduled to make their debut at an ICC women's event. However, in August 2021, the International Cricket Council (ICC) confirmed that the tournament had been cancelled due to the COVID-19 pandemic. As a result, Papua New Guinea qualified as the highest-ranked EAP team as of 30 November 2021.

== Teams ==
The following teams were scheduled to compete in the tournament:

- Cook Islands
- Fiji
- Indonesia
- Japan
- Philippines
- Papua New Guinea
- Samoa
- Vanuatu
