= Regina Lili'i =

Samoan cricketer

Regina Liliʻi
Personal information
- Full name: Regina Sela Monika Liliʻi
- Born: 3 October 1986 (age 40); Apia, Samoa
- Batting: Right-handed
- Bowling: Right-arm medium
- Role: All-rounder

International information
- National side: Samoa (2019–2024)
- T20I debut (cap 5): 6 May 2019 v Fiji
- Last T20I: 19 Jan 2024 v Samoa

Domestic team information
- Years: Team
- 2010/11–2016/17: Auckland
- 2017/18: Northern Districts
- 2018/19–2020/21: Auckland

Career statistics
Competition	T20I	LA	WT20
Matches	17	75	86
Runs scored	434	656	697
Batting average	36.16	19.29	21.12
100s/50s	0/1	0/2	0/1
Top score	51	63	51
Balls bowled	24	1874	675
Wickets	2	45	26
Bowling average	13.50	29.60	29.23
5 wickets in innings	0	0	0
10 wickets in match	0	0	0
Best bowling	1/11	4/16	3/26
Catches/stumpings	11/0	17/0	35/0
Medal record
Representing Samoa
Women's Cricket
Pacific Games
Gold medal – first place	2015 Port Moresby	20 over cricket
Gold medal – first place	2019 Apia	20 over cricket
- Source: CricketArchive, 15 July 2024

Regina Sela Monika Liliʻi (born 3 October 1986) is a Samoan cricketer who has played for Samoa, Auckland and Northern Districts. She has also captained the New Zealand women's indoor cricket team, and was the first Pacific woman to lead the New Zealand side.

In May 2014, she was named as the player of the tournament in the East Asia Pacific Women's Cricket Trophy, and was part of Samoa's gold-winning team in the cricket tournament at the 2015 Pacific Games.

She captained Samoa's squad for the 2019 ICC Women's Qualifier East Asia-Pacific tournament, held in Vanuatu. She made her Twenty20 International (T20I) debut for Samoa against Fiji in the tournament on 6 May 2019. She finished as the leading run-scorer in the tournament, with 153 runs in five matches.
