= Vicky Araa =

Papua New Guinean cricketer (born 1996)

Personal information
- Full name: Vicky Araa
- Born: 28 June 1996 (age 30)
- Batting: Right-handed
- Bowling: Right-arm offbreak

International information
- National side: Papua New Guinea
- ODI debut (cap 1): 24 March 2024 v Zimbabwe
- Last ODI: 11 August 2024 v Scotland
- T20I debut (cap 1): 7 July 2018 v Bangladesh
- Last T20I: 15 August 2024 v Scotland
- Source: Cricinfo, 7 October 2024

Vicky Araa (born 28 June 1996) is a Papua New Guinean cricketer. In July 2018, she was named in Papua New Guinea's squad for the 2018 ICC Women's World Twenty20 Qualifier tournament. She made her Women's Twenty20 International (WT20I) debut against Bangladesh in the World Twenty20 Qualifier on 7 July 2018.

In April 2019, she was named in Papua New Guinea's squad for the 2019 ICC Women's Qualifier EAP tournament in Vanuatu, and in August 2019, for the 2019 ICC Women's World Twenty20 Qualifier tournament in Scotland. In October 2021, she was named in Papua New Guinea's team for the 2021 Women's Cricket World Cup Qualifier tournament in Zimbabwe.
