= Kaia Arua =

Papua New Guinean cricketer (1990–2024)

Personal information
- Full name: Kaia Arua
- Born: 27 October 1990
- Died: 4 April 2024 (aged 33); Korobosea, Port Moresby, Papua New Guinea
- Batting: Right-handed
- Bowling: Slow left-arm wrist-spin
- Role: Bowling allrounder

International information
- National side: Papua New Guinea
- T20I debut (cap 2): 7 July 2018 v Bangladesh
- Last T20I: 19 January 2024 v Fiji
Medal record
Representing Papua New Guinea
Women's Cricket
Pacific Games
Silver medal – second place	2019 Apia	Twenty20 International
- Source: ESPNcricinfo, 30 September 2019

Kaia Arua (27 October 1990 – 4 April 2024) was a Papua New Guinean cricketer. A left-arm wrist-spinner, she played for the Papua New Guinea women's national cricket team in the 2017 Women's Cricket World Cup Qualifier in February 2017.

In June 2018, she was named in Papua New Guinea's squad for the 2018 ICC Women's World Twenty20 Qualifier tournament. She made her Twenty20 International (T20I) debut against Bangladesh in the World Twenty20 Qualifier on 7 July 2018. She captained the side for the match against Ireland on 12 July 2018.

In July 2018, she was named in the ICC Women's Global Development Squad. In November 2018, she was again named in the Women's Global Development Squad, to play fixtures against Women's Big Bash League (WBBL) clubs.

In April 2019, she was named as the captain of Papua New Guinea's squad for the 2019 ICC Women's Qualifier EAP tournament in Vanuatu. In Papua New Guinea's penultimate match of the tournament, against Japan, she took her first five-wicket haul in T20Is.

In August 2019, she was named as the captain of Papua New Guinea's squad for the 2019 ICC Women's World Twenty20 Qualifier tournament in Scotland. In October 2019, she was named in the Women's Global Development Squad, ahead of a five-match series in Australia. In October 2021, she was named in Papua New Guinea's team for the 2021 Women's Cricket World Cup Qualifier tournament in Zimbabwe. Her spell of 5/7 in 4 overs against Japan is the second-best bowling figure by a PNG cricketer.

Arua died in Port Moresby General Hospital on 4 April 2024, at the age of 33, leaving a son and a daughter. While she had been ill prior to her death, the specific cause of her illness has not been publicly disclosed out of respect for the family's privacy.
