= Fiji women's national cricket team =

Cricket team

Fiji
- Cricket Fiji logo
- Association: Cricket Fiji

International Cricket Council
- ICC status: Associate member (1965)
- ICC region: East Asia-Pacific
ICC Rankings	Current	Best-ever
T20I	59th	51st (2 May 2022)

International cricket
- First international: v Samoa at Faleata Oval, Apia; 2 February 2010

T20 Internationals
- First T20I: v Samoa at Independence Park, Port Vila; 6 May 2019
- Last T20I: v Samoa at Albert Park Ground 1, Suva; 15 September 2025
T20Is	Played	Won/Lost
Total	45	6/37 (1 tie, 1 no result)
This year	0	0/0 (0 ties, 0 no results)
T20I kit
- As of 15 September 2025

The Fiji women's national cricket team is the team that represents the country of Fiji in international Women's cricket matches. Fiji has been an associate member of the International Cricket Council (ICC) since 1965. The national women's team made its international debut against Samoa in 2010 and its Women's Twenty20 International (T20I) debut in 2019. It is included in the ICC East Asia-Pacific development region.

== History ==
Cricket was introduced to Fiji by European settlers in 1874, and the native population began taking up the game in 1878. The governor of Fiji at the time listed introducing cricket to the native Fijians as one of the achievements of his tenure in his memoirs.

The Fiji women's cricket team came into existence some time in the middle of 2009. In January 2010, Cricket Fiji announced its first international series would take place against Samoa the following month. Fiji's first international match was played against Samoa on 2 February 2010 at Faleata Oval, Apia. The Fijian captain for the team's inaugural tour was former New Zealand international Losi Harford, who scored 57 runs opening the batting as Fiji lost to Samoa by six runs on debut.

In January 2011, Cricket Fiji announced its women's team's second tour. This one was to Vanuatu.

In April 2018, the ICC granted full Women's Twenty20 International (WT20I) status to all its members, with all Twenty20 matches played between Fiji women and other international sides after 1 July 2018 having the full T20I status. Fiji made its T20I debut at the 2019 ICC Women's Qualifier EAP in Vanuatu, losing all five matches. The team's next T20I appearances came in the 2019 Pacific Games in Samoa, again failing to win ay games.

In December 2020, the ICC announced the qualification pathway for the 2023 ICC Women's T20 World Cup. Fiji were named in the 2021 ICC Women's T20 World Cup EAP Qualifier regional group, alongside seven other teams. However, the tournament was cancelled due to the COVID-19 pandemic.

Fiji lost 19 consecutive T20I matches between its debut in 2019 and its inaugural T20I victory against Samoa in the 2023 Women's Pacific Island Cricket Challenge. This surpassed the previous record of 15 consecutive defeats held by Bangladesh.

== Tournament history ==
=== ICC Women's ODI World Cup ===
Women's Cricket World Cup records
Host Year	Round	Position	GP	W	L	T	NR
(England) 1973	Did not qualified						
(India) 1978	Did not qualified						
(New Zealand) 1982	Did not qualified						
(Australia) 1988	Did not qualified						
(England) 1993	Did not qualified						
(India) 1997	Did not qualified						
(New Zealand) 2000	Did not qualified						
(South Africa) 2005	Did not qualified						
(Australia) 2009	Did not qualified						
(India) 2013	Did not qualified						
(England) 2017	Did not qualified						
(New Zealand) 2022	Did not qualified						
(India) 2025	Did not qualified						
Total	0/13	0 Titles	0	0	0	0	0

=== ICC Women's Cricket World Cup Qualifier ===
ICC Women's Cricket World Cup Qualifier records
Host Year	Round	Position	GP	W	L	T	NR
(Netherlands) 2003	Did not qualify						
(South Africa) 2008	Did not qualify						
(Bangladesh) 2011	Did not qualify						
(Sri Lanka) 2017	Did not qualify						
(Zimbabwe) 2021	Did not qualify						
(Pakistan) 2025	Did not qualify						
Total	0/5	0 Title	0	0	0	0	0

=== ICC Women's Twenty20 World Cup ===
Twenty20 World Cup records
Host/Year	Round	Position	GP	W	L	T	NR
(England) 2009	Did not qualify						
(Cricket West Indies) 2010	Did not qualify						
(Sri Lanka) 2012	Did not qualify						
(Bangladesh) 2014	Did not qualify						
(India) 2016	Did not qualify						
(Cricket West Indies) 2018	Did not qualify						
(Australia) 2020	Did not qualify						
(South Africa) 2023	Did not qualify						
(United Arab Emirates) 2024	Did not qualify						
(England) 2026	To be determined						
Total	0/10	0 Titles	0	0	0	0	0

=== ICC Women's World Twenty20 Global Qualifier ===
ICC Women's World Twenty20 Qualifier records
Host Year	Round	Position	GP	W	L	T	NR
(Republic of Ireland) 2013	Did not qualify						
(Thailand) 2015	Did not qualify						
(Netherlands) 2018	Did not qualify						
(Scotland) 2019	Did not qualify						
(United Arab Emirates) 2022	Did not qualify						
(United Arab Emirates) 2024	Did not qualify						
(Nepal) 2026	To be determined						
Total	0/6	0 Titles	0	0	0	0	0

=== ICC Women's T20 Champions Trophy ===
ICC Women's T20 Champions Trophy records
Host Year	Round	Position	GP	W	L	T	NR
(Sri Lanka) 2027	To be determined						
2031	To be determined						
Total	–	0 Title	0	0	0	0	0

=== ICC Women's World Twenty20 East Asia Pacific Qualifiers ===
ICC Women's World Twenty20 Qualifier East Asia Pacific records
Host/Year	Round	Position	GP	W	L	T	NR
(Vanuatu) 2019	Round-robin	6/6	5	0	5	0	0
(Samoa) 2021	Tournament did not held due to COVID-19 pandemic						
(Vanuatu) 2023	Round-robin	7/7	6	1	5	0	0
(Fiji) 2025	5th-place	5/8	5	3	2	0	0
Total	2/2	0 Titles	16	4	12	0	0

=== Pacific Games ===
Cricket at the Pacific Games records
Host/Year	Round	Position	GP	W	L	T	NR
(Papua New Guinea) 2015	3rd-place	3/6	6	3	3	0	0
(Samoa) 2019	Round-robin	4/4	7	0	7	0	0
Total	2/2	0 Titles	13	3	10	0	0

=== Women's T20I Pacific Cup ===
Women's T20I Pacific Cup records
Host/Year	Round	Position	GP	W	L	T	NR
(Vanuatu) 2022	Round-robin	4/4	6	0	5	0	1
(New Zealand) 2024	Round-robin	6/6	6	0	6	0	0
Total	2/2	0 Titles	12	0	11	0	1

== Current Squad ==
Updated as on 21 January 2024

This lists all the players who played for Fiji in the past 12 months or were named in the most recent squad.

Name	Age	Batting style	Bowling style	Notes
Batters
Sulia Vuni	26	Right-handed		
Lagakali Lomani	24	Right-handed	Right-arm medium	
Mereani Rodan	23	Right-handed		
Marica Ratuki	39	Right-handed		
Cilia Lewatu	23			
Akosita Poulter		Right-handed		
All-rounders
Ilisapeci Waqavakatoga	27	Left-handed	Right-arm off break	Captain
Ateca Kainoco	22	Right-handed	Right-arm medium	
Ruci Muriyalo	39	Right-handed	Right-arm medium	
Wicket-keeper
Maeavhanisi Erasito	30	Right-handed		
Bowlers
Karalaini Vakuruivalu	25	Left-handed	Left-arm medium	
Melaia Biu	29	Left-handed	Left-arm medium	
Ana Gonerara	23	Right-handed	Right-arm medium	
Mele Waqanisau		Right-handed	Right-arm medium	
Silvia Kijiana				

== Records and statistics ==
International Match Summary — Fiji Women

Last updated 15 September 2025

Playing Record
Format	M	W	L	T	NR	Inaugural Match
Twenty20 Internationals	45	6	37	1	1	6 May 2019

=== Twenty20 International ===
- Highest team total: 131/8 v. Vanuatu on 9 July 2019 at Faleata Oval No 4, Apia.
- Highest individual innings: 55, Alicia Dean v. Samoa on 12 July 2019 at Faleata Oval No 1, Apia.
- Best innings bowling: 4/11, Ilisapeci Waqavakatoga v. France on 13 March 2025 at Stade N'Du, Nouméa.

Most T20I runs for Fiji Women

Player	Runs	Average	Career span
Ruci Muriyalo	443	17.03	2019–2023
Ilisapeci Waqavakatoga	393	10.34	2019–2025
Sulia Vuni	220	10.00	2022–2025
Semaema Lomani	215	12.64	2019–2025
Melaia Biu	155	7.38	2022–2025

Most T20I wickets for Fiji Women

Player	Wickets	Average	Career span
Karalaini Vakuruivalu	25	23.00	2022–2025
Ilisapeci Waqavakatoga	22	18.81	2019–2025
Ruci Muriyalo	18	27.88	2019–2023
Ana Gonerara	15	31.13	2022–2025
Melaia Biu	15	38.33	2022–2025

T20I record versus other nations

Records complete to WT20I #2513. Last updated 15 September 2025.

Opponent	M	W	L	T	NR	First match	First win
ICC Associate members
Cook Islands	4	1	3	0	0	8 September 2023	9 September 2025
France	2	1	0	1	0	13 March 2025	13 March 2025
Indonesia	3	0	3	0	0	10 May 2019	
Japan	4	0	4	0	0	9 May 2019	
Papua New Guinea	8	0	8	0	0	7 May 2019	
Philippines	1	1	0	0	0	13 September 2025	13 September 2025
Samoa	11	3	7	0	1	6 May 2019	14 March 2023
Vanuatu	12	0	12	0	0	7 May 2019	

== See also ==
- List of Fiji women Twenty20 International cricketers
