= Sibona Jimmy =

Papua New Guinean cricketer

Personal information
- Full name: Sibona Jimmy
- Born: 29 December 1992 (age 33)
- Batting: Left-handed
- Bowling: Right-arm offbreak

International information
- National side: Papua New Guinea
- ODI debut (cap 3): 24 March 2024 v Zimbabwe
- Last ODI: 11 August 2024 v Scotland
- T20I debut (cap 4): 7 July 2018 v Bangladesh
- Last T20I: 15 August 2024 v Scotland
Medal record
Representing Papua New Guinea
Women's Cricket
Pacific Games
Silver medal – second place	2019 Apia	Twenty20 International
- Source: Cricinfo, 7 October 2024

Sibona Jimmy (born 29 December 1992) is a Papua New Guinean cricketer.

Jimmy, a right-arm off-spin bowler and left-handed batter, played for the Papua New Guinea women's national cricket team in the 2017 Women's Cricket World Cup Qualifier in February 2017.

In June 2018, she was named in Papua New Guinea's squad for the 2018 ICC Women's World Twenty20 Qualifier tournament. She made her Women's Twenty20 International (WT20I) debut against Bangladesh in the World Twenty20 Qualifier on 7 July 2018. Following the conclusion of the tournament, she was named as the rising star of Papua New Guinea's squad by the International Cricket Council (ICC).

In April 2019, she was named in Papua New Guinea's squad for the 2019 ICC Women's Qualifier EAP tournament in Vanuatu, and in August 2019, for the 2019 ICC Women's World Twenty20 Qualifier tournament in Scotland. She was the leading run-scorer and wicket-taker for Papua New Guinea in the latter tournament, with 97 runs and eight dismissals in five matches. In October 2021, she was named in Papua New Guinea's team for the 2021 Women's Cricket World Cup Qualifier tournament in Zimbabwe.

In January 2024, Jimmy played a major part in Papua New Guinea's victory in the final of the 2024 Women's T20I Pacific Cup, taking 5 for 10 off four overs, participating in three run-outs, and making the match top score of 25.
