= Papua New Guinea women's national cricket team =

Cricket team

Papua New Guinea
- Cricket PNG logo
- Nickname: Lewas
- Association: Cricket PNG

Personnel
- Captain: Brenda Tau
- Coach: Kath Hempenstall

International Cricket Council
- ICC status: Associate member (1973)
- ICC region: East Asia-Pacific
ICC Rankings	Current	Best-ever
ODI	16th	15th (2 May 2025)
T20I	13th	11th (3 Oct 2023)

International cricket
- First international: v. Japan at Port Moresby; 12 September 2006

One Day Internationals
- First ODI: v Zimbabwe at Harare Sports Club, Harare; 24 March 2024
- Last ODI: v Thailand at Amini Park, Port Moresby; 17 August 2026
ODIs	Played	Won/Lost
Total	16	3/13 (0 ties, 0 no results)
This year	3	0/3 (0 ties, 0 no results)
- Women's World Cup Qualifier appearances: 2 (first in 2008)
- Best result: 7th (2008)

T20 Internationals
- First T20I: v. Bangladesh at VRA Cricket Ground, Amstelveen; 7 July 2018
- Last T20I: v. United Arab Emirates at Karwan Cricket Ground, Ajman; 18 November 2026
T20Is	Played	Won/Lost
Total	82	51/28 (1 tie, 2 no results)
This year	10	2/8 (0 ties, 0 no results)
- T20 World Cup Qualifier appearances: 3 (first in 2015)
- Best result: 4th (2018, 2019)
T20I kit
- As of 18 November 2026

The Papua New Guinea women's national cricket team, nicknamed the Lewas, represents Papua New Guinea in international women's cricket. The team is organised by Cricket PNG, an associate member of the International Cricket Council (ICC).

Papua New Guinea has been the leading women's associate team in the ICC East Asia-Pacific (EAP) since its international debut in 2006. It has represented EAP at the 50-Over World Cup Qualifier and T20 World Cup Qualifier on a number of occasions, making the semi-finals of the 2018 and 2019 T20 World Cup Qualifiers. It was awarded One Day International (ODI) status in 2022.

== History ==
Papua New Guinea made its international debut in September 2006, playing a three-match series against Japan to determine which team would represent the ICC East Asia-Pacific (EAP) region at the 2008 World Cup Qualifier. Papua New Guinea won the series against Japan three–nil, but at the World Cup Qualifier won only two matches, both against Bermuda.

The team failed to qualify for either the 2011 World Cup Qualifier or the 2013 World Twenty20 Qualifier, with Japan representing the EAP region on both occasions.

At the 2015 Pacific Games, which Papua New Guinea hosted, a women's cricket event was included for the first time. The team narrowly lost to Samoa in the final, having been undefeated up to that point. Later in the year, Papua New Guinea participated at its second global tournament, the 2015 World Twenty20 Qualifier, placing fifth out of eight teams.

In April 2018, the ICC granted full Women's Twenty20 International (WT20I) status to all its members. Therefore, all Twenty20 matches played between Papua New Guinea women and other international sides since 1 July 2018 have the full WT20I status.

The team played its first WT20I match against Bangladesh on 7 July 2018 at VRA Cricket Ground, Amstelveen in the Netherlands in the 2018 ICC Women's World Twenty20 Qualifier.

In December 2020, the ICC announced the qualification pathway for the 2023 ICC Women's T20 World Cup. Papua New Guinea were named in the 2021 ICC Women's T20 World Cup EAP Qualifier regional group, alongside seven other teams. However, in August 2021, the International Cricket Council (ICC) confirmed that the tournament had been cancelled due to the COVID-19 pandemic, and due to their ranking, Papua New Guinea qualified for the global qualifier held in 2022.

In October 2021, it was reported that Australian Kath Hempenstall had been appointed head coach of the Lewas in preparation for the 2021 Women's Cricket World Cup Qualifier in Zimbabwe, and it was expected that Hempenstall would meet the team in person for the first time there. However, on 8 November 2021, Papua New Guinea announced that they had been forced to withdraw due to several players testing positive for COVID-19.

In May 2022, the ICC announced Papua New Guinea as one of five women's sides to gain Women's One Day International (ODI) status.

The team played its first WODI match against Zimbabwe on 24 March 2024 at the Harare Sports Club, Harare during their tour of Zimbabwe.

== Current squad ==
This lists all the players who were named in the PNG squad for the 2024 Netherlands Women's Tri-Nation Series. Updated on 15 August 2024.

Name	Age	Batting style	Bowling style	Notes
Batters
Tanya Ruma	33	Right-handed	Right-arm medium	
Naoani Vare	28	Right-handed	Right-arm medium	
Kevau Frank	26	Right-handed		
Lakshmi Rajadurai	17	Right-handed	Right-arm medium	
All-rounders
Sibona Jimmy	33	Left-handed	Right-arm off break	
Vicky Araa	30	Right-handed	Right-arm off break	
Pauke Siaka	40	Right-handed	Right-arm medium	
Wicket-keeper
Brenda Tau	28	Left-handed		Captain
Spin Bowlers
Henao Thomas	24	Right-handed	Right-arm off break	
Dika Lohia	20	Right-handed	Right-arm off break	
Pace Bowlers
Isabel Toua	31	Right-handed	Right-arm medium	
Geua Tom	31	Right-handed	Right-arm medium	
Vicky Buruka	22	Left-handed	Left-arm medium	
Mahuta Jayphert	21	Right-handed	Right-arm medium	

== Tournament history ==
=== ICC Women's ODI World Cup ===
Women's Cricket World Cup records
Host Year	Round	Position	GP	W	L	T	NR
(England) 1973	Did not qualify						
(India) 1978	Did not qualify						
(New Zealand) 1982	Did not qualify						
(Australia) 1988	Did not qualify						
(England) 1993	Did not qualify						
(India) 1997	Did not qualify						
(New Zealand) 2000	Did not qualify						
(South Africa) 2005	Did not qualify						
(Australia) 2009	Did not qualify						
(India) 2013	Did not qualify						
(England) 2017	Did not qualify						
(New Zealand) 2022	Did not qualify						
(India) 2025	Did not qualify						
Total	0/13	0 Titles	0	0	0	0	0

=== ICC Women's Cricket World Cup Qualifier ===
ICC Women's Cricket World Cup Qualifier records
Host Year	Round	Position	GP	W	L	T	NR
(Netherlands) 2003	Did not qualify						
(South Africa) 2008	Did not qualify						
(Bangladesh) 2011	Did not qualify						
(Sri Lanka) 2017	Did not qualify						
(Zimbabwe) 2021	Did not qualify						
(Pakistan) 2025	Did not qualify						
Total	0/6	0 Title	0	0	0	0	0

=== ICC Women's World T20 ===
Twenty20 World Cup records
Host Year	Round	Position	GP	W	L	T	NR
(England) 2009	Did not qualify						
(Cricket West Indies) 2010	Did not qualify						
(Sri Lanka) 2012	Did not qualify						
(Bangladesh) 2014	Did not qualify						
(India) 2016	Did not qualify						
(Cricket West Indies) 2018	Did not qualify						
(Australia) 2020	Did not qualify						
(South Africa) 2023	Did not qualify						
(United Arab Emirates) 2024	Did not qualify						
(England) 2026	To be determined						
Total	0/9	0 Titles	0	0	0	0	0

=== ICC Women's Twenty20 Global Qualifier ===
ICC Women's World Twenty20 Qualifier records
Host Year	Round	Position	GP	W	L	T	NR
(Republic of Ireland) 2013	Did not qualify						
(Thailand) 2015	DNQ	5/8	5	3	2	0	0
(Netherlands) 2018	DNQ	4/8	5	2	3	0	0
(Scotland) 2019	DNQ	4/8	5	2	3	0	0
(United Arab Emirates) 2022	DNQ	5/8	5	3	2	0	0
(United Arab Emirates) 2024	Did not qualify						
(Nepal) 2026	To be determined						
Total	4/6	0 Titles	20	10	10	0	0

=== Cricket at Summer Olympics Games ===
Cricket at Summer Olympics records
Host Year	Round	Position	GP	W	L	T	NR
(United States) 2028	To be determined						
(Australia) 2032	To be determined						
Total	–	0 Title	0	0	0	0	0

=== ICC Women's T20 Champions Trophy ===
ICC Women's T20 Champions Trophy records
Host Year	Round	Position	GP	W	L	T	NR
(Sri Lanka) 2027	To be determined						
2031	To be determined						
Total	–	0 Title	0	0	0	0	0

=== ICC Women's Twenty20 World Cup East Asia Pacific Qualifier ===
ICC Women's Twenty20 World Cup Qualifier East Asia Pacific records
Year	Round	Position	GP	W	L	T	NR
(Vanuatu) 2019	Champion; Qualified	1/6	5	4	1	0	0
(Samoa) 2021	The tournament had been cancelled due to the COVID-19 pandemic						
(Vanuatu) 2023	DNQ	2/7	6	5	1	0	0
(Fiji) 2025	Champion; Qualified	1/8	5	5	0	0	0
Total	3/3	2 Titles	16	14	2	0	0

=== Women's T20I Pacific Cup ===
Women's T20I Pacific Cup records
Host/Year	Round	Position	GP	W	L	T	NR
(Vanuatu) 2022	Round-robin	1/6	6	5	0	0	1
(New Zealand) 2024	Round-robin	1/6	6	5	1	0	0
Total	2/2	0 Titles	12	11	1	0	1

=== Cricket at the Pacific Games ===
Pacific Games record
Year	Round	Position	GP	W	L	T	NR
(Papua New Guinea) 2015	Runners-up	2/6	6	5	1	0	0
(Samoa) 2019	Runners-up	2/4	7	5	2	0	0
Total	2/2	0 Titles	13	10	3	0	0

=== East Asia Pacific Women's Championship ===
East Asia Pacific Women's Championship records
Host/Year	Round	Position	GP	W	L	T	NR
(Japan) 2010	Champion	1/6	The full information of the tournament have not found				
(Vanuatu) 2012	Champion	1/6	The full information of the tournament have not found				
(Japan) 2014	Champion	1/5	The full information of the tournament have not found				
(Samoa) 2016	Champion	1/6	The full information of the tournament have not found				
Total	4/4	4 Titles	0	0	0	0	0

== Records and statistics ==
International Match Summary — Papua New Guinea Women

Last updated 18 November 2026

Playing Record
Format	M	W	L	T	NR	Inaugural Match
One-Day Internationals	16	3	13	0	0	24 March 2024
Twenty20 Internationals	82	51	28	1	2	7 July 2018

=== One-Day Internationals ===
- Highest team total: 196 v. Scotland on 6 August 2024 at Sportpark Maarschalkerweerd, Utrecht.
- Highest individual score: 80*, Tanya Ruma v. United States on 11 April 2024 at ICC Academy Ground, Dubai.
- Best innings bowling: 4/19, Vicky Ara'a v. Zimbabwe on 26 March 2024 at Harare Sports Club, Harare.

ODI record versus other nations

Records complete to WODI #1559. Last updated 17 August 2026.

Opponent	M	W	L	T	NR	First match	First win
ICC Full Members
Zimbabwe	3	0	3	0	0	24 March 2024	
ICC Associate members
Netherlands	2	0	2	0	0	5 August 2024	
Scotland	3	0	3	0	0	12 April 2024	
Thailand	3	0	3	0	0	13 August 2026	
United Arab Emirates	4	2	2	0	0	13 October 2025	15 October 2025
United States	1	1	0	0	0	11 April 2024	11 April 2024

=== Twenty20 International ===
- Highest team total: 224/1 v. Philippines on 10 September 2025 at Albert Park Ground 2, Suva.
- Highest individual innings: 130*, Konio Oala v. Philippines on 10 September 2025 at Albert Park Ground 2, Suva.
- Best innings bowling: 5/1, Pauke Siaka v. Philippines on 10 September 2025 at Albert Park Ground 2, Suva.

Most T20I runs for PNG Women

Player	Runs	Average	Career span
Brenda Tau	1,394	25.81	2019–2026
Naoani Vare	1,335	24.27	2019–2026
Tanya Ruma	1,316	31.33	2019–2026
Sibona Jimmy	764	14.69	2019–2026
Pauke Siaka	591	15.97	2018–2026

Most T20I wickets for PNG Women

Player	Wickets	Average	Career span
Kaia Arua	59	10.20	2019–2024
Isabel Toua	56	13.62	2018–2026
Sibona Jimmy	52	15.82	2019–2026
Ravina Oa	49	10.40	2019–2023
Henao Thomas	44	17.61	2019–2026

T20I record versus other nations

Records complete to WT20I #3079. Last updated 18 November 2026.

Opponent	M	W	L	T	NR	First match	First win
ICC Full members
Bangladesh	3	0	3	0	0	7 July 2018	
Ireland	4	0	4	0	0	12 July 2018	
Sri Lanka	1	0	1	0	0	15 November 2026	
Zimbabwe	4	0	3	1	0	18 September 2022	
ICC Associate members
Cook Islands	2	2	0	0	0	2 September 2023	2 September 2023
Fiji	8	8	0	0	0	7 May 2019	7 May 2019
Indonesia	3	3	0	0	0	6 May 2019	6 May 2019
Japan	3	3	0	0	0	9 May 2019	9 May 2019
Namibia	3	3	0	0	0	15 November 2025	15 November 2025
Netherlands	3	2	0	0	1	10 July 2018	10 July 2018
Philippines	1	1	0	0	0	10 September 2025	10 September 2025
Samoa	13	10	3	0	0	10 May 2019	10 May 2019
Scotland	7	2	5	0	0	14 July 2018	1 September 2019
Tanzania	1	1	0	0	0	30 November 2025	30 November 2025
Thailand	6	2	4	0	0	5 September 2019	21 November 2025
Uganda	1	0	1	0	0	25 November 2025	25 November 2025
United Arab Emirates	4	3	1	0	0	8 July 2018	8 July 2018
United States	3	2	1	0	0	3 September 2019	3 September 2019
Vanuatu	12	10	1	0	1	6 May 2019	6 May 2019

== See also ==
- List of Papua New Guinea women ODI cricketers
- List of Papua New Guinea women Twenty20 International cricketers
