= Tanya Ruma =

Papua New Guinean cricketer

Personal information
- Full name: Tanya Ruma
- Born: 25 May 1993 (age 33)
- Batting: Right-handed
- Bowling: Right-arm medium

International information
- National side: Papua New Guinea
- ODI debut (cap 5): 24 March 2024 v Zimbabwe
- Last ODI: 11 August 2024 v Scotland
- T20I debut (cap 7): 7 July 2018 v Bangladesh
- Last T20I: 15 August 2024 v Scotland
Medal record
Representing Papua New Guinea
Women's Cricket
Pacific Games
| Silver medal – second place | 2019 Apia | Twenty20 International |
- Source: Cricinfo, 7 October 2024

Tanya Ruma (born 25 May 1993) is a Papua New Guinean cricketer. She played for the Papua New Guinea women's national cricket team in the 2017 Women's Cricket World Cup Qualifier in February 2017.

In June 2018, she was named in Papua New Guinea's squad for the 2018 ICC Women's World Twenty20 Qualifier tournament. She made her Women's Twenty20 International (WT20I) debut against Bangladesh in the World Twenty20 Qualifier on 7 July 2018.

In April 2019, she was named in Papua New Guinea's squad for the 2019 ICC Women's Qualifier EAP tournament in Vanuatu. In August 2019, she was named as the vice-captain of Papua New Guinea's squad for the 2019 ICC Women's World Twenty20 Qualifier tournament in Scotland. She was named, in October 2019, in the Women's Global Development Squad, ahead of a five-match series in Australia, and in October 2021, in the national women's team for the 2021 Women's Cricket World Cup Qualifier tournament in Zimbabwe.
