= Selina Solman =

Vanuatuan cricketer

Personal information
- Full name: Selina Solman
- Born: 8 February 1994 (age 32)
- Batting: Right-handed
- Bowling: Right-arm medium
- Role: All-rounder

International information
- National side: Vanuatu (2019-present)
- T20I debut (cap 9): 6 May 2019 v PNG
- Last T20I: 6 October 2022 v PNG

Career statistics
Competition	WT20I
Matches	39
Runs scored	465
Batting average	18.69
100s/50s	0/1
Top score	50*
Balls bowled	745
Wickets	43
Bowling average	13.83
5 wickets in innings	1
10 wickets in match	0
Best bowling	5/9
Catches/stumpings	15/–
Medal record
Representing Vanuatu
Women's Cricket
Pacific Games
Bronze medal – third place	2019 Apia	Twenty20 International
- Source: Cricinfo, 7 October 2024

Selina Solman (born 8 February 1994) is a Vanuatuan cricketer and the current captain of the Vanuatu women's cricket team. She was the first female cricketer from Vanuatu to play grade cricket in Australia. She also played for the East Asia-Pacific team in the Australian Country Cricket Championships, with the International Cricket Council (ICC) calling her a "crucial player for the team".

In April 2019, she was named as the captain of Vanuatu's squad for the 2019 ICC Women's Qualifier EAP tournament, also held in Vanuatu. She made her Women's Twenty20 International (WT20I) debut against Papua New Guinea in the Women's Qualifier EAP tournament on 6 May 2019.

Solman has also represented Vanuatu in netball at the 2017 Pacific Mini Games, becoming one of the few dual sport representatives for the nation internationally.

On 19 January 2024, Solman became the first player from Vanuatu to take a Women's Twenty20 International five-wicket haul with 5/9 against the Cook Islands at the Women's T20I Pacific Cup in Auckland, New Zealand.
