= Naoani Vare =

Papua New Guinean cricketer (born 1998)

Personal information
- Full name: Naoani Vare
- Born: 28 May 1998 (age 28)
- Batting: Right-handed
- Bowling: Right-arm medium

International information
- National side: Papua New Guinea
- ODI debut (cap 11): 24 March 2024 v Zimbabwe
- Last ODI: 11 August 2024 v Scotland
- T20I debut (cap 12): 8 July 2018 v UAE
- Last T20I: 26 November 2025 v Scotland
Medal record
Representing Papua New Guinea
Women's Cricket
Pacific Games
Silver medal – second place	2019 Apia	Twenty20 International
- Source: Cricinfo, 26 November 2025

Naoani Vare (born 28 May 1998) is a Papua New Guinean cricketer. In July 2018, she was named in Papua New Guinea's squad for the 2018 ICC Women's World Twenty20 Qualifier tournament. She made her Women's Twenty20 International (WT20I) against the United Arab Emirates in the World Twenty20 Qualifier on 8 July 2018.

In April 2019, she was named in Papua New Guinea's squad for the 2019 ICC Women's Qualifier EAP tournament in Vanuatu. In August 2019, she was named in Papua New Guinea's squad for the 2019 ICC Women's World Twenty20 Qualifier tournament in Scotland. In October 2021, she was named in Papua New Guinea's team for the 2021 Women's Cricket World Cup Qualifier tournament in Zimbabwe.
