= Brenda Tau =

Papua New Guinean cricketer

Personal information
- Full name: Brenda Tau
- Born: 17 June 1998 (age 28)
- Batting: Left-handed
- Role: Wicket-keeper

International information
- National side: Papua New Guinea
- ODI debut (cap 7): 24 March 2024 v Zimbabwe
- Last ODI: 11 August 2024 v Scotland
- T20I debut (cap 9): 7 July 2018 v Bangladesh
- Last T20I: 15 August 2024 v Scotland
Medal record
Representing Papua New Guinea
Women's Cricket
Pacific Games
Silver medal – second place	2019 Apia	Twenty20 International
- Source: Cricinfo, 7 October 2024

Brenda Tau (born 17 June 1998) is a Papua New Guinean cricketer. She played for the Papua New Guinea women's national cricket team in the 2017 Women's Cricket World Cup Qualifier in February 2017. In the tournament, she was the highest run-scorer for Papua New Guinea, with 85 runs.

In June 2018, she was named in Papua New Guinea's squad for the 2018 ICC Women's World Twenty20 Qualifier tournament. She made her Women's Twenty20 International (WT20I) against Bangladesh in the World Twenty20 Qualifier on 7 July 2018. She was the leading run-scorer for Papua New Guinea in the tournament, with 82 runs in five matches.

She was named in Papua New Guinea's squad for the both 2019 ICC Women's Qualifier EAP tournament in Vanuatu, and the 2019 ICC Women's World Twenty20 Qualifier tournament in Scotland. In October 2021, she was named in Papua New Guinea's team for the 2021 Women's Cricket World Cup Qualifier tournament in Zimbabwe.
