= Isabel Toua =

Papua New Guinean cricketer (born 1995)

Personal information
- Full name: Isabel Toua
- Born: 17 July 1995 (age 31)
- Batting: Right-handed
- Bowling: Right-arm medium

International information
- National side: Papua New Guinea
- ODI debut (cap 10): 24 March 2024 v Zimbabwe
- Last ODI: 11 August 2024 v Scotland
- T20I debut (cap 11): 7 July 2018 v Bangladesh
- Last T20I: 15 August 2024 v Scotland
Medal record
Representing Papua New Guinea
Women's Cricket
Pacific Games
Silver medal – second place	2019 Apia	Twenty20 International
- Source: Cricinfo, 7 October 2024

Isabel Toua (born 17 July 1995) is a Papua New Guinean cricketer. In July 2018, she was named in Papua New Guinea's squad for the 2018 ICC Women's World Twenty20 Qualifier tournament. She made her Women's Twenty20 International (WT20I) debut against Bangladesh in the World Twenty20 Qualifier on 7 July 2018.

In August 2019, she was named in Papua New Guinea's squad for the 2019 ICC Women's World Twenty20 Qualifier tournament in Scotland. In October 2021, she was named in Papua New Guinea's team for the 2021 Women's Cricket World Cup Qualifier tournament in Zimbabwe.
