= List of Vanuatu women Twenty20 International cricketers =

This is a list of Vanuatu women Twenty20 International cricketers. A Twenty20 International (T20I) is an international cricket match between two representative teams, each having T20I status, as determined by the International Cricket Council (ICC). A T20I is played under the rules of Twenty20 cricket.

This list includes names of all players who have played at least one T20I match and is initially arranged in the order of debut appearance. Where more than one player won their first cap in the same match, their names are initially listed alphabetically at the time of debut.

== Key ==
General

- ‡ – Captain
- † – Wicket-keeper
- First – Year of debut
- Last – Year of latest game
- Mat – Number of matches played

Batting

- Runs – Runs scored in career
- HS – Highest score
- 50 – Number of half-centuries scored
- 100 – Centuries scored
- Avg – Runs scored per dismissal
- * – Batsman remained not out

Bowling

- Wkt – Wickets taken in career
- BBI – Best bowling in an innings
- Ave – Average runs per wicket

Fielding

- Ca – Catches taken
- St – Stumpings affected

== Players ==
Statistics are correct as of 30 April 2026.

Vanuatu women T20I cricketers
General					Batting					Bowling				Fielding		Ref
No.	Name	First	Last	Mat	Runs	HS	Avg	50	100	Balls	Wkt	BBI	Ave	Ca	St	Ref
1	Rachel Andrew‡	2019	2026	61	1281	106*	24.63	4	1	1,129	57	3/7	16.36	22	0	
2	Maiyllise Carlot†	2019	2024	26	59	15	4.91	0	0	–	–	–	–	5	2	
3	Alvina Chilia	2019	2026	59	327	30	9.34	0	0	339	15	3/8	18.73	1	0	
4	Melissa Fare	2019	2026	20	31	9	6.20	0	0	54	3	2/5	26.66	2	0	
5	Valenta Langiatu	2019	2026	61	1,154	87*	19.89	7	0	190	11	3/6	14.45	10	0	
6	Vicky Mansale	2019	2025	47	71	10*	4.43	0	0	612	34	4/15	16.97	18	0	
7	Nasimana Navaika	2019	2026	56	707	47*	18.12	0	0	1,037	67	4/10	14.19	17	0	
8	Johanna Sokomanu	2019	2019	8	8	4*	0 4.00	0	0	–	–	–	–	2	0	
9	Selina Solman‡	2019	2026	54	730	56*	21.47	2	0	997	56	5/9	14.89	20	0	
10	Mahina Tarimiala†	2019	2026	46	61	14	6.10	0	0	–	–	–	–	16	12	
11	Leimara Tastuki	2019	2023	23	158	25	10.53	0	0	399	18	3/9	15.88	4	0	
12	Marcelina Mete	2019	2023	8	3	2	0.75	0	0	102	10	3/26	6.30	3	0	
13	Valentina Tari	2019	2019	3	3	3	3.00	0	0	6	0	–	–	0	0	
14	Shania Kenni	2019	2019	1	–	–	–	–	–	–	–	–	–	0	0	
15	Leimauri Chilia	2019	2025	26	182	44	11.37	0	0	66	1	1/17	67.00	3	0	
16	Merielle Kenni	2019	2019	4	1	1	0.50	0	0	–	–	–	–	0	0	
17	Netty Chilia	2022	2023	11	8	3*	4.00	0	0	60	5	3/7	11.20	5	0	
18	Ruth Kaltongga	2022	2022	5	6	6	6.00	0	0	18	0	–	–	0	0	
19	Rayline Ova	2022	2026	31	59	13	3.68	0	0	332	21	5/14	11.57	9	0	
20	Leisau Jacob	2022	2023	2	1	1*	–	0	0	–	–	–	–	0	0	
21	Theresa Mansale	2022	2023	2	8	8	8.00	0	0	–	–	–	–	0	0	
22	Lizzing Enoch	2022	2024	3	1	1	1.00	0	0	6	1	1/6	6.00	0	0	
23	Gillian Chilia†	2023	2026	29	98	21*	8.90	0	0	25	2	2/1	13.00	10	1	
24	Tina Kalosin	2023	2023	4	1	1	1.00	0	0	12	0	–	–	1	0	
25	Louise Tastuki	2023	2023	1	3	3*	–	0	0	–	–	–	–	0	0	
26	Vanessa Vira	2023	2026	36	47	10*	5.87	0	0	741	47	3/8	11.29	7	0	
27	Natalia Kakor	2024	2026	13	11	5*	11.00	0	0	144	5	1/7	34.20	2	0	
28	Susan Stephen†	2025	2026	21	191	51	12.73	1	0	108	1	1/18	119.00	5	0	
29	Naitha Simelum	2025	2025	2	7	7*	–	0	0	–	–	–	–	0	0	
30	Anna Griffin	2025	2026	8	15	7	3.00	0	0	–	–	–	–	1	0	

Note: The following match includes one or more missing catchers in the Cricinfo scorecard and hence statistics (as of 31 December 2019):

- vs. Fiji (9 July 2019); 1 missing catch
