= Vanuatu women's national cricket team =

Cricket team

Vanuatu
- Vanuatu Cricket Association logo
- Association: Vanuatu Cricket Association

Personnel
- Captain: Selina Solman

International Cricket Council
- ICC status: Associate member (2009); Affiliate member (1995)
- ICC region: East Asia-Pacific
ICC Rankings	Current	Best-ever
T20I	33rd	27th (2 Jun 2019)

International cricket
- First international: v. Fiji at Port Vila; 11 April 2011

T20 Internationals
- First T20I: v. Papua New Guinea at Independence Park, Port Vila; 6 May 2019
- Last T20I: v. Nepal at Gahanga International Cricket Stadium, Kigali; 30 April 2026
T20Is	Played	Won/Lost
Total	61	33/26 (0 ties, 2 no results)
This year	8	1/7 (0 ties, 0 no results)
T20I kit
- As of 30 April 2026

The Vanuatu women's national cricket team represents Vanuatu in international women's cricket. It is organised by the game's governing body in the country, the Vanuatu Cricket Association (VCA), which is an associate member of the International Cricket Council (ICC).

Having made its international debut the previous year, against Fiji, Vanuatu first participated in an international tournament at the 2012 ICC East Asia-Pacific regional qualifiers for the World Twenty20, winning two matches and placing fourth out of six teams. At the 2014 edition of the same tournament, they finished last, with only a single win (against the Cook Islands). Vanuatu's next major event was the women's tournament at the 2015 Pacific Games in Port Moresby, Papua New Guinea.

In April 2018, the ICC granted full Women's Twenty20 International (WT20I) status to all its members. Therefore, all Twenty20 matches played between Vanuatu women and any ICC member since 1 July 2018 have the full WT20I status.

== History ==
"Traditional cricket", similar to the kilikiti played in Samoa, has long been popular amongst Ni-Vanuatu women, but the standard version of the sport was only popularised in the late 2000s, with the backing of the Vanuatu Cricket Association (VCA) and the ICC East Asia-Pacific development programme. Vanuatu made its international debut in April 2011, hosting a tri-series against Fiji and a team from the North Coast region of the Australian state of New South Wales. In May 2012, the country hosted the 2012 East Asia-Pacific Women's Championship. The tournament was played using the Twenty20 format, with the winner progressing to the 2013 World Twenty20 Qualifier in Ireland. Vanuatu joined the three teams from the previous 2010 tournament – Japan, Papua New Guinea, and Samoa – as well as the Cook Islands and Fiji. In the round-robin stage, Vanuatu recorded wins against Fiji and the Cook Islands, finishing fourth in the table. In the third-place playoff against Samoa, they lost by eight wickets.

At the 2014 EAP Women's Championship in Japan (a qualifier for the 2015 World Twenty20 Qualifier), Vanuatu again placed fourth in the group stages, though out of five rather than six teams (Fiji having dropped out). Their only win in the round-robin was by eight runs against the Cook Islands, but they were unable to repeat that in the fifth-place playoff, losing by six wickets to the same opposition. In April 2015, the New Caledonian national women's team toured Vanuatu, playing six matches against Vanuatu in Port Vila. The tour was part of both sides' preparation for the women's tournament at the 2015 Pacific Games in Port Moresby, Papua New Guinea. Vanuatu also played against a mixed men and women's side from the Melbourne Cricket Club (MCC) in the lead-up to the games.

In December 2020, the ICC announced the qualification pathway for the 2023 ICC Women's T20 World Cup. Vanuatu were named in the 2021 ICC Women's T20 World Cup EAP Qualifier regional group, alongside seven other teams.

In 2023, Vanuatu beat Papua New Guinea for the first time in their history at the 2023 ICC Women's T20 World Cup EAP Qualifier to ultimately qualify for the 2024 ICC Women's T20 World Cup Qualifier, where they would also earn a win over Zimbabwe.

On 19 January 2024, Rachel Andrew became the first player from Vanuatu to score a century in Women's Twenty20 International (WT20I), making 105 not out against the Cook Islands at the Women's T20I Pacific Cup in Auckland, New Zealand. In the same match, Selina Solman became the first player from the country to take a WT20I five wicket haul with 5/9.

== Tournament history ==
=== ICC Women's ODI World Cup ===
Women's Cricket World Cup records
Host Year	Round	Position	GP	W	L	T	NR
(England) 1973	Did not qualified						
(India) 1978	Did not qualified						
(New Zealand) 1982	Did not qualified						
(Australia) 1988	Did not qualified						
(England) 1993	Did not qualified						
(India) 1997	Did not qualified						
(New Zealand) 2000	Did not qualified						
(South Africa) 2005	Did not qualified						
(Australia) 2009	Did not qualified						
(India) 2013	Did not qualified						
(England) 2017	Did not qualified						
(New Zealand) 2022	Did not qualified						
(India) 2025	Did not qualified						
Total	0/13	0 Titles	0	0	0	0	0

=== ICC Women's Cricket World Cup Qualifier ===
ICC Women's Cricket World Cup Qualifier records
Host Year	Round	Position	GP	W	L	T	NR
(Netherlands) 2003	Did not qualify						
(South Africa) 2008	Did not qualify						
(Bangladesh) 2011	Did not qualify						
(Sri Lanka) 2017	Did not qualify						
(Zimbabwe) 2021	Did not qualify						
(Pakistan) 2025	Did not qualify						
Total	0/5	0 Title	0	0	0	0	0

=== ICC Women's Twenty20 World Cup ===
Twenty20 World Cup records
Host/Year	Round	Position	GP	W	L	T	NR
(England) 2009	Did not qualify						
(Cricket West Indies) 2010	Did not qualify						
(Sri Lanka) 2012	Did not qualify						
(Bangladesh) 2014	Did not qualify						
(India) 2016	Did not qualify						
(Cricket West Indies) 2018	Did not qualify						
(Australia) 2020	Did not qualify						
(South Africa) 2023	Did not qualify						
(United Arab Emirates) 2024	Did not qualify						
(England) 2026	To be determined						
Total	0/10	0 Titles	0	0	0	0	0

=== ICC Women's World Twenty20 Global Qualifier ===
ICC Women's World Twenty20 Qualifier records
Host Year	Round	Position	GP	W	L	T	NR
(Republic of Ireland) 2013	Did not qualify						
(Thailand) 2015	Did not qualify						
(Netherlands) 2018	Did not qualify						
(Scotland) 2019	Did not qualify						
(United Arab Emirates) 2022	Did not qualify						
(United Arab Emirates) 2024	Did not qualify						
(Nepal) 2026	To be determined						
Total	0/6	0 Titles	0	0	0	0	0

=== ICC Women's T20 Champions Trophy ===
ICC Women's T20 Champions Trophy records
Host Year	Round	Position	GP	W	L	T	NR
(Sri Lanka) 2027	To be determined						
2031	To be determined						
Total	–	0 Title	0	0	0	0	0

=== ICC Women's World Twenty20 East Asia Pacific Qualifiers ===
ICC Women's World Twenty20 Qualifier East Asia Pacific records
Host/Year	Round	Position	GP	W	L	T	NR
(Vanuatu) 2019	Round-robin	3/6	5	3	2	0	0
(Samoa) 2021	Tournament did not held due to COVID-19 pandemic						
(Vanuatu) 2023	Qualified	1/7	6	6	0	0	0
(Fiji) 2025	Runners-up; DNQ	2/8	5	4	1	0	0
Total	3/3	1 Title	16	13	3	0	0

=== Pacific Games ===
Cricket at the Pacific Games records
Host/Year	Round	Position	GP	W	L	T	NR
(Papua New Guinea) 2015	3rd-place	4/6	7	3	4	0	0
(Samoa) 2019	3rd-place	3/4	7	3	4	0	0
Total	2/2	0 Titles	14	6	8	0	0

=== Women's T20I Pacific Cup ===
Women's T20I Pacific Cup records
Host/Year	Round	Position	GP	W	L	T	NR
(Vanuatu) 2022	Round-robin	2/4	6	3	2	0	1
(New Zealand) 2024	Round-robin	3/6	6	4	2	0	0
Total	2/2	0 Titles	12	7	4	0	1

=== East Asia Pacific Women's Championship ===
East Asia Pacific Women's Championship records
Host/Year	Round	Position	GP	W	L	T	NR
(Japan) 2010	The full information of the tournament have not found						
(Vanuatu) 2012	The full information of the tournament have not found						
(Japan) 2014	The full information of the tournament have not found						
(Samoa) 2016	The full information of the tournament have not found						
Total	4/4	0 Titles	0	0	0	0	0

== Current squad ==
Updated on 3 May 2024

This lists all the players who were named in the squad for 2024 ICC Women's T20 World Cup Qualifier.

Name	Age	Batting style	Bowling style	Notes
Batters
Valenta Langiatu	26	Right-handed	Right-arm medium	
Alvina Chilia	31	Right-handed	Right-arm medium	Vice-captain
Maiyllise Carlot	24	Right-handed		
Leimauri Chilia	29	Right-handed		
Gillian Chilia		Right-handed		
Susan Stephen		Right-handed	Right-arm medium	
All-rounders
Rachel Andrew	28	Right-handed	Right-arm medium	
Selina Solman	31	Right-handed	Right-arm medium	Captain
Nasimana Navaika	30	Right-handed	Right-arm leg break	
Wicket-keeper
Mahina Tarimiala	34	Right-handed		
Bowlers
Vicky Mansale	25	Right-handed	Right-arm medium	
Vanessa Vira	19	Right-handed	Right-arm off break	
Rayline Ova	25	Right-handed	Right-arm medium	
Lizzing Enoch	29	Right-handed		
Natalia Kakor		Right-handed	Right-arm off break	

== Records and statistics ==
International Match Summary — Vanuatu Women

Last updated 30 April 2026

Playing Record
Format	M	W	L	T	NR	Inaugural Match
Twenty20 Internationals	61	33	26	0	2	6 May 2019

=== Twenty20 International ===
- Highest team total: 177/1 v. Cook Islands on 19 January 2024 at Lloyd Elsmore Park 1, Auckland.
- Highest individual innings: 106*, Rachel Andrew v. Cook Islands on 19 January 2024 at Lloyd Elsmore Park 1, Auckland.
- Best innings bowling: 5/9, Selina Solman v. Cook Islands on 19 January 2024 at Lloyd Elsmore Park 1, Auckland.

Most T20I runs for Vanuatu Women

Player	Runs	Average	Career span
Rachel Andrew	1,281	24.63	2019–2026
Valenta Langiatu	1,154	19.89	2019–2026
Selina Solman	730	21.47	2019–2026
Nasimana Navaika	707	18.12	2019–2026
Alvina Chilia	327	9.34	2019–2026

Most T20I wickets for Vanuatu Women

Player	Wickets	Average	Career span
Nasimana Navaika	67	14.19	2019–2026
Rachel Andrew	57	16.36	2019–2026
Selina Solman	56	14.89	2019–2026
Vanessa Vira	47	11.29	2023–2026
Vicky Mansale	34	16.97	2019–2025

T20I record versus other nations

Records complete to WT20I #2751. Last updated 30 April 2026.

Opponent	M	W	L	T	NR	First match	First win
ICC Full Members
Ireland	1	0	1	0	0	1 May 2024	
Zimbabwe	1	1	0	0	0	25 April 2024	25 April 2024
ICC Associate members
Cook Islands	3	3	0	0	0	4 September 2023	4 September 2023
Fiji	12	12	0	0	0	7 May 2019	7 May 2019
France	1	1	0	0	0	11 March 2025	11 March 2025
Indonesia	3	3	0	0	0	9 May 2019	9 May 2019
Italy	2	0	2	0	0	21 April 2026	
Japan	5	5	0	0	0	10 May 2019	10 May 2019
Nepal	2	1	1	0	0	24 April 2026	24 April 2026
Netherlands	1	0	1	0	0	27 April 2024	
Papua New Guinea	12	1	10	0	1	6 May 2019	1 September 2023
Rwanda	2	0	2	0	0	19 April 2026	
Samoa	13	6	6	0	1	9 May 2019	3 October 2022
United Arab Emirates	1	0	1	0	0	3 May 2024	
United States	2	0	2	0	0	22 April 2026	

== See also ==
- List of Vanuatu women Twenty20 International cricketers
