= Samoa women's national cricket team =

Cricket team

Samoa
- Cricket Samoa logo
- Nickname: Nafanua
- Association: Samoa International Cricket Association

Personnel
- Captain: Kolotita Nonu
- Coach: Gary Wood

International Cricket Council
- ICC status: Associate member (2017); Affiliate member (2000)
- ICC region: East Asia-Pacific
ICC Rankings	Current	Best-ever
T20I	49th	16th (2 Oct 2020)

International cricket
- First international: v. Fiji at Apia; 2 February 2010

T20 Internationals
- First T20I: v. Fiji at Independence Park, Port Vila; 6 May 2019
- Last T20I: v. Fiji at Albert Park Ground 1, Suva; 15 September 2025
T20Is	Played	Won/Lost
Total	47	23/22 (0 ties, 2 no results)
This year	0	0/0 (0 ties, 0 no results)
T20I kit
- As of 15 September 2025

The Samoa women's national cricket team, nicknamed the Nafanua, represents Samoa in international women's cricket. It is organised by the game's governing body in the country, the Samoa International Cricket Association (SICA).

Although women's cricket has a long history in Samoa, the national team was only formally organised in 2010, with assistance from a New Zealand association, Auckland Cricket. The team has often included Samoan expatriate players based in Australia and New Zealand (including some who have played for state or provincial teams), which has presented difficulties in training. Samoa's first regional tournament came later in 2010, and it has since regularly participated in ICC East Asia-Pacific events, generally ranking behind only Japan and Papua New Guinea in the region. The women's team's most notable achievement has been winning the gold medal in the women's tournament at the 2015 Pacific Games. The team is currently coached by Ian West, an Englishman who gained Samoan citizenship through his wife, and subsequently played for the Samoan men's team.

In April 2018, the International Cricket Council (ICC) granted full Women's Twenty20 International (WT20I) status to all its members. Therefore, all Twenty20 matches played between Samoa women and another international side since 1 July 2018 have the full WT20I status.

== History ==
Cricket has been played in Samoa since the 19th century, when it was introduced by British traders and missionaries. It flourished despite a ban during the period of the German protectorate, from 1900 to 1914. Historically, the sport has been most popular when played under the modified rules known as kilikiti. However, since the early 2000s, when Samoa gained affiliate membership of the International Cricket Council (ICC) and its men's national team debuted internationally (in 2000 and 2001, respectively), the standard form of cricket has begun to replace kilikiti in popularity.

The Samoan women's team played its first international matches in February 2010, when Fiji toured to play a three-match series at Apia's Faleata Oval (in the Tuanaimato area). Fiji were also playing their first internationals. A major impetus for the establishment of a woman's team was its status as a requirement for associate membership of the ICC, to which SICA aspires. Samoa, captained by Perelini Mulitalo, went on to win the series 3–0, and consequently qualified as the third team (after Japan and Papua New Guinea) for the 2010 EAP Trophy in Japan, the team's first major tournament.

Samoa went on to lose all three of its matches at the EAP Trophy, a 50-over tournament, with their closest game being a 12-run loss to Japan in the qualifying final. Their captain there was Mindy Hodgson, a former representative of the Wellington Blaze in New Zealand domestic cricket. However, the Samoans were more successful at their next regional tournament, the 2012 EAP Women's Championship in Port Vila, Vanuatu. That tournament was played using the Twenty20 format, with the winner progressing to the 2013 World Twenty20 Qualifier in Ireland). The three teams from the 2010 tournament were joined by the Cook Islands, Fiji, and Vanuatu. Samoa won all of its group-stage matches (played only against the three newcomers), but lost in the semi-final against Papua New Guinea, eventually placing third after defeating Vanuatu in the third-place playoff.

At the 2014 EAP Women's Championship in Japan (a qualifier for the 2015 World Twenty20 Qualifier), Samoa again placed third after losing a semi-final to Papua New Guinea, with their opponent in the third-place playoff being the Cook Islands. The team's tournament was marked by several instances of individual brilliance, most notably an innings of 104 (off 74 balls) by Moelagi Tuilagi in the playoff, the first century in an EAP Twenty20 event. Samoa's captain, Auckland Hearts player Regina Lili'i, was named both player of the tournament and captain of the team of the tournament. Lili'i was one of three Samoan players with experience in the New Zealand State League, the others being Hana Mauafu (Canterbury Magicians) and Madeleine Chapman (Wellington Blaze). As of May 2015, one unofficial ranking system placed Samoa 27th in the world, behind Kenya. In July 2015, Samoa won the gold medal in the women's tournament at the 2015 Pacific Games in Port Moresby, becoming the first country outside of Papua New Guinea to win gold in Pacific Games cricket.

In December 2020, the ICC announced the qualification pathway for the 2023 ICC Women's T20 World Cup. Samoa were named in the 2021 ICC Women's T20 World Cup EAP Qualifier regional group, alongside seven other teams.

== Tournament history ==
=== ICC Women's ODI World Cup ===
Women's Cricket World Cup records
Host Year	Round	Position	GP	W	L	T	NR
(England) 1973	Did not qualify/No Women's ODI status						
(India) 1978	Did not qualify/No Women's ODI status						
(New Zealand) 1982	Did not qualify/No Women's ODI status						
(Australia) 1988	Did not qualify/No Women's ODI status						
(England) 1993	Did not qualify/No Women's ODI status						
(India) 1997	Did not qualify/No Women's ODI status						
(New Zealand) 2000	Did not qualify/No Women's ODI status						
(South Africa) 2005	Did not qualify/No Women's ODI status						
(Australia) 2009	Did not qualify/No Women's ODI status						
(India) 2013	Did not qualify/No Women's ODI status						
(England) 2017	Did not qualify/No Women's ODI status						
(New Zealand) 2022	Did not qualify/No Women's ODI status						
(India) 2025	Did not qualify/No Women's ODI status						
Total	0/13	0 Titles	0	0	0	0	0

=== ICC Women's Cricket World Cup Qualifier ===
ICC Women's Cricket World Cup Qualifier records
Host Year	Round	Position	GP	W	L	T	NR
(Netherlands) 2003	Did not qualify/No ODI status						
(South Africa) 2008	Did not qualify/No ODI status						
(Bangladesh) 2011	Did not qualify/No ODI status						
(Sri Lanka) 2017	Did not qualify/No ODI status						
(Zimbabwe) 2021	Did not qualify/No ODI status						
(Pakistan) 2025	Did not qualify/No ODI status						
Total	0/6	0 Title	0	0	0	0	0

=== ICC Women's World T20 ===
Twenty20 World Cup records
Host Year	Round	Position	GP	W	L	T	NR
(England) 2009	Did not qualify						
(Cricket West Indies) 2010	Did not qualify						
(Sri Lanka) 2012	Did not qualify						
(Bangladesh) 2014	Did not qualify						
(India) 2016	Did not qualify						
(Cricket West Indies) 2018	Did not qualify						
(Australia) 2020	Did not qualify						
(South Africa) 2023	Did not qualify						
(United Arab Emirates) 2024	Did not qualify						
(England) 2026	To be determined						
Total	0/9	0 Titles	0	0	0	0	0

=== ICC Women's Twenty20 Global Qualifier ===
ICC Women's World Twenty20 Qualifier records
Host Year	Round	Position	GP	W	L	T	NR
(Republic of Ireland) 2013	Did not qualify						
(Thailand) 2015	Did not qualify						
(Netherlands) 2018	Did not qualify						
(Scotland) 2019	Did not qualify						
(United Arab Emirates) 2022	Did not qualify						
(United Arab Emirates) 2024	Did not qualify						
(Nepal) 2026	Did not qualify						
Total	0/7	0 Titles	0	0	0	0	0

=== Cricket at Summer Olympics Games ===
Cricket at Summer Olympics records
Host Year	Round	Position	GP	W	L	T	NR
(United States) 2028	To be determined						
(Australia) 2032	To be determined						
Total	–	0 Title	0	0	0	0	0

=== ICC Women's T20 Champions Trophy ===
ICC Women's T20 Champions Trophy records
Host Year	Round	Position	GP	W	L	T	NR
(Sri Lanka) 2027	To be determined						
2031	To be determined						
Total	–	0 Title	0	0	0	0	0

=== EAP Women's Championship ===
EAP Women's Championship records
Host/Year	Round	Position	GP	W	L	T	NR
(Japan) 2010	Round-robin	3/3	The full information of the tournament have not found				
(Vanuatu) 2010	Round-robin	3/6	The full information of the tournament have not found				
(Japan) 2014	Round-robin	3/5	The full information of the tournament have not found				
(Samoa) 2016	Round-robin	2/3	The full information of the tournament have not found				
Total	4/4	0 Titles	0	0	0	0	0

=== Cricket at the Pacific Games ===
Pacific Games record
Year	Round	Position	GP	W	L	T	NR
(Papua New Guinea) 2015	Champion	1/6	6	6	0	0	0
(Samoa) 2019	Champion	1/4	7	6	1	0	0
Total	2/2	2 Titles	13	12	1	0	0

=== ICC Women's Twenty20 World Cup East Asia Pacific Qualifier ===
ICC Women's Twenty20 World Cup Qualifier East Asia Pacific records
Year	Round	Position	GP	W	L	T	NR
(Vanuatu) 2019	Runners-up	2/6	5	4	1	0	0
(Samoa) 2021	The tournament had been cancelled due to the COVID-19 pandemic						
(Vanuatu) 2023	Round-robin	5/7	6	1	5	0	0
(Fiji) 2025	6th-place	6/8	5	3	2	0	0
Total	3/3	0 Titles	16	8	8	0	0

== Current squad ==
Updated on 12 January 2024.

This lists all the players who have played for Samoa in the past 12 months or were part of the most recent squad.

Name	Age	Batting style	Bowling style	Notes
Batters
Fa'aiuga Sisifo	23	Right-handed	Right-arm medium	
Leitu Leong	24	Right-handed		
Regina Lili'i	40	Right-handed	Right-arm medium	Captain
All-rounders
Jacinta Sanele	21	Right-handed	Right-arm medium	
Taalili Iosefo	21	Right-handed	Right-arm medium	
Tuaoloa Semau	45	Right-handed	Right-arm medium	
Lagi Telea	29	Right-handed	Right-arm medium	
Ailaoa Aoina	21	Left-handed	Left-arm medium	
Eleni Vaaetasi	29	Right-handed	Right-arm medium	
Aunoa Iopu	23	Right-handed	Right-arm off break	
Carol Agafili		Right-handed	Right-arm medium	
Wicketkeepers
Ruth Johnston	27	Right-handed	-	
Francesca Nafanua			-	
Bowlers
Ariota Kupito	23	Right-handed	Right-arm medium-fast	
Vicky Tafea	22	Right-handed	Right-arm medium	

== Records and statistics ==
International Match Summary — Samoa Women

Last updated 15 September 2025

Playing Record
Format	M	W	L	T	NR	Inaugural Match
Twenty20 Internationals	47	23	22	0	2	6 May 2019

=== Twenty20 International ===
- Highest team total: 174/4 v. Cook Islands on 13 September 2025 at Albert Park Ground 1, Suva.
- Highest individual innings: 60*, Taalili Iosefo v. Fiji on 11 March 2025 at N'Du Stadium, Nouméa.
- Best innings bowling: 6/8, Olive Lefaga v. France on 12 March 2025 at N'Du Stadium, Nouméa.

Most T20I runs for Samoa Women

Player	Runs	Average	Career span
Regina Lili'i	530	33.12	2019–2024
Taalili Iosefo	378	15.12	2019–2025
Fa'aiuga Sisifo	242	12.10	2019–2025
Jacinta Sanele	232	8.92	2022–2025
Kolotita Nonu	200	12.50	2019–2025

Most T20I wickets for Samoa Women

Player	Wickets	Average	Career span
Taalili Iosefo	47	12.46	2019–2025
Lagi Telea	40	9.52	2019–2024
Ailaoa Aoina	28	12.39	2022–2025
Jacinta Sanele	23	19.04	2022–2025
Olive Lefaga	18	10.77	2025–2025

T20I record versus other nations

Records complete to WT20I #2513. Last updated 15 September 2025.

Opponent	M	W	L	T	NR	First match	First win
ICC Associate members
Cook Islands	3	3	0	0	0	7 September 2023	7 September 2023
Fiji	11	7	3	0	1	6 May 2019	6 May 2019
France	1	1	0	0	0	12 March 2025	12 March 2025
Indonesia	2	1	1	0	0	7 May 2019	7 May 2019
Japan	3	1	2	0	0	7 May 2019	7 May 2019
Papua New Guinea	13	3	10	0	0	10 May 2019	11 July 2019
Philippines	1	1	0	0	0	9 September 2025	9 September 2025
Vanuatu	13	6	6	0	1	9 May 2019	9 May 2019

== See also ==
- List of Samoa women Twenty20 International cricketers
