= 2024 Kwibuka Women's T20 Tournament =

International cricket tournament

- Dates: 30 May – 8 June 2024
- Administrator: Rwanda Cricket Association
- Cricket format: Twenty20 International
- Tournament format(s): Round-robin and play-offs
- Host: Rwanda
- Champions: Uganda (3rd title)
- Runners-up: Zimbabwe A
- Participants: 8
- Matches: 32
- Player of the series: (Zimbabwe) Kelis Ndhlovu
- Most runs: (Zimbabwe) Kelis Ndhlovu (295)
- Most wickets: (Nigeria) Lillian Udeh (18)

The 2024 Kwibuka Women's T20 Tournament was a Twenty20 International (T20I) cricket tournament that took place in Rwanda from 30 May to 8 June 2024. It was the tenth edition of the annual Kwibuka T20 Tournament, which was first played in 2014 in remembrance of the victims of the 1994 genocide against the Tutsi. The participating teams were Botswana, Cameroon, Kenya, Malawi, Nigeria, Rwanda, Uganda and Zimbabwe A. The tournament consisted of a round-robin stage, after which the top two sides advanced to the final. Rwanda were the defending champions, having won the tournament for the first time in 2023.

A 12-run victory over Rwanda meant that Uganda were the first side to secure a place in the final, having won each of their first six matches. This result also meant that the hosts would have needed to beat Zimbabwe A in their last match in the round-robin to have a chance of making the final. Rwanda did manage to win the game, but the margin of victory was not quite enough to qualify for the final, with Zimbabwe advancing on net run rate.

Uganda beat Zimbabwe A by 2 runs in a tense low-scoring final. Rwanda beat Nigeria to claim third place, Kenya beat Botswana in the fifth-place play-off, and Malawi took seventh place ahead of Cameroon. Zimbabwe's Kelis Ndhlovu was named player of the tournament.

== Squads ==
Botswana	Cameroon	Kenya	Malawi	Nigeria	Rwanda	Uganda	Zimbabwe A
Tuelo Shadrack (c); Pako Mapotsane (vc); Kesego Inakale; Onneile Keitsemang; Oratile Kgeresi; Amantle Letuba; Goabilwe Matome; Entle Mmese; Amantle Mokgotlhe; Laura Mophakedi (wk); Shameelah Mosweu; Aliya Motorwala; Wendy Moutswi; Merapelo Phiase	Michelle Ekani (c, wk) (Note: Cynerah Mboe captained Cameroon in their second and third matches of the series.); Marguerite Bessala; Edwige Guehoada; Elsa Kana; Tchouabo Leslie; Cathy Mbelel; Bernadette Mbida; Cynerah Mboe; Catherine Messina; Jeanne Ngono; Sandra Nono; Olive Ranedoumoun; Madaleine Sissako; Brenda Waluma	Esther Wachira (c); Queentor Abel; Veronica Abuga; Judith Ajiambo; Lavendah Idambo; Marion Juma; Charity Muthoni (wk); Jemimah Ndanu; Flavia Odhiambo; Kelvia Ogola; Venasa Ooko; Mercy Sifuna; Edith Waithaka; Ann Wanjira	Vanessa Phiri (c); Allinafe Alfonso; Tricia Chabila; Sophina Chinawa; Ketrina Chingaipe; Lidia Dimba; Nellie Gamaliyele; Sugeni Kananji; Mercy Kudimba (wk); Triphonia Luka; Lucy Malino; Praise Maziya; Tadala Mpandakwaya	Favour Eseigbe (c); Abigail Igbobie (vc, wk); Shola Adekunle; Peculiar Agboya; Annointed Akhigbe; Christabel Chukwuonye; Sarah Etim (wk); Victory Igbinedion; Usen Peace; Lucky Piety; Rachael Samson; Esther Sandy; Salome Sunday; Lillian Udeh	Marie Bimenyimana (c); Alice Ikuzwe; Flora Irakoze (wk); Rosine Irera; Gisele Ishimwe; Henriette Ishimwe; Immaculee Muhawenimana; Belise Murekatete; Shakila Niyomuhoza; Josiane Nyirankundineza; Rosette Shimwamana; Clarrisse Umutoniwase; Geovanis Uwase; Merveille Uwase (wk)	Janet Mbabazi (c); Rita Musamali (vc); Asumin Akurut; Prosscovia Alako; Lorna Anyait; Malisa Ariokot; Concy Aweko; Kevin Awino (wk); Mohammed Jimia; Immaculate Nakisuuyi; Stephani Nampiina; Immaculate Nandera; Patricia Timong; Sarah Walaza	Chiedza Dhururu (c, wk); Beloved Biza; Olinder Chare; Kudzai Chigora; Buhlebenkosi Maposa; Lindrose Masina; Michelle Mavunga; Passionate Munorwei; Christine Mutasa; Vimbai Mutungwindu (wk); Kelis Ndhlovu; Runyararo Pasipanodya; Lorraine Pemhiwa; Loryn Phiri

== Round-robin ==
=== Points table ===
Pos	Team	Pld	W	L	NR	Pts	NRR	Qualification
1	Uganda	7	7	0	0	14	2.927	Advanced to the final
2	Zimbabwe A	7	5	2	0	10	2.062	Advanced to the final
3	Rwanda	7	5	2	0	10	1.946	Advanced to the 3rd place play-off
4	Nigeria	7	4	3	0	8	1.321	Advanced to the 3rd place play-off
5	Kenya	7	4	3	0	8	0.096	Advanced to the 5th place play-off
6	Botswana	7	2	5	0	4	−1.345	Advanced to the 5th place play-off
7	Malawi	7	1	6	0	2	−3.430	Advanced to the 7th place play-off
8	Cameroon	7	0	7	0	0	−3.923	Advanced to the 7th place play-off

Source: ESPNcricinfo

=== Fixtures ===
==== Day one ====
30 May 2024
09:15
Scorecard

Rwanda; 141/4 (20 overs)	v	Cameroon; 39 (13.1 overs)
Merveille Uwase 62* (51); Michelle Ekani 1/16 (3 overs)		Brenda Waluma 12 (11); Henriette Ishimwe 4/9 (3.1 overs)

Rwanda won by 102 runs
Gahanga International Cricket Stadium, Kigali
Umpires: Damascene Hagenimana (Rwa) and Veronique Iriho (Rwa)
Player of the match: Henriette Ishimwe (Rwa)

- Rwanda won the toss and elected to bat.
- Catherine Messina and Sandra Nono (Cmr) both made their T20I debuts.

30 May 2024
09:45
Scorecard

Zimbabwe A 183/5 (20 overs)	v	Malawi; 91/7 (20 overs)
Kelis Ndhlovu 48 (24); Lucy Malino 2/29 (4 overs)		Sophina Chinawa 22 (19); Kelis Ndhlovu 2/14 (4 overs)

Zimbabwe A won by 92 runs
Gahanga B Ground, Kigali
Umpires: Gasana Christian (Rwa) and Remy Singinzwa (Rwa)
Player of the match: Kelis Ndhlovu (Zim)

- Malawi won the toss and elected to field.

30 May 2024
13:15
Scorecard

Uganda; 140/6 (20 overs)	v	Botswana; 69/5 (20 overs)
Stephani Nampiina 42 (34); Goabilwe Matome 3/12 (4 overs)		Goabilwe Matome 16* (23); Concy Aweko 2/4 (2 overs)

Uganda won by 71 runs
Gahanga International Cricket Stadium, Kigali
Umpires: Veronique Iriho (Rwa) and Gaston Niyibizi (Rwa)
Player of the match: Janet Mbabazi (Uga)

- Uganda won the toss and elected to bat.
- Asumin Akurut (Uga) made her T20I debut.

==== Day two ====
31 May 2024
09:15
Scorecard

Zimbabwe A 151/6 (20 overs)	v	Kenya; 95/8 (20 overs)
Kelis Ndhlovu 56 (37); Ann Wanjira 2/13 (4 overs)		Venasa Ooko 23 (27); Olinder Chare 2/21 (4 overs); Kelis Ndhlovu 2/21 (4 overs)

Zimbabwe A won by 56 runs
Gahanga International Cricket Stadium, Kigali
Umpires: Gasana Christian (Rwa) and Gaston Niyibizi (Rwa)
Player of the match: Kelis Ndhlovu (Zim)

- Kenya won the toss and elected to field.

31 May 2024
09:45
Scorecard

Uganda; 97 (20 overs)	v	Nigeria; 86/8 (20 overs)
Immaculate Nakisuuyi 33 (42); Lillian Udeh 4/15 (4 overs)		Salome Sunday 36 (47); Immaculate Nakisuuyi 2/19 (4 overs)

Uganda won by 11 runs
Gahanga B Ground, Kigali
Umpires: Damascene Hagenimana (Rwa) and Tafadzwa Musakwa (Zim)
Player of the match: Immaculate Nakisuuyi (Uga)

- Nigeria won the toss and elected to field.
- Annointed Akhigbe (Nga) made her T20I debut.

31 May 2024
13:15
Scorecard

Botswana; 106/7 (20 overs)	v	Cameroon; 62/9 (20 overs)
Tuelo Shadrack 38* (56); Cynerah Mboe 2/12 (3 overs)		Marguerite Bessala 24* (29); Tuelo Shadrack 3/2 (4 overs)

Botswana won by 44 runs
Gahanga International Cricket Stadium, Kigali
Umpires: Gasana Christian (Rwa) and Remy Singinzwa (Rwa)
Player of the match: Tuelo Shadrack (Bot)

- Botswana won the toss and elected to bat.

31 May 2024
13:45
Scorecard

Malawi; 45 (16.1 overs)	v	Rwanda; 46/1 (5.5 overs)
Mercy Kudimba 13* (19); Marie Bimenyimana 5/3 (4 overs)		Gisele Ishimwe 27* (22); Ketrina Chingaipe 1/7 (2 overs)

Rwanda won by 9 wickets
Gahanga B Ground, Kigali
Umpires: Veronique Iriho (Rwa) and Temitope Onikoyi (Nga)
Player of the match: Marie Bimenyimana (Rwa)

- Malawi won the toss and elected to bat.
- Allinafe Alfonso and Praise Maziya (Mwi) both made their T20I debuts.
- Marie Bimenyimana (Rwa) took her first five-wicket haul in T20Is.

==== Day three ====
1 June 2024
09:15
Scorecard

Rwanda; 132/7 (20 overs)	v	Botswana; 58 (19.4 overs)
Shakila Niyomuhoza 46 (28); Tuelo Shadrack 3/5 (4 overs)		Shameelah Mosweu 10 (12); Henriette Ishimwe 3/9 (3.4 overs)

Rwanda won by 74 runs
Gahanga International Cricket Stadium, Kigali
Umpires: Veronique Iriho (Rwa) and Remy Singinzwa (Rwa)
Player of the match: Henriette Ishimwe (Rwa)

- Rwanda won the toss and elected to bat.

1 June 2024
09:45
Scorecard

Kenya; 106/8 (20 overs)	v	Malawi; 74/7 (20 overs)
Esther Wachira 24 (32); Lucy Malino 3/17 (4 overs)		Sophina Chinawa 15 (12); Flavia Odhiambo 3/8 (4 overs)

Kenya won by 32 runs
Gahanga B Ground, Kigali
Umpires: Damascene Hagenimana (Rwa) and Temitope Onikoyi (Nga)
Player of the match: Flavia Odhiambo (Ken)

- Kenya won the toss and elected to bat.

1 June 2024
13:15
Scorecard

Cameroon; 26 (18.2 overs)	v	Nigeria; 27/1 (3.5 overs)
Marguerite Bessala 7* (40); Lillian Udeh 4/7 (4 overs)		Esther Sandy 14 (10)

Nigeria won by 9 wickets
Gahanga International Cricket Stadium, Kigali
Umpires: Gaston Niyibizi (Rwa) and Remy Singinzwa (Rwa)
Player of the match: Lillian Udeh (Nga)

- Cameroon won the toss and elected to bat.

1 June 2024
13:45
Scorecard

Uganda; 165/2 (20 overs)	v	Zimbabwe A 90 (15.4 overs)
Prosscovia Alako 62* (41); Kelis Ndhlovu 1/21 (4 overs)		Christine Mutasa 15 (8); Kudzai Chigora (8); Sarah Walaza 3/4 (3 overs)

Uganda won by 75 runs
Gahanga B Ground, Kigali
Umpires: Gasana Christian (Rwa) and Damascene Hagenimana (Rwa)
Player of the match: Prosscovia Alako (Uga)

- Uganda won the toss and elected to bat.

==== Day four ====
2 June 2024
09:45
Scorecard

Kenya; 115/6 (20 overs)	v	Nigeria; 92 (15.1 overs)
Queentor Abel 60 (48); Lucky Piety 1/11 (2 overs)		Lillian Udeh 23 (18); Esther Wachira 3/10 (3.1 overs)

Kenya won by 23 runs
Gahanga B Ground, Kigali
Umpires: Gasana Christian (Rwa) and Temitope Onikoyi (Nga)
Player of the match: Queentor Abel (Ken)

- Nigeria won the toss and elected to field.

==== Day five ====
3 June 2024
09:15
Scorecard

Uganda; 118/8 (20 overs)	v	Malawi; 32 (12.2 overs)
Rita Musamali 55* (34); Vanessa Phiri 3/29 (4 overs)		Praise Maziya 10 (15); Patricia Timong 4/4 (4 overs)

Uganda won by 86 runs
Gahanga International Cricket Stadium, Kigali
Umpires: Gasana Christian (Rwa) and Temitope Onikoyi (Nga)
Player of the match: Patricia Timong (Uga)

- Uganda won the toss and elected to bat.
- Immaculate Nandera and Patricia Timong (Uga) both made their T20I debuts.

3 June 2024
09:45
Scorecard

Zimbabwe A 174/2 (20 overs)	v	Cameroon; 85/8 (20 overs)
Kelis Ndhlovu 99* (66); Michelle Ekani 2/23 (3 overs)		Tchouabo Leslie 19 (26); Michelle Mavunga 2/13 (3 overs)

Zimbabwe A won by 89 runs
Gahanga B Ground, Kigali
Umpires: Gaston Niyibizi (Rwa) and Tafadzwa Musakwa (Zim)
Player of the match: Kelis Ndhlovu (Zim)

- Zimbabwe A won the toss and elected to bat.

3 June 2024
13:15
Scorecard

Botswana; 56 (20 overs)	v	Nigeria; 59/1 (8.4 overs)
Laura Mophakedi 34 (47); Lucky Piety 3/14 (4 overs)		Lucky Piety 19* (15); Goabilwe Matome 1/24 (3 overs)

Nigeria won by 9 wickets
Gahanga International Cricket Stadium, Kigali
Umpires: Gasana Christian (Rwa) and Remy Singinzwa (Rwa)
Player of the match: Lucky Piety (Nga)

- Botswana won the toss and elected to bat.

3 June 2024
13:45
Scorecard

Rwanda; 95/5 (20 overs)	v	Kenya; 43 (15.3 overs)
Marie Bimenyimana 52 (64); Lavendah Idambo 2/13 (4 overs)		Venasa Ooko 18 (18); Alice Ikuzwe 5/12 (3.3 overs)

Rwanda won by 52 runs
Gahanga B Ground, Kigali
Umpires: Damascene Hagenimana (Rwa) and Tafadzwa Musakwa (Zim)
Player of the match: Alice Ikuzwe (Rwa)

- Kenya won the toss and elected to field.
- Alice Ikuzwe (Rwa) took her first five-wicket haul in T20Is.

==== Day six ====
4 June 2024
09:15
Scorecard

Nigeria; 104/5 (20 overs)	v	Rwanda; 72 (19 overs)
Salome Sunday 29 (12); Marie Bimenyimana 2/24 (4 overs)		Marie Bimenyimana 31 (54); Lillian Udeh 6/7 (4 overs)

Nigeria won by 32 runs
Gahanga International Cricket Stadium, Kigali
Umpires: Damascene Hagenimana (Rwa) and Tafadzwa Musakwa (Zim)
Player of the match: Lillian Udeh (Nga)

- Nigeria won the toss and elected to bat.
- Lillian Udeh (Nga) took her first five-wicket haul in T20Is.

4 June 2024
09:45
Scorecard

Kenya; 65/8 (20 overs)	v	Uganda; 70/2 (11.3 overs)
Queentor Abel 19 (24); Sarah Walaza 3/6 (3 overs)		Immaculate Nakisuuyi 41* (32); Lavendah Idambo 1/10 (3 overs)

Uganda won by 8 wickets
Gahanga B Ground, Kigali
Umpires: Veronique Iriho (Rwa) and Temitope Onikoyi (Nga)
Player of the match: Immaculate Nakisuuyi (Uga)

- Kenya won the toss and elected to bat.

4 June 2024
13:15
Scorecard

Zimbabwe A 139 (18.5 overs)	v	Botswana; 69 (18.2 overs)
Beloved Biza 31 (26); Shameelah Mosweu 3/16 (4 overs)		Goabilwe Matome 25 (24); Loryn Phiri 5/15 (3.2 overs)

Zimbabwe A won by 70 runs
Gahanga International Cricket Stadium, Kigali
Umpires: Tafadzwa Musakwa (Zim) and Gaston Niyibizi (Rwa)
Player of the match: Kelis Ndhlovu (Zim)

- Botswana won the toss and elected to field.

4 June 2024
13:45
Scorecard

Cameroon; 88 (18.4 overs)	v	Malawi; 92/2 (18.2 overs)
Jeanne Ngono 25 (28); Ketrina Chingaipe 3/16 (3.4 overs)		Sophina Chinawa 33* (57); Cynerah Mboe 1/9 (3 overs)

Malawi won by 8 wickets
Gahanga B Ground, Kigali
Umpires: Temitope Onikoyi (Nga) and Remy Singinzwa (Rwa)
Player of the match: Lidia Dimba (Mwi)

- Cameroon won the toss and elected to bat.

==== Day seven ====
5 June 2024
09:15
Scorecard

Cameroon; 37 (15.3 overs)	v	Kenya; 41/2 (6.5 overs)
Bernadette Mbida 14 (21); Esther Wachira 4/1 (4 overs)		Veronica Abuga 13 (12); Tchouabo Leslie 1/9 (2 overs)

Kenya won by 8 wickets
Gahanga International Cricket Stadium, Kigali
Umpires: Veronique Iriho (Rwa) and Remy Singinzwa (Rwa)
Player of the match: Esther Wachira (Ken)

- Cameroon won the toss and elected to bat.

5 June 2024
09:45
Scorecard

Botswana; 129/4 (20 overs)	v	Malawi; 36 (11 overs)
Laura Mophakedi 67 (60); Vanessa Phiri 1/14 (2 overs)		Mercy Kudimba 6 (9); Shameelah Mosweu 3/7 (2 overs)

Botswana won by 93 runs
Gahanga B Ground, Kigali
Umpires: Gasana Christian (Rwa) and Damascene Hagenimana (Rwa)
Player of the match: Tuelo Shadrack (Bot)

- Malawi won the toss and elected to field.

5 June 2024
13:15
Scorecard

Uganda; 100 (20 overs)	v	Rwanda; 88/8 (20 overs)
Immaculate Nakisuuyi 25 (31); Henriette Ishimwe 5/17 (4 overs)		Marie Bimenyimana 32 (42); Immaculate Nakisuuyi 3/30 (4 overs)

Uganda won by 12 runs
Gahanga International Cricket Stadium, Kigali
Umpires: Temitope Onikoyi (Nga) and Remy Singinzwa (Rwa)
Player of the match: Immaculate Nakisuuyi (Uga)

- Uganda won the toss and elected to bat.
- Henriette Ishimwe (Rwa) took her 100th wicket in T20Is.

5 June 2024
13:45
Scorecard

Zimbabwe A 158/7 (20 overs)	v	Nigeria; 94 (18.2 overs)
Kelis Ndhlovu 51 (41); Peculiar Agboya 3/25 (4 overs)		Favour Eseigbe 21* (22); Christine Mutasa 5/11 (4 overs)

Zimbabwe A won by 64 runs
Gahanga B Ground, Kigali
Umpires: Damascene Hagenimana (Rwa) and Gaston Niyibizi (Rwa)
Player of the match: Christine Mutasa (Zim)

- Zimbabwe A won the toss and elected to bat.
- Christine Mutasa (Zim) took a hat-trick.

==== Day eight ====
7 June 2024
09:15
Scorecard

Zimbabwe A 127/3 (20 overs)	v	Rwanda; 130/4 (19.1 overs)
Loryn Phiri 58* (39); Rosine Irera 2/22 (4 overs)		Henriette Ishimwe 46* (29); Loryn Phiri 2/21 (4 overs)

Rwanda won by 6 wickets
Gahanga International Cricket Stadium, Kigali
Umpires: Gasana Christian (Rwa) and Temitope Onikoyi (Nga)
Player of the match: Rosine Irera (Rwa)

- Zimbabwe A won the toss and elected to bat.

7 June 2024
09:45
Scorecard

Nigeria; 180/6 (20 overs)	v	Malawi; 90/6 (20 overs)
Lucky Piety 70 (48); Ketrina Chingaipe 2/38 (4 overs)		Sugeni Kananji 29* (48); Christabel Chukwuonye 2/10 (2 overs)

Nigeria won by 90 runs
Gahanga B Ground, Kigali
Umpires: Tafadzwa Musakwa (Zim) and Gaston Niyibizi (Rwa)
Player of the match: Lucky Piety (Nga)

- Malawi win the toss and elected to field.

7 June 2024
13:15
Scorecard

Uganda; 158/4 (20 overs)	v	Cameroon; 63/9 (20 overs)
Prosscovia Alako 100 (63); Tchouabo Leslie 2/35 (4 overs)		Marguerite Bessala 15 (26); Patricia Timong 4/18 (4 overs)

Uganda won by 95 runs
Gahanga International Cricket Stadium, Kigali
Umpires: Tafadzwa Musakwa (Zim) and Gaston Niyibizi (Rwa)
Player of the match: Prosscovia Alako (Uga)

- Uganda won the toss and elected to bat.
- Cathy Mbelel (Cmr) made her T20I debut.

7 June 2024
13:45
Scorecard

Kenya; 151/6 (20 overs)	v	Botswana; 107/4 (20 overs)
Charity Muthoni 64 (58); Tuelo Shadrack 3/17 (4 overs)		Shameelah Mosweu 43 (36); Judith Ajiambo 2/20 (4 overs)

Kenya won by 44 runs
Gahanga B Ground, Kigali
Umpires: Veronique Iriho (Rwa) and Remy Singinzwa (Rwa)
Player of the match: Charity Muthoni (Ken)

- Kenya won the toss and elected to bat.

== Play-offs ==
=== 7th place play-off ===
8 June 2022
09:15
Scorecard

Cameroon; 90/8 (20 overs)	v	Malawi; 93/1 (15.1 overs)
Jeanne Ngono 23 (29); Lucy Malino 3/20 (4 overs)		Triphonia Luka 41* (45); Tchouabo Leslie 1/15 (4 overs)

Malawi won by 9 wickets
Gahanga B Ground, Kigali
Umpires: Remy Singinzwa (Rwa) and Temitope Onikoyi (Nga)
Player of the match: Sugeni Kananji (Mwi)

- Cameroon won the toss and elected to bat.

=== 5th place play-off ===
8 June 2022
09:45
Scorecard

Kenya; 171/6 (20 overs)	v	Botswana; 89/5 (20 overs)
Queentor Abel 43 (31); Onneile Keitsemang 2/26 (2.3 overs)		Laura Mophakedi 46 (54); Judith Ajiambo 2/23 (4 overs)

Kenya won by 82 runs
Gahanga International Cricket Stadium, Kigali
Umpires: Damascene Hagenimana (Rwa) and Veronique Iriho (Rwa)
Player of the match: Queentor Abel (Ken)

- Botswana won the toss and elected to field.

=== 3rd place play-off ===
8 June 2022
13:15
Scorecard

Nigeria; 80/9 (20 overs)	v	Rwanda; 81/4 (16.3 overs)
Sarah Etim 21* (22); Alice Ikuzwe 4/13 (4 overs)		Henriette Ishimwe 26* (21); Christabel Chukwuonye 3/7 (4 overs)

Rwanda won by 6 wickets
Gahanga B Ground, Kigali
Umpires: Gasana Christian (Rwa) and Remy Singinzwa (Rwa)
Player of the match: Henriette Ishimwe (Rwa)

- Nigeria won the toss and elected to bat.

=== Final ===
8 June 2022
13:45
Scorecard

Uganda; 80/8 (20 overs)	v	Zimbabwe A 78 (20 overs)
Prosscovia Alako 24 (26); Christine Mutasa 2/7 (3 overs)		Loryn Phiri 27 (43); Janet Mbabazi 5/10 (4 overs)

Uganda won by 2 runs
Gahanga International Cricket Stadium, Kigali
Umpires: Veronique Iriho (Rwa) and Gaston Niyibizi (Rwa)
Player of the match: Janet Mbabazi (Uga)

- Uganda won the toss and elected to bat.
