= 2023 Kwibuka Women's T20 Tournament =

International cricket tournament

- Dates: 10 – 17 June 2023
- Administrator: Rwanda Cricket Association
- Cricket format: Twenty20 International
- Tournament format(s): Double round-robin and play-offs
- Host: Rwanda
- Champions: Rwanda (1st title)
- Runners-up: Uganda
- Participants: 5
- Matches: 22
- Player of the series: (Kenya) Queentor Abel
- Most runs: (Kenya) Queentor Abel (206)
- Most wickets: (Rwanda) Henriette Ishimwe (16)

The 2023 Kwibuka Women's T20 Tournament was a Twenty20 International (T20I) cricket tournament that took place in Rwanda from 10 to 17 June 2023. It was the ninth edition of the annual Kwibuka T20 Tournament, which was first played in 2014 in remembrance of the victims of the 1994 genocide against the Tutsi.

Tanzania had won the 2022 tournament, but they did not enter the 2023 tournament, which featured Rwanda, Botswana, Kenya, Nigeria and Uganda.

Nigeria made a good start, winning their first three games to take a surprise lead in the tournament standings. The closely contested round-robin stage ultimately saw the hosts and Nigeria in a race to claim the second spot in the final behind Uganda. Uganda topped the table, winning their first seven round-robin games, before losing a dead-rubber against Nigeria.

Rwanda claimed a surprise 6-wicket victory over Uganda in the final. This was Rwanda's first win against Uganda and the first time that they had won the Kwibuka tournament.

== Squads ==
Botswana	Kenya	Nigeria	Rwanda	Uganda
Laura Mophakedi (c, wk); Mercy Dipogiso (wk); Onneile Keitsemang; Oratile Kgeresi; Pako Mapotsane; Goabilwe Matome; Thapelo Modise; Amantle Mokgotlhe; Shameelah Mosweu; Tebogo Motlhabaphuti; Merapelo Phiase; Florence Samanyika; Goitseone Setshwane; Tuelo Shadrack	Esther Wachira (c); Melvin Khagoitsa (vc); Queentor Abel; Judith Ajiambo; Lavendah Idambo; Marion Juma; Charity Muthoni (wk); Mary Mwangi; Lynz Nabwire; Monicah Ndhambi; Flavia Odhiambo; Kelvia Ogola; Venasa Ooko; Ann Wanjira	Blessing Etim (c); Favour Eseigbe (vc); Rukayat Abdulrasak; Adeshola Adekunle; Peculiar Agboya; Omonye Asika; Sarah Etim (wk); Abigail Igbobie (wk); Agatha Obulor; Oseyende Omonkhobio; Lucky Piety; Rachael Samson; Esther Sandy; Salome Sunday	Marie Bimenyimana (c); Sifa Ingabire; Alice Ikuzwe; Rosine Irera; Gisele Ishimwe; Henriette Ishimwe; Immaculee Muhawenimana; Belise Murekatete; Josiane Nyirankundineza; Clarisse Uwase; Geovanis Uwase (wk); Merveille Uwase (wk); Sarah Uwera (wk); Margueritte Vumiliya	Concy Aweko (c); Prosscovia Alako; Irene Alumo; Lorna Anyait; Evelyn Anyipo; Malisa Ariokot; Kevin Awino (wk); Mohammed Jimia; Phiona Kulume; Patricia Malemikia; Janet Mbabazi; Rita Musamali; Immaculate Nakisuuyi; Stephani Nampiina

== Round-robin ==
=== Points table ===
Pos	Team	Pld	W	L	NR	Pts	NRR
1	Uganda	8	7	1	0	14	1.197
2	Rwanda	8	5	3	0	10	0.442
3	Nigeria	8	5	3	0	10	−0.019
4	Kenya	8	2	6	0	4	−0.794
5	Botswana	8	1	7	0	2	−0.817

Source: ESPNcricinfo

Advanced to the final
Advanced to the 3rd place play-off

=== Fixtures ===
==== Day one ====
10 June 2023
09:45
Scorecard

Rwanda; 66 (20 overs)	v	Botswana; 46 (19.5 overs)
Marie Bimenyimana 19 (39); Shameelah Mosweu 2/11 (4 overs)		Florence Samanyika 17 (41); Rosine Irera 3/8 (4 overs)

Rwanda won by 20 runs
Gahanga International Cricket Stadium, Kigali
Umpires: Scarlett Hale (Eng) and Veronique Iriho (Rwa)
Player of the match: Belise Murekatete (Rwa)

- Rwanda won the toss and elected to bat.
- Pako Mapotsane (Bot) made her T20I debut.

10 June 2023
13:45
Scorecard

Uganda; 88/6 (20 overs)	v	Botswana; 60/9 (20 overs)
Rita Musamali 34* (39); Florence Samanyika 4/16 (4 overs)		Thapelo Modise 18 (37); Irene Alumo 3/9 (4 overs)

Uganda won by 28 runs
IPRC Cricket Ground, Kigali
Umpires: Sharon Athuola (Uga) and Temitope Onikoyi (Nga)
Player of the match: Rita Musamali (Uga)

- Uganda won the toss and elected to bat.
- Merapelo Phiase (Bot) and Malisa Ariokot (Uga) both made their T20I debuts.

10 June 2023
13:45
Scorecard

Rwanda; 87/7 (20 overs)	v	Nigeria; 88/4 (18.2 overs)
Gisele Ishimwe 30 (39); Adeshola Adekunle 2/13 (3 overs)		Salome Sunday 47* (57); Immaculee Muhawenimana 2/20 (4 overs)

Nigeria won by 6 wickets
Gahanga International Cricket Stadium, Kigali
Umpires: Scarlett Hale (Eng) and John Mayeku (Uga)
Player of the match: Salome Sunday (Nga)

- Rwanda won the toss and elected to bat.

==== Day two ====
11 June 2023
09:15
Scorecard

Kenya; 91/7 (20 overs)	v	Rwanda; 95/2 (15.5 overs)
Venasa Ooko 30 (23); Josiane Nyirankundineza 2/12 (4 overs)		Henriette Ishimwe 49* (36); Lavendah Idambo 1/7 (3 overs)

Rwanda won by 8 wickets
IPRC Cricket Ground, Kigali
Umpires: Sharon Athuola (Uga) and Temitope Onikoyi (Nga)
Player of the match: Henriette Ishimwe (Rwa)

- Kenya won the toss and elected to bat.

11 June 2023
09:45
Scorecard

Botswana; 97/6 (20 overs)	v	Nigeria; 98/4 (16.2 overs)
Shameelah Mosweu 26 (52); Favour Eseigbe 2/14 (3 overs)		Blessing Etim 26 (22); Goabilwe Matome 2/13 (3.2 overs)

Nigeria won by 6 wickets
Gahanga International Cricket Stadium, Kigali
Umpires: Veronique Iriho (Rwa) and John Mayeku (Uga)
Player of the match: Lucky Piety (Nga)

- Nigeria won the toss and elected to field.

11 June 2023
13:15
Scorecard

Rwanda; 80/8 (20 overs)	v	Uganda; 84/3 (18.1 overs)
Gisele Ishimwe 33 (41); Evelyn Anyipo 4/1 (4 overs)		Kevin Awino 34 (49); Margueritte Vumiliya 2/16 (4 overs)

Uganda won by 7 wickets
IPRC Cricket Ground, Kigali
Umpires: Scarlett Hale (Eng) and Temitope Onikoyi (Nga)
Player of the match: Evelyn Anyipo (Uga)

- Uganda won the toss and elected to field.
- Lorna Anyait (Uga) made her T20I debut.

11 June 2023
13:45
Scorecard

Kenya; 95/4 (20 overs)	v	Nigeria; 98/7 (16.4 overs)
Queentor Abel 51 (55); Favour Eseigbe 2/16 (4 overs)		Lucky Piety 32* (27); Queentor Abel 3/11 (4 overs)

Nigeria won by 3 wickets
Gahanga International Cricket Stadium, Kigali
Umpires: Veronique Iriho (Rwa) and Gaston Niyibizi (Rwa)
Player of the match: Lucky Piety (Nga)

- Kenya won the toss and elected to bat.

==== Day three ====
12 June 2023
09:45
Scorecard

Nigeria; 100/5 (20 overs)	v	Uganda; 101/5 (18.2 overs)
Esther Sandy 52 (39); Evelyn Anyipo 2/14 (4 overs)		Immaculate Nakisuuyi 31 (20); Favour Eseigbe 2/19 (4 overs)

Uganda won by 5 wickets
Gahanga International Cricket Stadium, Kigali
Umpires: Sharon Athuola (Uga) and Gaston Niyibizi (Rwa)
Player of the match: Stephani Nampiina (Uga)

- Uganda won the toss and elected to field.

12 June 2023
13:45
Scorecard

Botswana; 51 (17.1 overs)	v	Kenya; 57/2 (10.5 overs)
Laura Mophakedi 11 (36); Esther Wachira 3/3 (2.1 overs)		Queentor Abel 40* (32); Shameelah Mosweu 2/17 (2.5 overs)

Kenya won by 8 wickets
Gahanga International Cricket Stadium, Kigali
Umpires: Scarlett Hale (Eng) and John Mayeku (Uga)
Player of the match: Melvin Khagoitsa (Ken)

- Kenya won the toss and elected to field.

==== Day four ====
13 June 2023
09:45
Scorecard

Uganda; 85 (19 overs)	v	Kenya; 72 (18.2 overs)
Stephani Nampiina 37 (36); Flavia Odhiambo 4/16 (4 overs)		Queentor Abel 18 (26); Janet Mbabazi 2/8 (2.2 overs)

Uganda won by 13 runs
Gahanga International Cricket Stadium, Kigali
Umpires: Gaston Niyibizi (Rwa) and Temitope Onikoyi (Nga)
Player of the match: Stephani Nampiina (Uga)

- Kenya won the toss and elected to field.

==== Day five ====
14 June 2023
09:15
Scorecard

Botswana; 81/8 (20 overs)	v	Uganda; 83/4 (13.4 overs)
Florence Samanyika 31 (42); Malisa Ariokot 3/14 (3 overs)		Mohammed Jimia 21 (21); Florence Samanyika 2/17 (4 overs)

Uganda won by 6 wickets
IPRC Cricket Ground, Kigali
Umpires: Lydiah Kaparo (Ken) and Temitope Onikoyi (Nga)
Player of the match: Malisa Ariokot (Uga)

- Uganda won the toss and elected to field.

14 June 2023
09:45
Scorecard

Nigeria; 74/9 (20 overs)	v	Kenya; 52/5 (20 overs)
Esther Sandy 20 (29); Esther Wachira 2/6 (4 overs)		Venasa Ooko 21* (46); Oseyende Omonkhobio 1/5 (4 overs)

Nigeria won by 22 runs
Gahanga International Cricket Stadium, Kigali
Umpires: Sharon Athuola (Uga) and Gaston Niyibizi (Rwa)
Player of the match: Peculiar Agboya (Nga)

- Kenya won the toss and elected to field.

14 June 2023
13:15
Scorecard

Uganda; 116/6 (20 overs)	v	Kenya; 79/5 (20 overs)
Stephani Nampiina 31 (20); Queentor Abel 1/11 (4 overs)		Venasa Ooko 17 (32); Evelyn Anyipo 1/6 (4 overs)

Uganda won by 37 runs
IPRC Cricket Ground, Kigali
Umpires: Veronique Iriho (Rwa) and Temitope Onikoyi (Nga)
Player of the match: Stephani Nampiina (Uga)

- Uganda won the toss and elected to bat.

14 June 2023
13:45
Scorecard

Nigeria; 42 (15.2 overs)	v	Rwanda; 43/1 (9.5 overs)
Lucky Piety 18 (20); Henriette Ishimwe 4/10 (3 overs)		Gisele Ishimwe 24* (31); Lucky Piety 1/8 (1.5 overs)

Rwanda won by 9 wickets
Gahanga International Cricket Stadium, Kigali
Umpires: Sharon Athuola (Uga) and Scarlett Hale (Eng)
Player of the match: Alice Ikuzwe (Rwa)

- Nigeria won the toss and elected to bat.

==== Day six ====
15 June 2023
09:15
Scorecard

Rwanda; 31 (13 overs)	v	Uganda; 32/0 (6.2 overs)
Alice Ikuzwe 10 (14); Concy Aweko 3/2 (3 overs)		Janet Mbabazi 20* (18)

Uganda won by 10 wickets
IPRC Cricket Ground, Kigali
Umpires: Scarlett Hale (Eng) and Lydiah Kaparo (Ken)
Player of the match: Concy Aweko (Uga)

- Uganda won the toss and elected to field.

15 June 2023
09:45
Scorecard

Kenya; 82/8 (20 overs)	v	Botswana; 82/7 (13 overs)
Mary Mwangi 12 (13); Goabilwe Matome 3/12 (4 overs)		Florence Samanyika 24 (31); Flavia Odhiambo 2/9 (2 overs)

Match tied (Kenya won the Super Over)
Gahanga International Cricket Stadium, Kigali
Umpires: Veronique Iriho (Rwa) and Temitope Onikoyi (Nga)
Player of the match: Flavia Odhiambo (Ken)

- Kenya won the toss and elected to bat.
- Super Over: Botswana 9/0, Kenya 10/0

15 June 2023
13:15
Scorecard

Kenya; 54 (18.2 overs)	v	Rwanda; 55/3 (8.3 overs)
Venasa Ooko 17 (20); Henriette Ishimwe 4/11 (4 overs)		Alice Ikuzwe 20 (13); Queentor Abel 2/23 (3.3 overs)

Rwanda won by 7 wickets
IPRC Cricket Ground, Kigali
Umpires: Sharon Athuola (Uga) and Scarlett Hale (Eng)
Player of the match: Henriette Ishimwe (Rwa)

- Rwanda won the toss and elected to field.
- Judith Ajiambo (Ken) made her T20I debut.

15 June 2023
13:45
Scorecard

Botswana; 114/4 (20 overs)	v	Nigeria; 91/8 (20 overs)
Goabilwe Matome 45* (57); Oseyende Omonkhobio 1/16 (4 overs); Lucky Piety 1/16 (4 overs)		Abigail Igbobie 24 (37); Shameelah Mosweu 4/9 (4 overs)

Botswana won by 23 runs
Gahanga International Cricket Stadium, Kigali
Umpires: Gaston Niyibizi (Rwa) and Veronique Iriho (Rwa)
Player of the match: Shameelah Mosweu (Bot)

- Nigeria won the toss and elected to field.

==== Day seven ====
16 June 2023
09:45
Scorecard

Botswana; 68/7 ( overs)	v	Rwanda; 72/7 (18.5 overs)
Florence Samanyika 30* (48); Alice Ikuzwe 3/15 (4 overs)		Merveille Uwase 34* (49); Tuelo Shadrack 2/8 (3.5 overs)

Rwanda won by 3 wickets
Gahanga International Cricket Stadium, Kigali
Umpires: Sharon Athuola (Uga) and Lydiah Kaparo (Ken)
Player of the match: Alice Ikuzwe (Rwa)

- Botswana won the toss and elected to bat.

16 June 2023
13:45
Scorecard

Uganda; 72/9 (20 overs)	v	Nigeria; 76/7 (18.5 overs)
Stephani Nampiina 21 (29); Adeshola Adekunle 3/14 (4 overs)		Salome Sunday 25* (37); Stephani Nampiina 2/18 (4 overs)

Nigeria won by 3 wickets
Gahanga International Cricket Stadium, Kigali
Umpires: Lydiah Kaparo (Ken) and Gaston Niyibizi (Rwa)
Player of the match: Rachael Samson (Nga)

- Uganda won the toss and elected to bat.

== 3rd place play-off ==
17 June 2022
09:45
Scorecard

Kenya; 99/3 (20 overs)	v	Nigeria; 51 (18 overs)
Queentor Abel 60* (55); Rukayat Abdulrasak 1/11 (4 overs)		Lucky Piety 17 (19); Mary Mwangi 4/9 (4 overs)

Kenya won by 48 runs
Gahanga International Cricket Stadium, Kigali
Umpires: Sharon Athuola (Uga) and Veronique Iriho (Rwa)
Player of the match: Queentor Abel (Ken)

- Nigeria won the toss and elected to field.

== Final ==
17 June 2022
13:45
Scorecard

Uganda; 65 (20 overs)	v	Rwanda; 66/4 (16.1 overs)
Stephani Nampiina 19 (33); Henriette Ishimwe 4/6 (4 overs)		Merveille Uwase 17 (41); Phiona Kulume 2/11 (4 overs)

Rwanda won by 6 wickets
Gahanga International Cricket Stadium, Kigali
Umpires: Scarlett Hale (Eng) and Temitope Onikoyi (Nga)
Player of the match: Henriette Ishimwe (Rwa)

- Rwanda won the toss and elected to field.
