= 2019 Victoria Tri-Series =

- Date: 6–10 April 2019
- Location: Uganda
- Result: Zimbabwe won the series
Teams
Uganda	Kenya	Zimbabwe
Captains
Kevin Awino	Margaret Ngoche	Mary-Anne Musonda
Most runs
Immaculate Nakisuuyi (74)	Venasa Ooko (58)	Modester Mupachikwa (105)
Most wickets
Immaculate Nakisuuyi (6)	Queentor Abel (5)	Tasmeen Granger (10)

The 2019 Victoria Tri-Series was a Women's Twenty20 International (WT20I) cricket tournament held in Uganda in April 2019. The participating teams were the women's national sides of Uganda, Kenya and Zimbabwe. These were the first matches played by Kenya Women to have WT20I status after the International Cricket Council announced that all matches played between women's teams of Associate Members after 1 July 2018 would have full T20I status. The tournament provided all three teams with some preparation for the 2019 ICC Women's Qualifier Africa. Zimbabwe defeated Uganda in the final by 25 runs.

== Points table ==
Pos	Team	Pld	W	L	T	NR	Pts	NRR
1	Zimbabwe	4	3	0	0	1	7	0.914
2	Uganda (H)	4	2	2	0	0	4	−0.003
3	Kenya	4	0	3	0	1	1	−0.901

(H) Host
- advanced to the final

== Matches ==
6 April 2019
Scorecard

Zimbabwe; 102/8 (20 overs)	v	Kenya; 96/9 (20 overs)
Modester Mupachikwa 21 (35); Daisy Njoroge 2/7 (2 overs)		Margaret Ngoche 27 (40); Tasmeen Granger 3/18 (4 overs)

Zimbabwe won by 6 runs
Lugogo Cricket Oval, Kampala
Umpires: Baker Elonge (Uga) and Simon Kintu (Uga)
Player of the match: Tasmeen Granger (Zim)

- Kenya won the toss and elected to field.
- Queentor Abel, Sharon Juma, Sylvia Kinyua, Mary Mwangi, Teresia Mwangi, Monicah Ndhambi, Margaret Ngoche, Daisy Njoroge, Mercyline Ochieng, Venasa Ooko, Esther Wachira (Ken) and Tasmeen Granger (Zim) all made their WT20I debuts.

6 April 2019
Scorecard

Uganda; 110 (18.5 overs)	v	Kenya; 76 (15.5 overs)
Concy Aweko 22* (13); Queentor Abel 5/18 (2.5 overs)		Margaret Ngoche 24 (25); Immaculate Nakisuuyi 3/18 (2.5 overs)

Uganda won by 34 runs
Lugogo Cricket Oval, Kampala
Umpires: Baker Elonge (Uga) and Simon Kintu (Uga)
Player of the match: Queentor Abel (Ken)

- Kenya won the toss and elected to field.
- Naome Bagenda and Damalie Busingye (Uga) both made their WT20I debuts.

7 April 2019
Scorecard

Kenya; 100/7 (20 overs)	v	Uganda; 105/3 (18.2 overs)
Venasa Ooko 30*; Janet Mbabazi 3/24 (3 overs)		Rita Musamali 35 (42); Lavendah Idambo 1/18 (4 overs)

Uganda won by 7 wickets
Kyambogo Cricket Oval, Kampala
Umpires: James Bamulese (Uga) and Paul Okecho (Uga)
Player of the match: Immaculate Nakisuuyi (Uga)

- Uganda won the toss and elected to field.
- Lavendah Idambo (Ken) made her WT20I debut.

7 April 2019
Scorecard

Zimbabwe; 115/6 (20 overs)	v	Uganda; 91/8 (20 overs)
Ashley Ndiraya 26* (27); Damalie Busingye 3/19 (4 overs)		Naomi Kayondo 26 (44); Nomvelo Sibanda 3/14 (4 overs)

Zimbabwe won by 24 runs
Kyambogo Cricket Oval, Kampala
Umpires: James Bamulese (Uga) and Paul Okecho (Uga)
Player of the match: Precious Marange (Zim)

- Uganda won the toss and elected to field.
- Evelyn Anyipo (Uga) made her WT20I debut.

9 April 2019
Scorecard

Kenya	v	Zimbabwe

Match abandoned
Lugogo Cricket Oval, Kampala
Umpires: Patric Makumbi (Uga) and John Mayeku (Uga)

- No toss.
- No play possible due to rain.

9 April 2019
Scorecard

Uganda; 65 (16.5 overs)	v	Zimbabwe; 66/1 (15.2 overs)
Naomi Kayondo 13 (28); Precious Marange 2/7 (3 overs)		Modester Mupachikwa 36 (45); Sarah Walaza 1/7 (1 over)

Zimbabwe won by 9 wickets
Lugogo Cricket Oval, Kampala
Umpires: Patric Makumbi (Uga) and John Mayeku (Uga)
Player of the match: Anesu Mushangwe (Zim)

- Zimbabwe won the toss and elected to field.
- Sarah Walaza (Uga) made her WT20I debut.

== Final ==
10 April 2019
Scorecard

Zimbabwe; 118/5 (20 overs)	v	Uganda; 93/8 (20 overs)
Chipo Mugeri-Tiripano 29 (26); Concy Aweko 1/18 (4 overs)		Immaculate Nakisuuyi 26* (25); Anesu Mushangwe 3/12 (4 overs)

Zimbabwe won by 25 runs
Lugogo Cricket Oval, Kampala
Umpires: Patric Makumbi (Uga) and John Mayeku (Uga)
Player of the match: Anesu Mushangwe (Zim)

- Uganda won the toss and elected to field.
