= Carol Namugenyi =

Ugandan cricketer (born 1990)

Personal information
- Full name: Carol Namugenyi
- Born: 27 September 1990 (age 36)
- Batting: Right-handed
- Bowling: Right-arm medium-fast

International information
- National side: Uganda
- T20I debut (cap 10): 7 July 2018 v Scotland
- Last T20I: 14 July 2018 v Thailand

Career statistics
Competition	WT20I
Matches	5
Runs scored	2
Batting average	2.00
100s/50s	0/0
Top score	2*
Balls bowled	84
Wickets	1
Bowling average	57.00
5 wickets in innings	0
10 wickets in match	0
Best bowling	1/1
Catches/stumpings	0/–
- Source: Cricinfo, 6 October 2021

Carol Namugenyi (born 27 September 1990) is a Ugandan cricketer. In July 2018, she was named in Uganda's squad for the 2018 ICC Women's World Twenty20 Qualifier tournament. She made her Women's Twenty20 International (WT20I) debut for Uganda against Scotland in the World Twenty20 Qualifier on 7 July 2018.

== See also ==
- Joyce Apio
- Concy Aweko
- Kevin Awino
- Peter de Souza
