= Prico Nakitende =

Ugandan cricketer (born 1994)

Personal information
- Full name: Prico Nakitende
- Born: 7 August 1994 (age 32)
- Batting: Right-handed

International information
- National side: Uganda
- Only T20I (cap 14): 10 July 2018 v Ireland
- Source: ESPNCricinfo, 14 December 2023

Prico Nakitende (born 7 August 1994) is a Ugandan women's cricketer. In July 2018, she was named in Uganda's squad for the 2018 ICC Women's World Twenty20 Qualifier tournament. She made her Women's Twenty20 International (WT20I) debut for Uganda against Ireland in the World Twenty20 Qualifier on 10 July 2018, opening the batting.

== See also ==
- Joyce Apio
- Concy Aweko
- Kevin Awino
- Charlie de Souza
- Peter de Souza
