= List of Papua New Guinea national cricket captains =

This is a list of all the cricketers who have captained the Papua New Guinea men's team, Papua New Guinea under-19 team and Papua New Guinea women's team in an official international match. This includes the ICC tournaments, Under-19 One Day Internationals, One Day Internationals and Twenty20 Internationals. This list is correct as of 30 January 2026.

== Men's cricket ==
=== One Day Internationals ===
This is a list of cricketers who have captained the Papua New Guinea men's cricket team for at least one One Day International. The table of results is complete to the ODI against Canada in April 2023.

Papua New Guinean ODI captains
No.	Name	Year	Played	Won	Lost	Tied	N/R
1	Chris Amini	2014–2014	2	2	0	0	0
2	Assad Vala	2016–2023	64	12	51	1	0
Overall			66	14	51	1	0

=== Twenty20 Internationals ===
This is a list of cricketers who have captained the Papua New Guinea men's cricket team for at least one Twenty20 International. The table of results is complete to the T20I against Oman in October 2025.

Papua New Guinean T20I captains
Number	Name	Year	Played	Won	Lost	Tied	No Result
1	Jack Vare	2015–2016	5	2	3	0	0
2	Assad Vala	2014–present	61	33	27	0	1
3	Tony Ura	2024	1	1	0	0	0
4	Norman Vanua	2024	1	0	1	0	0
Overall			68	36	31	0	1

=== Captains in ICC tournaments ===
T20 World Cup

This is a list of cricketers who have captained the Papua New Guinea men's cricket team at the Men's T20 World Cup. The table of results is complete to the 2024 edition.

Papua New Guinean captains at the Men's T20WC
Tournament	Name	Played	Won	Tied	Lost	No Result	Position
2021	Assad Vala	3	0	0	3	0	First round
2024	Assad Vala	4	0	0	4	0	Group stage
Overall		7	0	0	7	0	—N/a

ICC Trophy/Cricket World Cup Qualifier

This is a list of cricketers who have captained the Papua New Guinea men's cricket team at the Cricket World Cup Qualifier. The table of results is complete to the 2018 edition.

Papua New Guinean captains at the CWC Qualifier
Tournament	Name	Played	Won	Tied	Lost	No Result	Position
1979	Nigel Agonia	4	1	0	1	2	Group stage
1982	Api Leka	9	4	0	4	1	Semi-finals
1986	Api Leka	8	4	0	4	0	Group stage
1990	William Maha	7	4	0	3	0	Second round
1994	Api Leka	5	3	0	2	0	Plate round
1994	Vavine Pala	2	2	0	0	0	Plate round
1997	Vavine Pala	5	3	0	2	0	13th place
1997	Charles Amini	1	0	0	1	0	13th place
2001	Navu Maha	5	1	0	4	0	Group stage
2005	Rarva Dikana	7	2	0	5	0	11th place
2014	Chris Amini	7	3	0	4	0	4th place
2018	Assad Vala	6	1	0	5	0	9th place
Overall		65	29	0	34	2	—N/a

T20 World Cup Qualifier/EAP regional final

Tournament	Name	Played	Won	Tied	Lost	No Result	Position
Papua New Guinea captains in the Men's T20 World Cup Qualifier
2012	Rarva Dikana	9	4	0	5	0	8th place
2013	Chris Amini	9	4	0	5	0	8th place
2015	Jack Vare	6	3	0	3	0	8th place
2019	Assad Vala	8	6	0	2	0	Runners-up
2022	Assad Vala	5	2	0	3	0	3rd place
Papua New Guinea captains in the EAP regional final
2023	Assad Vala	6	6	0	0	0	Winners
2025	Assad Vala	2	0	0	2	0	Group stage
Overall		45	25	0	20	0	—N/a

== Women's cricket ==
=== Women's One Day Internationals ===
This is a list of cricketers who have captained the Papua New Guinea women's cricket team for at least one Women's One Day International. The table of results is complete to the ODI against United Arab Emirates in October 2025.

Papua New Guinean women's ODI captains
Number	Name	Year	Played	Won	Tied	Lost	No Result
1	Brenda Tau	2024–2025	13	3	0	10	0
Overall			13	3	0	10	0

=== Women's Twenty20 Internationals ===
This is a list of cricketers who have captained the Papua New Guinea women's cricket team for at least one Women's Twenty20 International. The table of results is complete to the T20I against United States in January 2026.

Papua New Guinean women's T20I captains
Number	Name	Year	Played	Won	Tied	Lost	No Result
1	Pauke Siaka	2018	3	2	0	1	0
2	Kaia Arua	2018–2023	39	29	0	9	1
3	Ravina Oa	2019	2	1	0	1	0
4	Brenda Tau	2024–present	32	18	1	12	1
Overall			76	50	1	23	2

=== Captains in ICC tournaments ===
T20 World Cup Qualifier

This is a list of cricketers who have captained the Papua New Guinea women's cricket team at the Women's T20 World Cup Qualifier. The table of results is complete to the 2026 edition.

Papua New Guinean women's captains at Women's T20WC Qualifier
Tournament	Name	Played	Won	Tied	Lost	No Result	Position
2015	Norma Ovasuru	5	3	0	2	0	5th place
2018	Pauke Siaka	5	2	0	3	0	Semi-finals
2019	Ravina Oa	2	1	0	1	0	Semi-finals
2019	Kaia Arua	8	4	0	4	0	Semi-finals
2022	Kaia Arua	8	4	0	4	0	5th place
2026	Brenda Tau	4	1	0	3	0	Group stage
Overall		24	11	0	13	0	—N/a
