= Franklin Najjumba =

Ugandan cricketer (born 1987)

Personal information
- Full name: Franklin Najjumba
- Born: 3 December 1987 (age 38)
- Batting: Right-handed
- Bowling: Right-arm medium-fast

International information
- National side: Uganda
- T20I debut (cap 8): 7 July 2018 v Scotland
- Last T20I: 19 May 2022 v Nepal
- Source: Cricinfo, 19 May 2022

Franklin Najjumba (born 3 December 1987) is a Uganda women's cricketer. In July 2018, she was named in Uganda's squad for the 2018 ICC Women's World Twenty20 Qualifier tournament. She made her Women's Twenty20 International (WT20I) debut for Uganda against Scotland in the World Twenty20 Qualifier on 7 July 2018.

In April 2019, she was named in Uganda's squad for the 2019 ICC Women's Qualifier Africa tournament in Zimbabwe. Najjumba is a right-handed batter and right-arm medium-fast bowler.

== See also ==
- Joyce Apio
- Concy Aweko
- Kevin Awino
- Kenneth Kamyuka
