= Racheal Ntono =

Ugandan cricketer (born 1997)

Personal information
- Full name: Racheal Ntono
- Born: 7 July 1997 (age 29); Iganga, Uganda
- Batting: Right-handed

International information
- National side: Uganda
- T20I debut (cap 11): 7 July 2018 v Scotland
- Last T20I: 17 September 2021 v Zimbabwe
- Source: Cricinfo, 17 September 2021

Racheal Ntono (born 7 July 1997) is a Ugandan cricketer. Ntono started playing cricket in 2011, when she was still in school.

In July 2018, she was named in Uganda's squad for the 2018 ICC Women's World Twenty20 Qualifier tournament. She made her Women's Twenty20 International (WT20I) debut for Uganda against Scotland in the World Twenty20 Qualifier on 7 July 2018. In April 2019, she was named in Uganda's squad for the 2019 ICC Women's Qualifier Africa tournament in Zimbabwe.

== See also ==
- Hamza Almuzahim
- Davis Arinaitwe
- Joyce Apio
- Concy Aweko
