= 2019 Kwibuka Women's T20 Tournament =

International cricket tournament

- Dates: 18 – 23 June 2019
- Administrator: Rwanda Cricket Association
- Cricket format: Women's Twenty20 International
- Tournament format: Double round-robin
- Host: Rwanda
- Champions: Tanzania (1st title)
- Runners-up: Uganda
- Participants: 4
- Matches: 12
- Player of the series: (Rwanda) Marie Bimenyimana
- Most runs: (Uganda) Rita Musamali (189)
- Most wickets: (Uganda) Joyce Apio (10)

The 2019 Kwibuka Women's T20 Tournament was a women's T20I cricket (WT20I) tournament held in Rwanda from 18 to 23 June 2019. This was the sixth edition of the annual Kwibuka T20 Tournament, first organised in 2014 in remembrance of the victims of the 1994 Genocide against the Tutsi.

The participants were the women's national sides of Rwanda, Uganda, Mali and Tanzania, with the latter two teams making their first appearance in the tournament while defending champions Kenya withdrew due to a lack of funding. This was the first time in the tournament's history that the matches were recognised as official Women's Twenty20 International (WT20I) games as per ICC's announcement to grant full WT20I status to all the matches played between the associate teams after 1 July 2018. All the matches were played at the Gahanga International Cricket Stadium in Kigali. Kenya had previously won the title three times (2015, 2017, 2018) while Uganda had won it twice, the inaugural edition in 2014 and also in 2016. Tanzania Women won this year's edition by winning all of their matches and thus remaining unbeaten, while two Ugandan players, Rita Musamali and Joyce Apio became the highest run scorer and wicket taker respectively.

In the 2nd match of the tournament, the Mali women's team was bowled out for six runs in nine overs by the hosts Rwanda, making it the lowest team total in a completed WT20I match. The Rwandan side chased down the target of seven runs in just four balls to win the match by ten wickets with 116 balls to spare. In the fifth match of the tournament against Mali, Uganda went on to score 314/2 in 20 overs, making it the highest team total in Women's Twenty20 internationals. It was the first time in a T20 international cricket match, male or female, that a team had scored 300 runs. The Mali team were bowled out for 10 runs in 11.1 overs, the second lowest team total in WT20Is. The margin of victory (304 runs) was also the biggest ever in a WT20I match.

The seventh edition of the tournament was scheduled to take place in June 2020, but was postponed until the following year due to the COVID-19 pandemic.

== Squads ==
Mali	Rwanda	Tanzania	Uganda
Youma Sangare (c); Ramata Cisse; Balkissa Coulibaly; Maimouna Coulibaly; Coumba Diarra; Mala Djiguiba; Sirantou Kagnassy; Tenin Konate; Aicha Kone; Mariam Samake; Aissata Sangare; Mariam Sidibe; Oumou Sow; Nafoutouma Traore	Sarah Uwera (c); Marie Bimenyimana; Diane Dusabemungu; Alice Ikuzwe; Sifa Ingabire; Veronique Iriho; Gisele Ishimwe; Henriette Ishimwe; Immaculee Muhawenimana; Delphine Mukarurangwa; Josiane Nyirankundineza; Cathia Uwamahoro; Antoinette Uwimbabazi; Margueritte Vumiliya	Fatuma Kibasu (c); Zinaida Jeremiah; Perice Kamunya; Winfrida Kevin; Catherine Kibuge; Hudaa Mohamedi; Nasra Mohamedi; Shufaa Mohamedi; Saum Mtae; Tabu Omary; Monica Pascal; Neema Pius; Nasra Saidi; Nuru Tindo	Rita Musamali (c); Prosscovia Alako; Christine Anayo; Midred Anyingo; Evelyn Anyipo; Joyce Apio; Damalie Busingye; Esther Iloku; Maria Kagoya; Susan Kakai; Immaculate Nakisuuyi; Stephanie Nampiina; Gloria Obukor; Sarah Walaza

== Round-robin ==
=== Points table ===
Team	P	W	L	T	NR	Pts	NRR
Tanzania	6	6	0	0	0	12	+4.304
Uganda	6	4	2	0	0	8	+4.178
Rwanda	6	2	4	0	0	4	+1.565
Mali	6	0	6	0	0	0	–13.314

=== Matches ===
18 June 2019
09:30
Scorecard

Tanzania; 113/9 (20 overs)	v	Uganda; 108/9 (20 overs)
Monica Pascal 53 (53); Joyce Apio 2/19 (4 overs)		Esther Iloku 38* (26); Perice Kamunya 3/14 (4 overs)

Tanzania won by 5 runs
Gahanga International Cricket Stadium, Kigali
Umpires: John Mayeku (Uga) and Vicky Prajapati (Rwa)
Player of the match: Monica Pascal (Tan)

- Tanzania won the toss and elected to bat.
- Winfrida Kevin, Hudaa Mohamedi (Tan), Prosscovia Alako, Esther Iloku, Maria Kagoya and Susan Kakai (Uga) all made their WT20I debuts.

18 June 2019
13:50
Scorecard

Mali; 6 (9 overs)	v	Rwanda; 8/0 (0.4 overs)
Mariam Samake 1 (6); Josiane Nyirankundineza 3/0 (2 overs)		Josiane Nyirankundineza 5* (2)

Rwanda won by 10 wickets
Gahanga International Cricket Stadium, Kigali
Umpires: Jackson Nzayisenga (Rwa) and Vicky Prajapati (Rwa)
Player of the match: Josiane Nyirankundineza (Rwa)

- Mali won the toss and elected to bat.
- Ramata Cisse, Balkissa Coulibaly, Maimouna Coulibaly, Sirantou Kagnassy, Tenin Konate, Aicha Kone, Mariam Samake, Aissata Sangare, Youma Sangare, Oumou Sow and Nafoutouma Traore (Mli) all made their WT20I debuts.
- The six runs scored by Mali Women was the lowest team total in a completed WT20I match.

19 June 2019
09:30
Scorecard

Mali; 11 (15.4 overs)	v	Tanzania; 14/0 (0.4 overs)
Oumou Sow 3 (18); Nuru Tindo 2/1 (3.4 overs)		Monica Pascal 11* (3)

Tanzania won by 10 wickets
Gahanga International Cricket Stadium, Kigali
Umpires: John Mayeku (Uga) and Vicky Prajapati (Rwa)
Player of the match: Nuru Tindo (Tan)

- Mali won the toss and elected to bat.
- Coumba Diarra (Mli), Catherine Kibuge and Nasra Mohamedi (Tan) all made their WT20I debuts.

19 June 2019
13:50
Scorecard

Uganda; 91/6 (20 overs)	v	Rwanda; 61 (18.3 overs)
Esther Iloku 31* (35); Marie Bimenyimana 2/19 (4 overs)		Diane Dusabemungu 13 (27); Stephani Nampiina 3/17 (4 overs)

Uganda won by 30 runs
Gahanga International Cricket Stadium, Kigali
Umpires: John Mayeku (Uga) and Jackson Nzayisenga (Rwa)
Player of the match: Rita Musamali (Uga)

- Uganda won the toss and elected to bat.
- Christine Anayo, Mildred Anyigo and Gloria Obukor (Uga) all made their WT20I debuts.

20 June 2019
09:30
Scorecard

Uganda; 314/2 (20 overs)	v	Mali; 10 (11.1 overs)
Prosscovia Alako 116 (71); Aicha Kone 1/59 (4 overs)		Tenin Konate 4 (14); Mildred Anyigo 3/1 (1.1 overs)

Uganda won by 304 runs
Gahanga International Cricket Stadium, Kigali
Umpires: Jackson Nzayisenga (Rwa) and Vicky Prajapati (Rwa)
Player of the match: Prosscovia Alako (Uga)

- Uganda won the toss and elected to bat.
- Mala Djiguiba and Mariam Sidibe (Mli) made their WT20I debuts.
- Uganda's 314/2 was the highest total in a WT20I match.
- The margin of victory (304 runs) is the biggest ever in a WT20I match.
- Mali now have the three lowest totals in women's T20 Internationals, having achieved those on three consecutive days.
- This was the first time when two batters scored centuries in the same innings of a WT20I match.
- Prosscovia Alako became the first player for Uganda to score a century in Women's T20 internationals.
- The 227-run partnership between Prosscovia Alako and Rita Musamali (Uga) was the highest for any wicket in Women's T20 Internationals.
- The bowling figures of 3-0-82-0 by Oumou Sow (Mli) are the most expensive in women's Twenty20 cricket.

20 June 2019
13:50
Scorecard

Tanzania; 105/7 (20 overs)	v	Rwanda; 91/8 (20 overs)
Monica Pascal 40 (41); Henriette Ishimwe 2/25 (4 overs)		Cathia Uwamahoro 28 (25); Fatuma Kibasu 2/22 (4 overs)

Tanzania won by 14 runs
Gahanga International Cricket Stadium, Kigali
Umpires: John Mayeku (Uga) and Vicky Prajapati (Rwa)
Player of the match: Monica Pascal (Tan)

- Rwanda won the toss and elected to field.

21 June 2019
09:30
Scorecard

Rwanda; 246/1 (20 overs)	v	Mali; 30/9 (20 overs)
Marie Bimenyimana 114* (81); Aicha Kone 1/26 (4 overs)		Mariam Samake 9* (24); Diane Dusabemungu 4/5 (4 overs)

Rwanda won by 216 runs
Gahanga International Cricket Stadium, Kigali
Umpires: Vicky Prajapati (Rwa) and John Mayeku (Uga)
Player of the match: Marie Bimenyimana (Rwa)

- Mali won the toss and elected to field.
- Marie Bimenyimana became the first player for Rwanda to score a century in women's T20 Internationals.

21 June 2019
13:50
Scorecard

Uganda; 109/4 (20 overs)	v	Tanzania; 113/4 (19.1 overs)
Rita Musamali 43* (49); Perice Kamunya 2/12 (4 overs)		Fatuma Kibasu 54* (58); Joyce Apio 2/18 (4 overs)

Tanzania won by 6 wickets
Gahanga International Cricket Stadium, Kigali
Umpires: Gasana Christian (Rwa) and John Mayeku (Uga)
Player of the match: Fatuma Kibasu (Tan)

- Uganda won the toss and elected to bat.

22 June 2019
09:30
Scorecard

Tanzania; 285/1 (20 overs)	v	Mali; 17 (12.5 overs)
Fatuma Kibasu 106* (71); Youma Sangare 1/54 (4 overs)		Mariam Samake 4* (6); Nasra Saidi 5/0 (2.2 overs)

Tanzania won by 268 runs
Gahanga International Cricket Stadium, Kigali
Umpires: Jackson Nzayisenga (Rwa) and Vicky Prajapati (Rwa)
Player of the match: Fatuma Kibasu (Tan)

- Tanzania won the toss and elected to bat.
- Fatuma Kibasu became the first player for Tanzania to score a century in Women's T20 Internationals.

22 June 2019
13:50
Scorecard

Rwanda; 80/6 (20 overs)	v	Uganda; 81/2 (15 overs)
Marie Bimenyimana 36 (50); Evelyn Anyipo 2/7 (2 overs)		Gloria Obukor 33 (42); Immaculee Muhawenimana 1/10 (overs)

Uganda won by 8 wickets
Gahanga International Cricket Stadium, Kigali
Umpires: John Mayeku (Uga) and Jackson Nzayisenga (Rwa)
Player of the match: Prosscovia Alako (Uga)

- Rwanda won the toss and elected to bat.

23 June 2019
09:30
Scorecard

Mali; 14 (7.4 overs)	v	Uganda; 18/0 (1.4 overs)
Balkissa Coulibaly 1 (18); Joyce Apio 4/2 (4 overs)		Prosscovia Alako 9* (8)

Uganda won by 10 wickets
Gahanga International Cricket Stadium, Kigali
Umpires: John Mayeku (Uga) and Jackson Nzayisenga (Rwa)
Player of the match: Joyce Apio (Uga)

- Mali won the toss and elected to bat.

23 June 2019
13:50
Scorecard

Tanzania; 125/7 (20 overs)	v	Rwanda; 55/9 (20 overs)
Neema Pius 38 (37); Marie Bimenyimana 3/8 (4 overs)		Gisele Ishimwe 19 (44); Nuru Tindo 2/7 (4 overs)

Tanzania won by 70 runs
Gahanga International Cricket Stadium, Kigali
Umpires: John Mayeku (Uga) and Jackson Nzayisenga (Rwa)
Player of the match: Neema Pius (Tan)

- Tanzania won the toss and elected to bat.
