= Gertrude Candiru =

Ugandan cricketer (born 1994)

Personal information
- Full name: Gertrude Candiru
- Born: 20 August 1994 (age 32)
- Batting: Right-handed
- Bowling: Right-arm medium

International information
- National sides: Uganda (2018–2018); Qatar (2025–present)
- T20I debut (cap 4/30): 7 July 2018; Uganda v Scotland
- Last T20I: 14 February 2026; Qatar v Oman
- Source: ESPNCricinfo, 15 February 2026

Gertrude Candiru (born 20 August 1994) is a Ugandan women's cricketer. In July 2018, she was named in Uganda's squad for the 2018 ICC Women's World Twenty20 Qualifier tournament. She made her Women's Twenty20 International (WT20I) debut for Uganda against Scotland during that tournament on 7 July 2018.

== Career ==
Candiru has been with the Charity women cricket club as they have retained the Mehta T20 club cricket league title as registered in 2013 for the third time in a row. Charity won by 21 runs that year against Tornado their counterparts.

== See also ==
- Uganda national women's cricket team
- Women's cricket in Uganda
- ICC Women's World Twenty20 Qualifier
- Kevin Awino
- Joyce Apio
