= Mary Nalule =

Ugandan cricketer (born 1997)

Personal information
- Full name: Mary Nalule
- Born: 16 July 1997 (age 29)
- Batting: Right-handed

International information
- National side: Uganda
- Only T20I (cap 12): 8 July 2018 v Thailand

Career statistics
Competition	WT20I
Matches	1
Runs scored	3
Batting average	3.00
100s/50s	0/0
Top score	3
Catches/stumpings	0/–
- Source: Cricinfo, 25 September 2025

Mary Nalule (born 16 July 1997) is a Ugandan cricketer. In July 2018, she was named in Uganda's squad for the 2018 ICC Women's World Twenty20 Qualifier tournament. She made her Women's Twenty20 International (WT20I) debut for Uganda against Thailand in the World Twenty20 Qualifier on 8 July 2018. As of September 2025, that remains her only WT20I match.

== See also ==
- Davis Arinaitwe
- Zephania Arinaitwe
- Joyce Apio
- Concy Aweko
- Kevin Awino
