= Nalule =

Nalule is a surname. Notable people with the surname include:

- Mary Nalule (born 1997), Ugandan cricketer
- Safia Juuko Nalule (born 1966), Ugandan activist
