= List of Papua New Guinea women ODI cricketers =

This is a list of Papua New Guinea Women One-day International cricketers.

In May 2022, the ICC awarded WODI status to Papua New Guinea along with the Netherlands, Scotland, Thailand and the United States;

Papua New Guinea toured Zimbabwe in March 2024, during which they played their first WODI match. This list comprises all members of the Papua New Guinea women's cricket team who have played at least one WODI match. It is initially arranged in the order in which each player won her first ODI cap. Where more than one player won her first WODI cap in the same match, those players are listed alphabetically by surname.

== Key ==
General

- ‡ – Captain
- † – Wicket-keeper
- First – Year of debut
- Last – Year of latest game
- Mat – Number of matches played

Batting

- Runs – Runs scored in career
- HS – Highest score
- Avg – Runs scored per dismissal
- * – Batsman remained not out
- 50 – Half-centuries scored

Bowling

- Balls – Balls bowled in career
- Wkt – Wickets taken in career
- BBI – Best bowling in an innings
- Ave – Average runs per wicket

Fielding

- Ca – Catches taken
- St – Stumpings affected

== List of players ==
Updated as of 17 August 2026

Papua New Guinea women ODI cricketers
General					Batting					Bowling				Fielding		Ref
No.	Name	First	Last	Mat	Runs	HS	Avg	50	100	Balls	Wkt	BBI	Ave	Ca	St	Ref
1	Vicky Araa	2024	2024	9	74	21	10.57	0	0	350	10	4/19	24.10	0	0	
2	Vicky Buruka	2024	2026	9	2	2*	0.50	0	0	312	6	2/22	38.33	0	0	
3	Sibona Jimmy	2024	2026	12	169	57	14.08	1	0	566	17	4/22	19.82	9	0	
4	Lakshmi Rajadurai	2024	2025	8	136	45	17.00	0	0	6	0	–	–	0	0	
5	Tanya Ruma	2024	2026	12	275	80*	25.00	2	0	42	2	2/17	15.00	6	0	
6	Pauke Siaka	2024	2026	15	325	60	23.21	2	0	493	18	4/18	13.44	6	0	
7	Brenda Tau‡†	2024	2026	16	252	72	16.80	1	0	–	–	–	–	8	5	
8	Henao Thomas	2024	2026	16	151	30	10.78	0	0	799	24	4/28	20.45	8	0	
9	Geua Tom	2024	2025	10	55	23	7.85	0	0	306	7	2/29	30.85	1	0	
10	Isabel Toua	2024	2025	13	70	14	6.36	0	0	613	14	4/38	28.92	3	0	
11	Naoani Vare	2024	2025	13	192	44	14.76	0	0	–	–	–	–	1	0	
12	Kevau Frank	2024	2026	9	81	31	10.12	0	0	–	–	–	–	1	0	
13	Melanie Ani	2024	2024	2	0	0	0.00	0	0	–	–	–	–	0	0	
14	Dika Lohia	2024	2026	7	25	8*	5.00	0	0	160	7	2/12	19.42	2	0	
15	Hollan Doriga	2025	2026	5	95	48	19.00	0	0	6	0	–	–	2	0	
16	Erani Pokana	2025	2026	2	1	1	0.50	0	0	–	–	–	–	0	0	
17	Mairi Tom	2025	2025	4	3	3*	3.00	0	0	150	1	1/29	92.00	1	0	
18	Konio Oala	2025	2025	3	29	22	9.66	0	0	60	2	1/12	19.00	1	0	
19	Miria Raio	2025	2025	2	6	4*	6.00	0	0	–	–	–	–	0	0	
20	Hane Tau	2025	2026	4	8	6*	8.00	0	0	102	2	2/55	47.50	0	0	

== See also ==
- List of Papua New Guinea women Twenty20 International cricketers
