= List of Scotland women Twenty20 International cricketers =

This is a list of Scottish women Twenty20 International cricketers. A Twenty20 International is an international cricket match between two representative teams. A Twenty20 International is played under the rules of Twenty20 cricket. In April 2018, the International Cricket Council (ICC) granted full international status to Twenty20 women's matches played between member sides from 1 July 2018 onwards. The Scotland women's team made their Twenty20 International debut on 7 July against Uganda in Amstelveen during the 2018 ICC Women's World Twenty20 Qualifier.

The list is arranged in the order in which each player won her first Twenty20 cap. Where more than one player won her first Twenty20 cap in the same match, those players are listed alphabetically by surname.

== Key ==
General

- ‡ – Captain
- † – Wicket-keeper
- First – Year of debut
- Last – Year of latest game
- Mat – Number of matches played

Fielding

- Ca – Catches taken
- St – Stumpings taken

Batting

- Runs – Runs scored in career
- HS – Highest score
- Avg – Average runs scored per dismissal
- 50s – Number of half centuries
- * – Batsman remained not out

Bowling

- Balls – Balls bowled in career
- Wkt – Wickets taken in career
- BBI – Best bowling in an innings
- Ave – Average runs conceded per wicket

== Players ==
Statistics are correct as of 26 June 2026.

| General | | | | | Batting | | | | Bowling | | | | Fielding | | Ref |
| No. | Name | First | Last | Mat | Runs | HS | Avg | 50 | Balls | Wkt | BBI | Ave | Ca | St | Ref |
|---|---|---|---|---|---|---|---|---|---|---|---|---|---|---|---|
| 1 | Abbi Aitken-Drummond | 2018 | 2024 | 27 | 169 | 43 | 11.26 | 0 | 148 | 4 | 2/3 | 32.75 | 10 | 0 | |
| 2 | Kathryn Bryce‡ | 2018 | 2026 | 65 | 1,650 | 73* | 34.37 | 13 | 1,293 | 73 | 4/8 | 15.12 | 37 | 0 | |
| 3 | Sarah Bryce‡† | 2018 | 2026 | 84 | 1,888 | 67 | 30.45 | 5 | – | – | – | – | 40 | 42 | |
| 4 | Priyanaz Chatterji | 2018 | 2026 | 83 | 645 | 45* | 14.33 | 0 | 1062 | 48 | 3/5 | 21.62 | 17 | 0 | |
| 5 | Becky Glen | 2018 | 2021 | 28 | 238 | 60 | 13.22 | 1 | 48 | 1 | 1/17 | 68.00 | 8 | 0 | |
| 6 | Laura Grant | 2018 | 2018 | 5 | – | – | – | – | – | – | – | – | 0 | 0 | |
| 7 | Lorna Jack-Brown | 2018 | 2024 | 56 | 558 | 57* | 15.08 | 2 | – | – | – | – | 2 | 0 | |
| 8 | Abtaha Maqsood‡ | 2018 | 2026 | 78 | 47 | 9 | 3.35 | 0 | 1,378 | 73 | 3/8 | 17.72 | 24 | 0 | |
| 9 | Katie McGill | 2018 | 2022 | 34 | 158 | 22 | 9.29 | 0 | 515 | 33 | 3/13 | 16.00 | 6 | 0 | |
| 10 | Hannah Rainey | 2018 | 2026 | 43 | 13 | 5* | 2.16 | 0 | 606 | 26 | 3/15 | 21.73 | 5 | 0 | |
| 11 | Rachel Hawkins | 2018 | 2019 | 16 | 63 | 16* | 7.87 | 0 | 340 | 16 | 4/10 | 14.62 | 2 | 0 | |
| 12 | Ruth Willis | 2018 | 2019 | 16 | 57 | 13* | 5.70 | 0 | 12 | 0 | – | – | 0 | 0 | |
| 13 | Megan McColl | 2019 | 2026 | 63 | 453 | 50 | 13.32 | 1 | 223 | 13 | 5/3 | 15.38 | 10 | 0 | |
| 14 | Samantha Haggo | 2019 | 2023 | 13 | 50 | 18* | 10.00 | 0 | 90 | 6 | 2/10 | 14.33 | 1 | 0 | |
| 15 | Katherine Fraser | 2019 | 2026 | 65 | 515 | 56* | 16.61 | 1 | 1160 | 69 | 4/19 | 16.04 | 14 | 0 | |
| 16 | Charis Scott | 2019 | 2022 | 6 | 15 | 9 | 3.75 | 0 | 6 | 0 | – | – | 2 | 0 | |
| 17 | Ellen Watson† | 2019 | 2026 | 34 | 220 | 30* | 10.47 | 0 | – | – | – | – | 12 | 2 | |
| 18 | Abbie Hogg | 2019 | 2019 | 1 | – | – | – | – | 12 | 0 | – | – | 0 | 0 | |
| 19 | Ailsa Lister† | 2021 | 2026 | 60 | 807 | 68* | 16.81 | 4 | – | – | – | – | 19 | 1 | |
| 20 | Rachel Slater | 2022 | 2026 | 42 | 117 | 21 | 6.88 | 0 | 743 | 40 | 5/17 | 20.37 | 2 | 0 | |
| 21 | Saskia Horley | 2022 | 2024 | 17 | 323 | 61* | 20.18 | 2 | 120 | 6 | 3/13 | 23.66 | 4 | 0 | |
| 22 | Olivia Bell | 2022 | 2026 | 24 | 17 | 5* | 5.66 | 0 | 420 | 27 | 5/8 | 16.00 | 3 | 0 | |
| 23 | Darcey Carter | 2023 | 2026 | 47 | 1080 | 76* | 28.42 | 10 | 348 | 19 | 3/11 | 18.36 | 28 | 0 | |
| 24 | Nayma Sheikh | 2023 | 2024 | 7 | 6 | 5* | – | 0 | 102 | 6 | 4/14 | 13.66 | 0 | 0 | |
| 25 | Chloe Abel | 2023 | 2026 | 31 | 71 | 25 | 10.14 | 0 | 415 | 24 | 5/13 | 17.79 | 5 | 0 | |
| 26 | Maryam Faisal | 2023 | 2024 | 6 | 24 | 8 | 4.80 | 0 | – | – | – | – | 1 | 0 | |
| 27 | Niamh Robertson-Jack | 2023 | 2025 | 6 | – | – | – | – | 94 | 7 | 3/17 | 15.00 | 1 | 0 | |
| 28 | Mollie Parker | 2025 | 2025 | 2 | 3 | 3* | – | 0 | 36 | 2 | 1/5 | 12.00 | 0 | 0 | |
| 29 | Pippa Sproul | 2026 | 2026 | 4 | 54 | 27* | 18.00 | 0 | – | – | – | – | 0 | 0 | |
| 30 | Kirstie Gordon (Note: Kirstie Gordon had played 5 WT20I matches for England. Only her records for Scotland are given above.) | 2026 | 2026 | 9 | 28 | 23* | 14.00 | 0 | 204 | 12 | 3/16 | 18.08 | 3 | 0 | |
| 31 | Gabriella Fontenla | 2026 | 2026 | 7 | 6 | 3 | 3.00 | 0 | 90 | 1 | 1/11 | 118.00 | 4 | 0 | |
| 32 | Maisie Maceira | 2026 | 2026 | 1 | 2 | 2* | – | 0 | 18 | 2 | 2/23 | 11.50 | 0 | 0 | |

== See also ==
- List of Scotland women ODI cricketers
