= Janet Mbabazi =

Ugandan cricketer (born 1996)

Personal information
- Full name: Janet Mbabazi
- Born: 26 January 1996 (age 30); Entebbe, Uganda
- Batting: Right-handed
- Bowling: Right-arm medium
- Role: All-rounder

International information
- National side: Uganda
- T20I debut (cap 6): 7 July 2018 v Scotland
- Last T20I: 7 June 2024 v Cameroon

Career statistics
Competition	WT20I
Matches	81
Runs scored	964
Batting average	14.83
100s/50s	0/0
Top score	42*
Balls bowled	1,309
Wickets	80
Bowling average	12.13
5 wickets in innings	0
10 wickets in match	0
Best bowling	4/12
Catches/stumpings	28/0
- Source: Cricinfo, 7 October 2024

Janet Mbabazi (born 26 January 1996) is a Ugandan cricketer. In July 2018, she was named in Uganda's squad for the 2018 ICC Women's World Twenty20 Qualifier tournament. She made her Women's Twenty20 International (WT20I) debut for Uganda against Scotland in the World Twenty20 Qualifier on 7 July 2018. In April 2019, she was named as the vice-captain of Uganda's squad for the 2019 ICC Women's Qualifier Africa tournament in Zimbabwe.

== Career ==
In March 2023, Mbabazi became one of the Uganda Cricket Association's first twelve women players to be awarded central contracts. In 2025, at the 11th Kwibuka T20 Tournament in Kigali, Rwanda, her performance as the Victoria Pearls captain was spotlighted.

== See also ==
- Joyce Apio
- Concy Aweko
- Kevin Awino
- Naome Bagenda
- William Kamanyi
