= List of Uganda women Twenty20 International cricketers =

This is a list of Ugandan women Twenty20 International cricketers. A Twenty20 International is an international cricket match between two representative teams. A Twenty20 International is played under the rules of Twenty20 cricket. In April 2018, the International Cricket Council (ICC) granted full international status to Twenty20 women's matches played between member sides from 1 July 2018 onwards. The Uganda women's team made their Twenty20 International debut on 7 July against Scotland in Amstelveen during the 2018 ICC Women's World Twenty20 Qualifier.

The list is arranged in the order in which each player won her first Twenty20 cap. Where more than one player won her first Twenty20 cap in the same match, they are listed alphabetically by surname.

== Key ==
General

- ‡ – Captain
- † – Wicket-keeper
- First – Year of debut
- Last – Year of latest game
- Mat – Number of matches played

Batting

- Runs – Runs scored in career
- HS – Highest score
- Avg – Runs scored per dismissal
- * – Batsman remained not out
- 50 – Half-centuries scored
- 100 – Centuries scored

Bowling

- Wkt – Wickets taken in career
- BBI – Best bowling in an innings
- Ave – Average runs per wicket

Fielding

- Ca – Catches taken
- St – Stumpings affected

== Players ==
Statistics are correct as of 14 November 2026.

Uganda women T20I cricketers
General					Batting					Bowling				Fielding		Ref
No.	Name	First	Last	Mat	Runs	HS	50	100	Avg	Balls	Wkt	BBI	Ave	Ca	St	Ref
1	Joyce Apio	2018	2019	13	18	9*	0	0	3.60	186	14	4/2	7.57	0	0	
2	Concy Aweko‡	2018	2026	129	157	22*	0	0	6.03	2,877	153	4/6	12.24	31	0	
3	Kevin Awino‡†	2018	2026	116	1,040	95*	3	0	15.07	–	–	–	–	49	34	
4	Gertrude Candiru (Note: Getrude Chandiru also played WT20I matches for Qatar. Only her record for Uganda is given above.)	2018	2018	5	69	43*	0	0	23.00	90	4	2/11	18.75	1	0	
5	Saidati Kemigisha	2018	2018	2	7	7	0	0	3.50	–	–	–	–	0	0	
6	Janet Mbabazi‡	2018	2026	133	1,794	63*	4	0	16.45	2,071	133	4/12	12.42	46	0	
7	Rita Musamali‡	2018	2026	139	1,891	103*	2	1	21.91	562	24	3/11	21.75	46	0	
8	Franklin Najjumba	2018	2022	16	114	26*	0	0	12.66	102	3	1/13	27.33	5	0	
9	Immaculate Nakisuuyi‡	2018	2026	121	1,678	68*	2	0	19.74	1,453	72	4/15	16.75	33	0	
10	Carol Namugenyi	2018	2018	5	2	2*	0	0	2.00	84	1	1/1	57.00	0	0	
11	Racheal Ntono†‡	2018	2021	16	115	25	0	0	7.18	–	–	–	–	0	0	
12	Mary Nalule	2018	2018	1	3	3	0	0	3.00	–	–	–	–	0	0	
13	Stephani Nampiina	2018	2026	118	1,350	53	2	0	16.87	689	47	6/8	13.08	35	0	
14	Prico Nakitende	2018	2018	1	1	1	0	0	1.00	–	–	–	–	0	0	
15	Naome Bagenda	2019	2022	22	183	34	0	0	12.20	–	–	–	–	8	0	
16	Damalie Busingye	2019	2019	11	172	65*	1	0	19.11	92	5	3/19	17.80	2	0	
17	Evelyn Anyipo	2019	2025	60	96	17*	0	0	5.33	1,015	47	4/1	16.40	14	0	
18	Sarah Walaza	2019	2026	48	36	10	0	0	2.76	737	31	3/6	21.87	9	0	
19	Prosscovia Alako	2019	2026	98	1,288	116	2	2	16.30	72	2	1/7	26.50	25	0	
20	Esther Iloku†	2019	2026	67	817	49	0	0	15.71	–	–	–	–	9	6	
21	Maria Kagoya†	2019	2019	4	2	2*	0	0	–	–	–	–	–	1	0	
22	Susan Kakai	2019	2022	12	20	10*	0	0	6.66	70	5	2/1	7.80	2	0	
23	Christine Anayo	2019	2019	4	1	1*	0	0	–	24	1	1/4	12.00	0	0	
24	Mildred Anyigo	2019	2019	5	–	–	–	–	–	47	5	3/1	6.00	0	0	
25	Gloria Obukor	2019	2024	22	319	72	0	0	18.76	54	0	–	–	1	0	
26	Irene Alumo	2021	2023	31	28	21*	0	0	4.00	590	31	3/3	13.00	1	0	
27	Patricia Malemikia	2021	2025	26	27	16	0	0	4.50	439	20	5/6	15.55	4	0	
28	Sarah Akiteng	2022	2026	73	13	4	0	0	1.85	1,504	67	5/14	17.35	14	0	
29	Leona Babirye	2022	2022	11	57	20	0	0	5.18	–	–	–	–	1	0	
30	Phiona Kulume	2022	2026	64	227	20*	0	0	9.86	474	22	6/11	18.68	9	0	
31	Rita Nyangendo	2022	2022	13	69	18	0	0	8.62	–	–	–	–	1	0	
32	Shakirah Sadick	2022	2025	8	37	16	0	0	9.25	–	–	–	–	1	0	
33	Mohammed Jimia†	2022	2024	6	62	24	0	0	10.33	–	–	–	–	4	2	
34	Malisa Ariokot	2023	2026	55	192	24*	0	0	10.66	435	17	3/9	19.52	10	0	
35	Lorna Anyait	2023	2024	23	30	8*	0	0	6.00	444	15	3/19	19.06	8	0	
36	Asumin Akurut	2024	2026	16	16	10*	0	0	4.00	247	17	3/11	11.11	3	0	
37	Immaculate Nandera	2024	2024	2	–	–	–	–	–	42	1	1/22	36.00	0	0	
38	Patricia Timong	2024	2024	3	25	22	0	0	12.50	60	8	4/4	4.37	0	0	
39	Irene Mutoni	2025	2026	13	2	2*	0	0	–	222	13	3/10	14.15	0	0	
40	Kevin Amuge	2025	2025	20	1	1	0	0	0.33	378	27	5/19	10.11	4	0	
41	Sarah Tino	2025	2025	8	–	–	–	–	–	168	9	3/20	13.77	0	0	
42	Teddy Oyella	2025	2025	3	–	–	–	–	–	72	5	4/19	7.40	0	0	
43	Naume Amongin	2025	2025	7	5	3*	0	0	5.00	126	6	3/12	11.50	1	0	
44	Kampi Nainhabo	2026	2026	1	1	1	0	0	1.00	18	1	1/18	18.00	1	0	
