= Esther Corder =

Dutch cricketer (born 1998)

Personal information
- Full name: Esther Else Corder
- Born: 28 July 1998 (age 28)
- Batting: Right-handed
- Bowling: Right-arm medium

International information
- National side: Netherlands
- T20I debut (cap 25): 7 July 2018 v UAE
- Last T20I: 14 July 2018 v UAE
- Source: ESPNcricinfo, 14 July

Esther Corder (born 28 July 1998) is a Dutch cricketer. She played for the Netherlands women's national cricket team in the 2015 ICC Women's World Twenty20 Qualifier in November 2015.

In June 2018, she was named in the Netherlands' squad for the 2018 ICC Women's World Twenty20 Qualifier tournament. It was in that tournament that she made her Women's Twenty20 International (WT20I) debut for the Netherlands, against United Arab Emirates on 7 July 2018.

In May 2019, she was named in Netherlands' squad for the 2019 ICC Women's Qualifier Europe tournament in Spain.
