= Ruth Willis =

Scottish cricketer (born 1989)

Personal information
- Full name: Ruth Katherine Willis
- Born: 6 March 1989 (age 37); Crewe, Cheshire, England
- Batting: Right-handed
- Bowling: Right-arm medium

International information
- National side: Scotland
- T20I debut (cap 12): 10 July 2018 v Thailand
- Last T20I: 3 September 2019 v Bangladesh
- Source: Cricinfo, 3 September 2019

Ruth Willis (born 6 March 1989) is a Scottish cricketer. In July 2018, she was named in Scotland's squad for the 2018 ICC Women's World Twenty20 Qualifier tournament. She made her Women's Twenty20 International (WT20I) debut for Scotland against Thailand in the World Twenty20 Qualifier on 10 July 2018.

In May 2019, she was named in Scotland's squad for the 2019 ICC Women's Qualifier Europe tournament in Spain. In August 2019, she was named in Scotland's squad for the 2019 ICC Women's World Twenty20 Qualifier tournament in Scotland.
