= Saidati Kemigisha =

Ugandan cricketer (born 1998)

Personal information
- Full name: Saidati Kemigisha
- Born: 12 September 1998 (age 28)
- Batting: Right-handed
- Bowling: Right-arm medium

International information
- National side: Uganda
- T20I debut (cap 5): 7 July 2018 v Scotland
- Last T20I: 8 July 2018 v Thailand

Career statistics
Competition	WT20I
Matches	2
Runs scored	7
Batting average	3.50
100s/50s	0/0
Top score	7
Catches/stumpings	0/0
- Source: Cricinfo, 6 October 2021

Saidati Kemigisha (born 12 September 1998) is a Ugandan cricketer. In July 2018, she was named in Uganda's squad for the 2018 ICC Women's World Twenty20 Qualifier tournament. She made her Women's Twenty20 International (WT20I) debut against Scotland in the World Twenty20 Qualifier on 7 July 2018.
