= Cher van Slobbe =

Dutch cricketer (born 1995)

Personal information
- Full name: Cher Carline van Slobbe
- Born: 10 September 1995 (age 31)
- Batting: Right-handed
- Bowling: Right-arm medium

International information
- National side: Netherlands
- T20I debut (cap 31): 7 July 2018 v UAE
- Last T20I: 14 July 2018 v UAE
- Source: ESPNcricinfo, 14 July

Cher van Slobbe (born 10 September 1995) is a Dutch cricketer. She played for the Netherlands women's national cricket team in the 2015 ICC Women's World Twenty20 Qualifier in November 2015.

In June 2018, she was named in the Netherlands' squad for the 2018 ICC Women's World Twenty20 Qualifier tournament. She made her Women's Twenty20 International (WT20I) debut for the Netherlands against the United Arab Emirates in the World Twenty20 Qualifier on 7 July 2018. She was the leading wicket-taker for the Netherlands in the tournament, with five dismissals in five matches.
