= Laura Grant =

Scottish cricketer (born 2001)

Personal information
- Full name: Laura Grant
- Born: 25 April 2001 (age 25); Aberdeen, Scotland
- Batting: Right-handed
- Bowling: Right-arm medium

International information
- National side: Scotland
- T20I debut (cap 6): 7 July 2018 v Uganda
- Last T20I: 14 July 2018 v PNG
- Source: Cricinfo, 14 July 2018

Laura Grant (born 25 April 2001) is a Scottish cricketer. In July 2018, she was named in Scotland's squad for the 2018 ICC Women's World Twenty20 Qualifier tournament. She made her Women's Twenty20 International (WT20I) debut for Scotland against Uganda in the World Twenty20 Qualifier on 7 July 2018.
