= Mairi Tom =

Papua New Guinean cricketer

Personal information
- Full name: Mairi Tom
- Born: 28 June 1986 (age 40)
- Batting: Right-handed
- Bowling: Right-arm medium

International information
- National side: Papua New Guinea
- ODI debut (cap 17): 13 October 2025 v United Arab Emirates
- Last ODI: 15 October 2025 v United Arab Emirates
- T20I debut (cap 10): 7 July 2018 v Bangladesh
- Last T20I: 6 October 2022 v Vanuatu
Medal record
Representing Papua New Guinea
Women's Cricket
Pacific Games
Silver medal – second place	2019 Apia	Twenty20 International
- Source: Cricinfo, 8 October 2024

Mairi Tom is a Papua New Guinean cricketer. She played for the Papua New Guinea women's national cricket team in the 2017 Women's Cricket World Cup Qualifier in February 2017.

In June 2018, she was named in Papua New Guinea's squad for the 2018 ICC Women's World Twenty20 Qualifier tournament. She made her Women's Twenty20 International (WT20I) debut against Bangladesh in the World Twenty20 Qualifier on 7 July 2018. She was the leading wicket-taker for Papua New Guinea in the tournament, with five dismissals in five matches.

In April 2019, she was named in Papua New Guinea's squad for the 2019 ICC Women's Qualifier EAP tournament in Vanuatu, and in August the same year for the 2019 ICC Women's World Twenty20 Qualifier tournament in Scotland. In October 2021, she was named in Papua New Guinea's team for the 2021 Women's Cricket World Cup Qualifier tournament in Zimbabwe.
