= Rachel Hawkins =

Scottish cricketer

Personal information
- Full name: Rachel Valerie Hawkins
- Born: 31 January 1992 (age 34); Manchester, England
- Batting: Right-handed
- Bowling: Right-arm medium
- Role: All-rounder

International information
- National side: Scotland (2018–2019)
- T20I debut (cap 11): 7 July 2018 v Uganda
- Last T20I: 7 September 2019 v Netherlands

Domestic team information
- Years: Team
- 2008–2011: Nottinghamshire

Career statistics
Competition	WT20I	WLA	WT20
Matches	16	43	58
Runs scored	63	773	745
Batting average	7.87	20.34	18.62
100s/50s	0/0	0/5	0/2
Top score	16*	94*	61*
Balls bowled	340	1,176	849
Wickets	16	25	31
Bowling average	14.62	28.76	21.19
5 wickets in innings	0	0	0
10 wickets in match	0	0	0
Best bowling	4/10	2/6	4/10
Catches/stumpings	2/–	11/–	12/–
- Source: CricketArchive, 21 April 2022

Rachel Valerie Hawkins (née Scholes; born 31 January 1992) is a Scottish former cricketer who played as an all-rounder, batting right-handed and bowling right-arm medium. She played for Scotland between 2012 and 2019, including appearing in 16 Twenty20 Internationals in 2018 and 2019. She played domestic cricket for Nottinghamshire.

== International career ==
Hawkins played in the 2017 Women's Cricket World Cup Qualifier in February 2017. In June 2018, she was named in Scotland's squad for the 2018 ICC Women's World Twenty20 Qualifier tournament. During that tournament, she made her Women's Twenty20 International (WT20I) debut for Scotland against Uganda on 7 July 2018, where she was named the player of the match. She was the leading wicket-taker for Scotland in the tournament, with eight dismissals in five matches.

In May 2019, she was named in Scotland's squad for the 2019 ICC Women's Qualifier Europe tournament in Spain. In August 2019, she was named in Scotland's squad for the 2019 ICC Women's World Twenty20 Qualifier tournament in Scotland.

In September 2020, Hawkins announced her retirement from cricket.
