= Roopa Nagraj =

Indian-born Emirati cricketer (born 1983)

Personal information
- Full name: Roopa Nagraj
- Born: 2 January 1983 (age 43); India

International information
- National side: United Arab Emirates
- T20I debut (cap 9): 7 July 2018 v Netherlands
- Last T20I: 10 July 2018 v Bangladesh
- Source: Cricinfo, 10 July 2018

Roopa Nagraj (born 2 January 1983) is an Indian-born cricketer who plays for the United Arab Emirates national cricket team. In July 2018, she was named in the United Arab Emirates' squad for the 2018 ICC Women's World Twenty20 Qualifier tournament. She made her WT20I debut against Netherlands on 7 July 2018.
