= Subha Srinivasan =

Indian-born Emirati cricketer (born 1980)

Subha Venkataraman
Personal information
- Full name: Subha Venkataraman
- Born: 8 March 1980 (age 46); Chennai, Tamil Nadu, India
- Batting: Left-handed
- Bowling: Right-arm medium-fast
- Role: Allrounder

International information
- National side: United Arab Emirates
- T20I debut (cap 11): 7 July 2018 v Netherlands
- Last T20I: 23 November 2021 v Hong Kong

Domestic team information
- Years: Team
- 1999–2009: Tamil Nadu Women

Career statistics
Competition	WT20I
Matches	18
Runs scored	67
Batting average	6.70
100s/50s	0/0
Top score	22
Balls bowled	348
Wickets	21
Bowling average	11.19
5 wickets in innings	0
10 wickets in match	0
Best bowling	3/2
Catches/stumpings	5/0
- Source: Cricinfo, 12 January 2023

Subha Venkataraman is an Indian-born cricketer who plays for the United Arab Emirates national cricket team. In July 2018, she was named in the UAE squad for the 2018 ICC Women's World Twenty20 Qualifier tournament. She made her WT20I debut against Netherlands on 7 July 2018.

== Personal life ==
Subha was born on 8 March 1980 in Chennai. Along with cricket, she gave complete importance to her studies and did B.Sc. in computer science.

She currently lives in the UAE with her husband (R Srinivasan) and her two daughters, Akshaya and Akshara.

== Domestic career ==
She was selected in the Madras Under-19 team. At the age of 19 years, she was picked for the Tamil Nadu senior team.

Her first breakthrough came in 1999 when she took two (2) consecutive wickets and came close to a hat-trick in an All- India Senior Inter State South Zone match.
