= Jess Mills (cricketer) =

Scottish cricketer (born 1989)

Personal information
- Born: 18 November 1989 (age 36)

International information
- National side: Scotland
- Source: Cricinfo, 7 July 2018

Jess Mills (born 18 November 1989) is a Scottish cricketer. In July 2018, she was named in Scotland's squad for the 2018 ICC Women's World Twenty20 Qualifier tournament.
