= Arriya Yenyueak =

Thai cricketer (born 2000)

Personal information
- Born: 1 August 2000 (age 26)
- Batting: Right-handed
- Bowling: Right-arm medium

International information
- National side: Thailand
- T20I debut (cap 14): 14 January 2019 v Hong Kong
- Last T20I: 18 January 2019 v UAE

Career statistics
Competition	WT20I
Matches	3
Runs scored	–
Batting average	–
100s/50s	–/–
Top score	–
Balls bowled	1
Wickets	1
Bowling average	0.00
5 wickets in innings	0
10 wickets in match	0
Best bowling	1/0
Catches/stumpings	0/–
- Source: Cricinfo, 19 January 2019

Arriya Yenyueak (Thai:อารียา เย็นเยือก, born 1 August 2000) is a Thai cricketer. In July 2018, she was named in Thailand's squad for the 2018 ICC Women's World Twenty20 Qualifier tournament. She made her Women's Twenty20 International (WT20I) debut for Thailand against Hong Kong on 14 January 2019, in the Thailand Women's T20 Smash, taking a wicket with the one and only ball she bowled in the match.

In August 2019, she was named in Thailand's squad for the 2019 ICC Women's World Twenty20 Qualifier tournament in Scotland.
