= Becky Glen =

Scottish cricketer (born 1994)

Personal information
- Full name: Rebecca Shelagh Glen
- Born: 22 April 1994 (age 32); Edinburgh, Scotland
- Batting: Right-handed
- Bowling: Right-arm medium
- Role: Batter

International information
- National side: Scotland
- T20I debut (cap 5): 7 July 2018 v Uganda
- Last T20I: 30 August 2021 v France

Domestic team information
- Years: Team
- 2012: Yorkshire
- 2013–2019: Durham

Career statistics
Competition	WT20I
Matches	28
Runs scored	238
Batting average	13.22
100s/50s	0/1
Top score	60
Balls bowled	48
Wickets	1
Bowling average	68.00
5 wickets in innings	0
10 wickets in match	0
Best bowling	1/17
Catches/stumpings	8/–
- Source: Cricinfo, 21 April 2022

Rebecca Shelagh Glen (born 22 April 1994) is a Scottish cricketer. In July 2018, she was named in Scotland's squad for the 2018 ICC Women's World Twenty20 Qualifier tournament. She made her Women's Twenty20 International (WT20I) debut for Scotland against Uganda in the World Twenty20 Qualifier on 7 July 2018.

In May 2019, she was named in Scotland's squad for the 2019 ICC Women's Qualifier Europe tournament in Spain. In August 2019, she was named in Scotland's squad for the 2019 ICC Women's World Twenty20 Qualifier tournament in Scotland.
