= Stephani Nampiina =

Ugandan cricketer (born 2000)

Stephanie Nampiina
Personal information
- Full name: Stephanie Nampiina
- Born: 12 March 2000 (age 26); Namulesa, Butembe, Uganda
- Batting: Right-handed
- Bowling: Right-arm medium-fast

International information
- National side: Uganda
- T20I debut (cap 13): 8 July 2018 v Thailand
- Last T20I: 26 November 2024 v Thailand

Career statistics
Competition	WT20I
Matches	67
Runs scored	722
Batting average	16.79
100s/50s	0/1
Top score	51
Balls bowled	541
Wickets	33
Bowling average	15.21
5 wickets in innings	0
10 wickets in match	0
Best bowling	4/15
Catches/stumpings	23/–
- Source: ESPNcricinfo, 7 October 2024

Stephanie Nampiina (born 12 March 2000) is a Ugandan women's cricketer. In July 2018, she was named in Uganda's squad for the 2018 ICC Women's World Twenty20 Qualifier tournament. She made her WT20I debut against Thailand on 8 July 2018.

In April 2019, she was named in Uganda's squad for the 2019 ICC Women's Qualifier Africa tournament in Zimbabwe.

== See also ==
- Joyce Apio
- Concy Aweko
- Kevin Awino
- Davis Arinaitwe
- Zephania Arinaitwe
