= Priyanaz Chatterji =

Scottish cricketer

Personal information
- Full name: Priyanaz Anjum Chatterji
- Born: 12 August 1993 (age 33); Dundee, Scotland
- Batting: Right-handed
- Bowling: Right-arm medium
- Role: All-rounder

International information
- National side: Scotland
- ODI debut (cap 22): 17 October 2023 v Ireland
- Last ODI: 21 October 2023 v Ireland
- T20I debut (cap 4): 7 July 2018 v Uganda
- Last T20I: 24 October 2023 v Ireland
- T20I shirt no.: 7

Domestic team information
- Years: Team
- 2017–2019: Surrey
- 2019/20: Wellington
- 2022–present: Surrey
- 2022/23: Central Districts
- 2023–2024: South East Stars

Career statistics
Competition	WT20I
Matches	28
Runs scored	125
Batting average	10.41
100s/50s	0/0
Top score	26*
Balls bowled	400
Wickets	14
Bowling average	24.07
5 wickets in innings	0
10 wickets in match	0
Best bowling	3/5
Catches/stumpings	8/–
- Source: CricketArchive, 18 September 2022

Priyanaz Anjum Chatterji (born 12 August 1993) is a Scottish cricketer who plays as a right-handed batter and right-arm medium bowler. She played for the Scotland women's national cricket team in the 2017 Women's Cricket World Cup Qualifier in February 2017.

== Personal life ==
Chatterji was born to Indian Bengali economist Monojit Chatterji in Dundee, and also grew up in Australia.

== Career ==
In June 2018, she was named in Scotland's squad for the 2018 ICC Women's World Twenty20 Qualifier tournament. She made her Women's Twenty20 International (WT20I) debut for Scotland against Uganda in the World Twenty20 Qualifier on 7 July 2018.

In November 2018, she was named in the Women's Global Development Squad, to play fixtures against Women's Big Bash League (WBBL) clubs.

In May 2019, she was named in Scotland's squad for the 2019 ICC Women's Qualifier Europe tournament in Spain. In August 2019, she was named in Scotland's squad for the 2019 ICC Women's World Twenty20 Qualifier tournament in Scotland. In January 2022, she was named in Scotland's team for the 2022 Commonwealth Games Cricket Qualifier tournament in Malaysia.

In September 2024 she was named in the Scotland squad for the 2024 ICC Women's T20 World Cup.

Chatterji was part of the Scotland squad for the 2025 Women's Cricket World Cup Qualifier in Pakistan in April 2025.
