= Nisha Ali =

Indian-born Emirati cricketer (born 1986)

Personal information
- Born: 9 August 1986 (age 40); Bhopal, Madhya Pradesh
- Batting: Right-handed
- Bowling: Right-arm offbreak
- Role: Bowler

International information
- National side: United Arab Emirates
- T20I debut (cap 6): 7 July 2018 v Netherlands
- Last T20I: 14 July 2018 v Netherlands

Career statistics
Competition	T20I
Matches	5
Runs scored	115
Batting average	23.00
100s/50s	0/1
Top score	69
Balls bowled	82
Wickets	2
Bowling average	35.00
5 wickets in innings	0
10 wickets in match	0
Best bowling	1/7
Catches/stumpings	1/–
- Source: Cricinfo, 20 September 2020

Nisha Ali (born 9 August 1986) is an Indian-born cricketer who plays for the United Arab Emirates national cricket team. In July 2018, she was named in the United Arab Emirates' squad for the 2018 ICC Women's World Twenty20 Qualifier tournament. She made her WT20I debut against Netherlands on 7 July 2018.
