= Kopi John =

Papua New Guinean cricketer (1993–2019)

Personal information
- Full name: Kopi John
- Born: 10 October 1993
- Died: 27 August 2019 (aged 25)
- Batting: Right-handed
- Role: Wicket-keeper

International information
- National side: Papua New Guinea
- T20I debut (cap 5): 7 July 2018 v Bangladesh
- Last T20I: 14 July 2018 v Scotland
- Source: Cricinfo, 31 August 2019

Kopi John (10 October 1993 – 27 August 2019) was a Papua New Guinean cricketer. In July 2018, she was named in Papua New Guinea's squad for the 2018 ICC Women's World Twenty20 Qualifier tournament. She made her Women's Twenty20 International (WT20I) debut against Bangladesh in the World Twenty20 Qualifier on 7 July 2018. In April 2019, she was named in Papua New Guinea's squad for the 2019 ICC Women's Qualifier EAP tournament in Vanuatu.

John died on 27 August 2019 following a short illness. She was 25.
