= Namita D'souza =

Indian-born Emirati cricketer (born 2003)

Personal information
- Full name: Namita D'souza
- Born: 26 April 2003 (age 23); India
- Batting: Right-handed
- Bowling: Right-arm fast

International information
- National side: United Arab Emirates
- T20I debut (cap 13): 12 July 2018 v Thailand
- Last T20I: 27 February 2019 v Thailand
- Source: Cricinfo, 20 September 2020

Namita D'souza (born 26 April 2003) is an Indian-born cricketer who plays for the United Arab Emirates national cricket team. In July 2018, she was named in the United Arab Emirates' squad for the 2018 ICC Women's World Twenty20 Qualifier tournament. She made her Women's Twenty20 International (WT20I) against Thailand in the World Twenty20 Qualifier on 12 July 2018.
