= Hannah Rainey =

Scottish cricketer (born 1997)

Personal information
- Born: 2 June 1997 (age 29); Tower Hamlets, London, England
- Batting: Right-handed
- Bowling: Right-arm medium
- Role: Bowler

International information
- National side: Scotland
- ODI debut (cap 27): 17 October 2023 v Ireland
- Last ODI: 12 April 2024 v Papua New Guinea
- T20I debut (cap 10): 7 July 2018 v Uganda
- Last T20I: 7 May 2024 v Sri Lanka
- T20I shirt no.: 26

Domestic team information
- Years: Team
- 2022: Cumbria
- 2023–present: North West Thunder
- 2023: Oval Invincibles
- 2025–present: Yorkshire

Career statistics
Competition	WT20I	WT20I
Matches	4	37
Runs scored	12	12
Batting average	6.00	2.00
100s/50s	0/0	0/0
Top score	8*	5*
Balls bowled	158	492
Wickets	9	22
Bowling average	15.66	19.18
5 wickets in innings	1	0
10 wickets in match	0	0
Best bowling	5/41	3/15
Catches/stumpings	1/–	4/–
- Source: Cricinfo, 16 October 2023

Hannah Rainey (born 2 June 1997) is a Scottish cricketer who plays for Yorkshire. In July 2018, she was named in Scotland's squad for the 2018 ICC Women's World Twenty20 Qualifier tournament. She made her Women's Twenty20 International (WT20I) debut for Scotland against Uganda in the World Twenty20 Qualifier on 7 July 2018.

Rainey was elected as President of Edinburgh University Cricket Club in 2018. In May 2019, she was named in Scotland's squad for the 2019 ICC Women's Qualifier Europe tournament in Spain. In August 2019, she was named in Scotland's squad for the 2019 ICC Women's World Twenty20 Qualifier tournament in Scotland. In January 2022, she was named in Scotland's team for the 2022 Commonwealth Games Cricket Qualifier tournament in Malaysia.

Rainey appeared for Cumbria in the 2022 Women's Twenty20 Cup. In April 2023, it was announced that Rainey had joined North West Thunder for the upcoming season, although she did not play a match for the side in 2023. She was also signed by Oval Invincibles for The Hundred, but did not play a match. In March 2024, it was announced that she had signed a professional contract with North West Thunder.

In September 2024 she was named in the Scotland squad for the 2024 ICC Women's T20 World Cup.

Rainey was part of the Scotland squad for the 2025 Women's Cricket World Cup Qualifier in Pakistan in April 2025.

She has been selected as an injury replacement for Abtaha Maqsood for the 2026 Women's T20 World Cup.
