= Ishni Mananelage =

Sri Lankan-born Emirati cricketer (born 1988)

Personal information
- Full name: Ishni Senavirthna Mananelage
- Born: 11 August 1988 (age 38); Avissawella, Sri Lanka

International information
- National side: United Arab Emirates
- T20I debut (cap 14): 12 July 2018 v Thailand
- Last T20I: 19 January 2019 v Indonesia
- Source: Cricinfo, 20 September 2020

Ishni Mananelage (born 11 August 1988) is a Sri Lankan-born cricketer who plays for the United Arab Emirates national cricket team. In July 2018, she was named in the UAE squad for the 2018 ICC Women's World Twenty20 Qualifier tournament. She made her Women's Twenty20 International (WT20I) debut for the UAE against Thailand in the World Twenty20 Qualifier on 12 July 2018.
