= Judit Peter =

Indian-born Emirati cricketer (born 1987)

Personal information
- Full name: Judit Jose Peter
- Born: 1 November 1987 (age 39); Thiruvananthapuram, Kerala, India
- Batting: Right-handed
- Role: Wicket-keeper

International information
- National side: United Arab Emirates
- T20I debut (cap 8): 7 July 2018 v Netherlands
- Last T20I: 29 September 2023 v Namibia
- Source: ESPNcricinfo, 8 October 2024

Judit Peter (born 1 November 1987) is an Indian-born cricketer who plays for the United Arab Emirates national cricket team as a wicket-keeper. In July 2018, she was named in the UAE squad for the 2018 ICC Women's World Twenty20 Qualifier tournament. She made her Women's Twenty20 International (WT20I) debut against the Netherlands in the World Twenty20 Qualifier on 7 July 2018.
