= Veru Frank =

Papua New Guinean cricketer (born 1995)

Personal information
- Full name: Veru Frank
- Born: 12 April 1995 (age 31)
- Batting: Left-handed
- Bowling: Right-arm medium

International information
- National side: Papua New Guinea
- T20I debut (cap 3): 7 July 2018 v Bangladesh
- Last T20I: 7 September 2019 v Ireland
- Source: Cricinfo, 7 September 2019

Veru Frank (born 12 April 1995) is a Papua New Guinean cricketer. She played for the Papua New Guinea women's national cricket team in the 2017 Women's Cricket World Cup Qualifier in February 2017.

In June 2018, she was named in Papua New Guinea's squad for the 2018 ICC Women's World Twenty20 Qualifier tournament. She made her Women's Twenty20 International (WT20I) debut against Bangladesh in the World Twenty20 Qualifier on 7 July 2018.

In November 2018, she was named in the Women's Global Development Squad, to play fixtures against Women's Big Bash League (WBBL) clubs. In August 2019, she was named in the national squad for the 2019 ICC Women's World Twenty20 Qualifier tournament in Scotland.
