= Neha Sharma (cricketer) =

Indian-born Emirati cricketer (born 1988)

Personal information
- Born: 9 June 1988 (age 38); New Delhi, India
- Batting: Right-handed
- Bowling: Right-arm medium

International information
- National side: United Arab Emirates
- T20I debut (cap 12): 10 July 2018 v Bangladesh
- Last T20I: 27 February 2019 v Thailand
- Source: ESPNcricinfo, 27 February 2019

Neha Sharma (born 9 June 1988) is an Indian-born cricketer who plays for the United Arab Emirates national cricket team. In July 2018, she was named in the United Arab Emirates' squad for the 2018 ICC Women's World Twenty20 Qualifier tournament. She made her Women's Twenty20 International (WT20I) debut for the United Arab Emirates against Bangladesh in the World Twenty20 Qualifier on 10 July 2018.
