= Rita Musamali =

Ugandan cricketer (born 1999)

Personal information
- Full name: Rita Musamali
- Born: 21 May 1999 (age 27); Mbale, Uganda
- Batting: Right-handed
- Bowling: Right-arm medium

International information
- National side: Uganda
- T20I debut (cap 7): 7 July 2018 v Scotland
- Last T20I: 7 June 2024 v Cameroon

Career statistics
Competition	WT20I
Matches	87
Runs scored	1,041
Batting average	21.24
100s/50s	1/2
Top score	103*
Balls bowled	495
Wickets	21
Bowling average	22.38
5 wickets in innings	0
10 wickets in match	0
Best bowling	3/11
Catches/stumpings	26/0
- Source: Cricinfo, 7 October 2024

Rita Musamali (born 21 May 1999) is a Ugandan cricketer. In July 2018, she was named in Uganda's squad for the 2018 ICC Women's World Twenty20 Qualifier tournament. She made her Women's Twenty20 International (WT20I) debut for Uganda against Scotland in the World Twenty20 Qualifier on 7 July 2018.

In April 2019, she was named in Uganda's squad for the 2019 ICC Women's Qualifier Africa tournament in Zimbabwe. On 20 June 2019, in the Kwibuka Women's T20 Tournament match against Mali, Musamali scored 103 not out. She was the leading run-scorer in the tournament, with 189 runs in six matches.

In March 2023, Musamali became one of Uganda Cricket Association's first twelve women players to be awarded central contracts.

== See also ==
- List of centuries in women's Twenty20 International cricket
- Joyce Apio
- Concy Aweko
