= Naome Bagenda =

Ugandan cricketer (born 1990)

Naomi Bagenda
Personal information
- Full name: Naomi Kayondo Bagenda
- Born: 15 May 1990 (age 36)
- Batting: Right-handed

International information
- National side: Uganda
- T20I debut (cap 15): 6 April 2019 v Kenya
- Last T20I: 25 April 2022 v Namibia
- Source: Cricinfo, 25 April 2022

Naomi Kayondo Bagenda (born 15 May 1990) is a Ugandan cricketer, sports administrator and former skipper of the Uganda women's national cricket team. As a player, she was part of the Ugandan team that won the African Championship in August 2018 that was held in Namibia. She made her Women's Twenty20 International (WT20I) debut for Uganda against Kenya in the 2019 Victoria Tri-Series on 6 April 2019.

== Background and education ==
Naomi Kayondo was born in Kampala to Edward Kayondo, a doctor, on 15 May 1990. She is also the younger sister to Ugandan Cricketer Hamu Kayondo.

She attended Kings College, Budo and also pursued an MSc in Real Estate at Nottingham Trent University.

== Cricket career ==
Naomi Kayondo initially played cricket in her first year of high school before being selected to represent Uganda for the U-19 Uganda women's national cricket team while in her third year of high school

Domestically, she features for Soroti Challengers CC. As of January 2020, she was the assistant coach for the Uganda U-19 female cricket team In March 2023, Bagenda became one of the Uganda Cricket Association's first twelve women players to be awarded central contracts.
