= List of Papua New Guinea women Twenty20 International cricketers =

This is a list of Papua New Guinea women Twenty20 International cricketers. A Twenty20 International (T20I) is an international cricket match between two representative teams. A T20I is played under the rules of Twenty20 cricket. In April 2018, the International Cricket Council (ICC) granted full international status to Twenty20 women's matches played between member sides from 1 July 2018 onwards. The Papua New Guinea women's team made their Twenty20 International debut on 7 July 2018 against Bangladesh in Amstelveen during the 2018 ICC Women's World Twenty20 Qualifier.

The list is arranged in the order in which each player won her first Twenty20 cap. Where more than one player won their first Twenty20 cap in the same match, their surnames are listed alphabetically.

== Key ==
General

- ‡ – Captain
- † – Wicket-keeper
- First – Year of debut
- Last – Year of latest game
- Mat – Number of matches played

Batting

- Runs – Runs scored in career
- HS – Highest score
- Avg – Average runs scored per dismissal
- * – Batsman remained not out
- 50 – Half centuries scored
- 100 – Centuries scored

Bowling

- Balls – Balls bowled in career
- Wkt – Wickets taken in career
- BBI – Best bowling in an innings
- Ave – Average runs conceded per wicket

Fielding

- Ca – Catches taken
- St – Stumpings taken

== Players ==
Statistics are correct as of 17 November 2026.

General					Batting					Bowling				Fielding		Ref
No.	Name	First	Last	Mat	Runs	HS	Avg	50	100	Balls	Wkt	BBI	Ave	Ca	St	Ref
1	Vicky Araa	2018	2024	44	13	7	6.50	0	0	640	38	4/6	13.34	12	0	
2	Kaia Arua‡	2018	2024	47	341	43*	22.73	0	0	858	59	5/7	10.20	28	0	
3	Veru Frank	2018	2019	10	87	28*	17.40	0	0	42	0	–	–	1	0	
4	Sibona Jimmy	2018	2026	62	764	58*	14.69	1	0	1,051	52	4/13	15.82	13	0	
5	Kopi John	2018	2018	5	69	40	13.80	0	0	–	–	–	–	0	0	
6	Ravina Oa‡	2018	2023	36	62	16*	6.88	0	0	686	49	5/13	10.40	7	0	
7	Tanya Ruma	2018	2026	59	1,316	69*	31.33	7	0	–	–	–	–	12	0	
8	Pauke Siaka‡	2018	2026	63	591	43*	15.97	0	0	622	37	5/1	12.91	12	0	
9	Brenda Tau‡†	2018	2026	82	1,394	62*	25.81	5	0	–	–	–	–	27	29	
10	Mairi Tom	2018	2026	48	20	6	4.00	0	0	842	39	4/24	18.48	11	0	
11	Isabel Toua	2018	2026	63	123	25	7.68	0	0	1,072	56	4/5	14.45	11	0	
12	Naoani Vare	2018	2026	80	1,335	88*	24.27	6	0	84	5	3/17	18.40	19	0	
13	Natasha Ambo	2019	2019	16	3	3*	3.00	0	0	228	16	5/10	11.00	5	0	
14	Helen Buruka	2019	2019	4	–	–	–	–	–	–	–	–	–	0	0	
15	Helai Nou	2019	2019	12	16	8	5.33	0	0	–	–	–	–	1	0	
16	Henao Thomas	2019	2026	52	297	47	12.37	0	0	938	44	5/13	17.61	16	0	
17	Erani Pokana	2019	2026	14	44	17*	11.00	0	0	30	2	1/11	14.00	2	0	
18	Gari Buruka	2019	2019	4	0	0*	–	0	0	6	0	–	–	0	0	
19	Konio Oala	2019	2026	22	434	130*	22.84	1	1	84	3	2/15	26.66	3	0	
20	Nerela Ila	2019	2019	2	3	3*	–	–	–	–	–	–	–	0	0	
21	Hollan Doriga	2022	2026	42	413	63	14.24	1	0	244	17	5/2	12.00	8	0	
22	Geua Tom	2022	2026	40	32	9*	8.00	0	0	450	16	3/15	28.56	9	0	
23	Hane Tau	2022	2026	24	86	17*	10.75	0	0	428	14	4/25	28.07	1	0	
24	Vicky Buruka	2023	2026	10	3	2	1.50	0	0	174	14	4/23	9.92	4	0	
25	Kevau Frank	2023	2024	12	8	5	2.00	0	0	–	–	–	–	3	0	
26	Dika Lohia	2024	2026	23	31	16	7.75	0	0	252	15	2/2	14.66	5	0	
27	Mahuta Jayphert	2024	2024	2	1	1	1.00	0	0	12	0	–	–	0	0	
28	Lakshmi Rajadurai	2025	2026	7	28	13	5.60	0	0	–	–	–	–	1	0	
29	Miria Raio	2025	2025	8	20	17*	4.00	0	0	–	–	–	–	1	0	
30	Melanie Ani	2025	2025	7	30	19	10.00	0	0	–	–	–	–	1	0	
31	Brenda Elly	2025	2025	1	0	0	0.00	0	0	–	–	–	–	0	0	
32	Kevau Gabe	2026	2026	1	0	0*	–	0	0	18	0	–	–	0	0	

Note: The following match includes one or more missing catchers in the Cricinfo scorecard and hence statistics (as of 31 December 2019):

- vs. Samoa (9 July 2019); 1 missing catch
