= Pauke Siaka =

Papua New Guinean cricketer (born 1986)

Personal information
- Full name: Pauke Siaka
- Born: 19 June 1986 (age 40)
- Batting: Right-handed
- Bowling: Right-arm medium
- Relatives: Assad Vala (husband)

International information
- National side: Papua New Guinea
- ODI debut (cap 6): 24 March 2024 v Zimbabwe
- Last ODI: 11 August 2024 v Scotland
- T20I debut (cap 8): 7 July 2018 v Bangladesh
- Last T20I: 26 November 2025 v Scotland
- Source: ESPNcricinfo, 26 November 2025

Pauke Siaka (born 19 June 1986) is a Papua New Guinean cricketer. She captained the Papua New Guinea women's national cricket team in the 2017 Women's Cricket World Cup Qualifier in February 2017. In the tournament, she was the highest wicket-taker for Papua New Guinea, with 8 dismissals.

In June 2018, at the Papua New Guinea Cricket Awards, she won the Lewas Medal for the best Women's Cricketer of the Year for her performance in the Women's Cricket World Cup Qualifier. Later the same month, she was named as the captain of Papua New Guinea for the 2018 ICC Women's World Twenty20 Qualifier tournament. She made her Women's Twenty20 International (WT20I) debut against Bangladesh in the World Twenty20 Qualifier on 7 July 2018. In October 2021, she was named in Papua New Guinea's team for the 2021 Women's Cricket World Cup Qualifier tournament in Zimbabwe.

== Personal ==
Siaka is married to Papua New Guinean men's national cricket team captain Assad Vala.
