= Ravina Oa =

Papua New Guinean cricketer

Personal information
- Full name: Ravina Oa
- Born: 24 April 1995 (age 31)
- Batting: Right-handed
- Bowling: Right-arm medium

International information
- National side: Papua New Guinea
- T20I debut (cap 6): 7 July 2018 v Bangladesh
- Last T20I: 18 March 2023 v Vanuatu
Medal record
Representing Papua New Guinea
Women's Cricket
Pacific Games
Silver medal – second place	2019 Apia	Twenty20 International
- Source: Cricinfo, 8 October 2024

Ravina Oa (born 24 April 1995) is a Papua New Guinean cricketer. She played for the Papua New Guinea women's national cricket team in the 2017 Women's Cricket World Cup Qualifier in February 2017.

In June 2018, she was named in Papua New Guinea's squad for the 2018 ICC Women's World Twenty20 Qualifier tournament. She made her Women's Twenty20 International (WT20I) debut against Bangladesh in the World Twenty20 Qualifier on 7 July 2018. The same month, she was named in the ICC Women's Global Development Squad.

In November 2018, she was named in the Women's Global Development Squad, to play fixtures against Women's Big Bash League (WBBL) clubs. In April 2019, she was named in Papua New Guinea's squad for the 2019 ICC Women's Qualifier EAP tournament in Vanuatu. In the opening match of the tournament, against hosts Vanuatu, she took her first five-wicket haul in WT20Is.

In August 2019, she was named as the vice-captain of Papua New Guinea's squad for the 2019 ICC Women's World Twenty20 Qualifier tournament in Scotland. In October 2021, she was named in Papua New Guinea's team for the 2021 Women's Cricket World Cup Qualifier tournament in Zimbabwe.
