= Peter de Souza =

Indian-born Ugandan cricketer

Personal information
- Full name: Peter de Souza
- Born: Not known Karachi, Bombay, British India
- Batting: Unknown
- Bowling: Leg break googly

Career statistics
Competition	First-class
Matches	1
Runs scored	31
Batting average	31.00
100s/50s	–/–
Top score	16
Balls bowled	60
Wickets	0
Bowling average	–
5 wickets in innings	–
10 wickets in match	–
Best bowling	–
Catches/stumpings	–/–
- Source: Cricinfo, 31 January 2022

Peter de Souza (date of birth not known) is an Indian-born Ugandan former first-class cricketer.

Peter de Souza was born in Karachi of British India, where he learnt his cricket, before emigrating to the Uganda Protectorate from Pakistan circa 1958. He played his club cricket amongst other Indian-descended diaspora, playing for Jai Sports Club. He made a single appearance in first-class cricket for an East African Invitation XI against the touring Marylebone Cricket Club at Kampala in November 1963. Batting twice in the match from the lower order, he was dismissed for 16 runs by Jeff Jones, while in their second innings he was promoted to the middle order and scored 15 unbeaten runs. He played minor matches for Uganda from 1959 to 1964.
