= 2018 Women's World Twenty20 Qualifier =

Cricket tournament

- Dates: 7 – 14 July 2018
- Administrator: International Cricket Council
- Cricket format: WT20I
- Tournament format(s): Group stages, playoffs
- Host: Netherlands
- Champions: Bangladesh (1st title)
- Runners-up: Ireland
- Participants: 8
- Matches: 20
- Player of the series: (Ireland) Clare Shillington
- Most runs: (Netherlands) Sterre Kalis (231)
- Most wickets: (Ireland) Lucy O'Reilly (11)
- Official website: Official website

The 2018 ICC Women's World Twenty20 Qualifier was an international women's cricket tournament held from 7 to 14 July 2018 in the Netherlands. It was the third edition of the Women's World Twenty20 Qualifier and was the qualification tournament for the 2018 ICC Women's World Twenty20 tournament. The top two teams from the qualifier tournament, the champions Bangladesh and the runners-up Ireland, progressed to the 2018 ICC Women's World Twenty20 in the West Indies.

In April 2018, the International Cricket Council (ICC) granted full international status to Twenty20 women's matches played between member sides from 1 July 2018 onwards. Therefore, all the matches in the qualifier tournament are played as Women's Twenty20 Internationals (WT20Is).

Ahead of the final round of group-stage matches, all eight teams still had a chance to qualify for the final of the tournament, and therefore secure a place in the 2018 ICC Women's World Twenty20. After the conclusion of the last group-stage matches, Bangladesh and Papua New Guinea from Group A, along with Ireland and Scotland from Group B, had all progressed to the semi-finals. The other four teams, Netherlands, Thailand, Uganda and United Arab Emirates all progressed to the semi-final playoff matches, to determine their final ranking placements.

In the first semi final, Ireland beat Papua New Guinea by 27 runs, therefore advancing to the final of the tournament and qualifying for the 2018 ICC Women's World Twenty20 in the process. In the second semi final, Bangladesh beat Scotland by 49 runs, to also qualify for the tournament final and the 2018 ICC Women's World Twenty20. Bangladesh won the tournament, beating Ireland by 25 runs in the final. Ireland's Clare Shillington was named the player of the tournament.

== Qualification ==
The following teams qualified for the tournament:

Team	Qualification
Bangladesh	2016 World T20
Ireland	2016 World T20
Papua New Guinea	East Asia Pacific
Scotland	European/Americas
Netherlands (host)	European/Americas
Uganda	Africa
Thailand	Asia
United Arab Emirates	Asia

== Squads ==
All the squads and match officials were confirmed by the ICC in June 2018.

Bangladesh	Ireland	Netherlands	Papua New Guinea
Salma Khatun (c); Rumana Ahmed; Nahida Akter; Jahanara Alam; Lily Rani Biswas; Panna Ghosh; Fargana Hoque; Sanjida Islam; Fahima Khatun; Khadija Tul Kubra; Ayasha Rahman; Nigar Sultana; Shamima Sultana (wk); Sharmin Sultana	Laura Delany (c); Kim Garth; Cecelia Joyce; Isobel Joyce; Shauna Kavanagh; Gaby Lewis; Lara Maritz; Ciara Metcalfe; Cara Murray; Lucy O'Reilly; Eimear Richardson; Clare Shillington; Rebecca Stokell; Mary Waldron (wk)	Heather Siegers (c); Esther Corder; Caroline de Fouw; Denise Hannema; Sterre Kalis; Lisa Klokgieters; Mariska Kornet; Babette de Leede (wk); Juliët Post; Robine Rijke; Silver Siegers; Cher van Slobbe; Annemijn Thomson; Jolien van Vliet	Pauke Siaka (c); Natasha Ambo; Vicky Araa; Kaia Arua; Helen Buruka (wk); Veru Frank; Sibona Jimmy; Kopi John; Ravina Oa; Tanya Ruma; Brenda Tau (wk); Mairi Tom; Isabel Toua; Naoani Vare
Scotland	Thailand	Uganda	United Arab Emirates
Kathryn Bryce (c); Abbi Aitken; Sarah Bryce (wk); Priyanaz Chatterji; Becky Glen; Laura Grant; Rachel Hawkins; Lorna Jack (wk); Abtaha Maqsood; Katie McGill; Jess Mills; Hannah Rainey; Ellen Watson (wk); Ruth Willis	Sornnarin Tippoch (c); Nattaya Boochatham; Naruemol Chaiwai; Natthakan Chantam; Onnicha Kamchomphu; Rosenan Kanoh; Nannapat Koncharoenkai; Suleeporn Laomi; Wongpaka Liengprasert; Ratanaporn Padunglerd; Sirintra Saengsakaorat; Sainammin Saenya; Chanida Sutthiruang; Arriya Yenyueak	Kevin Awino (c, wk); Joyce Apio; Concy Aweko; Gertrude Candiru; Saidati Kemigisha; Janet Mbabazi; Rita Musamali; Franklin Najjumba; Immaculate Nakisuuyi; Prico Nakitende; Stephani Nampiina; Carol Namugenyi; Mary Nalule; Racheal Ntono	Humaira Tasneem (c); Nisha Ali; Judit Cleetus (wk); Namita D'souza; Udeni Dona; Heena Hotchandani; Kavisha Egodage; Ishni Mananelage; Chaya Mughal; Roopa Nagraj; Esha Oza; Neha Sharma; Chamani Seneviratne; Subha Srinivasan

Bangladesh also named Jannatul Ferdus, Lata Mondal, Murshida Khatun and Suraiya Azmin as players on standby for the series.

== Fixtures ==
On 23 May 2018, the ICC confirmed all the fixtures for the qualifier tournament.

=== Group A ===
Pos	Team	Pld	W	L	T	NR	Pts	NRR
1	Bangladesh	3	3	0	0	0	6	3.013
2	Papua New Guinea	3	2	1	0	0	4	0.332
3	United Arab Emirates	3	1	2	0	0	2	−1.235
4	Netherlands	3	0	3	0	0	0	−2.147

7 July 2018
16:00 (D/N)
Scorecard

Netherlands; 137/3 (20 overs)	v	United Arab Emirates; 138/4 (19.4 overs)
Sterre Kalis 88* (68); Heena Hotchandani 2/17 (4 overs)		Nisha Ali 69 (59); Caroline de Fouw 3/31 (3.4 overs)

United Arab Emirates Women won by 6 wickets
Kampong Cricket Club, Utrecht
Umpires: Ahmed Shah Pakteen (Afg) and Jacqueline Williams (WI)
Player of the match: Nisha Ali (UAE)

- Netherlands Women won the toss and elected to bat.
- Heather Siegers, Babette de Leede, Cher van Slobbe, Esther Corder, Robine Rijke, Lisa Klokgieters, Sterre Kalis, Jolien van Vliet (Ned), Humaira Tasneem, Chaya Mughal, Esha Oza, Heena Hotchandani, Judit Cleetus, Kavisha Egodage, Nisha Ali, Roopa Nagraj, Subha Srinivasan and Udeni Dona (UAE) all made their WT20I debuts.
- Chamani Seneviratne made her WT20I debut for the UAE, after previously representing Sri Lanka.

7 July 2018
16:00 (D/N)
Scorecard

Papua New Guinea; 84/6 (20 overs)	v	Bangladesh; 86/2 (14.5 overs)
Veru Frank 27 (26); Panna Ghosh 2/15 (4 overs)		Shamima Sultana 35 (36); Vicky Araa 1/13 (3 overs); Pauke Siaka 1/13 (3 overs)

Bangladesh Women won by 8 wickets
VRA Cricket Ground, Amstelveen
Umpires: Pim van Liemt (Ned) and Claire Polosak (Aus)
Player of the match: Shamima Sultana (Ban)

- Bangladesh Women won the toss and elected to field.
- Sibona Jimmy, Kopi John, Brenda Tau, Pauke Siaka, Tanya Ruma, Kaia Arua, Veru Frank, Isabel Toua, Ravina Oa, Vicky Araa and Mairi Tom (PNG) all made their WT20I debuts.

8 July 2018
16:00 (D/N)
Scorecard

Netherlands; 42 (18 overs)	v	Bangladesh; 44/3 (7.5 overs)
Sterre Kalis 15 (40); Rumana Ahmed 3/2 (3 overs)		Shamima Sultana 14 (12); Cher van Slobbe 2/4 (2 overs)

Bangladesh Women won by 7 wickets
Kampong Cricket Club, Utrecht
Umpires: Roland Black (Ire) and Claire Polosak (Aus)
Player of the match: Fahima Khatun (Ban)

- Bangladesh Women won the toss and elected to field.
- Silver Siegers (Ned) made her WT20I debut.

8 July 2018
16:00 (D/N)
Scorecard

United Arab Emirates; 83 (20 overs)	v	Papua New Guinea; 84/8 (19.5 overs)
Subha Srinivasan 22 (26); Sibona Jimmy 2/11 (3 overs)		Brenda Tau 19 (25); Subha Srinivasan 3/13 (4 overs)

Papua New Guinea Women won by 2 wickets
VRA Cricket Ground, Amstelveen
Umpires: Sue Redfern (Eng) and Jacqueline Williams (WI)
Player of the match: Brenda Tau (PNG)

- United Arab Emirates Women won the toss and elected to bat.
- Naoani Vare (PNG) made her WT20I debut.

10 July 2018
16:00 (D/N)
Scorecard

United Arab Emirates; 39 (16.2 overs)	v	Bangladesh; 40/2 (6.5 overs)
Esha Oza 18 (35); Fahima Khatun 4/8 (4 overs)		Nigar Sultana 21* (22); Nisha Ali 1/7 (0.5 overs)

Bangladesh Women won by 8 wickets
Kampong Cricket Club, Utrecht
Umpires: Roland Black (Ire) and Pim van Liemt (Ned)
Player of the match: Fahima Khatun (Ban)

- Bangladesh Women won the toss and elected to field.
- Neha Sharma (UAE) made her WT20I debut.
- Fahima Khatun (Ban) took her first hat-trick in WT20Is.

10 July 2018
16:00 (D/N)
Scorecard

Papua New Guinea; 129/5 (20 overs)	v	Netherlands; 85 (16.4 overs)
Kopi John 40 (47); Cher van Slobbe 1/12 (3 overs)		Denise Hannema 35 (36); Mairi Tom 4/24 (4 overs)

Papua New Guinea Women won by 44 runs
VRA Cricket Ground, Amstelveen
Umpires: Ahmed Shah Pakteen (Afg) and Sue Redfern (Eng)
Player of the match: Mairi Tom (PNG)

- Netherlands Women won the toss and elected to field.

=== Group B ===
Pos	Team	Pld	W	L	T	NR	Pts	NRR
1	Ireland	3	3	0	0	0	6	1.669
2	Scotland	3	2	1	0	0	4	1.359
3	Uganda	3	1	2	0	0	2	−1.699
4	Thailand	3	0	3	0	0	0	−0.917

7 July 2018
12:00
Scorecard

Thailand; 92/7 (20 overs)	v	Ireland; 93/3 (16.2 overs)
Nattaya Boochatham 41 (50); Lucy O'Reilly 3/23 (4 overs)		Clare Shillington 38 (32); Sornnarin Tippoch 3/12 (4 overs)

Ireland Women won by 7 wickets
Kampong Cricket Club, Utrecht
Umpires: Sue Redfern (Eng) and Jacqueline Williams (WI)
Player of the match: Clare Shillington (Ire)

- Ireland Women won the toss and elected to field.

7 July 2018
12:00
Scorecard

Uganda; 43 (15.3 overs)	v	Scotland; 47/1 (6.5 overs)
Kevin Awino 13 (21); Rachel Hawkins 3/3 (3 overs)		Sarah Bryce 36* (23); Joyce Apio 1/7 (1 over)

Scotland Women won by 9 wickets
VRA Cricket Ground, Amstelveen
Umpires: Roland Black (Ire) and Claire Polosak (Aus)
Player of the match: Rachel Hawkins (Sco)

- Scotland Women won the toss and elected to field.
- Lorna Jack, Sarah Bryce, Kathryn Bryce, Rachel Hawkins, Becky Glen, Priyanaz Chatterji, Katie McGill, Abbi Aitken, Laura Grant, Abtaha Maqsood, Hannah Rainey (Sco), Racheal Ntono, Saidati Kemigisha, Janet Mbabazi, Gertrude Candiru, Franklin Najjumba, Kevin Awino, Joyce Apio, Carol Namugenyi, Immaculate Nakisuuyi, Rita Musamali, Concy Aweko (Uga) all made their WT20I debuts.

8 July 2018
12:00
Scorecard

Thailand; 67/9 (20 overs)	v	Uganda; 68/6 (18.1 overs)
Nannapat Koncharoenkai 22 (37); Immaculate Nakisuuyi 2/8 (2 overs)		Immaculate Nakisuuyi 21 (21); Suleeporn Laomi 3/17 (4 overs)

Uganda Women won by 4 wickets
Kampong Cricket Club, Utrecht
Umpires: Roland Black (Ire) and Ahmed Shah Pakteen (Afg)
Player of the match: Immaculate Nakisuuyi (Uga)

- Uganda Women won the toss and elected to field.
- Mary Nalule and Stephanie Nampiina (Uga) both made their WT20I debuts.

8 July 2018
12:00
Scorecard

Scotland; 98/2 (20 overs)	v	Ireland; 99/1 (15.4 overs)
Sarah Bryce 49* (55); Laura Delany 1/13 (4 overs)		Clare Shillington 47 (39); Kathryn Bryce 1/24 (4 overs)

Ireland Women won by 9 wickets
VRA Cricket Ground, Amstelveen
Umpires: Pim van Liemt (Ned) and Sue Redfern (Eng)
Player of the match: Clare Shillington (Ire)

- Ireland Women won the toss and elected to field.

10 July 2018
12:00
Scorecard

Scotland; 97/6 (20 overs)	v	Thailand; 70 (17.2 overs)
Kathryn Bryce 39* (42); Nattaya Boochatham 3/16 (4 overs)		Nannapat Koncharoenkai 22 (34); Rachel Hawkins 4/10 (4 overs)

Scotland Women won by 27 runs
Kampong Cricket Club, Utrecht
Umpires: Pim van Liemt (Ned) and Claire Polosak (Aus)
Player of the match: Kathryn Bryce (Sco)

- Scotland Women won the toss and elected to bat.
- Ruth Willis (Sco) made her WT20I debut.

10 July 2018
12:00
Scorecard

Uganda; 78/8 (20 overs)	v	Ireland; 79/2 (12.1 overs)
Stephanie Nampiina 16 (22); Ciara Metcalfe 3/8 (4 overs)		Clare Shillington 27 (21); Rita Musamali 1/12 (2 overs)

Ireland Women won by 8 wickets
VRA Cricket Ground, Amstelveen
Umpires: Ahmed Shah Pakteen (Afg) and Jacqueline Williams (WI)
Player of the match: Ciara Metcalfe (Ire)

- Ireland Women won the toss and elected to field.
- Prico Nakitende (Uga) made her WT20I debut.
- Ciara Metcalfe (Ire) took her 100th wicket for Ireland.

== Semi-finals ==
Semi-final 1
12 July 2018
12:00
Scorecard

Ireland; 113/6 (20 overs)	v	Papua New Guinea; 86 (19.2 overs)
Gaby Lewis 36 (33); Vicky Araa 2/23 (4 overs)		Brenda Tau 22 (39); Lucy O'Reilly 3/13 (3.2 overs)

Ireland Women won by 27 runs
VRA Cricket Ground, Amstelveen
Umpires: Claire Polosak (Aus) and Jacqueline Williams (WI)
Player of the match: Lucy O'Reilly (Ire)

- Papua New Guinea Women won the toss and elected to field.
- Kaia Arua captained Papua New Guinea.

Play-off semi-final 1
12 July 2018
12:00
Scorecard

Netherlands; 118/3 (20 overs)	v	Uganda; 119/4 (18.3 overs)
Sterre Kalis 46 (43); Immaculate Nakisuuyi 1/13 (3 overs)		Gertrude Candiru 43* (42); Cher van Slobbe 1/24 (3 overs)

Uganda Women won by 6 wickets
Kampong Cricket Club, Utrecht
Umpires: Roland Black (Ire) and Ahmed Shah Pakteen (Afg)
Player of the match: Gertrude Candiru (Uga)

- Netherlands Women won the toss and elected to bat.

Semi-final 2
12 July 2018
16:00 (D/N)
Scorecard

Bangladesh; 125/6 (20 overs)	v	Scotland; 76/7 (20 overs)
Nigar Sultana 31* (36); Priyanaz Chatterji 2/17 (4 overs)		Sarah Bryce 31 (44); Rumana Ahmed 2/10 (4 overs)

Bangladesh Women won by 49 runs
VRA Cricket Ground, Amstelveen
Umpires: Claire Polosak (Aus) and Sue Redfern (Eng)
Player of the match: Rumana Ahmed (Ban)

- Scotland Women won the toss and elected to field.

Play-off semi-final 2
12 July 2018
16:00 (D/N)
Scorecard

United Arab Emirates; 50 (18.1 overs)	v	Thailand; 51/3 (15.3 overs)
Esha Oza 15 (25); Chanida Sutthiruang 2/7 (3 overs)		Naruemol Chaiwai 14 (29); Subha Srinivasan 2/15 (4 overs)

Thailand Women won by 7 wickets
Kampong Cricket Club, Utrecht
Umpires: Roland Black (Ire) and Pim van Liemt (Ned)
Player of the match: Chanida Sutthiruang (Tha)

- United Arab Emirates Women won the toss and elected to bat.
- Ishni Mananelage and Namita D'souza (UAE) both made their WT20I debuts.

== Play-off matches ==
7th place play-off
14 July 2018
10:00
Scorecard

Netherlands; 146/3 (20 overs)	v	United Arab Emirates; 146/9 (20 overs)
Sterre Kalis 79 (65); Nisha Ali 1/20 (3 overs)		Nisha Ali 37 (28); Lisa Klokgieters 3/34 (4 overs)

Match tied
(United Arab Emirates Women won the Super Over)
VRA Cricket Ground, Amstelveen
Umpires: Roland Black (Ire) and Ahmed Shah Pakteen (Afg)
Player of the match: Sterre Kalis (Ned)

- United Arab Emirates Women won the toss and elected to field.
- Juliët Post (Ned) made her WT20I debut.

5th place play-off
14 July 2018
14:00
Scorecard

Thailand; 113/7 (20 overs)	v	Uganda; 79/8 (20 overs)
Natthakan Chantam 44 (41); Immaculate Nakisuuyi 1/15 (3 overs)		Stephani Nampiina 28* (29); Chanida Sutthiruang 2/7 (4 overs)

Thailand Women won by 34 runs
VRA Cricket Ground, Amstelveen
Umpires: Roland Black (Ire) and Pim van Liemt (Ned)
Player of the match: Nattaya Boochatham (Tha)

- Uganda Women won the toss and elected to field.

3rd place play-off
14 July 2018
12:00
Scorecard

Papua New Guinea; 101/6 (20 overs)	v	Scotland; 102/0 (17 overs)
Veru Frank 28* (28); Hannah Rainey 2/22 (4 overs)		Kathryn Bryce 51* (57)

Scotland Women won by 10 wickets
Kampong Cricket Club, Utrecht
Umpires: Claire Polosak (Aus) and Jacqueline Williams (WI)
Player of the match: Kathryn Bryce (Sco)

- Scotland Women won the toss and elected to field.

Final
14 July 2018
16:00 (D/N)
Scorecard

Bangladesh; 122/9 (20 overs)	v	Ireland; 95 (18.4 overs)
Ayasha Rahman 46 (42); Lucy O'Reilly 4/28 (4 overs)		Gaby Lewis 26 (30); Panna Ghosh 5/16 (4 overs)

Bangladesh Women won by 25 runs
Kampong Cricket Club, Utrecht
Umpires: Claire Polosak (Aus) and Sue Redfern (Eng)
Player of the match: Panna Ghosh (Ban)

- Ireland Women won the toss and elected to field.
- Panna Ghosh (Ban) took her first five-wicket haul in WT20Is.

== Final standings ==
Position	Team
1st	Bangladesh
2nd	Ireland
3rd	Scotland
4th	Papua New Guinea
5th	Thailand
6th	Uganda
7th	United Arab Emirates
8th	Netherlands

Qualified for the 2018 World Twenty20.
