= Immaculate Nakisuuyi =

Ugandan cricketer (born 1996)

Personal information
- Full name: Immaculate Nakisuuyi
- Born: 7 December 1997 (age 28); Jinja, Uganda
- Batting: Right-handed
- Bowling: Right-arm medium

International information
- National side: Uganda
- T20I debut (cap 9): 7 July 2018 v Scotland
- Last T20I: 7 June 2024 v Cameroon

Career statistics
Competition	WT20I
Matches	69
Runs scored	950
Batting average	22.99
100s/50s	0/2
Top score	68*
Balls bowled	619
Wickets	38
Bowling average	13.94
5 wickets in innings	0
10 wickets in match	0
Best bowling	4/15
Catches/stumpings	17/0
- Source: Cricinfo, 7 October 2024

Immaculate Nakisuuyi (born 7 December 1997) is a Ugandan cricketer. In July 2018, she was named in Uganda's squad for the 2018 ICC Women's World Twenty20 Qualifier tournament. She made her Women's Twenty20 International (WT20I) debut for Uganda against Scotland in the World Twenty20 Qualifier on 7 July 2018. She was the joint-leading wicket-taker for Uganda in the tournament, with four dismissals in five matches.

In April 2019, she was named in Uganda's squad for the 2019 ICC Women's Qualifier Africa tournament in Zimbabwe.
