= Joyce Apio =

Ugandan cricketer (born 1996)

Personal information
- Full name: Joyce Mary Apio
- Born: 29 July 1996 (age 30)
- Batting: Right-handed
- Bowling: Right-arm medium

International information
- National side: Uganda
- T20I debut (cap 1): 7 July 2018 v Scotland
- Last T20I: 23 June 2019 v Mali
- Source: Cricinfo, 23 June 2019

Joyce Mary Apio (born 29 July 1996) is a Ugandan cricketer. In July 2018, she was named in Uganda's squad for the 2018 ICC Women's World Twenty20 Qualifier tournament. She made her Women's Twenty20 International (WT20I) debut against Scotland in the World Twenty20 Qualifier on 7 July 2018.

In April 2019, she was named in Uganda's squad for the 2019 ICC Women's Qualifier Africa tournament in Zimbabwe. In June 2019, she was the leading wicket-taker in the 2019 Kwibuka Women's T20 Tournament, with ten dismissals in six matches.

== See also ==
- Kevin Awino
- Uganda national women's cricket team
- Women's cricket in Uganda
- ICC Women's World Twenty20 Qualifier
