= Kevin Awino =

Ugandan cricketer (born 1997)

Himanshu kandpal
Personal information
- Full name: Kevin Awino
- Born: 6 June 1997 (age 29); Jinja, Uganda
- Batting: Right-handed
- Bowling: Right-arm medium
- Role: Wicket-keeper

International information
- National side: Uganda
- T20I debut (cap 3): 7 July 2018 v Scotland
- Last T20I: 5 June 2024 v Rwanda

Career statistics
Competition	WT20I
Matches	75
Runs scored	780
Batting average	17.72
100s/50s	0/3
Top score	95*
Balls bowled	–
Wickets	–
Bowling average	–
5 wickets in innings	–
10 wickets in match	–
Best bowling	–
Catches/stumpings	31/18
- Source: ESPNCricinfo, 7 October 2024

Kevin Awino (born 6 June 1996) is a Uganda women's cricketer. Kevin Awino is a leading figure in Ugandan women's cricket and plays as wicket-keeper and has previously been the captain of the National team. In July 2018, she was named in Uganda's squad for the 2018 ICC Women's World Twenty20 Qualifier tournament. It was in that tournament that she made her Women's Twenty20 International (WT20I) debut for Uganda against Scotland, on 7 July 2018. She was selected as the captain for the squad. In April 2019, she was named as the captain of Uganda's squad for the 2019 ICC Women's Qualifier Africa tournament in Zimbabwe. Based on her career statistics in Women's Twenty20 Internationals (WT20I), Kevin Awino has recorded notable achievements.

In March 2023, Awino became one of the Uganda Cricket Association's first twelve women players to be awarded central contracts.

== See also ==
- Joyce Apio
- Uganda national women's cricket team
- Women's cricket in Uganda
- ICC Women's World Twenty20 Qualifier
