= Concy Aweko =

Ugandan cricketer

Personal information
- Full name: Consylate Aweko Numungu
- Born: 23 May 1991 (age 35)
- Batting: Right-handed
- Bowling: Right-arm medium

International information
- National side: Uganda
- T20I debut (cap 2): 7 July 2018 v Scotland
- Last T20I: 26 November 2025 v Tanzania

Career statistics
| Competition | WT20I |
|---|---|
| Matches | 81 |
| Runs scored | 146 |
| Batting average | 6.63 |
| 100s/50s | 0/0 |
| Top score | 22* |
| Balls bowled | 1,826 |
| Wickets | 109 |
| Bowling average | 10.9035 |
| 5 wickets in innings | 0 |
| 10 wickets in match | 0 |
| Best bowling | 4/6 |
| Catches/stumpings | 21/0 |
- Source: Cricinfo, 7 October 2024

Concy Aweko (born 23 May 1991) is a Ugandan cricketer. In July 2018, she was named in Uganda's squad for the 2018 ICC Women's World Twenty20 Qualifier tournament. She made her Women's Twenty20 International (WT20I) debut for Uganda against Scotland in the World Twenty20 Qualifier on 7 July 2018.

In April 2019, she was named in Uganda's squad for the 2019 ICC Women's Qualifier Africa tournament in Zimbabwe. On 8 May 2019, in the match against Kenya, she took four wickets in five balls, including her first hat-trick in WT20Is. She was the first cricketer for Uganda to take a hat-trick in a Women's Twenty20 International match.

In March 2023, as team captain, Aweko became one of the Uganda Cricket Association's first twelve women players to be awarded central contracts.
