= Associate international cricket in 2024 =

International cricket season

The 2024 Associate international cricket season included series starting from approximately April to September 2024. All official 20-over matches between associate members of the ICC were eligible to have full men's Twenty20 International or women's Twenty20 International (T20I) status, as the International Cricket Council (ICC) granted T20I status to matches between all of its members from 1 July 2018 (women's teams) and 1 January 2019 (men's teams). The season included all T20I cricket series mostly involving ICC Associate members, that are played in addition to series covered in International cricket in 2024.

== Season overview ==
Men's international tours
Start date	Home team	Away team	Results [Matches]
Start date	Home team	Away team	T20I
1 April 2024	Oman	Namibia	2–3 [5]
7 April 2024	United States	Canada	4–0 [5]
11 April 2024	Costa Rica	Mexico	2–3 [5]
14 April 2024	Spain	Jersey	2–0 [2]
1 May 2024	Indonesia	Thailand	2–3 [5]
7 May 2024	Japan	Mongolia	6–0 [7]
25 May 2024	Austria	Belgium	2–2 [4]
8 June 2024	Belgium	Guernsey	2–2 [4]
15 June 2024	Denmark	Jersey	0–2 [3]
17 June 2024	Cyprus	Estonia	2–4 [6]
22 June 2024	Guernsey	Jersey	1–2 [3]
29 June 2024	Slovenia	Serbia	2–1 [3]
12 July 2024	Kenya	Nigeria	3–2 [5]
2 August 2024	Croatia	Spain	0–5 [5]
Men's international tournaments
Start date	Tournament		Winners
12 April 2024	(Oman) 2024 ACC Men's Premier Cup		United Arab Emirates
9 May 2024	(France) 2024 Mdina Cup		Belgium
24 May 2024	(Romania) 2024 Continental Cup		Hungary
9 June 2024	(Italy) 2024 Men's T20 World Cup Europe Qualifier A		Italy
14 June 2024	(Finland) 2024 Men's Nordic Cup		Norway
28 June 2024	2024 Kenya Quadrangular Series		Kenya
7 July 2024	(Germany) 2024 Men's T20 World Cup Europe Qualifier B		Jersey
17 August 2024	(Samoa) 2024 Men's T20 World Cup EAP Qualifier A		Samoa
21 August 2024	2024 Malaysia Tri-Nation Series		Kuwait
21 August 2024	(Guernsey) 2024 Men's T20 World Cup Europe Qualifier C		Guernsey
23 August 2024	2024 Netherlands T20I Tri-Nation Series		Netherlands
30 August 2024	(Malaysia) 2024 Men's T20 World Cup Asia Qualifier A		Malaysia

Women's international tours
Start date	Home team	Away team	Results [Matches]
Start date	Home team	Away team	WT20I
20 April 2024	Gibraltar	Estonia	3–0 [3]
21 April 2024	Indonesia	Mongolia	6–0 [6]
4 May 2024	Austria	Denmark	2–1 [3]
5 May 2024	(England) Guernsey	Isle of Man	3–0 [3]
19 May 2024	Belgium	Luxembourg	0–4 [4]
28 May 2024	Netherlands	Italy	2–0 [4]
8 June 2024	Austria	Czech Republic	3–0 [3]
17 June 2024	Cyprus	Estonia	5–0 [6]
17 June 2024	Netherlands	Hong Kong	4–0 [4]
14 July 2024	Jersey	Guernsey	1–0 [1]
28 July 2024	Germany	Italy	0–1 [1]
17 August 2024	Malta	Isle of Man	0–3 [3]
10 September 2024	Kenya	Rwanda	1–4 [5]
14 September 2024	Serbia	Cyprus	0–2 [4]
20 September 2024	Greece	Spain	0–4 [5]
Start date	Tournament		Winners
16 April 2024	2024 United Arab Emirates Women's Quadrangular Series		—N/a
22 April 2024	(Botswana) 2024 Kalahari Women's Tournament		Rwanda
30 May 2024	(Rwanda) 2024 Kwibuka Women's T20 Tournament		Uganda
14 June 2024	(Czech Republic) 2024 Women's Central Europe Cup		Gibraltar
2 July 2024	(Indonesia) 2024 Bali Bash Women's Tri-Nation Series		Indonesia
26 July 2024	2024 Germany Women's Tri-Nation Series		Italy
10 August 2024	(Norway) 2024 Women's Nordic Cup		Denmark
14 August 2024	2024 Netherlands Women's T20I Tri-Nation Series		Scotland
21 August 2024	(Malta) 2024 Women's Valletta Cup		Isle of Man
6 September 2024	(Namibia) 2024 Capricorn Women's Tri-Nation Series		United Arab Emirates
14 September 2024	(Denmark) 2024 Copenhagen Cup		Denmark

== April ==
=== Namibia in Oman ===
T20I series
No.	Date	Home captain	Away captain	Venue	Result
T20I 2539	1 April	Zeeshan Maqsood	Gerhard Erasmus	Oman Cricket Academy Ground Turf 1, Al Amarat	Namibia by 4 wickets
T20I 2540	2 April	Zeeshan Maqsood	Gerhard Erasmus	Oman Cricket Academy Ground Turf 1, Al Amarat	Oman by 6 runs
T20I 2541	4 April	Aqib Ilyas	Gerhard Erasmus	Oman Cricket Academy Ground Turf 1, Al Amarat	Oman by 8 wickets
T20I 2542	5 April	Aqib Ilyas	Gerhard Erasmus	Oman Cricket Academy Ground Turf 1, Al Amarat	Namibia by 24 runs
T20I 2543	7 April	Zeeshan Maqsood	Gerhard Erasmus	Oman Cricket Academy Ground Turf 1, Al Amarat	Namibia by 62 runs

=== Canada in the United States ===
T20I series
No.	Date	Home captain	Away captain	Venue	Result
T20I 2544	7 April	Monank Patel	Saad Bin Zafar	Prairie View Cricket Complex, Houston	United States by 6 wickets
T20I 2545	9 April	Monank Patel	Saad Bin Zafar	Prairie View Cricket Complex, Houston	United States by 31 runs
T20I 2545a	10 April	Monank Patel	Saad Bin Zafar	Prairie View Cricket Complex, Houston	Match abandoned
T20I 2552	12 April	Monank Patel	Saad Bin Zafar	Prairie View Cricket Complex, Houston	United States by 14 runs
T20I 2559	13 April	Aaron Jones	Saad Bin Zafar	Prairie View Cricket Complex, Houston	United States by 4 wickets

=== Mexico in Costa Rica ===
2024 Central American Championship – T20I series
No.	Date	Home captain	Away captain	Venue	Result
T20I 2546	11 April	Sachin Ravikumar	Shantanu Kaveri	Los Reyes Polo Club, Guácima	Costa Rica by 8 wickets
T20I 2551	12 April	Sachin Ravikumar	Shantanu Kaveri	Los Reyes Polo Club, Guácima	Mexico by 22 runs
T20I 2553	12 April	Sachin Ravikumar	Shantanu Kaveri	Los Reyes Polo Club, Guácima	Mexico by 42 runs
T20I 2558	13 April	Sachin Ravikumar	Shantanu Kaveri	Los Reyes Polo Club, Guácima	Costa Rica by 42 runs
T20I 2564	14 April	Sachin Ravikumar	Shantanu Kaveri	Los Reyes Polo Club, Guácima	Mexico by 58 runs

=== 2024 ACC Men's Premier Cup ===
Pos	Team	Pld	W	L	T	NR	Pts	NRR
1	Nepal	4	4	0	0	0	8	1.557
2	Hong Kong	4	2	2	0	0	4	−0.128
3	Qatar	4	2	2	0	0	4	−0.453
4	Saudi Arabia	4	1	3	0	0	2	0.306
5	Malaysia	4	1	3	0	0	2	−0.918

Source: ESPNcricinfo

Pos	Team	Pld	W	L	T	NR	Pts	NRR
1	Oman	4	4	0	0	0	8	2.149
2	United Arab Emirates	4	3	1	0	0	6	2.772
3	Kuwait	4	2	2	0	0	4	0.569
4	Bahrain	4	1	3	0	0	2	−0.031
5	Cambodia	4	0	4	0	0	0	−5.903

Source: ESPNcricinfo

Round-robin
No.	Date	Team 1	Captain 1	Team 2	Captain 2	Venue	Result
T20I 2547	12 April	Oman	Zeeshan Maqsood	Bahrain	Haider Butt	Oman Cricket Academy Ground Turf 1, Al Amarat	Oman by 3 runs
T20I 2548	12 April	Kuwait	Mohammad Aslam	United Arab Emirates	Muhammad Waseem	Oman Cricket Academy Ground Turf 2, Al Amarat	United Arab Emirates by 7 wickets
T20I 2549	12 April	Malaysia	Virandeep Singh	Nepal	Rohit Paudel	Oman Cricket Academy Ground Turf 1, Al Amarat	Nepal by 5 wickets
T20I 2550	12 April	Hong Kong	Nizakat Khan	Qatar	Muhammad Tanveer	Oman Cricket Academy Ground Turf 2, Al Amarat	Hong Kong by 26 runs
T20I 2554	13 April	Cambodia	Luqman Butt	Kuwait	Mohammad Aslam	Oman Cricket Academy Ground Turf 1, Al Amarat	Kuwait by 8 wickets
T20I 2555	13 April	Bahrain	Haider Butt	United Arab Emirates	Muhammad Waseem	Oman Cricket Academy Ground Turf 2, Al Amarat	United Arab Emirates by 37 runs
T20I 2556	13 April	Nepal	Rohit Paudel	Qatar	Muhammad Tanveer	Oman Cricket Academy Ground Turf 1, Al Amarat	Nepal by 32 runs
T20I 2557	13 April	Malaysia	Virandeep Singh	Saudi Arabia	Hisham Sheikh	Oman Cricket Academy Ground Turf 2, Al Amarat	Malaysia by 12 runs
T20I 2560	14 April	Oman	Zeeshan Maqsood	Cambodia	Luqman Butt	Oman Cricket Academy Ground Turf 2, Al Amarat	Oman by 63 runs
T20I 2562	14 April	Hong Kong	Nizakat Khan	Saudi Arabia	Hisham Sheikh	Oman Cricket Academy Ground Turf 2, Al Amarat	Saudi Arabia by 55 runs
T20I 2565	15 April	Hong Kong	Nizakat Khan	Nepal	Rohit Paudel	Oman Cricket Academy Ground Turf 1, Al Amarat	Nepal by 8 wickets
T20I 2566	15 April	Malaysia	Virandeep Singh	Qatar	Muhammad Tanveer	Oman Cricket Academy Ground Turf 2, Al Amarat	Qatar by 4 wickets
T20I 2567	15 April	Oman	Zeeshan Maqsood	United Arab Emirates	Muhammad Waseem	Oman Cricket Academy Ground Turf 1, Al Amarat	Oman by 9 wickets
T20I 2568	15 April	Bahrain	Haider Butt	Kuwait	Mohammad Aslam	Oman Cricket Academy Ground Turf 2, Al Amarat	Kuwait by 26 runs
T20I 2569	16 April	Qatar	Muhammad Tanveer	Saudi Arabia	Hisham Sheikh	Oman Cricket Academy Ground Turf 1, Al Amarat	Qatar by 15 runs
T20I 2570	16 April	Bahrain	Haider Butt	Cambodia	Luqman Butt	Oman Cricket Academy Ground Turf 1, Al Amarat	Bahrain by 7 wickets
T20I 2571	17 April	Hong Kong	Nizakat Khan	Malaysia	Virandeep Singh	Oman Cricket Academy Ground Turf 1, Al Amarat	Hong Kong by 7 wickets
T20I 2572	17 April	Nepal	Rohit Paudel	Saudi Arabia	Hisham Sheikh	Oman Cricket Academy Ground Turf 2, Al Amarat	Nepal by 6 wickets
T20I 2573	17 April	Cambodia	Etienne Beukes	United Arab Emirates	Muhammad Waseem	Oman Cricket Academy Ground Turf 1, Al Amarat	United Arab Emirates by 9 wickets
T20I 2574	17 April	Oman	Zeeshan Maqsood	Kuwait	Mohammad Aslam	Oman Cricket Academy Ground Turf 2, Al Amarat	Oman by 46 runs
Play-offs
No.	Date	Team 1	Captain 1	Team 2	Captain 2	Venue	Result
T20I 2576	19 April	Nepal	Rohit Paudel	United Arab Emirates	Muhammad Waseem	Oman Cricket Academy Ground Turf 1, Al Amarat	United Arab Emirates by 6 wickets
T20I 2577	19 April	Oman	Zeeshan Maqsood	Hong Kong	Nizakat Khan	Oman Cricket Academy Ground Turf 1, Al Amarat	Oman by 5 wickets
T20I 2578	20 April	Hong Kong	Nizakat Khan	Nepal	Rohit Paudel	Oman Cricket Academy Ground Turf 1, Al Amarat	Hong Kong by 4 wickets
T20I 2580	21 April	Oman	Zeeshan Maqsood	United Arab Emirates	Muhammad Waseem	Oman Cricket Academy Ground Turf 1, Al Amarat	United Arab Emirates by 55 runs

=== Jersey in Spain ===
T20I series
No.	Date	Home captain	Away captain	Venue	Result
T20I 2561	14 April	Christian Munoz-Mills	Charles Perchard	La Manga Club, Cartagena	Spain by 5 wickets
T20I 2563	14 April	Christian Munoz-Mills	Charles Perchard	La Manga Club, Cartagena	Spain by 1 wicket

=== 2024 United Arab Emirates Women's Quadrangular Series ===
Pos	Team	Pld	W	L	NR	Pts	NRR
1	Netherlands	3	0	0	3	3	—
2	Scotland	3	0	0	3	3	—
3	United Arab Emirates	3	0	0	3	3	—
4	United States	3	0	0	3	3	—

Source: ESPNcricinfo

Round-robin
No.	Date	Team 1	Captain 1	Team 2	Captain 2	Venue	Result
WT20I 1821b	16 April	United Arab Emirates	Esha Oza	Netherlands	Heather Siegers	Sheikh Zayed Cricket Stadium, Abu Dhabi	Match abandoned
WT20I 1821c	16 April	Scotland	Kathryn Bryce	United States	Sindhu Sriharsha	Sheikh Zayed Cricket Stadium, Abu Dhabi	Match abandoned
WT20I 1821d	17 April	United Arab Emirates	Esha Oza	United States	Sindhu Sriharsha	Sheikh Zayed Cricket Stadium, Abu Dhabi	Match abandoned
WT20I 1821e	17 April	Netherlands	Heather Siegers	Scotland	Kathryn Bryce	Sheikh Zayed Cricket Stadium, Abu Dhabi	Match abandoned
WT20I 1822a	19 April	Netherlands	Heather Siegers	United States	Sindhu Sriharsha	Tolerance Oval, Abu Dhabi	Match abandoned
WT20I 1822b	19 April	United Arab Emirates	Esha Oza	Scotland	Kathryn Bryce	Tolerance Oval, Abu Dhabi	Match abandoned

=== Estonia women in Gibraltar ===
During the series, Gibraltar's Sally Barton became the oldest person to play international cricket.

WT20I series
No.	Date	Home captain	Away captain	Venue	Result
WT20I 1823	20 April	Amy Benatar	Maret Valner	Europa Sports Park, Gibraltar	Gibraltar by 100 runs
WT20I 1826	21 April	Amy Benatar	Maret Valner	Europa Sports Park, Gibraltar	Gibraltar by 128 runs
WT20I 1827	21 April	Amy Benatar	Maret Valner	Europa Sports Park, Gibraltar	Gibraltar by 88 runs

=== Mongolia women in Indonesia ===
During the 5th T20I, Indonesia's Rohmalia achieved the best bowling figures across men's and women's T20Is (7 wickets for 0 runs), which came on her debut match. All seven batters dismissed by her were for a duck.

WT20I series
No.	Date	Home captain	Away captain	Venue	Result
WT20I 1824	21 April	Ni Wayan Sariani	Tsendsuren Ariuntsetseg	Udayana Cricket Ground, Jimbaran	Indonesia by 122 runs
WT20I 1825	21 April	Ni Wayan Sariani	Tsendsuren Ariuntsetseg	Udayana Cricket Ground, Jimbaran	Indonesia by 104 runs
WT20I 1828	22 April	Ni Wayan Sariani	Tsendsuren Ariuntsetseg	Udayana Cricket Ground, Jimbaran	Indonesia by 10 wickets (DLS)
WT20I 1829	22 April	Ni Wayan Sariani	Tsendsuren Ariuntsetseg	Udayana Cricket Ground, Jimbaran	Indonesia by 120 runs
WT20I 1838	24 April	Ni Wayan Sariani	Tsendsuren Ariuntsetseg	Udayana Cricket Ground, Jimbaran	Indonesia by 127 runs
WT20I 1839	24 April	Ni Wayan Sariani	Tsendsuren Ariuntsetseg	Udayana Cricket Ground, Jimbaran	Indonesia by 10 wickets

=== 2024 Kalahari Women's Tournament ===
Pos	Team	Pld	W	L	NR	Pts	NRR
1	Rwanda	6	6	0	0	12	3.767
2	Botswana	6	4	2	0	8	2.004
3	Mozambique	6	2	4	0	4	−0.119
4	Lesotho	6	0	6	0	0	−5.581

Source: ESPNcricinfo

Round-robin
No.	Date	Team 1	Captain 1	Team 2	Captain 2	Venue	Result
WT20I 1830	22 April	Botswana	Laura Mophakedi	Lesotho	Maneo Nyabela	Botswana Cricket Association Oval 1, Gaborone	Botswana by 112 runs
WT20I 1831	22 April	Mozambique	Angelica Salomao	Rwanda	Flora Irakoze	Botswana Cricket Association Oval 2, Gaborone	Rwanda by 10 wickets
WT20I 1832	22 April	Lesotho	Maneo Nyabela	Rwanda	Flora Irakoze	Botswana Cricket Association Oval 1, Gaborone	Rwanda by 10 wickets
WT20I 1833	22 April	Botswana	Laura Mophakedi	Mozambique	Angelica Salomao	Botswana Cricket Association Oval 2, Gaborone	Botswana by 9 wickets
WT20I 1834	23 April	Botswana	Laura Mophakedi	Rwanda	Flora Irakoze	Botswana Cricket Association Oval 1, Gaborone	Rwanda by 7 wickets
WT20I 1835	23 April	Lesotho	Maneo Nyabela	Mozambique	Angelica Salomao	Botswana Cricket Association Oval 2, Gaborone	Mozambique by 124 runs
WT20I 1836	23 April	Botswana	Laura Mophakedi	Mozambique	Angelica Salomao	Botswana Cricket Association Oval 1, Gaborone	Botswana by 9 wickets
WT20I 1837	23 April	Lesotho	Maneo Nyabela	Rwanda	Flora Irakoze	Botswana Cricket Association Oval 2, Gaborone	Rwanda by 10 wickets
WT20I 1840	25 April	Mozambique	Angelica Salomao	Rwanda	Flora Irakoze	Botswana Cricket Association Oval 1, Gaborone	Rwanda by 7 wickets
WT20I 1841	25 April	Botswana	Laura Mophakedi	Lesotho	Maneo Nyabela	Botswana Cricket Association Oval 2, Gaborone	Botswana by 100 runs
WT20I 1844	25 April	Botswana	Laura Mophakedi	Rwanda	Flora Irakoze	Botswana Cricket Association Oval 1, Gaborone	Rwanda by 8 wickets
WT20I 1845	25 April	Lesotho	Maneo Nyabela	Mozambique	Angelica Salomao	Botswana Cricket Association Oval 2, Gaborone	Mozambique by 65 runs
Play-offs
WT20I 1848	26 April	Lesotho	Maneo Nyabela	Mozambique	Angelica Salomao	Botswana Cricket Association Oval 1, Gaborone	Mozambique by 44 runs
WT20I 1849	26 April	Botswana	Laura Mophakedi	Rwanda	Flora Irakoze	Botswana Cricket Association Oval 1, Gaborone	Rwanda by 8 wickets

== May ==
=== Thailand in Indonesia ===
T20I series
No.	Date	Home captain	Away captain	Venue	Result
T20I 2584	1 May	Kadek Gamantika	Austin Lazarus	Udayana Cricket Ground, Jimbaran	Thailand by 8 runs
T20I 2585	2 May	Kadek Gamantika	Austin Lazarus	Udayana Cricket Ground, Jimbaran	Indonesia by 6 wickets
T20I 2587	4 May	Kadek Gamantika	Austin Lazarus	Udayana Cricket Ground, Jimbaran	Indonesia by 33 runs
T20I 2588	5 May	Kadek Gamantika	Austin Lazarus	Udayana Cricket Ground, Jimbaran	Thailand by 17 runs
T20I 2590	6 May	Kadek Gamantika	Austin Lazarus	Udayana Cricket Ground, Jimbaran	Thailand by 6 wickets

=== Denmark women in Austria ===
WT20I series
No.	Date	Home captain	Away captain	Venue	Result
WT20I 1874	4 May	Jo-Antoinette Stiglitz	Kathrine Brock-Nielsen	Seebarn Cricket Ground, Lower Austria	Austria by 14 runs
WT20I 1875	4 May	Jo-Antoinette Stiglitz	Kathrine Brock-Nielsen	Seebarn Cricket Ground, Lower Austria	Austria by 16 runs
WT20I 1876	5 May	Jo-Antoinette Stiglitz	Kathrine Brock-Nielsen	Seebarn Cricket Ground, Lower Austria	Denmark by 6 wickets

=== Guernsey against Isle of Man women in England ===
WT20I series
No.	Date	Home captain	Away captain	Venue	Result
WT20I 1877	5 May	Krista De La Mare	Lucy Barnett	Norman Edwards Memorial Ground, Winchester	Guernsey by 3 wickets
WT20I 1879	5 May	Krista De La Mare	Lucy Barnett	Norman Edwards Memorial Ground, Winchester	Guernsey by 5 wickets
WT20I 1882	6 May	Krista De La Mare	Lucy Barnett	Norman Edwards Memorial Ground, Winchester	Guernsey by 16 runs (DLS)

=== Mongolia in Japan ===
T20I series
No.	Date	Home captain	Away captain	Venue	Result
T20I 2591	7 May	Kendel Kadowaki-Fleming	Luvsanzundui Erdenebulgan	Sano International Cricket Ground, Sano	Japan by 166 runs
T20I 2593	8 May	Kendel Kadowaki-Fleming	Luvsanzundui Erdenebulgan	Sano International Cricket Ground, Sano	Japan by 205 runs
T20I 2594	8 May	Kendel Kadowaki-Fleming	Luvsanzundui Erdenebulgan	Sano International Cricket Ground, Sano	No result
T20I 2595	9–10 May	Reo Sakurano-Thomas	Luvsanzundui Erdenebulgan	Sano International Cricket Ground, Sano	Japan by 10 wickets
T20I 2602	11 May	Reo Sakurano-Thomas	Luvsanzundui Erdenebulgan	Sano International Cricket Ground, Sano	Japan by 180 runs
T20I 2603	11 May	Reo Sakurano-Thomas	Luvsanzundui Erdenebulgan	Sano International Cricket Ground, Sano	Japan by 158 runs
T20I 2606	12 May	Reo Sakurano-Thomas	Luvsanzundui Erdenebulgan	Sano International Cricket Ground, Sano	Japan by 157 runs

=== 2024 Mdina Cup ===
Pos	Team	Pld	W	L	NR	Pts	NRR
1	France	4	4	0	0	8	1.957
2	Belgium	4	2	2	0	4	−0.239
3	Malta	4	0	4	0	0	−1.720

Source: ESPNcricinfo

Round-robin
No.	Date	Team 1	Captain 1	Team 2	Captain 2	Venue	Result
T20I 2596	9 May	France	Gustav McKeon	Malta	Varun Thamotharam	Dreux Sport Cricket Club, Dreux	France by 9 runs
T20I 2597	9 May	France	Gustav McKeon	Malta	Varun Thamotharam	Dreux Sport Cricket Club, Dreux	France by 86 runs
T20I 2598	10 May	France	Gustav McKeon	Belgium	Ali Raza	Dreux Sport Cricket Club, Dreux	Match tied (France won S/O)
T20I 2600	10 May	Belgium	Ali Raza	Malta	Varun Thamotharam	Dreux Sport Cricket Club, Dreux	Belgium by 16 runs
T20I 2604	11 May	Belgium	Sheraz Sheikh	Malta	Varun Thamotharam	Dreux Sport Cricket Club, Dreux	Belgium by 7 wickets
T20I 2605	11 May	France	Gustav McKeon	Belgium	Sheraz Sheikh	Dreux Sport Cricket Club, Dreux	France by 7 wickets
Final
No.	Date	Team 1	Captain 1	Team 2	Captain 2	Venue	Result
T20I 2608	12 May	France	Gustav McKeon	Belgium	Ali Raza	Dreux Sport Cricket Club, Dreux	Belgium by 15 runs (DLS)

=== Luxembourg women in Belgium ===
WT20I series
No.	Date	Home captain	Away captain	Venue	Result
WT20I 1887	19 May	Shraddha Bhandari	Aarti Priya	Royal Brussels Cricket Club, Waterloo	Luxembourg by 35 runs
WT20I 1889	19 May	Shraddha Bhandari	Aarti Priya	Royal Brussels Cricket Club, Waterloo	Luxembourg by 4 runs
WT20I 1890	20 May	Shraddha Bhandari	Aarti Priya	Royal Brussels Cricket Club, Waterloo	Luxembourg by 6 wickets
WT20I 1891	20 May	Shraddha Bhandari	Aarti Priya	Royal Brussels Cricket Club, Waterloo	Luxembourg by 35 runs

=== 2024 Continental Cup ===
Pos	Team	Pld	W	L	NR	Pts	NRR
1	Hungary	3	3	0	0	6	0.884
2	Gibraltar	3	2	1	0	4	−0.454
3	Romania	3	1	2	0	2	1.003
4	Bulgaria	3	0	3	0	0	−1.431

Source: ESPNcricinfo

Round-robin
No.	Date	Team 1	Captain 1	Team 2	Captain 2	Venue	Result
T20I 2618	24 May	Bulgaria	Prakash Mishra	Gibraltar	Avinash Pai	Moara Vlasiei Cricket Ground, Ilfov County	Gibraltar by 5 wickets
2nd Match	24 May	Gibraltar	Avinash Pai	Hungary	Vinoth Ravindran	Moara Vlasiei Cricket Ground, Ilfov County	Hungary by 9 wickets
T20I 2620	24 May	Romania	Shantanu Vashisht	Bulgaria	Prakash Mishra	Moara Vlasiei Cricket Ground, Ilfov County	Romania by 7 wickets
4th Match	25 May	Romania	Vasu Saini	Hungary	Vinoth Ravindran	Moara Vlasiei Cricket Ground, Ilfov County	Hungary by 5 wickets
5th Match	25 May	Bulgaria	Prakash Mishra	Hungary	Vinoth Ravindran	Moara Vlasiei Cricket Ground, Ilfov County	Hungary by 12 runs
T20I 2624	25 May	Romania	Vasu Saini	Gibraltar	Iain Latin	Moara Vlasiei Cricket Ground, Ilfov County	Gibraltar by 6 wickets
Play-offs
No.	Date	Team 1	Captain 1	Team 2	Captain 2	Venue	Result
T20I 2628	26 May	Romania	Vasu Saini	Bulgaria	Prakash Mishra	Moara Vlasiei Cricket Ground, Ilfov County	Romania by 74 runs
8th Match	26 May	Gibraltar	Iain Latin	Hungary	Vinoth Ravindran	Moara Vlasiei Cricket Ground, Ilfov County	Hungary by 8 wickets

=== Belgium in Austria ===
T20I series
No.	Date	Home captain	Away captain	Venue	Result
T20I 2621	25 May	Aqib Iqbal	Ali Raza	Seebarn Cricket Ground, Lower Austria	Belgium by 6 wickets (DLS)
T20I 2622	25 May	Aqib Iqbal	Ali Raza	Seebarn Cricket Ground, Lower Austria	Austria by 6 wickets
T20I 2627	26 May	Aqib Iqbal	Ali Raza	Seebarn Cricket Ground, Lower Austria	Belgium by 9 wickets (DLS)
T20I 2629	26 May	Aqib Iqbal	Ali Raza	Seebarn Cricket Ground, Lower Austria	Austria by 75 runs

=== Italy women in the Netherlands ===
WT20I series
No.	Date	Home captain	Away captain	Venue	Result
WT20I 1892	28 May	Babette de Leede	Emilia Bartram	Sportpark Harga, Schiedam	Netherlands by 94 runs (Note: Netherlands fielded Madison Landsman in this match, who was deemed to be an ineligible player. Landsman holds a Dutch passport but had played for South Africa under-19s in January 2023 and under the ICC's eligibility criteria she was not eligible to switch allegiance to the Netherlands until January 2026.)
WT20I 1892a	29 May	Babette de Leede	Emilia Bartram	Sportpark Harga, Schiedam	Match abandoned
WT20I 1892b	29 May	Babette de Leede	Emilia Bartram	Sportpark Harga, Schiedam	Match abandoned
WT20I 1894	30 May	Babette de Leede	Emilia Bartram	Sportpark Harga, Schiedam	Netherlands by 8 wickets

=== 2024 Kwibuka Women's T20 Tournament ===
Pos	Team	Pld	W	L	NR	Pts	NRR
1	Uganda	7	7	0	0	14	2.927
2	Zimbabwe A	7	5	2	0	10	2.062
3	Rwanda	7	5	2	0	10	1.946
4	Nigeria	7	4	3	0	8	1.321
5	Kenya	7	4	3	0	8	0.096
6	Botswana	7	2	5	0	4	−1.345
7	Malawi	7	1	6	0	2	−3.430
8	Cameroon	7	0	7	0	0	−3.923

Source: ESPNcricinfo

Round-robin
No.	Date	Team 1	Captain 1	Team 2	Captain 2	Venue	Result
WT20I 1893	30 May	Rwanda	Marie Bimenyimana	Cameroon	Michelle Ekani	Gahanga International Cricket Stadium, Kigali	Rwanda by 102 runs
2nd Match	30 May	Malawi	Vanessa Phiri	Zimbabwe A	Chiedza Dhururu	Gahanga B Ground, Kigali	Zimbabwe A by 92 runs
WT20I 1895	30 May	Botswana	Tuelo Shadrack	Uganda	Janet Mbabazi	Gahanga International Cricket Stadium, Kigali	Uganda by 71 runs
4th Match	31 May	Kenya	Esther Wachira	Zimbabwe A	Chiedza Dhururu	Gahanga International Cricket Stadium, Kigali	Zimbabwe A by 56 runs
WT20I 1896	31 May	Nigeria	Favour Eseigbe	Uganda	Janet Mbabazi	Gahanga B Ground, Kigali	Uganda by 11 runs
WT20I 1897	31 May	Botswana	Tuelo Shadrack	Cameroon	Cynerah Mboe	Gahanga International Cricket Stadium, Kigali	Botswana by 44 runs
WT20I 1898	31 May	Rwanda	Marie Bimenyimana	Malawi	Vanessa Phiri	Gahanga B Ground, Kigali	Rwanda by 9 wickets
WT20I 1899	1 June	Rwanda	Marie Bimenyimana	Botswana	Tuelo Shadrack	Gahanga International Cricket Stadium, Kigali	Rwanda by 74 runs
WT20I 1900	1 June	Kenya	Esther Wachira	Malawi	Vanessa Phiri	Gahanga B Ground, Kigali	Kenya by 32 runs
WT20I 1901	1 June	Cameroon	Cynerah Mboe	Nigeria	Favour Eseigbe	Gahanga International Cricket Stadium, Kigali	Nigeria by 9 wickets
11th Match	1 June	Uganda	Janet Mbabazi	Zimbabwe A	Chiedza Dhururu	Gahanga B Ground, Kigali	Uganda by 75 runs
WT20I 1902	2 June	Kenya	Esther Wachira	Nigeria	Favour Eseigbe	Gahanga B Ground, Kigali	Kenya by 23 runs
WT20I 1903	3 June	Malawi	Vanessa Phiri	Uganda	Janet Mbabazi	Gahanga International Cricket Stadium, Kigali	Uganda by 86 runs
14th Match	3 June	Cameroon	Michelle Ekani	Zimbabwe A	Chiedza Dhururu	Gahanga B Ground, Kigali	Zimbabwe A by 89 runs
WT20I 1904	3 June	Botswana	Tuelo Shadrack	Nigeria	Favour Eseigbe	Gahanga International Cricket Stadium, Kigali	Nigeria by 9 wickets
WT20I 1905	3 June	Rwanda	Marie Bimenyimana	Kenya	Esther Wachira	Gahanga B Ground, Kigali	Rwanda by 52 runs
WT20I 1906	4 June	Rwanda	Marie Bimenyimana	Nigeria	Favour Eseigbe	Gahanga International Cricket Stadium, Kigali	Nigeria by 32 runs
WT20I 1907	4 June	Kenya	Esther Wachira	Uganda	Janet Mbabazi	Gahanga B Ground, Kigali	Uganda by 8 wickets
19th Match	4 June	Botswana	Tuelo Shadrack	Zimbabwe A	Chiedza Dhururu	Gahanga International Cricket Stadium, Kigali	Zimbabwe A by 70 runs
WT20I 1908	4 June	Cameroon	Michelle Ekani	Malawi	Vanessa Phiri	Gahanga B Ground, Kigali	Malawi by 8 wickets
WT20I 1909	5 June	Cameroon	Michelle Ekani	Kenya	Esther Wachira	Gahanga International Cricket Stadium, Kigali	Kenya by 8 wickets
WT20I 1910	5 June	Botswana	Tuelo Shadrack	Malawi	Vanessa Phiri	Gahanga B Ground, Kigali	Botswana by 93 runs
WT20I 1911	5 June	Rwanda	Marie Bimenyimana	Uganda	Janet Mbabazi	Gahanga International Cricket Stadium, Kigali	Uganda by 12 runs
24th Match	5 June	Nigeria	Favour Eseigbe	Zimbabwe A	Chiedza Dhururu	Gahanga B Ground, Kigali	Zimbabwe A by 64 runs
25th Match	7 June	Rwanda	Marie Bimenyimana	Zimbabwe A	Chiedza Dhururu	Gahanga International Cricket Stadium, Kigali	Rwanda by 6 wickets
WT20I 1912	7 June	Malawi	Vanessa Phiri	Nigeria	Favour Eseigbe	Gahanga B Ground, Kigali	Nigeria by 90 runs
WT20I 1913	7 June	Cameroon	Michelle Ekani	Uganda	Janet Mbabazi	Gahanga International Cricket Stadium, Kigali	Uganda by 95 runs
WT20I 1914	7 June	Botswana	Tuelo Shadrack	Kenya	Esther Wachira	Gahanga B Ground, Kigali	Kenya by 44 runs
Play-offs
No.	Date	Team 1	Captain 1	Team 2	Captain 2	Venue	Result
WT20I 1915	8 June	Cameroon	Michelle Ekani	Malawi	Vanessa Phiri	Gahanga B Ground, Kigali	Malawi by 9 wickets
WT20I 1916	8 June	Botswana	Tuelo Shadrack	Kenya	Esther Wachira	Gahanga International Cricket Stadium, Kigali	Kenya by 82 runs
WT20I 1918	8 June	Rwanda	Marie Bimenyimana	Nigeria	Favour Eseigbe	Gahanga B Ground, Kigali	Rwanda by 6 wickets
Final	8 June	Uganda	Janet Mbabazi	Zimbabwe A	Chiedza Dhururu	Gahanga International Cricket Stadium, Kigali	Uganda by 2 runs

== June ==
=== Guernsey in Belgium ===
T20I series
No.	Date	Home captain	Away captain	Venue	Result
T20I 2647	8 June	Sheraz Sheikh	Ollie Nightingale	Royal Brussels Cricket Club, Waterloo	Guernsey by 6 wickets
T20I 2648	8 June	Sheraz Sheikh	Ollie Nightingale	Royal Brussels Cricket Club, Waterloo	Belgium by 4 wickets
T20I 2654	9 June	Burhan Niaz	Ollie Nightingale	Royal Brussels Cricket Club, Waterloo	Belgium by 6 wickets
T20I 2657	9 June	Burhan Niaz	Ollie Nightingale	Royal Brussels Cricket Club, Waterloo	Guernsey by 7 wickets

=== Czech Republic women in Austria ===
WT20I series
No.	Date	Home captain	Away captain	Venue	Result
WT20I 1917	8 June	Jo-Antoinette Stiglitz	Tereza Kolcunova	Seebarn Cricket Ground, Lower Austria	Austria by 137 runs
WT20I 1919	8 June	Jo-Antoinette Stiglitz	Tereza Kolcunova	Seebarn Cricket Ground, Lower Austria	Austria by 134 runs
WT20I 1920	9 June	Jo-Antoinette Stiglitz	Tereza Kolcunova	Seebarn Cricket Ground, Lower Austria	Austria by 106 runs

=== 2024 Men's T20 World Cup Europe Qualifier A ===
Pos	Team	Pld	W	L	NR	Pts	NRR	Qualification
1	Italy (H)	4	4	0	0	8	2.429	Advanced to the final
2	France	4	3	1	0	6	0.702	Advanced to the 3rd place play-off
3	Isle of Man	4	2	2	0	4	1.180	Advanced to the 5th place play-off
4	Luxembourg	4	1	3	0	2	−1.000	Advanced to the 7th place play-off
5	Turkey	4	0	4	0	0	−3.308	Eliminated

Source: ESPNcricinfo
(H) Host

Pos	Team	Pld	W	L	NR	Pts	NRR	Qualification
1	Romania	4	4	0	0	8	1.404	Advanced to the final
2	Austria	4	3	1	0	6	1.466	Advanced to the 3rd place play-off
3	Portugal	4	1	3	0	2	−0.493	Advanced to the 5th place play-off
4	Israel	4	1	3	0	2	−0.984	Advanced to the 7th place play-off
5	Hungary	4	1	3	0	2	−1.075	Eliminated

Source: ESPNcricinfo

Group stage
No.	Date	Team 1	Captain 1	Team 2	Captain 2	Venue	Result
T20I 2652	9 June	Italy	Gareth Berg	Luxembourg	Joost Mees	Roma Cricket Ground, Rome	Italy by 77 runs
T20I 2653	9 June	Hungary	Vinoth Ravindran	Portugal	Najjam Shahzad	Simar Cricket Ground, Rome	Portugal by 15 runs
T20I 2655	9 June	France	Gustav McKeon	Isle of Man	Oliver Webster	Roma Cricket Ground, Rome	France by 16 runs
T20I 2656	9 June	Austria	Aqib Iqbal	Romania	Vasu Saini	Simar Cricket Ground, Rome	Romania by 3 wickets
T20I 2660	10 June	Austria	Aqib Iqbal	Israel	Eshkol Solomon	Roma Cricket Ground, Rome	Austria by 7 wickets
T20I 2661	10 June	Isle of Man	Oliver Webster	Turkey	Gökhan Alta	Simar Cricket Ground, Rome	Isle of Man by 81 runs
T20I 2662	10 June	Portugal	Najjam Shahzad	Romania	Vasu Saini	Roma Cricket Ground, Rome	Romania by 6 wickets
T20I 2663	10 June	Italy	Gareth Berg	France	Gustav McKeon	Simar Cricket Ground, Rome	Italy by 5 wickets
T20I 2667	12 June	Italy	Gareth Berg	Isle of Man	Oliver Webster	Roma Cricket Ground, Rome	Italy by 7 wickets
T20I 2668	12 June	Austria	Aqib Iqbal	Portugal	Najjam Shahzad	Simar Cricket Ground, Rome	Austria by 7 wickets
T20I 2669	12 June	Luxembourg	Joost Mees	Turkey	Gökhan Alta	Roma Cricket Ground, Rome	Luxembourg by 73 runs
T20I 2670	12 June	Hungary	Vinoth Ravindran	Israel	Eshkol Solomon	Simar Cricket Ground, Rome	Hungary by 1 wicket
T20I 2673	13 June	Hungary	Vinoth Ravindran	Romania	Vasu Saini	Roma Cricket Ground, Rome	Romania by 8 wickets
T20I 2674	13 June	France	Gustav McKeon	Luxembourg	Joost Mees	Simar Cricket Ground, Rome	France by 13 runs
T20I 2675	13 June	Israel	Eshkol Solomon	Portugal	Najjam Shahzad	Roma Cricket Ground, Rome	Israel by 2 wickets
T20I 2676	13 June	Italy	Marcus Campopiano	Turkey	Gökhan Alta	Simar Cricket Ground, Rome	Italy by 9 wickets
T20I 2683	15 June	Isle of Man	Oliver Webster	Luxembourg	Joost Mees	Roma Cricket Ground, Rome	Isle of Man by 63 runs
T20I 2684	15 June	Austria	Aqib Iqbal	Hungary	Vinoth Ravindran	Simar Cricket Ground, Rome	Austria by 14 runs
T20I 2686	15 June	France	Usman Khan	Turkey	Gökhan Alta	Roma Cricket Ground, Rome	France by 40 runs
T20I 2687	15 June	Israel	Eshkol Solomon	Romania	Vasu Saini	Simar Cricket Ground, Rome	Romania by 24 runs
Play-offs
No.	Date	Team 1	Captain 1	Team 2	Captain 2	Venue	Result
T20I 2690	16 June	Austria	Aqib Iqbal	France	Usman Khan	Simar Cricket Ground, Rome	Austria by 6 wickets
T20I 2691	16 June	Israel	Eshkol Solomon	Luxembourg	Joost Mees	Roma Cricket Ground, Rome	Israel by 2 wickets
T20I 2695	16 June	Isle of Man	Oliver Webster	Portugal	Najjam Shahzad	Roma Cricket Ground, Rome	Portugal by 88 runs
T20I 2696	16 June	Italy	Gareth Berg	Romania	Vasu Saini	Simar Cricket Ground, Rome	Italy by 160 runs

=== 2024 Women's Central Europe Cup ===
Pos	Team	Pld	W	L	NR	Pts	NRR
1	Gibraltar	4	3	1	0	6	2.355
2	Croatia	4	3	1	0	6	1.329
3	Czech Republic	4	0	4	0	0	−3.714

Source: ESPNcricinfo

Round-robin
No.	Date	Team 1	Captain 1	Team 2	Captain 2	Venue	Result
WT20I 1921	14 June	Czech Republic	Tereza Kolcunova	Gibraltar	Amy Benatar	Vinoř Cricket Ground, Prague	Gibraltar by 54 runs
WT20I 1922	14 June	Czech Republic	Tereza Kolcunova	Croatia	Erin Vukusic	Vinoř Cricket Ground, Prague	Croatia by 71 runs
WT20I 1923	15 June	Croatia	Erin Vukusic	Gibraltar	Amy Benatar	Vinoř Cricket Ground, Prague	Croatia by 29 runs
WT20I 1924	15 June	Czech Republic	Tereza Kolcunova	Croatia	Erin Vukusic	Vinoř Cricket Ground, Prague	Croatia by 9 wickets
WT20I 1925	16 June	Croatia	Erin Vukusic	Gibraltar	Amy Benatar	Vinoř Cricket Ground, Prague	Gibraltar by 10 wickets
WT20I 1926	16 June	Czech Republic	Tereza Kolcunova	Gibraltar	Amy Benatar	Vinoř Cricket Ground, Prague	Gibraltar by 104 runs

=== 2024 Men's Nordic Cup ===
Pos	Team	Pld	W	L	NR	Pts	NRR
1	Norway	5	5	0	0	10	2.032
2	Denmark A	4	2	2	0	4	0.763
3	Finland	5	0	5	0	0	−2.777

Source: ESPNcricinfo

Group stage
No.	Date	Team 1	Captain 1	Team 2	Captain 2	Venue	Result
T20I 2680	14 June	Finland	Amjad Sher	Norway	Raza Iqbal	Kerava National Cricket Ground, Kerava	Norway by 97 runs
2nd Match	15 June	Finland	Amjad Sher	Denmark A	Rizwan Mahmood	Kerava National Cricket Ground, Kerava	Denmark A by 3 wickets
T20I 2685	15 June	Finland	Amjad Sher	Norway	Raza Iqbal	Kerava National Cricket Ground, Kerava	Norway by 7 wickets
4th Match	15 June	Denmark A	Rizwan Mahmood	Norway	Raza Iqbal	Kerava National Cricket Ground, Kerava	Norway by 43 runs
5th Match	16 June	Denmark A	Rizwan Mahmood	Norway	Raza Iqbal	Kerava National Cricket Ground, Kerava	Norway by 3 wickets
T20I 2693	16 June	Finland	Amjad Sher	Norway	Raza Iqbal	Kerava National Cricket Ground, Kerava	Norway by 9 wickets
7th Match	16 June	Finland	Amjad Sher	Denmark A	Rizwan Mahmood	Kerava National Cricket Ground, Kerava	Denmark A by 9 wickets

=== Jersey in Denmark ===
T20I series
No.	Date	Home captain	Away captain	Venue	Result
T20I 2687a	15 June	Hamid Shah	Charles Perchard	Svanholm Park, Brøndby	Match abandoned
T20I 2692	16 June	Hamid Shah	Charles Perchard	Svanholm Park, Brøndby	Jersey by 6 wickets
T20I 2694	16 June	Hamid Shah	Charles Perchard	Svanholm Park, Brøndby	Jersey by 96 runs

=== Estonia in Cyprus ===
During the 2nd T20I, Estonia's Sahil Chauhan set new records for the fastest century (27 balls) and the most sixes in an innings (18) in T20Is.

T20I series
No.	Date	Home captain	Away captain	Venue	Result
T20I 2700	17 June	Scott Burdekin	Arslan Amjad	Happy Valley Ground, Episkopi	Estonia by 5 wickets
T20I 2701	17 June	Scott Burdekin	Arslan Amjad	Happy Valley Ground, Episkopi	Estonia by 6 wickets
T20I 2704	18 June	Scott Burdekin	Arslan Amjad	Happy Valley Ground, Episkopi	Cyprus by 12 runs
T20I 2705	18 June	Scott Burdekin	Arslan Amjad	Happy Valley Ground, Episkopi	Estonia by 26 runs
T20I 2706	19 June	Scott Burdekin	Arslan Amjad	Happy Valley Ground, Episkopi	Cyprus by 4 wickets
T20I 2707	19 June	Scott Burdekin	Arslan Amjad	Happy Valley Ground, Episkopi	Estonia by 31 runs

=== Estonia women in Cyprus ===
WT20I series
No.	Date	Home captain	Away captain	Venue	Result
WT20I 1927	17 June	Iresha Chathurani	Maret Valner	Happy Valley Ground 2, Episkopi	Cyprus by 49 runs
WT20I 1929	17 June	Iresha Chathurani	Maret Valner	Happy Valley Ground, Episkopi	Cyprus by 6 wickets
WT20I 1930	18 June	Iresha Chathurani	Maret Valner	Happy Valley Ground 2, Episkopi	Cyprus by 53 runs
WT20I 1932	18 June	Iresha Chathurani	Maret Valner	Happy Valley Ground, Episkopi	Cyprus by 5 runs
WT20I 1933	19 June	Iresha Chathurani	Maret Valner	Happy Valley Ground 2, Episkopi	No result
WT20I 1936	19 June	Iresha Chathurani	Maret Valner	Happy Valley Ground, Episkopi	Cyprus by 27 runs

=== Hong Kong women in the Netherlands ===
WT20I series
No.	Date	Home captain	Away captain	Venue	Result
WT20I 1928	17 June	Babette de Leede	Natasha Miles	Sportpark Maarschalkerweerd, Utrecht	Netherlands by 84 runs
WT20I 1931	18 June	Babette de Leede	Natasha Miles	Sportpark Maarschalkerweerd, Utrecht	Netherlands by 5 wickets
WT20I 1934	19 June	Babette de Leede	Natasha Miles	Sportpark Maarschalkerweerd, Utrecht	Netherlands by 6 wickets
WT20I 1935	19 June	Babette de Leede	Natasha Miles	Sportpark Maarschalkerweerd, Utrecht	Netherlands by 83 runs

=== Jersey in Guernsey ===
Inter-Insular – T20I series
No.	Date	Home captain	Away captain	Venue	Result
T20I 2714	22 June	Oliver Nightingale	Charles Perchard	King George V Sports Ground, Castel	Jersey by 7 wickets
T20I 2715	22 June	Oliver Nightingale	Charles Perchard	King George V Sports Ground, Castel	Jersey by 8 wickets
T20I 2718	23 June	Oliver Nightingale	Jonty Jenner	Guernsey Rovers Athletic Club Ground, Port Soif	Guernsey by 4 wickets

=== 2024 Kenya Quadrangular Series ===
Pos	Team	Pld	W	L	NR	Pts	NRR
1	Kenya	9	8	0	1	17	2.831
2	Malawi	9	4	4	1	9	−0.636
3	Zambia	9	2	6	1	5	−0.806
4	Rwanda	9	2	6	1	5	−1.324

Source: ESPNcricinfo

Round-robin
No.	Date	Team 1	Captain 1	Team 2	Captain 2	Venue	Result
1st Match	28 June	Kenya	Rakep Patel	Zambia	Javid Patel	Sikh Union Club Ground, Nairobi	Kenya by 8 wickets
T20I 2725	28 June	Malawi	Donnex Kansonkho	Rwanda	Clinton Rubagumya	Sikh Union Club Ground, Nairobi	Malawi by 58 runs
3rd Match	29 June	Malawi	Donnex Kansonkho	Zambia	Javid Patel	Sikh Union Club Ground, Nairobi	Zambia by 5 wickets
T20I 2727	29 June	Kenya	Rakep Patel	Rwanda	Clinton Rubagumya	Sikh Union Club Ground, Nairobi	Kenya by 6 wickets
T20I 2731	1 July	Kenya	Rakep Patel	Malawi	Donnex Kansonkho	Sikh Union Club Ground, Nairobi	Kenya by 9 wickets
6th Match	1 July	Rwanda	Clinton Rubagumya	Zambia	Javid Patel	Sikh Union Club Ground, Nairobi	Rwanda by 30 runs
T20I 2732	2 July	Malawi	Donnex Kansonkho	Rwanda	Clinton Rubagumya	Sikh Union Club Ground, Nairobi	Rwanda by 9 wickets
8th Match	2 July	Kenya	Rakep Patel	Zambia	Javid Patel	Sikh Union Club Ground, Nairobi	Kenya by 6 wickets
T20I 2733	3 July	Kenya	Rakep Patel	Rwanda	Clinton Rubagumya	Sikh Union Club Ground, Nairobi	Kenya by 4 wickets
10th Match	3 July	Malawi	Donnex Kansonkho	Zambia	Javid Patel	Sikh Union Club Ground, Nairobi	Malawi by 5 wickets
11th Match	4 July	Rwanda	Clinton Rubagumya	Zambia	Javid Patel	Sikh Union Club Ground, Nairobi	Zambia by 3 wickets
T20I 2734	4 July	Kenya	Rakep Patel	Malawi	Donnex Kansonkho	Sikh Union Club Ground, Nairobi	Kenya by 67 runs
13th Match	5 July	Malawi	Donnex Kansonkho	Zambia	Javid Patel	Sikh Union Club Ground, Nairobi	Malawi by 4 wickets
T20I 2735	5 July	Kenya	Rakep Patel	Rwanda	Clinton Rubagumya	Sikh Union Club Ground, Nairobi	Kenya by 49 runs
15th Match	6 July	Kenya	Rakep Patel	Zambia	Javid Patel	Sikh Union Club Ground, Nairobi	Kenya by 5 wickets
T20I 2736	6 July	Malawi	Donnex Kansonkho	Rwanda	Clinton Rubagumya	Sikh Union Club Ground, Nairobi	Malawi by 21 runs (DLS)
T20I 2743a	9 July	Kenya	Rakep Patel	Malawi	Donnex Kansonkho	Sikh Union Club Ground, Nairobi	Match abandoned
18th Match	9 July	Rwanda	Clinton Rubagumya	Zambia	Javid Patel	Sikh Union Club Ground, Nairobi	Match abandoned
Play-offs
No.	Date	Team 1	Captain 1	Team 2	Captain 2	Venue	Result
19th Match	10 July	Rwanda	Clinton Rubagumya	Zambia	Javid Patel	Sikh Union Club Ground, Nairobi	Match abandoned
T20I 2747a	10 July	Kenya	Rakep Patel	Malawi	Donnex Kansonkho	Sikh Union Club Ground, Nairobi	Match abandoned

=== Serbia in Slovenia ===
Adria Cup – T20I series
No.	Date	Home captain	Away captain	Venue	Result
T20I 2726	29 June	Izaz Ali	Alister Gajic	Valburga Cricket Ground, Smlednik	Slovenia by 43 runs
T20I 2728	29 June	Izaz Ali	Alister Gajic	Valburga Cricket Ground, Smlednik	Slovenia by 84 runs
T20I 2730	30 June	Izaz Ali	Alister Gajic	Valburga Cricket Ground, Smlednik	Serbia by 27 runs

== July ==
=== 2024 Bali Bash Women's Tri-Nation Series ===
Pos	Team	Pld	W	L	NR	Pts	NRR
1	Indonesia	6	5	1	0	10	3.310
2	Bhutan	6	3	3	0	6	0.071
3	Singapore	6	1	5	0	2	−3.024

Source: CricClubs

Round-robin
No.	Date	Team 1	Captain 1	Team 2	Captain 2	Venue	Result
WT20I 1940	2 July	Indonesia	Ni Wayan Sariani	Bhutan	Dechen Wangmo	Udayana Cricket Ground, Jimbaran	Indonesia by 78 runs
WT20I 1941	2 July	Indonesia	Ni Wayan Sariani	Singapore	Shafina Mahesh	Udayana Cricket Ground, Jimbaran	Indonesia by 9 wickets
WT20I 1942	3 July	Bhutan	Dechen Wangmo	Singapore	Shafina Mahesh	Udayana Cricket Ground, Jimbaran	Bhutan by 52 runs
WT20I 1943	3–4 July	Indonesia	Ni Wayan Sariani	Bhutan	Dechen Wangmo	Udayana Cricket Ground, Jimbaran	Indonesia by 10 wickets (DLS)
WT20I 1944	5 July	Indonesia	Ni Wayan Sariani	Singapore	Shafina Mahesh	Udayana Cricket Ground, Jimbaran	Indonesia by 86 runs
WT20I 1946	6 July	Bhutan	Dechen Wangmo	Singapore	Shafina Mahesh	Udayana Cricket Ground, Jimbaran	Singapore by 4 wickets
WT20I 1948	7 July	Indonesia	Ni Wayan Sariani	Bhutan	Dechen Wangmo	Udayana Cricket Ground, Jimbaran	Bhutan by 6 wickets
WT20I 1949	7 July	Indonesia	Ni Wayan Sariani	Singapore	Shafina Mahesh	Udayana Cricket Ground, Jimbaran	Indonesia by 122 runs
WT20I 1951	8 July	Bhutan	Dechen Wangmo	Singapore	Shafina Mahesh	Udayana Cricket Ground, Jimbaran	Bhutan by 43 runs

=== 2024 Men's T20 World Cup Europe Qualifier B ===
Pos	Team	Pld	W	L	NR	Pts	NRR	Qualification
1	Jersey	4	3	0	1	7	7.333	Advanced to the final
2	Croatia	4	2	1	1	5	−0.266	Advanced to the 3rd place play-off
3	Belgium	4	2	2	0	4	−0.363	Eliminated
4	Switzerland	4	2	2	0	4	−1.089	Eliminated
5	Serbia	4	0	4	0	0	−4.247	Eliminated

Source: ESPNcricinfo

Pos	Team	Pld	W	L	NR	Pts	NRR	Qualification
1	Norway	4	4	0	0	8	2.709	Advanced to the final
2	Germany (H)	4	2	1	1	5	0.583	Advanced to the 3rd place play-off
3	Sweden	4	2	2	0	4	1.895	Eliminated
4	Slovenia	4	1	2	1	3	−3.363	Eliminated
5	Gibraltar	4	0	4	0	0	−2.126	Eliminated

Source: ESPNcricinfo
(H) Host

Group stage
No.	Date	Team 1	Captain 1	Team 2	Captain 2	Venue	Result
T20I 2738	7 July	Jersey	Charles Perchard	Serbia	Mark Pavlovic	Bayer Uerdingen Cricket Ground, Krefeld	Jersey by 165 runs
T20I 2740	7 July	Belgium	Sheraz Sheikh	Switzerland	Faheem Nazir	Bayer Uerdingen Cricket Ground, Krefeld	Belgium by 2 wickets
T20I 2741	8 July	Germany	Venkatraman Ganesan	Gibraltar	Avinash Pai	Bayer Uerdingen Cricket Ground, Krefeld	Germany by 44 runs
T20I 2742	8 July	Norway	Raza Iqbal	Sweden	Imal Zuwak	Bayer Uerdingen Cricket Ground, Krefeld	Norway by 53 runs
T20I 2743	8 July	Belgium	Sheraz Sheikh	Croatia	Daniel Turkich	Bayer Uerdingen Cricket Ground, Krefeld	Croatia by 6 runs (DLS)
T20I 2744	9 July	Norway	Raza Iqbal	Slovenia	Izaz Ali	Bayer Uerdingen Cricket Ground, Krefeld	Norway by 8 wickets
T20I 2745	9 July	Germany	Venkatraman Ganesan	Sweden	Imal Zuwak	Bayer Uerdingen Cricket Ground, Krefeld	Germany by 2 runs
T20I 2746	9 July	Jersey	Charles Perchard	Switzerland	Faheem Nazir	Bayer Uerdingen Cricket Ground, Krefeld	Jersey by 167 runs
T20I 2747	10 July	Croatia	Daniel Turkich	Serbia	Mark Pavlovic	Bayer Uerdingen Cricket Ground, Krefeld	Croatia by 28 runs
T20I 2748	10 July	Belgium	Sheraz Sheikh	Jersey	Charles Perchard	Bayer Uerdingen Cricket Ground, Krefeld	Jersey by 108 runs
T20I 2750	10 July	Gibraltar	Avinash Pai	Slovenia	Izaz Ali	Bayer Uerdingen Cricket Ground, Krefeld	Slovenia by 1 wicket
T20I 2751	11 July	Germany	Venkatraman Ganesan	Norway	Raza Iqbal	Bayer Uerdingen Cricket Ground, Krefeld	Norway by 11 runs
T20I 2752	11 July	Gibraltar	Avinash Pai	Sweden	Imal Zuwak	Bayer Uerdingen Cricket Ground, Krefeld	Sweden by 8 wickets
T20I 2753	11 July	Serbia	Mark Pavlovic	Switzerland	Faheem Nazir	Bayer Uerdingen Cricket Ground, Krefeld	Switzerland by 40 runs
T20I 2753a	12 July	Germany	Venkatraman Ganesan	Slovenia	Izaz Ali	Bayer Uerdingen Cricket Ground, Krefeld	Match abandoned
T20I 2754a	12 July	Croatia	Daniel Turkich	Jersey	Charles Perchard	Bayer Uerdingen Cricket Ground, Krefeld	Match abandoned
T20I 2755	12 July	Belgium	Sheraz Sheikh	Serbia	Mark Pavlovic	Bayer Uerdingen Cricket Ground, Krefeld	Belgium by 77 runs
T20I 2756	13 July	Gibraltar	Avinash Pai	Norway	Raza Iqbal	Bayer Uerdingen Cricket Ground, Krefeld	Norway by 6 runs (DLS)
T20I 2758	13 July	Croatia	Daniel Turkich	Switzerland	Faheem Nazir	Bayer Uerdingen Cricket Ground, Krefeld	Switzerland by 7 wickets
T20I 2760	13 July	Slovenia	Izaz Ali	Sweden	Imal Zuwak	Bayer Uerdingen Cricket Ground, Krefeld	Sweden by 6 wickets
Play-offs
No.	Date	Team 1	Captain 1	Team 2	Captain 2	Venue	Result
T20I 2761	14 July	Germany	Venkatraman Ganesan	Croatia	Daniel Turkich	Bayer Uerdingen Cricket Ground, Krefeld	Germany by 8 wickets
T20I 2763	14 July	Jersey	Charles Perchard	Norway	Raza Iqbal	Bayer Uerdingen Cricket Ground, Krefeld	Jersey by 6 wickets

=== Nigeria in Kenya ===
T20I series
No.	Date	Home captain	Away captain	Venue	Result
T20I 2754	12 July	Lucas Oluoch	Sylvester Okpe	Sikh Union Club Ground, Nairobi	Kenya by 29 runs
T20I 2757	13 July	Rakep Patel	Sylvester Okpe	Sikh Union Club Ground, Nairobi	Kenya by 4 wickets
T20I 2764	15 July	Rakep Patel	Sylvester Okpe	Sikh Union Club Ground, Nairobi	Nigeria by 3 wickets
T20I 2765	16 July	Rakep Patel	Sylvester Okpe	Sikh Union Club Ground, Nairobi	Nigeria by 14 runs
T20I 2766	17 July	Rakep Patel	Sylvester Okpe	Sikh Union Club Ground, Nairobi	Kenya by 4 wickets

=== Guernsey women in Jersey ===
Inter-Insular – WT20I match
No.	Date	Home captain	Away captain	Venue	Result
WT20I 1956	14 July	Chloe Greechan	Krista De La Mare	Grainville Cricket Ground, Saint Saviour	Jersey by 104 runs

=== 2024 Germany Women's Tri-Nation Series ===
Pos	Team	Pld	W	L	NR	Pts	NRR
1	Italy	4	4	0	0	8	1.100
2	Germany	4	1	3	0	2	−0.182
3	Jersey	4	1	3	0	2	−0.742

Source: ESPNcricinfo

Round-robin
No.	Date	Team 1	Captain 1	Team 2	Captain 2	Venue	Result
WT20I 1970	26 July	Germany	Janet Ronalds	Italy	Emilia Bartram	Bayer Uerdingen Cricket Ground, Krefeld	Italy by 9 wickets
WT20I 1972	26 July	Germany	Janet Ronalds	Jersey	Chloe Greechan	Bayer Uerdingen Cricket Ground, Krefeld	Germany by 28 runs
WT20I 1974	26 July	Italy	Emilia Bartram	Jersey	Chloe Greechan	Bayer Uerdingen Cricket Ground, Krefeld	Italy by 12 runs
WT20I 1975	27 July	Germany	Janet Ronalds	Italy	Emilia Bartram	Bayer Uerdingen Cricket Ground, Krefeld	Italy by 6 runs
WT20I 1976	27 July	Germany	Janet Ronalds	Jersey	Chloe Greechan	Bayer Uerdingen Cricket Ground, Krefeld	Jersey by 3 wickets
WT20I 1977	27 July	Italy	Emilia Bartram	Jersey	Chloe Greechan	Bayer Uerdingen Cricket Ground, Krefeld	Italy by 31 runs
Final
No.	Date	Team 1	Captain 1	Team 2	Captain 2	Venue	Result
WT20I 1978	28 July	Germany	Janet Ronalds	Italy	Emilia Bartram	Bayer Uerdingen Cricket Ground, Krefeld	Italy by 7 wickets

=== Italy women in Germany ===
WT20I match
No.	Date	Home captain	Away captain	Venue	Result
WT20I 1980	28 July	Janet Ronalds	Emilia Bartram	Bayer Uerdingen Cricket Ground, Krefeld	Italy by 48 runs

== August ==
=== Spain in Croatia ===
Mediterranean Cup – T20I series
No.	Date	Home captain	Away captain	Venue	Result
T20I 2770	2 August	Jawahar Danikula	Christian Munoz-Mills	Mladost Cricket Ground, Zagreb	Spain by 4 wickets
T20I 2771	3 August	Jawahar Danikula	Christian Munoz-Mills	Mladost Cricket Ground, Zagreb	Spain by 6 wickets
T20I 2772	3 August	Jawahar Danikula	Christian Munoz-Mills	Mladost Cricket Ground, Zagreb	Spain by 8 wickets
T20I 2773	4 August	Jawahar Danikula	Christian Munoz-Mills	Mladost Cricket Ground, Zagreb	Spain by 140 runs
T20I 2774	4 August	Jawahar Danikula	Christian Munoz-Mills	Mladost Cricket Ground, Zagreb	Spain by 161 runs

=== 2024 Women's Nordic Cup ===
Pos	Team	Pld	W	L	NR	Pts	NRR
1	Denmark	4	4	0	0	8	2.037
2	Guernsey	4	3	1	0	6	1.375
3	Norway	4	2	2	0	4	0.422
4	Estonia	4	1	3	0	2	−1.854
5	Finland XI	4	0	4	0	0	−1.980

Updated to match(es) played on 11 August 2024. Source: ESPNcricinfo

WT20I series
No.	Date	Team 1	Captain 1	Team 2	Captain 2	Venue	Result
1st Match	10 August	Denmark	Kathrine Brock-Nielsen	Finland XI	Traijila Mulepati	Ekeberg Cricket Ground 1, Oslo	Denmark by 33 runs
WT20I 1981	10 August	Denmark	Kathrine Brock-Nielsen	Guernsey	Krista De La Mare	Ekeberg Cricket Ground 2, Oslo	Denmark by 5 runs
WT20I 1982	10 August	Norway	Mirab Razwan	Estonia	Maret Valner	Ekeberg Cricket Ground 1, Oslo	Norway by 35 runs
4th Match	10 August	Norway	Mirab Razwan	Finland XI	Traijila Mulepati	Ekeberg Cricket Ground 1, Oslo	Norway by 53 runs
WT20I 1983	10 August	Estonia	Maret Valner	Guernsey	Krista De La Mare	Ekeberg Cricket Ground 2, Oslo	Guernsey by 66 runs
6th Match	11 August	Finland XI	Traijila Mulepati	Guernsey	Krista De La Mare	Ekeberg Cricket Ground 1, Oslo	Guernsey by 8 wickets
WT20I 1984	11 August	Denmark	Kathrine Brock-Nielsen	Estonia	Maret Valner	Ekeberg Cricket Ground 2, Oslo	Denmark by 9 wickets
WT20I 1985	11 August	Norway	Mirab Razwan	Denmark	Kathrine Brock-Nielsen	Ekeberg Cricket Ground 1, Oslo	Denmark by 38 runs
9th Match	11 August	Estonia	Maret Valner	Finland XI	Traijila Mulepati	Ekeberg Cricket Ground 2, Oslo	Estonia by 5 wickets
WT20I 1987	11 August	Norway	Mirab Razwan	Guernsey	Krista De La Mare	Ekeberg Cricket Ground 1, Oslo	Guernsey by 7 wickets

=== 2024 Netherlands Women's T20I Tri-Nation Series ===
Pos	Team	Pld	W	L	NR	Pts	NRR
1	Scotland	2	2	0	0	4	1.075
2	Netherlands	2	0	1	1	1	−1.350
3	Papua New Guinea	2	0	1	1	1	−0.800

Source: ESPNcricinfo

WT20I series
No.	Date	Team 1	Captain 1	Team 2	Captain 2	Venue	Result
WT20I 1989	14 August	Netherlands	Babette de Leede	Papua New Guinea	Brenda Tau	VRA Cricket Ground, Amstelveen	No result
WT20I 1990	15 August	Papua New Guinea	Brenda Tau	Scotland	Abtaha Maqsood	VRA Cricket Ground, Amstelveen	Scotland by 16 runs
WT20I 1991	16 August	Netherlands	Babette de Leede	Scotland	Abtaha Maqsood	VRA Cricket Ground, Amstelveen	Scotland by 27 runs

=== 2024 Men's T20 World Cup East Asia-Pacific Qualifier A ===
Pos	Team	Pld	W	L	NR	Pts	NRR	Qualification
1	Samoa (H)	6	4	2	0	8	1.270	Advanced to the regional final
2	Cook Islands	6	4	2	0	8	−0.008	Eliminated
3	Fiji	6	3	3	0	6	−0.858	Eliminated
4	Vanuatu	6	1	5	0	2	−0.306	Eliminated

Source: ESPNcricinfo
(H) Host

Round-robin
No.	Date	Team 1	Captain 1	Team 2	Captain 2	Venue	Result
T20I 2775	17 August	Cook Islands	Ma'ara Ave	Vanuatu	Joshua Rasu	Faleata Oval 2, Apia	Cook Islands by 9 wickets
T20I 2776	17 August	Samoa	Caleb Jasmat	Fiji	Peni Vuniwaqa	Faleata Oval 2, Apia	Samoa by 9 wickets
T20I 2777	19 August	Samoa	Caleb Jasmat	Cook Islands	Ma'ara Ave	Faleata Oval 2, Apia	Cook Islands by 7 wickets
T20I 2778	19 August	Fiji	Peni Vuniwaqa	Vanuatu	Joshua Rasu	Faleata Oval 2, Apia	Vanuatu by 36 runs
T20I 2779	20 August	Samoa	Caleb Jasmat	Vanuatu	Joshua Rasu	Faleata Oval 2, Apia	Samoa by 10 runs
T20I 2780	20 August	Cook Islands	Ma'ara Ave	Fiji	Peni Vuniwaqa	Faleata Oval 2, Apia	Fiji by 104 runs
T20I 2781	21 August	Samoa	Caleb Jasmat	Fiji	Peni Vuniwaqa	Faleata Oval 2, Apia	Samoa by 73 runs
T20I 2782	21 August	Cook Islands	Ma'ara Ave	Vanuatu	Joshua Rasu	Faleata Oval 2, Apia	Cook Islands by 7 wickets
T20I 2793	23 August	Fiji	Peni Vuniwaqa	Vanuatu	Joshua Rasu	Faleata Oval 2, Apia	Fiji by 5 wickets
T20I 2794	23 August	Samoa	Caleb Jasmat	Cook Islands	Ma'ara Ave	Faleata Oval 2, Apia	Cook Islands by 8 wickets
T20I 2798	24 August	Cook Islands	Ma'ara Ave	Fiji	Peni Vuniwaqa	Faleata Oval 2, Apia	Fiji by 9 runs
T20I 2799	24 August	Samoa	Caleb Jasmat	Vanuatu	Joshua Rasu	Faleata Oval 2, Apia	Samoa by 8 runs

=== Isle of Man women in Malta ===
WT20I series
No.	Date	Home captain	Away captain	Venue	Result
WT20I 1992	17 August	Jessica Rymer	Alanya Thorpe	Marsa Sports Club, Marsa	Isle of Man by 9 wickets
WT20I 1993	18 August	Jessica Rymer	Alanya Thorpe	Marsa Sports Club, Marsa	Isle of Man by 9 wickets
WT20I 1994	19 August	Shamla Cholasseri	Alanya Thorpe	Marsa Sports Club, Marsa	Isle of Man by 9 wickets

=== 2024 Malaysia Tri-Nation Series ===
Pos	Team	Pld	W	L	NR	Pts	NRR
1	Kuwait	4	3	1	0	6	−0.026
2	Hong Kong	4	2	2	0	4	0.218
3	Malaysia	4	1	3	0	2	−0.205

Source: ESPNcricinfo

Round-robin
No.	Date	Team 1	Captain 1	Team 2	Captain 2	Venue	Result
T20I 2783	21 August	Hong Kong	Nizakat Khan	Kuwait	Mohammed Aslam	Selangor Turf Club, Seri Kembangan	Kuwait by 4 wickets
T20I 2788	22 August	Malaysia	Syed Aziz	Kuwait	Mohammed Aslam	Selangor Turf Club, Seri Kembangan	Malaysia by 5 wickets
T20I 2795	23 August	Malaysia	Syed Aziz	Hong Kong	Nizakat Khan	Selangor Turf Club, Seri Kembangan	Hong Kong by 6 wickets
T20I 2800	24 August	Hong Kong	Nizakat Khan	Kuwait	Mohammed Aslam	Selangor Turf Club, Seri Kembangan	Kuwait by 2 wickets
T20I 2805	25 August	Malaysia	Syed Aziz	Kuwait	Mohammed Aslam	Selangor Turf Club, Seri Kembangan	Kuwait by 18 runs
T20I 2812	26 August	Malaysia	Syed Aziz	Hong Kong	Nizakat Khan	Selangor Turf Club, Seri Kembangan	Hong Kong by 7 runs
Final
No.	Date	Team 1	Captain 1	Team 2	Captain 2	Venue	Result
T20I 2814	27 August	Kuwait	Mohammed Aslam	Hong Kong	Nizakat Khan	Selangor Turf Club, Seri Kembangan	Kuwait by 8 wickets

=== 2024 Men's T20 World Cup Europe Qualifier C ===
Pos	Team	Pld	W	L	NR	Pts	NRR	Qualification
1	Denmark	4	3	0	1	7	4.867	Advanced to the final
2	Spain	4	3	0	1	7	1.263	Advanced to the 3rd place play-off
3	Czech Republic	4	2	2	0	4	−0.373	Advanced to the 5th place play-off
4	Cyprus	4	1	3	0	2	−1.629	Advanced to the 7th place play-off
5	Greece	4	0	4	0	0	−2.876	Eliminated

Source: ESPNcricinfo

Pos	Team	Pld	W	L	NR	Pts	NRR	Qualification
1	Guernsey (H)	4	3	1	0	6	2.952	Advanced to the final
2	Finland	4	3	1	0	6	2.184	Advanced to the 3rd place play-off
3	Estonia	4	3	1	0	6	−0.102	Advanced to the 5th place play-off
4	Malta	4	1	3	0	2	−0.577	Advanced to the 7th place play-off
5	Bulgaria	4	0	4	0	0	−3.975	Eliminated

Source: ESPNcricinfo
(H) Host

Group stage
No.	Date	Team 1	Captain 1	Team 2	Captain 2	Venue	Result
T20I 2784	21 August	Cyprus	Roshan Siriwardena	Spain	Christian Munoz-Mills	King George V Sports Ground, Castel	Spain by 15 runs
T20I 2785	21 August	Guernsey	Oliver Nightingale	Bulgaria	Prakash Mishra	Guernsey Rovers Athletic Club Ground, Port Soif	Guernsey by 8 wickets
T20I 2786	21 August	Czech Republic	Dylan Steyn	Denmark	Hamid Shah	King George V Sports Ground, Castel	Denmark by 118 runs
T20I 2787	21 August	Finland	Amjad Sher	Malta	Zeeshan Khan	Guernsey Rovers Athletic Club Ground, Port Soif	Finland by 9 wickets
T20I 2789	22 August	Estonia	Arslan Amjad	Finland	Amjad Sher	King George V Sports Ground, Castel	Estonia by 8 wickets
T20I 2790	22 August	Denmark	Hamid Shah	Greece	Aslam Mohammad	Guernsey Rovers Athletic Club Ground, Port Soif	Denmark by 32 runs
T20I 2791	22 August	Guernsey	Oliver Nightingale	Malta	Zeeshan Khan	King George V Sports Ground, Castel	Guernsey by 8 wickets
T20I 2792	22 August	Czech Republic	Dylan Steyn	Spain	Christian Munoz-Mills	Guernsey Rovers Athletic Club Ground, Port Soif	Spain by 1 run
T20I 2800a	24 August	Denmark	Hamid Shah	Spain	Christian Munoz-Mills	King George V Sports Ground, Castel	Match abandoned
T20I 2801	24 August	Guernsey	Oliver Nightingale	Finland	Amjad Sher	Guernsey Rovers Athletic Club Ground, Port Soif	Finland by 4 runs
T20I 2803	24 August	Cyprus	Scott Burdekin	Greece	Aslam Mohammad	King George V Sports Ground, Castel	Cyprus by 8 wickets
T20I 2804	24 August	Bulgaria	Prakash Mishra	Estonia	Arslan Amjad	Guernsey Rovers Athletic Club Ground, Port Soif	Estonia by 7 wickets
T20I 2806	25 August	Bulgaria	Prakash Mishra	Malta	Zeeshan Khan	King George V Sports Ground, Castel	Malta by 61 runs
T20I 2807	25 August	Cyprus	Scott Burdekin	Czech Republic	Dylan Steyn	Guernsey Rovers Athletic Club Ground, Port Soif	Czech Republic by 4 wickets
T20I 2809	25 August	Guernsey	Oliver Nightingale	Estonia	Arslan Amjad	King George V Sports Ground, Castel	Guernsey by 5 wickets
T20I 2810	25 August	Greece	Aslam Mohammad	Spain	Christian Munoz-Mills	Guernsey Rovers Athletic Club Ground, Port Soif	Spain by 7 wickets
T20I 2815	27 August	Cyprus	Scott Burdekin	Denmark	Hamid Shah	King George V Sports Ground, Castel	Denmark by 142 runs
T20I 2816	27 August	Bulgaria	Prakash Mishra	Finland	Amjad Sher	Guernsey Rovers Athletic Club Ground, Port Soif	Finland by 125 runs
T20I 2818	27 August	Czech Republic	Dylan Steyn	Greece	Aslam Mohammad	King George V Sports Ground, Castel	Czech Republic by 75 runs
T20I 2819	27 August	Estonia	Arslan Amjad	Malta	Zeeshan Khan	Guernsey Rovers Athletic Club Ground, Port Soif	Estonia by 5 wickets
Play-offs
No.	Date	Team 1	Captain 1	Team 2	Captain 2	Venue	Result
T20I 2821	28 August	Spain	Christian Munoz-Mills	Finland	Amjad Sher	King George V Sports Ground, Castel	Spain by 46 runs
T20I 2822	28 August	Cyprus	Scott Burdekin	Malta	Zeeshan Khan	Guernsey Rovers Athletic Club Ground, Port Soif	Cyprus by 6 runs
T20I 2824	28 August	Czech Republic	Dylan Steyn	Estonia	Arslan Amjad	Guernsey Rovers Athletic Club Ground, Port Soif	Estonia by 7 wickets
T20I 2825	28 August	Guernsey	Oliver Nightingale	Denmark	Hamid Shah	King George V Sports Ground, Castel	Guernsey by 6 wickets

=== 2024 Women's Valletta Cup ===
Pos	Team	Pld	W	L	NR	Pts	NRR
1	MCC	4	4	0	0	8	2.656
2	Isle of Man	4	3	1	0	6	4.713
3	Greece	4	2	2	0	4	−0.463
4	Malta	4	1	3	0	2	−2.390
5	Serbia	4	0	4	0	0	−4.366

Source: ESPNcricinfo

WT20I series
No.	Date	Team 1	Captain 1	Team 2	Captain 2	Venue	Result
WT20I 1995	21 August	Malta	Shamla Cholasseri	Isle of Man	Alanya Thorpe	Marsa Sports Club, Marsa	Isle of Man by 9 wickets
2nd Match	22 August	Malta	Shamla Cholasseri	MCC	Charlotte Gallagher	Marsa Sports Club, Marsa	MCC by 116 runs
3rd Match	22 August	Isle of Man	Alanya Thorpe	MCC	Charlotte Gallagher	Marsa Sports Club, Marsa	MCC by 7 wickets
WT20I 1996	23 August	Malta	Shamla Cholasseri	Greece	Aggeliki-ioanna Argyropoulou	Marsa Sports Club, Marsa	Greece by 5 runs
WT20I 1997	23 August	Isle of Man	Alanya Thorpe	Serbia	Sladjana Matijevic	Marsa Sports Club, Marsa	Isle of Man by 205 runs
6th Match	24 August	Greece	Aggeliki-ioanna Argyropoulou	MCC	Charlotte Gallagher	Marsa Sports Club, Marsa	MCC by 52 runs
WT20I 1998	24 August	Malta	Shamla Cholasseri	Serbia	Sladjana Matijevic	Marsa Sports Club, Marsa	Malta by 5 wickets
WT20I 1999	24 August	Greece	Aggeliki-ioanna Argyropoulou	Isle of Man	Alanya Thorpe	Marsa Sports Club, Marsa	Isle of Man by 69 runs
WT20I 2000	25 August	Greece	Aggeliki-ioanna Argyropoulou	Serbia	Sladjana Matijevic	Marsa Sports Club, Marsa	Greece by 79 runs
10th Match	25 August	MCC	Charlotte Gallagher	Serbia	Sladjana Matijevic	Marsa Sports Club, Marsa	MCC by 9 wickets
Final
No.	Date	Team 1	Captain 1	Team 2	Captain 2	Venue	Result
WT20I 2001	25 August	Greece	Aggeliki-ioanna Argyropoulou	Isle of Man	Alanya Thorpe	Marsa Sports Club, Marsa	Isle of Man by 7 wickets

=== 2024 Netherlands T20I Tri-Nation Series ===
Pos	Team	Pld	W	L	NR	Pts	NRR
1	Netherlands	4	3	1	0	6	1.631
2	Canada	4	1	2	1	3	−0.723
3	United States	4	1	2	1	3	−1.433

Source: ESPNcricinfo

No.	Date	Team 1	Captain 1	Team 2	Captain 2	Venue	Result
T20I 2796	23 August	Netherlands	Scott Edwards	Canada	Nicholas Kirton	Sportpark Maarschalkerweerd, Utrecht	Netherlands by 5 wickets
T20I 2802	24 August	Canada	Nicholas Kirton	United States	Monank Patel	Sportpark Maarschalkerweerd, Utrecht	No result
T20I 2808	25 August	Netherlands	Scott Edwards	United States	Monank Patel	Sportpark Maarschalkerweerd, Utrecht	Netherlands by 102 runs
T20I 2813	26 August	Netherlands	Scott Edwards	Canada	Nicholas Kirton	Sportpark Maarschalkerweerd, Utrecht	Canada by 8 runs
T20I 2817	27 August	Canada	Nicholas Kirton	United States	Monank Patel	Sportpark Westvliet, The Hague	United States by 20 runs
T20I 2823	28 August	Netherlands	Scott Edwards	United States	Monank Patel	Sportpark Westvliet, The Hague	Netherlands by 4 runs

=== 2024 Men's T20 World Cup Asia Qualifier A ===
Pos	Team	Pld	W	L	NR	Pts	NRR	Qualification
1	Malaysia (H)	6	5	1	0	10	2.612	Advanced to the regional final
2	Kuwait	6	4	1	1	9	5.053	Advanced to the regional final
3	Hong Kong	6	4	1	1	9	4.945	Eliminated
4	Singapore	6	4	2	0	8	3.141	Eliminated
5	Maldives	6	2	4	0	4	−1.368	Eliminated
6	Myanmar	6	1	5	0	2	−3.712	Eliminated
7	Mongolia	6	0	6	0	0	−7.145	Eliminated

Source: ESPNcricinfo
(H) Host

Group stage
No.	Date	Team 1	Captain 1	Team 2	Captain 2	Venue	Result
T20I 2826	30 August	Malaysia	Syed Aziz	Maldives	Azyan Farhath	Bayuemas Oval, Pandamaran	Malaysia by 94 runs
T20I 2827	30 August	Hong Kong	Nizakat Khan	Myanmar	Htet Lin Aung	UKM-YSD Cricket Oval, Bangi	Hong Kong by 9 wickets
T20I 2828	30 August	Kuwait	Mohammed Aslam	Mongolia	Luvsanzundui Erdenebulgan	Bayuemas Oval, Pandamaran	Kuwait by 160 runs
T20I 2829	31 August	Maldives	Azyan Farhath	Singapore	Manpreet Singh	Bayuemas Oval, Pandamaran	Singapore by 47 runs
T20I 2830	31 August	Malaysia	Syed Aziz	Myanmar	Htet Lin Aung	UKM-YSD Cricket Oval, Bangi	Malaysia by 6 wickets
T20I 2831	31 August	Hong Kong	Nizakat Khan	Mongolia	Luvsanzundui Erdenebulgan	Bayuemas Oval, Pandamaran	Hong Kong by 9 wickets
T20I 2832	2 September	Hong Kong	Nizakat Khan	Singapore	Manpreet Singh	Bayuemas Oval, Pandamaran	Hong Kong by 23 runs (DLS method)
T20I 2833	2 September	Kuwait	Mohammed Aslam	Maldives	Azyan Farhath	UKM-YSD Cricket Oval, Bangi	Kuwait by 142 runs
T20I 2834	2 September	Mongolia	Luvsanzundui Erdenebulgan	Myanmar	Htet Lin Aung	UKM-YSD Cricket Oval, Bangi	Myanmar by 71 runs
T20I 2835	3 September	Hong Kong	Nizakat Khan	Maldives	Umar Adam	UKM-YSD Cricket Oval, Bangi	Hong Kong by 9 wickets
T20I 2836	3 September	Kuwait	Mohammed Aslam	Myanmar	Htet Lin Aung	Bayuemas Oval, Pandamaran	Kuwait by 8 wickets
T20I 2837	3 September	Malaysia	Syed Aziz	Singapore	Manpreet Singh	UKM-YSD Cricket Oval, Bangi	Malaysia by 1 run
T20I 2839	5 September	Malaysia	Syed Aziz	Kuwait	Mohammed Aslam	Bayuemas Oval, Pandamaran	Kuwait by 8 wickets
T20I 2840	5 September	Mongolia	Luvsanzundui Erdenebulgan	Singapore	Manpreet Singh	UKM-YSD Cricket Oval, Bangi	Singapore by 9 wickets
T20I 2841	5 September	Maldives	Azyan Farhath	Myanmar	Htet Lin Aung	Bayuemas Oval, Pandamaran	Maldives by 9 wickets
T20I 2842	6 September	Maldives	Azyan Farhath	Mongolia	Luvsanzundui Erdenebulgan	Bayuemas Oval, Pandamaran	Maldives by 117 runs
T20I 2843	6 September	Kuwait	Mohammed Aslam	Singapore	Manpreet Singh	UKM-YSD Cricket Oval, Bangi	Singapore by 5 wickets
T20I 2845	7 September	Malaysia	Syed Aziz	Hong Kong	Nizakat Khan	Bayuemas Oval, Pandamaran	Malaysia by 3 runs
T20I 2847	9 September	Myanmar	Htet Lin Aung	Singapore	Manpreet Singh	Bayuemas Oval, Pandamaran	Singapore by 8 wickets
T20I 2848	9 September	Malaysia	Syed Aziz	Mongolia	Luvsanzundui Erdenebulgan	UKM-YSD Cricket Oval, Bangi	Malaysia by 10 wickets
T20I 2849	9 September	Kuwait	Mohammed Aslam	Hong Kong	Nizakat Khan	UKM-YSD Cricket Oval, Bangi	No result

== September ==
=== 2024 Capricorn Women's Tri-Nation Series ===
Pos	Team	Pld	W	L	NR	Pts	NRR
1	United Arab Emirates	6	5	1	0	10	0.890
2	Namibia	6	3	3	0	6	−0.337
3	Zimbabwe	6	1	5	0	2	−0.501

Source: ESPNcricinfo

Round-robin
No.	Date	Team 1	Captain 1	Team 2	Captain 2	Venue	Result
WT20I 2002	6 September	Namibia	Sune Wittmann	United Arab Emirates	Esha Oza	Wanderers Cricket Ground, Windhoek	United Arab Emirates by 7 wickets
WT20I 2003	7 September	United Arab Emirates	Esha Oza	Zimbabwe	Chiedza Dhururu	Wanderers Cricket Ground, Windhoek	Zimbabwe by 3 wickets
WT20I 2004	8 September	Namibia	Sune Wittmann	Zimbabwe	Chiedza Dhururu	Wanderers Cricket Ground, Windhoek	Namibia by 3 wickets
WT20I 2005	9 September	Namibia	Sune Wittmann	United Arab Emirates	Esha Oza	Wanderers Cricket Ground, Windhoek	United Arab Emirates by 15 runs
WT20I 2007	10 September	United Arab Emirates	Esha Oza	Zimbabwe	Chiedza Dhururu	Wanderers Cricket Ground, Windhoek	United Arab Emirates by 5 wickets
WT20I 2010	11 September	Namibia	Sune Wittmann	Zimbabwe	Chiedza Dhururu	Wanderers Cricket Ground, Windhoek	Namibia by 5 wickets
WT20I 2011	12 September	Namibia	Sune Wittmann	United Arab Emirates	Esha Oza	Wanderers Cricket Ground, Windhoek	United Arab Emirates by 4 wickets
WT20I 2013	13 September	United Arab Emirates	Esha Oza	Zimbabwe	Chiedza Dhururu	Wanderers Cricket Ground, Windhoek	United Arab Emirates by 9 wickets
WT20I 2018	14 September	Namibia	Sune Wittmann	Zimbabwe	Chiedza Dhururu	Wanderers Cricket Ground, Windhoek	Namibia by 24 runs

=== Rwanda women in Kenya ===
WT20I series
No.	Date	Home captain	Away captain	Venue	Result
WT20I 2006	10 September	Charity Muthoni	Marie Bimenyimana	Sikh Union Club Ground, Nairobi	Kenya by 26 runs
WT20I 2008	11 September	Charity Muthoni	Marie Bimenyimana	Sikh Union Club Ground, Nairobi	Rwanda by 26 runs
WT20I 2009	11 September	Charity Muthoni	Marie Bimenyimana	Sikh Union Club Ground, Nairobi	Rwanda by 7 wickets
WT20I 2012	13 September	Charity Muthoni	Marie Bimenyimana	Sikh Union Club Ground, Nairobi	Rwanda by 3 wickets
WT20I 2017	14 September	Melvin Khagoitsa	Marie Bimenyimana	Sikh Union Club Ground, Nairobi	Rwanda by 18 runs

=== 2024 Copenhagen Cup ===
Pos	Team	Pld	W	L	NR	Pts	NRR
1	Denmark	3	3	0	0	6	1.524
2	Austria	3	2	1	0	4	3.118
3	Norway	3	1	2	0	2	−1.850
4	Luxembourg	3	0	3	0	0	−2.783

Source: ESPNcricinfo

Round-robin
No.	Date	Team 1	Captain 1	Team 2	Captain 2	Venue	Result
WT20I 2014	14 September	Denmark	Kathrine Brock-Nielsen	Norway	Mirab Razwan	Køge Kricket Klub, Køge	Denmark by 42 runs
WT20I 2015	14 September	Austria	Jo-Antoinette Stiglitz	Luxembourg	Aarti Priya	Køge Kricket Klub 2, Køge	Austria by 115 runs
WT20I 2019	14 September	Denmark	Line Ostergaard	Austria	Jo-Antoinette Stiglitz	Køge Kricket Klub, Køge	Denmark by 5 wickets
WT20I 2020	14 September	Luxembourg	Aarti Priya	Norway	Mirab Razwan	Køge Kricket Klub 2, Køge	Norway by 9 runs
WT20I 2023	15 September	Denmark	Kathrine Brock-Nielsen	Luxembourg	Aarti Priya	Køge Kricket Klub, Køge	Denmark by 43 runs
WT20I 2024	15 September	Austria	Jo-Antoinette Stiglitz	Norway	Mirab Razwan	Køge Kricket Klub 2, Køge	Austria by 78 runs
Play-offs
No.	Date	Team 1	Captain 1	Team 2	Captain 2	Venue	Result
WT20I 2025	15 September	Denmark	Kathrine Brock-Nielsen	Austria	Jo-Antoinette Stiglitz	Køge Kricket Klub, Køge	Denmark by 6 wickets
WT20I 2026	15 September	Luxembourg	Aarti Priya	Norway	Mirab Razwan	Køge Kricket Klub 2, Køge	Norway by 22 runs

=== Cyprus women in Serbia ===
Avala Cup – WT20I series
No.	Date	Home captain	Away captain	Venue	Result
WT20I 2016	14 September	Magdalena Nikolic	Iresha Chathurani	Lisicji Jarak Cricket Ground, Belgrade	Cyprus by 7 wickets
WT20I 2021	14 September	Magdalena Nikolic	Iresha Chathurani	Lisicji Jarak Cricket Ground, Belgrade	Cyprus by 22 runs
WT20I 2024a	15 September	Magdalena Nikolic	Iresha Chathurani	Lisicji Jarak Cricket Ground, Belgrade	Match abandoned
WT20I 2026a	15 September	Magdalena Nikolic	Iresha Chathurani	Lisicji Jarak Cricket Ground, Belgrade	Match abandoned

=== Spain women in Greece ===
WT20I series
No.	Date	Home captain	Away captain	Venue	Result
WT20I 2032	20 September	Aggeliki-ioanna Argyropoulou	Elspeth Fowler	Marina Ground, Gouvia	No result
WT20I 2033	21 September	Aggeliki-ioanna Argyropoulou	Elspeth Fowler	Marina Ground, Gouvia	Spain by 65 runs
WT20I 2034	21 September	Aggeliki-ioanna Argyropoulou	Elspeth Fowler	Marina Ground, Gouvia	Spain by 7 wickets
WT20I 2035	22 September	Aggeliki-ioanna Argyropoulou	Elspeth Fowler	Marina Ground, Gouvia	Spain by 9 wickets
WT20I 2037	22 September	Aggeliki-ioanna Argyropoulou	Elspeth Fowler	Marina Ground, Gouvia	Spain by 8 wickets

== See also ==
- International cricket in 2024
