= International cricket in 2024 =

International cricket season

The 2024 International cricket season included matches from April 2024 to September 2024. This calendar included men's Test, men's One Day International (ODI), men's Twenty20 International (T20I), women's Test, women's One Day International (ODI) and women's Twenty20 International (T20I) matches, as well as some other significant series. The 2024 Men's T20 World Cup took place in the West Indies and the United States in June. In addition to the matches shown here, a number of other T20I series involving associate nations were played during this period.

== Season overview ==
International tours
Start date	Home team	Away team	Results [Matches]		
Start date	Home team	Away team	Test	ODI	T20I
18 April 2024	Pakistan	New Zealand	—N/a	—N/a	2–2 [5]
3 May 2024	Bangladesh	Zimbabwe	—N/a	—N/a	4–1 [5]
10 May 2024	Ireland	Pakistan	—N/a	—N/a	1–2 [3]
21 May 2024	United States	Bangladesh	—N/a	—N/a	2–1 [3]
22 May 2024	England	Pakistan	—N/a	—N/a	2–0 [4]
23 May 2024	West Indies	South Africa	—N/a	—N/a	3–0 [3]
6 July 2024	Zimbabwe	India	—N/a	—N/a	1–4 [5]
10 July 2024	England	West Indies	3–0 [3]	—N/a	—N/a
25 July 2024	Ireland	Zimbabwe	1–0 [1]	—N/a	—N/a
27 July 2024	Sri Lanka	India	—N/a	2–0 [3]	0–3 [3]
7 August 2024	West Indies	South Africa	0–1 [2]	—N/a	3–0 [3]
21 August 2024	Pakistan	Bangladesh	0–2 [2]	—N/a	—N/a
21 August 2024	England	Sri Lanka	2–1 [3]	—N/a	—N/a
4 September 2024	Scotland	Australia	—N/a	—N/a	0–3 [3]
9 September 2024	(India) Afghanistan	New Zealand	—N/a	—N/a	—N/a
11 September 2024	England	Australia	—N/a	2–3 [5]	1–1 [3]
International tournaments
Start date	Tournament				Winners
18 May 2024	2024 Netherlands T20I Tri-Nation Series				Ireland
1 June 2024	(Cricket West Indies) (United States) 2024 Men's T20 World Cup				India
16 July 2024	2024 Scotland Tri-Nation Series (round 3)				—N/a
11 August 2024	2024 Netherlands Tri-Nation Series (round 4)				—N/a

Women's international tours
Start date	Home team	Away team	Results [Matches]		
Start date	Home team	Away team	Test	ODI	T20I
16 April 2024	(United Arab Emirates) Ireland	Thailand	—N/a	—N/a	1–0 [2]
18 April 2024	Pakistan	West Indies	—N/a	0–3 [3]	1–4 [5]
28 April 2024	Bangladesh	India	—N/a	—N/a	0–5 [5]
11 May 2024	England	Pakistan	—N/a	2–0 [3]	3–0 [3]
15 June 2024	Sri Lanka	West Indies	—N/a	3–0 [3]	1–2 [3]
16 June 2024	India	South Africa	1–0 [1]	3–0 [3]	1–1 [3]
26 June 2024	England	New Zealand	—N/a	3–0 [3]	5–0 [5]
11 August 2024	Ireland	Sri Lanka	—N/a	2–1 [3]	1–1 [2]
7 September 2024	Ireland	England	—N/a	1–2 [3]	1–1 [2]
International tournaments
Start date	Tournament				Winners
11 April 2024	2024 United Arab Emirates women's Tri-Nation Series				Scotland
25 April 2024	(United Arab Emirates) 2024 Women's T20 World Cup Qualifier				Sri Lanka
19 July 2024	(Sri Lanka) 2024 Women's Twenty20 Asia Cup				Sri Lanka
5 August 2024	2024 Netherlands Women's ODI Tri-Nation Series				Scotland

== April ==
=== 2024 United Arab Emirates women's Tri-Nation Series ===
Pos	Team	Pld	W	L	NR	Pts	NRR
1	Scotland	2	2	0	0	4	1.450
2	Papua New Guinea	2	1	1	0	2	−0.562
3	United States	2	0	2	0	0	−1.107

Source: ESPNcricinfo

Round-robin
No.	Date	Team 1	Captain 1	Team 2	Captain 2	Venue	Result
WODI 1376	11 April	Papua New Guinea	Brenda Tau	United States	Sindhu Sriharsha	ICC Academy Ground, Dubai	Papua New Guinea by 6 wickets
WODI 1377	12 April	Papua New Guinea	Brenda Tau	Scotland	Kathryn Bryce	ICC Academy Ground, Dubai	Scotland by 104 runs
WODI 1379	14 April	Scotland	Kathryn Bryce	United States	Sindhu Sriharsha	ICC Academy Ground, Dubai	Scotland by 41 runs

=== Thailand women against Ireland women in the UAE ===
WT20I series
No.	Date	Home captain	Away captain	Venue	Result
WT20I 1821a	16 April	Laura Delany	Naruemol Chaiwai	The Sevens Stadium, Dubai	Match abandoned
WT20I 1822	18 April	Laura Delany	Naruemol Chaiwai	The Sevens Stadium, Dubai	Ireland by 8 wickets

=== West Indies women in Pakistan ===
2022–2025 ICC Women's Championship — WODI series
No.	Date	Home captain	Away captain	Venue	Result
WODI 1381	18 April	Nida Dar	Hayley Matthews	National Stadium, Karachi	West Indies by 113 runs
WODI 1382	21 April	Nida Dar	Hayley Matthews	National Stadium, Karachi	West Indies by 2 wickets
WODI 1383	23 April	Nida Dar	Hayley Matthews	National Stadium, Karachi	West Indies by 88 runs
WT20I series
No.	Date	Home captain	Away captain	Venue	Result
WT20I 1850	26 April	Nida Dar	Hayley Matthews	National Stadium, Karachi	West Indies by 1 run
WT20I 1856	28 April	Nida Dar	Hayley Matthews	National Stadium, Karachi	West Indies by 7 wickets
WT20I 1862	30 April	Nida Dar	Hayley Matthews	National Stadium, Karachi	West Indies by 2 runs
WT20I 1868	2 May	Nida Dar	Hayley Matthews	National Stadium, Karachi	Pakistan by 8 wickets
WT20I 1871	3 May	Nida Dar	Hayley Matthews	National Stadium, Karachi	West Indies by 8 wickets

=== New Zealand in Pakistan ===
T20I series
No.	Date	Home captain	Away captain	Venue	Result
T20I 2575	18 April	Babar Azam	Michael Bracewell	Rawalpindi Cricket Stadium, Rawalpindi	No result
T20I 2579	20 April	Babar Azam	Michael Bracewell	Rawalpindi Cricket Stadium, Rawalpindi	Pakistan by 7 wickets
T20I 2581	21 April	Babar Azam	Michael Bracewell	Rawalpindi Cricket Stadium, Rawalpindi	New Zealand by 7 wickets
T20I 2582	25 April	Babar Azam	Michael Bracewell	Gaddafi Stadium, Lahore	New Zealand by 4 runs
T20I 2583	27 April	Babar Azam	Michael Bracewell	Gaddafi Stadium, Lahore	Pakistan by 9 runs

=== 2024 Women's T20 World Cup Qualifier ===
Pos	Team	Pld	W	L	T	NR	Pts	NRR	Qualification
1	Sri Lanka	4	4	0	0	0	8	2.778	Advanced to the playoffs
2	Scotland	4	3	1	0	0	6	1.473	Advanced to the playoffs
3	Thailand	4	2	2	0	0	4	0.161	
4	Uganda	4	1	3	0	0	2	−2.856	
5	United States	4	0	4	0	0	0	−1.813	

Source: ESPNcricinfo

Pos	Team	Pld	W	L	T	NR	Pts	NRR	Qualification
1	Ireland	4	4	0	0	0	8	2.462	Advance to the playoffs
2	United Arab Emirates (H)	4	2	2	0	0	4	0.976	Advance to the playoffs
3	Netherlands	4	2	2	0	0	4	0.111	
4	Zimbabwe	4	1	3	0	0	2	−0.844	
5	Vanuatu	4	1	3	0	0	2	−2.537	

Source: ESPNcricinfo
(H) Host

Group stage
No.	Date	Team 1	Captain 1	Team 2	Captain 2	Venue	Result
WT20I 1842	25 April	Sri Lanka	Chamari Athapaththu	Thailand	Naruemol Chaiwai	Tolerance Oval, Abu Dhabi	Sri Lanka by 67 runs
WT20I 1843	25 April	United Arab Emirates	Esha Oza	Ireland	Laura Delany	Sheikh Zayed Cricket Stadium, Abu Dhabi	Ireland by 6 wickets
WT20I 1846	25 April	Scotland	Kathryn Bryce	Uganda	Janet Mbabazi	Tolerance Oval, Abu Dhabi	Scotland by 109 runs
WT20I 1847	25 April	Vanuatu	Selina Solman	Zimbabwe	Mary-Anne Musonda	Sheikh Zayed Cricket Stadium, Abu Dhabi	Vanuatu by 6 wickets
WT20I 1851	27 April	Netherlands	Heather Siegers	Vanuatu	Selina Solman	Tolerance Oval, Abu Dhabi	Netherlands by 100 runs
WT20I 1852	27 April	Uganda	Janet Mbabazi	United States	Sindhu Sriharsha	Sheikh Zayed Cricket Stadium, Abu Dhabi	Uganda by 8 wickets
WT20I 1853	27 April	United Arab Emirates	Esha Oza	Zimbabwe	Mary-Anne Musonda	Tolerance Oval, Abu Dhabi	Zimbabwe by 8 wickets
WT20I 1854	27 April	Scotland	Kathryn Bryce	Sri Lanka	Chamari Athapaththu	Sheikh Zayed Cricket Stadium, Abu Dhabi	Sri Lanka by 10 wickets
WT20I 1857	29 April	Scotland	Kathryn Bryce	United States	Sindhu Sriharsha	Tolerance Oval, Abu Dhabi	Scotland by 44 runs
WT20I 1858	29 April	Ireland	Laura Delany	Zimbabwe	Mary-Anne Musonda	Sheikh Zayed Cricket Stadium, Abu Dhabi	Ireland by 56 runs
WT20I 1859	29 April	Thailand	Naruemol Chaiwai	Uganda	Janet Mbabazi	Tolerance Oval, Abu Dhabi	Thailand by 9 wickets
WT20I 1860	29 April	United Arab Emirates	Esha Oza	Netherlands	Heather Siegers	Sheikh Zayed Cricket Stadium, Abu Dhabi	United Arab Emirates by 10 wickets
WT20I 1863	1 May	Netherlands	Heather Siegers	Zimbabwe	Mary-Anne Musonda	Tolerance Oval, Abu Dhabi	Netherlands by 14 runs
WT20I 1864	1 May	Sri Lanka	Chamari Athapaththu	Uganda	Janet Mbabazi	Sheikh Zayed Cricket Stadium, Abu Dhabi	Sri Lanka by 67 runs
WT20I 1865	1 May	Ireland	Laura Delany	Vanuatu	Selina Solman	Tolerance Oval, Abu Dhabi	Ireland by 9 wickets
WT20I 1866	1 May	Thailand	Naruemol Chaiwai	United States	Sindhu Sriharsha	Sheikh Zayed Cricket Stadium, Abu Dhabi	Thailand by 9 wickets
WT20I 1869	3 May	Scotland	Kathryn Bryce	Thailand	Naruemol Chaiwai	Tolerance Oval, Abu Dhabi	Scotland by 6 wickets
WT20I 1870	3 May	United Arab Emirates	Esha Oza	Vanuatu	Selina Solman	Sheikh Zayed Cricket Stadium, Abu Dhabi	United Arab Emirates by 70 runs
WT20I 1872	3 May	Sri Lanka	Chamari Athapaththu	United States	Sindhu Sriharsha	Tolerance Oval, Abu Dhabi	Sri Lanka by 18 runs
WT20I 1873	3 May	Ireland	Laura Delany	Netherlands	Heather Siegers	Sheikh Zayed Cricket Stadium, Abu Dhabi	Ireland by 54 runs
Semi-finals
WT20I 1878	5 May	Ireland	Laura Delany	Scotland	Kathryn Bryce	Sheikh Zayed Cricket Stadium, Abu Dhabi	Scotland by 8 wickets
WT20I 1880	5 May	Sri Lanka	Chamari Athapaththu	United Arab Emirates	Esha Oza	Sheikh Zayed Cricket Stadium, Abu Dhabi	Sri Lanka by 15 runs
Final
WT20I 1883	7 May	Sri Lanka	Chamari Athapaththu	Scotland	Sarah Bryce	Sheikh Zayed Cricket Stadium, Abu Dhabi	Sri Lanka by 68 runs

=== India women in Bangladesh ===
WT20I series
No.	Date	Home captain	Away captain	Venue	Result
WT20I 1855	28 April	Nigar Sultana	Harmanpreet Kaur	Sylhet International Cricket Stadium, Sylhet	India by 44 runs
WT20I 1861	30 April	Nigar Sultana	Harmanpreet Kaur	Sylhet International Cricket Stadium, Sylhet	India by 19 runs (DLS)
WT20I 1867	2 May	Nigar Sultana	Harmanpreet Kaur	Sylhet International Cricket Stadium, Sylhet	India by 7 wickets
WT20I 1881	6 May	Nigar Sultana	Harmanpreet Kaur	Sylhet International Cricket Stadium, Sylhet	India by 56 runs (DLS)
WT20I 1884	9 May	Nigar Sultana	Harmanpreet Kaur	Sylhet International Cricket Stadium, Sylhet	India by 21 runs

== May ==
=== Zimbabwe in Bangladesh ===
T20I series
No.	Date	Home captain	Away captain	Venue	Result
T20l 2586	3 May	Najmul Hossain Shanto	Sikandar Raza	Zohur Ahmed Chowdhury Stadium, Chattogram	Bangladesh by 8 wickets
T20I 2589	5 May	Najmul Hossain Shanto	Sikandar Raza	Zohur Ahmed Chowdhury Stadium, Chattogram	Bangladesh by 6 wickets
T20I 2592	7 May	Najmul Hossain Shanto	Sikandar Raza	Zohur Ahmed Chowdhury Stadium, Chattogram	Bangladesh by 9 runs
T20I 2599	10 May	Najmul Hossain Shanto	Sikandar Raza	Sher-e-Bangla National Cricket Stadium, Dhaka	Bangladesh by 5 runs
T20I 2607	12 May	Najmul Hossain Shanto	Sikandar Raza	Sher-e-Bangla National Cricket Stadium, Dhaka	Zimbabwe by 8 wickets

=== Pakistan in Ireland ===
T20I series
No.	Date	Home captain	Away captain	Venue	Result
T20I 2601	10 May	Paul Stirling	Babar Azam	Castle Avenue, Dublin	Ireland by 5 wickets
T20I 2609	12 May	Paul Stirling	Babar Azam	Castle Avenue, Dublin	Pakistan by 7 wickets
T20I 2610	14 May	Lorcan Tucker	Babar Azam	Castle Avenue, Dublin	Pakistan by 6 wickets

=== Pakistan women in England ===
WT20I series
No.	Date	Home captain	Away captain	Venue	Result
WT20I 1885	11 May	Heather Knight	Nida Dar	Edgbaston, Birmingham	England by 53 runs
WT20I 1886	17 May	Heather Knight	Nida Dar	County Cricket Ground, Northampton	England by 65 runs
WT20I 1889	19 May	Heather Knight	Nida Dar	Headingley, Leeds	England by 34 runs
2022–2025 ICC Women's Championship — WODI series
No.	Date	Home captain	Away captain	Venue	Result
WODI 1384	23 May	Heather Knight	Nida Dar	County Cricket Ground, Derby	England by 37 runs
WODI 1385	26 May	Heather Knight	Nida Dar	County Ground, Taunton	No result
WODI 1386	29 May	Heather Knight	Nida Dar	County Ground, Chelmsford	England by 178 runs

=== 2024 Netherlands T20I Tri-Nation Series ===
Pos	Team	Pld	W	L	NR	Pts	NRR
1	Ireland	4	3	0	1	7	0.149
2	Scotland	4	1	2	1	3	0.426
3	Netherlands	4	1	3	0	2	−0.425

Source: ESPNcricinfo

Round-robin
No.	Date	Team 1	Captain 1	Team 2	Captain 2	Venue	Result
T20I 2611	18 May	Netherlands	Scott Edwards	Scotland	Richie Berrington	Sportpark Westvliet, Voorburg	Netherlands by 41 runs
T20I 2612	19 May	Netherlands	Scott Edwards	Ireland	Paul Stirling	Sportpark Westvliet, Voorburg	Ireland by 1 run
T20I 2612a	20 May	Ireland	Paul Stirling	Scotland	Richie Berrington	Sportpark Westvliet, Voorburg	Match abandoned
T20I 2614	22 May	Netherlands	Scott Edwards	Scotland	Richie Berrington	Sportpark Westvliet, Voorburg	Scotland by 71 runs
T20I 2615	23 May	Ireland	Paul Stirling	Scotland	Richie Berrington	Sportpark Westvliet, Voorburg	Ireland by 5 wickets
T20I 2619	24 May	Netherlands	Scott Edwards	Ireland	Paul Stirling	Sportpark Westvliet, Voorburg	Ireland by 3 runs

=== Bangladesh in the United States ===
T20I series
No.	Date	Home captain	Away captain	Venue	Result
T20I 2613	21 May	Monank Patel	Najmul Hossain Shanto	Prairie View Cricket Complex, Houston	United States by 5 wickets
T20I 2616	23 May	Monank Patel	Najmul Hossain Shanto	Prairie View Cricket Complex, Houston	United States by 6 runs
T20I 2625	25 May	Aaron Jones	Najmul Hossain Shanto	Prairie View Cricket Complex, Houston	Bangladesh by 10 wickets

=== Pakistan in England ===
T20I series
No.	Date	Home captain	Away captain	Venue	Result
T20I 2614a	22 May	Jos Buttler	Babar Azam	Headingley, Leeds	Match abandoned
T20I 2623	25 May	Jos Buttler	Babar Azam	Edgbaston, Birmingham	England by 23 runs
T20I 2630a	28 May	Moeen Ali	Babar Azam	Sophia Gardens, Cardiff	Match abandoned
T20I 2631	30 May	Jos Buttler	Babar Azam	The Oval, London	England by 7 wickets

=== South Africa in the West Indies (May 2024) ===
T20I series (May 2024)
No.	Date	Home captain	Away captain	Venue	Result
T20I 2617	23 May	Brandon King	Rassie van der Dussen	Sabina Park, Kingston	West Indies by 28 runs
T20I 2626	25 May	Brandon King	Rassie van der Dussen	Sabina Park, Kingston	West Indies by 16 runs
T20I 2630	26 May	Brandon King	Rassie van der Dussen	Sabina Park, Kingston	West Indies by 8 wickets

== June ==
=== 2024 Men's T20 World Cup ===
Group stage

Pos	Team	Pld	W	L	NR	Pts	NRR	Qualification
1	India	4	3	0	1	7	1.137	Advanced to the Super 8 stage
2	United States (H)	4	2	1	1	5	0.127	Advanced to the Super 8 stage
3	Pakistan	4	2	2	0	4	0.294	Eliminated
4	Canada	4	1	2	1	3	−0.493	Eliminated
5	Ireland	4	0	3	1	1	−1.293	Eliminated

Source: ESPNcricinfo
Rules for classification: 1) Points; 2) Wins; 3) Net run rate; 4) Results of games between tied teams; 5) Initial group stage seedings
(H) Hosts

Pos	Team	Pld	W	L	NR	Pts	NRR	Qualification
1	Australia	4	4	0	0	8	2.791	Advanced to the Super 8 stage
2	England	4	2	1	1	5	3.611	Advanced to the Super 8 stage
3	Scotland	4	2	1	1	5	1.255	Eliminated
4	Namibia	4	1	3	0	2	−2.585	Eliminated
5	Oman	4	0	4	0	0	−3.062	Eliminated

Source: ESPNcricinfo
Rules for classification: 1) Points; 2) Wins; 3) Net run rate; 4) Results of games between tied teams; 5) Initial group stage seedings

Pos	Team	Pld	W	L	NR	Pts	NRR	Qualification
1	West Indies (H)	4	4	0	0	8	3.257	Advanced to the Super 8 stage
2	Afghanistan	4	3	1	0	6	1.835	Advanced to the Super 8 stage
3	New Zealand	4	2	2	0	4	0.415	Eliminated
4	Uganda	4	1	3	0	2	−4.510	Eliminated
5	Papua New Guinea	4	0	4	0	0	−1.268	Eliminated

Source: ESPNcricinfo
Rules for classification: 1) Points; 2) Wins; 3) Net run rate; 4) Results of games between tied teams; 5) Initial group stage seedings
(H) Hosts

Pos	Team	Pld	W	L	NR	Pts	NRR	Qualification
1	South Africa	4	4	0	0	8	0.470	Advanced to the Super 8 stage
2	Bangladesh	4	3	1	0	6	0.616	Advanced to the Super 8 stage
3	Sri Lanka	4	1	2	1	3	0.863	Eliminated
4	Netherlands	4	1	3	0	2	−1.358	Eliminated
5	Nepal	4	0	3	1	1	−0.542	Eliminated

Source: ESPNcricinfo
Rules for classification: 1) Points; 2) Wins; 3) Net run rate; 4) Results of games between tied teams; 5) Initial group stage seedings

Group stage
No.	Date	Team 1	Captain 1	Team 2	Captain 2	Venue	Result
T20I 2632	1 June	United States	Monank Patel	Canada	Saad Bin Zafar	Grand Prairie Stadium, Dallas	United States by 7 wickets
T20I 2633	2 June	West Indies	Rovman Powell	Papua New Guinea	Assad Vala	Providence Stadium, Guyana	West Indies by 5 wickets
T20I 2634	2 June	Namibia	Gerhard Erasmus	Oman	Aqib Ilyas	Kensington Oval, Bridgetown	Match tied (Namibia won S/O)
T20I 2635	3 June	South Africa	Aiden Markram	Sri Lanka	Wanindu Hasaranga	Nassau County International Cricket Stadium, East Meadow	South Africa by 6 wickets
T20I 2636	3 June	Afghanistan	Rashid Khan	Uganda	Brian Masaba	Providence Stadium, Guyana	Afghanistan by 125 runs
T20I 2637	4 June	England	Jos Buttler	Scotland	Richie Berrington	Kensington Oval, Bridgetown	No result
T20I 2638	4 June	Nepal	Rohit Paudel	Netherlands	Scott Edwards	Grand Prairie Stadium, Dallas	Netherlands by 6 wickets
T20I 2639	5 June	India	Rohit Sharma	Ireland	Paul Stirling	Nassau County International Cricket Stadium, East Meadow	India by 8 wickets
T20I 2640	5 June	Papua New Guinea	Assad Vala	Uganda	Brian Masaba	Providence Stadium, Guyana	Uganda by 3 wickets
T20I 2641	5 June	Australia	Mitchell Marsh	Oman	Aqib Ilyas	Kensington Oval, Bridgetown	Australia by 39 runs
T20I 2642	6 June	United States	Monank Patel	Pakistan	Babar Azam	Grand Prairie Stadium, Dallas	Match tied (United States won S/O)
T20I 2643	6 June	Namibia	Gerhard Erasmus	Scotland	Richie Berrington	Kensington Oval, Bridgetown	Scotland by 5 wickets
T20I 2644	7 June	Canada	Saad Bin Zafar	Ireland	Paul Stirling	Nassau County International Cricket Stadium, East Meadow	Canada by 12 runs
T20I 2645	7 June	Afghanistan	Rashid Khan	New Zealand	Kane Williamson	Providence Stadium, Guyana	Afghanistan by 84 runs
T20I 2646	7 June	Bangladesh	Najmul Hossain Shanto	Sri Lanka	Wanindu Hasaranga	Grand Prairie Stadium, Dallas	Bangladesh by 2 wickets
T20I 2649	8 June	Netherlands	Scott Edwards	South Africa	Aiden Markram	Nassau County International Cricket Stadium, East Meadow	South Africa by 4 wickets
T20I 2650	8 June	Australia	Mitchell Marsh	England	Jos Buttler	Kensington Oval, Bridgetown	Australia by 36 runs
T20I 2651	8 June	West Indies	Rovman Powell	Uganda	Brian Masaba	Providence Stadium, Guyana	West Indies by 134 runs
T20I 2658	9 June	India	Rohit Sharma	Pakistan	Babar Azam	Nassau County International Cricket Stadium, East Meadow	India by 6 runs
T20I 2659	9 June	Oman	Aqib Ilyas	Scotland	Richie Berrington	Sir Vivian Richards Stadium, North Sound	Scotland by 7 wickets
T20I 2664	10 June	Bangladesh	Najmul Hossain Shanto	South Africa	Aiden Markram	Nassau County International Cricket Stadium, East Meadow	South Africa by 4 runs
T20I 2665	11 June	Canada	Saad Bin Zafar	Pakistan	Babar Azam	Nassau County International Cricket Stadium, East Meadow	Pakistan by 7 wickets
T20I 2665a	11 June	Nepal	Rohit Paudel	Sri Lanka	Wanindu Hasaranga	Central Broward Park, Lauderhill	Match abandoned
T20I 2666	11 June	Australia	Mitchell Marsh	Namibia	Gerhard Erasmus	Sir Vivian Richards Stadium, North Sound	Australia by 9 wickets
T20I 2671	12 June	United States	Aaron Jones	India	Rohit Sharma	Nassau County International Cricket Stadium, East Meadow	India by 7 wickets
T20I 2672	12 June	West Indies	Rovman Powell	New Zealand	Kane Williamson	Brian Lara Cricket Academy, San Fernando	West Indies by 13 runs
T20I 2677	13 June	Bangladesh	Najmul Hossain Shanto	Netherlands	Scott Edwards	Arnos Vale Stadium, Kingstown	Bangladesh by 25 runs
T20I 2678	13 June	England	Jos Buttler	Oman	Aqib Ilyas	Sir Vivian Richards Stadium, North Sound	England by 8 wickets
T20I 2679	13 June	Afghanistan	Rashid Khan	Papua New Guinea	Assad Vala	Brian Lara Cricket Academy, San Fernando	Afghanistan by 7 wickets
T20I 2680a	14 June	United States	Monank Patel	Ireland	Paul Stirling	Central Broward Park, Lauderhill	Match abandoned
T20I 2681	14 June	Nepal	Rohit Paudel	South Africa	Aiden Markram	Arnos Vale Stadium, Kingstown	South Africa by 1 run
T20I 2682	14 June	New Zealand	Kane Williamson	Uganda	Brian Masaba	Brian Lara Cricket Academy, San Fernando	New Zealand by 9 wickets
T20I 2687b	15 June	Canada	Saad Bin Zafar	India	Rohit Sharma	Central Broward Park, Lauderhill	Match abandoned
T20I 2688	15 June	England	Jos Buttler	Namibia	Gerhard Erasmus	Sir Vivian Richards Stadium, North Sound	England by 41 runs (DLS)
T20I 2689	15 June	Australia	Mitchell Marsh	Scotland	Richie Berrington	Daren Sammy Cricket Ground, Gros Islet	Australia by 5 wickets
T20I 2697	16 June	Ireland	Paul Stirling	Pakistan	Babar Azam	Central Broward Park, Lauderhill	Pakistan by 3 wickets
T20I 2698	16 June	Bangladesh	Najmul Hossain Shanto	Nepal	Rohit Paudel	Arnos Vale Stadium, Kingstown	Bangladesh by 21 runs
T20I 2699	16 June	Netherlands	Scott Edwards	Sri Lanka	Wanindu Hasaranga	Daren Sammy Cricket Ground, Gros Islet	Sri Lanka by 83 runs
T20I 2702	17 June	New Zealand	Kane Williamson	Papua New Guinea	Assad Vala	Brian Lara Cricket Academy, San Fernando	New Zealand by 7 wickets
T20I 2703	17 June	West Indies	Rovman Powell	Afghanistan	Rashid Khan	Daren Sammy Cricket Ground, Gros Islet	West Indies by 104 runs

Super 8

Pos	Team	Pld	W	L	NR	Pts	NRR	Qualification
1	India	3	3	0	0	6	2.017	Advanced to the knockout stage
2	Afghanistan	3	2	1	0	4	−0.305	Advanced to the knockout stage
3	Australia	3	1	2	0	2	−0.331	Eliminated
4	Bangladesh	3	0	3	0	0	−1.709	Eliminated

Source: ESPNcricinfo
Rules for classification: 1) Points; 2) Wins; 3) Net run rate; 4) Results of games between tied teams; 5) T20I Rankings ahead of the tournament

Pos	Team	Pld	W	L	NR	Pts	NRR	Qualification
1	South Africa	3	3	0	0	6	0.599	Advanced to the knockout stage
2	England	3	2	1	0	4	1.992	Advanced to the knockout stage
3	West Indies (H)	3	1	2	0	2	0.963	Eliminated
4	United States (H)	3	0	3	0	0	−3.906	Eliminated

Source: ESPNcricinfo
Rules for classification: 1) Points; 2) Wins; 3) Net run rate; 4) Results of games between tied teams; 5) T20I Rankings ahead of the tournament
(H) Hosts

Super 8
No.	Date	Team 1	Captain 1	Team 2	Captain 2	Venue	Result
T20I 2708	19 June	United States	Aaron Jones	South Africa	Aiden Markram	Sir Vivian Richards Stadium, North Sound	South Africa by 18 runs
T20I 2709	19 June	England	Jos Buttler	West Indies	Rovman Powell	Daren Sammy Cricket Ground, Gros Islet	England by 8 wickets
T20I 2710	20 June	Afghanistan	Rashid Khan	India	Rohit Sharma	Kensington Oval, Bridgetown	India by 47 runs
T20I 2711	20 June	Australia	Mitchell Marsh	Bangladesh	Najmul Hossain Shanto	Sir Vivian Richards Stadium, North Sound	Australia by 28 runs (DLS)
T20I 2712	21 June	England	Jos Buttler	South Africa	Aiden Markram	Daren Sammy Cricket Ground, Gros Islet	South Africa by 7 runs
T20I 2713	21 June	United States	Aaron Jones	West Indies	Rovman Powell	Kensington Oval, Bridgetown	West Indies by 9 wickets
T20I 2716	22 June	Bangladesh	Najmul Hossain Shanto	India	Rohit Sharma	Sir Vivian Richards Stadium, North Sound	India by 50 runs
T20I 2717	22 June	Afghanistan	Rashid Khan	Australia	Mitchell Marsh	Arnos Vale Stadium, Kingstown	Afghanistan by 21 runs
T20I 2719	23 June	United States	Aaron Jones	England	Jos Buttler	Kensington Oval, Bridgetown	England by 10 wickets
T20I 2720	23 June	West Indies	Rovman Powell	South Africa	Aiden Markram	Sir Vivian Richards Stadium, North Sound	South Africa by 3 wickets (DLS)
T20I 2721	24 June	Australia	Mitchell Marsh	India	Rohit Sharma	Daren Sammy Cricket Ground, Gros Islet	India by 24 runs
T20I 2722	24 June	Afghanistan	Rashid Khan	Bangladesh	Najmul Hossain Shanto	Arnos Vale Stadium, Kingstown	Afghanistan by 8 runs (DLS)

Knockout stage

Semi-finals
No.	Date	Team 1	Captain 1	Team 2	Captain 2	Venue	Result
T20I 2723	26 June	Afghanistan	Rashid Khan	South Africa	Aiden Markram	Brian Lara Cricket Academy, San Fernando	South Africa by 9 wickets
T20I 2724	27 June	England	Jos Buttler	India	Rohit Sharma	Providence Stadium, Guyana	India by 68 runs
2024 Men's T20 World Cup final
No.	Date	Team 1	Captain 1	Team 2	Captain 2	Venue	Result
T20I 2729	29 June	India	Rohit Sharma	South Africa	Aiden Markram	Kensington Oval, Bridgetown	India by 7 runs

=== West Indies women in Sri Lanka ===
2022–2025 ICC Women's Championship — WODI series
No.	Date	Home captain	Away captain	Venue	Result
WODI 1387	15 June	Chamari Athapaththu	Hayley Matthews	Mahinda Rajapaksa International Cricket Stadium, Hambantota	Sri Lanka by 6 wickets
WODI 1389	18 June	Chamari Athapaththu	Shemaine Campbelle	Mahinda Rajapaksa International Cricket Stadium, Hambantota	Sri Lanka by 5 wickets
WODI 1391	21 June	Chamari Athapaththu	Shemaine Campbelle	Mahinda Rajapaksa International Cricket Stadium, Hambantota	Sri Lanka by 160 runs
WT20I series
No.	Date	Home captain	Away captain	Venue	Result
WT20I 1937	24 June	Chamari Athapaththu	Hayley Matthews	Mahinda Rajapaksa International Cricket Stadium, Hambantota	Sri Lanka by 4 wickets
WT20I 1938	26 June	Chamari Athapaththu	Hayley Matthews	Mahinda Rajapaksa International Cricket Stadium, Hambantota	West Indies by 6 wickets (DLS)
WT20I 1939	28 June	Chamari Athapaththu	Hayley Matthews	Mahinda Rajapaksa International Cricket Stadium, Hambantota	West Indies by 4 wickets

=== South Africa women in India ===
2022–2025 ICC Women's Championship — WODI series
No.	Date	Home captain	Away captain	Venue	Result
WODI 1388	16 June	Harmanpreet Kaur	Laura Wolvaardt	M. Chinnaswamy Stadium, Bangalore	India by 143 runs
WODI 1390	19 June	Harmanpreet Kaur	Laura Wolvaardt	M. Chinnaswamy Stadium, Bangalore	India by 4 runs
WODI 1392	23 June	Harmanpreet Kaur	Laura Wolvaardt	M. Chinnaswamy Stadium, Bangalore	India by 6 wickets
Only WTest
No.	Date	Home captain	Away captain	Venue	Result
WTest 149	28 June – 1 July	Harmanpreet Kaur	Laura Wolvaardt	M. A. Chidambaram Stadium, Chennai	India by 10 wickets
WT20I series
No.	Date	Home captain	Away captain	Venue	Result
WT20I 1945	5 July	Harmanpreet Kaur	Laura Wolvaardt	M. A. Chidambaram Stadium, Chennai	South Africa by 12 runs
WT20I 1950	7 July	Harmanpreet Kaur	Laura Wolvaardt	M. A. Chidambaram Stadium, Chennai	No result
WT20I 1952	9 July	Harmanpreet Kaur	Laura Wolvaardt	M. A. Chidambaram Stadium, Chennai	India by 10 wickets

=== New Zealand women in England ===
WODI series
No.	Date	Home captain	Away captain	Venue	Result
WODI 1393	26 June	Heather Knight	Sophie Devine	Riverside Ground, Chester-le-Street	England by 9 wickets
WODI 1394	30 June	Heather Knight	Sophie Devine	New Road, Worcester	England by 8 wickets
WODI 1395	3 July	Heather Knight	Sophie Devine	Bristol County Ground, Bristol	England by 5 wickets
WT20I series
No.	Date	Home captain	Away captain	Venue	Result
WT20I 1947	6 July	Heather Knight	Sophie Devine	Rose Bowl, Southampton	England by 59 runs
WT20I 1953	9 July	Heather Knight	Sophie Devine	County Cricket Ground, Hove	England by 23 runs (DLS)
WT20I 1954	11 July	Nat Sciver-Brunt	Sophie Devine	St Lawrence Ground, Canterbury	England by 6 wickets
WT20I 1955	13 July	Heather Knight	Sophie Devine	The Oval, London	England by 7 wickets
WT20I 1957	17 July	Heather Knight	Sophie Devine	Lord's, London	England by 20 runs

== July ==
=== India in Zimbabwe ===
T20I series
No.	Date	Home captain	Away captain	Venue	Result
T20I 2737	6 July	Sikandar Raza	Shubman Gill	Harare Sports Club, Harare	Zimbabwe by 13 runs
T20I 2739	7 July	Sikandar Raza	Shubman Gill	Harare Sports Club, Harare	India by 100 runs
T20I 2749	10 July	Sikandar Raza	Shubman Gill	Harare Sports Club, Harare	India by 23 runs
T20I 2758	13 July	Sikandar Raza	Shubman Gill	Harare Sports Club, Harare	India by 10 wickets
T20I 2762	14 July	Sikandar Raza	Shubman Gill	Harare Sports Club, Harare	India by 42 runs

=== West Indies in England ===
2023–2025 ICC World Test Championship – Test series
No.	Date	Home captain	Away captain	Venue	Result
Test 2538	10–14 July	Ben Stokes	Kraigg Brathwaite	Lord's, London	England by an innings and 114 runs
Test 2539	18–22 July	Ben Stokes	Kraigg Brathwaite	Trent Bridge, Nottingham	England by 241 runs
Test 2541	26–30 July	Ben Stokes	Kraigg Brathwaite	Edgbaston, Birmingham	England by 10 wickets

=== 2024 Scotland Tri-Nation Series (round 3) ===
2024–2026 Cricket World Cup League 2 – Tri-series
No.	Date	Team 1	Captain 1	Team 2	Captain 2	Venue	Result
ODI 4746	16 July	Scotland	Richie Berrington	Oman	Aqib Ilyas	Forthill, Dundee	No result
ODI 4747	18 July	Namibia	Gerhard Erasmus	Oman	Aqib Ilyas	Forthill, Dundee	Namibia by 6 wickets
ODI 4748	20 July	Scotland	Richie Berrington	Namibia	Gerhard Erasmus	Forthill, Dundee	Scotland by 47 runs (DLS)
ODI 4749	22 July	Scotland	Richie Berrington	Oman	Aqib Ilyas	Forthill, Dundee	Scotland by 8 wickets
ODI 4750	24 July	Namibia	Gerhard Erasmus	Oman	Aqib Ilyas	Forthill, Dundee	Oman by 4 wickets
ODI 4751	26 July	Scotland	Richie Berrington	Namibia	Gerhard Erasmus	Forthill, Dundee	Scotland by 138 runs

=== 2024 Women's Twenty20 Asia Cup ===
Pos	Team	Pld	W	L	T	NR	Pts	NRR	Qualification
1	India	3	3	0	0	0	6	3.615	Advanced to the semi-finals
2	Pakistan	3	2	1	0	0	4	1.102	Advanced to the semi-finals
3	Nepal	3	1	2	0	0	2	−2.042	
4	United Arab Emirates	3	0	3	0	0	0	−2.780	

Source: ESPNcricinfo

Pos	Team	Pld	W	L	T	NR	Pts	NRR	Qualification
1	Sri Lanka	3	3	0	0	0	6	3.988	Advanced to the semi-finals
2	Bangladesh	3	2	1	0	0	4	1.971	Advanced to the semi-finals
3	Thailand	3	1	2	0	0	2	−0.858	
4	Malaysia	3	0	3	0	0	0	−4.667	

Source: ESPNcricinfo

Group stage
No.	Date	Team 1	Captain 1	Team 2	Captain 2	Venue	Result
WT20I 1958	19 July	Nepal	Indu Barma	United Arab Emirates	Esha Oza	Rangiri Dambulla International Stadium, Dambulla	Nepal by 6 wickets
WT20I 1959	19 July	India	Harmanpreet Kaur	Pakistan	Nida Dar	Rangiri Dambulla International Stadium, Dambulla	India by 7 wickets
WT20I 1960	20 July	Malaysia	Winifred Duraisingam	Thailand	Thipatcha Putthawong	Rangiri Dambulla International Stadium, Dambulla	Thailand by 22 runs
WT20I 1961	20 July	Sri Lanka	Chamari Athapaththu	Bangladesh	Nigar Sultana	Rangiri Dambulla International Stadium, Dambulla	Sri Lanka by 7 wickets
WT20I 1962	21 July	India	Harmanpreet Kaur	United Arab Emirates	Esha Oza	Rangiri Dambulla International Stadium, Dambulla	India by 78 runs
WT20I 1963	21 July	Nepal	Indu Barma	Pakistan	Nida Dar	Rangiri Dambulla International Stadium, Dambulla	Pakistan by 9 wickets
WT20I 1964	22 July	Sri Lanka	Chamari Athapaththu	Malaysia	Winifred Duraisingam	Rangiri Dambulla International Stadium, Dambulla	Sri Lanka by 144 runs
WT20I 1965	22 July	Bangladesh	Nigar Sultana	Thailand	Thipatcha Putthawong	Rangiri Dambulla International Stadium, Dambulla	Bangladesh by 7 wickets
WT20I 1966	23 July	Pakistan	Nida Dar	United Arab Emirates	Esha Oza	Rangiri Dambulla International Stadium, Dambulla	Pakistan by 10 wickets
WT20I 1967	23 July	India	Smriti Mandhana	Nepal	Indu Barma	Rangiri Dambulla International Stadium, Dambulla	India by 82 runs
WT20I 1968	24 July	Bangladesh	Nigar Sultana	Malaysia	Winifred Duraisingam	Rangiri Dambulla International Stadium, Dambulla	Bangladesh by 114 runs
WT20I 1969	24 July	Sri Lanka	Chamari Athapaththu	Thailand	Thipatcha Putthawong	Rangiri Dambulla International Stadium, Dambulla	Sri Lanka by 10 wickets
Semi-Finals
No.	Date	Team 1	Captain 1	Team 2	Captain 2	Venue	Result
WT20I 1971	26 July	Bangladesh	Nigar Sultana	India	Harmanpreet Kaur	Rangiri Dambulla International Stadium, Dambulla	India by 10 wickets
WT20I 1973	26 July	Sri Lanka	Chamari Athapaththu	Pakistan	Nida Dar	Rangiri Dambulla International Stadium, Dambulla	Sri Lanka by 3 wickets
Final
WT20I 1979	28 July	Sri Lanka	Chamari Athapaththu	India	Harmanpreet Kaur	Rangiri Dambulla International Stadium, Dambulla	Sri Lanka by 8 wickets

=== Zimbabwe in Ireland ===
Test series
No.	Date	Home captain	Away captain	Venue	Result
Test 2540	25–28 July	Andrew Balbirnie	Craig Ervine	Stormont, Belfast	Ireland by 4 wickets

=== India in Sri Lanka ===
T20I series
No.	Date	Home captain	Away captain	Venue	Result
T20I 2767	27 July	Charith Asalanka	Suryakumar Yadav	Pallekele International Cricket Stadium, Kandy	India by 43 runs
T20I 2768	28 July	Charith Asalanka	Suryakumar Yadav	Pallekele International Cricket Stadium, Kandy	India by 7 wickets (DLS)
T20I 2769	30 July	Charith Asalanka	Suryakumar Yadav	Pallekele International Cricket Stadium, Kandy	Match tied (India won S/O)
ODI series
No.	Date	Home captain	Away captain	Venue	Result
ODI 4752	2 August	Charith Asalanka	Rohit Sharma	R. Premadasa Stadium, Colombo	Match tied
ODI 4753	4 August	Charith Asalanka	Rohit Sharma	R. Premadasa Stadium, Colombo	Sri Lanka by 32 runs
ODI 4754	7 August	Charith Asalanka	Rohit Sharma	R. Premadasa Stadium, Colombo	Sri Lanka by 110 runs

== August ==
=== 2024 Netherlands Women's ODI Tri-Nation Series ===
Pos	Team	Pld	W	L	NR	Pts	NRR
1	Scotland	4	3	1	0	6	0.803
2	Netherlands	4	3	1	0	6	0.323
3	Papua New Guinea	4	0	4	0	0	−1.189

Source: ESPNcricinfo

WODI series
No.	Date	Team 1	Captain 1	Team 2	Captain 2	Venue	Result
WODI 1396	5 August	Netherlands	Babette de Leede	Papua New Guinea	Brenda Tau	Sportpark Maarschalkerweerd, Utrecht	Netherlands by 3 wickets
WODI 1397	6 August	Papua New Guinea	Brenda Tau	Scotland	Abtaha Maqsood	Sportpark Maarschalkerweerd, Utrecht	Scotland by 62 runs
WODI 1398	8 August	Netherlands	Babette de Leede	Scotland	Abtaha Maqsood	VRA Cricket Ground, Amstelveen	Netherlands by 3 wickets
WODI 1399	9 August	Netherlands	Babette de Leede	Papua New Guinea	Brenda Tau	VRA Cricket Ground, Amstelveen	Netherlands by 1 wicket
WODI 1400	11 August	Papua New Guinea	Brenda Tau	Scotland	Abtaha Maqsood	VRA Cricket Ground, Amstelveen	Scotland by 4 wickets
WODI 1401	12 August	Netherlands	Babette de Leede	Scotland	Abtaha Maqsood	VRA Cricket Ground, Amstelveen	Scotland by 34 runs

=== South Africa in the West Indies (August 2024) ===
2023–2025 ICC World Test Championship – Test series
No.	Date	Home captain	Away captain	Venue	Result
Test 2542	7–11 August	Kraigg Brathwaite	Temba Bavuma	Queen's Park Oval, Port of Spain	Match drawn
Test 2543	15–19 August	Kraigg Brathwaite	Temba Bavuma	Providence Stadium, Providence	South Africa by 40 runs
T20I series (August 2024)
No.	Date	Home captain	Away captain	Venue	Result
T20I 2797	23 August	Rovman Powell	Aiden Markram	Brian Lara Cricket Academy, San Fernando	West Indies by 7 wickets
T20I 2811	25 August	Rovman Powell	Aiden Markram	Brian Lara Cricket Academy, San Fernando	West Indies by 30 runs
T20I 2820	27 August	Roston Chase	Aiden Markram	Brian Lara Cricket Academy, San Fernando	West Indies by 8 wickets (DLS)

=== 2024 Netherlands Tri-Nation Series (round 4) ===
2024–2026 Cricket World Cup League 2 – Tri-series
No.	Date	Team 1	Captain 1	Team 2	Captain 2	Venue	Result
ODI 4755	11 August	Netherlands	Scott Edwards	Canada	Nicholas Kirton	Sportpark Westvliet, The Hague	Netherlands by 5 wickets
ODI 4756	13 August	Canada	Nicholas Kirton	United States	Monank Patel	Sportpark Westvliet, The Hague	United States by 14 runs
ODI 4757	15 August	Netherlands	Scott Edwards	United States	Monank Patel	Sportpark Westvliet, The Hague	Netherlands by 19 runs
ODI 4758	17 August	Netherlands	Scott Edwards	Canada	Nicholas Kirton	Hazelaarweg Stadion, Rotterdam	Netherlands by 63 runs
ODI 4759	19 August	Canada	Nicholas Kirton	United States	Monank Patel	Hazelaarweg Stadion, Rotterdam	United States by 50 runs
ODI 4760	21 August	Netherlands	Scott Edwards	United States	Monank Patel	Hazelaarweg Stadion, Rotterdam	Netherlands by 27 runs

=== Sri Lanka women in Ireland ===
WT20I series
No.	Date	Home captain	Away captain	Venue	Result
WT20I 1986	11 August	Laura Delany	Anushka Sanjeewani	Sydney Parade, Dublin	Sri Lanka by 7 wickets
WT20I 1988	13 August	Laura Delany	Anushka Sanjeewani	Sydney Parade, Dublin	Ireland by 7 runs
2022–2025 ICC Women's Championship — WODI series
No.	Date	Home captain	Away captain	Venue	Result
WODI 1402	16 August	Gaby Lewis	Chamari Athapaththu	Stormont, Belfast	Ireland by 3 wickets
WODI 1403	18 August	Orla Prendergast	Chamari Athapaththu	Stormont, Belfast	Ireland by 15 runs
WODI 1404	20 August	Orla Prendergast	Chamari Athapaththu	Stormont, Belfast	Sri Lanka by 8 wickets

=== Bangladesh in Pakistan ===
2023–2025 ICC World Test Championship – Test series
No.	Date	Home captain	Away captain	Venue	Result
Test 2544	21–25 August	Shan Masood	Najmul Hossain Shanto	Rawalpindi Cricket Stadium, Rawalpindi	Bangladesh by 10 wickets
Test 2547	30 August–3 September	Shan Masood	Najmul Hossain Shanto	Rawalpindi Cricket Stadium, Rawalpindi	Bangladesh by 6 wickets

=== Sri Lanka in England ===
2023–2025 ICC World Test Championship – Test series
No.	Date	Home captain	Away captain	Venue	Result
Test 2545	21–25 August	Ollie Pope	Dhananjaya de Silva	Old Trafford, Manchester	England by 5 wickets
Test 2546	29 August–2 September	Ollie Pope	Dhananjaya de Silva	Lord's, London	England by 190 runs
Test 2548	6–10 September	Ollie Pope	Dhananjaya de Silva	The Oval, London	Sri Lanka by 8 wickets

== September ==
=== Australia in Scotland ===
T20I series
No.	Date	Home captain	Away captain	Venue	Result
T20I 2838	4 September	Richie Berrington	Mitchell Marsh	The Grange Club, Edinburgh	Australia by 7 wickets
T20I 2844	6 September	Richie Berrington	Mitchell Marsh	The Grange Club, Edinburgh	Australia by 70 runs
T20I 2846	7 September	Richie Berrington	Mitchell Marsh	The Grange Club, Edinburgh	Australia by 6 wickets

=== England women in Ireland ===
2022–2025 ICC Women's Championship — WODI series
No.	Date	Home captain	Away captain	Venue	Result
WODI 1405	7 September	Gaby Lewis	Kate Cross	Stormont, Belfast	England by 4 wickets
WODI 1406	9 September	Gaby Lewis	Kate Cross	Stormont, Belfast	England by 275 runs
WODI 1407	11 September	Gaby Lewis	Kate Cross	Stormont, Belfast	Ireland by 3 wickets (DLS)
WT20I series
No.	Date	Home captain	Away captain	Venue	Result
WT20I 2022	14 September	Gaby Lewis	Kate Cross	Castle Avenue, Clontarf	England by 67 runs
WT20I 2027	15 September	Gaby Lewis	Kate Cross	Castle Avenue, Clontarf	Ireland by 5 wickets

=== New Zealand against Afghanistan in India ===
Test series
No.	Date	Venue	Result
Test 2548a	9–13 September	Shaheed Vijay Singh Pathik Sports Complex, Greater Noida	Match abandoned

=== Australia in England ===
T20I series
No.	Date	Home captain	Away captain	Venue	Result
T20I 2850	11 September	Phil Salt	Mitchell Marsh	Rose Bowl, Southampton	Australia by 28 runs
T20I 2851	13 September	Phil Salt	Travis Head	Sophia Gardens, Cardiff	England by 3 wickets
T20I 2851a	15 September	Phil Salt	Mitchell Marsh	Old Trafford, Manchester	Match abandoned
ODI series
No.	Date	Home captain	Away captain	Venue	Result
ODI 4766	19 September	Harry Brook	Mitchell Marsh	Trent Bridge, Nottingham	Australia by 7 wickets
ODI 4770	21 September	Harry Brook	Mitchell Marsh	Headingley, Leeds	Australia by 68 runs
ODI 4775	24 September	Harry Brook	Mitchell Marsh	Riverside Ground, Chester-le-Street	England by 46 runs (DLS)
ODI 4778	27 September	Harry Brook	Mitchell Marsh	Lord's, London	England by 186 runs
ODI 4779	29 September	Harry Brook	Steve Smith	Bristol County Ground, Bristol	Australia by 49 runs (DLS)

== See also ==
- Associate international cricket in 2024
