= Sikh Union Club Ground =

Cricket ground

Sikh Union Club
Ground information
- Location: Nairobi, Kenya
- Establishment: 1933/34
- Tenants: Kenya national cricket team
- End names
- n/a n/a

International information
- First T20I: 28 June 2024: Malawi v Rwanda
- Last T20I: 18 October 2024: Kenya v Seychelles
- First WT20I: 10 September 2024: Kenya v Rwanda
- Last WT20I: 13 September 2024: Kenya v Rwanda
- As of 18 October 2024; Source: Ground profile

Sikh Union Club Ground is an international cricket ground in Nairobi, Kenya.

The ground hosted its first T20I in June 2024.
