= Smlednik =

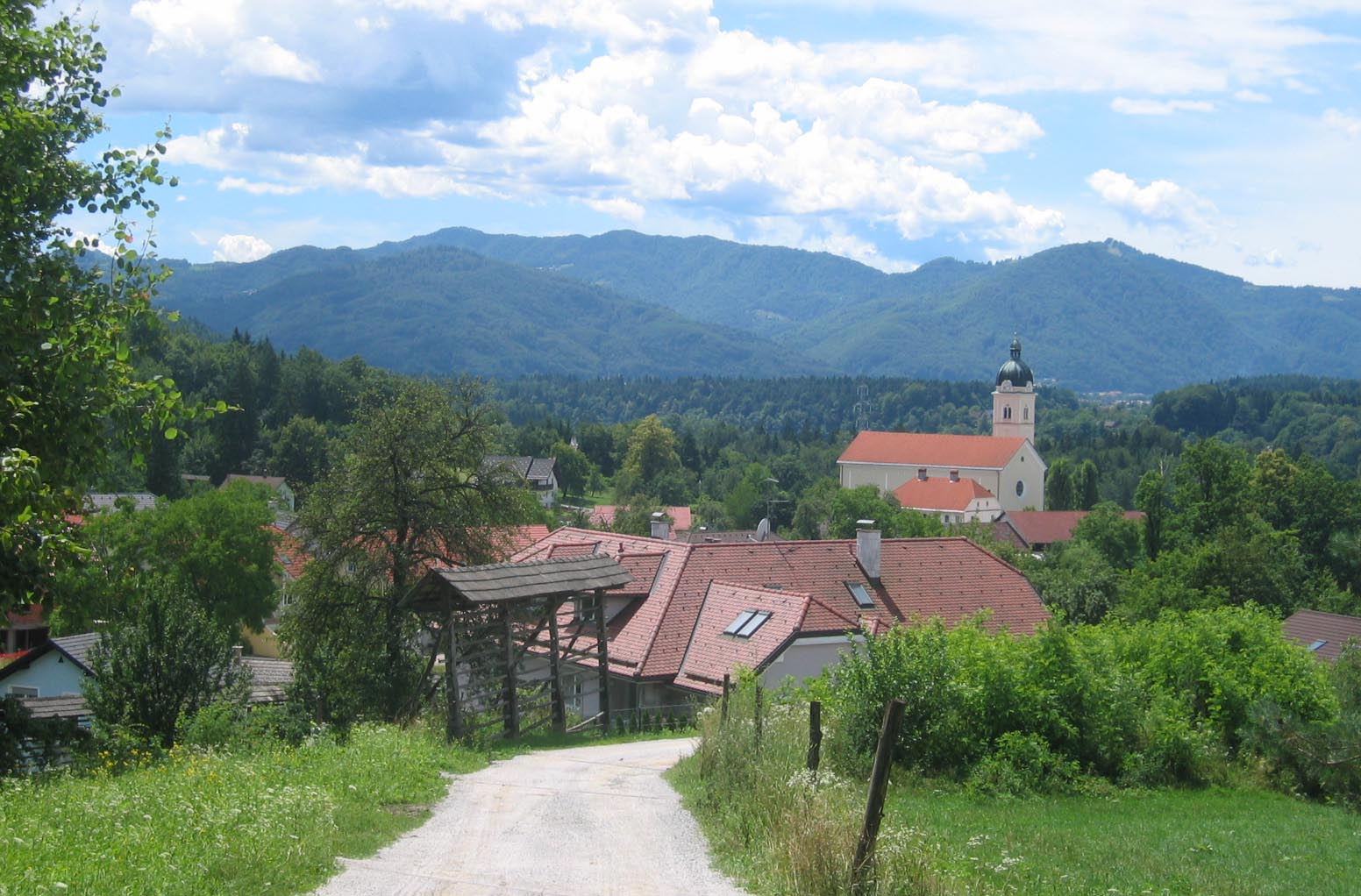

- Location in Slovenia
- Coordinates: 46°9′47.35″N 14°25′50.3″E
- Country: Slovenia
- Traditional region: Upper Carniola
- Statistical region: Central Slovenia
- Municipality: Medvode

Area
  - Total: 6.37 km^{2} (2.46 sq mi)
- Elevation: 349.3 m (1,146 ft)

Population (2002)
  - Total: 413

Smlednik (pronounced [ˈsmleːdnik]; German: Flödnig) is a village on the left bank of the Sava River in the Municipality of Medvode in the Upper Carniola region of Slovenia.

Smlednik is the site of the 18-hole Diners Golf Ljubljana golf course. It can accommodate up to 120 players at the same time.

== Name ==
Smlednik was attested in written sources in 1136 as Fledinich (and as Vlednich in 1214 and Vlednic in 1228). The origin of the name is unclear. A possible derivation is from the common noun smled 'hog's fennel', referring to the local vegetation. Other explanations include the obsolete Slovene common noun smled 'watchpost', or the root *mlědъ 'deciduous woods' or 'sparse woods', but neither of these is linguistically convincing. In the past the German name was Flödnig.

== Church ==
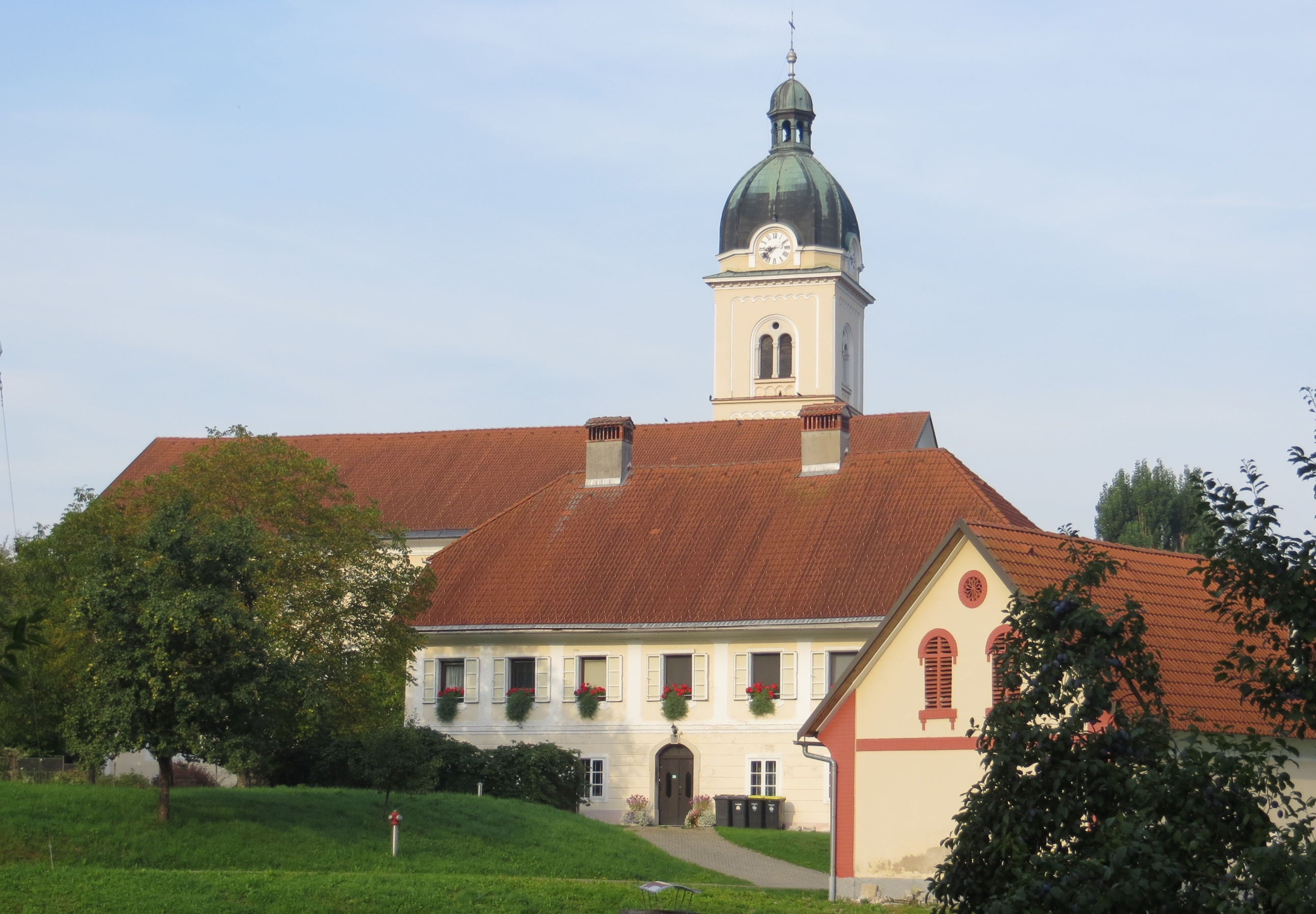
Saint Ulrich's Church

The parish church in the settlement is dedicated to Saint Ulrich (Slovene: Sveti Urh).
