= 2025 Women's T20 World Cup EAP Qualifier =

Qualifying tournament for 2026 Women's T20 World Cup

2025 Women's T20 World Cup East Asia-Pacific Qualifier
- Dates: 9 – 15 September 2025
- Administrator: ICC East Asia-Pacific
- Cricket format: Twenty20 International
- Tournament format(s): Group round-robin and playoffs
- Host: Fiji
- Champions: Papua New Guinea
- Runners-up: Vanuatu
- Participants: 8
- Matches: 20
- Most runs: (Vanuatu) Rachel Andrew (267)
- Most wickets: (Samoa) Regina Lili'i (9) (Papua New Guinea) Pauke Siaka (9)

The 2025 ICC Women's T20 World Cup East Asia-Pacific Qualifier was a cricket tournament that formed part of the qualification process for the 2026 Women's T20 World Cup. The tournament was hosted by Fiji in September 2025. Papua New Guinea won the tournament and advanced to the Global Qualifier.

== Squads ==
Cook Islands	Fiji	Indonesia	Japan	Papua New Guinea	Philippines	Samoa	Vanuatu
Gabby Sullivan (c); Tetiare Mataora (vc); Rachel Auora; Roma Bowers-Fleming; Taiora Elikana; Zamera Ikiua; Daena Kataina (wk); Lily Lamb; Tailor Maika; Koitai Mataora (wk); Sofia Samuels; Sonnia Vaia (wk); Aketa Vailoa; Esther Williams	Ilisapeci Waqavakatoga (c, wk); Kiera Amoe; Melaia Biu; Maeavhanisi Erasito (wk); Ana Gonerara; Silvia Kijiana; Akosita Levaci; Semaema Lomani; Jasvil Rokoro; Tabatha Saville; Serafina Sigaiwasa; Karalaini Vakuruivalu; Sulia Vuni (wk); Mele Waqanisau	Ni Wayan Sariani (c, wk); Fatimah Albanjari; Ni Ariani; Maria Corazon (wk); Ni Luh Dewi; Kisi Kasse; Sang Maypriani; Rahmawati Pangestuti; Dara Paramitha; Lie Qiao; Ni Kadek Fitria Rada Rani; Ni Putu Ayu Nanda Sakarini (wk); Emily Sirs; Ni Made Putri Suwandewi; Desi Wulandari	Mai Yanagida (c); Akari Nishimura (vc, wk); Ahilya Chandel; Ayumi Fujikawa; Hinase Goto; Haruna Iwasaki; Shimako Kato; ~~Ayaka Kato-Stafford~~; Mamta Kaswan; Elena Kusuda-Nairn; Erika Oda; Kurumi Ota; Seika Sumi; Erika Toguchi-Quinn; Nonoha Yasumoto	Brenda Tau (c, wk); Melanie Ani; Hollan Doriga; Dika Lohia; Konio Oala; Erani Pokana; Lakshmi Rajadurai; Pauke Siaka; Hane Tau; Henao Thomas; Geua Tom (wk); Mairi Tom; Isabel Toua; Naoani Vare	Katie Donovan (c); Alex Smith (vc); Jhon Andreano; Ma Luz Barcelona; Angela Busa; Reyven Castillo; Karri Keen; Kyte Keen; Jomae Masaya; Jessica Medianesta (wk); Simran Sirah; Ashley Miranda; Marica Taira; Amelia Valdez	Regina Lili'i (c); Carol Agafili; Ailaoa Aoina; Taalili Iosefo; Olive Lefaga; Leitu Leong; Jane Manase; Avetia Mapu; Leutu Mataafa; Kolotita Nonu; Norah Salima; Tuaoloa Semau; Fa'aiuga Sisifo; Angel Sootaga (wk)	Rachel Andrew (c); Alvina Chilia (vc); Gillian Chilia (wk); Melissa Fare; Anna Griffin; Natalia Kakor; Valenta Langiatu; Vicky Mansale; Nasimana Navaika; Rayline Ova; Selina Solman; Susan Stephen (wk); Mahina Tarimiala (wk); Vanessa Vira

Ayaka Kato-Stafford was replaced by Mamta Kaswan in Japan's squad after the former was selected for the Australian under-19 team.

== Fiji v Japan series ==
Japan women's cricket team in Fiji in 2025
	Fiji	Japan
- Dates: 5 – 6 September 2025
Captains	Ilisapeci Waqavakatoga	Mai Yanagida

Twenty20 International series
- Results: Japan won the 2-match series 2–0
Most runs	Serafina Sigaiwasa (30)	Mai Yanagida (53)
Most wickets	Akosita Levaci (3)	Erika Toguchi-Quinn (6)

Ahead of the qualifier, the hosts Fiji played a two-match Twenty20 International (T20I) series against Japan.

=== 1st T20I ===
5 September 2025
14:00
Scorecard

Japan; 120 (20 overs)	v	Fiji; 97/7 (20 overs)
Shimako Kato 21 (27); Serafina Sigaiwasa 2/6 (3 overs)		Melaia Biu 26* (17); Mai Yanagida 2/12 (2 overs)

Japan won by 23 runs
Albert Park Ground 1, Suva
Umpires: Iliesa Navatu (Fij) and Tomasi Nawaciono (Fij)
Player of the match: Serafina Sigaiwasa (Fij)

- Japan won the toss and elected to bat.

=== 2nd T20I ===
6 September 2025
10:00
Scorecard

Japan; 155/5 (20 overs)	v	Fiji; 51 (12.3 overs)
Mai Yanagida 43 (37); Akosita Levaci 2/21 (3 overs)		Ilisapeci Waqavakatoga 14 (21); Erika Toguchi-Quinn 5/6 (3.3 overs)

Japan won by 104 runs
Albert Park Ground 1, Suva

- Japan won the toss and elected to bat.
- Mamta Kaswan (Jpn) made her T20I debut.

=== Other preparations ===
Indonesia played a three-match series against Western Australia to prepare for the qualifiers, which they won by a 3–0 margin.

== Group stage ==
=== Group A ===
==== Points table ====
Pos	Team	Pld	W	L	NR	Pts	NRR	Qualification
1	Papua New Guinea	3	2	1	0	4	3.333	Advanced to the semi-finals
2	Japan	3	2	1	0	4	2.283	Advanced to the semi-finals
3	Samoa	3	2	1	0	4	0.156	Advanced to the play-offs
4	Philippines	3	0	3	0	0	−6.756	Advanced to the play-offs

Source: ESPNcricinfo

==== Fixtures ====
9 September 2025
09:30
Scorecard

Papua New Guinea; 139/4 (20 overs)	v	Japan; 93 (19.5 overs)
Konio Oala 50 (39); Shimako Kato 2/16 (2 overs)		Haruna Iwasaki 31 (17); Isabel Toua 3/8 (3.5 overs)

Papua New Guinea won by 46 runs
Albert Park Ground 2, Suva
Umpires: Kim Cotton (NZ) and Suresh Subramanian (Idn)
Player of the match: Konio Oala (PNG)

- Papua New Guinea won the toss and elected to bat.

9 September 2025
13:30
Scorecard

Philippines; 42 (17.3 overs)	v	Samoa; 43/1 (6.2 overs)
Karri Keen 15 (10); Regina Lili'i 3/3 (3.3 overs)		Angel Sootaga 16* (12); Karri Keen 1/23 (3 overs)

Samoa won by 9 wickets
Albert Park Ground 2, Suva
Umpires: Adam Birss (Jpn) and Merielle Kenni (Van)
Player of the match: Taalili Iosefo (Sam)

- Samoa won the toss and elected to field.

10 September 2025
09:30
Scorecard

Japan; 133/5 (20 overs)	v	Samoa; 62 (13.5 overs)
Mai Yanagida 40 (36); Taalili Iosefo 2/28 (4 overs)		Angel Sootaga 11 (8); Nonoha Yasumoto 4/11 (4 overs)

Japan won by 71 runs
Albert Park Ground 1, Suva
Umpires: Merielle Kenni (Van) and Suresh Subramanian (Idn)
Player of the match: Mai Yanagida (Jpn)

- Samoa won the toss and elected to field.

10 September 2025
13:30
Scorecard

Papua New Guinea; 224/1 (20 overs)	v	Philippines; 56 (19.4 overs)
Konio Oala 130* (66); Reyven Castillo 1/34 (4 overs)		Karri Keen 19 (29); Pauke Siaka 5/1 (3.4 overs)

Papua New Guinea won by 168 runs
Albert Park Ground 1, Suva
Umpires: Cory Black (NZ) and Merielle Kenni (Van)
Player of the match: Konio Oala (PNG)

- Philippines won the toss and elected to field.
- Konio Oala became the first player for Papua New Guinea to score a century in women's T20Is.
- Pauke Siaka (PNG) took her first five-wicket haul in T20Is.

12 September 2025
09:30
Scorecard

Japan; 158/4 (20 overs)	v	Philippines; 47 (16.1 overs)
Kurumi Ota 57* (40); Kyte Keen 2/38 (4 overs)		Amelia Valdez 16 (16); Kurumi Ota 2/3 (2.1 overs)

Japan won by 111 runs
Albert Park Ground 2, Suva
Umpires: Koita Atai (PNG) and Merielle Kenni (Van)
Player of the match: Kurumi Ota (Jpn)

- Philippines won the toss and elected to field.

12 September 2025
13:30
Scorecard

Samoa; 120/9 (20 overs)	v	Papua New Guinea; 107 (19.3 overs)
Regina Lili'i 43 (41); Henao Thomas 3/19 (4 overs); Mairi Tom 3/19 (4 overs)		Hane Tau 17* (22); Ailaoa Aoina 3/24 (4 overs)

Samoa won by 13 runs
Albert Park Ground 2, Suva
Umpires: Kim Cotton (NZ) and Suresh Subramanian (Idn)
Player of the match: Regina Lili'i (Sam)

- Samoa won the toss and elected to bat.

=== Group B ===
==== Points table ====
Pos	Team	Pld	W	L	NR	Pts	NRR	Qualification
1	Vanuatu	3	3	0	0	6	2.254	Advanced to the semi-finals
2	Indonesia	3	2	1	0	4	2.583	Advanced to the semi-finals
3	Fiji	3	1	2	0	2	−1.953	Advanced to the play-offs
4	Cook Islands	3	0	3	0	0	−3.052	Advanced to the play-offs

Source: ESPNcricinfo

==== Fixtures ====
9 September 2025
09:30
Scorecard

Cook Islands; 114/6 (20 overs)	v	Fiji; 115/1 (17.2 overs)
Gabby Sullivan 21 (27); Ilisapeci Waqavakatoga 2/10 (4 overs)		Sulia Vuni 44* (44); Aketa Vailoa 1/31 (3 overs)

Fiji won by 9 wickets
Albert Park Ground 1, Suva
Umpires: Koita Atai (PNG) and Cory Black (NZ)
Player of the match: Sulia Vuni (Fij)

- Fiji won the toss and elected to field.
- Tabatha Saville (Fij) made her T20I debut.

9 September 2025
13:30
Scorecard

Vanuatu; 131/2 (20 overs)	v	Indonesia; 121/8 (20 overs)
Rachel Andrew 85* (71); Dara Paramitha 1/14 (2 overs)		Maria Corazon 40 (34); Rachel Andrew 3/10 (4 overs)

Vanuatu won by 10 runs
Albert Park Ground 1, Suva
Umpires: Koita Atai (PNG) and Kim Cotton (NZ)
Player of the match: Rachel Andrew (Van)

- Indonesia won the toss and elected to field.
- Rachel Andrew (Van) scored her 1,000th run and took her first hat-trick in T20Is.

10 September 2025
09:30
Scorecard

Indonesia; 143/6 (20 overs)	v	Fiji; 101 (19.3 overs)
Ni Putu Ayu Nanda Sakarini 44 (47); Silvia Kijiana 2/15 (4 overs)		Tabatha Saville 33 (23); Ni Made Putri Suwandewi 2/19 (3 overs)

Indonesia won by 42 runs
Albert Park Ground 2, Suva
Umpires: Adam Birss (Jpn) and Cory Black (NZ)
Player of the match: Ni Putu Ayu Nanda Sakarini (Idn)

- Fiji won the toss and elected to field.

10 September 2025
13:30
Scorecard

Cook Islands; 118/1 (20 overs)	v	Vanuatu; 122/3 (15.1 overs)
Zamera Ikiua 52* (53); Vanessa Vira 1/24 (3 overs)		Valenta Langiatu 45 (30); Aketa Vailoa 1/2 (1 over)

Vanuatu won by 7 wickets
Albert Park Ground 2, Suva
Umpires: Koita Atai (PNG) and Suresh Subramanian (Idn)
Player of the match: Zamera Ikiua (Cok)

- Cook Islands won the toss and elected to bat.

12 September 2025
09:30
Scorecard

Indonesia; 170/4 (20 overs)	v	Cook Islands; 50 (13.2 overs)
Desi Wulandari 54* (54); Zamera Ikiua 2/30 (4 overs)		Gabby Sullivan 11 (12); Ni Luh Dewi 2/9 (3 overs)

Indonesia won by 120 runs
Albert Park Ground 1, Suva
Umpires: Adam Birss (Jpn) and Kim Cotton (NZ)
Player of the match: Ni Luh Dewi (Idn)

- Cook Islands won the toss and elected to field.

12 September 2025
13:30
Scorecard

Vanuatu; 149/3 (20 overs)	v	Fiji; 60 (17.5 overs)
Rachel Andrew 42 (34); Ilisapeci Waqavakatoga 1/25 (4 overs)		Maeavhanisi Erasito 11* (18); Vicky Mansale 4/15 (4 overs)

Vanuatu won by 89 runs
Albert Park Ground 1, Suva
Umpires: Adam Birss (Jpn) and Cory Black (NZ)
Player of the match: Vicky Mansale (Van)

- Vanuatu won the toss and elected to bat.

== Play-offs ==
5th place semi-final 1
13 September 2025
09:00
Scorecard

Samoa; 174/4 (20 overs)	v	Cook Islands; 112/6 (20 overs)
Regina Lili'i 46 (30); Lily Lamb 2/25 (3 overs)		Zamera Ikiua 48 (50); Taalili Iosefo 2/19 (4 overs); Olive Lefaga 2/19 (4 overs)

Samoa won by 62 runs
Albert Park Ground 1, Suva
Umpires: Cory Black (NZ) and Merielle Kenni (Van)
Player of the match: Regina Lili'i (Sam)

- Samoa won the toss and elected to bat.

5th place semi-final 2
13 September 2025
09:00
Scorecard

Philippines; 68/9 (20 overs)	v	Fiji; 69/2 (14 overs)
Alex Smith 11 (14); Ana Gonerara 3/9 (4 overs)		Mele Waqanisau 21* (21); Alex Smith 2/21 (3 overs)

Fiji won by 8 wickets
Albert Park Ground 2, Suva
Umpires: Koita Atai (PNG) and Adam Birss (Jpn)
Player of the match: Mele Waqanisau (Fij)

- Fiji won the toss and elected to field.

7th place-play-off
15 September 2025
09:30
Scorecard

Cook Islands; 115/6 (20 overs)	v	Philippines; 116/6 (19.4 overs)
Sonnia Vaia 22 (20); Karri Keen 3/17 (4 overs)		Katie Donovan 31 (27); Gabby Sullivan 3/9 (4 overs)

Philippines won by 4 wickets
Albert Park Ground 2, Suva
Umpires: Koita Atai (PNG) and Kim Cotton (NZ)
Player of the match: Katie Donovan (Phi)

- Cook Islands won the toss and elected to bat.

5th place play-off
15 September 2025
09:30
Scorecard

Samoa; 74 (12.3 overs)	v	Fiji; 75/5 (13.5 overs)
Avetia Mapu 29 (19); Ilisapeci Waqavakatoga 3/26 (3 overs)		Sulia Vuni 23* (32); Regina Lili'i 3/11 (4 overs)

Fiji won by 5 wickets
Albert Park Ground 1, Suva
Umpires: Adam Birss (Jpn) and Suresh Subramanian (Idn)
Player of the match: Ilisapeci Waqavakatoga (Fij)

- Samoa won the toss and elected to bat.

== Finals ==
Semi-final 1
13 September 2025
13:30
Scorecard

Indonesia; 134/3 (20 overs)	v	Papua New Guinea; 136/5 (19.3 overs)
Maria Corazon 56 (47); Mairi Tom 1/19 (3 overs)		Brenda Tau 52* (42); Ni Ariani 2/28 (3.3 overs)

Papua New Guinea won by 5 wickets
Albert Park Ground 1, Suva
Umpires: Kim Cotton (NZ) and Merielle Kenni (Van)
Player of the match: Brenda Tau (PNG)

- Indonesia won the toss and elected to bat.

Semi-final 2
13 September 2025
13:30
Scorecard

Vanuatu; 156/1 (20 overs)	v	Japan; 134/6 (20 overs)
Rachel Andrew 72* (59); Erika Toguchi-Quinn 1/31 (4 overs)		Mai Yanagida 27 (30); Rayline Ova 3/18 (4 overs)

Vanuatu won by 22 runs
Albert Park Ground 2, Suva
Umpires: Cory Black (NZ) and Suresh Subramanian (Idn)
Player of the match: Rachel Andrew (Van)

- Vanuatu won the toss and elected to bat.

3rd place play-off
15 September 2025
13:30
Scorecard

Japan; 125/7 (20 overs)	v	Indonesia; 128/2 (16.4 overs)
Mai Yanagida 67 (50); Ni Putri Suwandewi 2/20 (4 overs)		Maria Corazon 74* (52); Nonoha Yasumoto 2/18 (3 overs)

Indonesia won by 8 wickets
Albert Park Ground 2, Suva
Umpires: Cory Black (NZ) and Merielle Kenni (Van)
Player of the match: Maria Corazon (Idn)

- Japan won the toss and elected to bat.

Final
15 September 2025
13:30
Scorecard

Vanuatu; 113/9 (20 overs)	v	Papua New Guinea; 114/1 (15.1 overs)
Rachel Andrew 45 (26); Geua Tom 3/15 (3 overs)		Naoani Vare 57* (47); Vanessa Vira 1/21 (3.1 overs)

Papua New Guinea won by 9 wickets
Albert Park Ground 1, Suva
Umpires: Kim Cotton (NZ) and Suresh Subramanian (Idn)
Player of the match: Naoani Vare (PNG)

- Vanuatu won the toss and elected to bat.
