= Indonesia women's cricket team in the Philippines in 2019–20 =

International cricket tour

	Philippines	Indonesia
- Dates: 21 – 22 December 2019
Captains	Josie Arimas	Yulia Anggraeni

Twenty20 International series
- Results: Indonesia won the 4-match series 4–0
Most runs	Jona Eguid (19)	Yulia Anggraeni (117)
Most wickets	Jhon Andreano (2)	Ni Kadek Fitria Rada Rani (9)

The Indonesia women's cricket team toured the Philippines to play four Twenty20 International (T20I) matches from 21 to 22 December 2019. Originally the tour was scheduled to be a tri-series, but Bahrain withdrew prior to the series. The matches were played at the Friendship Oval ground at the Cavite campus in Emilio Aguinaldo College in the city of Dasmariñas.

The Philippines played their first women's T20I matches since the announcement by the International Cricket Council (ICC) of all official Twenty20 (T20) matches played between women's teams of associate members after 1 July 2018 having full T20I status. Eight of the cricketers in Philippines' squad were selected from Hong Kong's SCC Divas cricket team.

Indonesia won the series 4–0, with opening batters Yulia Anggraeni and Kadek Winda Prastini setting a world record women's T20I partnership of 257 runs in the second game.

== Squads ==
Philippines	Indonesia
Josie Arimas (c); Roda Abaya; Jennifer Alumbro; Jhon Andreano; April Angeles; Shanilyn Asis; Catherine Bagaoisan (wk); Jona Eguid; Ma Enego; Christine Lovino; Ma Mandia; Johannah McCall (wk); Cherry Octivano (wk); Romela Osabel; Rosaly Pagarigan; Corinne Sarabia; Camille Siena	Yulia Anggraeni (c, wk); Andriani (wk); Anak Bastari; Edenyce Eduard; Taskia Hanum; Jantralia; Rahmawati Pangestuti; Dara Paramitha; Ni Kadek Fitria Rada Rani; Ni Putu Ayu Nanda Sakarini (wk); Ni Wayan Sariani (wk); Ni Made Putri Suwandewi; Kadek Winda Prastini; Yuliana

== T20I series ==
=== 1st T20I ===
21 December 2019
09:30
Scorecard

Philippines; 15 (11 overs)	v	Indonesia; 16/0 (1.4 overs)
Josie Arimas 3 (8); Dara Paramitha 5/5 (3 overs)		Yulia Anggraeni 5* (7)

Indonesia won by 10 wickets
Friendship Oval, Dasmariñas
Umpires: Jason Long (Phi) and Hitesh Sharma (Phi)

- Philippines won the toss and elected to bat.
- Jennifer Alumbro, Jhon Andreano, April Angeles, Josie Arimas, Jona Eguid, Christine Lovino, Ma Mandia, Johannah McCall, Cherry Octivano, Romela Osabel, Corinne Sarabia (Phi), Jantralia and Dara Paramitha (Idn) all made their T20I debuts.

=== 2nd T20I ===
21 December 2019
13:30
Scorecard

Indonesia; 260/1 (20 overs)	v	Philippines; 78 (18.5 overs)
Yulia Anggraeni 112 (68); Romela Osabel 1/42 (3 overs)		Jona Eguid 15 (26); Andriani 4/10 (4 overs)

Indonesia won by 182 runs
Friendship Oval, Dasmariñas
Umpires: Jason Long (Phi) and Pankaj Patki (Phi)

- Indonesia won the toss and elected to bat.
- Roda Abaya, Catherine Bagaoisan, Camille Siena (Phi) and Rahmawati Pangestuti (Idn) all made their T20I debuts.
- The 257-run partnership between Yulia Anggraeni and Kadek Winda Prastini (Idn) was the highest for any wicket in women's T20Is.
- Yulia Anggraeni (Idn) scored her first century in T20Is.

=== 3rd T20I ===
22 December 2019
09:30
Scorecard

Indonesia; 217/2 (20 overs)	v	Philippines; 30 (14.5 overs)
Anak Basteri 80* (53); Jhon Andreano 2/40 (4 overs)		April Angeles 6 (45); Ni Made Putri Suwandewi 5/8 (4 overs)

Indonesia won by 187 runs
Friendship Oval, Dasmariñas
Umpires: Jason Long (Phi) and Pankaj Patki (Phi)

- Indonesia won the toss and elected to bat.

=== 4th T20I ===
22 December 2019
13:30
Scorecard

Philippines; 40 (14.1 overs)	v	Indonesia; 41/0 (3 overs)
Jhon Andreano 9 (23); Ni Wayan Sariani 4/5 (3.1 overs)		Rahmawati Pangestuti 22* (9)

Indonesia won by 10 wickets
Friendship Oval, Dasmariñas
Umpires: Pankaj Patki (Phi) and Hitesh Sharma (Phi)

- Indonesia won the toss and elected to field.
- Shanilyn Asis, Ma Enego and Rosaly Pagarigan (Phi) all made their T20I debuts.
