= Yulia Anggraeni =

Indonesian cricketer (born 1994)

Personal information
- Full name: Yulia Anggraeni
- Born: 10 July 1994 (age 32); Indonesia
- Batting: Right-handed
- Bowling: Right-arm medium-fast
- Role: All-rounder

International information
- National side: Indonesia
- T20I debut (cap 2): 12 January 2019 v Hong Kong
- Last T20I: 9 November 2022 v Singapore

Career statistics
Competition	WT20I
Matches	20
Runs scored	436
Batting average	27.25
100s/50s	1/1
Top score	112
Catches/stumpings	4/–
Medal record
Women's Cricket
Representing Indonesia
SEA Games
Gold medal – first place	2023 Cambodia	6s
Silver medal – second place	2017 Kuala Lumpur	Twenty20
- Source: Cricinfo, 24 November 2022

Yulia Anggraeni (born 10 July 1994) is an Indonesian cricketer who plays for the national cricket team as an all-rounder. She was the first player, male or female, to score a century for Indonesia in a Twenty20 International (T20I).

== Early life and education ==
As of 2020, Anggraeni was studying for a master's degree in Postgraduate Sports Education at the State University of Jakarta (UNJ).

== International career ==
Anggraeni was a member of the Indonesian team that emerged as runners-up to Thailand in the women's T20 tournament at the 2017 SEA Games, and played in the final. She was also a member of Indonesia's squad at the 2018 ASEAN Women's T20 Open Tournament in Thailand in March 2018, but the matches in that competition did not have full Women's Twenty20 International (WT20I) status.

On 12 January 2019, Anggraeni made her WT20I debut against Hong Kong at the Asian Institute of Technology Ground, Bangkok, in the first Group B match of the 2019 Thailand Women's T20 Smash, which was also Indonesia's first ever WT20I. When Myanmar played two T20Is against Indonesia in Bali during its tour of Singapore and Indonesia in April 2019, Anggraeni captained the Indonesia team to victory in both matches. In the 2019 ICC Women's Qualifier EAP, held in Vanuatu in May 2019, Anggraeni was the second highest run scorer, with a total of 104 runs in what was an impressive first appearance by Indonesia at an ICC Women's event.

On 21 December 2019, in the second match of a bilateral series between Indonesia and the Philippines at the Friendship Oval, Dasmariñas, Philippines, Anggraeni, who was again captaining Indonesia in the series, became the first player, male or female, to score a century for Indonesia in a T20I. She made 112, and also shared with Kadek Winda Prastini a first wicket partnership of 257 in 19.4 overs, the highest ever WT20I partnership for any wicket. Indonesia finished its innings with 260/1, the third highest ever T20I team total, men's or women's, and won the match by 182 runs.

== See also ==
- List of centuries in women's Twenty20 International cricket
- List of Indonesia women Twenty20 International cricketers
