= Natasha Ambo =

Papua New Guinean cricketer (born 1997)

Personal information
- Full name: Natasha Ambo
- Born: 9 November 1997 (age 29)
- Batting: Left-handed
- Bowling: Right-arm medium

International information
- National side: Papua New Guinea
- T20I debut (cap 13): 6 May 2019 v Vanuatu
- Last T20I: 5 September 2019 v Thailand
Medal record
Representing Papua New Guinea
Women's Cricket
Pacific Games
Silver medal – second place	2019 Apia	Twenty20 International
- Source: Cricinfo, 5 September 2019

Natasha Ambo (born 9 November 1997) is a Papua New Guinean cricketer. She was part of Papua New Guinea's squad for the 2018 ICC Women's World Twenty20 Qualifier tournament.

In April 2019, she was named in Papua New Guinea's squad for the 2019 ICC Women's Qualifier EAP tournament in Vanuatu. She made her Women's Twenty20 International (WT20I) debut for Papua New Guinea against Vanuatu in the Women's Qualifier EAP tournament on 6 May 2019. Later the same day, in Papua New Guinea's next match against Indonesia, she took her first five-wicket haul in WT20Is.

In August 2019, she was named in Papua New Guinea's squad for the 2019 ICC Women's World Twenty20 Qualifier tournament in Scotland. She played in Papua New Guinea's second match of the tournament, on 1 September 2019, against Scotland.
