= Tabatha Saville =

Australian cricketer

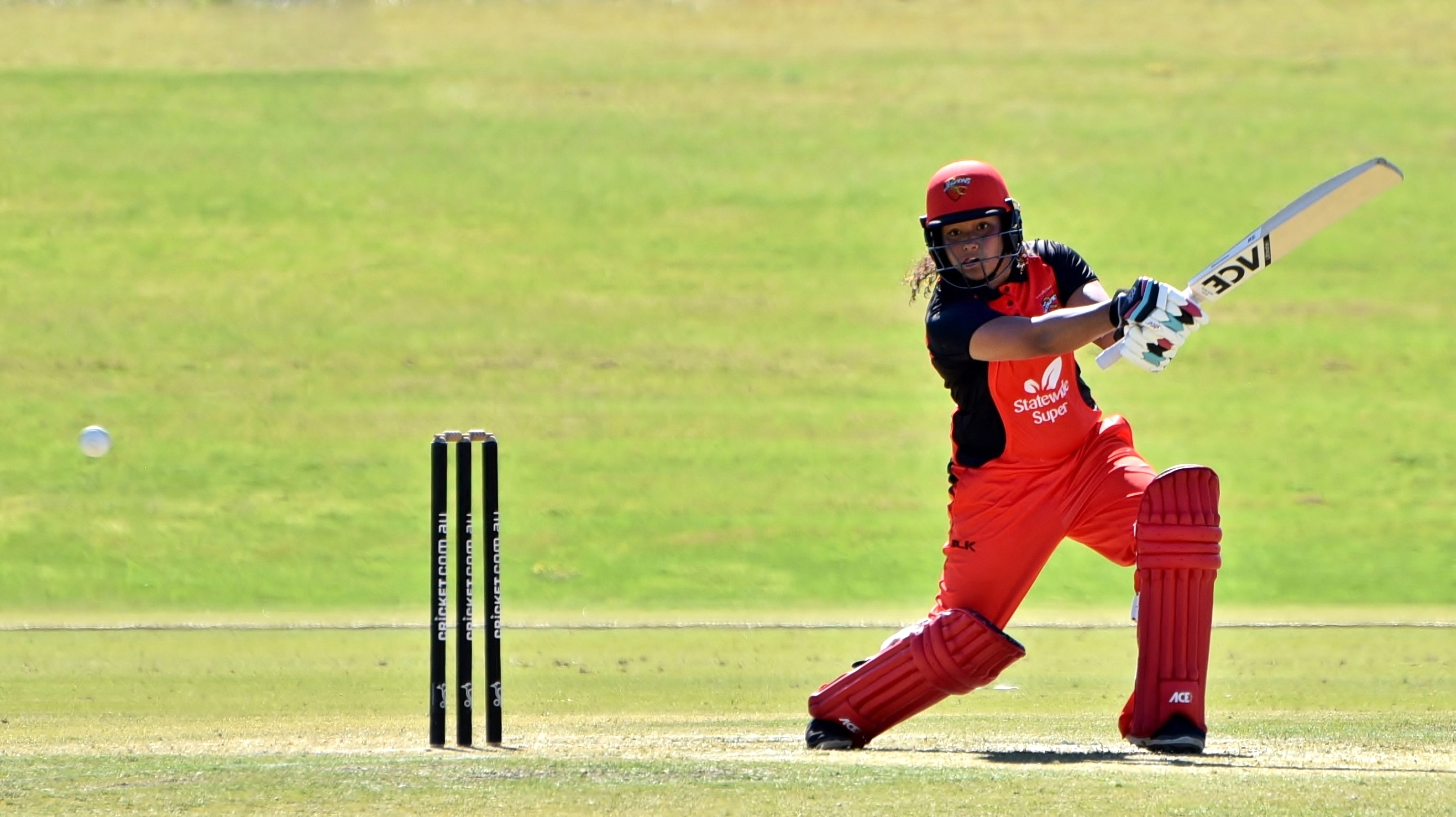
- Saville batting for the SA Scorpions

Personal information
- Full name: Tabatha Mary Shania Saville
- Born: 13 April 1998 (age 28); Suva, Fiji
- Batting: Right-handed
- Bowling: Right-arm medium
- Role: Batter

International information
- National side: Fiji
- T20I debut (cap 39): 9 September 2025 v Cook Islands
- Last T20I: 15 September 2025 v Samoa

Domestic team information
- Years: Team
- 2016/17–2018/19: Adelaide Strikers (squad no. 13)
- 2017/18–2018/19: South Australia
- 2023/24–present: Hobart Hurricanes
- 2023/24–present: Tasmania

Career statistics
Competition	T20I	LA	T20
Matches	5	24	49
Runs scored	60	501	373
Batting average	20.00	33.40	13.81
100s/50s	0/0	0/3	0/0
Top score	33	55	33
Balls bowled	–	67	–
Wickets	–	2	–
Bowling average	–	33.00	–
5 wickets in innings	–	0	–
10 wickets in match	–	0	–
Best bowling	–	2/8	–
Catches/stumpings	4/–	10/–	14/–
- Source: CricketArchive, 5 October 2025

Tabatha Mary Shania Saville (born 13 April 1998) is an Australian–Fijian cricketer who plays for Tasmania and Hobart Hurricanes. She currently plays for Fiji in international cricket.

Born in Suva, Fiji, Saville moved to Alice Springs, Northern Territory, Australia, at a young age. She developed her cricketing talents in the Northern Territory, and was often the only girl playing in the side. In early 2016, she was selected in Cricket Australia's Talent Squad after impressing at the under-18 National Championships, in which she represented South Australia.

Saville's potential was also recognised by South Australian Scorpions and Strikers coach Andrea McCauley. In the lead up to the WBBL|02 season (2016–17), she was added to the Adelaide Strikers' squad, as its youngest member. She made her debut for the Strikers on 2 January 2017 against the Sydney Sixers, and her first significant contribution to the match was the catch that dismissed star Sixers player Ellyse Perry.

In October 2017, Saville made her debut for South Australia in a WNCL match against the Western Fury. In November 2018, she was named in the Adelaide Strikers' squad for the 2018–19 Women's Big Bash League season.

While based in Adelaide, Saville is studying at university as well as playing cricket.
