= Zechariah Shem =

Vanuatuan cricketer (born 1994)

Personal information
- Full name: Zechariah Kalo Shem
- Born: 22 November 1994 (age 31)
- Batting: Right handed
- Bowling: Right-arm medium fast

International information
- National side: Vanuatu
- T20I debut (cap 12): 24 March 2019 v Philippines
- Last T20I: 4 October 2019 v Malaysia
- Source: Cricinfo, 4 October 2019

Zechariah Kalo Shem (born 22 November 1994) is a Vanuatuan cricketer who plays for the Vanuatu cricket team.

== Career ==
In March 2019, he was named in the Vanuatuan squad for the Regional Finals of the 2018–19 ICC T20 World Cup East Asia-Pacific Qualifier tournament. He made his Twenty20 International (T20I) debut against the Philippines on 24 March 2019.

Shem is also a cricket umpire, and was one of the on-field umpires in the second match of the 2019 ICC Women's Qualifier EAP tournament, between Japan women and Indonesia women in Vanuatu.

In June 2019, he was selected to represent the Vanuatu cricket team in the men's tournament at the 2019 Pacific Games. In September 2019, he was named in Vanuatu's squad for the 2019 Malaysia Cricket World Cup Challenge League A tournament. He made his List A debut against Singapore, in the Cricket World Cup Challenge League A tournament on 22 September 2019.
