= Philippines women's national cricket team =

Philippines
- Philippine Cricket Association logo
- Association: Philippine Cricket Association

Personnel
- Coach: Derek Budd

Team information
- Home venue: Friendship Oval, Dasmariñas, Cavite

International Cricket Council
- ICC status: Associate member (2017); Affiliate member (2000)
- ICC region: Asia / East Asia-Pacific
| ICC Rankings | Current | Best-ever |
| T20I | 71st | 51st (23-Dec-22) |

T20 Internationals
- First T20I: v. Indonesia at Friendship Oval, Dasmariñas; 21 December 2019
- Last T20I: v. United Arab Emirates at Bayuemas Oval, Pandamaran; 9 June 2026
| T20Is | Played | Won/Lost |
| Total | 38 | 6/31 (0 ties, 1 no result) |
| This year | 4 | 1/3 (0 ties, 0 no results) |
T20I kit
- As of 9 June 2026

The Philippines national women's cricket team is the team that represents the Philippines in international women's cricket. In April 2018, the International Cricket Council (ICC) granted full Women's Twenty20 International (WT20I) status to all its members. Therefore, all Twenty20 matches played between the Philippines women and other ICC members since 1 July 2018 have the full WT20I status.

The Philippine Cricket Association planned to form a women's national team as early as 2017 and managed to gather enough players to form such a team in 2019. The team played its first WT20I matches during a series against Indonesia from 21 to 22 December 2019.

In December 2020, the ICC announced the qualification pathway for the 2023 ICC Women's T20 World Cup. The Philippines women's team were scheduled to make their debut at an ICC women's event at the 2021 ICC Women's T20 World Cup EAP Qualifier group; however, in August 2021, the International Cricket Council (ICC) confirmed that the tournament had been cancelled due to the COVID-19 pandemic, and the Philippines did not enter the qualifier for the 2024 ICC Women's T20 World Cup. In December 2022, the Philippines toured Cambodia for a 6 match series, their first WT20I matches since their initial 2019 series against Indonesia, winning 1 out of the 6 matches (their first win in women's internationals), and 2023 saw the Philippines participate in the 2023 SEA Games cricket tournament, winning silver in sixes and T10.

== Records and statistics ==
International Match Summary — Philippines Women

Last updated 9 June 2026

Playing Record
| Format | M | W | L | T | NR | Inaugural Match |
| Twenty20 Internationals | 38 | 6 | 31 | 0 | 1 | 21 December 2019 |

=== Twenty20 International ===
T20I record versus other nations

Records complete to WT20I #2834. Last updated 9 June 2026.

| Opponent | M | W | L | T | NR | First match | First win |
|---|---|---|---|---|---|---|---|
vs Associate Members
| Cambodia | 6 | 1 | 5 | 0 | 0 | 21 December 2022 | 22 December 2022 |
| China | 3 | 0 | 3 | 0 | 0 | 4 June 2025 | |
| Cook Islands | 2 | 1 | 1 | 0 | 0 | 11 April 2025 | 15 September 2025 |
| Fiji | 1 | 0 | 1 | 0 | 0 | 13 September 2025 | |
| Indonesia | 6 | 0 | 6 | 0 | 0 | 21 December 2019 | |
| Japan | 2 | 0 | 2 | 0 | 0 | 7 June 2025 | |
| Malaysia | 2 | 0 | 2 | 0 | 0 | 6 May 2023 | |
| Mongolia | 2 | 2 | 0 | 0 | 0 | 6 June 2025 | 6 June 2025 |
| Myanmar | 1 | 0 | 1 | 0 | 0 | 11 May 2023 | |
| Oman | 1 | 0 | 1 | 0 | 0 | 7 June 2026 | |
| Papua New Guinea | 1 | 0 | 1 | 0 | 0 | 10 September 2025 | |
| Samoa | 1 | 0 | 1 | 0 | 0 | 9 September 2025 | |
| Saudi Arabia | 1 | 1 | 0 | 0 | 0 | 4 June 2026 | 4 June 2026 |
| Singapore | 7 | 1 | 5 | 0 | 1 | 27 December 2023 | 27 December 2024 |
| Thailand | 1 | 0 | 1 | 0 | 0 | 1 May 2023 | |
| United Arab Emirates | 1 | 0 | 1 | 0 | 0 | 9 June 2026 | |

== Tournament history ==
=== ICC Women's ODI World Cup ===
Women's Cricket World Cup records
| Host Year | Round | Position | GP | W | L | T | NR |
|---|---|---|---|---|---|---|---|
| (England) 1973 | Did not qualify/No Women's ODI status | | | | | | |
| (India) 1978 | Did not qualify/No Women's ODI status | | | | | | |
| (New Zealand) 1982 | Did not qualify/No Women's ODI status | | | | | | |
| (Australia) 1988 | Did not qualify/No Women's ODI status | | | | | | |
| (England) 1993 | Did not qualify/No Women's ODI status | | | | | | |
| (India) 1997 | Did not qualify/No Women's ODI status | | | | | | |
| (New Zealand) 2000 | Did not qualify/No Women's ODI status | | | | | | |
| (South Africa) 2005 | Did not qualify/No Women's ODI status | | | | | | |
| (Australia) 2009 | Did not qualify/No Women's ODI status | | | | | | |
| (India) 2013 | Did not qualify/No Women's ODI status | | | | | | |
| (England) 2017 | Did not qualify/No Women's ODI status | | | | | | |
| (New Zealand) 2022 | Did not qualify/No Women's ODI status | | | | | | |
| (India) 2025 | Did not qualify/No Women's ODI status | | | | | | |
| Total | 0/13 | 0 Titles | 0 | 0 | 0 | 0 | 0 |

=== ICC Women's Cricket World Cup Qualifier ===
ICC Women's Cricket World Cup Qualifier records
| Host Year | Round | Position | GP | W | L | T | NR |
|---|---|---|---|---|---|---|---|
| (Netherlands) 2003 | Did not qualify/No Women's ODI status | | | | | | |
| (South Africa) 2008 | Did not qualify/No Women's ODI status | | | | | | |
| (Bangladesh) 2011 | Did not qualify/No Women's ODI status | | | | | | |
| (Sri Lanka) 2017 | Did not qualify/No Women's ODI status | | | | | | |
| (Zimbabwe) 2021 | Did not qualify/No Women's ODI status | | | | | | |
| (Pakistan) 2025 | Did not qualify/No Women's ODI status | | | | | | |
| Total | 0/6 | 0 Title | 0 | 0 | 0 | 0 | 0 |

=== ICC Women's World T20 ===
Twenty20 World Cup records
| Host Year | Round | Position | GP | W | L | T | NR |
|---|---|---|---|---|---|---|---|
| (England) 2009 | Did not qualify | | | | | | |
| (Cricket West Indies) 2010 | Did not qualify | | | | | | |
| (Sri Lanka) 2012 | Did not qualify | | | | | | |
| (Bangladesh) 2014 | Did not qualify | | | | | | |
| (India) 2016 | Did not qualify | | | | | | |
| (Cricket West Indies) 2018 | Did not qualify | | | | | | |
| (Australia) 2020 | Did not qualify | | | | | | |
| (South Africa) 2023 | Did not qualify | | | | | | |
| (United Arab Emirates) 2024 | Did not qualify | | | | | | |
| (England) 2026 | To be determined | | | | | | |
| Total | 0/9 | 0 Titles | 0 | 0 | 0 | 0 | 0 |

=== ICC Women's Twenty20 Global Qualifier ===
ICC Women's World Twenty20 Qualifier records
| Host Year | Round | Position | GP | W | L | T | NR |
|---|---|---|---|---|---|---|---|
| (Republic of Ireland) 2013 | Did not qualify | | | | | | |
| (Thailand) 2015 | Did not qualify | | | | | | |
| (Netherlands) 2018 | Did not qualify | | | | | | |
| (Scotland) 2019 | Did not qualify | | | | | | |
| (United Arab Emirates) 2022 | Did not qualify | | | | | | |
| (United Arab Emirates) 2024 | Did not qualify | | | | | | |
| (Nepal) 2026 | To be determined | | | | | | |
| Total | 0/6 | 0 Titles | 0 | 0 | 0 | 0 | 0 |

=== Cricket at Summer Olympics Games ===
Cricket at Summer Olympics records
| Host Year | Round | Position | GP | W | L | T | NR |
|---|---|---|---|---|---|---|---|
| (United States) 2028 | To be determined | | | | | | |
| (Australia) 2032 | To be determined | | | | | | |
| Total | – | 0 Title | 0 | 0 | 0 | 0 | 0 |

=== ICC Women's T20 Champions Trophy ===
ICC Women's T20 Champions Trophy records
| Host Year | Round | Position | GP | W | L | T | NR |
|---|---|---|---|---|---|---|---|
| (Sri Lanka) 2027 | To be determined | | | | | | |
| 2031 | To be determined | | | | | | |
| Total | – | 0 Title | 0 | 0 | 0 | 0 | 0 |

=== ICC Women's Twenty20 World Cup East Asia Pacific Qualifier ===
ICC Women's Twenty20 World Cup Qualifier East Asia Pacific records
| Year | Round | Position | GP | W | L | T | NR |
|---|---|---|---|---|---|---|---|
| (Vanuatu) 2019 | Did not participate | | | | | | |
| (Samoa) 2021 | The tournament had been cancelled due to the COVID-19 pandemic | | | | | | |
| (Vanuatu) 2023 | Did not participate | | | | | | |
| (Fiji) 2025 | 7th-place | 7/8 | 5 | 1 | 4 | 0 | 0 |
| Total | 1/3 | 0 Titles | 5 | 1 | 4 | 0 | 0 |

== See also ==
- List of Philippines women Twenty20 International cricketers
