= Thailand women's cricket team in Papua New Guinea in 2026 =

International cricket tour

	Papua New Guinea	Thailand
- Dates: 10 August – 17 August 2026
Captains	Brenda Tau	Naruemol Chaiwai

One Day International series
- Results: Thailand won the 3-match series 3–0
Most runs	Pauke Siaka (90)	Naruemol Chaiwai (159)
Most wickets	Henao Thomas (7)	Onnicha Kamchomphu (8)

Twenty20 International series
- Results: 2-match series drawn 1–1
Most runs	Tanya Ruma (47)	Nannapat Koncharoenkai (76)
Most wickets	Isabel Toua (5)	Phannita Maya (3)

The Thailand women's cricket team toured Papua New Guinea in August 2026 to play two Twenty20 International (T20I) and three One Day International (ODI) matches. The matches were played at Amini Park in Port Moresby.

== Squads ==
Papua New Guinea	Thailand
Brenda Tau (c, wk); Pauke Siaka (vc); Vicky Buruka; Hollan Doriga; Kevau Gabe; Sibona Jimmy; Dika Lohia; Konio Oala; Tanya Ruma; Hane Tau; Henao Thomas; Geua Tom; Isabel Toua; Naoani Vare	Naruemol Chaiwai (c); Nannapat Chaihan; Natthakan Chantham; Sunida Chaturongrattana; Onnicha Kamchomphu; Nannapat Koncharoenkai (wk); Suleeporn Laomi; Phannita Maya; Chayanisa Phengpaen; Thipatcha Putthawong; Chanida Sutthiruang; Aphisara Suwanchonrathi; Koranit Suwanchonrathi

== T20I series ==
=== 1st T20I ===
10 August 2026
Scorecard

Thailand; 109/5 (20 overs)	v	Papua New Guinea; 110/5 (20 overs)
Phannita Maya 35 (45); Isabel Toua 3/13 (4 overs)		Konio Oala 26 (18); Onnicha Kamchomphu 1/11 (4 overs)

Papua New Guinea won by 5 wickets
Amini Park, Port Moresby
Umpires: Koita Atai (PNG) & Tabarak Dar (HK)
Player of the match: Isabel Toua (PNG)

- Thailand won the toss and elected to bat.

=== 2nd T20I ===
11 August 2026
Scorecard

Papua New Guinea; 87/9 (20 overs)	v	Thailand; 89/4 (18.2 overs)
Tanya Ruma 29 (34); Phannita Maya 3/9 (4 overs)		Nannapat Koncharoenkai 46 (50); Isabel Toua 2/13 (4 overs)

Thailand won by 6 wickets
Amini Park, Port Moresby
Umpires: Junius Ani (PNG) & Tabarak Dar (HK)
Player of the match: Phannita Maya (Tha)

- Papua New Guinea won the toss and elected to bat.

== ODI series ==
=== 1st ODI ===
13 August 2026
Scorecard

Thailand; 237/8 (50 overs)	v	Papua New Guinea; 116 (35.3 overs)
Naruemol Chaiwai 82 (98); Henao Thomas 2/31 (10 overs)		Tanya Ruma 29 (56); Onnicha Kamchomphu 3/15 (5.3 overs)

Thailand won by 121 runs
Amini Park, Port Moresby
Umpires: Koita Atai (PNG) & Tabarak Dar (HK)
Player of the match: Naruemol Chaiwai (Tha)

- Papua New Guinea won the toss and elected to field.
- Nannaphat Chaihan (Tha) made her ODI debut.

=== 2nd ODI ===
15 August 2026
Scorecard

Thailand; 191 (47.3 overs)	v	Papua New Guinea; 151 (46 overs)
Naruemol Chaiwai 61 (74); Pauke Siaka 4/18 (9.3 overs)		Henao Thomas 35 (70); Phannita Maya 3/16 (7 overs)

Thailand won by 40 runs
Amini Park, Port Moresby
Umpires: Junius Ani (PNG) and Tabarak Dar (HK)
Player of the match: Phannita Maya (Tha)

- Papua New Guinea won the toss and elected to field.

=== 3rd ODI ===
17 August 2026
Scorecard

Papua New Guinea; 122 (47 overs)	v	Thailand; 126/5 (27 overs)
Pauke Siaka 57* (76); Onnicha Kamchomphu 3/23 (10 overs)		Natthakan Chantham 48 (52); Henao Thomas 4/28 (6 overs)

Thailand won by 5 wickets
Amini Park, Port Moresby
Umpires: Koita Atai (PNG) and Tabarak Dar (HK)
Player of the match: Natthakan Chantham (PNG)

- Papua New Guinea won the toss and elected to bat.
