= Independence Park, Port Vila =

Cricket ground

Independence Park
Ground information
- Location: Port Vila, Vanuatu
- Coordinates: 17.74°S 168.317°E
- Owner: Vanuatu Cricket Association
- Operator: Vanuatu Cricket Association

International information
- First WT20I: 6 May 2019: Vanuatu v Papua New Guinea
- Last WT20I: 10 May 2019: Papua New Guinea v Samoa
- As of 6 October 2022; Source: CricketArchive Cricinfo

Independence Park is one of the main cricket grounds in Port Vila, in the Island nation of Vanuatu. It hosted the matches in the 2019 ICC Women's Qualifier EAP tournament in May 2019.
