= List of Cook Islands women Twenty20 International cricketers =

This is a list of Cook Islands women Twenty20 International cricketers. A Twenty20 International is an international cricket match between two representative teams, each having Twenty20 International status, as determined by the International Cricket Council (ICC). A Twenty20 International is played under the rules of Twenty20 cricket.

This list includes all players who have played at least one T20I match for Cook Islands and is arranged in the order of debut appearance. Where more than one player won their first cap in the same match, those players are initially listed alphabetically at the time of debut.

Cook Islands played their first women's T20I match against Japan on 1 September 2023 during the 2023 ICC Women's T20 World Cup EAP Qualifier.

== Key ==
General

- ‡ – Captain
- † – Wicket-keeper
- First – Year of debut
- Last – Year of latest game
- Mat – Number of matches played

Batting

- Runs – Runs scored in career
- HS – Highest score
- 50 – Number of half centuries
- Avg – Runs scored per dismissal
- * – Batter remained not out

Bowling

- Wkt – Wickets taken in career
- BBI – Best bowling in an innings
- Ave – Average runs per wicket

Fielding

- Ca – Catches taken
- St – Stumpings affected

== List of players ==
Statistics are correct as of 15 September 2025.

Cook Islands women T20I cricketers
| General | | | | | Batting | | | | Bowling | | | | Fielding | | Ref |
| No. | Name | First | Last | Mat | Runs | HS | Avg | 50 | Balls | Wkt | BBI | Ave | Ca | St | Ref |
|---|---|---|---|---|---|---|---|---|---|---|---|---|---|---|---|
| 1 | June George‡ | 2023 | 2023 | 6 | 34 | 11* | 6.80 | 0 | 108 | 2 | 1/19 | 68.00 | 1 | 0 | |
| 2 | Zamera Ikiua | 2024 | 2025 | 19 | 351 | 52* | 23.40 | 1 | 341 | 13 | 3/18 | 25.15 | 14 | 0 | |
| 3 | Daena Kataina | 2023 | 2025 | 10 | 61 | 17 | 7.62 | 0 | – | – | – | – | 2 | 0 | |
| 4 | Marii Kaukura | 2023 | 2023 | 6 | 40 | 10 | 8.00 | 0 | 120 | 6 | 3/24 | 21.83 | 0 | 0 | |
| 5 | Punanga Kaveao | 2023 | 2023 | 6 | 33 | 16* | 6.60 | 0 | 92 | 3 | 1/14 | 34.00 | 1 | 0 | |
| 6 | Tailor Maika† | 2023 | 2025 | 14 | 89 | 28 | 8.90 | 0 | – | – | – | – | 4 | 0 | |
| 7 | Phillica Maruariki | 2023 | 2023 | 6 | 53 | 36 | 10.60 | 0 | – | – | – | – | 0 | 0 | |
| 8 | Koitai Mataora† | 2023 | 2025 | 8 | 62 | 20 | 20.66 | 0 | 6 | 0 | – | – | 1 | 2 | |
| 9 | Tapuaiva Piakura | 2023 | 2024 | 8 | 22 | 10 | 4.40 | 0 | 3 | 0 | – | – | 0 | 0 | |
| 10 | Sofia Samuels | 2023 | 2025 | 15 | 24 | 9 | 3.42 | 0 | 235 | 10 | 3/19 | 23.70 | 1 | 0 | |
| 11 | Sonnia Vaia† | 2023 | 2025 | 19 | 151 | 23 | 10.78 | 0 | 156 | 5 | 2/21 | 27.60 | 8 | 2 | |
| 12 | Teraimateata Touna† | 2023 | 2023 | 4 | 4 | 2 | 2.00 | 0 | – | – | – | – | 0 | 0 | |
| 13 | Tina Mato | 2023 | 2023 | 2 | 6 | 5* | 6.00 | 0 | – | – | – | – | 0 | 0 | |
| 14 | Maya Piakura | 2023 | 2024 | 5 | 2 | 1* | 2.00 | 0 | – | – | – | – | 2 | 0 | |
| 15 | Rachel Auora | 2025 | 2025 | 12 | 28 | 16* | 4.00 | 0 | 186 | 5 | 2/14 | 40.40 | 0 | 0 | |
| 16 | Taiora Elikana | 2024 | 2025 | 10 | 7 | 4 | 1.75 | 0 | 125 | 3 | 1/11 | 51.00 | 2 | 0 | |
| 17 | Tetiare Mataora‡ | 2024 | 2025 | 12 | 131 | 49* | 16.37 | 0 | 126 | 4 | 2/24 | 40.00 | 0 | 0 | |
| 18 | Raupa Vila | 2024 | 2024 | 5 | 56 | 23 | 14.00 | 0 | 60 | 2 | 2/21 | 36.50 | 1 | 0 | |
| 19 | Esther Williams | 2024 | 2025 | 11 | 80 | 34* | 13.33 | 0 | 171 | 7 | 2/11 | 27.57 | 4 | 0 | |
| 20 | Ioane Evangelean | 2024 | 2024 | 2 | 0 | 0 | 0.00 | 0 | – | – | – | – | 1 | 0 | |
| 21 | Clara Cummings | 2025 | 2025 | 2 | 3 | 0 | 1.50 | 0 | – | – | – | – | 0 | 0 | |
| 22 | Mummy Elikana | 2025 | 2025 | 2 | 6 | 4 | 3.00 | 0 | – | – | – | – | 0 | 0 | |
| 23 | Ashleigh Katoa | 2025 | 2025 | 3 | 31 | 18 | 10.33 | 0 | – | – | – | – | 0 | 0 | |
| 24 | Gabby Sullivan‡ | 2025 | 2025 | 8 | 74 | 22 | 10.57 | 0 | 168 | 8 | 3/7 | 16.00 | 6 | 0 | |
| 25 | Aketa Vailoa | 2025 | 2025 | 6 | 0 | 0* | – | 0 | 96 | 9 | 4/8 | 11.00 | 1 | 0 | |
| 26 | Roma Bowers-Fleming | 2025 | 2025 | 4 | 1 | 1 | 1.00 | 0 | 6 | 1 | 1/9 | 9.00 | 3 | 0 | |
| 27 | Lily Lamb | 2025 | 2025 | 4 | – | – | – | – | 42 | 2 | 2/25 | 28.50 | 0 | 0 | |
