= List of Philippines women Twenty20 International cricketers =

This is a list of Philippines women Twenty20 International cricketers. A Twenty20 International is an international cricket match between two representative teams. A Twenty20 International (T20I) is played under the rules of Twenty20 cricket. In April 2018, the International Cricket Council (ICC) granted full international status to Twenty20 women's matches played between member sides from 1 July 2018 onwards. The Philippines women's team made their T20I debut on 21 December 2019 during a series against Indonesia.

The list is arranged in the order in which each player won her first Twenty20 International cap. Where more than one player won their first T20I caps in the same match, those players are listed alphabetically by surname.

== Key ==
General

- ‡ – Captain
- † – Wicket-keeper
- First – Year of debut
- Last – Year of latest game
- Mat – Number of matches played

Batting

- Runs – Runs scored in career
- HS – Highest score
- Avg – Runs scored per dismissal
- * – Batsman remained not out
- 50 – Number of half centuries

Bowling

- Wkt – Wickets taken in career
- BBI – Best bowling in an innings
- Ave – Average runs per wicket

Fielding

- Ca – Catches taken
- St – Stumpings affected

== Players ==
Last updated 9 June 2026.

Philippines women T20I cricketers
General					Batting				Bowling				Fielding		Ref
No.	Name	First	Last	Mat	Runs	HS	Avg	50	Balls	Wkt	BBI	Ave	Ca	St	Ref
1	Jennifer Alumbro	2019	2023	7	25	8	3.57	0	48	0	–	–	0	0	
2	Jhon Andreano	2019	2026	36	99	16	3.19	0	590	21	2/1	32.85	4	0	
3	April Angeles	2019	2019	2	6	6	6.00	0	18	0	–	–	0	0	
4	Josie Arimas‡	2019	2023	12	42	16	3.81	0	72	2	1/15	35.00	0	0	
5	Jona Eguid	2019	2025	16	45	15	3.21	0	55	3	3/18	23.00	0	0	
6	Christine Lovino	2019	2019	3	2	2	1.00	0	48	0	–	–	0	0	
7	Ma Luz Barcelona	2019	2026	14	12	4*	1.20	0	18	0	–	–	0	0	
8	Johannah McCall†	2019	2023	5	3	2	0.75	0	12	0	–	–	1	0	
9	Cherry Octivano†	2019	2019	3	8	8	2.66	0	–	–	–	–	0	0	
10	Romela Osabel	2019	2025	19	84	33*	5.60	0	204	8	2/29	33.75	0	0	
11	Corinne Sarabia	2019	2019	1	0	0	0.00	0	4	0	–	–	0	0	
12	Roda Abaya	2019	2019	3	2	1	0.66	0	12	0	–	–	0	0	
13	Catherine Bagaoisin‡†	2019	2023	14	50	13	3.57	0	6	0	–	–	0	0	
14	Camille Siena	2019	2019	1	2	2*	–	0	6	0	–	–	0	0	
15	Shanilyn Asis	2019	2023	2	0	0*	0.00	0	–	–	–	–	0	0	
16	Ma Enego	2019	2019	1	2	2	2.00	0	–	–	–	–	0	0	
17	Rosaly Pagarigan	2019	2019	1	0	0	0.00	0	–	–	–	–	0	0	
18	Sherlyn Agueran	2022	2022	3	5	5	1.66	0	36	3	2/12	10.00	1	0	
19	Joan Badillo	2022	2022	6	17	13	2.83	0	108	9	3/24	8.77	0	0	
20	Lolita Olagiure	2022	2023	8	18	5	4.50	0	102	9	2/6	7.44	0	0	
21	Riza Penalba†	2022	2024	9	24	11	2.66	0	42	0	–	–	0	0	
22	April Saquilon	2022	2023	11	51	23	4.63	0	–	–	–	–	0	0	
23	Simran Sirah	2022	2026	21	58	18	4.14	0	18	1	1/15	24.00	2	0	
24	Irshe Meu†	2022	2022	2	0	0	0.00	0	–	–	–	–	0	0	
25	Mericris Jordan	2022	2022	3	4	2*	2.00	0	–	–	–	–	0	0	
26	Eda Urdaneta	2022	2022	2	2	1	1.00	0	1	0	–	–	0	0	
27	Joelle Galapin	2023	2023	2	6	6	3.00	0	–	–	–	–	0	0	
28	Alex Smith	2023	2025	24	345	64	15.68	1	420	12	2/14	37.25	9	0	
29	Angela Busa	2023	2025	19	63	12*	4.20	0	112	2	1/13	88.00	1	0	
30	Arylyn Dacutan	2023	2023	2	2	1*	2.00	0	–	–	–	–	0	0	
31	Reyven Castillo	2023	2026	24	49	11*	4.45	0	280	10	3/26	36.60	1	0	
32	Alpha Arayan†	2023	2023	1	3	3	3.00	0	–	–	–	–	1	0	
33	Jomae Masaya	2023	2026	10	21	11*	7.00	0	–	–	–	–	0	0	
34	Marica Taira	2023	2025	3	1	1	0.50	0	6	–	–	–	1	0	
35	Katie Donovan‡	2024	2026	20	296	37	17.41	0	426	17	3/15	19.82	4	0	
36	Karri Gullem Keen	2024	2026	22	245	67*	15.31	0	374	22	3/4	16.86	1	0	
37	Kyte Gullem Keen	2024	2026	21	35	10*	3.50	0	174	11	4/21	19.45	3	0	
38	Jessica Medianesta†	2024	2026	19	25	11	4.16	0	–	–	–	–	2	5	
39	Ashley Miranda	2024	2025	14	31	11	3.10	0	–	–	–	–	1	0	
40	Amelia Valdez	2024	2026	21	286	54*	16.82	1	156	4	2/26	48.00	4	0	
41	Elyza Wall	2025	2026	6	36	20	6.00	0	–	–	–	–	0	0	
42	Kristine Wong	2025	2025	2	21	12*	–	0	30	1	1/46	56.00	1	0	
43	Zoe Isabela Wong†	2026	2026	4	21	16	5.25	0	–	–	–	–	1	1	

Note: Details of catchers for the series against Cambodia in December 2022 are missing from the ESPNcricinfo scorecards and hence the statistics.
