= Cook Islands women's national cricket team =

Cricket team

Cook Islands
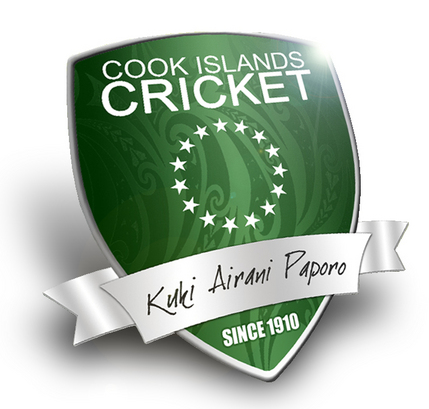
- Association: Cook Islands Cricket Association

Personnel
- Captain: Gabby Sullivan

International Cricket Council
- ICC status: Associate member (2017); Affiliate member (2000)
- ICC region: East Asia-Pacific
ICC Rankings	Current	Best-ever
T20I	61st	53rd (1 May 2024)

International cricket
- First international: v. Samoa at Port Vila, Vanuatu; 15 May 2012

T20 Internationals
- First T20I: v Japan at Vanuatu Cricket Ground, Port Vila; 1 September 2023
- Last T20I: v Philippines at Albert Park Ground 2, Suva; 15 September 2025
T20Is	Played	Won/Lost
Total	19	4/15 (0 ties, 0 no results)
This year	0	0/0 (0 ties, 0 no results)
T20I kit
- As of 15 September 2025

The Cook Islands women's national cricket team represents the Cook Islands, an associated state of New Zealand, in international women's cricket. It is organised by the sport's governing body in the country, the Cook Islands Cricket Association (CICA), which has been an affiliate member of the International Cricket Council (ICC) since 2000.

The Cook Islands made its international debut at the 2012 ICC East Asia-Pacific regional qualifiers for the World Twenty20, but lost every match, finishing last. They improved slightly at the 2014 edition, winning a single match (against Vanuatu) and placing fourth out of five teams. In April 2018, the ICC granted full Women's Twenty20 International (WT20I) status to all its members. Therefore, all Twenty20 matches played between the Cook Islands women and another international side since 1 July 2018 have been full WT20Is.

== History ==
Unlike in many other Pacific island countries, where women's cricket has been played alongside the men's game, women's cricket was only introduced to the Cook Islands in 2009. A high-performance program was established in the same year, with assistance from ICC East Asia-Pacific (EAP) and a New Zealand provincial governing body, the Northern Districts Cricket Association. The sport quickly gained in popularity amongst Cook Islander women, with significant numbers of clubs established in only a few years – in April 2014, it was reported that there were 600 female participants in the sport, out of a total population of 8,000 women. At the 2012 ICC EAP Development Programme Awards, the Cook Islands Cricket Association won the award for "Best Women's Cricket Initiative".

With earlier applications to participate in regional tournaments having been declined, the Cook Islands made its international debut at the 2012 EAP Women's Championship in Port Vila, Vanuatu. That tournament was played using the Twenty20 format, with the winner progressing to the 2013 World Twenty20 Qualifier in Ireland. The team joined the three sides from the 2010 tournament – Japan, Papua New Guinea, and Samoa – as well as Fiji and Vanuatu (also making their tournament debut). The Cook Islands lost all three of its group-stage matches by large margins, and eventually placed last after losing to Fiji in the fifth-place playoff. In the opening game against Samoa, they were bowled out for 36 from 12.1 overs, while against PNG they were all out for 47 from 17.3 overs.

In 2014, the Cook Islanders played several exhibition matches against club teams touring the islands from New Zealand, and were consequently invited to the 2014 EAP Women's Championship, despite their poor performance at the previous edition. The winner of that tournament was to qualify for the 2015 World Twenty20 Qualifier in Thailand. Despite fielding a young team, including four players under the age of 18, the Cook Islands dramatically improved upon its 2012 result, defeating Vanuatu in the fourth-place playoff by six wickets after bowling them out for 73. However, they were unable to win the subsequent third-place playoff against Samoa, and in the earlier group stages had lost all of their games. The Cook Islands' next major tournament is the women's event at the 2015 Pacific Games in Port Moresby.

In December 2020, the ICC announced the qualification pathway for the 2023 ICC Women's T20 World Cup. The Cook Islands were named in the 2021 ICC Women's T20 World Cup EAP Qualifier regional group, alongside seven other teams; however, due to COVID-19, the tournament did not go ahead. The Cook Islands have been named as participants in the 2023 ICC Women's T20 World Cup EAP Qualifier, which will mark their debut in an ICC pathway event.

== Tournament history ==
=== ICC Women's ODI World Cup ===
Women's Cricket World Cup records
Host Year	Round	Position	GP	W	L	T	NR
(England) 1973	Did not qualify/No Women's ODI status						
(India) 1978	Did not qualify/No Women's ODI status						
(New Zealand) 1982	Did not qualify/No Women's ODI status						
(Australia) 1988	Did not qualify/No Women's ODI status						
(England) 1993	Did not qualify/No Women's ODI status						
(India) 1997	Did not qualify/No Women's ODI status						
(New Zealand) 2000	Did not qualify/No Women's ODI status						
(South Africa) 2005	Did not qualify/No Women's ODI status						
(Australia) 2009	Did not qualify/No Women's ODI status						
(India) 2013	Did not qualify/No Women's ODI status						
(England) 2017	Did not qualify/No Women's ODI status						
(New Zealand) 2022	Did not qualify/No Women's ODI status						
(India) 2025	Did not qualify/No Women's ODI status						
Total	0/13	0 Titles	0	0	0	0	0

=== ICC Women's Cricket World Cup Qualifier ===
ICC Women's Cricket World Cup Qualifier records
Host Year	Round	Position	GP	W	L	T	NR
(Netherlands) 2003	Did not qualify/No ODI status						
(South Africa) 2008	Did not qualify/No ODI status						
(Bangladesh) 2011	Did not qualify/No ODI status						
(Sri Lanka) 2017	Did not qualify/No ODI status						
(Zimbabwe) 2021	Did not qualify/No ODI status						
(Pakistan) 2025	Did not qualify/No ODI status						
Total	0/6	0 Title	0	0	0	0	0

=== ICC Women's World T20 ===
Twenty20 World Cup records
Host Year	Round	Position	GP	W	L	T	NR
(England) 2009	Did not qualify						
(Cricket West Indies) 2010	Did not qualify						
(Sri Lanka) 2012	Did not qualify						
(Bangladesh) 2014	Did not qualify						
(India) 2016	Did not qualify						
(Cricket West Indies) 2018	Did not qualify						
(Australia) 2020	Did not qualify						
(South Africa) 2023	Did not qualify						
(United Arab Emirates) 2024	Did not qualify						
(England) 2026	To be determined						
Total	0/9	0 Titles	0	0	0	0	0

=== ICC Women's Twenty20 Global Qualifier ===
ICC Women's World Twenty20 Qualifier records
Host Year	Round	Position	GP	W	L	T	NR
(Republic of Ireland) 2013	Did not qualify						
(Thailand) 2015	Did not qualify						
(Netherlands) 2018	Did not qualify						
(Scotland) 2019	Did not qualify						
(United Arab Emirates) 2022	Did not qualify						
(United Arab Emirates) 2024	Did not qualify						
(Nepal) 2026	Did not qualify						
Total	0/7	0 Titles	0	0	0	0	0

=== Cricket at Summer Olympics Games ===
Cricket at Summer Olympics records
Host Year	Round	Position	GP	W	L	T	NR
(United States) 2028	To be determined						
(Australia) 2032	To be determined						
Total	–	0 Title	0	0	0	0	0

=== ICC Women's T20 Champions Trophy ===
ICC Women's T20 Champions Trophy records
Host Year	Round	Position	GP	W	L	T	NR
(Sri Lanka) 2027	To be determined						
2031	To be determined						
Total	–	0 Title	0	0	0	0	0

=== East Asia Pacific Women's Championship ===
East Asia Pacific Women's Championship records
Host/Year	Round	Position	GP	W	L	T	NR
(Japan) 2010	Did not qualify						
(Vanuatu) 2012	Round-robin	3l6/6	The full information of the tournament have not found				
(Japan) 2014	Round-robin	4/5	The full information of the tournament have not found				
(Samoa) 2016	Did not participate						
Total	2/4	0 Titles	0	0	0	0	0

=== Cricket at the Pacific Games ===
Pacific Games record
Year	Round	Position	GP	W	L	T	NR
(Papua New Guinea) 2015	Group stage	5/6	5	1	4	0	0
(Samoa) 2019	Did not participate						
Total	1/2	0 Titles	5	1	4	0	0

=== EAP Women's Twenty20 World Cup Qualifier ===
EAP Women's Twenty20 World Cup Qualifier records
Year	Round	Position	GP	W	L	T	NR
(Vanuatu) 2019	Runners-up	2/6	5	4	1	0	0
(Samoa) 2021	The tournament had been cancelled due to the COVID-19 pandemic						
(Vanuatu) 2023	Round-robin	5/7	6	1	5	0	0
(Fiji) 2025	8th-place	8/8	5	0	5	0	0
Total	3/3	0 Titles	16	5	11	0	0

== Records and statistics ==
International Match Summary — Cook Islands Women

Last updated 15 September 2025

Playing Record
Format	M	W	L	T	NR	Inaugural Match
Twenty20 Internationals	19	4	15	0	0	1 September 2023

=== Twenty20 International ===
T20I record versus other nations

Records complete to WT20I #2512. Last updated 15 September 2025.

Opponent	M	W	L	T	NR	First match	First win
ICC Associate members
Fiji	4	3	1	0	0	8 September 2023	8 September 2023
Indonesia	4	0	4	0	0	4 September 2023	
Japan	1	0	1	0	0	1 September 2023	
Papua New Guinea	2	0	2	0	0	2 September 2023	
Philippines	2	1	1	0	0	11 April 2025	11 April 2025
Samoa	3	0	3	0	0	7 September 2023	
Vanuatu	3	0	3	0	0	4 September 2023	

== See also ==
- List of Cook Islands women Twenty20 International cricketers
- Cook Islands men's national cricket team
