= Andriani (cricketer) =

Indonesian cricketer

Personal information
- Full name: Andriani Andriani
- Born: 9 April 1995 (age 31); Karawang, West Java, Indonesia
- Batting: Right-handed
- Bowling: Right-arm medium-fast

International information
- National side: Indonesia
- T20I debut (cap 1): 12 January 2019 v Hong Kong
- Last T20I: 14 February 2024 v United Arab Emirates

Career statistics
Competition	WT20I
Matches	26
Runs scored	205
Batting average	18.63
100s/50s	0/1
Top score	55*
Balls bowled	432
Wickets	31
Bowling average	7.87
5 wickets in innings	0
10 wickets in match	0
Best bowling	4/8
Catches/stumpings	5/3
Medal record
Women's Cricket
Representing Indonesia
Southeast Asian Games
Gold medal – first place	2023 Phnom Penh	6s
Silver medal – second place	2017 Kuala Lumpur	Twenty20
- Source: Cricinfo, 7 October 2024

Andriani (born 9 April 1995) is an Indonesian woman cricketer. She was part of the Indonesian women's national cricket team which emerged as runners-up to Thailand in the women's tournament at the 2017 Southeast Asian Games. She topscored for Indonesia with a knock of 46 in the low-scoring final where Indonesia was bowled out for just 86 while chasing a target of 110 runs.

She also represented West Java province at the 2016 Indonesian National Games.
