= Cook Islands Cricket Association =

Sports governing body in the Cook Islands

Cook Islands Cricket
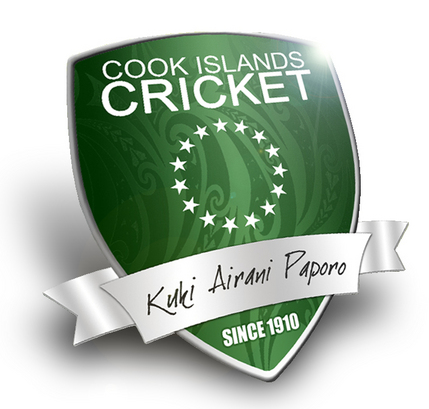
- Sport: Cricket
- Founded: Circa 1900
- Affiliation: East Asia-Pacific Cricket Council
- Affiliation date: 2000
- Headquarters: Rarotonga, Cook Islands
- President: Grant Walker
- Sponsor: Maritime Cook Islands, 21 South Group, ANZ Bank New Zealand

Official website
- www.cookislandscricket.com
- (Cook Islands)

Cook Islands Cricket Association is the official governing body of the sport of cricket in Cook Islands. Its current headquarters is in Rarotonga, Cook Islands. Cook Islands Cricket Association is Cook Islands's representative at the International Cricket Council and is an affiliate member and has been a member of that body since 2000. It is also a member of the East Asia-Pacific Cricket Council. Cricket in the Cook Islands has been around for over a hundred years. The first official record of cricket is in 1910 with the registration of the Rarotonga Cricket Association, however photos pre date this to at least the late 19th century. CICA organizes the Cook Islands men's and women's national teams. In 2017, became an associate member

== History ==
Cricket in the Cook Islands has been around for over a hundred years. The first official record of cricket is in 1910 with the registration of the Rarotonga Cricket Association, however photos pre date this to at least the late 19th century. It is thought that cricket was originally brought to the capital Island of Rarotonga by merchant sailors and missionaries. Primarily played by the expat community local cricketers were playing well before the 1940s. Pukapuka, the furthest most northern island of the Cook Islands, which is closer to Samoa than any of its neighbouring Cook Islands, have long played a version of cricket named 'Polo Wale' more akin to the Samoan 'Kirikiti', though formal 'English' Cricket as it is called was introduced within the past 10 years. The Pukapukan's refer to cricket as their 'national sport' and it is no coincidence that the majority of the national male representative side originate from or are of Pukapukan descent. In 2009 Cook Islands Cricket employed its first CEO, Alister Stevic, since that time cricket participation in the Cook Islands has grown at an exponential rate.

== Objectives ==
The Objectives of the Cook Islands Cricket Association are;

- To be the No.1 Affiliate member of the International Cricket Council and
- To Be The Most World Renowned Home of Tropical Tours and Tournaments

== Governing body ==
Cook Islands Cricket is governed by the Cook Islands Cricket Association, with each island having its own affiliated committee. The Cook Islands Cricket Association officers are;

- President Grant M. Walker
- Vice President Punanga Kaveao
- Treasurer Gabe Raymond

== Awards ==
Cook Islands Cricket's exponential rise in participation and popularity has seen the Association collect a number of local and International Awards;

- 2013 Cook Islands Sports Awards – Alister Stevic | Winner Sports Administrator of the Year (finalist Pacific Islands Sports Awards).
- 2013 ICC EAP Development Awards – Winner Best Women's Cricket Initiative of the Year
- 2012 Cook Islands Sports Awards – Alister Stevic | Winner Sports Administrator of the Year (finalist Pacific Islands Sports Awards).
- 2012 ICC EAP Development Awards – Winner Best Women's Cricket Initiative of the Year
- 2012 ICC EAP Development Awards – Winner Best Junior Cricket Initiative of the Year
- 2011 Cook Islands Sports Awards – Alister Stevic | Winner Sports Administrator of the Year (finalist Pacific Islands Sports Awards).
- 2011 ICC EAP Development Awards – Winner Marketing & Media Promotion of the Year
- 2011 Cook Islands Sports Awards – Rere Mataiti | Aitutaki Cricket | IOC Personality of the Year
- 2011 ICC EAP Development Awards – Taoi Nooroa | Mangaia Cricket | Volunteer of the Year
- 2010 Cook Islands Sports Awards – Alister Stevic | Sports Administrator of the Year (finalist Pacific Islands Sports Awards).
- 2010 Cook Islands Sports Awards – Koria Patia | IOC Personality of the Year

== Population and participation ==
The Cook Islands comprises 15 small islands whose total land area is 240 square kilometres (92.7 sq mi). The Cook Islands' Exclusive Economic Zone (EEZ), however, covers 1,800,000 square kilometres (690,000 sq mi) of ocean.[4] As at the 2006 census the population of the Cook Islands was 19,569. As at 2014 approximately 3000 children participate in formalised cricket activities and approximately 900 adults.

== Islands cricket competitions ==
As at 2014 10 of 13 inhabited islands participate in junior cricket.

Southern Group

1. Aitutaki
2. Atiu
3. Mangaia
4. Mauke
5. Rarotonga
6. Palmerston

Northern Group

1. Pukapuka
2. Nassau
3. Penhryn
4. Manihiki

As at 2014 6 of 13 inhabited islands participate in senior men's and women's cricket.

Southern Group

1. Aitutaki
2. Mangaia
3. Mauke
4. Rarotonga

Northern Group

1. Pukapuka
2. Penhryn

== First-class competitions ==
In 2010 Cook Islands Cricket introduced its first-class cricket system which comprises representatives sides from the islands of Pukapuka, Aitutaki and Rarotonga. The Cook Islands Domestic League or D-League as it is commonly referred to is Twenty20 in format.

== Tours and tournaments ==
Cricket in the Cook Islands involves a combination of cultural elements and competition. Players in the Cook Islands often utilize the Twenty20 format, characterized by batters hitting the ball with force and fast bowling. The Cook Islands Cricket Association organizes an annual event.

== Passport challenges ==
The Cook Islands is one of three International Cricket Council member countries that do not issue their own passports, instead Cook Islanders have New Zealand passports, this presents significant challenges for Cook Islands Cricket in eligibility of its overseas based and even returning Cook Islands resident players.

== See also ==
- Cook Islands national cricket team
- Cook Islands women's national cricket team
- Cook Islands national under-19 cricket team
- Cook Islands women's national under-19 cricket team
