= List of Fiji women Twenty20 International cricketers =

This is a list of Fiji women Twenty20 International cricketers. A Twenty20 International is an international cricket match between two representative teams, each having Twenty20 International status, as determined by the International Cricket Council (ICC). A Twenty20 International is played under the rules of Twenty20 cricket.

This list includes all players who have played at least one T20I match and is initially arranged in the order of debut appearance. Where more than one player won their first cap in the same match, their names are initially listed alphabetically at the time of debut.

== Key ==
General

- ‡ – Captain
- † – Wicket-keeper
- First – Year of debut
- Last – Year of latest game
- Mat – Number of matches played

Batting

- Runs – Runs scored in career
- HS – Highest score
- 50 – Number of half-centuries scored
- Avg – Runs scored per dismissal
- * – Batsman remained not out

Bowling

- Wkt – Wickets taken in career
- BBI – Best bowling in an innings
- Ave – Average runs per wicket

Fielding

- Ca – Catches taken
- St – Stumpings affected

== Players ==
Statistics are correct as of 15 September 2025.

Fiji women T20I cricketers
General					Batting				Bowling				Fielding		Ref
No.	Name	First	Last	Mat	Runs	HS	Avg	50	Balls	Wkt	BBI	Ave	Ca	St	Ref
1	Ilivema Eranavula†	2019	2023	4	2	2*	2.00	0	–	–	–	–	1	0	
2	Semaema Lomani†	2019	2025	17	215	43	12.64	0	6	0	–	–	2	2	
3	Ruci Muriyalo‡†	2019	2023	29	443	49*	17.03	0	507	18	3/17	27.88	5	0	
4	Wainikiti Ofamoli	2019	2019	12	91	20	9.10	0	–	–	–	–	1	0	
5	Luanne Rika	2019	2019	11	25	15*	5.00	0	80	4	1/8	28.75	1	0	
6	Ledua Samani	2019	2019	7	12	7	1.71	0	6	0	–	–	0	0	
7	Mereia Tilau	2019	2019	10	9	4*	2.25	0	128	6	2/24	26.83	2	0	
8	Marica Vua	2019	2019	12	61	17	5.08	0	182	5	2/15	40.80	1	0	
9	Lanieta Vuadreu	2019	2019	9	3	1	0.60	0	54	2	2/25	27.50	0	0	
10	Macatacola Vuruna	2019	2019	8	29	14	3.62	0	29	1	1/18	40.00	1	0	
11	Ilisapeci Waqavakatoga‡	2019	2025	43	393	43	10.34	0	433	22	4/11	18.81	8	0	
12	Shirley Lote†	2019	2019	7	20	7	4.00	0	12	0	–	–	1	0	
13	Ariera Tagilala	2019	2019	10	62	27	8.85	0	48	0	–	–	0	0	
14	Luisa Vua	2019	2019	4	1	1	1.00	0	–	–	–	–	1	0	
15	Alicia Dean	2019	2019	7	122	55	17.42	1	84	7	4/21	12.85	1	0	
16	Kiera Amoe	2022	2025	12	10	4	1.42	0	–	–	–	–	2	0	
17	Melaia Biu	2022	2025	30	155	26*	7.38	0	556	15	3/7	38.33	3	0	
18	Takayawa Colati	2022	2022	5	15	12	5.00	0	–	–	–	–	1	0	
19	Maeavhanisi Erasito†	2022	2025	29	94	12*	4.27	0	–	–	–	–	12	0	
20	Ateca Kainoco	2022	2024	20	89	18	4.94	0	138	7	2/8	32.28	3	0	
21	Lagakali Lomani	2022	2024	16	52	15	3.71	0	59	2	1/16	43.50	5	0	
22	Olivia Sekilekutu	2022	2022	4	7	4	1.75	0	36	1	1/8	48.00	1	0	
23	Karalaini Vakuruivalu	2022	2025	30	91	19*	7.00	0	509	25	4/14	23.00	1	0	
24	Sulia Vuni†	2022	2025	31	220	44*	10.00	0	86	1	1/43	127.00	12	1	
25	Ana Gonerara	2022	2025	29	62	14	3.44	0	410	15	3/7	31.13	4	0	
26	Volau Mataki	2022	2022	2	9	6	4.50	0	–	–	–	–	0	0	
27	Elizabeth Rokoro	2022	2023	6	4	2*	1.33	0	–	–	–	–	0	0	
28	Cilia Lewatu	2023	2023	3	1	1	1.00	0	–	–	–	–	0	0	
29	Mereani Rodan	2023	2024	8	46	22	6.57	0	6	1	1/7	7.00	1	0	
30	Marica Ratuki	2023	2024	8	12	4	1.71	0	–	–	–	–	0	0	
31	Serafina Sigaiwasa	2023	2025	17	76	20	5.42	0	234	8	2/6	29.75	9	0	
32	Teresia Talemaitoga	2023	2023	3	6	4	3.00	0	–	–	–	–	0	0	
33	Silvia Kijiana	2024	2025	12	56	15*	5.60	0	120	5	2/15	24.00	0	0	
34	Mele Waqanisau	2024	2025	16	86	25*	6.61	0	276	13	2/10	20.69	4	0	
35	Akosita Poulter	2024	2025	4	10	8	5.00	0	–	–	–	–	0	0	
36	Elena Laini	2025	2025	2	6	6	6.00	0	–	–	–	–	0	0	
37	Akosita Levaci	2025	2025	8	0	0	0.00	0	108	6	2/21	17.50	1	0	
38	Jasvil Rokoro	2025	2025	5	0	0	0.00	0	42	1	1/24	62.00	2	0	
39	Tabatha Saville	2025	2025	5	60	33	20.00	0	–	–	–	–	4	0	
