= List of Indonesia women Twenty20 International cricketers =

This is a list of Indonesia women Twenty20 International cricketers. A Twenty20 International (T20I) is an international cricket match between two representative teams. A T20I is played under the rules of Twenty20 cricket. In April 2018, the International Cricket Council (ICC) granted full international status to Twenty20 women's matches played between member sides from 1 July 2018 onwards.

The list is arranged in the order in which each player won her first Twenty20 cap. Where more than one player won her first Twenty20 cap in the same match, they are listed alphabetically by surname.

== Key ==
General

- ‡ – Captain
- † – Wicket-keeper
- First – Year of debut
- Last – Year of latest game
- Mat – Number of matches played

Batting

- Runs – Runs scored in career
- HS – Highest score
- Avg – Runs scored per dismissal
- * – Batsman remained not out
- 50 – Number of half centuries
- 100 – Centuries scored

Bowling

- Wkt – Wickets taken in career
- BBI – Best bowling in an innings
- Ave – Average runs per wicket

Fielding

- Ca – Catches taken
- St – Stumpings affected

== Players ==
Statistics are correct as of 4 September 2026.

Indonesia women T20I cricketers
| General | | | | | Batting | | | | | Bowling | | | | Fielding | | Ref |
| No. | Name | First | Last | Mat | Runs | HS | Avg | 50 | 100 | Balls | Wkt | BBI | Ave | Ca | St | Ref |
|---|---|---|---|---|---|---|---|---|---|---|---|---|---|---|---|---|
| 1 | Andriani† | 2019 | 2024 | 26 | 205 | 55* | 18.63 | 1 | 0 | 432 | 31 | 4/8 | 7.87 | 5 | 3 | |
| 2 | Yulia Anggraeni‡† | 2019 | 2022 | 20 | 436 | 112 | 27.25 | 1 | 1 | – | – | – | – | 4 | 0 | |
| 3 | Puji Haryanti‡ | 2019 | 2019 | 13 | 7 | 6 | 1.00 | 0 | 0 | – | – | – | – | 2 | 0 | |
| 4 | Ni Kadek Fitria Rada Rani | 2019 | 2026 | 60 | 417 | 53* | 18.95 | 1 | 0 | 554 | 34 | 4/11 | 10.50 | 11 | 0 | |
| 5 | Ni Putu Ayu Nanda Sakarini† | 2019 | 2026 | 75 | 1,618 | 95* | 35.95 | 10 | 0 | – | – | – | – | 24 | 33 | |
| 6 | Ni Wayan Sariani‡† | 2019 | 2025 | 56 | 23 | 7 | 2.55 | 0 | 0 | 990 | 73 | 4/2 | 7.90 | 13 | 1 | |
| 7 | Netty Sitompul | 2019 | 2019 | 10 | 3 | 2* | 1.50 | 0 | 0 | 205 | 9 | 3/6 | 14.44 | 1 | 0 | |
| 8 | Annisa Sulistianingsih† | 2019 | 2019 | 7 | 15 | 10* | 3.75 | 0 | 0 | – | – | – | – | 0 | 1 | |
| 9 | Ni Made Putri Suwandewi | 2019 | 2026 | 67 | 176 | 23* | 11.73 | 0 | 0 | 1259 | 68 | 5/8 | 10.95 | 16 | 0 | |
| 10 | Kadek Winda Prastini† | 2019 | 2026 | 30 | 400 | 89* | 20.00 | 2 | 0 | 79 | 4 | 2/24 | 18.75 | 4 | 2 | |
| 11 | Yuliana | 2019 | 2019 | 11 | 51 | 15 | 8.50 | 0 | 0 | – | – | – | – | 2 | 0 | |
| 12 | Edenyce Eduard | 2019 | 2019 | 12 | 16 | 9 | 5.33 | 0 | 0 | 192 | 14 | 3/9 | 12.00 | 1 | – | |
| 13 | Berlian Duma Pare | 2019 | 2025 | 17 | 64 | 23 | 6.40 | 0 | 0 | – | – | – | – | 3 | 0 | |
| 14 | Aulia Avianty | 2019 | 2019 | 2 | 8 | 5 | 4.00 | 0 | 0 | – | – | – | – | 0 | 0 | |
| 15 | Taskia Hanum | 2019 | 2019 | 7 | 2 | 2* | – | 0 | 0 | 112 | 8 | 2/12 | 14.00 | 1 | 0 | |
| 16 | Anak Bastari | 2019 | 2019 | 6 | 177 | 80* | 177.00 | 2 | 0 | – | – | – | – | 4 | 0 | |
| 17 | Tantri Wigradianti | 2019 | 2019 | 3 | 7 | 4 | 2.33 | 0 | 0 | – | – | – | – | 0 | 0 | |
| 18 | Jantralia | 2019 | 2019 | 4 | 15 | 15* | – | 0 | 0 | 35 | 3 | 3/13 | 5.33 | 1 | 0 | |
| 19 | Dara Paramitha | 2019 | 2026 | 38 | 28 | 13 | 3.11 | 0 | 0 | 621 | 34 | 5/5 | 13.14 | 8 | 0 | |
| 20 | Rahmawati Pangestuti | 2019 | 2026 | 43 | 309 | 36* | 15.45 | 0 | 0 | 198 | 8 | 2/1 | 18.12 | 9 | 0 | |
| 21 | Maria Corazon† | 2022 | 2026 | 48 | 926 | 74* | 26.45 | 5 | 0 | 84 | 4 | 3/10 | 12.50 | 15 | 3 | |
| 22 | Sang Maypriani | 2022 | 2026 | 52 | 21 | 4* | 3.00 | 0 | 0 | 991 | 50 | 4/4 | 11.86 | 5 | 0 | |
| 23 | Laili Salsabila | 2022 | 2022 | 5 | – | – | – | – | – | 30 | 2 | 2/11 | 19.00 | 0 | 0 | |
| 24 | Mia Arda | 2022 | 2024 | 20 | 94 | 62* | 13.42 | 1 | 0 | – | – | – | – | 4 | 0 | |
| 25 | Lie Qiao | 2022 | 2026 | 27 | 19 | 10* | 6.33 | 0 | 0 | 462 | 28 | 4/9 | 9.60 | 11 | 0 | |
| 26 | Ni Ariani | 2023 | 2026 | 46 | 31 | 8 | 3.10 | 0 | 0 | 834 | 42 | 3/7 | 14.73 | 18 | 0 | |
| 27 | Ni Luh Dewi | 2023 | 2026 | 59 | 970 | 78 | 25.52 | 5 | 0 | 760 | 49 | 3/10 | 11.14 | 14 | 0 | |
| 28 | Kisi Kasse | 2023 | 2026 | 36 | 78 | 18* | 6.50 | 0 | 0 | 22 | 0 | – | – | 7 | 0 | |
| 29 | Desi Wulandari | 2024 | 2026 | 41 | 517 | 69 | 19.88 | 3 | 0 | 126 | 2 | 2/4 | 42.00 | 17 | 0 | |
| 30 | Sandra Bara | 2024 | 2024 | 6 | – | – | – | – | – | 138 | 11 | 4/4 | 3.45 | 2 | 0 | |
| 31 | Hilva Noor | 2024 | 2024 | 6 | 52 | 19 | 26.00 | 0 | 0 | 55 | 6 | 2/2 | 2.66 | 2 | 0 | |
| 32 | I Gusti Pratiwi† | 2024 | 2024 | 6 | 42 | 22* | 14.00 | 0 | 0 | – | – | – | – | 3 | 0 | |
| 33 | Ni Murtiari | 2024 | 2024 | 5 | 14 | 13* | – | 0 | 0 | 96 | 7 | 2/1 | 2.28 | 2 | 0 | |
| 34 | Ni Putri | 2024 | 2024 | 4 | 5 | 5* | – | 0 | 0 | 77 | 4 | 2/7 | 4.50 | 2 | 0 | |
| 35 | Tri Juniarti Penu Weo | 2024 | 2024 | 2 | 3 | 3* | 3.00 | 0 | 0 | – | – | – | – | 5 | 0 | |
| 36 | Rohmalia | 2024 | 2024 | 2 | 13 | 13 | 13.00 | 0 | 0 | 38 | 7 | 7/0 | 1.28 | 0 | 0 | |
| 37 | Jeanifer Ngana | 2024 | 2024 | 1 | – | – | – | – | – | 12 | 0 | – | – | 0 | 0 | |
| 38 | Dewa Sasrikayoni | 2024 | 2024 | 1 | 15 | 15* | – | 0 | 0 | – | – | – | – | 0 | 0 | |
| 39 | Tri Wardani Hamid | 2024 | 2024 | 1 | 12 | 12* | – | 0 | 0 | 3 | 2 | 2/1 | 0.50 | 0 | 0 | |
| 40 | Emily Sirs | 2025 | 2025 | 11 | 102 | 53* | 14.57 | 0 | 0 | 24 | 0 | – | – | 2 | 0 | |
| 41 | Noorainah | 2025 | 2025 | 4 | 4 | 4* | 4.00 | 0 | 0 | – | – | – | – | 1 | 0 | |
| 42 | Fatimah Albanjari | 2025 | 2025 | 3 | 4 | 4* | – | 0 | 0 | 20 | 3 | 2/4 | 2.66 | 2 | 0 | |
| 43 | Derni Bangi | 2026 | 2026 | 6 | 0 | 0 | 0.00 | 0 | 0 | 114 | 8 | 4/5 | 8.50 | 0 | 0 | |
| 44 | Sofia Velic | 2026 | 2026 | 3 | 3 | 1 | 1.00 | 0 | 0 | 61 | 4 | 2/25 | 16.75 | 0 | 0 | |
