= Emilio Aguinaldo College =

Private college in Manila, Philippines

- Former names: Marian School of Midwifery (1957); Marian School of Nursing and Midwifery (1959); Marian Junior College (1973); General Emilio Aguinaldo College (1977)
- Motto: Virtus, Excellentia, Servitum
- Motto in English: Virtue, Excellence, Service
- Type: Private
- Established: 1957; 69 years ago
- Academic affiliations: ASAIHL, PAPSCU
- President: Jose Paulo Campos
- Students: ≈ 6,000; Cavite Campus: ≈ 13,000
- Location: Main Campus: 1113-1117 San Marcelino Street, Ermita, Manila; Cavite Campus: Congressional East Avenue, Burol Main, Dasmariñas, Cavite; 14°34′57.01″N 120°59′11.65″E
- Campus: Ermita, Manila & Dasmariñas, Cavite
- Hymn: EAC Alma Mater song
- Colors: Red & white
- Nickname: Generals
- Sporting affiliations: National Collegiate Athletic Association (Philippines)
- Website: eac.edu.ph
- Location in Metro Manila Location in Luzon Location in the Philippines

The Emilio Aguinaldo College (EAC) is a private university based in Manila, Philippines.

Emilio Aguinaldo College, Dasmarinas
- Friendship Oval
- Interactive map of Emilio Aguinaldo College, Dasmarinas

Ground information
- Location: Dasmariñas, Philippines
- Country: Philippines
- Capacity: 250
- End names
- Ian Sinclair End; College End

International information
- First women's T20I: 21 December 2019: Philippines v Indonesia
- Last women's T20I: 29 December 2023: Philippines v Singapore
- As of 29 December 2023; Source: Cricinfo

It is a private, non-sectarian institute of education and runs under the management of the Yaman Lahi Foundation Inc.

== History ==
Emilio Aguinaldo College began with a man who envisioned the Filipino youth to be totally educated and trained through arts, sciences, and technology.

That man, Dr. Paulo C. Campos, one of the few Filipino National Scientists noted for his work on nuclear medicine, has been recognized and awarded for his numerous researches and publications. He is also credited for establishing the first and best-known radioisotope laboratory in the Philippines, the first research laboratory in the Department of Medicine, University of the Philippines, and the Thyroid Clinic of the UP-PGH Medical Center.

It was in 1957 when the Marian School of Midwifery, the forerunner of Emilio Aguinaldo College, was established under the management of Marian Clinics, Inc.

Two years after Dr. Crisanto S. Vito Cruz and Gregorio T. Delgado together with Mrs. Lolita R. Vito Cruz established the first Medical Secretarial School in the Philippines, the founding of the Marian School of Nursing and Midwifery immediately followed.

In 1973, the University Physicians’ Services Incorporated (UPSI) took over the school management. From Marian School of Nursing and Midwifery, its name was changed to Marian Junior College. Its level was elevated to full-fledged College with new courses being offered, such as Food Service and Technology and the Dietetic Internship Program.

After a year, medical arts and photography (innovative academic program) and the four-year Bachelor of Science in Secretarial Administration earned government recognition.

The College of Arts and Sciences was added to the list of colleges in 1976, offering Bachelor of Arts and Bachelor of Science programs. Both Bachelor of Science in nursing and its supplemental course were also given government recognition, thus establishing the College of Nursing.

Marian College began building the first school units at Dasmariñas, Cavite in 1977 to support the government's policy on dispersal and decongestion of the student population in Metro Manila, particularly in institutions of higher learning. The policy also aimed to introduce regional development and the democratization of opportunities in rural areas.

In September 1977, the name Marian College was changed to General Emilio Aguinaldo College to apply to both Manila and Cavite campuses. This was in consonance with the new direction of the government in recognizing and honoring national heroes. Eventually, the title “General” was dropped.

All courses offered in Manila were given permits to be offered in Cavite, with the addition of BS Criminology, Master of Arts in Teaching, Master of Arts in Education, and Master of Science in Nursing.

EAC Manila offered BSN supplemental for graduates in nursing (GN), who wanted to pursue a Bachelor of Science in Nursing, and Bachelor of Science in Foods and Nutrition and Industrial Cafeteria Management.

On the other hand, the Cavite campus offered technical courses in agricultural technology, electrical and electronics technology, and refrigeration and air conditioning technology.

On October 21, 1979, EAC Foundation Inc. was established at Dasmariñas, Cavite, thus giving birth to the Emilio Aguinaldo College of Medicine with Dr. Lourdes E. Campos as dean. In Manila, the College of Business Administration was given a permit to operate.

In 1980, UPSI formed the Yaman Lahi Foundation, Inc. to manage and operate the Manila and Cavite campuses.

Within the next five years, the focus was on curricular program development, which paved the way to more courses being given government recognition.

The College of Medicine and the University Medical Center of EAC Cavite were sold to De La Salle University Inc., now known as De La Salle University Medical Center (DLSUMC) under the division of De La Salle Medical and Health Sciences Institute (DLSMHSI). After that, the EAC administration focused on the development of EAC-Manila.

== Academics ==
The college offers degrees in liberal arts, allied health, business, criminology, education, engineering, tourism and hospitality management, medicine, and law. It also offers graduate programs in criminal justice, education, educational management, public administration, and business administration.

== Campuses ==
Emilio Aguinaldo College has two campuses. The main campus is in Ermita, Manila and the other is in Dasmariñas, Cavite.

=== Manila campus ===
The Manila campus is the older of the two campuses of EAC. It is located in San Marcelino Street, Ermita, Manila. The college has seven buildings equipped with academic and administrative spaces. The Aguinaldo International School Manila is also within the vicinity of EAC.

The main campus' teaching hospital is known as Medical Center, Manila which is a tertiary-level hospital established in 1965.

Manila campus

Sports and Cultural Center (Manila Campus)

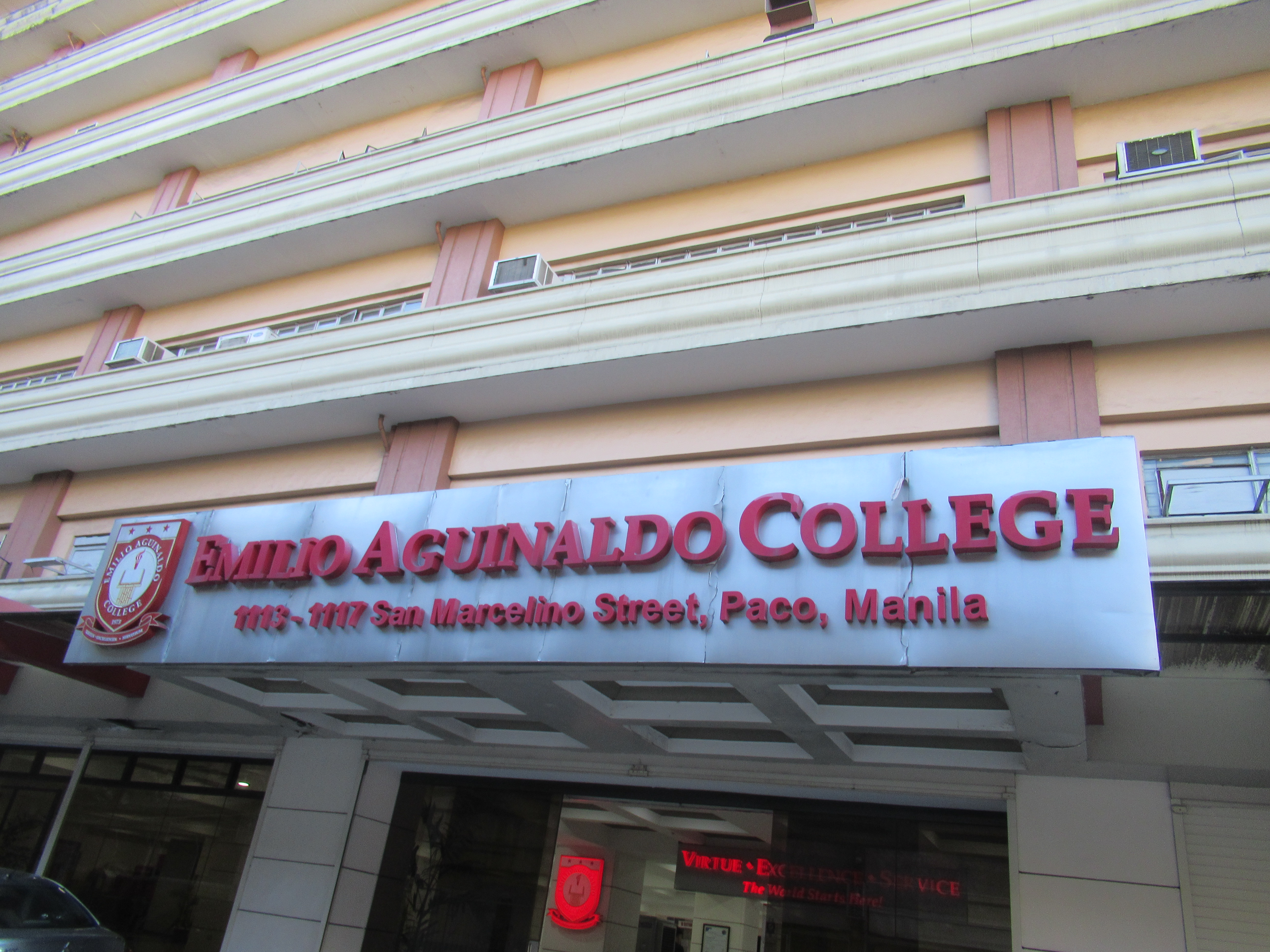
Emilio Aguinaldo College, Main Campus (Manila)

=== Cavite campus ===
The Cavite campus is located in Burol Main, Dasmariñas, Cavite. After the transfer of the original Cavite campus to De La Salle University in 1987, EAC Cavite ceased to exist. A few years later, in 1996, the EAC Manila administration established a technical vocational school called Center for Technical Education and Skills Training (CTEST) in Gov. D. Mangubat Avenue. It is nearby, around the hospital formerly affiliated with the college. With the completion of five buildings, in 1998, the school was renamed EAC Cavite.

The campus comprises five institutes, offering undergraduate degrees in several fields and postgraduate degrees in criminology, nursing, and education. These are the institutes of management, biomedical sciences, humanities & social sciences, and engineering, sciences and technology. The newest institute is Institute of the Law and Justice, which offers a Juris Doctor degree. This is the first law school in Dasmariñas and the second in Cavite province.

Currently, the campus has seven academic buildings, a library, a social hall, a covered court, and a sports oval. Construction is underway for Building 8, which will have 12 storeys comprising 72 classrooms.

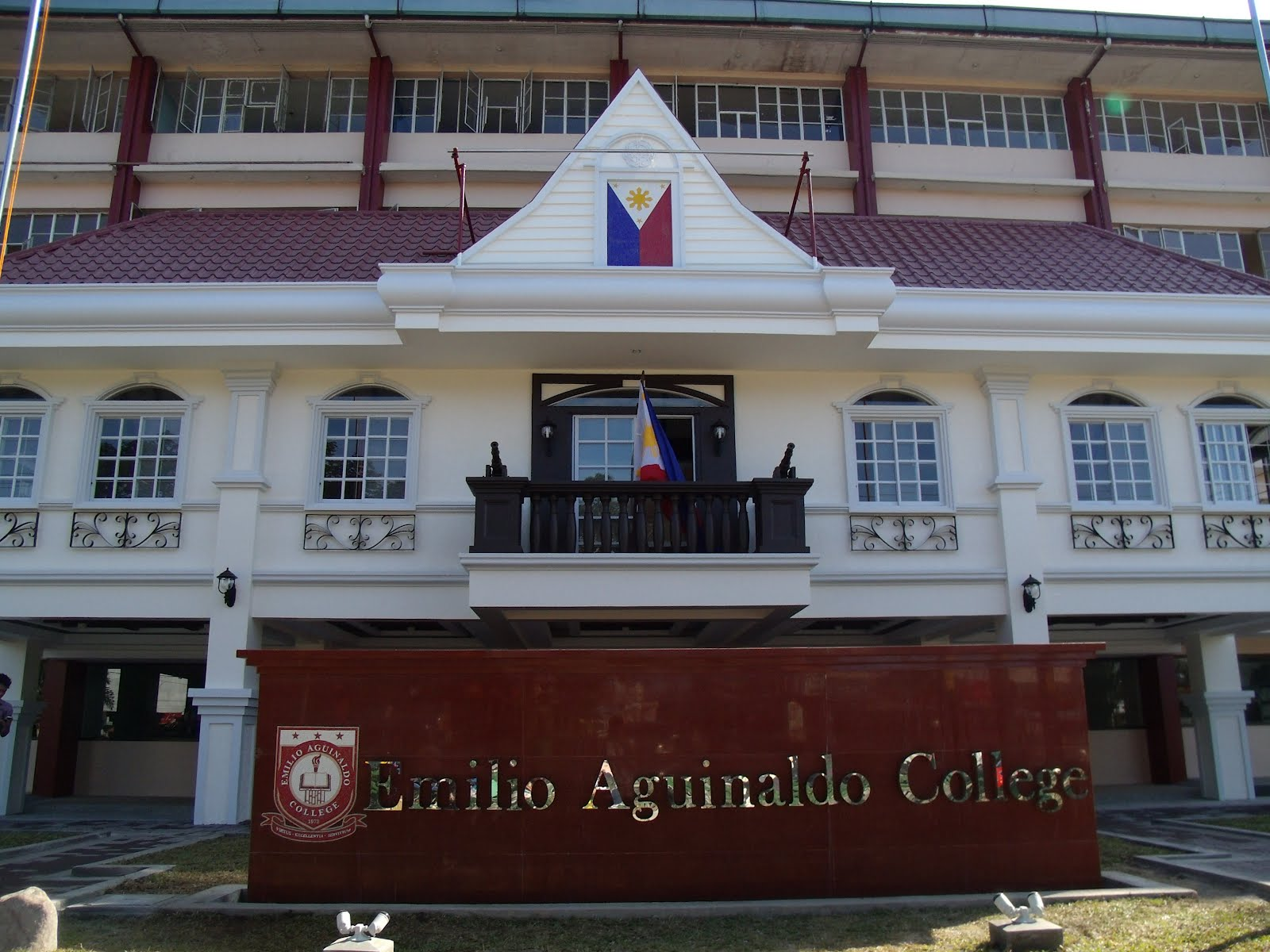
Emilio Aguinaldo College, Cavite Campus

== Athletics ==
The athletic teams of EAC Manila are called the Generals. They participated as guest team since 2009 and have been granted full membership of the National Collegiate Athletic Association on 2015.

On the other hand, EAC Cavite athletic teams are called the Vanguards. They participate in National Collegiate Athletic Association – South.
