= 2019 Women's T20 World Cup EAP Qualifier =

International cricket tournament

2019 ICC Women's Qualifier EAP
- Dates: 6 – 10 May 2019
- Administrator: International Cricket Council
- Cricket format: Twenty20 International
- Tournament format: Single round-robin
- Host: Vanuatu
- Champions: Papua New Guinea
- Runners-up: Samoa
- Participants: 6
- Matches: 15
- Most runs: (Samoa) Regina Lili'i (153)
- Most wickets: (Papua New Guinea) Kaia Arua (12)

The 2019 ICC Women's Qualifier EAP was a cricket tournament that was held in Vanuatu in May 2019. The matches in the tournament were played as Women's Twenty20 Internationals (WT20Is), with the top team progressing to both the 2019 ICC Women's World Twenty20 Qualifier and the 2021 Women's Cricket World Cup Qualifier tournaments.

The opening days of fixtures saw Papua New Guinea win both their matches, with Ravina Oa taking a five-wicket haul against Vanuatu in the first match, and Natasha Ambo taking five wickets in the second match, against Indonesia. In the final match of the tournament, Papua New Guinea beat Samoa by seven wickets to win the EAP Qualifier.

However, on 8 November 2021, Papua New Guinea announced that they had been forced to withdraw from the 2021 Women's Cricket World Cup Qualifier tournament due to several players recording positive tests for COVID-19.

== Teams ==
The following teams competed in the tournament:

- Fiji
- Indonesia
- Japan
- Papua New Guinea
- Samoa
- Vanuatu

== Points table ==
Pos	Team	Pld	W	L	T	NR	Pts	NRR	
1	Papua New Guinea	5	5	0	0	0	10	2.954	Advanced to qualifying tournament
2	Samoa	5	4	1	0	0	8	1.219	Eliminated
3	Vanuatu (H)	5	3	2	0	0	6	0.216	Eliminated
4	Indonesia	5	2	3	0	0	4	0.140	Eliminated
5	Japan	5	1	4	0	0	2	−1.296	Eliminated
6	Fiji	5	0	5	0	0	0	−4.052	Eliminated

(H) Host

== Fixtures ==
6 May 2019
09:30
Scorecard

Papua New Guinea; 144/4 (20 overs)	v	Vanuatu; 87 (20 overs)
Tanya Ruma 66 (66); Leimara Tastuki 1/20 (4 overs)		Leimara Tastuki 25 (28); Ravina Oa 5/13 (4 overs)

Papua New Guinea Women won by 57 runs
Independence Park Ground 1, Port Vila
Umpires: Kim Cotton (NZ) and Ian Thomson (Aus)
Player of the match: Ravina Oa (PNG)

- Papua New Guinea Women won the toss and elected to bat.
- Alvina Chilia, Valenta Langiatu, Rachel Andrew, Selina Solman, Nasimana Navaika, Leimara Tastuki, Johanna Sokomanu, Maiyllise Carlot, Melissa Fare, Mahina Tarimiala, Vicky Mansale (Van), Natasha Ambo, Helai Nou and Helen Buruka (PNG) all made their WT20I debuts.
- Ravina Oa (PNG) took her first five-wicket haul in WT20Is.

6 May 2019
09:30
Scorecard

Japan; 101/6 (20 overs)	v	Indonesia; 102/3 (17.2 overs)
Erika Oda 36* (48 overs); Taskia Hanum 2/18 (4 overs)		Yulia Anggraeni 40 (35); Rio Endo 1/20 (3 overs)

Indonesia Women won by 7 wickets
Independence Park Ground 2, Port Vila
Umpires: Sam Nogajski (Aus) and Zechariah Shem (Van)
Player of the match: Yulia Anggraeni (Ina)

- Japan Women won the toss and elected to bat.
- Tantri Wigradianti (Ina), Erika Oda, Akari Kitayama, Rio Endo, Eri Iko, Mai Yanagida, Miho Kanno, Madoka Shiraishi, Shizuka Miyaji, Nao Tokizawa, Akari Kano and Kasumi Nanno (Jpn) all made their WT20I debuts.

6 May 2019
13:30
Scorecard

Indonesia; 69/7 (20 overs)	v	Papua New Guinea; 70/3 (14.5 overs)
Ni Putu Ayu Nanda Sakarini 30* (43); Natasha Ambo 5/10 (4 overs)		Brenda Tau 30* (27); Ni Made Putri Suwandewi 1/6 (4 overs)

Papua New Guinea Women won by 7 wickets
Independence Park Ground 1, Port Vila
Umpires: Sam Nogajski (Aus) and Suresh Subramanian (Ina)
Player of the match: Natasha Ambo (PNG)

- Indonesia Women won the toss and elected to bat.
- Natasha Ambo (PNG) took her first five-wicket haul in WT20Is.

6 May 2019
13:30
Scorecard

Fiji; 78/8 (20 overs)	v	Samoa; 81/1 (9.4 overs)
Ilisapeci Waqavakatoga 27 (44); Lily Sinei Mulivai 2/11 (4 overs); Lagi Telea 2/11 (4 overs)		Regina Lili'i 37* (28); Mereia Tilau 1/12 (3 overs)

Samoa Women won by 9 wickets
Independence Park Ground 2, Port Vila
Umpires: Kim Cotton (Aus) and Alu Kapa (PNG)
Player of the match: Lily Sinei Mulivai (Sam)

- Fiji Women won the toss and elected to bat.
- Macatacola Vuruna, Ilisapeci Waqavakatoga, Semaema Lomani, Ruci Muriyalo, Marica Vua, Lanieta Vuadreu, Wainikiti Ofamoli, Ledua Samani, Mereia Tilau, Ilivema Eranavula, Luanne Rika (Fij), Regina Lili'i, Lelia Bourne, Lily Sinei Mulivai, Feala Laki Vaelua Pula, Lagi Telea, Kolotita Nonu, Taalili Iosefo, Taofi Lafai, Maria Tato, Solonaima Aoina and Litara Aoina all made their WT20I debuts.

7 May 2019
09:30
Scorecard

Japan; 119 (20 overs)	v	Samoa; 120/1 (15.4 overs)
Akari Kitayama 63 (54); Lily Sinei Mulivai 4/18 (4 overs)		Lelia Bourne 47 (38); Rio Endo 1/24 (3 overs)

Samoa Women won by 9 wickets
Independence Park Ground 1, Port Vila
Umpires: Alu Kapa (PNG) and Ian Thomson (Aus)
Player of the match: Akari Kitayama (Jpn)

- Samoa Women won the toss and elected to field.
- Ayaka Kanada (Japan) made her WT20I debut.

7 May 2019
09:30
Scorecard

Fiji; 23 (11.1 overs)	v	Papua New Guinea; 27/0 (3.1 overs)
Macatacola Vuruna 5 (10); Ravina Oa 4/4 (3.1 overs)		Sibona Jimmy 14* (9)

Papua New Guinea Women won by 10 wickets
Independence Park Ground 2, Port Vila
Umpires: Zechariah Shem (Van) and Suresh Subramanian (Ina)
Player of the match: Ravina Oa (PNG)

- Fiji Women won the toss and elected to bat.
- Shirley Lote, Ariera Tagilala, Luisa Vua (Fij) and Henao Thomas (PNG) all made their WT20I debuts.

7 May 2019
13:30
Scorecard

Indonesia; 55/6 (12.5 overs)	v	Samoa; 64/1 (11 overs)
Yulia Anggraeni 26 (28); Taalili Iosefo 2/8 (2 overs)		Regina Lili'i 28* (36); Ni Made Putri Suwandewi 1/15 (3 overs)

Samoa Women won by 9 wickets (DLS method)
Independence Park Ground 1, Port Vila
Umpires: Kim Cotton (NZ) and Sam Nogajski (Aus)
Player of the match: Regina Lili'i (Sam)

- Samoa Women won the toss and elected to field.
- Samoa were set a revised target of 64 runs from 13 overs due to rain.

7 May 2019
13:30
Scorecard

Vanuatu; 121/3 (13 overs)	v	Fiji; 75/8 (13 overs)
Valenta Langiatu 50 (27); Macatacola Vuruna 1/18 (3 overs)		Semaema Lomani 27 (31); Leimara Tastuki 2/15 (3 overs)

Vanuatu Women won by 63 runs (DLS method)
Independence Park Ground 2, Port Vila
Umpires: Alu Kapa (PNG) and Zechariah Shem (Van)
Player of the match: Valenta Langiatu (Van)

- Fiji Women won the toss and elected to field.
- Marcelina Mete and Valentina Tari (Van) both made their WT20I debuts.

9 May 2019
09:30
Scorecard

Vanuatu; 58 (17.3 overs)	v	Samoa; 59/2 (15 overs)
Rachel Andrew 19 (41); Lagi Telea 3/9 (4 overs)		Regina Lili'i 37* (44); Selina Solman 1/8 (3 overs)

Samoa Women won by 8 wickets
Independence Park Ground 1, Port Vila
Umpires: Sam Nogajski (Aus) and Ian Thomson (Aus)
Player of the match: Regina Lili'i (Sam)

- Vanuatu Women won the toss and elected to bat.

9 May 2019
09:30
Scorecard

Japan; 118/9 (20 overs)	v	Fiji; 87/8 (20 overs)
Eri Iko 22 (26); Mereia Tilau 2/24 (4 overs)		Ariera Tagilala 27 (36); Nao Tokizawa 2/7 (4 overs)

Japan Women won by 31 runs
Independence Park Ground 2, Port Vila
Umpires: Kim Cotton (Aus) and Suresh Subramanian (Ina)
Player of the match: Nao Tokizawa (Jpn)

- Japan Women won the toss and elected to bat.
- Ruan Kanai (Jpn) made her WT20I debut.

9 May 2019
13:30
Scorecard

Japan; 37 (19.3 overs)	v	Papua New Guinea; 38/0 (6.2 overs)
Madoka Shiraishi 7 (23); Kaia Arua 5/7 (4 overs)		Tanya Ruma 19* (19)

Papua New Guinea Women won by 10 wickets
Independence Park Ground 1, Port Vila
Umpires: Zechariah Shem (Van) and Ian Thomson (Aus)
Player of the match: Kaia Arua (PNG)

- Japan Women won the toss and elected to bat.
- Kotone Taniguchi (Jpn) made her WT20I debut.
- Kaia Arua (PNG) took her first five-wicket haul in WT20Is.

9 May 2019
13:30
Scorecard

Indonesia; 62 (16.5 overs)	v	Vanuatu; 63/6 (18.1 overs)
Kadek Winda Prastini 16 (44); Leimara Tastuki 3/9 (3.5 overs)		Nasimana Navaika 19* (27); Edenyce Eduard 3/9 (4 overs)

Vanuatu Women won by 4 wickets
Independence Park Ground 2, Port Vila
Umpires: Alu Kapa (PNG) and Sam Nogajski (Aus)
Player of the match: Leimara Tastuki (Van)

- Vanuatu Women won the toss and elected to field.
- Shania Kenni (Van) made her WT20I debut.

10 May 2019
09:30
Scorecard

Fiji; 69 (19.4 overs)	v	Indonesia; 73/2 (11.3 overs)
Ruci Muriyalo 20 (22); Netty Sitompul 3/6 (3.4 overs)		Anak Bastari 26* (24); Ruci Muriyalo 1/8 (3 overs)

Indonesia Women won by 8 wickets
Independence Park Ground 1, Port Vila
Umpires: Kim Cotton (NZ) and Zechariah Shem (Van)
Player of the match: Netty Sitompul (Ina)

- Indonesia Women won the toss and elected to field.

10 May 2019
09:30
Scorecard

Japan; 94/9 (20 overs)	v	Vanuatu; 95/1 (14.3 overs)
Erika Oda 19 (26); Nasimana Navaika 4/15 (4 overs)		Valenta Langiatu 35 (24); Rio Endo 1/5 (1 over)

Vanuatu Women won by 9 wickets
Independence Park Ground 2, Port Vila
Umpires: Alu Kapa (PNG) and Suresh Subramanian (Ina)
Player of the match: Nasimana Navaika (Van)

- Japan Women won the toss and elected to bat.

10 May 2019
13:30
Scorecard

Samoa; 82/6 (20 overs)	v	Papua New Guinea; 83/3 (16.4 overs)
Feala Laki Vaelua Pula 23 (38); Kaia Arua 3/9 (4 overs)		Brenda Tau 32* (30); Taalili Iosefo 1/19 (2.4 overs)

Papua New Guinea Women won by 7 wickets
Independence Park Ground 1, Port Vila
Umpires: Suresh Subramanian (Ina) and Ian Thomson (Aus)
Player of the match: Kaia Arua (PNG)

- Papua New Guinea Women won the toss and elected to field.
