= Koita Atai =

Papua New Guinean cricketer (born 1983)

Personal information
- Full name: Koita Helen Simon Atai
- Born: July 7, 1983 (age 43); Port Moresby, Papua New Guinea

International information
- National side: Papua New Guinea
- Source: Cricinfo, 7 December 2017

Koita Atai (born 7 July 1983) is a Papua New Guinean woman cricketer. She played for Papua New Guinea at the 2008 Women's Cricket World Cup Qualifier.
