= Indonesia women's national cricket team =

Cricket team

Indonesia
- Association: Cricket Indonesia

International Cricket Council
- ICC status: Associate member (2017); Affiliate member (2001)
- ICC region: Asia / East Asia-Pacific
ICC Rankings	Current	Best-ever
T20I	20th	19th (9 Nov 2022)

T20 Internationals
- First T20I: v Hong Kong at Asian Institute of Technology Ground, Bangkok; 12 January 2019
- Last T20I: v China at Bayuemas Oval, Pandamaran; 21 November 2026
T20Is	Played	Won/Lost
Total	84	59/24 (0 ties, 1 no result)
This year	20	12/8 (0 ties, 0 no results)
T20I first kit
T20I second kit
- As of 21 November 2026

The Indonesia national women's cricket team represents Indonesia in international women's cricket. The team made its international debut in January 2019 at the 2019 Thailand Women's T20 Smash in Bangkok.

In April 2018, the International Cricket Council (ICC) granted full Women's Twenty20 International (WT20I) status to all its members. Therefore, all Twenty20 matches played between Indonesia women and other ICC members since 1 July 2018 have the full WT20I status.

== History ==
In December 2020, the ICC announced the qualification pathway for the 2023 ICC Women's T20 World Cup. Indonesia was named in the 2021 ICC Women's T20 World Cup EAP Qualifier regional group, alongside seven other teams.

In January 2023 it was announced that Indonesia and Japan would be included in Asian Cricket Council (ACC) pathway events, while remaining in the ICC East Asia-Pacific development region.

== Tournament history ==
=== ICC Women's World Cup ===
World Cup record
Year	Round	Position	GP	W	L	T	NR
(England) 1973	Did not qualify/No women's ODI status						
(India) 1978	Did not qualify/No women's ODI status						
(New Zealand) 1982	Did not qualify/No women's ODI status						
(Australia) 1988	Did not qualify/No women's ODI status						
(England) 1993	Did not qualify/No women's ODI status						
(India) 1997	Did not qualify/No women's ODI status						
(New Zealand) 2000	Did not qualify/No women's ODI status						
(South Africa) 2005	Did not qualify/No women's ODI status						
(Australia) 2009	Did not qualify/No women's ODI status						
(India) 2013	Did not qualify/No women's ODI status						
(England) 2017	Did not qualify/No women's ODI status						
(New Zealand) 2022	Did not qualify/No women's ODI status						
(India) 2025	Did not qualify/No women's ODI status						
Total	0/13	0 Titles	0	0	0	0	0

=== ICC Women's World T20 ===
ICC Women's T20 World Cup records
Year	Round	Position	GP	W	L	T	NR
(England) 2009	Did not qualify						
(Cricket West Indies) 2010	Did not qualify						
(Sri Lanka) 2012	Did not qualify						
(Bangladesh) 2014	Did not qualify						
(India) 2016	Did not qualify						
(Cricket West Indies) 2018	Did not qualify						
(Australia) 2020	Did not qualify						
(South Africa) 2023	Did not qualify						
(Bangladesh) 2024	Did not qualify						
Total	0/8	0 Titles	0	0	0	0	0

=== ICC Women's T20 World Cup Global Qualifier ===
ICC Women's World Twenty20 Qualifier record
Year	Round	Position	GP	W	L	T	NR
(Republic of Ireland) 2013	Did not qualify						
(Thailand) 2015	Did not qualify						
(Netherlands) 2018	Did not qualify						
(Scotland) 2019	Did not qualify						
(United Arab Emirates) 2022	Did not qualify						
(United Arab Emirates) 2024	Did not qualify						
Total	0/6	0 Titles	0	0	0	0	0

=== Cricket at Summer Olympics Games ===
Cricket at Summer Olympics records
Host Year	Round	Position	GP	W	L	T	NR
(United States) 2028	To be determined						
(Australia) 2032	To be determined						
Total	–	0 Title	0	0	0	0	0

=== ICC Women's T20 Champions Trophy ===
ICC Women's T20 Champions Trophy records
Host Year	Round	Position	GP	W	L	T	NR
(Sri Lanka) 2027	To be determined						
2031	To be determined						
Total	–	0 Title	0	0	0	0	0

=== ICC Women's World Twenty20 East Asia Pacific Qualifier ===
ICC Women's World Twenty20 Asia Qualifier East Asia Pacific record
Year	Round	Position	GP	W	L	T	NR
(Vanuatu) 2019	Group stage	–	5	2	3	0	0
(Samoa) ~~2021~~	Cancelled due to COVID-19 pandemic						
(Vanuatu) 2023	Group stage	–	6	4	2	0	0
(Fiji) 2025	3rd-place	3/8	5	3	2	0	0
Total	3/3	0 Titles	16	9	7	0	0

=== ACC Women's Asia Cup ===
ACC Women's Asia Cup records
Host and year	Round	Position	GP	W	L	T	NR
(Sri Lanka) 2004	Did not enter (ODI format)						
(Pakistan) 2005-06	Did not enter (ODI format)						
(India) 2006	Did not enter (ODI format)						
(Sri Lanka) 2008	Did not enter (ODI format)						
(China) 2012	Did not qualify						
(Thailand) 2016	Did not qualify						
(Malaysia) 2018	Did not qualify						
(Bangladesh) 2022	Did not qualify						
(Sri Lanka) 2024	Did not qualify						
(United Arab Emirates) 2026	Group stage	7th	3	0	3	0	0
Total	1/10	0 Titles	3	0	3	0	0

=== ACC Women's Premier Cup ===
ACC Women's Premier Cup record
Year	Round	Position	GP	W	L	T	NR
2024 (Malaysia)	Quarter-finals	–	3	2	1	0	0
Total	1/1	0 Titles	3	2	1	0	0

=== Southeast Asian Games (T20I format) ===
Southeast Asian Games record
Year	Round	Position	GP	W	L	T	NR
(Malaysia) 2017	Silver Medal	2/4	4	2	2	0	0
(Cambodia) 2023	Silver Medal	2/7	3	2	1	0	0
Total	2/2	0 Titles	7	4	3	0	0

== Current squad ==
Updated as on 7 July 2024

This lists all the players who played for Indonesia in the 2024 Bali Bash Women's Tri-Nation Series.

Name	Age	Batting style	Bowling style	Notes
Batters
Maria Corazon	28	Right-handed	Right-arm off break	
Ni Kadek Fitria Rada Rani	29	Right-handed	Right-arm medium	
Kisi Kasse	30	Right-handed		
Kadek Winda Prastini	27	Right-handed	Right-arm medium	
All-rounders
Ni Luh Wesika Ratna Dewi	22	Right-handed	Right-arm medium	
Rahmawati Pangestuti	27	Left-handed	Right-arm medium	
Tri Wardani Hamid	30	Right-handed	Right-arm medium	
Wicket-keeper
Ni Putu Ayu Nanda Sakarini	29	Right-handed		
Spin Bowlers
Ni Wayan Sariani	36	Right-handed	Right-arm leg break	Captain
Lie Qiao	20	Right-handed	Right-arm off break	
Sang Ayu Maypriani	26	Right-handed	Right-arm off break	
Ni Kadek Ariani	22	Right-handed	Right-arm off break	
Pace Bowlers
Ni Made Putri Suwandewi	28	Right-handed	Right-arm medium	
Desi Wulandari	22	Right-handed	Right-arm medium	
Dara Paramitha	23	Right-handed	Right-arm medium	
Fatima zahra Albanjari	23	Right-handed	Right-arm medium	

== Records and statistics ==
International Match Summary — Indonesia Women

Last updated 21 November 2026

Playing Record
Format	M	W	L	T	NR	Inaugural Match
Twenty20 Internationals	84	59	24	0	1	12 January 2019

=== Twenty20 International ===
- Highest team total: 260/1 v. Philippines, 21 December 2019 at Friendship Oval, Dasmariñas
- Highest individual score: 112, Yulia Anggraeni v. Philippines, 21 December 2019 at Friendship Oval, Dasmariñas
- Best individual bowling figures: 7/0, Rohmalia v. Mongolia, 24 April 2024 at Udayana Cricket Ground, Jimbaran

Most T20I runs for Indonesia Women

Player	Runs	Average	Career span
Ni Sakarini	1,618	35.95	2019–2026
Ni Luh Dewi	970	25.52	2023–2026
Maria Corazon	926	26.45	2022–2026
Desi Wulandari	517	19.88	2024–2026
Yulia Anggraeni	436	27.25	2019–2022

Most T20I wickets for Indonesia Women

Player	Wickets	Average	Career span
Ni Wayan Sariani	73	7.90	2019–2025
Ni Suwandewi	68	10.95	2019–2026
Sang Maypriani	50	11.86	2022–2026
Ni Luh Dewi	49	11.14	2023–2026
Ni Ariani	42	14.73	2023–2026

T20I record versus other nations

Records complete to WT20I #3087. Last updated 21 November 2026.

Opponent	M	W	L	T	NR	First match	First win
ICC Full members
Bangladesh	1	0	1	0	0	31 August 2026	
Sri Lanka	1	0	1	0	0	2 September 2026	
vs Associate Members
Bahrain	1	1	0	0	0	11 February 2024	11 February 2024
Bhutan	4	3	1	0	0	14 January 2019	14 January 2019
Cambodia	1	1	0	0	0	8 May 2023	8 May 2023
China	5	2	3	0	0	26 May 2026	22 August 2026
Cook Islands	4	4	0	0	0	4 September 2023	4 September 2023
Fiji	3	3	0	0	0	10 May 2019	10 May 2019
Hong Kong	2	2	0	0	0	12 January 2019	12 January 2019
Japan	3	3	0	0	0	6 May 2019	6 May 2019
Kuwait	1	1	0	0	0	4 June 2026	4 June 2026
Malaysia	6	4	2	0	0	10 February 2024	15 May 2026
Mongolia	7	7	0	0	0	19 September 2023	19 September 2023
Myanmar	4	4	0	0	0	13 January 2019	13 January 2019
Nepal	2	0	2	0	0	18 January 2019	
Oman	3	3	0	0	0	10 June 2026	10 June 2026
Papua New Guinea	3	0	3	0	0	6 May 2019	
Philippines	6	6	0	0	0	21 December 2019	21 December 2019
Qatar	1	1	0	0	0	13 February 2024	13 February 2024
Samoa	2	1	1	0	0	7 May 2019	5 September 2023
Singapore	14	13	0	0	1	4 November 2022	4 November 2022
Thailand	4	0	4	0	0	15 January 2019	
United Arab Emirates	3	0	3	0	0	19 January 2019	
Vanuatu	3	0	3	0	0	9 May 2019	

== See also ==
- List of Indonesia women Twenty20 International cricketers
