= 2021–22 Fifty50 Challenge =

Women's cricket season

- Dates: 26 February – 12 March 2022
- Administrator(s): Zimbabwe Cricket
- Cricket format: 50 over
- Tournament format(s): Double round-robin and final
- Champions: Eagles (1st title)
- Participants: 4
- Matches: 13
- Most runs: Josephine Nkomo (268)
- Most wickets: Michelle Mavunga (15)

The 2021–22 Fifty50 Challenge was the second edition of the Fifty50 Challenge, a 50-over women's cricket competition played in Zimbabwe. The tournament took place in February and March 2022, with four teams competing in a double round-robin group stage.

Eagles won the competition, beating Rhinos in the final. The tournament was followed by the Women's T20 Cup.

== Competition format ==
Teams played in a double round-robin in a group of four, therefore playing 6 matches overall. Matches were played using a one day format with 50 overs per side. The top two in the group advanced to the final.

The group worked on a points system with positions being based on the total points. Points were awarded as follows:

Win: 5 points.
Tie: 3 points.
Loss: 0 points.
Abandoned/No Result: 3 points.

== Points table ==
Pos	Team	Pld	W	L	T	NR	Pts	NRR
1	Eagles (Q)	6	5	1	0	0	25	0.634
2	Rhinos (Q)	6	3	3	0	0	15	−0.041
3	Tuskers	6	2	4	0	0	10	−0.006
4	Mountaineers	6	2	4	0	0	10	−0.673

Source: CricketArchive, ESPNcricinfo

advanced to Final

== Fixtures ==
=== Group stage ===
26 February 2022
Scorecard

Eagles; 145 (43 overs)	v	Tuskers; 119 (43.4 overs)
Precious Marange 48* (71); Thuba Saidi 2/17 (4 overs)		Nomvelo Sibanda 28 (52); Olinda Chare 4/21 (8 overs)

Eagles won by 26 runs
Sunrise Sports Club, Harare
Umpires: Percival Sizara and Sarah Dambanevana

- Tuskers won the toss and elected to field.

26 February 2022
Scorecard

Mountaineers; 130 (38.5 overs)	v	Rhinos; 131/0 (18 overs)
Nyasha Gwanzura 34 (38); Ashley Ndiraya 3/6 (3 overs)		Ashley Ndiraya 87* (66)

Rhinos won by 10 wickets
Old Hararians, Harare
Umpires: Matsiliso Moyo and Tafadzwa Musakwa

- Rhinos won the toss and elected to bat.

28 February 2022
Scorecard

Eagles; 126 (37.1 overs)	v	Rhinos; 87 (28.5 overs)
Michelle Mavunga 27 (41); Josephine Nkomo 3/18 (8 overs)		Mary-Anne Musonda 27 (33); Christabel Chatonzwa 4/6 (7.5 overs)

Eagles won by 39 runs
Old Hararians, Harare
Umpires: David Shawane and Solomon Mangwiro

- Eagles won the toss and elected to bat.

28 February 2022
Scorecard

Tuskers; 142 (29 overs)	v	Mountaineers; 67 (31.1 overs)
Tasmeen Granger 61 (63); Nyasha Gwanzura 4/8 (3 overs)		Loryn Phiri 12 (42); Loreen Tshuma 3/9 (7.1 overs)

Tuskers won by 75 runs
Sunrise Sports Club, Harare
Umpires: Matsiliso Moyo and Oscar Tafirenyika

- Mountaineers won the toss and elected to field.

2 March 2022
Scorecard

Eagles; 187 (45.5 overs)	v	Mountaineers; 127/6 (37 overs)
Precious Marange 48 (61); Audrey Mazvishaya 2/18 (7 overs)		Pellagia Mujaji 45 (79); Kelis Ndlovu 2/16 (7 overs)

Eagles won by 26 runs (DLS)
Old Hararians, Harare
Umpires: Oscar Tafirenyika and Sarah Dambanevana

- Mountaineers won the toss and elected to field.
- Mountaineers target was 154 runs from 37 overs due to rain.

2 March 2022
Scorecard

Tuskers; 121 (31.1 overs)	v	Rhinos; 122/2 (42.3 overs)
Tasmeen Granger 22 (54); Ashley Ndiraya 4/22 (6.1 overs)		Josephine Nkomo 54* (126); Nomvelo Sibanda 1/22 (9.3 overs)

Rhinos won by 8 wickets
Sunrise Sports Club, Harare
Umpires: Matsiliso Moyo and Percival Sizara

- Rhinos won the toss and elected to field.

5 March 2022
Scorecard

Eagles; 152/9 (42 overs)	v	Tuskers; 74 (28 overs)
Modester Mupachikwa 42 (77); Anita Chirisimhuru 3/24 (9 overs)		Loreen Tshuma 16 (35); Christabel Chatonzwa 3/20 (8 overs)

Eagles won by 78 runs
Sunrise Sports Club, Harare
Umpires: Brendon Nyaude and David Shawane

- Tuskers won the toss and elected to field.
- Match reduced to 42 overs per side due to rain.

5 March 2022
Scorecard

Mountaineers; 173/8 (50 overs)	v	Rhinos; 174/2 (40.1 overs)
Pellagia Mujaji 49 (90); Josephine Nkomo 3/27 (9 overs)		Josephine Nkomo 61* (98); Loryn Phiri 2/28 (10 overs)

Rhinos won by 8 wickets
Old Hararians, Harare
Umpires: Oscar Tafirenyika and Solomon Mangwiro
Player of the match: Josephine Nkomo (Rhinos)

- Rhinos won the toss and elected to field.

7 March 2022
Scorecard

Eagles; 227/9 (50 overs)	v	Rhinos; 152/6 (50 overs)
Modester Mupachikwa 49 (63); Kelly Ndiraya 3/23 (4 overs)		Josephine Nkomo 79 (124); Kelis Ndlovu 2/31 (10 overs)

Eagles won by 75 runs
Old Hararians, Harare
Umpires: David Shawane and Matsiliso Moyo

- Rhinos won the toss and elected to field.

7 March 2022
Scorecard

Tuskers; 199/9 (50 overs)	v	Mountaineers; 87/2 (27.3 overs)
Tasmeen Granger 33 (70); Francisca Chipare 3/29 (10 overs)		Nyasha Gwanzura 35* (58); Anita Chirisimhuru 2/17 (6.3 overs)

Mountaineers won by 2 runs (DLS)
Sunrise Sports Club, Harare
Umpires: Brendon Nyaude and Sarah Dambanevana

- Mountaineers won the toss and elected to field.
- Mountaineers innings was curtailed at 27.3 overs due to rain; at that point, they needed to have scored 86 runs to win.

9 March 2022
Scorecard

Mountaineers; 167/8 (50 overs)	v	Eagles; 97 (27.5 overs)
Nyasha Gwanzura 73 (102); Precious Marange 3/23 (10 overs)		Modester Mupachikwa 22 (23); Nyasha Gwanzura 5/23 (8 overs)

Mountaineers won by 70 runs
Sunrise Sports Club, Harare
Umpires: Matsiliso Moyo and Oscar Tafirenyika

- Mountaineers won the toss and elected to bat.

9 March 2022
Scorecard

Tuskers; 158 (42.3 overs)	v	Rhinos; 105 (38.4 overs)
Chiedza Dhururu 40* (82); Dana Ndiraya 3/32 (10 overs)		Josephine Nkomo 34 (40); Lindokuhle Mabhero 5/23 (9.4 overs)

Tuskers won by 53 runs
Old Hararians, Harare
Umpires: David Shawane and Sarah Dambanevana

- Tuskers won the toss and elected to bat.

=== Final ===
12 March 2022
Scorecard

Eagles; 258/7 (50 overs)	v	Rhinos; 91 (36.3 overs)
Christabel Chatonzwa 108* (114); Dana Ndiraya 3/40 (9 overs)		Mary-Anne Musonda 22 (22); Michelle Mavunga 4/32 (8.3 overs)

Eagles won by 167 runs
Old Hararians, Harare
Umpires: Percival Sizara and Sarah Dambanevana

- Eagles won the toss and elected to bat.

== Statistics ==
=== Most runs ===
Player	Team	Matches	Innings	Runs	Average	HS	100s	50s
Josephine Nkomo	Rhinos	7	7	268	67.00	79	0	3
Christabel Chatonzwa	Eagles	7	7	200	33.33	108*	1	0
Nyasha Gwanzura	Mountaineers	6	6	183	36.60	73	0	1
Precious Marange	Eagles	7	7	175	29.16	48*	0	0
Ashley Ndiraya	Rhinos	7	7	156	26.00	87*	0	1

Source: ESPN Cricinfo

=== Most wickets ===
Player	Team	Overs	Wickets	Average	BBI	5w
Michelle Mavunga	Eagles	54.3	15	10.66	4/32	0
Ashley Ndiraya	Rhinos	51.1	13	11.46	4/22	0
Nyasha Gwanzura	Mountaineers	36.0	13	12.84	5/23	1
Loryn Phiri	Mountaineers	50.5	12	13.75	3/23	0
Josephine Nkomo	Rhinos	51.0	12	15.58	3/18	0

Source: ESPN Cricinfo
