= Zimbabwe women's cricket team in Thailand in 2022–23 =

International cricket tour

	Thailand	Zimbabwe
- Dates: 19 – 28 April 2023
Captains	Naruemol Chaiwai	Mary-Anne Musonda

One Day International series
- Results: Thailand won the 3-match series 3–0
Most runs	Naruemol Chaiwai (111)	Sharne Mayers (77)
Most wickets	Thipatcha Putthawong (9)	Kelis Ndhlovu (10)
- Player of the series: Naruemol Chaiwai (Tha)

Twenty20 International series
- Results: Thailand won the 3-match series 2–1
Most runs	Nannapat Koncharoenkai (78)	Sharne Mayers (77)
Most wickets	Nattaya Boochatham (4); Onnicha Kamchomphu (4)	Audrey Mazvishaya (6)
- Player of the series: Naruemol Chaiwai (Tha)

The Zimbabwe women's cricket team toured Thailand in April 2023 to play three One Day International (ODI) and three Twenty20 International (T20I) matches. This was Zimbabwe's first tour to Thailand for a bilateral series. Originally the tour was to consist of just three T20Is, before being expanded to a series of 3 ODIs and 4 T20Is. However, after the completion of the first match of the T20I series, it was announced that the series would be reduced to three matches due to scheduling conflicts with the Southeast Asian Games cricket tournament.

Thailand won all three matches of the ODI series. It was the first ever instance of an associate nation clean-sweeping an ODI series against a full member. Thailand also won the T20I series 2–1.

== Squads ==
Thailand	Zimbabwe
Naruemol Chaiwai (c); Nattaya Boochatham; Nanthita Boonsukham; Kanyakorn Bunthansen; Natthakan Chantam; Onnicha Kamchomphu; Rosenanee Kanoh; Nannapat Koncharoenkai (wk); Suleeporn Laomi; Banthida Leephatthana (wk); Phannita Maya; Thipatcha Putthawong; Chanida Sutthiruang; Sornnarin Tippoch	Mary-Anne Musonda (c); Christabel Chatonzwa; Francisca Chipare; Precious Marange; Sharne Mayers; Audrey Mazvishaya; Chipo Mugeri-Tiripano; Pellagia Mujaji; Modester Mupachikwa (wk); Ashley Ndiraya; Kelis Ndhlovu; Josephine Nkomo; Loryn Phiri; Nomvelo Sibanda; Loreen Tshuma

== ODI series ==
=== 1st ODI ===
19 April 2023
09:00
Scorecard

Thailand; 154 (43 overs)	v	Zimbabwe; 76 (24.1 overs)
Naruemol Chaiwai 57* (104); Kelis Ndhlovu 5/22 (9 overs)		Sharne Mayers 24 (24); Thipatcha Putthawong 6/6 (6.1 overs)

Thailand won by 78 runs
Terdthai Cricket Ground, Bangkok
Umpires: Tabarak Dar (HK) and Viswanadan Kalidas (Mas)
Player of the match: Thipatcha Putthawong (Tha)

- Thailand won the toss and elected to bat.
- Chipo Mugeri-Tiripano and Kelis Ndhlovu (Zim) both made their ODI debuts.
- Kelis Ndhlovu became the first player for Zimbabwe to take a five-wicket haul in women's ODIs.
- Thipatcha Putthawong became the first player for Thailand to take a five-wicket haul in women's ODIs.
- This was the third ever women's ODI in which both teams had a bowler take a five-wicket haul (India vs New Zealand in 2005, Netherlands vs Ireland in 2007).

=== 2nd ODI ===
21 April 2023
09:00
Scorecard

Thailand; 217 (50 overs)	v	Zimbabwe; 172/9 (50 overs)
Natthakan Chantam 54 (67); Kelis Ndhlovu 3/17 (10 overs)		Sharne Mayers 37 (53); Chanida Sutthiruang 2/14 (4 overs)

Thailand won by 45 runs
Terdthai Cricket Ground, Bangkok
Umpires: Viswanadan Kalidas (Mas) and Ashwani Kumar Rana (Tha)
Player of the match: Natthakan Chantam (Tha)

- Zimbabwe won the toss and elected to field.

=== 3rd ODI ===
23 April 2023
09:00
Scorecard

Zimbabwe; 112 (38.5 overs)	v	Thailand; 116/4 (27.2 overs)
Loreen Tshuma 32* (63); Nattaya Boochatham 3/7 (7 overs)		Naruemol Chaiwai 52* (60); Kelis Ndhlovu 2/19 (8 overs)

Thailand won by 6 wickets
Terdthai Cricket Ground, Bangkok
Umpires: Tabarak Dar (HK) and Ashwani Kumar Rana (Tha)
Player of the match: Naruemol Chaiwai (Tha)

- Zimbabwe won the toss and elected to bat.

== T20I series ==
=== 1st T20I ===
25 April 2023
09:00
Scorecard

Zimbabwe; 143/4 (20 overs)	v	Thailand; 119/9 (20 overs)
Sharne Mayers 71* (67); Phannita Maya 1/11 (1 overs)		Nannapat Koncharoenkai 29 (30); Audrey Mazvishaya 3/27 (4 overs)

Zimbabwe won by 24 runs
Terdthai Cricket Ground, Bangkok
Umpires: Tabarak Dar (HK) and Viswanadan Kalidas (Mas)
Player of the match: Sharne Mayers (Zim)

- Zimbabwe won the toss and elected to bat.
- Audrey Mazvishaya (Zim) took her first hat-trick in T20Is.

=== 2nd T20I ===
27 April 2023
14:00
Scorecard

Zimbabwe; 103/9 (20 overs)	v	Thailand; 106/5 (19.3 overs)
Chipo Mugeri-Tiripano 37 (34); Nattaya Boochatham 3/7 (4 overs)		Nannapat Koncharoenkai 39* (50); Audrey Mazvishaya 2/27 (3.3 overs)

Thailand won by 5 wickets
Terdthai Cricket Ground, Bangkok
Umpires: Arif Ansari (Tha) and Viswanadan Kalidas (Mas)
Player of the match: Nattaya Boochatham (Tha)

- Zimbabwe won the toss and elected to bat.
- This match was originally scheduled to take place on 26 April, but was rescheduled due to a storm.

=== 3rd T20I ===
28 April 2023
09:15
Scorecard

Zimbabwe; 111/6 (20 overs)	v	Thailand; 112/2 (16.4 overs)
Mary-Anne Musonda 28 (29); Onnicha Kamchomphu 3/20 (4 overs)		Natthakan Chantam 56* (53); Loreen Tshuma 1/20 (4 overs)

Thailand won by 8 wickets
Terdthai Cricket Ground, Bangkok
Umpires: Arif Ansari (Tha) and Tabarak Dar (HK)
Player of the match: Natthakan Chantam (Tha)

- Zimbabwe won the toss and elected to bat.
