= 2024 Fifty50 Challenge =

- Dates: 10 – 20 August 2024
- Administrator: Zimbabwe Cricket
- Cricket format: List A
- Tournament format: Double round-robin
- Host: Zimbabwe
- Champions: Eagles (3rd title)
- Runners-up: Tuskers
- Participants: 4
- Matches: 12
- Most runs: Chipo Mugeri-Tiripano (Mountaineers) (248)
- Most wickets: Nomvelo Sibanda (Tuskers) (17)

The 2024 Fifty50 Challenge, also known as the Zimbabwe Cricket Women's 1-Day Cup 2024, was the fourth edition of the Fifty50 Challenge, a women's List A cricket competition in Zimbabwe. The tournament was scheduled to take place from 10 to 20 August 2024. Four provincial teams competed in a double round-robin league. In August 2024, the Zimbabwe Cricket announced the fixtures for the tournament, with the matches held at Harare.

== Points table ==
Pos	Team	Pld	W	L	T	NR	Pts	NRR
1	Eagles	6	5	1	0	0	50	2.420
2	Tuskers	6	4	2	0	0	40	0.510
3	Mountaineers	6	3	3	0	0	30	0.679
4	Rhinos	6	0	6	0	0	0	−4.050

Source: ESPNcricinfo

Champions

== Fixtures ==
10 August 2024
09:30
Scorecard

Eagles; 135 (32.3 overs)	v	Mountaineers; 136/2 (21.2 overs)
Christabel Chatonzwa 45 (71); Loryn Phiri 4/25 (7.3 overs)		Chipo Mugeri-Tiripano 79* (66); Kelis Ndhlovu 1/6 (7 overs)

Mountaineers won by 8 wickets
Harare Sports Club, Harare
Umpires: Sarah Dambanevana and Stanley Gadzikwa
Player of the match: Loryn Phiri (Mountaineers)

- Mountaineers won the toss and elected to field.
- Points: Mountaineers 10, Eagles 0.

10 August 2024
09:30
Scorecard

Rhinos; 61 (20.2 overs)	v	Tuskers; 63/1 (6.1 overs)
Francisca Chipare 14 (14); Nomvelo Sibanda 3/7 (4.2 overs)		Sharne Mayers 41* (17); Kelly Ndiraya 1/9 (1 over)

Tuskers won by 9 wickets
Old Hararians, Harare
Umpires: Brighton Kutamahufa and Sifelani Rwaziyeni
Player of the match: Nomvelo Sibanda (Tuskers)

- Rhinos won the toss and elected to bat.
- Points: Tuskers 10, Rhinos 0.

12 August 2024
09:30
Scorecard

Tuskers; 95 (26.2 overs)	v	Mountaineers; 83 (27.5 overs)
Tendai Makusha 15* (29); Loryn Phiri 4/26 (7 overs)		Nyasha Gwanzura 29 (39); Nomvelo Sibanda 6/26 (10 overs)

Tuskers won by 12 runs
Harare Sports Club, Harare
Umpires: Sifelani Rwaziyeni and Alouis Zengenene
Player of the match: Nomvelo Sibanda (Tuskers)

- Mountaineers won the toss and elected to field.
- Points: Tuskers 10, Mountaineers 0.

12 August 2024
09:30
Scorecard

Rhinos; 94 (28.1 overs)	v	Eagles; 95/0 (11.3 overs)
Lorraine Pemhiwa 17 (29); Adel Zimunu 4/19 (6 overs)		Kelis Ndhlovu 50* (39)

Eagles won by 10 wickets
Old Hararians, Harare
Umpires: Sarah Dambanevana and Stanley Gadzikwa
Player of the match: Kelis Ndhlovu (Eagles)

- Rhinos won the toss and elected to bat.
- Points: Eagles 10, Rhinos 0.

14 August 2024
09:30
Scorecard

Mountaineers; 273 (41.4 overs)	v	Rhinos; 110 (32.1 overs)
Chipo Mugeri-Tiripano 114 (77); Francisca Chipare 3/32 (8 overs)		Kelly Ndiraya 46 (53); Kudzai Chigora 5/25 (8.1 overs)

Mountaineers won by 163 runs
Old Hararians, Harare
Umpires: Stanley Gadzikwa and Brighton Kutamahufa
Player of the match: Kudzai Chigora (Mountaineers)

- Rhinos won the toss and elected to field.
- Points: Mountaineers 10, Rhinos 0.

14 August 2024
09:30
Scorecard

Tuskers; 58 (15.4 overs)	v	Eagles; 59/2 (12.4 overs)
Sharne Mayers 37 (23); Kelis Ndhlovu 5/11 (7 overs)		Kelis Ndhlovu 20 (26); Nomvelo Sibanda 1/23 (4 overs)

Eagles won by 8 wickets
Harare Sports Club, Harare
Umpires: Sarah Dambanevana and Panashe Marovatsanga
Player of the match: Kelis Ndhlovu (Eagles)

- Eagles won the toss and elected to field.
- Points: Eagles 10, Tuskers 0.

16 August 2024
09:30
Scorecard

Rhinos; 52 (27 overs)	v	Tuskers; 53/5 (9.5 overs)
Divinia Ndlalambi 15 (41); Buhlebenkosi Maposa 5/9 (4 overs)		Tasmeen Granger 13* (9); Francisca Chipare 3/23 (5 overs)

Tuskers won by 5 wickets
Harare Sports Club, Harare
Umpires: David Shawane and Oscar Tafirenyika
Player of the match: Buhlebenkosi Maposa (Tuskers)

- Rhinos won the toss and elected to bat.
- Points: Tuskers 10, Rhinos 0.

16 August 2024
09:30
Scorecard

Mountaineers; 160 (32.2 overs)	v	Eagles; 161/7 (24.5 overs)
Chipo Mugeri-Tiripano 41 (36); Beloved Biza 3/4 (4.2 overs)		Beloved Biza 48 (50); Kudzai Chigora 3/53 (24.5 overs)

Eagles won by 3 wickets
Old Hararians, Harare
Umpires: Panashe Marovatsanga and Justice Tapfumaneyi
Player of the match: Beloved Biza (Eagles)

- Eagles won the toss and elected to field.
- Points:Eagles 10, Mountaineers 0.

18 August 2024
09:30
Scorecard

Rhinos; 45 (22.4 overs)	v	Eagles; 46/1 (8 overs)
Divinia Ndlalambi 8 (13); Kelis Ndhlovu 4/21 (6 overs)		Christabel Chatonzwa 17* (18); Francisca Chipare 1/18 (4 overs)

Eagles won by 9 wickets
Harare Sports Club, Harare
Umpires: Panashe Marovatsanga and Sifelani Rwaziyeni
Player of the match: Kelis Ndhlovu (Eagles)

- Rhinos won the toss and elected to bat.
- Points: Eagles 10, Rhinos 0.

18 August 2024
09:30
Scorecard

Tuskers; 129 (26.4 overs)	v	Mountaineers; 74 (20.3 overs)
Tasmeen Granger 31 (44); Loryn Phiri 3/19 (4 overs)		Loryn Phiri 30 (41); Nomvelo Sibanda 5/18 (8.3 overs)

Tuskers won by 55 runs
Old Hararians, Harare
Umpires: Brighton Kutamahufa and Stanley Gadzikwa
Player of the match: Nomvelo Sibanda (Tuskers)

- Mountaineers won the toss and elected to field.
- Points: Tuskers 10, Mountaineers 0.

20 August 2024
09:30
Scorecard

Tuskers; 124 (39.1 overs)	v	Eagles; 125/5 (25.3 overs)
Tasmeen Granger 51 (71); Kelis Ndhlovu 2/16 (6 overs)		Beloved Biza 44* (64); Nomvelo Sibanda 2/20 (7 overs)

Eagles won by 5 wickets
Old Hararians, Harare
Umpires: Oscar Tafirenyika and Alouis Zengenene
Player of the match: Beloved Biza (Eagles)

- Tuskers won the toss and elected to bat.

20 August 2024
09:30
Scorecard

Rhinos; 89 (27.1 overs)	v	Mountaineers; 90/4 (26.2 overs)
Kelly Ndiraya 39 (48); Passionate Munorwei 4/14 (8 overs)		Pellagia Mujaji 29 (36); Vimbai Kavava 2/16 (9.2 overs)

Mountaineers won by 6 wickets
Harare Sports Club, Harare
Umpires: Danny Tumozo and Justice Tapfumaneyi
Player of the match: Passionate Munorwei (Mountaineers)

- Rhinos won the toss and elected to bat.
