= Ireland women's cricket team in Zimbabwe in 2023–24 =

International cricket tour

	Zimbabwe	Ireland
- Dates: 18 January – 2 February 2024
Captains	Mary-Anne Musonda	Laura Delany

One Day International series
- Results: Ireland won the 3-match series 2–0
Most runs	Ashley Ndiraya (113)	Gaby Lewis (115)
Most wickets	Loreen Tshuma (4); Kelis Ndhlovu (4)	Cara Murray (10)

Twenty20 International series
- Results: Ireland won the 5-match series 5–0
Most runs	Kelis Ndhlovu (157)	Amy Hunter (240)
Most wickets	Kelis Ndhlovu (4)	Laura Delany (8)
- Player of the series: Amy Hunter (Ire)

The Ireland women's cricket team toured Zimbabwe in January and February 2024 to play the Zimbabwe women's cricket team. The tour consisted of three One Day International (ODI) and five Twenty20 International (T20I) matches. The T20I matches formed part of both teams' preparations for the 2024 ICC Women's T20 World Cup Qualifier.

Ireland comfortably won the rain-affected first ODI by 10 wickets. The second match ended in a rain-affected tie. A victory by 81 runs in the third game handed the ODI series 2–0 to Ireland.

The tourists won the first T20I by 57 runs. During the match, Amy Hunter became the first Irish woman, and the third Irish cricketer (men or women), to score a century in both T20Is and ODIs. Ireland also won the next two matches of the series to take an unassailable lead in the T20I series. Ireland won the rain-curtailed fourth match by 9 wickets. The tourists went on to win the fifth game by 14 runs, and therefore swept the T20I series 5–0.

== Squads ==
Zimbabwe	Ireland	
ODIs & T20Is	ODIs	T20Is
Mary-Anne Musonda (c); Beloved Biza; Kudzai Chigora; Francisca Chipare; Chiedza Dhururu (wk); Nyasha Gwanzura; Lindokuhle Mabhero; Precious Marange; Michelle Mavunga; Audrey Mazvishaya; Pellagia Mujaji; Chipo Mugeri-Tiripano; Christine Mutasa; Ashley Ndiraya; Kelis Ndhlovu; Nomvelo Sibanda; Loreen Tshuma; Adel Zimunu	Laura Delany (c); Ava Canning; Alana Dalzell; Georgina Dempsey; Sarah Forbes; Amy Hunter (wk); Arlene Kelly; Gaby Lewis; Joanna Loughran (wk); Jane Maguire; Cara Murray; Leah Paul; Orla Prendergast; Freya Sargent; Rebecca Stokell	Laura Delany (c); Ava Canning; Alana Dalzell; Georgina Dempsey; Amy Hunter (wk); Arlene Kelly; Gaby Lewis; Louise Little; Joanna Loughran (wk); Sophie MacMahon; Cara Murray; Leah Paul; Orla Prendergast; Freya Sargent; Rebecca Stokell

Sophie MacMahon returned home after the first T20I due to a knee injury sustained while fielding.

== Tour match ==
16 January 2024
09:15
Scorecard

Ireland; 222/6 (36 overs)	v	Zimbabwe A 101 (31.3 overs)
Orla Prendergast 56 (52); Kudzai Chigora 2/31 (6 overs)		Loryn Phiri 19 (30); Cara Murray 3/13 (4.3 overs)

Ireland won by 151 runs (DLS method)
Sunrise Sports Club, Harare
Umpires: Innocent Chinyoka (Zim) and Matsiliso Moyo (Zim)

- Ireland won the toss and elected to bat.
- Zimbabwe A were set a revised target of 252 runs in 36 overs due to rain.

== ODI series ==
=== 1st ODI ===
18 January 2024
09:15
Scorecard

Zimbabwe; 170 (42.5 overs)	v	Ireland; 110/0 (13.1 overs)
Ashley Ndiraya 47 (53); Freya Sargent 3/29 (7.5 overs)		Gaby Lewis 65* (41)

Ireland won by 10 wickets (DLS method)
Harare Sports Club, Harare
Umpires: Sarah Dambanevana (Zim) and Collin Tlou (Zim)
Player of the match: Gaby Lewis (Ire)

- Ireland won the toss and elected to field.
- Ireland were set a revised target of 110 runs in 21 overs due to rain.
- Kudzai Chigora and Michelle Mavunga (Zim) both made their ODI debuts.

=== 2nd ODI ===
21 January 2024
09:15
Scorecard

Zimbabwe; 227/9 (50 overs)	v	Ireland; 202/9 (43 overs)
Chiedza Dhururu 46 (74); Arlene Kelly 4/35 (10 overs)		Gaby Lewis 42 (64); Kelis Ndhlovu 3/36 (9 overs)

Match tied (DLS method)
Harare Sports Club, Harare
Umpires: Sarah Dambanevana (Zim) and David Shawane (Zim)

- Ireland won the toss and elected to field.
- Ireland were set a revised target of 203 runs in 43 overs due to rain.
- Lindokuhle Mabhero (Zim) made her ODI debut.

=== 3rd ODI ===
23 January 2024
09:15
Scorecard

Ireland; 180 (48.1 overs)	v	Zimbabwe; 99 (30.5 overs)
Orla Prendergast 41 (67); Loreen Tshuma 2/27 (9 overs)		Ashley Ndiraya 25 (35); Cara Murray 6/31 (6.5 overs)

Ireland won by 81 runs
Harare Sports Club, Harare
Umpires: Percival Sizara (Zim) and Collin Tlou (Zim)
Player of the match: Cara Murray (Ire)

- Zimbabwe won the toss and elected to field.

== T20I series ==
=== 1st T20I ===
26 January 2024
13:00
Scorecard

Ireland; 191/3 (20 overs)	v	Zimbabwe; 134/5 (20 overs)
Amy Hunter 101* (66); Kudzai Chigora 2/46 (4 overs)		Mary-Anne Musonda 46 (42); Alana Dalzell 2/20 (4 overs)

Ireland won by 57 runs
Harare Sports Club, Harare
Umpires: Sarah Dambanevana (Zim) and Tafadzwa Musakwa (Zim)
Player of the match: Amy Hunter (Ire)

- Ireland won the toss and elected to bat.
- Kudzai Chigora (Zim) made her T20I debut.
- Amy Hunter (Ire) scored her first century in T20Is.

=== 2nd T20I ===
28 January 2024
13:00
Scorecard

Ireland; 172/3 (20 overs)	v	Zimbabwe; 130/8 (20 overs)
Amy Hunter 77* (57); Lindokuhle Mabhero 1/12 (1 over)		Kelis Ndhlovu 52 (41); Laura Delany 4/12 (4 over)

Ireland won by 42 runs
Harare Sports Club, Harare
Umpires: Matsiliso Moyo (Zim) and Percival Sizara (Zim)
Player of the match: Laura Delany (Ire)

- Zimbabwe won the toss and elected to field.
- Christine Mutasa (Zim) made her T20I debut.

=== 3rd T20I ===
30 January 2024
13:00
Scorecard

Ireland; 169/3 (20 overs)	v	Zimbabwe; 109/7 (20 overs)
Orla Prendergast 69 (48); Loreen Tshuma 1/29 (4 overs)		Kelis Ndhlovu 36 (31); Louise Little 2/8 (2 overs)

Ireland won by 60 runs
Harare Sports Club, Harare
Umpires: Sarah Dambanevana (Zim) and Tafadzwa Musakwa (Zim)
Player of the match: Orla Prendergast (Ire)

- Ireland won the toss and elected to bat.
- Laura Delany (Ire) became the first Irish women cricketer to play in her 100 T20Is.

=== 4th T20I ===
1 February 2024
18:30 (D/N)
Scorecard

Zimbabwe; 65/5 (8 overs)	v	Ireland; 70/1 (7.5 overs)
Kelis Ndhlovu 17 (17); Georgina Dempsey 1/3 (1 over)		Gaby Lewis 25* (21); Lindokuhle Mabhero 1/6 (1 over)

Ireland won by 9 wickets
Harare Sports Club, Harare
Umpires: Stanley Gogwe (Zim) and Matsiliso Moyo (Zim)
Player of the match: Orla Prendergast (Ire)

- Ireland won the toss and elected to field.
- The match was reduced to 8 overs per side due to rain.

=== 5th T20I ===
2 February 2024
18:30 (D/N)
Scorecard

Ireland; 138/7 (20 overs)	v	Zimbabwe; 124/8 (20 overs)
Gaby Lewis 42 (33); Kelis Ndhlovu 3/20 (4 overs)		Mary-Anne Musonda 52 (43); Laura Delany 3/17 (4 overs)

Ireland won by 14 runs
Harare Sports Club, Harare
Umpires: Stanley Gogwe (Zim) and Tafadzwa Musakwa (Zim)
Player of the match: Orla Prendergast (Ire)

- Zimbabwe won the toss and elected to field.
- Beloved Biza (Zim) and Joanna Loughran (Ire) both made their T20I debuts.
