= Bangladesh women's cricket team in Zimbabwe in 2021–22 =

International cricket tour

	Zimbabwe women	Bangladesh women
- Dates: 10 – 15 November 2021
Captains	Mary-Anne Musonda	Nigar Sultana (Note: Fahima Khatun captained Bangladesh for the first and second WODIs.)

One Day International series
- Results: Bangladesh women won the 3-match series 3–0
Most runs	Modester Mupachikwa (48)	Murshida Khatun (97)
Most wickets	Esther Mbofana (3)	Nahida Akter (11)
- Player of the series: Nahida Akter (Ban); Murshida Khatun (Ban)

The visiting Bangladesh women's cricket team played three Women's One Day Internationals (WODIs) against the Zimbabwe women's cricket team in November 2021. The matches were played at the Queens Sports Club in Bulawayo, and were used by both teams for their preparation for the 2021 Women's Cricket World Cup Qualifier tournament, also in Zimbabwe.

Bangladesh made a clean sweep of the three-WODI series. Bangladesh won the opening match by eight wickets, after Zimbabwe were bowled out for only 48 runs. Bangladesh won the second match by nine wickets to win the series with one game to play. Bangladesh also won the third and final match, by seven wickets, to win the series 3–0.

== Squads ==
WODIs
Zimbabwe	Bangladesh
Mary-Anne Musonda (c); Christabel Chatonzwa; Francisca Chipare; Chiedza Dhururu; Tasmeen Granger; Nyasha Gwanzura; Precious Marange; Sharne Mayers; Audrey Mazvishaya; Esther Mbofana; Modester Mupachikwa (wk); Ashley Ndiraya; Josephine Nkomo; Loryn Phiri; Nomvelo Sibanda; Loreen Tshuma	Nigar Sultana (c, wk); Rumana Ahmed; Jahanara Alam; Sharmin Akhter; Nahida Akter; Fargana Hoque; Fahima Khatun; Murshida Khatun; Salma Khatun; Khadija Tul Kubra; Sanjida Akter Meghla; Lata Mondal; Ritu Moni; Sobhana Mostary; Nuzhat Tasnia; Fariha Trisna

Shamima Sultana and Suraiya Azmin were both named as reserve players in Bangladesh's squad. Zimbabwe's preparations were hindered by injuries to several players, including senior batter Chipo Mugeri-Tiripano who suffered a broken foot during T20 World Cup Africa Qualifier in September 2021, and was ruled out of this series.

== WODI series ==
=== 1st WODI ===
10 November 2021
09:30
Scorecard

Zimbabwe; 48 (23.2 overs)	v	Bangladesh; 49/2 (10.4 overs)
Precious Marange 17 (30); Nahida Akter 3/2 (5.2 overs)		Rumana Ahmed 16* (20); Precious Marange 1/11 (3 overs)

Bangladesh Women by 8 wickets
Queens Sports Club, Bulawayo
Umpires: Stanley Gogwe (Zim) and Percival Sizara (Zim)
Player of the match: Jahanara Alam (Ban)

- Bangladesh Women won the toss and elected to field.
- Christabel Chatonzwa and Francisca Chipare (Zim) both made their WODI debuts.

=== 2nd WODI ===
13 November 2021
09:30
Scorecard

Zimbabwe; 121 (46.4 overs)	v	Bangladesh; 125/1 (24.3 overs)
Nyasha Gwanzura 35* (80); Nahida Akter 3/30 (9.4 overs)		Fargana Hoque 53* (68); Esther Mbofana 1/30 (5.3 overs)

Bangladesh Women by 9 wickets
Queens Sports Club, Bulawayo
Umpires: Tafadzwa Musakwa (Zim) and Percival Sizara (Zim)
Player of the match: Fargana Hoque (Ban)

- Zimbabwe Women won the toss and elected to bat.
- Sharne Mayers (Zim) made her WODI debut.

=== 3rd WODI ===
15 November 2021
09:30
Scorecard

Zimbabwe; 72 (27.2 overs)	v	Bangladesh; 74/3 (18.2 overs)
Sharne Mayers 39 (61); Nahida Akter 5/21 (10 overs)		Murshida Khatun 39* (48); Esther Mbofana 1/12 (3 overs)

Bangladesh Women won by 7 wickets
Queens Sports Club, Bulawayo
Umpires: Stanley Gogwe (Zim) and Percival Sizara (Zim)
Player of the match: Nahida Akter (Ban)

- Zimbabwe Women won the toss and elected to bat.
- Fariha Trisna (Ban) made her WODI debut.
- Nahida Akter (Ban) took her first five-wicket haul in WODIs.
