= Cricket at the 2023 African Games =

Cricket tournament

- Venues: Achimota Oval, Accra
- Dates: 7–23 March 2024
- Teams: 8 (Men's); 8 (Women's)

Medalists
gold medal	M: Zimbabwe; W: Zimbabwe
silver medal	M: Namibia; W: South Africa
bronze medal	M: Uganda; W: Nigeria

Cricket at the 2023 African Games was held in Accra, Ghana, between 7 and 23 March 2024. Both men's and women's tournaments were held in Twenty20 International format. This was the first time that cricket is played at the African Games.

== Schedule ==
G	Group stage	½	Semifinals	B	Bronze medal match	F	Finals

Event↓/Date →
Event↓/Date →	7 Thu	8 Fri	9 Sat	10 Sun	11 Mon	12 Tue	13 Wed		14 Thu	15 Fri	16 Sat	17 Sun	18 Mon	19 Tue	20 Wed	21 Thu	22 Fri	23 Sat	
Women	G	G		G	½		B	F											
Men												G	G		G	½		B	F

== Medal summary ==
=== Medal table ===
Rank	Nation	Gold	Silver	Bronze	Total
1	Zimbabwe	2	0	0	2
2	Namibia	0	1	0	1
2	South Africa	0	1	0	1
4	Nigeria	0	0	1	1
4	Uganda	0	0	1	1
Totals (5 entries)		2	2	2	6

=== Results ===
Event	Gold	Silver	Bronze
Men	Zimbabwe; Brian Bennett; Johnathan Campbell; Takudzwa Chataira; Alex Falao; Trevor Gwandu; Kudakwashe Macheka; Clive Madande; Tadiwanashe Marumani; Wallace Mubayiwa; Ashley Mufandauya; Tony Munyonga; Rodney Mupfudza; Tashinga Musekiwa; Owen Muzondo; Nick Welch	Namibia; Jan Balt; Peter-Daniel Blignaut; Jack Brassell; Niko Davin; Shaun Fouché; Addo Iita; Junior Kariata; Handre Klazinge; JP Kotze; Malan Kruger; Dylan Leicher; Jan Nicol Loftie-Eaton; Ben Shikongo; Simon Shikongo; Gerhard Janse van Rensburg	Uganda; Fred Achelam; Bilal Hassan; Cyrus Kakuru; Cosmas Kyewuta; Ronald Lutaaya; Brian Masaba; Juma Miyagi; Roger Mukasa; Dinesh Nakrani; Robinson Obuya; Alpesh Ramjani; Henry Ssenyondo; Simon Ssesazi; Kenneth Waiswa
Women	Zimbabwe; Kudzai Chigora; Francisca Chipare; Chiedza Dhururu; Nyasha Gwanzura; Lindokuhle Mabhero; Precious Marange; Sharne Mayers; Audrey Mazvishaya; Pellagia Mujaji; Modester Mupachikwa; Mary-Anne Musonda; Kelis Ndhlovu; Josephine Nkomo; Nomvelo Sibanda; Loreen Tshuma	South Africa; Nobulumko Baneti; Jemma Botha; Annerie Dercksen; Jenna Evans; Gandhi Jafta; Leah Jones; Simone Lourens; Karabo Meso; Seshnie Naidu; Kayla Reyneke; Nondumiso Shangase; Miane Smit; Faye Tunnicliffe; Jané Winster; Caitlin Wyngaard	Nigeria; Blessing Etim; Rukayat Abdulrasak; Shola Adekunle; Peculiar Agboya; Christabel Chukwuonye; Favour Eseigbe; Sarah Etim; Victory Igbinedion; Abigail Igbobie; Esther Odunayo; Usen Peace; Lucky Piety; Rachael Samson; Esther Sandy; Salome Sunday; Lillian Udeh
