= Thailand women's cricket team in South Africa and Zimbabwe in 2021 =

International cricket tour

Thailand women's cricket team in Zimbabwe in 2021
	Zimbabwe women	Thailand women
- Dates: 18 – 30 August 2021
Captains	Mary-Anne Musonda	Naruemol Chaiwai

One Day International series
- Results: 4-match series drawn 2–2
Most runs	Mary-Anne Musonda (147)	Naruemol Chaiwai (195)
Most wickets	Josephine Nkomo (10)	Nattaya Boochatham (9)
- Player of the series: Josephine Nkomo (Zim)

Twenty20 International series
- Results: Thailand women won the 3-match series 2–1
Most runs	Chipo Mugeri-Tiripano (63)	Natthakan Chantham (110)
Most wickets	Loreen Tshuma (5)	Nattaya Boochatham (10)
- Player of the series: Nattaya Boochatham (Tha)

The Thailand women's cricket team toured South Africa and Zimbabwe in August and September 2021. The team first played four one-day matches and three Women's Twenty20 International (WT20I) matches against the Zimbabwe women's cricket team, before playing five one-day matches and three twenty-over matches against the South Africa Emerging team.

Zimbabwe won the first one-day match against Thailand by seven wickets, with unbeaten half-centuries from Josephine Nkomo and Mary-Anne Musonda. Thailand won the second match by 22 runs to level the series, after a half-century and a five-wicket haul from Nattaya Boochatham. In the third match, Thailand batted first and were reduced to 14/5 inside nine overs, before Naruemol Chaiwai went on to score an unbeaten century (100* runs in 133 balls). However, Zimbabwe went on to win the match by five wickets, with half-centuries from Chipo Mugeri-Tiripano and Modester Mupachikwa. Thailand won the fourth one-day match by five wickets, with the series being drawn 2–2.

In the WT20I series against Thailand, Zimbabwe won the opening match by one wicket, to record their fifteenth consecutive win in the format. Thailand won the second match by 53 runs to level the series, with Natthakan Chantham scoring an unbeaten 88. In the final match against Zimbabwe, Thailand won by 27 runs, winning the WT20I series 2–1.

In South Africa, the Emerging team won the first one-day match by 45 runs, with Thailand winning the next two matches to take a 2–1 lead with two matches to play. The South Africa Emerging team then won the fourth one-day match by 23 runs, to level the series with one game to play. The Emerging team won the fifth and final one-day match by five wickets to win the series 3–2. In the twenty-over series, the Emerging team won the opening match by 60 runs, with Khushi Mistry taking a five-wicket haul. Thailand won the second match by 30 runs to level the series with one match to play. Thailand won the final twenty-over match by seven wickets to win the series 2–1.

== Tour of Zimbabwe ==
=== Squads ===
Zimbabwe	Thailand
Mary-Anne Musonda (c); Christabel Chatonzwa; Chiedza Dhururu (wk); Tasmeen Granger; Nyasha Gwanzura; Precious Marange; Michelle Mavunga; Audrey Mazvishaya; Esther Mbofana; Chipo Mugeri-Tiripano; Modester Mupachikwa; Nomatter Mutasa; Ashley Ndiraya; Josephine Nkomo; Loryn Phiri; Nomvelo Sibanda; Loreen Tshuma	Naruemol Chaiwai (c); Nannapat Koncharoenkai (vc); Nattaya Boochatham; Natthakan Chantam; Sunida Chaturongrattana; Onnicha Kamchomphu; Rosenan Kanoh; Suleeporn Laomi; Wongpaka Liengprasert; Phannita Maya; Ratanaporn Padunglerd; Thipatcha Putthawong; Chanida Sutthiruang; Aphisara Suwanchonrathi; Sornnarin Tippoch

=== One-day series ===
==== 1st one-day match ====
18 August 2021
09:30
Scorecard

Thailand; 199/4 (50 overs)	v	Zimbabwe; 200/3 (45 overs)
Naruemol Chaiwai 67* (120); Josephine Nkomo 2/37 (10 overs)		Josephine Nkomo 57* (74); Ratanaporn Padunglerd 2/26 (8 overs)

Zimbabwe Women won by 7 wickets
Takashinga Cricket Club, Harare
Umpires: Forster Mutizwa (Zim) and Langton Rusere (Zim)
Player of the match: Josephine Nkomo (Zim)

- Zimbabwe Women won the toss and elected to field.

==== 2nd one-day match ====
20 August 2021
09:30
Scorecard

Thailand; 229/9 (50 overs)	v	Zimbabwe; 207/9 (50 overs)
Nattaya Boochatham 54 (58); Josephine Nkomo 5/35 (10 overs)		Mary-Anne Musonda 50 (88); Nattaya Boochatham 5/33 (9 overs)

Thailand Women won by 22 runs
Takashinga Cricket Club, Harare
Umpires: Forster Mutizwa (Zim) and Langton Rusere (Zim)
Player of the match: Nattaya Boochatham (Tha)

- Thailand Women won the toss and elected to bat.

==== 3rd one-day match ====
22 August 2021
09:30
Scorecard

Thailand; 189/7 (50 overs)	v	Zimbabwe; 192/5 (43.3 overs)
Naruemol Chaiwai 100* (133); Josephine Nkomo 3/42 (10 overs)		Chipo Mugeri-Tiripano 54 (75); Suleeporn Laomi 2/31 (8 overs)

Zimbabwe Women won by 5 wickets
Takashinga Cricket Club, Harare
Umpires: Forster Mutizwa (Zim) and Christopher Phiri (Zim)
Player of the match: Naruemol Chaiwai (Tha)

- Zimbabwe Women won the toss and elected to field.

==== 4th one-day match ====
24 August 2021
09:30
Scorecard

Zimbabwe; 212/8 (50 overs)	v	Thailand; 213/5 (46.1 overs)
Precious Marange 66 (76); Nattaya Boochatham 3/27 (9 overs)		Chanida Sutthiruang 52* (49); Christabel Chatonzwa 2/22 (7 overs)

Thailand Women won by 5 wickets
Takashinga Cricket Club, Harare
Umpires: Forster Mutizwa (Zim) and Christopher Phiri (Zim)
Player of the match: Precious Marange (Zim)

- Zimbabwe Women won the toss and elected to bat.

=== WT20I series ===
==== 1st WT20I ====
27 August 2021
11:30
Scorecard

Thailand; 104/4 (20 overs)	v	Zimbabwe; 107/9 (19.3 overs)
Nannapat Koncharoenkai 62* (53); Christabel Chatonzwa 2/18 (3 overs)		Chipo Mugeri-Tiripano 30 (30); Onnicha Kamchomphu 3/18 (4 overs); Nattaya Boochatham 3/18 (4 overs)

Zimbabwe Women won by 1 wicket
Takashinga Cricket Club, Harare
Umpires: Iknow Chabi (Zim) and Langton Rusere (Zim)
Player of the match: Christabel Chatonzwa (Zim)

- Zimbabwe Women won the toss and elected to field.

==== 2nd WT20I ====
28 August 2021
11:30
Scorecard

Thailand; 154/3 (20 overs)	v	Zimbabwe; 101 (19.3 overs)
Natthakan Chantham 88* (65); Loreen Tshuma 2/27 (4 overs)		Precious Marange 30 (29); Nattaya Boochatham 4/16 (3.3 overs)

Thailand Women won by 53 runs
Takashinga Cricket Club, Harare
Umpires: Iknow Chabi (Zim) and Forster Mutizwa (Zim)
Player of the match: Nattaya Boochatham (Zim)

- Thailand Women won the toss and elected to bat.
- Loreen Tshuma (Zim) made her WT20I debut.

==== 3rd WT20I ====
30 August 2021
11:30
Scorecard

Thailand; 134/5 (20 overs)	v	Zimbabwe; 107/7 (20 overs)
Chanida Sutthiruang 46* (28); Loreen Tshuma 3/14 (4 overs)		Chipo Mugeri-Tiripano 28 (17); Nattaya Boochatham 3/22 (4 overs)

Thailand Women won by 27 runs
Takashinga Cricket Club, Harare
Umpires: Forster Mutizwa (Zim) and Christopher Phiri (Zim)
Player of the match: Nattaya Boochatham (Tha)

- Thailand Women won the toss and elected to bat.
- Nyasha Gwanzura (Zim) made her WT20I debut.

== Tour of South Africa ==
Thailand women's cricket team in South Africa in 2021
	South Africa Emerging	Thailand women
- Dates: 5 – 19 September 2021
Captains	Andrie Steyn	Naruemol Chaiwai

One Day International series
- Results: South Africa Emerging won the 5-match series 3–2
Most runs	Faye Tunnicliffe (208)	Natthakan Chantam (344)
Most wickets	Leah Jones (10)	Nattaya Boochatham (14)

Twenty20 International series
- Results: Thailand women won the 3-match series 2–1
Most runs	Annerie Dercksen (71)	Nannapat Koncharoenkai (87)
Most wickets	Khushi Mistry (5)	Suleeporn Laomi (7)

=== Squads ===
South Africa Emerging	Thailand
Andrie Steyn (c); Micaela Andrews; Nobulumko Baneti; Nicole De Klerk; Annerie Dercksen; Alyssa Erxleben; Leah Jones; Tebogo Macheke; Palesa Mapoo; Khayakazi Mathe; Khushi Mistry; Kgomotso Rapoo; Saarah Smith; Delmi Tucker; Faye Tunnicliffe; Jane Winster	Naruemol Chaiwai (c); Nannapat Koncharoenkai (vc); Nattaya Boochatham; Natthakan Chantam; Sunida Chaturongrattana; Onnicha Kamchomphu; Rosenan Kanoh; Suleeporn Laomi; Wongpaka Liengprasert; Phannita Maya; Ratanaporn Padunglerd; Thipatcha Putthawong; Chanida Sutthiruang; Aphisara Suwanchonrathi; Sornnarin Tippoch

=== One-day series ===
==== 1st one-day match ====
5 September 2021
10:30
Scorecard

South Africa Emerging; 192 (45.1 overs)	v	Thailand; 147 (41.2 overs)
Faye Tunnicliffe 65 (86); Nattaya Boochatham 5/21 (7.1 overs)		Natthakan Chantam 34 (65); Khayakazi Mathe 3/35 (7 overs)

South Africa Emerging won by 45 runs
Senwes Park, Potchefstroom
Umpires: Murray Brown (SA) and Abongile Sodumo (SA)
Player of the match: Faye Tunnicliffe (South Africa Emerging)

- Thailand Women won the toss and elected to field.

==== 2nd one-day match ====
7 September 2021
10:30
Scorecard

Thailand; 277/6 (50 overs)	v	South Africa Emerging; 208 (46.3 overs)
Natthakan Chantam 113 (141); Leah Jones 3/54 (10 overs)		Annerie Dercksen 47 (76); Nattaya Boochatham 4/29 (8.3 overs)

Thailand Women won by 68 runs
Senwes Park, Potchefstroom
Umpires: Murray Brown (SA) and Mazizi Gampu (SA)
Player of the match: Natthakan Chantam (Tha)

- Thailand Women won the toss and elected to bat.

==== 3rd one-day match ====
9 September 2021
10:30
Scorecard

South Africa Emerging; 240 (49.2 overs)	v	Thailand; 243/5 (48.4 overs)
Faye Tunnicliffe 70 (87); Nattaya Boochatham 3/45 (9.2 overs)		Natthakan Chantham 120 (126); Nobulumko Baneti 3/59 (10 overs)

Thailand Women won by 5 wickets
Senwes Park, Potchefstroom
Umpires: Mazizi Gampu (SA) and Abongile Sodumo (SA)
Player of the match: Natthakan Chantham (Tha)

- South Africa Emerging won the toss and elected to bat.

==== 4th one-day match ====
11 September 2021
10:30
Scorecard

South Africa Emerging; 254/8 (50 overs)	v	Thailand; 231/8 (50 overs)
Andrie Steyn 79 (95); Suleeporn Laomi 3/66 (10 overs)		Naruemol Chaiwai 80 (104); Delmi Tucker 3/37 (10 overs)

South Africa Emerging won by 23 runs
Senwes Park, Potchefstroom
Umpires: Murray Brown (SA) and Abongile Sodumo (SA)

- South Africa Emerging won the toss and elected to bat.

==== 5th one-day match ====
13 September 2021
10:30
Scorecard

Thailand; 139 (32 overs)	v	South Africa Emerging; 140/5 (32.1 overs)
Natthakan Chantham 35 (38); Jane Winster 3/28 (7 overs)		Delmi Tucker 34* (28); Nattaya Boochatham 2/32 (9 overs)

South Africa Emerging won by 5 wickets
Senwes Park, Potchefstroom
Umpires: Murray Brown (SA) and Abongile Sodumo (SA)

- Thailand Women won the toss and elected to bat.

=== Twenty-over series ===
==== 1st twenty-over match ====
16 September 2021
13:00
Scorecard

South Africa Emerging; 151/4 (20 overs)	v	Thailand; 91 (18 overs)
Michaela Andrews 37 (29); Wongpaka Liengprasert 1/17 (3 overs)		Nattaya Boochatham 29 (20); Khushi Mistry 5/19 (4 overs)

South Africa Emerging won by 60 runs
Senwes Park, Potchefstroom
Umpires: Mazizi Gampu (SA) and Abongile Sodumo (SA)

- South Africa Emerging won the toss and elected to bat.

==== 2nd twenty-over match ====
17 September 2021
13:00
Scorecard

Thailand; 139/5 (20 overs)	v	South Africa Emerging; 109/8 (20 overs)
Nannapat Koncharoenkai 50 (42); Delmi Tucker 2/15 (3 overs)		Annerie Dercksen 43 (46); Sornnarin Tippoch 2/12 (4 overs)

Thailand Women won by 30 runs
Senwes Park, Potchefstroom
Umpires: Murray Brown (SA) and Mazizi Gampu (SA)

- Thailand Women won the toss and elected to bat.

==== 3rd twenty-over match ====
19 September 2021
13:00
Scorecard

South Africa Emerging; 84 (19.4 overs)	v	Thailand; 86/3 (16 overs)
Annerie Dercksen 17 (11); Suleeporn Laomi 4/12 (4 overs)		Natthakan Chantham 36* (39); Delmi Tucker 1/15 (4 overs)

Thailand Women won by 7 wickets
Senwes Park, Potchefstroom
Umpires: Murray Brown (SA) and Abongile Sodumo (SA)

- South Africa Emerging won the toss and elected to bat.
