= 2025 Kwibuka Women's T20 Tournament =

International cricket tournament

- Dates: 3 – 14 June 2025
- Administrator: Rwanda Cricket Association
- Cricket format: Twenty20 International
- Tournament format(s): Round-robin and play-offs
- Host: Rwanda
- Champions: Tanzania (3rd title)
- Runners-up: Zimbabwe XI
- Participants: 9
- Matches: 40
- Player of the series: (Rwanda) Henriette Ishimwe
- Most runs: (Tanzania) Neema Pius (275)
- Most wickets: (Rwanda) Henriette Ishimwe (20)

The 2025 Kwibuka Women's T20 Tournament was a Twenty20 International (T20I) cricket tournament that took place in Rwanda from 3–14 June 2025. The participating teams were Brazil, Cameroon, Malawi, Nigeria, Rwanda, Sierra Leone, Tanzania, Uganda and a Zimbabwe High Performance XI. The eleventh edition of the Kwibuka tournament commemorated the 31st anniversary of the 1994 genocide against the Tutsi. Uganda were the defending champions, having won the 2024 tournament.

The teams competed in a round-robin, after which the top four advanced to the semi-finals. Rwanda finished top of the round-robin stage with eight wins from nine matches.

Tanzania defeated Rwanda by 16 runs in one of the semi-finals, which was a low-scoring match. Uganda lost to the Zimbabwe High Performance XI by 1 run in the other semi-final, after collapsing from 83/2 to 92 all out. Tanzania defeated th Zimbabwe High Performance XI by 32 runs in the final.

== Squads ==
Brazil	Cameroon	Malawi	Nigeria	Rwanda	Sierra Leone	Tanzania	Uganda	Zimbabwe XI
Carolina Nascimento (c); Laura Cardoso (vc); Roberta Moretti Avery; Laura Agatha; Marianne Artur; Mayara dos Santos (wk); Lara Moisés; Evelyn Muller; Nicole Monteiro; Maria Ribeiro; Giulia Ribeiro; Ana Sabino; Maria Silva; Lindsay Vilas Boas (wk)	Michelle Ekani (c, wk); Sonita Akenji; Marguerite Bessala; Maeva Douma; Akago Eliane; Edwige Guehoada; Elsa Kana; Clemence Manidom; Cathy Mbelel; Bernadette Mbida; Jeanne Ngono; Olive Ranedoumoun; Madaleine Sissako (wk); Brenda Waluma	Euless Chiralile (c); Allinafe Alfonso; Christina Bwanali; Sophina Chinawe; Ketrina Chingaipe; Lidia Dimba; Eva Kabwere; Sugeni Kananji; Triphonia Luka (wk); Febbe Malefula; Lucy Malino; Praise Maziya (wk); Tadala Mpandakwaya; Esther Richard	Favour Eseigbe (c); Abigail Igbobie (vc, wk); Rukayat Abdulrasak; Adeshola Adekunle; Annointed Akhigbe; Muhibat Amusa; Christabel Chukwuonye; Omosigho Eguakun; Sarah Etim (wk); Usen Peace; Rachael Samson; Esther Sandy; Salome Sunday; Lillian Udeh	Marie Bimenyimana (c); Alice Ikuzwe; Georgette Ingabire; Rosine Irera; Henriette Ishimwe; Immaculee Muhawenimana; Belise Murekatete; Shakila Niyomuhoza; Rosette Shimwamana; Clarrisse Umutoniwase; Sylvia Usabyimana; Geovanis Uwase; Merveille Uwase (wk); Sarah Uwera (wk)	Aminata Kamara (c); Aisha Bangura; Celina Bull; Linda Bull; Fatu Conteh (wk); Alice Fillie; Ann Marie Kamara; Emma Kamara; Fatu Kamara; Zainab Kamara (wk); Jane Newland; Fatmata Parkinson; Patrica Pratt; Hussainatu Sawanneh; Marie Turay	Shufaa Mohamedi (c, wk); Saumu Hussein (wk); Sophia Jerome; Perice Kamunya; Fatuma Kibasu; Jenifer Kimaro; Sheila Kizito; Linda Massawe; Saum Mtae; Hudaa Omary; Getrude Mushi; Tabu Omary; Neema Pius; Agnes Qwele; Nasra Saidi; Mwanamvua Ushanga	Janet Mbabazi (c); Rita Musamali (vc); Sarah Akiteng; Prosscovia Alako; Kevin Amuge; Concy Aweko; Kevin Awino (wk); Esther Iloku; Phiona Kulume; Immaculate Nakisuuyi; Stephani Nampiina; Teddy Oyella; Sarah Tino; Sarah Walaza	Nomvelo Sibanda (c); Christabel Chatonzwa; Cathrine Chitombo; Chiedza Dhururu (wk); Nyasha Gwanzura; Lindokuhle Mabhera; Nokutenda Makaniwa; Michelle Mavunga; Natasha Mtomba; Passionate Munorwei; Salem Museka; Vimbai Mutingwindu; Kelly Ndiraya; Loryn Phiri; Loreen Tshuma

== Round-robin ==
=== Points table ===
Pos	Team	Pld	W	L	NR	Pts	NRR	Qualification
1	Rwanda	8	7	1	0	14	1.387	Advanced to the semi-finals
2	Uganda	8	6	2	0	12	1.696	Advanced to the semi-finals
3	Zimbabwe XI	8	6	2	0	12	1.414	Advanced to the semi-finals
4	Tanzania	8	5	3	0	10	2.403	Advanced to the semi-finals
5	Nigeria	8	5	3	0	10	0.518	
6	Brazil	8	4	4	0	8	0.012	
7	Malawi	8	1	7	0	2	−1.341	
8	Sierra Leone	8	1	7	0	2	−2.260	
9	Cameroon	8	1	7	0	2	−3.933	

Source: ESPNcricinfo

=== Fixtures ===
==== Day one ====
3 June 2025
09:30
Scorecard

Rwanda; 145/4 (20 overs)	v	Cameroon; 54 (20 overs)
Shakila Niyomuhoza 52* (45); Michelle Ekani 2/30 (4 overs)		Marguerite Bessala 16 (19); Marie Bimenyimana 3/5 (4 overs)

Rwanda won by 91 runs
Gahanga International Cricket Stadium, Kigali
Umpires: Veronique Iriho (Rwa) and Forster Mutizwa (Zim)
Player of the match: Marie Bimenyimana (Rwa)

- Cameroon won the toss and elected to field.

3 June 2025
09:45
Scorecard

Zimbabwe XI; 104/8 (20 overs)	v	Nigeria; 98/7 (20 overs)
Christabel Chatonzwa 28 (37); Rachael Samson 3/24 (3 overs)		Sarah Etim 19 (16); Passionate Munorwei 3/20 (4 overs)

Zimbabwe XI won by 6 runs
Gahanga B Ground, Kigali
Umpires: Simon Kintu (Uga) and Gaston Niyibizi (Rwa)
Player of the match: Passionate Munorwei (Zim)

- Nigeria won the toss and elected to field.

3 June 2025
13:30
Scorecard

Tanzania; 152/4 (20 overs)	v	Sierra Leone; 47 (17.5 overs)
Neema Pius 77* (62); Emma Kamara 2/35 (4 overs)		Linda Bull 7 (12); Fatuma Kibasu 4/6 (2.5 overs)

Tanzania won by 105 runs
Gahanga International Cricket Stadium, Kigali
Umpires: Vicky Prajapati (Rwa) and Remy Singizwa (Rwa)
Player of the match: Neema Pius (Tan)

- Tanzania won the toss and elected to bat.
- Jenifer Kimaro (Tan) made her T20I debut.

3 June 2025
13:45
Scorecard

Malawi; 101/6 (20 overs)	v	Brazil; 102/3 (16.5 overs)
Lidia Dimba 27 (33); Maria Ribeiro 3/19 (4 overs)		Roberta Avery 35* (46); Sugeni Kananji 1/14 (3.5 overs)

Brazil won by 7 wickets
Gahanga B Ground, Kigali
Umpires: Damascene Hagenimana (Rwa) and Veronique Iriho (Rwa)
Player of the match: Maria Ribeiro (Bra)

- Brazil won the toss and elected to field.
- Christina Bwanali, Euless Chiralile and Esther Richard (Mwi) all made their T20I debuts.

==== Day two ====
4 June 2025
09:30
Scorecard

Rwanda; 135/3 (20 overs)	v	Sierra Leone; 80/8 (20 overs)
Henriette Ishimwe 67* (51); Linda Bull 1/16 (4 overs)		Aminata Kamara 26 (47); Sylvia Usabyimana 3/17 (4 overs)

Rwanda won by 55 runs
Gahanga International Cricket Stadium, Kigali
Umpires: Veronique Iriho (Rwa) and Simon Kintu (Uga)
Player of the match: Henriette Ishimwe (Rwa)

- Rwanda won the toss and elected to bat.

4 June 2025
09:45
Scorecard

Cameroon; 42 (19.4 overs)	v	Uganda; 43/0 (4.5 overs)
Jeanne Ngono 10 (24); Stephani Nampiina 3/3 (3.4 overs)		Janet Mbabazi 26* (19)

Uganda won by 10 wickets
Gahanga B Ground, Kigali
Umpires: Damascene Hagenimana (Rwa) and Gaston Niyibizi (Rwa)
Player of the match: Stephani Nampiina (Uga)

- Uganda won the toss and elected to field.
- Kevin Amuge and Sarah Tino (Uga) both made their T20I debuts.

4 June 2025
13:30
Scorecard

Nigeria; 92 (20 overs)	v	Brazil; 59/4 (12 overs)
Muhibat Amusa 21 (26); Marianne Artur 2/9 (3 overs)		Roberta Moretti Avery 27* (31); Rachael Samson 1/7 (2 overs)

Brazil won by 5 runs (DLS method)
Gahanga International Cricket Stadium, Kigali
Umpires: Forster Mutizwa (Zim) and Vicky Prajapati (Rwa)
Player of the match: Roberta Moretti Avery (Bra)

- Brazil won the toss and elected to field.
- No further play was possible due to rain.
- Muhibat Amusa (Nga) made her T20I debut.

4 June 2025
13:45
Scorecard

Tanzania; 121/6 (20 overs)	v	Malawi; 57/5 (9 overs)
Neema Pius 45 (41); Praise Maziya 2/16 (4 overs)		Sugeni Kananji 19 (12); Agnes Qwele 1/7 (2 overs)

Tanzania won by 8 runs (DLS method)
Gahanga B Ground, Kigali
Umpires: Simon Kintu (Uga) and Remy Singizwa (Rwa)
Player of the match: Neema Pius (Tan)

- Tanzania won the toss and elected to bat.
- No further play was possible due to rain.
- Eva Kabwere (Mwi) made her T20I debut.

==== Day three ====
5 June 2025
09:30
Scorecard

Uganda; 105/5 (20 overs)	v	Zimbabwe XI; 101/9 (20 overs)
Janet Mbabazi 26 (27); Christabel Chatonzwa 2/8 (4 overs)		Christabel Chatonzwa 27 (20); Concy Aweko 2/12 (4 overs)

Uganda won by 4 runs
Gahanga International Cricket Stadium, Kigali
Umpires: Damascene Hagenimana (Rwa) and Forster Mutizwa (Zim)
Player of the match: Janet Mbabazi (Uga)

- Zimbabwe XI won the toss and elected to field.

5 June 2025
09:45
Scorecard

Cameroon; 107/5 (20 overs)	v	Sierra Leone; 84 (18.2 overs)
Bernadette Mbida 33 (37); Linda Bull 3/21 (4 overs)		Celina Bull 35 (32); Maeva Douma 3/8 (4 overs)

Cameroon won by 23 runs
Gahanga B Ground, Kigali
Umpires: Veronique Iriho (Rwa) and Remy Singizwa (Rwa)
Player of the match: Maeva Douma (Cmr)

- Sierra Leone won the toss and elected to field.

5 June 2025
13:30
Scorecard

Rwanda; 109/4 (20 overs)	v	Malawi; 60 (17.4 overs)
Henriette Ishimwe 35* (28); Esther Richard 1/15 (2 overs)		Sugeni Kananji 17* (25); Alice Ikuzwe 4/9 (4 overs)

Rwanda won by 49 runs
Gahanga International Cricket Stadium, Kigali
Umpires: Gaston Niyibizi (Rwa) and Vicky Prajapati (Rwa)
Player of the match: Henriette Ishimwe (Rwa)

- Malawi won the toss and elected to field.

5 June 2025
13:45
Scorecard

Tanzania; 82/9 (20 overs)	v	Nigeria; 83/8 (20 overs)
Neema Pius 21 (21); Usen Peace 2/9 (4 overs)		Favour Eseigbe 37 (49); Sophia Jerome 3/11 (4 overs)

Nigeria won by 2 wickets
Gahanga B Ground, Kigali
Umpires: Simon Kintu (Uga) and Remy Singizwa (Rwa)
Player of the match: Usen Peace (Nga)

- Tanzania won the toss and elected to bat.

==== Day four ====
6 June 2025
09:30
Scorecard

Zimbabwe XI; 151/5 (20 overs)	v	Brazil; 89/3 (20 overs)
Chiedza Dhururu 55 (59); Lindsay Vilas Boas 2/28 (4 overs)		Lindsay Vilas Boas 29 (35); Lindokuhle Mabhera 2/7 (3 overs)

Zimbabwe XI won by 62 runs
Gahanga International Cricket Stadium, Kigali
Umpires: Veronique Iriho (Rwa) and Simon Kintu (Uga)
Player of the match: Chiedza Dhururu (Zim)

- Brazil won the toss and elected to field.

6 June 2025
09:45
Scorecard

Sierra Leone; 32 (11.1 overs)	v	Uganda; 33/0 (4.5 overs)
Hussainatu Sawanneh 8* (14); Kevin Amuge 5/19 (4 overs)		Janet Mbabazi 19* (19)

Uganda won by 10 wickets
Gahanga B Ground, Kigali
Umpires: Vicky Prajapati (Rwa) and Remy Singizwa (Rwa)
Player of the match: Kevin Amuge (Uga)

- Uganda won the toss and elected to field.
- Teddy Oyella (Uga) made her T20I debut.
- Kevin Amuge (Uga) took her first five-wicket haul in T20Is.

6 June 2025
13:30
Scorecard

Cameroon; 72 (19 overs)	v	Malawi; 73/4 (13 overs)
Michelle Ekani 28 (45); Christina Bwanali 2/7 (2 overs)		Lidia Dimba 25 (21); Olive Ranedoumoun 2/12 (3 overs)

Malawi won by 6 wickets
Gahanga International Cricket Stadium, Kigali
Umpires: Gaston Niyibizi (Rwa) and Vicky Prajapati (Rwa)
Player of the match: Lidia Dimba (Mwi)

- Malawi won the toss and elected to field.

6 June 2025
13:45
Scorecard

Rwanda; 114/7 (20 overs)	v	Nigeria; 74 (17.3 overs)
Alice Ikuzwe 37* (23); Annointed Akhigbe 3/32 (4 overs)		Esther Sandy 20 (20); Henriette Ishimwe 3/10 (3.3 overs)

Rwanda won by 40 runs
Gahanga B Ground, Kigali
Umpires: Damascene Hagenimana (Rwa) and Forster Mutizwa (Zim)
Player of the match: Alice Ikuzwe (Rwa)

- Rwanda won the toss and elected to bat.

==== Day five ====
7 June 2025
09:30
Scorecard

Brazil; 80/9 (20 overs)	v	Uganda; 81/3 (12.1 overs)
Roberta Moretti Avery 23 (36); Janet Mbabazi 4/16 (4 overs)		Immaculate Nakisuuyi 34* (27); Nicole Monteiro 1/4 (1 over)

Uganda won by 7 wickets
Gahanga International Cricket Stadium, Kigali
Umpires: Forster Mutizwa (Zim) and Gaston Niyibizi (Rwa)
Player of the match: Janet Mbabazi (Uga)

- Uganda won the toss and elected to field.

7 June 2025
09:45
Scorecard

Malawi; 74 (19.1 overs)	v	Sierra Leone; 77/6 (15.2 overs)
Sugeni Kananji 19 (14); Emma Kamara 4/7 (4 overs)		Zainab Kamara 28 (23); Eva Kabwere 3/16 (4 overs)

Sierra Leone won by 4 wickets
Gahanga B Ground, Kigali
Umpires: Vicky Prajapati (Rwa) and Remy Singizwa (Rwa)
Player of the match: Emma Kamara (Sle)

- Sierra Leone won the toss and elected to field.

7 June 2025
13:30
Scorecard

Tanzania; 103/5 (20 overs)	v	Zimbabwe XI; 64/1 (9.2 overs)
Neema Pius 52 (59); Nyasha Gwanzura 2/9 (2 overs)		Nyasha Gwanzura 34* (24)

Zimbabwe XI won by 9 wickets (DLS method)
Gahanga International Cricket Stadium, Kigali
Umpires: Simon Kintu (Uga) and Gaston Niyibizi (Rwa)
Player of the match: Nyasha Gwanzura (Zim)

- Zimbabwe XI won the toss and elected to field.
- Zimbabwe XI were set a revised target of 61 runs in 10 overs due to rain.

7 June 2025
13:45
Scorecard

Nigeria; 140/4 (20 overs)	v	Cameroon; 36/6 (9 overs)
Salome Sunday 53* (35); Madaleine Sissako 1/22 (2 overs)		Elsa Kana 18 (20); Muhibat Amusa 2/4 (2 overs)

Nigeria won by 38 runs (DLS method)
Gahanga B Ground, Kigali
Umpires: Damascene Hagenimana (Rwa) and Veronique Iriho (Rwa)
Player of the match: Muhibat Amusa (Nga)

- Nigeria won the toss and elected to bat.
- Cameroon were set a revised target of 75 runs in 9 overs due to rain.

==== Day six ====
8 June 2025
09:30
Scorecard

Uganda; 103/6 (20 overs)	v	Malawi; 53 (18 overs)
Kevin Awino 31 (47); Lucy Malino 2/14 (3 overs)		Lidia Dimba 29 (37); Stephani Nampiina 6/8 (4 overs)

Uganda won by 50 runs
Gahanga International Cricket Stadium, Kigali
Umpires: Simon Kintu (Uga) and Forster Mutizwa (Zim)
Player of the match: Stephani Nampiina (Uga)

- Malawi won the toss and elected to field.

8 June 2025
09:45
Scorecard

Brazil; 75 (17.3 overs)	v	Tanzania; 76/1 (9.1 overs)
Laura Cardoso 17 (25); Perice Kamunya 2/11 (4 overs)		Fatuma Kibasu 47 (25); Marianne Artur 1/17 (2 overs)

Tanzania won by 9 wickets
Gahanga B Ground, Kigali
Umpires: Gaston Niyibizi (Rwa) and Vicky Prajapati (Rwa)
Player of the match: Fatuma Kibasu (Tan)

- Tanzania won the toss and elected to field.

8 June 2025
13:30
Scorecard

Nigeria; 104 (19.4 overs)	v	Sierra Leone; 68 (20 overs)
Muhibat Amusa 23 (28); Celina Bull 2/10 (1.4 overs)		Emma Kamara 40* (58); Muhibat Amusa 2/7 (4 overs)

Nigeria won by 36 runs
Gahanga International Cricket Stadium, Kigali
Umpires: Damascene Hagenimana (Rwa) and Veronique Iriho (Rwa)
Player of the match: Muhibat Amusa (Nga)

- Nigeria won the toss and elected to bat.
- Omosigho Eguakun (Nga) made her T20I debut.

8 June 2025
13:45
Scorecard

Zimbabwe XI; 99/8 (20 overs)	v	Rwanda; 103/4 (18.4 overs)
Christabel Chatonzwa 41 (37); Henriette Ishimwe 4/15 (4 overs)		Marie Bimenyimana 29 (37); Michelle Mavunga 2/18 (2 overs)

Rwanda won by 8 wickets
Gahanga B Ground, Kigali
Umpires: Forster Mutizwa (Zim) and Remy Singizwa (Rwa)
Player of the match: Henriette Ishimwe (Rwa)

- Zimbabwe XI won the toss and elected to bat.

==== Day seven ====
10 June 2025
09:30
Scorecard

Uganda; 99/6 (20 overs)	v	Tanzania; 79 (18 overs)
Janet Mbabazi 34 (32); Neema Pius 2/18 (4 overs); Mwanamvua Ushanga 2/18 (4 overs)		Neema Pius 19 (21); Stephani Nampiina 2/10 (2 overs)

Uganda won by 20 runs
Gahanga International Cricket Stadium, Kigali
Umpires: Gaston Niyibizi (Rwa) and Vicky Prajapati (Rwa)
Player of the match: Janet Mbabazi (Uga)

- Tanzania won the toss and elected to field.

10 June 2025
09:45
Scorecard

Nigeria; 107 (19.3 overs)	v	Malawi; 61/9 (20 overs)
Lillian Udeh 21* (16); Lidia Dimba 3/15 (4 overs)		Sugeni Kananji 12 (12); Muhibat Amusa 4/18 (4 overs)

Nigeria won by 46 runs
Gahanga B Ground, Kigali
Umpires: Damascene Hagenimana (Rwa) and Simon Kintu (Uga)
Player of the match: Muhibat Amusa (Nga)

- Malawi won the toss and elected to field.

10 June 2025
13:30
Scorecard

Zimbabwe XI; 163/6 (20 overs)	v	Cameroon; 75/8 (20 overs)
Chiedza Dhururu 52 (44); Maeva Douma 3/24 (3 overs)		Brenda Waluma 39 (50); Nomvelo Sibanda 2/15 (4 overs)

Zimbabwe XI won by 88 runs
Gahanga International Cricket Stadium, Kigali
Umpires: Damascene Hagenimana (Rwa) and Veronique Iriho (Rwa)
Player of the match: Nyasha Gwanzura (Zim)

- Zimbabwe XI won the toss and elected to bat.

10 June 2025
13:45
Scorecard

Rwanda; 96 (20 overs)	v	Brazil; 88/6 (20 overs)
Marie Bimenyimana 34 (38); Maria Ribeiro 3/22 (4 overs)		Laura Cardoso 38 (50); Rosine Irera 2/17 (4 overs)

Rwanda won by 8 runs
Gahanga B Ground, Kigali
Umpires: Forster Mutizwa (Zim) and Remy Singizwa (Rwa)
Player of the match: Rosine Irera (Rwa)

- Brazil won the toss and elected to field.

==== Day eight ====
11 June 2025
09:30
Scorecard

Nigeria; 73/9 (20 overs)	v	Uganda; 69 (20 overs)
Muhibat Amusa 30 (52); Janet Mbabazi 4/16 (4 overs)		Esther Iloku 15 (30); Annointed Akhigbe 3/11 (4 overs)

Nigeria won by 4 runs
Gahanga International Cricket Stadium, Kigali
Umpires: Veronique Iriho (Rwa) and Vicky Prajapati (Rwa)
Player of the match: Annointed Akhigbe (Nga)

- Uganda won the toss and elected to field.

11 June 2025
09:45
Scorecard

Rwanda; 74 (20 overs)	v	Tanzania; 78/3 (11.2 overs)
Merveille Uwase 22 (33); Agnes Qwele 4/7 (4 overs)		Fatuma Kibasu 41* (37); Henriette Ishimwe 2/15 (2.2 overs)

Tanzania won by 7 wickets
Gahanga B Ground, Kigali
Umpires: Simon Kintu (Uga) and Forster Mutizwa (Zim)
Player of the match: Agnes Qwele (Tan)

- Rwanda won the toss and elected to bat.

11 June 2025
13:30
Scorecard

Brazil; 156/7 (20 overs)	v	Cameroon; 44 (13.4 overs)
Ana Sabino 43 (32); Maeva Douma 2/18 (3 overs)		Bernadette Mbida 18 (23); Maria Ribeiro 3/9 (4 overs)

Brazil won by 112 runs
Gahanga International Cricket Stadium, Kigali
Umpires: Gaston Niyibizi (Rwa) and Vicky Prajapati (Rwa)
Player of the match: Maria Ribeiro (Bra)

- Cameroon won the toss and elected to field.

11 June 2025
13:45
Scorecard

Sierra Leone; 108/3 (20 overs)	v	Zimbabwe XI; 114/1 (15.5 overs)
Emma Kamara 31* (43); Nomvelo Sibanda 1/10 (4 overs)		Loreen Tshuma 59* (57); Linda Bull 1/27 (2.5 overs)

Zimbabwe XI won by 9 wickets
Gahanga B Ground, Kigali
Umpires: Damascene Hagenimana (Rwa) and Remy Singizwa (Rwa)
Player of the match: Loreen Tshuma (Zim)

- Sierra Leone won the toss and elected to bat.

==== Day nine ====
12 June 2025
09:30
Scorecard

Tanzania; 172/3 (20 overs)	v	Cameroon; 53 (18.2 overs)
Fatuma Kibasu 59 (56); Clemence Manidom 1/15 (1 over)		Madaleine Sissako 11 (31); Tabu Omary 4/13 (4 overs)

Tanzania won by 119 runs
Gahanga International Cricket Stadium, Kigali
Umpires: Gaston Niyibizi (Rwa) and Remy Singizwa (Rwa)
Player of the match: Fatuma Kibasu (Tan)

- Tanzania won the toss and elected to bat.

12 June 2025
09:45
Scorecard

Uganda; 119/6 (2 overs)	v	Rwanda; 120/5 (18.4 overs)
Immaculate Nakisuuyi 44 (45); Henriette Ishimwe 3/23 (4 overs)		Marie Bimenyimana 46 (44); Stephani Nampiina 2/21 (4 overs)

Rwanda won by 5 wickets
Gahanga B Ground, Kigali
Umpires: Simon Kintu (Uga) and Forster Mutizwa (Zim)
Player of the match: Henriette Ishimwe (Rwa)

- Rwanda won the toss and elected to field.

12 June 2025
13:30
Scorecard

Zimbabwe XI; 125/7 (20 overs)	v	Malawi; 95/9 (20 overs)
Nyasha Gwanzura 34 (37); Eva Kabwere 4/15 (4 overs)		Sophina Chinawe 21 (20); Nyasha Gwanzura 2/11 (3 overs)

Zimbabwe XI won by 30 runs
Gahanga International Cricket Stadium, Kigali
Umpires: Gaston Niyibizi (Rwa) and Vicky Prajapati (Rwa)
Player of the match: Nyasha Gwanzura (Zim)

- Malawi won the toss and elected to field.

12 June 2025
13:45
Scorecard

Sierra Leone; 85/7 (20 overs)	v	Brazil; 87/2 (13.4 overs)
Aminata Kamara 25* (27); Lindsay Vilas Boas 4/15 (4 overs)		Laura Agatha 52* (39); Celina Bull 1/22 (3.4 overs)

Brazil won by 8 wickets
Gahanga B Ground, Kigali
Umpires: Damascene Hagenimana (Rwa) and Veronique Iriho (Rwa)
Player of the match: Lindsay Vilas Boas (Bra)

- Sierra Leone won the toss and elected to bat.

== Semi-finals ==
13 June 2025
09:30
Scorecard

Tanzania; 59 (15 overs)	v	Rwanda; 43 (17.2 overs)
Saum Mtae 15 (17); Marie Bimenyimana 5/6 (3 overs)		Rosette Shimwamana 15 (28); Agnes Qwele 4/12 (4 overs)

Tanzania won by 16 runs
Gahanga International Cricket Stadium, Kigali
Umpires: Simon Kintu (Uga) and Gaston Niyibizi (Rwa)
Player of the match: Agnes Qwele (Tan)

- Rwanda won the toss and elected to field.

13 June 2025
09:45
Scorecard

Zimbabwe XI; 93/8 (20 overs)	v	Uganda; 92 (19.1 overs)
Loryn Phiri 32* (20); Concy Aweko 3/10 (4 overs)		Esther Iloku 54 (49); Nomvelo Sibanda 2/17 (4 overs)

Zimbabwe XI won by 1 run
Gahanga B Ground, Kigali
Umpires: Damascene Hagenimana (Rwa) and Remy Singizwa (Rwa)
Player of the match: Nomvelo Sibanda (Zim)

- Uganda won the toss and elected to field.

== Third place play-off ==
14 June 2025
09:30
Scorecard

Uganda; 107/5 (20 overs)	v	Rwanda; 87/7 (20 overs)
Immaculate Nakisuuyi 29 (31); Henriette Ishimwe 2/23 (4 overs)		Clarrisse Umutoniwase 29 (25); Sarah Tino 3/20 (4 overs)

Uganda won by 20 runs
Gahanga B Ground, Kigali
Umpires: Simon Kintu (Uga) and Vicky Prajapati (Rwa)
Player of the match: Sarah Tino (Uga)

- Rwanda won the toss and elected to field.

== Final ==
14 June 2025
13:30
Scorecard

Tanzania; 99/6 (20 overs)	v	Zimbabwe XI; 67 (19.3 overs)
Agnes Qwele 30 (37); Michelle Mavunga 2/23 (4 overs)		Nyasha Gwanzura 45* (54); Mwanamvua Ushanga 4/12 (4 overs)

Tanzania won by 32 runs
Gahanga International Cricket Stadium, Kigali
Umpires: Veronique Iriho (Rwa) and Forster Mutizwa (Zim)
Player of the match: Mwanamvua Ushanga (Tan)

- Tanzania won the toss and elected to bat.
