= Fifty50 Challenge =

Zimbabwean women's cricket competition

- Countries: Zimbabwe
- Administrator: Zimbabwe Cricket
- Format: Limited overs cricket (50 overs per side)
- First edition: 2020–21
- Latest edition: 2024
- Tournament format: Double round-robin
- Number of teams: 4
- Current champion: Eagles (3rd title)
- Most successful: Eagles (3 titles)

The Fifty50 Challenge is a women's domestic one-day cricket competition organised by Zimbabwe Cricket. The competition began in the 2020–21 season, and sees four teams competing in 50-over matches.

Eagles are the current holders, winning the last two titles. The competition runs alongside the Women's T20 Cup.

== History ==
The tournament began in October 2020, running alongside the Women's T20 Cup. The inception of the tournament was described by its founders, Zimbabwe Cricket, as "historic", becoming the first domestic women's competition to be played in Zimbabwe since the 2008–09 Inter-Provincial Tournament, which was the only previous such tournament.

The tournament saw four teams, Eagles, Mountaineers, Rhinos and Tuskers compete in a double round-robin group stage, with the top two sides qualifying for the final. Mountaineers won the group on Net Run Rate, and went on to beat Rhinos in the final to become the inaugural winners of the competition.

The second edition of the tournament began in February 2022, with the same format and teams competing. Eagles won the tournament to claim their first one-day title, beating Rhinos by 167 runs in the final.

The third edition of the tournament began in February 2023, operating as a double round-robin group without a final. Eagles won the tournament, their second in a row, edging out Rhinos on Net Run Rate.

== Teams ==
Team	Wins	Runners-up
Eagles	3	0
Mountaineers	1	0
Rhinos	0	3
Tuskers	0	1

== Results ==
Season	Winner	Runner-up	Leading run-scorer	Leading wicket-taker	Ref
2020–21	Mountaineers	Rhinos	Josephine Nkomo (Rhinos) 294	Francesca Chipare (Mountaineers) 19	
2021–22	Eagles	Rhinos	Josephine Nkomo (Rhinos) 268	Michelle Mavunga (Eagles) 15	
2022–23	Eagles	Rhinos	Ashley Ndiraya (Rhinos) 246	Nomatter Mutasa (Rhinos) 15	
2024	Eagles	Tuskers	Chipo Mugeri-Tiripano (Mountaineers) (248)	Nomvelo Sibanda (Tuskers) (17)	

== See also ==
- Women's T20 Cup
- Pro50 Championship
