= Pakistan women's cricket team in Zimbabwe in 2020–21 =

International cricket tour

	Zimbabwe women	Pakistan women
- Dates: 9 – 20 February 2021
Captains	Mary-Anne Musonda	Javeria Khan

Twenty20 International series

The Pakistan women's cricket team toured Zimbabwe to play against the Zimbabwe women's cricket team in February 2021. The tour was scheduled to consist of three 50-over matches and three Women's Twenty20 Internationals (WT20Is). The tour immediately followed Pakistan's tour of South Africa. Zimbabwe's last international fixtures were in May 2019, in the 2019 ICC Women's Qualifier Africa tournament. In late January 2021, Zimbabwe's Sports and Recreation Commission gave its approval for the tour to take place.

At the time of the tour, Zimbabwe did not have Women's One Day International (WODI) status, so the 50-over matches were not classed as such. Ahead of the tour Zimbabwe's coach, Adam Chifo, said that one of the aims would be for the team to eventually gain WODI status. On 5 February 2021, the Pakistan women's team arrived in Harare for their first ever tour of the country.

Pakistan won the first 50-over match, beating Zimbabwe by 178 runs. However, on 11 February 2021, the tour was ended abruptly. Commencing on 13 February 2021, the airline Emirates introduced new travel policies on flights from Harare to Pakistan, resulting in the Pakistan team flying home ahead of the new restrictions taking effect.

== Squads ==
WT20Is
Zimbabwe	Pakistan
Mary-Anne Musonda (c); Christabel Chatonzwa; Francisca Chipare; Chiedza Dhururu; Tasmeen Granger; Precious Marange; Audrey Mazvishaya; Esther Mbofana; Pellagia Mujaji; Modester Mupachikwa; Ashley Ndiraya; Kelis Ndhlovu; Josephine Nkomo; Loryn Phiri; Nomvelo Sibanda	Javeria Khan (c); Muneeba Ali; Anam Amin; Aiman Anwer; Diana Baig; Nida Dar; Sadia Iqbal; Kainat Imtiaz; Nahida Khan; Ayesha Naseem; Sidra Nawaz (wk); Aliya Riaz; Fatima Sana; Nashra Sandhu; Syeda Aroob Shah; Omaima Sohail; Ayesha Zafar

== 50-over series ==
=== 1st 50-over match ===
9 February 2021
09:00
Scorecard

Pakistan; 255/6 (50 overs)	v	Zimbabwe; 77 (34.1 overs)
Javeria Khan 81 (116); Nomvelo Sibanda 2/28 (8 overs)		Pellagia Mujaji 16 (40); Sadia Iqbal 2/8 (5 overs)

Pakistan Women won by 178 runs
Harare Sports Club, Harare
Umpires: Iknow Chabi (Zim) and Langton Rusere (Zim)
Player of the match: Javeria Khan (Pak)

- Zimbabwe Women won the toss and elected to field.

=== 2nd 50-over match ===
12 February 2021
09:00
Scorecard

Zimbabwe	v	Pakistan

Harare Sports Club, Harare

=== 3rd 50-over match ===
14 February 2021
09:00
Scorecard

Zimbabwe	v	Pakistan

Harare Sports Club, Harare

== WT20I series ==
=== 1st WT20I ===
17 February 2021
13:30
Scorecard

Zimbabwe	v	Pakistan

Harare Sports Club, Harare

=== 2nd WT20I ===
19 February 2021
13:30
Scorecard

Zimbabwe	v	Pakistan

Harare Sports Club, Harare

=== 3rd WT20I ===
20 February 2021
13:30
Scorecard

Zimbabwe	v	Pakistan

Harare Sports Club, Harare
