= Ireland women's cricket team in Zimbabwe in 2021–22 =

International cricket tour

	Zimbabwe Women	Ireland Women
- Dates: 5 – 11 October 2021
Captains	Mary-Anne Musonda	Laura Delany

One Day International series
- Results: Ireland Women won the 4-match series 3–1
Most runs	Mary-Anne Musonda (169)	Gaby Lewis (263)
Most wickets	Josephine Nkomo (4)	Cara Murray (8)
- Player of the series: Gaby Lewis (Ire)

The Ireland women's cricket team played four Women's One Day Internationals (WODIs) against the Zimbabwe women's cricket team in October 2021. The matches were used by both teams for their preparation for the 2021 Women's Cricket World Cup Qualifier tournament, also held in Zimbabwe in November and December 2021. They were the first WODI matches to be played by Ireland since June 2018, when they hosted New Zealand, and the first ever WODI matches to be played by Zimbabwe since they were granted WODI status by the International Cricket Council (ICC) in April 2021.

Zimbabwe won the opening match of the series by four wickets, with their captain Mary-Anne Musonda scoring an unbeaten century. Ireland won the second match by 80 runs to level the series. Ireland won the third WODI by eight wickets to go 2–1 in the series with one match to play. Ireland then won the final match by 85 runs to win the series 3–1. In the final match, Ireland's Amy Hunter became the youngest player, male or female, to score an ODI century.

== Squads ==
WODIs
Zimbabwe	Ireland
Mary-Anne Musonda (c); Francisca Chipare; Chiedza Dhururu (wk); Tasmeen Granger; Nyasha Gwanzura; Precious Marange; Audrey Mazvishaya; Esther Mbofana; Pellagia Mujaji; Modester Mupachikwa; Ashley Ndiraya; Josephine Nkomo; Loryn Phiri; Nomvelo Sibanda; Loreen Tshuma	Laura Delany (c); Zara Craig; Georgina Dempsey; Sarah Forbes; Amy Hunter; Shauna Kavanagh; Gaby Lewis; Sophie MacMahon; Jane Maguire; Cara Murray; Leah Paul; Orla Prendergast; Celeste Raack; Rebecca Stokell; Mary Waldron

== WODI series ==
=== 1st WODI ===
5 October 2021
09:30
Scorecard

Ireland; 253/8 (50 overs)	v	Zimbabwe; 254/6 (43.5 overs)
Laura Delany 88 (81); Josephine Nkomo 2/46 (9 overs)		Mary-Anne Musonda 103* (114); Cara Murray 2/46 (8 overs)

Zimbabwe Women won by 4 wickets
Harare Sports Club, Harare
Umpires: Iknow Chabi (Zim) and Stanley Gogwe (Zim)
Player of the match: Mary-Anne Musonda (Zim)

- Zimbabwe Women won the toss and elected to field.
- Chiedza Dhururu, Precious Marange, Esther Mbofana, Pellagia Mujaji, Modester Mupachikwa, Mary-Anne Musonda, Ashley Ndiraya, Josephine Nkomo, Loryn Phiri, Nomvelo Sibanda, Loreen Tshuma (Zim), Georgina Dempsey, Amy Hunter, Orla Prendergast and Celeste Raack (Ire) all made their WODI debuts.
- Mary-Anne Musonda (Zim) scored her first century in WODIs.

=== 2nd WODI ===
7 October 2021
09:30
Scorecard

Ireland; 286/7 (50 overs)	v	Zimbabwe; 206/9 (50 overs)
Leah Paul 95 (118); Josephine Nkomo 1/33 (10 overs)		Josephine Nkomo 70* (86); Cara Murray 3/56 (10)

Ireland Women won by 80 runs
Harare Sports Club, Harare
Umpires: Iknow Chabi (Zim) and Stanley Gogwe (Zim)
Player of the match: Leah Paul (Ire)

- Zimbabwe Women won the toss and elected to field.
- Jane Maguire (Ire) made her WODI debut.

=== 3rd WODI ===
9 October 2021
09:30
Scorecard

Zimbabwe; 178 (47 overs)	v	Ireland; 179/2 (39 overs)
Mary-Anne Musonda 26 (22); Celeste Raack 3/34 (10 overs)		Gaby Lewis 96* (129); Tasmeen Granger 2/53 (10 overs)

Ireland Women won by 8 wickets
Harare Sports Club, Harare
Umpires: Iknow Chabi (Zim) and Percival Sizara (Zim)
Player of the match: Gaby Lewis (Ire)

- Zimbabwe Women won the toss and elected to bat.
- Tasmeen Granger, Nyasha Gwanzura and Audrey Mazvishaya (Zim) all made their WODI debuts.

=== 4th WODI ===
11 October 2021
09:30
Scorecard

Ireland; 312/3 (50 overs)	v	Zimbabwe; 227/8 (50 overs)
Amy Hunter 121* (127); Josephine Nkomo 1/45 (10 overs)		Josephine Nkomo 66 (106); Laura Delany 2/32 (10 overs)

Ireland Women won by 85 runs
Harare Sports Club, Harare
Umpires: Iknow Chabi (Zim) and Tafadzwa Musakwa (Zim)
Player of the match: Amy Hunter (Ire)

- Zimbabwe Women won the toss and elected to field.
- Amy Hunter (Ire) became the youngest cricketer, male or female, to score a century in an ODI match, doing so on her 16th birthday.
- Amy Hunter also made the highest individual score for Ireland in WODIs.
