= Eagles women's cricket team =

Zimbabwean women's cricket team

Eagles Women
Personnel
- Captain: Modester Mupachikwa

Team information
- Colours: Orange
- Founded: 2020
- Home ground: Harare Sports Club, Harare

History
- F50 wins: 3
- WT20 wins: 2

The Eagles women's cricket team is a Zimbabwean women's cricket team based in Harare. They compete in the Fifty50 Challenge and the Women's T20 Cup. They won the first two editions of the Women's T20 Cup in 2020–21 and 2021–22, and the last two editions of the Fifty50 Challenge in 2021–22 and 2022–23.

== History ==
The team were formed in 2020, to compete in Zimbabwe's two new women's domestic competitions: the Fifty50 Challenge and the Women's T20 Cup. In the Fifty50 Challenge, the side finished third in the group stage, winning three of their six matches. In the Women's T20 Cup, the side topped the group with four wins from their six matches to qualify for the final. In the final, they restricted Tuskers to 78 from their 20 overs, before chasing the target in 14.1 overs to win the inaugural Women's T20 Cup. Eagles captain Modester Mupachikwa was the leading run-scorer in the competition, whilst Eagles bowler Precious Marange was the leading wicket-taker.

In 2021–22, they won their first one-day title, topping the group stage of the Fifty50 Challenge before beating Rhinos in the final by 167 runs. Eagles bowler Michelle Mavunga was the leading wicket-taker in the competition, with 15 wickets. They then won the T20 Cup the same season, topping the group stage with four wins before beating Mountaineers in the final by 7 wickets. Mavunga was once again the leading wicket-taker in the tournament, whilst Eagles player Kelis Ndlovu was the leading run-scorer. In 2022–23, the side won the Fifty50 Challenge, and finished as runners-up in the T20 Cup.

== Players ==
=== Current squad ===
Based on appearances in the 2022–23 season. Players in bold have international caps.

Name	Nationality	Birth date	Batting style	Bowling style	Notes
Batters
**Beloved Biza**	Zimbabwe	5 January 2009 (age 17)	Right-handed	–	
Betty Magachena	Zimbabwe	Unknown	Unknown	Unknown	
**Adelle Zimunhu**	Zimbabwe	24 August 2004 (age 21)	Right-handed	Unknown	
All-rounders
**Christabel Chatonzwa**	Zimbabwe	23 April 1999 (age 26)	Right-handed	Right-arm off break	
**Precious Marange**	Zimbabwe	26 November 1982 (age 43)	Left-handed	Right-arm fast-medium	
**Kelis Ndlovu**	Zimbabwe	Unknown	Unknown	Unknown	
Wicket-keepers
**Modester Mupachikwa**	Zimbabwe	19 January 1997 (age 29)	Right-handed	–	Captain
Vimbai Mutungwindi	Zimbabwe	11 June 2005 (age 20)	Unknown	–	
Bowlers
**Olinda Chare**	Zimbabwe	24 December 2006 (age 19)	Unknown	Unknown	
Elita Chitumba	Zimbabwe	Unknown	Unknown	Unknown	
Mitchel Chivare	Zimbabwe	Unknown	Unknown	Unknown	
Portia Chiwayi	Zimbabwe	Unknown	Unknown	Unknown	
Cynthia Gambaki	Zimbabwe	Unknown	Unknown	Unknown	
**Tawana Marumani**	Zimbabwe	11 November 2006 (age 19)	Right-handed	Unknown	
**Chipo Moyo**	Zimbabwe	23 December 2005 (age 20)	Right-handed	Unknown	
Ropafadzo Mavunga	Zimbabwe	Unknown	Unknown	Unknown	
Kawthar Padya	Zimbabwe	Unknown	Unknown	Unknown	

== Seasons ==
=== Fifty50 Challenge ===
Season	League standings								Notes
Season	P	W	L	T	A/C	NRR	Pts	Pos	Notes
2020–21	6	3	3	0	0	30	+0.572	3rd	
2021–22	6	5	1	0	0	25	+0.634	1st	Champions
2022–23	6	4	2	0	0	16	+1.105	1st	Champions

=== Women's T20 Cup ===
Season	League standings								Notes
Season	P	W	L	T	A/C	NRR	Pts	Pos	Notes
2020–21	6	4	1	0	1	9	+0.717	1st	Champions
2021–22	6	4	2	0	0	40	+2.330	1st	Champions
2022–23	6	4	2	0	0	16	+0.067	2nd	

== Honours ==
- Fifty50 Challenge:
  - Winners (2): 2021–22 & 2022–23
- Women's T20 Cup:
  - Winners (2): 2020–21 & 2021–22

== See also ==
- Mashonaland Eagles
