= List of Zimbabwe women Twenty20 International cricketers =

This is a list of Zimbabwean women Twenty20 International cricketers. A Twenty20 International (T20I) is an international cricket match between two representative teams, each having T20I status, as determined by the International Cricket Council (ICC). A T20I is played under the rules of Twenty20 cricket.

== Key ==
General

- ‡ – Captain
- † – Wicket-keeper
- First – Year of debut
- Last – Year of latest game
- Mat – Number of matches played

Batting

- Runs – Runs scored in career
- HS – Highest score
- Avg – Runs scored per dismissal
- * – Batsman remained not out

Bowling

- Wkt – Wickets taken in career
- BBI – Best bowling in an innings
- Ave – Average runs per wicket

Fielding

- Ca – Catches taken
- St – Stumpings affected

== List of players ==
Last updated 20 October 2026. This list includes all players who have played at least one T20I match and is initially arranged in the order of debut appearance. Where more than one player won their first cap in the same match, those players are initially listed alphabetically at the time of debut.

Zimbabwe women T20I cricketers
General					Batting				Bowling				Fielding		Ref
No.	Name	First	Last	Mat	Runs	HS	Avg	50	Balls	Wkt	BBI	Ave	Ca	St	Ref
1	Precious Marange	2019	2026	64	231	40	12.15	0	1,265	59	5/7	15.18	12	0	
2	Sharne Mayers	2019	2026	40	889	71*	26.93	5	45	2	1/5	25.50	8	0	
3	Chipo Mugeri-Tiripano‡	2019	2026	79	1,503	80	24.24	2	–	–	–	–	16	0	
4	Modester Mupachikwa†	2019	2026	86	1,763	75*	27.12	4	–	–	–	–	34	13	
5	Anesu Mushangwe	2019	2022	21	99	22	16.50	0	473	33	3/6	7.42	4	0	
6	Mary-Anne Musonda‡	2019	2024	58	1054	60	25.70	5	–	–	–	–	21	0	
7	Nomatter Mutasa	2019	2021	11	5	3*	–	0	192	14	4/9	12.57	2	0	
8	Ashley Ndiraya	2019	2024	29	248	44	14.58	0	44	3	1/0	8.33	8	0	
9	Josephine Nkomo‡	2019	2026	76	702	56*	23.40	1	1,226	68	5/6	14.83	17	0	
10	Loryn Phiri	2019	2026	42	89	31	6.84	0	513	27	5/6	19.44	6	0	
11	Nomvelo Sibanda	2019	2026	71	84	18*	8.40	0	1224	57	5/14	21.33	22	0	
12	Christabel Chatonzwa	2019	2026	16	50	15*	8.33	0	210	9	5/22	25.22	0	0	
13	Chiedza Mzembe	2019	2019	6	–	–	–	–	84	3	2/17	21.66	2	0	
14	Ellen Tshuma	2019	2019	2	–	–	–	–	–	–	–	–	2	0	
15	Tasmeen Granger	2019	2021	14	21	17*	21.00	0	210	21	3/11	4.90	8	0	
16	Chiedza Dhururu†	2019	2026	59	488	67*	13.18	1	–	–	–	–	23	4	
17	Audrey Mazvishaya	2019	2026	29	45	20*	45.00	0	539	26	4/27	20.15	10	0	
18	Loreen Tshuma	2021	2026	55	226	46	9.04	0	928	48	4/11	18.58	17	0	
19	Nyasha Gwanzura	2021	2026	43	260	28	8.12	0	490	26	3/4	22.34	9	0	
20	Esther Mbofana	2021	2022	8	–	–	–	–	150	13	6/11	8.76	3	0	
21	Pellagia Mujaji†	2021	2024	28	154	31	8.10	0	–	–	–	–	5	2	
22	Michelle Mavunga	2022	2026	20	172	41	12.28	0	294	16	3/46	25.12	3	0	
23	Kelis Ndhlovu	2022	2026	79	1,417	70*	21.14	5	887	44	3/12	19.79	9	0	
24	Francisca Chipare	2022	2026	31	23	9	3.28	0	491	14	2/18	43.92	7	0	
25	Lindokuhle Mabhero	2023	2026	34	33	12	11.00	0	628	25	2/15	26.76	7	0	
26	Kudzai Chigora	2024	2026	18	33	14*	8.25	0	338	15	5/7	32.26	4	0	
27	Christine Mutasa	2024	2026	13	102	30*	12.75	0	110	3	1/12	56.66	2	0	
28	Beloved Biza	2024	2026	39	560	49*	16.47	0	480	28	3/9	20.67	9	0	
29	Tawananyasha Marumani	2024	2024	4	25	13*	12.50	0	6	0	–	–	0	0	
30	Passionate Munorwei	2024	2024	3	4	2*	4.00	0	42	2	2/12	24.00	0	0	
31	Chipo Moyo	2024	2024	3	0	0	0.00	0	20	0	–	–	1	0	
32	Runyararo Pasipanodya	2024	2026	8	25	10	3.57	0	–	–	–	–	0	0	
33	Lorraine Pemhiwa	2024	2026	5	11	8	3.66	0	–	–	–	–	1	0	
34	Natasha Mtomba	2025	2026	6	66	24	13.20	0	–	–	–	–	1	0	
35	Adel Zimunu	2025	2026	13	83	20	13.83	0	216	4	2/22	72.75	1	0	
36	Tendai Makusha	2025	2026	13	26	12	8.66	0	202	5	2/30	62.60	5	0	
37	Kelly Ndiraya	2026	2026	1	0	0	0.00	0	–	–	–	–	0	0	
38	Vimbai Mutungwindu†	2026	2026	3	1	1	0.33	0	–	–	–	–	0	1	
39	Olinder Chare†	2026	2026	4	8	8*	–	0	59	2	1/22	36.50	0	0	

== See also ==
- List of Zimbabwe women ODI cricketers
