= Tuskers women's cricket team =

Zimbabwean women's cricket team

Tuskers Women
Personnel
- Captain: Nomvelo Sibanda

Team information
- Colours: Blue
- Founded: 2020
- Home ground: Queens Sports Club, Bulawayo

History
- F50 wins: 0
- WT20 wins: 1 (2024)

The Tuskers women's cricket team is a Zimbabwean women's cricket team based in Bulawayo. They compete in the Fifty50 Challenge and the Women's T20 Cup.

== History ==
The team were formed in 2020, to compete in Zimbabwe's two new women's domestic competitions: the Fifty50 Challenge and the Women's T20 Cup. In the Fifty50 Challenge, the side finished bottom of the group, with one win from their six matches. In the Women's T20 Cup, the side finished second in the group stage, winning three of their six matches, to qualify for the final. In the final, they lost to Eagles by 8 wickets.

In 2021–22, they failed to qualify for the final of either competition, finishing third in the Fifty50 Challenge and fourth in the T20 Cup. In 2022–23, they again finished third in the Fifty50 Challenge and fourth in the T20 Cup.

== Players ==
=== Current squad ===
Based on appearances in the 2022–23 season. Players in bold have international caps.

| Name | Nationality | Birth date | Batting style | Bowling style | Notes |
Batters
| Lindrose Masina | Zimbabwe | Unknown | Unknown | Unknown | |
| **Sharne Mayers** | Zimbabwe | 19 July 1992 (age 33) | Right-handed | Right-arm off break | |
| **Natasha Mthomba** | Zimbabwe | 17 November 2004 (age 21) | Right-handed | – | |
All-rounders
| **Tasmeen Granger** | Zimbabwe | 12 August 1994 (age 31) | Right-handed | Right-arm off break | |
| Thuba Saidi | Zimbabwe | 23 April 2003 (age 22) | Right-handed | Right-arm medium | |
| **Nomvelo Sibanda** | Zimbabwe | 21 November 1996 (age 29) | Left-handed | Left-arm medium | Captain |
| **Loreen Tshuma** | Zimbabwe | 27 November 1996 (age 29) | Right-handed | Right-arm medium | |
Wicket-keepers
| **Chiedza Dhururu** | Zimbabwe | 4 January 1996 (age 30) | Right-handed | – | |
| Sibonginkosi Ncube | Zimbabwe | 16 October 1999 (age 26) | Right-handed | – | |
Bowlers
| Anita Chisirimunhu | Zimbabwe | Unknown | Unknown | Unknown | |
| **Lindakuhle Mabhero** | Zimbabwe | 22 March 2003 (age 22) | Right-handed | Right-arm off break | |
| Buhlebenkosi Maposa | Zimbabwe | Unknown | Left-handed | Right-arm medium | |
| Danielle Meikle | Zimbabwe | 31 August 2007 (age 18) | Right-handed | Right-arm medium | |
| Isabel Mhlanga | Zimbabwe | 21 June 1985 (age 40) | Right-handed | Right-arm medium | |
| Felicity Mpofu | Zimbabwe | Unknown | Unknown | Unknown | |
| **Christine Mutasa** | Zimbabwe | Unknown | Unknown | Unknown | |
| Philontropic Shango | Zimbabwe | 24 March 1996 (age 29) | Left-handed | Right-arm medium | |

== Seasons ==
=== Fifty50 Challenge ===
| Season | League standings | | | | | | | | Notes |
| Season | P | W | L | T | A/C | NRR | Pts | Pos | Notes |
|---|---|---|---|---|---|---|---|---|---|
| 2020–21 | 6 | 1 | 5 | 0 | 0 | 30 | –1.370 | 4th | |
| 2021–22 | 6 | 2 | 4 | 0 | 0 | 10 | –0.006 | 3rd | |
| 2022–23 | 6 | 3 | 3 | 0 | 0 | 12 | +0.165 | 3rd | |

=== Women's T20 Cup ===
| Season | League standings | | | | | | | | Notes |
| Season | P | W | L | T | A/C | NRR | Pts | Pos | Notes |
|---|---|---|---|---|---|---|---|---|---|
| 2020–21 | 6 | 3 | 3 | 0 | 0 | 6 | –0.471 | 2nd | Lost final |
| 2021–22 | 6 | 0 | 5 | 0 | 1 | 5 | –2.187 | 4th | |
| 2022–23 | 6 | 1 | 5 | 0 | 0 | 4 | –1.201 | 4th | |

== Honours ==
- Fifty50 Challenge:
  - Winners (0):
  - Best finish: 2021–22 & 2022–23 (3rd)
- Women's T20 Cup:
  - Winners (0):
  - Best finish: 2020–21 (Runners-up)

== See also ==
- Matabeleland Tuskers
