= Georgina Dempsey =

Irish cricketer (born 2004)

Personal information
- Born: 29 July 2004 (age 22)
- Batting: Right-handed
- Bowling: Right-arm medium
- Role: All-rounder

International information
- National side: Ireland
- ODI debut (cap 88): 5 October 2021 v Zimbabwe
- Last ODI: 15 July 2026 v West Indies
- T20I debut (cap 49): 27 May 2021 v Scotland
- Last T20I: 1 February 2024 v Zimbabwe

Domestic team information
- Years: Team
- 2020–present: Typhoons

Career statistics
Competition	WODI	WT20I
Matches	22	20
Runs scored	126	22
Batting average	14.00	7.33
100s/50s	0/0	0/0
Top score	45*	12*
Balls bowled	901	309
Wickets	16	13
Bowling average	50.12	23.76
5 wickets in innings	0	0
10 wickets in match	0	0
Best bowling	4/54	2/13
Catches/stumpings	5/–	6/–
- Source: Cricinfo, 16 August 2026

Georgina Dempsey (born 29 July 2004) is an Irish cricketer who plays for Typhoons and Ireland. In May 2021, Dempsey was named in Ireland's squad to face Scotland, for a four-match Women's Twenty20 International (WT20I) series in Belfast. She made her WT20I debut on 27 May 2021, for Ireland against Scotland. In August 2021, while playing for Phoenix Cricket Club, she scored 139 not out from 68 deliveries, the highest individual score in Ireland Women's Senior T20 cricket.

In September 2021, Dempsey was named in Ireland's Women's One Day International (WODI) squad for their series against Zimbabwe, the first WODI matches to be played by the Zimbabwe team. She made her WODI debut on 5 October 2021, for Ireland against Zimbabwe. In November 2021, she was named in Ireland's team for the 2021 Women's Cricket World Cup Qualifier tournament in Zimbabwe.
