= Rhinos women's cricket team =

Zimbabwean women's cricket team

Rhinos Women
Personnel
- Captain: Josephine Nkomo

Team information
- Colours: Red
- Founded: 2020
- Home ground: Kwekwe Sports Club, Kwekwe

History
- F50 wins: 0
- WT20 wins: 0

The Rhinos women's cricket team is a Zimbabwean women's cricket team based in Kwekwe. They compete in the Fifty50 Challenge and the Women's T20 Cup.

== History ==
The team were formed in 2020, to compete in Zimbabwe's two new women's domestic competitions: the Fifty50 Challenge and the Women's T20 Cup. In the Fifty50 Challenge, the side finished second in the group with four wins from their six matches to qualify for the final. In the final, they lost to Mountaineers by 62 runs via the Duckworth–Lewis–Stern method. Rhinos batter Josephine Nkomo was the leading-run scorer in the tournament. In the Women's T20 Cup, the side finished bottom of the group stage, winning two of their six matches.

In 2021–22, they again reached the final of the Fifty50 Challenge, finishing second in the group stage, but lost the final to Eagles by 167 runs. Rhinos batter Josephine Nkomo was the leading run-scorer in the competition for the second season running. They finished third in the Women's T20 Cup. In 2022–23, they finished second in the Fifty50 Challenge and third in the Women's T20 Cup.

== Players ==
=== Current squad ===
Based on appearances in the 2022–23 season. Players in bold have international caps.

Name	Nationality	Birth date	Batting style	Bowling style	Notes
Batters
Hillary Marodza	Zimbabwe	16 June 2003 (age 22)	Unknown	Unknown	
**Mary-Anne Musonda**	Zimbabwe	4 August 1991 (age 34)	Right-handed	Right-arm off break	
All-rounders
**Nomatter Mutasa**	Zimbabwe	28 October 1995 (age 30)	Right-handed	Right-arm medium-fast	
**Ashley Ndiraya**	Zimbabwe	6 July 1992 (age 33)	Left-handed	Right-arm leg break	
Dana Ndiraya	Zimbabwe	4 January 1999 (age 27)	Unknown	Unknown	
Kay Ndiraya	Zimbabwe	9 May 2005 (age 20)	Unknown	Unknown	
Kelly Ndiraya	Zimbabwe	9 May 2005 (age 20)	Unknown	Unknown	
**Josephine Nkomo**	Zimbabwe	21 May 1997 (age 28)	Right-handed	Right-arm medium	Captain
Wicket-keepers
Ashley Munatswa	Zimbabwe	23 May 2000 (age 25)	Unknown	–	
Bowlers
Natalie Chikandinga	Zimbabwe	Unknown	Unknown	Unknown	
Violet Dhliwayo	Zimbabwe	3 August 1998 (age 27)	Unknown	Unknown	
Vimbai Kavava	Zimbabwe	19 February 2003 (age 23)	Unknown	Unknown	
Diveniah Ndhlalambi	Zimbabwe	4 May 2006 (age 19)	Unknown	Unknown	
Faith Ndlalambi	Zimbabwe	13 June 2004 (age 21)	Left-handed	Slow left-arm unorthodox	
Faith Shumba	Zimbabwe	Unknown	Unknown	Unknown	

== Seasons ==
=== Fifty50 Challenge ===
Season	League standings								Notes
Season	P	W	L	T	A/C	NRR	Pts	Pos	Notes
2020–21	6	4	2	0	0	40	+0.319	2nd	Lost final
2021–22	6	3	3	0	0	15	–0.041	2nd	Lost final
2022–23	6	4	2	0	0	16	+0.151	2nd	

=== Women's T20 Cup ===
Season	League standings								Notes
Season	P	W	L	T	A/C	NRR	Pts	Pos	Notes
2020–21	6	2	4	0	0	4	–0.101	4th	
2021–22	6	3	2	0	1	35	–0.346	3rd	
2022–23	6	2	4	0	0	8	–0.090	3rd	

== Honours ==
- Fifty50 Challenge:
  - Winners (0):
  - Best finish: 2020–21, 2021–22 & 2022–23 (Runners-up)
- Women's T20 Cup:
  - Winners (0):
  - Best finish: 2021–22 & 2022–23 (3rd)

== See also ==
- Mid West Rhinos
