= Mountaineers women's cricket team =

Zimbabwean women's cricket team

Mountaineers Women
Personnel
- Captain: Pellagia Mujaji

Team information
- Colours: Green
- Founded: 2020
- Home ground: Mutare Sports Club, Mutare

History
- F50 wins: 1
- WT20 wins: 1

The Mountaineers women's cricket team is a Zimbabwean women's cricket team based in Mutare. They compete in the Fifty50 Challenge and the Women's T20 Cup. They won the inaugural edition of the Fifty50 Challenge in 2020–21, and the Women's T20 Cup in 2022–23.

== History ==
The team were formed in 2020, to compete in Zimbabwe's two new women's domestic competitions: the Fifty50 Challenge and the Women's T20 Cup. In the Women's T20 Cup, the side finished third in the group stage, winning two of their six matches. In the Fifty50 Challenge, the side topped the group with four wins from their six matches to qualify for the final. In the final, they restricted Rhinos to 210 all out, before winning by 62 runs via the Duckworth–Lewis–Stern method, with Chipo Mugeri-Tiripano making 85. Mountaineers bowler Francesca Chipare was the leading wicket-taker in the tournament.

In 2021–22, they finished bottom of the group stage of the Fifty50 Challenge, but reached the final of the Women's T20 Cup, before losing to defending champions Eagles. In 2022–23, they finished bottom of the group stage in the Fifty50 Challenge, but won the Women's T20 Cup, winning five of their six matches.

== Players ==
=== Current squad ===
Based on appearances in the 2022–23 season. Players in bold have international caps.

Name	Nationality	Birth date	Batting style	Bowling style	Notes
Batters
Catherine Chitombo	Zimbabwe	6 May 2001 (age 24)	Right-handed	–	
**Chipo Mugeri-Tiripano**	Zimbabwe	2 March 1992 (age 34)	Left-handed	Right-arm medium	
Rutendo Mukwambeni	Zimbabwe	Unknown	Unknown	Unknown	
All-rounders
**Nyasha Gwanzura**	Zimbabwe	14 January 1996 (age 30)	Right-handed	Right-arm medium	
**Audrey Mazvishaya**	Zimbabwe	9 March 1993 (age 32)	Right-handed	Right-arm medium	
**Pellagia Mujaji**	Zimbabwe	9 October 1991 (age 34)	Right-handed	Right-arm medium	Captain
**Passionate Munorwei**	Zimbabwe	Unknown	Unknown	Unknown	
Rumbidzai Nire	Zimbabwe	12 April 1999 (age 26)	Left-handed	Left-arm medium	
**Loryn Phiri**	Zimbabwe	4 November 1998 (age 27)	Right-handed	Right-arm off break	
Wicket-keepers
Precious Dzvifu	Zimbabwe	16 May 1999 (age 26)	Right-handed	–	
Bowlers
Audrey Cherengo	Zimbabwe	9 October 1999 (age 26)	Right-handed	Unknown	
**Kudzai Chigora**	Zimbabwe	6 August 2006 (age 19)	Unknown	Unknown	
**Francesca Chipare**	Zimbabwe	1 October 1998 (age 27)	Unknown	Unknown	
Monique Mushanyi	Zimbabwe	19 February 2006 (age 20)	Right-handed	Unknown	

== Seasons ==
=== Fifty50 Challenge ===
Season	League standings								Notes
Season	P	W	L	T	A/C	NRR	Pts	Pos	Notes
2020–21	6	4	2	0	0	40	+0.332	1st	Champions
2021–22	6	2	4	0	0	10	–0.673	4th	
2022–23	6	1	5	0	0	4	–1.887	4th	

=== Women's T20 Cup ===
Season	League standings								Notes
Season	P	W	L	T	A/C	NRR	Pts	Pos	Notes
2020–21	6	2	3	0	1	5	–0.047	3rd	
2021–22	6	4	2	0	0	40	–0.109	2nd	Lost final
2022–23	6	5	1	0	0	20	+1.319	1st	Champions

== Honours ==
- Fifty50 Challenge:
  - Winners (1): 2020–21
- Women's T20 Cup:
  - Winners (1): 2022–23

== See also ==
- Mountaineers cricket team
