= Sharne Mayers =

Zimbabwean cricketer

Personal information
- Full name: Sharne Mary Mayers
- Born: 19 July 1992 (age 34); Bulawayo, Zimbabwe
- Batting: Right-handed
- Bowling: Right-arm off break
- Role: Batter

International information
- National side: Zimbabwe
- ODI debut (cap 17): 13 November 2021 v Bangladesh
- Last ODI: 27 November 2021 v Pakistan
- T20I debut (cap 2): 5 January 2019 v Namibia
- Last T20I: 25 September 2022 v Thailand

Domestic team information
- Years: Team
- 2019/20–2021/22: Central Gauteng
- 2022/23–present: Tuskers

Career statistics
Competition	WODI	WT20I
Matches	3	22
Runs scored	57	527
Batting average	19.00	31.00
100s/50s	0/0	0/3
Top score	39	68*
Balls bowled	60	12
Wickets	1	1
Bowling average	46.00	16.00
5 wickets in innings	0	0
10 wickets in match	0	0
Best bowling	1/46	1/7
Catches/stumpings	1/–	5/–
- Source: ESPNcricinfo, 30 November 2022

Sharne Mary Mayers (born 19 July 1992) is a Zimbabwean cricketer who plays for the Zimbabwe women's national cricket team.

Mayers was named in Zimbabwe's squad for the 2008 Women's Cricket World Cup Qualifier in South Africa. She captained the Zimbabwe women's national cricket team in the 2017 Women's Cricket World Cup Qualifier in February 2017. She made her Women's Twenty20 International (WT20I) debut for Zimbabwe against Namibia women on 5 January 2019. In July 2019, she was one of four Zimbabwe women cricketers barred by the International Cricket Council (ICC) from playing in a Global Development Squad, due to play against Women's Cricket Super League teams, following the ICC's suspension of Zimbabwe Cricket earlier in the month.

In November 2021, she was named in Zimbabwe's Women's One Day International (WODI) squad for their series against Bangladesh. She made her WODI debut on 13 November 2021, against Bangladesh. Later the same month, she was named in Zimbabwe's team for the 2021 Women's Cricket World Cup Qualifier tournament in Zimbabwe.
