= Tasmeen Granger =

Zimbabwean cricketer (born 1994)

Personal information
- Full name: Tasmeen Granger
- Born: 12 August 1994 (age 32); Bulawayo, Matabeleland
- Batting: Right-handed
- Bowling: Legbreak
- Role: All-rounder

International information
- National side: Zimbabwe
- ODI debut (cap 12): 9 October 2021 v Ireland
- Last ODI: 15 November 2021 v Bangladesh
- T20I debut (cap 15): 6 April 2019 v Kenya
- Last T20I: 19 September 2021 v Namibia

Domestic team information
- Years: Team
- 2020/21–present: Tuskers

Career statistics
Competition	WT20I
Matches	14
Runs scored	21
Batting average	21.00
100s/50s	0/0
Top score	17*
Balls bowled	210
Wickets	21
Bowling average	4.90
5 wickets in innings	0
10 wickets in match	0
Best bowling	3/11
Catches/stumpings	8/–
- Source: Cricinfo, 15 November 2021

Tasmeen Granger (born 12 August 1994) is a Zimbabwean cricketer. She represented Zimbabwe in ICC Women's World Twenty20 Qualifier in 2013 and 2015.

In July 2019, she was one of four Zimbabwe women cricketers barred by the International Cricket Council (ICC) from playing in a Global Development Squad, due to play against teams from the Women's Cricket Super League competition in England and Wales, following the ICC's suspension of Zimbabwe Cricket earlier in the month. In February 2021, she was named in Zimbabwe's squad for their home series against Pakistan.

In October 2021, Granger was named in Zimbabwe's Women's One Day International (WODI) squad for their four-match series against Ireland. The fixtures were the first WODI matches after Zimbabwe gained WODI status from the ICC in April 2021. She made her WODI debut on 9 October 2021, for Zimbabwe against Ireland.
