= Pellagia Mujaji =

Zimbabwean cricketer (born 1991)

Personal information
- Born: 9 October 1991 (age 35); Mutare, Zimbabwe
- Batting: Right-handed
- Bowling: Right-arm medium fast

International information
- National side: Zimbabwe
- ODI debut (cap 4): 5 October 2021 v Ireland
- Last ODI: 7 October 2021 v Ireland
- T20I debut (cap 21): 17 September 2021 v Uganda
- Last T20I: 23 September 2022 v Ireland

Domestic team information
- Years: Team
- 2020/21–present: Mountaineers

Career statistics
Competition	WODI	WT20I
Matches	2	8
Runs scored	22	51
Batting average	11.00	10.20
100s/50s	0/0	0/0
Top score	16	21
Balls bowled	–	–
Wickets	–	–
Bowling average	–	–
5 wickets in innings	–	–
10 wickets in match	–	–
Best bowling	–	–
Catches/stumpings	0/–	3/–
- Source: Cricinfo, 18 September 2022

Pellagia Mujaji (born 9 October 1991) is a Zimbabwean cricketer. She played for the Zimbabwe women's national cricket team in the 2017 Women's Cricket World Cup Qualifier in February 2017. In February 2021, she was named in Zimbabwe's squad for their home series against Pakistan.

In September 2021, she was named in Zimbabwe's Women's Twenty20 International (WT20I) squad for the 2021 ICC Women's T20 World Cup Africa Qualifier tournament in Botswana. She made her WT20I debut on 17 September 2021, for Zimbabwe against Uganda.

In October 2021, Mujaji was named in Zimbabwe's Women's One Day International (WODI) squad for their four-match series against Ireland. The fixtures were the first WODI matches after Zimbabwe gained WODI status from the ICC in April 2021. She made her WODI debut on 5 October 2021, for Zimbabwe against Ireland.
