= Christabel Chatonzwa =

Zimbabwean cricketer (born 1990)

Personal information
- Full name: Christabel Chatonzwa
- Born: 23 April 1990 (age 36)
- Batting: Right-handed
- Bowling: Right-arm offbreak

International information
- National side: Zimbabwe
- ODI debut (cap 15): 10 November 2021 v Bangladesh
- Last ODI: 21 November 2021 v Thailand
- T20I debut (cap 12): 9 January 2019 v Namibia
- Last T20I: 25 September 2022 v Thailand

Domestic team information
- Years: Team
- 2020/21–present: Eagles

Career statistics
Competition	WT20I
Matches	2
Runs scored	–
Batting average	–
100s/50s	–
Top score	–
Balls bowled	36
Wickets	1
Bowling average	30.00
5 wickets in innings	0
10 wickets in match	0
Best bowling	1/19
Catches/stumpings	0/–
- Source: Cricinfo, 2 October 2022

Christabel Chatonzwa (born 23 April 1990) is a Zimbabwean woman cricketer. She made her One Day International debut in the 2008 Women's Cricket World Cup Qualifier and her T20I debut at the 2013 ICC Women's World Twenty20 Qualifier. She made her Women's Twenty20 International (WT20I) debut for Zimbabwe against Namibia women on 9 January 2019. In February 2021, she was named in Zimbabwe's squad for their home series against Pakistan.

In November 2021, she was named in Zimbabwe's Women's One Day International (WODI) squad for their series against Bangladesh. She made her WODI debut on 10 November, against Bangladesh. Later the same month, she was named in Zimbabwe's team for the 2021 Women's Cricket World Cup Qualifier tournament in Zimbabwe.
