= Modester Mupachikwa =

Zimbabwean cricketer (born 1997)

Personal information
- Full name: Modester Mupachikwa
- Born: 19 January 1997 (age 29)
- Batting: Right-handed
- Role: Wicket-keeper

International information
- National side: Zimbabwe
- ODI debut (cap 5): 5 October 2021 v Ireland
- Last ODI: 27 November 2021 v Pakistan
- T20I debut (cap 4): 5 January 2019 v Namibia
- Last T20I: 25 September 2022 v Thailand

Domestic team information
- Years: Team
- 2020/21–present: Eagles

Career statistics
Competition	WODI	WT20I
Matches	8	31
Runs scored	101	696
Batting average	12.62	30.26
100s/50s	0/0	0/3
Top score	33	75*
Catches/stumpings	5/0	12/7
- Source: Cricinfo, 2 October 2022

Modester Mupachikwa (born 19 January 1997) is a Zimbabwean cricketer. She played for the Zimbabwe women's national cricket team in the 2017 Women's Cricket World Cup Qualifier in February 2017. In November 2018, she was named in the Women's Global Development Squad, to play fixtures against Women's Big Bash League (WBBL) clubs. She made her Women's Twenty20 International (WT20I) debut for Zimbabwe against Namibia women on 5 January 2019. In February 2021, she was named in Zimbabwe's squad for their home series against Pakistan.

In October 2021, Mupachikwa was named in Zimbabwe's Women's One Day International (WODI) squad for their four-match series against Ireland. The fixtures were the first WODI matches after Zimbabwe gained WODI status from the ICC in April 2021. She made her WODI debut on 5 October 2021 against Ireland in a match Zimbabwe won by four wickets.

In November 2021, she was named in Zimbabwe's team for the 2021 Women's Cricket World Cup Qualifier tournament in Zimbabwe.
