= Josephine Nkomo =

Zimbabwean cricketer

Personal information
- Full name: Josephine Nakai Nkomo
- Born: 21 May 1997 (age 29); Kwekwe, Zimbabwe
- Batting: Right-handed
- Bowling: Right-arm medium-fast

International information
- National side: Zimbabwe
- ODI debut (cap 8): 5 October 2021 v Ireland
- Last ODI: 27 November 2021 v Pakistan
- T20I debut (cap 9): 5 January 2019 v Namibia
- Last T20I: 25 September 2022 v Thailand

Domestic team information
- Years: Team
- 2020/21–present: Rhinos

Career statistics
Competition	WODI	WT20I
Matches	6	29
Runs scored	164	316
Batting average	32.80	28.72
100s/50s	0/2	0/1
Top score	70*	56*
Balls bowled	258	491
Wickets	5	26
Bowling average	34.20	12.76
5 wickets in innings	0	0
10 wickets in match	0	0
Best bowling	2/46	4/7
Catches/stumpings	1/–	7/–
- Source: Cricinfo, 2 October 2022

Josephine Nkomo (born 21 May 1997) is a Zimbabwean cricketer, and the vice-captain of the Zimbabwe women's national cricket team.

== Career ==
She played for the Zimbabwe women's national cricket team in the 2017 Women's Cricket World Cup Qualifier in February 2017. She made her Women's Twenty20 International (WT20I) debut for Zimbabwe against Namibia women on 5 January 2019. In February 2021, she was named in Zimbabwe's squad for their home series against Pakistan. In May 2021, Nkomo was named as the captain of Zimbabwe's squad for their five-match series against the South Africa Emerging team.

In October 2021, Nkomo was named in Zimbabwe's Women's One Day International (WODI) squad for their four-match series against Ireland. The fixtures were the first WODI matches after Zimbabwe gained WODI status from the ICC in April 2021. She made her WODI debut on 5 October 2021, against Ireland.

In November 2021, she was named in Zimbabwe's team for the 2021 Women's Cricket World Cup Qualifier tournament in Zimbabwe.
