= Chipo Mugeri-Tiripano =

Zimbabwean cricketer

Personal information
- Full name: Chipo Spiwe Mugeri-Tiripano
- Born: 2 March 1992 (age 34); Zimbabwe
- Batting: Left-handed
- Bowling: Right-arm medium
- Role: All-rounder
- Relatives: Donald Tiripano (husband)

International information
- National side: Zimbabwe
- ODI debut (cap 18): 19 April 2023 v Thailand
- Last ODI: 23 April 2023 v Thailand
- T20I debut (cap 3): 5 January 2019 v Namibia
- Last T20I: 25 September 2022 v Thailand

Domestic team information
- Years: Team
- 2020/21–present: Mountaineers

Career statistics
Competition	WT20I
Matches	29
Runs scored	601
Batting average	28.61
100s/50s	0/1
Top score	80
Catches/stumpings	6/–
- Source: ESPNCricinfo, 24 April 2023

Chipo Spiwe Mugeri-Tiripano (born 2 March 1992) is a Zimbabwean cricketer who has captained the Zimbabwean national women's team. She is an all-rounder who bats left-handed and is a right-arm medium-pace bowler.

== Early career ==
Mugeri is from the city of Mutare, in Manicaland Province. She made her international debut for Zimbabwe at the 2008 World Cup Qualifier in South Africa, at the age of 15. She was the second-youngest player in the squad, and one of three 15-year-olds. Mugeri appeared in four of her team's matches at the tournament, scoring 60 runs and taking three wickets. Her best batting and bowling figures came in the same game, when she scored 38 runs and took 1/8 against Bermuda.

Mugeri's next major international tournament was the Africa regional qualifier in December 2010, which formed part of the qualification process for the 2013 World Cup. Zimbabwe finished runner-up at the tournament to qualify for the 2011 World Cup Qualifier, but Mugeri did not make the final team for that event. At the 2013 World Twenty20 Qualifier, Mugeri played in all five of her team's matches, scoring 68 runs (the second-most for her team behind Nonhlanhla Nyathi). Her highest score was 32 runs from 33 balls against Pakistan, in a match where her team's total was just 70 runs.

== International career ==
Mugeri's first international tournament as captain of Zimbabwe was the 2014 Africa Twenty20 Championship in South Africa. She scored 68 runs in one match against Namibia, with her team finishing first to qualify for the 2015 World Twenty20 Qualifier in Thailand. At the World Twenty20 Qualifier, Mugeri scored 120 runs to finish as Zimbabwe's leading run-scorer, and fourth overall. She made 51 not out and took 1/14 against China, and then was named player of the match in the third-place play-off against Scotland, taking 2/17 and scoring 47 not out to help Zimbabwe win from the second-last ball of the match.

In December 2018, she was replaced as the captain of the Zimbabwe women's team by Mary-Anne Musonda. She made her Women's Twenty20 International (WT20I) debut for Zimbabwe against Namibia women on 5 January 2019.

== Personal life ==
Mugeri is married to Donald Tiripano, who has represented the Zimbabwean men's team. They have a daughter Hearly Tiripano.
