= Precious Marange =

Zimbabwean cricketer

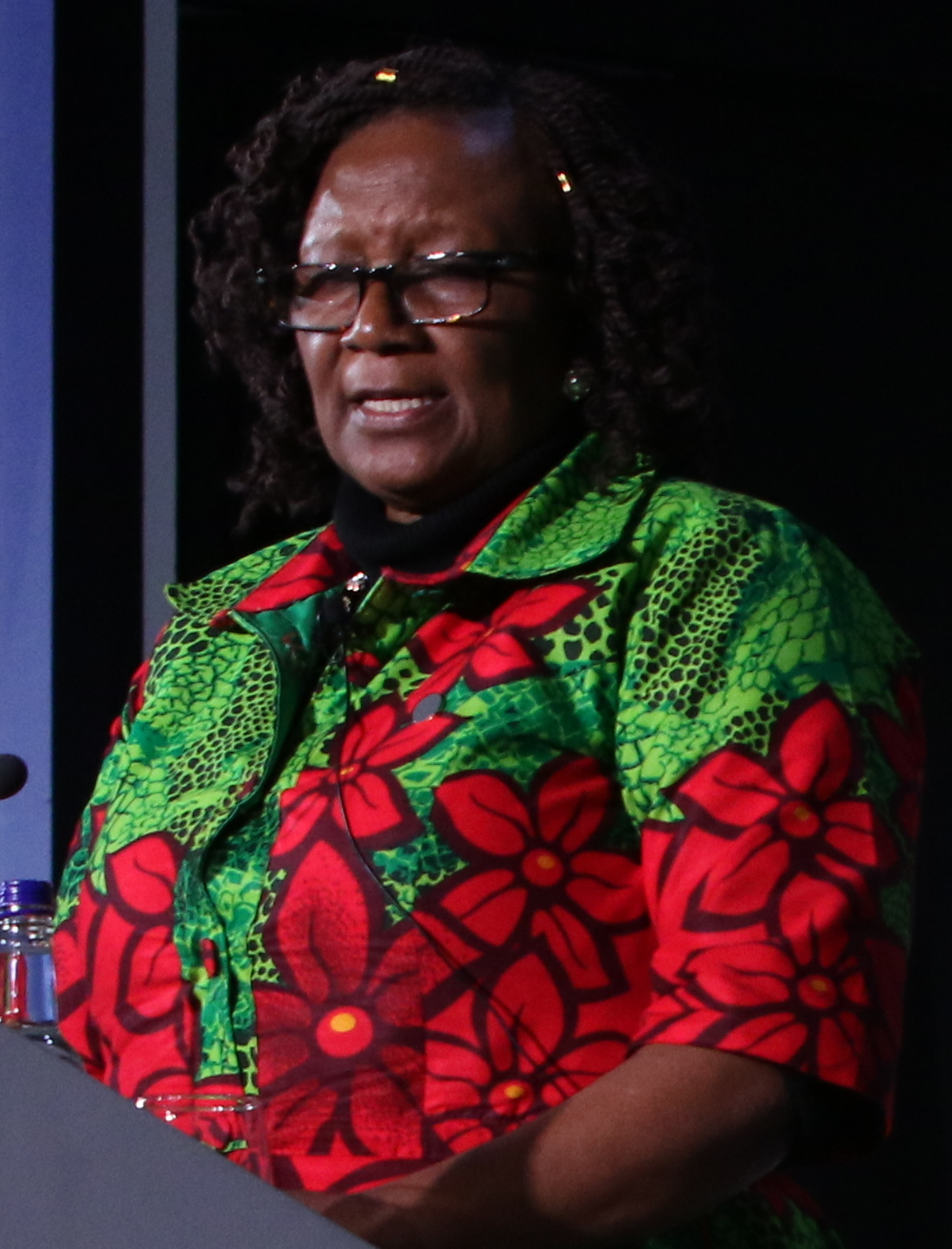

Personal information
- Full name: Precious Marange
- Born: 26 November 1982 (age 43); Zimbabwe
- Batting: Left-handed
- Bowling: Right-arm fast-medium
- Role: Allrounder

International information
- National side: Zimbabwe
- ODI debut (cap 2): 5 October 2021 v Ireland
- Last ODI: 27 November 2021 v Pakistan
- T20I debut (cap 1): 5 January 2019 v Namibia
- Last T20I: 25 September 2022 v Thailand

Domestic team information
- Years: Team
- 2020/21–present: Eagles

Career statistics
Competition	WODI	WT20I
Matches	7	34
Runs scored	82	181
Batting average	11.71	13.92
100s/50s	0/0	0/0
Top score	27	40
Balls bowled	318	684
Wickets	5	26
Bowling average	45.00	15.34
5 wickets in innings	0	0
10 wickets in match	0	0
Best bowling	2/48	4/8
Catches/stumpings	1/–	10/–
- Source: Cricinfo, 2 October 2022

Precious Marange (born 26 November 1982) is a Zimbabwean cricketer. She is a left-handed batter and bowls right-arm fast-medium. She has represented Zimbabwe in ICC Women's World Twenty20 Qualifier and Women's Cricket World Cup Qualifier.

Marange was named in Zimbabwe's squad for the 2008 Women's Cricket World Cup Qualifier in South Africa. She made her Women's Twenty20 International (WT20I) debut for Zimbabwe against Namibia women on 5 January 2019. In February 2021, she was named in Zimbabwe's squad for their home series against Pakistan.

In October 2021, Marange was named in Zimbabwe's Women's One Day International (WODI) squad for their four-match series against Ireland. The fixtures were the first WODI matches after Zimbabwe gained WODI status from the ICC in April 2021. She made her WODI debut on 5 October 2021, against Ireland.

In November 2021, she was named in Zimbabwe's team for the 2021 Women's Cricket World Cup Qualifier tournament in Zimbabwe.
