= Nyasha Gwanzura =

Zimbabwean cricketer (born 1996)

Personal information
- Born: 14 January 1996 (age 30)
- Batting: Right-handed
- Bowling: Right-arm medium

International information
- National side: Zimbabwe
- ODI debut (cap 13): 9 October 2021 v Ireland
- Last ODI: 27 November 2021 v Pakistan
- T20I debut (cap 19): 30 August 2021 v Thailand
- Last T20I: 24 April 2022 v Uganda

Domestic team information
- Years: Team
- 2020/21–present: Mountaineers

Career statistics
Competition	WODI	WT20I
Matches	5	5
Runs scored	88	24
Batting average	22.00	8.00
100s/50s	0/0	0/0
Top score	35*	12
Balls bowled	–	–
Wickets	–	–
Bowling average	–	–
5 wickets in innings	–	–
10 wickets in match	–	–
Best bowling	–	–
Catches/stumpings	0/–	1/–
- Source: Cricinfo, 26 April 2022

Nyasha Gwanzura (born 14 January 1996) is a Zimbabwean cricketer who plays for the Zimbabwe women's national cricket team.

In August 2021, Gwanzura was named in Zimbabwe's Women's Twenty20 International (WT20I) squad for their three-match series against Thailand. She made her WT20I debut on 30 August 2021, against Thailand. In October 2021, Gwanzura was named in Zimbabwe's Women's One Day International (WODI) squad for their four-match series against Ireland. The fixtures were the first WODI matches after Zimbabwe also gained WODI status from the International Cricket Council (ICC) in April 2021. She made her WODI debut on 9 October 2021, against Ireland.

In November 2021, she was named in Zimbabwe's team for the 2021 Women's Cricket World Cup Qualifier tournament in Zimbabwe.
