= Loreen Tshuma =

Zimbabwean cricketer

Personal information
- Born: 27 November 1996 (age 29)
- Batting: Right-handed
- Bowling: Right-arm medium

International information
- National side: Zimbabwe
- ODI debut (cap 11): 5 October 2021 v Ireland
- Last ODI: 27 November 2021 v Pakistan
- T20I debut (cap 18): 28 August 2021 v Thailand
- Last T20I: 25 September 2022 v Thailand

Domestic team information
- Years: Team
- 2021/22–present: Tuskers

Career statistics
Competition	WODI	WT20I
Matches	6	10
Runs scored	22	33
Batting average	4.40	16.50
100s/50s	0/0	0/0
Top score	7	22*
Balls bowled	216	174
Wickets	3	14
Bowling average	50.00	10.50
5 wickets in innings	0	0
10 wickets in match	0	0
Best bowling	1/22	4/11
Catches/stumpings	0/–	2/–
- Source: Cricinfo, 2 October 2022

Loreen Tshuma (born 27 November 1996) is a Zimbabwean cricketer. She played for the Zimbabwe women's national cricket team in the 2017 Women's Cricket World Cup Qualifier in February 2017.

In August 2021, she was named in Zimbabwe's squad for their home series against Thailand. She made her Women's Twenty20 International (WT20I) debut on 28 August 2021, for Zimbabwe against Thailand women.

In October 2021, Tshuma was named in Zimbabwe's Women's One Day International (WODI) squad for their four-match series against Ireland. The fixtures were the first WODI matches after Zimbabwe gained WODI status from the ICC in April 2021. She made her WODI debut on 5 October 2021, for Zimbabwe against Ireland.

In November 2021, she was named in Zimbabwe's team for the 2021 Women's Cricket World Cup Qualifier tournament in Zimbabwe.
