= Francisca Chipare =

Zimbabwean cricketer

Personal information
- Born: 1 October 1998 (age 28)
- Batting: Right-handed
- Bowling: Right-arm medium

International information
- National side: Zimbabwe
- ODI debut (cap 16): 10 November 2021 v Bangladesh
- Last ODI: 2 October 2025 v United Arab Emirates
- T20I debut (cap 24): 21 April 2022 v Uganda
- Last T20I: 6 October 2025 v United Arab Emirates

Domestic team information
- Years: Team
- 2020/21–present: Mountaineers

Career statistics
Competition	WODI	WT20I
Matches	9	26
Runs scored	35	21
Batting average	5.83	4.20
100s/50s	0/0	0/0
Top score	13	9
Balls bowled	278	425
Wickets	5	13
Bowling average	41.80	40.23
5 wickets in innings	0	0
10 wickets in match	0	0
Best bowling	3/15	2/18
Catches/stumpings	0/–	7/–
- Source: Cricinfo, 15 October 2025

Francisca Chipare (born 1 October 1998) is a Zimbabwean cricketer who plays for the Zimbabwe women's national cricket team. In February 2021, Chipare was named in Zimbabwe's Women's Twenty20 International (WT20I) squad for their series against Pakistan. However, due to the COVID-19 pandemic, the tour was called off after just one match, with Chipare missing out on her chance to debut.

== Career ==
In October 2021, she was named in Zimbabwe's Women's One Day International (WODI) squad for their series against Ireland. The following month, she was again named in Zimbabwe's WODI squad, this time for their series against Bangladesh. She made her WODI debut on 10 November 2021, for Zimbabwe against Bangladesh. Later the same month, she was named in Zimbabwe's team for the 2021 Women's Cricket World Cup Qualifier tournament in Zimbabwe.

In April 2022, she was named in Zimbabwe's WT20I squad for the 2022 Capricorn Women's Tri-Series. She made her WT20I debut on 21 April 2022, against Uganda.

She started playing cricket at the age of eleven. She was coached by Nonhlahla Nyathi. She is currently pursuing Bachelor of Science in wildlife, ecology and conservation.

== Personal life ==
On 11 October 2025, she married Silas Rimawo.
