= Ashley Ndiraya =

Zimbabwean cricketer (born 1992)

Personal information
- Full name: Ashley Rutendo Ndiraya
- Born: 6 July 1992 (age 34)
- Batting: Left-handed
- Bowling: Legbreak

International information
- National side: Zimbabwe
- ODI debut (cap 7): 5 October 2021 v Ireland
- Last ODI: 27 November 2021 v Pakistan
- T20I debut (cap 8): 5 January 2019 v Namibia
- Last T20I: 17 September 2021 v Uganda

Domestic team information
- Years: Team
- 2020/21–present: Rhinos

Career statistics
Competition	WODI	WT20I
Matches	8	18
Runs scored	124	168
Batting average	15.50	16.80
100s/50s	0/0	0/0
Top score	38	44
Catches/stumpings	1/–	6/–
- Source: Cricinfo, 13 September 2022

Ashley Ndiraya (born 6 July 1992) is a Zimbabwean cricketer. She played for the Zimbabwe women's national cricket team in the 2017 Women's Cricket World Cup Qualifier in February 2017. She made her Women's Twenty20 International (WT20I) debut for Zimbabwe against Namibia women on 5 January 2019. In February 2021, she was named in Zimbabwe's squad for their home series against Pakistan.

In October 2021, Ndiraya was named in Zimbabwe's Women's One Day International (WODI) squad for their four-match series against Ireland. The fixtures were the first WODI matches after Zimbabwe gained WODI status from the ICC in April 2021. She made her WODI debut on 5 October 2021, against Ireland.
