= Chiedza Dhururu =

Zimbabwean cricketer (born 1996)

Personal information
- Full name: Chiedza Teresia Dhururu
- Born: 4 January 1996 (age 30)
- Batting: Right-handed
- Role: Wicket-keeper

International information
- National side: Zimbabwe
- ODI debut (cap 1): 5 October 2021 v Ireland
- Last ODI: 10 November 2021 v Bangladesh
- T20I debut (cap 16): 5 May 2019 v Mozambique
- Last T20I: 24 April 2022 v Namibia

Domestic team information
- Years: Team
- 2020/21–present: Tuskers

Career statistics
Competition	WODI	WT20I
Matches	5	15
Runs scored	45	142
Batting average	9.00	17.75
100s/50s	0/0	0/0
Top score	16	44
Catches/stumpings	0/0	7/1
- Source: Cricinfo, 26 April 2022

Chiedza Dhururu (born 4 January 1996) is a Zimbabwean cricketer who plays for the Zimbabwe women's national cricket team.

In January 2019, Dhururu was named in Zimbabwe's Women's Twenty20 International (WT20I) squad for their five-match series against Namibia. The matches were the first WT20I matches to be played by Zimbabwe since the International Cricket Council (ICC) awarded WT20I status to all of its members in July 2018. Dhururu did not play in the series against Namibia, but she was selected for the 2019 ICC Women's Qualifier Africa tournament in May 2019. She made her WT20I debut on 5 May 2019, for Zimbabwe against Mozambique. In October 2021, Dhururu was named in Zimbabwe's Women's One Day International (WODI) squad for their four-match series against Ireland. The fixtures were also the first WODI matches after Zimbabwe gained WODI status from the ICC in April 2021. She made her WODI debut on 5 October 2021, against Ireland.

In November 2021, she was named in Zimbabwe's team for the 2021 Women's Cricket World Cup Qualifier tournament in Zimbabwe.
