= Audrey Mazvishaya =

Zimbabwean cricketer (born 1993)

Personal information
- Born: 9 March 1993 (age 33)
- Batting: Right-handed
- Bowling: Right-arm medium

International information
- National side: Zimbabwe
- ODI debut (cap 14): 9 October 2021 v Ireland
- Last ODI: 27 November 2021 v Pakistan
- T20I debut (cap 17): 5 May 2019 v Mozambique
- Last T20I: 25 September 2022 v Thailand

Domestic team information
- Years: Team
- 2020/21–present: Mountaineers

Career statistics
Competition	WODI	WT20I
Matches	5	12
Runs scored	15	1
Batting average	3.75	–
100s/50s	0/0	0/0
Top score	8*	1*
Balls bowled	126	210
Wickets	1	8
Bowling average	126.00	24.12
5 wickets in innings	0	0
10 wickets in match	0	0
Best bowling	1/15	2/5
Catches/stumpings	1/–	1/–
- Source: Cricinfo, 2 October 2022

Audrey Mazvishaya (born 9 March 1993) is a Zimbabwean cricketer who plays for the Zimbabwe women's national cricket team.

In May 2019, Mazvishaya was named in Zimbabwe's Women's Twenty20 International (WT20I) squad for 2019 ICC Women's Qualifier Africa tournament. She made her WT20I debut on 5 May 2019, for Zimbabwe against Mozambique. In October 2021, Mazvishaya was named in Zimbabwe's Women's One Day International (WODI) squad for their four-match series against Ireland. The fixtures were the first WODI matches after Zimbabwe also gained WODI status from the ICC in April 2021. She made her WODI debut on 9 October 2021, for Zimbabwe against Ireland.

In November 2021, she was named in Zimbabwe's team for the 2021 Women's Cricket World Cup Qualifier tournament in Zimbabwe.
