= Loryn Phiri =

Zimbabwean cricketer

Personal information
- Full name: Loryn Ntandoyenkosi Munashe Phiri
- Born: 4 November 1998 (age 28)
- Batting: Right-handed
- Bowling: Right-arm off break

International information
- National side: Zimbabwe
- ODI debut (cap 9): 5 October 2021 v Ireland
- Last ODI: 15 November 2021 v Bangladesh
- T20I debut (cap 10): 5 January 2019 v Namibia
- Last T20I: 13 September 2022 v Thailand

Domestic team information
- Years: Team
- 2020/21–present: Mountaineers

Career statistics
| Competition | WODI | WT20I |
|---|---|---|
| Matches | 4 | 25 |
| Runs scored | 17 | 3 |
| Batting average | 8.50 | 1.00 |
| 100s/50s | 0/0 | 0/0 |
| Top score | 10* | 2 |
| Balls bowled | 132 | 333 |
| Wickets | 2 | 25 |
| Bowling average | 55.00 | 10.56 |
| 5 wickets in innings | 0 | 1 |
| 10 wickets in match | 0 | 0 |
| Best bowling | 1/14 | 5/6 |
| Catches/stumpings | 2/– | 5/– |
- Source: Cricinfo, 14 September 2022

Loryn Phiri (born 4 November 1998) is a Zimbabwean cricketer who plays for the Zimbabwe women's national cricket team.

In January 2019, Phiri was named in Zimbabwe's Women's Twenty20 International (WT20I) squad for their five-match series against Namibia. The matches were the first WT20I matches to be played by Zimbabwe since the International Cricket Council (ICC) awarded WT20I status to all of its members in July 2018. She made her WT20I debut on 5 January 2019, for Zimbabwe against Namibia. In October 2021, Phiri was named in Zimbabwe's Women's One Day International (WODI) squad for their four-match series against Ireland. The fixtures were the first WODI matches after Zimbabwe also gained WODI status from the ICC in April 2021. She made her WODI debut on 5 October 2021, for Zimbabwe against Ireland.

In November 2021, she was named in Zimbabwe's team for the 2021 Women's Cricket World Cup Qualifier tournament in Zimbabwe.
