= Nomvelo Sibanda =

Zimbabwean cricketer

Personal information
- Born: 21 November 1996 (age 29); Bulilimamangwe District, Zimbabwe
- Batting: Left-handed
- Bowling: Left-arm medium
- Role: Bowler

International information
- National side: Zimbabwe
- ODI debut (cap 10): 5 October 2021 v Ireland
- Last ODI: 15 November 2021 v Bangladesh
- T20I debut (cap 11): 5 January 2019 v Namibia
- Last T20I: 25 September 2022 v Thailand

Domestic team information
- Years: Team
- 2018/19: Kei
- 2020/21–present: Tuskers

Career statistics
| Competition | WODI | WT20I |
|---|---|---|
| Matches | 3 | 24 |
| Runs scored | 27 | 12 |
| Batting average | 27.00 | 12.00 |
| 100s/50s | 0/0 | 0/0 |
| Top score | 27 | 11* |
| Balls bowled | 132 | 462 |
| Wickets | 3 | 32 |
| Bowling average | 45.33 | 11.93 |
| 5 wickets in innings | 0 | 1 |
| 10 wickets in match | 0 | 0 |
| Best bowling | 1/25 | 5/14 |
| Catches/stumpings | 1/– | 7/– |
- Source: Cricinfo, 2 October 2022

Nomvelo Sibanda (born 21 November 1996) is a Zimbabwean cricketer who plays for the Zimbabwe women's national cricket team as a left-arm medium bowler. She has previously played for Kei.

In January 2019, Sibanda was named in Zimbabwe's Women's Twenty20 International (WT20I) squad for their five-match series against Namibia. The matches were the first WT20I matches to be played by Zimbabwe since the International Cricket Council (ICC) awarded WT20I status to all of its members in July 2018. She made her WT20I debut on 5 January 2019, for Zimbabwe against Namibia, claiming one wicket for 20 runs in her four overs. In October 2021, Sibanda was named in Zimbabwe's Women's One Day International (WODI) squad for their four-match series against Ireland. The fixtures were the first WODI matches after Zimbabwe also gained WODI status from the ICC in April 2021. She made her WODI debut on 5 October 2021, against Ireland, where she took one wicket for 49 runs.

In November 2021, she was named in Zimbabwe's team for the 2021 Women's Cricket World Cup Qualifier tournament in Zimbabwe. In April 2022, she was named in Zimbabwe's squad for the 2022 Capricorn Women's Tri-Series. In the final of the tournament, against Namibia, she became the first bowler for Zimbabwe to take a hat-trick in a WT20I match, and she also took her first five-wicket haul in WT20Is.
