= Zimbabwean women's cricket team in Namibia in 2020–21 =

International cricket tour

	Namibia women	Zimbabwe women
- Dates: 24 January – 2 February 2021
Captains	Irene van Zyl	

Twenty20 International series

The Zimbabwe women's cricket team were scheduled to tour Namibia between 24 January and 2 February 2021 to play a five-match Women's Twenty20 International (WT20I) series and two 50-over games. The venue for all of the matches was to be the United Ground in Windhoek.

As a result of the COVID-19 pandemic, the Namibian women's team had not played an international fixture since the Women's World Twenty20 Qualifier in September 2019 – a tournament that they had participated in following the International Cricket Council's suspension of Zimbabwe. Zimbabwe's most recent matches were at the African qualifier event in May 2019.

On 7 January 2021, Cricket Namibia announced that the series had been postponed due to COVID-19 lockdown regulations in the country.

== Squads ==
Namibia	Zimbabwe
Irene van Zyl (c); Jurriene Diergaardt; Dietlind Foerster; Phia Gerber; Kayleen Green; Victoria Hamunyela; Reehana Khan; Yasmeen Khan (wk); Mekelanye Mwatile; Wilka Mwatile; Sylvia Shihepo; Namusha Shiomwenyo; Adri van der Merwe; Sune Wittmann	

== WT20I series ==
=== 1st WT20I ===
24 January 2021
10:00

Namibia	v	Zimbabwe

United Ground, Windhoek

=== 2nd WT20I ===
25 January 2021
14:00

Namibia	v	Zimbabwe

United Ground, Windhoek

=== 3rd WT20I ===
27 January 2021
10:00

Namibia	v	Zimbabwe

United Ground, Windhoek

=== 4th WT20I ===
28 January 2021
14:00

Namibia	v	Zimbabwe

United Ground, Windhoek

=== 5th WT20I ===
30 January 2021
10:00

Namibia	v	Zimbabwe

United Ground, Windhoek

== 50-Over series ==
=== 1st 50-Over match ===
31 January 2021
10:00

Namibia	v	Zimbabwe

United Ground, Windhoek

=== 2nd 50-Over match ===
2 February 2021
10:00

Namibia	v	Zimbabwe

United Ground, Windhoek
