= Namibia women's cricket team in the Netherlands and Germany in 2022 =

International cricket tour

The Namibia women's cricket team toured the Netherlands and Germany in June and July 2022 to play a five-match bilateral Women's Twenty20 International (WT20I) series against the Netherlands and a three-match WT20I series against Germany. The first three matches in the Netherlands were originally scheduled to be played at Sportpark Harga in Schiedam, and the last two games of the series were scheduled to be played at Sportpark Westvliet in Voorburg. All three matches of the Germany series were played at the Bayer Uerdingen Cricket Ground, in Krefeld. The Netherlands won their series against Namibia 3–2, after several closely contested matches.

== Squads ==
Netherlands	Germany	Namibia
Heather Siegers (c); Babette de Leede (wk); Marloes Braat; Caroline de Lange; Sterre Kalis; Hannah Landheer; Eva Lynch; Frederique Overdijk; Juliët Post; Robine Rijke; Silver Siegers; Annemijn Thomson; Annemijn van Beuge; Isabel van der Woning; Jolien van Vliet (wk); Iris Zwilling; Mikkie Zwilling	Anuradha Doddaballapur (c); Milena Beresford; Stephanie Frohnmayer; Christina Gough; Shravya Kolcharam; Sharmaine Mannan; Suzanne McAnanama-Brereton; Antonia Meyenborg; Sabeena Noor; Janet Ronalds; Sharanya Sadarangani; Karthika Vijayaraghavan (wk); Peris Wadenpohl	Irene van Zyl (c); Jurriene Diergaardt; Dietlind Foerster; Merczerly Gorases; Kayleen Green; Victoria Hamunyela; Yasmeen Khan (wk); Mekelaye Mwatile; Wilka Mwatile; Sylvia Shihepo; Adri van der Merwe; Edelle van Zyl; Sune Wittmann

== Netherlands v Namibia WT20I series ==
Namibia women's cricket team in the Netherlands in 2022
	Netherlands	Namibia
- Dates: 27 June – 1 July 2022
Captains	Heather Siegers (Note: Babette de Leede captained Netherlands for the 6th match.)	Irene van Zyl

Twenty20 International series
- Results: Netherlands won the 6-match series 3–2
Most runs	Sterre Kalis (114)	Yasmeen Khan (108)
Most wickets	Iris Zwilling (10)	Sune Wittmann (8)

After the first scheduled match of the series in Schiedam was abandoned due to a wet outfield, Namibia won a low-scoring opening contest with one ball remaining in their innings. However, later the same day, Netherlands won the next game by 70 runs after captain Heather Siegers was dropped five times in her innings of 41 and the Namibians were then bowled out for only 29 runs. the series moved on to Voorburg, where the sides again traded wins with Namibia again chased down their target in the final over, before hosts completed a 5-run victory in a rain-affected match later in the afternoon. The series decider was another close encounter, with the visitors looking set complete another tense run-chase, but a wicket maiden by Frederique Overdijk in the final over sealed a 2-run success and a 3–2 series win for the Netherlands.

=== 1st WT20I ===
27 June 2022
16:00
Scorecard

Netherlands	v	Namibia

Match abandoned
Sportpark Harga, Schiedam
Umpires: Nitin Bathi (Ned) and Martin Hancock (Ned)

- No toss.
- No play was possible due to a wet outfield.
- The match was rescheduled to be played on 30 June 2022.

=== 2nd WT20I ===
28 June 2022
11:00
Scorecard

Netherlands; 80 (15 overs)	v	Namibia; 81/7 (19.5 overs)
Sterre Kalis 35 (28); Sune Wittmann 4/20 (4 overs)		Jurriene Diergaardt 23 (38); Iris Zwilling 3/20 (4 overs)

Namibia won by 3 wickets
Sportpark Harga, Schiedam
Umpires: Martin Hancock (Ned) and Maulik Prabhudesai (Ned)

- Namibia won the toss and elected to field.

=== 3rd WT20I ===
28 June 2022
16:00
Scorecard

Netherlands; 99/7 (20 overs)	v	Namibia; 29 (11 overs)
Heather Siegers 41 (40); Sune Wittmann 3/19 (4 overs)		Adri van der Merwe 14 (19); Caroline de Lange 4/6 (3 overs)

Netherlands won by 70 runs
Sportpark Harga, Schiedam
Umpires: Nitin Bathi (Ned) and Martin Hancock (Ned)

- Netherlands won the toss and elected to bat.

=== 4th WT20I ===
30 June 2022
11:00
Scorecard

Netherlands; 83/9 (20 overs)	v	Namibia; 84/7 (19.3 overs)
Heather Siegers 39 (42); Wilka Mwatile 4/18 (4 overs)		Kayleen Green 25 (24); Eva Lynch 2/8 (3 overs)

Namibia won by 3 wickets
Sportpark Westvliet, Voorburg
Umpires: Nitin Bathi (Ned) and Maulik Prabhudesai (Ned)

- Namibia won the toss and elected to field.
- This match was added to the schedule after the first game was abandoned.

=== 5th WT20I ===
30 June 2022
15:00
Scorecard

Namibia; 130/8 (20 overs)	v	Netherlands; 71/2 (11 overs)
Yasmeen Khan 69 (44); Iris Zwilling 3/22 (4 overs)		Babette de Leede 33* (38); Wilka Mwatile 1/10 (2 overs)

Netherlands won by 5 runs (DLS method)
Sportpark Westvliet, Voorburg
Umpires: Nitin Bathi (Ned) and Martin Hancock (Ned)

- Netherlands won the toss and elected to field.
- No further play was possible due to rain.

=== 6th WT20I ===
1 July 2022
10:00
Scorecard

Netherlands; 97/7 (20 overs)	v	Namibia; 95/7 (20 overs)
Sterre Kalis 39 (46); Dietlind Foerster 2/14 (2 overs)		Merczerly Gorases 25 (28); Frederique Overdijk 3/17 (4 overs)

Netherlands won by 2 runs
Sportpark Westvliet, Voorburg
Umpires: Martin Hancock (Ned) and Maulik Prabhudesai (Ned)
Player of the match: Frederique Overdijk (Ned)

- Namibia won the toss and elected to field.

== Germany v Namibia WT20I series ==
Namibia women's cricket team in Germany in 2022
	Germany	Namibia
- Dates: 2 – 3 July 2022
Captains	Anuradha Doddaballapur	Irene van Zyl

Twenty20 International series
- Results: Namibia won the 3-match series 3–0
Most runs	Christina Gough (57)	Sune Wittmann (188)
Most wickets	Milena Beresford (4)	Yasmeen Khan (5)
- Player of the series: Sune Wittmann (Nam)

=== 1st WT20I ===
2 July 2022
16:00
Scorecard

Germany; 61/8 (20 overs)	v	Namibia; 64/0 (5.1 overs)
Janet Ronalds 14 (24); Victoria Hamunyela 3/11 (4 overs)		Sune Wittmann 41* (16)

Namibia won by 10 wickets
Bayer Uerdingen Cricket Ground, Krefeld
Umpires: Nikhil Dhanawade (Ger) and Jason Flannery (Ger)
Player of the match: Sune Wittmann (Nam)

- Namibia won the toss and elected to field.

=== 2nd WT20I ===
3 July 2022
9:30
Scorecard

Namibia; 221/3 (20 overs)	v	Germany; 71/7 (20 overs)
Sune Wittmann 80 (33); Shravya Kolcharam 1/31 (3 overs)		Christina Gough 15 (18); Irene van Zyl 2/20 (4 overs)

Namibia won by 150 runs
Bayer Uerdingen Cricket Ground, Krefeld
Umpires: Nikhil Dhanawade (Ger) and Arun Kumar (Ger)
Player of the match: Sune Wittmann (Nam)

- Germany won the toss and elected to field.

=== 3rd WT20I ===
3 July 2022
13:30
Scorecard

Namibia; 186/7 (20 overs)	v	Germany; 104/8 (20 overs)
Sune Wittmann 67 (38); Milena Beresford 4/22 (4 overs)		Janet Ronalds 37 (46); Yasmeen Khan 4/20 (4 overs)

Namibia won by 82 runs
Bayer Uerdingen Cricket Ground, Krefeld
Umpires: Jason Flannery (Ger) and Arun Kumar (Ger)
Player of the match: Yasmeen Khan (Nam)

- Namibia won the toss and elected to bat.
- Sabeena Noor (Ger) made her WT20I debut.
