= 2022 Capricorn Women's Tri-Series =

International cricket tournament

- Date: 20–26 April 2022
- Location: Namibia
- Result: Zimbabwe won the tournament
Teams
Namibia	Uganda	Zimbabwe
Captains
Irene van Zyl	Concy Aweko	Mary-Anne Musonda (Note: Josephine Nkomo captained Zimbabwe Women in the seventh WT20I of the series.)
Most runs
Jurriene Diergaardt (141)	Janet Mbabazi (118)	Chipo Mugeri-Tiripano (172)
Most wickets
Sune Wittmann (9)	Janet Mbabazi (11)	Anesu Mushangwe (10)

The 2022 Capricorn Women's Tri-Series was a Women's Twenty20 International (WT20I) cricket tournament that was held in Namibia in April 2022. The participating teams were the hosts Namibia, along with Uganda and Zimbabwe. The tournament consisted of a triple round-robin stage followed by a final between the top two teams. The series was the first as head coach of Zimbabwe Women for former international cricketer Gary Brent.

Namibia won the opening match of the series, against Zimbabwe, by seven wickets, to record their first ever win against a Full Member side. On day two of the series, Uganda lost both of their matches, the first by twelve runs to Namibia, and then by eight runs to Zimbabwe. Zimbabwe defeated Uganda again on day three, this time by 22 runs, despite a controversial dismissal of Zimbabwean captain Mary-Ann Musonda for obstructing the field. On the fourth day, Zimbabwe bowled out the hosts for only 41 runs before securing a win by nine wickets. Namibia were bowled out cheaply again in the afternoon, this time for 68, but were still able to defeat Uganda by 28 runs thanks to a first five-wicket haul for Sune Wittmann. Zimbabwe rotated their squad for their final round-robin game, in which Josephine Nkomo took the captaincy in a win by 11 runs over Uganda. Later on day five, Zimbabwe recorded their highest WT20I partnership, with openers Sharne Mayers and Kelis Ndhlovu adding an unbeaten 156 runs in a 67-run win over Namibia.

Following the conclusion of the round-robin matches, Zimbabwe and Namibia had advanced to the final of the series. Zimbabwe won the final by seven wickets, with Nomvelo Sibanda taking a hat-trick and a five-wicket haul.

== Squads ==
Namibia	Uganda	Zimbabwe
Irene van Zyl (c); Jurriene Diergaardt; Dietlind Foerster; Kayleen Green; Merczerly Gorases; Victoria Hamunyela; Yasmeen Khan (wk); Mekelaye Mwatile; Wilka Mwatile; Sylvia Shihepo; Namusha Shiomwenyo; Adri van der Merwe; Edelle van Zyl; Sune Wittmann	Concy Aweko (c); Janet Mbabazi (vc); Sarah Akiteng; Evelyn Anyipo; Kevin Awino (wk); Leona Babirye; Naome Bagenda; Mohammed Jimia; Susan Kakai; Phiona Kulume; Patricia Malemikia; Rita Musamali; Rita Nyangendo; Shakirah Sadick	Mary-Anne Musonda (c); Josephine Nkomo (vc); Francisca Chipare; Chiedza Dhururu (wk); Nyasha Gwanzura; Sharne Mayers; Precious Marange; Michelle Mavunga; Chipo Mugeri-Tiripano; Pellagia Mujaji; Modester Mupachikwa (wk); Anesu Mushangwe; Kelis Ndhlovu; Loryn Phiri; Nomvelo Sibanda

== Round-robin ==
=== Points table ===
Pos	Team	Pld	W	L	NR	Pts	NRR
1	Zimbabwe	6	5	1	0	10	1.593
2	Namibia	6	4	2	0	8	−0.754
3	Uganda	6	0	6	0	0	−0.732

Source: ESPNcricinfo

Qualified for the final

=== Fixtures ===
20 April 2022
14:30
Scorecard

Zimbabwe; 130/3 (20 overs)	v	Namibia; 131/3 (19.4 overs)
Chipo Mugeri-Tiripano 80 (59); Sune Wittmann 1/19 (3 overs)		Jurriene Diergaardt 62* (60); Michelle Mavunga 2/10 (4 overs)

Namibia won by 7 wickets
Trans Namib Ground, Windhoek
Umpires: Lauritz Haccou (Nam) and Esau Heynes (Nam)
Player of the match: Jurriene Diergaardt (Nam)

- Zimbabwe won the toss and elected to bat.
- Michelle Mavunga and Kelis Ndhlovu (Zim) both made their WT20I debuts.

21 April 2022
09:30
Scorecard

Namibia; 90/9 (20 overs)	v	Uganda; 78/8 (20 overs)
Jurriene Diergaardt 36 (34); Evelyn Anyipo 3/18 (4 overs)		Kevin Awino 23 (43); Sune Wittmann 2/19 (4 overs)

Namibia won by 12 runs
Trans Namib Ground, Windhoek
Umpires: Henriette Hugo (Nam) and Jeff Luck (Nam)
Player of the match: Jurriene Diergaardt (Nam)

- Uganda won the toss and elected to field.
- Sarah Akiteng, Leona Babirye, Phiona Kulume and Rita Nyangendo (Uga) all made their WT20I debuts.

21 April 2022
14:30
Scorecard

Zimbabwe; 100 (19.5 overs)	v	Uganda; 92/8 (20 overs)
Chipo Mugeri-Tiripano 46 (46); Janet Mbabazi 4/19 (4 overs)		Janet Mbabazi 21 (32); Anesu Mushangwe 2/25 (4 overs)

Zimbabwe won by 8 runs
Trans Namib Ground, Windhoek
Umpires: Lauritz Haccou (Nam) and Andre Maasz (Nam)
Player of the match: Chipo Mugeri-Tiripano (Zim)

- Zimbabwe won the toss and elected to bat.
- Francisca Chipare (Zim) made her WT20I debut.

22 April 2022
14:30
Scorecard

Zimbabwe; 127/5 (20 overs)	v	Uganda; 105/6 (20 overs)
Josephine Nkomo 43* (38); Patricia Malemikia 2/15 (4 overs)		Janet Mbabazi 42* (36); Josephine Nkomo 2/16 (4 overs)

Zimbabwe won by 22 runs
Trans Namib Ground, Windhoek
Umpires: Esau Heynes (Nam) and Jeff Luck (Nam)
Player of the match: Josephine Nkomo (Zim)

- Zimbabwe won the toss and elected to bat.

23 April 2022
09:30
Scorecard

Namibia; 41 (17 overs)	v	Zimbabwe; 45/1 (6.3 overs)
Edelle van Zyl 9 (16); Josephine Nkomo 4/7 (3 overs)		Chipo Mugeri-Tiripano 28* (20); Victoria Hamunyela 1/25 (3.3 overs)

Zimbabwe won by 9 wickets
Trans Namib Ground, Windhoek
Umpires: Lauritz Haccou (Nam) and Andre Maasz (Nam)
Player of the match: Josephine Nkomo (Zim)

- Zimbabwe won the toss and elected to field.

23 April 2022
14:30
Scorecard

Namibia; 68 (15.2 overs)	v	Uganda; 40 (12.1 overs)
Dietlind Foerster 19* (16); Phiona Kulume 6/11 (4 overs)		Janet Mbabazi 12 (17); Sune Wittmann 5/10 (4 overs)

Namibia won by 28 runs
Trans Namib Ground, Windhoek
Umpires: Esau Heynes (Nam) and Henriette Hugo (Nam)
Player of the match: Phiona Kulume (Uga)

- Uganda won the toss and elected to field.
- Shakirah Sadick (Uga) made her WT20I debut.
- Phiona Kulume became the first player for Uganda to take a five-wicket haul in WT20Is.
- Sune Wittmann (Nam) also took her first five-wicket haul in WT20Is.

24 April 2022
09:30
Scorecard

Zimbabwe; 86 (19.2 overs)	v	Uganda; 75/7 (20 overs)
Kelis Ndhlovu 27 (34); Janet Mbabazi 4/12 (3.2 overs)		Phiona Kulume 17 (17); Anesu Mushangwe 2/8 (4 overs)

Zimbabwe won by 11 runs
Trans Namib Ground, Windhoek
Umpires: Henriette Hugo (Nam) and Jeff Luck (Nam)
Player of the match: Janet Mbabazi (Uga)

- Uganda won the toss and elected to field.

24 April 2022
14:30
Scorecard

Zimbabwe; 156/0 (20 overs)	v	Namibia; 89/6 (20 overs)
Sharne Mayers 68* (57)		Sune Wittmann 23 (28); Francisca Chipare 2/18 (3 overs)

Zimbabwe won by 67 runs
Trans Namib Ground, Windhoek
Umpires: Esau Heynes (Nam) and Andre Maasz (Nam)
Player of the match: Sharne Mayers (Zim)

- Namibia won the toss and elected to field.

25 April 2022
14:30
Scorecard

Uganda; 93/3 (20 overs)	v	Namibia; 99/5 (19.5 overs)
Janet Mbabazi 32* (50); Sune Wittmann 1/11 (3 overs)		Kayleen Green 31* (33); Janet Mbabazi 1/8 (1 over)

Namibia won by 5 wickets
Trans Namib Ground, Windhoek
Umpires: Lauritz Haccou (Nam) and Henriette Hugo (Nam)
Player of the match: Edelle van Zyl (Nam)

- Namibia won the toss and elected to field.
- Mohammed Jimia (Uga) made her WT20I debut.

== Final ==
26 April 2022
14:30
Scorecard

Namibia; 70 (13.3 overs)	v	Zimbabwe; 76/3 (9.1 overs)
Edelle van Zyl 24 (20); Nomvelo Sibanda 5/14 (3.3 overs)		Kelis Ndhlovu 33 (21); Sylvia Shihepo 2/18 (2 overs)

Zimbabwe won by 7 wickets
Trans Namib Ground, Windhoek
Umpires: Lauritz Haccou (Nam) and Andre Maasz (Nam)
Player of the match: Nomvelo Sibanda (Zim)

- Zimbabwe won the toss and elected to field.
- Nomvelo Sibanda became the first bowler for Zimbabwe to take a hat-trick in WT20Is, and took her first five-wicket haul.
