= Cricket at the 2023 African Games – Women's tournament =

2023 African Games cricket event

- Dates: 7 – 13 March 2024
- Administrator: Association of National Olympic Committees of Africa
- Cricket format: Twenty20 International (Note: Matches involving the South African side did not have T20I status.)
- Tournament format(s): Group round-robin and playoffs
- Host: Ghana
- Champions: Zimbabwe (1st title)
- Runners-up: South Africa Emerging
- Third place: Nigeria
- Participants: 8
- Matches: 16
- Player of the series: (Zimbabwe) Kelis Ndhlovu
- Most runs: (Zimbabwe) Modester Mupachikwa (150)
- Most wickets: (Nigeria) Lillian Udeh (10)

The women's cricket tournament at the 2023 African Games in Ghana took place from 7 to 13 March 2024. The matches were played with Twenty20 International (T20I) status. Eight teams participated in the event, with all the matches were held at the Achimota Oval fields in Accra. South Africa was represented by an emerging side, and their matches were played without T20I status.

Zimbabwe won a Super Over in the gold medal match against the South Africa emerging team after the match ended in a tie. Nigeria beat Uganda to claim bronze. Zimbabwe's Kelis Ndhlovu was named player of the tournament.

== Squads ==
Squads

Kenya	Namibia	Nigeria	Rwanda
Esther Wachira (c); Melvin Khagoitsa (vc, wk); Veronica Abuga; Venasa Adhiambo; Judith Ajiambo; Lavendah Idambo; Kreeshna Mehta; Charity Muthoni (wk); Jemimah Ndanu; Flavia Odhiambo; Kelvia Ogola; Mercy Sifuna; Edith Waithaka; Ann Wangui	Yasmeen Khan (c, wk); Naomi Benjamin; Jurriene Diergaardt; Rianie Esterhuizen; Dietlind Foerster; Merczerly Gorases (wk); Kayleen Green (wk); Victoria Hamunyela; Bianca Manuel; Mekelaye Mwatile; Wilka Mwatile; Sylvia Shihepo; Saima Tuhandeleni; Edelle van Zyl; Leigh-Marie Visser	Blessing Etim (c); Rukayat Abdulrasak; Shola Adekunle; Peculiar Agboya; Christabel Chukwuonye; Favour Eseigbe (wk); Sarah Etim; Victory Igbinedion; Abigail Igbobie; Esther Odunayo; Usen Peace; Lucky Piety; Rachael Samson; Esther Sandy; Salome Sunday; Lillian Udeh	Marie Bimenyimana (c); Alice Ikuzwe; Flora Irakoze (wk); Gisele Ishimwe; Henriette Ishimwe; Zurufat Ishimwe; Rosine Irera; Immaculee Muhawenimana; Belise Murekatete; Josiane Nyirankundineza; Marie Tumukunde; Sylvia Usabyimana; Clarisse Uwase; Geovanis Uwase (wk); Merveille Uwase (wk)
South Africa Emerging	Tanzania	Uganda	Zimbabwe
Nondumiso Shangase (c); Nobulumko Baneti; Jemma Botha; Annerie Dercksen; Jenna Evans; Gandhi Jafta; Leah Jones; Simone Lourens; Karabo Meso (wk); Seshnie Naidu; Kayla Reyneke; Miané Smit; Faye Tunnicliffe; Jané Winster; Caitlin Wyngaard	Neema Pius (c); Saum Borakambi; Saumu Hussein (wk); Sophia Jerome; Perice Kamunya; Sheila Kizito; Saidat Mbaki (wk); Aisha Mohamed; Saum Mtae; Hudaa Omary; Tabu Omary; Agnes Qwele; Mwanaidi Swedy; Mwanamvua Ushanga	Concy Aweko (c); Janet Mbabazi (vc); Sarah Akiteng; Lorna Anyait; Evelyn Anyipo; Marisa Ariokot; Kevin Awino (wk); Esther Iloku; Phiona Kulume; Rita Musamali; Immaculate Nakisuuyi; Stephani Nampiina; Immaculate Nandera; Gloria Obukor; Sarah Walaza	Mary-Anne Musonda (c); Kudzai Chigora; Francisca Chipare; Chiedza Dhururu (wk); Nyasha Gwanzura; Lindokuhle Mabhero; Precious Marange; Sharne Mayers; Audrey Mazvishaya; Pellagia Mujaji; Modester Mupachikwa; Kelis Ndhlovu; Josephine Nkomo; Nomvelo Sibanda; Loreen Tshuma

== Group stage ==
=== Group A ===
==== Points table ====
Pos	Team	Pld	W	L	T	NR	Pts	NRR	Qualification
1	South Africa Emerging	3	2	1	0	0	4	1.887	Advanced to the knockout stage
2	Nigeria	3	1	1	0	1	3	0.778	Advanced to the knockout stage
3	Tanzania	3	1	1	0	1	3	−1.130	
4	Namibia	3	1	2	0	0	2	−1.421	

Source: ESPNcricinfo

==== Fixtures ====
7 March 2024
09:00
Scorecard

Namibia; 89/7 (20 overs)	v	South Africa Emerging; 29/4 (6 overs)
Wilka Mwatile 37 (41); Jemma Botha 2/9 (2 overs)		Miane Smit 12* (11); Kayleen Green 3/6 (2 overs)

Namibia won by 1 run (DLS method)
Achimota Oval A, Accra
Umpires: Iknow Chabi (Zim) and Adil Kassam (Tan)
Player of the match: Kayleen Green (Nam)

- South Africa Emerging won the toss and elected to field.
- No further play was possible due to rain.

7 March 2024
09:30
Scorecard

Tanzania; 58/3 (10 overs)	v	Nigeria
Hudaa Omary 18* (26); Usen Peace 1/3 (2 overs)

No result
Achimota Oval B, Accra
Umpires: Patric Makumbi (Uga) and Sarah Dambanevana (Zim)

- Tanzania won the toss and elected to bat.
- No further play was possible due to rain.
- Usen Peace (Nga) made her T20I debut.

8 March 2024
09:00
Scorecard

Tanzania; 66 (18.3 overs)	v	South Africa Emerging; 67/2 (10.2 overs)
Tabu Omary 9 (10); Nondumiso Shangase 5/13 (3.3 overs)		Faye Tunnicliffe 29* (27); Aisha Mohamed 1/12 (2.2 overs)

South Africa Emerging won by 8 wickets
Achimota Oval A, Accra
Umpires: Habib Enesi (Nga) and Percival Sizara (Zim)
Player of the match: Nondumiso Shangase (SA)

- Tanzania won the toss and elected to bat.

8 March 2024
09:30
Scorecard

Nigeria; 111/6 (20 overs)	v	Namibia; 56 (18.4 overs)
Salome Sunday 40 (36); Kayleen Green 2/19 (4 overs)		Yasmeen Khan 17 (19); Usen Peace 3/5 (4 overs)

Nigeria won by 55 runs
Achimota Oval B, Accra
Umpires: Sarah Dambanevana (Zim) and Stacy Lackay (SA)
Player of the match: Usen Peace (Nga)

- Nigeria won the toss and elected to bat.

10 March 2024
09:00
Scorecard

Namibia; 103 (20 overs)	v	Tanzania; 107/9 (18.4 overs)
Yasmeen Khan 48 (45); Agnes Qwele 3/19 (3 overs)		Saum Mtae 41 (30); Jurriene Diergaardt 2/6 (2 overs)

Tanzania won by 1 wicket
Achimota Oval A, Accra
Umpires: Sarah Dambanevana (Zim) and Stacy Lackay (SA)
Player of the match: Saum Mtae (Tan)

- Namibia won the toss and elected to bat.

10 March 2024
09:30
Scorecard

Nigeria; 74 (18.4 overs)	v	South Africa Emerging; 78/6 (14.5 overs)
Favour Eseigbe 17 (28); Seshnie Naidu 4/13 (4 overs)		Faye Tunnicliffe 45 (34); Lillian Udeh 5/18 (4 overs)

South Africa Emerging won by 4 wickets
Achimota Oval B, Accra
Umpires: Isaac Oyieko (Ken) and Percival Sizara (Zim)
Player of the match: Seshnie Naidu (SA)

- Nigeria won the toss and elected to bat.

=== Group B ===
==== Points table ====
Pos	Team	Pld	W	L	T	NR	Pts	NRR	Qualification
1	Zimbabwe	3	3	0	0	0	6	1.438	Advanced to the knockout stage
2	Uganda	3	2	1	0	0	4	0.529	Advanced to the knockout stage
3	Kenya	3	1	2	0	0	2	−1.018	
4	Rwanda	3	0	3	0	0	0	−0.975	

Source: ESPNcricinfo

==== Fixtures ====
7 March 2024
13:45
Scorecard

Rwanda; 72/7 (14 overs)	v	Zimbabwe; 75/3 (13.4 overs)
Gisele Ishimwe 22 (28); Precious Marange 2/8 (3 overs)		Modester Mupachikwa 38 (38); Alice Ikuzwe 1/4 (1 overs)

Zimbabwe won by 7 wickets
Achimota Oval A, Accra
Umpires: Habib Enesi (Nga) and Isaac Oyieko (Ken)
Player of the match: Modester Mupachikwa (Zim)

- Rwanda won the toss and elected to bat.
- The match was reduced to 14 overs per side due to rain.

7 March 2024
13:15
Scorecard

Kenya; 63/8 (17 overs)	v	Uganda; 66/4 (16.4 overs)
Melvin Khagoitsa 24 (37); Immaculate Nakisuuyi 2/17 (4 overs)		Gloria Obukor 29* (48); Esther Wachira 1/9 (3 overs)

Uganda won by 6 wickets
Achimota Oval B, Accra
Umpires: Stacy Lackay (SA) and Percival Sizara (Zim)
Player of the match: Immaculate Nakisuuyi (Uga)

- Uganda won the toss and elected to field.
- The match was reduced to 17 overs per side due to rain.

8 March 2024
13:50
Scorecard

Uganda; 72 (20 overs)	v	Zimbabwe; 75/6 (19.4 overs)
Immaculate Nakisuuyi 17 (40); Josephine Nkomo 3/9 (4 overs)		Sharne Mayers 19 (26); Immaculate Nakisuuyi 2/10 (3 overs)

Zimbabwe won by 4 wickets
Achimota Oval A, Accra
Umpires: Adil Kassam (Tan) and Isaac Oyieko (Ken)
Player of the match: Josephine Nkomo (Zim)

- Zimbabwe won the toss and elected to field.

8 March 2024
13:45
Scorecard

Rwanda; 69 (18.3 overs)	v	Kenya; 72/3 (17 overs)
Clarisse Uwase 24 (28); Jemimah Ndanu 3/21 (4 overs)		Esther Wachira 42* (49); Rosine Irera 2/11 (4 overs)

Kenya won by 7 wickets
Achimota Oval B, Accra
Umpires: Iknow Chabi (Zim) and Patric Makumbi (Uga)
Player of the match: Esther Wachira (Ken)

- Rwanda won the toss and elected to bat.

10 March 2024
13:15
Scorecard

Zimbabwe; 142/5 (20 overs)	v	Kenya; 74/4 (20 overs)
Modester Mupachikwa 40 (40); Flavia Odhiambo 3/29 (4 overs)		Melvin Khagoitsa 30 (47); Precious Marange 1/5 (2 overs)

Zimbabwe won by 68 runs
Achimota Oval A, Accra
Umpires: Adil Kassam (Tan) and Patric Makumbi (Uga)
Player of the match: Modester Mupachikwa (Zim)

- Kenya won the toss and elected to field.

10 March 2024
13:45
Scorecard

Uganda; 106/2 (20 overs)	v	Rwanda; 76/8 (20 overs)
Immaculate Nakisuuyi 57* (56); Alice Ikuzwe 1/10 (4 overs)		Marie Bimenyimana 28 (39); Immaculate Nakisuuyi 4/15 (4 overs)

Uganda won by 30 runs
Achimota Oval B, Accra
Umpires: Iknow Chabi (Zim) and Habib Enesi (Nga)
Player of the match: Immaculate Nakisuuyi (Uga)

- Rwanda won the toss and elected to field.

== Knockout stage ==
=== Bracket ===
Semi-finals
A1	South Africa Emerging	122/4 (20 overs)
B2	Uganda	72 (18.4 overs)
B1	Zimbabwe	75/5 (16 overs)
A2	Nigeria	74/9 (20 overs)

Gold medal match
A1	South Africa Emerging	112/8 (20 overs); 2/2 (Super Over)
B1	Zimbabwe	112/5 (20 overs); 4/0 (Super Over)
Bronze medal match
B2	Uganda	76/8 (20 overs)
A2	Nigeria	78/7 (19.2 overs)

=== Semi-finals ===
11 March 2024
09:30
Scorecard

South Africa Emerging; 122/4 (20 overs)	v	Uganda; 72 (18.4 overs)
Nondumiso Shangase 38 (42); Concy Aweko 2/27 (4 overs)		Esther Iloku 19 (33); Kayla Reyneke 3/13 (4 overs)

South Africa won by 50 runs
Achimota Oval A, Accra
Umpires: Sarah Dambanevana (Zim) and Adil Kassam (Tan)
Player of the match: Nondumiso Shangase (SA)

- Uganda won the toss and elected to field.

11 March 2024
13:50
Scorecard

Nigeria; 74/9 (20 overs)	v	Zimbabwe; 75/5 (16 overs)
Lucky Piety 13 (14); Kelis Ndhlovu 3/12 (4 overs)		Modester Mupachikwa 26 (43); Peculiar Agboya 2/12 (4 overs)

Zimbabwe won by 5 wickets
Achimota Oval A, Accra
Umpires: Stacy Lackay (SA) and Isaac Oyieko (Ken)
Player of the match: Kelis Ndhlovu (Zim)

- Nigeria won the toss and elected to bat.

=== Bronze medal match ===
13 March 2024
09:30
Scorecard

Uganda; 76/8 (20 overs)	v	Nigeria; 78/7 (19.2 overs)
Immaculate Nakisuuyi 21 (43); Peculiar Agboya 3/11 (4 overs)		Salome Sunday 37 (50); Janet Mbabazi 2/8 (4 overs)

Nigeria won by 3 wickets
Achimota Oval A, Accra
Umpires: Sarah Dambanevana (Zim) and Stacy Lackay (SA)
Player of the match: Salome Sunday (Nga)

- Nigeria won the toss and elected to field.
- Concy Aweko (Uga) took her 100th wicket in T20Is.

=== Gold medal match ===
13 March 2024
13:50
Scorecard

Zimbabwe; 112/5 (20 overs)	v	South Africa Emerging; 112/8 (20 overs)
Modester Mupachikwa 31 (49); Nondumiso Shangase 1/9 (2 overs)		Miane Smit 31* (32); Kelis Ndhlovu 2/21 (3 overs)

Match tied (Zimbabwe won the Super Over)
Achimota Oval A, Accra
Umpires: Patric Makumbi (Uga) and Isaac Oyieko (Ken)
Player of the match: Kelis Ndhlovu (Zim)

- South Africa Emerging won the toss and elected to field.
- Super Over: South Africa 2/2, Zimbabwe 4/0.

== See also ==
- Cricket at the 2023 African Games – Men's tournament
