= Botswana women's cricket team in Namibia in 2018–19 =

Botswanan women's cricket team in Namibia in 2018–19
| | Namibia women | Botswana women |
- Dates: 31 March – 3 April 2019
| Captains | Yasmeen Khan | Laura Mophakedi |

Twenty20 International series
- Results: Namibia women won the 7-match series 5–0
| Most runs | Kayleen Green (144) | Florence Samanyika (46) |
| Most wickets | Maryke Short (8) | Banyana Gaanamong (6) |

The Botswana women's cricket team toured Namibia in March–April 2019 to play a five-match Women's Twenty20 International (WT20I) series. The venue for all of the matches was the United Ground in Windhoek. The tournament provided Namibia with some preparation for the 2019 ICC Women's Qualifier Africa. Both matches due to be played on the first day of the series (31 March) were abandoned without a toss due to rain, and rescheduled for the reserve day (2 April), with the series listed on Cricinfo as a seven-match series. Namibia won the series 5–0.

== WT20I series ==
=== 1st WT20I ===
31 March 2019
Scorecard

| Namibia | v | Botswana |

Match abandoned
United Ground, Windhoek
Umpires: Ewoud Lassen (Nam) and Hannes van Vuuren (Nam)

- No toss.
- Match abandoned due to rain.

=== 2nd WT20I ===
31 March 2019
Scorecard

| Namibia | v | Botswana |

Match abandoned
United Ground, Windhoek
Umpires: Ewoud Lassen (Nam) and Hannes van Vuuren (Nam)

- No toss.
- Match abandoned due to rain.

=== 3rd WT20I ===
1 April 2019
Scorecard

| Botswana; 50 (16.4 overs) | v | Namibia; 51/3 (6.3 overs) |
| Goabilwe Matome 6 (8); Eveleen Kejarukua 3/2 (1.4 overs) | | Kayleen Green 18* (18); Banyana Gaanamong 1/8 (1 over); Thandiwe Legabile 1/8 (1 over) |

Namibia won by 7 wickets
United Ground, Windhoek
Umpires: Hein Heydenrych (Nam) and Hannes van Vuuren (Nam)

- Namibia won the toss and elected to field.
- Maryke Short, Irene van Zyl (Nam) and Thapelo Modise (Bot) all made their WT20I debuts.

=== 4th WT20I ===
2 April 2019
Scorecard

| Namibia; 161/4 (20 overs) | v | Botswana; 73 (19.2 overs) |
| Kayleen Green 37 (29); Thandiwe Legabile 1/23 (4 overs) | | Olebogeng Batisani 25 (47); Sylvia Shihepo 3/6 (3.2 overs) |

Namibia won by 88 runs
United Ground, Windhoek
Umpires: Pieter Groenewald (Nam) and Hein Heydenrych (Nam)

- Botswana won the toss and elected to field.
- Mikala Bosman (Nam) and Tuelo Shadrack (Bot) both made their WT20I debuts.

=== 5th WT20I ===
2 April 2019
Scorecard

| Botswana; 58/7 (20 overs) | v | Namibia; 59/1 (7.1 overs) |
| Laura Mophakedi 13 (25); Maryke Short 4/14 (overs) | | Kayleen Green 27* (23); Mimmie Ramafifi 1/16 (2 overs) |

Namibia won by 9 wickets
United Ground, Windhoek
Umpires: Pieter Groenewald (Nam) and Hein Heydenrych (Nam)

- Botswana won the toss and elected to bat.

=== 6th WT20I ===
3 April 2019
Scorecard

| Namibia; 162/1 (20 overs) | v | Botswana; 76 (18.2 overs) |
| Kayleen Green 57 (52); Banyana Gaanamong 1/14 (2 overs) | | Banyana Gaanamong 19 (27); Kayleen Green 2/14 (4.2 overs) |

Namibia won by 86 runs
United Ground, Windhoek
Umpires: Hein Heydenrych (Nam) and Hannes van Vuuren (Nam)

- Namibia won the toss and elected to bat.
- Kayleen Green bowled 1 illegal over past the limit of 4 during Botswana Women's innings.

=== 7th WT20I ===
3 April 2019
Scorecard

| Namibia; 163/8 (20 overs) | v | Botswana; 75/5 (20 overs) |
| Anneri van Schoor 39* (30); Banyana Gaanamong 4/30 (4 overs) | | Florence Samanyika 36 (58); Kayleen Green 3/8 (4 overs) |

Namibia won by 88 runs
United Ground, Windhoek
Umpires: Pieter Groenewald (Nam) and Hannes van Vuuren (Nam)

- Namibia won the toss and elected to bat.
- Anneri van Schoor (Nam) and Ellen Gare (Bot) both made their WT20I debuts.
