= Lochlands Park =

Cricket ground in Arbroath, Angus, Scotland

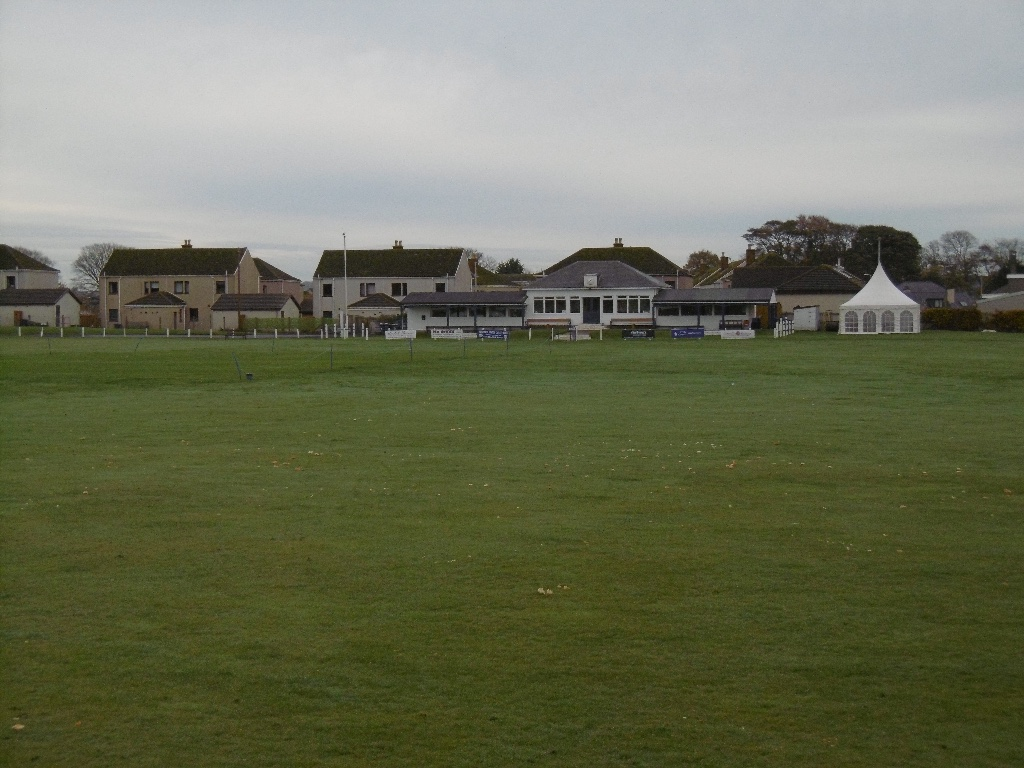
- Interactive map of Lochlands Park

Ground information
- Location: Arbroath, Angus
- Country: Scotland
- Coordinates: 56°33′54″N 2°36′21″W
- Home club: Arbroath United Cricket Club
- Establishment: 1887

International information
- First women's T20I: 31 August 2019: Netherlands v Thailand
- Last women's T20I: 7 September 2019: Scotland v Netherlands
- As of 24 February 2020; Source: CricketArchive

Lochlands Park or Lochlands is a cricket ground in Arbroath, Angus, Scotland. It has been the home ground of Arbroath United Cricket Club since 1887.

The club was formed in 1846, playing initially at Tutties Neuk and then on the municipally owned West Common, but the lack of an enclosed private ground meant they had difficulty in attracting top-class clubs to play in Arbroath. During 1886 the club were able to gain the lease of six acres of land on the Lochlands estate, owned by former cricketer Mr W. F. Macdonald. A pavilion was erected on the east side of the new ground, which was officially opened with a match between Arbroath United and Perthshire on 14 May 1887.

In 1925, the club decided to add tennis courts and a putting course at Lochlands. In 1958, a decision was taken to build a new pavilion in the ground's southwest corner.

When Scotland successfully bid to host the 2019 ICC Women's World Twenty20 Qualifier, Cricket Scotland chose to stage the tournament in the Dundee and Angus area, with ten matches taking place at each venue, Lochlands and Forthill. After staging two warmup matches prior to the tournament, Lochlands hosted its first full Women's Twenty20 International matches on 31 August 2019, Netherlands against Thailand and Ireland against Namibia.
