= Nadia Gruny =

American cricketer

Personal information
- Full name: Nadia Theresa Gruny
- Born: 23 April 1984 (age 42); Scarborough, Trinidad and Tobago
- Batting: Right-handed
- Bowling: Right-arm medium

International information
- National side: United States
- T20I debut (cap 5): 17 May 2019 v Canada
- Last T20I: 7 September 2019 v Namibia

Career statistics
Competition	WT20I
Matches	8
Runs scored	100
Batting average	20.00
100s/50s	0/1
Top score	53*
Catches/stumpings	2/–
- Source: Cricinfo, 4 May 2021

Nadia Gruny (born 23 April 1984) is an American former cricketer. She made her Women's Twenty20 International (WT20I) debut for the United States women's cricket team on 17 May 2019, against Canada, in the 2019 ICC Women's Qualifier Americas tournament.

In August 2019, she was named in United States' squad for the 2019 ICC Women's World Twenty20 Qualifier tournament in Scotland. She played in the United States' opening match of the tournament, on 31 August 2019, against Scotland. She was the leading run-scorer for the United States in the tournament, with 98 runs in five matches.

In February 2021, she was named in the Women's National Training Group by the USA Cricket Women's National Selectors ahead of the 2021 Women's Cricket World Cup Qualifier and the 2021 ICC Women's T20 World Cup Americas Qualifier tournaments. In September 2021, USA Cricket confirmed that Gruny had retired from playing international cricket.
