= Reehana Khan =

Namibian cricketer (born 1999)

Personal information
- Full name: Reehana Khan
- Born: 7 January 1999 (age 27)
- Batting: Right-handed
- Bowling: Right-arm medium

International information
- National side: Namibia
- T20I debut (cap 7): 20 August 2018 v Malawi
- Last T20I: 7 June 2021 v Rwanda

Career statistics
Competition	WT20I
Matches	23
Runs scored	46
Batting average	6.57
100s/50s	0/0
Top score	17*
Balls bowled	136
Wickets	9
Bowling average	14.55
5 wickets in innings	0
10 wickets in match	0
Best bowling	2/6
Catches/stumpings	2/–
- Source: Cricinfo, 9 June 2021

Reehana Khan (born 7 January 1999) is a Namibian cricketer. She made her Women's Twenty20 International (WT20I) debut for the Namibia women's cricket team on 20 August 2018, against Malawi, in the 2018 Botswana Cricket Association Women's T20I Series. It was the first WT20I match to be played by Namibia.

In August 2019, she was named in Namibia's squad for the 2019 ICC Women's World Twenty20 Qualifier tournament in Scotland. She played in Namibia's opening match of the tournament, on 31 August 2019, against Ireland. In May 2021, she was named in Namibia's squad for the 2021 Kwibuka Women's T20 Tournament in Rwanda.
