= Petro Enright =

Namibian cricketer (born 1983)

Personal information
- Full name: Maria Petronella Enright
- Born: 15 February 1983 (age 43)
- Batting: Right-handed
- Bowling: Right-arm medium

International information
- National side: Namibia
- T20I debut (cap 21): 31 August 2019 v Ireland
- Last T20I: 5 September 2019 v Scotland

Career statistics
Competition	WT20I
Matches	4
Runs scored	42
Batting average	10.50
100s/50s	0/0
Top score	20
Balls bowled	21
Wickets	0
Bowling average	–
5 wickets in innings	–
10 wickets in match	–
Best bowling	–
Catches/stumpings	0/–
- Source: Cricinfo, 5 September 2019

Maria Petronella "Petro" Enright (born 15 February 1983) is a Namibian cricketer. In August 2019, she was named in Namibia's squad for the 2019 ICC Women's World Twenty20 Qualifier tournament in Scotland. She made her Women's Twenty20 International (WT20I) debut for the Namibia women's cricket team on 31 August 2019, against Ireland, during the 2019 ICC Women's World Twenty20 Qualifier.
