= Samantha Ramautar =

American cricketer (born 1987)

Personal information
- Full name: Samantha Ramautar
- Born: February 11, 1987 (age 39); Linden, Guyana
- Batting: Right-handed
- Bowling: Right-arm offbreak
- Role: All-rounder

International information
- National side: United States
- T20I debut (cap 7): 17 May 2019 v Canada
- Last T20I: 7 September 2019 v Namibia

Career statistics
Competition	WT20I
Matches	7
Runs scored	13
Batting average	6.50
100s/50s	0/0
Top score	5
Balls bowled	126
Wickets	4
Bowling average	27.25
5 wickets in innings	0
10 wickets in match	0
Best bowling	2/10
Catches/stumpings	1/–
- Source: Cricinfo, 4 May 2021

Samantha Ramautar (born 11 February 1987) is an American former cricketer. She made her international debut at the 2011 Women's Cricket World Cup Qualifier. In March 2019, she was named in the United States team for the 2019 ICC Women's Qualifier Americas tournament against Canada. She made her WT20I debut for the United States against Canada in the Americas Qualifier on 17 May 2019.

In August 2019, she was named in the American squad for the 2019 ICC Women's World Twenty20 Qualifier tournament in Scotland. She played in the United States' opening match of the tournament, on 31 August 2019, against Scotland.

In February 2021, she was named in the Women's National Training Group by the USA Cricket Women's National Selectors ahead of the 2021 Women's Cricket World Cup Qualifier and the 2021 ICC Women's T20 World Cup Americas Qualifier tournaments. In September 2021, USA Cricket confirmed that Ramautar had retired from playing international cricket.
