= Kelis Ndhlovu =

Zimbabwean cricketer

Personal information
- Full name: Kelis Tanyaradzwa Ndhlovu
- Born: 16 November 2005 (age 20); Chitungwiza, Harare Province, Zimbabwe
- Nickname: Monte
- Batting: Left-handed
- Bowling: Slow left arm orthodox
- Role: Batting all-rounder

International information
- National side: Zimbabwe
- ODI debut (cap 19): 19 April 2023 v Thailand
- Last ODI: 28 March 2024 v Papua New Guinea
- T20I debut (cap 23): 20 April 2022 v Namibia
- Last T20I: 1 May 2024 v Netherlands

Domestic team information
- Years: Team
- 2020/21–present: Eagles women's cricket team

Career statistics
Competition	WODI	WT20I
Matches	9	39
Runs scored	102	610
Batting average	12.75	19.67
100s/50s	0/0	0/2
Top score	34	58*
Balls bowled	438	665
Wickets	15	36
Bowling average	16.00	17.19
5 wickets in innings	1	0
10 wickets in match	0	0
Best bowling	5/22	3/12
Catches/stumpings	2/–	3/–
- Source: Cricinfo, 31 May 2024

Kelis Ndhlovu (born 16 November 2005) is a Zimbabwean cricketer who plays for the Zimbabwe women's national cricket team. She is an all-rounder who plays as a left-arm orthodox bowler and a left-hand batter. Her father, Eddie Ndhlovu, is a well-known filmmaker in the country.

She took the most wickets in the 2022 ICC Women's T20 World Cup Qualifier in the UAE. She represented Zimbabwe in the 2023 Under-19 Women's T20 World Cup. In 2024, she won Player of the Tournament as Zimbabwe won a gold medal in the African Games.

On 19 April 2023, she became the first bowler to take a five-wicket haul (5/22) for Zimbabwe in women's ODIs. However, Zimbabwe lost the match despite her heroics, due to a six-wicket haul (6/6) in the same match by Thailand's Thipatcha Putthawong.

== Background ==
Ndhlovu took up cricket at primary school after her friend convinced her to. Her friend's mother wanted her friend to play cricket, which made Ndhlovu and her friend play together. Though her friend dropped out of the sport, she continued playing. In Grade Three, she set herself the target of " taking either player, batter or bowler of the match, or fielder of the tournament" in every game she played.

She did her primary schooling at Prince Edward School in Harare. Later, she studied at Sake 3 High, followed by Wise Owl. She simultaneously pursues her studies and plays cricket for her country. She utilizes private tutors, and when on a tour, she takes online classes. She said she "stays up till 3 a.m. every day studying."

She idolizes Zimbabwean players Modester Mupachikwa and Milton Shumba.

== Career ==
Ndhlovu, at age 16, has won two titles for the Eagles in five months. On 20 April 2022, Ndhlovu made her international debut for Zimbabwe against Namibia in the Capricorn Tri-Series at Windhoek. Four days later, she scored her maiden T20I fifty. She then shared a 156-run unbeaten partnership with Sharne Mayers, which she described as "the best moment ever". Later in the year, she played in the 2022 ICC Women's T20 World Cup Qualifier in the UAE, where she was the leading wicket-taker with 11 wickets. Already having senior international experience, she played for Zimbabwe in the 2023 Under-19 Women's T20 World Cup. Before the tournament, she was part of the three-week U19 training camp and a preparatory tour against South Africa. In March 2023, she scored her maiden List-A century, scoring 109 off 102 balls for the Eagles against the Rhinos. She made her ODI debut nearly a year after her T20I debut, on 19 April 2023 against Thailand.

On her debut, she took a five-wicket haul for 22 runs, although Zimbabwe ended in a losing cause. At 17 years and 154 days, she became the third youngest woman to take a five-wicket haul in ODI cricket. She took ten wickets at an average of 5.80 in her debut series, despite her side being whitewashed 0-3. In February 2024, she took four wickets for nine runs in a twenty-over game against OMTEX Cricket Institute in Mumbai. She represented Zimbabwe in the 2024 African Games in March 2024 (the first edition of African Games to feature cricket), and hit the winning runs against the South Africa Emerging team, to seal the gold medal. She was named Player of the Match in the final and Player of the Tournament in the African Games. She was invited to participate in the 2024 FairBreak Invitational in Antigua; however, no such tournament seemed to materialize.

Ndhlovu has been nominated for ICC Women's Player of the Month for April 2023. She became the youngest player nominated for the ICC monthly award.
