= ICC Africa Women's Twenty20 Championship =

Africa Women's T20 Championship
- Administrator: ICC Africa
- Format: Twenty20
- Tournament format: Round-robin
- Number of teams: Six (2014)
- Current champion: Zimbabwe (2014)
- Most successful: Zimbabwe (3 titles)

The ICC Africa Women's T20 Championship is an international cricket tournament contested between the national women's sides from the African development region of the International Cricket Council (ICC).

The first African regional tournament for women's teams was played in Tanzania in 2004, and known simply as the Women's Championship. The next two regional tournaments, in 2006 and 2010, served as part of the qualification process for the Women's World Cup. All matches prior to 2011 were played in the 50-over format (as used in One Day Internationals), but since then, the Twenty20 format has been used, with the tournament played annually. The winners in even-numbered years (so far, 2012 and 2014) proceed to a qualification tournament for the Women's World Twenty20.

Only three teams have participated in every edition of the tournament – Kenya, Tanzania, and Uganda. South Africa, a full member of the ICC, has participated only once, in 2010, when a poor result at the 2009 World Cup meant they had to re-qualify through regional competitions. However, South African invitational teams have participated in every edition since 2011, winning each time. Zimbabwe was the highest-ranked national team in two of those tournaments, which, combined with an additional first-place finish in 2006, makes them the most successful team.

== Results ==
In the below table, the results of the South African invitational teams are disregarded, and the highest-ranking national teams are listed as the winner and runner-up:

| Year | Host(s) | Venue(s) | Result | | |
| Year | Host(s) | Venue(s) | Winner | Margin | Runner-up |
|---|---|---|---|---|---|
| 2004 | Tanzania | Dar es Salaam | Tanzania; 51/2 (14.2 overs) | Tanzania won by 8 wickets scorecard | Uganda; 50 (25.1 overs) |
| 2006 | Kenya | Nairobi | Zimbabwe; 6 points | Zimbabwe won on points table | Tanzania; 4 points |
| 2010 | Kenya | Nairobi | South Africa; 314/2 (50 overs) | South Africa won by 281 runs scorecard | Zimbabwe; 33 (20 overs) |
| 2011 | Uganda | Entebbe, Kampala | Uganda +2.952 NRR | Uganda won on net run rate table | Tanzania +2.188 NRR |
| 2012 | Tanzania | Dar es Salaam | Zimbabwe; 9 points | Zimbabwe won on points table | Tanzania; 6 points |
| 2013 | Tanzania | Dar es Salaam | Uganda; 6 points | Uganda won on points table | Tanzania; 4 points |
| 2014 | South Africa | Benoni | Zimbabwe; 8 points | Zimbabwe won on points table | Tanzania; 6 points |

== Performance by team ==
Legend

- 1st – Champions
- 2nd – Runners-up
- 3rd – Third place
- — Hosts
- Top-ranked national teams in years where an invitational team won are underlined

| Team | (Tanzania) 2004 | (Kenya) 2006 | (Kenya) 2010 | (Uganda) 2011 | (Tanzania) 2012 | (Tanzania) 2013 | (South Africa) 2014 | Total |
|---|---|---|---|---|---|---|---|---|
| Kenya | 3rd | 4th | 4th | 4th | 6th | 4th | 5th | 7 |
| Namibia | 4th | — | — | 3rd | 5th | 5th | 6th | 5 |
| Nigeria | — | — | — | 5th | — | — | — | 1 |
| Sierra Leone | — | — | — | 6th | — | — | — | 1 |
| South Africa | — | — | 1st | — | — | — | — | 1 |
| (South Africa) South African XI | — | — | — | — | 1st | 1st | 1st | 3 |
| Tanzania | 1st | 2nd | 5th | 2nd | 3rd | 3rd | 3rd | 7 |
| Uganda | 2nd | 3rd | 3rd | 1st | 4th | 2nd | 4th | 7 |
| Zimbabwe | — | 1st | — | 2nd | 2nd | — | 2nd | 4 |

== See also ==
- ICC Africa Twenty20 Championship
- ICC Africa Under-19 Championships
- World Cricket League Africa Region
