= Eveleen Kejarukua =

Namibian cricketer (born 1993)

Personal information
- Full name: Eveleen Uahak Kejarukua
- Born: 16 September 1993 (age 33)
- Batting: Right-handed
- Bowling: Right-arm medium

International information
- National side: Namibia
- T20I debut (cap 13): 23 August 2018 v Lesotho
- Last T20I: 8 May 2019 v Sierra Leone
- Source: Cricinfo, 27 August 2019

Eveleen Kejarukua (born 16 September 1993) is a Namibian cricketer. She made her Women's Twenty20 International (WT20I) debut for the Namibia women's cricket team on 23 August 2018, against Lesotho, in the 2018 Botswana Cricket Association Women's T20I Series.

In August 2019, she was named in Namibia's squad for the 2019 ICC Women's World Twenty20 Qualifier tournament in Scotland.
