= 2018 Botswana Cricket Association Women's T20I Series =

International tournament in Gaborone

- Dates: 20 – 25 August 2018
- Administrator: Botswana Cricket Association
- Cricket format: Twenty20 International
- Tournament format(s): Round Robin and play-offs
- Host: Botswana
- Champions: Namibia
- Runners-up: Sierra Leone
- Participants: 6
- Matches: 18
- Player of the series: (Namibia) Adri van der Merwe
- Most runs: (Sierra Leone) Ann Marie Kamara (199)
- Most wickets: (Botswana) Botsogo Mpedi (14)

The 2018 Botswana Cricket Association Women's T20I Series was a Twenty20 International (T20I) cricket tournament held in Gaborone, Botswana from 20 to 25 August 2018. The participants were the women's national sides of Botswana, Lesotho, Malawi, Mozambique, Namibia and Sierra Leone. Matches were recognised as official T20I games as per ICC's announcement that full T20I status would apply to all official matches played between women's teams of associate members after 1 July 2018. Zambia also took part in the tournament but their matches did not have T20I status due to their squad including a non-eligible player, and their results are not included in the available coverage. The matches were played at the two Botswana Cricket Association Oval grounds (Oval 1 and Oval 2), in Gaborone. Namibia won the tournament after winning all of their matches, including a victory over Sierra Leone in the final.

== Round-robin stage ==
=== Points table ===
Team	P	W	L	T	NR	Pts	NRR
Namibia	5	5	0	0	0	10	+5.701
Sierra Leone	5	4	1	0	0	8	+1.039
Botswana	5	3	2	0	0	6	+2.183
Mozambique	5	2	3	0	0	4	–0.783
Malawi	5	1	4	0	0	2	–1.563
Lesotho	5	0	5	0	0	0	–5.160

=== Matches ===
20 August 2018
Scorecard

Botswana; 164/4 (20 overs)	v	Lesotho; 40 (14.3 overs)
Thandiwe Legabile 42* (52); Boitumelo Lekau 1/19 (3 overs)		Majane Moalosi 6* (15); Botsogo Mpedi 6/8 (2.3 overs)

Botswana won by 124 runs
Botswana Cricket Association Oval 1, Gaborone
Player of the match: Botsogo Mpedi (Bot)

- Lesotho won the toss and elected to field.
- Olebogeng Batisani, Onneile Keitsemang, Thandiwe Legabile, Bontle Madimabe, Goabilwe Matome, Amantle Mokgotlhe, Laura Mophakedi, Shameelah Mosweu, Botsogo Mpedi, Mimmie Ramafifi, Florence Samanyika (Bot), Tshepang Khabo, Rethabie Khasana, Thandi Kobeli, Tharollo Koloi, Boitumelo Lekau, Mpitsoane Matobole, Majane Moalosi, Paballo Pheko, Boitumelo Phelenyane, Tanki Ramabitsa and Matsooana Tsarsi (Les) all made their T20I debuts.

20 August 2018
Scorecard

Malawi; 53/8 (20 overs)	v	Namibia; 54/1 (5.1 overs)
Triphonia Luka 8 (28); Kayleen Green 3/11 (4 overs)		Yasmeen Khan 23* (14); Brenda Ndipo 1/12 (1 over)

Namibia won by 9 wickets
Botswana Cricket Association Oval 2, Gaborone
Player of the match: Kayleen Green (Nam)

- Namibia won the toss and elected to field.
- Meria Dailesi, Dalida Dzimau, Shalon Dzimu, Shahida Hussein, Thandi Katunga, Triphonia Luka, Mary Mabvuka, Tadala Mpandakwaya, Brenda Ndipo, Dalitso Ndipo, Vanessa Phiri (Mwi), Jurriene Diergaardt, Dietlind Foerster, Kayleen Green, Victoria Hamunyela, Reehana Khan, Yasmeen Khan, Wilka Mwatile, Sylvia Shihepo, Namusha Shiomwenyo, Ester Simeon and Adri van der Merwe (Nam) all made their T20I debuts.

20 August 2018
Scorecard

Mozambique; 99 (18.5 overs)	v	Sierra Leone; 102/4 (18.3 overs)
Eulalia Moiane 38 (19); Zainab Kamara 4/7 (1.5 overs)		Adama Kamara 32* (30); Isabel Chuma 4/21 (4 overs)

Sierra Leone won by 6 wickets
Botswana Cricket Association Oval 1, Gaborone

- Sierra Leone won the toss and elected to field.
- Ameliana Arroz, Isabel Chuma, Palmira Cuinica, Fatima Guirrugo, Christina Magaia, Olga Marsolo, Maria Matine, Eulalia Moiane, Olga Mondlane, Cecelia Murrombe, Angelica Salomao (Moz), Festina Bangur, Linda Bull, Adama Kamara, Aminata Kamara, Ann Marie Kamara, Zainab Kamara, Ramatu Kassim, Mabinty King, Isatu Koroma, Janet Kowa and Mabinty Sankoh (Sle) all made their T20I debuts.

20 August 2018
Scorecard

Botswana; 128/6 (20 overs)	v	Malawi; 70 (17.1 overs)
Laura Mophakedi 38 (49); Mary Mabvuka 2/13 (4 overs)		Mary Mabvuka 17 (44); Mimmie Ramafifi 2/10 (4 overs)

Botswana won by 58 runs
Botswana Cricket Association Oval 2, Gaborone

- Malawi won the toss and elected to field.
- Precious Modimo (Bot), Tricia Chabila, Nellie Gamaliyele and Sarah Tambala (Mwi) all made their T20I debuts.

21 August 2018
Scorecard

Sierra Leone; 83/7 (20 overs)	v	Namibia; 84/3 (11.1 overs)
Ann Marie Kamara 20 (22); Wilka Mwatile 2/15 (4 overs)		Adri van der Merwe 28* (28); Janet Kowa 2/22 (3 overs)

Namibia won by 7 wickets
Botswana Cricket Association Oval 1, Gaborone
Player of the match: Adri van der Merwe (Nam)

- Namibia won the toss and elected to field.

21 August 2018
Scorecard

Mozambique; 157/3 (20 overs)	v	Lesotho; 87 (19.1 overs)
Olga Mondlane 71 (66); Tanki Ramabitsa 2/12 (3 overs)		Matsooana Tsarsi 18 (36); Alcinda Cossa 2/4 (1.1 overs)

Mozambique won by 70 runs
Botswana Cricket Association Oval 2, Gaborone

- Lesotho won the toss and elected to field.
- Mathuto Mohasane (Les) and Alcinda Cossa (Moz) both made their T20I debuts.

21 August 2018
Scorecard

Mozambique; 80/7 (20 overs)	v	Botswana; 82/0 (11.4 overs)
Christina Magaia 12* (10); Mimmie Ramafifi 2/3 (4 overs)		Olebogeng Batisani 45* (44)

Botswana won by 10 wickets
Botswana Cricket Association Oval 1, Gaborone

- Mozambique won the toss and elected to bat.

21 August 2018
Scorecard

Malawi; 135/8 (20 overs)	v	Lesotho; 72/6 (20 overs)
Meria Dailesi 26 (33); Rethabie Khasana 2/23 (3 overs)		Matsooana Tsarsi 31* (41); Shahida Hussein 3/13 (4 overs)

Malawi won by 63 runs
Botswana Cricket Association Oval 2, Gaborone

- Lesotho won the toss and elected to field.
- Limpho Khotso (Les) made her T20I debut.

23 August 2018
Scorecard

Botswana; 116/3 (20 overs)	v	Sierra Leone; 117/4 (19.5 overs)
Laura Mophakedi 37 (51); Adama Kamara 1/10 (2 overs)		Mabinty Sankoh 23 (33); Thandiwe Legabile 1/18 (4 overs)

Sierra Leone won by 6 wickets
Botswana Cricket Association Oval 1, Gaborone

- Sierra Leone won the toss and elected to field.
- Banyana Gaanamong (Bot) and Fatmata Parkinson (Sle) both made their T20I debuts.

23 August 2018
Scorecard

Mozambique; 25 (11 overs)	v	Namibia; 26/0 (2.1 overs)
Olga Mondlane 11 (17); Namusha Shiomwenyo 3/6 (4 overs)		Yasmeen Khan 21* (10)

Namibia won by 10 wickets
Botswana Cricket Association Oval 2, Gaborone
Player of the match: Namusha Shiomwenyo (Nam)

- Mozambique won the toss and elected to field.
- Edelle van Zyl (Nam) made her T20I debut.

23 August 2018
Scorecard

Namibia; 210/5 (20 overs)	v	Lesotho; 31/7 (20 overs)
Yasmeen Khan 61 (33); Tanki Ramabitsa 2/36 (4 overs)		Mpitsoane Matobole 6 (9); Kayleen Green 2/5 (4 overs)

Namibia won by 179 runs
Botswana Cricket Association Oval 1, Gaborone
Player of the match: Yasmeen Khan (Nam)

- Lesotho won the toss and elected to field.
- Constancia Kauripeke and Eveleen Kejarukua (Nam) both made their T20I debuts.

23 August 2018
Scorecard

Sierra Leone; 148/3 (20 overs)	v	Malawi; 92/6 (20 overs)
Aminata Kamara 47* (46); Mary Mabvuka 1/21 (2 overs)		Shahida Hussein 21 (33); Zainab Kamara 2/9 (4 overs)

Sierra Leone won by 56 runs
Botswana Cricket Association Oval 2, Gaborone

- Sierra Leone won the toss and elected to bat.

24 August 2018
Scorecard

Sierra Leone; 157/3 (20 overs)	v	Lesotho; 77/6 (20 overs)
Ann Marie Kamara 84* (69); Tshepang Khabo 1/23 (3 overs)		Thandi Kobeli 17 (29); Aminata Kamara 2/16 (4 overs)

Sierra Leone won by 80 runs
Botswana Cricket Association Oval 1, Gaborone

- Sierra Leone won the toss and elected to bat

24 August 2018
Scorecard

Mozambique; 122/8 (20 overs)	v	Malawi; 109 (19.1 overs)
Eulalia Moiane 30 (31); Dalida Dzimau 4/27 (4 overs)		Triphonia Luka 21 (31); Isabel Chuma 3/33 (4 overs)

Mozambique won by 13 runs
Botswana Cricket Association Oval 2, Gaborone

- Mozambique won the toss and elected to bat.

24 August 2018
Scorecard

Botswana; 93/4 (20 overs)	v	Namibia; 94/4 (16.1 overs)
Goabilwe Matome 33* (45); Sylvia Shihepo 3/25 (4 overs)		Adri van der Merwe 28 (39); Botsogo Mpedi 2/16 (3.1 overs)

Namibia won by 6 wickets
Botswana Cricket Association Oval 1, Gaborone

- Namibia won the toss and elected to field.

== Playoffs ==
=== Fifth-place playoff ===
25 August 2018
Scorecard

Lesotho; 49 (17.3 overs)	v	Malawi; 50/1 (6 overs)
Tshepang Khabo 12* (42); Dalida Dzimau 2/11 (3.3 overs)		Tadala Mpandakwaya 15* (17); Tanki Ramabitsa 1/11 (1 over)

Malawi won by 9 wickets
Botswana Cricket Association Oval 1, Gaborone

- Malawi won the toss and elected to field.
- Nthati Tsiame (Les) made her T20I debut.

=== Third-place playoff ===
25 August 2018
Scorecard

Botswana; 107/8 (20 overs)	v	Mozambique; 108/1 (13.1 overs)
Isabel Chuma 23 (15); Botsogo Mpedi 3/11 (4 overs)		Olebogeng Batisani 35* (51); Ameliana Arroz 1/16 (1 over)

Botswana won by 9 wickets
Botswana Cricket Association Oval 2, Gaborone

- Mozambique won the toss and elected to field.
- Vanessa Thari Thari (Bot) made her T20I debut.

=== Final ===
25 August 2018
Scorecard

Sierra Leone; 80/4 (20 overs)	v	Namibia; 81/1 (11.1 overs)
Mabinty Sankoh 23 (40); Jurriene Diergaardt 1/13 (4 overs)		Yasmeen Khan 37 (38); Zainab Kamara 1/5 (1 over)

Namibia won by 9 wickets
Botswana Cricket Association Oval 1, Gaborone

- Namibia won the toss and elected to field.
