= Lauritz Haccou =

Namibian cricketer (born 1994)

Personal information
- Born: 24 April 1994 (age 32)

Umpiring information
- WT20Is umpired: 5 (2022)
- Source: Cricinfo, 11 February 2018

Lauritz Haccou (born 24 April 1994) is a Namibian cricketer. He made his List A debut for Namibia in the 2017–18 CSA Provincial One-Day Challenge on 11 February 2018. He is also an umpire, and stood in matches during the 2022 Capricorn Women's Tri-Series.
