= Claudine Beckford =

American cricketer (born 1988)

Personal information
- Full name: Claudine Beckford
- Born: 10 October 1988 (age 38); St. Thomas, Jamaica
- Nickname: Becky
- Batting: Right-handed
- Bowling: Right-arm off break
- Role: All-rounder

International information
- National side: United States
- T20I debut (cap 1): 17 May 2019 v Canada
- Last T20I: 5 September 2019 v Netherlands

Career statistics
Competition	WT20I
Matches	6
Runs scored	0
Batting average	0.00
100s/50s	0/0
Top score	0
Balls bowled	108
Wickets	6
Bowling average	14.00
5 wickets in innings	0
10 wickets in match	0
Best bowling	3/26
Catches/stumpings	0/–
- Source: Cricinfo, 4 May 2021

Claudine Beckford (born 10 October 1988) is a Jamaican-born American cricketer. She made her international debut at the 2011 Women's Cricket World Cup Qualifier representing the United States. Beckford also played domestic cricket matches for Jamaica before moving to the United States. In March 2019, she was named in the United States team for the 2019 ICC Women's Qualifier Americas tournament against Canada. She made her WT20I debut for the United States against Canada in the Americas Qualifier on 17 May 2019.

In August 2019, she was named in the American squad for the 2019 ICC Women's World Twenty20 Qualifier tournament in Scotland. She played in the United States' opening match of the tournament, on 31 August 2019, against Scotland.

In February 2021, she was named in the Women's National Training Group by the USA Cricket Women's National Selectors ahead of the 2021 Women's Cricket World Cup Qualifier and the 2021 ICC Women's T20 World Cup Americas Qualifier tournaments.
