= 2021 Kwibuka Women's T20 Tournament =

International cricket tournament

- Dates: 6 – 12 June 2021
- Administrator: Rwanda Cricket Association
- Cricket format: Women's Twenty20 International
- Tournament format(s): Round-robin and play-offs
- Host: Rwanda
- Champions: Kenya (4th title)
- Runners-up: Namibia
- Participants: 5
- Matches: 14
- Player of the series: (Kenya) Queentor Abel
- Most runs: (Namibia) Sune Wittmann (167)
- Most wickets: (Kenya) Sarah Wetoto (17)

The 2021 Kwibuka Women's T20 Tournament was a women's T20I cricket (WT20I) tournament held in Rwanda from 6 to 12 June 2021. This was the seventh edition of the annual Kwibuka T20 Tournament, first organised in 2014 in remembrance of the victims of the 1994 genocide against the Tutsi. All matches were played at the Gahanga International Cricket Stadium in Kigali. Tanzania won the 2019 edition but did not defend the title this year. The 2020 edition of the tournament was cancelled due to the COVID-19 pandemic.

The 2021 edition of the tournament was originally announced as a five-team event featuring the women's national sides of Rwanda, Botswana, Namibia, Nigeria and two-time champions Uganda. On 29 May 2021, it was confirmed that three-time champions Kenya would also participate. Botswana, Namibia and Nigeria played in the Kwibuka tournament for the first time. The six teams were placed into two groups of three. However, Uganda withdrew from the tournament on 3 June 2021 due to positive COVID-19 tests within their camp. Prior to their withdrawal, Uganda had named a provisional squad for the tournament.

The Rwanda Cricket Association stated their intent to further enhance the status of the Kwibuka tournament by including Zimbabwe on a regular basis in future years and inviting leading associate teams from Europe and elsewhere, stating that they had already held positive talks with the German Cricket Federation and the Brazilian Cricket Association.

Namibia won all four of their round-robin matches to become the first team to qualify for the semi-finals. Hosts Rwanda beat Nigeria in their penultimate group match to confirm their berth in the semi-finals. Kenya also secured a place in the semi-finals. In the final group game, Nigeria beat Botswana by three wickets to become the fourth and final team to qualify for the semi-finals. Namibia and Kenya advanced to the final with comfortable semi-final victories over Nigeria and Rwanda, respectively.

Rwanda finished the tournament in third place, after beating Nigeria by eight runs in the play-off match. Kenya won their fourth Kwibuka T20 title after defeating Namibia by 7 wickets in the final. Kenyan all-rounder Queentor Abel was named player of the tournament, after scoring 165 runs and taking 7 wickets.

== Squads ==
The following squads were named for the tournament:

Botswana	Kenya	Namibia	Nigeria	Rwanda
Laura Mophakedi (c, wk); Florence Samanyika (vc); Tebagano Ditshotlo; Botho Freeman; Onneile Keitsemang; Jacqueline Kgang; Bontle Madimabe; Precious Modimo; Thapelo Modise; Amantle Mokgotlhe; Collin Mokibelo; Shameelah Mosweu; Tebogo Motlhabaphuti; Botsogo Mpedi; Tuelo Shadrack	Margaret Ngoche (c); Sarah Wetoto (vc); Queentor Abel; Josephine Abwom; Veronica Abuga; Ruth Achando (wk); Lavendah Idambo; Sharon Juma (wk); Melvin Khagoitsa; Brenda Mogusu; Monicah Ndhambi; Daisy Njoroge; Flavia Odhiambo; Marion Okira; Jane Otieno; Esther Wachira; Edith Waithaka	Irene van Zyl (c); Yasmeen Khan (vc, wk); Jurriene Diergaardt; Dietlind Foerster; Merczerly Gorases; Kayleen Green; Victoria Hamunyela; Reehana Khan; Wilka Mwatile; Sylvia Shihepo; Namusha Shiomwenyo; Adri van der Merwe; Edelle van Zyl; Sune Wittmann	Samantha Agazuma (c); Agatha Obulor (vc); Kehinde Abdulquadri; Omonye Asika; Mary Desmond; Joy Efosa; Favour Eseigbe; Blessing Etim; Abigail Igbobie (wk); Miracle Imimole; Piety Lucky; Blessing Nwobodo; Osyende Omonkhobio; Racheal Samson; Esther Sandy; Salome Sunday	Sarah Uwera (c, wk); Marie Bimenyimana; Diane Dusabemungu; Alice Ikuzwe; Flora Irakoze (wk); Sifa Ingabire; Gisele Ishimwe; Henriette Ishimwe; Immaculee Muhawenimana; Delphine Mukarurangwa; Belise Murekatete; Josiane Nyirankundineza; Cathia Uwamahoro; Margueritte Vumiliya

== Round-robin ==
=== Points table ===
Teams	P	W	L	T	NR	Pts	NRR
Namibia	4	4	0	0	0	8	+2.662
Kenya	4	3	1	0	0	6	+0.957
Rwanda	4	2	2	0	0	4	+0.095
Nigeria	4	1	3	0	0	2	–0.993
Botswana	4	0	4	0	0	0	–3.249

=== Matches ===
6 June 2021
09:30
Scorecard

Botswana; 29 (10.1 overs)	v	Rwanda; 31/2 (5.2 overs)
Botsogo Mpedi 5 (11); Alice Ikuzwe 3/5 (3 overs)		Sarah Uwera 10* (12); Amantle Mokgotlhe 1/8 (2 overs)

Rwanda won by 8 wickets
Gahanga International Cricket Stadium, Kigali
Umpires: Eric Dusabemungu (Rwa) and Habib Enesi (Ngr)
Player of the match: Alice Ikuzwe (Rwa)

- Rwanda won the toss and elected to field.
- Belise Murekatete (Rwa), Jacqueline Kgang and Tebogo Motlhabaphuti (Bot) all made their WT20I debuts.

6 June 2021
13:50
Scorecard

Nigeria; 52/8 (20 overs)	v	Namibia; 56/2 (9.1 overs)
Joy Efosa 7* (22); Victoria Hamunyela 4/8 (4 overs)		Jurriene Diergaardt 26* (27); Joy Efosa 2/17 (3 overs)

Namibia won by 8 wickets
Gahanga International Cricket Stadium, Kigali
Umpires: Itangishaka Oliver (Rwa) and Vicky Prajapati (Rwa)
Player of the match: Victoria Hamunyela (Nam)

- Nigeria won the toss and elected to bat.

7 June 2021
09:30
Scorecard

Botswana; 68/9 (20 overs)	v	Kenya; 71/1 (7.3 overs)
Florence Samanyika 18 (31); Sarah Wetoto 5/12 (4 overs)		Queentor Abel 35* (19); Onneile Keitsemang 1/21 (2 overs)

Kenya won by 9 wickets
Gahanga International Cricket Stadium, Kigali
Umpires: Eric Dusabemungu (Rwa) and Jackson Nzayisenga (Rwa)
Player of the match: Sarah Wetoto (Ken)

- Kenya won the toss and elected to field.
- Melvin Khagoitsa and Jane Otieno (Ken) both made their WT20I debuts.
- Sarah Wetoto (Ken) took her first five-wicket haul in WT20Is.

7 June 2021
13:50
Scorecard

Namibia; 101/6 (20 overs)	v	Rwanda; 58/8 (20 overs)
Adri van der Merwe 29 (23); Sifa Ingabire 3/10 (3 overs)		Henriette Ishimwe 12 (26); Wilka Mwatile 2/7 (4 overs)

Namibia won by 43 runs
Gahanga International Cricket Stadium, Kigali
Umpires: Habib Enesi (Ngr) and Vicky Prajapati (Rwa)
Player of the match: Kayleen Green (Nam)

- Rwanda won the toss and elected to field.

8 June 2021
09:30
Scorecard

Nigeria; 108/5 (20 overs)	v	Kenya; 109/2 (18.1 overs)
Blessing Etim 34 (33); Margaret Ngoche 2/27 (4 overs)		Queentor Abel 40 (53); Favour Eseigbe 1/19 (4 overs)

Kenya won by 8 wickets
Gahanga International Cricket Stadium, Kigali
Umpires: Itangishaka Oliver (Rwa) and Jackson Nzayisenga (Rwa)
Player of the match: Queentor Abel (Ken)

- Nigeria won the toss and elected to bat.
- Ruth Achando (Ken) made her WT20I debut.

8 June 2021
13:50
Scorecard

Namibia; 155/1 (20 overs)	v	Botswana; 90/7 (20 overs)
Sune Wittmann 93* (60)		Shameelah Mosweu 29 (22); Victoria Hamunyela 2/11 (4 overs)

Namibia won by 65 runs
Gahanga International Cricket Stadium, Kigali
Umpires: Eric Dusabemungu (Rwa) and Vicky Prajapati (Rwa)
Player of the match: Sune Wittmann (Nam)

- Namibia won the toss and elected to bat.
- Collin Mokibelo (Bot) and Merczerly Gorases (Nam) both made their WT20I debuts.

9 June 2021
09:30
Scorecard

Namibia; 110/6 (20 overs)	v	Kenya; 74 (14.2 overs)
Sune Wittmann 39 (26); Sarah Wetoto 3/13 (4 overs)		Queentor Abel 19 (17); Victoria Hamunyela 4/15 (4 overs)

Namibia won by 36 runs
Gahanga International Cricket Stadium, Kigali
Umpires: Habib Enesi (Ngr) and Vicky Prajapati (Rwa)
Player of the match: Victoria Hamunyela (Nam)

- Kenya won the toss and elected to field.

9 June 2021
13:50
Scorecard

Rwanda; 108/7 (20 overs)	v	Nigeria; 102/8 (20 overs)
Henriette Ishimwe 24 (23); Blessing Etim 2/28 (4 overs)		Salome Sunday 17 (17); Henriette Ishimwe 2/5 (3 overs)

Rwanda won by 6 runs
Gahanga International Cricket Stadium, Kigali
Umpires: Jackson Nzayisenga (Rwa) and Itangishaka Oliver (Rwa)
Player of the match: Henriette Ishimwe (Rwa)

- Nigeria won the toss and elected to field.
- Miracle Imimole (Ngr) made her WT20I debut.

10 June 2021
09:30
Scorecard

Kenya; 129/3 (20 overs)	v	Rwanda; 104/7 (20 overs)
Queentor Abel 47* (55); Henriette Ishimwe 3/22 (4 overs)		Marie Bimenyimana 31 (37); Lavendah Idambo 2/17 (3 overs)

Kenya won by 25 runs
Gahanga International Cricket Stadium, Kigali
Umpires: Habib Enesi (Ngr) and Itangishaka Oliver (Rwa)
Player of the match: Queentor Abel (Ken)

- Kenya won the toss and elected to bat.

10 June 2021
13:50
Scorecard

Botswana; 106/8 (20 overs)	v	Nigeria; 107/7 (19.5 overs)
Amantle Mokgotlhe 36* (28); Mary Desmond 2/13 (4 overs)		Samantha Agazuma 23 (29); Jacqueline Kgang 3/18 (4 overs)

Nigeria won by 3 wickets
Gahanga International Cricket Stadium, Kigali
Umpires: Eric Dusabemungu (Rwa) and Jackson Nzayisenga (Rwa)
Player of the match: Blessing Etim (Ngr)

- Nigeria won the toss and elected to field.

== Play-offs ==
=== Semi-finals ===
11 June 2021
09:30
Scorecard

Namibia; 156/2 (20 overs)	v	Nigeria; 65/8 (20 overs)
Yasmeen Khan 78* (53); Mary Desmond 1/20 (4 overs)		Esther Sandy 13 (17); Sylvia Shihepo 2/12 (4 overs)

Namibia won by 91 runs
Gahanga International Cricket Stadium, Kigali
Umpires: Eric Dusabemungu (Rwa) and Habib Enesi (Ngr)
Player of the match: Yasmeen Khan (Nam)

- Namibia won the toss and elected to bat.

11 June 2021
13:50
Scorecard

Kenya; 117/6 (20 overs)	v	Rwanda; 65 (16.5 overs)
Margaret Ngoche 38 (46); Margueritte Vumiliya 2/15 (4 overs)		Delphine Mukarurangwa 16 (30); Sarah Wetoto 2/5 (2.5 overs)

Kenya won by 52 runs
Gahanga International Cricket Stadium, Kigali
Umpires: Itangishaka Oliver (Rwa) and Vicky Prajapati (Rwa)
Player of the match: Sarah Wetoto (Ken)

- Kenya won the toss and elected to bat.

=== Third-place play-off ===
12 June 2021
09:30
Scorecard

Rwanda; 112/5 (20 overs)	v	Nigeria; 104/6 (20 overs)
Gisele Ishimwe 39 (40); Rachael Samson 1/14 (3 overs)		Kehinde Abdulquadri 31 (50); Marie Bimenyimana 2/21 (4 overs)

Rwanda won by 8 runs
Gahanga International Cricket Stadium, Kigali
Umpires: Eric Dusabemungu (Rwa) and Jackson Nzayisenga (Rwa)
Player of the match: Marie Bimenyimana (Rwa)

- Rwanda won the toss and elected to bat.
- Oseyende Omonkhobio (Ngr) made her WT20I debut.

=== Final ===
12 June 2021
13:50
Scorecard

Namibia; 69 (15.5 overs)	v	Kenya; 72/3 (11 overs)
Sylvia Shihepo 16* (21); Sarah Wetoto 6/16 (3.5 overs)		Margaret Ngoche 37* (30); Victoria Hamunyela 1/4 (1 over)

Kenya won by 7 wickets
Gahanga International Cricket Stadium, Kigali
Umpires: Habib Enesi (Ngr) and Vicky Prajapati (Rwa)
Player of the match: Sarah Wetoto (Ken)

- Namibia won the toss and elected to bat.

== Team of the tournament ==
The following 14 players were named in the team of the tournament:

- (Namibia) Sune Wittmann
- (Kenya) Queentor Abel
- (Namibia) Yasmeen Khan (wk)
- (Kenya) Sarah Wetoto
- (Namibia) Adri van der Merwe
- (Kenya) Margaret Ngoche (c)
- (Namibia) Kayleen Green
- (Botswana) Amantle Mokgotlhe
- (Nigeria) Blessing Etim
- (Rwanda) Henriette Ishimwe
- (Namibia) Victoria Hamunyela
- (Rwanda) Cathia Uwamahoro
- (Nigeria) Salome Sunday
- (Rwanda) Marie Bimenyimana
