= List of Namibia women Twenty20 International cricketers =

This is a list of Namibia women Twenty20 International cricketers. A Twenty20 International (T20I) is an international cricket match between two representative teams. A T20I is played under the rules of Twenty20 cricket. In April 2018, the International Cricket Council (ICC) granted full international status to Twenty20 women's matches played between member sides from 1 July 2018 onwards.

The list is arranged in the order in which each player won her first Twenty20 cap. Where more than one player won her first Twenty20 cap in the same match, those players are listed alphabetically by surname.

== Key ==
General

- † – Wicket-keeper
- First – Year of debut
- Last – Year of latest game
- Mat – Number of matches played

Batting

- Runs – Runs scored in career
- HS – Highest score
- Avg – Average runs scored per dismissal
- 50 – Number of half centuries
- * – Batsman remained not out

Bowling

- Balls – Balls bowled in career
- Wkt – Wickets taken in career
- BBI – Best bowling in an innings
- Ave – Average runs conceded per wicket

Fielding

- Ca – Catches taken
- St – Stumpings taken

== Players ==
Statistics are correct as of 14 November 2026.

General					Batting				Bowling				Fielding		Ref
No.	Name	First	Last	Mat	Runs	HS	Avg	50	Balls	Wkt	BBI	Ave	Ca	St	Ref
1	Jurriene Diergaardt	2018	2026	122	1,036	62*	12.95	1	1,441	66	5/21	20.19	23	0	
2	Dietlind Foerster	2018	2024	55	142	19*	11.83	0	432	18	2/9	19.33	25	0	
3	Kayleen Green†	2018	2026	123	1,477	86*	16.97	3	1,801	88	3/8	15.44	29	4	
4	Victoria Hamunyela	2018	2026	83	69	14	6.90	0	1,402	73	4/8	15.15	14	0	
5	Wilka Mwatile	2018	2026	117	1,059	54*	13.75	1	2,266	99	5/6	16.81	38	0	
6	Reehana Khan	2018	2021	23	46	17*	6.57	0	136	9	2/6	14.55	2	0	
7	Sylvia Shihepo	2018	2026	113	329	25*	8.43	0	968	57	3/6	15.00	30	0	
8	Namusha Shiomwenyo	2018	2022	11	3	3	3.00	0	196	7	3/6	19.28	1	0	
9	Ester Simeon†	2018	2018	6	0	0	0.00	0	–	–	–	–	5	2	
10	Adri van der Merwe	2018	2023	59	967	57	20.14	2	–	–	–	–	19	0	
11	Yasmeen Khan‡†	2018	2026	117	2,052	78*	21.60	9	168	9	4/20	15.11	47	4	
12	Constancia Kauripeke	2018	2019	4	0	0	0.00	0	54	1	1/0	33.00	0	0	
13	Eveleen Kejarukua	2018	2026	43	53	10	4.81	0	1,042	43	3/2	18.90	6	0	
14	Edelle van Zyl	2018	2026	71	375	27*	7.21	0	–	–	–	–	6	0	
15	Roche Venter	2019	2019	5	40	15	8.00	0	6	0	–	–	1	0	
16	Sune Wittmann‡	2019	2026	115	2,015	93*	19.37	12	1,049	53	5/10	16.32	43	0	
17	Maryke Short	2019	2019	9	44	36	11.00	0	192	13	4/14	9.53	2	0	
18	Irene van Zyl‡	2019	2024	67	270	23	10.38	0	1,168	47	4/7	19.25	11	0	
19	Mikala Bosman†	2019	2019	4	2	2	2.00	0	–	–	–	–	1	0	
20	Anneri van Schoor	2019	2019	1	39	39*	–	0	–	–	–	–	0	0	
21	Petro Enright	2019	2019	4	42	20	10.50	0	21	0	–	–	0	0	
22	Merczerly Gorases†	2021	2026	97	628	45	11.21	0	60	4	2/18	18.75	31	12	
23	Kaylee van Wyk	2021	2021	1	1	1	1.00	0	–	–	–	–	0	0	
24	Mekelaye Mwatile	2021	2026	74	667	60*	14.19	1	843	52	3/10	15.26	25	0	
25	Bianca Manuel	2023	2025	22	68	20	4.53	0	–	–	–	–	1	0	
26	Naomi Benjamin	2023	2026	40	134	20*	9.57	0	304	15	3/9	17.40	10	0	
27	Saima Tuhadeleni	2023	2026	40	12	6*	12.00	0	786	43	3/12	15.30	8	0	
28	Leigh-Marie Visser	2025	2025	5	3	3	3.00	0	60	5	3/10	14.20	1	0	
