= Adri van der Merwe =

Namibian cricketer (born 2002)

Personal information
- Full name: Adri van der Merwe
- Born: 6 June 2002 (age 24); Swakopmund, Namibia
- Batting: Right-handed
- Bowling: Right-arm medium
- Role: Opening batsmen

International information
- National side: Namibia
- T20I debut (cap 10): 20 August 2018 v Malawi
- Last T20I: 2 May 2023 v Uganda

Career statistics
Competition	WT20I
Matches	59
Runs scored	967
Batting average	20.14
100s/50s	0/2
Top score	57
Catches/stumpings	19/–
- Source: Cricinfo, 8 October 2024

Adri van der Merwe (born 6 June 2002) is a Namibian cricketer. She made her Women's Twenty20 International (WT20I) debut for the Namibia women's cricket team on 20 August 2018, against Malawi, in the 2018 Botswana Cricket Association Women's T20I Series. It was the first WT20I match to be played by Namibia.

In August 2019, she was named in Namibia's squad for the 2019 ICC Women's World Twenty20 Qualifier tournament in Scotland. She played in Namibia's opening match of the tournament, on 31 August 2019, against Ireland. In May 2021, she was named in Namibia's squad for the 2021 Kwibuka Women's T20 Tournament in Rwanda. Following the conclusion of the tournament, she was named in the team of the tournament, selected by the Rwanda Cricket Association.
