= Sune Wittmann =

Namibian cricketer

Personal information
- Full name: Sune Alet Wittmann
- Born: 3 February 1995 (age 31); Windhoek, Namibia
- Batting: Right-handed
- Bowling: Right-arm medium
- Role: All-rounder

International information
- National side: Namibia
- T20I debut (cap 16): 5 January 2019 v Zimbabwe
- Last T20I: 14 September 2024 v Zimbabwe

Domestic team information
- Years: Team
- 2021/22: North West

Career statistics
Competition	WT20I
Matches	62
Runs scored	1,036
Batting average	19.18
100s/50s	0/6
Top score	93*
Balls bowled	750
Wickets	39
Bowling average	14.92
5 wickets in innings	1
10 wickets in match	0
Best bowling	5/10
Catches/stumpings	17/–
- Source: Cricinfo, 7 October 2024

Sune Alet Wittmann (born 3 February 1995) is a Namibian cricketer. She made her Women's Twenty20 International (WT20I) debut for the Namibia women's cricket team on 5 January 2019, against Zimbabwe, during Zimbabwe's tour of Namibia.

In August 2019, she was named in Namibia's squad for the 2019 ICC Women's World Twenty20 Qualifier tournament in Scotland. She played in Namibia's opening match of the tournament, on 31 August 2019, against Ireland. In May 2021, she was named in Namibia's squad for the 2021 Kwibuka Women's T20 Tournament in Rwanda. In Namibia's third match of the tournament, against Botswana, Wittmann scored a match-winning 93 not out from 60 balls. Following the conclusion of the tournament, Wittmann was named in the team of the tournament, selected by the Rwanda Cricket Association.

In April 2022, Wittmann was named in Namibia's squad for the 2022 Capricorn Women's Tri-Series. On 23 April 2022, in Namibia's match against Uganda, Wittmann took her first five-wicket haul in a WT20I match, with five wickets for ten runs.
