= Wilka Mwatile =

Namibian cricketer

Personal information
- Full name: Wilka Mwatile
- Born: 18 July 2000 (age 26); Eshakeno, Ohangwena, Namibia
- Batting: Right-handed
- Bowling: Right-arm offbreak

International information
- National side: Namibia
- T20I debut (cap 5): 20 August 2018 v Malawi
- Last T20I: 14 September 2024 v Zimbabwe

Career statistics
Competition	WT20I
Matches	64
Runs scored	503
Batting average	11.97
100s/50s	0/0
Top score	33
Balls bowled	1,146
Wickets	55
Bowling average	15.67
5 wickets in innings	1
10 wickets in match	0
Best bowling	5/6
Catches/stumpings	23/–
- Source: Cricinfo, 7 October 2024

Wilka Mwatile (born 18 July 2000) is a Namibian cricketer. She made her Women's Twenty20 International (WT20I) debut for the Namibia women's cricket team on 20 August 2018, against Malawi, in the 2018 Botswana Cricket Association Women's T20I Series. It was the first WT20I match to be played by Namibia.

In August 2019, she was named in Namibia's squad for the 2019 ICC Women's World Twenty20 Qualifier tournament in Scotland. She played in Namibia's opening match of the tournament, on 31 August 2019, against Ireland. She was the leading wicket-taker for Namibia in the tournament, with five dismissals in five matches. In May 2021, she was named in Namibia's squad for the 2021 Kwibuka Women's T20 Tournament in Rwanda.

In September 2021, in the 2021 ICC Women's T20 World Cup Africa Qualifier match against Cameroon, Mwatile took a five-wicket haul.
