= Dietlind Foerster =

Namibian cricketer (born 1981)

Personal information
- Full name: Dietlind Foerster
- Born: 18 March 1981 (age 45)
- Batting: Right-handed
- Bowling: Right-arm medium

International information
- National side: Namibia
- T20I debut (cap 2): 20 August 2018 v Malawi
- Last T20I: 10 March 2024 v Tanzania

Career statistics
Competition	WT20I
Matches	55
Runs scored	142
Batting average	11.83
100s/50s	0/0
Top score	19*
Balls bowled	432
Wickets	18
Bowling average	19.33
5 wickets in innings	0
10 wickets in match	0
Best bowling	2/9
Catches/stumpings	25/–
- Source: Cricinfo, 8 October 2024

Dietlind Foerster (born 18 March 1981) is a Namibian cricketer. Her fielding position is Wicket Keeper, her batting style is the Right hand Bat, while her bowling style is Right hand Medium. She made her Women's Twenty20 International (WT20I) debut for the Namibia women's cricket team on 20 August 2018, against Malawi, in the 2018 Botswana Cricket Association Women's T20I Series. It was the first WT20I match to be played by Namibia.

In August 2019, she was named in Namibia's squad for the 2019 ICC Women's World Twenty20 Qualifier tournament in Scotland. She played in Namibia's opening match of the tournament on 31 August 2019 against Ireland. In May 2021, she was named in Namibia's squad for the 2021 Kwibuka Women's T20 Tournament in Rwanda.
