= 2019 Women's T20 World Cup Qualifier =

Cricket tournament

2019 ICC Women's T20 World Cup Qualifier
- Dates: 31 August – 7 September 2019
- Administrator: International Cricket Council
- Cricket format: WT20I
- Tournament format(s): Group stages, playoffs
- Host: Scotland
- Champions: Bangladesh (2nd title)
- Runners-up: Thailand
- Participants: 8
- Matches: 20
- Player of the series: (Thailand) Chanida Sutthiruang
- Most runs: (Scotland) Kathryn Bryce (168)
- Most wickets: (Thailand) Chanida Sutthiruang (12)

The 2019 ICC Women's T20 World Cup Qualifier was an international women's cricket tournament that was held in August and September 2019 in Scotland. It was the fourth edition of the Women's T20 World Cup Qualifier and was the qualification tournament for the 2020 ICC Women's T20 World Cup tournament. Both finalists from the qualifier tournament progressed to the 2020 ICC Women's T20 World Cup in Australia. In June 2019, Cricket Scotland confirmed the tournament dates, format and venues. The full schedule was confirmed on 8 August 2019.

In July 2019, the International Cricket Council (ICC) suspended Zimbabwe Cricket, with the team barred from taking part in ICC events, which put their participation in the tournament in doubt. The following month, with Zimbabwe banned from taking part in international cricket tournaments, the ICC confirmed that Namibia would replace them in the tournament.

Bangladesh were the first team to qualify for the Women's T20 World Cup, after they beat Ireland by four wickets in their semi-final match. Thailand qualified for their first Women's T20 Would Cup in the other semi-final, defeating Papua New Guinea by eight wickets. The final was played at Forthill, and saw Bangladesh claim their second title, beating Thailand by 70 runs in the final.

== Qualification ==
Eight teams took part in the qualifier for the 2020 ICC Women's T20 World Cup. The first teams to qualify were Bangladesh and Ireland, who finished bottom of the group at the 2018 ICC Women's World Twenty20 tournament. Twenty-six teams entered qualifying for the remaining five places, with Scotland gaining the hosting rights in March 2019. In Asia, Thailand defeated the United Arab Emirates on the final match day to finish with a perfect record to book their place into the qualifier.

In May 2019, qualification tournaments were held in Africa, East-Asia and Pacific and the Americas. Zimbabwe, Papua New Guinea, and the United States all won their respective groups to advance to the qualifier. The final qualifying tournament was in Europe, which saw the Netherlands become the final team to reach the qualifier, as they finished ahead of Scotland on net run rate. On 7 August 2019, Zimbabwe was removed from the competition and replaced by Namibia due to their suspension from the ICC.

Means of Qualification	Date	Host	Berths	Qualified
Automatic Qualifications
2018 World T20	November 2018	Tournament results	2	Bangladesh; Ireland
Host			1	Scotland
Regional Qualifications
Asia	18–27 February 2019	Thailand	1	Thailand
Africa	5–12 May 2019	Zimbabwe	1	~~Zimbabwe~~; Namibia
East Asia-Pacific	6–10 May 2019	Vanuatu	1	Papua New Guinea
Americas	17–19 May 2019	United States	1	United States
Europe	26–29 June 2019	Spain	1	Netherlands
Total			8	

== Squads ==
On 21 August 2019, the ICC confirmed all the squads and match officials for the tournament. The ICC appointed an all-female umpire panel, the first time this had happened at an ICC event.

Bangladesh	Ireland	Namibia	Netherlands
Salma Khatun (c); Jahanara Alam; Nahida Akter; Fargana Hoque; Sanjida Islam; Fahima Khatun; Murshida Khatun; Khadija Tul Kubra; Sobhana Mostary; Ritu Moni; Ayasha Rahman; Shaila Sharmin; Nigar Sultana; Shamima Sultana (wk)	Laura Delany (c); Kim Garth; Shauna Kavanagh; Gaby Lewis; Louise Little; Sophie MacMahon; Lara Maritz; Leah Paul; Orla Prendergast; Celeste Raack; Una Raymond-Hoey; Eimear Richardson; Rebecca Stokell; Mary Waldron	Yasmeen Khan (c); Jurriene Diergaardt; Petro Enright; Dietlind Foerster; Merczerly Gorases; Kayleen Green; Victoria Hamunyela; Eveleen Kejarukua; Reehana Khan; Wilka Mwatile; Sylvia Shihepo; Adri van der Merwe; Irene van Zyl; Sune Wittmann	Juliët Post (c); Leonie Bennett; Denise van Deventer; Sterre Kalis; Hannah Landheer; Caroline de Lange; Babette de Leede; Eva Lynch; Frederique Overdijk; Robine Rijke; Heather Siegers; Silver Siegers; Miranda Veringmeier; Iris Zwilling
Papua New Guinea	Scotland	Thailand	United States
Kaia Arua (c); Ravina Oa (vc); Tanya Ruma (vc); Natasha Ambo; Vicky Araa; Gari Buruka; Veru Frank; Nerela Ila; Sibona Jimmy; Konio Oala; Brenda Tau; Isabel Toua; Mairi Tom; Naoani Vare	Kathryn Bryce (c); Sarah Bryce; Abbi Aitken; Priyanaz Chatterji; Katherine Fraser; Becky Glen; Rachel Hawkins; Lorna Jack; Abtaha Maqsood; Megan McColl; Katie McGill; Hannah Rainey; Ellen Watson; Ruth Willis	Sornnarin Tippoch (c); Nattaya Boochatham; Naruemol Chaiwai; Natthakan Chantam; Onnicha Kamchomphu; Rosenan Kanoh; Nannapat Koncharoenkai; Suleeporn Laomi; Soraya Lateh; Wongpaka Liengprasert; Phannita Maya; Ratanaporn Padunglerd; Chanida Sutthiruang; Arriya Yenyueak	Sindhu Sriharsha (c); Claudine Beckford; Shebani Bhaskar; Sugetha Chandhrasekar; Sara Farooq; Nadia Gruny; Uzma Iftikhar; Mahika Kandanala; Geetika Kodali; Samantha Ramautar; Lisa Ramjit; Akshatha Rao; Erica Rendler; Onika Wallerson

== Warm-up matches ==
Before the tournament, the eight teams took part in four warm-up matches which took place on 29 August 2019. These matches did not have WT20I status, as teams were allowed to field all fourteen members of their squad.

Warm-up matches

29 August 2019
10:00
Scorecard

Ireland; 147/6 (20 overs)	v	Papua New Guinea; 77/7 (20 overs)
Kim Garth 57 (35); Natasha Ambo 1/13 (2 overs)		Brenda Tau 20 (38); Eimear Richardson 2/13 (4 overs)

Ireland Women won by 70 runs
Forthill, Dundee
Umpires: Claire Polosak (Aus) and Jacqueline Williams (WI)

- Ireland Women won the toss and elected to bat.

29 August 2019
10:00
Scorecard

Netherlands; 51 (16.5 overs)	v	Bangladesh; 53/0 (6.3 overs)
Sterre Kalis 19 (40); Shaila Sharmin 2/2 (1 over)		Sanjida Islam 24* (27)

Bangladesh Women won by 10 wickets
Lochlands Park, Arbroath
Umpires: Kim Cotton (NZ) and Sue Redfern (Eng)

- Netherlands Women won the toss and elected to bat.

29 August 2019
14:00
Scorecard

Scotland; 170/3 (20 overs)	v	Namibia; 86/7 (20 overs)
Lorna Jack 58 (47); Kayleen Green 3/26 (4 overs)		Dietlind Foerster 27 (20); Abtaha Maqsood 2/5 (4 overs)

Scotland Women won by 84 runs
Forthill, Dundee
Umpires: Lauren Agenbag (SA) and Jacqueline Williams (WI)

- Namibia Women won the toss and elected to field.

29 August 2019
14:00
Scorecard

Thailand; 124/4 (20 overs)	v	United States; 66/7 (20 overs)
Naruemol Chaiwai 54 (59); Samantha Ramautar 1/16 (3 overs)		Nadia Gruny 22 (29); Onnicha Kamchomphu 3/9 (4 overs)

Thailand Women won by 58 runs
Lochlands Park, Arbroath
Umpires: Kim Cotton (NZ) and Eloise Sheridan (Aus)

- Thailand Women won the toss and elected to bat.

== Group stage ==
The first round of matches saw rain affect all four of the matches that were scheduled to be played, with the game between Bangladesh and Papua New Guinea abandoned and moved to the reserve day. The other match in Group A was reduced to seven overs per side, with Kathryn Bryce taking two wickets and scoring 29 not out, as she led Scotland to a 30-run victory over the United States at Forthill. In Group B, Thailand opened their campaign with a 30-run victory over the Netherlands at Lochlands. Natthakan Chantam top-scored with 44, with Thailand scoring 76 runs from their nine overs, with the Netherlands only making 46 runs in reply. The final match of the opening day saw Ireland recording a seven wicket victory over Namibia, after Namibia made 83/9 from their twenty overs, with Eimear Richardson taking two wickets for ten runs. Ireland chased down the target in 15 overs with Mary Waldron top scoring with 33.

The second day of matches saw the first shock of the tournament, with Papua New Guinea beating hosts Scotland by six wickets in Group A. Scotland's captain, Kathryn Bryce, admitted that her side was below par at the halfway point, and that the team gave away too many runs. In the other match in Group A, Bangladesh easily beat the United States, after the United States were bowled out for 46 runs, with Bangladesh winning by eight wickets. In Group B, Namibia started strongly against Thailand, with Sylvia Shihepo taking three wickets for eight runs, as Thailand were restricted to 99/6 in their 20 overs. However, Namibia were bowled out for 61 runs, with Chanida Sutthiruang taking three wickets for ten runs, with Thailand winning by 38 runs. In the day's final game, Ireland beat the Netherlands by 19 runs, despite a fightback from the Dutch side, after Ireland posted 120 runs in their innings. The wins for Thailand and Ireland guaranteed both sides a semi-final place. In the rescheduled match between Bangladesh and Papua New Guinea, Bangladesh won a close game by six runs, via the DLS method.

The final day of matches started in Group B with Thailand finishing top of the group with a two-run victory over Ireland. After Leah Paul took three wickets in the Thailand innings, Ireland made a poor start in their run chase. Ireland's captain, Laura Delany, said that they struggled with partnerships and was left with too much to get, as they lost four wickets in four overs, with Thailand winning the match. The other match in Group B saw the Netherlands record their first victory of the tournament, with a six wicket win. Iris Zwilling and Heather Siegers each took three wickets to restrict Namibia to 91 for 8 from their twenty overs. In response, Sterre Kalis top scored for the Netherlands, as they chased down the target with 17 balls to spare. In Group A, Bangladesh beat Scotland by 13 runs in a rain-affected match. Scotland suffered a collapse in their run chase, losing four quick wickets, including three run outs, to end their chances of progressing to the Women's T20 World Cup. Papua New Guinea beat the United States by 22 runs in another match impacted by the weather. Sibona Jimmy scored an unbeaten half-century and took three wickets, in a player of the match performance, to help Papua New Guinea secure their second win of the tournament. Therefore, Bangladesh and Papua New Guinea advanced to the semi-finals with wins in their final group matches.

=== Group A ===
Pos	Team	Pld	W	L	T	NR	Pts	NRR
1	Bangladesh	3	3	0	0	0	6	2.821
2	Papua New Guinea	3	2	1	0	0	4	0.445
3	Scotland	3	1	2	0	0	2	0.377
4	United States	3	0	3	0	0	0	−3.064

31 August 2019
14:00
Scorecard

Scotland; 60/3 (7 overs)	v	United States; 30/5 (7 overs)
Kathryn Bryce 29* (20); Claudine Beckford 3/26 (2 overs)		Sindhu Sriharsha 10 (14); Kathryn Bryce 2/6 (2 overs)

Scotland Women won by 30 runs
Forthill, Dundee
Umpires: Kim Cotton (NZ) and Sue Redfern (Eng)
Player of the match: Kathryn Bryce (Sco)

- Scotland Women won the toss and elected to bat.
- The match was reduced to 7 overs per side due to rain.
- Akshatha Rao (USA) made her WT20I debut.

1 September 2019
10:00
Scorecard

Scotland; 101/5 (20 overs)	v	Papua New Guinea; 102/4 (19.3 overs)
Kathryn Bryce 45 (50); Sibona Jimmy 2/16 (4 overs)		Brenda Tau 30 (31); Kathryn Bryce 1/6 (3 overs)

Papua New Guinea Women won by 6 wickets
Lochlands Park, Arbroath
Umpires: Lauren Agenbag (SA) and Kim Cotton (NZ)
Player of the match: Brenda Tau (PNG)

- Papua New Guinea Women won the toss and elected to field.
- Konio Oala (PNG) made her WT20I debut.

1 September 2019
14:00
Scorecard

United States; 46 (19.5 overs)	v	Bangladesh; 48/2 (8.2 overs)
Sugetha Chandhrasekar 15 (37); Nahida Akter 3/12 (3.5 overs)		Sanjida Islam 30 (34); Akshatha Rao 2/2 (1 over)

Bangladesh Women won by 8 wickets
Lochlands Park, Arbroath
Umpires: Lauren Agenbag (SA) and Sue Redfern (Eng)
Player of the match: Nahida Akter (Ban)

- United States Women won the toss and elected to bat.
- Akshatha Rao took a wicket with her first delivery in T20Is.

2 September 2019
10:00
Scorecard

Bangladesh; 103/8 (16.3 overs)	v	Papua New Guinea; 52/5 (8 overs)
Fahima Khatun 32* (18); Sibona Jimmy 3/17 (3.3 overs)		Tanya Ruma 12 (13); Nahida Akter 3/10 (2 overs)

Bangladesh Women won by 6 runs (DLS method)
Forthill, Dundee
Umpires: Sue Redfern (Eng) and Eloise Sheridan (Aus)
Player of the match: Nahida Akter (Ban)

- Papua New Guinea Women won the toss and elected to field.
- The match was scheduled to be played on 31 August 2019, but was abandoned due to rain and moved to the reserve day.
- Papua New Guinea Women were set a revised target of 59 runs from 8 overs due to rain.

3 September 2019
14:00
Scorecard

Bangladesh; 104/4 (17 overs)	v	Scotland; 49/6 (8 overs)
Nigar Sultana 35* (37); Kathryn Bryce 2/13 (3 overs)		Kathryn Bryce 21 (20); Khadija Tul Kubra 1/7 (1 over)

Bangladesh Women won by 13 runs (DLS method)
Forthill, Dundee
Umpires: Eloise Sheridan (Aus) and Jacqueline Williams (WI)
Player of the match: Nigar Sultana (Ban)

- Scotland Women won the toss and elected to field.
- Scotland Women were set a revised target of 63 runs from 8 overs due to rain.

3 September 2019
14:00
Scorecard

Papua New Guinea; 133/3 (20 overs)	v	United States; 94/7 (17 overs)
Sibona Jimmy 58* (50); Sara Farooq 1/19 (3.2 overs)		Erica Rendler 35 (26); Sibona Jimmy 3/15 (4 overs)

Papua New Guinea Women won by 22 runs (DLS method)
Lochlands Park, Arbroath
Umpires: Lauren Agenbag (SA) and Claire Polosak (Aus)
Player of the match: Sibona Jimmy (PNG)

- United States Women won the toss and elected to field.
- United States Women were set a revised target of 117 runs from 17 overs due to rain.
- Nerela Ila (PNG) made her WT20I debut.

=== Group B ===
Pos	Team	Pld	W	L	T	NR	Pts	NRR
1	Thailand	3	3	0	0	0	6	1.522
2	Ireland	3	2	1	0	0	4	0.905
3	Netherlands	3	1	2	0	0	2	−0.615
4	Namibia	3	0	3	0	0	0	−1.503

31 August 2019
10:00
Scorecard

Thailand; 76/0 (9 overs)	v	Netherlands; 46/5 (9 overs)
Naruemol Chaiwai 44* (32)		Babette de Leede 20* (21); Chanida Sutthiruang 3/5 (2 overs)

Thailand Women won by 30 runs
Lochlands Park, Arbroath
Umpires: Lauren Agenbag (SA) and Claire Polosak (Aus)
Player of the match: Chanida Sutthiruang (Tha)

- Thailand Women won the toss and elected to bat.
- The match was reduced to 9 overs per side due to rain.

31 August 2019
14:00
Scorecard

Namibia; 83/9 (20 overs)	v	Ireland; 86/3 (14.3 overs)
Petro Enright 20 (33); Eimear Richardson 2/10 (4 overs)		Mary Waldron 33 (30); Wilka Mwatile 1/12 (2 overs)

Ireland Women won by 7 wickets
Lochlands Park, Arbroath
Umpires: Claire Polosak (Aus) and Jacqueline Williams (WI)
Player of the match: Mary Waldron (Ire)

- Ireland Women won the toss and elected to field.
- Petro Enright (Nam) made her WT20I debut.

1 September 2019
10:00
Scorecard

Thailand; 99/6 (20 overs)	v	Namibia; 61 (19.2 overs)
Sornnarin Tippoch 37* (41); Sylvia Shihepo 3/8 (3 overs)		Wilka Mwatile 16 (20); Chanida Sutthiruang 4/13 (3.2 overs)

Thailand Women won by 38 runs
Forthill, Dundee
Umpires: Claire Polosak (Aus) and Eloise Sheridan (Aus)
Player of the match: Chanida Sutthiruang (Tha)

- Thailand Women won the toss and elected to bat.

1 September 2019
14:00
Scorecard

Ireland; 120/6 (20 overs)	v	Netherlands; 101/5 (20 overs)
Kim Garth 39 (35); Caroline de Lange 2/28 (4 overs)		Sterre Kalis 46 (58); Laura Delany 2/17 (4 overs)

Ireland Women won by 19 runs
Forthill, Dundee
Umpires: Eloise Sheridan (Aus) and Jacqueline Williams (WI)
Player of the match: Laura Delany (Ire)

- Ireland Women won the toss and elected to bat.

3 September 2019
10:00
Scorecard

Thailand; 92/7 (17 overs)	v	Ireland; 90/9 (17 overs)
Naruemol Chaiwai 24 (33); Leah Paul 3/0 (3 overs)		Eimear Richardson 21 (19); Chanida Sutthiruang 3/14 (4 overs)

Thailand Women won by 2 runs (DLS method)
Forthill, Dundee
Umpires: Sue Redfern (Eng) and Jacqueline Williams (WI)
Player of the match: Suleeporn Laomi (Tha)

- Ireland Women won the toss and elected to field.
- Ireland Women were set a revised target of 93 runs from 17 overs due to rain.

3 September 2019
10:00
Scorecard

Namibia; 91/8 (20 overs)	v	Netherlands; 95/4 (17.1 overs)
Adri van der Merwe 29 (34); Iris Zwilling 3/11 (4 overs)		Sterre Kalis 34 (38); Wilka Mwatile 2/10 (3 overs)

Netherlands Women won by 6 wickets
Lochlands Park, Arbroath
Umpires: Lauren Agenbag (SA) and Kim Cotton (NZ)
Player of the match: Heather Siegers (Ned)

- Namibia Women won the toss and elected to bat.

== Semi-finals ==
The semi-finals saw Bangladesh and Thailand win their respective matches, to see them both progress to the tournament's final and the 2020 ICC Women's T20 World Cup tournament in Australia. Ireland made 85 runs from their 20 overs, with Bangladesh chasing down their target to win by four wickets. Papua New Guinea only scored 67 runs in their 20 overs, with Thailand going on to win the fixture by eight wickets.

In the play-off semi-finals, both teams batting second recorded big wins against their opponents. The United States made 90 for 4, with Nadia Gruny scoring an unbeaten fifty. However, the Netherlands chased down their target to win by nine wickets. In the final match of the day, Namibia were bowled out for 67 runs inside 18 overs. With only 68 runs needed for victory, Scotland reached their target in 8.4 overs, winning the match by ten wickets.

Semi-final 1
5 September 2019
10:00
Scorecard

Ireland; 85 (20 overs)	v	Bangladesh; 86/6 (18.3 overs)
Eimear Richardson 25 (17); Fahima Khatun 3/18 (4 overs)		Sanjida Islam 32* (37); Orla Prendergast 2/11 (3.3 overs)

Bangladesh Women won by 4 wickets
Forthill, Dundee
Umpires: Sue Redfern (Eng) and Eloise Sheridan (Aus)
Player of the match: Sanjida Islam (Ban)

- Ireland Women won the toss and elected to bat.

Play-off semi-final 1
5 September 2019
10:00
Scorecard

United States; 90/4 (20 overs)	v	Netherlands; 91/1 (17.4 overs)
Nadia Gruny 53* (60); Silver Siegers 2/10 (4 overs)		Denise van Deventer 38* (48); Akshatha Rao 1/21 (4 overs)

Netherlands Women won by 9 wickets
Lochlands Park, Arbroath
Umpires: Lauren Agenbag (SA) and Kim Cotton (NZ)
Player of the match: Nadia Gruny (USA)

- United States Women won the toss and elected to bat.
- Mahika Kandanala (USA) made her WT20I debut.

Semi-final 2
5 September 2019
14:00
Scorecard

Papua New Guinea; 67/7 (20 overs)	v	Thailand; 68/2 (17.3 overs)
Kaia Arua 16* (31); Chanida Sutthiruang 2/15 (4 overs)		Naruemol Chaiwai 32 (40); Ravina Oa 1/7 (3.3 overs)

Thailand Women won by 8 wickets
Forthill, Dundee
Umpires: Claire Polosak (Aus) and Eloise Sheridan (Aus)
Player of the match: Suleeporn Laomi (Tha)

- Papua New Guinea Women won the toss and elected to bat.

Play-off semi-final 2
5 September 2019
14:00
Scorecard

Namibia; 67 (17.4 overs)	v	Scotland; 68/0 (8.4 overs)
Irene van Zyl 15* (21); Kathryn Bryce 2/6 (3 overs)		Sarah Bryce 37* (30)

Scotland Women won by 10 wickets
Lochlands Park, Arbroath
Umpires: Kim Cotton (NZ) and Jacqueline Williams (WI)
Player of the match: Sarah Bryce (Sco)

- Scotland Women won the toss and elected to field.

== Play-off matches ==
In the third-place playoff, Ireland had a convincing win against Papua New Guinea. Konio Oala was the only cricketer for Papua New Guinea to reach double figures, making 35 runs, as the team finished on 85/8 from their twenty overs. Ireland chased down the target inside twelve overs, to win by eight wickets. The playoff for seventh place saw the United States beat Namibia by six wickets, with the US team chasing down a target of 85 to win in the penultimate over of the match.

The last pair of matches in the tournament started with the fifth-place playoff between Scotland and the Netherlands. Sisters Kathryn and Sarah Bryce both made half centuries, with Scotland scoring 167/4 in their twenty overs. In reply, the Netherlands were bowled out for 97 runs, with Miranda Veringmeier top-scoring with 45, and Scotland winning by 70 runs. In the tournament's final, Bangladesh beat Thailand, also by the margin of 70 runs, with Sanjida Islam scoring 71 not out.

7th Place Playoff
7 September 2019
10:00
Scorecard

Namibia; 84/7 (20 overs)	v	United States; 85/4 (18.5 overs)
Jurriene Diergaardt 33 (47); Samantha Ramautar 2/10 (4 overs)		Nadia Gruny 33 (54); Dietlind Foerster 2/9 (3 overs)

United States Women won by 6 wickets
Lochlands Park, Arbroath
Umpires: Sue Redfern (Eng) and Eloise Sheridan (Aus)
Player of the match: Samantha Ramautar (USA)

- United States Women won the toss and elected to field.

3rd Place Playoff
7 September 2019
10:00
Scorecard

Papua New Guinea; 85/8 (20 overs)	v	Ireland; 86/2 (11.1 overs)
Konio Oala 35 (31); Eimear Richardson 3/9 (4 overs)		Kim Garth 29 (29); Isabel Toua 1/4 (1.1 overs)

Ireland Women won by 8 wickets
Forthill, Dundee
Umpires: Kim Cotton (NZ) and Claire Polosak (Aus)
Player of the match: Kim Garth (Ire)

- Ireland Women won the toss and elected to field.

5th Place Playoff
7 September 2019
14:00
Scorecard

Scotland; 167/4 (20 overs)	v	Netherlands; 97 (19.4 overs)
Kathryn Bryce 73* (50); Heather Siegers 2/22 (4 overs)		Miranda Veringmeier 45 (33); Abtaha Maqsood 3/27 (4 overs)

Scotland Women won by 70 runs
Lochlands Park, Arbroath
Umpires: Lauren Agenbag (SA) and Sue Redfern (Eng)
Player of the match: Sarah Bryce (Sco)

- Netherlands Women won the toss and elected to field.

Final
7 September 2019
14:00
Scorecard

Bangladesh; 130/5 (20 overs)	v	Thailand; 60/7 (20 overs)
Sanjida Islam 71* (60); Nattaya Boochatham 2/31 (4 overs)		Ratanaporn Padunglerd 15* (14); Shaila Sharmin 2/9 (3 overs)

Bangladesh Women won by 70 runs
Forthill, Dundee
Umpires: Claire Polosak (Aus) and Jacqueline Williams (WI)
Player of the match: Sanjida Islam (Ban)

- Bangladesh Women won the toss and elected to bat.

== Final standings ==
Position	Team
1st	Bangladesh
2nd	Thailand
3rd	Ireland
4th	Papua New Guinea
5th	Scotland
6th	Netherlands
7th	United States
8th	Namibia

Qualified for the 2020 World Twenty20.
