= Jurriene Diergaardt =

Namibian cricketer (born 2000)

Personal information
- Full name: Jurriene Arrasta Diergaardt
- Born: 16 July 2000 (age 26); Okaku, Namibia
- Batting: Right-handed
- Bowling: Right-arm medium

International information
- National side: Namibia
- T20I debut (cap 1): 20 August 2018 v Malawi
- Last T20I: 14 September 2024 v Zimbabwe

Career statistics
Competition	WT20I
Matches	69
Runs scored	665
Batting average	13.85
100s/50s	0/1
Top score	62*
Balls bowled	557
Wickets	28
Bowling average	16.96
5 wickets in innings	0
10 wickets in match	0
Best bowling	4/15
Catches/stumpings	15/–
- Source: Cricinfo, 7 October 2024

Jurriene Arrasta Diergaardt (born 16 July 2000) is a Namibian cricketer. She made her Women's Twenty20 International (WT20I) debut for the Namibia women's cricket team on 20 August 2018, against Malawi, in the 2018 Botswana Cricket Association Women's T20I Series. It was the first WT20I match to be played by Namibia.

In August 2019, she was named in Namibia's squad for the 2019 ICC Women's World Twenty20 Qualifier tournament in Scotland. She played in Namibia's second match of the tournament, on 1 September 2019, against Thailand. In May 2021, she was named in Namibia's squad for the 2021 Kwibuka Women's T20 Tournament in Rwanda.
