= Yasmeen Khan (cricketer) =

Namibian cricketer

Personal information
- Full name: Yasmeen Khan
- Born: 7 January 1999 (age 27); George, South Africa
- Batting: Right-handed
- Bowling: Right-arm medium

International information
- National side: Namibia
- T20I debut (cap 11): 20 August 2018 v Malawi
- Last T20I: 14 September 2024 v Zimbabwe

Domestic team information
- Years: Team
- 2021/22–2022/23: Western Province

Career statistics
Competition	WT20I
Matches	78
Runs scored	1,366
Batting average	22.93
100s/50s	0/6
Top score	78*
Balls bowled	156
Wickets	9
Bowling average	13.44
5 wickets in innings	0
10 wickets in match	0
Best bowling	4/20
Catches/stumpings	33/4
- Source: Cricinfo, 7 October 2024

Yasmeen Khan (born 7 January 1999) is a Namibian cricketer and a former captain of the women's national cricket team. Currently the vice captain, she plays as a right-handed batter, right-arm medium pace bowler, and occasional wicket-keeper.

== Early life ==
Khan was born in George, in the Western Cape province of South Africa. She and her parents moved to Namibia when she was less than a year old, and she was raised in Windhoek. Her father is from Karachi, Pakistan, and is a cricket fanatic. Her mother is even more passionate about sports.

As a young child, Khan would watch cricket on television with her father. She also played the game in the backyard at home. In 2022, she reminisced with The Express Tribune about visiting Karachi as a six year old, and seeing boys playing cricket in the streets: "... it was so intense, yet looked fun." At the age of 10, she felt old enough to become a member of the boys' cricket team at primary school, and decided to take up the game in a formal sense.

Initially, Khan played for the u/13 boys team. Over time, she progressed to the u/17s, then the second team, and finally the first team. She found that playing against boys was a challenge, as they hit harder and bowled faster. They also had a lot of banter about girls playing cricket, but Khan has said that her teammates never undermined her. Her role models were Pakistani cricketers Shahid Afridi, and, especially, Younis Khan, who influenced her batting style. She has also been inspired by Novak Djokovic and Alyssa Healy.

The year after starting to play school cricket, Khan joined the u/13 girls national team. In 2013, aged 14, she was called up to the women's national team. In 2018, after matriculating, she took a gap year to train and play cricket for her country.

== Domestic career ==
At the domestic level in Namibia, Khan plays for the Zebras Cricket Club, as an all rounder.

For the 2021–22 season of the Cricket South Africa Women's Provincial Programme, Khan was recruited by the Western Province team. She made her debut for the team on 12 February 2022, in a match against KwaZulu-Natal Inland.

== International career ==
In 2013, after being called up to the national team at the age of 14, Khan played for the team in a tournament in Tanzania later in the year. However, at that stage of her life she gave priority to her school schedule and commitments.

Khan made her Women's Twenty20 International (WT20I) debut for Namibia on 20 August 2018, against Malawi in the 2018 Botswana Cricket Association Women's T20I Series in Gaborone, Botswana. She also captained the team in what was its first ever WT20I match. Later in the tournament, she led Namibia to the final, including by scoring 61 against Lesotho. In the final, in which Namibia defeated Sierra Leone by nine wickets, she was player of the match for scoring 37 runs in 38 balls.

In January 2019, Khan captained Namibia in a bilateral series against Zimbabwe played at Walvis Bay, Namibia. Three months later, she led Namibia in another home bilateral series, against Botswana in Windhoek. Namibia lost the first series, but won the second, with Khan topping the batting averages in the latter series.

Khan then captained her team in the ICC Women's Qualifier Africa in Harare, Zimbabwe. After topping group B, Namibia was defeated by Zimbabwe in the final, a result from which, according to Khan, the team took "... a lot of positives ..." Zimbabwe therefore qualified for both the 2019 ICC Women's World Twenty20 Qualifier and the 2021 Women's Cricket World Cup Qualifier tournaments. However, as the International Cricket Council (ICC) later barred Zimbabwe for a short time from taking part in ICC events, Namibia replaced the Zimbabwe team in the first of those two tournaments.

In August 2019, Khan led Namibia in the Twenty20 Qualifier, which was held in Scotland. She was Namibia's leading run-scorer in the tournament, with 55 runs in five matches.

During 2020, Khan stepped down from the captaincy of the team, as her studies were placing a lot of demands and responsibilities on her. At about the same time, after suffering a back injury, she took up wicket-keeping, a role that she has since taken on when it is helpful to the national team for her to do so.

In May 2021, Khan was named as Namibia's vice-captain for the 2021 Kwibuka Women's T20 Tournament in Kigali, Rwanda. In the tenth match, against Botswana, she scored 31*, and in the first semi-final, against Nigeria, she was player of the match, with 78*. After Kenya defeated Namibia in the final, she was named in the team of the tournament, selected by the Rwanda Cricket Association. In September 2021, she played in the ICC Women's T20 World Cup Africa Qualifier in Gaborone, Botswana, in which Namibia finished as one of the four teams to advance to the next Qualifier. In Namibia's 2020/21 Cricket Annual Awards, she was named as the national team's batter of the year.

In April 2022, Khan played in the 2022 Capricorn Women's Tri-Series in Windhoek. In the first match of the tournament, between Namibia and Zimbabwe, she scored 36 to take a prominent role in Namibia's first ever victory against a full member of the ICC. Zimbabwe later beat Namibia in the final of the tri-series, by seven wickets.

== Off the field ==
As of 2022, Khan was studying visual communications and graphics. She enjoys music, and sometimes plays the guitar, not as well as she would like. She is also a photographer and designer.

== See also ==
- List of Namibia women Twenty20 International cricketers
