= Irene van Zyl =

Namibian cricketer (born 1984)

Personal information
- Full name: Irene van Zyl
- Born: 27 November 1984 (age 41); Windhoek, Namibia
- Batting: Right-handed
- Bowling: Right-arm offbreak

International information
- National side: Namibia
- T20I debut (cap 18): 1 April 2019 v Botswana
- Last T20I: 22 September 2024 v United Arab Emirates

Career statistics
Competition	WT20I
Matches	64
Runs scored	262
Batting average	10.97
100s/50s	0/0
Top score	23
Balls bowled	1,096
Wickets	44
Bowling average	19.75
5 wickets in innings	0
10 wickets in match	0
Best bowling	4/7
Catches/stumpings	11/–
- Source: Cricinfo, 7 October 2024

Irene van Zyl (born 27 November 1984) is a Namibian cricketer and the current captain of the Namibia women's cricket team.

She made her Women's Twenty20 International (WT20I) debut for Namibia on 1 April 2019, against Botswana, during Botswana's tour of Namibia.

In August 2019, she was named in Namibia's squad for the 2019 ICC Women's World Twenty20 Qualifier tournament in Scotland. She played in Namibia's opening match of the tournament, on 31 August 2019, against Ireland. In May 2021, she was named as the captain of the Namibian team for the 2021 Kwibuka Women's T20 Tournament in Rwanda.
