= Kayleen Green =

Namibian cricketer (born 1998)

Personal information
- Full name: Kayleen Green
- Born: 3 June 1998 (age 28); Windhoek, Namibia
- Batting: Right-handed
- Bowling: Right-arm medium

International information
- National side: Namibia
- T20I debut (cap 3): 20 August 2018 v Malawi
- Last T20I: 10 March 2024 v Tanzania

Career statistics
Competition	WT20I
Matches	72
Runs scored	737
Batting average	15.35
100s/50s	0/2
Top score	57
Balls bowled	1,327
Wickets	69
Bowling average	13.43
5 wickets in innings	0
10 wickets in match	0
Best bowling	3/8
Catches/stumpings	19/4
- Source: Cricinfo, 7 October 2024

Kayleen Green (born 3 June 1998) is a Namibian cricketer. She made her Women's Twenty20 International (WT20I) debut for the Namibia women's cricket team on 20 August 2018, against Malawi, in the 2018 Botswana Cricket Association Women's T20I Series. It was the first WT20I match to be played by Namibia.

In August 2019, she was named in Namibia's squad for the 2019 ICC Women's World Twenty20 Qualifier tournament in Scotland. She played in Namibia's opening match of the tournament, on 31 August 2019, against Ireland. In May 2021, she was named in Namibia's squad for the 2021 Kwibuka Women's T20 Tournament in Rwanda. Following the conclusion of the tournament, Green was named in the team of the tournament, selected by the Rwanda Cricket Association.
