= Sylvia Shihepo =

Namibian cricketer (born 2000)

Personal information
- Full name: Sylvia Nanghali Shihepo
- Born: 21 November 2000 (age 25); Onesi, Namibia
- Batting: Right-handed
- Bowling: Right-arm medium

International information
- National side: Namibia
- T20I debut (cap 8): 20 August 2018 v Malawi
- Last T20I: 14 September 2024 v Zimbabwe

Career statistics
Competition	WT20I
Matches	66
Runs scored	183
Batting average	10.16
100s/50s	0/0
Top score	25*
Balls bowled	738
Wickets	44
Bowling average	13.31
5 wickets in innings	0
10 wickets in match	0
Best bowling	3/6
Catches/stumpings	15/–
- Source: Cricinfo, 7 October 2024

Sylvia Shihepo (born 21 November 2000) is a Namibian cricketer. She made her Women's Twenty20 International (WT20I) debut for the Namibia women's cricket team on 20 August 2018, against Malawi, in the 2018 Botswana Cricket Association Women's T20I Series. It was the first WT20I match to be played by Namibia.

In August 2019, she was named in Namibia's squad for the 2019 ICC Women's World Twenty20 Qualifier tournament in Scotland. She played in Namibia's opening match of the tournament, on 31 August 2019, against Ireland. In May 2021, she was named in Namibia's squad for the 2021 Kwibuka Women's T20 Tournament in Rwanda.
