= Malawi women's national cricket team =

Cricket team

Malawi
- Cricket Malawi logo
- Association: Cricket Malawi

Personnel
- Captain: Mary Mabvuka

International Cricket Council
- ICC status: Associate member (2017); Affiliate member (2003)
- ICC region: Africa
ICC Rankings	Current	Best-ever
T20I	65th	41st (6 Feb 2019)

T20 Internationals
- First T20I: v Namibia at Botswana Cricket Association Oval 2, Gaborone; 20 August 2018
- Last T20I: v Brazil at Gahanga International Cricket Stadium, Kigali; 17 June 2026
T20Is	Played	Won/Lost
Total	49	18/31 (0 ties, 0 no results)
This year	14	6/8 (0 ties, 0 no results)
- As of 17 June 2026

The Malawi women's national cricket team represents Malawi in women's cricket matches.

In April 2018, the International Cricket Council (ICC) granted full Women's Twenty20 International (WT20I) status to all its members. Therefore, all Twenty20 matches played between Malawi women and other ICC members since 1 July 2018 have the full WT20I status.

Malawi's first WT20I matches were contested as part of the Botswana 7s tournament in August 2018 against Botswana, Lesotho, Mozambique, Namibia, Sierra Leone and Zambia (Zambia's matches were not classified as WT20Is as they had a Botswanan player in their squad). Malawi finished fifth on the table with one win and four losses and won the fifth place play-off against Lesotho by nine wickets.

In December 2020, the ICC announced the qualification pathway for the 2023 ICC Women's T20 World Cup. The Malawi women's team are scheduled to make their debut at an ICC women's event when they play in the 2021 ICC Women's T20 World Cup Africa Qualifier group.

== Records and statistics ==
International Match Summary — Malawi Women

Last updated 17 June 2026

Playing Record
Format	M	W	L	T	NR	Inaugural Match
Twenty20 Internationals	49	18	31	0	0	20 August 2018

=== Twenty20 International ===
- Highest team total: 189/5 v Lesotho on 2 September 2023 at Botswana Cricket Association Oval 2, Gaborone.
- Highest individual score: 74*, Lidia Dimba v Lesotho on 2 September 2023 at Botswana Cricket Association Oval 2, Gaborone.
- Best individual bowling figures: 5/16, Triphonia Luka v Mozambique on 7 November 2019 at Saint Andrews International High School, Blantyre.

T20I record versus other nations

Records complete to WT20I #2864. Last updated 17 June 2026.

Opponent	M	W	L	T	NR	First match	First win
ICC Associate members
Botswana	5	0	5	0	0	20 August 2018	
Brazil	4	0	4	0	0	3 June 2025	
Cameroon	4	4	0	0	0	4 June 2024	4 June 2024
Kenya	2	0	2	0	0	3 September 2023	
Lesotho	6	6	0	0	0	21 August 2018	21 August 2018
Mozambique	10	6	4	0	0	24 August 2018	6 November 2019
Namibia	1	0	1	0	0	20 August 2018	
Nigeria	4	0	4	0	0	7 June 2024	
Rwanda	5	0	5	0	0	31 May 2024	
Sierra Leone	3	0	3	0	0	23 August 2018	
Tanzania	1	0	1	0	0	4 June 2025	
Uganda	2	0	2	0	0	3 June 2024	
Zambia	2	2	0	0	0	9 April 2026	9 April 2026

== Tournament history ==
=== ICC Women's ODI World Cup ===
Women's Cricket World Cup records
Host Year	Round	Position	GP	W	L	T	NR
(England) 1973	Did not qualified						
(India) 1978	Did not qualified						
(New Zealand) 1982	Did not qualified						
(Australia) 1988	Did not qualified						
(England) 1993	Did not qualified						
(India) 1997	Did not qualified						
(New Zealand) 2000	Did not qualified						
(South Africa) 2005	Did not qualified						
(Australia) 2009	Did not qualified						
(India) 2013	Did not qualified						
(England) 2017	Did not qualified						
(New Zealand) 2022	Did not qualified						
(India) 2025	Did not qualified						
Total	0/13	0 Titles	0	0	0	0	0

=== ICC Women's World T20 ===
Twenty20 World Cup records
Host Year	Round	Position	GP	W	L	T	NR
(England) 2009	Did not qualify						
(Cricket West Indies) 2010	Did not qualify						
(Sri Lanka) 2012	Did not qualify						
(Bangladesh) 2014	Did not qualify						
(India) 2016	Did not qualify						
(Cricket West Indies) 2018	Did not qualify						
(Australia) 2020	Did not qualify						
(South Africa) 2023	Did not qualify						
(United Arab Emirates) 2024	Did not qualify						
(England) 2026	To be determined						
Total	0/10	0 Titles	0	0	0	0	0

=== ICC Women's Cricket World Cup Qualifier ===
ICC Women's Cricket World Cup Qualifier record
Host Year	Round	Position	GP	W	L	T	NR
(Netherlands) 2003	Did not qualify						
(South Africa) 2008	Did not qualify						
(Bangladesh) 2011	Did not qualify						
(Sri Lanka) 2017	Did not qualify						
(Zimbabwe) 2021	Did not qualify						
(Pakistan) 2025	Did not qualify						
Total	0/5	0 Title	0	0	0	0	0

=== ICC Women's World Twenty20 Qualifier ===
ICC Women's World Twenty20 Qualifier records
Host Year	Round	Position	GP	W	L	T	NR
(Republic of Ireland) 2013	Did not qualify						
(Thailand) 2015	Did not qualify						
(Netherlands) 2018	Did not qualify						
(Scotland) 2019	Did not qualify						
(United Arab Emirates) 2022	Did not qualify						
(United Arab Emirates) 2024	Did not qualify						
Total	0/6	0 Titles	0	0	0	0	0

=== ICC Women's T20 Champions Trophy ===
ICC Women's T20 Champions Trophy records
Host Year	Round	Position	GP	W	L	T	NR
(Sri Lanka) 2027	To be determined						
2031	To be determined						
Total	–	0 Title	0	0	0	0	0

=== Cricket at the African Games ===
Cricket at the African Games records
Host Year	Round	Position	GP	W	L	T	NR
(Ghana) 2023	Did not participate						
(Egypt) 2027	To be determined						
(Democratic Republic of the Congo) 2031	To be determined						
Total	0/1	0 Title	5	2	2	0	1

=== ICC Women's T20 World Cup Qualifier ===
ICC Women's World Twenty20 Qualifier records
Year	Round	Position	GP	W	L	T	NR
(Republic of Ireland) 2013	Did not qualify						
(Thailand) 2015	Did not qualify						
(Netherlands) 2018	Did not qualify						
(Scotland) 2019	Did not qualify						
(United Arab Emirates) 2022	Did not qualify						
(United Arab Emirates) 2024	Did not qualify						
(Nepal) 2026	To be determined						
Total	0/6	0 Title	3	0	3	0	0

=== ICC Women's T20 World Cup Africa Qualifier ===
Women's T20 World Cup Qualifier records
Year	Round	Position	GP	W	L	T	NR
(Zimbabwe) 2019	Did not participate						
(Botswana) 2021	Did not participate						
(Uganda) 2023	DNQ	–	3	1	2	0	0
(Botswana) 2025	To be determined						
Total	1/3	0 Title	3	1	2	0	0

=== Kwibuka Women's T20 Tournament ===
Kwibuka T20 Tournament records
Year	Round	Position	GP	W	L	T	NR
(Rwanda) 2014	Did not participate						
(Rwanda) 2015	Did not participate						
(Rwanda) 2016	Did not participate						
(Rwanda) 2017	Did not participate						
(Rwanda) 2018	Did not participate						
(Rwanda) 2019	Did not participate						
(Rwanda) 2021	Did not participate						
(Rwanda) 2022	Did not participate						
(Rwanda) 2023	Did not participate						
(Rwanda) 2024	Round-robin	7/8	7	1	6	0	0
(Rwanda) 2025	Round-robin	7/9	8	1	7	0	0
Total	2/11	0 Title	15	2	13	0	0

== See also ==
- List of Malawi women Twenty20 International cricketers
