= Namibia women's national cricket team =

Cricket team

Namibia
- Association: Cricket Namibia

Personnel
- Captain: Sune Wittmann
- Coach: Francois van der Merwe

International Cricket Council
- ICC status: Associate member (1992)
- ICC region: Africa
ICC Rankings	Current	Best-ever
T20I	18th	17th (4 May 2023)

International cricket
- First international: v. Kenya at Dar es Salaam; 8 April 2004

T20 Internationals
- First T20I: v. Malawi at Botswana Cricket Association Oval 2, Gaborone; 20 August 2018
- Last T20I: v. United States at Entebbe Cricket Oval, Entebbe; 14 November 2026
T20Is	Played	Won/Lost
Total	131	70/59 (1 tie, 1 no result)
This year	18	8/9 (1 tie, 0 no results)
- T20 World Cup Qualifier appearances: 1 (first in 2019)
- Best result: 8th (2019)
T20I kit
- As of 14 November 2026

The Namibia women's national cricket team, nicknamed the Capricorn Eagles, represents Namibia in international women's cricket. The team is organised by Cricket Namibia, which has been a member of the International Cricket Council (ICC) since 1992.

== History ==
Namibia made its international debut at the 2004 ICC Africa Women's Twenty20 Championship in Tanzania, but failed to win a match. The team's closest result came in the opening match against Kenya, where they were bowled out for 106, and eventually lost by five wickets. In the second game, against Uganda, they lost by 152 runs, while in the final game, against Tanzania, they were bowled out for just 29, and lost by ten wickets. After their debut, Namibia did not compete in another Africa-wide tournament until the 2011 ICC Africa Women's Twenty20 Championship in Uganda. They have since regularly competed in ICC Africa competitions, without much success. Namibia also play in regional competitions against other southern African teams, and in the past have appeared in South African provincial competitions (as the national men's team does).

In April 2018, the International Cricket Council (ICC) granted full Women's Twenty20 International (WT20I) status to all its members. Therefore, all Twenty20 matches played between Namibia women and other ICC members since 1 July 2018 have the full WT20I status.

Namibia's first WT20I matches were contested as part of the Botswana 7s tournament in August 2018 against Botswana, Lesotho, Malawi, Mozambique, Sierra Leone and Zambia (Zambia's matches were not classified as WT20Is as they had a Botswanan player in their squad). Namibia finished top of the table, winning all five group stage matches and won the final against Sierra Leone by a margin of nine wickets.

In July 2019, the International Cricket Council (ICC) suspended Zimbabwe Cricket, with the team barred from taking part in ICC events. The following month, with Zimbabwe banned from taking part in international cricket tournaments, the ICC confirmed that Namibia would replace them in the 2019 ICC Women's World Twenty20 Qualifier tournament.

In December 2020, the ICC announced the qualification pathway for the 2023 ICC Women's T20 World Cup. Namibia were named in the 2021 ICC Women's T20 World Cup Africa Qualifier regional group, alongside ten other teams.

In March 2024, Cricket Namibia awarded professional contracts to members of the women's team for the first time, with 10 players receiving a contract. As a result, Cricket Namibia became the first sporting body in Namibia to award central contracts to both men and women.

== Tournament history ==
=== Women's ODI World Cup ===
Women's Cricket World Cup records
Host Year	Round	Position	GP	W	L	T	NR
(England) 1973	Did not qualified						
(India) 1978	Did not qualified						
(New Zealand) 1982	Did not qualified						
(Australia) 1988	Did not qualified						
(England) 1993	Did not qualified						
(India) 1997	Did not qualified						
(New Zealand) 2000	Did not qualified						
(South Africa) 2005	Did not qualified						
(Australia) 2009	Did not qualified						
(India) 2013	Did not qualified						
(England) 2017	Did not qualified						
(New Zealand) 2022	Did not qualified						
(India) 2025	Did not qualified						
Total	0/13	0 Titles	0	0	0	0	0

=== Women's World T20 ===
Twenty20 World Cup records
Host Year	Round	Position	GP	W	L	T	NR
(England) 2009	Did not qualify						
(Cricket West Indies) 2010	Did not qualify						
(Sri Lanka) 2012	Did not qualify						
(Bangladesh) 2014	Did not qualify						
(India) 2016	Did not qualify						
(Cricket West Indies) 2018	Did not qualify						
(Australia) 2020	Did not qualify						
(South Africa) 2023	Did not qualify						
(United Arab Emirates) 2024	Did not qualify						
(England) 2026	To be determined						
Total	–	0 Titles	0	0	0	0	0

=== Women's Cricket World Cup Qualifier ===
ICC Women's Cricket World Cup Qualifier record
Host Year	Round	Position	GP	W	L	T	NR
(Netherlands) 2003	Did not participate						
(South Africa) 2008	Group stage	–	3	1	2	0	0
(Bangladesh) 2011	Group stage	10/10	4	0	4	0	0
(Sri Lanka) 2017	Group stage	–	4	1	3	0	0
(Zimbabwe) 2021	Group stage	–	3	1	2	0	0
(Pakistan) 2025	Did not qualify						
Total	4/5	0 Title	14	3	11	0	0

=== ICC Women's World Twenty20 Qualifier ===
ICC Women's World Twenty20 Qualifier records
Host Year	Round	Position	GP	W	L	T	NR
(Republic of Ireland) 2013	Group stage	6/7	3	1	2	0	0
(Thailand) 2015	3rd place	3/8	5	3	2	0	0
(Netherlands) 2018	Did not participate						
(Scotland) 2019	Did not participate						
(United Arab Emirates) 2022	Did not participate						
(United Arab Emirates) 2024	Did not participate						
Total	2/6	0 Titles	8	4	4	0	0

=== ICC Women's T20 World Cup Africa Qualifier ===
ICC Women's T20 World Cup Africa Qualifier records
Year	Round	Position	GP	W	L	T	NR
(Zimbabwe) 2019	Group stages	–	4	1	3	0	0
(Botswana) 2021	Group stages	–	4	2	2	0	0
Total	2/2	–	8	3	5	0	0

=== ICC Women's T20 Champions Trophy ===
ICC Women's T20 Champions Trophy records
Host Year	Round	Position	GP	W	L	T	NR
(Sri Lanka) 2027	To be determined						
2031	To be determined						
Total	–	0 Title	0	0	0	0	0

=== Cricket at the African Games ===
Cricket at the African Games records
Host Year	Round	Position	GP	W	L	T	NR
(Ghana) 2023	3rd place	3/8	5	2	2	0	1
(Egypt) 2027	To be determined						
(Democratic Republic of the Congo) 2031	To be determined						
Total	1/1	0 Title	5	2	2	0	1

=== ICC Women's T20 World Cup Qualifier ===
ICC Women's World Twenty20 Qualifier records
Year	Round	Position	GP	W	L	T	NR
(Republic of Ireland) 2013	Did not qualify						
(Thailand) 2015	Did not qualify						
(Netherlands) 2018	Did not qualify						
(Scotland) 2019	Did not qualify	8/8	3	0	3	0	0
(United Arab Emirates) 2022	Did not qualify						
(United Arab Emirates) 2024	Did not qualify						
(Nepal) 2025	To be determined						
Total	1/6	0 Title	3	0	3	0	0

=== ICC Women's T20 World Cup Africa Qualifier ===
Women's T20 World Cup Qualifier records
Year	Round	Position	GP	W	L	T	NR
(Zimbabwe) 2019	Qualified; Runners-up	2/9	4	3	1	0	0
(Botswana) 2021	DNQ; Runners-up	2/11	5	4	1	0	0
(Uganda) 2023	DNQ	–	5	2	2	0	1
Total	3/3	0 Title	14	9	4	0	1

=== ICC Women's T20 World Cup Africa Qualifier Division One ===
ICC Women's T20 World Cup Africa Qualifier Division One records
Year	Round	Position	GP	W	L	T	NR
(Uganda) 2023	Group stages	–	5	2	2	0	1
(Namibia) 2025	Qualified; Runners-up	2/8	5	3	2	0	0
Total	2/2	0 Title	10	5	4	0	1

=== Kwibuka Women's T20 Tournament ===
Kwibuka T20 Tournament records
Year	Round	Position	GP	W	L	T	NR
(Rwanda) 2014	Did not participate						
(Rwanda) 2015	Did not participate						
(Rwanda) 2016	Did not participate						
(Rwanda) 2017	Did not participate						
(Rwanda) 2018	Did not participate						
(Rwanda) 2019	Did not participate						
(Rwanda) 2021	Runners-up	2/5	5	4	1	0	0
(Rwanda) 2022	Did not participate						
(Rwanda) 2023	Did not participate						
(Rwanda) 2024	Did not participate						
(Rwanda) 2025	Did not participate						
Total	1/11	0 Title	5	4	1	0	0

== Records and statistics ==
International Match Summary — Namibia Women

Last updated 14 November 2026

Playing Record
Format	M	W	L	T	NR	Inaugural Match
Twenty20 Internationals	131	70	59	1	1	20 August 2018

=== Twenty20 International ===
- Highest team total: 228/1 v Sierra Leone, 3 September 2025 at High Performance Oval, Windhoek.
- Highest individual score: 93*, Sune Wittmann v Botswana, 8 June 2021 at Gahanga International Cricket Stadium, Kigali.
- Best individual bowling figures: 5/6, Wilka Mwatile v Cameroon, 14 September 2021 at Botswana Cricket Association Oval 2, Gaborone.

Most WT20I runs for Namibia Women

Player	Runs	Average	Career span
Yasmeen Khan	2,052	21.60	2018–2026
Sune Wittmann	2,015	19.37	2019–2026
Kayleen Green	1,477	16.97	2018–2026
Wilka Mwatile	1,059	13.75	2018–2026
Jurriene Diergaardt	1,036	12.95	2018–2026

Most WT20I wickets for Namibia Women

Player	Wickets	Average	Career span
Wilka Mwatile	99	16.81	2018–2026
Kayleen Green	88	15.44	2018–2026
Victoria Hamunyela	73	15.15	2018–2026
Jurriene Diergaardt	66	20.19	2018–2026
Sylvia Shihepo	57	15.00	2018–2026

T20I record versus other nations

Records complete to T20I #3069. Last updated 14 November 2026.

Opponent	M	W	L	T	NR	First match	First win
ICC Full members
Bangladesh	1	0	1	0	0	22 January 2026	
Ireland	2	0	2	0	0	31 August 2019	
Zimbabwe	17	4	13	0	0	5 January 2019	20 April 2022
ICC Associate members
Botswana	7	7	0	0	0	24 August 2018	24 August 2018
Cameroon	1	1	0	0	0	14 September 2021	14 September 2021
China	1	1	0	0	0	5 December 2024	5 December 2024
Germany	3	3	0	0	0	2 July 2022	2 July 2022
Hong Kong	7	6	1	0	0	25 April 2023	25 April 2023
Kenya	3	2	1	0	0	5 May 2019	5 May 2019
Lesotho	1	1	0	0	0	23 August 2018	23 August 2018
Malawi	1	1	0	0	0	20 August 2018	20 August 2018
Malaysia	3	3	0	0	0	10 December 2024	10 December 2024
Mozambique	1	1	0	0	0	23 August 2018	23 August 2018
Netherlands	7	2	5	0	0	3 September 2019	28 June 2022
Nepal	2	2	0	0	0	8 March 2025	8 March 2025
Nigeria	6	5	1	0	0	6 June 2021	6 June 2021
Papua New Guinea	3	0	3	0	0	15 November 2025	15 November 2025
Rwanda	4	3	1	0	0	7 June 2021	7 June 2021
Scotland	3	0	3	0	0	5 September 2019	
Sierra Leone	5	5	0	0	0	21 August 2018	21 August 2018
Tanzania	7	4	2	0	1	17 September 2021	17 September 2021
Thailand	5	0	5	0	0	1 September 2019	
Uganda	24	12	11	1	0	6 May 2019	6 May 2019
United Arab Emirates	12	6	6	0	0	27 April 2023	27 April 2023
United States	5	1	4	0	0	7 September 2019	7 November 2026

== Current squad ==
This lists all the players who played for Namibia in the past 12 months or were named in the most recent squad.

Name	Age	Batting style	Bowling style	Notes
Batters
Yasmeen Khan	27	Right-handed	-	Vice-captain
Arrasta Diergaardt	26	Right-handed	Right-arm medium	
Edelle van Zyl	22	Right-handed		
Bianca Manuel	24	Right-handed		
All-rounders
Wilka Mwatile	26	Right-handed	Right-arm medium	
Kayleen Green	28	Right-handed	Right-arm off break	
Sylvia Shihepo	25	Right-handed	Right-arm medium	
Sune Wittmann	31	Right-handed	Right-arm medium	Captain
Mekelaye Mwatile	21	Right-handed	Slow left-arm unorthodox	
Wicket-keeper
Merczerly Gorases	21	Right-handed		
Spin Bowler
Victoria Hamunyela	23	Right-handed	Right-arm off break	
Pace Bowlers
Irene van Zyl	41	Right-handed	Right-arm medium	
Naomi Benjamin	21	Right-handed	Right-arm medium	
Saima Tuhadeleni	21	Right-handed	Right-arm medium	

Updated as on 14 September 2024

== See also ==
- List of Namibia women Twenty20 International cricketers
