= 2023 Women's T20 World Cup Africa Qualifier =

International cricket tournament

The 2023 ICC Women's T20 World Cup Africa Qualifier was a cricket tournament that formed part of the qualification process for the 2024 ICC Women's T20 World Cup. The first stage of the tournament was Division Two, which featured eight teams and was held in Botswana in September 2023.

Both finalists of the Division Two tournament, Botswana and Kenya, advanced to Division One, by virtue of reaching the final. Kenya defeated Botswana by 9 wickets in the final.

Division One featured six seeded teams and was played in Uganda in December 2023.

In Division One, Zimbabwe and Uganda reached the final and therefore qualified for the 2024 ICC Women's T20 World Cup Qualifier. Zimbabwe defeated Uganda in the final. Zimbabwe's Modester Mupachikwa and Precious Marange were the top run scorer and top wicket taker, respectively, in Division One.

== Teams ==
Division Two	Division One
Botswana; Cameroon; Eswatini; Kenya; Lesotho; Malawi; Mozambique; Sierra Leone	Botswana; Kenya; Namibia; Nigeria; Rwanda; Tanzania; Uganda; Zimbabwe

== Division Two ==
2023 ICC Women's T20 World Cup Africa Qualifier Division Two
- Dates: 2 – 8 September 2023
- Administrator: International Cricket Council
- Cricket format: Twenty20 International
- Tournament format(s): Group round-robin and playoffs
- Host: Botswana
- Champions: Kenya
- Runners-up: Botswana
- Participants: 8
- Matches: 16
- Most runs: (Kenya) Queentor Abel (238)
- Most wickets: (Kenya) Queentor Abel (13)

=== Squads ===
The following squads were named ahead of the tournament.

Botswana	Cameroon	Eswatini	Kenya
Laura Mophakedi (c, wk); Botho Freeman; Oratile Kgeresi; Bontle Madimabe (wk); Pako Mapotsane; Goabilwe Matome; Amantle Mokgotlhe; Shameelah Mosweu; Wendy Moutswi; Botsogo Mpedi; Merapelo Phiase; Florence Samanyika; Goitseone Setshwane; Tuelo Shadrack	Michelle Ekani (c, wk); Sonita Akenji; Marguerite Bessala; Beltine Diom; Maeva Douma; Elsa Kana; Tchouabo Leslie; Clemence Manidom; Bernadette Mbida; Cynerah Mboe; Sandra Nono; Olive Ranedoumoun; Madaleine Sissako; Brenda Waluma	Ntombizonke Mkhatshwa (c); Mbali Dlamini (vc); Dumsile Dlamini; Tibusiso Dlamini; Winile Ginindza; Nothando Mabila; Nokulunga Mabuza; Tenele Malinga; Lindokuhle Mamba; Nkosingiphile Mamba; Ntombizodwa Mkhatshwa (wk); Abahle Nyirenda; Nokwethu Simelane; Lihle Thobela	Esther Wachira (c); Melvin Khagoitsa (vc); Queentor Abel; Josephine Abwom; Mercy Ahono; Lavendah Idambo; Marion Juma; Kreeshna Mehta; Charity Muthoni (wk); Mary Mwangi (wk); Daisy Njoroge; Flavia Odhiambo; Kelvia Ogola; Judith Ogolla; Venasa Ooko
Lesotho	Malawi	Mozambique	Sierra Leone
Maneo Nyabela (c); Mosa Tsemane (vc); Khahliso Damane; Thandi Kobeli; Ret'sepile Limema; Makopano Mabathoana; Kananelo Mabitle; Thato Mahe; Karabo Mohale; Nana Mokhachane; Mamothepane Mokoatsela; Kananelo Molapo; Paballo Pheko (wk); Kananelo Phohlo (wk)	Vanessa Phiri (c); Sugeni Kananji (vc); Allinafe Alfonso; Sophina Chinawa; Ketrina Chingaipe; Lidia Dimba; Nellie Gamaliyele; Mercy Kudimba (wk); Triphonia Luka; Mary Mabvuka (wk); Febbe Malefula; Lucy Malino; Praise Maziya; Tadala Mpandakwaya	Palmira Cuinica (c, wk); Isabel Chuma; Dalciesia Duvane; Raquel Duvane (wk); Isabel Mabunda; Christina Magaia; Alda Mangue; Olga Matsolo; Regina Mazumba; Abelina Moiane; Irene Mulhovo; Amelia Mundundo; Angelica Salomao; Fernanda Zavala	Fatmata Parkinson (c); Fatu Pessima (vc); Celina Bull; Fatu Conteh; Alice Fillie; Ann Marie Kamara; Emma Kamara; Zainab Kamara (wk); Isatu Koroma; Janet Kowa; Isha Quee; Hassanatu Sawaneh; Hussainatu Sawanneh; Marie Turay; Ramatu Turay (wk)

=== Group A ===
==== Points table ====
Pos	Team	Pld	W	L	NR	Pts	NRR	Qualification
1	Kenya	3	3	0	0	6	6.719	Advanced to the play-offs
2	Botswana	3	2	1	0	4	1.117	Advanced to the play-offs
3	Malawi	3	1	2	0	2	1.445	
4	Lesotho	3	0	3	0	0	−8.617	

Source: ESPNcricinfo

==== Fixtures ====
2 September 2023
09:30
Scorecard

Kenya; 164/1 (20 overs)	v	Botswana; 53 (20 overs)
Queentor Abel 71 (46); Pako Mapotsane 1/28 (4 overs)		Goabilwe Matome 24* (38); Queentor Abel 4/7 (4 overs)

Kenya won by 111 runs
Botswana Cricket Association Oval 1, Gaborone
Umpires: Lauren Agenbag (SA) and Sarah Dambanevana (Zim)
Player of the match: Queentor Abel (Ken)

- Kenya won the toss and elected to bat.

2 September 2023
09:30
Scorecard

Malawi; 189/5 (20 overs)	v	Lesotho; 53 (17.3 overs)
Lidia Dimba 74* (49); Ret'sepile Limema 1/18 (3 overs)		Kananelo Molapo 11 (19); Vanessa Phiri 4/9 (4 overs)

Malawi won by 136 runs
Botswana Cricket Association Oval 2, Gaborone
Umpires: Kerrin Klaaste (SA) and Justine Muzungu (Bot)
Player of the match: Lidia Dimba (Mwi)

- Lesotho won the toss and elected to field.
- Ret'sepile Limema, Makopano Mabathoana, Thato Mahe, Nana Mokhachane, Mamothepane Mokoatsela, Kananelo Molapo, Maneo Nyabela, Kananelo Phohlo, Mosa Tsemane (Les), Sophina Chinawa, Ketrina Chingaipe, Lidia Dimba, Sugeni Kananji, Mercy Kudimba, Febbe Malefula and Lucy Malino (Mwi) all made their T20I debuts.

3 September 2023
09:30
Scorecard

Malawi; 62/8 (20 overs)	v	Kenya; 63/3 (10.5 overs)
Sophina Chinawa 23 (25); Lavendah Idambo 3/9 (4 overs)		Queentor Abel 30 (28); Ketrina Chingaipe 1/11 (3 overs)

Kenya won by 7 wickets
Botswana Cricket Association Oval 1, Gaborone
Umpires: Kerrin Klaaste (SA) and Justine Muzungu (Bot)
Player of the match: Lavendah Idambo (Ken)

- Malawi won the toss and elected to bat.

3 September 2023
09:30
Scorecard

Botswana; 204/4 (20 overs)	v	Lesotho; 31 (9 overs)
Shameelah Mosweu 86* (63); Makopano Mabathoana 2/30 (3 overs)		Thato Mahe 21 (19); Goabilwe Matome 6/1 (3 overs)

Botswana won by 173 runs
Botswana Cricket Association Oval 2, Gaborone
Umpires: Lauren Agenbag (SA) and Forster Mutizwa (Zim)
Player of the match: Shameelah Mosweu (Bot)

- Botswana won the toss and elected to bat.
- Wendy Moutswi and Goitseone Setshwane (Bot) both made their T20I debuts.
- Goabilwe Matome (Bot) took her first five-wicket haul in T20Is.

5 September 2023
13:50
Scorecard

Botswana; 124/4 (20 overs)	v	Malawi; 119/8 (20 overs)
Goabilwe Matome 40* (34); Ketrina Chingaipe 2/1 (4 overs)		Sugeni Kananji 42 (27); Goabilwe Matome 3/17 (4 overs)

Botswana won by 5 runs
Botswana Cricket Association Oval 1, Gaborone
Umpires: Lauren Agenbag (SA) and Isaac Oyieko (Ken)
Player of the match: Goabilwe Matome (Bot)

- Malawi won the toss and elected to field.

5 September 2023
13:50
Scorecard

Kenya; 234/1 (20 overs)	v	Lesotho; 26 (13 overs)
Queentor Abel 109 (52); Thandi Kobeli 1/38 (4 overs)		Khahliso Damane 10 (15); Lavendah Idambo 4/14 (4 overs)

Kenya won by 208 runs
Botswana Cricket Association Oval 2, Gaborone
Umpires: Sarah Dambanevana (Zim) and Justine Muzungu (Bot)
Player of the match: Queentor Abel (Ken)

- Kenya won the toss and elected to bat.
- Kreeshna Mehta, Judith Ogolla (Ken) and Khahliso Damane (Les) all made their T20I debuts.
- Queentor Abel became the first player for Kenya to score a century in women's T20Is.

=== Group B ===
==== Points table ====
Pos	Team	Pld	W	L	NR	Pts	NRR	Qualification
1	Sierra Leone	3	3	0	0	6	6.195	Advanced to the play-offs
2	Cameroon	3	2	1	0	4	0.587	Advanced to the play-offs
3	Mozambique	3	1	2	0	2	0.140	
4	Eswatini	3	0	3	0	0	−5.183	

Source: ESPNcricinfo

==== Fixtures ====
2 September 2023
13:50
Scorecard

Mozambique; 150/4 (20 overs)	v	Eswatini; 48 (7.3 overs)
Palmira Cuinica 45 (66); Ntombizonke Mkhatshwa 3/24 (4 overs)		Nothando Mabila 17 (13); Regina Mazumba 2/1 (0.3 overs)

Mozambique won by 102 runs
Botswana Cricket Association Oval 1, Gaborone
Umpires: Sarah Dambanevana (Zim) and Isaac Oyieko (Ken)
Player of the match: Palmira Cuinica (Moz)

- Eswatini won the toss and elected to field.
- Tibusiso Dlamini, Lindokuhle Mamba, Nokwethu Simelane (Esw) and Regina Mazumba (Moz) all made their T20I debuts.

2 September 2023
13:50
Scorecard

Cameroon; 40 (13.5 overs)	v	Sierra Leone; 42/3 (5.5 overs)
Sonita Akenji 8* (10); Alice Fillie 4/11 (3 overs)		Marie Turay 20* (17)

Sierre Leone won by 7 wickets
Botswana Cricket Association Oval 2, Gaborone
Umpires: Forster Mutizwa (Zim) and Percival Sizara (Zim)
Player of the match: Alice Fillie (Sle)

- Sierra Leone won the toss and elected to field.

3 September 2023
13:50
Scorecard

Mozambique; 55 (16.3 overs)	v	Sierra Leone; 56/0 (7.1 overs)
Irene Mulhovo 12 (30); Janet Kowa 3/7 (4 overs)		Emma Kamara 31* (17)

Sierra Leone won by 10 wickets
Botswana Cricket Association Oval 1, Gaborone
Umpires: Isaac Oyieko (Ken) and Percival Sizara (Zim)
Player of the match: Emma Kamara (Sle)

- Sierra Leone won the toss and elected to field.

3 September 2023
13:50
Scorecard

Cameroon; 125/4 (20 overs)	v	Eswatini; 63 (12.3 overs)
Madaleine Sissako 57 (62); Winile Ginindza 2/27 (4 overs)		Mbali Dlamini 17 (14); Clemence Manidom 3/10 (3.3 overs)

Cameroon won by 62 runs
Botswana Cricket Association Oval 2, Gaborone
Umpires: Sarah Dambanevana (Zim) and Justine Muzungu (Bot)
Player of the match: Madaleine Sissako (Cmr)

- Eswatini won the toss and elected to field.
- Abahle Nyirenda (Esw) made her T20I debut.

5 September 2023
09:30
Scorecard

Cameroon; 115/6 (20 overs)	v	Mozambique; 82 (16.5 overs)
Madaleine Sissako 27 (30); Christina Magaia 4/24 (4 overs)		Fernanda Zavala 21 (20); Tchouabo Leslie 3/13 (3.5 overs)

Cameroon won by 33 runs
Botswana Cricket Association Oval 1, Gaborone
Umpires: Elizabeth French (Sle) and Forster Mutizwa (Zim)
Player of the match: Madaleine Sissako (Cmr)

- Mozambique won the toss and elected to field.

5 September 2023
09:30
Scorecard

Sierra Leone; 173/6 (20 overs)	v	Eswatini; 26 (14.4 overs)
Ann Marie Kamara 51 (34); Nokwethu Simelane 1/12 (1 over)		Ntombizonke Mkhatshwa 6 (8); Ann Marie Kamara 2/1 (3 overs)

Sierra Leone won by 147 runs
Botswana Cricket Association Oval 2, Gaborone
Umpires: Kerrin Klaaste (SA) and Percival Sizara (Zim)
Player of the match: Ann Marie Kamara (Sle)

- Sierra Leone won the toss and elected to bat.
- Ramatu Turay (Sle) made her T20I debut.

=== Play-offs ===
==== Bracket ====
Semi-finals
A2	Botswana	131/7 (20)
B1	Sierra Leone	114/5 (20)
A1	Kenya	156/5 (20)
B2	Cameroon	38 (14.4)

Final
A2	Botswana	52 (14.2)
A1	Kenya	53/1 (8.1)
3rd place play-off
B2	Cameroon	68/6 (20)
B1	Sierra Leone	72/3 (9.5)

==== Semi-finals ====
6 September 2023
09:30
Scorecard

Botswana; 131/7 (20 overs)	v	Sierra Leone; 114/5 (20 overs)
Florence Samanyika 22 (33); Alice Fillie 2/25 (4 overs)		Emma Kamara 25 (23); Shameelah Mosweu 1/14 (4 overs)

Botswana won by 17 runs
Botswana Cricket Association Oval 1, Gaborone
Umpires: Lauren Agenbag (SA) and Sarah Dambanevana (Zim)
Player of the match: Shameelah Mosweu (Bot)

- Botswana won the toss and elected to bat.

6 September 2023
13:50
Scorecard

Kenya; 156/5 (20 overs)	v	Cameroon; 38 (14.4 overs)
Esther Wachira 51 (46); Bernadette Mbida 2/20 (2 overs)		Olive Ranedoumoun 11 (16); Queentor Abel 5/5 (5 overs)

Kenya won by 118 runs
Botswana Cricket Association Oval 1, Gaborone
Umpires: Kerrin Klaaste (SA) and Forster Mutizwa (Zim)
Player of the match: Queentor Abel (Ken)

- Kenya won the toss and elected to bat.

==== 3rd place play-off ====
8 September 2023
09:30
Scorecard

Cameroon; 68/6 (20 overs)	v	Sierra Leone; 72/3 (9.5 overs)
Marguerite Bessala 16* (19); Janet Kowa 2/8 (4 overs)		Zainab Kamara 37* (25); Sonita Akenji 1/15 (2 overs)

Sierra Leone won by 7 wickets
Botswana Cricket Association Oval 1, Gaborone
Umpires: Sarah Dambanevana (Zim) and Percival Sizara (Zim)
Player of the match: Zainab Kamara (Sle)

- Cameroon won the toss and elected to bat.

==== Final ====
8 September 2023
13:50
Scorecard

Botswana; 52 (14.2 overs)	v	Kenya; 53/1 (8.1 overs)
Florence Samanyika 22 (23); Flavia Odhiambo 4/10 (3.2 overs)		Daisy Njoroge 26* (24); Goabilwe Matome 1/19 (4 overs)

Kenya won by 9 wickets
Botswana Cricket Association Oval 1, Gaborone
Umpires: Lauren Agenbag (SA) and Forster Mutizwa (Zim)
Player of the match: Flavia Odhiambo (Ken)

- Botswana won the toss and elected to bat.

== Division One ==
2023 ICC Women's T20 World Cup Africa Qualifier Division One
- Dates: 9 – 17 December 2023
- Administrator: International Cricket Council
- Cricket format: Twenty20 International
- Host: Uganda
- Champions: Zimbabwe
- Runners-up: Uganda
- Participants: 8
- Matches: 16
- Most runs: (Zimbabwe) Modester Mupachikwa (131)
- Most wickets: (Zimbabwe) Precious Marange (13)

=== Squads ===
Botswana	Kenya	Namibia	Nigeria
Laura Mophakedi (c, wk); Shameelah Mosweu (vc); Onneile Keitsemang; Oratile Kgeresi; Bontle Madimabe (wk); Pako Mapotsane; Goabilwe Matome; Tebogo Moitoi; Amantle Mokgotlhe; Tebogo Motlhabaphuti; Wendy Moutswi; Merapelo Phiase; Florence Samanyika; Tuelo Shadrack	Esther Wachira (c); Queentor Abel; Josephine Abwom; Lavendah Idambo; Melvin Khagoitsa; Kreeshna Mehta; Charity Muthoni (wk); Mary Mwangi (wk); Jemimah Ndanu; Flavia Odhiambo; Kelvia Ogola; Judith Ogolla; Venasa Ooko; Mercy Sifuna	Irene van Zyl (c); Naomi Benjamin; Jurriene Diergaardt; Merczerly Gorases; Kayleen Green; Victoria Hamunyela; Yasmeen Khan (wk); Bianca Manuel; Mekeleya Mwatile; Sylvia Shihepo; Saima Tuhadeleni; Sune Wittmann; Edelle van Zyl	Blessing Etim (c); Rukayat Abdulrasak; Adeshola Adekunle; Peculiar Agboya; Christabel Chukwuonye; Favour Eseigbe; Sarah Etim (wk); Victory Igbinedion; Abigail Igbobie (wk); Lucky Piety; Rachael Samson; Esther Sandy; Salome Sunday; Lillian Udeh
Rwanda	Tanzania	Uganda	Zimbabwe
Marie Bimenyimana (c); Alice Ikuzwe; Flora Irakoze; Rosine Irera; Gisele Ishimwe; Henriette Ishimwe; Immaculee Muhawenimana; Belise Murekatete; Zulufat Mutoniwase; Shakila Niyomuhoza; Josiane Nyirankundineza; Marie Tumukunde; Clarisse Uwase; Merveille Uwase (wk)	Neema Pius (c); Perice Kamunya (vc); Saum Borakambi; Sophia Jerome; Fatuma Kibasu; Sheila Kizito; Aisha Mohamed; Shufaa Mohamedi (wk); Saum Mtae; Hudaa Omary; Agnes Qwele; Monica Pascal; Mwajabu Salum; Mwanamvua Ushanga	Concy Aweko (c); Janet Mbabazi (vc); Sarah Akiteng; Prosscovia Alako; Irene Alumo; Lorna Anyait; Evelyn Anyipo; Malisa Ariokot; Kevin Awino; Esther Iloku; Patricia Malemikia; Rita Musamali; Immaculate Nakisuuyi; Stephani Nampiina	Mary-Anne Musonda (c); Francisca Chipare; Chiedza Dhururu (wk); Nyasha Gwanzura; Lindokuhle Mabhero; Precious Marange; Audrey Mazvishaya; Chipo Mugeri-Tiripano; Modester Mupachikwa (wk); Ashley Ndiraya; Kelis Ndhlovu; Josephine Nkomo; Nomvelo Sibanda; Loreen Tshuma

=== Group A ===
==== Points table ====
Pos	Team	Pld	W	L	NR	Pts	NRR	Qualification
1	Zimbabwe	3	3	0	0	6	3.524	Advanced to the play-offs
2	Tanzania	3	2	1	0	4	0.779	Advanced to the play-offs
3	Kenya	3	1	2	0	2	−1.491	
4	Botswana	3	0	3	0	0	−4.530	

Source: ESPNcricinfo

==== Fixtures ====
9 December 2023
09:30
Scorecard

Zimbabwe; 111/9 (20 overs)	v	Kenya; 49 (15.4 overs)
Chipo Mugeri-Tiripano 31 (17); Queentor Abel 2/15 (4 overs)		Charity Muthoni 10 (26); Loreen Tshuma 3/14 (4 overs)

Zimbabwe won by 62 runs
Entebbe Cricket Oval, Entebbe
Umpires: Nimali Perera (SL) and Dedunu Silva (SL)
Player of the match: Josephine Nkomo (Zim)

- Kenya won the toss and elected to field.
- Jemimah Ndanu (Ken) and Lindokuhle Mabhero (Zim) both made their T20I debuts.

9 December 2023
13:50
Scorecard

Botswana; 75 (19.2 overs)	v	Tanzania; 76/0 (10.2 overs)
Shameelah Mosweu 15 (24); Perice Kamunya 2/10 (4 overs)		Saum Mtae 38* (40)

Tanzania won by 10 wickets
Entebbe Cricket Oval, Entebbe
Umpires: Sarah Dambanevana (Zim) and Claus Schumacher (Nam)
Player of the match: Saum Mtae (Tan)

- Botswana won the toss and elected to bat.

11 December 2023
09:30
Scorecard

Kenya; 35/3 (8 overs)	v	Tanzania; 42/3 (6.3 overs)
Melvin Khagoitsa 12 (8); Perice Kamunya 1/7 (3 overs)		Hudaa Omary 23* (15); Melvin Khagoitsa 2/8 (2 overs)

Tanzania won by 7 wickets (DLS method)
Entebbe Cricket Oval, Entebbe
Umpires: Sarah Dambanevana (Zim) and Nimali Perera (SL)
Player of the match: Hudaa Omary (Tan)

- Tanzania won the toss and elected to bowl.
- Tanzania were set a revised target of 42 runs in 8 overs due to rain.

11 December 2023
13:50
Scorecard

Zimbabwe; 162/5 (20 overs)	v	Botswana; 47 (17.4 overs)
Modester Mupachikwa 47* (44); Goabilwe Matome 3/28 (4 overs)		Shameelah Mosweu 15 (24); Loreen Tshuma 3/6 (4 overs)

Zimbabwe won by 115 runs
Entebbe Cricket Oval, Entebbe
Umpires: Habib Enesi (Nga) and Dedunu Silva (SL)
Player of the match: Kelis Ndhlovu (Zim)

- Zimbabwe won the toss and elected to bat.

13 December 2023
09:30
Scorecard

Botswana; 52/8 (20 overs)	v	Kenya; 34/1 (6 overs)
Pako Mapotsane 11 (18); Esther Wachira 3/6 (4 overs)		Queentor Abel 21* (14); Tuelo Shadrack 1/9 (2 overs)

Kenya won by 20 runs (DLS method)
Entebbe Cricket Oval, Entebbe
Umpires: Simon Kintu (Uga) and Nimali Perera (SL)
Player of the match: Queentor Abel (Ken)

- Kenya won the toss and elected to field.
- No further play was possible due to rain.

13 December 2023
13:50
Scorecard

Tanzania; 82 (19.5 overs)	v	Zimbabwe; 84/1 (15 overs)
Fatuma Kibasu 22 (37); Precious Marange 3/13 (4 overs)		Mary-Anne Musonda 33 (27); Mwanamvua Ushanga 1/11 (2 overs)

Zimbabwe won by 9 wickets
Entebbe Cricket Oval, Entebbe
Umpires: Patric Makumbi (Uga) and Claus Schumacher (Nam)
Player of the match: Precious Marange (Zim)

- Zimbabwe won the toss and elected to field.

=== Group B ===
==== Points table ====
Pos	Team	Pld	W	L	NR	Pts	NRR	Qualification
1	Uganda	3	3	0	0	6	0.960	Advanced to the play-offs
2	Namibia	3	2	1	0	4	0.204	Advanced to the play-offs
3	Nigeria	3	1	2	0	2	−0.687	
4	Rwanda	3	0	3	0	0	−0.726	

Source: ESPNcricinfo

==== Fixtures ====
10 December 2023
09:30
Scorecard

Namibia; 122/2 (20 overs)	v	Nigeria; 113/7 (20 overs)
Yasmeen Khan 59 (49); Lucky Piety 1/17 (3 overs)		Lucky Piety 43* (49); Sylvia Shihepo 2/26 (3 overs)

Namibia won by 9 runs
Entebbe Cricket Oval, Entebbe
Umpires: Simon Kintu (Uga) and Patric Makumbi (Uga)
Player of the match: Yasmeen Khan (Nam)

- Nigeria won the toss and elected to field.
- Christabel Chukwuonye (Nga) made her T20I debut.

10 December 2023
13:50
Scorecard

Rwanda; 87/5 (20 overs)	v	Uganda; 89/4 (16 overs)
Merveille Uwase 35 (35); Janet Mbabazi 3/14 (4 overs)		Janet Mbabazi 32 (37); Marie Tumukunde 1/7 (1 over)

Uganda won by 6 wickets
Entebbe Cricket Oval, Entebbe
Umpires: Habib Enesi (Nga) and Percival Sizara (Zim)
Player of the match: Janet Mbabazi (Uga)

- Uganda won the toss and elected to field.
- Marie Tumukunde (Rwa) made her T20I debut.

12 December 2023
09:30
Scorecard

Rwanda; 88/9 (20 overs)	v	Nigeria; 49/4 (10.3 overs)
Clarisse Uwase 18 (24); Peculiar Agboya 3/13 (4 overs)		Peculiar Agboya 19 (17); Rosine Irera 2/4 (3 overs)

Nigeria won by 3 runs (DLS method)
Entebbe Cricket Oval, Entebbe
Umpires: Patric Makumbi (Uga) and Percival Sizara (Zim)
Player of the match: Peculiar Agboya (Nga)

- Rwanda won the toss and elected to bat.
- No further play was possible due to rain.
- Victory Igbinedion (Nga) made her T20I debut.

12 December 2023
13:50
Scorecard

Namibia; 92 (19.5 overs)	v	Uganda; 93/6 (18.4 overs)
Kayleen Green 22 (29); Concy Aweko 3/16 (4 overs)		Rita Musamali 16 (20); Victoria Hamunyela 3/11 (4 overs)

Uganda won by 4 wickets
Entebbe Cricket Oval, Entebbe
Umpires: Sarah Dambanevana (Zim) and Habib Enesi (Nga)
Player of the match: Concy Aweko (Uga)

- Uganda won the toss and elected to field.

14 December 2023
09:30
Scorecard

Namibia; 102/7 (20 overs)	v	Rwanda; 91/8 (20 overs)
Jurriene Diergaardt 22* (22); Belise Murekatete 3/18 (4 overs)		Gisele Ishimwe 36 (40); Naomi Benjamin 2/13 (4 overs)

Namibia won by 11 runs
Entebbe Cricket Oval, Entebbe
Umpires: Simon Kintu (Uga) and Percival Sizara (Zim)
Player of the match: Merczerly Gorases (Nam)

- Rwanda won the toss and elected to field.
- Shakila Niyomuhoza (Rwa) made her T20I debut.

14 December 2023
13:50
Scorecard

Nigeria; 63/9 (20 overs)	v	Uganda; 66/4 (15 overs)
Blessing Etim 24 (42); Concy Aweko 3/16 (4 overs)		Prosscovia Alako 23 (38); Adeshola Adekunle 2/13 (3 overs)

Uganda won by 6 wickets
Entebbe Cricket Oval, Entebbe
Umpires: Claus Schumacher (Nam) and Dedunu Silva (SL)
Player of the match: Concy Aweko (Uga)

- Uganda won the toss and elected to field.

=== Play-offs ===
==== Bracket ====
Semi-finals
A1	Zimbabwe	150/6 (20)
B2	Namibia	64 (16.2)
A2	Tanzania	89 (19.2)
B1	Uganda	99/4 (20)

Final
Zimbabwe	85/4 (14.4)
Uganda	79 (20)
3rd place play-off
Namibia
Tanzania

==== Semi-finals ====
16 December 2023
09:30
Scorecard

Zimbabwe; 150/6 (20 overs)	v	Namibia; 64 (16.2 overs)
Modester Mupachikwa 33 (37); Mekeleya Mwatile 3/17 (4 overs)		Edelle van Zyl 23 (20); Precious Marange 3/9 (4 overs)

Zimbabwe won by 86 runs
Entebbe Cricket Oval, Entebbe
Umpires: Habib Enesi (Nga) and Dedunu Silva (SL)
Player of the match: Precious Marange (Zim)

- Namibia won the toss and elected to field.
- Zimbabwe qualify for 2024 ICC Women's T20 World Cup Qualifier.

16 December 2023
13:50
Scorecard

Uganda; 99/4 (20 overs)	v	Tanzania; 89 (19.2 overs)
Stephani Nampiina 51 (53); Perice Kamunya 2/10 (4 overs)		Saum Mtae 35 (40); Rita Musamali 3/11 (3 overs)

Uganda won by 10 runs
Entebbe Cricket Oval, Entebbe
Umpires: Nimali Perera (SL) and Percival Sizara (Zim)
Player of the match: Rita Musamali (Uga)

- Tanzania won the toss and elected to field.
- Uganda qualify for 2024 ICC Women's T20 World Cup Qualifier.

==== 3rd place play-off ====
17 December 2023
09:30
Scorecard

Namibia	v	Tanzania

No result
Entebbe Cricket Oval, Entebbe
Umpires: Sarah Dambanevana (Zim) and Dedunu Silva (SL)

- Namibia won the toss and elected to bat.
- No play was possible due to rain.

==== Final ====
17 December 2023
13:50
Scorecard

Uganda; 79 (20 overs)	v	Zimbabwe; 85/4 (14.4 overs)
Stephani Nampiina 26 (26); Precious Marange 5/7 (4 overs)		Modester Mupachikwa 22 (30); Rita Musamali 2/7 (2 overs)

Zimbabwe won by 6 wickets
Entebbe Cricket Oval, Entebbe
Umpires: Nimali Perera (SL) and Claus Schumacher (Nam)
Player of the match: Precious Marange (Zim)

- Zimbabwe won the toss and elected to field.
- Precious Marange (Zim) took her first hat-trick in T20Is.
