= 2021 Women's T20 World Cup Africa Qualifier =

International cricket tournament

2021 ICC Women's T20 World Cup Africa Qualifier
- Dates: 9 – 19 September 2021
- Administrator: Africa Cricket Association
- Cricket format: Twenty20 International
- Tournament format(s): Group round-robin and playoffs
- Host: Botswana
- Champions: Zimbabwe
- Runners-up: Namibia
- Participants: 11
- Matches: 29
- Most runs: (Tanzania) Fatuma Kibasu (280)
- Most wickets: (Zimbabwe) Loryn Phiri (16)

The 2021 ICC Women's T20 World Cup Africa Qualifier was a cricket tournament that was played in Botswana in September 2021. The matches were played as Twenty20 Internationals (T20Is), with the top team progressing to the 2022 ICC Women's T20 World Cup Qualifier tournament. Botswana, Cameroon and Eswatini made their debut at an ICC women's event. Malawi were originally named as a participants in the tournament, but they were replaced by Eswatini.

The tournament was originally scheduled to take place in October 2021, but was brought forward to ease fixture congestion. In July 2021, the dates for the Africa Qualifier were confirmed. The fixtures were reshuffled shortly before the tournament, following a member of the Cameroon squad recording a positive COVID-19 test. The entire squad was placed into isolation until they returned negative tests.

During Cameroon's opening match against Uganda, Maeva Douma dismissed four batters by 'Mankading' as they backed up at the non-striker's end. Namibia progressed to the semi-finals by winning all of their games to finish as winners of group B. Uganda joined them in the semi-finals as runners-up in the group. Zimbabwe topped group A with a 100% record to secure a semi-final against Uganda. Zimbabwe and Namibia won their respective semi-finals to advance to the final of the tournament. In the final, Zimbabwe beat Namibia by 13 runs to advance to the World Twenty20 Qualifier tournament, with Tanzania beating Uganda by nine wickets in the third place play-off match.

== Squads ==
The following teams and squads were named for the tournament:

Botswana	Cameroon	Eswatini	Mozambique	Namibia	Nigeria
Laura Mophakedi (c); Florence Samanyika (vc); Olebogeng Batisani; Kesego Inakale; Onneile Keitsemang; Jacqueline Kgang; Thandiwe Legabile; Bontle Madimabe (wk); Precious Modimo; Thapelo Modise; Amantle Mokgotlhe; Collin Mokibelo; Shameelah Mosweu; Botsogo Mpedi; Tuelo Shadrack	Michelle Ekani (c); Odile Agbor; Marguerite Bessala; Maeva Douma; Akago Eliane; Elsa Kana; Nantia Kenfack; Tchouabo Leslie; Clemence Manidom; Bernadette Mbida; Cynerah Mboe; Jeanne Ngono; Madeleine Sissako; Michel Tedjui	Ntombizini Gwebu (c); Dumsile Dlamini; Mbali Dlamini; Phindo Dlamini; Winile Ginindza; Nombuso Khumalo; Nothando Mabila; Nokulunga Mabuza; Nomvuyo Magagula; Tenele Malinga; Khulani Maseko; Mawilsia May; Welile Mazibuka; Ntombizodwa Mkhatshwa; Ntombizonke Mkhatshwa	Olga Matsolo (c); Tania Chiracheque; Isabel Chuma; Alcinda Cossa; Palmira Cuinica (wk); Sheila Guambe; Rosalia Hoiong; Flora Macaringue; Cristina Magaia; Alda Mangue; Paula Mazuze; Ofelia Moiane; Atalia Monjane; Cecelia Murrombe; Helena Ponja; Jessica Sainda; Dalmira Tivane	Irene van Zyl (c); Jurriene Diergaardt; Kayleen Green (wk); Mezerly Gorases; Victoria Hamunyela; Yasmeen Khan (wk); Mekelaye Mwatile; Wilka Mwatile; Sylvia Shihepo; Namusha Shiomwenyo; Adri van der Merwe; Kaylee van Wyk; Edelle van Zyl; Sune Wittmann	Blessing Etim (c); Kehinde Abdulquadri (wk); Taiwo Abdulquadri; Omonye Asika; George Chinyenum; Mary Desmond; Joy Efosa; Abigail Igbobie (wk); Miracle Imimole; Piety Lucky; Agatha Obulor; Racheal Samson; Esther Sandy; Salome Sunday
Rwanda	Sierra Leone	Tanzania	Uganda	Zimbabwe	
Marie Bimenyimana (c); Sifa Ingabire; Alice Ikuzwe; Flora Irakoze (wk); Gisele Ishimwe; Henriette Ishimwe; Immaculee Muhawenimana; Belise Murekatete; Josiane Nyirankundineza; Cathia Uwamahoro; Merveille Uwase; Sarah Uwera (wk); Antoinette Uwimbabazi; Margueritte Vumiliya	Linda Bull (c); Adama Kamara; Aminata Kamara; Ann Marie Kamara; Zainab Kamara; Ramatu Kassim; Mabinty King (wk); Isatu Koroma; Janet Kowa; Fatmata Parkinson; Fatu Pessima; Mabinty Sankoh; Mary Sheriff; Marie Turay	Hudaa Omary (c); Zinaida Jeremiah; Sophia Jerome; Perice Kamunya; Fatuma Kibasu; Jennifer Kimaro; Linda Massawe; Shufaa Mohamed; Saum Mtae; Monica Pascal; Neema Pius; Nasra Saidi; Mwanaiddi Shakim; Mwanaidi Swedy; Nuru Tindo; Mwanamvua Ushanga	Immaculate Nakisuuyi (c); Janet Mbabazi (vc); Prosscovia Alako; Irene Alumo; Evelyn Anyipo; Concy Aweko; Kevin Awino (wk); Naome Bagenda; Damalie Busingye; Esther Iloku; Patricia Malemikia; Rita Musamali; Stephani Nampiina; Racheal Ntono	Mary-Anne Musonda (c); Christabel Chatonzwa; Chiedza Dhururu (wk); Tasmeen Granger; Nyasha Gwanzura; Precious Marange; Audrey Mazvishaya; Esther Mbofana; Chipo Mugeri-Tiripano; Pellagia Mujaji; Modester Mupachikwa; Ashley Ndiraya; Josephine Nkomo; Loryn Phiri; Nomvelo Sibanda; Loreen Tshuma	

== Group stage ==
=== Group A ===
Teams	P	W	L	T	NR	Pts	NRR	Status
Zimbabwe	5	5	0	0	0	10	+4.435	Advanced to the semi-finals
Tanzania	5	4	1	0	0	8	+5.764	Advanced to the semi-finals
Rwanda	5	3	2	0	0	6	+2.030	
Botswana	5	2	3	0	0	4	+1.786	
Mozambique	5	1	4	0	0	2	–5.416	
Eswatini	5	0	5	0	0	0	–9.094	

9 September 2021
09:15
Scorecard

Mozambique; 17 (7.2 overs)	v	Rwanda; 18/0 (2.1 overs)
Ofelia Moiane 3 (3); Immaculee Muhawenimana 4/6 (3 overs)		Sarah Uwera 7* (3 overs)

Rwanda Women won by 10 wickets
Botswana Cricket Association Oval 1, Gaborone
Umpires: Sanjay Bhargava (Bot) and Shaun George (SA)
Player of the match: Immaculee Muhawenimana (Rwa)

- Rwanda Women won the toss and elected to field.
- Tania Chiracheque, Alda Mangue, Ofelia Moiane and Helena Ponja (Moz) all made their WT20I debuts.

9 September 2021
14:15
Scorecard

Botswana; 224/2 (20 overs)	v	Eswatini; 29 (15 overs)
Olebogeng Batisani 77 (66); Nombuso Khumalo 1/33 (4 overs)		Mbali Dlamini 6 (11); Botsogo Mpedi 3/1 (3 overs)

Botswana Women won by 195 runs
Botswana Cricket Association Oval 1, Gaborone
Umpires: Andrew Louw (Nam) and Isaac Oyieko (Ken)
Player of the match: Olebogeng Batisani (Bot)

- Botswana Women won the toss and elected to bat.
- Dumsile Dlamini, Mbali Dlamini, Phindo Dlamini, Winile Ginindza, Ntombizini Gwebu, Nombuso Khumalo, Nothando Mabila, Nokulunga Mabuza, Khulani Maseko, Ntombizodwa Mkhatshwa and Ntombizonke Mkhatshwa (Esw) all made their WT20I debuts.

10 September 2021
09:15
Scorecard

Tanzania; 103 (19.4 overs)	v	Zimbabwe; 104/4 (19 overs)
Monica Pascal 42 (41); Loryn Phiri 4/12 (4 overs)		Mary-Anne Musonda 52* (45); Nasra Saidi 2/9 (3 overs)

Zimbabwe Women won by 6 wickets
Botswana Cricket Association Oval 1, Gaborone
Umpires: Ravi Angara (Bot) and Andrew Louw (Nam)
Player of the match: Mary-Anne Musonda (Zim)

- Tanzania Women won the toss and elected to bat.
- Sophia Jerome, Linda Massawe and Mwanaiddi Shakim (Tan) all made their WT20I debuts.

10 September 2021
14:15
Scorecard

Botswana; 151/6 (20 overs)	v	Mozambique; 41 (14 overs)
Amantle Mokgotlhe 52* (24); Christina Magaia 2/30 (4 overs)		Palmira Cuinica 13 (20); Shameelah Mosweu 6/3 (4 overs)

Botswana Women won by 110 runs
Botswana Cricket Association Oval 1, Gaborone
Umpires: Lauren Agenbag (SA) and Rockie D'Mello (Ken)
Player of the match: Shameelah Mosweu (Bot)

- Mozambique Women won the toss and elected to field.
- Shameelah Mosweu (Bot) took a five-wicket haul including a hat-trick.

11 September 2021
09:15
Scorecard

Eswatini; 17 (9.2 overs)	v	Zimbabwe; 18/0 (2 overs)
Ntombizini Gwebu 6 (8); Esther Mbofana 6/11 (4 overs)		Modester Mupachikwa 13* (17)

Zimbabwe Women won by 10 wickets
Botswana Cricket Association Oval 1, Gaborone
Umpires: Shaun George (SA) and Isaac Oyieko (Ken)
Player of the match: Esther Mbofana (Zim)

- Eswatini Women won the toss and elected to bat.
- Tenele Malinga (Esw) and Esther Mbofana (Zim) both made their WT20I debuts.
- Esther Mbofana (Zim) took a five-wicket haul.

11 September 2021
14:15
Scorecard

Tanzania; 228/4 (20 overs)	v	Mozambique; 28 (12.5 overs)
Mwanaidi Swedy 87* (48); Christina Magaia 3/35 (4 overs)		Olga Matsolo 6* (23); Perice Kamunya 3/6 (4 overs)

Tanzania Women won by 200 runs
Botswana Cricket Association Oval 1, Gaborone
Umpires: Andrew Louw (Nam) and Rockie D'Mello (Ken)
Player of the match: Mwanaidi Swedy (Tan)

- Mozambique Women won the toss and elected to field.
- Mwanaidi Swedy and Mwanamvua Ushanga (Tan) both made their WT20I debuts.

12 September 2021
09:15
Scorecard

Rwanda; 204/5 (20 overs)	v	Eswatini; 19 (9 overs)
Gisele Ishimwe 114* (69); Winile Ginindza 2/24 (2.4 overs)		Ntombizodwa Mkhatshwa 5 (22); Margueritte Vumiliya 4/0 (1 over)

Rwanda Women won by 185 runs
Botswana Cricket Association Oval 1, Gaborone
Umpires: Ravi Angara (Bot) and Iknow Chabi (Zim)
Player of the match: Gisele Ishimwe (Rwa)

- Rwanda Women won the toss and elected to bat.
- Nomvuyo Magagula (Esw) made her WT20I debut.
- Gisele Ishimwe (Rwa) scored her first century in WT20Is.

12 September 2021
14:30
Scorecard

Zimbabwe; 113/5 (20 overs)	v	Botswana; 31 (13 overs)
Ashley Ndiraya 44 (39); Tuelo Shadrack 1/12 (4 overs)		Laura Mophakedi 14 (26); Loryn Phiri 5/6 (4 overs)

Zimbabwe Women won by 82 runs
Botswana Cricket Association Oval 2, Gaborone
Umpires: Lauren Agenbag (SA) and Andrew Louw (Nam)
Player of the match: Loryn Phiri (Zim)

- Zimbabwe Women won the toss and elected to bat.
- Loryn Phiri (Zim) took her first five-wicket haul in WT20Is.

13 September 2021
09:15
Scorecard

Tanzania; 104/8 (20 overs)	v	Rwanda; 61 (16.5 overs)
Saum Mtae 34 (29); Margueritte Vumiliya 3/10 (4 overs)		Cathia Uwamahoro 11 (19); Fatuma Kibasu 4/13 (2.5 overs)

Tanzania Women won by 43 runs
Botswana Cricket Association Oval 1, Gaborone
Umpires: Iknow Chabi (Zim) and Isaac Oyieko (Ken)
Player of the match: Fatuma Kibasu (Tan)

- Tanzania Women won the toss and elected to bat.

13 September 2021
14:15
Scorecard

Zimbabwe; 205/3 (20 overs)	v	Mozambique; 34 (14.2 overs)
Josephine Nkomo 56* (32); Cristina Magaia 2/29 (4 overs)		Palmira Cuinica 20 (21); Precious Marange 4/8 (4 overs)

Zimbabwe Women won by 171 runs
Botswana Cricket Association Oval 1, Gaborone
Umpires: Lauren Agenbag (SA) and Sanjay Bhargava (Bot)
Player of the match: Josephine Nkomo (Zim)

- Zimbabwe Women won the toss and elected to bat.
- Sheila Guambe (Moz) made her WT20I debut.

14 September 2021
09:15
Scorecard

Tanzania; 279/2 (20 overs)	v	Eswatini; 23 (11.5 overs)
Fatuma Kibasu 127* (66); Dumsile Dlamini 1/28 (2.4 overs)		Winile Ginindza 5 (13); Mwanamvua Ushanga 3/1 (3.5 overs)

Tanzania Women won by 256 runs
Botswana Cricket Association Oval 1, Gaborone
Umpires: Andrew Louw (Nam) and Isaac Oyieko (Ken)
Player of the match: Fatuma Kibasu (Tan)

- Tanzania Women won the toss and elected to bat.
- Mawilsia May (Esw) made her WT20I debut.

14 September 2021
14:15
Scorecard

Botswana; 94/9 (20 overs)	v	Rwanda; 95/7 (18.4 overs)
Shameelah Mosweu 21 (30); Margueritte Vumiliya 2/10 (4 overs)		Henriette Ishimwe 19 (19); Jacqueline Kgang 3/22 (4 overs)

Rwanda Women won by 3 wickets
Botswana Cricket Association Oval 1, Gaborone
Umpires: Ravi Angara (Bot) and Shaun George (SA)
Player of the match: Henriette Ishimwe (Rwa)

- Rwanda Women won the toss and elected to field.

16 September 2021
09:15
Scorecard

Mozambique; 138/6 (20 overs)	v	Eswatini; 55 (15.1 overs)
Olga Matsolo 33* (54); Ntombizonke Mkhatshwa 2/24 (4 overs)		Ntombizodwa Mkhatshwa 12 (27); Cecelia Murrombe 4/4 (2 overs)

Mozambique Women won by 83 runs
Botswana Cricket Association Oval 1, Gaborone
Umpires: Sanjay Bhargava (Bot) and Isaac Oyieko (Ken)
Player of the match: Olga Matsolo (Moz)

- Mozambique Women won the toss and elected to bat.

16 September 2021
09:30
Scorecard

Zimbabwe; 142/4 (20 overs)	v	Rwanda; 90/9 (20 overs)
Mary-Anne Musonda 34 (28); Sifa Ingabire 2/29 (4 overs)		Sarah Uwera 39 (55); Loreen Tshuma 4/11 (4 overs)

Zimbabwe Women won by 52 runs
Botswana Cricket Association Oval 2, Gaborone
Umpires: Ravi Angara (Bot) and Shaun George (SA)
Player of the match: Loreen Tshuma (Zim)

- Rwanda Women won the toss and elected to field.

16 September 2021
14:30
Scorecard

Botswana; 82 (19.3 overs)	v	Tanzania; 83/3 (10.5 overs)
Olebogeng Batisani 24 (33); Perice Kamunya 3/6 (4 overs)		Monica Pascal 34* (26); Florence Samanyika 1/5 (1 over)

Tanzania Women won by 7 wickets
Botswana Cricket Association Oval 1, Gaborone
Umpires: Iknow Chabi (Zim) and Andrew Louw (Nam)
Player of the match: Perice Kamunya (Tan)

- Botswana Women won the toss and elected to bat.

=== Group B ===
Teams	P	W	L	T	NR	Pts	NRR	Status
Namibia	4	4	0	0	0	8	+2.795	Advanced to the semi-finals
Uganda	4	3	1	0	0	6	+3.030	Advanced to the semi-finals
Nigeria	4	2	2	0	0	4	–0.277	
Sierra Leone	4	1	3	0	0	2	–1.232	
Cameroon	4	0	4	0	0	0	–5.367	

9 September 2021
09:30
Scorecard

Namibia; 105/4 (20 overs)	v	Uganda; 101/7 (20 overs)
Kayleen Green 54* (49); Evelyn Anyipo 1/9 (2 overs)		Immaculate Nakisuuyi 36 (31); Sune Wittmann 2/11 (4 overs)

Namibia Women won by 4 runs
Botswana Cricket Association Oval 2, Gaborone
Umpires: Lauren Agenbag (SA) and Ravi Angara (Bot)
Player of the match: Kayleen Green (Nam)

- Uganda Women won the toss and elected to field.
- Irene Alumo (Uga) made her WT20I debut.

9 September 2021
14:30
Scorecard

Sierra Leone; 102/9 (20 overs)	v	Nigeria; 103/5 (16 overs)
Aminata Kamara 28 (36); Joy Efosa 2/15 (4 overs)		Blessing Etim 27 (31); Fatu Pessima 2/25 (3 overs)

Nigeria Women won by 5 wickets
Botswana Cricket Association Oval 2, Gaborone
Umpires: Iknow Chabi (Zim) and Rockie D'Mello (Ken)
Player of the match: Blessing Etim (Nga)

- Sierra Leone won the toss and elected to bat.
- George Chinyenum, Lucky Piety (Nga) and Fatu Pessima (Sle) all made their WT20I debuts.

10 September 2021
14:30
Scorecard

Namibia; 125/7 (20 overs)	v	Nigeria; 66/7 (20 overs)
Kayleen Green 29 (21); Taiwo Abdulquadri 2/19 (4 overs)		Omonye Asika 14* (28); Sylvia Shihepo 2/12 (2 overs)

Namibia Women won by 59 runs
Botswana Cricket Association Oval 2, Gaborone
Umpires: Sanjay Bhargava (Bot) and Iknow Chabi (Zim)
Player of the match: Kayleen Green (Nam)

- Nigeria Women won the toss and elected to field.

11 September 2021
14:30
Scorecard

Uganda; 104/8 (20 overs)	v	Nigeria; 61 (14.5 overs)
Stephani Nampiina 22* (20); Mary Desmond 2/18 (4 overs)		Omonye Asika 13 (12); Concy Aweko 2/7 (4 overs)

Uganda Women won by 43 runs
Botswana Cricket Association Oval 2, Gaborone
Umpires: Lauren Agenbag (SA) and Sanjay Bhargava (Bot)
Player of the match: Stephanie Nampiina (Uga)

- Uganda Women won the toss and elected to bat.

12 September 2021
14:30
Scorecard

Uganda; 190/6 (20 overs)	v	Cameroon; 35 (14.3 overs)
Rita Musamali 59 (40); Michele Ekani 1/27 (4 overs)		Madaleine Sissako 17 (35); Concy Aweko 3/4 (4 overs)

Uganda Women won by 155 runs
Botswana Cricket Association Oval 2, Gaborone
Umpires: Shaun George (SA) and Isaac Oyieko (Ken)
Player of the match: Concy Aweko (Uga)

- Uganda Women won the toss and elected to bat.
- Marguerite Bessala, Maeva Douma, Michelle Ekani, Akago Eliane, Nantia Kenfack, Tchouabo Leslie, Clemence Manidom, Bernadette Mbida, Cynerah Mboe, Jeanne Ngono, Madeleine Sissako (Cmr) and Patricia Malemikia (Uga) all made their WT20I debuts.
- Concy Aweko took her second hat-trick in a WT20I.

13 September 2021
09:30
Scorecard

Namibia; 144/6 (20 overs)	v	Sierra Leone; 87/9 (20 overs)
Sune Wittmann 52 (43); Zainab Kamara 3/25 (4 overs)		Marie Turay 18 (29); Yasmeen Khan 3/10 (4 overs)

Namibia Women won by 57 runs
Botswana Cricket Association Oval 2, Gaborone
Umpires: Ravi Angara (Bot) and Rockie D'Mello (Ken)
Player of the match: Sune Wittmann (Nam)

- Sierra Leone Women won the toss and elected to field.
- Kaylee van Wyk (Nam) and Marie Turay (Sle) both made their WT20I debuts.

13 September 2021
14:30
Scorecard

Cameroon; 47 (19.3 overs)	v	Nigeria; 48/0 (6.3 overs)
Nantia Kenfack 23* (31); Blessing Etim 4/0 (4 overs)		Kehinde Abdulquadri 16* (18); Blessing Etim (Nga)

Nigeria Women won by 10 wickets
Botswana Cricket Association Oval 2, Gaborone
Umpires: Shaun George (SA) and Andrew Louw (Nam)

- Cameroon Women won the toss and elected to bat.

14 September 2021
09:30
Scorecard

Sierra Leone; 86/8 (20 overs)	v	Uganda; 87/1 (12.5 overs)
Fatu Pessima 22 (32); Stephani Nampiina 3/18 (4 overs)		Kevin Awino 39* (36); Ann Marie Kamara 1/14 (2 overs)

Uganda Women won by 9 wickets
Botswana Cricket Association Oval 2, Gaborone
Umpires: Sanjay Bhargava (Bot) and Iknow Chabi (Zim)
Player of the match: Kevin Awino (Uga)

- Sierra Leone Women won the toss and elected to bat.

14 September 2021
14:30
Scorecard

Cameroon; 30 (15.5 overs)	v	Namibia; 31/2 (3.5 overs)
Bernadette Mbida 10 (20); Wilka Mwatile 5/6 (4 overs)		Yasmeen Khan 11* (13); Madaleine Sissako 1/6 (2 overs)

Namibia Women won by 8 wickets
Botswana Cricket Association Oval 2, Gaborone
Umpires: Lauren Agenbag (SA) and Rockie D'Mello (Ken)
Player of the match: Wilka Mwatile (Nam)

- Cameroon Women won the toss and elected to bat.
- Michel Tedjui (Cmr) and Mekelaye Mwatile (Nam) both made their WT20I debuts.
- Wilka Mwatile became the first cricketer for Namibia to take a five-wicket haul in WT20Is.

15 September 2021
14:30
Scorecard

Cameroon; 76/9 (20 overs)	v	Sierra Leone; 77/4 (14.3 overs)
Madaleine Sissako 21 (23); Linda Bull 3/11 (4 overs)		Linda Bull 17 (21); Michele Ekani 3/12 (3.3 overs)

Sierra Leone Women won by 6 wickets
Botswana Cricket Association Oval 2, Gaborone
Umpires: Ravi Angara (Bot) and Rockie D'Mello (Ken)
Player of the match: Linda Bull (Sle)

- Cameroon Women won the toss and elected to bat.

== Play-offs ==
=== 1st Semi-final ===
17 September 2021
09:15
Scorecard

Zimbabwe; 108/6 (20 overs)	v	Uganda; 94 (20 overs)
Precious Marange 40 (25); Irene Alumo 2/13 (4 overs)		Immaculate Nakisuuyi 18 (29); Esther Mbofana 3/16 (4 overs)

Zimbabwe Women won by 14 runs
Botswana Cricket Association Oval 1, Gaborone
Umpires: Ravi Angara (Bot) and Andrew Louw (Nam)
Player of the match: Precious Marange (Zim)

- Zimbabwe Women won the toss and elected to bat.
- Pellagia Mujaji (Zim) made her WT20I debut.

=== 2nd Semi-final ===
17 September 2021
14:15
Scorecard

Tanzania; 89/7 (20 overs)	v	Namibia; 90/8 (19.5 overs)
Monica Pascal 30 (48); Kayleen Green 2/9 (3 overs)		Irene van Zyl 22 (28); Sophia Jerome 3/18 (4 overs)

Namibia Women won by 2 wickets
Botswana Cricket Association Oval 1, Gaborone
Umpires: Lauren Agenbag (SA) and Isaac Oyieko (Ken)
Player of the match: Irene van Zyl (Nam)

- Tanzania Women won the toss and elected to bat.

=== 3rd place play-off ===
19 September 2021
09:15
Scorecard

Uganda; 79 (18.4 overs)	v	Tanzania; 82/1 (13.2 overs)
Prosscovia Alako 20 (28); Fatuma Kibasu 2/3 (1.4 overs)		Saum Mtae 36 (40); Janet Mbabazi 1/14 (4 overs)

Tanzania Women won by 9 wickets
Botswana Cricket Association Oval 1, Gaborone
Umpires: Sanjay Bhargava (Bot) and Rockie D'Mello (Ken)
Player of the match: Fatuma Kibasu (Tan)

- Uganda Women won the toss and elected to bat.

=== Final ===
19 September 2021
14:15
Scorecard

Zimbabwe; 133/4 (20 overs)	v	Namibia; 120/9 (20 overs)
Chiedza Dhururu 44 (56); Kayleen Green 2/22 (4 overs)		Adri van der Merwe 29 (34); Nomvelo Sibanda 2/7 (2 overs)

Zimbabwe Women won by 13 runs
Botswana Cricket Association Oval 1, Gaborone
Umpires: Lauren Agenbag (SA) and Ravi Angara (Bot)
Player of the match: Chiedza Dhururu (Zim)

- Zimbabwe Women won the toss and elected to bat.
