= Papua New Guinea women's cricket team in Zimbabwe in 2023–24 =

International cricket tour

	Zimbabwe	Papua New Guinea
- Dates: 24 March – 2 April 2024
Captains	Mary-Anne Musonda (Note: Josephine Nkomo captained Zimbabwe in the third ODI.)	Brenda Tau

One Day International series
- Results: Zimbabwe won the 3-match series 3–0
Most runs	Chipo Mugeri-Tiripano (123)	Sibona Jimmy (88)
Most wickets	Josephine Nkomo (9)	Vicky Ara'a (6)

Twenty20 International series
- Results: Zimbabwe won the 3-match series 2–1
Most runs	Mary-Anne Musonda (115)	Tanya Ruma (106)
Most wickets	Josephine Nkomo (4)	Sibona Jimmy (3)

The Papua New Guinea women's cricket team toured Zimbabwe in March and April 2024 to play three One day International (ODI) and three Twenty20 International (T20I) matches against Zimbabwe.

The ODI matches were the first to be played by Papua New Guinea.

The T20I series formed part of Zimbabwe's preparation for the 2024 ICC Women's T20 World Cup Qualifier tournament.

Zimbabwe won the ODI series 3–0. They also won the first match of the T20I series, beating Papua New Guinea by 8 wickets. The second T20I ended in a tie, with Papua New Guinea winning the Super Over. It was Papua New Guinea's first victory over a full member in the format. Zimbabwe won the third T20I to take the series 2–1.

== Squads ==
Zimbabwe	Papua New Guinea
Mary-Anne Musonda (c); Kudzai Chigora; Francisca Chipare; Chiedza Dhururu (wk); Nyasha Gwanzura; Lindokuhle Mabhero; Precious Marange; Sharne Mayers; Audrey Mazvishaya; Chipo Mugeri-Tiripano; Pellagia Mujaji; Modester Mupachikwa (wk); Kelis Ndhlovu; Josephine Nkomo; Loryn Phiri; Nomvelo Sibanda; Loreen Tshuma	Brenda Tau (c, wk); Sibona Jimmy (vc); Melanie Ani; Vicky Ara'a; Vicky Buruka; Kevau Frank; Dika Lohia; Lakshmi Rajadurai; Tanya Ruma; Pauke Siaka; Henao Thomas; Geua Tom; Isabel Toua; Naoani Vare

== ODI series ==
=== 1st ODI ===
24 March 2024
09:15
Scorecard

Papua New Guinea; 177 (48 overs)	v	Zimbabwe; 178/3 (38.5 overs)
Brenda Tau 72 (118); Audrey Mazvishaya 3/28 (8 overs)		Chipo Mugeri-Tiripano 71* (105); Vicky Buruka 1/27 (5 overs)

Zimbabwe won by 7 wickets
Harare Sports Club, Harare
Umpires: Forster Mutizwa (Zim) and Oscar Tafirenyika (Zim)
Player of the match: Chipo Mugeri-Tiripano (Zim)

- Zimbabwe won the toss and elected to field.
- Vicky Ara'a, Vicky Buruka, Sibona Jimmy, Lakshmi Rajadurai, Tanya Ruma, Pauke Siaka, Brenda Tau, Henao Thomas, Geua Tom, Isabel Toua, Naoani Vare (PNG) all made their ODI debuts.

=== 2nd ODI ===
26 March 2024
09:15
Scorecard

Papua New Guinea; 125 (35.4 overs)	v	Zimbabwe; 126/8 (42.3 overs)
Pauke Siaka 28 (51); Francisca Chipare 3/15 (6.4 overs)		Modester Mupachikwa 57* (107); Vicky Ara'a 4/19 (9 overs)

Zimbabwe won by 2 wickets
Harare Sports Club, Harare
Umpires: David Shawane (Zim) and Oscar Tafirenyika (Zim)
Player of the match: Modester Mupachikwa (Zim)

- Zimbabwe won the toss and elected to field.
- Kevau Frank (PNG) made her ODI debut.

=== 3rd ODI ===
28 March 2024
09:15
Scorecard

Zimbabwe; 184 (46.4 overs)	v	Papua New Guinea; 149 (42.2 overs)
Chipo Mugeri-Tiripano 52 (60); Sibona Jimmy 4/22 (8.4 overs)		Sibona Jimmy 57 (91); Josephine Nkomo 3/20 (7.2 overs)

Zimbabwe won by 35 runs
Harare Sports Club, Harare
Umpires: Sarah Dambanevana (Zim) and Tafadzwa Musakwa (Zim)
Player of the match: Josephine Nkomo (Zim)

- Papua New Guinea won the toss and elected to field.
- Melanie Ani and Dika Lohia (PNG) both made their ODI debuts.

== T20I series ==
=== 1st T20I ===
30 March 2024
13:00
Scorecard

Papua New Guinea; 110/4 (20 overs)	v	Zimbabwe; 111/2 (17.4 overs)
Tanya Ruma 47 (60); Josephine Nkomo 3/18 (4 overs)		Mary-Anne Musonda 54* (51); Sibona Jimmy 1/26 (3.4 overs)

Zimbabwe won by 8 wickets
Harare Sports Club, Harare
Umpires: Iknow Chabi (Zim) and Forster Mutizwa (Zim)
Player of the match: Mary-Anne Musonda (Zim)

- Zimbabwe won the toss and elected to field.

=== 2nd T20I ===
31 March 2024
13:00
Scorecard

Zimbabwe; 119/6 (20 overs)	v	Papua New Guinea; 119/6 (20 overs)
Modester Mupachikwa 45* (50); Vicky Ara'a 2/20 (4 overs)		Pauke Siaka 43 (33); Precious Marange 1/4 (2 overs)

Match tied
(Papua New Guinea won the Super Over)
Harare Sports Club, Harare
Umpires: Iknow Chabi (Zim) and Sarah Dambanevana (Zim)
Player of the match: Pauke Siaka (PNG)

- Papua New Guinea won the toss and elected to field.
- Super Over: Papua New Guinea 7/0, Zimbabwe 6/0.

=== 3rd T20I ===
2 April 2024
18:30 (N)
Scorecard

Zimbabwe; 136/6 (20 overs)	v	Papua New Guinea; 104/4 (20 overs)
Chipo Mugeri-Tiripano 66 (59); Vicky Buruka 2/28 (4 overs)		Tanya Ruma 56* (59); Lindokuhle Mabhero 1/12 (4 overs)

Zimbabwe by 32 runs
Harare Sports Club, Harare
Umpires: Sarah Dambanevana (Zim) and Forster Mutizwa (Zim)
Player of the match: Chipo Mugeri-Tiripano (Zim)

- Papua New Guinea won the toss and elected to field.
