= Esther Mbofana =

Zimbabwean cricketer (born 1992)

Personal information
- Born: 23 November 1992 (age 33)
- Batting: Right-handed
- Bowling: Right-arm medium

International information
- National side: Zimbabwe
- ODI debut (cap 3): 5 October 2021 v Ireland
- Last ODI: 27 November 2021 v Pakistan
- T20I debut (cap 20): 11 September 2021 v Eswatini
- Last T20I: 19 September 2021 v Namibia

Domestic team information
- Years: Team
- 2020/21–present: Eagles

Career statistics
| Competition | WODI | WT20I |
|---|---|---|
| Matches | 8 | 7 |
| Runs scored | 36 | – |
| Batting average | 9.00 | – |
| 100s/50s | 0/0 | –/– |
| Top score | 14 | – |
| Balls bowled | 309 | 132 |
| Wickets | 6 | 13 |
| Bowling average | 48.33 | 7.00 |
| 5 wickets in innings | 0 | 1 |
| 10 wickets in match | 0 | 0 |
| Best bowling | 1/12 | 6/11 |
| Catches/stumpings | 0/– | 3/– |
- Source: Cricinfo, 13 September 2022

Esther Mbofana (born 23 November 1992) is a Zimbabwean cricketer. She played for the Zimbabwe women's national cricket team in the 2017 Women's Cricket World Cup Qualifier in February 2017. In February 2021, she was named in Zimbabwe's squad for their home series against Pakistan.

In September 2021, she was named in Zimbabwe's Women's Twenty20 International (WT20I) squad for the 2021 ICC Women's T20 World Cup Africa Qualifier tournament in Botswana. She made her WT20I debut on 11 September 2021, for Zimbabwe against Eswatini. In the match, she took a five-wicket haul, finishing with figures of six wickets for eleven runs from her four overs.

In October 2021, Mbofana was named in Zimbabwe's Women's One Day International (WODI) squad for their four-match series against Ireland. The fixtures were the first WODI matches after Zimbabwe gained WODI status from the ICC in April 2021. She made her WODI debut on 5 October 2021, for Zimbabwe against Ireland.

In November 2021, she was named in Zimbabwe's team for the 2021 Women's Cricket World Cup Qualifier tournament in Zimbabwe.
