= Maeva Douma =

Cameroonian cricketer (born 2005)

Personal information
- Full name: Maeva Francine Debora Douma
- Born: 25 February 2005 (age 21); Yaoundé, Cameroon
- Batting: Right-handed
- Bowling: Right-arm medium
- Role: All-rounder

International information
- National side: Cameroon
- T20I debut (cap 2): 12 September 2021 v Uganda
- Last T20I: 26 July 2025 v Mozambique

Career statistics
Competition	WT20I
Matches	20
Runs scored	25
Batting average	1.66
100s/50s	0/0
Top score	9
Balls bowled	276
Wickets	13
Bowling average	19.23
5 wickets in innings	0
10 wickets in match	0
Best bowling	3/8
Catches/stumpings	0/–
- Source: Cricinfo, 26 July 2025

Maeva Douma (born 25 February 2005) is a Cameroonian cricketer who plays for the Cameroon women's cricket team. In September 2021, on her T20I debut, she dismissed four batters by running them out at the non-striker's end, a form of dismissal known as "Mankading". It was only the second time that four run outs had been affected by one cricketer in a women's international match.

Douma began playing cricket while in school, after seeing a match being played where she lived, before joining a local cricket club. She plays as an all-rounder.

In September 2021, Douma was named in Cameroon's squad for the 2021 ICC Women's T20 World Cup Africa Qualifier tournament in Botswana. It was Cameroon's debut at an International Cricket Council (ICC) women's event. She made her Women's Twenty20 International (WT20I) debut for Cameroon on 12 September 2021, in their first match of the tournament, against Uganda. Douma took a wicket with her second delivery of the match, bowling Uganda's opener Prosscovia Alako and becoming the first Cameroon bowler to take a T20I wicket. She then went on to dismiss Kevin Awino, Rita Musamali, Immaculate Nakisuuyi and Janet Mbabazi, all by running them out at the non-striker's end. However, Uganda went on to win the match by 155 runs, after Cameroon only made 35 runs before being bowled out.

She aims to become a proper batter along with achieving some personal goals beyond cricket.

== See also ==
- List of Mankading incidents in cricket
