= List of Eswatini women Twenty20 International cricketers =

This is a list of Eswatini women Twenty20 International cricketers. A Women's Twenty20 International (WT20I) is an international cricket match between two representative teams. A WT20I is played under the rules of Twenty20 cricket. In April 2018, the International Cricket Council (ICC) granted full international status to Twenty20 women's matches played between member sides from 1 July 2018 onwards. Eswatini women played their first WT20I on 9 September 2021 against Botswana during the 2021 ICC Women's T20 World Cup Africa Qualifier. Botswana women won the match by 195 runs.

This list comprises all members of the Eswatini women's cricket team who have played at least one WT20I match. It is initially arranged in the order in which each player won her first Twenty20 cap. Where more than one player won their first Women's Twenty20 cap in the same match, their surnames are listed alphabetically (according to the name format used by Cricinfo).

== Key ==
General

- ‡ – Captain
- † – Wicket-keeper
- First – Year of debut
- Last – Year of latest game
- Mat – Number of matches played

Batting

- Runs – Runs scored in career
- HS – Highest score
- Avg – Runs scored per dismissal
- * – Batsman remained not out
- 50 – Half-centuries scored
- 100 – Centuries scored

Bowling

- Balls – Balls bowled in career
- Wkt – Wickets taken in career
- BBI – Best bowling in an innings
- Ave – Average runs per wicket

Fielding

- Ca – Catches taken
- St – Stumpings affected

== List of players ==
Statistics are correct as of 26 July 2025.

Eswatini women T20I cricketers
General					Batting				Bowling				Fielding		Ref
No.	Name	First	Last	Mat	Runs	HS	Avg	50	Balls	Wkt	BBI	Ave	Ca	St	Ref
1	Phindo Dlamini†	2021	2022	6	24	14*	8.00	0	–	–	–	–	2	0	
2	Dumsile Dlamini	2021	2023	12	20	6	1.81	0	96	2	1/28	72.50	4	0	
3	Mbali Dlamini‡	2021	2025	26	221	40	8.50	0	454	20	3/8	26.95	5	0	
4	Winile Ginindza	2021	2025	18	54	10	3.00	0	142	6	2/24	43.16	4	0	
5	Ntombizini Gwebu‡	2021	2025	11	20	6	1.81	0	–	–	–	–	0	0	
6	Nombuso Khumalo	2021	2022	8	2	1*	0.40	0	90	2	1/18	69.00	1	0	
7	Nokulunga Mabuza	2021	2023	14	8	4	0.80	0	186	6	2/25	52.83	1	0	
8	Nothando Mabila	2021	2025	18	68	205	4.00	0	270	9	3/16	34.77	1	0	
9	Khulani Maseko	2021	2021	3	0	0*	–	0	6	0	–	–	0	0	
10	Ntombizodwa Mkhatshwa†	2021	2025	24	91	12	3.79	0	–	–	–	–	8	0	
11	Ntombizonke Mkhatshwa‡	2021	2023	14	39	11	3.00	0	252	13	3/24	21.00	1	0	
12	Tenele Malinga	2021	2025	14	23	6*	2.55	0	232	6	3/6	42.83	1	0	
13	Nomvuyo Magagula	2021	2022	8	28	10	4.66	0	60	1	1/29	87.00	1	0	
14	Mawilsia May	2021	2022	5	12	8	2.40	0	–	–	–	–	3	0	
15	Njabuliso Dlamini	2022	2022	5	19	11	4.75	0	48	1	1/21	73.00	0	0	
16	Zakithi Mkhwanazi	2022	2022	5	0	0	0.00	0	66	2	2/4	49.50	0	0	
17	Nonduduzo Nyoni	2022	2022	1	0	0	0.00	0	–	–	–	–	0	0	
18	Siphesihle Khoza	2022	2022	3	9	8	3.00	0	–	–	–	–	0	0	
19	Bathobile Shongwe	2022	2022	1	–	–	–	–	–	–	–	–	0	0	
20	Lihle Thobela	2022	2023	3	8	6*	4.00	0	27	2	2/16	14.00	1	0	
21	Tibusiso Dlamini	2023	2025	14	8	0	0.80	0	173	4	1/12	55.25	1	0	
22	Lindokuhle Mamba	2023	2025	14	15	5	3.75	0	258	5	1/13	58.80	1	0	
23	Nokwethu Simelane	2023	2023	3	0	0*	0.00	0	36	2	1/12	25.00	1	0	
24	Abahle Nyirenda	2023	2023	1	1	1	1.00	0	–	–	–	–	0	0	
25	Owami Dlamini	2025	2025	4	1	1	0.50	0	24	0	–	–	0	0	
26	Lethokuhle Gwebu	2025	2025	7	3	1*	0.50	0	–	–	–	–	0	0	
27	Lihle Shabablala	2025	2025	11	26	6	2.60	0	–	–	–	–	0	0	
28	Lulama Simelane	2025	2025	8	0	0*	0.00	0	132	6	2/21	37.33	0	0	
29	Nkkosingiphile Mamba	2025	2025	10	9	4	1.00	0	102	2	2/29	61.00	1	0	
30	Sinothile Phakathi	2025	2025	4	25	15*	8.33	0	–	–	–	–	0	0	
31	Zinhle Shabalala	2025	2025	10	51	17	5.66	0	–	–	–	–	0	0	
32	Noncedo Simelane†	2025	2025	1	0	0*	–	0	–	–	–	–	0	0	
