= Tanzania women's national cricket team =

Cricket team

Tanzania
- Tanzania Cricket Association logo
- Association: Tanzania Cricket Association

Personnel
- Captain: Fatuma Kibasu

International Cricket Council
- ICC status: Associate member (2001)
- ICC region: Africa
ICC Rankings	Current	Best-ever
T20I	19th	16th (1 Oct 2022)

International cricket
- First international: v. Uganda; 8 April 2004

T20 Internationals
- First T20I: v. Zimbabwe at Takashinga Cricket Club, Harare; 6 May 2019
- Last T20I: v. Hong Kong at High Performance Oval, Windhoek; 30 July 2026
T20Is	Played	Won/Lost
Total	84	52/29 (0 ties, 3 no results)
This year	7	1/6 (0 ties, 0 no results)
- As of 30 July 2026

The Tanzanian women's cricket team represents Tanzania in international women's cricket.

Tanzania won the inaugural African women's championships in 2004 and has been one of the best-performing ICC associate member teams in Africa. The team also finished runner-up in the 2006 and 2011 African championships, but is yet to qualify for a global event.

== History ==
Organised women's cricket in Tanzania began in 1999, when the Tanzania Cricket Association (TCA) introduced "chanzo cricket" for girls into primary schools. A national under-15 team was created in 2002 for a regional tournament. The development of the sport has been hindered by social taboos against women's participation in sport, especially those with children.

The TCA hosted the inaugural African women's cricket championships in 2004, with limited involvement from the International Women's Cricket Council (IWCC). The national team was unbeaten, defeating Uganda, Kenya and Namibia in the round-robin and winning the final against Uganda by 8 wickets.

In March 2018, Tanzania was invited to participate in the 2018 ASEAN Women's T20 Open Tournament as a guest team, finishing as runner-up to the hosts Thailand.

In April 2018, the International Cricket Council (ICC) granted full Women's Twenty20 International (WT20I) status to all its members. Therefore, all Twenty20 matches played between Tanzania women and another international side since 1 July 2018 have been full WT20Is.

In December 2020, the ICC announced the qualification pathway for the 2023 ICC Women's T20 World Cup. Tanzania were named in the 2021 ICC Women's T20 World Cup Africa Qualifier regional group, alongside ten other teams.

Tanzanian batter Fatuma Kibasu scored her second T20I century in September 2021, an innings of 127 not out from 66 balls against Eswatini in the 2021 ICC Women's T20 World Cup Africa Qualifier, becoming only the fifth woman and the first from an ICC associate member team to score multiple T20I centuries.

== Current squad ==
This lists all the players who have played for Tanzania in the past 12 months or was named in the most recent squad. Updated on 19 November 2023.

Name	Age	Batting style	Bowling style	Notes
Batters
Fatuma Kibasu	36	Right-handed	Right-arm off break	Captain
Hudaa Omary	24	Right-handed		
Saum Mtae	23	Left-handed	Right-arm off break	
Monica Pascal	39	Right-handed	Right-arm leg break	
Allrounders
Aisha Mohamed	27	Right-handed	Right-arm medium	
Neema Pius	24	Right-handed	Right-arm medium	
Wicket-keepers
Shufaa Mohamedi	23	Right-handed		
Saumu Hussein	18	Right-handed		
Spin Bowlers
Sheila Kizito	21	Right-handed	Right-arm off break	
Mwanamvua Ushanga	21	Left-handed	Slow left-arm orthodox	
Pace Bowlers
Perice Kamunya	24	Right-handed	Right-arm medium	
Agnes Qwele	20	Right-handed	Right-arm medium	
Sophia Jerome	23	Right-handed	Right-arm medium	
Mwajabu Salum	37	Right-handed	Right-arm medium	
Saum Borakambi	21	Right-handed	Right-arm medium	

== Records and statistics ==
International Match Summary — Tanzania Women

Last updated 30 July 2026

Playing Record
Format	M	W	L	T	NR	Inaugural Match
Twenty20 Internationals	84	52	29	0	3	6 May 2019

=== Twenty20 International ===
- Highest team total: 285/1 v. Mali, 22 June 2019 at Gahanga International Cricket Stadium, Kigali.
- Highest individual score: 127*, Fatuma Kibasu v. Eswatini, 14 September 2021 at Botswana Cricket Association Oval, Gaborone.
- Best individual bowling figures: 5/0, Nasra Saidi v. Mali, 22 June 2019 at Gahanga International Cricket Stadium, Kigali.

Most T20I runs for Tanzania Women

Player	Runs	Average	Career span
Fatuma Kibasu	1,623	28.47	2019–2025
Saum Mtae	1,482	22.45	2019–2026
Hudaa Omary	1,120	21.53	2021–2026
Neema Pius	887	17.39	2019–2026
Perice Kamunya	512	10.89	2019–2026

Most T20I wickets for Tanzania Women

Player	Wickets	Average	Career span
Perice Kamunya	96	12.35	2019–2026
Nasra Saidi	61	13.37	2019–2026
Agnes Qwele	53	13.60	2022–2026
Sophia Jerome	48	13.02	2021–2026
Mwanamvua Ushanga	35	14.85	2021–2025

T20I record versus other nations

Records complete to WT20I #2938. Last updated 30 July 2026.

Opponent	M	W	L	T	NR	First match	First win
ICC Full members
Zimbabwe	3	0	3	0	0	6 May 2019	
ICC Associate members
Botswana	3	3	0	0	0	16 September 2021	16 September 2021
Brazil	2	2	0	0	0	16 June 2022	16 June 2022
Cameroon	1	1	0	0	0	12 June 2025	12 June 2025
Canada	4	2	1	0	1	4 November 2025	5 November 2025
Eswatini	1	1	0	0	0	14 September 2021	14 September 2021
Germany	1	1	0	0	0	13 June 2022	13 June 2022
Hong Kong	5	1	4	0	0	18 November 2023	30 July 2026
Japan	1	1	0	0	0	16 November 2023	16 November 2023
Kenya	7	5	2	0	0	12 June 2022	12 June 2022
Malawi	1	1	0	0	0	4 June 2025	4 June 2025
Mali	2	2	0	0	0	19 June 2019	19 June 2019
Mozambique	2	2	0	0	0	9 May 2019	9 May 2019
Namibia	7	2	4	0	1	17 September 2021	10 March 2024
Nepal	1	1	0	0	0	15 November 2023	15 November 2023
Netherlands	1	0	1	0	0	23 November 2025	
Nigeria	6	4	1	0	1	8 May 2019	8 May 2019
Papua New Guinea	1	0	1	0	0	30 November 2025	
Qatar	3	3	0	0	0	14 December 2022	14 December 2022
Rwanda	11	9	2	0	0	11 May 2019	11 May 2019
Scotland	1	0	1	0	0	21 November 2025	
Sierra Leone	3	3	0	0	0	28 February 2024	28 February 2024
Thailand	1	0	1	0	0	25 November 2025	
Uganda	14	7	7	0	0	18 June 2019	18 June 2019
United Arab Emirates	2	1	1	0	0	19 April 2023	19 April 2023

== Tournament history ==
=== ICC Women's ODI World Cup ===
Women's Cricket World Cup records
Host Year	Round	Position	GP	W	L	T	NR
(England) 1973	Did not qualify/No Women's ODI status						
(India) 1978	Did not qualify/No Women's ODI status						
(New Zealand) 1982	Did not qualify/No Women's ODI status						
(Australia) 1988	Did not qualify/No Women's ODI status						
(England) 1993	Did not qualify/No Women's ODI status						
(India) 1997	Did not qualify/No Women's ODI status						
(New Zealand) 2000	Did not qualify/No Women's ODI status						
(South Africa) 2005	Did not qualify/No Women's ODI status						
(Australia) 2009	Did not qualify/No Women's ODI status						
(India) 2013	Did not qualify/No Women's ODI status						
(England) 2017	Did not qualify/No Women's ODI status						
(New Zealand) 2022	Did not qualify/No Women's ODI status						
(India) 2025	Did not qualify/No Women's ODI status						
Total	0/13	0 Titles	0	0	0	0	0

=== ICC Women's Cricket World Cup Qualifier ===
ICC Women's Cricket World Cup Qualifier records
Host Year	Round	Position	GP	W	L	T	NR
(Netherlands) 2003	Did not qualify/No ODI status						
(South Africa) 2008	Did not qualify/No ODI status						
(Bangladesh) 2011	Did not qualify/No ODI status						
(Sri Lanka) 2017	Did not qualify/No ODI status						
(Zimbabwe) 2021	Did not qualify/No ODI status						
(Pakistan) 2025	Did not qualify/No ODI status						
Total	0/6	0 Title	0	0	0	0	0

=== ICC Women's World T20 ===
Twenty20 World Cup records
Host Year	Round	Position	GP	W	L	T	NR
(England) 2009	Did not qualify						
(Cricket West Indies) 2010	Did not qualify						
(Sri Lanka) 2012	Did not qualify						
(Bangladesh) 2014	Did not qualify						
(India) 2016	Did not qualify						
(Cricket West Indies) 2018	Did not qualify						
(Australia) 2020	Did not qualify						
(South Africa) 2023	Did not qualify						
(United Arab Emirates) 2024	Did not qualify						
(England) 2026	To be determined						
Total	0/9	0 Titles	0	0	0	0	0

=== ICC Women's Twenty20 Global Qualifier ===
ICC Women's World Twenty20 Qualifier records
Host Year	Round	Position	GP	W	L	T	NR
(Republic of Ireland) 2013	Did not qualify						
(Thailand) 2015	Did not qualify						
(Netherlands) 2018	Did not qualify						
(Scotland) 2019	Did not qualify						
(United Arab Emirates) 2022	Did not qualify						
(United Arab Emirates) 2024	Did not qualify						
Total	0/6	0 Titles	0	0	0	0	0

=== ICC Women's T20 Champions Trophy ===
ICC Women's T20 Champions Trophy records
Host Year	Round	Position	GP	W	L	T	NR
(Sri Lanka) 2027	To be determined						
2031	To be determined						
Total	–	0 Title	0	0	0	0	0

=== ICC Women's T20 World Cup Africa Qualifier ===
ICC Women's T20 World Cup Africa Qualifier records
Year	Round	Position	GP	W	L	T	NR
(Zimbabwe) 2019	Group stage	–	4	3	1	0	0
(Botswana) 2021	Semi-finals	–	7	4	3	0	0
Total	2/2	0 Title	11	7	4	0	0

=== ICC Women's T20 World Cup Africa Qualifier Division One ===
ICC Women's T20 World Cup Africa Qualifier Division One records
Year	Round	Position	GP	W	L	T	NR
(Uganda) 2023	Semi-finals	–	4	2	2	0	0
(Namibia) 2025	DNQ	3/8	5	4	1	0	0
Total	2/2	0 Title	9	6	3	0	0

=== ICC Women's T20 Champions Trophy ===
ICC Women's T20 Champions Trophy records
Host Year	Round	Position	GP	W	L	T	NR
(Sri Lanka) 2027	To be determined						
2031	To be determined						
Total	–	0 Title	0	0	0	0	0

=== Cricket at the African Games ===
Cricket at the African Games records
Host Year	Round	Position	GP	W	L	T	NR
(Ghana) 2023	Group stages	–	3	1	2	0	0
(Egypt) 2027	To be determined						
(Democratic Republic of the Congo) 2031	To be determined						
Total	1/1	0 Title	3	1	2	0	1

== See also ==
- List of Tanzania women Twenty20 International cricketers
