= Cameroon women's national cricket team =

Cricket team representing Cameroon

Cameroon
- Association: Cameroon Cricket Federation

International Cricket Council
- ICC status: Associate member (2017); Affiliate member (2007)
- ICC region: Africa
ICC Rankings	Current	Best-ever
T20I	68th	53th (8 Sep 2023)

T20 Internationals
- First T20I: v. Uganda at Botswana Cricket Association Oval, Gaborone; 12 September 2021
- Last T20I: v. Mozambique at Botswana Cricket Association Oval 2, Gaborone; 26 July 2025
T20Is	Played	Won/Lost
Total	33	7/26 (0 ties, 0 no results)
This year	0	0/0 (0 ties, 0 no results)
- As of 26 July 2025

The Cameroon national women's cricket team that represents Cameroon in international women's cricket. In April 2018, the International Cricket Council (ICC) granted full Women's Twenty20 International (WT20I) status to all its members. Therefore, all Twenty20 matches played between Cameroon women and other ICC members since 1 July 2018 have been full WT20I matches.

In December 2020, the ICC announced the qualification pathway for the 2023 ICC Women's T20 World Cup. The Cameroon women's team made their debut at an ICC women's event, when they played in the 2021 ICC Women's T20 World Cup Africa Qualifier group.

== Records and statistics ==
International Match Summary — Cameroon Women

Last updated 26 July 2025

Playing Record
Format	M	W	L	T	NR	Inaugural Match
Twenty20 Internationals	33	7	26	0	0	12 September 2021

=== Twenty20 International ===
T20I record versus other nations

Records complete to WT20I #2428. Last updated 26 July 2025.

Opponent	M	W	L	T	NR	First match	First win
ICC Associate members
Botswana	1	0	1	0	0	31 May 2024	
Brazil	1	0	1	0	0	11 June 2025	
Eswatini	2	2	0	0	0	3 September 2023	3 September 2023
Ghana	1	1	0	0	0	29 March 2023	29 March 2023
Kenya	2	0	2	0	0	6 September 2023	
Lesotho	1	1	0	0	0	21 July 2025	21 July 2025
Malawi	4	0	4	0	0	4 June 2024	
Mozambique	2	2	0	0	0	5 September 2023	5 September 2023
Namibia	1	0	1	0	0	14 September 2021	
Nigeria	4	0	4	0	0	13 September 2021	
Rwanda	4	0	4	0	0	31 March 2023	
Sierra Leone	6	1	5	0	0	15 September 2021	5 June 2025
Tanzania	1	0	1	0	0	12 June 2025	
Uganda	3	0	3	0	0	12 September 2021	

== Tournament history ==
=== Women's ODI World Cup ===
Women's Cricket World Cup records
Host Year	Round	Position	GP	W	L	T	NR
(England) 1973	Did not qualified						
(India) 1978	Did not qualified						
(New Zealand) 1982	Did not qualified						
(Australia) 1988	Did not qualified						
(England) 1993	Did not qualified						
(India) 1997	Did not qualified						
(New Zealand) 2000	Did not qualified						
(South Africa) 2005	Did not qualified						
(Australia) 2009	Did not qualified						
(India) 2013	Did not qualified						
(England) 2017	Did not qualified						
(New Zealand) 2022	Did not qualified						
(India) 2025	Did not qualified						
Total	0/13	0 Titles	0	0	0	0	0

=== Women's World T20 ===
Twenty20 World Cup records
Host Year	Round	Position	GP	W	L	T	NR
(England) 2009	Did not qualify						
(Cricket West Indies) 2010	Did not qualify						
(Sri Lanka) 2012	Did not qualify						
(Bangladesh) 2014	Did not qualify						
(India) 2016	Did not qualify						
(Cricket West Indies) 2018	Did not qualify						
(Australia) 2020	Did not qualify						
(South Africa) 2023	Did not qualify						
(United Arab Emirates) 2024	Did not qualify						
(England) 2026	To be determined						
Total	0/10	0 Titles	0	0	0	0	0

=== ICC Women's Cricket World Cup Qualifier ===
ICC Women's Cricket World Cup Qualifier record
Host Year	Round	Position	GP	W	L	T	NR
(Netherlands) 2003	Did not participate						
(South Africa) 2008	Did not participate						
(Bangladesh) 2011	Did not participate						
(Sri Lanka) 2017	Did not participate						
(Zimbabwe) 2021	Did not participate						
(Pakistan) 2025	Did not participate						
Total	0/5	0 Title	0	0	0	0	0

=== ICC Women's T20 World Cup Africa Qualifier ===
ICC Women's T20 World Cup Africa Qualifier records
Year	Round	Position	GP	W	L	T	NR
(Zimbabwe) 2019	Did not participate						
(Botswana) 2021	Group stages	–	4	0	4	0	0
(Uganda) 2023	Group stages	–	5	2	3	0	0
2025	To be determined						
Total	2/3	–	9	2	7	0	0

=== ICC Women's T20 Champions Trophy ===
ICC Women's T20 Champions Trophy records
Host Year	Round	Position	GP	W	L	T	NR
(Sri Lanka) 2027	To be determined						
2031	To be determined						
Total	–	0 Title	0	0	0	0	0

=== Cricket at the African Games ===
Cricket at the African Games records
Host Year	Round	Position	GP	W	L	T	NR
(Ghana) 2023	Did not participate						
(Egypt) 2027	To be determined						
(Democratic Republic of the Congo) 2031	To be determined						
Total	0/1	0 Title	5	2	2	0	1

=== ICC Women's T20 World Cup Qualifier ===
ICC Women's World Twenty20 Qualifier records
Year	Round	Position	GP	W	L	T	NR
(Republic of Ireland) 2013	Did not qualify						
(Thailand) 2015	Did not qualify						
(Netherlands) 2018	Did not qualify						
(Scotland) 2019	Did not qualify						
(United Arab Emirates) 2022	Did not qualify						
(United Arab Emirates) 2024	Did not qualify						
2025	To be determined						
Total	0/6	0 Title	3	0	3	0	0

=== ICC Women's T20 World Cup Africa Qualifier ===
Women's T20 World Cup Qualifier records
Year	Round	Position	GP	W	L	T	NR
(Zimbabwe) 2019	Did not participate						
(Botswana) 2021	DNQ	–	4	0	4	0	0
(Uganda) 2023	Did not participate						
Total	1/3	0 Title	4	0	4	0	1

=== Kwibuka Women's T20 Tournament ===
Kwibuka T20 Tournament records
Year	Round	Position	GP	W	L	T	NR
(Rwanda) 2014	Did not participate						
(Rwanda) 2015	Did not participate						
(Rwanda) 2016	Did not participate						
(Rwanda) 2017	Did not participate						
(Rwanda) 2018	Did not participate						
(Rwanda) 2019	Did not participate						
(Rwanda) 2021	Did not participate						
(Rwanda) 2022	Did not participate						
(Rwanda) 2023	Did not participate						
(Rwanda) 2024	Round-robin	8/8	7	0	7	0	0
(Rwanda) 2025	Round-robin	9/9	8	1	7	0	0
Total	2/11	0 Title	15	1	15	0	0

== See also ==
- List of Cameroon women Twenty20 International cricketers
