= Tanzania Cricket Association =

- Sport: Cricket
- Founded: 1961
- Affiliation: International Cricket Council
- Affiliation date: 2001
- Regional affiliation: Africa
- Location: Dar es Salaam, Tanzania
- Chairman: Dr. B. S. Sreekumar
- Coach: Duncan Allan

Official website
- tanzaniacricket.com
- (Tanzania)

Tanzania Cricket Association is the official governing body of the sport of cricket in Tanzania. Its current headquarters is in Dar Es Salaam, Tanzania. Tanzania Cricket Association is Tanzania's representative at the International Cricket Council and is an associate member and has been a member of that body since 2001. It is also a member of the African Cricket Association.

== History ==
The TCA has its roots in the 1933 Dar es Salaam Cricket League that decided that they should form a governing body to regulate the rules of the sport in Dar-es-salaam. The first president of this association was G. J. Patrige and P. E. Mitchell, was selected as the acting Governor, kindly consented to become the first patron of the Association. Following independence, the members of this association formed the Tanganyika Cricket Association. The association broke off from the East and Central Africa Cricket Conference, which was a cricket association founded in 1946 when the 3 colonial countries of East Africa were bound together with Kenya, Uganda and Tanganyika. After 1964, following the Union of Zanzibar and Tanganyika, the association was renamed as the Tanzania Cricket Association, engulfing Zanzibar cricket under its mandate.

== See also ==
- Tanzania Men's National Cricket Team
- Tanzania Women's National Cricket Team
