= 2019 Women's T20 World Cup Africa Qualifier =

International cricket tournament

2019 ICC Women's Qualifier Africa
- Dates: 5 – 12 May 2019
- Administrator: International Cricket Council
- Cricket format: Twenty20 International
- Tournament format(s): Group stage, final
- Host: Zimbabwe
- Champions: Zimbabwe
- Runners-up: Namibia
- Participants: 9
- Matches: 17
- Most runs: (Zimbabwe) Sharne Mayers (216)
- Most wickets: (Zimbabwe) Anesu Mushangwe (10)

The 2019 ICC Women's Qualifier Africa was a cricket tournament that was held in Zimbabwe in May 2019. The matches in the tournament were played as Women's Twenty20 Internationals (WT20Is), with the top team progressing to both the 2019 ICC Women's World Twenty20 Qualifier and the 2021 Women's Cricket World Cup Qualifier tournaments. Uganda had won the previous Africa qualifier tournament, when it was held in Windhoek, Namibia in 2017.

The fixtures took place at Harare Sports Club, Old Hararians and Takashinga Cricket Club in Harare. The teams in the Qualifier were split into two groups, with the winner of each group progressing to the final on 12 May 2019. All the squads were confirmed on 1 May 2019.

Namibia were undefeated in Group B to progress to the final of the qualifier tournament. Zimbabwe were also undefeated in winning Group A, to join Namibia in the qualifier's final. Zimbabwe beat Namibia by 50 runs in the final to win the tournament.

However, in July 2019, the International Cricket Council (ICC) suspended Zimbabwe Cricket, with the team barred from taking part in ICC events. The following month, with Zimbabwe banned from taking part in international cricket tournaments, the ICC confirmed that Namibia would replace them in the 2019 ICC Women's World Twenty20 Qualifier tournament.

== Teams ==
The following teams competed in the tournament:

- Kenya
- Mozambique
- Namibia
- Nigeria
- Rwanda
- Sierra Leone
- Tanzania
- Uganda
- Zimbabwe

== Fixtures ==
=== Group A ===
Pos	Team	Pld	W	L	T	NR	Pts	NRR	
1	Zimbabwe (H)	4	4	0	0	0	8	5.899	Advanced to Final
2	Tanzania	4	3	1	0	0	6	1.575	Eliminated
3	Rwanda	4	2	2	0	0	4	−0.995	Eliminated
4	Nigeria	4	1	3	0	0	2	−2.715	Eliminated
5	Mozambique	4	0	4	0	0	0	−3.817	Eliminated

(H) Host

5 May 2019
09:30
Scorecard

Zimbabwe; 198/3 (20 overs)	v	Mozambique; 35 (19.2 overs)
Sharne Mayers 62 (45); Isabel Chuma 2/32 (4 overs)		Fatima Guirrugo 7 (18); Audrey Mazvishaya 2/5 (4 overs); Precious Marange 2/5 (4 overs)

Zimbabwe Women won by 163 runs
Old Hararians Sports Club, Harare
Umpires: Rockie D'Mello (Ken) and Andrew Louw (Nam)
Player of the match: Sharne Mayers (Zim)

- Zimbabwe Women won the toss and elected to bat.
- Chiedza Dhururu, Audrey Mazvishaya (Zim), Rosalia Haiong, Olga Matsolo and Jessica Sainda (Moz) all made their WT20I debuts.

5 May 2019
13:50
Scorecard

Rwanda; 102/6 (20 overs)	v	Nigeria; 65 (16.1 overs)
Henriette Ishimwe 27 (21); Mary Desmond 2/12 (4 overs)		Joy Efosa 19 (25); Marie Bimenyimana 2/11 (4 overs)

Rwanda Women won by 37 runs
Takashinga Cricket Club, Harare
Umpires: Lauren Agenbag (SA) and Patric Makumbi (Uga)

- Nigeria Women won the toss and elected to field.
- Oyewole Oyronke (Ngr) made her WT20I debut.

6 May 2019
09:30
Scorecard

Mozambique; 93/7 (20 overs)	v	Nigeria; 94/2 (18.3 overs)
Christina Magaia 38* (24); Blessing Etim 3/14 (4 overs)		Blessing Nwobodo 33* (45); Fatima Guirrugo 1/9 (4 overs)

Nigeria Women won by 8 wickets
Old Hararians Sports Club, Harare
Umpires: Lauren Agenbag (SA) and Rockie D'Mello (Ken)
Player of the match: Blessing Nwobodo (Ngr)

- Nigeria Women won the toss and elected to field.
- Abigail Igbobie (Ngr) made her WT20I debut.
- Blessing Etim (Ngr) took her first hat-trick in WT20Is.

6 May 2019
13:50
Scorecard

Zimbabwe; 143/4 (20 overs)	v	Tanzania; 51/8 (20 overs)
Sharne Mayers 65 (50); Monica Pascal 2/20 (2 overs)		Getrude Mushi 16* (35); Anesu Mushangwe 2/3 (4 overs)

Zimbabwe Women won by 92 runs
Takashinga Cricket Club, Harare
Umpires: Patrick Musoke (Uga) and Justine Muzungu (Bot)
Player of the match: Sharne Mayers (Zim)

- Zimbabwe Women won the toss and elected to bat.
- Zinaida Jeremiah, Perice Kamunya, Fatuma Kibasu, Shufaa Mohamedi, Getrude Mushi, Hudaa Omary, Tabu Omary, Monica Pascal, Neema Pius, Nasra Saidi and Nuru Tindo (Tan) all made their WT20I debuts.

8 May 2019
09:30
Scorecard

Mozambique; 137/6 (20 overs)	v	Rwanda; 138/9 (19.3 overs)
Eulalia Moiane 48 (32); Marie Bimenyimana 3/21 (4 overs)		Henriette Ishimwe 48 (40); Cecelia Murrombe 3/27 (4 overs)

Rwanda Women won by 1 wicket
Old Hararians Sports Club, Harare
Umpires: Lauren Agenbag (SA) and Justine Muzungu (Bot)
Player of the match: Henriette Ishimwe (Rwa)

- Mozambique Women won the toss and elected to bat.
- Delphine Mukaruragwa (Rwa) made her WT20I debut.

8 May 2019
09:30
Scorecard

Tanzania; 156/1 (20 overs)	v	Nigeria; 70 (20 overs)
Fatuma Kibasu 70 (52); Agatha Obulor 1/23 (3 overs)		Samantha Agazuma 23 (49); Nuru Tindo 4/8 (4 overs)

Tanzania Women won by 86 runs
Takashinga Sports Club, Harare
Umpires: Rockie D'Mello (Ken) and Isaac Oyieko (Ken)
Player of the match: Fatuma Kibasu (Tan)

- Tanzania Women won the toss and elected to bat.

9 May 2019
09:30
Scorecard

Zimbabwe; 145/2 (20 overs)	v	Rwanda; 63/8 (20 overs)
Modester Mupachikwa 62 (58); Henriette Ishimwe 1/16 (2 overs)		Gisele Ishimwe 19 (32); Tasmeen Granger 3/11 (3 overs)

Zimbabwe Women won by 82 runs
Old Hararians Sports Club, Harare
Umpires: Patric Makumbi (Uga) and Patrick Musoke (Uga)
Player of the match: Modester Mupachikwa (Zim)

- Zimbabwe Women won the toss and elected to bat.

9 May 2019
09:30
Scorecard

Mozambique; 40 (10.4 overs)	v	Tanzania; 43/0 (4 overs)
Eulalia Moiane 15 (9); Tabu Omary 4/13 (4 overs)		Fatuma Kibasu 26* (19)

Tanzania Women won by 10 wickets
Takashinga Cricket Club, Harare
Umpires: Lauren Agenbag (SA) and Andrew Louw (Nam)

- Mozambique Women won the toss and elected to bat.
- Saum Mtae and Tatu Shabani (Tan) both made their WT20I debuts.

11 May 2019
09:30
Scorecard

Nigeria; 35 (12.1 overs)	v	Zimbabwe; 36/0 (3.4 overs)
Blessing Nwobodo 12 (29); Nomatter Mutasa 4/9 (4 overs)		Ashley Ndiraya 17* (13)

Zimbabwe Women won by 10 wickets
Old Hararians Sports Club, Harare
Umpires: Rockie D'Mello (Ken) and Patric Makumbi (Uga)
Player of the match: Nomatter Mutasa (Zim)

- Nigeria Women won the toss and elected to bat.

11 May 2019
09:30
Scorecard

Tanzania; 114/6 (20 overs)	v	Rwanda; 76/6 (20 overs)
Fatuma Kibasu 48 (56); Henriette Ishimwe 2/20 (3 overs)		Henriette Ishimwe 21 (17); Perice Kamunya 2/8 (4 overs)

Tanzania Women won by 38 runs
Takashinga Cricket Club, Harare
Umpires: Justine Muzungu (Bot) and Isaac Oyieko (Ken)
Player of the match: Fatuma Kibasu (Tan)

- Tanzania Women won the toss and elected to bat.

=== Group B ===
Pos	Team	Pld	W	L	T	NR	Pts	NRR	
1	Namibia	3	3	0	0	0	6	1.650	Advanced to Final
2	Uganda	3	2	1	0	0	4	1.333	Eliminated
3	Kenya	3	1	2	0	0	2	1.050	Eliminated
4	Sierra Leone	3	0	3	0	0	0	−4.231	Eliminated

5 May 2019
09:30
Scorecard

Namibia; 117/6 (20 overs)	v	Kenya; 78 (20 overs)
Sune Wittmann 25 (19); Mercyline Ochieng 3/11 (4 overs)		Daisy Njoroge 18 (19); Irene van Zyl 2/9 (4 overs)

Namibia Women won by 39 runs
Takashinga Cricket Club, Harare
Umpires: Lauren Agenbag (SA) and Patric Makumbi (Uga)
Player of the match: Sune Wittmann (Nam)

- Kenya Women won the toss and elected to field.
- Veronica Abuga and Edith Waithaka (Ken) both made their WT20I debuts.

5 May 2019
13:50
Scorecard

Uganda; 143/2 (20 overs)	v	Sierra Leone; 53 (16.5 overs)
Damalie Busingye 65* (59); Janet Kowa 1/19 (4 overs)		Isatu Koroma 12 (12); Concy Aweko 4/6 (3.5 overs)

Uganda Women won by 90 runs
Old Hararians Sports Club, Harare
Umpires: Andrew Louw (Nam) and Isaac Oyieko (Ken)
Player of the match: Damalie Busingye (Uga)

- Uganda Women won the toss and elected to bat.
- Mary Sheriff (Sle) made her WT20I debut.

6 May 2019
09:30
Scorecard

Kenya; 170/4 (20 overs)	v	Sierra Leone; 64/7 (20 overs)
Margaret Ngoche 73 (53); Aminata Kamara 2/37 (4 overs)		Ann Marie Kamara 30* (48); Mercyline Ochieng 2/11 (4 overs)

Kenya Women won by 106 runs
Takashinga Cricket Club, Harare
Umpires: Andrew Louw (Nam) and Justine Muzungu (Bot)
Player of the match: Margaret Ngoche (Ken)

- Kenya Women won the toss and elected to bat.

6 May 2019
13:50
Scorecard

Namibia; 115/6 (20 overs)	v	Uganda; 101/9 (20 overs)
Adri van der Merwe 31 (33); Immaculate Nakisuuyi 2/18 (4 overs)		Stephani Nampiina 25 (21); Irene van Zyl 4/7 (4 overs)

Namibia Women won by 14 runs
Old Hararians Sports Club, Harare
Umpires: Lauren Agenbag (SA) and Isaac Oyieko (Ken)
Player of the match: Irene van Zyl (Nam)

- Uganda Women won the toss and elected to field.

8 May 2019
13:50
Scorecard

Uganda; 100/5 (20 overs)	v	Kenya; 96/7 (20 overs)
Immaculate Nakisuuyi 30 (25); Esther Wachira 2/22 (4 overs)		Sylvia Kinyua 40 (57); Concy Aweko 4/12 (4 overs)

Uganda Women won by 4 runs
Old Hararians Sports Club, Harare
Umpires: Andrew Louw (Nam) and Justine Muzungu (Bot)
Player of the match: Concy Aweko (Uga)

- Uganda Women won the toss and elected to bat.
- Concy Aweko (Uga) took her first hat-trick in WT20Is.

8 May 2019
13:50
Scorecard

Sierra Leone; 74/8 (20 overs)	v	Namibia; 75/0 (12.2 overs)
Linda Bull 12 (19); Maryke Short 3/10 (4 overs)		Kayleen Green 36* (37)

Namibia Women won by 10 wickets
Takashinga Cricket Club, Harare
Umpires: Rockie D'Mello (Ken) and Patric Makumbi (Uga)
Player of the match: Maryke Short (Nam)

- Sierra Leone Women won the toss and elected to bat.
- Nancy Squire (Sle) made her WT20I debut.

== Final ==
12 May 2019
11:00
Scorecard

Zimbabwe; 114/5 (20 overs)	v	Namibia; 64/9 (20 overs)
Chipo Mugeri 36 (28); Kayleen Green 2/22 (3 overs)		Sune Wittmann 18 (43); Anesu Mushangwe 3/6 (4 overs)

Zimbabwe Women won by 50 runs
Harare Sports Club, Harare
Umpires: Lauren Agenbag (SA) and Isaac Oyieko (Ken)
Player of the match: Chipo Mugeri (Zim)

- Namibia Women won the toss and elected to field.
