= Fatuma Kibasu =

Tanzanian cricketer (born 1989)

Personal information
- Full name: Fatuma Omari Kibasu
- Born: 11 November 1989 (age 37)
- Batting: Right-handed
- Bowling: Right-arm offbreak
- Role: All-rounder

International information
- National side: Tanzania (2019-present)
- T20I debut: 6 May 2019 v Zimbabwe
- Last T20I: 17 December 2023 v Namibia

Career statistics
Competition	WT20I
Matches	45
Runs scored	1,245
Batting average	35.57
100s/50s	3/5
Top score	127*
Balls bowled	356
Wickets	16
Bowling average	21.62
5 wickets in innings	0
10 wickets in match	0
Best bowling	4/13
Catches/stumpings	9/–
- Source: Cricinfo, 8 October 2024

Fatuma Omari Kibasu (born 11 November 1989) is a Tanzanian cricketer who plays for the Tanzania women's national cricket team and also served as a former captain of the national side. She is the all-time leading runscorer for Tanzania in WT20I with 855 runs. She remains the only Tanzanian woman to score century at international level. She is also the only Tanzanian woman to have a scored a century in WT20I and the only Tanzanian to have scored multiple centuries in T20I cricket. She holds the current record for the highest individual score for Tanzania in WT20Is.

== Career ==
Kibasu was a member of the Tanzanian side which emerged as runners-up during the 2018 ASEAN Women's T20 Open Tournament where Tanzania was invited as a guest team for the unofficial T20 tournament. In May 2019, she was named as skipper of the Tanzania's Women's Twenty20 International (WT20I) squad for the 2019 ICC Women's Qualifier Africa tournament. During the same tournament, she went onto make her WT20I debut on 6 May 2019 against Zimbabwe coincidentally on Tanzania's first ever women's international match and she also captained the side during the occasion.

In June 2019, she was appointed as captain of Tanzania for the 2019 Kwibuka Women's T20 Tournament and under her captaincy Tanzania thrived and won their maiden Kwibuka T20 Tournament where they defeated hosts Rwanda by a margin of 70 runs in the final. During the 2019 Kwibuka T20 Tournament scored her maiden international century while opening the batting against Mali facing 71 balls to score unbeaten 108 at a strike rate of 152.11 to propel Tanzania to gain early momentum in the match by helping to post a big team total of 285 for a loss of just one wicket. Mali failed to match the expectations as they bowled out for just 17 runs and Fatima was given the player of the match performance for her performance with the bat.

In September 2021, Kibasu was named in Tanzania's squad for the 2021 ICC Women's T20 World Cup Africa Qualifier tournament in Botswana. During a group stage match against Eswatini during the 2021 ICC Women's T20 World Cup Africa Qualifier, she scored her second international century as well as second WT20I century while opening the batting. Her unbeaten knock of 127 which came off just 66 deliveries at a strike rate of 192.42 propelled Tanzania to a huge total of 279/2 on the board batting first and Tanzania secured a thumping effortless win over Eswatni by 256 runs after wiping out the opposition for just 23 and she was awarded the player of the match trophy. She went onto become the first associate woman cricketer to score multiple centuries in WT20I cricket and became only the fifth woman cricketer to score a century in WT20I after Deandra Dottin, Danni Wyatt, Meg Lanning and Beth Mooney. She ended the 2021 ICC Women's T20 World Cup Africa Qualifier on a high note by emerging as the tournament's top runscorer with a tally of 280 runs.

In June 2022, she was named as the captain of Tanzania squad for the 2022 Kwibuka Women's T20 Tournament. Under her captaincy, Tanzania won the tournament remaining unbeaten throughout the entire tournament and emerged triumphant in the final after defeating Kenya in a low scoring affair by 44 runs.

Kibasu was selected to play in the inaugural edition of the Fairbreak Invitational in 2022 which was held in the United Arab Emirates. She was roped in by Spirit to play in 2022 Fairbreak Global tournament on the back of her impressive showing at the 2021 ICC WT20 World Cup Africa Qualifier. She was the only Tanzanian player to appear in the 2022 FairBreak Invitational T20 tournament.
