= List of Zimbabwe women ODI cricketers =

This is a list of Zimbabwe women's One-day international cricketers. A One Day International (ODI) is an international cricket match between two representative teams, each having ODI status. An ODI differs from Test matches in that the number of overs per team is limited, and that each team has only one innings. Zimbabwe women were granted ODI status by the International Cricket Council (ICC) in April 2021. Zimbabwe women played their first ODI on 5 October 2021, during their four-match series against Ireland.

The list is arranged in the order in which each player won her first ODI cap. Where more than one player won her first ODI cap in the same match, their surnames are listed alphabetically.

== Key ==
General

- † – Wicket-keeper
- First – Year of debut
- Last – Year of latest game
- Mat – Number of matches played

Batting

- Runs – Runs scored in career
- HS – Highest score
- Avg – Average runs scored per dismissal
- 50s – Number of half centuries
- 100 – Centuries scored
- * – Batter remained not out

Bowling

- Balls – Balls bowled in career
- Wkt – Wickets taken in career
- BBI – Best bowling in an innings
- Ave – Average runs conceded per wicket

Fielding

- Ca – Catches taken
- St – Stumpings taken

== Players ==
Statistics are correct as of 28 October 2026.

Zimbabwe Women ODI cricketers
Cap	Name	First	Last	Mat	Batting					Bowling					Fielding		Ref
Cap	Name	First	Last	Mat	Runs	HS	Avg	50	100	Balls	Wkt	BBI	Ave	5WI	Ca	St	Ref
1	Chiedza Dhururu†	2021	2026	26	272	46	12.95	0	0	—	—	—	—	—	9	4	
2	Precious Marange	2021	2026	14	148	29	12.33	0	0	660	14	3/39	33.92	0	1	0	
3	Esther Mbofana	2021	2021	8	36	14	9.00	0	0	309	6	1/12	48.83	0	0	0	
4	Pellagia Mujaji	2021	2024	7	86	26	12.28	0	0	—	—	—	—	—	0	0	
5	Modester Mupachikwa†	2021	2026	36	909	86	25.97	5	0	—	—	—	—	—	29	2	
6	Mary-Anne Musonda‡	2021	2024	16	336	103*	22.40	1	1	—	—	—	—	—	4	0	
7	Ashley Ndiraya	2021	2024	18	430	82*	26.87	1	0	25	1	1/3	16.00	0	3	0	
8	Josephine Nkomo‡	2021	2026	23	658	76	41.12	6	0	811	26	3/18	20.03	0	4	0	
9	Loryn Phiri	2021	2026	17	195	69	17.72	1	0	438	8	1/14	49.25	0	5	0	
10	Nomvelo Sibanda	2021	2026	30	183	35*	10.76	0	0	1169	23	3/41	42.13	0	7	0	
11	Loreen Tshuma	2021	2026	24	292	137	13.27	0	1	834	22	4/35	28.63	0	4	0	
12	Tasmeen Granger	2021	2021	3	38	20	12.66	0	0	96	2	2/53	56.00	0	0	0	
13	Nyasha Gwanzura	2021	2026	19	238	35*	14.87	0	0	279	10	4/33	22.20	0	4	0	
14	Audrey Mazvishaya	2021	2026	18	74	26*	9.25	0	0	672	13	3/28	39.92	0	3	0	
15	Christabel Chatonzwa	2021	2026	11	63	18	7.00	0	0	286	10	2/21	26.80	0	1	0	
16	Francisca Chipare	2021	2026	13	41	13	5.12	0	0	458	9	3/15	39.88	0	2	0	
17	Sharne Mayers	2021	2026	16	207	39	13.80	0	0	109	1	1/46	88.00	0	4	0	
18	Chipo Mugeri-Tiripano‡	2023	2026	27	747	71*	29.88	5	0	—	—	—	—	—	6	0	
19	Kelis Ndhlovu	2023	2026	25	526	61	22.86	4	0	618	19	5/22	19.36	1	8	0	
20	Kudzai Chigora	2024	2026	7	16	6	4.00	0	0	263	6	2/20	45.33	0	0	0	
21	Michelle Mavunga	2024	2026	11	72	29	8.00	0	0	367	5	3/36	76.40	0	3	0	
22	Lindokuhle Mabhero	2024	2026	14	34	20	6.80	0	0	600	10	3/21	42.90	0	4	0	
23	Beloved Biza	2024	2026	21	554	73	27.70	4	0	570	7	3/22	73.57	0	6	0	
24	Runyararo Pasipanodya	2024	2026	11	111	33*	18.50	0	0	36	1	1/11	40.00	0	1	0	
25	Olinder Chare	2024	2026	11	15	4*	3.00	0	0	420	7	2/41	54.71	0	2	0	
26	Adel Zimunu	2024	2026	14	104	23	11.55	0	0	481	10	2/22	47.70	0	2	0	
27	Tendai Makusha	2024	2026	15	37	12	5.28	0	0	581	10	2/12	50.80	0	3	0	
28	Melinda Kanchingwe	2026	2026	1	10	10	10.00	0	0	—	—	—	—	—	0	0	
29	Christine Mutasa	2026	2026	3	3	2	1.00	0	0	36	1	1/19	57.00	0	2	0	
30	Kelly Ndiraya	2026	2026	3	19	11	6.33	0	0	—	—	—	—	—	0	0	
31	Vimbai Mutungwindu†	2026	2026	2	2	2	1.00	0	0	—	—	—	—	—	1	1	

== See also ==
- List of Zimbabwe women Twenty20 International cricketers
