= Zimbabwe women's national cricket team =

Cricket team

Zimbabwe
- Nickname: Lady Chevrons
- Association: Zimbabwe Cricket

Personnel
- Captain: Mary-Anne Musonda
- Coach: Gary Brent

International Cricket Council
- ICC status: Full member (1992); Associate member (1981)
- ICC region: Africa
ICC Rankings	Current	Best-ever
ODI	14th	10th (3 April 2022)
T20I	14th	11th (24 April 2018)

International cricket
- First international: v Uganda at Nairobi; 8 December 2006

One Day Internationals
- First ODI: v Ireland at Harare Sports Club, Harare; 5 October 2021
- Last ODI: v India at Baroda Cricket Association Stadium, Vadodara; 28 October 2026
ODIs	Played	Won/Lost
Total	42	11/30 (1 tie, 0 no results)
This year	12	1/11 (0 ties, 0 no results)
- Women's World Cup Qualifier appearances: 3 (first in 2008)
- Best result: 5th (2008)

T20 Internationals
- First T20I: v Namibia at Sparta Cricket Club Ground, Walvis Bay; 5 January 2019
- Last T20I: v Ireland at Karwan Cricket Ground, Ajman; 22 November 2026
T20Is	Played	Won/Lost
Total	109	57/51 (1 tie, 0 no results)
This year	27	2/25 (0 ties, 0 no results)
- T20 World Cup Qualifier appearances: 2 (first in 2013)
- Best result: 3rd (2015)
ODI kit
T20I kit
- As of 22 November 2026

The Zimbabwe women's national cricket team represents Zimbabwe in international women's cricket. The team is organised by Zimbabwe Cricket, a full member of the International Cricket Council (ICC).

Zimbabwe's women team made its international debut in 2006, at the ICC Africa regional qualifier for the Women's Cricket World Cup. By winning that tournament, the team qualified for the 2008 World Cup Qualifier, eventually placing fifth out of eight teams by defeating Scotland in a play-off. However, at the 2011 World Cup Qualifier, Zimbabwe had little success, failing to win a single match. At the 2013 World Twenty20 Qualifier, the team placed sixth out of eight teams, while at the 2015 edition the team placed third, narrowly missing out on qualifying for the 2016 World Twenty20.

In December 2018, Mary-Anne Musonda was appointed the captain of the team, replacing Chipo Mugeri.

In December 2020, the ICC announced the qualification pathway for the 2023 ICC Women's T20 World Cup. Zimbabwe were named in the 2021 ICC Women's T20 World Cup Africa Qualifier regional group, alongside ten other teams.

In April 2021, the ICC awarded permanent Test and One Day International (ODI) status to all full member women's teams.

In August 2024, the ICC announced that it was adding Zimbabwe to the next cycle of the ICC Women's Championship.

== Current squad ==
This lists all the players who have played for Zimbabwe in the past 12 months or were named in the most recent One-day or T20I squad. Updated on 2 April 2024.

Name	Age	Batting style	Bowling style	Forms	Notes
Batters
Mary-Anne Musonda	35	Right-handed	Right-arm off break	ODI & T20I	Captain
Chipo Mugeri-Tiripano	34	Left-handed	Right-arm medium	ODI & T20I	
Ashley Ndiraya	34	Left-handed	Right-arm leg break	T20I	
Pellagia Mujaji	35	Right-handed	Right-arm medium	ODI & T20I	
Nyasha Gwanzura	30	Right-handed	Right-arm medium	ODI	
Sharne Mayers	34	Right-handed	Right-arm off break	ODI & T20I	
All-rounders
Kelis Ndhlovu	21	Left-handed	Slow left-arm orthodox	ODI & T20I	
Josephine Nkomo	29	Right-handed	Right-arm medium-fast	ODI & T20I	Vice-captain
Wicket-keepers
Chiedza Dhururu	30	Right-handed		ODI & T20I	
Modester Mupachikwa	29	Right-handed		ODI & T20I	
Spin Bowlers
Precious Marange	43	Left-handed	Right-arm off break	ODI & T20I	
Lindokuhle Mabhero	23	Right-handed	Right-arm off break	ODI & T20I	
Loryn Phiri	28	Right-handed	Right-arm off break	ODI	
Pace Bowlers
Nomvelo Sibanda	30	Left-handed	Left-arm medium	ODI & T20I	
Loreen Tshuma	29	Right-handed	Right-arm medium	ODI & T20I	
Audrey Mazvishaya	33	Right-handed	Right-arm medium	ODI & T20I	
Francisca Chipare	28	Right-handed	Right-arm medium	ODI & T20I	
Kudzai Chigora	20	Right-handed	Right-arm medium	ODI	

== Coaching staff ==
- Head coach: (Zimbabwe) Mark Coles
- Assistant coach: (Zimbabwe) Rangarirai Manyande
- Bowling Coach: (Zimbabwe) Trevor Garwe
- Fielding Coach: (Zimbabwe) Trevor Phiri
- Strength and Conditioning Coach: Faith Dube
- Team Manager: (Zimbabwe) Mary-Anne Musonda

== Honours ==
=== Other ===
- African Games
  - Gold medal (1): 2023

== Records and statistics ==
International Match Summary — Zimbabwe Women

Last updated 22 November 2026

Playing Record
Format	M	W	L	T	NR	Inaugural Match
One-Day Internationals	42	11	30	1	0	5 October 2021
Twenty20 Internationals	109	57	51	1	0	5 January 2019

=== One-Day Internationals ===
ODI record versus other nations

Records complete to WODI #1573. Last updated 28 October 2026.

Opponent	M	W	L	T	NR	First match	First win
ICC Full Members
Bangladesh	3	0	3	0	0	10 November 2021	
India	3	0	3	0	0	23 October 2026	
Ireland	9	1	7	1	0	5 October 2021	5 October 2021
New Zealand	3	0	3	0	0	5 March 2026	
Pakistan	4	0	4	0	0	27 November 2021	
West Indies	3	1	2	0	0	24 September 2026	27 September 2026
ICC Associate members
Papua New Guinea	3	3	0	0	0	24 March 2024	24 March 2024
Thailand	3	0	3	0	0	19 April 2023	
United Arab Emirates	4	2	2	0	0	26 September 2025	28 September 2025
United States	7	4	3	0	0	17 October 2024	17 October 2024

=== Twenty20 Internationals ===
- Highest team total: 205/3, v. Mozambique on 13 September 2021 at Botswana Cricket Association Oval 1, Gaborone.
- Highest individual score: 80, Chipo Mugeri-Tiripano v. Namibia on 20 April 2022, at Trans Namib Ground, Windhoek.
- Best individual bowling figures: 6/11, Esther Mbofana v. Eswatini on 11 September 2021 at Botswana Cricket Association Oval 1, Gaborone.

Most T20I runs for Zimbabwe Women

Player	Runs	Average	Career span
Modester Mupachikwa	1,763	27.12	2019–2026
Chipo Mugeri-Tiripano	1,503	24.24	2019–2026
Kelis Ndhlovu	1,417	21.14	2022–2026
Mary-Anne Musonda	1,054	25.70	2019–2024
Sharne Mayers	889	26.93	2019–2026

Most T20I wickets for Zimbabwe Women

Player	Wickets	Average	Career span
Josephine Nkomo	68	14.83	2019–2026
Precious Marange	59	15.18	2019–2026
Nomvelo Sibanda	57	21.33	2019–2026
Loreen Tshuma	48	18.58	2021–2026
Kelis Ndhlovu	44	19.79	2022–2026

T20I record versus other nations

Records complete to T20I #3091. Last updated 22 November 2026.

Opponent	M	W	L	T	NR	First match	First win
ICC Full Members
Bangladesh	1	0	1	0	0	13 November 2026	
India	3	0	3	0	0	16 October 2026	
Ireland	11	0	11	0	0	23 September 2022	
New Zealand	3	0	3	0	0	25 February 2026	
Pakistan	4	0	4	0	0	12 May 2026	
South Africa	5	0	5	0	0	11 September 2026	
Sri Lanka	1	0	1	0	0	20 November 2026	
West Indies	3	0	3	0	0	3 October 2026	
ICC Associate members
Botswana	2	2	0	0	0	12 September 2021	12 September 2021
Eswatini	1	1	0	0	0	11 September 2021	11 September 2021
Kenya	3	3	0	0	0	6 April 2019	6 April 2019
Mozambique	2	2	0	0	0	5 May 2019	5 May 2019
Namibia	17	13	4	0	0	5 January 2019	5 January 2019
Nepal	1	0	1	0	0	24 January 2026	
Netherlands	3	1	2	0	0	1 May 2024	18 November 2026
Nigeria	3	3	0	0	0	11 May 2019	11 May 2019
Papua New Guinea	4	3	0	1	0	18 September 2022	18 September 2022
Rwanda	3	3	0	0	0	9 May 2019	9 May 2019
Scotland	1	0	1	0	0	22 January 2026	22 January 2026
Sierra Leone	1	1	0	0	0	1 September 2025	1 September 2025
Tanzania	3	3	0	0	0	6 May 2019	6 May 2019
Thailand	11	6	5	0	0	27 August 2021	27 August 2021
Uganda	10	10	0	0	0	7 April 2019	7 April 2019
United Arab Emirates	8	3	5	0	0	12 September 2022	12 September 2022
United States	4	3	1	0	0	10 September 2022	10 September 2022
Vanuatu	1	0	1	0	0	25 April 2024	

== Tournament history ==
=== ICC Women's ODI World Cup ===
Women's Cricket World Cup records
Host Year	Round	Position	GP	W	L	T	NR
(England) 1973	Did not qualify						
(India) 1978	Did not qualify						
(New Zealand) 1982	Did not qualify						
(Australia) 1988	Did not qualify						
(England) 1993	Did not qualify						
(India) 1997	Did not qualify						
(New Zealand) 2000	Did not qualify						
(South Africa) 2005	Did not qualify						
(Australia) 2009	Did not qualify						
(India) 2013	Did not qualify						
(England) 2017	Did not qualify						
(New Zealand) 2022	Did not qualify						
(India) 2025	Did not qualify						
Total	0/13	0 Titles	0	0	0	0	0

=== ICC Women's World T20 ===
Twenty20 World Cup records
Host Year	Round	Position	GP	W	L	T	NR
(England) 2009	Did not qualify						
(Cricket West Indies) 2010	Did not qualify						
(Sri Lanka) 2012	Did not qualify						
(Bangladesh) 2014	Did not qualify						
(India) 2016	Did not qualify						
(Cricket West Indies) 2018	Did not qualify						
(Australia) 2020	Did not qualify						
(South Africa) 2023	Did not qualify						
(United Arab Emirates) 2024	Did not qualify						
(England) 2026	To be determined						
Total	–	0 Titles	0	0	0	0	0

=== ICC Women's Cricket World Cup Qualifier ===
ICC Women's Cricket World Cup Qualifier record
Host Year	Round	Position	GP	W	L	T	NR
(Netherlands) 2003	Did not participate						
(South Africa) 2008	Group stage	–	3	1	2	0	0
(Bangladesh) 2011	Group stage	10/10	4	0	4	0	0
(Sri Lanka) 2017	Group stage	–	4	1	3	0	0
(Zimbabwe) 2021	Group stage	–	3	1	2	0	0
(Pakistan) 2025	Did not qualify						
Total	4/5	0 Title	14	3	11	0	0

=== ICC Women's Twenty20 Global Qualifier ===
ICC Women's World Twenty20 Qualifier records
Host Year	Round	Position	GP	W	L	T	NR
(Republic of Ireland) 2013	Group stage	6/7	3	1	2	0	0
(Thailand) 2015	3rd place	3/8	5	3	2	0	0
(Netherlands) 2018	Did not participate						
(Scotland) 2019	Did not participate						
(United Arab Emirates) 2022	Did not participate						
(United Arab Emirates) 2024	Did not participate						
Total	2/6	0 Titles	8	4	4	0	0

=== ICC Women's T20 World Cup Africa Qualifier ===
ICC Women's T20 World Cup Africa Qualifier records
Year	Round	Position	GP	W	L	T	NR
(Zimbabwe) 2019	Champions	1/9	5	5	0	0	0
(Botswana) 2021	Champions	1/11	7	7	0	0	0
Total	2/2	2 Titles	12	12	0	0	0

=== ICC Women's T20 World Cup Africa Qualifier Division One ===
ICC Women's T20 World Cup Africa Qualifier Division One records
Year	Round	Position	GP	W	L	T	NR
(Uganda) 2023	Champion	1/8	5	5	0	0	0
(Namibia) 2025	Champion	1/8	5	5	0	0	0
Total	2/2	2 Titles	10	10	0	0	0

=== ICC Women's T20 Champions Trophy ===
ICC Women's T20 Champions Trophy records
Host Year	Round	Position	GP	W	L	T	NR
(Sri Lanka) 2027	To be determined						
2031	To be determined						
Total	–	0 Title	0	0	0	0	0

=== Cricket at the African Games ===
Cricket at the African Games records
Host Year	Round	Position	GP	W	L	T	NR
(Ghana) 2023	Champions	1/8	5	5	0	0	0
(Egypt) 2027	To be determined						
(Democratic Republic of the Congo) 2031	To be determined						
Total	1/1	1 Title	5	5	0	0	0

== See also ==
- Zimbabwe national cricket team
- List of Zimbabwe women ODI cricketers
- List of Zimbabwe women Twenty20 International cricketers
