= Victoria Hamunyela =

Namibian cricketer

Personal information
- Full name: Victoria Hashomwamona Hamunyela
- Born: 22 January 2003 (age 23); Okelemba, Ohangwena, Namibia
- Batting: Right-handed
- Bowling: Right-arm offbreak

International information
- National side: Namibia
- T20I debut (cap 4): 20 August 2018 v Malawi
- Last T20I: 12 September 2024 v United Arab Emirates

Career statistics
Competition	WT20I
Matches	56
Runs scored	23
Batting average	3.83
100s/50s	0/0
Top score	5*
Balls bowled	736
Wickets	52
Bowling average	14.15
5 wickets in innings	0
10 wickets in match	0
Best bowling	4/8
Catches/stumpings	9/–
- Source: Cricinfo, 7 October 2024

Victoria Hamunyela (born 22 January 2003) is a Namibian cricketer. She made her Women's Twenty20 International (WT20I) debut for the Namibia women's cricket team on 20 August 2018, against Malawi, in the 2018 Botswana Cricket Association Women's T20I Series. It was the first WT20I match to be played by Namibia.

In August 2019, she was named in Namibia's squad for the 2019 ICC Women's World Twenty20 Qualifier tournament in Scotland. She played in Namibia's opening match of the tournament, on 31 August 2019, against Ireland. In May 2021, she was named in Namibia's squad for the 2021 Kwibuka Women's T20 Tournament in Rwanda. In Namibia's opening match of the tournament, against Nigeria, Hamunyela took four wickets for eight runs and was named the player of the match. Following the conclusion of the tournament, Hamunyela was named in the team of the tournament, selected by the Rwanda Cricket Association.
