= Uganda women's national cricket team =

Cricket team

Uganda
- Uganda Cricket Association logo
- Nickname: Victoria Pearls
- Association: Uganda Cricket Association

Personnel
- Captain: Janet Mbabazi
- Coach: Laurence Sematimba

International Cricket Council
- ICC status: Associate member (1998)
- ICC region: Africa
ICC Rankings	Current	Best-ever
T20I	17th	14th (6 Jan 2019)

T20 Internationals
- First T20I: v. Scotland at VRA Cricket Ground, Amstelveen; 7 July 2018
- Last T20I: v. Rwanda at Entebbe Cricket Oval, Entebbe; 14 November 2026
T20Is	Played	Won/Lost
Total	141	88/52 (1 tie, 0 no results)
This year	14	10/3 (1 tie, 0 no results)
- T20 World Cup Qualifier appearances: 2 (first in 2018, 2024)
- Best result: 6th (2018)
T20I kit
- As of 14 November 2026

The Uganda women's national cricket team represents Uganda in international women's cricket. They played their first matches as part of a triangular series that also involved Kenya and Kenya's A side in January 2006. They played in the African regional qualifiers for the 2009 World Cup in December 2006 against Kenya, Tanzania and Zimbabwe. They finished third in the tournament.

== History ==
In April 2018, the International Cricket Council (ICC) granted full Women's Twenty20 International (WT20I) status to all its members. Therefore, all Twenty20 matches played between Uganda women and another international side since 1 July 2018 have been full WT20I matches. In July 2018, Uganda played its first WT20I match against Scotland in 2018 ICC Women's World Twenty20 Qualifier in the Netherlands. In June 2019, Uganda women scored 314 runs against Mali in the Kwibuka Women's T20 Tournament, the highest total for any team, male or female, in a T20 international match.

In December 2020, the ICC announced the qualification pathway for the 2023 ICC Women's T20 World Cup. Uganda were named in the 2021 ICC Women's T20 World Cup Africa Qualifier regional group, alongside ten other teams.

In 2023, the Uganda Cricket Association announced the introduction of central contracts for twelve women players.

== Tournament history ==
=== ICC Women's ODI World Cup ===
Women's Cricket World Cup records
Host Year	Round	Position	GP	W	L	T	NR
(England) 1973	Did not qualify/No Women's ODI status						
(India) 1978	Did not qualify/No Women's ODI status						
(New Zealand) 1982	Did not qualify/No Women's ODI status						
(Australia) 1988	Did not qualify/No Women's ODI status						
(England) 1993	Did not qualify/No Women's ODI status						
(India) 1997	Did not qualify/No Women's ODI status						
(New Zealand) 2000	Did not qualify/No Women's ODI status						
(South Africa) 2005	Did not qualify/No Women's ODI status						
(Australia) 2009	Did not qualify/No Women's ODI status						
(India) 2013	Did not qualify/No Women's ODI status						
(England) 2017	Did not qualify/No Women's ODI status						
(New Zealand) 2022	Did not qualify/No Women's ODI status						
(India) 2025	Did not qualify/No Women's ODI status						
Total	0/13	0 Titles	0	0	0	0	0

=== ICC Women's Cricket World Cup Qualifier ===
ICC Women's Cricket World Cup Qualifier record
Host Year	Round	Position	GP	W	L	T	NR
(Netherlands) 2003	Did not qualify/No ODI status						
(South Africa) 2008	Did not qualify/No ODI status						
(Bangladesh) 2011	Did not qualify/No ODI status						
(Sri Lanka) 2017	Did not qualify/No ODI status						
(Zimbabwe) 2021	Did not qualify/No ODI status						
(Pakistan) 2025	Did not qualify/No ODI status						
Total	0/6	0 Title	0	0	0	0	0

=== ICC Women's World T20 ===
Twenty20 World Cup records
Host Year	Round	Position	GP	W	L	T	NR
(England) 2009	Did not qualify						
(Cricket West Indies) 2010	Did not qualify						
(Sri Lanka) 2012	Did not qualify						
(Bangladesh) 2014	Did not qualify						
(India) 2016	Did not qualify						
(Cricket West Indies) 2018	Did not qualify						
(Australia) 2020	Did not qualify						
(South Africa) 2023	Did not qualify						
(United Arab Emirates) 2024	Did not qualify						
(England) 2026	To be determined						
Total	0/9	0 Titles	0	0	0	0	0

=== ICC Women's Twenty20 Global Qualifier ===
ICC Women's World Twenty20 Qualifier records
Host Year	Round	Position	GP	W	L	T	NR
(Republic of Ireland) 2013	Did not qualify						
(Thailand) 2015	Did not qualify						
(Netherlands) 2018	DNQ	6/8	5	2	3	0	0
(Scotland) 2019	Did not qualify						
(United Arab Emirates) 2022	Did not qualify						
(United Arab Emirates) 2024	DNQ	9/10	4	1	3	0	0
(Nepal) 2026	Did not qualify						
Total	2/7	0 Titles	9	3	6	0	0

=== ICC Women's T20 Champions Trophy ===
ICC Women's T20 Champions Trophy records
Host Year	Round	Position	GP	W	L	T	NR
(Sri Lanka) 2027	To be determined						
2031	To be determined						
Total	–	0 Title	0	0	0	0	0

=== Cricket at Summer Olympics Games ===
Cricket at Summer Olympics records
Host Year	Round	Position	GP	W	L	T	NR
(United States) 2028	To be determined						
(Australia) 2032	To be determined						
Total	–	0 Title	0	0	0	0	0

=== ICC Women's T20 World Cup Africa Qualifier ===
ICC Women's T20 World Cup Africa Qualifier records
Year	Round	Position	GP	W	L	T	NR
(Zimbabwe) 2019	DNQ	–	3	2	1	0	0
(Botswana) 2021	DNQ	4/11	6	3	3	0	0
Total	2/2	0 Title	9	5	4	0	0

=== ICC Women's T20 World Cup Africa Qualifier Division One ===
ICC Women's T20 World Cup Africa Qualifier Division Two records
Year	Round	Position	GP	W	L	T	NR
(Uganda) 2023	DNQ; Runners-up	2/8	5	4	1	0	0
(Namibia) 2025	DNQ	4/8	5	2	3	0	0
Total	2/2	0 Title	10	6	4	0	0

=== Kwibuka Women's T20 Tournament ===
Kwibuka T20 Tournament records
Year	Round	Position	GP	W	L	T	NR
(Rwanda) 2014	Champion	The full information of the tournament has not been found					
(Rwanda) 2015	Runners-up	The full information of the tournament has not been found					
(Rwanda) 2016	Champion	The full information of the tournament has not been found					
(Rwanda) 2017	Runners-up	The full information of the tournament has not been found					
(Rwanda) 2018	Runners-up	The full information of the tournament has not been found					
(Rwanda) 2019	Runners-up	2/4	6	4	2	0	0
(Rwanda) 2021	Did not participate						
(Rwanda) 2022	3rd-place	3/8	8	6	2	0	0
(Rwanda) 2023	Runners-up	2/5	9	8	1	0	0
(Rwanda) 2024	Champions	1/8	8	8	0	0	0
(Rwanda) 2025	3rd-place	3/9	10	7	3	0	0
Total	10/10	3 Titles	41	33	8	0	0

== Records and statistics ==
International Match Summary — Uganda Women

Last updated 14 November 2026

Playing Record
Format	M	W	L	T	NR	Inaugural Match
Twenty20 Internationals	141	88	52	1	0	7 July 2018

=== Twenty20 International ===
- Highest team total: 314/2 v. Mali on 20 June 2019 at Gahanga International Cricket Stadium, Kigali.
- Highest individual score: 116, Prosscovia Alako v. Mali on 20 June 2019 at Gahanga International Cricket Stadium, Kigali.
- Best individual bowling figures: 6/11, Phiona Kulume v. Namibia on 23 April 2022 at Trans Namib Ground, Windhoek.

Most T20I runs for Uganda Women

Player	Runs	Average	Career span
Rita Musamali	1,891	22.24	2018–2026
Janet Mbabazi	1,794	16.45	2018–2026
Immaculate Nakisuuyi	1,678	19.74	2018–2026
Stephani Nampiina	1,350	16.87	2018–2026
Prosscovia Alako	1,288	16.30	2019–2026

Most T20I wickets for Uganda Women

Player	Wickets	Average	Career span
Concy Aweko	153	12.24	2018–2026
Janet Mbabazi	133	12.42	2018–2026
Immaculate Nakisuuyi	72	16.75	2018–2026
Sarah Akiteng	67	17.35	2022–2026
Stephani Nampiina	47	13.08	2018–2026
Evelyn Anyipo	47	16.40	2019–2025

T20I record versus other nations

Records complete to T20I #3070. Last updated 14 November 2026.

Opponent	M	W	L	T	NR	First match	First win
ICC Full members
Ireland	1	0	1	0	0	10 July 2018	
Sri Lanka	1	0	1	0	0	1 May 2024	
Zimbabwe	10	0	10	0	0	7 April 2019	
ICC Associate members
Botswana	4	4	0	0	0	16 June 2022	16 June 2022
Brazil	2	2	0	0	0	14 June 2022	14 June 2022
Cameroon	3	3	0	0	0	12 September 2021	
Canada	5	5	0	0	0	20 October 2025	20 October 2025
Germany	1	1	0	0	0	15 June 2022	15 June 2022
Hong Kong	6	4	2	0	0	27 April 2023	27 April 2023
Kenya	12	11	1	0	0	6 April 2019	6 April 2019
Malawi	2	2	0	0	0	3 June 2024	3 June 2024
Mali	2	2	0	0	0	20 June 2019	20 June 2019
Namibia	24	11	12	1	0	6 May 2019	1 May 2023
Nepal	7	4	3	0	0	16 May 2022	16 May 2022
Netherlands	2	1	1	0	0	12 July 2018	12 July 2018
Nigeria	8	5	3	0	0	11 September 2021	11 September 2021
Papua New Guinea	1	1	0	0	0	25 November 2025	25 November 2025
Qatar	2	2	0	0	0	14 December 2022	14 December 2022
Rwanda	17	14	3	0	0	19 June 2019	19 June 2019
Scotland	3	0	3	0	0	7 July 2018	
Sierra Leone	3	3	0	0	0	5 May 2019	5 May 2019
Tanzania	14	7	7	0	0	18 June 2019	15 December 2022
Thailand	4	1	3	0	0	8 July 2018	8 July 2018
United Arab Emirates	4	2	2	0	0	20 April 2023	20 April 2023
United States	3	3	0	0	0	27 April 2024	27 April 2024

== Squad ==
Updated on 8 June 2024

This lists all the players who played for Uganda in the 2024 Kwibuka Women's T20 Tournament.

Name	Age	Batting style	Bowling style	Notes
Batters
Rita Musamali	27	Right-handed	Right-arm medium	Vice-captain
Immaculate Nakisuuyi	30	Right-handed	Right-arm off break	
Prosscovia Alako	24	Right-handed	Right-arm medium	
All-rounders
Janet Mbabazi	30	Right-handed	Right-arm medium	Captain
Stephanie Nampiina	26	Right-handed	Right-arm leg break	
Malisa Ariokot	19	Right-handed	Right-arm medium	
Wicket-keepers
Kevin Awino	30	Right-handed		
Jimia Mohammed	19	Right-handed		
Spin Bowlers
Concy Aweko	35	Right-handed	Right-arm off break	
Lorna Anyait	19	Right-handed	Right-arm off break	
Pace Bowlers
Sarah Walaza	24	Right-handed	Right-arm medium	
Asumin Akurut	19	Right-handed	Right-arm medium	
Patricia Timong	19	Right-handed	Right-arm medium	
Immaculate Nandera	19	Right-handed	Left-arm medium	

== See also ==
- List of Uganda women Twenty20 International cricketers
