= Mary-Anne Musonda =

Zimbabwean cricketer (born 1991)

Personal information
- Full name: Mary-Anne Musonda
- Born: 4 August 1991 (age 35); Harare, Zimbabwe
- Batting: Right-handed
- Bowling: Right-arm off break
- Role: Batter

International information
- National side: Zimbabwe
- ODI debut (cap 6): 5 October 2021 v Ireland
- Last ODI: 26 March 2024 v Papua New Guinea
- T20I debut (cap 6): 5 January 2019 v Namibia
- Last T20I: 1 May 2024 v Netherlands

Domestic team information
- Years: Team
- 2010/11–2014/15: KwaZulu-Natal Inland
- 2020/21–present: Rhinos
- 2023–present: Scorchers

Career statistics
Competition	WODI	WT20I
Matches	16	58
Runs scored	336	1054
Batting average	22.40	25.70
100s/50s	1/1	0/5
Top score	103*	60
Catches/stumpings	4/–	21/–
- Source: Cricinfo, 30 April 2026

Mary-Anne Musonda (born 4 August 1991) is a Zimbabwean former cricketer and captained the women's national cricket team. She is a right-handed batter and an off-break bowler. She also has a master's degree in Development Finance from the University of Cape Town. On April 27, 2026, Musonda announced her retirement from all forms of cricket.

== Early life and education ==
Musonda was born in Harare to a Zimbabwean mother and a Zambian father. The youngest in a family of four children, and also the only girl, she began her education at Hermann Gmeiner Primary School in Harare. From 2004, she attended Kwekwe High School at Kwekwe, in the Midlands province, where she passed all 10 of her subjects.

At high school, Musonda also participated in various sports. Initially, she focused on hockey. However, her hockey coach was a friend of the cricket coach, Craig Majawa. In Form One, he recruited her to play cricket, and became her first cricket coach. She also played basketball, volleyball, and netball.

Although Zimbabwe Cricket was introducing girls' cricket at schools, Musonda's high school did not then have a girls' team. "I started playing with the boys... for a term or two, and really fell in love with cricket," she told Cricinfo in 2022. "I never went back to hockey."

In school cricket, Musonda was an all-rounder. She started out bowling pace, but later switched to off spin after suffering an injury. Majawa encouraged her to believe she would be "an excellent cricketer", and she modelled her game around that of her favourite player, English cricketer Charlotte Edwards.

Less than a year after Musonda took up cricket, her school established a girls' team, and some of its members competed in provincial trials. She was included in a probable, but unofficial, 13 for the national women's team squad.

Musonda went on her first tour as part of the national team in 2006. With the support of her mother, she decided to combine playing cricket with the pursuit of her studies. Due to her school commitments, she did not initially participate in all of the national team's activities.

In 2020, Musonda told Women's CricZone, "Growing up I wanted to have a white collar job, and be involved in marketing. But at the end of high school I then felt that I could take cricket seriously." She was also driven to conquer both academia and the cricket world.

Following her graduation from high school, Musonda returned to Harare, where she undertook her Advanced Levels at St. John's High School, Emerald Hill. In 2015, she obtained a Bachelor of Commerce degree with honours from the University of KwaZulu-Natal in South Africa. In 2018, she completed a Master of Commerce degree in Development Finance from the Graduate School of Business at the University of Cape Town.

Between finishing her bachelor's degree and starting her master's course, Musonda looked unsuccessfully for a job in Zimbabwe. After finishing the master's degree, she returned to Zimbabwe but decided not to look for work immediately. Instead, she devoted herself to cricket. A year later, that decision paid off when she was appointed captain of the national team.

== Domestic career ==
While studying in South Africa for her bachelor's degree, Musonda played domestic cricket for KwaZulu-Natal Inland.

In July 2019, she was one of four Zimbabwe women cricketers barred by the International Cricket Council (ICC) from participating in a Global Development Squad due to play in England against Women's Cricket Super League teams, following the ICC's suspension of Zimbabwe Cricket earlier in the month.

Very little top level domestic women's cricket was played in Zimbabwe until the 2020–21 season, when Zimbabwe Cricket launched both the Fifty50 Challenge and the Women's T20 Cup. For both of those tournaments, Musonda was recruited by the Rhinos team. In the inaugural Women's T20 Cup, she was player of the tournament.

In April 2023, it was announced that Musonda would play for Scorchers in that season's Women's Super Series in Ireland.

== International career ==
=== 2006–2018: Early years ===
Musonda's first tour with the national team was in December 2006, when she travelled to Nairobi, Kenya, for the African qualifying leg of the 2009 Women's Cricket World Cup. It was also the first time the national team had ever been involved in a full international competition. Zimbabwe won that qualifying leg, and Musonda enjoyed the experience, but did not play in any of the team's three matches. School commitments prevented her from attending the ensuing World Cup Qualifier in South Africa in February 2008.

In 2011, Musonda 'returned' to the national team. However, she was not selected for the squad that competed in the Women's Cricket World Cup Qualifier in Bangladesh in November 2011. At the inaugural ICC Women's World Twenty20 Qualifier, held in Dublin, Ireland, in July and August 2013, she played in the Shield semi-final against Japan, and the Shield final against Thailand. In December 2014, she was part of Zimbabwe's squad for the ICC Africa Women's Trophy played in Benoni, South Africa, which Zimbabwe won. During the ensuing ICC Women's World Twenty20 Qualifier, in Bangkok, Thailand, in November and December 2015, she played in all four of Zimbabwe's matches.

Musonda had a more prominent role in the next Women's Cricket World Cup Qualifier, held in Colombo, Sri Lanka, in February 2017. She was the highest run-scorer for Zimbabwe, with 113 runs.

=== 2018–present: Captaincy, WT20I and WODI years ===
The following year, 2018, was a disappointing one for the national team, which narrowly missed out on qualifying for that year's ICC Women's World Twenty20 Qualifier. In December 2018, Musonda, who had not participated in the Africa qualifiers in which Zimbabwe had been eliminated by Uganda from the World Cup, was appointed as the captain of the team, replacing Chipo Mugeri. She considers the highlight of captaincy to be continuously finding ways of making adequate decisions. Her initial objective was to lead the team to its maiden World Cup tournament.

On 5 January 2019, the month after her appointment, Musonda made her Women's Twenty20 International (WT20I) debut for Zimbabwe against Namibia, at the start of a five-match T20I tour of Namibia, which Zimbabwe won 5–0. Musonda also topped the overall batting table for that tour, with an aggregate of 140 at an average of 70. Before returning home, the team competed against Kenya and Uganda in the Victoria Tri-Series in Kampala, Uganda, and also won that tournament.

Musonda was then to have led the team on a tour of Ireland and the Netherlands in July 2019, but that tour was cancelled at the last minute after the ICC moved to freeze all funding to Zimbabwe. Soon afterwards, the ICC barred Zimbabwe from all ICC events, including the ICC Women's World Twenty20 Qualifier in Scotland in August 2019, for which the national team had already qualified. Musonda considers Zimbabwe's exclusion from that tournament to be the worst moment of her career; the ICC ban on Zimbabwe was lifted after only three months, but soon afterwards the COVID-19 pandemic began. In February 2021, Musonda was named as the captain of Zimbabwe's squad for its home 50-over and T20I series against Pakistan, which were scheduled as the national team's first matches since the onset of the pandemic. However, that tour was ended abruptly after only one match, because of flight restrictions associated with the pandemic.

In April 2021, the ICC gave Zimbabwe Women's One Day International (WODI) status. In October 2021, Musonda was named as the captain of Zimbabwe's WODI squad for their four-match series against Ireland. The fixtures were Zimbabwe's first WODI matches gaining WODI status. Musonda made her WODI debut on 5 October 2021, against Ireland. Zimbabwe won the match by four wickets, with Musonda scoring an unbeaten century, and sharing in three half-century stands. She was only the sixth woman to score a century on ODI debut, the first ever to do so while captaining her team, and the first to score any international century for Zimbabwe.

In November 2021, Musonda was named as the captain of Zimbabwe's team for the 2021 Women's Cricket World Cup Qualifier tournament in Zimbabwe. Zimbabwe lost two of its first three matches in the tournament, and defeated the United States by only one wicket. The rest of the tournament was then cancelled due to the COVID-19 pandemic.

In April 2022, Musonda again led her team in the Capricorn Women's Tri-Series in Windhoek, Namibia, except in one of its matches against Uganda, when she was rested and Josephine Nkomo stood in for her. After losing its first match to Namibia by seven wickets, Zimbabwe won all five of its remaining matches, including the final, also against Namibia, and also by seven wickets. During one of Zimbabwe's matches in the series, against Uganda, Musonda was, unusually, given out for obstructing the field. She had defended a ball from Janet Mbabazi which then rebounded towards her stumps, then gently hit the ball back to Mbabazi while remaining in her crease at all times.

== Off the field ==
=== Basketball ===
Musonda has also played basketball for the Vixens in the Harare Basketball League.

=== Professional life ===
Musonda is interested in development issues, specifically for African girls and women. She is also involved in literacy and numeracy interventions for children in junior schools in remote areas of Zimbabwe. Her post-retirement plan is to promote women's cricket by opening an all-sports academy specifically for females, and primarily for cricket.

=== Personal life ===
A Christian, Musonda has been a member of the Life and Liberty Churches International since 2015. Previously, she was a congregant at a Methodist Church from childhood.

== See also ==
- List of Zimbabwe women Twenty20 International cricketers
