= Eswatini women's national cricket team =

Eswatini
- Flag of Eswatini
- Association: Eswatini Cricket Association

International Cricket Council
- ICC status: Associate member (2017); Affiliate member (2007)
- ICC region: Africa
ICC Rankings	Current	Best-ever
T20I	62nd	45th (4 Feb 2019)

T20 Internationals
- First T20I: v Botswana at Botswana Cricket Association Oval, Gaborone; 9 September 2021
- Last T20I: v Lesotho at Botswana Cricket Association Oval 2, Gaborone; 26 July 2025
T20Is	Played	Won/Lost
Total	26	0/26 (0 ties, 0 no results)
This year	0	0/0 (0 ties, 0 no results)
- As of 26 July 2025

The Eswatini women's national cricket team represents Eswatini (formerly known as Swaziland) in women's cricket matches.

In April 2018, the International Cricket Council (ICC) granted full Women's Twenty20 International (WT20I) status to all its members. Therefore, all Twenty20 matches played between Eswatini women and another ICC member nation after 1 July 2018 have the WT20I status.

== Records and statistics ==
International Match Summary — Eswatini Women

Last updated 26 July 2025

Playing Record
Format	M	W	L	T	NR	Inaugural Match
Twenty20 Internationals	26	0	26	0	0	9 September 2021

=== Twenty20 International ===
T20I record versus other nations

Records complete to WT20I #2427. Last updated 26 July 2025.

Opponent	M	W	L	T	NR	First match	First win
ICC Full members
Zimbabwe	1	0	1	0	0	11 September 2021	
ICC Associate members
Botswana	4	0	4	0	0	9 September 2021	
Cameroon	2	0	2	0	0	3 September 2023	
Lesotho	1	0	1	0	0	26 July 2025	
Mozambique	12	0	12	0	0	16 September 2021	
Rwanda	1	0	1	0	0	12 September 2021	
Sierra Leone	4	0	4	0	0	5 September 2023	
Tanzania	1	0	1	0	0	14 September 2021	

== See also ==
- Eswatini national cricket team
- List of Eswatini women Twenty20 International cricketers
