= Associate international cricket in 2018–19 =

International cricket season

The 2018–19 Associate international cricket season was from September 2018 to April 2019. The International Cricket Council (ICC) granted Twenty20 International (T20I) status to matches between all of its Associate members from 1 July 2018 (women's teams) and 1 January 2019 (men's teams). As a result, many teams were able to play official T20I cricket for the first time. The season included all T20I/WT20I cricket series mostly involving ICC Associate members, that were played in addition to series covered in International cricket in 2018–19.

== Season overview ==
International tournaments
Start date	Tournament	Winners
20 January 2019	(Oman) 2019 ACC Western Region T20	Saudi Arabia
29 March 2019	2019 Spain Triangular T20I Series	Spain
25 April 2019	(Mexico) 2019 Central American Cricket Championship	Belize

Women's International tours
Start date	Home team	Away team	Results [Matches]	
Start date	Home team	Away team	WT20I	
3 November 2018	South Korea	China	1–2 [3]	
5 January 2019	Namibia	Zimbabwe	0–5 [5]	
26 January 2019	Nigeria	Rwanda	3–2 [5]	
1 April 2019	Namibia	Botswana	5–0 [5]	
18 April 2019	Singapore	Myanmar	0–2 [3]	
21 April 2019	Indonesia	Myanmar	2–0 [2]	
26 April 2019	Mexico	Costa Rica	2–0 [2]	
Women's international tournaments
Start date	Tournament			Winners
12 January 2019	2019 Thailand T20 Smash			Thailand
6 April 2019	(Uganda) 2019 Victoria Tri-Series			Zimbabwe

== November ==
=== China women in South Korea ===
WT20I series
No.	Date	Home captain	Away captain	Venue	Result
WT20I 512	3 November	Seungmin Song	Li Haoye	Yeonhui Cricket Ground, Incheon	China by 8 wickets
WT20I 513	4 November	Seungmin Song	Li Haoye	Yeonhui Cricket Ground, Incheon	China by 10 wickets
WT20I 514	4 November	Seungmin Song	Li Haoye	Yeonhui Cricket Ground, Incheon	South Korea by 5 wickets

== January ==
=== Zimbabwe women in Namibia ===
WT20I series
No.	Date	Home captain	Away captain	Venue	Result
WT20I 537	5 January	Yasmeen Khan	Mary-Anne Musonda	Sparta Recreational Club, Walvis Bay	Zimbabwe by 6 wickets
WT20I 538	6 January	Yasmeen Khan	Mary-Anne Musonda	Sparta Recreational Club, Walvis Bay	Zimbabwe by 8 wickets
WT20I 539	7 January	Yasmeen Khan	Mary-Anne Musonda	Sparta Recreational Club, Walvis Bay	Zimbabwe by 57 runs
WT20I 540	9 January	Yasmeen Khan	Mary-Anne Musonda	Sparta Recreational Club, Walvis Bay	Zimbabwe by 69 runs
WT20I 541	10 January	Yasmeen Khan	Mary-Anne Musonda	Sparta Recreational Club, Walvis Bay	Zimbabwe by 9 wickets

=== 2019 Thailand Women's T20 Smash ===
Pos	Team	Pld	W	L	T	NR	Pts	NRR
1	Nepal	4	4	0	0	0	8	2.077
2	United Arab Emirates	4	3	1	0	0	6	4.032
3	Malaysia	4	2	2	0	0	4	−0.367
4	Thailand A	4	1	3	0	0	2	−2.140
5	China	4	0	4	0	0	0	−3.955

Pos	Team	Pld	W	L	T	NR	Pts	NRR
1	Thailand	4	4	0	0	0	8	3.938
2	Indonesia	4	3	1	0	0	6	0.410
3	Hong Kong	4	2	2	0	0	4	−0.677
4	Myanmar	4	1	3	0	0	2	−2.050
5	Bhutan	4	0	4	0	0	0	−1.628

Round-robin
No.	Date	Team 1	Captain 1	Team 2	Captain 2	Venue	Result
WT20I 542	12 January	China	Li Haoye	Nepal	Rubina Chhetry	Asian Institute of Technology Ground, Bangkok	Nepal by 10 wickets
Match 2	12 January	United Arab Emirates	Humaira Tasneem	Thailand A	Rosenan Kanoh	Terdthai Cricket Ground, Bangkok	United Arab Emirates by 61 runs
WT20I 543	12 January	Hong Kong	Mariko Hill	Indonesia	Puji Haryanti	Asian Institute of Technology Ground, Bangkok	Indonesia by 6 wickets
WT20I 544	12 January	Myanmar	Aye Moe	Thailand	Sornnarin Tippoch	Terdthai Cricket Ground, Bangkok	Thailand by 10 wickets
WT20I 545	13 January	Indonesia	Puji Haryanti	Myanmar	Lin Htun	Asian Institute of Technology Ground, Bangkok	Indonesia by 52 runs
WT20I 546	13 January	Malaysia	Winifred Duraisingam	Nepal	Rubina Chhetry	Terdthai Cricket Ground, Bangkok	Nepal by 6 wickets
WT20I 547	13 January	Bhutan	Yeshey Wangmo	Hong Kong	Mariko Hill	Terdthai Cricket Ground, Bangkok	Hong Kong by 3 wickets
WT20I 548	13 January	United Arab Emirates	Humaira Tasneem	China	Li Haoye	Asian Institute of Technology Ground, Bangkok	United Arab Emirates by 189 runs
WT20I 549	14 January	Indonesia	Puji Haryanti	Bhutan	Yeshey Wangmo	Asian Institute of Technology Ground, Bangkok	Indonesia by 50 runs
WT20I 550	14 January	Thailand	Sornnarin Tippoch	Hong Kong	Mariko Hill	Terdthai Cricket Ground, Bangkok	Thailand by 65 runs
WT20I 551	14 January	United Arab Emirates	Humaira Tasneem	Nepal	Rubina Chhetry	Asian Institute of Technology Ground, Bangkok	Nepal by 6 wickets
Match 12	14 January	Malaysia	Winifred Duraisingam	Thailand A	Rosenan Kanoh	Terdthai Cricket Ground, Bangkok	Thailand by 34 runs
WT20I 552	15 January	Bhutan	Yeshey Wangmo	Myanmar	Lin Htun	Terdthai Cricket Ground, Bangkok	Myanmar by 7 wickets
WT20I 553	15 January	United Arab Emirates	Humaira Tasneem	Malaysia	Winifred Duraisingam	Asian Institute of Technology Ground, Bangkok	United Arab Emirates by 77 runs
WT20I 554	15 January	Thailand	Sornnarin Tippoch	Indonesia	Puji Haryanti	Asian Institute of Technology Ground, Bangkok	Thailand by 93 runs
Match 16	15 January	China	Li Haoye	Thailand A	Rosenan Kanoh	Terdthai Cricket Ground, Bangkok	Thailand A by 5 wickets
WT20I 555	16 January	China	Li Haoye	Malaysia	Winifred Duraisingam	Asian Institute of Technology Ground, Bangkok	Malaysia by 6 wickets
Match 18	16 January	Thailand A	Rosenan Kanoh	Nepal	Rubina Chhetry	Terdthai Cricket Ground, Bangkok	Nepal by 9 wickets
WT20I 556	16 January	Myanmar	Lin Htun	Hong Kong	Mariko Hill	Terdthai Cricket Ground, Bangkok	Hong Kong by 7 wickets
WT20I 557	16 January	Bhutan	Yeshey Wangmo	Thailand	Sornnarin Tippoch	Asian Institute of Technology Ground, Bangkok	Thailand by 10 wickets
Play-offs
WT20I 558	18 January	Nepal	Rubina Chhetry	Indonesia	Puji Haryanti	Terdthai Cricket Ground, Bangkok	Nepal by 92 runs
WT20I 559	18 January	Malaysia	Winifred Duraisingam	Myanmar	Lin Htun	Asian Institute of Technology Ground, Bangkok	Myanmar by 4 wickets
WT20I 560	18 January	Thailand	Sornnarin Tippoch	United Arab Emirates	Humaira Tasneem	Terdthai Cricket Ground, Bangkok	Thailand by 49 runs
Match 24	18 January	Hong Kong	Mariko Hill	Thailand A	Rosenan Kanoh	Asian Institute of Technology Ground, Bangkok	Hong Kong by 51 runs
WT20I 561	19 January	Myanmar	Lin Htun	Hong Kong	Mariko Hill	Asian Institute of Technology Ground, Bangkok	Hong Kong by 9 wickets
WT20I 562	19 January	Indonesia	Sornnarin Tippoch	United Arab Emirates	Humaira Tasneem	Terdthai Cricket Ground, Bangkok	United Arab Emirates by 9 wickets
Match 27	19 January	Malaysia	Winifred Duraisingam	Thailand A	Rosenan Kanoh	Asian Institute of Technology Ground, Bangkok	Malaysia by 84 runs
WT20I 563	19 January	Thailand	Sornnarin Tippoch	Nepal	Rubina Chhetry	Terdthai Cricket Ground, Bangkok	Thailand by 70 runs

=== 2019 ACC Western Region T20 ===
Team	P	W	L	T	NR	Pts	NRR
Qatar	4	4	0	0	0	8	+1.694
Saudi Arabia	4	2	2	0	0	4	+0.489
Bahrain	4	2	2	0	0	4	–0.035
Kuwait	4	2	2	0	0	4	–0.060
Maldives	4	0	4	0	0	0	–2.075

Round-robin
No.	Date	Team 1	Captain 1	Team 2	Captain 2	Venue	Result
T20I 719	20 January	Bahrain	Adil Hanif	Saudi Arabia	Shoaib Ali	Oman Cricket Academy Ground Turf 1, Muscat	Bahrain by 41 runs
T20I 720	20 January	Maldives	Mohamed Mahfooz	Kuwait	Mohammad Amin	Oman Cricket Academy Ground Turf 2, Muscat	Kuwait by 8 wickets
T20I 721	21 January	Maldives	Mohamed Mahfooz	Bahrain	Adil Hanif	Oman Cricket Academy Ground Turf 1, Muscat	Bahrain by 2 wickets
T20I 722	21 January	Saudi Arabia	Shoaib Ali	Qatar	Inam-ul-Haq	Oman Cricket Academy Ground Turf 2, Muscat	Qatar by 4 wickets
T20I 723	22 January	Qatar	Inam-ul-Haq	Kuwait	Mohammad Amin	Oman Cricket Academy Ground Turf 1, Muscat	Match tied (Qatar won S/O)
T20I 724	22 January	Maldives	Mohamed Mahfooz	Saudi Arabia	Shoaib Ali	Oman Cricket Academy Ground Turf 2, Muscat	Saudi Arabia by 6 wickets
T20I 725	23 January	Maldives	Mohamed Mahfooz	Qatar	Inam-ul-Haq	Oman Cricket Academy Ground Turf 1, Muscat	Qatar by 8 wickets
T20I 726	23 January	Bahrain	Adil Hanif	Kuwait	Mohammad Amin	Oman Cricket Academy Ground Turf 2, Muscat	Kuwait by 7 wickets
T20I 727	24 January	Kuwait	Mohammad Amin	Saudi Arabia	Shoaib Ali	Oman Cricket Academy Ground Turf 1, Muscat	Saudi Arabia by 7 wickets
T20I 728	24 January	Qatar	Inam-ul-Haq	Bahrain	Adil Hanif	Oman Cricket Academy Ground Turf 2, Muscat	Qatar by 48 runs
Final
T20I 729	24 January	Qatar	Inam-ul-Haq	Saudi Arabia	Shoaib Ali	Oman Cricket Academy Ground Turf 1, Muscat	Saudi Arabia by 8 wickets

=== Rwanda women in Nigeria ===
WT20I series
No.	Date	Home captain	Away captain	Venue	Result
WT20I 564	26 January	Blessing Etim	Sarah Uwera	National Stadium, Abuja	Nigeria by 4 wickets
WT20I 565	26 January	Blessing Etim	Sarah Uwera	National Stadium, Abuja	Nigeria by 5 wickets
WT20I 566	28 January	Blessing Etim	Sarah Uwera	National Stadium, Abuja	Nigeria by 7 wickets
WT20I 567	28 January	Blessing Etim	Sarah Uwera	National Stadium, Abuja	Rwanda by 5 wickets
WT20I 568	29 January	Blessing Etim	Sarah Uwera	National Stadium, Abuja	Rwanda by 7 wickets

== March ==
=== 2019 Spain Triangular T20I Series ===
	P	W	L	T	NR	Pts	NRR
Spain	6	4	0	0	2	10	+4.880
Malta	6	2	2	0	2	6	–0.689
Estonia XI	6	0	4	0	2	2	–3.721

Round-robin
No.	Date	Team 1	Captain 1	Team 2	Captain 2	Venue	Result
Match 1	29 March	Malta	Nowell Khosla	Estonia XI	Tim Heath	La Manga Club, Cartagena	Malta by 13 runs
Match 2	29 March	Estonia XI	Tim Heath	Spain	Christian Munoz-Mills	La Manga Club, Cartagena	Spain by 10 wickets
T20I 764	29 March	Malta	Nowell Khosla	Spain	Christian Munoz-Mills	La Manga Club, Cartagena	Spain by 7 wickets
Match 4	30 March	Spain	Christian Munoz-Mills	Estonia XI	Tim Heath	La Manga Club, Cartagena	Spain by 99 runs
T20I 765	30 March	Malta	Nowell Khosla	Spain	Christian Munoz-Mills	La Manga Club, Cartagena	Spain by 109 runs
Match 6	30 March	Malta	Nowell Khosla	Estonia XI	Tim Heath	La Manga Club, Cartagena	Malta by 94 runs
T20I 765a	31 March	Spain	Christian Munoz-Mills	Malta	Nowell Khosla	La Manga Club, Cartagena	Match abandoned
Match 8	31 March	Estonia XI	Tim Heath	Malta	Nowell Khosla	La Manga Club, Cartagena	Match abandoned
Match 9	31 March	Spain	Christian Munoz-Mills	Estonia XI	Tim Heath	La Manga Club, Cartagena	Match abandoned

== April ==
=== Botswana women in Namibia ===
WT20I series
No.	Date	Home captain	Away captain	Venue	Result
WT20I 605	1 April	Yasmeen Khan	Laura Mophakedi	United Ground, Windhoek	Namibia by 7 wickets
WT20I 606	2 April	Yasmeen Khan	Laura Mophakedi	United Ground, Windhoek	Namibia by 88 runs
WT20I 607	2 April	Yasmeen Khan	Laura Mophakedi	United Ground, Windhoek	Namibia by 9 wickets
WT20I 608	3 April	Yasmeen Khan	Laura Mophakedi	United Ground, Windhoek	Namibia by 86 runs
WT20I 609	3 April	Yasmeen Khan	Laura Mophakedi	United Ground, Windhoek	Namibia by 88 runs

=== 2019 Victoria Tri-Series ===
Pos	Team	Pld	W	L	T	NR	Pts	NRR
1	Zimbabwe	4	3	0	0	1	7	0.914
2	Uganda	4	2	2	0	0	4	−0.003
3	Kenya	4	0	3	0	1	1	−0.901

Source: ESPNcricinfo

Advanced to the final

Round-robin
No.	Date	Team 1	Captain 1	Team 2	Captain 2	Venue	Result
WT20I 610	6 April	Zimbabwe	Mary-Anne Musonda	Kenya	Margaret Ngoche	Lugogo Cricket Oval, Kampala	Zimbabwe by 6 runs
WT20I 611	6 April	Uganda	Kevin Awino	Kenya	Margaret Ngoche	Lugogo Cricket Oval, Kampala	Uganda by 34 runs
WT20I 612	7 April	Kenya	Margaret Ngoche	Uganda	Kevin Awino	Kyambogo Cricket Oval, Kampala	Uganda by 7 wickets
WT20I 613	7 April	Zimbabwe	Mary-Anne Musonda	Uganda	Racheal Ntono	Kyambogo Cricket Oval, Kampala	Zimbabwe by 24 runs
WT20I 613a	9 April	Kenya	Margaret Ngoche	Zimbabwe	Mary-Anne Musonda	Lugogo Cricket Oval, Kampala	Match abandoned
WT20I 614	9 April	Uganda	Kevin Awino	Zimbabwe	Mary-Anne Musonda	Lugogo Cricket Oval, Kampala	Zimbabwe by 9 wickets
Final
WT20I 615	10 April	Zimbabwe	Mary-Anne Musonda	Uganda	Kevin Awino	Lugogo Cricket Oval, Kampala	Zimbabwe by 25 runs

=== Myanmar women in Singapore ===
WT20I series
No.	Date	Home captain	Away captain	Venue	Result
WT20I 616	18 April	Shafina Mahesh	Zar Win	Indian Association Ground, Singapore	Myanmar by 10 wickets
WT20I 617	19 April	Shafina Mahesh	Zar Win	Indian Association Ground, Singapore	Myanmar by 49 runs
WT20I 618	20 April	Shafina Mahesh	Zar Win	Indian Association Ground, Singapore	No result

=== Myanmar women in Indonesia ===
WT20I series
No.	Date	Home captain	Away captain	Venue	Result
WT20I 619	23 April	Yulia Anggraeni	Zar Win	Udayana Cricket Ground, Bali	Indonesia by 73 runs
WT20I 620	25 April	Yulia Anggraeni	Zar Win	Udayana Cricket Ground, Bali	Indonesia by 63 runs

=== 2019 Central American Cricket Championship ===
Team	P	W	L	T	NR	Pts	NRR
MCC	4	4	0	0	0	8	+1.893
Belize	4	3	1	0	0	6	+1.192
Panama	4	2	2	0	0	4	+0.346
Mexico	4	1	3	0	0	2	–1.182
Costa Rica	4	0	4	0	0	0	–2.255

Round-robin
No.	Date	Team 1	Captain 1	Team 2	Captain 2	Venue	Result
T20I 766	25 April	Mexico	Tarun Sharma	Belize	Kenton Young	Reforma Athletic Club, Naucalpan	Belize by 4 wickets
T20I 767	25 April	Costa Rica	Christopher Prasad	Panama	Imran Bulbulia	Reforma Athletic Club, Naucalpan	Panama by 7 wickets
Match 3	25 April	Belize	Kenton Young	MCC	Storm Green	Reforma Athletic Club, Naucalpan	MCC by 4 wickets
T20I 768	26 April	Costa Rica	Christopher Prasad	Mexico	Tarun Sharma	Reforma Athletic Club, Naucalpan	Mexico by 3 wickets
T20I 769	26 April	Belize	Kenton Young	Panama	Imran Bulbulia	Reforma Athletic Club, Naucalpan	Belize by 9 runs
Match 6	26 April	MCC	Storm Green	Mexico	Tarun Sharma	Reforma Athletic Club, Naucalpan	MCC by 8 runs
T20I 770	27 April	Panama	Imran Bulbulia	Mexico	Tarun Sharma	Reforma Athletic Club, Naucalpan	Panama by 33 runs
T20I 771	27 April	Costa Rica	Christopher Prasad	Belize	Kenton Young	Reforma Athletic Club, Naucalpan	Belize by 5 wickets
Match 9	27 April	Panama	Imran Bulbulia	MCC	Storm Green	Reforma Athletic Club, Naucalpan	MCC by 6 wickets
Match 10	28 April	MCC	Storm Green	Costa Rica	Sudesh Pillai	Reforma Athletic Club, Naucalpan	MCC by 100 runs
Final
Match 11	28 April	MCC	Storm Green	Belize	Kenton Young	Reforma Athletic Club, Naucalpan	Belize by 5 wickets

=== Costa Rica women in Mexico ===
Central American Cricket Championship – WT20I series
No.	Date	Home captain	Away captain	Venue	Result
WT20I 621	26 April	Caroline Owen	Sofia Martinez	Las Cabellerizas, Naucalpan	Mexico by 101 runs
WT20I 622	26 April	Caroline Owen	Sofia Martinez	Las Cabellerizas, Naucalpan	Mexico by 10 wickets

== See also ==
- International cricket in 2018–19
