= Zimbabwean women's cricket team in Namibia in 2018–19 =

	Namibia women	Zimbabwe women
- Dates: 5 – 10 January 2019
Captains	Yasmeen Khan	Mary-Anne Musonda

Twenty20 International series
- Results: Zimbabwe women won the 5-match series 5–0
Most runs	Adri van der Merwe (115)	Mary-Anne Musonda (140)
Most wickets	Kayleen Green (5)	Precious Marange (6); Anesu Mushangwe (6); Nomatter Mutasa (6)

The Zimbabwe women's cricket team toured Namibia in January 2019 to play a five-match Women's Twenty20 International (WT20I) series known as the Namib Desert Challenge. These were the first matches with WT20I status to be played by Zimbabwe after the International Cricket Council announced that all matches played between women's teams of Associate Members after 1 July 2018 would have full T20I status. The venue for all of the matches was the Sparta Cricket Club Ground in Walvis Bay. Zimbabwe won the series 5–0.

The tournament provided both teams with some preparation ahead of the 2019 ICC Women's Qualifier Africa.

== WT20I series ==
=== 1st WT20I ===
5 January 2019
10:00
Scorecard

Namibia; 96/5 (20 overs)	v	Zimbabwe; 98/4 (18.1 overs)
Adri van der Merwe 41 (52); Josephine Nkomo 4/12 (4 overs)		Chipo Mugeri-Tiripano 40 (48); Kayleen Green 2/30 (4 overs)

Zimbabwe won by 6 wickets
Sparta Cricket Club Ground, Walvis Bay
Umpires: Esau Heynes (Nam) and Willem Prinsloo (Nam)

- Zimbabwe won the toss and elected to field.
- Roche Venter, Sune Wittmann (Nam), Precious Marange, Sharne Mayers, Chipo Mugeri-Tiripano, Modester Mupachikwa, Anesu Mushangwe, Mary-Anne Musonda, Nomatter Mutasa, Ashley Ndiraya, Josephine Nkomo, Loryn Phiri, Nomvelo Sibanda (Zim) all made their WT20I debuts.

=== 2nd WT20I ===
6 January 2019
10:00
Scorecard

Namibia; 77/6 (20 overs)	v	Zimbabwe; 80/2 (11.4 overs)
Adri van der Merwe 37* (58); Precious Marange 2/8 (4 overs)		Chipo Mugeri-Tiripano 31* (23); Kayleen Green 2/17 (4 overs)

Zimbabwe won by 8 wickets
Sparta Cricket Club Ground, Walvis Bay
Umpires: Esau Heynes (Nam) and Willem Prinsloo (Nam)
Player of the match: Chipo Mugeri-Tiripano (Zim)

- Zimbabwe won the toss and elected to field.

=== 3rd WT20I ===
7 January 2019
10:00
Scorecard

Zimbabwe; 136/8 (20 overs)	v	Namibia; 79/9 (20 overs)
Mary-Anne Musonda 60 (49); Jurriene Diergaardt 1/12 (3 overs)		Jurriene Diergaardt 21 (27); Loryn Phiri 2/5 (2 overs)

Zimbabwe won by 57 runs
Sparta Cricket Club Ground, Walvis Bay
Umpires: Esau Heynes (Nam) and Willem Prinsloo (Nam)
Player of the match: Mary-Anne Musonda (Zim)

- Namibia won the toss and elected to field.

=== 4th WT20I ===
9 January 2019
10:00
Scorecard

Zimbabwe; 150/2 (20 overs)	v	Namibia; 81/8 (20 overs)
Modester Mupachikwa 75* (63); Sylvia Shihepo 1/18 (2 overs)		Adri van der Merwe 28 (38); Anesu Mushangwe 3/9 (4 overs)

Zimbabwe won by 69 runs
Sparta Cricket Club Ground, Walvis Bay
Umpires: Esau Heynes (Nam) and Willem Prinsloo (Nam)

- Namibia won the toss and elected to field.
- Christabel Chatonzwa, Chiedza Mzembe and E Tshuma (Zim) all made their WT20I debuts.

=== 5th WT20I ===
10 January 2019
10:00
Scorecard

Namibia; 60 (20 overs)	v	Zimbabwe; 61/1 (9.3 overs)
Sune Wittmann 21 (29); Nomatter Mutasa 4/9 (4 overs)		Precious Marange 32* (31); Namusha Shiomwenyo 1/22 (3.3 overs)

Zimbabwe won by 9 wickets
Sparta Cricket Club Ground, Walvis Bay
Umpires: Esau Heynes (Nam) and Willem Prinsloo (Nam)

- Namibia won the toss and elected to bat.
