= International cricket in 2018–19 =

International cricket season

The 2018–19 international cricket season was from September 2018 to April 2019. 34 Test matches, 92 One Day Internationals (ODIs) and 74 Twenty20 International (T20Is), as well as 28 Women's One Day Internationals (WODIs) and 130 Women's Twenty20 Internationals (WT20Is), were played during this period. The season started with India leading the Test cricket rankings, England leading the ODI rankings and Pakistan leading the Twenty20 rankings. In October 2018, the International Cricket Council (ICC) introduced separate rankings for women's ODIs and T20Is for the first time, with Australia women leading both tables.

All men's Twenty20 matches played between member sides after 1 January 2019 were eligible for full international status to be classified as T20Is, as per a decision made by the ICC in April 2018 (the same had applied to women's Twenty20 matches since 1 July 2018). The first men's T20Is to be classified as such under these new rules took place at the 2019 ACC Western Region T20.

Men's international cricket started off with the 2018 Asia Cup Qualifier, which saw Hong Kong qualify for the 2018 Asia Cup. The Asia Cup started nine days later and was won by India, who beat Bangladesh in the final. Other highlights included New Zealand beating Pakistan in an away Test series for the first time in 49 years, India winning a Test series against Australia in Australia for the first time ever, and Sri Lanka becoming the first side from Asia to win a Test series against South Africa in South Africa. The last Test match of Bangladesh's tour of New Zealand was cancelled due to the Christchurch mosque shootings. In March 2019, Afghanistan won their first Test match, beating Ireland by seven wickets in their one-off Test in India.

On 20 October, the ICC announced a major revamp to the 2023 Cricket World Cup qualification process. Following the conclusion of the Division Three and Division Two tournaments, the World Cricket League (WCL) was scrapped and the new qualification pathway consisted of the following tournaments: CWC Super League (comprising the 12 Full Members and the Netherlands), CWC League 2 (comprising Scotland, Nepal, the United Arab Emirates, and the top four finishers the Division Two tournament), CWC Challenge League (the next best 12 nations based on final rankings in the WCL), CWC Play-Off, and the CWC Qualifier. The 2018 ICC World Cricket League Division Three tournament, which was held in Oman, saw Oman and the United States promoted to Division Two, while Singapore, Kenya, Denmark and Uganda were placed in the CWC Challenge League. The Division Two tournament, was held in Namibia in April. Oman, Namibia, the United States and Papua New Guinea all finished in the top four places, and gained ODI status in the process.

The qualification process for the 2020 ICC T20 World Cup started during the season. The East Asia-Pacific (EAP) Group B Subregional Qualifier, held in the Philippines, saw the Philippines qualify for the EAP Regional Qualifier. The Asia Eastern Sub Region Qualifier, held in Malaysia, saw Nepal, Singapore, and Malaysia qualify for the Asia Region Qualifier. The Africa Southern Sub Region Qualifier, held in Botswana, saw Botswana and Namibia qualify for the Africa Region Qualifier. The Americas Northern Sub Region Qualifier, held in the United States, saw Canada and the United States qualify for the America Region Qualifier. Papua New Guinea won the Regional Final of the EAP Qualifier to become the first team to qualify for the 2019 ICC T20 World Cup Qualifier tournament.

Women's international cricket started off with India's tour of Sri Lanka. The highlight of women's cricket for the 2018–19 season was the Women's World Twenty20, which was won by Australia. The 2019 ICC Women's Qualifier Asia saw Thailand qualify for both the 2019 ICC Women's World Twenty20 Qualifier and 2020 Women's Cricket World Cup Qualifier.

== Season overview ==
Men's international tours
Start date	Home team	Away team	Results [Matches]			
Start date	Home team	Away team	Test	ODI	T20I	LA
30 September 2018	South Africa	Zimbabwe	—	3–0 [3]	2–0 [3]	—
4 October 2018	India	West Indies	2–0 [2]	3–1 [5]	3–0 [3]	—
7 October 2018	(United Arab Emirates) Pakistan	Australia	1–0 [2]	—	3–0 [3]	—
10 October 2018	Sri Lanka	England	0–3 [3]	1–3 [5]	0–1 [1]	—
21 October 2018	Bangladesh	Zimbabwe	1–1 [2]	3–0 [3]	—	—
22 October 2018	United Arab Emirates	Australia	—	—	0–1 [1]	—
31 October 2018	(United Arab Emirates) Pakistan	New Zealand	1–2 [3]	1–1 [3]	3–0 [3]	—
4 November 2018	Australia	South Africa	—	1–2 [3]	0–1 [1]	—
21 November 2018	Australia	India	1–2 [4]	1–2 [3]	1–1 [3]	—
22 November 2018	Bangladesh	West Indies	2–0 [2]	2–1 [3]	1–2 [3]	—
15 December 2018	New Zealand	Sri Lanka	1–0 [2]	3–0 [3]	1–0 [1]	—
26 December 2018	South Africa	Pakistan	3–0 [3]	3–2 [5]	2–1 [3]	—
23 January 2019	New Zealand	India	—	1–4 [5]	2–1 [3]	—
23 January 2019	West Indies	England	2–1 [3]	2–2 [5]	0–3 [3]	—
24 January 2019	Australia	Sri Lanka	2–0 [2]	—	—	—
25 January 2019	United Arab Emirates	Nepal	—	1–2 [3]	1–2 [3]	—
13 February 2019	New Zealand	Bangladesh	2–0 [3]	3–0 [3]	—	—
13 February 2019	South Africa	Sri Lanka	0–2 [2]	5–0 [5]	3–0 [3]	—
19 February 2019	Oman	Scotland	—	—	—	1–2 [3]
21 February 2019	(India) Afghanistan	Ireland	1–0 [1]	2–2 [5]	3–0 [3]	—
24 February 2019	India	Australia	—	2–3 [5]	0–2 [2]	—
15 March 2019	United Arab Emirates	United States	—	—	1–0 [2]	—
22 March 2019	(United Arab Emirates) Pakistan	Australia	—	0–5 [5]	—	—
March 2019 (Note: Zimbabwe were scheduled to play India in March 2019, but the tour did not take place.)	India	Zimbabwe	[1]	[3]	—	—
10 April 2019	Zimbabwe	United Arab Emirates	—	4–0 [4]	—	—
Men's international tournaments
Start date	Tournament				Winners	
29 August 2018	(Malaysia) 2018 Asia Cup Qualifier				Hong Kong	
15 September 2018	(United Arab Emirates) 2018 Asia Cup				India	
9 November 2018	(Oman) 2018 ICC World Cricket League Division Three				Oman	
13 February 2019	2018–19 Oman Quadrangular Series				Scotland	
22 March 2019	(Papua New Guinea) 2019 ICC T20 World Cup East Asia-Pacific Qualifier				Papua New Guinea	
20 April 2019	(Namibia) 2019 ICC World Cricket League Division Two				Namibia	

Women's international tours
Start date	Home team	Away team	Results [Matches]		
Start date	Home team	Away team	WTest	WODI	WT20I
11 September 2018	Sri Lanka	India	—	1–2 [3]	0–4 [5]
16 September 2018	West Indies	South Africa	—	1–1 [3]	2–2 [5]
29 September 2018	Australia	New Zealand	—	3–0 [3]	3–0 [3]
2 October 2018	Bangladesh	Pakistan	—	1–0 [1]	0–3 [4]
18 October 2018	(Malaysia) Pakistan	Australia	—	0–3 [3]	0–3 [3]
24 January 2019	New Zealand	India	—	1–2 [3]	3–0 [3]
31 January 2019	(United Arab Emirates) Pakistan	West Indies	—	2–1 [3]	1–2 [3]
1 February 2019	South Africa	Sri Lanka	—	3–0 [3]	3–0 [3]
22 February 2019	India	England	—	2–1 [3]	0–3 [3]
16 March 2019	Sri Lanka	England	—	0–3 [3]	0–3 [3]
Women's international tournaments
Start date	Tournament			Winners	
9 November 2018	(Cricket West Indies) 2018 ICC Women's World Twenty20			Australia	
18 February 2019	(Thailand) 2019 ICC Women's Qualifier Asia			Thailand	

== Rankings ==
The following were the rankings at the beginning of the season.

ICC Test Championship 11 September 2018
Rank	Team	Matches	Points	Rating
1	India	35	4016	115
2	South Africa	35	3712	106
3	Australia	33	3499	106
4	England	45	4722	105
5	New Zealand	23	2354	102
6	Sri Lanka	38	3668	97
7	Pakistan	21	1853	88
8	West Indies	29	2235	77
9	Bangladesh	19	1268	67
10	Zimbabwe	8	12	2

ICC ODI Championship 1 September 2018
Rank	Team	Matches	Points	Rating
1	England	51	6470	127
2	India	48	5819	121
3	New Zealand	41	4602	112
4	South Africa	39	4275	110
5	Pakistan	37	3844	104
6	Australia	37	3699	100
7	Bangladesh	27	2477	92
8	Sri Lanka	48	3818	80
9	West Indies	32	2217	69
10	Afghanistan	31	1924	62
11	Zimbabwe	42	2242	53
12	Ireland	23	904	39
13	Scotland	16	535	33
14	United Arab Emirates	14	298	21

ICC T20I Championship 23 August 2018
Rank	Team	Matches	Points	Rating
1	Pakistan	30	3972	132
2	India	37	4601	124
3	Australia	21	2570	122
4	England	21	2448	117
5	New Zealand	22	2542	116
6	South Africa	19	2093	110
7	West Indies	21	2219	106
8	Afghanistan	27	2490	92
9	Sri Lanka	28	2451	88
10	Bangladesh	27	2066	77
11	Scotland	15	927	62
12	Zimbabwe	18	1006	56
13	United Arab Emirates	12	608	51
14	Netherlands	12	598	50
15	Hong Kong	10	420	42
16	Oman	7	270	39
17	Ireland	19	638	34

ICC Women's ODI Rankings 11 October 2018
Rank	Team	Matches	Points	Rating
1	Australia	19	2659	140
2	England	24	2963	123
3	India	27	3212	119
4	New Zealand	27	3126	116
5	South Africa	36	3538	98
6	West Indies	19	1754	92
7	Pakistan	20	1464	73
8	Sri Lanka	23	1335	58
9	Bangladesh	13	632	49
10	Ireland	10	211	21

ICC Women's T20I Rankings 11 October 2018
Rank	Team	Matches	Points	Rating
1	Australia	19	5316	280
2	New Zealand	25	6928	277
3	England	19	5239	276
4	West Indies	19	4928	259
5	India	27	6733	249
6	South Africa	21	5107	243
7	Pakistan	24	5451	227
8	Sri Lanka	23	4770	207
9	Bangladesh	27	5209	193
10	Ireland	13	2447	188
11	Scotland	8	1199	150
12	Thailand	28	4076	146
13	Zimbabwe	14	2029	145
14	United Arab Emirates	16	2081	130
15	Uganda	20	2532	127
16	Kenya	8	965	121
Only the top 16 teams are shown

== September ==
=== 2018 Asia Cup Qualifier ===
Pos	Team	Pld	W	L	T	NR	Pts	NRR	
1	United Arab Emirates	5	4	1	0	0	8	1.289	Advanced to the final
2	Hong Kong (Q)	5	3	1	0	1	7	1.530	Advanced to the final
3	Oman	5	3	1	0	1	7	0.583	
4	Nepal	5	2	3	0	0	4	−0.250	
5	Malaysia	5	1	4	0	0	2	−0.995	
6	Singapore	5	1	4	0	0	2	−2.175	

Source: ESPNCricinfo
(Q) Advance to 2018 Asia Cup

Group stage
No.	Date	Team 1	Captain 1	Team 2	Captain 2	Venue	Result
1st Match	29 August	Malaysia	Ahmad Faiz	Hong Kong	Anshuman Rath	Kinrara Academy Oval, Bandar Kinrara	Malaysia by 3 wickets
2nd Match	29 August	Nepal	Paras Khadka	Oman	Zeeshan Maqsood	Bayuemas Oval, Pandamaran	Oman by 7 wickets
3rd Match	29 August	United Arab Emirates	Rohan Mustafa	Singapore	Chetan Suryawanshi	UKM Cricket Oval, Bangi	United Arab Emirates by 215 runs
ODI 4034	30 August	United Arab Emirates	Rohan Mustafa	Nepal	Paras Khadka	Kinrara Academy Oval, Bandar Kinrara	United Arab Emirates by 78 runs
5th Match	30 August	Hong Kong	Anshuman Rath	Singapore	Chetan Suryawanshi	Bayuemas Oval, Pandamaran	Hong Kong by 5 wickets
6th Match	30 August	Malaysia	Ahmad Faiz	Oman	Zeeshan Maqsood	UKM Cricket Oval, Bangi	Oman by 2 wickets
7th Match	1 September	Oman	Zeeshan Maqsood	Singapore	Chetan Suryawanshi	Kinrara Academy Oval, Bandar Kinrara	Oman by 8 wickets
8th Match	1 September	Malaysia	Ahmad Faiz	Nepal	Paras Khadka	Bayuemas Oval, Pandamaran	Nepal by 19 runs
9th Match	1 September	United Arab Emirates	Rohan Mustafa	Hong Kong	Anshuman Rath	UKM Cricket Oval, Bangi	Hong Kong by 182 runs
10th Match	2 September	Hong Kong	Anshuman Rath	Oman	Zeeshan Maqsood	Kinrara Academy Oval, Bandar Kinrara	No result
11th Match	2 September	Malaysia	Ahmad Faiz	United Arab Emirates	Rohan Mustafa	Bayuemas Oval, Pandamaran	United Arab Emirates by 8 wickets
12th Match	2 September	Nepal	Paras Khadka	Singapore	Chetan Suryawanshi	UKM Cricket Oval, Bangi	Nepal by 4 wickets
13th Match	4 September	Malaysia	Ahmad Faiz	Singapore	Chetan Suryawanshi	Kinrara Academy Oval, Bandar Kinrara	Singapore by 29 runs
14th Match	4 September	United Arab Emirates	Rohan Mustafa	Oman	Zeeshan Maqsood	Bayuemas Oval, Pandamaran	United Arab Emirates by 13 runs
15th Match	4 September	Nepal	Paras Khadka	Hong Kong	Anshuman Rath	UKM Cricket Oval, Bangi	Hong Kong by 3 wickets
Final
16th Match	6 September	United Arab Emirates	Rohan Mustafa	Hong Kong	Anshuman Rath	Kinrara Academy Oval, Bandar Kinrara	Hong Kong by 2 wickets (DLS)

=== India women in Sri Lanka ===
2017–20 ICC Women's Championship – WODI series
No.	Date	Home captain	Away captain	Venue	Result
WODI 1124	11 September	Chamari Athapaththu	Mithali Raj	Galle International Stadium, Galle	India by 9 wickets
WODI 1125	13 September	Chamari Athapaththu	Mithali Raj	Galle International Stadium, Galle	India by 7 runs
WODI 1126	16 September	Chamari Athapaththu	Mithali Raj	FTZ Sports Complex, Katunayake	Sri Lanka by 3 wickets
WT20I series
No.	Date	Home captain	Away captain	Venue	Result
WT20I 494	19 September	Chamari Athapaththu	Harmanpreet Kaur	FTZ Sports Complex, Katunayake	India by 13 runs
WT20I 495	21 September	Chamari Athapaththu	Harmanpreet Kaur	Colts Cricket Club Ground, Colombo	No result
WT20I 496	22 September	Chamari Athapaththu	Harmanpreet Kaur	Colombo Cricket Club Ground, Colombo	India by 5 wickets
WT20I 497	24 September	Chamari Athapaththu	Harmanpreet Kaur	Colombo Cricket Club Ground, Colombo	India by 7 wickets
WT20I 499	25 September	Chamari Athapaththu	Harmanpreet Kaur	FTZ Sports Complex, Katunayake	India by 51 runs

=== 2018 Asia Cup ===
Pos	Team	Pld	W	L	T	NR	Pts	NRR
1	India	2	2	0	0	0	4	1.474
2	Pakistan	2	1	1	0	0	2	0.284
3	Hong Kong	2	0	2	0	0	0	−1.748

Source: ESPNCricinfo

Pos	Team	Pld	W	L	T	NR	Pts	NRR
1	Afghanistan	2	2	0	0	0	4	2.270
2	Bangladesh	2	1	1	0	0	2	0.010
3	Sri Lanka	2	0	2	0	0	0	−2.280

Source: ESPNCricinfo

Group stage
No.	Date	Team 1	Captain 1	Team 2	Captain 2	Venue	Result
ODI 4036	15 September	Bangladesh	Mashrafe Mortaza	Sri Lanka	Angelo Mathews	Dubai International Cricket Stadium, Dubai	Bangladesh by 137 runs
ODI 4037	16 September	Pakistan	Sarfaraz Ahmed	Hong Kong	Anshuman Rath	Dubai International Cricket Stadium, Dubai	Pakistan by 8 wickets
ODI 4038	17 September	Afghanistan	Asghar Afghan	Sri Lanka	Angelo Mathews	Sheikh Zayed Cricket Stadium, Abu Dhabi	Afghanistan by 91 runs
ODI 4039	18 September	India	Rohit Sharma	Hong Kong	Anshuman Rath	Dubai International Cricket Stadium, Dubai	India by 26 runs
ODI 4040	19 September	India	Rohit Sharma	Pakistan	Sarfaraz Ahmed	Dubai International Cricket Stadium, Dubai	India by 8 wickets
ODI 4041	20 September	Afghanistan	Asghar Afghan	Bangladesh	Mashrafe Mortaza	Sheikh Zayed Cricket Stadium, Abu Dhabi	Afghanistan by 136 runs

==== Super Four ====
Pos	Team	Pld	W	L	T	NR	Pts	NRR
1	India	3	2	0	1	0	5	0.863
2	Bangladesh	3	2	1	0	0	4	−0.156
3	Pakistan	3	1	2	0	0	2	−0.599
4	Afghanistan	3	0	2	1	0	1	−0.044

Source: ESPNCricinfo

Super Four
No.	Date	Team 1	Captain 1	Team 2	Captain 2	Venue	Result
ODI 4042	21 September	Bangladesh	Mashrafe Mortaza	India	Rohit Sharma	Dubai International Cricket Stadium, Dubai	India by 7 wickets
ODI 4043	21 September	Afghanistan	Asghar Afghan	Pakistan	Sarfaraz Ahmed	Sheikh Zayed Cricket Stadium, Abu Dhabi	Pakistan by 3 wickets
ODI 4044	23 September	India	Rohit Sharma	Pakistan	Sarfaraz Ahmed	Dubai International Cricket Stadium, Dubai	India by 9 wickets
ODI 4045	23 September	Afghanistan	Asghar Afghan	Bangladesh	Mashrafe Mortaza	Sheikh Zayed Cricket Stadium, Abu Dhabi	Bangladesh by 3 runs
ODI 4046	25 September	Afghanistan	Asghar Afghan	India	MS Dhoni	Dubai International Cricket Stadium, Dubai	Match tied
ODI 4047	26 September	Bangladesh	Mashrafe Mortaza	Pakistan	Sarfaraz Ahmed	Sheikh Zayed Cricket Stadium, Abu Dhabi	Bangladesh by 37 runs
Final
ODI 4048	28 September	India	Rohit Sharma	Bangladesh	Mashrafe Mortaza	Dubai International Cricket Stadium, Dubai	India by 3 wickets

=== South Africa women in West Indies ===
2017–20 ICC Women's Championship – WODI series
No.	Date	Home captain	Away captain	Venue	Result
WODI 1127	16 September	Stafanie Taylor	Dane van Niekerk	Kensington Oval, Bridgetown	South Africa by 40 runs
WODI 1128	19 September	Stafanie Taylor	Dane van Niekerk	Kensington Oval, Bridgetown	No result
WODI 1129	22 September	Stafanie Taylor	Dane van Niekerk	Kensington Oval, Bridgetown	West Indies by 115 runs
WT20I series
No.	Date	Home captain	Away captain	Venue	Result
WT20I 498	24 September	Stafanie Taylor	Chloe Tryon	Kensington Oval, Bridgetown	West Indies by 17 runs
WT20I 500	28 September	Stafanie Taylor	Dane van Niekerk	Brian Lara Cricket Academy, Trinidad	West Indies by 9 wickets
WT20I 501a	30 September	Stafanie Taylor	Dane van Niekerk	Brian Lara Cricket Academy, Trinidad	Match abandoned
WT20I 504	4 October	Stafanie Taylor	Chloe Tryon	Brian Lara Cricket Academy, Trinidad	South Africa by 8 wickets
WT20I 508	6 October	Stafanie Taylor	Chloe Tryon	Brian Lara Cricket Academy, Trinidad	South Africa by 3 wickets

=== New Zealand women in Australia ===
WT20I series
No.	Date	Home captain	Away captain	Venue	Result
WT20I 501	29 September	Meg Lanning	Amy Satterthwaite	North Sydney Oval, Sydney	Australia by 6 wickets
WT20I 502	1 October	Meg Lanning	Amy Satterthwaite	Allan Border Field, Brisbane	Australia by 6 wickets
WT20I 506	5 October	Meg Lanning	Amy Satterthwaite	Manuka Oval, Canberra	Australia by 9 wickets
2017–20 ICC Women's Championship – WODI series
No.	Date	Home captain	Away captain	Venue	Result
WODI 1143	22 February	Meg Lanning	Amy Satterthwaite	WACA Ground, Perth	Australia by 5 runs
WODI 1145	24 February	Meg Lanning	Amy Satterthwaite	Karen Rolton Oval, Adelaide	Australia by 95 runs
WODI 1148	3 March	Meg Lanning	Amy Satterthwaite	Junction Oval, Melbourne	Australia by 7 wickets

=== Zimbabwe in South Africa ===
ODI series
No.	Date	Home captain	Away captain	Venue	Result
ODI 4049	30 September	JP Duminy	Hamilton Masakadza	Diamond Oval, Kimberley	South Africa by 5 wickets
ODI 4050	3 October	JP Duminy	Hamilton Masakadza	Mangaung Oval, Bloemfontein	South Africa by 120 runs
ODI 4051	6 October	Faf du Plessis	Hamilton Masakadza	Boland Park, Paarl	South Africa by 4 wickets
T20I series
No.	Date	Home captain	Away captain	Venue	Result
T20I 698	9 October	Faf du Plessis	Hamilton Masakadza	Buffalo Park, East London	South Africa by 34 runs
T20I 699	12 October	Faf du Plessis	Hamilton Masakadza	Senwes Park, Potchefstroom	South Africa by 6 wickets
T20I 699a	14 October	Faf du Plessis	Hamilton Masakadza	Willowmoore Park, Benoni	Match abandoned

== October ==
=== Pakistan women in Bangladesh ===
WT20I series
No.	Date	Home captain	Away captain	Venue	Result
WT20I 502a	2 October	Salma Khatun	Javeria Khan	Sheikh Kamal International Stadium, Cox's Bazar	Match abandoned
WT20I 503	3 October	Salma Khatun	Javeria Khan	Sheikh Kamal International Stadium, Cox's Bazar	Pakistan by 58 runs
WT20I 505	5 October	Salma Khatun	Javeria Khan	Sheikh Kamal International Stadium, Cox's Bazar	Pakistan by 7 wickets
WT20I 507	6 October	Salma Khatun	Javeria Khan	Sheikh Kamal International Stadium, Cox's Bazar	Pakistan by 7 wickets
Only WODI
No.	Date	Home captain	Away captain	Venue	Result
WODI 1130	8 October	Rumana Ahmed	Javeria Khan	Sheikh Kamal International Stadium, Cox's Bazar	Bangladesh by 6 wickets

=== West Indies in India ===
Test series
No.	Date	Home captain	Away captain	Venue	Result
Test 2319	4–8 October	Virat Kohli	Kraigg Brathwaite	Saurashtra Cricket Association Stadium, Rajkot	India by an innings and 272 runs
Test 2321	12–16 October	Virat Kohli	Jason Holder	Rajiv Gandhi International Cricket Stadium, Hyderabad	India by 10 wickets
ODI series
No.	Date	Home captain	Away captain	Venue	Result
ODI 4056	21 October	Virat Kohli	Jason Holder	Barsapara Cricket Stadium, Guwahati	India by 8 wickets
ODI 4059	24 October	Virat Kohli	Jason Holder	Dr. Y. S. Rajasekhara Reddy ACA–VDCA Cricket Stadium, Visakhapatnam	Match tied
ODI 4062	27 October	Virat Kohli	Jason Holder	Maharashtra Cricket Association Stadium, Pune	West Indies by 43 runs
ODI 4063	29 October	Virat Kohli	Jason Holder	Brabourne Stadium, Mumbai	India by 224 runs
ODI 4064	1 November	Virat Kohli	Jason Holder	Greenfield International Stadium, Thiruvananthapuram	India by 9 wickets
T20I series
No.	Date	Home captain	Away captain	Venue	Result
T20I 707	4 November	Rohit Sharma	Carlos Brathwaite	Eden Gardens, Kolkata	India by 5 wickets
T20I 709	6 November	Rohit Sharma	Carlos Brathwaite	Bharat Ratna Shri Atal Bihari Vajpayee Ekana Cricket Stadium, Lucknow	India by 71 runs
T20I 710	11 November	Rohit Sharma	Carlos Brathwaite	M. A. Chidambaram Stadium, Chennai	India by 6 wickets

=== Australia in the United Arab Emirates ===
Test series
No.	Date	Home captain	Away captain	Venue	Result
Test 2320	7–11 October	Sarfaraz Ahmed	Tim Paine	Dubai International Cricket Stadium, Dubai	Match drawn
Test 2322	16–20 October	Sarfaraz Ahmed	Tim Paine	Sheikh Zayed Cricket Stadium, Abu Dhabi	Pakistan by 373 runs
T20I series
No.	Date	Home captain	Away captain	Venue	Result
T20I 701	24 October	Sarfaraz Ahmed	Aaron Finch	Sheikh Zayed Cricket Stadium, Abu Dhabi	Pakistan by 66 runs
T20I 702	26 October	Sarfaraz Ahmed	Aaron Finch	Dubai International Cricket Stadium, Dubai	Pakistan by 11 runs
T20I 704	28 October	Sarfaraz Ahmed	Aaron Finch	Dubai International Cricket Stadium, Dubai	Pakistan by 33 runs

=== England in Sri Lanka ===
ODI series
No.	Date	Home captain	Away captain	Venue	Result
ODI 4052	10 October	Dinesh Chandimal	Eoin Morgan	Rangiri Dambulla International Stadium, Dambulla	No result
ODI 4053	13 October	Dinesh Chandimal	Eoin Morgan	Rangiri Dambulla International Stadium, Dambulla	England by 31 runs (DLS)
ODI 4054	17 October	Dinesh Chandimal	Eoin Morgan	Pallekele International Cricket Stadium, Kandy	England by 7 wickets
ODI 4055	20 October	Dinesh Chandimal	Eoin Morgan	Pallekele International Cricket Stadium, Kandy	England by 18 runs (DLS)
ODI 4058	23 October	Dinesh Chandimal	Jos Buttler	R. Premadasa International Cricket Stadium, Colombo	Sri Lanka by 219 runs (DLS)
Only T20I
No.	Date	Home captain	Away captain	Venue	Result
T20I 703	27 October	Thisara Perera	Eoin Morgan	R. Premadasa International Cricket Stadium, Colombo	England by 30 runs
Test series
No.	Date	Home captain	Away captain	Venue	Result
Test 2324	6–10 November	Dinesh Chandimal	Joe Root	Galle International Stadium, Galle	England by 211 runs
Test 2326	14–18 November	Suranga Lakmal	Joe Root	Pallekele International Cricket Stadium, Kandy	England by 57 runs
Test 2329	23–27 November	Suranga Lakmal	Joe Root	Sinhalese Sports Club, Colombo	England by 42 runs

=== Australia women against Pakistan women in Malaysia ===
2017–20 ICC Women's Championship – WODI series
No.	Date	Home captain	Away captain	Venue	Result
WODI 1131	18 October	Javeria Khan	Meg Lanning	Kinrara Academy Oval, Bandar Kinrara	Australia by 5 wickets (DLS)
WODI 1132	20 October	Javeria Khan	Meg Lanning	Kinrara Academy Oval, Bandar Kinrara	Australia by 150 runs
WODI 1133	22 October	Javeria Khan	Meg Lanning	Kinrara Academy Oval, Bandar Kinrara	Australia by 89 runs
WT20I series
No.	Date	Home captain	Away captain	Venue	Result
WT20I 509	25 October	Javeria Khan	Meg Lanning	Kinrara Academy Oval, Bandar Kinrara	Australia by 64 runs
WT20I 510	27 October	Javeria Khan	Meg Lanning	Kinrara Academy Oval, Bandar Kinrara	Australia by 6 wickets
WT20I 511	29 October	Javeria Khan	Rachael Haynes	Kinrara Academy Oval, Bandar Kinrara	Australia by 9 wickets

=== Zimbabwe in Bangladesh ===
ODI series
No.	Date	Home captain	Away captain	Venue	Result
ODI 4057	21 October	Mashrafe Mortaza	Hamilton Masakadza	Sher-e-Bangla National Cricket Stadium, Dhaka	Bangladesh by 28 runs
ODI 4060	24 October	Mashrafe Mortaza	Hamilton Masakadza	Zohur Ahmed Chowdhury Stadium, Chittagong	Bangladesh by 7 wickets
ODI 4061	26 October	Mashrafe Mortaza	Hamilton Masakadza	Zohur Ahmed Chowdhury Stadium, Chittagong	Bangladesh by 7 wickets
Test series
No.	Date	Home captain	Away captain	Venue	Result
Test 2323	3–7 November	Mahmudullah	Hamilton Masakadza	Sylhet International Cricket Stadium, Sylhet	Zimbabwe by 151 runs
Test 2325	11–15 November	Mahmudullah	Hamilton Masakadza	Sher-e-Bangla National Cricket Stadium, Dhaka	Bangladesh by 218 runs

=== Australia vs United Arab Emirates ===
T20I match
No.	Date	Home captain	Away captain	Venue	Result
T20I 700	22 October	Rohan Mustafa	Aaron Finch	Sheikh Zayed Stadium Nursery 2, Abu Dhabi	Australia by 7 wickets

=== New Zealand vs Pakistan in United Arab Emirates ===
T20I series
No.	Date	Home captain	Away captain	Venue	Result
T20I 705	31 October	Sarfaraz Ahmed	Kane Williamson	Sheikh Zayed Cricket Stadium, Abu Dhabi	Pakistan by 2 runs
T20I 706	2 November	Sarfaraz Ahmed	Kane Williamson	Dubai International Cricket Stadium, Dubai	Pakistan by 6 wickets
T20I 708	4 November	Sarfaraz Ahmed	Kane Williamson	Dubai International Cricket Stadium, Dubai	Pakistan by 47 runs
ODI series
No.	Date	Home captain	Away captain	Venue	Result
ODI 4066	7 November	Sarfaraz Ahmed	Kane Williamson	Sheikh Zayed Cricket Stadium, Abu Dhabi	New Zealand by 47 runs
ODI 4068	9 November	Sarfaraz Ahmed	Kane Williamson	Sheikh Zayed Cricket Stadium, Abu Dhabi	Pakistan by 6 wickets
ODI 4070	11 November	Sarfaraz Ahmed	Tom Latham	Dubai International Cricket Stadium, Dubai	No result
Test series
No.	Date	Home captain	Away captain	Venue	Result
Test 2327	16–20 November	Sarfaraz Ahmed	Kane Williamson	Sheikh Zayed Cricket Stadium, Abu Dhabi	New Zealand by 4 runs
Test 2330	24–28 November	Sarfaraz Ahmed	Kane Williamson	Dubai International Cricket Stadium, Dubai	Pakistan by an innings and 16 runs
Test 2332	3–7 December	Sarfaraz Ahmed	Kane Williamson	Sheikh Zayed Cricket Stadium, Abu Dhabi	New Zealand by 123 runs

== November ==
=== South Africa in Australia ===
ODI series
No.	Date	Home captain	Away captain	Venue	Result
ODI 4065	4 November	Aaron Finch	Faf du Plessis	Perth Stadium, Perth	South Africa by 6 wickets
ODI 4067	9 November	Aaron Finch	Faf du Plessis	Adelaide Oval, Adelaide	Australia by 7 runs
ODI 4069	11 November	Aaron Finch	Faf du Plessis	Bellerive Oval, Hobart	South Africa by 40 runs
Only T20I
No.	Date	Home captain	Away captain	Venue	Result
T20I 711	17 November	Aaron Finch	Faf du Plessis	Carrara Stadium, Gold Coast	South Africa by 21 runs

=== 2018 ICC World Cricket League Division Three ===
Pos	Team	Pld	W	L	T	NR	Pts	NRR	
1	Oman (H)	5	5	0	0	0	10	0.927	Promoted to Division Two for 2019
2	United States	5	4	1	0	0	8	1.380	Promoted to Division Two for 2019
3	Singapore	5	2	3	0	0	4	−0.093	Relegated to ICC Cricket World Cup Challenge League
4	Kenya	5	2	3	0	0	4	−0.750	Relegated to ICC Cricket World Cup Challenge League
5	Denmark	5	1	4	0	0	2	−0.663	Relegated to ICC Cricket World Cup Challenge League
6	Uganda	5	1	4	0	0	2	−0.904	Relegated to ICC Cricket World Cup Challenge League

(H) Host

Group stage
No.	Date	Team 1	Captain 1	Team 2	Captain 2	Venue	Result
1st Match	9 November	Oman	Zeeshan Maqsood	Kenya	Shem Ngoche	Al Emarat Cricket Stadium, Muscat	Oman by 5 wickets
2nd Match	9 November	Uganda	Roger Mukasa	Denmark	Hamid Shah	Al Emarat Cricket Stadium, Muscat	Uganda by 5 wickets
3rd Match	10 November	United States	Saurabh Netravalkar	Uganda	Roger Mukasa	Al Emarat Cricket Stadium, Muscat	United States by 54 runs
4th Match	10 November	Oman	Zeeshan Maqsood	Singapore	Chetan Suryawanshi	Al Emarat Cricket Stadium, Muscat	Oman by 4 wickets
5th Match	12 November	United States	Saurabh Netravalkar	Kenya	Shem Ngoche	Al Emarat Cricket Stadium, Muscat	United States by 158 runs
6th Match	12 November	Singapore	Chetan Suryawanshi	Denmark	Hamid Shah	Al Emarat Cricket Stadium, Muscat	Singapore by 94 runs
7th Match	13 November	Denmark	Hamid Shah	Oman	Zeeshan Maqsood	Al Emarat Cricket Stadium, Muscat	Oman by 3 wickets
8th Match	13 November	Kenya	Shem Ngoche	Uganda	Brian Masaba	Al Emarat Cricket Stadium, Muscat	Kenya by 6 wickets
9th Match	15 November	Uganda	Roger Mukasa	Singapore	Chetan Suryawanshi	Al Emarat Cricket Stadium, Muscat	Singapore by 63 runs
10th Match	15 November	United States	Saurabh Netravalkar	Denmark	Hamid Shah	Al Emarat Cricket Stadium, Muscat	United States by 16 runs
11th Match	16 November	United States	Saurabh Netravalkar	Oman	Zeeshan Maqsood	Al Emarat Cricket Stadium, Muscat	Oman by 4 wickets
12th Match	16 November	Singapore	Chetan Suryawanshi	Kenya	Shem Ngoche	Al Emarat Cricket Stadium, Muscat	Kenya by 12 runs
13th Match	18 November	Kenya	Shem Ngoche	Denmark	Hamid Shah	Al Emarat Cricket Stadium, Muscat	Denmark by 9 wickets
14th Match	18 November	Oman	Zeeshan Maqsood	Uganda	Roger Mukasa	Al Emarat Cricket Stadium, Muscat	Oman by 10 wickets
15th Match	19 November	Singapore	Chetan Suryawanshi	United States	Saurabh Netravalkar	Al Emarat Cricket Stadium, Muscat	United States by 5 wickets

=== 2018 ICC Women's World Twenty20 ===
Pos	Team	Pld	W	L	T	NR	Pts	NRR
1	West Indies	4	4	0	0	0	8	2.241
2	England	4	2	1	0	1	5	1.317
3	South Africa	4	2	2	0	0	4	−0.277
4	Sri Lanka	4	1	2	0	1	3	−1.171
5	Bangladesh	4	0	4	0	0	0	−1.989

Source: ESPNCricinfo

Pos	Team	Pld	W	L	T	NR	Pts	NRR
1	India	4	4	0	0	0	8	1.827
2	Australia	4	3	1	0	0	6	1.515
3	New Zealand	4	2	2	0	0	4	1.031
4	Pakistan	4	1	3	0	0	2	−0.987
5	Ireland	4	0	4	0	0	0	−3.525

Source: ESPNCricinfo

Group stage
No.	Date	Team 1	Captain 1	Team 2	Captain 2	Venue	Result
WT20I 515	9 November	New Zealand	Amy Satterthwaite	India	Harmanpreet Kaur	Guyana National Stadium, Providence	India by 34 runs
WT20I 516	9 November	Australia	Meg Lanning	Pakistan	Javeria Khan	Guyana National Stadium, Providence	Australia by 52 runs
WT20I 517	9 November	West Indies	Stafanie Taylor	Bangladesh	Salma Khatun	Guyana National Stadium, Providence	West Indies by 60 runs
WT20I 517a	10 November	England	Heather Knight	Sri Lanka	Chamari Athapaththu	Daren Sammy Cricket Ground, Gros Islet	Match abandoned
WT20I 518	11 November	India	Harmanpreet Kaur	Pakistan	Javeria Khan	Guyana National Stadium, Providence	India by 7 wickets
WT20I 519	11 November	Australia	Meg Lanning	Ireland	Laura Delany	Guyana National Stadium, Providence	Australia by 9 wickets
WT20I 520	12 November	England	Heather Knight	Bangladesh	Salma Khatun	Daren Sammy Cricket Ground, Gros Islet	England by 7 wickets (DLS)
WT20I 521	12 November	Sri Lanka	Chamari Athapaththu	South Africa	Dane van Niekerk	Daren Sammy Cricket Ground, Gros Islet	South Africa by 7 wickets
WT20I 522	13 November	Pakistan	Javeria Khan	Ireland	Laura Delany	Guyana National Stadium, Providence	Pakistan by 38 runs
WT20I 523	13 November	Australia	Meg Lanning	New Zealand	Amy Satterthwaite	Guyana National Stadium, Providence	Australia by 33 runs
WT20I 524	14 November	Sri Lanka	Chamari Athapaththu	Bangladesh	Salma Khatun	Daren Sammy Cricket Ground, Gros Islet	Sri Lanka by 25 runs
WT20I 525	14 November	West Indies	Stafanie Taylor	South Africa	Dane van Niekerk	Daren Sammy Cricket Ground, Gros Islet	West Indies by 31 runs
WT20I 526	15 November	India	Harmanpreet Kaur	Ireland	Laura Delany	Guyana National Stadium, Providence	India by 52 runs
WT20I 527	15 November	New Zealand	Amy Satterthwaite	Pakistan	Javeria Khan	Guyana National Stadium, Providence	New Zealand by 54 runs
WT20I 528	16 November	England	Heather Knight	South Africa	Dane van Niekerk	Daren Sammy Cricket Ground, Gros Islet	England by 7 wickets
WT20I 529	16 November	West Indies	Stafanie Taylor	Sri Lanka	Chamari Athapaththu	Daren Sammy Cricket Ground, Gros Islet	West Indies by 83 runs
WT20I 530	17 November	India	Harmanpreet Kaur	Australia	Meg Lanning	Guyana National Stadium, Providence	India by 48 runs
WT20I 531	17 November	New Zealand	Amy Satterthwaite	Ireland	Laura Delany	Guyana National Stadium, Providence	New Zealand by 8 wickets
WT20I 532	18 November	West Indies	Stafanie Taylor	England	Heather Knight	Daren Sammy Cricket Ground, Gros Islet	West Indies by 4 wickets
WT20I 533	18 November	South Africa	Dane van Niekerk	Bangladesh	Salma Khatun	Daren Sammy Cricket Ground, Gros Islet	South Africa by 30 runs
Finals
WT20I 534	22 November	West Indies	Stafanie Taylor	Australia	Meg Lanning	Sir Vivian Richards Stadium, North Sound	Australia by 71 runs
WT20I 535	22 November	England	Heather Knight	India	Harmanpreet Kaur	Sir Vivian Richards Stadium, North Sound	England by 8 wickets
WT20I 536	24 November	Australia	Meg Lanning	England	Heather Knight	Sir Vivian Richards Stadium, North Sound	Australia by 8 wickets

=== India in Australia ===
T20I series
No.	Date	Home captain	Away captain	Venue	Result
T20I 712	21 November	Aaron Finch	Virat Kohli	The Gabba, Brisbane	Australia by 4 runs (DLS)
T20I 713	23 November	Aaron Finch	Virat Kohli	Melbourne Cricket Ground, Melbourne	No result
T20I 714	25 November	Aaron Finch	Virat Kohli	Sydney Cricket Ground, Sydney	India by 6 wickets
Border–Gavaskar Trophy – Test series
No.	Date	Home captain	Away captain	Venue	Result
Test 2333	6–10 December	Tim Paine	Virat Kohli	Adelaide Oval, Adelaide	India by 31 runs
Test 2334	14–18 December	Tim Paine	Virat Kohli	Perth Stadium, Perth	Australia by 146 runs
Test 2337	26–30 December	Tim Paine	Virat Kohli	Melbourne Cricket Ground, Melbourne	India by 137 runs
Test 2339	3–7 January	Tim Paine	Virat Kohli	Sydney Cricket Ground, Sydney	Match drawn
ODI series
No.	Date	Home captain	Away captain	Venue	Result
ODI 4077	12 January	Aaron Finch	Virat Kohli	Sydney Cricket Ground, Sydney	Australia by 34 runs
ODI 4078	15 January	Aaron Finch	Virat Kohli	Adelaide Oval, Adelaide	India by 6 wickets
ODI 4079	18 January	Aaron Finch	Virat Kohli	Melbourne Cricket Ground, Melbourne	India by 7 wickets

=== West Indies in Bangladesh ===
Test series
No.	Date	Home captain	Away captain	Venue	Result
Test 2328	22–26 November	Shakib Al Hasan	Kraigg Brathwaite	Zohur Ahmed Chowdhury Stadium, Chittagong	Bangladesh by 64 runs
Test 2331	30 November–4 December	Shakib Al Hasan	Kraigg Brathwaite	Sher-e-Bangla National Cricket Stadium, Dhaka	Bangladesh by an innings and 184 runs
ODI series
No.	Date	Home captain	Away captain	Venue	Result
ODI 4071	9 December	Mashrafe Mortaza	Rovman Powell	Sher-e-Bangla National Cricket Stadium, Dhaka	Bangladesh by 5 wickets
ODI 4072	11 December	Mashrafe Mortaza	Rovman Powell	Sher-e-Bangla National Cricket Stadium, Dhaka	West Indies by 4 wickets
ODI 4073	14 December	Mashrafe Mortaza	Rovman Powell	Sylhet International Cricket Stadium, Sylhet	Bangladesh by 8 wickets
T20I series
No.	Date	Home captain	Away captain	Venue	Result
T20I 715	17 December	Shakib Al Hasan	Carlos Brathwaite	Sylhet International Cricket Stadium, Sylhet	West Indies by 8 wickets
T20I 716	20 December	Shakib Al Hasan	Carlos Brathwaite	Sher-e-Bangla National Cricket Stadium, Dhaka	Bangladesh by 36 runs
T20I 717	22 December	Shakib Al Hasan	Carlos Brathwaite	Sher-e-Bangla National Cricket Stadium, Dhaka	West Indies by 50 runs

== December ==
=== Sri Lanka in New Zealand ===
Test series
No.	Date	Home captain	Away captain	Venue	Result
Test 2335	15–19 December	Kane Williamson	Dinesh Chandimal	Basin Reserve, Wellington	Match drawn
Test 2336	26–30 December	Kane Williamson	Dinesh Chandimal	Hagley Oval, Christchurch	New Zealand by 423 runs
ODI series
No.	Date	Home captain	Away captain	Venue	Result
ODI 4074	3 January	Kane Williamson	Lasith Malinga	Bay Oval, Mount Maunganui	New Zealand by 45 runs
ODI 4075	5 January	Kane Williamson	Lasith Malinga	Bay Oval, Mount Maunganui	New Zealand by 21 runs
ODI 4076	8 January	Kane Williamson	Lasith Malinga	Saxton Oval, Nelson	New Zealand by 115 runs
Only T20I
No.	Date	Home captain	Away captain	Venue	Result
T20I 718	11 January	Tim Southee	Lasith Malinga	Eden Park, Auckland	New Zealand by 35 runs

=== Pakistan in South Africa ===
Test series
No.	Date	Home captain	Away captain	Venue	Result
Test 2338	26–30 December	Faf du Plessis	Sarfaraz Ahmed	Centurion Park, Centurion	South Africa by 6 wickets
Test 2340	3–7 January	Faf du Plessis	Sarfaraz Ahmed	Newlands Cricket Ground, Cape Town	South Africa by 9 wickets
Test 2341	11–15 January	Dean Elgar	Sarfaraz Ahmed	Wanderers Stadium, Johannesburg	South Africa by 107 runs
ODI series
No.	Date	Home captain	Away captain	Venue	Result
ODI 4080	19 January	Faf du Plessis	Sarfaraz Ahmed	St. George's Park, Port Elizabeth	Pakistan by 5 wickets
ODI 4081	22 January	Faf du Plessis	Sarfaraz Ahmed	Kingsmead Cricket Ground, Durban	South Africa by 5 wickets
ODI 4084	25 January	Faf du Plessis	Sarfaraz Ahmed	Centurion Park, Centurion	South Africa by 13 runs (DLS)
ODI 4087	27 January	Faf du Plessis	Shoaib Malik	Wanderers Stadium, Johannesburg	Pakistan by 8 wickets
ODI 4090	30 January	Faf du Plessis	Shoaib Malik	Newlands Cricket Ground, Cape Town	South Africa by 7 wickets
T20I series
No.	Date	Home captain	Away captain	Venue	Result
T20I 732	1 February	Faf du Plessis	Shoaib Malik	Newlands Cricket Ground, Cape Town	South Africa by 6 runs
T20I 734	3 February	David Miller	Shoaib Malik	Wanderers Stadium, Johannesburg	South Africa by 7 runs
T20I 736	6 February	David Miller	Shoaib Malik	Centurion Park, Centurion	Pakistan by 27 runs

== January ==
=== India in New Zealand ===
ODI series
No.	Date	Home captain	Away captain	Venue	Result
ODI 4082	23 January	Kane Williamson	Virat Kohli	McLean Park, Napier	India by 8 wickets (DLS)
ODI 4085	26 January	Kane Williamson	Virat Kohli	Bay Oval, Mount Maunganui	India by 90 runs
ODI 4088	28 January	Kane Williamson	Virat Kohli	Bay Oval, Mount Maunganui	India by 7 wickets
ODI 4091	31 January	Kane Williamson	Rohit Sharma	Seddon Park, Hamilton	New Zealand by 8 wickets
ODI 4092	3 February	Kane Williamson	Rohit Sharma	Wellington Regional Stadium, Wellington	India by 35 runs
T20I series
No.	Date	Home captain	Away captain	Venue	Result
T20I 735	6 February	Kane Williamson	Rohit Sharma	Wellington Regional Stadium, Wellington	New Zealand by 80 runs
T20I 737	8 February	Kane Williamson	Rohit Sharma	Eden Park, Auckland	India by 7 wickets
T20I 738	10 February	Kane Williamson	Rohit Sharma	Seddon Park, Hamilton	New Zealand by 4 runs

=== England in West Indies ===
Wisden Trophy – Test series
No.	Date	Home captain	Away captain	Venue	Result
Test 2342	23–27 January	Jason Holder	Joe Root	Kensington Oval, Bridgetown	West Indies by 381 runs
Test 2344	31 January–4 February	Jason Holder	Joe Root	Sir Vivian Richards Stadium, North Sound	West Indies by 10 wickets
Test 2346	9–13 February	Kraigg Brathwaite	Joe Root	Daren Sammy Cricket Ground, Gros Islet	England by 232 runs
ODI series
No.	Date	Home captain	Away captain	Venue	Result
ODI 4096	20 February	Jason Holder	Eoin Morgan	Kensington Oval, Bridgetown	England by 6 wickets
ODI 4097	22 February	Jason Holder	Eoin Morgan	Kensington Oval, Bridgetown	West Indies by 26 runs
ODI 4098	25 February	Jason Holder	Eoin Morgan	National Cricket Stadium, Grenada	No result
ODI 4099	27 February	Jason Holder	Eoin Morgan	National Cricket Stadium, Grenada	England by 29 runs
ODI 4103	2 March	Jason Holder	Eoin Morgan	Daren Sammy Cricket Ground, Gros Islet	West Indies by 7 wickets
T20I series
No.	Date	Home captain	Away captain	Venue	Result
T20I 750	5 March	Jason Holder	Eoin Morgan	Daren Sammy Cricket Ground, Gros Islet	England by 4 wickets
T20I 751	8 March	Jason Holder	Eoin Morgan	Warner Park, Basseterre	England by 137 runs
T20I 752	10 March	Jason Holder	Eoin Morgan	Warner Park, Basseterre	England by 8 wickets

=== India women in New Zealand ===
2017–20 ICC Women's Championship – WODI series
No.	Date	Home captain	Away captain	Venue	Result
WODI 1134	24 January	Amy Satterthwaite	Mithali Raj	McLean Park, Napier	India by 9 wickets
WODI 1135	29 January	Amy Satterthwaite	Mithali Raj	Bay Oval, Mount Maunganui	India by 8 wickets
WODI 1136	1 February	Amy Satterthwaite	Mithali Raj	Seddon Park, Hamilton	New Zealand by 8 wickets
WT20I series
No.	Date	Home captain	Away captain	Venue	Result
WT20I 574	6 February	Amy Satterthwaite	Harmanpreet Kaur	Wellington Regional Stadium, Wellington	New Zealand by 23 runs
WT20I 576	8 February	Amy Satterthwaite	Harmanpreet Kaur	Eden Park, Auckland	New Zealand by 4 wickets
WT20I 577	10 February	Amy Satterthwaite	Harmanpreet Kaur	Seddon Park, Hamilton	New Zealand by 2 runs

=== Sri Lanka in Australia ===
Warne-Muralidaran Trophy – Test series
No.	Date	Home captain	Away captain	Venue	Result
Test 2343	24–28 January	Tim Paine	Dinesh Chandimal	The Gabba, Brisbane	Australia by an innings and 40 runs
Test 2345	1–5 February	Tim Paine	Dinesh Chandimal	Manuka Oval, Canberra	Australia by 366 runs

=== Nepal in United Arab Emirates ===
ODI series
No.	Date	Home captain	Away captain	Venue	Result
ODI 4083	25 January	Mohammad Naveed	Paras Khadka	ICC Academy Ground, Dubai	United Arab Emirates by 3 wickets
ODI 4086	26 January	Mohammad Naveed	Paras Khadka	ICC Academy Ground, Dubai	Nepal by 145 runs
ODI 4089	28 January	Mohammad Naveed	Paras Khadka	ICC Academy Ground, Dubai	Nepal by 4 wickets
T20I series
T20I 730	31 January	Mohammad Naveed	Paras Khadka	ICC Academy Ground, Dubai	United Arab Emirates by 21 runs
T20I 731	1 February	Mohammad Naveed	Paras Khadka	ICC Academy Ground, Dubai	Nepal by 4 wickets
T20I 733	3 February	Mohammad Naveed	Paras Khadka	ICC Academy Ground, Dubai	Nepal by 14 runs

=== West Indies women in Pakistan and UAE ===
WT20I series
No.	Date	Home captain	Away captain	Venue	Result
WT20I 569	31 January	Bismah Maroof	Merissa Aguilleira	Southend Club Cricket Stadium, Karachi	West Indies by 71 runs
WT20I 570	1 February	Bismah Maroof	Merissa Aguilleira	Southend Club Cricket Stadium, Karachi	Match tied (West Indies won S/O)
WT20I 572	3 February	Bismah Maroof	Merissa Aguilleira	Southend Club Cricket Stadium, Karachi	Pakistan by 12 runs
2017–20 ICC Women's Championship – WODI series
No.	Date	Home captain	Away captain	Venue	Result
WODI 1137	7 February	Javeria Khan	Stafanie Taylor	Dubai International Cricket Stadium, Dubai	West Indies by 146 runs
WODI 1138	9 February	Bismah Maroof	Stafanie Taylor	ICC Academy Ground, Dubai	Pakistan by 34 runs
WODI 1139	11 February	Bismah Maroof	Stafanie Taylor	ICC Academy Ground, Dubai	Pakistan by 4 wickets

== February ==
=== Sri Lanka women in South Africa ===
WT20I series
No.	Date	Home captain	Away captain	Venue	Result
WT20I 571	1 February	Dane van Niekerk	Chamari Athapaththu	Newlands Cricket Ground, Cape Town	South Africa by 7 wickets
WT20I 573	3 February	Dane van Niekerk	Chamari Athapaththu	Wanderers Stadium, Johannesburg	South Africa by 2 wickets
WT20I 575	6 February	Dane van Niekerk	Chamari Athapaththu	Centurion Park, Centurion	South Africa by 39 runs
2017–20 ICC Women's Championship – WODI series
No.	Date	Home captain	Away captain	Venue	Result
WODI 1140	11 February	Dane van Niekerk	Chamari Athapaththu	Senwes Park, Potchefstroom	South Africa by 7 runs
WODI 1141	14 February	Suné Luus	Chamari Athapaththu	Senwes Park, Potchefstroom	South Africa by 30 runs (DLS)
WODI 1142	17 February	Suné Luus	Chamari Athapaththu	Senwes Park, Potchefstroom	South Africa by 6 wickets

=== Bangladesh in New Zealand ===
The third and final Test match of the tour was cancelled due to the Christchurch mosque shootings.

ODI series
No.	Date	Home captain	Away captain	Venue	Result
ODI 4093	13 February	Kane Williamson	Mashrafe Mortaza	McLean Park, Napier	New Zealand by 8 wickets
ODI 4094	16 February	Kane Williamson	Mashrafe Mortaza	Hagley Oval, Christchurch	New Zealand by 8 wickets
ODI 4095	20 February	Tom Latham	Mashrafe Mortaza	University Oval, Dunedin	New Zealand by 88 runs
Test series
No.	Date	Home captain	Away captain	Venue	Result
Test 2349	28 February–4 March	Kane Williamson	Mahmudullah	Seddon Park, Hamilton	New Zealand by an innings and 52 runs
Test 2350	8–12 March	Kane Williamson	Mahmudullah	Basin Reserve, Wellington	New Zealand by an innings and 12 runs
Test 2351a	16–20 March	Tim Southee	Mahmudullah	Hagley Oval, Christchurch	Match cancelled

=== 2018–19 Oman Quadrangular Series ===
Pos	Team	Pld	W	L	T	NR	Pts	NRR
1	Scotland	3	2	1	0	0	4	0.877
2	Netherlands	3	2	1	0	0	4	0.207
3	Ireland	3	2	1	0	0	4	0.033
4	Oman (H)	3	0	3	0	0	0	−1.100

(H) Host

Round-robin
No.	Date	Team 1	Captain 1	Team 2	Captain 2	Venue	Result
T20I 739	13 February	Scotland	Kyle Coetzer	Netherlands	Pieter Seelaar	Oman Cricket Academy Ground Turf 1, Muscat	Netherlands by 7 wickets
T20I 740	13 February	Ireland	Paul Stirling	Oman	Ajay Lalcheta	Oman Cricket Academy Ground Turf 1, Muscat	Ireland by 15 runs
T20I 741	15 February	Oman	Ajay Lalcheta	Netherlands	Pieter Seelaar	Oman Cricket Academy Ground Turf 1, Muscat	Netherlands by 8 wickets
T20I 742	15 February	Ireland	Paul Stirling	Scotland	Kyle Coetzer	Oman Cricket Academy Ground Turf 1, Muscat	Scotland by 6 wickets
T20I 743	17 February	Ireland	Paul Stirling	Netherlands	Pieter Seelaar	Oman Cricket Academy Ground Turf 1, Muscat	Ireland by 1 wicket
T20I 744	17 February	Oman	Ajay Lalcheta	Scotland	Kyle Coetzer	Oman Cricket Academy Ground Turf 1, Muscat	Scotland by 7 wickets

=== Sri Lanka in South Africa ===
Test series
No.	Date	Home captain	Away captain	Venue	Result
Test 2347	13–17 February	Faf du Plessis	Dimuth Karunaratne	Kingsmead Cricket Ground, Durban	Sri Lanka by 1 wicket
Test 2348	21–25 February	Faf du Plessis	Dimuth Karunaratne	St. George's Park, Port Elizabeth	Sri Lanka by 8 wickets
ODI series
No.	Date	Home captain	Away captain	Venue	Result
ODI 4104	3 March	Faf du Plessis	Lasith Malinga	Wanderers Stadium, Johannesburg	South Africa by 8 wickets
ODI 4107	6 March	Faf du Plessis	Lasith Malinga	Centurion Park, Centurion	South Africa by 113 runs
ODI 4112	10 March	Faf du Plessis	Lasith Malinga	Kingsmead Cricket Ground, Durban	South Africa by 71 runs (DLS)
ODI 4114	13 March	Faf du Plessis	Lasith Malinga	St. George's Park, Port Elizabeth	South Africa by 6 wickets
ODI 4115	16 March	Faf du Plessis	Lasith Malinga	Newlands Cricket Ground, Cape Town	South Africa by 41 runs (DLS)
T20I series
No.	Date	Home captain	Away captain	Venue	Result
T20I 755	19 March	Faf du Plessis	Lasith Malinga	Newlands Cricket Ground, Cape Town	Match tied (South Africa won S/O)
T20I 758	22 March	JP Duminy	Lasith Malinga	Centurion Park, Centurion	South Africa by 16 runs
T20I 763	24 March	JP Duminy	Lasith Malinga	Wanderers Stadium, Johannesburg	South Africa by 45 runs (DLS)

=== 2019 ICC Women's Qualifier Asia ===
Pos	Team	Pld	W	L	T	NR	Pts	NRR	
1	Thailand (H)	6	6	0	0	0	12	3.268	Advanced to qualifying tournament
2	Nepal	6	5	1	0	0	10	0.564	Eliminated
3	United Arab Emirates	6	4	2	0	0	8	1.089	Eliminated
4	China	6	3	3	0	0	6	0.337	Eliminated
5	Hong Kong	6	2	4	0	0	4	−0.509	Eliminated
6	Malaysia	6	1	5	0	0	2	−1.568	Eliminated
7	Kuwait	6	0	6	0	0	0	−3.342	Eliminated

(H) Host

Round-robin
No.	Date	Team 1	Captain 1	Team 2	Captain 2	Venue	Result
WT20I 578	18 February	Thailand	Sornnarin Tippoch	China	Huang Zhuo	Terdthai Cricket Ground, Bangkok	Thailand by 6 wickets
WT20I 579	18 February	Kuwait	Maryam Omar	Malaysia	Winifred Duraisingam	Asian Institute of Technology Ground, Bangkok	Malaysia by 63 runs
WT20I 580	18 February	Hong Kong	Mariko Hill	United Arab Emirates	Humaira Tasneem	Asian Institute of Technology Ground, Bangkok	United Arab Emirates by 21 runs
WT20I 581	19 February	Malaysia	Winifred Duraisingam	Nepal	Rubina Chhetry	Terdthai Cricket Ground, Bangkok	Nepal by 34 runs
WT20I 582	19 February	China	Huang Zhuo	Hong Kong	Mariko Hill	Terdthai Cricket Ground, Bangkok	China by 1 wicket
WT20I 583	19 February	Kuwait	Maryam Omar	United Arab Emirates	Humaira Tasneem	Asian Institute of Technology Ground, Bangkok	United Arab Emirates by 86 runs
WT20I 584	21 February	Malaysia	Winifred Duraisingam	United Arab Emirates	Humaira Tasneem	Terdthai Cricket Ground, Bangkok	United Arab Emirates by 86 runs
WT20I 585	21 February	Thailand	Sornnarin Tippoch	Nepal	Rubina Chhetry	Asian Institute of Technology Ground, Bangkok	Thailand by 57 runs
WT20I 586	21 February	China	Huang Zhuo	Kuwait	Maryam Omar	Asian Institute of Technology Ground, Bangkok	China by 9 wickets
WT20I 587	22 February	Nepal	Rubina Chhetry	United Arab Emirates	Humaira Tasneem	Terdthai Cricket Ground, Bangkok	Nepal by 7 wickets
WT20I 588	22 February	Thailand	Sornnarin Tippoch	Hong Kong	Mariko Hill	Asian Institute of Technology Ground, Bangkok	Thailand by 82 runs
WT20I 589	22 February	China	Huang Zhuo	Malaysia	Winifred Duraisingam	Terdthai Cricket Ground, Bangkok	China by 8 wickets
WT20I 590	24 February	China	Huang Zhuo	United Arab Emirates	Humaira Tasneem	Terdthai Cricket Ground, Bangkok	United Arab Emirates won by 27 runs
WT20I 591	24 February	Thailand	Sornnarin Tippoch	Kuwait	Maryam Omar	Asian Institute of Technology Ground, Bangkok	Thailand by 9 wickets
WT20I 592	24 February	Hong Kong	Mariko Hill	Nepal	Rubina Chhetry	Asian Institute of Technology Ground, Bangkok	Nepal by 4 wickets
WT20I 593	25 February	Thailand	Sornnarin Tippoch	Malaysia	Winifred Duraisingam	Terdthai Cricket Ground, Bangkok	Thailand by 87 runs
WT20I 594	25 February	China	Huang Zhuo	Nepal	Rubina Chhetry	Terdthai Cricket Ground, Bangkok	Nepal by 5 runs
WT20I 595	25 February	Hong Kong	Mariko Hill	Kuwait	Maryam Omar	Asian Institute of Technology Ground, Bangkok	Hong Kong by 9 wickets
WT20I 596	27 February	Hong Kong	Mariko Hill	Malaysia	Winifred Duraisingam	Terdthai Cricket Ground, Bangkok	Hong Kong by 5 wickets
WT20I 597	27 February	Kuwait	Maryam Omar	Nepal	Rubina Chhetry	Asian Institute of Technology Ground, Bangkok	Nepal by 30 runs
WT20I 598	27 February	Thailand	Sornnarin Tippoch	United Arab Emirates	Humaira Tasneem	Asian Institute of Technology Ground, Bangkok	Thailand by 50 runs

=== Scotland in Oman ===
List A series
No.	Date	Home captain	Away captain	Venue	Result
1st List A	19 February	Ajay Lalcheta	Kyle Coetzer	Al Emarat Cricket Stadium, Muscat	Scotland by 10 wickets
2nd List A	20 February	Khawar Ali	Kyle Coetzer	Al Emarat Cricket Stadium, Muscat	Oman by 93 runs
3rd List A	22 February	Khawar Ali	Kyle Coetzer	Al Emarat Cricket Stadium, Muscat	Scotland by 15 runs

=== Ireland vs Afghanistan in India ===
T20I series
No.	Date	Home captain	Away captain	Venue	Result
T20I 745	21 February	Asghar Afghan	Paul Stirling	Rajiv Gandhi International Cricket Stadium, Dehradun	Afghanistan by 5 wickets
T20I 746	23 February	Asghar Afghan	Paul Stirling	Rajiv Gandhi International Cricket Stadium, Dehradun	Afghanistan by 84 runs
T20I 747	24 February	Asghar Afghan	Paul Stirling	Rajiv Gandhi International Cricket Stadium, Dehradun	Afghanistan by 32 runs
ODI series
No.	Date	Home captain	Away captain	Venue	Result
ODI 4100	28 February	Asghar Afghan	William Porterfield	Rajiv Gandhi International Cricket Stadium, Dehradun	Afghanistan by 5 wickets
ODI 4101	2 March	Asghar Afghan	William Porterfield	Rajiv Gandhi International Cricket Stadium, Dehradun	No result
ODI 4105	5 March	Asghar Afghan	William Porterfield	Rajiv Gandhi International Cricket Stadium, Dehradun	Ireland by 4 wickets
ODI 4108	8 March	Asghar Afghan	William Porterfield	Rajiv Gandhi International Cricket Stadium, Dehradun	Afghanistan by 109 runs
ODI 4110	10 March	Asghar Afghan	William Porterfield	Rajiv Gandhi International Cricket Stadium, Dehradun	Ireland by 5 wickets
Only Test
No.	Date	Home captain	Away captain	Venue	Result
Test 2351	15–19 March	Asghar Afghan	William Porterfield	Rajiv Gandhi International Cricket Stadium, Dehradun	Afghanistan by 7 wickets

=== England women in India ===
2017–20 ICC Women's Championship – WODI series
No.	Date	Home captain	Away captain	Venue	Result
WODI 1144	22 February	Mithali Raj	Heather Knight	Wankhede Stadium, Mumbai	India by 66 runs
WODI 1146	25 February	Mithali Raj	Heather Knight	Wankhede Stadium, Mumbai	India by 7 wickets
WODI 1147	28 February	Mithali Raj	Heather Knight	Wankhede Stadium, Mumbai	England by 2 wickets
WT20I series
No.	Date	Home captain	Away captain	Venue	Result
WT20I 599	4 March	Smriti Mandhana	Heather Knight	Barsapara Stadium, Guwahati	England by 41 runs
WT20I 600	7 March	Smriti Mandhana	Heather Knight	Barsapara Stadium, Guwahati	England by 5 wickets
WT20I 601	9 March	Smriti Mandhana	Heather Knight	Barsapara Stadium, Guwahati	England by 1 run

=== Australia in India ===
T20I series
No.	Date	Home captain	Away captain	Venue	Result
T20I 748	24 February	Virat Kohli	Aaron Finch	Dr. Y. S. Rajasekhara Reddy ACA–VDCA Cricket Stadium, Visakhapatnam	Australia by 3 wickets
T20I 749	27 February	Virat Kohli	Aaron Finch	M.Chinnaswamy Stadium, Bengaluru	Australia by 7 wickets
ODI series
No.	Date	Home captain	Away captain	Venue	Result
ODI 4102	2 March	Virat Kohli	Aaron Finch	Rajiv Gandhi International Cricket Stadium, Hyderabad	India by 6 wickets
ODI 4106	5 March	Virat Kohli	Aaron Finch	Vidarbha Cricket Association Stadium, Nagpur	India by 8 runs
ODI 4109	8 March	Virat Kohli	Aaron Finch	JSCA International Stadium Complex, Ranchi	Australia by 32 runs
ODI 4111	10 March	Virat Kohli	Aaron Finch	Punjab Cricket Association IS Bindra Stadium, Mohali	Australia by 4 wickets
ODI 4113	13 March	Virat Kohli	Aaron Finch	Feroz Shah Kotla Ground, Delhi	Australia by 35 runs

== March ==
=== United States in United Arab Emirates ===
T20I series
No.	Date	Home captain	Away captain	Venue	Result
T20I 753	15 March	Mohammad Naveed	Saurabh Netravalkar	ICC Academy Ground, Dubai	No result
T20I 754	16 March	Mohammad Naveed	Saurabh Netravalkar	ICC Academy Ground, Dubai	United Arab Emirates by 24 runs

=== England women in Sri Lanka ===
2017–20 ICC Women's Championship – WODI series
No.	Date	Home captain	Away captain	Venue	Result
WODI 1148	16 March	Chamari Athapaththu	Heather Knight	Mahinda Rajapaksa International Cricket Stadium, Sooriyawewa	England by 154 runs (DLS)
WODI 1149	18 March	Chamari Athapaththu	Heather Knight	Mahinda Rajapaksa International Cricket Stadium, Sooriyawewa	England by 6 wickets
WODI 1150	21 March	Chamari Athapaththu	Heather Knight	FTZ Sports Complex, Katunayake	England by 8 wickets
WT20I series
No.	Date	Home captain	Away captain	Venue	Result
WT20I 602	24 March	Chamari Athapaththu	Heather Knight	P. Sara Oval, Colombo	England by 8 wickets
WT20I 603	26 March	Chamari Athapaththu	Heather Knight	P. Sara Oval, Colombo	England by 8 wickets
WT20I 604	28 March	Chamari Athapaththu	Heather Knight	P. Sara Oval, Colombo	England by 96 runs

=== 2019 ICC T20 World Cup East Asia-Pacific Qualifier ===
Pos	Team	Pld	W	L	T	NR	Pts	NRR	
1	Papua New Guinea (H)	4	3	0	0	1	7	5.499	Qualify to 2019 T20 World Cup Qualifier
2	Philippines	4	1	2	0	1	3	−4.133	
3	Vanuatu	4	1	3	0	0	2	−1.063	

(H) Host

Round-robin
No.	Date	Team 1	Captain 1	Team 2	Captain 2	Venue	Result
T20I 756	22 March	Papua New Guinea	Assad Vala	Philippines	Jonathan Hill	Amini Park, Port Moresby	Papua New Guinea by 133 runs
T20I 757	22 March	Papua New Guinea	Assad Vala	Vanuatu	Andrew Mansale	Amini Park, Port Moresby	Papua New Guinea by 8 wickets
T20I 759	23 March	Philippines	Jonathan Hill	Vanuatu	Andrew Mansale	Amini Park, Port Moresby	Vanuatu by 64 runs
T20I 760	23 March	Papua New Guinea	Assad Vala	Philippines	Jonathan Hill	Amini Park, Port Moresby	No result
T20I 761	24 March	Vanuatu	Andrew Mansale	Philippines	Jonathan Hill	Amini Park, Port Moresby	Philippines by 10 runs
T20I 762	24 March	Papua New Guinea	Assad Vala	Vanuatu	Andrew Mansale	Amini Park, Port Moresby	Papua New Guinea by 10 wickets

=== Australia vs Pakistan in United Arab Emirates ===
ODI series
No.	Date	Home captain	Away captain	Venue	Result
ODI 4116	22 March	Shoaib Malik	Aaron Finch	Sharjah Cricket Stadium, Sharjah	Australia by 8 wickets
ODI 4117	24 March	Shoaib Malik	Aaron Finch	Sharjah Cricket Stadium, Sharjah	Australia by 8 wickets
ODI 4118	27 March	Shoaib Malik	Aaron Finch	Sheikh Zayed Cricket Stadium, Abu Dhabi	Australia by 80 runs
ODI 4119	29 March	Imad Wasim	Aaron Finch	Dubai International Cricket Stadium, Dubai	Australia by 6 runs
ODI 4120	31 March	Imad Wasim	Aaron Finch	Dubai International Cricket Stadium, Dubai	Australia by 20 runs

=== Zimbabwe in India ===
Zimbabwe were scheduled to tour India to play one Test and three ODI matches. However, the dates clashed with the 2019 Indian Premier League, and the series was postponed.

== April ==
=== United Arab Emirates in Zimbabwe ===
ODI series
No.	Date	Home captain	Away captain	Venue	Result
ODI 4121	10 April	Peter Moor	Mohammad Naveed	Harare Sports Club, Harare	Zimbabwe by 7 wickets
ODI 4122	12 April	Peter Moor	Mohammad Naveed	Harare Sports Club, Harare	Zimbabwe by 4 runs (DLS)
ODI 4123	14 April	Peter Moor	Mohammad Naveed	Harare Sports Club, Harare	Zimbabwe by 131 runs
ODI 4124	16 April	Peter Moor	Mohammad Naveed	Harare Sports Club, Harare	Zimbabwe by 3 wickets (DLS)

=== 2019 ICC World Cricket League Division Two ===
Pos	Team	Pld	W	L	T	NR	Pts	NRR	
1	Oman	5	4	1	0	0	8	−0.048	Assigned to 2019–23 ICC Cricket World Cup League 2
2	Namibia (H)	5	3	2	0	0	6	1.397	Assigned to 2019–23 ICC Cricket World Cup League 2
3	United States	5	3	2	0	0	6	0.709	Assigned to 2019–23 ICC Cricket World Cup League 2
4	Papua New Guinea	5	2	3	0	0	4	−0.403	Assigned to 2019–23 ICC Cricket World Cup League 2
5	Canada	5	2	3	0	0	4	−0.415	Assigned to 2019–22 ICC Cricket World Cup Challenge League
6	Hong Kong	5	1	4	0	0	2	−1.044	Assigned to 2019–22 ICC Cricket World Cup Challenge League

(H) Host

Group stage
No.	Date	Team 1	Captain 1	Team 2	Captain 2	Venue	Result
1st Match	20 April	Namibia	Gerhard Erasmus	Papua New Guinea	Assad Vala	Wanderers Cricket Ground, Windhoek	Namibia by 3 wickets
2nd Match	20 April	Canada	Davy Jacobs	Hong Kong	Anshuman Rath	Wanderers Affies Park, Windhoek	Hong Kong by 7 wickets
3rd Match	20 April	Oman	Zeeshan Maqsood	United States	Saurabh Netravalkar	United Ground, Windhoek	Oman by 6 wickets
4th Match	21 April	Namibia	Gerhard Erasmus	United States	Saurabh Netravalkar	Wanderers Cricket Ground, Windhoek	United States by 2 runs
5th Match	21 April	Canada	Davy Jacobs	Oman	Zeeshan Maqsood	Wanderers Affies Park, Windhoek	Oman by 99 runs
6th Match	21 April	Papua New Guinea	Assad Vala	Hong Kong	Anshuman Rath	United Ground, Windhoek	Papua New Guinea by 3 wickets
7th Match	23 April	Hong Kong	Anshuman Rath	Oman	Zeeshan Maqsood	Wanderers Cricket Ground, Windhoek	Oman by 7 wickets
8th Match	23 April	Papua New Guinea	Assad Vala	United States	Saurabh Netravalkar	Wanderers Affies Park, Windhoek	United States by 10 wickets
9th Match	23 April	Namibia	Gerhard Erasmus	Canada	Davy Jacobs	United Ground, Windhoek	Namibia by 98 runs
10th Match	24 April	Papua New Guinea	Assad Vala	Canada	Davy Jacobs	Wanderers Cricket Ground, Windhoek	Canada by 3 wickets
11th Match	24 April	Namibia	Gerhard Erasmus	Oman	Zeeshan Maqsood	Wanderers Affies Park, Windhoek	Oman by 4 wickets
12th Match	24 April	Hong Kong	Anshuman Rath	United States	Saurabh Netravalkar	United Ground, Windhoek	United States by 84 runs
13th Match	26 April	Canada	Davy Jacobs	United States	Saurabh Netravalkar	Wanderers Cricket Ground, Windhoek	Canada by 40 runs
14th Match	26 April	Namibia	Gerhard Erasmus	Hong Kong	Anshuman Rath	Wanderers Affies Park, Windhoek	Namibia by 151 runs
15th Match	26 April	Papua New Guinea	Assad Vala	Oman	Khawar Ali	United Ground, Windhoek	Papua New Guinea by 145 runs
Playoffs
5th-place	27 April	Hong Kong	Anshuman Rath	Canada	Nitish Kumar	United Ground, Windhoek	Canada by 5 wickets
3rd-place (ODI 4126)	27 April	United States	Saurabh Netravalkar	Papua New Guinea	Assad Vala	Wanderers Affies Park, Windhoek	Papua New Guinea by 5 wickets
Final (ODI 4125)	27 April	Oman	Zeeshan Maqsood	Namibia	Gerhard Erasmus	Wanderers Cricket Ground, Windhoek	Namibia by 145 runs

==== Final standings ====
Pos	Team	Status
1st	Namibia	Promoted to 2019–23 ICC Cricket World Cup League 2
2nd	Oman	Promoted to 2019–23 ICC Cricket World Cup League 2
3rd	Papua New Guinea	Promoted to 2019–23 ICC Cricket World Cup League 2
4th	United States	Promoted to 2019–23 ICC Cricket World Cup League 2
5th	Canada	Relegated to ICC Cricket World Cup Challenge League
6th	Hong Kong	Relegated to ICC Cricket World Cup Challenge League

== See also ==
- Associate international cricket in 2018–19
- International cricket in 2019
