= Nomatter Mutasa =

Zimbabwean cricketer (born 1995)

Personal information
- Full name: Nomatter Mutasa
- Born: 28 October 1995 (age 31); Kwekwe, Zimbabwe
- Batting: Right-handed
- Bowling: Right-arm medium-fast

International information
- National side: Zimbabwe
- T20I debut (cap 7): 5 January 2019 v Namibia
- Last T20I: 30 August 2021 v Thailand

Domestic team information
- Years: Team
- 2020/21–present: Rhinos

Career statistics
Competition	WT20I
Matches	11
Runs scored	5
Batting average	–
100s/50s	0/0
Top score	3*
Balls bowled	192
Wickets	14
Bowling average	12.57
5 wickets in innings	0
10 wickets in match	0
Best bowling	4/9
Catches/stumpings	2/–
- Source: Cricinfo, 21 November 2021

Nomatter Mutasa (born 28 October 1995) is a Zimbabwean cricketer. She played for the Zimbabwe women's national cricket team in the 2017 Women's Cricket World Cup Qualifier in February 2017. In the tournament, she was the highest wicket-taker for Zimbabwe, with 6 dismissals. She made her Women's Twenty20 International (WT20I) debut for Zimbabwe against Namibia women on 5 January 2019.

In November 2021, she was named in Zimbabwe's team for the 2021 Women's Cricket World Cup Qualifier tournament in Zimbabwe. She played in Zimbabwe's first match of the tournament, against Thailand, claiming a wicket for 39 runs from her 7 overs.
