= Asian Institute of Technology Ground =

Cricket ground

Coordinates: 14.07950°N 100.60942°E

- AIT Ground
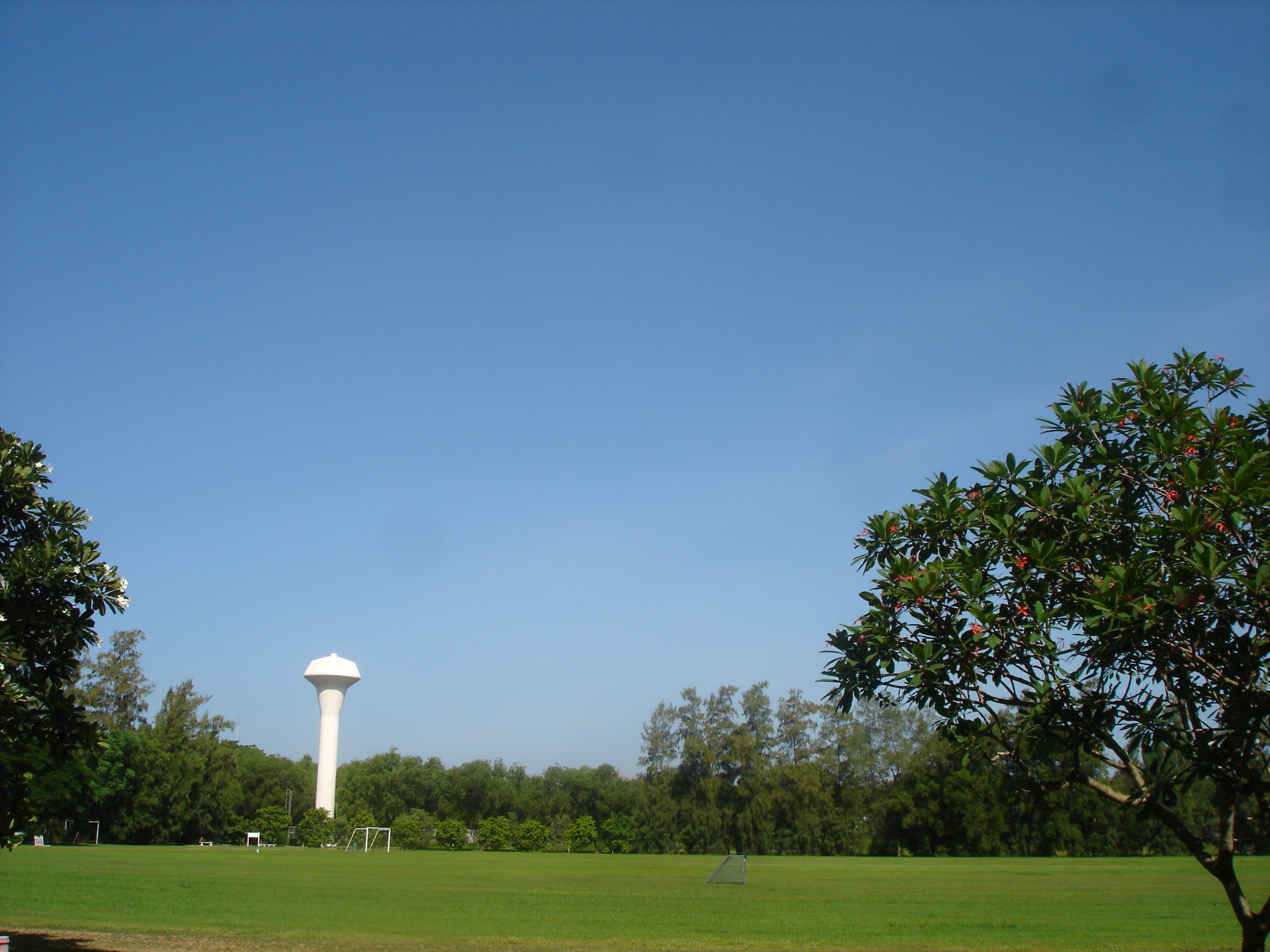
- Interactive map of Asian Institute of Technology Ground

Ground information
- Location: Khlong Luang, Pathum Thani, Thailand
- Country: Thailand
- Establishment: 2006
- Capacity: n/a
- Owner: Asian Institute of Technology
- Operator: Asian Institute of Technology
- Tenants: Thailand cricket team
- End names
- n/a

International information
- First women's T20I: 26 November 2016: Bangladesh v India
- Last women's T20I: 27 February 2019: Thailand v United Arab Emirates
- As of 30 January 2024; Source: Cricinfo

The Asian Institute of Technology Ground is a university ground in Pathum Thani, Thailand. The ground is owned by the Asian Institute of Technology (AIT). The AIT field is one of the three cricket fields in Thailand where Thailand Cricket League matches are played. The AIT Cricket Team has also won the Bangkok Cricket League 'A' Division two times during the past three years.

It also boasts of a 9-hole golf course and a swimming pool. The self-contained campus also offers facilities including badminton, takraw, table tennis, tennis, basketball, cricket, volleyball and swimming.

In 2015, the Asian Institute of Technology Ground was named one of the host venues of the Women's World Twenty20 Qualifier along with Thailand Cricket Ground.

== See also ==
- Asian Institute of Technology
- 2015 ICC Women's World Twenty20 Qualifier
- Terdthai Cricket Ground
