= Humaira Tasneem =

Emirati cricketer (born 1995)

Personal information
- Born: 8 June 1995 (age 31); Al Ain, United Arab Emirates
- Batting: Right-handed
- Bowling: Right-arm offbreak
- Role: Batter

International information
- National side: United Arab Emirates
- T20I debut (cap 5): 7 July 2018 v Netherlands
- Last T20I: 24 February 2019 v China

Career statistics
Competition	T20I
Matches	16
Runs scored	49
Batting average	4.90
100s/50s	0/0
Top score	11
Balls bowled	86
Wickets	10
Bowling average	9.20
5 wickets in innings	0
10 wickets in match	0
Best bowling	2/6
Catches/stumpings	7/–
- Source: Cricinfo, 15 January 2022

Humaira Tasneem (born 8 June 1995) is a women's cricketer who plays for the United Arab Emirates national cricket team. In July 2018, she was named as the captain of the United Arab Emirates' squad for the 2018 ICC Women's World Twenty20 Qualifier tournament. She made her Women's Twenty20 International (WT20I) debut for the United Arab Emirates against the Netherlands in the World Twenty20 Qualifier on 7 July 2018.

== Early and personal life ==
Tasneem was born in Al Ain to Indian parents from Hyderabad who had settled in Sharjah where she grew up playing basketball and cricket with her siblings. She did her schooling from DPS, Sharjah and attended the American University of Sharjah.

== International career ==
Tasneem played domestic cricket in the UAE and eventually debuted for her country at the age of 13 in 2008 on the tour to Thailand. She also led the UAE U19 team in the Asia Cricket Council (ACC) Under-19 Women's Cup held in Kuwait in 2012.

Tasneem was selected in the UAE squad for the 2018 ICC Women's World Twenty20 Qualifier tournament and played her senior debut WT20I match for the United Arab Emirates against the Netherlands on 7 July 2018. She became UAE's youngest captain at the age of 23 and also won her debut match as the captain of the national team.
