= Sparta Cricket Club Ground =

Cricket ground

- Sparta Recreational Club

Ground information
- Location: Walvis Bay, Namibia
- Country: Namibia
- Establishment: 1993/94 (first recorded match)

International information
- First WT20I: 5 January 2019: Namibia v Zimbabwe
- Last WT20I: 10 January 2019: Namibia v Zimbabwe
- As of 4 September 2020; Source: Ground profile

Sparta Cricket Club Ground, also known as the Sparta Recreational Club, is a cricket ground in Walvis Bay, Namibia. The first recorded match on the ground was in the 1993/94 cricket season. It hosted its first first-class cricket match on 15 October 2015. It was used as a venue to host matches during the 2016–17 Sunfoil 3-Day Cup.
