= List of Cameroon women Twenty20 International cricketers =

This is a list of Cameroon women Twenty20 International cricketers. A Women's Twenty20 International (WT20I) is an international cricket match between two representative teams. A WT20I is played under the rules of Twenty20 cricket. In April 2018, the International Cricket Council (ICC) granted full international status to Twenty20 women's matches played between member sides from 1 July 2018 onwards. Cameroon women played their first WT20I on 12 September 2021 against Uganda during 2021 ICC Women's T20 World Cup Africa Qualifier.

This list comprises all members of the Cameroon women's cricket team who have played at least one WT20I match. It is initially arranged in the order in which each player won her first Twenty20 cap. Where more than one player won her first Women's Twenty20 cap in the same match, their surnames have been listed alphabetically.

== Key ==
General

- ‡ – Captain
- † – Wicket-keeper
- First – Year of debut
- Last – Year of latest game
- Mat – Number of matches played

Batting

- Runs – Runs scored in career
- HS – Highest score
- Avg – Runs scored per dismissal
- * – Batsman remained not out
- 50 – Half-centuries scored
- 100 – Centuries scored

Bowling

- Balls – Balls bowled in career
- Wkt – Wickets taken in career
- BBI – Best bowling in an innings
- Ave – Average runs per wicket

Fielding

- Ca – Catches taken
- St – Stumpings affected

== List of players ==
Last updated 26 July 2025.

General					Batting				Bowling				Fielding		Ref
No.	Name	First	Last	Mat	Runs	HS	Avg	50	Balls	Wkt	BBI	Ave	Ca	St	Ref
1	Marguerite Bessala	2021	2025	31	214	32*	8.23	0	102	2	1/3	65.50	12	0	
2	Maeva Douma	2021	2025	20	25	9	1.66	0	276	13	3/8	19.23	0	0	
3	Michelle Ekani‡†	2021	2025	26	168	28	7.00	0	269	12	3/12	25.75	6	0	
4	Akago Eliane	2021	2025	7	5	3	1.25	0	54	1	1/26	77.00	0	0	
5	Nantia Kenfack†	2021	2021	4	28	23	7.00	0	–	–	–	–	0	0	
6	Tchouabo Leslie	2021	2024	21	62	14*	3.87	0	333	16	3/13	21.43	5	0	
7	Clemence Manidom	2021	2025	20	70	12	4.11	0	153	8	3/10	18.12	2	0	
8	Bernadette Mbida	2021	2025	30	246	33	8.20	0	433	13	2/17	37.61	4	0	
9	Cynerah Mboe‡	2021	2024	10	54	20	5.40	0	51	3	2/12	13.33	0	0	
10	Jeanne Ngono	2021	2025	22	129	25	7.16	0	120	5	1/7	29.75	4	0	
11	Madaleine Sissako†	2021	2025	32	370	57	11.93	2	235	9	3/14	29.77	10	1	
12	Michel Tedjui	2021	2021	2	4	3	2.00	0	–	–	–	–	0	0	
13	Edwige Guehoada	2023	2025	22	48	16*	8.00	0	385	18	4/1	18.16	4	0	
14	Elsa Kana	2023	2025	26	74	18	3.36	0	11	1	1/12	12.00	1	0	
15	Olive Ranedoumoun	2023	2025	24	81	12	4.76	0	312	16	3/16	16.56	1	0	
16	Brenda Waluma	2023	2025	27	109	14*	4.73	0	–	–	–	–	2	0	
17	Sonita Akenji	2023	2025	9	15	8*	3.00	0	125	6	2/11	23.00	0	0	
18	Catherine Messina	2024	2024	6	5	3	0.83	0	–	–	–	–	0	0	
19	Sandra Nono	2024	2024	6	8	4*	2.00	0	–	–	–	–	0	0	
20	Cathy Mbelel	2024	2025	13	39	9	4.33	0	–	–	–	–	5	0	
21	Nangeh Diom	2025	2025	5	5	4	2.50	0	–	–	–	–	0	0	
