= Cricket at the 2017 SEA Games =

- Dates: August 2017 – August 2017
- Administrator: Southeast Asian Games Federation
- Cricket format: 3 events: Twenty20 (M & W); 50 overs (M)
- Host(s): Kinrara Oval; Selangor, Malaysia
- Participants: 6

The cricket competitions at the 2017 SEA Games in Kuala Lumpur took place at Kinrara Oval in Selangor.

The 2017 Games featured cricket competitions in three events (men's twenty20 and 50-over tournaments and women's twenty20 tournament).

== Competition schedule ==
RR	Round robin	B	3rd place play-off	F	Final

Event	Thu 17	Fri 18	Sat 19	Sun 20	Mon 21	Tue 22	Wed 23	Thu 24	Fri 25	Sat 26	Sun 27	Mon 28		Tue 29	
Men's 50 over	RR	RR	RR	RR	RR	RR	RR	RR							
Men's Twenty20										RR	RR	RR		B	F
Women's Twenty20						RR	RR	RR	RR	RR	RR	B	F		

== Participants ==
Nation	Men's		Women's
Nation	T20	50 overs	T20
Indonesia	Yes	Yes	Yes
Malaysia	Yes	Yes	Yes
Myanmar	Yes	Yes	No
Singapore	Yes	Yes	Yes
Thailand	Yes	Yes	Yes
Vietnam	Yes	No	No

== Medal summary ==
=== Medal table ===
Host nation (Malaysia)

Rank	Nation	Gold	Silver	Bronze	Total
1	Malaysia*	1	1	1	3
2	Singapore	1	1	0	2
3	Thailand	1	0	1	2
4	Indonesia	0	1	1	2
Totals (4 entries)		3	3	3	9

=== Men's event ===
Event	Gold	Silver	Bronze
Twenty20 tournament	Singapore (SGP); Abhiraj Singh; Anantha Krishna; Anish Paraam; Arun Vijayan; Mulewa Dharmichand; Iishaan Shekhar; Janak Prakash; Mohamed Shoib; Navin Param; Pramodh Raja; Prasheen Param; Rezza Gaznavi; Riaz Altaff Hussein; Varun Sivaram; Vivek Vedagiri	Malaysia (MAS); Ahmed Faiz; Aminudin Ramly; Derek Duraisingam; Dhivendran Mogan; Anwar Arudin; Shafiq Sharif; Shukri Rahim; Suharril Fetri; Muhamad Syahadat; Anwar Rahman; Fitri Sham; Muhammad Wafiq; Sivanantha Krishnan; Syed Aziz; Virandeep Singh	Indonesia (INA); Aditya Gustama; Ahmad Ramdoni; Cristian Koda; Frengky Shony; Gede Arta; Putra Kisawa; Gede Arsa; Kadek Dharmawan; Kadek Gamantika; Ketut Pastika; Wayan Budiarta; Muhaddis; Anjar Tadarus; Maxi Koda
50 over tournament	Malaysia (MAS); Abdul Rashid Ahad; Ahmed Faiz; Derek Duraisingam; Dhivendran Mogan; Fikri Makram; Mohamad Norwira Zazmie Halim; Anwar Arudin; Shafiq Sharif; Shukri Rahim; Suharril Fetri; Muhamad Syahadat; Anwar Rahman; Muhammad Wafiq; Pavandeep Singh; Virandeep Singh	Singapore (SGP); Abhiraj Singh; Anantha Krishna; Anish Paraam; Arun Vijayan; Deepak Sarika; Mulewa Dharmichand; James Muruthi; Janak Prakash; Karthik Suresh; Mohamed Shoib; Navin Param; Prasheen Param; Rezza Gaznavi; Varun Sivaram; Vivek Vedagiri	Thailand (THA); Bunchuai Sombatraksa; Chanchai Pengkumta; Kamron Senamontree; Kiatiwut Suttisan; Kittanu Sae Kue; Nikom Ma Yer; Nopphon Senamontree; Panasak Daenmalidoi; Payuputh Sungnard; Sittipong Hongsi; Thanatit Jiraphanthawong; Thichakorn Chalasri; Vichanath Singh; Wanchana Uisuk; Werachai Maneerat

=== Women's event ===
Event	Gold	Silver	Bronze
Twenty20 tournament	Thailand (THA); Chanida Sutthiruang; Nannapat Koncharoenkai; Naruemol Chaiwai; Nattaya Boochatham; Natthakan Chantam; Onnicha Kamchomphu; Ratanaporn Padunglerd; Rattana Sangsoma; Rosenanee Kanoh; Sainammin Saenya; Sirintra Saengsakaorat; Soraya Lateh; Sornnarin Tippoch; Suleeporn Laomi; Wongpaka Liengprasert	Indonesia (INA); Andriani; Annisa Sulistianingsih; Berlian Pare; Netty Sitompul; Ni Rada Rani; Ni Suwandewi; Ni Sakarini; Ni Sariani; Puji Haryanti; Putu Sri Apridayanti; Tantri Wigradianti; Tazkia Hanum; Vegy Januarika; Yulia Anggraeni	Malaysia (MAS); Ainna Hamizah Hashim; Nur Arianna Natasya; Christina Baret; Dewi Chunam; Emylia Eliani; Jamahidaya Intan; Jannadiah Halim; Mahirah Izzati Ismail; Mas Elysa; Noor Hayati Zakaria; Nur Nadihirah; Sasha Azmi; Winifred Duraisingam; Yusrina Yaakop; Zumika Azmi
