= 2018 ASEAN Women's T20 Open Tournament =

2018 ASEAN Women's T20
- Dates: 6 – 13 March 2018
- Cricket format: Twenty20
- Tournament format(s): Round-robin
- Host(s): Thailand
- Champions: Thailand
- Runners-up: Tanzania
- Participants: 6
- Matches: 15
- Most runs: (Thailand) Nattaya Boochatham (151)
- Most wickets: (Indonesia) Andriani (11)

The 2018 ASEAN Women's T20 Open Tournament was a women's Twenty20 (T20) cricket tournament held in Thailand from 6 to 13 March 2018. The six participating teams were the women's national sides of Bhutan, Hong Kong, Indonesia, Malaysia, Tanzania and hosts Thailand. The matches were all played at the Terdthai Cricket Ground in Bangkok. Matches did not have Twenty20 International status, as the tournament was played a few months before the International Cricket Council's decision to grant full Twenty20 International status to all its members came into effect from 1 July 2018 for women's teams.

The hosts won the round-robin tournament with a perfect record of five wins from five matches, while Tanzania finished as runners-up.

== Squads ==
Bhutan	Hong Kong	Indonesia	Malaysia	Tanzania	Thailand
Dechen Wangmo (c); Ritshi Choden; Sonam Choden; Yshey Choden; Karma Dema; Leki Dema; Ugyen Dema; Devika Drjee; Anju Gurung; Nima Lhamo; Sonam Paldon; Yeshey Wangmo; Tshering Yangchen; Tshering Zangmo	Mariko Hill (c); Anum Ahmad; Maryam Bibi; Kary Chan; Lemon Cheung; Tammy Chu; Yasmin Daswani; Rajvir Kaur; Emma Lai; Venezia Ogden; Bella Poon; Shanzeen Shahzad; Mei Wai Siu; Oi Wing Tammy; Ruchita Venkatesh; Akasha Yousaf; Mehreen Yousaf	Puji Haryanti (c); Andriani; Yulia Anggraeni; Berlin Duma Pare; Edenyce Eduard; Kadek Fitri; Vegy Januarika; Ni Sakarini; Ni Sariani; Netty Sitompul; Annisa Sulistianingsih; Ni Suwandewi; Fajar Tri Indah; Tantri Wigradianti	Winifred Duraisingam (c); Christina Baret; Emylia Eliani; Mas Elysa; Nur Syazwina Hanim; Ainna Hamizah Hashim; Jamahidaya Intan; Mahirah Izzati Ismail; Wan Julia; Nur Nadihirah; Aina Najwa; Zayani Syamimi; Yusrina Yaakop	Monica Pascal (c); Mwaneidi Ammy; Zena Hassani; Zinaida Jeremiah; Perice Kamunya; Fatuma Kibasu; Linda Massawe; Aisha Mohamed; Shufaa Mohamedi; Hudaa Omary; Tabu Omary; Neema Pius; Nasra Saidi	Sornnarin Tippoch (c); Nattaya Boochatham; Naruemol Chaiwai; Natthakan Chantham; Rosenan Kanoh; Nannapat Koncharoenkai; Suleeporn Laomi; Wongpaka Liengprasert; Ratanaporn Padunglerd; Sirintra Saengsakaorat; Sainammin Saenya; Chanida Sutthiruang; Arriya Yenyueak

== Points table ==
Team	P	W	L	T	NR	Pts	NRR
Thailand (H)	5	5	0	0	0	10	+4.952
Tanzania	5	4	1	0	0	8	+1.447
Indonesia	5	3	2	0	0	6	–1.421
Bhutan	5	1	3	0	1	3	–2.033
Hong Kong	5	1	4	0	0	2	–1.131
Malaysia	5	0	4	0	1	1	–1.971

== Matches ==
6 March 2018
Scorecard

Thailand; 156/4 (20 overs)	v	Malaysia; 48 (20 overs)
Nattaya Boochatham 68* (51); Nur Nadihirah 2/24 (4 overs)		Yusrina Yaakop 11 (24); Chanida Sutthiruang 2/6 (2 overs)

Thailand Women won by 108 runs
Terdthai Cricket Ground, Bangkok
Umpires: Arif Ansari (Tha) and Mohammed Kamruzzaman (Tha)

- Malaysia Women won the toss and elected to field.

6 March 2018
Scorecard

Bhutan; 88 (20 overs)	v	Hong Kong; 79/9 (20 overs)
Dechen Wangmo 18 (16); Mariko Hill 3/7 (4 overs)		Kary Chan 15 (20); Tshering Zhangmo 2/16 (4 overs)

Bhutan Women won by 9 runs
Terdthai Cricket Ground, Bangkok
Umpires: Arif Ansari (Tha) and Mohammed Kamruzzaman (Tha)

- Bhutan Women won the toss and elected to bat.

7 March 2018
Scorecard

Hong Kong; 67/9 (20 overs)	v	Indonesia; 70/8 (14.3 overs)
Yasmin Daswani 28 (57); Andriani 4/5 (4 overs)		Andriani 24 (23); Mariko Hill 4/14 (4 overs)

Indonesia Women won by 2 wickets
Terdthai Cricket Ground, Bangkok
Umpires: Arif Ansari (Tha) and Mohammed Kamruzzaman (Tha)

- Indonesia Women won the toss and elected to field.

7 March 2018
Scorecard

Tanzania; 58 (17.3 overs)	v	Thailand; 61/3 (14.5 overs)
Monica Pascal 31 (48); Wongpaka Liengprasert 3/7 (2.3 overs)		Sornnarin Tippoch 23* (18); Zinaida Jeremiah 2/10 (4 overs)

Thailand Women won by 7 wickets
Terdthai Cricket Ground, Bangkok
Umpires: Arif Ansari (Tha) and Mohammed Kamruzzaman (Tha)

- Tanzania Women won the toss and elected to bat.

8 March 2018
Scorecard

Tanzania; 100/4 (20 overs)	v	Malaysia; 56 (18.3 overs)
Monica Pascal 46* (60); Nur Nadihirah 1/10 (4 overs)		Yusrina Yaakop 10 (25); Mwanaidi Ammy 3/3 (2.3 overs)

Tanzania Women won by 44 runs
Terdthai Cricket Ground, Bangkok
Umpires: Arif Ansari (Tha) and Mohammed Kamruzzaman (Tha)

- Tanzania Women won the toss and elected to bat.

8 March 2018
Scorecard

Bhutan; 48 (17.4 overs)	v	Indonesia; 49/6 (10 overs)
Yshey Choden 15 (26); Andriani 3/10 (3.4 overs)		Ni Sariani 11* (7); Anju Gurung 4/17 (4 overs)

Indonesia Women won by 4 wickets
Terdthai Cricket Ground, Bangkok
Umpires: Arif Ansari (Tha) and Mohammed Kamruzzaman (Tha)

- Bhutan Women won the toss and elected to bat.

9 March 2018
Scorecard

Bhutan	v	Malaysia

Match abandoned
Terdthai Cricket Ground, Bangkok
Umpires: Arif Ansari (Tha) and Mohammed Kamruzzaman (Tha)

- No toss.
- No play was possible due to rain.

9 March 2018
Scorecard

Thailand; 85/4 (12 overs)	v	Hong Kong; 47/7 (12 overs)
Nattaya Boochatham 25 (28); Mariko Hill 2/15 (3 overs)		Kary Chan 21 (22); Wongpaka Liengprasert 2/4 (2 overs)

Thailand Women won by 38 runs
Terdthai Cricket Ground, Bangkok
Umpires: Arif Ansari (Tha) and Mohammed Kamruzzaman (Tha)

- Hong Kong Women won the toss and elected to field.
- The match was reduced to 12 overs per side due to rain.

10 March 2018
Scorecard

Hong Kong; 119/2 (20 overs)	v	Malaysia; 119/3 (20 overs)
Yasmin Daswani 56* (57); Ainna Hamizah Hashim 1/22 (4 overs); Nur Syazwina Hanim 1/22 (4 overs)		Christina Baret 44* (63); Mei Wai Siu 1/18 (3 overs)

Match tied (Hong Kong Women won the Super Over)
Terdthai Cricket Ground, Bangkok
Umpires: Tauseef Khalid (Tha) and Sanjay Sarda (Tha)

- Hong Kong Women won the toss and elected to bat.

10 March 2018
Scorecard

Indonesia; 26 (13.5 overs)	v	Tanzania; 27/3 (8.1 overs)
Ni Sariani 6 (20); Zena Hassani 4/7 (4 overs)		Mwanaidi Ammy 12* (23); Ni Sariani 2/6 (4 overs)

Tanzania Women won by 7 wickets
Terdthai Cricket Ground, Bangkok
Umpires: Arif Ansari (Tha) and Mohammed Kamruzzaman (Tha)

- Indonesia Women won the toss and elected to bat.

11 March 2018
Scorecard

Tanzania; 92/6 (20 overs)	v	Bhutan; 50 (19.4 overs)
Mwanaidi Ammy 30* (24); Devika Drjee 3/12 (3 overs)		Dechen Wangmo 21 (28); Mwanaidi Ammy 2/14 (4 overs)

Tanzania Women won by 42 runs
Terdthai Cricket Ground, Bangkok
Umpires: Mohammed Kamruzzaman (Tha) and Ashwani Kumar Rana (Tha)

- Tanzania Women won the toss and elected to bat.

11 March 2018
Scorecard

Thailand; 167/2 (20 overs)	v	Indonesia; 25 (16 overs)
Natthakan Chantam 76* (61); Andriani 2/31 (4 overs)		Ni Suwandewi 10 (35); Wongpaka Liengprasert 3/5 (3 overs)

Thailand Women won by 142 runs
Terdthai Cricket Ground, Bangkok
Umpires: Arif Ansari (Tha) and Ashwani Kumar Rana (Tha)

- Indonesia Women won the toss and elected to field.

12 March 2018
Scorecard

Bhutan; 16 (13.4 overs)	v	Thailand; 17/2 (2 overs)
Sonam Choden 4 (17); Ratanaporn Padunglerd 3/1 (4 overs)		Nattaya Boochatham 12* (8); Anju Gurung 2/4 (1 over)

Thailand Women won by 8 wickets
Terdthai Cricket Ground, Bangkok
Umpires: Mohammed Kamruzzaman (Tha) and Tauseef Khalid (Tha)

- Bhutan Women won the toss and elected to bat.

13 March 2018
Scorecard

Tanzania; 110/3 (20 overs)	v	Hong Kong; 86/7 (20 overs)
Monica Pascal 45* (56); Oi Wing Tammy 1/9 (1 over)		Kary Chan 32* (26); Monica Pascal 3/13 (4 overs)

Tanzania Women won by 24 runs
Terdthai Cricket Ground, Bangkok
Umpires: Mohammed Kamruzzaman (Tha) and Tauseef Khalid (Tha)

- Hong Kong Women won the toss and elected to field.

13 March 2018
Scorecard

Malaysia; 65/7 (20 overs)	v	Indonesia; 66/9 (19.1 overs)
Winifred Duraisingam 21 (54); Ni Sariani 1/7 (4 overs)		Annisa Sulistianingsih 15* (21); Nur Nadihirah 3/9 (4 overs)

Indonesia Women won by 1 wicket
Terdthai Cricket Ground, Bangkok
Umpires: Arif Ansari (Tha) and Mohammed Kamruzzaman (Tha)

- Indonesia Women won the toss and elected to field.
