= Cricket at the 2025 SEA Games =

- Venues: Terdthai Cricket Ground, Bangkok; Asian Institute of Technology Ground, Bangkok
- Dates: 9–19 December 2025
- Teams: 5 (Men's); 6 (Women's)

Medalists
gold medal	M: T20: Malaysia; T10: Malaysia; W: T20: Thailand; T10: Thailand
silver medal	M: T20: Philippines; T10: Philippines; W: T20: Malaysia; T10: Indonesia
bronze medal	M: T20: Singapore; T10: Singapore; W: T20: Indonesia; T10: Malaysia

Cricket competitions at the 2025 SEA Games will be held at Terdthai Cricket Ground and Asian Institute of Technology Ground in Bangkok, Thailand from 9 to 19 December 2025. Cricket was officially included as a sport in December 2024 after backing from the Asian Cricket Council. Two formats of cricket will be contested: T10 and T20.

During the announcement of inclusion, Mahinda Vallipuram, the Asian Cricket Council Chairman of Development, described it as "another significant step forward for the sport in Southeast Asia".

To prepare for the games, the men's teams of Malaysia and Thailand (as well as Bahrain) will contest a "Mini SEA Games" tournament in both T10 and T20 formats, in November 2025 in Malaysia.

== Competition schedule ==
RR/G	Round robin/Group stage	SF	Semi-finals	B	Bronze medal match	F	Gold medal match

Event	Tue 9	Wed 10	Thu 11	Fri 12		Sat 13		Sun 14	Mon 15	Tue 16	Wed 17		Thu 18	Fri 19	
Men's T20	RR	RR	RR	RR		RR	F								
Men's T10									RR	RR	RR	F			
Women's T10	RR	RR	SF	B	F										
Women's T20									RR	RR	RR		SF	B	F

== Participants ==
Nation	Men		Women	
Nation	T10	T20	T10	T20
Indonesia	Yes	Yes	Yes	Yes
Malaysia	Yes	Yes	Yes	Yes
Myanmar	No	No	Yes	Yes
Philippines	Yes	Yes	Yes	Yes
Singapore	Yes	Yes	Yes	Yes
Thailand	Yes	Yes	Yes	Yes

== Medalists ==
Event	Gold	Silver	Bronze
Men's T10	Malaysia; Muhammad Haziq Aiman; Ainool Hafizs; Syed Aziz; Muhammad Amir; Azri Azhar; Ahmad Faiz; Amir Khan; Aslam Khan; Sharvin Muniandy; Pavandeep Singh; Virandeep Singh; Muhamad Syahadat; Vijay Unni; Muhammad Wafiq; Zubaidi Zulkifle	Philippines; Rhys Burinaga; Mark Doal; Josef Doctora; Andrew Donovan; Kshitij Khurana; Kepler Lukies; Mark Manalo; Miggy Podosky; Grant Russ; Amanpreet Sirah; Daniel Smith; Christopher Stamp; Nivek Tanner; Jonathon Tuffin; Henry Tyler; Francis Walsh	Singapore; Mahiyu Bhatia; Aman Desai; Rezza Gaznavi; Atharva Gune; Girin Gune; Aslan Jafri; Neil Karnik; Vedant Nagpaul; Kannusami Sathish; Ishaan Sawney; Raoul Sharma; Chirag Shivakumar; Pranav Sudarshan; Daksh Tyagi; Sai Venugopal
Men's T20	Malaysia; Muhammad Haziq Aiman; Ainool Hafizs; Syed Aziz; Muhammad Amir; Azri Azhar; Ahmad Faiz; Amir Khan; Aslam Khan; Sharvin Muniandy; Pavandeep Singh; Virandeep Singh; Muhamad Syahadat; Vijay Unni; Muhammad Wafiq; Zubaidi Zulkifle	Philippines; Rhys Burinaga; Mark Doal; Josef Doctora; Andrew Donovan; Kshitij Khurana; Kepler Lukies; Mark Manalo; Miggy Podosky; Grant Russ; Amanpreet Sirah; Daniel Smith; Christopher Stamp; Nivek Tanner; Jonathon Tuffin; Henry Tyler; Francis Walsh	Singapore; Mahiyu Bhatia; Aman Desai; Rezza Gaznavi; Atharva Gune; Girin Gune; Aslan Jafri; Neil Karnik; Vedant Nagpaul; Kannusami Sathish; Ishaan Sawney; Raoul Sharma; Chirag Shivakumar; Pranav Sudarshan; Daksh Tyagi; Sai Venugopal
Women's T10	Thailand; Nattaya Boochatham; Nannaphat Chaihan; Naruemol Chaiwai; Natthakan Chantham; Sunida Chaturongrattana; Onnicha Kamchomphu; Rosenanee Kanoh; Nannapat Koncharoenkai; Suleeporn Laomi; Phannita Maya; Chayanisa Phengpaen; Thipatcha Putthawong; Onauma Senanok; Aphisara Suwanchonrathi; Chanida Sutthiruang	Indonesia; Fatimah Albanjari; Ni Ariani; Maria Corazon; Ni Luh Dewi; Kisi Kasse; Sang Maypriani; Rahmawati Pangestuti; Dara Paramitha; Ni Putu Ayu Nanda Sakarini; Lie Qiao; Ni Kadek Fitria Rada Rani; Ni Wayan Sariani; Emily Sirs; Ni Made Putri Suwandewi; Desi Wulandari	Malaysia; Ainur Amelina; Nur Arianna Natsya; Irdina Beh Nabil; Nur Dania Syuhada; Winifred Duraisingam; Aisya Eleesa; Mas Elysa; Ainna Hamizah Hashim; Nazatul Hidayah Husna Binti Razali; Elsa Hunter; Mahirah Izzati Ismail; Nur Izzatul Syafiqa; Wan Julia; Suabika Manivannan; Dhanusri Muhunan; Aina Najwa; Musfirah Nur Ainaa; Amalin Sorfina
Women's T20	Thailand; Nattaya Boochatham; Nannaphat Chaihan; Naruemol Chaiwai; Natthakan Chantham; Sunida Chaturongrattana; Onnicha Kamchomphu; Rosenanee Kanoh; Nannapat Koncharoenkai; Suleeporn Laomi; Phannita Maya; Chayanisa Phengpaen; Thipatcha Putthawong; Onauma Senanok; Aphisara Suwanchonrathi; Chanida Sutthiruang	Indonesia; Fatimah Albanjari; Ni Ariani; Maria Corazon; Ni Luh Dewi; Kisi Kasse; Sang Maypriani; Rahmawati Pangestuti; Dara Paramitha; Ni Putu Ayu Nanda Sakarini; Lie Qiao; Ni Kadek Fitria Rada Rani; Ni Wayan Sariani; Emily Sirs; Ni Made Putri Suwandewi; Desi Wulandari	

== Medal table ==
* Host nation (Thailand)

Rank	Nation	Gold	Silver	Bronze	Total
1	Malaysia	2	1	1	4
2	Thailand*	2	0	0	2
3	Philippines	0	2	0	2
4	Indonesia	0	1	1	2
5	Singapore	0	0	2	2
Totals (5 entries)		4	4	4	12
