= Cricket at the 2023 SEA Games =

- Dates: 29 April – 16 May 2023
- Administrator: Southeast Asian Games Federation
- Cricket format: 8 events: 50 overs (M & W); T20 (M & W); T10 (M & W); Six-a-side (M & W)
- Host(s): AZ Group Cricket Oval, Phnom Penh, Cambodia
- Participants: 7

Cricket competitions at the 2023 SEA Games were held at AZ Group Cricket Oval in Phnom Penh, Cambodia from 29 April to 16 May 2023. Despite cricket in Cambodia being relatively unknown, the sport was included in the games following lobbying from the Cricket Federation of Cambodia and the Asian Cricket Council.

Four different formats of cricket were contested: 50 overs, 20 overs, 10 overs, and six-a-side. National teams were eligible to compete in up to three of the four formats (except for hosts Cambodia who entered all formats). Matches played in the T20 tournaments had full men's Twenty20 International or women's Twenty20 International status with ranking points on offer.

During the games, the Malaysia Cricket Association complained about the organisation of the events, particularly the unseeded group stages and the lack of semi-finals, and questioned the eligibility of 13 members of Cambodia's men's squad.

== Participants ==
Nation	Men's				Women's			
Nation	6s	T10	T20	50 overs	6s	T10	T20	50 overs
Cambodia	Yes	Yes	Yes	Yes	Yes	Yes	Yes	Yes
Indonesia	Yes	No	Yes	Yes	Yes	No	Yes	Yes
Malaysia	No	Yes	Yes	Yes	No	Yes	Yes	Yes
Myanmar	No	No	No	No	Yes	No	Yes	Yes
Philippines	Yes	Yes	Yes	No	Yes	Yes	Yes	No
Singapore	Yes	Yes	Yes	No	Yes	Yes	Yes	No
Thailand	No	Yes	Yes	Yes	No	Yes	Yes	Yes

The Vietnam national cricket team withdrew after failing to secure government funding for its participation.

== Medalists ==
Event	Gold	Silver	Bronze
Men's 6s	Singapore; Aahan Gopinath Achar; Abdul Rahman Bhadelia; Adwitya Bhargava; Mahiyu Bhatia; Aman Desai; Avi Dixit; Rezza Gaznavi; Anantha Krishna; Amjad Mahboob; Anish Paraam; Navin Param; Utsav Rakshit; Rohan Rangarajan; Raoul Sharma; Venkatesan Thiyanesh	Cambodia; Etienne Beukes; Phon Bunthean; Luqman Butt; Sahaj Chadha; Gulam Chughtai; Sharwan Godara; Lakshit Gupta; Uday Hathinjar; Utkarsh Jain; Anish Prasad; Chanthoeun Rathanak; Te Senglong; Ram Sharan; Salvin Stanly; Pel Vannak	Indonesia; Kadek Gamantika; Muhammad Afis; Gede Arta; Ketut Artawan; Ferdinando Banunaek; Kadek Darmawan; Danilson Hawoe; Maxi Koda; Muhaddis; Ketut Pastika; Gede Prastama; Gema Pramanda; Gede Priandana; Ahmad Ramdoni; Anjar Tadarus
Men's T10	Cambodia; Etienne Beukes; Phon Bunthean; Luqman Butt; Sahaj Chadha; Gulam Chughtai; Sharwan Godara; Lakshit Gupta; Uday Hathinjar; Utkarsh Jain; Anish Prasad; Chanthoeun Rathanak; Te Senglong; Ram Sharan; Salvin Stanly; Pel Vannak	Malaysia; Muhammad Amir; Wan Azam; Syed Aziz; Ahmad Faiz; Syazrul Idrus; Aslam Khan; Sharvin Muniandy; Nazril Rahman; Fitri Sham; Pavandeep Singh; Virandeep Singh; Muhamad Syahadat; Vijay Unni; Muhammad Wafiq; Zubaidi Zulkifle	Singapore; Aahan Gopinath Achar; Abdul Rahman Bhadelia; Adwitya Bhargava; Mahiyu Bhatia; Aman Desai; Avi Dixit; Rezza Gaznavi; Anantha Krishna; Amjad Mahboob; Anish Paraam; Navin Param; Utsav Rakshit; Rohan Rangarajan; Raoul Sharma; Venkatesan Thiyanesh
Men's T20	Cambodia; Etienne Beukes; Phon Bunthean; Luqman Butt; Sahaj Chadha; Gulam Chughtai; Sharwan Godara; Lakshit Gupta; Uday Hathinjar; Utkarsh Jain; Anish Prasad; Chanthoeun Rathanak; Te Senglong; Ram Sharan; Salvin Stanly; Pel Vannak	Malaysia; Muhammad Amir; Wan Azam; Syed Aziz; Ahmad Faiz; Syazrul Idrus; Aslam Khan; Sharvin Muniandy; Nazril Rahman; Fitri Sham; Pavandeep Singh; Virandeep Singh; Muhamad Syahadat; Vijay Unni; Muhammad Wafiq; Zubaidi Zulkifle	Singapore; Aahan Gopinath Achar; Abdul Rahman Bhadelia; Adwitya Bhargava; Mahiyu Bhatia; Aman Desai; Avi Dixit; Rezza Gaznavi; Anantha Krishna; Amjad Mahboob; Anish Paraam; Navin Param; Utsav Rakshit; Rohan Rangarajan; Raoul Sharma; Venkatesan Thiyanesh
Men's 50 overs	Cambodia; Etienne Beukes; Phon Bunthean; Luqman Butt; Sahaj Chadha; Gulam Chughtai; Sharwan Godara; Lakshit Gupta; Uday Hathinjar; Utkarsh Jain; Anish Prasad; Chanthoeun Rathanak; Te Senglong; Ram Sharan; Salvin Stanly; Pel Vannak	Malaysia; Muhammad Amir; Wan Azam; Syed Aziz; Ahmad Faiz; Syazrul Idrus; Aslam Khan; Sharvin Muniandy; Nazril Rahman; Fitri Sham; Pavandeep Singh; Virandeep Singh; Muhamad Syahadat; Vijay Unni; Muhammad Wafiq; Zubaidi Zulkifle	Thailand; Chaloemwong Chatphaisan; Sorawat Desungnoen; Sittipong Hongsi; Chiraphong Liangwichian; Khanitson Namchaikul; Narawit Nuntarach; Chanchai Pengkumta; Satarut Rungrueang; Yodsak Saranonnakkun; Nopphon Senamontree; Kamron Senamontree; Vichanath Singh; Phiriyapong Suanchuai; Kiatiwut Suttisan; Sirawit Takanta
Women's 6s	Indonesia; Andriani; Yulia Anggraeni; Mia Arda Leta; Ni Kadek Ariani; Maria Corazon Konjep Wombaki; Ni Luh Ketut Wesika Ratna Dewi; Sang Ayu Nyoman Maypriani; Rahmawati Dwi Pangestuti; Berlian Duma Pare; Lie Qiao; Ni Wayan Sariani; Ni Kadek Fitria Rada Rani; Ni Putu Ayu Nanda Sakarini; Laili Salsabila; Ni Made Putri Suwandewi	Philippines; Jennifer Alumbro; Jhon Andreano; Josie Arimas; Shanilyn Asis; Catherine Bagaoisan; Jona Eguid; Joelle Galapin; Mar Mandia; Johannah McCall; Lolita Olagiure; Romela Osabel; Riza Penalba; April Saquilon; Simran Sirah; Alex Smith	Myanmar; Htet Aung; Thae Thae Aung; Lin Htun; Zin Kyaw; Zon Lin; Aye Moe; Khin Myat; Wa Thone Nadi; Htwe Neaung; Pan Ei Phyu; Thae Thae Po; May San; Theint Soe; Zar Thoon; Zar Win
Women's T10	Thailand; Nattaya Boochatham; Nanthita Boonsukham; Naruemol Chaiwai; Natthakan Chantam; Sunida Chaturongrattana; Onnicha Kamchomphu; Rosenanee Kanoh; Nannapat Koncharoenkai; Suleeporn Laomi; Banthida Leephatthana; Phannita Maya; Thipatcha Putthawong; Chanida Sutthiruang; Aphisara Suwanchonrathi; Sornnarin Tippoch	Philippines; Jennifer Alumbro; Jhon Andreano; Josie Arimas; Shanilyn Asis; Catherine Bagaoisan; Jona Eguid; Joelle Galapin; Mar Mandia; Johannah McCall; Lolita Olagiure; Romela Osabel; Riza Penalba; April Saquilon; Simran Sirah; Alex Smith	Malaysia; Nik Nur Atiela; Christina Baret; Winifred Duraisingam; Aisya Eleesa; Mas Elysa; Ainna Hamizah Hashim; Elsa Hunter; Jamahidaya Intan; Mahirah Izzati Ismail; Wan Julia; Dhanusri Muhunan; Aina Najwa; Nur Arianna Natsya; Nur Dania Syuhada; Yusrina Yaakop
Women's T20	Thailand; Nattaya Boochatham; Nanthita Boonsukham; Naruemol Chaiwai; Natthakan Chantam; Sunida Chaturongrattana; Onnicha Kamchomphu; Rosenanee Kanoh; Nannapat Koncharoenkai; Suleeporn Laomi; Banthida Leephatthana; Phannita Maya; Thipatcha Putthawong; Chanida Sutthiruang; Aphisara Suwanchonrathi; Sornnarin Tippoch	Indonesia; Andriani; Yulia Anggraeni; Mia Arda Leta; Ni Kadek Ariani; Maria Corazon Konjep Wombaki; Ni Luh Ketut Wesika Ratna Dewi; Sang Ayu Nyoman Maypriani; Rahmawati Dwi Pangestuti; Berlian Duma Pare; Lie Qiao; Ni Wayan Sariani; Ni Kadek Fitria Rada Rani; Ni Putu Ayu Nanda Sakarini; Laili Salsabila; Ni Made Putri Suwandewi	Malaysia; Nik Nur Atiela; Christina Baret; Winifred Duraisingam; Aisya Eleesa; Mas Elysa; Ainna Hamizah Hashim; Elsa Hunter; Jamahidaya Intan; Mahirah Izzati Ismail; Wan Julia; Dhanusri Muhunan; Aina Najwa; Nur Arianna Natsya; Nur Dania Syuhada; Yusrina Yaakop
Women's 50 overs	Thailand; Nattaya Boochatham; Nanthita Boonsukham; Naruemol Chaiwai; Natthakan Chantam; Sunida Chaturongrattana; Onnicha Kamchomphu; Rosenanee Kanoh; Nannapat Koncharoenkai; Suleeporn Laomi; Banthida Leephatthana; Phannita Maya; Thipatcha Putthawong; Chanida Sutthiruang; Aphisara Suwanchonrathi; Sornnarin Tippoch	Indonesia; Andriani; Yulia Anggraeni; Mia Arda Leta; Ni Kadek Ariani; Maria Corazon Konjep Wombaki; Ni Luh Ketut Wesika Ratna Dewi; Sang Ayu Nyoman Maypriani; Rahmawati Dwi Pangestuti; Berlian Duma Pare; Lie Qiao; Ni Wayan Sariani; Ni Kadek Fitria Rada Rani; Ni Putu Ayu Nanda Sakarini; Laili Salsabila; Ni Made Putri Suwandewi	Malaysia; Nik Nur Atiela; Christina Baret; Winifred Duraisingam; Aisya Eleesa; Mas Elysa; Ainna Hamizah Hashim; Elsa Hunter; Jamahidaya Intan; Mahirah Izzati Ismail; Wan Julia; Dhanusri Muhunan; Aina Najwa; Nur Arianna Natsya; Nur Dania Syuhada; Yusrina Yaakop

== Medal table ==
* Host nation (Cambodia)

Rank	Nation	Gold	Silver	Bronze	Total
1	Cambodia*	3	1	0	4
2	Thailand	3	0	1	4
3	Indonesia	1	2	1	4
4	Singapore	1	0	2	3
5	Malaysia	0	3	3	6
6	Philippines	0	2	0	2
7	Myanmar	0	0	1	1
Totals (7 entries)		8	8	8	24
