= Cricket at the 2026 Asian Games – Women's Qualifier =

2026 Women's Asian Games Qualifier
- Dates: 26 – 31 May 2026
- Administrator: Olympic Council of Asia
- Cricket format: Twenty20 International
- Tournament format(s): Group round-robin and knockouts
- Host: Malaysia
- Champions: Thailand
- Runners-up: Malaysia
- Participants: 6
- Matches: 10
- Player of the series: (Thailand) Natthakan Chantham
- Most runs: (Thailand) Natthakan Chantham (196)
- Most wickets: (Thailand) Onnicha Kamchomphu (8) (Nepal) Riya Sharma (8)

The 2026 Women's Asian Games Qualifier was the qualification tournament for the women's cricket event at the 2026 Asian Games. It was held from 26 to 31 May 2026 in Malaysia, with matches played at the Bayuemas Oval in Kuala Lumpur. The tournament served as the primary pathway to determine the final three teams advancing to the main event in Nagoya, Japan.

The qualification process determined the final eight-team lineup, with five spots filled automatically by the host nation Japan and the region's four ICC Full members. The final three teams were decided through this tournament, where six teams were split into two groups, with the top two from each group advancing to the semi-finals. The semi-final winners, along with the winner of a 3rd place play-off between the losing semi-finalists, qualified for the main tournament in Japan.

Thailand and Malaysia qualified for the main event by winning their respective semi-finals, after which China became the final team to qualify by defeating Nepal in the 3rd place play-off.

== Squads ==
China	Hong Kong	Indonesia
Mingyue Zhu (c); Cai Yuzhi; Chen Xinyu; Feng Qian; Gong Yuting; Hong Yali; Jiang Chuquin (wk); Jiaping Li; Lyu Yihan; Ma Ruike; Wang Huiying; Wei Haiting; Xie Wenyan; Zhao Yihan	Natasha Miles (c); Maryam Bibi (vc); Shing Chan; Kary Chan; Charlotte Chan; Amanda Cheung; Hiu Ying Cheung (wk); Emma Lai; Megan Leung; Siena Poon; Shanzeen Shahzad (wk); Alison Siu; Vanessa So; Hailey Wong	Ni Putu Ayu Nanda Sakarini (c, wk); Ni Ariani; Derni Bangi; Ni Luh Dewi; Kisi Kasse; Lie Qiao; Sang Maypriani; Rahmawati Pangestuti; Dara Paramitha; Kadek Winda Prastini (wk); Ni Putri; Ni Kadek Fitria Rada Rani; Ni Made Putri Suwandewi; Desi Wulandari
Malaysia	Nepal	Thailand
Mas Elysa (c); Mahirah Izzati Ismail (vc); Winifred Duraisingam; Aisya Eleesa; Ainna Hamizah Hashim; Elsa Hunter; Nurin Imanina; Wan Julia (wk); Dhanusri Muhunan; Irdina Beh Nabil; Aina Najwa (wk); Nur Arianna Natsya; Nur Qalysha; Nur Dania Syuhada	Indu Barma (c); Puja Mahato (vc); Rubina Chhetri; Kabita Joshi; Anu Kadayat; Seemana KC; Samjhana Khadka; Kabita Kunwar; Sony Pakhrin; Rubi Poddar (wk); Sita Rana Magar; Bindu Rawal; Riya Sharma; Manisha Upadhayay	Naruemol Chaiwai (c); Nannaphat Chaihan; Natthakan Chantham; Sunida Chaturongrattana; Onnicha Kamchomphu; Nannapat Koncharoenkai (wk); Suleeporn Laomi; Phannita Maya; Chayanisa Phengpaen; Thipatcha Putthawong; Arrikan Phuengkho; Chanida Sutthiruang; Aphisara Suwanchonrathi; Koranit Suwanchonrathi

== Preparations ==
=== Indonesia women in Malaysia ===
Indonesia women's cricket team in Malaysia in 2026
	Malaysia	Indonesia
- Dates: 15 May – 17 May 2026
Captains	Mas Elysa	Ni Putu Ayu Nanda Sakarini

Twenty20 International series
- Results: Indonesia won the 2-match series 2–0
Most runs	Mas Elysa (50)	Ni Luh Dewi (61)
Most wickets	Nur Dania Syuhada (2); Winifred Duraisingam (2); Mahirah Izzati Ismail (2)	Dara Paramitha (5)

Ahead of the tournament, Indonesia and Malaysia played a two-match T20I series at the Kolej Tuanku Ja'afar Cricket Oval, Mantin.

==== 1st T20I ====
15 May 2026
10:30
Scorecard

Malaysia; 86/8 (20 overs)	v	Indonesia; 87/3 (13.5 overs)
Mas Elysa 46 (49); Dara Paramitha 3/9 (4 overs)		Ni Sakarini 28* (20); Mahirah Izzati Ismail 2/18 (3 overs)

Indonesia won by 7 wickets
Kolej Tuanku Ja'afar Cricket Oval, Mantin
Umpires: Mohd Fhadli (Mas) and Khairul Iman (Mas)
Player of the match: Dara Paramitha (Idn)

- Indonesia won the toss and elected to field.
- Aina Umaira (Mas) made her T20I debut.

==== 2nd T20I ====
17 May 2026
10:30
Scorecard

Indonesia; 135/6 (20 overs)	v	Malaysia; 99/4 (20 overs)
Ni Luh Dewi 39 (33); Winifred Duraisingam 2/24 (4 overs)		Ainna Hamizah Hashim 38* (61); Dara Paramitha 2/19 (4 overs)

Indonesia won by 36 runs
Kolej Tuanku Ja'afar Cricket Oval, Mantin
Umpires: Mohd Fhadli (Mas) and Khairul Iman (Mas)
Player of the match: Kabita Kunwar (Nep)

- Indonesia won the toss and elected to bat.
- Derni Bangi (Idn) made her T20I debut.

=== Nepal women in Malaysia ===
Nepal women's cricket team in Malaysia in 2026
	Malaysia	Nepal
- Dates: 20 May – 22 May 2026
Captains	Mas Elysa	Indu Barma

Twenty20 International series
- Results: Nepal won the 2-match series 2–0
Most runs	Ainna Hamizah Hashim (24)	Samjhana Khadka (71)
Most wickets	Aisya Eleesa (3)	Riya Sharma (4); Puja Mahato (4)

Ahead of the tournament, Nepal and Malaysia played a two-match T20I series at the Bayuemas Oval, Pandamaran.

==== 1st T20I ====
20 May 2026
10:30
Scorecard

Malaysia; 67 (16.5 overs)	v	Nepal; 71/8 (17.3 overs)
Elsa Hunter 10 (14); Puja Mahato 3/13 (4 overs)		Samjhana Khadka 32 (39); Nur Qalysha 3/21 (4 overs)

Nepal won by 2 wickets
Bayuemas Oval, Pandamaran
Umpires: Mohd Fhadli (Mas) and Khairul Iman (Mas)
Player of the match: Puja Mahato (Nep)

- Malaysia won the toss and elected to bat.

==== 2nd T20I ====
22 May 2026
10:30
Scorecard

Malaysia; 82/9 (20 overs)	v	Nepal; 83/3 (16 overs)
Ainna Hamizah Hashim 17 (30); Rubina Chhetry 2/5 (2 overs)		Samjhana Khadka 39* (37); Aisya Eleesa 1/5 (3 overs)

Nepal won by 7 wickets
Bayuemas Oval, Pandamaran
Umpires: Mohd Fhadli (Mas) and Khairul Iman (Mas)
Player of the match: Kabita Kunwar (Nep)

- Malaysia won the toss and elected to bat.

== Group stage ==
=== Group A ===
==== Points table ====
Pos	Team	Pld	W	L	NR	Pts	NRR	Qualification
1	Thailand	2	2	0	0	4	3.771	Advanced to semi-finals
2	Malaysia (H)	2	1	1	0	2	−0.113	Advanced to semi-finals
3	Hong Kong	2	0	2	0	0	−3.075	Eliminated

Source: Cricinfo
(H) Host

==== Fixtures ====
26 May 2026
09:30
Scorecard

Thailand; 170/1 (20 overs)	v	Hong Kong; 81/7 (20 overs)
Natthakan Chantham 98* (65); Kary Chan 1/22 (4 overs)		Shanzeen Shahzad 21 (37); Sunida Chaturongrattana 2/11 (4 overs); Onnicha Kamchomphu 2/11 (4 overs)

Thailand won by 89 runs
Bayuemas Oval, Pandamaran
Umpires: Rokeya Sultana (Ban) and Saleema Imtiaz (Pak)
Player of the match: Natthakan Chantham (Tha)

- Thailand won the toss and elected to bat.
- Hailey Wong (HK) made her T20I debut.

27 May 2026
09:30
Scorecard

Malaysia; 82/7 (20 overs)	v	Thailand; 85/3 (12.3 overs)
Mas Elysa 45* (52); Phannita Maya 4/14 (4 overs)		Natthakan Chantham 38 (25); Ainna Hamizah Hashim 2/12 (3 overs)

Thailand won by 7 wickets
Bayuemas Oval, Pandamaran
Umpires: Humaira Farah (Pak) and Ankita Guha (Ind)
Player of the match: Phannita Maya (Tha)

- Malaysia won the toss and elected to bat.
- Thailand qualified for the semi-finals as a result of this match.

28 May 2026
09:30
Scorecard

Malaysia; 103/6 (20 overs)	v	Hong Kong; 69 (18.2 overs)
Winifred Duraisingam 35 (46); Emma Lai 2/18 (4 overs)		Maryam Bibi 17 (33); Ainna Hamizah Hashim 3/9 (4 overs)

Malaysia won by 34 runs
Bayuemas Oval, Pandamaran
Umpires: Afia Amin (Pak) and Saleema Imtiaz (Pak)
Player of the match: Winifred Duraisingam (Mas)

- Hong Kong won the toss and elected to field.
- Malaysia qualified for the semi-finals as a result of this match.

=== Group B ===
==== Points table ====
Pos	Team	Pld	W	L	NR	Pts	NRR	Qualification
1	Nepal	2	2	0	0	4	0.576	Advanced to semi-finals
2	China	2	1	1	0	2	−0.430	Advanced to semi-finals
3	Indonesia	2	0	2	0	0	−0.133	Eliminated

Source: Cricinfo

==== Fixtures ====
26 May 2026
14:00
Scorecard

Indonesia; 82/9 (20 overs)	v	China; 83/7 (19.5 overs)
Ni Putu Ayu Nanda Sakarini 37 (46); Ma Ruike 2/9 (4 overs)		Mingyue Zhu 32 (38); Ni Ariani 2/14 (4 overs)

China won by 3 wickets
Bayuemas Oval, Pandamaran
Umpires: Afia Amin (Pak) and Dedunu Silva (SL)
Player of the match: Mingyue Zhu (Chn)

- Indonesia won the toss and elected to bat.

27 May 2026
14:00
Scorecard

Nepal; 125/5 (20 overs)	v	China; 106/5 (20 overs)
Puja Mahato 63 (57); Ma Ruike 2/26 (4 overs)		Mingyue Zhu 30 (28); Riya Sharma 2/18 (4 overs)

Nepal won by 19 runs
Bayuemas Oval, Pandamaran
Umpires: Dedunu Silva (SL) and Rokeya Sultana (Ban)
Player of the match: Puja Mahato (Nep)

- Nepal won the toss and elected to bat.
- Seemana KC (Nep) made her T20I debut.

28 May 2026
14:00
Scorecard

Indonesia; 113/4 (20 overs)	v	Nepal; 114/6 (19.3 overs)
Ni Putu Ayu Nanda Sakarini 56* (62); Manisha Upadhayay 2/9 (4 overs)		Indu Barma 42* (43); Ni Putri Suwandewi 2/16 (3 overs)

Nepal won by 4 wickets
Bayuemas Oval, Pandamaran
Umpires: Humaira Farah (Pak) and Ankita Guha (Ind)
Player of the match: Indu Barma (Nep)

- Indonesia won the toss and elected to bat.
- Nepal and China qualified for the semi-finals as a result of this match.

== Knockout stage ==
=== Bracket ===
Semi-finals
A1	Thailand	137/3 (20 overs)
B2	China	53 (19.5 overs)
B1	Nepal	126/6 (20 overs)
A2	Malaysia	127/8 (18.4 overs)

Final
SFW2	Malaysia	54 (16.4 overs)
SFW1	Thailand	56/1 (10.4 overs)
3rd place play-off
SFL2	Nepal	50/5 (7 overs)
SFL1	China	45/5 (7 overs)

=== Semi-finals ===
Semi-final 1
30 May 2026
09:30
Scorecard

Thailand; 137/3 (20 overs)	v	China; 53 (19.5 overs)
Nannapat Koncharoenkai 46 (46); Jiaping Li 2/20 (3 overs)		Wei Haiting 9 (24); Onnicha Kamchomphu 3/4 (4 overs)

Thailand won by 84 runs
Bayuemas Oval, Pandamaran
Umpires: Ankita Guha (Ind) and Dedunu Silva (SL)
Player of the match: Onnicha Kamchomphu (Tha)

- China won the toss and elected to field.

Semi-final 2
30 May 2026
14:00
Scorecard

Nepal; 126/6 (20 overs)	v	Malaysia; 127/8 (18.4 overs)
Indu Barma 46* (41); Winifred Duraisingam 2/18 (4 overs)		Elsa Hunter 48 (24); Riya Sharma 3/20 (3 overs)

Malaysia won by 2 wickets
Bayuemas Oval, Pandamaran
Umpires: Rokeya Sultana (Ban) and Saleema Imtiaz (Pak)
Player of the match: Elsa Hunter (Mas)

- Nepal won the toss and elected to bat.

=== 3rd place play-off ===
31 May 2026
09:30
Scorecard

Nepal; 50/5 (7 overs)	v	China; 45/5 (7 overs)
Kabita Kunwar 22* (10); Ma Ruike 2/5 (2 overs)		Mingyue Zhu 18 (13); Riya Sharma 2/3 (2 overs)

China won by 5 wickets (DLS method)
Bayuemas Oval, Pandamaran
Umpires: Dedunu Silva (SL) and Rokeya Sultana (Ban)
Player of the match: Mingyue Zhu (Chn)

- China won the toss and elected to field.
- The match was reduced to 7 overs per side due to rain.
- China were set a revised target of 43 runs from 7 overs due to rain.

=== Final ===
31 May 2026
14:00
Scorecard

Malaysia; 54 (16.4 overs)	v	Thailand; 56/1 (10.4 overs)
Mahirah Izzati Ismail 18 (26); Suleeporn Laomi 4/13 (3.4 overs)		Natthakan Chantham 41* (30); Ainna Hamizah Hashim 1/9 (3 overs)

Thailand won by 9 wickets
Bayuemas Oval, Pandamaran
Umpires: Ankita Guha (Ind) and Saleema Imtiaz (Pak)
Player of the match: Suleeporn Laomi (Tha)

- Malaysia won the toss and elected to bat.

== See also ==
- Cricket at the 2026 Asian Games – Men's Qualifier
- Cricket at the 2026 Asian Games – Men's tournament
- Cricket at the 2026 Asian Games – Women's tournament
- 2026 Asian Games
