= Cricket at the 2025 SEA Games – Women's tournament =

2025 SEA Games cricket event

The women's cricket tournament at the 2025 SEA Games in Thailand took place in Bangkok across two venues from 9 to 19 December 2025. The Games featured two medal events each for men's and women's cricket — T10 and T20. Six teams participated in the events across both the formats.

== Squads ==
Indonesia	Malaysia	Myanmar	Philippines	Singapore	Thailand
Ni Putu Ayu Nanda Sakarini (c); Fatimah Albanjari (wk); Ni Ariani; Maria Corazon (wk); Ni Luh Dewi; Kisi Kasse; Sang Maypriani; Rahmawati Pangestuti; Dara Paramitha; Lie Qiao; Ni Kadek Fitria Rada Rani; Ni Wayan Sariani; Emily Sirs; Ni Made Putri Suwandewi; Desi Wulandari	Winifred Duraisingam (c); Ainur Amelina; Nur Arianna Natsya; Irdina Beh Nabil; Nur Dania Syuhada; Aisya Eleesa; Mas Elysa; Ainna Hamizah Hashim; Nazatul Hidayah Husna Binti Razali; Elsa Hunter; Mahirah Izzati Ismail; Nur Izzatul Syafiqa; Wan Julia (wk); Suabika Manivannan; Dhanusri Muhunan; Aina Najwa (wk); Musfirah Nur Ainaa; Amalin Sorfina	Theint Soe (c); Htet Aung; Thel Thel Aung; Zin Kyaw; Zon Lin; Khin Myat; Moe Ei Phyu; Pan Ei Phyu; Thae Thae Po (wk); May San; Thiri Sandar Shwe; Zar Thoon; Lin Lin Tun; Shwe Yee Win; Zar Win	Katie Donovan (c); Jhon Andreano; Angela Busa; Reyven Castillo; Jona Eguid; Karri Keen; Kyte Keen; Jomae Masaya; Jessica Medianesta (wk); Ashley Miranda; Romela Osabel; Simran Sirah; Alex Smith; Amelia Valdez; Elyza Wall; Kristine Wong	Shafina Mahesh (c); Chathurani Abeyratne; Laasya Bommareddy; Haresh Dhavina; Diviya G K; Jenissa Jain; Sara Merican; Pushpa Murali; Jocelyn Pooranakaran; Johanna Pooranakaran; Kamal Raja; Roma Raval; Ananya Sarma; Jacinta Si Ping; Roshni Seth	Naruemol Chaiwai (c, wk); Nattaya Boochatham; Nannaphat Chaihan; Natthakan Chantham; Sunida Chaturongrattana; Onnicha Kamchomphu; Rosenanee Kanoh; Nannapat Koncharoenkai (wk); Suleeporn Laomi; Phannita Maya; Chayanisa Phengpaen; Thipatcha Putthawong; Onauma Senanok; Aphisara Suwanchonrathi; Chanida Sutthiruang

== T10 event ==
2025 SEA Games – Women's T10
- Dates: 9 – 12 December 2025
- Administrator: Southeast Asian Games Federation
- Cricket format: T10
- Tournament format(s): Group round-robin and knockouts
- Host: Thailand
- Champions: Thailand (3rd title)
- Runners-up: Indonesia
- Third place: Malaysia
- Participants: 6
- Matches: 10
- Most runs: (Malaysia) Mas Elysa (95)
- Most wickets: (Thailand) Onnicha Kamchomphu (6) (Thailand) Thipatcha Putthawong (6) (Myanmar) Theint Soe (6)

=== Group stage ===
==== Group A ====
===== Points table =====
Pos	Team	Pld	W	L	NR	Pts	NRR	Qualification
1	Thailand (H)	2	2	0	0	4	8.225	Advanced to the semi-finals
2	Indonesia	2	1	1	0	2	0.950	Advanced to the semi-finals
3	Singapore	2	0	2	0	0	−6.531	

Source: CricClubs
(H) Host

===== Fixtures =====
9 December 2025
09:00
Scorecard

Singapore; 9 (6.5 overs)	v	Thailand; 12/0 (0.4 overs)
Diviya G K 3 (8); Thipatcha Putthawong 4/0 (2 overs)		Nattaya Boochatham 7* (3)

Thailand won by 10 wickets
Asian Institute of Technology Ground, Bangkok
Umpires: Loganathan Poobalan (Mas) and Hitesh Sharma (Phi)

- Thailand won the toss and elected to field.

9 December 2025
14:00
Scorecard

Indonesia; 45/7 (10 overs)	v	Thailand; 46/1 (4.4 overs)
Ni Luh Dewi 16 (15); Onnicha Kamchomphu 2/6 (2 overs)		Nattaya Boochatham 35* (19); Lie Qiao 1/15 (2 overs)

Thailand won by 9 wickets
Terdthai Cricket Ground, Bangkok
Umpires: Aye Min Than (Mya) and Senthil Kumar (Sin)

- Thailand won the toss and elected to field.

10 December 2025
11:30
Scorecard

Indonesia; 79/3 (10 overs)	v	Singapore; 31/5 (10 overs)
Emily Sirs 25* (18); Shafina Mahesh 1/23 (2 overs)		Diviya G K 13 (12); Sang Maypriani 2/1 (2 overs)

Indonesia won by 48 runs
Asian Institute of Technology Ground, Bangkok
Umpires: Loganathan Poobalan (Mas) and Denish Sevakumaran (Mas)

- Singapore won the toss and elected to field.

==== Group B ====
===== Points table =====
Pos	Team	Pld	W	L	NR	Pts	NRR	Qualification
1	Myanmar	2	2	0	0	4	2.169	Advanced to the semi-finals
2	Malaysia	2	1	1	0	2	1.194	Advanced to the semi-finals
3	Philippines	2	0	2	0	0	−3.350	

Source: CricClubs

===== Fixtures =====
9 December 2025
11:30
Scorecard

Myanmar; 99/5 (10 overs)	v	Philippines; 58/4 (10 overs)
Zar Win 34 (20); Karri Keen 2/14 (2 overs)		Jhon Andreano 20* (27); Theint Soe 2/6 (2 overs)

Myanmar won by 41 runs
Terdthai Cricket Ground, Bangkok
Umpires: Samad Akbar (Tha) and Denish Sevakumaran (Mas)

- Philippines won the toss and elected to field.

10 December 2025
09:00
Scorecard

Malaysia; 93/5 (10 overs)	v	Philippines; 67/7 (10 overs)
Mas Elysa 42* (28); Jhon Andreano 2/11 (2 overs)		Amelia Valdez 27 (20); Dhanusri Muhunan 2/9 (2 overs)

Malaysia won by 26 runs
Terdthai Cricket Ground, Bangkok
Umpires: Anwesh Bose (Idn) and Senthil Kumar (Sin)

- Philippines won the toss and elected to field.

10 December 2025
14:00
Scorecard

Malaysia; 65 (9.1 overs)	v	Myanmar; 66/6 (9.5 overs)
Mas Elysa 19 (16); Htet Aung 2/6 (1.1 overs)		Zon Lin 37* (33); Nur Dania Syuhada 3/10 (2 overs)

Myanmar won by 4 wickets
Terdthai Cricket Ground, Bangkok
Umpires: Anwesh Bose (Idn) and Hitesh Sharma (Phi)

- Myanmar won the toss and elected to field.

=== Semi-finals ===
11 December 2025
09:00
Scorecard

Thailand; 82/2 (6 overs)	v	Malaysia; 31/6 (6 overs)
Natthakan Chantham 42* (17); Winifred Duraisingam 1/7 (1 over)		Winifred Duraisingam 9 (10); Phannita Maya 2/3 (1 over)

Thailand won by 51 runs
Asian Institute of Technology Ground, Bangkok

- Malaysia won the toss and elected to field.
- The match was reduced to 6 overs per side due to rain.

11 December 2025
11:30
Scorecard

Indonesia; 61/6 (10 overs)	v	Myanmar; 44 (8.3 overs)
Ni Putu Ayu Nanda Sakarini 21 (17); Theint Soe 2/10 (2 overs)		Zar Win 12 (10); Ni Wayan Sariani 3/9 (2 overs)

Indonesia won by 17 runs
Asian Institute of Technology Ground, Bangkok

- Myanmar won the toss and elected to field.

=== Bronze medal match ===
12 December 2025
09:00
Scorecard

Malaysia; 74/5 (10 overs)	v	Myanmar; 47/6 (10 overs)
Mas Elysa 31* (26); Zar Win 2/5 (2 overs)		Lin Lin Tun 13 (11); Ainna Hamizah Hashim 3/5 (2 overs)

Malaysia won by 27 runs
Asian Institute of Technology Ground, Bangkok
Umpires: Samad Akbar (Tha) and Anwesh Bose (Idn)

- Myanmar won the toss and elected to field.

=== Gold medal match ===
12 December 2025
10:00
Scorecard

Indonesia; 40/6 (10 overs)	v	Thailand; 41/1 (5 overs)
Ni Kadek Fitria Rada Rani 9* (8); Thipatcha Putthawong 1/8 (2 overs)		Nattaya Boochatham 16 (9); Lie Qiao 1/10 (2 overs)

Thailand won by 9 wickets
Asian Institute of Technology Ground, Bangkok
Umpires: Anand Natarajan (Sin) and Denish Sevakumaran (Mas)

- Indonesia won the toss and elected to bat.

== T20 event ==
2025 SEA Games – Women's T20
- Dates: 15 – 19 December 2025
- Administrator: Southeast Asian Games Federation
- Cricket format: Twenty20 International
- Tournament format(s): Group round-robin and knockouts
- Host: Thailand
- Champions: Thailand (2nd title)
- Runners-up: Malaysia
- Third place: Indonesia
- Participants: 6
- Matches: 10
- Most runs: (Thailand) Natthakan Chantham (195)
- Most wickets: (Malaysia) Elsa Hunter (10)

=== Group stage ===
==== Group A ====
===== Points table =====
Pos	Team	Pld	W	L	NR	Pts	NRR	Qualification
1	Thailand (H)	2	2	0	0	4	10.611	Advanced to the semi-finals
2	Myanmar	2	1	1	0	2	−0.096	Advanced to the semi-finals
3	Singapore	2	0	2	0	0	−7.450	

Source: ESPNcricinfo
(H) Host

===== Fixtures =====
15 December 2025
09:00
Scorecard

Myanmar; 75/9 (20 overs)	v	Thailand; 76/1 (5.1 overs)
Thae Thae Po 22 (19); Sunida Chaturongrattana 3/12 (4 overs)		Natthakan Chantham 36* (14); Zar Win 1/12 (1 over)

Thailand won by 9 wickets
Terdthai Cricket Ground, Bangkok
Umpires: Anwesh Bose (Idn) and Hardeep Jadeja (Sin)

- Myanmar won the toss and elected to bat.

16 December 2025
13:30
Scorecard

Thailand; 259/4 (20 overs)	v	Singapore; 33 (16.4 overs)
Nattakan Chantham 148* (69); Roshni Seth 2/32 (4 overs)		Haresh Dhavina 9 (31); Phannita Maya 4/4 (4 overs)

Thailand won by 226 runs
Terdthai Cricket Ground, Bangkok
Umpires: Denish Sevakumaran (Mas) and Aye Min Than (Mya)

- Singapore won the toss and elected to field.
- Pushpa Murali (Sin) made her T20I debut.
- Nattakan Chantham became the first player for Thailand to score a century in women's T20Is.
- Sunida Chaturongrattana (Tha) took her first hat-trick in T20Is.

17 December 2025
13:30
Scorecard

Myanmar; 123/7 (20 overs)	v	Singapore; 51 (15.5 overs)
Lin Lin Tun 38 (43); Diviya G K 4/14 (4 overs)		Diviya G K 12 (20); Pan Ei Phyu 4/13 (4 overs)

Myanmar won by 72 runs
Terdthai Cricket Ground, Bangkok
Umpires: Anwesh Bose (Idn) and Ashwani Kumar Rana (Tha)

- Myanmar won the toss and elected to bat.

==== Group B ====
===== Points table =====
Pos	Team	Pld	W	L	NR	Pts	NRR	Qualification
1	Malaysia	2	2	0	0	4	2.441	Advanced to the semi-finals
2	Indonesia	2	1	1	0	2	3.050	Advanced to the semi-finals
3	Philippines	2	0	2	0	0	−6.191	

Source: ESPNcricinfo

===== Fixtures =====
15 December 2025
13:30
Scorecard

Malaysia; 128/7 (20 overs)	v	Indonesia; 110/9 (20 overs)
Winifred Duraisingam 50 (48); Ni Wayan Sariani 3/21 (4 overs)		Maria Corazon 51 (36); Elsa Hunter 5/9 (4 overs)

Malaysia won by 18 runs
Terdthai Cricket Ground, Bangkok
Umpires: Samad Akbar (Tha) and Anand Natarajan (Sin)

- Malaysia won the toss and elected to bat.
- Elsa Hunter (Mas) took her first five-wicket haul in T20Is.

16 December 2025
09:00
Scorecard

Indonesia; 196/5 (20 overs)	v	Philippines; 56/8 (20 overs)
Emily Sirs 53* (24); Reyven Castillo 3/26 (3 overs)		Karri Keen 18 (40); Ni Wayan Sariani 4/8 (4 overs)

Indonesia won by 140 runs
Asian Institute of Technology Ground, Bangkok
Umpires: Peerawat Duangtip (Tha) and Viswanadan Kalidas (Mas)

- Philippines won the toss and elected to field.
- Elyza Wall and Kristine Wong (Phi) both made their T20I debuts.

17 December 2025
09:00
Scorecard

Philippines; 62/9 (20 overs)	v	Malaysia; 63/2 (8.2 overs)
Alex Smith 15 (19); Mahirah Izzati Ismail 4/9 (4 overs)		Winifred Duraisingam 34* (27); Jhon Andreano 1/21 (4 overs)

Malaysia won by 8 wickets
Asian Institute of Technology Ground, Bangkok
Umpires: Peerawat Duangtip (Tha) and Anand Natarajan (Sin)

- Malaysia won the toss and elected to field.

=== Semi-finals ===
18 December 2025
09:00
Scorecard

Thailand; 144/8 (20 overs)	v	Indonesia; 70 (16.2 overs)
Naruemol Chaiwai 51 (45); Ni Ariani 2/18 (3 overs)		Rahmawati Pangestuti 17 (22); Onnicha Kamchomphu 4/13 (3.2 overs)

Thailand won by 74 runs
Terdthai Cricket Ground, Bangkok
Umpires: Senthil Kumar (Sin) and Denish Sevakumaran (Mas)

- Indonesia won the toss and elected to field.

18 December 2025
13:30
Scorecard

Malaysia; 154/4 (20 overs)	v	Myanmar; 65 (15.2 overs)
Mas Elysa 67 (52); Theint Soe 1/14 (2 overs)		Zar Win 22 (17); Nur Arianna Natsya 4/11 (3.2 overs)

Malaysia won by 89 runs
Terdthai Cricket Ground, Bangkok
Umpires: Samad Akbar (Tha) and Anwesh Bose (Idn)

- Malaysia won the toss and elected to bat.

=== Bronze medal match ===
19 December 2025
09:00
Scorecard

Myanmar; 61 (19.2 overs)	v	Indonesia; 63/5 (14.4 overs)
Zar Win 20 (23); Sang Maypriani 2/7 (4 overs)		Ni Putu Ayu Nanda Sakarini 28* (36); Zar win 2/13 (3 overs)

Indonesia won by 5 wickets
Terdthai Cricket Ground, Bangkok
Umpires: Loganathan Poobalan (Mas) and Ashwani Kumar Rana (Tha)

- Indonesia won the toss and elected to field

=== Gold medal match ===
19 December 2025
13:30
Scorecard

Malaysia; 58/8 (20 overs)	v	Thailand; 59/3 (9.5 overs)
Ainna Hamizah Hashim 13 (8); Thipatcha Putthawong 3/7 (4 overs)		Rosenanee Kanoh 21* (15); Elsa Hunter 2/16 (4 overs)

Thailand won by 7 wickets
Terdthai Cricket Ground, Bangkok
Umpires: Hardeep Jadeja (Sin) and Anand Natarajan (Sin)

- Thailand won the toss and elected to field.
