= 2018 Women's Twenty20 Asia Cup =

Cricket tournament in Malaysia

- Tournament logo
- Dates: 3 – 10 June 2018
- Administrator: Asian Cricket Council
- Cricket format: WT20I
- Tournament format: Group stage with finals
- Host: Malaysia
- Champions: Bangladesh (1st title)
- Runners-up: India
- Participants: 6
- Matches: 16
- Player of the series: (India) Harmanpreet Kaur
- Most runs: (India) Harmanpreet Kaur (215)
- Most wickets: (Pakistan) Nida Dar (11)

The 2018 Women's Twenty20 Asia Cup was the seventh edition of the ACC Women's Asia Cup, organized by the Asian Cricket Council (ACC). It took place between 3 and 10 June 2018 in Malaysia, and was the third edition played as a 20-over tournament. The tournament was contested among Bangladesh, India, Malaysia, Pakistan, Sri Lanka and Thailand. India were the defending champions.

On 6 June 2018, during the group stage, Bangladesh beat India by seven wickets. This was Bangladesh's first win against India in a women's international cricket match, and India's first ever loss in the Asia Cup. On 9 June 2018, Thailand beat Sri Lanka by four wickets to register their first ever win against a team from an ICC Full Member.

India were the first team to advance to the final, after they beat Pakistan by seven wickets in their final group game. They were joined by Bangladesh, who beat Malaysia by 70 runs in their final match. It was India's seventh consecutive Asia Cup final and the first for Bangladesh. Bangladesh beat India by three wickets in the final to win their first Asia Cup title, and became the only other team to win the title besides India.

A month after the conclusion of the tournament, the International Cricket Council (ICC) retrospectively gave all the fixtures full Women's Twenty20 International (WT20I) status.

== Squads ==
Bangladesh	India	Malaysia	Pakistan	Sri Lanka	Thailand
Salma Khatun (c); Rumana Ahmed; Nahida Akter; Jahanara Alam; Lily Rani Biswas; Jannatul Ferdus; Panna Ghosh; Fargana Hoque; Sanjida Islam; Fahima Khatun; Khadija Tul Kubra; Ayasha Rahman; Nigar Sultana; Shamima Sultana (wk); Sharmin Sultana	Harmanpreet Kaur (c); Taniya Bhatia (wk); Ekta Bisht; Rajeshwari Gayakwad; Jhulan Goswami; Veda Krishnamurthy; Smriti Mandhana; Mona Meshram; Shikha Pandey; Anuja Patil; Mithali Raj; Jemimah Rodrigues; Deepti Sharma; Pooja Vastrakar; Poonam Yadav	Winifred Duraisingam (c); Sasha Azmi; Zumika Azmi; Christina Baret; Ainna Hamizah Hashim; Jamahidaya Intan; Mahirah Izzati Ismail; Wan Julia; Dhanusri Muhunan; Nur Nadihirah; Aina Najwa; Nur Arianna Natsya; Yusrina Yaakop; Noor Hayati Zakaria; Yasmin Zulkifli	Bismah Maroof (c); Nain Abidi; Muneeba Ali; Anam Amin; Diana Baig; Nida Dar; Kainat Imtiaz; Javeria Khan; Nahida Khan; Sana Mir; Sidra Nawaz; Natalia Pervaiz; Javeria Rauf; Omaima Sohail; Nashra Sandhu	Shashikala Siriwardene (c); Hasini Perera (vc); Nilakshi de Silva; Inoshi Fernando; Nipuni Hansika; Achini Kulasuriya; Sugandika Kumari; Yashoda Mendis; Udeshika Prabodhani; Oshadi Ranasinghe; Inoka Ranaweera; Harshitha Samarawickrama; Anushka Sanjeewani; Malsha Shehani; Rebeca Vandort (wk)	Sornnarin Tippoch (c); Nattaya Boochatham; Naruemol Chaiwai; Natthakan Chantam; Rosenanee Kanoh; Onnicha Kamchompu; Nannapat Koncharoenkai; Suleeporn Laomi; Wongpaka Liengprasert; Ratanaporn Padunglerd; Sirintra Saengsakaorat; Waralee Saensong; Sainammin Saenya; Chanida Sutthiruang; Arriya Yenyueak

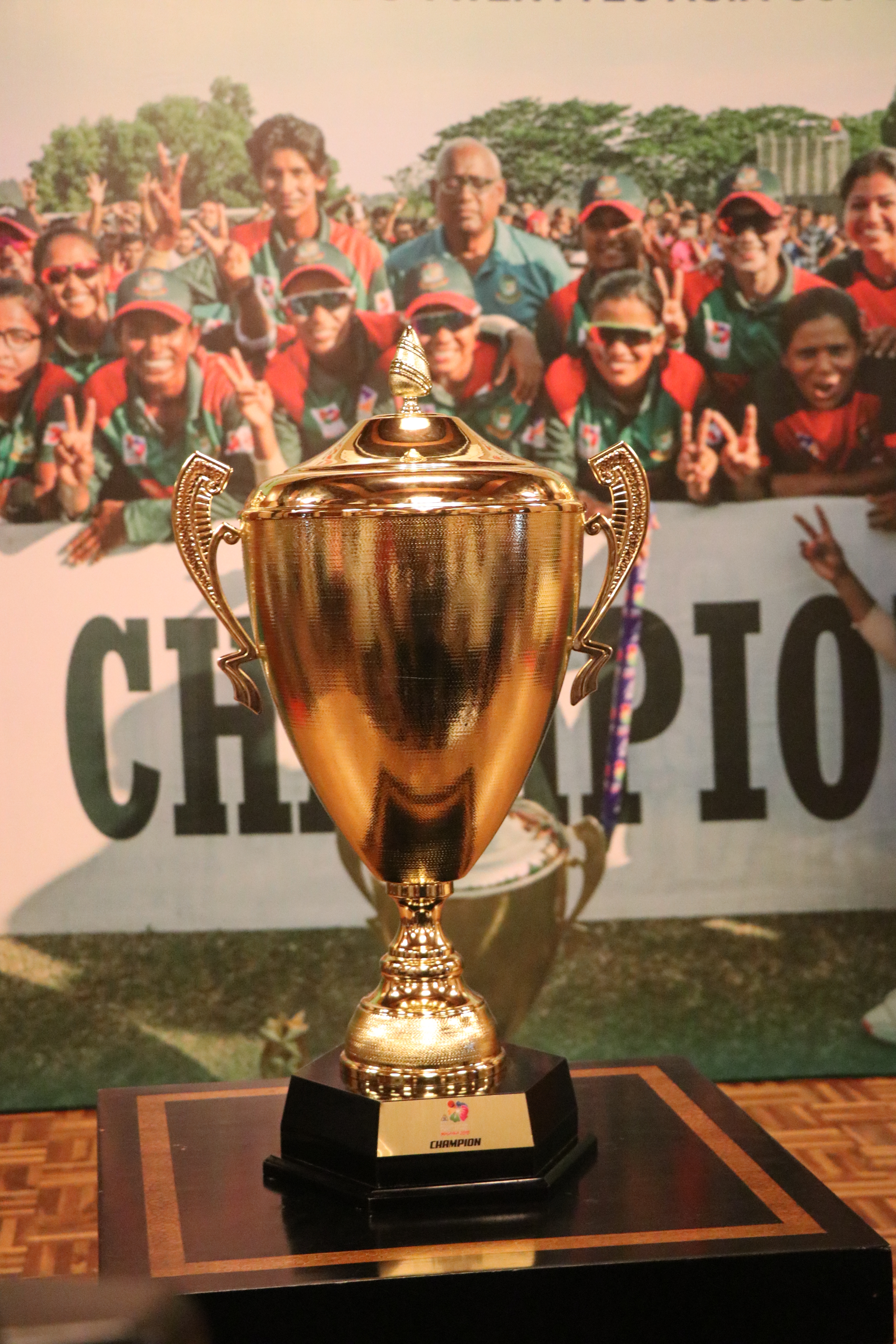
Women's T20 Asia Cup Trophy

== Points table ==
Pos	Team	Pld	W	L	T	NR	Pts	NRR
1	India	5	4	1	0	0	8	2.446
2	Bangladesh	5	4	1	0	0	8	1.116
3	Pakistan	5	3	2	0	0	6	1.850
4	Sri Lanka	5	2	3	0	0	4	0.891
5	Thailand	5	2	3	0	0	4	−1.026
6	Malaysia (H)	5	0	5	0	0	0	−5.302

Source: ESPNcricinfo
(H) Host

== Matches ==
The fixtures were confirmed by the ACC:

=== 1st match ===
3 June 2018
09:30
Scorecard

India; 169/3 (20 overs)	v	Malaysia; 27 (13.4 overs)
Mithali Raj 97* (69); Ainna Hamizah Hashim 1/30 (4 overs); Noor Hayati Zakaria 1/30 (4 overs)		Sasha Azmi 9 (10); Pooja Vastrakar 3/6 (3 overs)

India Women won by 142 runs
Kinrara Academy Oval, Kuala Lumpur
Umpires: Buddhi Pradhan (Nep) and Sarika Prasad (Sin)
Player of the match: Mithali Raj (Ind)

- India Women won the toss and elected to bat.
- Sasha Azmi, Zumika Azmi, Christina Baret, Winifred Duraisingam, Mas Elysa, Ainna Hamizah Hashim, Jamahidaya Intan, Mahirah Izzati Ismail, Nur Nadihirah, Yusrina Yaakop and Noor Hayati Zakaria (Mas) all made their WT20I debuts.

=== 2nd match ===
3 June 2018
09:30
Scorecard

Bangladesh; 63 (19.3 overs)	v	Sri Lanka; 64/4 (14.3 overs)
Ayasha Rahman 11 (27); Sugandika Kumari 3/17 (4 overs)		Nipuni Hansika 23 (31); Khadija Tul Kubra 3/13 (4 overs)

Sri Lanka Women won by 6 wickets
Royal Selangor Club, Kuala Lumpur
Umpires: Nitin Menon (Ind) and Shozab Raza (Pak)
Player of the match: Sugandika Kumari (SL)

- Sri Lanka Women won the toss and elected to field.

=== 3rd match ===
3 June 2018
14:00
Scorecard

Thailand; 67/8 (20 overs)	v	Pakistan; 70/2 (13.1 overs)
Sornnarin Tippoch 17 (37); Sana Mir 2/7 (3 overs)		Nahida Khan 38* (41); Sornnarin Tippoch 1/9 (4 overs)

Pakistan Women won by 8 wickets
Kinrara Academy Oval, Kuala Lumpur
Umpires: Viswanadan Kalidas (Mas) and Batumalai Ramani (Mas)
Player of the match: Nahida Khan (Pak)

- Thailand Women won the toss and elected to bat.
- Nattaya Boochatham, Naruemol Chaiwai, Natthakan Chantam, Nannapat Koncharoenkai, Suleeporn Laomi, Wongpaka Liengprasert, Ratanaporn Padunglerd, Sirintra Saengsakaorat, Sainammin Saenya, Chanida Sutthiruang and Sornnarin Tippoch (Tha) all made their WT20I debuts.

=== 4th match ===
4 June 2018
09:30
Scorecard

Pakistan; 95/5 (20 overs)	v	Bangladesh; 96/3 (17.5 overs)
Sana Mir 21 (23); Nahida Akter 2/23 (4 overs)		Shamima Sultana 31 (33); Anam Amin 1/9 (4 overs)

Bangladesh Women won by 7 wickets
Kinrara Academy Oval, Kuala Lumpur
Umpires: Viswanadan Kalidas (Mas) and Ranmore Martinesz (SL)
Player of the match: Fahima Khatun (Ban)

- Bangladesh Women won the toss and elected to field.

=== 5th match ===
4 June 2018
09:30
Scorecard

India; 132/4 (20 overs)	v	Thailand; 66/8 (20 overs)
Mona Meshram 32 (45); Wongpaka Liengprasert 2/16 (3 overs)		Nattaya Boochatham 21 (40); Harmanpreet Kaur 3/11 (3 overs)

India Women won by 66 runs
Royal Selangor Club, Kuala Lumpur
Umpires: Batumalai Ramani (Mas) and Narayanan Sivan (Mas)
Player of the match: Harmanpreet Kaur (Ind)

- Thailand Women won the toss and elected to field.
- Onnicha Kamchompu (Tha) made her WT20I debut.

=== 6th match ===
4 June 2018
14:00
Scorecard

Sri Lanka; 136/3 (20 overs)	v	Malaysia; 46/7 (20 overs)
Yasoda Mendis 36 (29); Sasha Azmi 1/12 (4 overs)		Christina Baret 14 (32); Nilakshi de Silva 3/13 (4 overs)

Sri Lanka Women won by 90 runs
Royal Selangor Club, Kuala Lumpur
Umpires: Masudur Rahman (Ban) and Sarika Prasad (Sin)
Player of the match: Nilakshi de Silva (SL)

- Malaysia Women won the toss and elected to field.
- Wan Julia (Mas) made her WT20I debut.

=== 7th match ===
6 June 2018
09:30
Scorecard

Pakistan; 136/4 (20 overs)	v	Sri Lanka; 113/9 (20 overs)
Bismah Maroof 60* (41); Sugandika Kumari 2/18 (4 overs)		Yasoda Mendis 25 (29); Nida Dar 5/21 (4 overs)

Pakistan Women won by 23 runs
Kinrara Academy Oval, Kuala Lumpur
Umpires: Nitin Menon (Ind) and Masudur Rahman (Ban)
Player of the match: Nida Dar (Pak)

- Sri Lanka Women won the toss and elected to field.
- Nida Dar (Pak) took her first five-wicket haul and the best bowling figures by a Pakistan woman in WT20Is.

=== 8th match ===
6 June 2018
09:30
Scorecard

Malaysia; 36/8 (20 overs)	v	Thailand; 37/1 (9 overs)
Sasha Azmi 9* (13); Wongpaka Liengprasert 2/10 (4 overs)		Naruemol Chaiwai 20* (28); Sasha Azmi 1/8 (3 overs)

Thailand Women won by 9 wickets
Royal Selangor Club, Kuala Lumpur
Umpires: Ranmore Martinesz (SL) and Buddhi Pradhan (Nep)
Player of the match: Wongpaka Liengprasert (Tha)

- Malaysia Women won the toss and elected to bat.

=== 9th match ===
6 June 2018
14:00
Scorecard

India; 141/7 (20 overs)	v	Bangladesh; 142/3 (19.4 overs)
Harmanpreet Kaur 42 (37); Rumana Ahmed 3/21 (4 overs)		Fargana Hoque 52* (46); Poonam Yadav 1/21 (4 overs)

Bangladesh Women won by 7 wickets
Kinrara Academy Oval, Kuala Lumpur
Umpires: Shozab Raza (Pak) and Batumalai Ramani (Mas)
Player of the match: Rumana Ahmed (Ban)

- India Women won the toss and elected to bat.
- This was Bangladesh's first win against India in T20Is.

=== 10th match ===
7 June 2018
09:30
Scorecard

Thailand; 60/8 (20 overs)	v	Bangladesh; 62/1 (11.1 overs)
Nattaya Boochatham 15 (21); Salma Khatun 2/6 (4 overs)		Ayasha Rahman 25* (28); Nigar Sultana 25* (28); Chanida Sutthiruang 1/14 (3 overs)

Bangladesh Women won by 9 wickets
Kinrara Academy Oval, Kuala Lumpur
Umpires: Viswanadan Kalidas (Mas) and Narayanan Sivan (Mas)
Player of the match: Salma Khatun (Ban)

- Bangladesh Women won the toss and elected to field.

=== 11th match ===
7 June 2018
09:30
Scorecard

Pakistan; 177/5 (20 overs)	v	Malaysia; 30 (18.4 overs)
Bismah Maroof 62 (37); Ainna Hamizah Hashim 1/29 (4 overs)		Winifred Duraisingam 11 (30); Nida Dar 4/5 (3.4 overs)

Pakistan Women won by 147 runs
Royal Selangor Club, Kuala Lumpur
Umpires: Nitin Menon (Ind) and Sarika Prasad (Sin)
Player of the match: Nida Dar (Pak)

- Malaysia Women won the toss and elected to field.
- Aina Najwa (Mas) made her WT20I debut.

=== 12th match ===
7 June 2018
14:00
Scorecard

Sri Lanka; 107/7 (20 overs)	v	India; 110/3 (18.5 overs)
Hasini Perera 46* (43); Ekta Bisht 2/15 (3 overs)		Veda Krishnamurthy 29* (23); Nilakshi de Silva 1/12 (2 overs)

India Women won by 7 wickets
Royal Selangor Club, Kuala Lumpur
Umpires: Masudur Rahman (Ban) and Shozab Raza (Pak)
Player of the match: Anuja Patil (Ind)

- Sri Lanka Women won the toss and elected to bat.
- Malsha Shehani (SL) made her WT20I debut.
- Mithali Raj (Ind) became the first cricketer to score 2,000 runs in WT20Is.

=== 13th match ===
9 June 2018
09:30
Scorecard

Pakistan; 72/7 (20 overs)	v	India; 75/3 (16.1 overs)
Sana Mir 20* (38); Ekta Bisht 3/14 (4 overs)		Smriti Mandhana 38 (40); Anam Amin 2/10 (4 overs)

India Women won by 7 wickets
Kinrara Academy Oval, Kuala Lumpur
Umpires: Ranmore Martinesz (SL) and Masudur Rahman (Ban)
Player of the match: Ekta Bisht (Ind)

- Pakistan Women won the toss and elected to bat.

=== 14th match ===
9 June 2018
09:30
Scorecard

Sri Lanka; 104 (20 overs)	v	Thailand; 105/6 (20 overs)
Anushka Sanjeewani 32 (45); Wongpaka Liengprasert 5/12 (4 overs)		Naruemol Chaiwai 43 (56); Nilakshi de Silva 2/17 (4 overs)

Thailand Women won by 4 wickets
Royal Selangor Club, Kuala Lumpur
Umpires: Viswanadan Kalidas (Mas) and Narayanan Sivan (Mas)
Player of the match: Wongpaka Liengprasert (Tha)

- Thailand Women won the toss and elected to field.
- Wongpaka Liengprasert became the first cricketer from Thailand to take a WT20I five-wicket haul.

=== 15th match ===
9 June 2018
14:00
Scorecard

Bangladesh; 130/4 (20 overs)	v	Malaysia; 60/9 (20 overs)
Shamima Sultana 43 (54); Winifred Duraisingam 2/19 (4 overs)		Winifred Duraisingam 17 (35); Rumana Ahmed 3/8 (4 overs)

Bangladesh Women won by 70 runs
Kinrara Academy Oval, Kuala Lumpur
Umpires: Buddhi Pradhan (Nep) and Shozab Raza (Pak)
Player of the match: Shamima Sultana

- Bangladesh Women won the toss and elected to bat.
- Dhanusri Muhunan (Mas) made her WT20I debut.

== Final ==
10 June 2018
14:00
Scorecard

India; 112/9 (20 overs)	v	Bangladesh; 113/7 (20 overs)
Harmanpreet Kaur 56 (42); Rumana Ahmed 2/22 (4 overs)		Nigar Sultana 27 (24); Poonam Yadav 4/9 (4 overs)

Bangladesh Women won by 3 wickets
Kinrara Academy Oval, Kuala Lumpur
Umpires: Ranmore Martinesz (SL) Shozab Raza (Pak)
Player of the match: Rumana Ahmed (Ban)

- Bangladesh Women won the toss and elected to field.

== Broadcasters ==
Bangladesh - GTV India- STAR NETWORK
