= List of Malaysia women Twenty20 International cricketers =

This is a list of Malaysian women Twenty20 International cricketers. A Twenty20 International (T20I) is an international cricket match between two representative teams played under the rules of Twenty20 cricket. In April 2018, the International Cricket Council (ICC) granted full international status to Twenty20 women's matches played between member sides from 1 July 2018 onwards. In addition, the ICC retrospectively gave T20I status to all matches played at the 2018 Women's Twenty20 Asia Cup, meaning that Malaysia women had made their debut in the format on 3 June 2018 against India in Kuala Lumpur.

The list is arranged in the order in which each player won her first Twenty20 cap for Malaysia. Where more than one player won her first Twenty20 cap in the same match, those players are listed alphabetically by surname.

== Key ==
General

- ‡ – Captain
- † – Wicket-keeper
- First – Year of debut
- Last – Year of latest game
- Mat – Number of matches played

Batting

- Runs – Runs scored in career
- HS – Highest score
- Avg – Runs scored per dismissal
- * – Batsman remained not out
- 50 – Number of half centuries

Bowling

- Wkt – Wickets taken in career
- BBI – Best bowling in an innings
- Ave – Average runs per wicket

Fielding

- Ca – Catches taken
- St – Stumpings affected

== List of players ==
Statistics are correct as of 18 September 2026.

Malaysia women T20I cricketers
General					Batting				Bowling				Fielding		Ref
No.	Name	First	Last	Mat	Runs	HS	Avg	50	Balls	Wkt	BBI	Ave	Ca	St	Ref
1	Ainna Hamizah Hashim	2018	2026	110	1003	61	14.97	2	1,657	65	5/4	22.12	13	0	
2	Christina Baret†	2018	2023	21	133	29*	10.23	0	12	0	–	–	3	2	
3	Winifred Duraisingam‡	2018	2026	104	1,503	73	15.98	4	1,688	67	3/9	23.19	17	0	
4	Jamahidaya Intan	2018	2024	50	235	27*	9.40	0	168	4	2/25	36.50	4	0	
5	Mahirah Izzati Ismail	2018	2026	91	808	48*	11.54	0	1,601	76	5/11	16.42	31	0	
6	Mas Elysa‡	2018	2026	110	1,719	67	18.89	7	889	44	6/3	18.45	33	0	
7	Noor Hayati Zakaria	2018	2022	22	52	17*	7.42	0	246	6	1/7	39.33	0	0	
8	Nur Nadihirah	2018	2019	14	11	3	1.57	0	251	6	2/10	36.00	1	0	
9	Sasha Azmi	2018	2022	27	63	16*	7.87	0	493	26	4/20	14.19	5	0	
10	Yusrina Yaakop	2018	2023	31	233	38	8.96	0	–	–	–	–	6	0	
11	Zumika Azmi	2018	2022	12	44	17*	7.33	0	156	3	1/5	56.33	2	0	
12	Wan Julia†	2018	2026	88	962	52	12.82	1	–	–	–	–	22	19	
13	Aina Najwa†	2018	2026	66	207	20*	8.62	0	24	1	1/8	8.00	15	8	
14	Dhanusri Muhunan	2018	2026	38	206	28	14.71	0	203	5	3/5	36.60	3	0	
15	Jennifer Francis‡	2018	2018	2	2	2	2.00	0	–	–	–	–	1	0	
16	Nik Nur Atiela	2018	2024	34	22	11*	5.50	0	450	26	3/6	14.69	1	0	
17	Nor Syahira	2018	2018	4	19	19	19.00	0	24	0	–	–	1	0	
18	Nur Alliah Asyqin	2018	2019	4	1	1	1.00	0	18	0	–	–	0	0	
19	Nur Natasya Nazira	2018	2018	4	–	–	–	–	54	3	1/14	17.66	1	0	
20	Emylia Eliani	2018	2019	10	115	34	14.37	0	136	11	3/13	8.81	3	0	
21	Wan Nor Zulaika	2018	2023	28	33	18*	5.50	0	299	8	2/29	36.25	5	0	
22	Aisya Eleesa	2018	2026	82	60	13	3.52	0	1237	54	3/11	19.74	20	0	
23	Amalin Sorfina	2018	2026	15	11	5	3.66	0	72	1	1/7	83.00	1	0	
24	Fatin Nazirah	2018	2018	1	–	–	–	–	6	0	–	–	0	0	
25	Nur Dania Aqeelah†	2018	2018	2	32	31*	–	0	–	–	–	–	2	0	
26	Nurul Syahira	2018	2018	3	1	1	0.50	0	24	0	–	–	0	0	
27	Elsa Hunter	2019	2026	56	861	69*	20.02	3	210	15	5/9	11.33	15	0	
28	Nur Arianna Natsya	2019	2026	88	206	25*	5.42	0	934	41	4/11	22.70	28	0	
29	Nur Dania Syuhada	2022	2026	87	242	26	7.56	0	1,584	61	4/14	20.91	12	0	
30	Nurilyaa Natasya	2022	2022	4	8	8*	4.00	0	–	–	–	–	1	0	
31	Nur Aishah	2023	2024	8	6	6*	–	0	–	–	–	–	1	0	
32	Musfirah Nur Ainaa	2023	2026	8	2	2*	2.00	0	12	0	–	–	1	0	
33	Irdina Beh Nabil	2023	2026	26	88	19	8.00	0	–	–	–	–	2	0	
34	Suabika Manivannan	2024	2026	12	11	8	2.75	0	155	4	1/3	48.25	0	0	
35	Nur Izzatul Syafiqa	2024	2026	14	41	11	6.83	0	6	0	–	–	2	0	
36	Nazatul Hidayah Husna	2025	2026	9	35	10	5.83	0	–	–	–	–	1	0	
37	Marsya Qistina	2025	2025	1	–	–	–	–	6	0	–	–	0	0	
38	Nur Alya Batrisyia	2025	2025	5	–	–	–	–	30	2	1/6	17.00	0	0	
39	Nurin Imanina	2026	2026	9	33	12	8.25	0	102	11	4/12	9.00	6	0	
40	Nur Qalysha	2026	2026	16	44	14	4.88	0	119	5	3/21	26.20	1	0	
41	Nur Qaireen	2026	2026	2	11	10	5.50	0	–	–	–	–	0	0	
42	Nur Aliya	2026	2026	1	0	0	0.00	0	–	–	–	–	1	0	
43	Aina Umaira	2026	2026	1	–	–	–	–	12	0	–	–	0	0	
