= Nur Nadihirah =

Malaysian cricketer (born 1994)

Personal information
- Full name: Nadhirah Nasruddin
- Born: 21 April 1994 (age 32)
- Batting: Right-handed
- Bowling: Right-arm offbreak

International information
- National side: Malaysia
- T20I debut (cap 8): 3 June 2018 v India
- Last T20I: 29 August 2019 v Singapore

Career statistics
Competition	WT20I
Matches	14
Runs scored	11
Batting average	1.57
100s/50s	0/0
Top score	3
Balls bowled	251
Wickets	6
Bowling average	36.00
5 wickets in innings	0
10 wickets in match	0
Best bowling	2/10
Catches/stumpings	1/–
Medal record
Representing Malaysia
Women's Cricket
Southeast Asian Games
Bronze medal – third place	2017 Kuala Lumpur	Twenty20
- Source: ESPNCricinfo, 8 October 2024

Nur Nadihirah (born 21 April 1994) is a Malaysian cricketer. She made her Women's Twenty20 International (WT20I) debut for Malaysia against India on 3 June 2018, in the 2018 Women's Twenty20 Asia Cup.
