= Jennifer Francis (cricketer) =

Malaysian cricketer (born 1983)

Personal information
- Full name: Jennifer Francis
- Born: December 18, 1983 (age 42)
- Batting: Right-handed

International information
- National side: Malaysia
- T20I debut (cap 15): 9 August 2018 v Singapore
- Last T20I: 10 August 2018 v Singapore

Career statistics
Competition	WT20I
Matches	2
Runs scored	2
Batting average	2.00
100s/50s	0/0
Top score	2
Catches/stumpings	1/–
- Source: Cricinfo, 21 August 2019

Jennifer Francis (born 18 December 1983) is a Malaysian former cricketer.

She made her T20I debut on 9 August 2018, against Singapore. She was a member of the national team at the 2010 Asian Games and 2014 Asian Games.
