= Malsha Shehani =

Sri Lankan cricketer (born 1995)

Personal information
- Full name: Malsha Shehani
- Born: 5 June 1995 (age 31)
- Batting: Right-handed
- Bowling: Right-arm medium-fast
- Role: Bowler

International information
- National side: Sri Lanka
- Only ODI (cap 69): 7 February 2017 v India
- T20I debut (cap 44): 7 June 2018 v India
- Last T20I: 19 February 2023 v New Zealand
Medal record
Representing Sri Lanka
Women's Cricket
South Asian Games
Silver medal – second place	2019 Kathmandu/Pokhara	Team
- Source: ESPNcricinfo, 19 February 2023

Malsha Shehani (born 5 June 1995) is a Sri Lankan cricketer. Her debut and so far only Women's One Day International (WODI) game was against India in the 2017 Women's Cricket World Cup Qualifier on 7 February 2017. On 7 June 2018, she made her Women's Twenty20 International cricket (WT20I) debut, also against India, in the 2018 Women's Twenty20 Asia Cup.

In November 2019, she was named in Sri Lanka's squad for the women's cricket tournament at the 2019 South Asian Games. The Sri Lankan team won the silver medal, losing to Bangladesh by two runs in the final. In July 2022, she was named in Sri Lanka's team for the cricket tournament at the 2022 Commonwealth Games in Birmingham, England.
