= Jamahidaya Intan =

Malaysian cricketer (born 1996)

Personal information
- Full name: Jamahidaya Intan
- Born: 11 September 1996 (age 30)
- Batting: Right-handed
- Bowling: Right-arm medium

International information
- National side: Malaysia
- T20I debut (cap 4): 3 June 2018 v India
- Last T20I: 20 July 2024 v Thailand
Medal record
Representing Malaysia
Women's Cricket
Southeast Asian Games
Bronze medal – third place	2017 Kuala Lumpur	Twenty20
- Source: ESPNCricinfo, 8 October 2024

Jamahidaya Intan (born 11 September 1996) is a Malaysian cricketer. She made her Women's Twenty20 International (WT20I) debut for Malaysia against India on 3 June 2018, in the 2018 Women's Twenty20 Asia Cup. In April 2021, she was one of 15 players to be awarded a contract by the Malaysian Cricket Association, the first time female cricketers for the Malaysian team had been granted contracts.

In November 2021, she was named in Malaysia's side for the 2021 ICC Women's T20 World Cup Asia Qualifier tournament in the United Arab Emirates. In October 2022, she played for Malaysia in Women's Twenty20 Asia Cup. In September 2023, she was selected in Malaysia's 2023 Asian Games squad.
