= Vivek Vedagiri =

Singaporean cricketer (born 1981)

Personal information
- Born: September 9, 1981 (age 45)
- Role: Wicketkeeper

International information
- National side: Singapore
Medal record
Men's Cricket
Representing Singapore
Southeast Asian Games
Gold medal – first place	2017 Kuala Lumpur	Twenty20
Silver medal – second place	2017 Kuala Lumpur	50 over
- Source: Cricinfo, 29 December 2017

Vivek Vedagiri (born 9 September 1981) is a Singaporean cricketer. He made his List A debut in the 2006 ACC Trophy and was a member of the Singaporean cricket team at the 2009 ICC World Cricket League Division Six tournament.

Vedagiri was a member of the national team which won the gold medal in the men's T20 cricket tournament and was also part of the national side which won the silver medal in the men's 50-over tournament after an embarrassing defeat with a margin of 251 runs in the finals against Malaysia.
