= Ratanaporn Padunglerd =

Thai cricketer (born 1990)

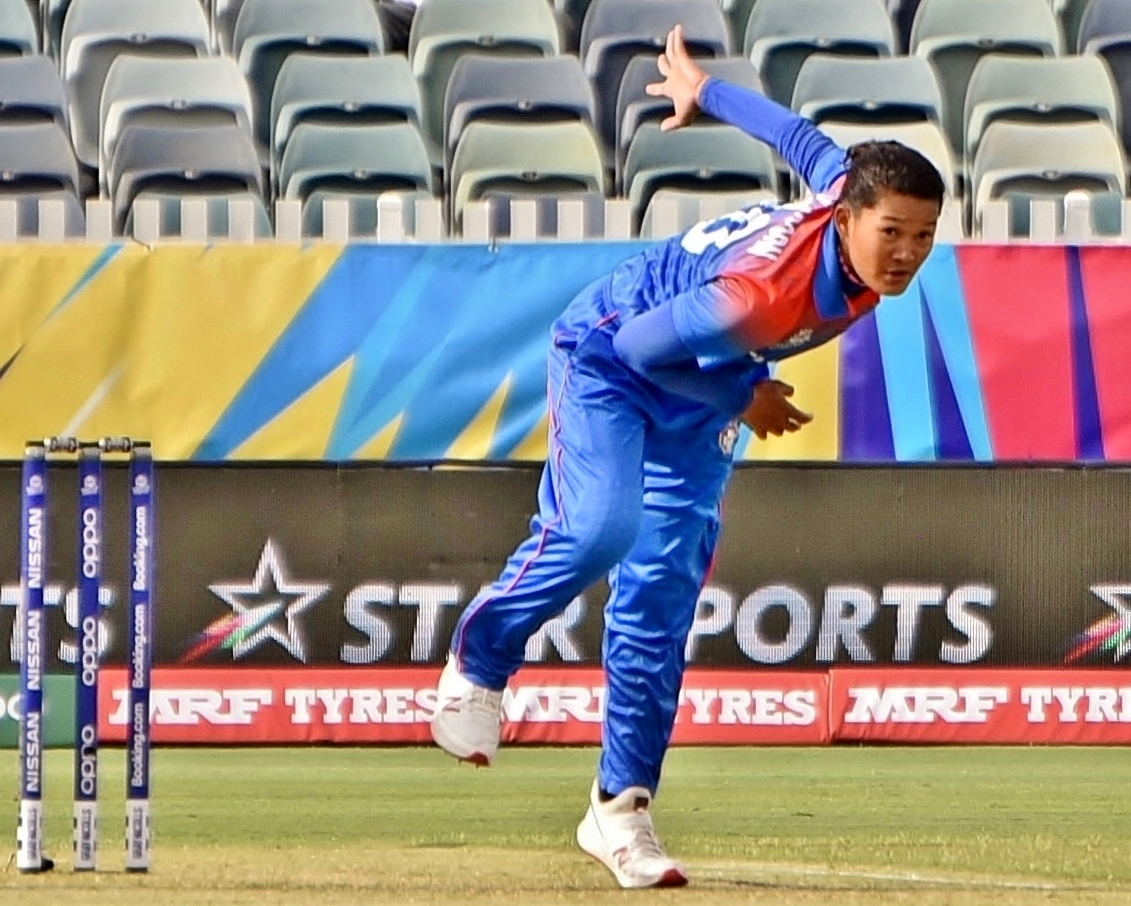
- Padunglerd bowling for Thailand during the 2020 ICC Women's T20 World Cup

Personal information
- Born: 14 March 1990 (age 36); Sa Kaeo, Thailand
- Batting: Right-handed
- Bowling: Right-arm medium
- Role: All-rounder

International information
- National side: Thailand
- T20I debut (cap 7): 3 June 2018 v Pakistan
- Last T20I: 30 August 2021 v Zimbabwe

Career statistics
Competition	WT20I
Matches	40
Runs scored	62
Batting average	5.63
100s/50s	0/0
Top score	158
Balls bowled	457
Wickets	20
Bowling average	20.20
5 wickets in innings	0
10 wickets in match	0
Best bowling	3/5
Catches/stumpings	4/–
Medal record
Representing Thailand
Women's Cricket
Southeast Asian Games
Gold medal – first place	2017 Kuala Lumpur	Twenty20
- Source: Cricinfo, 30 August 2021

Ratanaporn Padunglerd (Thai:รัตนาภรณ์ ผดุงเลิศ, born 14 March 1990) is a Thai cricketer. She played for the Thailand women's national cricket team in the 2017 Women's Cricket World Cup Qualifier in February 2017. In June 2018, she was named in Thailand's squad for the 2018 ICC Women's World Twenty20 Qualifier tournament. She made her Women's Twenty20 International (WT20I) debut for Thailand against Pakistan on 3 June 2018, in the 2018 Women's Twenty20 Asia Cup.

In August 2019, she was named in Thailand's squad for the 2019 ICC Women's World Twenty20 Qualifier tournament in Scotland. In January 2020, she was named in Thailand's squad for the 2020 ICC Women's T20 World Cup in Australia.
