= Wongpaka Liengprasert =

Thai cricketer

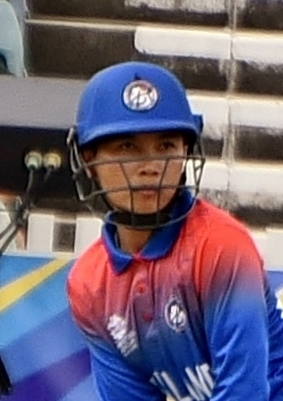
- Liengprasert batting for Thailand during the 2020 ICC Women's T20 World Cup

Personal information
- Born: 21 July 1993 (age 33); Uttaradit, Thailand
- Batting: Right-handed
- Bowling: Right-arm medium

International information
- National side: Thailand
- T20I debut (cap 6): 3 June 2018 v Pakistan
- Last T20I: 30 August 2021 v Zimbabwe

Career statistics
Competition	WT20I
Matches	39
Runs scored	123
Batting average	10.25
100s/50s	0/0
Top score	28*
Balls bowled	195
Wickets	13
Bowling average	11.38
5 wickets in innings	1
10 wickets in match	0
Best bowling	5/12
Catches/stumpings	7/–
Medal record
Women's Cricket
Representing Thailand
Southeast Asian Games
Gold medal – first place	2017 Kuala Lumpur	Twenty20
- Source: ESPNCricinfo, 21 November 2021

Wongpaka Liengprasert (Thai:วงค์ผกา เลี้ยงประเสริฐ, born 21 July 1993) is a Thai cricketer, who has played for the women's national cricket team. She made her international debut in 2013 at the 2013 ICC Women's World Twenty20 Qualifier. She also represented Thailand in the 2015 ICC Women's World Twenty20 Qualifier. Wongpaka also played in the 2016 Women's Twenty20 Asia Cup which was held in Thailand.

She too was also the part of the Thai women's cricket team which emerged as the champions in the inaugural edition of the women's T20 cricket tournament at the Southeast Asian Games, which was introduced in the 2017 Southeast Asian Games. Thailand secured the gold medal after recording a 23 run victory over Indonesia in the women's cricket final where she played a crucial role by bowling a magical spell of 4/16 in the low-scoring affair. Wongpaka Liengprasert played a key role in winning the gold medal for her country at the multi-sport event, as she was the leading wicket taker in the tournament with 13 wickets.

In June 2018, during Thailand's final group-stage match in the 2018 Women's Twenty20 Asia Cup, against Sri Lanka, she took five wickets for twelve runs, and was named the player of the match. It was Thailand's first ever win against a Full Member side. She finished the tournament as the leading wicket-taker for Thailand, with nine dismissals in five matches.

In June 2018, she was named in Thailand's squad for the 2018 ICC Women's World Twenty20 Qualifier tournament. She made her Women's Twenty20 International (WT20I) debut for Thailand on 3 June 2018, in the 2018 Women's Twenty20 Asia Cup.

In August 2019, she was named in Thailand's squad for the 2019 ICC Women's World Twenty20 Qualifier tournament in Scotland. In January 2020, she was named in Thailand's squad for the 2020 ICC Women's T20 World Cup in Australia. In November 2021, she was named in Thailand's team for the 2021 Women's Cricket World Cup Qualifier tournament in Zimbabwe. She played in Thailand's first match of the tournament, on 21 November 2021 against Zimbabwe.
