= Christina Baret =

Malaysian cricketer (born 1992)

Personal information
- Full name: Christina Nina Anak Baret
- Born: 16 June 1992 (age 34)
- Batting: Left-handed
- Role: Wicket-keeper

International information
- National side: Malaysia
- T20I debut (cap 2): 3 June 2018 v India
- Last T20I: 14 June 2023 v United Arab Emirates

Career statistics
Competition	WT20I
Matches	21
Runs scored	133
Batting average	10.23
100s/50s	0/0
Top score	29*
Catches/stumpings	3/2
Medal record
Representing Malaysia
Women's Cricket
Southeast Asian Games
Bronze medal – third place	2017 Kuala Lumpur	Twenty20
- Source: ESPNcricinfo, 8 October 2024

Christina Baret (born 16 June 1992) is a Malaysian cricketer, who plays for women's national cricket team. A wicket-keeper and left-handed batter, Baret was a member of the Malaysian cricket team at the 2014 Asian Games. Baret was also part of the Malaysian team which finished third in the Women's cricket tournament at the 2017 Southeast Asian Games after beating Singapore in the bronze medal contest by 2 wickets. In the 3rd-place playoff she topscored with an unbeaten 22 runs and played a key role in an easy run chase against Singapore to secure the bronze medal.

== Career ==
She made her Women's Twenty20 International (WT20I) debut for Malaysia on 3 June 2018, in the 2018 Women's Twenty20 Asia Cup.
