= List of Thailand women Twenty20 International cricketers =

This is a list of Thai women Twenty20 International cricketers. A Twenty20 International is an international cricket match between two representative teams. A Twenty20 International is played under the rules of Twenty20 cricket. In April 2018, the International Cricket Council (ICC) granted full international status to Twenty20 women's matches played between member sides from 1 July 2018 onwards. The Thailand women's team had already made their Twenty20 International debut on 3 June against Pakistan in Kuala Lumpur during the 2018 Women's Twenty20 Asia Cup, a tournament for which the ICC had retrospectively given all the fixtures full Twenty20 International status.

The list is arranged in the order in which each player won her first Twenty20 cap. Where more than one player won her first Twenty20 cap in the same match, those players are listed alphabetically by surname.

== Key ==
General

- ‡ – Captain
- † – Wicket-keeper
- First – Year of debut
- Last – Year of latest game
- Mat – Number of matches played

Batting

- Runs – Runs scored in career
- HS – Highest score
- Avg – Runs scored per dismissal
- * – Batsman remained not out
- 50 – Half-centuries scored
- 100 – Centuries scored

Bowling

- Wkt – Wickets taken in career
- BBI – Best bowling in an innings
- Ave – Average runs per wicket

Fielding

- Ca – Catches taken
- St – Stumpings affected

== Players ==
Statistics are correct as of 17 September 2026.

General					Batting					Bowling				Fielding		Ref
No.	Name	First	Last	Mat	Runs	HS	Avg	50	100	Balls	Wkt	BBI	Ave	Ca	St	Ref
1	Nattaya Boochatham	2018	2025	116	1,035	56	12.62	2	0	1,996	126	5/5	10.89	27	0	
2	Naruemol Chaiwai‡†	2018	2026	142	2,111	83*	23.19	5	0	–	–	–	–	49	1	
3	Natthakan Chantam	2018	2026	129	2,792	148*	31.02	12	1	–	–	–	–	38	0	
4	Nannapat Koncharoenkai‡†	2018	2026	146	2,896	75	29.25	12	0	–	–	–	–	43	63	
5	Suleeporn Laomi	2018	2026	122	198	17	6.60	0	0	2,348	140	4/9	11.84	31	0	
6	Wongpaka Liengprasert	2018	2021	39	123	28*	10.25	0	0	195	13	5/12	11.38	7	0	
7	Ratanaporn Padunglerd	2018	2021	40	62	15*	5.63	0	0	457	20	3/5	20.20	4	0	
8	Sirintra Saengsakaorat	2018	2018	10	30	14	10.00	0	0	–	–	–	–	0	0	
9	Sainammin Saenya	2018	2019	15	2	2*	–	0	0	26	3	1/0	3.00	1	0	
10	Chanida Sutthiruang	2018	2026	145	1,279	46*	13.90	0	0	1,972	94	5/4	14.89	30	0	
11	Sornnarin Tippoch‡	2018	2023	75	344	37*	10.75	0	0	1,033	51	4/4	13.62	28	0	
12	Onnicha Kamchomphu	2018	2026	143	173	26	4.43	0	0	2,415	156	5/18	11.78	45	0	
13	Thipatcha Putthawong	2019	2026	111	189	37	13.50	0	0	2,327	173	5/3	9.27	9	0	
14	Arriya Yenyueak	2019	2019	3	–	–	–	–	–	1	1	1/0	0.00	0	0	
15	Soraya Lateh	2019	2020	18	3	3*	–	0	0	48	2	1/21	32.50	10	0	
16	Rosenanee Kanoh	2019	2025	49	219	21*	9.52	0	0	144	3	1/10	36.66	11	0	
17	Phannita Maya	2022	2026	105	565	35	11.77	0	0	1311	76	5/3	15.90	36	0	
18	Sunida Chaturongrattana	2022	2026	76	107	24	8.23	0	0	1260	80	5/3	11.22	8	0	
19	Nanthita Boonsukham	2022	2022	7	12	12	12.00	0	0	60	2	1/11	34.50	0	0	
20	Suwanan Khiaoto†	2022	2026	51	354	74	12.20	1	0	–	–	–	–	9	3	
21	Aphisara Suwanchonrathi	2022	2026	48	377	29	11.42	0	0	96	4	2/14	20.00	11	0	
22	Banthida Leephatthana	2022	2023	4	6	6*	–	0	0	–	–	–	–	0	0	
23	Chayanisa Phengpaen	2024	2026	10	4	4*	–	0	0	83	4	3/14	17.75	1	0	
24	Nannaphat Chaihan	2024	2026	17	13	6	2.60	0	0	–	–	–	–	1	0	
25	Thanrada Seesawan	2026	2026	1	0	0	0.00	0	0	–	–	–	–	0	0	
26	Arrikan Phuengkho	2026	2026	1	4	4	4.00	0	0	–	–	–	–	0	0	
27	Koranit Suwanchonrathi	2026	2026	1	9	9*	–	0	0	12	1	1/12	12.00	0	0	
28	Naomi Hamilton	2026	2026	3	1	1	0.33	0	0	–	–	–	–	1	0	
