= Winifred Duraisingam =

Malaysian cricketer (born 1993)

Personal information
- Full name: Winifred Anne Duraisingam
- Born: 6 April 1993 (age 33); Malaysia
- Batting: Right-handed
- Bowling: Right-arm medium
- Role: All-rounder

International information
- National side: Malaysia
- T20I debut (cap 3): 3 June 2018 v India
- Last T20I: 28 May 2026 v Hong Kong

Career statistics
Competition	WT20I
Matches	70
Runs scored	1,065
Batting average	17.17
100s/50s	0/3
Top score	73
Balls bowled	1,205
Wickets	50
Bowling average	21.78
5 wickets in innings	0
10 wickets in match	0
Best bowling	3/9
Catches/stumpings	10/0
Medal record
Representing Malaysia
Women's Cricket
Southeast Asian Games
Bronze medal – third place	2017 Kuala Lumpur	Twenty20
Bronze medal – third place	2025 Thailand	T10
- Source: ESPNCricinfo, 8 October 2024

Winifred Anne Duraisingam (born 6 April 1993) is a Malaysian cricketer and the current captain of the women's national cricket team. A right-handed all-rounder, she opens the batting, and is also an opening medium pace bowler.

== Early life ==
Duraisingam started playing cricket when she was eight years old, in the backyard of her home and in the nearby streets. Her brother, Derek, played street cricket with other boys. One day, she asked them whether she could join in and bat. They refused, because she was a small girl, and they were scared she would get hurt. Her uncle, David, then offered to teach her how to bowl. Although she accepted that offer, she also considered batting to be more appealing. He therefore suggested a rule that anyone taking a wicket would be next to bat.

With the benefit of the bowling tuition, and practice, Duraisingam eventually renewed her request to join in with the street cricket. Surprised and impressed by her action and pace, the boys had no option but to relent. In 2021, Duraisingam told SpogoNews:

"It felt really fun when I started to bowl and take wickets. The boys ended up keeping quiet and felt shy because a girl was taking their wickets. From there onwards, I enjoyed bowling more and the fire to continue bowling kept increasing."

At the age of 13, and with her uncle's encouragement, Duraisingam began playing for the Kuala Langat Club, as the only girl in the team. Before long, while playing in an interclub tournament match for Kuala Langat against Royal Selangor Club, she took the wicket of a former captain of the Malaysia men's national team, Hector Durairatnam, who has been described as "Malaysian cricket's living treasure". After the match, Durairatnam approached her uncle and asked who was the "small boy" who had bowled against him. Her uncle replied, "that's my niece". Duraisingam was then invited to participate in a selection process for the national team.

Duraisingam was a fan of Australian bowler Brett Lee from an early age. Later, when she became more serious about her batting, she gained inspiration from Kumar Sangakkara of Sri Lanka. She also credits her uncle for teaching her the game. She found the task of juggling cricket with her schooling a challenge, but says that she succeeded "... by God’s grace and of course my family's support."

While juggling her sports career, Duraisingam graduated from Universiti Kebangsaan Malaysia (UKM) in 2021 with a degree in Education, majoring in Sports and Recreation.

== Domestic career ==
In 2014, Duraisingam played a season of club cricket in Adelaide, Australia.

In July 2019, she participated in the MCA 3rd Women's T20 Championship, as a member of the Rmaf Tudm team. The following April, she played in the 4th Championship, for the same team (rebadged as the Tentera Udara Diraja Malaysia team). On 29 April 2019, in her team's match against Negeri Sembilan, she took 4/3, to help the team to victory by nine wickets.

In December 2019/January 2020, Duraisingam led the Northern Queens team to victory in the Malaysian Super Women League (MSWL) tournament. In particular, she scored 61 runs, in an innings she considers to be her best ever, in the final against Eastern Lionesses.

In 2020, Duraisingam was one of the eight women who took the field in the Men's MCA T20 Super Series, which she has said gave her "... a new sight on how to become a better cricketer."

== International career ==
=== 2007–2014: Early years ===
Duraisingam first participated in national team selection matches, and represented Malaysia, in 2007, at the age of 14. That year, she was selected in both the U-19 and senior national teams. Initially, she played only as an opening bowler, a role she has continued to play. However, at the age of 15 she went to Australia for a training camp, watched how the female cricketers batted there, and was motivated to improve her batting skills. Since then, she has also batted in the middle order, and, more recently, in the top order.

In December 2008, Duraisingam was part of a Malaysian U-19 team that finished as runner-up in the ACC Under-19 Women's Championship in Chiang Mai, Thailand. The team defeated Hong Kong in the semi-final by two runs, but lost to Nepal in the final by seven wickets. In mid-2010, she was appointed as the U-19 captain.

=== 2014–2021: Captain of amateur team ===
In 2014, Duraisingam became the captain of the national team. In 2017, she played in the Malaysian T20 Women Quadrangual Series, but did not captain the team. The other teams competing in the series were the national teams from Tanzania and Thailand, and a team representing the Sri Lanka Army. In the match against Sri Lanka Army, Duraisingam top scored with 36, but Sri Lanka Army won by seven wickets. In the match against Tanzania, which Malaysia won, she top scored with 45*. Malaysia finished third in the series, which was won by Sri Lanka Army.

In August 2017, Duraisingam captained Malaysia in the Women's twenty20 tournament at the 2017 Southeast Asian Games. The tournament matches were held at Kinrara Oval in Selangor, Malaysia. During the tournament, Duraisingam batted at number three in the batting order, and top-scored in consecutive games, with 25* against Singapore and 23* against Thailand.

On 3 June 2018, Duraisingam made her Women's Twenty20 International (WT20I) debut for, and also captained, Malaysia against India at the Kinrara Academy Oval, Kuala Lumpur, in the first match of the 2018 Women's Twenty20 Asia Cup. The match was also Malaysia's first ever WT20I. Duraisingham later told Female Cricket that the tournament had been "a great learning experience" for the whole of her team.

In January 2019, Duraisingam was Malaysia's captain in the 2019 Thailand Women's T20 Smash in Bangkok, Thailand. On 16 January 2019, she led the team to its first ever WT20I victory, against China, by 6 wickets. Her highest score in the tournament was 56*, in a match against Thailand A that did not have full T20I status. The following month, she again captained Malaysia, in the 2019 ICC Women's Qualifier Asia, also held in Bangkok. In that tournament, she took nine wickets, the most for Malaysia, with a best performance of 3/10 against Hong Kong.

Duraisingam's and Malaysia's final WT20Is in 2019 were played against Singapore at the Indian Association Ground in Singapore, for the annual Saudari Cup. In that series, Duraisingam led her team to a 3–0 clean sweep. In the second and third matches of the series, she also top scored for Malaysia, and was player of the match, with 40* and 66*, respectively.

=== 2021–present: Contracted player ===
In April 2021, Duraisingam was one of 15 players to be awarded a contract by the Malaysian Cricket Association, the first time female cricketers for the Malaysian team had been granted contracts. "Here on, there will be no time to relax," she told the ICC.

In November 2021, she was named as the captain of Malaysia's side for the 2021 ICC Women's T20 World Cup Asia Qualifier tournament in Dubai, United Arab Emirates. She led Malaysia to fourth place in the tournament, with wins against Kuwait and Bhutan. Her best batting performance was 44 in 40 balls against Kuwait. Her best bowling figures, 2/15, were against Hong Kong, and included a double-wicket maiden in the first over of Hong Kong's innings.

Two months later, in January 2022, she was the home team's captain when Malaysia hosted the 2022 Commonwealth Games Cricket Qualifier in Kuala Lumpur. During that tournament, she top scored for Malaysia with 42* in 54 balls in the team's loss to Sri Lanka. More importantly, in Malaysia's final match of the tournament, against Kenya, on what has been described as "... one of the biggest days in the history of Malaysian cricket ...", she led the team to an upset victory, an outcome that made the front pages of newspaper sport sections in Malaysia.

In September 2023, she was selected in Malaysia's 2023 Asian Games squad.

== FairBreak career ==
In March 2022, Duraisingam was recruited by FairBreak Global to play in its privately run 2022 FairBreak Invitational T20 in Dubai. She was allocated to the Tornadoes team.
