= Ainna Hamizah Hashim =

Malaysian cricketer (born 2000)

Personal information
- Full name: Ainna Hamizah Hashim
- Born: 29 July 2000 (age 26)
- Batting: Right-handed
- Bowling: Right-arm medium-fast
- Role: All-rounder

International information
- National side: Malaysia
- T20I debut (cap 1): 3 June 2018 v India
- Last T20I: 28 May 2026 v Hong Kong
Medal record
Representing Malaysia
Women's Cricket
Southeast Asian Games
| Bronze medal – third place | 2017 Kuala Lumpur | Twenty20 |
- Source: ESPNcricinfo, 8 October 2024

Ainna Hamizah Hashim (born 29 July 2000) is a Malaysian cricketer. She made her Women's Twenty20 International (WT20I) debut for Malaysia against India on 3 June 2018, in the 2018 Women's Twenty20 Asia Cup. In April 2021, she was one of 15 players to be awarded a contract by the Malaysian Cricket Association, the first time female cricketers for the Malaysian team had been granted contracts.

== Career ==
In November 2021, she was named in Malaysia's side for the 2021 ICC Women's T20 World Cup Asia Qualifier tournament in the United Arab Emirates.

In October 2022, she played for Malaysia in Women's Twenty20 Asia Cup. She was a member of Malaysia's 2023 Asian Games squad.
