= Mas Elysa =

Malaysian cricketer (born 2001)

Personal information
- Full name: Mas Elysa Yasmin Zulkifli
- Born: 19 May 2001 (age 25); Hospital Sungai Siput, Perak
- Batting: Right-handed
- Bowling: Legbreak googly

International information
- National side: Malaysia
- T20I debut (cap 6): 3 June 2018 v India
- Last T20I: 18 February 2024 v United Arab Emirates
Medal record
Representing Malaysia
Women's Cricket
Southeast Asian Games
Bronze medal – third place	2017 Kuala Lumpur	Twenty20
- Source: ESPNCricinfo, 8 October 2024

Mas Elysa Yasmin Zulkifli (born 19 May 2001) is a Malaysian cricketer. She made her Women's Twenty20 International (WT20I) debut for Malaysia on 3 June 2018, in the 2018 Women's Twenty20 Asia Cup.

She once held the record for the best bowling figures in a Twenty20 International, by taking 6/3 from 4.0 overs against China at the Thailand Women's T20 Smash on 16 January 2019 at Asian Institute of Technology Ground in Bangkok. Her feat was reported in Malaysia newspapers, unusually for women's cricket in the country. In April 2021, she was one of 15 players to be awarded a contract by the Malaysian Cricket Association, the first time female cricketers for the Malaysian team had been granted contracts.

In November 2021, she was named on Malaysia's side for the 2021 ICC Women's T20 World Cup Asia Qualifier tournament in the United Arab Emirates. In October 2022, she played for Malaysia in the Women's Twenty20 Asia Cup. In September 2023, she was selected in Malaysia's 2023 Asian Games squad.
