= Nannapat Koncharoenkai =

Thai cricketer (born 2000)

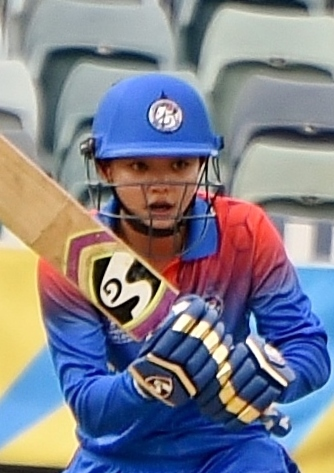
- Koncharoenkai batting for Thailand during the 2020 ICC Women's T20 World Cup

Personal information
- Born: 11 September 2000 (age 26); Lampang, Thailand
- Batting: Right-handed
- Role: Wicket-keeper

International information
- National side: Thailand
- ODI debut (cap 6): 20 November 2022 v Netherlands
- Last ODI: 7 July 2023 v Netherlands
- T20I debut (cap 4): 3 June 2018 v Pakistan
- Last T20I: 24 July 2022 v Sri Lanka
Medal record
Representing Thailand
Women's Cricket
Southeast Asian Games
Gold medal – first place	2017 Kuala Lumpur	Twenty20
Gold medal – first place	2023 Cambodia	Twenty10
Gold medal – first place	2023 Cambodia	Twenty20
Gold medal – first place	2023 Cambodia	50 overs
- Source: Cricinfo, 8 October 2024

Nannapat Koncharoenkai (Thai:นันท์นภัส คนเจริญไกร, born 11 September 2000) is a Thai cricketer.

== Career ==
Koncharoenkai played for the Thailand women's national cricket team in the 2017 Women's Cricket World Cup Qualifier in February 2017. She made her Women's Twenty20 International (WT20I) debut for Thailand on 3 June 2018, in the 2018 Women's Twenty20 Asia Cup. Following the conclusion of the tournament, she was named as the rising star of Thailand's squad by the International Cricket Council (ICC).

In November 2018, she was named in the Women's Global Development Squad, to play fixtures against Women's Big Bash League (WBBL) clubs. In August 2019, she was named in Thailand's squad for the 2019 ICC Women's World Twenty20 Qualifier tournament in Scotland.

In January 2020, Koncharoenkai was named in Thailand's squad for the 2020 ICC Women's T20 World Cup in Australia. In Thailand's first match of the tournament, against the West Indies at the WACA Ground in Perth, she anchored her team's innings with 33 runs from 48 balls, in a contest in which Thailand gave its opponents a scare before going down by seven wickets.

In November 2021, she was named as the vice-captain of Thailand's team for the 2021 Women's Cricket World Cup Qualifier tournament in Zimbabwe. She played in Thailand's first match of the tournament, on 21 November 2021 against Zimbabwe.

In October 2022, she played for Thailand in Women's Twenty20 Asia Cup. She also appeared in 2024 Women's Twenty20 Asia Cup

Koncharoenkai was part of the Thailand squad for the 2025 Women's Cricket World Cup Qualifier in Pakistan in April 2025.
