= Sornnarin Tippoch =

Thai cricketer (born 1986)

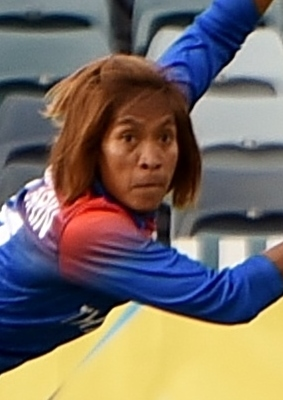
- Tippoch batting for Thailand during the 2020 ICC Women's T20 World Cup

Personal information
- Born: 7 June 1986 (age 40); Buriram, Thailand
- Nickname: Noi
- Batting: Left-handed
- Bowling: Right-arm off break
- Role: All-rounder

International information
- National side: Thailand (2018– 2023)
- ODI debut (cap 11): 20 November 2022 v Netherlands
- Last ODI: 7 July 2023 v Netherlands
- T20I debut (cap 11): 3 June 2018 v Pakistan
- Last T20I: 22 September 2023 v Sri Lanka

Career statistics
Competition	WODI	WT20I
Matches	9	75
Runs scored	89	344
Batting average	9.88	10.75
100s/50s	0/0	0/0
Top score	41	37*
Balls bowled	208	1,033
Wickets	5	51
Bowling average	20.00	13.62
5 wickets in innings	0	0
10 wickets in match	0	0
Best bowling	3/15	4/4
Catches/stumpings	4/–	28/–
Medal record
Representing Thailand
Women's Cricket
Southeast Asian Games
Gold medal – first place	2017 Kuala Lumpur	Twenty20
- Source: Cricinfo, 18 October 2023

Sornnarin Tippoch (Thai:ศรนรินทร์ ทิพย์โภชน์, born 7 June 1986) is a Thai former cricketer and captain of the national team.

== Career ==
Tippoch began playing cricket at the age of 21 after being scouted while playing softball at university. She captained Thailand in their first-ever international against Bangladesh in 2008.

She captained the Thailand women's cricket team in the 2017 Women's Cricket World Cup Qualifier in February 2017. In June 2018, she was named as the captain of Thailand for the 2018 ICC Women's World Twenty20 Qualifier tournament. She made her Women's Twenty20 International (WT20I) debut on 3 June 2018, in the 2018 Women's Twenty20 Asia Cup.

In February 2019, she was the joint-leading wicket-taker in the 2019 ICC Women's Qualifier Asia tournament, with thirteen dismissals in six matches.

In August 2019, she was named as the captain of Thailand's squad for the 2019 ICC Women's World Twenty20 Qualifier tournament in Scotland. In October 2019, she was named in the Women's Global Development Squad, ahead of a five-match series in Australia. In January 2020, she was named as the captain of Thailand's squad for the 2020 ICC Women's T20 World Cup in Australia.

In November 2020, Tippoch was nominated for the ICC Women's Associate Cricketer of the Decade award. In April 2021, the Cricket Association of Thailand announced that Naruemol Chaiwai would replace Tippoch as Thailand's captain across all formats. In November 2021, she was named in Thailand's team for the 2021 Women's Cricket World Cup Qualifier tournament in Zimbabwe. She played in Thailand's first match of the tournament, on 21 November 2021 against Zimbabwe.

In October 2022, she played for Thailand in Women's Twenty20 Asia Cup.

On 18 October 2023, she announced retirement from international cricket.
