= Naruemol Chaiwai =

Thai cricketer (born 1990)

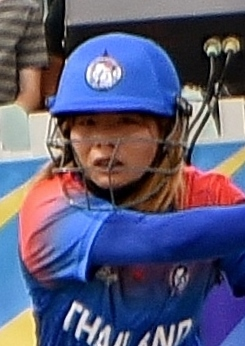
- Chaiwai batting for Thailand during the 2020 ICC Women's T20 World Cup

Personal information
- Born: 2 July 1990 (age 36); Chiang Mai, Thailand
- Batting: Right-handed
- Bowling: Right-arm medium
- Role: Batter

International information
- National side: Thailand
- ODI debut (cap 2): 20 November 2022 v Netherlands
- Last ODI: 19 April 2025 v West Indies
- T20I debut (cap 2): 3 June 2018 v Pakistan
- Last T20I: 27 May 2026 v Malaysia
Medal record
Representing Thailand
Women's Cricket
Southeast Asian Games
| Gold medal – first place | 2017 Kuala Lumpur | Twenty20 |
| Gold medal – first place | 2023 Cambodia | Twenty10 |
| Gold medal – first place | 2023 Cambodia | Twenty20 |
| Gold medal – first place | 2023 Cambodia | 50 overs |
- Source: Cricinfo, 8 October 2024

Naruemol Chaiwai (Thai: นฤมล ใจไว, born 2 July 1990) is a Thai cricketer. In April 2021, the Cricket Association of Thailand appointed her as the captain of the Thailand women's team, replacing Sornnarin Tippoch.

== Biography ==
Chaiwai played for the national cricket team in the 2017 Women's Cricket World Cup Qualifier in February 2017. She was the leading run-scorer for Thailand in the 2018 Women's Twenty20 Asia Cup, with 90 runs in five matches.

In June 2018, she was named in Thailand's squad for the 2018 ICC Women's World Twenty20 Qualifier tournament. She made her Women's Twenty20 International (WT20I) debut for Thailand on 3 June 2018, in the 2018 Women's Twenty20 Asia Cup. In February 2019, she was the leading run-scorer in the 2019 ICC Women's Qualifier Asia tournament, with 181 runs in six matches.

In August 2019, she was named in Thailand's squad for the 2019 ICC Women's World Twenty20 Qualifier tournament in Scotland. She was the leading run-scorer for Thailand in the tournament, with 87 runs in five matches. In October 2019, she was named in the Women's Global Development Squad, ahead of a five-match series in Australia. In January 2020, she was named in Thailand's squad for the 2020 ICC Women's T20 World Cup in Australia.

In November 2021, she was named as the captain of Thailand's team for the 2021 Women's Cricket World Cup Qualifier tournament in Zimbabwe. She played in Thailand's first match of the tournament, on 21 November 2021 against Zimbabwe.

In October 2022, she played for Thailand in Women's Twenty20 Asia Cup.

Chaiwai was captain of the Thailand squad for the 2025 Women's Cricket World Cup Qualifier in Pakistan in April 2025.
