= Nattaya Boochatham =

Thai cricketer (born 1986)

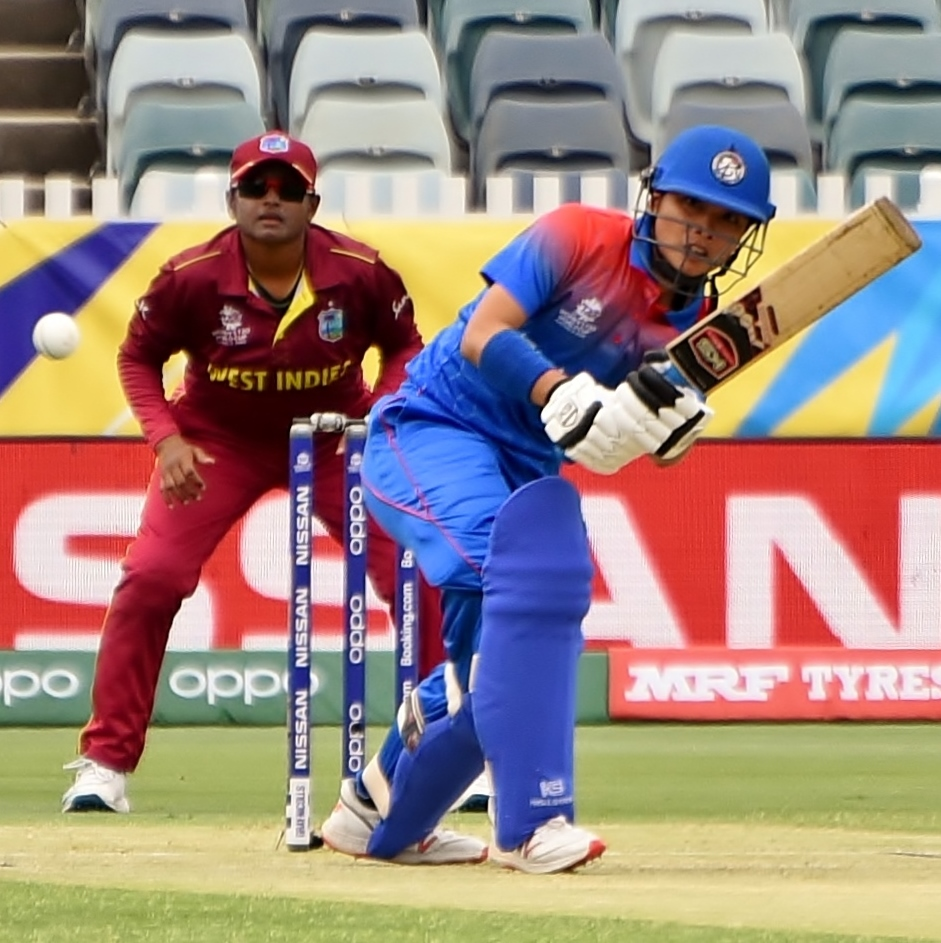
- Boochatham batting for Thailand during the 2020 ICC Women's T20 World Cup

Personal information
- Born: 3 December 1986 (age 39); Sisaket, Thailand
- Nickname: Fon
- Batting: Left-handed
- Bowling: Right-arm off break
- Role: All-rounder

International information
- National side: Thailand (2018–2025)
- ODI debut (cap 1): 20 November 2022 v Netherlands
- Last ODI: 19 April 2025 v West Indies
- T20I debut (cap 1): 3 June 2018 v Pakistan
- Last T20I: 19 December 2025 v Malaysia
Medal record
Representing Thailand
Women's Cricket
Southeast Asian Games
Gold medal – first place	2017 Kuala Lumpur	Twenty20
Gold medal – first place	2023 Cambodia	Twenty10
Gold medal – first place	2023 Cambodia	Twenty20
Gold medal – first place	2023 Cambodia	50 overs
- Source: Cricinfo, 8 October 2024

Nattaya Boochatham (Thai:นาตยา บูชาธรรม, born 3 December 1986) is a retired Thai international cricketer who has played for the Thailand women's national cricket team as an all-rounder.

== Career ==
Boochatham was a member of the Thailand team in the 2017 Women's Cricket World Cup Qualifier in February 2017. She was the highest run-scorer for Thailand in the tournament, with 116 runs.

In June 2018, she was named in Thailand's squad for the 2018 ICC Women's World Twenty20 Qualifier tournament. She made her Women's Twenty20 International (WT20I) debut for Thailand on 3 June 2018, in the 2018 Women's Twenty20 Asia Cup. She was the leading run-scorer for Thailand in the tournament, with 86 runs in five matches. She was also the joint-leading wicket-taker for Thailand in the tournament, with six dismissals in five matches.

In November 2018, she was named in the Women's Global Development Squad, to play fixtures against Women's Big Bash League (WBBL) clubs.

In August 2019, she finished the 2019 Netherlands Women's Quadrangular Series as the joint-leading wicket-taker, with nine dismissals from six matches. Later the same month, she was named in Thailand's squad for the 2019 ICC Women's World Twenty20 Qualifier tournament in Scotland. She took more WT20I wickets than any other player in 2019; a total of 40 at an average of 6.17 and an economy rate of 3.23.

In January 2020, Boochatham was named in Thailand's squad for the 2020 ICC Women's T20 World Cup in Australia. In Thailand's last match of the tournament, against Pakistan, she scored 44, and shared in an opening partnership of 93 with Natthakan Chantam.

In November 2021, she was named in Thailand's team for the 2021 Women's Cricket World Cup Qualifier tournament in Zimbabwe. She played in Thailand's first match of the tournament, on 21 November 2021 against Zimbabwe.

In October 2022, she played for Thailand in Women's Twenty20 Asia Cup.

In September 2023, during the 2023 ICC Women's T20 World Cup Asia Qualifier in Malaysia, Boochatham became the first player from an ICC associate member to take 100 wickets in Twenty20 Internationals.

She was part of the Thailand squad for the 2025 Women's Cricket World Cup Qualifier in Pakistan in April 2025.

In December 2025, Boochatham announced her retirement from international cricket after helping Thailand win a sixth gold medal in the women’s T20 final at the SEA Games 2025.
