= Aina Najwa =

Malaysian cricketer (born 1996)

Personal information
- Full name: Aina Najwa Abdul Rahman
- Born: 1 August 1996 (age 30)
- Batting: Right-handed
- Role: Wicket-keeper

International information
- National side: Malaysia
- T20I debut (cap 13): 7 June 2018 v Pakistan
- Last T20I: 24 July 2024 v Bangladesh
- Source: ESPNCricinfo, 8 October 2024

Aina Najwa (born 1 August 1996) is a Malaysian cricketer. She made her Women's Twenty20 International (WT20I) debut for Malaysia against Pakistan on 7 June 2018, in the 2018 Women's Twenty20 Asia Cup. In June 2022, she was selected in Malaysia's squad for 2022 ACC Women's T20 Championship. In October 2022, she played for Malaysia in Women's Twenty20 Asia Cup.
