= Suleeporn Laomi =

Thai cricketer (born 1998)

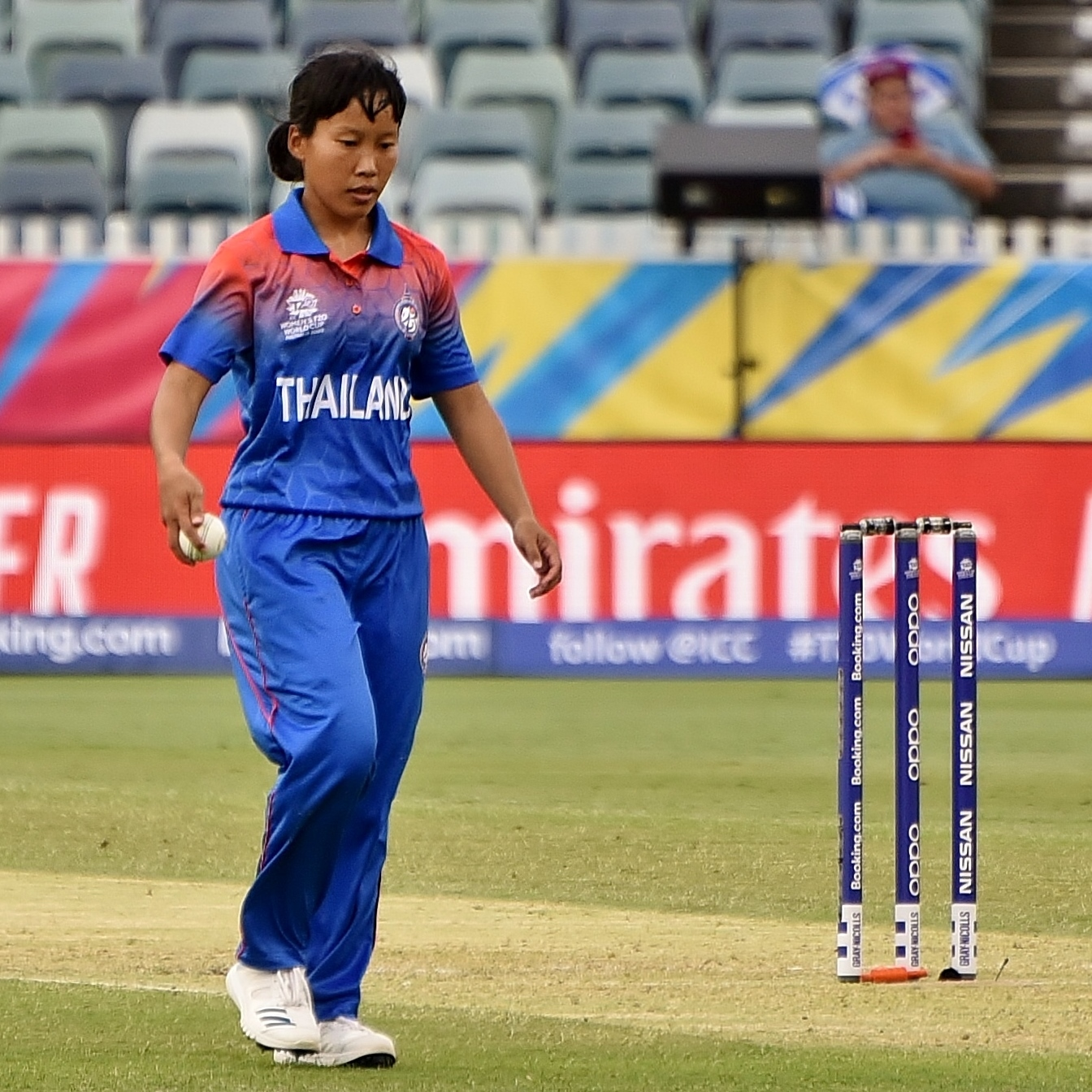
- Laomi playing for Thailand during the 2020 ICC Women's T20 World Cup

Personal information
- Born: 22 January 1998 (age 28); Chiang Mai, Thailand
- Batting: Right-handed
- Bowling: Legbreak
- Role: Bowler

International information
- National side: Thailand
- ODI debut (cap 7): 20 November 2022 v Netherlands
- Last ODI: 23 April 2022 v Zimbabwe
- T20I debut (cap 5): 3 June 2018 v Pakistan
- Last T20I: 24 July 2024 v Sri Lanka

Career statistics
Competition	T20I	WODI
Matches	66	7
Runs scored	94	61
Batting average	7.23	12.20
100s/50s	0/0	0/0
Top score	17	22
Balls bowled	1,230	288
Wickets	64	14
Bowling average	13.85	12.28
5 wickets in innings	0	0
10 wickets in match	0	0
Best bowling	4/9	4/26
Catches/stumpings	11/–	23/–
Medal record
Representing Thailand
Women's Cricket
Southeast Asian Games
Gold medal – first place	2017 Kuala Lumpur	Twenty20
Gold medal – first place	2023 Cambodia	Twenty10
Gold medal – first place	2023 Cambodia	Twenty20
Gold medal – first place	2023 Cambodia	50 overs
- Source: Cricinfo, 8 October 2024

Suleeporn Laomi (Thai:ศุลีพร เลาหมี่, born 22 January 1998) is a Thai cricketer, who plays for the women's national cricket team.

== Career ==
Laomi played for the national team in the 2017 Women's Cricket World Cup Qualifier in February 2017. In the tournament, she was the highest wicket-taker for Thailand, with 4 dismissals.

In June 2018, she was named in Thailand's squad for the 2018 ICC Women's World Twenty20 Qualifier tournament. She made her Women's Twenty20 International (WT20I) debut for Thailand on 3 June 2018, in the 2018 Women's Twenty20 Asia Cup.

In August 2019, she was named in Thailand's squad for the 2019 ICC Women's World Twenty20 Qualifier tournament in Scotland. In October 2019, she was named in the Women's Global Development Squad, ahead of a five-match series in Australia. In January 2020, she was named in Thailand's squad for the 2020 ICC Women's T20 World Cup in Australia. In November 2021, she was named in Thailand's team for the 2021 Women's Cricket World Cup Qualifier tournament in Zimbabwe. She played in Thailand's first match of the tournament, on 21 November 2021 against Zimbabwe.

In October 2022, she played for Thailand in Women's Twenty20 Asia Cup.

Laomi was part of the Thailand squad for the 2025 Women's Cricket World Cup Qualifier in Pakistan in April 2025.
