= Malaysian Cricket Association =

Official governing body of the sport of cricket in Malaysia

- Sport: Cricket
- Jurisdiction: National
- Affiliation: International Cricket Council (ICC)
- (Malaysia)

The Malaysian Cricket Association (Malay: Persatuan Kriket Malaysia) is the official governing body for cricket in Malaysia. Its current headquarters is in Kuala Lumpur, Malaysia. The Malaysian Cricket Association is Malaysia's representative at the International Cricket Council, having been an associate member the ICC since 1967. It is also a member of the Asian Cricket Council.

== See also ==
- Malaysia national cricket team
