= Cricket at the 2017 SEA Games – Women's twenty20 tournament =

Women's Twenty20 tournament at the 2017 SEA Games
- Dates: 22 August 2017 – 28 August 2017
- Administrator: Southeast Asian Games Federation
- Cricket format: Women Twenty20
- Tournament format(s): Round-robin and play-offs
- Host(s): Kinrara Oval; Selangor, Malaysia
- Champions: Thailand
- Participants: 4
- Matches: 8
- Most runs: (Indonesia) Andriani (132)
- Most wickets: (Thailand) Wongpaka Liengprasert (13)

The women's Twenty20 cricket tournament at the 2017 SEA Games took place at Kinrara Oval in Selangor, Malaysia, from 22 to 28 August 2017. The competition was held in a round-robin format where each competitor team played three matches, followed by 2 play-offs: The 1st team on the points table against the 2nd for gold medal and the 3rd team against the 4th for bronze medal.

== Competition schedule ==
The following was the competition schedule for the women's Twenty20 competitions:

RR	Round-robin	B	3rd place play-off	F	Final

Tue 22	Wed 23	Thu 24	Fri 25	Sat 26	Sun 27	Mon 28	
RR	RR	RR	RR	RR	RR	B	F

== Results ==
All times are Malaysia Standard Time (UTC+08:00)

=== Round-robin ===
Pos	Team	Pld	W	L	T	NR	NRR	Pts	Final result
1	Thailand	3	3	0	0	0	+5.788	6	Final
2	Indonesia	3	2	1	0	0	–0.867	4	Final
3	Malaysia	3	1	2	0	0	–0.356	2	3rd place play-off
4	Singapore	3	0	3	0	0	–4.623	0	3rd place play-off

Source: ESPNCricInfo

22 August
10:00
Scorecard

Thailand; 159/5 (20 overs)	v	Indonesia; 45 (18.2 overs)
Sirintra Saengsakaorat 62 (56); Puji Haryanti 2/6 (1 over)		Ni Sariani 9 (31); Wongpaka Liengprasert 3/8 (2.2 overs)

Thailand won by 114 runs
Kinrara Academy Oval, Selangor
Umpires: Viswanadan Kalidas (Mas) and Shafizan Shahriman (Mas)

- Thailand won the toss and elected to bat.

23 August
08:30
Scorecard

Singapore; 55/6 (20 overs)	v	Malaysia; 58/1 (7.3 overs)
Vathana Sreemurugavel 13 (43); Zumika Azmi 2/12 (3 overs)		Winifred Duraisingam 25* (15); Diviya G K 1/23 (3.3 overs)

Malaysia won by 9 wickets
Kinrara Academy Oval, Selangor
Umpires: Buddhi Pradhan (Nep) and Durga Subedi (Nep)

- Malaysia won the toss and elected to field.

24 August
10:00
Scorecard

Indonesia; 140/2 (20 overs)	v	Singapore; 99/7 (20 overs)
Andriani 53* (37); Roshni Ramesh 1/26 (3 overs)		Diviya G K 37 (39); Andriani 2/18 (4 overs)

Indonesia won by 41 runs
Kinrara Academy Oval, Selangor
Umpires: Viswanadan Kalidas (Mas) and Batumalai Ramani (Mas)

- Singapore won the toss and elected to field.

25 August
15:00
Scorecard

Malaysia; 48 (16.1 overs)	v	Thailand; 49/3 (8 overs)
Winifred Duraisingam 23* (38); Suleeporn Laomi 4/8 (4 overs)		Natthakan Chantam 23 (13); Jannadiah Halim 2/7 (2 overs)

Thailand won by 7 wickets
Kinrara Academy Oval, Selangor
Umpires: Buddhi Pradhan (Nep) and Durga Subedi (Nep)

- Thailand won the toss and elected to field.
- Thailand qualified to gold medal final as a result of this match.
- Singapore was eliminated to 3rd place play-off as a result of this match.

26 August
12:30
Scorecard

Thailand; 162/5 (19 overs)	v	Singapore; 30 (16.2 overs)
Sirintra Saengsakaorat 54* (56); Diviya G K 1/27 (4 overs)		Samantha Singham 8 (33); Wongpaka Liengprasert 4/8 (3.2 overs)

Thailand won by 132 runs
Kinrara Academy Oval, Selangor
Umpires: Loganathan Poobalan (Mas) and Narayanan Sivan (Mas)

- Thailand won the toss and elected to bat.
- Match was shortened to 19 overs per side.

27 August
09:00
Scorecard

Indonesia; 97/2 (20 overs)	v	Malaysia; 76/9 (20 overs)
Yulia Anggraeni 48 (65); Jannadiah Halim 1/10 (4 overs)		Zumika Azmi 15 (31); Ni Sariani 2/12 (4 overs)

Indonesia won by 21 runs
Kinrara Academy Oval, Selangor
Umpires: Buddhi Pradhan (Nep) and Durga Subedi (Nep)

- Indonesia won the toss and elected to bat.
- Indonesia qualified to gold medal final as a result of this match.
- Malaysia was eliminated to 3rd place play-off as a result of this match.

=== Play-offs ===
==== 3rd place play-off ====
28 August
09:00
Scorecard

Singapore; 50 (19.4 overs)	v	Malaysia; 52/2 (9.5 overs)
Diviya G K 13 (51); Jannadiah Halim 3/3 (4 overs)		Christina Baret 22* (28); Smruthi Radhakrisnan 1/15 (2.5 overs)

Malaysia won by 8 wickets
Kinrara Academy Oval, Selangor
Umpires: Buddhi Pradhan (Nep) and Durga Subedi (Nep)

- Singapore won the toss and elected to bat.

==== Final ====
28 August
12:30
Scorecard

Thailand; 109/7 (20 overs)	v	Indonesia; 86 (18.4 overs)
Sornnarin Tippoch 23 (22); Ni Rada Rani 2/8 (4 overs)		Andriani 46 (46); Wongpaka Liengprasert 4/16 (2.4 overs)

Thailand won by 23 runs
Kinrara Academy Oval, Selangor
Umpires: Batumalai Ramani (Mas) and Zaidan Taha (Mas)

- Thailand won the toss and elected to bat.
