= 2011 ACC Women's Twenty20 Championship =

- Dates: 18 – 25 February 2011
- Administrator: Asian Cricket Council
- Cricket format: 20-over
- Tournament format(s): Group stage, playoffs
- Host: Kuwait
- Champions: Hong Kong (2nd title)
- Participants: 10
- Matches: 27
- Most runs: (Hong Kong) Neisha Pratt (220)
- Most wickets: (Nepal) Karuna Bhandari (14)

The 2011 ACC Women's Twenty20 Championship was an international women's cricket tournament held in Kuwait from 18 to 25 February 2011. It was organised by the Asian Cricket Council (ACC).

Ten teams participated in the tournament, down from twelve at the previous edition in 2009. Iran and Qatar were the teams that did not return. The ten teams were divided into groups of five, one of which was topped by China and the other by Nepal. China defeated Thailand in the first semi-final, but Nepal were defeated by Hong Kong in the other. Hong Kong went on to also defeat China in the final, winning their second consecutive title.

The Afghanistan women's national cricket team was scheduled to make its debut at the tournament, but was forced to withdraw before travelling to Kuwait due to elements in Afghanistan opposing women's participation in sport.

== Group stages ==
=== Group A ===
Team	Pld	W	L	NR	Pts	NRR
China	4	4	0	0	8	+3.518
Hong Kong	4	3	1	0	6	+4.634
Singapore	4	2	2	0	4	–1.233
Bhutan	4	1	3	0	2	–2.191
Oman	4	0	4	0	0	–5.638
Source: CricketArchive

18 February
Scorecard

Bhutan; 61 (14.1 overs)	v	Singapore; 62/0 (7.3 overs)

Singapore won by 10 wickets
Entertainment City, Kuwait City
Player of the match: Diviya G K (Sin)

18 February
Scorecard

China; 129/4 (20 overs)	v	Hong Kong; 116/7 (20 overs)

China won by 13 runs
Kuwait Oil Company Hubara Ground, Kuwait City
Player of the match: Zhang Mei (Chi)

19 February
Scorecard

Bhutan; 42/7 (20 overs)	v	China; 43/5 (6.4 overs)

China won by 5 wickets
Entertainment City, Kuwait City
Player of the match: Yu Miao (Chi)

19 February
Scorecard

Hong Kong; 178/0 (20 overs)	v	Oman; 45/5 (20 overs)

Hong Kong won by 133 runs
Kuwait Oil Company Hubara Ground, Kuwait City
Player of the match: Neisha Pratt (HK)

20 February
Scorecard

Bhutan; 32 (18.5 overs)	v	Hong Kong; 36/1 (4 overs)

Hong Kong won by 9 wickets
Kuwait Oil Company Hubara Ground, Kuwait City
Player of the match: Keenu Gill (HK)

20 February
Scorecard

Oman; 44 (19 overs)	v	Singapore; 46/0 (5 overs)

Singapore won by 10 wickets
Kuwait Oil Company Hubara Ground, Kuwait City
Player of the match: Vritti Sethi (Sin)

21 February
Scorecard

Oman; 36/7 (20 overs)	v	China; 37/0 (3.4 overs)

China won by 10 wickets
Entertainment City, Kuwait City
Player of the match: Wang Meng (Chi)

21 February
Scorecard

Hong Kong; 145/3 (20 overs)	v	Singapore; 17 (15.1 overs)

Hong Kong won by 128 runs
Kuwait Oil Company Hubara Ground, Kuwait City
Player of the match: Connie Wong (HK)

23 February
Scorecard

Bhutan; 132/5 (20 overs)	v	Oman; 70/9 (20 overs)

Bhutan won by 62 runs
Kuwait Oil Company Hubara Ground, Kuwait City
Player of the match: Dechen Wangmo (Bhu)

23 February
Scorecard

China; 126/4 (20 overs)	v	Singapore; 57/7 (20 overs)

China won by 69 runs
Kuwait Oil Company Hubara Ground, Kuwait City
Player of the match: Yu Miao (Chi)

=== Group B ===
Team	Pld	W	L	NR	Pts	NRR
Nepal	4	4	0	0	8	+1.808
Thailand	4	3	1	0	6	+1.563
Malaysia	4	1	3	0	2	–0.575
Kuwait	4	1	3	0	2	–1.112
United Arab Emirates	4	1	3	0	2	–2.556
Source: CricketArchive

18 February
Scorecard

Malaysia; 85 (18.3 overs)	v	Kuwait; 86/4 (14.4 overs)

Kuwait won by 6 wickets
Kuwait Oil Company Hubara Ground, Kuwait City
Player of the match: Anisha D'Silva (Kuw)

18 February
Scorecard

Nepal; 75 (18.4 overs)	v	Thailand; 54 (18.1 overs)

Nepal won by 21 runs
Entertainment City, Kuwait City
Player of the match: Janaki Bhatt (Nep)

19 February
Scorecard

Malaysia; 93/8 (20 overs)	v	Thailand; 94/0 (12.5 overs)

Thailand won by 10 wickets
Kuwait Oil Company Hubara Ground, Kuwait City
Player of the match: Pundarika Prathanmir (Tha)

19 February
Scorecard

UAE; 80/6 (20 overs)	v	Nepal; 81/2 (9.1 overs)

Nepal won by 8 wickets
Entertainment City, Kuwait City
Player of the match: Rashmi Sharma (Nep)

20 February
Scorecard

Nepal; 103/4 (20 overs)	v	Kuwait; 56/9 (20 overs)

Nepal won by 47 runs
Entertainment City, Kuwait City
Player of the match: Karuna Bhandari (Nep)

20 February
Scorecard

UAE; 89/9 (20 overs)	v	Thailand; 90/4 (11 overs)

Thailand won by 6 wickets
Entertainment City, Kuwait City
Player of the match: Nattaya Boochatham (Tha)

21 February
Scorecard

UAE; 82/3 (20 overs)	v	Kuwait; 77 (14.1 overs)

UAE won by 5 runs
Entertainment City, Kuwait City
Player of the match: Charvi Bhatt (UAE)

21 February
Scorecard

Malaysia; 68/7 (20 overs)	v	Nepal; 69/1 (16 overs)

Nepal won by 9 wickets
Kuwait Oil Company Hubara Ground, Kuwait City
Player of the match: Rubina Chhetry (Nep)

23 February
Scorecard

UAE; 67/8 (20 overs)	v	Malaysia; 68/2 (11.2 overs)

Malaysia won by 8 wickets
Entertainment City, Kuwait City
Player of the match: Emylia Rahim (Mal)

23 February
Scorecard

Kuwait; 47/7 (20 overs)	v	Thailand; 48/2 (9.3 overs)

Thailand won by 8 wickets
Entertainment City, Kuwait City
Player of the match: Nattaya Boochatham (Tha)

== Knockouts ==
=== Semi-finals ===
24 February
Scorecard

China; 109/6 (20 overs)	v	Thailand; 56/9 (20 overs)

China won by 53 runs
Kuwait Oil Company Hubara Ground, Kuwait City
Player of the match: Wang Meng (Chi)

24 February
Scorecard

Nepal; 96/2 (20 overs)	v	Hong Kong; 97/1 (16.5 overs)

Hong Kong won by 9 wickets
Entertainment City, Kuwait City
Player of the match: Connie Wong (HK)

=== Final ===
25 February
Scorecard

China; 107/4 (20 overs)	v	Hong Kong; 108/7 (19.3 overs)

Hong Kong won by 3 wickets
Entertainment City, Kuwait City
Player of the match: Neisha Pratt (HK)

== Placement matches ==
=== 3rd-place play-off ===
25 February
Scorecard

Thailand; 76 (17.5 overs)	v	Nepal; 63 (18.5 overs)

Thailand won by 13 runs
Entertainment City, Kuwait City
Player of the match: Nantanit Konchan (Tha)

=== 5th-place play-off ===
24 February
Scorecard

Singapore; 118/4 (20 overs)	v	Malaysia; 119/9 (19.1 overs)

Malaysia won by 1 wicket
Kuwait Oil Company Hubara Ground, Kuwait City
Player of the match: Norlida Hamid (Mal)

=== 7th-place play-off ===
24 February
Scorecard

Bhutan; 56 (17.3 overs)	v	Kuwait; 57/5 (11.1 overs)

Kuwait won by 5 wickets
Entertainment City, Kuwait City
Player of the match: Khansa Irfan (Kuw)

=== 9th-place play-off ===
24 February
Scorecard

UAE; 110/6 (20 overs)	v	Oman; 75/9 (20 overs)

UAE won by 35 runs
Entertainment City, Kuwait City
Player of the match: Shruti Pandey (UAE)

== Statistics ==
=== Most runs ===
The top five runscorers are included in this table, ranked by runs scored and then by batting average.

Player	Team	Runs	Inns	Avg	Highest	100s	50s
Neisha Pratt	Hong Kong	220	5	73.33	88*	0	2
Shruti Pandey	United Arab Emirates	136	5	68.00	42	0	0
Keenu Gill	Hong Kong	134	6	26.80	58*	0	1
Connie Wong	Hong Kong	133	5	66.50	60*	0	1
Huang Zhou	China	120	5	40.00	40*	0	0

Source: CricketArchive

=== Most wickets ===
The top five wicket-takers are listed in this table, ranked by wickets taken and then by bowling average.

Player	Team	Overs	Wkts	Ave	SR	Econ	BBI
Karuna Bhandari	Nepal	20.5	14	4.85	8.92	3.26	5/12
Vigineswari Pasupathy	Singapore	19.0	10	10.00	11.40	5.26	4/21
Nathakan Chantham	Thailand	22.3	9	11.44	15.00	4.57	2/17
Chan Sau Har	Hong Kong	18.0	8	8.37	13.50	3.72	5/3
Wang Meng	China	23.0	7	8.85	19.71	2.69	3/2

Source: CricketArchive

== Final standing ==
Rank	Team
1	Hong Kong
2	China
3	Thailand
4	Nepal
5	Malaysia
6	Singapore
7	Kuwait
8	Bhutan
9	United Arab Emirates
10	Oman
