= 2022 ACC Women's T20 Championship =

International cricket tournament

- Dates: 17 – 25 June 2022
- Administrator: Asian Cricket Council
- Cricket format: Twenty20 International
- Tournament format(s): Group round-robin and knockouts
- Host: Malaysia
- Champions: United Arab Emirates (1st title)
- Runners-up: Malaysia
- Participants: 10
- Matches: 23
- Player of the series: (United Arab Emirates) Theertha Satish
- Most runs: (United Arab Emirates) Esha Oza (192)
- Most wickets: (Nepal) Asmina Karmacharya (8) (Hong Kong) Maryam Bibi (8)

The 2022 ACC Women's T20 Championship was a women's Twenty20 International (WT20I) cricket tournament that was held in Malaysia from 17 to 25 June 2022. The tournament was organised by the Asian Cricket Council (ACC) and the top two sides qualified for the 2022 Women's Twenty20 Asia Cup. The series was the last to be played at the Kinrara Academy Oval before the ground closed on 30 June 2022.

The tournament was contested by 10 teams, including the hosts Malaysia, as well as Bahrain, Bhutan, Hong Kong, Kuwait, Nepal, Oman, Qatar, Singapore and United Arab Emirates. The ACC Women's Championship was last contested in 2013.

The tournament began with comfortable victories for Nepal and Malaysia, before both afternoon matches were abandoned after rain stopped play. Following the conclusion of the group stage, the UAE, Hong Kong, Malaysia and Nepal had all reached the semi-finals of the tournament. The first semi-final finished in a no result due to rain, with the UAE progressing to the tournament's final because of their superior net run rate in the group stage. The second semi-final was also impacted by the weather, with Malaysia winning their reduced match against Hong Kong by 12 runs. In the final, the UAE beat Malaysia by five wickets to win the tournament, with both teams qualifying for the 2022 Women's Twenty20 Asia Cup. The final was the last game to be played at the Kinrara Oval before the ground closed its door five days later.

== Squads ==
| Bahrain | Bhutan | Hong Kong | Kuwait | Malaysia |
|---|---|---|---|---|
| Deepika Rasangika (c); Tharanga Gajanayake (vc); Vilcita Barboza; Deepika Bhaskara; Gayani Fernando; Rasika Hathadurage (wk); Poorvaja Jagdeesha; Prajna Jagdeesha; Sachini Jayasinghe; Shashikala Prakash; Rasika Rodrigo; Pavithra Shetty; Ishara Suhun; Abeera Waris | Dechen Wangmo (c); Tashi Cheki; Ngawang Choden (wk); Sonam Choden; Yeshey Choden; Karma Dema; Anju Gurung; Tashi Lhaden; Pema Seldon (wk); Sonam; Sangay Wangmo; Eva Yangzom; Dechen Zangmo; Tshering Zangmo | Kary Chan (c); Yasmin Daswani (vc, wk); Maryam Bibi; Betty Chan; Hiu Ying Cheung (wk); Mariko Hill; Elysa Hubbard; Emma Lai; Natasha Miles; Bella Poon; Iqra Sahar; Shanzeen Shahzad (wk); Alison Siu; Ruchitha Venkatesh | Amna Tariq (c); Maryyam Ashraf (wk); Aakriti Bose (wk); Venora D'Souza; Siobhan Gomez; Mariamma Hyder; Maria Jasvi; Zeefa Jilani; Khadija Khalil; Mofida Kocchargi; Glenda Menes; Priyada Murali; Maryam Omar; Balasubramani Shanti | Winifred Duraisingam (c); Mas Elysa (vc); Nik Nur Atiela; Sasha Azmi; Aisya Eleesa; Ainna Hamizah Hashim; Elsa Hunter; Jamahidaya Intan; Wan Julia (wk); Dhanusri Muhunan; Aina Najwa (wk); Nur Arianna Natsya; Nur Dania Syuhada; Yusrina Yaakop |
| Nepal | Oman | Qatar | Singapore | United Arab Emirates |
| Rubina Chhetry (c); Indu Barma (vc); Apsari Begam; Dolly Bhatta; Mamta Chaudhary; Kabita Joshi; Asmina Karmacharya; Kabita Kunwar; Sita Rana Magar; Jyoti Pandey (wk); Sabnam Rai; Sangita Rai; Bindu Rawal; Kajal Shrestha (wk); Manisha Upadhayay | Vaishali Jesrani (c); Fiza Javed (vc); Afida Afthab; Nayan Anil; Saya Channa; Amanda Dcosta; Nikitha Jagdish; Sameera Khan; Priyanka Mendonca; Sushanthika Sathiya; Alifiya Sayed; Bhakti Shetty; Sakshi Shetty (wk); Sani Zehra | Aysha (c); Hiral Agarwal; Sarrinah Ahmed; Raiha Arshad; Shahreen Bahadur; Saachi Dhadwal; Rizpha Bano Emmanuel (wk); Khadija Imtiaz; Trupti Kale (wk); Aleena Khan; Hiya Ladani; Angeline Mare; Rochelle Quyn; Shrutiben Rana | Shafina Mahesh (c, wk); Chathurani Abeyratne; Ada Bhasin; Riyaa Bhasin; Diviya G K; Piumi Gurusinghe (wk); Vinu Kumar; Vigineswari Pasupathy; Jocelyn Pooranakaran; Johanna Pooranakaran; Damini Ramesh; Ishita Shukla; Zay Hua Tan; Ananyapriya Venkata | Chaya Mughal (c); Samaira Dharnidharka; Kavisha Egodage; Siya Gokhale; Priyanjali Jain (wk); Lavanya Keny; Suraksha Kotte; Vaishnave Mahesh; Indhuja Nandakumar; Esha Oza; Rithika Rajith; Theertha Satish (wk); Khushi Sharma; Sanchin Singh (wk) |

== Group stage ==
=== Group A ===
| Pos | Team | Pld | W | L | NR | Pts | NRR |
|---|---|---|---|---|---|---|---|
| 1 | United Arab Emirates | 4 | 3 | 0 | 1 | 7 | 5.713 |
| 2 | Malaysia | 4 | 3 | 1 | 0 | 6 | 2.383 |
| 3 | Qatar | 4 | 2 | 2 | 0 | 4 | −1.419 |
| 4 | Singapore | 4 | 1 | 3 | 0 | 2 | −3.777 |
| 5 | Oman | 4 | 0 | 3 | 1 | 1 | −2.058 |

Source: ESPN Cricinfo

Advanced to the semi-finals

17 June 2022
11:00
Scorecard

| Malaysia; 171/4 (20 overs) | v | Singapore; 54 (17.4 overs) |
| Mas Elysa 59 (39); Ada Bhasin 2/39 (4 overs) | | Vigineswari Pasupathy 10 (22); Nik Nur Atiela 2/2 (2 overs) |

Malaysia won by 117 runs
Kinrara Academy Oval, Kuala Lumpur
Umpires: Samad Akbar (Tha) and Durga Subedi (Nep)
Player of the match: Mas Elysa (Mas)

- Malaysia won the toss and elected to bat.
- Chathurani Abeyratne, Ada Bhasin, Vinu Kumar, Johanna Pooranakaran, Damini Ramesh and Zay Hua Tan (Sin) all made their WT20I debuts.

17 June 2022
15:00
Scorecard

| Oman; 26/3 (8.4 overs) | v | United Arab Emirates |
| Fiza Javed 9 (24); Esha Oza 1/2 (0.4 overs) |

No result
UKM-YSD Cricket Oval, Bangi
Umpires: Loganathan Poobalan (Mas) and Narayanan Sivan (Mas)

- Oman won the toss and elected to bat.
- No further play was possible due to rain.
- Alifiya Sayed (Oma) made her WT20I debut.

18 June 2022
11:00
Scorecard

| Singapore; 29 (17.2 overs) | v | United Arab Emirates; 33/0 (2.3 overs) |
| Shafina Mahesh 9 (16); Esha Oza 3/6 (4 overs) | | Esha Oza 29* (14) |

United Arab Emirates won by 10 wickets
Kinrara Academy Oval, Kuala Lumpur
Umpires: Viswanadan Kalidas (Mas) and Narayanan Sivan (Mas)
Player of the match: Esha Oza (UAE)

- United Arab Emirates won the toss and elected to field.
- Riyaa Bhasin (Sin) made her WT20I debut.

18 June 2022
15:00
Scorecard

| Qatar; 69 (19.4 overs) | v | Malaysia; 71/0 (12.3 overs) |
| Aysha 33* (47); Nur Dania Syuhada 2/9 (4 overs) | | Wan Julia 31* (38) |

Malaysia won by 10 wickets
UKM-YSD Cricket Oval, Bangi
Umpires: Anand Natarajan (Sin) and Durga Subedi (Nep)
Player of the match: Winifred Duraisingam (Mas)

- Malaysia won the toss and elected to field.

19 June 2022
10:30
Scorecard

| Oman; 48 (13 overs) | v | Qatar; 49/3 (8.5 overs) |
| Bhakti Shetty 22 (33); Hiral Agarwal 3/1 (2 overs) | | Shrutiben Rana 11 (20); Amanda Dcosta 1/10 (1.5 overs) |

Qatar won by 7 wickets
UKM-YSD Cricket Oval, Bangi
Umpires: Tabarak Dar (HK) and Narayanan Sivan (Mas)
Player of the match: Angeline Mare (Qat)

- Qatar won the toss and elected to field.

20 June 2022
10:30
Scorecard

| United Arab Emirates; 134/1 (20 overs) | v | Malaysia; 103/8 (20 overs) |
| Theertha Satish 52* (56); Mas Elysa 1/18 (2 overs) | | Mas Elysa 34 (31); Indhuja Nandakumar 4/10 (4 overs) |

United Arab Emirates won by 31 runs
UKM-YSD Cricket Oval, Bangi
Umpires: Anand Natarajan (Sin) and Sarika Prasad (Sin)
Player of the match: Indhuja Nandakumar (UAE)

- Malaysia won the toss and elected to field.

20 June 2022
14:15
Scorecard

| Oman; 109/6 (20 overs) | v | Singapore; 110/5 (19.5 overs) |
| Priyanka Mendonca 48* (39); Vinu Kumar 2/20 (4 overs) | | Vinu Kumar 38 (45); Priyanka Mendonca 2/15 (4 overs) |

Singapore won by 5 wickets
Kinrara Academy Oval, Kuala Lumpur
Umpires: Samad Akbar (Tha) and Loganathan Poobalan (Mas)
Player of the match: Vinu Kumar (Sin)

- Singapore won the toss and elected to field.
- Jocelyn Pooranakaran (Sin) made her WT20I debut.

21 June 2022
10:30
Scorecard

| Singapore; 46 (14.3 overs) | v | Qatar; 47/5 (10.3 overs) |
| Vinu Kumar 7 (8); Angeline Mare 3/12 (4 overs) | | Saachi Dhadwal 14* (20); Shafina Mahesh 2/21 (4 overs) |

Qatar won by 5 wickets
UKM-YSD Cricket Oval, Bangi
Umpires: Tabarak Dar (HK) and Durga Subedi (Nep)
Player of the match: Angeline Mare (Qat)

- Qatar won the toss and elected to field.
- Ananyapriya Venkata (Sin) made her WT20I debut.

22 June 2022
10:30
Scorecard

| Malaysia; 135/4 (20 overs) | v | Oman; 82/6 (20 overs) |
| Winifred Duraisingam 73 (68); Amanda Dcosta 2/19 (4 overs) | | Priyanka Mendonca 45* (48); Nur Dania Syuhada 1/8 (4 overs) |

Malaysia won by 53 runs
Kinrara Academy Oval, Kuala Lumpur
Umpires: Samad Akbar (Tha) and Anand Natarajan (Sin)
Player of the match: Winifred Duraisingam (Mas)

- Oman won the toss and elected to field.

22 June 2022
14:15
Scorecard

| United Arab Emirates; 214/1 (20 overs) | v | Qatar; 61/7 (20 overs) |
| Esha Oza 115 (67); Saachi Dhadwal 1/37 (4 overs) | | Saachi Dhadwal 11 (13); Suraksha Kotte 4/11 (4 overs) |

United Arab Emirates won by 153 runs
Kinrara Academy Oval, Kuala Lumpur
Umpires: Samad Akbar (Tha) and Durga Subedi (Nep)
Player of the match: Esha Oza (UAE)

- United Arab Emirates won the toss and elected to bat.
- Sanchin Singh (UAE) made her WT20I debut.

=== Group B ===
| Pos | Team | Pld | W | L | NR | Pts | NRR |
|---|---|---|---|---|---|---|---|
| 1 | Hong Kong | 4 | 4 | 0 | 0 | 8 | 1.532 |
| 2 | Nepal | 4 | 3 | 1 | 0 | 6 | 1.094 |
| 3 | Kuwait | 4 | 1 | 2 | 1 | 3 | −0.777 |
| 4 | Bhutan | 4 | 1 | 3 | 0 | 2 | 0.122 |
| 5 | Bahrain | 4 | 0 | 3 | 1 | 1 | −3.024 |

Source: ESPN Cricinfo

Advanced to the semi-finals

17 June 2022
11:00
Scorecard

| Nepal; 94/9 (20 overs) | v | Bhutan; 44 (17.5 overs) |
| Kajal Shrestha 26 (35); Sonam 4/13 (4 overs) | | Tshering Zangmo 16 (28); Sangita Rai 4/6 (2.5 overs) |

Nepal won by 50 runs
UKM-YSD Cricket Oval, Bangi
Umpires: Anand Natarajan (Sin) and Loganathan Poobalan (Mas)
Player of the match: Sangita Rai (Nep)

- Nepal won the toss and elected to bat.
- Sonam and Sangay Wangmo (Bhu) both made their WT20I debuts.

17 June 2022
15:00
Scorecard

| Bahrain; 40/1 (6.1 overs) | v | Kuwait |
| Tharanga Gajanayake 15* (19); Priyada Murali 1/10 (2 overs) |

No result
Kinrara Academy Oval, Kuala Lumpur
Umpires: Samad Akbar (Tha) and Tabarak Dar (HK)

- Kuwait won the toss and elected to field.
- No further play was possible due to rain.
- Ishara Suhun (Bhr) made her WT20I debut.

18 June 2022
11:00
Scorecard

| Hong Kong; 102/8 (20 overs) | v | Bhutan; 88/7 (20 overs) |
| Mariko Hill 40 (36); Sonam 2/23 (4 overs) | | Tshering Zangmo 25* (37); Mariko Hill 2/15 (4 overs) |

Hong Kong won by 14 runs
UKM-YSD Cricket Oval, Bangi
Umpires: Sarika Prasad (Sin) and Durga Subedi (Nep)
Player of the match: Mariko Hill (HK)

- Bhutan won the toss and elected to field.
- Elysa Hubbard (HK) made her WT20I debut.

18 June 2022
15:00
Scorecard

| Nepal; 107/4 (20 overs) | v | Kuwait; 82/7 (20 overs) |
| Rubina Chhetry 34* (27); Mariamma Hyder 2/10 (4 overs) | | Priyada Murali 31 (40); Sita Rana Magar 2/19 (4 overs) |

Nepal won by 25 runs
Kinrara Academy Oval, Kuala Lumpur
Umpires: Tabarak Dar (HK) and Viswanadan Kalidas (Mas)
Player of the match: Rubina Chhetry (Nep)

- Kuwait won the toss and elected to field.

19 June 2022
10:30
Scorecard

| Bahrain; 79/9 (20 overs) | v | Hong Kong; 81/2 (11.2 overs) |
| Deepika Rasangika 47* (49); Iqra Sahar 2/8 (4 overs) | | Kary Chan 23* (19); Gayani Fernando 1/21 (2 overs) |

Hong Kong won by 8 wickets
Kinrara Academy Oval, Kuala Lumpur
Umpires: Samad Akbar (Tha) and Sarika Prasad (Sin)
Player of the match: Kary Chan (HK)

- Hong Kong won the toss elected to field first.
- Poorvaja Jagdeesha (Bhr) made her WT20I debut.

20 June 2022
10:30
Scorecard

| Bahrain; 14/6 (7 overs) | v | Nepal; 15/2 (3.4 overs) |
| Ishara Suhun 6 (10); Kabita Kunwar 2/2 (2 overs) | | Sita Rana Magar 4 (3); Pavithra Shetty 1/3 (2 overs) |

Nepal won by 8 wickets
Kinrara Academy Oval, Kuala Lumpur
Umpires: Samad Akbar (Tha) and Viswanadan Kalidas (Mas)
Player of the match: Kabita Kunwar (Nep)

- Nepal won the toss and elected to field.
- The match was reduced to 7 overs per side due to rain.

21 June 2022
10:30
Scorecard

| Bhutan; 112 (19.4 overs) | v | Kuwait; 116/7 (19 overs) |
| Ngawang Choden 28 (34); Amna Tariq 2/20 (4 overs) | | Maryam Omar 46 (53); Anju Gurung 2/22 (4 overs) |

Kuwait won by 3 wickets
Kinrara Academy Oval, Kuala Lumpur
Umpires: Anand Natarajan (Sin) and Narayanan Sivan (Mas)
Player of the match: Maryam Omar (Kuw)

- Kuwait won the toss and elected to field.

21 June 2022
14:15
Scorecard

| Nepal; 109/6 (20 overs) | v | Hong Kong; 112/3 (15.5 overs) |
| Rubina Chhetri 32* (36); Betty Chan 2/17 (4 overs) | | Mariko Hill 45 (32); Sangita Rai 2/20 (2 overs) |

Hong Kong won by 7 wickets
Kinrara Academy Oval, Kuala Lumpur
Umpires: Anand Natarajan (Sin) and Loganathan Poobalan (Mas)
Player of the match: Mariko Hill (HK)

- Nepal won the toss and elected to bat.

22 June 2022
10:30
Scorecard

| Hong Kong; 90/8 (20 overs) | v | Kuwait; 60 (17.4 overs) |
| Natasha Miles 28 (36); Amna Tariq 3/13 (4 overs) | | Maryam Omar 22 (28); Maryam Bibi 4/8 (4 overs) |

Hong Kong won by 30 runs
UKM-YSD Cricket Oval, Bangi
Umpires: Viswanadan Kalidas (Mas) and Loganathan Poobalan (Mas)
Player of the match: Maryam Bibi (HK)

- Kuwait won the toss and elected to field.

22 June 2022
14:15
Scorecard

| Bhutan; 126/2 (20 overs) | v | Bahrain; 63/6 (20 overs) |
| Dechen Wangmo 64* (52); Prajna Jagdeesha 1/14 (2 overs) | | Tharanga Gajanayake 30 (37); Anju Gurung 2/7 (4 overs) |

Bhutan won by 63 runs
UKM-YSD Cricket Oval, Bangi
Umpires: Loganathan Poobalan (Mas) and Narayanan Sivan (Mas)
Player of the match: Dechen Wangmo (Bhu)

- Bahrain won the toss and elected to field.
- Dechen Zangmo (Bhu) made her WT20I debut.

== Semi-finals ==
24 June 2022
10:30
Scorecard

| United Arab Emirates; 81 (19.5 overs) | v | Nepal |
| Vaishnave Mahesh 16 (11); Asmina Karmacharya 5/10 (3.5 overs) |

No result
Kinrara Academy Oval, Kuala Lumpur
Umpires: Tabarak Dar (HK) and Viswanadan Kalidas (Mas)

- Nepal won the toss and elected to field.
- No further play was possible due to rain.
- United Arab Emirates Women progressed to the final due a higher net run rate during the group stage.
- Asmina Karmacharya (Nep) took her first five-wicket haul in WT20Is.

24 June 2022
14:15
Scorecard

| Malaysia; 86/4 (11 overs) | v | Hong Kong; 74/8 (11 overs) |
| Mas Elysa 33* (24); Maryam Bibi 2/23 (2 overs) | | Kary Chan 19 (10); Nik Nur Atiela 2/9 (2 overs) |

Malaysia won by 12 runs
Kinrara Academy Oval, Kuala Lumpur
Umpires: Sarika Prasad (Sin) and Durga Subedi (Nep)
Player of the match: Mas Elysa (Mas)

- Hong Kong won the toss and elected to field.
- The match was reduced to 11 overs per side due to rain.

== Final ==
25 June 2022
10:30
Scorecard

| Malaysia; 100/4 (20 overs) | v | United Arab Emirates; 101/5 (18.2 overs) |
| Ainna Hamizah Hashim 28* (38); Indhuja Nandakumar 2/17 (4 overs) | | Theertha Satish 55 (42); Aisya Eleesa 1/10 (2.4 overs) |

United Arab Emirates won by 5 wickets
Kinrara Academy Oval, Kuala Lumpur
Umpires: Anand Natarajan (Mas) and Durga Subedi (Nep)
Player of the match: Theertha Satish (UAE)

- Malaysia won the toss and elected to bat.
