= Anju Gurung =

Bhutanese cricketer (born 1994)

Personal information
- Full name: Anju Gurung
- Born: 10 April 1994 (age 32)
- Batting: Right-handed
- Bowling: Left-arm medium
- Role: Bowler

International information
- National side: Bhutan (2009–present)
- T20I debut (cap 5): 13 January 2019 v Hong Kong
- Last T20I: 16 May 2025 v Kuwait

Career statistics
Competition	WT20I
Matches	34
Runs scored	60
Batting average	4.61
100s/50s	0/0
Top score	11*
Balls bowled	726
Wickets	34
Bowling average	13.73
5 wickets in innings	0
10 wickets in match	0
Best bowling	3/6
Catches/stumpings	4/–
- Source: Cricinfo, 16 May 2025

Anju Gurung (born 10 April 1994) is a Bhutanese cricketer who plays for the national women's cricket team as a pace bowler. She is currently the Captain of the team, and a household name in Bhutan.

== Early life and career ==
Gurung hails from Gelephu, a small Bhutanese town on the border with India. She first played cricket at the age of 13. One day, her primary school sports teacher announced that a new game named cricket was going to be introduced. Gurung had not even heard of the game, but thought it had an interesting name, and therefore signed up for it. Soon afterwards, she began training and enrolled in training camps.

Since starting to play the game, Gurung has been surrounded by balls and bats, and has never looked back. She has said that she is still involved in the game because her mother has always supported her. In particular, her mother never differentiated between Gurung and her brothers.

However, Gurung also needed to overcome quite a few challenges, and especially the lack of facilities in Bhutan for any form of sports training. She just had to make do with the limited resources available to her.

== Domestic career ==
At the domestic level, Gurung plays only against men's teams. Her playing role is as a left arm inswing pace bowler.

== International career ==
Since women's cricket was first played in Bhutan, Gurung has been part of the women's national team. She was one of the players who turned out for Bhutan women's international cricketing debut, against Qatar at the ACC Women's Twenty20 Championship in Malaysia on 3 July 2009.

Nearly five years later, on 17 February 2014, in Bhutan's final match of the 2014 ACC Women's Premier tournament, held in Thailand in a 40 overs a side format, Gurung took 2/13 to help her team beat Iran in the play-off for fifth and sixth places.

In March 2018, Gurung had further success during the ASEAN Women's T20 Open Tournament, held in Thailand. On 8 March 2018, Bhutan batted first against Indonesia and scored only 48 runs, but Gurung then took 4/17, including by bowling both of Indonesia's opening pair of Yulia Anggraeni and Puji Haryanti, each for a duck, before Indonesia won the match by four wickets.

Four days later, on 12 March 2018, Bhutan again batted first, against Thailand, and scored only 16 runs. Gurung then opened the bowling for Bhutan, and bowled both of Thailand's opening pair, Natthakan Chantam and Naruemol Chaiwai, again each for a duck. Thailand later won the match by 8 wickets, with Gurung's final figures being 2/4.

On 13 January 2019, Gurung made her WT20I debut for Bhutan against Hong Kong at the Terdthai Cricket Ground, Bangkok, in a Group B match of the Thailand Women's T20 Smash, which was also Bhutan's first ever WT20I. Her best performance in that tournament was 2/16 against Indonesia.

Gurung's and Bhutan's next WT20I matches were at the ICC Women's T20 World Cup Asia Qualifier in Dubai in November 2021. In that tournament, Gurung's best figures were against Hong Kong; she took 3/10, including the wicket of Hong Kong skipper Kary Chan. Arguably the tournament's leading bowler, she ended up with a total of 7 wickets in her 5 games, at an economy rate of 4.05.

In March 2022, Gurung, by then the vice-captain of the Bhutanese team, was recruited to play in the 2022 FairBreak Invitational T20 tournament in Dubai in May 2022. She had been one of five Bhutanese players nominated by Cricket Bhutan's CEO as a potential recruit, after he had earlier contacted FairBreak's managing director to enquire about the tournament. On 19 April 2022, Gurung departed from Bhutan to undergo a 10-day training session with cricketers from Thailand, under the auspices of the Cricket Association of Thailand.

During the tournament, Gurung played for the Falcons team. She emerged as one of the stars. Her very first wicket in the tournament was of English batter Sophia Dunkley, who was threatening to take a game away from the Falcons. Later, in one of the semi-finals, against Spirit, she played a crucial role in the Falcons' victory, by dismissing both of Spirit's opening batters, Sarah Bryce and Natthakan Chantam. The Falcons eventually finished as runners-up to the Tornadoes, and she was named in the team of the tournament.

== Playing style ==
Guring is said to have "... a smooth run-up, rhythmical action, and an exaggerated leap before she delivers the ball." As well as being accurate, she is also claimed to have "... the rare ability to bring the ball back into right-handers." She uses that ability to compensate for her shortness of stature. She also has what she describes as "... a good yorker along with a deceptive slower ball ..."

== Off the field ==
Gurung is a household name in Bhutan. Many young, aspiring female cricketers look up to her. In a profile published in February 2022, Bhutan Cricket claimed that "[w]ith her big nerd glasses, unkempt blonde hair, and bright smile, [she] looks more like a pop star ..."

== See also ==
- List of Bhutan women Twenty20 International cricketers
