= List of Qatar women Twenty20 International cricketers =

This is a list of Qatar women Twenty20 International cricketers. A Women's Twenty20 International (WT20I) is an international cricket match between two representative teams. A T20I is played under the rules of Twenty20 cricket. In April 2018, the International Cricket Council (ICC) granted full international status to Twenty20 women's matches played between member sides from 1 July 2018 onwards. Qatar women played their first WT20I on 17 January 2020 against Oman during the 2020 Qatar Women's T20I Triangular Series.

The list is arranged in the order in which each player won her first Twenty20 cap. Where more than one player won her first Twenty20 cap in the same match, those players are listed alphabetically by surname.

== Key ==
General

- ‡ – Captain
- † – Wicket-keeper
- First – Year of debut
- Last – Year of latest game
- Mat – Number of matches played

Batting

- Runs – Runs scored in career
- HS – Highest score
- Avg – Runs scored per dismissal
- * – Batsman remained not out
- 50 – Number of half centuries
- 100 – Centuries scored

Bowling

- Balls – Balls bowled in career
- Wkt – Wickets taken in career
- BBI – Best bowling in an innings
- Ave – Average runs per wicket

Fielding

- Ca – Catches taken
- St – Stumpings affected

== Players ==
Statistics are correct as of 6 June 2026.

Qatar women T20I cricketers
General					Batting					Bowling				Fielding		Ref
No.	Name	First	Last	Mat	Runs	HS	Avg	50	100	Balls	Wkt	BBI	Ave	Ca	St	Ref
1	Aisha Rahman†	2020	2022	5	9	7	3.00	0	0	–	–	–	–	1	0	
2	Aleena Khan	2020	2023	26	130	25	5.90	0	0	236	6	1/13	47.66	3	0	
3	Aysha Abdur Rahman‡	2020	2026	53	1014	113*	22.04	1	1	739	35	3/10	22.97	12	0	
4	Saachi Dhadwal	2020	2024	30	308	51*	11.40	1	0	409	18	2/9	23.05	7	0	
5	Trupti Kale†	2020	2026	23	39	12	4.33	0	0	–	–	–	–	2	4	
6	Khadija Imtiaz	2020	2026	43	169	22*	6.50	0	0	242	14	2/6	17.92	4	0	
7	Angeline Mare	2020	2025	34	217	36	9.04	0	0	444	15	3/10	29.06	9	0	
8	Nahan Arif	2020	2020	4	19	13	6.33	0	0	90	5	2/22	16.00	2	0	
9	Rochelle Quyn	2020	2023	25	57	9	4.07	0	0	492	16	2/5	27.93	4	0	
10	Akshata Sanguelkar	2020	2020	4	5	3	2.50	0	0	30	1	1/8	14.00	0	0	
11	Shahreen Bahadur	2020	2026	46	427	104*	11.23	0	1	493	22	2/5	25.22	6	0	
12	Sabah Nawab	2020	2020	2	1	1*	–	0	0	–	–	–	–	0	0	
13	Hiral Agarwal	2021	2025	24	79	22	4.64	0	0	372	17	4/4	22.23	1	0	
14	Rizpha Bano Emmanuel†	2021	2026	29	302	58	15.10	1	0	12	0	–	–	9	3	
15	Sabeeja Panayan‡	2021	2025	26	63	23*	4.84	0	0	415	13	4/13	38.15	2	0	
16	Kerry Pounsett	2021	2022	8	35	15	5.83	0	0	–	–	–	–	0	0	
17	Shrutiben Rana†	2021	2026	31	301	57*	11.14	1	0	6	0	–	–	5	1	
18	Reeva Shah	2021	2021	1	–	–	–	–	–	–	–	–	–	0	0	
19	Lavanya Pillai	2022	2022	2	1	1*	–	0	0	–	–	–	–	0	0	
20	Sarrinah Ahmed	2022	2025	8	–	–	–	–	–	–	–	–	–	0	0	
21	Devanandha Kavinisseri	2022	2024	4	14	14*	–	0	0	18	0	–	–	1	0	
22	Sudha Thapa	2023	2025	13	25	11*	5.00	0	0	210	12	3/18	16.33	4	0	
23	Krishna Bhuva	2024	2024	3	0	0	0.00	0	0	–	–	–	–	0	0	
24	Taful Elkhair	2024	2026	12	30	15	5.00	0	0	25	0	–	–	1	0	
25	Amma Kashif	2024	2025	6	0	0*	–	0	0	36	1	1/7	38.00	0	0	
26	Maria Jacob	2024	2026	20	52	12*	6.50	0	0	288	13	3/25	22.61	7	0	
27	Roheed Akhtar	2024	2025	14	44	15	6.28	0	0	270	11	2/14	25.27	3	0	
28	Sargam Patel	2024	2026	9	35	18	11.66	0	0	–	–	–	–	0	0	
29	Christeena Jacob	2025	2026	15	190	47	13.57	0	0	–	–	–	–	5	0	
30	Gertrude Candiru (Note: Gertrude Candiru also played 5 WT20I matches for Uganda. Only her record for Qatar is given above.)	2025	2026	16	252	62*	22.90	2	0	318	14	4/15	23.71	3	0	
31	Lihara Ayeysekara	2025	2026	8	4	3	1.33	0	0	92	3	2/25	45.00	1	0	
32	Krisheta Sarvanakumar†	2025	2026	16	179	47	13.76	0	0	79	6	3/20	14.50	4	4	
33	Amina Kashif	2025	2026	8	5	3*	5.00	0	0	96	5	3/32	25.80	1	0	
34	Pavithra Selvam	2026	2026	4	–	–	–	–	–	–	–	–	–	0	0	
35	Sneha Chandani	2026	2026	1	1	1	1.00	0	0	6	0	–	–	5	0	
36	Fatima Mukadam	2026	2026	5	31	17	10.33	0	0	–	–	–	–	0	0	
37	Roshni Sebastian	2026	2026	3	0	0	0.00	0	0	48	1	1/17	48.00	0	0	
38	Jaza Mariyam	2026	2026	2	5	5	2.50	0	0	30	1	1/9	29.00	0	0	
