= 2013 ACC Women's Championship =

- Dates: 23 – 31 January 2013
- Administrator: Asian Cricket Council
- Cricket format: 25-over
- Tournament format(s): Group stage, playoffs
- Host: Thailand
- Champions: Thailand (1st title)
- Participants: 11
- Matches: 32
- Player of the series: (Thailand) Somnarin Tippoch
- Most runs: (China) Zhang Mei (269)
- Most wickets: (Thailand) Chanida Sutthiruang (18)

The 2013 ACC Women's Championship was an international women's cricket tournament held in Chiang Mai Province, Thailand, from 23 to 31 January 2013. It was organised by the Asian Cricket Council (ACC).

Unlike the two previous ACC women's tournaments, where matches were played using the Twenty20 format, matches at the 2013 event were played over 25 overs. Eleven teams participated in the tournament, up from ten at the previous edition. Iran and Qatar returned to the competition for the first time since the 2009 tournament, while Oman did not return. The teams were divided into uneven groups of five and six, with the top two teams in each group progressing to the final. China, undefeated in the group stages, eventually met Thailand in the final, but were defeated by 17 runs. Thailand consequently qualified for the 2013 World Twenty20 Qualifier in Ireland, which was the qualification tournament for the 2014 World Twenty20.

== Group stages ==
=== Group A ===
Team	Pld	W	L	NR	Pts	NRR
Nepal	4	4	0	0	8	+2.470
Hong Kong	4	3	1	0	6	+0.611
Bhutan	4	2	2	0	4	–0.029
Malaysia	4	1	3	0	2	–1.058
United Arab Emirates	4	0	4	0	0	–1.915
Source: CricketArchive

23 January
Scorecard

Bhutan; 133/4 (25 overs)	v	Malaysia; 101/6 (25 overs)

Bhutan won by 32 runs
Gymkhana Club, Chiang Mai

23 January
Scorecard

UAE; 56/7 (25 overs)	v	Hong Kong; 57/6 (12.5 overs)

Hong Kong won by 4 wickets
Royal Chiang Mai Golf Club, Chiang Mai

24 January
Scorecard

Bhutan; 65/8 (25 overs)	v	Nepal; 68/2 (13.4 overs)

Nepal won by 8 wickets
Prem Tinsulanonda International School, Chiang Mai

24 January
Scorecard

Hong Kong; 121/7 (25 overs)	v	Malaysia; 100/6 (25 overs)

Hong Kong won by 21 runs
Gymkhana Club, Chiang Mai

25 January
Scorecard

Nepal; 145/5 (25 overs)	v	UAE; 59 (22.4 overs)

Nepal won by 86 runs
Gymkhana Club, Chiang Mai

27 January
Scorecard

Hong Kong; 105/7 (25 overs)	v	Bhutan; 89/8 (25 overs)

Hong Kong won by 16 runs
Prem Tinsulanonda International School, Chiang Mai

27 January
Scorecard

Malaysia; 65/8 (25 overs)	v	Nepal; 66/3 (11.3 overs)

Nepal won by 7 wickets
Royal Chiang Mai Golf Club, Chiang Mai

28 January
Scorecard

UAE; 67 (23 overs)	v	Bhutan; 68/3 (18 overs)

Bhutan won by 7 wickets
Royal Chiang Mai Golf Club, Chiang Mai

28 January
Scorecard

Hong Kong; 54 (21.4 overs)	v	Nepal; 55/4 (18 overs)

Nepal won by 6 wickets
Prem Tinsulanonda International School, Chiang Mai

29 January
Scorecard

United Arab Emirates; 89/4 (25 overs)	v	Malaysia; 90/9 (22 overs)

Malaysia won by 1 wicket
Prem Tinsulanonda International School, Chiang Mai

=== Group B ===
Team	Pld	W	L	NR	Pts	NRR
China	5	5	0	0	10	+5.705
Thailand	5	4	1	0	8	+3.712
Iran	5	3	2	0	6	–1.737
Qatar	5	1	4	0	2	–1.995
Singapore	5	1	4	0	2	–2.132
Kuwait	5	1	4	0	2	–3.652
Source: CricketArchive

23 January
Scorecard

China; 221/2 (25 overs)	v	Iran; 54 (21 overs)

China won by 167 runs
Gymkhana Club, Chiang Mai

23 January
Scorecard

Singapore; 114/8 (25 overs)	v	Kuwait; 115/1 (21 overs)

Kuwait won by 9 wickets
Prem Tinsulanonda International School, Chiang Mai

23 January
Scorecard

Qatar; 33 (14.4 overs)	v	Thailand; 35/0 (4.4 overs)

Thailand won by 10 wickets
Royal Chiang Mai Golf Club, Chiang Mai

24 January
Scorecard

Kuwait; 17 (14.4 overs)	v	Thailand; 18/0 (2 overs)

Thailand won by 10 wickets
Royal Chiang Mai Golf Club, Chiang Mai

24 January
Scorecard

Singapore; 27 (17.5 overs)	v	China; 28/1 (5.1 overs)

China won by 9 wickets
Royal Chiang Mai Golf Club, Chiang Mai

24 January
Scorecard

Qatar; 91/8 (25 overs)	v	Iran; 93/4 (18 overs)

Iran won by 6 wickets
Prem Tinsulanonda International School, Chiang Mai

25 January
Scorecard

China; 272/3 (25 overs)	v	Kuwait; 35 (18.1 overs)

China won by 237 runs
Prem Tinsulanonda International School, Chiang Mai

25 January
Scorecard

Singapore; 134/4 (25 overs)	v	Qatar; 118/7 (25 overs)

Singapore won by 16 runs
Gymkhana Club, Chiang Mai

25 January
Scorecard

Iran; 41 (23.4 overs)	v	Thailand; 42/0 (6 overs)

Thailand won by 10 wickets
Royal Chiang Mai Golf Club, Chiang Mai

27 January
Scorecard

Kuwait; 129/6 (25 overs)	v	Iran; 130/2 (21 overs)

Iran won by 8 wickets
Gymkhana Club, Chiang Mai

27 January
Scorecard

China; 157/2 (25 overs)	v	Qatar; 46 (21.2 overs)

China won by 111 runs
Royal Chiang Mai Golf Club, Chiang Mai

27 January
Scorecard

Thailand; 214/4 (25 overs)	v	Singapore; 85/8 (25 overs)

Thailand won by 129 runs
Prem Tinsulanonda International School, Chiang Mai

28 January
Scorecard

Kuwait; 85 (18.3 overs)	v	Qatar; 86/5 (18.1 overs)

Qatar won by 5 wickets
Gymkhana Club, Chiang Mai

28 January
Scorecard

Singapore; 88/7 (25 overs)	v	Iran; 89/4 (22.3 overs)

Iran won by 6 wickets
Royal Chiang Mai Golf Club, Chiang Mai

28 January
Scorecard

China; 118 (25 overs)	v	Thailand; 71 (19 overs)

China won by 47 runs
Prem Tinsulanonda International School, Chiang Mai

== Finals ==
=== Semi-finals ===
30 January
Scorecard

Nepal; 38 (20 overs)	v	Thailand; 39/3 (16 overs)

Thailand won by 7 wickets
Prem Tinsulanonda International School, Chiang Mai

30 January
Scorecard

China; 158/2 (25 overs)	v	Hong Kong; 72 (24.1 overs)

China won by 86 runs
Prem Tinsulanonda International School, Chiang Mai

=== Final ===
31 January
Scorecard

Thailand; 95/6 (25 overs)	v	China; 78 (24.4 overs)

Thailand won by 17 runs
Royal Chiang Mai Golf Club, Chiang Mai

- The match was initially scheduled to be held at the Prem Tinsulanonda International School, but was moved to the Royal Chiang Mai Golf Club due to forecast inclement weather.

== Placement matches ==
=== 3rd-place play-off ===
31 January
Scorecard

Hong Kong; 32/9 (19 overs)	v	Nepal; 33/2 (7.3 overs)

Nepal won by 8 wickets
Gymkhana Club, Chiang Mai

- Rain reduced the match to 19 overs per side.

=== 5th-place play-off ===
30 January
Scorecard

Bhutan; 74 (21.3 overs)	v	Iran; 75/7 (18.3 overs)

Bhutan won by 3 wickets
Gymkhana Club, Chiang Mai

=== 7th-place play-off ===
30 January
Scorecard

Malaysia; 81/6 (25 overs)	v	Qatar; 45 (19 overs)

Malaysia won by 36 runs
Royal Chiang Mai Golf Club, Chiang Mai

=== 9th-place play-off ===
30 February
Scorecard

Singapore; 110/8 (25 overs)	v	UAE; 73/8 (25 overs)

Singapore won by 37 runs
Royal Chiang Mai Golf Club, Chiang Mai

== Statistics ==
=== Most runs ===
The top five runscorers are included in this table, ranked by runs scored and then by batting average.

Player	Team	Runs	Inns	Avg	Highest	100s	50s
Zhang Mei	China	269	7	67.25	89*	0	2
Huang Zhuo	China	187	6	46.75	71*	0	1
Somnarin Tippoch	Thailand	186	5	93.00	108*	1	0
G. K. Diviya	Singapore	136	6	22.66	52	0	1
Sun Huan	China	135	5	45.00	75*	0	1

Source: CricketArchive

=== Most wickets ===
The top five wicket takers are listed in this table, ranked by wickets taken and then by bowling average.

Player	Team	Overs	Wkts	Ave	SR	Econ	BBI
Chanida Sutthiruang	Thailand	31.4	18	3.66	10.55	2.08	5/2
Zhou Haijie	China	27.3	14	4.07	11.78	2.07	4/3
Han Lili	China	29.0	14	5.21	12.42	2.51	4/10
Somnarin Tippoch	Thailand	31.4	13	5.30	14.61	2.17	6/6
Wu Juan	China	29.5	9	7.00	19.88	2.11	2/5

Source: CricketArchive

== Final standing ==
Rank	Team
1	Thailand
2	China
3	Nepal
4	Hong Kong
5	Bhutan
6	Iran
7	Malaysia
8	Qatar
9	Singapore
10	United Arab Emirates
11	Kuwait
