= Vaishali Jesrani =

Omani cricketer (born 1981)

Personal information
- Full name: Vaishali Madhursinh Jesrani
- Born: 27 July 1981 (age 45)
- Batting: Right-handed
- Role: Wicket-keeper

International information
- National side: Oman
- T20I debut (cap 5): 17 January 2020 v Qatar
- Last T20I: 22 June 2022 v Malaysia

Career statistics
Competition	WT20I
Matches	17
Runs scored	167
Batting average	10.43
100s/50s	0/0
Top score	29
Catches/stumpings	1/5
- Source: Cricinfo, 30 November 2022

Vaishali Jesrani (born 27 July 1981) is a women's cricketer who plays for the Oman national cricket team. In January 2020, she was named in the Oman women's national squad for the 2020 Qatar Women's T20I Triangular Series tournament which was also the international WT20I debut for Oman national team. She made her WT20I debut against Qatar on 17 January 2020. She was formerly the captain of the Oman women's cricket team.
