= List of Oman women Twenty20 International cricketers =

This is a list of Oman women Twenty20 International cricketers. A Women's Twenty20 International (WT20I) is an international cricket match between two representative teams. A T20I is played under the rules of Twenty20 cricket. In April 2018, the International Cricket Council (ICC) granted full international status to Twenty20 women's matches played between member sides from 1 July 2018 onwards. Oman women played their first WT20I on 17 January 2020 against Qatar during the 2020 Qatar Women's T20I Triangular Series.

The list is arranged in the order in which each player won her first Twenty20 cap. Where more than one player won her first Twenty20 cap in the same match, those players are listed alphabetically by surname.

== Key ==
General

- ‡ – Captain
- † – Wicket-keeper
- First – Year of debut
- Last – Year of latest game
- Mat – Number of matches played

Batting

- Runs – Runs scored in career
- HS – Highest score
- Avg – Runs scored per dismissal
- * – Batsman remained not out
- 50 – Number of half centuries
- 100 – Number of centuries

Bowling

- Balls – Balls bowled in career
- Wkt – Wickets taken in career
- BBI – Best bowling in an innings
- Ave – Average runs per wicket

Fielding

- Ca – Catches taken
- St – Stumpings affected

== Players ==
Statistics are correct as of 23 August 2026.

Oman women T20I cricketers
General					Batting					Bowling				Fielding		Ref
No.	Name	First	Last	Mat	Runs	HS	Avg	50	100	Balls	Wkt	BBI	Ave	Ca	St	Ref
1	Fiza Javed‡†	2020	2026	49	780	76*	21.08	1	0	296	16	3/18	17.37	12	0	
2	Nikhita Jagadish	2020	2022	15	14	6*	7.00	0	0	162	3	2/18	51.33	1	0	
3	Javed Hina	2020	2026	42	302	60*	10.41	1	0	6	0	–	–	6	0	
4	Javed Hira	2020	2020	9	121	38	24.20	0	0	–	–	–	–	1	0	
5	Vaishali Jesrani‡†	2020	2022	17	167	29	10.43	0	0	–	–	–	–	1	5	
6	Priyanka Mendonca‡	2020	2026	49	625	62*	19.53	1	0	978	51	5/18	14.94	9	0	
7	Snehal Nair	2020	2022	12	1	1	0.50	0	0	269	9	2/19	24.22	0	0	
8	Sameera Khan	2020	2026	50	184	41*	11.50	0	0	491	15	2/6	32.00	11	0	
9	Bhakti Shetty	2020	2022	17	75	26	10.71	0	0	319	15	2/8	19.86	2	0	
10	Sakshi Shetty†	2020	2024	21	360	71*	18.00	1	0	–	–	–	–	3	0	
11	Yashika Verma	2020	2020	8	21	16	3.50	0	0	174	3	1/7	52.66	0	0	
12	Sani Zehra	2020	2024	3	0	0	0.00	0	0	54	1	1/29	76.00	1	0	
13	Anshita Tiwary	2020	2020	3	1	1*	–	0	0	48	3	3/8	16.00	0	0	
14	Ananya Shetty	2020	2020	2	2	2	2.00	0	0	39	1	1/27	59.00	0	0	
15	Nayan Anil	2022	2022	9	102	55	12.75	1	0	–	–	–	–	0	0	
16	Saya Channa	2022	2022	9	44	18*	14.66	0	0	162	7	2/19	18.57	1	0	
17	Amanda Dcosta	2022	2026	38	147	27	7.73	0	0	775	41	5/11	16.48	12	0	
18	Afida Afthab	2022	2026	32	7	3	7.00	0	0	363	12	2/11	25.58	4	0	
19	Kashish Jayawant	2022	2022	2	7	4	7.00	0	0	29	3	3/2	5.66	0	0	
20	Sushanthika Sathiya	2022	2026	20	48	15*	8.00	0	0	360	17	4/24	18.82	3	0	
21	Alifiya Sayed	2022	2026	25	3	1*	1.50	0	0	382	12	3/22	29.33	1	0	
22	Akshadha Gunasekar	2024	2024	3	8	5	4.00	0	0	42	0	–	–	0	0	
23	Nitya Joshi	2024	2026	30	437	49	16.18	0	0	6	–	–	–	1	0	
24	Trupti Pawde	2024	2026	17	184	29	15.33	0	0	–	–	–	–	2	0	
25	Shreya Prabhu	2024	2024	1	–	–	–	–	–	–	–	–	–	0	0	
26	Cynthia Saldanha†	2024	2026	34	40	10	5.71	0	0	–	–	–	–	7	8	
27	Sahana Jeelany†	2024	2026	5	1	1	1.00	0	0	45	2	1/2	16.50	0	0	
28	Sushama Shetty	2024	2024	1	0	0	0.00	0	0	6	1	1/3	3.00	0	0	
29	Jayadhanyha Gunasekar	2025	2026	28	922	101*	43.90	5	1	516	24	2/2	16.79	12	0	
30	Lujaina	2025	2026	15	29	21	4.83	0	0	42	2	2/15	17.50	1	0	
31	Areeba Mughal	2025	2026	2	–	–	–	–	–	12	0	–	–	0	0	
32	Kushi Egodagamage	2026	2026	5	18	10	6.00	0	0	42	4	3/24	8.25	0	0	
33	Amishi Sarkar†	2026	2026	1	–	–	–	–	–	–	–	–	–	1	0	
34	Pia Sharma	2026	2026	4	14	12*	7.00	0	0	54	2	1/20	28.50	1	0	
