= Neisha Pratt =

Hong Kong and Singapore cricketer

Personal information
- Full name: Neisha Anne Pratt
- Born: 21 March 1973 (age 53); Te Awamutu, New Zealand
- Batting: Right-handed
- Bowling: Left-arm medium
- Role: All-rounder

International information
- National sides: Hong Kong; Singapore
- T20I debut (cap 5): 9 August 2018; Singapore v Malaysia
- Last T20I: 12 August 2018; Singapore v Malaysia

Domestic team information
- Years: Team
- 1999/00 – 2000/01: Northern Districts Spirit

Career statistics
Competition	WT20I
Matches	5
Runs scored	91
Batting average	18.20
100s/50s	0/0
Top score	48
Catches/stumpings	1/0
- Source: Cricinfo, 15 April 2021

Neisha Anne Pratt (born 21 March 1973) is a cricket player, born in New Zealand, who has played international cricket for both Hong Kong and Singapore and also NZ domestic cricket for Northern Districts Spirit. She represented Hong Kong between 2006 and 2011, and also captained the side. She made her Twenty20 International debut for Singapore against Malaysia in August 2018, at the age of 45.

== Hong Kong career ==
Pratt captained Hong Kong in their first official match in 2006, and as a result received cap number 1; the match was an Asian qualifying round match for the 2009 Women's Cricket World Cup. she took 1/44 from 10 overs and scored 16 runs as Hong Kong lost to Pakistan. She captained the team in a 2007 Asian Cricket Council 30-over tournament in Malaysia. In the opening match against Malaysia, she scored 71 runs in 77 balls, and took 4/4 in 6 overs. In a 2008 series in Bangladesh, Pratt top-scored in the final two matches, making 35 in the second match of the series, and 61 in the final match.

Pratt also captained the side that won the 2009 ACC Women's Twenty20 Championship. She scored a partnership of 76 with Keenu Gill in a group-stage match against China, which was the highest partnership in the group stages, and was also the player of the match in the group stage matches against Kuwait and Malaysia. In the final against Thailand, Pratt scored 27 runs.

In 2012, Pratt became ineligible to play for Hong Kong, as a change in eligibility criteria meant that only players eligible to play in the Asian Games could compete. In protest at Pratt's exclusion, Connie Wong and Keenu Gill withdrew from the 2012 Asian Cricket Council Women's Twenty20 Asia Cup, and were subsequently banned for a year.

== Singapore career ==
Pratt returned to international cricket in 2016 by playing for Singapore against Malaysia in the Saudari Cup. She hit 76* and 60* in consecutive games. The 2018 series had Twenty20 International status for the first time. She played in all five matches in the series. Her final appearance came at the age of 45 years, 144 days, at the time only behind Caroline de Fouw of Netherlands as the oldest women T20I player (since surpassed by some others).
