= Bhutan women's national cricket team =

Cricket team

Bhutan
- Nickname: Lady Dragons
- Association: Bhutan Cricket Council Board

Personnel
- Captain: Anju Gurung
- Coach: Arzoo Raj

Team information
- Home ground: Gelephu International Cricket Ground

International Cricket Council
- ICC status: Associate member (2017); Affiliate member (2001)
- ICC region: Asia
ICC Rankings	Current	Best-ever
T20I	55th	39th (6 Feb 2019)

International cricket
- First international: v Qatar at Kuala Lumpur; 3 July 2009

T20 Internationals
- First T20I: v Hong Kong at Terdthai Cricket Ground, Bangkok; 13 January 2019
- Last T20I: v Qatar at Kolej Tuanku Ja'afar Cricket Oval, Mantin; 6 June 2026
T20Is	Played	Won/Lost
Total	43	12/31 (0 ties, 0 no result)
This year	9	4/5 (0 ties, 0 no results)
- As of 6 June 2026

The Bhutan women's national cricket team, nicknamed The Lady Dragons, represents Bhutan in international women's cricket. The team is organised by the Bhutan Cricket Council Board, which has been a member of the International Cricket Council (ICC) since 2001. The team made its international debut against Qatar in 2009.

Arzoo Raj serves as the head coach of the team whereas Anju Gurung serves as the captain of the team.

== History ==
Bhutan made its international debut at the 2009 ACC Women's Twenty20 Championship in Malaysia. The team won its first match against Qatar (another international debutant) by 42 runs, but lost its four other group-stage games. However, in the ninth-place play-off against Oman, Bhutan won by 101 runs, and consequently finished the tournament ranked ninth out of twelve teams. At the tournament's 2011 edition, Bhutan again won only a single group-stage game, against Oman, and were defeated by Kuwait in the seventh-place play-off. The team returned to international competition at the 2013 ACC Women's Championship, where matches were played over 25 overs. In the group stage, Bhutan defeated both Malaysia and the United Arab Emirates, finishing third. They went on to narrowly defeat Iran in the fifth-place play-off. Both Bhutan and Iran qualified for the 2014 ACC Women's Premier competition as a result of finishing among the top six teams.

In April 2018, the ICC granted full Women's Twenty20 International (WT20I) status to all its members. Therefore, all Twenty20 matches played between Bhutan women and another international side after 1 July 2018 have the full WT20I status. Bhutan made its Twenty20 International debut in Bangkok on 12 January 2019 against Hong Kong at the 2019 Thailand Women's T20 Smash.

In December 2020, the ICC announced the qualification pathway for the 2023 ICC Women's T20 World Cup. The Bhutan women's team made their debut at an ICC women's event when they played in the 2021 ICC Women's T20 World Cup Asia Qualifier group, opening their campaign with a 40-run victory against Kuwait.

== Tournament history ==
=== ICC Women's World Cup ===
World Cup record
Year	Round	Position	GP	W	L	T	NR
(England) 1973	Did not qualify/No women's ODI status						
(India) 1978	Did not qualify/No women's ODI status						
(New Zealand) 1982	Did not qualify/No women's ODI status						
(Australia) 1988	Did not qualify/No women's ODI status						
(England) 1993	Did not qualify/No women's ODI status						
(India) 1997	Did not qualify/No women's ODI status						
(New Zealand) 2000	Did not qualify/No women's ODI status						
(South Africa) 2005	Did not qualify/No women's ODI status						
(Australia) 2009	Did not qualify/No women's ODI status						
(India) 2013	Did not qualify/No women's ODI status						
(England) 2017	Did not qualify/No women's ODI status						
(New Zealand) 2022	Did not qualify/No women's ODI status						
(India) 2025	Did not qualify						
Total	0/12	0 Titles	0	0	0	0	0

=== ICC Women's World T20 ===
Twenty20 World Cup Record
Year	Round	Position	GP	W	L	T	NR
(England) 2009	Did not qualify						
(Cricket West Indies) 2010	Did not qualify						
(Sri Lanka) 2012	Did not qualify						
(Bangladesh) 2014	Did not qualify						
(India) 2016	Did not qualify						
(Cricket West Indies) 2018	Did not qualify						
(Australia) 2020	Did not qualify						
(South Africa) 2023	Did not qualify						
(United Arab Emirates) 2024	Did not qualify						
(England) 2026	Did not qualify						
Total	0/8	0 Titles	0	0	0	0	0

=== ICC Women's T20 World Cup Qualifier ===
ICC Women's World Twenty20 Qualifier record
Year	Round	Position	GP	W	L	T	NR
(Republic of Ireland) 2013	Did not qualify						
(Thailand) 2015	Did not qualify						
(Netherlands) 2018	Did not qualify						
(Scotland) 2019	Did not qualify						
(United Arab Emirates) 2022	Did not qualify						
(United Arab Emirates) 2024	Did not qualify						
2026	Did not qualify						
Total	0/6	0 Titles	0	0	0	0	0

=== ICC Women's World Twenty20 Asia Qualifier ===
ICC Women's World Twenty20 Asia Qualifier record
Year	Round	Position	GP	W	L	T	NR
(Thailand) 2017	Did not participate						
(Thailand) 2019	Did not participate						
(United Arab Emirates) 2021	Group stages	–	5	1	4	0	0
(Malaysia) 2023	Group stages	–	5	1	3	0	1
(Thailand) 2025	Group stages	–	4	1	2	0	1
Total	3/4	0 Titles	14	3	9	0	2

=== ACC Women's Asia Cup ===
Women's Asia Cup Record
Year	Round	Position	GP	W	L	T	NR
2004 (Sri Lanka)	Did not enter (ODI format)						
2005-06 (Pakistan)	Did not enter (ODI format)						
2006 (India)	Did not enter (ODI format)						
2008 (Sri Lanka)	Did not enter (ODI format)						
2012 (China)	Did not qualify yet in the tournament						
2016 (Thailand)	Did not qualify yet in the tournament						
2018 (Malaysia)	Did not qualify yet in the tournament						
2022 (Bangladesh)	Did not qualify yet in the tournament						
2024 (Sri Lanka)	Did not qualify yet in the tournament						
Total	0/9	0 Titles	0	0	0	0	0

=== ACC Women's Premier Cup ===
ACC Women's Premier Cup record
Year	Round	Position	GP	W	L	T	NR
2024 (Malaysia)	Group stages	–	3	1	2	0	0
Total	1/1	0 Titles	3	1	2	0	0

=== ACC Women's T20 Championship ===
ACC Women's T20 Championship record
Year	Round	Position	GP	W	L	T	NR
2009 (Malaysia)	Group stages	9/12	6	2	4	0	0
(Kuwait) 2011 (Malaysia)	Group stages	8/10	5	1	4	0	0
(Thailand) 2013	Group stages	5/11	5	3	2	0	0
(Malaysia) 2022	Group stages	–	4	1	3	0	0
Total	4/4	0 Titles	20	7	13	0	0

== Records and statistics ==
International Match Summary — Bhutan Women

Last updated 6 June 2026

Playing Record
Format	M	W	L	T	NR	Inaugural Match
Twenty20 Internationals	43	12	31	0	0	26 April 2019

=== Twenty20 International ===
- Highest team total: 126/2 v. Bahrain on 22 June 2022 at UKM-YSD Cricket Oval, Bangi.
- Highest individual score: 78*, Ngawang Choden v. Malaysia on 24 January 2026 at Gelephu International Cricket Ground, Gelephu.
- Best innings bowling: 4/8, Dechen Wangmo v. Qatar on 1 September 2023 at Bayuemas Oval, Pandamaran.

T20I record versus other nations

Records complete to T20I #2823. Last updated 6 June 2026.

Opponent	M	W	L	T	NR	First match	First win
ICC Associate members
Bahrain	1	1	0	0	0	22 June 2022	22 June 2022
Hong Kong	8	0	8	0	0	13 January 2019	
Indonesia	4	1	3	0	0	14 January 2019	7 July 2024
Kuwait	4	2	2	0	0	22 November 2021	22 November 2021
Malaysia	5	3	2	0	0	28 November 2021	20 January 2026
Maldives	1	1	0	0	0	10 February 2024	10 February 2024
Myanmar	6	0	6	0	0	15 January 2019	
Nepal	5	0	5	0	0	23 November 2021	
Qatar	2	2	0	0	0	1 September 2023	1 September 2023
Singapore	3	2	1	0	0	3 July 2024	3 July 2024
Thailand	2	0	2	0	0	16 January 2019	
United Arab Emirates	2	0	2	0	0	25 November 2021	

== See also ==
- Bhutan men's national cricket team
- List of Bhutan women Twenty20 International cricketers
