= Iran women's national cricket team =

Cricket team

Iran
- Flag of Iran
- Association: Islamic Republic of Iran Cricket Association

Personnel
- Captain: Nasimeh Rahshetaei

International Cricket Council
- ICC status: Associate member (2017); Affiliate member (2003)
- ICC region: Asia
ICC Rankings	Current	Best-ever
T20I	---	

International cricket
- First international: v. Nepal at Bayuemas Oval, Kuala Lumpur; 3 July 2009
- As of 10 January 2023

The Iran national women's cricket team represents Iran in international women's cricket matches. The team made its international debut in 2009 and is organised by the Islamic Republic of Iran Cricket Association, which is an associate member of the International Cricket Council (ICC).

== History ==
Iran made its international debut when they played at the 2009 ACC Women's Twenty20 Championship, losing to Nepal on debut in July 2009. In 2012, the Wisden Cricketers' Almanack reported that women's cricket teams existed in eight of Iran's 31 provinces. The team later took part in the 2013 ACC Women's Championship, followed by the 2014 ACC Women's Premier.

In April 2018, the International Cricket Council (ICC) granted full Women's Twenty20 International (WT20I) status to all its members. Therefore, all Twenty20 matches played between Iran women and another international side after 1 July 2018 will be a full WT20I.

Nine women's teams competed in the 2022 National Women's Championship, with a national women's training camp held in the same year. The following year, it was reported that women's cricket in Iran faced a number of challenges, including a lack of suitable facilities and uncertainty around women's participation in sport following the Mahsa Amini protests.

== Tournament history ==
Host/Year	Round/Rank
(Malaysia) 2009 ACC Women's Twenty20 Championship	8th place
(Thailand) 2013 ACC Women's Championship	6th place
(Thailand) 2014 ACC Women's Premier	6th place

== Head coaches ==
- (Pakistan) Shamsa Hashmi 2008-2009
- (Pakistan) Hajira Sarwar 2010-2013
- (Iran) Mozhdeh Bavandpour 2014

== Captains ==
- Nahid Hakimian 2009
- Somayyeh Sahrapour 2013
- Nasimeh Rahshetaei 2014

== Awards ==
- 2012 Monir Habibi, Volunteer of the Year, Pepsi ICC Development Programme Awards
- 2013 Winners, Spirit of Cricket Award ACC Women's Championship

== Limited-overs head-to-head ==
Updated until last match played: 17 February 2014

- The result percentage excludes no results and counts ties as half a win

vs ICC Associate members
Opponent	M	W	L	T	NR	Win %
Hong Kong	1	0	1	0	0	0%
Kuwait	1	1	0	0	0	100%
Nepal	1	0	1	0	0	0%
Singapore	1	1	0	0	0	100%
Thailand	2	1	1	0	0	50%
vs ICC Affiliate members
Bhutan	2	0	2	0	0	0%
China	2	0	2	0	0	0%
Qatar	1	1	0	0	0	100%
Total	11	4	7	0	0	36%

== Twenty20 head-to-head ==
Updated until last match played: 10 July 2009

- The result percentage excludes no results and counts ties as half a win

vs ICC Associate members
Opponent	M	W	L	T	NR	Win %
Nepal	1	0	1	0	0	0%
Singapore	1	0	1	0	0	0%
Thailand	1	0	1	0	0	0%
United Arab Emirates	1	0	1	0	0	0%
vs ICC Affiliate members
Bhutan	1	1	0	0	0	100%
Qatar	1	0	1	0	0	0%
Total	6	1	5	0	0	17%

== See also ==
- Iran national cricket team
