= Nantanit Konchan =

Thai cricketer (born 1986)

Personal information
- Born: September 5, 1986 (age 39)
- Batting: Left-handed
- Bowling: Right arm off-break

International information
- National side: Thailand
- Source: Cricinfo, 11 January 2018

Nantanit Konchan (born 5 September 1986) is a Thai woman cricketer. She made her international debut at the 2009 ACC Women's Twenty20 Championship and also played for Thailand in the 2011 ACC Women's Twenty20 Championship.

She was also the member of the national team at the 2013 ICC Women's World Twenty20 Qualifier.
