= Oman women's national cricket team =

Cricket team

Oman
- Association: Oman Cricket

Personnel
- Captain: Priyanka Mendonca
- Coach: Damith Warusavithana

International Cricket Council
- ICC status: Associate member (2014); Affiliate member (2000)
- ICC region: Asia
ICC Rankings	Current	Best-ever
T20I	52nd	34th (6 Feb 2019)

T20 Internationals
- First T20I: v. Qatar at West End Park International Cricket Stadium, Doha; 17 January 2020
- Last T20I: v. Indonesia at ZJUT Cricket Field, Hangzhou; 23 August 2026
T20Is	Played	Won/Lost
Total	53	30/22 (0 ties, 1 no result)
This year	20	13/7 (0 ties, 0 no results)
T20I kit
- As of 23 August 2026

The Oman women's national cricket team represents the country of Oman in international women's cricket. The team is organised by Oman Cricket, which has been a member of the International Cricket Council (ICC) since 2000.

Oman made its international debut at the 2009 ACC Women's Twenty20 Championship in Malaysia. The team won only a single match in the group stage, against Kuwait, and were eventually ranked tenth after losing to Bhutan in the ninth-place play-off. At the tournament's 2011 edition, hosted by Kuwait, Oman failed to win even a single game. In December 2014, Oman hosted the inaugural edition of the Gulf Cooperation Council (GCC) Women's Twenty20 Championship, which was also contested by Kuwait, Qatar, and the United Arab Emirates. The team placed third at the tournament, ahead of Kuwait, and finished in the same position at the following year's tournament, which was held in Qatar.

In April 2018, the ICC granted full Women's Twenty20 International (WT20I) status to all its members. Therefore, all Twenty20 matches played between Oman women and other international sides after 1 July 2018 have full WT20I status. Oman played their first matches with WT20I status in January 2020 during a triangular series against Qatar and Kuwait, which was held in Doha.

== Records and statistics ==
International Match Summary — Oman Women

Last updated 23 August 2026

Playing Record
Format	M	W	L	T	NR	Inaugural Match
Twenty20 Internationals	53	30	22	0	1	17 January 2020

=== Twenty20 International ===
- Highest team total: 234/3 v. Saudi Arabia on 21 March 2022 at Oman Cricket Academy Ground Turf 2, Muscat.
- Highest individual score: 101*, Jayadhanyha Gunasekar v. Denmark on 6 February 2026 at Oman Cricket Academy Ground Turf 1, Al Amerat.
- Best individual bowling figures: 5/11, Amanda Dcosta v. Kuwait on 24 March 2022 at Oman Cricket Academy Ground Turf 1, Muscat.

T20I record versus other nations

Records complete to T20I #2962. Last updated 23 August 2026.

Opponent	M	W	L	T	NR	First match	First win
ICC Associate members
Bahrain	8	8	0	0	0	20 March 2022	20 March 2022
China	4	1	3	0	0	13 February 2024	3 June 2026
Denmark	4	4	0	0	0	3 February 2026	3 February 2026
Germany	4	0	4	0	0	4 February 2020	
Indonesia	3	0	3	0	0	10 June 2026	
Japan	1	0	1	0	0	10 February 2024	
Kuwait	5	3	2	0	0	17 January 2020	19 January 2020
Malaysia	1	0	1	0	0	22 June 2022	
Philippines	1	1	0	0	0	7 June 2026	7 June 2026
Qatar	12	10	2	0	0	17 January 2020	17 January 2020
Saudi Arabia	3	3	0	0	0	21 March 2022	21 March 2022
Singapore	1	0	1	0	0	20 June 2022	
United Arab Emirates	6	0	5	0	1	22 March 2022	22 March 2022

== Tournament history ==
=== ICC Women's T20 World Cup Qualifier ===
ICC Women's World Twenty20 Qualifier record
Year	Round	Position	GP	W	L	T	NR
(Republic of Ireland) 2013	Did not qualify						
(Thailand) 2015	Did not qualify						
(Netherlands) 2018	Did not qualify						
(Scotland) 2019	Did not qualify						
(United Arab Emirates) 2022	Did not qualify						
(United Arab Emirates) 2024	Did not qualify						
Total	0/6	0 Titles	0	0	0	0	0

=== ICC Women's World Twenty20 Asia Qualifier ===
ICC Women's World Twenty20 Asia Qualifier record
Year	Round	Position	GP	W	L	T	NR
(Thailand) 2017	Did not qualify						
(Thailand) 2019	Did not qualify						
(United Arab Emirates) 2021	Did not qualify						
(Malaysia) 2023	Did not qualify						
Total	0/4	0 Titles	0	0	0	0	0

=== Women's World Cup ===
World Cup record
Year	Round	Position	GP	W	L	T	NR
(England) 1973	Did not qualify/No ODI status yet						
(India) 1978	Did not qualify/No ODI status yet						
(New Zealand) 1982	Did not qualify/No ODI status yet						
(Australia) 1988	Did not qualify/No ODI status yet						
(England) 1993	Did not qualify/No ODI status yet						
(India) 1997	Did not qualify/No ODI status yet						
(New Zealand) 2000	Did not qualify/No ODI status yet						
(South Africa) 2005	Did not qualify/No ODI status yet						
(Australia) 2009	Did not qualify/No ODI status yet						
(India) 2013	Did not qualify/No ODI status yet						
(England) 2017	Did not qualify/No ODI status yet						
(New Zealand) 2022	Did not qualify/No ODI status yet						
(India) 2025	Did not qualify/No ODI status yet						
Total	0/13	0 Titles	0	0	0	0	0

=== Women's World T20 ===
Twenty20 World Cup Record
Year	Round	Position	GP	W	L	T	NR
(England) 2009	Did not qualify						
(Cricket West Indies) 2010	Did not qualify						
(Sri Lanka) 2012	Did not qualify						
(Bangladesh) 2014	Did not qualify						
(India) 2016	Did not qualify						
(Cricket West Indies) 2018	Did not qualify						
(Australia) 2020	Did not qualify						
(South Africa) 2023	Did not qualify						
(United Arab Emirates) 2024	Did not qualify						
Total	0/8	0 Titles	0	0	0	0	0

=== Women's Asia Cup ===
Women's Asia Cup record
Year	Round	Position	GP	W	L	T	NR
2004 (Sri Lanka)	Did not qualify (ODI format)						
2005-06 (Pakistan)	Did not qualify (ODI format)						
2006 (India)	Did not qualify (ODI format)						
2008 (Sri Lanka)	Did not qualify (ODI format)						
2012 (China)	Did not qualify						
2016 (Thailand)	Did not qualify						
2018 (Malaysia)	Did not qualify						
2022 (Bangladesh)	Did not qualify						
2024 (Sri Lanka)	Did not qualify						
Total	0/9	-	0	0	0	0	0

=== ACC Women's Premier Cup ===
ACC Women's Premier Cup record
Year	Round	Position	GP	W	L	T	NR
2024 (Malaysia)	Group stages	–	3	0	3	0	0
Total	1/1	0 Titles	3	0	3	0	0

=== ACC Women's T20 Championship ===
ACC Women's T20 Championship record
Year	Round	Position	GP	W	L	T	NR
2009 (Malaysia)	Group stages	10/12	5	1	4	0	0
(Kuwait) 2011 (Malaysia)	Group stages	10/10	4	0	4	0	0
(Thailand) 2013	Did not participate						
(Malaysia) 2022	Group stages	9/10	4	0	4	0	1
Total	3/4	0 Titles	13	1	11	0	1

== See also ==
- List of Oman women Twenty20 International cricketers
- Cricket in Oman
