= 2009 ACC Women's Twenty20 Championship =

- Dates: 3 – 11 July 2009
- Administrator: Asian Cricket Council
- Cricket format: 20-over
- Tournament format(s): Group stage, playoffs
- Host: Malaysia
- Champions: Hong Kong (1st title)
- Participants: 12
- Matches: 38
- Most runs: (Hong Kong) Neisha Pratt (230)
- Most wickets: (Nepal) Nary Thapa (14)

The 2009 ACC Women's Twenty20 Championship was an international women's cricket tournament held in Malaysia from 3 to 9 July 2009. It was the first women's tournament organised by the Asian Cricket Council (ACC) to feature the Twenty20 format of the sport.

Twelve teams participated in the tournament, including five that were making their international debuts (Bhutan, Iran, Kuwait, Oman, and Qatar). The teams were divided into two groups, one of which was topped by Thailand and the other by Hong Kong. Both of those teams eventually progressed to the final at Kinrara Academy Oval, where Hong Kong defeated Thailand by four runs in a cliffhanger to record their first ACC women's title. The losing semi-finalists, Nepal and China, played off for third place, with Nepal winning by 73 runs.

== Group stages ==
=== Group A ===
Team	Pld	W	L	NR	Pts	NRR
Thailand	5	5	0	0	10	+2.350
Nepal	5	4	1	0	8	+1.324
Singapore	5	3	2	0	6	+0.700
Iran	5	1	4	0	2	–1.466
Bhutan	5	1	4	0	2	–1.555
Qatar	5	1	4	0	2	–1.665
Source: CricketArchive

3 July
Scorecard

Nepal; 109/3 (20 overs)	v	Iran; 47 (15.4 overs)

Nepal won by 62 runs
Bayuemas Oval, Pandamaran
Player of the match: Neera Rajopadhyay (Nep)

3 July
Scorecard

Thailand; 100/5 (20 overs)	v	Singapore; 88 (19.4 overs)

Thailand won by 12 runs
Selangor Turf Club, Pandamaran
Player of the match: Somnarin Tippoch (Tha)

3 July
Scorecard

Bhutan; 109/9 (20 overs)	v	Qatar; 67 (13.1 overs)

Bhutan won by 42 runs
Kinrara Academy Oval, Bandar Kinrara
Player of the match: Safa Patel (Qat)

4 July
Scorecard

Nepal; 79/9 (20 overs)	v	Singapore; 79 (20 overs)

Match tied
Selangor Turf Club, Pandamaran
Player of the match: Rubina Chhetry (Nep)

- Nepal won the match through a bowl-out.

4 July
Scorecard

Thailand; 112/6 (20 overs)	v	Qatar; 62 (18 overs)

Thailand won by 50 runs
Bayuemas Oval, Pandamaran
Player of the match: Siwaporn Kosathong (Tha)

4 July
Scorecard

Iran; 140/6 (20 overs)	v	Bhutan; 121/4 (20 overs)

Iran won by 19 runs
Bayuemas Oval, Pandamaran
Player of the match: Nasimeh Rahshetaei (Iran)

5 July
Scorecard

Thailand; 122/5 (20 overs)	v	Bhutan; 39 (18.1 overs)

Thailand won by 83 runs
Bayuemas Oval, Pandamaran
Player of the match: Somnarin Tippoch (Tha)

5 July
Scorecard

Qatar; 43 (17.2 overs)	v	Nepal; 44/2 (9.1 overs)

Nepal won by 8 wickets
Kinrara Academy Oval, Bandar Kinrara
Player of the match: Sonu Khadka (Nep)

5 July
Scorecard

Singapore; 114/5 (20 overs)	v	Iran; 89 (20 overs)

Singapore won by 25 runs
Kinrara Academy Oval, Bandar Kinrara
Player of the match: Annapurna Mukherjee (Sin)

7 July
Scorecard

Bhutan; 31 (15.5 overs)	v	Nepal; 32/2 (8.4 overs)

Nepal won by 8 wickets
Bayuemas Oval, Pandamaran
Player of the match: Nary Thapa (Nep)

7 July
Scorecard

Thailand; 121/7 (20 overs)	v	Iran; 54 (11.3 overs)

Thailand won by 67 runs
Kinrara Academy Oval, Bandar Kinrara
Player of the match: Siwaporn Kosathong (Tha)

7 July
Scorecard

Singapore; 112/6 (20 overs)	v	Qatar; 89/6 (20 overs)

Singapore won by 23 runs
Bayuemas Oval, Pandamaran
Player of the match: G. K. Diviya (Sin)

8 July
Scorecard

Singapore; 112/4 (20 overs)	v	Bhutan; 78/6 (20 overs)

Singapore won by 34 runs
Bayuemas Oval, Pandamaran
Player of the match: Lakshmi Hariharan (Sin)

8 July
Scorecard

Thailand; 80/9 (20 overs)	v	Nepal; 57 (15.1 overs)

Thailand won by 23 runs
Kinrara Academy Oval, Bandar Kinrara
Player of the match: Thanapan Saisud (Tha)

8 July
Scorecard

Iran; 103/8 (20 overs)	v	Qatar; 104/3 (18.1 overs)

Qatar won by 7 wickets
Selangor Turf Club, Pandamaran
Player of the match: Nahan Arif (Qat)

=== Group B ===
Team	Pld	W	L	NR	Pts	NRR
Hong Kong	5	5	0	0	10	+5.170
China	5	4	1	0	8	+2.178
Malaysia	5	3	2	0	6	+0.364
United Arab Emirates	5	2	3	0	4	–0.161
Oman	5	1	4	0	2	–4.074
Kuwait	5	0	5	0	0	–2.571
Source: CricketArchive

3 July
Scorecard

Malaysia; 178/6 (20 overs)	v	Oman; 52 (16.5 overs)

Malaysia won by 126 runs
Kinrara Academy Oval, Bandar Kinrara
Player of the match: Winifred Duraisingam (Mal)

3 July
Scorecard

China; 142/5 (20 overs)	v	Kuwait; 53 (19 overs)

China won by 89 runs
Selangor Turf Club, Pandamaran
Player of the match: Sun Meng Yao (Chi)

3 July
Scorecard

UAE; 53/9 (20 overs)	v	Hong Kong; 56/1 (7 overs)

Hong Kong won by 9 wickets
Bayuemas Oval, Pandamaran
Player of the match: Godiva Li (HK)

4 July
Scorecard

Malaysia; 115/5 (20 overs)	v	UAE; 88/9 (20 overs)

Malaysia won by 27 runs
Kinrara Academy Oval, Bandar Kinrara
Player of the match: Arina Rahim (Mal)

4 July
Scorecard

China; 74/9 (20 overs)	v	Hong Kong; 76/0 (10.4 overs)

Hong Kong won by 10 wickets
Kinrara Academy Oval, Bandar Kinrara
Player of the match: Keenu Gill (HK)

4 July
Scorecard

Kuwait; 93/6 (20 overs)	v	Oman; 94/7 (19.3 overs)

Oman won by 3 wickets
Bayuemas Oval, Pandamaran
Player of the match: Kruti Toprani (Oman)

5 July
Scorecard

Malaysia; 45 (14.4 overs)	v	China; 46/2 (14.2 overs)

China won by 8 wickets
Selangor Turf Club, Pandamaran
Player of the match: Wang Meng (Chi)

5 July
Scorecard

Hong Kong; 168/2 (20 overs)	v	Kuwait; 64/9 (20 overs)

Hong Kong won by 104 runs
Bayuemas Oval, Pandamaran
Player of the match: Neisha Pratt (HK)

5 July
Scorecard

UAE; 141/6 (20 overs)	v	Oman; 92/2 (20 overs)

UAE won by 49 runs
Selangor Turf Club, Pandamaran
Player of the match: Natasha Cherriath (UAE)

7 July
Scorecard

Kuwait; 107/7 (20 overs)	v	Malaysia; 108/7 (19.3 overs)

Malaysia won by 3 wickets
Selangor Turf Club, Pandamaran
Player of the match: Winifred Duraisingam (Mal)

7 July
Scorecard

China; 108/3 (20 overs)	v	UAE; 77/9 (20 overs)

China won by 31 runs
Selangor Turf Club, Pandamaran
Player of the match: Sun Meng Yao (Chi)

7 July
Scorecard

Hong Kong; 166/2 (20 overs)	v	Oman; 30 (14.4 overs)

Hong Kong won by 136 runs
Kinrara Academy Oval, Bandar Kinrara
Player of the match: Connie Wong (HK)

8 July
Scorecard

Hong Kong; 160/1 (20 overs)	v	Malaysia; 68 (17.4 overs)

Hong Kong won by 92 runs
Selangor Turf Club, Pandamaran
Player of the match: Neisha Pratt (HK)

8 July
Scorecard

China; 159/2 (20 overs)	v	Oman; 60/9 (20 overs)

China won by 99 runs
Kinrara Academy Oval, Bandar Kinrara
Player of the match: Sun Huan (Chi)

8 July
Scorecard

UAE; 87 (20 overs)	v	Kuwait; 31 (17.5 overs)

UAE won by 56 runs
Kinrara Academy Oval, Bandar Kinrara
Player of the match: Priyada Murali (UAE)

== Finals ==
=== Semi-finals ===
10 July
Scorecard

Thailand; 115/2 (20 overs)	v	China; 88/9 (20 overs)

Thailand won by 27 runs
Kinrara Academy Oval, Bandar Kinrara
Player of the match: Somnarin Tippoch (Tha)

10 July
Scorecard

Nepal; 76/6 (20 overs)	v	Hong Kong; 79/3 (16.1 overs)

Hong Kong won by 7 wickets
Bayuemas Oval, Pandamaran
Player of the match: Connie Wong

=== Final ===
11 July
Scorecard

Hong Kong; 106/4 (20 overs)	v	Thailand; 102/4 (20 overs)

Hong Kong won by 4 runs
Kinrara Academy Oval, Bandar Kinrara
Player of the match: Keenu Gill (HK)

== Placement matches ==
=== 3rd-place play-off ===
11 July
Scorecard

Nepal; 103/5 (20 overs)	v	China; 30 (12.2 overs)

Nepal won by 73 runs
Kinrara Academy Oval, Bandar Kinrara
Player of the match: Nary Thapa (Nep)

=== 5th-place play-off ===
10 July
Scorecard

Malaysia; 114/6 (20 overs)	v	Singapore; 115/6 (18.5 overs)

Singapore won by 4 wickets
Selangor Turf Club, Pandamaran
Player of the match: Annapurna Mukherjee (Sin)

=== 7th-place play-off ===
10 July
Scorecard

UAE; 112/5 (20 overs)	v	Iran; 111/8 (20 overs)

UAE won by 1 run
Kinrara Academy Oval, Bandar Kinrara
Player of the match: Charvi Batt (UAE)

=== 9th-place play-off ===
11 July
Scorecard

Bhutan; 129/4 (20 overs)	v	Oman; 28 (13.5 overs)

Bhutan won by 101 runs
Bayuemas Oval, Pandamaran
Player of the match: Sonam Lhamo (Bhu)

=== 11th-place play-off ===
11 July
Scorecard

Kuwait; 101/8 (20 overs)	v	Qatar; 105/0 (12.3 overs)

Qatar won by 10 wickets
Selangor Turf Club, Pandamaran
Player of the match: Ishaani Mittal (Qat)

== Statistics ==
=== Most runs ===
The top five runscorers are included in this table, ranked by runs scored and then by batting average.

Player	Team	Runs	Inns	Avg	Highest	100s	50s
Neisha Pratt	Hong Kong	230	7	57.50	60*	0	2
Keenu Gill	Hong Kong	203	7	40.60	44	0	0
Sun Meng Yao	China	169	7	33.80	57*	0	1
Ishaani Mittal	Qatar	144	6	28.80	54*	0	1
Somnarin Tippoch	Thailand	143	7	23.83	37	0	0

Source: CricketArchive

=== Most wickets ===
The top five wicket takers are listed in this table, ranked by wickets taken and then by bowling average.

Player	Team	Overs	Wkts	Ave	SR	Econ	BBI
Nary Thapa	Nepal	16.0	14	2.42	6.85	2.12	5/5
Rekha Rewal	Nepal	22.1	14	4.78	9.50	3.02	3/5
Nantanit Konchan	Thailand	20.0	12	4.91	10.00	2.95	3/0
Thanapan Saisud	Thailand	21.5	12	6.16	10.91	3.38	4/8
G. K. Diviya	Singapore	23.0	11	6.63	12.54	3.17	4/10

Source: CricketArchive

== Final standing ==
Rank	Team
1	Hong Kong
2	Thailand
3	Nepal
4	China
5	Singapore
6	Malaysia
7	United Arab Emirates
8	Iran
9	Bhutan
10	Oman
11	Qatar
12	Kuwait
