= Yusrina Yaakop =

Malaysian cricketer (born 1993)

Personal information
- Full name: Yusrina Yaakop
- Born: 24 September 1993 (age 33)
- Batting: Right-handed

International information
- National side: Malaysia
- T20I debut (cap 10): 3 June 2018 v India
- Last T20I: 14 June 2023 v UAE

Career statistics
Competition	WT20I
Matches	31
Runs scored	233
Batting average	8.96
100s/50s	0/0
Top score	38
Catches/stumpings	6/–
Medal record
Representing Malaysia
Women's Cricket
Southeast Asian Games
Bronze medal – third place	2017 Kuala Lumpur	Twenty20
- Source: ESPNcricinfo, 8 October 2024

Yusrina Yaakop (born 24 September 1993) is a Malaysian cricketer. She made her Women's Twenty20 International (WT20I) debut for Malaysia on 3 June 2018, in the 2018 Women's Twenty20 Asia Cup. In April 2021, she was one of 15 players to be awarded a contract by the Malaysian Cricket Association, the first time female cricketers for the Malaysian team had been granted contracts.

In November 2021, she was named in Malaysia's side for the 2021 ICC Women's T20 World Cup Asia Qualifier tournament in the United Arab Emirates.
