= Singapore women's national cricket team =

Cricket team

Singapore
- Flag of Singapore
- Association: Singapore Cricket Association

Personnel
- Captain: Shafina Mahesh

International Cricket Council
- ICC status: Associate member (1974)
- ICC region: Asia
ICC Rankings	Current	Best-ever
T20I	70th	42nd (12 Feb 2023)

International cricket
- First international: v. Malaysia; 30 April 2006

T20 Internationals
- First T20I: v. Malaysia at Selangor Turf Club, Kuala Lumpur; 9 August 2019
- Last T20I: v. Kuwait at Selangor Turf Club, Kuala Lumpur; 6 June 2026
T20Is	Played	Won/Lost
Total	77	18/56 (0 ties, 3 no results)
This year	3	0/3 (0 ties, 0 no results)
- As of 6 June 2026

The Singapore women's national cricket team represents Singapore in international women's cricket matches. They played their first match against Malaysia on 30 April 2006 and lost by 58 runs.

In April 2018, the International Cricket Council (ICC) granted full Women's Twenty20 International (WT20I) status to all its members. Therefore, all Twenty20 matches played between Singapore women and another international side since 1 July 2018 have the full WT20I status. Singapore made their Twenty20 International debut in the 2018 Saudari Cup against Malaysia in August 2018, winning two matches out of a six-match series.

== Tournament history ==
=== Women's World Cup ===
World Cup record
Year	Round	Position	GP	W	L	T	NR
(England) 1973	Did not qualify/No women's ODI status						
(India) 1978	Did not qualify/No women's ODI status						
(New Zealand) 1982	Did not qualify/No women's ODI status						
(Australia) 1988	Did not qualify/No women's ODI status						
(England) 1993	Did not qualify/No women's ODI status						
(India) 1997	Did not qualify/No women's ODI status						
(New Zealand) 2000	Did not qualify/No women's ODI status						
(South Africa) 2005	Did not qualify/No women's ODI status						
(Australia) 2009	Did not qualify/No women's ODI status						
(India) 2013	Did not qualify/No women's ODI status						
(England) 2017	Did not qualify/No women's ODI status						
(New Zealand) 2022	Did not qualify/No women's ODI status						
(India) 2025	To be determined						
Total	0/12	0 Titles	0	0	0	0	0

=== Women's World T20 ===
Twenty20 World Cup Record
Year	Round	Position	GP	W	L	T	NR
(England) 2009	Did not qualify						
(Cricket West Indies) 2010	Did not qualify						
(Sri Lanka) 2012	Did not qualify						
(Bangladesh) 2014	Did not qualify						
(India) 2016	Did not qualify						
(Cricket West Indies) 2018	Did not qualify						
(Australia) 2020	Did not qualify						
(South Africa) 2023	Did not qualify						
(Bangladesh) 2024	Did not qualify						
Total	0/8	0 Titles	0	0	0	0	0

=== ICC Women's T20 World Cup Qualifier ===
ICC Women's World Twenty20 Qualifier record
Year	Round	Position	GP	W	L	T	NR
(Republic of Ireland) 2013	Did not qualify						
(Thailand) 2015	Did not qualify						
(Netherlands) 2018	Did not qualify						
(Scotland) 2019	Did not qualify						
(United Arab Emirates) 2022	Did not qualify						
(United Arab Emirates) 2024	Did not qualify						
Total	0/6	0 Titles	0	0	0	0	0

=== ICC Women's World Twenty20 Asia Qualifier ===
ICC Women's World Twenty20 Asia Qualifier record
Year	Round	Position	GP	W	L	T	NR
(Thailand) 2017	Did not qualify						
(Thailand) 2019	Did not qualify						
(United Arab Emirates) 2021	Did not qualify						
(Malaysia) 2023	Did not qualify						
Total	0/4	0 Titles	0	0	0	0	0

=== Women's Asia Cup ===
Women's Asia Cup Record
Year	Round	Position	GP	W	L	T	NR
2004 (Sri Lanka)	Did not enter (ODI format)						
2005-06 (Pakistan)	Did not enter (ODI format)						
2006 (India)	Did not enter (ODI format)						
2008 (Sri Lanka)	Did not enter (ODI format)						
2012 (China)	Did not qualify						
2016 (Thailand)	Did not qualify						
2018 (Malaysia)	Did not qualify						
2022 (Bangladesh)	Did not qualify						
2024 (Sri Lanka)	Did not qualify						
Total	0/9	0 Titles	0	0	0	0	0

=== ACC Women's Premier Cup ===
ACC Women's Premier Cup Record
Year	Round	Position	GP	W	L	T	NR
2024 (Malaysia)	Group stages	–	3	0	3	0	0
Total	1/1	0 Titles	3	0	3	0	0

=== ACC Women's T20 Championship ===
ACC Women's T20 Championship record
Year	Round	Position	GP	W	L	T	NR
2009 (Malaysia)	Group stages	5/12	5	3	2	0	0
(Kuwait) 2011 (Malaysia)	Group stages	6/10	4	2	2	0	0
(Thailand) 2013	Group stages	9/10	5	1	4	0	0
(Malaysia) 2022	Group stages	–	4	1	3	0	0
Total	3/4	0 Titles	18	7	11	0	0

== Current squad ==
This lists all the players who played for Singapore in the past 12 months or were named in the most recent squad.

Name	Age	Batting style	Bowling style	Notes
Batters
Roshni Seth	26	Right-handed	Right-arm medium	Vice-Captain
Devika Galia	29	Right-handed		
Sara Merican		Left-handed	Right-arm medium	
Smriti Anand	22	Right-handed	Right-arm off spin	
Rachel Gnanaraj	31	Right-handed	Right-arm medium	
All-rounders
GK Diviya	39	Right-handed	Right-arm off spin	
Shafina Mahesh	26	Right-handed	Right-arm medium	Captain
Vinu Kumar	40	Right-handed	Right-arm medium	
Ada Bhasin	19	Right-handed	Right-arm medium	
Riyaa Bhasin	19	Right-handed	Right-arm medium	
Ishita Shukla	20	Right-handed	Right-arm medium	
Laasya Bommareddy	18	Right-handed	Right-arm medium	
Wicket-keeper
Piumi Gurusunghe	40	Right-handed		
Spin Bowler
Johanna Pooranakaran	21	Right-handed	Right-arm leg spin	
Pace Bowlers
Dhavina Haresh	20	Right-handed	Right-arm medium	
Charlotte Boyle	17	Right-handed	Right-arm medium	
Ella Ungerman	17	Right-handed	Right-arm medium	

Updated as on 29 Oct 2024

== Records and statistics ==
International Match Summary — Singapore Women

Last updated 6 June 2026

Playing Record
Format	M	W	L	T	NR	Inaugural Match
Twenty20 Internationals	77	18	56	0	3	9 August 2018

=== Twenty20 International ===
- Highest team total: 224/4 v Philippines on 27 December 2023 at Friendship Oval, Dasmariñas.
- Highest individual score: 92*, Shafina Mahesh v Philippines on 27 December 2023 at Friendship Oval, Dasmariñas.
- Best individual bowling figures: 5/6, Abu Bhasin v Cambodia on 8 February 2023 at Morodok Techo National Stadium, Phnom Penh.

T20I record versus other nations

Records complete to WT20I #2826. Last updated 6 June 2026.

Opponent	M	W	L	T	NR	First match	First win
ICC Associate members
Bhutan	3	1	2	0	0	3 July 2024	6 July 2024
Cambodia	9	9	0	0	0	8 February 2023	8 February 2023
Indonesia	14	0	13	0	1	4 November 2022	
Japan	5	0	5	0	0	1 October 2024	
Kuwait	5	0	5	0	0	10 February 2024	
Malaysia	15	2	13	0	0	9 August 2018	10 August 2018
Myanmar	14	0	13	0	1	18 April 2019	
Oman	1	1	0	0	0	20 June 2022	20 June 2022
Philippines	7	5	1	0	1	27 December 2023	27 December 2023
Qatar	1	0	1	0	0	21 June 2022	
Thailand	2	0	2	0	0	13 February 2024	
United Arab Emirates	1	0	1	0	0	18 June 2022	

== See also ==
- List of Singapore women Twenty20 International cricketers
