= List of Singapore women Twenty20 International cricketers =

This is a list of Singapore women Twenty20 International cricketers. A Twenty20 International is an international cricket match between two representative teams. A Twenty20 International is played under the rules of Twenty20 cricket. In April 2018, the International Cricket Council (ICC) granted full international status to Twenty20 women's matches played between member sides from 1 July 2018 onwards.

The list is arranged in the order in which each player won her first Twenty20 cap. Where more than one player won her first Twenty20 cap in the same match, their surnames are listed alphabetically.

== Key ==
General

- ‡ – Captain
- † – Wicket-keeper
- First – Year of debut
- Last – Year of latest game
- Mat – Number of matches played

Batting

- Runs – Runs scored in career
- HS – Highest score
- Avg – Runs scored per dismissal
- * – Batsman remained not out
- 50 – Number of half centuries

Bowling

- Wkt – Wickets taken in career
- BBI – Best bowling in an innings
- Ave – Average runs per wicket

Fielding

- Ca – Catches taken
- St – Stumpings affected

== List of players ==
Statistics are correct as of 6 June 2026.

General					Batting				Bowling				Fielding		Ref
No.	Name	First	Last	Mat	Runs	HS	Avg	50	Balls	Wkt	BBI	Ave	Ca	St	Ref
1	Rajeshwari Butler	2018	2019	7	90	35*	15.00	0	6	0	–	–	1	0	
2	Alow Ci Hui	2018	2019	8	5	4*	–	0	144	6	2/15	28.66	0	0	
3	Haresh Dhavina	2018	2026	57	109	34*	4.95	0	931	30	3/17	28.96	0	0	
4	Diviya G K‡	2019	2025	62	784	77*	17.81	1	1,144	50	4/14	15.12	9	0	
5	Neisha Pratt	2018	2018	5	91	48	18.20	0	–	–	–	–	1	0	
6	Samantha Singham†	2018	2019	7	89	26*	17.80	0	–	–	–	–	2	0	
7	Roshni Seth	2018	2026	58	759	70	15.18	3	476	20	4/14	23.35	18	0	
8	Shafia Hassan	2018	2019	9	7	5	3.50	0	198	3	1/23	63.33	0	0	
9	Shafina Mahesh‡†	2018	2026	70	843	92*	14.05	3	886	37	4/2	24.75	21	2	
10	Vathana Sreemurugavel	2018	2024	19	106	16	7.57	0	3	0	–	–	1	0	
11	Toh Wang Ling	2018	2019	9	5	4*	–	0	102	2	2/28	74.00	1	0	
12	Ramandeep Chetan	2018	2018	4	24	14	6.25	0	–	–	–	–	1	0	
13	Jacinta Si Ping†	2018	2025	30	26	12	2.60	0	–	–	–	–	4	2	
14	Nandita Sharma	2018	2019	3	0	0	0.00	0	6	0	–	–	0	0	
15	Vigineswari Pasupathy	2018	2022	6	35	10	7.00	0	–	–	–	–	0	0	
16	Amna Jamal	2019	2019	4	7	4	3.50	0	–	–	–	–	0	0	
17	Lucky Gautam	2019	2019	1	3	3	3.00	0	–	–	–	–	0	0	
18	Piumi Gurusinghe†	2019	2026	43	203	20*	6.34	0	–	–	–	–	8	3	
19	Swati Kapila	2019	2019	1	0	0	0.00	0	–	–	–	–	0	0	
20	Smruthi Radhakrishnan	2019	2019	6	27	18	5.40	0	95	2	1/19	54.00	0	0	
21	Ishita Shukla	2019	2024	19	24	5*	2.40	0	187	11	3/14	19.54	5	0	
22	Sanika Sonpethkar	2019	2019	2	0	0	0.00	0	24	0	–	–	0	0	
23	Chathurani Abeyratne	2022	2025	17	27	5	2.07	0	132	2	1/20	96.00	1	0	
24	Ada Bhasin†	2022	2025	41	267	50*	9.88	1	709	37	5/6	14.62	13	0	
25	Damini Ramesh	2022	2024	23	16	3*	2.00	0	277	13	3/10	19.15	7	0	
26	Johanna Pooranakaran	2022	2025	43	15	5*	1.00	0	518	20	2/10	30.35	6	0	
27	Vinu Kumar	2022	2026	53	648	53	14.08	1	588	29	3/8	18.58	11	0	
28	Zay Hua Tan	2022	2023	10	25	9	3.12	0	–	–	–	–	0	0	
29	Riyaa Bhasin†	2022	2026	31	104	11*	5.20	0	162	7	2/0	29.28	6	0	
30	Jocelyn Pooranakaran	2022	2025	23	21	8*	2.62	0	102	4	3/9	40.25	3	0	
31	Ananyapriya Venkata	2022	2022	1	2	2	2.00	0	–	–	–	–	0	0	
32	Dhwani Prakas†	2022	2023	7	3	2	0.75	0	18	3	3/10	3.33	1	0	
33	Kamal Raja	2022	2025	10	4	3	0.57	0	–	–	–	–	1	0	
34	Sahana Iyer	2022	2022	3	3	3*	3.00	0	–	–	–	–	0	0	
35	Tanvi Prasad	2022	2022	3	2	2	0.66	0	–	–	–	–	0	0	
36	Devika Galia	2023	2026	30	216	45	8.64	0	18	0	–	–	3	0	
37	Sara Merican	2023	2025	26	51	14	3.00	0	–	–	–	–	1	0	
38	Pin Goh	2023	2023	2	1	1	1.00	0	–	–	–	–	0	0	
39	Ananya Sarma	2023	2025	14	18	7	1.63	0	–	–	–	–	0	0	
40	Roma Raval	2023	2025	3	–	–	–	0	6	0	–	–	0	0	
41	Laasya Bommareddy	2024	2026	24	77	17*	7.00	0	162	6	4/14	31.33	5	0	
42	Charlotte Boyle	2024	2024	8	5	2*	1.66	0	114	3	2/20	39.33	1	0	
43	Ella Ungerman	2024	2026	18	12	4*	4.00	0	222	13	4/11	16.84	1	0	
44	Smriti Anand	2024	2024	3	28	15	14.00	0	18	0	–	–	0	0	
45	Rachel Gnanaraj	2024	2024	8	76	23	9.50	0	18	1	1/18	31.00	3	0	
46	Anushka Tomar	2024	2026	6	31	19	5.16	0	–	–	–	–	0	0	
47	Aarsheya Sharma	2024	2024	1	0	0	0.00	0	–	–	–	–	0	0	
48	Jenissa Jain	2025	2025	3	0	0	0.00	0	–	–	–	–	0	0	
49	Pushpa Murali	2025	2025	2	1	1	0.50	0	–	–	–	–	0	0	
50	Rashmeka Badri Narayanan	2026	2026	3	3	3	1.00	0	54	1	1/19	53.00	0	0	
