= Keenu Gill =

Hong Kong cricketer (born 1990)

Personal information
- Full name: Kanwardeep Keenu Gill
- Born: 8 July 1990 (age 36); Hong Kong
- Batting: Right-handed
- Bowling: Right-arm medium

International information
- National side: Hong Kong

Domestic team information
- Years: Team
- ??: Kowloon Cricket Club Maidens
- Source: Cricinfo, 22 March 2016

Kanwardeep Keenu Gill (born 8 July 1990) is a Hong Kong women's cricketer. She is an all-rounder, has captained the side, and has played domestic cricket for Kowloon Cricket Club Maidens.

== Career ==
Gill played in Hong Kong's first match, against Pakistan. During the 2007 Asian Cricket Council 30-over tournament in Malaysia, Gill top scored with 10 from 41 balls in a match against Nepal; Hong Kong scored only 31 runs, and lost by 7 wickets. In October 2007, Gill was named vice-captain of the Hong Kong team at the age of 17. In a 2008 Asian Cricket Council Under-19s Women's Championship match, Gill took 5 wickets for 3 runs in 4.3 overs in a match against the UAE; the UAE were bowled out for 60, and Gill then scored 28 runs from 22 balls. She won a player of the match award in a 2009 match against Pakistan despite being on the losing team; Gill took 2/18 and scored 75 runs in the match. In the 2010/11 season, Gill scored 201* in an innings; as of 2016, only 4 women have scored a double century in matches in Hong Kong.

In 2012, Gill and Connie Wong withdrew from the Hong Kong squad for the 2012 Asian Cricket Council Women's Twenty20 Asia Cup in protest of new eligibility rules that made Neisha Pratt ineligible to play for Hong Kong. Both players were subsequently banned from playing for a year. As a result of her suspension, Gill missed the 2014 Asian Games qualifying tournament, during which Hong Kong qualified for the main tournament. Gill played for Hong Kong in the Games' main tournament; in the first group match against China she scored 45*, and in the second group match she top scored with 33. In the quarter-final match against Sri Lanka, Gill again top scored with 16, as Hong Kong scored just 67. She had previously also played for Hong Kong at the 2010 Asian Games.

In 2015/16, she played for Kowloon Cricket Club Maidens; in a Twenty20 match against DIASQUA Little Sai Wan Cricket Club Wasps (DLSW Wasps), Gill scored 40 runs in a match winning opening partnership of 77 with Sidra Nasreen.
