= Connie Wong =

Hong Kong women's cricketer

Personal information
- Full name: Connie Wong
- Born: 3 April 1977 (age 49); Hong Kong
- Batting: Right-handed
- Bowling: Right-arm medium

International information
- National side: Hong Kong

Domestic team information
- Years: Team
- 2001/02–2004/05: Western Fury

Career statistics
Competition	List A
Matches	20
Runs scored	56
Batting average	6.22
100s/50s	0/0
Top score	18*
Balls bowled	821
Wickets	17
Bowling average	34.17
5 wickets in innings	0
10 wickets in match	0
Best bowling	3/47
Catches/stumpings	4/–
- Source: CricketArchive, 3 May 2016

Connie Wong (born 3 April 1977) is a Hong Kong women's cricketer. She has captained the side, and has played domestic cricket for Western Fury in the Women's National Cricket League.

== Career ==
Wong made her debut for Hong Kong in a 2007/08 series against Bangladesh; Wong scored 4 from 32 balls, and took 0/8 from 4 overs. She was part of the team that won the 2011 ACC Women’s Twenty20 Championship; in the final, Wong scored 18 in a second-wicket partnership of 36 with Neisha Pratt. Wong captained Hong Kong at the 2012 Asia Women’s Cricket Twenty 20 Cricket Tournament.

In 2012, Wong and Keenu Gill withdrew from the Hong Kong squad for the 2012 Asian Cricket Council Women's Twenty20 Asia Cup in protest of new eligibility rules that made Neisha Pratt ineligible to play for Hong Kong. Both players were subsequently banned from playing for a year.
