= 2020 Qatar Women's T20I Triangular Series =

International cricket tour

2020 Qatar Women's Tri-Nation Series
- Date: 17–21 January 2020
- Location: Qatar
- Result: Kuwait won the series
Teams
Kuwait	Oman	Qatar
Captains
Amna Tariq	Vaishali Jesrani	Aysha
Most runs
Priyada Murali (126)	Sakshi Shetty (115)	Aysha (102)
Most wickets
Maria Jasvi (6)	Bhakti Shetty (8)	Nahan Arif (5)

The 2020 Qatar Women's T20I Triangular Series was a women's Twenty20 International (WT20I) cricket tournament that took place at the West End Park International Cricket Stadium in Doha, Qatar from 17 to 21 January 2020. Matches in the series had official WT20I games as per ICC's announcement that full WT20I status would apply to all the matches played between women's teams of associate members after 1 July 2018. Qatar and Oman both made their WT20I debut in the opening match the tournament.

The participants were originally announced to be the women's national sides of Qatar, China, Kuwait and Oman, playing in a quadrangular round-robin event followed by semi-finals and a final. However, on the first day of the event, the tournament was changed to a triangular series with China withdrawn at short notice and a new schedule was announced.

Oman booked their place in the final on day two and were joined by Kuwait the following day. Kuwait recovered from losing to Oman in the last round-robin match by defeating the same opponents in the final by a comfortable margin of 7 wickets.

== Squads ==
Kuwait	Oman	Qatar
Amna Tariq (c); Dalal Al-Ghofran; Nourah Alhotti; Maryyam Ashraf; Mufida Bano; Aakriti Bose; Suchitha D'sa; Raelyn D'Souza; Siobhan Gomez; Aaliya Hussain; Mariamma Hyder; Maria Jasvi; Zeefa Jilani; Priyada Murali; Ayeesha Yasmeen; Madeeha Zuberi	Vaishali Jesrani (c); Fiza Javed (vc); Javed Hina; Javed Hira; Nikhita Jagadish; Sameera Khan; Priyanka Mendonca; Snehal Nair; Ananya Shetty; Bhakti Shetty; Sakshi Shetty; Anshita Tiwari; Yashika Verma; Sani-e-Zehra	Aysha (c); Shahreen Bahadur (vc); Nahan Arif; Saachi Dhadwal; Khadija Imtiaz; Trupti Kale; Aleena Khan; Angeline Mare; Sabah Nawab; Rochelle Quyn; Aisha Rahman; Akshata Sanguelkar; Sincy Sherin; Apsara Weerasekara

== Round-robin ==
=== Points table ===
Team	P	W	L	T	NR	Pts	NRR
Oman	4	3	1	0	0	6	+0.777
Kuwait	4	2	2	0	0	4	+0.179
Qatar	4	1	3	0	0	2	–0.966

=== Matches ===
17 January 2020
13:00
Scorecard

Oman; 114/3 (20 overs)	v	Qatar; 111/6 (20 overs)
Fiza 34* (34); Nahan Arif 1/16 (4 overs)		Aysha 27* (23); Bhakti Shetty 2/15 (2 overs)

Oman won by 3 runs
West End Park International Cricket Stadium, Doha
Umpires: Naveen D'Souza (Kuw) and Mohammad Nasim (Qat)
Player of the match: Fiza (Oma)

- Qatar won the toss and elected to field.
- Nahan Arif, Aysha, Shahreen Bahadur, Saachi Dhadwal, Khadija Imtiaz, Trupti Kale, Aleena Khan, Angeline Mare, Rochelle Quyn, Aisha Rahman, Akshata Sanguelkar (Qat), Fiza, Javed Hina, Javed Hira, Nikhita Jagadish, Vaishali Jesrani, Sameera Khan, Priyanka Mendonca, Snehal Nair, Bhakti Shetty, Sakshi Shetty and Yashika Verma (Oma) all made their WT20I debuts.

17 January 2020
17:30 (D/N)
Scorecard

Kuwait; 115/7 (20 overs)	v	Qatar; 119/9 (19.5 overs)
Zeefa Jilani 24 (32); Rochelle Quyn 2/19 (4 overs)		Aysha 31 (28); Maria Jasvi 2/16 (4 overs)

Qatar won by 1 wicket
West End Park International Cricket Stadium, Doha
Umpires: Mohammad Nasim (Qat) and Abdul Salam (Qat)
Player of the match: Aleena Khan (Qat)

- Qatar won the toss and elected to field.
- Sabah Nawab (Qat), Aakriti Bose, Raelyn D'Souza and Ayeesha Yasmeen (Kuw) all made their WT20I debuts.

18 January 2020
10:00
Scorecard

Oman; 113/6 (20 overs)	v	Kuwait; 117/2 (19.5 overs)
Vaishali Jesrani 26 (39); Sakshi Shetty 26 (39); Maria Jasvi 1/18 (4 overs)		Zeefa Jilani 40 (51); Bhakti Shetty 2/23 (3.5 overs)

Kuwait won by 8 wickets
West End Park International Cricket Stadium, Doha
Umpires: Prassanna Haran (Qat) and Abdul Salam (Qat)
Player of the match: Zeefa Jilani (Kuw)

- Kuwait won the toss and elected to field.

18 January 2020
15:00 (D/N)
Scorecard

Oman; 130/6 (20 overs)	v	Qatar; 69 (19.3 overs)
Sakshi Shetty 44 (54); Shahreen Bahadur 2/5 (1 over)		Aysha 18 (17); Priyanca Mendonca 3/15 (4 overs)

Oman won by 61 runs
West End Park International Cricket Stadium, Doha
Umpires: Riyaz Kurupkar (Qat) and Muhammad Usman (Qat)
Player of the match: Sakshi Shetty (Oma)

- Oman won the toss and elected to bat.

19 January 2020
10:00
Scorecard

Qatar; 79/6 (20 overs)	v	Kuwait; 80/3 (17 overs)
Aysha 26 (46); Mariamma Hyder 1/7 (4 overs)		Priyada Murali 20 (29); Akshata Sanguelkar 1/8 (4 overs)

Kuwait won by 7 wickets
West End Park International Cricket Stadium, Doha
Umpires: Naveen D'Souza (Kuw) and Abdul Jabbar (Qat)
Player of the match: Maria Jasvi (Kuw)

- Kuwait won the toss and elected to field.

19 January 2020
15:00 (D/N)
Scorecard

Oman; 108/5 (20 overs)	v	Kuwait; 105 (19.5 overs)
Priyanka Mendonca 32 (31); Madeeha Zuberi 2/16 (4 overs)		Priyada Murali 31 (31); Anshita Tiwari 3/8 (3 overs)

Oman won by 3 runs
West End Park International Cricket Stadium, Doha
Umpires: Riyaz Kurupkar (Qat) and Muhammad Usman (Qat)
Player of the match: Anshita Tiwari (Oma)

- Oman won the toss and elected to bat.
- Anshita Tiwari and Sani Zehra (Oma) both made their WT20I debuts.

== Final ==
21 January 2020
15:30
Scorecard

Oman; 93/6 (20 overs)	v	Kuwait; 94/3 (16.5 overs)
Sakshi Shetty 19 (32); Mariamma Hyder 2/16 (4 overs)		Priyada Murali 35 (40); Yashika Verma 1/13 (3 overs)

Kuwait won by 7 wickets
West End Park International Cricket Stadium, Doha
Umpires: Prasanna Haran and Muhammad Usman (Qat)
Player of the match: Priyada Murali (Kuw)

- Oman won the toss and elected to bat.
