= 2021 Women's T20 World Cup Asia Qualifier =

International cricket tournament

2021 ICC Women's T20 World Cup Asia Qualifier
- Dates: 22 – 28 November 2021
- Administrator: International Cricket Council
- Cricket format: Twenty20 International
- Host: United Arab Emirates
- Champions: United Arab Emirates
- Runners-up: Hong Kong
- Participants: 6
- Matches: 15
- Player of the series: (Nepal) Sita Rana Magar
- Most runs: (United Arab Emirates) Theertha Satish (165)
- Most wickets: (United Arab Emirates) Khushi Sharma (10)

The 2021 ICC Women's T20 World Cup Asia Qualifier was a cricket tournament that took place in the United Arab Emirates in November 2021. The matches were played with Women's Twenty20 International (WT20I) status, with the top team progressing to the 2022 ICC Women's T20 World Cup Qualifier tournament. Bhutan and Myanmar were originally scheduled to make their debuts at an ICC women's event. Originally scheduled to take place in September 2021, the tournament was postponed in May 2021 due to the COVID-19 pandemic.

Nepal's preparations included a three-match WT20I series against Qatar in Doha the week before the qualifier, which Nepal won 3–0. Bhutan and the United Arab Emirates scheduled two warm-up matches against each other in Ajman. The second match of the tournament, between Hong Kong and Nepal, was the 1,000th WT20I to be played. The United Arab Emirates won the tournament, winning all five of their matches, progressing to the World Cup Qualifier. Nepal's Sita Rana Magar was named as the player of the tournament.

== Squads ==
The following teams competed in the tournament:

Bhutan	Hong Kong	Kuwait	Malaysia	Nepal	United Arab Emirates
Yeshey Choden (c); Tashi Cheki; Ngawang Choden; Sonam Choden; Karma Dema; Anju Gurung; Sonam Paldon (wk); Karma Samten; Pema Seldon (wk); Dechen Wangmo; Yeshey Wangmo; Tshering Yangchen; Somsel Yangzom; Tshering Zangmo	Kary Chan (c); Maryam Bibi; Betty Chan; Hiu Ying Cheung (wk); Tammy Chu; Yasmin Daswani; Mariko Hill; Emma Lai; Heiley Lui; Natasha Miles; Iqra Sahar; Shanzeen Shahzad; Alison Siu; Ruchitha Venkatesh	Amna Tariq (c); Aakriti Bose (wk); Venora D'Souza; Siobhan Gomez; Aaliya Hussain; Mariamma Hyder; Maria Jasvi; Zeefa Jilani; Khadija Khalil; Glenda Menezes; Priyada Murali; Maryam Omar; Balasubramani Shanti; Rida Zainab	Winifred Duraisingam (c); Nik Nur Atiela; Aisya Eleesa; Mas Elysa; Ainna Hamizah Hashim; Elsa Hunter; Mahirah Izzati Ismail; Wan Julia (wk); Nur Arianna Natsya; Nur Natasya Nazira; Amalin Sorfina; Yusrina Yaakop; Noor Hayati Zakaria; Wan Nor Zulaika	Rubina Chhetry (c); Indu Barma (vc); Apsari Begam; Karuna Bhandari; Dolly Bhatta; Kabita Joshi; Saraswati Kumari; Kabita Kunwar; Sarita Magar; Sita Magar; Jyoti Pandey (wk); Sangita Rai; Sabnam Rai; Kajal Shrestha (wk)	Chaya Mughal (c); Natasha Cherriath; Samaira Dharnidharka; Kavisha Egodage; Mahika Gaur; Priyanjali Jain; Suraksha Kotte; Vaishnave Mahesh; Esha Oza; Judit Peter (wk); Theertha Satish; Chamani Seneviratne; Khushi Sharma; Shubha Venkataraman

== Points table ==
Pos	Team	Pld	W	L	NR	Pts	NRR
1	United Arab Emirates	5	5	0	0	10	2.366
2	Hong Kong	5	4	1	0	8	0.726
3	Nepal	5	3	2	0	6	1.028
4	Malaysia	5	2	3	0	4	0.399
5	Bhutan	5	1	4	0	2	−1.038
6	Kuwait	5	0	5	0	0	−3.928

Source: ESPN Cricinfo

advanced to the global qualifier

== Fixtures ==
22 November 2021
09:30
Scorecard

United Arab Emirates; 131/4 (20 overs)	v	Malaysia; 101/2 (20 overs)
Theertha Satish 46 (48); Mahirah Izzati Ismail 2/20 (3 overs)		Wan Julia 44 (50); Kavisha Egodage 1/18 (4 overs)

United Arab Emirates won by 30 runs
ICC Academy Ground, Dubai
Umpires: Ahsan Raza (Pak) and Durga Subedi (Nep)
Player of the match: Theertha Satish (UAE)

- Malaysia won the toss and elected to field.
- Natasha Cherriath, Priyanjali Jain, Theertha Satish and Khushi Sharma (UAE) all made their WT20I debuts.

22 November 2021
09:30
Scorecard

Nepal; 104/3 (20 overs)	v	Hong Kong; 105/4 (18 overs)
Sita Rana Magar 40* (58); Betty Chan 1/12 (4 overs)		Mariko Hill 42* (38); Sabnam Rai 1/14 (2 overs)

Hong Kong won by 6 wickets
ICC Academy Ground 2, Dubai
Umpires: Akbar Ali (UAE) and Vinod Babu (Oma)
Player of the match: Mariko Hill (HK)

- Hong Kong won the toss and elected to field.
- Natasha Miles and Iqra Sahar (HK) both made their WT20I debuts.

22 November 2021
13:30
Scorecard

Bhutan; 114/6 (20 overs)	v	Kuwait; 74 (19.3 overs)
Tshering Zangmo 34* (36); Khadija Khalil 1/6 (1 over)		Maryam Omar 29 (34); Karma Samten 2/9 (3.3 overs)

Bhutan won by 40 runs
ICC Academy Ground, Dubai
Umpires: Rahul Asher (Oma) and Vinay Kumar Jha (Nep)
Player of the match: Tshering Zangmo (Bhu)

- Kuwait won the toss and elected to field.
- Karma Samten (Bhu), Glenda Menezes, Balasubramani Shanti and Rida Zainab (Kuw) all made their WT20I debuts.
- Rida Zainab (Kuw) was replaced by Glenda Menezes at the start of the Kuwait innings.

23 November 2021
09:30
Scorecard

United Arab Emirates; 128/7 (20 overs)	v	Hong Kong; 117 (20 overs)
Kavisha Egodage 28 (35); Kary Chan 3/23 (4 overs)		Natasha Miles 37 (37); Chaya Mughal 2/14 (3 overs)

United Arab Emirates won by 11 runs
ICC Academy Ground, Dubai
Umpires: Vinod Babu (Oma) and Durga Subedi (Nep)
Player of the match: Chaya Mughal (UAE)

- Hong Kong won the toss and elected to field.

23 November 2021
13:30
Scorecard

Malaysia; 161/3 (20 overs)	v	Kuwait; 80 (20 overs)
Winifred Duraisingam 44 (40); Mariamma Hyder 1/23 (4 overs)		Priyada Murali 34 (40); Mas Elysa 2/12 (3 overs)

Malaysia won by 81 runs
ICC Academy Ground, Dubai
Umpires: Akbar Ali (UAE) and Vinay Kumar Jha (Nep)
Player of the match: Mas Elysa (Mas)

- Malaysia won the toss and elected to bat.
- Venora D'Souza (Kuw) made her WT20I debut.

23 November 2021
13:30
Scorecard

Bhutan; 61/6 (20 overs)	v	Nepal; 64/2 (8.3 overs)
Ngawang Choden 13 (31); Sita Rana Magar 3/10 (4 overs)		Indu Barma 18* (24); Tashi Cheki 1/21 (2.3 overs)

Nepal won by 8 wickets
ICC Academy Ground 2, Dubai
Umpires: Ahsan Raza (Pak) and Rahul Asher (Oma)
Player of the match: Sita Rana Magar (Nep)

- Bhutan won the toss and elected to bat.
- Tashi Cheki (Bhu) made her WT20I debut.

25 November 2021
09:30
Scorecard

Malaysia; 101/5 (20 overs)	v	Hong Kong; 102/6 (17.4 overs)
Mas Elysa 38 (49); Kary Chan 2/9 (3 overs)		Kary Chan 38* (40); Nik Nur Atiela 2/13 (3 overs)

Hong Kong won by 4 wickets
ICC Academy Ground 2, Dubai
Umpires: Akbar Ali (UAE) and Durga Subedi (Nep)
Player of the match: Kary Chan (HK)

- Hong Kong won the toss and elected to field.

25 November 2021
09:30
Scorecard

Kuwait; 27 (15.4 overs)	v	Nepal; 28/1 (3.3 overs)
Priyada Murali 10 (20); Sangita Rai 3/2 (2.4 overs)		Indu Barma 13* (8); Maria Jasvi 1/15 (2 overs)

Nepal won by 9 wickets
ICC Academy Ground, Dubai
Umpires: Rahul Asher (Oma) and Vinod Babu (Oma)
Player of the match: Rubina Chhetry (Nep)

- Kuwait won the toss and elected to bat.

25 November 2021
13:30
Scorecard

United Arab Emirates; 149/2 (20 overs)	v	Bhutan; 102/9 (20 overs)
Theertha Satish 64* (53); Anju Gurung 2/25 (4 overs)		Sonam Paldon 26 (41); Khushi Sharma 5/22 (4 overs)

United Arab Emirates won by 47 runs
ICC Academy Ground 2, Dubai
Umpires: Vinay Kumar Jha (Nep) and Ahsan Raza (Pak)
Player of the match: Khushi Sharma (UAE)

- Bhutan won the toss and elected to field.

26 November 2021
09:30
Scorecard

Malaysia; 92/7 (20 overs)	v	Nepal; 93/4 (18.2 overs)
Elsa Hunter 39* (48); Sabnam Rai 2/27 (4 overs)		Sita Rana Magar 30 (38); Aisya Eleesa 1/14 (3 overs)

Nepal won by 6 wickets
ICC Academy Ground, Dubai
Umpires: Akbar Ali (UAE) and Ahsan Raza (Pak)
Player of the match: Sita Rana Magar (Nep)

- Nepal won the toss and elected to field.

26 November 2021
13:30
Scorecard

Hong Kong; 109/8 (20 overs)	v	Bhutan; 89/7 (20 overs)
Kary Chan 43 (50); Anju Gurung 3/10 (4 overs)		Ngawang Choden 22 (28); Kary Chan 2/17 (4 overs)

Hong Kong won by 20 runs
ICC Academy Ground, Dubai
Umpires: Rahul Asher (Oma) and Vinay Kumar Jha (Nep)
Player of the match: Kary Chan (HK)

- Bhutan won the toss and elected to field.

26 November 2021
13:30
Scorecard

Kuwait; 76/5 (20 overs)	v	United Arab Emirates; 77/3 (6 overs)
Maryam Omar 31* (37); Khushi Sharma 3/13 (3 overs)		Esha Oza 38 (13); Priyada Murali 1/21 (1 over)

United Arab Emirates won by 7 wickets
ICC Academy Ground 2, Dubai
Umpires: Vinod Babu (Oma) and Durga Subedi (Nep)
Player of the match: Esha Oza (UAE)

- United Arab Emirates won the toss and elected to field.

28 November 2021
09:30
Scorecard

United Arab Emirates; 127/5 (20 overs)	v	Nepal; 79 (19.4 overs)
Chamani Seneviratne 52 (36); Kabita Kunwar 2/21 (4 overs)		Indu Barma 15 (20); Samaira Dharnidharka 4/5 (4 overs)

United Arab Emirates won by 48 runs
ICC Academy Ground 2, Dubai
Umpires: Vinod Babu (Oma) and Ahsan Raza (Pak)
Player of the match: Chamani Seneviratne (UAE)

- Nepal won the toss and elected to field.

28 November 2021
09:30
Scorecard

Malaysia; 87/8 (20 overs)	v	Bhutan; 76 (19 overs)
Nur Arianna Natsya 19 (35); Anju Gurung 2/12 (4 overs)		Dechen Wangmo 35 (49); Mahirah Izzati Ismail 3/8 (4 overs)

Malaysia won by 11 runs
ICC Academy Ground, Dubai
Umpires: Akbar Ali (UAE) and Vinay Kumar Jha (Nep)
Player of the match: Mahirah Izzati Ismail (Mas)

- Malaysia won the toss and elected to bat.

28 November 2021
13:30
Scorecard

Hong Kong; 155/3 (20 overs)	v	Kuwait; 120/4 (20 overs)
Mariko Hill 55 (50); Maria Jasvi 1/30 (4 overs)		Siobhan Gomez 37* (39); Mariko Hill 1/20 (4 overs)

Hong Kong won by 35 runs
ICC Academy Ground, Dubai
Umpires: Rahul Asher (Oma) and Durga Subedi (Nep)
Player of the match: Mariko Hill (HK)

- Hong Kong won the toss and elected to bat.
- Tammy Chu and Heiley Lui (HK) both made their WT20I debuts.
