= Qatar women's national cricket team =

Qatar
- Flag of Qatar
- Association: Qatar Cricket Association

International Cricket Council
- ICC status: Associate member (2017); Affiliate member (1999)
- ICC region: Asia
ICC Rankings	Current	Best-ever
T20I	56th	24th (6 Feb 2019)

International cricket
- First international: v. Bhutan at Kuala Lumpur; 3 July 2009

T20 Internationals
- First T20I: v. Oman at West End Park International Cricket Stadium, Doha; 17 January 2020
- Last T20I: v. Bhutan at Kolej Tuanku Ja'afar Cricket Oval, Mantin; 6 June 2026
T20Is	Played	Won/Lost
Total	53	14/39 (0 ties, 0 no results)
This year	8	1/7 (0 ties, 0 no results)
- As of 6 June 2026

The Qatar women's national cricket team represents the country of Qatar in international women's cricket. The team is organised by the Qatar Cricket Association, which has been a member of the International Cricket Council (ICC) since 1999.

Qatar made its international debut at the 2009 ACC Women's Twenty20 Championship in Malaysia. The team won only a single match in the group stage, against Iran, and were eventually ranked eleventh after defeating Kuwait in the eleventh-place play-off. Qatar did not participate in the tournament's 2011 edition, despite it being hosted by nearby Kuwait, but returned for the 2013 tournament in Thailand. The team again only won a single group-stage match, against Kuwait, but this was enough to place them fourth in their group (out of six teams). Qatar were easily beaten in the seventh-place play-off, however, losing to Malaysia by 36 runs. In December 2014, Qatar competed in the inaugural edition of the Gulf Cricket Council (GCC) Women's Twenty20 Championship, which was also contested by Kuwait, Oman, and the United Arab Emirates. The team placed last, but at the following year's tournament, which Qatar hosted, lost to the UAE in the final.

In April 2018, the ICC granted full Women's Twenty20 International (WT20I) status to all its members. Therefore, all Twenty20 matches played between Qatar women and another international side after 1 July 2018 will be a full WT20I. Qatar played their first matches with WT20I status in January 2020 during a triangular series against Oman and Kuwait, which was held in Doha.

== Current squad ==
Updated as on 13 February 2024

This lists all the players who played for Qatar in the past 12 months or were named in the most recent squad.

Name	Age	Batting style	Bowling style	Notes
Batters
Shrutiben Rana	29	Right-handed	Right-arm medium	
Khadija Imtiaz	34	Right-handed	Right-arm off spin	
Krishna Bhuva	19	Right-handed	Right-arm medium	
Fataul Elkhair	20	Right-handed	Right-arm medium	
Devanandha Kavinisseri	19	Right-handed	Right-arm medium	
All-rounders
Aysha Abdur Rahman	35	Right-handed	Right-arm medium	Captain
Saachi Dhadwal	19	Right-handed	Right-arm medium	
Angeline Mare	25	Right-handed	Right-arm medium	
Wicket-keepers
Trupti Kale	42	Right-handed		
Rizpha Bano	32	Right-handed		
Spin Bowlers
Sabeeja Panayan	49	Right-handed	Right-arm off spin	
Rochelle Quyn	39	Right-handed	Right-arm off spin	
Pace Bowlers
Sudha Thapa	30	Right-handed	Right-arm medium	
Sarrinah Ahmed	21	Right-handed	Right-arm medium	

== Records and statistics ==
International Match Summary — Qatar Women

Last updated 6 June 2026

Playing Record
Format	M	W	L	T	NR	Inaugural Match
Twenty20 Internationals	53	14	39	0	0	17 January 2020

=== Twenty20 International ===
- Highest team total: 282/2 v. Saudi Arabia on 5 March 2022 at Oman Cricket Academy Ground Turf 1, Muscat.
- Highest individual score: 113*, Aysha Abdur Rahman v. Saudi Arabia on 5 March 2022 at Oman Cricket Academy Ground Turf 1, Muscat.
- Best innings bowling: 4/4, Hiral Agarwal v. Saudi Arabia on 5 March 2022 at Oman Cricket Academy Ground Turf 1, Muscat.

T20I record versus other nations

Records complete to WT20I #2823. Last updated 6 June 2026.

Opponent	M	W	L	T	NR	First match	First win
ICC Associate members
Bahrain	10	8	2	0	0	21 March 2022	21 March 2022
Bhutan	2	0	2	0	0	1 September 2023	
Hong Kong	1	0	1	0	0	4 June 2026	
Indonesia	1	0	0	0	0	13 February 2024	
Kenya	2	0	2	0	0	15 December 2022	
Kuwait	4	1	3	0	0	17 January 2020	17 January 2020
Malaysia	3	0	3	0	0	18 June 2022	
Nepal	5	0	5	0	0	16 November 2021	
Oman	12	2	10	0	0	17 January 2020	19 June 2022
Saudi Arabia	2	2	0	0	0	25 March 2022	25 March 2022
Singapore	1	1	0	0	0	21 June 2022	21 June 2022
Tanzania	3	0	3	0	0	14 December 2022	
Uganda	2	0	2	0	0	14 December 2022	
United Arab Emirates	5	0	5	0	0	20 March 2022	

== Tournament history ==
=== ICC Women's World Twenty20 Asia Qualifier ===
ICC Women's World Twenty20 Asia Qualifier records
Year	Round	Position	GP	W	L	T	NR
(Thailand) 2017	Did not qualify						
(Thailand) 2019	Did not qualify						
(United Arab Emirates) 2021	Did not qualify						
(Malaysia) 2023	DNQ	–	5	0	4	0	1
(Thailand) 2025	DNQ	–	4	0	2	0	2
Total	2/4	0 Titles	9	0	6	0	3

=== ACC Women's Premier Cup ===
ACC Women's Premier Cup record
Year	Round	Position	GP	W	L	T	NR
2024 (Malaysia)	Group stages	–	3	1	2	0	0
Total	1/1	0 Titles	3	1	2	0	0

=== ACC Women's T20 Championship ===
ACC Women's T20 Championship record
Year	Round	Position	GP	W	L	T	NR
2009 (Malaysia)	Did not participate						
(Kuwait) 2011 (Malaysia)	Did not participate						
(Thailand) 2013	Did not participate						
(Malaysia) 2022	Group stages	5/10	4	2	2	0	0
Total	1/4	0 Titles	4	2	2	0	1

=== ACC Women's Asia Cup ===
Women's Asia Cup record
Year	Round	Position	GP	W	L	T	NR
2004 (Sri Lanka)	Did not qualify (ODI format)						
2005-06 (Pakistan)	Did not qualify (ODI format)						
2006 (India)	Did not qualify (ODI format)						
2008 (Sri Lanka)	Did not qualify (ODI format)						
2012 (China)	Did not qualify in the tournament yet						
2016 (Thailand)	Did not qualify in the tournament yet						
2018 (Malaysia)	Did not qualify in the tournament yet						
2022 (Bangladesh)	Did not qualify in the tournament yet						
2024 (Sri Lanka)	Did not qualify in the tournament yet						
Total	0/9	-	0	0	0	0	0

=== ICC Women's T20 World Cup Qualifier ===
ICC Women's World Twenty20 Qualifier record
Year	Round	Position	GP	W	L	T	NR
(Republic of Ireland) 2013	Did not qualify						
(Thailand) 2015	Did not qualify						
(Netherlands) 2018	Did not qualify						
(Scotland) 2019	Did not qualify						
(United Arab Emirates) 2022	Did not qualify						
(United Arab Emirates) 2024	Did not qualify						
Total	0/6	0 Titles	0	0	0	0	0

=== ICC Women's T20 World Cup ===
Twenty20 World Cup Record
Year	Round	Position	GP	W	L	T	NR
(England) 2009	Did not qualify						
(Cricket West Indies) 2010	Did not qualify						
(Sri Lanka) 2012	Did not qualify						
(Bangladesh) 2014	Did not qualify						
(India) 2016	Did not qualify						
(Cricket West Indies) 2018	Did not qualify						
(Australia) 2020	Did not qualify						
(South Africa) 2023	Did not qualify						
(United Arab Emirates) 2024	Did not qualify						
(England) 2026	Did not qualify						
Total	0/9	0 Titles	0	0	0	0	0

=== ICC Women's World Cup ===
ICC Women's World Cup records
Year	Round	Position	GP	W	L	T	NR
(England) 1973	Did not qualify/No ODI status yet						
(India) 1978	Did not qualify/No ODI status yet						
(New Zealand) 1982	Did not qualify/No ODI status yet						
(Australia) 1988	Did not qualify/No ODI status yet						
(England) 1993	Did not qualify/No ODI status yet						
(India) 1997	Did not qualify/No ODI status yet						
(New Zealand) 2000	Did not qualify/No ODI status yet						
(South Africa) 2005	Did not qualify/No ODI status yet						
(Australia) 2009	Did not qualify/No ODI status yet						
(India) 2013	Did not qualify/No ODI status yet						
(England) 2017	Did not qualify/No ODI status yet						
(New Zealand) 2022	Did not qualify/No ODI status yet						
(India) 2025	Did not qualify/No ODI status yet						
Total	0/13	0 Titles	0	0	0	0	0

== See also ==
- List of Qatar women Twenty20 International cricketers
