= Hong Kong women's national cricket team =

Cricket team

Hong Kong
- Association: Cricket Hong Kong, China

Personnel
- Captain: Kary Chan
- Coach: Mamatha Maben

International Cricket Council
- ICC status: Associate member (1969)
- ICC region: Asia
ICC Rankings	Current	Best-ever
T20I	22nd	22nd (1 Feb 2019)

International cricket
- First international: v. Pakistan at Gaddafi Stadium, Lahore; 17 September 2006

T20 Internationals
- First T20I: v. Indonesia at Terdthai Cricket Ground, Bangkok; 12 January 2019
- Last T20I: v. Pakistan at Dubai International Cricket Stadium, Dubai; 7 September 2026
T20Is	Played	Won/Lost
Total	126	71/52 (2 ties, 1 no result)
This year	28	16/12 (0 ties, 0 no results)
- As of 7 September 2026

The Hong Kong women's cricket team represents the Chinese special administrative region of Hong Kong in international women's cricket. In April 2018, the International Cricket Council (ICC) granted full Women's Twenty20 International (WT20I) status to all its members. Therefore, all Twenty20 matches played between Hong Kong women and other ICC members after 1 July 2018 will be a full WT20I. Hong Kong made its Twenty20 International debut against Indonesia on 12 January 2019 at Bangkok during the Thailand Women's T20 Smash.

== History ==
They made their international debut in September 2006, playing against Pakistan in a three match series of one-day games to decide which country would represent the Asia region in the Women's Cricket World Cup Qualifier in Ireland in 2007. They lost the series 3-0 after a series of heavy defeats, two by more than 200 runs.

Hong Kong won the 2009 ACC Women's Twenty20 Championship, then defended their title and won the tournament again in 2011, narrowly defeating China with three balls to spare.

In 2010 Asian Games, Hong Kong team lost to Nepal as they finished 7th in the tournament at Guanggong Cricket Stadium in Guangzhou.

In 2014 Asian Games, Hong Kong team reached quarter-finals where they lost to Sri Lanka at Yeonhui Cricket Ground in Incheon.

In 2017, the Hong Kong women's team won the 2017 Women's Twenty20 East Asia Cup, with Yasmin Daswani awarded Player of the Tournament

In December 2020, the ICC announced the qualification pathway for the 2023 ICC Women's T20 World Cup. Hong Kong were named in the 2021 ICC Women's T20 World Cup Asia Qualifier regional group, alongside seven other teams.

On 11 February 2024, Mariko Hill became the first Hong Kong player to score a century in a WT20I century, making 100 not out against the Maldives at the ACC Women's Premier Cup in Malaysia.

== Tournament history ==
=== Women's World Cup ===
World Cup record
Year	Round	Position	GP	W	L	T	NR
(England) 1973	Did not qualify/No women's ODI status						
(India) 1978	Did not qualify/No women's ODI status						
(New Zealand) 1982	Did not qualify/No women's ODI status						
(Australia) 1988	Did not qualify/No women's ODI status						
(England) 1993	Did not qualify/No women's ODI status						
(India) 1997	Did not qualify/No women's ODI status						
(New Zealand) 2000	Did not qualify/No women's ODI status						
(South Africa) 2005	Did not qualify/No women's ODI status						
(Australia) 2009	Did not qualify/No women's ODI status						
(India) 2013	Did not qualify/No women's ODI status						
(England) 2017	Did not qualify/No women's ODI status						
(New Zealand) 2022	Did not qualify/No women's ODI status						
(India) 2025	Did not qualify						
Total	0/12	0 Titles	0	0	0	0	0

=== Women's World T20 ===
Twenty20 World Cup records
Year	Round	Position	GP	W	L	T	NR
(England) 2009	Did not qualify						
(Cricket West Indies) 2010	Did not qualify						
(Sri Lanka) 2012	Did not qualify						
(Bangladesh) 2014	Did not qualify						
(India) 2016	Did not qualify						
(Cricket West Indies) 2018	Did not qualify						
(Australia) 2020	Did not qualify						
(South Africa) 2023	Did not qualify						
(United Arab Emirates) 2024	Did not qualify						
(England) 2026	Did not qualify						
Total	0/10	0 Titles	0	0	0	0	0

=== ICC Women's T20 World Cup Asia Qualifier ===
ICC Women's T20 World Cup Qualifier Asia record
Year	Round	Position	GP	W	L	T	NR
(Thailand) 2019	DNQ	5/7	6	2	4	0	0
(United Arab Emirates) 2021	DNQ	2/6	5	4	1	0	0
(Malaysia) 2023	DNQ	2/6	5	3	2	0	0
(Thailand) 2025	DNQ	–	4	1	0	0	3
Total	4/4	–	20	10	7	0	3

=== Women's Asia Cup (T20I format) ===
Women's Asia Cup records
Year	Round	Position	GP	W	L	T	NR
(Sri Lanka) 2004	Did not participate (ODI format)						
(Pakistan) 2005–06	Did not participate (ODI format)						
(India) 2006	Did not participate (ODI format)						
(Sri Lanka) 2008	Did not participate (ODI format)						
(China) 2012	Group stage	8/8	3	0	3	0	0
(Thailand) 2016	Did not qualify						
(Malaysia) 2018	Did not qualify						
(Bangladesh) 2022	Did not qualify						
(Sri Lanka) 2024	Did not qualify						
(United Arab Emirates) 2026	Group stage	8/8	3	0	3	0	0
Total	2/10	–	6	0	6	0	0

=== Asian Games (T20I format) ===
Asian Games record
Year	Round	Position	GP	W	L	T	NR
(China) 2010	First Round	7/8	2	0	2	0	0
(South Korea) 2014	Quarter-finals	5/10	3	1	2	0	0
(China) 2022	Quarter-finals	5/9	3	1	1	0	1
Total			8	2	5	0	1

=== Women Twenty20 East Asia Cup ===
Women Twenty20 East Asia Cup record
Year	Round	Position	GP	W	L	T	NR
(Japan) 2015	Runners-up	2/4	4	3	1	0	0
(Hong Kong) 2017	Champions	1/4	4	3	0	0	1
(South Korea) 2019	Runners-up	2/4	4	2	2	0	0
(Japan) 2022	Champions	1/2	4	4	0	0	0
(South Korea) 2024	To be determined						
Total			16	12	3	0	1

== Records and statistics ==
International Match Summary — Hong Kong Women

Last updated 7 September 2026

Playing Record
Format	M	W	L	T	NR	Inaugural Match
Twenty20 Internationals	126	71	52	2	1	12 January 2019

=== Twenty20 International ===
- Highest team total: 222/1 v. Maldives on 11 February 2024 at Bayuemas Oval, Pandamaran.
- Highest individual score: 106, Mariko Hill v. China on 4 December 2024 at Mission Road Ground, Mong Kok.
- Best individual bowling figures: 5/2, Mariko Hill v. Tanzania on 19 November 2023 at Hong Kong Cricket Club, Wong Nai Chung Gap.

Most T20I runs for Hong Kong Women

Player	Runs	Average	Career span
Mariko Hill	2,223	24.16	2019–2026
Natasha Miles	2,057	27.79	2021–2026
Kary Chan	1,765	18.77	2019–2026
Yasmin Daswani	1,525	25.41	2019–2026
Shanzeen Shahzad	869	11.58	2019–2026

Most T20I wickets for Hong Kong Women

Player	Wickets	Average	Career span
Kary Chan	155	11.78	2019–2026
Betty Chan	92	12.40	2019–2025
Alison Siu	88	16.54	2019–2026
Maryam Bibi	76	17.85	2019–2026
Iqra Sahar	55	23.83	2021–2026

T20I record versus other nations

Records complete to WT20I #3008. Last updated 7 September 2026.

Opponent	M	W	L	T	NR	First match	First win
ICC Full members
India	1	0	1	0	0	3 September 2026	
Pakistan	1	0	1	0	0	7 September 2026	
ICC Associate members
Bahrain	2	1	0	0	1	19 June 2022	19 June 2022
Bhutan	8	8	0	0	0	13 January 2019	13 January 2019
China	15	10	4	1	0	19 February 2019	19 September 2019
Indonesia	2	0	2	0	0	12 January 2019	
Japan	13	10	2	1	0	19 September 2019	27 October 2022
Kuwait	6	6	0	0	0	25 February 2019	25 February 2019
Malaysia	11	8	3	0	0	27 February 2019	27 February 2019
Maldives	1	1	0	0	0	11 February 2024	11 February 2024
Mongolia	5	5	0	0	0	20 September 2023	20 September 2023
Myanmar	6	5	1	0	0	16 January 2019	16 January 2019
Namibia	7	1	6	0	0	25 April 2023	9 March 2025
Nepal	11	6	5	0	0	24 February 2019	22 November 2021
Netherlands	4	0	4	0	0	16 June 2024	
Qatar	1	1	0	0	0	4 June 2026	4 June 2026
South Korea	2	2	0	0	0	21 September 2019	21 September 2019
Tanzania	5	4	1	0	0	18 November 2023	18 November 2023
Thailand	8	0	8	0	0	14 January 2019	
Uganda	6	2	4	0	0	27 April 2023	30 April 2022
United Arab Emirates	11	1	10	0	0	18 February 2019	26 April 2023

== Squad ==
This lists all the players who were named in the most recent squad. Updated as on 14 February 2024

Name	Age	Batting style	Bowling style	Notes
Batters
Shanzeen Shahzad	32	Right-handed	Right-arm medium	
Natasha Miles	37	Right-handed	Right-arm medium	
Yasmin Daswani	31	Right-handed	Right-arm medium	
Emma Lai	38	Right-handed	Right-arm medium	
All-rounders
Kary Chan	29	Left-handed	Slow left-arm unorthodox	Captain
Mariko Hill	30	Right-handed	Right-arm medium	
Marina Lamplough	26	Right-handed	Right-arm medium	
Elysa Hubbard	34	Right-handed	Right-arm medium	
Wicket-keeper
Hiu Ying Cheung	30	Right-handed		
Spin Bowlers
Betty Chan	37	Right-handed	Right-arm off break	
Ruchitha Venkatesh	29	Right-handed	Right-arm off break	
Pace Bowlers
Maryam Bibi	23	Right-handed	Right-arm medium	
Iqra Sahar	24	Right-handed	Right-arm medium	
Alison Siu	28	Right-handed	Right-arm medium	

== Head coaches ==
- 2006: (Pakistan) Nasir Hameed
- 2019–2023: (England) Chris Pickett
- 2023–: (England) Andy Cottam

== See also ==
- List of Hong Kong women Twenty20 International cricketers
- Hong Kong national cricket team
