= 2023–24 Prime Minister Cup (women) =

Cricket tournament in Nepal

2023–24 Prime Minister Cup (Women)
- Dates: 21 December 2023 – 3 January 2024
- Administrator: Cricket Association of Nepal
- Cricket format: Twenty20
- Tournament format(s): Round-robin and Playoffs
- Host: Nepal
- Champions: APF Club (6th title)
- Runners-up: Koshi Province
- Participants: 8
- Matches: 32
- Player of the series: Rubina Chhetry (Koshi Province)
- Most runs: Rubina Chhetry (Koshi Province) (345)
- Most wickets: Puja Mahato (Madhesh Province) (12); Laxmi Saud (Sudurpashchim Province) (12)

The 2023–24 Prime Minister Cup (Women) was the ninth edition of the Prime Minister Cup Women's National Cricket Tournament, the premier Twenty20 cricket tournament in Nepal. The tournament was contested by teams representing the seven Provinces of Nepal as well as one departmental teams. It began on 21 December 2023 and end on 3 January 2024. The format was changed for the 2023–24 season, with the eight teams competing in a round-robin format with the top four advancing to the play-offs.

APF Club clinched the title of the Prime Minister Cup Women’s National Twenty20 Cricket Tournament for a record-extending sixth time after they defeated Koshi Province by 11 runs in the final.

== Squads ==
APF Club	Bagmati Province	Gandaki Province	Lumbini Province
Sita Rana Magar (c); Rajmati Airee; Karuna Bhandari; Indu Barma; Manju Bokati (wk); Suman Bist; Mamta Chaudhary; Sonu Khadka; Sarita Magar; Bindu Budha Magar; Jyoti Pandey (wk); Rekha Rawal; Roma Thapa; Nary Thapa	Asmina Karmacharya (c); Yashoda Bist; Khusi Dangol; Helisha Gurung; Krishma Gurung; Ashmita Kharel; Sony Pakhrin; Sanskrit Phuyal; Yashu Pandey; Kanchan Shrestha (wk); Bipisha Shahi; Salina Silwal; Manisha Upadhaya; Sabika Kumari Yadav	Kusum Godar (c); Armina Adhakari; Anjali Bishwokarma; Dhan Kumari Chhrtri; Rachana Chaudhary; Shila Regmi Chhetri; Niru GT; Sooman Khatiwada; Simran KC; Jyotsinka Marasaini; Srijana Paudel; Shristi Paudel; Shreya Sharma; Aakirti Tiwari	Saraswati GM (c); Kritika Marasini (vc); Kriti Adhikari; Sushmita Bhusal; Sushmita Bajgain; Chameli Chaudhary; Laxmi Chaudhary; Madhu D.C; Kamal GM; Ashma Pulami; Saraswati Pun; Manisha Rana; Sarmila Rokka; Ranju Shrestha
Karnali Province	Koshi Province	Madhesh Province	Sudurpashchim Province
Kiran Kumari Kunwar (c); Bimala Budhathoki; Rama Budhathoki; Gauri Bohara; Surati Buda; Trisana Bishokarma; Nikita Dhamala; Anju Gurung; Rakshi Khadka; Krishma Shahi; Nilam Shahi; Anjali Thapa; Bina Thapa; Yamuna Tharu	Rubina Chhetry (c); Apsari Begam; Alisha Khadiya; Bimala Mahala; Bandhana Rajbanshi; Kajol Rajbanshi; Lakita Rajbanshi; Sanu Rajbanshi; Sangita Rai; Sabnam Rai; Kajal Shrestha (wk); Namita Shrestha; Nisha Shahi; Riya Sharma	Kabita Gautam (c); Anuradha Chaudhary; Saraswati Chaudhary; Roji Kadari; Chandani Khatoon; Sabnam Khatoon; Aarti Mahato; Mina Mahato; Puja Mahato; Sana Praveen; Bhumi Singh; Pratima Sah; Alisha Yadav (wk); Sakshi Yadav	Ritu Kanoujiya (c); Bindu Rawal (vc); Ishwori Bist; Manisha Chaudhary; Sabita Dhami; Rewati Dhami; Kabita Joshi; Anu Kadayat; Samjhana Khadka; Manisha Pujara; Runi Poddar; Sova Rokaya; Laxmi Saud; Janaki Thapa

== Points table ==
Pos	Team	Pld	W	L	NR	Pts	NRR
1	APF Club	7	7	0	0	14	3.024
2	Koshi Province	7	6	1	0	12	1.976
3	Sudurpashchim Province	7	5	2	0	10	1.011
4	Bagmati Province	7	4	3	0	8	0.435
5	Madhesh Province	7	3	4	0	6	−0.340
6	Lumbini Province	7	2	5	0	4	−1.312
7	Gandaki Province	7	1	6	0	2	−1.029
8	Karnali Province	7	0	7	0	0	−3.874

Source: ESPNcricinfo
- The top 4 teams qualified for the playoffs.
- Advanced to Qualifier 1
- Advanced to Eliminator

== Fixtures ==
Cricket Association of Nepal released the fixtures details on 16 December 2023.

Match 1
21 December 2023
09:30
Scorecard

Bagmati Province; 117/4 (20 overs)	v	Madhesh Province; 89/5 (20 overs)
Yashoda Bist 47* (39); Puja Mahato 2/15 (4 overs)		Puja Mahato 35 (45); Asmina Karmacharya 2/18 (4 overs)

Bagmati Province won by 28 runs
Tribhuvan University International Cricket Ground, Kirtipur
Umpires: Ram Pandey and Mangilal Sharma
Player of the match: Asmina Karmacharya (Bagmati Province)

- Madhesh Province won the toss and elected to field.

Match 2
21 December 2023
09:30
Scorecard

Sudurpashchim Province; 87/9 (20 overs)	v	APF Club; 88/1 (16.1 overs)
Kabita Joshi 22 (27); Sonu Khadka 2/24 (5 overs)		Jyoti Pandey 49* (48); Ishwori Bist 1/20 (3 overs)

APF Club won by 9 wickets
Mulpani International Cricket Ground, Kageshwari-Manohara
Umpires: Rabindra Gupta and Niraj Singh
Player of the match: Jyoti Pandey (APF Club)

- Sudurpashchim Province won the toss and elected to bat.

Match 3
21 December 2023
13:15
Scorecard

Gandaki Province; 102/4 (20 overs)	v	Lumbini Province; 103/6 (17 overs)
Suman Khatiwada 33* (18); Saraswati Pun 1/12 (4 overs)		Laxmi Chaudhary 42 (44); Shristi Jaisi 2/18 (4 overs)

Lumbini Province won by 4 wickets
Tribhuvan University International Cricket Ground, Kirtipur
Umpires: Binod Baniya and Mangilal Sharma
Player of the match: Laxmi Chaudhary (Lumbini Province)

- Gandaki Province won the toss and elected to bat.

Match 4
21 December 2023
13:15
Scorecard

Karnali Province; 33/9 (16 overs)	v	Koshi Province; 35/0 (3.1 overs)
Kiran Kunwar 9 (27); Apsari Begam 3/12 (4 overs)		Rubina Chhetry 25* (17)

Koshi Province won by 10 wickets
Mulpani International Cricket Ground, Kageshwari-Manohara
Umpires: D Agrahari and Rabindra Gupta
Player of the match: Apsari Begam (Koshi Province)

- Karnali Province won the toss and elected to bat.
- The match was reduced to 16 overs per side due to technical issues.

Match 5
22 December 2023
09:30
Scorecard

Bagmati Province; 87/8 (20 overs)	v	Koshi Province; 92/2 (18.1 overs)
Yashoda Bist 41 (54); Sabnam Rai 2/13 (4 overs)		Kajal Shrestha 41* (51); Sanskriti Phuyal 1/12 (4 overs)

Koshi Province won by 8 wickets
Tribhuvan University International Cricket Ground, Kirtipur
Umpires: D Agrahari and Ram Pandey
Player of the match: Apsari Begam (Koshi Province)

- Karnali Province won the toss and elected to field.

Match 6
22 December 2023
09:30
Scorecard

Gandaki Province; 141/6 (20 overs)	v	Karnlai Province; 97/6 (20 overs)
Anjali Bishowkarma 51 (48); Anju Gurung 2/15 (4 overs)		Gauri Bohara 26 (16); Rachana Chaudhary 2/18 (2 overs)

Gandaki Province won by 44 runs
Mulpani International Cricket Ground, Kageshwari-Manohara
Umpires: Binod Baniya and Niraj Singh
Player of the match: Jyotsnika Marasini (Gandaki Province)

- Gandaki Province won the toss and elected to bat.

Match 7
22 December 2023
13:15
Scorecard

Madhesh Province; 40 (19.2 overs)	v	APF Club; 41/0 (5.5 overs)
Pratima Sah 15 (34); Sita Rana Magar 3/2 (2.2 overs)		Sita Rana Magar 19* (9)

APF Club won by 10 wickets
Tribhuvan University International Cricket Ground, Kirtipur
Umpires: Ram Pandey and Dharma Shakya
Player of the match: Sita Rana Magar (APF Club)

- Madhesh Province won the toss and elected to bat.

Match 8
22 December 2023
13:15
Scorecard

Lumbini Province; 71/7 (20 overs)	v	Sudurpashchim Province; 72/1 (9.5 overs)
Saraswati Pun 19 (30); Laxmi Saud 2/5 (4 overs)		Kabita Joshi 24* (12); Madhu DC 1/22 (3.5 overs)

Sudurpashchim Province won by 9 wickets
Mulpani International Cricket Ground, Kageshwari-Manohara
Umpires: Binod Baniya and Mangilal Sharma
Player of the match: Laxmi Saud (Sudurpashchim Province)

- Lumbini Province won the toss and elected to bat.

Match 9
24 December 2023
09:30
Scorecard

Koshi Province; 129/4 (20 overs)	v	Madhesh Province; 69/9 (20 overs)
Rubina Chhetry 57 (64); Mina Mahato 2/27 (3 overs)		Sana Praveen 27 (41); Sabnam Rai 2/8 (4 overs)

Koshi Province won by 60 runs
Tribhuvan University International Cricket Ground, Kirtipur
Umpires: D Agrahari and Ram Pandey
Player of the match: Rubina Chhetry (Koshi Province)

- Koshi Province won the toss and elected to bat.

Match 10
24 December 2023
09:30
Scorecard

APF Club; 151/3 (20 overs)	v	Lumbini Province; 61/9 (20 overs)
Indu Barma 70* (51); Saraswati Pun 1/16 (3 overs)		Laxmi Chaudhary 28 (49); Indu Barma 3/7 (3 overs)

APF Club won by 90 runs
Mulpani International Cricket Ground, Kageshwari-Manohara
Umpires: Rabindra Gupta and Hem Joshi
Player of the match: Indu Barma (APF Club)

- APF Club won the toss and elected to bat.

Match 11
24 December 2023
13:15
Scorecard

Sudurpashchim Province; 151/4 (20 overs)	v	Karnlai Province; 70/9 (20 overs)
Kabita Joshi 78* (50); Anju Gurung 2/35 (4 overs)		Trisana Bishowokarma 28 (35); Ritu Kanoujiya 3/6 (4 overs)

Sudurpashchim Province won by 81 runs
Tribhuvan University International Cricket Ground, Kirtipur
Umpires: D Agrahari and Niraj Singh
Player of the match: Kabita Joshi (Sudurpashchim Province)

- Karnali Province won the toss and elected to field.

Match 12
24 December 2023
13:15
Scorecard

Gandaki Province; 112/4 (20 overs)	v	Bagmati Province; 116/6 (18.4 overs)
Anjali Bishowkarma 32 (42); Krishma Gururng 1/7 (2 overs)		Yashoda Bist 39* (41); Shristi Jaisi 2/23 (4 overs)

Bagmati Province won by 4 wickets
Mulpani International Cricket Ground, Kageshwari-Manohara
Umpires: Hem Joshi and Mangilal Sharma
Player of the match: Yashoda Bist (Bagmati Province)

- Gandaki Province won the toss and elected to bat.

Match 13
25 December 2023
09:30
Scorecard

Lumbini Province; 133/5 (20 overs)	v	Karnali Province; 103/7 (20 overs)
Saraswati GM 53* (62); Rashmi Khadka 1/15 (4 overs)		Gauri Bohara 22 (22); Saraswati Pun 2/15 (4 overs)

Lumbini Province won by 30 runs
Tribhuvan University International Cricket Ground, Kirtipur
Umpires: D Agrahari and Mangilal Sharma
Player of the match: Saraswati GM (Lumbini Province)

- Karnali Province won the toss and elected to field.

Match 14
25 December 2023
09:30
Scorecard

Madhesh Province; 112/7 (20 overs)	v	Gandaki Province; 85 (19.4 overs)
Puja Mahato 38 (43); Suman Khatiwada 3/10 (2 overs)		Suman Khatiwada 42 (33); Puja Mahato 3/7 (3.4 overs)

Madhesh Province won by 27 runs
Mulpani International Cricket Ground, Kageshwari-Manohara
Umpires: Binod Baniya and Hem Joshi
Player of the match: Puja Mahato (Madhesh Province)

- Gandaki Province won the toss and elected to field.

Match 15
25 December 2023
13:15
Scorecard

Bagmati Province; 87/8 (20 overs)	v	Sudurpashchim Province; 88/4 (19 overs)
Kanchan Shrestha 19 (42); Laxmi Saud 2/11 (4 overs)		Bindu Rawal 28 (51); Sony Pakhrin 1/11 (4 overs)

Sudurpashchim Province won by 6 wickets
Tribhuvan University International Cricket Ground, Kirtipur
Umpires: Mangilal Sharma and Niraj Singh
Player of the match: Kabita Joshi (Sudurpashchim Province)

- Bagmati Province won the toss and elected to bat.

Match 16
25 December 2023
13:15
Scorecard

Koshi Province; 84/2 (20 overs)	v	APF Club; 90/2 (17.3 overs)
Rubina Chhetry 41 (58); Sonu Khadka 1/17 (4 overs)		Indu Barma 36* (34); Nisha Shah 1/18 (4 overs)

APF Club won by 8 wickets
Mulpani International Cricket Ground, Kageshwari-Manohara
Umpires: Bindo Baniya and Ram Pandey
Player of the match: Indu Barma (APF Club)

- Koshi Province won the toss and elected to bat.

Match 17
27 December 2023
09:30
Scorecard

APF Club; 160/2 (20 overs)	v	Karnali Province; 68/8 (20 overs)
Rajmati Airee 67 (55); Trisana Bishwokarma 1/32 (4 overs)		Trisana Bishwokarma 19 (19); Karuna Bhandari 4/13 (4 overs)

APF Club won by 92 runs
Tribhuvan University International Cricket Ground, Kirtipur
Umpires: D Agrahari and Hem Joshi
Player of the match: Rajmati Airee (APF Club)

- APF Club won the toss and elected to bat.

Match 18
27 December 2023
09:30
Scorecard

Koshi Province; 103/8 (20 overs)	v	Gandaki Province; 48 (15 overs)
Bimala Malaha 25 (37); Shristi Jaisi 2/17 (4 overs)		Suman Khatiwada 21* (20); Rubina Chhetry 3/0 (1 over)

Koshi Province won by 55 runs
Mulpani International Cricket Ground, Kageshwari-Manohara
Umpires: Dharma Shakya and Niraj Singh
Player of the match: Sangita Rai (Koshi Province)

- Koshi Province won the toss and elected to bat.

Match 19
27 December 2023
13:15
Scorecard

Bagmati Province; 109/8 (20 overs)	v	Lumbini Province; 100/8 (20 overs)
Helisha Gurung 46 (45); Sarmila Rokka 3/19 (4 overs)		Saraswati GM 29 (36); Khusi Dangol 2/14 (4 overs)

Bagmati Province won by 9 runs
Tribhuvan University International Cricket Ground, Kirtipur
Umpires: Hem Joshi and Mangilal Sharma
Player of the match: Helisha Gurung (Bagmati Province)

- Bagmati Province won the toss and elected to bat.

Match 20
27 December 2023
13:15
Scorecard

Madhesh Province; 82/7 (20 overs)	v	Sudurpashchim Province; 86/5 (19.5 overs)
Puja Mahato 27 (31); Laxmi Saud 4/21 (4 overs)		Kabita Joshi 26 (38); Sakshi Yadav 2/12 (4 overs)

Sudurpashchim Province won by 5 wickets
Mulpani International Cricket Ground, Kageshwari-Manohara
Umpires: Binod Baniya and Ram Pandey
Player of the match: Laxmi Saud (Sudurpashchim Province)

- Madhesh Province won the toss and elected to bat.

Match 21
28 December 2023
09:30
Scorecard

Sudurpashchim Province; 118/3 (20 overs)	v	Koshi Province; 122/2 (17.4 overs)
Bindu Rawal 33 (39); Apsari Begam 1/18 (4 overs)		Kajal Shrestha 54 (48); Anu Kadayat 2/19 (3.4 overs)

Koshi Province won by 8 wickets
Tribhuvan University International Cricket Ground, Kirtipur
Umpires: Rabindra Gupta and Niraj Singh
Player of the match: Kajal Shrestha (Koshi Province)

- Koshi Province won the toss and elected to field.

Match 22
28 December 2023
09:30
Scorecard

Lumbini Province; 96/7 (20 overs)	v	Madhesh Province; 97/2 (18.5 overs)
Laxmi Chaudhary 64* (64); Sakshi Yadav 2/17 (3 overs)		Puja Mahato 60* (59); Susmita Bhusal 1/14 (3 overs); Kamala GM 1/14 (3 overs)

Madhesh won by 8 wickets
Mulpani International Cricket Ground, Kageshwari-Manohara
Umpires: Binod Baniya and Hem Joshi
Player of the match: Puja Mahato (Madhesh Province)

- Lumbini Province won the toss and elected to bat.

Match 23
28 December 2023
13:15
Scorecard

APF Club; 127/3 (20 overs)	v	Gandaki Province; 75/7 (20 overs)
Mamta Chaudhary 40* (33); Jyotsnika Marasini 2/19 (4 overs)		Suman Khatiwada 17 (17); Nary Thapa 4/18 (4 overs)

APF Club won by 52 runs
Tribhuvan University International Cricket Ground, Kirtipur
Umpires: Dharma Shakya and Mangilal Sharma
Player of the match: Nary Thapa (APF Club)

- APF Club won the toss and elected to bat.

Match 24
28 December 2023
13:15
Scorecard

Karnali Province; 42 (13.4 overs)	v	Bagmati Province; 43/0 (4.5 overs)
Kushi Dangol 4/18 (3.4 overs); Suruti Buda 16 (7)		Yashu Pandey 25* (20)

Bagmati Province won by 10 wickets
Mulpani International Cricket Ground, Kageshwari-Manohara
Umpires: D Agrahari and Ram Pandey
Player of the match: Kushi Dangol (Bagmati Province)

- Karnali Province won the toss and elected to bat.

Match 25
30 December 2023
09:30
Scorecard

Sudurpashchim Province; 127/6 (20 overs)	v	Gandaki Province; 103/2 (20 overs)
Samjhana Khadka 26 (11); Rachana Chaudhary 2/16 (4 overs)		Suman Khatiwada 49* (48); Laxmi Saud 1/14 (4 overs)

Sudurpashchim Province won by 24 runs
Tribhuvan University International Cricket Ground, Kirtipur
Umpires: Binod Baniya and Niraj Singh
Player of the match: Suman Khatiwada (Gandaki Province)

- Sudurpashchim Province won the toss and elected to bat.

Match 26
30 December 2023
09:30
Scorecard

APF Club; 126/3 (20 overs)	v	Bagmati Province; 79/8 (20 overs)
Sita Rana Magar 44 (50); Manisha Upadhayay 1/22 (4 overs)		Sony Pakhrin 20 (39); Suman Bist 2/18 (4 overs)

APF Club won by 47 runs
Mulpani International Cricket Ground, Kageshwari-Manohara
Umpires: Ram Pandey and Mangilal Sharma
Player of the match: Sita Rana Magar (APF Club)

- Bagmati Province won the toss and elected to field.

Match 27
30 December 20223
13:15
Scorecard

Madhesh Province; 99/7 (20 overs)	v	Karnali Province; 21 (9.4 overs)
Puja Mahato 49 (50); Trisana Bishwokarma 2/15 (4 overs)		Bina Thapa 12* (18); Puja Mahato 4/9 (4 overs)

Madhesh Province won by 78 runs
Tribhuvan University International Cricket Ground, Kirtipur
Umpires: Binod Baniya and Dharma Shakya
Player of the match: Puja Mahato (Madhesh Province)

- Karnali Province won the toss and elected to field.

Match 28
30 December 2023
13:15
Scorecard

Lumbini Province; 69/9 (20 overs)	v	Koshi Province; 72/3 (10.2 overs)
Saraswati GM 17 (28); Rubina Chhetry 4/7 (4 overs)		Rubina Chhetry 44 (34); Kritika Marasini 2/13 (3 overs)

Koshi Province won by 7 wickets
Mulpani International Cricket Ground, Kageshwari-Manohara
Umpires: Rabindra Gupta and Hem Joshi
Player of the match: Rubina Chhetry (Koshi Province)

- Lumbini Province won the toss and elected to bat.

== Playoffs ==
Qualifier 1 / Eliminator
31 December 2023 - Kirtipur
1	APF Club	139/2 (20)
2	Koshi Province	87/4 (20)
31 December 2023 - Kirtipur
3	Sudurpashchim Province	100/1 (14.3)
4	Bagmati Province	99 (19)

Qualifier 2
1 January 2024 - Kirtipur
Q1L	Koshi Province	92/1 (13)
EW	Sudurpashchim Province	88/7 (20)

Final
3 January 2024 - Kirtipur
Q1W	APF Club	114/7 (20)
Q2W	Koshi Province	103/4 (20)

=== Qualifier 1 ===
Match 29
31 December 2023
09:30
Scorecard

APF Club; 139/2 (20 overs)	v	Koshi Province; 87/4 (20 overs)
Indu Barma 56* (50); Rubina Chhetry 1/18 (4 overs)		Rubina Chhetry 22 (26); Rekha Rawal 1/11 (3 overs)

APF Club won by 52 runs
Tribhuvan University International Cricket Ground, Kirtipur
Umpires: Binood Baniya and Rabindra Gupta
Player of the match: Indu Barma (APF Club)

- Koshi Province won the toss and elected to field.

=== Eliminator ===
Match 30
31 December 2023
13:15
Scorecard

Bagmati Province; 99 (19 overs)	v	Sudurpashchim Province; 100/1 (14.3 overs)
Kanchan Shrestha 36 (46); Krishma Thapa 3/32 (4 overs)		Bindu Rawal 54* (49); Manisha Upadhayay 1/20 (3 overs)

Sudurpashchim Province won by 9 wickets
Tribhuvan University International Cricket Ground, Kirtipur
Umpires: Ram Pandey and Mangilal Sharma
Player of the match: Bindu Rawal (Sudurpashchim Province)

- Bagmati Province won the toss and elected to bat.

=== Qualifier 2 ===
Match 31
1 January 2024
11:00
Scorecard

Sudurpashchim Province; 88/7 (20 overs)	v	Koshi Province; 92/1 (13 overs)
Samjhana Khadka 25 (24); Sangita Rai 2/13 (4 overs)		Kajal Shrestha 38* (35); Laxmi Saud 1/25 (4 overs)

Koshi Province won by 9 wickets
Tribhuvan University International Cricket Ground, Kirtipur
Umpires: Ram Pandey and Dharma Shakya
Player of the match: Sangita Rai (Koshi Province)

- Koshi Province won the toss and elected to field.

=== Final ===
Match 32
3 January 2024
11:00
Scorecard

APF Club; 114/7 (20 overs)	v	Koshi Province; 103/4 (20 overs)
Indu Barma 53 (47); Apsari Begam 3/21 (4 overs)		Rubina Chhetry 62 (58); Karuna Bhandari 1/18 (4 overs)

APF Club won by 11 runs
Tribhuvan University International Cricket Ground, Kirtipur
Umpires: Rabindra Gupta and Ram Pandey
Player of the match: Indu Barma (APF Club)

- APF Club won the toss and elected to bat.
