= 2024 Lalitpur Mayor Women's Cup =

Cricket tournament in Nepal

- Dates: 11 – 18 May 2024
- Administrator(s): Cricket Association of Nepal
- Cricket format: Twenty20
- Tournament format(s): Round-robin and finals
- Host(s): Nepal
- Champions: APF Club (4th title)
- Runners-up: Sudurpashchim Province
- Participants: 5
- Matches: 11
- Player of the series: Sita Rana Magar (APF Club)
- Most runs: Samjhana Khadka (Sudurpashchim Province) (156)
- Most wickets: Kritika Marasani (Lalitpur Mayor's XI) (11)

The 2024 Lalitpur Mayor Women's Cup was the fourth edition of the Lalitpur Mayor Women's Cup, the premier Twenty20 cricket tournament in Nepal. The tournament had 5 teams including Lalitpur Mayor's XI along with 4 teams that reached the semi-finals of the Prime Minister's Cup Women's T-20 National Tournament. The Lalitpur Mayor's XI team is formed from the players of remaining four provinces that did not reach the semi-finals of Prime Minister's Cup. All team play with each other's in round-robin format with top two team advancing to the finals.

Nepal A.P.F. Club were the defending champion having won the all three previous editions.

Nepal A.P.F. Club (APF) Club women have clinched the title of Lalitpur Mayor’s Cup Women’s Tournament 2024. They won their fourth consecutive title of the Lalitpur Mayor Women's T20 championship at the TU Cricket Ground by defeating Sudurpashchim Province by 2 runs in the final.

== Squads ==
Squads in the 2024 Lalitpur Mayor Women's Cup
APF Club	Bagmati Province	Koshi Province	Lalitpur Mayor's XI	Sudurpashchim Province
Sita Rana Magar (c); Rajmati Airee; Indu Barma; Karuna Bhandari; Manju Bokati; Suman Bist; Mamata Chaudhary; Sonu Khadka; Binu Magar; Sarita Magar; Rekha Rawal; Nary Thapa; Roma Thapa	Asmina Karmacharya (c); Yashodha Bist; Khushi Dangol; Helisha Gurung; Krishma Gurung; Sony Pakhrin; Sanskriti Phuyal; Yashu Pandey; Bipisha Shahi; Kanchan Shrestha (wk); Puja Saud; Salina Silwal; Sujita Thapa; Manisha Upadhaya	Apsari Begam (c); Alisha Khadiya; Smriti Katuwal; Bimala Mahala; Princa Magar; Kajol Rajbanshi; Lakita Rajbanshi; Sanu Rajbanshi; Sabnam Rai; Sangita Rai; Kajal Shrestha (wk); Namita Shrestha; Nisha Shah; Tika Shah	Puja Mahato (c); Laxmi Chaudhary (wk); Trushana BK; Sarswati Chaudhary; Kusum Godar; Sarswati GM; Shristi Jaisi; Kiran Kunwar; Semana KC; Aarti Mahato; Jyotsnika Marasini; Kritika Marasani; Aasma Pulami; Sana Prabin	Bindu Rawal (c); Ishwori Bist; Manisha Chaudhary; Rewati Dhami; Sabitri Dhami; Kabita Joshi; Anu kadayat; Ritu Kanoujiya; Samjhana Khadka; Radhika Pujara; Rubi Poddar; Laxmi Saud; Sova Rokaya; Janaki Thapa

== Points table ==
Pos	Team	Pld	W	L	NR	Pts	NRR
1	APF Club	4	4	0	0	8	2.486
2	Sudurpashchim Province	4	3	1	0	6	1.994
3	Lalitpur Mayor's XI	4	1	3	0	2	−0.652
4	Koshi Province	4	1	3	0	2	−0.734
5	Bagmati Province	4	1	3	0	2	−2.748

Source: ESPNcricinfo
- The top 2 teams qualified for the final.
- Advanced to final

== League stage ==
11 May 2024
13:30
Scorecard

Bagmati Province; 52 (14.2 overs)	v	Lalitpur Mayor's XI; 53/3 (13.1 overs)
Asmina Karmacharya 20 (26); Kritika Marasini 4/4 (2 overs)		Puja Mahato 23* (30); Khusi Dangol 1/6 (3.1 overs)

Lalitpur Mayor's XI won 7 wickets
Tribhuvan University International Cricket Ground, Kirtipur
Umpires: Sunil Pandey and Rajesh Thakur
Player of the match: Kritika Marasini (Lalitpur Mayor's XI)

- Bagmati Province won the toss and elected to bat.

12 May 2024
09:30
Scorecard

Sudurpashchim Province; 122/6 (20 overs)	v	Lalitpur Mayor's XI; 45/2 (11 overs)
Bindu Rawal 30 (28); Aarti Mahato 2/17 (4 0vers)		Saraswati GM 12* (19); Ritu Kanoujiya 1/14 (4 overs)

Sudurpashchim Province won by 16 runs (DLS method)
Tribhuvan University International Cricket Ground, Kirtipur
Umpires: Niraj Singh and Sushil Yadav
Player of the match: Bindu Rawal (Sudurpashchim Province)

- Lalitpur Mayor's XI won the toss and elected to field.
- Rain prevented any further play during Lalitpur Mayor's XI innings.

12 May 2024
13:30
Scorecard

APF Club; 56/3 (5 overs)	v	Koshi Province; 32/2 (5 overs)
Indu Barma 38* (15); Hiranmayee Roy 1/12 (1 overs)		Apsari Begam 20* (20); Sita Rana Magar 1/3 (1 overs)

APF Club won by 24 runs
Tribhuvan University International Cricket Ground, Kirtipur
Umpires: Bhoj Raj Baral and Hem Raj Bhatta
Player of the match: Indu Barma (APF Club)

- Koshi Province won the toss and elected to field.
- The match was reduced to 5 overs per side due to rain.

13 May 2024
09:30
Scorecard

Bagmati Province; 73/6 (20 overs)	v	APF Club; 74/2 (11 overs)
Helisha Gurung 31 (50); Karuna Bhandari 4/10 (4 overs)		Mamata Chaudhary 35 (32); Khusi Dangol 1/14 (3 overs)

APF Club won by 8 wickets
Tribhuvan University International Cricket Ground, Kirtipur
Umpires: Hem Raj Bhatta and Sunil Pandey
Player of the match: Karuna Bhandari (APF Club)

- Nepal APF Club won the toss and elected to field.

13 May 2024
13:30
Scorecard

Sudurpashchim Province; 112/8 (20 overs)	v	Koshi Province; 93/7 (20 overs)
Samjhana Khadka 54 (52); Hiranmayee Roy 2/13 (4 overs)		Kajal Shrestha 33 (40); Laxmi Saud 1/14 (4 overs)

Sudurpashchim Province won by 19 runs
Tribhuvan University International Cricket Ground, Kirtipur
Umpires: Rajesh Thakur and Sushil Yadav
Player of the match: Samjhana Khadka (Sudurpashchim Province)

- Sudurpashchim Province won the toss and elected to bat.

15 May 2024
09:30
Scorecard

Lalitpur Mayor's XI; 71/5 (20 overs)	v	APF Club; 72/2 (9.5 overs)
Puja Mahato 24 (39); Rekha Rawal 1/8 (3 overs)		Sita Rana Magar 50 (35); Kritika Marasini 2/18 (2.5 overs)

APF Club won by 8 wickets
Tribhuvan University International Cricket Ground, Kirtipur
Umpires: Bhoj Raj Baral and Rajesh Thakur
Player of the match: Sita Rana Magar (APF Club)

- Lalitpur Mayor's XI won the toss and elected to bat.

15 May 2024
13:30
Scorecard

Koshi Province; 63/6 (13 overs)	v	Bagmati Province; 64/2 (11.2 overs)
Apsari Begam 35 (38); Manisha Upadhayay 2/7 (3 overs)		Yashu Pandey 26 (23); Apsari Begam 1/10 (3 overs)

Bagmati Province won by 8 wickets
Tribhuvan University International Cricket Ground, Kirtipur
Umpires: Hem Raj Bhatta and Niraj Singh
Player of the match: Khusi Dangol (Bagmati Province)

- Bagmati Province won the toss and elected to field.
- The match was reduced to 13 overs per side due to rain.

16 May 2024
09:30
Scorecard

Sudurpashchim Province; 111/5 (20 overs)	v	APF Club; 112/7 (19.4 overs)
Bindu Rawal 36 (51); Indu Barma 1/17 (4 overs)		Mamta Chaudhary 32* (34); Laxmi Saud 2/29 (4 overs)

APF Club won by 3 wickets
Tribhuvan University International Cricket Ground, Kirtipur
Umpires: Bhoj Raj Baral and Sunil Pandey
Player of the match: Mamta Chaudhary (APF Club)

- APF Club won the toss and elected to field.

16 May 2024
13:30
Scorecard

Lalitpur Mayor's XI; 88/9 (20 overs)	v	Koshi Province; 89/4 (18 overs)
Ashma Pulami Magar 26* (32); Apsari Begam 3/25 (4 overs)		Kajal Shrestha 36* (45); Kritika Marasini 3/20 (4 overs)

Koshi Province won by 6 wickets
Tribhuvan University International Cricket Ground, Kirtipur
Umpires: Niraj Singh and Sushil Thakur
Player of the match: Apsari Begam (Koshi Province)

- Lalitpur Mayor's XI won the toss and elected to bat.

17 May 2024
09:30
Scorecard

Sudurpashchim Province; 157/2 (20 overs)	v	Bagmati Province; 48 (16.1 overs)
Samjhana Khadka 74* (47); Krishma Grurung 1/26 (4 overs)		Krishma Grurung 16 (23); Ritu Kanoujiya 3/5 (4 overs)

Sudurpashchim Province won by 109 runs
Tribhuvan University International Cricket Ground, Kirtipur
Umpires: Bhoj Raj Baral and Sunil Pandey
Player of the match: Samjhana Khadka (Sudurpashchim Province)

- Bagmati Province won the toss and elected to field.

== Final ==
18 May 2024
11:30
Scorecard

APF Club; 155/4 (20 overs)	v	Sudurpashchim Province; 153/5 (20 overs)
Sita Rana Magar 74 (55); Ritu Kanoujiya 1/23 (4 overs)		Kabita Joshi 67* (45); Karuna Bhandari 2/20 (4 overs)

APF Club won by 2 runs
Tribhuvan University International Cricket Ground, Kirtipur
Umpires: Niraj Singh and Rajesh Thakur
Player of the match: Sita Rana Magar (APF Club)

- APF Club won the toss and elected to bat.
