= 2023 Malaysia Women's Quadrangular Series =

International cricket tournament

2023 Malaysia Quadrangular Series
- Dates: 22 – 26 August 2023
- Administrator: Malaysian Cricket Association
- Cricket format: Twenty20 International
- Tournament format(s): Round-robin and final
- Host: Malaysia
- Champions: Nepal
- Runners-up: Hong Kong
- Participants: 4
- Matches: 8
- Player of the series: (Nepal) Indu Barma
- Most runs: (Malaysia) Ainna Hamizah Hashim (91)
- Most wickets: (Kuwait) Mariamma Hyder (7) (Nepal) Sita Rana Magar (7)

The 2023 Malaysia Quadrangular Series was a Twenty20 International (T20I) cricket tournament which took place in Malaysia in August 2023. The participating teams were the hosts Malaysia along with Hong Kong, Kuwait and Nepal. All the matches were played at Bayuemas Oval in Klang. The tournament formed part of the preparation of all four teams for the 2023 ICC Women's T20 World Cup Asia Qualifier tournament.

Nepal beat Hong Kong by 13 runs according to the Duckworth-Lewis-Stern method in the final to win the tournament.

== Squads ==
Hong Kong	Kuwait	Malaysia	Nepal
Kary Chan (c); Natasha Miles (vc); Maryam Bibi; Betty Chan; Shing Chan; Hiu Ying Cheung (wk); Yasmin Daswani (wk); Mariko Hill; Marina Lamplough; Alison Siu; Iqra Sahar; Shanzeen Shahzad (wk); Yee Shan To; Ruchitha Venkatesh	Amna Tariq (c); Priyada Murali (vc); Maryyam Ashraf (wk); Angel Gabriella D'Costa; Suchitha Lita D'Sa (wk); Raelyn D'Souza; Siobhan Gomez; Mariamma Hyder; Iqra Ishaq (wk); Maria Jasvi; Zeefa Jilani; Khadija Khalil (wk); Glenda Menezes; Maryam Omar; Balasubramani Shanti	Winifred Duraisingam (c) (Note: Winifred Duraisingam was named as the captain of the Malaysia squad, but Mas Elysa captained the team in all of their games.); Mas Elysa (c); Musfirah Nur Ainaa; Nur Aishah; Nik Nur Atiela; Irdina Beh Nabil; Aisya Eleesa; Ainna Hamizah Hashim; Mahirah Izzati Ismail; Wan Julia (wk); Suabika Manivannan; Aina Najwa (wk); Nur Dania Syuhada; Wan Nor Zulaika	Rubina Chhetry (c); Indu Barma; Apsari Begam; Ishwori Bist; Khusi Dangol; Kabita Joshi; Asmina Karmacharya; Samjhana Khadka; Kabita Kunwar; Sita Rana Magar; Puja Mahato; Rubi Poddar (wk); Bindu Rawal; Kajal Shrestha (wk)

== Round-robin ==
=== Points table ===
Pos	Team	Pld	W	L	NR	Pts	NRR
1	Nepal	3	2	1	0	4	0.853
2	Hong Kong	3	2	1	0	4	0.193
3	Malaysia	3	2	1	0	4	0.007
4	Kuwait	3	0	3	0	0	−1.244

Source: ESPNcricinfo

Advanced to the final
Advanced to the 3rd place play-off

=== Fixtures ===
22 August 2023
09:30
Scorecard

Kuwait; 22/7 (5 overs)	v	Malaysia; 23/2 (3.5 overs)
Maryam Omar 9 (10); Nik Nur Atiela 3/6 (1 overs)		Ainna Hamizah Hashim 13* (13); Mariamma Hyder 1/4 (1 overs)

Malaysia won by 8 wickets
Bayuemas Oval, Pandamaran
Umpires: Denish Sevakumaran (Mas) and Narayanan Sivan (Mas)
Player of the match: Ainna Hamizah Hashim (Mas)

- Malaysia won the toss and elected to field.
- The match was reduced to 5 overs per side due to rain.
- Musfirah Nur Ainaa and Nur Aishah (Mas) both made their T20I debuts.

22 August 2023
14:00
Scorecard

Hong Kong; 84 (19.1 overs)	v	Nepal; 87/4 (15.5 overs)
Kary Chan 34 (29); Sita Rana Magar 5/16 (4 overs)		Samjhana Khadka 36* (36); Kary Chan 1/7 (1 over)

Nepal won by 6 wickets
Bayuemas Oval, Pandamaran
Umpires: Rudy Ismandy (Mas) and Narayanan Sivan (Mas)
Player of the match: Sita Rana Magar (Nep)

- Nepal won the toss and elected to field.
- Puja Mahato (Nep) made her T20I debut.
- Sita Rana Magar (Nep) took her first five-wicket haul in T20Is.

23 August 2023
09:30
Scorecard

Malaysia; 68 (19.5 overs)	v	Hong Kong; 42/0 (9 overs)
Mas Elysa 30 (35); Maryam Bibi 2/9 (3 overs)		Mariko Hill 24* (26)

Hong Kong won by 10 wickets (DLS method)
Bayuemas Oval, Pandamaran
Umpires: Viswanadan Kalidas (Mas) and Narayanan Sivan (Mas)
Player of the match: Mariko Hill (HK)

- Malaysia won the toss and elected to bat.
- Hong Kong were set a revised target of 42 runs from 12 overs due to rain.

23 August 2023
14:00
Scorecard

Nepal; 89/8 (20 overs)	v	Kuwait; 55 (20 overs)
Indu Barma 23 (19); Mariamma Hyder 4/8 (4 overs)		Zeefa Jilani 11 (19); Indu Barma 3/10 (4 overs)

Nepal won by 34 runs
Bayuemas Oval, Pandamaran
Umpires: Nur Hijrah (Mas) and Viswanadan Kalidas (Mas)
Player of the match: Indu Barma (Mas)

- Kuwait won the toss and elected to field.
- Khusi Dangol (Nep) made her T20I debut.

25 August 2023
09:30
Scorecard

Hong Kong; 75 (18.2 overs)	v	Kuwait; 59 (16.3 overs)
Mariko Hill 17 (17); Amna Tariq 4/9 (4 overs)		Priyada Murali 16 (21); Betty Chan 3/12 (3.3 overs)

Hong Kong won by 16 runs
Bayuemas Oval, Pandamaran
Umpires: Nur Hijrah (Mas) and Viswanadan Kalidas (Mas)
Player of the match: Amna Tariq (Kuw)

- Kuwait won the toss and elected to field.
- Suchitha Lita D'Sa (Kuw) made her T20I debut.

25 August 2023
14:00
Scorecard

Nepal; 83/7 (18 overs)	v	Malaysia; 85/4 (16.2 overs)
Rubina Chhetry 23 (26); Ainna Hamizah Hashim 2/13 (4 overs)		Ainna Hamizah Hashim 37* (39); Puja Mahato 1/13 (2 overs)

Malaysia won by 6 wickets (DLS method)
Bayuemas Oval, Pandamaran
Umpires: Nur Hijrah (Mas) and Zaidan Taha (Mas)
Player of the match: Ainna Hamizah Hashim (Mas)

- Malaysia won the toss and elected to field.
- The match was reduced to 18 overs per side due to rain. Malaysia were set a revised target of 85 runs from 18 overs.
- Irdina Beh Nabil (Mas) made her T20I debut.

== 3rd place play-off ==
26 August 2023
09:30
Scorecard

Malaysia; 112/4 (20 overs)	v	Kuwait; 77/8 (20 overs)
Ainna Hamizah Hashim 46* (53); Maryam Omar 2/17 (4 overs)		Zeefa Jilani 38 (58); Aisya Eleesa 3/19 (4 overs)

Malaysia won by 35 runs
Bayuemas Oval, Pandamaran
Umpires: Denish Sevakumaran (Mas) and Zaidan Taha (Mas)
Player of the match: Ainna Hamizah Hashim (Mas)

- Kuwait won the toss and elected to field.
- Angel Gabriella D'Costa (Kuw) made her T20I debut.

== Final ==
26 August 2023
14:00
Scorecard

Hong Kong; 101/6 (20 overs)	v	Nepal; 37/1 (5.3 overs)
Kary Chan 29 (45); Khusi Dangol 3/20 (3 overs)		Indu Barma 19* (19); Iqra Sahar 1/13 (2 overs)

Nepal won by 13 runs (DLS method)
Bayuemas Oval, Pandamaran
Umpires: Nur Hijrah (Mas) and Denish Sevakumaran (Mas)
Player of the match: Khusi Dangol (Nep)

- Nepal won the toss and elected to field.
- No further play was possible due to rain.
