= Uganda women's cricket team in Nepal in 2022 =

International cricket tour

	Nepal	Uganda
- Dates: 16 – 21 May 2022
Captains	Rubina Chhetry	Concy Aweko

Twenty20 International series
- Results: Uganda won the 5-match series 3–2
Most runs	Jyoti Pandey (119)	Janet Mbabazi (103)
Most wickets	Kabita Kunwar (7)	Concy Aweko (9)
- Player of the series: Janet Mbabazi (Uga)

The Uganda women's cricket team toured Nepal in May 2022 to play five Twenty20 International (T20I) series. All of the matches in the series were played at the Tribhuvan University International Cricket Ground in Kirtipur. These were the first women's international matches played at Kirtipur. The series was used by Uganda as preparation for the 2022 Kwibuka Tournament.

Uganda won the first three matches, to win the series with two games to spare. Nepal won the fourth match of the series by 15 runs. Nepal also won the last match by 33 runs, with Uganda winning the series 3–2.

== Squads ==
Nepal	Uganda
Rubina Chhetry (c); Indu Barma (vc); Apsari Begam; Dolly Bhatta; Kabita Joshi; Asmina Karmacharya; Kabita Kunwar; Sarita Magar; Sita Rana Magar; Jyoti Pandey (wk); Sabnam Rai; Sangita Rai; Bindu Rawal; Hiranmayee Roy; Kajal Shrestha (wk); Roma Thapa	Concy Aweko (c); Janet Mbabazi (vc); Sarah Akiteng; Evelyn Anyipo; Kevin Awino (wk); Leona Babirye; Susan Kakai; Phiona Kulume; Patricia Malemikia; Rita Musamali; Franklin Najjumba; Rita Nyangendo; Shakirah Sadick; Sarah Walaza

== T20I series ==
=== 1st T20I ===
16 May 2022
13:00
Scorecard

Uganda; 102/5 (20 overs)	v	Nepal; 90/9 (20 overs)
Janet Mbabazi 29 (38); Kabita Kunwar 2/15 (4 overs)		Indu Barma 16 (28); Sarah Akiteng 2/13 (4 overs)

Uganda won by 12 runs
Tribhuvan University International Cricket Ground, Kirtipur
Umpires: Sanjay Gurung (Nep) and Durga Subedi (Nep)
Player of the match: Janet Mbabazi (Uga)

- Nepal won the toss and elected to field.
- Asmina Karmacharya (Nep) made her T20I debut.

=== 2nd T20I ===
17 May 2022
13:00
Scorecard

Nepal; 101/7 (20 overs)	v	Uganda; 102/9 (19.5 overs)
Bindu Rawal 26 (36); Janet Mbabazi 2/26 (4 overs)		Rita Musamali 30 (34); Kabita Kunwar 2/18 (3.5 overs)

Uganda won by 1 wicket
Tribhuvan University International Cricket Ground, Kirtipur
Umpires: Himal Giri (Nep) and Vinay Kumar Jha (Nep)
Player of the match: Rita Musamali (Uga)

- Uganda won the toss and elected to field.

=== 3rd T20I ===
19 May 2022
13:00
Scorecard

Nepal; 99/8 (20 overs)	v	Uganda; 101/4 (18.2 overs)
Jyoti Pandey 47 (54); Sarah Akiteng 2/16 (4 overs)		Kevin Awino 42* (51); Kabita Kunwar 2/22 (3 overs)

Uganda won by 6 wickets
Tribhuvan University International Cricket Ground, Kirtipur
Umpires: Himal Giri (Nep) and Durga Subedi (Nep)
Player of the match: Kevin Awino (Uga)

- Nepal won the toss and elected to bat.

=== 4th T20I ===
20 May 2022
13:00
Scorecard

Nepal; 97 (17.5 overs)	v	Uganda; 82/8 (18 overs)
Jyoti Pandey 17 (13); Concy Aweko 3/13 (4 overs)		Janet Mbabazi 21 (32); Hiranmayee Roy 2/11 (3 overs)

Nepal won by 15 runs
Tribhuvan University International Cricket Ground, Kirtipur
Umpires: Himal Giri (Nep) and Vinay Kumar Jha (Nep)
Player of the match: Hiranmayee Roy (Nep)

- Nepal won the toss and elected to bat.
- The match was reduced to 18 overs per side due to rain.
- Hiranmayee Roy (Nep) made her T20I debut.

=== 5th T20I ===
21 May 2022
13:00
Scorecard

Nepal; 123/5 (20 overs)	v	Uganda; 90/6 (20 overs)
Jyoti Pandey 49 (61); Phiona Kulume 1/18 (4 overs)		Rita Musamali 26 (38); Indu Barma 2/12 (4 overs)

Nepal won by 33 runs
Tribhuvan University International Cricket Ground, Kirtipur
Umpires: Sanjay Gurung (Nep) and Vinay Kumar Jha (Nep)
Player of the match: Jyoti Pandey (Nep)

- Uganda won the toss and elected to field.
