= 2016 Women's Twenty20 Asia Cup =

Cricket tournament in Thailand

Women's Twenty20 Asia Cup
- Dates: 26 November – 4 December 2016
- Administrator: Asian Cricket Council
- Cricket format: WT20I and WT20
- Tournament format: Group stage with finals
- Host: Thailand
- Champions: India (6th title)
- Runners-up: Pakistan
- Participants: 6
- Matches: 16
- Player of the series: (India) Mithali Raj
- Most runs: (India) Mithali Raj (220)
- Most wickets: (Pakistan) Sana Mir (12)

The 2016 Women's Twenty20 Asia Cup was the sixth edition of the ACC Women's Asia Cup, organized by the Asian Cricket Council. It took place from 26 November to 4 December 2016, in Thailand, and was the second edition played as a 20-over tournament. Matches were played at the Asian Institute of Technology Ground and the Terdthai Cricket Ground (both located in Bangkok).

India were undefeated during the tournament, and defeated Pakistan by 17 runs in the final. Along with India and Pakistan, four other teams took part – Bangladesh, Sri Lanka, hosts Thailand, and Nepal (the latter two teams qualifying through the Women's World Cup Asia Qualifier). Bangladesh, India, Pakistan, and Sri Lanka had Twenty20 International (T20I) status, with matches featuring two of these sides being played as such. Matches featuring either Nepal or Thailand did not have T20I status.

== Squads ==
Bangladesh	India	Nepal	Pakistan	Sri Lanka	Thailand
Jahanara Alam (c); Ayasha Rahman; Fahima Khatun; Fargana Hoque; Khadija Tul Kubra; Lata Mondal; Nahida Akter; Nigar Sultana (wk); Panna Ghosh; Ritu Moni; Rumana Ahmed; Salma Khatun; Sanjida Islam; Shaila Sharmin; Sharmin Sultana; Suraiya Azmin	Harmanpreet Kaur (c); Ekta Bisht; Jhulan Goswami; Mansi Joshi; Veda Krishnamurthy; Smriti Mandhana; Sabbhineni Meghana; Shikha Pandey; Anuja Patil; Poonam Yadav; Nuzhat Parween; Preeti Bose; Mithali Raj; Vellaswamy Vanitha; Sushma Verma (wk)	Rubina Chhetri (c); Sobha Aale; Indu Barma; Rashmi Chaulagain; Karuna Bhandari; Saraswati Kumari; Sarita Magar; Sita Rana Magar; Jyoti Pandey; Neera Rajopadhyay; Sabnam Rai; Bohara Roshani; Neri Thapa	Bismah Maroof (c); Javeria Khan (vc); Aliya Riaz; Anam Amin; Asmavia Iqbal; Ayesha Zafar; Diana Baig; Iram Javed; Maham Tariq; Nahida Khan; Nain Abidi; Nida Dar; Sadia Yousuf; Sana Mir; Sidra Nawaz (wk)	Hasini Perera (c); Prasadani Weerakkody (vc); Ama Kanchana; Chamari Atapattu; Dilani Manodara (wk); Eshani Kaushalya; Hansima Karunaratne; Inoka Ranaweera; Nilakshi de Silva; Nipuni Hansika; Oshadi Ranasinghe; Sripali Weerakkody; Sugandika Kumari; Udeshika Prabodhani; Yashoda Mendis	Sornnarin Tippoch (c); Nattaya Boochatham; Naruemol Chaiwai; Natthakan Chantam; Rosenan Kanoh; Nannapat Koncharoenkai; Suleeporn Laomi; Soraya Lateh; Wongpaka Liengprasert; Ratanaporn Padunglerd; Shagufta Arwe; Sirintra Saengsakaorat; Sainammin Saenya; Rattana Sangsoma; Chanida Sutthiruang

== Points table ==
Pos	Team	Pld	W	L	T	NR	BP	Pts	NRR
1	India	5	5	0	0	0	0	10	2.723
2	Pakistan	5	4	1	0	0	0	8	1.540
3	Sri Lanka	5	3	2	0	0	0	6	1.037
4	Bangladesh	5	2	3	0	0	0	4	0.135
5	Thailand	5	1	4	0	0	0	2	−1.797
6	Nepal	5	0	5	0	0	0	0	−3.582

Source: ESPNcricinfo

Qualified for the final

== Matches ==
=== 1st match ===
26 November
Scorecard

India; 118/6 (20 overs)	v	Bangladesh; 54 (18.2 overs)
Mithali Raj 49* (59); Khadija Tul Kubra 2/12 (4 overs)		Shaila Sharmin 18 (36); Poonam Yadav 3/13 (3 overs)

India won by 64 runs
Asian Institute of Technology Ground, Bangkok
Umpires: Buddhi Pradhan (Nep) and Sarika Prasad (Sin)
Player of the match: Mithali Raj (Ind)

- Bangladesh Women won the toss and elected to field.
- Mansi Joshi (India Women) made her WT20I debut.
- Bangladesh set a new record for the lowest total in WT20Is. It was broken just four days later, when they scored 44 against Pakistan.

=== 2nd match ===
26 November
Scorecard

Nepal; 47 (18.1 overs)	v	Pakistan; 48/1 (10 overs)
Rubina Chhetry 11 (33); Anam Amin 2/7 (3 overs); Sana Mir 2/7 (3 overs)		Ayesha Zafar 26 (35); Sabnam Rai 0/9 (2 overs)

Pakistan won by 9 wickets
Asian Institute of Technology Ground, Bangkok
Umpires: Mohammed Kamruzzaman (Tha) and Ashwani Rana (Tha)
Player of the match: Anam Amin (Pak)

- Nepal Women won the toss and elected to bat.

=== 3rd match ===
27 November
Scorecard

Thailand; 69/5 (20 overs)	v	India; 70/1 (11.1 overs)
Ratanaporn Padunglerd 20 (46); Mansi Joshi 2/8 (3 overs)		Veda Krishnamurthy 35 (26); Sornnarin Tippoch 1/17 (4 overs)

India won by 9 wickets
Asian Institute of Technology Ground, Bangkok
Umpires: Mohammed Kamruzzaman (Tha) and Batumalai Ramani (Mal)
Player of the match: Mansi Joshi (Ind)

- Thailand Women won the toss and elected to bat.

=== 4th match ===
27 November
Scorecard

Sri Lanka; 112/8 (20 overs)	v	Pakistan; 113/2 (18.2 overs)
Chamari Atapattu 31 (36); Nahida Khan 2/17 (4 overs)		Javeria Khan 56* (51); Eshani Lokusuriyage 1/16 (3 overs)

Pakistan won by 8 wickets
Asian Institute of Technology Ground, Bangkok
Umpires: Buddhi Pradhan (Nep) and Sarika Prasad (Sin)
Player of the match: Javeria Khan (Pak)

- Sri Lanka Women won the toss and elected to bat.

=== 5th match ===
28 November
Scorecard

Bangladesh; 88/6 (20 overs)	v	Thailand; 53 (18.3 overs)
Sanjida Islam 38 (48); Suleeporn Laomi 3/18 (4 overs)		Natthakan Chantam 21 (23); Panna Ghosh 4/9 (4 overs)

Bangladesh won by 35 runs
Asian Institute of Technology Ground, Bangkok
Umpires: Buddhi Pradhan (Nep) and Batumalai Ramani (Mal)
Player of the match: Sanjida Islam (Ban)

- Thailand Women won the toss and elected to field.

=== 6th match ===
28 November
Scorecard

Nepal; 23 (16.2 overs)	v	Sri Lanka; 24/2 (4.3 overs)
Jyoti Pandey 16 (39); Inoka Ranaweera 3/3 (4 overs)		Hasini Perera 17* (14); Karuna Bhandari 1/6 (2 overs)

Sri Lanka won by 8 wickets
Asian Institute of Technology Ground, Bangkok
Umpires: Mohammed Kamruzzaman (Tha) and Ashwani Rana (Tha)
Player of the match: Inoka Ranaweera (SL)

- Sri Lanka Women won the toss and elected to field.

=== 7th match ===
29 November
Scorecard

Pakistan; 97/7 (20 overs)	v	India; 98/5 (19.2 overs)
Nain Abidi 37* (41); Ekta Bisht 3/20 (4 overs)		Mithali Raj 36 (57); Nida Dar 2/11 (4 overs)

India won by 5 wickets
Asian Institute of Technology Ground, Bangkok
Umpires: Buddhi Pradhan (Nep) and Sarika Prasad (Sin)
Player of the match: Harmanpreet Kaur (Ind)

- India Women won the toss and elected to field.

=== 8th match ===
29 November
Scorecard

Bangladesh; 133/4 (20 overs)	v	Nepal; 41 (17.3 overs)
Nigar Sultana 39 (41); Sita Rana Magar 1/18 (4 overs)		Sita Rana Magar 15 (14); Fahima Khatun 4/8 (4 overs)

Bangladesh won by 92 runs
Asian Institute of Technology Ground, Bangkok
Umpires: Muhammad Kamruzzman (Tha) and Batumalai Ramani (Mal)
Player of the match: Fahima Khatun (Ban)

- Bangladesh Women won the toss and elected to bat.

=== 9th match ===
30 November
Scorecard

Bangladesh; 44 (15.3 overs)	v	Pakistan; 45/1 (9.5 overs)
Jahanara Alam 12* (8); Sana Mir 3/5 (3 overs)		Javeria Khan 26* (31); Khadija Tul Kubra 1/18 (3 overs)

Pakistan won by 9 wickets
Asian Institute of Technology Ground, Bangkok
Umpires: Buddhi Pradhan (Nep) and Sarika Prasad (Sin)
Player of the match: Sana Mir (Pak)

- Bangladesh Women won the toss and elected to bat.
- Bangladesh broke their own record for the lowest total in WT20Is, which they had set four days earlier against India.

=== 10th match ===
30 November
Scorecard

Sri Lanka; 120/6 (20 overs)	v	Thailand; 45/9 (20 overs)
Hasini Perera 55 (59); Sainammin Saenya 3/26 (4 overs)		Chanida Sutthiruang 10 (12); Inoka Ranaweera 3/4 (4 overs)

Sri Lanka won by 75 runs
Asian Institute of Technology Ground, Bangkok
Umpires: Batumalai Ramani (Mal) and Ashwani Kumar Rana (Tha)
Player of the match: Hasini Perera (SL)

- Sri Lanka Women won the toss and elected to bat.

=== 11th match ===
1 December
Scorecard

Nepal; 63 (19.5 overs)	v	Thailand; 65/2 (16 overs)
Jyoti Pandey 16 (26); Sornnarin Tippoch 2/5 (4 overs)		Sirintra Saengsakaorat 27* (45); Sarita Magar 2/13 (3 overs)

Thailand won by 8 wickets
Asian Institute of Technology Ground, Bangkok
Umpires: Batumalai Ramani (Mal) and Ashwani Kumar Rana (Tha)
Player of the match: Sirintra Saengsakaorat (Tha)

- Nepal Women won the toss and elected to bat.

=== 12th match ===
1 December
Scorecard

India; 121/4 (20 overs)	v	Sri Lanka; 69/9 (20 overs)
Mithali Raj 62 (59); Sripali Weerakkody 1/18 (3 overs)		Dilani Manodara 20 (32); Ekta Bisht 3/8 (4 overs)

India won by 52 runs
Asian Institute of Technology Ground, Bangkok
Umpires: Buddhi Pradhan (Nep) and Sarika Prasad (Sin)
Player of the match: Mithali Raj (Ind)

- India Women won the toss and elected to bat.

=== 13th match ===
2 December
Scorecard

India; 120/5 (20 overs)	v	Nepal; 21 (16.3 overs)
Shikha Pandey 39* (32); Rubina Chhetry 2/21 (4 overs)		Sarita Magar 6 (21); Poonam Yadav 3/9 (3 overs)

India won by 99 runs
Terdthai Cricket Ground, Bangkok
Umpires: Mohammed Kamruzzaman (Tha) and Ashwani Kumar Rana (Tha)
Player of the match: Shikha Pandey (Ind)

- Nepal Women won the toss and elected to field.

=== 14th match ===
3 December
Scorecard

Bangladesh; 93/3 (20 overs)	v	Sri Lanka; 97/3 (19 overs)
Sanjida Islam 35 (49); Chamari Atapattu 2/24 (4 overs)		Chamari Atapattu 39 (25); Rumana Ahmed 2/7 (2 overs)

Sri Lanka won by 7 wickets
Terdthai Cricket Ground, Bangkok
Umpires: Buddhi Pradhan (Nep) and Sarika Prasad (Sin)
Player of the match: Chamari Atapattu (SL)

- Sri Lanka Women won the toss and elected to field.

=== 15th match ===
3 December
Scorecard

Thailand; 51 (18.2 overs)	v	Pakistan; 52/5 (11.4 overs)
Natthakan Chantam 13 (28); Sana Mir 4/9 (4 overs)		Asmavia Iqbal 24 (25); Suleeporn Laomi 3/9 (3 overs)

Pakistan won by 5 wickets
Terdthai Cricket Ground, Bangkok
Umpires: Batumalai Ramani (Mal) and Ashwani Kumar Rana (Tha)
Player of the match: Sana Mir (Pak)

- Thailand Women won the toss and elected to bat.

== Final ==
4 December
Scorecard

India; 121/5 (20 overs)	v	Pakistan; 104/6 (20 overs)
Mithali Raj 73* (65); Anam Amin 2/24 (4 overs)		Bismah Maroof 25 (26); Ekta Bisht 2/22 (4 overs)

India won by 17 runs
Asian Institute of Technology Ground, Bangkok
Umpires: Buddhi Pradhan (Nep) and Sarika Prasad (Sin)
Player of the match: Mithali Raj (Ind)

- India Women won the toss and elected to bat.

== Statistics ==
=== Most runs ===
The top five runscorers are included in this table, ranked by runs scored and then by batting average.

Player	Team	Runs	Inns	Avg	Highest	100s	50s
Mithali Raj	India	220	4	110.00	73*	0	2
Javeria Khan	Pakistan	128	6	64.00	56*	0	1
Chamari Atapattu	Sri Lanka	111	5	22.20	39	0	0
Sanjida Islam	Bangladesh	110	5	22.00	38	0	0
Hasini Perera	Sri Lanka	96	5	32.00	55	0	1

Source: ESPNcricinfo

=== Most wickets ===
The top five wicket takers are listed in this table, ranked by wickets taken and then by bowling average.

Player	Team	Overs	Wkts	Ave	Econ	SR	BBI
Sana Mir	Pakistan	22.0	12	7.41	4.04	11.0	4/9
Ekta Bisht	India	16.2	10	5.20	3.18	9.8	3/8
Suleeporn Laomi	Thailand	16.0	8	8.00	4.00	12.0	3/9
Anam Amin	Pakistan	21.0	8	9.12	3.47	15.7	2/6
Anuja Patil	India	22.3	8	9.62	3.42	16.8	2/0

Source: ESPNcricinfo
