= Prime Minister Cup Women's National Cricket Tournament =

- Countries: Nepal
- Administrator: Cricket Association of Nepal
- Format: Twenty20
- First edition: 2015
- Latest edition: 2024–25
- Next edition: 2025–26
- Tournament format: Round-robin and Knockout
- Number of teams: 9 (10 form 2026)
- Current champion: APF Club (7th title)
- Current trophy holder: APF Club
- Most successful: APF Club (7 titles)
- Most runs: Rubina Chhetry (628)
- Most wickets: Karuna Bhandari (31)
- TV: Himalaya TV

Prime Minister Cup Women's National Cricket Tournament (Nepali: प्रधानमन्त्री कप महिला राष्ट्रिय क्रिकेट प्रतियोगिता) is a twenty20 cricket tournament in Nepal organised by the Cricket Association of Nepal.

The inaugural edition was contested among 10 teams and six teams contested the tournament from 2016 to 2018. The competition has featured 8 teams from the 2019 edition. Nepal A.P.F. Club are the most successful team in the history of the competition, winning 6 titles.

== Competition format ==
The inaugural tournament had 10 teams, nine regional and one departmental team, competing in two round-robin groups with the top two teams from each group advancing to the semi-finals. The following season the regional teams were replaced by teams representing the five development regions and the tournament was reduced to six teams while retaining the previous format.

Ahead of the 2020 season, the five regional teams were replaced by teams representing the seven provinces, taking the number of teams to eight. The tournament format remained unchanged until the 2023 season.

The format was changed for the 2023–24 season, with the eight teams competing in a round-robin format with the top four advancing to the play-offs.

== Teams ==
Province/Department	First season	Titles	Runner-up
Koshi Province	2019	1	3
Madhesh Province	2019	0	0
Bagmati Province	2019	0	0
Gandaki Province	2019	0	0
Lumbini Province	2019	0	0
Karnali Province	2019	0	0
Sudurpashchim Province	2019	1	2
APF Club	2015	7	2
Tribhuwan Army Club	2024-25	0	0
Nepal Police Club			

=== Defunct teams ===
- Region-I (Biratnagar)
- Region-II (Birgunj)
- Region-III (Kathmandu)
- Region-IV (Bhairahawa)
- Region-V (Nepalgunj)
- Region-VI (Baitadi)
- Region-VII (Janakpur)
- Region-VIII (Pokhara)
- Region-XI (Dhangadhi)
- Eastern Region
- Central Region
- Western Region
- Mid-Western Region
- Far-Western Region

== Winners ==
Season	Final		Best batter	Best bowler	Player of the tournament	No. of teams	Ref
Season	Winner	Runner-up	Best batter	Best bowler	Player of the tournament	No. of teams	Ref
2015	Region-VII (Janakpur)	APF Club	Shobha Ale (Region-VII)	Trishna Singh (Region-V)	Anuradha Chaudhary (Region-VII)	10	
2016	APF Club	Eastern	Laxmi Chaudhary (Mid-Western)	Santoshi Chaudhary (Eastern)	Sarita Magar (APF)	6	
2017	APF Club	Far-Western	Rekha Rawal (Far-Western)	Ritu Kanojiya (APF)	Sita Rana Magar (APF)	6	
2018	APF Club	Eastern	Kajal Shrestha (Eastern)	Rubina Chhetri (Eastern)	Rubina Chhetri (Eastern)	6	
2019	APF Club	Sudurpashchim	Kabita Kunwar (APF)	Khushi Dangol (Bagmati)	Sita Rana Magar (APF)	8	
2020	Koshi Province	APF Club	Jyoti Pandey (APF)	Karuna Bhandari (APF)	Sangita Rai (Koshi)	8	
2021	APF Club	Koshi	Apsari Begum (Koshi)	Alisha Khadiya (Koshi)	Rubina Chhetri (Koshi)	8	
2023	Sudurpashchim	Koshi	Kabita Kunwar (Sudurpaschim)	Manisha Chaudhary (Sudurpashchim)	Kabita Kunwar (Sudurpaschim)	8	
2023–24	APF Club	Koshi	Suman Khatiwada (Gandaki)	Puja Mahato (Madhesh)	Rubina Chhetri (Koshi)	8	
2024–25	APF Club	Sudurpashchim	Mamta Chaudhary (APF)	Manisha Upadhyay (Bagmati)	Indu Barma (APF)	9	
2025–26	TBD	TBD	TBD	TBD	TBD	10	

== Team's performance ==
=== Seasons ===
- C – Champion
- RU – Runner-up
- SF – Semi-final
- GS – Group stage

Season (Teams)	2016 (6)	2017 (6)	2018 (6)	2019 (8)	2020 (8)	2021 (8)	2023 (8)	2023–24 (8)	2024–25 (9)
Koshi Province	—			SF	C	RU	RU	RU	GS
Madhesh Province	—			SF	GS	GS	SF	GS	GS
Bagmati Province	—			GS	GS	GS	GS	SF	Super 4
Gandaki Province	—			GS	GS	GS	GS	GS	GS
Lumbini Province	—			GS	SF	SF	GS	GS	GS
Karnali Province	—			GS	GS	GS	GS	GS	GS
Sudurpashchim Province	—			RU	SF	SF	C	SF	RU
APF Club	C	C	C	C	RU	C	SF	C	C
Tribhuwan Army Club	—								Super 4
Eastern Development Region	RU	GS	RU	—					
Central Development Region	GS	GS	GS	—					
Western Development Region	GS	GS	GS	—					
Mid-Western Development Region	GS	GS	GS	—					
Far Western Development Region	GS	RU	GS	—					
