= Koshi Province women's cricket team =

Nepali domestic cricket team

Koshi Province
- Nickname: KPW
- League: Prime Minister Women's Cup

Personnel
- Captain: Rubina Chhetry
- Chairman: Sarwajeet Raj Pandey
- Owner: Koshi Province Cricket Association

Team information
- City: Biratnagar
- Colours: Light Blue
- Established: 2019
- Home ground: MBJ Cricket Ground
- Capacity: 15,000
- Secondary home ground: Girija Prasad Koirala Cricket Stadium
- Secondary ground capacity: 45,000

History
- PM Cup wins: 1 (2020)
- Lalitpur Mayor Cup wins: 0
- Official website: https://cricketnepal.org.np

Koshi Province women's cricket team (Nepali: कोशी प्रदेश महिला क्रिकेट टोली), also known as Team Koshi (former Province 1) is a Nepali provincial women's cricket team, based in the Koshi Province of Nepal. The team plays Twenty20 cricket in the Prime Minister Women's Cup The team is currently being run under the Koshi Province Cricket Association, with Rubina Chhetry as the team captain.

== Current squad ==
Name	Nationality	Birth date	Batting style	Bowling style	Notes
Batter
Namita Shrestha	Nepal	25 June 1999	Right-handed		
Sanu Rajbanshi	Nepal	18 September 2003	Right-handed	Right-arm medium	
Bimala Mahala	Nepal	4 July 2006	-	Unknown	
Lakita Rajbanshi	Nepal	29 December 2001	Right-handed	Right-arm medium	
All-rounders
Rubina Chhetry	Nepal	26 November 1993	Right-handed	Right-arm medium	Captain
Apsari Begam	Nepal	7 July 1999	Right-handed	Right-arm medium	
Nisha Shah	Nepal	8 October 2001	Right-handed	Right-arm medium	
Riya Sharma	Nepal	Unknown	Right-handed	Bowling all-rounder	
Wicket-keepers
Kajal Shrestha	Nepal	20 May 1999	Right-handed		
Bowlers
Sangita Rai	Nepal	24 February 2000	Right-handed	Right-arm offbreak	
Sabnam Rai	Nepal	23 August 1999	Right-handed	Right-arm offbreak	
Bandana Rajbanshi	Nepal	-	-	-	
Alisha Kumari Khadiya	Nepal	2 August 2001	Right-handed	Right-arm offbreak	
Kajol Rajbanshi	Nepal	10 November 2006			

As of 17 October 2023

== Coaching staff ==
Position	Name
Team manager	
Head coach	
Technical Analyst	
Assistant coach	N/A

As of 17 October 2024

== Seasons ==
=== Women's PM Cup ===
Season	Teams	Position
2019	8	Semi Finalist
2020	8	Champions
2021	8	Runners-up
2023	8	Runners-up
2023-24	8	Runners-up

=== Lalitpur Mayor's Cup ===
Season	Teams	Position
2021	5	3rd
2022	5	3rd
2023	5	Runners-up
2024	5	4th

== List of Captains ==
- Tika Shah – 2022 (9th National games)
- Rubina Chhetry – 2022/23 (Prime Minister's T20 Cup)
- Rubina Chhetri – 2023 (Lalitpur Mayor Women's T20 Championship 2023 )
