= Lalitpur Mayor Women's Cup =

- Countries: Nepal
- Administrator: Cricket Association of Nepal
- Format: Twenty20
- First edition: 2021
- Latest edition: 2024
- Next edition: 2025
- Tournament format: Round-robin and finals
- Number of teams: 5
- Current champion: APF Club (4th title)
- Current trophy holder: APF Club
- Most successful: APF Club (4 titles)
- Most runs: Sita Rana Magar (521)
- Most wickets: Kritika Marasini (26)

Lalitpur Mayor Women's Cup is a twenty20 cricket tournament in Nepal organised by the Cricket Association of Nepal with the financial support of Lalitpur Metropolitan City.

Nepal A.P.F. Club are the most successful team in the history of the competition, winning 3 titles.

== Competition format ==
The tournament had 5 teams including Lalitpur Mayors 11 along with 4 teams that reached the semi-finals of the Prime Minister's Cup Women's T-20 National Tournament. The Lalitpur Mayor's XI team is formed from the players of remaining four provinces that did not reach the semi-finals of Prime Minister's Cup. All team play with each other's in round-robin format with top two team advancing to the finals.

== Teams ==
Province/Department	First season	Titles	Runner-up
APF Club	2021	4	0
Bagmati Province	2024	0	0
Lumbini Province	2021	0	0
Lalitpur Mayor's XI	2021	0	0
Koshi Province	2021	0	1
Madhesh Province	2023	0	0
Sudurpaschim Province	2021	0	3

== Tournament season and results ==
Year	Winner	Runner-up	Best batter	Best bowler	Player of the tournament	Ref
2021	APF Club	Sudurpaschim Province	Rubina Chhetry (Koshi Province)	Binu Budha Magar (APF Club)	Sita Rana Magar (APF Club)	
2022	APF Club	Sudurpaschim Province	Jyoti Pandey (APF Club)	Ishwori Bist (Sudurpashchim Province)	Jyoti Pandey (APF Club)	
2023	APF Club	Koshi Province	Rubina Chhetry (Koshi Province)	Nisha Shah (Koshi Province)	Sita Rana Magar (APF Club)	
2024	APF Club	Sudurpaschim Province	Samjhana Khadka (Sudurpaschim Province)	Kritika Marasani (Lalitpur Mayor's XI)	Sita Rana Magar (APF Club)	
2025						
