= Bagmati Province women's cricket team =

Nepali domestic cricket team

Bagmati Province
- Nickname: BPW
- League: Prime Minister Women's Cup

Personnel
- Captain: Asmina Karmacharya
- Chairman: Paras Khadka
- Owner: Bagmati Province Cricket Association

Team information
- City: Kathmandu
- Colours: Dark Blue
- Established: 2019

History
- PM Cup wins: 0
- Lalitpur Mayor Cup wins: 0
- Official website: https://cricketnepal.org.np

Bagmati Province women's cricket team (Nepali: बागमती प्रदेश महिला क्रिकेट टोली), also known as Team Bagmati (former Province 3) is a Nepali provincial women's cricket team, based in the Bagmati Province of Nepal. The team plays Twenty20 cricket in the Prime Minister Women's Cup The team is currently being run under the Cricket Association of Bagmati Province, with Asmina Karmacharya as the team captain.

== Current squad ==
Name	Nationality	Birth date	Batting style	Bowling style	Notes
Batter
Asmita Kharel	Nepal	5 November 1990	Right-handed		
Helisha Gurung	Nepal	5 May 2003	Right-handed		
Yashoda Bist	Nepal	20 May 2000	Right-handed		
Bipisha Shahi	Nepal				
All-rounders
Krishma Gurung	Nepal	01 March 2007	Right-handed	Right-arm medium	
Salina Silwal	Nepal	Unknown	-	-	
Wicket-keepers
Kanchan Shrestha	Nepal	25 May 1998	Right-handed	Right-arm offbreak	
Sabika Kumari Yadav	Nepal	22 October 2006	Right-handed		
Bowlers
Asmina Karmacharya	Nepal	28 April 2000	Right-handed	Right-arm medium	Captain
Khushi Dangol	Nepal	5 February 2003	Right-handed	Right-arm offbreak	
Sony Pakhrin	Nepal	2 November 2007	Right-handed	–	
Sanskriti Phuyal	Nepal	23 December 2003	-	Right-arm medium	
Manisha Upadhyaya	Nepal	-	-	Slow left-arm orthodox	
Yashu Pandey	Nepal	-	-	Right-arm medium	

As of 18 December 2023

== Coaching staff ==
Position	Name
Team manager	Neera Rajopadhyaya
Head coach	Sudhir Kumar Maharjan
Technical Analyst	Rajan Shah (MomoCricket)
Assistant coach	N/A

As of 18 December 2023

== Seasons ==
=== Women's PM Cup ===
Season	Teams	Position
2019	8	Group Stage
2020	8	Group Stage
2021	8	Group Stage
2023	8	Group Stage
2023-24	8	Semi Finalist

=== Lalitpur Mayor's Cup ===
Season	Teams	Position
2021	5	DNQ
2022	5	DNQ
2023	5	DNQ
2024	5	5th
