= Madhesh Province women's cricket team =

Madhesh Province
- Nickname: MPW
- League: Prime Minister Women's Cup

Personnel
- Captain: Kabita Gautam
- Coach: Anil Sharma
- Chairman: Sunil Mahaseth
- Owner: Madhesh Province Cricket Association

Team information
- Colours: Orange
- Established: 2020

History
- Women's PM Cup wins: 0
- Lalitpur Mayor Cup wins: 0
- Official website: madheshcricket.com

Madhesh Province women's cricket team (Nepali: मधेस प्रदेश महिला क्रिकेट टोली), (formerly known as Province No. 2 Cricket Team) also known as Team Madhesh, is a Nepali provincial cricket team, based in the Madhesh Province of Nepal. The team plays Twenty20 cricket in the Prime Minister Women's Cup. The team is currently being run under the Madhesh Province Cricket Association. This team is currently being led by Kabita Gautam.

Madhesh Province Cricket Team plays in PM Cup women's national tournament organized by Cricket Association of Nepal. Madhesh Province Women's team qualified for the semifinal for the very first time in the 2023 season. They were unable to make into the final, losing by a huge margin against Sudurpaschim Province women's team.

== Coaching staff ==
Position	Name
Head Coach	Anil Sharma
Team Manager	N/A
Technical Analyst	Navneet Jaiswal

== Seasons ==
=== Women's PM Cup ===
Season	Teams	Position
2019	8	Semi Finalist
2020	8	Group Stage
2021	8	Group Stage
2023	8	Semi Finalist
2023-24	8	Group Stage

=== Lalitpur Mayor's Cup ===
Season	Teams	Position
2021	5	DNQ
2022	5	DNQ
2023	5	4th
2024	5	DNQ
