= Gandaki Province women's cricket team =

Nepali domestic cricket team

Gandaki Province Women
- Nickname: GPW
- League: Prime Minister Women's Cup

Personnel
- Owner: Gandaki Province Cricket Association

Team information
- City: Pokhara
- Colours: Yellow
- Established: 2019
- Home ground: Pokhara International Cricket Stadium
- Capacity: 20,000

History
- PM Cup wins: 0
- Lalitpur Mayor Cup wins: 0
- Official website: https://cricketnepal.org.np

The Gandaki Province women's cricket team (Nepali: गण्डकी प्रदेश महिला क्रिकेट टोली) represents Gandaki Province in women's domestic cricket in Nepal. The team participates in various national tournaments, showcasing the talent and skill of Nepalese women cricketers. The team is currently being run under the Cricket Association of Gandaki Province.

== History ==
The team was formed to promote women's cricket in Gandaki Province and has been actively participating in domestic tournaments since its inception. The team has produced several talented players who have gone on to represent Nepal at the international level.

== Current Squad ==
The squad for the Gandaki Province Women's Cricket Team is selected based on performance in domestic tournaments and trials. The team is composed of players from various regions within Gandaki Province.

Name	Nationality	Birth date	Batting style	Bowling style	Notes
Batter
Anjali Bishowkarma	Nepal	14 March 2005	Right-handed	Right-arm medium	
Bindu Thapa Magar	Nepal	7 June 2000	Right-handed		
Shreya Sharma	Nepal	N/A	N/A	N/A	
Srijana Poudel	Nepal	4 August 2003	Right-handed		
Sujita Thapa	Nepal	7 October 2000	Right-handed		
All-rounders
Shristi Jaisi	Nepal	22 January 2004	Right-handed	Right-arm medium	
Jyotsnika Marasini	Nepal	30 December 2007	Right-handed	Right-arm medium	
Seemana KC	Nepal	25 August 2006	Right-handed	Right-arm medium	
Wicket-keepers
Shraddha Gurung	Nepal				
Bowlers
Shila Regmi Chhetri	Nepal	29 October 2000	Right-handed	Right-arm medium	
Kusum Godar	Nepal	9 June 2007	Right-handed	Right-arm medium	Captain
Niruta GT	Nepal	16 April 2003	Right-handed	Right-arm offbreak	
Aakriti Tiwari	Nepal	13 May 2006	Right-handed	Right-arm medium	

As of 17 October 2023

== Future Prospects ==
The team aims to continue its development and achieve greater success in upcoming tournaments. With a focus on training and development, the Gandaki Province Women's Cricket Team hopes to produce more players who can represent Nepal at the international level.
