= Sonu Khadka =

Nepali cricketer (born 1994)

Personal information
- Full name: Sonu Khadka
- Born: 14 September 1994 (age 32); Nepal
- Batting: Right handed
- Bowling: Left arm fast medium
- Role: Bowler

International information
- National side: Nepal
- T20I debut (cap 13): 14 January 2019 v UAE
- Last T20I: 7 December 2019 v Maldives

Career statistics
Competition	WT20I
Matches	9
Runs scored	12
Batting average	12.00
100s/50s	0/0
Top score	12
Balls bowled	78
Wickets	3
Bowling average	22.66
5 wickets in innings	0
10 wickets in match	0
Best bowling	2/6
Catches/stumpings	1/–
Medal record
Representing Nepal
Women's Cricket
South Asian Games
Bronze medal – third place	2019 Kathmandu/Pokhara	Team
- Source: Cricinfo, 20 September 2021

Sonu Khadka (Nepali: सोनु खड्का, born 14 September 1994) is a Nepalese cricketer who plays for the Nepal women's national cricket team.

== Playing career ==
On 14 January 2019, She made her Twenty20 International debut against UAE women's in the Thailand Women's T20 Smash. She represented Nepal in the 2019 ICC Women's Qualifier Asia in Bangkok, Thailand. This tournament was the part of Asia region qualifier for the 2019 ICC Women's World Twenty20 Qualifier as well as the 2020 Women's Cricket World Cup Qualifier tournaments, with the top team progressing to both of them.
