= Soraya Lateh =

Thai cricketer (born 1999)

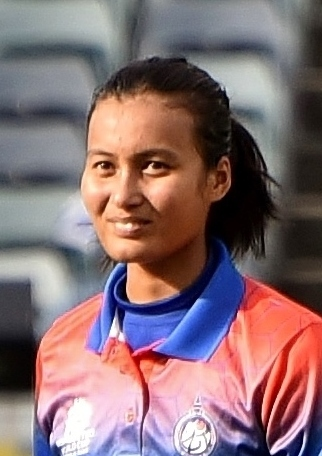
- Lateh playing for Thailand during the 2020 ICC Women's T20 World Cup

Personal information
- Born: 15 March 1999 (age 27); Pattani, Thailand
- Batting: Left-handed
- Bowling: Slow Left arm Orthodox
- Role: Bowler

International information
- National side: Thailand
- T20I debut (cap 15): 24 February 2019 v Kuwait
- Last T20I: 3 March 2020 v Pakistan

Career statistics
| Competition | WT20I |
|---|---|
| Matches | 18 |
| Runs scored | 3 |
| Batting average | – |
| 100s/50s | 0/0 |
| Top score | 3* |
| Balls bowled | 48 |
| Wickets | 2 |
| Bowling average | 32.50 |
| 5 wickets in innings | 0 |
| 10 wickets in match | 0 |
| Best bowling | 1/21 |
| Catches/stumpings | 10/– |
Medal record
Representing Thailand
Women's Cricket
Southeast Asian Games
| Gold medal – first place | 2017 Kuala Lumpur | Twenty20 |
- Source: ESPNcricinfo, 3 March 2020

Soraya Lateh (Thai:โสรยา ลาเต๊ะ, born 15 March 1999) is a Thai cricketer. She played for the Thailand women's national cricket team in the 2017 Women's Cricket World Cup Qualifier in February 2017. She made her Women's Twenty20 International (WT20I) debut for Thailand against Kuwait on 24 February 2019, in the 2019 ICC Women's Qualifier Asia.

In August 2019, she was named in Thailand's squad for the 2019 ICC Women's World Twenty20 Qualifier tournament in Scotland. In January 2020, she was named in Thailand's squad for the 2020 ICC Women's T20 World Cup in Australia.
