= Sirintra Saengsakaorat =

Thai cricketer (born 1996)

Personal information
- Born: 18 November 1996 (age 29)
- Batting: Right-handed

International information
- National side: Thailand
- T20I debut (cap 8): 3 June 2018 v Pakistan
- Last T20I: 14 July 2018 v Uganda

Career statistics
Competition	WT20I
Matches	10
Runs scored	30
Batting average	10.00
100s/50s	0/0
Top score	14
Catches/stumpings	0/–
Medal record
Representing Thailand
Women's Cricket
Southeast Asian Games
Gold medal – first place	2017 Kuala Lumpur	Twenty20
- Source: Cricinfo, 14 July 2018

Sirintra Saengsakaorat (Thai:สิรินทรา แสงสกาวรัตน์; born 18 November 1996) is a Thai cricketer, who has played for the women's national cricket team . She was part of Thailand's squad at the 2017 Women's Cricket World Cup Qualifier in February 2017. In June 2018, she was named in Thailand's squad for the 2018 ICC Women's World Twenty20 Qualifier tournament. She made her Women's Twenty20 International (WT20I) debut for Thailand on 3 June 2018, in the 2018 Women's Twenty20 Asia Cup.
