= 2019 Women's T20 World Cup Asia Qualifier =

International cricket tournament

2019 ICC Women's Qualifier Asia
- Dates: 18 – 27 February 2019
- Administrator: International Cricket Council
- Cricket format: Twenty20 International
- Host: Thailand
- Champions: Thailand
- Runners-up: Nepal
- Participants: 7
- Matches: 21
- Player of the series: (Nepal) Sita Magar
- Most runs: (Thailand) Naruemol Chaiwai (181)
- Most wickets: (Thailand) Sornnarin Tippoch (13) (Nepal) Nary Thapa (13)

The 2019 ICC Women's Qualifier Asia was a cricket tournament that was held in Thailand in February 2019. The matches were played as Women's Twenty20 Internationals (WT20Is), with the top team progressing to both the 2019 ICC Women's World Twenty20 Qualifier and the 2021 Women's Cricket World Cup Qualifier tournaments. The fixtures took place at the Terdthai Cricket Ground and the Asian Institute of Technology Ground in Bangkok.

Ahead of the final round of fixtures, Thailand, United Arab Emirates and Nepal all had a chance to top the group and progress to the next phase of qualification. Thailand won the tournament, after beating the United Arab Emirates by 50 runs in their final match. They won all of their matches in the tournament, with the final being Thailand's 14th consecutive win in T20Is. Nepal finished the tournament in second place, and the United Arab Emirates in third.

== Teams ==
The following teams competed in the tournament:

- China
- Hong Kong
- Kuwait
- Malaysia
- Nepal
- Thailand
- United Arab Emirates

== Points table ==
Pos	Team	Pld	W	L	T	NR	Pts	NRR	
1	Thailand (H)	6	6	0	0	0	12	3.268	Advanced to qualifying tournament
2	Nepal	6	5	1	0	0	10	0.564	Eliminated
3	United Arab Emirates	6	4	2	0	0	8	1.089	Eliminated
4	China	6	3	3	0	0	6	0.337	Eliminated
5	Hong Kong	6	2	4	0	0	4	−0.509	Eliminated
6	Malaysia	6	1	5	0	0	2	−1.568	Eliminated
7	Kuwait	6	0	6	0	0	0	−3.342	Eliminated

(H) Host

== Fixtures ==
=== Round 1 ===
18 February 2019
10:00
Scorecard

China; 32/7 (8 overs)	v	Thailand; 35/4 (7.5 overs)
Zhang Mei 11 (11); Chanida Sutthiruang 3/3 (2 overs)		Natthakan Chantam 16 (16); Wu Juan 2/6 (2 overs)

Thailand Women won by 6 wickets
Terdthai Cricket Ground, Bangkok
Umpires: Tabarak Dar (HK) and Sharfuddoula (Ban)
Player of the match: Chanida Sutthiruang (Tha)

- Thailand Women won the toss and elected to field.
- The match was reduced to 8 overs per side due to rain.
- Zhang Mei, Caiyun Zhou, Zheng Lili, Huang Zhuo, Fengfeng Song, Wu Juan, Wang Meng and Liu Jie (Chn) all made their WT20I debuts.
- Chanida Sutthiruang (Tha) took a hat-trick.

18 February 2019
10:00
Scorecard

Malaysia; 139/3 (20 overs)	v	Kuwait; 76 (18.3 overs)
Elsa Hunter 42* (40); Mariamma Hyder 2/21 (4 overs)		Mariamma Hyder 15 (28); Mas Elysa 3/9 (4 overs)

Malalysia Women won by 63 runs
Asian Institute of Technology Ground, Bangkok
Umpires: Vinay Kumar Jha (Nep) and Durga Subedi (Nep)
Player of the match: Mas Elysa (Mas)

- Kuwait Women won the toss and elected to field.
- Maryam Omar, Priyada Murali, Amna Tariq, Mariamma Hyder, Siobhan Gomez, Maria Jasvi, Khadija Khalil, Maryyam Ashraf, Zeefa Jilani, Madeeha Zuberi and Sabreen Zaki (Kuw) all made their WT20I debuts.

18 February 2019
14:00
Scorecard

United Arab Emirates; 106/8 (20 overs)	v	Hong Kong; 85/8 (20 overs)
Esha Oza 19 (18); Betty Chan 2/14 (4 overs)		Kary Chan 19 (25); Shubha Venkataraman 2/16 (4 overs)

United Arab Emirates Women won by 21 runs
Asian Institute of Technology Ground, Bangkok
Umpires: Vinay Kumar Jha (Nep) and Viswanadan Kalidas (Mas)
Player of the match: Shubha Venkataraman (UAE)

- United Arab Emirates Women won the toss and elected to bat.
- Jenefer Davies, Yee Shan To, Marina Lamplough, Maryam Bibi (HK) and Ishani Seneviratne (UAE) all made their WT20I debuts.

=== Round 2 ===
19 February 2019
10:00
Scorecard

Nepal; 126/5 (20 overs)	v	Malaysia; 92/7 (20 overs)
Sita Magar 42 (40); Sasha Azmi 1/20 (4 overs)		Christina Baret 21 (29); Sarita Magar 2/12 (3 overs)

Nepal Women won by 34 runs
Terdthai Cricket Ground, Bangkok
Umpires: Akbar Ali (UAE) and Tabarak Dar (HK)
Player of the match: Sita Magar (Nep)

- Nepal Women won the toss and elected to bat.

19 February 2019
14:00
Scorecard

Hong Kong; 86/8 (20 overs)	v	China; 87/9 (19.5 overs)
Yee Shan To 37 (44); Wang Meng 2/17 (4 overs)		Huang Zhuo 24 (46); Yee Shan To 3/9 (3 overs)

China Women won by 1 wicket
Terdthai Cricket Ground, Bangkok
Umpires: Akbar Ali (UAE) and Sharfuddoula (Ban)
Player of the match: Yee Shan To (HK)

- China Women won the toss and elected to field.

19 February 2019
14:00
Scorecard

United Arab Emirates; 145/5 (20 overs)	v	Kuwait; 59 (16.2 overs)
Esha Oza 41 (41); Amna Tariq 2/21 (3 overs)		Maryam Omar 15 (17); Chamani Seneviratne 5/3 (4 overs)

United Arab Emirates Women won by 86 runs
Asian Institute of Technology Ground, Bangkok
Umpires: Viswanadan Kalidas (Mas) and Durga Subedi (Nep)
Player of the match: Chamani Seneviratne (UAE)

- United Arab Emirates Women won the toss and elected to bat.
- Mofida Kocchargi and Mahnoor Mahmood (Kuw) both made their WT20I debuts.
- Chamani Seneviratne (UAE) took her first five-wicket haul in WT20Is.

=== Round 3 ===
21 February 2019
10:00
Scorecard

United Arab Emirates; 125/6 (20 overs)	v	Malaysia; 39 (13 overs)
Kavisha Egodage 44 (46); Winifred Duraisingam 2/24 (4 overs)		Yusrina Yaakop 12 (17); Esha Oza 3/0 (1 over)

United Arab Emirates Women won by 86 runs
Terdthai Cricket Ground, Bangkok
Umpires: Vinay Kumar Jha (Nep) and Sharfuddoula (Ban)
Player of the match: Chamani Seneviratne (UAE)

- United Arab Emirates Women won the toss and elected to bat.

21 February 2019
10:00
Scorecard

Thailand; 124/7 (20 overs)	v	Nepal; 67/8 (20 overs)
Naruemol Chaiwai 32 (27); Nary Thapa 2/15 (4 overs)		Indu Barma 29 (44); Sornnarin Tippoch 2/12 (4 overs)

Thailand Women won by 57 runs
Asian Institute of Technology Ground, Bangkok
Umpires: Akbar Ali (UAE) and Tabarak Dar (HK)
Player of the match: Chanida Sutthiruang (Tha)

- Thailand Women won the toss and elected to bat.

21 February 2019
14:00
Scorecard

Kuwait; 59/9 (20 overs)	v	China; 60/1 (11.3 overs)
Siobhan Gomez 11 (12); Liu Jie 2/8 (4 overs)		Zhang Chan 24* (35); Amna Tariq 1/3 (1 over)

China Women won by 9 wickets
Asian Institute of Technology Ground, Bangkok
Umpires: Akbar Ali (UAE) and Durga Subedi (Nep)
Player of the match: Zhang Chan (Chn)

- China Women won the toss and elected to field.
- Chen Yue (Chn) and Iqra Ishaq (Kuw) both made their WT20I debuts.

=== Round 4 ===
22 February 2019
10:00
Scorecard

United Arab Emirates; 41 (17.3 overs)	v	Nepal; 45/3 (10.2 overs)
Chamani Seneviratna 13 (29); Nary Thapa 4/6 (3.3 overs)		Rubina Chhetry 18* (17); Esha Oza 2/15 (3 overs)

Nepal Women won by 7 wickets
Terdthai Cricket Ground, Bangkok
Umpires: Tabarak Dar (HK) and Viswanadan Kalidas (Mas)
Player of the match: Nary Thapa (Nep)

- United Arab Emirates Women won the toss and elected to bat.
- Apsari Begam (Nep) made her WT20I debut.

22 February 2019
10:00
Scorecard

Thailand; 105/3 (20 overs)	v	Hong Kong; 23 (17.1 overs)
Naruemol Chaiwai 57 (58); Chan Ka Man 1/7 (4 overs)		Yasmin Daswani 7 (44); Nattaya Boochatham 4/3 (3.1 overs)

Thailand Women won by 82 runs
Asian Institute of Technology Ground, Bangkok
Umpires: Sharfuddoula (Ban) and Durga Subedi (Nep)
Player of the match: Naruemol Chaiwai (Tha)

- Thailand Women won the toss and elected to bat.

22 February 2019
14:00
Scorecard

Malaysia; 63/9 (20 overs)	v	China; 64/2 (12.1 overs)
Zumika Azmi 17* (23); Liu Jie 2/13 (4 overs); Han Lili 2/13 (4 overs)		Huang Zhuo 25* (30); Winifred Duraisingam 1/8 (3 overs)

China Women won by 8 wickets
Terdthai Cricket Ground, Bangkok
Umpires: Tabarak Dar (HK) and Vinay Kumar Jha (Nep)
Player of the match: Fengfeng Song (Chn)

- Malaysia Women won the toss and elected to bat.

=== Round 5 ===
24 February 2019
10:00
Scorecard

United Arab Emirates; 95/9 (20 overs)	v	China; 68 (19.5 overs)
Chamani Seneviratne 32 (37); Wu Juan 2/12 (3 overs)		Han Lili 19 (16); Shubha Venkataraman 3/2 (4 overs)

United Arab Emirates Women won by 27 runs
Terdthai Cricket Ground, Bangkok
Umpires: Vinay Kumar Jha (Nep) and Sharfuddoula (Ban)
Player of the match: Shubha Venkataraman (UAE)

- China Women won the toss and elected to field.

24 February 2019
10:00
Scorecard

Kuwait; 38 (16.3 overs)	v	Thailand; 41/1 (7.2 overs)
Siobhan Gomez 6 (5); Sornnarin Tippoch 4/8 (4 overs)		Naruemol Chaiwai 14* (20); Amna Tariq 1/6 (1 over)

Thailand Women won by 9 wickets
Asian Institute of Technology Ground, Bangkok
Umpires: Viswanadan Kalidas (Mas) and Durga Subedi (Nep)
Player of the match: Sornnarin Tippoch (Tha)

- Kuwait Women won the toss and elected to bat.
- Soraya Lateh (Tha) made her WT20I debut.

24 February 2019
14:00
Scorecard

Hong Kong; 62/8 (20 overs)	v	Nepal; 63/6 (18.3 overs)
Marina Lamplough 19 (24); Nary Thapa 6/8 (4 overs)		Apsari Begam 24 (35); Jasmine Titmuss 3/11 (3.3 overs)

Nepal Women won by 4 wickets
Asian Institute of Technology Ground, Bangkok
Umpires: Akbar Ali (UAE) and Viswanadan Kalidas (Mas)
Player of the match: Nary Thapa (Nep)

- Hong Kong Women won the toss and elected to bat.
- Nary Thapa (Nep) took her first five-wicket haul in WT20Is.

=== Round 6 ===
25 February 2019
10:00
Scorecard

Thailand; 114/5 (20 overs)	v	Malaysia; 27 (16 overs)
Naruemol Chaiwai 64* (66); Winifred Duraisingam 2/17 (4 overs)		Ainna Hamizah Hashim 5* (27); Sornnarin Tippoch 2/12 (4 overs)

Thailand Women won by 87 runs
Terdthai Cricket Ground, Bangkok
Umpires: Sharfuddoula (Ban) and Durga Subedi (Nep)
Player of the match: Naruemol Chaiwai (Tha)

- Malaysia Women won the toss and elected to field.

25 February 2019
14:00
Scorecard

Nepal; 77/9 (20 overs)	v	China; 72/6 (20 overs)
Kajal Shrestha 18 (32); Wang Meng 2/13 (4 overs)		Zhang Mei 33 (39); Sita Magar 3/19 (4 overs)

Nepal Women won by 5 runs
Terdthai Cricket Ground, Bangkok
Umpires: Viswanadan Kalidas (Mas) and Sharfuddoula (Ban)
Player of the match: Sita Magar (Nep)

- China Women won the toss and elected to field.

25 February 2019
14:00
Scorecard

Kuwait; 25 (10 overs)	v	Hong Kong; 26/1 (6.1 overs)
Priyada Murali 12 (18); Mehreen Yousaf 3/0 (1 over)		Yasmin Daswani 13* (17); Priyada Murali 1/2 (1 over)

Hong Kong Women won by 9 wickets
Asian Institute of Technology Ground, Bangkok
Umpires: Akbar Ali (UAE) and Vinay Kumar Jha (Nep)
Player of the match: Mehreen Yousaf (HK)

- Hong Kong Women won the toss and elected to field.

=== Round 7 ===
27 February 2019
10:00
Scorecard

Malaysia; 85/6 (20 overs)	v	Hong Kong; 86/5 (19.5 overs)
Christina Baret 21 (40); Kary Chan 3/11 (4 overs)		Yasmin Daswani 31 (57); Winifred Duraisingam 3/10 (4 overs)

Hong Kong Women by 5 wickets
Terdthai Cricket Ground, Bangkok
Umpires: Viswanadan Kalidas (Mas) and Durga Subedi (Nep)
Player of the match: Kary Chan (HKG)

- Hong Kong Women won the toss and elected to field.

27 February 2019
10:00
Scorecard

Nepal; 116/7 (20 overs)	v	Kuwait; 86/9 (20 overs)
Bindu Rawal 28* (49); Priyada Murali 2/19 (3 overs)		Maryam Omar 29 (36); Karuna Bhandari 3/12 (4 overs)

Nepal Women won by 30 runs
Asian Institute of Technology Ground, Bangkok
Umpires: Akbar Ali (UAE) and Tabarak Dar (HK)
Player of the match: Rubina Chhetry (Nep)

- Kuwait Women won the toss and elected to field.
- Rubina Chhetry (Nep) took a hat-trick.

27 February 2019
14:00
Scorecard

Thailand; 107/8 (20 overs)	v	United Arab Emirates; 57 (19.2 overs)
Natthakan Chantam 35 (30); Shubha Venkataraman 3/20 (4 overs)		Udeni Dona 13 (26); Sornnarin Tippoch 2/4 (4 overs)

Thailand Women won by 50 runs
Asian Institute of Technology Ground, Bangkok
Umpires: Tabarak Dar (HK) and Vinay Kumar Jha (Nep)

- Thailand Women won the toss and elected to bat.
