= Puja Mahato =

Nepali cricketer (born 2006)

Personal information
- Full name: Puja Mahato
- Born: 17 February 2006 (age 20); Mahottari, Nepal
- Batting: Right handed
- Bowling: Right-arm medium
- Role: All-rounder

International information
- National side: Nepal
- T20I debut (cap 28): 22 August 2023 v Hong Kong
- Last T20I: 28 May 2026 v Indonesia

Domestic team information
- Years: Team
- 2022-present: Madhesh Province

Career statistics
Competition	T20I
Matches	26
Runs scored	319
Batting average	18.76
100s/50s	0/2
Top score	62*
Balls bowled	372
Wickets	19
Bowling average	15.57
5 wickets in innings	0
10 wickets in match	0
Best bowling	3/2
Catches/stumpings	2/–
- Source: Cricinfo, 21 February 2025

Puja Mahato (Nepali: पुजा महतो; born 17 February 2006) is a Nepalese cricketer who plays for the Nepal women's national cricket team.

She trained under coach, Sharvan Kumar in Rohtak Road Gymkhana Cricket Academy.

== International career ==
She made her Twenty20 International (T20I) debut against Hong Kong women's in the Women's T20 Quadrangular Series 2023.

In June 2024, she was named in national squad for the 2024 Women's Twenty20 Asia Cup. In November 2024, she was appointed as captain of under-19 team for the 2025 ICC Under-19 Women's T20 World Cup qualification. On 12 November, she scored a unbeaten century (130) and took a five-wicket haul (5/8) to defeat Kuwait under-19 women's cricket team by 165 runs. Under her captaincy Nepal qualified to 2025 Under-19 Women's T20 World Cup. Under her captaincy Nepal won the first ever match in Under-19 Women's World Cup in 2025 against the host Malaysia.

== See also ==
- Nepal national men's cricket team
- Nepal national women's cricket team
- Nepal women's national under-19 cricket team
