= Sony Pakhrin =

Nepali cricketer

Personal information
- Full name: Sony Pakhrin
- Born: 2 November 2007 (age 19); Bagmati, Nepal
- Batting: Right handed
- Bowling: Right-arm medium
- Role: All-rounder

International information
- National side: Nepal
- T20I debut (cap 33): 18 November 2023 v Japan
- Last T20I: 19 November 2023 v Japan

Domestic team information
- Years: Team
- 2022-present: Bagmati Province

Career statistics
Competition	WT20I
Matches	2
Runs scored	0
Batting average	0.00
100s/50s	0/0
Top score	0
Balls bowled	30
Wickets	1
Bowling average	10.00
5 wickets in innings	0
10 wickets in match	0
Best bowling	1/2
Catches/stumpings	0/–
- Source: Cricinfo, 1 January 2025

Sony Pakhrin (Nepali: साेनी पाख्रिन; born 2 November 2007) is a Nepalese cricketer who plays for the Nepal women's national cricket team.

She has been serving as the Nepal under-19 vice captain of the team since 23 October 2024. She began playing cricket at a young age. She quickly rose through the ranks and was selected to represent the Bagmati. She has been a key player in the team's success in various tournaments.

== International career ==
She made her Twenty20 International (T20I) debut against Japan women's team during the Women's T20 Quadrangular Series held at Wong Nai.
