= Suman Khatiwada =

Nepalese cricketer (born 1999)

Personal information
- Born: 7 August 1999 (age 27); Nepal
- Batting: Right handed
- Bowling: Right-arm medium

International information
- National side: Nepal
- Only T20I (cap 18): 7 December 2019 v Maldives

Career statistics
Competition	WT20I
Matches	1
Runs scored	–
Batting average	–
100s/50s	–/–
Top score	–
Balls bowled	12
Wickets	1
Bowling average	1.00
5 wickets in innings	0
10 wickets in match	0
Best bowling	1/1
Catches/stumpings	0/0
Medal record
Representing Nepal
Women's Cricket
South Asian Games
Bronze medal – third place	2019 Kathmandu/Pokhara	Team
- Source: Cricinfo, 18 November 2021

Suman Khatiwada (Nepali: सुमन खतिवडा, born 7 August 1999) is a Nepali cricketer who plays for the Nepali national women's team.

In November 2019, she was named in Nepal's squad for the women's tournament at the 2019 South Asian Games. She made her Women's Twenty20 International (WT20I) debut for Nepal, against the Maldives, on 7 December 2019 in the third-place playoff Bronze medal match of the tournament.
