= Sita Rana Magar =

Nepali cricketer (born 1992)

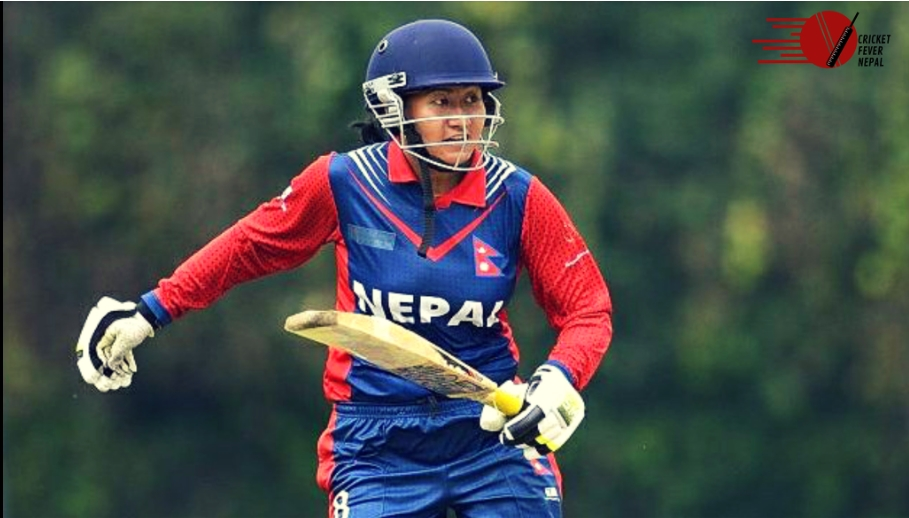

Personal information
- Full name: Sita Rana Magar
- Born: 5 March 1992 (age 34); Nepal
- Batting: Left-handed
- Bowling: Left-arm medium-fast
- Role: All-rounder

International information
- National side: Nepal
- T20I debut (cap 6): 12 January 2019 v China
- Last T20I: 23 July 2024 v India

Career statistics
Competition	WT20I
Matches	56
Runs scored	914
Batting average	21.25
100s/50s	0/1
Top score	82*
Balls bowled	935
Wickets	52
Bowling average	12.98
5 wickets in innings	1
10 wickets in match	0
Best bowling	5/16
Catches/stumpings	16/0
Medal record
Representing Nepal
Women's Cricket
South Asian Games
Bronze medal – third place	2019 Kathmandu/Pokhara	Team
- Source: Cricinfo, 8 October 2024

Sita Rana Magar (Nepali: सीता राना मगर; born 5 March 1992) is a Nepali cricketer who plays for the women's national cricket team as a left-handed batting all-rounder. She has also been the vice captain of the team.

== Early life and education ==
Magar was raised in Nepalgunj, a sub-metropolitan city in Banke District, on the Terai plains. From a young age, she was a "complete sports fanatic", always involved in some sport or another at school.

At first, football was Magar's favourite sport, and she dreamed of becoming a footballer. Then, when she was a 13 year old 7th-grader, women's cricket was introduced to Nepal, and her teachers encouraged her to take up the game, particularly as she had the advantage of being left-handed.

Magar started out as a member of her school cricket team. She was then selected for the Nepalgunj regional team. Eventually, when she participated in Nepal's first ever women's cricket tournament, she emerged as the leading bowler.

At that time, according to Magar, playing women's cricket in Nepal was a huge challenge. There were no training centres, and due to social pressure, Nepali girls rarely wished to take up cricket. Although Magar's mother was always very supportive of her cricketing activities, her father was initially reluctant. As Magar explained to All Over Cricket in 2022:

"Being a girl in Nepal, our mothers and fathers wanted us to work at home so that in future when we marry, it will be easy for us [to find a husband] ..."

Magar's father also initially believed that a woman could not make a living out of playing sports. However, Magar was soon recognised in her neighbourhood for her cricketing skill and achievements, and people started referring to her father as 'Sita's father'. That led him to change his stance.

Magar's cricketing role model is Gyanendra Malla, a former captain of the Nepal men's cricket team.

== Domestic career ==
Prior to the late 2010s, there was not much top level domestic cricket in Nepal, as the country did not have a well-planned domestic structure for the women's game. By Magar's own account, the biggest issue in women's cricket in Nepal has been the lack of domestic tournaments.

In 2018, Magar played for the championship-winning Armed Police Force (APF) team in that year's Prime Minister Cup Women's National Tournament. During that tournament, she topped her team's averages, with an average of 85 and a top score of 44* from five innings, in four of which she was unbeaten. Importantly, she was also one of the unbeaten pair of top scorers for her team in the final.

The following year, 2019, Magar was selected as the marquee player of Dhangadhi Wonder Women, which was to have been one of four teams competing in an NCL Women's T20 Cricket League tournament later that year. However, the tournament was postponed twice and did not go ahead.

A replacement tournament, the Women's Champions League, was organised for October 2019. Magar was appointed as captain and marquee player of Pokhara Paltan, one of the five teams competing in the tournament. Magar played well during that tournament, in particular by scoring 65* in 56 balls in her team's third match, against Chitwan Rhinos, but the team was eliminated after losing all three of its matches.

On 3 January 2021, Magar captained the beaten runner-up APF team in the final of the 2020 Prime Minister Cup Women's National Tournament, which attracted the largest number of attendees ever at a women's cricket match in Nepal. Her team-leading bowling figures, of 3/17, were not enough to prevent the Province No. 1 team from winning, by just 6 runs. In the final of the next PM Cup Women's tournament, held on 26 December 2021, she again captained the APF team, this time to victory by 7 wickets.

== International career ==
=== 2007–13: Early days for Magar and Nepal ===
Magar made her international debut on 12 July 2007, as part of the first-ever Nepali women's national cricket team, in the team's first ever match, against Thailand, at the 2007 ACC Women's Tournament in Johor Bahru, Malaysia. Two days later, in the team's gripping second match, against Malaysia, she was the not out batter when Nepal lost its tenth wicket with the scores tied. The Nepali players then achieved a shock seven wicket victory over Hong Kong to secure a place for Nepal in the final, in which their team finished as runner-up to Bangladesh.

Even after Magar had begun playing the game internationally, she was not as enthusiastic about cricket as she was about football. Only after about three years playing in international matches, and in particular as a member of Nepal's back-to-back ACC U-19 Women's Championship-winning teams in 2008 and 2010, did she start taking cricket more seriously.

Magar then played for the national team at the 2010 Asian Games in Guangzhou, Guangdong, China, in November 2010, at the 2011 ACC Women's Twenty20 Championship in Kuwait in February 2011, and at the 2012 ACC Women's Twenty20 Asia Cup in Guangzhou, China, in October 2012.

In Magar's and the team's next tournament, the 2013 ACC Women's Championship, held in January 2013 in a 25-overs a side format in Chiang Mai Province, Thailand, Magar top scored with 46 in 48 balls against the United Arab Emirates, the highest score yet for Nepal's women in an international match. The team ended up winning all four of its group stage matches, but was then eliminated by Thailand in the first semi-final.

=== 2014–18: Progress but then turmoil ===
In February 2014, Magar played in the 40-over a side 2014 ACC Women's Premier tournament in Chiang Mai, Thailand. In Nepal's first match of the tournament, against Iran, she scored 72 from 94 balls, took 4/5, and was player of the match, which Nepal won by 221 runs. Her score was the highest yet for Nepal's women, as was her 107 run partnership with Sarita Magar for the second wicket, and her 10 fours was the most scored for the team to that date, in an innings by an individual. The team's total of 284/6 was the highest ever at an ACC women's tournament, as was its winning margin of runs.

A report of the match praised Magar's "impressive timing and placement" while batting, and described her as "... the classiest batter in the Nepali side and ... very strong on the leg-side." However, Nepal won only one other match in the tournament, against Bhutan, and finished in fourth position.

Later that year, Magar took the field in the women's T20 tournament at the 2014 Asian Games in Incheon, South Korea. In Nepal's second match, against Malaysia, she scored 18 from 41 balls to make a significant contribution to the team's 46 run victory. In the fourth quarter final, against Bangladesh, she took 2/24, and a catch, but Nepal was then eliminated after a poor batting performance.

Meanwhile, cricket in Nepal was undergoing off-field turmoil. In November 2014, the Nepali government dissolved the committee of the Cricket Association of Nepal (CAN) and replaced it with an ad hoc committee on an interim basis. In April 2016, the International Cricket Council (ICC) suspended CAN's membership of the ICC because of the government's interference in CAN's board. Although the ICC also decided that Nepal teams could continue to compete in ICC events, an important effect of the suspension of CAN was that ICC funding to cricket in Nepal was cut off. Magar has since said that an additional effect of the suspension was weak management of cricket in Nepal, including communication problems.

In November/December 2016, Magar played in the 2016 Women's Twenty20 Asia Cup, held in Bangkok, Thailand. In Nepal's match against Bangladesh, she top scored for her team with 15 in 14 balls, but none of her teammates reached double figures, and Nepal lost the match by 92 runs. After losing all of its other matches, and finishing last, in that tournament, Nepal did not participate in the next Asia Cup, held in Kuala Lumpur, Malaysia, in June 2018.

=== 2019–present: Nepal's WT20I era ===
On 12 January 2019, Magar made her WT20I debut for Nepal in the team's first ever WT20I, against China in the Thailand Women's T20 Smash tournament in Bangkok, Thailand. Nepal won that match, by 10 wickets. Two days later, against the United Arab Emirates, Magar top scored with 37 from 35 balls and was named as player of the match. Then, in the first semi-final, against Indonesia, she again top scored, with 48 from 62 balls. Although that was the highest individual score yet recorded for Nepal in a WT20I, Magar was pipped for player of the match by her captain, Rubina Chhetry, who took 4/2 during Indonesia's innings. Nepal won that match by 92 runs, its highest winning WT20I margin to date by number of runs, but lost the ensuing final to Thailand by 70 runs.

The following month, Magar was player of the tournament in the 2019 ICC Women's Qualifier Asia, also in Bangkok, Thailand. The event was an Asia region qualifier for the 2019 ICC Women's World Twenty20 Qualifier as well as the 2020 Women's Cricket World Cup Qualifier, with the winner progressing to both of the further Qualifier tournaments. Magar's top score for the tournament was a player of the match-winning 42 against Malaysia, and her best bowling performance, 3/19 against China, was another player of the match-winner. Nepal finished the tournament as runner-up to Thailand.

In late 2019, the ICC lifted its suspension of CAN's ICC membership. By then, CAN had appointed Nepal's first ever dedicated women's national team coach, who had arranged for the men's team's physical trainer also to support the women's team. "In my 15-year-long career, I had never known the impact a physical trainer could have on a player's life," Magar told The Annapurna Express.

In September 2020, CAN announced its first award of central contracts for female players. Magar was one of six women contracted as grade "A" players.

In mid-November 2021, Magar starred in a three match bilateral series between Nepal and Qatar in Doha, Qatar. In the first match, she scored 39 in 33 balls, but lost her record for Nepal's highest WT20I score to Indu Barma, who made 55. Nepal won the match by 119 runs, the team's largest WT20I winning margin yet by number of runs. After being rested for the second match, Magar promptly returned to the head of Nepal's WT20I top scoring table, by making a player of the match-winning 82* in the third match. Nepal won the series 3–0.

The following week, Magar was player of the tournament in the 2021 ICC Women's T20 World Cup Asia Qualifier, held in the United Arab Emirates. In Nepal's first match, against Hong Kong, she top scored for her team with 40* in 58 balls, but Hong Kong won the match by six wickets. In her team's next match, against Bhutan, she took a player of the match-winning 3/10 in Nepal's eight wicket victory. Three days later, against Malaysia, she was again player of the match, with 30 in 38 balls and 1/16. Nepal finished the Qualifier in third place, with three wins from five matches.

In the first half of May 2022, Magar played seven matches for the tournament-winning Tornadoes team at the privately run 2022 FairBreak Invitational T20 in Dubai, United Arab Emirates. Her best batting performance was only 18* in the round robin match against the Falcons team, and best bowling figures were a modest 1/18 in the second semi-final against the Barmy Army team. However, she also caused a stir by making a distinctive hand gesture underneath her face to celebrate each of the wickets she took. The gesture, dubbed the "Pushpa" in honour of an Indian film, Pushpa: The Rise, had previously been used by Indian men's team captain Virat Kohli.

While preparing for the final of that tournament, Magar found out, from a media report, that she had been replaced as vice captain of the Nepal team. Nevertheless, she returned to Nepal immediately after the final, to play in the last four matches of a five-match bilateral WT20I series against Uganda, at Tribhuvan University International Cricket Ground in Kirtipur, Nepal. Uganda won the series 3–2; Magar's best performance was 17 in 24 balls and 2/15 in the final match, which Nepal won by 33 runs.

== Off the field ==
=== Professional life ===
Magar works as a police officer for Nepal's Armed Police Force (APF). She was appointed to that role on the strength of her cricketing skills. The APF employs more than 500 players of various sports. As a general rule, it gives priority to sports, but at times its employees are asked also to focus on national security.

=== Personal life ===
Magar's husband is supportive of her sporting activities. A former boxer with an elder sister and brother who are boxers, he does all the housework when Magar is practising, and cooks when she is training. He has also told her that they can have a baby when she is done with her cricketing career.

== See also ==
- List of Nepal women Twenty20 International cricketers
