= Bindu Rawal =

Nepali cricketer (born 1996)

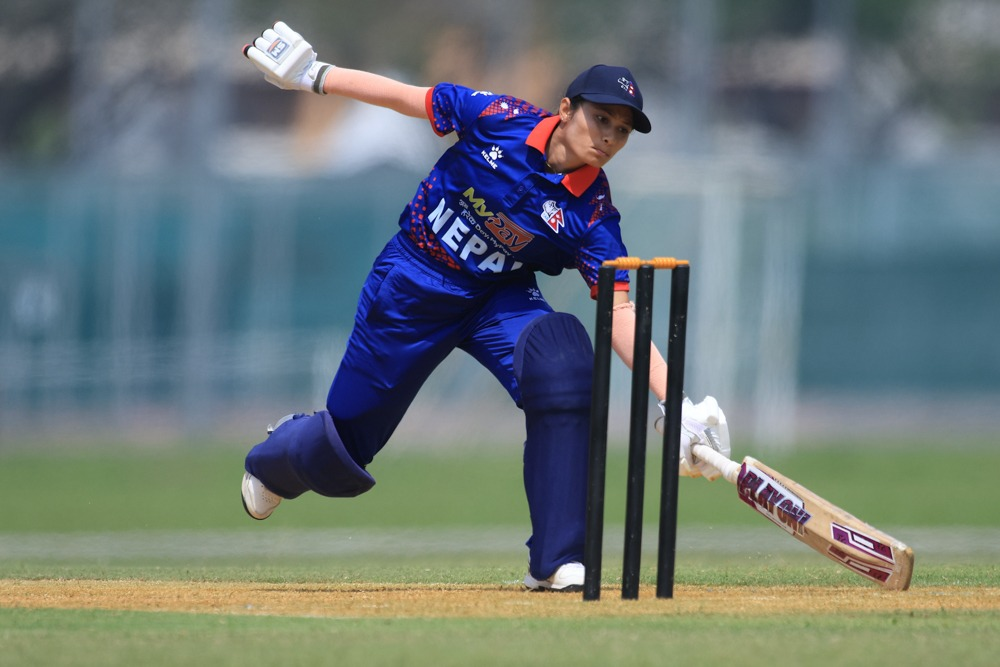

Personal information
- Full name: Bindu Rawal
- Born: 11 June 1996 (age 30); Kanchanpur, Nepal
- Batting: Left-handed
- Role: Batter

International information
- National side: Nepal
- T20I debut (cap 9): 12 January 2019 v China
- Last T20I: 23 July 2024 v India
- Source: Cricinfo, 8 October 2024

Bindu Rawal (Nepali: विन्दु रावल, born 11 June 1996) is a Nepalese cricketer who plays for the Nepal women's national cricket team. Bindu Rawal serves as the vice-captain of the team.

== International career ==
On 12 January 2019, She made her T20I debut against China at the Thailand Women's T20 Smash. She also represented Nepal in the 2019 ICC Women's Qualifier Asia in Bangkok, Thailand. This tournament was the part of Asia region qualifier for the 2019 ICC Women's World Twenty20 Qualifier as well as the 2020 Women's Cricket World Cup Qualifier tournaments, with the top team progressing to both of them.
