= Asmina Karmacharya =

Nepali cricketer (born 2000)

Ashmina Karmacharya
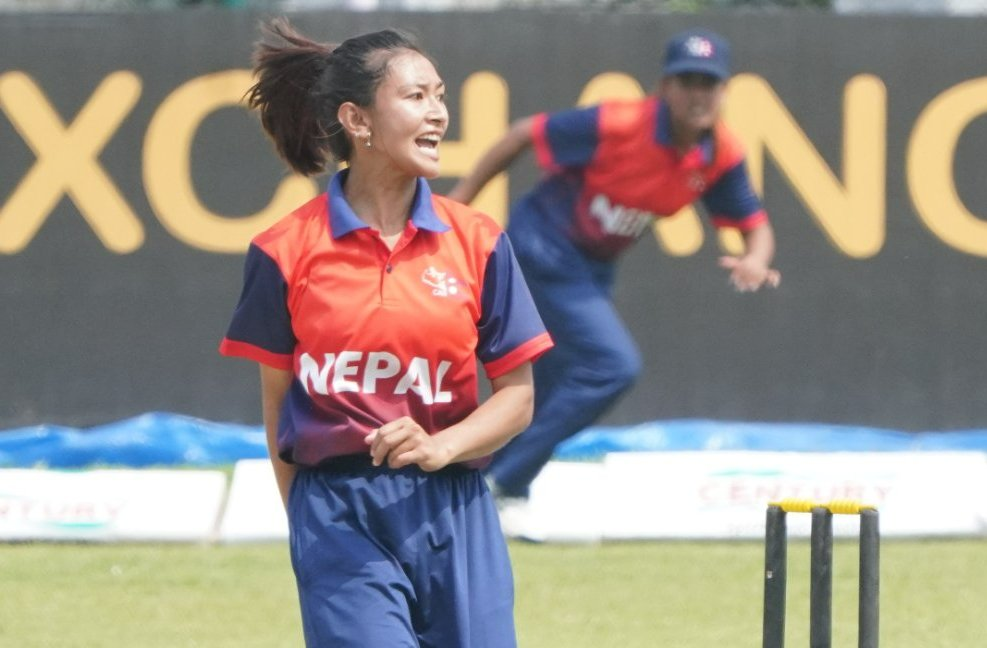

Personal information
- Full name: Ashmina Karmacharya
- Born: 28 April 2000 (age 26); Nepal
- Batting: Right handed
- Bowling: Right arm medium

International information
- National side: Nepal
- T20I debut (cap 23): 16 May 2022 v Uganda
- Last T20I: 14 February 2024 v Kuwait
- Source: Cricinfo, 8 October 2024

Ashmina Karmacharya (Nepali: अस्मिना कर्मचार्य, born 28 April 2000) is a Nepalese cricketer who plays for the Nepal women's national cricket team.

== Playing career ==
In May 2022, Karmacharya was named in Nepal women's Twenty20 International (T20I) squads for their series against Uganda. She made her T20I debut for Nepal against Uganda on 16 May 2022. She also represented Nepal for 2022 ACC Women's T20 Championship that was held in Malaysia.
