= Sangita Rai =

Nepalese cricketer (born 2000)

Personal information
- Full name: Sangita Rai
- Born: 24 February 2000 (age 26); Jhapa, Nepal
- Batting: Right handed
- Bowling: Right arm offbreak
- Role: Batter

International information
- National side: Nepal
- T20I debut (cap 20): 16 November 2021 v Qatar
- Last T20I: 16 February 2024 v Malaysia
- Source: Cricinfo, 8 October 2024

Sangita Rai (Nepali: संगीता राई, born 24 February 2000, Jhapa, Nepal) is a Nepalese cricketer who plays for Nepal women's national cricket team.

== International career ==
In October 2021, She was named in Nepal's side for the 2021 ICC Women's T20 World Cup Asia Qualifier tournament in the United Arab Emirates. On 16 November 2021, She made her T20I debut against Qatar in the Nepal women's tour of Qatar.
