= Jyoti Pandey =

Nepalese cricketer (born 1997)

Personal information
- Full name: Jyoti Pandey
- Born: 7 February 1997 (age 29); Nepal
- Batting: Right handed
- Role: Wicketkeeper

International information
- National side: Nepal
- T20I debut (cap 21): 17 November 2021 v Qatar
- Last T20I: 4 June 2023 v Malaysia

Career statistics
Competition	WT20I
Matches	17
Runs scored	210
Batting average	19.09
100s/50s	0/0
Top score	49
Catches/stumpings	4/2
- Source: Cricinfo, 8 October 2024

Jyoti Pandey (Nepali: ज्योती पाण्डे, born 7 February 1997, Nepal) is a Nepalese cricketer who plays for Nepal women's national cricket team.

== Career ==
In October 2021, She was named in Nepal's side for the 2021 ICC Women's T20 World Cup Asia Qualifier tournament in the United Arab Emirates. She made her T20I debut against Qatar in the Nepal women's tour of Qatar on 17 November 2021.
