= List of Nepal women Twenty20 International cricketers =

This is a list of Nepal women Twenty20 International cricketers. A Twenty20 International is an international cricket match between two representative teams. A Twenty20 International is played under the rules of Twenty20 cricket. In April 2018, the International Cricket Council (ICC) granted full international status to Twenty20 women's matches played between member sides from 1 July 2018 onwards. The Nepal women's team made their Twenty20 International debut on 12 January 2019 against China in Bangkok during the 2019 Thailand Women's T20 Smash.

The list is arranged in the order in which each player won her first Twenty20 cap. Where more than one player won her first Twenty20 cap in the same match, those players are listed alphabetically by surname.

== Key ==
General

- ‡ – Captain
- † – Wicket-keeper
- First – Year of debut
- Last – Year of latest game
- Mat – Number of matches played

Batting

- Runs – Runs scored in career
- HS – Highest score
- Avg – Runs scored per dismissal
- * – Batsman remained not out
- 50 – Number of half centuries

Bowling

- Wkt – Wickets taken in career
- BBI – Best bowling in an innings
- Ave – Average runs per wicket

Fielding

- Ca – Catches taken
- St – Stumpings affected

== Players ==
Statistics are correct as of 10 June 2026.

Nepal women T20I cricketers
General					Batting					Bowling				Fielding		Ref
No.	Name	First	Last	Mat	Runs	HS	Avg	50	100	Balls	Wkt	BBI	Ave	Ca	St	Ref
1	Rubina Chhetry‡	2019	2026	100	1100	118*	18.64	1	1	1,485	67	4/2	16.17	40	0	
2	Dolly Bhatta	2019	2024	21	91	25	7.58	0	0	–	–	–	–	2	0	
3	Karuna Bhandari	2019	2021	21	9	4	2.25	0	0	348	17	3/9	12.00	6	0	
4	Kabita Kunwar	2019	2026	83	510	33	10.85	0	0	1,485	79	6/5	12.93	20	0	
5	Sarita Magar	2019	2026	25	118	22	9.83	0	0	183	8	4/11	17.75	6	0	
6	Sita Rana Magar	2019	2026	77	1078	82*	20.73	1	0	1,329	66	5/12	15.87	18	0	
7	Nary Thapa	2019	2019	11	63	19	12.60	0	0	219	17	6/8	7.17	3	0	
8	Bindu Rawal	2019	2026	58	463	44	12.51	0	0	–	–	–	–	10	0	
9	Roma Thapa	2019	2026	40	144	22	9.60	0	0	–	–	–	–	5	2	
10	Kajal Shrestha†	2019	2026	50	307	32	10.23	0	0	–	–	–	–	13	15	
11	Indu Barma‡	2019	2026	100	1,322	55*	18.61	1	0	829	41	3/5	15.51	36	0	
12	Mamta Chaudhary†	2019	2025	16	43	9*	4.30	0	0	–	–	–	–	2	1	
13	Sonu Khadka	2019	2019	9	12	12	12.00	0	0	78	3	2/6	22.66	1	0	
14	Aarati Bidari	2019	2019	2	0	0*	–	0	0	36	0	–	–	0	0	
15	Apsari Begam	2019	2024	35	143	24	11.91	0	0	6	1	–	–	1	0	
16	Anjali Chand	2019	2019	3	0	0	0.00	0	0	43	10	6/0	0.40	1	0	
17	Saraswati Kumari	2019	2023	10	0	0*	–	0	0	126	6	4/8	14.83	2	0	
18	Suman Khatiwada	2019	2019	1	–	–	–	–	–	12	1	1/1	1.00	0	0	
19	Kabita Joshi	2021	2026	67	319	31*	9.96	0	0	647	22	2/5	26.00	15	0	
20	Sangita Rai	2021	2024	15	9	4	4.50	0	0	249	20	5/6	9.85	3	0	
21	Jyoti Pandey†	2021	2023	17	210	49	19.09	0	0	–	–	–	–	4	2	
22	Sabnam Rai	2021	2025	16	4	2	4.00	0	0	275	11	2/3	24.27	1	0	
23	Asmina Karmacharya	2022	2024	23	17	6	2.12	0	0	293	18	5/10	12.55	4	0	
24	Hiranmayee Roy	2022	2022	2	0	0	0.00	0	0	42	3	2/11	9.33	0	0	
25	Kritika Marasini	2023	2024	4	0	0*	–	0	0	24	1	1/15	35.00	1	0	
26	Samjhana Khadka	2023	2026	63	728	72*	14.00	1	0	–	–	–	–	13	0	
27	Ishwori Bist	2023	2025	14	22	17*	11.00	0	0	240	11	3/40	21.54	2	0	
28	Puja Mahato	2023	2026	64	859	62*	17.18	4	0	869	42	3/2	18.11	7	0	
29	Khusi Dangol	2023	2023	10	2	1*	2.00	0	0	118	9	3/20	10.22	0	0	
30	Rubi Poddar†	2023	2026	27	216	51*	12.00	0	0	–	–	–	–	5	7	
31	Somu Bist	2023	2026	11	6	3	2.00	0	0	192	5	2/18	34.50	0	0	
32	Kanchan Shrestha	2023	2023	1	1	1	1.00	0	0	–	–	–	–	0	0	
33	Sony Pakhrin	2023	2026	11	110	29	13.75	0	0	30	1	1/2	10.00	1	0	
34	Manisha Upadhyay	2025	2026	27	7	3*	2.33	0	0	558	36	4/17	11.97	1	0	
35	Alisha Yadav†	2025	2025	8	26	9	5.20	0	0	–	–	–	–	4	1	
36	Rewati Dhami	2025	2025	1	2	2*	–	0	0	6	0	–	–	0	0	
37	Rachana Chaudhary	2025	2026	19	11	5*	2.75	0	0	358	14	3/12	20.35	3	0	
38	Rajmati Airee	2025	2025	10	40	20*	20.00	0	0	96	8	3/17	11.87	2	0	
39	Riya Sharma	2025	2026	38	19	4*	2.37	0	0	699	31	3/20	20.06	12	0	
40	Sana Praveen	2025	2025	5	64	31	16.00	0	0	–	–	–	–	2	0	
41	Sabitri Dhami	2025	2025	2	1	1	1.00	0	0	–	–	–	–	0	0	
42	Yashoda Bist	2025	2025	1	7	7	7.00	0	0	–	–	–	–	0	0	
43	Anu Kadayat	2026	2026	2	–	–	–	–	–	12	0	–	–	1	0	
44	Seemana KC	2026	2026	3	–	–	–	–	–	30	0	–	–	0	0	

== Captains ==
No.	Name	First	Last	Matches	Won	Lost	Tied	No Result	Win%
1	Rubina Chhetry	2019	2023	46	32	13	0	1	71.11
2	Indu Barma	2023	2026	56	27	29	0	0	48.21
