= Sabnam Rai =

Nepalese cricketer

Personal information
- Full name: Sabnam Rai
- Born: 23 August 1999 (age 27); Jhapa, Nepal
- Batting: Right handed
- Role: Right arm offbreak

International information
- National side: Nepal
- T20I debut (cap 22): 17 November 2021 v Qatar
- Last T20I: 23 July 2024 v India
- Source: Cricinfo, 8 October 2024

Sabnam Rai (Nepali: सब्नम राई, born 23 August 1990, Jhapa, Nepal) is a Nepalese cricketer who plays for Nepal women's national cricket team.

In October 2021, She was named in Nepal's side for the 2021 ICC Women's T20 World Cup Asia Qualifier tournament in the United Arab Emirates. She made her T20I debut against Qatar in the Nepal women's tour of Qatar on 17 November 2021.
