= Indu Barma =

Nepalese cricketer (born 1997)

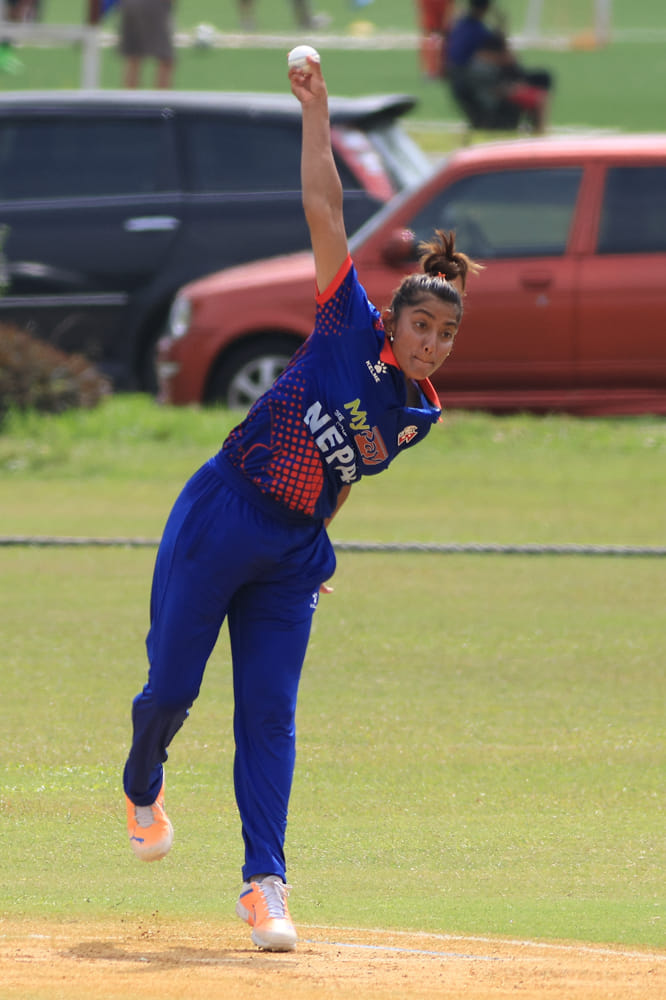

Personal information
- Born: 29 September 1997 (age 29)
- Batting: Right-handed
- Bowling: Right-arm medium

International information
- National side: Nepal (2019–present)
- T20I debut (cap 11): 12 January 2019 v China
- Last T20I: 28 May 2026 v Indonesia

Career statistics
Competition	WT20I
Matches	56
Runs scored	659
Batting average	16.07
100s/50s	0/1
Top score	55*
Balls bowled	555
Wickets	29
Bowling average	13.68
5 wickets in innings	0
10 wickets in match	0
Best bowling	3/5
Catches/stumpings	18/0
Medal record
Representing Nepal
Women's Cricket
South Asian Games
Bronze medal – third place	2019 Kathmandu/Pokhara	Team
- Source: CricInfo, 8 October 2024

Indu Barma (Nepali: इन्दु बर्मा) is a right-hand batter and right-arm medium bowler for the Nepal women's national cricket team. She has been serving as the captain of the team since 9 November 2023, replacing Rubina Chhetry.

== International career ==
Indu was in the playing 11 of the Nepal women first twenty 20 International debut match against China women's national cricket team. She also represented Nepal in the 2019 ICC Women's Qualifier Asia in Bangkok, Thailand. It is a tournament which is an Asia region qualifier for the 2019 ICC Women's World Twenty20 Qualifier as well as the 2020 Women's Cricket World Cup Qualifier tournaments, with the top team progressing to both of them.

In October 2021, she was named in Nepal's side for the 2021 ICC Women's T20 World Cup Asia Qualifier tournament in the United Arab Emirates.

Barma has been appointed as the new captain of the team since 9 November 2023 replacing Nepal's long time captain Rubina Chhetry.

== See also ==
- List of Nepal women Twenty20 International cricketers
