= Apsari Begam =

Nepalese cricketer (born 1999)

Personal information
- Full name: Apsari Begam
- Born: 7 July 1999 (age 27)
- Batting: Right-handed

International information
- National side: Nepal
- T20I debut (cap 15): 22 February 2019 v United Arab Emirates
- Last T20I: 16 February 2024 v Malaysia
Medal record
Representing Nepal
Women's Cricket
South Asian Games
Bronze medal – third place	2019 Kathmandu/Pokhara	Team
- Source: CricInfo, 8 October 2024

Apsari Begam (Nepali: अप्सरी बेगम) (born 7 July 1999) is a Nepali cricketer who plays for the Nepal women's national cricket team.

== International career ==
Apsari Begam had debuted in the international matches for Nepal in the T20I match against United Arab Emirates women's national cricket team on 22 February 2019. The match was the part of the 2019 ICC Women's Qualifier Asia in Bangkok, Thailand. It was a tournament which is an Asia region qualifier for the 2019 ICC Women's World Twenty20 Qualifier as well as the 2020 Women's Cricket World Cup Qualifier tournaments, with the top team progressing to both of them.

In October 2021, she was named in Nepal's side for the 2021 ICC Women's T20 World Cup Asia Qualifier tournament in the United Arab Emirates.
