= Kajal Shrestha =

Nepali cricketer (born 1999)

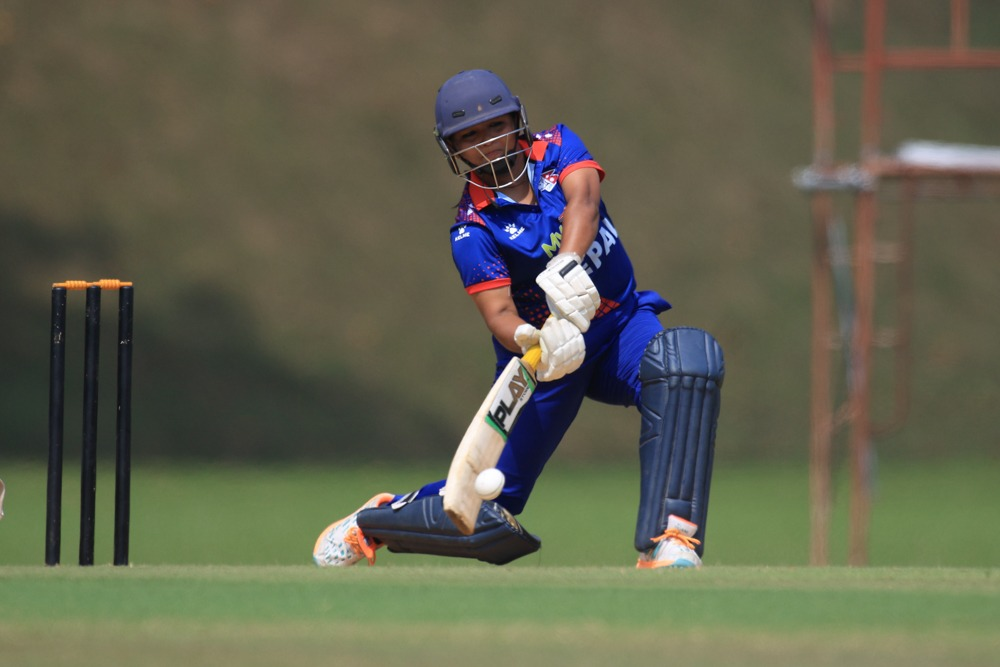

Personal information
- Full name: Kajal Shrestha
- Born: 20 May 1999 (age 27)
- Batting: Right-handed
- Role: Wicket-keeper

International information
- National side: Nepal
- T20I debut (cap 10): 12 January 2019 v China
- Last T20I: 23 July 2024 v India
Medal record
Representing Nepal
Women's Cricket
South Asian Games
Bronze medal – third place	2019 Kathmandu/Pokhara	Team
- Source: Cricinfo, 8 October 2024

Kajal Shrestha (Nepali: काजल श्रेष्ठ) is a Nepali right hand batswoman and a wicketkeeper for the Nepal women's national cricket team.

Kajal was in the playing 11 of the Nepal women first twenty 20 International debut match against China women's national cricket team. She also represented Nepal in the 2019 ICC Women's Qualifier Asia in Bangkok, Thailand. It was a tournament which is an Asia region qualifier for the 2019 ICC Women's World Twenty20 Qualifier as well as the 2020 Women's Cricket World Cup Qualifier tournaments, with the top team progressing to both of them.

In October 2021, she was named in Nepal's side for the 2021 ICC Women's T20 World Cup Asia Qualifier tournament in the United Arab Emirates.
