= Rubina Chhetry =

Nepali cricketer (born 1993)

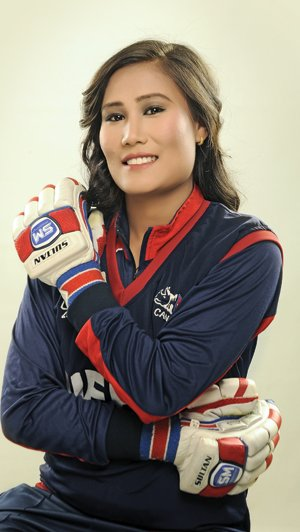

Personal information
- Full name: Rubina Chhetry Belbashi
- Born: 26 November 1993 (age 32); Nepal
- Batting: Right-handed
- Bowling: Right-arm medium
- Role: Bowler

International information
- National side: Nepal
- T20I debut (cap 1): 12 January 2019 v China
- Last T20I: 22 May 2026 v Malaysia

Career statistics
Competition	WT20I
Matches	58
Runs scored	774
Batting average	23.45
100s/50s	1/1
Top score	118*
Balls bowled	1,062
Wickets	42
Bowling average	16.66
5 wickets in innings	0
10 wickets in match	0
Best bowling	4/2
Catches/stumpings	17/0
Medal record
Representing Nepal
Women's Cricket
South Asian Games
Bronze medal – third place	2019 Kathmandu/Pokhara	Team
- Source: Cricinfo, 8 October 2024

Rubina Chhetry (Nepali: रुबिना क्षेत्री; born 26 November 1993) is a Nepali cricketer who plays for the women's national cricket team as a right-arm medium pace bowler. She is the former captain of the team appointed in 2012, when she replaced Nary Thapa. In 2009, she became the first cricketer to take a hat-trick for Nepal in an international match, and in 2019 she took Nepal's first hat-trick in a Women's Twenty20 International (WT20I).

== Early life and education ==
Chhetry hails from Kakkarvitta, a neighbourhood of Mechinagar municipality in the district of Jhapa, eastern Nepal. She was raised by a single mother, and attended North Point School in Jhapa. From early childhood, she was attracted to sports. Initially, she played table tennis and volleyball.

When Chhetry was 12 years old, she first played cricket. Near her home, there was a ground where her brother, Pawan Chhetri, her cousin and other boys from their village would play the game. She would sit close to the balcony of her home and watch them. One day, she accompanied her brother to the ground and joined in. At first, she found cricket difficult, as she was the only girl participating. She often bowled, but seldom batted. Some people in the village complained to her mother, and asked that she not be allowed to play against boys, but her mother and brother always supported her.

Chhetry and her brother also played cricket at school, and she played volleyball there as well. She had difficulty in managing her cricket activities alongside her education and other commitments. However, her family inspired her and respected her decisions. She was also inspired by her role models Rahul Dravid from India and Brett Lee from Australia.

== Domestic career ==
In 2016, Chhetry was recruited as Melbourne Renegades' Associate Rookie for the WBBL 2 tournament in Australia. She considered her time with the Renegades to be "... the best learning experience one can ever get ..." and that practising with the team was "... was like a dream come true ..."

Prior to the late 2010s, Chhetry did not play very much top level domestic cricket in Nepal, as the country did not have a well-planned domestic structure for the women's game. In 2018, she captained the Eastern Region team in that year's Prime Minister Cup Women's National Tournament, and was named woman-of-the-series and best bowler.

In 2019, Chhetry was selected as the captain and marquee player of Bhairahawa Queens, which was to have been one of four teams competing in an NCL Women's T20 Cricket League tournament later that year. However, the tournament was postponed twice and did not go ahead.

A replacement tournament, the Women's Champions League, was organised for October 2019. Chhetri was appointed as captain and marquee player of Kat Queens Kathmandu, one of the five teams competing in the tournament. She led that team into the final, including by scoring 83 against Pokhara Paltan, 35* against Biratnagar Titans, 59* against Lalitpur Falcons, and finally, by taking four wickets for four, and then scoring 34*, in the eliminator against Biratnagar Titans.

Although Kat Queens was then defeated in the final by Chitwan Rhinos, Chhetry was named player of the tournament for her 214 runs and five wickets.

On 3 January 2021, Chhetry captained the Province No. 1 team to victory by six runs in the final of the 2020 Prime Minister Cup Women's National Tournament, which attracted the largest number of attendees ever at a women's cricket match in Nepal. She was also named Player of the Final; she scored 18 runs, shared in an opening partnership of 58, and took 2–14. In the final of the next PM Cup Women's tournament, held on 26 December 2021, she again captained Province No. 1; she also scored 34 runs, and took 3–10. Although that performance was not enough either to win her the player of the match award, or to prevent her team's opponent, Armed Police Force, from winning the final by 7 wickets, she did have the consolation of being named Player of the Series.

== International career ==
Chhetry was selected for the national team as a 15 year old, after playing in a selection competition in Kathmandu. The Nepalgunj team in the competition had eight players who were already in the national team, and was the best of all the teams. Against that team, Chhetry took 6 wickets in 4 overs conceding only 9 runs, a performance that secured national selection for her.

In her international debut on 4 July 2009, against Singapore at Selangor Turf Club, Pandamaran, Malaysia, during the ACC Women's Twenty20 Championship, Chhetry made history while bowling the final over of the match. Nepal, batting first, had scored 79/9. When Chhetry started her over, Singapore needed just two runs to win, with five wickets in hand. Chhetry began with a dot ball, and then took a hat-trick, followed by a wide and two more wickets. She finished with 3-0-12-5, and was awarded player of the match; as the scores were tied at 79 each, the match culminated in a bowl-out, which Nepal won.

The hat-trick was the first for Nepal in any form of international cricket.

Chhetry has been the captain of the national team since 2012, when she replaced Neri Thapa. She first captained Nepal in the 2012 Women's Twenty20 Asia Cup.

On 12 January 2019, Chhetry made her WT20I debut for, and also captained, Nepal in the team's first ever WT20I, against China in the Thailand Women's T20 Smash tournament. Nepal won that match, by 10 wickets. Chhetry also represented Nepal in the 2019 ICC Women's Qualifier Asia in Bangkok, Thailand. The latter tournament was an Asia region qualifier for the 2019 ICC Women's World Twenty20 Qualifier as well as the 2020 Women's Cricket World Cup Qualifier, with the top team progressing to both of the further Qualifier tournaments. On 27 February 2019, in the final round of matches in the Asia qualifier, Chhetry took a hat-trick and was player of the match against Kuwait; it was Nepal's first hat-trick in a WT20I. Nepal finished the tournament in second place, after Thailand.

In September 2020, the Cricket Association of Nepal (CAN) announced its first award of central contracts for female players. Chhetry was one of six women contracted as grade "A" players. She told The Kathmandu Post, "This contract should have been awarded a long time ago, but I would say it's better late than never."

In October 2021, Chhetry was named as the captain of Nepal's side for the 2021 ICC Women's T20 World Cup Asia Qualifier tournament in the United Arab Emirates. In the lead up to that tournament, she was player of the series in a three match bilateral series against Qatar in Qatar.

In early May 2022, Chhetry played two matches for the Barmy Army team at the privately run 2022 FairBreak Invitational T20 in Dubai, United Arab Emirates. In the second half of that month, she captained Nepal in a five-match bilateral WT20I series against Uganda at Tribhuvan University International Cricket Ground in Kirtipur, Nepal. Uganda won the series 3–2; Chhetry's best performance was 18* in 15 balls and 1/15 in the third match, which Uganda won by six wickets.

== Off the field ==
=== Other sports ===
Chhetry has also represented Nepal at the highest level in both table tennis and volleyball.

=== Professional life ===
In the mid-2010s, Chhetry and her brother started up a cricket academy in Jhapa.

== See also ==
- List of Nepal women Twenty20 International cricketers
