= List of Nepal women Twenty20 international records =

This is a list of Nepal women's team Twenty20 International cricket records. It includes the records of team Nepal and player's individual performances in Twenty20 International cricket.

On 26 April 2018, ICC announced that all Twenty20 matches played between ICC members after the cut off date of 1 July 2018 would be awarded Twenty20 International status. Thus, Nepal women played their first Twenty20 International match against China women on 12 January 2019, and these records date from that match.

== Listing criteria ==
In general the top five are listed in each category (except when there is a tie for the last place among the five, in which case, all the tied record holders are noted).

== Team records ==
=== Team wins & losses ===
==== Matches played (total) ====
Team	First match	Matches	Won	Lost	Tie+W	Tie+L	No result	Result %
Nepal	12 January 2019	102	59	42	0	0	1	58.41%
Source: ESPNcricinfo Last updated: 10 June 2026

==== Matches played (by country) ====
Opposition	First match	Matches	Won	Lost	Tie+W	Tie+L	NR	% Won	First win
Against Full Member
Bangladesh	4 December 2019	1	0	1	0	0	0	0.00	
India	23 July 2024	1	0	1	0	0	0	0.00	
Pakistan	21 July 2024	1	0	1	0	0	0	0.00	
Zimbabwe	24 January 2026	1	1	0	0	0	0	100.00	24 January 2026
Against Associate Member
Bahrain	20 June 2022	4	4	0	0	0	0	100.00	20 June 2022
Bhutan	23 November 2021	5	5	0	0	0	0	100.00	23 November 2021
China	12 January 2019	4	3	1	0	0	0	100.00	12 January 2019
Hong Kong	24 February 2019	11	5	6	0	0	0	50.00	24 February 2019
Indonesia	18 January 2019	2	2	0	0	0	0	100.00	18 January 2019
Italy	19 April 2026	2	2	0	0	0	0	100.00	19 April 2026
Japan	18 November 2023	2	2	0	0	0	0	100.00	18 November 2023
Kuwait	27 February 2019	5	5	0	0	0	0	100.00	27 February 2019
Malaysia	13 January 2019	19	12	7	0	0	0	62.50	13 January 2019
Maldives	2 December 2019	3	3	0	0	0	0	100.00	2 December 2019
Namibia	8 March 2025	2	0	2	0	0	0	0.00	
Netherlands	30 January 2025	4	0	4	0	0	0	0.00	
Qatar	16 November 2021	5	5	0	0	0	0	100.00	16 November 2021
Rwanda	22 April 2026	2	2	0	0	0	0	100.00	22 April 2026
Scotland	26 January 2026	1	0	1	0	0	0	0.00	
Tanzania	15 November 2023	1	0	1	0	0	0	0.00	
Thailand	19 January 2019	9	0	9	0	0	0	0.00	
Uganda	16 May 2022	7	3	4	0	0	0	42.85	20 May 2022
United Arab Emirates	14 January 2019	6	4	1	0	0	1	66.66	14 January 2019
Vanuatu	24 April 2026	2	1	1	0	0	0	50.00	30 April 2026
Source: ESPNcricinfo Last updated: 10 June 2026

==== First bilateral T20I series wins ====
Opponent	Year of first Home win	Year of first Away win
Qatar		2021
Malaysia		2023

=== Team scoring records ===
==== Highest innings totals ====
Rank	Score	Opposition	Venue	Date
1	227/4 (20 overs)	Maldives	UKM-YSD Cricket Oval, Bangi	13 February 2024
2	164/3 (20 overs)	Qatar	West End Park International Cricket Stadium, Doha	18 November 2021
3	146/4 (20 overs)	Qatar	West End Park International Cricket Stadium, Doha	16 November 2021
4	145/4 (20 overs)	Netherlands	Tribhuvan University International Cricket Ground, Kirtipur	5 February 2025
5	138/7 (20 overs)	Netherlands	Tribhuvan University International Cricket Ground, Kirtipur	22 January 2026
Source: ESPNcricinfo Last updated: 22 January 2026

==== Lowest innings totals ====
Rank	Score	Teams	Venue	Date
1	40 (13.3 Overs)	Hong Kong	Kolej Tuanku Ja'afar Cricket Oval, Mantin	6 June 2026
2	50 (19.2 Overs)	Bangladesh	Pokhara Rangasala, Pokhara	4 December 2019
3	50 (16.5 Overs)	Malaysia	UKM-YSD Cricket Oval, Bangi	29 May 2023
4	51 (17.2 Overs)	Thailand	Terdthai Cricket Ground, Bangkok	19 January 2019
5	51 (19.3 Overs)	Uganda	Entebbe Cricket Oval, Entebbe	13 March 2025
Note: Team successfully reaching the target scores and Low totals in reduced overs matches are excluded unless the team was all out. Source: ESPNcricinfo Last updated: 6 June 2026

==== Highest match aggregate ====
Score	Against	Venue	Date
296/4 (39.4 overs)	Netherlands	Tribhuvan University International Cricket Ground, Kirtipur	5 February 2025
294/11 (40 overs)	Netherlands	Tribhuvan University International Cricket Ground, Kirtipur	30 January 2025
278/12 (40 overs)	Netherlands	Tribhuvan University International Cricket Ground, Kirtipur	22 January 2026
274/12 (40 overs)	India	Rangiri Dambulla International Stadium, Dambulla	23 July 2024
265/17 (40 overs)	Netherlands	Tribhuvan University International Cricket Ground, Kirtipur	2 February 2025
Source: Cricinfo. Last updated: 22 January 2026

==== Lowest match aggregate ====
Score	Against	Venue	Date
17/10 (12.4 Overs)	Maldives	Pokhara Rangasala, Pokhara	7 December 2019
29/8 (10.4 Overs)	Bahrain	Kinrara Academy Oval, Kuala Lumpur	20 June 2022
33/10 (11.0 Overs)	Maldives	Pokhara Rangasala, Pokhara	2 December 2019
55/11 (19.1 Overs)	Kuwait	ICC Academy Ground, Dubai	25 November 2021
59/6 (9.3 Overs)	Hong Kong	Asian Institute of Technology Ground, Bangkok	13 May 2025
Source: Cricinfo. Last updated: 13 May 2025

==== Highest win margins (by wickets) ====
Rank	Margin	Target	Opponent	Venue	Date
1	10 Wickets	49	China	Asian Institute of Technology Ground, Bangkok	12 January 2019
1	10 Wickets	17	Maldives	Pokhara Rangasala, Pokhara	2 December 2019
1	10 Wickets	9	Maldives	Pokhara Rangasala, Pokhara	7 December 2019
1	10 Wickets	32	Bahrain	Kinrara Academy Oval, Kuala Lumpur	1 September 2023
5	9 Wickets	28	Kuwait	ICC Academy Ground, Dubai	25 November 2021
5	9 Wickets	75	Qatar	UKM-YSD Cricket Oval, Bangi	4 September 2023
5	9 Wickets	42	Bahrain	Terdthai Cricket Ground, Bangkok	10 May 2025
Source: ESPNcricinfo Last updated: 10 May 2025

==== Highest win margins (by runs) ====
Rank	Margin	Teams	Venue	Date
1	214 runs	Maldives	UKM-YSD Cricket Oval, Bangi	13 February 2024
2	119 runs	Qatar	West End Park International Cricket Stadium, Doha	16 November 2021
3	109 runs	Qatar	West End Park International Cricket Stadium, Doha	18 November 2021
4	92 runs	Indonesia	Terdthai Cricket Ground, Bangkok	18 January 2019
5	83 runs	Vanuatu	Gahanga International Cricket Stadium, Kigali	30 April 2026
Source: ESPNcricinfo Last updated: 30 April 2026

==== Highest win margin (by balls remaining) ====
Balls remaining	Target	Against	Venue	Date
115	17	Maldives	Pokhara Rangasala, Pokhara	2 December 2019
113	9	Maldives	Pokhara Rangasala, Pokhara	7 December 2019
103	32	Bahrain	Kinrara Academy Oval, Kuala Lumpur	1 September 2023
99	28	Kuwait	ICC Academy Ground, Dubai	25 November 2021
69	62	Bhutan	ICC Academy Ground No 2, Dubai	23 November 2021
Source: Cricinfo. Last updated: 25 November 2021

==== Lowest win margins (by runs) ====
Rank	Margin	Teams	Venue	Date
1	5 runs	China	Terdthai Cricket Ground, Bangkok	25 February 2019
1	5 runs	Malaysia	Bayuemas Oval, Kuala Lumpur	31 August 2023
3	13 runs	Hong Kong	Bayuemas Oval, Kuala Lumpur	26 August 2023
4	15 runs	Uganda	Tribhuvan University International Cricket Ground, Kirtipur	20 May 2022
5	19 runs	China	Bayuemas Oval, Pandamaran	27 May 2026
Source: ESPNcricinfo Last updated: 27 May 2026

==== Lowest win margin (by wickets) ====
Margin	Target	Against	Venue	Date
1 wicket	76	Uganda	Entebbe Cricket Oval, Entebbe	9 March 2025
2 wickets	89	Rwanda	Gahanga B Ground, Kigali	22 April 2026
2 wickets	68	Malaysia	Bayuemas Oval, Pandamaran	20 May 2026
3 wickets	110	Malaysia	UKM-YSD Cricket Oval, Bangi	4 June 2023
3 wickets	40	Bhutan	UKM-YSD Cricket Oval, Bangi	3 September 2023
Source: Cricinfo. Last updated: 22 April 2026

==== Lowest win margin (by balls remaining) ====
Margin	Target	Against	Venue	Date
1 ball	76	Uganda	Entebbe Cricket Oval, Entebbe	9 March 2025
2 balls	89	Rwanda	Gahanga B Ground, Kigali	22 April 2026
3 balls	105	Hong Kong	Entebbe Cricket Oval, Entebbe	14 March 2025
3 balls	115	United Arab Emirates	Terdthai Cricket Ground, Bangkok	19 May 2025
3 balls	130	Zimbabwe	Tribhuvan University International Cricket Ground, Kirtipur	24 January 2026
3 balls	114	Indonesia	Bayuemas Oval, Pandamaran	28 May 2026
Source: Cricinfo. Last updated: 28 May 2026

== Batting records ==
=== Most career runs ===
Rank	Runs	Player	Innings	Career span
1	1,322	Indu Barma	92	2019–2026
2	1,100	Rubina Chhetry	85	2019–2026
2	1,078	Sita Rana Magar	69	2019–2026
4	859	Puja Mahato	57	2023–2026
5	728	Samjhana Khadka	58	2023–2026
Source: ESPNcricinfo Last updated: 10 June 2026

=== Highest career average ===
Rank	Average	Player	Runs	Innings	Not out	Career span
1	20.73	Sita Rana Magar	1,078	69	17	2019–2026
2	19.09	Jyoti Pandey	210	12	1	2021–2023
3	18.64	Rubina Chhetry	1,017	85	26	2019–2026
4	18.61	Indu Barma	1,080	92	21	2019–2026
5	17.18	Puja Mahato	613	57	7	2023–2026
Source: ESPNcricinfo Last updated: 10 June 2026, Qualification: 10 innings

=== Highest career strike rate ===
Rank	Strike rate	Player	Innings	Runs	Balls faced	Career span
1	100.83	Samjhana Khadka	58	728	722	2023–2026
2	92.35	Rubina Chhetry	73	1,100	1,191	2019–2026
3	86.17	Indu Barma	75	1,322	1,534	2019–2026
4	83.33	Jyoti Pandey	12	210	252	2021–2023
5	81.88	Puja Mahato	39	859	1,049	2023–2026
Source: ESPNcricinfo Last updated: 10 June 2026, Qualification: 250 balls faced

=== Highest individual score ===
Rank	Runs	Player	Opposition	Venue	Date
1	118*	Rubina Chhetry	Maldives	UKM-YSD Cricket Oval, Bangi	13 February 2024
2	82*	Sita Rana Magar	Qatar	West End Park International Cricket Stadium, Doha	18 November 2021
3	72*	Samjhana Khadka	United Arab Emirates	Rangiri Dambulla International Stadium, Dambulla	19 July 2024
4	63	Puja Mahato	China	Bayuemas Oval, Pandamaran	27 May 2026
5	62*	Puja Mahato	Netherlands	Tribhuvan University International Cricket Ground, Kirtipur	5 February 2025
Source: ESPNcricinfo Last updated: 27 May 2026

=== Most fifties and over ===
Rank	50+ scores			Batsman	Innings	T20I career span
Rank	Fifty	Century	Total	Batsman	Innings	T20I career span
1	4	0	4	Puja Mahato	57	2023–2026
2	2	0	2	Samjhana Khadka	58	2023–2026
2	1	1	2	Rubina Chhetry	73	2019–2026
4	1	0	1	Rubi Poddar	22	2023–2026
4	1	0	1	Sita Rana Magar	69	2019–2026
4	1	0	1	Indu Barma	92	2019–2026
Source: Cricinfo Last updated: 10 June 2026

=== Most Centuries ===
100s	Batsman	Innings	T20I career span
1	Rubina Chhetry	85	2019–2026
Source: Cricinfo. Last updated: 13 February 2024

=== Most career sixes ===
Rank	Sixes	Player	Career span
1	16	Rubina Chhetry	2019–2026
2	9	Kabita Joshi	2021–2026
3	8	Sita Rana Magar	2019–2026
4	7	Puja Mahato	2023–2026
5	4	Dolly Bhatta	2019–2024
5	4	Kabita Kunwar	2019–2026
5	4	Indu Barma	2019–2026
Source: ESPNcricinfo Last updated: 10 June 2026

=== Most career Fours ===
Rank	Fours	Player	Career span
1	113	Indu Barma	2019–2026
2	112	Rubina Chhetry	2019–2026
3	97	Sita Rana Magar	2019–2026
4	93	Samjhana Khadka	2023–2026
5	70	Puja Mahato	2023–2026
Source: ESPNcricinfo Last updated: 10 June 2026

=== Highest strike rate in an innings ===
Rank	Strike rate	Player	Runs	Balls	Opposition	Venue	Date
1	238.88	Indu Barma	43*	18	Vanuatu	Gahanga International Cricket Stadium, Kigali	30 April 2026
2	236.36	Samjhana Khadka	26	11	Thailand	Tribhuvan University International Cricket Ground, Kirtipur	18 January 2026
3	225.00	Sita Rana Magar	27*	12	Netherlands	Tribhuvan University International Cricket Ground, Kirtipur	22 January 2026
4	220.00	Kabita Kunwar	33	15	Malaysia	Bayuemas Oval, Pandamaran	30 May 2026
5	200.00	Rubina Chhetry	118*	59	Maldives	UKM-YSD Cricket Oval, Bangi	13 February 2024
Source: ESPNcricinfo Last updated: 30 May 2026; Qualification: 25 runs

=== Most Ducks ===
Rank	Ducks	Player	Innings	Period
1	11	Rubina Chhetry	85	2019–2026
2	9	Kabita Kunwar	58	2019–2026
2	9	Indu Barma	92	2019–2026
4	8	Bindu Rawal	45	2019–2026
4	8	Samjhana Khadka	58	2023–2026
Source: ESPNcricinfo Last updated: 10 June 2026

=== Most Runs in a Series ===
Rank	Runs	Player	Innings	Average	Highest Score	Opponent
1	161	Samjhana Khadka	8	23.00	52	2026 Women's Challenge Trophy
2	155	Rubina Chhetry	4	155.00	118*	2024 ACC Women's Premier Cup
3	138	Sita Rana Magar	5	34.50	48	2019 Thailand Women's T20 Smash
4	134	Puja Mahato	6	26.80	62*	2025 Nepal Women's Tri-Nation Series
5	121	Sita Rana Magar	2	121.00	82*	Nepal women's cricket team in Qatar in 2021–22
Source: Cricinfo. Last updated: 1 May 2026

== Bowling records ==
=== Most career wickets ===
Rank	Wickets	Bowler	Innings	T20 Career Span
1	79	Kabita Kunwar	82	2019–2026
2	67	Rubina Chhetry	83	2019–2026
3	66	Sita Rana Magar	71	2019–2026
4	42	Puja Mahato	58	2023–2026
5	41	Indu Barma	47	2019–2026
Source: Cricinfo. Last updated: 10 June 2026

=== Best career averages ===
Rank	Average	Bowler	Innings	Wickets	Runs conceded	T20 Career Span
1	11.97	Manisha Upadhayay	26	36	431	2025–2026
2	12.00	Karuna Bhandari	20	17	204	2019–2021
3	12.55	Asmina Karmacharya	20	18	226	2022–2024
4	12.93	Kabita Kunwar	82	79	1,022	2019–2026
5	15.51	Indu Barma	47	41	636	2019–2026
Source: Cricinfo. Last updated: 10 June 2026; Qualification: 250 balls bowled

=== Best economy rates ===
Rank	Economy Rate	Bowler	Innings	Overs bowled	Runs conceded	T20 Career Span
1	3.51	Karuna Bhandari	20	58.0	204	2019–2021
2	4.12	Kabita Kunwar	82	247.3	1,022	2019–2026
3	4.37	Rubina Chhetry	83	247.3	1,084	2019–2026
4	4.60	Indu Barma	47	138.1	636	2019–2026
5	4.62	Asmina Karmacharya	20	48.5	226	2022–2024
Source: Cricinfo. Last updated: 10 June 2026; Qualification: 250 balls bowled

=== Hat-tricks ===
No.	Bowler	Against	Dismissals	Venue	Date	Ref.
1	Rubina Chhetry	Kuwait	• Khadija Khalil (b) • Madeeha Zuberi (b) • Zeefa Jilani (b)	Bangkok	27 February 2019	

=== Best figures in an innings ===
Rank	Bowling	Player	Opponent	Venue	Date
1	6/0	Anjali Chand	Maldives	Pokhara Rangasala, Pokhara	2 December 2019
2	6/5	Kabita Kunwar	Vanuatu	Gahanga International Cricket Stadium, Kigali	30 April 2026
3	6/8	Nary Thapa	Hong Kong	Asian Institute of Technology Ground, Bangkok	24 February 2019
4	5/6	Sangita Rai	Japan	Hong Kong Cricket Club, Wong Nai Chung Gap	18 November 2023
5	5/10	Asmina Karmacharya	United Arab Emirates	Kinrara Academy Oval, Kuala Lumpur	24 June 2022
Source: ESPNcricinfo Last updated: 30 April 2026

=== Most Four (and over) wickets in an innings ===
No.	Player	Innings	Wickets	Period
2	Anjali Chand	3	10	2019–2019
2	Nary Thapa	11	17	2019–2019
2	Sangita Rai	15	20	2021–2024
2	Asmina Karmacharya	20	18	2022–2024
2	Manisha Upadhayay	26	36	2025–2026
2	Sita Rana Magar	71	66	2019–2026
2	Rubina Chhetry	83	67	2019–2026
Source: Cricinfo. Last updated: 10 June 2026

=== Most Five wickets in an innings ===
No.	Player	Innings	Period
2	Sita Rana Magar	71	2019–2026
1	Anjali Chand	3	2019–2019
1	Nary Thapa	11	2019–2019
1	Sangita Rai	15	2021–2023
1	Asmina Karmacharya	20	2022–2024
1	Kabita Kunwar	82	2019–2026
Source: Cricinfo. Last updated: 10 June 2026

=== Most runs conceded in an innings ===
Rank	Runs	Player	Overs	Opponent	Venue	Date
1	41	Sabnam Rai	4.0	India	Rangiri Dambulla International Stadium, Dambulla	23 July 2024
1	41	Riya Sharma	4.0	Scotland	Tribhuvan University International Cricket Ground, Kirtipur	26 January 2026
3	40	Ishwori Bist	4.0	Namibia	Entebbe Cricket Oval, Entebbe	12 March 2025
4	36	Kabita Joshi	4.0	India	Rangiri Dambulla International Stadium, Dambulla	23 July 2024
4	36	Somu Bist	4.0	Netherlands	Tribhuvan University International Cricket Ground, Kirtipur	22 January 2026
Source: Cricinfo. Last updated: 26 January 2026

=== Most wickets in a series ===
Wickets	Player	Innings	Series
15	Kabita Kunwar	8	2026 Women's Challenge Trophy
13	Nary Thapa	6	2019 Women's World Twenty20 Asia Qualifier
12	Manisha Upadhayay	8	2026 Women's Challenge Trophy
10	Anjali Chand	3	2019 South Asian Games
9	Kabita Kunwar	4	Nepal in Malaysia in 2025–26
9	Rachana Chaudhary	6	2026 Women's Challenge Trophy
Source: Cricinfo. Last updated: 1 May 2026

== Fielding records ==
Does not include catches taken by wicketkeeper.

=== Most catches in career ===
Catches	Player	Innings	Period
40	Rubina Chhetry	100	2019–2026
36	Indu Barma	100	2019–2026
20	Kabita Kunwar	83	2019–2026
18	Sita Rana Magar	77	2019–2026
15	Kabita Joshi	67	2021–2026
Source: Cricinfo. Last updated: 10 June 2026

=== Most catches in a series ===
Catches	Player	Matches	Series
7	Rubina Chhetry	7	2026 Women's Challenge Trophy
6	Indu Barma	6	2025 Women's Day Cup
4	Rubina Chhetry	6	2019 Women's World Twenty20 Asia Qualifier
4	Rubina Chhetry	6	2025 Nepal Women's Tri-Nation Series
4	Samjhana Khadka	6	2025 Women's Day Cup
Source: Cricinfo. Last updated: 1 May 2026

== Wicketkeeping records ==
=== Most dismissals in career ===
Rank	Dismissals	Player	Innings	Catches	Stumpings	Period
1	28	Kajal Shrestha	45	13	15	2019–2026
2	12	Rubi Poddar	27	5	7	2023–2026
3	5	Alisha Yadav	8	4	1	2025–2025
3	5	Jyoti Pandey	13	3	2	2021–2023
5	4	Roma Thapa	8	2	2	2019–2026
Note: Innings refers to the number of innings as a designated wicket keeper. Source: ESPNcricinfo Last updated: 10 June 2026

=== Most dismissals in an innings ===
Dismissals	Wicket-Keeper	Catches	Stumpings	Opposition	Venue	Date
3	Kajal Shrestha	3	0	Hong Kong	Selangor Turf Club, Kuala Lumpur	10 February 2024
2	Kajal Shrestha	0	2	Hong Kong	Asian Institute of Technology Ground, Bangkok	24 February 2019
2	Kajal Shrestha	0	2	Kuwait	Asian Institute of Technology Ground, Bangkok	27 February 2019
2	Jyoti Pandey	1	1	Uganda	Tribhuvan University International Cricket Ground, Kirtipur	19 May 2022
2	Jyoti Pandey	1	1	United Arab Emirates	Kinrara Academy Oval, Kuala Lumpur	24 June 2022
2	Kajal Shrestha	0	2	Hong Kong	Bayuemas Oval, Kuala Lumpur	22 August 2023
2	Kajal Shrestha	2	0	Hong Kong	Bayuemas Oval, Kuala Lumpur	26 August 2023
2	Alisha Yadav	1	1	Netherlands	Tribhuvan University International Cricket Ground, Kirtipur	2 February 2025
2	Rubi Poddar	1	1	Malaysia	Bayuemas Oval, Pandamaran	5 October 2025
2	Roma Thapa	0	2	Italy	Gahanga B Ground, Kigali	19 April 2026
2	Rubi Poddar	0	2	Vanuatu	Gahanga International Cricket Stadium, Kigali	24 April 2026
2	Rubi Poddar	1	1	China	Bayuemas Oval, Pandamaran	27 May 2026
Source: Cricinfo. Last updated: 27 May 2026

=== Most dismissals in a series ===
Dismissals	Wicket-Keeper	Innings	Catches	Stumpings	Opposition
8	Kajal Shrestha	6	2	6	2019 ICC Women's Qualifier Asia
6	Kajal Shrestha	5	4	2	2024 ACC Women's Premier Cup
4	Rubi Poddar	4	2	2	2026 Asian Games Qualifier
4	Kajal Shrestha	4	2	2	2023 Malaysia Women's Quadrangular Series
4	Alisha Yadav	5	3	1	2025 Nepal Women's Tri-Nation Series
4	Rubi Poddar	6	0	4	2026 Women's Challenge Trophy
Source: Cricinfo. Last updated: 31 May 2026

== Other records ==
=== Most matches played in career ===
Matches	Player	Career span
100	Rubina Chhetry	2019–2026
100	Indu Barma	2019–2026
83	Kabita Kunwar	2019–2026
77	Sita Rana Magar	2019–2026
67	Kabita Joshi	2021–2026
Source: Cricinfo. Last updated: 10 June 2026

=== Most Matches played as Captain ===
Matches	Player	Won	Lost	Tied	NR	Result %	Career span
56	Indu Barma	27	29	0	0	48.21	2023–2026
46	Rubina Chhetry	32	13	0	1	71.11	2019–2023
Source: Cricinfo. Last updated: 10 June 2026

=== Most matches won as captain ===
Won	Player	Period
32	Rubina Chhetry	2019–2023
27	Indu Barma	2023–2026
Source: Cricinfo. Last updated: 10 June 2026

== Partnership Records ==
=== Highest partnerships (by runs) ===
Rank	Runs	Wicket	Players	Opponent	Venue	Date
1	166*	5th	Puja Mahato & Rubina Chhetry	Maldives	UKM-YSD Cricket Oval, Bangi	13 February 2024
2	88	2nd	Sita Rana Magar & Indu Barma	Qatar	West End Park International Cricket Stadium, Doha	16 November 2021
3	81	3rd	Sita Rana Magar & Indu Barma	Hong Kong	ICC Academy Ground, Dubai	22 November 2021
4	78	3rd	Indu Barma & Puja Mahato	Netherlands	Tribhuvan University International Cricket Ground, Kirtipur	5 February 2025
5	76	2nd	Sita Rana Magar & Indu Barma	Hong Kong	Selangor Turf Club, Kuala Lumpur	10 February 2024
Source: ESPNcricinfo Last updated: 5 February 2025

- Note: An asterisk (*) signifies an unbroken partnership (i.e. neither of the batsmen were dismissed before either the end of the allotted overs or they reached the required score).

=== Highest partnerships (by wicket) ===
Partnership	Runs	Players	Opponent	Venue	Date
1st wicket	61	Kajal Shrestha & Sita Rana Magar	United Arab Emirates	Asian Institute of Technology Ground, Bangkok	14 January 2019
2nd wicket	88	Sita Rana Magar & Indu Barma	Qatar	West End Park International Cricket Stadium, Doha	16 November 2021
3rd wicket	81	Sita Rana Magar & Indu Barma	Hong Kong	ICC Academy Ground No 2, Dubai	22 November 2021
4th wicket	64	Puja Mahato & Rubi Poddar	China	Bayuemas Oval, Pandamaran	27 May 2026
5th wicket	166*	Puja Mahato & Rubina Chhetry	Maldives	UKM-YSD Cricket Oval, Bangi	13 February 2024
6th wicket	51	Sita Rana Magar & Apsari Begam	Malaysia	Bayuemas Oval, Pandamaran	31 August 2023
6th wicket	51	Indu Barma & Kabita Kunwar	Malaysia	Bayuemas Oval, Pandamaran	30 May 2026
7th wicket	44*	Rubina Chhetry & Apsari Begam	Hong Kong	Kinrara Academy Oval, Kuala Lumpur	21 June 2022
8th wicket	45*	Rubina Chhetry & Sita Rana Magar	Netherlands	Tribhuvan University International Cricket Ground, Kirtipur	22 January 2026
9th wicket	32	Sita Rana Magar & Suman Bist	Tanzania	Hong Kong Cricket Club, Wong Nai Chung Gap	15 November 2023
10th wicket	9	Sangita Rai & Sabnam Rai	United Arab Emirates	ICC Academy Ground No 2, Dubai	28 November 2021
10th wicket	9	Kabita Kunwar & Khusi Dangol	Thailand	UKM-YSD Cricket Oval, Bangi	8 September 2023
Source: ESPNcricinfo Last updated: 30 May 2026

- Note: An asterisk (*) signifies an unbroken partnership (i.e. neither of the batsmen were dismissed before either the end of the allotted overs or they reached the required score).

== See also ==
- Nepal national cricket team
- List of Nepal Twenty20 International cricketers
- List of Twenty20 International records
- List of Nepal One Day International records
- List of Nepal Twenty20 International cricket records
- Cricket Association of Nepal
