= 2024–25 Prime Minister Cup (women) =

Cricket tournament in Nepal

2024–25 Prime Minister Cup (Women)
- Dates: 14 – 25 January 2025
- Administrator: Cricket Association of Nepal
- Cricket format: Twenty20
- Tournament format(s): Round-robin and Playoffs
- Host: Nepal
- Champions: APF Club (7th title)
- Runners-up: Sudurpashchim Province
- Participants: 9
- Matches: 22
- Player of the series: Indu Barma (APF Club)
- Most runs: Mamta Chaudhary (Sudurpashchim Province) (209)
- Most wickets: Manisha Upadhayay (Bagmati Province) (10)

The 2024–25 Prime Minister Cup (Women) was the tenth edition of the Prime Minister Cup Women's National Cricket Tournament, the premier Twenty20 cricket tournament in Nepal. The tournament was contested by teams representing the seven provinces of Nepal as well as two departmental teams. It began on 14 January and end on 25 January 2025. Tribhuwan Army Club made their debut in the tournament. Nine teams were divided into two groups with the top two advancing to the Super Four. All the matches were played at Fapla International Cricket Ground in Dhangadhi.

APF Club were the defending champion having won the previous season.

APF Club won their seventh title, beating Sudurpashchim Province in the final.

== Squads ==
Nine team are divided into two groups, Group A consist of five team and Group B with four team.

=== Group A ===
APF Club	Gandaki Province	Lumbini Province	Karnali Province	Sudurpashchim Province
Indu Barma (c); Rajmati Airee; Karuna Bhandari; Nisha Bhatt; Suman Bist; Binu Budha; Mamta Chaudhary; Kabita Joshi; Sanju Lama; Sarita Magar; Nagita Pun; Sabnam Rai; Rekha Rawal (wk); Roma Thapa	Srijana Poudel (c); Chandramaya Baral; Yasodha Vhujel; Apekshya Budhathoki; Dhan Chhetri; Niru GT; Jenisha Khatri; Manika Lamichhane; Salina Sen; Shreya Shah; Shreya Sharma; Rekha Tamang; Riya Tamang; Aakriti Tiwari	Saraswati GM (c); Sushmita Bajgai; Shruti Budhathoki; Anita Chaudhary; Ashna Chaudhary; Madhu DC; Kabita Khadka; Anjee Pathak; Bimala Pun; Samjhana Pun; Saraswati Pun; Manisha Rana; Ranju Shrestha; Saru Tiwari	Bina Thapa (c); Simran Bista; Sarita Bista; Gauri Bohara; Rama Budhathoki; Bimala Budhathoki; Shurati Buda; Sabina Chaudhary; Anju Gurung; Rakshi Khadka; Simana Malla; Dikshya Puri; Sobika Shahi; Anjila Thapa	Bindu Rawal (c); Manju Bista; Manisha Bohara; Rabina Dhami; Rewati Dhami; Ritu Kanoujiya; Manisha Khatri; Chetana Kunwar; Kabita Kunwar; Ashika Mahara; Shova Rokaya; Rabina Saud; Janki Thapa; Karishma Thapa

=== Group B ===
Bagmati Province	Koshi Province	Madhesh Province	Tribhuwan Army Club
Kanchan Shrestha (c, wk); Yashoda Bist; Saniya Giri; Helisha Gurung; Sonu Khadka; Yashu Pandey; Sanskriti Phuyal; Pooja Saud; Bipisha Shahi; Salina Silwal; Himanu Tamang; Manisha Upadhyaya; Aeli Yadav; Sabika Yadav	Rubina Chhetry (c); Apsari Begam; Jyoti Danwar; Bhawani Kamat; Smriti Katuwal; Alisha Khadiya; Prinsha Rana Magar; Bimala Malaha; Sangita Rai; Lakita Rajbanshi; Sanu Rajbanshi; Jyoti Shah; Tika Shah; Kajal Shrestha (wk)	Saraswati Chaudhary (c); Pragya Chhetri; Roji Kadari; Chandani Khatun; Seema Kunwar; Deepa Ram; Bandana Rajak; Monika Sah; Pratima Sah; Siwani Sah; Bhumi Singh; Shreya Thapa; Anu Yadav; Sakshi Yadav	Laxmi Saud (c); Pinky Bohara; Pinky Bohara; Ishwari Bist; Anjali Bishwokarma; Sushmita Bhusal; Manisha Chaudhary; Sangita Gurung; Samjhana Khadka; Rubi Podar (wk); Ashma Pulami Magar; Radhika Pujara; Sita Shahi; Yamuna Tharu; Ngima Tamang

== Venue ==
Nepal
Dhangadhi
2024–25 Prime Minister Cup (Women)
Fapla International Cricket Stadium
Capacity : 40,000

== Group stage ==
=== Group A ===
==== Points table ====
Pos	Team	Pld	W	L	NR	Pts	NRR	Qualification
1	APF Club	4	3	0	1	7	4.054	Advanced to Super 4
2	Sudurpashchim Province	4	3	1	0	6	1.131	Advanced to Super 4
3	Lumbini Province	4	2	1	1	5	0.249	
4	Gandaki Province	4	0	3	1	1	−1.868	
5	Karnali Province	4	0	3	1	1	−4.683	

Source: ESPNcricinfo

==== Fixtures ====
14 January 2025
09:00
Scorecard

Gandaki Province; 55/7 (15 overs)	v	Sudurpashchim Province; 56/3 (9.5 overs)
Salina Sen 13 (20); Rewati Dhami 4/9 (3 overs)		Rewati Dhami 21* (27); Apkshya Budhathoki 1/6 (2 overs)

Sudurpashchim Province won by 7 wickets
Fapla International Cricket Ground, Dhangadhi
Umpires: Ram Pandey and Niraj Singh
Player of the match: Rewati Dhami (Sudurpashchim Province)

- Sudurpashchim Province won the toss and elected to field.
- The match was reduced to 15 overs per side due to bad weather.

14 January 2025
13:00
Scorecard

APF Club; 182/1 (20 overs)	v	Karnali Province; 71/7 (20 overs)
Mamta Chaudhary 78* (66); Dikshya Puri 1/26 (4 overs)		Dikshya Puri 17 (20); Karuna Bhandari 3/11 (4 overs)

APF Club won by 111 runs
Fapla International Cricket Ground, Dhangadhi
Umpires: Inamuddin Halwai and Jaydev Joshi
Player of the match: Mamta Chaudhary (APF Club)

- APF Club won the toss and elected to bat.

15 January 2025
09:00
Scorecard

Gandaki Province; 70/5 (15 overs)	v	APF Club; 71/2 (9.3 overs)
Srijana Poudel 25 (34); Binu Budha 2/6 (3 overs)		Indu Barma 26* (21); Yashoda Bhujel 1/14 (2 overs)

APF Club won by 8 wickets
Fapla International Cricket Ground, Dhangadhi
Umpires: Kailash Mahar and Ram Pandey
Player of the match: Binu Budha (APF Club)

- APF Club won the toss and elected to field.
- The match was reduced to 15 overs per side due to bad weather.

15 January 2025
13:00
Scorecard

Sudurpashchim Province; 127/6 (20 overs)	v	Lumbini Province; 52 (19.1 overs)
Kabita Kunwar 55 (33); Saraswati Pun 3/14 (4 overs)		Saraswati Pun 14 (33); Rewati Dhami 3/7 (4 overs)

Sudurpashchim Province won by 75 runs
Fapla International Cricket Ground, Dhangadhi
Umpires: Inamuddin Halwai and Hem Joshi
Player of the match: Kabita Kunwar (Sudurpashchim Province)

- Sudurpashchim Province won the toss and elected to bat.

16 January 2025
09:00
Scorecard

Gandaki Province	v	Karnali Province

No result
Fapla International Cricket Ground, Dhangadhi
Umpires: Inamuddin Halwai and Hem Joshi

- Gandaki Province won the toss and elected to bat.
- No play was possible due to rain.

16 January 2025
13:00
Scorecard

APF Club	v	Lumbini Province

Match abandoned
Fapla International Cricket Ground, Dhangadhi
Umpires: Ram Pandey and Niraj Singh

- No toss.
- No play was possible due to rain.

17 January 2025
09:00
Scorecard

Karnali Province; 20/7 (5 overs)	v	Sudurpashchim Province; 21/0 (1.3 overs)
Shruti Budha 14* (6); Aashika Mahara 3/12 (2 overs)		Kabita Kunwar 14* (6)

Sudurpashchim Province won by 10 wickets
Fapla International Cricket Ground, Dhangadhi
Umpires: Inamuddin Halwai and Niraj Singh
Player of the match: Aashika Mahara (Sudurpashchim Province)

- Sudurpashchim Province won the toss and elected to field.
- The match was reduced to 5 overs per side due to wet outfield.

17 January 2025
13:00
Scorecard

Gandaki Province; 97/4 (20 overs)	v	Lumbini Province; 98/4 (16.2 overs)
Salina Sen 33* (52); Maneesha Rana 2/12 (4 overs)		Saraswati Pun 31* (26); Apkshya Budhathoki 2/11 (3 overs)

Lumbini Province won by 6 wickets
Fapla International Cricket Ground, Dhangadhi
Umpires: Ram Pandey and Ganesh Rajak
Player of the match: Saraswati Pun (Lumbini Province)

- Gandaki Province won the toss and elected to bat.

18 January 2025
09:00
Scorecard

APF Club; 126/2 (18 overs)	v	Sudurpashchim Province; 67/6 (18 overs)
Indu Barma 58* (45); Janaki Thapa 1/16 (2 overs)		Kabita Kunwar 29 (34); Indu Barma 2/6 (3 overs)

APF Club won by 59 runs
Fapla International Cricket Ground, Dhangadhi
Umpires: Ram Pandey and Niraj Singh
Player of the match: Indu Barma (APF Club)

- Sudurpashchim Province won the toss and elected to field.
- The match was reduced to 18 overs per side due to bad weather.

18 January 2025
13:00
Scorecard

Lumbini Province; 126/8 (20 overs)	v	Karnali Province; 55 (13 overs)
Ranju Shrestha 51* (59); Anju Gurung 3/25 (4 overs)		Rama Budhathoki 20 (31); Saraswati Pun 4/11 (4 overs)

Lumbini Province won by 71 runs
Fapla International Cricket Ground, Dhangadhi
Umpires: Hem Joshi and Kailash Mahar
Player of the match: Saraswati Pun (Lumbini Province)

- Lumbini Province won the toss and elected to bat.

=== Group B ===
==== Points table ====
Pos	Team	Pld	W	L	NR	Pts	NRR	Qualification
1	Tribhuwan Army Club	3	2	1	0	4	2.247	Advanced to Super 4
2	Bagmati Province	3	2	1	0	4	1.593	Advanced to Super 4
3	Koshi Province	3	2	1	0	4	1.261	Advanced to the play-off
4	Madhesh Province	3	0	3	0	0	−4.001	Advanced to the play-off

Source: ESPNcricinfo

==== Fixtures ====
19 January 2025
09:00
Scorecard

Koshi Province; 63/7 (13 overs)	v	Bagmati Province; 53 (12.1 overs)
Bimala Malaha 19* (23); Manisha Upadhayay 4/7 (3 overs)		Sabika Yadav 20 (32); Sangita Rai 2/6 (3 overs)

Koshi Province won by 10 runs
Fapla International Cricket Ground, Dhangadhi
Umpires: Jaydev Joshi and Ram Pandey
Player of the match: Rubina Chhetry (Koshi Province)

- Bagmati Province won the toss and elected to field.
- The match was reduced to 13 overs per side due to wet outfield.

19 January 2025
13:00
Scorecard

Madhesh Province; 25 (15.2 overs)	v	Tribhuwan Army Club; 29/0 (2.5 overs)
Bhumi Singh 10 (21); Ashma Pulami Magar 3/4 (1.2 overs)		Samjhana Khadka 22* (10)

Tribhuwan Army Club won by 10 wickets
Fapla International Cricket Ground, Dhangadhi
Umpires: Inamuddin Halwai and Ganesh Rajak
Player of the match: Ashma Pulami Magar (Tribhuwan Army Club)

- Madhesh Province won the toss and elected to field.

20 January 2025
09:00
Scorecard

Bagmati Province; 81/2 (15 overs)	v	Tribhuwan Army Club; 67 (13.2 overs)
Yashu Pandey 25 (32); Ishwori Bist 1/12 (3 overs)		Anjali Bishowkarma 14 (16); Kanchan Shrestha 2/8 (2 overs)

Bagmati Province won by 14 runs
Fapla International Cricket Ground, Dhangadhi
Umpires: Ram Pandey and Niraj Singh
Player of the match: Kanchan Shrestha (Bagmati Province)

- Tribhuwan Army Club won the toss and elected to field.
- The match was reduced to 15 overs per side due to bad weather.

20 January 2025
13:00
Scorecard

Koshi Province; 106/5 (20 overs)	v	Madhesh Province; 59/9 (20 overs)
Rubina Chhetry 57 (53); Pratima Sah 2/21 (4 overs)		Pratima Sah 17 (31); Rubina Chhetry 3/10 (4 overs)

Koshi Province won by 47 runs
Fapla International Cricket Ground, Dhangadhi
Umpires: Inamuddin Halwai and Kailash Mahar
Player of the match: Rubina Chhetry (Koshi Province)

- Koshi Province won the toss and elected to bat.

21 January 2025
09:00
Scorecard

Koshi Province; 36/5 (7 overs)	v	Tribhuwan Army Club
Smirti Katuwal 14 (13); Manisha Chaudhary 3/7 (2 overs)		Samjhana Khadka 32* (23)

Tribhuwan Army Club won by 9 wickets
Fapla International Cricket Ground, Dhangadhi
Umpires: Hem Joshi and Ram Pandey
Player of the match: Manisha Chaudhary (Tribhuwan Army Club)

- Tribhuwan Army Club won the toss and elected to field.
- The match was reduced to 7 overs per side due to bad weather.

21 January 2025
13:00
Scorecard

Madhesh Province; 40 (15.5 overs)	v	Bagmati Province; 44/3 (6.4 overs)
Sakshi Yadav 6 (14); Saraswati Kumari 6 (14); Kanchan Shrestha 4/12 (4 overs)		Yashu Pandey 19 (19); Roji Kadari 2/0 (1 over)

Bagmati Province won by 7 wickets
Fapla International Cricket Ground, Dhangadhi
Umpires: Inamuddin Halwai and Jaydev Joshi
Player of the match: Kanchan Shrestha (Bagmati Province)

- Bagmati Province won the toss and elected to field.

== Playoff ==
22 January 2025
11:00
Scorecard

Koshi Province	v	Madhesh Province

Match abandoned
Fapla International Cricket Ground, Dhangadhi
Umpires: Inamuddin Halwai and Niraj Singh

- No toss.
- No play was possible due to bad weather.

== Super 4 ==
=== Points table ===
Pos	Team	Pld	W	L	NR	Pts	NRR	Qualification
1	APF Club	3	3	0	0	6	3.888	Advance to the final
2	Sudurpashchim Province	3	1	2	0	2	−0.741	Advance to the final
3	Tribhuwan Army Club	3	1	2	0	2	−1.327	
4	Bagmati Province	3	1	2	0	2	−1.463	

Source: ESPNcricinfo

=== Fixtures ===
23 January 2025
09:00
Scorecard

Bagmati Province; 42/8 (18 overs)	v	APF Club; 44/0 (6.5 overs)
Aeli Yadav 8 (18); Suman Bist 3/6 (3 overs)		Mamta Chaudhary 23* (20)

APF Club won by 10 wickets
Fapla International Cricket Ground, Dhangadhi
Umpires: Inamuddin Halwai and Hem Joshi
Player of the match: Suman Bist (APF Club)

- APF Club won the toss and elected to field.
- The match was reduced to 18 overs per side due to bad weather.

23 January 2025
13:00
Scorecard

Tribhuwan Army Club; 110/6 (20 overs)	v	Sudurpashchim Province; 96/6 (20 overs)
Samjhana Khadka 74* (57); Janaki Thapa 2/21 (3 overs)		Manisha Bohara 18 (37); Sushmita Bhusal 3/21 (4 overs)

Tribhuwan Army Club won by 14 runs
Fapla International Cricket Ground, Dhangadhi
Umpires: Ram Pandey and Niraj Singh
Player of the match: Samjhana Khadka (Tribhuwan Army Club)

- Sudurpashchim Province won the toss and elected to field.

24 January 2025
09:00
Scorecard

APF Club; 115/3 (17 overs)	v	Tribhuwan Army Club; 46 (17 overs)
Rajmati Airee 35 (35); Sushmita Bhusal 2/29 (4 overs)		Radhika Pujara 17 (27); Rekha Rawal 4/11 (4 overs)

APF Club won by 69 runs
Fapla International Cricket Ground, Dhangadhi
Umpires: Hem Joshi and Ram Pandey
Player of the match: Rekha Rawal (APF Club)

- Tribhuwan Army Club won the toss and elected to field.
- The match was reduced to 17 overs per side due to bad weather.

24 January 2025
13:00
Scorecard

Sudurpashchim Province; 112/7 (20 overs)	v	Bagmati Province; 82 (19.4 overs)
Ritu Kanoujiya 34* (44); Manisha Upadhayay 3/12 (4 overs)		Yashoda Bist 30 (38); Karishma Thapa 2/13 (3.4 overs)

Sudurpashchim Province won by 30 runs
Fapla International Cricket Ground, Dhangadhi
Umpires: Inamuddin Halwai and Kailash Mahar
Player of the match: Ritu Kanoujiya (Sudurpashchim Province)

- Sudurpashchim Province won the toss and elected to bat.

== Final ==
25 January 2025
11:30
Scorecard

Sudurpashchim Province; 67 (18.1 overs)	v	Nepal APF Club; 69/1 (12.5 overs)
Manisha Bohara 18 (23); Kabita Joshi 3/18 (4 overs)		Mamta Chaudhary 43* (43)

APF Club won by 9 wickets
Fapla International Cricket Ground, Dhangadhi
Umpires: Inamuddin Halwai and Ram Pandey
Player of the match: Kabita Joshi (APF Club)

- Sudurpashchim Province won the toss and elected to bat.

== See also ==
- Women's Elite Trophy
