= 2026 Women's Challenge Trophy =

International cricket tournament

- Official logo of ICC Women's Challenge Trophy
- Dates: 18 April – 1 May 2026
- Administrator: International Cricket Council
- Cricket format: Twenty20 International
- Tournament format: Double round-robin
- Host: Rwanda
- Champions: United States (1st title)
- Runners-up: Nepal
- Participants: 5
- Matches: 20
- Most runs: (United States) Chetna Pagydyala (261)
- Most wickets: (Nepal) Kabita Kunwar (15) (Vanuatu) Vanessa Vira (15)

The 2026 ICC Women's Challenge Trophy, the inaugural edition of the Women's Challenge Trophy, was a Twenty20 International (T20I) cricket tournament took place from 18 April to 1 May 2026 in Kigali, Rwanda. The competition was part of the International Cricket Council's (ICC) strategy to promote women's cricket and expand worldwide participation. The Challenge Trophy was part of a three-tier system for associate members of the ICC and sits below the Women's Emerging Nations Trophy, which held its first edition in November 2025.

The tournament was contested by one team from each of the ICC's five regions, specifically the sides that finished highest in regional qualification for the 2026 Women's T20 World Cup and who did not feature in the 2025 Women's Emerging Nations Trophy. The qualified teams were Italy (Europe), Nepal (Asia), Rwanda (Africa), United States (Americas) and Vanuatu (East Asia-Pacific). Italy competed in an ICC event outside of Europe for the first time.

United States won the inaugural edition by finishing top of the table with 6 wins from 8 matches and 1 no result, earning 13 points, while Nepal came in as runners-up after winning 5 of their 8 matches and finishing with 10 points.

== Squads ==
Italy	Nepal	Rwanda	United States	Vanuatu
Emilia Bartram (c); Himanshi Daluwatta; Ishara Jayamannage (wk); Pasindi Kanankege; Alexia Kontopirakis; Chathurika Mahamalage; Sadalee Malwatta; Emma Moore; Dilaisha Nanayakkara; Kumudu Peddrick; Amaya Rajapaksha; Methnara Rathnayake (wk); Ilenia Sims; Sonia Toffoletto	Indu Barma (c); Puja Mahato (vc); Suman Bist; Rachana Chaudhary; Rubina Chhetry; Kabita Joshi; Anu Kadayat; Samjhana Khadka; Kabita Kunwar; Rubi Poddar (wk); Bindu Rawal; Riya Sharma; Roma Thapa; Manisha Upadhayay	Marie Bimenyimana (c); Alice Ikuzwe; Flora Irakoze (wk); Rosine Irera; Gisele Ishimwe; Henriette Ishimwe; Belise Murekatete; Shakila Niyomuhoza; Rosette Shimwamana; Clarrisse Umutoniwase; Fanny Utagushimaninde; Geovanis Uwase; Merveille Uwase (wk); Ruth Uwimana	Aditiba Chudasama (c); Jivana Aras; Gargi Bhogle; Taranum Chopra; Nikhar Doshi; Pooja Ganesh (wk); Aparna Gurumurthy; Sainavi Kambalapalli; Maahi Madhavan; Chetna Pagydyala; Chetnaa Prasad; Lekha Shetty; Ritu Singh; Suhani Thadani; Isani Vaghela	Rachel Andrew (c); Alvina Chilia (vc); Gillian Chilia (wk); Melissa Fare; Anna Griffin; Natalia Kakor; Valenta Langiatu; Nasimana Navaika; Rayline Ova; Selina Solman; Susan Stephen; Mahina Tarimiala (wk); Maselin Thompson; Vanessa Vira

== Points table ==
Pos	Team	Pld	W	L	NR	Pts	NRR	Result
1	United States	8	6	1	1	13	2.353	Champions
2	Nepal	8	5	3	0	10	0.615	Runners-up
3	Rwanda	8	4	3	1	9	−0.048	
4	Italy	8	3	5	0	6	−1.231	
5	Vanuatu	8	1	7	0	2	−1.595	

Source: Cricinfo

== Fixtures ==
18 April 2026
09:00
Scorecard

Italy; 72/1 (11 overs)	v	Rwanda; 50/4 (7 overs)
Alexia Kontopirakis 45* (37); Ruth Uwimana 1/12 (2 overs)		Merveille Uwase 12* (10); Ilenia Sims 2/11 (2 overs)

Italy won by 16 runs (DLS method)
Gahanga International Cricket Stadium, Kigali
Umpires: Ravi Angara (Bot) and Forster Mutizwa (Zim)
Player of the match: Alexia Kontopirakis (Ita)

- Rwanda won the toss and elected to field.
- Rwanda were set a revised target of 67 runs in 7 overs due to rain.
- Ruth Uwimana (Rwa) made her T20I debut.

18 April 2026
13:00
Scorecard

United States; 123/6 (20 overs)	v	Nepal; 79/9 (20 overs)
Pooja Ganesh 47 (49); Manisha Upadhayay 2/18 (4 overs)		Bindu Rawal 27 (45); Maahi Madhavan 2/11 (2 overs)

United States won by 44 runs
Gahanga International Cricket Stadium, Kigali
Umpires: David Odhiambo (Ken) and Langton Rusere (Zim)
Player of the match: Pooja Ganesh (USA)

- Nepal won the toss and elected to field.
- Sainavi Kambalapalli (USA) made her T20I debut.

19 April 2026
09:00
Scorecard

Rwanda; 109/8 (20 overs)	v	Vanuatu; 68 (19.3 overs)
Gisele Ishimwe 34 (31); Vanessa Vira 3/8 (4 overs)		Susan Stephen 20 (29); Belise Murekatete 3/6 (3.3 overs)

Rwanda won by 41 runs
Gahanga B Ground, Kigali
Umpires: Forster Mutizwa (Zim) and Langton Rusere (Zim)
Player of the match: Marie Bimenyimana (Rwa)

- Rwanda won the toss and elected to bat.

19 April 2026
13:00
Scorecard

Nepal; 112/8 (20 overs)	v	Italy; 62 (18.4 overs)
Puja Mahato 48* (45); Emilia Bartram 3/21 (3 overs)		Chathurika Mahamalage 22* (46); Rubina Chhetry 4/4 (2.4 overs)

Nepal won by 50 runs
Gahanga B Ground, Kigali
Umpires: Ravi Angara (Bot) and David Odhiambo (Ken)
Player of the match: Rubina Chhetry (Nep)

- Nepal won the toss and elected to bat.

21 April 2026
09:00
Scorecard

Rwanda; 127/4 (20 overs)	v	United States; 126/5 (20 overs)
Gisele Ishimwe 42 (34); Taranum Chopra 2/5 (2 overs)		Gargi Bhogle 35* (35); Henriette Ishimwe 2/20 (4 overs)

Rwanda won by 1 run
Gahanga International Cricket Stadium, Kigali
Umpires: Ravi Angara (Bot) and Langton Rusere (Zim)
Player of the match: Gisele Ishimwe (Rwa)

- Rwanda won the toss and elected to bat.

21 April 2026
13:00
Scorecard

Vanuatu; 114/6 (20 overs)	v	Italy; 115/6 (19.3 overs)
Nasimana Navaika 36 (39); Pasindi Kanankege 1/12 (2 overs)		Ilenia Sims 61* (51); Vanessa Vira 2/13 (4 overs)

Italy won by 4 wickets
Gahanga International Cricket Stadium, Kigali
Umpires: Ravi Angara (Bot) and David Odhiambo (Ken)
Player of the match: Ilenia Sims (Ita)

- Italy won the toss and elected to field.

22 April 2026
09:00
Scorecard

Rwanda; 88 (19.4 overs)	v	Nepal; 89/8 (19.4 overs)
Alice Ikuzwe 17 (31); Rachana Chaudhary 3/12 (3 overs)		Samjhana Khadka 48 (42); Geovanis Uwase 3/14 (4 overs)

Nepal won by 2 wickets
Gahanga B Ground, Kigali
Umpires: Forster Mutizwa (Zim) and David Odhiambo (Ken)
Player of the match: Samjhana Khadka (Nep)

- Rwanda won the toss and elected to bat.

22 April 2026
13:00
Scorecard

United States; 153/6 (20 overs)	v	Vanuatu; 100 (20 overs)
Chetna Pagydyala 81* (61); Vanessa Vira 2/15 (4 overs)		Selina Solman 40 (40); Aditiba Chudasama 4/15 (4 overs)

United States won by 53 runs
Gahanga B Ground, Kigali
Umpires: Forster Mutizwa (Zim) and Langton Rusere (Zim)
Player of the match: Chetna Pagydyala (USA)

- United States won the toss and elected to bat.

24 April 2026
09:00
Scorecard

Vanuatu; 97/5 (20 overs)	v	Nepal; 75 (15.3 overs)
Valenta Langiatu 42 (50); Riya Sharma 2/11 (4 overs)		Samjhana Khadka 24 (19); Vanessa Vira 3/11 (3.3 overs)

Vanuatu won by 22 runs
Gahanga International Cricket Stadium, Kigali
Umpires: Forster Mutizwa (Zim) and David Odhiambo (Ken)
Player of the match: Nasimana Navaika (Van)

- Vanuatu won the toss and elected to bat.

24 April 2026
13:00
Scorecard

United States; 146/6 (20 overs)	v	Italy; 74 (16 overs)
Isani Vaghela 52 (53); Thilini Fernando 4/24 (4 overs)		Emma Moore 27 (31); Maahi Madhavan 2/8 (2 overs)

United States won by 72 runs
Gahanga International Cricket Stadium, Kigali
Umpires: Ravi Angara (Bot) and David Odhiambo (Ken)
Player of the match: Isani Vaghela (USA)

- United States won the toss and elected to bat.
- Nikhar Doshi (USA) made her T20I debut.

26 April 2026
09:00
Scorecard

Rwanda; 133/5 (20 overs)	v	Vanuatu; 130/3 (20 overs)
Merveille Uwase 60 (43); Selina Solman 2/20 (4 overs)		Valenta Langiatu 71* (63); Rosine Irera 1/17 (3 overs)

Rwanda won by 3 runs
Gahanga B Ground, Kigali
Umpires: Ravi Angara (Bot) and Langton Rusere (Zim)
Player of the match: Merveille Uwase (Rwa)

- Rwanda won the toss and elected to bat.

26 April 2026
13:00
Scorecard

Nepal; 86/6 (20 overs)	v	United States; 89/3 (11.5 overs)
Rubi Poddar 51* (51); Maahi Madhavan 2/16 (4 overs)		Isani Vaghela 35* (29); Puja Mahato 1/9 (1 over)

United States won by 7 wickets
Gahanga B Ground, Kigali
Umpires: Forster Mutizwa (Zim) and Langton Rusere (Zim)
Player of the match: Isani Vaghela (USA)

- Nepal won the toss and elected to bat.

27 April 2026
09:00
Scorecard

Italy; 123/7 (20 overs)	v	Rwanda; 126/4 (19.3 overs)
Ilenia Sims 37 (39); Rosine Irera 2/17 (4 overs)		Fanny Utagushimaninde 36 (30); Emma Moore 1/12 (2 overs)

Rwanda won by 6 wickets
Gahanga International Cricket Stadium, Kigali
Umpires: Forster Mutizwa (Zim) and Langton Rusere (Zim)
Player of the match: Fanny Utagushimaninde (Rwa)

- Italy won the toss and elected to bat.

27 April 2026
13:00
Scorecard

United States; 162/4 (20 overs)	v	Vanuatu; 90/8 (20 overs)
Isani Vaghela 54 (41); Vanessa Vira 2/25 (4 overs)		Valenta Langiatu 25 (21); Lekha Shetty 4/16 (4 overs)

United States won by 72 runs
Gahanga International Cricket Stadium, Kigali
Umpires: Ravi Angara (Bot) and David Odhiambo (Ken)
Player of the match: Isani Vaghela (USA)

- United States won the toss and elected to bat.

28 April 2026
09:00
Scorecard

Nepal; 103/7 (20 overs)	v	Rwanda; 65 (17.4 overs)
Indu Barma 33* (45); Henriette Ishimwe 3/20 (4 overs)		Marie Bimenyimana 19 (27); Manisha Upadhayay 3/10 (4 overs)

Nepal won by 38 runs
Gahanga B Ground, Kigali
Umpires: David Odhiambo (Ken) and Langton Rusere (Zim)
Player of the match: Manisha Upadhayay (Nep)

- Nepal won the toss and elected to bat.

28 April 2026
13:00
Scorecard

Vanuatu; 153/2 (20 overs)	v	Italy; 96/4 (11.5 overs)
Susan Stephen 51 (42); Ilenia Sims 2/30 (4 overs)		Emilia Bartram 54* (33); Vanessa Vira 3/21 (3 overs)

Italy won by 8 runs (DLS method)
Gahanga B Ground, Kigali
Umpires: Ravi Angara (Bot) and Forster Mutizwa (Zim)
Player of the match: Emilia Bartram (Ita)

- Italy won the toss and elected to field.
- No further play was possible due to rain.

30 April 2026
09:00
Scorecard

Italy; 99/8 (20 overs)	v	United States; 101/1 (16.1 overs)
Alexia Kontopirakis 49 (56); Sainavi Kambalapalli 2/12 (4 overs)		Sainavi Kambalapalli 52* (51); Thilini Fernando 1/7 (4 overs)

United States won by 9 wickets
Gahanga International Cricket Stadium, Kigali
Umpires: Ravi Angara (Bot) and Forster Mutizwa (Zim)
Player of the match: Sainavi Kambalapalli (USA)

- Italy won the toss and elected to bat.

30 April 2026
13:00
Scorecard

Nepal; 132/3 (20 overs)	v	Vanuatu; 49 (16.4 overs)
Samjhana Khadka 52 (51); Nasimana Navaika 1/21 (4 overs)		Valenta Langiatu 14 (19); Kabita Kunwar 6/5 (3.4 overs)

Nepal won by 83 runs
Gahanga International Cricket Stadium, Kigali
Umpires: David Odhiambo (Ken) and Langton Rusere (Zim)
Player of the match: Kabita Kunwar (Nep)

- Nepal won the toss and elected to bat.
- Kabita Kunwar (Nep) took her maiden five-wicket haul and first hat-trick in WT20Is.

1 May 2026
09:00
Scorecard

United States; 62/4 (15.3 overs)	v	Rwanda
Isani Vaghela 29 (45); Rosine Irera 3/16 (4 overs)

No result
Gahanga B Ground, Kigali
Umpires: Ravi Angara (Bot) and David Odhiambo (Ken)

- United States won the toss and elected to bat.
- No further play was possible due to rain.
- Aparna Gurumurthy (USA) made her T20I debut.

1 May 2026
13:00
Scorecard

Italy; 36/6 (7 overs)	v	Nepal; 40/2 (3.3 overs)
Emilia Bartram 14 (14); Manisha Upadhayay 3/10 (2 overs)		Puja Mahato 13 (6); Emma Moore 1/16 (1 over)

Nepal won by 8 wickets
Gahanga B Ground, Kigali
Umpires: Forster Mutizwa (Zim) and Langton Rusere (Zim)
Player of the match: Manisha Upadhayay (Nep)

- Nepal won the toss and elected to field.
- The match was reduced to 7 overs per side due to rain.
