= 2025 Nepal Women's Tri-Nation Series =

Cricket tournament

- Date: 30 January–7 February 2025
- Location: Nepal
- Result: Thailand won the series
Teams
Nepal	Netherlands	Thailand
Captains
Indu Barma	Babette de Leede	Naruemol Chaiwai
Most runs
Puja Mahato (134)	Sterre Kalis (160)	Nannapat Koncharoenkai (166)
Most wickets
Manisha Upadhayay (7)	Iris Zwilling (11)	Thipatcha Putthawong (16)

The 2025 Nepal Women's Tri-Nation Series was a cricket series that took place in Nepal in January and February 2025. It was a tri-nation series involving Nepal, Netherlands and Thailand cricket teams, with the matches played as Twenty20 International (T20I) fixtures. It was the first women's tri-nation international series hosted by Nepal. All of the matches were played at the Tribhuvan University International Cricket Ground in Kirtipur. The tournament was played in a triple round-robin format. Nepal and Netherlands faced each other for the first time in women's T20Is during the series.

Thailand won the tournament.

== Squads ==
Nepal	Netherlands	Thailand
Indu Barma (c); Rajmati Airee; Ishwori Bist; Rubina Chhetry; Mamta Chaudhary; Rachana Chaudhary; Rewati Dhami; Kabita Joshi; Samjhana Khadka; Kabita Kunwar; Sita Rana Magar; Puja Mahato; Bindu Rawal; Roma Thapa; Manisha Upadhayay; Alisha Yadav (wk)	Babette de Leede (c, wk); Caroline de Lange; Sterre Kalis; Hannah Landheer; Eva Lynch; Phebe Molkenboer; Frederique Overdijk; Robine Rijke; Heather Siegers; Silver Siegers; Myrthe van den Raad; Isabel van der Woning; Carlijn van Koolwijk; Iris Zwilling	Naruemol Chaiwai (c); Nattaya Boochatham; Nannaphat Chaihan; Natthakan Chantham; Sunida Chaturongrattana; Onnicha Kamchomphu; Rosenanee Kanoh; Suwanan Khiaoto (wk); Nannapat Koncharoenkai (wk); Suleeporn Laomi; Phannita Maya; Thipatcha Putthawong; Chanida Sutthiruang; Aphisara Suwanchonrathi

== Points table ==
Pos	Team	Pld	W	L	T	NR	Pts	NRR
1	Thailand	6	5	1	0	0	10	0.484
2	Netherlands	6	4	2	0	0	8	0.098
3	Nepal	6	0	6	0	0	0	−0.630

Source: ESPNcricinfo

== Fixtures ==
30 January 2025
12:15
Scorecard

Netherlands; 157/4 (20 overs)	v	Nepal; 137/7 (20 overs)
Robine Rijke 59* (48); Kabita Kunwar 1/14 (2 overs)		Sita Rana Magar 28 (45); Eva Lynch 2/30 (4 overs)

Netherlands won by 20 runs
Tribhuvan University International Cricket Ground, Kirtipur
Umpires: Ram Pandey (Nep) and Buddhi Pradhan (Nep)
Player of the match: Robine Rijke (Ned)

- Nepal won the toss and elected to field.
- Manisha Upadhayay and Alisha Yadav (Nep) both made their T20I debuts.

31 January 2025
12:15
Scorecard

Netherlands; 122/6 (20 overs)	v	Thailand; 125/2 (18 overs)
Babette de Leede 52 (50); Thipatcha Putthawong 2/27 (4 overs)		Nannapat Koncharoenkai 56* (50); Caroline de Lange 1/22 (3 overs)

Thailand won by 8 wickets
Tribhuvan University International Cricket Ground, Kirtipur
Umpires: Vinay Kumar Jha (Nep) and Ujjwal Regmi (Nep)
Player of the match: Nannapat Koncharoenkai (Tha)

- Netherlands won the toss and elected to bat.

1 February 2025
12:15
Scorecard

Nepal; 101/9 (20 overs)	v	Thailand; 102/6 (19 overs)
Bindu Rawal 25 (25); Thipatcha Putthawong 3/17 (4 overs)		Nannapat Koncharoenkai 60* (58); Manisha Upadhayay 2/13 (4 overs)

Thailand won by 4 wickets
Tribhuvan University International Cricket Ground, Kirtipur
Umpires: Vinay Kumar Jha (Nep) and Buddhi Pradhan (Nep)
Player of the match: Nannapat Koncharoenkai (Tha)

- Nepal won the toss and elected to bat.

2 February 2025
12:15
Scorecard

Netherlands; 140/9 (20 overs)	v	Nepal; 125/8 (20 overs)
Babette de Leede 41 (38); Sita Rana Magar 5/12 (3 overs)		Indu Barma 30 (32); Heather Siegers 2/10 (2 overs)

Netherlands won by 15 runs
Tribhuvan University International Cricket Ground, Kirtipur
Umpires: Buddhi Pradhan (Nep) and Kamalesh Thakur (Nep)
Player of the match: Heather Siegers (Ned)

- Netherlands won the toss and elected to bat.
- Rewati Dhami (Nep) made her T20I debut.

3 February 2025
12:15
Scorecard

Thailand; 86 (19.5 overs)	v	Netherlands; 69 (15.5 overs)
Chanida Sutthiruang 27 (28); Silver Siegers 2/9 (4 overs)		Babette de Leede 25 (21); Thipatcha Putthawong 3/10 (4 overs)

Thailand won by 17 runs
Tribhuvan University International Cricket Ground, Kirtipur
Umpires: Vinay Kumar Jha (Nep) and Ram Pandey (Nep)
Player of the match: Chanida Sutthiruang (Tha)

- Netherlands won the toss and elected to field.

4 February 2025
12:15
Scorecard

Thailand; 106/6 (20 overs)	v	Nepal; 101/8 (20 overs)
Chanida Sutthiruang 27* (28); Manisha Upadhayay 3/18 (4 overs)		Rubina Chhetry 26 (30); Thipatcha Putthawong 4/10 (4 overs)

Thailand won by 5 runs
Tribhuvan University International Cricket Ground, Kirtipur
Umpires: Buddhi Pradhan (Nep) and Kamalesh Thakur (Nep)
Player of the match: Thipatcha Putthawong (Tha)

- Thailand won the toss and elected to bat.
- Rachana Chaudhary (Nep) made her T20I debut.

5 February 2025
12:15
Scorecard

Nepal; 145/4 (20 overs)	v	Netherlands; 151/0 (19.4 overs)
Puja Mahato 62* (51); Iris Zwilling 2/25 (4 overs)		Sterre Kalis 98* (69)

Netherlands won by 10 wickets
Tribhuvan University International Cricket Ground, Kirtipur
Umpires: Vinay Kumar Jha (Nep) and Buddhi Pradhan (Nep)
Player of the match: Sterre Kalis (Ned)

- Nepal won the toss and elected to bat.

6 February 2025
12:15
Scorecard

Thailand; 109/5 (20 overs)	v	Netherlands; 110/9 (20 overs)
Natthakan Chantham 36* (46); Iris Zwilling 3/9 (4 overs)		Phebe Molkenboer 32 (42); Thipatcha Putthawong 4/12 (4 overs)

Netherlands won by 1 wicket
Tribhuvan University International Cricket Ground, Kirtipur
Umpires: Vinay Kumar Jha (Nep) and Ram Pandey (Nep)
Player of the match: Iris Zwilling (Ned)

- Thailand won the toss and elected to bat.

7 February 2025
12:15
Scorecard

Nepal; 81/7 (20 overs)	v	Thailand; 82/3 (17 overs)
Samjhana Khadka 17 (29); Onnicha Kamchomphu 3/15 (4 overs)		Naruemol Chaiwai 27* (34); Indu Barma 2/16 (4 overs)

Thailand won by 7 wickets
Tribhuvan University International Cricket Ground, Kirtipur
Umpires: Vinay Kumar Jha (Nep) and Ujjwal Regmi (Nep)
Player of the match: Onnicha Kamchomphu (Tha)

- Nepal won the toss and elected to bat.
- Rajmati Airee (Nep) made her T20I debut.
