= 2019 Thailand Women's T20 Smash =

- Dates: 12 – 19 January 2019
- Administrator: Cricket Association of Thailand
- Cricket format: 20 overs, Twenty20 International
- Tournament format(s): Group round-robin and playoffs
- Host: Thailand
- Champions: Thailand
- Runners-up: Nepal
- Participants: 10
- Matches: 28
- Most runs: (United Arab Emirates) Esha Oza (229)
- Most wickets: (Thailand) Suleeporn Laomi (12)

The 2019 Thailand Women's T20 Smash was a Twenty20 International (T20I) cricket tournament held in Bangkok, Thailand from 12 to 19 January 2019. The participants were the women's national sides of Thailand, Bhutan, China, Hong Kong, Indonesia, Malaysia, Myanmar, Nepal and United Arab Emirates, as well as a Thailand A side. Matches (except those involving Thailand A) were recognised as official T20I games as per the International Cricket Council's announcement that full T20I status would apply to all the matches played between women's teams of associate member nations after 1 July 2018. The matches were played at the Asian Institute of Technology Ground and the Terdthai Cricket Ground, both in Bangkok. Thailand won the tournament after winning all of their matches.

On 13 January, while chasing a first innings score of 203/3, China were bowled out by the United Arab Emirates for just 14 runs. This was the lowest ever total in a women's T20I and the biggest margin of defeat, until Mali recorded four lower totals in June 2019 during the 2019 Kwibuka Women's T20 Tournament.

== Group stage ==
=== Group A ===
==== Points table ====
Pos	Team	Pld	W	L	T	NR	Pts	NRR
1	Nepal	4	4	0	0	0	8	2.077
2	United Arab Emirates	4	3	1	0	0	6	4.032
3	Malaysia	4	2	2	0	0	4	−0.367
4	Thailand A	4	1	3	0	0	2	−2.140
5	China	4	0	4	0	0	0	−3.955

==== Fixtures ====
12 January 2019
09:30
Scorecard

China; 48/6 (20 overs)	v	Nepal; 49/0 (8.4 overs)
Zhang Chan 13 (38); Karuna Bhandari 3/9 (4 overs)		Sita Rana Magar 24* (25)

Nepal won by 10 wickets
Asian Institute of Technology Ground, Bangkok
Umpires: Narayanan Sivan (Mas) and KB Suresh (Tha)
Player of the match: Karuna Bhandari (Nep)

- Nepal won the toss and elected to field.
- Indu Barma, Karuna Bhandari, Dolly Bhatta, Rubina Chhetry, Kabita Kunwar, Sarita Magar, Sita Rana Magar, Bindu Rawal, Kajal Shrestha, Nary Thapa and Roma Thapa (Nep) all made their T20I debuts.

12 January 2019
09:30
Scorecard

United Arab Emirates; 126/5 (20 overs)	v	Thailand A 65/9 (20 overs)
Kavisha Egodage 42 (42); Sirilak Trinarong 2/11 (3 overs)		Chamaiphon Chaisitsroi 16 (29); Namita D'souza 3/11 (4 overs)

United Arab Emirates won by 61 runs
Terdthai Cricket Ground, Bangkok
Umpires: Viswanadan Kalidas (Mas) and Ramasamy Venkatesh (Mas)
Player of the match: Esha Oza (UAE)

- Thailand A won the toss and elected to field.

13 January 2019
09:30
Scorecard

Malaysia; 61 (19.3 overs)	v	Nepal; 62/4 (16.2 overs)
Elsa Hunter 12 (22); Sarita Magar 4/11 (3.3 overs)		Roma Thapa 20* (24); Jamahidaya Intan 1/5 (2 overs)

Nepal won by 6 wickets
Terdthai Cricket Ground, Bangkok
Umpires: Arif Ansari (Tha) and Ramasamy Venkatesh (HK)
Player of the match: Sarita Magar (Nep)

- Malaysia won the toss and elected to bat.
- Elsa Hunter, Nur Arianna Natsya (Mas) and Mamta Chaudhary (Nep) all made their T20I debuts.

13 January 2019
13:30
Scorecard

United Arab Emirates; 203/3 (20 overs)	v	China; 14 (10 overs)
Esha Oza 82 (62); Zhang Xiangxue 1/33 (4 overs)		Han Lili 4 (12); Ishni Mananelage 3/0 (1 over)

United Arab Emirates won by 189 runs
Asian Institute of Technology Ground, Bangkok
Umpires: Viswanadan Kalidas (Mas) and Tauseef Khalid (Tha)
Player of the match: Esha Oza (UAE)

- United Arab Emirates won the toss and elected to bat.
- Liu Chang (Chn), Charvi Bhatt and Vaishnave Mahesh (UAE) all made their T20I debuts.

14 January 2019
13:30
Scorecard

United Arab Emirates; 105/6 (20 overs)	v	Nepal; 106/4 (19 overs)
Chaya Mughal 31 (43); Karuna Bhandari 1/11 (2 overs)		Sita Rana Magar 37 (35); Esha Oza 1/13 (4 overs)

Nepal won by 6 wickets
Asian Institute of Technology Ground, Bangkok
Umpires: Narayanan Sivan (Mas) and Ramasamy Venkatesh (Mas)
Player of the match: Sita Rana Magar (Nep)

- United Arab Emirates won the toss and elected to bat.
- Sonu Khadka (Nep) made her T20I debut.

14 January 2019
13:30
Scorecard

Malaysia; 97/2 (20 overs)	v	Thailand A 63/9 (20 overs)
Elsa Hunter 34* (40); Manatsawee Jatho 1/15 (3 overs)		Rosenanee Kanoh 11 (36); Nur Nadihirah 5/2 (4 overs)

Malaysia won by 34 runs
Terdthai Cricket Ground, Bangkok
Umpires: Arif Ansari (Tha) and KB Suresh (Tha)
Player of the match: Nur Nadihirah (Mas)

- Malaysia won the toss and elected to bat.

15 January 2019
09:30
Scorecard

United Arab Emirates; 162/2 (20 overs)	v	Malaysia; 85/7 (20 overs)
Esha Oza 67 (50); Emylia Eliani 1/13 (2 overs)		Emylia Eliani 20* (32); Esha Oza 2/15 (3 overs)

United Arab Emirates won by 77 runs
Asian Institute of Technology Ground, Bangkok
Umpires: Ramasamy Venkatesh (Mas) and Tauseef Khalid (Tha)
Player of the match: Esha Oza (UAE)

- United Arab Emirates won the toss and elected to bat.
- Suraksha Kotte (UAE) made her T20I debut.

15 January 2019
13:30
Scorecard

China; 68/8 (20 overs)	v	Thailand A 69/5 (18.2 overs)
Zhang Yanling 16 (27); Rosenanee Kanoh 5/4 (4 overs)		Phannita Maya 19* (29); Zhang Xiangxue 1/8 (4 overs); Han Lili 1/8 (4 overs)

Thailand A won by 5 wickets
Terdthai Cricket Ground, Bangkok
Umpires: Arif Ansari (Tha) and Narayanan Sivan (Mas)
Player of the match: Rosenanee Kanoh (Thailand A)

- China won the toss and elected to bat.

16 January 2019
09:30
Scorecard

China; 39 (18.4 overs)	v	Malaysia; 40/4 (12.3 overs)
Zhang Chan 11 (27); Mas Elysa 6/3 (4 overs)		Yusrina Yaakop 10* (43); Han Lili 2/11 (3.3 overs)

Malaysia won by 6 wickets
Asian Institute of Technology Ground, Bangkok
Umpires: Ryan Raina (Tha) and Ramasamy Venkatesh (Mas)
Player of the match: Mas Elysa (Mas)

- China won the toss and elected to bat.

16 January 2019
09:30
Scorecard

Thailand A 19 (15.4 overs)	v	Nepal; 20/1 (3.3 overs)
Thanchanok Phopluk 4* (24); Aarati Bidari 3/5 (4 overs)		Mamta Chaudhary 8 (9); Phannita Maya 1/4 (1 over)

Nepal won by 9 wickets
Terdthai Cricket Ground, Bangkok
Umpires: Narayanan Sivan (Mas) and Viswanadan Kalidas (Mas)
Player of the match: Aarati Bidari (Nep)

- Thailand A won the toss an elected to bat

=== Group B ===
==== Points table ====
Pos	Team	Pld	W	L	T	NR	Pts	NRR
1	Thailand	4	4	0	0	0	8	3.938
2	Indonesia	4	3	1	0	0	6	0.410
3	Hong Kong	4	2	2	0	0	4	−0.677
4	Myanmar	4	1	3	0	0	2	−2.050
5	Bhutan	4	0	4	0	0	0	−1.628

==== Fixtures ====
12 January 2019
13:30
Scorecard

Hong Kong; 70/7 (20 overs)	v	Indonesia; 71/4 (14.3 overs)
Betty Chan 20* (28); Ni Made Putri Suwandewi 3/16 (4 overs)		Ni Putu Ayu Nanda Sakarini 17 (21); Ruchitha Venkatesh 1/8 (3 overs)

Indonesia won by 6 wickets
Asian Institute of Technology Ground, Bangkok
Umpires: Narayanan Sivan (Mas) and Tauseef Khalid (Tha)
Player of the match: Ni Made Putri Suwandewi (Idn)

- Hong Kong won the toss and elected to bat.
- Betty Chan, Kary Chan, Hiu Ying Cheung, Yasmin Daswani, Mariko Hill, Bella Poon, Shanzeen Shahzad, Alison Siu, Jasmine Titmuss, Ruchitha Venkatesh, Mehreen Yousaf (HK), Andriani, Yulia Anggraeni, Puji Haryanti, Kadek Winda Prastini, Ni Kadek Fitria Rada Rani, Ni Putu Ayu Nanda Sakarini, Ni Wayan Sariani, Netty Sitompul, Annisa Sulistianingsih, Ni Made Putri Suwandewi and Yuliana (Idn) all made their T20I debuts.

12 January 2019
13:30
Scorecard

Myanmar; 45 (18.1 overs)	v	Thailand; 46/0 (5.3 overs)
Zar Win 18 (32); Nattaya Boochatham 2/2 (2 overs)		Naruemol Chaiwai 22* (17)

Thailand won by 10 wickets
Terdthai Cricket Ground, Bangkok
Umpires: Arif Ansari (Tha) and Viswanadan Kalidas (Mas)
Player of the match: Sornnarin Tippoch (Tha)

- Myanmar won the toss and elected to bat.
- Thipatcha Putthawong (Tha), Htet Aung, Thae Thae Aung, Lin Htun, Zin Kyaw, Zon Lin, Aye Moe, Khin Myat, May San, Theint Soe, Zar Thoon and Zar Win (Mya) all made their T20I debuts.
- At the age of 18 years and 337 days, Aye Moe (Mya) became the youngest cricketer to captain a side in a T20I match.

13 January 2019
09:30
Scorecard

Indonesia; 102/8 (20 overs)	v	Myanmar; 50 (19.1 overs)
Ni Kadek Fitria Rada Rani 25* (27); Zon Lin 6/10 (4 overs)		Lin Htun 13 (35); Ni Wayan Sariani 3/14 (4 overs)

Indonesia won by 52 runs
Asian Institute of Technology Ground, Bangkok
Umpires: Narayanan Sivan (Mas) and Tauseef Khalid (Tha)
Player of the match: Zon Lin (Mya)

- Indonesia won the toss and elected to bat
- Edenyce Eduard (Idn) and Htwe Neaung (Mya) both made their T20I debuts.

13 January 2019
13:30
Scorecard

Bhutan; 71/5 (20 overs)	v	Hong Kong; 72/7 (18 overs)
Yeshey Wangmo 15 (29); Mehreen Yousaf 2/12 (3 overs)		Yasmin Daswani 21 (40); Dechen Wangmo 3/17 (4 overs)

Hong Kong won by 3 wickets
Terdthai Cricket Ground, Bangkok
Umpires: Arif Ansari (Tha) and KB Suresh (Tha)
Player of the match: Dechen Wangmo (Bhu)

- Bhutan won the toss and elected to bat.
- Ritshi Choden, Sonam Choden, Yshey Choden, Karma Dema, Anju Gurung, Sonam Paldon, Pema Seldon, Dechen Wangmo, Yeshey Wangmo, Tshering Yangchen, Tshering Zangmo (Bhu), Jaswinder Kaur and Emma Lai (HK) all made their T20I debuts.

14 January 2019
09:30
Scorecard

Indonesia; 104/4 (20 overs)	v	Bhutan; 54 (16.3 overs)
Yulia Anggraeni 43 (41); Anju Gurung 2/16 (4 overs)		Dechen Wangmo 15 (15); Andriani 4/15 (4 overs)

Indonesia won by 50 runs
Asian Institute of Technology Ground, Bangkok
Umpires: Tauseef Khalid (Tha) and Narayanan Sivan (Mas)
Player of the match: Andriani (Idn)

- Indonesia won the toss and elected to bat.
- Tashi Lhaden (Bhu) and Berlian Duma Pare (Idn) both made their T20I debuts.

14 January 2019
09:30
Scorecard

Thailand; 107/4 (20 overs)	v	Hong Kong; 42 (16.1 overs)
Naruemol Chaiwai 45 (52); Kary Chan 1/17 (3 overs)		Kary Chan 13 (27); Nattaya Boochatham 4/4 (4 overs)

Thailand won by 65 runs
Terdthai Cricket Ground, Bangkok
Umpires: Arif Ansari (Tha) and Viswanadan Kalidas (Mas)
Player of the match: Nattaya Boochatham (Tha)

- Hong Kong won the toss and elected to field.
- Arriya Yenyueak (Tha) and Annie Ho (HK) both made their T20I debuts.

15 January 2019
09:30
Scorecard

Bhutan; 87/9 (20 overs)	v	Myanmar; 88/3 (17.3 overs)
Sonam Paldon 18 (26); Theint Soe 2/13 (2 overs)		Lin Htun 29* (44); Tshering Zangmo 2/21 (4 overs)

Myanmar won by 7 wickets
Terdthai Cricket Ground, Bangkok
Umpires: Arif Ansari (Tha) and Narayanan Sivan (Mas)
Player of the match: Theint Soe (Mya)

- Myanmar won the toss and elected to field.
- Ngawang Choden, Thukten Dema (Bhu) and Yu Yu Mar (Mya) all made their T20I debuts.

15 January 2019
13:30
Scorecard

Thailand; 125/3 (20 overs)	v	Indonesia; 32 (14.2 overs)
Nattaya Boochatham 56 (44); Ni Wayan Sariani 1/19 (4 overs)		Ni Kadek Fitria Rada Rani 5* (17); Chanida Sutthiruang 5/4 (4 overs)

Thailand won by 93 runs
Asian Institute of Technology Ground, Bangkok
Umpires: Viswanadan Kalidas (Mas) and Ramasamy Venkatesh (HK)
Player of the match: Chanida Sutthiruang (Tha)

- Thailand won the toss and elected to bat.
- Aulia Avianty (Idn) made her T20I debut.

16 January 2019
13:30
Scorecard

Myanmar; 90/7 (20 overs)	v	Hong Kong; 91/3 (13 overs)
Lin Htun 17 (46); Jasmine Titmuss 2/13 (4 overs)		Kary Chan 28* (27); Zin Kyaw 2/27 (4 overs)

Hong Kong won by 7 wickets
Terdthai Cricket Ground, Bangkok
Umpires: Arif Ansari (Tha) and Viswanadan Kalidas (Mas)
Player of the match: Kary Chan (HK)

- Hong Kong won the toss and elected to field.

16 January 2019
13:30
Scorecard

Bhutan; 46/9 (20 overs)	v	Thailand; 49/0 (9 overs)
Sonam Choden 17 (34); Nattaya Boochatham 2/5 (4 overs)		Natthakan Chantam 24* (28)

Thailand won by 10 wickets
Asian Institute of Technology Ground, Bangkok
Umpires: Ramasamy Venkatesh (HK) and Tauseef Khalid (Tha)
Player of the match: Onnicha Kamchomphu (Tha)

- Bhutan won the toss and elected to bat.

== Consolation play-offs ==
=== Consolation semi-finals ===
18 January 2019
09:30
Scorecard

Malaysia; 100/6 (20 overs)	v	Myanmar; 101/6 (19.5 overs)
Christina Baret 29* (33); Zin Kyaw 2/17 (4 overs)		Zon Lin 22 (23); Nur Arianna Natsya 3/25 (4 overs)

Myanmar won by 4 wickets
Asian Institute of Technology Ground, Bangkok
Umpires: KB Suresh (Tha) and Tauseef Khalid (Tha)
Player of the match: Nur Arianna Natsya (Mas)

- Malaysia won the toss and elected to bat.

18 January 2019
13:30
Scorecard

Hong Kong; 109/1 (20 overs)	v	Thailand A 58/7 (20 overs)
Bella Poon 28 (32); Rosenanee Kanoh 2/8 (4 overs)		Phannita Maya 13 (18); Alison Siu 2/5 (3 overs)

Hong Kong won by 51 runs
Asian Institute of Technology Ground, Bangkok
Umpires: Narayanan Sivan (Mas) and Tauseef Khalid (Tha)
Player of the match: Kary Chan (HK)

- Hong Kong won the toss and elected to bat.

=== 7th place play-off ===
19 January 2019
13:30
Scorecard

Malaysia; 133/3 (20 overs)	v	Thailand A 49 (17.1 overs)
Winifred Duraisingam 56* (59); Manatsawee Jatho 2/21 (4 overs)		Rosenanee Kanoh 16 (22); Nur Nadihirah 3/10 (4 overs)

Malaysia won by 84 runs
Asian Institute of Technology Ground, Bangkok
Umpires: Ramasamy Venkatesh (HK) and Tauseef Khalid (Tha)
Player of the match: Winifred Duraisingam (Mas)

- Malaysia won the toss and elected to bat.

=== 5th place play-off ===
19 January 2019
09:30
Scorecard

Myanmar; 46/8 (20 overs)	v	Hong Kong; 48/1 (8.1 overs)
Thae Thae Aung 14* (22); Jasmine Titmuss 3/5 (4 overs)		Yasmin Daswani 24* (26); Zin Kyaw 1/22 (4 overs)

Hong Kong won by 9 wickets
Asian Institute of Technology Ground, Bangkok
Umpires: KB Suresh (Tha) and Tauseef Khalid (Tha)
Player of the match: Jasmine Titmuss (HK)

- Hong Kong won the toss and elected to field.
- Shwe Yee Win (Mya) made her T20I debut.

== Play-offs ==
=== Semi-finals ===
18 January 2019
09:30
Scorecard

Nepal; 119/3 (20 overs)	v	Indonesia; 27 (11.1 overs)
Sita Rana Magar 48 (62); Edenyce Eduard 1/28 (4 overs)		Yulia Anggraeni 13 (14); Rubina Chhetry 4/2 (3.1 overs)

Nepal won by 92 runs
Terdthai Cricket Ground, Bangkok
Umpires: Arif Ansari (Tha) and Viswanadan Kalidas (Mas)
Player of the match: Rubina Chhetry (Nep)

- Indonesia won the toss and elected to field.

18 January 2019
13:30
Scorecard

Thailand; 91/7 (20 overs)	v	United Arab Emirates; 42 (15.4 overs)
Chanida Sutthiruang 14 (22); Namita D'souza 3/20 (3 overs)		Humaira Tasneem 9 (13); Suleeporn Laomi 4/9 (3.4 overs)

Thailand won by 49 runs
Terdthai Cricket Ground, Bangkok
Umpires: Viswanadan Kalidas (Mas) and Ramasamy Venkatesh (Mas)
Player of the match: Suleeporn Laomi (Tha)

- Thailand won the toss and elected to bat.
- Samaira Dharnidharka (UAE) made her T20I debut.

=== 3rd place play-off ===
19 January 2019
09:30
Scorecard

Indonesia; 52 (19.3 overs)	v	United Arab Emirates; 54/1 (8.3 overs)
Ni Putu Ayu Nanda Sakarini 12 (23); Chamani Seneviratne 4/2 (4 overs)		Esha Oza 26* (23); Ni Wayan Sariani 1/30 (4 overs)

United Arab Emirates won by 9 wickets
Terdthai Cricket Ground, Bangkok
Umpires: Narayanan Sivan (Mas) and Viswanadan Kalidas (Mas)
Player of the match: Chamani Seneviratne (UAE)

- Indonesia won the toss and elected to bat.
- Mahika Gaur (UAE) made her T20I debut.

=== Final ===
19 January 2019
13:30
Scorecard

Thailand; 121/1 (20 overs)	v	Nepal; 51 (17.2 overs)
Natthakan Chantam 69* (67)		Nary Thapa 17 (37); Suleeporn Laomi 3/15 (4 overs)

Thailand won by 70 runs
Terdthai Cricket Ground, Bangkok
Umpires: Narayanan Sivan (Mas) and Viswanadan Kalidas (Mas)
Player of the match: Suleeporn Laomi (Tha)

- Nepal won the toss and elected to field.
- Aarati Bidari (Nep) made her T20I debut.

== Final standings ==
Position	Team
1st	Thailand
2nd	Nepal
3rd	United Arab Emirates
4th	Indonesia
5th	Hong Kong
6th	Myanmar
7th	Malaysia
8th	Thailand A
9th	Bhutan
10th	China
