= Nepal women's cricket team in Malaysia in 2025–26 =

International cricket tour

	Malaysia	Nepal
- Dates: 2 – 8 October 2025
Captains	Winifred Duraisingam	Indu Barma

Twenty20 International series
- Results: Nepal won the 5-match series 3–2
Most runs	Ainna Hamizah Hashim (152)	Indu Barma (117)
Most wickets	Nur Dania Syuhada (7)	Kabita Kunwar (9)

The Nepal women's cricket team toured Malaysia in October 2025 to play the Malaysia women's cricket team. The tour consisted of five Twenty20 International (T20I) matches. All the matches were played at the Bayuemas Oval in Pandamaran.

Nepal won the series 3–2.

== Squads ==
Malaysia	Nepal
Winifred Duraisingam (c); Nur Alya Batrisyia; Aisya Eleesa; Mas Elysa; Ainna Hamizah Hashim; Nazatul Hidayah Husna; Mahirah Izzati Ismail; Wan Julia (wk); Suabika Manivannan; Dhanusri Muhunan; Irdina Beh Nabil; Aina Najwa (wk); Nur Arianna Natsya; Amalin Sorfina; Nur Izzatul Syafiqa; Nur Dania Syuhada	Indu Barma (c); Puja Mahato (vc); Rajmati Airee]]; Somu Bist; Yasoda Bist; Rachana Chaudhary; Rubina Chhetri; Sabitri Dhami; Kabita Joshi; Samjhana Khadka; Kabita Kunwar; Sita Rana Magar; Rubi Poddar; Riya Sharma

== T20I series ==
=== 1st T20I ===
2 October 2025
14:00
Scorecard

Malaysia; 104/5 (20 overs)	v	Nepal; 101/7 (20 overs)
Winifred Duraisingam 27 (41); Somu Bista 2/21 (4 overs)		Puja Mahato 30 (29); Nur Dania Syuhada 3/10 (4 overs)

Malaysia won by 3 runs
Bayuemas Oval, Pandamaran
Umpires: Viswanadan Kalidas (Mas) and Narayanan Sivan (Mas)
Player of the match: Nur Dania Syuhada (Mas)

- Malaysia won the toss and elected to bat.
- Nur Alya Batrisyia (Mas) and Sabitri Dhami (Nep) made their T20I debuts.

=== 2nd T20I ===
4 October 2025
10:00
Scorecard

Malaysia; 91/4 (20 overs)	v	Nepal; 93/4 (16.2 overs)
Ainna Hamizah Hashim 50* (63); Suman Bist 2/18 (4 overs)		Puja Mahato 39 (39); Ainna Hamizah Hashim 2/22 (3.2 overs)

Nepal won by 6 wickets
Bayuemas Oval, Pandamaran
Umpires: Nur Hijrah (Mas) and Narayanan Sivan (Mas)
Player of the match: Puja Mahato (Nep)

- Nepal won the toss and elected to field.

=== 3rd T20I ===
5 October 2025
10:00
Scorecard

Malaysia; 120/4 (20 overs)	v	Nepal; 107/8 (20 overs)
Ainna Hamizah Hashim 61 (58); Kabita Kunwar 2/13 (2 overs)		Rubi Poddar 31 (37); Aisya Eleesa 1/15 (4 overs)

Malaysia won by 13 runs
Bayuemas Oval, Pandamaran
Umpires: Nur Hijrah (Mas) and Viswanadan Kalidas (Mas)
Player of the match: Ainna Hamizah Hashim (Mas)

- Malaysia won the toss and elected to bat.
- Yashoda Bist (Nep) made her T20I debut.

=== 4th T20I ===
7 October 2025
10:00
Scorecard

Malaysia; 111/5 (20 overs)	v	Nepal; 115/4 (17.3 overs)
Mas Elysa 56* (63); Kabita Kunwar 3/10 (4 overs)		Indu Barma 48* (39); Ainna Hamizah Hashim 1/13 (1 over)

Nepal won by 6 wickets
Bayuemas Oval, Pandamaran
Umpires: Viswanadan Kalidas (Mas) and Narayanan Sivan (Mas)
Player of the match: Kabita Kunwar (Nep)

- Malaysia won the toss and elected to bat.
- Indu Barma (Nep) scored her 1,000th run in T20Is.

=== 5th T20I ===
8 October 2025
10:00
Scorecard

Malaysia; 103/7 (20 overs)	v	Nepal; 104/5 (18 overs)
Winifred Duraisingam 40 (46); Rajmati Airee 3/15 (3 overs)		Rubi Poddar 26 (25); Nur Alya Batrisyia Normizan 1/6 (1 over)

Nepal won by 5 wickets
Bayuemas Oval, Pandamaran
Umpires: Nur Hijrah (Mas) and Narayanan Sivan (Mas)
Player of the match: Rajmati Airee (Nep)

- Malaysia won the toss and elected to bat.
