= Nepal women's cricket team in Qatar in 2021–22 =

International cricket tour

	Qatar	Nepal
- Dates: 16 – 18 November 2021
Captains	Aysha	Rubina Chhetry

Twenty20 International series
- Results: Nepal won the 3-match series 3–0
Most runs	Aysha (37)	Sita Rana Magar (121)
Most wickets	Angeline Mare (4)	Rubina Chhetry (6)
- Player of the series: Rubina Chhetry (Nep)

The Nepal women's cricket team toured Qatar in November 2021 to play a three-match bilateral Twenty20 International (T20I) series. The venue for the series was the West End Park International Cricket Stadium in Doha. These matches provided part of Nepal's preparation for the 2021 ICC Women's T20 World Cup Asia Qualifier. Nepal won the first two matches, winning the series with a game to spare. Nepal won the final match by 109 runs to win the series 3–0.

== Squads ==
Qatar	Nepal
Aysha (c); Hiral Agarwal; Shahreen Bahadur; Sneha Chandnani; Saachi Dhadwal; Rizpha Bano Emmanuel (wk); Khadija Imtiaz; Trupti Kale; Aleena Khan; Angeline Mare; Sabeeja Panayan; Kerry Pounsett; Aisha Rahman; Shrutiben Rana; Reeva Shah	Rubina Chhetry (c); Indu Barma; Apsari Begam; Karuna Bhandari; Dolly Bhatta; Kabita Joshi; Saraswati Kumari; Kabita Kunwar; Sarita Magar; Sita Rana Magar; Jyoti Pandey; Sangita Rai; Sabnam Rai; Kajal Shrestha (wk)

== T20I series ==
=== 1st T20I ===
16 November 2021
13:00
Scorecard

Nepal; 146/4 (20 overs)	v	Qatar; 27 (11.5 overs)
Indu Barma 55* (47); Angeline Mare 1/18 (2 overs)		Angeline Mare 8 (13); Rubina Chhetry 3/1 (1.5 overs)

Nepal won by 119 runs
West End Park International Cricket Stadium, Doha
Umpires: Prassanna Haran (Qat) and Mohammad Nasim (Qat)
Player of the match: Indu Barma (Nep)

- Qatar won the toss and elected to field.
- Hiral Agarwal, Rizpha Bano Emmanuel, Sabeeja Panayan, Kerry Pounsett (Qat), Kabita Joshi and Sangita Rai (Nep) all made their WT20I debuts.

=== 2nd T20I ===
17 November 2021
13:00
Scorecard

Nepal; 129/6 (20 overs)	v	Qatar; 68 (19.3 overs)
Rubina Chhetry 50 (48); Angeline Mare 2/28 (4 overs)		Aysha 24 (32); Saraswati Kumari 4/8 (4 overs)

Nepal won by 61 runs
West End Park International Cricket Stadium, Doha
Umpires: Abdul Jabbar (Qat) and Riyaz Kurupkar (Qat)
Player of the match: Rubina Chhetry (Nep)

- Nepal won the toss and elected to bat.
- Jyoti Pandey and Sabnam Rai (Nep) both made their T20I debuts.

=== 3rd T20I ===
18 November 2021
13:00
Scorecard

Nepal; 164/3 (20 overs)	v	Qatar; 55/7 (20 overs)
Sita Rana Magar 82* (72); Aysha 1/24 (3 overs)		Aleena Khan 19 (33); Sabnam Rai 1/2 (3 overs)

Nepal won by 109 runs
West End Park International Cricket Stadium, Doha
Umpires: Abdul Jabbar (Qat) and Muhammad Usman (Qat)
Player of the match: Sita Rana Magar (Nep)

- Nepal won the toss and elected to bat.
- Shrutiben Rana and Reeva Shah (Qat) both made their T20I debuts.
