= Nepal women's cricket team in Malaysia in 2023 =

International cricket tour

	Malaysia	Nepal
- Dates: 29 May – 4 June 2023
Captains	Mas Elysa	Rubina Chhetry

Twenty20 International series
- Results: Nepal won the 5-match series 3–2
Most runs	Winifred Duraisingam (102)	Sita Rana Magar (83)
Most wickets	Nik Nur Atiela (6); Winifred Duraisingam (6); Aisya Eleesa (6)	Rubina Chhetry (5)
- Player of the series: Rubina Chhetry (Nep)

The Nepal women's national cricket team toured Malaysia in May and June 2023 to play five Twenty20 International (T20I) matches. All of the matches were played at the UKM-YSD Cricket Oval in Bangi. These were the first international matches for Nepal's women since the 2022 ACC Women's T20 Championship tournament in June 2022.

Nepal won the series 3–2.

== Squads ==
Malaysia	Nepal
Mas Elysa (c); Musfirah Nur Ainaa; Nik Nur Atiela; Christina Baret (wk); Winifred Duraisingam; Aisya Eleesa; Ainna Hamizah Hashim; Mahirah Izzati Ismail; Wan Julia (wk); Dhanusri Muhunan; Aina Najwa (wk); Nur Arianna Natsya; Amalin Sorfina; Suabika Manivannan; Nur Dania Syuhada	Rubina Chhetry (c); Indu Barma; Apsari Begam; Ishwori Bist; Kabita Joshi; Asmina Karmacharya; Samjhana Khadka; Saraswati Kumari; Kabita Kunwar; Sita Rana Magar; Kritika Marasini; Jyoti Pandey (wk); Bindu Rawal; Kajal Shrestha (wk)

== T20I series ==
=== 1st T20I ===
29 May 2023
11:00
Scorecard

Nepal; 50 (16.5 overs)	v	Malaysia; 51/5 (13.2 overs)
Samjhana Khadka 13 (25); Nik Nur Atiela 3/9 (4 overs)		Wan Julia 13 (22); Rubina Chhetry 2/7 (4 overs)

Malaysia won by 5 wickets
UKM-YSD Cricket Oval, Bangi
Umpires: Nur Hijrah (Mas) and Zaidan Taha (Mas)
Player of the match: Nik Nur Atiela (Mas)

- Malaysia won the toss and elected to field.
- Samjhana Khadka and Kritika Marasini (Nep) both made their T20I debuts.

=== 2nd T20I ===
30 May 2023
11:00
Scorecard

Malaysia; 97/5 (20 overs)	v	Nepal; 103/3 (17.3 overs)
Mas Elysa 28 (34); Rubina Chhetry 2/16 (4 overs)		Rubina Chhetry 29* (21); Nik Nur Atiela 1/13 (3 overs)

Nepal won by 7 wickets
UKM-YSD Cricket Oval, Bangi
Umpires: Nur Hijrah (Mas) and Denish Sevakumaran (Mas)
Player of the match: Rubina Chhetry (Nep)

- Malaysia won the toss and elected to bat.

=== 3rd T20I ===
1 June 2023
11:00
Scorecard

Nepal; 110/5 (20 overs)	v	Malaysia; 83/4 (20 overs)
Rubina Chhetry 27 (15); Nik Nur Atiela 2/23 (4 overs)		Mahirah Izzati Ismail 44* (54); Indu Barma 1/7 (3 overs)

Nepal won by 27 runs
UKM-YSD Cricket Oval, Bangi
Umpires: Izmir Azraf (Mas) and Rudy Ismandy (Mas)
Player of the match: Rubina Chhetry (Nep)

- Malaysia won the toss and elected to field.
- Ishwori Bist (Nep) made her T20I debut.

=== 4th T20I ===
3 June 2023
11:00
Scorecard

Nepal; 96/7 (20 overs)	v	Malaysia; 97/6 (20 overs)
Indu Barma 32 (31); Winifred Duraisingam 3/17 (4 overs)		Winifred Duraisingam 38 (52); Rubina Chhetry 1/13 (4 overs)

Malaysia won by 4 wickets
UKM-YSD Cricket Oval, Bangi
Umpires: Nur Hijrah (Mas) and Shafizan Shahriman (Mas)
Player of the match: Winifred Duraisingam (Mas)

- Nepal won the toss and elected to bat.

=== 5th T20I ===
4 June 2023
11:00
Scorecard

Malaysia; 109/5 (20 overs)	v	Nepal; 110/7 (19.2 overs)
Wan Julia 47 (60); Kabita Joshi 2/12 (4 overs)		Sita Rana Magar 34 (37); Ainna Hamizah Hashim 2/23 (4 overs)

Nepal won by 3 wickets
UKM-YSD Cricket Oval, Bangi
Umpires: Loganathan Poobalan (Mas) and Denish Sevakumaran (Mas)
Player of the match: Sita Rana Magar (Nep)

- Nepal won the toss and elected to field.
