= Aarati Bidari =

Nepalese cricketer (born 1992)

Personal information
- Born: 26 November 1992 (age 33)
- Batting: Right-handed
- Bowling: Legbreak
- Role: Bowler

International information
- National side: Nepal (2019-present)
- T20I debut (cap 14): January 19 2019 v Thailand
- Last T20I: 25 February 2019 v China

Career statistics
Competition	WT20I
Matches	2
Runs scored	0
Batting average	–
100s/50s	0/0
Top score	0*
Balls bowled	36
Wickets	0
Bowling average	–
5 wickets in innings	–
10 wickets in match	–
Best bowling	–
Catches/stumpings	0/–
- Source: Cricinfo, 27 February 2019

Aarati Bidari (Nepali: आरती बिदारी) is a Nepali legbreak bowler for Nepal women's national cricket team.

Aarati had debuted in the International match for Nepal in a T20I match against Thailand women's national cricket team on 19 January 2019. The match was the part of the 2019 ICC Women's Qualifier Asia in Bangkok, Thailand. It was a tournament which is an Asia region qualifier for the 2019 ICC Women's World Twenty20 Qualifier as well as the 2020 Women's Cricket World Cup Qualifier tournaments, with the top team progressing to both of them.
