= Fapla International Cricket Ground =

Cricket Ground in Nepal

- Interactive map of Fapla International Cricket Ground
- Location: Chatakpur, Dhangadhi, Kailali, Nepal
- Country: Nepal
- Coordinates: 28.7252°N 80.5610°E
- Establishment: 2014; 12 years ago
- Capacity: 50,000(Under construction))
- Owner: Government of Nepal
- Operator: Sudurpashchim Province Cricket Association
- Tenants: Sudurpashchim Province cricket team
- As of 11 February 2025; Source: ESPNcricinfo

Fapla International Cricket Ground (Nepali: फाप्ला अन्तर्राष्ट्रिय क्रिकेट मैदान) is located in Dhangadhi, Kailali, Nepal. It is two kilometres North of Chauraha on the bank of Mohana River in Boradadi lies Fapla with an area of 1369 sq. meter (31 Bigaha-incorporating the forest and school nearby). A small part of that is being used for the ground. Fapla International Cricket Ground is also the home ground of Sudurpaschim Royals, one of the eight teams of Nepal Premier League.

The New Fapla International Cricket Stadium in Nepal, featured in a 3D animation, will have a capacity of 50,000 spectators, making it the joint 10th biggest stadium in the world by seating capacity.

== History ==
Before Fapla, every cricket tournament in Dhangadhi was played in Dhangadi Rangashala. But the Rangashala was built into a football stadium for 6th national games. So cricket in Dhangadhi was shifted to Zonal Police Ground. Zonal Police Ground is in the heart of Dhangadhi] and although was easier for the spectators to come there and watch the game but the ground, being in police territory-the permission to host tournaments did not come easy.

It was those times, when the WCL-4 had just been won, and with Nepal's success in ACC tournaments that more people in Dhangadi got involved with cricket. Consequently, more tournaments were being hosted. Zonal Police being the only ground back then, it was often occupied.

Dhangadhi Cricket Academy, in its very first year of establishment, set eye on starting a cricket league. It faced the same problem as many cricket tournaments face in Dhanghadi-unavailability of cricket ground. Subash Shahi put forward an idea as developing Fapla as a cricket venue and, in the future could upgrade with facilities of international standard. Fapla was approved for the first edition of Dhangadi Cricket League.

“The condition of this place was miserable then” Shahi remembers the dusty ground in which first edition of DCA was played. “I saw a dream of international matches being played here and invested my personal money in its construction”, he explained. Right now Fapla is not just lusty green turf but also getting concrete parfaits for spectators.

== Description and prospects ==
The boundaries are mentioned 70 m long in the map but the ground being constructed for NPL has is around 60-65m boundaries.

Selector and Cricket expert Basu Dev Joshi points out that Nepal needs more grounds to raise Nepal's cricketing standard.

When completed Fapla will be the first cricket ground with turf wickets in Dhanghadi.

The cost of construction of Fapla Cricket Ground is estimated at 1 crore but when completed may give back a lot more. It has the potential to give Dhanghadi better chances at National Tournament. Also with better infrastructures Nepal might rise higher in ICC's Cricket development ranking. Fapla cricket ground will likely be completed in few days. Although the construction of a ground is important, what is more important once the construction is completed is its maintenance-if that is ensured Fapla will surely be a faith changer for Nepal cricket.

He is the organizer of the SPA Cup, President of Dhangadhi Cricket Academy (DCA), vice-president of Dhangadhi Cricket Association, and once opener for Region No.6 Baitadi. He wants to develop Dhangadhi as “Cricket Capital of Nepal” and is currently investing his time on building the Fapla Cricket Ground.

== Major sport events ==
- 2024–25 Prime Minister Cup (Women)
- Arjun Trophy National T20 Cricket Tournament
- 2019 Dhangadhi Premier League

== See also ==
- Mulpani International Cricket Ground
- Tribhuvan University International Cricket Ground
- Dang International Cricket Ground
