= Nary Thapa =

Nepalese cricketer (born 1992)

Personal information
- Full name: Nary Thapa
- Born: 3 June 1992 (age 34); Nepal
- Batting: Left-handed
- Bowling: Left-arm fast-medium
- Role: Bowler

International information
- National side: Nepal
- T20I debut (cap 7): 12 January 2019 v China
- Last T20I: 27 February 2019 v Kuwait

Career statistics
| Competition | WT20I |
|---|---|
| Matches | 11 |
| Runs scored | 63 |
| Batting average | 12.60 |
| 100s/50s | 0/0 |
| Top score | 19 |
| Balls bowled | 219 |
| Wickets | 17 |
| Bowling average | 7.17 |
| 5 wickets in innings | 1 |
| 10 wickets in match | 0 |
| Best bowling | 6/8 |
| Catches/stumpings | 3/– |
- Source: Cricinfo, 27 February 2019

Nary Thapa (Nepali: नेरी थापा) is a former Nepali cricketer, who is a left-handed batter. She was the first-ever captain of Nepal women's cricket team.

== International career ==
Thapa made her international debut in January-2019 against China at the Thailand Women's T20 Smash tournament. She also represented Nepal in the 2019 ICC Women's Qualifier Asia in Bangkok, Thailand. This tournament was an Asia region qualifier for the 2019 ICC Women's World Twenty20 Qualifier as well as the 2020 Women's Cricket World Cup Qualifier tournaments, with the top team progressing to both of them. During the tournament, she took her first five-wicket haul in WT20Is. She was the joint-leading wicket-taker in the 2019 ICC Women's Qualifier Asia tournament, with thirteen dismissals in six matches.

== Retirement ==
On 19 March 2024, Thapa announced her retirement from all forms of cricket through social media.
