= Ilenia Sims =

English cricketer

Personal information
- Full name: Ilenia Elisa Janet Sims
- Born: 10 February 2002 (age 24)
- Batting: Right-handed
- Bowling: Right-arm off break
- Role: Bowler

International information
- National side: Italy (2024–present)
- T20I debut (cap 25): 28 May 2024 v Netherlands
- Last T20I: 21 April 2026 v Vanuatu

Domestic team information
- Years: Team
- 2015–present: Staffordshire
- 2020: Lightning
- 2022: Lightning

Career statistics
Competition	WT20I	WLA	WT20
Matches	27	22	29
Runs scored	491	85	84
Batting average	32.73	9.44	12.00
100s/50s	0/2	0/0	0/0
Top score	61*	22*	32
Balls bowled	467	984	513
Wickets	33	25	32
Bowling average	12.93	22.84	14.09
5 wickets in innings	0	0	1
10 wickets in match	0	0	0
Best bowling	3/0	3/15	5/8
Catches/stumpings	2/–	9/–	4/–
- Source: CricketArchive, 21 April 2026

Ilenia Elisa Janet "Lenny" Sims (born 10 February 2002) is an English-Italian cricketer who currently plays for Staffordshire. She plays as a right-arm off break bowler. She has previously played for Lightning.

She made her international debut for Italy in May 2024.

== Early life ==
Sims was born on 10 February 2002. She studied at Loughborough University. Her great-great-uncle is former England cricketer Harold Larwood.

== Domestic career ==
Sims made her county debut in 2015, for Staffordshire against Derbyshire. 2018 was her most successful season for the side, as she took 8 wickets at an average of 13.37 in the County Championship, and was the joint-fourth leading wicket-taker across the whole Twenty20 Cup, with 14 wickets at an average of 9.64. This included her maiden county five-wicket haul, taking 5/8 in a Twenty20 against Cumbria. In 2019, Sims took 9 wickets in the County Championship at an average of 12.66, including her List A best bowling figures of 3/15. In 2021, Sims made her Twenty20 high score, hitting 32 opening the batting against Somerset. She took six wickets for Staffordshire in the 2022 Women's Twenty20 Cup, at an average of 23.33.

In 2020, Sims played for Lightning in the Rachael Heyhoe Flint Trophy. She appeared in one match, scoring 1* in a defeat to North West Thunder. After not being included in the Lightning squad in 2021, she returned to the side in 2022, but did not play a match.

== International career ==
In May 2024, Sims was named in the Italy squad for their tour of the Netherlands. She made her Twenty20 International debut in the first match of the series, taking 3/27 from her four overs.
