= Dolly Bhatta =

Nepalese cricketer (born 2002)

Personal information
- Full name: Dolly Bhatta
- Born: 11 January 2002 (age 24); Kanchanpur, Nepal
- Batting: Right handed
- Bowling: Right arm medium
- Role: Batter

International information
- National side: Nepal
- T20I debut (cap 3): 12 January 2019 v China
- Last T20I: 23 July 2024 v India

Career statistics
Competition	WT20I
Matches	21
Runs scored	91
Batting average	7.58
100s/50s	0/0
Top score	25
Catches/stumpings	2/–
Medal record
Representing Nepal
Women's Cricket
South Asian Games
Bronze medal – third place	2019 Kathmandu/Pokhara	Team
- Source: Cricinfo, 26 November 2022

Dolly Bhatta (Nepali: डोली भट्ट, born 11 January 2002, Kanchanpur, Nepal) is a Nepalese cricketer who plays for Nepal women's national cricket team.

== Playing career ==
She was named in Nepal women's national cricket team squads for 2019 Thailand Women's T20 Smash. On 12 January 2019, She made her Twenty20 International debut against China women's in the Thailand Women's T20 Smash. In February 2019, she was also named in Nepal's women squads for the tournament 2019 ICC Women's Qualifier Asia in Bangkok, Thailand.

In October 2021, she was named in Nepal's side for the 2021 ICC Women's T20 World Cup Asia Qualifier tournament in the United Arab Emirates.
