= Karuna Bhandari =

Nepali cricketer (born 1988)

Personal information
- Full name: Karuna Bhandari
- Born: 24 November 1988 (age 37); Nepal
- Batting: Right-handed
- Bowling: Right-arm off break
- Role: Bowler

International information
- National side: Nepal
- T20I debut (cap 3): 12 January 2019 v China
- Last T20I: 28 November 2021 v United Arab Emirates

Career statistics
Competition	WT20I
Matches	21
Runs scored	9
Batting average	2.25
100s/50s	0/0
Top score	4
Balls bowled	348
Wickets	17
Bowling average	12.00
5 wickets in innings	0
10 wickets in match	0
Best bowling	3/9
Catches/stumpings	6/–
Medal record
Representing Nepal
Women's Cricket
South Asian Games
Bronze medal – third place	2019 Kathmandu/Pokhara	Team
- Source: Cricinfo, 8 October 2024

Karuna Bhandari (Nepali: करुणा भण्डारी is a Nepali cricketer and a bowler of the Nepali National Cricket team. She bats right-handed and bowls right-arm off break.

== Background ==
Bhandari played in the 2014 Asian Games as a part of the Nepal women's national cricket team. She also played in the Women's T20 Qualifiers Asian Region. She was the "player of the match" in the match with Kuwait in the ACC Women's Twenty20 Championship, in which Nepal defeated and qualified for the semifinals.

In October 2021, she was named in Nepal's side for the 2021 ICC Women's T20 World Cup Asia Qualifier tournament in the United Arab Emirates.
