= Mamta Chaudhary =

Nepalese cricketer (born 1991)

Personal information
- Full name: Mamta Kumari Chaudhary
- Born: 27 September 1998 (age 28); Nepal
- Batting: Right-handed
- Role: Batter

International information
- National side: Nepal
- T20I debut (cap 12): 13 January 2019 v Malaysia
- Last T20I: 24 June 2022 v UAE
Medal record
Representing Nepal
Women's Cricket
South Asian Games
| Bronze medal – third place | 2019 Kathmandu/Pokhara | Team |
- Source: Cricinfo, 24 June 2022

Mamta Kumari Chaudhary (Nepali: ममता चौधरी) is a Nepali cricketer and Middle-order batswoman of Nepali National Cricket team. Her first time representing Nepal in an international level was in the ACC T20 Women's Tournament on 29 October 2012, playing against China. She has also played in the 2014 Asian Games and 2016 Women's Twenty20 Asia Cup as a part of the Nepal women's national cricket team.
