= Roma Thapa =

Nepali cricketer (born 1997)

Personal information
- Full name: Roma Thapa
- Born: 17 August 1997 (age 29); Nepal
- Batting: Right handed
- Role: Batter

International information
- National side: Nepal
- T20I debut (cap 10): 12 January 2019 v China
- Last T20I: 21 July 2024 v Pakistan
Medal record
Representing Nepal
Women's Cricket
South Asian Games
Bronze medal – third place	2019 Kathmandu/Pokhara	Team
- Source: Cricinfo, 8 October 2024

Roma Thapa (Nepali: रोमा थापा; born 17 August 1997) is a Nepalese cricketer who plays for the Nepal women's national cricket team.

== International career ==
She made her Twenty20 International debut against China women's in the Thailand Women's T20 Smash. She also represented Nepal in the 2019 ICC Women's Qualifier Asia in Bangkok, Thailand. This tournament was the part of Asia region qualifier for the 2019 ICC Women's World Twenty20 Qualifier as well as the 2020 Women's Cricket World Cup Qualifier tournaments, with the top team progressing to both of them.
