= Samjhana Khadka =

Nepali cricketer (born 1999)

Personal information
- Born: 11 September 1999 (age 27); Bajhang, Sudurpashchim, Nepal
- Batting: Right-handed
- Bowling: Legbreak Googly
- Role: Opening-Batter

International information
- National side: Nepal
- T20I debut (cap 26): 29 May 2023 v Malaysia
- Last T20I: 22 May 2026 v Malaysia

Domestic team information
- Years: Team
- 2019/20: Lalitpur Falcons
- 2020/21–present: Sudur Paschim Province

Career statistics
Competition	T20I
Matches	19
Runs scored	146
Batting average	13.27
100s/50s	0/1
Top score	72*
Catches/stumpings	2/–
- Source: CricInfo, 8 October 2024

Samjhana Khadka (born 11 September 1999) is a Nepali right-hand batter for the Nepal women's national cricket team.

== International career ==
In May 2023, she was named in Nepal's squad for the tour of Malaysia where she made her debut in international cricket.

On 19 July 2024, she scored an unbeaten 72 runs and played match-winning innings against United Arab Emirates in the 2024 Women's Twenty20 Asia Cup. She also became the first batter for Nepal women's national cricket team to score a half-century in the Women's Asia Cup.

== See also ==
- List of Nepal women Twenty20 International cricketers
