= Kabita Joshi =

Nepalese cricketer (born 1996)

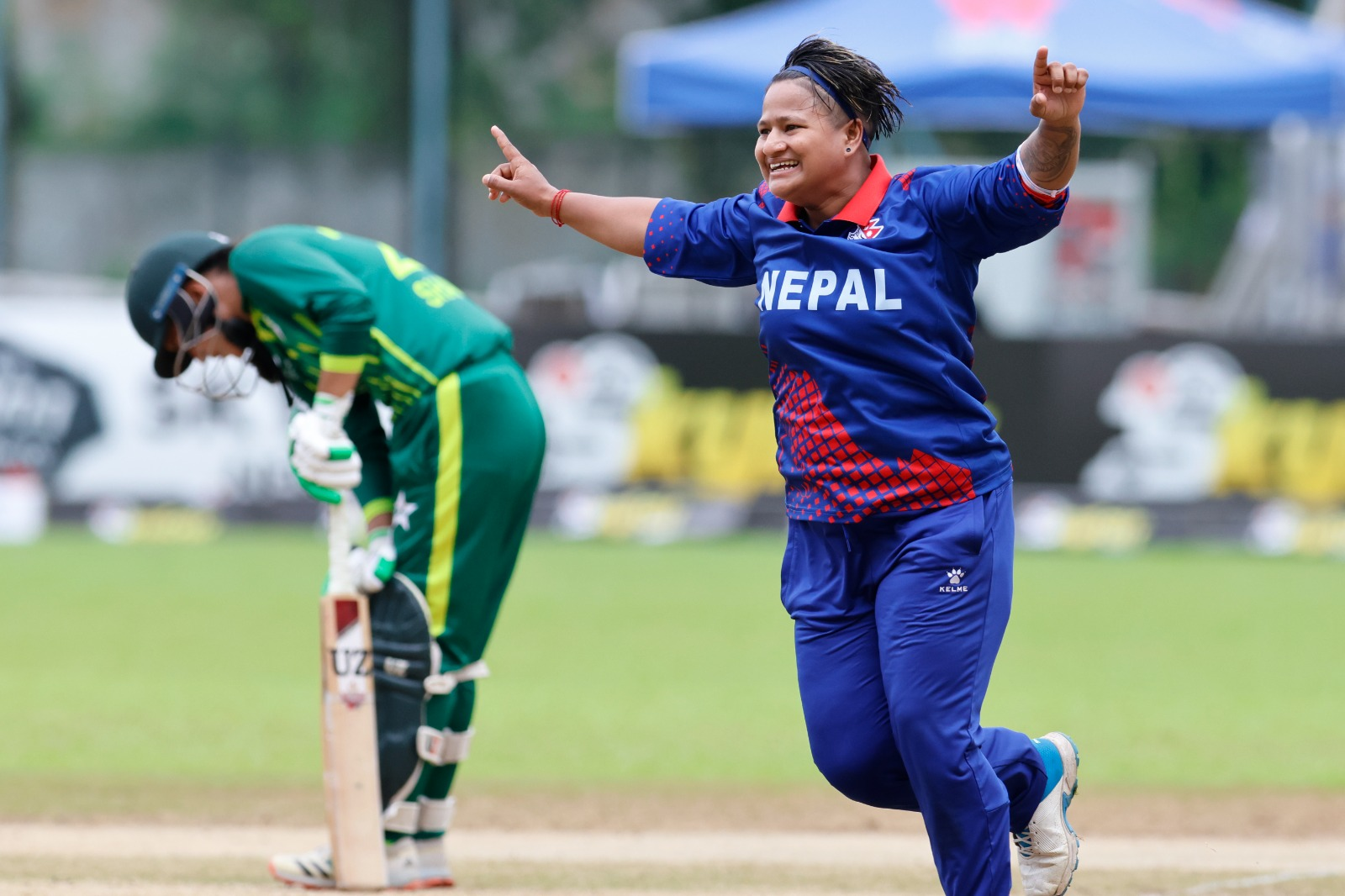

Personal information
- Full name: Kabita Joshi
- Born: 17 June 1996 (age 30); Tilkeni, Kanchanpur, Nepal
- Batting: Right handed
- Bowling: Right arm medium
- Role: Batter

International information
- National side: Nepal
- T20I debut (cap 19): 16 November 2021 v Qatar
- Last T20I: 23 July 2024 v India

Career statistics
Competition	WT20I
Matches	35
Runs scored	112
Batting average	10.18
100s/50s	0/0
Top score	18*
Balls bowled	337
Wickets	15
Bowling average	17.93
5 wickets in innings	0
10 wickets in match	0
Best bowling	2/5
Catches/stumpings	7/–
- Source: Cricinfo, 8 October 2024

Kabita Joshi (Nepali: कविता जोशी, born 17 June 1996, Tilkeni, Kanchanpur, Nepal) is a Nepalese cricketer who plays for Nepal women's national cricket team.

== International career ==
In October 2021, she was named in Nepal's side for the 2021 ICC Women's T20 World Cup Asia Qualifier tournament in the United Arab Emirates. On 16 November 2021, She made her T20I debut against Qatar in the Nepal women's tour of Qatar.
