= Kabita Kunwar =

Nepali cricketer (born 2003)

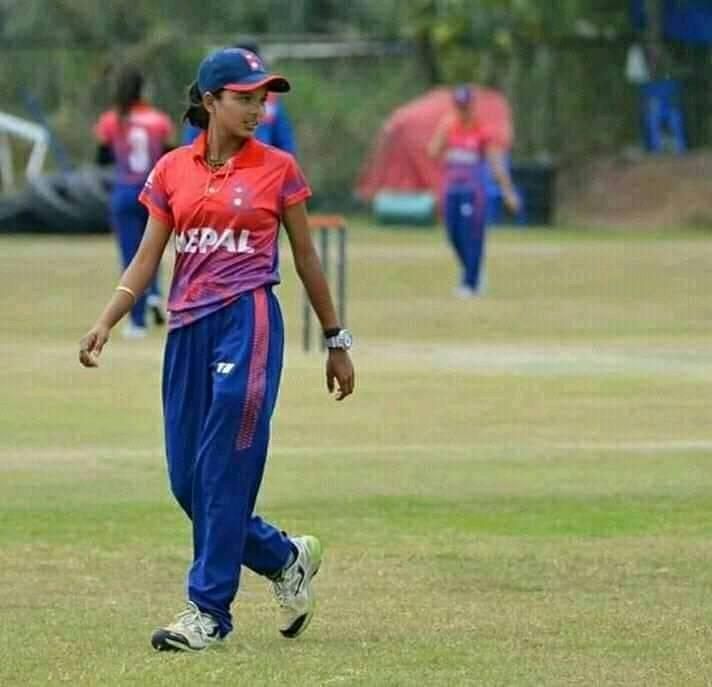

Personal information
- Full name: Kabita Kunwar
- Born: 31 July 2003 (age 23)
- Batting: Right-handed
- Bowling: Right-arm medium
- Role: Bowler

International information
- National side: Nepal
- T20I debut (cap 4): 12 January 2019 v China
- Last T20I: 30 April 2026 v Vanuatu

Career statistics
Competition	WT20I
Matches	72
Runs scored	406
Batting average	9.90
100s/50s	0/0
Top score	31
Balls bowled	1263
Wickets	71
Bowling average	12.16
5 wickets in innings	0
10 wickets in match	0
Best bowling	6/5
Catches/stumpings	17/–
Medal record
Representing Nepal
Women's Cricket
South Asian Games
Bronze medal – third place	2019 Kathmandu/Pokhara	Team
- Source: ESPNcricinfo, 30 April 2026

Kabita Kunwar (Nepali: कविता कुँवर) (born 31 July 2003) is a Nepali cricketer and right arm-medium bowler for the Nepal women's national cricket team.

== International career ==
Kajal was in the playing 11 of the Nepal women first twenty 20 International debut match against China women's national cricket team. She also represented Nepal in the 2019 ICC Women's Qualifier Asia in Bangkok, Thailand. This is a tournament which is an Asia region qualifier for the 2019 ICC Women's World Twenty20 Qualifier as well as the 2020 Women's Cricket World Cup Qualifier tournaments, with the top team progressing to both of them.

In October 2021, she was named in Nepal's side for the 2021 ICC Women's T20 World Cup Asia Qualifier tournament in the United Arab Emirates.
