= Nepal women's national cricket team =

Cricket team

Nepal
- Nickname(s): Cheli (चेलीहरु), Lady Rhinos
- Association: Cricket Association of Nepal

Personnel
- Captain: Indu Barma
- Vice-captain: Puja Mahato
- Coach: Harshal Pathak
- Manager: Ambika Budhathoki

Team information
- Home ground: Pokhara International Cricket Stadium, Pokhara
- Capacity: 18,500

International Cricket Council
- ICC status: Associate member (1996); Affiliate member (1988)
- ICC region: Asia
ICC Rankings	Current	Best-ever
T20I	21st	14th (27 Feb 2019)

International cricket
- First international: v. Thailand at Johor; 12 July 2007

T20 Internationals
- First T20I: v. China at Asian Institute of Technology Ground, Bangkok; 12 January 2019
- Last T20I: v. Thailand at Bayuemas Oval, Pandamaran; 10 June 2026
T20Is	Played	Won/Lost
Total	102	59/42 (0 ties, 1 no result)
This year	22	12/10 (0 ties, 0 no results)
T20I kit
- As of 10 June 2026

Nepal national cricket teams
Women's	Men's	Men's A	Women's U19	Men's U19	Blind Men's

The Nepal women's national cricket team (Nepali: नेपाल महिला राष्ट्रिय क्रिकेट टोली) represents Nepal in international women's cricket. They made their international debut in the ACC Women's Tournament in Malaysia in July 2007. Nepal has been participating in various international tournaments since then.

Harshal Pathak serves as the head coach of the team whereas Indu Barma captains the team in all formats. Puja Mahato serves as the vice-captain of the team.

In April 2018, the International Cricket Council (ICC) granted full Women's Twenty20 International (WT20I) status to all its members. Therefore, all Twenty20 matches played between Nepal women and another international side after 1 July 2018 will be a full WT20I. Nepal made their Twenty20 International debut on 12 January 2019 against China, at the 2019 Thailand Women's T20 Smash in Bangkok. Nepal finished runner-up at the tournament losing to Thailand by 70 runs in the Final.

== Overview ==
Women's cricket is thriving and the national team (made up of top athletes from other sports) did very well to reach the final of the 2007 ACC Women's Tournament. Nepal won the 2008 ACC Under-19 Women's Championship and defended its title in 2010.

In the ACC Women Twenty20 in Malaysia in 2009, Singapore needed two runs off the last over for victory with five wickets intact. Rubina Chhetry was given the 'hopeless' over but she did a miracle by taking five wickets in five balls as the match ended in a draw as she threw a wide. Nepal won the match in bowl-out. With the rare incident, Rubina also became the first Nepalese cricketer, men or women, to take a hat-trick. "I have never heard that any team has won the match taking five wickets in the last over, this is very, very rare," the then captain Binod Das commented.

On 26 April 2018, ICC announced that all the T20 matches played between ICC members will be awarded T20I status starting from 1 July 2018 for women's cricket, as a result Nepal played their first T20I match against China on 12 January 2019.

In December 2020, the ICC announced the qualification pathway for the 2023 ICC Women's T20 World Cup. Nepal were named in the 2021 ICC Women's T20 World Cup Asia Qualifier regional group, alongside seven other teams.

At the 2022 ACC Women's T20 Championship, Nepal reached the semifinals before being eliminated, losing to the UAE not on the field, but rather on a lower net-run-rate than the latter, due to a rain-out.

In late May to early June 2023, the Nepal women returned to action for the first time since 2022, with a 5-match T20 series against Malaysia, winning 3–2. Later in June 2023, it was announced that Nepal would replace Thailand at the 2023 ACC Women's T20 Emerging Teams Asia Cup, due to reported visa issues with the latter team. This was announced on short notice, as the announcement was made on the 8th, and their first match would be on the 13th of the month. Ultimately, they would only get to play one match against Pakistan A, losing 87–78, with their other scheduled matches against India A and Hong Kong rained out.

=== 2024—present ===
24 January 2026
13:00
Scorecard

Zimbabwe; 129/6 (20 overs)	v	Nepal; 133/4 (19.3 overs)
Kelis Ndhlovu 52* (36); Riya Sharma 2/25 (4 overs)		Puja Mahato 52* (50); Josephine Nkomo 2/28 (3.3 overs)

Nepal won by 6 wickets
Tribhuvan University International Cricket Ground, Kirtipur
Umpires: Jonathan Kennedy (Ire) and Kerrin Klaaste (SA)
Player of the match: Puja Mahato (Nep)

- Nepal won the toss and elected to field.
- Sita Rana Magar (Nep) completed 1000 runs in her T20I career.

== Current squad ==
The following players, highlighted in bold, were selected in the squads for the Women's Qualifier at the 2026 Asian Games.

As of 25 May 2026

Key

Symbol	Meaning
CG	Contract grade with CAN
No.	Shirt number of the player in all formats

No.	Name	Date of birth	Batting style	Bowling style	Domestic team	CG	Notes
Batters
5	**Bindu Rawal**	11 June 1996 (age 30)	Left-handed	—N/a	Sudurpashchim Province	C	—N/a
6	**Samjhana Khadka**	11 September 1999 (age 27)	Right-handed	Right-arm leg spin	Sudurpashchim Province	B	—N/a
	Sabitri Dhami	17 April 2008 (age 18)	Right-handed	Right-arm medium	Sudurpashchim Province	D	—N/a
	Sana Praveen	22 February 2007 (age 19)	Right-handed	—N/a	Madhesh Province	D	—N/a
All-rounders
1	**Indu Barma**	29 September 1997 (age 29)	Right-handed	Right-arm medium	Nepal A.P.F. Club	A	Captain
2	**Puja Mahato**	17 February 2006 (age 20)	Right-handed	Right-arm medium	Madhesh Province	A	Vice captain
3	**Rubina Chhetry**	26 November 1993 (age 32)	Right-handed	Right-arm off break	Koshi Province	A	—N/a
8	**Sita Rana Magar**	5 March 1992 (age 34)	Left-handed	Slow left-arm orthodox	Nepal A.P.F. Club	A	—N/a
12	Suman Bist	23 November 1999 (age 26)	Right-handed	Left-arm medium	Nepal A.P.F. Club	D	—N/a
	**Seemana KC**	25 September 2006 (age 20)	Right-handed	Right-arm medium	Gandaki Province	D	—N/a
Wicket-keepers
	**Rubi Podda**		Right-handed	—N/a		C	—N/a
63	Roma Thapa	17 August 1997 (age 29)	Right-handed	—N/a	Nepal A.P.F. Club	D	—N/a
Fast Bowlers
88	**Kabita Kunwar**	31 July 2003 (age 23)	Right-handed	Right-arm medium	Sudurpashchim Province	B	—N/a
15	**Manisha Upadhayay**	15 February 2004 (age 22)	Left-handed	Left-arm medium	Bagmati Province	B	—N/a
	Ishwori Bist	27 February 2002 (age 24)	Right-handed	Left-arm medium	Tribhuvan Army	D	—N/a
Spin Bowlers
35	**Kabita Joshi**	17 June 1996 (age 30)	Right-handed	Right-arm off break	Sudurpashchim Province	C	—N/a
13	**Riya Sharma**	7 June 2007 (age 19)	Right-handed	Right-arm leg break	Koshi Province	C	—N/a
	Rachana Chaudhary	5 October 2007 (age 19)	Right-handed	Left-arm orthodox	Gandaki Province	D	—N/a

=== Pay grade ===
As of 25 May 2026

CAN awards central contracts to its players, their pay is graded according to the importance of the player. Players' Monthly salaries are as follows:

- Grade A – रु. 55,000
- Grade B – रु. 40,000
- Grade C – रु. 35,000
- Grade D – रु. 25,000

Match fees

Players also receive a match fee of Rs 5,000 per T20I match.

== Coaching staff ==
Position	Name
Manager	(Nepal) Amrita Paudel
Head coach	(India) Harshal Pathak
Assistant coach	(Nepal) Nira Rajopadhyay
Physiotherapist	(Nepal) Sakuna Dani
Consultant Coach	(India) Manish Jha
Fitness Trainer	(India) Monika

== Tournament History ==
Key
Champions
Runners-up
3rd position
Host

=== ICC Women's World T20 ===
Twenty20 World Cup records
Host Year	Round	Position	GP	W	L	T	NR
(England) 2009	Not able to qualify for global qualifier						
(Cricket West Indies) 2010	Not able to qualify for global qualifier						
(Sri Lanka) 2012	Not able to qualify for global qualifier						
(Bangladesh) 2014	Not able to qualify for global qualifier						
(India) 2016	Not able to qualify for global qualifier						
(Cricket West Indies) 2018	Not able to qualify for global qualifier						
(Australia) 2020	Not able to qualify for global qualifier						
(South Africa) 2023	Not able to qualify for global qualifier						
(United Arab Emirates) 2024	Not able to qualify for global qualifier						
(England) 2026	Didnot Qualified						
(Pakistan) 2028	To be determined						
Total	–	0 Titles	0	0	0	0	0

=== ICC Women's Qualifiers T20 ===
Twenty20 World Cup Qualifiers records								T20 Asia Qualifier record							
Host Year	Round	Pos	Pld	W	L	T	NR	Host Year	Round	Pos	Pld	W	L	T	NR
(Republic of Ireland) 2013	Did not qualify							Did not enter							
(Thailand) 2015	Did not qualify							Did not enter							
(Netherlands) 2018	Did not qualify							(Thailand) 2017	Semi Final	3rd	5	3	2	0	0
(Scotland) 2019	Did not qualify							(Thailand) 2019	Round Robin	2/7	6	5	1	0	0
(United Arab Emirates) 2022	Did not qualify							(United Arab Emirates) 2021	Round Robin	3/6	5	3	2	0	0
(United Arab Emirates) 2024	Did not qualify							(Malaysia) 2023	Semi Final	3/11	6	4	1	0	1
(Nepal) 2026	Group Stage	8/10	4	1	3	0	0	(Thailand) 2025	Runners-up	2/9	6	3	2	0	1
Total	1/7	0 Titles	4	1	3	0	0	Total	6/6	0 Titles	23	15	7	0	1

=== ODI World Cup ===
ODI World Cup records								Cricket World Cup Qualifier records							
Host Year	Round	Pos	Pld	W	L	T	NR	Host Year	Round	Pos	Pld	W	L	T	NR
(England) 1973	Did not qualify							Did not enter							
(India) 1978	Did not qualify							Did not enter							
(New Zealand) 1982	Did not qualify							Did not enter							
(Australia) 1988	Did not qualify							Did not enter							
(England) 1993	Did not qualify							Did not enter							
(India) 1997	Did not qualify							Did not enter							
(New Zealand) 2000	Did not qualify							Did not enter							
(South Africa) 2005	Did not qualify							(Netherlands) 2003	Did not qualify						
(Australia) 2009	Did not qualify							(South Africa) 2008	Did not qualify						
(India) 2013	Did not qualify							(Bangladesh) 2011	Did not qualify						
(England) 2017	Did not qualify							(Sri Lanka) 2017	Did not qualify						
(New Zealand) 2022	Did not qualify							(Zimbabwe) 2021	Did not qualify						
(India) (Sri Lanka) 2025	Did not qualify							(Pakistan) 2025	Did not qualify						
Total	0/12	0 Titles	0	0	0	0	0	Total	0/6	0 Title	0	0	0	0	0

=== ICC Women's T20 Champions Trophy ===
ICC Women's T20 Champions Trophy records
Host Year	Round	Position	GP	W	L	T	NR
(Sri Lanka) 2027	To be determined						
2031	To be determined						
Total	–	0 Title	0	0	0	0	0

=== Asia Cup ===
Year Host	Round	Position	GP	W	L	T	NR
2004 (Sri Lanka)	did not enter (ODI format)						
2005-06 (Pakistan)	did not enter (ODI format)						
2006 (India)	did not enter (ODI format)						
2008 (Sri Lanka)	did not enter (ODI format)						
2012 (China)	Group stage	7/8	3	0	3	0	0
2016 (Thailand)	Group stage	6/8	5	0	5	0	0
2018 (Malaysia)	did not qualify (T20I format)						
2022 (Bangladesh)	did not qualify (T20I format)						
2024 (Sri Lanka)	Group Stage	6/8	3	1	2	0	0
2026 (N/A)							
2028 (N/A)							
Total	3/9	0 Titles	11	1	2	0	0

=== ACC Women's Premier Cup ===
ACC Women's Premier Cup Record
Year Host	Round	Position	GP	W	L	T	NR
2024 (Malaysia)	Semi-finals	3/16	5	4	1	0	0
2026 (Malaysia)							
Total	1/1	0 Titles	5	4	1	0	0

=== Women‘s Asia Cup Rising Stars ===
Women's Asia Cup Rising Stars Record
Year Host	Round	Position	GP	W	L	T	NR
2023 (Hong Kong)	Group Stage	6/8	3	0	1	0	2
2026 (Thailand)	Group Stage	7/8	3	0	3	0	0

=== ACC Women's Tournament ===
Year Host	Round	Position	GP	W	L	T	NR
ACC Women's Tournament
2007 (Malaysia)	Runners-Up	2/8	5	4	1	0	0
ACC Women's Twenty20 Championship
2009 (Malaysia)	Semi-finals	3/12	7	5	2	0	0
2011 (Kuwait)	Semi-finals	4/10	6	4	2	0	0
ACC Women's Championship
2013 (Thailand)	Semi-finals	3/11	6	5	1	0	0
ACC Women's Premier
2014 (Thailand)	Group Stage	4/6	5	2	3	0	0
Total	Runners-up	5/5	29	20	9	0	0

=== Asian Games ===
Year Host	Round	Position	GP	W	L	T	NR
2010 (China)	First Round	5/8	3	1	2	0	0
2014 (South Korea)	Quarter-finals	5/10	3	1	2	0	0
2022 (China)	Didnot Participate						
2026 (Japan)	Didn't qualify						
Total	Quarter-finals	2/2	6	2	4	0	0

=== South Asian Games ===
Year Host	Round	Position	GP	W	L	T	NR
2019 (Nepal)	Third Place	3/4	4	2	2	0	0
2027 (Pakistan)

== Honours ==
=== Others ===
- South Asian Games
  - Bronze Medal (1): 2019

== Records and statistics ==
International Match Summary — Nepal Women

Last updated 10 June 2026

Playing Record
Format	M	W	L	T	NR	Inaugural Match
Twenty20 International	102	59	42	0	1	12 January 2019

=== Twenty20 International ===
- Highest team total: 227/4 v. Maldives on 13 February 2024 at UKM-YSD Cricket Oval, Bangi.
- Highest individual score: 118*, Rubina Chhetri v Maldives on 13 February 2024 at UKM-YSD Cricket Oval, Bangi.
- Best innings bowling: 6/0, Anjali Chand v Maldives, 2 December 2019 at Pokhara Rangasala, Pokhara.

Most T20I runs for Nepal Women

Player	Runs	Average	Career span
Indu Barma	1,322	18.61	2019–2026
Rubina Chhetry	1,100	18.64	2019–2026
Sita Rana Magar	1,078	20.73	2019–2026
Puja Mahato	859	17.18	2023–2026
Samjhana Khadka	728	14.00	2023–2026

Most T20I wickets for Nepal Women

Player	Wickets	Average	Career span
Kabita Kunwar	79	12.93	2019–2026
Rubina Chhetry	67	16.17	2019–2026
Sita Rana Magar	66	15.87	2019–2026
Puja Mahato	42	18.11	2023–2026
Indu Barma	41	15.51	2019–2026

T20I record versus other nations

Records complete to WT20I #2836. Last updated 10 June 2026.

Opponent	M	W	L	T	NR	First match	First win
ICC Full members
Bangladesh	1	0	1	0	0	5 December 2019	
India	1	0	1	0	0	23 July 2024	
Pakistan	1	0	1	0	0	21 July 2024	
Zimbabwe	1	1	0	0	0	24 January 2026	24 January 2026
ICC Associate members
Bahrain	4	4	0	0	0	20 June 2022	20 June 2022
Bhutan	5	5	0	0	0	23 November 2021	23 November 2021
China	4	3	1	0	0	12 January 2019	12 January 2019
Hong Kong	11	5	6	0	0	24 February 2019	24 February 2019
Indonesia	2	2	0	0	0	18 January 2019	18 January 2019
Italy	2	2	0	0	0	19 April 2026	19 April 2026
Japan	2	2	0	0	0	18 November 2023	18 November 2023
Kuwait	5	5	0	0	0	27 February 2019	27 February 2019
Malaysia	19	12	7	0	0	13 January 2019	13 January 2019
Maldives	3	3	0	0	0	2 December 2019	2 December 2019
Namibia	2	0	2	0	0	8 March 2025	
Netherlands	4	0	4	0	0	30 January 2025	
Qatar	5	5	0	0	0	16 November 2021	16 November 2021
Rwanda	2	2	0	0	0	22 April 2026	22 April 2026
Scotland	1	0	1	0	0	26 January 2026	
Tanzania	1	0	1	0	0	15 November 2023	
Thailand	9	0	9	0	0	19 January 2019	
Uganda	7	3	4	0	0	16 May 2022	20 May 2022
United Arab Emirates	6	4	1	0	1	14 January 2019	14 January 2019
United States	2	0	2	0	0	18 April 2026	
Vanuatu	2	1	1	0	0	24 April 2026	30 April 2026

== See also ==
- List of Nepal women Twenty20 International cricketers
- Nepal women's national under-19 cricket team
- Nepal national men's cricket team
