= 2026 ACC Women's Premier Cup =

International associate Twenty20 cricket tournament

- Tournament logo
- Dates: 3 – 13 June 2026
- Administrator: Asian Cricket Council
- Cricket format: Women's Twenty20 International
- Tournament format(s): Group stage and knockout stage
- Host: Malaysia
- Champions: Thailand (1st title)
- Runners-up: United Arab Emirates
- Participants: 18
- Matches: 40
- Most runs: (United Arab Emirates) Esha Oza (277)
- Most wickets: (Thailand) Thipatcha Putthawong (16)

The 2026 ACC Women's Premier Cup was the second edition of the ACC Women's Premier Cup, hosted by Malaysian Cricket Association from 3 to 13 June 2026. Eighteen associate teams competed in 40 matches across four venues in Malaysia. The defending champions, the United Arab Emirates were defeated in the final by Thailand. The top four teams of the tournament: Thailand, the United Arab Emirates, Indonesia and Hong Kong qualified for the 2026 Women's Twenty20 Asia Cup.

== Background ==
The ACC Women's Premier Cup is a biennial international cricket competition in Women's Twenty20 International (WT20I) format, organised by the Asian Cricket Council (ACC). It was inaugurated in 2024. The competition is played by the associate members of the ACC to determine qualification for the Women's Twenty20 Asia Cup. The United Arab Emirates were the defending champions.

=== Format ===
The 18 participating teams were divided into four groups: two groups of five teams and two groups of four teams. In the group stage, each team played each of the other teams in the group once in a round-robin format, and the top two teams in each group advanced to the knockout stage. The knockout stage consisted of four quarter-finals, two semi-finals, a third-place play-off and a final.

=== Venues ===
Tournament venues in Malaysia

The tournament was played across 4 venues in Malaysia: 12 matches at UKM-YSD Cricket Oval in Bangi (including quarter-finals 2 and 4), 6 matches each at Selangor Turf Club in Kuala Lumpur and Kolej Tuanku Jaafar Cricket Oval in Mantin and 16 matches at Bayuemas Oval in Pandamaran (including quarter-finals 1 and 3, both semi-finals, 3rd place play-off and final).

== Squads ==
Following squads were announced for the tournament:

- Bahrain: Sana Butt (wk), Sweeta Corda, Reshel D'Souza, Tharanga Gajanayake, Ashwini Govinda (wk), Disna Jayasooriya, Manmeet Kaur, Nipuni Nadeera, Reema Naseer, Saee Parekh, Deepika Rasangika (c), Sara Vivek, Abeera Waris, Shruti Yadav
- Bhutan: Ngawang Choden (wk), Ritshi Choden, Sonam Choden, Tshering Choki Choden, Anju Gurung (c), Samjana Mongar, Chado Om, Sonam Palden, Riya Pradhan, Mamta Rai, Sonam, Dechen Wangmo, Sangay Yangzom, Tshering Zangmo
- China: Cai Yuzhi, Chen Xinyu, Feng Qian, Gong Yuting, Hong Yali, Jiang Chuquin (wk), Jiaping Li, Lyu Yihan, Ma Ruike, Mingyue Zhu (c), Wang Huiying, Wei Haiting, Xie Wenyan, Zhao Yihan
- Hong Kong: Maryam Bibi, Charlotte Chan, Kary Chan, Shing Chan, Yasmin Daswani (wk), Mariko Hill, Joyleen Kaur, Emma Lai, Marina Lamplough, Natasha Miles (c), Iqra Sahar, Shanzeen Shahzad (wk), Alison Siu, Ruchitha Venkatesh
- Indonesia: Ni Ariani, Derni Bangi, Ni Luh Dewi, Kisi Kasse, Sang Maypriani, Rahmawati Pangestuti, Dara Paramitha, Ni Kadek Fitria Rada Rani, Ni Putu Ayu Nanda Sakarini (c, wk), Ni Made Putri Suwandewi, Desi Wulandari
- Japan: Ahilya Chandel, Ayumi Fujikawa, Hinase Goto, Haruna Iwasaki, Shimako Kato, Ayaka Kato-Stafford, Elena Kusuda-Nairn, Erika Oda, Kurumi Ota, Bianca Shino-Dyson (wk), Seika Sumi, Mamta Kaswan, Mai Yanagida (c), Nonoha Yasumoto
- Kuwait: Suchitha D'Sa (wk), Venora D'Souza, Candice Dias, Siobhan Gomez, Mariamma Hyder, Maria Jasvi, Zeefa Jilani, Khadija Khalil (wk), Priyada Murali, Maryam Omar, Balasubramani Shanti, Amna Tariq (c), Tshering Yangchen, Rida Zainab
- Malaysia: Winifred Duraisingam, Aisya Eleesa, Mas Elysa (c), Ainna Hamizah Hashim, Elsa Hunter, Nurin Imanina, Mahirah Izzati Ismail, Wan Julia (wk), Dhanusri Muhunan, Irdina Beh Nabil, Aina Najwa (wk), Nur Arianna Natsya, Nur Qalysha, Nur Dania Syuhada
- Mongolia: Oyunsuvd Amarjargal, Gansuk Anujin (c), Myagmarzaya Batnasan, Uugansuvd Bayarjavkhlan, Damdinsuren Enkhtsetseg, Nomin-Erdene Erdenebat, Batjargal Ichinkhorloo, Enkhbold Khaliunaa (wk), Sunjidmaa Phillips, Javzandulam Tugsjargal, Battur Unenchtseceg, Ganbold Urjindulam
- Myanmar: Htet Aung, Thae Thae Aung (wk), Zon Lin, Khin Myat, Wa Thone Nadi, Aye Phyo, Moe Ei Phyu, Pan Ei Phyu, May San, Thiri Sandar Shwe, Theint Soe (c), Lin Lin Tun, Shwe Yee Win, Zar Win (wk)
- Nepal: Indu Barma (c), Rubina Chhetry, Kabita Joshi, Anu Kadayat, Seemana KC, Samjhana Khadka, Kabita Kunwar, Puja Mahato, Sony Pakhrin, Rubi Poddar (wk), Sita Rana Magar, Bindu Rawal, Riya Sharma, Manisha Upadhayay
- Oman: Afida Afthab, Amanda Dcosta, Jayadhanyha Gunasekar, Javed Hina, Fiza Javed, Sahana Jeelany, Nitya Joshi, Sameera Khan, Lujaina, Priyanka Mendonca (c), Trupti Pawde, Cynthia Saldanha (wk), Sushanthika Sathiya, Alifiya Sayed
- Philippines: Jhon Andreano, Ma Luz Barcelona, Reyven Castillo, Katie Donovan (c), Maritoni Gatchalian, Mericris Hindoy, Karri Keen, Kyte Keen, Jomae Masaya, Jessica Medianesta (wk), Simran Sirah, Amelia Valdez, Elyza Wall, Zoe Milag Wong
- Qatar: Aysha Abdur Rahman (c), Lihara Ayeysekara, Shahreen Bahadur, Gertrude Candiru, Taful Elkhair, Khadija Imtiaz, Maria Jacob, Jaza Mariyam, Fatima Mukadam, Sargam Patel, Shrutiben Rana (wk), Krisheta Sarvanakumar (wk), Roshni Sebastian, Pavithra Selvam
- Saudi Arabia: Mah Noor Aamir, Najwa Akram, Maheen Amir, Laiba Arif, Rizwana Begum, Nimra Ghazanfar (wk), Ashmal Hashmi, Usra Umar Farooq, Afshan Khan, Abeer Maryam, Laiba Nasrullah, Mah Noor, Sara, Masahel Waqas (c)
- Singapore: Ananyah Ahuja, Rashmeka Badri Narayanan, Riyaa Bhasin (wk), Laasya Bommareddy, Haresh Dhavina, Devika Galia, Piumi Gurusinghe (wk), Vinu Kumar, Shafina Mahesh (c, wk), Pushpa Murali, Roma Raval, Roshni Seth, Anushka Tomar, Ella Ungerman
- Thailand: Nannaphat Chaihan, Naruemol Chaiwai (c), Natthakan Chantham, Sunida Chaturongrattana, Onnicha Kamchomphu, Nannapat Koncharoenkai (wk), Suleeporn Laomi, Phannita Maya, Chayanisa Phengpaen, Thipatcha Putthawong, Arrikan Phuengkho, Chanida Sutthiruang, Aphisara Suwanchonrathi, Koranit Suwanchonrathi
- United Arab Emirates: Samaira Dharnidharka, Heena Hotchandani, Al Maseera Jahangir, Lavanya Keny, Suraksha Kotte, Mehul Kulkarni, Vaishnave Mahesh, Indhuja Nandakumar, Esha Oza (c), Theertha Satish (wk), Simran Sheth, Shashikala Silva, Janani Thirukkumaran, Katie Thompson

== Group stage ==
In the group stage, two groups of five teams and two groups of four teams played in a round-robin format for a total of 32 matches from 3 to 9 June 2026 across four venues. The top two teams from each group: Thailand and Japan from group A, the United Arab Emirates and Oman from group B, Indonesia and Malaysia from group C and Hong Kong and Nepal from group D advanced to the knockout stage.

Group A	Group B	Group C	Group D
Bahrain; Japan; Mongolia; Myanmar; Thailand	China; Oman; Philippines; Saudi Arabia; United Arab Emirates	Indonesia; Kuwait; Malaysia; Singapore	Bhutan; Hong Kong; Nepal; Qatar

=== Group A ===
Group A standings
Pos	Team	Pld	W	L	NR	Pts	NRR	Qualification
1	Thailand	4	4	0	0	8	5.348	Advanced to the knockout stage
2	Japan	4	3	1	0	6	1.675	Advanced to the knockout stage
3	Myanmar	4	2	2	0	4	0.874	Eliminated
4	Mongolia	4	1	3	0	2	−3.968	Eliminated
5	Bahrain	4	0	4	0	0	−3.141	Eliminated

Source: ESPNcricinfo

Match 3
3 June 2026
09:30 UTC+8
Scorecard

Mongolia; 19 (9.2 overs)	v	Thailand; 21/0 (2.2 overs)
Anujin Gansukh 6 (5); Thipatcha Putthawong 5/3 (4 overs)		Phannita Maya 19* (10)

Thailand won by 10 wickets
Selangor Turf Club, Kuala Lumpur
Umpires: Humaira Farah (Pak) and Ankita Guha (Ind)
Player of the match: Thipatcha Putthawong (Tha)

- Mongolia won the toss and elected to bat.
- Sunjidmaa Phillips (Mgl) made her T20I debut.
- Thipatcha Putthawong (Tha) took her maiden hat-trick and her 150th wicket in WT20Is.

Match 5
3 June 2026
14:00 UTC+8
Scorecard

Bahrain; 64 (19.5 overs)	v	Myanmar; 65/2 (12.4 overs)
Deepika Rasangika 19 (34); Lin Lin Tun 3/10 (4 overs)		Theint Soe 23 (18); Deepika Rasangika 1/4 (0.4 overs)

Myanmar won by 8 wickets
Bayuemas Oval, Pandamaran
Umpires: Dedunu Silva (SL) and Venkatesan Krithika (Ind)
Player of the match: Lin Lin Tun (Mya)

- Bahrain won the toss and elected to bat.

Match 10
4 June 2026
09:30 UTC+8
Scorecard

Bahrain; 40 (13.4 overs)	v	Thailand; 41/0 (3.3 overs)
Tharanga Gajanayke 16 (14); Sunida Chaturongrattana 3/0 (3 overs)		Phannita Maya 22* (11)

Thailand won by 10 wickets
UKM-YSD Cricket Oval, Bangi
Umpires: Rokeya Sultana (Ban) and Venkatesan Krithika (Ind)
Player of the match: Sunida Chaturongrattana (Tha)

- Thailand won the toss and elected to field.
- Thipatcha Putthawong (Tha) played in her 100th WT20I match.

Match 13
4 June 2026
14:00 UTC+8
Scorecard

Japan; 188/4 (20 overs)	v	Mongolia; 72/8 (20 overs)
Ayaka Kato-Stafford 84 (56); Javzandulam Tugsjargal 1/21 (2 overs)		Batjargal Ichinkhorloo 13 (47); Mamta Kaswan 3/12 (4 overs)

Japan won by 116 runs
Bayuemas Oval, Pandamaran
Umpires: Afia Amin (Pak) and Humaira Farah (Pak)
Player of the match: Ayaka Kato-Stafford (Jpn)

- Mongolia won the toss and elected to field.

Match 19
6 June 2026
14:00 UTC+8
Scorecard

Japan; 106/4 (20 overs)	v	Myanmar; 94/7 (20 overs)
Akaya Kato-Stafford 42* (44); Wa Thone Nadi 2/9 (4 overs)		Zar Win 24 (24); Akaya Kato-Stafford 4/4 (4 overs)

Japan won by 12 runs
Selangor Turf Club, Kuala Lumpur
Umpires: Afia Amin (Pak) and Venkatesan Krithika (Ind)
Player of the match: Ayaka Kato-Stafford (Jpn)

- Myanmar won the toss and elected to field.

Match 21
6 June 2026
14:00 UTC+8
Scorecard

Bahrain; 97 (18.2 overs)	v	Mongolia; 98/7 (14.3 overs)
Deepika Rasangika 29 (21); Uugansuvd Bayarjavkhlan 3/20 (4 overs)		Nomin-Erdene Erdenebat 36 (37); Reshel D'Souza 2/14 (2 overs)

Mongolia won by 3 wickets
Bayuemas Oval, Pandamaran
Umpires: Saleema Imtiaz (Pak) and Sun Meng Yao (Chn)
Player of the match: Myagmarzaya Batnasan (Mgl)

- Bahrain won the toss and elected to bat.

Match 25
7 June 2026
09:30 UTC+8
Scorecard

Myanmar; 32/9 (17 overs)	v	Thailand; 33/0 (3.1 overs)
Shwe Yee Win 10* (23); Sunida Chaturongrattana 5/3 (3 overs)		Phannita Maya 22* (11)

Thailand won by 10 wickets
Bayuemas Oval, Pandamaran
Umpires: Nur Hirjah (Mas) and Sun Meng Yao (Chn)
Player of the match: Sunida Chaturongrattana (Tha)

- Thailand won the toss and elected to field.
- The match was reduced to 17 overs per side due to rain.
- Sunida Chaturongrattana (Tha) took her maiden five-wicket haul in WT20Is.

Match 27
7 June 2026
14:00 UTC+8
Scorecard

Japan; 142/5 (20 overs)	v	Bahrain; 94/3 (20 overs)
Ayaka Kato-Stafford 63 (61); Tharanga Gajanayke 2/27 (4 overs)		Sweeta Corda 34* (47); Shimako Kato 1/10 (4 overs)

Japan won by 48 runs
Bayuemas Oval, Pandamaran
Umpires: Nur Hirjah (Mas) and Sun Meng Yao (Chn)
Player of the match: Ayaka Kato-Stafford (Jpn)

- Japan won the toss and elected to bat.
- Bianca Shino-Dyson (Jpn) made her T20I debut.

Match 29
9 June 2026
09:30 UTC+8
Scorecard

Thailand; 126/6 (20 overs)	v	Japan; 84 (20 overs)
Nannapat Koncharoenkai 47* (42); Ayaka Kato-Stafford 2/15 (4 overs)		Ayaka Kato-Stafford 29 (40); Thipatcha Putthawong 3/6 (4 overs)

Thailand won by 42 runs
Bayuemas Oval, Pandamaran
Umpires: Ankita Guha (Ind) and Nur Hijrah (Mas)
Player of the match: Nannapat Koncharoenkai (Tha)

- Thailand won the toss and elected to bat.
- Koranit Suwanchonrathi (Tha) made her T20I debut.

Match 30
9 June 2026
14:00 UTC+8
Scorecard

Myanmar; 182/1 (20 overs)	v	Mongolia; 80/9 (20 overs)
Khin Myat 68* (57)		Batjargal Ichinkhorloo 24 (35); Zar Win 3/28 (4 overs)

Myanmar won by 102 runs
UKM-YSD Cricket Oval, Bangi
Umpires: Afia Amin (Pak) and Dedunu Silva (SL)
Player of the match: Khin Myat (Mya)

- Myanmar won the toss and elected to bat.

=== Group B ===
Group B standings
Pos	Team	Pld	W	L	NR	Pts	NRR	Qualification
1	United Arab Emirates	4	4	0	0	8	7.923	Advanced to the knockout stage
2	Oman	4	3	1	0	6	1.161	Advanced to the knockout stage
3	China	4	1	2	1	3	0.100	Eliminated
4	Philippines	4	1	3	0	2	−1.332	Eliminated
5	Saudi Arabia	4	0	3	1	1	−8.964	Eliminated

Source: ESPNcricinfo

Match 2
3 June 2026
09:30 UTC+8
Scorecard

Saudi Arabia; 27 (15.3 overs)	v	United Arab Emirates; 30/0 (0.5 overs)
Mashael Waqas 9 (22); Heena Hotchandani 3/4 (2.3 overs)		Esha Oza 15* (5)

United Arab Emirates won by 10 wickets
UKM-YSD Cricket Oval, Bangi
Umpires: Afia Amin (Pak) and Rokeya Sultana (Ban)
Player of the match: Suraksha Kotte (UAE)

- Saudi Arabia won the toss and elected to bat.
- Laiba Arif, Rizwana Begum (Sau), Janani Thirukkumaran and Mehul Kulkarni (UAE) all made their T20I debuts.

Match 6
3 June 2026
14:00 UTC+8
Scorecard

Oman; 105/7 (20 overs)	v	China; 89 (18.4 overs)
Amanda DCosta 27 (27); Ma Ruike 2/16 (4 overs)		Mingyue Zhu 18 (26); Sushanthika Sathiya 2/11 (3 overs)

Oman won by 16 runs
UKM-YSD Cricket Oval, Bangi
Umpires: Afia Amin (Pak) and Rokeya Sultana (Ban)
Player of the match: Priyanka Mendonca (Oma)

- China won the toss and elected to field.

Match 11
4 June 2026
09:30 UTC+8
Scorecard

Oman; 64/9 (20 overs)	v	United Arab Emirates; 66/1 (6.4 overs)
Jayadhanyha Gunasekar 11 (22); Vaishnave Mahesh 3/13 (4 overs)		Esha Oza 31* (19); Sushanthika Sathiya 1/25 (2 overs)

United Arab Emirates won by 9 wickets
Selangor Turf Club, Kuala Lumpur
Umpires: Saleema Imtiaz (Pak) and Dedunu Silva (SL)
Player of the match: Esha Oza (UAE)

- Oman won the toss and elected to bat.

Match 14
4 June 2026
14:00 UTC+8
Scorecard

Philippines; 203/5 (20 overs)	v	Saudi Arabia; 70/9 (20 overs)
Karri Keen 67* (35); Mah Noor 3/35 (2 overs)		Sara 19 (30); Kyte Keen 3/15 (4 overs)

Philippines won by 133 runs
UKM-YSD Cricket Oval, Bangi
Umpires: Venkatesan Krithika (Ind) and Rokeya Sultana (Ban)
Player of the match: Katie Donovan (Phi)

- Philippines won the toss and elected to bat.
- Zoe Isabela Wong (Phi), Maheen Aamir and Afshan Khan (Sau) all made their T20I debuts.

Match 18
6 June 2026
09:30 UTC+8
Scorecard

Philippines; 103/6 (20 overs)	v	China; 104/2 (13.3 overs)
Kari Keen 46 (44); Ma Ruike 2/17 (4 overs)		Wang Huiying 50* (34); Jhon Andreano 1/20 (2.3 overs)

China won by 8 wickets
UKM-YSD Cricket Oval, Bangi
Umpires: Dedunu Silva (SL) and Ankita Guha (Ind)
Player of the match: Wang Huiying (Chn)

- Philippines won the toss and elected to bat.

Match 22
6 June 2026
14:00 UTC+8
Scorecard

Saudi Arabia; 38 (13.4 overs)	v	Oman; 39/0 (3.2 overs)
Najwa Akram 8 (17); Priyanka Mendonca 5/8 (4 overs)		Jayadhanyha Gunasekar 31* (14)

Oman won by 10 wickets
UKM-YSD Cricket Oval, Bangi
Umpires: Ankita Guha (Ind) and Dedunu Silva (SL)
Player of the match: Priyanka Mendonca (Oma)

- Oman won the toss and elected to field.
- Priyanka Mendonca (Oma) took her maiden five-wicket haul in WT20Is.

Match 26
7 June 2026
09:30 UTC+8
Scorecard

United Arab Emirates; 47/3 (5 overs)	v	China; 29/5 (5 overs)
Esha Oza 29* (18); Ma Ruike 1/16 (2 overs)		Mingyue Zhu 9 (4); Heena Hotchandani 3/8 (2 overs)

United Arab Emirates won by 18 runs
UKM-YSD Cricket Oval, Bangi
Umpires: Rokeya Sultana (Ban) and Venkatesan Krithika (Ind)
Player of the match: Heena Hotchandani (UAE)

- China won the toss and elected to field.
- The match was reduced to 5 overs per side due to rain.

Match 28
7 June 2026
14:00 UTC+8
Scorecard

Oman; 141/6 (20 overs)	v	Philippines; 97/7 (20 overs)
Fiza Javed 43 (35); Jhon Andreano 1/18 (3 overs)		Amelia Valdez 25 (14); Amanda Dcosta 4/21 (4 overs)

Oman won by 44 runs
UKM-YSD Cricket Oval, Bangi
Umpires: Venkatesan Krithika (Ind) and Rokeya Sultana (Ban)
Player of the match: Amanda Dcosta (Oma)

- Philippines won the toss and elected to field.

Match 31
9 June 2026
09:30 UTC+8
Scorecard

United Arab Emirates; 200/5 (20 overs)	v	Philippines; 51 (12.1 overs)
Esha Oza 92 (57); Katie Donovan 3/25 (4 overs)		Amelia Valdez 18 (19); Esha Oza 3/3 (2.1 overs)

United Arab Emirates won by 149 runs
Bayuemas Oval, Pandamaran
Umpires: Ankita Guha (Ind) and Nur Hijrah (Mas)
Player of the match: Esha Oza (UAE)

- Philippines won the toss and elected to field.
- Simran Sheth (UAE) made her T20I debut.

Match 32
9 June 2026
14:00 UTC+8
Scorecard

Saudi Arabia; 39/7 (20 overs)	v	China; 24/2 (2.4 overs)
Sara 11 (39); Chen Xinyu 3/3 (2 overs)		Li Jiaping 14* (9); Laiba Nasrullah 1/6 (0.4 overs)

No result
UKM-YSD Cricket Oval, Bangi
Umpires: Afia Amin (Pak) and Dedunu Silva (SL)

- Saudi Arabia won the toss and elected to bat.
- No further play was possible due to rain.
- Lyu Yihan (Chn) made her T20I debut.

=== Group C ===
Group C standings
Pos	Team	Pld	W	L	NR	Pts	NRR	Qualification
1	Indonesia	3	3	0	0	6	2.315	Advanced to the knockout stage
2	Malaysia (H)	3	2	1	0	4	0.663	Advanced to the knockout stage
3	Kuwait	3	1	2	0	2	−0.745	Eliminated
4	Singapore	3	0	3	0	0	−2.232	Eliminated

Source: ESPNcricinfo
(H) Hosts

Match 1
3 June 2026
09:30 UTC+8
Scorecard

Malaysia; 102/7 (20 overs)	v	Kuwait; 93/7 (20 overs)
Dhanusri Muhunan 28 (28); Candice Dias 2/10 (4 overs)		Zeefa Jilani 34 (45); Nur Dania Syuhada 2/15 (4 overs)

Malaysia won by 9 runs
Bayuemas Oval, Pandamaran
Umpires: Venkatesan Krithika (Ind) and Dedunu Silva (SL)
Player of the match: Winifred Duraisingam (Mas)

- Malaysia won the toss and elected to bat.

Match 7
3 June 2026
14:00 UTC+8
Scorecard

Singapore; 82/7 (20 overs)	v	Indonesia; 83/2 (10.5 overs)
Shafina Mahesh 24 (25); Sang Maypriani 2/14 (4 overs)		Ni Putu Ayu Nanda Sakarini 29* (17); Shafina Mahesh 1/13 (2.5 overs)

Indonesia won by 8 wickets
Selangor Turf Club, Kuala Lumpur
Umpires: Humaira Farah (Pak) and Ankita Guha (Ind)
Player of the match: Sang Maypriani (Idn)

- Singapore won the toss and elected to bat.
- Rashmeka Badri Narayanan (Sin) made her T20I debut.

Match 9
4 June 2026
09:30 UTC+8
Scorecard

Malaysia; 120/6 (20 overs)	v	Singapore; 80/6 (20 overs)
Mahirah Izzati Ismail 48* (50); Vinu Kumar 2/21 (4 overs)		Roshni Seth 18 (21); Ainna Hamizah Hashim 1/10 (3.1 overs)

Malaysia won by 40 runs
Bayuemas Oval, Pandamaran
Umpires: Afia Amin (Pak) and Humaira Farah (Pak)
Player of the match: Mahirah Izzati Ismail (Mas)

- Singapore won the toss and elected to field.

Match 15
4 June 2026
14:00 UTC+8
Scorecard

Kuwait; 60/9 (20 overs)	v	Indonesia; 61/0 (8.5 overs)
Siobhan Gomez 20 (23); Derni Bangi 4/5 (4 overs)		Rahmawati Pangestuti 36* (22)

Indonesia won by 10 wickets
Selangor Turf Club, Kuala Lumpur
Umpires: Saleema Imtiaz (Pak) and Dedunu Silva (SL)
Player of the match: Derni Bangi (Idn)

- Indonesia won the toss and elected to field.

Match 17
6 June 2026
09:30 UTC+8
Scorecard

Malaysia; 87/6 (20 overs)	v	Indonesia; 88/4 (18.1 overs)
Winifred Duraisingam 25 (41); Fitria Rada Rani 2/14 (4 overs)		Ni Putu Ayu Nanda Sakarini 25* (30); Mahirah Izzati Ismail 2/20 (4 overs)

Indonesia won by 6 wickets
Bayuemas Oval, Pandamaran
Umpires: Saleema Imtiaz (Pak) and Sun Meng Yao (Chn)
Player of the match: Ni Putu Ayu Nanda Sakarini (Idn)

- Indonesia won the toss and elected to field.

Match 23
6 June 2026
14:00 UTC+8
Scorecard

Singapore; 94/6 (20 overs)	v	Kuwait; 97/0 (15.2 overs)
Roshni Seth 57* (39); Maryam Omar 2/12 (4 overs)		Priyada Murali 44* (47)

Kuwait won by 10 wickets
Selangor Turf Club, Kuala Lumpur
Umpires: Afia Amin (Pak) and Venkatesan Krithika (Ind)
Player of the match: Siobhan Gomez (Kuw)

- Kuwait won the toss and elected to field.

=== Group D ===
Group D standings
Pos	Team	Pld	W	L	NR	Pts	NRR	Qualification
1	Hong Kong	3	3	0	0	6	2.767	Advanced to the knockout stage
2	Nepal	3	2	1	0	4	0.428	Advanced to the knockout stage
3	Bhutan	3	1	2	0	2	−0.947	Eliminated
4	Qatar	3	0	3	0	0	−2.666	Eliminated

Source: ESPNcricinfo

Match 4
3 June 2026
09:30 UTC+8
Scorecard

Qatar; 76 (16.5 overs)	v	Nepal; 78/2 (10.5 overs)
Getrude Chandiru 25 (19); Rubina Chhetry 3/8 (3.5 overs)		Bindu Rawal 33 (30); Khadija Imtiaz 1/7 (1 over)

Nepal won by 8 wickets
Kolej Tuanku Jaafar Cricket Oval, Mantin
Umpires: Saleema Imtiaz (Pak) and Nur Hijrah (Mas)
Player of the match: Rubina Chhetry (Nep)

- Nepal won the toss and elected to field.
- Roshni Sebastian (Qat) made her T20I debut.

Match 8
3 June 2026
14:00 UTC+8
Scorecard

Hong Kong; 133/3 (20 overs)	v	Bhutan; 119/6 (20 overs)
Yasmin Daswani 35 (41); Tshering Zangmo 2/17 (4 overs)		Dechen Wangmo 39 (39); Maryam Bibi 3/8 (2 overs)

Hong Kong won by 14 runs
Kolej Tuanku Jaafar Cricket Oval, Mantin
Umpires: Nur Hijrah (Mas) and Saleema Imtiaz (Pak)
Player of the match: Maryam Bibi (HK)

- Hong Kong won the toss and elected to bat.
- Samjana Mongar (Bhu) made her T20I debut.

Match 12
4 June 2026
09:30 UTC+8
Scorecard

Nepal; 113 (20 overs)	v	Bhutan; 62/8 (20 overs)
Sita Rana Magar 37 (28); Sonam 3/12 (4 overs)		Dechen Wangmo 39 (60); Rubina Chhetry 3/15 (4 overs)

Nepal won by 51 runs
Kolej Tuanku Jaafar Cricket Oval, Mantin
Umpires: Ankita Guha (Ind) and Sun Meng Yao (Chn)
Player of the match: Rubina Chhetry (Nep)

- Bhutan won the toss and elected to field.
- Ritshi Choden (Bhu) became the first female cricketer to be timed out in an international match.

Match 16
4 June 2026
14:00 UTC+8
Scorecard

Hong Kong; 164/3 (20 overs)	v	Qatar; 81 (17.2 overs)
Yasmin Daswani 84* (64); Krisheta Sarvanakumar 1/22 (2 overs)		Krisheta Sarvanakumar 20 (22); Kary Chan 3/17 (4 overs)

Hong Kong won by 83 runs
Kolej Tuanku Jaafar Cricket Oval, Mantin
Umpires: Ankita Guha (Ind) and Sun Meng Yao (Chn)
Player of the match: Yasmin Daswani (HK)

- Qatar won the toss and elected to field.
- Jaza Mariyam (Qat) made her T20I debut.

Match 20
6 June 2026
09:30 UTC+8
Scorecard

Qatar; 99/7 (20 overs)	v	Bhutan; 100/5 (18.3 overs)
Shrutiben Rana 30 (34); Riya Pradhan 2/13 (3 overs)		Ngawang Choden 20 (18); Khadija Imitaz 2/16 (4 overs)

Bhutan won by 5 wickets
Kolej Tuanku Jaafar Cricket Oval, Mantin
Umpires: Rokeya Sultana (Ban) and Nur Hijrah (Mas)
Player of the match: Ngawang Choden (Bhu)

- Bhutan won the toss and elected to field.

Match 24
6 June 2026
14:00 UTC+8
Scorecard

Hong Kong; 109/3 (20 overs)	v	Nepal; 40 (13.3 overs)
Yasmin Daswani 42* (44); Rubina Chhetry 1/20 (4 overs)		Sony Pakhrin 12 (23); Iqra Sahar 4/4 (4 overs)

Hong Kong won by 69 runs
Kolej Tuanku Jaafar Cricket Oval, Mantin
Umpires: Nur Hijrah (Mas) and Rokeya Sultana (Ban)
Player of the match: Iqra Sahar (HK)

- Nepal won the toss and elected to field.

== Knockout stage ==
The knockout stage consisted of four quarter-finals played on 10 June, two semi-finals played on 12 June, a 3rd place-playoff and a final played on 13 June. The top four teams (winners of the quarter-finals / semi-finalists): Thailand, the United Arab Emirates, Indonesia and Hong Kong qualified for the 2026 Women's Twenty20 Asia Cup.

=== Bracket ===
Quarter-finals
A1	Thailand	130/4 (20 overs)
D2	Nepal	74/7 (20 overs)
C1	Indonesia	137/7 (20 overs)
B2	Oman	24 (11.5 overs)
D1	Hong Kong	140/5 (20 overs)
A2	Japan	99 (19.1 overs)
B1	United Arab Emirates	138/2 (20 overs)
C2	Malaysia	86/5 (20 overs)

Semi-finals
QF1W	Thailand	67/4 (12 overs)
QF4W	Indonesia	66 (18.4 overs)
QF2W	Hong Kong	56 (14.3 overs)
QF3W	United Arab Emirates	57/0 (7 overs)

Final
SF1W	Thailand	96/4 (18.1 overs)
SF2W	United Arab Emirates	95/9 (20 overs)
3rd place play-off
SF1L	Indonesia	108/4 (18.3 overs)
SF2L	Hong Kong	107/7 (20 overs)

=== Quarter-finals ===
Quarter-final 1
10 June 2026
09:30 UTC+8
Scorecard

Thailand; 130/4 (20 overs)	v	Nepal; 74/7 (20 overs)
Nannapat Koncharoenkai 62* (51); Rubina Chhetry 1/11 (4 overs)		Rubina Chhetry 20* (23); Thipatcha Putthawong 2/7 (4 overs)

Thailand won by 56 runs
Bayuemas Oval, Pandamaran
Umpires: Humaira Farah (Pak) and Venkatesan Krithika (Ind)
Player of the match: Nannapat Koncharoenkai (Tha)

- Thailand won the toss and elected to bat.

Quarter-final 2
10 June 2026
09:30 UTC+8
Scorecard

Hong Kong; 140/5 (20 overs)	v	Japan; 99 (19.1 overs)
Yasmin Daswani 55* (36); Nonoha Yasumoto 1/16 (2 overs)		Haruna Iwasaki 26 (20); Maryam Bibi 3/17 (4 overs)

Hong Kong won by 41 runs
UKM-YSD Cricket Oval, Bangi
Umpires: Ankita Guha (Ind) and Rokeya Sultana (Ban)
Player of the match: Yasmin Daswani (HK)

- Japan won the toss and elected to field.

Quarter-final 3
10 June 2026
14:00 UTC+8
Scorecard

United Arab Emirates; 138/2 (20 overs)	v	Malaysia; 86/5 (20 overs)
Theertha Satish 65* (53); Winifred Duraisingam 2/32 (4 overs)		Mas Elysa 39 (47); Esha Oza 2/16 (4 overs)

United Arab Emirates won by 52 runs
Bayuemas Oval, Pandamaran
Umpires: Humaira Farah (Pak) and Dedunu Silva (SL)
Player of the match: Esha Oza (UAE)

- United Arab Emirates won the toss and elected to bat.

Quarter-final 4
10 June 2026
14:00 UTC+8
Scorecard

Indonesia; 137/7 (20 overs)	v	Oman; 24 (11.5 overs)
Ni Putu Ayu Nanda Sakarini 51 (49); Priyanka Mendonca 2/38 (4 overs)		Hina Javed 4 (6); Ni Made Putri Suwandewi 4/11 (4 overs)

Indonesia won by 113 runs
UKM-YSD Cricket Oval, Bangi
Umpires: Afia Amin (Pak) and Ankita Guha (Ind)
Player of the match: Ni Made Putri Suwandewi (Idn)

- Indonesia won the toss and elected to bat.

=== Semi-finals ===
Semi-final 1
12 June 2026
09:30 UTC+8
Scorecard

Indonesia; 66 (18.4 overs)	v	Thailand; 67/4 (12 overs)
Ni Putu Ayu Nanda Sakarini 17 (24); Phannita Maya 3/13 (3.4 overs)		Aphisara Suwanchonrathi 18* (9); Sang Maypriani 2/21 (4 overs)

Thailand won by 6 wickets
Bayuemas Oval, Pandamaran
Umpires: Saleema Imtiaz (Pak) and Dedunu Silva
Player of the match: Phannita Maya (Tha)

- Indonesia won the toss and elected to bat.

Semi-final 2
12 June 2026
14:00 UTC+8
Scorecard

Hong Kong; 56 (14.3 overs)	v	United Arab Emirates; 57/0 (7 overs)
Natasha Miles 13 (12); Vaishnave Mahesh 3/5 (2.3 overs)		Esha Oza 37* (30)

United Arab Emirates won by 10 wickets
Bayuemas Oval, Pandamaran
Umpires: Nur Hijrah (Mas) and Venkatesan Krithika (Ind)
Player of the match: Esha Oza (UAE)

- Hong Kong won the toss and elected to bat.

=== 3rd place play-off ===
3rd place play-off
13 June 2026
09:30 UTC+8
Scorecard

Hong Kong; 107/7 (20 overs)	v	Indonesia; 108/4 (18.3 overs)
Yasmin Daswani 52 (52); Ni Made Putri Suwandewi 2/12 (3 overs)		Desi Wulandari 22 (27); Kary Chan 2/24 (4 overs)

Indonesia won by 6 wickets
Bayuemas Oval, Pandamaran
Umpires: Humaira Farah (Pak) and Ankita Guha (Ind)
Player of the match: Ni Made Putri Suwandewi (Idn)

- Hong Kong won the toss and elected to bat.

=== Final ===
Final
13 June 2026
14:30 UTC+8
Scorecard

United Arab Emirates; 95/9 (20 overs)	v	Thailand; 96/4 (18.1 overs)
Esha Oza 31 (37); Thipatcha Putthawong 3/15 (4 overs)		Nannapat Koncharoenkai 36* (32); Esha Oza 1/12 (2.1 overs)

Thailand won by 6 wickets
Bayuemas Oval, Pandamaran
Umpires: Saleema Imtiaz (Pak) and Dedunu Silva (SL)
Player of the match: Nannapat Koncharoenkai (Tha)

- Thailand won the toss and elected to field.

== See also ==
- International cricket in 2026
- Associate international cricket in 2026
- 2026 ACC Men's Challenger Cup
- 2026 ACC Men's Premier Cup
