= ACC Women's Premier Cup =

International associate Twenty20 cricket competition

- Administrator: Asian Cricket Council
- Format: Women's Twenty20 International
- First edition: 2024: Malaysia
- Latest edition: 2026: Malaysia
- Next edition: 2028: TBA
- Tournament format: see below
- Number of teams: 18
- Current champion: Thailand (1st title)
- Most successful: Thailand; United Arab Emirates (1 title each)
- Most runs: (United Arab Emirates) Esha Oza (526)
- Most wickets: (Thailand) Thipatcha Putthawong (24)

The ACC Women's Premier Cup is a biennial international cricket competition in Women's Twenty20 International (WT20I) format, organised by the Asian Cricket Council (ACC) since its inauguration in 2024. The competition is played by the associate members of the ACC to determine qualification for the Women's Twenty20 Asia Cup.

As of 2026, two editions have been played; a total of nineteen nations have played in the Premier Cup. Fifteen teams have competed in every tournament, two of whom—Thailand (2026) and the United Arab Emirates (2024)—have won the title. Thailand are the current champions, having won the 2026 edition. The next edition of the tournament will take place in 2028.

== History ==
In January 2023, the ACC released the 2023–2024 calendar of events, which included a "Women's Premier Cup" WT20I tournament as part of the associate teams' qualification pathway for the Women's Twenty20 Asia Cup. Associate nations interested in hosting the event submit their "Expression of Interest" bid to the ACC, from which the final hosts for each tournament are selected. The inaugural tournament was held in Malaysia in February 2024 featuring 16 teams. The second tournament was also held in Malaysia in June 2026 featuring 18 teams.

Host countries of Women's Premier Cup in Asia continent

== Tournament format ==
The Premier Cup is played in two stages. The preliminary stage or group stage is played by 4 groups in a round-robin format. The second round is played as a knockout stage of eight teams. (Note: References for tournament formats: 2024, 2026) In case of a tie (that is, both teams scoring the same number of runs at the end of their respective innings), a Super Over is used to decide the winner. In the case of a tie occurring again in the Super Over, subsequent Super Overs would be played until there is a winner.

Summary of tournament formats (2024–2026)
#	Year	Teams	Matches	Preliminary stage	Final stage
1	2024	16	31	4 groups of 4 teams: 24 matches	Knockout of 8 teams: 7 matches
2	2026	18	40	2 groups of 5 teams: 20 matches & 2 groups of 4 teams: 12 matches	Knockout of 8 teams: 8 matches

== Summary ==
Details of Women's Premier Cup tournaments
#	Year	Dates	Host(s)	Venues	Ref.
1	2024	10 – 18 February 2024	Malaysian Cricket Association	4 in Malaysia	
2	2026	3 – 13 June 2026	Malaysian Cricket Association	4 in Malaysia	

=== Final results ===
Details of Women's Premier Cup finals
Year	Final				Ref.
Year	Date & venue	Winner	Victory margin	Runner-up	Ref.
2024	18 February 2024; Bayuemas Oval, Pandamaran	United Arab Emirates; 105/3 (20 overs)	37 runs	Malaysia; 68/9 (20 overs)	
2026	13 June 2026; Bayuemas Oval, Pandamaran	Thailand; 96/4 (18.1 overs)	6 wickets	United Arab Emirates; 95/9 (20 overs)	

== Team performances ==
As of the 2026 tournament, nineteen nations have played in the Premier Cup. Fifteen teams have competed in every tournament, two of whom have won the title. Thailand (2026) and the United Arab Emirates (2024) have each won the title once. The United Arab Emirates have made two final appearances while, both Thailand and the United Arab Emirates have each made two semi-final appearances. Hong Kong, Indonesia, Japan, Malaysia, Nepal, Thailand and the United Arab Emirates have made two quarter-final appearances each. The best performance by a host team is runners-up by Malaysia in 2024. The United Arab Emirates also have the highest victory percentage in Premier Cup matches (92.30%).

=== By tournament ===
An overview of the teams' performances in every Premier Cup is given below.

Legend

- W Winners
- RU Runners-up
- SF Semi-finalist (2024)
- 3rd 3rd place (2026)
- 4th 4th place (2026)
- QF Quarter-finalist
- R1 Preliminary round (group stage)
- Q Qualified
- × Withdrew
- ×× Ineligible (suspended)
- * Hosts
- ↑ Advanced to the respective Women's Twenty20 Asia Cup

† denotes countries that are members of both the Asian Cricket Council and ICC East Asia-Pacific.

Team performances in each Women's Premier Cup tournament
Edition (No. of teams)	2024 (16)	2026 (18)	Apps
Location(s) Team	(Malaysia)	(Malaysia)	Apps
Bahrain	R1	R1	2
Bhutan	R1	R1	2
China	R1	R1	2
Hong Kong	QF	4th↑	2
Indonesia†	QF	3rd↑	2
Japan†	QF	QF	2
Kuwait	QF	R1	2
Malaysia	RU*↑	QF*	2
Maldives	R1	—N/a	1
Mongolia	—N/a	R1	1
Myanmar	R1	R1	2
Nepal	SF↑	QF	2
Oman	R1	QF	2
Philippines†	—N/a	R1	1
Qatar	R1	R1	2
Saudi Arabia	—N/a	R1	1
Singapore	R1	R1	2
Thailand	SF↑	W↑	2
United Arab Emirates	W↑	RU↑	2
Ref.			

=== Overall ===
The table below provides a summary of the performances of teams over past Premier Cups.

† denotes countries that are members of both the Asian Cricket Council and ICC East Asia-Pacific.

Overall team performances in Women's Premier Cup tournaments
Team (Note: Teams are ordered by their best performance, then winning percentage, then (if equal) by alphabetical order.)	Apps	Mat	Won	Lost	N/R	Win % (Note: Excluding no result matches)	Best performance
United Arab Emirates	2	13	12	1	0	92.30	Winners (2024)
Thailand	2	12	11	1	0	91.66	Winners (2026)
Malaysia	2	10	7	3	0	70.00	Runners-up (2024)
Indonesia†	2	10	7	3	0	70.00	Semi-finals (2026)
Nepal	2	9	6	3	0	66.66	Semi-finals (2024)
Hong Kong	2	10	6	4	0	60.00	Semi-finals (2026)
Japan†	2	9	5	4	0	55.55	Quarter-finals (2024, 2026)
Kuwait	2	7	3	4	0	42.85	Quarter-finals (2024)
Oman	2	8	3	5	0	37.50	Quarter-finals (2026)
Myanmar	2	7	3	4	0	42.85	First round (2024, 2026)
Bhutan	2	6	2	4	0	33.33	First round (2024, 2026)
China	2	7	2	4	1	33.33	First round (2024, 2026)
Qatar	2	6	1	5	0	16.66	First round (2024, 2026)
Bahrain	2	7	0	7	0	0.00	First round (2024, 2026)
Singapore	2	6	0	6	0	0.00	First round (2024, 2026)
Mongolia	1	4	1	3	0	25.00	First round (2026)
Philippines†	1	4	1	3	0	25.00	First round (2026)
Maldives	1	3	0	3	0	0.00	First round (2024)
Saudi Arabia	1	4	0	3	1	0.00	First round (2026)
As of 2026 ACC Women's Premier Cup Source: Cricinfo

=== Debutant teams by tournament ===
† denotes countries that are members of both the Asian Cricket Council and ICC East Asia-Pacific.

Debutant teams in each Women's Premier Cup tournament
Year	Debutant teams				Total
2024	Bahrain	Bhutan	China	Hong Kong	16
2024	Indonesia†	Japan†	Kuwait	Malaysia	16
2024	Maldives	Myanmar	Nepal	Oman	16
2024	Qatar	Singapore	Thailand	United Arab Emirates	16
2026	Mongolia	Philippines†	Saudi Arabia		3
Total					19

== Records ==
As of the 2026 tournament, six players of the United Arab Emirates hold the record for most appearances in Premier Cup matches (13), of which Esha Oza holds the record for the most Premier Cup matches as a captain (13). Bayuemas Oval in Kuala Lumpur, Malaysia, has hosted the most Premier Cup matches (27). Malaysian umpire Nur Hijrah has umpired the most Premier Cup matches (15). A total of three centuries and four 100-run partnerships have been scored while, 6 hat-tricks, 4 five-wicket hauls and 15 four-wicket hauls have been taken in the tournaments. Esha Oza also holds the record for most runs (526), and most runs in a tournament (277 in 2026). Thipatcha Putthawong of Thailand holds the record for most wickets (24), and most wickets in a tournament (16 in 2026). Nannapat Koncharoenkai of Thailand holds the record for most dismissals by a wicket-keeper (14) and Marina Lamplough of Hong Kong holds the record for most catches by a fielder (9).

=== Overall records ===
Team records
Record for	Record holder	Record	Tournament(s)	Ref.
Highest team total	Nepal (v Maldives) at Bangi	227/4	2024	
Lowest team total	Maldives (v Nepal) at Bangi	13/10	2024	
Highest match aggregate	Philippines v Saudi Arabia at Bangi	273/14	2026	
Lowest match aggregate	Mongolia v Thailand at Kuala Lumpur	40/10	2026	

Batting records
Record for	Record holder	Record	Tournament(s)	Ref.
Most runs	(United Arab Emirates) Esha Oza	526	2024 – 2026	
Most runs in a tournament	(United Arab Emirates) Esha Oza	277	2026	
Highest score	(Nepal) Rubina Chhetry (v Maldives) at Bangi	118*	2024	
Most centuries	3 players	1	2024	
Highest partnership	(Hong Kong) Mariko Hill & Kary Chan (v Maldives) at Kuala Lumpur	176	2024	

Bowling records
Record for	Record holder	Record	Tournament(s)	Ref.
Most wickets	(Thailand) Thipatcha Putthawong	24	2024 – 2026	
Most wickets in a tournament	(Thailand) Thipatcha Putthawong	16	2026	
Best bowling figures	(Thailand) Thipatcha Putthawong (v Mongolia) at Kuala Lumpur (Thailand) Sunida Chaturongrattana (v Myanmar) at Kuala Lumpur	5/3	2026	
Most four-wicket hauls	15 players	1	2024 – 2026	
Most five-wicket hauls	4 players	1	2024 – 2026	

Fielding records
Record for	Record holder	Record	Tournament(s)	Ref.
Most wicket-keeper dismissals	(Thailand) Nannapat Koncharoenkai	14	2024 – 2026	
Most wicket-keeper dismissals in a tournament	(United Arab Emirates) Theertha Satish (Thailand) Nannapat Koncharoenkai	9	2024 2026	
Most catches	(Hong Kong) Marina Lamplough	9	2024 – 2026	
Most catches in a tournament	(Hong Kong) Marina Lamplough	6	2026	

=== Tournament records ===
Records by tournament
Edition	Most runs	Most wickets	Ref.
2024	(United Arab Emirates) Esha Oza (249)	(United Arab Emirates) Heena Hotchandani (13)	
2026	(United Arab Emirates) Esha Oza (277)	(Thailand) Thipatcha Putthawong (16)	

== See also ==
- Asia Cup – men's competition held since 1983
  - ACC Men's Premier Cup – equivalent men's competition held since 2023
  - ACC Men's Challenger Cup – similar men's competition held since 2023
- Asia Cup Rising Stars
- Under-19 Men's Asia Cup
- Women's Asia Cup Rising Stars
- Under-19 Women's T20 Asia Cup
