= 2024 ACC Women's Premier Cup =

International associate Twenty20 cricket tournament

- Dates: 10 – 18 February 2024
- Administrator: Asian Cricket Council
- Cricket format: Women's Twenty20 International
- Tournament format(s): Group stage and knockout stage
- Host: Malaysia
- Champions: United Arab Emirates (1st title)
- Runners-up: Malaysia
- Participants: 16
- Matches: 31
- Most runs: (United Arab Emirates) Esha Oza (249)
- Most wickets: (United Arab Emirates) Heena Hotchandani (13)

The 2024 ACC Women's Premier Cup was the inaugural edition of the ACC Women's Premier Cup, hosted by Malaysian Cricket Association from 10 to 18 February 2024. Sixteen associate teams competed in 31 matches across four venues in Malaysia. Hosts Malaysia were defeated in the final by the United Arab Emirates. The top four teams of the tournament: the United Arab Emirates, Malaysia, Thailand and Nepal qualified for the 2024 Women's Twenty20 Asia Cup.

== Background ==
The ACC Women's Premier Cup is a biennial international cricket competition in Women's Twenty20 International (WT20I) format, organised by the Asian Cricket Council (ACC). In January 2023, the tournament was announced as a part of the associate teams' qualification pathway for the Women's Twenty20 Asia Cup.

=== Format ===
The 16 participating teams were divided into four groups of four teams each. In the group stage, each team played each of the other teams in the group once in a round-robin format, and the top two teams in each group advanced to the knockout stage. The knockout stage consisted of four quarter-finals, two semi-finals and a final.

=== Venues ===
Tournament venues in Malaysia

The tournament was played across 4 venues in Malaysia: 8 matches at UKM-YSD Cricket Oval in Bangi (including quarter-finals 2 and 4), 6 matches each at Royal Selangor Club and Selangor Turf Club in Kuala Lumpur, and 11 matches at Bayuemas Oval in Pandamaran (including quarter-finals 1 and 3, both semi-finals and final).

== Squads ==
Following squads were announced for the tournament:

- Bahrain: Sadamali Bhakshala, Sana Butt (wk), Tharanga Gajanayake, Poorvaja Jagdeesha, Durriya Malik, Manal Malik, Ashwini Munglimane, Swarna Nunna, Nishma Pereira, Shashikala Prakash, Deepika Rasangika (c), Asha Samildeen, Pavithra Shetty, Ishara Suhun, Abeera Waris
- Bhutan: Ngawang Choden, Sonam Choden, Tshering Choden, Yeshey Choden, Karma Dema, Anjuli Ghalley, Anju Gurung, Nidupangmo, Chado Om, Sonam, Dechen Wangmo (c), Pema Yangchen (wk), Eva Yangzom, Sangay Zangmo, Tshering Zangmo
- China: Zheng Lili, Chen Jie (wk), Han Lili, Mengting Liu, Zi Mei (wk), Sun Meng Yao, Xu Qian, Zhang Xiangxue, Chen Xinyu, Zhi Xin Yu, Wenjing Yin, Yang Yu Xuan, Mingyue Zhu, Huang Zhuo (c)
- Hong Kong: Maryam Bibi, Betty Chan, Kary Chan (c), Hiu Ying Cheung (wk), Yasmin Daswani, Mariko Hill, Elysa Hubbard, Emma Lai, Marina Lamplough, Natasha Miles, Iqra Sahar, Shanzeen Shahzad (wk), Alison Siu, Ruchitha Venkatesh
- Indonesia: Andriani, Mia Arda, Ni Ariani, Maria Corazon, Kisi Kasse, Ni Luh Ketut, Sang Ayu, Rahmawati Pangestuti, Ni Kadek Fitria Rada Rani, Ni Putu Ayu Nanda Sakarini (wk), Ni Wayan Sariani (c), Ni Made Putri Suwandewi, Kadek Winda Prastini, Desi Wulandari
- Japan: Ahilya Chandel, Ayumi Fujikawa, Hinase Goto, Haruna Iwasaki, Shimako Kato, Elena Kusuda-Nairn, Akari Nishimura (wk), Erika Oda, Meg Ogawa, Kurumi Ota, Seika Sumi, Erika Toguchi-Quinn, Mai Yanagida (c), Nonoha Yasumoto
- Kuwait: Maryyam Ashraf, Suchitha D'Sa (wk), Venora D'Souza, Siobhan Lee Gomez, Mariamma Hyder, Maria Jasvi, Zeefa Jilani, Khadija Khalil (wk), Glenda Menezes, Priyada Murali, Maryam Omar, Balasubramani Shanti, Amna Tariq (c), Madeeha Zuberi
- Malaysia: Nur Aishah, Winifred Duraisingam (c), Amalin Sorfina, Aisya Eleesa, Mas Elysa, Ainna Hamizah Hashim, Elsa Hunter, Jamahidaya Intan, Mahirah Izzati Ismail, Wan Julia (wk), Dhanusri Muhunan, Aina Najwa (wk), Nur Arianna Natsya, Nur Dania Syuhada
- Maldives: Hafsaa Abdhulla (wk), Sumayya Abdul (c), Shamma Ali, Fathimath Anaal, Sajaa Fathimath, Laisha Haleemath, Hawwa Ifasha, Leen Luthufee, Fathimath Malha, Nabaa Naseem, Hamza Niyaz, Aishath Meesa Rameez, Hawwa Shaaiqa
- Myanmar: Htet Aung, Thae Thae Aung, Zin Kyaw. Zon Lin, Aye Moe, Khin Min, Htwe Neaung, May San, Theint Soe (c), Thae Thae Po (wk), Zar Thoon, Lin Tun, Shwe Yee Win, Zar Win
- Nepal: Indu Barma (c), Apsari Begam, Dolly Bhatta, Rubina Chhetry, Kabita Joshi, Asmina Karmacharya, Kabita Kunwar, Samjhana Khadka, Puja Mahato, Sita Rana Magar, Bindu Rawal, Sangita Rai, Kajal Shrestha (wk), Roma Thapa
- Oman: Amanda Dcosta, Akshadha Gunasekar, Javed Hina, Sahana Jeelany, Nitya Joshi, Sameera Khan, Priyanka Mendonca (c), Trupti Pawde, Shreya Prabhu, Cynthia Saldanha (wk), Alifiya Sayed, Sakshi Shetty, Sushama Shetty, Sani Zehra
- Qatar: Sarrinah Ahmed, Aysha (c), Rizpha Bano Emmanuel (wk), Krishna Bhuva, Saachi Dhadwal, Taful Elkhair, Khadija Imtiaz, Trupti Kale, Shrutiben Rana Kamleshbhai, Devanandha Kavinisseri, Angeline Mare, Sabeeja Panayan, Rochelle Quyn, Sudha Thapa
- Singapore: Ada Bhasin, Riyaa Bhasin, Haresh Dhavina, Diviya G K, Devika Galia, Piumi Gurusinghe (wk), Vinu Kumar, Shafina Mahesh (c), Sara Merican, Jocelyn Pooranakaran, Johanna Pooranakaran, Damini Ramesh, Roshni Seth, Vathana Sreemurugavel
- Thailand: Naruemol Chaiwai (c), Natthakan Chantam, Nattaya Boochatham, Nanthita Boonsukham, Kanyakorn Bunthansen, Sunida Chaturongrattana, Onnicha Kamchomphu, Rosenanee Kanoh, Suwanan Khiaoto (wk), Nannapat Koncharoenkai (wk), Phannita Maya, Chayanisa Phengpaen, Thipatcha Putthawong, Chanida Sutthiruang, Apishara Suwanchonrati, Sornnarin Tippoch
- United Arab Emirates: Samaira Dharnidharka, Kavisha Egodage, Siya Gokhale, Heena Hotchandhani, Al Maseera Jahangir, Suraksha Kotte, Vaishnave Mahesh, Indhuja Nandakumar, Esha Oza (c, wk), Rinitha Rajith, Rishitha Rajith, Theertha Satish (wk), Khushi Sharma, Mehak Thakur

== Malaysia v Kuwait T20I series ==
Malaysia and Kuwait contested a three-match T20I series at the Johor Cricket Academy Oval in Johor Bahru from 4 to 6 February 2024, in preparation for the tournament. Malaysia won all three matches in the series.

1st T20I
4 February 2024
09:30 UTC+8
Scorecard

Malaysia; 108/6 (20 overs)	v	Kuwait; 82/7 (20 overs)
Winifred Duraisingam 31 (42); Maria Jasvi 3/23 (4 overs)		Maryyam Ashraf 22* (19); Nur Dania Syuhada 2/12 (4 overs)

Malaysia won by 26 runs
Johor Cricket Academy Oval, Johor Bahru
Umpires: Izmir Azraf (Mas) and Denish Sevakumaran (Mas)

- Kuwait won the toss and elected to field.

Kuwait women's cricket team in Malaysia in 2023–24
	Malaysia	Kuwait
- Dates: 4 – 6 February 2024
Captains	Winifred Duraisingam	Amna Tariq

Twenty20 International series
- Results: Malaysia won the 3-match series 3–0
Most runs	Wan Julia (73)	Amna Tariq (73)
Most wickets	Mahirah Izzati Ismail (5)	Maria Jasvi (6)

2nd T20I
5 February 2024
09:30 UTC+8
Scorecard

Kuwait; 98/7 (20 overs)	v	Malaysia; 99/5 (15.4 overs)
Amna Tariq 32* (37); Mahirah Izzati Ismail 2/14 (4 overs)		Wan Julia 25 (19); Maria Jasvi 3/13 (3 overs)

Malaysia won by 5 wickets
Johor Cricket Academy Oval, Johor Bahru
Umpires: Izmir Azraf (Mas) and Denish Sevakumaran (Mas)

- Malaysia won the toss and elected to field.

3rd T20I
6 February 2024
09:30 UTC+8
Scorecard

Kuwait; 77 (20 overs)	v	Malaysia; 78/0 (13.4 overs)
Amna Tariq 29 (44); Mahirah Izzati Ismail 3/11 (4 overs)		Ainna Hamizah Hashim 39 (49)

Malaysia won by 10 wickets
Johor Cricket Academy Oval, Johor Bahru
Umpires: Izmir Azraf (Mas) and Denish Sevakumaran (Mas)

- Malaysia won the toss and elected to field.

== Group stage ==
In the group stage, four groups of four teams played in a round-robin format for a total of 24 matches from 10 to 13 February 2024 across the four venues. The top two teams from each group: Thailand and Kuwait from group A, the United Arab Emirates and Japan from group B, Malaysia and Indonesia from group C and Nepal and Hong Kong from group D advanced to the knockout stage.

Group A	Group B	Group C	Group D
Kuwait; Myanmar; Singapore; Thailand	China; Japan; Oman; United Arab Emirates	Bahrain; Indonesia; Malaysia; Qatar	Bhutan; Hong Kong; Maldives; Nepal

=== Group A ===
Group A standings
Pos	Team	Pld	W	L	NR	Pts	NRR	Qualification
1	Thailand	3	3	0	0	6	5.729	Advanced to the knockout stage
2	Kuwait	3	2	1	0	4	−0.514	Advanced to the knockout stage
3	Myanmar	3	1	2	0	2	−1.507	Eliminated
4	Singapore	3	0	3	0	0	−2.900	Eliminated

Source: ESPNcricinfo

Match 1
10 February 2024
09:30 UTC+8
Scorecard

Myanmar; 32 (16.4 overs)	v	Thailand; 34/0 (4.4 overs)
Khin Myat 7 (14); Chanida Sutthiruang 3/9 (3 overs)		Nannapat Koncharoenkai 21* (18)

Thailand won by 10 wickets
Bayuemas Oval, Pandamaran
Umpires: Saleema Imtiaz (Pak) and Shathira Jakir (Ban)
Player of the match: Chanida Sutthiruang (Tha)

- Thailand won the toss and elected to field.

Match 5
10 February 2024
13:30 UTC+8
Scorecard

Singapore; 89/6 (20 overs)	v	Kuwait; 92/0 (13.4 overs)
Diviya G K 38* (47); Mariamma Hyder 3/7 (4 overs)		Zeefa Jilani 49* (51)

Kuwait won by 10 wickets
Bayuemas Oval, Pandamaran
Umpires: Shathira Jakir (Ban) and Ramasamy Venkatesh (HK)
Player of the match: Zeefa Jilani (Kuw)

- Singapore won the toss and elected to bat.

Match 9
11 February 2024
09:30 UTC+8
Scorecard

Thailand; 177/2 (20 overs)	v	Kuwait; 81/9 (20 overs)
Naruemol Chaiwai 83* (64)		Zeefa Jilani 25 (30); Nattaya Boochatham 2/12 (4 overs)

Thailand won by 96 runs
UKM-YSD Cricket Oval, Bangi
Umpires: Shivani Mishra (Qat) and Loganathan Poobalan (Mas)
Player of the match: Naruemol Chaiwai (Tha)

- Kuwait won the toss and elected field.

Match 13
11 February 2024
13:30 UTC+8
Scorecard

Singapore; 87/8 (20 overs)	v	Myanmar; 88/5 (14.3 overs)
Ada Bhasin 24 (42); Zin Kyaw 3/17 (4 overs)		Khin Myat 28 (29); Diviya G K 2/11 (4 overs)

Myanmar won by 5 wickets
UKM-YSD Cricket Oval, Bangi
Umpires: Loganathan Poobalan (Mas) and Ram Yadav (Nep)
Player of the match: Zin Kyaw (Mya)

- Singapore won the toss and elected to bat.

Match 17
13 February 2024
09:30 UTC+8
Scorecard

Kuwait; 125/8 (20 overs)	v	Myanmar; 98/8 (20 overs)
Zeefa Jilani 27 (27); Shwe Yee Win 4/18 (4 overs)		Theint Soe 29 (42); Zeefa Jilani 2/14 (4 overs)

Kuwait won by 27 runs
Royal Selangor Club, Kuala Lumpur
Umpires: Aasif Iqbal (UAE) and Shivani Mishra (Qat)
Player of the match: Zeefa Jilani (Kuw)

- Myanmar won the toss and elected to field.

Match 21
13 February 2024
13:30 UTC+8
Scorecard

Thailand; 162/5 (20 overs)	v	Singapore; 76 (18.5 overs)
Suwanan Khiaoto 74 (58); Diviya G K 2/35 (4 overs)		Vinu Kumar 21 (42); Chayanisa Phengpaen 3/14 (3.5 overs)

Thailand won by 86 runs
Royal Selangor Club, Kuala Lumpur
Umpires: Aasif Iqbal (UAE) and Gayathri Venugopalan (Ind)
Player of the match: Suwanan Khiaoto (Tha)

- Thailand won the toss and elected to bat.
- Chayanisa Phengpaen (Tha) made her T20I debut.

=== Group B ===
Group B standings
Pos	Team	Pld	W	L	NR	Pts	NRR	Qualification
1	United Arab Emirates	3	3	0	0	6	5.751	Advanced to the knockout stage
2	Japan	3	2	1	0	4	−0.462	Advanced to the knockout stage
3	China	3	1	2	0	2	−1.756	Eliminated
4	Oman	3	0	3	0	0	−3.510	Eliminated

Source: ESPNcricinfo

Match 2
10 February 2024
09:30 UTC+8
Scorecard

United Arab Emirates; 155/1 (20 overs)	v	China; 34 (17.5 overs)
Kavisha Egodage 69* (61); Mingyue Zhu 1/30 (4 overs)		Han Lili 11 (25); Kavisha Egodage 3/3 (3 overs)

United Arab Emirates won by 121 runs
UKM-YSD Cricket Oval, Bangi
Umpires: Nimali Perera (SL) and Zahid Usman (Kuw)
Player of the match: Kavisha Egodage (UAE)

- United Arab Emirates won the toss and elected to bat.
- Zhi Xin Yu (Chn) and Mehak Thakur (UAE) both made their T20I debuts.

Match 6
10 February 2024
13:30 UTC+8
Scorecard

Japan; 130/4 (20 overs)	v	Oman; 116/5 (20 overs)
Mai Yanagida 64* (57); Alifiya Sayed 1/28 (4 overs)		Nitya Joshi 43 (53); Shimako Kato 2/12 (4 overs)

Japan won by 14 runs
UKM-YSD Cricket Oval, Bangi
Umpires: Shivani Mishra (Qat) and Zahid Usman (Kuw)
Player of the match: Mai Yanagida (Jpn)

- Japan won the toss and elected to bat.
- Akshadha Gunasekar, Nitya Joshi, Trupti Pawde, Shreya Prabhu and Cynthia Saldanha (Oma) all made their T20I debuts.

Match 10
11 February 2024
09:30 UTC+8
Scorecard

United Arab Emirates; 176/1 (20 overs)	v	Oman; 28 (13 overs)
Esha Oza 114* (69); Amanda Dcosta 1/36 (4 overs)		Sakshi Shetty 8 (4); Suraksha Kotte 3/9 (3 overs)

United Arab Emirates won by 148 runs
Royal Selangor Club, Kuala Lumpur
Umpires: Nur Hijrah (Mas) and Zahid Usman (Kuw)
Player of the match: Esha Oza (UAE)

- Oman won the toss and elected to field.

Match 14
11 February 2024
13:30 UTC+8
Scorecard

China; 75 (19.5 overs)	v	Japan; 76/6 (18.3 overs)
Han Lili 29 (41); Ahilya Chandel 4/8 (2.5 overs)		Erika Oda 31 (26); Mengting Liu 3/15 (4 overs)

Japan won by 4 wickets
Royal Selangor Club, Kuala Lumpur
Umpires: Zahid Usman (Kuw) and Ramasamy Venkatesh (HK)
Player of the match: Ahilya Chandel (Jpn)

- China won the toss and elected to bat.
- Yang Yu Xuan (Chn) made her T20I debut.
- Ahilya Chandel became the first Japanese player to take a hat-trick in WT20Is.

Match 18
13 February 2024
09:30 UTC+8
Scorecard

Oman; 56 (19.4 overs)	v	China; 59/2 (13.2 overs)
Sakshi Shetty 13 (17); Xu Qian 3/5 (4 overs)		Sun Meng Yao 32 (43); Sushma Shetty 1/3 (1 over)

China won by 8 wickets
Selangor Turf Club, Kuala Lumpur
Umpires: Nur Hijrah (Mas) and Nimali Perera (SL)
Player of the match: Xu Qian (Chn)

- China won the toss and elected to field.
- Sahana Jeelany and Sushama Shetty (Oma) both made their T20I debuts.

Match 22
13 February 2024
13:30 UTC+8
Scorecard

Japan; 67/7 (20 overs)	v	United Arab Emirates; 68/0 (10.3 overs)
Erika Oda 17 (30); Vaishnave Mahesh 3/16 (4 overs)		Kavisha Egodage 34* (32)

United Arab Emirates won by 10 wickets
Selangor Turf Club, Kuala Lumpur
Umpires: Nur Hijrah (Mas) and Ramasamy Venkatesh (HK)
Player of the match: Kavisha Egodage (UAE)

- Japan won the toss and elected to bat.

=== Group C ===
Group C standings
Pos	Team	Pld	W	L	NR	Pts	NRR	Qualification
1	Malaysia (H)	3	3	0	0	6	3.006	Advanced to the knockout stage
2	Indonesia	3	2	1	0	4	2.080	Advanced to the knockout stage
3	Qatar	3	1	2	0	2	−0.602	Eliminated
4	Bahrain	3	0	3	0	0	−4.872	Eliminated

Source: ESPNcricinfo
(H) Hosts

Match 3
10 February 2024
09:30 UTC+8
Scorecard

Indonesia; 80/7 (20 overs)	v	Malaysia; 81/4 (17.5 overs)
Ni Luh Dewi 38 (47); Mas Elysa 2/7 (4 overs)		Mas Elysa 35* (53); Ni Made Putri Suwandewi 2/23 (3.5 overs)

Malaysia won by 6 wickets
Royal Selangor Club, Kuala Lumpur
Umpires: Aasif Iqbal (UAE) and Ram Yadav (Nep)
Player of the match: Mas Elysa (Mas)

- Malaysia won the toss and elected to field.
- Desi Wulandari (Idn) made her T20I debut.

Match 7
10 February 2024
13:30 UTC+8
Scorecard

Bahrain; 61 (17.1 overs)	v	Qatar; 62/3 (9.5 overs)
Deepika Rasangika 18 (13); Sabeeja Panayan 4/13 (4 overs)		Aysha 27 (17); Deepika Rasangika 1/7 (1 overs)

Qatar won by 7 wickets
Royal Selangor Club, Kuala Lumpur
Umpires: Aasif Iqbal (UAE) and Shriya Kumari (Sin)
Player of the match: Aysha (Qat)

- Bahrain won the toss and elected to bat.
- Sana Butt (Bhr), Krishna Bhuva and Taful Elkhair (Qat) all made their T20I debuts.

Match 11
11 February 2024
09:30 UTC+8
Scorecard

Indonesia; 129/5 (20 overs)	v	Bahrain; 41 (16.3 overs)
Ni Putu Ayu Nanda Sakarini 71* (63); Tharanga Gajanayake 2/21 (4 overs)		Deepika Rasangika 18 (32); Ni Wayan Sariani 3/4 (2.3 overs)

Indonesia won by 88 runs
Selangor Turf Club, Kuala Lumpur
Umpires: Saleema Imtiaz (Pak) and Aasif Iqbal (UAE)
Player of the match: Ni Putu Ayu Nanda Sakarini (Idn)

- Indonesia won the toss and elected to bat.

Match 15
11 February 2024
13:30 UTC+8
Scorecard

Malaysia; 115/9 (20 overs)	v	Qatar; 76 (19.4 overs)
Mas Elysa 23 (23); Sudha Thapa 3/18 (4 overs)		Angeline Mare 36 (46); Nur Dania Syuhada 2/21 (4 overs)

Malaysia won by 39 runs
Selangor Turf Club, Kuala Lumpur
Umpires: Saleema Imtiaz (Pak) and Aasif Iqbal (UAE)
Player of the match: Mas Elysa (Mas)

- Qatar won the toss and elected to field.

Match 19
13 February 2024
09:30 UTC+8
Scorecard

Malaysia; 188/3 (20 overs)	v	Bahrain; 62 (17 overs)
Elsa Hunter 68 (46); Pavithra Shetty 2/37 (4 overs)		Deepika Rasangika 43* (50); Mahirah Izzati Ismail 5/11 (4 overs)

Malaysia won by 126 runs
Bayuemas Oval, Pandamaran
Umpires: Zahid Usman (Kuw) and Ram Yadav (Nep)
Player of the match: Mahirah Izzati Ismail (Mas)

- Bahrain won toss and elected to field.
- Durriya Malik and Nishma Pereira (Bhr) both made their T20I debuts.

Match 23
13 February 2024
13:30 UTC+8
Scorecard

Qatar; 67/9 (20 overs)	v	Indonesia; 70/1 (12.1 overs)
Khadija Imitaz 15 (26); Ni Wayan Sariani 3/7 (4 overs)		Ni Luh Dewi 34* (38); Saachi Dhadwal 1/6 (3 overs)

Indonesia won by 9 wickets
Bayuemas Oval, Pandamaran
Umpires: Saleema Imtiaz (Pak) and Zahid Usman (Kuw)
Player of the match: Ni Luh Dewi (Idn)

- Indonesia won the toss and elected to field.

=== Group D ===
Group D standings
Pos	Team	Pld	W	L	NR	Pts	NRR	Qualification
1	Nepal	3	3	0	0	6	5.585	Advanced to the knockout stage
2	Hong Kong	3	2	1	0	4	3.615	Advanced to the knockout stage
3	Bhutan	3	1	2	0	2	−0.322	Eliminated
4	Maldives	3	0	3	0	0	−8.000	Eliminated

Source: ESPNcricinfo

Match 4
10 February 2024
09:30 UTC+8
Scorecard

Hong Kong; 93/8 (20 overs)	v	Nepal; 95/2 (14.1 overs)
Kary Chan 21 (31); Rubina Chhetry 2/15 (4 overs)		Indu Barma 40 (33); Iqra Sahar 1/9 (2 overs)

Nepal won by 8 wickets
Selangor Turf Club, Kuala Lumpur
Umpires: Loganathan Poobalan (Mas) and Gayathri Venugopalan (Ind)
Player of the match: Sita Rana Magar (Nep)

- Nepal won the toss and elected to field.

Match 8
10 February 2024
13:30 UTC+8
Scorecard

Bhutan; 124/8 (20 overs)	v	Maldives; 30 (18.1 overs)
Dechen Wangmo 36 (35); Nabba Naseem 3/23 (4 overs)		Sumayya Abdul 15 (56); Ngwang Choden 3/5 (4 overs)

Bhutan won by 94 runs
Selangor Turf Club, Kuala Lumpur
Umpires: Nur Hijrah (Mas) and Loganathan Poobalan (Mas)
Player of the match: Anju Gurung (Bhu)

- Maldives won the toss and elected to field.
- Eva Yangzom (Bhu), Fathimath Anaal, Fathimath Malha, Nabaa Naseem, Aishath Meesa Rameez and Hawwa Shaaiqa (Mdv) all made their T20I debuts.

Match 12
11 February 2024
09:30 UTC+8
Scorecard

Bhutan; 65/4 (20 overs)	v	Nepal; 66/2 (11.5 overs)
Ngawang Choden 25 (50); Kabita Kunwar 1/7 (4 overs)		Sita Rana Magar 32* (37); Anju Gurung 1/9 (2 overs); Anjuli Ghalley 1/9 (2 overs)

Nepal won by 8 wickets
Bayuemas Oval, Pandamaran
Umpires: Shathira Jakir (Ban) and Nimali Perera (SL)
Player of the match: Sita Rana Magar (Nep)

- Nepal won the toss and elected to field.

Match 16
11 February 2024
13:30 UTC+8
Scorecard

Hong Kong; 222/1 (20 overs)	v	Maldives; 50 (15.4 overs)
Mariko Hill 100* (65); Nabaa Naseem 1/40 (4 overs)		Latsha Haleemath 17 (15); Kary Chan 4/5 (2.4 overs)

Hong Kong won by 172 runs
Bayuemas Oval, Pandamaran
Umpires: Nimali Perera (SL) and Gayathri Venugopalan (Ind)
Player of the match: Kary Chan (HK)

- Hong Kong won the toss and elected to bat.
- Hawwa Ifasha and Leen Luthufee (Mdv) both made their T20I debuts.
- Mariko Hill became the first Hong Kong player to score a century in WT20Is.

Match 20
13 February 2024
09:30 UTC+8
Scorecard

Hong Kong; 160/3 (20 overs)	v	Bhutan; 88/7 (20 overs)
Kary Chan 69* (60); Yeshey Choden 2/26 (3 overs)		Karma Dena 33* (41); Alison Siu 2/14 (4 overs)

Hong Kong won by 72 runs
UKM-YSD Cricket Oval, Bangi
Umpires: Shathira Jakir (Ban) and Loganathan Poobalan (Mas)
Player of the match: Kary Chan (HK)

- Hong Kong won the toss and elected to bat.

Match 24
13 February 2024
13:30 UTC+8
Scorecard

Nepal; 227/4 (20 overs)	v	Maldives; 13 (13.5 overs)
Rubina Chhetry 118* (59); Shamma Ali 3/44 (4 overs)		Sumayya Abdul 5 (6); Asmina Karmacharya 4/7 (4 overs)

Nepal won by 214 runs
UKM-YSD Cricket Oval, Bangi
Umpires: Shathira Jakir (Ban) and Loganathan Poobalan (Mas)
Player of the match: Rubina Chhetry (Nep)

- Nepal won the toss and elected to bat.
- Rubina Chhetry became the first Nepalese player to score a century in WT20Is.
- This was Nepal's highest innings total in WT20Is.

== Knockout stage ==
The knockout stage consisted of four quarter-finals played on 14 February, two semi-finals played on 16 February, and a final played on 18 February. The top four teams (winners of the quarter-finals / semi-finalists): the United Arab Emirates, Malaysia, Thailand and Nepal qualified for the 2024 Women's Twenty20 Asia Cup.

=== Bracket ===
Quarter-finals
A1	Thailand	93/7 (19.1 overs)
D2	Hong Kong	92/8 (20 overs)
B1	United Arab Emirates	122/6 (20 overs)
C2	Indonesia	66/6 (20 overs)
C1	Malaysia	101/3 (20 overs)
B2	Japan	85/7 (20 overs)
D1	Nepal	50/2 (6.5 overs)
A2	Kuwait	73/9 (20 overs)

Semi-finals
QF1W	Thailand	66 (19.2 overs)
QF2W	United Arab Emirates	70/7 (20 overs)
QF3W	Malaysia	116/6 (19.5 overs)
QF4W	Nepal	115/6 (20 overs)

Final
SF1W	United Arab Emirates	103/5 (20 overs)
SF2W	Malaysia	68/9 (20 overs)

=== Quarter-finals ===
Quarter-final 1
14 February 2024
09:30 UTC+8
Scorecard

Hong Kong; 92/8 (20 overs)	v	Thailand; 93/7 (19.1 overs)
Yasmin Daswani 26 (35); Nattaya Boochatham 3/12 (4 overs)		Nattaya Boochatham 29 (29); Kary Chan 3/12 (4 overs)

Thailand won by 3 wickets
Bayuemas Oval, Pandamaran
Umpires: Aasif Iqbal (UAE) and Nimali Perera (SL)
Player of the match: Nattaya Boochatham (Tha)

- Thailand won the toss and elected to field.

Quarter-final 2
14 February 2024
09:30 UTC+8
Scorecard

United Arab Emirates; 122/6 (20 overs)	v	Indonesia; 66/6 (20 overs)
Samaira Dharnidharka 31* (28); Ni Wayan Sariani 2/19 (4 overs)		Rahmawati Pangestuti 15* (29); Heena Hotchandani 3/9 (4 overs)

United Arab Emirates won by 56 runs
UKM-YSD Cricket Oval, Bangi
Umpires: Shathira Jakir (Ban) and Saleema Imtiaz (Pak)
Player of the match: Heena Hotchandani (UAE)

- United Arab Emirates won the toss and elected to bat.
- Heena Hotchandani (UAE) took her maiden hat-trick in WT20Is.

Quarter-final 3
14 February 2024
13:30 UTC+8
Scorecard

Malaysia; 101/3 (20 overs)	v	Japan; 85/7 (20 overs)
Winifred Duraisingam 48* (64); Nonoha Yasumoto 1/8 (3 overs)		Mai Yanagida 37 (34); Mas Elysa 3/14 (3.5 overs)

Malaysia won by 16 runs
Bayuemas Oval, Pandamaran
Umpires: Aasif Iqbal (UAE) and Shivani Mishra (Qat)
Player of the match: Mas Elysa (Mas)

- Malaysia won the toss and elected to bat.

Quarter-final 4
14 February 2024
13:30 UTC+8
Scorecard

Kuwait; 73/9 (20 overs)	v	Nepal; 50/2 (6.5 overs)
Priyada Murali 29 (33); Sita Rana Magar 3/11 (4 overs)		Indu Barma 22* (21); Maryam Omar 1/11 (1.5 overs)

Nepal won by 8 wickets (DLS method)
UKM-YSD Cricket Oval, Bangi
Umpires: Nur Hijrah (Mas) and Saleema Imtiaz (Pak)
Player of the match: Sita Rana Magar (Nep)

- Kuwait won the toss and elected to bat.
- Nepal were set a revised target of 50 runs from 12 overs due to rain.
- Sita Rana Magar (Nep) took her maiden hat-trick in WT20Is.

=== Semi-finals ===
Semi-final 1
16 February 2024
09:30 UTC+8
Scorecard

United Arab Emirates; 70/7 (20 overs)	v	Thailand; 66 (19.2 overs)
Kavisha Egodage 21 (41); Thipatcha Putthawong 2/12 (4 overs)		Thipatcha Putthawong 21 (27); Heena Hotchandani 4/8 (4 overs)

United Arab Emirates won by 4 runs
Bayuemas Oval, Pandamaran
Umpires: Nur Hijrah (Mas) and Gayathri Venugopalan (Ind)
Player of the match: Heena Hotchandani (UAE)

- United Arab Emirates won the toss and elected to bat.

Semi-final 2
16 February 2024
13:30 UTC+8
Scorecard

Nepal; 115/6 (20 overs)	v	Malaysia; 116/6 (19.5 overs)
Indu Barma 29 (37); Mahirah Izzati Ismail 2/10 (4 overs)		Elsa Hunter 69* (53); Kabita Joshi 2/17 (3 overs)

Malaysia won by 4 wickets
Bayuemas Oval, Pandamaran
Umpires: Aasif Iqbal (UAE) and Nimali Perera (SL)
Player of the match: Elsa Hunter (Mas)

- Nepal won the toss and elected to bat.

=== Final ===
Final
18 February 2024
09:30 UTC+8
Scorecard

United Arab Emirates; 105/3 (20 overs)	v	Malaysia; 68/9 (20 overs)
Esha Oza 53 (51); Ainna Hamizah Hashim 2/15 (4 overs)		Nur Dania Syuhada 16* (21); Vaishnave Mahesh 2/15 (4 overs)

United Arab Emirates won by 37 runs
Bayuemas Oval, Pandamaran
Umpires: Nimali Perera (SL) and Gayathri Venugopalan (Ind)
Player of the match: Esha Oza (UAE)

- United Arab Emirates won the toss and elected to bat.

== See also ==
- International cricket in 2023–24
- Associate international cricket in 2023–24
- 2024 ACC Men's Challenger Cup
- 2024 ACC Men's Premier Cup
- International cricket in 2024
- Associate international cricket in 2024
