= Myanmar women's national cricket team =

Cricket team

Myanmar
- Flag of Myanmar
- Association: Myanmar Cricket Federation

International Cricket Council
- ICC status: Associate member (2017); Affiliate member (2006)
- ICC region: Asia
| ICC Rankings | Current | Best-ever |
| T20I | 36th | 29th (24 Apr 2019) |

T20 Internationals
- First T20I: v. Thailand at Terdthai Cricket Ground, Bangkok; 12 January 2019
- Last T20I: v. Mongolia at UKM-YSD Cricket Oval, Bangi; 9 June 2026
| T20Is | Played | Won/Lost |
| Total | 57 | 31/26 (0 ties, 1 no result) |
| This year | 6 | 3/3 (0 ties, 0 no results) |
T20I kit
- As of 9 June 2026

The Myanmar national women's cricket team represents Myanmar in international women's cricket. They made their international debut in Thailand's World T20 smash in Thailand in January 2019.

In April 2018, the International Cricket Council (ICC) granted full Women's Twenty20 International (WT20I) status to all its members. Therefore, all Twenty20 matches played between Myanmar women and other ICC members after 1 July 2018 have the full WT20I status.

== Records and statistics ==
International Match Summary — Myanmar Women

Last updated 9 June 2026

Playing Record
| Format | M | W | L | T | NR | Inaugural Match |
| Twenty20 Internationals | 57 | 31 | 25 | 0 | 1 | 12 January 2019 |

=== Twenty20 International ===
- Highest team total: 135/7 v. Singapore on 19 April 2019 at Indian Association Ground, Singapore.
- Highest individual score: 57, Khin Myat v. Singapore on 19 April 2019 at Indian Association Ground, Singapore.
- Best individual bowling figures: 6/10, Zon Lin v. Indonesia on 13 January 2019 at Asian Institute of Technology Ground, Bangkok.

Most T20I runs for Myanmar Women

| Player | Runs | Average | Career span |
|---|---|---|---|
| Zon Lin | 843 | 20.56 | 2019–2026 |
| Khin Myat | 678 | 16.95 | 2019–2026 |
| Theint Soe | 480 | 10.66 | 2019–2026 |
| Thae Thae Aung | 360 | 12.00 | 2019–2026 |
| May San | 323 | 8.07 | 2019–2026 |

Most T20I wickets for Myanmar Women

| Player | Wickets | Average | Career span |
|---|---|---|---|
| Theint Soe | 47 | 15.14 | 2019–2026 |
| Zar Win | 38 | 15.89 | 2019–2026 |
| Zon Lin | 36 | 15.50 | 2019–2026 |
| Lin Htun | 34 | 18.32 | 2019–2026 |
| May San | 23 | 19.30 | 2019–2026 |

T20I record versus other nations

Records complete to WT20I #2833. Last updated 9 June 2026.

| Opponent | M | W | L | T | NR | First match | First win |
|---|---|---|---|---|---|---|---|
vs Associate Members
| Bahrain | 1 | 1 | 0 | 0 | 0 | 3 June 2026 | 3 June 2026 |
| Bhutan | 6 | 6 | 0 | 0 | 0 | 15 January 2019 | 15 January 2019 |
| China | 3 | 1 | 2 | 0 | 0 | 4 September 2023 | 22 September 2025 |
| Hong Kong | 6 | 1 | 5 | 0 | 0 | 16 January 2019 | 7 November 2024 |
| Indonesia | 4 | 0 | 4 | 0 | 0 | 13 January 2019 | |
| Japan | 1 | 0 | 1 | 0 | 0 | 6 June 2026 | |
| Kuwait | 8 | 3 | 5 | 0 | 0 | 6 September 2023 | 25 October 2024 |
| Malaysia | 3 | 1 | 2 | 0 | 0 | 18 January 2019 | 18 January 2019 |
| Mongolia | 4 | 4 | 0 | 0 | 0 | 8 November 2024 | 8 November 2024 |
| Philippines | 1 | 1 | 0 | 0 | 0 | 11 May 2023 | 11 May 2023 |
| Singapore | 14 | 13 | 0 | 0 | 1 | 18 April 2019 | 18 April 2019 |
| Thailand | 6 | 0 | 6 | 0 | 0 | 12 January 2019 | |

== Tournament history ==
=== Women's World Cup ===
World Cup record
| Year | Round | Position | GP | W | L | T | NR |
|---|---|---|---|---|---|---|---|
| (England) 1973 | Did not qualify/No women's ODI status | | | | | | |
| (India) 1978 | Did not qualify/No women's ODI status | | | | | | |
| (New Zealand) 1982 | Did not qualify/No women's ODI status | | | | | | |
| (Australia) 1988 | Did not qualify/No women's ODI status | | | | | | |
| (England) 1993 | Did not qualify/No women's ODI status | | | | | | |
| (India) 1997 | Did not qualify/No women's ODI status | | | | | | |
| (New Zealand) 2000 | Did not qualify/No women's ODI status | | | | | | |
| (South Africa) 2005 | Did not qualify/No women's ODI status | | | | | | |
| (Australia) 2009 | Did not qualify/No women's ODI status | | | | | | |
| (India) 2013 | Did not qualify/No women's ODI status | | | | | | |
| (England) 2017 | Did not qualify/No women's ODI status | | | | | | |
| (New Zealand) 2022 | Did not qualify/No women's ODI status | | | | | | |
| (India) 2025 | To be determined | | | | | | |
| Total | 0/12 | 0 Titles | 0 | 0 | 0 | 0 | 0 |

=== Women's World T20 ===
Twenty20 World Cup Record
| Year | Round | Position | GP | W | L | T | NR |
|---|---|---|---|---|---|---|---|
| (England) 2009 | Did not qualify | | | | | | |
| (Cricket West Indies) 2010 | Did not qualify | | | | | | |
| (Sri Lanka) 2012 | Did not qualify | | | | | | |
| (Bangladesh) 2014 | Did not qualify | | | | | | |
| (India) 2016 | Did not qualify | | | | | | |
| (Cricket West Indies) 2018 | Did not qualify | | | | | | |
| (Australia) 2020 | Did not qualify | | | | | | |
| (South Africa) 2023 | Did not qualify | | | | | | |
| (Bangladesh) 2024 | Did not qualify | | | | | | |
| Total | 0/8 | 0 Titles | 0 | 0 | 0 | 0 | 0 |

=== ICC Women's T20 World Cup Qualifier ===
ICC Women's World Twenty20 Qualifier record
| Year | Round | Position | GP | W | L | T | NR |
|---|---|---|---|---|---|---|---|
| (Republic of Ireland) 2013 | Did not qualify | | | | | | |
| (Thailand) 2015 | Did not qualify | | | | | | |
| (Netherlands) 2018 | Did not qualify | | | | | | |
| (Scotland) 2019 | Did not qualify | | | | | | |
| (United Arab Emirates) 2022 | Did not qualify | | | | | | |
| (United Arab Emirates) 2024 | Did not qualify | | | | | | |
| Total | 0/6 | 0 Titles | 0 | 0 | 0 | 0 | 0 |

=== ICC Women's World Twenty20 Asia Qualifier ===
ICC Women's World Twenty20 Asia Qualifier record
| Year | Round | Position | GP | W | L | T | NR |
|---|---|---|---|---|---|---|---|
| (Thailand) 2017 | Did not qualify | | | | | | |
| (Thailand) 2019 | Did not qualify | | | | | | |
| (United Arab Emirates) 2021 | Did not qualify | | | | | | |
| (Malaysia) 2023 | Did not qualify | | | | | | |
| Total | 0/4 | 0 Titles | 0 | 0 | 0 | 0 | 0 |

=== Women's Asia Cup ===
Women's Asia Cup Record
| Year | Round | Position | GP | W | L | T | NR |
|---|---|---|---|---|---|---|---|
| 2004 (Sri Lanka) | Did not enter (ODI format) | | | | | | |
| 2005-06 (Pakistan) | Did not enter (ODI format) | | | | | | |
| 2006 (India) | Did not enter (ODI format) | | | | | | |
| 2008 (Sri Lanka) | Did not enter (ODI format) | | | | | | |
| 2012 (China) | Did not qualify | | | | | | |
| 2016 (Thailand) | Did not qualify | | | | | | |
| 2018 (Malaysia) | Did not qualify | | | | | | |
| 2022 (Bangladesh) | Did not qualify | | | | | | |
| 2024 (Sri Lanka) | Did not qualify | | | | | | |
| Total | 0/9 | - | 0 | 0 | 0 | 0 | 0 |

=== ACC Women's Premier Cup ===
ACC Women's Premier Cup Record
| Year | Round | Position | GP | W | L | T | NR |
|---|---|---|---|---|---|---|---|
| 2024 (Malaysia) | Group stages | - | 3 | 1 | 2 | 0 | 0 |
| Total | 1/1 | 0 Titles | 3 | 1 | 2 | 0 | 0 |

== See also ==
- List of Myanmar women Twenty20 International cricketers
