= Aphisara Suwanchonrathi =

Thai cricketer (born 2007)

Personal information
- Born: 29 March 2007 (age 19); Chiang Mai, Thailand
- Batting: Right-handed
- Bowling: Right arm medium
- Role: Batter

International information
- National side: Thailand
- Only ODI (cap 16): 10 April 2025 v Bangladesh
- T20I debut (cap 21): 6 October 2022 v Pakistan
- Last T20I: 24 July 2024 v Sri Lanka
Medal record
Representing Thailand
Women's Cricket
Southeast Asian Games
Gold medal – first place	2023 Cambodia	Twenty10
Gold medal – first place	2023 Cambodia	Twenty20
Gold medal – first place	2023 Cambodia	50 overs
- Source: Cricinfo, 8 October 2024

Aphisara Suwanchonrathi (Thai:อภิสรา สุวรรณชลธี, born 29 March 2007) is a Thai cricketer. She was a part of Thai team in 2022 Women's Asia Cup and made her T20I debut against Pakistan.

In January 2024, she was selected to play for Thailand in ACC Women's Premier Cup.

Suwanchonrathi was part of the Thailand squad for the 2025 Women's Cricket World Cup Qualifier in Pakistan in April 2025.
