= 2022 Women's Twenty20 Asia Cup =

International cricket tournament

- Dates: 1 – 15 October 2022
- Administrator: Asian Cricket Council
- Cricket format: WT20I
- Tournament format(s): Round-robin and knockouts
- Host: Bangladesh
- Champions: India (7th title)
- Runners-up: Sri Lanka
- Participants: 7
- Matches: 24
- Player of the series: (India) Deepti Sharma
- Most runs: (India) Jemimah Rodrigues (217)
- Most wickets: (India) Deepti Sharma (13) (Sri Lanka) Inoka Ranaweera (13)

The 2022 Women's Twenty20 Asia Cup was the eighth edition of the Women's Asia Cup tournament which took place from 1 to 15 October 2022 in Sylhet, Bangladesh. The tournament was contested by Bangladesh, India, Malaysia, Pakistan, Sri Lanka, Thailand and United Arab Emirates. On 20 September 2022, the Asian Cricket Council (ACC) announced the schedule of the tournament. Bangladesh were the defending champions, having defeated India by three wickets in the final of the 2018 tournament to win the title for the first time. The tournament was played at the Sylhet International Cricket Stadium. The seven teams played in a round-robin stage, with the top four progressing to the semi-finals.

The UAE and Malaysia had qualified for the tournament by reaching the final of the 2022 ACC Women's T20 Championship, which was played in June 2022 in Malaysia.

In the round-robin stage, Thailand beat Pakistan by 4 wickets to register their first ever WT20I victory against their opponents. Combined with a rain-out for the match between Bangladesh and the UAE, this led to Thailand qualifying for the semifinals, their best ever Asia Cup result.

== Teams and qualifications ==
Means of qualification	Date	Host	Berths	Qualified
ICC Women's; T20I Rankings	—N/a	—N/a	5	Bangladesh; India; Pakistan; Sri Lanka; Thailand
Qualifier	June 2022	Malaysia	2	United Arab Emirates; Malaysia
Total			7	

== Squads ==
The following squads were announced for the tournament.

Bangladesh	India	Malaysia	Pakistan	Sri Lanka	Thailand	United Arab Emirates
Nigar Sultana (c, wk); Rumana Ahmed; Nahida Akter; Shohely Akhter; Jahanara Alam; Fargana Hoque; Fahima Khatun; Murshida Khatun; Salma Khatun; Sanjida Akter Meghla; Lata Mondal; Ritu Moni; Sobhana Mostary; Shamima Sultana (wk); Fariha Trisna	Harmanpreet Kaur (c); Smriti Mandhana (vc); Rajeshwari Gayakwad; Richa Ghosh (wk); Dayalan Hemalatha; Sabbhineni Meghana; Kiran Navgire; Sneh Rana; Jemimah Rodrigues; Meghna Singh; Renuka Singh Thakur; Deepti Sharma; Pooja Vastrakar; Shafali Verma; Radha Yadav	Winifred Duraisingam (c); Mas Elysa (vc); Sasha Azmi; Aisya Eleesa; Ainna Hamizah Hashim; Elsa Hunter; Jamahidaya Intan; Mahirah Izzati Ismail; Wan Julia (wk); Dhanusri Muhunan; Aina Najwa (wk); Nurilyaa Natasya; Nur Arianna Natsya; Nur Dania Syuhada; Noor Hayati Zakaria	Bismah Maroof (c); Muneeba Ali (wk); Sidra Ameen; Aiman Anwer; Diana Baig; Nida Dar; Tuba Hassan; Kainat Imtiaz; Sadia Iqbal; Ayesha Naseem; Sidra Nawaz; Aliya Riaz; ~~Fatima Sana~~; Nashra Sandhu; Sadaf Shamas; Omaima Sohail	Chamari Athapaththu (c); Nilakshi de Silva; Kavisha Dilhari; Achini Kulasuriya; Sugandika Kumari; Madushika Methtananda; Kaushini Nuthyangana (wk); Hasini Perera; Oshadi Ranasinghe; Inoka Ranaweera; Harshitha Samarawickrama; Anushka Sanjeewani (wk); Tharika Sewwandi; Malsha Shehani; Rashmi Silva	Naruemol Chaiwai (c); Nannapat Koncharoenkai (vc, wk); Nattaya Boochatham; Nanthita Boonsukham; Natthakan Chantam; Onnicha Kamchomphu; Rosenan Kanoh; Suwanan Khiaoto; Banthida Leephatthana; Suleeporn Laomi; Phannita Maya; Thipatcha Putthawong; Aphisara Suwanchonrathi; Chanida Sutthiruang; Sornnarin Tippoch	Chaya Mughal (c); Natasha Cherriath; Samaira Dharnidharka; Kavisha Egodage; Mahika Gaur; Siya Gokhale; Priyanjali Jain (wk); Lavanya Keny; Suraksha Kotte; Vaishnave Mahesh; Indhuja Nandakumar; Esha Oza; Rishitha Rajith; Theertha Satish (wk); Khushi Sharma

On 18 September 2022, Pakistan's Fatima Sana was ruled out of the tournament due to a twisted ankle, and was later replaced in the squad by Nashra Sandhu. India also named Simran Bahadur and Taniya Bhatia as standby players. Bangladesh named Sharmin Akhter, Marufa Akter, Rabeya Khan and Nuzhat Tasnia as standby players.

== Round-robin ==
=== Points table ===
Pos	Team	Pld	W	L	NR	Pts	NRR
1	India	6	5	1	0	10	3.141
2	Pakistan	6	5	1	0	10	1.806
3	Sri Lanka	6	4	2	0	8	0.888
4	Thailand	6	3	3	0	6	−0.949
5	Bangladesh (H)	6	2	3	1	5	0.423
6	United Arab Emirates	6	1	4	1	3	−2.181
7	Malaysia	6	0	6	0	0	−3.002

Source: ESPNcricinfo
(H) Host

Advanced to the semi-finals

=== Fixtures ===
1 October 2022
09:00
Scorecard

Thailand; 82 (19.4 overs)	v	Bangladesh; 88/1 (11.4 overs)
Phannita Maya 26 (22); Rumana Ahmed 3/9 (3 overs)		Shamima Sultana 49 (30); Thipatcha Putthawong 1/23 (4 overs)

Bangladesh won by 9 wickets
Sylhet International Cricket Stadium Academy Ground, Sylhet
Umpires: Humaira Farah (Pak) and Gayathri Venugopalan (Ind)
Player of the match: Shamima Sultana (Ban)

- Thailand won the toss and elected to bat.

1 October 2022
13:30
Scorecard

India; 150/6 (20 overs)	v	Sri Lanka; 109 (18.2 overs)
Jemimah Rodrigues 76 (53); Oshadi Ranasinghe 3/32 (4 overs)		Hasini Perera 30 (32); Dayalan Hemalatha 3/15 (2.2 overs)

India won by 41 runs
Sylhet International Cricket Stadium Academy Ground, Sylhet
Umpires: Nur Hijrah (Mas) and Saleema Imtiaz (Pak)
Player of the match: Jemimah Rodrigues (Ind)

- Sri Lanka won the toss and elected to field.

2 October 2022
09:00
Scorecard

Malaysia; 57/9 (20 overs)	v	Pakistan; 61/1 (9 overs)
Elsa Hunter 29* (51); Omaima Sohail 3/19 (3 overs)		Sidra Ameen 31 (23); Mahirah Izzati Ismail 1/8 (2 overs)

Pakistan won by 9 wickets
Sylhet International Cricket Stadium Academy Ground, Sylhet
Umpires: Nimali Perera (SL) and Hemangi Yerzal (UAE)
Player of the match: Tuba Hassan (Pak)

- Pakistan won the toss and elected to field.

2 October 2022
13:30
Scorecard

Sri Lanka; 109/9 (20 overs)	v	United Arab Emirates; 54/7 (11 overs)
Harshitha Samarawickrama 37 (40); Vaishnave Mahesh 3/15 (4 overs)		Theertha Satish 19 (19); Kavisha Dilhari 2/7 (2 overs)

Sri Lanka won by 11 runs (DLS)
Sylhet International Cricket Stadium Academy Ground, Sylhet
Umpires: Shivani Mishra (Qat) and Vrinda Rathi (Ind)
Player of the match: Harshitha Samarawickrama (SL)

- Sri Lanka won the toss and elected to bat.
- United Arab Emirates were set a revised target of 66 runs from 11 overs due to rain.
- Kaushini Nuthyangana (SL) made her WT20I debut.

3 October 2022
09:00
Scorecard

Bangladesh; 70/8 (20 overs)	v	Pakistan; 72/1 (12.2 overs)
Salma Khatun 24* (29); Diana Baig 2/11 (3 overs)		Sidra Ameen 36* (35); Salma Khatun 1/27 (4 overs)

Pakistan won by 9 wickets
Sylhet International Cricket Stadium Academy Ground, Sylhet
Umpires: Dedunu Silva (SL) and Gayathri Venugopalan (Ind)
Player of the match: Sidra Ameen (Pak)

- Pakistan won the toss and elected to field.

3 October 2022
13:30
Scorecard

India; 181/4 (20 overs)	v	Malaysia; 16/2 (5.2 overs)
Sabbhineni Meghana 69 (53); Nur Dania Syuhada 2/9 (1 over)		Mas Elysa 14* (17); Rajeshwari Gayakwad 1/6 (2 overs)

India won by 30 runs (DLS)
Sylhet International Cricket Stadium Academy Ground, Sylhet
Umpires: Nimali Perera (SL) and Hemangi Yerzal (UAE)
Player of the match: Sabbhineni Meghana (Ind)

- Malaysia won the toss and elected to field.
- No further play was possible due to rain.

4 October 2022
09:00
Scorecard

Sri Lanka; 156/5 (20 overs)	v	Thailand; 107/5 (20 overs)
Harshitha Samarawickrama 81 (69); Thipatcha Putthawong 2/26 (4 overs)		Chanida Sutthiruang 37* (42); Achini Kulasuriya 2/19 (3 overs)

Sri Lanka won by 49 runs
Sylhet International Cricket Stadium Academy Ground, Sylhet
Umpires: Nur Hijrah (Mas) and Vrinda Rathi (Ind)
Player of the match: Harshitha Samarawickrama (SL)

- Sri Lanka won the toss and elected to bat.

4 October 2022
13:30
Scorecard

India; 178/5 (20 overs)	v	United Arab Emirates; 74/4 (20 overs)
Jemimah Rodrigues 75* (45); Suraksha Kotte 1/14 (1 over)		Kavisha Egodage 30* (54); Rajeshwari Gayakwad 2/20 (3 overs)

India won by 104 runs
Sylhet International Cricket Stadium Academy Ground, Sylhet
Umpires: Humaira Farah (Pak) and Shivani Mishra (Qat)
Player of the match: Jemimah Rodrigues (Ind)

- India won the toss and elected to bat.

5 October 2022
13:30
Scorecard

Malaysia; 88/4 (20 overs)	v	United Arab Emirates; 91/3 (19.1 overs)
Winifred Duraisingam 33 (53); Indhuja Nandakumar 1/7 (2 overs)		Theertha Satish 62* (60); Sasha Azmi 1/7 (4 overs)

United Arab Emirates won by 7 wickets
Sylhet International Cricket Stadium Academy Ground, Sylhet
Umpires: Nimali Perera (SL) and Vrinda Rathi (Ind)
Player of the match: Theertha Satish (UAE)

- Malaysia won the toss and elected to bat.

6 October 2022
09:00
Scorecard

Pakistan; 116/5 (20 overs)	v	Thailand; 117/6 (19.5 overs)
Sidra Ameen 56 (64); Sornnarin Tippoch 2/20 (4 overs)		Natthakan Chantam 61 (51); Tuba Hassan 2/18 (4 overs)

Thailand won by 4 wickets
Sylhet International Cricket Stadium, Sylhet
Umpires: Nur Hijrah (Mas) and Gayathri Venugopalan (Ind)
Player of the match: Natthakan Chantam (Tha)

- Pakistan won the toss and elected to bat.
- Aphisara Suwanchonrathi (Tha) made her WT20I debut.

6 October 2022
13:30
Scorecard

Bangladesh; 129/5 (20 overs)	v	Malaysia; 41 (18.5 overs)
Murshida Khatun 56 (54); Sasha Azmi 1/15 (4 overs)		Nur Arianna Natsya 9 (12); Fariha Trisna 3/12 (3 overs)

Bangladesh won by 88 runs
Sylhet International Cricket Stadium, Sylhet
Umpires: Humaira Farah (Pak) and Nimali Perera (SL)
Player of the match: Nigar Sultana (Ban)

- Bangladesh won the toss and elected to bat.
- Fariha Trisna (Ban) made her WT20I debut.

7 October 2022
09:00
Scorecard

Thailand; 108/4 (20 overs)	v	United Arab Emirates; 89/8 (20 overs)
Naruemol Chaiwai 37* (52); Khushi Sharma 1/11 (3 overs)		Kavisha Egodage 29 (41); Thipatcha Putthawong 2/12 (4 overs)

Thailand won by 19 runs
Sylhet International Cricket Stadium, Sylhet
Umpires: Saleema Imtiaz (Pak) and Vrinda Rathi (Ind)
Player of the match: Thipatcha Putthawong (Tha)

- United Arab Emirates won the toss and elected to field.

7 October 2022
13:30
Scorecard

Pakistan; 137/6 (20 overs)	v	India; 124 (19.4 overs)
Nida Dar 56* (37); Deepti Sharma 3/27 (4 overs)		Richa Ghosh 26 (13); Nashra Sandhu 3/30 (4 overs)

Pakistan won by 13 runs
Sylhet International Cricket Stadium, Sylhet
Umpires: Dedunu Silva (SL) and Hemangi Yerzal (UAE)
Player of the match: Nida Dar (Pak)

- Pakistan won the toss and elected to bat.

8 October 2022
09:00
Scorecard

Sri Lanka; 107/5 (20 overs)	v	Malaysia; 33 (9.5 overs)
Oshadi Ranasinghe 23* (18); Sasha Azmi 2/10 (4 overs)		Elsa Hunter 18 (15); Malsha Shehani 4/2 (1.5 overs)

Sri Lanka won by 72 runs
Sylhet International Cricket Stadium, Sylhet
Umpires: Humaira Farah (Pak) and Gayathri Venugopalan (Ind)
Player of the match: Malsha Shehani (SL)

- Sri Lanka won the toss and elected to bat.

8 October 2022
13:30
Scorecard

India; 159/5 (20 overs)	v	Bangladesh; 100/7 (20 overs)
Shafali Verma 55 (44); Rumana Ahmed 3/27 (3 overs)		Nigar Sultana 36 (29); Shafali Verma 2/10 (4 overs)

India won by 59 runs
Sylhet International Cricket Stadium, Sylhet
Umpires: Saleema Imtiaz (Pak) and Nimali Perera (SL)
Player of the match: Shafali Verma (Ind)

- India won the toss and elected to bat.
- Shafali Verma (Ind) scored her 1000th run in WT20Is.

9 October 2022
09:00
Scorecard

Thailand; 115/5 (20 overs)	v	Malaysia; 65/8 (20 overs)
Nannapat Koncharoenkai 41 (45); Winifred Duraisingam 2/13 (3 overs)		Mahirah Izzati Ismail 17 (35); Thipatcha Putthawong 2/7 (4 overs)

Thailand won by 50 runs
Sylhet International Cricket Stadium, Sylhet
Umpires: Shivani Mishra (Qat) and Dedunu Silva (SL)
Player of the match: Nannapat Koncharoenkai (Tha)

- Malaysia won the toss and elected to field.
- Banthida Leephatthana (Tha) made her WT20I debut.

9 October 2022
13:30
Scorecard

Pakistan; 145/5 (20 overs)	v	United Arab Emirates; 74/5 (20 overs)
Aliya Riaz 57* (36); Esha Oza 3/22 (4 overs)		Khushi Sharma 20* (19); Aiman Anwer 1/10 (4 overs)

Pakistan won by 71 runs
Sylhet International Cricket Stadium, Sylhet
Umpires: Vrinda Rathi (Ind) and Gayathri Venugopalan (Ind)
Player of the match: Aliya Riaz (Pak)

- United Arab Emirates won the toss and elected to field.

10 October 2022
09:00
Scorecard

Sri Lanka; 83/5 (18.1 overs)	v	Bangladesh; 37/7 (7 overs)
Nilakshi de Silva 28* (31); Rumana Ahmed 2/14 (3 overs)		Nigar Sultana 12 (11); Inoka Ranaweera 4/7 (2 overs)

Sri Lanka won by 3 runs (DLS)
Sylhet International Cricket Stadium, Sylhet
Umpires: Saleema Imtiaz (Pak) and Vrinda Rathi (Ind)
Player of the match: Inoka Ranaweera (SL)

- Bangladesh won the toss and elected to field.
- Bangladesh were set a revised target of 41 runs from 7 overs due to rain.

10 October 2022
13:30
Scorecard

Thailand; 37 (15.1 overs)	v	India; 40/1 (6 overs)
Nannapat Koncharoenkai 12 (19); Sneh Rana 3/9 (4 overs)		Sabbhineni Meghana 20* (18); Nattaya Boochatham 1/15 (3 overs)

India won by 9 wickets
Sylhet International Cricket Stadium, Sylhet
Umpires: Nur Hijrah (Mas) and Dedunu Silva (SL)
Player of the match: Sneh Rana (Ind)

- India won the toss and elected to field.

11 October 2022
09:00
Scorecard

Bangladesh	v	United Arab Emirates

Match abandoned
Sylhet International Cricket Stadium, Sylhet
Umpires: Humaira Farah (Pak) and Gayathri Venugopalan (Ind)

- No toss.
- No play was possible due to rain.

11 October 2022
13:30
Scorecard

Sri Lanka; 112 (18.5 overs)	v	Pakistan; 113/5 (18.5 overs)
Chamari Athapaththu 41 (26); Omaima Sohail 5/13 (4 overs)		Nida Dar 26* (28); Kavisha Dilhari 2/16 (3 overs)

Pakistan won by 5 wickets
Sylhet International Cricket Stadium, Sylhet
Umpires: Shivani Mishra (Qat) and Hemangi Yerzal (UAE)
Player of the match: Omaima Sohail (Pak)

- Sri Lanka won the toss and elected to field.
- Omaima Sohail (Pak) took her first five-wicket haul in WT20Is.

== Play-offs ==
=== Bracket ===
Semi-finals
1	India	148/6 (20)
4	Thailand	74/9 (20)
3	Sri Lanka	122/6 (20)
2	Pakistan	121/6 (20)

Final
SF1	India	71/2 (8.3)
SF2	Sri Lanka	65/9 (20)

=== Semi-finals ===
13 October 2022
09:00
Scorecard

India; 148/6 (20 overs)	v	Thailand; 74/9 (20 overs)
Shafali Verma 42 (28); Sornnarin Tippoch 3/24 (4 overs)		Nattaya Boochatham 21 (29); Deepti Sharma 3/7 (4 overs)

India won by 74 runs
Sylhet International Cricket Stadium, Sylhet
Umpires: Saleema Imtiaz (Pak) and Dedunu Silva (SL)
Player of the match: Shafali Verma (Ind)

- Thailand won the toss and elected to field.

13 October 2022
13:30
Scorecard

Sri Lanka; 122/6 (20 overs)	v	Pakistan; 121/6 (20 overs)
Harshitha Samarawickrama 35 (41); Nashra Sandhu 3/17 (4 overs)		Bismah Maroof 42 (41); Inoka Ranaweera 2/17 (4 overs)

Sri Lanka won by 1 run
Sylhet International Cricket Stadium, Sylhet
Umpires: Vrinda Rathi (Ind) and Gayathri Venugopalan (Ind)
Player of the match: Inoka Ranaweera (SL)

- Sri Lanka won the toss and elected to bat.

=== Final ===
15 October 2022
13:30
Scorecard

Sri Lanka; 65/9 (20 overs)	v	India; 71/2 (8.3 overs)
Inoka Ranaweera 18* (22); Renuka Singh 3/5 (3 overs)		Smriti Mandhana 51* (25); Kavisha Dilhari 1/17 (2 overs)

India won by 8 wickets
Sylhet International Cricket Stadium, Sylhet
Umpires: Saleema Imtiaz (Pak) and Shivani Mishra (Qat)
Player of the match: Renuka Singh Thakur (Ind)

- Sri Lanka won the toss and elected to bat.

== Statistics ==
=== Most runs ===
Player	Innings	NO	Runs	Average	SR	HS	100	50	4s	6s
(India) Jemimah Rodrigues	6	2	217	54.25	135.62	76	0	2	29	1
(Sri Lanka) Harshitha Samarawickrama	8	0	202	25.25	92.23	81	0	1	22	0
(India) Shafali Verma	6	0	166	27.66	122.05	55	0	1	13	6
(Pakistan) Sidra Ameen	7	1	158	26.33	90.28	56	0	1	19	9
(Pakistan) Nida Dar	5	3	145	72.50	111.53	56*	0	1	11	1
Updated: 15 October 2022

=== Most wickets ===
Player	Innings	Wickets	Runs	Overs	BBI	Econ.	Ave.	5WI
(India) Deepti Sharma	8	13	100	30.0	3/7	3.33	7.69	0
(Sri Lanka) Inoka Ranaweera	8	13	121	26.0	4/7	4.65	9.30	0
(Bangladesh) Rumana Ahmed	5	10	58	12.0	3/9	4.83	5.80	0
(Pakistan) Omaima Sohail	6	10	88	19.0	5/13	4.63	8.80	1
(India) Rajeshwari Gayakwad	7	9	106	23.0	2/8	4.60	11.77	0
Updated: 15 October 2022
