= Malaysia women's national cricket team =

Cricket team

Malaysia
- Association: Malaysian Cricket Association

Personnel
- Captain: Winifred Duraisingam
- Coach: Thusara Kodikara

International Cricket Council
- ICC status: Associate member (1967)
- ICC region: Asia
ICC Rankings	Current	Best-ever
T20I	27th	27th (11 Oct 2022)

International cricket
- First international: Singapore; 30 Apr 2006

T20 Internationals
- First T20I: India at Kinrara Academy Oval, Kuala Lumpur; 3 June 2018
- Last T20I: China at Bayuemas Oval, Pandamaran; 22 November 2026
T20Is	Played	Won/Lost
Total	122	51/69 (1 tie, 1 no result)
This year	28	7/20 (1 tie, 0 no results)
- As of 22 November 2026

The Malaysian women's national cricket team represents Malaysia in international women's cricket matches. The team made its debut against Singapore on 30 April 2006, winning by 58 runs. In August 2017, Malaysia won the bronze medal in the women's tournament at the 2017 Southeast Asian Games.

In April 2018, the International Cricket Council (ICC) granted full Women's Twenty20 International (WT20I) status to all its members. Therefore, all Twenty20 matches played between Malaysia women and another international side since 1 July 2018 have the full WT20I status. In June 2018, Malaysia played its first Women's T20I against India in the 2018 Women's Twenty20 Asia Cup.

In December 2020, the ICC announced the qualification pathway for the 2023 ICC Women's T20 World Cup. Malaysia were named in the 2021 ICC Women's T20 World Cup Asia Qualifier regional group, alongside seven other teams. In April 2021, the Malaysian Cricket Association awarded contracts to 15 players, the first time female cricketers for the Malaysian team had been granted contracts.

== History ==
In April 2021, the Malaysian Cricket Association announced it would award central contracts to 15 female players.

== Tournament history ==
=== Women's World Cup ===
World Cup record
Year	Round	Position	GP	W	L	T	NR
(England) 1973	Did not qualify/No women's ODI status						
(India) 1978	Did not qualify/No women's ODI status						
(New Zealand) 1982	Did not qualify/No women's ODI status						
(Australia) 1988	Did not qualify/No women's ODI status						
(England) 1993	Did not qualify/No women's ODI status						
(India) 1997	Did not qualify/No women's ODI status						
(New Zealand) 2000	Did not qualify/No women's ODI status						
(South Africa) 2005	Did not qualify/No women's ODI status						
(Australia) 2009	Did not qualify/No women's ODI status						
(India) 2013	Did not qualify/No women's ODI status						
(England) 2017	Did not qualify/No women's ODI status						
(New Zealand) 2022	Did not qualify/No women's ODI status						
(India) 2025	To be determined						
Total	-	0 Titles	0	0	0	0	0

=== Women's World T20 ===
Twenty20 World Cup Record
Year	Round	Position	GP	W	L	T	NR
(England) 2009	Did not qualify						
(Cricket West Indies) 2010	Did not qualify						
(Sri Lanka) 2012	Did not qualify						
(Bangladesh) 2014	Did not qualify						
(India) 2016	Did not qualify						
(Cricket West Indies) 2018	Did not qualify						
(Australia) 2020	Did not qualify						
(South Africa) 2023	Did not qualify						
(Bangladesh) 2024	Did not qualify						
Total	0/8	0 Titles	0	0	0	0	0

=== ICC Women's T20 World Cup Qualifier ===
ICC Women's World Twenty20 Qualifier record
Year	Round	Position	GP	W	L	T	NR
(Republic of Ireland) 2013	Did not qualify						
(Thailand) 2015	Did not qualify						
(Netherlands) 2018	Did not qualify						
(Scotland) 2019	Did not qualify						
(United Arab Emirates) 2022	Did not qualify						
(United Arab Emirates) 2024	Did not qualify						
Total	0/6	0 Titles	0	0	0	0	0

=== ICC Women's T20 World Cup Asia Qualifier ===
ICC Women's T20 World Cup Asia Qualifier records
Year	Round	Position	GP	W	L	T	NR
(Thailand) 2017	The full data of the tournament have not found						
(Thailand) 2019	DNQ	6/7	6	1	5	0	0
(United Arab Emirates) 2021	DNQ	4/6	5	2	3	0	0
(Malaysia) 2023	DNQ	—	5	2	2	0	1
(Thailand) 2025	DNQ	—	4	1	1	0	2
Total	4/4	0 Titles	20	6	11	0	3

=== Women's Asia Cup ===
Women's Asia Cup Record
Year	Round	Position	GP	W	L	T	NR
2004 (Sri Lanka)	Did not enter (ODI format)						
2005-06 (Pakistan)	Did not enter (ODI format)						
2006 (India)	Did not enter (ODI format)						
2008 (Sri Lanka)	Did not enter (ODI format)						
2012 (China)	Did not qualify						
2016 (Thailand)	Did not qualify						
2018 (Malaysia)	Round robin	6th	6	0	6	0	0
2022 (Bangladesh)	Round robin	7th	6	0	6	0	0
2024 (Sri Lanka)	Group League	8th	3	0	3	0	0
Total	-	-	15	0	15	0	0

=== ACC Women's Premier Cup ===
ACC Women's Premier Cup Record
Year	Round	Position	GP	W	L	T	NR
2024 (Malaysia)	Runners-up	2/16	6	5	1	0	0
Total	1/1	0 Titles	6	5	1	0	0

== Current squad ==
This lists all the players who have played for Malaysia in the past 12 months or were part of the most recent squad.

Name	Age	Batting style	Bowling style	Notes
Batters
Aina Najwa	30	Right-handed		
Elsa Hunter	21	Right-handed		
Ainur Amelina	21	Right-handed	Right-arm medium	
All-rounders
Mas Elysa	25	Right-handed	Right-arm leg break	Vice-captain
Ainna Hamizah	26	Right-handed	Right-arm medium	
Winifred Duraisingam	33	Right-handed	Right-arm medium	Captain
Mahirah Izzati Ismail	26	Right-handed	Right-arm off break	
Intan Jamahidayu	30	Right-handed	Right-arm medium	
Musfirah Nur Ainaa	20	Right-handed	Right-arm off break	
Wicketkeeper
Wan Julia	37	Right-handed	-	
Spin Bowlers
Nur Dania Syuhada	21	Right-handed	Right-arm off break	
Nik Nur Atiela	27	Right-handed	Right-arm off break	
Pace Bowlers
Aisya Eleesa	24	Right-handed	Right-arm medium	
Nur Arianna Natsya	24	Left-handed	Left-arm medium	
Wan Nor Zulaika	23	Right-handed	Right-arm medium	
Dhanusri Muhunan	23	Right-handed	Right-arm medium	

Updated on 19 September 2023.

== Records and statistics ==
International Match Summary — Malaysia Women

Last updated 22 November 2026

Playing Record
Format	M	W	L	T	NR	Inaugural Match
Twenty20 Internationals	122	51	69	1	1	20 August 2018

=== Twenty20 International ===
- Highest team total: 188/3 v. Bahrain on 13 February 2024 at Kinrara Academy Oval, Kuala Lumpur.
- Highest individual score: 73, Winifred Duraisingam v. Oman on 22 June 2022 at Kinrara Academy Oval, Kuala Lumpur.
- Best individual bowling figures: 6/3, Mas Elysa v. China on 16 January 2019 at Asian Institute of Technology Ground, Bangkok.

Most T20I runs for Malaysia Women

Player	Runs	Average	Career span
Mas Elysa	1,719	18.89	2018–2026
Winifred Duraisingam	1,503	15.98	2018–2026
Ainna Hamizah Hashim	1,003	14.97	2018–2026
Wan Julia	962	12.82	2018–2026
Elsa Hunter	861	20.02	2019–2026

Most T20I wickets for Malaysia Women

Player	Wickets	Average	Career span
Mahirah Izzati Ismail	76	16.42	2018–2026
Winifred Duraisingam	67	23.19	2018–2026
Ainna Hamizah Hashim	65	22.12	2018–2026
Nur Dania Syuhada	61	20.91	2018–2026
Aisya Eleesa	54	19.74	2018–2026

T20I record versus other nations

Records complete to T20I #3088. Last updated 22 November 2026.

Opponent	M	W	L	T	NR	First match	First win
ICC Full members
Bangladesh	4	0	4	0	0	9 June 2018	
India	3	0	2	0	1	3 June 2018	
Pakistan	2	0	2	0	0	7 June 2018	
Sri Lanka	5	0	5	0	0	4 June 2018	
ICC Associate members
Bahrain	2	2	0	0	0	3 September 2023	3 September 2023
Bhutan	5	2	3	0	0	28 November 2021	28 November 2021
China	5	3	1	1	0	16 January 2019	16 January 2019
Hong Kong	11	3	8	0	0	27 February 2019	24 June 2022
Indonesia	6	2	4	0	0	10 February 2024	10 February 2024
Japan	3	2	1	0	0	14 February 2024	14 February 2024
Kenya	1	1	0	0	0	23 January 2022	23 January 2022
Kuwait	8	8	0	0	0	18 February 2019	18 February 2019
Myanmar	3	2	1	0	0	18 January 2019	14 May 2023
Namibia	3	0	3	0	0	10 December 2024	
Nepal	19	7	12	0	0	13 January 2019	29 May 2023
Oman	1	1	0	0	0	22 June 2022	22 June 2022
Philippines	2	2	0	0	0	6 May 2023	6 May 2023
Qatar	3	3	0	0	0	18 June 2022	18 June 2022
Scotland	1	0	1	0	0	19 January 2022	
Singapore	15	13	2	0	0	9 August 2018	9 August 2018
Thailand	9	0	9	0	0	6 June 2018	
United Arab Emirates	11	0	11	0	0	15 January 2019	

== See also ==
- List of Malaysia women Twenty20 International cricketers
