= Saleema Imtiaz =

Pakistan cricket umpire

Personal information
- Full name: Saleema Imtiaz
- Born: 18 December 1971 (age 54)
- Role: Umpire
- Relatives: Kainat Imtiaz (daughter)

Umpiring information
- WODIs umpired: 5 (2025)
- WT20Is umpired: 32 (2022–2026)
- Source: Cricinfo, 15 September 2024

Saleema Imtiaz (born 18 December 1971) is an international cricket umpire from Pakistan. In October 2022, she stood in matches in the Women's Twenty20 Asia Cup tournament. On 15 September 2024, she was added to the Development Panel of ICC Umpires and became Pakistan's first woman umpire on ICC Development Panel.

Pakistan women's national team all-rounder Kainat Imtiaz is her daughter.

== Umpiring career ==
Saleema Imtiaz began her umpiring career with the Pakistan Cricket Board (PCB) women's umpires panel in 2008. She made her international debut as an umpire in the India v Sri Lank match in the Women's Twenty20 Asia Cup. She has also officiated in many events of the Asian Cricket Council (ACC) such as the 2024 Women's Twenty20 Asia Cup and the 2023 ACC Women's T20 Emerging Teams Asia Cup in Hong Kong. She was also part of the umpiring panel for the 2024 ACC Women's Premier Cup in Kuala Lumpur.

== See also ==
- List of Twenty20 International cricket umpires
