= Nur Arianna Natsya =

Malaysian cricketer (born 2002)

Personal information
- Full name: Nur Arianna Natsya Binti Benn Rakquidean
- Born: 28 March 2002 (age 24)
- Batting: Right-handed
- Bowling: Slow left arm orthodox

International information
- National side: Malaysia
- T20I debut (cap 28): 18 January 2022 v Bangladesh
- Last T20I: 14 February 2024 v Japan
- Source: ESPNCricinfo, 20 February 2024

Nur Arianna Natsya (born 28 March 2002) is a Malaysian cricketer who plays as a right-handed batter and left-arm spinner. In January 2022, she made her T20I debut against Bangladesh. In October 2022, she played a few T20Is against Test playing teams in Women's Asia Cup.

In April 2023, she was selected for the SouthEast Asian Games. In September 2023, she was selected in Malaysia's 2023 Asian Games squad.

In January 2024, she was selected to play for Malaysia in ACC Women's Premier Cup.
