= Nur Dania Syuhada =

Malaysian cricketer (born 2005)

Personal information
- Full name: Nur Dania Syuhada
- Born: 11 September 2005 (age 21); Kuching, Malaysia
- Batting: Right-handed
- Role: Right-arm offbreak

International information
- National side: Malaysia
- T20I debut (cap 29): 18 January 2022 v Bangladesh
- Last T20I: 18 February 2024 v United Arab Emirates
- Source: Cricinfo, 20 February 2024

Nur Dania Syuhada (born 11 September 2005) is a Malaysian cricketer. In January 2022, at the age of 16, she made her T20I debut against Bangladesh. In October 2022, she played a few T20Is against Test playing teams in Women's Asia Cup.

In April 2023, she was selected for the SouthEast Asian Games. In September 2023, she was selected in Malaysia's 2023 Asian Games squad.

In January 2024, she was selected to play for Malaysia in ACC Women's Premier Cup.
