= Aisya Eleesa =

Malaysian cricketer

Personal information
- Full name: Aisya Eleesa Firdauz
- Born: 24 October 2002 (age 24)
- Batting: Right-handed
- Bowling: Right-arm medium

International information
- National side: Malaysia
- T20I debut (cap 22): 10 August 2018 v Singapore
- Last T20I: 22 May 2026 v Nepal
- Source: Cricinfo, 8 October 2024

Aisya Eleesa (born 24 October 2002) is a Malaysian cricketer. In August 2018, at the age of 15 years, she made her T20I debut against Singapore. In October 2022, she played a few T20Is against Test-playing teams in the Women's Asia Cup.

In April 2023, she was selected for the Southeast Asian Games. In September 2023, she was selected in Malaysia's 2023 Asian Games squad.

In January 2024, she was selected to play for Malaysia in ACC Women's Premier Cup.
