= Thipatcha Putthawong =

Thai cricketer (born 2004)

Personal information
- Full name: Thipatcha Putthawong
- Born: 7 March 2004 (age 22); Chiang Mai, Thailand
- Batting: Left-handed
- Bowling: Slow left-arm orthodox
- Role: Bowler

International information
- National side: Thailand
- ODI debut (cap 9): 20 November 2022 v Netherlands
- Last ODI: 7 July 2023 v Netherlands
- T20I debut (cap 13): 12 January 2019 v Myanmar
- Last T20I: 8 December 2024 v Namibia

Career statistics
| Competition | WODI | WT20I |
|---|---|---|
| Matches | 9 | 59 |
| Runs scored | 31 | 145 |
| Batting average | 6.20 | 12.08 |
| 100s/50s | 0/0 | 0/0 |
| Top score | 12 | 37 |
| Balls bowled | 464 | 1,187 |
| Wickets | 15 | 75 |
| Bowling average | 14.93 | 10.73 |
| 5 wickets in innings | 1 | 1 |
| 10 wickets in match | 0 | 0 |
| Best bowling | 6/6 | 5/8 |
| Catches/stumpings | 1/– | 3/- |
Medal record
Representing Thailand
Women's Cricket
Southeast Asian Games
| Gold medal – first place | 2023 Cambodia | Twenty10 |
| Gold medal – first place | 2023 Cambodia | Twenty20 |
| Gold medal – first place | 2023 Cambodia | 50 overs |
- Source: ESPN Cricinfo, 10 December 2024

Thipatcha Putthawong (Thai:ทิภัชชา พุทธวงค์, born 7 March 2004) is a Thai cricketer. In January 2020, at the age of 15, she was selected in Thailand's squad for the 2020 ICC Women's T20 World Cup. Along with Suwanan Khiaoto, she was one of two cricketers selected for Thailand's squad at the Women's T20 World Cup who were not in the squad for the qualification tournament in Scotland. Prior to being named in Thailand's squad for the Women's T20 World Cup, she made her Women's Twenty20 International (WT20I) debut for Thailand, against Myanmar, on 12 January 2019 in the Thailand Women's T20 Smash.

In November 2021, she was named in Thailand's team for the 2021 Women's Cricket World Cup Qualifier tournament in Zimbabwe. She played in Thailand's first match of the tournament, on 21 November 2021 against Zimbabwe.

In October 2022, she played for Thailand in Women's Twenty20 Asia Cup.

Putthawong was part of the Thailand squad for the 2025 Women's Cricket World Cup Qualifier in Pakistan in April 2025.

== Career Achievements ==
On 19 April 2023, she achieved the sixth-best bowling figures in women's ODI history, with bowling figures of 6/6 against Zimbabwe.

In May 2023 Thipatcha won ICC's Player of the Month in the women's category.

In a July 2023 tri-series against the Netherlands, she found a place in the record books again by taking four wickets in four consecutive deliveries, achieving a double hat-trick to become just the 7th cricketer in history, and the 3rd woman cricketer, to achieve this feat. All four of the batters were bowled, which is rare in hat-tricks, especially in double hat tricks.

On May 1, 2024, she took her second 4-wicket haul in T20 internationals, against the United States, with all four batters being bowled on this occasion as well. She allowed just 12 runs in four overs, with one maiden and nineteen dot balls, and was awarded player of the match.
