= Humaira Farah =

Pakistani cricket umpire

Cricket information
- Role: Umpire

Umpiring information
- WT20Is umpired: 5 (2022–2026)
- Source: Cricinfo, 7 February 2023

Humaira Farah (Urdu :حمیرا فرح) is the first Pakistani female cricket umpire.

== Early life ==
Humaira's passion for sports began from early childhood, when she spent most of her time riding bikes and flying kites. Later, she completed her intermediate and graduation from Government College for Women in Baghbanpura, Lahore.

== Career ==
During her college days she also took part in a women's hockey tournament which was conducted in Hyderabad in which she was declared 'the best player'. Moreover, during Zia Ul Haq era in 1985 she was chosen to represent Pakistan's Railway Women Hockey Team. Throughout her struggle she was supported by her mother. Her eldest brother persuaded her to obtain a master's degree in Sport Sciences from Punjab University and she eventually topped in university. Later she did Bachelors in Education from Allama Iqbal Open University.

== Recognition ==
Humaira worked as a sports administrator for 28 years in Lahore Garrison University. Furthermore, in 2005 Humaira attended umpiring courses before appearing for exam and she was among the four women who successfully passed that exam. She was the only one who passed both Pakistan Cricket Board Panel's 1 and 2 exam the same year the panel formed its women's wing. She has officiated in 170 matches at different levels and umpired more than 150 matches. She is currently working as a sports director at Lahore Garrison University and is obtaining a doctorate in sport sciences. Together with PCB Pakistan was able to defeat West Indies for the first time in one day International series and South Africa.
