= Women's Asia Cup =

Asian Cricket tournament

- Administrator: Asian Cricket Council
- Format: WODI and WT20I
- First edition: 2004
- Latest edition: 2026
- Tournament format: Round-robin and knockouts
- Number of teams: 8
- Current champion: India (8th title)
- Most successful: India (8 titles)
- Most runs: (India) Mithali Raj
- Most wickets: (India) Neetu David

The Women's Asia Cup is a biennial cricket tournament organised by the Asian Cricket Council. It is contested by the senior national women's cricket teams of Asia to determine the continental champion.

The first Women's Asia Cup was held in 2004 in Colombo and Kandy, Sri Lanka. The 2020 edition was postponed to 2021 due to the COVID-19 pandemic but was later cancelled. The ICC has ruled that all matches played in the Asia Cup carry either ODI or T20I status. The 2012 edition was the first to be played in the T20 format.

As of 2026, ten Women's Asia Cup tournaments have been held, with India winning the most titles (four WODI and four WT20I).

== History ==
Winners of ACC Women's Asia Cup
Season	Format	Champion
2004	WODI	India
2005–06	WODI	India (2)
2006	WODI	India (3)
2008	WODI	India (4)
2012	WT20I	India (5)
2016	WT20I	India (6)
2018	WT20I	Bangladesh
2022	WT20I	India (7)
2024	WT20I	Sri Lanka
2026	WT20I	India (8)

=== One-Day Internationals ===
==== 2004 ====
The first Women's Asia Cup was played in Sri Lanka in April 2004. Only two teams took part, India and Sri Lanka and they played a ten match One-Day International series against each other. India won all five matches in the first Women's Asia Cup.

==== 2005–06 ====
Karachi, Pakistan hosted the second Women's Asia Cup in December 2005 and January 2006. Pakistan made their first appearance in the tournament. India again won the tournament, beating Sri Lanka by 97 runs in the final.

==== 2006 ====
The third Women's Asia Cup tournament was played in Jaipur, India in December 2006. The tournament went very much the way of the previous event. India beat Sri Lanka in the final, this time by eight wickets.

==== 2008 ====
The fourth Women's Asia Cup tournament was played in Sri Lanka in May 2008. India again won the tournament, defeating Sri Lanka by 177 runs in the final.

=== Twenty20 cricket ===
==== 2012 ====
The fifth Women's Asia Cup Tournament was played in Guanggong Cricket Stadium, Guangzhou, China from 24 to 31 October 2012. India defeated Pakistan by 19 runs in the final

==== 2016 ====
The sixth Women's Asia Cup tournament was played in Thailand, from 27 November to 4 December 2016. India beat Pakistan by 17 runs in the final, becoming champion for the 6th time consecutively.

==== 2018 ====
The seventh Women's Asia Cup tournament was played in Malaysia, from 3 June to 10 June 2018. Bangladesh beat six-time winner India by 3 wickets in the final to clinch their first Asia Cup title.

==== 2022 ====
A tournament was due to take place in 2020 in Bangladesh, but was postponed to 2021 (and eventually 2022) due to the COVID-19 pandemic. The 2022 edition of the tournament took place at Sylhet, Bangladesh in October 2022. India beat Sri Lanka in the final, this time by eight wickets by chasing a modest total of 65 and became 7th time winner. Jemimah Rodrigues was the highest run scorer of this tournament while Inoka Ranaweera and Deepti Sharma were the joint-highest wicket takers of this tournament.

==== 2024 ====
The ninth edition was hosted by Sri Lanka. A total of 15 games were played in the edition among the teams including semi finals and final. All the matches were held at Rangiri Dambulla International Stadium in Dambulla. Sri Lanka women defeated India women in the final to win their maiden Women's Asia Cup title. Sri Lanka's Chamari Athapaththu was the leading run scorer of the season with 243 runs from four matches

== Results ==
Year	Format	Host Nation	Final Venue	No. of teams	Final		
Year	Format	Host Nation	Final Venue	No. of teams	Winner	Result	Runner-up
2004	WODI	Sri Lanka	Sinhalese Sports Club Ground, Colombo	2	India	India won the tournament 5–0	Sri Lanka
2005–06	WODI	Pakistan	National Stadium, Karachi	3	India; 269/4 (50 overs)	India won by 97 runs	Sri Lanka; 172/9 (50 overs)
2006	WODI	India	Sawai Mansingh Stadium, Jaipur	3	India; 95/2 (27.5 overs)	India won by 8 wickets	Sri Lanka; 93 (44.1 overs)
2008	WODI	Sri Lanka	Welagedara Stadium, Kurunegala	4	India; 260/7 (50 overs)	India won by 177 runs	Sri Lanka; 83 (35.2 overs)
2012	WT20I	China	Guanggong International Cricket Stadium, Guangzhou	8	India; 81 (20 overs)	India won by 18 runs	Pakistan; 63 (19.1 overs)
2016	WT20I	Thailand	Asian Institute of Technology Ground, Bangkok	6	India; 121/5 (20 overs)	India won by 17 runs	Pakistan; 104/6 (20 overs)
2018	WT20I	Malaysia	Kinrara Academy Oval, Kuala Lumpur	6	Bangladesh; 113/7 (20 overs)	Bangladesh won by 3 wickets	India; 112/9 (20 overs)
2022	WT20I	Bangladesh	Sylhet International Cricket Stadium, Sylhet	7	India; 71/2 (8.3 overs)	India won by 8 wickets	Sri Lanka; 65/9 (20 overs)
2024	WT20I	Sri Lanka	Rangiri Dambulla International Stadium, Dambulla	8	Sri Lanka; 167/2 (18.4 overs)	Sri Lanka won by 8 wickets	India; 165/6 (20 overs)
2026	WT20I	United Arab Emirates	Dubai International Cricket Stadium	8	India; 183/5 (20 overs)	India won by 72 runs	Sri Lanka; 111 (20 overs)
2028	WT20I	TBD		8			

== Performance by team ==
Legend

- 1st – Champions
- 2nd – Runners-up
- 3rd – Third place
- SF - Semi-finalists
- GS – Group stage
- Q – Qualified

Host Team	(Sri Lanka) 2004 WODI	(Pakistan) 2005 WODI	(India) 2006 WODI	(Sri Lanka) 2008 WODI	(China) 2012 WT20I	(Thailand) 2016 WT20I	(Malaysia) 2018 WT20I	(Bangladesh) 2022 WT20I	(Sri Lanka) 2024 WT20I	(United Arab Emirates) 2026 WT20I	Total
Bangladesh	–	—	—	4th	SF	4th	1st	5th	SF	SF	7
China	—	—	—	—	GS	—	—	—	—	—	1
Hong Kong	–	—	—	—	GS	—	—	—	—	GS	2
India	1st	1st	1st	1st	1st	1st	2nd	1st	2nd	1st	10
Indonesia	–	—	—	—	—	—	—	—	—	GS	1
Malaysia	–	—	—	—	—	—	6th	7th	GS	—	3
Nepal	–	—	—	—	GS	6th	—	—	GS	—	3
Pakistan	–	3rd	3rd	3rd	2nd	2nd	3rd	SF	SF	SF	9
Sri Lanka	2nd	2nd	2nd	2nd	SF	3rd	4th	2nd	1st	2nd	10
Thailand	–	—	—	—	GS	5th	5th	SF	GS	GS	6
United Arab Emirates	–	—	—	—	—	—	—	6th	GS	GS	3

=== Debutant teams in main tournament ===
Year	Teams			
2004	India		Sri Lanka	
2005	Pakistan			
2006	—N/a			
2008	Bangladesh			
2012	China	Hong Kong	Nepal	Thailand
2016	—N/a			
2018	Malaysia			
2022	United Arab Emirates			
2024	—N/a			
2026	Indonesia			

== Ranking ==
=== Results ===
#	Year	Host	1st	2nd	3rd	4th	5th	6th	7th	8th	Teams
1	2004	SRI	IND	SRI							2
2	2005	PAK	IND	SRI	PAK						3
3	2006	IND	IND	SRI	PAK						3
4	2008	SRI	IND	SRI	PAK	BAN					4
5	2012	CHN	IND	PAK	BAN	SRI	THA	CHN	NEP	HKG	8
6	2016	THA	IND	PAK	SRI	BAN	THA	NEP			6
7	2018	MAS	BAN	IND	PAK	SRI	THA	MAS			6
8	2022	BAN	IND	SRI	PAK	THA	BAN	UAE	MAS		7
9	2024	SRI	SRI	IND	BAN	PAK	THA	NEP	UAE	MAS	8
10	2026	UAE	IND	SL	BAN	PAK	UAE	THA	INA	HKG	8

=== Medals ===
Rank	Nation	Gold	Silver	Bronze	Total
1	India (IND)	8	2	0	10
2	Sri Lanka (SRI)	1	6	2	9
3	Bangladesh (BAN)	1	0	3	4
4	Pakistan (PAK)	0	2	7	9
5	Thailand (THA)	0	0	1	1
Totals (5 entries)		10	10	13	33

=== Summary ===
Rank	Team	Part	M	W	L	D	NR	Win rate (%)
1	India	9	52	48	4	0	0	91%
2	Sri Lanka	9	49	24	24	0	1	45%
3	Pakistan	8	41	18	23	0	0	43%
4	Bangladesh	6	31	15	15	0	1	48%
5	Thailand	5	23	8	15	0	0	35%
6	China	1	3	1	2	0	0	33%
7	United Arab Emirates	3	10	2	7	0	1	14%
8	Nepal	3	9	1	7	0	0	11%
9	Hong Kong	2	6	0	6	0	0	0%
10	Malaysia	2	11	0	11	0	0	0%
11	Indonesia	1	3	0	3	0	0	0%

=== Qualification ===
#	Year	Games	Teams in Qualification	Qualified Teams
1–7	2004–2018	No qualification round		
8	2022	2022 T20 Championship	10	2
9	2024	2024 Premier Cup	16	4
10	2026	2026 Premier Cup	18	4
Total	3	Women's Asia Cup Qualification	Max: 18	Max: 4

== See also ==
- Asia Cup – the equivalent men's event
- ACC Emerging Teams Asia Cup
- ACC Under-19 Asia Cup
