= Dhanusri Muhunan =

Malaysian cricketer (born 2003)

Personal information
- Full name: Dhanusri Sri Muhunan
- Born: 29 September 2003 (age 23)
- Batting: Right-handed
- Bowling: Right-arm medium

International information
- National side: Malaysia
- T20I debut (cap 14): 9 June 2018 v Bangladesh
- Last T20I: 22 July 2024 v Sri Lanka
Medal record
Representing Malaysia
Women's Cricket
Southeast Asian Games
Bronze medal – third place	2025 Thailand	T10
- Source: Cricinfo, 8 October 2024

Dhanusri Muhunan (born 29 September 2003) is a Malaysian cricketer.

She made her Women's Twenty20 International (WT20I) debut for Malaysia against Bangladesh on 9 June 2018, in the 2018 Women's Twenty20 Asia Cup, at the age of 14 years. In November 2021, she was named in Malaysia's side for the 2021 ICC Women's T20 World Cup Asia Qualifier tournament in the United Arab Emirates. In September 2022, she was selected in Malaysia's squad for Women's Twenty20 Asia Cup.
