= Bangi, Selangor =

Town in Selangor, Malaysia

Coordinates: 2°54′N 101°47′E

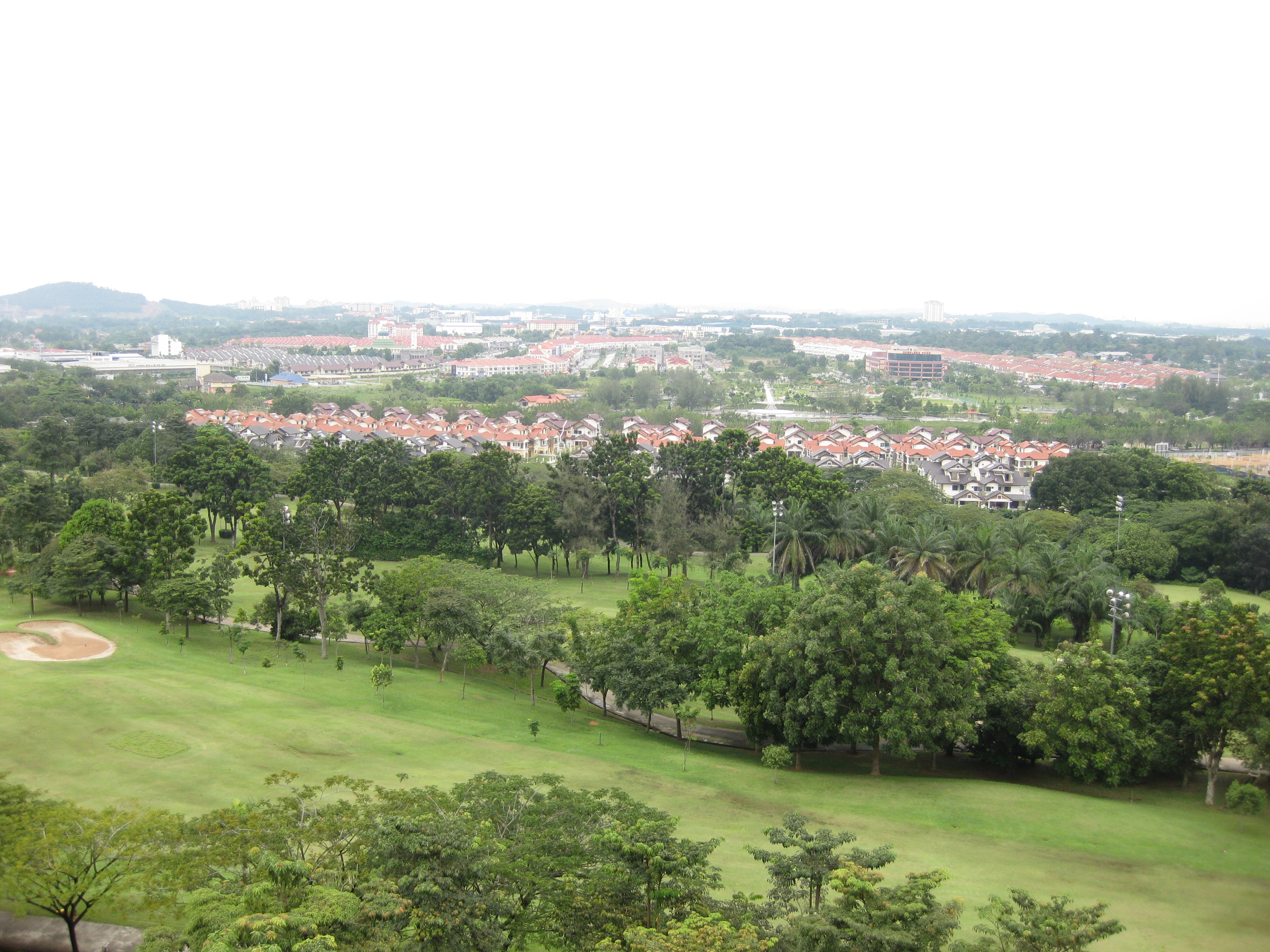
View of Bangi

Bangi (Jawi: باڠي), alternately Bangi Lama, is a small town situated south of Hulu Langat District, Selangor, Malaysia.

== Geography ==
It is roughly situated between the towns of Kajang (11 km [6.8 mi]) and Nilai, Negeri Sembilan (13 km [8.1 mi]). The town is surrounded by palm oil estates, most of which were converted to townships over the last 20 years. The town is surrounded by small Malay villages, within three kilometres (1.9 mi), namely, Kampung Bangi, Kampung Bahagia, Kampung Batu Lima, Kampung Rinching.

Bangi is not to be confused with Bandar Baru Bangi, a larger township opened more recently. Bandar Baru Bangi is situated about 7 kilometers north of Bangi proper and is nearer to Kajang town.

== Features ==
There is a main road with shops houses on both side of the road. Behind these shophouses, 30 acres of rubber estates were converted to residential housing, now known as Kampong Aman. A Malaysian Palm Oil Board research station belonging to UKM is also located near to the town.

Within three kilometres (1.9 mi), there are Seri Putra Bangi, Bukit Mahkota Bangi, Bangi Avenue, Taman Impian and many more.

== Transportation ==
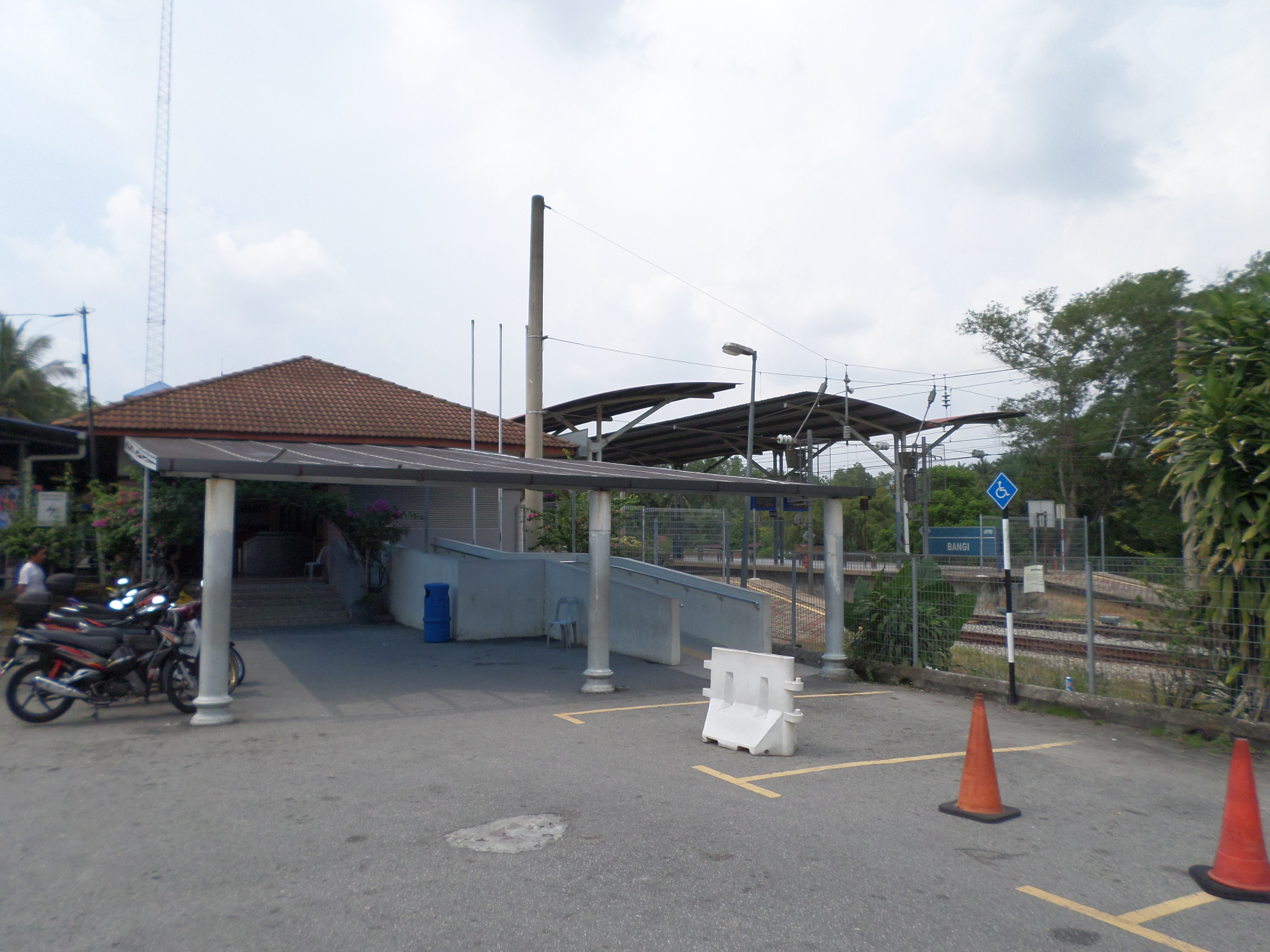
Bangi Komuter station

Bangi is served by the KTM Komuter services via the Bangi Komuter station on the Batu Caves-Pulau Sebang Line.
