= Netherlands women's cricket team in Thailand in 2022–23 =

International cricket tour

	Thailand	Netherlands
- Dates: 20 November – 3 December 2022
Captains	Naruemol Chaiwai	Heather Siegers (Note: Babette de Leede captained the Netherlands in the fourth ODI and the first T20I.)

One Day International series
- Results: Thailand won the 4-match series 4–0
Most runs	Natthakan Chantam (267)	Babette de Leede (159)
Most wickets	Suleeporn Laomi (10)	Iris Zwilling (10)

Twenty20 International series
- Results: Thailand won the 4-match series 3–1
Most runs	Naruemol Chaiwai (87)	Sterre Kalis (127)
Most wickets	Onnicha Kamchomphu (7)	Heather Siegers (4); Eva Lynch (4); Hannah Landheer (4)
- Player of the series: Sterre Kalis (Ned)

The Netherlands women's cricket team toured Thailand in November and December 2022 to play four Women's One Day Internationals (WODIs) and four Women's Twenty20 Internationals (WT20Is). The matches were played at the Royal Chiangmai Golf Club in Mae Faek, Chiang Mai province. The WODI matches were the first played by Thailand since the International Cricket Council granted them (along with four other nations, including the Netherlands) ODI status in May 2022.

Thailand won the first game of the ODI series – their debut in the format – by 100 runs under the Duckworth-Lewis-Stern method. Thailand went on to take the series 4–0. Thailand also won the opening match of the T20I series in convincing fashion, by a margin of 10 wickets. Netherlands managed to bounce back in the second T20I by winning the match on the last ball, which was also their first ever victory over Thailand in international cricket. Thailand won the last two T20Is to take the series 3–1.

== Squads ==
Thailand	Netherlands
Naruemol Chaiwai (c); Nattaya Boochatham; Nanthita Boonsukham; Natthakan Chantam; Onnicha Kamchomphu; Rosenan Kanoh; Suwanan Khiaoto (wk); Nannapat Koncharoenkai (wk); Suleeporn Laomi; Banthida Leephatthana (wk); Phannita Maya; Thipatcha Putthawong; Aphisara Suwanchonrathi; Chanida Sutthiruang; Sornnarin Tippoch	Heather Siegers (c); Babette de Leede (wk); Gwen Bloemen; Caroline de Lange; Sterre Kalis; Hannah Landheer; Eva Lynch; Frederique Overdijk; Robine Rijke; Silver Siegers; Annemijn Thomson; Annemijn van Beuge; Robyn van Oosterom; Jolien van Vliet (wk); Iris Zwilling

== WODI series ==
=== 1st WODI ===
20 November 2022
10:00
Scorecard

Thailand; 243/9 (50 overs)	v	Netherlands; 134 (44.5 overs)
Natthakan Chantam 102 (135); Frederique Overdijk 3/39 (8 overs)		Babette de Leede 33 (62); Onnicha Kamchomphu 3/35 (10 overs)

Thailand won by 100 runs (DLS method)
Royal Chiangmai Golf Club, Mae Faek
Umpires: Viswanadan Kalidas (Mas) and Sarika Prasad (Sin)
Player of the match: Natthakan Chantam (Tha)

- Netherlands won the toss and elected to field.
- Netherlands were set a revised target of 235 runs from 46 overs due to rain.
- Nattaya Boochatham, Naruemol Chaiwai, Natthakan Chantam, Onnicha Kamchomphu, Rosenanee Kanoh, Nannapat Koncharoenkai, Suleeporn Laomi, Phannita Maya, Thipatcha Putthawong, Chanida Sutthiruang, Sornnarin Tippoch (Tha), Sterre Kalis, Hannah Landheer and Heather Siegers (Ned) all made their WODI debuts.
- Natthakan Chantam became the first cricketer for Thailand to score a century in WODIs.

=== 2nd WODI ===
22 November 2022
10:00
Scorecard

Thailand; 176 (41.1 overs)	v	Netherlands; 168 (46.1 overs)
Natthakan Chantam 42 (65); Eva Lynch 4/33 (10 overs)		Sterre Kalis 54 (91); Suleeporn Laomi 3/43 (9 overs)

Thailand won by 8 runs
Royal Chiangmai Golf Club, Mae Faek
Umpires: Ashwani Kumar Rana (Tha) and Sarika Prasad (Sin)
Player of the match: Natthakan Chantam (Tha)

- Thailand won the toss and elected to bat.

=== 3rd WODI ===
24 November 2022
10:00
Scorecard

Thailand; 227 (48.4 overs)	v	Netherlands; 128 (38.3 overs)
Naruemol Chaiwai 65 (102); Iris Zwilling 5/25 (9.4 overs)		Heather Siegers 32 (33); Suleeporn Laomi 4/26 (9 overs)

Thailand won by 99 runs
Royal Chiangmai Golf Club, Mae Faek
Umpires: Viswanadan Kalidas (Mas) and Ashwani Kumar Rana (Tha)
Player of the match: Naruemol Chaiwai (Tha)

- Netherlands won the toss and chose to field.
- Annemijn Thomson (Ned) made her WODI debut.
- Iris Zwilling (Ned) took her first five-wicket haul in ODIs.

=== 4th WODI ===
26 November 2022
10:00
Scorecard

Netherlands; 145 (42.5 overs)	v	Thailand; 146/3 (26.1 overs)
Babette de Leede 59 (75); Nanthita Boonsukham 4/26 (9.5 overs)		Natthakan Chantam 68 (74); Iris Zwilling 2/24 (8 overs)

Thailand won by 7 wickets
Royal Chiangmai Golf Club, Mae Faek
Umpires: Viswanadan Kalidas (Mas) and Sarika Prasad (Sin)
Player of the match: Nanthita Boonsukham (Tha)

- Netherlands won the toss and elected to bat.
- Nanthita Boonsukham and Banthida Leephatthana (Tha) both made their WODI debuts.

== WT20I series ==
=== 1st WT20I ===
29 November 2022
13:30
Scorecard

Netherlands; 89/8 (20 overs)	v	Thailand; 90/0 (18.4 overs)
Robine Rijke 33 (40); Suleeporn Laomi 3/14 (4 overs)		Nannapat Koncharoenkai 44* (62)

Thailand won by 10 wickets
Royal Chiangmai Golf Club, Mae Faek
Umpires: Ashwani Kumar Rana (Tha) and Sarika Prasad (Sin)
Player of the match: Suleeporn Laomi (Tha)

- Netherlands won the toss and elected to bat.
- Robyn van Oosterom (Ned) made her T20I debut.

=== 2nd WT20I ===
30 November 2022
13:30
Scorecard

Thailand; 113/5 (20 overs)	v	Netherlands; 116/5 (20 overs)
Naruemol Chaiwai 40* (44); Eva Lynch 3/25 (4 overs)		Sterre Kalis 56 (56); Thipatcha Putthawong 2/22 (4 overs)

Netherlands won by 5 wickets
Royal Chiangmai Golf Club, Mae Faek
Umpires: Samad Akbar (Tha) and Sarika Prasad (Sin)
Player of the match: Sterre Kalis (Ned)

- Thailand won the toss and elected to bat.

=== 3rd WT20I ===
2 December 2022
10:00
Scorecard

Netherlands; 73/7 (19 overs)	v	Thailand; 74/5 (18.1 overs)
Robine Rijke 17 (33); Nattaya Boochatham 2/3 (3 overs)		Nannapat Koncharoenkai 21 (32); Natthakan Chantam 21 (32); Hannah Landheer 3/14 (4 overs)

Thailand won by 5 wickets
Royal Chiangmai Golf Club, Mae Faek
Umpires: Samad Akbar (Tha) and Ashwani Kumar Rana (Tha)
Player of the match: Nattaya Boochatham (Tha)

- Thailand won the toss and elected to field.
- The match was reduced to 19 overs per side due to rain.

=== 4th WT20I ===
3 December 2022
10:00
Scorecard

Thailand; 126/8 (20 overs)	v	Netherlands; 95/6 (20 overs)
Naruemol Chaiwai 47 (45); Iris Zwilling 2/15 (4 overs)		Sterre Kalis 39 (46); Onnicha Kamchomphu 2/19 (4 overs)

Thailand won by 31 runs
Royal Chiangmai Golf Club, Mae Faek
Umpires: Samad Akbar (Tha) and Ashwani Kumar Rana (Tha)
Player of the match: Naruemol Chaiwai (Tha)

- Netherlands won the toss and elected to field.
