= Thailand women's cricket team against Ireland in the UAE in 2024 =

International cricket tour

	Ireland	Thailand
- Dates: 16 – 18 April 2024
Captains	Laura Delany	Naruemol Chaiwai

Twenty20 International series
- Results: Ireland won the 2-match series 1–0
Most runs	Orla Prendergast (32)	Nannapat Koncharoenkai (27)
Most wickets	Arlene Kelly (4)	Onnicha Kamchomphu (1); Chanida Sutthiruang (1)

The Thailand women's cricket team toured the United Arab Emirates in April 2024 to play two Twenty20 International (T20I) matches against Ireland. The series formed part of both teams' preparation ahead of the 2024 ICC Women's T20 World Cup Qualifier tournament.

After the first match was abandoned due to heavy rain in the region, Ireland won the second match by 8 wickets to take the series 1–0.

== Squads ==
Ireland	Thailand
Laura Delany (c); Ava Canning; Alana Dalzell; Georgina Dempsey; Amy Hunter (wk); Arlene Kelly; Gaby Lewis; Louise Little; Joanna Loughran; Jane Maguire; Cara Murray; Leah Paul; Orla Prendergast; Eimear Richardson; Rebecca Stokell	Naruemol Chaiwai (c); Nattaya Boochatham; Nannaphat Chaihan; Natthakan Chantham; Sunida Chaturongrattana; Onnicha Kamchomphu; Rosenanee Kanoh; Suwanan Khiaoto (wk); Nannapat Koncharoenkai (wk); Suleeporn Laomi; Phannita Maya; Chayanisa Phengpaen; Thipatcha Putthawong; Chanida Sutthiruang; Aphisara Suwanchonrathi

== T20I series ==
=== 1st T20I ===
16 April 2024
15:30
Scorecard

Ireland	v	Thailand

Match abandoned
The Sevens Stadium, Dubai
Umpires: Nadeem Anjum (UAE) and Ali Kamran (UAE)

- No toss.
- No play was possible due to rain.

=== 2nd T20I ===
18 April 2024
19:00 (N)
Scorecard

Thailand; 79 (19 overs)	v	Ireland; 83/2 (13.2 overs)
Nannapat Koncharoenkai 27 (34); Arlene Kelly 4/12 (3 overs)		Orla Prendergast 32 (37); Onnicha Kamchomphu 1/13 (2.2 overs)

Ireland won by 8 wickets
The Sevens Stadium, Dubai
Umpires: Raziq Khan (UAE) and Hemangi Yerzal (UAE)

- Thailand won the toss and elected to bat.
- Laura Delany became the first women's cricketer to play 200 international matches for Ireland.
