= International cricket in 2022–23 =

International cricket season

The 2022–23 international cricket season was from September 2022 to April 2023. This calendar included men's Test, One Day International (ODI) and Twenty20 International (T20I) matches, women's Test, women's One Day Internationals (WODIs) and women's Twenty20 Internationals (WT20Is) matches, as well as some other significant series. In addition to the matches shown here, a number of other T20I/WT20I series involving associate nations were also played during this period.

The 2022 ICC Men's T20 World Cup, the 2022 Women's Twenty20 Asia Cup, and the 2023 ICC Women's T20 World Cup, all took place during this time. In the round-robin stage of 2022 Women's Twenty20 Asia Cup, Thailand beat Pakistan by 4 wickets to register their first ever win in international cricket against the opponents. In July 2022, South Africa withdrew from the three-match ODI series against Australia, after the fixtures clashed with their new domestic T20 league. As a result, Cricket Australia relocated some of its home schedule to include venues that would have hosted the ODI matches. The matches would have formed part of the 2020–2023 ICC Cricket World Cup Super League, with Cricket South Africa and the International Cricket Council (ICC) agreeing to award the points to Australia.

== Season overview ==
Men's international tours
Start date	Home team	Away team	Results [Matches]		
Start date	Home team	Away team	Test	ODI	T20I
6 September 2022	Australia	New Zealand	—	3–0 [3]	—
20 September 2022	India	Australia	2–1 [4]	1–2 [3]	2–1 [3]
20 September 2022	Pakistan	England	0–3 [3]	—	3–4 [7]
25 September 2022	United Arab Emirates	Bangladesh	—	—	0–2 [2]
28 September 2022	India	South Africa	—	2–1 [3]	2–1 [3]
5 October 2022	Australia	West Indies	2–0 [2]	—	2–0 [2]
9 October 2022	Australia	England	—	3–0 [3]	0–2 [3]
14 November 2022	Nepal	United Arab Emirates	—	2–1 [3]	—
18 November 2022	New Zealand	India	—	1–0 [3]	0–1 [3]
25 November 2022	Sri Lanka	Afghanistan	—	1–1 [3]	—
4 December 2022	Bangladesh	India	0–2 [2]	2–1 [3]	–
17 December 2022	Australia	South Africa	2–0 [3]	[3] (Note: In July 2022, South Africa withdrew from the ODI series due to the matches clashing with a new domestic T20 league. The Super League points being awarded to Australia.)	—
26 December 2022	Pakistan	New Zealand	0–0 [2]	1–2 [3]	—
3 January 2023	India	Sri Lanka	—	3–0 [3]	2–1 [3]
12 January 2023	Zimbabwe	Ireland	—	1–1 [3]	2–1 [3]
18 January 2023	India	New Zealand	—	3–0 [3]	2–1 [3]
27 January 2023	South Africa	England	—	2–1 [3]	—
4 February 2023	Zimbabwe	West Indies	0–1 [2]	—	—
16 February 2023	New Zealand	England	1–1 [2]	—	—
16 February 2023	United Arab Emirates	Afghanistan	—	—	1–2 [3]
23 February 2023	United Arab Emirates	Namibia	—	1–1 [2]	—
28 February 2023	South Africa	West Indies	2–0 [2]	1–1 [3]	1–2 [3]
1 March 2023	Bangladesh	England	—	1–2 [3]	3–0 [3]
9 March 2023	New Zealand	Sri Lanka	2–0 [2]	2–0 [3]	2–1 [3]
18 March 2023	Bangladesh	Ireland	1–0 [1]	2–0 [3]	2–1 [3]
21 March 2023	Zimbabwe	Netherlands	—	2–1 [3]	—
24 March 2023	(United Arab Emirates) Afghanistan	Pakistan	—	—	2–1 [3]
31 March 2023	South Africa	Netherlands	—	2–0 [2]	—
14 April 2023	Pakistan	New Zealand	—	4–1 [5]	2–2 [5]
16 April 2023	Sri Lanka	Ireland	2–0 [2]	—	—
Men's international tournaments
Start date	Tournament				Winners
11 September 2022	2022 Papua New Guinea Tri-Nation Series (round 16)				—N/a
7 October 2022	2022–23 New Zealand Tri-Nation Series				Pakistan
16 October 2022	(Australia) 2022 ICC Men's T20 World Cup				England
19 November 2022	2022 Namibia Tri-Nation Series (round 17)				—N/a
1 December 2022	2022 Namibia Tri-Nation Series (round 18)				—N/a
3 December 2022	2022 Malaysia Cricket World Cup Challenge League A				—N/a
14 February 2023	2023 Nepal Tri-Nation Series (round 19)				—N/a
27 February 2023	2023 United Arab Emirates Tri-Nation Series				—N/a
9 March 2023	2023 Nepal Tri-Nation Series (round 21)				—N/a
26 March 2023	(Namibia) 2023 Cricket World Cup Qualifier Play-off				United States

Women's international tours
Start date	Home team	Away team	Results [Matches]		
Start date	Home team	Away team	WTest	WODI	WT20I
19 September 2022	West Indies	New Zealand	—	1–2 [3]	1–4 [5]
4 November 2022	Pakistan	Ireland	—	3–0 [3]	1–2 [3]
20 November 2022	Thailand	Netherlands	—	4–0 [4]	3–1 [4]
2 December 2022	New Zealand	Bangladesh	—	1–0 [3]	3–0 [3]
4 December 2022	West Indies	England	—	0–3 [3]	0–5 [5]
9 December 2022	India	Australia	—	—	1–4 [5]
16 January 2023	Australia	Pakistan	—	3–0 [3]	2–0 [3]
19 April 2023	Thailand	Zimbabwe	—	3–0 [3]	2–1 [3]
Women's international tournaments
Start date	Tournament			Winners	
1 October 2022	(Bangladesh) 2022 Women's Twenty20 Asia Cup			India	
14 January 2023	(South Africa) 2023 ICC Under-19 Women's T20 World Cup			India	
19 January 2023	2022–23 South Africa women's Tri-Nation Series			South Africa	
10 February 2023	(South Africa) 2023 ICC Women's T20 World Cup			Australia	

== Rankings ==
The following were the rankings at the beginning of the season.

ICC Men's Test Team Rankings 1 September 2022
Rank	Team	Matches	Points	Rating
1	Australia	19	2,439	128
2	India	29	3,318	114
3	South Africa	21	2,306	110
4	England	39	3,909	100
5	New Zealand	27	2,704	100
6	Pakistan	23	2,111	92
7	Sri Lanka	23	1,916	83
8	West Indies	25	1,988	80
9	Bangladesh	22	1,047	48
10	Zimbabwe	6	148	25

ICC Men's ODI Team Rankings 1 September 2022
Rank	Team	Matches	Points	Rating
1	New Zealand	19	2,355	124
2	England	27	3,226	119
3	India	31	3,447	111
4	Pakistan	22	2,354	107
5	Australia	25	2,548	102
6	South Africa	21	2,111	101
7	Bangladesh	30	2,753	92
8	Sri Lanka	29	2,658	92
9	West Indies	41	2,902	71
10	Afghanistan	18	1,238	69
11	Ireland	23	1,214	53
12	Scotland	27	1,254	46
13	Zimbabwe	25	973	39
14	Netherlands	21	673	32
15	United Arab Emirates	22	697	32
16	United States	23	725	32
Only the top 16 teams are shown

ICC Men's T20I Team Rankings 1 September 2022
Rank	Team	Matches	Points	Rating
1	India	45	12,186	271
2	England	34	8,907	262
3	Pakistan	31	8,046	260
4	South Africa	34	8,787	258
5	New Zealand	38	9,595	252
6	Australia	36	9,009	250
7	West Indies	46	11,093	241
8	Sri Lanka	37	8,476	224
9	Bangladesh	39	8,754	224
10	Afghanistan	24	5,319	222
11	Zimbabwe	39	7,555	194
12	Ireland	47	8,805	187
13	United Arab Emirates	24	4,428	185
14	Namibia	29	5,321	183
15	Scotland	21	3,820	182
16	Nepal	30	5,387	180
Only the top 16 teams are shown

ICC Women's ODI Rankings 1 September 2022
Rank	Team	Matches	Points	Rating
1	Australia	29	4,837	167
2	England	33	4,046	123
3	South Africa	35	4,157	119
4	India	32	3,219	101
5	New Zealand	31	3,019	97
6	West Indies	30	2,768	92
7	Bangladesh	12	930	78
8	Pakistan	30	1,962	65
9	Ireland	11	516	47
10	Sri Lanka	11	495	45

ICC Women's T20I Rankings 1 September 2022
Rank	Team	Matches	Points	Rating
1	Australia	27	8,011	297
2	England	34	9,628	283
3	New Zealand	23	6,193	262
4	India	31	8,120	247
5	West Indies	19	4,691	247
6	South Africa	29	7,121	246
7	Pakistan	24	5,454	227
8	Sri Lanka	21	4,251	202
9	Bangladesh	15	2,850	190
10	Thailand	17	2,851	168
11	Ireland	26	4,228	163
12	Zimbabwe	24	3,803	158
13	Scotland	20	3,036	152
14	United Arab Emirates	24	3,263	136
15	Papua New Guinea	9	1,174	130
16	Samoa	6	749	125
Only the top 16 teams are shown

=== On-going tournaments ===
The following were the rankings at the beginning of the season.

2021–2023 ICC World Test Championship
Rank	Team	Series	PCT
1	Australia	3	70.00%
2	South Africa	4	60.00%
3	Sri Lanka	5	53.33%
4	India	4	52.08%
5	Pakistan	4	51.85%
6	West Indies	4	50.00%
7	England	5	38.60%
8	New Zealand	4	25.93%
9	Bangladesh	5	13.33%
Full Table

2020–2023 ICC Cricket World Cup Super League
Rank	Team	Matches	Points
1	India	18	129
2	England	18	125
3	Bangladesh	18	120
4	Pakistan	18	120
5	New Zealand	15	110
6	Afghanistan	12	100
7	Australia	15	90
8	West Indies	24	88
9	Ireland	21	68
10	Sri Lanka	18	62
11	South Africa	13	49
12	Zimbabwe	21	45
13	Netherlands	19	25
Full Table

2019–2023 ICC Cricket World Cup League 2
Rank	Team	Matches	Points
1	Oman	36	44
2	Scotland	28	40
3	United States	28	28
4	United Arab Emirates	26	27
5	Namibia	18	18
6	Nepal	20	18
7	Papua New Guinea	20	2
Full Table

2019–22 ICC Cricket World Cup Challenge League
League A
Rank	Team	Matches	Points
1	Canada	10	18
2	Singapore	10	14
3	Denmark	10	12
4	Qatar	10	10
5	Vanuatu	10	4
6	Malaysia	10	2
Full Table

2022–2025 ICC Women's Championship
Rank	Team	Matches	Points
1	India	3	6
2	South Africa	3	6
3	Pakistan	3	4
4	Sri Lanka	6	2
5	Ireland	3	0
6	Australia	0	0
7	England	0	0
8	West Indies	0	0
9	Bangladesh	0	0
10	New Zealand	0	0
Full Table

== September ==
=== New Zealand in Australia ===
2020–2023 ICC Cricket World Cup Super League, Chappell–Hadlee Trophy – ODI series
No.	Date	Home captain	Away captain	Venue	Result
ODI 4461	6 September	Aaron Finch	Kane Williamson	Cazalys Stadium, Cairns	Australia by 2 wickets
ODI 4462	8 September	Aaron Finch	Kane Williamson	Cazalys Stadium, Cairns	Australia by 113 runs
ODI 4464	11 September	Aaron Finch	Kane Williamson	Cazalys Stadium, Cairns	Australia by 25 runs

=== 2022 Papua New Guinea Tri-Nation Series (round 16) ===
2019–2023 ICC Cricket World Cup League 2 – Tri-series
No.	Date	Team 1	Captain 1	Team 2	Captain 2	Venue	Result
ODI 4463	11 September 2022	Papua New Guinea	Assad Vala	United States	Monank Patel	Amini Park, Port Moresby	Match tied
ODI 4465	13 September 2022	Papua New Guinea	Assad Vala	United States	Monank Patel	Amini Park, Port Moresby	Papua New Guinea by 26 runs
ODI 4466	15 September 2022	Namibia	Gerhard Erasmus	United States	Monank Patel	Amini Park, Port Moresby	Namibia by 79 runs
ODI 4467	17 September 2022	Namibia	Gerhard Erasmus	United States	Monank Patel	Amini Park, Port Moresby	Namibia by 68 runs
ODI 4468	20 September 2022	Papua New Guinea	Assad Vala	Namibia	Gerhard Erasmus	Amini Park, Port Moresby	Namibia by 167 runs
ODI 4469	21 September 2022	Papua New Guinea	Assad Vala	Namibia	Gerhard Erasmus	Amini Park, Port Moresby	Namibia by 61 runs

=== New Zealand women in the West Indies ===
2022–2025 ICC Women's Championship – WODI Series
No.	Date	Home captain	Away captain	Venue	Result
WODI 1291	19 September	Hayley Matthews	Sophie Devine	Sir Vivian Richards Stadium, North Sound	New Zealand by 5 runs (DLS)
WODI 1293	22 September	Hayley Matthews	Sophie Devine	Sir Vivian Richards Stadium, North Sound	New Zealand by 2 wickets
WODI 1295	25 September	Hayley Matthews	Sophie Devine	Sir Vivian Richards Stadium, North Sound	West Indies by 4 wickets
WT20I series
No.	Date	Home captain	Away captain	Venue	Result
WT20I 1238	28 September	Hayley Matthews	Sophie Devine	Sir Vivian Richards Stadium, North Sound	West Indies by 1 run
WT20I 1241	1 October	Hayley Matthews	Sophie Devine	Sir Vivian Richards Stadium, North Sound	New Zealand by 6 wickets
WT20I 1244	2 October	Hayley Matthews	Sophie Devine	Sir Vivian Richards Stadium, North Sound	New Zealand by 5 wickets
WT20I 1258	5 October	Hayley Matthews	Sophie Devine	Sir Vivian Richards Stadium, North Sound	Match tied (New Zealand won S/O)
WT20I 1265	6 October	Hayley Matthews	Sophie Devine	Sir Vivian Richards Stadium, North Sound	New Zealand by 5 wickets

=== Australia in India ===
T20I series
No.	Date	Home captain	Away captain	Venue	Result
T20I 1788	20 September	Rohit Sharma	Aaron Finch	I. S. Bindra Stadium, Mohali	Australia by 4 wickets
T20I 1794	23 September	Rohit Sharma	Aaron Finch	Vidarbha Cricket Association Stadium, Nagpur	India by 6 wickets
T20I 1796	25 September	Rohit Sharma	Aaron Finch	Rajiv Gandhi International Cricket Stadium, Hyderabad	India by 6 wickets
2021–2023 ICC World Test Championship – Test series
No.	Date	Home captain	Away captain	Venue	Result
Test 2490	9–13 February	Rohit Sharma	Pat Cummins	Vidarbha Cricket Association Stadium, Nagpur	India by an innings and 132 runs
Test 2493	17–21 February	Rohit Sharma	Pat Cummins	Arun Jaitley Cricket Stadium, Delhi	India by 6 wickets
Test 2496	1–5 March	Rohit Sharma	Steve Smith	Holkar Stadium, Indore	Australia by 9 wickets
Test 2499	9–13 March	Rohit Sharma	Steve Smith	Narendra Modi Stadium, Ahmedabad	Match drawn
ODI series
No.	Date	Home captain	Away captain	Venue	Result
ODI 4538	17 March	Hardik Pandya	Steve Smith	Wankhede Stadium, Mumbai	India by 5 wickets
ODI 4541	19 March	Rohit Sharma	Steve Smith	ACA–VDCA Cricket Stadium, Visakhapatnam	Australia by 10 wickets
ODI 4545	22 March	Rohit Sharma	Steve Smith	M. A. Chidambaram Stadium, Chennai	Australia by 21 runs

=== England in Pakistan ===
T20I series
No.	Date	Home captain	Away captain	Venue	Result
T20I 1789	20 September	Babar Azam	Moeen Ali	National Stadium, Karachi	England by 6 wickets
T20I 1793	22 September	Babar Azam	Moeen Ali	National Stadium, Karachi	Pakistan by 10 wickets
T20I 1795	23 September	Babar Azam	Moeen Ali	National Stadium, Karachi	England by 63 runs
T20I 1798	25 September	Babar Azam	Moeen Ali	National Stadium, Karachi	Pakistan by 3 runs
T20I 1801	28 September	Babar Azam	Moeen Ali	Gaddafi Stadium, Lahore	Pakistan by 6 runs
T20I 1802	30 September	Babar Azam	Moeen Ali	Gaddafi Stadium, Lahore	England by 8 wickets
T20I 1804	2 October	Babar Azam	Moeen Ali	Gaddafi Stadium, Lahore	England by 67 runs
2021–2023 ICC World Test Championship – Test Series
No.	Date	Home Captain	Away Captain	Venue	Result
Test 2478	1–5 December	Babar Azam	Ben Stokes	Rawalpindi Cricket Stadium, Rawalpindi	England by 74 runs
Test 2480	9–13 December	Babar Azam	Ben Stokes	Multan Cricket Stadium, Multan	England by 26 runs
Test 2483	17–21 December	Babar Azam	Ben Stokes	National Stadium, Karachi	England by 8 wickets

=== Bangladesh in the UAE ===
T20I series
No.	Date	Home captain	Away captain	Venue	Result
T20I 1797	25 September	Chundangapoyil Rizwan	Nurul Hasan	Dubai International Cricket Stadium, Dubai	Bangladesh by 7 runs
T20I 1799	27 September	Chundangapoyil Rizwan	Nurul Hasan	Dubai International Cricket Stadium, Dubai	Bangladesh by 32 runs

=== South Africa in India ===
T20I series
No.	Date	Home captain	Away captain	Venue	Result
T20I 1800	28 September	Rohit Sharma	Temba Bavuma	The Sports Hub, Thiruvananthapuram	India by 8 wickets
T20I 1803	2 October	Rohit Sharma	Temba Bavuma	Assam Cricket Association Stadium, Guwahati	India by 16 runs
T20I 1805	4 October	Rohit Sharma	Temba Bavuma	Holkar Stadium, Indore	South Africa by 49 runs
2020–2023 ICC Cricket World Cup Super League – ODI series
No.	Date	Home captain	Away captain	Venue	Result
ODI 4470	6 October	Shikhar Dhawan	Temba Bavuma	Ekana Cricket Stadium, Lucknow	South Africa by 9 runs
ODI 4471	9 October	Shikhar Dhawan	Keshav Maharaj	JSCA International Stadium Complex, Ranchi	India by 7 wickets
ODI 4472	11 October	Shikhar Dhawan	David Miller	Arun Jaitley Cricket Stadium, Delhi	India by 7 wickets

== October ==
=== 2022 Women's Twenty20 Asia Cup ===
Pos	Team	Pld	W	L	NR	Pts	NRR
1	India	6	5	1	0	10	3.141
2	Pakistan	6	5	1	0	10	1.806
3	Sri Lanka	6	4	2	0	8	0.888
4	Thailand	6	3	3	0	6	−0.949
5	Bangladesh	6	2	3	1	5	0.423
6	United Arab Emirates	6	1	4	1	3	−2.181
7	Malaysia	6	0	6	0	0	−3.002

Source: ESPN Cricinfo

Round-robin
No.	Date	Team 1	Captain 1	Team 2	Captain 2	Venue	Result
WT20I 1239	1 October	Bangladesh	Nigar Sultana	Thailand	Naruemol Chaiwai	Sylhet International Cricket Stadium, Sylhet	Bangladesh by 9 wickets
WT20I 1240	1 October	India	Harmanpreet Kaur	Sri Lanka	Chamari Athapaththu	Sylhet International Cricket Stadium, Sylhet	India by 41 runs
WT20I 1242	2 October	Malaysia	Winifred Duraisingam	Pakistan	Bismah Maroof	Sylhet International Cricket Stadium, Sylhet	Pakistan by 9 wickets
WT20I 1243	2 October	Sri Lanka	Chamari Athapaththu	United Arab Emirates	Chaya Mughal	Sylhet International Cricket Stadium, Sylhet	Sri Lanka by 11 runs (DLS)
WT20I 1249	3 October	Bangladesh	Nigar Sultana	Pakistan	Bismah Maroof	Sylhet International Cricket Stadium, Sylhet	Pakistan by 9 wickets
WT20I 1250	3 October	India	Harmanpreet Kaur	Malaysia	Winifred Duraisingam	Sylhet International Cricket Stadium, Sylhet	India by 30 runs (DLS)
WT20I 1251	4 October	Sri Lanka	Chamari Athapaththu	Thailand	Naruemol Chaiwai	Sylhet International Cricket Stadium, Sylhet	Sri Lanka by 49 runs
WT20I 1252	4 October	India	Smriti Mandhana	United Arab Emirates	Chaya Mughal	Sylhet International Cricket Stadium, Sylhet	India by 104 runs
WT20I 1257	5 October	Malaysia	Winifred Duraisingam	United Arab Emirates	Chaya Mughal	Sylhet International Cricket Stadium, Sylhet	United Arab Emirates by 7 wickets
WT20I 1263	6 October	Pakistan	Bismah Maroof	Thailand	Naruemol Chaiwai	Sylhet International Cricket Stadium, Sylhet	Thailand by 4 wickets
WT20I 1264	6 October	Bangladesh	Nigar Sultana	Malaysia	Winifred Duraisingam	Sylhet International Cricket Stadium, Sylhet	Bangladesh by 88 runs
WT20I 1266	7 October	Thailand	Naruemol Chaiwai	United Arab Emirates	Chaya Mughal	Sylhet International Cricket Stadium, Sylhet	Thailand by 19 runs
WT20I 1267	7 October	India	Harmanpreet Kaur	Pakistan	Bismah Maroof	Sylhet International Cricket Stadium, Sylhet	Pakistan by 13 runs
WT20I 1268	8 October	Malaysia	Winifred Duraisingam	Sri Lanka	Chamari Athapaththu	Sylhet International Cricket Stadium, Sylhet	Sri Lanka by 72 runs
WT20I 1269	8 October	Bangladesh	Nigar Sultana	India	Smriti Mandhana	Sylhet International Cricket Stadium, Sylhet	India by 59 runs
WT20I 1270	9 October	Malaysia	Winifred Duraisingam	Thailand	Naruemol Chaiwai	Sylhet International Cricket Stadium, Sylhet	Thailand by 50 runs
WT20I 1271	9 October	Pakistan	Bismah Maroof	United Arab Emirates	Chaya Mughal	Sylhet International Cricket Stadium, Sylhet	Pakistan by 71 runs
WT20I 1272	10 October	Bangladesh	Nigar Sultana	Sri Lanka	Chamari Athapaththu	Sylhet International Cricket Stadium, Sylhet	Sri Lanka by 3 runs (DLS)
WT20I 1273	10 October	India	Smriti Mandhana	Thailand	Naruemol Chaiwai	Sylhet International Cricket Stadium, Sylhet	India by 9 wickets
WT20I 1273a	11 October	Bangladesh	Nigar Sultana	United Arab Emirates	Chaya Mughal	Sylhet International Cricket Stadium, Sylhet	Match abandoned
WT20I 1274	11 October	Pakistan	Bismah Maroof	Sri Lanka	Chamari Athapaththu	Sylhet International Cricket Stadium, Sylhet	Pakistan by 5 wickets
Play-offs
No.	Date	Team 1	Captain 1	Team 2	Captain 2	Venue	Result
WT20I 1275	13 October	India	Harmanpreet Kaur	Thailand	Naruemol Chaiwai	Sylhet International Cricket Stadium, Sylhet	India by 74 runs
WT20I 1276	13 October	Pakistan	Bismah Maroof	Sri Lanka	Chamari Athapaththu	Sylhet International Cricket Stadium, Sylhet	Sri Lanka by 1 run
WT20I 1279	15 October	India	Harmanpreet Kaur	Sri Lanka	Chamari Athapaththu	Sylhet International Cricket Stadium, Sylhet	India by 8 wickets

=== West Indies in Australia ===
T20I series
No.	Date	Home captain	Away captain	Venue	Result
T20I 1806	5 October	Aaron Finch	Nicholas Pooran	Carrara Stadium, Gold Coast	Australia by 3 wickets
T20I 1808	7 October	Aaron Finch	Nicholas Pooran	The Gabba, Brisbane	Australia by 31 runs
2021–2023 ICC World Test Championship – Test series
No.	Date	Home captain	Away captain	Venue	Result
Test 2477	30 November–4 December	Pat Cummins	Kraigg Brathwaite	Perth Stadium, Perth	Australia by 164 runs
Test 2479	8–12 December	Steve Smith	Kraigg Brathwaite	Adelaide Oval, Adelaide	Australia by 419 runs

=== 2022–23 New Zealand Tri-Nation Series ===
Pos	Team	Pld	W	L	T	NR	Pts	NRR
1	New Zealand	4	3	1	0	0	6	1.133
2	Pakistan	4	3	1	0	0	6	0.132
3	Bangladesh	4	0	4	0	0	0	−1.236

Source: ESPNcricinfo

Round-robin
No.	Date	Team 1	Captain 1	Team 2	Captain 2	Venue	Result
T20I 1807	7 October	Bangladesh	Nurul Hasan	Pakistan	Babar Azam	Hagley Oval, Christchurch	Pakistan by 21 runs
T20I 1809	8 October	New Zealand	Kane Williamson	Pakistan	Babar Azam	Hagley Oval, Christchurch	Pakistan by 6 wickets
T20I 1811	9 October	New Zealand	Kane Williamson	Bangladesh	Shakib Al Hasan	Hagley Oval, Christchurch	New Zealand by 8 wickets
T20I 1815	11 October	New Zealand	Kane Williamson	Pakistan	Babar Azam	Hagley Oval, Christchurch	New Zealand by 9 wickets
T20I 1816	12 October	New Zealand	Tim Southee	Bangladesh	Shakib Al Hasan	Hagley Oval, Christchurch	New Zealand by 48 runs
T20I 1818	13 October	Bangladesh	Shakib Al Hasan	Pakistan	Babar Azam	Hagley Oval, Christchurch	Pakistan by 7 wickets
Final
No.	Date	Team 1	Captain 1	Team 2	Captain 2	Venue	Result
T20I 1819	14 October	New Zealand	Kane Williamson	Pakistan	Babar Azam	Hagley Oval, Christchurch	Pakistan by 5 wickets

=== England in Australia ===
T20I series
No.	Date	Home captain	Away captain	Venue	Result
T20I 1812	9 October	Aaron Finch	Jos Buttler	Perth Stadium, Perth	England by 8 runs
T20I 1817	12 October	Aaron Finch	Jos Buttler	Manuka Oval, Canberra	England by 8 runs
T20I 1820	14 October	Aaron Finch	Jos Buttler	Manuka Oval, Canberra	No result
ODI series
No.	Date	Home captain	Away captain	Venue	Result
ODI 4475	17 November	Pat Cummins	Jos Buttler	Adelaide Oval, Adelaide	Australia by 6 wickets
ODI 4477	19 November	Josh Hazlewood	Moeen Ali	Sydney Cricket Ground, Sydney	Australia by 72 runs
ODI 4480	22 November	Pat Cummins	Jos Buttler	Melbourne Cricket Ground, Melbourne	Australia by 221 runs (DLS)

=== 2022 ICC Men's T20 World Cup ===
Pos	Team	Pld	W	L	NR	Pts	NRR	Qualification
1	Sri Lanka	3	2	1	0	4	0.667	Advanced to Super 12
2	Netherlands	3	2	1	0	4	−0.162	Advanced to Super 12
3	Namibia	3	1	2	0	2	0.730	
4	United Arab Emirates	3	1	2	0	2	−1.235	

Source: ESPNcricinfo

Pos	Team	Pld	W	L	NR	Pts	NRR	Qualification
1	Zimbabwe	3	2	1	0	4	0.200	Advanced to Super 12
2	Ireland	3	2	1	0	4	0.105	Advanced to Super 12
3	Scotland	3	1	2	0	2	0.304	
4	West Indies	3	1	2	0	2	−0.563	

Source: ESPNcricinfo

Group stage
No.	Date	Team 1	Captain 1	Team 2	Captain 2	Venue	Result
T20I 1823	16 October	Namibia	Gerhard Erasmus	Sri Lanka	Dasun Shanaka	Kardinia Park, Geelong	Namibia by 55 runs
T20I 1825	16 October	Netherlands	Scott Edwards	United Arab Emirates	Chundangapoyil Rizwan	Kardinia Park, Geelong	Netherlands by 3 wickets
T20I 1826	17 October	Scotland	Richie Berrington	West Indies	Nicholas Pooran	Bellerive Oval, Hobart	Scotland by 42 runs
T20I 1828	17 October	Ireland	Andrew Balbirnie	Zimbabwe	Craig Ervine	Bellerive Oval, Hobart	Zimbabwe by 31 runs
T20I 1830	18 October	Namibia	Gerhard Erasmus	Netherlands	Scott Edwards	Kardinia Park, Geelong	Netherlands by 5 wickets
T20I 1832	18 October	Sri Lanka	Dasun Shanaka	United Arab Emirates	Chundangapoyil Rizwan	Kardinia Park, Geelong	Sri Lanka by 79 runs
T20I 1833	19 October	Ireland	Andrew Balbirnie	Scotland	Richie Berrington	Bellerive Oval, Hobart	Ireland by 6 wickets
T20I 1834	19 October	West Indies	Nicholas Pooran	Zimbabwe	Regis Chakabva	Bellerive Oval, Hobart	West Indies by 31 runs
T20I 1835	20 October	Netherlands	Scott Edwards	Sri Lanka	Dasun Shanaka	Kardinia Park, Geelong	Sri Lanka by 16 runs
T20I 1836	20 October	Namibia	Gerhard Erasmus	United Arab Emirates	Chundangapoyil Rizwan	Kardinia Park, Geelong	United Arab Emirates by 7 runs
T20I 1837	21 October	Ireland	Andrew Balbirnie	West Indies	Nicholas Pooran	Bellerive Oval, Hobart	Ireland by 9 wickets
T20I 1838	21 October	Scotland	Richie Berrington	Zimbabwe	Craig Ervine	Bellerive Oval, Hobart	Zimbabwe by 5 wickets

==== Super 12 ====
Pos	Team	Pld	W	L	NR	Pts	NRR	Qualification
1	New Zealand	5	3	1	1	7	2.113	Advanced to knockout stage and 2024 Men's T20 World Cup
2	England	5	3	1	1	7	0.473	Advanced to knockout stage and 2024 Men's T20 World Cup
3	Australia	5	3	1	1	7	−0.173	Qualified for 2024 Men's T20 World Cup
4	Sri Lanka	5	2	3	0	4	−0.422	Qualified for 2024 Men's T20 World Cup
5	Ireland	5	1	3	1	3	−1.615	
6	Afghanistan	5	0	3	2	2	−0.571	

Source: ESPN Cricinfo

Pos	Team	Pld	W	L	NR	Pts	NRR	Qualification
1	India	5	4	1	0	8	1.319	Advanced to knockout stage and 2024 Men's T20 World Cup
2	Pakistan	5	3	2	0	6	1.028	Advanced to knockout stage and 2024 Men's T20 World Cup
3	South Africa	5	2	2	1	5	0.874	Qualified for 2024 Men's T20 World Cup
4	Netherlands	5	2	3	0	4	−0.849	Qualified for 2024 Men's T20 World Cup
5	Bangladesh	5	2	3	0	4	−1.176	
6	Zimbabwe	5	1	3	1	3	−1.138	

Source: ESPN Cricinfo

Super 12
No.	Date	Team 1	Captain 1	Team 2	Captain 2	Venue	Result
T20I 1839	22 October	Australia	Aaron Finch	New Zealand	Kane Williamson	Sydney Cricket Ground, Sydney	New Zealand by 89 runs
T20I 1840	22 October	Afghanistan	Mohammad Nabi	England	Jos Buttler	Perth Stadium, Perth	England by 5 wickets
T20I 1841	23 October	Ireland	Andrew Balbirnie	Sri Lanka	Dasun Shanaka	Bellerive Oval, Hobart	Sri Lanka by 9 wickets
T20I 1842	23 October	India	Rohit Sharma	Pakistan	Babar Azam	Melbourne Cricket Ground, Melbourne	India by 4 wickets
T20I 1843	24 October	Bangladesh	Shakib Al Hasan	Netherlands	Scott Edwards	Bellerive Oval, Hobart	Bangladesh by 9 runs
T20I 1844	24 October	South Africa	Temba Bavuma	Zimbabwe	Craig Ervine	Bellerive Oval, Hobart	No result
T20I 1845	25 October	Australia	Aaron Finch	Sri Lanka	Dasun Shanaka	Perth Stadium, Perth	Australia by 7 wickets
T20I 1846	26 October	England	Jos Buttler	Ireland	Andrew Balbirnie	Melbourne Cricket Ground, Melbourne	Ireland by 5 runs (DLS)
T20I 1846a	26 October	Afghanistan	Mohammad Nabi	New Zealand	Kane Williamson	Melbourne Cricket Ground, Melbourne	Match abandoned
T20I 1847	27 October	Bangladesh	Shakib Al Hasan	South Africa	Temba Bavuma	Sydney Cricket Ground, Sydney	South Africa by 104 runs
T20I 1848	27 October	India	Rohit Sharma	Netherlands	Scott Edwards	Sydney Cricket Ground, Sydney	India by 56 runs
T20I 1849	27 October	Pakistan	Babar Azam	Zimbabwe	Craig Ervine	Perth Stadium, Perth	Zimbabwe by 1 run
T20I 1849a	28 October	Afghanistan	Mohammad Nabi	Ireland	Andrew Balbirnie	Melbourne Cricket Ground, Melbourne	Match abandoned
T20I 1849b	28 October	Australia	Aaron Finch	England	Jos Buttler	Melbourne Cricket Ground, Melbourne	Match abandoned
T20I 1850	29 October	New Zealand	Kane Williamson	Sri Lanka	Dasun Shanaka	Sydney Cricket Ground, Sydney	New Zealand by 65 runs
T20I 1851	30 October	Bangladesh	Shakib Al Hasan	Zimbabwe	Craig Ervine	The Gabba, Brisbane	Bangladesh by 3 runs
T20I 1852	30 October	Netherlands	Scott Edwards	Pakistan	Babar Azam	Perth Stadium, Perth	Pakistan by 6 wickets
T20I 1853	30 October	India	Rohit Sharma	South Africa	Temba Bavuma	Perth Stadium, Perth	South Africa by 5 wickets
T20I 1855	31 October	Australia	Aaron Finch	Ireland	Andrew Balbirnie	The Gabba, Brisbane	Australia by 42 runs
T20I 1856	1 November	Afghanistan	Mohammad Nabi	Sri Lanka	Dasun Shanaka	The Gabba, Brisbane	Sri Lanka by 6 wickets
T20I 1858	1 November	England	Jos Buttler	New Zealand	Kane Williamson	The Gabba, Brisbane	England by 20 runs
T20I 1859	2 November	Netherlands	Scott Edwards	Zimbabwe	Craig Ervine	Adelaide Oval, Adelaide	Netherlands by 5 wickets
T20I 1860	2 November	Bangladesh	Shakib Al Hasan	India	Rohit Sharma	Adelaide Oval, Adelaide	India by 5 runs (DLS)
T20I 1861	3 November	Pakistan	Babar Azam	South Africa	Temba Bavuma	Sydney Cricket Ground, Sydney	Pakistan by 33 runs (DLS)
T20I 1862	4 November	Ireland	Andrew Balbirnie	New Zealand	Kane Williamson	Adelaide Oval, Adelaide	New Zealand by 35 runs
T20I 1864	4 November	Afghanistan	Mohammad Nabi	Australia	Matthew Wade	Adelaide Oval, Adelaide	Australia by 4 runs
T20I 1867	5 November	England	Jos Buttler	Sri Lanka	Dasun Shanaka	Sydney Cricket Ground, Sydney	England by 4 wickets
T20I 1871	6 November	Netherlands	Scott Edwards	South Africa	Temba Bavuma	Adelaide Oval, Adelaide	Netherlands by 13 runs
T20I 1872	6 November	Bangladesh	Shakib Al Hasan	Pakistan	Babar Azam	Adelaide Oval, Adelaide	Pakistan by 5 wickets
T20I 1873	6 November	India	Rohit Sharma	Zimbabwe	Craig Ervine	Melbourne Cricket Ground, Melbourne	India by 71 runs

==== Finals ====
Semi-Finals
No.	Date	Team 1	Captain 1	Team 2	Captain 2	Venue	Result
T20I 1877	9 November	New Zealand	Kane Williamson	Pakistan	Babar Azam	Sydney Cricket Ground, Sydney	Pakistan by 7 wickets
T20I 1878	10 November	England	Jos Buttler	India	Rohit Sharma	Adelaide Oval, Adelaide	England by 10 wickets
Final
T20I 1879	13 November	England	Jos Buttler	Pakistan	Babar Azam	Melbourne Cricket Ground, Melbourne	England by 5 wickets

== November ==
=== Ireland women in Pakistan ===
2022–2025 ICC Women's Championship – WODI series
No.	Date	Home captain	Away captain	Venue	Result
WODI 1296	4 November	Bismah Maroof	Laura Delany	Gaddafi Stadium, Lahore	Pakistan by 128 runs
WODI 1297	6 November	Bismah Maroof	Laura Delany	Gaddafi Stadium, Lahore	Pakistan by 9 wickets
WODI 1298	9 November	Bismah Maroof	Laura Delany	Gaddafi Stadium, Lahore	Pakistan by 5 wickets
WT20I series
No.	Date	Home captain	Away captain	Venue	Result
WT20I 1293	12 November	Bismah Maroof	Laura Delany	Gaddafi Stadium, Lahore	Ireland by 6 wickets
WT20I 1300	14 November	Bismah Maroof	Laura Delany	Gaddafi Stadium, Lahore	Pakistan by 6 wickets
WT20I 1304	16 November	Bismah Maroof	Laura Delany	Gaddafi Stadium, Lahore	Ireland by 34 runs

=== United Arab Emirates in Nepal ===
ODI series
No.	Date	Home captain	Away captain	Venue	Result
ODI 4473	14 November	Rohit Paudel	Chundangapoyil Rizwan	Tribhuvan University International Cricket Ground, Kirtipur	United Arab Emirates by 84 runs
ODI 4474	16 November	Rohit Paudel	Chundangapoyil Rizwan	Tribhuvan University International Cricket Ground, Kirtipur	Nepal by 3 wickets
ODI 4476	18 November	Rohit Paudel	Chundangapoyil Rizwan	Tribhuvan University International Cricket Ground, Kirtipur	Nepal by 6 wickets

=== India in New Zealand ===
T20I series
No.	Date	Home captain	Away captain	Venue	Result
T20I 1891a	18 November	Kane Williamson	Hardik Pandya	Wellington Regional Stadium, Wellington	Match abandoned
T20I 1898	20 November	Kane Williamson	Hardik Pandya	Bay Oval, Mount Maunganui	India by 65 runs
T20I 1911	22 November	Tim Southee	Hardik Pandya	McLean Park, Napier	Match tied (DLS)
2020–2023 ICC Cricket World Cup Super League – ODI series
No.	Date	Home captain	Away captain	Venue	Result
ODI 4483	25 November	Kane Williamson	Shikhar Dhawan	Eden Park, Auckland	New Zealand by 7 wickets
ODI 4487	27 November	Kane Williamson	Shikhar Dhawan	Seddon Park, Hamilton	No result
ODI 4489	30 November	Kane Williamson	Shikhar Dhawan	Hagley Oval, Christchurch	No result

=== 2022 Namibia Tri-Nation Series (round 17) ===
2019–2023 ICC Cricket World Cup League 2 – Tri-series
No.	Date	Team 1	Captain 1	Team 2	Captain 2	Venue	Result
ODI 4478	19 November	Namibia	Gerhard Erasmus	Papua New Guinea	Assad Vala	Wanderers Cricket Ground, Windhoek	Namibia by 8 wickets
ODI 4479	20 November	Namibia	Gerhard Erasmus	United States	Monank Patel	Wanderers Cricket Ground, Windhoek	United States by 71 runs
ODI 4481	22 November	Papua New Guinea	Assad Vala	United States	Monank Patel	Wanderers Cricket Ground, Windhoek	United States by 6 wickets
ODI 4482	23 November	Namibia	Gerhard Erasmus	Papua New Guinea	Assad Vala	Wanderers Cricket Ground, Windhoek	Namibia by 3 wickets
ODI 4484	25 November	Papua New Guinea	Assad Vala	United States	Monank Patel	Wanderers Cricket Ground, Windhoek	United States by 35 runs
ODI 4486	26 November	Namibia	Gerhard Erasmus	United States	Monank Patel	Wanderers Cricket Ground, Windhoek	Namibia by 6 wickets

=== Netherlands women in Thailand ===
WODI series
No.	Date	Home captain	Away captain	Venue	Result
WODI 1299	20 November	Naruemol Chaiwai	Heather Siegers	Royal Chiangmai Golf Club, Mae Faek	Thailand by 100 runs (DLS)
WODI 1300	22 November	Naruemol Chaiwai	Heather Siegers	Royal Chiangmai Golf Club, Mae Faek	Thailand by 8 runs
WODI 1301	24 November	Naruemol Chaiwai	Heather Siegers	Royal Chiangmai Golf Club, Mae Faek	Thailand by 99 runs
WODI 1302	26 November	Naruemol Chaiwai	Babette de Leede	Royal Chiangmai Golf Club, Mae Faek	Thailand by 7 wickets
WT20I series
No.	Date	Home captain	Away captain	Venue	Result
WT20I 1305	29 November	Naruemol Chaiwai	Babette de Leede	Royal Chiangmai Golf Club, Mae Faek	Thailand by 10 wickets
WT20I 1306	30 November	Naruemol Chaiwai	Heather Siegers	Royal Chiangmai Golf Club, Mae Faek	Netherlands by 5 wickets
WT20I 1307	2 December	Naruemol Chaiwai	Heather Siegers	Royal Chiangmai Golf Club, Mae Faek	Thailand by 5 wickets
WT20I 1309	3 December	Naruemol Chaiwai	Heather Siegers	Royal Chiangmai Golf Club, Mae Faek	Thailand by 31 runs

=== Afghanistan in Sri Lanka ===
2020–2023 ICC Cricket World Cup Super League – ODI series
No.	Date	Home captain	Away captain	Venue	Result
ODI 4485	25 November	Dasun Shanaka	Hashmatullah Shahidi	Pallekele International Cricket Stadium, Pallekele	Afghanistan by 60 runs
ODI 4488	27 November	Dasun Shanaka	Hashmatullah Shahidi	Pallekele International Cricket Stadium, Pallekele	No result
ODI 4490	30 November	Dasun Shanaka	Hashmatullah Shahidi	Pallekele International Cricket Stadium, Pallekele	Sri Lanka by 4 wickets

== December ==
=== 2022 Namibia Tri-Nation Series (round 18) ===
2019–2023 ICC Cricket World Cup League 2 – Tri-series
No.	Date	Team 1	Captain 1	Team 2	Captain 2	Venue	Result
ODI 4491	1 December	Namibia	Gerhard Erasmus	Scotland	Richie Berrington	United Ground, Windhoek	Scotland by 4 wickets
ODI 4492	2 December	Namibia	Gerhard Erasmus	Nepal	Rohit Paudel	United Ground, Windhoek	No result
ODI 4494	4 December	Nepal	Rohit Paudel	Scotland	Richie Berrington	United Ground, Windhoek	Scotland by 3 wickets
ODI 4495	5 December	Namibia	Gerhard Erasmus	Scotland	Richie Berrington	United Ground, Windhoek	Namibia by 3 wickets
ODI 4497	7 December	Namibia	Gerhard Erasmus	Nepal	Rohit Paudel	United Ground, Windhoek	Namibia by 86 runs
ODI 4498	8 December	Nepal	Rohit Paudel	Scotland	Richie Berrington	United Ground, Windhoek	Scotland by 8 wickets

=== Bangladesh women in New Zealand ===
WT20I series
No.	Date	Home captain	Away captain	Venue	Result
WT20I 1308	2 December	Sophie Devine	Nigar Sultana	Hagley Oval, Christchurch	New Zealand by 132 runs
WT20I 1310	4 December	Sophie Devine	Nigar Sultana	University of Otago Oval, Dunedin	New Zealand by 37 runs
WT20I 1311	7 December	Sophie Devine	Nigar Sultana	John Davies Oval, Queenstown	New Zealand by 63 runs
2022–2025 ICC Women's Championship – WODI series
No.	Date	Home captain	Away captain	Venue	Result
WODI 1306	11 December	Sophie Devine	Nigar Sultana	Basin Reserve, Wellington	New Zealand by 8 wickets
WODI 1307	14 December	Sophie Devine	Nigar Sultana	McLean Park, Napier	No result
WODI 1308	17 December	Sophie Devine	Nigar Sultana	Seddon Park, Hamilton	No result

=== 2022 Malaysia Cricket World Cup Challenge League A ===
2019–2022 ICC Cricket World Cup Challenge League – List A series
No.	Date	Team 1	Captain 1	Team 2	Captain 2	Venue	Result
1st List A	3 December	Singapore	Amjad Mahboob	Vanuatu	Patrick Matautaava	Bayuemas Oval, Kuala Lumpur	Vanuatu by 21 runs
2nd List A	4 December	Malaysia	Ahmad Faiz	Denmark	Hamid Shah	Bayuemas Oval, Kuala Lumpur	Malaysia by 2 wickets
3rd List A	4 December	Canada	Saad Bin Zafar	Qatar	Mohammed Rizlan	UKM-YSD Cricket Oval, Bangi	Canada by 4 wickets
4th List A	6 December	Canada	Saad Bin Zafar	Singapore	Amjad Mahboob	Bayuemas Oval, Kuala Lumpur	Canada by 187 runs
5th List A	6 December	Malaysia	Ahmad Faiz	Vanuatu	Patrick Matautaava	UKM-YSD Cricket Oval, Bangi	Malaysia by 5 wickets
6th List A	7 December	Qatar	Mohammed Rizlan	Vanuatu	Patrick Matautaava	Bayuemas Oval, Kuala Lumpur	Qatar by 4 wickets
7th List A	7 December	Denmark	Hamid Shah	Singapore	Amjad Mahboob	UKM-YSD Cricket Oval, Bangi	Denmark by 2 wickets
8th List A	9 December	Canada	Saad Bin Zafar	Denmark	Hamid Shah	Bayuemas Oval, Kuala Lumpur	Canada by 7 wickets (DLS)
9th List A	9 December	Malaysia	Ahmed Faiz	Qatar	Mohammed Rizlan	UKM-YSD Cricket Oval, Bangi	Qatar by 121 runs
10th List A	10 December	Malaysia	Ahmad Faiz	Singapore	Amjad Mahboob	Bayuemas Oval, Kuala Lumpur	Malaysia by 34 runs (DLS)
11th List A	10 December	Denmark	Hamid Shah	Vanuatu	Patrick Matautaava	UKM-YSD Cricket Oval, Bangi	Denmark by 49 runs (DLS)
12th List A	12 December	Canada	Saad Bin Zafar	Vanuatu	Patrick Matautaava	Bayuemas Oval, Kuala Lumpur	Match abandoned
13th List A	12 December	Qatar	Mohammed Rizlan	Singapore	Janak Prakash	UKM-YSD Cricket Oval, Bangi	Qatar by 17 runs (DLS)
14th List A	13 December	Denmark	Hamid Shah	Qatar	Mohammed Rizlan	Bayuemas Oval, Kuala Lumpur	Match abandoned
15th List A	13 December	Canada	Saad Bin Zafar	Malaysia	Ahmad Faiz	UKM-YSD Cricket Oval, Bangi	Canada by 189 runs

=== India in Bangladesh ===
ODI series
No.	Date	Home captain	Away captain	Venue	Result
ODI 4493	4 December	Litton Das	Rohit Sharma	Sher-e-Bangla National Cricket Stadium, Mirpur	Bangladesh by 1 wicket
ODI 4496	7 December	Litton Das	Rohit Sharma	Sher-e-Bangla National Cricket Stadium, Mirpur	Bangladesh by 5 runs
ODI 4499	10 December	Litton Das	KL Rahul	Zohur Ahmed Chowdhury Stadium, Chattogram	India by 227 runs
2021–2023 ICC World Test Championship – Test series
No.	Date	Home captain	Away captain	Venue	Result
Test 2481	14–18 December	Shakib Al Hasan	KL Rahul	Zohur Ahmed Chowdhury Stadium, Chattogram	India by 188 runs
Test 2484	22–26 December	Shakib Al Hasan	KL Rahul	Sher-e-Bangla National Cricket Stadium, Mirpur	India by 3 wickets

=== England women in the West Indies ===
2022–2025 ICC Women's Championship – WODI Series
No.	Date	Home captain	Away captain	Venue	Result
WODI 1303	4 December	Hayley Matthews	Heather Knight	Sir Vivian Richards Stadium, North Sound	England by 142 runs
WODI 1304	6 December	Hayley Matthews	Heather Knight	Sir Vivian Richards Stadium, North Sound	England by 142 runs
WODI 1305	9 December	Hayley Matthews	Amy Jones	Sir Vivian Richards Stadium, North Sound	England by 151 runs
WT20I series
No.	Date	Home captain	Away captain	Venue	Result
WT20I 1314	11 December	Hayley Matthews	Heather Knight	Sir Vivian Richards Stadium, North Sound	England by 8 wickets
WT20I 1320	14 December	Hayley Matthews	Heather Knight	Kensington Oval, Bridgetown	England by 16 runs
WT20I 1326	17 December	Hayley Matthews	Heather Knight	Kensington Oval, Bridgetown	England by 17 runs
WT20I 1329	18 December	Hayley Matthews	Heather Knight	Kensington Oval, Bridgetown	England by 49 runs
WT20I 1339	22 December	Hayley Matthews	Heather Knight	Kensington Oval, Bridgetown	England by 8 wickets

=== Australia women in India ===
WT20I series
No.	Date	Home captain	Away captain	Venue	Result
WT20I 1312	9 December	Harmanpreet Kaur	Alyssa Healy	DY Patil Stadium, Mumbai	Australia by 9 wickets
WT20I 1313	11 December	Harmanpreet Kaur	Alyssa Healy	DY Patil Stadium, Mumbai	Match tied (India won S/O)
WT20I 1319	14 December	Harmanpreet Kaur	Alyssa Healy	Brabourne Stadium, Mumbai	Australia by 21 runs
WT20I 1325	17 December	Harmanpreet Kaur	Alyssa Healy	Brabourne Stadium, Mumbai	Australia by 7 runs
WT20I 1332	20 December	Harmanpreet Kaur	Tahlia McGrath	Brabourne Stadium, Mumbai	Australia by 54 runs

=== South Africa in Australia ===
In July 2022, South Africa withdrew from the three-match ODI series against Australia, after the fixtures clashed with their new domestic T20 league. The World Cup Super League points for the three matches were awarded to Australia.

2021–2023 ICC World Test Championship – Test series
No.	Date	Home captain	Away captain	Venue	Result
Test 2482	17–21 December	Pat Cummins	Dean Elgar	The Gabba, Brisbane	Australia by 6 wickets
Test 2485	26–30 December	Pat Cummins	Dean Elgar	Melbourne Cricket Ground, Melbourne	Australia by an innings and 182 runs
Test 2488	4–8 January	Pat Cummins	Dean Elgar	Sydney Cricket Ground, Sydney	Match drawn
2020–2023 ICC Cricket World Cup Super League – ODI series
No.	Date	Home captain	Away captain	Venue	Result
1st ODI	12 January			Bellerive Oval, Hobart	Match cancelled
2nd ODI	14 January			Sydney Cricket Ground, Sydney	Match cancelled
3rd ODI	17 January			Perth Stadium, Perth	Match cancelled

=== New Zealand in Pakistan (December 2022) ===
2021–2023 ICC World Test Championship – Test series
No.	Date	Home captain	Away captain	Venue	Result
Test 2486	26–30 December	Babar Azam	Tim Southee	National Bank Cricket Arena, Karachi	Match drawn
Test 2487	2–6 January	Babar Azam	Tim Southee	National Bank Cricket Arena, Karachi	Match drawn
2020–2023 ICC Cricket World Cup Super League – ODI series
No.	Date	Home captain	Away captain	Venue	Result
ODI 4500	9 January	Babar Azam	Kane Williamson	National Bank Cricket Arena, Karachi	Pakistan by 6 wickets
ODI 4502	11 January	Babar Azam	Kane Williamson	National Bank Cricket Arena, Karachi	New Zealand by 79 runs
ODI 4504	13 January	Babar Azam	Kane Williamson	National Bank Cricket Arena, Karachi	New Zealand by 2 wickets

== January ==
=== Sri Lanka in India ===
T20I series
No.	Date	Home captain	Away captain	Venue	Result
T20I 1984	3 January	Hardik Pandya	Dasun Shanaka	Wankhede Stadium, Mumbai	India by 2 runs
T20I 1985	5 January	Hardik Pandya	Dasun Shanaka	Maharashtra Cricket Association Stadium, Pune	Sri Lanka by 16 runs
T20I 1986	7 January	Hardik Pandya	Dasun Shanaka	Saurashtra Cricket Association Stadium, Rajkot	India by 91 runs
ODI series
No.	Date	Home captain	Away captain	Venue	Result
ODI 4501	10 January	Rohit Sharma	Dasun Shanaka	Assam Cricket Association Stadium, Guwahati	India by 67 runs
ODI 4503	12 January	Rohit Sharma	Dasun Shanaka	Eden Gardens, Kolkata	India by 4 wickets
ODI 4505	15 January	Rohit Sharma	Dasun Shanaka	Greenfield International Stadium, Thiruvananthapuram	India by 317 runs

=== Ireland in Zimbabwe ===
T20I series
No.	Date	Home captain	Away captain	Venue	Result
T20I 1987	12 January	Craig Ervine	Andrew Balbirnie	Harare Sports Club, Harare	Zimbabwe by 5 wickets
T20I 1988	14 January	Craig Ervine	Andrew Balbirnie	Harare Sports Club, Harare	Ireland by 6 wickets
T20I 1989	15 January	Craig Ervine	Andrew Balbirnie	Harare Sports Club, Harare	Zimbabwe by 4 wickets
ODI series
No.	Date	Home captain	Away captain	Venue	Result
ODI 4506	18 January	Craig Ervine	Andrew Balbirnie	Harare Sports Club, Harare	Zimbabwe by 3 wickets (DLS)
ODI 4508	21 January	Sikandar Raza	Paul Stirling	Harare Sports Club, Harare	Ireland by 46 runs
ODI 4510	23 January	Craig Ervine	Paul Stirling	Harare Sports Club, Harare	No result

=== Pakistan women in Australia ===
2022–2025 ICC Women's Championship – WODI series
No.	Date	Home captain	Away captain	Venue	Result
WODI 1309	16 January	Meg Lanning	Bismah Maroof	Allan Border Field, Brisbane	Australia by 8 wickets (DLS)
WODI 1310	18 January	Meg Lanning	Bismah Maroof	Allan Border Field, Brisbane	Australia by 10 wickets
WODI 1311	21 January	Meg Lanning	Bismah Maroof	North Sydney Oval, Sydney	Australia by 101 runs
WT20I series
No.	Date	Home captain	Away captain	Venue	Result
WT20I 1345	24 January	Meg Lanning	Bismah Maroof	North Sydney Oval, Sydney	Australia by 8 wickets
WT20I 1347	26 January	Meg Lanning	Bismah Maroof	Bellerive Oval, Hobart	Australia by 8 wickets
WT20I 1348a	29 January	Meg Lanning	Bismah Maroof	Manuka Oval, Canberra	Match abandoned

=== New Zealand in India ===
ODI series
No.	Date	Home captain	Away captain	Venue	Result
ODI 4507	18 January	Rohit Sharma	Tom Latham	Rajiv Gandhi International Cricket Stadium, Hyderabad	India by 12 runs
ODI 4509	21 January	Rohit Sharma	Tom Latham	Shaheed Veer Narayan Singh International Cricket Stadium, Raipur	India by 8 wickets
ODI 4511	24 January	Rohit Sharma	Tom Latham	Holkar Stadium, Indore	India by 90 runs
T20I series
No.	Date	Home captain	Away captain	Venue	Result
T20I 1990	27 January	Hardik Pandya	Mitchell Santner	JSCA International Cricket Stadium, Ranchi	New Zealand by 21 runs
T20I 1991	29 January	Hardik Pandya	Mitchell Santner	Ekana Cricket Stadium, Lucknow	India by 6 wickets
T20I 1992	1 February	Hardik Pandya	Mitchell Santner	Narendra Modi Stadium, Ahmedabad	India by 168 runs

=== 2022–23 South Africa women's Tri-Nation Series ===
Pos	Team	Pld	W	L	NR	Pts	NRR
1	India	4	3	0	1	7	2.181
2	South Africa	4	2	1	1	5	1.006
3	West Indies	4	0	4	0	0	−2.435

Source: ESPNcricinfo

Round-robin
No.	Date	Team 1	Captain 1	Team 2	Captain 2	Venue	Result
WT20I 1342	19 January	South Africa	Suné Luus	India	Smriti Mandhana	Buffalo Park, East London	India by 27 runs
WT20I 1343	21 January	South Africa	Suné Luus	West Indies	Hayley Matthews	Buffalo Park, East London	South Africa by 45 runs
WT20I 1344	23 January	India	Harmanpreet Kaur	West Indies	Hayley Matthews	Buffalo Park, East London	India by 56 runs
WT20I 1346	25 January	South Africa	Suné Luus	West Indies	Hayley Matthews	Buffalo Park, East London	South Africa by 10 wickets
WT20I 1348	28 January	South Africa	Suné Luus	India	Harmanpreet Kaur	Buffalo Park, East London	No result
WT20I 1349	30 January	India	Harmanpreet Kaur	West Indies	Hayley Matthews	Buffalo Park, East London	India by 8 wickets
Final
No.	Date	Team 1	Captain 1	Team 2	Captain 2	Venue	Result
WT20I 1350	2 February	South Africa	Suné Luus	India	Harmanpreet Kaur	Buffalo Park, East London	South Africa by 5 wickets

=== England in South Africa ===
2020–2023 ICC Cricket World Cup Super League – ODI series
No.	Date	Home captain	Away captain	Venue	Result
ODI 4512	27 January	Temba Bavuma	Jos Buttler	Mangaung Oval, Bloemfontein	South Africa by 27 runs
ODI 4513	29 January	Temba Bavuma	Jos Buttler	Mangaung Oval, Bloemfontein	South Africa by 5 wickets
ODI 4514	1 February	Temba Bavuma	Jos Buttler	De Beers Diamond Oval, Kimberley	England by 59 runs

== February ==
=== West Indies in Zimbabwe ===
Test Series
No.	Date	Home Captain	Away Captain	Venue	Result
Test 2489	4–8 February	Craig Ervine	Kraigg Brathwaite	Queens Sports Club, Bulawayo	Match drawn
Test 2491	12–16 February	Craig Ervine	Kraigg Brathwaite	Queens Sports Club, Bulawayo	West Indies by an innings and 4 runs

=== 2023 ICC Women's T20 World Cup ===
Pos	Team	Pld	W	L	T	NR	Pts	NRR
1	Australia	4	4	0	0	0	8	2.149
2	South Africa (H)	4	2	2	0	0	4	0.738
3	New Zealand	4	2	2	0	0	4	0.138
4	Sri Lanka	4	2	2	0	0	4	−1.460
5	Bangladesh	4	0	4	0	0	0	−1.529

Source: ESPNcricinfo
(H) Host

Advance to the knockout stage

Pos	Team	Pld	W	L	T	NR	Pts	NRR
1	England	4	4	0	0	0	8	2.860
2	India	4	3	1	0	0	6	0.253
3	West Indies	4	2	2	0	0	4	−0.601
4	Pakistan	4	1	3	0	0	2	−0.703
5	Ireland	4	0	4	0	0	0	−1.814

Source: ESPNcricinfo

Advanced to the knockout stage

Group stage
No.	Date	Team 1	Captain 1	Team 2	Captain 2	Venue	Result
WT20I 1354	10 February	South Africa	Suné Luus	Sri Lanka	Chamari Athapaththu	Newlands Cricket Ground, Cape Town	Sri Lanka by 3 runs
WT20I 1356	11 February	England	Heather Knight	West Indies	Hayley Matthews	Boland Park, Paarl	England by 7 wickets
WT20I 1357	11 February	Australia	Meg Lanning	New Zealand	Sophie Devine	Boland Park, Paarl	Australia by 97 runs
WT20I 1359	12 February	India	Harmanpreet Kaur	Pakistan	Bismah Maroof	Newlands Cricket Ground, Cape Town	India by 7 wickets
WT20I 1360	12 February	Bangladesh	Nigar Sultana	Sri Lanka	Chamari Athapaththu	Newlands Cricket Ground, Cape Town	Sri Lanka by 7 wickets
WT20I 1361	13 February	England	Heather Knight	Ireland	Laura Delany	Boland Park, Paarl	England by 4 wickets
WT20I 1362	13 February	South Africa	Suné Luus	New Zealand	Sophie Devine	Boland Park, Paarl	South Africa by 65 runs
WT20I 1363	14 February	Australia	Meg Lanning	Bangladesh	Nigar Sultana	St George's Park, Gqeberha	Australia by 8 wickets
WT20I 1364	15 February	India	Harmanpreet Kaur	West Indies	Hayley Matthews	Newlands Cricket Ground, Cape Town	India by 6 wickets
WT20I 1365	15 February	Pakistan	Bismah Maroof	Ireland	Laura Delany	Newlands Cricket Ground, Cape Town	Pakistan by 70 runs
WT20I 1366	16 February	Australia	Meg Lanning	Sri Lanka	Chamari Athapaththu	St George's Park, Gqeberha	Australia by 10 wickets
WT20I 1367	17 February	Bangladesh	Nigar Sultana	New Zealand	Sophie Devine	Newlands Cricket Ground, Cape Town	New Zealand by 71 runs
WT20I 1368	17 February	Ireland	Laura Delany	West Indies	Hayley Matthews	Newlands Cricket Ground, Cape Town	West Indies by 6 wickets
WT20I 1369	18 February	England	Heather Knight	India	Harmanpreet Kaur	St George's Park, Gqeberha	England by 11 runs
WT20I 1370	18 February	South Africa	Suné Luus	Australia	Meg Lanning	St George's Park, Gqeberha	Australia by 6 wickets
WT20I 1371	19 February	Pakistan	Bismah Maroof	West Indies	Hayley Matthews	Boland Park, Paarl	West Indies by 3 runs
WT20I 1372	19 February	New Zealand	Sophie Devine	Sri Lanka	Chamari Athapaththu	Boland Park, Paarl	New Zealand by 102 runs
WT20I 1373	20 February	India	Harmanpreet Kaur	Ireland	Laura Delany	St George's Park, Gqeberha	India by 5 runs (DLS)
WT20I 1374	21 February	Pakistan	Nida Dar	England	Heather Knight	Newlands Cricket Ground, Cape Town	England by 114 runs
WT20I 1375	21 February	South Africa	Suné Luus	Bangladesh	Nigar Sultana	Newlands Cricket Ground, Cape Town	South Africa by 10 wickets

==== Finals ====
Semi-Finals
No.	Date	Team 1	Captain 1	Team 2	Captain 2	Venue	Result
WT20I 1376	23 February	Australia	Meg Lanning	India	Harmanpreet Kaur	Newlands Cricket Ground, Cape Town	Australia by 5 runs
WT20I 1377	24 February	South Africa	Suné Luus	England	Heather Knight	Newlands Cricket Ground, Cape Town	South Africa by 6 runs
Final
WT20I 1378	26 February	South Africa	Suné Luus	Australia	Meg Lanning	Newlands Cricket Ground, Cape Town	Australia by 19 runs

=== 2023 Nepal Tri-Nation Series (round 19) ===
2019–2023 ICC Cricket World Cup League 2 – Tri-series
No.	Date	Team 1	Captain 1	Team 2	Captain 2	Venue	Result
ODI 4515	14 February	Nepal	Rohit Paudel	Namibia	Gerhard Erasmus	Tribhuvan University International Cricket Ground, Kirtipur	Nepal by 2 wickets
ODI 4516	15 February	Namibia	Gerhard Erasmus	Scotland	Richie Berrington	Tribhuvan University International Cricket Ground, Kirtipur	Scotland by 10 wickets
ODI 4517	17 February	Scotland	Richie Berrington	Nepal	Rohit Paudel	Tribhuvan University International Cricket Ground, Kirtipur	Nepal by 3 wickets
ODI 4518	18 February	Namibia	Gerhard Erasmus	Nepal	Rohit Paudel	Tribhuvan University International Cricket Ground, Kirtipur	Nepal by 3 wickets
ODI 4519	20 February	Namibia	Gerhard Erasmus	Scotland	Richie Berrington	Tribhuvan University International Cricket Ground, Kirtipur	Scotland by 43 runs
ODI 4520	21 February	Scotland	Richie Berrington	Nepal	Rohit Paudel	Tribhuvan University International Cricket Ground, Kirtipur	Nepal by 2 wickets

=== England in New Zealand ===
Test series
No.	Date	Home captain	Away captain	Venue	Result
Test 2492	16–20 February	Tim Southee	Ben Stokes	Bay Oval, Mount Maunganui	England by 267 runs
Test 2494	24–28 February	Tim Southee	Ben Stokes	Basin Reserve, Wellington	New Zealand by 1 run

=== Afghanistan in UAE ===
T20I series
No.	Date	Home captain	Away captain	Venue	Result
T20I 1993	16 February	Chundangapoyil Rizwan	Rashid Khan	Sheikh Zayed Cricket Stadium, Abu Dhabi	Afghanistan by 5 wickets
T20I 1994	18 February	Chundangapoyil Rizwan	Rashid Khan	Sheikh Zayed Cricket Stadium, Abu Dhabi	United Arab Emirates by 9 wickets
T20I 1995	19 February	Chundangapoyil Rizwan	Rashid Khan	Sheikh Zayed Cricket Stadium, Abu Dhabi	Afghanistan by 6 wickets

=== Namibia in UAE ===
2019–2023 ICC Cricket World Cup League 2 – ODI series
No.	Date	Team 1	Captain 1	Team 2	Captain 2	Venue	Result
ODI 4521	23 February	United Arab Emirates	Chundangapoyil Rizwan	Namibia	Gerhard Erasmus	Dubai International Cricket Stadium, Dubai	United Arab Emirates by 1 wicket
ODI 4522	25 February	United Arab Emirates	Chundangapoyil Rizwan	Namibia	Gerhard Erasmus	Dubai International Cricket Stadium, Dubai	Namibia by 7 wickets

=== 2023 United Arab Emirates Tri-Nation Series ===
2019–2023 ICC Cricket World Cup League 2 – Tri-series
No.	Date	Team 1	Captain 1	Team 2	Captain 2	Venue	Result
ODI 4523	27 February	Nepal	Rohit Paudel	Papua New Guinea	Assad Vala	Dubai International Cricket Stadium, Dubai	Nepal by 4 wickets
ODI 4524	28 February	United Arab Emirates	Chundangapoyil Rizwan	Papua New Guinea	Assad Vala	Dubai International Cricket Stadium, Dubai	Papua New Guinea by 131 runs
ODI 4526	2 March	United Arab Emirates	Chundangapoyil Rizwan	Nepal	Rohit Paudel	Dubai International Cricket Stadium, Dubai	United Arab Emirates by 68 runs
ODI 4527	3 March	Nepal	Rohit Paudel	Papua New Guinea	Assad Vala	Dubai International Cricket Stadium, Dubai	Nepal by 3 wickets
ODI 4529	5 March	United Arab Emirates	Chundangapoyil Rizwan	Papua New Guinea	Assad Vala	Dubai International Cricket Stadium, Dubai	Papua New Guinea by 5 wickets
ODI 4530	6 March	United Arab Emirates	Muhammad Waseem	Nepal	Rohit Paudel	Dubai International Cricket Stadium, Dubai	Nepal by 42 runs

=== West Indies in South Africa ===
2021–2023 ICC World Test Championship — Test series
No.	Date	Home captain	Away captain	Venue	Result
Test 2495	28 February – 4 March	Temba Bavuma	Kraigg Brathwaite	Centurion Park, Centurion	South Africa by 87 runs
Test 2497	8–12 March	Temba Bavuma	Kraigg Brathwaite	Wanderers Stadium, Johannesburg	South Africa by 284 runs
ODI series
No.	Date	Home captain	Away captain	Venue	Result
ODI 4537a	16 March	Temba Bavuma	Shai Hope	Buffalo Park, East London	Match abandoned
ODI 4540	18 March	Temba Bavuma	Shai Hope	Buffalo Park, East London	West Indies by 48 runs
ODI 4544	21 March	Aiden Markram	Shai Hope	Senwes Park, Potchefstroom	South Africa by 4 wickets
T20I series
No.	Date	Home captain	Away captain	Venue	Result
T20I 2031	25 March	Aiden Markram	Rovman Powell	Centurion Park, Centurion	West Indies by 3 wickets
T20I 2032	26 March	Aiden Markram	Rovman Powell	Centurion Park, Centurion	South Africa by 6 wickets
T20I 2036	28 March	Aiden Markram	Rovman Powell	Wanderers Stadium, Johannesburg	West Indies by 7 runs

== March ==
=== England in Bangladesh ===
2020–2023 ICC Cricket World Cup Super League – ODI series
No.	Date	Home captain	Away captain	Venue	Result
ODI 4525	1 March	Tamim Iqbal	Jos Buttler	Sher-e-Bangla National Cricket Stadium, Mirpur	England by 3 wickets
ODI 4528	3 March	Tamim Iqbal	Jos Buttler	Sher-e-Bangla National Cricket Stadium, Mirpur	England by 132 runs
ODI 4531	6 March	Tamim Iqbal	Jos Buttler	Zohur Ahmed Chowdhury Stadium, Chattogram	Bangladesh by 50 runs
T20I series
No.	Date	Home captain	Away captain	Venue	Result
T20I 2018	9 March	Shakib Al Hasan	Jos Buttler	Zohur Ahmed Chowdhury Stadium, Chattogram	Bangladesh by 6 wickets
T20I 2023	12 March	Shakib Al Hasan	Jos Buttler	Sher-e-Bangla National Cricket Stadium, Mirpur	Bangladesh by 4 wickets
T20I 2026	14 March	Shakib Al Hasan	Jos Buttler	Sher-e-Bangla National Cricket Stadium, Mirpur	Bangladesh by 16 runs

=== Sri Lanka in New Zealand ===
2021–2023 ICC World Test Championship — Test series
No.	Date	Home captain	Away captain	Venue	Result
Test 2498	9–13 March	Tim Southee	Dimuth Karunaratne	Hagley Oval, Christchurch	New Zealand by 2 wickets
Test 2500	17–21 March	Tim Southee	Dimuth Karunaratne	Basin Reserve, Wellington	New Zealand by an innings and 58 runs
2020–2023 ICC Cricket World Cup Super League – ODI series
No.	Date	Home captain	Away captain	Venue	Result
ODI 4548	25 March	Tom Latham	Dasun Shanaka	Eden Park, Auckland	New Zealand by 198 runs
ODI 4552a	28 March	Tom Latham	Dasun Shanaka	Hagley Oval, Christchurch	Match abandoned
ODI 4557	31 March	Tom Latham	Dasun Shanaka	Seddon Park, Hamilton	New Zealand by 6 wickets
T20I series
No.	Date	Home captain	Away captain	Venue	Result
T20I 2039	2 April	Tom Latham	Dasun Shanaka	Eden Park, Auckland	Match tied (Sri Lanka won S/O)
T20I 2040	5 April	Tom Latham	Dasun Shanaka	University Oval, Dunedin	New Zealand by 9 wickets
T20I 2041	8 April	Tom Latham	Dasun Shanaka	John Davies Oval, Queenstown	New Zealand by 4 wickets

=== 2023 Nepal Tri-Nation Series (round 21) ===
2019–2023 ICC Cricket World Cup League 2 – Tri-series
No.	Date	Team 1	Captain 1	Team 2	Captain 2	Venue	Result
ODI 4532	9 March	Nepal	Rohit Paudel	Papua New Guinea	Assad Vala	Tribhuvan University International Cricket Ground, Kirtipur	Nepal by 52 runs
ODI 4533	10 March	Papua New Guinea	Assad Vala	United Arab Emirates	Muhammad Waseem	Tribhuvan University International Cricket Ground, Kirtipur	Papua New Guinea by 56 runs
ODI 4534	12 March	Nepal	Rohit Paudel	United Arab Emirates	Muhammad Waseem	Tribhuvan University International Cricket Ground, Kirtipur	Nepal by 177 runs
ODI 4535	13 March	Nepal	Rohit Paudel	Papua New Guinea	Assad Vala	Tribhuvan University International Cricket Ground, Kirtipur	Nepal by 9 wickets
ODI 4536	15 March	Papua New Guinea	Assad Vala	United Arab Emirates	Muhammad Waseem	Tribhuvan University International Cricket Ground, Kirtipur	United Arab Emirates by 6 wickets
ODI 4537	16 March	Nepal	Rohit Paudel	United Arab Emirates	Muhammad Waseem	Tribhuvan University International Cricket Ground, Kirtipur	Nepal by 9 runs (DLS)

=== Ireland in Bangladesh ===
ODI series
No.	Date	Home captain	Away captain	Venue	Result
ODI 4539	18 March	Tamim Iqbal	Andrew Balbirnie	Sylhet International Cricket Stadium, Sylhet	Bangladesh by 183 runs
ODI 4542	20 March	Tamim Iqbal	Andrew Balbirnie	Sylhet International Cricket Stadium, Sylhet	No result
ODI 4547	23 March	Tamim Iqbal	Andrew Balbirnie	Sylhet International Cricket Stadium, Sylhet	Bangladesh by 10 wickets
T20I series
No.	Date	Home captain	Away captain	Venue	Result
T20I 2034	27 March	Shakib Al Hasan	Paul Stirling	Zohur Ahmed Chowdhury Stadium, Chittagong	Bangladesh by 22 runs (DLS)
T20I 2037	29 March	Shakib Al Hasan	Paul Stirling	Zohur Ahmed Chowdhury Stadium, Chittagong	Bangladesh by 77 runs
T20I 2038	31 March	Shakib Al Hasan	Paul Stirling	Zohur Ahmed Chowdhury Stadium, Chittagong	Ireland by 7 wickets
Test series
No.	Date	Home captain	Away captain	Venue	Result
Test 2501	4–8 April	Shakib Al Hasan	Andrew Balbirnie	Sher-e-Bangla National Cricket Stadium, Mirpur	Bangladesh by 7 wickets

=== Netherlands in Zimbabwe ===
2020–2023 ICC Cricket World Cup Super League – ODI series
No.	Date	Home captain	Away captain	Venue	Result
ODI 4543	21 March	Craig Ervine	Scott Edwards	Harare Sports Club, Harare	Netherlands by 3 wickets
ODI 4546	23 March	Craig Ervine	Scott Edwards	Harare Sports Club, Harare	Zimbabwe by 1 run
ODI 4549	25 March	Craig Ervine	Scott Edwards	Harare Sports Club, Harare	Zimbabwe by 7 wickets

=== Afghanistan vs Pakistan in the United Arab Emirates ===
T20I series
No.	Date	Home captain	Away captain	Venue	Result
T20I 2030	24 March	Rashid Khan	Shadab Khan	Sharjah Cricket Stadium, Sharjah	Afghanistan by 6 wickets
T20I 2033	26 March	Rashid Khan	Shadab Khan	Sharjah Cricket Stadium, Sharjah	Afghanistan by 7 wickets
T20I 2035	27 March	Rashid Khan	Shadab Khan	Sharjah Cricket Stadium, Sharjah	Pakistan by 66 runs

=== 2023 Cricket World Cup Qualifier Play-off ===
Pos	Team	Pld	W	L	NR	Pts	NRR	Qualification
1	United States	5	4	1	0	8	0.810	Advanced to the 2023 Cricket World Cup Qualifier and 2024–2026 Cricket World Cup League 2
2	United Arab Emirates	5	4	1	0	8	0.458	Advanced to the 2023 Cricket World Cup Qualifier and 2024–2026 Cricket World Cup League 2
3	Namibia	5	3	2	0	6	0.601	Advanced to the 2024–2026 Cricket World Cup League 2
4	Canada	5	3	2	0	6	0.123	Advanced to the 2024–2026 Cricket World Cup League 2
5	Jersey	5	1	4	0	2	−0.840	Relegated to the 2024–2026 Cricket World Cup Challenge League
6	Papua New Guinea	5	0	5	0	0	−1.148	Relegated to the 2024–2026 Cricket World Cup Challenge League

Source: ESPNcricinfo

Round-robin
No.	Date	Team 1	Captain 1	Team 2	Captain 2	Venue	Result
ODI 4550	26 March	Namibia	Gerhard Erasmus	United States	Monank Patel	Wanderers Cricket Ground, Windhoek	United States by 80 runs
ODI 4551	27 March	Papua New Guinea	Assad Vala	United Arab Emirates	Muhammad Waseem	Wanderers Cricket Ground, Windhoek	United Arab Emirates by 21 runs
ODI 4552	27 March	Canada	Saad Bin Zafar	Jersey	Charles Perchard	United Ground, Windhoek	Canada by 31 runs
ODI 4553	29 March	Canada	Saad Bin Zafar	United States	Monank Patel	Wanderers Cricket Ground, Windhoek	Canada by 26 runs
ODI 4554	29 March	Namibia	Gerhard Erasmus	Papua New Guinea	Assad Vala	United Ground, Windhoek	Namibia by 48 runs
ODI 4555	30 March	Namibia	Gerhard Erasmus	Jersey	Charles Perchard	Wanderers Cricket Ground, Windhoek	Namibia by 8 wickets
ODI 4556	30 March	United Arab Emirates	Muhammad Waseem	United States	Monank Patel	United Ground, Windhoek	United States by 5 wickets
ODI 4559	1 April	Canada	Saad Bin Zafar	United Arab Emirates	Muhammad Waseem	Wanderers Cricket Ground, Windhoek	United Arab Emirates by 6 wickets
ODI 4560	1 April	Jersey	Charles Perchard	Papua New Guinea	Assad Vala	United Ground, Windhoek	Jersey by 11 runs
ODI 4561	2 April	Papua New Guinea	Assad Vala	United States	Monank Patel	Wanderers Cricket Ground, Windhoek	United States by 117 runs
ODI 4562	2 April	Namibia	Gerhard Erasmus	United Arab Emirates	Muhammad Waseem	United Ground, Windhoek	United Arab Emirates by 28 runs
ODI 4564	4 April	Namibia	Gerhard Erasmus	Canada	Saad Bin Zafar	Wanderers Cricket Ground, Windhoek	Namibia by 111 runs
ODI 4565	4 April	Jersey	Charles Perchard	United States	Monank Patel	United Ground, Windhoek	United States by 25 runs
ODI 4566	5 April	Jersey	Charles Perchard	United Arab Emirates	Muhammad Waseem	Wanderers Cricket Ground, Windhoek	United Arab Emirates by 68 runs
ODI 4567	5 April	Canada	Saad Bin Zafar	Papua New Guinea	Assad Vala	United Ground, Windhoek	Canada by 90 runs

=== Netherlands in South Africa ===
2020–2023 ICC Cricket World Cup Super League – ODI series
No.	Date	Home captain	Away captain	Venue	Result
ODI 4558	31 March	Temba Bavuma	Scott Edwards	Willowmoore Park, Benoni	South Africa by 8 wickets
ODI 4563	2 April	Temba Bavuma	Scott Edwards	Wanderers Stadium, Johannesburg	South Africa by 146 runs

== April ==
=== New Zealand in Pakistan (April 2023) ===
T20I series
No.	Date	Home captain	Away captain	Venue	Result
T20I 2045	14 April	Babar Azam	Tom Latham	Gaddafi Stadium, Lahore	Pakistan by 88 runs
T20I 2046	15 April	Babar Azam	Tom Latham	Gaddafi Stadium, Lahore	Pakistan by 38 runs
T20I 2047	17 April	Babar Azam	Tom Latham	Gaddafi Stadium, Lahore	New Zealand by 4 runs
T20I 2048	20 April	Babar Azam	Tom Latham	Rawalpindi Cricket Stadium, Rawalpindi	No result
T20I 2049	24 April	Babar Azam	Tom Latham	Rawalpindi Cricket Stadium, Rawalpindi	New Zealand by 6 wickets
ODI series
No.	Date	Home captain	Away captain	Venue	Result
ODI 4569	27 April	Babar Azam	Tom Latham	Rawalpindi Cricket Stadium, Rawalpindi	Pakistan by 5 wickets
ODI 4571	29 April	Babar Azam	Tom Latham	Rawalpindi Cricket Stadium, Rawalpindi	Pakistan by 7 wickets
ODI 4573	3 May	Babar Azam	Tom Latham	National Stadium, Karachi	Pakistan by 26 runs
ODI 4574	5 May	Babar Azam	Tom Latham	National Stadium, Karachi	Pakistan by 102 runs
ODI 4575	7 May	Babar Azam	Tom Latham	National Stadium, Karachi	New Zealand by 47 runs

=== Ireland in Sri Lanka ===
Test series
No.	Date	Home captain	Away captain	Venue	Result
Test 2502	16–20 April	Dimuth Karunaratne	Andrew Balbirnie	Galle International Stadium, Galle	Sri Lanka by an innings and 280 runs
Test 2503	24–28 April	Dimuth Karunaratne	Andrew Balbirnie	Galle International Stadium, Galle	Sri Lanka by an innings and 10 runs

=== Zimbabwe women in Thailand ===
WODI series
No.	Date	Home captain	Away captain	Venue	Result
WODI 1312	19 April	Naruemol Chaiwai	Mary-Anne Musonda	Terdthai Cricket Ground, Bangkok	Thailand by 78 runs
WODI 1313	21 April	Naruemol Chaiwai	Mary-Anne Musonda	Terdthai Cricket Ground, Bangkok	Thailand by 45 runs
WODI 1314	23 April	Naruemol Chaiwai	Mary-Anne Musonda	Terdthai Cricket Ground, Bangkok	Thailand by 6 wickets
WT20I series
No.	Date	Home captain	Away captain	Venue	Result
WT20I 1410	25 April	Naruemol Chaiwai	Mary-Anne Musonda	Terdthai Cricket Ground, Bangkok	Zimbabwe by 24 runs
WT20I 1414	27 April	Naruemol Chaiwai	Mary-Anne Musonda	Terdthai Cricket Ground, Bangkok	Thailand by 5 wickets
WT20I 1417	28 April	Naruemol Chaiwai	Mary-Anne Musonda	Terdthai Cricket Ground, Bangkok	Thailand by 8 wickets

== See also ==
- Associate international cricket in 2022–23
