= Royal Chiangmai Golf Club =

Sports venue

Coordinates: 19°01′19.3506″N 98°59′14.1612″E

The Royal Chiangmai Golf Club is a golf resort in Chiang Mai, Thailand. Among other sports facilities it includes a Cricket Oval.

== Cricket ==
Royal Chiangmai Golf Club
Ground information
- Location: Chiang Mai, Thailand

International information
- First WODI: 20 November 2022: Thailand v Netherlands
- Last WODI: 26 November 2022: Thailand v Netherlands
- First WT20I: 29 November 2022: Thailand v Netherlands
- Last WT20I: 3 December 2022: Thailand v Netherlands
- As of 3 December 2022; Source: Cricinfo

The first ICC International match was held on 20 November, 2022 when the Netherlands Women's Cricket team held a bilateral series with the Thailand Women's Cricket team. The ground was approved for both a One Day International game and Twenty20 International game.

=== International Record ===
==== Women's One-Day International centuries ====
The following table summarizes the WODI centuries scored at this venue.

| No. | Score | Player | Team | Balls | Innings | Opposing team | Date | Result |
|---|---|---|---|---|---|---|---|---|
| 1 | 102 | Natthakan Chantam | Thailand | 135 | 1 | Netherlands | 20 November 2022 | Won |

==== Women's One-Day International five-wicket hauls ====
The following table summarizes the five-wicket hauls taken in WODIs at this venue.

| # | Figures | Player | Country | Innings | Opponent | Date | Result |
|---|---|---|---|---|---|---|---|
| 1 | 5/25 | Iris Zwilling | Netherlands | 1 | Thailand | 24 November 2022 | Lost |
