= Cricket Association of Thailand =

- Sport: Cricket
- Jurisdiction: Thailand
- Abbreviation: CAT
- Founded: 2005
- Affiliation: International Cricket Council
- Affiliation date: 2005
- Regional affiliation: Asian Cricket Council
- Headquarters: 286 Sports Authority of Thailand 16th Floor Ramkhamhaeng road
- Location: Hua Mak, Bangkapi, Bangkok
- President: Komol Chantrarak
- CEO: Mohideen A. Kader
- Secretary: Acharin Suthisawad
- Women's coach: Mr. Peter John Jansen
- Replaced: Thailand Cricket League
- (founded): 1971

Official website
- www.cricketthailand.org
- Other key staff: Shan kader, Khuram Gilani, Saurabh Dhanuka, K.Poom, K.Bird.
- (Thailand)

Cricket Association of Thailand (CAT) (Thai: สมาคมกีฬาคริกเก็ตแห่งประเทศไทย) is the national governing body of cricket in Thailand. It is the successor of the Thailand Cricket League, which was formed in 1971 and elected to International Cricket Council (ICC) in 1995. Since 2005, it is one of the associate member of the ICC. The main aims of the organization is to promote and popularize cricket throughout all the provinces of Thailand and to propagate the “Spirit of Cricket”.

Cricket Association of Thailand operates all of Thailand's national representative cricket sides, including the Thailand national cricket team, the Thailand national women's cricket team as well as the youth sides. CAT is also responsible for organising and hosting the cricket matches of different formats with other nations, and scheduling the home international fixtures.

== History ==
Cricket was introduced to Thailand by the children of elite Thai families who learnt the game during education in England. They founded the Bangkok City Cricket Club in 1890, and the side played its first game in November of that year at Pramane ground (Later named Sanam Luang). But cricket has never been a popular sport in Thailand, where other sports like football, Muay Thai, tennis and golf have high visibility. In 1971, after the establishment of Thailand Cricket League, cricket has been organized as competitive sport. The Sports Authority of Thailand renamed the TCL to the Cricket Association of Thailand in 2004. Since then, many constructive efforts have been made to popularize cricket among the Thai people. The past ten years has seen a heartening growth of the game at grass root level.

== Bangkok Cricket League ==
The Bangkok Cricket League is a professional league in Bangkok, which has run under the guidance of the Cricket Association of Thailand since 2002. It is the most premier and largest league of Cricket in Thailand which is also officially recognized by the Sports Authority of Thailand. It is run voluntarily and independently by a dedicated group of people in Bangkok and is completely self funded.

== See also ==
- Thailand national cricket team
- Thailand national women's cricket team
