= List of Thailand women ODI cricketers =

This is a list of Thailand women's One-day international cricketers. A One Day International (ODI), is an international cricket match between two representative teams, each having ODI status. An ODI differs from Test matches in that the number of overs per team is limited, and that each team has only one innings. Thailand women were granted ODI status by the International Cricket Council in May 2022. They played their first official ODI matches during a home series against the Netherlands in November 2022.

The list is arranged in the order in which each player won her first ODI cap. Where more than one player won her first ODI cap in the same match, those players are listed alphabetically by surname.

== Key ==
General

- † – Wicket-keeper
- First – Year of debut
- Last – Year of latest game
- Mat – Number of matches played

Batting

- Runs – Runs scored in career
- HS – Highest score
- Avg – Average runs scored per dismissal
- 50s – Number of half centuries
- 100 – Centuries scored
- * – Batter remained not out

Bowling

- Balls – Balls bowled in career
- Wkt – Wickets taken in career
- BBI – Best bowling in an innings
- Ave – Average runs conceded per wicket

Fielding

- Ca – Catches taken
- St – Stumpings taken

== Players ==
Statistics are correct as of 17 August 2026.

Thailand Women ODI cricketers
Cap	Name	First	Last	Mat	Batting					Bowling					Fielding		Ref
Cap	Name	First	Last	Mat	Runs	HS	Avg	50	100	Balls	Wkt	BBI	Ave	5WI	Ca	St	Ref
1	Nattaya Boochatham	2022	2025	13	165	29	13.75	0	0	575	12	3/7	30.66	0	4	0	
2	Naruemol Chaiwai‡	2022	2026	17	475	82	33.92	5	0	12	0	—	—	0	5	0	
3	Natthakan Chantham	2022	2026	17	716	102	42.11	7	1	—	—	—	—	–	7	0	
4	Onnicha Kamchomphu	2022	2026	15	51	14*	5.66	0	0	680	26	3/2	15.03	0	4	0	
5	Rosenanee Kanoh	2022	2023	9	100	38	14.28	0	0	—	—	—	—	0	3	0	
6	Nannapat Koncharoenkai†	2022	2026	14	303	54	23.30	0	0	—	—	—	—	–	8	3	
7	Suleeporn Laomi	2022	2026	15	78	22	7.80	0	0	564	20	4/26	19.60	0	5	0	
8	Phannita Maya	2022	2026	17	161	43	11.50	0	0	473	16	2/8	22.31	0	5	0	
9	Thipatcha Putthawong	2022	2026	17	77	22	8.55	0	0	842	30	6/6	16.93	1	3	0	
10	Chanida Sutthiruang	2022	2026	17	209	28	14.92	0	0	419	10	2/14	32.00	0	3	0	
11	Sornnarin Tippoch	2022	2023	9	89	41	9.88	0	0	208	5	3/15	20.00	0	4	0	
12	Banthida Leephatthana†	2022	2023	4	30	26	10.00	0	0	—	—	—	—	–	1	0	
13	Nanthita Boonsukham	2022	2022	2	0	0	0.00	0	0	71	4	4/26	10.75	0	0	0	
14	Suwanan Khiaoto	2023	2025	5	106	59	21.20	1	0	—	—	—	—	–	1	0	
15	Sunida Chaturongrattana	2025	2026	8	34	21	6.80	0	0	282	6	3/20	30.83	0	2	0	
16	Aphisara Suwanchonrathi	2025	2026	4	31	28	7.75	0	0	24	0	—	—	–	2	0	
17	Nannaphat Chaihan	2026	2026	3	7	4*	3.50	0	0	—	—	—	—	–	0	0	

== See also ==
- List of Thailand women Twenty20 International cricketers
