= Heather Siegers =

Dutch cricketer (born 1996)

Personal information
- Full name: Heather Diantha Jan Siegers
- Born: 10 October 1996 (age 30); Haarlem, Netherlands
- Batting: Right-handed
- Bowling: Right-arm medium
- Role: Wicket-keeper
- Relatives: Silver Siegers (sister)

International information
- National side: Netherlands (2018–2025)
- ODI debut (cap 98): 20 November 2022 v Thailand
- Last ODI: 7 July 2023 v Thailand
- T20I debut (cap 30): 7 July 2018 v UAE
- Last T20I: 24 August 2025 v Italy

Domestic team information
- Years: Team
- 2017: Worcestershire

Career statistics
Competition	WODI	WT20I
Matches	5	62
Runs scored	105	1,081
Batting average	21.00	20.39
100s/50s	0/0	1/2
Top score	35	106*
Balls bowled	–	536
Wickets	–	28
Bowling average	–	18.28
5 wickets in innings	–	0
10 wickets in match	–	0
Best bowling	–	3/27
Catches/stumpings	3/–	21/1
- Source: ESPNcricinfo, 14 October 2025

Heather Diantha Jan Siegers (born 10 October 1996) is a Dutch cricketer, and the former captain of the Netherlands women's national cricket team.

== Career ==
She played for the Netherlands women's national cricket team in the 2015 ICC Women's World Twenty20 Qualifier in November 2015.

In June 2018, she was named the captain of the Netherlands for the 2018 ICC Women's World Twenty20 Qualifier tournament. Ahead of the tournament, the International Cricket Council (ICC) named her as the player to watch in the Dutch squad. She made her Women's Twenty20 International (WT20I) debut for the Netherlands against the United Arab Emirates in the World Twenty20 Qualifier on 7 July 2018. In July 2018, she was named in the ICC Women's Global Development Squad.

In May 2019, she was named in Netherlands' squad for the 2019 ICC Women's Qualifier Europe tournament in Spain. She was the leading wicket-taker in the tournament, with seven dismissals in four matches. In August 2019, she was named in the Dutch squad for the 2019 ICC Women's World Twenty20 Qualifier tournament in Scotland. She was the leading wicket-taker for the Netherlands in the tournament, with eight dismissals in five matches.

In October 2021, she was named as the captain of the Dutch team for the 2021 Women's Cricket World Cup Qualifier tournament in Zimbabwe.

On 13 October 2025, Siegers announced her retirement from international cricket. She later returned to the Netherlands women's team for the 2026 Women's T20 World Cup.
