= Mae Faek =

Mae Faek แม่แฝก
- Tambon
- Interactive map of Mae Faek
- Coordinates: 19°00′51″N 98°58′13″E
- Country: Thailand
- Province: Chiang Mai
- Amphoe: San Sai

Population (2020)
  - Total: 9,061
- Time zone: UTC+7 (TST)
- Postal code: 50290
- TIS 1099: 501409

Mae Faek (Thai: แม่แฝก) is a tambon (subdistrict) of San Sai District, in Chiang Mai Province, Thailand. In 2020 it had a total population of 9,061 people.

== Administration ==
=== Central administration ===
The tambon is subdivided into 12 administrative villages (muban).

No.	Name	Thai
1.	Ban Nong Ma Chap	บ้านหนองมะจับ
2.	Ban Pong	บ้านโป่ง
3.	Ban Huai Kaeo	บ้านห้วยแก้ว
4.	Ban Rom Luang	บ้านร่มหลวง
5.	Ban Si Ngam	บ้านศรีงาม
6.	Ban Mae Tae	บ้านแม่แต
7.	Ban Sahakon Nikhom	บ้านสหกรณ์นิคม
8.	Ban Nong Sae	บ้านหนองแสะ
9.	Ban Phra That	บ้านพระธาตุ
10.	Ban Si Ngam Phatthana	บ้านศรีงามพัฒนา
11.	Ban Rom Pho Thong	บ้านร่มโพธิ์ทอง
12.	Ban Nong Wai	บ้านหนองไหว

=== Local administration ===
The whole area of the subdistrict is covered by the subdistrict municipality (Thesaban Tambon) Mae Faek (เทศบาลตำบลแม่แฝก).
