= Rosenanee Kanoh =

Thai cricketer (born 1999)

Personal information
- Born: 13 May 1999 (age 27); Pattani, Thailand
- Batting: Right-handed
- Bowling: Right-arm offbreak
- Role: All-rounder

International information
- National side: Thailand (2019–2025)
- ODI debut (cap 5): 20 November 2022 v Netherlands
- Last ODI: 7 July 2023 v Netherlands
- T20I debut (cap 16): 21 August 2019 v Bangladesh
- Last T20I: 19 December 2025 v Malaysia
Medal record
Representing Thailand
Women's Cricket
Southeast Asian Games
Gold medal – first place	2017 Kuala Lumpur	Twenty20
Gold medal – first place	2023 Cambodia	Twenty10
Gold medal – first place	2023 Cambodia	Twenty20
Gold medal – first place	2023 Cambodia	50 overs
- Source: Cricinfo, 8 October 2024

Rosenanee Kanoh (also Rosenan Kanoh) (Thai:โรสนานี กาโน๊ะ, born 13 May 1999) is a retired Thai international cricketer.

== Career ==
In July 2018, Kanoh was named in Thailand's squad for the 2018 ICC Women's World Twenty20 Qualifier tournament. In August 2019, she was named in Thailand's squad for the 2019 ICC Women's World Twenty20 Qualifier tournament in Scotland. She made her Women's Twenty20 International (WT20I) debut against Bangladesh, in the Netherlands on 21 August 2019.

In January 2020, she was named in Thailand's squad for the 2020 ICC Women's T20 World Cup in Australia. In November 2021, she was named in Thailand's team for the 2021 Women's Cricket World Cup Qualifier tournament in Zimbabwe. She played in Thailand's first match of the tournament, on 21 November 2021 against Zimbabwe.

In October 2022, she played for Thailand in Women's Twenty20 Asia Cup.

Kanoh was part of the Thailand squad for the 2025 Women's Cricket World Cup Qualifier in Pakistan in April 2025.

Kanoh is a student at the Thammasat University.

In December 2025, she announced her retirement from international cricket after helping Thailand to a sixth gold medal in the women's T20 final at the SEA Games 2025.
