= Chanida Sutthiruang =

Thai cricketer (born 1993)

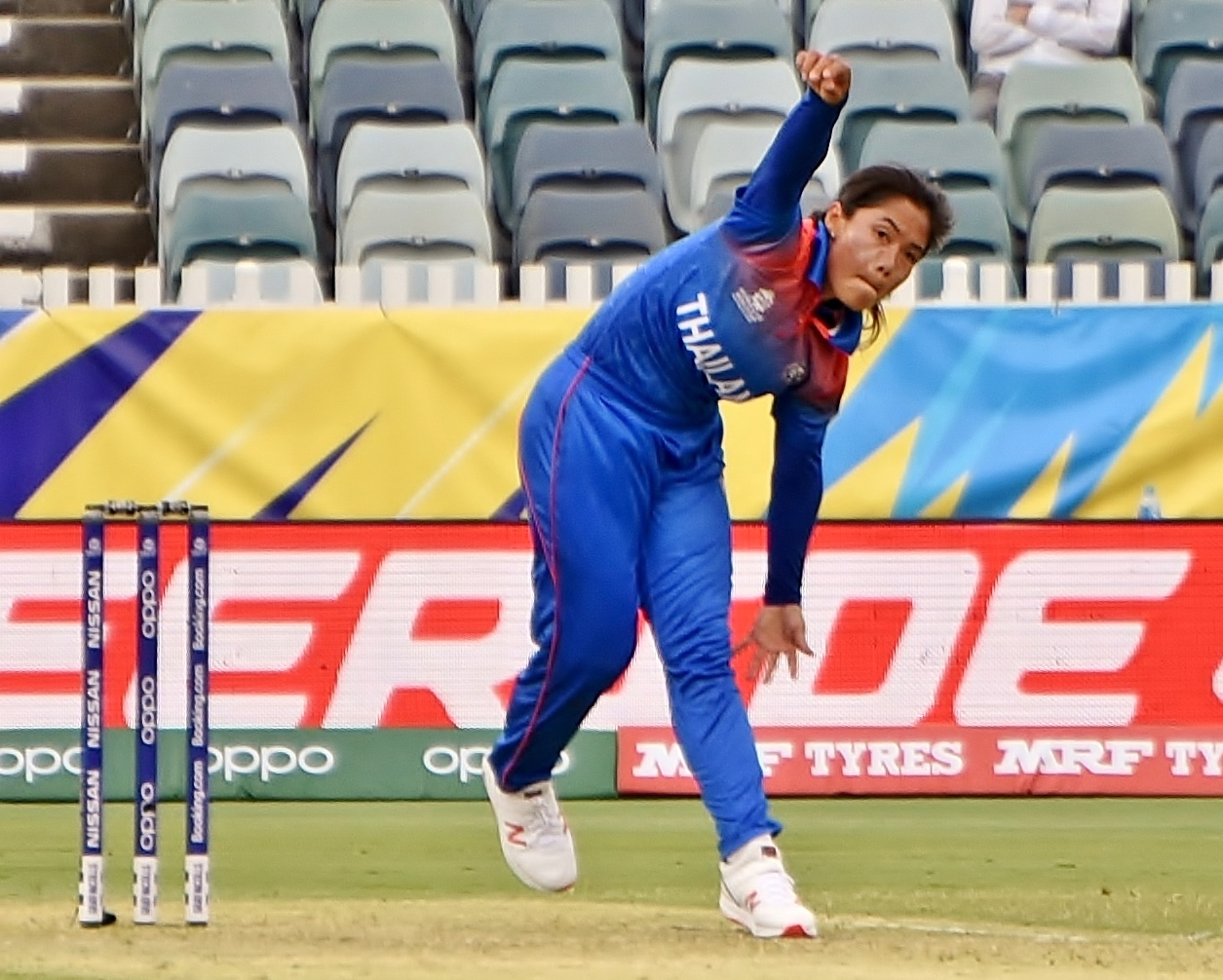
- Sutthiruang bowling for Thailand during the 2020 ICC Women's T20 World Cup

Personal information
- Born: 16 July 1993 (age 33); Uttaradit, Thailand
- Batting: Right-handed
- Bowling: Right-arm medium
- Role: All-rounder

International information
- National side: Thailand
- ODI debut (cap 10): 20 November 2022 v Netherlands
- Last ODI: 7 July 2023 v Netherlands
- T20I debut (cap 10): 3 June 2018 v Pakistan
- Last T20I: 24 July 2022 v Sri Lanka

Career statistics
Competition	WODI	WT20I
Matches	9	91
Runs scored	73	790
Batting average	10.42	14.10
100s/50s	0/0	0/0
Top score	25	46*
Balls bowled	142	1,025
Wickets	7	75
Bowling average	20.28	13.66
5 wickets in innings	0	1
10 wickets in match	0	9
Best bowling	2/14	5/4
Catches/stumpings	0/–	17/–
Medal record
Representing Thailand
Women's Cricket
Southeast Asian Games
Gold medal – first place	2017 Kuala Lumpur	Twenty20
Gold medal – first place	2023 Cambodia	Twenty10
Gold medal – first place	2023 Cambodia	Twenty20
Gold medal – first place	2023 Cambodia	50 overs
- Source: Cricinfo, 8 October 2024

Chanida Sutthiruang (Thai:ชนิดา สุทธิเรือง, born 16 July 1993) is a Thai cricketer. She played for the Thailand women's national cricket team in the 2017 Women's Cricket World Cup Qualifier in February 2017. She was the first cricketer for Thailand to take a hat-trick in a Women's Twenty20 International match.

== Career ==
In June 2018, she was named in Thailand's squad for the 2018 ICC Women's World Twenty20 Qualifier tournament. She made her Women's Twenty20 International (WT20I) debut for Thailand on 3 June 2018, in the 2018 Women's Twenty20 Asia Cup. She was the joint-leading wicket-taker for Thailand in the tournament, with six dismissals in five matches.

In August 2019, she was named in Thailand's squad for the 2019 ICC Women's World Twenty20 Qualifier tournament in Scotland. She was the leading wicket-taker in the tournament, with twelve dismissals in five matches, and she was named the player of the tournament.

In December 2019, the International Cricket Council (ICC) named her as the ICC Women's Emerging Player of the Year at their annual award ceremony. In January 2020, she was named in Thailand's squad for the 2020 ICC Women's T20 World Cup in Australia.

In November 2020, Sutthiruang was nominated for the ICC Women's Associate Cricketer of the Decade award. In November 2021, she was named in Thailand's team for the 2021 Women's Cricket World Cup Qualifier tournament in Zimbabwe. She played in Thailand's first match of the tournament, on 21 November 2021 against Zimbabwe.

In October 2022, she played for Thailand in Women's Twenty20 Asia Cup.

Sutthiruang was part of the Thailand squad for the 2025 Women's Cricket World Cup Qualifier in Pakistan in April 2025.
