= Phannita Maya =

Thai cricketer (born 2004)

Personal information
- Born: 15 June 2004 (age 22); Chiang Mai, Thailand
- Batting: Right-handed
- Bowling: Right-arm medium
- Role: All-rounder

International information
- National side: Thailand
- ODI debut (cap 8): 20 November 2022 v Netherlands
- Last ODI: 7 July 2023 v Netherlands
- T20I debut (cap 17): 18 September 2022 v United Arab Emirates
- Last T20I: 26 November 2025 v Uganda
Medal record
Representing Thailand
Women's Cricket
Southeast Asian Games
Gold medal – first place	2023 Cambodia	Twenty10
Gold medal – first place	2023 Cambodia	Twenty20
Gold medal – first place	2023 Cambodia	50 overs
- Source: Cricinfo, 26 November 2025

Phannita Maya (Thai:พัณณิตา มายะ, born 15 June 2004) is a Thai cricketer. In January 2020, at the age of 15, she was selected in Thailand's squad for the 2020 ICC Women's T20 World Cup. Prior to being selected in Thailand's squad for the Women's T20 World Cup, she was in the squad for the qualification tournament in Scotland, playing in a single warm-up match. In November 2021, she was named in Thailand's team for the 2021 Women's Cricket World Cup Qualifier tournament in Zimbabwe.

In October 2022, she played for Thailand in Women's Twenty20 Asia Cup.

Maya was part of the Thailand squad for the 2025 Women's Cricket World Cup Qualifier in Pakistan in April 2025.
