= Onnicha Kamchomphu =

Thai cricketer (born 1997)

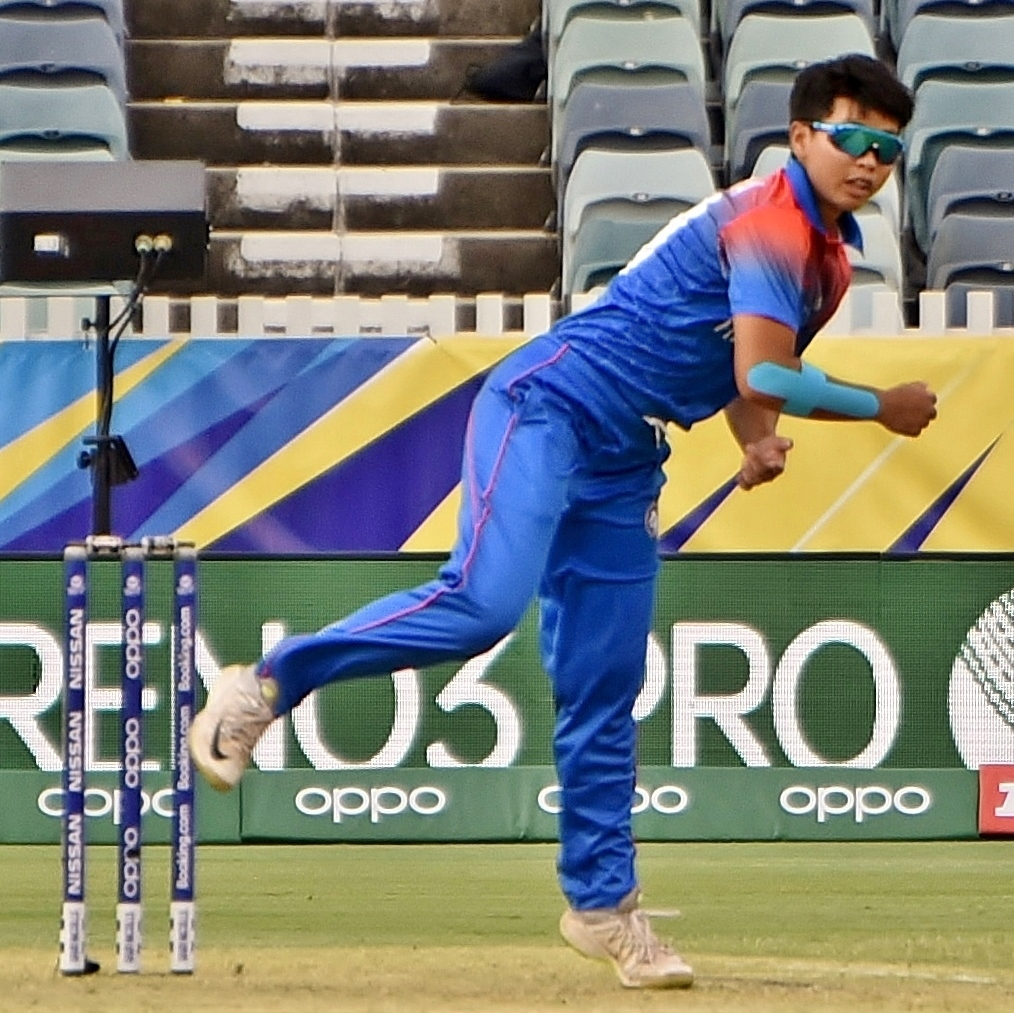
- Kamchomphu bowling for Thailand during the 2020 ICC Women's T20 World Cup

Personal information
- Born: 25 December 1997 (age 28); Khon Kaen, Thailand
- Batting: Right-handed
- Bowling: Right-arm offbreak
- Role: All-rounder

International information
- National side: Thailand
- ODI debut (cap 4): 20 November 2022 v Netherlands
- Last ODI: 7 July 2023 v Netherlands
- T20I debut (cap 12): 4 June 2018 v India
- Last T20I: 26 May 2026 v Hong Kong
Medal record
Representing Thailand
Women's Cricket
Southeast Asian Games
Gold medal – first place	2017 Kuala Lumpur	Twenty20
Gold medal – first place	2023 Cambodia	Twenty10
Gold medal – first place	2023 Cambodia	Twenty20
Gold medal – first place	2023 Cambodia	50 overs
- Source: Cricinfo, 8 October 2024

Onnicha Kamchomphu (Thai:อรณิชา คำชมภู, born 25 December 1997) is a Thai cricketer.

== Career ==
Kamchomphu made her Women's Twenty20 International (WT20I) debut for Thailand against India on 4 June 2018, in the 2018 Women's Twenty20 Asia Cup.

On 13 August 2019, in the 2019 Netherlands Women's Quadrangular Series match against Ireland, Kamchomphu became the first bowler for Thailand to take a hat-trick in a WT20I match, finishing with three wickets for twelve runs from the two overs she bowled. She finished the tournament as the joint-leading wicket-taker, with nine dismissals from six matches. Later the same month, she was named in Thailand's squad for the 2019 ICC Women's World Twenty20 Qualifier tournament in Scotland. In January 2020, she was named in Thailand's squad for the 2020 ICC Women's T20 World Cup in Australia.

In November 2021, she was named in Thailand's team for the 2021 Women's Cricket World Cup Qualifier tournament in Zimbabwe. She played in Thailand's first match of the tournament, on 21 November 2021 against Zimbabwe.

In October 2022, she played for Thailand in Women's Twenty20 Asia Cup.

Kamchomphu was part of the Thailand squad for the 2025 Women's Cricket World Cup Qualifier in Pakistan in April 2025.
