= Natthakan Chantham =

Thai cricketer (born 1996)

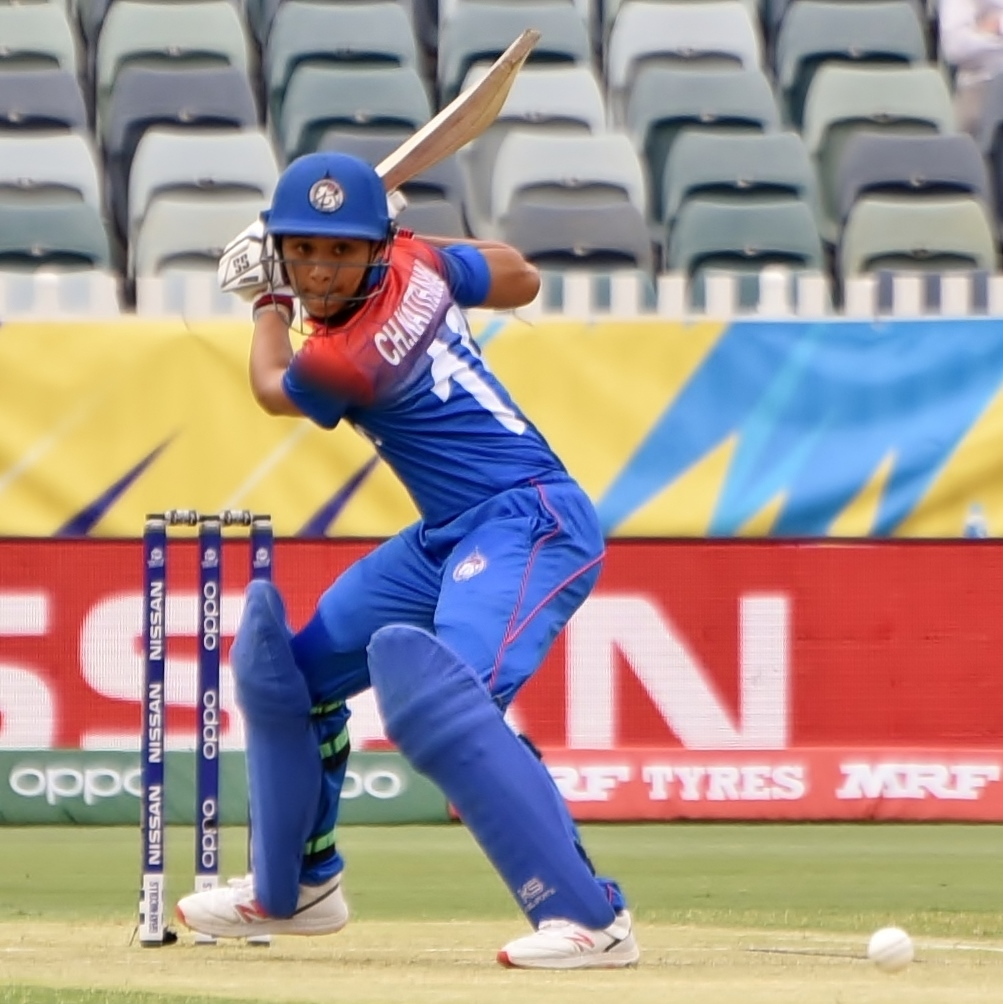
- Chantham batting for Thailand during the 2020 ICC Women's T20 World Cup

Personal information
- Born: 1 January 1996 (age 30); Chiang Mai, Thailand
- Nickname: Jeans
- Batting: Right-handed
- Bowling: Right-arm medium-fast
- Role: Batter

International information
- National side: Thailand
- ODI debut (cap 3): 20 November 2022 v Netherlands
- Last ODI: 19 April 2025 v West Indies
- T20I debut (cap 3): 3 June 2018 v Pakistan
- Last T20I: 26 May 2026 v Hong Kong

Domestic team information
- Years: Team
- 2020: Trailblazers
- 2022: Velocity

Career statistics
Competition	WODI	WT20I
Matches	9	82
Runs scored	473	1,690
Batting average	52.55	27.25
100s/50s	1/5	0/9
Top score	102	88*
Catches/stumpings	5/–	23/–
Medal record
Representing Thailand
Women's Cricket
Southeast Asian Games
Gold medal – first place	2017 Kuala Lumpur	Twenty20
Gold medal – first place	2023 Cambodia	Twenty10
Gold medal – first place	2023 Cambodia	Twenty20
Gold medal – first place	2023 Cambodia	50 overs
- Source: ESPNcricinfo, 26 November 2025

Natthakan Chantham (Thai: ณัฏฐกานต์ จันทร์ธรรม Thai pronunciation: [nát.tʰa.kāːn tɕān.tʰām]; na-ta-KAHN chan-TAHM, born 1 January 1996) is a Thai cricketer, who plays for the women's national cricket team as a right-handed opening batter.

== International career ==
She played for the Thailand women's national cricket team in the 2017 Women's Cricket World Cup Qualifier in February 2017.

In June 2018, she was named in Thailand's squad for the 2018 ICC Women's World Twenty20 Qualifier tournament. She made her Women's Twenty20 International (WT20I) debut for Thailand on 3 June 2018, in the 2018 Women's Twenty20 Asia Cup. In November 2018, she was named in the Women's Global Development Squad, to play fixtures against Women's Big Bash League (WBBL) clubs.

In August 2019, she was named in Thailand's squad for the 2019 ICC Women's World Twenty20 Qualifier tournament in Scotland. In January 2020, she was named in Thailand's squad for the 2020 ICC Women's T20 World Cup in Australia. She was the leading run-scorer for Thailand in the tournament, with 103 runs in four matches. In Thailand's last match of the tournament, against Pakistan, she scored 56 to register her country’s first Women’s T20 World Cup half-century, and shared in an opening partnership of 93 with Nattaya Boochatham.

In November 2020, Chantham was nominated for the ICC Women's Associate Cricketer of the Decade award.

Chantham scored consecutive centuries (113 and 120) against the South Africa Emerging side in September 2021, during her team's tour of Zimbabwe and South Africa. In November 2021, she was named in Thailand's team for the 2021 Women's Cricket World Cup Qualifier tournament in Zimbabwe. She played in Thailand's first match of the tournament, on 21 November 2021 against Zimbabwe.

In October 2022, she played for Thailand in Women's Twenty20 Asia Cup.

On 20 November 2022, she scored her maiden Women's One Day International century, making 102 against the Netherlands.

Chantham was part of the Thailand squad for the 2025 Women's Cricket World Cup Qualifier in Pakistan in April 2025.

== Franchise career ==
In October 2020, she was selected to play for the IPL Trailblazers in the 2020 Women's T20 Challenge league, becoming the first Thai cricketer to play in a professional Twenty20 franchise league. In the tournament final, she played a prominent role in the Trailblazers' victory, by diving spectacularly to save a boundary by Jemimah Rodrigues, and then by taking a breakthrough catch in the covers to dismiss Rodrigues off the bowling of Deepti Sharma.
