= Thailand women's national cricket team =

Cricket team

Thailand
- Association: Cricket Association of Thailand

Personnel
- Captain: Naruemol Chaiwai (Note: Thipatcha Putthawong replaced Chaiwai as captain of the T20 team prior to the 2024 ACC Women's Premier Cup in July, and has captained 4 WT20I matches including one in the team's most recent WT20I series in December 2024. However, Chaiwai captained the side in the remaining 3 matches of the series and their most recent game.)
- Coach: Nitish Salekar

International Cricket Council
- ICC status: Associate member (2005); Affiliate member (1995)
- ICC region: Asia
| ICC Rankings | Current | Best-ever |
| ODI | 11th | 7th (4 May 2023) |
| T20I | 11th | 10th (4 Jan 2022) |

One Day Internationals
- First ODI: v. Netherlands at Royal Chiangmai Golf Club, Chiang Mai; 20 November 2022
- Last ODI: v. Papua New Guinea at Amini Park, Port Moresby; 17 August 2026
| ODIs | Played | Won/Lost |
| Total | 17 | 11/6 (0 ties, 0 no results) |
| This year | 3 | 3/0 (0 ties, 0 no results) |
- Women's World Cup Qualifier appearances: 2 (first in 2017)
- Best result: 9th (2017) (Note: The team were placed first in the 2021 qualifying tournament when it was suspended on 27 November 2021, prior to its planned conclusion.)

T20 Internationals
- First T20I: v. Pakistan at Kinrara Academy Oval, Bandar Kinrara; 3 June 2018
- Last T20I: v. Bangladesh at Seven Districts Ground, Ajman; 18 November 2026
| T20Is | Played | Won/Lost |
| Total | 152 | 99/51 (0 ties, 2 no results) |
| This year | 29 | 16/13 (0 ties, 0 no results) |
- T20 World Cup appearances: 1 (first in 2020)
- Best result: Group stage (2020)
- T20 World Cup Qualifier appearances: 5 (first in 2013)
- Best result: 2nd (2019)
T20I kit
- As of 18 November 2026

The Thailand women's national cricket team represents Thailand in international women's cricket matches. Thailand is one of the strongest associate teams in women's international cricket and has been ranked as high as tenth in the ICC Women's T20I rankings.

A member of the International Cricket Council (ICC) since 1995, Thailand's women team made their international debut when they played, and lost, two matches against Bangladesh in July 2007. The team hosted and won the 2013 ACC Women's Championship to qualify for its first ICC global tournament, the 2013 World Twenty20 Qualifier. Thailand was runner-up at the 2019 edition of the tournament and qualified for the 2020 ICC Women's T20 World Cup in Australia, the first appearance by Thailand in any cricket world championship. The team was awarded women's One Day International (ODI) status in 2022 and received their first ODI Ranking in November 2022.

== History ==
The team's first international tournament outside of Asian Cricket Council regional events was the 2013 World Twenty20 Qualifier, in which they placed fifth out of eight teams. The team was less successful at the 2015 edition of the tournament, which it hosted, winning only one match (against the Netherlands) to finish seventh.

In May 2016, Sri Lankan fast bowler Janak Gamage was named as a head coach of the team. In February 2017, Thailand played their first 50-over match, when they faced India in the 2017 Women's Cricket World Cup Qualifier in Sri Lanka. India won the match by 9 wickets. In August 2017, Thailand won the gold medal in the women's tournament at the 2017 Southeast Asian Games, going undefeated in all four of their matches.

In April 2018, the International Cricket Council (ICC) granted full Women's Twenty20 International (WT20I) status to all its members. Therefore, all Twenty20 matches played between Thailand women and other international sides since 1 July 2018 have had the full WT20I status.

On 9 June 2018, during the 2018 Women's Twenty20 Asia Cup, Thailand beat Sri Lanka by four wickets to register their first ever win against a Full Member side. In February 2019, they won the 2019 ICC Women's Qualifier Asia, therefore progressing to both the 2019 ICC Women's World Twenty20 Qualifier and the 2021 Women's Cricket World Cup Qualifier tournaments. In August 2019, during the 2019 Netherlands Women's Quadrangular Series, they won their 17th win in a row, breaking the previous record of 16 consecutive wins in WT20I cricket set by Australia. Thailand qualified to 2020 T20 World Cup in Australia after finished in top two in 2019 ICC Women's World Twenty20 Qualifier.

On 3 March 2020 at the Sydney Showground Stadium, Thailand reached 150 runs for three wickets against Pakistan, the highest total for the team in Women's T20 World Cup and at that ground, before the match was abandoned due to rain. Natthakan Chantam scored 56 to register Thailand's first Women's T20 World Cup half-century; she and Nattaya Boochatham, who scored 44, combined for an opening partnership of 93. Ironically, this would be Thailand's highest WT20 score until the following year, and was Thailand's only no-result until 2023.

In 2021, the Thai team embarked on a 15-match tour of Zimbabwe and South Africa to prepare for the Women's Cricket World Cup Qualifier, held November 2021 in Harare, Zimbabwe. At the qualifier, the team was leading Group B with three wins from four matches, when the tournament was called off, due to concerns about a new COVID variant and travel restrictions. As a consequence, the three remaining places in the World Cup were handed to Bangladesh, Pakistan and the West Indies on the basis of their Women's One Day International rankings, and Thailand, which had beaten Bangladesh but did not have such a ranking, missed out, not only on the World Cup, but also on the next round of the ICC Women's Championship. Prior to this, no team had ever won at least 3 of their first 4 matches of a qualifier without ultimately qualifying for the World Cup, and at the point the qualifiers were abandoned, Thailand would have had at least two points carried forward to the unplayed Super Six round from the aforementioned win over Bangladesh, and would only have needed to not finish last in that round to qualify for the Women's Championship. According to women's cricket historian Raf Nicholson, of Bournemouth University in England, that outcome set back women's cricket in Thailand by three years. As the use of ODI rankings meant that Thailand (and other associate member nations) would never have been able to qualify for either event, regardless of their results, in light of the cancellation, this decision has been criticized as "utterly disgraceful (and) utterly farcical".

As a result of the controversial circumstances of Thailand's failure to qualify for either event, Cricket Association of Thailand president Ravi Sehgal was reported in April 2022 as saying "We should have been given a fair chance to qualify", and it was also reported that he had petitioned the ICC and board directors in December with an impassioned plea for Thailand to be granted ODI status. In May 2022, the ICC announced Thailand as one of five women's sides to gain Women's One Day International (ODI) status. Netherlands, Papua New Guinea, Scotland and the United States are the other four teams.

In October 2022, Thailand qualified for the semifinals of the 2022 Women's Twenty20 Asia Cup, aided by their first-ever win over Pakistan, in their first encounter since the abandoned match in Sydney. In November, it was announced that the Netherlands would play 8 matches against the Thai team in Chiang Mai that month, 4 each of ODIs (Thailand's first since earning status) and WT20Is. Thailand won all four of the ODIs, and three of the four WT20Is, with the Netherlands earning their first-ever win over Thailand in the 2nd WT20I.

In February 2023, it was reported that the Thai women's team were set for their first tour of Ireland, to play three 50-over ODI matches and two T20Is in June; however, it would later be reported that the series "was cancelled due to date clashes with the Asia Cup", as Thailand was scheduled to complete in the 2023 ACC Women's T20 Emerging Teams Asia Cup in June; however, just days before the Emerging Teams Asia Cup, Thailand withdrew from the event, citing visa issues. In March, it was reported that Thailand was to host Zimbabwe for 3 ODIs in April, later amended to 3 ODIs and 4 WT20Is. In May, it was announced that Thailand would tour the Netherlands in July for a second ODI series with the Netherlands, and a trilateral T20 series with both teams and Scotland.

In February 2024, the team participated in the 2024 ACC Premier Cup, which served as a qualification pathway for the 2024 Women's Asia Cup. According to the ACC pathway structure and calendar, revised in 2022, the two finalists of the ACC Premier Cup would qualify for the Women's Asia Cup. As a result, upon their loss to the United Arab Emirates in the Premier Cup semi-final, it was reported that Thailand would not qualify for the 2024 Asia Cup. However, at the end of March 2024, the ACC retroactively awarded the semi-finalists of the 2024 Premier Cup qualification to the expanded eight-team 2024 Women's Asia Cup. This confirmed Nepal and Thailand as additional participants, and will mark Thailand's fifth appearance in the tournament.

== Tournament history ==
=== ICC Women's World Cup ===
World Cup record
| Year | Round | Position | GP | W | L | T | NR |
|---|---|---|---|---|---|---|---|
| (England) 1973 | Did not qualify | | | | | | |
| (India) 1978 | Did not qualify | | | | | | |
| (New Zealand) 1982 | Did not qualify | | | | | | |
| (Australia) 1988 | Did not qualify | | | | | | |
| (England) 1993 | Did not qualify | | | | | | |
| (India) 1997 | Did not qualify | | | | | | |
| (New Zealand) 2000 | Did not qualify | | | | | | |
| (South Africa) 2005 | Did not qualify | | | | | | |
| (Australia) 2009 | Did not qualify | | | | | | |
| (India) 2013 | Did not qualify | | | | | | |
| (England) 2017 | Did not qualify | | | | | | |
| (New Zealand) 2022 | Did not qualify | | | | | | |
| (India) 2025 | Did not qualify | | | | | | |
| Total | 0/12 | 0 Titles | 0 | 0 | 0 | 0 | 0 |

=== ICC Women's Cricket World Cup Qualifier ===
ICC Women's Cricket World Cup Qualifier records
| Host Year | Round | Position | GP | W | L | T | NR |
|---|---|---|---|---|---|---|---|
| (Netherlands) 2003 | Did not participate | | | | | | |
| (South Africa) 2008 | Did not participate | | | | | | |
| (Bangladesh) 2011 | Did not participate | | | | | | |
| (Sri Lanka) 2017 | Did not qualify | – | 4 | 0 | 4 | 0 | 0 |
| (Zimbabwe) 2021 | Tournament postponed due to COVID-19 pandemic | – | 4 | 3 | 1 | 0 | 0 |
| (Pakistan) 2025 | Did not qualify | 5/6 | 5 | 0 | 5 | 0 | 0 |
| Total | 4/6 | 0 Title | 13 | 3 | 10 | 0 | 0 |

=== ICC Women's T20 World Cup ===
Twenty20 World Cup Record
| Year | Round | Position | GP | W | L | T | NR |
|---|---|---|---|---|---|---|---|
| (England) 2009 | Did not qualify | | | | | | |
| (Cricket West Indies) 2010 | Did not qualify | | | | | | |
| (Sri Lanka) 2012 | Did not qualify | | | | | | |
| (Bangladesh) 2014 | Did not qualify | | | | | | |
| (India) 2016 | Did not qualify | | | | | | |
| (Cricket West Indies) 2018 | Did not qualify | | | | | | |
| (Australia) 2020 | Group stages | – | 4 | 0 | 3 | 0 | 1 |
| (South Africa) 2023 | Did not qualify | | | | | | |
| (United Arab Emirates) 2024 | Did not qualify | | | | | | |
| Total | 1/8 | Group stage | 4 | 0 | 3 | 0 | 1 |

=== ICC Women's T20 World Cup Qualifier ===
ICC Women's World Twenty20 Qualifier record
| Year | Round | Position | GP | W | L | T | NR |
|---|---|---|---|---|---|---|---|
| (Republic of Ireland) 2013 | Did not qualify | | | | | | |
| (Thailand) 2015 | DNQ | 7th | 4 | 0 | 4 | 0 | 0 |
| (Netherlands) 2018 | DNQ | 5th | 3 | 0 | 3 | 0 | 0 |
| (Scotland) 2019 | Qualified | 2nd | 5 | 4 | 1 | 0 | 0 |
| (United Arab Emirates) 2022 | DNQ | 4th | 5 | 2 | 3 | 0 | 0 |
| (United Arab Emirates) 2024 | DNQ | 5th | 4 | 2 | 2 | 0 | 0 |
| (Nepal) 2026 | To be determined | | | | | | |
| Total | 5/6 | 0 Titles | 17 | 6 | 11 | 0 | 0 |

=== ICC Women's World Twenty20 Asia Qualifier ===
ICC Women's World Twenty20 Asia Qualifier record
| Year | Round | Position | GP | W | L | T | NR |
|---|---|---|---|---|---|---|---|
| (Thailand) 2017 | Qualified to the Global Qualifiers | 1/6 | 5 | 4 | 0 | 0 | 1 |
| (Thailand) 2019 | Qualified to the Global Qualifiers | 1/7 | 6 | 6 | 0 | 0 | 0 |
| (United Arab Emirates) 2021 | Did not participate | | | | | | |
| (Malaysia) 2023 | DNQ | 2/11 | 6 | 4 | 1 | 0 | 1 |
| (Thailand) 2025 | Qualified to the Global Qualifier s | 1/9 | 6 | 4 | 0 | 0 | 2 |
| Total | 4/4 | 3 Titles | 23 | 18 | 1 | 0 | 4 |

=== Women's Asia Cup (T20I format) ===
Women's Asia Cup Record
| Year | Round | Position | GP | W | L | T | NR |
|---|---|---|---|---|---|---|---|
| (Sri Lanka) 2004 | Did not participate (ODI format) | | | | | | |
| (Pakistan) 2005–06 | Did not participate (ODI format) | | | | | | |
| (India) 2006 | Did not participate (ODI format) | | | | | | |
| (Sri Lanka) 2008 | Did not participate (ODI format) | | | | | | |
| (China) 2012 | Group stage | 6/8 | 3 | 1 | 2 | 0 | 0 |
| (Thailand) 2016 | Group stage | 5/6 | 5 | 1 | 4 | 0 | 0 |
| (Malaysia) 2018 | Group stage | 4/6 | 5 | 2 | 3 | 0 | 0 |
| (Bangladesh) 2022 | Semi-finals | 4/7 | 7 | 3 | 4 | 0 | 0 |
| (Sri Lanka) 2024 | Group stage | 5/8 | 3 | 1 | 2 | 0 | 0 |
| Total | 5/9 | | 20 | 7 | 13 | 0 | 0 |

=== Asian Games (T20I format) ===
Asian Games record
| Year | Round | Position | GP | W | L | T | NR |
|---|---|---|---|---|---|---|---|
| (China) 2010 | First Round | 5/8 | 3 | 1 | 2 | 0 | 0 |
| (South Korea) 2014 | Quarter-finals | 5/10 | 3 | 2 | 1 | 0 | 0 |
| (China) 2022 | Quarter-finals | 5/9 | 1 | 0 | 1 | 0 | 0 |
| Total | | | 7 | 3 | 4 | 0 | 0 |

=== Southeast Asian Games (T20I format) ===
Southeast Asian Games record
| Year | Round | Position | GP | W | L | T | NR |
|---|---|---|---|---|---|---|---|
| (Malaysia) 2017 | Gold Medal | 1/4 | 4 | 4 | 0 | 0 | 0 |
| (Cambodia) 2023 | Gold Medal | 1/7 | 4 | 4 | 0 | 0 | 0 |
| Total | | | 8 | 8 | 0 | 0 | 0 |

== Records and statistics ==
International Match Summary — Thailand Women

Last updated 18 November 2026

Playing Record
| Format | M | W | L | T | NR | Inaugural Match |
| One Day Internationals | 17 | 11 | 6 | 0 | 0 | 20 November 2022 |
| Twenty20 Internationals | 152 | 99 | 51 | 0 | 2 | 3 June 2018 |

=== One-Day International ===
ODI record versus other nations

Records complete to WODI #1559. Last updated 17 August 2026.

| Opponent | Matches | Won | Lost | Tied | N/R | First match | First win |
|---|---|---|---|---|---|---|---|
ICC Full members
| Bangladesh | 1 | 0 | 1 | 0 | 0 | 10 April 2025 | |
| Ireland | 1 | 0 | 1 | 0 | 0 | 15 April 2025 | |
| Pakistan | 1 | 0 | 1 | 0 | 0 | 17 April 2025 | |
| West Indies | 1 | 0 | 1 | 0 | 0 | 19 April 2025 | |
| Zimbabwe | 3 | 3 | 0 | 0 | 0 | 19 April 2023 | 19 April 2023 |
ICC Associate members
| Netherlands | 6 | 5 | 1 | 0 | 0 | 20 November 2022 | 20 November 2022 |
| Papua New Guinea | 3 | 3 | 0 | 0 | 0 | 13 August 2026 | 13 August 2026 |
| Scotland | 1 | 0 | 1 | 0 | 0 | 13 April 2025 | |

=== Twenty20 International ===
- Highest team total: 259/4 v. Singapore on 16 December 2025 at Terdthai Cricket Ground, Bangkok.
- Highest individual score: 148*, Natthakan Chantam v. Singapore on 16 December 2025 at Terdthai Cricket Ground, Bangkok.
- Best individual bowling figures: 5/4, Chanida Sutthiruang v. Indonesia on 15 January 2019 at Asian Institute of Technology Ground, Bangkok.

Most T20I runs for Thailand Women

| Player | Runs | Average | Career span |
|---|---|---|---|
| Nannapat Koncharoenkai | 3,018 | 29.58 | 2018–2026 |
| Natthakan Chantam | 2,892 | 30.76 | 2018–2026 |
| Naruemol Chaiwai | 2,195 | 23.35 | 2018–2026 |
| Chanida Sutthiruang | 1,290 | 13.72 | 2018–2026 |
| Nattaya Boochatham | 1,035 | 12.62 | 2018–2025 |

Most T20I wickets for Thailand Women

| Player | Wickets | Average | Career span |
|---|---|---|---|
| Thipatcha Putthawong | 175 | 9.73 | 2019–2026 |
| Onnicha Kamchomphu | 159 | 12.27 | 2018–2026 |
| Suleeporn Laomi | 143 | 12.18 | 2018–2026 |
| Nattaya Boochatham | 126 | 10.89 | 2018–2025 |
| Chanida Sutthiruang | 97 | 14.64 | 2018–2026 |

T20I record versus other nations

Records complete to WT20I #3082. Last updated 18 November 2026.

| Opponent | M | W | L | T | NR | First match | First win |
|---|---|---|---|---|---|---|---|
ICC Full members
| Bangladesh | 9 | 0 | 9 | 0 | 0 | 7 June 2018 | |
| England | 1 | 0 | 1 | 0 | 0 | 26 February 2020 | |
| India | 4 | 0 | 4 | 0 | 0 | 4 June 2018 | |
| Ireland | 6 | 3 | 3 | 0 | 0 | 7 July 2018 | 9 August 2019 |
| Pakistan | 6 | 1 | 4 | 0 | 1 | 3 June 2018 | 6 October 2022 |
| South Africa | 1 | 0 | 1 | 0 | 0 | 28 February 2020 | |
| Sri Lanka | 5 | 1 | 4 | 0 | 0 | 9 June 2018 | 9 June 2018 |
| West Indies | 1 | 0 | 1 | 0 | 0 | 22 February 2020 | |
| Zimbabwe | 11 | 5 | 6 | 0 | 0 | 27 August 2021 | 28 August 2021 |
ICC Associate members
| Bahrain | 1 | 1 | 0 | 0 | 0 | 4 June 2026 | 4 June 2026 |
| Bhutan | 2 | 2 | 0 | 0 | 0 | 16 January 2019 | 16 January 2019 |
| China | 4 | 4 | 0 | 0 | 0 | 18 February 2019 | 18 February 2019 |
| Hong Kong | 8 | 8 | 0 | 0 | 0 | 14 January 2019 | 14 January 2019 |
| Indonesia | 4 | 4 | 0 | 0 | 0 | 15 January 2019 | 15 January 2019 |
| Japan | 1 | 1 | 0 | 0 | 0 | 9 June 2026 | 9 June 2026 |
| Kuwait | 5 | 4 | 0 | 0 | 1 | 24 February 2019 | 24 February 2019 |
| Malaysia | 9 | 9 | 0 | 0 | 0 | 6 June 2018 | 6 June 2018 |
| Mongolia | 1 | 1 | 0 | 0 | 0 | 3 June 2026 | 3 June 2026 |
| Myanmar | 6 | 6 | 0 | 0 | 0 | 12 January 2019 | 12 January 2019 |
| Namibia | 5 | 5 | 0 | 0 | 0 | 1 September 2019 | 1 September 2019 |
| Nepal | 9 | 9 | 0 | 0 | 0 | 19 January 2019 | 19 January 2019 |
| Netherlands | 15 | 10 | 5 | 0 | 0 | 10 August 2019 | 10 August 2019 |
| Papua New Guinea | 6 | 4 | 2 | 0 | 0 | 5 September 2019 | 5 September 2019 |
| Philippines | 1 | 1 | 0 | 0 | 0 | 1 May 2023 | 1 May 2023 |
| Scotland | 9 | 3 | 6 | 0 | 0 | 10 July 2018 | 8 August 2019 |
| Singapore | 2 | 2 | 0 | 0 | 0 | 13 February 2024 | 13 February 2024 |
| Tanzania | 1 | 1 | 0 | 0 | 0 | 25 November 2025 | 25 November 2025 |
| Uganda | 4 | 3 | 1 | 0 | 0 | 8 July 2018 | 14 July 2018 |
| United Arab Emirates | 12 | 9 | 3 | 0 | 0 | 12 July 2018 | 12 July 2018 |
| United States | 3 | 2 | 1 | 0 | 0 | 12 September 2022 | 12 September 2022 |

== Current squad ==
This lists all players who played for Thailand or were picked in the latest One-day or T20I squad.

| Name | Age | Batting style | Bowling style | Forms | Notes |
Batters
| Naruemol Chaiwai | 36 | Right-handed | Right-arm medium | ODI & T20I | Captain |
| Natthakan Chantam | 30 | Right-handed | Right-arm medium-fast | ODI & T20I | |
All-rounders
| Chanida Sutthiruang | 33 | Right-handed | Right-arm medium | ODI & T20I | |
| Sornnarin Tippoch | 40 | Left-handed | Right-arm off break | ODI & T20I | |
| Rosenanee Kanoh | 27 | Right-handed | Right-arm off break | ODI & T20I | |
Wicket-keeper
| Nannapat Koncharoenkai | 26 | Right-handed | - | ODI & T20I | Vice-captain |
| Banthida Leephatthana | 20 | Right-handed | - | ODI | |
| Suwanan Khiato | 22 | Right-handed | - | ODI & T20I | |
Spin Bowlers
| Thipatcha Putthawong | 22 | Left-handed | Slow left-arm orthodox | ODI & T20I | |
| Nattaya Boochatham | 39 | Left-handed | Right-arm off break | ODI & T20I | |
| Onnicha Kamchomphu | 28 | Right-handed | Right-arm off break | ODI & T20I | |
| Suleeporn Laomi | 28 | Right-handed | Right-arm leg break | ODI | |
| Nanthita Boonsukham | 28 | Right-handed | Right-arm leg break | ODI & T20I | |
| Sunida Chaturongrattana | 22 | Right-handed | Right-arm off break | ODI & T20I | |
Pace Bowlers
| Phannita Maya | 22 | Right-handed | Right-arm medium | ODI & T20I | |
| Kanyaorn Bunthansen | 23 | Right-handed | Right-arm medium | T20I | |

Last updated as on 9 September 2023.

== See also ==
- Thailand national cricket team, the men's team
- List of Thailand women Twenty20 International cricketers
- List of Thailand women ODI cricketers
