= List of women's Twenty20 International cricket hat-tricks =

A hat-trick in cricket is when a bowler takes three wickets in consecutive deliveries, dismissing three different batsmen. It is a relatively rare event in Women's Twenty20 International (WT20I) cricket with only 64 occurrences in over 3,000 matches.

The first hat-trick in WT20Is was taken by Asmavia Iqbal of Pakistan, playing against England in Loughborough on 5 September 2012.

== Hat-tricks by national team ==
T20I hat-tricks by team
Team	Hat-tricks
Thailand	7
United Arab Emirates	5
Nepal	4
Hong Kong	3
West Indies	3
Zimbabwe	3
Bangladesh	3
Australia	2
Brazil	2
England	2
Germany	2
Japan	2
Jersey	2
Nigeria	2
Pakistan	2
Rwanda	2
Uganda	2
Vanuatu	2
Austria	1
Botswana	1
Canada	1
Gibraltar	1
India	1
Isle of Man	1
Kenya	1
Malaysia	1
Myanmar	1
New Zealand	1
Papua New Guinea	1
South Africa	1
Sri Lanka	1
Sweden	1
Total	64

== Key ==
Key
	Hat-trick taken in a World Cup match
(b)	Bowled
(c)	Caught
(c b)	Caught and bowled
(lbw)	Leg before wicket
(st)	Stumped
†	Wicket-keeper
Result	Result for the team for which the hat-trick was taken

== Hat-tricks ==
Women's Twenty20 International cricket hat-tricks
No.	Bowler	For	Against	Inn.	Batters dismissed	Venue	Date	Result	Ref.
1	Asmavia Iqbal	Pakistan	England	1	Sarah Taylor (lbw); Arran Brindle (b); Danielle Wyatt (c sub)	(England) Haslegrave Ground, Loughborough	5 September 2012	Lost	
2	Ekta Bisht	India	Sri Lanka	1	Dilani Manodara (c Nagarajan Niranjana); Yasoda Mendis (c & b); Eshani Lokusuriyage (c Jhulan Goswami)	(Sri Lanka) Nondescripts Cricket Club Ground, Colombo	3 October 2012	Won	
3	Marizanne Kapp	South Africa	Bangladesh	1	Rumana Ahmed (c †Trisha Chetty); Ritu Moni (b); Fahima Khatun (b)	(South Africa) Senwes Park, Potchefstroom	14 September 2013	Won	
4	Natalie Sciver	England	New Zealand	2	Maddy Green (c Holly Colvin); Erin Bermingham (b); Frances Mackay (lbw)	(Barbados) Kensington Oval, Bridgetown	22 October 2013	Won	
5	Sana Mir	Pakistan	Sri Lanka	2	Ama Kanchana (b); Maduri Samuddika (lbw); Inoka Ranaweera (lbw)	(United Arab Emirates) Sharjah Cricket Stadium, Sharjah	16 January 2015	Won	
6	Anna Peterson	New Zealand	Australia	2	Jess Jonassen (c Katie Perkins); Alyssa Healy (c Maddy Green); Megan Schutt (c Suzie Bates)	(Australia) Kardinia Park, Geelong	19 February 2017	Won	
7	Megan Schutt	Australia	India	2	Smriti Mandhana (b); Mithali Raj (b); Deepti Sharma (c Amanda-Jade Wellington)	(India) Brabourne Stadium, Mumbai	26 March 2018	Won	
8	Fahima Khatun	Bangladesh	United Arab Emirates	2	Udeni Dona (c Rumana Ahmed); Esha Rohit (c Nahida Akter); Kavisha Egodage (lbw)	(Netherlands) Sportpark Maarschalkerweerd, Utrecht	10 July 2018	Won	
9	Anisa Mohammed^{1}	West Indies	South Africa	1	Marizanne Kapp (st †Merissa Aguilleira); Saarah Smith (b); Masabata Klaas (c Hayley Matthews)	(Trinidad and Tobago) Brian Lara Stadium, Tarouba	28 September 2018	Won	
10	Anya Shrubsole	England	South Africa	1	Shabnim Ismail (b); Masabata Klaas (c Tammy Beaumont); Yolani Fourie (b)	(Saint Lucia) Darren Sammy Cricket Ground, Gros Islet	16 November 2018	Won	
11	Chanida Sutthiruang	Thailand	China	1	Caiyun Zhou (b); [Zheng Lili (b); Huang Zhuo (lbw)	(Thailand) Terdthai Cricket Ground, Bangkok	18 February 2019	Won	
12	Rubina Belbashi	Nepal	Kuwait	2	Khadija Khalil (b); Madeeha Zuberi (b); Zeefa Jilani (b)	(Thailand) Asian Institute of Technology Ground, Bangkok	27 February 2019	Won	
13	Blessing Etim	Nigeria	Mozambique	1	Rosalia Haiong (b); Palmira Cuinica (b); Olga Mondlane (c †Oyewole Oyronke)	(Zimbabwe) Old Hararians, Harare	6 May 2019	Won	
14	Concy Aweko (1/2)	Uganda	Kenya	2	Venasa Ooko (lbw); Esther Wachira (st †Kevin Awino); Mercyline Ochieng (st †Kevin Awino)	(Zimbabwe) Old Hararians, Harare	8 May 2019	Won	
15	Onnicha Kamchomphu (1/2)	Thailand	Ireland	1	Laura Delany (c †Nannapat Koncharoenkai); Eimear Richardson (c & b); Sophie MacMahon (b)	(Netherlands) Sportpark Het Schootsveld, Deventer	13 August 2019	Won	
16	Kary Chan (1/2)	Hong Kong	China	2	Huang Zhuo (c Mariko Hill); Wu Juan (cricketer)|Wu Juan (b); Li Haoye (lbw)	(South Korea) Yeonhui Cricket Ground, Incheon	19 September 2019	Won	
17	Anjali Chand	Nepal	Maldives	1	Eashal Ibrahim (c Rubina Belbashi); Kinaanath Ismail (st †Mamta Chaudhary); Shamma Ali (b)	(Nepal) Pokhara Stadium, Pokhara	2 December 2019	Won	
18	Anne Bierwisch	Germany	Austria	1	Jo-Antoinette Stiglitz (c Christina Gough); Priya Sabu (b); Sylvia Kailath (b)	Seebarn Cricket Ground, Lower Austria	13 August 2020	Won	
19	Anuradha Doddaballapur	Germany	Austria	2	Jo-Antoinette Stiglitz (c Janet Ronalds); Tugce Kazanci (b); Anisha Nookala (b); Priya Sabu (b)	Seebarn Cricket Ground, Lower Austria	14 August 2020	Won	
20	Stafanie Taylor	West Indies	Pakistan	1	Fatima Sana (lbw); Diana Baig (st Kycia Knight); Anam Amin (b)	(Cricket West Indies) Sir Vivian Richards Stadium, Antigua	4 July 2021	Won	
21	Shameelah Mosweu	Botswana	Mozambique	2	Tania Chiracheque (b); Alcinda Cossa (b); Rosalia Haiong (b); Isabel Chuma (b)	Botswana Cricket Association Oval, Gaborone	10 September 2021	Won	
22	Concy Aweko (2/2)	Uganda	Cameroon	2	Maeva Douma (c Prosscovia Alako); Michele Ekani (b); Marguerite Bessala (c Janet Mbabazi)	Botswana Cricket Association Oval, Gaborone	12 September 2021	Won	
23	Laura Cardoso (1/2)	Brazil	Canada	2	Hala Azmat (b); Hiba Shamshad (b); Sana Zafar (c Roberta Moretti Avery)	(Mexico) Reforma Athletic Club, Naucalpan	25 October 2021	Won	
24	Lavanya Keny	United Arab Emirates	Saudi Arabia	1	Emaan Ejaz (b); Simrah Mirza (st †Theertha Satish); Khazaima (c Vaishnave Mahesh)	Oman Cricket Academy Ground Turf 2, Muscat	24 March 2022	Won	
25	Lillian Udeh	Nigeria	Ghana	1	Miriam Eshun (b); Rhyda Ofori (lbw); Rozabel Asumadu (c b)	(Nigeria) Tafawa Balewa Square Cricket Oval, Lagos	1 April 2022	Won	
26	Nomvelo Sibanda	Zimbabwe	Namibia	1	Jurriene Diergaardt (b); Kayleen Green (b); Sune Wittmann (c Modester Mupachikwa)	(Namibia) Trans Namib Ground, Windhoek	26 April 2022	Won	
27	Mary Mwangi	Kenya	Botswana	2	Goabilwe Matome (lbw); Tuelo Shadrack (lbw); Oratile Kgeresi (b)	(Rwanda) IPRC Cricket Ground, Kigali	9 June 2022	Won	
28	Hollan Doriga	Papua New Guinea	Fiji	2	Ateca Kainoco (b); Maeavhanisi Erasito (c Vicky Araa); Melaia Biu (lbw)	(Vanuatu) Ground 2, Independence Park, Port Vila	3 October 2022	Won	
29	Fariha Trisna (1/2)	Bangladesh	Malaysia	2	Winifred Duraisingham (b); Mas Elysa (lbw); Mahirah Izzati Ismail (b)	(Bangladesh) Sylhet International Cricket Stadium, Sylhet	6 October 2022	Won	
30	Heather Graham	Australia	India	2	Devika Vaidya (st †Beth Mooney); Radha Yadav (b); Renuka Singh (b)	(India) Brabourne Stadium, Mumbai	20 December 2022	Won	
31	Henriette Ishimwe	Rwanda	Ghana	2	Rozabel Asumadu (b); Ivy Yeboah (b); Emmanuella Nyaaba (b)	(Nigeria) Tafawa Balewa Square, Lagos	27 March 2023	Won	
32	Audrey Mazvishaya	Zimbabwe	Thailand	2	Rosenan Kanoh (c Josephine Nkomo); Suleeporn Laomi (b); Onnicha Kamchomphu (st †Pellagia Mujaji)	(Thailand) Terdthai Cricket Ground, Bangkok	25 April 2023	Won	
33	Khushi Sharma	United Arab Emirates	Uganda	2	Stephani Nampiina (b); Phiona Kulume (b); Evelyn Anyipo (b)	(Namibia) United Ground, Windhoek	25 April 2023	Won	
34	Hayley Matthews	West Indies	Ireland	1	Rebecca Stokell (b); Arlene Kelly (c Afy Fletcher); Ava Canning (b)	(Cricket West Indies) Daren Sammy Cricket Ground, Gros Islet	08 July 2023	Won	
35	Thipatcha Putthawong (1/2)	Thailand	Netherlands	1	Phebe Molkenboer (b); Mikkie Zwilling (b); Hannah Landheer (b); Caroline de Lange (b)	(Netherlands) Sportpark Maarschalkerweerd, Utrecht	14 July 2023	Won	
36	Kary Chan (2/2)	Hong Kong	Japan	1	Meg Ogawa (b); Shrunali Ranade (b); Nonoha Yasumoto (c † Hiu Ying Cheung)	Hong Kong Cricket Club, Wong Nai Chung Gap	15 November 2023	Won	
37	Iqra Sahar	Hong Kong	Nepal	1	Samjhana Khadka (st † Hiu Ying Cheung); Kajal Shrestha (c † Hiu Ying Cheung); Indu Barma (b)	Hong Kong Cricket Club, Wong Nai Chung Gap	16 November 2023	Won	
38	Precious Marange	Zimbabwe	Uganda	1	Concy Aweko (lbw); Irene Alumo (c †Chiedza Dhururu); Evelyn Anyipo (c †Chiedza Dhururu)	(Uganda) Entebbe Cricket Oval, Entebbe	17 December 2023	Won	
39	Ahilya Chandel	Japan	China	2	Han Lili (c Haruna Iwasaki); Mengting Liu (b); Xu Qian (b); Yang Yu Xuan (lbw)	(Malaysia) Royal Selangor Club, Kuala Lumpur	11 February 2024	Won	
40	Mahirah Izzati Ismail	Malaysia	Bahrain	2	Pavithra Shetty (lbw); Durriya Malik (st Aina Najwa); Sana Butt (lbw)	(Malaysia) Bayuemas Oval, Pandamaran	13 February 2024	Won	
41	Heena Hotchandani	United Arab Emirates	Indonesia	2	Ni Luh Dewi (lbw); Maria Corazon (b); Mia Arda (lbw)	(Malaysia) UKM-YSD Cricket Oval, Bangi	14 February 2024	Won	
42	Sita Rana Magar	Nepal	Kuwait	1	Priyada Murali (lbw); Maryam Omar (st †Kajal Shrestha); Amna Tariq (lbw)	(Malaysia) UKM-YSD Cricket Oval, Bangi	14 February 2024	Won	
43	Fariha Trisna (2/2)	Bangladesh	Australia	1	Ellyse Perry (c Shorna Akter); Sophie Molineux (c Murshida Khatun); Beth Mooney (b)	(Bangladesh) Sher-e-Bangla National Cricket Stadium, Mirpur	2 April 2024	Lost	
44	Andrea-Mae Zepeda	Austria	Denmark	2	Maria Karlsen (c †Emma Kirkman); Kathrine Brock-Nielsen (c †Emma Kirkman); Luise Christensen (c †Emma Kirkman)	Seebarn Cricket Ground, Lower Austria	4 May 2024	Won	
45	Joanne Hicks	Isle of Man	Malta	1	Likitha Yadav (c & b); Stella Arooja (c Clare Crowe); Thambi Saraba (c Lucy Barnett)	(Malta) Marsa Sports Club, Marsa	18 August 2024	Won	
46	Zar Win	Myanmar	Singapore	2	Laasya Bommareddy (b); Roshni Seth (b); Piumi Gurusinghe (lbw)	Singapore National Cricket Ground, Singapore	27 October 2024	Won	
47	Selina Solman	Vanuatu	France	1	Nellie Qaeze (b); Rose Siwa (b); Nasheng Ihmeling (c & b)	(New Caledonia) N'Du Stadium, Nouméa	11 March 2025	Won	
48	Florence Tanguy	Jersey	Isle of Man	1	Sam Hassall (c Grace Wetherall); Rebecca Webster (lbw); Rachel Overman (b)	(Cyprus) Happy Valley Ground 2, Episkopi	19 April 2025	Won	
49	Onnicha Kamchomphu (2/2)	Thailand	Nepal	2	Roma Thapa (lbw); Ishwori Bist (b); Riya Sharma (lbw)	(Thailand) Terdthai Cricket Ground, Bangkok	20 May 2025	Won	
50	Chloe Greechan	Jersey	Sweden	1	Zara Mohammad (st Mia Maguire); Gaya Jayaweera (c Grace Wetherall); Hareer Chamto (c Annabel Mossop)	(Italy) Simar Cricket Ground, Rome	29 May 2025	Lost	
51	Gaya Jayaweera	Sweden	Jersey	2	Annabel Mossop (c Kanchan Rana); Nia Greig (c Anya Vaidya); Kate Follain (b)	(Italy) Simar Cricket Ground, Rome	29 May 2025	Won	
52	Erika Toguchi-Quinn	Japan	Philippines	2	Reyven Castillo (st Hinase Goto); Ashley Miranda (b); Jessica Medianesca (c Ayaka Kato-Stafford)	(Japan) Sano International Cricket Ground, Sano	7 June 2025	Won	
53	Helen Mumford	Gibraltar	Estonia	2	Liina Sormus (c Nikki Caruana); Chamali Lokuge (c Noelle Laguea); Asma Shifa (lbw)	Estonian National Cricket and Rugby Field, Estonia	3 August 2025	Won	
54	Rachel Andrew	Vanuatu	Indonesia	2	Ni Luh Dewi Wesika (b); Dara Paramitha (b); Ni Putri Suwandewi (lbw)	(Fiji) Albert Park Ground 1, Suva	9 September 2025	Won	
55	Samaira Dharnidharka (1/2)	United Arab Emirates	Zimbabwe	2	Nyasha Gwanzura (b); Modester Mupachikwa (lbw); Loreen Tshuma (b)	(Zimbabwe) Queens Sports Club, Bulawayo	5 October 2025	Won	
56	Achini Perera	Canada	Tanzania	2	Perice Kamunya (lbw); Saumu Hussein (b); Sophia Jerome (c †Habeeba Bader)	(Tanzania) Gymkhana Club Ground, Dar es Salaam	5 November 2025	Won	
57	Sunida Chaturongrattana	Thailand	Singapore	2	Haresh Dhavina (lbw); Jenissa Jain (lbw); Pushpa Murali (b)	(Thailand) Terdthai Cricket Ground, Bangkok	16 December 2025	Won	
58	Samaira Dharnidharka (2/2)	United Arab Emirates	Bahrain	2	Sadamali Bhakshala (c †Theertha Satish); Sudeshika Ranawaka (c Michelle Botha); Reshel D'Souza (lbw)	Oman Cricket Academy Ground Turf 1, Muscat	18 December 2025	Won	
59	Marie Bimenyimana	Rwanda	Nigeria	1	Adeshola Adekunle (b); Usen Peace (b); Annointed Akhigbe (b)	(Nigeria) Tafawa Balewa Square Cricket Oval, Lagos	28 March 2026	Lost	
60	Laura Cardoso (2/2)	Brazil	Lesotho	2	Kananelo Molapo (b); Kananelo Mabitle (lbw); Makopano Mabathoana (lbw); Tshepang Khabo (lbw); Maneo Nyabela (b)	Botswana Cricket Association Oval 2, Gaborone	9 April 2026	Won	
61	Kabita Kunwar	Nepal	Vanuatu	2	Gillian Chilia (b); Alvina Chilia (b); Anna Griffin (b)	(Rwanda) Gahanga International Cricket Stadium, Kigali	30 April 2026	Won	
62	Thipatcha Putthawong (2/2)	Thailand	Mongolia	1	Gansuk Anujin (b); Myagmarzaya Batnasan (st †Nannapat Koncharoenkai); Uugansuvd Bayarjavkhlan (c & b)	(Malaysia) Selangor Turf Club, Kuala Lumpur	3 June 2026	Won	
63	Phannita Maya	Thailand	Indonesia	1	Ni Ariani (b); Sang Maypriani (lbw); Dara Paramitha (lbw)	(Malaysia) Bayuemas Oval, Pandamaran	12 June 2026	Won	
64	Chamari Athapaththu	Sri Lanka	Indonesia	2	Ni Ariani (b); Sang Maypriani (lbw); Dara Paramitha (lbw)	(United Arab Emirates) Dubai International Cricket Stadium, Dubai	2 September 2026	Won	

== See also ==
- List of women's international cricket hat-tricks
- List of Twenty20 International cricket hat-tricks
- Women's Twenty20 International
