= 2024 Women's T20 World Cup Global Qualifier =

2024 ICC Women's T20 World Cup Qualifier
- Dates: 25 April – 7 May 2024
- Administrator: International Cricket Council
- Cricket format: Twenty20 International
- Tournament format(s): Group round-robin and playoffs
- Host: United Arab Emirates
- Champions: Sri Lanka (2nd title)
- Runners-up: Scotland
- Participants: 10
- Matches: 23
- Player of the series: (Scotland) Kathryn Bryce
- Most runs: (Sri Lanka) Chamari Athapaththu (226)
- Most wickets: (Scotland) Rachel Slater (11)
- Official website: International Cricket Council

The 2024 ICC Women's T20 World Cup Qualifier was an international cricket tournament held in April and May 2024 in Abu Dhabi. It was the sixth edition of the ICC Women's T20 World Cup Qualifier and served as the qualification tournament for the 2024 ICC Women's T20 World Cup tournament.

The ten participating teams were divided in two groups of five. The two finalists (Scotland and Sri Lanka) qualified for the 2024 Women's T20 World Cup. Scotland qualified for their first women's T20 World Cup after defeating Ireland by eight wickets in their semi-final match. Sri Lanka, who had defeated hosts United Arab Emirates in the other semi-final, won the final of the qualifier by 68 runs.

== Qualification ==
Means of Qualification	Date	Host	Berths	Qualified
Automatic Qualifications
2023 T20 World Cup	10–26 February 2023	South Africa	2	Ireland
2023 T20 World Cup	10–26 February 2023	South Africa	2	Sri Lanka
Regional Qualifications
Asia	31 August–9 September 2023	Malaysia	2	Thailand
Asia	31 August–9 September 2023	Malaysia	2	United Arab Emirates
East Asia-Pacific	1–8 September 2023	Vanuatu	1	Vanuatu
Americas	4–11 September 2023	United States	1	United States
Europe	6–12 September 2023	Spain	2	Netherlands
Europe	6–12 September 2023	Spain	2	Scotland
Africa	9–17 December 2023	Uganda	2	Uganda
Africa	9–17 December 2023	Uganda	2	Zimbabwe
Total			10	

== Squads ==
Ireland	Netherlands	Scotland	Sri Lanka	Thailand
Laura Delany (c); Ava Canning; Alana Dalzell; Georgina Dempsey; Amy Hunter (wk); Arlene Kelly; Gaby Lewis; Louise Little; Joanna Loughran (wk); Jane Maguire; Cara Murray; Leah Paul; Orla Prendergast; Eimear Richardson; Rebecca Stokell	Heather Siegers (c); Merel Dekeling; Caroline de Lange; Babette de Leede (wk); Sterre Kalis; Sanya Khurana; Hannah Landheer; Eva Lynch; Phebe Molkenboer; Frederique Overdijk; Robine Rijke; Silver Siegers; Carlijn van Koolwijk; Jolien van Vliet; Iris Zwilling	Kathryn Bryce (c) (Note: Sarah Bryce captained Scotland in the Final.); Chloe Abel; Sarah Bryce (wk); Darcey Carter; Priyanaz Chatterji; Katherine Fraser; Saskia Horley; Lorna Jack (wk); Ailsa Lister (wk); Abtaha Maqsood; Megan McColl; Hannah Rainey; Nayma Sheikh; Rachel Slater; Ellen Watson (wk)	Chamari Athapaththu (c); Nilakshi de Silva; Kavisha Dilhari; Shashini Gimhani; Vishmi Gunaratne; Hansima Karunaratne; Kawya Kavindi; Achini Kulasuriya; Sugandika Kumari; Hasini Perera; Udeshika Prabodhani; Inoshi Priyadharshani; Inoka Ranaweera; Harshitha Samarawickrama; Anushka Sanjeewani (wk)	Naruemol Chaiwai (c); Thipatcha Putthawong (vc); Nattaya Boochatham; Nannaphat Chaihan; Natthakan Chantham; Sunida Chaturongrattana; Onnicha Kamchomphu; Rosenanee Kanoh; Suwanan Khiaoto (wk); Suleeporn Laomi; Phannita Maya; Chayanisa Phengpaen; Chanida Sutthiruang; Aphisara Suwanchonrathi
Uganda	United Arab Emirates	United States	Vanuatu	Zimbabwe
Janet Mbabazi (c); Rita Musamali (vc); Sarah Akiteng; Prosscovia Alako; Lorna Anyait; Evelyn Anyipo; Malisa Ariokot; Concy Aweko; Kevin Awino (wk); Esther Iloku; Phiona Kulume; Immaculate Nakisuuyi; Stephani Nampiina; Gloria Obukor; Sarah Walaza	Esha Oza (c, wk); Samaira Dharnidharka; Kavisha Egodage; Siya Gokhale; Heena Hotchandani; Al Maseera Jahangir; Lavanya Keny; Suraksha Kotte; Vaishnave Mahesh; Indhuja Nandakumar; Avanee Patil; Rinitha Rajith; Theertha Satish (wk); Khushi Sharma; Mehak Thakur	Sindhu Sriharsha (c); Anika Kolan (vc, wk); Jivana Aras; Gargi Bhogle; Aditiba Chudasama; Disha Dhingra; Pooja Ganesh (wk); Saanvi Immadi; Geetika Kodali; Pooja Shah; Ritu Singh; Sai Tanmayi Eyyunni; Suhani Thadani; Isani Vaghela; Jessica Willathgamuwa	Selina Solman (c); Rachel Andrew; Maiyllise Carlot (wk); Alvina Chilia; Gillian Chilia (wk); Leimauri Chilia; Lizzing Enoch; Natalia Kakor; Valenta Langiatu; Vicky Mansale; Nasimana Navaika; Rayline Ova; Susan Stephen; Mahina Tarimiala (wk); Vanessa Vira	Mary-Anne Musonda (c); Francisca Chipare; Chiedza Dhururu (wk); Lindokuhle Mabhero; Precious Marange; Sharne Mayers; Audrey Mazvishaya; Chipo Mugeri-Tiripano; Pellagia Mujaji; Modester Mupachikwa (wk); Kelis Ndhlovu; Ashley Ndiraya; Josephine Nkomo; Nomvelo Sibanda; Loreen Tshuma

== Warm-up matches ==
Ahead of the tournament, each of the ten participating sides played two official warm-up games against other teams in the tournament.

Warm-up matches

21 April 2024
10:00
Scorecard

Thailand; 106/7 (20 overs)	v	United Arab Emirates; 107/2 (14.3 overs)
Naruemol Chaiwai 39 (48); Heena Hotchandani 2/16 (4 overs)		Esha Oza 61* (42); Thipatcha Putthawong 1/10 (3 overs)

United Arab Emirates won by 8 wickets
Tolerance Oval, Abu Dhabi
Umpires: Sarah Dambanevana (Zim) and Gazi Sohel (Ban)
Player of the match: Esha Oza (UAE)

- Thailand won the toss and elected to bat.

21 April 2024
10:00
Scorecard

Ireland; 98 (17.5 overs)	v	Scotland; 100/2 (16.1 overs)
Laura Delany 27 (25); Priyanaz Chatterji 3/17 (3 overs)		Sarah Bryce 34* (25); Ava Canning 1/9 (3 overs)

Scotland won by 8 wickets
Mohan's Oval, Abu Dhabi
Umpires: Shaun Haig (NZ) and Lisa McCabe (Aus)
Player of the match: Sarah Bryce (Sco)

- Ireland won the toss and elected to bat.

21 April 2024
15:00
Scorecard

Sri Lanka; 182/4 (20 overs)	v	Netherlands; 120/9 (20 overs)
Vishmi Gunaratne 49* (31); Eva Lynch 2/32 (4 overs)		Babette de Leede 41 (33); Kavisha Dilhari 2/9 (3 overs)

Sri Lanka won by 63 runs
Tolerance Oval, Abu Dhabi
Umpires: Shivani Mishra (Qat) and Dedunu Silva (SL)
Player of the match: Kavisha Dilhari (SL)

- Sri Lanka won the toss and elected to bat.

21 April 2024
15:00
Scorecard

Uganda; 119/6 (20 overs)	v	Vanuatu; 84/4 (20 overs)
Rita Musamali 35* (30); Rachel Andrew 2/19 (4 overs)		Rachel Andrew 41 (50); Immaculate Nandera 1/6 (2 overs)

Uganda won by 35 runs
Mohan's Oval, Abu Dhabi
Umpires: Shaun Haig (NZ) and Narayanan Janani (Ind)

- Uganda won the toss and elected to bat.

21 April 2024
19:00 (N)
Scorecard

United States; 124/4 (20 overs)	v	Zimbabwe; 125/4 (19 overs)
Anika Kolan 37 (39); Lindokuhle Mabhero 2/22 (4 overs)		Josephine Nkomo 38 (38); Ritu Singh 1/12 (3 overs)

Zimbabwe won by 6 wickets
Tolerance Oval, Abu Dhabi
Umpires: Kerrin Klaaste (SA) and Shivani Mishra (Qat)
Player of the match: Lindokuhle Mabhero (Zim)

- Zimbabwe won the toss and elected to field.

23 April 2024
10:00
Scorecard

Scotland; 197/4 (20 overs)	v	Zimbabwe; 165/0 (20 overs)
Saskia Horley 82* (49); Sharne Mayers 1/12 (1 over)		Sharne Mayers 102* (67)

Scotland won by 32 runs
Tolerance Oval, Abu Dhabi
Umpires: Shaun Haig (NZ) and Kerrin Klaaste (SA)
Player of the match: Saskia Horley (Sco)

- Scotland won the toss and elected to bat.

23 April 2024
10:00
Scorecard

Netherlands; 115/7 (20 overs)	v	Thailand; 115 (20 overs)
Babette de Leede 30 (25); Suleeporn Laomi 3/14 (4 overs)		Nannapat Koncharoenkai 36 (41); Merel Dekeling 2/16 (3 overs)

Match tied
(Netherlands won the Super Over)
Mohan's Oval, Abu Dhabi
Umpires: Sarah Dambanevana (Zim) and Gazi Sohel (Ban)
Player of the match: Heather Siegers (Ned)

- Thailand won the toss and elected to field.
- Super Over: Thailand 9/0, Netherlands 10/0.

23 April 2024
15:00
Scorecard

Vanuatu; 58 (17 overs)	v	Sri Lanka; 59/1 (8.2 overs)
Valenta Langiatu 12 (21); Shashini Gimhani 3/12 (4 overs)		Hasini Perera 27* (28); Rachel Andrew 1/7 (2 overs)

Sri Lanka won by 9 wickets
Tolerance Oval, Abu Dhabi
Umpires: Narayanan Janani (Ind) and Lisa McCabe (Aus)
Player of the match: Shashini Gimhani (SL)

- Vanuatu won the toss and elected to bat.

23 April 2024
15:00
Scorecard

United States; 119/9 (20 overs)	v	Ireland; 120/6 (15.2 overs)
Disha Dhingra 17 (17); Eimear Richardson 3/13 (4 overs)		Amy Hunter 34 (26); Geetika Kodali 2/25 (4 overs)

Ireland won by 4 wickets
Mohan's Oval, Abu Dhabi
Umpires: Dedunu Silva (SL) and Gazi Sohel (Ban)
Player of the match: Eimear Richardson (Ire)

- Ireland won the toss and elected to field.

23 April 2024
19:00 (N)
Scorecard

Uganda; 69/9 (20 overs)	v	United Arab Emirates; 71/1 (13.3 overs)
Prosscovia Alako 15 (35); Kavisha Egodage 2/6 (2 overs)		Khushi Sharma 37* (37); Sarah Akiteng 1/23 (3.3 overs)

United Arab Emirates won by 9 wickets
Tolerance Oval, Abu Dhabi
Umpires: Lisa McCabe (Aus) and Shivani Mishra (Qat)
Player of the match: Khushi Sharma (UAE)

- Uganda won the toss and elected to bat.

== Group stage ==
=== Group A ===
==== Points table ====
Pos	Team	Pld	W	L	T	NR	Pts	NRR	Qualification
1	Sri Lanka	4	4	0	0	0	8	2.778	Advanced to the playoffs
2	Scotland	4	3	1	0	0	6	1.473	Advanced to the playoffs
3	Thailand	4	2	2	0	0	4	0.161	
4	Uganda	4	1	3	0	0	2	−2.856	
5	United States	4	0	4	0	0	0	−1.813	

Source: ESPNcricinfo

==== Fixtures ====
25 April 2024
15:00 (D/N)
Scorecard

Sri Lanka; 122/5 (20 overs)	v	Thailand; 55 (16.2 overs)
Nilakshi de Silva 29* (20); Chanida Sutthiruang 1/15 (3 overs)		Nannapat Koncharoenkai 18 (27); Inoshi Priyadharshani 3/14 (4 overs)

Sri Lanka won by 67 runs
Tolerance Oval, Abu Dhabi
Umpires: Sarah Dambanevana (Zim) and Narayanan Janani (Ind)
Player of the match: Inoshi Priyadharshani (SL)

- Sri Lanka won the toss and elected to bat.

25 April 2024
19:30 (N)
Scorecard

Scotland; 161/3 (20 overs)	v	Uganda; 52 (12.2 overs)
Saskia Horley 61* (52); Immaculate Nakisuuyi 1/29 (4 overs)		Phiona Kulume 16* (16); Rachel Slater 5/17 (4 overs)

Scotland won by 109 runs
Tolerance Oval, Abu Dhabi
Umpires: Shivani Mishra (Qat) and Gazi Sohel (Ban)
Player of the match: Rachel Slater (Sco)

- Uganda won the toss and elected to field.
- Rachel Slater (Sco) took her first five-wicket haul in T20Is.

27 April 2024
15:00 (D/N)
Scorecard

United States; 110/5 (20 overs)	v	Uganda; 111/2 (18.2 overs)
Sindhu Sriharsha 26 (28); Sarah Akiteng 1/18 (4 overs)		Immaculate Nakisuuyi 71* (64); Geetika Kodali 1/9 (3.2 overs)

Uganda won by 8 wickets
Sheikh Zayed Cricket Stadium, Abu Dhabi
Umpires: Sarah Dambanevana (Zim) and Gazi Sohel (Ban)
Player of the match: Immaculate Nakisuuyi (Uga)

- United States won the toss and elected to bat.

27 April 2024
19:30 (N)
Scorecard

Scotland; 94 (18.1 overs)	v	Sri Lanka; 95/0 (10.1 overs)
Lorna Jack 24 (28); Kavisha Dilhari 4/13 (3.1 overs)		Chamari Athapaththu 59* (35)

Sri Lanka won by 10 wickets
Sheikh Zayed Cricket Stadium, Abu Dhabi
Umpires: Narayanan Janani (Ind) and Sarah Dambanevana (Zim)
Player of the match: Kavisha Dilhari (SL)

- Sri Lanka won the toss and elected to field.

29 April 2024
15:00 (D/N)
Scorecard

Scotland; 149/6 (20 overs)	v	United States; 105/8 (20 overs)
Kathryn Bryce 57* (51); Isani Vaghela 2/17 (4 overs)		Isani Vaghela 30 (26); Kathryn Bryce 4/17 (4 overs)

Scotland won by 44 runs
Tolerance Oval, Abu Dhabi
Umpires: Sarah Dambanevana (Zim) and Shaun Haig (NZ)
Player of the match: Kathryn Bryce (Sco)

- United States won the toss and elected to field.
- Saanvi Immadi (USA) made her T20I debut.
- Abtaha Maqsood became the first cricketer for Scotland to take 50 wickets in women's T20Is.

29 April 2024
19:30 (N)
Scorecard

Uganda; 62 (17.4 overs)	v	Thailand; 64/1 (11.3 overs)
Rita Musamali 24 (22); Nattaya Boochatham 2/8 (2.4 overs)		Natthakan Chantham 34* (43); Sarah Akiteng 1/18 (3 overs)

Thailand won by 9 wickets
Tolerance Oval, Abu Dhabi
Umpires: Narayanan Janani (Ind) and Dedunu Silva (SL)
Player of the match: Natthakan Chantham (Tha)

- Thailand won the toss and elected to field.

1 May 2024
15:00 (D/N)
Scorecard

Sri Lanka; 154/4 (20 overs)	v	Uganda; 87 (19.2 overs)
Vishmi Gunaratne 73* (64); Janet Mbabazi 1/19 (2 overs)		Prosscovia Alako 36 (32); Inoka Ranaweera 2/10 (3 overs)

Sri Lanka won by 67 runs
Sheikh Zayed Cricket Stadium, Abu Dhabi
Umpires: Sarah Dambanevana (Zim) and Shaun Haig (NZ)
Player of the match: Vishmi Gunaratne (SL)

- Sri Lanka won the toss and elected to bat.
- Shashini Gimhani (SL) made her T20I debut.

1 May 2024
19:30 (N)
Scorecard

United States; 54 (17.5 overs)	v	Thailand; 56/1 (9.2 overs)
Isani Vaghela 15* (22); Thipatcha Putthawong 4/12 (4 overs)		Nannapat Koncharoenkai 31* (25); Geetika Kodali 1/13 (2 overs)

Thailand won by 9 wickets
Sheikh Zayed Cricket Stadium, Abu Dhabi
Umpires: Kerrin Klaaste (SA) and Dedunu Silva (SL)
Player of the match: Thipatcha Putthawong (Tha)

- Thailand won the toss and elected to field.
- Pooja Ganesh (USA) made her T20I debut.

3 May 2024
15:00 (D/N)
Scorecard

Thailand; 99/5 (20 overs)	v	Scotland; 100/4 (17.5 overs)
Naruemol Chaiwai 36* (47); Hannah Rainey 2/12 (3 overs)		Kathryn Bryce 63* (58); Chanida Sutthiruang 2/18 (4 overs)

Scotland won by 6 wickets
Tolerance Oval, Abu Dhabi
Umpires: Shivani Mishra (Qat) and Dedunu Silva (SL)
Player of the match: Kathryn Bryce (Sco)

- Thailand won the toss and elected to bat.

3 May 2024
19:30 (N)
Scorecard

Sri Lanka; 123/4 (20 overs)	v	United States; 105/6 (20 overs)
Hansima Karunaratne 25* (27); Saanvi Immadi 1/14 (4 overs)		Disha Dhingra 28 (29); Chamari Athapaththu 3/14 (4 overs)

Sri Lanka won by 18 runs
Tolerance Oval, Abu Dhabi
Umpires: Narayanan Janani (Ind) and Kerrin Klaaste (SA)
Player of the match: Chamari Athapaththu (SL)

- Sri Lanka won the toss and elected to bat.
- Pooja Shah (USA) made her T20I debut.

=== Group B ===
==== Points table ====
Pos	Team	Pld	W	L	T	NR	Pts	NRR	Qualification
1	Ireland	4	4	0	0	0	8	2.462	Advance to the playoffs
2	United Arab Emirates (H)	4	2	2	0	0	4	0.976	Advance to the playoffs
3	Netherlands	4	2	2	0	0	4	0.111	
4	Zimbabwe	4	1	3	0	0	2	−0.844	
5	Vanuatu	4	1	3	0	0	2	−2.537	

Source: ESPNcricinfo
(H) Host

==== Fixtures ====
25 April 2024
15:00 (D/N)
Scorecard

United Arab Emirates; 105/9 (20 overs)	v	Ireland; 106/4 (16.1 overs)
Khushi Sharma 24 (28); Arlene Kelly 2/12 (3 overs)		Gaby Lewis 27 (22); Esha Oza 3/13 (4 overs)

Ireland won by 6 wickets
Sheikh Zayed Cricket Stadium, Abu Dhabi
Umpires: Kerrin Klaaste (SA) and Lisa McCabe (Aus)
Player of the match: Eimear Richardson (Ire)

- Ireland won the toss and elected to field.

25 April 2024
19:30 (N)
Scorecard

Zimbabwe; 61 (13.3 overs)	v	Vanuatu; 62/4 (16.3 overs)
Sharne Mayers 16 (12); Nasimana Navaika 4/13 (4 overs)		Nasimana Navaika 21 (36); Audrey Mazvishaya 2/7 (4 overs)

Vanuatu won by 6 wickets
Sheikh Zayed Cricket Stadium, Abu Dhabi
Umpires: Shaun Haig (NZ) and Dedunu Silva (SL)
Player of the match: Nasimana Navaika (Van)

- Zimbabwe won the toss and elected to bat.

27 April 2024
15:00 (D/N)
Scorecard

Netherlands; 154/6 (20 overs)	v	Vanuatu; 54 (19.5 overs)
Sterre Kalis 70 (51); Nasimana Navaika 2/29 (4 overs)		Gillian Chilia 11* (20); Caroline de Lange 2/8 (4 overs)

Netherlands won by 100 runs
Tolerance Oval, Abu Dhabi
Umpires: Shaun Haig (NZ) and Lisa McCabe (Aus)
Player of the match: Sterre Kalis (Ned)

- Netherlands won the toss and elected to bat.
- Sterre Kalis (Ned) scored her 1,000th run in T20Is.

27 April 2024
19:30 (N)
Scorecard

United Arab Emirates; 105/9 (20 overs)	v	Zimbabwe; 106/2 (15.3 overs)
Heena Hotchandani 32 (33); Josephine Nkomo 4/11 (4 overs)		Chipo Mugeri-Tiripano 36* (26); Suraksha Kotte 1/13 (2 overs)

Zimbabwe won by 8 wickets
Tolerance Oval, Abu Dhabi
Umpires: Kerrin Klaaste (SA) and Dedunu Silva (SL)
Player of the match: Josephine Nkomo (Zim)

- United Arab Emirates won the toss and elected to bat.

29 April 2024
15:00 (D/N)
Scorecard

Ireland; 176/3 (20 overs)	v	Zimbabwe; 120/8 (20 overs)
Amy Hunter 71 (50); Kelis Ndlovu 1/32 (4 overs)		Mary-Anne Musonda 48 (39); Ava Canning 2/13 (3 overs)

Ireland won by 56 runs
Sheikh Zayed Cricket Stadium, Abu Dhabi
Umpires: Kerrin Klaaste (SA) and Lisa McCabe (Aus)
Player of the match: Amy Hunter (Ire)

- Zimbabwe won the toss and elected to field.

29 April 2024
19:30 (N)
Scorecard

Netherlands; 101/9 (20 overs)	v	United Arab Emirates; 104/0 (11.5 overs)
Robine Rijke 44 (36); Samaira Dharnidharka 3/11 (4 overs)		Esha Oza 66* (39)

United Arab Emirates won by 10 wickets
Sheikh Zayed Cricket Stadium, Abu Dhabi
Umpires: Shivani Mishra (Qat) and Gazi Sohel (Ban)
Player of the match: Esha Oza (UAE)

- Netherlands won the toss and elected to bat.

1 May 2024
15:00 (D/N)
Scorecard

Netherlands; 135/6 (20 overs)	v	Zimbabwe; 121/4 (20 overs)
Robine Rijke 39* (25); Francisca Chipare 2/27 (4 overs)		Josephine Nkomo 39* (41); Frederique Overdijk 1/20 (3 overs)

Netherlands won by 14 runs
Tolerance Oval, Abu Dhabi
Umpires: Narayanan Janani (Ind) and Lisa McCabe (Aus)
Player of the match: Babette de Leede (Ned)

- Netherlands won the toss and elected to bat.
- Iris Zwilling became the first cricketer for Netherlands to take 50 wickets in women's T20Is.

1 May 2024
19:30 (N)
Scorecard

Vanuatu; 88/9 (20 overs)	v	Ireland; 89/1 (12.3 overs)
Valenta Langiatu 27 (31); Eimear Richardson 3/8 (4 overs)		Gaby Lewis 45 (36); Nasimana Navaika 1/12 (3 overs)

Ireland won by 9 wickets
Tolerance Oval, Abu Dhabi
Umpires: Shivani Mishra (Qat) and Gazi Sohel (Ban)
Player of the match: Eimear Richardson (Ire)

- Ireland won the toss and elected to field.
- Gaby Lewis became the first cricketer for Ireland to score 2,000 runs in women's T20Is.

3 May 2024
15:00 (D/N)
Scorecard

United Arab Emirates; 133/7 (20 overs)	v	Vanuatu; 63/8 (20 overs)
Theertha Satish 44 (42); Nasimana Navaika 3/21 (4 overs)		Gillian Chilia 21* (29); Samaira Dharnidharka 4/12 (4 overs)

United Arab Emirates won by 70 runs
Sheikh Zayed Cricket Stadium, Abu Dhabi
Umpires: Sarah Dambanevana (Zim) and Shaun Haig (NZ)
Player of the match: Samaira Dharnidharka (UAE)

- Vanuatu won the toss and elected to field.

3 May 2024
19:30 (N)
Scorecard

Ireland; 144/4 (20 overs)	v	Netherlands; 90 (17.3 overs)
Laura Delany 70* (45); Iris Zwilling 2/13 (4 overs)		Babette de Leede 20 (21); Laura Delany 3/6 (2 overs)

Ireland won by 54 runs
Sheikh Zayed Cricket Stadium, Abu Dhabi
Umpires: Lisa McCabe (Aus) and Gazi Sohel (Ban)
Player of the match: Laura Delany (Ire)

- Ireland won the toss and elected to bat.

== Knockout stage ==
=== Bracket ===
Semi-finals
A1	Sri Lanka	149/6 (20 overs)
B2	United Arab Emirates	134/7 (20 overs)
B1	Ireland	110/9 (20 overs)
A2	Scotland	112/2 (16.2 overs)

Final
SFW1	Sri Lanka	169/5 (20 overs)
SFW2	Scotland	101/7 (20 overs)

=== Semi-finals ===
5 May 2024
15:00 (D/N)
Scorecard

Ireland; 110/9 (20 overs)	v	Scotland; 112/2 (16.2 overs)
Leah Paul 45 (51); Kathryn Bryce 4/8 (4 overs)		Megan McColl 50 (47); Arlene Kelly 2/28 (4 overs)

Scotland won by 8 wickets
Sheikh Zayed Cricket Stadium, Abu Dhabi
Umpires: Shaun Haig (NZ) and Narayanan Janani (Ind)
Player of the match: Kathryn Bryce (Sco)

- Ireland won the toss and elected to bat.

5 May 2024
19:30 (N)
Scorecard

Sri Lanka; 149/6 (20 overs)	v	United Arab Emirates; 134/7 (20 overs)
Vishmi Gunaratne 45 (44); Esha Oza 2/27 (3 overs)		Esha Oza 66 (44); Chamari Athapaththu 2/28 (4 overs)

Sri Lanka won by 15 runs
Sheikh Zayed Cricket Stadium, Abu Dhabi
Umpires: Kerrin Klaaste (SA) and Gazi Sohel (Ban)
Player of the match: Esha Oza (UAE)

- United Arab Emirates won the toss and elected to field.

=== Final ===
7 May 2024
19:30 (N)
Scorecard

Sri Lanka; 169/5 (20 overs)	v	Scotland; 101/7 (20 overs)
Chamari Athapaththu 102 (63); Rachel Slater 2/35 (4 overs)		Priyanaz Chatterji 30 (34); Udeshika Prabodhani 3/13 (4 overs)

Sri Lanka won by 68 runs
Sheikh Zayed Cricket Stadium, Abu Dhabi
Umpires: Shaun Haig (NZ) and Kerrin Klaaste (SA)
Player of the match: Chamari Athapaththu (SL)

- Scotland won the toss and elected to field.

== Final standings ==
Position	Team
1st	Sri Lanka
2nd	Scotland
3rd	Ireland
4th	United Arab Emirates
5th	Thailand
6th	Netherlands
7th	Zimbabwe
8th	Vanuatu
9th	Uganda
10th	United States

Qualified for the 2024 ICC Women's T20 World Cup.
