= United Arab Emirates women's cricket team in Zimbabwe in 2025–26 =

International cricket tour

| | Zimbabwe | United Arab Emirates |
- Dates: 26 September – 6 October 2025
| Captains | Chipo Mugeri-Tiripano | Esha Oza |

One Day International series
- Results: 4-match series drawn 2–2
| Most runs | Loryn Phiri (134) | Esha Oza (120) |
| Most wickets | Loreen Tshuma (8) | Esha Oza (10) |
- Player of the series: Esha Oza (UAE)

Twenty20 International series
- Results: United Arab Emirates won the 2-match series 2–0
| Most runs | Chiedza Dhururu (69) | Esha Oza (101) |
| Most wickets | Lindokuhle Mabhero (4) | Heena Hotchandani (4) |
- Player of the series: Esha Oza (UAE)

The United Arab Emirates women's cricket team toured Zimbabwe in September and October 2025 to play the Zimbabwe women's cricket team. The tour consisted of four One Day International (ODI) and two Twenty20 International (T20I) matches. In September 2025, the Zimbabwe Cricket (ZC) confirmed the fixtures for the tour. All the matches were played at the Queens Sports Club in Bulawayo. It was the first ODI series for the UAE women's team since they were granted ODI status earlier in the year.

== Squads ==
| Zimbabwe | United Arab Emirates |
|---|---|
| Chipo Mugeri-Tiripano (c); Beloved Biza; Christabel Chatonzwa; Kudzai Chigora; Francisca Chipare; Chiedza Dhururu (wk); Nyasha Gwanzura; Lindokuhle Mabhero; Tendai Makusha; Audrey Mazvishaya; Modester Mupachikwa (wk); Josephine Nkomo; Kelis Ndhlovu; Runyararo Pasipanodya; Loryn Phiri; Nomvelo Sibanda; Loreen Tshuma; Adel Zimunu | Esha Oza (c); Michelle Botha; Samaira Dharnidharka; Udeni Dona; Siya Gokhale; Heena Hotchandani; Al Maseera Jahangir; Lavanya Keny; Suraksha Kotte; Vaishnave Mahesh; Indhuja Nandakumar; Rinitha Rajith; Theertha Satish (wk); Athige Silva; Mehak Thakur; Emily Thomas; Katie Thompson |

== Tour match ==
24 September 2025
09:15
Scorecard

| United Arab Emirates; 230 (44.5 overs) | v | Zimbabwe A 138 (35.3 overs) |
| Theertha Satish 57 (58); Loryn Phiri 3/42 (10 overs) | | Loryn Phiri 38 (78); Samaira Dharnidharka 4/30 (6 overs) |

United Arab Emirates won by 92 runs
Queens Sports Club, Bulawayo
Umpires: Nkosenhle Ndiweni (Zim) and Given Sithole (Zim)

- Zimbabwe A won the toss and elected to field.

== ODI series ==
=== 1st ODI ===
26 September 2025
09:15
Scorecard

| United Arab Emirates; 222/5 (50 overs) | v | Zimbabwe; 186 (46.3 overs) |
| Rinitha Rajith 59* (59); Loreen Tshuma 2/18 (6 overs) | | Kelis Ndhlovu 38 (55); Samaira Dharnidharka 3/29 (7.3 overs) |

United Arab Emirates won by 36 runs
Queens Sports Club, Bulawayo
Umpires: Christopher Phiri (Zim) and Collin Tlou (Zim)
Player of the match: Esha Oza (UAE)

- Zimbabwe won the toss and elected to field.
- Michelle Botha, Samaira Dharnidharka, Udeni Dona, Heena Hotchandani, Lavanya Keny, Vaishnave Mahesh, Esha Oza, Rinitha Rajith, Theertha Satish, Athige Silva and Katie Thompson (UAE) all made their ODI debuts.

=== 2nd ODI ===
28 September 2025
09:15
Scorecard

| United Arab Emirates; 160 (40.5 overs) | v | Zimbabwe; 161/4 (40.2 overs) |
| Heena Hotchandani 34 (70); Loreen Tshuma 3/36 (9 overs) | | Kelis Ndhlovu 61 (99); Esha Oza 3/28 (9 overs) |

Zimbabwe won by 6 wickets
Queens Sports Club, Bulawayo
Umpires: Nkosehle Ndiweni (Zim) and Christopher Phiri (Zim)
Player of the match: Loreen Tshuma (Zim)

- Zimbabwe won the toss and elected to field.

=== 3rd ODI ===
30 September 2025
09:15
Scorecard

| Zimbabwe; 203/7 (50 overs) | v | United Arab Emirates; 168/8 (50 overs) |
| Loryn Phiri 69 (94); Esha Oza 3/33 (10 overs) | | Heena Hotchandani 40 (91); Lindokuhle Mabhero 3/21 (10 overs) |

Zimbabwe won by 35 runs
Queens Sports Club, Bulawayo
Umpires: Nkosehle Ndiweni (Zim) and Christopher Phiri (Zim)
Player of the match: Lindokuhle Mabhero (Zim)

- United Arab Emirates won the toss and elected to field.
- Al Maseera Jahangir and Indhuja Nandakumar (UAE) both made their ODI debuts.

=== 4th ODI ===
2 October 2025
09:15
Scorecard

| United Arab Emirates; 274/7 (50 overs) | v | Zimbabwe; 229/7 (50 overs) |
| Esha Oza 82 (95); Loreen Tshuma 2/42 (8 overs) | | Josephine Nkomo 76 (98); Suraksha Kotte 2/35 (10 overs) |

United Arab Emirates won by 45 runs
Queens Sports Club, Bulawayo
Umpires: Nkosehle Ndiweni (Zim) and Christopher Phiri (Zim)
Player of the match: Esha Oza (UAE)

- Zimbabwe won the toss and elected to field.
- Siya Gokhale and Suraksha Kotte (UAE) both made their ODI debuts.

== T20I series ==
=== 1st T20I ===
5 October 2025
13:30
Scorecard

| United Arab Emirates; 183/3 (20 overs) | v | Zimbabwe; 148/6 (20 overs) |
| Esha Oza 97 (55); Lindokuhle Mabhero 2/29 (4 overs) | | Chiedza Dhururu 67* (58); Samaira Dharnidharka 3/19 (4 overs) |

United Arab Emirates won by 35 runs
Queens Sports Club, Bulawayo
Umpires: Christopher Phiri (Zim) and Collin Tlou (Zim)
Player of the match: Esha Oza (UAE)

- United Arab Emirates won the toss and elected to bat.
- This was the first women's T20I to be played at this venue.
- Samaira Dharnidharka (UAE) took her first hat-trick in T20Is.

=== 2nd T20I ===
6 October 2025
13:30
Scorecard

| United Arab Emirates; 130/7 (20 overs) | v | Zimbabwe; 122/8 (20 overs) |
| Theertha Satish 44 (38); Lindokuhle Mabhero 2/15 (4 overs) | | Loryn Phiri 31 (27); Heena Hotchandani 3/17 (4 overs) |

United Arab Emirates won by 8 runs
Queens Sports Club, Bulawayo
Umpires: Nkosehle Ndiweni (Zim) and Collin Tlou (Zim)
Player of the match: Heena Hotchandani (UAE)

- United Arab Emirates won the toss and elected to bat.
