= United Arab Emirates women's cricket team in Papua New Guinea in 2025–26 =

International cricket tour

	Papua New Guinea	United Arab Emirates
- Dates: 13 – 19 October 2025
Captains	Brenda Tau	Esha Oza

One Day International series
- Results: 4-match series drawn 2–2
Most runs	Lakshmi Rajadurai (97)	Theertha Satish (101)
Most wickets	Pauke Siaka (9)	Michelle Botha (9)

The United Arab Emirates women's cricket team toured Papua New Guinea in October 2025 to play the Papua New Guinea women's cricket team. The tour consisted of four One Day International (ODI) matches. All the matches were played at the Amini Park in Port Moresby. It was the first ever ODI bilateral series between the two sides, since the UAE were granted ODI status earlier in the year.

== Squads ==
Papua New Guinea	United Arab Emirates
Brenda Tau (c, wk); Hollan Doriga; Dika Lohia; Konio Oala; Erani Pokana; Miria Raio; Lakshmi Rajadurai; Pauke Siaka; Hane Tau; Henao Thomas; Geua Tom; Mairi Tom; Isabel Toua; Naoani Vare	Esha Oza (c); Michelle Botha; Samaira Dharnidharka; Udeni Dona; Siya Gokhale; Al Maseera Jahangir; Lavanya Keny; Suraksha Kotte; Vaishnave Mahesh; Indhuja Nandakumar; Rinitha Rajith; Theertha Satish (wk); Athige Silva; Mehak Thakur; Emily Thomas; Katie Thompson

== ODI series ==
=== 1st ODI ===
13 October 2025
09:30
Scorecard

Papua New Guinea; 93 (33.2 overs)	v	United Arab Emirates; 97/5 (33.1 overs)
Lakshmi Rajadurai 31 (90); Suraksha Kotte 5/20 (10 overs)		Theertha Satish 46* (87); Pauke Siaka 3/8 (6 overs)

United Arab Emirates won by 5 wickets
Amini Park, Port Moresby
Umpires: Koita Atai (PNG) and Alu Kapa (PNG)
Player of the match: Suraksha Kotte (UAE)

- United Arab Emirates won the toss and elected to field.
- Hollan Doriga, Erani Pokana and Mairi Tom (PNG) all made their ODI debuts.
- This was the first women's ODI to be played at this venue.
- Suraksha Kotte became the first cricketer for United Arab Emirates to take a five-wicket haul in women's ODIs.

=== 2nd ODI ===
15 October 2025
09:30
Scorecard

United Arab Emirates; 143 (45.4 overs)	v	Papua New Guinea; 146/7 (42.5 overs)
Rinitha Rajith 32 (56); Pauke Siaka 4/25 (9.4 overs)		Lakshmi Rajadurai 45 (97); Michelle Botha 3/30 (7 overs)

Papua New Guinea won by 3 wickets
Amini Park, Port Moresby
Umpires: Alu Kapa (PNG) and Lakani Oala (PNG)
Player of the match: Henao Thomas (PNG)

- Papua New Guinea won the toss and elected to field.
- Konio Oala, Miria Raio and Hane Tau (PNG) all made their ODI debuts.

=== 3rd ODI ===
17 October 2025
09:30
Scorecard

United Arab Emirates; 193/7 (50 overs)	v	Papua New Guinea; 33 (15.4 overs)
Udeni Dona 56 (95); Geua Tom 1/18 (4 overs)		Henao Thomas 11 (22); Samaira Dharnidharka 4/19 (8 overs)

United Arab Emirates won by 160 runs
Amini Park, Port Moresby
Umpires: Koita Atai (PNG) and Lakani Oala (PNG)
Player of the match: Samaira Dharnidharka (UAE)

- United Arab Emirates won the toss and elected to bat.

=== 4th ODI ===
19 October 2025
09:30
Scorecard

Papua New Guinea; 210/9 (50 overs)	v	United Arab Emirates; 132 (42.4 overs)
Pauke Siaka 60 (63); Indhuja Nandakumar 4/50 (9 overs)		Samaira Dharnidharka 45 (68); Dika Lohia 2/12 (4 overs)

Papua New Guinea won by 78 runs
Amini Park, Port Moresby
Umpires: Alu Kapa (PNG) and Lakani Oala (PNG)
Player of the match: Pauke Siaka (PNG)

- Papua New Guinea won the toss and elected to bat.
