= Hong Kong women's cricket team in the United Arab Emirates in 2021–22 =

International cricket tour

Hong Kong women's cricket team in the UAE in 2021–22
| | United Arab Emirates | Hong Kong |
- Dates: 27 – 30 April 2022
| Captains | Chaya Mughal | Kary Chan |

Twenty20 International series
- Results: United Arab Emirates won the 4-match series 4–0
| Most runs | Kavisha Egodage (143) | Kary Chan (92) |
| Most wickets | Chamani Seneviratna (6) | Mariko Hill (6) |

The Hong Kong women's cricket team toured the United Arab Emirates in April 2022 to play a four-match bilateral Women's Twenty20 International (WT20I) series. The venue for the series was the Malek Cricket Ground in Ajman. The UAE won all of the matches, to win the series 4–0, taking their unbeaten run in WT20I cricket to fourteen matches.

== Squads ==
| United Arab Emirates | Hong Kong |
|---|---|
| Chaya Mughal (c); Samaira Dharnidharka; Kavisha Egodage; Mahika Gaur; Siya Gokhale; Priyanjali Jain (wk); Lavanya Keny; Suraksha Kotte; Vaishnave Mahesh; Indhuja Nandakumar; Esha Oza; Theertha Satish (wk); Chamani Seneviratne; Khushi Sharma | Kary Chan (c); Yasmin Daswani (vc, wk); Maryam Bibi; Betty Chan; Mariko Hill; Cindy Ho; Emma Lai; Marina Lamplough; Heiley Lui; Natasha Miles; Iqra Sahar; Shanzeen Shahzad (wk); Alison Siu; Ruchitha Venkatesh |

Shubha Venkataraman and Rinitha Rajith were both named as reserves in the UAE's squad.

== WT20I series ==
=== 1st WT20I ===
27 April 2022
19:00 (D/N)
Scorecard

| Hong Kong; 118/6 (20 overs) | v | United Arab Emirates; 120/3 (15.3 overs) |
| Kary Chan 45 (53); Chamani Seneviratne 4/24 (4 overs) | | Kavisha Egodage 50* (43); Maryam Bibi 1/11 (1 over) |

United Arab Emirates won by 7 wickets
Malek Cricket Ground, Ajman
Umpires: Shameem Abdul Basheer (UAE) and Aasif Iqbal (UAE)
Player of the match: Chamani Seneviratne (UAE)

- Hong Kong won the toss and elected to bat.

=== 2nd WT20I ===
28 April 2022
19:00 (D/N)
Scorecard

| United Arab Emirates; 131/5 (20 overs) | v | Hong Kong; 103/8 (20 overs) |
| Esha Oza 53 (51); Mariko Hill 3/14 (2 overs) | | Kary Chan 39 (45); Khushi Sharma 2/10 (2 overs) |

United Arab Emirates won by 28 runs
Malek Cricket Ground, Ajman
Umpires: Jeetendra Gupte (UAE) and Aasif Iqbal (UAE)
Player of the match: Esha Oza (UAE)

- Hong Kong won the toss and elected to field.

=== 3rd WT20I ===
29 April 2022
19:00 (D/N)
Scorecard

| United Arab Emirates; 121/3 (20 overs) | v | Hong Kong; 95/9 (20 overs) |
| Kavisha Egodage 61* (58); Mariko Hill 2/19 (4 overs) | | Yasmin Daswani 34* (20); Chamani Seneviratne 2/9 (3 overs) |

United Arab Emirates won by 26 runs
Malek Cricket Ground, Ajman
Umpires: Shameem Abdul Basheer (UAE) and Raziq Khan (UAE)
Player of the match: Kavisha Egodage (UAE)

- United Arab Emirates won the toss and elected to bat.
- Cindy Ho (HK) made her WT20I debut.

=== 4th WT20I ===
30 April 2022
09:00
Scorecard

| Hong Kong; 62 (18.4 overs) | v | United Arab Emirates; 64/1 (8.3 overs) |
| Mariko Hill 15 (14); Siya Gokhale 3/14 (4 overs) | | Esha Oza 28* (24); Mariko Hill 1/6 (2 overs) |

United Arab Emirates won by 9 wickets
Malek Cricket Ground, Ajman
Umpires: Jeetendra Gupte (UAE) and Raziq Khan (UAE)
Player of the match: Siya Gokhale (UAE)

- Hong Kong won the toss and elected to bat.
