= 2023 Women's T20 World Cup Asia Qualifier =

Qualifying tournament for 2024 Women's T20 World Cup

2023 ICC Women's T20 World Cup Asia Qualifier
- Dates: 31 August – 9 September 2023
- Administrator: Asian Cricket Council
- Cricket format: Twenty20 International
- Tournament format(s): Group round-robin and knockout
- Host: Malaysia
- Champions: United Arab Emirates
- Runners-up: Thailand
- Participants: 11
- Matches: 28
- Player of the series: (United Arab Emirates) Esha Oza
- Most runs: (United Arab Emirates) Esha Oza (229)
- Most wickets: (Thailand) Nattaya Boochatham (18)

The 2023 ICC Women's T20 World Cup Asia Qualifier was a cricket tournament that formed part of the qualification process for the 2024 ICC Women's T20 World Cup. The Asia Qualifier was hosted by Malaysia in August and September 2023. The two teams to reach the final of the qualifier tournament progressed to the global qualifier.

Thailand and United Arab Emirates progressed to the global qualifier after winning their respective semi-finals. United Arab Emirates defeated Thailand in the final by 6 runs.

== Squads ==
Bahrain	Bhutan	China	Hong Kong	Kuwait	Malaysia
Deepika Rasangika (c); Sadamali Bhakshala; Gayani Fernando (wk); Tharanga Gajanayake; Ashwini Govinda (wk); Prajna Jagdeesha; Manal Malik; Swarna Nunna; Shashikala Prakash; Rasika Rodrigo; Asha Samildeen; Pavithra Shetty; Ishara Suhun; Abeera Waris	Dechen Wangmo (c); Kinley Bidha; Ngawang Choden (wk); Sonam Choden; Tshering Choden; Yeshey Choden; Karma Dema; Anjuli Ghalley; Anju Gurung; Chado Om; Sonam; Pema Yangchen (wk); Eva Yangzom; Tshering Zangmo	Han Lili (c); Yuanyuan Cai; Xiuli Jin; Zheng Lili; Mengting Liu; Zi Mei (wk); Xu Qian; Chen Xinyu; Jing Yang (wk); Wenjing Yin; Chen Yue; Rongyu Zhao; Caiyun Zhou; Mingyue Zhu	Kary Chan (c); Natasha Miles (vc); Maryam Bibi; Betty Chan; Shing Chan; Hiu Ying Cheung (wk); Yasmin Daswani (wk); Mariko Hill; Marina Lamplough; Iqra Sahar; Shanzeen Shahzad (wk); Alison Siu; Yee Shan To; Ruchitha Venkatesh	Amna Tariq (c); Priyada Murali (vc); Maryyam Ashraf; Angel Gabriella D'Costa; Suchitha Lita D'Sa (wk); Raelyn D'Souza; Siobhan Gomez; Mariamma Hyder; Iqra Ishaq (wk); Maria Jasvi; Zeefa Jilani; Khadija Khalil (wk); Glenda Menezes; Maryam Omar; Balasubramani Shanti	Winifred Duraisingam (c); Mas Elysa (vc); Musfirah Nur Ainaa; Nur Aishah; Nik Nur Atiela; Aisya Eleesa; Ainna Hamizah Hashim; Jamahidaya Intan; Mahirah Izzati Ismail; Wan Julia (wk); Aina Najwa (wk); Nur Arianna Natsya; Nur Dania Syuhada; Wan Nor Zulaika
Myanmar	Nepal	Qatar	Thailand	United Arab Emirates	
Zar Win (c, wk); Htet Aung; Thae Thae Aung (wk); Lin Htun; San Nyo Htwe; Zin Kyaw; Zon Lin; Aye Moe; Khin Myat; Pan Ei Phyu; Thae Thae Po (wk); May San; Theint Soe; Shwe Yee Win	Rubina Chhetry (c); Indu Barma; Apsari Begam; Ishwori Bist; Khushi Dangol; Kabita Joshi; Asmina Karmacharya; Samjhana Khadka; Kabita Kunwar; Sita Rana Magar; Puja Mahato; Rubi Poddar (wk); Bindu Rawal; Kajal Shrestha (wk)	Aysha (c); Hiral Agarwal; Shahreen Bahadur; Saachi Dhadwal; Tafaul El Nour; Rizpha Bano Emmanuel (wk); Khadija Imtiaz; Trupti Kale (wk); Aleena Khan; Angeline Mare; Sabeeja Panayan; Rochelle Quyn; Shrutiben Rana (wk); Sudha Thapa	Naruemol Chaiwai (c); Natthakan Chantam; Nattaya Boochatham; Nanthita Boonsukham; Kanyakorn Bunthansen; Sunida Chaturongrattana; Onnicha Kamchomphu; Rosenanee Kanoh; Suwanan Khiaoto (wk); Nannapat Koncharoenkai (wk); Phannita Maya; Thipatcha Putthawong; Chanida Sutthiruang; Sornnarin Tippoch	Chaya Mughal (c, wk); Esha Oza (vc, wk); Samaira Dharnidharka; Kavisha Egodage; Siya Gokhale; Al Maseera Jahangir; Lavanya Keny; Suraksha Kotte; Vaishnave Mahesh; Indhuja Nandakumar; Avanee Patil; Rinitha Rajith; Theertha Satish (wk); Khushi Sharma	

== Group stage ==
=== Group A ===
==== Points table ====
Pos	Team	Pld	W	L	NR	Pts	NRR	Qualification
1	United Arab Emirates	5	4	0	1	9	3.339	Advanced to the knockout stage
2	Nepal	5	4	0	1	9	2.184	Advanced to the knockout stage
3	Malaysia	5	2	2	1	5	0.647	
4	Bhutan	5	1	3	1	3	−1.306	
5	Bahrain	5	1	3	1	3	−2.773	
6	Qatar	5	0	4	1	1	−1.647	

Source: ESPNcricinfo

==== Fixtures ====
31 August 2023
09:30
Scorecard

Nepal; 84/6 (20 overs)	v	Malaysia; 79/9 (20 overs)
Sita Rana Magar 38* (54); Ainna Hamizah Hashim 2/14 (4 overs)		Winifred Duraisingam 28 (39); Kabita Joshi 2/5 (2 overs)

Nepal won by 5 runs
Bayuemas Oval, Pandamaran
Umpires: Tabarak Dar (HK) and Sarika Prasad (Sin)
Player of the match: Sita Rana Magar (Nep)

- Malaysia won the toss and elected to field.

31 August 2023
09:30
Scorecard

Qatar; 116/7 (20 overs)	v	Bahrain; 119/5 (18.2 overs)
Aysha 41 (32); Sadamali Arachchige 2/18 (4 overs)		Deepika Rasangika 74* (56); Hiral Agarwal 2/14 (2 overs)

Bahrain won by 5 wickets
UKM-YSD Cricket Oval, Bangi
Umpires: Vinay Kumar Jha (Nep) and Viswanadan Kalidas (Mas)
Player of the match: Deepika Rasangika (Bhr)

- Qatar won the toss and elected to bat.
- Sadamali Bhakshala, Ashwini Govinda, Manal Malik (Bhr) and Sudha Thapa (Qat) all made their T20I debuts.

31 August 2023
09:30
Scorecard

Bhutan; 32 (15.4 overs)	v	United Arab Emirates; 33/1 (3.4 overs)
Anju Gurung 10* (17); Vaishnave Mahesh 3/7 (3.4 overs)		Esha Oza 14* (9); Sonam 1/24 (1.4 overs)

United Arab Emirates won by 9 wickets
Selangor Turf Club, Seri Kembangan
Umpires: Dedunu Silva (SL) and Durga Subedi (Nep)
Player of the match: Vaishnave Mahesh (UAE)

- Bhutan won the toss and elected to bat.
- Kinley Bidha, Anjuli Ghalley and Chado Om (Bhu) all made their T20I debuts.

1 September 2023
13:30
Scorecard

Qatar; 64/9 (20 overs)	v	Bhutan; 65/2 (17.4 overs)
Sabeeja Panayan 9 (14); Dechen Wangmo 4/8 (4 overs)		Dechen Wangmo 29* (52); Saachi Dhadwal 1/10 (3.4 overs)

Bhutan won by 8 wickets
Bayuemas Oval, Pandamaran
Umpires: Tabarak Dar (HK) and Dedunu Silva (SL)
Player of the match: Dechen Wangmo (Bhu)

- Bhutan won the toss and elected to field.
- Tshering Choden (Bhu) made her T20I debut.

1 September 2023
13:30
Scorecard

Malaysia; 64/6 (16 overs)	v	United Arab Emirates; 67/3 (12.5 overs)
Aina Najwa 17* (14); Chaya Mughal 2/10 (4 overs)		Kavisha Egodage 19 (21); Nur Arianna Natsya 1/12 (3 overs)

United Arab Emirates won by 7 wickets
UKM-YSD Cricket Oval, Bangi
Umpires: Nimali Perera (SL) and Sarika Prasad (Sin)
Player of the match: Kavisha Egodage (UAE)

- Malaysia won the toss and elected to bat.
- The match was reduced to 16 overs per side due to rain.
- Vaishnave Mahesh (UAE) became the youngest player among male or female, to take 50th wicket in T20Is.

1 September 2023
13:30
Scorecard

Bahrain; 31 (15.4 overs)	v	Nepal; 32/0 (2.5 overs)
Deepika Rasangika 11 (20); Indu Barma 3/5 (4 overs)		Kabita Kunwar 17* (14)

Nepal won by 10 wickets
Selangor Turf Club, Seri Kembangan
Umpires: Viswanadan Kalidas (Mas) and Vrinda Rathi (Ind)
Player of the match: Indu Barma (Nep)

- Bahrain won the toss and elected to bat.

3 September 2023
09:30
Scorecard

Malaysia; 108/4 (20 overs)	v	Bahrain; 62 (16.4 overs)
Mas Elysa 54* (54); Pavithra Shetty 1/18 (4 overs); Tharanga Gajanayake 1/18 (4 overs)		Deepika Rasangika 34 (31); Aisya Eleesa 3/21 (4 overs)

Malaysia won by 46 runs
Bayuemas Oval, Pandamaran
Umpires: Narayanan Janani (Ind) and Shivani Mishra (Qat)
Player of the match: Mas Elysa (Mas)

- Bahrain won the toss and elected to field.

3 September 2023
09:30
Scorecard

Bhutan; 39/8 (20 overs)	v	Nepal; 41/7 (13.2 overs)
Dechen Wangmo 21 (44); Puja Mahato 3/6 (3 overs)		Rubina Chhetry 12* (23); Anjuli Ghalley 3/12 (4 overs)

Nepal won by 3 wickets
UKM-YSD Cricket Oval, Bangi
Umpires: Tabarak Dar (HK) and Nimali Perera (SL)
Player of the match: Puja Mahato (Nep)

- Nepal won the toss and elected to field.
- Rubi Poddar (Nep) made her T20I debut.

3 September 2023
09:30
Scorecard

United Arab Emirates; 114/5 (20 overs)	v	Qatar; 63/8 (20 overs)
Kavisha Egodage 40 (45); Aysha 3/18 (4 overs)		Angeline Mare 11 (13); Esha Oza 2/7 (3 overs)

United Arab Emirates won by 51 runs
Selangor Turf Club, Seri Kembangan
Umpires: Vinay Kumar Jha (Nep) and Vrinda Rathi (Ind)
Player of the match: Esha Oza (UAE)

- United Arab Emirates won the toss and elected to bat.

4 September 2023
09:30
Scorecard

United Arab Emirates; 142/3 (20 overs)	v	Bahrain; 48/4 (17.1 overs)
Esha Oza 78* (60); Tharanga Gajanayake 2/15 (4 overs)		Deepika Rasangika 25* (29); Vaishnave Mahesh 4/10 (4 overs)

United Arab Emirates won by 69 runs (DLS method)
Bayuemas Oval, Pandamaran
Umpires: Shivani Mishra (Qat) and Durga Subedi (Nep)
Player of the match: Esha Oza (UAE)

- Bahrain won the toss and elected to field.
- No further play was possible due to rain.
- Al Maseera Jahangir (UAE) made her T20I debut.

4 September 2023
09:30
Scorecard

Qatar; 74/7 (20 overs)	v	Nepal; 75/1 (10.3 overs)
Saachi Dhadwal 21 (44); Indu Barma 3/10 (4 overs)		Kajal Shrestha 32 (28); Sabeeja Panayan 1/23 (3 overs)

Nepal won by 9 wickets
UKM-YSD Cricket Oval, Bangi
Umpires: Viswanadan Kalidas (Mas) and Vrinda Rathi (Ind)
Player of the match: Indu Barma (Nep)

- Nepal won the toss and elected to field.

4 September 2023
09:30
Scorecard

Bhutan; 59/8 (20 overs)	v	Malaysia; 63/2 (15.4 overs)
Ngawang Choden 19 (41); Nur Dania Syuhada 2/7 (4 overs)		Winifred Duraisingam 22 (32); Tshering Zangmo 2/11 (4 overs)

Malaysia won by 8 wickets
Selangor Turf Club, Seri Kembangan
Umpires: Narayanan Janani (Ind) and Nimali Perera (SL)
Player of the match: Nur Dania Syuhada (Mas)

- Malaysia won the toss and elected to field.

6 September 2023
09:30
Scorecard

Malaysia	v	Qatar

Match abandoned
Bayuemas Oval, Pandamaran
Umpires: Narayanan Janani (Ind) and Vinay Kumar Jha (Nep)

- No toss.
- No play was possible due to rain.

6 September 2023
09:30
Scorecard

Bahrain	v	Bhutan

Match abandoned
UKM-YSD Cricket Oval, Bangi
Umpires: Shivani Mishra (Qat) and Dedunu Silva (SL)

- No toss.
- No play was possible due to rain.

6 September 2023
09:30
Scorecard

United Arab Emirates	v	Nepal

Match abandoned
Selangor Turf Club, Seri Kembangan
Umpires: Tabarak Dar (HK) and Viswanadan Kalidas (Mas)

- No toss.
- No play was possible due to rain.

=== Group B ===
==== Points table ====
Pos	Team	Pld	W	L	NR	Pts	NRR	Qualification
1	Thailand	4	3	0	1	7	3.558	Advanced to the knockout stage
2	Hong Kong	4	3	1	0	6	0.999	Advanced to the knockout stage
3	Kuwait	4	2	1	1	5	−0.239	
4	China	4	1	3	0	2	−1.147	
5	Myanmar	4	0	4	0	0	−2.550	

Source: ESPNcricinfo

==== Fixtures ====
31 August 2023
13:30
Scorecard

Kuwait; 83 (20 overs)	v	China; 53 (16 overs)
Siobhan Gomez 25 (27); Xiuli Jin 5/15 (4 overs)		Yuanyuan Cai 12 (10); Maryam Omar 3/9 (4 overs)

Kuwait won by 30 runs
Bayuemas Oval, Pandamaran
Umpires: Nimali Perera (SL) and Sarika Prasad (Sin)
Player of the match: Xiuli Jin (Chn)

- China won the toss and elected to field.
- Zi Mei (Chn) made her T20I debut.
- Xiuli Jin became the first cricketer for China to take a five-wicket haul in women's T20Is.

31 August 2023
13:30
Scorecard

Myanmar; 69/6 (20 overs)	v	Hong Kong; 70/0 (11.4 overs)
Khin Myat 17 (31); Maryam Bibi 3/13 (4 overs)		Mariko Hill 33* (36)

Hong Kong won by 10 wickets
UKM-YSD Cricket Oval, Bangi
Umpires: Narayanan Janani (Ind) and Viswanadan Kalidas (Mas)
Player of the match: Maryam Bibi (HK)

- Hong Kong won the toss and elected to field.

1 September 2023
09:30
Scorecard

Thailand; 121/4 (20 overs)	v	Myanmar; 21/9 (20 overs)
Natthakan Chantam 54* (61); Lin Htun 1/18 (4 overs)		Zin Kyaw 9* (41); Nattaya Boochatham 5/5 (4 overs)

Thailand won by 100 runs
Bayuemas Oval, Pandamaran
Umpires: Dedunu Silva (SL) and Durga Subedi (Nep)
Player of the match: Nattaya Boochatham (Tha)

- Myanmar won the toss and elected to field.
- Nattaya Boochatham (Tha) took her first five-wicket haul in T20Is.

1 September 2023
09:30
Scorecard

China; 73/7 (20 overs)	v	Hong Kong; 74/5 (16.5 overs)
Caiyun Zhou 19 (36); Mariko Hill 2/11 (4 overs)		Natasha Miles 26 (32); Xu Qian 2/9 (3.5 overs)

Hong Kong won by 5 wickets
Selangor Turf Club, Seri Kembangan
Umpires: Shivani Mishra (Qat) and Vrinda Rathi (Ind)
Player of the match: Mariko Hill (HK)

- Hong Kong won the toss and elected to field.
- Wenjing Yin (Chn) made her T20I debut.

3 September 2023
13:30
Scorecard

Kuwait; 26 (12.2 overs)	v	Hong Kong; 27/2 (5.3 overs)
Balasubramani Shanti 5 (8); Kary Chan 5/4 (3 overs)		Natasha Miles 10 (14); Amna Tariq 1/2 (1 over)

Hong Kong won by 8 wickets
Bayuemas Oval, Pandamaran
Umpires: Nimali Perera (SL) and Durga Subedi (Nep)
Player of the match: Kary Chan (HK)

- Hong Kong won the toss and elected to field.

3 September 2023
13:30
Scorecard

China; 35 (12.3 overs)	v	Thailand; 36/1 (8 overs)
Yuanyuan Cai 14* (11); Phannita Maya 3/10 (4 overs)		Nannapat Koncharoenkai 13* (24); Xu Qian 1/20 (4 overs)

Thailand won by 9 wickets
UKM-YSD Cricket Oval, Bangi
Umpires: Tabarak Dar (HK) and Dedunu Silva (SL)
Player of the match: Phannita Maya (Tha)

- China won the toss and elected to bat.

4 September 2023
13:30
Scorecard

Myanmar; 49/6 (11 overs)	v	China; 52/1 (6.5 overs)
Zon Lin 13 (21); Xu Qian 2/10 (3 overs)		Chen Yue 28* (25)

China won by 9 wickets
UKM-YSD Cricket Oval, Bangi
Umpires: Sarika Prasad (Sin) and Vrinda Rathi (Ind)
Player of the match: Chen Yue (Chn)

- China won the toss and elected to field.
- The match was reduced to 11 overs per side due to rain.

4 September 2023
13:30
Scorecard

Kuwait; 22/4 (9.5 overs)	v	Thailand
Priyada Murali 11 (17); Nattaya Boochatham 3/3 (3 overs)

No result
Selangor Turf Club, Seri Kembangan
Umpires: Narayanan Janani (Ind) and Vinay Kumar Jha (Nep)

- Thailand won the toss and elected to field.
- No further play was possible due to rain.

6 September 2023
13:30
Scorecard

Kuwait; 85/5 (20 overs)	v	Myanmar; 78/8 (20 overs)
Maryam Omar 25* (27); Zon Lin 4/7 (4 overs)		Zin Kyaw 30 (31); Mariamma Hyder 2/10 (4 overs)

Kuwait won by 7 runs
Bayuemas Oval, Pandamaran
Umpires: Vinay Kumar Jha (Nep) and Durga Subedi (Nep)
Player of the match: Zon Lin (Mya)

- Myanmar won the toss and elected to field.

6 September 2023
13:30
Scorecard

Thailand; 121/4 (20 overs)	v	Hong Kong; 78/9 (20 overs)
Nannapat Koncharoenkai 75 (58); Alison Siu 1/18 4 overs)		Marina Lamplough 19 (29); Nattaya Boochatham 4/9 (4 overs)

Thailand won by 43 runs
UKM-YSD Cricket Oval, Bangi
Umpires: Shivani Mishra (Qat) and Sarika Prasad (Sin)
Player of the match: Nannapat Koncharoenkai (Tha)

- Hong Kong won the toss and elected to field.

== Knockout stage ==
=== Bracket ===
Semi-finals
A1	United Arab Emirates	141/4 (20)
B2	Hong Kong	84 (16.5)
B1	Thailand	105/2 (20)
A2	Nepal	59 (19.3)

Final
A1	United Arab Emirates	70/9 (20)
B1	Thailand	64 (17.5)

=== Semi-finals ===
==== 1st semi-final ====
8 September 2023
09:30
Scorecard

United Arab Emirates; 141/4 (20 overs)	v	Hong Kong; 84 (16.5 overs)
Esha Oza 85 (60); Ruchitha Venkatesh 1/24 (4 overs)		Maryam Bibi 34 (37); Esha Oza 2/6 (1 over)

United Arab Emirates won by 57 runs
Bayuemas Oval, Pandamaran
Umpires: Viswanadan Kalidas (Mas) and Sarika Prasad (Sin)
Player of the match: Esha Oza (UAE)

- United Arab Emirates won the toss and elected to bat.

==== 2nd semi-final ====
8 September 2023
09:30
Scorecard

Thailand; 105/2 (20 overs)	v	Nepal; 59 (19.3 overs)
Nannapat Koncharoenkai 59* (63); Kabita Kunwar 1/17 (4 overs)		Kabita Kunwar 17* (20); Thipatcha Putthawong 3/5 (3.3 overs)

Thailand won by 46 runs
UKM-YSD Cricket Oval, Bangi
Umpires: Tabarak Dar (HK) and Durga Subedi (Nep)
Player of the match: Nannapat Koncharoenkai (Tha)

- Nepal won the toss and elected to field.

=== Final ===
9 September 2023
09:30
Scorecard

United Arab Emirates; 70/9 (20 overs)	v	Thailand; 64 (17.5 overs)
Theertha Satish 23 (33); Onnicha Kamchomphu 3/6 (4 overs)		Natthakan Chantam 22 (27); Kavisha Egodage 3/7 (2.5 overs)

United Arab Emirates won by 6 runs
Bayuemas Oval, Pandamaran
Umpires: Nimali Perera (SL) and Vrinda Rathi (Ind)
Player of the match: Kavisha Egodage (UAE)

- United Arab Emirates won the toss and elected to bat.
