= 2025 Women's T20 World Cup Asia Qualifier =

Qualifying tournament for 2026 Women's T20 World Cup

- Dates: 9 – 20 May 2025
- Administrator: Asian Cricket Council
- Cricket format: Twenty20 International
- Tournament format: Two-stage round-robin
- Host: Thailand
- Champions: Thailand
- Runners-up: Nepal
- Participants: 9
- Matches: 21
- Player of the series: (Thailand) Nannapat Koncharoenkai
- Most runs: (United Arab Emirates) Esha Oza (175)
- Most wickets: (Thailand) Thipatcha Putthawong (8)

The 2025 ICC Women's T20 World Cup Asia Qualifier was a cricket tournament that formed part of the qualification process for the 2026 Women's T20 World Cup. The tournament was hosted by Thailand in May 2025.

The hosts defeated Nepal in the final match to win the Asia qualifier. As the top two teams from the tournament, Thailand and Nepal qualified for the Global Qualifier. Thailand's Nannapat Koncharoenkai was named player of the series.

== Squads ==
Bahrain	Bhutan	Hong Kong	Kuwait	Malaysia
Deepika Rasangika (c); Sadamali Bhakshala; Sana Butt (wk); Zayneb Fazli; Tharanga Gajanayake; Ashwini Govinda (wk); Poorvaja Jagdeesha; Saee Parkhi; Rasika Rodrigo; Pavithra Shetty; Saduni Uthpala; Sara Vivek; Abeera Waris; Shruti Yadav	Dechen Wangmo (c); Anju Gurung (vc); Ngawang Choden (wk); Ritshi Choden; Sonam Choden; Tshering Choden; Yeshey Choden; Karma Dema; Sonam Pelden; Riya Pradhan; Sonam; Eva Yangzom; Tshering Zangmo	Natasha Miles (c); Maryam Bibi; Betty Chan; Kary Chan; Shing Chan; Hiu Ying Cheung (wk); Yasmin Daswani (wk); Mariko Hill; Emma Lai; Kaur Mahekdeep; Iqra Sahar; Shanzeen Shahzad (wk); Alison Siu; Ruchitha Venkatesh	Amna Tariq (c); Priyada Murali (vc); Suchitha D'Sa (wk); Raelyn D'Souza; Venora D'Souza; Candice Dias; Siobhan Gomez; Mariamma Hyder; Maria Jasvi; Zeefa Jilani; Khadija Khalil (wk); Maryam Omar; Balasubramani Shanti; Bhavani Yekkeli	Mas Elysa (c); Elsa Hunter (vc); Aisya Eleesa; Ainna Hamizah Hashim; Nazatul Hidayah Husna; Mahirah Izzati Ismail; Wan Julia (wk); Suabika Manivannan; Aina Najwa (wk); Siti Nazwah; Marsya Qistina Binti Abdullah; Amalin Sorfina; Nur Izzatul Syafiqa; Nur Dania Syuhada
Nepal	Qatar	Thailand	United Arab Emirates	
Indu Barma (c); Puja Mahato (vc); Rajmati Airee; Ishwari Bist; Rubina Chhetry; Kabita Joshi; Samjhana Khadka; Kabita Kunwar; Rubi Poddar (wk); Sabnam Rai; Bindu Rawal; Riya Sharma; Roma Thapa (wk); Manisha Upadhyay	Aysha (c); Hiral Agarwal; Roheed Akhtar; Shahreen Bahadur; Rizpha Bano Emmanuel (wk); Khadija Imtiaz; Christeena Jacob; Maria Jacob; Amma Kashif; Angeline Mare; Sabeeja Panayan; Sudha Thapa	Naruemol Chaiwai (c); Nattaya Boochatham; Nannaphat Chaihan; Natthakan Chantham; Sunida Chaturongrattana; Onnicha Kamchomphu; Rosenanee Kanoh; Suwanan Khiaoto (wk); Nannapat Koncharoenkai (wk); Suleeporn Laomi; Phannita Maya; Thipatcha Putthawong; Chanida Sutthiruang; Aphisara Suwanchonrathi	Esha Oza (c, wk); Michelle Botha; Udeni Dona; Heena Hotchandani; Al Maseera Jahangir; Lavanya Keny; Suraksha Kotte; Vaishnave Mahesh; Indhuja Nandakumar; Rinitha Rajith; Keziah Sabin; Theertha Satish (wk); Athige Silva; Katie Thompson	

== Quadrangular series ==
Ahead of the qualifier, Hong Kong, Kuwait, Thailand and United Arab Emirates contested a round-robin quadrangular tournament.

Quadrangular Series Matches

2025 Thailand Women's Quadrangular Series
- Dates: 3 – 6 May 2025
- Administrator: Cricket Association of Thailand
- Cricket format: Twenty20 International
- Tournament format: Round-robin
- Host: Thailand
- Champions: Thailand
- Runners-up: United Arab Emirates
- Participants: 4
- Matches: 6
- Most runs: (United Arab Emirates) Theertha Satish (107)
- Most wickets: (Thailand) Suleeporn Laomi (9)

=== Points table ===
Pos	Team	Pld	W	L	NR	Pts	NRR
1	Thailand	3	3	0	0	6	1.483
2	United Arab Emirates	3	2	1	0	4	1.183
3	Hong Kong	3	1	2	0	2	−0.217
4	Kuwait	3	0	3	0	0	−2.544

Source: ESPNcricinfo

=== Fixtures ===
3 May 2025
09:00
Scorecard

United Arab Emirates; 94/5 (20 overs)	v	Hong Kong; 88/6 (20 overs)
Esha Oza 30 (42); Betty Chan 2/12 (4 overs)		Mariko Hill 43 (56); Michelle Botha 3/9 (4 overs)

United Arab Emirates won by 6 runs
Terdthai Cricket Ground, Bangkok
Umpires: Samad Akbar (Tha) and Rajesh Pillai (Ken)
Player of the match: Michelle Botha (UAE)

- Hong Kong won the toss and elected to field.
- Michelle Botha, Athige Silva and Katie Thompson (UAE) all made their T20I debuts.

3 May 2025
13:30
Scorecard

Kuwait; 57 (17.3 overs)	v	Thailand; 60/4 (13.2 overs)
Balasubramani Shanti 24 (31); Onnicha Kamchomphu 3/4 (2.3 overs)		Natthakan Chantham 21* (31); Mariamma Hyder 2/18 (4 overs)

Thailand won by 6 wickets
Terdthai Cricket Ground, Bangkok
Umpires: Samad Akbar (Tha) and Ashwani Kumar Rana (Tha)
Player of the match: Onnicha Kamchomphu (Tha)

- Kuwait won the toss and elected to bat.

4 May 2025
09:00
Scorecard

Thailand; 127/5 (20 overs)	v	Hong Kong; 95/8 (20 overs)
Natthakan Chantham (25); Alison Siu 2/31 (4 overs)		Mariko Hill 31 (45); Suleeporn Laomi 4/15 (4 overs)

Thailand won by 32 runs
Terdthai Cricket Ground, Bangkok
Umpires: Rajesh Pillai (Ken) and Ashwani Kumar Rana (Tha)
Player of the match: Suleeporn Laomi (Tha)

- Hong Kong won the toss end elected to field.

4 May 2025
13:30
Scorecard

United Arab Emirates; 154/5 (20 overs)	v	Kuwait; 73/6 (20 overs)
Theertha Satish 64 (45); Priyada Murali 2/33 (4 overs)		Maryam Omar 29 (48); Athige Silva 2/9 (4 overs)

United Arab Emirates won by 81 runs
Terdthai Cricket Ground, Bangkok
Umpires: Samad Akbar (Tha) and Ashwani Kumar Rana (Tha)
Player of the match: Theertha Satish (UAE)

- United Arab Emirates won the toss and elected to bat.

6 May 2025
09:00
Scorecard

Hong Kong; 135/6 (20 overs)	v	Kuwait; 110/8 (20 overs)
Shanzeen Shahzad 53 (47); Zeefa Jilani 2/31 (4 overs)		Maryam Omar 65* (58); Shing Chan 3/13 (3 overs)

Hong Kong won by 25 runs
Terdthai Cricket Ground, Bangkok
Umpires: Sanjeev Jeyasooriyam (Tha) and Rajesh Pillai (Ken)
Player of the match: Shanzeen Shahzad (HK)

- Kuwait won the toss and elected to field.

6 May 2025
13:30
Scorecard

Thailand; 117/5 (20 overs)	v	United Arab Emirates; 101 (19.1 overs)
Aphisara Suwanchonrathi 28 (35); Michelle Botha 2/7 (4 overs)		Theertha Satish 41 (48); Suleeporn Laomi 3/12 (4 overs)

Thailand won by 16 runs
Terdthai Cricket Ground, Bangkok
Umpires: Samad Akbar (Tha) and Sanjeev Jeyasooriyam (Tha)
Player of the match: Suleeporn Laomi (Tha)

- Thailand won the toss and elected to field.

== Group stage ==
=== Group A ===
==== Points table ====
Pos	Team	Pld	W	L	T	NR	Pts	NRR	Qualification
1	Thailand	4	2	0	0	2	6	4.642	Advanced to the Super Three
2	Kuwait	4	1	2	0	1	3	−0.476	
3	Bhutan	4	1	2	0	1	3	−1.774	

Source: ESPNcricinfo

==== Fixtures ====
9 May 2025
09:00
Scorecard

Kuwait; 56/8 (20 overs)	v	Thailand; 57/2 (9 overs)
Mariamma Hyder 15 (22); Phannita Maya 2/9 (4 overs); Thipatcha Putthawong 2/9 (4 overs)		Aphisara Suwanchonrathi 22* (24); Priyada Murali 1/9 (1 over)

Thailand won by 8 wickets
Terdthai Cricket Ground, Bangkok
Umpires: Tabarak Dar (HK) and Narayanan Janani (Ind)
Player of the match: Phannita Maya (Tha)

- Thailand won the toss and elected to field.

10 May 2025
09:00
Scorecard

Thailand	v	Bhutan

Match abandoned
Asian Institute of Technology Ground, Bangkok
Umpires: Shivani Mishra (Qat) and Rokeya Sultana (Ban)

- No toss.
- No play was possible due to rain and wet outfield.

12 May 2025
09:00
Scorecard

Kuwait; 85/3 (13 overs)	v	Bhutan; 50/6 (13 overs)
Priyada Murali 36 (29); Sonam Choden 2/16 (3 overs)		Ngawang Choden 16 (17); Maria Jasvi 2/9 (3 overs)

Kuwait won by 35 runs
Terdthai Cricket Ground, Bangkok
Umpires: Akbar Ali (UAE) and Shivani Mishra (Qat)
Player of the match: Priyada Murali (Kuw)

- Bhutan won the toss and elected to field.
- The match was reduced to 13 overs per side due to rain and wet outfield.
- Sangay Yangzom (Bhu) made her T20I debut.

13 May 2025
09:00
Scorecard

Thailand	v	Kuwait

Match abandoned
Terdthai Cricket Ground, Bangkok
Umpires: Shivani Mishra (Qat) and Rokeya Sultana (Ban)

- No toss.
- No play was possible due to rain.

15 May 2025
09:00
Scorecard

Thailand; 88/3 (9 overs)	v	Bhutan; 43/5 (9 overs)
Chanida Sutthiruang 37 (30); Ritshi Choden 1/14 (2 overs)		Tshering Zangmo 15 (15); Suleeporn Laomi 2/7 (2 overs)

Thailand won by 45 runs
Terdthai Cricket Ground, Bangkok
Umpires: Tabarak Dar (HK) and Shivani Mishra (Qat)
Player of the match: Nannapat Koncharoenkai (Tha)

- Bhutan won the toss and elected to field.
- The match was reduced to 9 overs per side due to rain.

16 May 2025
09:00
Scorecard

Kuwait; 92/3 (20 overs)	v	Bhutan; 96/6 (19.4 overs)
Maryam Omar 32* (47); Anju Gurung 1/11 (4 overs)		Dechen Wangmo 38* (40); Zeefa Jilani 2/14 (4 overs)

Bhutan won by 4 wickets
Terdthai Cricket Ground, Bangkok
Umpires: Akbar Ali (UAE) and Shivani Mishra (Qat)
Player of the match: Dechen Wangmo (Bhu)

- Bhutan won the toss and elected to field.

=== Group B ===
==== Points table ====
Pos	Team	Pld	W	L	T	NR	Pts	NRR	Qualification
1	United Arab Emirates	4	2	0	0	2	6	6.998	Advanced to the Super Three
2	Malaysia	4	1	1	0	2	4	3.059	
3	Qatar	4	0	2	0	2	2	−7.843	

Source: ESPNcricinfo

==== Fixtures ====
9 May 2025
13:30
Scorecard

Malaysia; 30/8 (7 overs)	v	United Arab Emirates; 33/1 (4.3 overs)
Mas Elysa 16 (17); Katie Thompson 4/7 (2 overs)		Lavanya Keny 16* (12)

United Arab Emirates won by 9 wickets
Asian Institute of Technology Ground, Bangkok
Umpires: Samad Akbar (Tha) and Rokeya Sultana (Ban)
Player of the match: Katie Thompson (UAE)

- United Arab Emirates won the toss and elected to field.
- The match was reduced to 7 overs per side due to rain.
- Nazatul Hidayah Husna (Mas) made her T20I debut.

10 May 2025
13:30
Scorecard

United Arab Emirates; 192 (16 overs)	v	Qatar; 29 (11.1 overs)
Esha Oza 113 (55)		Rizpha Bano Emmanuel 20 (29); Michelle Botha 3/11 (4 overs)

United Arab Emirates won by 163 runs
Terdthai Cricket Ground, Bangkok
Umpires: Tabarak Dar (HK) and Narayanan Janani (Ind)
Player of the match: Esha Oza (UAE)

- United Arab Emirates won the toss and elected to bat.
- Christeena Jacob (Qat) made her T20I debut.
- All ten United Arab Emirates batters retired out after 16 overs of their innings, in an attempt to ensure that a result was achieved before rain arrived.

12 May 2025
13:30
Scorecard

Malaysia	v	Qatar

Match abandoned
Asian Institute of Technology Ground, Bangkok
Umpires: Tabarak Dar (HK) and Narayanan Janani (Ind)

- No toss.
- No play was possible due to rain and wet outfield.

13 May 2025
13:30
Scorecard

Malaysia	v	United Arab Emirates

Match abandoned
Terdthai Cricket Ground, Bangkok
Umpires: Tabarak Dar (HK) and Shivani Mishra (Qat)

- No toss.
- No play was possible due to rain and wet outfield.

15 May 2025
13:30
Scorecard

Qatar	v	United Arab Emirates

Match abandoned
Asian Institute of Technology Ground, Bangkok
Umpires: Samad Akbar (Tha) and Narayanan Janani (Ind)

- No toss.
- No play was possible due to rain and wet outfield.

16 May 2025
13:30
Scorecard

Qatar; 39 (16.3 overs)	v	Malaysia; 41/0 (4 overs)
Khadija Imtiaz 7 (11); Aisya Eleesa 2/7 (3 overs)		Ainna Hamizah Hashim 19* (14)

Malaysia won by 10 wickets (DLS method)
Terdthai Cricket Ground, Bangkok
Umpires: Akbar Ali (UAE) and Narayanan Janani (Ind)
Player of the match: Ainna Hamizah Hashim (Mas)

- Malaysia won the toss and elected to field.
- Malaysia were set a revised target of 41 runs in 17 overs due to rain.
- Marsya Qistina Binti Abdullah (Mas) made her T20I debut.

=== Group C ===
==== Points table ====
Pos	Team	Pld	W	L	T	NR	Pts	NRR	Qualification
1	Nepal	4	2	1	0	1	5	0.830	Advanced to the Super Three
2	Hong Kong	4	1	0	0	3	5	0.867	
3	Bahrain	4	0	2	0	2	2	−1.800	

Source: ESPNcricinfo

==== Fixtures ====
9 May 2025
09:00
Scorecard

Hong Kong	v	Nepal

Match abandoned
Asian Institute of Technology Ground, Bangkok
Umpires: Samad Akbar (Tha) and Akbar Ali (UAE)

- No toss.
- No play was possible due to rain and wet outfield.

10 May 2025
09:00
Scorecard

Bahrain; 41/1 (5 overs)	v	Nepal; 42/1 (4.2 overs)
Deepika Rasangika 34* (13); Puja Mahato 1/13 (2 overs)		Kabita Kunwar 18 (11)

Nepal won by 9 wickets
Terdthai Cricket Ground, Bangkok
Umpires: Akbar Ali (UAE) and Narayanan Janani (Ind)
Player of the match: Kabita Kunwar (Nep)

- Nepal won the toss and elected to field.
- The match was reduced to 5 overs per side due to rain.

12 May 2025
13:30
Scorecard

Bahrain; 15/0 (4 overs)	v	Hong Kong
Tharanga Gajanayake 8* (11)

No result
Terdthai Cricket Ground, Bangkok
Umpires: Samad Akbar (Tha) and Akbar Ali (UAE)

- Bahrain won the toss and elected to bat.
- No further play was possible due to rain.

13 May 2025
13:30
Scorecard

Nepal; 29/3 (5 overs)	v	Hong Kong; 30/3 (4.3 overs)
Samjhana Khadka 10 (7); Alison Siu 3/11 (2 overs)		Shanzeen Shahzad 15* (12); Kabita Kunwar 2/5 (1.3 overs)

Hong Kong won by 7 wickets
Asian Institute of Technology Ground, Bangkok
Umpires: Akbar Ali (UAE) and Narayanan Janani (Ind)
Player of the match: Alison Siu (HK)

- Hong Kong won the toss and elected to field.
- The match was reduced to 5 overs per side due to rain.

15 May 2025
13:30
Scorecard

Bahrain; 76/3 (12.4 overs)	v	Nepal; 56/4 (5.4 overs)
Rasika Rodrigo 24 (29)		Indu Barma 24* (7); Pavithra Shetty 3/10 (2 overs)

Nepal won by 6 wickets (DLS method)
Terdthai Cricket Ground, Bangkok
Umpires: Tabarak Dar (HK) and Rokeya Sultana (Ban)
Player of the match: Indu Barma (Nep)

- Bahrain won the toss and elected to bat.
- Nepal were set a revised target of 56 runs in 7 overs.

16 May 2025
13:30
Scorecard

Bahrain	v	Hong Kong

Match abandoned
Asian Institute of Technology Ground, Bangkok
Umpires: Samad Akbar (Tha) and Rokeya Sultana (Ban)

- Bahrain won the toss and elected to bat.
- No play was possible due to rain.

== Super Three ==
=== Points table ===
Pos	Team	Pld	W	L	T	NR	Pts	NRR	Qualification
1	Thailand	6	4	0	0	2	10	3.808	Qualified for the global qualifier
2	Nepal	6	3	2	0	1	7	−1.136	Qualified for the global qualifier
3	United Arab Emirates	6	2	2	0	2	6	1.869	

Source: ESPNcricinfo

=== Fixtures ===
18 May 2025
10:00
Scorecard

Thailand; 144/5 (20 overs)	v	United Arab Emirates; 90/5 (20 overs)
Nattaya Boochatham 49 (48); Esha Oza 2/20 (3 overs)		Heena Hotchandani 32 (46); Thipatcha Putthawong 2/27 (4 overs)

Thailand won by 54 runs
Terdthai Cricket Ground, Bangkok
Umpires: Tabarak Dar (HK) and Narayanan Janani (Ind)
Player of the match: Natthakan Chantham (Tha)

- Thailand won the toss and elected to bat.

19 May 2025
10:00
Scorecard

United Arab Emirates; 114/7 (20 overs)	v	Nepal; 115/5 (19.3 overs)
Esha Oza 39 (39); Manisha Upadhayay 4/20 (4 overs)		Indu Barma 30* (28); Esha Oza 1/11 (1.3 overs)

Nepal won by 5 wickets
Terdthai Cricket Ground, Bangkok
Umpires: Samad Akbar (Tha) and Shivani Mishra (Qat)
Player of the match: Indu Barma (Nep)

- Nepal won the toss and elected to field.

20 May 2025
10:00
Scorecard

Thailand; 158/2 (20 overs)	v	Nepal; 80/9 (20 overs)
Nannapat Koncharoenkai 50* (28); Manisha Upadhayay 1/24 (3 overs)		Kabita Kunwar 24 (33); Onnicha Kamchomphu 4/11 (4 overs)

Thailand won by 78 runs
Terdthai Cricket Ground, Bangkok
Umpires: Tabarak Dar (HK) and Rokeya Sultana (Ban)
Player of the match: Nannapat Koncharoenkai (Tha)

- Nepal won the toss and elected to field.
- Onnicha Kamchomphu (Tha) took a hat-trick.
