= List of United Arab Emirates women ODI cricketers =

This is a list of United Arab Emirates women One-day international cricketers. A One Day International, or an ODI, is an international cricket match between two representative teams, each having ODI status. An ODI differs from test matches in that the number of overs per team is limited, and that each team has only one innings. UAE women were granted ODI status by the International Cricket Council (ICC) in May 2025. UAE women played their first ODI on 26 September 2025, in a 4 match series against Zimbabwe.

The list is arranged in the order in which each player won her first ODI cap. Where more than one player won her first ODI cap in the same match, those players are listed alphabetically by surname.

== Key ==
General

- † – Wicket-keeper
- First – Year of debut
- Last – Year of latest game
- Mat – Number of matches played

Batting

- Runs – Runs scored in career
- HS – Highest score
- Avg – Average runs scored per dismissal
- 50s – Number of half centuries
- 100 – Centuries scored
- * – Batsman remained not out

Bowling

- Balls – Balls bowled in career
- Wkt – Wickets taken in career
- BBI – Best bowling in an innings
- Ave – Average runs conceded per wicket

Fielding

- Ca – Catches taken
- St – Stumpings taken

== Players ==
Updated as of 19 October 2025.

UAE women ODI cricketers
General					Batting					Bowling				Fielding		Ref
No.	Name	First	Last	Mat	Runs	HS	Avg	50	100	Balls	Wkt	BBI	Ave	Ca	St	Ref
1	Michelle Botha	2025	2025	7	103	42*	20.60	0	0	276	13	3/2	13.53	3	–	
2	Samaira Dharnidharka	2025	2025	8	122	45	20.33	0	0	363	10	4/19	23.30	2	–	
3	Udeni Dona	2025	2025	6	88	56	22.00	1	0	–	–	–	–	1	–	
4	Heena Hotchandani	2025	2025	4	119	40	29.75	0	0	60	0	–	–	1	–	
5	Lavanya Keny	2025	2025	8	112	47	14.00	0	0	–	–	–	–	0	–	
6	Vaishnave Mahesh	2025	2025	7	75	22	15.00	0	0	158	1	1/34	125.0	3	–	
7	Esha Oza‡	2025	2025	8	148	82	18.50	1	0	390	14	3/25	15.14	6	–	
8	Rinitha Rajith	2025	2025	8	147	59*	21.00	1	0	–	–	–	–	1	–	
9	Theertha Satish†	2025	2025	8	219	66	31.28	1	0	–	–	–	–	6	4	
10	Athige Silva	2025	2025	4	1	1*	–	0	0	156	5	3/46	25.00	0	–	
11	Katie Thompson	2025	2025	5	13	12*	13.00	0	0	125	2	2/23	35.50	1	–	
12	Al Maseera Jahangir	2025	2025	3	31	12	10.33	0	0	30	2	2/16	8.00	0	–	
13	Indhuja Nandakumar	2025	2025	3	16	16*	–	0	0	156	6	4/50	19.66	1	–	
14	Siya Gokhale	2025	2025	4	27	9*	13.50	0	0	12	0	–	–	1	–	
15	Suraksha Kotte	2025	2025	5	1	1	0.50	0	0	246	9	5/20	12.11	0	–	
