= Katie Thompson =

English cricketer

Personal information
- Full name: Katie Cordelia Thompson
- Born: 28 September 1996 (age 30)
- Batting: Right-handed
- Bowling: Slow left-arm unorthodox
- Role: Bowler

International information
- National side: United Arab Emirates (2025)
- ODI debut (cap 11): 26 September 2025 v Zimbabwe
- Last ODI: 28 September 2025 v Zimbabwe
- T20I debut (cap 40): 3 May 2025 v Hong Kong
- Last T20I: 9 May 2025 v Malaysia

Domestic team information
- Years: Team
- 2014–2021: Yorkshire
- 2016–2018: Yorkshire Diamonds
- 2021: North Representative XI

Career statistics
Competition	WLA	WT20
Matches	29	41
Runs scored	72	63
Batting average	12.00	9.00
100s/50s	0/0	0/0
Top score	27*	13
Balls bowled	1,340	883
Wickets	46	44
Bowling average	11.04	12.56
5 wickets in innings	2	0
10 wickets in match	0	0
Best bowling	6/10	4/4
Catches/stumpings	3/–	6/–
- Source: CricketArchive, 2 October 2021

Katie Cordelia Thompson (born 28 September 1996) is an English cricketer who plays as a slow left-arm unorthodox bowler. She has played for Yorkshire and North Representative XI, as well as playing for Yorkshire Diamonds in the Women's Cricket Super League between 2016 and 2018.

== Domestic career ==
Thompson made her county debut in 2014, for Yorkshire against Essex. In 2015, Thompson helped her side to their 6th County Championship title, and took 5 wickets at an average of 26.80. The following season, she was her side's leading wicket-taker in the 2016 Women's County Championship, with 12 wickets at an average of 12, including taking 6/10 against Somerset. In 2018, Thompson was again successful, taking 11 wickets in both the County Championship and Twenty20 Cup. In 2019, Thompson was the joint-leading wicket-taker across the whole Championship, with 15 wickets at an average of 8.40. She also took her Twenty20 best bowling figures, with 4/4 against Durham. In 2021, Thompson was named as part of the Yorkshire contingent of the North Representative XI squad for the Twenty20 Cup, taking one wicket in four matches.

Thompson also played for Yorkshire Diamonds in the Women's Cricket Super League between 2016 and 2018. She played four matches across the three seasons, with her best performance coming in a 2018 match against Loughborough Lightning, in which she took 2/18 from her four overs.
