= Udeni Dona =

Sri Lankan-born Emirati cricketer (born 1993)

Personal information
- Full name: Udeni Chathurika Kuruppu Arachcige Dona
- Born: 12 March 1993 (age 33); Colombo, Sri Lanka
- Batting: Left-handed
- Bowling: Right-arm slow-medium
- Role: All-Rounder

International information
- National side: United Arab Emirates
- ODI debut (cap 3): 26 September 2025 v Zimbabwe
- Last ODI: 28 September 2025 v Zimbabwe
- T20I debut (cap 2): 7 July 2018 v Netherlands
- Last T20I: 27 February 2019 v Thailand
- Source: Cricinfo, 22 November 2021

Udeni Dona (born 12 March 1993) is a Sri Lankan-born cricketer who plays for the United Arab Emirates national cricket team. In July 2018, she was named in the United Arab Emirates' squad for the 2018 ICC Women's World Twenty20 Qualifier tournament. She made her Women's Twenty20 International (WT20I) debut against the Netherlands in the Women's World Twenty20 Qualifier on 7 July 2018.
