= Heena Hotchandani =

Emirati cricketer (born 2000)

Personal information
- Born: 22 October 2000 (age 26)
- Batting: Left-handed
- Bowling: Slow left-arm orthodox

International information
- National side: United Arab Emirates
- ODI debut (cap 4): 27 September 2025 v Zimbabwe
- Last ODI: 28 September 2025 v Zimbabwe
- T20I debut (cap 4): 7 July 2018 v Netherlands
- Last T20I: 13 September 2024 v Zimbabwe
- Source: Cricinfo, 7 October 2024

Heena Hotchandani is a women's cricketer who plays for the United Arab Emirates national cricket team. In July 2018, she was named in the United Arab Emirates' squad for the 2018 ICC Women's World Twenty20 Qualifier tournament. She made her Women's Twenty20 International (WT20I) debut for the UAE against the Netherlands in the World Twenty20 Qualifier on 7 July 2018.
