= Khushi Sharma =

Emirati cricketer (born 2002)

Personal information
- Born: 21 August 2002 (age 24); Sonipat, Haryana, India
- Batting: Right-handed
- Role: Bowling all-rounder
- Relatives: Sanchit Sharma (brother)

International information
- National side: United Arab Emirates
- T20I debut (cap 23): 22 November 2021 v Malaysia
- Last T20I: 23 July 2024 v Pakistan

Career statistics
Competition	WT20I
Matches	68
Runs scored	450
Batting average	11.84
100s/50s	0/0
Top score	37*
Balls bowled	838
Wickets	48
Bowling average	16.02
5 wickets in innings	1
10 wickets in match	0
Best bowling	5/22
Catches/stumpings	11/–
- Source: ESPNcricinfo, 7 October 2024

Khushi Sharma (born 21 August 2002) is an Indian-born women's cricketer who plays for the United Arab Emirates national cricket team.

== Personal life ==
Sharma grew up in Ajman along with her brother Sanchit Sharma, who made also his debut for the United Arab Emirates cricket team in 2021. Their father Brij Mohan Sharma moved to the UAE from India in 1990 to work as a mechanical engineer and later established a metal trading firm. He also played cricket at senior level in his home state of Haryana.

== International career ==
In November 2021, she was named in UAE's WT20I squad for the 2021 ICC Women's T20 World Cup Asia Qualifier which was held in Dubai. On 22 November 2021, she made her Women's Twenty20 International (WT20I) debut for the UAE against Malaysia.

In March 2022, she also represented the UAE team for the 2022 GCC Women's Gulf Cup held in Muscat, Oman.

== See also ==
- List of United Arab Emirates women Twenty20 International cricketers
