= Siya Gokhale =

Indian-born Emirati cricketer

Personal information
- Full name: Siya Swarup Gokhale
- Born: 15 August 2005 (age 21); Mumbai, India
- Batting: Right-handed
- Bowling: Right arm Medium fast
- Role: Bowling Allrounder

International information
- National side: United Arab Emirates
- ODI debut (cap 14): 2 October 2025 v Zimbabwe
- Last ODI: 15 October 2025 v Papua New Guinea
- T20I debut (cap 25): 20 March 2022 v Qatar
- Last T20I: 5 May 2024 v Sri Lanka
- Source: Cricinfo, 7 October 2024

Siya Swarup Gokhale (born 15 August 2005) is an Indian-born cricketer who plays for the United Arab Emirates women's cricket team.

== International career ==
In March 2022, Gokhale was named in the UAE's WT20I squad for the 2022 GCC Women's Gulf Cup which was held in Muscat, Oman. On 20 March 2022, she made her WT20I debut against Qatar in GCC Women's Gulf Cup. Gokhale won her first Player of the Match award in the UAE-Hong Kong Bilateral Series picking up 3 wickets for 14 runs in her 4-over spell.

In June 2022, she was also part of the UAE squad for the ICC Under-19 Women's T20 World Cup Asia Qualifier 2022 held in Malaysia.

In September 2022, Gokhale was selected for UAE's squad for the 2022 ICC Women's T20 World Cup Qualifier held in Abu Dhabi, UAE.

In October 2022, Gokhale was named to UAE's team squad for the Women's Twenty20 Asia Cup.

In January 2023, Gokhale was named to UAE's team's squad for the 2023 Under-19 Women's T20 World Cup held in South Africa.

== See also ==
- List of United Arab Emirates women Twenty20 International cricketers
