= United Arab Emirates women's national cricket team =

Cricket team

United Arab Emirates
- Association: Emirates Cricket Board

Personnel
- Captain: Esha Oza
- Coach: Ahmed Raza

International Cricket Council
- ICC status: Associate member (1990); Affiliate member (1989)
- ICC region: Asia
ICC Rankings	Current	Best-ever
ODI	15th	15th (31 Oct 2025)
T20I	16th	14th (11 Oct 2018)

International cricket
- First international: v. Bangladesh at Johor, Malaysia; 11 July 2007

One Day Internationals
- First ODI: v Zimbabwe at Queens Sports Club, Bulawayo; 28 September 2025
- Last ODI: v Papua New Guinea at Amini Park, Port Moresby; 19 October 2025
ODIs	Played	Won/Lost
Total	8	4/4 (0 ties, 0 no results)
This year	0	0/0 (0 ties, 0 no results)

T20 Internationals
- First T20I: v. Netherlands at Sportpark Maarschalkerweerd, Utrecht; 7 July 2018
- Last T20I: v. Papua New Guinea at Karwan Cricket Ground, Ajman; 18 November 2026
T20Is	Played	Won/Lost
Total	128	80/45 (1 tie, 2 no results)
This year	14	8/6 (0 ties, 0 no results)
- T20 World Cup Qualifier appearances: 3 (first in 2018)
- Best result: Semi-finals (2024)
ODI & T20I kit
- As of 18 November 2026

The United Arab Emirates women's national cricket team represents the United Arab Emirates in international women's cricket and is controlled by the Emirates Cricket Board (ECB).

== History ==
The UAE Women made their international debut at the 2007 ACC Women's Tournament in Malaysia. The team lost all three of its matches, and on debut against Bangladesh were bowled out for nine runs, in a match which took one hour to complete. The squad was said to consist of "mothers and daughters", and the captain, Natasha Cherriath, was 12 years old. The team's coach was Smitha Harikrishna who formerly played One Day International (ODI) cricket for India, and another ex-India player, Pramila Bhatt, was involved in a pre-tournament training camp.

At the 2009 ACC Women's Twenty20 Championship, the UAE won their first international match, defeating Oman by 49 runs. The team also defeated Kuwait, finishing fourth in its six-team group, and defeated Iran in a play-off to finish 7th overall out of 12 teams. At the 2011 ACC Women's Twenty20 Championship, it placed 9th out of 10 teams and won two matches. At the 2013 ACC Women's Championship in Thailand, the team failed to win a single game, placing 10th out of 11 teams (above Kuwait). The UAE won both editions of the Gulf Cricket Council (GCC) Women's Twenty20 Championship held in Oman in 2014 and in Qatar in 2015.

In June 2016, two teams from Australia's Women's Big Bash League (WBBL), the Sydney Sixers and the Sydney Thunder, toured UAE for a training camp. They played a Twenty20 exhibition match at the Sheikh Zayed Cricket Stadium in Dubai, and were joined by three UAE national team players (Natasha Michael, Chaya Mughal, and Esha Oza) who filled in for injured players.

In April 2018, ICC granted full Women's Twenty20 International (WT20I) status to all its members. Therefore, all Twenty20 matches played between United Arab Emirates and any international side after 1 July 2018 will be a full WT20I.

UAE was named in the 2021 ICC Women's T20 World Cup Asia Qualifier regional group alongside seven other teams.

In May 2025, the ICC announced the United Arab Emirates as one of five women's sides to gain Women's One Day International (ODI) status. Netherlands, Papua New Guinea, Scotland and Thailand are the other four teams.

== Tournament history ==
=== ICC Women's T20 World Cup Qualifier ===
T20 World Cup Qualifier record
Year	Qualification	Position	GP	W	L	T	NR
(Republic of Ireland) 2013	Did not qualify						
(Thailand) 2015	Did not qualify						
(Netherlands) 2018	DNQ	7th	3	1	2	0	0
(Scotland) 2019	Did not qualify						
(United Arab Emirates) 2022	DNQ	7th	3	1	2	0	0
(United Arab Emirates) 2024	DNQ	4th	5	2	3	0	0
(Nepal) 2026	Did not qualify						
Total	3/7	0 Titles	11	4	7	0	0

=== ICC Women's T20 World Cup Asia Qualifier ===
T20 Asia Qualifier record
Year	Round	Position	GP	W	L	T	NR
(Thailand) 2017	Qualified	2nd	5	4	1	0	0
(Thailand) 2019	Do Not Qualified	3rd	6	4	2	0	0
(United Arab Emirates) 2021	Qualified	Champion	5	5	0	0	0
(Malaysia) 2023	Qualified	Champion	5	4	0	0	1
(Thailand) 2025	DNQ	3/9	6	2	2	0	2
Total	5/5	2 Titles	27	19	6	0	3

=== ODI World Cup ===
ODI World Cup record
Year	Round	Position	GP	W	L	T	NR
(England) 1973	Did not qualify						
(India) 1978	Did not qualify						
(New Zealand) 1982	Did not qualify						
(Australia) 1988	Did not qualify						
(England) 1993	Did not qualify						
(India) 1997	Did not qualify						
(New Zealand) 2000	Did not qualify						
(South Africa) 2005	Did not qualify						
(Australia) 2009	Did not qualify						
(India) 2013	Did not qualify						
(England) 2017	Did not qualify						
(New Zealand) 2022	Did not qualify						
(India) (Sri Lanka) 2025	Did not qualify						
Total	0/12	0 Titles	0	0	0	0	0

=== T20 World Cup ===
T20 World Cup Record
Year	Round	Position	GP	W	L	T	NR
(England) 2009	Did not qualify						
(Cricket West Indies) 2010	Did not qualify						
(Sri Lanka) 2012	Did not qualify						
(Bangladesh) 2014	Did not qualify						
(India) 2016	Did not qualify						
(Cricket West Indies) 2018	Did not qualify						
(Australia) 2020	Did not qualify						
(South Africa) 2023	Did not qualify						
(United Arab Emirates) 2024	Did not qualify						
Total	0/8	0 Titles	0	0	0	0	0

=== Asia Cup ===
Asia Cup record
Year	Round	Position	GP	W	L	T	NR
2004 (Sri Lanka)	Did not enter (ODI format)						
2005/06 (Pakistan)	Did not enter (ODI format)						
2006 (India)	Did not enter (ODI format)						
2008 (Sri Lanka)	Did not enter (ODI format)						
2012 (China)	Did not qualify						
2016 (Thailand)	Did not qualify						
2018 (Malaysia)	Did not qualify						
2022 (Bangladesh)	Round robin	6th	6	1	4	1	0
2024 (Sri Lanka)	Round robin	7th	3	0	3	0	0
2026 (United Arab Emirates)	Round robin		3	0	0	0	0
Total	2/9	—	9	1	7	1	0

=== Premier Cup ===
Premier Cup record
Year	Round	Position	GP	W	L	T	NR
2024 (Malaysia)	Champion	1/16	6	6	0	0	0
2026 (Malaysia)	Runners-up	2/18	7	6	1	0	0
Total	2/2	1 Titles	13	12	1	0	0

== Records ==
International Match Summary

Last updated 18 November 2026

Playing record
Format	M	W	L	T	NR	Inaugural Match
One Day Internationals	8	4	4	0	0	26 September 2025
Twenty20 Internationals	128	80	45	1	2	7 July 2018

=== One Day International ===
ODI record versus other nations

Records complete to WODI #1508. Last updated 19 October 2025.

Opponent	M	W	L	T	NR	First match	First win
ICC Full members
Zimbabwe	4	2	2	0	0	26 September 2025	26 September 2025
ICC Associate members
Papua New Guinea	4	2	2	0	0	13 October 2025	13 October 2025

=== Twenty20 International ===
- Highest team total: 253/1 v. Bahrain on 26 March 2022 at Oman Cricket Academy Ground Turf 2, Muscat.
- Highest individual innings: 158*, Esha Oza v. Bahrain on 26 March 2022 at Oman Cricket Academy Ground Turf 2, Muscat.
- Best innings bowling: 5/3, Chamani Seneviratne v. Kuwait on 19 February 2019 at 2019 ICC Women's Qualifier Asia, Asian Institute of Technology Ground, Bangkok.

Most T20I runs for UAE Women

Player	Runs	Average	Career span
Esha Oza	3,687	35.45	2018–2026
Theertha Satish	2,449	31.39	2021–2026
Kavisha Egodage	1,947	33.56	2018–2024
Chaya Mughal	605	13.15	2018–2023
Samaira Dharnidharka	516	12.90	2019–2026

Most T20I wickets for UAE Women

Player	Wickets	Average	Career span
Vaishnave Mahesh	127	11.25	2018–2026
Esha Oza	104	14.44	2018–2026
Samaira Dharnidharka	63	15.55	2019–2026
Suraksha Kotte	53	12.58	2019–2026
Khushi Sharma	48	16.02	2021–2024
Heena Hotchandani	48	16.22	2018–2026

T20I record versus other nations

Records complete to WT20I #3079. Last updated 18 November 2026.

Opponent	M	W	L	T	NR	First match	First win
ICC Full members
Bangladesh	2	0	2	0	0	10 July 2018	
India	2	0	2	0	0	4 October 2022	
Ireland	2	0	2	0	0	25 April 2024	
Pakistan	2	0	2	0	0	9 October 2022	
Sri Lanka	4	0	4	0	0	2 October 2022	
Zimbabwe	8	5	3	0	0	12 September 2022	21 September 2022
ICC Associate members
Bahrain	3	3	0	0	0	26 March 2022	26 March 2022
Bhutan	2	2	0	0	0	25 November 2021	25 November 2021
China	4	4	0	0	0	13 January 2019	13 January 2019
Hong Kong	11	10	1	0	0	18 February 2019	18 February 2019
Indonesia	3	3	0	0	0	19 January 2019	19 January 2019
Japan	1	1	0	0	0	13 February 2024	13 February 2024
Kenya	1	1	0	0	0	18 April 2023	18 April 2023
Kuwait	5	5	0	0	0	19 February 2019	19 February 2019
Malaysia	11	11	0	0	0	15 January 2019	15 January 2019
Namibia	12	6	6	0	0	27 April 2023	26 September 2023
Nepal	6	1	4	0	1	14 January 2019	28 November 2021
Netherlands	4	2	1	1	0	7 July 2018	7 July 2018
Oman	6	5	0	0	1	22 March 2022	22 March 2022
Papua New Guinea	4	1	3	0	0	8 July 2018	18 November 2026
Philippines	1	1	0	0	0	9 June 2026	9 June 2026
Qatar	5	5	0	0	0	20 March 2022	20 March 2022
Rwanda	1	1	0	0	0	21 April 2023	21 April 2023
Saudi Arabia	3	3	0	0	0	24 March 2022	24 March 2022
Scotland	3	0	3	0	0	23 September 2022	
Singapore	1	1	0	0	0	18 June 2022	18 June 2022
Tanzania	2	1	1	0	0	19 April 2023	26 November 2025
Thailand	12	3	9	0	0	12 July 2018	9 September 2023
Uganda	4	2	2	0	0	20 April 2023	25 April 2023
United States	2	1	1	0	0	13 September 2022	25 September 2022
Vanuatu	1	1	0	0	0	3 May 2024	3 May 2024

== Current squad ==
Updated on 5 May 2024

This lists all the players who were named in the squad for 2024 ICC Women's T20 World Cup Qualifier.

Name	Age	Batting style	Bowling style	Notes
Batters
Kavisha Egodage	23	Right-handed	Right-arm off break	
Rinitha Rajith	20	Right-handed	Right-arm medium	
Lavanya Keny	19	Right-handed	Right arm off break	
Avanee Patil	19	Right-handed	Right-arm medium	
All-rounders
Esha Oza	28	Right-handed	Right-arm off break	Captain
Khushi Sharma	24	Right-handed	Right-arm medium	
Wicket-keeper
Theertha Satish	22	Left-handed		
Spin Bowlers
Vaishnave Mahesh	19	Right-handed	Right-arm leg break	
Suraksha Kotte	23	Right-handed	Right-arm off break	
Heena Hotchandani	26	Left-handed	Slow left-arm orthodox	
Mehak Thakur	25	Right-handed	Right-arm off break |	
Al Maseera Jahangir	18	Right-handed	Right-arm off break	
Pace Bowlers
Samaira Dharnidharka	19	Right-handed	Right-arm Fast	
Siya Gokhale	21	Right-handed	Right-arm medium	
Indhuja Nandakumar	20	Right-handed	Right-arm medium	

== See also ==
- List of United Arab Emirates women ODI cricketers
- List of United Arab Emirates women Twenty20 International cricketers
