= Theertha Satish =

Indian-born Emirati cricketer (born 2004)

Personal information
- Full name: Theertha Satish
- Born: 16 April 2004 (age 22); Chennai, India
- Batting: Left-handed
- Role: Wicket-keeper-batter

International information
- National side: United Arab Emirates
- ODI debut (cap 9): 26 September 2025 v Zimbabwe
- Last ODI: 28 September 2025 v Zimbabwe
- T20I debut (cap 24): 22 November 2021 v Malaysia
- Last T20I: 13 September 2024 v Zimbabwe

Career statistics
| Competition | WT20I |
|---|---|
| Matches | 75 |
| Runs scored | 1,651 |
| Batting average | 30.57 |
| 100s/50s | 0/9 |
| Top score | 93 |
| Catches/stumpings | 39/22 |
- Source: Cricinfo, 7 October 2024

Theertha Satish (born 16 April 2004) is an Indian-born cricketer who plays for the United Arab Emirates national cricket team as a left-handed top order batter and wicket-keeper.

== Early life ==
Satish was born in Chennai, India, and has lived in Dubai since she was a young child. Her mother, Rathna, is an architect, and her father, Satish Selanambi, is a finance professional.

In about 2019, Satish started playing cricket after watching Kanaa (transl. 'To dream'), a Tamil-language sports drama movie, in which the leading character tries out cricket to please her father, a farmer, and ends up taking the field for India in a World Cup. Previously, Satish had long enjoyed watching the game.

Both of Satish's parents have been fully supportive of her involvement in cricket. She and her father watch the game on television together. She is a supporter of Chennai Super Kings, and especially Ruturaj Gaikwad, one of CSK's top order batters.

== International career ==
In November 2021, Satish was named in UAE's WT20I squad for the 2021 ICC Women's T20 World Cup Asia Qualifier which was held in Dubai. On 22 November 2021, she made her Women's Twenty20 International (WT20I) debut for the UAE against Malaysia in the first match of that tournament. She top scored with 46 runs in 48 balls, and was awarded player of the match, which the UAE won by 30 runs.

Later in the tournament, from which the UAE emerged as the overall victor, Satish twice again top scored, with 64* in 53 balls against Bhutan, and 47 in 46 balls against Nepal. In the match against Bhutan, she also shared with Chamani Seneviratna in a second-wicket partnership of 131. She finished the tournament with the highest aggregate and average of any player, at 165 and 41.25, respectively.

In March 2022, Satish was selected in the UAE team for the 2022 GCC Women's Gulf Cup in Muscat, Oman. In that tournament, her highest score was 41 in 23 balls against Oman. The following month, she again turned out for the UAE, in a 4-match bilateral series against Hong Kong at the Malek Cricket Ground in Ajman. In the first match of that series, she shared with Kavisha Kumari in a partnership of 83 for the second wicket. Her top score in the series was 47 in 34 balls in the second match. In November 2022, she scored 107* in 57 balls in an Under-19 Women's T20I match against United States of America, after scoring 70 in 56 balls in the previous match of the bilateral series.

In a 2025 Women's T20 World Cup Qualifier, on 10 May 2025, she was part of the UAE team that became the first team in the history of cricket to retire out all 10 batters in a T20I game to force a decision in a match threatened by looming rain. Satish scored 74 not out in the match in an unbroken opening stand of 192 with her captain Esha Oza who made 113*.

== Domestic career ==
In May 2022, Satish was recruited to play in the privately run 2022 FairBreak Invitational T20 in Dubai. She was allocated to the Falcons team.

In October 2022, she played for UAE in Women's Twenty20 Asia Cup.

== Playing style ==
Satish has been described as "... an audacious batter, who judges length very quickly, is dangerous on the leg side, and is unafraid to hit against the spin or clear the infield."

== See also ==
- List of United Arab Emirates women Twenty20 International cricketers
