= Kavisha Egodage =

Emirati cricketer (born 2003)

Kavisha
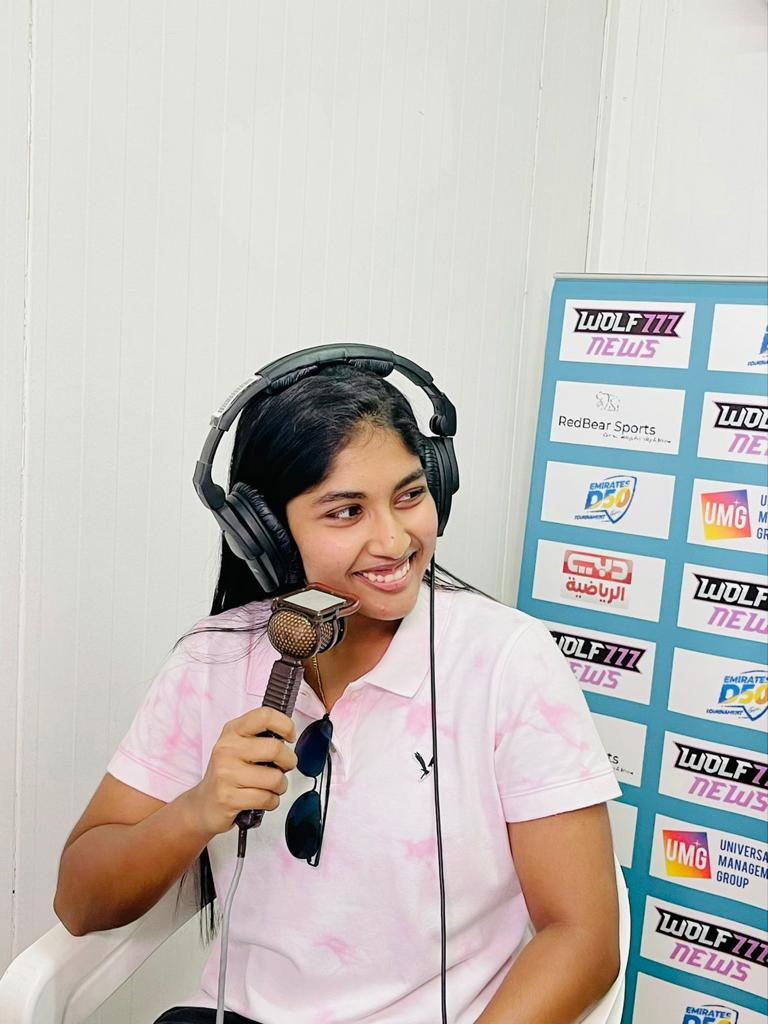

Personal information
- Full name: Kavisha Kumari Egodage
- Born: 23 April 2003 (age 23); Dubai, UAE
- Batting: Right-handed
- Bowling: Right-arm off spin
- Role: All-rounder

International information
- National side: United Arab Emirates
- T20I debut (cap 3): 7 July 2018 v Netherlands
- Last T20I: 13 September 2024 v Zimbabwe
- Source: ESPNcricinfo, 7 October 2024

Kavisha Kumari Egodage (born 23 April 2003) is a women's cricketer who plays for the United Arab Emirates national team.

== Career ==
Kumari is a right-handed batswoman and a right-arm off spin bowler. At 11 years old she was selected for the UAE Women's Team in the 2014 Gulf Cup Championship in Oman. In 2018, she was named part of that year's ICC Women's World Twenty20 Qualifier tournament and made her WT20I debut against Netherlands on 7 July 2018. In 2019 Women's Emirates Cricket Board League, she scored her maiden Century for her team.

She took part in the inaugural Fairbreak 2022 Tournament which took place in the United Arab Emirates representing the Barmy Army.

Kavisha Kumari scored an International fifty in the Thailand T20 Smash against Malaysia. It made her the youngest player to do so, breaking the record which was previously held by Sachin Tendulkar. Kumari received the 2019 Shyam Bhatia Best Female Cricketer of the Year Award and joined the Middlesex university cricket team. She played in a Red Bull University Campus Tournament.

Kumari made her first century against a boys' team as part of one of UAE's oldest tournaments. Subsequently, for 2022, she attained the highest run-scorer for Women's T20Is.

She played during the Global Qualifiers 2022 in Abu Dhabi, UAE.

In October 2022, she played in the UAE Women's Twenty20 Asia Cup.

She was part of the second edition of the Fairbreak 2023 Tournament, playing for Team Barmy Army which took part in Hong Kong where she played in Women's International. After the Fairbreak tournament, she returned to National duty in the Victoria Series which took part in Uganda where she was named the Best batter of the tournament for scoring 112 in 3 matches with an average of 56.0.

During the ICC Women's Asia Region Qualifier 2023, in the round robin games, Kumari played for the UAE, reaching the finals. Kumari collected three wickets during the final, defeating Thailand to be named Asian Champion. She became the youngest female to cross 1500 runs in the recently completed in the Namibia Series.

In the ECB U-16 boys league, she scored her career third century and her 2nd against a boys team. As the end of 2023, she made the top 5 list for the Most Runs Scored for the year in International Women's T20 as well as being the top 5 best fielder for the year 2023.
