= Samaira Dharnidharka =

Emirati cricketer (born 2007)

Personal information
- Full name: Samaira Dharnidharka
- Born: 27 February 2007 (age 19); Dubai, United Arab Emirates
- Batting: Right-handed
- Bowling: Right-arm fast
- Role: All-rounder

International information
- National side: United Arab Emirates
- ODI debut (cap 2): 26 September 2025 v Zimbabwe
- Last ODI: 28 September 2025 v Zimbabwe
- T20I debut (cap 18): 18 January 2019 v Thailand
- Last T20I: 13 September 2024 v Zimbabwe

Career statistics
Competition	WT20I
Matches	62
Runs scored	209
Batting average	8.36
100s/50s	0/0
Top score	31
Balls bowled	726
Wickets	43
Bowling average	15.69
5 wickets in innings	0
10 wickets in match	0
Best bowling	4/5
Catches/stumpings	14/0
- Source: Cricinfo, 13 September 2024

Samaira Dharnidharka (born 27 February 2007) is a women's cricketer who plays for United Arab Emirates national women's cricket team. She represented UAE in the 2022 Women's T20 World Cup Qualifier. She is one of the fastest bowler in UAE women's cricket.

In November 2021, she achieved her career-best bowling figures, with a spell of 4/5 against Nepal in the 2021 Women's T20 World Cup Asia Qualifier.

== Personal life ==
Dharnidharka's father inspired her to play cricket. She began playing cricket from the age of five. She has two sisters, one a twin and the other older to her. She along with her twin sister played cricket together, but the twin sister stopped playing later due to pursuing other interests. She idolizes Jhulan Goswami and Nat Sciver.

Dharnidharka studied at The Winchester School, Jebel Ali at Dubai. She said that she is considering a career in medicine, and her end goal is to represent her home country India.

== Career ==
Dharnidharka made her Women's Twenty20 International debut at the age of 11, against Thailand on 18 January 2019. She was the youngest international cricketer at the time of her debut, and currently the fifth-youngest. She was presented her debut cap by Chamani Seneviratne. On 28 November 2021, she achieved her maiden T20I four-wicket haul, bowling with figures of 4/5 against Nepal in the 2021 Women's T20 World Cup Asia Qualifier. At 14 years 274 days, she was then the second youngest bowler to take a four-wicket haul in Women's T20I cricket, after Bangladeshi cricketer Rabeya Khan in 2019. She was granted time off from her Year 10 studies to take part in this tournament.

In 2022, she took part in the first ever Women's T20 World Cup Qualifier as well as the first ever Women's Asia Cup for United Arab Emirates. In January 2023, she took part in the inaugural ICC Women's Under-19 T20 World Cup held in South Africa. She took a hattrick in the warm-up game against the USA U-19 Women's team, summing it to a maiden and four wickets in the over. She won Player of the Match in UAE's first game of the tournament, by scoring 23 and bowling with figures of 2/22 against Scotland. She scored 62 runs and took six wickets in the tournament.
