= Esha Oza =

Indian-born Emirati cricketer

Personal information
- Full name: Esha Rohit Oza
- Born: 8 January 1998 (age 28); Mumbai, India
- Batting: Right-handed
- Bowling: Right-arm off spin
- Role: All-rounder

International information
- National side: United Arab Emirates
- ODI debut (cap 7): 26 September 2025 v Zimbabwe
- Last ODI: 19 October 2025 v Papua New Guinea
- T20I debut (cap 7): 7 July 2018 v Netherlands
- Last T20I: 30 November 2025 v Namibia

Domestic team information
- Years: Team
- 2017/18: Desert Cubs Cricket Academy
- 2019–2021/22: Mumbai Women

Career statistics
| Competition | WT20I |
|---|---|
| Matches | 88 |
| Runs scored | 2,347 |
| Batting average | 39.88 |
| 100s/50s | 3/10 |
| Top score | 158* |
| Balls bowled | 1,220 |
| Wickets | 64 |
| Bowling average | 15.76 |
| 5 wickets in innings | 0 |
| 10 wickets in match | 0 |
| Best bowling | 3/0 |
| Catches/stumpings | 22/1 |
- Source: ESPNcricinfo, 26 November 2025

Esha Oza (born 8 January 1998) is an Indian-born cricketer who captains and plays for the United Arab Emirates national team. In July 2018, she was named in the UAE squad for the 2018 ICC Women's World Twenty20 Qualifier tournament. She made her Women's Twenty20 International (WT20I) debut for the UAE against the Netherlands in the World Twenty20 Qualifier on 7 July 2018. In July 2018, she was named in the ICC Women's Global Development Squad. Oza holds the record of the highest score by a UAE international in limited overs cricket and, as of September 2025, is the third fastest player to reach 1,000 runs in WT20Is. She reached the record when she scored 115 against Qatar at the ACC Women's Championship 2022. In January 2023, Esha Oza was named the ICC Women's Associate Player of the Year for 2022.

In a 2025 Women's T20 World Cup Qualifier, on 10 May 2025, she was part of the UAE team that became the first team in cricket history to retire out all 10 batters in a T20I game to force a decision in a match threatened by looming rain. Oza scored her fourth international T20I century in the match, an unbeaten innings of 113.

== Early and personal life ==
Oza was born in Mumbai in the state of Maharashtra, India and came to the Dubai, United Arab Emirates with her family when she was only eight months old. She is pursuing Business Management at the University of Wollongong at Dubai.

== Domestic career ==
Oza played domestic cricket at the Desert Cubs Cricket Academy and captained the winning team at the UAE National Women's Tournament in 2017. In her breakthrough season in the 2018 ECB Women's National T20 League, she made the Most Valuable Player (MVP) list being highest run-scorer as well as the joint highest wicket-taker along with hitting her maiden century. In 2018, She was the only Emirati player to be selected for the ICC Women's Global Development Squad, which toured England to play against the KIA Super League clubs.

Oza joined the Mumbai women's cricket team in 2019 and is representing the team in the domestic under-23 and senior women's tournaments in India.

== International career ==
Oza was selected in the UAE squad for the 2018 ICC Women's World Twenty20 Qualifier tournament and played her senior debut Women's Twenty20 International (WT20I) match for the UAE against the Netherlands on 7 July 2018. In May 2022 Oza was named in the Warriors Squad at the FairBreak International 2022

In October 2022, she played for UAE in Women's Twenty20 Asia Cup.
