= List of United Arab Emirates women Twenty20 International cricketers =

This is a list of United Arab Emirates women Twenty20 International cricketers. A Twenty20 International is an international cricket match between two representative teams. A Twenty20 International is played under the rules of Twenty20 cricket. In April 2018, the International Cricket Council (ICC) granted full international status to Twenty20 women's matches played between member sides from 1 July 2018 onwards. The UAE women's team made their Twenty20 International debut in a 6-wicket victory against Netherlands in Utrecht on 7 July during the 2018 ICC Women's World Twenty20 Qualifier.

The list is arranged in the order in which each player won her first Twenty20 cap. Where more than one player won her first Twenty20 cap in the same match, those players are listed alphabetically by surname.

== Key ==
General

- ‡ – Captain
- † – Wicket-keeper
- First – Year of debut
- Last – Year of latest game
- Mat – Number of matches played

Batting

- Runs – Runs scored in career
- HS – Highest score
- 50 – Number of half-centuries scored
- 100 – Centuries scored
- Avg – Runs scored per dismissal
- * – Batsman remained not out

Bowling

- Wkt – Wickets taken in career
- BBI – Best bowling in an innings
- Ave – Average runs per wicket

Fielding

- Ca – Catches taken
- St – Stumpings affected

== Players ==
Statistics are correct as of 8 September 2026.

General					Batting					Bowling				Fielding		Ref
No.	Name	First	Last	Mat	Runs	HS	Avg	50	100	Balls	Wkt	BBI	Ave	Ca	St	Ref
1	Chaya Mughal‡†	2018	2023	66	605	52	13.15	1	0	1,120	46	3/4	18.30	19	4	
2	Udeni Dona	2018	2025	33	133	26*	8.86	0	0	–	–	–	–	5	0	
3	Kavisha Egodage	2018	2024	88	1,947	92*	33.56	9	0	824	43	3/3	16.04	38	0	
4	Heena Hotchandani	2018	2026	51	386	32	12.06	0	0	912	47	4/8	14.89	17	0	
5	Humaira Tasneem‡	2018	2019	16	49	11	4.90	0	0	86	10	2/6	9.20	7	0	
6	Nisha Ali	2018	2018	5	115	69	23.00	1	0	82	2	1/7	35.00	1	0	
7	Esha Oza‡†	2018	2026	120	3,453	158*	34.18	14	5	1,751	102	3/0	14.13	32	1	
8	Judit Peter†	2018	2023	12	10	5	5.00	0	0	–	–	–	–	3	7	
9	Roopa Nagraj	2018	2018	3	10	10	5.00	0	0	30	1	1/16	26.00	1	0	
10	Chamani Seneviratne (Note: Chamani Seneviratne also played WT20I matches for Sri Lanka. Only her record for United Arab Emirates is given above.)	2018	2022	23	369	63	19.42	2	0	424	28	5/3	10.07	5	0	
11	Shubha Venkataraman	2018	2022	18	67	22	6.70	0	0	348	21	3/2	11.19	5	0	
12	Neha Sharma	2018	2019	13	32	12	4.57	0	0	6	1	1/2	2.00	2	0	
13	Namita D'souza	2018	2019	10	47	26	6.71	0	0	318	8	3/20	15.12	3	0	
14	Ishni Mananelage	2018	2018	7	16	7	5.33	0	0	24	3	3/0	6.66	1	0	
15	Charvi Bhatt	2019	2019	5	1	1	1.00	0	0	–	–	–	–	0	0	
16	Vaishnave Mahesh	2019	2026	104	128	16	5.12	0	0	1,798	127	4/10	11.25	27	0	
17	Suraksha Kotte	2019	2026	64	25	9	6.25	0	0	904	49	4/11	12.36	10	0	
18	Samaira Dharnidharka	2019	2026	87	486	85*	13.50	1	0	1031	60	4/5	14.98	19	0	
19	Mahika Gaur (Note: Mahika Gaur also played WT20I matches for England. Only her record for United Arab Emirates is given above.)	2019	2022	19	11	6*	5.50	0	0	354	9	3/21	33.77	4	0	
20	Ishani Seneviratne	2019	2019	6	17	6*	8.50	0	0	–	–	–	–	1	0	
21	Natasha Cherriath	2021	2022	16	94	27*	11.75	0	0	37	1	1/16	58.00	1	0	
22	Priyanjali Jain†	2021	2022	17	15	5	2.14	0	0	–	–	–	–	7	2	
23	Khushi Sharma	2021	2024	68	450	37*	11.84	0	0	838	48	5/22	16.02	11	0	
24	Theertha Satish†	2021	2026	107	2,394	93	32.35	13	0	–	–	–	–	52	36	
25	Siya Gokhale	2022	2025	41	19	8*	3.80	0	0	144	8	3/14	15.50	5	0	
26	Lavanya Keny	2022	2026	62	271	42	8.46	0	0	90	11	4/3	5.45	12	0	
27	Rinitha Rajith	2022	2026	69	472	96	11.51	1	0	12	1	1/7	7.00	14	0	
28	Indhuja Nandakumar	2022	2026	66	46	13*	4.60	0	0	988	38	4/10	21.34	6	0	
29	Rithika Rajith	2022	2024	10	13	6*	6.50	0	0	24	0	–	–	1	0	
30	Sanchin Singh†	2022	2023	8	26	23	6.50	–	–	–	–	–	–	3	3	
31	Archara Supriya	2023	2026	15	6	2*	3.00	0	0	141	9	2/9	14.11	4	0	
32	Avanee Patil	2023	2023	16	17	16	8.50	0	0	–	–	–	–	6	0	
33	Geethika Jyothis	2023	2023	1	11	11	11.00	0	0	–	–	–	–	0	0	
34	Rishitha Rajith	2023	2024	3	–	–	–	–	–	6	0	–	–	0	0	
35	Al Maseera Jahangir	2023	2025	10	13	5	3.25	0	0	43	2	1/1	9.50	1	0	
36	Mehak Thakur	2024	2025	10	1	1*	–	0	0	28	3	2/0	5.66	4	0	
37	Keziah Miriam Sabin	2024	2025	18	88	54*	22.00	1	0	–	–	–	–	0	0	
38	Michelle Botha	2025	2025	22	177	45	17.70	0	0	403	30	4/6	8.93	3	0	
39	Athige Silva	2025	2026	21	12	6	2.40	0	0	186	11	4/6	15.09	2	0	
40	Katie Thompson	2025	2026	19	6	4*	3.00	0	0	299	15	4/7	11.80	6	0	
41	Mehul Kulkarni	2026	2026	10	14	9*	7.00	0	0	–	–	–	–	1	0	
42	Janani Thirukkumaran	2026	2026	4	6	6	6.00	0	0	18	1	1/5	13.00	2	0	
43	Simran Seth	2026	2026	1	–	–	–	–	–	12	1	1/13	13.00	0	0	
