= 2025 GCC Women's Gulf Cup =

International cricket tournament

- Dates: 12 – 19 December 2025
- Administrator: Gulf Cooperation Council
- Cricket format: Twenty20 International
- Tournament format(s): Round-robin and final
- Host: Oman
- Champions: United Arab Emirates (4th title)
- Runners-up: Oman
- Participants: 6
- Matches: 16
- Most runs: (United Arab Emirates) Esha Oza (250)
- Most wickets: (United Arab Emirates) Esha Oza (10)

The 2025 GCC Women's Gulf Cup was a Twenty20 International (T20I) cricket tournament that was played in Oman from 12 to 19 December 2025. Organised by the Gulf Cooperation Council (GCC), the tournament featured the women's national teams of Oman, Bahrain, Kuwait, Qatar, Saudi Arabia and United Arab Emirates.

This was the fifth edition of the women's Gulf Cup. The previous edition, played in 2022, was the first edition where the matches had T20I status.

== Squads ==
Bahrain	Kuwait	Oman	Qatar	Saudi Arabia	United Arab Emirates
Deepika Rasangika (c); Sadamali Bhakshala; Sana Butt (wk); Sweeta Corda; Reshel D'Souza; Tharanga Gajanayake; Poorvaja Jagdeesha (wk); Nipuni Nadeera; Swarna Nunna; Sudeshika Ranawaka; Rasika Rodrigo; Eman Shahzadi; Pavithra Shetty; Ishara Suhun	Amna Tariq (c); Candice Dias; Suchitha D'Sa (wk); Venora D'Souza; Mariamma Hyder; Maria Jasvi; Zeefa Jilani; Khadija Khalil; Priyada Murali; Maryam Omar; Balasubramani Shanti; Tshering Yangchen; Bhavani Yekkeli; Sabreen Zaki	Priyanka Mendonca (c); Fiza Javed (vc); Afida Afthab; Amanda Dcosta; Jayadhanyha Gunasekar; Hina Javed; Sahana Jeelany (wk); Nitya Joshi; Sameera Khan; Lujaina; Trupti Pawde; Cynthia Saldanha (wk); Sushanthika Sathiya; Alifiya Sayed	Aysha (c); Amna Kashif; Sarrinah Ahmed; Roheed Akhtar; Lihara Ayeysekara; Shahreen Bahadur; Getrude Chandiru; Taful Elkhair; Khadija Imtiaz; Christeena Jacob; Maria Jacob; Krisheta Sarvanakumar (wk); Sargam Patel; Shrutiben Rana (wk)	Mashael Waqas (c); Mah Noor Aamir; Fatima Abbas; Najwa Akram; Nimra Ghazanfar (wk); Ashmal Hashmi; Abeer Maryam; Simrah Mirza (wk); Rumaisa Jawad Nasir; Laiba Nasrullah; Mah Noor; Sara; Usrah Umar Farooq; Aridah Umer Farooq (wk)	Esha Oza (c); Michelle Botha; Samaira Dharnidharka; Udeni Dona; Siya Gokhale; Al Maseera Jahangir; Vaishnave Mahesh; Keziah Miriam Sabin; Indhuja Nandakumar; Rinitha Rajith; Theertha Satish (wk); Athige Silva; Mehak Thakur; Katie Thompson

== Round-robin ==
=== Points table ===
Pos	Team	Pld	W	L	NR	Pts	NRR
1	United Arab Emirates	5	5	0	0	10	8.517
2	Oman	5	4	1	0	8	2.357
3	Kuwait	5	3	2	0	6	1.042
4	Qatar	5	2	3	0	4	−1.220
5	Bahrain	5	1	4	0	2	−2.099
6	Saudi Arabia	5	0	5	0	0	−8.384

Source: ESPNcricinfo

=== Fixtures ===
12 December 2025
09:30
Scorecard

Kuwait; 160/5 (20 overs)	v	Qatar; 92 (16.2 overs)
Zeefa Jilani 71 (54); Maria Jacob 2/23 (4 overs)		Aysha 33 (30); Zeefa Jilani 2/8 (2 overs)

Kuwait won by 68 runs
Oman Cricket Academy Ground Turf 1, Muscat
Umpires: Rabab Ahsan (UAE) and Rahat Ali (Sau)
Player of the match: Zeefa Jilani (Kuw)

- Qatar won the toss and elected to field.
- Tshering Yangchen made her T20I debut for Kuwait after previously playing 3 T20Is for Bhutan, becoming the sixth women's cricketer to represent two international teams in T20Is.

12 December 2025
14:00
Scorecard

Oman; 63 (19.1 overs)	v	United Arab Emirates; 65/0 (5.4 overs)
Sameera Khan 12 (20); Esha Oza 3/6 (4 overs)		Esha Oza 43* (18)

United Arab Emirates won by 10 wickets
Oman Cricket Academy Ground Turf 1, Muscat
Umpires: Ridwan Parkar (Kuw) and Muhammad Usman (Qat)
Player of the match: Esha Oza (UAE)

- Oman won the toss and elected to bat.

12 December 2025
18:30 (N)
Scorecard

Bahrain; 196/3 (20 overs)	v	Saudi Arabia; 89/9 (20 overs)
Deepika Rasangika 107* (66); Laiba Nasrullah 1/22 (4 overs)		Mashael Waqas 36* (49); Deepika Rasangika 3/19 (3 overs)

Bahrain won by 107 runs
Oman Cricket Academy Ground Turf 1, Muscat
Umpires: Rabab Ahsan (UAE) and Gopakumar Pillai (Oma)
Player of the match: Deepika Rasangika (Bhr)

- Kuwait won the toss and elected to field.
- Nimra Ghazanfar, Ashmal Hashmi, Laiba Nasrullah, Rumaisa Jawad Nasir, Mah Noor, Mashael Waqas and Sara (Sau) all made their T20I debuts.

13 December 2025
09:30
Scorecard

United Arab Emirates; 183/5 (20 overs)	v	Qatar; 47 (18.4 overs)
Rinitha Rajith 96 (52); Maria Jacob 3/25 (4 overs)		Maria Jacob 8 (24); Indhuja Nandakumar 3/8 (4 overs)

United Arab Emirates won by 136 runs
Oman Cricket Academy Ground Turf 1, Muscat
Umpires: Meera Bhanushali (Oma) and Ridwan Parkar (Kuw)
Player of the match: Rinitha Rajith (UAE)

- United Arab Emirates won the toss and elected to bat.

13 December 2025
14:00
Scorecard

Oman; 203/3 (20 overs)	v	Saudi Arabia; 36 (18.4 overs)
Jayadhanyha Gunasekar 66 (43); Rumaisa Jawad Nasir 1/26 (3 overs)		Mashael Waqas 12 (25); Amanda D'Costa 3/4 (4 overs)

Oman won by 167 runs
Oman Cricket Academy Ground Turf 1, Muscat
Umpires: Arfan Ghani (Bhr) and Muhammad Usman (Qat)
Player of the match: Jayadhanyha Gunasekar (Oma)

- Oman won the toss and elected to bat.
- Usrah Umar Farooq (Sau) made her T20I debut.

13 December 2025
18:30 (N)
Scorecard

Bahrain; 108/3 (20 overs)	v	Kuwait; 109/3 (12.5 overs)
Deepika Rasangika 36* (29); Priyada Murali 1/10 (2.5 overs)		Zeefa Jilani 48 (29); Sudeshika Ranawaka 2/19 (2.5 overs)

Kuwait won by 7 wickets
Oman Cricket Academy Ground Turf 1, Muscat
Umpires: Rabab Ahsan (UAE) and Rahat Ali (Sau)
Player of the match: Zeefa Jilani (Kuw)

- Bahrain won the toss and elected to bat.

15 December 2025
09:30
Scorecard

Bahrain; 96/7 (20 overs)	v	Oman; 97/1 (12.2 overs)
Deepika Rasangika 46 (47); Alifiya Sayed 3/22 (4 overs)		Nitya Joshi 49 (36); Deepika Rasangika 1/8 (1 over)

Oman won by 9 wickets
Oman Cricket Academy Ground Turf 1, Muscat
Umpires: Ridwan Parkar (Kuw) and Muhammad Usman (Qat)
Player of the match: Nitya Joshi (Oma)

- Oman won the toss and elected to field.

15 December 2025
14:00
Scorecard

Saudi Arabia; 64/8 (20 overs)	v	Qatar; 66/1 (8 overs)
Fatima Abbas 16 (35); Aysha 3/10 (4 overs)		Aysha 26* (15); Mah Noor Aamir 1/17 (2 overs)

Qatar won by 9 wickets
Oman Cricket Academy Ground Turf 1, Muscat
Umpires: Rabab Ahsan (UAE) and Arfan Ghani (Bhr)
Player of the match: Aysha (Qat)

- Saudi Arabia won the toss and elected to bat.
- Fatima Abbas and Aridah Umer Farooq (Sau) both made their T20I debuts.

15 December 2025
18:30 (N)
Scorecard

Kuwait; 26 (12.5 overs)	v	United Arab Emirates; 27/1 (3.5 overs)
Amna Tariq 5 (17); Michelle Botha 4/6 (3 overs)		Esha Oza 13 (8); Tshering Yangchen 1/5 (1 over)

United Arab Emirates won by 9 wickets
Oman Cricket Academy Ground Turf 1, Muscat
Umpires: Meera Bhanushali (Oma) and Gopakumar Pillai (Oma)
Player of the match: Michelle Botha (UAE)

- United Arab Emirates won the toss and elected to field.

16 December 2025
09:30
Scorecard

Qatar; 138/6 (20 overs)	v	Bahrain; 90 (19 overs)
Aysha 41 (25); Tharanga Gajanayake 1/16 (4 overs)		Pavithra Shetty 21* (31); Getrude Chandiru 2/12 (4 overs)

Qatar won by 48 runs
Oman Cricket Academy Ground Turf 1, Muscat
Umpires: Rahat Ali (Sau) and Ridwan Parkar (Kuw)
Player of the match: Aysha (Qat)

- Bahrain won the toss and elected to field.

16 December 2025
14:00
Scorecard

United Arab Emirates; 251/2 (20 overs)	v	Saudi Arabia; 13 (9.4 overs)
Samaira Dharnidharka 85* (52); Najwa Akram 1/44 (4 overs); Mah Noor Aamir 1/44 (4 overs)		Ashmal Hashmi 4 (5); Athige Silva 4/6 (4 overs)

United Arab Emirates won by 238 runs
Oman Cricket Academy Ground Turf 1, Muscat
Umpires: Arfan Ghani (Bhr) and Muhammad Usman (Qat)
Player of the match: Samaira Dharnidharka (UAE)

- United Arab Emirates won the toss and elected to bat.

16 December 2025
18:30 (N)
Scorecard

Kuwait; 85/9 (20 overs)	v	Oman; 86/1 (12.4 overs)
Zeefa Jilani 22 (19); Priyanka Mendonca 4/18 (4 overs)		Jayadhanyha Gunasekar 41* (41); Candice Dias 1/20 (3 overs)

Oman won by 9 wickets
Oman Cricket Academy Ground Turf 1, Muscat
Umpires: Rabab Ahsan (UAE) and Rahat Ali (Sau)
Player of the match: Priyanka Mendonca (Oma)

- Oman won the toss and elected to field.

18 December 2025
09:30
Scorecard

Saudi Arabia; 20 (12 overs)	v	Kuwait; 21/0 (1.3 overs)
Laiba Nasrullah 2* (13); Maryam Omar 3/4 (4 overs)		Zeefa Jilani 10* (4)

Kuwait won by 10 wickets
Oman Cricket Academy Ground Turf 1, Muscat
Umpires: Rabab Ahsan (UAE) and Muhammad Usman (Qat)
Player of the match: Maryam Omar (Kuw)

- Saudi Arabia won the toss and elected to bat.

18 December 2025
14:00
Scorecard

United Arab Emirates; 198/1 (20 overs)	v	Bahrain; 41 (16 overs)
Esha Oza 102* (68)		Sweeta Corda 9* (21); Samaira Dharnidharka 3/7 (2 overs)

United Arab Emirates won by 157 runs
Oman Cricket Academy Ground Turf 1, Muscat
Umpires: Ridwan Parkar (Kuw) and Gopakumar Pillai (Oma)
Player of the match: Esha Oza (UAE)

- United Arab Emirates won the toss and elected to bat.
- Samaira Dharnidharka (UAE) took her second hat-trick in T20Is.

18 December 2025
18:30 (N)
Scorecard

Qatar; 97/9 (20 overs)	v	Oman; 98/4 (15.4 overs)
Shrutiben Rana 39 (44); Afida Afthab 2/11 (3 overs)		Priyanka Mendonca 37* (44); Maria Jacob 1/15 (2 overs)

Oman won by 6 wickets
Oman Cricket Academy Ground Turf 1, Muscat
Umpires: Rahat Ali (Sau) and Arfan Ghani (Bhr)
Player of the match: Jayadhanyha Gunasekar (Oma)

- Oman won the toss and elected to field.

== Final ==
19 December 2025
18:30 (N)
Scorecard

Oman; 84/7 (20 overs)	v	United Arab Emirates; 85/1 (12.3 overs)
Fiza Javed 17 (29); Katie Thompson 2/10 (4 overs)		Samaira Dharnidharka 38* (32); Priyanka Mendonca 1/26 (4 overs)

United Arab Emirates won by 9 wickets
Oman Cricket Academy Ground Turf 1, Muscat
Umpires: Rahat Ali (Sau) and Ridwan Parkar (Kuw)

- United Arab Emirates won the toss and elected to field.
