= List of centuries in women's Twenty20 International cricket =

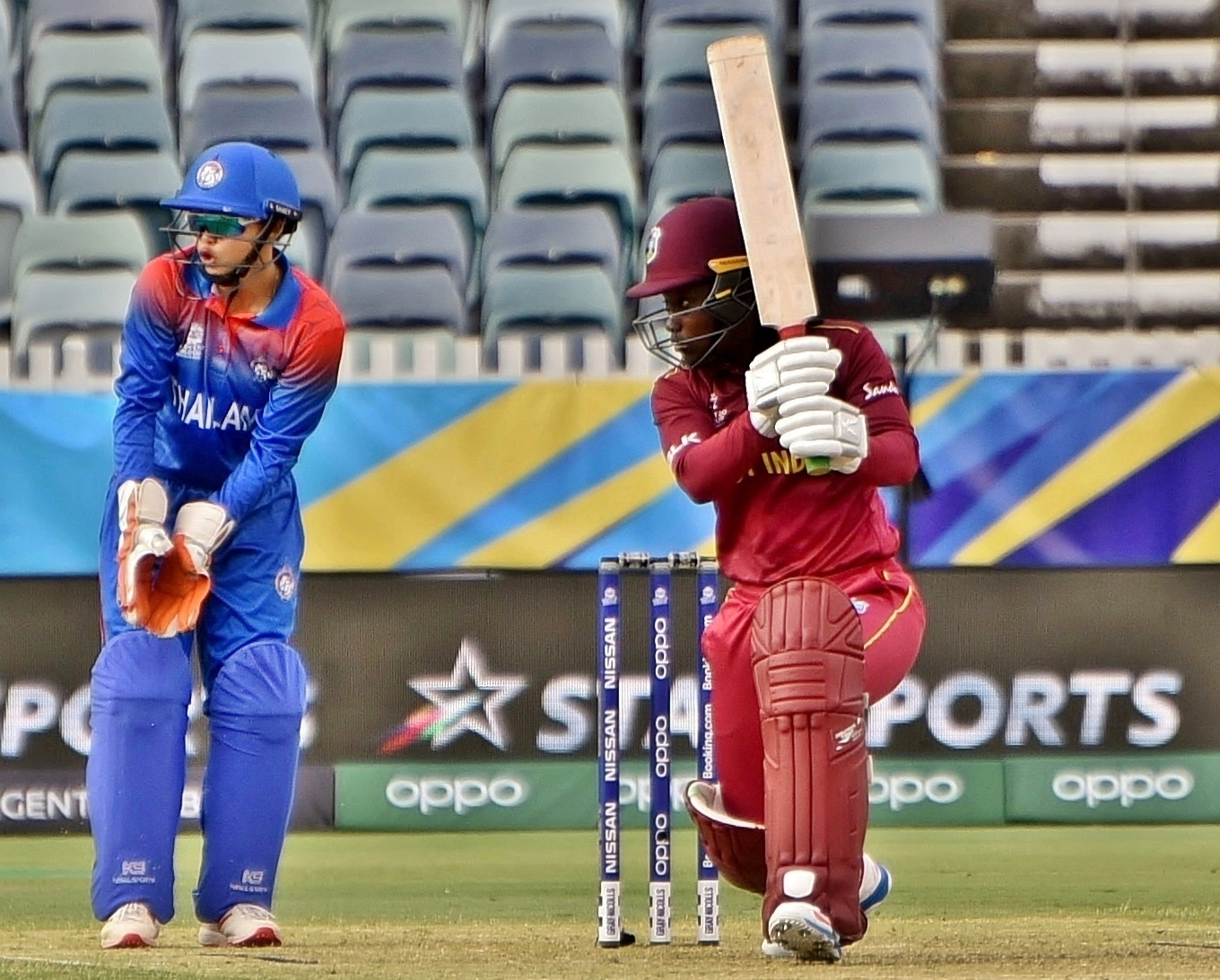
Deandra Dottin was the first player to score a century in a WT20I match.

In the sport of cricket, a century is a score of one hundred or more runs by a batter in a single innings. In a women's Twenty20 match, each team plays a single innings, which is restricted to a maximum of 20 overs. A women's Twenty20 International (WT20I) is an international cricket match between two teams, each having WT20I status, as determined by the International Cricket Council (ICC), the sport's world governing body. The Twenty20 format was originally introduced by the England and Wales Cricket Board for the men's county cricket competition, with the first matches contested on 13 June 2003 between the English counties in the Twenty20 Cup. The first women's Twenty20 International match took place on 5 August 2004 when New Zealand defeated England by nine runs at the County Cricket Ground in Hove. This match was held six months before the first men's Twenty20 International, which was contested between Australia and New Zealand in February 2005.

The first century in a WT20I match was scored by Deandra Dottin of the West Indies. Dottin posted 112 not out against South Africa in the opening match of the 2010 ICC Women's World Twenty20 at Warner Park in Basseterre. Dottin's innings remains the fastest WT20I century (off 38 deliveries), and is the WT20I century with the highest strike rate (248.88). Batting at number six, Dottin's innings is one of two occasions where a WT20I century has been scored by a player batting at number five or lower. The other was when India's Harmanpreet Kaur, who came in at number five, posted 103 against New Zealand during the 2018 ICC Women's World Twenty20.

Esha Oza of the United Arab Emirates has scored 5 WT20I centuries, the record. Chamari Athapaththu of Sri Lanka and Laura Wolvaardt of South Africa follow with 4 centuries each. Rebecca Blake of Romania, Fatuma Kibasu of Tanzania, Hayley Matthews of the West Indies and Danni Wyatt-Hodge of England have three centuries each. Wyatt-Hodge's first two WT20I centuries were scored in the second innings of the match; two of only six instances of centuries in the second innings. There have been only three occurrences where a team was defeated in spite of a player scoring a century, and seven occasions where two WT20I centuries were scored in the same match.

The highest individual score of 169 in WT20Is was achieved by Lucia Taylor of Argentina. At 41 years and 364 days, Bahrain's Deepika Rasangika scored 107 not out against Saudi Arabia in December 2025 and became the oldest player to score a WT20I century. At the age of 15 years and 223 days, Rwanda's Fanny Utagushimaninde became the youngest player to score a WT20I century when she made 116 against Ghana in 2026. The only woman to have scored back-to-back T20I centuries is Maria Castiñeiras for Argentina against Chile in October 2023.

As of September 2026, a total of 92 centuries have been scored by 62 different players from 33 national teams after over 3,000 WT20I matches. (Note: The ICC granted full women's Twenty20 International status to all its members on 1 July 2018.)

== Key ==
Key
Symbol	Meaning
Player	The batter who scored the century
†	The batter was named player of the match
Runs	Number of runs scored
*	Batter remained not out
Balls	Number of balls faced
4s	Number of fours scored
6s	Number of sixes scored
S/R	Strike rate (runs scored per 100 balls)
Inn.	Innings in which the score was made
Team	The team the batter was representing
Opposition	The team the batter was playing against
Venue	The cricket ground where the match was played
Date	The date when the match was played
Result	Result for the team for which the century was scored
DLS	The result was decided by the Duckworth–Lewis–Stern method
	Light blue background indicates this happened during a Women's T20 World Cup match.

== Centuries ==
List of centuries in women's Twenty20 International cricket
No.	Player	Runs	Balls	4s	6s	S/R	Inn.	Team	Opposition	Venue	Date	Result	Ref.
1	Deandra Dottin † (1/2)	112*	45	7	9	248.88	1	West Indies	South Africa	Warner Park, Basseterre	5 May 2010	Won	
2	Shandre Fritz †	116*	71	12	2	163.38	1	South Africa	Netherlands	Absa Puk Oval, Potchefstroom	14 October 2010	Won	
3	Meg Lanning † (1/2)	126	65	18	4	193.84	1	Australia	Ireland	Sylhet International Cricket Stadium, Sylhet	27 March 2014	Won	
4	Deandra Dottin † (2/2)	112	67	9	5	167.16	1	West Indies	Sri Lanka	Coolidge Cricket Ground, St George	22 October 2017	Won	
5	Beth Mooney (1/2)	117*	70	19	1	167.14	1	Australia	England	Manuka Oval, Canberra	21 November 2017	Lost	
6	Danni Wyatt-Hodge † (1/3)	100	57	13	2	175.43	2	England	Australia	Manuka Oval, Canberra	21 November 2017	Won	
7	Danni Wyatt-Hodge † (2/3)	124	64	15	5	193.75	2	England	India	Brabourne Stadium, Mumbai	25 March 2018	Won	
8	Suzie Bates †	124*	66	16	3	187.87	1	New Zealand	South Africa	County Ground, Taunton	20 June 2018	Won	
9	Tammy Beaumont †	116	52	18	4	223.07	1	England	South Africa	County Ground, Taunton	20 June 2018	Won	
10	Harmanpreet Kaur †	103	51	7	8	201.96	1	India	New Zealand	Providence Stadium, Providence	9 November 2018	Won	
11	Hayley Matthews (Note: No player of the match was awarded.) (1/3)	107*	62	7	9	172.58	1	West Indies	Ireland	Sydney Parade, Dublin	29 May 2019	Won	
12	Prosscovia Alako † (1/2)	116	71	15	0	163.38	1	Uganda	Mali	Rwanda Cricket Stadium, Kigali	20 June 2019	Won	
13	Rita Musamali	103*	61	15	0	168.85	1	Uganda	Mali	Rwanda Cricket Stadium, Kigali	20 June 2019	Won	
14	Marie Bimenyimana †	114*	81	13	0	140.74	1	Rwanda	Mali	Rwanda Cricket Stadium, Kigali	21 June 2019	Won	
15	Fatuma Kibasu † (1/3)	108*	71	8	0	152.11	1	Tanzania	Mali	Rwanda Cricket Stadium, Kigali	22 June 2019	Won	
16	Sterre Kalis	126*	76	10	5	165.78	1	Netherlands	Germany	La Manga Club Ground, Cartagena	27 June 2019	Won	
17	Meg Lanning † (2/2)	133*	63	17	7	211.11	1	Australia	England	County Cricket Ground, Chelmsford	26 July 2019	Won	
18	Beth Mooney † (2/2)	113	61	20	0	185.24	1	Australia	Sri Lanka	North Sydney Oval, Sydney	29 September 2019	Won	
19	Chamari Athapaththu (1/4)	113	66	12	6	171.21	2	Sri Lanka	Australia	North Sydney Oval, Sydney	29 September 2019	Lost	
20	Alyssa Healy †	148*	61	19	7	242.62	1	Australia	Sri Lanka	North Sydney Oval, Sydney	2 October 2019	Won	
21	Nigar Sultana †	113*	65	14	3	173.84	1	Bangladesh	Maldives	Pokhara Stadium, Pokhara	5 December 2019	Won	
22	Fargana Hoque	110*	53	20	0	207.54	1	Bangladesh	Maldives	Pokhara Stadium, Pokhara	5 December 2019	Won	
23	Yulia Anggraeni	112	68	19	0	164.70	1	Indonesia	Philippines	Friendship Oval, Dasmariñas	21 December 2019	Won	
24	Sophie Devine	105	65	12	3	161.53	1	New Zealand	South Africa	Basin Reserve, Wellington	10 February 2020	Won	
25	Heather Knight †	108*	66	13	4	163.63	1	England	Thailand	Manuka Oval, Canberra	26 February 2020	Won	
26	Lizelle Lee †	101	60	16	3	168.33	1	South Africa	Thailand	Manuka Oval, Canberra	28 February 2020	Won	
27	Janet Ronalds †	105*	74	16	0	141.89	1	Germany	Austria	Seebarn Cricket Ground, Lower Austria	13 August 2020	Won	
28	Christina Gough †	101*	70	13	0	144.28	1p	Germany	Austria	Seebarn Cricket Ground, Lower Austria	14 August 2020	Won	
29	Gaby Lewis † (1/2)	105*	60	11	3	175.00	1	Ireland	Germany	La Manga Club Ground, Cartagena	26 August 2021	Won	
30	Gisele Ishimwe †	114*	69	12	0	165.21	1	Rwanda	Eswatini	Botswana Cricket Association Oval 1, Gaborone	12 September 2021	Won	
31	Fatuma Kibasu † (2/3)	127*	66	19	0	192.42	1	Tanzania	Eswatini	Botswana Cricket Association Oval 1, Gaborone	14 September 2021	Won	
32	Andrea-Mae Zepeda †	101	63	17	0	160.31	1	Austria	Belgium	Seebarn Cricket Ground, Lower Austria	25 September 2021	Won	
33	Deepika Rasangika † (1/2)	161*	66	31	0	243.93	1	Bahrain	Saudi Arabia	Oman Cricket Academy Ground Turf 2, Muscat	22 March 2022	Won	
34	Aysha	113*	58	19	0	194.83	1	Qatar	Saudi Arabia	Oman Cricket Academy Ground Turf 1, Muscat	25 March 2022	Won	
35	Shahreen Bahadur	104*	61	17	0	170.49	1	Qatar	Saudi Arabia	Oman Cricket Academy Ground Turf 1, Muscat	25 March 2022	Won	
36	Esha Oza † (1/5)	158*	71	22	6	222.53	1	United Arab Emirates	Bahrain	Oman Cricket Academy Ground Turf 2, Muscat	26 March 2022	Won	
37	Esha Oza † (2/5)	115	67	18	3	171.64	1	United Arab Emirates	Qatar	Kinrara Academy Oval, Bandar Kinrara	22 June 2022	Won	
38	Rebecca Blake † (1/3)	110*	61	17	0	180.32	1	Romania	Serbia	Moara Vlasiei Cricket Ground, Ilfov County	10 September 2022	Won	
39	Fatuma Kibasu † (3/3)	101*	62	13	0	162.90	1	Tanzania	Qatar	Gymkhana Club Ground, Nairobi	18 December 2022	Won	
40	Muneeba Ali † (1/2)	102	68	14	0	150	1	Pakistan	Ireland	Newlands, Cape Town	15 February 2023	Won	
41	Rebecca Blake † (2/3)	135*	76	24	0	177.63	1	Romania	Malta	Moara Vlasiei Cricket Ground, Ilfov County	5 August 2023	Won	
42	Queentor Abel †	109*	52	16	1	209.61	1	Kenya	Lesotho	Botswana Cricket Association Oval 2, Gaborone	5 September 2023	Won	
43	Hayley Matthews † (2/3)	132	64	20	5	206.25	2	West Indies	Australia	North Sydney Oval, Sydney	2 October 2023	Won	
44	Lucia Taylor †	169	84	27	0	201.19	1	Argentina	Chile	St Albans Club, Buenos Aires	13 October 2023	Won	
45	Albertina Galan	145*	84	23	0	172.61	1	Argentina	Chile	St Albans Club, Buenos Aires	13 October 2023	Won	
46	Maria Castiñeiras (1/2)	105	56	13	1	187.50	1	Argentina	Chile	St Albans Club, Buenos Aires	14 October 2023	Won	
47	Veronica Vasquez	107*	67	11	0	159.70	1	Argentina	Chile	St Albans Club, Buenos Aires	15 October 2023	Won	
48	Maria Castiñeiras (2/2)	155*	77	26	0	201.29	1	Argentina	Chile	St Albans Club, Buenos Aires	15 October 2023	Won	
49	Rachel Andrew	106*	68	12	0	155.88	1	Vanuatu	Cook Islands	Lloyd Elsmore Park 1, Auckland	19 January 2024	Won	
50	Amy Hunter †	101*	66	13	1	153.03	1	Ireland	Zimbabwe	Harare Sports Club, Harare	26 January 2024	Won	
51	Esha Oza † (3/5)	114*	69	14	2	165.21	1	United Arab Emirates	Oman	Royal Selangor Club, Kuala Lumpur	11 February 2024	Won	
52	Mariko Hill (1/2)	100*	65	12	1	153.84	1	Hong Kong	Maldives	Bayuemas Oval, Pandamaran	11 February 2024	Won	
53	Rubina Chhetry †	118*	59	10	5	200	1	Nepal	Maldives	UKM-YSD Cricket Oval, Bangi	13 February 2024	Won	
54	Laura Wolvaardt † (1/4)	102	63	12	3	161.90	1	South Africa	Sri Lanka	Willowmoore Park, Benoni	27 March 2024	Won	
55	Chamari Athapaththu † (2/4)	102	63	13	4	161.90	1	Sri Lanka	Scotland	Sheikh Zayed Cricket Stadium, Abu Dhabi	7 May 2024	Won	
56	Prosscovia Alako † (2/2)	100	63	9	5	158.73	1	Uganda	Cameroon	Gahanga International Cricket Stadium, Kigali	7 June 2024	Won	
57	Chamari Athapaththu † (3/4)	119*	69	14	7	172.46	1	Sri Lanka	Malaysia	Rangiri Dambulla International Stadium, Dambulla	22 July 2024	Won	
58	Gaby Lewis † (2/2)	119	75	17	2	158.66	1	Ireland	Sri Lanka	Sydney Parade, Dublin	13 August 2024	Won	
59	Laura Agatha	144*	71	11	11	202.81	1	Brazil	Mexico	Pocos Oval, Poços de Caldas	26 September 2024	Won	
60	Mariko Hill † (2/2)	106	66	14	4	160.60	1	Hong Kong	China	Mission Road Ground, Mong Kok	4 December 2024	Won	
61	Esha Oza † (4/5)	113	55	14	5	205.45	1	United Arab Emirates	Qatar	Terdthai Cricket Ground, Bangkok	10 May 2025	Won	
62	Hayley Matthews † (3/3)	100*	67	16	1	149.25	1	West Indies	England	St Lawrence Ground, Canterbury	21 May 2025	Lost	
63	Smriti Mandhana † (1/2)	112	62	15	3	180.64	1	India	England	Trent Bridge, Nottingham	28 June 2025	Won	
64	Muneeba Ali † (2/2)	100*	68	14	1	147.05	2	Pakistan	Ireland	Castle Avenue, Clontarf	10 August 2025	Won	
65	Heather Siegers †	106*	55	18	0	192.72	1	Netherlands	Germany	Hazelaarweg Stadium, Rotterdam	23 August 2025	Won	
66	Amy Hunter † (2/2)	114*	67	17	0	170.14	1	Ireland	Germany	Hazelaarweg Stadium, Rotterdam	24 August 2025	Won	
67	Konio Oala †	124*	66	22	2	187.87	1	Papua New Guinea	Philippines	Albert Park Ground 1, Suva	10 September 2025	Won	
68	Rebecca Blake † (3/3)	120*	80	16	0	150.00	1	Romania	Bulgaria	Moara Vlasei Cricket Ground, Ilfov County	10 October 2025	Won	
69	Laura Wolvaardt † (2/4)	115*	56	15	4	205.35	1	South Africa	Ireland	Newlands Cricket Ground, Cape Town	5 December 2025	Won	
70	Deepika Rasangika † (2/2)	107*	66	18	0	162.12	1	Bahrain	Saudi Arabia	Oman Cricket Academy Ground Turf 1, Al Amarat	12 December 2025	Won	
71	Natthakan Chantham	148*	69	23	4	214.49	1	Thailand	Singapore	Terdthai Cricket Ground, Bangkok	16 December 2025	Won	
72	Esha Oza † (5/5)	102*	68	12	1	150.00	1	United Arab Emirates	Bahrain	Oman Cricket Academy Ground Turf 1, Al Amarat	18 December 2025	Won	
73	Natasha Miles †	100*	70	12	3	142.85	1	Hong Kong	Malaysia	Gelephu International Cricket Ground, Gelephu	21 January 2026	Won	
74	Jayadhanyha Gunasekar †	101*	62	11	1	162.90	1	Oman	Denmark	Oman Cricket Academy Ground Turf 2, Al Amerat	6 February 2026	Won	
75	Amelia Kerr † (1/2)	101*	51	19	0	198.03	1	New Zealand	Zimbabwe	Seddon Park, Hamilton	25 February 2026	Won	
76	Fanny Utagushimaninde †	111*	65	17	0	170.76	1	Rwanda	Ghana	Tafawa Balewa Square Cricket Oval, Lagos	20 March 2026	Won	
77	Georgia Voll †	101	53	9	6	190.56	1	Australia	West Indies	Arnos Vale Stadium, Arnos Vale	23 March 2026	Won (DLS)	
78	Amelia Kerr † (2/2)	105	55	19	1	190.90	1	New Zealand	South Africa	Hagley Oval, Christchurch	25 March 2026	Won	
79	Laura Wolvaardt † (3/4)	115	53	14	5	216.98	2	South Africa	India	Wanderers Stadium, Johannesburg	22 April 2026	Won	
80	Ayesha Zafar †	102*	47	15	2	217.02	1	Pakistan	Zimbabwe	National Stadium, Karachi	12 May 2026	Won	
81	Danni Wyatt-Hodge † (3/3)	105*	62	13	1	169.35	1	England	Sri Lanka	Edgbaston Cricket Ground, Birmingham	12 June 2026	Won	
82	Chamari Athapaththu † (4/4)	106*	61	17	2	173.77	2	Sri Lanka	Ireland	County Ground, Bristol	23 June 2026	Won	
83	Tazmin Brits †	114*	69	15	3	165.21	1	South Africa	Netherlands	County Ground, Bristol	25 June 2026	Won	
84	Dunja Demic †	108*	78	14	3	138.46	1	Serbia	Bulgaria	Vasil Levski National Sports Academy, Sofia	27 June 2026	Won	
85	Lindsay Boas	121	58	17	6	208.62	1	Brazil	Jersey	Embrach Cricket Ground, Embrach	28 July 2026	Won	
86	Imesha Dulani †	101*	64	17	1	157.81	2	Sri Lanka	Pakistan	Rangiri Dambulla International Stadium, Dambulla	31 July 2026	Won	
87	Hillman-Bermejo	100*	46	19	0	217.39	1	Spain	Switzerland	Embrach Cricket Ground, Embrach	31 July 2026	Won	
88	Lucy Barnett †	123*	64	16	4	192.18	1	Isle of Man	Norway	Moara Vlasei Cricket Ground, Ilfov County	29 August 2026	Won	
89	Smriti Mandhana † (2/2)	124	64	14	7	193.75	1	India	Hong Kong	Dubai International Cricket Stadium, Dubai	3 September 2026	Won	
90	Laura Wolvaardt † (4/4)	126*	62	16	4	203.23	1	South Africa	Zimbabwe	Queens Sports Club, Bulawayo	15 September 2026	Won	
91	Miané Smit	102	59	15	1	172.88	1	South Africa	Zimbabwe	Queens Sports Club, Bulawayo	17 September 2026	Won	
92	Shafali Verma	100*	49	3	9	264.08	1	India	Bangladesh	Kōrogi Sports Park, Nisshin	20 September 2026	Won	

== Batters with multiple T20I centuries ==
Batters with multiple centuries
Batter	Centuries
(United Arab Emirates) Esha Oza	5
(Sri Lanka) Chamari Athapaththu	4
(South Africa) Laura Wolvaardt	4
(Tanzania) Fatuma Kibasu	3
(Cricket West Indies) Hayley Matthews	3
(Romania) Rebecca Blake	3
(England) Danni Wyatt-Hodge	3
(Cricket West Indies) Deandra Dottin	2
(Australia) Meg Lanning	2
(Australia) Beth Mooney	2
(Argentina) Maria Castiñeiras	2
(Uganda) Prosscovia Alako	2
(Ireland) Gaby Lewis	2
(Hong Kong) Mariko Hill	2
(Pakistan) Muneeba Ali	2
(Ireland) Amy Hunter	2
(Bahrain) Deepika Rasangika	2
(New Zealand) Amelia Kerr	2
(India) Smriti Mandhana	2
