= Maryam Omar =

Kuwaiti-born Palestinian cricketer (born 1993)

Personal information
- Full name: Maryam Osama Khalil Omar
- Born: 8 March 1993 (age 33); Kuwait
- Nickname: MOKO
- Batting: Right-handed
- Bowling: Right-arm off break
- Role: Batting all-rounder

International information
- National side: Kuwait
- T20I debut (cap 7): 18 February 2019 v Malaysia
- Last T20I: 14 February 2024 v Nepal

Career statistics
Competition	WT20I
Matches	32
Runs scored	480
Batting average	17.77
100s/50s	0/1
Top score	54
Balls bowled	550
Wickets	25
Bowling average	18.80
5 wickets in innings	0
10 wickets in match	0
Best bowling	4/14
Catches/stumpings	8/0
- Source: Cricinfo, 7 October 2024

Maryam Osama Khalil Omar (born 8 March 1993) is a Kuwaiti-Palestinian engineer and cricketer who plays for the Kuwait women's national cricket team as a right-handed batting all-rounder. She has also captained the national team. Born and raised in Kuwait, Omar is a Palestinian, and has been described as a "global grand tour all on her own"; she was educated in a Pakistani school in Kuwait, and also in Melbourne, Australia, where she now lives.

== Early life and education ==
=== Kuwait ===
Omar was born in Kuwait to mother Salwa and father Osama. She has three sisters, Amal, Zuhoor and Budoor. From an early age, she participated in a variety of sports, including basketball, gymnastics, judo, martial arts and swimming. She does not really remember whether her first baby steps were on land or in water: "My father's love for swimming had a big impact on me and I even competed at club levels in swimming tournaments." She has also said that her mother "did a great job in making me tough", and that it was for her mother that she attained a black belt in karate.

In 2010, aged 17, Omar was introduced to cricket at her Pakistani school in Kuwait. The national cricket board was targeting a number of schools to try to recruit girls to play the game. "My sports teacher came and told me that Kuwait Cricket was looking for girls to play in the Under-19 Asia Cup, and I said, 'What is cricket?'", she told Abu Dhabi-based newspaper The National in 2022. With encouragement from her mother, who suggested that she might ultimately make the national team, "I rocked up and was the only Arab in the side. I thought it might be hard for me to learn the game, but the coaches were so supportive." Before long, she was loving cricket, and had become so dedicated to learning it that she stopped following other sports.

When Omar started out as a cricketer, she found that her first name, which is very common in the Arab world, created a difficulty. So many other cricketers had the same first name that every time someone called out to her, "seven heads would turn around and I would get really confused." Omar therefore decided to adopt a unique nickname. She chose "MOKO", which is made up of the first letters of her full name. Her first preference shirt number is 25, which she believes is her lucky number.

Omar was also confronted with two other difficulties. First, cricket is seldom discussed in the Arab world, even though it is popular in Kuwait, where about 1.5 million of the total population of four million is made up of expats from Test-playing nations, including almost one million Indians. When Omar started playing cricket, her parents had never even heard of it. Although Omar, as a pupil of a Pakistani school, already had a vague awareness of the game, she neither understood the rules very much, nor knew how big it was. However, her coaches, Tariq Rasool and Tahir Khan, taught her all the cricket skills she needed, and even advised her to learn about the game by watching it on television.

Omar also trained for at least three hours daily, and attended umpiring and coaching courses organised by Cricket Kuwait. She watched videos of matches at Sharjah Cricket Stadium, and AB de Villiers of South Africa became her hero. Her parents, after observing her hard work, were supportive, even though they still do not really understand or relate to the game.

Secondly, and as Omar herself has put it, "Playing competitive sport is not a traditional role for women in the Middle East." Omar says that it is not easy for girls from the region to pursue a career in or passion for sport, and that none of her three sisters even play any sports. Instead, her sisters conform to social expectations by enjoying cooking, fashion, shopping and socialising with friends at home, and think that sports are for boys. "My sisters call me the tomboy", she told The National. In that context, Omar's father initially had difficulty in accepting her sporting aspirations, especially as they had the potential to take her away from her family. Although he eventually came around, he warned her that she would have to give up the game if it adversely affected her studies, and imposed a strict curfew of 9:00 pm, as in Arab culture it is not acceptable for girls to be out late. According to Omar, "It is good to have a strict dad because I have learnt to manage my time and push my limits."

After leaving school in 2010, Omar studied at the Australian College of Kuwait (ACK) for a Bachelor of Engineering Technology in civil and structural engineering. She completed that degree with "straight As" and "a perfect GPA" in 2014, and then worked for two years as a structural engineer in Kuwait. At that time, she first saw women playing franchise team cricket, when she happened, while visiting a cricket equipment shop in Kuwait, to see a broadcast of a match in Australia's domestic T20 competition, the WBBL. The experience led her to dream about playing for a WBBL team.

=== Australia ===
Omar's coaches in Kuwait, all of them Pakistanis or Indians, had already made her aware that Australia was arguably cricket's No 1 destination. Largely in pursuit of her WBBL dream, she submitted what has been described as "an impressive application" for a master's academic scholarship from the ACK to study at partner university CQUniversity in Australia, and was awarded the inaugural scholarship. Initially, she was to have been sent to Rockhampton in Queensland, but she specifically asked to study in Melbourne, because "it's the home of cricket".

Omar arrived in Melbourne, and began her master's in civil engineering, in 2016. The university contacted local cricket clubs, and she began playing for Essendon Maribyrnong in the 2016/17 season. While studying in Melbourne, she had more time to spend on cricket training. She also worked with Cricket Victoria as cricket development coordinator to drive female participation, and as a bridge engineer (intern) at pitt&sherry, an engineering consultancy. Since completing her master's in 2018, she has continued to live in Melbourne.

== Domestic career ==
=== Kuwait ===
On 19 October 2013, Omar captained Kuwait Blue, one of three teams involved in a full-day women's domestic tournament held at Sulaibiya turf ground in Kuwait. After leading her team to victory in the round robin matches against Kuwait Red and Kuwait Green, and to a nine wicket loss to Kuwait Red in the final, Omar shared the best batswoman of the tournament award with Amna Sharif.

=== Australia ===
Omar spent her first two cricket seasons in Melbourne, 2016/17 and 2017/18, at Essendon Maribyrnong Park Ladies Cricket Club, the oldest women's cricket club in the world. In both seasons, she played for both the Firsts and Reserves teams; in the former team, her teammates included then and future Australian players Molly Strano and Georgia Wareham, respectively, and State and WBBL player Makinley Blows. She also played for Port Melbourne in men's cricket competitions.

During Omar's first Australian season, "I was completely out of my comfort zone, new to the country, culture and did not know my way around public transport." In particular, the environment in which cricket was played was very different, and the standards of the players were very high. Omar's best performance in the Essendon Maribyrnong Firsts team was a top score for the team of 24 in a T20 match against Box Hill; she was also a member of the Premiership-winning Firsts One Day team. The statistics for her second season were markedly better, especially in the Firsts One Day competition.

Ahead of the 2018/19 season, Omar was recruited by Dandenong, which wanted an experienced player to augment its young squad. The move also gave Omar more opportunities to play in the Firsts competitions. To attend weekday after-work training but avoid peak hour road traffic, she would drive to Dandenong early in the morning, and catch a train to and from work in the Melbourne CBD. At the end of her first season at Dandenong, she was part of a team including Sophie Molineux, Nicole Faltum and Kim Garth that defeated an Essendon Maribyrnong team including Strano, Wareham, Blows, and former Australian player Kristen Beams, in the Firsts T20 grand final. In her three seasons at Dandenong, she also achieved consistent highest One Day match scores, of 42, 49 and 44*, respectively.

Omar then moved to the newly rebadged Carlton team for the 2021/22 season. Carlton was similarly seeking to bolster an inexperienced squad. Omar's first season there was less successful, with a highest One Day match score of 34 towards the end of the summer. She also played some further men's matches for Port Melbourne.

== International career ==
=== 2010–2019: Early years ===
Omar was first selected for the Kuwait national team squad in 2010, the same year she took up the game. The national squad travelled to Singapore to play in a tournament, and she therefore had to skip the first two weeks of her first semester in college. Her father was not amused. She was also still very inexperienced: "I played for two years for the Kuwaiti side without understanding the rules much. I was really just an expert fielder, like, 'See ball, catch ball'", she has since told The National.

In 2013, ahead of the ACC U19 Championship in Thailand, Omar was appointed as captain of the team. Although she thought at that time that her cricket knowledge was not up to the mark, she had been hoping for the captain's role when she felt she was ready. During that tournament, she scored her first international half century, in an innings in which she was unbeaten.

The following year, 2014, Omar was player of the tournament at the GCC Women's T20 Championship in Oman, in which Kuwait finished second. In 2015, she was again player of the tournament, and also led her team to its first ever tournament victory, in the Chiang Mai 3rd ladies championship in Thailand. By the middle of 2016, she considered herself to be as one of the top female cricketers in the Gulf region. In December 2016, after her move to Melbourne, she was named as best batswoman at the UAE International Women's T20 tournament in Sharjah.

=== 2019–present: WT20I career ===
On 18 February 2019, Omar made her Women's Twenty20 International (WT20I) debut for, and captained, Kuwait against Malaysia, in the second match of the 2019 ICC Women's Qualifier Asia, held in Bangkok, Thailand. The match was also Kuwait's first ever WT20I. Malaysia won the match, by 63 runs. Omar's best individual performance during the tournament was on 27 February 2019, in Kuwait's match against Nepal; she top scored for that match with 29 runs in 36 balls, and also took 2/24. However, Kuwait lost the match by 30 runs, and finished the tournament in last place, after losing all of its matches.

In January 2020, Kuwait participated in, and won, the Qatar Women's T20I Triangular Series in Doha, Qatar, but Omar was not involved in that tournament. In her absence, the Kuwait squad was captained by Amna Tariq.

In November 2021, Omar returned to the team for the ICC Women's T20 World Cup Asia Qualifier in Dubai, United Arab Emirates, but Tariq retained the captaincy. Omar played in all five of Kuwait's matches in the tournament, and topped the team's batting aggregates and averages with 107 runs at 26.75, but the team again lost all of its matches, and finished in last place.

Kuwait's and Omar's next WT20Is were during the GCC Women's Gulf Cup, held in Muscat, Oman, in March 2022. In a contest between six teams, Kuwait managed to finish in fourth place, with victories against both Qatar and Saudi Arabia. During the tournament, Omar once again played in all five of Kuwait's matches and topped the team's aggregates and averages, this time with 145 runs at 36.25. Her best all-round performance was on 22 March 2022, against Qatar: she took 4/14, scored 40 runs in 44 balls, and was awarded player of the match. Kuwait won that match, by 9 wickets, but three days later lost to Bahrain by six wickets, even though Omar had racked up her highest T20I score to date, with 54 runs in 47 balls.

== FairBreak career ==
In May 2022, Omar played in the privately run 2022 FairBreak Invitational T20 in Dubai, United Arab Emirates. She was allocated to the Sapphires team.

== Playing style ==
Omar is a right handed batting all-rounder. Her preferred batting position is number four in the order, and she bowls off spin. She sees herself as an aggressive player who nevertheless seeks to play according to the situation. In Kuwait, where she learned the game, women play only the T20 format. She was therefore trained to go out hard to gain advantage of the field restrictions during the power play.

In Melbourne, women play both T20 and 50 over format matches, and Omar took some time to adjust to the latter format.

For religious reasons, Omar wears a Muslim head-covering, a hijab, both on and off the cricket field. She decided to become a hijab wearer when she was 15 years old. Prior to taking the field at cricket matches, she dons a fast-wicking sports hijab. "For sport, I like the hijab a little tighter so I can run and dive around, and do all that cool stuff", she has said.

== Other activities ==
Since completing her master's degree, Omar has continued to work for pitt&sherry. Initially, she was a structural engineer, engaged in temporary works on the West Gate Tunnel project. Between 2019 and 2021, she was a civil/structural engineer, and since 2021 she has focused on civil engineering.

== See also ==
- List of Kuwait women Twenty20 International cricketers
