= List of Saudi Arabia women Twenty20 International cricketers =

This is a list of Saudi Arabia women Twenty20 International cricketers. A Women's Twenty20 International (WT20I) is an international cricket match between two representative teams. A T20I is played under the rules of Twenty20 cricket. In April 2018, the International Cricket Council (ICC) granted full international status to Twenty20 women's matches played between member sides from 1 July 2018 onwards. Saudi Arabia women played their first WT20I on 20 March 2022 against Kuwait during the 2022 GCC Women's Gulf Cup.

The list is arranged in the order in which each player won her first Twenty20 cap. Where more than one player won her first Twenty20 cap in the same match, those players are listed alphabetically by surname.

== Key ==
General

- ‡ – Captain
- † – Wicket-keeper
- First – Year of debut
- Last – Year of latest game
- Mat – Number of matches played

Batting

- Runs – Runs scored in career
- HS – Highest score
- Avg – Runs scored per dismissal
- * – Batsman remained not out
- 50 – Number of half centuries

Bowling

- Balls – Balls bowled in career
- Wkt – Wickets taken in career
- BBI – Best bowling in an innings
- Ave – Average runs per wicket

Fielding

- Ca – Catches taken
- St – Stumpings affected

== Players ==
Statistics are correct as of 9 June 2026.

Saudi Arabia women T20I cricketers
General					Batting				Bowling				Fielding		Ref
No.	Name	First	Last	Mat	Runs	HS	Avg	50	Balls	Wkt	BBI	Ave	Ca	St	Ref
1	Abeer Maryam	2022	2026	14	46	21	3.28	0	–	–	–	–	0	0	
2	Amna Khan	2022	2022	5	20	8*	5.00	0	60	1	1/35	121.00	0	0	
3	Emaan Ejaz	2022	2022	5	4	4	0.80	0	54	2	1/41	70.00	0	0	
4	Khazaima	2022	2022	3	2	2	0.66	0	–	–	–	–	0	0	
5	Mah Noor Aamir	2022	2026	13	5	1	0.50	0	152	3	1/17	114.66	0	0	
6	Maira Khan	2022	2022	5	36	12	7.20	0	84	2	2/48	91.50	0	0	
7	Rida Syeda	2022	2022	5	13	9	2.60	0	48	0	–	–	0	0	
8	Ruba Rashid†	2022	2022	5	8	7	1.60	0	–	–	–	–	1	0	
9	Cheryl Sewsunker‡	2022	2022	5	27	14	5.40	0	78	0	–	–	0	0	
10	Simrah Mirza†	2022	2025	8	7	4	1.16	0	42	1	1/37	84.00	0	0	
11	Zoha Irfan	2022	2022	4	3	2	0.75	0	–	–	–	–	0	0	
12	Najwa Akram	2022	2026	11	24	8	2.40	0	68	2	1/12	56.00	0	0	
13	Saba Ali Syeda	2022	2022	2	1	1*	–	0	–	–	–	–	0	0	
14	Ashmal Hashmi	2025	2026	9	10	4	1.25	0	90	0	–	–	0	0	
15	Laiba Nasrullah	2025	2026	7	3	2*	1.00	0	102	1	1/22	164.00	0	0	
16	Mah Noor	2025	2026	8	0	0*	0.00	0	72	3	3/35	48.66	1	0	
17	Mashael Waqas‡	2025	2026	9	72	36*	9.00	0	6	0	–	–	0	0	
18	Nimra Ghazanfar†	2025	2026	9	20	6	2.22	0	–	–	–	–	0	2	
19	Rumaisa Jawad Nasir	2025	2025	4	4	3	1.33	0	36	2	1/26	28.00	1	0	
20	Sara	2025	2026	6	38	19	7.60	0	42	2	2/34	36.00	2	0	
21	Usrah Umar Farooq	2025	2026	4	3	2	1.00	0	–	–	–	–	0	0	
22	Aridah Umer Farooq†	2025	2025	2	2	2	1.00	0	–	–	–	–	0	0	
23	Fatima Abbas	2025	2025	2	16	16	8.00	0	–	–	–	–	0	0	
24	Laiba	2026	2026	4	5	5	2.50	0	28	1	1/6	31.00	0	0	
25	Rizwana Begum	2026	2026	2	0	0	0.00	0	–	–	–	–	0	0	
26	Rizwana Begum	2026	2026	1	4	4	4.00	0	–	–	–	–	0	0	
27	Maheen Aamir	2026	2026	2	12	8	6.00	0	–	–	–	–	0	0	
