= List of Bahrain women Twenty20 International cricketers =

This is a list of Bahrain women Twenty20 International cricketers. A Women's Twenty20 International (WT20I) is an international cricket match between two representative teams. A T20I is played under the rules of Twenty20 cricket. In April 2018, the International Cricket Council (ICC) granted full international status to Twenty20 women's matches played between member sides from 1 July 2018 onwards. Bahrain women played their first WT20I on 20 March 2022 against Oman during the 2022 GCC Women's Gulf Cup.

The list is arranged in the order in which each player won her first Twenty20 cap. Where more than one player won their first Twenty20 cap in the same match, their names are listed alphabetically by surname.

== Key ==
General

- ‡ – Captain
- † – Wicket-keeper
- First – Year of debut
- Last – Year of latest game
- Mat – Number of matches played

Batting

- Runs – Runs scored in career
- HS – Highest score
- Avg – Runs scored per dismissal
- * – Batsman remained not out
- 50 – Number of half centuries
- 100 – Centuries scored

Bowling

- Balls – Balls bowled in career
- Wkt – Wickets taken in career
- BBI – Best bowling in an innings
- Ave – Average runs per wicket

Fielding

- Ca – Catches taken
- St – Stumpings affected

== Players ==
Statistics are correct as of 7 June 2026.

Bahrain women T20I cricketers
General					Batting					Bowling				Fielding		Ref
No.	Name	First	Last	Mat	Runs	HS	Avg	50	100	Balls	Wkt	BBI	Ave	Ca	St	Ref
1	Abeera Waris	2022	2026	25	164	27*	8.20	0	0	96	3	1/12	40.00	0	0	
2	Deepika Bhaskara	2022	2022	9	24	11*	8.00	0	0	68	2	1/14	44.00	1	0	
3	Gayani Fernando	2022	2023	7	10	5	2.50	0	0	30	1	1/21	61.00	0	0	
4	Tharanga Gajanayake‡	2022	2026	36	523	94*	17.43	2	0	627	25	3/4	25.92	8	0	
5	Rasika Hathadurage†	2022	2022	9	2	1	0.66	0	0	–	–	–	–	1	1	
6	Sachini Jayasinghe	2022	2022	8	1	1*	1.00	0	0	108	4	2/14	28.75	1	0	
7	Prajna Jagdeesha	2022	2023	13	13	12*	3.25	0	0	42	1	1/14	59.00	2	0	
8	Shashikala Prakas	2022	2024	12	15	6	2.50	0	0	–	–	–	–	0	0	
9	Deepika Rasangika‡ (Note: Deepika Rasangika also played 32 WT20I matches for Sri Lanka. Only her record for Bahrain is given above.)	2022	2026	40	1,253	161*	44.75	4	2	502	21	3/9	28.85	12	0	
10	Rasika Rodrigo	2022	2025	27	205	50*	9.31	1	0	–	–	–	–	1	0	
11	Pavithra Shetty	2022	2025	27	113	21*	7.06	0	0	486	15	3/10	33.46	2	0	
12	Swarna Nunna	2022	2025	8	7	7	1.40	0	0	96	2	1/20	60.50	0	0	
13	Asha Samildeen	2022	2024	6	6	5	2.00	0	0	–	–	–	–	0	0	
14	Vilcita Barboza	2022	2022	4	0	0	0.00	0	0	60	2	1/7	40.00	0	0	
15	Ishara Suhun	2022	2025	24	91	30	4.78	0	0	90	1	1/17	132.00	1	0	
16	Poorvaja Jagdeesha	2022	2025	20	110	22*	7.85	0	0	35	0	–	–	0	0	
17	Sadamali Bhakshala	2023	2025	22	50	10*	4.54	0	0	382	6	2/18	72.50	4	0	
18	Ashwini Govinda†	2023	2026	15	11	3*	2.75	0	0	–	–	–	–	3	1	
19	Manal Malik	2023	2023	2	0	0	0.00	0	0	6	0	–	–	1	0	
20	Sana Butt†	2024	2026	22	44	8	3.38	0	0	–	–	–	–	2	5	
21	Durriya Malik†	2024	2024	1	0	0	0.00	0	0	–	–	–	–	0	0	
22	Nishma Pereira†	2024	2024	1	1	1	1.00	0	0	–	–	–	–	0	0	
23	Saee Parkhi	2024	2026	16	41	11	5.12	0	0	69	0	–	–	3	0	
24	Shruti Yadav	2024	2026	9	1	1*	0.50	0	0	150	8	3/18	21.50	0	0	
25	Zayneb Fazli	2024	2025	8	40	16	6.66	0	0	100	2	1/22	69.50	0	0	
26	Jhaancy Matadha	2024	2024	2	–	–	–	–	–	–	–	–	–	0	0	
27	Sheetal Hate	2024	2025	3	2	2*	–	0	0	–	–	–	–	0	0	
28	Sara Vivek	2025	2026	12	21	10	3.50	0	0	144	1	1/24	179.00	0	0	
29	Sweeta Corda	2025	2026	15	136	34*	13.60	0	0	42	0	–	–	1	0	
30	Reshel D'Souza	2025	2026	13	8	3	0.80	0	0	204	5	2/14	51.40	0	0	
31	Eman Said	2025	2025	1	1	1	1.00	0	0	–	–	–	–	0	0	
32	Nipuni Nadeera	2025	2026	5	12	7	3.00	0	0	–	–	–	–	0	0	
33	Sudeshika Ranawaka	2025	2025	6	1	1	0.33	0	0	97	5	2/16	21.80	1	0	
34	Reema Naseer	2025	2026	7	33	13	4.71	0	0	–	–	–	–	0	0	
35	Disna Jayasooriya	2026	2026	4	0	0	0.00	0	0	39	2	1/14	27.00	0	0	
36	Manmeet Kaur	2026	2026	1	0	0*	–	0	0	–	–	–	–	0	0	
