= List of Kuwait women Twenty20 International cricketers =

This is a list of Kuwaiti women Twenty20 International cricketers. A Twenty20 International (T20I) is an international cricket match between two representative teams, each having Twenty20 International status, as determined by the International Cricket Council (ICC). A T20I is played under the rules of Twenty20 cricket. This list includes names of all players who have played at least one T20I match for Kuwait and is initially arranged in the order of debut appearance. Where more than one player won their first cap in the same match, their names are initially listed alphabetically at the time of debut.

== Key ==
General

- ‡ – Captain
- † – Wicket-keeper
- First – Year of debut
- Last – Year of latest game
- Mat – Number of matches played

Batting

- Runs – Runs scored in career
- HS – Highest score
- Avg – Runs scored per dismissal
- * – Batsman remained not out
- 50 – Number of half centuries

Bowling

- Wkt – Wickets taken in career
- BBI – Best bowling in an innings
- Ave – Average runs per wicket

Fielding

- Ca – Catches taken
- St – Stumpings affected

== List of players ==
Statistics are correct as of 6 June 2026.

Kuwait women T20I cricketers
General					Batting				Bowling				Fielding		Ref
No.	Name	First	Last	Mat	Runs	HS	Avg	50	Balls	Wkt	BBI	Ave	Ca	St	Ref
1	Amna Tariq‡	2019	2026	63	421	32*	8.59	0	1204	42	4/9	23.76	17	0	
2	Siobhan Gomez	2019	2026	56	333	42*	8.32	0	119	2	1/14	67.00	3	0	
3	Khadija Khalil†	2019	2026	56	233	22*	6.65	0	174	12	2/7	18.33	9	2	
4	Madeeha Zuberi	2019	2024	13	6	2*	1.50	0	188	7	2/16	23.00	5	0	
5	Mariamma Hyder	2019	2026	61	229	26	8.80	0	1141	50	4/8	19.46	9	0	
6	Maria Jasvi	2019	2026	60	95	9*	3.95	0	995	48	5/6	19.52	9	0	
7	Maryam Omar‡	2019	2026	47	709	65*	19.16	2	730	33	4/14	18.00	11	0	
8	Maryyam Ashraf	2019	2024	35	92	22*	6.13	0	42	1	1/19	36.00	3	0	
9	Priyada Murali	2019	2026	60	844	45	15.62	0	708	30	3/11	24.36	14	0	
10	Sabreen Zaki	2019	2025	9	61	34	10.16	0	30	0	–	–	0	0	
11	Zeefa Jilani	2019	2026	56	729	77	15.18	2	361	17	4/13	18.88	18	0	
12	Mahnoor Mahmood	2019	2019	2	0	0	0.00	0	–	–	–	–	0	0	
13	Mofida Kocchargi	2019	2020	2	0	0	0.00	0	–	–	–	–	0	0	
14	Iqra Ishaq	2019	2023	10	11	6	3.66	0	–	–	–	–	1	0	
15	Ayeesha Yasmeen	2020	2020	4	0	0	0.00	0	–	–	–	–	0	0	
16	Aakriti Bose†	2020	2022	18	16	5	2.66	0	–	–	–	–	1	2	
17	Raelyn D'Souza	2020	2025	13	3	2	1.00	0	6	0	–	–	1	0	
18	Glenda Menezes	2021	2024	8	6	5	1.50	0	–	–	–	–	0	0	
19	Rida Zainab	2021	2022	4	6	6	3.00	0	–	–	–	–	0	0	
20	Balasubramani Shanti	2021	2026	49	370	29	10.57	0	12	0	–	–	11	0	
21	Venora D'Souza	2021	2026	6	7	5*	3.50	0	–	–	–	–	1	0	
22	Suchitha D'Sa†	2023	2026	35	127	34	5.29	0	–	–	–	–	6	8	
23	Angel D'Costa	2023	2023	2	–	–	–	–	12	0	–	–	0	0	
24	Candice Dias	2024	2026	14	14	5*	14.00	0	245	11	2/10	18.63	2	0	
25	Bhavani Yekkeli†	2024	2025	3	–	–	–	–	–	–	–	–	1	1	
26	Tshering Yangchen (Note: Tshering Yangchen also played 3 WT20I matches for Bhutan. Only her record for Kuwait is given above.)	2025	2026	8	4	3	2.00	0	126	5	3/16	24.00	0	0	
