= 2022 GCC Women's Gulf Cup =

International cricket tournament

- Dates: 20 – 26 March 2022
- Administrator: Gulf Cooperation Council
- Cricket format: Twenty20 International
- Tournament format: Round-robin
- Host: Oman
- Champions: United Arab Emirates (3rd title)
- Runners-up: Oman
- Participants: 6
- Matches: 15
- Player of the series: (United Arab Emirates) Esha Oza
- Most runs: (United Arab Emirates) Esha Oza (253)
- Most wickets: (Kuwait) Maria Jasvi (8)

The 2022 GCC Women's Gulf Cup was a Twenty20 International (T20I) cricket tournament played in Oman from 20 to 26 March 2022. Organised by the Gulf Cooperation Council (GCC), the tournament featured the women's national teams of Oman, Bahrain, Kuwait, Qatar, Saudi Arabia and United Arab Emirates. Bahrain and Saudi Arabia played their first official women's T20I matches during this tournament.

This was the fourth edition of the women's Gulf Cup, which had been contested annually from 2014 to 2016. The inaugural event in 2014 was hosted in Oman, was contested by Oman, UAE, Kuwait and Qatar, and was won by UAE who defeated Kuwait by 49 runs in the final. Qatar hosted the event in 2015, which saw UAE retain the title by defeating the hosts by five wickets in the final following a round-robin stage that also involved Oman. The 2016 edition was played at the Sharjah Cricket Stadium, and was contested by UAE, Oman, Kuwait, Qatar and guest teams from Kenya, Malaysia and Uganda. Kenya won the 2016 title with a five-wicket win over UAE in the final.

On 22 March 2022, in the match between Bahrain and Saudi Arabia, Deepika Rasangika of Bahrain set a new record for the highest individual score in a women's T20I match, scoring 161 not out.

== Squads ==
Bahrain	Kuwait	Oman	Qatar	Saudi Arabia	United Arab Emirates
Tharanga Gajanayake (c); Vilcita Barboza; Deepika Bhaskara; Gayani Fernando; Rasika Hathadurage (wk); Prajna Jagdeesha; Sachini Jayasinghe; Swarna Nunna; Shashikala Prakash; Deepika Rasangika; Rasika Rodrigo; Asha Samildeen; Pavithra Shetty; Abeera Waris	Amna Tariq (c); Maryyam Ashraf; Aakriti Bose (wk); Venora D'Souza; Siobhan Gomez; Mariamma Hyder; Iqra Ishaq; Maria Jasvi; Zeefa Jilani; Khadija Khalil; Priyada Murali; Maryam Omar; Balasubramani Shanti; Rida Zainab	Vaishali Jesrani (c); Fiza Javed (vc); Afida Afthab; Nayan Anil; Saya Channa; Amanda Dcosta; Nikhita Jagadish; Kashish Jayawant; Sameera Khan; Priyanka Mendonca; Snehal Nair; Sushanthika Sathiya; Bhakti Shetty; Sakshi Shetty (wk)	Aysha (c); Hiral Agarwal; Shahreen Bahadur; Saachi Dhadwal; Rizpha Bano Emmanuel (wk); Khadija Imtiaz; Trupti Kale; Aleena Khan; Angeline Mare; Sabeeja Panayan; Kerry Pounsett; Rochelle Quyn; Shrutiben Rana; Aisha Rahman	Cheryl Sewsunker (c); Najwa Akram; Mah Noor Amir; Emaan Ejaz; Zoha Irfan; Amna Khan; Maira Khan; Khazaima; Abeer Maryam; Simrah Mirza; Ruba Rashid (wk); Rida Syeda; Saba Ali Syeda	Chaya Mughal (c); Samaira Dharnidharka; Kavisha Egodage; Mahika Gaur; Siya Gokhale; Lavanya Keny; Suraksha Kotte; Vaishnave Mahesh; Indhuja Nandakumar; Esha Oza; Rinitha Rajith; Rithika Rajith; Theertha Satish (wk); Khushi Sharma

Kuwait named Noora Bahurudeen and Reema Bahurudeen as reserves. Qatar included Manjiri Bawane, Sneha Chandnani, Fatima Saeed and Sharon Williams as reserves.

== Points table ==
Pos	Team	Pld	W	L	NR	Pts	NRR
1	United Arab Emirates	5	5	0	0	10	7.066
2	Oman	5	4	1	0	8	2.180
3	Qatar	5	2	3	0	4	1.663
4	Kuwait	5	2	3	0	4	−0.016
5	Bahrain	5	2	3	0	4	−0.300
6	Saudi Arabia	5	0	5	0	0	−12.108

Source: ESPNcricinfo

== Fixtures ==
20 March 2022
09:00
Scorecard

Oman; 157/7 (20 overs)	v	Bahrain; 61/7 (20 overs)
Sakshi Shetty 39 (30); Tharanga Gajanayake 3/18 (4 overs)		Abeera Waris 14 (37); Priyanka Mendonca 2/2 (3 overs)

Oman won by 96 runs
Oman Cricket Academy Ground Turf 2, Muscat
Umpires: Azad KR (Oma) and Navaneetha Krishnan (Oma)
Player of the match: Priyanka Mendonca (Oma)

- Bahrain won the toss and elected to field.
- Nayan Anil, Saya Channa, Amanda Dcosta (Oma), Deepika Bhaskara, Gayani Fernando, Tharanga Gajanayake, Rasika Hathadurage, Prajna Jagdeesha, Sachini Jayasinghe, Shashikala Prakash, Rasika Rodrigo, Pavithra Shetty and Abeera Waris (Bhr) all made their T20I debuts.
- Deepika Rasangika also made her T20I debut for Bahrain after previously playing 32 T20Is for Sri Lanka.

20 March 2022
13:30
Scorecard

Qatar; 75/8 (20 overs)	v	United Arab Emirates; 78/2 (8 overs)
Saachi Dhadwal 27 (36); Khushi Sharma 4/4 (3 overs)		Kavisha Egodage 50* (29); Rochelle Quyn 1/15 (2 overs)

United Arab Emirates won by 8 wickets
Oman Cricket Academy Ground Turf 2, Muscat
Umpires: Azad KR (Oma) and Samir Sattar (Oma)
Player of the match: Khushi Sharma (UAE)

- Qatar won the toss and elected to bat.
- Siya Gokhale, Lavanya Keny and Rinitha Rajith (UAE) all made their T20I debuts.

20 March 2022
18:00 (D/N)
Scorecard

Saudi Arabia; 31 (14.3 overs)	v	Kuwait; 32/0 (2.1 overs)
Maira Khan 12 (27); Maria Jasvi 5/6 (3 overs)		Priyada Murali 11* (8)

Kuwait won by 10 wickets
Oman Cricket Academy Ground Turf 2, Muscat
Umpires: Venketson Karthikeyan (Oma) and Azad KR (Oma)
Player of the match: Maria Jasvi (Kuw)

- Kuwait won the toss and elected to field.
- Mah Noor Amir, Emaan Ejaz, Zoha Irfan, Amna Khan, Maira Khan, Khazaima, Abeer Maryam, Simrah Mirza, Ruba Rashid, Rida Syeda and Cheryl Sewsunker (Sau) all made their T20I debuts.
- Maria Jasvi became the first player for Kuwait to take a five-wicket haul in women's T20Is.

21 March 2022
09:00
Scorecard

Qatar; 124/6 (20 overs)	v	Bahrain; 120/3 (20 overs)
Shahreen Bahadur 31 (38); Deepika Bhaskara 1/14 (2 overs)		Tharanga Gajanayake 43 (46); Aleena Khan 1/15 (4 overs)

Qatar won by 4 runs
Oman Cricket Academy Ground Turf 2, Muscat
Umpires: Navaneetha Krishnan (Oma) and Samir Sattar (Oma)
Player of the match: Shahreen Bahadur (Qat)

- Qatar won the toss and elected to bat.
- Swarna Nunna and Asha Samildeen (Bhr) both made their T20I debuts.

21 March 2022
13:30
Scorecard

Oman; 234/3 (20 overs)	v	Saudi Arabia; 52 (15.5 overs)
Fiza Javed 76* (57); Amna Khan 1/35 (4 overs)		Cheryl Sewsunker 14 (10); Kashish Jayawant 3/2 (3.5 overs)

Oman won by 182 runs
Oman Cricket Academy Ground Turf 2, Muscat
Umpires: Azad KR (Oma) and Samir Sattar (Oma)
Player of the match: Fiza (Oma)

- Saudi Arabia won the toss and elected to field.
- Afida Afthab, Kashish Jayawant, Sushanthika Sathiya (Oma) and Najwa Akram (Sau) all made their T20I debuts.

21 March 2022
18:00 (D/N)
Scorecard

United Arab Emirates; 158/2 (20 overs)	v	Kuwait; 85/8 (20 overs)
Kavisha Egodage 92* (74); Priyada Murali 1/10 (2 overs)		Maryam Omar 46 (30); Esha Oza 3/5 (2 overs)

United Arab Emirates won by 73 runs
Oman Cricket Academy Ground Turf 2, Muscat
Umpires: Azad KR (Oma) and Venketson Karthikeyan (Oma)
Player of the match: Kavisha Egodage (UAE)

- United Arab Emirates won the toss and elected to bat.
- Indhuja Nandakumar (UAE) made her T20I debut.

22 March 2022
09:00
Scorecard

Bahrain; 318/1 (20 overs)	v	Saudi Arabia; 49/8 (20 overs)
Deepika Rasangika 161* (66); Emaan Ejaz 1/63 (4 overs)		Maira Khan 9 (40); Deepika Rasangika 3/9 (4 overs)

Bahrain won by 269 runs
Oman Cricket Academy Ground Turf 2, Muscat
Umpires: Navaneetha Krishnan (Oma) and Samir Sattar (Oma)
Player of the match: Deepika Rasangika (Bhr)

- Saudi Arabia won the toss and elected to field.
- Vilcita Barboza (Bhr) and Saba Ali Syeda (Sau) both made their T20I debuts.
- Deepika Rasangika became the first player for Bahrain to score a century in women's T20Is. Her score of 161* was the highest individual score in women's T20Is.
- Bahrain's 318/1 was the highest team total in a women's T20I innings.
- The unbroken 255-run partnership between Tharanga Gajanayake and Deepika Rasangika (Bhr) was the highest for the second wicket in women's T20Is.

22 March 2022
13:30
Scorecard

Qatar; 73 (18.2 overs)	v	Kuwait; 74/1 (13.5 overs)
Aleena Khan 15 (15); Maryam Omar 4/14 (4 overs)		Maryam Omar 40 (44); Rochelle Quyn 1/21 (4 overs)

Kuwait won by 9 wickets
Oman Cricket Academy Ground Turf 2, Muscat
Umpires: Azad KR (Oma) and Venketson Karthikeyan (Oma)
Player of the match: Maryam Omar (Kuw)

- Qatar won the toss and elected to bat.

22 March 2022
18:00 (D/N)
Scorecard

United Arab Emirates; 204/4 (20 overs)	v	Oman; 95/7 (20 overs)
Esha Oza 67 (31); Bhakti Shetty 1/24 (4 overs)		Fiza Javed 37 (65); Chaya Mughal 3/14 (4 overs)

United Arab Emirates won by 109 runs
Oman Cricket Academy Ground Turf 2, Muscat
Umpires: Venketson Karthikeyan (Oma) and Samir Sattar (Oma)
Player of the match: Esha Oza (UAE)

- United Arab Emirates won the toss and elected to bat.
- Rithika Rajith (UAE) made her T20I debut.

24 March 2022
09:30
Scorecard

Oman; 128/4 (20 overs)	v	Kuwait; 81 (17.1 overs)
Sakshi Shetty 71* (60); Khadija Khalil 2/17 (3 overs)		Khadija Khalil 18 (34); Amanda Dcosta 5/11 (3 overs)

Oman won by 47 runs
Oman Cricket Academy Ground Turf 1, Muscat
Umpires: Navaneetha Krishnan (Oma) and Samir Sattar (Oma)
Player of the match: Sakshi Shetty (Oma)

- Kuwait won the toss and elected to field.
- Amanda Dcosta became the first player for Oman to take a five-wicket haul in women's T20Is.

24 March 2022
09:30
Scorecard

Saudi Arabia; 25 (12.3 overs)	v	United Arab Emirates; 26/0 (1.5 overs)
Cheryl Sewsunker 6 (23); Lavanya Keny 3/3 (2 overs)		Lavanya Keny 12* (7)

United Arab Emirates won by 10 wickets
Oman Cricket Academy Ground Turf 2, Muscat
Umpires: Azad KR (Oma) and Zaman Quoraishi (Oma)
Player of the match: Lavanya Keny (UAE)

- United Arab Emirates won the toss and elected to field.
- Lavanya Keny became the first bowler for United Arab Emirates to take a hat-trick in women's T20Is.

25 March 2022
19:00 (D/N)
Scorecard

Qatar; 282/2 (20 overs)	v	Saudi Arabia; 26 (18.1 overs)
Aysha 113* (58); Maira Khan 2/48 (4 overs)		Amna Khan 6 (12); Hiral Agarwal 4/4 (4 overs)

Qatar won by 256 runs
Oman Cricket Academy Ground Turf 1, Muscat
Umpires: Azad KR (Oma) and Venketson Karthikeyan (Oma)
Player of the match: Aysha (Qat)

- Qatar won the toss and elected to bat.
- Aysha and Shahreen Bahadur became the first players for Qatar to score a century in women's T20Is.

25 March 2022
19:00 (D/N)
Scorecard

Kuwait; 125/4 (20 overs)	v	Bahrain; 127/4 (18.4 overs)
Maryam Omar 54 (47); Sachini Jayasinghe 2/25 (4 overs)		Tharanga Gajanayake 54* (57); Khadija Khalil 2/23 (4 overs)

Bahrain won by 6 wickets
Oman Cricket Academy Ground Turf 2, Muscat
Umpires: Rahul Asher (Oma) and Kaushik Vyas (Oma)

- Kuwait won the toss and elected to bat.

26 March 2022
18:00 (D/N)
Scorecard

Oman; 97/8 (20 overs)	v	Qatar; 95/8 (20 overs)
Vaishali Jesrani 23 (33); Rochelle Quyn 1/13 (4 overs)		Aysha 24 (25); Priyanka Mendonca 3/11 (4 overs)

Oman won by 2 runs
Oman Cricket Academy Ground Turf 1, Muscat
Umpires: Rahul Asher (Oma) and Kaushik Vyas (Oma)
Player of the match: Priyanka Mendonca (Oma)

- Oman won the toss and elected to bat.

26 March 2022
18:00 (D/N)
Scorecard

United Arab Emirates; 253/1 (20 overs)	v	Bahrain; 43 (16 overs)
Esha Oza 158* (71)		Tharanga Gajanayake 25* (45); Lavanya Keny 4/3 (3 overs)

United Arab Emirates won by 210 runs
Oman Cricket Academy Ground Turf 2, Muscat
Umpires: Azad KR (Oma) and Samir Sattar (Oma)
Player of the match: Esha Oza (UAE)

- United Arab Emirates won the toss and elected to bat.
- Esha Oza became the first player for United Arab Emirates to score a century in women's T20Is.
