= 2018 England women's Tri-Nation Series =

International cricket tournament

- Date: 20 June–1 July 2018
- Location: England
- Result: England won the series
- Player of the series: Sophie Ecclestone (Eng)
Teams
England	New Zealand	South Africa
Captains
Heather Knight	Suzie Bates	Dane van Niekerk
Most runs
Tammy Beaumont (256)	Suzie Bates (240)	Dane van Niekerk (180)
Most wickets
Sophie Ecclestone (10)	Hayley Jensen (6)	Shabnim Ismail (3); Zintle Mali (3)

The 2018 England women's Tri-Nation Series was a cricket tournament that took place in England in June and July 2018. It was a tri-nation series between England women, South Africa women and the New Zealand women cricket teams. The matches were played as Women's Twenty20 International (WT20I) fixtures, with two matches were played each day. The top two teams progressed to the final on 1 July 2018.

In the opening fixture of the series, New Zealand set a new record for the highest innings total in WT20Is, scoring 216 runs for the loss of one wicket against South Africa, in their 20 overs. Hours later on the same day, England broke the record, by scoring 250 runs for the loss of three wickets, also against South Africa. England went on to beat South Africa by 121 runs to record their biggest winning margin, in terms of runs, in WT20Is.

In the fifth match, New Zealand beat South Africa by eight wickets. Thefefore, New Zealand and England both progressed to the final, with South Africa being eliminated. In the following match, New Zealand's Suzie Bates became the second woman, after Jenny Gunn, to play in her 100th WT20I match. England won the tri-series, beating New Zealand by seven wickets in the final.

== Squads ==
England	New Zealand	South Africa
Heather Knight (c); Tammy Beaumont; Katherine Brunt; Sophie Ecclestone; Georgia Elwiss; Jenny Gunn; Danielle Hazell; Amy Jones (wk); Laura Marsh; Anya Shrubsole; Nat Sciver; Sarah Taylor (wk); Danni Wyatt; Natasha Farrant*; Katie George*; Lauren Winfield*	Suzie Bates (c); Bernadine Bezuidenhout; Sophie Devine; Kate Ebrahim; Maddy Green; Holly Huddleston; Hayley Jensen; Leigh Kasperek; Amelia Kerr; Katey Martin; Anna Peterson; Hannah Rowe; Amy Satterthwaite; Lea Tahuhu; Jess Watkin	Dane van Niekerk (c); Tazmin Brits; Shabnim Ismail; Marizanne Kapp; Ayabonga Khaka; Masabata Klaas; Stacy Lackay; Lizelle Lee (wk); Suné Luus; Zintle Mali; Raisibe Ntozakhe; Mignon du Preez; Andrie Steyn; Chloe Tryon; Laura Wolvaardt

When England announced their squad they said that Katie George and Lauren Winfield would only be in the squad for their double-header on 23 June. Natasha Farrant was also added to England's squad for the double-header.

== Points table ==
Pos	Team	Pld	W	L	T	NR	Pts	NRR
1	England	4	3	1	0	0	6	2.571
2	New Zealand	4	2	2	0	0	4	0.238
3	South Africa	4	1	3	0	0	2	−2.855

== WT20I series ==
=== 1st WT20I ===
20 June 2018
13:00
Scorecard

New Zealand; 216/1 (20 overs)	v	South Africa; 150/6 (20 overs)
Suzie Bates 124* (66); Marizanne Kapp 1/32 (4 overs)		Dane van Niekerk 58 (44); Hayley Jensen 3/28 (4 overs)

New Zealand Women won by 66 runs
County Ground, Taunton
Umpires: David Millns (Eng) and Alex Wharf (Eng)
Player of the match: Suzie Bates (NZ)

- South Africa Women won the toss and elected to field.
- New Zealand Women set a new record for the highest innings total in WT20Is.
- Suzie Bates and Sophie Devine (NZ) made the highest partnership for any wicket in WT20Is (182).
- Suzie Bates also scored her first century in WT20Is and became the leading run-scorer in the format, passing Charlotte Edwards' total of 2,605 runs.

=== 2nd WT20I ===
20 June 2018
17:40 (D/N)
Scorecard

England; 250/3 (20 overs)	v	South Africa; 129/6 (20 overs)
Tammy Beaumont 116 (52); Stacy Lackay 2/59 (4 overs)		Dane van Niekerk 72 (51); Katherine Brunt 2/18 (4 overs)

England Women won by 121 runs
County Ground, Taunton
Umpires: Jeff Evans (Eng) and David Millns (Eng)
Player of the match: Tammy Beaumont (Eng)

- England Women won the toss and elected to bat.
- Anya Shrubsole (Eng) played in her 50th WT20I.
- Tammy Beaumont (Eng) scored her first century in WT20Is.
- England Women set a new record for the highest innings total in WT20Is.
- In terms of runs, this was England's biggest winning margin in WT20Is.

=== 3rd WT20I ===
23 June 2018
13:00
Scorecard

England; 160/5 (20 overs)	v	South Africa; 166/4 (19.3 overs)
Tammy Beaumont 71 (59); Shabnim Ismail 2/27 (4 overs)		Lizelle Lee 68 (37); Anya Shrubsole 2/24 (4 overs)

South Africa Women won by 6 wickets
County Ground, Taunton
Umpires: Martin Saggers (Eng) and Alex Wharf (Eng)
Player of the match: Suné Luus (SA)

- England Women won the toss and elected to bat.
- This was South Africa Women's highest successful run chase in WT20Is.

=== 4th WT20I ===
23 June 2018
17:40 (D/N)
Scorecard

England; 172/8 (20 overs)	v	New Zealand; 118 (18.3 overs)
Nat Sciver 59 (37); Leigh Kasperek 3/35 (3 overs)		Suzie Bates 23 (17); Maddy Green 23 (17); Sophie Ecclestone 4/18 (4 overs)

England Women won by 54 runs
County Ground, Taunton
Umpires: Jeff Evans (Eng) and Martin Saggers (Eng)
Player of the match: Sophie Ecclestone (Eng)

- England Women won the toss and elected to bat.

=== 5th WT20I ===
28 June 2018
13:00
Scorecard

South Africa; 148/6 (20 overs)	v	New Zealand; 151/2 (15.2 overs)
Chloe Tryon 35 (15); Hayley Jensen 2/24 (4 overs)		Sophie Devine 68* (40); Marizanne Kapp 1/30 (3.2 overs)

New Zealand Women won by 8 wickets
Bristol County Ground, Bristol
Umpires: David Millns (Eng) and Alex Wharf (Eng)
Player of the match: Sophie Devine (NZ)

- South Africa Women won the toss and elected to bat.
- New Zealand and England progressed to the final as a result of this match.

=== 6th WT20I ===
28 June 2018
17:40 (D/N)
Scorecard

New Zealand; 129 (18.1 overs)	v	England; 130/3 (15.5 overs)
Sophie Devine 52 (45); Anya Shrubsole 3/16 (3.1 overs)		Sarah Taylor 51 (37); Jess Watkin 2/27 (4 overs)

England Women won by 7 wickets
Bristol County Ground, Bristol
Umpires: Neil Bainton (Eng) and Alex Wharf (Eng)
Player of the match: Anya Shrubsole (Eng)

- New Zealand Women won the toss and elected to bat.
- Suzie Bates (NZ) became the second woman to play in 100 WT20Is.

== Final ==
1 July 2018
15:00 (D/N)
Scorecard

New Zealand; 137/9 (20 overs)	v	England; 141/3 (17.1 overs)
Sophie Devine 31 (18); Danielle Hazell 2/20 (4 overs)		Danni Wyatt 50 (35); Amelia Kerr 2/22 (4 overs)

England Women won by 7 wickets
County Cricket Ground, Chelmsford
Umpires: Neil Bainton (Eng) and Alex Wharf
Player of the match: Katherine Brunt (Eng)

- New Zealand Women won the toss and elected to bat.
