= Chile women's cricket team in Argentina in 2023–24 =

	Argentina	Chile
- Dates: 13 – 15 October 2023
Captains	Alison Stocks	Camila Valdes

Twenty20 International series
- Results: Argentina won the 3-match series 3–0
Most runs	Maria Castiñeiras (300)	Jessica Miranda (30)
Most wickets	Albertina Galan (7)	Sofia Mardones (2); Esperanza Rubio (2); Camila Valdes (2)

The Chile women's cricket team toured Argentina in October 2023 to play three Twenty20 International (T20I) matches. All three matches were held at the St Albans Club Ground in Buenos Aires, and Argentina won the series 3–0.

In the first match, Argentina scored 427/1 in the first innings and dismissed Chile for 63. In doing so, Argentina broke a number of records in all T20I cricket, including the highest score and the biggest winning margin in terms of runs (364). Argentina's Lucia Taylor made the highest ever score (169) and together with Albertina Galan had the biggest ever partnership by runs (350). The match was also unusual in that not a single six was scored.

In the second match, Argentina made 300/6 and Chile replied with 19, with eight of the Chilean players scoring ducks. The third match saw Argentina making 333/1 and Chile 22, of which 21 were extras; again, eight Chilean players scored ducks. Maria Castiñeiras of Argentina became the first woman to score back-to-back T20I centuries, and she also put on an unbeaten record second-wicket partnership of 290 runs alongside Veronica Vasquez.

== Squads ==
Argentina	Chile
Alison Stocks (c); Veronica Vasquez (vc); Tamara Basile; Maria Castiñeiras; Julieta Cullen; Alina Emch; Albertina Galan; Francesca Galan; Catalina Greloni; Malena Lollo (wk); Mariana Martinez; Naara Patron Fuentes (wk); Alison Prince; Martina Quinn; Constanza Sosa; Lucia Taylor	Camila Valdes (c); Sofia Araya; Veronica Maldonado (wk); Sofia Mardones; Florencia Martinez; Jessica Miranda; Franchesca Moya (wk); Yadhira Nunez (wk); Constanza Oyarce; Esperanza Rubio; Maria Salazar; Emilia Toro; Constanza Vergara

== T20I series ==
=== 1st T20I ===
13 October 2023
15:00
Scorecard

Argentina; 427/1 (20 overs)	v	Chile; 63 (15 overs)
Lucia Taylor 169 (84); Jessica Miranda 1/64 (4 overs)		Jessica Miranda 27 (29); Alison Stocks 1/6 (2 overs); Julieta Cullen 1/6 (2 overs)

Argentina won by 364 runs
St Albans Club, Buenos Aires
Umpires: Santiago Duggan (Arg) and Andrew Elliott (Eng)
Player of the match: Lucia Taylor (Arg)

- Chile won the toss and elected to field.
- Sofia Araya, Florencia Martinez, Yadhira Nunez, Esperanza Rubio, Maria Salazar, Emilia Toro and Constanza Vergara (Chi) all made their T20I debuts.

=== 2nd T20I ===
14 October 2023
14:45
Scorecard

Argentina; 300/6 (20 overs)	v	Chile; 19 (9.2 overs)
Maria Castiñeiras 105 (56); Sofia Mardones 2/37 (3 overs)		Jessica Miranda 3 (10); Albertina Galan 3/0 (1 over)

Argentina won by 281 runs
St Albans Club, Buenos Aires
Umpires: Santiago Duggan (Arg) and Andrew Elliott (Eng)
Player of the match: Maria Castiñeiras (Arg)

- Chile won the toss and elected to field.
- Sofia Mardones (Chi) made her T20I debut.

=== 3rd T20I ===
15 October 2023
14:30
Scorecard

Argentina; 333/1 (20 overs)	v	Chile; 22 (10.4 overs)
Maria Castiñeiras 155 (77); Camila Valdes 1/62 (4 overs)		Emilia Toro 1 (14); Albertina Galan 3/0 (2 overs)

Argentina won by 311 runs
St Albans Club, Buenos Aires
Umpires: Santiago Duggan (Arg) and Andrew Elliott (Eng)
Player of the match: Maria Castiñeiras (Arg)

- Argentina won the toss and elected to bat.

== Gallery ==
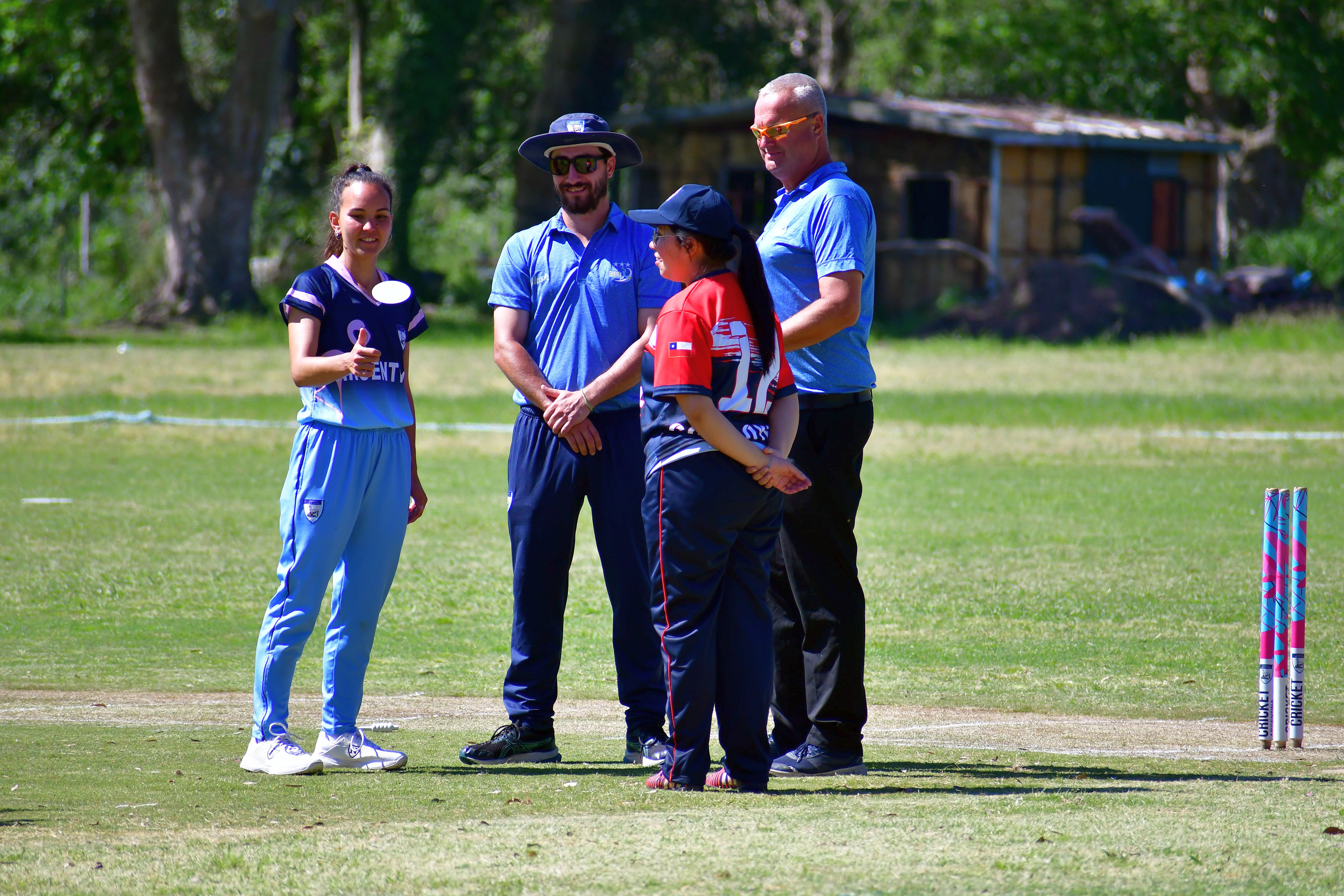
Alison Stocks and Camila Valdes during the toss of the first match.

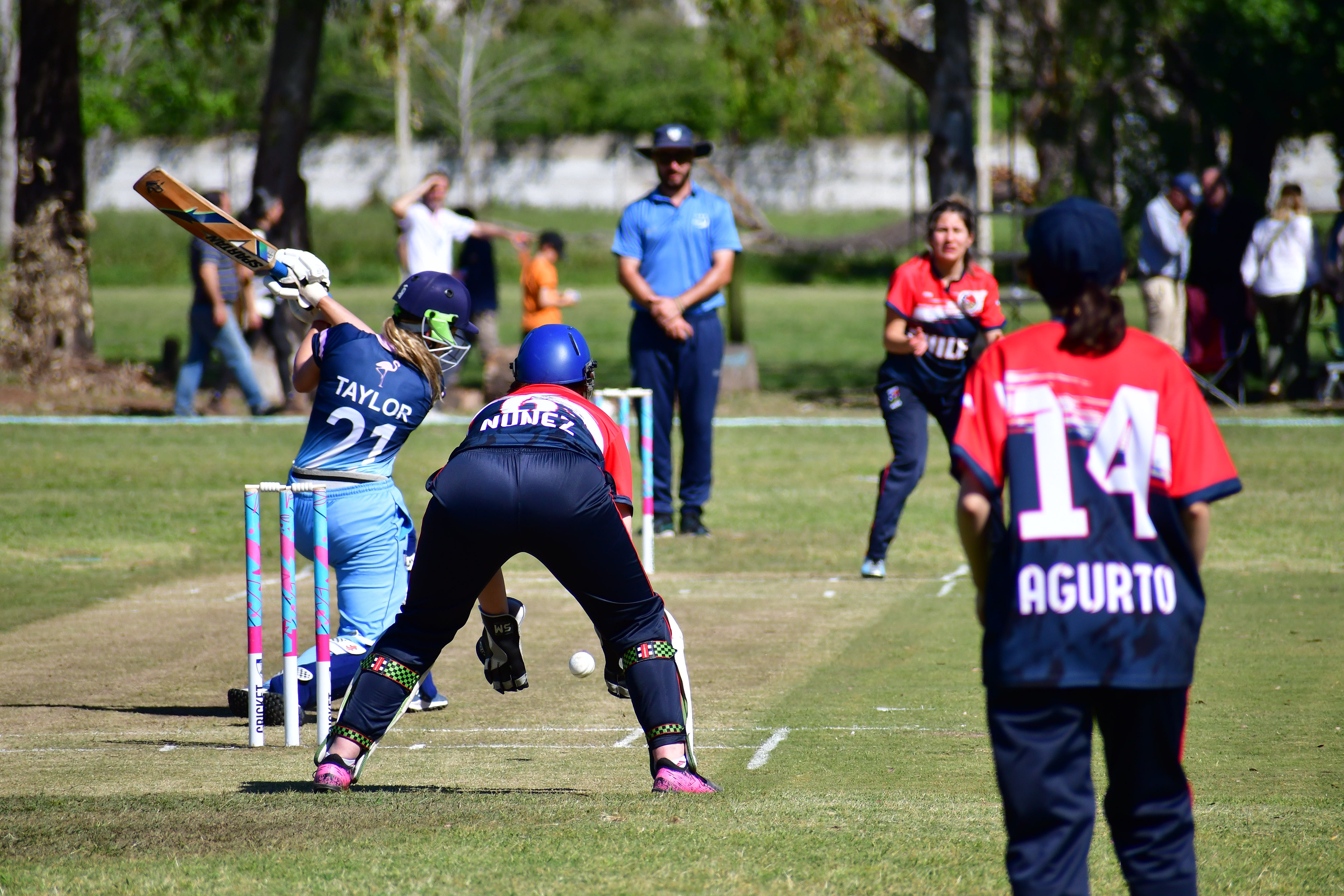
Lucia Taylor batting.

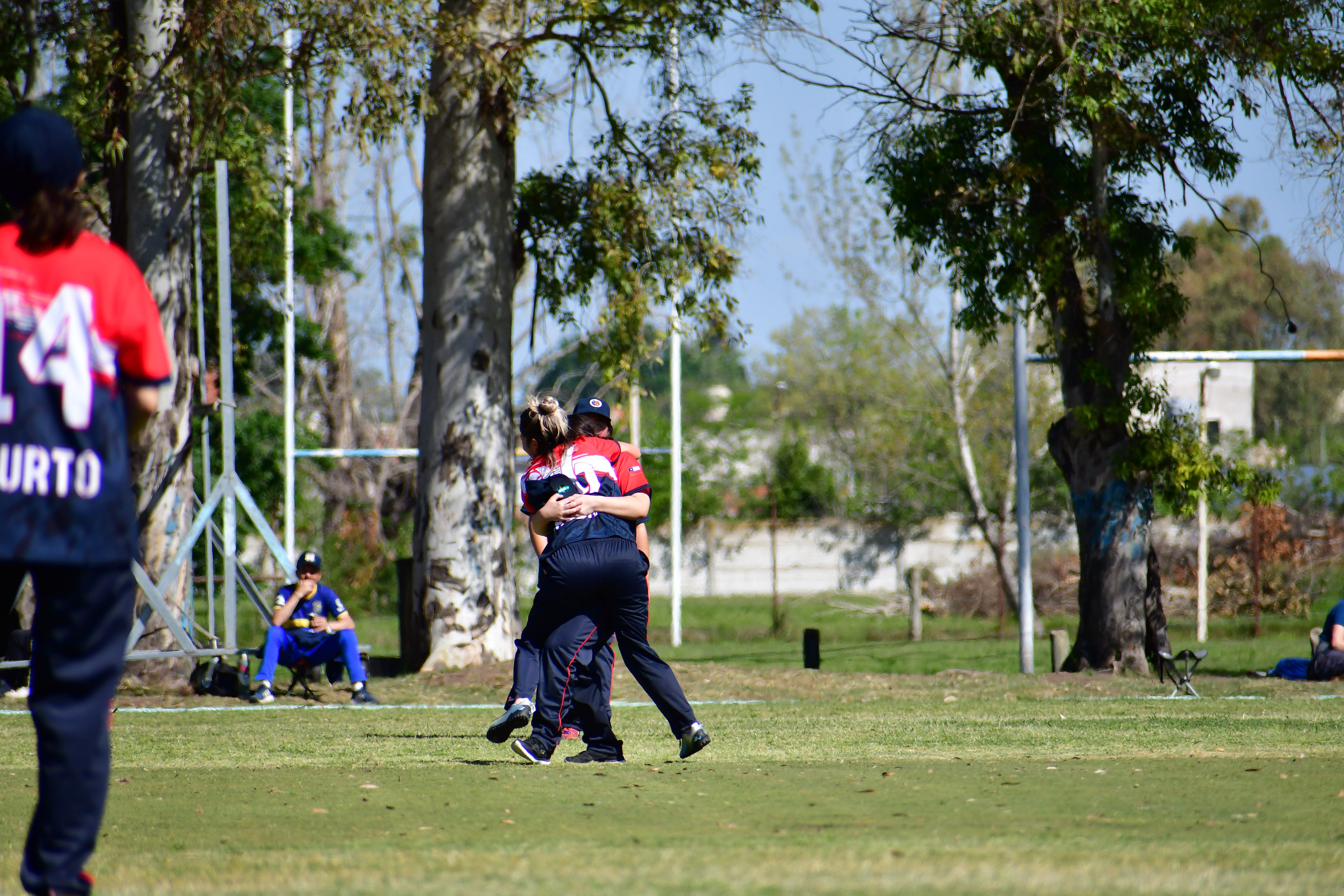
Chilean players celebrating their first wicket.

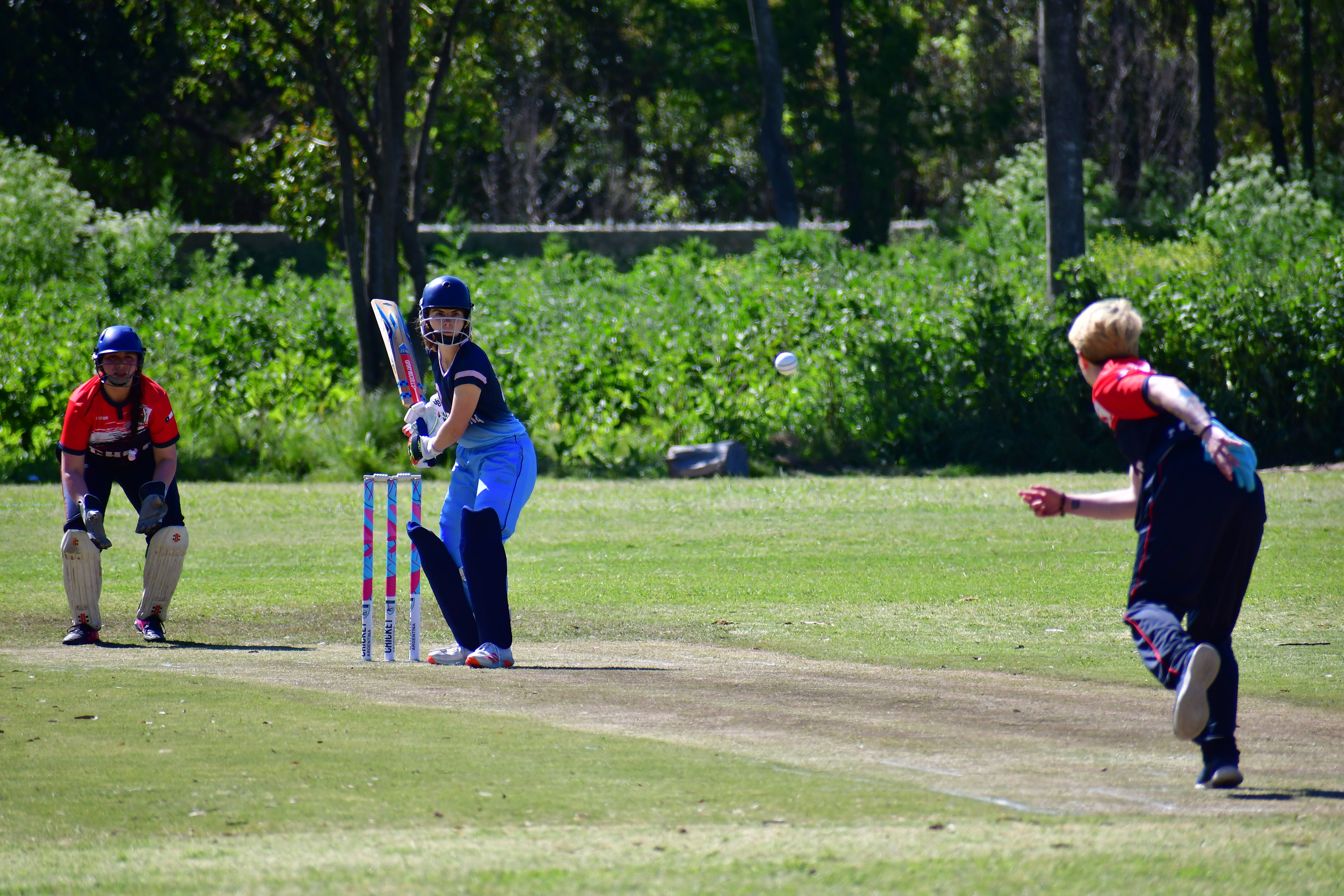
Jessica Miranda bowling against Albertina Galan.

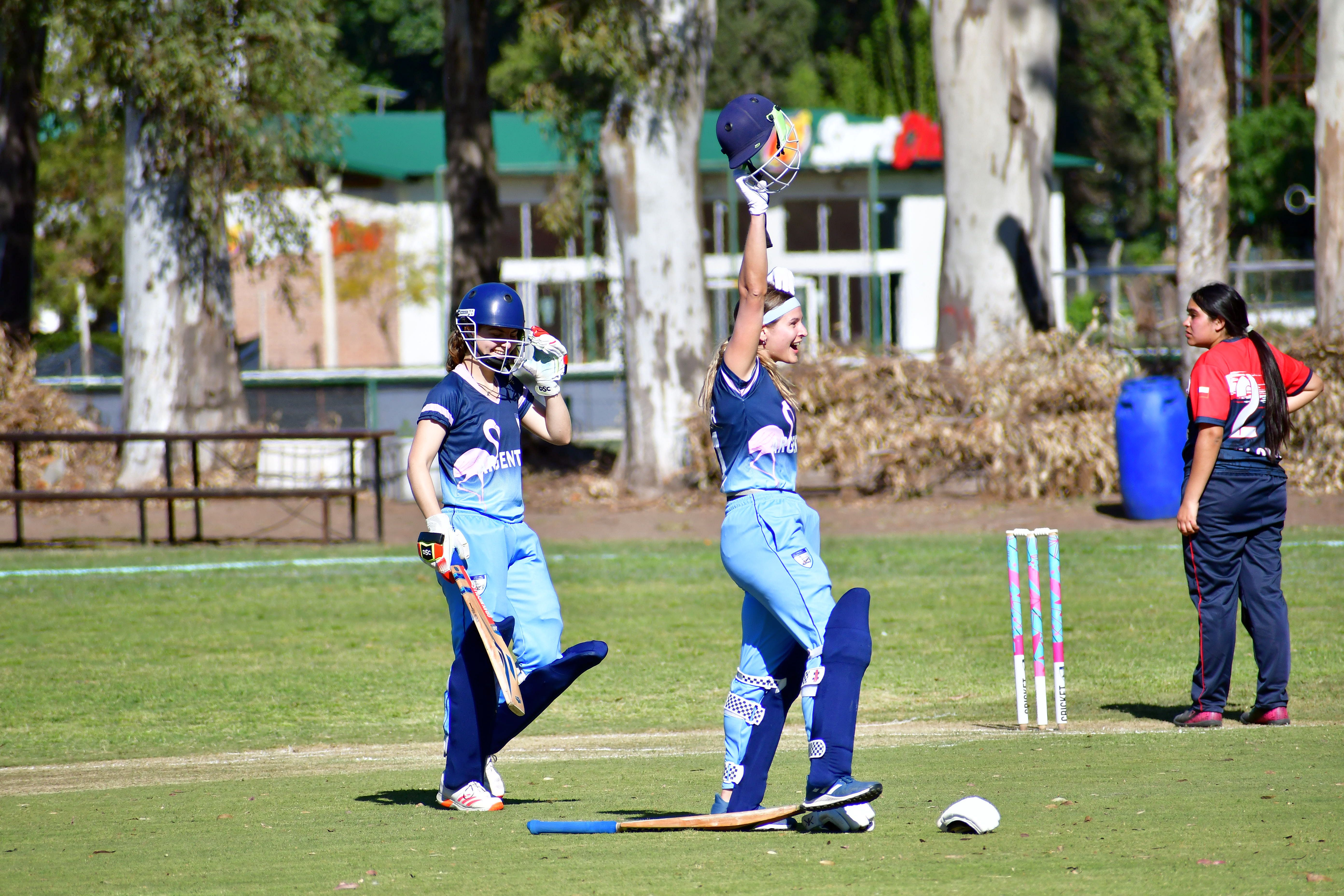
Albertina Galan and Lucia Taylor celebrating after breaking the record of highest score in T20I.
