= Amna Sharif Tariq =

International cricketer

Amna Tariq
Personal information
- Full name: Amna Sharif Tariq
- Born: 19 April 1989 (age 37); Kuwait
- Batting: Right-handed
- Bowling: Right-arm leg-break

International information
- National side: Kuwait
- T20I debut (cap 1): 18 February 2019 v Malaysia
- Last T20I: 30 October 2024 v Myanmar
- Source: Cricinfo, 30 October 2024

Amna Sharif Tariq (born April 19, 1989) is an international cricketer, a right-handed batter, a right-arm leg-break bowler, and captain of the Kuwait women's national cricket team.

== Domestic career ==
Along with her debut in 2013, Amna was declared the best batswoman along with Maryam Omar in the women's cricket competition held at Sulaibiya, Kuwait. She has served as a captain in the domestic games on many occasions and went on to be named the full-time captain of the national team in 2020. Since then, Amna has represented and led Kuwait in various international tournaments. Under her captaincy, Kuwait won its first ICC-affiliated T20I triangular tournament in 2020 in Qatar. The tournament was played by Qatar, Oman, and Kuwait.

== International career ==
In 2016, Amna was selected in the Kuwait women's national cricket team to participate in the first-ever nine-day UAE International Women's T20 tournament in Sharjah. She later participated in the ICC Women's Qualifier Asia 2019, which was held in Bangkok, Thailand. In November 2021, Kuwait participated for the second time in ICC World Cup qualifiers held in Dubai at the ICC academy, though they lost all matches but they did show progress as a team. The team later improved their performances at the Gulf Cup 2022 (Oman) and Asia Cup Qualifiers 2022 (Malaysia). Under Amna's captaincy, Kuwait won against Bhutan in ACC Women's T20 Championship 2022. She also took the wicket of Bhutan women's national cricket team's Ngawang Choden in the 13th over.

Amna was also among the seven women players who were shortlisted by the Kuwait Cricket Board for national contracts for 2021 based on ICC's eligibility, performance, talent, fitness, attitude, discipline, and prospects of continued residency in the State of Kuwait for stability and consistency in the women's national squad.
