= List of Bhutan women Twenty20 International cricketers =

This is a list of Bhutanese women Twenty20 International cricketers. A Twenty20 International (T20I) is an international cricket match between two representative teams, each having T20I status, as determined by the International Cricket Council (ICC). A T20I is played under the rules of Twenty20 cricket.

This list includes all players who have played at least one T20I match for Bhutan and is initially arranged in the order of debut appearance. Where more than one player won their first cap in the same match, those players are initially listed alphabetically at the time of debut.

== Key ==
General

- ‡ – Captain
- † – Wicket-keeper
- First – Year of debut
- Last – Year of latest game
- Mat – Number of matches played

Batting

- Runs – Runs scored in career
- HS – Highest score
- Avg – Runs scored per dismissal
- * – Batsman remained not out
- 50 – Number of half centuries

Bowling

- Wkt – Wickets taken in career
- BBI – Best bowling in an innings
- Ave – Average runs per wicket

Fielding

- Ca – Catches taken
- St – Stumpings affected

== Player ==
Last updated 6 June 2026.

General					Batting				Bowling				Fielding		Ref
Cap	Name	First	Last	Mat	Runs	HS	Avg	50	Balls	Wkt	BBI	Ave	Ca	St	Ref
1	Ritshi Choden	2019	2026	27	74	22*	8.22	0	485	25	3/12	16.60	0	0	
2	Sonam Choden	2019	2026	41	273	29	10.50	0	260	7	3/11	39.57	15	0	
3	Yeshey Choden‡	2019	2025	33	200	20*	6.89	0	55	5	2/3	11.40	6	0	
4	Karma Dema	2019	2026	33	213	41	8.19	0	–	–	–	–	7	0	
5	Anju Gurung	2019	2026	43	77	15	4.05	0	936	42	3/6	14.76	4	0	
6	Sonam Paldon†	2019	2026	18	125	28	8.92	0	–	–	–	–	2	4	
7	Pemma Seldon†	2019	2022	13	52	18	4.72	0	–	–	–	–	4	0	
8	Dechen Wangmo‡	2019	2025	37	661	64*	22.79	2	315	17	4/8	16.35	13	0	
9	Yeshey Wangmo‡	2019	2021	7	47	15	9.40	0	18	0	–	–	1	0	
10	Tshering Yangchen (Note: Tshering Yangchen also played Twenty20 International matches for Kuwait. Only her record for Bhutan is given above.)	2019	2021	3	1	1*	–	0	18	0	–	–	0	0	
11	Tshering Zangmo	2019	2026	41	472	55	14.75	1	789	37	3/16	16.67	3	0	
12	Tashi Lhaden	2019	2022	5	2	1	0.50	0	90	0	–	–	1	0	
13	Ngawang Choden	2019	2026	40	675	78*	18.24	2	168	11	3/5	11.00	9	6	
14	Thukten Dema	2019	2019	1	2	2*	–	0	–	–	–	–	1	0	
15	Karma Samten	2021	2021	5	4	2*	4.00	0	105	3	2/9	26.66	2	0	
16	Tashi Cheki	2021	2022	8	0	0*	0.00	0	123	7	2/15	18.85	1	0	
17	Sangay Wangmo	2022	2024	3	3	2*	3.00	0	–	–	–	–	0	0	
18	Sonam	2022	2026	34	84	23	4.94	0	561	28	4/13	19.25	4	0	
19	Dechen Zangmo	2022	2022	1	–	–	–	–	24	1	1/10	10.00	0	0	
20	Anjuli Ghalley	2023	2024	8	4	4	2.00	0	96	4	3/12	19.25	1	0	
21	Chado Om	2023	2026	25	75	25	9.37	0	48	3	2/23	17.33	0	0	
22	Kinley Bidha	2023	2024	3	0	0	0.00	0	48	0	–	–	0	0	
23	Tshering Choden	2023	2026	16	23	21	5.75	0	179	8	3/13	20.50}	1	0	
24	Eva Yangzom	2024	2025	5	–	–	–	–	18	0	–	–	0	0	
25	Sangay Zangmo	2024	2024	4	1	1*	–	0	–	–	–	–	0	0	
26	Sonam Palden	2024	2024	4	1	1	1.00	0	–	–	–	–	0	0	
26	Tshering Choden	2024	2025	1	–	–	–	–	–	–	–	–	1	0	
27	Sangay Yangzom	2025	2026	3	1	1*	–	0	24	0	–	–	1	0	
28	Riya Pradhan	2025	2026	8	–	–	–	–	150	8	2/7	18.12	1	0	
29	Mamta Rai	2026	2026	1	0	0	0.00	0	–	–	–	–	0	0	
30	Samjhana Mongar	2026	2026	1	–	–	–	–	6	0	–	–	0	0	
