= Deepika Rasangika =

Sri Lankan cricketer

Personal information
- Born: 13 December 1983 (age 42); Colombo, Sri Lanka
- Batting: Left-handed

International information
- National sides: Sri Lanka (2008–2014); Bahrain (2022–2025)
- ODI debut (cap 40): 2 May 2008; Sri Lanka v Pakistan
- Last ODI: 23 January 2014; Sri Lanka v India
- T20I debut (cap 9/9): 12 June 2009; Sri Lanka v Pakistan
- Last T20I: 16 December 2025; Bahrain v Qatar

Career statistics
Competition	WODI	WT20I
Matches	31	59
Runs scored	473	1163
Batting average	18.19	30.60
100s/50s	0/2	1/2
Top score	84	161*
Balls bowled	102	498
Wickets	4	19
Bowling average	20.50	29.63
5 wickets in innings	0	0
10 wickets in match	0	0
Best bowling	4/38	3/9
Catches/stumpings	9/–	11/–
- Source: Cricinfo, 16 December 2025

Deepika Rasangika (born 13 December 1983) is a Sri Lankan-born international cricketer who now plays for the Bahrain women's cricket team.

Rasangika played in more than 60 matches for the Sri Lanka women's cricket team from 2008 to 2014. She was named in Sri Lanka's squad for the 2009 Women's Cricket World Cup.

Rasangika moved to Bahrain in 2017 to take up a position at a local coaching academy.

In March 2022, she was named in Bahrain's squad for the 2022 GCC Women's Gulf Cup in Oman. She made her Women's Twenty20 International (WT20I) debut for Bahrain against Oman, in the opening match of that tournament. On 22 March 2022, in Bahrain's match against Saudi Arabia, Rasangika scored 161 not out from just 66 balls. She became the first cricketer for Bahrain to score a century in WT20Is, as well as racking up the highest individual score in a WT20I match.
