= Kuwait women's national cricket team =

Cricket team

Kuwait
- Flag of Kuwait
- Association: Cricket Kuwait

International Cricket Council
- ICC status: Associate member (2005); Affiliate member (1998)
- ICC region: Asia
ICC Rankings	Current	Best-ever
T20I	48th	30th (19 Feb 2020)

International cricket
- First international: v China at Kuala Lumpur; 3 July 2009

T20 Internationals
- First T20I: v Malaysia at Asian Institute of Technology Ground, Bangkok; 18 February 2019
- Last T20I: v Singapore at Selangor Turf Club, Kuala Lumpur; 6 June 2026
T20Is	Played	Won/Lost
Total	63	21/40 (0 ties, 2 no results)
This year	5	2/3 (0 ties, 0 no results)
- As of 6 June 2026

The Kuwait women's national cricket team represents Kuwait in international women's cricket. The team is organised by Cricket Kuwait, which has been a member of the International Cricket Council (ICC) since 1998.

The Kuwait women's cricket team made its international debut at the 2009 ACC Women's Twenty20 Championship in Malaysia. The team failed to win any of its matches in the group stage, and also lost to Qatar in the eleventh-place play-off, thus finishing twelfth and last overall. Kuwait had greater success at the tournament's 2011 edition, however, placing fourth of five teams in their group and then going on to defeat Bhutan in the seventh-place play-off. At the 2013 ACC Women's Championship, where matches were played over 25 overs, Kuwait won only a single game, against Singapore, and were ranked last of the eleven participants. Outside of Asian Cricket Council (ACC) tournaments, the team also competed in the inaugural edition of the Gulf Cricket Council (GCC) Women's Twenty20 Championship in 2014. They lost to the United Arab Emirates, and did not return for the following year's tournament, owing to scheduling conflict.

In April 2018, the ICC granted full Women's Twenty20 International (WT20I) status to all its members. Therefore, all Twenty20 matches played between Kuwait women and another international side after 1 July 2018 have the full WT20I status. Kuwait made their Twenty20 International debut against Malaysia in the 2019 ICC Women's Qualifier Asia at Bangkok on 18 February 2019.

In December 2020, the ICC announced the qualification pathway for the 2023 ICC Women's T20 World Cup. Kuwait were named in the 2021 ICC Women's T20 World Cup Asia Qualifier regional group, alongside seven other teams.

== Tournament history ==
=== ICC Women's World Cup ===
World Cup record
Year	Round	Position	GP	W	L	T	NR
(England) 1973	Did not qualify/No women's ODI status						
(India) 1978	Did not qualify/No women's ODI status						
(New Zealand) 1982	Did not qualify/No women's ODI status						
(Australia) 1988	Did not qualify/No women's ODI status						
(England) 1993	Did not qualify/No women's ODI status						
(India) 1997	Did not qualify/No women's ODI status						
(New Zealand) 2000	Did not qualify/No women's ODI status						
(South Africa) 2005	Did not qualify/No women's ODI status						
(Australia) 2009	Did not qualify/No women's ODI status						
(India) 2013	Did not qualify/No women's ODI status						
(England) 2017	Did not qualify/No women's ODI status						
(New Zealand) 2022	Did not qualify/No women's ODI status						
(India) 2025	To be determined						
Total	0/12	0 Titles	0	0	0	0	0

=== ICC T20 World Cup ===
ICC T20 World Cup records
Year/Host	Round	Position	GP	W	L	T	NR
(South Africa) 2007	Did not qualify						
(England) 2009	Did not qualify						
(Cricket West Indies) 2010	Did not qualify						
(Sri Lanka) 2012	Did not qualify						
(Bangladesh) 2014	Did not qualify						
(India) 2016	Did not qualify						
(United Arab Emirates) (Oman) 2021	Did not qualify						
(Australia) 2022	Did not qualify						
(United States) (Cricket West Indies) 2024	Did not qualify						
(India) (Sri Lanka) 2026	To be determined						
Total	0/9	0	0	0	0	0	0

=== ACC Women's Premier Cup ===
ACC Women's Premier Cup records
Year	Round	Position	GP	W	L	T	NR
(Malaysia) 2024	Quarter-finals	8/16	4	2	2	0	0
Total	1/1	0 Titles	4	2	2	0	0

=== ACC Women's T20 Championship ===
ACC Women's T20 Championship records
Year	Round	Position	GP	W	L	T	NR
(Malaysia) 2009	Group stages	12/12	6	0	6	0	0
(Kuwait) 2011	Group stages	7/10	5	2	3	0	0
(Thailand) 2013	Group stages	11/11	5	1	4	0	0
(Malaysia) 2022	Group stages	–	4	1	2	0	1
Total	4/4	0 Titles	20	4	15	0	1

=== Cricket at Summer Olympics Games ===
Cricket at Summer Olympics records
Host Year	Round	Position	GP	W	L	T	NR
(United States) 2028	To be determined						
(Australia) 2032	To be determined						
Total	–	0 Title	0	0	0	0	0

=== ICC Women's World Twenty20 Asia Qualifier ===
ICC Women's World Twenty20 Asia Qualifier records
Year	Round	Position	GP	W	L	T	NR
(Thailand) 2017	Did not participate						
(Thailand) 2019	Round-robin	7/7	6	0	6	0	0
(United Arab Emirates) 2021	Round-robin	6/6	5	0	5	0	0
(Malaysia) 2023	Group stages	–	4	2	1	0	1
(Thailand) 2025	Group stages	–	4	1	2	0	1
Total	4/4	0 Titles	19	3	14	0	2

== Current squad ==
This lists all the players who played for Kuwait in the past 12 months or were named in the most recent squad.

Name	Age	Batting style	Bowling style	Notes
Batters
Balasubramani Shanti	39	Right-handed	Right-arm leg spin	
Siobhan Gomez	34	Right-handed	Right-arm medium	
Zeefa Jilani	19	Right-handed	Right-arm medium	
Maryyam Ashraf	28	Right-handed	Right-arm medium	
Glenda Menezes	42	Right-handed	Right-arm medium	
Raelyn D'Souza	18	Right-handed		
All-rounders
Priyada Murali	33	Right-handed	Right-arm medium	
Amna Sharif Tariq	37	Right-handed	Right-arm off spin	Captain
Khadija Khalil	32	Right-handed	Right-arm medium	
Maryam Omar	33	Right-handed	Right-arm off spin	
Wicket-keepers
Suchitha D'Sa	36	Right-handed		
Iqra Ishaq		Right-handed		
Bhavani Yekkeli	31	Right-handed		
Spin Bowler
Mariamma Hyder	41	Left-handed	Slow left-arm orthodox	
Pace Bowlers
Maria Jasvi	25	Right-handed	Right-arm medium	
Candice Dias	18	Right-handed	Right-arm medium	
Madeeha Zuberi	26	Right-handed	Right-arm medium	

Updated on 30 Oct 2024.

== Records and statistics ==
International Match Summary — Kuwait Women

Last updated 6 June 2026

Playing Record
Format	M	W	L	T	NR	Inaugural Match
Twenty20 Internationals	63	21	40	0	2	18 February 2019

=== Twenty20 International ===
- Highest team total: 136/9 v. Myanmar on 22 October 2024 at Singapore National Cricket Ground, Singapore.
- Highest individual score: 77, Zeefa Jilani v. Myanmar on 22 October 2024 at Singapore National Cricket Ground, Singapore.
- Best individual bowling figures: 5/6, Maria Jasvi v. Saudi Arabia on 20 March 2022 at Oman Cricket Academy Ground Turf 2, Muscat.

T20I record versus other nations

Records complete to WT20I #2826. Last updated 6 June 2026.

Opponent	M	W	L	T	NR	First match	First win
ICC Associate members
Bahrain	3	1	1	0	1	25 March 2020	13 December 2025
Bhutan	4	2	2	0	0	22 November 2021	21 June 2022
China	2	1	1	0	0	21 February 2019	31 August 2023
Hong Kong	6	0	6	0	0	25 February 2019	
Indonesia	1	0	1	0	0	4 June 2026	
Malaysia	8	0	8	0	0	18 February 2019	
Myanmar	8	5	3	0	0	6 September 2023	6 September 2023
Nepal	5	0	5	0	0	27 February 2019	
Oman	5	2	3	0	0	18 January 2020	18 January 2020
Qatar	4	3	1	0	0	17 January 2020	19 January 2020
Saudi Arabia	2	2	0	0	0	20 March 2020	20 March 2022
Singapore	5	5	0	0	0	10 February 2024	10 February 2024
Thailand	5	0	4	0	1	24 February 2019	
United Arab Emirates	5	0	5	0	0	19 February 2019	

== See also ==
- List of Kuwait women Twenty20 International cricketers
