= Oman Cricket Academy Ground =

Cricket ground

- Interactive map of Oman Cricket Academy Ground

Ground information
- Location: Muscat, Oman
- Coordinates: 23°29′17″N 58°29′38″E
- Establishment: 2012; 14 years ago
- Capacity: 4,700
- Owner: Oman Cricket
- Operator: Oman national cricket team
- Tenants: Oman national cricket team

International information
- First ODI: 5 January 2020: Oman v United Arab Emirates
- Last ODI: 8 February 2022: Oman v United Arab Emirates
- First T20I: 20 January 2019: Bahrain v Saudi Arabia
- Last T20I: 16 October 2025: Qatar v Samoa
- First WT20I: 4 February 2020: Oman v Germany
- Last WT20I: 6 February 2026: Oman v Denmark
- As of 6 February 2026; Source: Cricinfo; CricketArchive

Oman Cricket Academy Ground
- Interactive map of Oman Cricket Academy Ground

Ground information
- Location: Muscat, Oman
- Establishment: 2012; 14 years ago
- Capacity: 2,000-3,000
- Owner: Oman Cricket
- Operator: Oman Cricket
- Tenants: Oman national cricket team

International information
- First ODI: 6 September 2021: Papua New Guinea v United States
- Last ODI: 28 September 2021: Oman v Scotland
- First T20I: 20 January 2019: Kuwait v Maldives
- Last T20I: 15 October 2025: Japan v Qatar
- First WT20I: 20 March 2022: Oman v Bahrain
- Last WT20I: 7 February 2026: Oman v Denmark
- As of 7 February 2026; Source: Cricinfo Ministry Turf 2

Oman Cricket Academy Ground, also known as the Al Amerat Cricket Stadium, is a cricket ground in Al Amarat, south of Muscat, Oman. The ground is owned by the Oman Cricket Board. In January 2021, the International Cricket Council (ICC) gave accreditation for the Ministry Turf 1 at the stadium to host Test cricket.

== History ==
In July 2008, Oman Cricket Board announced plans to construct an international-standard facility at Al Amarat, about 15 kilometres south-east of the centre of the city of Muscat. The cost of the project was initially estimated at 2 million Omani rials (US$5.2 million), with the land donated by the Ministry of Sports Affairs and the rest of the funding to be raised through corporate sponsorship. The venue, known as the Al Amerat Cricket Stadium, was inaugurated in October 2012, by Ashraful Haque, the chief executive of the Asian Cricket Council. It held its first match – a club game – two months later. Floodlights were installed at the venue in 2015, and there are plans for an indoor academy to be built, to complement the existing academy at the Sultan Qaboos Sports Complex. Oman Cricket Board later announced the construction of pavilions and an indoor state-of-the-art training facility that also houses the Oman Cricket Board headquarters.

The venue hosted the 2019 ACC Western Region T20, followed by the Oman Quadrangular Series in February 2019. Matches played in both events had Twenty20 International (T20I) status.

On 21 January 2019, in a match between the Maldives and Bahrain, the Maldivian bowler Ibrahim Hassan took the first T20I five-wicket haul on this ground.

On 23 January 2019, in a match between Kuwait and Bahrain, Kuwait's Ravija Sandaruwan scored the first T20I century on this ground.

In October 2019, a Pentangular T20 Series between ICC associate sides with ODI status, Oman, Ireland, Nepal and the Netherlands in addition to Hong Kong (not ODI status) was held at the venue. Home side Oman won all 4 of their matches to win the series including beating Nepal in the final game, having dismissed them for 64 runs, the lowest score ever at the stadium.

In November 2019, first round of Cricket World Cup Challenge League B was scheduled to take place in Hong Kong. However, citing the instability in Hong Kong, all the matches were moved to this venue.

In February 2020, it hosted 2020 ACC Western Region T20. The stadium hosted the 2021 ICC Men's T20 World Cup along with the UAE due to rising COVID-19 cases in India. Following the qualification to host the 2021 ICC Men's T20 World Cup, the Al Amerat Turf 1 underwent major upgrade with the addition of new floodlights and pavilions. It is expected to have a seating capacity of 4000, including VIP and VVIP seating along with dedicated commentary boxes. The scoreboard was also upgraded to a digital scoreboard. Six matches were played at the stadium during the first-round stage of the tournament, including all three of Oman's matches.

== International record ==
=== Ministry Turf 1 ===
==== One-Day International centuries ====
The following table summarizes the centuries scored in ODIs at this venue.

No.	Score	Player	Team	Balls	Innings	Opposing team	Date	Result
1	129*	Craig Williams	Namibia	94	1	Oman	8 January 2020	Won
2	173*	Jaskaran Malhotra	United States	124	1	Papua New Guinea	9 September 2021	Won
3	100	Monank Patel	United States	114	1	Nepal	13 September 2021	Lost
4	107	Jatinder Singh (1/2)	Oman	62	1	Nepal	14 September 2021	Won
5	106	Jatinder Singh (2/2)	Oman	95	1	United Arab Emirates	5 February 2022	Lost
6	115	Chirag Suri	United Arab Emirates	125	2	Oman	5 February 2022	Won

==== One-Day International five-wicket hauls ====
The following table summarizes the five-wicket hauls taken in ODIs at this venue.

#	Figures	Player	Country	Innings	Opponent	Date	Result
1	5/44	JJ Smit	Namibia	2	Oman	8 January 2020	Won
2	5/26	Ahmed Raza	United Arab Emirates	2	Namibia	9 January 2020	Won
3	6/11	Sandeep Lamichhane	Nepal	2	Papua New Guinea	10 September 2021	Won
4	5/15	Khawar Ali	Oman	1	Papua New Guinea	1 October 2021	Won
5	5/28	Kabua Morea	Papua New Guinea	2	Oman	1 October 2021	Lost
6	5/17	Basil Hameed	United Arab Emirates	1	Oman	6 February 2022	Won

==== Twenty20 International centuries ====
Two T20I centuries have been scored at the venue.

No.	Score	Player	Team	Balls	Innings	Opposing team	Date	Result
1	124	Kevin O'Brien	Ireland	62	1	Hong Kong	7 October 2019	Won
2	112	Muhammad Waseem	United Arab Emirates	66	2	Ireland	24 February 2022	Won
3	109*	Aaron Johnson	Canada	69	1	Oman	16 November 2022	Won

==== Twenty20 International five-wicket hauls ====
The following table summarizes the five-wicket hauls taken in T20Is at this venue.

#	Figures	Player	Country	Innings	Opponent	Date	Result
1	5/24	Ibrahim Hassan	Maldives	2	Bahrain	21 January 2019	Lost
2	5/15	Aamir Kaleem (1/2)	Oman	1	Nepal	10 October 2019	Won
3	5/29	Aamir Kaleem (2/2)	Oman	1	United Arab Emirates	14 February 2022	Won
4	5/19	Ahmed Raza	United Arab Emirates	2	Nepal	22 February 2022	Won

==== Women's Twenty20 International centuries ====
Two WT20I centuries has been scored at the venue.

No.	Score	Player	Team	Balls	Innings	Opposing team	Date	Result
1	104*	Shahreen Bahadur	Qatar	61	1	Saudi Arabia	25 March 2022	Won
2	113*	Aysha	Qatar	58	1	Saudi Arabia	25 March 2022	Won

==== Women's Twenty20 International five-wicket hauls ====
The following table summarizes the five-wicket hauls taken in WT20Is at this venue.

#	Figures	Player	Country	Innings	Opponent	Date	Result
1	5/11	Amanda Dcosta	Oman	2	Kuwait	24 March 2022	Won

=== Ministry Turf 2 ===
==== Twenty20 International centuries ====
Three T20I centuries have been scored at the venue.

No.	Score	Player	Team	Balls	Innings	Opposing team	Date	Result
1	103	Ravija Sandaruwan	Kuwait	59	2	Bahrain	23 January 2019	Won
2	108*	Matthew Spoors	Canada	66	1	Philippines	18 February 2022	Won
3	104*	Kushal Bhurtel	Nepal	61	1	Philippines	19 February 2022	Won

==== Twenty20 International five-wicket hauls ====
One five-wicket haul has been taken in T20Is at this venue.

#	Figures	Player	Country	Innings	Opponent	Date	Result
1	5/5	Junaid Aziz	Bahrain	1	Germany	18 February 2022	Won

==== Women's Twenty20 International centuries ====
Two WT20I centuries have been scored at the venue.

No.	Score	Player	Team	Balls	Innings	Opposing team	Date	Result
1	161*	Deepika Rasangika	Bahrain	66	1	Saudi Arabia	22 March 2022	Won
2	158*	Esha Oza	United Arab Emirates	71	1	Bahrain	26 March 2022	Won

==== Women's Twenty20 International five-wicket hauls ====
One five-wicket haul has been taken in WT20Is at this venue.

#	Figures	Player	Country	Innings	Opponent	Date	Result
1	5/6	Maria Jasvi	Kuwait	1	Saudi Arabia	20 March 2022	Won
