= Saudi Arabia women's national cricket team =

Cricket team

Saudi Arabia
- Flag of Saudi Arabia
- Association: Saudi Arabian Cricket Federation

International Cricket Council
- ICC status: Associate member (2016); Affiliate member (2003)
- ICC region: Asia

T20 Internationals
- First T20I: v. Kuwait at Oman Cricket Academy Ground Turf 2, Muscat; 20 March 2022
- Last T20I: v. China at UKM-YSD Cricket Oval, Bangi; 9 June 2026
T20Is	Played	Won/Lost
Total	14	0/13 (0 ties, 1 no result)
This year	4	0/3 (0 ties, 1 no result)
- As of 9 June 2026

The Saudi Arabia national women's cricket team is the team that represents Saudi Arabia in international women's cricket. In April 2018, the International Cricket Council (ICC) granted full Women's Twenty20 International (WT20I) status to all its members. Therefore, all Twenty20 matches played between Saudi Arabia women and other ICC members after 1 July 2018 will be a full WT20I. Saudi Arabia played their first official WT20I matches in March 2022 during the 2022 GCC Women's Gulf Cup.

== Records and statistics ==
International Match Summary — Saudi Arabia Women

Last updated 9 June 2026

Playing Record
Format	M	W	L	T	NR	Inaugural Match
Twenty20 Internationals	14	0	13	0	1	20 March 2022

=== Twenty20 International ===
T20I record versus other nations

Records complete to WT20I #2835. Last updated 9 June 2026.

Opponent	M	W	L	T	NR	First match	First win
ICC Associate members
Bahrain	2	0	2	0	0	22 March 2022	
China	1	0	0	0	1	9 June 2026	
Kuwait	2	0	2	0	0	20 March 2022	
Oman	3	0	3	0	0	21 March 2022	
Philippines	1	0	1	0	0	4 June 2026	
Qatar	2	0	2	0	0	25 March 2022	
United Arab Emirates	3	0	3	0	0	24 March 2022	

== See also ==
- List of Saudi Arabia women Twenty20 International cricketers
