= Kuwait Cricket =

Kuwait Cricket Club

Coordinates: 25°13′53″N 51°29′4″E

Kuwait Cricket Association إتحاد الكريكيت الكويتي
- Sport: Cricket
- Jurisdiction: Kuwait
- Founded: 1996
- Affiliation date: 1979
- Headquarters: Kuwait City
- Location: Kuwait
- President: Haider Farman
- Vice president: Faisal Al Marzouq
- Coach: Muthumudalige Pushpakumara
- Sponsor: Kuwait Swedish Cleaning Services; MECstudygroup; Hafiz Printing
- (Kuwait)

Kuwait Cricket Club is the official governing body for the game of cricket in Kuwait. It is an associate member of the International Cricket Council, a full member of the Asian Cricket Council and affiliated to Kuwait Olympic Committee. The Association was founded in 1996.

== History of cricket in Kuwait ==
- 1946: Cricket first played in Magwa between the Oil Company employees and those of the contracting companies.
- 1947: Magwa Cricket Club formed by Kuwait Oil Company senior staff. For a brief period known as the Kuwait Cricket Club.
- 1948: Magwa Cricket Club renamed the Hubara Cricket Club; its objective was to 'foster cricket in Kuwait'.
- 1951: The Ahmadi Township was built by the Wimpey and Motherwell Bridge Companies. The cricket-mad executives laid out a pitch and Hubara Club moved into the 'Oval'.

The Wimpey Trophy was inaugurated as a match between Hubara and the Contractors. This was the first trophy for cricket in Kuwait. This was later converted into the Wimpey League which included teams from outside Ahmadi. With the construction of a thatched-board hut as pavilion, Ahmadi became the home of cricket in Kuwait.

1950s: The Magnificent Merchants. A wider circle of participation and many tournaments came into being. This spread the game within Kuwait.

- The Tommy Tucker Trophy between Great Britain and the Commonwealth nations.
- In 1956 then New Ground was opened to accommodate the different leagues, series and playoffs.

1962: The Kuwait Oil Company built the present Pavilion and shortly after the sight screens and score boards were erected. Managing director H L Scott declared the brand new pavilion open.

- The Napier Bowl donated by Rolls-Royce was for the match between Hubara Wanderers and Hubara Nomads.

1970s: The Malhotras contributed a trophy for a league comprising the top two from Rahim and the bottom six from Wimpeys.

- The Jashanmal Trophy was renewed and the Acton-Wilson Trophy was instituted for the Under 40s versus the Over 40s.

1980s: Evergreen became the first team after Casuals winning all 13 matches of Wimpey League.

1990s: The Cricketing agenda as is currently in place. The Classic League Premier League, Challenge League, KBRC Trophy, GC/MK Electric League, KEC League are the top leagues and the Mirza Cup is the Knock Out Tournament.

2001:Gagira Perusinghe of Lanka Lions established a new world record claiming 9 dismissals behind the wicket of FedEx Cricket Club all 9 batsmen were 'stumped' . 2006: Unity Oval ground converted into grass and laid down the new proper Turf Pitch.

The International Flavor: Kuwait Cricket Teams regularly visited Cyprus and travelled to England, Switzerland, India, Pakistan besides other Gulf Countries.

- 1969: Tom Graveney's XI visited Kuwait with Clive Lloyd, Basil D'Oliveira, Freddie Truman, Glen Turner, Godfrey Evans.
- 1977: Air India XI visit Kuwait with Mohinder Amarnath, Sudinder Amarnath among others.
- 1980: Kuwait Wanderers Tour England and win the Rothman's Cup competing against Australia, England, Kenya and Holland.
- 1986: Pakistan vs World XI with Abdul Qadir, Ramiz Raja, Imran Khan, Wasim Akram, Arjuna Ranatunga, Ian Botham, Graham Rope & Martin Crows.
- 1995: Indian team played against Pakistan in Kuwait with Azharuddin, Sachin Tandulkar, Ravi Shastri, Sunil Gavaskar, Ramiz Raja, Salim Malik, Wasim Akram, Aaqib Javed
- In 1998 Faisal Al Marzouq who is a Kuwaiti cricketer became the first Kuwaiti national selected to captain the Kuwait national cricket team. His selection followed a successful spell as captain of the Gulf Bank cricket team, which won many tournaments under his leadership. Career as national captain
  - 1998: Led Kuwait on a tour of Pakistan, winning 3 matches against List A teams.
  - 2001: Captained Kuwait at the ACC tournament in Singapore, winning matches against other GCC teams.
  - 2003: Captained Kuwait to victory in the ACC Gulf Cup, hosted in Kuwait. Administration and honours After retiring as a player, he was elected vice president of the Kuwait Cricket Club (KCC), with the aim of developing cricket in Kuwait. He represents Kuwait on the ACC development committee. In 2022 he received the International Cricket Council's long service award.
- 2001: Kuwait Under 19 Participated in Youth Asia Cup in Kathmandu Nepal.
- Kuwait hosted first ever ICC under 13 Gulf Cup Kuwait team. Pratheesh Rajpal led them to the cup.
- 2004: Kuwait Senior National team Participated in ACC Trophy 2004 in Kuala Lumpur Malaysia.
- 2005: Kuwait Senior National team Participated in WCQS Div.2 held in Kuala Lumpur, Malaysia. * Kuwait under 19 team Participated in ACC U19 Trophy in Kathmandu Nepal.
- 2007:.
- Kuwait U19 Team participated in ACC U19 Cup (Elite Division) held in Kuala Lumpur Malaysia.

== Recognition by international associations ==
- 1996: Formation of the Kuwait Cricket Association
- 1997: Kuwait Olympic Committee
- 1998: International Cricket Council as Affiliate member
- 1998: Asian Cricket Council as Associate member
- 2005: ICC as Associate member
- 2006: ACC as Full member
