= Bahrain women's national cricket team =

Cricket team

Bahrain
- Flag of Bahrain
- Association: Bahrain Cricket Association

Personnel
- Captain: Deepika Rasangika

International Cricket Council
- ICC status: Associate member (2017); Affiliate member (2001)
- ICC region: Asia
ICC Rankings	Current	Best-ever
T20I	75th	44th (23-Dec-2022)

T20 Internationals
- First T20I: Oman at Oman Cricket Academy Ground Turf 2, Muscat; 20 March 2022
- Last T20I: Japan at Bayuemas Oval, Pandamaran; 7 June 2026
T20Is	Played	Won/Lost
Total	40	5/33 (0 ties, 2 no results)
This year	6	0/6 (0 ties, 0 no results)
- As of 7 June 2026

The Bahrain national women's cricket team represents Bahrain in international women's cricket. In April 2018, the International Cricket Council (ICC) granted full Women's Twenty20 International (WT20I) status to all its members. Therefore, all Twenty20 matches played between Bahrain women and other ICC members after 1 July 2018 have the full WT20I status.

== Tournament history ==
=== ICC Women's World Twenty20 Asia Qualifier ===
ICC Women's World Twenty20 Asia Qualifier records
Year	Round	Position	GP	W	L	T	NR
(Thailand) 2017	Did not participate						
(Thailand) 2019	Did not participate						
(United Arab Emirates) 2021	Did not participate						
(Malaysia) 2023	Group stages	–	5	1	3	0	1
(Thailand) 2025	DNQ	–	4	2	0	0	2
Total	2/5	0 Titles	9	3	3	0	3

=== ACC Women's Premier Cup ===
ACC Women's Premier Cup records
Year	Round	Position	GP	W	L	T	NR
(Malaysia) 2024	Group stages	–	3	0	3	0	0
Total	1/1	0 Titles	3	0	3	0	0

=== ACC Women's T20 Championship ===
ACC Women's T20 Championship records
Year	Round	Position	GP	W	L	T	NR
(Malaysia) 2009	Did not participate						
(Kuwait) 2011	Did not participate						
(Thailand) 2013	Did not participate						
(Malaysia) 2022	Group stages	–	4	0	3	0	0
Total	1/4	0 Titles	4	0	3	0	1

== Records and statistics ==
International Match Summary — Bahrain Women

Last updated 7 June 2026

Playing Record
Format	M	W	L	T	NR	Inaugural Match
Twenty20 Internationals	40	5	33	0	2	20 March 2022

=== Twenty20 International ===
- Highest team total: 318/1 v. Saudi Arabia on 22 March 2022 at Oman Cricket Academy Ground Turf 2, Muscat.
- Highest individual score: 161*, Deepika Rasangika v. Saudi Arabia on 22 March 2022 at Oman Cricket Academy Ground Turf 2, Muscat.
- Best innings bowling: 3/9, Deepika Rasangika v. Saudi Arabia on 22 March 2022 at Oman Cricket Academy Ground Turf 2, Muscat.

T20I record versus other nations

Records complete to WT20I #2830. Last updated 7 June 2026.

Opponent	M	W	L	T	NR	First match	First win
ICC Associate members
Bhutan	1	0	1	0	0	22 June 2022	
Hong Kong	2	0	1	0	1	19 June 2022	
Indonesia	1	0	1	0	0	11 February 2024	
Japan	1	0	1	0	0	7 June 2026	
Kuwait	3	1	1	0	1	25 March 2022	25 March 2022
Malaysia	2	0	2	0	0	3 September 2023	
Mongolia	1	0	1	0	0	6 June 2026	
Myanmar	1	0	1	0	0	3 June 2026	
Nepal	4	0	4	0	0	20 June 2022	
Oman	8	0	8	0	0	20 March 2022	
Qatar	10	2	8	0	0	21 March 2022	31 August 2023
Saudi Arabia	2	2	0	0	0	22 March 2022	22 March 2022
Thailand	1	0	1	0	0	4 June 2026	
United Arab Emirates	3	0	3	0	0	26 March 2022	

== See also ==
- Bahrain national cricket team
- List of Bahrain women Twenty20 International cricketers
