= List of Asian Games medalists in cricket =

This is the complete list of Asian Games medalists in cricket from 2010 to 2026.

== Men ==
Games	Gold	Silver	Bronze
2010 Guangzhou	Bangladesh (BAN); Mohammad Ashraful; Shamsur Rahman; Naeem Islam; Faisal Hossain; Shahadat Hossain; Mahbubul Alam; Nazmul Hossain; Mohammed Nazimuddin; Suhrawadi Shuvo; Dolar Mahmud; Mohammad Mithun; Nasir Hossain; Rony Talukdar; Shuvagata Hom; Sabbir Rahman	Afghanistan (AFG); Gulbadin Naib; Mohammad Shahzad; Sami Agha; Mohammad Nabi; Karim Sadiq; Shafiqullah; Mirwais Ashraf; Shabir Noori; Shapoor Zadran; Asghar Stanikzai; Samiullah Shinwari; Nawroz Mangal; Hamid Hassan; Aftab Alam	Pakistan (PAK); Khalid Latif; Azeem Ghumman; Naeemuddin; Mohammad Irshad; Lal Kumar; Sheharyar Ghani; Aizaz Cheema; Sarmad Bhatti; Naeem Anjum; Raza Hasan; Usman Qadir; Bilawal Bhatti; Akbar-ur-Rehman; Sharjeel Khan; Jalat Khan
2014 Incheon	Sri Lanka (SRI); Ashan Priyanjan; Jeevan Mendis; Kosala Kulasekara; Asela Gunaratne; Dinesh Chandimal; Shehan Jayasuriya; Dilhara Lokuhettige; Kithuruwan Vithanage; Upul Tharanga; Chaturanga de Silva; Lahiru Thirimanne; Alankara Asanka Silva; Ramith Rambukwella; Isuru Udana; Chathuranga Kumara	Afghanistan (AFG); Amir Hamza; Mohammad Nasim Baras; Mohammad Nabi; Mohammad Mujtaba; Gulbadin Naib; Fazal Rahman; Samiullah Shinwari; Qaseem Khan; Fareed Ahmad; Hamid Hassan; Mohammad Shahzad; Najeeb Tarakai; Abdullah Adil; Abdullah Mazari; Karim Sadiq	Bangladesh (BAN); Sabbir Rahman; Mashrafe Mortaza; Taskin Ahmed; Arafat Sunny; Mohammad Mithun; Shuvagata Hom; Ziaur Rahman; Tamim Iqbal; Mahmudullah; Rubel Hossain; Imrul Kayes; Shamsur Rahman; Anamul Haque; Nasir Hossain; Shakib Al Hasan
2022 Hangzhou	India (IND); Arshdeep Singh; Washington Sundar; Jitesh Sharma; Shivam Dube; Ruturaj Gaikwad; Rinku Singh; Shahbaz Ahmed; Mukesh Kumar; Rahul Tripathi; Ravi Bishnoi; Sai Kishore; Yashasvi Jaiswal; Avesh Khan; Tilak Varma; Prabhsimran Singh	Afghanistan (AFG); Nijat Masood; Karim Janat; Gulbadin Naib; Noor Ali Zadran; Sharafuddin Ashraf; Shahidullah; Sediqullah Atal; Qais Ahmad; Afsar Zazai; Sayed Shirzad; Fareed Ahmad; Zubaid Akbari; Wafiullah Tarakhil; Zahir Khan; Mohammad Shahzad	Bangladesh (BAN); Mrittunjoy Chowdhury; Sumon Khan; Nahid Rana; Parvez Hossain Emon; Ripon Mondol; Zakir Hasan; Saif Hassan; Jaker Ali; Afif Hossain; Yasir Ali; Rishad Hossain; Mahmudul Hasan Joy; Shahadat Hossain; Hasan Murad; Rakibul Hasan
2026 Aichi–Nagoya	India; Shreyas Iyer; Tilak Varma; Ravi Bishnoi; Jasprit Bumrah; Shivam Dube; Ishan Kishan; Vipraj Nigam; Axar Patel; Sanju Samson; Abhishek Sharma; Arshdeep Singh; Washington Sundar; Vaibhav Sooryavanshi; Yash Thakur	Pakistan; Sahibzada Farhan; Abdul Samad; Abrar Ahmed; Haider Ali; Saim Ayub; Ahmed Daniyal; Akif Javed; Usman Khan; Arafat Minhas; Saad Masood; Sufyan Moqim; Hasan Nawaz; Ali Raza; Maaz Sadaqat; Mohammad Wasim Jr.	Sri Lanka; Sahan Arachchige; Ashen Bandara; Lasith Croospulle; Keshan de Livera; Niroshan Dickwella; Binura Fernando; Nuwanidu Fernando; Tharindu Hansaka; Dushan Hemantha; Sineth Jayawardena; Chamika Karunaratne; Pramod Madushan; Wanuja Sahan; Nuwan Thushara; Vijayakanth Viyaskanth

== Women ==
Games	Gold	Silver	Bronze
2010 Guangzhou	Pakistan (PAK); Sana Mir; Batool Fatima; Nida Dar; Nahida Khan; Bismah Maroof; Nain Abidi; Asmavia Iqbal; Kainat Imtiaz; Marina Iqbal; Mariam Hasan; Sania Khan; Masooma Junaid; Sana Gulzar; Javeria Khan	Bangladesh (BAN); Rumana Ahmed; Salma Khatun; Shohely Akhter; Ayesha Akhter; Chamely Khatun; Tithy Sarkar; Panna Ghosh; Sultana Yesmin; Lata Mondal; Tazia Akhter; Ayasha Rahman; Jahanara Alam; Champa Chakma; Shathira Jakir; Fargana Hoque	Japan (JPN); Erina Kaneko; Yuka Yoshida; Shizuka Miyaji; Atsuko Suda; Yuko Saito; Ayako Iwasaki; Kurumi Ota; Ayako Nakayama; Mariko Yamamoto; Miho Kanno; Ema Kuribayashi; Shizuka Kubota; Fuyuki Kawai; Yuko Kuniki; Erika Ida
2014 Incheon	Pakistan (PAK); Bismah Maroof; Sana Mir; Javeria Khan; Nida Dar; Qanita Jalil; Nain Abidi; Asmavia Iqbal; Sidra Nawaz; Kainat Imtiaz; Marina Iqbal; Sumaiya Siddiqi; Sania Khan; Aliya Riaz; Anam Amin; Sadia Yousuf	Bangladesh (BAN); Rumana Ahmed; Salma Khatun; Panna Ghosh; Shohely Akhter; Shaila Sharmin; Fahima Khatun; Sanjida Islam; Lata Mondal; Nuzhat Tasnia; Shahanaz Parvin; Jahanara Alam; Khadija Tul Kubra; Ayasha Rahman; Sharmin Akhter; Fargana Hoque	Sri Lanka (SRI); Eshani Kaushalya; Dilani Manodara; Sripali Weerakkody; Anushka Sanjeewani; Shashikala Siriwardene; Inoka Ranaweera; Chamari Athapaththu; Yashoda Mendis; Chandima Gunaratne; Nilakshi de Silva; Lasanthi Madushani; Maduri Samuddika; Inoshi Priyadharshani; Udeshika Prabodhani; Chamari Polgampola
2022 Hangzhou	India (IND); Rajeshwari Gayakwad; Jemimah Rodrigues; Deepti Sharma; Harmanpreet Kaur; Richa Ghosh; Titas Sadhu; Shafali Verma; Smriti Mandhana; Amanjot Kaur; Pooja Vastrakar; Uma Chetry; Minnu Mani; Kanika Ahuja; Anusha Bareddy; Devika Vaidya	Sri Lanka (SRI); Kavisha Dilhari; Imesha Dulani; Anushka Sanjeewani; Inoka Ranaweera; Achini Kulasuriya; Nilakshi de Silva; Kaushini Nuthyangana; Inoshi Priyadharshani; Udeshika Prabodhani; Chamari Athapaththu; Vishmi Gunaratne; Hasini Perera; Oshadi Ranasinghe; Harshitha Samarawickrama; Sugandika Kumari	Bangladesh (BAN); Nigar Sultana; Rabeya Khan; Sobhana Mostary; Fahima Khatun; Shorna Akter; Lata Mondal; Disha Biswas; Sultana Khatun; Nahida Akter; Shathi Rani; Sanjida Akter Meghla; Shamima Sultana; Ritu Moni; Marufa Akter; Fargana Hoque
2026 Aichi–Nagoya	India; Shree Charani; Deepti Sharma; Renuka Singh Thakur; Richa Ghosh; Kamalini Gunalan; Shafali Verma; Smriti Mandhana; Arundhati Reddy; Radha Yadav; Harmanpreet Kaur; Kranti Gaud; Shreyanka Patil; Bharti Fulmali; Nandani Sharma; Pratika Rawal	Sri Lanka; Kavisha Dilhari; Hansima Karunaratne; Imesha Dulani; Kawya Kavindi; Rashmika Sewwandi; Anushka Sanjeewani; Sanjana Kavindi; Mithali Ayodhya; Kaushini Nuthyangana; Chamari Athapaththu; Hasini Perera; Chamudi Praboda; Nimasha Madushani; Harshitha Samarawickrama; Sugandika Kumari	Pakistan; Humna Bilal; Nashra Sundhu; Tasmia Rubab; Umm-e-Hani; Fatima Sana; Momina Riasat; Shawaal Zulfiqar; Aliya Riaz; Eyman Fatima; Eman Naseer; Gull Feroza; Saira Jabeen; Tuba Hassan; Ayesha Zafar
