= Japan at the 2010 Asian Games (C–G) =

- IOC code: JPN
- NOC: Japanese Olympic Committee

in Guangzhou
- Competitors: 729 in 42 sports
- Medals Ranked 3rd: Gold 48 Silver 74 Bronze 94 Total 216

Asian Games appearances (overview)
- 1951; 1954; 1958; 1962; 1966; 1970; 1974; 1978; 1982; 1986; 1990; 1994; 1998; 2002; 2006; 2010; 2014; 2018; 2022; 2026

Japan participated in the 2010 Asian Games in Guangzhou, China on 12–27 November 2010.

== Canoeing ==
=== Canoe-Kayak Flatwater ===
Men

Athlete	Event	Heats		Semifinals		Final	
Athlete	Event	Time	Rank	Time	Rank	Time	Rank
Naoya Sakamoto	C-1 200 m	42.582	2nd QF	auto advancement		41.261	3rd place, bronze medalist(s)
Takayuki Kokaji	C-1 1000 m	4:16.554	4th QS	4:16.011	2nd QF	4:08.201	5th
Taito Ambo; Naoya Sakamoto	C-2 1000 m					3:44.181	4th
Momotaro Matsushita	K-1 200 m	36.921	1st QF	auto advancement		36.279	1st place, gold medalist(s)
Yasuhiro Suzuki	K-1 1000 m	3:38.457	1st QF	auto advancement		3:38.498	3rd place, bronze medalist(s)
Momotaro Matsushita; Yasuhiro Suzuki	K-2 200 m	33.999	1st QF	auto advancement		33.058	1st place, gold medalist(s)
Keiji Mizumoto; Hiroki Watanabe	K-2 1000 m	3:18.178	1st QF	auto advancement		3:16.523	3rd place, bronze medalist(s)

Women

Athlete	Event	Heats		Semifinals		Final	
Athlete	Event	Time	Rank	Time	Rank	Time	Rank
Shinobu Kitamoto	K-1 200 m	41.757	1st QF	auto advancement		41.194	1st place, gold medalist(s)
Shinobu Kitamoto	K-1 500 m	1:52.886	1st QF	auto advancement		1:53.693	3rd place, bronze medalist(s)
Shinobu Kitamoto; Asumi Ohmura	K-2 500 m	1:44.642	1st QF	auto advancement		1:44.308	2nd place, silver medalist(s)
Shiho Kakizaki; Ayaka Kuno; Asumi Ohmura; Yumiko Susuki	K-2 500 m					1:39.187	3rd place, bronze medalist(s)

=== Canoe-Kayak Slalom ===
Men

Athlete	Event	Preliminary				Semifinal		Final	
Athlete	Event	Run 1	Run 2	Total	Rank	Time	Rank	Time	Rank
Takuya Haneda	C-1	91.83	97.92	189.75	2nd	97.00	2nd	95.06	2nd place, silver medalist(s)
Hiroyuki Nagao; Masatoshi Sanma	C-2	106.34	112.98	219.32	3rd	114.58	2nd	132.64	5th
Kazuki Yazawa	K-1	92.05	89.35	181.40	2nd	92.63	2nd	89.83	2nd place, silver medalist(s)

Women

Athlete	Event	Preliminary				Semifinal		Final	
Athlete	Event	Run 1	Run 2	Total	Rank	Time	Rank	Time	Rank
Asahi Yamada	K-1	99.64	97.64	197.28	1st	110.34	3rd	113.99	3rd place, bronze medalist(s)

== Cricket ==
=== Women ===
Team

- Ema Kuribayashi (captain)
- Shizuka Kubota
- Yuko Kuniki
- Ayako Iwasaki
- Erina Kaneko
- Miho Kanno
- Fuyuki Kawai
- Ayako Nakayama
- Kurumi Ota
- Yuko Saito
- Atsuko Suda
- Mariko Yamamoto
- Yuka Yoshida
- Shizuka Miyaji
- Erika Ida

Group round

Pool B

November 13
13:30
scorecard

Nepal; 62/7 (20 overs)	v	Japan; 64/0 (11.4 overs)
Roshani Bohara 16 (24); Shizuka Miyaji 2/10 (3 overs)		Ema Kuribayashi 32* (42); Ritu Kumari Kanoujiya 0/7 (2 overs)

Japan won by 10 wickets
Guanggong Cricket Stadium, Guangzhou
Umpires: Mosur Ramesh (SIN) and Narayanan Sivan (MAS)

- Japan won the toss and elected to field.

November 15
13:30
scorecard

Japan; 57/8 (20 overs)	v	Bangladesh; 111/8 (20 overs)
Ema Kuribayashi 18 (30); Suktara Rahman 3/6 (4 overs)		Suktara Rahman 37 (45); Kurumi Ota 3/16 (4 overs)

Bangladesh won by 54 runs
Guanggong Cricket Stadium, Guangzhou
Umpires: Sarika Prasad (SIN) and Viswanathan Kalidas (MAS)

- Bangladesh won the toss and elected to bat.

November 17
13:30
scorecard

Japan; 135/4 (20 overs)	v	Nepal; 90/9 (20 overs)
Ema Kuribayashi 63 (60); Sarita Magar 25/2 (4 overs)		Neera Rajopadhyay 37 (47); Kurumi Ota 2/16 (4 overs)

Japan won by 45 runs
Guanggong Cricket Stadium, Guangzhou
Umpires: Viswanathan Kalidas (MAS) and Li Zhen (CHN)

- Japan won the toss and elected to bat.

Semifinals

November 18
13:30
scorecard

Japan; 61/8 (20 overs)	v	Pakistan; 62/1 (10.4 overs)
Ema Kuribayashi 24 (37); Sana Gulzar 2/8 (4 overs)		Javeria Wadood 29 (25); Fuyuki Kawai 1/8 (1 over)

Pakistan won by 9 wickets
Guanggong Cricket Stadium, Guangzhou
Umpires: Buddhi Pradhan (NEP) and Viswanathan Kalidas (MAS)

- Japan won the toss and elected to bat.

Bronze medal match

November 19
9:30
scorecard

China; 65/6 (20 overs)	v	Japan; 66/3 (19.1 overs)
Zhang Mei 26 (42); Ota Kurumi 2/8 (4 overs)		Ema Kuribayashi 24* (55); Mei Chunhua 1/3 (4 overs)

Japan won by 7 wickets
Guanggong Cricket Stadium, Guangzhou
Umpires: Viswanathan Kalidas (MAS), Narayanan Sivan (MAS)

- Japan won the toss and elected to field.

== Cue Sports ==
Athlete	Event	Round of 64	Round of 32	Round of 16	Quarterfinals	Semifinals	Final
Athlete	Event	Opposition Result	Opposition Result	Opposition Result	Opposition Result	Opposition Result	Opposition Result
Tsuyoshi Suzuki	Men's Carom 3 Cushion Singles			Batbayaryn Dorjsuren (MGL); W 40-11	Thawat Sujaritthurakarn (THA); W 40-10	Ly The Vinh (VIE); W 40-36	Joji Kai (JPN); W 40-37 (gold)
Joji Kai	Men's Carom 3 Cushion Singles			Kim Kyung-Roul (KOR); W 40-39	Dharminder Lilly (IND); W 40-8	Duong Anh Vu (VIE); W 40-29	Tsuyoshi Suzuki (JPN); L 37-40 (silver)
Hisataka Kamihashi	Men's Eight-ball Singles	BYE	Li Hewen (CHN); W 7-4	Ibrahim Amir (MAS); L 6-7	Did not advance		
Masaaki Tanaka	Men's Eight-ball Singles	BYE	Liu Haitao (CHN); L 3-7	Did not advance			
Hisataka Kamihashi	Men's Nine-ball singles	Alok Kumar (IND); W 9-4	Lee Poh Soon (MAS); W 9-7	Dennis Orcollo (PHI); L 4-9	Did not advance		
Masaaki Tanaka	Men's Nine-ball singles	BYE	Al-Muhtadee Billah (BRU); W WO	Ricky Yang (SIN); L 7-9	Did not advance		
Akimi Kajitani	Women's Eight-ball Singles		Neeta Sanghvi (IND); W 5-3	Fu Xiaofang (CHN); W 5-3	Chou Chieh-yu (TPE); L 4-5	Did not advance	
Junko Mitsuoka	Women's Eight-ball Singles		Duong Thuy Vi (VIE); L 3-5	Did not advance			
Junko Mitsuoka	Women's Nine-ball singles		Neena Praveen (IND); W 7-3	Nicha Pathom-Ekmongkhon (THA); W 7-4	Lin Yuan-chun (TPE); L 5-7	Did not advance	
Akimi Kajitani	Women's Nine-ball singles		Charlene Chai (SIN); W 7-4	Fu Xiaofang (CHN); L 3-7	Did not advance		

== Cycling ==
=== BMX ===
Men

Athlete	Event	Qualifying				Final	
Athlete	Event	Run 1	Run 2	Run 3	Points	Time	Rank
Akifumi Sakamoto	Individual	32.052	31.699	32.427	3 Q	31.466	2nd place, silver medalist(s)
Masahiro Sampei	Individual	32.052	31.699	32.427	6 Q	31.466	3rd place, bronze medalist(s)

Women

Athlete	Event	Qualifying				Final	
Athlete	Event	Run 1	Run 2	Run 3	Points	Time	Rank
Ayaka Miwa	Individual	39.377	38.985	38.146	6 Q	37.802	2nd place, silver medalist(s)
Miki Iibata	Individual	41.735	2:23.660	38.772	12	Did not advance	

=== Mountain Bike ===
Men

Athlete	Event	Time	Rank
Kohei Yamamoto	Cross-country	2:11:49	2nd place, silver medalist(s)
Seiya Hirano	Cross-country	2:19:49	4th

Women

Athlete	Event	Time	Rank
Rie Katayama	Cross-country	2:01:15	3rd place, bronze medalist(s)
Yukari Nakagome	Cross-country	2:06:10	5th

=== Road ===
Men

Athlete	Event	Time	Rank
Takashi Miyazawa	Road race	4:14:54	2nd place, silver medalist(s)
Shinri Suzuki	Road race	4:14:54	14th
Kazuhiro Mori	Time trial	1:11:44.60	7th

Women

Athlete	Event	Time	Rank
Mayuko Hagiwara	Road race	2:47:46	14th
Kanako Nishi	Road race	2:47:46	16th
Mayuko Hagiwara	Time trial	53:11.69	5th

=== Track ===
Sprints

Athlete	Event	Qualifying		1/16 Finals (Repechage)	1/8 Finals (Repechage)	Quarterfinals	Semifinals	Finals/ Classification races	
Athlete	Event	Time Speed	Rank	Opposition Time	Opposition Time	Opposition Time	Opposition Time	Opposition Time	Rank
Tsubasa Kitatsuru	Men's sprint	10.297	2nd Q	Khalid Al-Bardiny (QAT); W WO	Hsiao Shih-hsin (TPE); W 11.255	Farshid Farsinejadian (IRI); W 10.754, W 10.857	Azizulhasni Awang (MAS); W 10.550, L, W 10.734	Zhang Lei (CHN); L, L	2nd place, silver medalist(s)
Yudai Nitta	Men's sprint	10.363	4th Q	Raja Audi (LIB); W 12.266	Farshid Farsinejadian (IRI); W 11.182	Choi Lae-Seon (KOR); W 11.229, W 10.588	Zhang Lei (CHN); L, L	Bronze medal match: Azizulhasni Awang (MAS); W 11.231, W 11.023	3rd place, bronze medalist(s)
Kazuya Narita; Yudai Nitta; Kazunari Watanabe	Men's team sprint	44.855	2nd Q					China; L	2nd place, silver medalist(s)
Kayono Maeda	Women's sprint	11.954	11th Q		Lin Junhong (CHN); L Repechage race: Meng Zhao Juan (HKG); Jutatip Maneephan (THA); 3rd	Did not advance			
Sakiko Numabe	Women's sprint	12.744	14th		Did not advance				

Pursuits

Athlete	Event	Qualifying		1st round		Finals	
Athlete	Event	Time	Rank	Opposition Time	Rank	Opposition Time	Rank
Taiji Nishitani	Men's individual pursuit	4:39.277	10th	Did not advance			
Yu Motosuna	Men's individual pursuit	4:43.147	13th	Did not advance			
Mayuko Hagiwara	Women's individual pursuit	3:55.356	9th	Did not advance			
Minami Uwano	Women's individual pursuit	3:55.620	10th	Did not advance			
Kazuhiro Mori; Yu Motosuna; Taiji Nishitani; Ryu Sasaki	Men's team pursuit	4:21.407	6th Q	China; L DSQ	2nd	Did not advance	

Keirin

Athlete	Event	1st round	Repechage	2nd round	Finals
Athlete	Event	Rank	Rank	Rank	Rank
Kazunari Watanabe	Men's keirin	1st Q		1st QF	4th
Kota Asai	Men's keirin	3rd R	3rd	Did not advance	

Time Trial

Athlete	Event	Time	Rank
Kayono Maeda	Women's 500 m time trial	36.033	6th

Points races

Athlete	Event	Qualifying		Final	
Athlete	Event	Points	Rank	Points	Rank
Taiji Nishitani	Men's points race	45	3rd Q	46	8th
Kazuhiro Mori	Men's points race	5	6th	52	6th
Minami Uwano	Women's points race			10	5th
Mayuko Hagiwara	Women's points race			DNF	

== Dancesport ==
Standard dance

Athlete	Event	Quarterfinal		Semifinal		Final	
Athlete	Event	Points	Rank	Points	Rank	Points	Rank
Masayuki Ishihara; Ayami Kubo	Waltz	9.00	1st S	9.00	1st F	41.57	2nd place, silver medalist(s)
Masayuki Ishihara; Ayami Kubo	Quickstep	9.00	1st S	9.00	1st F	42.21	2nd place, silver medalist(s)
Minato Kojima; Megumi Morita	Tango	6.00	7th S	5.00	5th F	36.43	3rd place, bronze medalist(s)
Tsuyoshi Nukina; Mariko Shibahara	Slow Foxtrot	9.00	1st S	9.00	1st F	36.93	3rd place, bronze medalist(s)
Tsuyoshi Nukina; Mariko Shibahara	Five Dances			45.00	1st F	180.50	4th

Latin dance

Athlete	Event	Quarterfinal		Semifinal		Final	
Athlete	Event	Points	Rank	Points	Rank	Points	Rank
Tsuneki Masatani; Megumi Saito	Samba	9.00	1st S	8.00	2nd F	38.50	3rd place, bronze medalist(s)
Tsuneki Masatani; Megumi Saito	Paso doble	8.00	3rd S	8.00	3rd F	38.29	4th
Yuki Suzuki; Kana Suzuki	Cha-cha-cha	4.00	7th S	4.00	6th F	36.21	4th
Yumiya Kubota; Rara Kubota	Jive	9.00	1st S	9.00	1st F	38.57	3rd place, bronze medalist(s)
Yumiya Kubota; Rara Kubota	Five Dances	45.00	1st S	36.00	4th F	201.21	2nd place, silver medalist(s)

== Diving ==
Men

Athlete	Events	Preliminary		Final	
Athlete	Events	Points	Rank	Points	Rank
Yu Okamoto	Men's 1 m Individual Springboard			303.95	10th
Yu Okamoto	Men's 3 m Individual Springboard	403.70	7th Q	404.60	7th
Sho Sakai	Men's 3 m Individual Springboard	402.50	8th Q	410.25	6th
Yu Okamoto; Sho Sakai	Men's 3 m Synchronised Springboard			377.70	4TH
Sho Sakai	Men's 10 m Individual Platform	413.60	5th Q	445.25	5th
Kazuki Murakami	Men's 10 m Individual Platform	386.90	8th Q	414.65	7th
Kazuki Murakami; Yu Okamoto	Men's 10 m Synchronised Platform			388.20	5th

Women

Athlete	Events	Preliminary		Final	
Athlete	Events	Points	Rank	Points	Rank
Sayaka Shibusawa	Women's 1 m Individual Springboard			254.80	6th
Risa Asada	Women's 1 m Individual Springboard			247.60	7th
Sayaka Shibusawa	Women's 3 m Individual Springboard	280.50	4th Q	271.95	7th
Mai Nakagawa	Women's 3 m Individual Springboard	259.10	6th Q	284.25	4th
Mai Nakagawa; Sayaka Shibusawa	Women's 3 m Synchronised Springboard			277.50	3rd place, bronze medalist(s)
Fuka Tatsumi	Women's 10 m Individual Platform	330.70	5th Q	290.30	7th
Mai Nakagawa	Women's 10 m Individual Platform	299.10	6th Q	291.40	6th
Risa Asada; Fuka Tatsumi	Women's 10 m Synchronised Platform			281.43	4th

== Dragon boat ==
Men

Team	Event	Heat		Repechage		Final	
Team	Event	Time	Rank	Time	Rank	Time	Rank
Kazuhisa Aguro; Hiroki Azuma; Masaki Chihara; Ryosuke Doi; Kazuhiro Fujii; Tatsuya Fujimoto; Akira Fujiwara; Shota Higashi; Yuto Hirayama; Hideyuki Ikeda; Hiroyuki Innami; Takeshi Inque; Daisuke Kinoshita; Ryuji Kishimoto; Tetsuya Kishimoto; Hiromitsu Kono; Takamasa Matsuno; Kunihiko Nakano; Masayuki Shoji; Moriaki Sumita; Yuya Suzuki; Yuki Urakawa; Hiroshi Yamamoto; Satoshi Yamamoto	250 m	53.258	2nd R	53.723	2nd F	52.947	6th
Kazuhisa Aguro; Hiroki Azuma; Masaki Chihara; Ryosuke Doi; Kazuhiro Fujii; Tatsuya Fujimoto; Akira Fujiwara; Shota Higashi; Yuto Hirayama; Hideyuki Ikeda; Hiroyuki Innami; Takeshi Inque; Daisuke Kinoshita; Ryuji Kishimoto; Tetsuya Kishimoto; Hiromitsu Kono; Takamasa Matsuno; Kunihiko Nakano; Masayuki Shoji; Moriaki Sumita; Yuya Suzuki; Yuki Urakawa; Hiroshi Yamamoto; Satoshi Yamamoto	500 m	1:50.467	6th R	1:49.551	3rd	Did not advance	
Kazuhisa Aguro; Hiroki Azuma; Masaki Chihara; Ryosuke Doi; Kazuhiro Fujii; Tatsuya Fujimoto; Akira Fujiwara; Shota Higashi; Yuto Hirayama; Hideyuki Ikeda; Hiroyuki Innami; Takeshi Inque; Daisuke Kinoshita; Ryuji Kishimoto; Tetsuya Kishimoto; Hiromitsu Kono; Takamasa Matsuno; Kunihiko Nakano; Masayuki Shoji; Moriaki Sumita; Yuya Suzuki; Yuki Urakawa; Hiroshi Yamamoto; Satoshi Yamamoto	1000 m	3:47.302	3rd R	3:47.886	4th	Did not advance	

== Equestrian ==
=== Dressage ===
Athlete	Horse	Event	Qualifier		Round A		Round B		Total Round A+B	
Athlete	Horse	Event	Score	Rank	Score	Rank	Score	Rank	Score	Rank
Shingo Hayashi	Olga	Individual	66.500	4th	67.316	4th	68.400	5th	67.858	5th
Mayumi Ino	Niels	Individual	63.333	13th	61.789	12th	64.950	7th	63.370	8th
Asuka Sakurai	Wesley S	Individual	64.444	8th	58.421	17th	Did not advance			
Akihiro Shimoda	Loriot 347	Individual	62.833	14th	Did not advance					
Shingo Hayashi; Mayumi Ino; Asuka Sakurai; Akihiro Shimoda	Olga; Niels; Wesley S Loriot 347	Team	64.759	4th						

=== Eventing ===
Athlete	Horse	Event	Dressage		Cross-country			Jumping					
Athlete	Horse	Event	Dressage		Cross-country			1st Jumping			Final Jumping		
Athlete	Horse	Event	Penalties	Rank	Penalties	Total	Rank	Penalties	Total	Rank	Penalties	Total	Rank
Kenki Sato	Toy Boy	Individual	42.30	2nd	0.00	42.30	2nd	0.00	42.30	1st	0.00	42.30	1st place, gold medalist(s)
Yoshiaki Oiwa	Noonday de Conde	Individual	43.80	4th	0.00	43.80	4th	0.00	43.80	2nd	4.00	47.80	3rd place, bronze medalist(s)
Atsushi Negishi	Nid'Or Barbereau	Individual	47.30	6th	0.00	47.30	6th	0.00	47.30	5th	Did not advance		
Takayuki Yumira	Marquis de Plescop	Individual	54.20	15th	0.00	54.20	13th	0.00	54.20	11th	Did not advance		
Tatsuya Kusanagi	Jenny Black	Individual	50.80	9th	40.00	90.80	25th	4.00	94.80	25th	Did not advance		
Kenki Sato; Yoshiaki Oiwa; Atsushi Negishi; Takayuki Yumira	as above	Team	133.40	1st	0.00	133.40	1st	0.00	133.40	1st place, gold medalist(s)			

=== Jumping ===
Athlete	Horse	Event	Round 1		Round 2			Individual Final					
Athlete	Horse	Event	Round 1		Round 2			Round A		Round B		Total	
Athlete	Horse	Event	Penalties	Rank	Penalties	Total	Rank	Penalties	Rank	Penalties	Rank	Penalties	Rank
Satoshi Hirao	Udaryllis	Individual	9.00	25th	12.00	21.00	27th Q	0.00	1st Q	8.00	12th	8.00	5th
Daisuke Mizuyama	Off the Road	Individual	4.00	18th	0.00	4.00	8th Q	8.00	12th Q	4.00	5st	12.00	10th
Reiko Takeda	Ticannaf	Individual	18.00	29th	4.00	22.00	29th Q	31.00	24th	Did not advance			
Atsushi Katayama	Asterix	Individual	18.00	29th	13.00	31.00	31st	Did not advance					
Satoshi Hirao; Daisuke Mizuyama; Reiko Takeda; Atsushi Katayama	as above	Team	31.00	7th	16.00	47.00	7th						

== Fencing ==
=== Men ===
Athlete	Event	Round of Poules		Round of 32	Round of 16	Quarterfinals	Semifinals	Final
Athlete	Event	Result	Seed	Opposition Score	Opposition Score	Opposition Score	Opposition Score	Opposition Score
Keisuke Sakamoto	Individual épée	4 W - 1 L	8th Q	BYE	Sergey Katchurin (KGZ); W 14-13	Kim Won-Jin (KOR); L 6-15	Did not advance	
Shogo Nishida	Individual épée	2 W - 3 L	23rd Q	Alexandr Axenov (KAZ); W 15-9	Tsui Yiu Chung (HKG); W 6-4	Elmir Alimzhanov (KAZ); W 15-11	Li Guojie (CHN); L 13-15 (bronze)	Did not advance
Kazuyasu Minobe; Keisuke Sakamoto; Shogo Nishida	Team épée				United Arab Emirates; W 45-10	Uzbekistan; W 45-41	South Korea; L 37-45 (bronze)	Did not advance
Yuki Ota	Individual foil	5 W - 1 L	5th Q	BYE	Javad Rezaei (IRI); W 15-8	Zhu Jun (CHN); W 15-11	Choi Byung-Chul (KOR); L 12-15 (bronze)	Did not advance
Kenta Chida	Individual foil	4 W - 1 L	8th Q	BYE	Kevin Ngan (HKG); L 8-15	Did not advance		
Yuki Ota; Kenta Chida; Suguru Awaji; Yusuke Fukuda	Team foil				BYE	Thailand; W 45-27	South Korea; W 45-36	China; L 35-45 (silver)
Satoshi Ogawa	Individual sabre	4 W - 1 L	7th Q	BYE	Yu Peng Kean (MAS); W 15-8	Zhong Man (CHN); L 7-15	Did not advance	
Koji Yamamoto	Individual sabre	4 W - 1 L	6th Q	BYE	Mojtaba Abedini (IRI); L 13-15	Did not advance		
Shinya Kudo; Satoshi Ogawa; Koji Yamamoto	Team sabre					Kuwait; W 45-23	China; L 19-45 (bronze)	Did not advance

=== Women ===
Athlete	Event	Round of Poules		Round of 16	Quarterfinals	Semifinals	Final
Athlete	Event	Result	Seed	Opposition Score	Opposition Score	Opposition Score	Opposition Score
Megumi Ikeda	Individual épée	5 W - 1 L	4th Q	Sabrina Lui (HKG); L 6-15	Did not advance		
Nozomi Nakano	Individual épée	4 W - 1 L	6th Q	Oxana Svatkovskaya (KAZ); W 15-12	Cheng Ya-wen (TPE); W 15-9	Yeung Chui Ling (HKG); W 6-5	Luo Xiaojuan (CHN); L 10-13 (silver)
Megumi Ikeda; Nozomi Nakano; Ayaka Shimookawa	Team épée			BYE	Kyrgyzstan; W 45-29	Hong Kong; W 36-32	China; W 36-29 (gold)
Shiho Nishioka	Individual foil	4 W - 1 L	5th Q	Wanglembam Roji Devi (IND); W 15-7	Jeon Hee-Sook (KOR); L 6-15	Did not advance	
Kanae Ikehata	Individual foil	2 W - 2 L	9th Q	Lin Po Heung (HKG); W 15-5	Nam Hyun-Hee (KOR); L 8-11	Did not advance	
Kanae Ikehata; Shiho Nishioka; Chie Yoshizawa	Team foil				Vietnam; W 45-22	China; W 28-26	South Korea; L 27-45 (silver)
Seira Nakayama	Individual sabre	2 W - 3 L	11th q	Zhu Min (CHN); L 9-15	Did not advance		
Chizuru Oginezawa	Individual sabre	2 W - 3 L	10th Q	Tamara Pochekutova (KAZ); L 14-15	Did not advance		
Seira Nakayama; Chizuru Oginezawa; Maho Hamada	Team sabre				Hong Kong; L 33-45	Did not advance	

== Football ==
=== Men ===
Team

Takuya Masuda
Yuki Saneto
Jun Sonoda
Takefumi Toma
Yusuke Higa
Shoma Kamata
Ryohei Yamazaki
Kazuya Yamamura
Masato Kurogi
Kota Mizunuma
Kensuke Nagai
Shunya Suganuma
Daisuke Suzuki
Shohei Otsuka
Keigo Higashi
Hotaru Yamaguchi
Kyohei Noborizato
Shunsuke Ando
Masato Kudo
Takamitsu Tomiyama

Pool matches

Group A

Pos	Team	Pld	W	D	L	GF	GA	GD	Pts
1	South Korea	3	2	1	0	11	1	+10	7
2	China	3	2	1	0	11	1	+10	7
3	Vietnam	3	1	0	2	4	7	−3	3
4	Jordan	3	0	0	3	1	18	−17	0

Source: RSSSF
November 8
19:00

China	0 – 3	Japan
	Report	Yamazaki 11'; Nagai 58'; Suzuki 64'

Tianhe Stadium, Guangzhou
Referee: Valentin Kovalenko (Uzbekistan)

November 10
16:00

Malaysia	0 – 2	Japan
	Report	Nagai 26'; Yamaguchi 64'

Huadu Stadium, Guangzhou
Referee: Ebrahim Ali (Bahrain)

November 13
19:00

Kyrgyzstan	0 – 3	Japan
	Report	Noborizato 5', 61' (pen.); Tomiyama 79' (pen.)

Huadu Stadium, Guangzhou
Referee: Yu Ming-hsun (Chinese Taipei)

1/8 finals

November 16
15:30

Japan	5 – 0	India
Nagai 17', 51'; Yamazaki 28'; Yamamura 45'; Mizunuma 63'	Report

Huangpu Sports Center, Guangzhou
Referee: Banjar Al-Dosari (Qatar)

Quarter-finals

November 19
15:30

Thailand	0 – 1	Japan
	Report	Higashi 45'

Huangpu Sports Center, Guangzhou
Referee: Valentin Kovalenko (Uzbekistan)

Semi-finals

November 23
16:00

Iran	1 – 2	Japan
Afshin 6'	Report	Mizunuma 38'; Nagai 60'

Yuexiushan Stadium, Guangzhou
Referee: Tan Hai (China)

Final

November 25
19:00

United Arab Emirates	0 – 1	Japan
	Report	Saneto 74'

Tianhe Stadium, Guangzhou
Referee: Valentin Kovalenko (Uzbekistan)

=== Women ===
Team

Nozomi Yamago
Azusa Iwashimizu
Kyoko Yano
Yukari Kinga
Aya Sameshima
Mizuho Sakaguchi
Megumi Kamionobe
Aya Miyama
Ayako Kitamoto
Homare Sawa
Shinobu Ohno
Ayumi Kaihori
Saki Kumagai
Mami Yamaguchi
Kana Osafune
Nahomi Kawasumi
Manami Nakano
Megumi Takase

Pool matches

Group B

Pos	Team	Pld	W	D	L	GF	GA	GD	Pts
1	Japan	2	1	1	0	4	0	+4	4
2	North Korea	2	1	1	0	2	0	+2	4
3	Thailand	2	0	0	2	0	6	−6	0

Source: RSSSF
November 14
19:00

Thailand	0 – 4	Japan
	Report	Kitamoto 24'; Ohno 35'; Sakaguchi 60'; Wiwasukhu 86' (o.g.)

Huangpu Sports Center, Guangzhou
Referee: Hong Eun-Ah (South Korea)

November 18
16:00

Japan	0 – 0	North Korea
	Report

University City Stadium, Guangzhou
Referee: Wang Jia (China)

Semi-finals

November 20
16:00

Japan	1 – 0 (a.e.t.)	China
Ohno 108'	Report

Yuexiushan Stadium, Guangzhou
Referee: Hong Eun-Ah (South Korea)

Final

November 22
19:00

North Korea	0 – 1	Japan
	Report	Iwashimizu 73'

Tianhe Stadium, Guangzhou
Referee: Pannipar Kamnueng (Thailand)

== Golf ==
Men

Athlete	Event	Round 1	Round 2	Round 3	Round 4	Total	Par	Rank
Satoshi Kodaira	Individual	74	68	73	73	288	0	7th
Hideki Matsuyama	Individual	75	77	70	72	294	+6	14th
Kenta Konishi	Individual	75	72	75	74	298	+10	19th
Masahiro Kawamura	Individual	75	78	75	74	302	+14	29th
Satoshi Kodaira; Hideki Matsuyama; Kenta Konishi; Masahiro Kawamura	Team	224	217	218	219	878	+14	6th

Women

Athlete	Event	Round 1	Round 2	Round 3	Round 4	Total	Par	Rank
Mamiko Higa	Individual	71	74	72	74	291	+3	8th
Natsuka Hori	Individual	79	75	71	71	296	+7	10th
Mami Fukuda	Individual	78	75	74	79	306	+18	17th
Mamiko Higa; Natsuka Hori; Mami Fukuda	Team	149	149	143	145	586	+10	4th

== Gymnastics ==
=== Artistic gymnastics ===
Men
Individual Qualification & Team all-around Final

Athlete	Apparatus						Individual All-around		Team	
Athlete	Floor	Pommel horse	Rings	Vault	Parallel bars	Horizontal bar	Total	Rank	Total	Rank
Ryosuke Baba		11.250	14.500	15.800		14.750	56.300	55th		
Ryotaka Deguchi	14.400 Q	14.950 Q			14.550		43.900	66th		
Shun Kuwahara	14.400		14.650	15.500	15.450 Q	15.700 Q	75.700	30th		
Hisashi Mizutori	14.550 Q	14.000	15.350 Q	15.850	14.750	15.750 Q	90.250 Q	2nd		
Takuya Nakase	13.650	14.050	15.050 Q	15.300	14.450	14.700	87.200 Q	8th		
Kyoichi Watanabe	14.700	12.600	14.950	15.500	15.050 Q	15.200	88.000	5th		
Team Total	58.050	55.600	60.000	62.650	59.800	61.400			357.500	2nd place, silver medalist(s)

Individual

Athlete	Event	Final							
Athlete	Event	Floor	Pommel Horse	Rings	Vault	Parallel Bars	Horizontal Bar	Total	Rank
Hisashi Mizutori	Individual all-around	14.700	13.900	15.000	15.650	14.800	15.650	89.700	3rd place, bronze medalist(s)
Hisashi Mizutori	Floor	14.825						14.825	5th
Hisashi Mizutori	Rings			15.100				15.100	5th
Hisashi Mizutori	Horizontal Bar						14.775	14.775	5th
Takuya Nakase	Individual all-around	13.100	13.050	15.100	16.000	15.400	15.400	88.050	6th
Takuya Nakase	Rings			14.225				14.225	7th
Ryotaka Deguchi	Floor	13.425						13.425	8th
Ryotaka Deguchi	Pommel Horse		14.500					14.500	4th
Kyoichi Watanabe	Parallel Bars					15.000		15.000	5th
Shun Kuwahara	Parallel Bars					14.525		14.525	6th
Shun Kuwahara	Horizontal Bar						15.725	15.725	2nd place, silver medalist(s)

Women
Individual Qualification & Team all-around Final

Athlete	Apparatus				Individual All-around		Team	
Athlete	Vault	Uneven bars	Balance beam	Floor	Total	Rank	Total	Rank
Kyoko Oshima	13.950	14.150	13.500	13.000	64.600 Q	6th		
Momoko Ozawa	15.050 Q	11.350		11.650	38.050	27th		
Yuko Shintake		14.200	14.250 Q		28.450	33rd		
Rie Tanaka	14.750 Q	14.350 Q	14.000	13.350 Q	56.450 Q	4th		
Koko Tsurumi	13.850	14.450 Q	13.900	11.950	54.150	7th		
Mai Yamagishi	14.200		14.350 Q	13.350 Q	41.900	24th		
Team Total	57.950	57.150	56.500	51.650			223.250	2nd place, silver medalist(s)

Individual

Athlete	Event	Final					
Athlete	Event	Vault	Uneven bars	Balance beam	Floor	Total	Rank
Rie Tanaka	Individual all-around	14.550	13.700	13.100	13.500	54.850	3rd place, bronze medalist(s)
Rie Tanaka	Vault	14.237				14.237	2nd place, silver medalist(s)
Rie Tanaka	Uneven Bars		13.075			13.075	6th
Rie Tanaka	Floor				13.400	13.400	4th
Kyoko Oshima	Individual all-around	13.600	12.900	13.400	12.450	52.350	6th
Momoko Ozawa	Vault	14.112				14.112	3rd place, bronze medalist(s)
Koko Tsurumi	Uneven Bars		14.300			14.300	3rd place, bronze medalist(s)
Mai Yamagishi	Balance Beam			13.450		13.450	4th
Mai Yamagishi	Floor				13.625	13.625	2nd place, silver medalist(s)
Yuko Shintake	Balance Beam			13.075		13.075	5th

=== Rhythmic gymnastics ===
Individual Qualification & Team all-around Final

Athlete	Apparatus				Individual All-around		Team	
Athlete	Rope	Hoop	Ball	Ribbon	Total	Rank		
Riko Anakubo	24.000		25.250	25.200	74.850	13th		
Natsuki Konishi		24.750			24.750	29th		
Yuria Onuki	25.450	25.900	26.250	26.300	78.450 Q	5th		
Runa Yamaguchi	25.450	25.450	25.800	25.400	76.700 Q	7th		
Team Total	75.300	76.100	77.300	76.900			256.450	3rd place, bronze medalist(s)

Individual all-around

Athlete	Final					
Athlete	Rope	Hoop	Clubs	Ribbon	Total	Rank
Yuria Onuki	25.800	25.000	26.100	26.250	103.150	8th
Runa Yamaguchi	25.400	25.850	25.850	26.100	103.200	8th

=== Trampoline ===
Men

Athlete	Event	Qualification		Final	
Athlete	Event	Score	Rank	Score	Rank
Masaki Ito	Individual	74.90	3rd Q	41.90	4th
Tetsuya Sotomura	Individual	73.90	4th Q	42.40	3rd place, bronze medalist(s)

Women

Athlete	Event	Qualification		Final	
Athlete	Event	Score	Rank	Score	Rank
Ayana Yamada	Individual	66.40	4th Q	37.10	5th
