= Cricket at the 2010 Asian Games – Women's tournament =

International cricket tournament

Women at the 2010 Asian Games
- Venue: Guanggong International Cricket Stadium
- Date: 13–19 November 2010
- Competitors: 117 from 8 nations

Medalists
gold medal	Pakistan
silver medal	Bangladesh
bronze medal	Japan

The women's cricket tournament at the 2010 Asian Games was held in Guangzhou, Guangdong, China from 13 to 19 November 2010. The tournament was contested by 8 teams. The Pakistan women's team, which emerged as champions, did not lose a match in the tournament.

== Squads ==
Bangladesh	China	Hong Kong	Japan
Rumana Ahmed; Salma Khatun; Shohely Akhter; Ayesha Akhter; Chamely Khatun; Tithy Sarkar; Panna Ghosh; Sultana Yesmin; Lata Mondal; Tazia Akhter; Ayasha Rahman; Jahanara Alam; Champa Chakma; Shathira Jakir; Fargana Hoque	Huang Zhuo; Yang Yuxuan; Wang Meng; Sun Mengyao; Zhang Mei; Zhou Haijie; Yu Miao; Dai Shengnan; Zhang Jingjing; Sun Huan; Mei Chunhua; Zhong Duan; Wu Juan; Zou Miao	Mariko Hill; Betty Chan; Janet Cheung; Yasmin Daswani; Ishitaa Gidwani; Keenu Gill; Annie Ho; Manpreet Kaur; Godiva Li; Dominique McCusker; Alvina Tam; Connie Wong; Kristine Wong; Natural Yip	Erina Kaneko; Yuka Yoshida; Shizuka Miyaji; Atsuko Suda; Yuko Saito; Ayako Iwasaki; Kurumi Ota; Ayako Nakayama; Mariko Yamamoto; Miho Kanno; Ema Kuribayashi; Shizuka Kubota; Fuyuki Kawai; Yuko Kuniki; Erika Ida
Malaysia	Nepal	Pakistan	Thailand
Norlida Hamid; Norasyikin Razak; Zaibibiana Affandi; Nurroikha Choiri; Dewi Chunam; Jennifer Francis; Intan Jaafar; Nur Amirah Kamarudin; Mariana Lakie; Emylia Eliani; Rewina Mohammad; Nurul Azwin; Siti Mazila Hanafi; Alessandra Shunmugam; Nur Aishah	Neera Rajopadhyay; Ritu Kanujiya; Maya Rawat; Nary Thapa; Roshani Bohara; Rubina Chhetry; Rashmi Sharma; Binu Magar; Janaki Bhatta; Sarita Magar; Khina Thapa; Melina Rayamajhi; Sita Rana Magar; Mamata Thapa; Rekha Rawal	Sana Mir; Batool Fatima; Nida Dar; Nahida Khan; Bismah Maroof; Nain Abidi; Asmavia Iqbal; Kainat Imtiaz; Marina Iqbal; Mariam Hasan; Sania Khan; Masooma Junaid; Sana Gulzar; Javeria Khan	Sornnarin Tippoch; Nantanit Konchan; Narumon Srisuwan; Thanapan Saisud; Pundarika Prathanmitr; Sirinton Sanechop; Siwaporn Kosathong; Rattana Sangsoma; Ratanaporn Padunglerd; Kaewkarn Mongkonsamai; Thippakorn Gatekam; Natthakan Chantham; Pornteera Olarigachat; Nattaya Boochatham; Naruemol Chaiwai

== Results ==
All times are China Standard Time (UTC+08:00)

=== Group round ===
==== Pool A ====
Round 1
13 November
China	116/6
Malaysia	61/8
14 November
Pakistan	50/2
Thailand	49

Round 2
15 November
China	60/5
Pakistan	64/1
16 November
Malaysia	63
Thailand	94/8

Repechage
17 November
China	93/6
Thailand	92/6

13 November
9:30
Scorecard

China; 116/6 (20 overs)	v	Malaysia; 61/8 (20 overs)
Sun Huan 47 (49); Rewina Mohammad 3/21 (4 overs)		Siti Mazila Hanafi 15* (16); Mei Chunhua 3/8 (4 overs)

China won by 55 runs
Guanggong International Cricket Stadium, Guangzhou
Umpires: Buddhi Pradhan (NEP) and Sarika Prasad (SIN)

- China won the toss and elected to bat.

14 November
9:30
Scorecard

Thailand; 49 (19.3 overs)	v	Pakistan; 50/2 (8.3 overs)
Siwaporn Kosathong 10 (37); Sana Gulzar 4/8 (4 overs)		Nida Dar 21 (18); Thanapan Saisud 1/4 (1.3 overs)

Pakistan won by 8 wickets
Guanggong International Cricket Stadium, Guangzhou
Umpires: Buddhi Pradhan (NEP) and Viswanadan Kalidas (MAS)

- Thailand won the toss and elected to bat.

15 November
9:30
Scorecard

China; 60/5 (20 overs)	v	Pakistan; 64/1 (12.2 overs)
Zhang Mei 14 (32); Masooma Junaid 1/7 (4 overs)		Nida Dar 27 (29); Mei Chunhua 1/9 (3 overs)

Pakistan won by 9 wickets
Guanggong International Cricket Stadium, Guangzhou
Umpires: Buddhi Pradhan (NEP) and Narayanan Sivan (MAS)

- Pakistan won the toss and elected to field.

16 November
9:30
Scorecard

Thailand; 94/8 (20 overs)	v	Malaysia; 63 (16.2 overs)
Natthakan Chantham 19 (18); Alessandra Shunmugam 3/14 (4 overs)		Emylia Eliani 19 (30); Nattaya Boochatham 4/7 (3 overs)

Thailand won by 31 runs
Guanggong International Cricket Stadium, Guangzhou
Umpires: Mosur Ramesh (SIN) and Sun Jianxin (CHN)

- Thailand won the toss and elected to bat.

17 November
9:30
Scorecard

China; 93/6 (20 overs)	v	Thailand; 92/6 (20 overs)
Sun Huan 37 (47); Natthakan Chantham 2/11 (4 overs)		Pundarika Prathanmitr 46 (53); Yu Miao 2/10 (2 overs)

China won by 1 run
Guanggong International Cricket Stadium, Guangzhou
Umpires: Mosur Ramesh (SIN) and Narayanan Sivan (MAS)

- China won the toss and elected to bat.

==== Pool B ====
Round 1
13 November
Nepal	62/7
Japan	64/0
14 November
Bangladesh	26/0
Hong Kong	25

Round 2
15 November
Japan	57/8
Bangladesh	111/8
16 November
Nepal	73/3
Hong Kong	72/9

Repechage
17 November
Japan	135/4
Nepal	90/9

13 November
13:30
Scorecard

Nepal; 62/7 (20 overs)	v	Japan; 64/0 (11.4 overs)
Roshani Bohara 16 (24); Shizuka Miyaji 2/10 (3 overs)		Ema Kuribayashi 32* (42)

Japan won by 10 wickets
Guanggong International Cricket Stadium, Guangzhou
Umpires: Mosur Ramesh (SIN) and Narayanan Sivan (MAS)

- Japan won the toss and elected to field.

14 November
13:30
Scorecard

Hong Kong; 25 (17.1 overs)	v	Bangladesh; 26/0 (3.4 overs)
Keenu Gill 11 (39); Chamely Khatun 2/4 (3 overs)		Fargana Hoque 17* (17)

Bangladesh won by 10 wickets
Guanggong International Cricket Stadium, Guangzhou
Umpires: Sarika Prasad (SIN) and Mosur Ramesh (SIN)

- Hong Kong won the toss and elected to bat.

15 November
13:30
Scorecard

Bangladesh; 111/8 (20 overs)	v	Japan; 57/8 (20 overs)
Ayasha Rahman 37 (45); Kurumi Ota 3/16 (4 overs)		Ema Kuribayashi 18 (30); Ayasha Rahman 3/6 (4 overs)

Bangladesh won by 54 runs
Guanggong International Cricket Stadium, Guangzhou
Umpires: Sarika Prasad (SIN) and Viswanadan Kalidas (MAS)

- Bangladesh won the toss and elected to bat.

16 November
13:30
Scorecard

Hong Kong; 72/9 (20 overs)	v	Nepal; 73/3 (15.2 overs)
Connie Wong 47 (55); Nary Thapa 1/6 (4 overs)		Nary Thapa 28 (25); Connie Wong 1/7 (3.2 overs)

Nepal won by 7 wickets
Guanggong International Cricket Stadium, Guangzhou
Umpires: Viswanadan Kalidas (MAS) and Liu Jingmin (CHN)

- Hong Kong won the toss and elected to bat.

17 November
13:30
Scorecard

Japan; 135/4 (20 overs)	v	Nepal; 90/9 (20 overs)
Ema Kuribayashi 63 (60); Sarita Magar 25/2 (4 overs)		Neera Rajopadhyay 37 (47); Kurumi Ota 2/16 (4 overs)

Japan won by 45 runs
Guanggong International Cricket Stadium, Guangzhou
Umpires: Viswanadan Kalidas (MAS) and Li Zhen (CHN)

- Japan won the toss and elected to bat.

=== Knockout round ===
Semifinals
18 November
Bangladesh	35/1
China	34
18 November
Pakistan	62/1
Japan	61/8

Final
19 November
Bangladesh	92
Pakistan	93/0
Bronze medal match
19 November
China	65/6
Japan	66/3

==== Semifinals ====
18 November
9:30
Scorecard

China; 34 (15.5 overs)	v	Bangladesh; 35/1 (6.5 overs)
Sun Mengyao 10 (33); Salma Khatun 3/4 (3 overs)		Fargana Hoque 20* (19); Zhou Haijie 1/16 (2.5 overs)

Bangladesh won by 9 wickets
Guanggong International Cricket Stadium, Guangzhou
Umpires: Sarika Prasad (SIN) and Mosur Ramesh (SIN)

- Bangladesh won the toss and elected to field.

18 November
13:30
Scorecard

Japan; 61/8 (20 overs)	v	Pakistan; 62/1 (10.4 overs)
Ema Kuribayashi 24 (37); Sana Gulzar 2/8 (4 overs)		Javeria Khan 29 (25); Fuyuki Kawai 1/8 (1 over)

Pakistan won by 9 wickets
Guanggong International Cricket Stadium, Guangzhou
Umpires: Buddhi Pradhan (NEP) and Viswanadan Kalidas (MAS)

- Japan won the toss and elected to bat.

==== Bronze medal match ====
19 November
9:30
Scorecard

China; 65/6 (20 overs)	v	Japan; 66/3 (19.1 overs)
Zhang Mei 26 (42); Kurumi Ota 2/8 (4 overs)		Ema Kuribayashi 24* (55); Mei Chunhua 1/3 (4 overs)

Japan won by 7 wickets
Guanggong International Cricket Stadium, Guangzhou
Umpires: Viswanadan Kalidas (MAS) and Narayanan Sivan (MAS)

- Japan won the toss and elected to field.

==== Final ====
19 November
13:30
Scorecard

Bangladesh; 92 (20 overs)	v	Pakistan; 93/0 (15.4 overs)
Salma Khatun 24 (31); Nida Dar 4/16 (4 overs)		Nida Dar 51* (43)

Pakistan won by 10 wickets
Guanggong International Cricket Stadium, Guangzhou
Umpires: Sarika Prasad (SIN) and Buddhi Pradhan (NEP)

- Pakistan won the toss and elected to field.

== Final standing ==
Rank	Team	Pld	W	L	T	NR
1st place, gold medalist(s)	Pakistan	4	4	0	0	0
2nd place, silver medalist(s)	Bangladesh	4	3	1	0	0
3rd place, bronze medalist(s)	Japan	5	3	2	0	0
4	China	5	2	3	0	0
5	Nepal	3	1	2	0	0
5	Thailand	3	1	2	0	0
7	Hong Kong	2	0	2	0	0
7	Malaysia	2	0	2	0	0
