= Bangladesh at the 2010 Asian Games =

- IOC code: BAN
- NOC: Bangladesh Olympic Association

in Guangzhou
- Competitors: 150 in 16 sports
- Medals: Gold 1 Silver 1 Bronze 1 Total 3

Asian Games appearances (overview)
- 1978; 1982; 1986; 1990; 1994; 1998; 2002; 2006; 2010; 2014; 2018; 2022; 2026

Bangladesh participated at the 16th Asian Games in Guangzhou, China. It won 1 gold, 1 silver and 1 bronze medal.

== Medalists ==
Medal	Name	Sport	Event	Date
Gold	Men's Team	Cricket	Men's	26 November
Silver	Women's Team	Cricket	Women's	19 November
Bronze	Women's Team	Kabaddi	Women's	25 November

== Archery ==
=== Men ===
Athlete	Event	Qualification Round		Round of 64	Round of 32	Round of 16	Quarterfinals	Semifinals	Final
Athlete	Event	Score	Seed	Opposition Score	Opposition Score	Opposition Score	Opposition Score	Opposition Score	Opposition Score
Md. Emdadul Haque Milon	Men's Individual	1275	36th	BYE	Ryota Amano (JPN); L 0-4	Did not advance			
Shiek Sojeb	Men's Individual	1250	42nd	BYE	Yu Xing (CHN); L 0-4	Did not advance			
Ziaul Hoq Zia	Men's Individual	1227	49th	Did not advance					
Ziaul Hoq Zia; Shiek Sojeb; Md. Emdadul Haque Milon	Men's Team	3752	13th			India (IND); L 186-221	Did not advance		

=== Women ===
Athlete	Event	Qualification Round		Round of 32	Round of 16	Quarterfinals	Semifinals	Final
Athlete	Event	Score	Seed	Opposition Score	Opposition Score	Opposition Score	Opposition Score	Opposition Score
Najmin Khatun	Women's Individual	1003	52nd	Did not advance				
Mathui Prue Marma	Women's Individual	1207	42nd	Farida Tukebayeva (KAZ); L 1-7	Did not advance			
Beauty Ray	Women's Individual	1124	48th	Ya Ting Tan (TPE); L 2-6	Did not advance			
Najmin Khatun; Mathui Prue Marma; Beauty Ray	Women's Team	3334	13th		North Korea (PRK); L 195-205	Did not advance		

== Athletics ==
=== Men ===
Track and road events

Event	Athletes	Heats		Semifinal		Final	
Event	Athletes	Time	Rank	Time	Rank	Time	Rank
100 m	Azharul Islam	11.19	4th QS	11.14	7th	Did not advance	

=== Women ===
Track and road events

Event	Athletes	Heats		Semifinal		Final	
Event	Athletes	Time	Rank	Time	Rank	Time	Rank
100 m	Nazmun Nahar Beauty	12.72	5th	Did not advance			
200 m	Nazmun Nahar Beauty	29.35	6th			Did not advance	

== Board games ==
=== Chess ===
Athlete	Event	Win	Draw	Lost	Points	Finals				Rank
Athlete	Event	Win	Draw	Lost	Points	Win	Draw	Lost	Points	Rank
Ahmed Minhazuddin	Men's individual rapid	Fadi Malkawi (JOR); Kiyul Lee (KOR); Mohamed Hassan (MDV); Basheer Al-Qudaimi (YEM)	Antonio Rogelio Jr (PHI); Ni Hua (CHN)	Surya Shekhar Ganguly (IND); Susanto Megaranto (INA); Namkhai Battulga (MGL)	5.0					19th
Niaz Murshed	Men's individual rapid	Kiyul Lee (KOR); Wahab Ahmed Abdul (IRQ); Bilam Lal Shrestha (NEP); Samir Muhammad (SYR); Amanmurad Kakageldyev (TKM)	0	Nguyễn Ngọc Trường Sơn (VIE); Araz Basim Mohammed Al-Saffar (IRQ); Susanto Megaranto (INA); Handszar Odeev (TKM)	5.0					20th
Abu Sufian Shakil; Hasan Mehdi; Ahmed Minhazuddin; Niaz Murshed; Rahman Ziaur	Men's team classical	Lebanon (LIB); 4.0-0.0; South Korea (KOR); 4.0-0.0; Mongolia (MGL); 2.5-1.5	0	China (CHN); 1.5-2.5; Philippines (PHI); 1.0-3.0; Qatar (QAT); 1.5-2.5; Uzbekistan (UZB); 1.0-3.0	6	Did not advance				10th
Akter Liza Shamima	Women's individual rapid	Mohamed Moomina (MDV); Asmita Adhikari (NEP); Delbak Ismael Ibrahim (IRQ); Nabila Azman Hisham Nur (MAS)	Mekhri Geldiyeva (TKM)	Irine Kharisma Sukandar (INA); Batchimeg Tuvshintugs (MGL); Shadi Paridar (IRI); Bahar Hallaeva (MAS)	4.5					14th
Sharmin Sultana Shirin	Women's individual rapid	Asmita Adhikari (NEP); Alshaeby Boshra (JOR); Kholoud Esa Al-Zarouni (UAE); Al-Jeldah Fatemah Al-Jeldah (SYR)	0	Dronavalli Harika (IND); Batchimeg Tuvshintugs (MGL); Nabila Azman Hisham Nur (MAS); Guliskhan Nakhbayeva (KAZ); Nodira Nodirjanova (UZB)	4.0					21st
Masuda Begum; Rani Hamid; Nazrana Khan; Sharmin Sultana Shirin; Akter Liza Shamima	Women's team classical	Jordan (JOR); 4.0-0.0; Turkmenistan (TKM); 2.5-1.5; Syria (SYR); 4.0-0.0	0	Vietnam (VIE); 0.0-4.0; China (CHN); 1.5-2.5; India (IND); 0.5-3.5; Iran (IRI); 0.5-3.5	6	Did not advance				7th

== Boxing ==
=== Men ===
Athlete	Event	Round of 32	Round of 16	Quarterfinals	Semifinals	Final
Athlete	Event	Opposition Result	Opposition Result	Opposition Result	Opposition Result	Opposition Result
Jewel Ahmed Jony	Lightweight	BYE	Qing Hu (CHN); L PTS 0-9	Did not advance		
Md. Abdur Rahim	Light Welterweight	Serdar Hudayberdiyev (TKM); L PTS 0-6	Did not advance			
Suruz Bangali	Welterweight	Wilfredo Lopez (PHI); L PTS 1-5	Did not advance			

== Cricket ==
=== Men ===
Team

Mohammad Ashraful
Shamsur Rahman
Naeem Islam
Faisal Hossain
Shahadat Hossain
Mahbubul Alam
Nazmul Hossain
Mohammed Nazimuddin
Suhrawadi Shuvo
Dolar Mahmud
Mithun Ali
Nasir Hossain
Rony Talukdar
Shuvagoto Hom
Sabbir Rahman

- Three of the four ICC Full Members in Asia, Bangladesh, Pakistan and Sri Lanka as well as Afghanistan who played in the 2010 ICC World Twenty20 directly entered the quarterfinals.

Quarterfinals

November 23
9:30
Scorecard

Bangladesh; 150/7 (20 overs)	v	Malaysia; 80 all out (19.4 overs)
Mithun Ali 39 (35); Shahrulnizam Yusof 4/21 (4 overs)		Shafiq Sharif 21 (25); Mohammad Ashraful 3/5 (2 overs)

Bangladesh won by 70 runs
Guanggong Cricket Stadium, Guangzhou
Umpires: Buddhi Pradhan (NEP) and Mosur Ramesh (SIN)

- Bangladesh won the toss and elected to bat.

Semifinals

November 25
13:30
Scorecard

Bangladesh; 102/5 (15.2 overs)	v	Sri Lanka; 101 all out (20 overs)
Faisal Hossain 33 (24); Nuwan Zoysa 2/15 (2 overs)		Chinthaka Jayasinghe 28 (22); Suhrawadi Shuvo 4/6 (4 overs)

Bangladesh won by 5 wickets
Guanggong Cricket Stadium, Guangzhou
Umpires: Buddhi Pradhan (NEP) and Mosur Ramesh (SIN)

- Sri Lanka won the toss and elected to bat.

Final

November 26
13:30
scorecard

Afghanistan; 118/8 (20 overs)	v	Bangladesh; 119/5 (19.3 overs)
Asghar Stanikzai 38* (36); Mohammad Ashraful 2/3 (1 over)		Naeem Islam 34* (42); Karim Sadiq 2/27 (3 overs)

Bangladesh won by 5 wickets
Guanggong Cricket Stadium, Guangzhou
Umpires: Sarika Prasad (SIN) and Buddhi Pradhan (NEP)

- Afghanistan won the toss and elected to bat.

2010 Asian Games Gold Medal

Bangladesh

=== Women ===
Team

Rumana Ahmed
Salma Khatun
Shohaly Akhter
Ayesha Akhter
Chamely Khatun
Tithy Rani Sarkar
Panna Ghosh
Sultana Yesmin Boishakhi
Lata Mondol
Tazia Akhter
Suktara Rahman
Jahanara Alam
Champa Chakma
Sathira Jakir Jesy
Farzana Hoque Pinky

Pool B

November 14
13:30
scorecard

Bangladesh; 26/0 (3.4 overs)	v	Hong Kong; 25 all out (17.1 overs)
Farzana Hoque Pinky 17* (17); Connie Wong 0/5 (1 over)		Kanwardeep Keenu Gill 11 (39); Chamely Khatun 2/4 (3 overs)

Bangladesh won by 10 wickets
Guanggong Cricket Stadium, Guangzhou
Umpires: Sarika Prasad (SIN), Mosur Ramesh (SIN)

- Hong Kong won the toss and elected to bat.

November 15
13:30
scorecard

Japan; 57/8 (20 overs)	v	Bangladesh; 111/8 (20 overs)
Ema Kuribayashi 18 (30); Suktara Rahman 3/6 (4 overs)		Suktara Rahman 37 (45); Kurumi Ota 3/16 (4 overs)

Bangladesh won by 54 runs
Guanggong Cricket Stadium, Guangzhou
Umpires: Sarika Prasad (SIN) and Viswanathan Kalidas (MAS)

- Bangladesh won the toss and elected to bat.

Semifinals

November 18
9:30
scorecard

Bangladesh; 35/1 (6.5 overs)	v	China; 34 all out (15.5 overs)
Farzana Hoque Pinky 20* (19); Zhou Haijie 1/16 (2.5 overs)		Sun Mengyao 10 (33); Salma Khatun 3/4 (3 overs)

Bangladesh won by 9 wickets
Guanggong Cricket Stadium, Guangzhou
Umpires: Sarika Prasad (SIN) and Mosur Ramesh (SIN)

- Bangladesh won the toss and elected to field.

Final

November 19
13:30
scorecard

Bangladesh; 92 all out (20 overs)	v	Pakistan; 93/0 (15.4 overs)
Salma Khatun 24 (31); Nida Dar 4/16 (4 overs)		Nida Dar 51* (43); Jahanara Alam 0/3 (1 over)

Pakistan won by 10 wickets
Guanggong Cricket Stadium, Guangzhou
Umpires: Sarika Prasad (SIN) and Buddhi Pradhan (NEP)

- Pakistan won the toss and elected to field.

2010 Asian Games Silver Medal

Bangladesh

== Cue sports ==
=== Men ===
Event	Athlete	First round	Round of 32	Round of 16	Quarterfinals	Semifinals	Final
Event	Athlete	Opposition Result	Opposition Result	Opposition Result	Opposition Result	Opposition Result	Opposition Result
8-ball Pool Singles	Aga Navil Ibna Ekram	BYE	Irsal Afrinneza Nasution (INA); L 4-7	Did not advance			
8-ball Pool Singles	Tay Ef Quader	BYE	Amarjargal Tursaikhan (MGL); W 7-4	Khaled Almutairi (KUW); W 7-6	Po-Cheng Kuo (TPE); L 2-7	Did not advance	
9-ball Pool Singles	Tay Ef Quader	Jianbo Fu (CHN); L 1-9	Did not advance				
9-ball Pool Singles	Fahim Sinha	BYE	Ricky Yang (INA); L 5-9	Did not advance			

== Football ==
=== Men ===
Coach: (Croatia) Robert Rubčić

No.	Pos.	Player	Date of birth (age)	Club
1	GK	Aminul Hoque	5 October 1980 (aged 30)	(Bangladesh Football Federation) Muktijoddha Sangsad
2	DF	Nasirul Islam Nasir	5 October 1988 (aged 22)	(Bangladesh Football Federation) Mohammedan Dhaka
3	DF	Wali Faisal	1 March 1985 (aged 25)	(Bangladesh Football Federation) Mohammedan Dhaka
4	DF	Mohammed Ariful Islam	20 December 1987 (aged 22)	(Bangladesh Football Federation) Mohammedan Dhaka
5	DF	Rezaul Karim Reza	1 July 1987 (aged 23)	(Bangladesh Football Federation) Farashganj
6	MF	Atiqur Rahman Meshu	26 August 1988 (aged 22)	(Bangladesh Football Federation) Abahani Limited Dhaka
7	MF	Mohamed Zahid Hossain	15 June 1988 (aged 22)	(Bangladesh Football Federation) Mohammedan Dhaka
8	MF	Mamunul Islam	12 December 1988 (aged 21)	(Bangladesh Football Federation) Mohammedan Dhaka
9	FW	Enamul Haque	1 November 1985 (aged 25)	(Bangladesh Football Federation) Abahani Limited Dhaka
10	FW	Zahid Hasan Ameli	25 December 1987 (aged 22)	(Bangladesh Football Federation) Mohammedan Dhaka
11	MF	Shakil Ahmed	7 January 1988 (aged 22)	(Bangladesh Football Federation) Mohammedan Dhaka
12	GK	Mazharul Islam Himel	16 September 1988 (aged 22)	(Bangladesh Football Federation) Sheikh Russel
14	DF	Mamun Miah	11 September 1987 (aged 23)	(Bangladesh Football Federation) Mohammedan Dhaka
15	DF	Mohamed Mintu Sheikh	3 December 1989 (aged 20)	(Bangladesh Football Federation) Feni
16	MF	Zahid Parvez Chowdhury	29 December 1987 (aged 22)	(Bangladesh Football Federation) Abahani Limited Dhaka
17	MF	Shahedul Alam Shahed	12 February 1991 (aged 19)	(Bangladesh Football Federation) Abahani Limited Dhaka
18	MF	Abdul Baten Mojumdar Komol	2 August 1987 (aged 23)	(Bangladesh Football Federation) Mohammedan Dhaka
19	MF	Imtiaz Sultan Jitu	10 February 1990 (aged 20)	(Bangladesh Football Federation) Farashganj
20	FW	Mithun Chowdhury	10 February 1989 (aged 21)	(Bangladesh Football Federation) Abahani Limited Chittagong
21	FW	Tawhidul Alam Sabuz	14 September 1990 (aged 20)	(Bangladesh Football Federation) Farashganj

Men's team participated in group E of the football tournament.

Group E

Pos	Team	Pld	W	D	L	GF	GA	GD	Pts
1	United Arab Emirates	3	2	1	0	7	1	+6	7
2	Hong Kong	3	2	1	0	6	2	+4	7
3	Uzbekistan	3	1	0	2	3	4	−1	3
4	Bangladesh	3	0	0	3	1	10	−9	0

Source: RSSSF
November 7
16:00

Uzbekistan	3 – 0	Bangladesh
Turaev 23'; Ahmedov 43'; Nagaev 81'	Report

Yingdong Stadium, Guangzhou
Referee: Ebrahim Ali (Bahrain)

November 9
16:00

United Arab Emirates	3 – 0	Bangladesh
Khalil 46'; Fawzi 63', 82'	Report

Yingdong Stadium, Guangzhou
Referee: Vo Minh Tri (Vietnam)

November 11
16:00

Hong Kong	4 – 1	Bangladesh
Au Yeung Yiu Chung 2', 33'; Ju Yingzhi 41'; Chan Man Fai 87'	Report	E. Hoque 24'

Huadu Stadium, Guangzhou
Referee: Saeid Mozaffarizadeh (Iran)

2010 Asian Games 24th

Bangladesh

== Golf ==
=== Men ===
Event		1st Round		2nd Round		3rd Round		4th Round		Total		Rank
Event		Score	Par	Score	Par	Score	Par	Score	Par	Score	Par	Rank
Men's Individual	Md. Shakhawathossian Sohel	75	+3	73	+1	77	+5	74	+2	299	+11	=21st
Men's Individual	Md.Sayum	74	+2	74	+2	76	+4	78	+6	302	+14	=29th
Men's Individual	Md. Dulal Hossain	82	+10	79	+7	76	+4	73	+1	310	+22	=39th
Men's Individual	Md. Jakiruzzamann Jakir	75	+3	75	+3	82	+10	79	+7	311	+23	=42nd
Men's Team	Md. Shakhawathossian Sohel; Md.Sayum; Md. Dulal Hossain; Md. Jakiruzzamann Jakir	224	+8	222	+6	229	+13	225	+9	900	+36	10th

== Hockey ==
=== Men ===
Team

- Md. Maksud Alam
- Taposh Barmon
- Md.Mosiur Rahman Biplob
- Mdmamunur Rahman Chayan
- Md.Musharrof Hossain Kuti
- Md.Zahid Hossain
- Md.Rafiqul Islam
- Md Enamul Kabir
- A.H.M Kamruzzaman
- Pushkor Khisa
- Krishno Kumir
- Rashel Mahamud
- Sheikh Md. Nannu
- Md.Imran Hasan Pinto
- Md.Imran Ahamed Riaz
- Md. Hosney Mobarok Sumon

Men's team will participate in Group B of the hockey tournament.

Group B

Team	Pld	W	D	L	GF	GA	GD	Pts
India	4	4	0	0	22	4	+18	12
Pakistan	4	3	0	1	28	6	+22	9
Japan	4	2	0	2	13	13	0	6
Bangladesh	4	1	0	3	9	21	−12	3
Hong Kong	4	0	0	4	4	32	−28	0

November 15
17:30

Japan	3 – 1	Bangladesh
Yamabori 47'; Nagasawa 56'; Ozawa 69'	Report	Kumar 9'

Aoti Hockey Field 1, Guangzhou
Umpires:
Ilanggo Kanabathu (MAS)
Chen Dekang (CHN)

November 17
13:00

India	9 – 0	Bangladesh
Khandker 2', 39'; Sandeep 13', 47', 63', 66'; Shivendra 22'; Rajpal 37'; Dharamvir 69'	Report

Aoti Hockey Field 1, Guangzhou
Umpires:
Kim Hong-Lae (KOR)
Lim Hong Zhen (SIN)

November 18
15:30

Bangladesh	7 – 3	Hong Kong
Jimmy 16', 54'; Chayan 21', 35', 38', 46'; Alam 52'	Report	Asghar Ali 14'; Arif Ali 27', 69'

Aoti Hockey Field 1, Guangzhou
Umpires:
Simon Taylor (NZL)
Ilanggo Kanabathu (MAS)

November 21
14:30

Pakistan	6 – 1	Bangladesh
Abbasi 13', 27'; Abbas 15', 29'; Imran 37', 48'	Report	Barmon 63'

Aoti Hockey Field 2, Guangzhou
Umpires:
Chen Dekang (CHN)
Ilanggo Kanabathu (MAS)

Classification 5th–8th

November 23
9:00

China	4 – 1	Bangladesh
Dong Yang 8'; Na Yubo 25'; Liu Yixian 26', 50'	Report	Rana 41'

Aoti Hockey Field 1, Guangzhou
Umpires:
Haider Rasool (PAK)
Raghu Prasad (IND)

Classification 7th–8th

November 25
9:30

Bangladesh	5 – 6	Oman
Chayan 10', 43'; Khisa 20', 33'; Kumar 45'	Report	Al-Shibli 2'; Rajab 22'; Al-Shatri 54'; Al-Saadi 56'; Bait Jandal 58'; Al-Hasani 69'

Aoti Hockey Field 2, Guangzhou
Umpires:
Jang Jung-Min (KOR)
John Hrytsak (CAN)

2010 Asian Games 8th

Bangladesh

== Kabaddi ==
=== Men ===
Team

- Razu Ahmed
- Mozammel Haque
- Md. Maftun Haque
- Md Faruk Hasan
- Md. Mosharrof Hossain
- Mokterul Islam
- Md.safikulislam Matubber
- Md.aruduzzaman Munshi
- Abu Saleh Musa
- Md Bozlur Rashid
- Md Rokonnuzzaman
- Mohammad Tipu Sultan

Men's team will participate in Group B of the kabbibi tournament.

Preliminary round

Group B

Pos	Team	Pld	W	D	L	PF	PA	PD	Pts	Qualification
1	Pakistan	3	3	0	0	115	53	+62	6	Semifinals
2	Japan	3	2	0	1	74	58	+16	4	Semifinals
3	Bangladesh	3	1	0	2	76	89	−13	2	
4	Malaysia	3	0	0	3	82	147	−65	0	

Source: Results

November 22; 17:00	Bangladesh	13 – 15	Japan	Nansha Gymnasium, Guangzhou
November 22; 17:00		(5–6)		Nansha Gymnasium, Guangzhou

November 23; 10:00	Bangladesh	48 – 38	Malaysia	Nansha Gymnasium, Guangzhou
November 23; 10:00		(26–17)		Nansha Gymnasium, Guangzhou

November 24; 16:00	Pakistan	36 – 15	Bangladesh	Nansha Gymnasium, Guangzhou
November 24; 16:00		(26–10)		Nansha Gymnasium, Guangzhou

=== Women ===
Team

- Hena Akhter
- Rupali Akhter
- Kazi Shahin Ara
- Farzana Akhter Baby
- Juni Chakma
- Shahnaz Parvin Maleka
- Kochi Rani Mondal
- Ismat Ara Nishi
- Maleka Parvin
- Fatema Akhter Poly
- Sharmin Sultana Rima
- Dolly Shefali

Women's team will participate in Group B of the Kabaddi tournament.

Preliminary round

Group B

Pos	Team	Pld	W	D	L	PF	PA	PD	Pts	Qualification
1	India	3	3	0	0	81	41	+40	6	Semifinals
2	Bangladesh	3	2	0	1	48	53	−5	4	Semifinals
3	South Korea	3	1	0	2	40	75	−35	2	
4	Nepal	3	0	0	3	0	0	0	0	

Source: Results

November 22; 10:40	India	34 – 20	Bangladesh	Nansha Gymnasium, Guangzhou
November 22; 10:40		(22–7)		Nansha Gymnasium, Guangzhou

November 23; 17:30	South Korea	19 – 28	Bangladesh	Nansha Gymnasium, Guangzhou
November 23; 17:30		(10–16)		Nansha Gymnasium, Guangzhou

November 24; 10:40	Nepal	Walkover	Bangladesh	Nansha Gymnasium, Guangzhou
November 24; 10:40		(Nepal didn't show up)		Nansha Gymnasium, Guangzhou

Knockout round

Semifinals

November 25; 15:00	Thailand	34 – 23	Bangladesh	Nansha Gymnasium, Guangzhou
November 25; 15:00		(25–14)		Nansha Gymnasium, Guangzhou

FINAL RANK: (bronze)

== Karate ==
=== Men ===
Athlete	Event	Round of 32	Round of 16	Quarterfinals	Semifinals	Final
Athlete	Event	Opposition Result	Opposition Result	Opposition Result	Opposition Result	Opposition Result
Md.Samim Osman	Men's −55 kg		Eldor Djambaev (IRI); L PTS 1-4	Did not advance		
Md.Zahurul Islam	Men's −60 kg	BYE	Ulugbek Mukhsimov (UZB); L PTS 0-4	Did not advance		
Md.Zahurul Islam	Men's −75 kg	Mohammad Abdulmajid Taher (UAE); L PTS 0-10	Did not advance			
Md.Hasan Khan	Men's Individual Kata		Marwan Abdullah Almazem (UAE); L HAN 0-5	Did not advance		

=== Women ===
Athlete	Event	Round of 16	Quarterfinals	Semifinals	Final
Athlete	Event	Opposition Result	Opposition Result	Opposition Result	Opposition Result
Zawu Prue	Women's Individual Kata		Dewi Yulianti (INA); L HAN 0-5	Did not advance	

== Shooting ==
=== Men ===
Event	Athlete	Qualification		Final	
Event	Athlete	Score	Rank	Score	Rank
Men's 10 m air pistol	Md.iqbal Hossain	555- 7x	44th	Did not advance	
Men's 10 m air pistol	Md nadimul Islam Nadim	557- 9x	42nd	Did not advance	
Men's 10 m air rifle	Abdullahhel Baki	585-37x	23rd	Did not advance	
Men's 10 m air rifle	Md Asif Hossain Khan	585-39x	22nd	Did not advance	
Men's 10 m air rifle	Taufick Shahrear Kahn	581-29x	33rd	Did not advance	
Men's 10 m air rifle team	Abdullahhel Baki; Md Asif Hossain Khan; Taufick Shahrear Kahn			1751-105x	8th
Men's 50 m pistol	Md nadimul Islam Nadim	523- 6x	41st	Did not advance	
Men's 50 m rifle three positions	Abdullahhel Baki	1122-26x	32nd	Did not advance	
Men's 50 m rifle three positions	Ramjan Ali	1139-33x	19th	Did not advance	
Men's 50 m rifle three positions	Taufick Shahrear Kahn	1134-27x	25th	Did not advance	
Men's 50 m rifle three positions team	Abdullahhel Baki; Ramjan Ali; Taufick Shahrear Kahn			3395-86x	7th
Men's 50 m rifle prone	Abdullahhel Baki	580-24x	44th	Did not advance	
Men's 50 m rifle prone	Ramjan Ali	589-31x	18th	Did not advance	
Men's 50 m rifle prone	Taufick Shahrear Kahn	585-18x	31st	Did not advance	
Men's 50 m rifle prone team	Abdullahhel Baki; Ramjan Ali; Taufick Shahrear Kahn			1754-73x	9th

=== Women ===
Event	Athlete	Qualification		Final	
Event	Athlete	Score	Rank	Score	Rank
Women's 10 m air pistol	Armin Asha	369- 4x	36th	Did not advance	
Women's 10 m air pistol	Farhana Kawsar Rony	356- 3x	51st	Did not advance	
Women's 10 m air rifle	Sharmin Akhter	392-25x	22nd	Did not advance	
Women's 10 m air rifle	Tripti Datta	388-27x	39th	Did not advance	
Women's 10 m air rifle	Sharmin Aker Ratna	390-23x	35th	Did not advance	
Women's 10 m air rifle team	Sharmin Akhter; Tripti Datta; Sharmin Aker Ratna			1170-75x	10th
Women's 50 m rifle three positions	Sarmin Shilpa	535- 9x	45th	Did not advance	
Women's 50 m rifle three positions	Tripti Datta	550-11x	41st	Did not advance	
Women's 50 m rifle three positions	Sabrina Sultana	559-10x	32nd	Did not advance	
Women's 50 m rifle three positions team	Sarmin Shilpa; Tripti Datta; Sabrina Sultana			1644-30x	12th
Women's 50 m rifle prone	Sarmin Shilpa			566-15x	46th
Women's 50 m rifle prone	Tripti Datta			569-17x	44th
Women's 50 m rifle prone	Sabrina Sultana			581-26x	28th
Women's 50 m rifle prone team	Sarmin Shilpa; Tripti Datta; Sabrina Sultana			1716-58x	14th

== Swimming ==
=== Men ===
Athlete(s)	Event	Heats		Final	
Athlete(s)	Event	Result	Rank	Result	Rank
50 m Breaststroke	Md. Kamal Hossain	31.16	25th	Did not advance	
100 m Breaststroke	Md. Kamal Hossain	1:08.24	26th	Did not advance	
50 m Butterfly	Md. Kamal Hossain	26.90	27th	Did not advance	

=== Women ===
Athlete(s)	Event	Heats		Final	
Athlete(s)	Event	Result	Rank	Result	Rank
50 m Backstroke	Mahfuza Khatun	39.84	19th	Did not advance	
100 m Breaststroke	Mahfuza Khatun	1:22.85	17th	Did not advance	

== Taekwondo ==
=== Men ===
Athlete	Event	Round of 32	Round of 16	Quarterfinals	Semifinals	Final
Athlete	Event	Opposition Result	Opposition Result	Opposition Result	Opposition Result	Opposition Result
Md Arman Hossain	Featherweight (-68kg)	BYE	Saysana Vannavong (LAO); L PTS 2-10	Did not advance		
Md.mizanur Rahaman	Welterweight (-80kg)	Lin Zhao (CHN); L PTS 2-12				

=== Women ===
Athlete	Event	Round of 32	Round of 16	Quarterfinals	Semifinals	Final
Athlete	Event	Opposition Result	Opposition Result	Opposition Result	Opposition Result	Opposition Result
Mst. Sammi Akhter	Finweight (-46kg)	BYE	Yan Kumari Chaulagain (JOR); L PTS 1-12	Did not advance		
Kaltham Jasim Mohamed Jawher	Featherweight (-57kg)	BYE	Andrea Paoli (LIB); L PTS 1-5	Did not advance		

== Weightlifting ==
Athlete	Event	Snatch			Clean & Jerk			Total	Rank
Athlete	Event	Attempt 1	Attempt 2	Attempt 3	Attempt 1	Attempt 2	Attempt 3	Total	Rank
Md. Hamidul Ialam	Men's 69 kg	110	155	~~117~~	~~145~~	145	148	263	15th
Biddut Kumar Roy	Men's 105 kg	115	120	~~125~~	150	155	~~158~~	275	9th
Molla Shabira	Women's 48 kg	60	~~65~~	~~65~~	70	75	~~77~~	135	7th
Fahema Akther	Women's 58 kg	~~65~~	65	~~70~~	85	90	~~93~~	155	13th

== Wushu ==
=== Men ===
Changquan

Athlete	Event	Changquan		Total	
Athlete	Event	Result	Rank	Result	Rank
BAKKAR Mohammed Abu Bakkar	Changquan	DNS			

Nanquan\Nangun

Athlete	Event	Nanquan		Nangun		Total	
Athlete	Event	Result	Rank	Result	Rank	Result	Rank
Masbah Uddin	Nanquan\Nangun All-Round	6.95	16th	DNS		6.95	16th

=== Women ===
Sanshou

Athlete	Event	Round of 16	Quarterfinals	Semifinals	Final
Athlete	Event	Opposition Result	Opposition Result	Opposition Result	Opposition Result
Eti Islam	52 kg	BYE	Jung Hee Lee (KOR); L 0-3	Did not advance	
Mst Basona Khandokar	60 kg	Jharana Gurung (NEP); L 0-2	Did not advance		

== See also ==
- Bangladesh at the Asian Games
- Bangladesh at the Olympics
