= Cricket at the 2010 Asian Games – Men's tournament =

International cricket tournament

Men at the 2010 Asian Games
- Venue: Guanggong International Cricket Stadium
- Date: 21–26 November 2010
- Competitors: 129 from 9 nations

Medalists
gold medal	Bangladesh
silver medal	Afghanistan
bronze medal	Pakistan

Men's cricket at the 2010 Asian Games was held in Guangzhou, Guangdong, China from 21 to 26 November 2010. In this tournament, 9 teams played. Best 4 teams (three of the four ICC Full Members in Asia, Bangladesh, Pakistan and Sri Lanka as well as Afghanistan who played in the 2010 ICC World Twenty20) directly entered the quarterfinals.

== Squads ==
Afghanistan	Bangladesh	China	Hong Kong
Gulbadin Naib; Mohammad Shahzad; Sami Agha; Mohammad Nabi; Karim Sadiq; Shafiqullah; Mirwais Ashraf; Shabir Noori; Shapoor Zadran; Asghar Stanikzai; Samiullah Shinwari; Nawroz Mangal; Hamid Hassan; Aftab Alam	Mohammad Ashraful; Shamsur Rahman; Naeem Islam; Faisal Hossain; Shahadat Hossain; Mahbubul Alam; Mohammad Nazmul Hossain; Mohammed Nazimuddin; Suhrawadi Shuvo; Dolar Mahmud; Mohammad Mithun; Nasir Hossain; Rony Talukdar; Shuvagata Hom; Sabbir Rahman	Zhang Qirui; Zhang Peng; Zhang Yufei; Wang Dianyi; Wang Xin; Zhang Xinliang; Jiang Shuyao; Wang Lei; Wang Jing; Song Yangyang; Li Jian; Zhao Gaosheng; Sun Duo; Hou Sifeng	Irfan Ahmed; Nadeem Ahmed; Zafaran Ali; Najeeb Amar; Jamie Atkinson; Waqas Barkat; Ilyas Gull; Aizaz Khan; Asif Khan; Roy Lamsam; Nicholas Lau; Li Kai Ming; Niaz Ali; Farooq Saeed; Shakeel Haq
Malaysia	Maldives	Nepal	Pakistan
Faris Almas; Rakesh Madhavan; Shukri Rahim; Shafiq Sharif; Ahmad Faiz; Shahrulnizam Yusof; Derek Duraisingam; Nik Arifin; Manrick Singh; Eszrafiq Azis; Aminuddin Ramly; Ariffin Ramly; Suresh Navaratnam; Suhan Alagaratnam; Anwar Arudin	Moosa Kaleem; Jilwaz Rasheed; Abdulla Shahid; Mohamed Azzam; Neesham Nasir; Ismail Ali; Mohamed Akram; Ahmed Hassan; Mihusan Hamid; Hassan Ibrahim; Hassan Rasheed; Shafraz Jaleel; Mifthah Ahmed	Paras Khadka; Gyanendra Malla; Sharad Vesawkar; Binod Das; Rahul Vishwakarma; Basanta Regmi; Mahesh Chhetri; Anil Mandal; Amrit Bhattarai; Mehboob Alam; Naresh Budhayer; Binod Bhandari; Prithu Baskota	Khalid Latif; Azeem Ghumman; Naeemuddin; Mohammad Irshad; Lal Kumar; Sheharyar Ghani; Aizaz Cheema; Sarmad Bhatti; Naeem Anjum; Raza Hasan; Usman Qadir; Bilawal Bhatti; Akbar-ur-Rehman; Sharjeel Khan; Jalat Khan
Sri Lanka			
Jehan Mubarak; Jeevantha Kulatunga; Kaushalya Weeraratne; Chinthaka Jayasinghe; Indika de Saram; Nuwan Zoysa; Dilhara Lokuhettige; Kaushal Lokuarachchi; Dilshan Munaweera; Tillakaratne Sampath; Kusal Perera; Isuru Udana; Sajeewa Weerakoon; Gayan Wijekoon; Malinga Bandara			

== Results ==
All times are China Standard Time (UTC+08:00)

=== Group round ===
==== Pool C ====
Pos	Team	Pld	W	L	T	NR	Pts	NRR	Qualification
1	Malaysia	1	1	0	0	0	2	4.450	Quarterfinals
2	China	1	0	1	0	0	0	−4.450	Quarterfinals

Source: ACC

21 November
9:30
Scorecard

Malaysia; 162/8 (20 overs)	v	China; 73/8 (20 overs)
Rakesh Madhavan 68 (58); Li Jian 3/8 (1 over)		Song Yangyang 20 (28); Manrick Singh 2/10 (3 overs)

Malaysia won by 89 runs
Guanggong International Cricket Stadium, Guangzhou
Umpires: Sarika Prasad (SIN) and Buddhi Pradhan (NEP)

- China won the toss and elected to field.

==== Pool D ====
Pos	Team	Pld	W	L	T	NR	Pts	NRR	Qualification
1	Hong Kong	2	2	0	0	0	4	1.716	Quarterfinals
2	Nepal	2	1	1	0	0	2	1.125	Quarterfinals
3	Maldives	2	0	2	0	0	0	−2.901	

Source: ACC

21 November
13:30
Scorecard

Hong Kong; 115/7 (20 overs)	v	Nepal; 85/9 (20 overs)
Roy Lamsam 47 (61); Amrit Bhattarai 3/16 (4 overs)		Sharad Vesawkar 16 (27); Nadeem Ahmed 3/12 (4 overs)

Hong Kong won by 30 runs
Guanggong International Cricket Stadium, Guangzhou
Umpires: Sarika Prasad (SIN) and Viswanadan Kalidas (MAS)

- Hong Kong won the toss and elected to bat.

22 November
13:30
Scorecard

Nepal; 129/9 (20 overs)	v	Maldives; 54/8 (20 overs)
Binod Bhandari 32 (22); Hassan Ibrahim 2/16 (4 overs)		Shafraz Jaleel 13 (31); Rahul Vishwakarma 3/9 (4 overs)

Nepal won by 75 runs
Guanggong International Cricket Stadium, Guangzhou
Umpires: Sarika Prasad (SIN) and Li Zhen (CHN)

- Nepal won the toss and elected to bat.

23 November
13:30
Scorecard

Maldives; 84/9 (20 overs)	v	Hong Kong; 88/3 (14.1 overs)
Neesham Nasir 21 (37); Najeeb Amar 2/10 (4 overs)		Jamie Atkinson 44 (30); Moosa Kaleem 1/12 (2.1 overs)

Hong Kong won by 7 wickets
Guanggong International Cricket Stadium, Guangzhou
Umpires: Sarika Prasad (SIN) and Sun Jianxin (CHN)

- Maldives won the toss and elected to bat.

=== Knockout round ===
Quarterfinals
22 November
Pakistan	183/1
China	55/9
24 November
Afghanistan	66/2
Hong Kong	63
23 November
Bangladesh	150/7
Malaysia	80
24 November
Sri Lanka	73/8
Nepal	72

Semifinals
25 November
Pakistan	103/7
Afghanistan	125/8
25 November
Bangladesh	102/5
Sri Lanka	101

Final
26 November
Afghanistan	118/8
Bangladesh	119/5
Bronze medal match
26 November
Pakistan	141/4
Sri Lanka	135

==== Quarterfinals ====
22 November
9:30
Scorecard

Pakistan; 183/1 (20 overs)	v	China; 55/9 (20 overs)
Khalid Latif 103* (69); Zhang Yufei 1/31 (4 overs)		Li Jian 14 (23); Raza Hasan 3/10 (4 overs)

Pakistan won by 128 runs
Guanggong International Cricket Stadium, Guangzhou
Umpires: Buddhi Pradhan (NEP) and Narayanan Sivan (MAS)

- Pakistan won the toss and elected to bat.

23 November
9:30
Scorecard

Bangladesh; 150/7 (20 overs)	v	Malaysia; 80 (19.4 overs)
Mohammad Mithun 39 (35); Shahrulnizam Yusof 4/21 (4 overs)		Shafiq Sharif 21 (25); Mohammad Ashraful 3/5 (2 overs)

Bangladesh won by 70 runs
Guanggong International Cricket Stadium, Guangzhou
Umpires: Buddhi Pradhan (NEP) and Mosur Ramesh (SIN)

- Bangladesh won the toss and elected to bat.

24 November
9:30
Scorecard

Hong Kong; 63 (17.4 overs)	v	Afghanistan; 66/2 (13.2 overs)
Nadeem Ahmed 17 (29); Mirwais Ashraf 3/8 (4 overs)		Nawroz Mangal 20* (14); Nadeem Ahmed 1/13 (4 overs)

Afghanistan won by 8 wickets
Guanggong International Cricket Stadium, Guangzhou
Umpires: Buddhi Pradhan (NEP) and Viswanadan Kalidas (MAS)

- Hong Kong won the toss and elected to bat.

24 November
13:30
Scorecard

Nepal; 72 (19.4 overs)	v	Sri Lanka; 73/8 (18.5 overs)
Gyanendra Malla 30 (30); Jehan Mubarak 3/6 (3 overs)		Jeevantha Kulatunga 20 (20); Paras Khadka 2/7 (4 overs)

Sri Lanka won by 2 wickets
Guanggong International Cricket Stadium, Guangzhou
Umpires: Sarika Prasad (SIN) and Mosur Ramesh (SIN)

- Nepal won the toss and elected to bat.

==== Semifinals ====
25 November
9:30
Scorecard

Afghanistan; 125/8 (20 overs)	v	Pakistan; 103/7 (20 overs)
Shabir Noori 35 (30); Raza Hasan 2/19 (4 overs)		Khalid Latif 26 (32); Hamid Hassan 2/16 (4 overs)

Afghanistan won by 22 runs
Guanggong International Cricket Stadium, Guangzhou
Umpires: Sarika Prasad (SIN) and Narayanan Sivan (MAS)

- Pakistan won the toss and elected to field.

25 November
13:30
Scorecard

Sri Lanka; 101 (20 overs)	v	Bangladesh; 102/5 (15.2 overs)
Chinthaka Jayasinghe 28 (22); Suhrawadi Shuvo 4/6 (4 overs)		Faisal Hossain 33 (24); Nuwan Zoysa 2/15 (2 overs)

Bangladesh won by 5 wickets
Guanggong International Cricket Stadium, Guangzhou
Umpires: Buddhi Pradhan (NEP) and Mosur Ramesh (SIN)

- Sri Lanka won the toss and elected to bat.

==== Bronze medal match ====
26 November
9:30
Scorecard

Sri Lanka; 135 (19.5 overs)	v	Pakistan; 141/4 (18 overs)
Jeevantha Kulatunga 31 (29); Raza Hasan 2/19 (4 overs)		Khalid Latif 53* (42); Sajeewa Weerakoon 1/9 (2 overs)

Pakistan won by 6 wickets
Guanggong International Cricket Stadium, Guangzhou
Umpires: Buddhi Pradhan (NEP) and Sun Jianxin (CHN)

- Pakistan won the toss and elected to field.

==== Final ====
26 November
13:30
Scorecard

Afghanistan; 118/8 (20 overs)	v	Bangladesh; 119/5 (19.3 overs)
Asghar Stanikzai 38* (36); Mohammad Ashraful 2/3 (1 over)		Naeem Islam 34* (42); Karim Sadiq 2/27 (3 overs)

Bangladesh won by 5 wickets
Guanggong International Cricket Stadium, Guangzhou
Umpires: Sarika Prasad (SIN) and Buddhi Pradhan (NEP)

- Afghanistan won the toss and elected to bat.

== Final standing ==
Rank	Team	Pld	W	L	T	NR
1st place, gold medalist(s)	Bangladesh	3	3	0	0	0
2nd place, silver medalist(s)	Afghanistan	3	2	1	0	0
3rd place, bronze medalist(s)	Pakistan	3	2	1	0	0
4	Sri Lanka	3	1	2	0	0
5	China	2	0	2	0	0
5	Hong Kong	3	2	1	0	0
5	Malaysia	2	1	1	0	0
5	Nepal	3	1	2	0	0
9	Maldives	2	0	2	0	0
