= Cricket at the 2010 Asian Games =

- Venues: Guanggong International Cricket Stadium
- Dates: 13–26 November 2010
- Competitors: 246 from 11 nations

Cricket made its debut at the 16th Asian Games 2010 at Guanggong International Cricket Stadium, Guangzhou, China where it was one of 42 sports competed in. The matches were played in Twenty20 format.

Both men's and women's tournaments were conducted. In the men's event, host nation China were joined by three of the four ICC Full Members in Asia: Bangladesh, Pakistan and Sri Lanka as well as Afghanistan who played in the 2010 ICC World Twenty20.

Due to other international commitments, Sri Lanka, Bangladesh and Pakistan fielded understrength men's teams whilst India did not participate. Bangladesh defeated Afghanistan in the final event to win the gold medal while the latter won the silver. The bronze went to Pakistan after they beat Sri Lanka in the third-place match.

In the women's event, China played women's Full Member Pakistan. India and Sri Lanka did not participate. Pakistan won the gold medal in the women's event, while Bangladesh gained a silver. Japan defeated China in the bronze medal match.

== Schedule ==
P	Preliminary round	¼	Quarterfinals	½	Semifinals	F	Finals

Event↓/Date →	13th Sat	14th Sun	15th Mon	16th Tue	17th Wed	18th Thu	19th Fri	20th Sat	21st Sun	22nd Mon		23rd Tue		24th Wed	25th Thu	26th Fri
Men									P	P	¼	P	¼	¼	½	F
Women	P	P	P	P	P	½	F									

== Medalists ==
Event	Gold	Silver	Bronze
Men	Bangladesh; Mohammad Ashraful; Shamsur Rahman; Naeem Islam; Faisal Hossain; Shahadat Hossain; Mahbubul Alam; Mohammad Nazmul Hossain; Mohammed Nazimuddin; Suhrawadi Shuvo; Dolar Mahmud; Mohammad Mithun; Nasir Hossain; Rony Talukdar; Shuvagata Hom; Sabbir Rahman	Afghanistan; Gulbadin Naib; Mohammad Shahzad; Sami Agha; Mohammad Nabi; Karim Sadiq; Shafiqullah; Mirwais Ashraf; Shabir Noori; Shapoor Zadran; Asghar Stanikzai; Samiullah Shinwari; Nawroz Mangal; Hamid Hassan; Aftab Alam	Pakistan; Khalid Latif; Azeem Ghumman; Naeemuddin; Mohammad Irshad; Lal Kumar; Sheharyar Ghani; Aizaz Cheema; Sarmad Bhatti; Naeem Anjum; Raza Hasan; Usman Qadir; Bilawal Bhatti; Akbar-ur-Rehman; Sharjeel Khan; Jalat Khan
Women	Pakistan; Sana Mir; Batool Fatima; Nida Dar; Nahida Khan; Bismah Maroof; Nain Abidi; Asmavia Iqbal; Kainat Imtiaz; Marina Iqbal; Mariam Hasan; Sania Khan; Masooma Junaid; Sana Gulzar; Javeria Khan	Bangladesh; Rumana Ahmed; Salma Khatun; Shohely Akhter; Ayesha Akhter; Chamely Khatun; Tithy Sarkar; Panna Ghosh; Sultana Yesmin; Lata Mondal; Tazia Akhter; Ayasha Rahman; Jahanara Alam; Champa Chakma; Shathira Jakir; Fargana Hoque	Japan; Erina Kaneko; Yuka Yoshida; Shizuka Miyaji; Atsuko Suda; Yuko Saito; Ayako Iwasaki; Kurumi Ota; Ayako Nakayama; Mariko Yamamoto; Miho Kanno; Ema Kuribayashi; Shizuka Kubota; Fuyuki Kawai; Yuko Kuniki; Erika Ida

== Medal table ==
Rank	Nation	Gold	Silver	Bronze	Total
1	Bangladesh (BAN)	1	1	0	2
2	Pakistan (PAK)	1	0	1	2
3	Afghanistan (AFG)	0	1	0	1
4	Japan (JPN)	0	0	1	1
Totals (4 entries)		2	2	2	6

== Draw ==
=== Men ===
The three Test-playing countries and Afghanistan (who played in the 2010 ICC World Twenty20) were seeded and went directly to the knock-out stage.

Pool C

- Malaysia
- ~~Singapore~~*
- China

Pool D

- Nepal
- Hong Kong
- Maldives

Quarterfinals

- Sri Lanka vs. 2nd Pool D
- Pakistan vs. 2nd Pool C
- Bangladesh vs. 1st Pool C
- Afghanistan vs. 1st Pool D

* Withdrew

=== Women ===
Pool A

- Pakistan
- Thailand
- China
- Malaysia

Pool B

- Bangladesh
- Hong Kong
- Nepal
- Japan

== Final standing ==
=== Men ===
Rank	Team	Pld	W	L	T	NR
1st place, gold medalist(s)	Bangladesh	3	3	0	0	0
2nd place, silver medalist(s)	Afghanistan	3	2	1	0	0
3rd place, bronze medalist(s)	Pakistan	3	2	1	0	0
4	Sri Lanka	3	1	2	0	0
5	China	2	0	2	0	0
5	Hong Kong	3	2	1	0	0
5	Malaysia	2	1	1	0	0
5	Nepal	3	1	2	0	0
9	Maldives	2	0	2	0	0

=== Women ===
Rank	Team	Pld	W	L	T	NR
1st place, gold medalist(s)	Pakistan	4	4	0	0	0
2nd place, silver medalist(s)	Bangladesh	4	3	1	0	0
3rd place, bronze medalist(s)	Japan	5	3	2	0	0
4	China	5	2	3	0	0
5	Nepal	3	1	2	0	0
5	Thailand	3	1	2	0	0
7	Hong Kong	2	0	2	0	0
7	Malaysia	2	0	2	0	0
