= Venues of the 2010 Asian Games =

The 2010 Asian Games featured 53 competition venues and 17 training venues on the sixteen days Games competition from November 12 to November 27, 2010. Of them, eleven competition venues and one training venues are newly built, while the rest are renovated. All of the competition venues will be used after the opening ceremony bar football venues, which will be held from November 7, 2010. For opening and closing ceremonies, they will be held outside the stadium, along the Pearl River in Haixinsha Island.

== Competition venues ==
=== New ===
| Venue | Sport | Capacity | Ref |
|---|---|---|---|
| Haixinsha Asian Games Park (海心沙亚运公园) | Opening and closing ceremonies | 35,000 | |
| Guangzhou Chess Institute (广州棋院) | Weiqi, chess, xiangqi | n/a | |
| Haizhu Sports Centre (海珠体育中心) | Sepak takraw | 1,742 | |
| Aoti Aquatic Centre (奥体游泳馆) | Swimming, diving, modern pentathlon | 4,584 | |
| Aoti Tennis Centre (奥体网球中心) | Tennis | 10,000 | |
| Guangti Gymnasium (广体体育馆) | Basketball | 5,000 | |
| Huangpu Sports Centre Gymnasium (黄埔中心体育馆) | Basketball | 5,000 | |
| Asian Games Town Gymnasium (亚运城体育馆) | Gymnastics, cue sports, squash | 6,233 | |
| Guangzhou Velodrome (广州自行车轮滑极限运动中心) | Cycling | 8,500 | |
| Guangzhou Shotgun Centre (广州飞碟训练中心) | Shooting | 3,000 | |
| Nansha Gymnasium (南沙体育馆) | Wushu, kabaddi | 8,080 | |
| Guangzhou International Sports Arena (广州国际体育演艺中心) | Basketball | 18,000 | |

=== Existing ===
| Venue | Sport | Capacity | Ref |
|---|---|---|---|
| Yuexiushan Stadium (越秀山体育场) | Football | 30,000 | |
| Guangdong Gymnasium (广东体育馆) | Karate, taekwondo | 2,800 | |
| Guangdong Provincial People's Stadium (广东省人民体育场) | Football | 27,096 | |
| Aoti Main Stadium (奥体中心场) | Athletics | 80,012 | |
| Huangcun Sports Base (黄村体育基地) | Modern pentathlon | 2,000 | |
| Aoti Shooting Range (奥体射击馆) | Shooting | 1,500 | |
| Aoti Archery Range (奥体射箭场) | Archery | 2,600 | |
| Aoti Baseball Field (奥体棒球场) | Baseball | 4,200 | |
| Aoti Hockey Field (奥体曲棍球场) | Field hockey | 5,000 | |
| Tianhe Stadium (天河体育场) | Football (including men's and women's finals) | 56,000 | |
| Tianhe Gymnasium (天河体育馆) | Badminton | 9,000 | |
| Tianhe Natatorium (天河游泳馆) | Water polo | 3,000 | |
| Tianhe Tennis School (天河网球学校) | Soft tennis | 2,400 | |
| Tianhe Baseball Field (天河棒垒球场) | Softball | 3,000 | |
| Tianhe Bowling Hall (天河保龄球馆) | Bowling | 300 | |
| Guangzhou Gymnasium (广州体育馆) | Table tennis, volleyball | 10,018 | |
| Guangdong International Rowing Centre (广东国际划船中心) | Rowing, canoeing, kayaking | n/a | |
| Huangpu Sports Center (黄埔中心体育场) | Football | 10,000 | |
| Guangzhou Asian Games Beach Volleyball Venue (亚运城沙滩排球场) | Beach volleyball | 3,030 | |
| University Town Main Stadium (大学城中心区体育场) | Football, rugby sevens, triathlon | 50,000 | |
| University Town Triathlon Venue (大学城铁人三项赛场) | Triathlon, cycling, athletics | 2,648 | |
| Zhongda Gymnasium (中大体育馆) | Volleyball | 5,000 | |
| Huagong Stadium (华工体育场) | Football | 5,634 | |
| Huagong Gymnasium (华工体育馆) | Judo, wrestling | 1,500 | |
| Huashi Gymnasium (华师体育馆) | Handball | 3,000 | |
| Guanggong Gymnasium (广工体育馆) | Handball | 3,204 | |
| Guangwai Gymnasium (广外体育馆) | Volleyball | 4,415 | |
| Guangyao Gymnasium (广药体育馆) | Volleyball | 4,986 | |
| Guangda Gymnasium (广大体育馆) | Fencing | 3,712 | |
| Guanggong Cricket Stadium (广工板球场) | Cricket | 5,000 | |
| Dafushan Mountain Bike Course (大夫山自行车场) | Mountain biking | n/a | |
| Yingdong Stadium (英东体育场) | Football | 14,818 | |
| Yingdong Gymnasium (英东体育馆) | Basketball | 2,499 | |
| Huadu Stadium (花都体育场) | Football | 13,395 | |
| Dragon Lake Golf Club (九龙湖高尔夫球会) | Golf | n/a | |
| Zengcheng Gymnasium (增城体育馆) | Dancesport | 2,300 | |
| Zengcheng Dragon Boat Lake (增城龙舟场) | Dragon boat | 668 | |
| Guangzhou Equestrian Venue (广州马术场) | Equestrian | 4,000 | |

=== Outside Guangzhou ===
| City | Venue | Sport | Capacity | Ref |
|---|---|---|---|---|
| Foshan | Foshan Lingnan Mingzhu Gymnasium(岭南明珠体育馆) | Boxing | 8,324 | |
| Foshan | Foshan Shijilian Aquatics Centre (世纪莲游泳跳水馆) | Synchronized swimming | 2,800 | |
| Dongguan | Dongguan Arena (东莞体育馆) | Weightlifting | 4,000 | |
| Shanwei | Shangwei Water Sports Centre (广东海上运动场) | Sailing | n/a | |
