= Mariam Hasan =

Pakistani cricketer (born 1985)

Personal information
- Full name: Mariam Hasan
- Born: 19 September 1985 (age 41); Jhang, Punjab, Pakistan
- Batting: Right-handed
- Bowling: Right-arm medium-fast
- Role: All-rounder

International information
- National side: Pakistan (2010–2012)
- ODI debut (cap 59): 10 October 2010 v Sri Lanka
- Last ODI: 28 August 2011 v West Indies
- T20I debut (cap 21): 16 October 2010 v Ireland
- Last T20I: 31 October 2012 v India

Domestic team information
- Years: Team
- 201112–2012/13: Zarai Taraqiati Bank Limited
- 2014: Omar Associates

Career statistics
Competition	WODI	WT20I	WLA	WT20
Matches	3	5	12	23
Runs scored	14	9	97	345
Batting average	4.66	4.50	13.85	24.64
100s/50s	0/0	0/0	0/1	0/0
Top score	8	8*	59	42*
Balls bowled	–	42	108	345
Wickets	–	4	4	20
Bowling average	–	5.75	11.00	13.00
5 wickets in innings	–	0	0	0
10 wickets in match	–	0	0	0
Best bowling	–	2/8	4/21	4/17
Catches/stumpings	0/–	0/–	0/–	5/–
Medal record
Representing Pakistan
Women's Cricket
Asian Games
Gold medal – first place	2010 Guangzhou	Team
- Source: CricketArchive, 7 January 2022

Mariam Hasan (Urdu: مریم حسن شاہ) (born 19 September 1985) is a Pakistani cricketer who played as a right-arm medium-fast bowler and right-handed batter. She appeared in 3 One Day Internationals and 5 Twenty20 Internationals for Pakistan from 2010 to 2012. She played domestic cricket for Zarai Taraqiati Bank Limited and Omar Associates.

== Career ==
Mariam Hasan made her One Day International debut against Sri Lanka in Potchefstroom, South Africa on 10 October 2010. In 2010, she was part of the Pakistan side that won the cricket gold at the 2010 Asian Games, in China.
