= Jalat Khan (cricketer, born 1986) =

Pakistani cricketer (born 1986)

Personal information
- Born: 3 February 1986 (age 40); Sibi, Balochistan, Pakistan
- Batting: Left-handed
- Bowling: Slow left-arm orthodox

Domestic team information
- Years: Team
- 2003/04–2009/10: Quetta
- 2019: Quetta Gladiators
- 2020–present: Balochistan
Medal record
Representing Pakistan
Men's Cricket
Asian Games
Bronze medal – third place	2010 Guangzhou	Team
- Source: ESPNCricinfo, 13 February 2019

Jalat Khan (born 3 February 1986) is a Pakistani cricketer from Kachi District, Balochistan, Pakistan. He was part of the bronze medal-winning team at the 2010 Asian Games in Guangzhou, China.

== Career ==
Khan made his first-class debut in 2003/2004, and his list-A debut in 2002/2003. Amongst the teams he has played for are: Balochistan Bears, Pakistan Customs, Quetta Bears, Sibi Cricket Association and State Bank of Pakistan.

In November 2010, Khan was part of the Pakistan team at the Asian Games in Guangzhou, China, which won a cricket bronze medal by beating Sri Lanka in the 3rd-place playoffs.

In January 2021, he was named in Balochistan's squad for the 2020–21 Pakistan Cup.
