= Tazia Akhter =

Bangladeshi cricketer (born 1993)

Personal information
- Full name: Tazia Akhter
- Born: 12 December 1993 (age 32); Sylhet, Bangladesh
- Batting: Right-handed
- Bowling: Right-arm
- Role: All-rounder

International information
- National side: Bangladesh (2012–2013)
- ODI debut (cap 16): 6 September 2012 v South Africa
- Last ODI: 12 April 2013 v India
- T20I debut (cap 12): 11 September 2012 v South Africa
- Last T20I: 2 April 2013 v India

Domestic team information
- Years: Team
- 2009/10–2012/13: Khulna Division

Career statistics
Competition	WODI	WT20I	WLA
Matches	4	4	13
Runs scored	11	4	149
Batting average	2.75	1.33	29.80
100s/50s	0/0	0/0	0/0
Top score	7	3	35*
Balls bowled	48	–	252
Wickets	1	–	5
Bowling average	30.00	–	30.60
5 wickets in innings	0	–	0
10 wickets in match	0	–	0
Best bowling	1/18	–	2/11
Catches/stumpings	3/–	0/–	9/–
Medal record
Representing Bangladesh
Women's Cricket
Asian Games
Silver medal – second place	2010 Guangzhou	Team
- Source: CricketArchive, 11 April 2022

Tazia Akhter (Bengali: তাজিয়া আক্তার) (born 12 December 1993) is a Bangladeshi former cricketer who played as an all-rounder. She appeared in four One Day Internationals and four Twenty20 Internationals for Bangladesh in 2012 and 2013. She played domestic cricket for Khulna Division.

== Early life and background ==
Akhter was born on 12 December 1993 in Sylhet, Bangladesh.

== Career ==
=== ODI career ===
Akhter made her ODI debut against South Africa on 6 September 2012.

=== T20I career ===
Akhter's T20I debut was also against South Africa, on 11 September 2012.

=== Asian Games ===
Akhter was a member of the Bangladesh team that won the silver medal in the women's cricket tournament at the 2010 Asian Games in Guangzhou, China.
