= Sana Gulzar =

Pakistani cricketer (born 1992)

Personal information
- Full name: Sana Gulzar
- Born: 20 January 1992 (age 34); Punjab, Pakistan
- Batting: Right-handed
- Bowling: Right-arm offbreak

International information
- National side: Pakistan

Domestic team information
- Years: Team
- 2006/07: Multan Women
Medal record
Representing Pakistan
Women's Cricket
Asian Games
Gold medal – first place	2010 Guangzhou	Team
- Source: ESPN Cricinfo, 12 February 2014

Sana Gulzar (born 20 January 1992) is a cricketer from Pakistan.

== Career ==
Sana was selected to play in the 2010 Asian Games in China, and was part of the gold-medal-winning Pakistan team at the 2010 Games.

Sana was also selected to Pakistan's national squad for their 2011 Women's T20 Quadrangular series in Sri Lanka.
