= Naeem Anjum =

Pakistani cricketer (born 1987)

Medal record

Men's Cricket

Representing Pakistan

Asian Games
Bronze medal – third place	2010 Guangzhou	Team

Naeem Anjum (born 15 September 1987, in Mandi Bahauddin) is an international cricketer from Pakistan. He was part of the bronze medal winning team at the 2010 Asian Games.

== Career ==
A wicket-keeper and batsman, in November 2010 Anjum was part of the Pakistan cricket team at the Asian Games in Guangzhou, China which won a bronze medal by beating Sri Lanka in the 3rd place playoffs.

He has played for Islamabad in the Quaid-i-Azam Trophy since his first-class debut in 2006-07. In 2013-14 he captained the Pakistan Television team in the President’s Trophy first-class competition.
