= Ebrahim Ali =

Ebrahim Ali ابراهيم عالي
- Village
- Location within Iran
- Coordinates: 27°46′38″N 57°09′28″E
- Country: Iran
- Province: Hormozgan
- County: Rudan
- Bakhsh: Rudkhaneh
- Rural District: Mosaferabad

Population (2006)
  - Total: 134
- Time zone: UTC+3:30 (IRST)
  - Summer (DST): UTC+4:30 (IRDT)

Ebrahim Ali (Persian: ابراهيم عالي, also Romanized as Ebrāhīm ‘Alī) is a village in Mosaferabad Rural District, Rudkhaneh District, Rudan County, Hormozgan Province, Iran. At the 2006 census, its population was 134, in 24 families.
