= Chamely Khatun =

Bangladeshi cricketer (born 1988)

Personal information
- Full name: Chamely Khatun
- Born: 11 November 1988 (age 38); Rajshahi, Bangladesh
- Batting: Right-handed
- Bowling: Right-arm medium
- Role: Batter

Domestic team information
- Years: Team
- 2008/09-2012/13: Dhaka Division

Career statistics
Competition	WLA
Matches	10
Runs scored	75
Batting average	10.71
100s/50s	0/0
Top score	21
Catches/stumpings	0/–
Medal record
Representing Bangladesh
Women's Cricket
Asian Games
Silver medal – second place	2010 Guangzhou	Team
- Source: CricketArchive, 17 April 2022

Chamely Khatun (Bengali: চামেলী খাতুন) (born 11 November 1988) is a Bangladeshi former cricketer who played as a right-handed batter. She played for Bangladesh between 2007 and 2011, before the side was granted full international status. She played domestic cricket for Dhaka Division.

== Career ==
=== Asian Games ===
Chamely was part of the team that won the silver medal in the women's cricket tournament at the 2010 Asian Games in Guangzhou, China.
