= Sarmad Bhatti =

Pakistani cricketer (born 1991)

Medal record

Men's Cricket

Representing Pakistan

Asian Games
Bronze medal – third place	2010 Guangzhou	Team

Sarmad Bhatti (born 26 September 1991, Khairpur) is an international cricketer from Pakistan.

== Career ==
In January 2010 he was part of the Pakistan squad for the ICC Under-19 Cricket World Cup in New Zealand. Then in November, Bhatti was part of the team at the Asian Games in Guangzhou, China. He won a bronze medal as part of the team that defeated Sri Lanka in the third place playoffs.

In April 2018, he was named in Federal Areas' squad for the 2018 Pakistan Cup.
