= Naeemuddin (Pakistani cricketer) =

Pakistani cricketer (born 1981)

Personal information
- Born: 17 June 1981 (age 45); Gujranwala, Pakistan
- Batting: Left-handed
- Bowling: Right arm offbreak
Medal record
Representing Pakistan
Men's Cricket
Asian Games
Bronze medal – third place	2010 Guangzhou	Team
- Source: Cricinfo, 1 November 2015

Naeemuddin (born 17 June 1981) is a Pakistani former first-class cricketer. He played for multiple first-class cricket teams including Sialkot. He appeared in more than 90 first-class matches from 2007 to 2018.

== Career ==
In November 2014, Naeemuddin, in the 2014-15 Quaid-e-Azam Trophy (Gold) match scored an unbeaten 113-run innings, leading his team, SNGPL, to a narrow four-wicket victory over the Peshawar Panthers in critical sixth round.
