= Mohammad Irshad =

Pakistani cricketer (born 1995)

Medal record

Men's Cricket

Representing Pakistan

Asian Games
Bronze medal – third place	2010 Guangzhou	Team

Muhammad Irshad (born 3 August 1995) is a Pakistani first-class cricketer who plays for Service Industries and Sui Gas Corporation of Pakistan as a right-arm medium-fast. He has also represented the PCB Patron's XI.

== Early life ==
Irshad was born in Malakand, Pakistan.

== Career ==
In November 2010, Irshad was part of the team at the 2010 Asian Games in Guangzhou, China which won a bronze medal by beating Sri Lanka in the third place playoffs.
