= Sami Agha =

Afghan cricketer (born 1989)

Personal information
- Full name: Mohammad Sami Agha
- Born: 17 June 1989 (age 37); Kandahar, Kandahar Province, Afghanistan
- Batting: Right-handed

International information
- National side: Afghanistan

Domestic team information
- Years: Team
- 2011/12: Afghan Cheetahs
- 2017/18: Boost Region

Career statistics
Competition	FC	T20
Matches	5	2
Runs scored	208	10
Batting average	23.11	5.00
100s/50s	0/2	0/0
Top score	75	10
Catches/stumpings	2/–	0/–
Medal record
Representing Afghanistan
Men's Cricket
Asian Games
Silver medal – second place	2010 Guangzhou	Team
- Source: Cricinfo, 3 December 2020

Mohammad Sami Agha (born 17 June 1989) is an Afghan cricketer. Sami is a right-handed batsman. He was born at Kandahar, Kandahar Province.

Sami played a single match for Afghanistan against Hong Kong in the quarter-finals of the cricket competition at the 2010 Asian Games. Afghanistan eventually won the silver medal. Sami made his Twenty20 debut for the Afghan Cheetahs in the Faysal Bank Twenty-20 Cup against Rawalpindi Rams. He played a further match in that competition, against Faisalabad Wolves. In these two matches, he scored a total of 10 runs at an average of 5.00, with a high score of 10.

He made his first-class debut for Boost Region in the 2017–18 Ahmad Shah Abdali 4-day Tournament on 26 October 2017.
