= Sultana Yesmin =

Bangladeshi cricketer (born 1989)

Personal information
- Full name: Sultana Yesmin Boishakhi
- Born: 13 August 1989 (age 37); Bangladesh
- Batting: Right-handed
- Role: Wicket-keeper

International information
- National side: Bangladesh (2011–2013)
- ODI debut (cap 11): 26 November 2011 v Ireland
- Last ODI: 24 September 2013 v South Africa
- Only T20I (cap 20): 5 April 2013 v India

Domestic team information
- Years: Team
- 2008/09–2017/18: Khulna Division

Career statistics
Competition	WODI	WT20I
Matches	6	1
Runs scored	17	–
Batting average	3.40	–
100s/50s	0/0	–
Top score	11	–
Catches/stumpings	4/5	0/0
Medal record
Representing Bangladesh
Women's Cricket
Asian Games
Silver medal – second place	2010 Guangzhou	Team
- Source: CricketArchive, 13 April 2022

Sultana Yesmin Boishakhi (Bengali: সুলতানা ইয়াসমিন) (born 13 August 1989) is a Bangladeshi former cricketer who played as a wicket-keeper and right-handed batter. She appeared in seven One Day Internationals and one Twenty20 International for Bangladesh from 2011 to 2013. She played domestic cricket for Khulna Division.

== Early life and background ==
Yesmin was born on 13 August 1989 in Bangladesh.

== Career ==
=== ODI career ===
Yesmin made her ODI debut against Ireland on 26 November 2011.

=== T20I career ===
Yesmin made her T20I debut against India on 5 April 2013.

=== Asian games ===
Yesmin was a member of the team that won a silver medal in the women's cricket tournament at the 2010 Asian Games in Guangzhou, China.
