= Lal Kumar =

Pakistani cricketer (born 1987)

Personal information
- Full name: Lal Kumar
- Born: 25 October 1987 (age 39); Mithi, Sindh, Pakistan
- Batting: Left-handed
- Bowling: Left-arm fast
- Role: All-rounder

Domestic team information
- Years: Team
- 2007–: Hyderabad
- 2010: Sindh
- 2005-: Hyderabad Hawks
- 2009/10: Sindh Dolphins

Career statistics
Competition	FC	LA	T20
Matches	71	30	20
Runs scored	2492	462	164
Batting average	30.02	20.08	12.61
100s/50s	4/11	0/2	0/0
Top score	133	62	40
Balls bowled	6622	1124	324
Wickets	117	31	13
Bowling average	32.22	33.74	38.92
5 wickets in innings	5	0	0
10 wickets in match	0	0	0
Best bowling	7/100	3/22	3/43
Catches/stumpings	22/–	6/–	4/–
Medal record
Representing Pakistan
Men's Cricket
Asian Games
Bronze medal – third place	2010 Guangzhou	Team
- Source: Cricinfo, September 17, 2014

Lal Kumar (Urdu: لال کمار, Sindhi لال ڪمار born 25 October 1987, in Mithi) is a Pakistani cricketer who has played first-class cricket for the Hyderabad cricket team (Pakistan), Hyderabad Hawks, and the Rest of Pakistan Under-19's.

He is a left-hand batsman and a left-arm pace bowler, Kumar has scored 319 runs (average of 22.78) and taken 31 wickets (average of 24.83) in 9 first-class games. His highest score is 63 runs, and his best bowling figures in a match were 8 wickets for 135 runs. He was also part of the bronze medal-winning Pakistan team at the 2010 Asian Games.

In February 2021, he began to undertake coaching courses with the Pakistan Cricket Board.
