= Sheharyar Ghani =

Pakistani cricketer (born 1985)

Personal information
- Born: 9 September 1985 (age 41); Karachi, Pakistan
- Batting: Right-handed
- Bowling: Right-arm fast medium
- Role: Batsman

Domestic team information
- Years: Team
- 2008 –: Karachi Dolphins
- 2000/01: Karachi Blues
- 2007/08: Pakistan A
- 2009 –: Karachi Zebras

Career statistics
Competition	FC	LA
Matches	43	32
Runs scored	2,427	833
Batting average	36.77	27.76
100s/50s	5/9	1/5
Top score	181*	105*
Balls bowled	126	29
Wickets	1	1
Bowling average	77.00	29.00
5 wickets in innings	0	0
10 wickets in match	0	0
Best bowling	1/46	1/25
Catches/stumpings	17/–	12/–
Medal record
Representing Pakistan
Men's Cricket
Asian Games
Bronze medal – third place	2010 Guangzhou	Team
- Source: ESPNcricinfo, 12 April 2012

Sheharyar Ghani (Urdu: شہریارغنی; born, 9 September 1985) is an international cricketer from Pakistan. He was part of the bronze medal-winning team at the 2010 Asian Games in Guangzhou, China.

== Career ==
=== 2010 ===
In November, Ghani was part of the team at the Asian Games in Guangzhou, China which won a bronze medal by beating Sri Lanka in the 3rd place playoffs.
