= Sarita Magar =

Nepali cricketer (born 1992)

Personal information
- Full name: Sarita Magar
- Born: 22 July 1992 (age 34); Nepal
- Batting: Right-handed
- Bowling: Left-arm medium-fast
- Role: All-rounder

International information
- National side: Nepal
- T20I debut (cap 5): 12 January 2019 v China
- Last T20I: 20 May 2022 v Uganda

Career statistics
Competition	WT20I
Matches	24
Runs scored	118
Batting average	9.83
100s/50s	0/0
Top score	22
Balls bowled	177
Wickets	7
Bowling average	19.14
5 wickets in innings	0
10 wickets in match	0
Best bowling	4/11
Catches/stumpings	6/–
Medal record
Representing Nepal
Women's Cricket
South Asian Games
Bronze medal – third place	2019 Kathmandu/Pokhara	Team
- Source: Cricinfo, 20 May 2022

Sarita Magar (Nepali: सरिता मगर is a Nepali cricketer and an all-rounder of Nepali National Cricket team. She bats right handed and bowls right-arm medium-fast. She played in the 2014 Asian Games as a part of the Nepal women's national cricket team. She has also played in Women's T20 Qualifier's Asian Region.

== International career ==
Magar made her international debut in January-2019 against China in Thailand women's T20 smash tournament. She also represented Nepal in the 2019 ICC Women's Qualifier Asia in Bangkok, Thailand. This is a tournament which is an Asia region qualifier for the 2019 ICC Women's World Twenty20 Qualifier as well as the 2020 Women's Cricket World Cup Qualifier tournaments, with the top team progressing to both of them.

In October 2021, she was named in Nepal's side for the 2021 ICC Women's T20 World Cup Asia Qualifier tournament in the United Arab Emirates.
