= Champa Chakma =

Bangladeshi cricketer (born 1992)

Personal information
- Full name: Champa Chakma
- Born: 1 January 1992 (age 34); Chittagong, Bangladesh
- Batting: Left-handed
- Bowling: Slow left-arm orthodox
- Role: Bowler

Domestic team information
- Years: Team
- 2008/09–2012/13: Chittagong Division

Umpiring information
- WT20Is umpired: 7 (2025)

Career statistics
Competition	WLA
Matches	5
Runs scored	25
Batting average	5.00
100s/50s	0/0
Top score	11
Balls bowled	118
Wickets	1
Bowling average	115.00
5 wickets in innings	0
10 wickets in match	0
Best bowling	1/33
Catches/stumpings	0/–
Medal record
Representing Bangladesh
Women's Cricket
Asian Games
Silver medal – second place	2010 Guangzhou	Team
- Source: CricketArchive, 17 April 2022

Champa Chakma (Chakma: 𑄌𑄧𑄟𑄴𑄛 𑄌𑄇𑄴𑄟, Bengali: চম্পা চাকমা; born 1 January 1992) is a Bangladeshi former cricketer who played as a slow left-arm orthodox bowler. She played for Bangladesh between 2007 and 2011, before the side was granted full international status. She played domestic cricket for Chittagong Division. She is now an umpire.

== Career ==
=== Asian Games ===
Champa was a member of the squad that won a silver medal in the women's cricket tournament at the 2010 Asian Games in Guangzhou, China, although she did not get a chance to play a match during their campaign.

Chakma is one of the subjects of the 2008 documentary Stories of Change, which shows the struggles of five successful Bangladeshi women.

Chakma has been an umpire at senior level in Bangladesh since 2024, and was one of the umpires for the ICC Women's Emerging Nations Trophy tournament in Bangkok in November 2025.
