= Tithy Sarkar =

Bangladeshi cricketer (born 1990)

Personal information
- Full name: Tithy Rani Sarkar
- Born: 12 August 1990 (age 36); Chittagong, Bangladesh
- Batting: Right-handed
- Bowling: Right-arm off break
- Role: Bowler

International information
- National side: Bangladesh (2012)
- Only ODI (cap 13): 21 August 2012 v Ireland
- T20I debut (cap 13): 11 September 2012 v South Africa
- Last T20I: 12 September 2012 v South Africa

Domestic team information
- Years: Team
- 2011/12: Dhaka Division
- 2012/13: Rangpur Division
- 2017/18: Chittagong Division

Career statistics
Competition	WODI	WT20I	WLA	WT20
Matches	1	2	7	8
Runs scored	7	7	16	19
Batting average	7.00	–	5.33	11.60
100s/50s	0/0	0/0	0/0	0/0
Top score	7	7*	8*	19
Balls bowled	12	12	330	150
Wickets	0	0	7	6
Bowling average	–	–	20.85	19.00
5 wickets in innings	0	0	0	0
10 wickets in match	0	0	0	0
Best bowling	–	–	2/9	3/6
Catches/stumpings	0/–	0/–	1/–	1/–
Medal record
Representing Bangladesh
Women's Cricket
Asian Games
Silver medal – second place	2010 Guangzhou	Team
- Source: ESPN Cricinfo, 13 April 2022

Tithy Rani Sarkar (Bengali: তিথী রানী সরকার) (born 12 August 1990) is a Bangladeshi former cricketer who played as a right-arm off break bowler. She appeared in one One Day International and two Twenty20 Internationals for Bangladesh in 2012. She played domestic cricket for Dhaka Division, Rangpur Division, and Chittagong Division.

== Early life and background ==
Sarkar was born on 12 August 1990 in Chittagong, Bangladesh.

== Career ==
=== ODI career ===
Sarkar made her ODI debut against Ireland on 21 August 2012.

=== T20I career ===
Sarkar made her T20I debut against India on 11 September 2012.

=== Asian games ===
Sarkar was a member of the team that won the silver medal in the women's cricket tournament at the 2010 Asian Games in Guangzhou, China.
