= Mariko Yamamoto =

Japanese cricketer (born 1983)

Personal information
- Full name: Mariko Yamamoto
- Born: 12 October 1983 (age 43); Kanagawa, Japan
- Batting: Right-handed
- Bowling: Right-arm medium

International information
- National side: Japan (2006–2014)

Career statistics
Competition	List A	WT20
Matches	5	4
Runs scored	90	17
Batting average	18.00	4.25
100s/50s	0/0	0/0
Top score	38	10
Balls bowled	222	–
Wickets	4	–
Bowling average	47.75	–
5 wickets in innings	0	–
10 wickets in match	0	–
Best bowling	3/65	–
Catches/stumpings	4/–	0/–
Medal record
Representing Japan
Women's Cricket
Asian Games
Bronze medal – third place	2010 Guangzhou	Team
- Source: CricketArchive, 5 March 2017

Mariko Yamamoto (山本 万里子; born 12 October 1983) is a Japanese former cricketer, who has played for the women's national cricket team. She was part of Japan's squad for the 2011 Women's Cricket World Cup Qualifier and the 2013 ICC Women's World Twenty20 Qualifier.

Known mainly as a right-handed batter, she bowls right-arm medium. Yamamoto was a member of the Japanese team that won the bronze medal in the women's cricket competition at the 2010 Asian Games in Guangzhou.

She attended Chuo University and works as a bank teller.
