= Mahbubul Alam (cricketer) =

Bangladeshi cricketer (born 1983)

Personal information
- Full name: Mahbubul Alam
- Born: 1 December 1983 (age 42); Faridpur, Dhaka, Bangladesh
- Nickname: Robin
- Batting: Right-handed
- Bowling: Right-arm medium-fast
- Role: Bowler

International information
- National side: Bangladesh
- Test debut (cap 52): 25 October 2008 v New Zealand
- Last Test: 26 December 2008 v Sri Lanka
- ODI debut (cap 94): 10 January 2009 v Zimbabwe
- Last ODI: 16 August 2009 v Zimbabwe

Domestic team information
- Years: Team
- 2003/04–present: Dhaka Division
- 2012–present: Dhaka Gladiators

Career statistics
Competition	Test	ODI	FC	LA
Matches	4	5	26	28
Runs scored	5	81	144	143
Batting average	1.25	40.50	6.54	17.22
100s/50s	0/0	0/1	0/0	0/1
Top score	2	59	20	59
Balls bowled	587	222	4,143	1,214
Wickets	5	7	77	32
Bowling average	62.80	40.00	26.72	33.28
5 wickets in innings	0	0	1	0
10 wickets in match	0	0	0	0
Best bowling	2/62	2/42	5/47	4/34
Catches/stumpings	0/–	1/–	10/–	8/–
Medal record
Representing Bangladesh
Men's Cricket
Asian Games
Gold medal – first place	2010 Guangzhou	Team
- Source: ESPNcricinfo, 13 January 2010

Mahbubul Alam Robin (born 1 December 1983) is a Bangladeshi cricketer who as of 14 August 2009 has played four Tests and four One Day Internationals (ODI). Despite having a first-class batting average of less than seven, Mahbub scored 59 from 43 deliveries in a One Day International against Zimbabwe in Bulawayo in August 2009.

According to Bangladesh's coach, Champaka Ramanayake, Mahbub is "a bowler who depends heavily on rhythm".
