= Ayesha Akhter =

Bangladeshi cricketer (born 1984)

Personal information
- Full name: Ayesha Akhter
- Born: 14 January 1984 (age 42); Jamalpur, Bangladesh
- Batting: Right-handed
- Role: Batter

International information
- National side: Bangladesh (2012–2013)
- ODI debut (cap 14): 23 August 2012 v Ireland
- Last ODI: 8 April 2013 v India
- Only T20I (cap 18): 5 April 2013 v India

Domestic team information
- Years: Team
- 2008/09–2012/13: Dhaka Division
- 2017–2017/18: Chittagong Division

Career statistics
Competition	WODI	WT20I	WLA	WT20
Matches	3	1	20	7
Runs scored	12	12	328	148
Batting average	4.00	12.00	18.22	21.14
100s/50s	0/0	0/0	0/1	0/1
Top score	8	12	74*	51
Balls bowled	–	–	108	–
Wickets	–	–	3	–
Bowling average	–	–	21.66	–
5 wickets in innings	–	–	0	–
10 wickets in match	–	–	0	–
Best bowling	–	–	3/35	–
Catches/stumpings	0/–	0/–	0/–	1/–
Medal record
Representing Bangladesh
Women's Cricket
Asian Games
Silver medal – second place	2010 Guangzhou	Team
- Source: CricketArchive, 26 May 2022

Ayesha Akhter (Bengali: আয়েশা আকতার; born 14 January 1984) is a Bangladeshi former cricketer who played as a right-handed batter and an occasional bowler. Debuting in ODIs in August 2012 and in T20Is in April 2013, she appeared in three One Day Internationals and one Twenty20 International for Bangladesh in 2012 and 2013. She played domestic cricket for Dhaka Division and Chittagong Division.
