= Dolar Mahmud =

Bangladeshi cricketer (born 1988)

Personal information
- Full name: Mohammed Dolar Mahmud
- Born: 30 December 1988 (age 37); Narail, Khuna, Bangladesh
- Batting: Right-handed
- Bowling: Right-arm fast-medium
- Role: Bowler

International information
- National side: Bangladesh
- ODI debut (cap 91): 8 June 2008 v Pakistan
- Last ODI: 29 October 2009 v Zimbabwe

Domestic team information
- Years: Team
- 2004–present: Khulna Division

Career statistics
Competition	ODI	FC	LA
Matches	8	25	24
Runs scored	20	559	139
Batting average	6.66	13.97	8.68
100s/50s	0/0	0/2	0/0
Top score	20	65	27
Balls bowled	103	3,576	855
Wickets	7	73	25
Bowling average	55.00	26.97	32.60
5 wickets in innings	0	2	1
10 wickets in match	0	0	0
Best bowling	4/28	7/52	5/47
Catches/stumpings	0/–	9/–	6/–
Medal record
Representing Bangladesh
Men's Cricket
Asian Games
Gold medal – first place	2010 Guangzhou	Team
- Source: CricketArchive, 24 January 2009

Mohammed Dolar Mahmud (Bengali: মোহাম্মদ ডলার মাহমুদ; born 30 December 1988) is a Bangladeshi first-class cricketer. A former Bangladesh Under-19's representative, he plays domestic cricket for Khulna Division. Mahmud has also played for Bangladesh A. He made his One Day International debut in 2008.

He picked up a 4/28 match winning haul to win the match against Zimbabwe at Zimbabwe in 2009 for which he won the man of the match award.
