= Shizuka Miyaji =

Japanese cricketer (born 1981)

Personal information
- Full name: Shizuka Miyaji
- Born: November 4, 1981 (age 45); Nishinomiya, Japan
- Batting: Left-handed
- Bowling: Left-arm orthodox

International information
- National side: Japan
- T20I debut (cap 7): 6 May 2019 v Indonesia
- Last T20I: 30 October 2022 v Hong Kong

Career statistics
Competition	WT20I
Matches	13
Runs scored	173
Batting average	21.62
100s/50s	0/0
Top score	47
Balls bowled	272
Wickets	8
Bowling average	28.50
5 wickets in innings	0
10 wickets in match	0
Best bowling	2/19
Catches/stumpings	1/–
Medal record
Representing Japan
Women's Cricket
Asian Games
Bronze medal – third place	2010 Guangzhou	Team
- Source: Cricinfo, 8 November 2022

Shizuka Miyaji (Japanese: 宮地静香, Hepburn: Miyaji Shizuka) is a Japanese cricketer. She was a member of the Japanese cricket team which secured the bronze medal at the 2010 Asian Games which was held in China defeating the China women's national cricket team in the 3rd-place playoff.

Shizuka made her One Day International debut at the 2011 Women's Cricket World Cup Qualifier. She also captained the Japanese cricket team at the 2013 ICC Women's World Twenty20 Qualifier. In April 2019, she was named in Japan's squad for the 2019 ICC Women's Qualifier EAP tournament in Vanuatu. She made her Women's Twenty20 International (WT20I) debut for Japan against Indonesia in the Women's Qualifier EAP tournament on 6 May 2019.
