= Shizuka Kubota =

Japanese cricketer (born 1983)

Personal information
- Full name: Shizuka Kubota
- Born: 12 July 1983 (age 43); Tokyo, Japan
- Batting: Right-handed
- Bowling: Right-arm medium

International information
- National side: Japan
- ODI debut (cap 7): 21 July 2003 v Pakistan
- Last ODI: 26 July 2003 v West Indies

Career statistics
Competition	WODI
Matches	5
Runs scored	27
Batting average	5.40
100s/50s	0/0
Top score	14
Catches/stumpings	1/–
Medal record
Representing Japan
Women's Cricket
Asian Games
Bronze medal – third place	2010 Guangzhou	Team
- Source: ESPNcricinfo, 25 September 2011

Shizuka Kubota (窪田 静, Kubota Shizuka; born 12 July 1983) is a Japanese former cricketer who played five Women's One Day International cricket matches for Japan national women's cricket team in 2003. Her debut ODI match was against Pakistan on 21 July 2003. She also played the last of her ODIs that same week.
