= Shohely Akhter =

Bangladeshi cricketer (born 1988)

Personal information
- Full name: Shohely Akhter Khatun
- Born: 16 June 1988 (age 38); Rajbari, Bangladesh
- Batting: Right-handed
- Bowling: Right-arm off break
- Role: Bowler

International information
- National side: Bangladesh (2013–2022)
- ODI debut (cap 19): 10 April 2013 v India
- Last ODI: 6 March 2014 v Pakistan
- T20I debut (cap 17): 2 April 2013 v India
- Last T20I: 1 October 2022 v Thailand

Domestic team information
- Years: Team
- 2008/09–2017/18: Dhaka Division

Career statistics
Competition	WODI	WT20I	WLA	WT20
Matches	2	5	13	10
Runs scored	1	3	124	39
Batting average	0	3	13.77	6.50
100s/50s	0/0	0/0	0/0	0/0
Top score	0	3	34	16
Balls bowled	90	78	552	198
Wickets	3	0	16	2
Bowling average	16.33	–	17.87	94.00
5 wickets in innings	0	–	0	0
10 wickets in match	0	–	0	0
Best bowling	3/13	–	4/18	1/15
Catches/stumpings	0/–	0/–	5/–	1/–
- Source: CricketArchive, 2 October 2022

Shohely Akhter Khatun (Bengali: সোহেলী আক্তার) (born 16 June 1988) is a Bangladeshi cricketer who plays as a right-arm off break bowler. She appeared in two One Day Internationals and five Twenty20 Internationals for Bangladesh in 2013 and 2014. She played domestic cricket for Dhaka Division. In September 2022, she was selected in the Bangladesh squad for the Women's T20 Asia Cup, returning to the national team after 8 years.

Akhter was born on 16 June 1988 in Rajbari District. She was part of the team that won the silver medal in the women's cricket tournament at the 2010 Asian Games in Guangzhou, China.

== International ban ==
Akhter was banned from all forms of cricket for five years by the International Cricket Council after she admitted breaching five provisions of the ICC anti-corruption code. She made an offer of ৳2 million (US$16,400 approx.) to a Bangladeshi player to get out hit-wicket during the match between Bangladesh and Australia in the 2023 Women's T20 World Cup which was held in South Africa. For failing to report those approaches made by her to the player, she was found guilty of breaching the ICC Anti-Corruption Code 2.1.1, 2.1.3, 2.1.4, 2.4.4 and 2.4.7 and was handed a five-year ban, starting 10 February 2025. She became the first female cricketer to be banned for corruption.

== Personal life ==
Akhter is currently teaching at Guidance International School, from the start of 2024 as a physical exercise teacher.
