= Erika Ida =

Japanese cricketer

Personal information
- Born: October 20, 1994 (age 32); Gunma, Japan

International information
- National side: Japan
Medal record
Representing Japan
Women's Cricket
Asian Games
Bronze medal – third place	2010 Guangzhou	Team
- Source: Cricinfo, 9 January 2018

Erika Ida (Kanji:井田 恵里香, born 20 October 1994) is a Japanese cricketer who plays as a right-handed batter. She was a member of the Japanese cricket team which won the bronze medal at the 2010 Asian Games. She also competed at the 2014 Asian Games representing the national team.

Kurumi also featured in the national team at the 2013 ICC Women's World Twenty20 Qualifier.
