= Yuka Yoshida (cricketer) =

Japanese cricketer

Personal information
- Born: March 20, 1989 (age 37); Nara, Japan
- Batting: Right-handed
- Bowling: Right-arm medium

International information
- National side: Japan
Medal record
Representing Japan
Women's Cricket
Asian Games
Bronze medal – third place	2010 Guangzhou	Team
- Source: Cricinfo, 13 November 2017

Yuka Yoshida (吉田侑加, Yoshida Yuka; born 20 March 1989) is a Japanese cricketer. She was also a member of the Japanese cricket team which secured the bronze medal at the 2010 Asian Games which were held in China. Japan defeated the hosts China in the 3rd place playoff.
