= Ayako Nakayama =

Japanese cricketer

Personal information
- Full name: Ayako Nakayama
- Born: September 1, 1987 (age 39); Tokyo, Japan
- Batting: Right-handed
- Bowling: Legbreak googly

International information
- National side: Japan
Medal record
Representing Japan
Women's Cricket
Asian Games
Bronze medal – third place	2010 Guangzhou	Team
- Source: Cricinfo, 8 January 2018

Ayako Nakayama (Kanji:中山 綾子, born 1 September 1987) is a Japanese cricketer. A right-handed batter, she was a member of the Japanese cricket team which won the bronze medal at the 2010 Asian Games. She too competed at the 2014 Asian Games.

Ayako was also the part of the national team at the 2013 Women's World Twenty20 Qualifier.
