= Ema Kuribayashi =

Japanese cricketer

Personal information
- Full name: Ema Kuribayashi
- Born: 6 October 1983 (age 43); Nerima-ku, Tokyo, Japan
- Batting: Left-handed
- Bowling: Right-arm medium-fast
- Role: Wicket-keeper

International information
- National side: Japan
- ODI debut (cap 8): 21 July 2003 v Pakistan
- Last ODI: 26 July 2003 v West Indies

Career statistics
Competition	WODI
Matches	5
Runs scored	27
Batting average	5.40
100s/50s	0/0
Top score	18
Balls bowled	24
Wickets	0
Bowling average	–
5 wickets in innings	–
10 wickets in match	–
Best bowling	–
Catches/stumpings	1/1
Medal record
Representing Japan
Women's Cricket
Asian Games
Bronze medal – third place	2010 Guangzhou	Team
- Source: ESPNcricinfo, 30 May 2020

Ema Kuribayashi (栗林 江麻, Kuribayashi Ema; born 6 October 1983) is a Japanese ex-cricketer who played five Women's One Day Internationals in 2003. She was born in Tokyo in 1983.

At the 2010 Asian Games, Kuribayashi led Japan to a bronze medal, beating China by 7 wickets in a low-scoring match. Her 24* was the highest score for Japan in the match. Kuribayashi's debut ODI match was against Pakistan on 21 July 2003.
