= Atsuko Kitamura =

Japanese cricketer

Atsuoko Kitamura
Personal information
- Born: 11 June 1984 (age 41); Kanagawa, Japan
- Batting: Right-handed
- Bowling: Right-arm medium

International information
- National side: Japan
- Source: Cricinfo, 13 January 2018

Atsuko Kitamura (北村温子, Kitamura Atsuko; née Suda (須田)) is a Japanese cricketer, who has played for the women's national cricket team. Known mainly for her right-arm medium bowling, she made her international debut at the 2013 ICC Women's World Twenty20 Qualifier.
