= Ayako Miyazaki =

Japanese cricketer

Personal information
- Full name: Ayako Miyazaki
- Born: 9 March 1982 (age 44); Japan
- Batting: Right-handed
- Bowling: Right-arm medium-fast

International information
- National side: Japan
- ODI debut (cap 13): 22 July 2003 v Ireland
- Last ODI: 26 July 2003 v West Indies

Career statistics
| Competition | WODI |
|---|---|
| Matches | 4 |
| Runs scored | 23 |
| Batting average | 5.75 |
| 100s/50s | 0/0 |
| Top score | 9 |
| Balls bowled | 60 |
| Wickets | 1 |
| Bowling average | 57.00 |
| 5 wickets in innings | 0 |
| 10 wickets in match | 0 |
| Best bowling | 1/41 |
| Catches/stumpings | 0/0 |
- Source: ESPNcricinfo, 25 September 2011

Ayako Miyazaki (宮崎綾子, Miyazaki Ayako; née Iwasaki (岩﨑)) is a Japanese former cricketer who played four Women's One Day International cricket matches for Japan national women's cricket team, all in July 2003.
