= Guanggong International Cricket Stadium =

Stadium in China

City Forex Stadium
- (广工板球场)
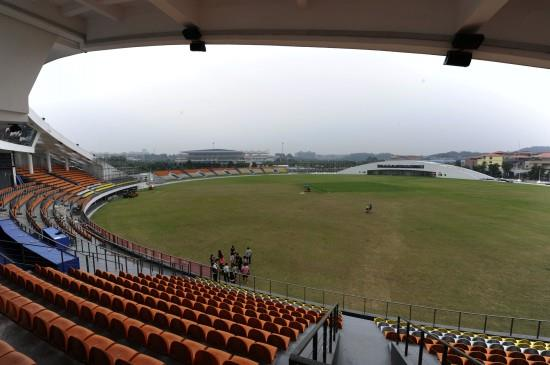
- Guangong International Cricket Stadium
- Interactive map of City Forex Stadium

Ground information
- Location: Guangzhou, Guangdong, China
- Country: China
- Coordinates: 23°02′22″N 113°23′10″E
- Establishment: 2010
- Capacity: 12,000
- Owner: Chinese Cricket Association
- Tenants: China
- End names
- n/a n/a

International information
- First women's T20I: 28 October 2012: Bangladesh v Sri Lanka
- Last women's T20I: 31 October 2012: India v Pakistan

Team information
Guangzhou Scorpions (some Australian football matches) GZ United (some cricket matches) Guangzhou Rams (some rugby matches)	(2010-)
Asian Games	(2010)

The City Forex Stadium (Chinese: 广工板球场) is an international cricket stadium in Guangzhou, Guangdong, China. It is used mostly for cricket and also for Australian football, rugby tens, rugby union and touch rugby. GZ United are the tenants of the stadium.

The stadium is located in the Guangdong University of Technology in the Higher Education Mega Centre and encompassing an area of 6355 m^{2}, with seating for 12,000 spectators. The stadium hosted the first international-level cricket ever played in China.

It has been granted by the International Cricket Council to host One Day International and Twenty20 cricket matches. It was established in 2010. It hosted both the men's and women's cricket matches played in the 2010 Asian Games. It also hosted the 2012 Women's Asia Cup cricket tournament.

Work on the stadium started in May 2008. However, even until August 2009, the ground was little more than a flattened patch of mud. The ground now has a full-time Bangladeshi curator Jasimuddin, who had previously managed the Kinrara Oval in Malaysia.

The ground was designed by Chinese architects with materials sourced from Guangdong Province, the wicket square using clay from Shaanxi Province in central China, the certified seed turf being imported by the Chinese Cricket Association from the United States.
