= Kurumi Ota =

Japanese cricketer

Personal information
- Born: July 3, 1987 (age 39); Tokyo, Japan
- Batting: Left-handed
- Bowling: Right-arm medium

International information
- National side: Japan
- T20I debut (cap 25): 25 May 2023 v Hong Kong
- Last T20I: 8 October 2024 v Hong Kong
Medal record
Representing Japan
Women's Cricket
Asian Games
Bronze medal – third place	2010 Guangzhou	Team
- Source: Cricinfo, 30 October 2024

Kurumi Ota (Japanese: 大田 くる美; born 3 July 1987) is a Japanese cricketer. She was a member of the Japanese cricket team which won the bronze medal at the 2010 Asian Games. She also competed at the 2014 Asian Games representing the national team at the cricket tournament.

Kurumi was also a part of the national team at the 2013 Women's World Twenty20 Qualifier.
