= Sarika Prasad =

Indian cricket umpire (born 1959)

Personal information
- Full name: Sarika Siva Prasad
- Born: 7 November 1959 (age 67); Visakhapatnam, India

Umpiring information
- ODIs umpired: 12 (2012–2018)
- T20Is umpired: 49 (2008–2024)
- WODIs umpired: 16 (2009–2022)
- WT20Is umpired: 27 (2012–2023)
- Source: Cricinfo, 25 September 2019

Sarika Siva Prasad (born 7 November 1959) is an Indian-born international cricket umpire based in Singapore. He officiated in five matches during the 2009 Women's Cricket World Cup, including the 3rd-place playoff match. Prasad was born in Visakhapatnam, India.

He was one of the on-field umpires for the 2022 ICC Under-19 Cricket World Cup in the West Indies.

== See also ==
- List of One Day International cricket umpires
- List of Twenty20 International cricket umpires
