= Bangladesh women's cricket team in Ireland in 2012 =

Bangladeshi women's cricket team in Ireland in 2012
	Ireland	Bangladesh
- Date: 21 August 2012
Captains	Isobel Joyce	Salma Khatun

One Day International series
- Results: Ireland won the 1-match series 1–0
Most runs	Isobel Joyce (43)	Lata Mondal (25)
Most wickets	Louise McCarthy (4)	Rumana Ahmed (2); Salma Khatun (2)

The Bangladesh women's national cricket team toured Ireland in August 2012. They played in the two Ireland Women's Tri-Series, in ODI and T20I formats, against Ireland and Pakistan. They also separately played Pakistan in 1 ODI and 1 T20I, and against Ireland in 1 ODI. The T20I matches were the first ever played by Bangladesh in the format.

== Squads ==
Ireland	Bangladesh	Pakistan
Isobel Joyce (c); Laura Cullen; Laura Delany; Emma Flanagan; Kim Garth; Cecelia Joyce; Shauna Kavanagh; Amy Kenealy; Louise McCarthy; Eimear Richardson; Melissa Scott-Hayward; Clare Shillington; Elena Tice; Mary Waldron (wk)	Salma Khatun (c); Rumana Ahmed; Sharmin Akhter; Jahanara Alam; Panna Ghosh; Fargana Hoque; Sanjida Islam; Khadija Tul Kubra; Lata Mondal; Ritu Moni; Ayasha Rahman; Shukhtara Rahman; Tithy Sarkar; Nuzhat Tasnia (wk); Sultana Yesmin (wk)	Sana Mir (c); Nain Abidi; Nida Dar; Batool Fatima (wk); Asmavia Iqbal; Marina Iqbal; Qanita Jalil; Masooma Junaid; Elizebath Khan; Nahida Khan; Javeria Khan; Bismah Maroof; Javeria Rauf; Sadia Yousuf

== Only ODI: Bangladesh v Pakistan ==
Pakistan women's cricket team against Bangladesh in Ireland 2012
	Bangladesh	Pakistan
- Dates: 20 – 27 August 2012
Captains	Salma Khatun	Sana Mir

One Day International series
- Results: Pakistan won the 1-match series 1–0
Most runs	Rumana Ahmed (42)	Bismah Maroof (67)
Most wickets	3 bowlers (1)	Sadia Yousuf (4); Sana Mir (4)

Twenty20 International series
- Results: 1-match series drawn 0–0

20 August 2012
Scorecard

Pakistan; 180/6 (50 overs)	v	Bangladesh; 138 (46.3 overs)
Bismah Maroof 67* (99); Lata Mondal 1/20 (7 overs)		Rumana Ahmed 42 (103); Sadia Yousuf 4/26 (8.3 overs)

Pakistan Women won by 42 runs
Railway Union Sports Club, Dublin
Umpires: Keith Smith (Ire) and Noel McCarey (Ire)
Player of the match: Sana Mir (Pak)

- Bangladesh Women won the toss and elected to field.
- Ritu Moni (Ban) and Elizebath Khan (Pak) both made their WODI debuts.

== Only ODI: Ireland v Bangladesh ==
21 August 2012
Scorecard

Ireland; 148/6 (45 overs)	v	Bangladesh; 94 (35.4 overs)
Isobel Joyce 43 (97); Rumana Ahmed 2/23 (8 overs)		Lata Mondal 25 (60); Louise McCarthy 4/18 (7 overs)

Ireland Women won by 61 runs (D/L)
Phoenix Cricket Club, Dublin
Umpires: Keith Smith (Ire) and Noel McCarey (Ire)

- Ireland Women won the toss and elected to bat.
- Tithy Sarkar (Ban) made her WODI debut.

== Ireland Women's ODI Tri-Series ==
2012 Ireland Women's ODI Tri-Series
- Date: 22–24 August 2012
- Location: Ireland
- Result: Pakistan won the tri-series
Teams
Ireland	Bangladesh	Pakistan
Captains
Isobel Joyce	Salma Khatun	Sana Mir
Most runs
Clare Shillington (117)	Shukhtara Rahman (38)	Nain Abidi (116)
Most wickets
Kim Garth (4)	Khadija Tul Kubra (4)	Nida Dar (4)

=== Fixtures ===
23 August 2012
Scorecard

Bangladesh; 161/8 (50 overs)	v	Pakistan; 164/6 (49.3 overs)
Shukhtara Rahman 37 (110); Nida Dar 3/36 (10 overs)		Sana Mir 29 (67); Rumana Ahmed 2/31 (10 overs)

Pakistan Women won by 4 wickets
Railway Union Sports Club, Dublin
Umpires: Dermot Ward (Ire) and Martin Block (Ire)

- Bangladesh Women won the toss and elected to bat.
- Points: Pakistan Women 2, Bangladesh Women 0
- Ayasha Rahman (Ban) made her WODI debut.

24 August 2012
Scorecard

Ireland; 145/9 (45 overs)	v	Bangladesh; 22/4 (10 overs)
Clare Shillington 51 (70); Khadija Tul Kubra 3/23 (9 overs)		Lata Mondal 8* (16); Kim Garth 4/11 (5 overs)

No result
YMCA Cricket Club, Dublin
Umpires: Alan Neill (Ire) and Dermot Ward (Ire)

- Ireland Women won the toss and elected to bat.
- No further play possible due to rain.
- Ireland Women innings reduced to 45 overs.
- Bangladesh Women target was 150 runs from 45 overs.
- Points: Ireland Women 1, Bangladesh Women 1
- Nuzhat Tasnia (Ban) made her WODI debut.

== Only T20I: Bangladesh v Pakistan ==
27 August 2012
Scorecard

Bangladesh	v	Pakistan

Match Abandoned
Castle Avenue, Dublin
Umpires: Charlie McElwee (Ire) and Dermot Ward (Ire)

- No toss.
- No play possible due to rain.

== Ireland Women's T20 Tri-Series ==
2012 Ireland Women's T20 Tri-Series
- Date: 28–29 August 2012
- Location: Ireland
- Result: Pakistan won the tri-series
Teams
Ireland	Bangladesh	Pakistan
Captains
Isobel Joyce	Salma Khatun	Sana Mir
Most runs
Clare Shillington (44)	Lata Mondal (51)	Nida Dar (74)
Most wickets
Elena Tice (3)	Salma Khatun (4)	Sana Mir (6)

=== Fixtures ===
28 August 2012
Scorecard

Ireland; 92/4 (20 overs)	v	Bangladesh; 93/6 (19.5 overs)
Clare Shillington 34 (42); Rumana Ahmed 1/10 (4 overs)		Salma Khatun 41 (53); Elena Tice 3/14 (3 overs)

Bangladesh Women won by 4 wickets
Castle Avenue, Dublin
Umpires: Charlie McElwee (Ire) and Dermot Ward (Ire)

- Ireland Women won the toss and elected to bat.
- Points: Bangladesh Women 2, Ireland Women 0
- Rumana Ahmed, Sharmin Akhter, Jahanara Alam, Fargana Hoque, Sanjida Islam, Salma Khatun, Khadija Tul Kubra, Lata Mondal, Ritu Moni, Shukhtara Rahman and Nuzhat Tasnia (Ban) all made their WT20I debuts.

29 August 2012
Scorecard

Bangladesh; 96/6 (20 overs)	v	Pakistan; 99/4 (16 overs)
Salma Khatun 23 (26); Sana Mir 3/16 (4 overs)		Nida Dar 28 (27); Salma Khatun 3/11 (4 overs)

Pakistan Women won by 6 wickets
Castle Avenue, Dublin
Umpires: Charlie McElwee (Ire) and Dermot Ward (Ire)

- Bangladesh Women won the toss and elected to bat.
- Points: Pakistan Women 2, Bangladesh Women 0

== See also ==
- 2012 Ireland Women's Tri-Series
- Pakistani women's cricket team in England and Ireland in 2012
