= 2012 Ireland women's Tri-Nation Series =

2012 Ireland Women's ODI Tri-Series
- Date: 22–24 August 2012
- Location: Ireland
- Result: Pakistan won the tri-series
Teams
Ireland	Bangladesh	Pakistan
Captains
Isobel Joyce	Salma Khatun	Sana Mir
Most runs
Clare Shillington (117)	Shukhtara Rahman (38)	Nain Abidi (116)
Most wickets
Kim Garth (4)	Khadija Tul Kubra (4)	Nida Dar (4)

The 2012 Ireland women's Tri-Series were two cricket tournaments that took place in Ireland in 2012: the Ireland women's ODI Tri-Series and the Ireland women's T20 Tri-Series. Ireland, Bangladesh and Pakistan competed in both tournaments, and they were both won by Pakistan. The series were part of Pakistan's tour of England and Ireland and Bangladesh's tour of Ireland.

== Squads ==
Ireland	Bangladesh	Pakistan
Isobel Joyce (c); Laura Cullen; Laura Delany; Emma Flanagan; Kim Garth; Cecelia Joyce; Shauna Kavanagh; Amy Kenealy; Louise McCarthy; Eimear Richardson; Melissa Scott-Hayward; Clare Shillington; Elena Tice; Mary Waldron (wk)	Salma Khatun (c); Rumana Ahmed; Sharmin Akhter; Jahanara Alam; Panna Ghosh; Fargana Hoque; Sanjida Islam; Khadija Tul Kubra; Lata Mondal; Ritu Moni; Ayasha Rahman; Shukhtara Rahman; Tithy Sarkar; Nuzhat Tasnia (wk); Sultana Yesmin (wk)	Sana Mir (c); Nain Abidi; Nida Dar; Batool Fatima (wk); Asmavia Iqbal; Marina Iqbal; Qanita Jalil; Masooma Junaid; Elizebath Khan; Nahida Khan; Javeria Khan; Bismah Maroof; Javeria Rauf; Sadia Yousuf

== ODI Tri-Series ==
=== Points table ===
Team	Pld	W	L	T	NR	Pts	NRR
Pakistan (C)	2	2	0	0	0	4	+0.530
Bangladesh	2	0	1	0	1	1	–0.093
Ireland	2	0	1	0	1	1	–1.077

Source: ESPN Cricinfo

=== Fixtures ===
==== 1st ODI ====
22 August 2012
Scorecard

Pakistan; 254/3 (50 overs)	v	Ireland; 181/8 (39 overs)
Nain Abidi 101* (129); Isobel Joyce 2/37 (10 overs)		Clare Shillington 66 (76); Sana Mir 2/35 (8 overs)

Pakistan Women won by 42 runs
YMCA Cricket Club, Dublin
Umpires: Dermot Ward (Ire) and Keith Smith (Ire)

- Pakistan Women won the toss and elected to bat.
- Points: Pakistan Women 2, Ireland Women 0

==== 2nd ODI ====
23 August 2012
Scorecard

Bangladesh; 161/8 (50 overs)	v	Pakistan; 164/6 (49.3 overs)
Shukhtara Rahman 37 (110); Nida Dar 3/36 (10 overs)		Sana Mir 29 (67); Rumana Ahmed 2/31 (10 overs)

Pakistan Women won by 4 wickets
Railway Union Sports Club, Dublin
Umpires: Dermot Ward (Ire) and Martin Block (Ire)

- Bangladesh Women won the toss and elected to bat.
- Points: Pakistan Women 2, Bangladesh Women 0
- Ayasha Rahman (Ban) made her WODI debut.

==== 3rd ODI ====
24 August 2012
Scorecard

Ireland; 145/9 (45 overs)	v	Bangladesh; 22/4 (10 overs)
Clare Shillington 51 (70); Khadija Tul Kubra 3/23 (9 overs)		Lata Mondal 8* (16); Kim Garth 4/11 (5 overs)

No result
YMCA Cricket Club, Dublin
Umpires: Alan Neill (Ire) and Dermot Ward (Ire)

- Ireland Women won the toss and elected to bat.
- No further play possible due to rain.
- Ireland Women innings reduced to 45 overs.
- Bangladesh Women target was 150 runs from 45 overs.
- Points: Ireland Women 1, Bangladesh Women 1
- Nuzhat Tasnia (Ban) made her WODI debut.

== T20 Tri-Series ==
2012 Ireland Women's T20 Tri-Series
- Date: 28–29 August 2012
- Location: Ireland
- Result: Pakistan won the tri-series
Teams
Ireland	Bangladesh	Pakistan
Captains
Isobel Joyce	Salma Khatun	Sana Mir
Most runs
Clare Shillington (44)	Lata Mondal (51)	Nida Dar (74)
Most wickets
Elena Tice (3)	Salma Khatun (4)	Sana Mir (6)

=== Points table ===
Team	Pld	W	L	T	NR	Pts	NRR
Pakistan (C)	2	2	0	0	0	4	+1.479
Bangladesh	2	1	1	0	0	2	–0.561
Ireland	2	0	2	0	0	0	–0.761

Source: ESPN Cricinfo

=== Fixtures ===
==== 1st T20I ====
28 August 2012
Scorecard

Ireland; 92/4 (20 overs)	v	Bangladesh; 93/6 (19.5 overs)
Clare Shillington 34 (42); Rumana Ahmed 1/10 (4 overs)		Salma Khatun 41 (53); Elena Tice 3/14 (3 overs)

Bangladesh Women won by 4 wickets
Castle Avenue, Dublin
Umpires: Charlie McElwee (Ire) and Dermot Ward (Ire)

- Ireland Women won the toss and elected to bat.
- Points: Bangladesh Women 2, Ireland Women 0
- Rumana Ahmed, Sharmin Akhter, Jahanara Alam, Fargana Hoque, Sanjida Islam, Salma Khatun, Khadija Tul Kubra, Lata Mondal, Ritu Moni, Shukhtara Rahman and Nuzhat Tasnia (Ban) all made their WT20I debuts.

==== 2nd T20I ====
29 August 2012
Scorecard

Ireland; 81/6 (20 overs)	v	Pakistan; 85/2 (15.1 overs)
Cecelia Joyce 29 (48); Sana Mir 3/13 (4 overs)		Nida Dar 46 (41); Kim Garth 1/16 (3.1 overs)

Pakistan Women won by 8 wickets
Castle Avenue, Dublin
Umpires: Charlie McElwee (Ire) and Dermot Ward (Ire)

- Pakistan Women won the toss and elected to field.
- Points: Pakistan Women 2, Ireland Women 0
- Elizebath Khan (Pak) made her WT20I debut.

==== 3rd T20I ====
29 August 2012
Scorecard

Bangladesh; 96/6 (20 overs)	v	Pakistan; 99/4 (16 overs)
Salma Khatun 23 (26); Sana Mir 3/16 (4 overs)		Nida Dar 28 (27); Salma Khatun 3/11 (4 overs)

Pakistan Women won by 6 wickets
Castle Avenue, Dublin
Umpires: Charlie McElwee (Ire) and Dermot Ward (Ire)

- Bangladesh Women won the toss and elected to bat.
- Points: Pakistan Women 2, Bangladesh Women 0

== See also ==
- Bangladeshi women's cricket team in Ireland in 2012
- Pakistani women's cricket team in England and Ireland in 2012
