= Pakistan women's cricket team in England and Ireland in 2012 =

Pakistan women's cricket team against Bangladesh in Ireland 2012
	Bangladesh	Pakistan
- Dates: 20 – 27 August 2012
Captains	Salma Khatun	Sana Mir

One Day International series
- Results: Pakistan won the 1-match series 1–0
Most runs	Rumana Ahmed (42)	Bismah Maroof (67)
Most wickets	3 bowlers (1)	Sadia Yousuf (4); Sana Mir (4)

Twenty20 International series
- Results: 1-match series drawn 0–0

The Pakistan women's national cricket team toured Ireland and England in August and September 2012. In Ireland, they played Bangladesh in 1 One Day International and 1 Twenty20 International, as well as playing in the two Ireland Women's Tri-Series, against Bangladesh and Ireland. They then went to England, and played England in 2 T20Is and the West Indies in 1 T20I.

== Tour of Ireland ==
=== Squads ===
Ireland	Bangladesh	Pakistan
Isobel Joyce (c); Laura Cullen; Laura Delany; Emma Flanagan; Kim Garth; Cecelia Joyce; Shauna Kavanagh; Amy Kenealy; Louise McCarthy; Eimear Richardson; Melissa Scott-Hayward; Clare Shillington; Elena Tice; Mary Waldron (wk)	Salma Khatun (c); Rumana Ahmed; Sharmin Akhter; Jahanara Alam; Panna Ghosh; Fargana Hoque; Sanjida Islam; Khadija Tul Kubra; Lata Mondal; Ritu Moni; Ayasha Rahman; Shukhtara Rahman; Tithy Sarkar; Nuzhat Tasnia (wk); Sultana Yesmin (wk)	Sana Mir (c); Nain Abidi; Nida Dar; Batool Fatima (wk); Asmavia Iqbal; Marina Iqbal; Qanita Jalil; Masooma Junaid; Elizebath Khan; Nahida Khan; Javeria Khan; Bismah Maroof; Javeria Rauf; Sadia Yousuf

=== Only ODI: Bangladesh v Pakistan ===
20 August 2012
Scorecard

Pakistan; 180/6 (50 overs)	v	Bangladesh; 138 (46.3 overs)
Bismah Maroof 67* (99); Lata Mondal 1/20 (7 overs)		Rumana Ahmed 42 (103); Sadia Yousuf 4/26 (8.3 overs)

Pakistan Women won by 42 runs
Railway Union Sports Club, Dublin
Umpires: Keith Smith (Ire) and Noel McCarey (Ire)
Player of the match: Sana Mir (Pak)

- Bangladesh Women won the toss and elected to field.
- Ritu Moni (Ban) and Elizebath Khan (Pak) both made their WODI debuts.

=== Ireland Women's ODI Tri-Series ===
2012 Ireland Women's ODI Tri-Series
- Date: 22–24 August 2012
- Location: Ireland
- Result: Pakistan won the tri-series
Teams
Ireland	Bangladesh	Pakistan
Captains
Isobel Joyce	Salma Khatun	Sana Mir
Most runs
Clare Shillington (117)	Shukhtara Rahman (38)	Nain Abidi (116)
Most wickets
Kim Garth (4)	Khadija Tul Kubra (4)	Nida Dar (4)

==== Fixtures ====
22 August 2012
Scorecard

Pakistan; 254/3 (50 overs)	v	Ireland; 181/8 (39 overs)
Nain Abidi 101* (129); Isobel Joyce 2/37 (10 overs)		Clare Shillington 66 (76); Sana Mir 2/35 (8 overs)

Pakistan Women won by 42 runs
YMCA Cricket Club, Dublin
Umpires: Dermot Ward (Ire) and Keith Smith (Ire)

- Pakistan Women won the toss and elected to bat.
- Points: Pakistan Women 2, Ireland Women 0

23 August 2012
Scorecard

Bangladesh; 161/8 (50 overs)	v	Pakistan; 164/6 (49.3 overs)
Shukhtara Rahman 37 (110); Nida Dar 3/36 (10 overs)		Sana Mir 29 (67); Rumana Ahmed 2/31 (10 overs)

Pakistan Women won by 4 wickets
Railway Union Sports Club, Dublin
Umpires: Dermot Ward (Ire) and Martin Block (Ire)

- Bangladesh Women won the toss and elected to bat.
- Points: Pakistan Women 2, Bangladesh Women 0
- Ayasha Rahman (Ban) made her WODI debut.

=== Only T20I: Bangladesh v Pakistan ===
27 August 2012
Scorecard

Bangladesh	v	Pakistan

Match Abandoned
Castle Avenue, Dublin
Umpires: Charlie McElwee (Ire) and Dermot Ward (Ire)

- No toss.
- No play possible due to rain.

=== Ireland Women's T20 Tri-Series ===
2012 Ireland Women's T20 Tri-Series
- Date: 28–29 August 2012
- Location: Ireland
- Result: Pakistan won the tri-series
Teams
Ireland	Bangladesh	Pakistan
Captains
Isobel Joyce	Salma Khatun	Sana Mir
Most runs
Clare Shillington (44)	Lata Mondal (51)	Nida Dar (74)
Most wickets
Elena Tice (3)	Salma Khatun (4)	Sana Mir (6)

==== Fixtures ====
29 August 2012
Scorecard

Ireland; 81/6 (20 overs)	v	Pakistan; 85/2 (15.1 overs)
Cecelia Joyce 29 (48); Sana Mir 3/13 (4 overs)		Nida Dar 46 (41); Kim Garth 1/16 (3.1 overs)

Pakistan Women won by 8 wickets
Castle Avenue, Dublin
Umpires: Charlie McElwee (Ire) and Dermot Ward (Ire)

- Pakistan Women won the toss and elected to field.
- Points: Pakistan Women 2, Ireland Women 0
- Elizebath Khan (Pak) made her WT20I debut.

29 August 2012
Scorecard

Bangladesh; 96/6 (20 overs)	v	Pakistan; 99/4 (16 overs)
Salma Khatun 23 (26); Sana Mir 3/16 (4 overs)		Nida Dar 28 (27); Salma Khatun 3/11 (4 overs)

Pakistan Women won by 6 wickets
Castle Avenue, Dublin
Umpires: Charlie McElwee (Ire) and Dermot Ward (Ire)

- Bangladesh Women won the toss and elected to bat.
- Points: Pakistan Women 2, Bangladesh Women 0

== Tour of England ==
Pakistani women's cricket team in England in 2012
	England	Pakistan
- Dates: 1 – 6 September 2012
Captains	Charlotte Edwards	Sana Mir

Twenty20 International series
- Results: England won the 2-match series 2–0
Most runs	Sarah Taylor (66)	Sana Mir (31)
Most wickets	Anya Shrubsole (4)	Asmavia Iqbal (4)

=== Squads ===
England	Pakistan
Charlotte Edwards (c); Tammy Beaumont; Arran Brindle; Katherine Brunt; Holly Colvin; Lydia Greenway; Jenny Gunn; Danielle Hazell; Heather Knight; Laura Marsh; Susie Rowe; Anya Shrubsole; Sarah Taylor (wk); Danni Wyatt	Sana Mir (c); Nain Abidi; Nida Dar; Batool Fatima (wk); Asmavia Iqbal; Marina Iqbal; Qanita Jalil; Masooma Junaid; Elizebath Khan; Nahida Khan; Javeria Khan; Bismah Maroof; Javeria Rauf; Sadia Yousuf

=== Tour Matches ===
==== 20-over match: England Under-19s v Pakistan ====
1 September 2012
Scorecard

Pakistan; 109/8 (20 overs)	v	England Under-19s; 74 (17.5 overs)
Nain Abidi 36 (52); Beth Langston 3/18 (4 overs)		Amy Jones 36 (26); Qanita Jalil 3/9 (4 overs)

Pakistan Women won by 35 runs
Brockington Ground, Loughborough
Umpires: Mark Benson (Eng) and Rob Bailey (Eng)

- England Under-19s Women won the toss and elected to field.

==== 20-over match: England Under-19s v Pakistan ====
1 September 2012
Scorecard

Pakistan; 105/8 (20 overs)	v	England Under-19s; 107/7 (19.5 overs)
Nain Abidi 28 (12); Fi Morris 3/12 (3 overs)		Jess Watson 26 (28); Sana Mir 3/12 (4 overs)

England Under-19s Women won by 3 wickets
Brockington Ground, Loughborough
Umpires: Brian Jones (Eng) and Russell Warren (Eng)

- England Under-19s Women won the toss and elected to field.

==== 20-over match: England Academy v Pakistan ====
4 September 2012
Scorecard

England Academy; 121 (20 overs)	v	Pakistan; 82 (18.5 overs)
Nat Sciver 40 (28); Nida Dar 4/17 (4 overs)		Nain Abidi 26 (33); Nat Sciver 2/15 (4 overs)

England Academy Women won by 39 runs
Haslegrave Ground, Loughborough
Umpires: Michael Gough (Eng) and Peter Hartley (Eng)

- England Academy Women won the toss and elected to bat.

==== 20-over match: England Academy v Pakistan ====
6 September 2012
Scorecard

Pakistan; 150/6 (20 overs)	v	England Academy; 108 (19 overs)
Qanita Jalil 55 (36); Fi Morris 2/22 (4 overs)		Amy Jones 28 (14); Sana Mir 2/3 (2 overs)

Pakistan Women won by 42 runs
Haslegrave Ground, Loughborough
Umpires: Billy Taylor (Eng) and Mark Eggleston (Eng)

- Pakistan Women won the toss and elected to bat.

=== WT20I Series ===
==== 1st T20I ====
4 September 2012
Scorecard

Pakistan; 87/7 (20 overs)	v	England; 91/3 (15.5 overs)
Nain Abidi 21 (31); Anya Shrubsole 4/12 (4 overs)		Sarah Taylor 31 (25); Qanita Jalil 2/19 (4 overs)

England Women won by 7 wickets
Haslegrave Ground, Loughborough
Umpires: Michael Gough (Eng) and Peter Hartley (Eng)
Player of the match: Anya Shrubsole (Eng)

- Pakistan Women won the toss and elected to bat.

==== 2nd T20I ====
5 September 2012
Scorecard

England; 162/7 (20 overs)	v	Pakistan; 81/5 (20 overs)
Danni Wyatt 41 (29); Asmavia Iqbal 4/36 (4 overs)		Bismah Maroof 29 (38); Laura Marsh 2/15 (4 overs)

England Women won by 81 runs
Haslegrave Ground, Loughborough
Umpires: Michael Gough (Eng) and Peter Hartley (Eng)
Player of the match: Danni Wyatt (Eng)

- England Women won the toss and elected to bat.

=== Only T20I: Pakistan v West Indies ===
5 September 2012
Scorecard

Pakistan; 98/8 (20 overs)	v	West Indies; 102/2 (19.5 overs)
Javeria Khan 37 (43); Shemaine Campbelle 3/20 (4 overs)		Kycia Knight 50* (67); Sana Mir 1/18 (4 overs)

West Indies Women won by 8 wickets
Haslegrave Ground, Loughborough
Umpires: Michael Gough (Eng) and Peter Hartley (Eng)

- Pakistan Women won the toss and elected to bat.

== See also ==
- 2012 Ireland Women's Tri-Series
- Bangladeshi women's cricket team in Ireland in 2012
- West Indies women's cricket team in England in 2012
