= Bangladesh women's cricket team in Pakistan in 2015–16 =

Bangladesh women's tour of Pakistan in 2015–16
	Pakistan women	Bangladesh women
- Dates: 30 September 2015 – 6 October 2015
Captains	Sana Mir	Salma Khatun

One Day International series
- Results: Pakistan women won the 2-match series 2–0
Most runs	Bismah Maroof (133)	Rumana Ahmed (72)
Most wickets	Anam Amin (7)	Salma Khatun (3)
- Player of the series: Bismah Maroof (Pak)

Twenty20 International series
- Results: Pakistan women won the 2-match series 2–0
Most runs	Bismah Maroof (109)	Rumana Ahmed (49)
Most wickets	Nida Dar (3)	Nahida Akter (4)
- Player of the series: Bismah Maroof (Pak)

The Bangladesh women's cricket team toured Pakistan in the first week of October 2015 to play two Twenty20 International (T20I) and two One Day Internationals (ODIs). It was the first time that Bangladesh women will play against another nation since the 2014 Asian Games, where Pakistan had become Asian champions in women's cricket by defeating Bangladesh in the final. Pakistan women won all T20I and ODI matches.

== Squads ==
Pakistan	Bangladesh
Sana Mir (c); Batool Fatima (vc); Aliya Riaz; Anam Amin; Asmavia Iqbal; Ayesha Zafar; Bismah Maroof; Diana Baig; Iram Javed; Javeria Khan; Marina Iqbal; Nida Dar; Rabiya Shah; Sania Khan; Sidra Ameen; Sumaiya Siddiqi; Kainat Imtiaz; Nahida Khan; Sadia Yousuf; Sidra Nawaz	Salma Khatun; Jahanara Alam; Farzana Hoque; Rumana Ahmed; Lata Mondal; Ayasha Rahman; Panna Ghosh; Sharmin Akhter; Fahima Khatun; Shamima Sultana; Ritu Moni; Nigar Sultana; Khadija Tul Kubra; Sharmin Sultana; Nahida Akter; Sanjida Islam; Sumona Akter

== T20I series ==
=== 1st T20I ===
30 September
10:00

Pakistan; 124/5 (20 overs)	v	Bangladesh; 95/7 (20 overs)
Bismah Maroof 65* (57); Nahida Akter 2/17 (4 overs)		Ayasha Rahman 23 (27); Anam Amin 2/17 (4 overs)

Pakistan Women won by 29 runs
Southend Club Cricket Stadium, Karachi
Umpires: Riazuddin & Rashid Riaz
Player of the match: Bismah Maroof(Pak)

- Pakistan Women won the toss and elected to bat

=== 2nd T20I ===
1 October

Pakistan; 114/6 (20 overs)	v	Bangladesh; 80/6 (20 overs)
Bismah Maroof 44* (38); Nahida Akter 2/27 (4 overs)		Rumana Ahmed 27 (33); Sumaiya Siddiqi 2/9 (4 overs)

Pakistan women won by 34 runs
Southend Club Cricket Stadium, Karachi
Umpires: Rashid Riaz and Riazuddin
Player of the match: Bismah Maroof (Pak)

- Pakistan Women, who chose to bat

== ODI series ==
=== 1st ODI ===
4 October

Pakistan; 214 (50 overs)	v	Bangladesh; 194/9 (50 overs)
Bismah Maroof 92 (128); Salma Khatun 3/31 (10 overs)		Rumana Ahmed 70 (97); Anam Amin 3/25 (10 overs)

Pakistan Women won by 20 runs
Southend Club Cricket Stadium, Karachi
Umpires: Asif Yaqoob & Zameer Haider (Pak)
Player of the match: Bismah Maroof (Pak)

- Pakistan Women, who chose to bat

=== 2nd ODI ===
6 October

Pakistan; 124/4 (38.3 overs)	v	Bangladesh; 123/9 (50 overs)
Bismah Maroof 41 (66); Nahida Akter 2/22 (8.3 overs)		Ayasha Rahman 39 (56); Anam Amin 4/7 (10 overs)

Pakistan Women won by 6 wickets.
Southend Club Cricket Stadium, Karachi
Umpires: Asif Yaqoob & Zameer Haider (Pak)
Player of the match: Anam Amin (Pak)

- Bangladesh Women, who chose to bat
- Nigar Sultana (BanWm) made her ODI debut.
