= Pakistan women's cricket team in Bangladesh in 2018–19 =

International cricket tour

	Bangladesh women	Pakistan women
- Dates: 2 – 8 October 2018
Captains	Rumana Ahmed (WODI); Salma Khatun (WT20Is)	Javeria Khan

One Day International series
- Results: Bangladesh women won the 1-match series 1–0
Most runs	Fargana Hoque (48)	Javeria Khan (29)
Most wickets	Khadija Tul Kubra (6)	Sana Mir (2)

Twenty20 International series
- Results: Pakistan women won the 4-match series 3–0
Most runs	Rumana Ahmed (45)	Javeria Khan (92)
Most wickets	Rumana Ahmed (2); Nahida Akter (2)	Anam Amin (5); Nida Dar (5)

The Pakistan women's cricket team played the Bangladesh women's cricket team in Bangladesh in October 2018. The tour consisted of four Women's Twenty20 Internationals (WT20Is) matches and one Women's One Day International (WODI) match. All the matches were played at Sheikh Kamal International Stadium, Cox's Bazar. Pakistan Women won the WT20I series 3–0, after the first match was washed out. Bangladesh Women won the sole WODI match by six wickets.

== Squads ==
WODI		WT20Is	
Bangladesh	Pakistan	Bangladesh	Pakistan
Rumana Ahmed (c); Nahida Akter; Sharmin Akhter; Jahanara Alam; Suraiya Azmin; Panna Ghosh; Fargana Hoque; Sanjida Islam; Fahima Khatun; Murshida Khatun; Salma Khatun; Khadija Tul Kubra; Lata Mondal; Ritu Moni; Ayasha Rahman; Nigar Sultana; Shamima Sultana; Sharmin Sultana	Javeria Khan (c); Muneeba Ali; Sidra Ameen; Anam Amin; Aiman Anwer; Diana Baig; Nahida Khan; Sana Mir; Sidra Nawaz (wk); Natalia Pervaiz; Nida Rashid; Aliya Riaz; Nashra Sandhu; Omaima Sohail; Ayesha Zafar	Salma Khatun (c); Rumana Ahmed; Nahida Akter; Sharmin Akhter; Jahanara Alam; Suraiya Azmin; Panna Ghosh; Fargana Hoque; Sanjida Islam; Fahima Khatun; Murshida Khatun; Khadija Tul Kubra; Lata Mondal; Ritu Moni; Ayasha Rahman; Nigar Sultana; Shamima Sultana; Sharmin Sultana	Javeria Khan (c); Muneeba Ali; Sidra Ameen; Anam Amin; Aiman Anwer; Diana Baig; Nahida Khan; Sana Mir; Sidra Nawaz (wk); Natalia Pervaiz; Nida Rashid; Aliya Riaz; Nashra Sandhu; Omaima Sohail; Ayesha Zafar

== WT20I series ==
=== 1st WT20I ===
2 October 2018
14:00
Scorecard

Bangladesh	v	Pakistan

Match abandoned
Sheikh Kamal International Stadium, Cox's Bazar
Umpires: Masudur Rahman (Ban) and Sharfuddoula (Ban)

- No toss.
- No play was possible due to a wet outfield.

=== 2nd WT20I ===
3 October 2018
14:00
Scorecard

Pakistan; 88/5 (14 overs)	v	Bangladesh; 30 (12.5 overs)
Javeria Khan 25 (18); Nahida Akter 2/19 (3 overs)		Rumana Ahmed 9 (12); Anam Amin 3/0 (3 overs)

Pakistan Women won by 58 runs
Sheikh Kamal International Stadium, Cox's Bazar
Umpires: Masudur Rahman (Ban) and Sharfuddoula (Ban)
Player of the match: Anam Amin (Pak)

- Bangladesh Women won the toss and elected to field.
- The match was reduced to 14 overs per side due to a wet outfield.
- Bangladesh Women's total was the lowest by a Full Member side in WT20Is.

=== 3rd WT20I ===
5 October 2018
09:30
Scorecard

Bangladesh; 81/8 (20 overs)	v	Pakistan; 85/3 (18.1 overs)
Nigar Sultana 19 (29); Nida Dar 2/16 (4 overs); Nashra Sandhu 2/16 (4 overs)		Nahida Khan 33 (40); Rumana Ahmed 1/10 (4 overs)

Pakistan Women won by 7 wickets
Sheikh Kamal International Stadium, Cox's Bazar
Umpires: Masudur Rahman (Ban) and Sharfuddoula (Ban)
Player of the match: Nahida Khan (Pak)

- Bangladesh Women won the toss and elected to bat.

=== 4th WT20I ===
6 October 2018
14:00
Scorecard

Bangladesh; 77 (20 overs)	v	Pakistan; 78/3 (14.5 overs)
Rumana Ahmed 24 (31); Natalia Pervaiz 3/20 (4 overs)		Javeria Khan 36 (29); Salma Khatun 1/13 (2.5 overs)

Pakistan Women won by 7 wickets
Sheikh Kamal International Stadium, Cox's Bazar
Umpires: Masudur Rahman (Ban) and Sharfuddoula (Ban)
Player of the match: Natalia Pervaiz (Pak)

- Bangladesh Women won the toss and elected to bat.

== WODI match ==
=== Only WODI ===
8 October 2018
09:30
Scorecard

Pakistan; 94 (34.5 overs)	v	Bangladesh; 95/4 (29 overs)
Javeria Khan 29 (46); Khadija Tul Kubra 6/20 (9.5 overs)		Fargana Hoque 48 (81); Sana Mir 2/20 (8 overs)

Bangladesh Women won by 6 wickets
Sheikh Kamal International Stadium, Cox's Bazar
Umpires: Masudur Rahman (Ban) and Sharfuddoula (Ban)
Player of the match: Khadija Tul Kubra (Ban)

- Pakistan Women won the toss and elected to bat.
- Omaima Sohail (Pak) made her WODI debut.
- Khadija Tul Kubra became the first bowler for Bangladesh Women to take a five-wicket haul in WODIs.
