= Zimbabwean women's cricket team in Bangladesh in 2015–16 =

Zimbabwean women's cricket team toured Bangladesh in second half of November 2015. Zimbabweans arrived Bangladesh on 15 November. Tour consists of a series of two Twenty20.

== 1st T20 ==
17 November
09:30
Scorecard

Bangladesh; 125/3 (20 overs)	v	Zimbabwe; 90/8 (20 overs)
Ayasha Rahman 50 (54); Precious Marange 0/23 (4 overs)		Sharne Mayers 29 (41); Rumana Ahmed 3/11 (4 overs)

Bangladesh Women won by 35 runs
Sheikh Kamal International Stadium, Cox's Bazar
Umpires: Akteruzzaman and Imran Parvez
Player of the match: Ayasha Rahman (Bangladesh Women)

- Zimbabwe won the toss and elected to field

== 2nd T20 ==
19 November
09:30
Scorecard

Bangladesh; 69/6 (20 Overs)	v	Zimbabwe; 70/2 (11.5 Overs)
Sharne Mayers 21 (21); Jahanara Alam 3/11 (4 Overs)		Ayasha Rahman 28 (31); Christabel Chatonzwa 1/15 (3 Overs)

Bangladesh Women won by 8 wickets with 49 balls remaining
Sheikh Kamal International Stadium, Cox's Bazar
Umpires: Akteruzzaman and Imran Parvez
Player of the match: Jahanara Alam

- Bangladesh Women won the toss and chose to field
