= West Indies women's cricket team in England in 2012 =

Cricket

	England	West Indies
- Dates: 4 – 16 September 2012
Captains	Charlotte Edwards	Merissa Aguilleira

Twenty20 International series
- Results: England won the 5-match series 4–1
Most runs	Sarah Taylor (161)	Deandra Dottin (90)
Most wickets	Holly Colvin (8)	Shemaine Campbelle (6)
- Player of the series: Sarah Taylor (Eng)

The West Indies women's national cricket team toured England in September 2012. They played against Pakistan in 1 Twenty20 International, which they won, then played against England in 5 T20Is, with the series won by England 4–1.

== Squads ==
England	West Indies
Charlotte Edwards (c); Tammy Beaumont; Arran Brindle; Katherine Brunt; Holly Colvin; Lydia Greenway; Jenny Gunn; Danielle Hazell; Amy Jones; Heather Knight; Laura Marsh; Susie Rowe (withdrawn); Anya Shrubsole; Sarah Taylor (wk); Danni Wyatt	Isobel Joyce (c); Shemaine Campbelle; Britney Cooper; Shanel Daley; Deandra Dottin; Stacy-Ann King; Kycia Knight; Anisa Mohammed; Subrina Munroe; Juliana Nero; Shaquana Quintyne; Shakera Selman; Tremayne Smartt; Stafanie Taylor

== Tour Match: England Academy v West Indies ==
4 September 2012
Scorecard

West Indies; 94 (20 overs)	v	England Academy; 95/7 (19.4 overs)
Merissa Aguilleira 22 (31); Georgia Elwiss 4/12 (4 overs)		Beth Morgan 40* (46); Anisa Mohammed 3/8 (4 overs)

England Academy Women won by 3 wickets
Brockington Ground, Loughborough
Umpires: Billy Taylor (Eng) and Mark Eggleston (Eng)

- England Academy Women won the toss and elected to field.

== Only T20I: Pakistan v West Indies ==
5 September 2012
Scorecard

Pakistan; 98/8 (20 overs)	v	West Indies; 102/2 (19.5 overs)
Javeria Khan 37 (43); Shemaine Campbelle 3/20 (4 overs)		Kycia Knight 50* (67); Sana Mir 1/18 (4 overs)

West Indies Women won by 8 wickets
Haslegrave Ground, Loughborough
Umpires: Michael Gough (Eng) and Peter Hartley (Eng)

- Pakistan Women won the toss and elected to bat.

== WT20I Series ==
=== 1st T20I ===
8 September 2012
Scorecard

West Indies; 71/8 (20 overs)	v	England; 72/2 (9.4 overs)
Merissa Aguilleira 21 (29); Holly Colvin 2/5 (4 overs)		Laura Marsh 31 (22); Anisa Mohammed 1/9 (2 overs)

England Women won by 8 wickets
Riverside Ground, Chester-le-Street
Umpires: Michael Gough (Eng) and Peter Hartley (Eng)
Player of the match: Laura Marsh (Eng)

- West Indies Women won the toss and elected to bat.

=== 2nd T20I ===
10 September 2012
Scorecard

England; 150/3 (20 overs)	v	West Indies; 122/6 (20 overs)
Sarah Taylor 53 (37); Shanel Daley 2/21 (4 overs)		Merissa Aguilleira 37 (39); Arran Brindle 2/12 (3 overs)

England Women won by 28 runs
Old Trafford Cricket Ground, Manchester
Umpires: Michael Gough (Eng) and Tim Robinson (Eng)
Player of the match: Sarah Taylor (Eng)

- West Indies Women won the toss and elected to field.

=== 3rd T20I ===
13 September 2012
Scorecard

England; 103/7 (20 overs)	v	West Indies; 93 (19.2 overs)
Sarah Taylor 27 (31); Anisa Mohammed 2/11 (3 overs)		Deandra Dottin 24 (17); Holly Colvin 3/13 (4 overs)

England Women won by 10 runs
County Ground, Northampton
Umpires: Paul Baldwin (Eng) and Peter Hartley (Eng)
Player of the match: Arran Brindle (Eng)

- England Women won the toss and elected to bat.

=== 4th T20I ===
15 September 2012
Scorecard

England; 154/3 (20 overs)	v	West Indies; 70/8 (20 overs)
Lydia Greenway 61* (45); Stafanie Taylor 2/23 (4 overs)		Stafanie Taylor 40* (56); Danielle Hazell 4/12 (4 overs)

England Women won by 84 runs
County Ground, Hove
Umpires: Graham Lloyd (Eng) and Peter Willey (Eng)
Player of the match: Lydia Greenway (Eng)

- England Women won the toss and elected to bat.

=== 5th T20I ===
16 September 2012
Scorecard

England; 139/7 (20 overs)	v	West Indies; 140/7 (20 overs)
Katherine Brunt 35 (31); Anisa Mohammed 2/23 (4 overs)		Deandra Dottin 62 (34); Danni Wyatt 2/32 (4 overs)

West Indies Women won by 3 wickets
Arundel Castle Cricket Ground, Arundel
Umpires: Graham Lloyd (Eng) and Peter Willey (Eng)
Player of the match: Deandra Dottin (WI)

- West Indies Women won the toss and elected to field.

== See also ==
- Pakistani women's cricket team in England in 2012
