= PCB Hall of Fame =

Hall of fame for Pakistani cricketers

The PCB Hall of Fame is a hall of fame that honors cricketers in Pakistan, established and maintained by the Pakistan Cricket Board.

== History ==
In April 2021, the board created the Hall following a decision made at the 62nd Board of Governors meeting. The initial inductees, who were also members of the ICC Cricket Hall of Fame, included Hanif Mohammad, Imran Khan, Javed Miandad, Wasim Akram, Waqar Younis, and Zaheer Abbas.

== Selection criteria ==
Each year, an independent panel selects two inductees, with announcements made on October 16 to mark Pakistan's inaugural 1952 Test. A criterion for induction was that players must have retired from international cricket for at least five years.

== Members of the Hall of Fame ==
=== Initial inductees ===
- Hanif Mohammad
- Imran Khan
- Javed Miandad
- Wasim Akram
- Waqar Younis
- Zaheer Abbas

=== 2021 ===
- Abdul Qadir
- Fazal Mahmood

=== 2022 ===
- Abdul Hafeez Kardar
- Younis Khan

=== 2024 ===
- Misbah Ul Haq
- Inzamam Ul Haq
- Mushtaq Mohammad
- Saeed Anwar

=== 2025 ===
- Sana Mir
- Mohammad Yousuf
