= Cricket at the 2014 Asian Games =

Asian Games event

- Venue: Yeonhui Cricket Ground
- Dates: 20 September – 3 October 2014
- Competitors: 299 from 13 nations

Cricket was one of the 36 sports at the 2014 Asian Games held in Incheon, South Korea from 20 September to 3 October 2014. Both men's and women's tournaments were held in the event. Top Asian associate members and full members of the ICC took part at the 2014 Asian Games. The matches were played under Twenty20 format.

In the men's event, Sri Lanka won the gold medal by defeating Afghanistan by 68 runs. Bangladesh won the bronze by defeating Hong Kong.

In the women's event, Pakistan won the gold medal by defeating Bangladesh by 4 runs in a rain-reduced match. Sri Lanka won the bronze medal by defeating China.

== Schedule ==
P	Preliminary round	¼	Quarterfinals	½	Semifinals	F	Finals

Event↓/Date →	20th Sat	21st Sun	22nd Mon	23rd Tue	24th Wed	25th Thu	26th Fri	27th Sat	28th Sun	29th Mon	30th Tue	1st Wed	2nd Thu	3rd Fri
Men								P	P	P	¼	¼	½	F
Women	P	P	P	¼	¼	½	F							

== Medalists ==
Event	Gold	Silver	Bronze
Men	Sri Lanka; Ashan Priyanjan; Jeevan Mendis; Kosala Kulasekara; Asela Gunaratne; Dinesh Chandimal; Shehan Jayasuriya; Dilhara Lokuhettige; Kithuruwan Vithanage; Upul Tharanga; Chaturanga de Silva; Lahiru Thirimanne; Alankara Asanka Silva; Ramith Rambukwella; Isuru Udana; Chathuranga Kumara	Afghanistan; Amir Hamza; Mohammad Nasim Baras; Mohammad Nabi; Mohammad Mujtaba; Gulbadin Naib; Fazal Rahman; Samiullah Shinwari; Qaseem Khan; Fareed Ahmad; Hamid Hassan; Mohammad Shahzad; Najeeb Tarakai; Abdullah Adil; Abdullah Mazari; Karim Sadiq	Bangladesh; Sabbir Rahman; Mashrafe Mortaza; Taskin Ahmed; Arafat Sunny; Mohammad Mithun; Shuvagata Hom; Ziaur Rahman; Tamim Iqbal; Mahmudullah; Rubel Hossain; Imrul Kayes; Shamsur Rahman; Anamul Haque; Nasir Hossain; Shakib Al Hasan
Women	Pakistan; Bismah Maroof; Sana Mir; Javeria Khan; Nida Dar; Qanita Jalil; Nain Abidi; Asmavia Iqbal; Sidra Nawaz; Kainat Imtiaz; Marina Iqbal; Sumaiya Siddiqi; Sania Khan; Aliya Riaz; Anam Amin; Sadia Yousuf	Bangladesh; Rumana Ahmed; Salma Khatun; Panna Ghosh; Shohely Akhter; Shaila Sharmin; Fahima Khatun; Sanjida Islam; Lata Mondal; Nuzhat Tasnia; Shahanaz Parvin; Jahanara Alam; Khadija Tul Kubra; Ayasha Rahman; Sharmin Akhter; Fargana Hoque	Sri Lanka; Eshani Kaushalya; Dilani Manodara; Sripali Weerakkody; Anushka Sanjeewani; Shashikala Siriwardene; Inoka Ranaweera; Chamari Athapaththu; Yashoda Mendis; Chandima Gunaratne; Nilakshi de Silva; Lasanthi Madushani; Maduri Samuddika; Inoshi Priyadharshani; Udeshika Prabodhani; Chamari Polgampola

== Medal table ==
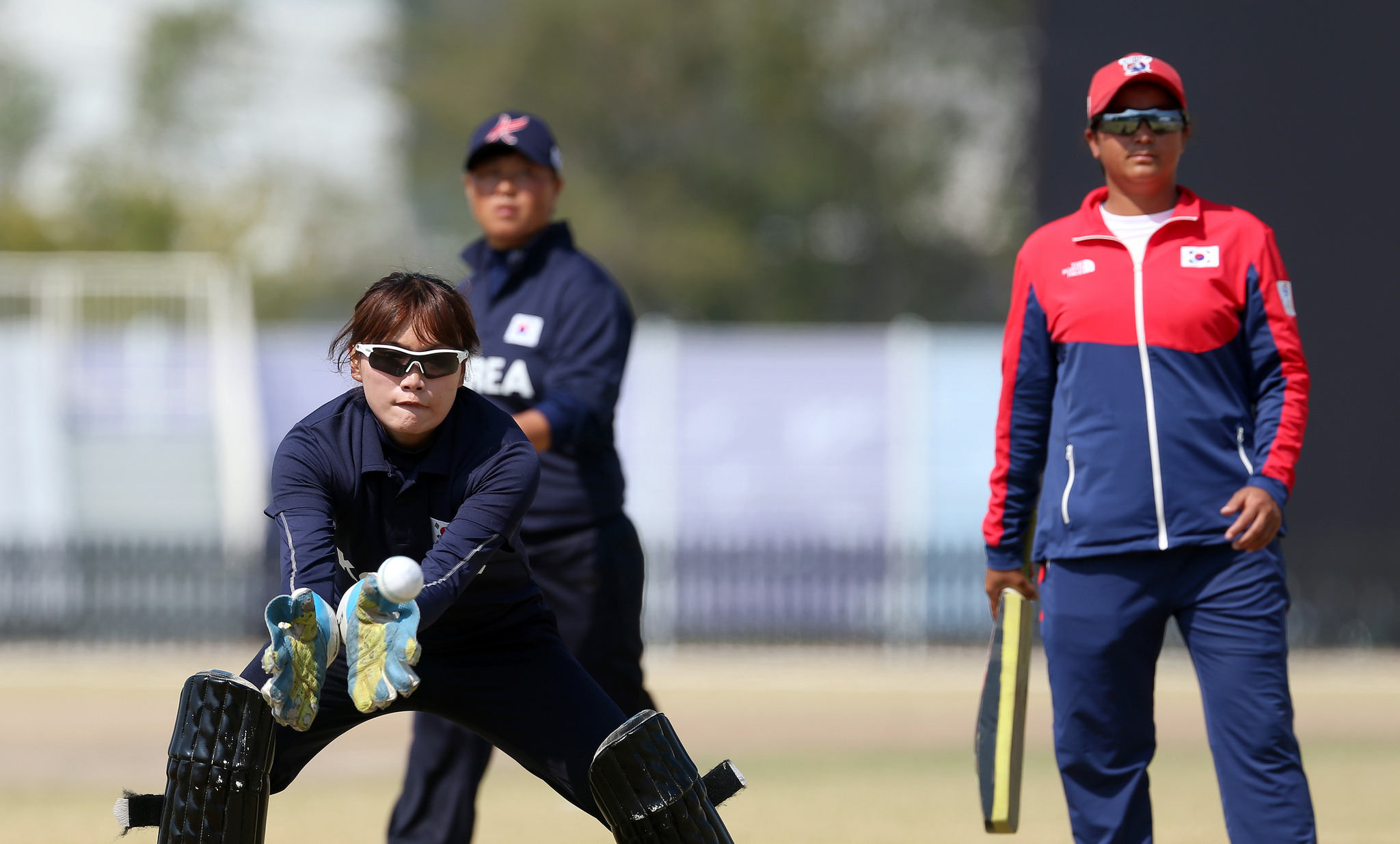
South Korea women's team against China

Rank	Nation	Gold	Silver	Bronze	Total
1	Sri Lanka (SRI)	1	0	1	2
2	Pakistan (PAK)	1	0	0	1
3	Bangladesh (BAN)	0	1	1	2
4	Afghanistan (AFG)	0	1	0	1
Totals (4 entries)		2	2	2	6

== Draw ==
=== Men ===
The two Test teams (Bangladesh and Sri Lanka) and two ODI teams (Afghanistan and Hong Kong) were seeded and went directly to the knock-out stage.

Group A

- Malaysia
- China
- South Korea

Group B

- Nepal
- Maldives
- Kuwait

Quarterfinals

- Bangladesh vs. 2nd Group B
- Sri Lanka vs. 2nd Group A
- Afghanistan vs. 1st Group B
- Hong Kong vs. 1st Group A

=== Women ===
The two Test teams (Pakistan and Sri Lanka), an ODI team Bangladesh, and Japan (who won the bronze medal in the 2010 Asian Games) were seeded and went directly to the knock-out stage.

Group C

- Thailand*
- Hong Kong
- South Korea

Group D

- China*
- Nepal
- Malaysia

Quarterfinals

- Bangladesh vs. 2nd Group D
- Sri Lanka vs. 2nd Group C
- Pakistan vs. 1st Group D
- Japan vs. 1st Group C

* China replaced Thailand in Group C.

== Final standing ==
=== Men ===
Rank	Team	Pld	W	L	T	NR
1st place, gold medalist(s)	Sri Lanka	3	2	0	0	1
2nd place, silver medalist(s)	Afghanistan	3	2	1	0	0
3rd place, bronze medalist(s)	Bangladesh	3	2	0	0	1
4	Hong Kong	3	1	2	0	0
5	Kuwait	3	0	2	0	1
5	Malaysia	3	2	1	0	0
5	Nepal	3	2	1	0	0
5	South Korea	3	1	2	0	0
9	China	2	0	2	0	0
9	Maldives	2	0	1	0	1

=== Women ===
Rank	Team	Pld	W	L	T	NR
1st place, gold medalist(s)	Pakistan	3	3	0	0	0
2nd place, silver medalist(s)	Bangladesh	3	2	1	0	0
3rd place, bronze medalist(s)	Sri Lanka	3	2	1	0	0
4	China	5	3	2	0	0
5	Hong Kong	3	1	2	0	0
5	Japan	1	0	1	0	0
5	Nepal	3	1	2	0	0
5	Thailand	3	2	1	0	0
9	Malaysia	2	0	2	0	0
9	South Korea	2	0	2	0	0
