= Nuzhat Tasnia =

Bangladeshi cricketer (born 1996)

Personal information
- Full name: Nuzhat Tasnia
- Born: 31 December 1996 (age 29); Gaibandha, Bangladesh
- Batting: Right-handed
- Role: Wicket-keeper

International information
- National side: Bangladesh
- ODI debut (cap 15): 24 August 2012 v Ireland
- Last ODI: 15 November 2021 v Zimbabwe
- T20I debut (cap 5): 28 August 2012 v Ireland
- Last T20I: 30 March 2014 v India

Domestic team information
- Years: Team
- 2009/10: Chittagong Division
- 2010/11: Sylhet Division
- 2012/13–2017: Rangpur Division

Career statistics
Competition	WODI	WT20I
Matches	12	18
Runs scored	63	45
Batting average	9.00	7.50
100s/50s	0/0	0/0
Top score	26	11
Catches/stumpings	8/4	3/15
Medal record
Representing Bangladesh
Women's Cricket
Asian Games
Silver medal – second place	2014 Incheon	Team
- Source: Cricinfo, 13 April 2022

Nuzhat Tasnia (Bengali: নুজাত তাসনিয়া; born 31 December 1996) is a Bangladeshi cricketer who plays as a wicket-keeper. In November 2021, she was named in Bangladesh's team for the 2021 Women's Cricket World Cup Qualifier tournament in Zimbabwe. In January 2022, she was named as one of three reserve players in Bangladesh's team for the 2022 Commonwealth Games Cricket Qualifier tournament in Malaysia. The following month, she was selected as one of two reserve players in Bangladesh's team for the 2022 Women's Cricket World Cup held in March and April in New Zealand.
