= Khadija Tul Kubra =

Bangladeshi cricketer

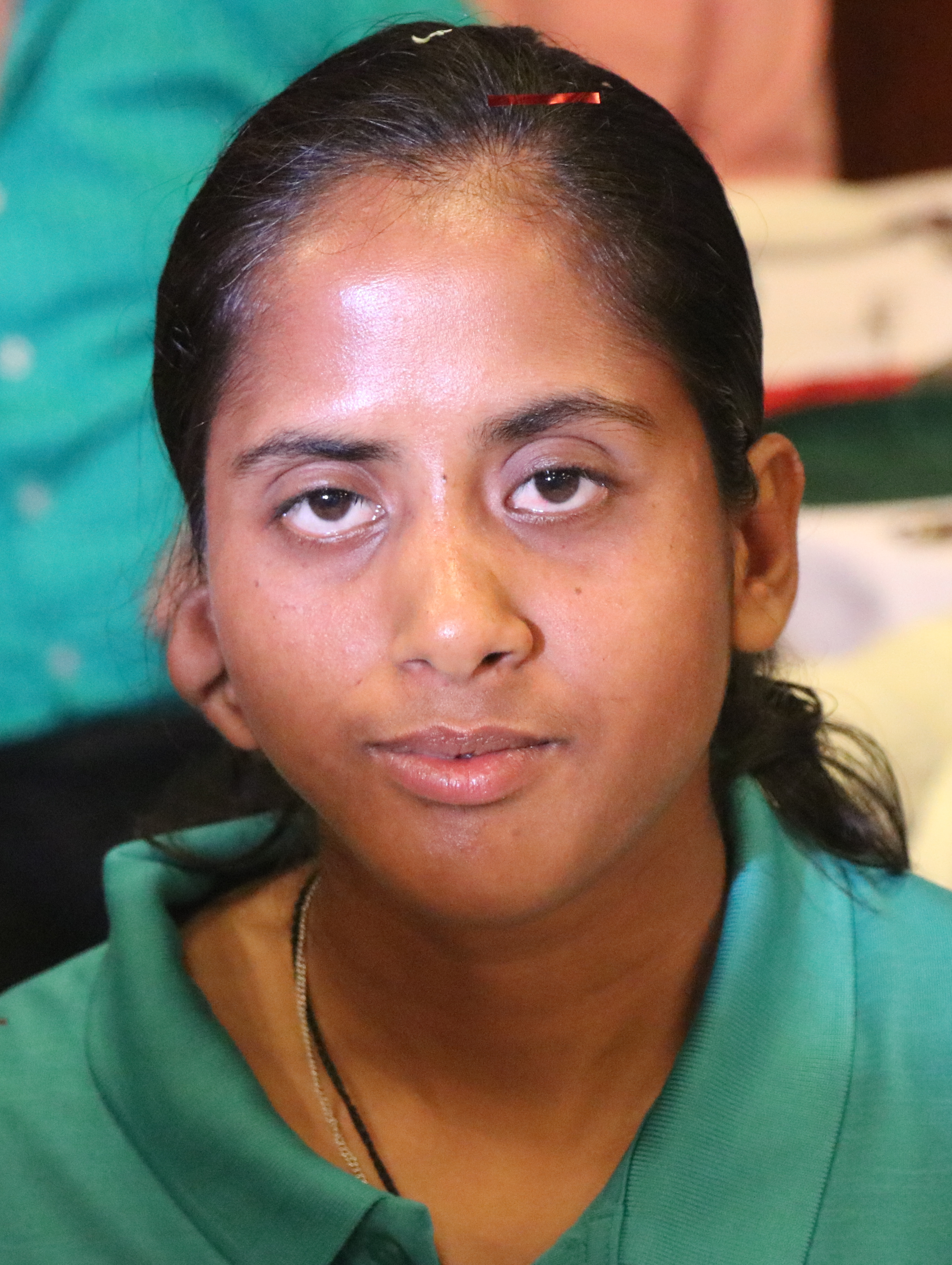
- Khadija Tul Kubra in 2018

Personal information
- Full name: Khadija Tul Kubra
- Born: 30 January 1995 (age 31); Bogra, Bangladesh
- Batting: Right-handed
- Bowling: Right-arm off break
- Role: Bowler

International information
- National side: Bangladesh (2011–present)
- ODI debut (cap 3): 26 November 2011 v Ireland
- Last ODI: 15 November 2021 v Zimbabwe
- T20I debut (cap 3): 28 August 2012 v Ireland
- Last T20I: 27 February 2020 v Australia

Domestic team information
- Years: Team
- 2010/11–2017/18: Rajshahi Division

Career statistics
| Competition | ODI | T20I |
|---|---|---|
| Matches | 31 | 49 |
| Runs scored | 44 | 19 |
| Batting average | 5.50 | 3.16 |
| 100s/50s | 0/0 | 0/0 |
| Top score | 7 | 5 |
| Balls bowled | 1,447 | 902 |
| Wickets | 42 | 43 |
| Bowling average | 19.52 | 18.46 |
| 5 wickets in innings | 1 | 0 |
| 10 wickets in match | 0 | 0 |
| Best bowling | 6/20 | 3/5 |
| Catches/stumpings | 8/– | 6/– |
Medal record
Representing Bangladesh
Women's Cricket
Asian Games
| Silver medal – second place | 2014 Incheon | Team |
South Asian Games
| Gold medal – first place | 2019 Kathmandu/Pokhara | Team |
Women's Asia Cup
| Winner | 2018 Malaysia |
- Source: ESPNcricinfo, 15 April 2022

Khadija Tul Kubra (Bengali: খাদিজা তুল কুবরা) (born 30 January 1995) is a Bangladeshi cricketer who plays for the Bangladesh cricket team. She plays as a right-handed batter and a right-arm off break bowler. In October 2018, against Pakistan Women, she became the first Bangladesh player to take a five-wicket haul in WODIs.

== Early life and background ==
Khadija was born on 30 January 1995, in Bogra, Bangladesh.

== Career ==
Khadija made her ODI debut against Ireland on 26 November 2011. Khadija also made her T20I debut against Ireland, on 28 August 2012.

She made a comeback in Bangladesh colours in 2018, after a gap of 5 years. In June 2018, she was part of Bangladesh's squad that won their first ever Women's Asia Cup title, winning the 2018 Women's Twenty20 Asia Cup tournament. Later the same month, she was named in Bangladesh's squad for the 2018 ICC Women's World Twenty20 Qualifier tournament.

In October 2018, she was named in Bangladesh's squad for the 2018 ICC Women's World Twenty20 tournament in the West Indies. Ahead of the tournament, she was named as the player to watch in the team.

In August 2019, she was named in Bangladesh's squad for the 2019 ICC Women's World Twenty20 Qualifier tournament in Scotland. In November 2019, she was named in Bangladesh's squad for the cricket tournament at the 2019 South Asian Games. The Bangladesh team beat Sri Lanka by two runs in the final to win the gold medal. In January 2020, she was named in Bangladesh's squad for the 2020 ICC Women's T20 World Cup in Australia.

In November 2021, she was named in Bangladesh's team for the 2021 Women's Cricket World Cup Qualifier tournament in Zimbabwe, and in January 2022, as one of three reserve players in Bangladesh's team for the 2022 Commonwealth Games Cricket Qualifier tournament in Malaysia.
