= Sanjida Islam =

Bangladeshi cricketer

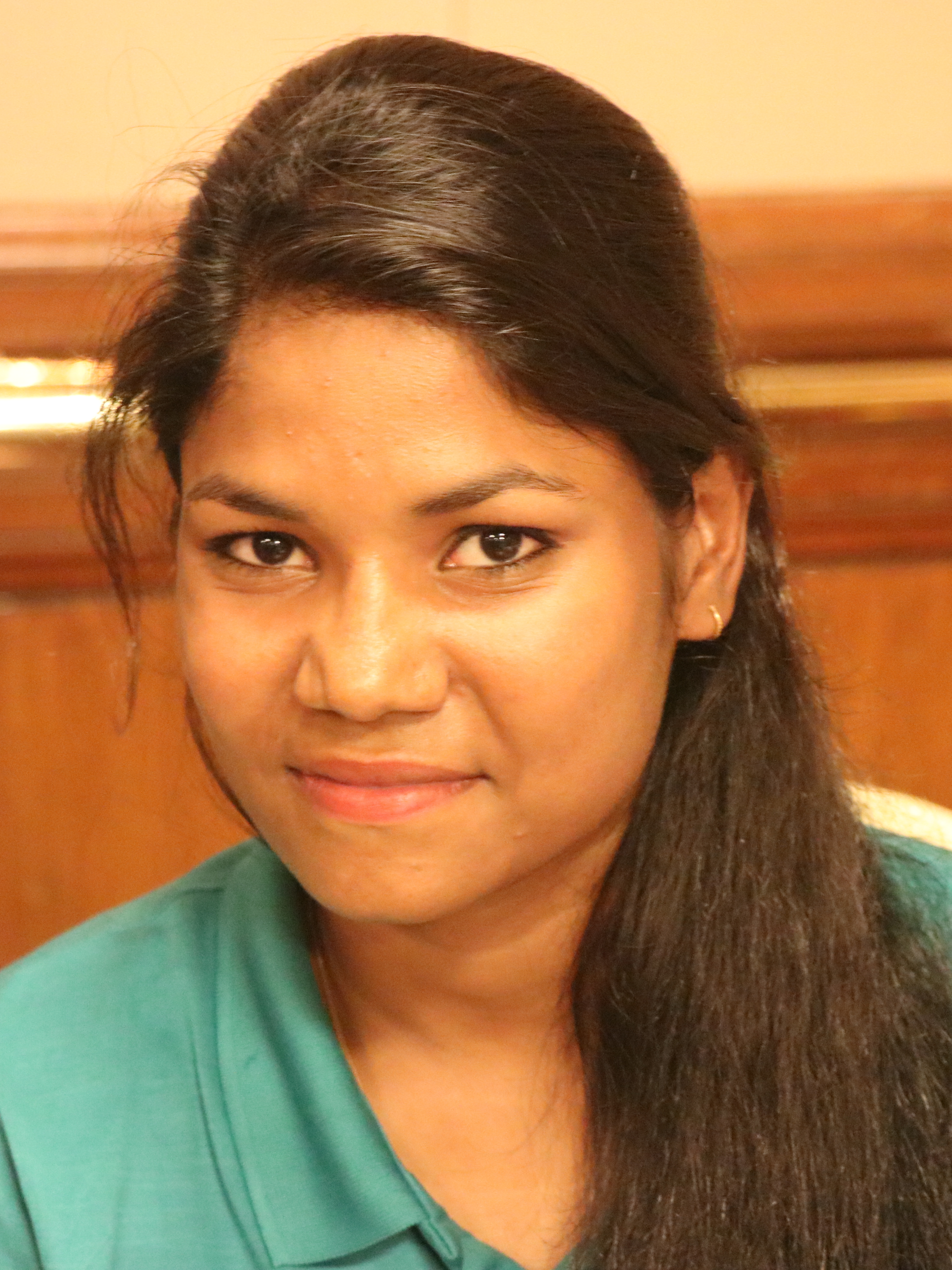
- Sanjida Islam in 2018

Personal information
- Full name: Sanjida Islam Moyna
- Born: 1 April 1996 (age 30); Rangpur, Bangladesh
- Nickname: Misty
- Batting: Right-handed
- Role: Batter
- Relatives: Mim Mosaddeak (husband)

International information
- National side: Bangladesh (2014–present)
- ODI debut (cap 21): 6 March 2014 v Pakistan
- Last ODI: 4 November 2019 v Pakistan
- T20I debut (cap 9): 28 August 2012 v Ireland
- Last T20I: 2 March 2020 v Sri Lanka

Domestic team information
- Years: Team
- 2008/09–2009/10: Chittagong Division
- 2010/11: Dhaka Division
- 2012/13–2017: Rangpur Division
- 2021/22–present: Eastern Zone

Career statistics
Competition	WODI	WT20I
Matches	16	54
Runs scored	174	520
Batting average	11.60	11.30
100s/50s	0/0	0/1
Top score	35	71*
Balls bowled	6	–
Wickets	0	–
Bowling average	–	–
5 wickets in innings	0	–
10 wickets in match	0	–
Best bowling	–	–
Catches/stumpings	5/–	8/–
Medal record
Representing Bangladesh
Women's Cricket
Asian Games
Silver medal – second place	2014 Incheon	Team
South Asian Games
Gold medal – first place	2019 Kathmandu/Pokhara	Team
Women's Asia Cup
Winner	2018 Malaysia
- Source: ESPN Cricinfo, 11 April 2022

Sanjida Islam (Bengali: সানজিদা ইসলাম) (born 1 April 1996) is a Former Bangladeshi cricketer who plays for the Bangladesh women's national cricket team. She is a right-handed batter. Sanjida was born in Rangpur, Bangladesh. She retired from cricket in 2024

== Personal life ==
On 21 October 2020, she married Bangladeshi first class cricketer Mim Mosaddeak, who plays for Rangpur Division. She gave birth in 2025. After that, she has stepped away from the game to raise her child.

== Career ==
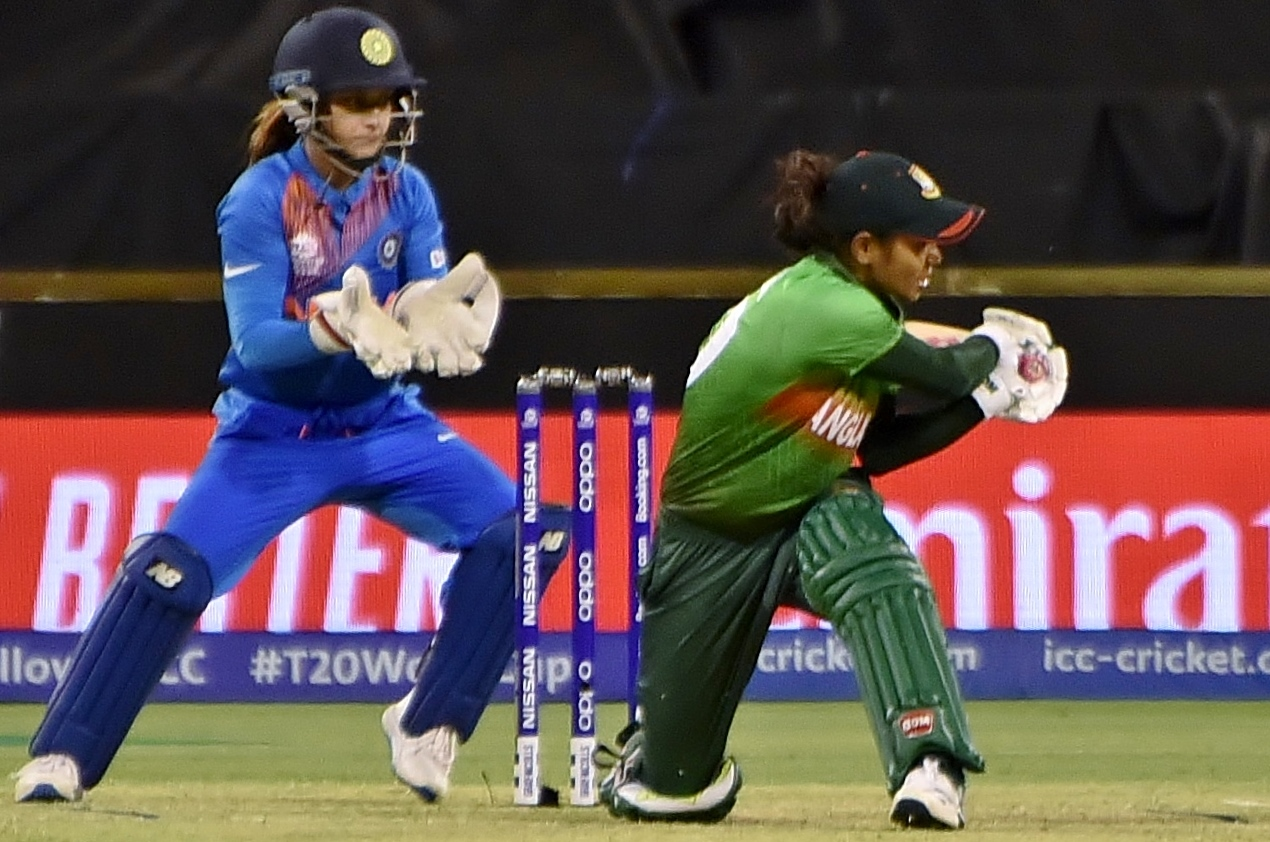
Sanjida batting for Bangladesh during the 2020 ICC Women's T20 World Cup

Sanjida made her T20I career against Ireland women's cricket team on August 28, 2012. In June 2018, she was part of Bangladesh's squad that won their first ever Women's Asia Cup title, winning the 2018 Women's Twenty20 Asia Cup tournament. Later the same month, she was named in Bangladesh's squad for the 2018 ICC Women's World Twenty20 Qualifier tournament.

In October 2018, she was named in Bangladesh's squad for the 2018 ICC Women's World Twenty20 tournament in the West Indies. In August 2019, she was named in Bangladesh's squad for the 2019 ICC Women's World Twenty20 Qualifier tournament in Scotland. She was the leading run-scorer for Bangladesh in the tournament, with 156 runs in five matches. In November 2019, she was named in Bangladesh's squad for the cricket tournament at the 2019 South Asian Games. The Bangladesh team beat Sri Lanka by two runs in the final to win the gold medal. In January 2020, she was named in Bangladesh's squad for the 2020 ICC Women's T20 World Cup in Australia.

Sanjida was dropped from the team after 2020 due to poor performance. Later, she got married and continued playing domestically until 2024 and gave birth in 2025. She has since stepped away from the game to raise her child.
