= Batool Fatima =

Pakistani cricketer (born 1982)

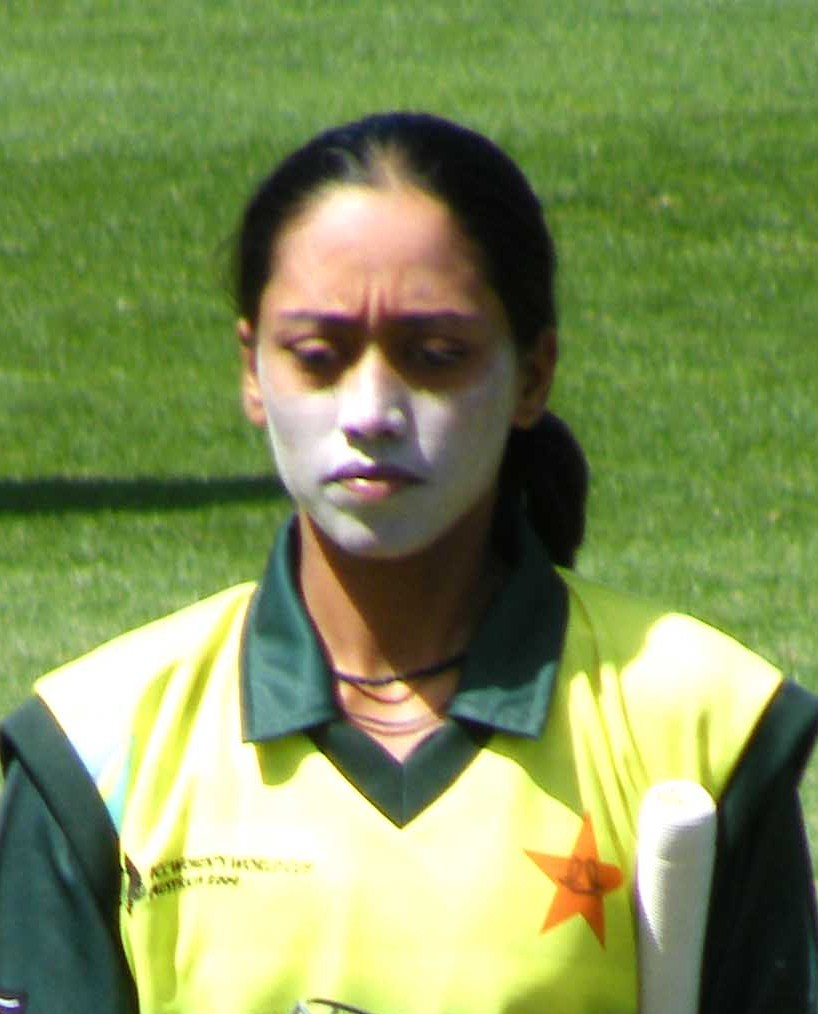

Personal information
- Full name: Syeda Batool Fatima Naqvi
- Born: 14 August 1982 (age 44); Karachi, Pakistan
- Batting: Right-handed
- Bowling: Right-arm medium
- Role: Wicket-keeper

International information
- National side: Pakistan (2001–2014)
- Only Test (cap 18): 15 March 2004 v West Indies
- ODI debut (cap 27): 9 April 2001 v Netherlands
- Last ODI: 6 March 2014 v Bangladesh
- T20I debut (cap 3): 25 May 2009 v Ireland
- Last T20I: 3 April 2014 v Sri Lanka

Domestic team information
- Years: Team
- 2005/06–2007/08: Karachi
- 2009/10–2012/13: Zarai Taraqiati Bank Limited

Career statistics
Competition	WTest	WODI	WT20I	WLA
Matches	1	83	45	128
Runs scored	0	483	64	874
Batting average	0.00	8.62	5.81	11.97
100s/50s	0/0	0/0	0/0	0/3
Top score	0	36	11*	57
Balls bowled	–	90	–	90
Wickets	–	1	–	1
Bowling average	–	61.00	–	61.00
5 wickets in innings	–	0	–	0
10 wickets in match	–	0	–	0
Best bowling	–	1/33	–	1/33
Catches/stumpings	3/2	54/46	11/39	72/68
Medal record
Representing Pakistan
Women's Cricket
Asian Games
Gold medal – first place	2010 Guangzhou	Team
- Source: CricketArchive, 10 December 2021

Syeda Batool Fatima Naqvi (born 14 August 1982) is a Pakistani former cricketer who played as a wicket-keeper and right-handed batter. She appeared in one Test match, 83 One Day Internationals and 45 Twenty20 Internationals for Pakistan between 2001 and 2014. She played domestic cricket for Karachi and Zarai Taraqiati Bank Limited.

== Career ==
She made her international debut in 2001, in a One Day International against the Netherlands at Karachi.

She made her Test debut on 15 March 2004, playing her only Test against the visiting West Indies at Karachi.

In 2010, she was part of the Pakistan side that won the cricket gold at the 2010 Asian Games, in China.

She retired from international cricket following the 2014 Women's World T20.
