= Panna Ghosh =

Bangladeshi cricketer

- Panna Ghosh in 2018

Personal information
- Full name: Panna Ghosh
- Born: 11 November 1989 (age 37); Rajshahi, Bangladesh
- Batting: Right-handed
- Bowling: Right-arm medium
- Role: Bowler

International information
- National side: Bangladesh (2011–2020)
- ODI debut (cap 5): 26 November 2011 v Ireland
- Last ODI: 4 November 2019 v Pakistan
- T20I debut (cap 15): 28 October 2012 v Sri Lanka
- Last T20I: 2 March 2020 v Sri Lanka

Domestic team information
- Years: Team
- 2008/09–2010/11: Rajshahi Division
- 2012/13: Dhaka Division
- 2017–2017/18: Rajshahi Division
- 2021/22–present: Western Zone

Career statistics
Competition	WODI	WT20I
Matches	28	40
Runs scored	133	92
Batting average	8.86	10.22
100s/50s	0/0	0/0
Top score	23	14*
Balls bowled	954	657
Wickets	15	33
Bowling average	43.00	17.69
5 wickets in innings	0	1
10 wickets in match	0	0
Best bowling	2/9	5/16
Catches/stumpings	5/–	6/–
Medal record
Representing Bangladesh
Women's Cricket
Asian Games
Silver medal – second place	2010 Guangzhou	Team
Silver medal – second place	2014 Incheon	Team
- Source: ESPN Cricinfo, 15 April 2022

Panna Ghosh (Bengali: পান্না ঘোষ) (born 11 November 1989) is a Bangladeshi cricketer who played for the Bangladesh women's national cricket team between 2011 and 2020. She plays as a right-arm medium bowler and right-handed batter.

== Early life and background ==
Ghosh was born on 11 November 1989 in Rajshahi, Bangladesh.

== Career ==
=== ODI career ===
Ghosh made her ODI debut against Ireland on 26 November 2011.

=== T20I career ===
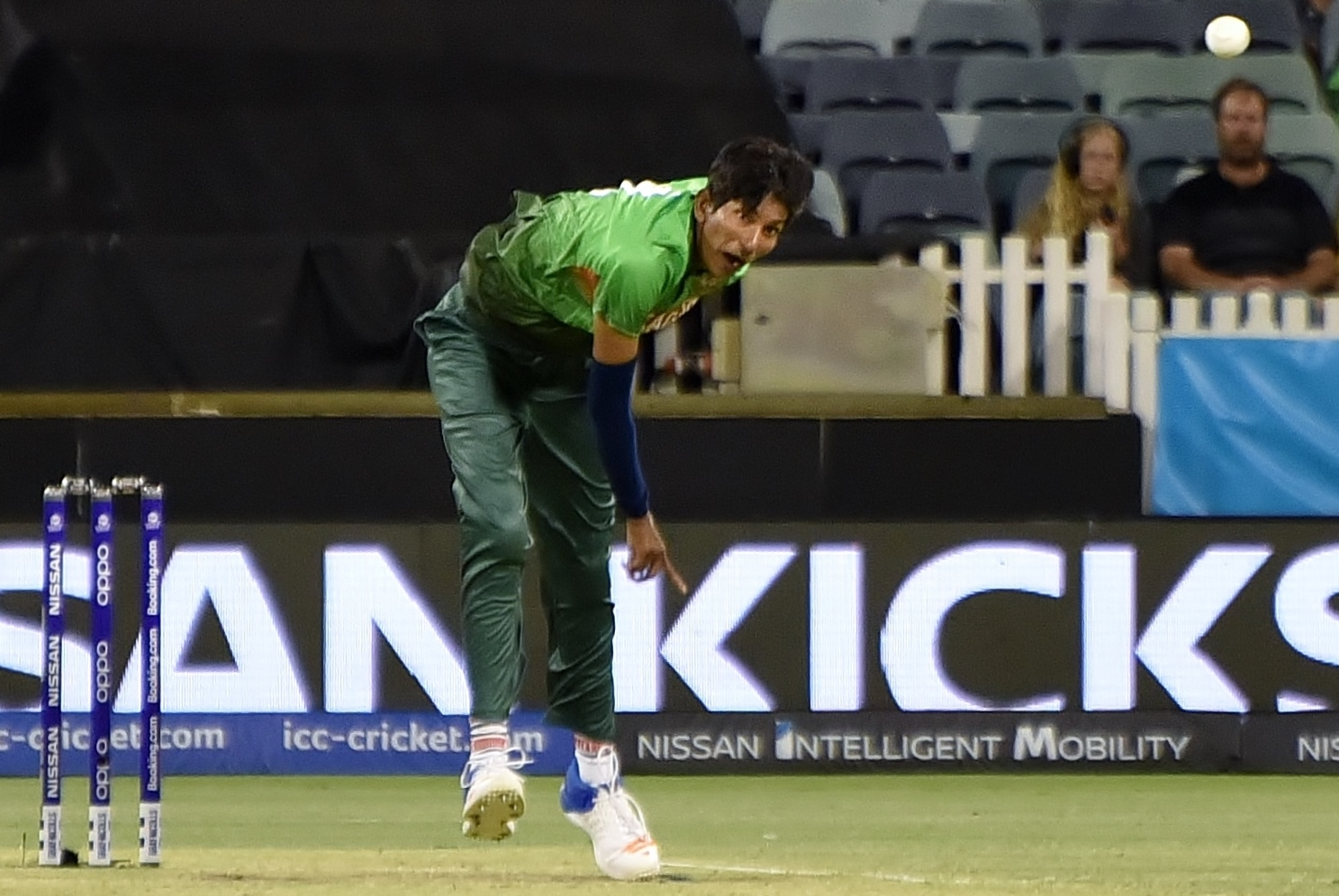
Panna bowling for Bangladesh during the 2020 ICC Women's T20 World Cup

Panna made her T20I debut against Sri Lanka on 28 October 2012. In June 2018, she was part of Bangladesh's squad that won their first ever Women's Asia Cup title, winning the 2018 Women's Twenty20 Asia Cup tournament. Later the same month, she was named in Bangladesh's squad for the 2018 ICC Women's World Twenty20 Qualifier tournament.

In October 2018, she was named in Bangladesh's squad for the 2018 ICC Women's World Twenty20 tournament in the West Indies. In January 2020, she was named in Bangladesh's squad for the 2020 ICC Women's T20 World Cup in Australia.

=== Asian Games ===
Panna was a member of the team that won a silver medal in the cricket event, against the China national women's cricket team at the 2010 Asian Games in Guangzhou, China.
