= Lata Mondal =

Bangladeshi cricketer

Personal information
- Full name: Lata Mondal
- Born: 16 January 1993 (age 33); Dhaka, Bangladesh
- Batting: Right-handed
- Bowling: Right-arm medium
- Role: All-rounder

International information
- National side: Bangladesh
- ODI debut (cap 4): 26 November 2011 v Ireland
- Last ODI: 21 December 2022 v South Africa
- T20I debut (cap 4): 28 August 2012 v Ireland
- Last T20I: 12 February 2022 v Sri Lanka

Domestic team information
- Years: Team
- 2008/09–2010/11: Rajshahi Division
- 2011/12: Dhaka Division
- 2012/13: Rangpur Division
- 2017–2017/18: Rajshahi Division
- 2021/22–present: Eastern Zone

Career statistics
Competition	WODI	WT20I
Matches	30	45
Runs scored	454	312
Batting average	17.46	10.06
100s/50s	0/1	0/0
Top score	52	32
Balls bowled	589	246
Wickets	14	5
Bowling average	28.07	60.40
5 wickets in innings	0	0
10 wickets in match	0	0
Best bowling	4/35	1/12
Catches/stumpings	10/–	22/–
Medal record
Representing Bangladesh
Women's Cricket
Asian Games
Silver medal – second place	2010 Guangzhou	Team
Silver medal – second place	2014 Incheon	Team
Bronze medal – third place	2022 Hangzhou	Team
- Source: ESPN Cricinfo, 21 February 2023

Lata Mondal (Bengali: লতা মণ্ডল; born 16 January 1993) is a Bangladeshi cricketer who plays for the Bangladesh national women's cricket team. She is an all-rounder, playing as a right-handed batter and right-arm medium bowler.

== Early life and background ==
Mondal was born on 16 January 1993 in Dhaka, Bangladesh.

== Career ==
Mondal was a member of the team that won a silver medal in the cricket event against the China national women's cricket team at the 2010 Asian Games in Guangzhou, China.

Mondal made her ODI debut against Ireland on 26 November 2011.

Mondal made her T20I debut against Ireland on 28 August 2012. In October 2018, she was named in Bangladesh's squad for the 2018 ICC Women's World Twenty20 tournament in the West Indies.

In November 2021, she was named in Bangladesh's team for the 2021 Women's Cricket World Cup Qualifier tournament in Zimbabwe. In January 2022, she was named in Bangladesh's team for the 2022 Commonwealth Games Cricket Qualifier tournament in Malaysia. Later the same month, she was named in Bangladesh's team for the 2022 Women's Cricket World Cup in New Zealand.
