= Sharmin Akhter =

Bangladeshi cricketer

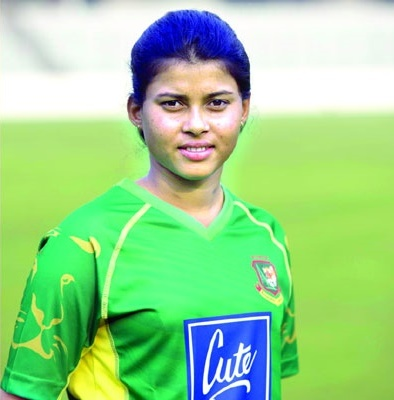
- Sharmin Akhter in 2016

Personal information
- Full name: Sharmin Akhter Supta
- Born: 31 December 1995 (age 30); Gaibanda, Bangladesh
- Batting: Right-handed
- Role: Batter

International information
- National side: Bangladesh (2011–present)
- ODI debut (cap 8): 26 November 2011 v Ireland
- Last ODI: 27 November 2024 v Ireland
- ODI shirt no.: 14
- T20I debut (cap 10): 28 August 2012 v Ireland
- Last T20I: 7 December 2022 v New Zealand

Domestic team information
- Years: Team
- 2009/10–2010/11: Dhaka Division
- 2012/13: Rangpur Division
- 2017: Dhaka Division
- 2017/18: Rangpur Division
- 2021/22–present: Northern Zone
- 2022: Trailblazers

Career statistics
Competition	ODI	T20I
Matches	32	16
Runs scored	544	151
Batting average	17.54	10.78
100s/50s	0/3	0/0
Top score	74	35
Catches/stumpings	4/–	1/–
Medal record
Representing Bangladesh
Women's Cricket
Asian Games
Silver medal – second place	2014 Incheon	Team
- Source: ESPNcricinfo, 13 February 2023

Sharmin Akhter Supta (Bengali: শারমিন আক্তার সুপ্তা) (born 31 December 1995) is a Bangladeshi cricketer who plays for the Bangladesh women's national cricket team. She plays as a right-handed batter.

== Early life ==
Sharmin was born in Gaibanda, Bangladesh.

== Career ==
Sharmin made her ODI and T20I debut against Ireland on 26 November 2011 and 28 August 2012, respectively.

In October 2018, she was named in Bangladesh's squad for the 2018 ICC Women's World Twenty20 tournament in the West Indies. In November 2021, she was named in Bangladesh's team for the 2021 Women's Cricket World Cup Qualifier tournament in Zimbabwe.

In the second match of the World Cup qualifiers against the United States, Sharmin scored an unbeaten 130 runs from 141 deliveries to take Bangladesh to 322–5 at the end of 50 overs. She hit 11 boundaries in the innings and she became the first ever centurion in ODIs for the Bangladesh Women's cricket team. She achieved this milestone by playing her 26th match. The previous highest individual innings in ODI cricket was 75 runs.

In January 2022, she was named in Bangladesh's team for the 2022 Commonwealth Games Cricket Qualifier tournament in Malaysia. Later the same month, she was named in Bangladesh's team for the 2022 Women's Cricket World Cup in New Zealand.

Akhter was part of the Bangladesh squad for the 2025 Women's Cricket World Cup Qualifier in Pakistan in April 2025.
