= Salma Khatun =

Bangladeshi cricketer

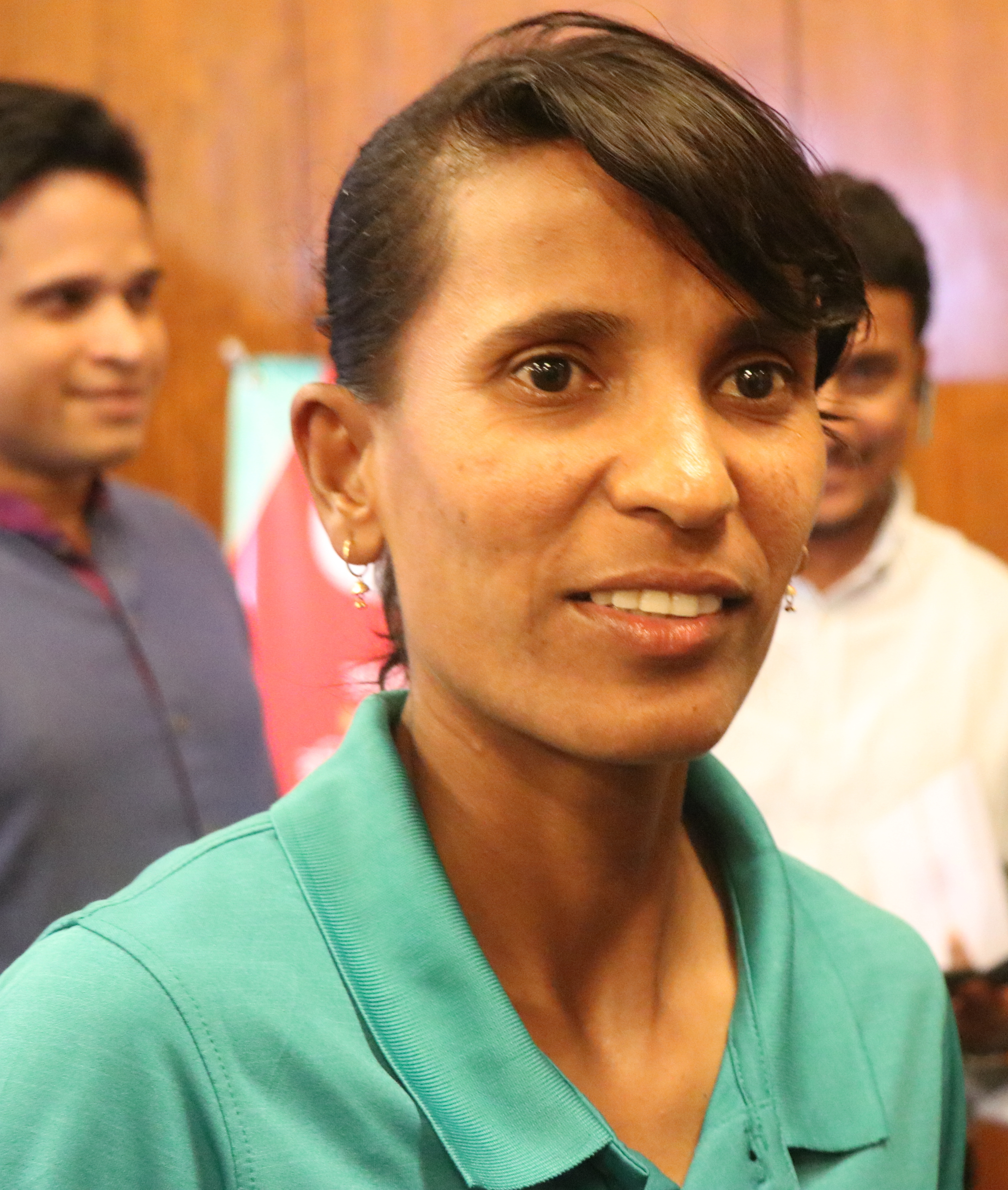
- Khatun in 2018

Personal information
- Born: 1 October 1990 (age 36); Khulna, Bangladesh
- Height: 5 ft 5 in (1.65 m)
- Batting: Right-handed
- Bowling: Right-arm off break
- Role: All-rounder

International information
- National side: Bangladesh (2011–present)
- ODI debut (cap 7): 26 November 2011 v Ireland
- Last ODI: 17 December 2022 v New Zealand
- T20I debut (cap 8): 28 August 2012 v Ireland
- Last T20I: 17 February 2023 v New Zealand

Domestic team information
- Years: Team
- 2008/09–2012/13: Khulna Division
- 2017–2017/18: Dhaka Division
- 2020–present: Trailblazers
- 2021/22–present: Southern Zone

Career statistics
Competition	WODI	WT20I
Matches	44	91
Runs scored	491	624
Batting average	14.44	15.21
100s/50s	0/1	0/0
Top score	75*	49*
Balls bowled	1,939	1,784
Wickets	51	84
Bowling average	22.60	17.13
5 wickets in innings	0	0
10 wickets in match	0	0
Best bowling	3/6	4/6
Catches/stumpings	11/–	18/–
Medal record
Representing Bangladesh
Women's Cricket
Asian Games
Silver medal – second place	2010 Guangzhou	Team
Silver medal – second place	2014 Incheon	Team
South Asian Games
Gold medal – first place	2019 Kathmandu/Pokhara	Team
Women's Asia Cup
Winner	2018 Malaysia
- Source: ESPNcricinfo, 12 February 2023

Salma Khatun (Bengali: সালমা খাতুন; born 1 October 1990) is a Bangladeshi cricketer who plays for the Bangladesh cricket team. She plays as a right-handed batter and right-arm off break bowler. She was the captain of Bangladesh between 2008 and 2020, captaining the side in their first One Day International and Twenty20 International.

== Early life and background ==
Salma Khatun was born on 1 October 1990 in Khulna, Bangladesh. As a child she played cricket with her cousins, uncle and children from the neighbourhood. She was spotted by Sheikh Salahuddin at a practice session for an inter-district tournament held prior to the formation of the Bangladesh women's team. Her performance in the competition led to her selection for Bangladesh when they first competed at the 2007 Asian Cricket Council Women's Tournament.

== Career ==
Bangladesh women's team won a historic silver medal in the Asian Games Women cricket competition in 2010 against China national women's cricket team. She was part of the team at the Asian Games in Guangzhou, China.

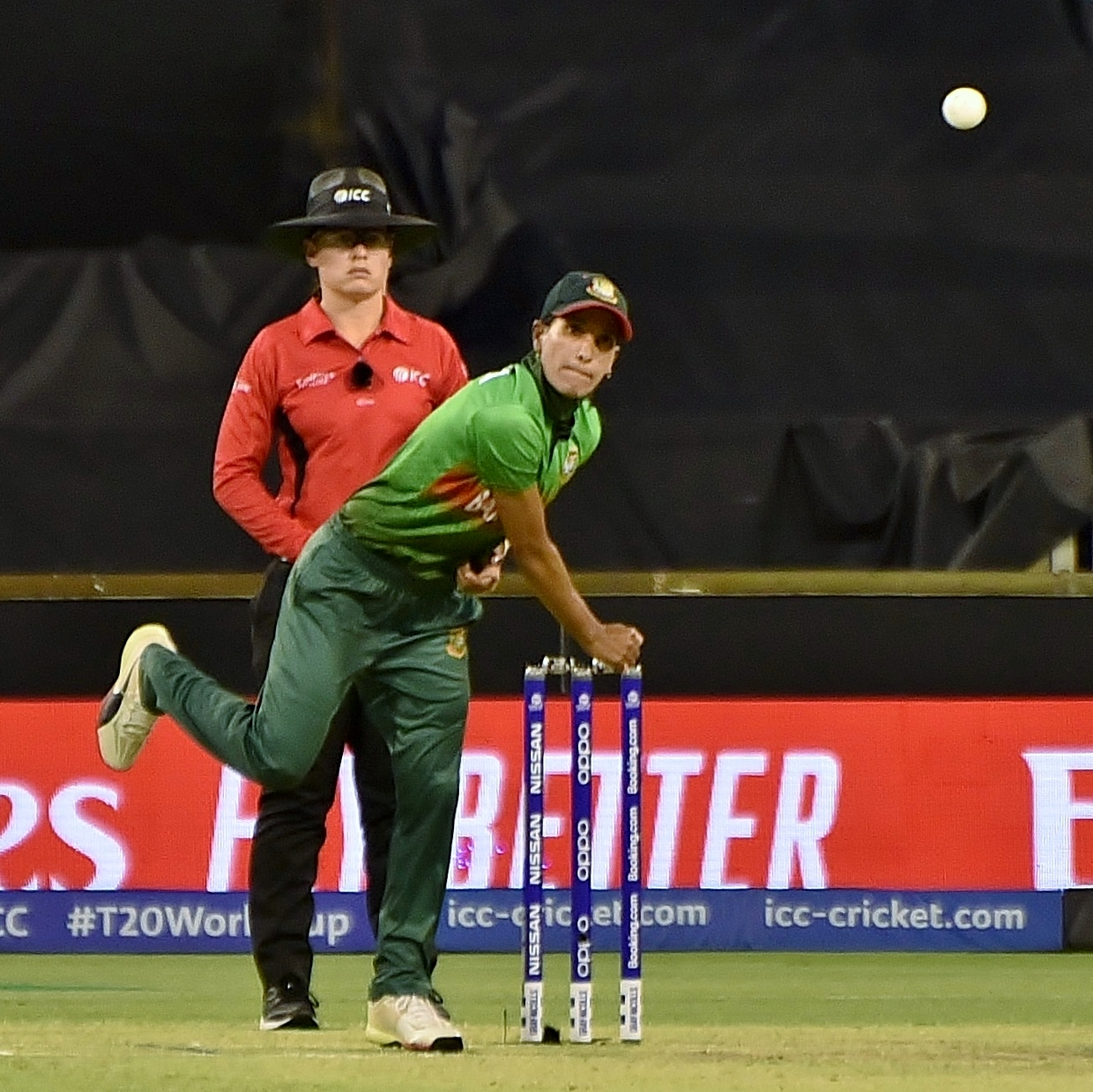
Salma bowling for Bangladesh during the 2020 ICC Women's T20 World Cup

Salma made her T20I debut against Ireland on 28 August 2012. In June 2018, she was part of Bangladesh's squad that won their first ever Women's Asia Cup title, winning the 2018 Women's Twenty20 Asia Cup tournament. Later the same month, she was named as the captain of Bangladesh for the 2018 ICC Women's World Twenty20 Qualifier tournament.

In October 2018, she was named as the captain of Bangladesh's squad for the 2018 ICC Women's World Twenty20 tournament in the West Indies. She was the joint-leading wicket-taker for Bangladesh in the tournament, with six dismissals in four matches.

In August 2019, she was named as the captain of Bangladesh's squad for the 2019 ICC Women's World Twenty20 Qualifier tournament in Scotland. In November 2019, she was named as the captain of Bangladesh's squad for the cricket tournament at the 2019 South Asian Games. The Bangladesh team beat Sri Lanka by two runs in the final to win the gold medal.

In January 2020, she was named as the captain of Bangladesh's squad for the 2020 ICC Women's T20 World Cup in Australia. She was the leading wicket-taker for Bangladesh in the tournament, with six dismissals in four matches.

In November 2021, she was named in Bangladesh's team for the 2021 Women's Cricket World Cup Qualifier tournament in Zimbabwe. In January 2022, she was named in Bangladesh's team for both the 2022 Commonwealth Games Cricket Qualifier tournament in Malaysia, and the 2022 Women's Cricket World Cup in New Zealand.

== See also ==
- List of IPL Trailblazers cricketers
