= Sana Mir =

Pakistani cricketer

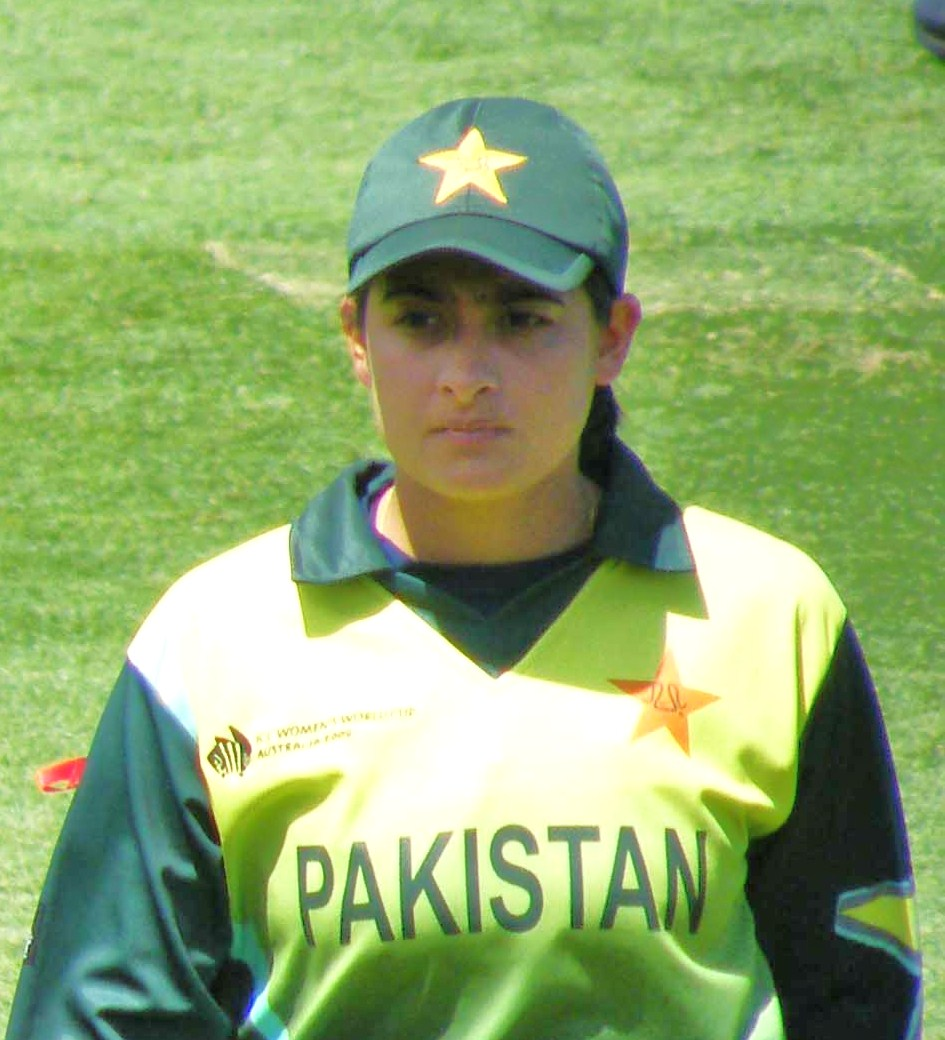
- Mir in March 2009

Personal information
- Full name: Sana Mir
- Born: 5 January 1986 (age 40); Abbottabad, Khyber Pakhtunkhwa, Pakistan
- Batting: Right-handed
- Bowling: Right-arm off break
- Role: All-rounder

International information
- National side: Pakistan (2005–2019)
- ODI debut (cap 41): 28 December 2005 v Sri Lanka
- Last ODI: 4 November 2019 v Bangladesh
- ODI shirt no.: 5
- T20I debut (cap 10): 25 May 2009 v Ireland
- Last T20I: 28 October 2019 v Bangladesh

Domestic team information
- Years: Team
- 2005/06–2007/08: Karachi
- 2009/10–2018/19: Zarai Taraqiati Bank Limited

Career statistics
Competition	WODI	WT20I	WLA	WT20
Matches	120	106	198	164
Runs scored	1,630	825	3,202	1,465
Batting average	17.91	14.22	24.41	17.23
100s/50s	0/3	0/0	2/14	0/1
Top score	52	48*	104*	50*
Balls bowled	5,942	2,246	8,898	3,313
Wickets	151	89	272	132
Bowling average	24.27	23.21	18.06	22.15
5 wickets in innings	1	0	4	0
10 wickets in match	0	0	0	0
Best bowling	5/32	4/13	5/9	4/9
Catches/stumpings	42/–	26/–	76/–	42/–
Medal record
Representing Pakistan
Women's Cricket
Asian Games
Gold medal – first place	2010 Guangzhou	Team
Gold medal – first place	2014 Incheon	Team
- Source: CricketArchive, 5 January 2022

Sana Mir (born 5 January 1986) is a Pakistani cricket commentator and former cricketer who served as a captain of the Pakistan national women's cricket team in ODIs and T20Is. She played in 226 international matches, including 137 where she captained the side. She was the first bowler for Pakistan to take 100 wickets in WODIs. She played domestic cricket for Karachi and Zarai Taraqiati Bank Limited. She is part of the International Cricket Council’s Hall of Fame.

In October 2018, she became the first Pakistani women cricketer to rank number 1 in ICC ODI bowler ranking. She has led Pakistan to two consecutive women's cricket gold medals at the Asian Games, in 2010 and 2014. She was announced Player of the Tournament at the 2008 Women's Cricket World Cup Qualifier, and currently ranks 1st in the Women's ODI Bowlers in the ICC Player Rankings. She had been in Top 20 ICC rankings for the last nine years of her career. During her Captaincy 8 players from Pakistan have made their way into the top 20 ICC rankings.

In February 2017, during the 2017 Women's Cricket World Cup Qualifier, she became the first Pakistan woman to take 100 wickets in WODIs. In July 2017, Mir became the first women player to represent Pakistan in 100 ODIs. In September 2017, Bismah Maroof was made captain of Pakistan women's ODI team, after Mir stepped down from the role. In February 2019, she became the first woman for Pakistan to play in 100 Women's Twenty20 International matches. In November 2019, she announced that she would be taking a break from international cricket. On 25 April 2020, she announced her retirement from international cricket. In May 2022, Mir temporarily came out of retirement to captain South Coast Sapphires in the 2022 FairBreak Invitational T20.

== Early life ==
Sana was born in Abbottabad, into a military family from Rawalpindi. She is of Kashmiri descent, and keeps her Kashmiri surname "Mir". Her father, Mir Moatazid, was a colonel in Pakistan Army and during her father's service she lived in different cantonments. She received her early education from Rawalpindi and then studied briefly during her stay in Gujranwala Cantonment. She completed her matriculation in HITEC HEAVY INDUSTRIES TAXILA EDUCATION CITY Taxila Cantonment. Later, her family moved to Karachi where she completed her intermediate and bachelor's degrees.

After completion of intermediate, she was admitted to the National University of Sciences & Technology (NUST), but could not complete the engineering degree due to her focus on cricket.

== Domestic career ==
In 2011, by winning the National Championship for the fourth time in a row, Sana Mir became the most successful captain of Pakistan at domestic level.

In 2012, the ZTBL team won the first ever BB tournament and 7th National championship under her captaincy, making it five in a row.

In 2013, the ZTBL team won the second BB tournament and 8th National championship under her captaincy. This made it six in a row.

== International career ==
=== Captaincy ===
On 4 May 2009, Mir was handed the Pakistan captaincy for the Women's World Twenty20. Mir retained the captaincy for the forthcoming 2010 ICC Women's Cricket Challenge in South Africa.

At the 2010 Asian Games, Mir led the team to a gold medal win against Bangladesh in the final.

Mir also led the Pakistan team to their first ever tournament win in both the T20 and ODI formats when they played in Sri Lanka in 2011. The teams in the quadrangular cup were Sri Lanka, Pakistan, Ireland, and the Netherlands. She was also awarded the Player of the Match title in the T20 quadrangular-cup final against the Netherlands.

The women's team qualified for the 2012 T20 and 2013 Women's ODI world cup under her captaincy. For the first time ever, the team also beat South Africa, thereby, improving their world ranking from 8 to 6.

Pakistan women team showed their best performance on a European tour in 2013. The team beat England for the first time in any format and levelled the t20 series. The team won 11 matches in a row. After the completion of this tour Pakistan women's team has 6 members in ICC top 20 players ranking.

At the 2014 Asian Games, Mir led the team to a second successive gold medal win against Bangladesh in a rain-affected final.

In October 2018, she was named in Pakistan's squad for the 2018 ICC Women's World Twenty20 tournament in the West Indies.

== Awards and honours ==
On 23 March 2012, Mir became the first ever female cricketer from Pakistan to be awarded Tamgha-e-Imtiaz for her services in cricket.

In 2013, Mir received the PCB Woman Cricketer of the Year 2012 award.

In 2017, Mir was named among “Asia 21 Young Leaders” by Asia Society.

In 2018, PCB awarded Mir the 'Best ODI Player (Women)'.

In 2025, Mir became the first female cricketer from Pakistan to be inducted into the International Cricket Council’s Hall of Fame.

In November 2026, Pakistan Cricket Board added Mir to its Hall of Fame 2025 for her exceptional performances and contributions to cricket in Pakistan.
