= Rumana Ahmed =

Bangladeshi cricketer

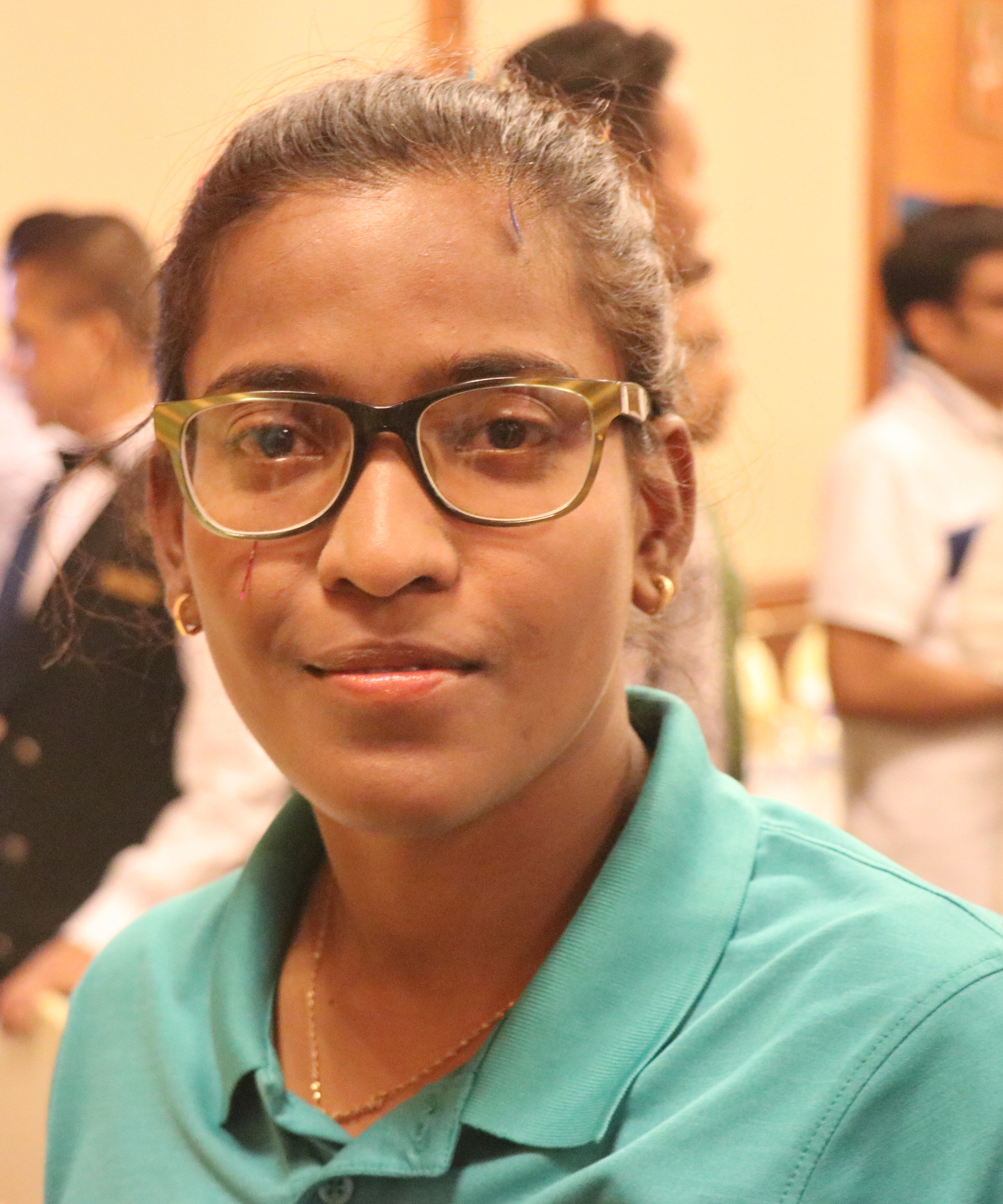
- Rumana Ahmed in 2018

Personal information
- Full name: Rumana Ahmed
- Born: 29 May 1991 (age 35); Khulna, Bangladesh
- Height: 5 ft 3 in (1.60 m)
- Batting: Right-handed
- Bowling: Right-arm leg break
- Role: All-rounder

International information
- National side: Bangladesh (2011–present)
- ODI debut (cap 6): 26 November 2011 v Ireland
- Last ODI: 11 December 2022 v New Zealand
- T20I debut (cap 7): 28 August 2012 v Ireland
- Last T20I: 17 February 2023 v New Zealand

Domestic team information
- Years: Team
- 2008/09-2017/18: Khulna Division
- 2021/22–present: Eastern Zone

Career statistics
Competition	WODI	WT20I
Matches	49	81
Runs scored	954	823
Batting average	23.26	13.27
100s/50s	0/5	0/1
Top score	75	50
Balls bowled	2,050	1,508
Wickets	50	75
Bowling average	25.00	18.40
5 wickets in innings	0	0
10 wickets in match	0	0
Best bowling	4/20	3/2
Catches/stumpings	18/–	12/–
Medal record
Representing Bangladesh
Women's Cricket
Asian Games
Silver medal – second place	2010 Guangzhou	Team
Silver medal – second place	2014 Incheon	Team
Bronze medal – third place	2022 Hangzhou	Team
Women's Asia Cup
Winner	2018 Malaysia
- Source: ESPN Cricinfo, 13 February 2023

Rumana Ahmed (Bengali: রুমানা আহমেদ) (born 29 May 1991) is a Bangladeshi cricketer who plays for the Bangladesh cricket team. She plays as a right-handed batter and right-arm leg break bowler.

== Early life ==
Ahmed was born on 29 May 1991 in Khulna, Bangladesh.

== Career ==
Ahmed made her ODI debut against Ireland on 26 November 2011. She took her ODI best bowling figures on 12 April 2013, taking 4/20 against India. In 2016, Ahmed became the first Bangladeshi women to take an international hat-trick, doing so in an ODI against Ireland.

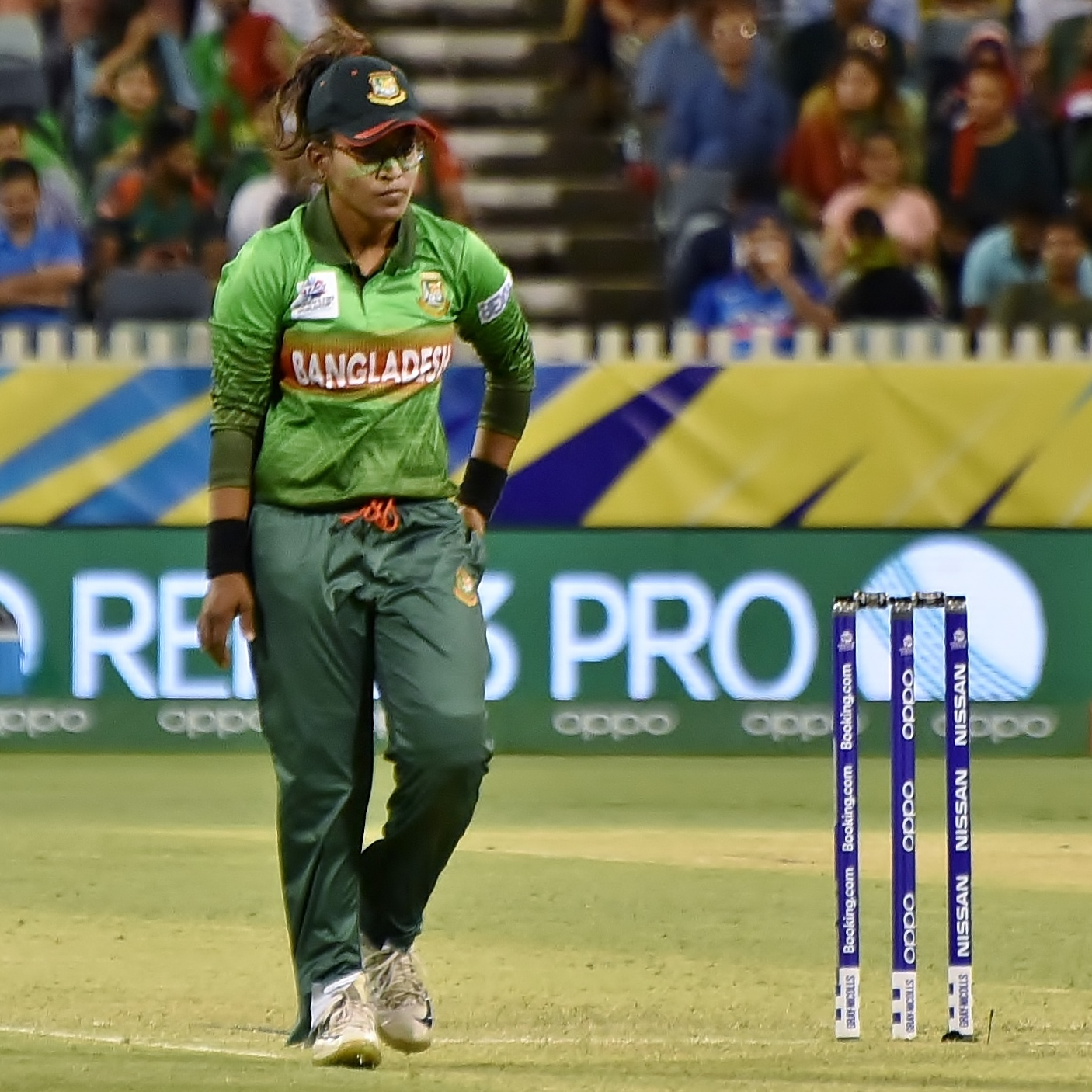
Ahmed playing for Bangladesh during the 2020 ICC Women's T20 World Cup

Ahmed made her T20I debut against Ireland on 28 August 2012. In June 2018, she was part of Bangladesh's squad that won their first ever Women's Asia Cup title, winning the 2018 Women's Twenty20 Asia Cup tournament. Later the same month, she was named in Bangladesh's squad for the 2018 ICC Women's World Twenty20 Qualifier tournament. She was the leading wicket-taker for Bangladesh in the tournament, with ten dismissals in five matches.

In October 2018, she was named in Bangladesh's squad for the 2018 ICC Women's World Twenty20 tournament in the West Indies. Ahead of the tournament, the ICC named her as the star of the team and one of the players to watch. In January 2020, she was named as the vice-captain of Bangladesh's squad for the 2020 ICC Women's T20 World Cup in Australia.

In November 2021, she was named in Bangladesh's team for the 2021 Women's Cricket World Cup Qualifier tournament in Zimbabwe. In January 2022, she was named in Bangladesh's team for the 2022 Commonwealth Games Cricket Qualifier tournament in Malaysia. Later the same month, she was named in Bangladesh's team for the 2022 Women's Cricket World Cup in New Zealand.

=== Other cricket ===
Ahmed was a member of the team that won a silver medal in cricket against the China national women's cricket team at the 2010 Asian Games in Guangzhou, China. Rumana performed well with both bat and ball.

In October 2019, she was named in the Women's Global Development Squad, ahead of a five-match series in Australia.
