= Ayasha Rahman =

Bangladeshi cricketer (born 1994)

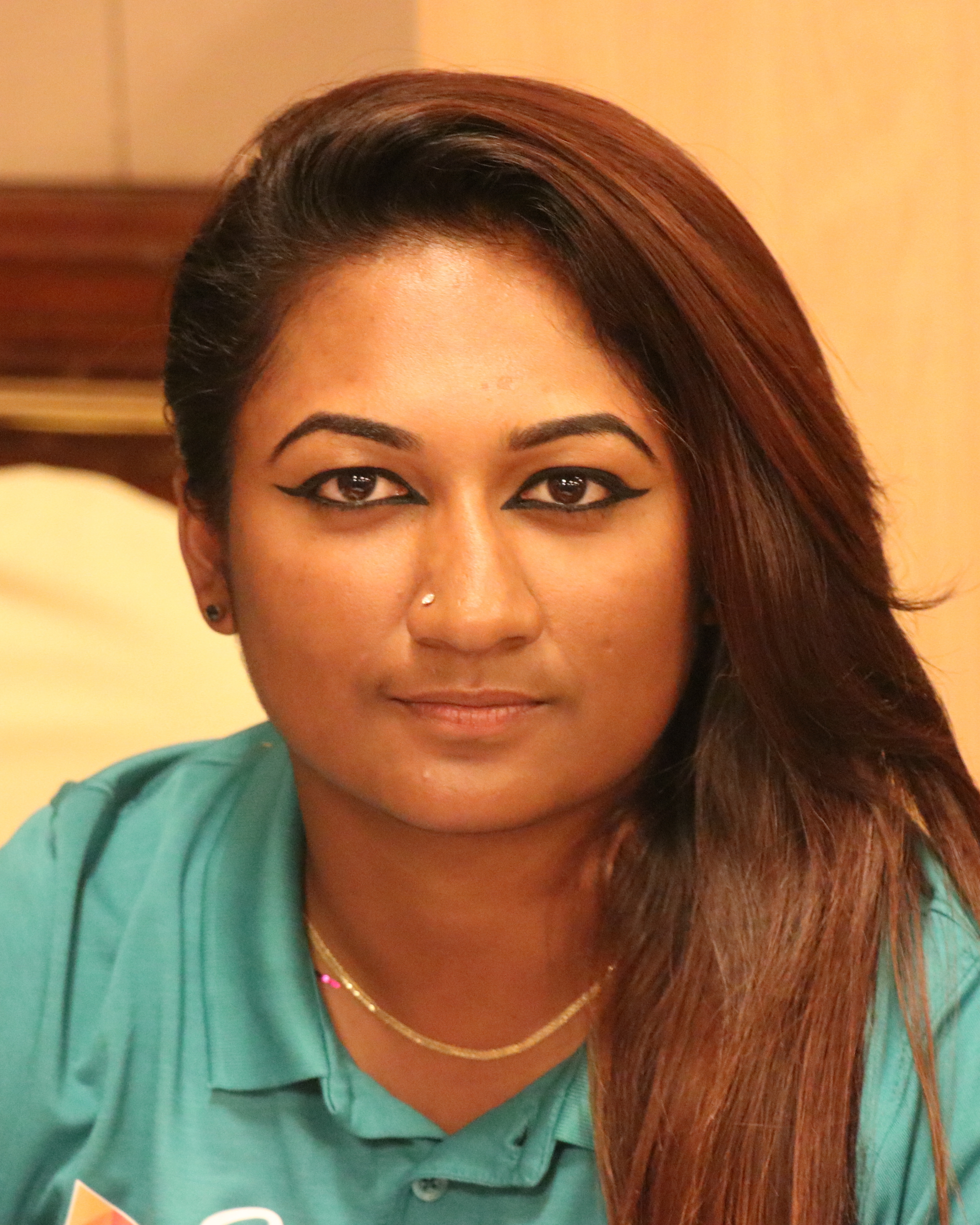
- Ayasha Rahman in 2018

Personal information
- Full name: Ayasha Rahman Shukhtara Boishakhi
- Born: 2 February 1994 (age 32); Khulna, Bangladesh
- Batting: Right-handed
- Bowling: Right-arm off break
- Role: All-rounder

International information
- National side: Bangladesh (2012–present)
- ODI debut (cap 10): 26 November 2011 2011 v Ireland
- Last ODI: 8 October 2018 v Pakistan
- T20I debut (cap 11): 28 August 2012 v Ireland
- Last T20I: 2 March 2020 v Sri Lanka

Domestic team information
- Years: Team
- 2008/09–2017/18: Khulna Division

Career statistics
| Competition | WODI | WT20I |
|---|---|---|
| Matches | 20 | 61 |
| Runs scored | 329 | 804 |
| Batting average | 17.31 | 14.10 |
| 100s/50s | 0/2 | 0/0 |
| Top score | 70 | 46 |
| Balls bowled | 282 | 156 |
| Wickets | 5 | 5 |
| Bowling average | 34.80 | 30.60 |
| 5 wickets in innings | 0 | 0 |
| 10 wickets in match | 0 | 0 |
| Best bowling | 2/12 | 3/4 |
| Catches/stumpings | 5/– | 13/– |
Medal record
Representing Bangladesh
Women's Cricket
Asian Games
| Silver medal – second place | 2010 Guangzhou | Team |
| Silver medal – second place | 2014 Incheon | Team |
South Asian Games
| Gold medal – first place | 2019 Kathmandu/Pokhara | Team |
Women's Asia Cup
| Winner | 2018 Malaysia |
- Source: CricketArchive, 26 May 2022

Ayasha Rahman Shukhtara Boishakhi (Bengali: আয়শা রহমান সুখতারা বৈশাখী, Bengali pronunciation: [ae̯ʃa rɔɦman sukʰtara boi̯ʃakʰi]; born 2 February 1994) is a Bangladeshi cricketer who plays for the Bangladesh cricket team. She plays as a right-handed batter and right-arm off break bowler. Rahman was born in Khulna, Bangladesh.

== Career ==
Rahman was a member of the team that won the silver medal in the women's cricket tournament at the 2010 Asian Games in Guangzhou, China.

Rahman made her ODI debut against Pakistan on 23 August 2012 and her T20I debut against India on 5 April 2013. In June 2018, she was part of Bangladesh's squad that won their first ever Women's Asia Cup title, winning the 2018 Women's Twenty20 Asia Cup tournament. Later the same month, she was named in Bangladesh's squad for the 2018 ICC Women's World Twenty20 Qualifier tournament. She was the leading run-scorer for Bangladesh in the tournament, with 89 runs in five matches. Following the conclusion of the tournament, she was named as the rising star of Bangladesh's squad by the International Cricket Council (ICC).

In October 2018, she was named in Bangladesh's squad for the 2018 ICC Women's World Twenty20 tournament in the West Indies, where she became the leading run-scorer for Bangladesh, with 59 runs in four matches.

In August 2019, she was named in Bangladesh's squad for the 2019 ICC Women's World Twenty20 Qualifier tournament in Scotland. In November 2019, she was named in Bangladesh's squad for the cricket tournament at the 2019 South Asian Games. The Bangladesh team beat Sri Lanka by two runs in the final to win the gold medal. In January 2020, she was named in Bangladesh's squad for the 2020 ICC Women's T20 World Cup in Australia.
