= 2018 Women's World Twenty20 =

6th edition of the Women's T20 World Cup

- Dates: 9 – 24 November 2018
- Administrator: International Cricket Council
- Cricket format: Women's Twenty20 International
- Tournament format(s): Group stage and knockout
- Host: West Indies
- Champions: Australia (4th title)
- Runners-up: England
- Participants: 10
- Matches: 23
- Player of the series: (Australia) Alyssa Healy
- Most runs: (Australia) Alyssa Healy (225)
- Most wickets: (Cricket West Indies) Deandra Dottin (Australia) Ashleigh Gardner (Australia) Megan Schutt (10)
- Official website: iccworldtwenty20.com

The 2018 Women's World Twenty20 was the sixth edition of the Women's World Twenty20, hosted in the West Indies from 9 to 24 November 2018. It the second World Twenty20 hosted by the West Indies (after the 2010 edition), and the West Indies were the defending champions.

The tournament was awarded to the West Indies Cricket Board (WICB) at the 2013 annual conference of the International Cricket Council (ICC). The tournament's dates were confirmed at an ICC board meeting in January 2015. In February 2017, the ICC confirmed that this would be the first T20 tournament that uses the Decision Review System, with one review per side.

The qualifier tournament for the competition was held in July 2018 in the Netherlands. Both Bangladesh and Ireland won their respective semi-final matches in the qualifier, to advance to the Women's World Twenty20 tournament.

The first match scheduled to be played in Saint Lucia, between England and Sri Lanka, was abandoned due to rain. With further rain forecast in Saint Lucia, the ICC looked at a contingency plan of moving other group games to Antigua. The following day, the ICC confirmed that the Group A matches would remain in Saint Lucia. The ICC cited logistical issues and cost as the main factors for not moving the fixtures.

Australia in Group B qualified for the semi-finals, with their win against New Zealand, to give them three wins from three matches. India, also in Group B, qualified for the semi-finals, after they beat Ireland by 52 runs, with three wins from three matches. In Group A, tournament hosts the West Indies, along with England, progressed to the semi-finals, after wins in their penultimate group-stage fixtures. In the first semi-final, the West Indies faced Australia, with England and India playing each other in the second semi-final. Australia beat the West Indies by 71 runs and England beat India by 8 wickets to progress to the final.

Australia won their fourth title after beating England in the final by 8 wickets. Meg Lanning, captain of the Australian team said that the victory was "the most satisfying win I've been involved in" adding that "there will be some big celebrations". England's captain, Heather Knight, said that the team did not post a competitive total, but was "proud of the girls for reaching another world final". Australia's Alyssa Healy was named the player of the tournament.

== Teams and qualification ==
Eight teams qualified automatically and they were joined by two teams from the qualifier tournament.

Team	Qualification
Australia	Automatic qualification
England	Automatic qualification
India	Automatic qualification
New Zealand	Automatic qualification
Pakistan	Automatic qualification
South Africa	Automatic qualification
Sri Lanka	Automatic qualification
West Indies	Host
Bangladesh	1st in Qualifier tournament
Ireland	2nd in Qualifier tournament

== Squads ==
On 10 October 2018 the ICC confirmed all the squads for the tournament.

== Venues ==
In January 2018, the ICC announced that three venues would be hosting matches:

Guyana	Saint Lucia	Antigua
Providence	Gros Islet	North Sound
Guyana National Stadium; Capacity: 15,000	Daren Sammy Cricket Ground; Capacity: 15,000	Sir Vivian Richards Stadium; Capacity: 10,000
Matches: 11	Matches: 9	Matches: 3

== Match officials ==
On 25 October 2018, the ICC appointed the officials for the tournament. Along with the twelve umpires, Richie Richardson and Graeme Labrooy were also named as the match referees.

- Gregory Brathwaite
- Kim Cotton
- Shaun George
- Wayne Knights
- Nitin Menon
- Sam Nogajski

- Claire Polosak
- Ahsan Raza
- Sue Redfern
- Langton Rusere
- Sharfuddoula
- Jacqueline Williams

== Prize money ==
The International Cricket Council declared a total prize money pool of US$750,000 for the tournament, an increase from the $400,000 for the 2016 event. The prize money was allocated according to the performance of the team as follows:

Prize money
Stage	Teams	Prize money (USD)	Total (USD)
Winner	1	$250,000	$250,000
Runner-up	1	$125,000	$125,000
Losing semi-finalists	2	$62,500	$125,000
Winner of each pool match	20	$9,500	$190,000
Teams that do not pass the group stage	6	$10,000	$60,000
Total	$750,000		

== Group stage ==
The fixtures for the tournament were confirmed in June 2018. All times are given in Eastern Caribbean Time (UTC-04:00)

=== Group A ===
Pos	Team	Pld	W	L	T	NR	Pts	NRR
1	West Indies	4	4	0	0	0	8	2.241
2	England	4	2	1	0	1	5	1.317
3	South Africa	4	2	2	0	0	4	−0.277
4	Sri Lanka	4	1	2	0	1	3	−1.171
5	Bangladesh	4	0	4	0	0	0	−1.989

Source: ESPNCricinfo

9 November 2018
20:00 (N)
Scorecard

West Indies; 106/8 (20 overs)	v	Bangladesh; 46 (14.4 overs)
Kycia Knight 32 (24); Jahanara Alam 3/23 (4 overs)		Fargana Hoque 8 (8); Deandra Dottin 5/5 (3.4 overs)

West Indies Women won by 60 runs
Guyana National Stadium, Providence
Umpires: Sue Redfern (Eng) and Langton Rusere (Zim)
Player of the match: Deandra Dottin (WI)

- Bangladesh Women won the toss and elected to field.
- Deandra Dottin took her first five-wicket haul in WT20Is and took the best figures by a West Indian in WT20Is.
- Bangladesh's total was the lowest by any team at an ICC Women's World Twenty20.

10 November 2018
16:00 (D/N)
Scorecard

England	v	Sri Lanka

Match abandoned
Daren Sammy Cricket Ground, Gros Islet
Umpires: Kim Cotton (NZ) and Ahsan Raza (Pak)

- Sri Lanka Women Won the toss and elected to field.
- No play was possible due to rain.

12 November 2018
16:00 (D/N)
Scorecard

Bangladesh; 76/9 (20 overs)	v	England; 64/3 (9.3 overs)
Ayasha Rahman 39 (52); Kirstie Gordon 3/16 (4 overs)		Amy Jones 28* (24); Salma Khatun 2/17 (3 overs)

England Women won by 7 wickets (DLS method)
Daren Sammy Cricket Ground, Gros Islet
Umpires: Sam Nogajski (Aus) and Jacqueline Williams (WI)
Player of the match: Kirstie Gordon (Eng)

- England Women won the toss and elected to field.
- Rain during England Women's innings set them a revised target of 64 from 16 overs.
- Sophia Dunkley, Kirstie Gordon and Linsey Smith (Eng) all made their WT20I debuts.

12 November 2018
20:00 (N)
Scorecard

Sri Lanka; 99/8 (20 overs)	v	South Africa; 102/3 (18.3 overs)
Shashikala Siriwardene 21 (27); Shabnim Ismail 3/10 (4 overs)		Marizanne Kapp 38 (44); Shashikala Siriwardene 1/12 (4 overs)

South Africa Women won by 7 wickets
Daren Sammy Cricket Ground, Gros Islet
Umpires: Nitin Menon (Ind) and Sharfuddoula (Ban)
Player of the match: Shabnim Ismail (SA)

- South Africa Women won the toss and elected to field.

14 November 2018
16:00 (D/N)
Scorecard

Sri Lanka; 97/7 (20 overs)	v	Bangladesh; 72 (20 overs)
Shashikala Siriwardene 31 (33); Jahanara Alam 3/21 (4 overs)		Nigar Sultana 20 (41); Chamari Athapaththu 3/17 (3 overs)

Sri Lanka Women won by 25 runs
Daren Sammy Cricket Ground, Gros Islet
Umpires: Nitin Menon (Ind) and Jacqueline Williams (WI)
Player of the match: Shashikala Siriwardene (SL)

- Bangladesh Women won the toss and elected to field.
- This was the first occasion in WT20Is that a wicket was taken with the first ball of both innings.
- Bangladesh Women were eliminated as a result of this match.

14 November 2018
20:00 (N)
Scorecard

West Indies; 107/7 (20 overs)	v	South Africa; 76 (18.4 overs)
Kycia Knight 32 (36); Shabnim Ismail 3/12 (4 overs)		Marizanne Kapp 26 (34); Stafanie Taylor 4/12 (3.4 overs)

West Indies Women won by 31 runs
Daren Sammy Cricket Ground, Gros Islet
Umpires: Ahsan Raza (Pak) and Sharfuddoula (Ban)
Player of the match: Stafanie Taylor (WI)

- South Africa Women won the toss and elected to field.
- Chloe Tryon played in her 50th WT20I for South Africa.

16 November 2018
16:00 (D/N)
Scorecard

South Africa; 85 (19.3 overs)	v	England; 87/3 (14.1 overs)
Chloe Tryon 27 (28); Nat Sciver 3/4 (4 overs)		Danni Wyatt 27 (27); Dane van Niekerk 2/13 (3.1 overs)

England Women won by 7 wickets
Daren Sammy Cricket Ground, Gros Islet
Umpires: Kim Cotton (NZ) and Ahsan Raza (Pak)
Player of the match: Nat Sciver (Eng)

- South Africa Women won the toss and elected to bat.
- Heather Knight played her 50th WT20I for England.
- Anya Shrubsole (Eng) took a hat-trick.
- Danielle Wyatt (Eng) scored her 1,000th run in WT20Is.
- South Africa Women were eliminated as a result of this match.

16 November 2018
20:00 (N)
Scorecard

West Indies; 187/5 (20 overs)	v	Sri Lanka; 104 (17.4 overs)
Hayley Matthews 62 (36); Oshadi Ranasinghe 1/21 (4 overs)		Chamari Athapaththu 44 (35); Hayley Matthews 3/16 (3 overs)

West Indies Women won by 83 runs
Daren Sammy Cricket Ground, Gros Islet
Umpires: Sam Nogajski (Aus) and Sharfuddoula (Ban)
Player of the match: Hayley Matthews (WI)

- West Indies Women won the toss and elected to bat.
- West Indies Women and England Women both qualified for the semi-finals as a result of this match.
- Sri Lanka Women were eliminated as a result of this match.

18 November 2018
16:00 (D/N)
Scorecard

England; 115/8 (20 overs)	v	West Indies; 117/6 (19.3 overs)
Sophia Dunkley 35 (30); Shakera Selman 2/15 (4 overs)		Deandra Dottin 46 (52); Anya Shrubsole 3/10 (3.3 overs)

West Indies Women won by 4 wickets
Daren Sammy Cricket Ground, Gros Islet
Umpires: Kim Cotton (NZ) and Nitin Menon (Ind)
Player of the match: Deandra Dottin (WI)

- West Indies Women won the toss and elected to field.

18 November 2018
20:00 (N)
Scorecard

South Africa; 109/9 (20 overs)	v	Bangladesh; 79/5 (20 overs)
Marizanne Kapp 25 (19); Salma Khatun 3/20 (4 overs)		Rumana Ahmed 34* (40); Moseline Daniels 1/6 (3 overs)

South Africa Women won by 30 runs
Daren Sammy Cricket Ground, Gros Islet
Umpires: Sam Nogajski (Aus) and Jacqueline Williams (WI)
Player of the match: Marizanne Kapp (SA)

- Bangladesh Women won the toss and elected to field.

=== Group B ===
Pos	Team	Pld	W	L	T	NR	Pts	NRR
1	India	4	4	0	0	0	8	1.827
2	Australia	4	3	1	0	0	6	1.515
3	New Zealand	4	2	2	0	0	4	1.031
4	Pakistan	4	1	3	0	0	2	−0.987
5	Ireland	4	0	4	0	0	0	−3.525

Source: ESPNCricinfo

9 November 2018
11:00
Scorecard

India; 194/5 (20 overs)	v	New Zealand; 160/9 (20 overs)
Harmanpreet Kaur 103 (51); Lea Tahuhu 2/18 (3 overs)		Suzie Bates 67 (50); Dayalan Hemalatha 3/26 (4 overs)

India Women won by 34 runs
Guyana National Stadium, Providence
Umpires: Gregory Brathwaite (WI) and Claire Polosak (Aus)
Player of the match: Harmanpreet Kaur (Ind)

- India Women won the toss and elected to bat.
- Dayalan Hemalatha (Ind) made her WT20I debut.
- Jemimah Rodrigues and Harmanpreet Kaur's 134-run partnership was India's highest for any wicket in WT20Is.
- Harmanpreet Kaur became the first woman for India to score a century in WT20Is and the third for any country to score one at an ICC Women's World Twenty20.
- India's total was the highest by any team at an ICC Women's World Twenty20.
- Suzie Bates (NZ) became the highest scorer in ICC Women's World Twenty20s.

9 November 2018
16:00 (D/N)
Scorecard

Australia; 165/5 (20 overs)	v	Pakistan; 113/8 (20 overs)
Alyssa Healy 48 (29); Aliya Riaz 2/25 (4 overs)		Bismah Maroof 26 (25); Megan Schutt 2/13 (4 overs)

Australia Women won by 52 runs
Guyana National Stadium, Providence
Umpires: Shaun George (SA) and Jacqueline Williams (WI)
Player of the match: Alyssa Healy (Aus)

- Australia Women won the toss and elected to bat.

11 November 2018
11:00
Scorecard

Pakistan; 133/7 (20 overs)	v	India; 137/3 (19 overs)
Bismah Maroof 53 (49); Poonam Yadav 2/22 (4 overs)		Mithali Raj 56 (47); Nida Dar 1/17 (4 overs)

India Women won by 7 wickets
Guyana National Stadium, Providence
Umpires: Gregory Brathwaite (WI) and Sue Redfern (Eng)
Player of the match: Mithali Raj (Ind)

- India Women won the toss and elected to field.
- This was Pakistan's highest total in an ICC Women's World Twenty20.
- India were awarded ten penalty runs after Pakistan's cricketers ran onto the danger area of the pitch on two separate occasions.

11 November 2018
16:00 (D/N)
Scorecard

Ireland; 93/6 (20 overs)	v	Australia; 94/1 (9.1 overs)
Kim Garth 24 (26); Ellyse Perry 2/12 (4 overs)		Alyssa Healy 56* (31); Kim Garth 1/17 (2.1 overs)

Australia Women won by 9 wickets
Guyana National Stadium, Providence
Umpires: Wayne Knights (NZ) and Langton Rusere (Zim)
Player of the match: Alyssa Healy (Aus)

- Ireland Women won the toss and elected to bat.
- Kim Garth made her 100th international appearance for Ireland.
- Australia were awarded five penalty runs after Ireland's cricketers ran onto the danger area of the pitch.
- Alyssa Healy's (Aus) 21-ball half-century was the fastest at an ICC Women's World Twenty20.

13 November 2018
16:00 (D/N)
Scorecard

Pakistan; 139/6 (20 overs)	v	Ireland; 101/9 (20 overs)
Javeria Khan 74* (52); Lucy O'Reilly 3/19 (4 overs)		Isobel Joyce 30 (31); Nashra Sandhu 2/8 (4 overs)

Pakistan Women won by 38 runs
Guyana National Stadium, Providence
Umpires: Gregory Brathwaite (WI) and Claire Polosak (Aus)
Player of the match: Javeria Khan (Pak)

- Pakistan Women won the toss and elected to bat.
- Celeste Raack (Ire) made her WT20I debut.
- Javeria Khan made the highest score by a Pakistan cricketer in WT20Is.
- This was Pakistan's highest total in an ICC Women's World Twenty20.

13 November 2018
20:00 (N)
Scorecard

Australia; 153/7 (20 overs)	v	New Zealand; 120 (17.3 overs)
Alyssa Healy 53 (38); Leigh Kasperek 3/25 (4 overs)		Suzie Bates 48 (42); Megan Schutt 3/12 (3 overs)

Australia Women won by 33 runs
Guyana National Stadium, Providence
Umpires: Shaun George (SA) and Langton Rusere (Zim)
Player of the match: Alyssa Healy (Aus)

- Australia Women won the toss and elected to bat.
- Australia Women qualified for the semi-finals as a result of this match.

15 November 2018
11:00
Scorecard

India; 145/6 (20 overs)	v	Ireland; 93/8 (20 overs)
Mithali Raj 51 (56); Kim Garth 2/22 (4 overs)		Isobel Joyce 33 (38); Radha Yadav 3/25 (4 overs)

India Women won by 52 runs
Guyana National Stadium, Providence
Umpires: Wayne Knights (NZ) and Langton Rusere (Zim)
Player of the match: Mithali Raj (Ind)

- Ireland Women won the toss and elected to field.
- Clare Shillington (Ire) scored her 1,000th run in WT20Is.
- India Women qualified for the semi-finals as a result of this match.
- Pakistan Women, New Zealand Women and Ireland Women were all eliminated as a result of this match.

15 November 2018
16:00 (D/N)
Scorecard

New Zealand; 144/6 (20 overs)	v	Pakistan; 90 (18 overs)
Suzie Bates 35 (31); Aliya Riaz 2/29 (4 overs)		Javeria Khan 36 (23); Jess Watkin 3/9 (4 overs)

New Zealand Women won by 54 runs
Guyana National Stadium, Providence
Umpires: Shaun George (SA) and Claire Polosak (Aus)
Player of the match: Jess Watkin (NZ)

- Pakistan Women won the toss and elected to field.

17 November 2018
11:00
Scorecard

India; 167/8 (20 overs)	v	Australia; 119 (19.4 overs)
Smriti Mandhana 83 (55); Ellyse Perry 3/16 (3 overs)		Ellyse Perry 39* (28); Anuja Patil 3/15 (3.4 overs)

India Women won by 48 runs
Guyana National Stadium, Providence
Umpires: Gregory Brathwaite (WI) and Wayne Knights (NZ)
Player of the match: Smriti Mandhana (Ind)

- India Women won the toss and elected to bat.
- Tayla Vlaeminck (Aus) made her WT20I debut.
- Ellyse Perry became the first cricketer for Australia, male or female, to play in 100 Twenty20 International matches.
- Smriti Mandhana (Ind) scored her 1,000th run in WT20Is.

17 November 2018
16:00 (D/N)
Scorecard

Ireland; 79/9 (20 overs)	v	New Zealand; 81/2 (7.3 overs)
Gaby Lewis 39 (36); Leigh Kasperek 3/19 (4 overs)		Sophie Devine 51 (22); Laura Delany 1/9 (1 over)

New Zealand Women won by 8 wickets
Guyana National Stadium, Providence
Umpires: Shaun George (SA) and Sue Redfern (Eng)
Player of the match: Sophie Devine (NZ)

- Ireland Women won the toss and elected to bat.
- Isobel Joyce, Cecelia Joyce, Ciara Metcalfe and Clare Shillington all played in their final match for Ireland Women.
- Suzie Bates (NZ) became the first cricketer, male or female, to score 3,000 runs in Twenty20 International matches.
- Sophie Devine's (NZ) 21-ball half-century was the joint-fastest at an ICC Women's World Twenty20.

== Knockout stage ==
Semifinals
A1	West Indies	71 (17.3 overs)
B2	Australia	142/5 (20 overs)
B1	India	112 (19.3 overs)
A2	England	116/2 (17.1 overs)

Final
B2	Australia	106/2 (15.1 overs)
A2	England	105 (19.4 overs)

=== Semi-finals ===
22 November 2018
16:00 (D/N)
Scorecard

Australia; 142/5 (20 overs)	v	West Indies; 71 (17.3 overs)
Alyssa Healy 46 (38); Stafanie Taylor 1/20 (4 overs)		Stafanie Taylor 16 (28); Ellyse Perry 2/2 (2 overs)

Australia Women won by 71 runs
Sir Vivian Richards Stadium, North Sound
Umpires: Nitin Menon (Ind) and Langton Rusere (Zim)
Player of the match: Alyssa Healy (Aus)

- West Indies Women won the toss and elected to field.

22 November 2018
20:00 (N)
Scorecard

India; 112 (19.3 overs)	v	England; 116/2 (17.1 overs)
Smriti Mandhana 34 (23); Heather Knight 3/9 (2 overs)		Amy Jones 53* (45); Radha Yadav 1/20 (4 overs)

England Women won by 8 wickets
Sir Vivian Richards Stadium, North Sound
Umpires: Shaun George (SA) and Claire Polosak (Aus)
Player of the match: Amy Jones (Eng)

- India Women won the toss and elected to bat.

=== Final ===
24 November 2018
20:00 (N)
Scorecard

England; 105 (19.4 overs)	v	Australia; 106/2 (15.1 overs)
Danni Wyatt 43 (37); Ashleigh Gardner 3/22 (4 overs)		Ashleigh Gardner 33 (26); Sophie Ecclestone 1/12 (4 overs)

Australia Women won by 8 wickets
Sir Vivian Richards Stadium, North Sound
Umpires: Shaun George (SA) and Langton Rusere (Zim)
Player of the match: Ashleigh Gardner (Aus)

- England Women won the toss and elected to bat.
- Ellyse Perry became the first cricketer for Australia, male or female, to take 100 wickets in Twenty20 International matches.

== Statistics ==
=== Most runs ===
Player	Matches	Innings	Runs	Average	SR	HS	100	50	4s	6s
(Australia) Alyssa Healy	6	5	225	56.25	144.23	56*	0	2	33	3
(India) Harmanpreet Kaur	5	5	183	45.75	160.52	103	1	0	12	13
(India) Smriti Mandhana	5	5	178	35.60	125.35	83	0	1	22	5
(New Zealand) Suzie Bates	4	4	161	40.25	119.25	67	0	1	17	1
(Pakistan) Javeria Khan	4	4	136	45.33	130.76	74*	0	1	20	0

=== Most wickets ===
Player	Matches	Innings	Wickets	Overs	Econ.	Ave.	BBI	S/R	4WI	5WI
(Cricket West Indies) Deandra Dottin	5	5	10	13.4	5.63	7.70	5/5	8.2	0	1
(Australia) Ashleigh Gardner	6	6	10	18.0	5.94	10.70	3/22	10.8	0	0
(Australia) Megan Schutt	6	6	10	13.0	5.12	11.10	3/12	13.0	0	0
(Australia) Ellyse Perry	6	6	9	16.0	5.56	9.88	3/16	10.6	0	0
(Cricket West Indies) Stafanie Taylor	5	5	8	15.4	5.23	10.25	4/12	11.7	1	0

=== Team of the tournament ===
On 25 November 2018, ICC announced its team of the tournament. The selection panel consisted of Ian Bishop, Anjum Chopra, Ebony Rainford-Brent, Melinda Farrell and Geoff Allardice.

- (Australia) Alyssa Healy
- (India) Smriti Mandhana
- (England) Amy Jones (wk)
- (India) Harmanpreet Kaur (c)
- (Cricket West Indies) Deandra Dottin
- (Pakistan) Javeria Khan
- (Australia) Ellyse Perry
- (New Zealand) Leigh Kasperek
- (England) Anya Shrubsole
- (England) Kirstie Gordon
- (India) Poonam Yadav
- (Bangladesh) Jahanara Alam (12th woman)
