= Cricket at the 2014 Asian Games – Women's tournament =

International cricket tournament

Women at the 2014 Asian Games
- Venue: Yeonhui Cricket Ground
- Date: 20–26 September 2014
- Competitors: 149 from 10 nations

Medalists
gold medal	Pakistan
silver medal	Bangladesh
bronze medal	Sri Lanka

The Women's cricket competition at the 2014 Asian Games was held in Incheon, South Korea from 20 to 26 September 2014. Ten teams took part in the tournament, which the defending champions Pakistan won in a rain affected final against Bangladesh to claim their second title.

== Squads ==
Bangladesh	China	Hong Kong	Japan
Rumana Ahmed; Salma Khatun; Panna Ghosh; Shohely Akhter; Shaila Sharmin; Fahima Khatun; Sanjida Islam; Lata Mondal; Nuzhat Tasnia; Shahanaz Parvin; Jahanara Alam; Khadija Tul Kubra; Ayasha Rahman; Sharmin Akhter; Fargana Hoque	Wang Meng; Lü Zhongyuan; Zhou Haijie; Wu Juan; Zou Miao; Zhao Ning; Zhou Caiyun; Han Lili; Ruan Xiang; Song Fengfeng; Yu Miao; Zhang Mei; Wu Di; Liu Xiaonan; Huang Zhuo	Mariko Hill; Cindy Ho; Natural Yip; Keenu Gill; Ishitaa Gidwani; To Yee Shan; Jenefer Davis; Godiva Li; Kary Chan; Betty Chan; Annie Ho; Lee Sheung Yu; Amanda Kwok; Emma Lai; Charlotte Chan	Erika Ida; Shizuka Miyaji; Atsuko Kitamura; Aki Umetani; Chihiro Sakamoto; Eri Yamaguchi; Mai Yanagida; Mariko Yamamoto; Etsuko Kobayashi; Shizuka Kubota; Ema Kuribayashi; Manami Takada; Kurumi Ota; Ayako Nakayama
Malaysia	Nepal	Pakistan	South Korea
Siti Mazila Hanafi; Aina Najwa; Dewi Chunam; Winifred Duraisingam; Christina Baret; Jannadiah Halim; Nur Nadihirah; Mahani Ahyar; Nur Aishah; Yusrina Yaakop; Intan Jaafar; Fathinah Nasri; Rewina Mohammad; Emylia Eliani; Jennifer Francis	Rubina Chhetry; Sonu Khadka; Mamta Chaudhary; Sarita Magar; Sita Rana Magar; Kajal Shrestha; Indu Barma; Sobha Aale; Karuna Bhandari; Nary Thapa; Trishna Singh; Saraswati Kumari; Rekha Rawal; Anjali Chand; Mamata Thapa	Bismah Maroof; Sana Mir; Javeria Khan; Nida Dar; Qanita Jalil; Nain Abidi; Asmavia Iqbal; Sidra Nawaz; Kainat Imtiaz; Marina Iqbal; Sumaiya Siddiqi; Sania Khan; Aliya Riaz; Anam Amin; Sadia Yousuf	Song Seung-min; Lee Jin-a; Jeong Ah-ram; Park Se-mi; Oh In-yeong; Kim Bo-kyung; Lee Eun-jin; Park Jin-seup; Jeon Yeon-ju; Hu Mi-jin; Kim Jeong-yoon; Jeong Hye-ji; Ka Ye-bin; Jeon Soon-myeong; An Na
Sri Lanka	Thailand		
Eshani Kaushalya; Dilani Manodara; Sripali Weerakkody; Anushka Sanjeewani; Shashikala Siriwardene; Inoka Ranaweera; Chamari Athapaththu; Yashoda Mendis; Chandima Gunaratne; Nilakshi de Silva; Lasanthi Madushani; Maduri Samuddika; Inoshi Priyadharshani; Udeshika Prabodhani; Chamari Polgampola	Sornnarin Tippoch; Narumon Srisuwan; Wongpaka Liengprasert; Sainammin Saenya; Premwadee Doungsin; Rattana Sangsoma; Nattaya Boochatham; Ratanaporn Padunglerd; Arreeya Priyakhunakorn; Sirintra Saengsakaorat; Naruemol Chaiwai; Chanida Sutthiruang; Natthakan Chantham; Pundarika Prathanmitr; Suleeporn Laomi		

== Results ==
All times are Korea Standard Time (UTC+09:00)

=== Group round ===
==== Group C ====
Pos	Team	Pld	W	L	T	NR	Pts	NRR	Qualification
1	China	2	2	0	0	0	4	0.600	Quarterfinals
2	Hong Kong	2	1	1	0	0	2	0.775	Quarterfinals
3	South Korea	2	0	2	0	0	0	−1.407	

Source: ACC

20 September
9:30
Scorecard

South Korea; 49 (13.2 overs)	v	China; 50/2 (15 overs)
Lee Jin-a 15 (22); Ruan Xiang 5/9 (3 overs)		Zhang Mei 17 (38); Oh In-yeong 1/8 (4 overs)

China won by 8 wickets
Yeonhui Cricket Ground, Incheon
Umpires: Ramani Batumalai (MAS) and Sarika Prasad (SIN)

- South Korea won the toss and elected to bat.

21 September
9:30
Scorecard

China; 83/9 (20 overs)	v	Hong Kong; 79/5 (20 overs)
Zhang Mei 34 (59); Kary Chan 2/9 (2 overs)		Keenu Gill 45* (57); Wang Meng, Zhou Haijie 1/12 (4 overs)

China won by 4 runs
Yeonhui Cricket Ground, Incheon
Umpires: Riaz Chaudhry (KUW) and Mohammed Kamruzzaman (THA)

- China won the toss and elected to bat.

22 September
14:00
Scorecard

Hong Kong; 92/6 (20 overs)	v	South Korea; 57 (15.5 overs)
Keenu Gill 33 (42); Song Seung-min 1/17 (4 overs)		Kim Jeong-yoon 20 (38); Godiva Li 3/6 (2 overs)

Hong Kong won by 35 runs
Yeonhui Cricket Ground, Incheon
Umpires: Liu Jingmin (CHN) and Buddhi Pradhan (NEP)

- Hong Kong won the toss and elected to bat.

==== Group D ====
Pos	Team	Pld	W	L	T	NR	Pts	NRR	Qualification
1	Thailand	2	2	0	0	0	4	1.434	Quarterfinals
2	Nepal	2	1	1	0	0	2	0.772	Quarterfinals
3	Malaysia	2	0	2	0	0	0	−2.083	

Source: ACC

20 September
14:00
Scorecard

Malaysia; 49/8 (20 overs)	v	Thailand; 50/1 (11.4 overs)
Emylia Eliani 13 (35); Natthakan Chantham 4/6 (4 overs)		Natthakan Chantham 16 (29); Intan Jaafar 1/7 (2 overs)

Thailand won by 9 wickets
Yeonhui Cricket Ground, Incheon
Umpires: Riaz Chaudhry (KUW) and Buddhi Pradhan (NEP)

- Malaysia won the toss and elected to bat.

21 September
14:00
Scorecard

Nepal; 64/8 (20 overs)	v	Thailand; 65/4 (15.2 overs)
Nary Thapa 18 (39); Wongpaka Liengprasert 2/9 (4 overs)		Nattaya Boochatham 24* (42); Sarita Magar 2/16 (4 overs)

Thailand won by 6 wickets
Yeonhui Cricket Ground, Incheon
Umpires: Ramani Batumalai (MAS) and Sarika Prasad (SIN)

- Thailand won the toss and elected to field.

22 September
9:30
Scorecard

Nepal; 88/3 (20 overs)	v	Malaysia; 42 (14.5 overs)
Mamta Chaudhary 22* (29); Nur Nadihirah 1/9 (1 over)		Christina Baret 11 (25); Karuna Bhandari 4/6 (3.5 overs)

Nepal won by 46 runs
Yeonhui Cricket Ground, Incheon
Umpires: Mohammed Kamruzzaman (THA) and Riaz Chaudhry (KUW)

- Malaysia won the toss and elected to field.

=== Knockout round ===
Quarterfinals
23 September
Japan	71/7
China	72/3
24 September
Pakistan	97/5
Thailand	46/7
23 September
Sri Lanka	149/5
Hong Kong	67
24 September
Bangladesh	107/4
Nepal	26

Semifinals
25 September
China	37
Pakistan	41/1
25 September
Sri Lanka	70
Bangladesh	95/4

Final
26 September
Pakistan (D/L)	97/6
Bangladesh	38/9
Bronze medal match
26 September
China	65/6
Sri Lanka	66/5

==== Quarterfinals ====
23 September
9:30
Scorecard

Japan; 71/7 (20 overs)	v	China; 72/3 (18.4 overs)
Chihiro Sakamoto 25* (43); Wu Juan 3/11 (4 overs)		Zhang Mei 23 (54); Ayako Nakayama 1/10 (4 overs)

China won by 7 wickets
Yeonhui Cricket Ground, Incheon
Umpires: Ramani Batumalai (MAS) and Riaz Chaudhry (KUW)

- Japan won the toss and elected to bat.

23 September
14:00
Scorecard

Sri Lanka; 149/5 (20 overs)	v	Hong Kong; 67 (17.2 overs)
Lasanthi Madushani 43 (46); Charlotte Chan 1/21 (4 overs)		Keenu Gill 16 (22); Shashikala Siriwardene 4/13 (3.2 overs)

Sri Lanka won by 82 runs
Yeonhui Cricket Ground, Incheon
Umpires: Liu Jingmin (CHN) and Sarika Prasad (SIN)

- Sri Lanka won the toss and elected to bat.

24 September
11:00
Scorecard

Pakistan; 97/5 (14 overs)	v	Thailand; 46/7 (14 overs)
Nain Abidi 40 (40); Wongpaka Liengprasert 1/13 (3 overs)		Nattaya Boochatham 17 (24); Asmavia Iqbal 2/6 (3 overs)

Pakistan won by 51 runs
Yeonhui Cricket Ground, Incheon
Umpires: Ramani Batumalai (MAS) and Buddhi Pradhan (NEP)

- Thailand won the toss and elected to field.
- Rain reduced the match to 14 overs per side.

24 September
14:00
Scorecard

Bangladesh; 107/4 (20 overs)	v	Nepal; 26 (15.2 overs)
Ayasha Rahman 51* (60); Sarita Magar 2/19 (4 overs)		Nary Thapa 8 (13); Salma Khatun 3/1 (3 overs)

Bangladesh won by 81 runs
Yeonhui Cricket Ground, Incheon
Umpires: Liu Jingmin (CHN) and Sarika Prasad (SIN)

- Nepal won the toss and elected to field.

==== Semifinals ====
25 September
9:30
Scorecard

China; 37 (19 overs)	v	Pakistan; 41/1 (8 overs)
Zhang Mei 14 (41); Nida Dar 4/7 (3 overs)		Javeria Khan 21* (23); Zhou Haijie 1/14 (3 overs)

Pakistan won by 9 wickets
Yeonhui Cricket Ground, Incheon
Umpires: Mohammed Kamruzzaman (THA) and Buddhi Pradhan (NEP)

- Pakistan won the toss and elected to field.

25 September
14:00
Scorecard

Bangladesh; 95/4 (20 overs)	v	Sri Lanka; 70 (18.2 overs)
Lata Mondal 34* (43); Chandima Gunaratne 1/10 (4 overs)		Shashikala Siriwardene 15 (27); Panna Ghosh 5/10 (4 overs)

Bangladesh won by 25 runs
Yeonhui Cricket Ground, Incheon
Umpires: Riaz Chaudhry (KUW) and Sarika Prasad (SIN)

- Bangladesh won the toss and elected to bat.

==== Bronze medal match ====
26 September
9:30
Scorecard

China; 65/6 (20 overs)	v	Sri Lanka; 66/5 (17.1 overs)
Yu Miao 26* (47); Maduri Samuddika 2/5 (4 overs)		Chamari Athapaththu 16 (23); Song Fengfeng 2/8 (2 overs)

Sri Lanka won by 5 wickets
Yeonhui Cricket Ground, Incheon
Umpires: Riaz Chaudhry (KUW) and Mohammed Kamruzzaman (THA)

- China won the toss and elected to bat.

==== Final ====
26 September
14:00
Scorecard

Pakistan; 97/6 (20 overs)	v	Bangladesh; 38/9 (7 overs)
Bismah Maroof 24 (27); Rumana Ahmed 2/13 (4 overs)		Fargana Hoque 10 (9); Sadia Yousuf, Nida Dar 2/2 (1 over)

Pakistan won by 4 runs (D/L method)
Yeonhui Cricket Ground, Incheon
Umpires: Ramani Batumalai (MAS) and Sarika Prasad (SIN)

- Pakistan won the toss and elected to bat.
- Bangladesh were set a revised target of 43 runs from 7 overs due to rain.

== Final standing ==
Rank	Team	Pld	W	L	T	NR
1st place, gold medalist(s)	Pakistan	3	3	0	0	0
2nd place, silver medalist(s)	Bangladesh	3	2	1	0	0
3rd place, bronze medalist(s)	Sri Lanka	3	2	1	0	0
4	China	5	3	2	0	0
5	Hong Kong	3	1	2	0	0
5	Japan	1	0	1	0	0
5	Nepal	3	1	2	0	0
5	Thailand	3	2	1	0	0
9	Malaysia	2	0	2	0	0
9	South Korea	2	0	2	0	0
