= 2012 Women's Twenty20 Asia Cup =

Cricket tournament in China

Women's Twenty20 Asia Cup
- Dates: 24 – 31 October 2012
- Administrator: Asian Cricket Council
- Cricket format: Women's Twenty20 International and Women's Twenty20
- Tournament format: Group Stage with Finals
- Host: China
- Champions: India (5th title)
- Runners-up: Pakistan
- Participants: 8
- Matches: 15
- Player of the series: (Pakistan) Bismah Maroof
- Most runs: (Pakistan) Bismah Maroof (113)
- Official website: Tournament Site

The 2012 Women's Twenty20 Asia Cup was the fifth edition of the ACC Women's Asia Cup and the first edition played in the Women's Twenty20 cricket format as all four previous editions were contested in the Women's One Day International cricket format. It was organized by the Asian Cricket Council and the tournament took place at Guangzhou, China. All the matches were played at the Guanggong International Cricket Stadium, the venue for the cricket tournament in 2010 Asian Games. Eight teams competed in the tournament which was played from 24 to 31 October 2012.

== Format ==
The teams were divided into two groups where matches were played in a round-robin format. The two best placed teams from each group progressed to the two-round knock-out stage.

Group A	Group B
Pakistan	Bangladesh
India	Sri Lanka
Thailand	Nepal
Hong Kong	China

== Squads ==
Bangladesh	China	Hong Kong	India	Nepal	Pakistan	Sri Lanka	Thailand
Salma Khatun (c); Shukhtara Rahman (vc); Fargana Hoque; Jahanara Alam; Khadija Tul Kubra; Lata Mondal; Lily Rani Biswas; Nuzhat Tasnia; Panna Ghosh; Ritu Moni; Rumana Ahmed; Sanjida Islam; Shamima Sultana (wk); Sharmin Akhter; Tazia Akhter	Wang Meng (c); Han Lili; Huang Zhuo; Liu Xiaonan; Sun Huan; Sun Meng Yao; Wu Di; Wu Juan; Yang Yu Xuan; Yu Miao; Zhang Mei; Zhao Ning; Zheng Lili; Zhou Haijie; Zou Miao	Ishitaa Gidwani (c); Mariko Hill (vc); Kary Chan; Betty Chan; Charlotte Chan; Annie Ho; Jaswinder Kaur; Amanda Kwok; Emma Lai; Godiva Li; Dominique McCusker; Shanzeen Shahzad; Natural Yip (wk); Alvina Tam; Yee Shan To	Mithali Raj (c); Harmanpreet Kaur (vc); Ekta Bisht; Archana Das; Jhulan Goswami; Reema Malhotra; Mona Meshram; Sulakshana Naik (wk); Niranjana Nagarajan; Rasanara Parwin; Anuja Patil; Punam Raut; Amita Sharma; Shubhlakshmi Sharma; Sunitha Anand	Rubina Chhetri (c); Indu Barma; Mamta Chaudhary; Rashmi Chaulagain; Karuna Bhandari; Sonu Khadka; Sita Rana Magar; Sarita Magar; Mamata Thapa (wk); Neri Thapa; Neera Rajopadhyay; Rekha Rawal; Bohara Roshani; Sobha Aale; Trishna Singh	Sana Mir (c); Asmavia Iqbal; Batool Fatima (wk); Bismah Maroof; Javeria Khan; Javeria Rauf; Mariam Hasan; Marina Iqbal; Nahida Khan; Nain Abidi; Nida Dar; Qanita Jalil; Rabiya Shah; Sadia Yousuf; Sumaiya Siddiqi	Shashikala Siriwardene (c); Sandamali Dolawatte (vc); Chamari Atapattu; Inoka Galagedara; Eshani Kaushalya; Yashoda Mendis; Udeshika Prabodhani; Inoka Ranaweera; Deepika Rasangika; Sharina Ravikumar; Maduri Samuddika; Chamani Seneviratne; Dilani Manodara (wk); Sripali Weerakkody; Prasadani Weerakkody	Sornnarin Tippoch (c) & (wk); Nattaya Boochatham; Naruemol Chaiwai; Natthakan Chantam; Premwadee Doungsin; Maneewan Jala; Phira-on Khamla; Nantanit Konchan; Siwaporn Kosathong; Suleeporn Laomi; Ratanaporn Padunglerd; Pundarika Prathanmitr; Sirintra Saengsakaorat; Rattana Sangsoma; Chanida Sutthiruang

== Results ==
All times shown are in China Standard Time (UTC+08:00).

=== Group stage ===
==== Group A ====
Pos	Team	Pld	W	L	NR	Pts	NRR
1	India	3	3	0	0	6	3.824
2	Pakistan	3	2	1	0	4	3.906
3	Thailand	3	1	2	0	2	−2.767
4	Hong Kong	3	0	3	0	0	−4.867

Source: ESPNcricinfo

24 October
10:00
Scorecard

Pakistan; 129/7 (20 overs)	v	Thailand; 32 (15.1 overs)
Javeria Khan 33 (25); Somnarin Tippoch 1/16 (2 overs)		Phira-on Khamla 4 (6); Marina Iqbal 5/10 (3 overs)

Pakistan won by 97 runs
Guanggong International Cricket Stadium, Guangzhou
Umpires: Sarika Prasad (SGP) and Sun Jianxin (CHN)
Player of the match: Marina Iqbal (PAK)

- Thailand won the toss and elected to field.

25 October
10:00
Scorecard

India; 109/4 (20 overs)	v	Thailand; 32 (19.3 overs)
Mithali Raj 28 (30); Somnarin Tippoch 2/19 (3 overs)		Nattaya Boochatham 8 (22); Mona Meshram 2/1 (1.3 overs)

India won by 77 runs
Guanggong International Cricket Stadium, Guangzhou
Umpires: Buddhi Pradhan (NPL) and Batumalai Ramani (MYS)
Player of the match: Mithali Raj (IND)

- India won the toss and elected to bat.

26 October
14:00
Scorecard

India; 166/3 (20 overs)	v	Hong Kong; 24 (16.4 overs)
Harmanpreet Kaur 61 (38); Charlotte Chan 1/28 (4 over)		Ishitaa Gidwani 7 (17); Jhulan Goswami 2/1 (3 overs)

India won by 142 runs
Guanggong International Cricket Stadium, Guangzhou
Umpires: Liu Jingming (CHN) and Buddhi Pradhan (NPL)
Player of the match: Harmanpreet Kaur (IND)

- India won the toss and elected to bat.

27 October
14:00
Scorecard

Pakistan; 157/7 (20 overs)	v	Hong Kong; 15 (13.1 overs)
Bismah Maroof 34 (33); Betty Chan 3/26 (4 overs)		Mariko Hill 3 (7); Nida Dar 3/0 (1.1 overs)

Pakistan won by 142 runs
Guanggong International Cricket Stadium, Guangzhou
Umpires: Batumalai Ramani (MYS) and Sun Jianxin (CHN)
Player of the match: Nida Dar (PAK)

- Pakistan won the toss and elected to bat.

28 October
14:00
Scorecard

Pakistan; 93 (19.3 overs)	v	India; 94/2 (18.3 overs)
Marina Iqbal 22 (31); Archana Das 2/12 (4 overs)		Mithali Raj 36* (38); Mariam Hasan 2/15 (4 overs)

India won by 8 wickets
Guanggong International Cricket Stadium, Guangzhou
Umpires: Sarika Prasad (SGP) and Buddhi Pradhan (NPL)
Player of the match: Mithali Raj (IND)

- Pakistan won the toss and elected to bat.

29 October
14:00
Scorecard

Thailand; 83/9 (20 overs)	v	Hong Kong; 75/4 (20 overs)
Somnarin Tippoch 23 (26); Ishitaa Gidwani 3/3 (4 overs)		Natural Yip 21 (58); Chanida Sutthiruang 2/13 (3 overs)

Thailand won by 8 runs
Guanggong International Cricket Stadium, Guangzhou
Umpires: Sun Jianxin (CHN) and Liu Jingmin (CHN)
Player of the match: Somnarin Tippoch (HKG)

- Hong Kong won the toss and elected to field.

==== Group B ====
Pos	Team	Pld	W	L	NR	Pts	NRR
1	Bangladesh	3	3	0	0	6	0.713
2	Sri Lanka	3	2	1	0	4	1.287
3	China (H)	3	1	2	0	2	−0.244
4	Nepal	3	0	3	0	0	−1.777

Source: ESPNcricinfo
(H) Host

24 October
14:00
Scorecard

Bangladesh; 64/4 (19.1 overs)	v	China; 63/6 (20 overs)
Sharmin Akhter 27* (42); Zhou Haijie 2/8 (4 overs)		Sun Huan 29 (39); Panna Ghosh 2/11 (4 overs)

Bangladesh won by 6 wickets
Guanggong International Cricket Stadium, Guangzhou
Umpires: Buddhi Pradhan (NPL) and Sanjay Sarda (THA)
Player of the match: Salma Khatun (BAN)

- China won the toss and elected to bat.

25 October
14:00
Scorecard

Nepal; 58/9 (20 overs)	v	Sri Lanka; 78/8 (20 overs)
Sita Rana Magar 9 (16); Shashikala Siriwardene 2/8 (4 overs)		Shashikala Siriwardene 23 (33); Rubina Chhetry 4/7 (4 overs)

Sri Lanka won by 20 runs
Guanggong International Cricket Stadium, Guangzhou
Umpires: Sarika Prasad (SGP) and Sanjay Sarda (THA)
Player of the match: Shashikala Siriwardene (SRI)

- Sri Lanka won the toss and elected to bat.

26 October
10:00
Scorecard

Bangladesh; 46/1 (10.3 overs)	v	Nepal; 45 (19.3 overs)
Sharmin Akhter 21* (35); Karuna Bhandari 1/8 (2.3 overs)		Nary Thapa 12* (23); Rumana Ahmed 2/8 (3 overs)

Bangladesh won by 9 wickets
Guanggong International Cricket Stadium, Guangzhou
Umpires: Batumalai Ramani (MYS) and Sanjay Sarda (THA)
Player of the match: Lata Mondal (BAN)

- Bangladesh won the toss and elected to field.

27 October
10:00
Scorecard

China; 52/9 (20 overs)	v	Sri Lanka; 54/1 (5.3 overs)
Liu Xiaonan 16 (38); Maduri Samuddika 2/14 (4 overs)		Chamari Atapattu 35* (20); Yu Miao 1/12 (1 overs)

Sri Lanka won by 9 wickets
Guanggong International Cricket Stadium, Guangzhou
Umpires: Sarika Prasad (SGP) and Sanjay Sarda (THA)
Player of the match: Chamari Atapattu

- Sri Lanka won the toss and elected to field.

28 October
10:00
Scorecard

Bangladesh; 62 (18 overs)	v	Sri Lanka; 57 (19.4 overs)
Rumana Ahmed 25* (33); Sandamali Dolawatta 3/0 (1 overs)		Sandamali Dolawatta 15 (32); Salma Khatun 4/6 (3.4 overs)

Bangladesh won by 5 runs
Guanggong International Cricket Stadium, Guangzhou
Umpires: Batumalai Ramani (MYS) and Sanjay Sarda (THA)
Player of the match: Salma Khatun (BAN)

- Sri Lanka won the toss and elected to field.
- T20I debut: Panna Ghosh (BAN).

29 October
10:00
Scorecard

China; 92/2 (20 overs)	v	Nepal; 47 (19 overs)
Zhang Mei 44* (60); Neera Rajopadhyay 1/13 (4 overs)		Sarita Magar 10 (18); Zhou Haijie 2/8 (3 overs)

China won by 45 runs
Guanggong International Cricket Stadium, Guangzhou
Umpires: Batumalai Ramani (MYS) and Bisrit Giri (THA)

- Nepal won the toss and elected to field.

=== Knockout stage ===
Semifinals
A1	India
B2	Sri Lanka
A2	Pakistan	83/4 (17.4 overs)
B1	Bangladesh	82/7 (20 overs)

Finals
SF1	India	81 (20 overs)
SF2	Pakistan	63 (19.1 overs)

==== Semi-finals ====
30 October
10:00
Scorecard

India	v	Sri Lanka

Match abandoned
Guanggong International Cricket Stadium, Guangzhou
Umpires: Liu Jingming (CHN) and Buddhi Pradhan (NPL)

- No toss.
- Match abandoned without a ball bowled due to rain. For having more points at the group stage, India Women advanced to Final.

30 October
14:00
Scorecard

Bangladesh; 82/7 (20 overs)	v	Pakistan; 83/4 (17.4 overs)
Fargana Hoque 28 (44); Bismah Maroof 2/9 (2 overs)		Bismah Maroof 27* (45); Panna Ghosh 1/7 (3 overs)

Pakistan won by 6 wickets
Guanggong International Cricket Stadium, Guangzhou
Umpires: Sarika Prasad (SGP) and Batumalai Ramani (MYS)
Player of the match: Nida Dar (PAK)

- Pakistan won the toss and elected to field.

==== Final ====
31 October
14:00
Scorecard

India; 81 (20 overs)	v	Pakistan; 63 (19.1 overs)
Poonam Raut 25 (28); Sana Mir 4/13 (4 overs)		Bismah Maroof 18 (32); Archana Das 2/12 (4 overs)

India won by 18 runs
Guanggong International Cricket Stadium, Guangzhou
Umpires: Sarika Prasad (SGP) and Buddhi Pradhan (NPL)
Player of the match: Poonam Raut (IND)

- India won the toss and elected to bat.
