= 2013 Women's World Twenty20 Qualifier =

International cricket tournament

- Dates: 23 July – 1 August 2013
- Administrator: International Cricket Council
- Cricket format: 20 overs, Twenty20 International
- Host: Ireland (Note: Cricket in Ireland is organised on an All-Ireland basis, with tournaments awarded to Ireland as a whole (represented by Cricket Ireland), rather than separately to Northern Ireland and the Republic of Ireland (as in, for example, football). All matches in this tournament, however, were played in the Republic of Ireland.)
- Champions: Pakistan (shared); Sri Lanka (shared)
- Participants: 8
- Matches: 20
- Most runs: (Ireland) Clare Shillington (201)
- Most wickets: (Zimbabwe) Sharyce Saili (7) (Netherlands) Leonie Bennett (7)

The 2013 ICC Women's World Twenty20 Qualifier was an international cricket tournament held in Dublin, Ireland, from 23 July to 1 August 2013. The tournament was the inaugural edition of the Women's World Twenty20 Qualifier, with the top three teams advancing to the 2014 World Twenty20 in Bangladesh.

Eight teams played in the tournament. The host, Ireland, was joined by the two lowest-placed teams from the 2012 World Twenty20, Pakistan and Sri Lanka, as well as five teams from regional qualifying tournaments. Pakistan and Sri Lanka both went on to be undefeated at the tournament, sharing the title after the final was affected by rain and despite extension to a second day Sri Lanka's innings could not start. Ireland defeated the Netherlands in the third-place playoff to also qualify for the World Twenty20.

== Qualification and format ==
Originally, the ICC had determined that only the winner of the tournament would qualify for the World Twenty20, with that tournament then having only eight teams. This decision was altered at the 2013 International Cricket Council (ICC) annual conference in June 2013, as part of a concerted effort to support women's cricket. The eight teams at the qualifier were divided into two groups based on their ranking, with the four teams that failed to make the semi-finals going on to participate in a repêchage tournament (the Shield).

Team	Qualification
Canada	2012 Americas T20 Championship – first place
Ireland	Host
Japan	2012 East Asia-Pacific Championship – first place
Netherlands	2012 Europe T20 Qualifier – first place
Pakistan	2012 World Twenty20 – relegated
Sri Lanka	2012 World Twenty20 – relegated
Thailand	2013 ACC Women's Championship – first place
Zimbabwe	2012 Africa T20 Championship – first place

== Squads ==
Canada	Ireland	Japan	Netherlands
Mikaela Turik (c); Jenna Bartholemew; Christine Blackadder; Kim Coulter; Lorraine Kenton; Mahewish Khan; Kamna Mirchandani; Monali Patel; Saniyah Zia; Durriya Shabbir; Suthershini Sivanantham; Sheryl Tittlemier; Vijayani Vithanage; Jo White	Isobel Joyce (c); Laura Delany; Kim Garth; Cecelia Joyce; Shauna Kavanagh; Amy Kenealy; Louise McCarthy; Lucy O'Reilly; Una Raymond-Hoey; Eimear Richardson; Melissa Scott-Hayward; Clare Shillington; Elena Tice; Mary Waldron	Shizuka Miyaji (c); Erika Ida; Miho Kanno; Etsuko Kobayashi; Shizuka Kubota; Ayako Nakayama; Kurumi Ota; Chihiro Sakamoto; Atsuoko Suda; Manami Takada; Eri Yamaguchi; Mariko Yamamoto; Mai Yanagida; Yuka Yoshida	Denise Hannema (c); Leonie Bennett; Marloes Braat; Laura Brouwers; Shasha Brüning; Esther de Lange; Hannah Hofman; Lisa Klokgieters; Mariska Kornet; Helmien Rambaldo; Heather Siegers; Tessa van der Gun; Cher van Slobbe; Miranda Veringmeier
Pakistan	Sri Lanka	Thailand	Zimbabwe
Sana Mir (c); Bismah Maroof (vc); Asmavia Iqbal; Batool Fatima; Iram Javed; Javeria Khan; Javeria Rauf; Nahida Khan; Nain Abidi; Nida Dar; Qanita Jalil; Rabiya Shah; Sadia Yousuf; Sumaiya Siddiqi	Shashikala Siriwardene (c); Eshani Lokusuriyage (vc); Chamari Atapattu; Nilakshi de Silva; Sandamali Dolawatte; Chandima Gunaratne; Nipuni Hansika; Yasoda Mendis; Udeshika Prabodhani; Oshadi Ranasinghe; Deepika Rasangika; Chamani Seneviratna; Dilani Manodara; Sripali Weerakkody	Sornnarin Tippoch (c); Nattaya Boochatham (vc); Naruemol Chaiwai; Natthakan Chantam; Premwadee Doungsin; Phira-on Khamla; Nantanit Konchan; Wongpaka Liengprasert; Ratanaporn Padunglerd; Pundarika Prathanmitr; Sirintra Saengsakaorat; Sainammin Saenya; Rattana Sangsoma; Chanida Sutthiruang	Ashley Burdett (c); Nonhlanhla Nyathi (vc); Christabel Chatonzwa; Tasmeen Granger; Precious Marange; Sharne Mayers; Thandolwenkosi Mlilo; Chipo Mugeri; Pellagia Mujaji; Mary-Anne Musonda; Ashley Ndiraya; Josephine Nkomo; Sharyce Saili; Loreen Tshuma

== Group stages ==
Source: ESPNcricinfo

=== Group A ===
Team	Pld	W	L	T	NR	Pts	NRR
Pakistan	3	3	0	0	0	6	+3.286
Netherlands	3	1	2	0	0	2	–0.602
Zimbabwe	3	1	2	0	0	2	–0.767
Thailand	3	1	2	0	0	2	–1.470

23 July
Scorecard

Netherlands; 95/7 (20 overs)	v	Zimbabwe; 92/9 (20 overs)

Netherlands won by 3 runs
Claremont Road, Dublin
Player of the match: Nothlanthla Nyathi (Zim)

- Zimbabwe won the toss and elected to bowl.

23 July
Scorecard

Pakistan; 145/6 (20 overs)	v	Thailand; 76/8 (20 overs)

Pakistan won by 69 runs
Claremont Road, Dublin
Player of the match: Nain Abidi (Pak)

- Pakistan won the toss and elected to bat.

25 July
Scorecard

Netherlands; 84/5 (20 overs)	v	Thailand; 85/4 (17.5 overs)

Thailand won by 6 wickets
The Vineyard, Dublin
Player of the match: Nathakan Chantham (Tha)

- Netherlands won the toss and elected to bat.

25 July
Scorecard

Pakistan; 142/4 (20 overs)	v	Zimbabwe; 70/9 (20 overs)

Pakistan won by 72 runs
The Vineyard, Dublin
Player of the match: Sana Mir (Pak)

- Pakistan won the toss and elected to bat.

27 July
Scorecard

Pakistan; 72/4 (9 overs)	v	Netherlands; 52/5 (9 overs)

Pakistan won by 20 runs
Anglesea Road, Dublin
Player of the match: Nain Abidi (Pak)

- Pakistan won the toss and elected to bat.
- The match was reduced to 9 overs per side before the start of play, due to rain.

27 July
Scorecard

Zimbabwe; 103/8 (20 overs)	v	Thailand; 74 (18.4 overs)

Zimbabwe won by 29 runs
The Vineyard, Dublin
Player of the match: Christabel Chatonzwa (Zim)

- Thailand won the toss and elected to bowl.

=== Group B ===
Source: ESPNcricinfo

Team	Pld	W	L	T	NR	Pts	NRR
Sri Lanka	3	3	0	0	0	6	+3.707
Ireland	3	2	1	0	0	4	+2.926
Canada	3	1	2	0	0	2	–2.682
Japan	3	0	3	0	0	0	–4.301

23 July
Scorecard

Ireland; 170/1 (20 overs)	v	Japan; 53 (18.2 overs)

Ireland won by 117 runs
The Vineyard, Dublin
Player of the match: Clare Shillington (Ire)

- Japan won the toss and elected to bowl.

23 July
Scorecard

Canada; 44 (17.5 overs)	v	Sri Lanka; 47/1 (6.1 overs)

Sri Lanka won by 9 wickets
The Vineyard, Dublin
Player of the match: Chandima Gunaratne (Sri)

- Canada won the toss and elected to bat.

25 July
Scorecard

Ireland; 146/7 (20 overs)	v	Canada; 69 (19.2 overs)

Ireland won by 77 runs
Anglesea Road, Dublin
Player of the match: Clare Shillington (Ire)

- Ireland won the toss and elected to bat.

25 July
Scorecard

Japan; 21 (18.1 overs)	v	Sri Lanka; 22/0 (1.4 overs)

Sri Lanka won by 10 wickets
Anglesea Road, Dublin
Player of the match: Eshani Kaushalya (Sri)

- Sri Lanka won the toss and elected to bowl.

27 July
Scorecard

Japan; 97/5 (20 overs)	v	Canada; 100/5 (19.1 overs)

Canada won by 5 wickets
The Vineyard, Dublin
Player of the match: Durriya Shabbir (Can)

- Canada won the toss and elected to bowl.

27 July
Scorecard

Ireland; 62/9 (20 overs)	v	Sri Lanka; 63/2 (14.5 overs)

Sri Lanka won by 8 wickets
Anglesea Road, Dublin
Player of the match: Sripali Weerakkody (Sri)

- Sri Lanka won the toss and elected to bowl.
- The match held Twenty20 International status.

== Shield competition ==
=== Shield semi-finals ===
29 July
Scorecard

Japan; 58 (18.4 overs)	v	Zimbabwe; 59/7 (16 overs)

Zimbabwe won by 3 wickets
Malahide, Dublin
Player of the match: Mai Yanagida (Jap)

- Zimbabwe won the toss and elected to bowl.
- By winning, Zimbabwe qualified for the Shield final.

29–30 July
Scorecard

Thailand; 92/6 (18 overs)	v	Canada; 79/8 (18 overs)

Thailand won by 13 runs
The Vineyard, Dublin
Player of the match: Chanida Sutthiruang (Tha)

- Thailand won the toss and elected to bat.
- The match was reduced to 18 overs per side before the start of play, due to rain.
- The match was scheduled for one day, but extended to two.
- By winning, Thailand qualified for the Shield final.

=== Shield third-place playoff ===
31 July – 1 August
Scorecard

Canada	v	Japan

Match abandoned
Anglesea Road, Dublin
Player of the match: not awarded

- No toss made.

=== Shield final ===
31 July
Scorecard

Zimbabwe; 85/6 (20 overs)	v	Thailand; 48/0 (7 overs)

Thailand won by 25 runs (D/L)
Anglesea Road, Dublin
Player of the match: Somnarin Tippoch (Tha)

- Zimbabwe won the toss and elected to bat.

== Main finals ==
=== Semi-finals ===
29 July
Scorecard

Ireland; 65 (19.5 overs)	v	Pakistan; 66/1 (14.1 overs)

Pakistan won by 9 wickets
Claremont Road, Dublin
Player of the match: Sadia Yousuf (Pak)

- Pakistan won the toss and elected to bowl.
- The match held Twenty20 International status.

29 July
Scorecard

Sri Lanka; 157/6 (19 overs)	v	Netherlands; 51/4 (9 overs)

Sri Lanka won by 33 runs (D/L)
Claremont Road, Dublin
Player of the match: Deepika Rasangika (Sri)

- Netherlands won the toss and elected to bowl.
- The match was reduced to 19 overs per side before the start of play, due to rain.

=== Third-place playoff ===
31 July – 1 August
Scorecard

Ireland; 136/5 (20 overs)	v	Netherlands; 134/4 (20 overs)

Ireland won by 2 runs
Claremont Road, Dublin
Player of the match: Isobel Joyce (Ire)

- Netherlands won the toss and elected to bowl.
- The match was scheduled for one day, but extended to two.
- Ireland qualified for the World Twenty20 as a result of this match.

=== Final ===
31 July – 1 August
Scorecard

Pakistan; 112/5 (20 overs)	v	Sri Lanka

No result (title shared)
Claremont Road, Dublin
Player of the match: not awarded

- Sri Lanka won the toss and elected to bowl.
- The match was scheduled for one day, but extended to two.
- The match held Twenty20 International status.
- Pakistan and Sri Lanka shared the title after the match was unable to be completed.

== Statistics ==
=== Most runs ===
The top five run scorers (total runs) are included in this table.

Player	Team	Runs	Inns	Avg	S/R	Highest	100s	50s
Clare Shillington	Ireland	201	3	100.50	144.60	114*	1	1
Helmien Rambaldo	Netherlands	103	5	25.75	95.37	58*	0	1
Bismah Maroof	Pakistan	101	3	50.50	127.84	51*	0	1
Nain Abidi	Pakistan	95	3	47.50	123.37	47	0	0
Isobel Joyce	Ireland	94	3	47.00	104.44	72*	0	1

Source: CricketArchive

=== Most wickets ===
The top five wicket takers are listed in this table, listed by wickets taken and then by bowling average.

Player	Team	Overs	Wkts	Ave	SR	Econ	BBI
Hazvinei Saili	Zimbabwe	16.0	7	13.14	13.71	5.75	3/15
Leonie Bennett	Netherlands	18.0	7	14.57	15.42	5.66	3/15
Chandima Gunaratne	Sri Lanka	10.0	6	3.00	10.00	1.80	3/6
Mai Yanagida	Japan	12.0	6	7.83	12.00	3.91	4/5
Christabel Chatonzwa	Zimbabwe	17.4	6	11.00	17.66	3.73	4/12

Source: CricketArchive

== Final standing ==
Position	Team	Status
1	Pakistan	Qualified for 2014 World Twenty20
1	Sri Lanka	Qualified for 2014 World Twenty20
3	Ireland	Qualified for 2014 World Twenty20
4	Netherlands	Relegated to regional qualifiers
5	Thailand	Relegated to regional qualifiers
6	Zimbabwe	Relegated to regional qualifiers
7	Canada	Relegated to regional qualifiers
7	Japan	Relegated to regional qualifiers
