= Khamla =

Khamla may be,

- Khamla Pinkeo
- Phira-on Khamla

== See also ==
- Khamla Khedi, Madhya Pradesh
- the supposed Khamla 'language' is just the speech of the Gowari caste.
