= Joseph White =

Joseph or Joe White may refer to:

== Academics ==
- Joseph White (orientalist) (1745–1814), Regius Professor of Hebrew at Oxford University, 1802
- Joseph White (psychologist) (1932–2017), professor of psychology and psychiatry at the University of California, Irvine
- Joe E. White (1937–2018), retired president of Carl Albert State College
- B. Joseph White (born 1947), president of University of Illinois, 2005–2009

== Arts and entertainment ==
- Joseph White (tenor) (1891–1959), Irish-American tenor
- Joseph B. White, journalist
- Joseph Blanco White (1775–1841), British poet and theologian
- Joseph Gleeson White (1851–1898), English writer on art
- José White Lafitte (1836-1913), Cuban-French violinist and composer
- Joe White (singer), (1948-2023) Jamaican singer

== Military ==
- Joseph White (Medal of Honor) (1840–?), American Civil War sailor
- Joseph Leonard Maries White (1897–1925), Canadian World War I pilot
- Joseph T. White (1961–1985), U.S. army private who apparently defected to North Korea

== Politics and government ==
- Joseph M. White (1781–1839), U.S. Delegate from Florida Territory
- Joseph L. White (died 1861), U.S. Representative from Indiana
- Joseph W. White (1822–1892), U.S. Representative from Ohio
- Giishkitawag (1838-1894), Ojibwe chief in northern Wisconsin whose English name was Joe White
- Joseph C. White (1899–1967), American politician in Massachusetts
- Joe Slade White (1950–2021), Democratic political strategist and media consultant

== Sports ==
- Joseph White (cricketer) (fl. 1806), English cricketer
- Joseph White (squash player) (born 1997), Australian squash player
- Joe White (footballer, born 1999), English footballer
- Joe White (defender, born 2002), English footballer
- Joe White (midfielder, born 2002), English footballer
- Joe White (boxer), Welsh boxer
- Jo Jo White (Joseph Henry White, 1946–2018), basketball player
- Joe White (ice hockey) (born 1988), English ice hockey goaltender

== Other people ==
- Joe White, a character from Hawaii Five-0
- Captain Joseph White, 1830 murder victim, whose death prompted a trial prosecuted by Daniel Webster
- Joseph White, first president of the South African Radio Relay League
- Joseph White (died 2011), one of the "Beatrice Six"
- Julius W. "Mr. Joe" White Sr., shoeshine man in Myrtle Beach, South Carolina, United States for whom Mr. Joe White Avenue is named

== See also ==
- Jo White (disambiguation)
- Joe Whyte (born 1961), American actor
- José White Lafitte aka Joseph White (1836–1918), Cuban composer and violinist
