= Onika =

Onika may refer to:

- Onika Maraj-Petty (born 1982), rapper and singer known professionally as Nicki Minaj
- Onika Wallerson (born 1985), American cricketer
- Joseph Onika (born 1967), Solomon Island politician
- Abbas Ali Atwi (born 1984), Lebanese footballer also known as Onika
