= Leonie Bennett =

Dutch cricketer

Personal information
- Full name: Leonie Kelly Bennett
- Born: 8 December 1993 (age 32); Rotterdam, Netherlands
- Batting: Right-handed
- Bowling: Left arm orthodox spin

International information
- National side: Netherlands
- ODI debut (cap 81): 17 August 2011 v Ireland
- Last ODI: 24 November 2011 v Ireland
- T20I debut (cap 23): 15 August 2011 v Ireland
- Last T20I: 3 September 2019 v Namibia

Career statistics
Competition	WODI	WT20I
Matches	5	1
Runs scored	2	3
Batting average	1.00	3.00
100s/50s	0/0	0/0
Top score	2*	3
Balls bowled	162	—
Wickets	4	—
Bowling average	34.25	—
5 wickets in innings	0	—
10 wickets in match	0	—
Best bowling	3/20	—
Catches/stumpings	0/–	0/–
- Source: Cricinfo, 3 September 2019

Leonie Kelly Bennett (born 8 December 1993) is a Dutch cricketer who debuted for the Dutch national side in August 2011. A left-arm orthodox spinner.

Bennett was born in Rotterdam to English parents. After playing for the Dutch under-17 side at the 2009 European Championship, she made her debut for Netherlands A in June 2010, aged only 16. Bennett made her senior debut for the Netherlands in a 20-over double header against Scotland and Ireland at the 2011 European Twenty20 Championship, although only the game against Ireland held Twenty20 International status. Aged 17 years and 250 days, she became the third-youngest Twenty20 International debutant for the Netherlands, behind Miranda Veringmeier and Denise Hannema. Bennett's ODI debut came two days later against Ireland, as part of the one-day European Championship. On debut, she was the third bowler used, after Laura Brouwers and Jolet Hartenhof, but went wicketless, conceding 26 runs from her five overs.

Retained in the Dutch squad for the 2011 World Cup Qualifier in Bangladesh, Bennett went on to play every match at the tournament, including four further ODIs. Notable performances there included 3/20 against Ireland, a match which had ODI status, and 2/11 against Zimbabwe, which did not. At the 2013 World Twenty20 Qualifier in Ireland, Bennett was the tournament's equal leading wicket-taker (alongside Zimbabwean Hazvinei Saili), finishing with seven wickets at an average of 14.57. Her best figures were 3/15 from four overs against Zimbabwe. Outside of international competition, Bennett has been a regular for the Netherlands in the English domestic competitions in which it participates, including the Women's County Championship. However, her 2014 season was curtailed by an ankle injury. Bennett's club cricket is played for SV Kampong.

In August 2019, she was named in the Dutch squad for the 2019 ICC Women's World Twenty20 Qualifier tournament in Scotland.
