= Bruining =

Bruining is a surname. Notable people with the surname include:

- Mack Bruining (born 1997), Dutch basketball player
- Nicolette Bruining (1886–1963), Dutch theologian

== See also ==
- Bruning (surname)
