= Sravanthi Naidu =

Indian cricketer (born 1986)

Personal information
- Full name: Sthalam Krishnamurth Sravanthi Naidu
- Born: 23 August 1986 (age 40); Secunderabad, Andhra Pradesh, India
- Batting: Right-handed
- Bowling: Slow left-arm orthodox
- Role: Bowler

International information
- National side: India (2005–2014)
- Only Test (cap 66): 21 November 2005 v England
- ODI debut (cap 79): 9 December 2005 v England
- Last ODI: 17 March 2009 v England
- T20I debut (cap 47): 9 March 2014 v Bangladesh
- Last T20I: 2 April 2014 v Pakistan

Domestic team information
- Years: Team
- 2001/02: Andhra
- 2006/07–2008/09: Hyderabad
- 2009/10: Railways
- 2010/11–2013/14: Hyderabad
- 2014/15: Railways
- 2015/16–2019/20: Hyderabad

Career statistics
Competition	WTest	WODI	WT20I	WLA
Matches	1	4	6	122
Runs scored	9	2	11	1,702
Batting average	9.00	1.00	11.00	27.45
100s/50s	0/0	0/0	0/0	0/3
Top score	9	2	11	66
Balls bowled	100	66	109	4,479
Wickets	2	1	9	115
Bowling average	31.00	67.00	8.33	19.60
5 wickets in innings	0	0	0	3
10 wickets in match	0	0	0	0
Best bowling	2/30	1/14	4/9	5/18
Catches/stumpings	0/–	0/–	2/–	46/–
- Source: CricketArchive, 28 August 2022

Sthalam Krishnamurth Sravanthi Naidu (born 23 August 1986) is an Indian former cricketer who played as a slow left-arm orthodox bowler. She appeared in one Test match, four One Day Internationals and six Twenty20 Internationals for India between 2005 and 2014. She played domestic cricket for Andhra, Hyderabad and Railways.

She was named in T20I squad against Bangladesh and 2014 Women's World Twenty20 in February 2014. She held for four years the record for the best bowling figures on WT20I debut, taking 4/9 against Bangladesh on 9 March 2014. The record was broken in 2018 and, as of June 2024, Sravanthi inaugural WT20I bowling figures were the 10th best debut bowling figures in WT20Is.
