= Akhona =

Akhona is a given name, derived from the Nguni word khona, meaning "presence". Notable people with the given name include:

- Akhona Kula (born 1990), South African cricketer
- Akhona Makalima (born 1988), South African soccer referee
- Akhona Mnyaka (born 1999), South African cricketer
- Akhona Nyiki (born 1992), South African cricketer
