= Breuning =

Breuning is a surname. Notable people with the surname include:

- Gerhard von Breuning (1813–1892), Austrian physician
- Olaf Breuning (born 1970), Swiss artist
- Stephan von Breuning (entomologist) (1894–1983), Austrian entomologist
- Stephan von Breuning (librettist) (1774–1827), German civil servant and librettist
- Walter Breuning (1896–2011), American supercentenarian

== See also ==
- Bruning (surname)
