= Josephine White =

Josephine White may refer to:

- Josephine Sophia White (1814–1872), American women's rights and anti-slavery activist, a/k/a Josephine White Griffing
- Josephine M. R. White (1849–1929), American physician and suffragist in Delaware, a/k/a Josephine White deLacour
- Josephine White (writer) (1862–1934), Canadian-born American author of non-fiction books, a/k/a Josephine White Bates
- Josephine White (runner) (born 1960), British runner, bronze medalist in 800 m at 1977 European Athletics Junior Championships
- Josephine White, American resident of Providence, Rhode Island 1894 historic building Josephine White Block
- Josephine White, American tennis player in first round of 1892 U.S. National Championships – Women's singles

== See also ==
- Jo White (disambiguation)
- Jojo White (disambiguation)
