= Pakistan women's cricket team in Bangladesh in 2013–14 =

History of Pakistan women's cricket team

	Bangladesh	Pakistan
- Dates: 4 – 15 March 2014
Captains	Salma Khatun	Sana Mir

One Day International series
- Results: Bangladesh won the 2-match series 2–0
Most runs	Rumana Ahmed (45)	Asmavia Iqbal (40)
Most wickets	Lata Mondal (6)	Sana Mir (5)

Twenty20 International series
- Results: Pakistan won the 2-match series 2–0
Most runs	Fargana Hoque (35)	Javeria Khan (68)
Most wickets	Panna Ghosh (3)	Asmavia Iqbal (6)

The Pakistan women's national cricket team toured Bangladesh in March 2014. They played Bangladesh in two One Day Internationals and two Twenty20 Internationals, with Bangladesh winning the ODI series 2–0 and Pakistan winning the T20I series 2–0. The tour preceded both sides' participation in the 2014 ICC Women's World Twenty20, which also took place in Bangladesh from 23 March to 6 April 2014.

== Squads ==
Bangladesh	Pakistan
Salma Khatun (c); Rumana Ahmed; Sharmin Akhter; Shohely Akhter; Jahanara Alam; Panna Ghosh; Fargana Hoque; Sanjida Islam; Fahima Khatun; Khadija Tul Kubra; Lata Mondal; Ayasha Rahman; Shaila Sharmin; Shamima Sultana; Nuzhat Tasnia (wk)	Sana Mir (c); Nain Abidi; Sidra Ameen; Anam Amin; Nida Dar; Batool Fatima (wk); Asmavia Iqbal; Marina Iqbal; Qanita Jalil; Javeria Khan; Nahida Khan; Sania Khan; Bismah Maroof; Sumaiya Siddiqi; Sadia Yousuf

== WODI Series ==
=== 1st ODI ===
4 March 2014
Scorecard

Bangladesh; 152 (49.3 overs)	v	Pakistan; 109 (44.1 overs)
Rumana Ahmed 44 (75); Qanita Jalil 3/26 (10 overs)		Asmavia Iqbal 40 (86); Lata Mondal 4/35 (8 overs)

Bangladesh Women won by 43 runs
Sheikh Kamal International Stadium, Cox's Bazar, Cox's Bazar
Umpires: Mahfuzur Rahman (Ban) and Sharfuddoula (Ban)

- Pakistan Women won the toss and elected to field.

=== 2nd ODI ===
6 March 2014
Scorecard

Pakistan; 87 (46.1 overs)	v	Bangladesh; 88/7 (34.5 overs)
Nain Abidi 28 (78); Shohely Akhter 3/13 (8 overs)		Ayasha Rahman 29 (90); Sana Mir 4/26 (10 overs)

Bangladesh Women won by 3 wickets
Sheikh Kamal International Stadium, Cox's Bazar, Cox's Bazar
Umpires: Mahfuzur Rahman (Ban) and Sharfuddoula (Ban)
Player of the match: Sana Mir (Pak)

- Pakistan Women won the toss and elected to bat.
- Sanjida Islam, Shamima Sultana (Ban) and Anam Amin (Pak) all made their WODI debuts.

== WT20I Series ==
=== 1st T20I ===
8 March 2014
Scorecard

Pakistan; 126/4 (20 overs)	v	Bangladesh; 113/6 (20 overs)
Javeria Khan 58 (55); Panna Ghosh 1/4 (2 overs)		Fargana Hoque 35 (40); Asmavia Iqbal 2/22 (4 overs)

Pakistan Women won by 13 runs
Sheikh Kamal International Stadium, Cox's Bazar, Cox's Bazar
Umpires: Mahfuzur Rahman (Ban) and Sharfuddoula (Ban)
Player of the match: Javeria Khan (Pak)

- Pakistan Women won the toss and elected to bat.
- Shamima Sultana (Ban) and Anam Amin (Pak) both made their WT20I debuts.

=== 2nd T20I ===
15 March 2014
Scorecard

Pakistan; 120/7 (20 overs)	v	Bangladesh; 86/8 (20 overs)
Nain Abidi 54 (51); Panna Ghosh 2/15 (4 overs)		Lata Mondal 19 (24); Asmavia Iqbal 4/16 (4 overs)

Pakistan Women won by 34 runs
Sheikh Kamal International Stadium, Cox's Bazar, Cox's Bazar
Umpires: Abhi Abdullah Al Noman (Ban) and Sharfuddoula (Ban)
Player of the match: Nain Abidi (Pak)

- Bangladesh Women won the toss and elected to field.

== See also ==
- 2014 ICC Women's World Twenty20
