= Kerry-Anne Tomlinson =

New Zealand cricketer (born 1990)

Personal information
- Full name: Kerry-Anne Tomlinson
- Born: 19 January 1990 (age 36); Gisborne, New Zealand
- Batting: Right handed
- Bowling: Right-arm medium
- Role: Batter

International information
- National side: Netherlands (2011)
- ODI debut (cap 82): 15 November 2011 v Sri Lanka
- Last ODI: 24 November 2011 v Ireland

Domestic team information
- Years: Team
- 2005/06–2007/08: Northern Districts
- 2008/09–2009/10: Wellington
- 2011/12: Central Districts
- 2012/13–2016/17: Northern Districts
- 2017/18–present: Central Districts
- 2018–2019: Dragons

Career statistics
Competition	WODI	WLA	WT20
Matches	4	142	91
Runs scored	77	2,450	1,190
Batting average	19.25	24.74	17.00
100s/50s	0/0	0/12	0/2
Top score	34	80	67*
Balls bowled	191	1,280	206
Wickets	2	40	13
Bowling average	82.50	24.15	19.07
5 wickets in innings	0	1	0
10 wickets in match	0	0	0
Best bowling	2/30	5/20	3/11
Catches/stumpings	3/–	47/4	21/5
- Source: CricketArchive, 8 April 2021

Kerry-Anne Tomlinson (born 19 January 1990) is a New Zealand cricketer who currently plays for Central Districts. She has also played club cricket in the Netherlands and briefly played for the Netherlands women's national cricket team.

== Personal life ==
Tomlinson was born in Gisborne. She is of Ngāti Porou/Te Whānau-ā-Apanui descent.

== Netherlands career ==
Tomlinson qualified to play for the Netherlands women's national cricket team after several seasons of club cricket in the Netherlands. She has played in four One Day International (ODI) matches at the 2011 Women's Cricket World Cup Qualifier in Bangladesh. She was named player of the match against Zimbabwe after taking 2/34 and scoring 46 not out. She returned to the Netherlands in 2022 as a player-coach for Voorburg Cricket Club.

== New Zealand career ==
In November 2016, Tomlinson became the first woman to be awarded the New Zealand Māori Cricket Scholarship. The scholarship which recognises Māori talent was awarded to Tomlinson for launching Northern Māori Women, the first women's Māori domestic cricket team in New Zealand's history.

In 2024, Tomlinson was named captain of the New Zealand Māori women's cricket team for the 2024 Women's T20I Pacific Cup.

In December 2024, she scored her maiden century in List A cricket in the 2024–25 Hallyburton Johnstone Shield.
