= Thandolwenkosi Mlilo =

Zimbabwean cricketer (born 1985)

Personal information
- Born: 16 June 1985 (age 40)
- Batting: Right-handed
- Bowling: Right-arm medium fast
- Role: All-rounder

International information
- National side: Zimbabwe
- Source: Cricinfo, 22 November 2017

Thandolwenkosi Mlilo also known as Thandakwenkosi Mlilo (born 16 June 1985) is a Zimbabwean woman cricketer. Mlilo was one of the cricketers to have played for Zimbabwe in its international debut in 2006. She represented Zimbabwe in the 2008 Women's Cricket World Cup Qualifier, 2013 ICC Women's World Twenty20 Qualifier and in the 2015 ICC Women's World Twenty20 Qualifier. In the 2008–09 season, she was awarded the Zimbabwean women's cricketer of the Year award.
