= 2014 Women's World Twenty20 =

4th edition of the Women's T20 World Cup

- Dates: 23 March – 6 April 2014
- Administrator: International Cricket Council
- Cricket format: Women's Twenty20 International
- Tournament format(s): Group stage and Knockout
- Host: Bangladesh
- Champions: Australia (3rd title)
- Runners-up: England
- Participants: 10
- Matches: 27
- Player of the series: (England) Anya Shrubsole
- Most runs: (Australia) Meg Lanning (257)
- Most wickets: (England) Anya Shrubsole (13)
- Official website: iccworldtwenty20.com

The 2014 Women's World Twenty20 was the fourth Women's World Twenty20 competition, taking place in Bangladesh from 23 March to 6 April 2014. The tournament was played in the cities of Sylhet and Dhaka – Cox's Bazar was originally intended to also host matches, but the venue was not available due to ongoing development. The tournament featured 10 teams, rather than the eight at previous tournaments, with all matches in the tournament accorded women's Twenty20 International (T20I) status. Bangladesh and Ireland made their first appearances at the event, which was run concurrently with the men's tournament. Australia won the tournament, beating England in the final by six wickets.

== Logo ==
On 6 April 2013, the ICC unveiled the logo for the tournament at a gala event in Dhaka. The logo uses the colours of the Bangladesh flag with splashes of blue representing the country's iconic waterways (also representing the blue in the ICC logo). The logo is also inspired by the unique painted rickshaws which pack the streets of the Bangladesh cities. The T is made up of cricket stumps and the "0" in the T20 represents the cricket ball complete with Bangladeshi green seam while the white in the design lends an energetic, friendly and youthful feel to the logo.

== Teams ==
For the first time the tournament had 10 teams. The top six teams from the 2012 ICC World Twenty20 and hosts Bangladesh automatically qualified for the tournament. Three additional teams qualified for the tournament through the 2013 ICC Women's World Twenty20 Qualifier.

Top 6 from 2012 ICC Women's World Twenty20

- Australia
- England
- India
- New Zealand
- South Africa
- West Indies

Top 3 from 2013 ICC Women's World Twenty20 Qualifier

- Ireland
- Pakistan
- Sri Lanka

Hosts

- Bangladesh

== Venues ==
2014 ICC Women's World Twenty20 venues

The 2014 ICC Women's World Twenty20 hosted a total of 25 matches. The BKSP Grounds in Savar hosted practice matches. The group stage matches were held at the Sylhet Divisional Stadium, Sylhet, while the semi-finals and the final were held at the Sher-e-Bangla National Cricket Stadium, Mirpur, Dhaka.

Bangladesh
Dhaka	Sylhet
Sher-e-Bangla National Cricket Stadium	Sylhet Divisional Stadium
Coordinates:23°48′24.95″N 90°21′48.87″E	Coordinates:24°55′14.81″N 91°52′07.15″E
Capacity: 26,000	Capacity: 18,500

== Warm-up matches ==
A total of 10 warm-up matches were played between 18 and 21 March, featuring all 10 teams at the Bangladesh Krira Shikkha Protisthan Grounds in Savar. Pakistan and India also played a number of Twenty20 International matches against Bangladesh prior to the official warm-up matches.

Fixtures

18 March
09:30
Scorecard

Australia; 144/5 (20 overs)	v	Sri Lanka; 125/5 (20 overs)
Meg Lanning 43 (38); Chandima Gunaratne 3/27 (4 overs)		Shashikala Siriwardene 39* (38); Jess Jonassen 2/5 (3 overs)

Australia Women won by 19 runs
Bangladesh Krira Shikkha Protisthan Ground, Savar
Umpires: Sharfuddoula and Tanvir Ahmed

- Sri Lanka Women won the toss and elected to field.

18 March
09:30
Report

England; 107/8 (19.5 overs)	v	Pakistan; 106/6 (20 overs)
Lydia Greenway 34 (37); Sumaiya Siddiqi 3/14 (4 overs)		Sana Mir 36 (32); Danielle Hazell 2/3 (2 overs)

England Women won by 2 wickets
Bangladesh Krira Shikkha Protisthan Ground, Savar
Umpires: Sharfuddoula and Tanvir Ahmed

- Pakistan Women won the toss and elected to bat.

18 March
13:30
Scorecard

India; 121/8 (20 overs)	v	New Zealand; 138/8 (20 overs)
Mithali Raj 53 (47); Morna Nielsen 3/9 (4 overs)		Katie Perkins 40 (36); Jhulan Goswami 3/15 (4 overs)

New Zealand Women won by 17 runs
Bangladesh Krira Shikkha Protisthan Ground, Savar
Umpires: A. F. M. Akhtaruddin and Morshed Ali Khan

- India Women won the toss and elected to field.

18 March
13:30
Scorecard

South Africa; 71 (18.5 overs)	v	West Indies; 123/4 (20 overs)
Yolandi van der Westhuizen 24 (39); Anisa Mohammed 2/6 (3 overs)		Stafanie Taylor 45* (51); Shabnim Ismail 2/12 (4 overs)

West Indies Women won by 52 runs
Bangladesh Krira Shikkha Protisthan Ground, Savar
Umpires: A. F. M. Akhtaruddin and Morshed Ali Khan

- West Indies Women won the toss and elected to bat.

20 March
09:30
Scorecard

Bangladesh; 76/6 (20 overs)	v	Pakistan; 81 (19.5 overs)
Ayasha Rahman 28 (45); Asmavia Iqbal 3/8 (4 overs)		Nahida Khan 30 (29); Salma Khatun 3/11 (3.5 overs)

Pakistan Women won by 5 runs
Bangladesh Krira Shikkha Protisthan Ground, Savar
Umpires: Anisur Rahman and Tanvir Ahmed

- Bangladesh Women won the toss and elected to field

20 March
13:30
Scorecard

Ireland; 121/9 (20 overs)	v	Sri Lanka; 170/5 (20 overs)
Cecelia Joyce 41 (34); Inoka Ranaweera 2/11 (3 overs)		Shashikala Siriwardene 50* (28); Elena Tice 1/25 (3 overs)

Sri Lanka Women won by 49 runs
Bangladesh Krira Shikkha Protisthan Ground, Savar
Umpires: A. F. M. Akhtaruddin and Morshed Ali Khan

- Ireland Women won the toss and elected to field.

21 March
09:30
Scorecard

Australia; 128/7 (20 overs)	v	West Indies; 144/3 (20 overs)
Delissa Kimmince 26 (31); Anisa Mohammed 3/25 (4 overs)		Deandra Dottin 78* (48); Jess Jonassen 2/24 (4 overs)

West Indies Women won by 16 runs
Bangladesh Krira Shikkha Protisthan Ground, Savar
Umpires: Enamul Haque and Sharfuddoula

- Australia Women won the toss and elected to field.

21 March
09:30
Scorecard

England; 49/2 (9.2 overs)	v	New Zealand; 48 (15.2 overs)
Charlotte Edwards 21 (17); Sophie Devine 1/6 (1 over)		Katie Perkins 15 (24); Anya Shrubsole 4/10 (4 overs)

England Women won by 8 wickets
Bangladesh Krira Shikkha Protisthan Ground, Savar
Umpires: Enamul Haque and Sharfuddoula

- England Women won the toss and elected to field.

21 March
13:30
Scorecard

Bangladesh; 85/8 (20 overs)	v	South Africa; 88/2 (15.3 overs)
Shaila Sharmin 21 (20); Suné Luus 1/5 (2 overs)		Lizelle Lee 50* (45); Khadija Tul Kubra 1/16 (4 overs)

South Africa Women won by 8 wickets
Bangladesh Krira Shikkha Protisthan Ground, Savar
Umpires: Anisur Rahman and Morshed Ali Khan

- South Africa Women won the toss and elected to field.

21 March
09:30
Scorecard

India; 148/4 (20 overs)	v	Ireland; 122/9 (20 overs)
Poonam Raut 50* (40); Elena Tice 1/24 (4 overs)		Clare Shillington 47 (43); Shikha Pandey 3/24 (4 overs)

India Women won by 26 runs
Bangladesh Krira Shikkha Protisthan Ground, Savar
Umpires: Anisur Rahman and Morshed Ali Khan

- Ireland Women won the toss and elected to field.

== Group stage ==
Each team played every other team in its group with all group stage matches being played at the Sylhet Divisional Stadium in Sylhet. The top four teams from each group qualified for the knockout phase and the 2016 ICC Women's World Twenty20. The third and fourth placed teams from each group participated in a play-off for automatic qualification for the 2016 ICC Women's World Twenty20.

=== Group A ===
Pos	Team	Pld	W	L	NR	Pts	NRR
1	Australia	4	3	1	0	6	2.205
2	South Africa	4	3	1	0	6	1.606
3	New Zealand	4	3	1	0	6	1.275
4	Pakistan	4	1	3	0	2	−2.287
5	Ireland	4	0	4	0	0	−2.750

Source: ESPNCricinfo

Advanced to Knockout stage.
Advanced to Qualification play-offs for 2016 ICC Women's World Twenty20.
Advanced to 9th-place play-off.

23 March
15:30 (D/N)
Scorecard

Australia; 121 (19.3 overs)	v	New Zealand; 128/8 (20 overs)
Alyssa Healy 41 (41); Holly Huddleston 2/23 (4 overs)		Katie Perkins 31 (36); Sarah Coyte 2/8 (3 overs)

New Zealand won by 7 runs
Sylhet Stadium, Sylhet
Umpires: Marais Erasmus (SA) and Ian Gould (Eng)
Player of the match: Nicola Browne (NZ)

- Australia Women won the toss and elected to field.

23 March
19:30 (D/N)
Scorecard

Pakistan; 119/9 (20 overs)	v	South Africa; 163/0 (20 overs)
Nida Dar 32 (26); Marizanne Kapp 3/16 (4 overs)		Dane van Niekerk 90* (66)

South Africa Women won by 44 runs
Sylhet Stadium, Sylhet
Umpires: Steve Davis (Aus) and Bruce Oxenford (NZ)
Player of the match: Dane van Niekerk (SA)

- Pakistan Women won the toss and elected to field.

25 March
15:30 (D/N)
Scorecard

Ireland; 129/5 (20 overs)	v	New Zealand; 171/3 (20 overs)
Cecelia Joyce 39* (28); Morna Nielsen 2/23 (4 overs)		Suzie Bates 68 (51); Eimear Richardson 2/32 (4 overs)

New Zealand Women won by 42 runs
Sylhet Stadium, Sylhet
Umpires: Marais Erasmus (SA) and Ian Gould (Eng)
Player of the match: Suzie Bates (NZ)

- New Zealand Women won the toss and elected to bat.

25 March
19:30 (D/N)
Scorecard

Australia; 116/4 (18.4 overs)	v	South Africa; 115/9 (20 overs)
Ellyse Perry 41* (29); Shabnim Ismail 1/12 (3 overs)		Trisha Chetty 30 (28); Julie Hunter 2/13 (4 overs)

Australia Women won by 6 wickets
Sylhet Stadium, Sylhet
Umpires: Billy Bowden (NZ) and Ranmore Martinesz (SL)
Player of the match: Ellyse Perry (Aus)

- South Africa Women won the toss and elected to bat.

27 March
15:30 (D/N)
Scorecard

Australia; 191/4 (20 overs)	v	Ireland; 113/7 (20 overs)
Meg Lanning 126 (65); Elena Tice 1/25 (4 overs)		Isobel Joyce 28 (35); Ellyse Perry 2/17 (3 overs)

Australia Women won by 78 runs
Sylhet Stadium, Sylhet
Umpires: Billy Bowden (NZ) and S. Ravi (Ind)
Player of the match: Meg Lanning (Aus)

- Australia Women won the toss and elected to bat.

27 March
19:30 (D/N)
Scorecard

New Zealand; 167/3 (20 overs)	v	Pakistan; 108/7 (20 overs)
Suzie Bates 94* (61); Sadia Yousuf 2/24 (4 overs)		Javeria Khan 35 (41); Felicity Leydon-Davis 2/15 (4 overs)

New Zealand Women won by 59 runs
Sylhet Stadium, Sylhet
Umpires: Ranmore Martinesz (SL) and Paul Reiffel (Aus)
Player of the match: Suzie Bates (NZ)

- New Zealand Women won the toss and elected to bat.

29 March
15:30 (D/N)
Scorecard

Ireland; 79 (19.5 overs)	v	South Africa; 165/5 (20 overs)
Mary Waldron 33 (30); Shabnim Ismail 3/5 (3 overs)		Lizelle Lee 43 (40); Amy Kenealy 1/26 (4 overs); Isobel Joyce 1/26 (4 overs)

South Africa Women won by 86 runs
Sylhet Stadium, Sylhet
Umpires: Richard Illingworth (Eng) and Paul Reiffel (Aus)
Player of the match: Chloe Tryon (SA)

- South Africa Women won the toss and elected to bat.

29 March
19:30 (D/N)
Scorecard

Australia; 185/2 (20 overs)	v	Pakistan; 91/9 (20 overs)
Elyse Villani 90* (54); Asmavia Iqbal 1/23 (4 overs)		Bismah Maroof 28 (35); Ellyse Perry 3/12 (4 overs)

Australia Women won by 94 runs
Sylhet Stadium, Sylhet
Umpires: Nigel Llong (Eng) and S. Ravi (Ind)
Player of the match: Elyse Villani (Aus)

- Australia Women won the toss and elected to bat.

31 March
15:30 (D/N)
Scorecard

Ireland; 105 (19.3 overs)	v	Pakistan; 119/6 (20 overs)
Isobel Joyce 32 (39); Asmavia Iqbal 3/18 (3.3 overs)		Bismah Maroof 48* (45); Louise McCarthy 2/14 (3 overs)

Pakistan Women won by 14 runs
Sylhet Stadium, Sylhet
Umpires: Billy Bowden (NZ) and Richard Illingworth (Eng)
Player of the match: Bismah Maroof (Pak)

- Pakistan Women won the toss and elected to bat.

31 March
19:30 (D/N)
Scorecard

New Zealand; 114/8 (20 overs)	v	South Africa; 116/5 (19.2 overs)
Sophie Devine 40 (43); Marizanne Kapp 3/23 (4 overs)		Mignon du Preez 51 (47); Sophie Devine 2/26 (4 overs)

South Africa Women won by 5 wickets
Sylhet Stadium, Sylhet
Umpires: Nigel Llong (Eng) and Ranmore Martinesz (SL)
Player of the match: Mignon du Preez (SA)

- New Zealand Women won the toss and elected to bat.

=== Group B ===
Pos	Team	Pld	W	L	NR	Pts	NRR
1	England	4	3	1	0	6	1.363
2	West Indies	4	3	1	0	6	0.773
3	India	4	2	2	0	4	0.781
4	Sri Lanka	4	1	3	0	2	−0.437
5	Bangladesh	4	1	3	0	2	−2.387

Source: ESPNCricinfo

Advanced to Knockout stage.
Advanced to Qualification play-offs for 2016 ICC Women's World Twenty20.
Advanced to 9th-place play-off.

24 March
15:30 (D/N)
Scorecard

England; 124/9 (20 overs)	v	West Indies; 133/7 (20 overs)
Charlotte Edwards 44 (39); Deandra Dottin 4/12 (4 overs)		Stafanie Taylor 56 (45); Nat Sciver 3/18 (3 overs)

West Indies Women won by 9 runs
Sylhet Stadium, Sylhet
Umpires: Steve Davis (Aus) and Ranmore Martinesz (SL)
Player of the match: Deandra Dottin (WI)

- England Women won the toss and elected to field.

24 March
19:30 (D/N)
Scorecard

India; 106/9 (20 overs)	v	Sri Lanka; 128/8 (20 overs)
Shikha Pandey 22 (19); Udeshika Prabodani 2/9 (4 overs)		Chamari Atapattu 43 (44); Poonam Yadav 2/20 (3 overs)

Sri Lanka Women won by 22 runs
Sylhet Stadium, Sylhet
Umpires: Billy Bowden (NZ) and Bruce Oxenford (Aus)
Player of the match: Udeshika Prabodani (SL)

- Sri Lanka Women won the toss and elected to bat.

26 March
15:30 (D/N)
Scorecard

Bangladesh; 79 (17.3 overs)	v	West Indies; 115 (20 overs)
Rumana Ahmed 26 (23); Shaquana Quintyne 3/5 (3 overs)		Deandra Dottin 34 (34); Khadija Tul Kubra 3/24 (4 overs)

West Indies Women won by 36 runs
Sylhet Stadium, Sylhet
Umpires: Billy Bowden (NZ) and Ian Gould (Eng)
Player of the match: Shaquana Quintyne (WI)

- West Indies Women won the toss and elected to bat.

26 March
19:30 (D/N)
Scorecard

England; 98/5 (18.1 overs)	v	India; 95/9 (20 overs)
Sarah Taylor 28 (29); Soniya Dabir 2/21 (4 overs)		Mithali Raj 57 (56); Anya Shrubsole 3/6 (4 overs)

England Women won by 5 wickets
Sylhet Stadium, Sylhet
Umpires: Marais Erasmus (SA) and Ranmore Martinesz (SL)
Player of the match: Anya Shrubsole (Ind)

- India Women won the toss and elected to bat.

28 March
15:30 (D/N)
Scorecard

Bangladesh; 58/9 (20 overs)	v	England; 137/5 (20 overs)
Fahima Khatun 16* (16); Danielle Hazell 3/4 (4 overs)		Charlotte Edwards 80 (69); Salma Khatun 2/26 (4 overs)

England Women won by 79 runs
Sylhet Stadium, Sylhet
Umpires: S. Ravi (Ind) and Paul Reiffel (Aus)
Player of the match: Charlotte Edwards (Eng)

- England Women won the toss and elected to bat.

28 March
19:30 (D/N)
Scorecard

Sri Lanka; 84 (16.5 overs)	v	West Indies; 87/2 (15 overs)
Yasoda Mendis 21 (17); Shanel Daley 4/15 (4 overs)		Stafanie Taylor 56* (45); Shashikala Siriwardene 1/14 (3 overs)

West Indies Women won by 8 wickets
Sylhet Stadium, Sylhet
Umpires: Richard Illingworth (Eng) and Nigel Llong (Eng)
Player of the match: Shanel Daley (WI)

- Sri Lanka Women won the toss and elected to bat.

30 March
15:30 (D/N)
Scorecard

India; 151/5 (20 overs)	v	Bangladesh; 72/8 (20 overs)
Harmanpreet Kaur 77 (59); Rumana Ahmed 2/33 (4 overs)		Salma Khatun 19 (18); Jhulan Goswami 3/11 (3 overs)

India Women won by 79 runs
Sylhet Stadium, Sylhet
Umpires: Ranmore Martinesz (SL) and Paul Reiffel (Aus)
Player of the match: Harmanpreet Kaur (Ind)

- India Women won the toss and elected to bat.

30 March
19:30 (D/N)
Scorecard

England; 86/3 (16 overs)	v	Sri Lanka; 85/9 (20 overs)
Sarah Taylor 36 (34); Shashikala Siriwardana 2/15 (4 overs)		Shashikala Siriwardana 38* (43); Anya Shrubsole 3/9 (4 overs)

England Women won by 7 wickets
Sylhet Stadium, Sylhet
Umpires: Billy Bowden (NZ) and S. Ravi (Ind)
Player of the match: Anya Shrubsole (Eng)

- Sri Lanka Women won the toss and elected to bat.

1 April
15:30 (D/N)
Scorecard

Bangladesh; 115/9 (20 overs)	v	Sri Lanka; 112/9 (20 overs)
Rumana Ahmed 41 (34); Chandima Gunaratne 2/15 (4 overs)		Yasoda Mendis 33 (33); Panna Ghosh 3/18 (4 overs)

Bangladesh Women won by 3 runs
Sylhet Stadium, Sylhet
Umpires: Nigel Llong (Eng) and S. Ravi (Ind)
Player of the match: Rumana Ahmed (Ban)

- Bangladesh Women won the toss and elected to bat.

1 April
19:30 (D/N)
Scorecard

India; 121/1 (17.4 overs)	v	West Indies; 117/7 (20 overs)
Poonam Raut 56 (52); Shakera Selman 1/21 (3 overs)		Deandra Dottin 57 (51); Harmanpreet Kaur 2/12 (3 overs)

India Women won by 9 wickets
Sylhet Stadium, Sylhet
Umpires: Richard Illingworth (Eng) and Paul Reiffel (Aus)
Player of the match: Poonam Raut (Ind)

- West Indies Women won the toss and elected to bat.

== Qualification play-offs ==
2 April
15:30 (D/N)
Scorecard

New Zealand; 135/4 (19 overs)	v	Sri Lanka; 131/7 (20 overs)
Suzie Bates 45 (31); Shashikala Siriwardene 1/19 (4 overs)		Chamari Atapattu 46 (44); Nicola Browne 2/16 (4 overs)

New Zealand Women won by 6 wickets
Sylhet Stadium, Sylhet
Umpires: Nigel Llong (Eng) and S. Ravi (Ind)
Player of the match: Rachel Priest (NZ)

- Sri Lanka Women won the toss and elected to bat.

2 April
19:30 (D/N)
Scorecard

India; 106/7 (20 overs)	v	Pakistan; 100/9 (20 overs)
Mithali Raj 39 (43); Sania Khan 3/15 (4 overs)		Nahida Khan 26 (32); Soniya Dabir 3/14 (4 overs)

India Women won by 6 runs
Sylhet Stadium, Sylhet
Umpires: Billy Bowden (NZ) and Richard Illingworth (Eng)
Player of the match: Soniya Dabir (Ind)

- India Women won the toss and elected to bat.

== Classification play-offs ==
=== 7th-place play-off ===
3 April
15:30 (D/N)
Scorecard

Pakistan; 122/5 (20 overs)	v	Sri Lanka; 108/8 (20 overs)
Bismah Maroof 62* (53); Nilakshi de Silva 2/14 (4 overs)		Eshani Kaushalya 37 (29); Sania Khan 3/24 (4 overs)

Pakistan Women won by 14 runs
Sylhet Stadium, Sylhet
Umpires: Nigel Llong (Eng) and Paul Reiffel (Aus)
Player of the match: Bismah Maroof (Pak)

- Pakistan Women won the toss and elected to bat.

=== 9th-place play-off ===
3 April
19:30 (D/N)
Scorecard

Bangladesh; 106/7 (20 overs)	v	Ireland; 89 (19.3 overs)
Sharmin Akhter 35 (46); Lucy O'Reilly 3/15 (4 overs)		Cecelia Joyce 19 (32); Panna Ghosh 3/25 (4 overs)

Bangladesh Women won by 17 runs
Sylhet Stadium, Sylhet
Umpires: Richard Illingworth (Eng) and S. Ravi (Ind)
Player of the match: Panna Ghosh (Ban)

- Bangladesh Women won the toss and elected to bat.
- Both teams were relegated to the 2015 World Twenty20 Qualifier.

== Knockout stage ==
Semifinals
A1	Australia	140/5 (20 overs)
B2	West Indies	132/4 (20 overs)
B1	England	102/1 (16.5 overs)
A2	South Africa	101 (19.5 overs)

Final
A1	Australia	106/4 (15.1 overs)
B1	England	105/8 (20 overs)

=== Semi-finals ===
Semi-final
3 April
14:30 (D/N)
Scorecard

Australia; 140/5 (20 overs)	v	West Indies; 132/4 (20 overs)
Elyse Villani 35 (32); Anisa Mohammed 2/24 (4 overs)		Deandra Dottin 40 (35); Erin Osborne 1/18 (4 overs)

Australia Women won by 8 runs
Shere Bangla National Stadium, Mirpur
Umpires: Aleem Dar (Pak) and Marais Erasmus (SA)
Player of the match: Erin Osborne (Aus)

- Australia Women won the toss and elected to bat.

Semi-final
4 April
14:30 (D/N)
Scorecard

England; 102/1 (16.5 overs)	v	South Africa; 101 (19.5 overs)
Sarah Taylor 44* (45); Suné Luus 1/15 (3 overs)		Chloe Tryon 40 (31); Anya Shrubsole 2/12 (4 overs)

England Women won by 9 wickets
Shere Bangla National Stadium, Mirpur
Umpires: Steve Davis (Aus) and Bruce Oxenford (Aus)
Player of the match: Anya Shrubsole (Eng)

- England Women won the toss and elected to field.

=== Final ===
The final was the 15th time that Australia and England had played each other across the three formats (Twenty20, One Day Internationals and Tests) in 8 months. England had won both of the recent Ashes series, and Australia defeated England in the 2012 Twenty20 World Twenty20 final (by four runs) and again at the 2013 World Cup (by two runs). During this tournament both teams had finished top of their respective pools due to their higher net run rate after they both recorded three wins and one loss.

Australia won the final after England, batting first, scored 105 runs for the loss of eight wickets in their twenty overs. Australia reached England's score during their innings in just 15.1 overs. Australia's captain Meg Lanning, top scored in the match with 44 runs from 30 balls while the best bowler was Sarah Coyte who took 3 wickets for 16 runs from her four overs, and earning the Player of the Match award in the process. England's Anya Shrubsole was named Player of the Tournament for her bowling across the tournament. It was Australia's third World Twenty20 victory in a row.

Final
6 April
14:30 (D/N)
Scorecard

England; 105/8 (20 overs)	v	Australia; 106/4 (15.1 overs)
Heather Knight 29 (24); Sarah Coyte 3/16 (4 overs)		Meg Lanning 44 (30); Nat Sciver 2/12 (2 overs)

Australia Women won by 6 wickets
Shere Bangla National Stadium, Mirpur
Attendance: 4,313
Umpires: Aleem Dar (Pak) and Marais Erasmus (SA)

- Australia Women won the toss and elected to field.

== Statistics ==
=== Most runs ===
Player	Matches	Innings	Runs	Average	SR	HS	100	50	4s	6s
(Australia) Meg Lanning	6	6	257	42.83	158.64	126	1	1	33	8
(New Zealand) Suzie Bates	5	5	228	57.00	133.33	94*	0	2	28	2
(India) Mithali Raj	5	5	208	52.00	98.11	57	0	0	24	0
(England) Charlotte Edwards	6	6	200	33.33	98.03	80	0	1	28	0
(Pakistan) Bismah Maroof	6	6	158	39.50	98.75	62*	0	1	14	0

Source: ESPNCricinfo

=== Most wickets ===
Player	Matches	Innings	Wickets	Overs	Econ.	Ave.	BBI	S/R	4WI	5WI
(England) Anya Shrubsole	6	6	13	24.0	4.08	7.53	3/6	11.0	0	0
(England) Nat Sciver	6	6	10	18.5	5.09	9.60	3/10	11.3	0	0
(Australia) Sarah Coyte	6	6	9	21.0	4.80	11.22	3/14	14.0	0	0
(Bangladesh) Salma Khatun	5	5	8	19.3	3.58	8.75	2/8	14.6	0	0
(India) Poonam Yadav	5	5	8	18.0	4.83	10.87	2/10	13.5	0	0

Source: ESPNCricinfo

== See also ==
- 2014 ICC World Twenty20
