= Sheryl Tittlemier =

Canadian cricketer (born 1974)

Personal information
- Born: 26 November 1974 (age 51); Selkirk, Manitoba, Canada
- Batting: Right-handed

International information
- National side: Canada
- Source: Cricinfo, 26 January 2018

Sheryl Tittlemier (born 26 November 1974) is a Canadian woman cricketer. She played for Canada at the 2013 ICC Women's World Twenty20 Qualifier.

She was a ballplayer and got into the national team in 2008 during a 13-day tour to Trinidad and Tobago in 2008. She was part of the Canadian team which lost to United States in the 2010 ICC Americas Qualifier final by 7 wickets.
