= Triholder Marshall =

Guyanese-born American cricketer (born 1987)

Personal information
- Born: May 25, 1987 (age 37); Georgetown, Guyana
- Nickname: Tri

International information
- National side: United States
- Source: Cricinfo, 25 December 2017

Triholder Marshall (born 25 May 1987) is a Guyana born American woman cricketer. She made her international debut at the 2011 Women's Cricket World Cup Qualifier.
