= India women's cricket team in Bangladesh in 2013–14 =

Indian women's cricket team in Bangladesh in 2013–14
	Bangladesh	India
- Dates: 9 – 13 March 2014
Captains	Salma Khatun	Mithali Raj

Twenty20 International series
- Results: India won the 3-match series 3–0
Most runs	Salma Khatun (49)	Mithali Raj (55)
Most wickets	Jahanara Alam (2)	Sravanthi Naidu (7)

The India women's national cricket team toured Bangladesh in March 2014 for a three-match Twenty20 Internationals series. The visitors won the series 3–0. All the matches were played at Cox's Bazar International Cricket Stadium. The tour preceded both sides' participation in the 2014 ICC Women's World Twenty20, which was also held in Bangladesh, from 23 March to 6 April 2014.

== Squads ==
Bangladesh	India
Salma Khatun (c); Rumana Ahmed; Sharmin Akhter; Shohaly Akther; Jahanara Alam; Panna Ghosh; Farzana Hoque; Sanjida Islam; Fahima Khatun; Khadija Tul Kubra; Lata Mondal; Ayasha Rahman; Shaila Sharmin; Shamima Sultana (wk); Nuzhat Tasnia	Mithali Raj (c); Soniya Dabir; Jhulan Goswami; Karu Jain (wk); Harmanpreet Kaur; Latika Kumari; Smriti Mandhana; Madhuri Mehta; Sravanthi Naidu; Shikha Pandey; Shubhlakshmi Sharma; Gouher Sultana; Vellaswamy Vanitha; Poonam Yadav

== WT20I Series ==
=== 1st T20I ===
9 March 2014
Scorecard

India; 101/1 (20 overs)	v	Bangladesh; 85 (20 overs)
Mithali Raj 55* (64); Jahanara Alam 1/12 (3 overs)		Rumana Ahmed 21 (24); Sravanthi Naidu 4/9 (3 overs)

India Women won by 16 runs
Sheikh Kamal International Stadium, Cox's Bazar
Umpires: Mahfuzur Rahman (Ban) and Sharfuddoula (Ban)
Player of the match: Sravanthi Naidu (Ind)

- India Women won the toss and elected to bat.
- Sravanthi Naidu and Shikha Pandey (Ind) both made their WT20I debuts.

=== 2nd T20I ===
11 March 2014
Scorecard

Bangladesh; 65/9 (20 overs)	v	India; 66/2 (12.3 overs)
Fargana Hoque 18 (36); Poonam Yadav 2/9 (2 overs)		Madhuri Mehta 23 (30); Panna Ghosh 1/6 (3 overs)

India Women won by 8 wickets
Sheikh Kamal International Stadium, Cox's Bazar
Umpires: Abhi Abdullhah Al Noman (Ban) and Sharfuddoula (Ban)
Player of the match: Jhulan Goswami (Ind)

- Bangladesh Women won the toss and elected to bat.

=== 3rd T20I ===
13 March 2014
Scorecard

Bangladesh; 81/8 (20 overs)	v	India; 82/3 (16.4 overs)
Salma Khatun 34 (41); Sravanthi Naidu 3/13 (4 overs)		Latika Kumari 36 (47); Salma Khatun 1/7 (2 overs)

India Women won by 7 wickets
Sheikh Kamal International Stadium, Cox's Bazar
Umpires: Abhi Abdullhah Al Noman (Ban) and Sharfuddoula (Ban)
Player of the match: Sravanthi Naidu (Ind)

- Bangladesh Women won the toss and elected to bat.

== See also ==
- 2014 ICC Women's World Twenty20
