= Vijayani Vithanage =

Sri Lankan-born Canadian cricketer (born 1975)

Personal information
- Born: August 4, 1975 (age 50); Kurunegala, Sri Lanka
- Batting: Left-handed

International information
- National side: Canada
- Source: Cricinfo, 26 January 2018

Vijayani Vithanage (born 4 August 1975) is a Sri Lankan-born Canadian woman cricketer. She played for Canada at the 2013 ICC Women's World Twenty20 Qualifier. She represent Canada-XI in 2022 Women's South American Cricket tournament, where all the matches involving Canada did not have a T20I status.
