= Durriya Shabbir =

Indian-born Canadian cricketer (born 1967)

Personal information
- Born: 26 July 1967 (age 57); Madras, Tamil Nadu, India
- Batting: Right-handed
- Bowling: Right arm slow

International information
- National side: Canada
- Source: ESPNcricinfo, 27 January 2018

Durriya Shabbir (born 26 July 1967) is an Indian born Canadian woman cricketer. She played for Canada at the 2013 ICC Women's World Twenty20 Qualifier.

She played a key role in Canada's qualification during the 2013 ICC Women's World Twenty20 Qualifier after scoring 153 runs in the ICC Americas Qualifier tournament.
