= Lorraine Kenton =

Jamaican-born Canadian cricketer (born 1983)

Personal information
- Born: May 31, 1983 (age 41); Jamaica
- Batting: Left-handed
- Bowling: eft-arm fast

International information
- National side: Canada
- Source: Cricinfo, 21 January 2018

Lorraine Kenton (born 31 May 1983) is a Jamaican born Canadian woman cricketer. She was part of the Canadian women's cricket team at the 2013 ICC Women's World Twenty20 Qualifier.
