= Jenna Bartholemew =

South African-born Canadian cricketer

Personal information
- Born: 10 August 1988 (age 38); South Africa
- Batting: Right-handed
- Bowling: Right-arm medium

International information
- National side: Canada
- Source: Cricinfo, 25 December 2017

Jenna Bartholemew (born 10 August 1988) is a South African born Canadian woman cricketer. She made her international debut for Canada at the 2013 ICC Women's World Twenty20 Qualifier.
