= 2011 Women's Cricket World Cup Qualifier =

2011 Women's World Cup Qualifier
- Dates: 14 – 26 November 2011
- Administrator: International Cricket Council
- Cricket format: WODIs, other One Day matches
- Tournament format(s): Round robin and knockout
- Host: Bangladesh
- Champions: West Indies (1st title)
- Runners-up: Pakistan
- Participants: 10
- Matches: 31
- Player of the series: (Cricket West Indies) Stafanie Taylor
- Most runs: (Cricket West Indies) Stafanie Taylor (325)
- Most wickets: (Cricket West Indies) Anisa Mohammed (19)

The 2011 Women's Cricket World Cup Qualifier was a ten-team tournament held in Bangladesh from 14 to 26 November 2011 to decide the final four qualifiers for the 2013 Women's Cricket World Cup. Additionally, the top two teams, excluding Sri Lanka and West Indies, would qualify for the 2012 ICC Women's World Twenty20. West Indies won the tournament after defeating Sri Lanka in the semi-final and Pakistan in the final. Pakistan, as the runners-up, and South Africa who had lost in the other semi-final to Pakistan, became the other top teams to qualify for the 2012 event.

== First round ==
=== Group A ===
Team	Pld	W	L	NR	Pts	NRR
South Africa	4	4	0	0	8	+3.176
Sri Lanka	4	3	1	0	6	+1.614
Netherlands	4	2	2	0	4	–0.256
United States	4	1	3	0	2	–2.958
Zimbabwe	4	0	4	0	0	–2.669
Last updated: 11 February 2017.

14 November 2011
09:00
Scorecard

South Africa; 114 (37 overs)	v	Sri Lanka; 108 (48.2 overs)
Shandre Fritz 61 (95); Suwini de Alwis 4/21 (10 overs)		Sandamali Dolawatte 28* (104); Sunette Loubser 5/27 (10 overs)

South Africa Women won by 6 runs
Fatullah Osmani Stadium, Fatullah
Umpires: Enamul Haque (Ban) and Buddhi Pradhan (Nep)
Player of the match: Sunette Loubser (SA)

- Sri Lanka Women won the toss and elected to bat.
- Prasadani Weerakkody (SL) made her women's ODI debut.
- This was the first women's ODI match played at Fatullah Osmani Stadium.
- Sunette Loubser became the second South African bowler to take a five-wicket haul in a women's ODI match.

14 November 2011
09:00
Scorecard

Zimbabwe; 145 (49.5 overs)	v	Netherlands; 148/4 (25.2 overs)
Nonhlanhla Nyathi 29 (97); Esther Lanser 3/17 (10 overs)		Miranda Veringmeier 47 (47); Precious Marange 1/6 (1 over)

Netherlands Women won by 6 wickets
Bangladesh Krira Shikkha Protisthan No 2 Ground, Savar
Umpires: Nadir Shah (Ban) and Lakani Oala (PNG)
Player of the match: Kerry-Anne Tomlinson (Neth)

- Zimbabwe Women won the toss and elected to bat.

15 November 2011
09:00
Scorecard

Netherlands; 61 (41.3 overs)	v	Sri Lanka; 62/3 (14.2 overs)
Kerry-Anne Tomlinson 15 (104); Udeshika Prabodhani 2/6 (7 overs)		Yashoda Mendis 26 (28); Esther de Lange 1/7 (3 overs)

Sri Lanka Women won by 7 wickets
Sher-e-Bangla National Cricket Stadium, Dhaka
Umpires: Rob Bailey (Eng) and Sarika Prasad (Sin)
Player of the match: Suwini de Alwis (Sri)

- Netherlands Women won the toss and elected to bat.
- Kerry-Anne Tomlinson (Neth) made her women's ODI debut.
- The Netherlands Women first innings total of 61 is their lowest total against Sri Lanka Women and their sixth-lowest overall.

15 November 2011
09:00
Scorecard

South Africa; 343/5 (50 overs)	v	United States; 145/9 (50 overs)
Trisha Chetty 95 (104); Samantha Ramautar 2/56 (10 overs)		Joan Alexander-Serrano 29 (53); Dane van Niekerk 3/29 (10 overs)

South Africa Women won by 198 runs
Bangladesh Krira Shikkha Protisthan No 3 Ground, Savar
Umpires: Nadir Shah (Ban) and Richard Smith (Ire)
Player of the match: Trisha Chetty (SA)

- South Africa Women won the toss and elected to bat.

17 November 2011
09:00
Scorecard

Netherlands; 329/5 (50 overs)	v	United States; 104 (49.5 overs)
Miranda Veringmeier 99 (115); Claudine Beckford 2/32 (3 overs)		Shebani Bhaskar 19 (32); Esther de Lange 3/8 (10 overs)

Netherlands Women won by 225 runs
Fatullah Osmani Stadium, Fatullah
Umpires: Sarika Prasad (Sin) and Richard Smith (Ire)
Player of the match: Miranda Veringmeier (Neth)

- Netherlands Women won the toss and elected to bat.

17 November 2011
09:00
Scorecard

Zimbabwe; 62 (41.4 overs)	v	Sri Lanka; 64/3 (10.5 overs)
Nonhlanhla Nyathi 18 (114); Chamani Seneviratne 5/15 (10 overs)		Yashoda Mendis 35* (31); Sharyce Saili 3/19 (4 overs)

Sri Lanka Women won by 7 wickets
Bangladesh Krira Shikkha Protisthan No 3 Ground, Savar
Umpires: Kathy Cross (NZ) and Enamul Haque (Ban)
Player of the match: Chamani Seneviratne (SL)

- Sri Lanka Women won the toss and elected to field.

18 November 2011
09:00
Scorecard

United States; 188/8 (50 overs)	v	Zimbabwe; 187 (48.5 overs)
Shebani Bhaskar 72 (89); Sharyce Saili 2/24 (10 overs)		Christabel Chatonzwa 28* (39); Triholder Marshall 3/34 (9 overs)

United States Women won by 1 run
Sher-e-Bangla National Cricket Stadium, Dhaka
Umpires: Enamul Haque (Ban) and Sarika Prasad (Sin)
Player of the match: Shebani Bhaskar (USA)

- Zimbabwe Women won the toss and elected to field.

18 November 2011
09:00
Scorecard

South Africa; 269/5 (50 overs)	v	Netherlands; 36 (16.3 overs)
Mignon du Preez 65 (86); Esther de Lange 3/45 (10 overs)		Esther Lanser 11* (22); Shabnim Ismail 6/10 (8.3 overs)

South Africa Women won by 233 runs
Bangladesh Krira Shikkha Protisthan No 2 Ground, Savar
Player of the match: Shabnim Ismail (SA)

- South Africa Women won the toss and elected to bat.
- This was the 800th WODI match.
- Shabnim Ismail's 6/10 is the best bowling figures by a South African bowler in a WODI match.
- Netherlands Women score of 36 is their third-lowest total in a WODI match.

20 November 2011
09:00
Scorecard

Zimbabwe; 103/8 (50 overs)	v	South Africa; 106/0 (12 overs)
Ashley Ndiraya 22 (38); Sunette Loubser 5/9 (10 overs)		Shandre Fritz 69* (45)

South Africa Women won by 10 wickets
Fatullah Osmani Stadium, Fatullah
Umpires: Rob Bailey (Eng) and Kathy Cross (NZ)
Player of the match: Sunette Loubser (SA)

- South Africa Women won the toss and elected to field.
- South Africa qualified for the 2013 Women's Cricket World Cup and the 2012 ICC Women's World Twenty20.

20 November 2011
09:00
Scorecard

United States; 53 (49.4 overs)	v	Sri Lanka; 54/2 (18.5 overs)
Shebani Bhaskar 18 (31); Shashikala Siriwardene 3/9 (10 overs)		Prasadani Weerakkody 22* (53); Triholder Marshall 2/20 (6 overs)

Sri Lanka Women won by 8 wickets
Bangladesh Krira Shikkha Protisthan No 2 Ground, Savar
Umpires: Nadir Shah (Ban) and Sarika Prasad (Sin)
Player of the match: Shashikala Siriwardene (SL)

- United States Women won the toss and elected to bat.

=== Group B ===
Team	Pld	W	L	NR	Pts	NRR
West Indies	4	4	0	0	8	+2.617
Pakistan	4	3	1	0	6	+1.776
Bangladesh	4	2	2	0	4	–0.461
Ireland	4	1	3	0	2	–0.600
Japan	4	0	4	0	0	–4.773
Last updated: 11 February 2017.

14 November 2011
09:00
Scorecard

Pakistan; 197 (50 overs)	v	Bangladesh; 124 (42.2 overs)
Bismah Maroof 79 (106); Khadija Tul Kubra 4/41 (10 overs)		Ayasha Rahman 19 (35); Nida Dar 4/29 (8 overs)

Pakistan Women won by 73 runs
Sher-e-Bangla National Cricket Stadium, Dhaka
Umpires: Rob Bailey (Eng) and Richard Smith (Ire)
Player of the match: Bismah Maroof (Pak)

- Pakistan Women won the toss and elected to bat.

14 November 2011
09:00
Scorecard

West Indies; 276/4 (50 overs)	v	Ireland; 63 (30.1 overs)
Stafanie Taylor 107 (154); Isobel Joyce 1/60 (8 overs)		Kim Garth 24 (58) (Note: The number of balls faced by Garth is missing from the ESPNcricinfo and scorecards.); Pearl Etienne 3/16 (7 overs)

West Indies Women won by 213 runs
Bangladesh Krira Shikkha Protisthan No 3 Ground, Savar
Umpires: Kathy Cross (NZ) and Sarika Prasad (Sin)
Player of the match: Juliana Nero (WI)

- Ireland Women won the toss and elected to field.
- Juliana Nero (WI) made her maiden WODI century.

15 November 2011
09:00
Scorecard

Ireland; 140 (44.3 overs)	v	Pakistan; 141/2 (32.2 overs)
Jill Whelan 35 (49); Sadia Yousuf 4/19 (10 overs)		Javeria Khan 41* (63); Jill Whelan 1/26 (7 overs)

Pakistan Women won by 8 wickets
Fatullah Osmani Stadium, Fatullah
Umpires: Enamul Haque (Ban) and Lakani Oala (PNG)
Player of the match: Sadia Yousuf (Pak)

- Ireland Women won the toss and elected to bat.
- Kainat Imtiaz (Pak) made her WODI debut.

15 November 2011
09:00
Scorecard

Japan; 38 (28.3 overs)	v	Bangladesh; 39/0 (4.4 overs)
Mariko Yamamoto 12 (41); Salma Khatun 5/5 (9 overs)		Shukhtara Rahman 16* (12)

Bangladesh Women won by 10 wickets
Bangladesh Krira Shikkha Protisthan No 2 Ground, Savar
Umpires: Kathy Cross (NZ) and Buddhi Pradhan (Nep)
Player of the match: Salma Khatun (Ban)

- Japan Women won the toss and elected to bat.

17 November 2011
09:00
Scorecard

Ireland; 311/9 (50 overs)	v	Japan; 56 (23.2 overs)
Cecelia Joyce 64 (68); Mariko Yamamoto 3/65 (10 overs)		Shizuka Miyaji 13 (20); Eimear Richardson 5/4 (8.2 overs)

Ireland Women won by 255 runs
Sher-e-Bangla National Cricket Stadium, Dhaka
Umpires: Rob Bailey (Eng) and Lakani Oala (PNG)
Player of the match: Eimear Richardson (Ire)

- Japan Women won the toss and elected to field.

17 November 2011
09:00
Scorecard

Pakistan; 140 (49.2 overs)	v	West Indies; 142/2 (34.5 overs)
Nain Abidi 53 (91); Anisa Mohammed 5/26 (10 overs)		Stafanie Taylor 66* (98); Masooma Junaid 1/17 (4 overs)

West Indies Women won by 8 wickets
Bangladesh Krira Shikkha Protisthan No 2 Ground, Savar
Umpires: Nadir Shah (Ban) and Buddhi Pradhan (Nep)
Player of the match: Anisa Mohammed (WI)

- Pakistan Women won the toss and elected to bat.
- Anisa Mohammed (WI) became the first West Indian bowler to take three five-wicket hauls in WODIs and the third player overall.

18 November 2011
09:00
Scorecard

Japan; 71 (38.2 overs)	v	West Indies; 72/0 (16.3 overs)
Mariko Yamamoto 27 (69); Stafanie Taylor 5/13 (7 overs)		Britney Cooper 33* (46)

West Indies Women won by 10 wickets
Fatullah Osmani Stadium, Fatullah
Umpires: Kathy Cross (NZ) and Nadir Shah (Ban)
Player of the match: Stafanie Taylor (WI)

- Japan Women won the toss and elected to bat.

18 November 2011
09:00
Scorecard

Bangladesh; 209/7 (50 overs)	v	Ireland; 114 (36.5 overs)
Shukhtara Rahman 47 (87); Amy Kenealy 2/46 (10 overs)		Cecelia Joyce 44 (65); Khadija Tul Kubra 6/32 (10 overs)

Bangladesh Women won by 95 runs
Bangladesh Krira Shikkha Protisthan No 3 Ground, Savar
Umpires: Rob Bailey (Eng) and Buddhi Pradhan (Nep)
Player of the match: Khadija Tul Kubra (Ban)

- Bangladesh Women won the toss and elected to bat.

20 November 2011
09:00
Scorecard

West Indies; 217/8 (50 overs)	v	Bangladesh; 137 (47.4 overs)
Stafanie Taylor 62 (102); Rumana Ahmed 2/37 (8 overs)		Rumana Ahmed 28* (46); Shaquana Quintyne 3/20 (6.4 overs)

West Indies Women won by 80 runs
Sher-e-Bangla National Cricket Stadium, Dhaka
Umpires: Lakani Oala (PNG) and Buddhi Pradhan (Nep)
Player of the match: Shanel Daley (WI)

- Bangladesh Women won the toss and elected to field.
- West Indies qualified for the 2013 Women's Cricket World Cup.

20 November 2011
09:00
Scorecard

Pakistan; 272/9 (50 overs)	v	Japan; 26 (28 overs)
Nida Dar 124 (139); Ema Kuribayashi 3/31 (9 overs)		Mariko Yamamoto 10 (37); Sadia Yousuf 6/2 (7 overs)

Pakistan Women won by 246 runs
Bangladesh Krira Shikkha Protisthan No 3 Ground, Savar
Umpires: Enamul Haque (Ban) and Richard Smith (Ire)
Player of the match: Sadia Yousuf (Pak)

- Pakistan Women won the toss and elected to bat.

== Knockout round ==
Quarterfinal
A3	Netherlands	84
B2	Pakistan	277/4
A2	Sri Lanka	101/4
B3	Bangladesh	100

Semifinal
A1	South Africa	180/9
Q1	Pakistan	181/7
Q2	Sri Lanka	177/7
B1	West Indies	235/5

Final
S1	Pakistan	120
S2	West Indies	250/5

=== Quarterfinals ===
22 November 2011
09:00
Scorecard

Bangladesh; 100 (47 overs)	v	Sri Lanka; 101/4 (26.3 overs)
Salma Khatun 32 (76); Udeshika Prabodhani 2/14 (7 overs)		Chamari Atapattu 26 (47); Salma Khatun 2/26 (6.3 overs)

Sri Lanka Women won by 6 wickets
Sher-e-Bangla National Cricket Stadium, Dhaka
Umpires: Kathy Cross (NZ) and Richard Smith (Ire)
Player of the match: Salma Khatun (Ban)

- Bangladesh Women won the toss and elected to bat.
- Sri Lanka qualified for the 2013 Women's Cricket World Cup.

22 November 2011
09:00
Scorecard

Pakistan; 277/4 (50 overs)	v	Netherlands; 84 (37 overs)
Javeria Khan 67 (53); Esther Lanser 2/49 (10 overs)		Kerry-Anne Tomlinson 22 (61); Bismah Maroof 3/13 (6 overs)

Pakistan Women won by 193 runs
Fatullah Osmani Stadium, Fatullah
Umpires: Nadir Shah (Ban) and Buddhi Pradhan (Nep)
Player of the match: Bismah Maroof (Pak)

- Pakistan Women won the toss and elected to bat.
- Pakistan qualified for the 2013 Women's Cricket World Cup and the 2012 ICC Women's World Twenty20.

=== Semifinals ===
24 November 2011
09:00
Scorecard

South Africa; 180/9 (50 overs)	v	Pakistan; 181/7 (47.5 overs)
Mignon du Preez 41 (61); Asmavia Iqbal 3/15 (5 overs)		Javeria Khan 47 (75); Sunette Loubser 2/22 (10 overs)

Pakistan Women won by 3 wickets
Sher-e-Bangla National Cricket Stadium, Dhaka
Umpires: Nadir Shah (Ban) and Sarika Prasad (Sin)
Player of the match: Asmavia Iqbal (Pak)

- South Africa Women won the toss and elected to bat.

24 November 2011
09:00
Scorecard

West Indies; 235/5 (50.0 overs)	v	Sri Lanka; 177/7 (50 overs)
Deandra Dottin 73 (86); Oshadi Ranasinghe 2/31 (10 overs)		Chamari Atapattu 56 (89); Anisa Mohammed 3/29 (6 overs)

West Indies Women won by 58 runs
Fatullah Osmani Stadium, Fatullah
Umpires: Lakani Oala (PNG) and Richard Smith (Ire)
Player of the match: Deandra Dottin (WI)

- West Indies Women won the toss and elected to bat.
- Oshadi Ranasinghe (SL) made her WODI debut.

=== Final ===
26 November 2011
09:00
Scoecard

West Indies; 250/5 (50 overs)	v	Pakistan; 120 (37.3 overs)
Deandra Dottin 95 (83); Bismah Maroof 2/32 (9 overs)		Qanita Jalil 53 (75); Anisa Mohammed 7/14 (8.3 overs)

West Indies won by 130 runs
Sher-e-Bangla National Cricket Stadium, Dhaka

- West Indies Women won the toss and elected to bat.

== Classification round ==
=== 9th place ===
22 November 2011
09:00
Scorecard

Japan; 152 (49.5 overs)	v	Zimbabwe; 146/8 (50 overs)
Ema Kuribayashi 47 (86); Priuilifgf Charumbira 2/10 (2 overs)		Modester Mupachikwa 32 (79); Ayako Nakayama 1/15 (4 overs)

Japan Women won by 6 runs
BKSP 2, Savar

- Zimbabwe Women won the toss and elected to field.

=== 5th–8th place play-off ===
24 November 2011
09:00
Scorecard

United States; 78 (47.3 overs)	v	Bangladesh; 79/1 (18.5 Overs)
Doris Francis 23 (85); Khadija Tul Kubra 4/20 (10 overs)		Shukhtara Rahman 29 (61); Triholder Marshall 1/9 (4 overs)

Bangladesh won by 9 wickets
BKSP 2, Savar

- United States Women won the toss and elected to bat.
- Bangladesh Women earned ODI status as a result of the win, the only time as of the qualification pathway for the 2025 Women's Cricket World Cup that ODI status has changed hands as a direct result of a qualifier.

24 November 2011
09:00
Scorecard

Netherlands; 139/9 (50.0 overs)	v	Ireland; 140/6 (32.3 overs)
Kerry-Anne Tomlinson 34 (72); Eimear Richardson 2/34 (10 overs)		Jill Whelan 27 (37); Leonie Bennett 3/20 (7 Overs)

Ireland won by 4 wickets
BKSP 2, Savar

- Netherlands Women won the toss and elected to bat.
- Netherlands Women lost ODI status as a result of the loss.

==== 7th place play-off ====
26 November 2011
09:00
Scorecard

Netherlands; 293/7 (50 overs)	v	United States; 167/8 (50 overs)
Kerry-Anne Tomlinson 73 (65); Erica Rendler 2/40 (6 overs)		Erica Rendler 36 (80); Kerry-Anne Tomlinson 4/42 (10 overs)

Netherlands won by 126 runs
BKSP 3, Savar

- United States Women won the toss and elected to field.

==== 5th place play-off ====
26 November 2011
09:00
Scorecard

Bangladesh; 210/7 (50 overs)	v	Ireland; 128 (45.4 overs)
Shukhtara Rahman 53 (119); Jill Whelan 3/31 (8 overs)		Cecelia Joyce 42 (72); Salma Khatun 3/34 (10 overs)

Bangladesh won by 82 runs
BKSP 2, Savar

- Bangladesh Women won the toss and elected to bat.
- First ODI match for Bangladesh.
- Ayasha Rahman, Sharmin Akhter, Fargana Hoque, Salma Khatun, Lata Mondal, Rumana Ahmed, Shathira Jakir, Panna Ghosh, Jahanara Alam, Sultana Yesmin and Khadija Tul Kubra all made their WODI debut.

=== 3rd place play-off ===
26 November 2011
09:00
Scorecard

South Africa; 192 (50 overs)	v	Sri Lanka; 193/7 (49.4 overs)
Shandre Fritz 68 (126); Sandamali Dolawatte 3/23 (4 overs)		Chamari Atapattu 60 (67); Akhona Nyiki 2/32 (9 overs); Marizanne Kapp 2/32 (10 overs)

Sri Lanka won by 3 wickets
Fatullah Osmani Stadium, Fatullah

- South Africa Women won the toss and elected to bat.

== Final standings ==
Pos	Team	Qualification
1st	West Indies	2013 Women's Cricket World Cup
2nd	Pakistan	2013 Women's Cricket World Cup and the 2012 ICC Women's World Twenty20
3rd	Sri Lanka	2013 Women's Cricket World Cup
4th	South Africa	2013 Women's Cricket World Cup and the 2012 ICC Women's World Twenty20
5th	Bangladesh	Women's One Day International status
6th	Ireland	Women's One Day International status
7th	Netherlands	
8th	United States	
9th	Japan	
10th	Zimbabwe	
