= Laura Brouwers (cricketer) =

Dutch cricketer

Personal information
- Born: 30 August 1988 (age 38); Utrecht, Netherlands
- Batting: Right-handed
- Bowling: Right-arm medium

International information
- National side: Netherlands (2009–2013)
- ODI debut (cap 80): 6 October 2010 v West Indies
- Last ODI: 22 November 2011 v Pakistan
- T20I debut (cap 15): 6 August 2009 v Ireland
- Last T20I: 20 August 2011 v Ireland

Career statistics
| Competition | ODI | T20I |
|---|---|---|
| Matches | 12 | 8 |
| Runs scored | 31 | 12 |
| Batting average | 5.16 | 12.00 |
| 100s/50s | 0/0 | 0/0 |
| Top score | 8 | 5* |
| Balls bowled | 366 | 124 |
| Wickets | 6 | 1 |
| Bowling average | 48.83 | 137.00 |
| 5 wickets in innings | 0 | 0 |
| 10 wickets in match | 0 | 0 |
| Best bowling | 2/18 | 1/19 |
| Catches/stumpings | 3/– | 1/– |
- Source: CricketArchive, 6 November 2015

Laura Brouwers (born 30 August 1988) is a Dutch cricketer who debuted for the Dutch national side in August 2009. A right-arm medium-pace bowler, she has so far played twelve One Day International (ODI) matches and eight Twenty20 International games.

Born in Utrecht, Brouwers represented the Netherlands at the 2006 European Under-21 Championship, aged 17. Her senior debut came three years later, in a Twenty20 International against Ireland at the 2009 European Twenty20 Championship. Brouwers made her ODI debut at the 2010 ICC Women's Challenge in South Africa, playing in all five of her team's matches. The following year, against Ireland in a four-team ODI series in Sri Lanka, Brouwers took career-best figures of 2/18 from six overs. She was part of the Dutch team that won the Women's European Championship, in Aug 2011. The only time the Dutch team won this Championship. At the 2011 World Cup Qualifier, where Brouwers featured in three out of her team's five matches, the Netherlands placed seventh, losing its ODI and T20I status. The team has continued to participate in minor international tournaments, with Brouwers' last international match to date coming against Thailand at the 2013 World Twenty20 Qualifier. Because she only took a single wicket in eight T20I fixtures, her T20I career bowling average stands at 137.00, which has been exceeded only by her teammate Annemarie Tanke.
