= List of Canada women Twenty20 International cricketers =

This is a list of Canada women Twenty20 International cricketers. A Twenty20 International is an international cricket match between two representative teams. A Twenty20 International is played under the rules of Twenty20 cricket. In April 2018, the International Cricket Council (ICC) granted full international status to Twenty20 women's matches played between member sides from 1 July 2018 onwards. The Canada women's team made their Twenty20 International debut on 17 May 2019 against the United States in Lauderhill during the 2019 ICC Women's T20 World Cup Americas Region Qualifier.

The list is arranged in the order in which each player won her first Twenty20 cap. Where more than one player won her first Twenty20 cap in the same match, they are listed alphabetically by surname.

== Key ==
General

- ‡ – Captain
- † – Wicket-keeper
- First – Year of debut
- Last – Year of latest game
- Mat – Number of matches played

Batting

- Runs – Runs scored in career
- HS – Highest score
- Avg – Runs scored per dismissal
- * – Batsman remained not out
- 50 – Number of half centuries

Bowling

- Wkt – Wickets taken in career
- BBI – Best bowling in an innings
- Ave – Average runs per wicket

Fielding

- Ca – Catches taken
- St – Stumpings affected

== Players ==
Statistics are correct as of 2 August 2026.

General					Batting				Bowling				Fielding		Ref
No.	Name	First	Last	Mat	Runs	HS	Avg	50	Balls	Wkt	BBI	Ave	Ca	St	Ref
1	Habeeba Bader†	2019	2025	17	91	21*	7.58	0	–	–	–	–	6	6	
2	Hala Azmat	2019	2021	9	5	2	1.66	0	150	10	4/15	10.00	4	0	
3	Hiba Shamshad	2019	2021	8	2	2*	0.66	0	150	6	1/8	14.00	0	0	
4	Kainat Qazi	2019	2025	16	75	24	6.81	0	–	–	–	–	1	0	
5	Miryam Khokar	2019	2021	9	74	27	8.22	0	–	–	–	–	1	0	
6	Mahewish Khan‡	2019	2019	3	17	8	5.66	0	54	3	2/11	15.33	0	0	
7	Maliha Baig†	2019	2019	3	0	0*	–	0	–	–	–	–	0	0	
8	Chuntell Martin	2019	2019	3	29	20	9.66	0	6	0	–	–	0	0	
9	Kamna Mirchandani	2019	2021	9	52	24	8.66	0	72	1	1/8	87.00	2	0	
10	Achini Perera	2019	2026	36	420	49	13.12	0	202	12	5/10	14.00	15	0	
11	Saniyah Zia	2019	2023	13	58	16	7.25	0	240	14	3/9	11.35	6	0	
12	Monali Patel	2019	2019	2	16	12	8.00	0	–	–	–	–	0	0	
13	Mukhwinder Gill	2021	2021	5	32	19	16.00	0	77	5	2/6	8.00	1	0	
14	Mahrukh Imtiaz	2021	2021	3	14	13	7.00	0	6	0	–	–	0	0	
15	Divya Saxena	2021	2023	12	354	70*	44.25	2	198	8	2/3	16.62	5	0	
16	Sonail Vig	2021	2021	6	15	13	5.00	0	78	2	1/9	26.00	1	0	
17	Sana Zafar†	2021	2023	9	3	2	0.75	0	–	–	–	–	5	7	
18	Krima Kapadia	2021	2026	28	84	27	5.60	0	162	7	3/20	18.85	9	0	
19	Jasmina Oldham	2021	2025	3	5	5	5.00	0	1	0	–	–	1	0	
20	Kate Gray	2021	2021	3	7	6	3.50	0	–	–	–	–	0	0	
21	Amarpal Kaur	2023	2025	21	352	37	25.14	0	406	29	4/1	10.17	4	0	
22	Mannat Hundal	2023	2026	19	13	4*	2.60	0	278	20	3/14	13.00	6	0	
23	Danielle McGahey	2023	2023	6	118	48	19.66	0	–	–	–	–	4	0	
24	Rhea Misra	2023	2023	6	70	31	17.50	0	44	2	1/0	13.00	0	0	
25	Vijayani Vithanage	2023	2025	5	1	1	0.50	0	96	4	2/13	20.00	1	0	
26	Nicole Gallagher	2023	2023	2	12	7	5.00	0	–	–	–	–	0	0	
27	Rabbjyot Rajput	2023	2026	24	91	21	7.58	0	210	8	3/16	23.50	3	0	
28	Indomatie Goordial-John	2025	2025	15	139	42	11.58	0	292	10	2/9	23.00	2	0	
29	Terisha Lavia	2025	2025	14	74	19	7.40	0	247	13	3/7	11.76	3	0	
30	Vandana Mahajan	2025	2025	15	140	22	11.66	0	234	8	2/12	24.50	9	0	
31	Tiffany Thorpe	2025	2025	15	26	6	3.25	0	108	5	2/6	20.20	2	0	
32	Mohini Kalra	2025	2025	3	2	2	2.00	0	–	–	–	–	0	0	
33	Zeel Patel	2025	2025	7	13	7	3.25	0	–	–	–	–	0	0	
34	Srishti Raha	2025	2025	7	0	0*	0.00	0	–	–	–	–	4	1	
35	Vritti Dahiya	2025	2026	9	50	15*	12.50	0	18	1	1/12	12.00	1	0	
36	Harper Chalmers	2026	2026	7	58	21	11.60	0	100	7	2/2	9.85	4	0	
37	Hasini Santoshkumar	2026	2026	6	11	7*	3.66	0	33	2	2/12	19.50	1	0	
38	Khadeeja Fatima†	2026	2026	7	55	24	11.00	0	–	–	–	–	5	1	
39	Sanjana Rao	2026	2026	3	2	2	2.00	0	6	0	–	–	1	0	
40	Shreya Voya	2026	2026	7	0	0	0.00	0	120	9	4/4	7.88	1	0	
41	Snigdha Malhotra	2026	2026	7	16	12	4.00	0	114	10	3/19	7.60	1	0	
42	Neha Teny	2026	2026	2	–	–	–	–	–	–	–	–	0	0	
43	Maren Couch	2026	2026	1	2	2	2.00	0	–	–	–	–	0	0	
44	Elyssa Sun	2026	2026	2	–	–	–	–	–	–	–	–	0	0	
