= Bruning (surname) =

Bruning or Brüning is a surname. Notable people with the surname include:

- Bunny Bruning (born 1957), American professional tennis player
- Elfriede Brüning (1910–2014), German journalist and novelist
- Friederike Irina Bruning (born 1957/58), German animal rights activist
- Hans Heinrich Brüning (1848–1928), Peruvian archaeologist
- Heinrich Brüning (1885–1970), German chancellor of the Weimar Republic
- Jon Bruning (born 1969), American politician from Nebraska
- Julian Brüning (born 1994), German politician
- Michael Brüning (born 1969), American beach volleyball player
- Monika Brüning (1951–2022), German politician
- Richard Bruning (born 1953), American graphic designer and comics creator
- Richard Bruning (MP) (1531–1573/80), English politician
- Robert Bruning (1928–2008), Australian actor
- Shasha Brüning (born 1994), Dutch cricketer
- Uschi Brüning (born 1947), German jazz and soul singer and songwriter
