= Jojo White =

Jojo White may refer to:

- Jo-Jo White (1909–1986), American baseball player
- Jo Jo White (1946–2018), American basketball player

== See also ==
- Jo White (born 1964), British Member of Parliament for Bassetlaw
- Jo White (cricketer) (born 1979), Canadian cricketer
- Joseph White (disambiguation)
