= Tessa van der Gun =

Dutch cricketer (born 1982)

Personal information
- Born: 24 July 1982 (age 44); The Hague, Netherlands
- Batting: Right-handed
- Bowling: Right-arm off spin

International information
- National side: Netherlands (2000–2014)
- ODI debut (cap 55): 30 November 2000 v England
- Last ODI: 16 December 2000 v Australia

Career statistics
Competition	WODI
Matches	7
Runs scored	64
Batting average	10.66
100s/50s	0/0
Top score	43
Balls bowled	66
Wickets	3
Bowling average	20.00
5 wickets in innings	0
10 wickets in match	0
Best bowling	3/18
Catches/stumpings	3/–
- Source: CricketArchive, 18 October 2015

Tessa van der Gun (born 24 July 1982) is a Dutch cricketer whose international career for the Dutch national side spanned from 2000 to 2014. She played in seven One Day International (ODI) matches, all of which came at the 2000 World Cup.

Born in The Hague, van der Gun made her senior debut for the Netherlands at the age of 18, on a tour of England in August 2000. Later in the year, she was selected in the Dutch squad for the 2000 World Cup in New Zealand, as its youngest member. Van der Gun went on to play in all seven of her team's matches, scoring 64 runs and taking three wickets. Her best score was 43, made from seventh in the batting order against Ireland, although in four other matches she made ducks. Against Sri Lanka, she had figures of 3/18 from four overs, her only wickets at ODI level.

After the World Cup, van der Gun did not return to the national squad until 2012, when she played a single match for the Netherlands in the Women's County Championship. Her next international tournament was the 2013 Women's World Twenty20 Qualifier in Ireland, where she appeared in three matches with moderate success – she scored 28 not out against Zimbabwe, 11 against Pakistan, and 20 against Ireland. In the 2013 County Championship, van der Gun was one of only three Dutch players to feature in every match, along with Denise Hannema and overseas player Clare Crewdson. She finished the competition with 291 runs, behind only Crewdson and Miranda Veringmeier for the Netherlands, and recorded two half-centuries – 51 not out against Hampshire and 73 not out against Northamptonshire. In 2014, van der Gun played for the Netherlands in both the English competitions and the European Championship, although she has not appeared at national level since then.
