= Danielle McGahey =

Australian cricketer

Personal information
- Born: 14 April 1994 (age 32); Brisbane, Australia
- Batting: Right-handed
- Bowling: Right-arm off spin
- Role: Wicket-keeper

International information
- National side: Canada (2023)
- T20I debut (cap 21): 4 September 2023 v Brazil
- Last T20I: 11 September 2023 v United States

Career statistics
Competition	WT20I
Matches	6
Runs scored	118
Batting average	19.66
100s/50s	0/0
Top score	48
Catches/stumpings	4/–
- Source: ESPNcricinfo, 7 October 2024

Danielle McGahey (born 14 April 1994) is an Australian-born cricketer who played for the Canada women's national cricket team. She was the first transgender person named in an international squad, going on to play six matches before retiring following changes made to gender eligibility rules by the International Cricket Council.

== Domestic career ==
McGahey started playing club cricket in Melbourne before moving to Canada, where she joined the Cavaliers Cricket Club in Regina, Saskatchewan. She played a single season for the men's team before switching to the women's team the following year. McGahey has also played in the Alberta Women's Cricket League and represented Alberta in inter-provincial cricket as Saskatchewan does not have its own women's team.

McGahey was the leading run-scorer at the 2023 Women T20 National Championship, recording 237 runs from three innings and the only century of the tournament.

== International career ==
In October 2022, McGahey was named in the Canadian squad for the 2022 Women's South American Cricket Championship in Brazil. Canada's matches at the tournament did not have official Twenty20 International status. McGahey opened the batting for the Canadian XI and was named player of the match against Brazil after scoring 73 runs from 46 balls.

In August 2023, McGahey was named in Canada's squad for the 2023 ICC Women's T20 World Cup Americas Qualifier in Los Angeles, part of the qualification process for the 2024 ICC Women's T20 World Cup. Her inclusion in the squad attracted international attention, as she would become the first transgender person to play official international cricket, a previously novel circumstance becoming frequently common to other leagues across the world.

On 4 September 2023 McGahey made her Twenty20 International debut for Canada against Brazil.

A spokesperson from the International Cricket Council (ICC) had confirmed that McGahey had been "deemed eligible to participate in international women's cricket on the basis that she satisfies the MTF transgender eligibility criteria". However on 21 November 2023, the ICC banned transgender players from being able to play women's cricket and McGahey announced her international retirement.

== Personal life ==
McGahey moved to Canada in February 2020. She socially transitioned to living as a woman in November 2020 and commenced medically transitioning in May 2021. McGahey lost contact with her family in Australia after transitioning.
