= Hannah Hofman =

Dutch cricketer (born 1981)

Personal information
- Full name: Cornelia Hannah Hofman
- Born: November 10, 1981 (age 44); Rotterdam, Netherlands

International information
- National side: Netherlands
- Source: Cricinfo, 26 December 2017

Hannah Hofman (born 10 November 1981) is a Dutch woman cricketer. She made her international debut at the 2013 ICC Women's World Twenty20 Qualifier.
