= Friederike Irina Bruning =

German animal rights activist

- Born: Friederike Irina Bruning; 1957 or 1958 (age 67–68); Berlin, Germany
- Other name: Sudevi Mataji
- Occupation: Animal rights activist
- Years active: 1996–present
- Notable credit: Radha Surabhi Goshala
- Awards: Padma Shri (2019)

Friederike Irina Bruning, now called Sudevi Mataji, is a German animal rights activist. She was awarded India's fourth highest civilian award, the Padma Shri in 2019. She was the founder of Radha Surabhi Goshala in 1996. A German citizen, Sudevi Mataji has resided in Radha Kund (Vrindavan) for over 35 years, taking care of cows in need.

== Early life ==
At the age of 20, in 1978, she arrived in India as a tourist after completing her education in Berlin, Germany. In search of life's purpose, she went to Radha Kund in Uttar Pradesh. She then became a disciple of guru Srila Tinkudi Gosvami. At a neighbour's request, she bought a cow. She also taught herself Hindi, bought books related to cows and devoted herself completely to taking care of stray animals.

== Philosophy ==
She has been staying in India for more than 25 years. Her way of life is highly influenced by the teachings of Bhagavad Gita, Upanishads, traditions and the temples built there. Since this knowledge was not readily available in her country, she considers Indians as lucky, where even children are taught through their tradition and mythology stories without having to search for it, it is imbibed in them.

She is a vegetarian and considers any form of activity that causes violence, fear and hatred are bad for health. She believes food has a major impact on our lives. Food follows in three categories sattva (pure and light), rajas (active and passionate) and tamas (heavy, gross and violent). Meat falls in tama and hence she has given it up.

She regards human consciousness as of highest value. According to her, people will be better without greed and selfishness. She believes in doing God's work and has thus devoted her life to selflessly helping cows in need by donating whatever she earns to her Gaushala.

== Career ==
Friederike Irina Bruning landed in Mathura, India from Berlin in 1978 as a tourist. She was moved by the plight of the stray animals and hence decided to stay back and care for them. German citizen Friederike Irina Bruning, now called Sudevi Mataji, started Radha Surabhi Gaushala Niketan in Radhakund in 1996.

This Gaushala (cowshed) is spread across 3,300 sq yd (2,800 m^{2}). It takes in sick, injured, unable to walk and starved cows. Here, they receive necessary nutrition and are nursed back to health. Sudevi Mataji built the gaushala with minor detailing in mind. The gaushala is divided in such a manner where the cows needing special care have a place for themselves. Blind and severely injured cows, needing attention are kept in separate enclosure. Currently she has 90 workers and 1800 sick cows. On the 71st Republic Day the government of India recognised her services and she was honoured with a Padma Shri.

Getting funds has been one of the major challenges faced by Friederike Irina. To address this, she has been renting her native property in Berlin but all her funds get exhausted in taking care in running the Gaushala. She does not get any support from any government agencies. Also in 2019, she was facing issue about visa, which was resolved by Sushma Swaraj and Hema Malini.

== Awards ==
- Padma Shri Award given by President, Ram Nath Kovind on Republic Day, 2019.

== Controversy ==
In May 2019, Bruning's visa extension was denied, which prompted her to threaten to return her Padma Shri. The extension to her student visa was denied due to a technical problem which prevented her from converting her student visa to an employment visa. She later publicly apologised and thanked Sushma Swaraj, the then External Affairs Minister, for looking into the matter.
