= Khamla Khedi =

- village
- Location within Madhya Pradesh Location within India
- Coordinates: 23.2322037°N 77.2419522°E
- Country: India
- State: Madhya Pradesh
- District: Bhopal
- Tehsil: Huzur
- Elevation: 511 m (1,677 ft)

Population (2011)
  - Total: 354
- Time zone: UTC+5:30 (IST)
- ISO 3166 code: MP-IN
- 2011 census code: 482481

Khamla Khedi is a village in the Bhopal district of Madhya Pradesh, India. It is located in the Huzur tehsil and the Phanda block.

== Demographics ==
According to the 2011 census of India, Khamla Khedi has 75 households. The effective literacy rate (i.e. the literacy rate of population excluding children aged 6 and below) is 79.47%.

Demographics (2011 Census)
	Total	Male	Female
Population	354	179	175
Children aged below 6 years	52	26	26
Scheduled caste	26	12	14
Scheduled tribe	13	5	8
Literates	240	131	109
Workers (all)	109	79	30
Main workers (total)	57	47	10
Main workers: Cultivators	26	20	6
Main workers: Agricultural labourers	6	4	2
Main workers: Household industry workers	2	2	0
Main workers: Other	23	21	2
Marginal workers (total)	52	32	20
Marginal workers: Cultivators	13	1	12
Marginal workers: Agricultural labourers	13	9	4
Marginal workers: Household industry workers	3	2	1
Marginal workers: Others	23	20	3
Non-workers	245	100	145
