= Phira-on Khamla =

Thai cricketer (born 1995)

Personal information
- Born: 31 October 1995 (age 30)
- Batting: Right-handed
- Bowling: Right-arm medium

International information
- National side: Thailand
- Source: Cricinfo, 9 January 2018

Phira-on Khamla (born 31 October 1995) is a Thai woman cricketer. She made her international debut in a WT20I in the 2012 Women's Twenty20 Asia Cup, scoring 4 runs against Pakistan.

She was also the member of the national team at the 2013 ICC Women's World Twenty20 Qualifier.
