= Sharyce Saili =

Zimbabwean cricketer (born 1982)

Hazvinei Saili
Personal information
- Born: 2 September 1982 (age 43)
- Batting: Right-handed
- Bowling: Right-arm fast medium
- Role: Bowler

International information
- National side: Zimbabwe
- Source: Cricinfo, 19 November 2017

Hazvinei Sharyce Saili (born 2 September 1982) is a Zimbabwean woman cricketer. She represented Zimbabwe at the 2013 ICC Women's World Twenty20 Qualifier. In the 2013 ICC Women's World Cup Qualifier, she was the second joint wicket taker in the tournament along with Leonie Bennett (7 wickets).
