= Liu Jingmin =

Liu Jingmin (Chinese: 刘敬民; b. January 1952) is the Vice Mayor of Beijing, and Executive Vice President of the Beijing Organizing Committee for the Games of the XXIX Olympiad.

== Biography and career ==
- He graduated from Beijing 101 Middle School and Renmin University of China (majoring in economics).
- Liu was also involved in Beijing's Olympic bid as Executive Vice President of the Beijing 2008 Olympic Games Bid Committee.
- Current Vice Mayor of Beijing.
