= Chihiro Sakamoto =

Japanese cricketer

Personal information
- Born: March 4, 1994 (age 31); Tochigi, Japan
- Batting: Left-handed
- Bowling: Right-arm off break

International information
- National side: Japan
- Source: Cricinfo, 12 January 2018

Chihiro Sakamoto (坂本千尋, Sakamoto Chihiro; born 4 March 1994) is a Japanese woman cricketer. She made her international debut at the 2013 ICC Women's World Twenty20 Qualifier. She was also the member of the national team in the 2014 Asian Games.
