= Manami Takada =

Japanese cricketer

Personal information
- Born: 9 September 1988 (age 37); Tokyo, Japan
- Batting: Right-handed

International information
- National side: Japan
- Source: Cricinfo, 13 January 2018

Manami Takada (高田麻菜美, Takada Manami; born 9 September 1988) is a Japanese woman cricketer. She made her international debut in the 2013 ICC Women's World Twenty20 Qualifier. Manami also competed at the 2014 Asian Games representing the national team.
