= Shasha Brüning =

Dutch cricketer (born 1994)

Sasa Brüning
Personal information
- Born: December 24, 1994 (age 31)
- Batting: Right-handed
- Bowling: Right-arm off-break

International information
- National side: Netherlands
- Source: Cricinfo, 26 December 2017

Sasa Brüning (born 24 December 1994) is a Dutch woman cricketer. She made her international debut at the 2013 ICC Women's World Twenty20 Qualifier.
