= Jo White (cricketer) =

Canadian cricketer (born 1979)

Personal information
- Full name: Joanna White
- Born: 3 March 1979 (age 47)

International information
- National side: Canada

Joanna White (born 3 March 1979) is a Canadian former cricketer. She played for Canada in the inaugural edition of the ICC Women's World Twenty20 Qualifier in 2013.
