= Natural Yip =

Hong Kong cricketer (born 1985)

Personal information
- Full name: Sze Wan Natural Yip
- Born: May 4, 1985 (age 41)
- Batting: Right-handed
- Role: Wicket-keeper

International information
- National side: Hong Kong
- Source: Cricinfo, 3 January 2018

Sze Wan Natural Yip (born 4 May 1985) is a Hong Kong women's cricketer who is also a current member of the Hong Kong cricket team.

Natural Yip made her international debut at the 2012 Women's Twenty20 Asia Cup. She too was part of the national team in the 2010 Asian Games and 2014 Asian Games.
