= Akhona Nyiki =

South African cricketer (born 1992)

Personal information
- Full name: Akhona Nyiki
- Born: 2 June 1992 (age 34); Fort Beaufort, Cape Province, South Africa
- Batting: Right-handed
- Bowling: Right-arm off break
- Role: Bowler

International information
- National side: South Africa (2011)
- Only ODI (cap 61): 26 November 2011 v Sri Lanka

Domestic team information
- Years: Team
- 2006/07–2014/15: Border

Career statistics
Competition	WODI	WLA	WT20
Matches	1	55	5
Runs scored	0	353	12
Batting average	0.00	9.54	–
100s/50s	0/0	0/0	0/0
Top score	0	40	12*
Balls bowled	54	1,520	90
Wickets	2	41	4
Bowling average	16.00	15.48	14.50
5 wickets in innings	0	2	0
10 wickets in match	0	0	0
Best bowling	2/32	6/33	3/6
Catches/stumpings	0/–	12/–	1/–
- Source: CricketArchive, 19 February 2021

Akhona Nyiki (born 2 June 1992) is a South African former cricketer who played as a right-arm off break bowler. She appeared in one One Day International for South Africa in 2011, against Sri Lanka in the 2011 Women's Cricket World Cup Qualifier. She played domestic cricket for Border.
