= Joe White (ice hockey) =

British ice hockey player

- Born: 9 July 1988 (age 36); Swindon, England, UK
- Height: 5 ft 9 in (175 cm)
- Weight: 154 lb (70 kg; 11 st 0 lb)
- Position: Goaltender
- Catches: Left
- EIHL team: Basingstoke Bison
- Playing career: 2002–present

Joe White (born 9 July 1988 in Swindon) is a British professional ice hockey goaltender currently playing in the Elite Ice Hockey League for the Basingstoke Bison.

White had spells with the Invicta Dynamos and the Guildford Flames before joining his hometown team the Swindon Wildcats in 2006. After two years, he signed with the Basingstoke Bison in 2008.
