= Ishitaa Gidwani =

Hong Kong cricketer (born 1992)

Ishitaa Anoop Gidwani (born May 9, 1992 in Hong Kong) is a Hong Kong cricketer who played for Hong Kong women's national cricket team as a captain. She made her debut for Hong Kong women's national cricket team against Pakistan women's national cricket team in 2006 at the Gaddafi Stadium in Lahore.

She has represented Hong Kong at the 2010 Asian Games, and captained the side at the 2014 Asian Games.

She retired from International cricket in 2016, and began her career as a Physical Education Teacher after representing Hong Kong for 10 years. She currently plays for Hong Kong Cricket Club and Singapore Cricket Club.
