= Eri Yamaguchi (cricketer) =

Japanese cricketer

Personal information
- Born: 15 June 1992 (age 34); Osaka Prefecture, Japan
- Batting: Right-handed
- Role: Wicket-keeper

International information
- National side: Japan
- Source: Cricinfo, 8 January 2017

Eri Yamaguchi (Kanji: 山口 栄理, born 15 June 1992) is a Japanese woman cricketer. She made her international debut for Japan in the 2013 ICC Women's World Twenty20 Qualifier.

Eri was also the member of the Japanese cricket team at the 2014 Asian Games.
