= Onika Wallerson =

American cricketer

Personal information
- Full name: Onika Theola Wallerson
- Born: 18 April 1985 (age 41); Georgetown, Guyana
- Batting: Right-handed
- Bowling: Right-arm medium

International information
- National side: United States
- T20I debut (cap 11): 17 May 2019 v Canada
- Last T20I: 7 September 2019 v Namibia

Domestic team information
- Years: Team
- 2002–2003: Guyana
- 2010–2011: Guyana

Career statistics
Competition	WT20I
Matches	7
Runs scored	32
Batting average	6.40
100s/50s	0/0
Top score	23
Balls bowled	102
Wickets	2
Bowling average	39.00
5 wickets in innings	0
10 wickets in match	0
Best bowling	1/14
Catches/stumpings	1/–
- Source: Cricinfo, 4 May 2021

Onika Wallerson (born 18 April 1985) is a Guyanese-born American cricketer. She made her Women's Twenty20 International (WT20I) debut for the United States women's cricket team on 17 May 2019, against Canada, in the 2019 ICC Women's Qualifier Americas tournament.

In August 2019, she was named in United States' squad for the 2019 ICC Women's World Twenty20 Qualifier tournament in Scotland. She played in the United States' opening match of the tournament, on 31 August 2019, against Scotland.

In February 2021, she was named in the Women's National Training Group by the USA Cricket Women's National Selectors ahead of the 2021 Women's Cricket World Cup Qualifier and the 2021 ICC Women's T20 World Cup Americas Qualifier tournaments.
