= Premwadee Doungsin =

Thai cricketer (born 1993)

Personal information
- Born: December 16, 1993 (age 31)

International information
- National side: Thailand
- Source: Cricinfo, 7 January 2018

Premwadee Doungsin (born 16 December 1993) is a Thai woman cricketer. She made her international debut at the 2013 ICC Women's World Twenty20 Qualifier and was also part of the national team at the 2015 ICC Women's World Twenty20 Qualifier.

Premwadee also competed at the 2014 Asian Games representing Thailand.
