= Pundarika Prathanmitr =

Thai cricketer and footballer (born 1990)

Personal information
- Born: 13 November 1990 (age 35)
- Batting: Right-handed
- Role: Wicket-keeper

International information
- National side: Thailand
- Source: Cricinfo, 7 January 2018

Pundarika Prathanmitr (born 13 November 1990) is a Thai woman cricketer and a footballer. She made her international debut for Thailand in the 2013 ICC Women's World Twenty20 Qualifier.

She was also a member of the national cricket team at the 2010 Asian Games and 2014 Asian Games.
