= Chandima Gunaratne =

Sri Lankan cricketer (born 1982)

Personal information
- Born: 24 February 1982 (age 44); Uragasmanhandiya, Sri Lanka
- Batting: Left-handed

International information
- National side: Sri Lanka
- ODI debut (cap 53): 29 April 2012 v West Indies
- Last ODI: 15 July 2017 v Pakistan
- ODI shirt no.: 24
- T20I debut (cap 24): 1 May 2012 v West Indies
- Last T20I: 2 April 2014 v New Zealand

Career statistics
Competition	WODI	WT20I
Matches	15	19
Runs scored	44	1
Batting average	8.80	1.00
100s/50s	0/0	0/0
Top score	13*	1*
Balls bowled	672	386
Wickets	10	11
Bowling average	43.80	34.18
5 wickets in innings	0	0
10 wickets in match	0	0
Best bowling	4/41	2/7
Catches/stumpings	2/–	2/–
Medal record
Representing Sri Lanka
Women's Cricket
Asian Games
Bronze medal – third place	2014 Incheon	Team
- Source: ESPNcricinfo, 19 September 2021

Chandima Gunaratne (born 24 February 1982) is a Sri Lankan cricketer who has played for the women's national cricket team. She made her WODI and WT20I debut against the West Indies, in April and May 2012, respectively.
