= Rattana Sangsoma =

Thai cricketer (born 1989)

Personal information
- Born: 2 June 1989 (age 37)
- Batting: Right-handed
- Bowling: Right-arm offbreak

International information
- National side: Thailand
Medal record
Representing Thailand
Women's Cricket
Southeast Asian Games
Gold medal – first place	2017 Kuala Lumpur	Twenty20
- Source: Cricinfo, 12 February 2017

Rattana Sangsoma (born 2 June 1989) is a Thai cricketer. She played for the Thailand women's national cricket team in the 2017 Women's Cricket World Cup Qualifier in February 2017.
