= Cricket in Nepal =

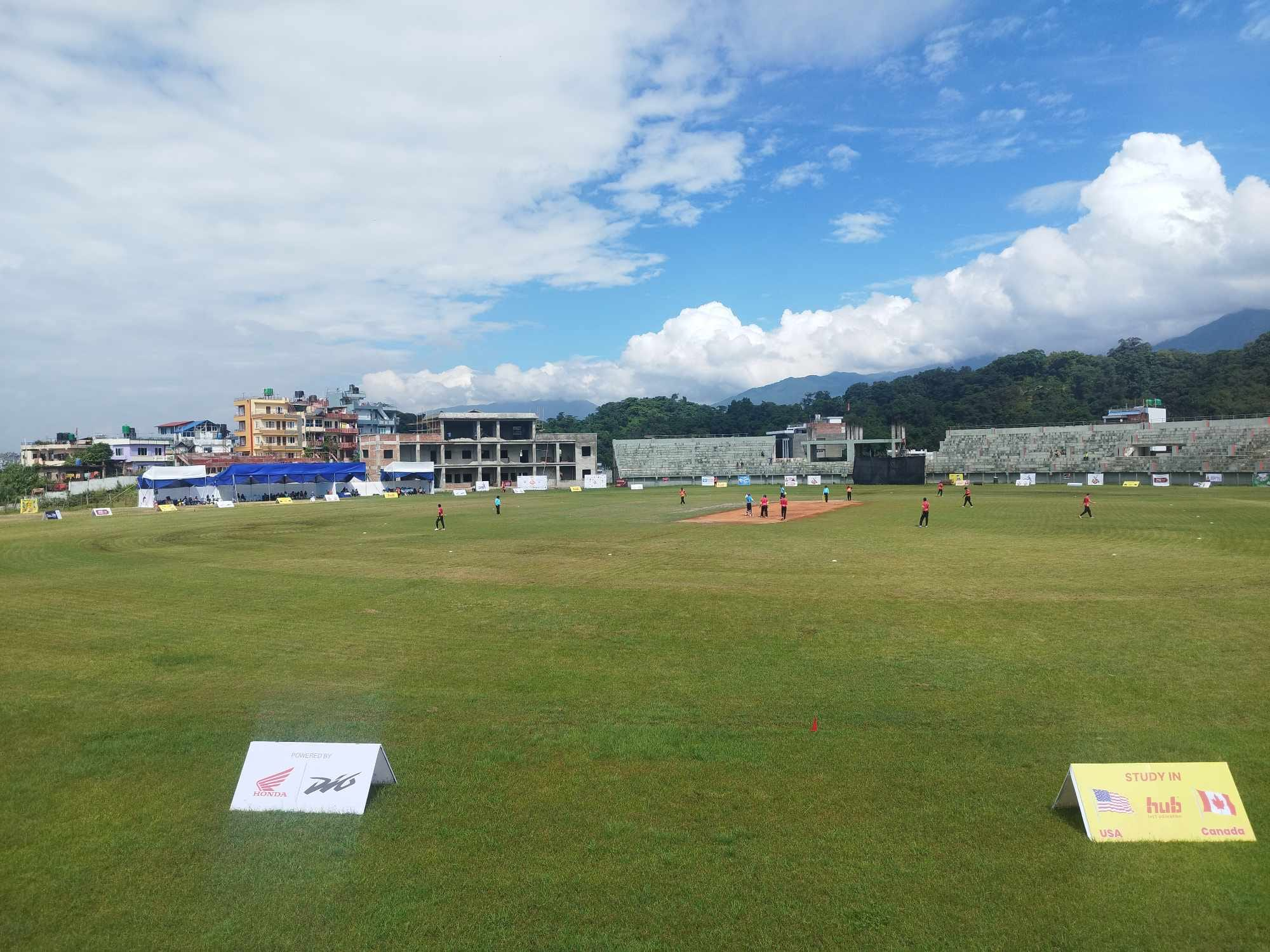
- Mulpani Cricket Stadium
- Country: Nepal
- Governing body: Cricket Association of Nepal (CAN)
- National teams: Nepal Men; Nepal Women; Nepal A men Nepal A women Nepal U-19 Men; Nepal U-19 women Nepal Blind's Men; Nepal Blind's Women; Nepal Deaf Men; Nepal Deaf Women
- First played: 1920
- Registered players: 35,000
- Clubs: 8 (NPL)

National competitions
- List: Senior Cricket Competition: Multi Day Cricket; Jay Trophy; List A Cricket; PM Cup; Women‘s Elite Cup; T20 Cricket; National T20 Championship; Women‘S PM Cup; U-19 Cricket Competition: List A Cricket; Men's Under-19 National Cricket Tournament; T20 Cricket; Maiyadevi Girls Under-19 Cup National Cricket Tournament; Sushil Koirala Memorial Under-19 Girls Cricket Tournament; U-16 Cricket Competition: List A Cricket; TB Shah Memorial U16 National Cricket Tournament; Manmohan Memorial U16 National Cricket Tournament; T20 Cricket; Girl's Under-16 National Cricket Championship; U-14 Cricket Competition: T20 Cricket; Men's Under 14 National Cricket Championship

Club competitions
- List: Nepal Premier League

International competitions
- List: National team; ICC World Twenty20: Group Stage (2014, 2024); ICC World Twenty20 Qualifier: Semi-finals (2013, 2022); ICC Men's T20 World Cup Asia Qualifier: Runners-up (2023); ICC Men's Cricket World Cup Qualifier: Playoffs (2014, 2018, 2023); ICC Cricket World Cup League 2: 3rd (2019-2023); ACC Men's Asia Cup: Group Stage (2023); ACC Men's Premier Cup: Champions (2023); Asian Games Cricket: Quarter-finals (2010, 2014, 2022); South Asian Games Cricket: Bronze Medal (2019); ACC Men's Emerging Teams Asia Cup: Group Stage(2013, 2017, 2019, 2023); U-19 national team; Under 19 Cricket World Cup: Super Six (2024); Under-19 Cricket World Cup Qualifier:Champions (2015, 2024); ACC Men's Under-19 Asia Cup: Semi-finals (2017); ACC Men's Under-19 Premier Cup: Champions (2023); Women's national team; ACC Women's Asia Cup: Group Stage (2012, 2016, 2024); ACC Women's Premier Cup: Semi-finals (2024); Asian Games Cricket: Quarter-finals (2014); South Asian Games Cricket: Bronze Medal (2019); ACC Women's Emerging Teams Asia Cup: Group Stage (2023)

Audience records
- Season: NPL 2024

Cricket in Nepal (Nepali: नेपालमा क्रिकेट) is the country's most popular and widely followed sport which has gained popularity over the years. It rapidly grew popularity in the mid-2010s, following the slight successes of the Nepalese cricket team as well as the country's explosive rise in social media and television viewing influence from neighbouring country India. It is played by many people throughout the country, especially in the Terai region.

The biggest cricketing achievement of the national cricket team was when the team reached the qualification tournament of 2014 ICC World T20 held in Bangladesh. Nepal's playing season runs from September to November and starts again in March before finishing in May. As of October 2023, there were 3,400 senior cricket clubs and over 35,000 registered players in Nepal.

== History ==
=== Beginnings ===
In 1920s Cricket was introduced to Nepal for the first time by Lt.-Gen.Madan Shumsher JBR youngest son of Rana Prime Minister Maharaja Chandra Shumsher Jang Bahadur Rana. But at the time, cricket was considered a "gentleman's game" so was limited to the ruling Rana family members and some elites of Nepal. Though the game was kept within themselves and other members of the elite, the Cricket Association of Nepal was formed in 1946 to promote cricket amongst the aristocracy.

After the introduction of democracy through the Revolution of 1951, cricket began to spread to the rest of the population. In 1961, in an effort to promote cricket to the whole of Nepal, the Cricket Association of Nepal became part of the National Sports Council. Nevertheless, the National games tended to be limited to Kathmandu until the 1980s.

=== ICC and ACC Membership ===
Improvements to the communication and transport infrastructure in Nepal allowed the game to expand outside Kathmandu in the 1980s, and Nepal became an Affiliate Member of the ICC in 1988. A major development programme began in the early 1990s, with regional and district tournaments established and cricket being promoted in the schools. Nepal became an Associate Member of the ACC in 1990 and became a full member in 1994.

Interest in cricket increased quickly in the 1990s, and demand to play was such that the number of teams in tournaments had to be restricted until more facilities could be built.

=== 1996-Present ===
Nepal became an Associate Member of the ICC in 1996, which was the year the national side played for the first time, in the ACC Trophy in Kuala Lumpur. Nepal finished fourth out of six teams in their first round group in this competition, beating Brunei and Japan. The achievement of this era was the historic win against Bangladesh in the 1999 ACC Trophy.

Nepal secured a 2002 Asia cup place but due to India Pakistan tension Asia cup didn't happen. During the 2004-2008 era Nepal U19 is at the peak. They beat New Zealand in the U19 World Cup. One of the significant turning points came in 2008 when they secured the ICC World Cricket League Division Five title.

Nepal played their first T20I World Cup in Bangladesh 2014 where they defeated Hong Kong and Afghanistan. Since then, Nepali cricket's fan following has been increasing day by day.

At 2016 U19 World Cup Nepal performed outstanding and reached quarter final. In 2018 Nepal secured an ODI status for the next 5 years after the win against PNG in ICC ODI World Cup Qualifier at Zimbabwe.

== Administration ==
Cricket Association of Nepal (CAN) is the official governing body of cricket in Nepal. Its headquarters is situated in Mulpani, Kathmandu. It is Nepal's representative at the International Cricket Council and remains an associate member since 1996 AD (2053 BS). It is also a member of the Asian Cricket Council (ACC).

The board was dissolved by the government of Nepal in November 2014 on the grounds of incompetence and a three-member ad hoc committee was established with a new president designated by the government itself.

In April 2016, CAN was suspended by the International Cricket Council (ICC), on the grounds of government interference in its operations. However the suspension did not prevent Nepal's national teams from participating in ICC tournaments.

The ICC welcomed the elections of the board held in September 2019 and formally reinstated the board on a conditional basis on 14 October. On 13 October 2019, the ICC lifted its suspension on the Cricket Association of Nepal.

== National teams ==
National teams of Nepal
- Nepal (Men's): Nepal (Women's)
- Nepal U-19 (Men's): Nepal U-19 (Women's)
- Nepal A Men: Nepal A women

The Nepal national cricket team is governed by the Cricket Association of Nepal (CAN) and is a member of the Asian Cricket Council (ACC). Since 1996 AD (2053 BS), the CAN has been affiliated with ICC, the international governing body for world cricket as an associate member. In 1990 AD (2047 BS), the CAN became one of the members of the ACC. There are other Nepali national teams, such as the Nepal A team and under-19 team.

=== Performance ===
The following list includes the performance of all of Nepal's national teams at major competitions.

==== Men's senior team ====
Tournament	Appearance in finals	Last appearance	Best performance
ICC Men's T20 World Cup	0 out of 9	2024	Group Stage (2014, 2024)
ICC World Twenty20 Qualifier	0 out of 7	2022	Semi-finals (2013, 2022)
2023 Men's T20 World Cup Asia Qualifier	1 out of 1	2023	Runners-up (2023)
ICC Men's Cricket World Cup Qualifier	0 out of 12	2023	Playoffs (2014, 2018, 2023)
ICC Cricket World Cup League 2	0 out of 1	2019-2023	3rd (2019-2023)
Asia Cup	0 out of 16	2023	Group Stage (2023)
ACC Men's Premier Cup	1 out of 2	2023	Champions (2023)
Asian Games	0 out of 3	2022	Quarter-finals (2010, 2014, 2022)
South Asian Games Cricket	0 out of 2	2019	Bronze Medal (2019)
ACC Men's Emerging Teams Asia Cup	0 out of 5	2023	Group Stage(2013, 2017, 2019, 2023)

==== Women's senior team ====
Tournament	Appearance in finals	Last appearance	Best performance
Women's Asia Cup	0 out of 9	2024	Group Stage (2012, 2016, 2024)
ACC Women's Premier Cup	0 out of 1	2024	Semi-finals (2024)
Asian Games Cricket	0 out of 3	2014	Quarter-finals (2014)
South Asian Games Cricket	0 out of 2	2019	Bronze Medal (2019)
ACC Women's Emerging Teams Asia Cup	0 out of 1	2023	Group Stage (2023)

==== Men's A team ====
Nepal A matches		List A matches			T20 matches			OTHERS matches		
Date	Opponent	W	L	D	W	L	NR/T	W	L	NR/T
18-22 February 2024	vs Canada XI	-	-	-	-	-	-	1	2	0
29 March-07 April 2024	vs Ireland Wolves	-	3	-	1	2	0	-	-	-

==== Men's U-19 team ====
Tournament	Appearance in finals	Last appearance	Best performance
Under-19 Cricket World Cup	0 out of 15	2024	Super Six (2024)
Under-19 Cricket World Cup Qualifier	9 out of 15	2024	Champions (2015, 2024)
ACC Under-19 Asia Cup	-	2023	Semi-finals (2017)
ACC Men's Under-19 Premier Cup	1 out of 3	2023	Champions (2023)

==== Wonen's U-19 team ====
Tournament	Appearance in finals	Last appearance	Best performance
Under-19 Women's T20 World Cup			
ACC Women's Under-19 Premier Cup			
Under-19 Cricket World Cup Qualifier	1 out of 2	2025	Champions (2025)
Women's Under-19 T20 Asia Cup			

==== Men's U-16 team ====
Tournament	Appearance in finals	Last appearance	Best performance
ACC Under-16 Elite Cup	2 out of 2	(2010, 2012)	Runner-up (2010, 2012)
ACC Under-16 Premier Cup	1 out of 1	(2014)	Champions (2014)
ACC Under-16 East Zone Cup	4 out of 4	(2017, 2019, 2023, 2025)	Champions (2017, 2019, 2023, 2025)

== Affiliated Province Cricket Associations ==
There are currently 7 provincial cricket associations and 45 district cricket associations affiliated with CAN.

Team	Logo	Province	Governing Body	Years	Men's				Women's			
Team	Logo	Province	Governing Body	Years	Senior	U-19	U-16	U-14	Senior	U-19	U-16	U-14
Koshi Province		Koshi Province	Koshi Province Cricket Association	2018–	check	check	check	check	check	check	check	X mark
Madhesh Province		Madhesh Province	Madhesh Province Cricket Association	2018–	check	check	check	check	check	check	check	X mark
Bagmati Province		Bagmati Province	Bagmati Province Cricket Association	2018–	check	check	check	check	check	check	check	X mark
Gandaki Province		Gandaki Province	Gandaki Province Cricket Association	2018–	check	check	check	check	check	check	check	X mark
Lumbini Province		Lumbini Province	Lumbini Province Cricket Association	2018–	check	check	check	check	check	check	check	X mark
Karnali Province		Karnali Province	Karnali Province Cricket Association	2018–	check	check	check	check	check	check	check	X mark
Sudurpaschim Province		Sudurpashchim Province	Sudurpashchim Province Cricket Association	2018–	check	check	check	check	check	check	check	X mark

== Organisation of cricket in modern Nepal ==
=== International cricket ===
==== Men's National Team ====
The Nepal National Cricket Team represents Nepal in international cricket matches.

Nepal have been participating in international cricket since 1996 when they competed in the 1996 ACC Trophy. They have competed in numerous tournaments over the years including the ICC Trophy (later the ICC World Cup Qualifier), the ICC Intercontinental Cup. The team gained T20 International status for the first time in 2013 after qualifying for the 2014 ICC World Twenty20 which was their first and only appearance at a major ICC event. The team also gained One Day International status in 2018 after finishing 8th in the 2018 Cricket World Cup Qualifier.

- One Day International- The Nepalese team took part in their first one-day international on 1 August 2018 against the Netherlands national team at the VRA Cricket Ground in Amstelveen and registered its first win two days later against them at the same ground. Nepal hosted its first one-day international against the United States national team at the Tribhuvan University Cricket Ground in Kirtipur on 8 February 2020. Nepal is currently competing in the 2019–22 ICC Cricket World Cup League 2 which is their first one-day international tournament.
- T20 International- Nepal faced Hong Kong in their first Twenty20 international game on 16 March 2014 at the 2014 ICC World Twenty20 which was their first and only appearance at a major ICC event. Nepal won two of their three matches in the tournament with wins against Hong Kong and Afghanistan and a loss against Bangladesh (their first international match against a full member) as they failed to make it past the first round on net run rate. Nepal holds permanent T20I since 1 January 2019 after a decision by the International Cricket Council to T20I status to all member nations.

==== Women's National Team ====
The Nepal national women's cricket team represents Nepal in international women's cricket matches. They made their international debut in the ACC Women's Tournament in Malaysia in July 2007. The women's team has competed in two Women's Asia Cup and regularly competes in Asian Cricket Council events. The women's team hold T20I status since 1 July 2018 after a decision by the International Cricket Council to give T20I status to all member nations.

=== Domestic Cricket ===
==== Men's Domestic Cricket ====
===== First Class competition =====
- Jay Trophy -

===== Limited overs competitions =====
- PM Cup -

===== Twenty20 competitions =====
- Nepal Premier League – The Nepal Premier League (NPL) (Nepali: नेपाल प्रिमियर लिग) also known as Siddhartha Bank NPL for sponsorship reason, is a men's professional T20 cricket league in Nepal. NPL is one of the major sports league in Nepal. Founded by the Cricket Association of Nepal (CAN), the league features eight provinces/cities-based franchise teams. The tournament will use a round-robin format, with the top teams advancing to the playoffs.
- National T20 Championship

===== Youth competitions =====
- Men's Under-19 National Cricket Tournament
- TB Shah Memorial U16 National Cricket Tournament
- Manmohan Memorial U16 National Cricket Tournament
- Under 14 National Cricket Championship

==== Women's Domestic Cricket ====
===== Twenty20 competitions =====
- Prime Minister Cup Women's National Tournament
- Lalitpur Mayor Women's Cup

===== Youth competitions =====
- Maiyadevi Girls Under-19 Cup National Cricket Tournament
- Sushil Koirala Memorial Under-19 Girls Cricket Tournament
- Girl's Under-16 National Cricket Championship

== Stadiums ==
There are 65 grounds in Nepal with 17 turf wickets, but international matches can be played only at the Tribhuvan University International Cricket Ground in Kirtipur and Upper Mulpani Cricket Ground on the outskirts of Kathmandu. The Pokhara International Cricket Stadium is the only other ground to host international cricket having hosted the women's tournament at the 2019 South Asian Games.

=== Active Stadiums ===
Ground	Photo	City	District	Province	Capacity	ODl		T20I		Notes
Ground	Photo	City	District	Province	Capacity	Matches	First match	Matches	First match	Notes
Tribhuvan University International Cricket Ground		Kirtipur	Kathmandu	Bagmati	15,000	34	5 February 2020	48	5 December 2019	
Mulpani International Cricket Ground		Kageshwari-Manohara	Kathmandu	Bagmati	4,000	1	29 April 2023	13	23 October 2023	
Pokhara International Cricket Stadium		Pokhara	Kaski	Gandaki	5,000+	0	Not Yet	4	2 December 2019	Proposed expansion

== International competitions hosted ==
Competition	Edition	Winner	Final	Runners-up	Nepal's position	Venues	Final venue	Stadium
Men's senior competitions
ICC Men's T20 World Cup Asia Qualifier	2023 (Regional Final)	Oman	184/9 (20 overs) – 184/6 (20 overs) Super Over: 21/0- 10/1	Nepal	Runners-up	2 (in 1 City)	Tribhuvan University International Cricket Ground	
ACC Premier Cup	2023	Nepal	118/3 (30.3 overs) – 117 (33.1 overs)	United Arab Emirates	Champions	2 (in 1 City)	Tribhuvan University International Cricket Ground	
Cricket at the South Asian Games	2019	Bangladesh	98/5 (16.1 overs) - 94/9 (20 overs)	Sri Lanka	Bronze	2 (in 1 city)	Tribhuvan University International Cricket Ground	
Women's senior competitions
Cricket at the South Asian Games	2019	Bangladesh	91/8 (20 overs) - 89/9 (20 overs)	Sri Lanka	Bronze	2 (in 1 city)	Pokhara International Cricket Stadium	

== Performance By Nepal national team in International competitions ==
A red box around the year indicates tournaments played within Nepal

Key
Champions
Runners-up
3rd position

=== Men's team ===
==== ICC Cricket World Cup ====
ICC Cricket World Cup record								Qualification record				
Host & Year	Round	Position	Pld	W	L	T	NR	Pld	W	L	T	NR
(England) 1975	Not eligible							Not eligible				
(England) 1979	Not eligible							Not eligible				
(England) (Wales) 1983	Not eligible							Not eligible				
(India) (Pakistan) 1987	Not eligible							Not eligible				
(Australia) (New Zealand) 1992	Not eligible							Not eligible				
(India) (Pakistan) (Sri Lanka) 1996	Not eligible							Not eligible				
(England) (Republic of Ireland) (Netherlands) (Scotland) (Wales) 1999	Not eligible							Not eligible				
(South Africa) (Kenya) (Zimbabwe) 2003	Did not qualify							5	4	1	0	0
(Cricket West Indies) 2007	Not eligible							Not eligible				
(Bangladesh) (India) (Sri Lanka) 2011	Not eligible							Not eligible				
(Australia) (New Zealand) 2015	Did not qualify							16	9	7	0	0
(England) (Wales) 2019	Did not qualify							35	17	17	0	1
(India) 2023	Did not qualify							36	19	15	1	1
(Namibia) (South Africa) (Zimbabwe) 2027	TBD											
(Bangladesh) (India) 2031	TBD											

==== ICC T20 World Cup ====
Host & Year	Round	Position	GP	W	L	T	NR
(South Africa) 2007	Not eligible						
(England) 2009	Not eligible						
(Cricket West Indies) 2010	Not eligible						
(Sri Lanka) 2012	Did not qualify						
(Bangladesh) 2014	Group Stage	12/16	3	2	1	0	0
(India) 2016	Did not qualify						
(Oman) (United Arab Emirates) 2021	Did not qualify						
(Australia) 2022	Did not qualify						
(United States) (Cricket West Indies) 2024	Group Stage	17/20	4	0	3	0	1
(India) (Sri Lanka) 2026	Currently Running						
(Australia) (New Zealand) 2028	TBD						
(England) (Republic of Ireland) (Scotland) 2030	TBD						
Total	Group Stage (2014, 2024)	2/9	7	2	4	0	1

==== ICC Cricket World Cup Qualifier ====
Host & Year	Round	Position	P	W	L	T	NR	Notes
(England) 1979	Not eligible – Not an ICC member							
(England) 1982	Not eligible – Not an ICC member							
(England) 1986	Not eligible – Not an ICC member							
(Netherlands) 1990	Not eligible – ICC affiliate member							
(Kenya) 1994	Not eligible – ICC affiliate member							
(Malaysia) 1997	Did not participate							
(Canada) 2001	Group stage	Round 1	5	4	1	0	0	
(Ireland) 2005	Did not qualify							
(South Africa) 2009	Not eligible – In Division Five							
(New Zealand) 2014	Playoffs	9th	6	1	5	0	0	Relegated to 2014 Division 3
(Zimbabwe) 2018	Playoffs	8th	6	2	4	0	0	Gained ODI status until 2023
(Zimbabwe) 2023	Playoffs	8th	6	2	4	0	0	Had retained ODI status until 2027
Total			23	9	14	0	0	

==== ICC T20 World Cup Qualifier ====
Host & Year	Round	Position	P	W	L	T	NR	Notes
(Ireland) 2008	Did not participate							
(United Arab Emirates) 2010	Did not participate							
(United Arab Emirates) 2012	7th-10th Playoff Stage	7th	9	5	4	0	0	
(United Arab Emirates) 2013	Semi Final	3rd	10	6	4	0	0	Qualified for the 2014 ICC World Twenty20
(Ireland) (Scotland) 2015	Group Stage	12th	6	1	4	0	1	
(United Arab Emirates) 2019	Did not qualify							
(Oman) 2022	Semi Final	3rd	5	4	1	0	0	
(Nepal) 2023	Runners-up	2nd	5	3	1	1	0	Qualified for the 2024 ICC Men's T20 World Cup
Total			35	18	14	1	1	

==== Asia Cup ====
Host & Year	Round	Position	Pld	W	L	T	NR
(United Arab Emirates) 1984	Not Eligible						
(Sri Lanka) 1986	Not Eligible						
(Bangladesh) 1988	Not Eligible						
(India) 1990–91	Not Eligible						
(United Arab Emirates) 1995	Not Eligible						
(Sri Lanka) 1997	did not qualify						
(Bangladesh) 2000	did not participate						
(Sri Lanka) 2004	did not qualify						
(Pakistan) 2008	did not qualify						
(Sri Lanka) 2010	did not participate						
(Bangladesh) 2012	did not participate						
(Bangladesh) 2014	did not qualify						
(Bangladesh) 2016	did not participate						
(United Arab Emirates) 2018	did not qualify						
(United Arab Emirates) 2022	did not qualify						
(Pakistan) (Sri Lanka) 2023	Group Stage	5th/6th	2	0	2	0	0

==== Asia Cup Qualifier ====
Host & Year	Tournament	Position	P	W	L	T	N/R	Notes
(Malaysia) 2014	ACC Premier League	3rd	5	3	2	0	0	Qualified for 2014 ACC Championship, but the tournament was cancelled.
(Bangladesh) 2016	Asia Cup Qualifier	did not participate						Had no T20I status
(Malaysia) 2018	Asia Cup Qualifier	4th	5	2	3	0	0	Qualified for the 2019 ACC Emerging Teams Asia Cup
(Oman) 2020	Asia Cup Qualifier	did not qualify						Setback in eastern regional qualifier
(Nepal) 2023	ACC Premier Cup	Champions	6	5	0	0	1	Qualified for the 2023 Asia Cup and 2023 ACC Emerging Teams Asia Cup
(Oman) 2024	ACC Premier Cup	4th	6	4	2	0	0	

==== Asian Games ====
Year	Position	GP	W	L	T	N/R	Notes
(China) 2010	Quarter-finals	3	1	2	-	-	Knocked out by Sri-Lanka in the Quarter-Final
(South Korea) 2014	Quarter-finals	3	2	1	-	-	Knocked out by Afghanistan in the Quarter-Final
(China) 2022	Quarter-finals	3	2	1	-	-	Knocked out by India in the Quarter-Final

==== World Cricket League / Cricket World Cup League 2 ====
Year	Position	GP	W	L	T	N/R	Notes
2008 ICC World Cricket League Division Five	3rd place	7	5	1	0	1	Remained in 2010 Division Five
2010 ICC World Cricket League Division Five	Champions	6	5	1	0	0	Promoted to Division Four for 2010
2010 ICC World Cricket League Division Four	3rd place	6	4	2	0	0	Remained in Division Four for 2012
2012 ICC World Cricket League Division Four	Champions	6	6	0	0	0	Promoted to Division Three for 2013
2013 ICC World Cricket League Division Three	Champions	6	4	2	0	0	Promoted to the 2014 World Cup Qualifier
2014 ICC World Cricket League Division Three	Champions	6	5	1	0	0	Promoted to Division Two for 2015
2015 Division Two	4th place	6	3	3	0	0	Qualified for the 2015-17 ICC World Cricket League Championship
2015–17 ICC World Cricket League Championship	7th place	14	4	9	0	1	Relegated to Division Two
2018 ICC World Cricket League Division Two	Runners-Up	6	4	2	0	0	Advanced to the 2018 Cricket World Cup Qualifier
2019–2023 Cricket World Cup League 2	3rd	36	19	15	1	1	Advanced to the 2023 Cricket World Cup Qualifier and retained ODI status until 2027
2024–2026 Cricket World Cup League 2	On Going						

==== South Asian Games ====
Host & Year	Position	GP	W	L	T	N/R
(Nepal) 2019	Bronze	5	3	2	0	0

ACC Emerging Team Asia Cup (List A Tournaments)
Host & Year	Tournament	Position	GP	W	L	T	NR
(Singapore) 2013	2013 ACC Emerging Teams Cup	Group Stage	3	0	3	0	0
(Bangladesh) 2017	2017 ACC Emerging Teams Asia Cup	Group Stage	3	1	2	0	0
(Pakistan) (Sri Lanka) 2018	2018 ACC Emerging Teams Asia Cup	Did not Qualify					
(Bangladesh) 2019	2019 ACC Emerging Teams Asia Cup	Group Stage	3	1	2	0	0
(Sri Lanka) 2023	2023 ACC Emerging Teams Asia Cup	Group Stage	3	1	2	0	0

ICC Intercontinental Cup (First Class Tournament)
Year	Tournament	Position	GP	W	L	D	points
2004	2004 ICC Intercontinental Cup	Group Stage- Asia Group	2	1	0	1	42
2005	2005 ICC Intercontinental Cup	Group Stage- Asia Group	2	1	0	1	40.5
2006-07	2006–07 ICC Intercontinental Cup	Did not qualify					
2007-08	2007–08 ICC Intercontinental Cup	Did not qualify					
2009-10	2009–10 ICC Intercontinental Cup	Did not qualify					
2011-13	2011–2013 ICC Intercontinental Cup	Did not qualify					
2015-17	2015–2017 ICC Intercontinental Cup	Did not qualify					

ACC Fast Track Countries Tournament record
Year	Tournament	Position
2006	ACC Fast Track Countries Tournament	Winners

ACC Trophy record (50 Over Tournament)
Year	Tournament	Position
1996	1996 ACC Trophy	First round
1998	1998 ACC Trophy	First round
2000	2000 ACC Trophy	Semi-finals
2002	2002 ACC Trophy	Runners-up
2004	2004 ACC Trophy	5th place
2006	2006 ACC Trophy	4th place
2008	2008 ACC Trophy Elite	4th place
2010	2010 ACC Trophy Elite	Runners-up
2012	2012 ACC Trophy Elite	Winners (Shared trophy with United Arab Emirates national cricket team

=== Women's team ===
==== Women's World Cup ====
World Cup record
Year	Round	Position	GP	W	L	T	NR
(England) 1973	Not an ICC member						
(India) 1978	Not an ICC member						
(New Zealand) 1982	Not an ICC member						
(Australia) 1988	Not an ICC member						
(England) 1993	Not an ICC member						
(India) 1997	No women's ODI status						
(New Zealand) 2000	No women's ODI status						
(South Africa) 2005	No women's ODI status						
(Australia) 2009	No women's ODI status						
(India) 2013	No women's ODI status						
(England) 2017	No women's ODI status						
(New Zealand) 2022	No women's ODI status						
(India) 2025	No women's ODI status						
Total	0/13	0 Titles	0	0	0	0	0

==== Women's World T20 ====
Twenty20 World Cup Record
Year	Round	Position	GP	W	L	T	NR
(England) 2009	Did not qualify						
(Cricket West Indies) 2010	Did not qualify						
(Sri Lanka) 2012	Did not qualify						
(Bangladesh) 2014	Did not qualify						
(India) 2016	Did not qualify						
(Cricket West Indies) 2018	Did not qualify						
(Australia) 2020	Did not qualify						
(South Africa) 2023	Did not qualify						
(Bangladesh) 2024	Did not qualify						
(England) 2026	TBD						
Total	0/10	0 Titles	0	0	0	0	0

==== ICC Women's T20 World Cup Qualifier ====
ICC Women's World Twenty20 Qualifier
Year	Round	Position	GP	W	L	T	NR
(Republic of Ireland) 2013	Did not qualify						
(Thailand) 2015	Did not qualify						
(Netherlands) 2018	Did not qualify						
(Scotland) 2019	Did not qualify						
(United Arab Emirates) 2022	Did not qualify						
(United Arab Emirates) 2024	Did not qualify						
Total	0/6	0 Titles	0	0	0	0	0

==== ICC Women's T20 World Cup Asia Qualifier ====
- 2016: 2nd (DNQ)
- 2017: 3rd (DNQ)
- 2019: 2nd (DNQ)
- 2021: 3rd (DNQ)
- 2023: Semi finalist (DNQ)

==== Asia Cup ====
Year	Round	Position	GP	W	L	T	NR
2004 (Sri Lanka)	did not enter (ODI format)						
2005-06 (Pakistan)	did not enter (ODI format)						
2006 (India)	did not enter (ODI format)						
2008 (Sri Lanka)	did not enter (ODI format)						
2012 (China)	Group stage	7/8	3	0	3	0	0
2016 (Thailand)	Group stage	6/8	5	0	5	0	0
2018 (Malaysia)	did not qualify (T20I format)						
2022 (Bangladesh)	did not qualify (T20I format)						
2024 (Sri Lanka)	Qualified						
Total	3/9	0 Titles	8	0	8	0	0

==== ACC Women's Tournament ====
Year	Round	Position	Played	Won	Lost	Tie	NR
ACC Women's Tournament
2007 (Malaysia)	Runners-Up	2/8	5	4	1	0	0
ACC Women's Twenty20 Championship
2009 (Malaysia)	Semi-finals	3/12	7	5	2	0	0
2011 (Kuwait)	Semi-finals	4/10	6	4	2	0	0
ACC Women's Championship
2013 (Thailand)	Semi-finals	3/11	6	5	1	0	0
ACC Women's Premier
2014 (Thailand)	Group Stage	4/6	5	2	3	0	0
Total	Runners-up	5/5	29	20	9	0	0

==== ACC Women's Premier Cup ====
ACC Women's Premier Cup Record
Year	Round	Position	GP	W	L	T	NR
2024 (Malaysia)	Semi-finals	3/16	5	4	1	0	0
Total	1/1	0 Titles	5	4	1	0	0

==== Asian Games ====
Year	Round	Position	Played	Won	Lost	Tie	NR
2010 (China)	First Round	5/8	3	1	2	0	0
2014 (South Korea)	Quarter-finals	5/10	3	1	2	0	0
Total	Quarter-finals	2/2	6	2	4	0	0

==== South Asian Games ====
Year	Round	Position	Played	Won	Lost	Tie	NR
2019 (Nepal)	Third Place	3/4	4	2	2	0	0

=== Men's U-19 team ===
==== U-19 World Cup ====
Nepal's U19 World Cup record
Year	Result	Position	P	W	L	D	NR
(Australia) 1988	Did not enter (no team)						
(South Africa) 1998	Did not participate						
(Sri Lanka) 2000	Second Round	8/16	6	1	3	0	2
(New Zealand) 2002	First Round	10/16	8	6	2	0	0
(Bangladesh) 2004	First Round	13/16	6	3	3	0	0
(Sri Lanka) 2006	First Round	9/16	6	4	2	0	0
(Malaysia) 2008	First Round	10/16	6	3	3	0	0
(New Zealand) 2010	Did not qualify						
(Australia) 2012	First Round	13/16	6	2	4	0	0
(United Arab Emirates) 2014	Did not qualify						
(Bangladesh) 2016	Quarter-finals	8/16	6	2	4	0	0
(New Zealand) 2018	Did not qualify						
(South Africa) 2020	Did not qualify						
(Cricket West Indies) 2022	Did not qualify						
(South Africa) 2024	Super Six	11/16	5	1	4	0	0
(Namibia) (Zimbabwe) 2026							
Total	Quarter-finals	8/16	49	22	25	0	2

==== Under-19 World Cup Qualifier ====
Year	Result	Position	P	W	L	D	NR	Remarks
(Canada) 2009	Did not qualify							
2011	Round Robin	2/10	9	7	2	0	0	Qualified for 2012 Under-19 World Cup
(Malaysia) 2015	Winners	1/5	5	5	0	0	0	Qualified for 2016 Under-19 World Cup
Asia Division 1
(Singapore) 2017	Round Robin	2/4	6	4	2	0	0	Did not qualify
(Malaysia) 2019	Round Robin	2/6	5	4	1	0	0	Did not qualify
(United Arab Emirates) 2021	Qualification cancelled due to Covid-19							Did not qualify
(United Arab Emirates) 2024	Winners	1/5	5	5	0	0	0	Qualified for 2024 Under-19 World Cup
(Nepal) 2026								
Total	2 Titles	5/6	30	25	5	0	0	Qualified on Multiple Occasions

==== ACC Under-19 Championship ====
Year	Result	Position	P	W	L	D	NR
Youth Asia Cup
(Hong Kong) 1997	Second Round	4/8	6	2	4	0	0
(Singapore) 1999	Runners-up	2/8	5	2	1	0	2
(Nepal) 2001	Champions						
(Pakistan) 2003	Champions	1/10	6	4	0	0	2
ACC U-19 Cup
(Nepal) 2005	Champions	1/15	5	5	0	0	0
ACC U-19 Elite
(Malaysia) 2007	Champions	1/10	6	5	0	0	1
(Kuwait) 2009	Semi-final	3/10	6	4	2	0	0
(Thailand) 2011	Runners-up	2/10	6	5	1	0	0
(Malaysia) 2013	Semi-final	4/10	6	4	2	0	0
ACC U-19 Premier
(Kuwait) 2014	Runners-up	2/6	5	4	1	0	0
(Malaysia) 2015	Runners-up	2/6	5	4	1	0	0
ACC U-19 Eastern Region
(Malaysia) 2017	Champions	1/8	5	5	0	0	0
(Malaysia) 2019	Champions	1/7	4	4	0	0	0

==== ACC Under-19 Asia Cup ====
Year	Result	Position	P	W	L	D	NR
(Bangladesh) 1989	Did not enter (no team)						
(Pakistan) 2003	Did not participate						
(Malaysia) 2012	Group Stage	6/8	3	1	2	0	0
(United Arab Emirates) 2013/14	Group Stage	6/8	3	1	2	0	0
(Sri Lanka) 2016	Group Stage	6/8	3	1	2	0	0
(Malaysia) 2017	Semi-Final	4/8	4	2	2	0	0
(Bangladesh) 2018	Group Stage	6/8	3	1	2	0	0
(Sri Lanka) 2019	Group Stage	5/8	3	1	2	0	0
(United Arab Emirates) 2021	Group Stage	7/8	3	0	3	0	0
(United Arab Emirates) 2023	Group Stage	7/8	3	0	3	0	0
(United Arab Emirates) 2024	Group Stage	6/8	3	1	2	0	0
Total	Semi-Final	6/8	28	8	20	0	0

=== Women's U-19 team ===
==== Under-19 Women's World Cup ====
Nepal's U19 World Cup record
Year	Host(s)	Tournament	Result	Position	P	W	L	D	NR
2023	(South Africa)	2023 Under-19 Women's T20 World Cup	Did not qualify						
2025	(Malaysia)	2025 Under-19 Women's T20 World Cup	Qualified						
2027	(Bangladesh) (Nepal)	2027 Under-19 Women's T20 World Cup	Qualified as a Host nation						

==== Under-19 Women's Asia Cup ====
Nepal's Under-19 Twenty20 Asia Cup Record
Year	Result	Pos	№	Pld	W	L	T	NR
(Malaysia) 2024	Super Four	3rd place, bronze medalist(s)	6	4	1	1	0	2
Total				4	1	1	0	2

==== Under-19 Women's T20 Qualifier ====
Year	Host(s)	Tournament	Result	Position	P	W	L	D	NR	Remarks
2022	(Malaysia)	2022 ICC Under-19 Women's T20 World Cup qualification Asia	Round Robin	3/6	5	3	2	0	0	Did not qualified for 2023 Under-19 Women's T20 World Cup
2025	(United Arab Emirates)	2025 ICC Under-19 Women's T20 World Cup qualification Asia	Round Robin	1/4	6	5	1	0	0	Qualified for 2025 Under-19 Women's T20 World Cup
2027	(Bangladesh) (Nepal)	2027 ICC Under-19 Women's T20 World Cup qualification	Qualified as a Host Nation							Qualify for 2027 Under-19 Women's T20 World Cup

== Cricket Broadcast in Nepal ==
=== Domestic competitions ===
==== Domestic franchise cricket ====
List of current broadcasters:

Competition	Period	Television Rights		Streaming Rights	
Competition	Period	Conglomerate	Network	Conglomerate	Platform
Nepal Premier League	2025	JioStar	Star Sports	DishHome	DishHome Go
Nepal Premier League	2025	Kantipur Television Network Pvt. Ltd	Kantipur Max	DishHome	DishHome Go

==== Domestic Provincial cricket ====
List of current broadcasters:

Competition		Period	Television Rights		Streaming Rights	
Competition		Period	Conglomerate	Network	Conglomerate	Platform
First Class Cricket	Jay Trophy	2025	None		DishHome	DishHome Go; Action Sports HD; CAN Youtube Channel
List A Cricket	PM Cup	2025	None		CAN	CAN Youtube Channel
T20 Cricket	National T20 Championship	2025	None		CAN	CAN Youtube Channel
T20 Cricket	Women's PM Cup	2025	None		CAN	CAN Youtube Channel

==== Domestic Provincial franchise cricket ====
List of current broadcasters:

Competition	Period	Television Rights		Streaming Rights	
Competition	Period	Conglomerate	Network	Conglomerate	Platform
Madhesh Premier League					
Pokhara Premier League					
Dhangadhi Premier League					
Koshi Premier League					
Saptari Premier League					

=== International competitions ===
==== International Cricket (Home) ====
List of current broadcasters:

Competition	Period	Television Rights		Streaming Rights	
Competition	Period	Conglomerate	Network	Conglomerate	Platform
International Cricket In Nepal	2025	Kantipur Television Network	Kantipur Television	Routine of Nepal Banda	Routine of Nepal Banda

==== International Cricket (Away) ====
List of current broadcasters:

Competition	Period	Television Rights		Streaming Rights	
Competition	Period	Conglomerate	Network	Conglomerate	Platform
International Cricket Council	2024–2027	JioStar	Star Sports	None	
International Cricket in Australia	2023-2030	JioStar	Star Sports	None	
International Cricket In India	2023–2028	JioStar	Star Sports	None	
International Cricket in South Africa	2024–2031	JioStar	Star Sports	None	
Asian Cricket Council	2024-2031	Culver Max Entertainment	Sony Sports Network	None	
International Cricket in England	2022–2028	Culver Max Entertainment	Sony Sports Network	None	
International Cricket in Sri Lanka	2023–2027	Culver Max Entertainment	Sony Sports Network	None	
International Cricket in New Zealand	2024-2031	Culver Max Entertainment	Sony Sports Network	None	
International Cricket in Pakistan	2025	Culver Max Entertainment	Sony Sports Network	None	
International Cricket in Zimbabwe	2024	Prasar Bharati	DD Sports	None	
International Cricket in West Indies	2021-2024	Prasar Bharati	DD Sports	None	
International Cricket in Bangladesh	2025	Prasar Bharati	DD Sports	None	
International Cricket in Afghanistan	2024-2027	WBD India	Eurosport India	None	

==== International franchise cricket ====
List of current broadcasters:

Country (or) Confederation	Competition	Period	Television Rights		Streaming Rights	
Country (or) Confederation	Competition	Period	Conglomerate	Network	Conglomerate	Platform
Afghanistan	Afghanistan Premier League	2024-2027	WBD India	Eurosport India	None	
Australia	Big Bash League	2023–2030	Jio Star	Star Sports	None	
Australia	Women's Big Bash League	2023–2030	Jio Star	Star Sports	None	
Canada	Global T20 Canada	2024	Jio Star	Star Sports	None	
England	The Hundred	2025	Culver Max Entertainment	Sony Sports Network	None	
England	The Women's Hundred	2025	Culver Max Entertainment	Sony Sports Network	None	
India	Indian Premier League	2023–2027	Jio Star	Star Sports	None	
India	Women's Premier League	2023–2027	Jio Star	Star Sports	None	
South Africa	SA20	2023–2033	Jio Star	Star Sports	None	
Sri Lanka	Lanka Premier League	2024	Jio Star	Star Sports	None	
Sri Lanka	Lanka T10	2024	Jio Star	Star Sports	None	
United Arab Emirates	International League T20	2023–2032	Zee Entertainment Enterprises	Zee Network	None	
United Arab Emirates	Abu Dhabi T10	2024	JioStar	Star Sports	None	
United States	Major League Cricket	2025	JioStar	Star Sports	None	
United States	US Masters T10	2024	JioStar	Star Sports	None	
West Indies	Caribbean Premier League	2024	JioStar	Star Sports	None	
West Indies	Women's Caribbean Premier League	2024	JioStar	Star Sports	None	
West Indies	Global Super League	2025	Culver Max Entertainment	Sony Sports Network	None	
Zimbabwe	Zim Afro T10	2024	JioStar	Star Sports	None	

== See also ==
- Cricket Association of Nepal
- Nepal national cricket team
- Nepal national women's cricket team
- Nepal national under-19 cricket team
- National League
- Nepal Premier League
- List of cricket grounds in Nepal
- National League Cricket
- Asian Challenger Trophy
