= 2023 KP Oli Cup (cricket) =

Cricket tournament in Nepal

- Dates: 23 November 2023 – 1 December 2023
- Administrator(s): Cricket Association of Nepal; Madan Bhandari Sports Foundation
- Cricket format: Twenty20
- Tournament format(s): Round-robin and Knockout
- Host(s): Nepal
- Champions: Madhesh Province (1st title)
- Runners-up: Tribhuwan Army Club
- Participants: 12
- Matches: 15
- Player of the series: Harishankar Shah (Madhesh Province)
- Most runs: Rit Gautam (170) (Bagmati Province)
- Most wickets: Sandeep Lamichhane (10) (Bagmati Province); Shahab Alam (10) (Tribhuwan Army Club); Harishankar Shah (10) (Madhesh Province)

The 2023 KP Oli Cup was the inaugural edition of the KP Oli Cup, the domestic T20 tournament in Nepal. The tournament was contested by teams representing the seven Provinces of Nepal, three departmental teams as well as two organizer teams. It began on 23 November 2023 and ended on 1 December 2023.

Tribhuwan Army Club secured a place in the final after defeating Bagmati Province in the 1st semi-final and Madhesh Province secured their place in final after defeating heavy weight APF Club in the 2nd semi-final.

Madhesh Province became the champion after defeating undefeated tournament favorites Tribhuwam Army Club in the final.

== Squads ==
The twelve participants were divided into four groups.

== Group Stage ==
=== Group A ===
==== Points table ====
Pos	Team	Pld	W	L	NR	Pts	NRR
1	Bagmati Province	2	2	0	0	4	4.975
2	Karnali Province	2	1	1	0	2	−1.948
3	Madan Bhandari Sports Academy (Red)	2	0	2	0	0	−3.129

Source: ESPNcricinfo

Advance to the knockout stage

==== Fixtures ====
23 November 2023
13:00
Scorecard

Bagmati Province; 184/7 (20 overs)	v	Madan Bhandari Sports Academy (Red); 75 (14.2 overs)
Rit Gautam 74 (53); Biprason KC 3/39 (3 overs)		Amar Mishra 13 (8); Sandeep Lamichhane 4/16 (4 overs)

Bagmati Province won by 109 runs
Pokhara International Cricket Stadium, Pokhara
Umpires: Boj Raj Baral and Sanjay Sigdel
Player of the match: Rit Gautam (Bagmati Province)

- Madan Bhandari Sports Academy (Red) won the toss and elected to field.

24 November 2023
09:00
Scorecard

Bagmati Province; 189/6 (20 overs)	v	Karnali Province; 99 (17.3 overs)
Rit Gautam 82 (59); Dinesh Adhikari 3/33 (4 overs)		Arjun Gharti 24 (23); Sandeep Lamichhane 4/9 (3.3 overs)

Bagmati Province won by 90 runs
Pokhara International Cricket Stadium, Pokhara
Umpires: D Agrahari and Sanjay Sigdel
Player of the match: Ishan Pandey (Bagmati Province)

- Bagmati Province won the toss and elected to bat.

25 November 2023
09:00
Scorecard

Madan Bhandari Sports Academy (Red); 109/6 (20 overs)	v	Karnali Province; 111/6 (18.1 overs)
Roshan Gautam 30* (20); Prakash Jaishi 2/24 (4 overs)		Dipendra Rawat 43* (31); Santosh Yadav 2/8 (4 overs)

Karnali Province won by 4 wickets
Pokhara International Cricket Stadium, Pokhara
Umpires: Bhoj Raj Baral and Rabindra Gupta
Player of the match: Dipendra Rawat (Karnali Province)

- Madan Bhandari Sports Academy (Red) won the toss and elected to bat.

=== Group B ===
==== Points table ====
Pos	Team	Pld	W	L	NR	Pts	NRR
1	APF Club	2	1	1	0	2	1.989
2	Gandaki Province	2	1	1	0	2	−0.008
3	Lumbini Province	2	1	1	0	2	−1.975

Source: ESPNcricinfo

Advance to the knockout stage

==== Fixtures ====
24 November 2023
13:00
Scorecard

APF Club; 101 (18.4 overs)	v	Gandaki Province; 104/6 (19.4 overs)
Pradeep Airee 20 (23); Kamal Pariyar 2/17 (3.4 overs)		Muskhan Thapa 25 (23); Abinash Bohara 2/12 (4 overs)

Gandaki Province won by 4 wickets
Pokhara International Cricket Stadium, Pokhara
Umpires: Rajendra Gupta and Vinay Kumar Jha
Player of the match: Amrit Gurung (Gandaki Province)

- Gandaki Province won the toss and elected to field.

25 November 2023
13:00
Scorecard

APF Club; 151/7 (20 overs)	v	Lumbini Province; 67/9 (20 overs)
Lokesh Bam 32* (13); Avishek Gautam 2/17 (4 overs)		Mirnal Gurung 14 (22); Arun Airee 5/7 (4 overs)

APF Club won by 84 runs
Pokhara International Cricket Stadium, Pokhara
Umpires: Vinay Kumar Jha and Sanjay Sigdel
Player of the match: Arun Airee (APF Club)

- APF Club won the toss and elected to bat.

26 November 2023
09:00
Scorecard

Lumbini Province; 103/8 (20 overs)	v	Gandaki Province; 98 (18.5 overs)
Nar Sarki 23 (17); Amrit Gurung 3/25 (4 overs)		Sudip Aryal 35 (24); Md Hussain 4/9 (3.5 overs)

Lumbini Province won by 5 runs
Pokhara International Cricket Stadium, Pokhara
Umpires: Rabindra Gupta and Vinay Kumar Jha
Player of the match: MD Hussain (Lumbini Province)

- Gandaki Province won the toss and elected to field.

=== Group C ===
==== Points table ====
Pos	Team	Pld	W	L	NR	Pts	NRR
1	Madhesh Province	2	1	1	0	2	1.472
2	Nepal Police Club	2	1	1	0	2	1.084
3	Sudurpashchim Province	2	1	1	0	2	−4.956

Source: ESPNcricinfo

Advance to the knockout stage

==== Fixtures ====
26 November 2023
13:00
Scorecard

Nepal Police Club; 175/5 (20 overs)	v	Madhesh Province; 118 (18.2 overs)
Kushal Bhurtel 102 (57); Bishal Shusling 2/14 (3 overs)		Rupesh Singh 40 (25); Sagar Dhakal 2/10 (4 overs)

Nepal Police Club won by 57 runs
Pokhara International Cricket Stadium, Pokhara
Umpires: Vinay Kumar Jha and Sanjay Sigdel
Player of the match: Kushal Bhurtel (Nepal Police Club)

- Nepal Police Club won the toss and elected to bat.

27 November 2023
09:00
Scorecard

Sudurpashchim Province; 58 (15.5 overs)	v	Madhesh Province; 62/2 (4.4 overs)
Naren Saud 18 (22); Harishankar Shah 4/11 (4 overs)		Anil Sah 25 (11); Gajendra Bohara 2/17 (2 overs)

Madhesh Province won by 8 wickets
Pokhara International Cricket Stadium, Pokhara
Umpires: D Agrahari and Vinay Kumar Jha
Player of the match: Harishankar Shah (Madhesh Province)

- Sudurpashchim Province won the toss and elected to bat.

28 November 2023
09:00
Scorecard

Nepal Police Club; 158/4 (20 overs)	v	Sudurpashchim Province; 162/6 (18.4 overs)
Kushal Bhurtel 67 (51); Bikash Aagri 2/37 (4 overs)		Kiran Thagunna 51* (34); Rashid Khan 3/27 (4 overs)

Sudurpashchim Province won by 4 wickets
Pokhara International Cricket Stadium, Pokhara
Umpires: Rabindra Gupta and Sanjay Sigdel
Player of the match: Kiran Thagunna (Sudurpaschim Province)

=== Group D ===
==== Points table ====
Pos	Team	Pld	W	L	NR	Pts	NRR
1	Tribhuwan Army Club	2	2	0	0	4	3.725
2	Koshi Province	2	1	1	0	2	1.446
3	Madan Bhandari Sports Academy (Blue)	2	0	2	0	0	−5.706

Source: ESPNcricinfo

Advance to the knockout stage

==== Fixtures ====
27 November 2023
13:00
Scorecard

Tribhuwan Army Club; 195/6 (20 overs)	v	Madan Bhandari Sports Academy (Blue); 85 (15.4 overs)
Santosh Karki 41 (35); Mehool Shrestha 2/25 (4 overs)		Nirbhik Pathak 28 (23); Kushal Malla 3/2 (1.4 overs)

Tribhuwan Army Club won by 110 runs
Pokhara International Cricket Stadium, Pokhara
Umpires: Bhoj Raj Baral and Rabindra Gupta
Player of the match: Kushal Malla (Tribhuwan Army Club)

- Madan Bhandari Sports Academy (Blue) won the toss and elected to field.

28 November 2023
13:00
Scorecard

Tribhuwan Army Club; 186/7 (20 overs)	v	Koshi Province; 147 (18.2 overs)
Bhim Sharki 53 (24); Sarwan Yadav 3/32 (4 overs)		Sonu Ansari 44 (33); Sompal Kami 2/23 (3 overs)

Tribhuwan Army Club won by 39 runs
Pokhara International Cricket Stadium, Pokhara
Umpires: D Agrahari and Vinay Kumar Jha
Player of the match: Bhim Sharki (Tribuwan Army Club)

- Tribhuwan Army Club won the toss and elected to bat.

29 November 2023
09:00
Scorecard

Madan Bhandari Sports Academy (Blue); 67 (17.5 overs)	v	Koshi Province; 68/1 (7.4 overs)
Arjun Raymajhi 24 (25); Sarwan Yadav 3/8 (3.5 overs)		Sonu Ansari 35* (22); Subham Khanal 1/19 (1.4 overs)

Koshi Province won by 9 wickets
Pokhara International Cricket Stadium, Pokhara
Umpires: D Agrahari and Vinay Kumar Jha
Player of the match: Sarwan Yadav (Koshi Province)

- Koshi Province won the toss and elected to field.

== Knockout stage ==
=== Bracket ===
Semi-finals
A1	Bagmati Province	127/7 (20)
D1	Tribhuwan Army Club	128/6 (15)
B1	APF Club	186/9 (20)
C1	Madhesh Province	197/6 (20)

Final
SFW1	Tribhuwan Army Club	124/7 (20)
SFW2	Madhesh Province	135/8 (20)

=== Semi-finals ===
30 November 2023
09:00
Scorecard

Bagmati Province; 127/7 (20 overs)	v	Tribhuwan Army Club; 128/6 (15 overs)
Pratik Shrestha 50* (35); Shahab Alam 4/14 (4 overs)		Bhim Sharki 39 (35); Sandeep Lamichhane 2/34 (4 overs)

Tribhuwan Army Club won by 4 wickets
Pokhara International Cricket Stadium, Pokhara
Umpires: Bhoj Raj Baral and Vinay Kumar Jha
Player of the match: Shahab Alam (Tribhuwan Army Club)

- Bagmati Province won the toss and elected bat.

30 November 2023
13:00
Scorecard

Madhesh Province; 197/6 (20 overs)	v	APF Club; 186/9 (20 overs)
Anil Sah 57 (36); Mousom Dhakal 3/47 (4 overs)		Pradeep Airee 55 (42); Bishal Patel 3/35 (4 overs)

Madhesh Province won by 11 runs
Pokhara International Cricket Stadium, Pokhara
Umpires: Rabindra Gupta and Sanjay Sigdel
Player of the match: Anil Sah (Madhesh Province)

- Madhesh Province won the toss and elected to bat.

=== Final ===
1 December 2023
12:30
Scorecard

Madhesh Province; 135/8 (20 overs)	v	Tribhuwan Army Club; 124/7 (20 overs)
Bishal Patel 49* (32); Shahab Alam 3/5 (3 overs)		Binod Bhandari 32 (30); Harishankar Shah 4/19 (4 overs)

Madhesh Province won by 11 runs
Pokhara International Cricket Stadium, Pokhara
Umpires: Vinay Kumar Jha and Sanjay Sigdel
Player of the match: Harishankar Shah (Madhesh Province)

- Madhesh Province won the toss and elected to bat.
