= 2018 Women's World Twenty20 squads =

List of cricketers

The following squads were selected for the 2018 ICC Women's World Twenty20 tournament. On 10 October 2018 the International Cricket Council (ICC) confirmed all the squads for the tournament.

== Australia ==
On 9 October 2018, Cricket Australia announced its squad:

- Meg Lanning (c)
- Nicole Bolton
- Nicola Carey
- Ashleigh Gardner
- Rachael Haynes
- Alyssa Healy
- Jess Jonassen
- Delissa Kimmince
- Sophie Molineux
- Beth Mooney
- Ellyse Perry
- Megan Schutt
- Elyse Villani
- Tayla Vlaeminck
- Georgia Wareham

== Bangladesh ==
On 9 October 2018, the Bangladesh Cricket Board announced its squad:

- Salma Khatun (c)
- Rumana Ahmed
- Sharmin Akhter
- Nahida Akter
- Jahanara Alam
- Panna Ghosh
- Fargana Haque
- Sanjida Islam
- Fahima Khatun
- Khadija Tul Kubra
- Lata Mondol
- Ritu Moni
- Ayesha Rahman
- Nigar Sultana
- Shamima Sultana

== England ==
On 4 October 2018, the England and Wales Cricket Board (ECB) announced its squad: Ahead of the tournament, Katherine Brunt was ruled out due to a back injury and was replaced by Fran Wilson.

- Heather Knight (c)
- Tammy Beaumont
- ~~Katherine Brunt~~
- Sophia Dunkley
- Sophie Ecclestone
- Natasha Farrant
- Kirstie Gordon
- Jenny Gunn
- Danielle Hazell
- Amy Jones (wk)
- Nat Sciver
- Linsey Smith
- Anya Shrubsole
- Fran Wilson
- Lauren Winfield
- Danni Wyatt

== India ==
On 28 September 2018, the Board of Control for Cricket in India (BCCI) announced its squad: During the tournament, Pooja Vastrakar was injured and replaced by Devika Vaidya.

- Harmanpreet Kaur (c)
- Smriti Mandhana (vc)
- Taniya Bhatia (wk)
- Ekta Bisht
- Dayalan Hemalatha
- Mansi Joshi
- Veda Krishnamurthy
- Anuja Patil
- Mithali Raj
- Arundhati Reddy
- Jemimah Rodrigues
- Deepti Sharma
- Devika Vaidya
- ~~Pooja Vastrakar~~
- Poonam Yadav
- Radha Yadav

== Ireland ==
On 3 October 2018, Cricket Ireland announced its squad:

- Laura Delany (c)
- Kim Garth
- Cecelia Joyce
- Isobel Joyce
- Shauna Kavanagh
- Amy Kenealy
- Gaby Lewis
- Lara Maritz
- Ciara Metcalfe
- Lucy O'Reilly
- Celeste Raack
- Eimear Richardson
- Clare Shillington
- Rebecca Stokell
- Mary Waldron

== New Zealand ==
On 18 September 2018, New Zealand Cricket announced its squad:

- Amy Satterthwaite (c)
- Suzie Bates
- Bernadine Bezuidenhout
- Sophie Devine
- Kate Ebrahim
- Maddy Green
- Holly Huddleston
- Hayley Jensen
- Leigh Kasperek
- Amelia Kerr
- Katey Martin
- Anna Peterson
- Hannah Rowe
- Lea Tahuhu
- Jess Watkin

== Pakistan ==
On 10 October 2018, the ICC confirmed Pakistan's squad: No captain was initially named, as their regular captain, Bismah Maroof, was recovering from surgery. Later the same month, Javeria Khan was named as the captain of the squad. Bismah Maroof returned to the squad, replacing Sidra Ameen.

- Javeria Khan (c)
- Muneeba Ali
- ~~Sidra Ameen~~
- Anam Amin
- Aiman Anwer
- Diana Baig
- Nida Dar
- Nahida Khan
- Bismah Maroof
- Sana Mir
- Sidra Nawaz
- Natalia Pervaiz
- Aliya Riaz
- Nashra Sandhu
- Omaima Sohail
- Ayesha Zafar

== South Africa ==
On 9 October 2018, Cricket South Africa announced its squad:

- Dane van Niekerk (c)
- ~~Trisha Chetty~~
- Moseline Daniels
- Yolani Fourie
- Shabnim Ismail
- Marizanne Kapp
- Masabata Klaas
- Lizelle Lee
- Suné Luus
- Zintle Mali
- ~~Raisibe Ntozakhe~~
- Mignon du Preez
- Robyn Searle
- Tumi Sekhukhune
- ~~Saarah Smith~~
- Chloe Tryon
- Faye Tunnicliffe
- Laura Wolvaardt

On the same day that Cricket South Africa named their squad for the tournament, the International Cricket Council (ICC) deemed the bowling action of Raisibe Ntozakhe to be illegal. Therefore, she was immediately suspended from bowling in international matches. Ntozakhe was replaced by Yolani Fourie, while Saarah Smith suffered an injury before the tournament and was replaced by Moseline Daniels. After the start of the tournament, Trisha Chetty was ruled out of South Africa's squad due to an injury and was replaced by Faye Tunnicliffe.

== Sri Lanka ==
On 19 October 2018, Sri Lanka Cricket confirmed its squad:

- Chamari Athapaththu (c)
- Kavisha Dilhari
- Ama Kanchana
- Eshani Kaushalya
- Sugandika Kumari
- Dilani Manodara
- Yashoda Mendis
- Hasini Perera
- Udeshika Prabodhani
- Inoshi Priyadharshani
- Oshadi Ranasinghe
- Nilakshi de Silva
- Shashikala Siriwardene
- Rebeca Vandort
- Sripali Weerakkody

== West Indies ==
On 10 October 2018, Cricket West Indies announced its squad: Before the start of the tournament, Hayley Matthews was appointed as the vice-captain of the team. Qiana Joseph replaced Sheneta Grimmond, who was injured.

- Stafanie Taylor (c)
- Hayley Matthews (vc)
- Merissa Aguilleira
- Shemaine Campbelle
- Shamilia Connell
- Britney Cooper
- Deandra Dottin
- Afy Fletcher
- ~~Sheneta Grimmond~~
- Chinelle Henry
- Qiana Joseph
- Kycia Knight
- Natasha McLean
- Anisa Mohammed
- Chedean Nation
- Shakera Selman
