= Sri Lanka women's cricket team in South Africa in 2018–19 =

International cricket tour

| | South Africa women | Sri Lanka |
- Dates: 1 – 17 February 2019
| Captains | Dane van Niekerk (Note: Suné Luus was named as captain of South Africa Women for the 2nd and 3rd WODIs.) | Chamari Athapaththu |

One Day International series
- Results: South Africa women won the 3-match series 3–0
| Most runs | Andrie Steyn (115) | Chamari Athapaththu (109) |
| Most wickets | Suné Luus (5) | Inoka Ranaweera (5) |

Twenty20 International series
- Results: South Africa women won the 3-match series 3–0
| Most runs | Dane van Niekerk (142) | Shashikala Siriwardene (73) |
| Most wickets | Suné Luus (6) | Inoka Ranaweera (4) |
- Player of the series: Dane van Niekerk (SA)

The Sri Lanka women's cricket team played the South Africa women's cricket team in February 2019. The tour consisted of three Women's One Day Internationals (WODIs), which formed part of the 2017–20 ICC Women's Championship, and three Women's Twenty20 International (WT20I) matches. South Africa Women won the WT20I series 3–0. Their captain Dane van Niekerk was ruled out of the last two WODI matches due to an injury, with Suné Luus leading the team in her place. South Africa Women also won the WODI series 3–0.

== Squads ==
| WODIs | | WT20Is | |
| South Africa | Sri Lanka | South Africa | Sri Lanka |
|---|---|---|---|
| Dane van Niekerk (c); Chloe Tryon (vc); Lara Goodall; Shabnim Ismail; Marizanne Kapp; Masabata Klaas; Nadine de Klerk; ~~Lizelle Lee~~; Suné Luus; Zintle Mali; Mignon du Preez; Tumi Sekhukhune; Saarah Smith; Andrie Steyn; Faye Tunnicliffe (wk); Laura Wolvaardt | Chamari Athapaththu (c); Kavisha Dilhari; Achini Kulasuriya; Imalka Mendis; Hasini Perera; Udeshika Prabodhani; Oshadi Ranasinghe; Inoka Ranaweera; Harshitha Samarawickrama; Anushka Sanjeewani; Tharika Sewwandi; Nilakshi de Silva; Shashikala Siriwardene; Umesha Thimashini; Prasadani Weerakkody | Dane van Niekerk (c); ~~Chloe Tryon (vc)~~; Tazmin Brits; Lara Goodall; Shabnim Ismail; Marizanne Kapp; Masabata Klaas; Nadine de Klerk; ~~Lizelle Lee~~; Suné Luus; ~~Zintle Mali~~; Mignon du Preez; Tumi Sekhukhune; Saarah Smith; Andrie Steyn; Faye Tunnicliffe (wk) | Chamari Athapaththu (c); Kavisha Dilhari; Achini Kulasuriya; Imalka Mendis; Hasini Perera; Udeshika Prabodhani; Oshadi Ranasinghe; Inoka Ranaweera; Harshitha Samarawickrama; Anushka Sanjeewani; Tharika Sewwandi; Nilakshi de Silva; Shashikala Siriwardene; Umesha Thimashini; Prasadani Weerakkody |

Ahead of the WT20I matches, Chloe Tryon was ruled out of South Africa's squad due to an injury, and was replaced by Suné Luus. Lizelle Lee was withdrawn from the tour, due to fitness standards, and was replaced by Andrie Steyn in South Africa's team. Zintle Mali was also ruled out of South Africa's T20I squad due to injury. Suné Luus and Nadine de Klerk were added to South Africa's WODI squad, replacing Lizelle Lee and Chloe Tryon.

== WT20I series ==
=== 1st WT20I ===
1 February 2019
13:00
Scorecard

| Sri Lanka; 90/8 (20 overs) | v | South Africa; 94/3 (14.2 overs) |
| Hasini Perera 27 (41); Dane van Niekerk 3/12 (4 overs) | | Dane van Niekerk 71* (55); Nilakshi de Silva 1/14 (2 overs) |

South Africa Women won by 7 wickets
Newlands Cricket Ground, Cape Town
Umpires: Lauren Agenbag (SA) and Brad White (SA)
Player of the match: Dane van Niekerk (SA)

- Sri Lanka Women won the toss and elected to bat.
- Umesha Thimashini (SL) made her WT20I debut.

=== 2nd WT20I ===
3 February 2019
09:45
Scorecard

| Sri Lanka; 105 (19.4 overs) | v | South Africa; 107/8 (19.5 overs) |
| Shashikala Siriwardene 38 (33); Suné Luus 5/14 (3.4 overs) | | Dane van Niekerk 33 (19); Shashikala Siriwardene 2/12 (4 overs) |

South Africa Women won by 2 wickets
Wanderers Stadium, Johannesburg
Umpires: Siphelele Gasa (SA) and Stephen Harris (SA)
Player of the match: Suné Luus (SA)

- South Africa Women won the toss and elected to field.
- Suné Luus (SA) took her second five-wicket haul in WT20Is.

=== 3rd WT20I ===
6 February 2019
13:00
Scorecard

| South Africa; 163/5 (20 overs) | v | Sri Lanka; 124/8 (20 overs) |
| Dane van Niekerk 38 (29); Inoka Ranaweera 1/24 (2 overs) | | Chamari Athapaththu 43 (36); Nadine de Klerk 3/27 (4 overs) |

South Africa Women won by 39 runs
Centurion Park, Centurion
Umpires: Stephen Harris (SA) and Brad White (SA)
Player of the match: Suné Luus (SA)

- Sri Lanka Women won the toss and elected to field.

== Tour match ==
=== 50 over match: North West Women vs Sri Lanka Women ===
9 February 2019
10:00
Scorecard

| Sri Lanka; 255/8 (50 overs) | v | North West Women; 93 (28.3 overs) |
| Prasadani Weerakkody 64 (70); Esmarelda Olivier 2/56 (10 overs) | | Sinalo Jafta 20 (56); Inoka Ranaweera 4/38 (10 overs) |

Sri Lanka Women won by 162 runs
North-West University No1 Ground, Potchefstroom
Umpires: Kobus Conradie (SA) and Roderick Ellis (SA)

- Sri Lanka Women won the toss and elected to bat.

== WODI series ==
=== 1st WODI ===
ICC Women's Championship
11 February 2019
10:00
Scorecard

| South Africa; 225/7 (48 overs) | v | Sri Lanka; 218/9 (48 overs) |
| Dane van Niekerk 102 (117); Oshadi Ranasinghe 3/40 (9 overs) | | Shashikala Siriwardene 49 (56); Masabata Klaas 3/46 (7 overs) |

South Africa Women won by 7 runs
Senwes Park, Potchefstroom
Umpires: Stephen Harris (SA) and Brad White (SA)
Player of the match: Dane van Niekerk (SA)

- Sri Lanka Women won the toss and elected to field.
- The match was reduced to 48 overs per side due to rain.
- Faye Tunnicliffe (SA) and Umesha Thimashini (SL) both made their WODI debuts.
- Dane van Niekerk scored her first century and became the fourth cricketer for South Africa Women to score 2,000 runs in WODIs.
- Dane van Niekerk also became the fourth woman to achieve the double of reaching 2,000 runs and taking 100 wickets in WODIs.
- Points: South Africa Women 2, Sri Lanka Women 0.

=== 2nd WODI ===
ICC Women's Championship
14 February 2019
10:00
Scorecard

| South Africa; 268/7 (50 overs) | v | Sri Lanka; 231 (46.2 overs) |
| Marizanne Kapp 69* (34); Kavisha Dilhari 2/34 (10 overs) | | Chamari Athapaththu 94 (78); Marizanne Kapp 2/41 (9 overs) |

South Africa Women won by 30 runs (DLS method)
Senwes Park, Potchefstroom
Umpires: Lubabalo Gcuma (SA) and Brad White (SA)
Player of the match: Marizanne Kapp (SA)

- Sri Lanka Women won the toss and elected to field.
- Sri Lanka Women were set a revised target of 262 runs from 47 overs due to rain.
- Points: South Africa Women 2, Sri Lanka Women 0.

=== 3rd WODI ===
ICC Women's Championship
17 February 2019
10:00
Scorecard

| Sri Lanka; 139 (44.2 overs) | v | South Africa; 141/4 (38.2 overs) |
| Anushka Sanjeewani 28 (65); Suné Luus 4/30 (8 overs) | | Mignon du Preez 61* (87); Inoka Ranaweera 3/23 (10 overs) |

South Africa Women won by 6 wickets
Senwes Park, Potchefstroom
Umpires: Lubabalo Gcuma (SA) and Stephen Harris (SA)
Player of the match: Mignon du Preez (SA)

- Sri Lanka won the toss and elected to bat.
- Tharika Sewwandi (SL) made her WODI debut.
- Mignon du Preez (SA) scored her 3,000th run in WODIs.
- Points: South Africa Women 2, Sri Lanka Women 0.
