= Saraswati Kumari =

Nepalese cricketer (born 1997)

Personal information
- Full name: Saraswati Chaudhary Kumari
- Born: 28 January 1997 (age 29); Nepal
- Batting: Right handed
- Bowling: Right-arm medium

International information
- National side: Nepal
- T20I debut (cap 17): 2 December 2019 v Maldives
- Last T20I: 30 May 2023 v Malaysia

Career statistics
| Competition | WT20I |
|---|---|
| Matches | 10 |
| Runs scored | 0 |
| Batting average | – |
| 100s/50s | 0/0 |
| Top score | 0* |
| Balls bowled | 126 |
| Wickets | 6 |
| Bowling average | 14.83 |
| 5 wickets in innings | 0 |
| 10 wickets in match | 0 |
| Best bowling | 4/8 |
| Catches/stumpings | 2/– |
Medal record
Representing Nepal
Women's Cricket
South Asian Games
| Bronze medal – third place | 2019 Kathmandu/Pokhara | Team |
- Source: Cricinfo, 8 October 2024

Saraswati Chaudhary Kumari (Nepali: सरस्वती चौधरी कुमारी, born 28 January 1997) is a Nepali cricketer who plays for the Nepali national women's team.

== Career ==
In November 2019, she was named in Nepal's squad for the women's tournament at the 2019 South Asian Games. She made her Women's Twenty20 International (WT20I) debut for Nepal, against the Maldives, on 2 December 2019 in the opening match of the tournament.

In October 2021, she was named in Nepal's side for the 2021 ICC Women's T20 World Cup Asia Qualifier tournament in the United Arab Emirates.
