= KP Oli Cup =

KP Oli Cup may refer to:

- KP Oli Cup (football)
- KP Oli Cup (cricket)
