= Pokhara International Cricket Stadium =

Cricket Ground in Nepal

Pokhara Cricket Ground
- पाेखरा अन्तर्राष्ट्रिय क्रिकेट रंगशाला
- Interactive map of Pokhara Cricket Ground

Ground information
- Location: Pokhara, Gandaki, Nepal
- Coordinates: 28°12′10.0″N 83°59′24.0″E
- Establishment: 2004; 22 years ago
- Capacity: 5,000+
- Owner: Government of Nepal
- Operator: Gandaki Province Cricket Association
- Tenants: Nepal national women's cricket team; Nepal women's national under-19 cricket team; Gandaki Province cricket team; Pokhara Avengers
- End names
- Pavilion End; Seti Gandaki End

International information
- First WT20I: 2 December 2019: Nepal v Maldives
- Last WT20I: 7 December 2019: Nepal v Maldives
- As of 10 August 2024; Source: Espncricinfo

The Pokhara International Cricket Stadium, simply known as Pokhara Cricket Ground (Nepali: पाेखरा अन्तर्राष्ट्रिय क्रिकेट रंगशाला), is a cricket ground in Pokhara, Gandaki, Nepal.

The stadium is the headquarter of the Gandaki Province Cricket Association, the governing body of cricket in the province. It also served as the home ground for the Gandaki Province cricket team for PM Cup matches.

== History ==
It is the third venue in Nepal, beside Tribhuvan University International Cricket Ground and Mulpani Cricket Ground, to host international cricket matches. It is often regarded as one of the most picturesque cricketing venue in the world.

== Construction ==
To upgrade the stadium, Gandaki provincial government allocated Rs. 30 million in stake. The renovation has been done through several phases.

== Records & statistics ==
=== Matches hosted ===
Format	ODI	T20I	WT20I	WODI
Matches	0	0	8	0
As of 20 November 2024

=== WT20I records ===
- Highest T20I total: 255/2 – Bangladesh vs. Maldives, Cricket at the 2019 South Asian Games – Women's tournament, 5 December 2019
- Highest individual T20I score: Nigar Sultana (113), Bangladesh vs. Maldives, Cricket at the 2019 South Asian Games – Women's tournament, 5 December 2019
- Best T20I Bowling Figure: Anjali Chand (6/0), Nepal vs. Maldives, Cricket at the 2019 South Asian Games – Women's tournament, 2 December 2019
- Highest T20I partnership: 236* (for the 3rd wicket) – Nigar Sultana & Fargana Hoque, Bangladesh vs. Maldives, Cricket at the 2019 South Asian Games – Women's tournament, 5 December 2019
- Most wickets in WT20I: Anjali Chand, Nepal - 10 Wickets

=== Result summary ===
WT20I Matches Record
Team	MP	W	L	T	NR
Nepal	3	2	1	0	0
Maldives	3	0	3	0	0
Bangladesh	2	2	0	0	0
Reference: ESPNcricinfo (As of 2 December 2024)

== International records ==
=== Women's Twenty20 International centuries ===
Two WT20I centuries have been scored at the venue.

No.	Score	Player	Team	Balls	Opposing team	Innings	Date	Result
1	113*	Nigar Sultana	Bangladesh	65	Maldives	1	5 December 2019	Won
2	110*	Fargana Hoque	Bangladesh	53	Maldives	1	5 December 2019	Won

=== Women's Twenty20 International five-wicket hauls ===
One WT20I five-wicket haul has been taken at this venue.

#	Figures	Player	Country	Innings	Opponent	Date	Result
1	6/0	Anjali Chand	Nepal	1	Maldives	2 December 2019	Won

== Major events hosted ==
- Cricket at the 2019 South Asian Games – Women's tournament

== See also ==
- Cricket in Nepal
- Cricket Association of Nepal
- Nepal national cricket team
- List of cricket grounds by capacity
- List of women's Twenty20 International cricket grounds
