= Puja Chakraborty =

Bangladeshi cricketer (born 1997)

Personal information
- Full name: Puja Chakraborty
- Born: 9 October 1997 (age 29)
- Batting: Right-handed
- Bowling: Right-arm off break
- Role: Bowler

International information
- National side: Bangladesh (2019)
- Only T20I (cap 31): 5 December 2019 v Maldives

Domestic team information
- Years: Team
- 2017: Barisal Division

Career statistics
Competition	WT20I
Matches	1
Runs scored	–
Batting average	–
100s/50s	–
Top score	–
Balls bowled	12
Wickets	1
Bowling average	1.00
5 wickets in innings	0
10 wickets in match	0
Best bowling	1/1
Catches/stumpings	0/–
Medal record
Representing Bangladesh
Women's Cricket
South Asian Games
Gold medal – first place	2019 Kathmandu/Pokhara	Team
- Source: Cricinfo, 16 April 2022

Puja Chakraborty (born 9 October 1997) is a Bangladeshi cricketer who plays as a right-arm off break bowler.

== Domestic career ==
She was selected to play for the Red Team in the 2020–21 Bangabandhu 9th Bangladesh Games.

== International career ==
In November 2019, she earned her maiden call-up to the Bangladesh women's cricket team for the cricket tournament at the 2019 South Asian Games. She made her Women's Twenty20 International (WT20I) debut for Bangladesh, against Maldives, on 5 December 2019. She took one wicket for one run in that match.

In January 2020, she was named as a standby player in the Bangladesh squad for the 2020 ICC Women's T20 World Cup. In June 2024, she was named as a standby player in Bangladesh's squad for the 2024 Women's Twenty20 Asia Cup.
