= Cricket at the South Asian Games =

- Current season, competition or edition: Cricket at the 2019 South Asian Games
- Sport: Cricket
- Founded: M: 2010; W: 2019
- First season: 2010
- Administrator: SAOC
- No. of teams: M: 5 W: 4
- Most recent champions: M: Bangladesh (2nd title); W: Bangladesh (1st title)
- Most titles: M: Bangladesh (2 titles); W: Bangladesh (1 title)

Cricket became a medal sport at the 2010 South Asian Games. Since then it has been contested at the Games on two occasions: the 2010 South Asian Games and the 2019 South Asian Games. India, which is the most successful South Asian cricket country, has never sent a team to participate at SAG.

== Summary ==
=== Men ===
| Year | Host | Final | | | Third place match | | |
| Year | Host | Winner | Score | Runner-up | 3rd place | Score | 4th place |
| 2010 | (Bangladesh); Dhaka | Bangladesh | 6 runs | Sri Lanka | Pakistan | 2 wickets | Nepal |
| 2019 | (Nepal); Kirtipur and Pokhara | Bangladesh | 7 wickets | Sri Lanka | Nepal | 5 wickets | Maldives |
| 2026 | (Pakistan); Lahore | | | | | | |

=== Women ===
| Year | Host | Final | | | Third place match | | |
| Year | Host | Winner | Score | Runner-up | 3rd place | Score | 4th place |
| 2019 | (Nepal); Kirtipur and Pokhara | Bangladesh | 2 runs | Sri Lanka | Nepal | 10 wickets | Maldives |
| 2026 | (Pakistan); Lahore | | | | | | |

== Medal table ==
| Rank | Nation | Gold | Silver | Bronze | Total |
|---|---|---|---|---|---|
| 1 | Bangladesh (BAN) | 3 | 0 | 0 | 3 |
| 2 | Sri Lanka (SRI) | 0 | 3 | 0 | 3 |
| 3 | Nepal (NEP) | 0 | 0 | 2 | 2 |
| 4 | Pakistan (PAK) | 0 | 0 | 1 | 1 |
| Totals (4 entries) | | 3 | 3 | 3 | 9 |

== Participating nations ==
Legend

- GS — Group Stage

=== Men ===
| Team | (Bangladesh) 2010 | (Nepal) 2019 | Years |
|---|---|---|---|
| Bangladesh | 1st | 1st | 2 |
| Bhutan | — | 5th | 1 |
| Maldives | 5th | 4th | 2 |
| Nepal | 4th | 3rd | 2 |
| Pakistan | 3rd | — | 1 |
| Sri Lanka | 2nd | 2nd | 2 |
| Total | 5 | 5 | |

=== Women ===
| Team | (Nepal) 2019 | Years |
|---|---|---|
| Bangladesh | 1st | 1 |
| Maldives | 4th | 1 |
| Nepal | 3rd | 1 |
| Sri Lanka | 2nd | 1 |
| Total | 4 | |
