= Tharika Sewwandi =

Sri Lankan cricketer (born 2000)

Personal information
- Born: 18 July 2000 (age 26)
- Batting: Left-handed
- Bowling: Left-arm medium-fast

International information
- National side: Sri Lanka
- Only ODI (cap 72): 17 February 2019 v South Africa
- T20I debut (cap 51): 20 January 2022 v Kenya
- Last T20I: 22 January 2022 v Malaysia
Medal record
Representing Sri Lanka
Women's Cricket
South Asian Games
Silver medal – second place	2019 Kathmandu/Pokhara	Team
- Source: Cricinfo, 22 January 2022

Tharika Sewwandi (born 18 July 2000) is a Sri Lankan cricketer. In January 2019, she was named in Sri Lanka's squad for their series against South Africa. She made her Women's One Day International cricket (WODI) debut against South Africa Women on 17 February 2019.

She was part of Sri Lanka's squad for the women's cricket tournament at the 2019 South Asian Games that won the silver medal, after losing to Bangladesh by two runs in the final.

In October 2021, she was named in Sri Lanka's team for the 2021 Women's Cricket World Cup Qualifier tournament in Zimbabwe. In January 2022, she was named in Sri Lanka's team for the 2022 Commonwealth Games Cricket Qualifier tournament in Malaysia. She made her Women's Twenty20 International cricket (WT20I) debut for Sri Lanka against Kenya Women on 20 January 2022.
