= Umesha Thimashini =

Sri Lankan cricketer (born 2001)

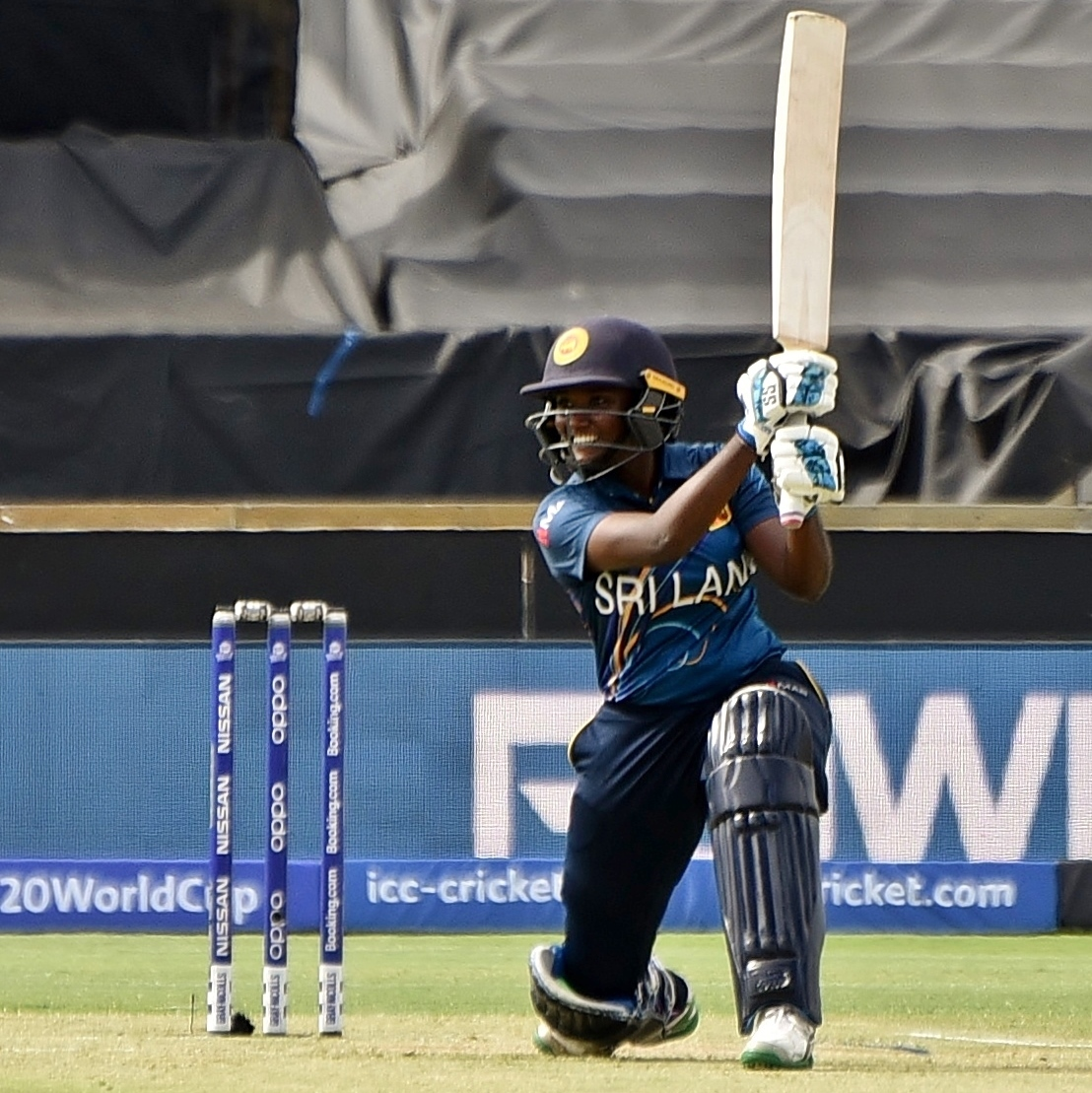
- Thimashini batting for Sri Lanka during the 2020 ICC Women's T20 World Cup

Personal information
- Full name: Umesha Nimeshani Thimashini
- Born: 24 April 2001 (age 25); Rathgama, Galle, Sri Lanka
- Batting: Right-handed
- Bowling: Right-arm offbreak

International information
- National side: Sri Lanka
- Only ODI (cap 71): 11 February 2019 v South Africa
- T20I debut (cap 46): 1 February 2019 v South Africa
- Last T20I: 2 March 2020 v Bangladesh
Medal record
Representing Sri Lanka
Women's Cricket
South Asian Games
Silver medal – second place	2019 Kathmandu/Pokhara	Team
- Source: Cricinfo, 20 September 2020

Umesha Thimashini (born 24 April 2001) is a Sri Lankan cricketer. In January 2019, she was named in Sri Lanka's squad for their series against South Africa. She made her Women's Twenty20 International cricket (WT20I) debut for Sri Lankan against South Africa Women on 1 February 2019. She made her Women's One Day International cricket (WT20I) debut, also against South Africa Women, on 11 February 2019.

In November 2019, she was named in Sri Lanka's squad for the women's cricket tournament at the 2019 South Asian Games, where the Sri Lankan team won the silver medal, losing to Bangladesh by two runs in the final.

In January 2020, she was named in Sri Lanka's squad for the 2020 ICC Women's T20 World Cup in Australia and was one of the five reserve players named in Sri Lanka's team for the 2021 Women's Cricket World Cup Qualifier tournament in Zimbabwe.
