= Cricket at the 2019 South Asian Games =

Cricket tournament

- Dates: 2 December – 9 December 2019
- Cricket format: Twenty20, Twenty20 International
- Host(s): Nepal
- Champions: Bangladesh (2nd title) (men's); Bangladesh (1st title) (women's)
- Participants: 5 men's, 4 women's
- Matches: 20 (12 men's, 8 women's)
- Player of the series: (Sri Lanka) Kamindu Mendis (men's) (Nepal) Anjali Chand (women's)

Cricket at the 2019 South Asian Games was held in Twenty20 format in Kirtipur and Pokhara, Nepal between 2 and 9 December 2019. Cricket returned to the South Asian Games after a period of nine years. The men's tournament featured under-23 squads from Bangladesh and Sri Lanka and senior squads from Bhutan, Maldives and Nepal. The women's event featured teams from Bangladesh, Sri Lanka, Maldives and Nepal. All matches in the men's event were played at the Tribhuvan University International Cricket Ground in Kirtipur. The women's event was played at the Pokhara Stadium.

== Medal summary ==
=== Medal table ===
* Host nation (Nepal)

Rank	Nation	Gold	Silver	Bronze	Total
1	Bangladesh (BAN)	2	0	0	2
2	Sri Lanka (SRI)	0	2	0	2
3	Nepal (NEP)	0	0	2	2
Totals (3 entries)		2	2	2	6

=== Results ===
Event	Gold	Silver	Bronze
Men	Bangladesh	Sri Lanka	Nepal
Women	Bangladesh	Sri Lanka	Nepal

== Participating teams ==
Men:

- Bangladesh U23
- Bhutan
- Maldives
- Nepal
- Sri Lanka U23

Women:

- Bangladesh
- Maldives
- Nepal
- Sri Lanka U23
