= National T20 Championship =

Cricket tournament

- Countries: Nepal
- Administrator: Cricket Association of Nepal
- Format: Twenty20 cricket
- First edition: 2023
- Latest edition: 2024
- Next edition: 2025
- Tournament format: Round-robin
- Number of teams: 7
- Current champion: Lumbini Province
- Most successful: Madhesh Province; Lumbini Province (1 title each)

The National T20 Championship is a Twenty20 cricket tournament in Nepal organised by the Cricket Association of Nepal. It currently features the seven provincial teams.

== History ==
It was collectively organised by both the Cricket Association of Nepal and Madan Bhandari Sports Academy The first season competes 12 teams, seven provincial teams, three departemental teams and two organizer teams.

== Teams ==
=== Current teams ===
Team	Province	Home ground	Debut	Captain
Koshi Province cricket team	Koshi	Girija Prasad Koirala Cricket Stadium	2023	Ankit Subedi
Madhesh Province cricket team	Madhesh	Shree Ram Janaki International Stadium	2023	Harishankar Shah
Bagmati Province cricket team	Bagmati	Mulpani Cricket Stadium	2023	Rit Gautam
Gandaki Province cricket team	Gandaki	Pokhara International Cricket Stadium	2023	Bipin Khatri
Lumbini Province cricket team	Lumbini	Siddhartha Cricket Stadium	2023	Dev Khanal
Karnali Province cricket team	Karnali	Kalinchowk Cricket Ground	2023	Diwan Pun
Sudurpashchim Province cricket team	Sudurpashchim	Fapla International Cricket Ground	2023	Hemant Dhami

=== Defunct teams ===
Team	Debut	Dissolved
APF Club	2023	
Nepal Police Club	2023	
Tribhuwan Army Club	2023	
Madan Bhandari Sports Academy (Red)	2023	2023
Madan Bhandari Sports Academy (Blue)	2023	2023

== Winners ==
Season	Final			Final venue	Player of the season
Season	Winner	Result	Runner-up	Final venue	Player of the season
2023	Madhesh Province; 135/8 (20 overs)	Madhesh Province won by 11 runs (Scorecard)	Tribhuwan Army; 124/7 (20 overs)	Pokhara International Cricket Stadium, Pokhara	Harishankar Shah (Madhesh Province)
2024	Lumbini Province; 116/9 (20 overs)	Lumbini Province won by 5 wickets (Scorecard)	Karnali Province; 85/10 (15.3 overs)	Mulpani International Cricket Ground, Mulpani	Abhisek Pal (Sudurpashchim Province)
2026	TBD	TBD	TBD	TBD	TBD

== Team's performance ==
=== Seasons ===
Season (No. of teams)	2023 (12)	2024 (7)
Koshi Province	GS	GS
Madhesh Province	C	GS
Bagmati Province	SF	GS
Gandaki Province	GS	GS
Lumbini Province	GS	C
Karnali Province	GS	RU
Sudurpashchim Province	GS	GS
Tribhuwan Army Club^{†}	RU	-
APF Club^{†}	SF	-
Nepal Police Club^{†}	GS	-
Madan Bhandari Sports Academy (Red)^{†}	GS	-
Madan Bhandari Sports Academy (Red)^{†}	GS	-

^{†} Team now defunct

- C: Champions
- RU: Runner-up
- SF: Semi-final
- GS – Group stage

== See also ==
- Prime Minister Cup Men's National Cricket Tournament
- Jay Trophy
- Prime Minister Cup Women's National Tournament
