= 1Sports =

Indian sports television channel

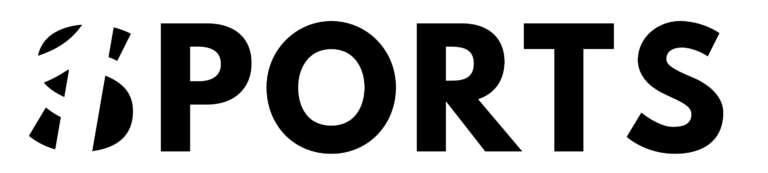
- Country: India
- Headquarters: Gurgaon, India

Programming
- Language: English
- Picture format: 16:9 (576i, SDTV)

Ownership
- Owner: Lex Sportel Vision Pvt. Ltd. (LSVPL)

History
- Launched: 28 January 2020; 6 years ago
- Closed: 21 November 2023; 2 years ago

Links
- Website: 1sport.in

1Sports was an Indian sports television channel owned by Lex Sportel Vision Pvt. Ltd., launched after Discovery India took control of their DSport channel. 1Sports broadcast live sporting action from around the world, including high-profile content such as I-League. The channel ceased broadcasting on 21 November 2023.

== History ==
On 6 February 2017 Discovery Communications (DC) launched the DSport channel to broadcast different kinds of sports in the Indian subcontinent. Since then Venkateish (owner of Lex Sportel) acquired broadcast rights of multiple events which were broadcast on DSport, until November 2019. In January 2020 Discovery applied a name change of their sports channel to Eurosport, which was challenged by Lex Sportel as the one who made the uplinking license deal of the channel. Delhi High Court ruled in favour of Discovery and as a result Lex Sportel went out of the deal. Then Lex Sportel started showing ads about the launch of their new channel and a scroll text on DSport channel that contents of the channel belongs to Lex Sportel's server based in Hong Kong, until 24 January when Discovery took full control of the channel. Though this was scheduled to take effect on 14 February, Discovery took control of the channel three weeks before the original date, but the court dismissed the matter. Finally, on 28 January Lex Sportel launched their own channel, 1Sports. The channel ceased its operations on 21 November 2023.

== Events ==
Lex Sportel has acquired some premium sports events from around the world and provided over 4,000 hours of live content every year. They held broadcasting rights to the Afghanistan Premier League and Everest Premier League. 1Sports aired Coppa Italia, Coupe de France and UAE Pro League, among others. The channel also broadcast Pro-Wrestling (Lucha Underground, Ring of Honor, WOS Wrestling and WIN: Dangal Ke Soorma), MMA (Bellator and Cage Warriors), Golf (The Open, The Masters, European Tour, LPGA and Ryder Cup), Tennis (Laver Cup) and motorsports (Dakar Rally and Monster Jam).

=== Cricket ===
- Afghanistan Premier League
- Everest Premier League
- Zambia T10 league
- British Columbia T20 league
- Asian Challenger Trophy

=== Football ===
- I-League
- Coppa Italia
- Coupe de France
- UAE Pro League

=== Golf ===
- Australian Open
- The Open Championship
- Masters Tournament
- European Tour
- LPGA
- Ryder Cup
- Hero Indian Open
- Hero Women's Indian Open

=== Motorsport ===
- Dakar Rally
- Monster Jam

=== Mixed Martial Arts ===
- Bellator MMA
- Cage Warriors

=== Tennis ===
- Laver Cup
