= Celeste Raack =

Australian-Irish cricketer

Personal information
- Full name: Celeste Raack
- Born: 18 May 1994 (age 32); Sydney, Australia
- Batting: Right-handed
- Bowling: Right-arm leg break
- Role: All-rounder

International information
- National side: Ireland
- ODI debut (cap 91): 5 October 2021 v Zimbabwe
- Last ODI: 23 November 2021 v West Indies
- T20I debut (cap 38): 13 November 2018 v Pakistan
- Last T20I: 8 June 2022 v South Africa

Domestic team information
- Years: Team
- 2014/15–2017/18: Tasmania
- 2015/16–2017/18: Hobart Hurricanes
- 2018–present: Typhoons

Career statistics
Competition	WT20I
Matches	18
Runs scored	32
Batting average	16.00
100s/50s	0/0
Top score	10
Balls bowled	264
Wickets	12
Bowling average	21.33
5 wickets in innings	0
10 wickets in match	0
Best bowling	3/15
Catches/stumpings	1/–
- Source: Cricinfo, 8 June 2022

Celeste Raack (born 18 May 1994) is an Australian-Irish cricketer who plays as an all-rounder for Typhoons and Ireland. She holds an Irish passport and was selected to represent Ireland in October 2018, making her full international debut the following month. She previously played in Australia for Tasmania and Hobart Hurricanes.

== Career ==
=== Australia ===
Originally from Sydney, New South Wales, Raack was the second leading wicket taker in the 2011–12 Sydney First Grade competition. That season, she also toured with the NSW Second XI for a tri-series against the Victorian Second XI, and with her leg spinners bagged a match-winning 4–11 in one of the matches. Additionally, she represented NSW at the U18 National Championship, claiming eight wickets at 8.88 with a best of 4–14.

For the 2012–13 season, Raack was awarded a Basil Sellers scholarship, and for 2013–14, she was selected in the Cricket NSW Academy Development squad.

Raack was then recruited by Tasmania for the 2014–15 season. She quickly achieved prominence by taking 4–41 in a Twenty20 match against the ACT Meteors. During the following off-season, she moved permanently to Tasmania after finding a full-time job.

Raack debuted for Hobart Hurricanes against the Melbourne Stars during its inaugural WBBL|01 season (2015–16). She remained in the Hurricanes squad for the WBBL|02 season (2016–17).

Off the field, Raack completed a Bachelor of Health Science/Master of Physiotherapy at the University of Western Sydney, and has worked in Hobart as a physiotherapist.

=== Ireland ===
In October 2018, she was named in Ireland's squad for the 2018 ICC Women's World Twenty20 tournament. She made her Women's Twenty20 International cricket (WT20I) debut for Ireland against Pakistan Women on 13 November 2018.

In August 2019, she was named in Ireland's squad for the 2019 ICC Women's World Twenty20 Qualifier tournament in Scotland. In July 2020, she was awarded a part-time professional contract by Cricket Ireland for the following year.

In September 2021, Raack was named in Ireland's Women's One Day International (WODI) squad for their series against Zimbabwe, the first WODI matches to be played by the Zimbabwe team. She made her WODI debut on 5 October 2021, for Ireland against Zimbabwe.

In November 2021, she was named in Ireland's team for the 2021 Women's Cricket World Cup Qualifier tournament in Zimbabwe.
