= South Africa women's cricket team in the West Indies in 2018–19 =

International cricket tour

	West Indies women	South Africa women
- Dates: 16 September – 6 October 2018
Captains	Stafanie Taylor	Dane van Niekerk (Note: Chloe Tryon captained South Africa Women for the first, fourth and fifth WT20Is.)

One Day International series
- Results: 3-match series drawn 1–1
Most runs	Hayley Matthews (117)	Dane van Niekerk (176)
Most wickets	Deandra Dottin (9)	Marizanne Kapp (7)
- Player of the series: Dane van Niekerk (SA)

Twenty20 International series
- Results: 5-match series drawn 2–2
- Player of the series: Natasha McLean (WI)

The South Africa women's cricket team played the West Indies women's cricket team in September and October 2018. The tour consisted of three Women's One Day Internationals (WODIs), which formed part of the 2017–20 ICC Women's Championship, and five Women's Twenty20 Internationals (WT20I). The WODI series was drawn 1–1, after the second match was interrupted by rain and finished with no result. The WT20I series was drawn 2–2, after the third match of the series was abandoned due to wet outfield.

== Squads ==
WODIs		WT20Is	
West Indies	South Africa	West Indies	South Africa
Stafanie Taylor (c); Merissa Aguilleira (wk); Shemaine Campbelle; Shamilia Connell; Deandra Dottin; Afy Fletcher; Qiana Joseph; Kycia Knight; Hayley Matthews; Natasha McLean; Anisa Mohammed; Chedean Nation; Shakera Selman	Dane van Niekerk (c); ~~Trisha Chetty~~; ~~Shabnim Ismail~~; Marizanne Kapp; Masabata Klaas; Lizelle Lee (wk); Suné Luus; Zintle Mali; Raisibe Ntozakhe; Mignon du Preez; Robyn Searle; Tumi Sekhukhune; Saarah Smith; Chloe Tryon; Faye Tunnicliffe; Laura Wolvaardt	Stafanie Taylor (c); Merissa Aguilleira (wk); Shemaine Campbelle; Shamilia Connell; Deandra Dottin; Afy Fletcher; Sheneta Grimmond; Qiana Joseph; Kycia Knight; Hayley Matthews; Natasha McLean; Anisa Mohammed; Chedean Nation; Karishma Ramharack; Shakera Selman	Dane van Niekerk (c); ~~Trisha Chetty~~; ~~Shabnim Ismail~~; Marizanne Kapp; Masabata Klaas; Lizelle Lee (wk); Suné Luus; Zintle Mali; Raisibe Ntozakhe; Mignon du Preez; Robyn Searle; Tumi Sekhukhune; Saarah Smith; Chloe Tryon; Faye Tunnicliffe; Laura Wolvaardt

Ahead of the tour, Trisha Chetty and Shabnim Ismail were ruled of South Africa's squads, with Chetty being replaced by Faye Tunnicliffe.

== WODI series ==
=== 1st WODI ===
ICC Women's Championship
16 September 2018
09:30
Scorecard

South Africa; 201/9 (50 overs)	v	West Indies; 161 (46 overs)
Suné Luus 58 (86); Stafanie Taylor 3/37 (10 overs)		Shemaine Campbelle 46 (71); Marizanne Kapp 3/14 (9 overs)

South Africa Women won by 40 runs
Kensington Oval, Bridgetown
Umpires: Jonathan Blades (WI) and Jacqueline Williams (WI)
Player of the match: Suné Luus (SA)

- West Indies Women won the toss and elected to field.
- Tumi Sekhukhune (SA) made her WODI debut.
- Marizanne Kapp (SA) took her 100th wicket in WODIs.
- Points: South Africa Women 2, West Indies Women 0.

=== 2nd WODI ===
ICC Women's Championship
19 September 2018
09:30
Scorecard

South Africa; 177/8 (38 overs)	v	West Indies
Dane van Niekerk 53 (66); Deandra Dottin 3/29 (8 overs)

No result
Kensington Oval, Bridgetown
Umpires: Jonathan Blades (WI) and Leslie Reifer (WI)

- West Indies Women won the toss and elected to field.
- Rain during the innings break prevented any further play.
- Points: West Indies Women 1, South Africa Women 1.

=== 3rd WODI ===
ICC Women's Championship
22 September 2018
14:00 (D/N)
Scorecard

West Indies; 292/5 (50 overs)	v	South Africa; 177 (42.3 overs)
Hayley Matthews 117 (146); Marizanne Kapp 4/55 (10 overs)		Dane van Niekerk 77 (105); Deandra Dottin 4/36 (9.3 overs)

West Indies won by 115 runs
Kensington Oval, Bridgetown
Umpires: Leslie Reifer (WI) and Jacqueline Williams (WI)
Player of the match: Hayley Matthews (WI)

- West Indies Women won the toss and elected to bat.
- Hayley Matthews (WI) scored her first century in ODIs.
- Points: West Indies Women 2, South Africa Women 0.

== WT20I series ==
=== 1st WT20I ===
24 September 2018
13:30
Scorecard

West Indies; 124/6 (20 overs)	v	South Africa; 107/7 (20 overs)
Natasha McLean 38 (41); Saarah Smith 2/18 (4 overs)		Marizanne Kapp 30 (22); Stafanie Taylor 3/16 (4 overs)

West Indies Women won by 17 runs
Kensington Oval, Bridgetown
Umpires: Jonathan Blades (WI) and Jacqueline Williams (WI)
Player of the match: Natasha McLean (WI)

- West Indies Women won the toss and elected to bat.
- Robyn Searle, Tumi Sekhukhune, Saarah Smith and Faye Tunnicliffe (SA) all made their WT20I debuts.

=== 2nd WT20I ===
28 September 2018
19:00 (N)
Scorecard

South Africa; 101/8 (20 overs)	v	West Indies; 102/1 (15.3 overs)
Dane van Niekerk 36 (48); Anisa Mohammed 5/24 (4 overs)		Natasha McLean 42* (46); Suné Luus 1/10 (1 over)

West Indies Women won by 9 wickets
Brian Lara Cricket Academy, Trinidad
Umpires: Zahid Bassarath (WI) and Joel Wilson (WI)
Player of the match: Anisa Mohammed (WI)

- West Indies Women won the toss and elected to field.
- Deandra Dottin (WI) became the third woman to play in 100 WT20Is.
- Anisa Mohammed (WI) took a hat-trick and took the most five-wicket hauls in WT20Is (3).

=== 3rd WT20I ===
30 September 2018
16:00 (D/N)
Scorecard

West Indies	v	South Africa

Match abandoned
Brian Lara Cricket Academy, Trinidad
Umpires: Jacqueline Williams (WI) and Joel Wilson (WI)

- No toss.
- No play was possible due to a wet outfield.

=== 4th WT20I ===
4 October 2018
19:00 (N)
Scorecard

West Indies; 135/3 (20 overs)	v	South Africa; 136/2 (18.4 overs)
Natasha McLean 57* (61); Tumi Sekhukhune 2/27 (4 overs)		Lizelle Lee 54 (38); Afy Fletcher 1/12 (4 overs)

South Africa Women won by 8 wickets
Brian Lara Cricket Academy, Trinidad
Umpires: Zahid Bassarath (WI) and Jacqueline Williams (WI)
Player of the match: Laura Wolvaardt (SA)

- South Africa Women won the toss and elected to field.

=== 5th WT20I ===
6 October 2018
19:00 (N)
Scorecard

West Indies; 155/5 (20 overs)	v	South Africa; 156/7 (19.5 overs)
Hayley Matthews 70 (52); Saarah Smith 2/24 (2 overs)		Lizelle Lee 42 (24); Shamilia Connell 2/20 (3.5 overs)

South Africa Women won by 3 wickets
Brian Lara Cricket Academy, Trinidad
Umpires: Jacqueline Williams (WI) and Joel Wilson (WI)
Player of the match: Lizelle Lee (SA)

- South Africa Women won the toss and elected to field.
