= List of Maldives women Twenty20 International cricketers =

This is a list of Maldives women Twenty20 International cricketers. A Twenty20 International is an international cricket match between two representative teams. A Twenty20 International is played under the rules of Twenty20 cricket. In April 2018, the International Cricket Council (ICC) granted full international status to Twenty20 women's matches played between member sides from 1 July 2018 onwards. The Maldives women's team made their Twenty20 International debut on 2 December 2019 against Nepal in Pokhara Stadium, Pokhara during the 2019 South Asian Games.

The list is arranged in the order in which each player won her first Twenty20 cap. Where more than one player won her first Twenty20 cap in the same match, their names are listed alphabetically by surname.

== Key ==
General

- ‡ – Captain
- † – Wicket-keeper
- First – Year of debut
- Last – Year of latest game
- Mat – Number of matches played

Batting

- Runs – Runs scored in career
- HS – Highest score
- Avg – Runs scored per dismissal
- * – Batsman remained not out
- 50 – Number of half centuries

Bowling

- Wkt – Wickets taken in career
- BBI – Best bowling in an innings
- Ave – Average runs per wicket

Fielding

- Ca – Catches taken
- St – Stumpings affected

== Players ==
Statistics are correct as of 13 February 2024.

General					Batting				Bowling				Fielding		Ref
No.	Name	First	Last	Mat	Runs	HS	Avg	50	Balls	Wkt	BBI	Ave	Ca	St	Ref
1	Aima Aishath	2019	2019	3	1	1	0.50	0	–	–	–	–	0	0	
2	Eashal Ibrahim	2019	2019	3	0	0	0.00	0	30	0	–	–	0	0	
3	Hafsaa Abdhulla†	2019	2024	6	14	8	2.80	0	–	–	–	–	0	0	
4	Hamza Niyaz	2019	2024	4	12	9	3.00	0	–	–	–	–	0	0	
5	Kinaanath Ismail	2019	2019	3	1	1	0.33	0	24	0	–	–	0	0	
6	Latsha Haleemath	2019	2024	6	18	17	3.00	0	84	2	2/23	76.50	2	0	
7	Sajaa Fathimath	2019	2024	5	3	1	0.60	0	–	–	–	–	0	0	
8	Shaffaa Saleem	2019	2019	1	0	0	0.00	0	–	–	–	–	0	0	
9	Shamma Ali	2019	2024	6	2	2	0.50	0	96	4	3/44	35.00	0	0	
10	Sumayya Abdul‡	2019	2024	6	29	15	5.80	0	66	0	–	–	0	0	
11	Zoona Mariyam‡	2019	2019	3	0	0	0.00	0	–	–	–	–	0	0	
12	Maaha Naseer	2019	2024	3	0	0*	0.00	0	18	0	–	–	0	0	
13	Aishath Meesa Rameez	2024	2024	3	3	3	1.00	0	72	2	2/20	58.50	1	0	
14	Fathimath Anaal	2024	2024	2	0	0	0.00	0	6	0	–	–	0	0	
15	Fathimath Malha	2024	2024	3	4	3	1.33	0	12	0	–	–	0	0	
16	Hawwa Shaaiqa	2024	2024	3	1	1	0.33	0	6	0	–	–	0	0	
17	Nabaa Naseem	2024	2024	3	2	2	0.66	0	72	5	3/23	21.60	2	0	
18	Hawwa Ifasha	2024	2024	1	0	0	0.00	0	–	–	–	–	0	0	
19	Leen Luthufee	2024	2024	2	0	0	0.00	0	6	0	–	–	0	0	
