= Mousom Dhakal =

Nepalese cricketer (born 2001)

Personal information
- Full name: Mousom Dhakal
- Born: 27 January 2001 (age 25); Rupandehi, Nepal
- Batting: Right-handed
- Bowling: Right-arm offbreak
- Role: Bowler

International information
- National side: Nepal (2023–present)
- T20I debut (cap 44): 18 October 2023 v United Arab Emirates
- Last T20I: 19 October 2023 v Hong Kong

Domestic team information
- Years: Team
- 2024: Karnali Yaks
- 2024-present: A.P.F Club
- Source: ESPNcricinfo, 18 April 2025

Mousom Dhakal also spelled Mausam Dhakal (born 27 January 2001) is a Nepalese cricketer who plays as a right arm Leg break bowler for the Nepal national cricket team and represents Armed Police Force Club in domestic Cricket. He made his (T20I) debut for Nepal against the United Arab Emirates on 18 October 2023 during the Nepal Tri-Nation Series. Similarly, he represented Nepal A team in the 2023 ACC Emerging Teams Asia Cup against UAE A, marking his List A debut on 19 July 2023 in Colombo. He was also included in Nepal's squad for the 2023 Asia Cup held in Pakistan and SriLanka.

== Franchise ==
In the Nepal Premier League (NPL) 2024 auction, Dhakal was signed by Karnali Yaks for NRs 1,000,000 under Category B.
