= Robyn Searle =

South African cricketer

Personal information
- Full name: Robyn Searle
- Born: 17 June 1997 (age 29); Johannesburg, South Africa
- Batting: Right-handed
- Bowling: Right-arm medium
- Role: Batter; occasional wicket-keeper

International information
- National side: South Africa (2018)
- T20I debut (cap 49): 24 September 2018 v West Indies
- Last T20I: 6 October 2018 v West Indies

Domestic team information
- Years: Team
- 2010/11–2019/20: Central Gauteng
- 2020/21–present: Northerns
- 2022: Typhoons

Career statistics
Competition	WT20I
Matches	2
Runs scored	28
Batting average	14.00
100s/50s	0/0
Top score	14
Catches/stumpings	0/–
- Source: Cricinfo, 16 February 2022

Robyn Searle (born 17 June 1997) is a South African cricketer. In August 2018, she was named in the South Africa Women's squad for their series against the West Indies Women. She made her Women's Twenty20 International cricket (WT20I) debut for South Africa against West Indies Women on 24 September 2018.

In October 2018, she was named in South Africa's squad for the 2018 ICC Women's World Twenty20 tournament in the West Indies. In February 2019, Cricket South Africa named her as one of the players in the Powerade Women's National Academy intake for 2019. In September 2019, she was named in the F van der Merwe XI squad for the inaugural edition of the Women's T20 Super League in South Africa. On 23 July 2020, Searle was named in South Africa's 24-woman squad to begin training in Pretoria, ahead of their tour to England.

In April 2021, she was part of the South African Emerging Women's squad that toured Bangladesh.
