= Anjali Chand =

Nepalese cricketer (born 1995)

Personal information
- Full name: Anjali Chand
- Born: 16 September 1995 (age 31); Nepal
- Batting: Right handed
- Bowling: Left-arm medium
- Role: Bowler

International information
- National side: Nepal
- T20I debut (cap 16): 2 December 2019 v Maldives
- Last T20I: 7 December 2019 v Maldives

Career statistics
Competition	WT20I
Matches	3
Runs scored	0
Batting average	0.00
100s/50s	0/0
Top score	0
Balls bowled	43
Wickets	10
Bowling average	0.40
5 wickets in innings	1
10 wickets in match	0
Best bowling	6/0
Catches/stumpings	1/–
Medal record
Representing Nepal
Women's Cricket
South Asian Games
Bronze medal – third place	2019 Kathmandu/Pokhara	Team
- Source: Cricinfo, 27 August 2021

Anjali Chand (Nepali: अञ्जली चन्द, born 16 September 1995) is a Nepali cricketer who plays for the Nepali national women's team. She has scored a century in a domestic national tournament, becoming the third Nepali woman to score a century. She played in the 2014 Asian Games as a batswoman for Nepal.

In November 2019, she was named in Nepal's squad for the women's tournament at the 2019 South Asian Games. She made her Women's Twenty20 International (WT20I) debut for Nepal, against the Maldives, on 2 December 2019 in the opening match of the tournament. In the match, she took six wickets for no runs from thirteen deliveries, recording the best bowling figures in a WT20I match. The record stood in place until Frederique Overdijk broke it in August 2021. She also took a hat-trick from her last three deliveries.
