= Faye Tunnicliffe =

South African cricketer (born 1998)

Personal information
- Born: 9 December 1998 (age 27)
- Batting: Right-handed
- Role: Wicket-keeper

International information
- National side: South Africa (2018–present)
- ODI debut (cap 84): 11 February 2019 v Sri Lanka
- Last ODI: 17 February 2019 v Sri Lanka
- T20I debut (cap 52): 24 September 2018 v West Indies
- Last T20I: 27 November 2024 v England

Domestic team information
- Years: Team
- 2014/15–2018/19: Boland
- 2019/20–present: Western Province

Career statistics
Competition	WODI	WT20I
Matches	3	11
Runs scored	15	78
Batting average	7.50	11.14
100s/50s	0/0	0/0
Top score	15	18
Catches/stumpings	8/0	1/2
Medal record
Women's cricket
Representing South Africa
African Games
Silver medal – second place	2023 Accra
- Source: ESPNcricinfo, 28 November 2024

Faye Tunnicliffe (born 9 December 1998) is a South African cricketer who plays as a wicket-keeper and right-handed batter.

== Career ==
In August 2018, she was named in the South Africa Women's squad for their series against the West Indies Women. She made her Women's Twenty20 International cricket (WT20I) debut for South Africa against West Indies Women on 24 September 2018.

In November 2018, she was added to South Africa's squad for the 2018 ICC Women's World Twenty20 tournament, replacing Trisha Chetty, who was ruled out of the squad due to an injury. In January 2019, she was named in South Africa's squad for their series against Sri Lanka. She made her Women's One Day International cricket (WT20I) debut for South Africa against Sri Lanka Women on 11 February 2019.

In February 2019, Cricket South Africa named her as one of the players in the Powerade Women's National Academy intake for 2019. In September 2019, she was named in the Devnarain XI squad for the inaugural edition of the Women's T20 Super League in South Africa. On 23 July 2020, Tunnicliffe was named in South Africa's 24-woman squad to begin training in Pretoria, ahead of their tour to England.

In April 2021, she was part of the South African Emerging Women's squad that toured Bangladesh. In August 2021, she was also named in the South African Emerging team for their series against Thailand.

Tunnicliffe was named in the South Africa squad for the T20 part of their multi-format home series against England in November 2024.
