= Asian Challenger Trophy =

Cricket tournament in Nepal

Asian Challenger Trophy (Club)
- Countries: Nepal
- Administrator: Bhairahawa Queens Pvt. Ltd.
- Headquarters: Kathmandu
- Format: Twenty20
- First edition: 2020
- Latest edition: 2020
- Next edition: 2022
- Tournament format: Round-robin and Knockout
- Number of teams: 8 teams
- Current champion: Shankarnagar Cricket Club
- Most successful: Shankarnagar Cricket Club (1st title)
- Most runs: Ali Samad
- Most wickets: Bikram Bhusal
- TV: Action Sports HD (2020) AP1 HD (2022) 1Sports (2022)
- Website: https://www.act-t20.com

Asian Challenger Trophy (ACT) (Nepali: एसियन च्यालेन्जर ट्रफी) is a club Twenty20 cricket tournament organized by Bhairahawa Queens Pvt. Ltd., a private group in Nepal run by Sushil Pandey, Niraj Aryal and Anil Bhandari. It is the biggest club cricket tournament in the country, played during the northern winter calendar, mostly in the month of January - February. It is played in a league-cum-knockout format in which top four teams qualify for the playoffs. Each team consists of 15 players.

This tournament is supported by Cricket Association of Rupendehi and promoted by Cricket Association of Nepal and the National Sports Council of Nepal.

== 2020 ==
The first edition of the tournament was held from 25 February to 5 March 2020 at Siddhartha Rangashala, Bhairahawa with eight professional clubs from Asian countries made up of domestic and international players from across Asia.

Almost 24 international players took part in season one, including Sharad Vesawkar, Basanta Regmi, Rohit Paudel, Rana Naveed, Kamal Airee, Sandeep Sunar, Lokesh Bam, Kushal Bhurtel and Pradeep Airee.

Shankarnagar Cricket Club emerged as the champions.

Asian Challenger Trophy (Season 1)
Teams	Captain	Coach	Countries
Rhino Cricket Club	Rohit Kumar Paudel	Sushil Pandey	Kathmandu, Nepal
Shankarnagar Cricket Club	Sandeep Sunar	Basanta Shahi	Butwal, Nepal
Showbiz Sports	Ankit Pratap Singh		Kathmandu, Nepal
Asrak Sports Global Cricket Club	MBA Chowdhury	Brian Anthony Berthoud	Dhaka, Bangladesh
Alpha Warriors India	Hamza Farooqui		Mumbai, India
Sarah Cricket Club	Boda Prashanth		Hyderabad, India
Gujrat Lions	Majid Ilyas Khan	Rana Naveed	Gujrat, Pakistan
Western Cricket Club	Basanta Regmi	Bishnu Gywali	Butwal, Nepal

== 2022 ==
The Second edition of the tournament will be held from 10 to 22 November 2022 at Kathmandu. This season six professional clubs from Asian Countries will take participate. Tournament will be play as round robin with playoff.
