= Saarah Smith =

South African cricketer (born 1999)

Personal information
- Full name: Saarah Smith
- Born: 30 March 1999 (age 27)
- Batting: Right-handed
- Bowling: Right-arm off break
- Role: All-rounder

International information
- National side: South Africa
- T20I debut (cap 51): 24 September 2018 v West Indies
- Last T20I: 6 February 2019 v Sri Lanka

Domestic team information
- Years: Team
- 2011/12: North West
- 2015/16–present: Western Province

Career statistics
Competition	WT20I
Matches	7
Runs scored	6
Batting average	3.00
100s/50s	0/0
Top score	4
Balls bowled	42
Wickets	4
Bowling average	14.25
5 wickets in innings	0
10 wickets in match	0
Best bowling	2/17
Catches/stumpings	0/–
- Source: Cricinfo, 17 February 2022

Saarah Smith (born 30 March 1999) is a South African cricketer. In August 2018, she was named in the South Africa Women's squad for their series against the West Indies Women. She made her Women's Twenty20 International cricket (WT20I) debut for South Africa against West Indies Women on 24 September 2018.

In October 2018, she was named in South Africa's squad for the 2018 ICC Women's World Twenty20 tournament in the West Indies. However, the following month, she was ruled out of the tournament due to an injury and replaced by Moseline Daniels.

In February 2019, Cricket South Africa named her as one of the players in the Powerade Women's National Academy intake for 2019. In September 2019, she was named in the Terblanche XI squad for the inaugural edition of the Women's T20 Super League in South Africa.
