= Cricket at the 2019 South Asian Games – Women's tournament =

Women's cricket at the 2019 South Asian Games
- Venue: Pokhara Stadium, Pokhara
- Date: 2 December 2019 – 8 December 2019
- Nations: 4

Medalists
gold medal	Bangladesh (1st title)
silver medal	Sri Lanka
bronze medal	Nepal

Women's cricket at the 2019 South Asian Games was held in Pokhara, Nepal from 2 to 8 December 2019. The women's event featured teams from Bangladesh, Sri Lanka, Maldives and Nepal. Sri Lanka named an under-23 squad, while matches played between Bangladesh, Maldives and Nepal were granted Women's Twenty20 International status. Matches were played at the Pokhara Stadium.

On 2 December 2019, the Maldives played their first-ever WT20I match, when they faced Nepal in the opening match of the tournament. In the same match, Anjali Chand of Nepal took six wickets without conceding a run. On 5 December 2019, Bangladesh beat the Maldives by 249 runs, bowling them out for just six runs.

Nepal beat the Maldives by ten wickets in the bronze medal play-off match. In the match, the Maldives were dismissed for just eight runs, to record the second lowest total in a WT20I match. Only one run came from the bat, with the other seven runs coming from wides. Nine cricketers were dismissed without scoring.

In the final, Bangladesh beat Sri Lanka by two runs to win the gold medal. Bangladesh defended seven runs from the final over of the match to win their first ever gold in cricket at the South Asian Games.

== Format ==
The four participating nations played matches on a round-robin basis. The top two teams progressed to the final, while the third and fourth sides met in the bronze medal match.

== Squads ==
Bangladesh	Maldives	Nepal	Sri Lanka U23
Salma Khatun (c); Nahida Akter; Jahanara Alam; Puja Chakraborty; Farjana Haque; Sanjida Islam; Rabeya Khan; Fahima Khatun; Murshida Khatun; Ritu Moni; Sobhana Mostary; Ayesha Rahman; Nigar Sultana; Shamima Sultana; Khadija Tul Kubra	Zoona Mariyam (c); Sumayya Abdul; Hafsa Abdhulla; Aima Aishath; Shamma Ali; Mohamed Fathimath; Naseer Fathimath; Sajaa Fathimath; Latsha Haleemath; Eashal Ibrahim; Kinaanath Ismail; Luthufee Mariyam; Naseem Nabaa; Hamza Niyaz; Shaffaa Saleem	Rubina Chhetry (c); Indu Barma; Apsari Begam; Karuna Bhandari; Dolly Bhatta; Anjali Chand; Mamta Chaudhary; Sonu Khadka; Suman Khatiwada; Saraswati Kumari; Kabita Kunwar; Sarita Magar; Sita Magar; Kajal Shrestha; Roma Thapa	Harshitha Madavi (c); Kavisha Dilhari (vc); Janadi Anali; Lihini Apsara; Sachini De Silva; Sachini Nisansala; Shikari Nuwantha; Shayani Oshadi; Nilakshana Sandamini; Sathya Sandeepani; Tharika Sewwandi; Malsha Shehani; Tharuka Shehani; Umesha Thimashini; Jimanjali Wijenayake

== Round-robin stage ==
=== Points table ===
Team	P	W	L	T	NR	Pts	NRR
Bangladesh	3	3	0	0	0	6	+6.391
Sri Lanka U23	3	2	1	0	0	4	+4.667
Nepal	3	1	2	0	0	2	–0.355
Maldives	3	0	3	0	0	0	–12.627

- Top 2 advanced to the gold medal match
- Bottom 2 advanced to the bronze medal match

=== Fixtures ===
2 December 2019
11:00
Scorecard

Maldives; 16 (10.1 overs)	v	Nepal; 17/0 (0.5 overs)
Hamza Niyaz 9 (11); Anjali Chand 6/0 (2.1 overs)		Kajal Shrestha 13* (5)

Nepal won by 10 wickets
Pokhara Stadium, Pokhara
Umpires: Adhip Pradhan (Nep) and Basu Karn (Nep)
Player of the match: Anjali Chand (Nep)

- Maldives won the toss and elected to bat.
- Anjali Chand, Saraswati Kumari (Nep), Hafsaa Abdhulla, Sumayya Abdul, Aima Aishath, Shamma Ali, Sajaa Fathimath, Latsha Haleemath, Eashal Ibrahim, Kinaanath Ismail, Zoona Maiyaam, Hamza Niaz and Shaffaa Saleem (Mdv) all made their WT20I debuts.
- Anjali Chand set a new record for the best bowling figures in a WT20I, with six wickets for no runs, including a hat-trick from her last three deliveries.

3 December 2019
11:00
Scorecard

Sri Lanka U23; 122/6 (20 overs)	v	Bangladesh; 126/3 (18.3 overs)
Umesha Thimashini 56 (49); Nahida Akter 4/32 (4 overs)		Sanjida Islam 51* (45); Umesha Thimashini 1/13 (2 overs)

Bangladesh won by 7 wickets
Pokhara Stadium, Pokhara
Umpires: Manjul Bhattarai (Nep) and Hiralal Raut (Nep)
Player of the match: Sanjida Islam (Ban)

- Bangladesh won the toss and elected to field.

4 December 2019
09:00
Scorecard

Nepal; 50 (19.2 overs)	v	Bangladesh; 51/0 (7.4 overs)
Rubina Chhetry 13 (29); Rabeya Khan 4/8 (4 overs)		Ayasha Rahman 26* (22)

Bangladesh won by 10 wickets
Pokhara Stadium, Pokhara
Umpires: Adhip Pradhan (Nep) and Basu Karn (Nep)
Player of the match: Rabeya Khan (Ban)

- Bangladesh won the toss and elected to field.
- Rabeya Khan (Ban) made her WT20I debut.

4 December 2019
13:00
Scorecard

Sri Lanka U23; 279/2 (20 overs)	v	Maldives; 30 (14.5 overs)
Harshitha Madavi 106* (47); Shamma Ali 1/57 (4 overs)		Sajaa Fathimath 6 (4); Janadi Anali 3/2 (1.5 overs)

Sri Lanka U23 won by 249 runs
Pokhara Stadium, Pokhara
Umpires: Manjul Bhattarai (Nep) and Sanjay Sigdel (Nep)
Player of the match: Harshitha Madavi (Sri)

- Maldives won the toss and elected to field.

5 December 2019
11:00
Scorecard

Bangladesh; 255/2 (20 overs)	v	Maldives; 6 (12.1 overs)
Nigar Sultana 113* (65); Shamma Ali 1/38 (4 overs)		Shamma Ali 2 (12); Ritu Moni 3/1 (4 overs)

Bangladesh won by 249 runs
Pokhara Stadium, Pokhara
Umpires: Basu Karn (Nep) and Hiralal Raut (Nep)
Player of the match: Nigar Sultana (Bangladesh)

- Bangladesh won the toss and elected to bat.
- Puja Chakraborty (Ban) and Maaha Naseer (Mdv) both made their WT20I debuts.
- The 236 unbeaten runs scored by Nigar Sultana and Fargana Hoque for the third Bangladesh wicket was the highest partnership for any wicket a WT20I match.
- The six runs scored by Maldives Women was the equal lowest team total in a completed WT20I innings.

6 December 2019
11:00
Scorecard

Sri Lanka U23; 118/7 (20 overs)	v	Nepal; 77/9 (20 overs)
Lihini Apsara 37 (27); Sonu Khadka 2/13 (4 overs)		Rubina Chhetry 19 (28); Sachini Nisansala 3/16 (4 overs)

Sri Lanka U23 won by 41 runs
Pokhara Stadium, Pokhara
Umpires: Adhip Pradhan (Nep) and Hiralal Raut (Nep)
Player of the match: Sachini Nisansala (Sri Lanka U23)

- Sri Lanka U23 won the toss and elected to bat.

== Medal round ==
=== Bronze medal match ===
7 December 2019
11:00
Scorecard

Maldives; 8 (11.3 overs)	v	Nepal; 9/0 (1.1 overs)
Aima Aishath 1 (12); Anjali Chand 4/1 (4 overs)		Roma Thapa 5* (4)

Nepal won by 10 wickets
Pokhara Stadium, Pokhara
Umpires: Hiralal Raut (Nepal) and Manjul Bhattari (Nepal)
Player of the match: Anjali Chand (Nepal)

- Maldives won the toss and elected to bat.
- Suman Khatiwada (Nep) made her WT20I debut.

=== Gold medal match ===
8 December 2019
11:00
Scorecard

Bangladesh; 91/8 (20 overs)	v	Sri Lanka U23; 89/9 (20 overs)
Nigar Sultana 29* (38); Umesha Thimashini 4/8 (4 overs)		Harshitha Madavi 32 (33); Nahida Akter 2/9 (4 overs)

Bangladesh won by 2 runs
Pokhara Stadium, Pokhara
Umpires: Basu Karn (Nep) and Adhip Pradhan (Nep)
Player of the match: Nahida Akter (Ban)

- Sri Lanka U23 won the toss and elected to field.

== See also ==
- Cricket at the 2019 South Asian Games – Men's tournament
