= Gandaki Province cricket team =

Nepali domestic cricket team

Gandaki Province
- Nickname: GP
- League: Prime Minister One Day Cup

Personnel
- Captain: Bipin Khatri
- Coach: Rijan Prajoo
- Chairman: Sanjaykant Sigdel
- Owner: Gandaki Province Cricket Association

Team information
- City: Pokhara
- Colours: Yellow
- Established: 2020
- Home ground: Pokhara International Cricket Stadium, Pokhara

History
- No. of titles: 0
- PM Cup wins: 0
- Jay Trophy wins: 0
- Official website: cricketnepal.org.np

Gandaki Province Cricket team is a Nepali professional cricket team, based in the Gandaki Province, Nepal. The team competes in Prime Minister Cup and Jay Trophy. The team is currently being run under the Gandaki Province Cricket Association.

== Stadium ==
- Pokhara International Cricket Stadium
- Eden Heaven Cricket Ground

== Current squad ==
As of 15 April 2025

Gandaki Province Cricket Team Squad for 2026 Men's Prime Minister Cup
Name	Nationality	Birth date	Batting style	Bowling style	NPL Team	Notes
Batsmen
Arjun Kumal	Nepal	20	Right-handed	Right-arm off break	Pokhara Avengers	—N/a
Dinesh Budha Magar	Nepal	21	Right-handed	Right-arm offbreak	—N/a	—N/a
Gaurav BK	Nepal		Left-handed	Right-arm	—N/a	—N/a
All-rounders
Bipin Khatri	Nepal	28	Right-handed	left-arm Slow orthodox	Pokhara Avengers	Captain
Cibrin Shrestha	Nepal	19	Left-handed	left-arm Slow orthodox		
Vansh Chhetri	Nepal	18	Right-handed	Left-arm Leg break	—N/a	—N/a
Muskan Thapa	Nepal	25	Right-handed	Right-arm offbreak	—N/a	—N/a
Sandesh Panthi	Nepal		Right-handed	Right-arm medium fast		—N/a
Wicket-keepers
Deepak Dumre	Nepal	22	Right-handed	—N/a	Karnali Yaks	—N/a
Spin bowlers
Subash Bhandari	Nepal	21	Right-handed	Right-arm offbreak	Biratnagar Kings	—N/a
Aprajit Poudel	Nepal	19	Right-handed	left-arm Slow orthodox	—N/a	—N/a
Kamal Pariyar	Nepal	23	Right-handed	left-arm Slow orthodox	—N/a	—N/a
Pace bowlers
Krishna Poudel	Nepal	20	Right-handed	Right-arm medium fast	—N/a	—N/a
Ankit Neupane	Nepal	26	Right-handed	Right-arm medium fast	—N/a	—N/a
Bishow Karki	Nepal		Right-handed	Right-arm medium	—N/a	—N/a

== Coaching staff ==
As of 18 January 2024

Position	Name
Team manager	N/A
Head coach	Rijan Prajoo
Assistant coach	N/A
Bowling coach	N/A
Under-19s Coach	N/A
Physio	N/A
Trainers	N/A
