= Maldives women's national cricket team =

Cricket team

Maldives
- Flag of Maldives
- Association: Cricket Board of Maldives

International Cricket Council
- ICC status: Associate member (2017); Affiliate member (2001)
- ICC region: Asia
ICC Rankings	Current	Best-ever
T20I	---	

T20 Internationals
- First T20I: v Nepal at Pokhara Rangasala, Pokhara; 2 December 2019
- Last T20I: v Nepal at UKM-YSD Cricket Oval, Bangi; 13 February 2024
T20Is	Played	Won/Lost
Total	6	0/6 (0 ties, 0 no results)
This year	0	0/0 (0 ties, 0 no results)
- As of 13 February 2024

The Maldives national women's cricket team is the team that represents Maldives in international women's cricket. In April 2018, the International Cricket Council (ICC) granted full Women's Twenty20 International (WT20I) status to all its members. Therefore, every Twenty20 match played between Maldives women and other ICC members since 1 July 2018 has the full WT20I status.

The team played its first WT20I matches during the 2019 South Asian Games in December 2019. In the bronze medal play-off match, the Maldives were dismissed for just eight runs, to record the second lowest total in a WT20I match. Only one run came from the bat, with the other seven runs coming from wides. Nine cricketers were dismissed without scoring. Earlier in the tournament, the Maldives lost to Bangladesh by 249 runs, with the Maldives bowled out for just six runs in their innings.

== Records and statistics ==
International Match Summary — Maldives Women

Last updated 13 February 2024

Playing Record
Format	M	W	L	T	NR	Inaugural Match
Twenty20 Internationals	6	0	6	0	0	2 December 2019

=== Twenty20 International ===
T20I record versus other nations

Records complete to WT20I #1777. Last updated 13 February 2024.

Opponent	M	W	L	T	NR	First match	First win
ICC Full members
Bangladesh	1	0	1	0	0	5 December 2019	
ICC Associate members
Bhutan	1	0	1	0	0	10 February 2024	
Hong Kong	1	0	1	0	0	11 February 2024	
Nepal	3	0	3	0	0	2 December 2019	

== Tournament history ==
=== Women's World Cup ===
World Cup record
Year	Round	Position	GP	W	L	T	NR
(England) 1973	Did not qualify/No women's ODI status						
(India) 1978	Did not qualify/No women's ODI status						
(New Zealand) 1982	Did not qualify/No women's ODI status						
(Australia) 1988	Did not qualify/No women's ODI status						
(England) 1993	Did not qualify/No women's ODI status						
(India) 1997	Did not qualify/No women's ODI status						
(New Zealand) 2000	Did not qualify/No women's ODI status						
(South Africa) 2005	Did not qualify/No women's ODI status						
(Australia) 2009	Did not qualify/No women's ODI status						
(India) 2013	Did not qualify/No women's ODI status						
(England) 2017	Did not qualify/No women's ODI status						
(New Zealand) 2022	Did not qualify/No women's ODI status						
(India) 2025	To be determined						
Total	0/12	0 Titles	0	0	0	0	0

=== Women's World T20 ===
Twenty20 World Cup Record
Year	Round	Position	GP	W	L	T	NR
(England) 2009	Did not qualify						
(Cricket West Indies) 2010	Did not qualify						
(Sri Lanka) 2012	Did not qualify						
(Bangladesh) 2014	Did not qualify						
(India) 2016	Did not qualify						
(Cricket West Indies) 2018	Did not qualify						
(Australia) 2020	Did not qualify						
(South Africa) 2023	Did not qualify						
(Bangladesh) 2024	Did not qualify						
Total	0/8	0 Titles	0	0	0	0	0

=== ICC Women's T20 World Cup Qualifier ===
ICC Women's World Twenty20 Qualifier record
Year	Round	Position	GP	W	L	T	NR
(Republic of Ireland) 2013	Did not qualify						
(Thailand) 2015	Did not qualify						
(Netherlands) 2018	Did not qualify						
(Scotland) 2019	Did not qualify						
(United Arab Emirates) 2022	Did not qualify						
(United Arab Emirates) 2024	Did not qualify						
Total	0/6	0 Titles	0	0	0	0	0

=== ICC Women's World Twenty20 Asia Qualifier ===
ICC Women's World Twenty20 Asia Qualifier record
Year	Round	Position	GP	W	L	T	NR
(Thailand) 2017	Did not participate						
(Thailand) 2019	Did not participate						
(United Arab Emirates) 2021	Did not participate						
(Malaysia) 2023	Did not participate						
Total	0/4	0 Titles	0	0	0	0	0

=== Women's Asia Cup ===
Women's Asia Cup Record
Year	Round	Position	GP	W	L	T	NR
2004 (Sri Lanka)	Did not enter (ODI format)						
2005-06 (Pakistan)	Did not enter (ODI format)						
2006 (India)	Did not enter (ODI format)						
2008 (Sri Lanka)	Did not enter (ODI format)						
2012 (China)	Did not qualify						
2016 (Thailand)	Did not qualify						
2018 (Malaysia)	Did not qualify						
2022 (Bangladesh)	Did not qualify						
2024 (Sri Lanka)	Did not qualify						
Total	0/9	0 Titles	0	0	0	0	0

=== ACC Women's Premier Cup ===
ACC Women's Premier Cup record
Year	Round	Position	GP	W	L	T	NR
2024 (Malaysia)	Group stages	–	3	0	3	0	0
Total	1/1	0 Titles	3	0	3	0	0

=== ACC Women's T20 Championship ===
ACC Women's T20 Championship record
Year/Host	Round	Position	GP	W	L	T	NR
(Malaysia) 2009	Did not participate						
(Kuwait) 2011	Did not participate						
(Thailand) 2013	Did not participate						
(Malaysia) 2022	Did not participate						
Total	4/4	0 Titles	0	0	0	0	0

== See also ==
- List of Maldives women Twenty20 International cricketers
