= Stories of Change =

Stories of Change

Stories of Change is a 2008 documentary film by BRAC Pathways of Women Empowerment.

The documentary focuses on the lives of five Bangladeshi women aging from 16 to 60, from different walks of life, different professions, religions and regions of the country.

The film screened at various film festivals:

- Jeevika: South Asia Livelihood Documentary Festival, Delhi (August 28–31, 2008)
- Asiatica Film Mediale, Rome (November 15–23, 2008)
- Goan Peoples' Film Festival: Celebrating Life and Livelihoods (November 21–29, 2008)
- Kolkata International Documentary Film Festival (January 26–30, 2009)
