= 2019 Women's Twenty20 East Asia Cup =

2019 Women's East Asia Cup
- Dates: 19 – 22 September 2019
- Administrator: Korea Cricket Association
- Cricket format: Twenty20 International
- Host: South Korea
- Champions: China (2nd title)
- Runners-up: Hong Kong
- Participants: 4
- Matches: 8
- Most runs: (Japan) Shizuka Miyaji (92)
- Most wickets: (Hong Kong) Kary Chan (14)

The 2019 Women's East Asia Cup was a Women's Twenty20 International (WT20I) cricket tournament, which was held in South Korea in September 2019. All of the matches were played at the Yeonhui Cricket Ground in Incheon, where a round-robin series was followed by a final and a third-place play-off.

The Twenty20 East Asia Cup is an annual competition featuring China, Hong Kong, Japan and South Korea that was first played in 2015 and alternates annually between a men's and women's event. The women's event was won by China in 2015 and by Hong Kong in 2017. The men's events in 2016 and 2018 (both featuring the Hong Kong Dragons – a side representing Hong Kong's Chinese community – instead of their senior national team) had been won by South Korea and Japan, respectively. The 2019 edition was the first to be granted official T20I status after the International Cricket Council (ICC) had granted T20I status to matches between all of its members from 1 July 2018 (women's teams) and 1 January 2019 (men's teams).

China defeated Hong Kong in the final by 14 runs to claim the title. Chinese batter Sun Meng Yao contributed nearly half of her team's runs with an innings of 49*.

== Squads ==
China	Hong Kong	Japan	South Korea
Huang Zhuo (c); Zhang Chan; Li Haoye; Liu Jie; Wu Juan; Han Lili; Zhang Mei; Zi Mei; Wang Meng; Fengfeng Song; Zhang Xiangxue; Chen Xinyu; Sun Meng Yao; Caiyun Zhou	Kary Chan (c); Maryam Bibi; Betty Chan; Dorothea Chan; Hiu Ying Cheung; Yasmin Daswani; Mariko Hill; Emma Lai; Bella Poon; Shanzeen Shahzad; Alison Siu; Pull To; Ruchitha Venkatesh; Mehreen Yousaf	Mai Yanagida (c); Rio Endo; Kiyo Fujikawa; Ayaka Kanada; Ruan Kanai; Miho Kanno; Akari Kano; Akari Kitayama; Shizuka Miyaji; Kasumi Nanno; Erika Oda; Madoka Shiraishi; Kotone Taniguchi; Nao Tokizawa	Seungmin Song (c); Mina Baek; Seri Chang; Kang Choi; Seohee Kim; Sinae Kim; Su Jin Kim; Haliam Kwon; Hee Jung Lee; Hyejin Park; Jiyeon Park; Jiyeon Park Jr.

== Round-robin ==
=== Points table ===
Team	P	W	L	T	NR	Pts	NRR	Status
China	3	2	1	0	0	4	+1.768	Advanced to the final
Hong Kong	3	2	1	0	0	4	+0.559	Advanced to the final
Japan	3	2	1	0	0	4	–0.140	Advanced to the 3rd place play-off
South Korea (H)	3	0	3	0	0	0	–2.167	Advanced to the 3rd place play-off

=== Matches ===
19 September 2019
09:30
Scorecard

Japan; 97/7 (20 overs)	v	South Korea; 85/7 (20 overs)
Ayaka Kanada 29* (35); Hyejin Park 2/14 (2 overs)		Mina Baek 28* (46); Mai Yanagida 2/11 (4 overs)

Japan won by 12 runs
Yeonhui Cricket Ground, Incheon
Umpires: Shahid Gill (Kor) and Ryu Roni (Kor)
Player of the match: Shizuka Miyaji (Jpn)

- South Korea won the toss and elected to field.
- Kiyo Fujikawa (Jpn) made her WT20I debut.

19 September 2019
14:00
Scorecard

Hong Kong; 84/5 (20 overs)	v	China; 79 (19.3 overs)
Yasmin Daswani 20 (37); Li Haoye 1/17 (4 overs)		Huang Zhou 21 (36); Kary Chan 5/7 (3.3 overs)

Hong Kong won by 5 runs
Yeonhui Cricket Ground, Incheon
Umpires: Shahid Gill (Kor) and Ryu Roni (Kor)
Player of the match: Kary Chan (HK)

- Hong Kong won the toss and elected to field.
- Sun Meng Yao (Chn) made her WT20I debut.
- Kary Chan (HK) took her first hat-trick in WT20Is.

20 September 2019
09:30
Scorecard

Hong Kong; 91 (19.5 overs)	v	Japan; 92/8 (18.5 overs)
Ruchitha Venkatesh 25 (40); Miho Kanno 2/14 (4 overs)		Nao Tokizawa 22 (34); Kary Chan 3/7 (3 overs)

Japan won by 2 wickets
Yeonhui Cricket Ground, Incheon
Umpires: Shahid Gill (Kor) and Ryu Roni (Kor)
Player of the match: Nao Tokizawa (Jpn)

- Hong Kong won the toss and elected to field.

20 September 2019
14:00
Scorecard

China; 132/6 (20 overs)	v	South Korea; 51 (19.5 overs)
Zhang Mei 35 (42); Mina Baek 2/21 (4 overs)		Kang Choi 14 (32); Fengfeng Song 4/7 (2.5 overs)

China won by 81 runs
Yeonhui Cricket Ground, Incheon
Umpires: Shahid Gill (Kor) and Ryu Roni (Kor)
Player of the match: Fengfeng Song (Chn)

- South Korea won the toss and elected to field.

21 September 2019
09:30
Scorecard

Hong Kong; 120/5 (20 overs)	v	South Korea; 83/6 (20 overs)
Mariko Hill 43* (34); Seungmin Song 1/10 (4 overs)		Sinae Kim 25 (60); Ruchitha Venkatesh 2/18 (4 overs)

Hong Kong won by 37 runs
Yeonhui Cricket Ground, Incheon
Umpires: Shahid Gill (Kor) and Ryu Roni (Kor)
Player of the match: Mariko Hill (HK)

- South Korea won the toss and elected to field.

21 September 2019
14:00
Scorecard

Japan; 67 (19.3 overs)	v	China; 68/5 (14.2 overs)
Nao Tokizawa 28 (34); Wu Juan 3/5 (4 overs)		Caiyun Zhou 18 (22); Mai Yanagida 2/14 (4 overs)

China won by 5 wickets
Yeonhui Cricket Ground, Incheon
Umpires: Shahid Gill (Kor) and Ryu Roni (Kor)
Player of the match: Wu Juan (Chn)

- Japan won the toss and elected to bat.

== Play-offs ==
=== Third-place play-off ===
22 September 2019
14:00
Scorecard

Japan; 129/6 (20 overs)	v	South Korea; 97/8 (20 overs)
Shizuka Miyaji 47 (44); Mina Baek 4/17 (4 overs)		Sinae Kim 23 (44); Nao Tokizawa 3/6 (4 overs)

Japan won by 32 runs
Yeonhui Cricket Ground, Incheon
Player of the match: Shizuka Miyaji (Jpn)

- South Korea won the toss and elected to field.

=== Final ===
22 September 2019
09:30
Scorecard

China; 104/4 (20 overs)	v	Hong Kong; 90/9 (20 overs)
Sun Meng Yao 49* (59); Betty Chan 2/14 (4 overs)		Kary Chan 21 (20); Liu Jie 3/17 (4 overs)

China won by 14 runs
Yeonhui Cricket Ground, Incheon
Player of the match: Sun Meng Yao (Chn)

- Hong Kong won the toss and elected to field.
