= Cricket at the Asian Games =

- Governing bodies: ICC (World) / ACC (Asia)
- Events: 2 (men: 1; women: 1)

Games
- 1951; 1954; 1958; 1962; 1966; 1970; 1974; 1978; 1982; 1986; 1990; 1994; 1998; 2002; 2006; 2010; 2014; 2018; 2022; 2026
- Medalists

Cricket has been an Asian Games event since the 2010 Asian Games, except at the 2018 Asian Games.

== History ==
The last time cricket featured in a major multi-sport event was at the 1998 Commonwealth Games held in Kuala Lumpur, Malaysia. The gold medal was won on that occasion by South Africa, who defeated Australia by 4 wickets in the final with New Zealand winning the bronze medal. At a general meeting of the Olympic Council of Asia, held in Kuwait on 17 April 2007, it was announced that cricket would be included as a medal sport in the 2010 Asian Games to be held in Guangzhou. Matches would be played on a Twenty20, 20-overs per side format.

Following the announcement, Asian Cricket Council Chief Executive Syed Ashraful Huq said "Cricket will receive a major boost across Asia and in particular China, as a result of this enlightened decision. The Asian Cricket Council pledges its support to the Guangzhou games organizers in order to make the event a success."

Asian cricketing powerhouses India and Pakistan have been the drivers behind the inclusion of cricket in the Asian Games. The Test status nations in the Asian Cricket Council, Bangladesh, India, Pakistan and Sri Lanka would compete with the initial plan that the Associate teams such as Nepal would also be invited to play in the inaugural competition. China will compete as the host nation which serves as a boost for the Chinese Cricket Association which has boldly stated its ambition of China becoming a force in one-day cricket by the 2019 World Cup.

The plans for including Associate nations in the Asian Games was later changed, along with the format that the competition would take place in, changing from 50 over matches to Twenty20 matches. It was decided that the 2009 ACC Twenty20 Cup would serve as the pre-tournament qualifying competition. Afghanistan qualified as winners of the tournament along with the national teams of Oman and the United Arab Emirates.

Cricket was not held in 2018 Asian Games but in 2019, during Olympic Council of Asia's General Assembly it was decided the return of the sport in the 2022 Asian Games, which will be held in Hangzhou, China.

The inclusion of cricket in 2026 Asian Games in Aichi and Nagoya was announced in April 2025. The Asian Cricket Council pushed for the bid and OCA President Randhir Singh was hopeful about it prior to decision.

== Editions ==
Venue:

- 2010 : City Forex Stadium
- 2014 : Yeonhui Cricket Ground
- 2022 : Pingfeng Campus Cricket Ground
- 2026 : Korogi Sports Park

=== Men ===
#	Year	Host	Final			Third place match			Teams
#	Year	Host	Winner	Score	Runner-up	3rd place	Score	4th place	Teams
1	2010	(China); Guangzhou	Bangladesh	5 wickets	Afghanistan	Pakistan	6 wickets	Sri Lanka	9
2	2014	(South Korea); Incheon	Sri Lanka	68 runs	Afghanistan	Bangladesh	27 runs	Hong Kong	10
3	2022	(China); Hangzhou	India	No result Win by higher seeding	Afghanistan	Bangladesh	6 Wickets (DLS)	Pakistan	14
4	2026	(Japan); Aichi	India	19 runs	Pakistan	Sri Lanka	63 runs	Bangladesh	10

=== Women ===
#	Year	Host	Final			Third place match			Teams
#	Year	Host	Winner	Score	Runner-up	3rd place	Score	4th place	Teams
1	2010	(China); Guangzhou	Pakistan	10 wickets	Bangladesh	Japan	7 wickets	China	8
2	2014	(South Korea); Incheon	Pakistan	4 runs	Bangladesh	Sri Lanka	5 wickets	China	10
3	2022	(China); Hangzhou	India	19 runs	Sri Lanka	Bangladesh	5 wickets	Pakistan	9
4	2026	(Japan); Aichi	India	147 runs	Sri Lanka	Pakistan	31 runs	Bangladesh	8

== Medal table ==
=== Total ===
Rank	Nation	Gold	Silver	Bronze	Total
1	India	4	0	0	4
2	Pakistan	2	1	2	5
3	Bangladesh	1	2	3	6
4	Sri Lanka	1	2	2	5
5	Afghanistan	0	3	0	3
6	Japan	0	0	1	1
Totals (6 entries)		8	8	8	24

=== Men ===
Rank	Nation	Gold	Silver	Bronze	Total
1	India	2	0	0	2
2	Bangladesh	1	0	2	3
3	Sri Lanka	1	0	1	2
4	Afghanistan	0	3	0	3
5	Pakistan	0	1	1	2
Totals (5 entries)		4	4	4	12

=== Women ===
Rank	Nation	Gold	Silver	Bronze	Total
1	Pakistan	2	0	1	3
2	India	2	0	0	2
3	Bangladesh	0	2	1	3
3	Sri Lanka	0	2	1	3
5	Japan	0	0	1	1
Totals (5 entries)		4	4	4	12

== Performance by nations ==
Legend

- QF: Quarterfinals
- R1: First Round

=== Men ===
Team	(China) 2010	(South Korea) 2014	(China) 2022	(Japan) 2026	Total
Afghanistan	2nd	2nd	2nd	QF	4
Bangladesh	1st	3rd	3rd	4th	4
Cambodia	—	—	R1	—	1
China	QF	R1	—	—	2
Hong Kong	QF	4th	QF	QF	4
India	—	—	1st	1st	2
Japan	—	—	R1	R1	2
Kuwait	—	QF	—	—	1
Malaysia	QF	QF	QF	QF	4
Maldives	R1	R1	R1	—	3
Mongolia	—	—	R1	—	1
Nepal	QF	QF	QF	QF	4
Oman	—	—	—	R1	1
Pakistan	3rd	—	4th	2nd	3
Singapore	—	—	R1	—	1
South Korea	—	QF	—	—	1
Sri Lanka	4th	1st	QF	3rd	4
Thailand	—	—	R1	—	1
Total (18)	9	10	14	10	_

=== Women ===
Team	(China) 2010	(South Korea) 2014	(China) 2022	(Japan) 2026	Total
Bangladesh	2nd	2nd	3rd	4th	4
China	4th	4th	—	QF	3
Hong Kong	R1	QF	QF	—	3
India	—	—	1st	1st	2
Indonesia	—	—	QF	—	1
Japan	3rd	QF	—	QF	3
Malaysia	R1	R1	QF	QF	4
Mongolia	—	—	R1	—	1
Nepal	R1	QF	—	—	2
Pakistan	1st	1st	4th	3rd	4
South Korea	—	R1	—	—	1
Sri Lanka	—	3rd	2nd	2nd	3
Thailand	R1	QF	QF	QF	4
Total (13)	8	10	9	8	_

== See also ==
- Cricket at the Summer Olympics
- Cricket at the Commonwealth Games
- Cricket at the Pan American Games
