= 2017 Women's Twenty20 East Asia Cup =

2017 Women's East Asia Cup
- Dates: 21 – 24 September 2017
- Administrator: Hong Kong Cricket Association
- Cricket format: Twenty20
- Host: Hong Kong
- Champions: Hong Kong (1st title)
- Runners-up: Japan
- Participants: 4
- Matches: 8
- Most runs: (Hong Kong) Yasmin Daswani (179)
- Most wickets: (Japan) Etsuko Kobayashi (6)

The 2017 Women's East Asia Cup was a Twenty20 (T20) cricket tournament, which was held in Hong Kong in September 2017. The venues for the round-robin stage matches were the Hong Kong Cricket Club in Wong Nai, and the Mission Road Ground in Mong Kok. The tournament was completed with the final and third-place play-off, which were played at the Kowloon Cricket Club.

The Twenty20 East Asia Cup is an annual competition featuring China, Hong Kong, Japan and South Korea that was first played in 2015 and alternates annually between a men's and women's event. China were the defending women's champions, having won the inaugural edition in 2015 at the Yeonhui Cricket Ground in Incheon, South Korea. South Korea had won the inaugural men's edition in 2016. The matches did not have Twenty20 International status.

Hong Kong defeated Japan in a close contest in the final on 24 September 2017 to win the Women's East Asia Cup for the first time.

== Squads ==
China	Hong Kong	Japan	South Korea
Zhang Chan (c); Li Haoye; Han Lili; Zhongyuan Lyu; Tian Qi; Shi Rui; Fengfeng Song; Wang Luo Wanyu; Zhang Xiangxue; Ying Xiaoxiao; Chen Xinyu; Zhang Yanling; Caiyun Zhou; Mingyue Zhu	Mariko Hill (c); Betty Chan; Charlotte Chan; Kary Chan; Yasmin Daswani; Jenefer Davies; Keenu Gill; Annie Ho; Emma Lai; Bella Poon; Shanzeen Shahzad; Yee Shan To; Ruchitha Venkatesh; Natural Yip	Mai Yanagida (c); Miho Asama; Rio Endo; Erika Ida; Kanae Ishimoto; Miho Kanno; Kisaki Iwahashi; Akari Kitayama; Etsuko Kobayashi; Mayu Suzuki; Shizuka Miyaji; Madoka Shiraishi; Sonia Wylde; Eri Yamaguchi	Seungmin Song (c); Mina Baek; Seri Chang; Kang Choi; Unhwa Hyun; Seohee Kim; Sinae Kim; Su Jin Kim; Haliam Kwon; Hee Jung Lee; Hyejin Park; Jiyeon Park; Jiyeon Park jnr; So Hyeon Park

== Round-robin ==
=== Points table ===
Team	P	W	L	T	NR	Pts	NRR	Status
Hong Kong (H)	3	2	0	0	1	5	+4.450	Advanced to the final
Japan	3	2	0	0	1	5	+0.470	Advanced to the final
South Korea	3	0	2	0	1	1	–2.525	Advanced to the 3rd place play-off
China	3	0	2	0	1	1	–2.603	Advanced to the 3rd place play-off

=== Matches ===
21 September 2017
Scorecard

Japan; 110/8 (20 overs)	v	South Korea; 101/8 (20 overs)
Miho Kanno 22 (24); Jiyeon Park 2/12 (3 overs)		Jiyeon Park 27 (45); Etsuko Kobayashi 4/24 (4 overs)

Japan Women won by 9 runs
Hong Kong Cricket Club, Wong Nai
Umpires: John Prakash (HK) and Ramasamy Venkatesh (HK)
Player of the match: Etsuko Kobayashi (Jpn)

- South Korea Women won the toss and elected to field.

21 September 2017
Scorecard

Hong Kong; 161/3 (20 overs)	v	China; 75/5 (20 overs)
Yasmin Daswani 71* (68); Tian Qi 2/23 (4 overs)		Zhang Chan 34* (43); Betty Chan 2/19 (4 overs)

Hong Kong Women won by 86 runs
Hong Kong Cricket Club, Wong Nai
Umpires: John Prakash (HK) and Ramasamy Venkatesh (HK)
Player of the match: Yasmin Daswani (HK)

- China Women won the toss and elected to field.

22 September 2017
Scorecard

China; 85/6 (17 overs)	v	Japan; 88/3 (15.4 overs)
Zhang Chan 23 (42); Etsuko Kobayashi 2/23 (4 overs)		Mai Yanagida 42 (48); Shi Rui 1/14 (2 overs)

Japan Women won by 7 wickets (DLS method)
Hong Kong Cricket Club, Wong Nai
Umpires: Niaz Ali (HK) and Tabarak Dar (HK)
Player of the match: Mai Yanagida (Jpn)

- China Women won the toss and elected to bat.
- The match was reduced to 17 overs per side and Japan Women were set a revised target of 88 runs to win due to rain.

22 September 2017
Scorecard

Hong Kong; 151/3 (20 overs)	v	South Korea; 59/8 (20 overs)
Yasmin Daswani 77 (64); So Hyeon Park 1/32 (4 overs)		Sinae Kim 14 (27); Annie Ho 2/2 (3 overs)

Hong Kong Women won by 92 runs
Hong Kong Cricket Club, Wong Nai
Umpires: Niaz Ali (HK) and Tabarak Dar (HK)
Player of the match: Yasmin Daswani (HK)

- Hong Kong Women won the toss and elected to bat.

23 September 2017
Scorecard

Hong Kong	v	Japan

Match abandoned
Mission Road Ground, Mong Kok
Umpires: Tauseef Bukhari (HK) and Gary Panons (HK)

- No toss.
- No play was possible due to rain.

23 September 2017
Scorecard

China	v	South Korea

Match abandoned
Mission Road Ground, Mong Kok
Umpires: Tauseef Bukhari (HK) and Gary Panons (HK)

- No toss.
- No play was possible due to rain.

== Play-offs ==
=== Third-place play-off ===
24 September 2017
Scorecard

China; 74/6 (15 overs)	v	South Korea; 66/9 (15 overs)
Caiyun Zhou 17 (20); Seungmin Song 3/16 (3 overs)		Jiyeon Park 18* (31); Tian Qi 3/13 (3 overs)

China Women won by 8 runs
Kowloon Cricket Club
Umpires: Tabarak Dar (HK) and Ramasamy Venkatesh (HK)
Player of the match: Tian Qi (Chn)

- China Women won the toss and elected to bat.
- The match was reduced to 15 overs per side due to rain.

=== Final ===
24 September 2017
Scorecard

Japan; 90/4 (20 overs)	v	Hong Kong; 85/5 (16.2 overs)
Mai Yanagida 35 (56); Betty Chan 2/3 (4 overs)		Yasmin Daswani 31 (49); Sonia Wylde 1/7 (1 over)

Hong Kong Women won by 5 wickets (DLS method)
Kowloon Cricket Club
Umpires: Tabarak Dar (HK) and Ramasamy Venkatesh (HK)

- Japan Women won the toss and elected to bat.
- Hong Kong Women were set a revised target of 83 runs to win from 18 overs due to rain.
