= International cricket in 2014 =

International cricket season

The 2014 international cricket season is from May 2014 to September 2014. The Ireland cricket team was scheduled to play three One Day Internationals in Lahore, Pakistan, but they were cancelled after the 2014 Jinnah International Airport terrorist attack in Karachi.

== Season overview ==
International tours
Start date	Home team	Away team	Results [Matches]		
Start date	Home team	Away team	Test	ODI	T20I
6 May 2014	Ireland	Sri Lanka	—	0–1 [2]	—
9 May 2014	Scotland	England	—	0–1 [1]	—
20 May 2014	England	Sri Lanka	0–1 [2]	2–3 [5]	0–1 [1]
8 June 2014	West Indies	New Zealand	1–2 [3]	—	1–1 [2]
15 June 2014	Bangladesh	India	—	0–2 [3]	—
6 July 2014	Sri Lanka	South Africa	0–1 [2]	1–2 [3]	—
9 July 2014	England	India	3–1 [5]	1–3 [5]	1–0 [1]
18 July 2014	Zimbabwe	Afghanistan	—	2–2 [4]	—
6 August 2014	Sri Lanka	Pakistan	2–0 [2]	2–1 [3]	—
9 August 2014	Zimbabwe	South Africa	0–1 [1]	0–3 [3]	—
20 August 2014	West Indies	Bangladesh	2–0 [2]	3–0 [3]	0–0 [1]
8 September 2014	Ireland	Scotland	—	2–1 [3]	—
International tournaments
Start date	Tournament			Winners	
25 August 2014	Zimbabwe Tri-Series			South Africa	
Women's international tours
Start date	Home team	Away team	Results [Matches]		
Start date	Home team	Away team	WTest	WODI	WT20I
13 August 2014	England	India	0–1 [1]	2–0 [3]	—
21 August 2014	Australia	Pakistan	—	4–0 [4]	4–0 [4]
1 September 2014	England	South Africa	—	—	3–0 [3]
9 September 2014	Ireland	South Africa	—	—	0–3 [3]
12 September 2014	West Indies	New Zealand	—	4–0 [4]	1–2 [3]
Minor tours
Start date	Home team	Away team	Results [Matches]		
Start date	Home team	Away team	FC	ODD	T20
1 July 2014	Scotland	Netherlands	—	1–1 [3]	—
27 July 2014	Zimbabwe	Afghanistan	1–1 [2]	—	—
Minor tournaments
Start date	Tournament			Winners	
1 May 2014	(Malaysia) 2014 ACC Premier League			Afghanistan	
22 June 2014	(Singapore) World Cricket League Division Four			Malaysia	
20 September 2014	(South Africa) 2014 ICC Africa Twenty20 Division Two			Ghana	
27 September 2014	(South Korea) 2014 Asian Games			Sri Lanka	
Other Matches
Start date	Tournament			Winners	
5 July 2014	(England) Bicentenary Celebration match			Marylebone Cricket Club	

== Rankings ==
The following are the rankings at the beginning of the season.

ICC Test Championship 6 March 2014
Rank	Team	Matches	Points	Rating
1	Australia	32	3955	123
2	South Africa	23	2831	123
3	Pakistan	20	2064	103
4	India	23	2343	102
5	England	33	3301	100
6	Sri Lanka	25	2398	96
7	New Zealand	30	2787	93
8	West Indies	23	1710	74
9	Zimbabwe	8	322	40
10	Bangladesh	14	287	21

ICC ODI Championship 8 March 2014
Rank	Team	Matches	Points	Rating
1	Australia	67	7579	117
2	Sri Lanka	47	5505	113
3	India	64	7174	112
4	South Africa	44	4825	110
5	England	50	5424	108
6	Pakistan	62	6287	101
7	New Zealand	43	4048	94
8	West Indies	52	4674	90
9	Bangladesh	32	2519	79
10	Zimbabwe	26	1439	55
11	Ireland	12	451	38
12	Afghanistan	10	299	30

ICC T20I Championship 6 April 2014
Rank	Team	Matches	Points	Rating
1	Sri Lanka	28	3714	133
2	India	21	2725	130
3	Pakistan	34	4070	120
4	South Africa	30	3542	118
5	West Indies	29	3304	114
6	Australia	29	3201	110
7	New Zealand	27	2891	107
8	England	31	3133	101
9	Ireland	13	1108	85
10	Bangladesh	18	1280	71
11	Afghanistan	14	928	66
12	Netherlands	15	932	62
13	Zimbabwe	14	695	50
14	Scotland	11	545	50
15	Kenya	15	633	42
16	Canada	6	11	2

== May ==
=== 2014 ACC Premier League ===
Pos	Team	Pld	W	L	T	NR	Pts	NRR
1	Afghanistan	5	4	1	0	0	8	1.062
2	United Arab Emirates	5	3	2	0	0	6	0.214
3	Nepal	5	3	2	0	0	6	−0.024
4	Oman	5	3	2	0	0	6	−0.082
5	Hong Kong	5	1	4	0	0	2	−0.132
6	Malaysia	5	1	4	0	0	2	−0.951

Group stage
No.	Date	Team 1	Captain 1	Team 2	Captain 2	Venue	Result
ODI 3487	1 May	Afghanistan	Mohammad Nabi	Hong Kong	Jamie Atkinson	Bayuemas Oval, Kuala Lumpur	Afghanistan by 6 wickets
Match 2	1 May	Malaysia	Ahmed Faiz	Oman	Sultan Ahmed	Kinrara Academy Oval, Kuala Lumpur	Oman by 74 runs
Match 3	1 May	Nepal	Paras Khadka	United Arab Emirates	Khurram Khan	Selangor Turf Club, Kuala Lumpur	Nepal by 4 wickets
ODI 3488	2 May	Afghanistan	Mohammad Nabi	United Arab Emirates	Khurram Khan	Kinrara Academy Oval, Kuala Lumpur	Afghanistan by 70 runs
Match 5	2 May	Malaysia	Ahmed Faiz	Nepal	Paras Khadka	Bayuemas Oval, Kuala Lumpur	Nepal by 5 wickets
Match 6	2 May	Hong Kong	Jamie Atkinson	Oman	Sultan Ahmed	Selangor Turf Club, Kuala Lumpur	Oman by 9 runs
Match 7	4 May	Malaysia	Ahmed Faiz	Afghanistan	Mohammad Nabi	Bayuemas Oval, Kuala Lumpur	Malaysia by 3 wickets
ODI 3489	4 May	Hong Kong	Jamie Atkinson	United Arab Emirates	Khurram Khan	Kinrara Academy Oval, Kuala Lumpur	United Arab Emirates by 2 wickets
Match 9	4 May	Nepal	Paras Khadka	Oman	Sultan Ahmed	Selangor Turf Club, Kuala Lumpur	Oman by 2 wickets
Match 10	5 May	Afghanistan	Mohammad Nabi	Oman	Sultan Ahmed	Selangor Turf Club, Kuala Lumpur	Afghanistan by 5 wickets
Match 11	5 May	Hong Kong	Jamie Atkinson	Nepal	Paras Khadka	Bayuemas Oval, Kuala Lumpur	Nepal by 7 wickets (D/L)
Match 12	5 May	Malaysia	Ahmed Faiz	United Arab Emirates	Khurram Khan	Kinrara Academy Oval, Kuala Lumpur	United Arab Emirates by 6 wickets
Match 13	7 May	Afghanistan	Mohammad Nabi	Nepal	Paras Khadka	Kinrara Academy Oval, Kuala Lumpur	Afghanistan by 108 runs (D/L)
Match 14	7 May	Oman	Sultan Ahmed	United Arab Emirates	Khurram Khan	Bayuemas Oval, Kuala Lumpur	United Arab Emirates by 57 runs
Match 15	7 May	Malaysia	Ahmed Faiz	Hong Kong	Jamie Atkinson	Selangor Turf Club, Kuala Lumpur	Hong Kong by 4 wickets

=== Sri Lanka in Ireland ===
ODI Series
No.	Date	Home captain	Away captain	Venue	Result
ODI 3490	6 May	William Porterfield	Angelo Mathews	Clontarf Cricket Club Ground, Dublin	Sri Lanka by 79 runs
ODI 3490a	8 May	William Porterfield	Angelo Mathews	Clontarf Cricket Club Ground, Dublin	Match abandoned

=== England in Scotland ===
Only ODI
No.	Date	Home captain	Away captain	Venue	Result
ODI 3491	9 May	Kyle Coetzer	Alastair Cook	Mannofield Park, Aberdeen	England by 39 runs (D/L)

=== Sri Lanka in England ===
Only T20I
No.	Date	Home captain	Away captain	Venue	Result
T20I 401	20 May	Eoin Morgan	Lasith Malinga	The Oval, London	Sri Lanka by 9 runs
ODI series
No.	Date	Home captain	Away captain	Venue	Result
ODI 3492	22 May	Alastair Cook	Angelo Mathews	The Oval, London	England by 81 runs (D/L)
ODI 3493	25 May	Eoin Morgan	Angelo Mathews	Riverside Ground, Chester-le-Street	Sri Lanka by 157 runs
ODI 3494	28 May	Alastair Cook	Angelo Mathews	Old Trafford, Manchester	England by 10 wickets
ODI 3495	31 May	Alastair Cook	Angelo Mathews	Lord's, London	Sri Lanka by 7 runs
ODI 3496	3 June	Alastair Cook	Angelo Mathews	Edgbaston, Birmingham	Sri Lanka by 6 wickets
Test series
No.	Date	Home captain	Away captain	Venue	Result
Test 2124	12–16 June	Alastair Cook	Angelo Mathews	Lord's, London	Match drawn
Test 2126	20–24 June	Alastair Cook	Angelo Mathews	Headingley, Leeds	Sri Lanka by 100 runs

== June ==
=== New Zealand in the West Indies ===
Test series
No.	Date	Home captain	Away captain	Venue	Result
Test 2123	8–12 June	Denesh Ramdin	Brendon McCullum	Sabina Park, Kingston, Jamaica	New Zealand by 186 runs
Test 2125	16–20 June	Denesh Ramdin	Brendon McCullum	Queen's Park Oval, Port of Spain, Trinidad	West Indies by 10 wickets
Test 2127	26–30 June	Denesh Ramdin	Brendon McCullum	Kensington Oval, Bridgetown, Barbados	New Zealand by 53 runs
T20I series
No.	Date	Home captain	Away captain	Venue	Result
T20I 402	5 July	Daren Sammy	Brendon McCullum	Windsor Park, Roseau, Dominica	New Zealand by 12 runs (D/L)
T20I 403	6 July	Daren Sammy	Kane Williamson	Windsor Park, Roseau, Dominica	West Indies by 39 runs

=== India in Bangladesh ===
ODI series
No.	Date	Home captain	Away captain	Venue	Result
ODI 3497	15 June	Mushfiqur Rahim	Suresh Raina	Sher-e-Bangla National Cricket Stadium, Mirpur	India by 7 wickets (D/L)
ODI 3498	17 June	Mushfiqur Rahim	Suresh Raina	Sher-e-Bangla National Cricket Stadium, Mirpur	India by 47 runs (D/L)
ODI 3499	19 June	Mushfiqur Rahim	Suresh Raina	Sher-e-Bangla National Cricket Stadium, Mirpur	No result

=== 2014 ICC World Cricket League Division Four ===
==== Points Table ====
Pos	Team	Pld	W	L	T	NR	Pts	NRR
1	Singapore	5	4	1	0	0	8	0.170
2	Malaysia	5	4	1	0	0	8	0.117
3	Denmark	5	3	2	0	0	6	0.710
4	Italy	5	2	3	0	0	4	−0.020
5	Oman	5	1	4	0	0	2	0.003
6	Jersey	5	1	4	0	0	2	−0.974

Group stage
No.	Date	Team 1	Captain 1	Team 2	Captain 2	Venue	Result
Match 1	21 June	Singapore	Saad Janjua	Denmark	Michael Pedersen	Kallang Ground, Singapore	Denmark by 70 runs
Match 2	21 June	Oman	Sultan Ahmed	Italy	Damian Crowley	The Padang, Singapore	Italy by 3 wickets
Match 3	21 June	Malaysia	Ahmed Faiz	Jersey	Peter Gough	Indian Association, Singapore	Malaysia by 3 wickets
Match 4	22 June	Malaysia	Ahmed Faiz	Denmark	Michael Pedersen	Kallang Ground, Singapore	Malaysia by 6 wickets
Match 5	22 June	Oman	Sultan Ahmed	Jersey	Peter Gough	The Padang, Singapore	Oman by 7 wickets
Match 6	22 June	Singapore	Saad Janjua	Italy	Damian Crowley	Indian Association, Singapore	Singapore by 9 wickets
Match 7	24 June	Jersey	Peter Gough	Italy	Damian Crowley	Kallang Ground, Singapore	Jersey by 3 wickets
Match 8	24 June	Singapore	Saad Janjua	Malaysia	Ahmed Faiz	The Padang, Singapore	Singapore by 48 runs
Match 9	24 June	Oman	Sultan Ahmed	Denmark	Michael Pedersen	Indian Association, Singapore	Denmark by 14 runs
Match 10	25 June	Singapore	Saad Janjua	Oman	Sultan Ahmed	Kallang Ground, Singapore	Singapore by 2 wickets
Match 11	25 June	Denmark	Michael Pedersen	Jersey	Peter Gough	The Padang, Singapore	Denmark by 134 runs
Match 12	25 June	Malaysia	Ahmed Faiz	Italy	Damian Crowley	Indian Association, Singapore	Malaysia by 6 runs
Match 13	27 June	Malaysia	Ahmed Faiz	Oman	Sultan Ahmed	Kallang Ground, Singapore	Malaysia by 6 wickets
Match 14	27 June	Denmark	Michael Pedersen	Italy	Damian Crowley	The Padang, Singapore	Italy by 6 wickets
Match 15	27 June	Singapore	Saad Janjua	Jersey	Peter Gough	Indian Association, Singapore	Singapore by 5 wickets
Playoffs
No.	Date	Team 1	Captain 1	Team 2	Captain 2	Venue	Result
5th place playoff	28 June	Oman	Sultan Ahmed	Jersey	Peter Gough	Indian Association, Singapore	Oman by 36 runs
3rd place playoff	28 June	Denmark	Michael Pedersen	Italy	Damian Crowley	The Padang, Singapore	Denmark by 35 runs
Final	28 June	Singapore	Saad Janjua	Malaysia	Ahmed Faiz	Kallang Ground, Singapore	Malaysia by 57 runs

==== Final standings ====
===== Final Placings =====
Pos	Team	Status
1st	Malaysia	Promoted to 2014 Division Three
2nd	Singapore	Promoted to 2014 Division Three
3rd	Denmark	Remain in 2016 Division Four
4th	Italy	Remain in 2016 Division Four
5th	Oman	Relegated to 2016 Division Five
6th	Jersey	Relegated to 2016 Division Five

== July ==
=== Netherlands in Scotland ===
List A series
No.	Date	Home captain	Away captain	Venue	Result
1st List-A	1 July	Kyle Coetzer	Peter Borren	Titwood, Glasgow	Netherlands by 44 runs
2nd List-A	2 July	Kyle Coetzer	Peter Borren	Titwood, Glasgow	Scotland by 144 runs (D/L)
3rd List-A	4 July	Kyle Coetzer	Peter Borren	Titwood, Glasgow	Match abandoned

=== Bicentenary Celebration match ===
Only One-Day Match
No.	Date	Team 1	Captain 1	Team 2	Captain 2	Venue	Result
Only Match	5 July	Marylebone Cricket Club	Sachin Tendulkar	Rest of the World XI	Shane Warne	Lord's, London	Marylebone Cricket Club by 7 wickets

=== South Africa in Sri Lanka ===
ODI series
No.	Date	Home captain	Away captain	Venue	Result
ODI 3500	6 July	Angelo Mathews	AB de Villiers	R. Premadasa Stadium, Colombo	South Africa by 75 runs
ODI 3501	9 July	Angelo Mathews	AB de Villiers	Pallekele International Cricket Stadium, Pallekele	Sri Lanka by 87 runs
ODI 3502	12 July	Angelo Mathews	AB de Villiers	Mahinda Rajapaksa International Cricket Stadium, Hambantota	South Africa by 82 runs
Test series
No.	Date	Home captain	Away captain	Venue	Result
Test 2129	16–20 July	Angelo Mathews	Hashim Amla	Galle International Stadium, Galle	South Africa by 153 runs
Test 2131	24–28 July	Angelo Mathews	Hashim Amla	Sinhalese Sports Club Ground, Colombo	Match drawn

=== India in England ===
Test series
No.	Date	Home captain	Away captain	Venue	Result
Test 2128	9–13 July	Alastair Cook	Mahendra Singh Dhoni	Trent Bridge, Nottingham	Match drawn
Test 2130	17–21 July	Alastair Cook	Mahendra Singh Dhoni	Lord's, London	India by 95 runs
Test 2132	27–31 July	Alastair Cook	Mahendra Singh Dhoni	The Rose Bowl, Southampton	England by 266 runs
Test 2134	7–11 August	Alastair Cook	Mahendra Singh Dhoni	Old Trafford, Manchester	England by an innings and 54 runs
Test 2137	15–19 August	Alastair Cook	Mahendra Singh Dhoni	The Oval, London	England by an innings and 244 runs
ODI series
No.	Date	Home captain	Away captain	Venue	Result
ODI 3513a	25 August	Alastair Cook	Mahendra Singh Dhoni	County Ground, Bristol	Match abandoned
ODI 3517	27 August	Alastair Cook	Mahendra Singh Dhoni	SWALEC Stadium, Cardiff	India by 133 runs (D/L)
ODI 3520	30 August	Alastair Cook	Mahendra Singh Dhoni	Trent Bridge, Nottingham	India by 6 wickets
ODI 3523	2 September	Alastair Cook	Mahendra Singh Dhoni	Edgbaston, Birmingham	India by 9 wickets
ODI 3525	5 September	Alastair Cook	Mahendra Singh Dhoni	Headingley, Leeds	England by 41 runs
T20I 305
No.	Date	Home captain	Away captain	Venue	Result
T20I 405	7 September	Eoin Morgan	Mahendra Singh Dhoni	Edgbaston, Birmingham	England by 3 runs

=== Afghanistan in Zimbabwe ===
ODI series
No.	Date	Home captain	Away captain	Venue	Result
ODI 3503	18 July	Brendan Taylor	Mohammad Nabi	Queens Sports Club, Bulawayo	Zimbabwe by 6 wickets
ODI 3504	20 July	Brendan Taylor	Mohammad Nabi	Queens Sports Club, Bulawayo	Zimbabwe by 8 wickets
ODI 3505	22 July	Brendan Taylor	Mohammad Nabi	Queens Sports Club, Bulawayo	Afghanistan by 2 wickets
ODI 3506	24 July	Brendan Taylor	Mohammad Nabi	Queens Sports Club, Bulawayo	Afghanistan by 100 runs
4-Day Matches
No.	Date	Home captain	Away captain	Venue	Result
1st Match	27–30 July	Regis Chakabva	Mirwais Ashraf	Country Club, Harare	Afghanistan by 35 runs
2nd Match	2–5 August	Tino Mawoyo	Mirwais Ashraf	Country Club, Harare	Zimbabwe by 8 wickets

== August ==
=== Pakistan in Sri Lanka ===
Test Series
No.	Date	Home captain	Away captain	Venue	Result
Test 2133	6–10 August	Angelo Mathews	Misbah-ul-Haq	Galle International Stadium, Galle	Sri Lanka by 7 wickets
Test 2136	14–18 August	Angelo Mathews	Misbah-ul-Haq	Sinhalese Sports Club Ground, Colombo	Sri Lanka by 105 runs
ODI series
No.	Date	Home captain	Away captain	Venue	Result
ODI 3512	23 August	Angelo Mathews	Misbah-ul-Haq	Mahinda Rajapaksa International Cricket Stadium, Hambantota	Pakistan by 4 wickets (D/L)
ODI 3515	26 August	Angelo Mathews	Misbah-ul-Haq	Mahinda Rajapaksa International Cricket Stadium, Hambantota	Sri Lanka by 77 runs
ODI 3519	30 August	Angelo Mathews	Misbah-ul-Haq	Rangiri Dambulla International Stadium, Dambulla	Sri Lanka by 7 wickets (D/L)

=== South Africa in Zimbabwe ===
Only Test
No.	Date	Home captain	Away captain	Venue	Result
Test 2135	9–13 August	Brendan Taylor	Hashim Amla	Harare Sports Club, Harare	South Africa by 9 wickets
ODI series
No.	Date	Home captain	Away captain	Venue	Result
ODI 3507	17 August	Elton Chigumbura	AB de Villiers	Queens Sports Club, Bulawayo	South Africa by 93 runs
ODI 3508	19 August	Elton Chigumbura	AB de Villiers	Queens Sports Club, Bulawayo	South Africa by 61 runs
ODI 3510	21 August	Elton Chigumbura	Faf du Plessis	Queens Sports Club, Bulawayo	South Africa by 7 wickets

=== Bangladesh in the West Indies ===
ODI series
No.	Date	Home captain	Away captain	Venue	Result
ODI 3509	20 August	Dwayne Bravo	Mushfiqur Rahim	National Cricket Stadium, St. George's, Grenada	West Indies by 3 wickets
ODI 3511	22 August	Dwayne Bravo	Mushfiqur Rahim	National Cricket Stadium, St. George's, Grenada	West Indies by 177 runs
ODI 3514	25 August	Dwayne Bravo	Mushfiqur Rahim	Warner Park, Basseterre, St. Kitts	West Indies by 91 runs
Only T20I
No.	Date	Home captain	Away captain	Venue	Result
T20I 404	27 August	Daren Sammy	Mushfiqur Rahim	Warner Park, Basseterre, St. Kitts	No result
Test series
No.	Date	Home captain	Away captain	Venue	Result
Test 2138	5–9 September	Denesh Ramdin	Mushfiqur Rahim	Arnos Vale Ground, Kingstown, St. Vincent	West Indies by 10 wickets
Test 2139	13–17 September	Denesh Ramdin	Mushfiqur Rahim	Beausejour Stadium, Gros Islet, St. Lucia	West Indies by 296 runs

=== Zimbabwe Triangular Series ===
Pos	Team	Pld	W	L	T	NR	BP	Pts	NRR
1	South Africa	4	3	1	0	0	2	14	0.404
2	Australia	4	2	2	0	0	2	10	1.160
3	Zimbabwe	4	1	3	0	0	0	4	−1.563

Group stage
No.	Date	Team 1	Captain 1	Team 2	Captain 2	Venue	Result
ODI 3513	25 August	Zimbabwe	Elton Chigumbura	Australia	George Bailey	Harare Sports Club, Harare	Australia by 198 runs
ODI 3516	27 August	Australia	George Bailey	South Africa	AB de Villiers	Harare Sports Club, Harare	South Africa by 7 wickets
ODI 3518	29 August	Zimbabwe	Elton Chigumbura	South Africa	Hashim Amla	Harare Sports Club, Harare	South Africa by 61 runs
ODI 3521	31 August	Zimbabwe	Elton Chigumbura	Australia	Michael Clarke	Harare Sports Club, Harare	Zimbabwe by 3 wickets
ODI 3522	2 September	Australia	George Bailey	South Africa	AB de Villiers	Harare Sports Club, Harare	Australia by 62 runs
ODI 3524	4 September	Zimbabwe	Elton Chigumbura	South Africa	AB de Villiers	Harare Sports Club, Harare	South Africa by 63 runs
Final
ODI 3526	6 September	Australia	George Bailey	South Africa	AB de Villiers	Harare Sports Club, Harare	South Africa by 6 wickets

== September ==
=== South African women in England ===
WT20I Series
No.	Date	Home captain	Away captain	Venue	Result
WT20I 276	1 September	Charlotte Edwards	Mignon du Preez	County Cricket Ground, Chelmsford	England by 9 wickets
WT20I 278	3 September	Charlotte Edwards	Mignon du Preez	County Ground, Northampton	England by 42 runs
WT20I 280	7 September	Charlotte Edwards	Mignon du Preez	Edgbaston, Birmingham	England by 8 runs

=== Scotland in Ireland ===
ODI Series
No.	Date	Home captain	Away captain	Venue	Result
ODI 3527	8 September	Kevin O'Brien	Preston Mommsen	The Village, Malahide	Ireland by 7 wickets
ODI 3528	10 September	Kevin O'Brien	Preston Mommsen	The Village, Malahide	Ireland by 3 wickets
ODI 3529	12 September	Kevin O'Brien	Preston Mommsen	The Village, Malahide	Scotland by 8 wickets

=== South African women against Ireland in England ===
During the same England tour in 2014, South African women's team has played 3 T20I against Ireland in the English city Solihull.

WT20I Series
No.	Date	Home captain	Away captain	Venue	Result
WT20I 281	9 September	Clare Shillington	Dane van Niekerk	Scorers, Shirley	South Africa by 56 runs
WT20I 282	9 September	Isobel Joyce	Mignon du Preez	Scorers, Shirley	South Africa by 46 runs
WT20I 283	10 September	Isobel Joyce	Mignon du Preez	Scorers, Shirley	South Africa by 6 wickets

=== New Zealand women in West Indies ===
WODI Series
No.	Date	Home captain	Away captain	Venue	Result
WODI 919	12 September	Merissa Aguilleira	Suzie Bates	Warner Park Sporting Complex, Basseterre	West Indies by 5 wickets
WODI 920	14 September	Merissa Aguilleira	Suzie Bates	Warner Park Sporting Complex, Basseterre	West Indies by 65 runs
WODI 921	17 September	Merissa Aguilleira	Suzie Bates	Warner Park Sporting Complex, Basseterre	West Indies by 8 wickets
WODI 922	19 September	Merissa Aguilleira	Suzie Bates	Warner Park Sporting Complex, Basseterre	West Indies by 4 runs
WT20I Series
No.	Date	Home captain	Away captain	Venue	Result
WT20I 284	23 September	Merissa Aguilleira	Suzie Bates	Arnos Vale Ground, Kingstown	West Indies by 7 wickets
WT20I 285	25 September	Merissa Aguilleira	Suzie Bates	Arnos Vale Ground, Kingstown	New Zealand by 7 wickets
WT20I 286	27 September	Merissa Aguilleira	Suzie Bates	Arnos Vale Ground, Kingstown	Match tied (New Zealand won S/O)

=== 2014 Asian Games ===
==== First round ====
Pos	Team	Pld	W	L	T	NR	Pts	NRR	Qualification
1	Malaysia	2	2	0	0	0	4	3.065	Quarterfinals
2	South Korea	2	1	1	0	0	2	−1.753	Quarterfinals
3	China	2	0	2	0	0	0	−3.084	

Source: ACC

Pos	Team	Pld	W	L	T	NR	Pts	NRR	Qualification
1	Nepal	2	2	0	0	0	4	2.544	Quarterfinals
2	Kuwait	2	0	1	0	1	2	−6.412	Quarterfinals
3	Maldives	2	0	1	0	1	0	−1.117	

Source: ACC

Group stage
No.	Date	Group	Team 1	Captain 1	Team 2	Captain 2	Venue	Result
1st Match	27 September	A	South Korea	Kyungsik Kim	Malaysia	Ahmed Faiz	Yeonhui Cricket Ground, Incheon	Malaysia by 8 wickets
2nd Match	27 September	B	Kuwait	Mahmood Bastaki	Nepal	Paras Khadka	Yeonhui Cricket Ground, Incheon	Nepal by 9 wickets
3rd Match	28 September	A	China	Jiang Shuyao	Malaysia	Ahmed Faiz	Yeonhui Cricket Ground, Incheon	Malaysia by 9 wickets
4th Match	28 September	B	Maldives	Ahmed Faiz	Nepal	Paras Khadka	Yeonhui Cricket Ground, Incheon	Nepal by 7 wickets
5th Match	29 September	B	Kuwait	Mahmood Bastaki	Maldives	Ahmed Faiz	Yeonhui Cricket Ground, Incheon	Kuwait by cointoss
6th Match	29 September	A	South Korea	Kyungsik Kim	China	Jiang Shuyao	Yeonhui Cricket Ground, Incheon	South Korea by 7 runs

==== Knockout stage ====
Knockout stage
No.	Date	Team 1	Captain 1	Team 2	Captain 2	Venue	Result
Quarter-finals
1st Quarterfinal	30 September	Hong Kong	Jamie Atkinson	Malaysia	Ahmed Faiz	Yeonhui Cricket Ground, Incheon	Hong Kong by 7 wickets
2nd Quarterfinal	30 September	Sri Lanka	Lahiru Thirimanne	South Korea	Kyungsik Kim	Yeonhui Cricket Ground, Incheon	Sri Lanka by 117 runs
3rd Quarterfinal	1 October	Afghanistan	Mohammad Nabi	Nepal	Paras Khadka	Yeonhui Cricket Ground, Incheon	Afghanistan by 8 runs
4th Quarterfinal	1 October	Bangladesh	Mashrafe Mortaza	Kuwait	Mahmood Bastaki	Yeonhui Cricket Ground, Incheon	Bangladesh by 203 runs
Semi-finals
1st Semifinal	2 October	Hong Kong	Jamie Atkinson	Afghanistan	Mohammad Nabi	Yeonhui Cricket Ground, Incheon	Afghanistan by 8 wickets (D/L)
2nd Semifinal	2 October	Sri Lanka	Lahiru Thirimanne	Bangladesh	Mashrafe Mortaza	Yeonhui Cricket Ground, Incheon	Sri Lanka by cointoss
Medal-Round Match
Bronze Medal	3 October	Hong Kong	Jamie Atkinson	Bangladesh	Mashrafe Mortaza	Yeonhui Cricket Ground, Incheon	Bangladesh by 27 runs
Gold Medal	3 October	Afghanistan	Mohammad Nabi	Sri Lanka	Lahiru Thirimanne	Yeonhui Cricket Ground, Incheon	Sri Lanka by 68 runs

==== Final standing ====
Rank	Team
1st place, gold medalist(s)	Sri Lanka
2nd place, silver medalist(s)	Afghanistan
3rd place, bronze medalist(s)	Bangladesh
4	Hong Kong
5	Malaysia
5	Nepal
5	South Korea
5	Kuwait
9	Maldives
9	China
