= 2024 Twenty20 East Asia Cup =

International cricket tournament

2024 East Asia Cup
- Dates: 14 – 17 February 2024
- Administrator: Hong Kong Cricket Association
- Cricket format: Twenty20 International
- Host: Hong Kong
- Champions: Hong Kong (1st title)
- Runners-up: Japan
- Participants: 3
- Matches: 7
- Most runs: (Japan) Kendel Kadowaki-Fleming (217)
- Most wickets: (Japan) Sabaorish Ravichandran (9)

The 2024 East Asia Cup was held in Hong Kong in February 2024, and was the third edition of Men's Twenty20 East Asia Cup. This was the first edition in which all of the matches had Twenty20 International (T20I) status. Japan won the previous edition in 2018. South Korea did not participate in this edition of the tournament.

Hong Kong defeated Japan in the final by 34 runs. The victory secured Hong Kong's first men's East Asia Cup title.

== Squads ==
China	Hong Kong	Japan
Wei Guo Lei (c, wk); Deng Jinqi; Xie Qiulai; Zhuang Zelin; Zou Kui; Tian Sen Qun; Qiu Yingjie; Huang Junjie (wk); Ma Qiancheng; Luo Shilin; Zhao Tianle; Zong Yuechao; Shenjian Zheng; Chen Zhuo Yue	Nizakat Khan (c); Yasim Murtaza (vc); Zeeshan Ali (wk); Haroon Arshad; Jamie Atkinson (wk); Martin Coetzee; Mohammad Ghazanfar; Babar Hayat; Ateeq Iqbal; Aizaz Khan; Anas Khan; Ehsan Khan; Jason Lui (wk); Nasrulla Rana; Dhananjay Rao; Anshuman Rath	Kendel Kadowaki-Fleming (c) (Note: Reo Sakurano-Thomas captained Japan in their fourth match of the tournament.); Koji Abe; Ryan Drake; Charles Hinze; Kazuma Kato-Stafford; Wataru Miyauchi (wk); Sabaorish Ravichandran; Reo Sakurano-Thomas; Mian Siddique; Declan Suzuki-McComb; Ibrahim Takahashi; Makoto Taniyama; Marcus Thurgate; Lachlan Yamamoto-Lake

== Round-robin ==
=== Points table ===
Pos	Team	Pld	W	L	NR	Pts	NRR	Qualification
1	Hong Kong	4	4	0	0	8	4.075	Advanced to the final
2	Japan	4	2	2	0	4	2.089	Advanced to the final
3	China	4	0	4	0	0	−6.121	

Source: ESPNcricinfo

=== Fixtures ===
14 February 2024
09:00
Scorecard

Hong Kong; 171/5 (20 overs)	v	China; 48/8 (20 overs)
Anshuman Rath 72* (46); Tian Sen Qun 3/20 (4 overs)		Huang Junjie 10 (30); Nizakat Khan 2/5 (2 overs)

Hong Kong won by 123 runs
Mission Road Ground, Mong Kok
Umpires: Shelton D'Cruz (HK) and John Prakash (HK)
Player of the match: Anshuman Rath (HK)

- Hong Kong won the toss and elected to bat.
- Dhananjay Rao (HK) and Shenjian Zheng (Chn) both made their T20I debuts.

14 February 2024
14:00
Scorecard

Japan; 179/5 (20 overs)	v	Hong Kong; 184/3 (16.1 overs)
Kendel Kadowaki-Fleming 78 (53); Aizaz Khan 2/44 (4 overs)		Jamie Atkinson 68* (36); Declan Suzuki-McComb 1/21 (3 overs)

Hong Kong won by 7 wickets
Mission Road Ground, Mong Kok
Umpires: Niaz Ali (HK) and John Prakash (HK)
Player of the match: Jamie Atkinson (HK)

- Japan won the toss and elected to bat.

15 February 2024
09:00
Scorecard

Japan; 258/0 (20 overs)	v	China; 78 (16.5 overs)
Lachlan Yamamoto-Lake 134* (68)		Wei Guo Lei 24 (23); Makoto Taniyama 3/5 (3 overs)

Japan won by 180 runs
Mission Road Ground, Mong Kok
Umpires: Jayanth Babu (HK) and Shelton D'Cruz (HK)
Player of the match: Kendel Kadowaki-Fleming (Jpn) and Lachlan Yamamoto-Lake (Jpn)

- Japan won the toss and elected to bat.
- Marcus Thurgate (Jpn) made his T20I debut.
- Lachlan Yamamoto-Lake (Jpn) scored his first century in T20Is.
- The partnership between Kendel Kadowaki-Fleming and Lachlan Yamamoto-Lake (Jpn) was the highest in men's T20Is (258).

15 February 2024
14:00
Scorecard

Hong Kong; 155 (19.4 overs)	v	Japan; 128 (18.5 overs)
Yasim Murtaza 48 (26); Sabaorish Ravichandran 5/22 (4 overs)		Ibrahim Takahashi 25 (23); Anas Khan 4/30 (4 overs)

Hong Kong won by 27 runs
Mission Road Ground, Mong Kok
Umpires: Niaz Ali (HK) and John Prakash (HK)
Player of the match: Yasim Murtaza (HK)

- Hong Kong won the toss and elected to bat.
- Sabaorish Ravichandran (Jpn) took his first five-wicket haul in T20Is.

16 February 2024
09:00
Scorecard

China; 41 (12.4 overs)	v	Hong Kong; 42/0 (5 overs)
Shenjian Zheng 21 (13); Haroon Arshad 4/7 (4 overs)		Aizaz Khan 21* (14)

Hong Kong won by 10 wickets
Mission Road Ground, Mong Kok
Umpires: Shelton D'Cruz (HK) and Shiroy Vachha (HK)
Player of the match: Haroon Arshad (HK)

- China won the toss and elected to bat.
- Jason Lui (HK) made his T20I debut.

16 February 2024
14:00
Scorecard

Japan; 143 (19.3 overs)	v	China; 99/8 (20 overs)
Wataru Miyauchi 31 (24); Tian Sen Qun 4/12 (4 overs)		Deng Jinqi 38 (49); Mian Siddique 2/17 (3 overs)

Japan won by 44 runs
Mission Road Ground, Mong Kok
Umpires: Shelton D'Cruz (HK) and John Prakash (HK)
Player of the match: Mian Siddique (Jpn)

- Japan won the toss and elected to bat.

== Final ==
17 February 2024
09:00
Scorecard

Hong Kong; 219/7 (20 overs)	v	Japan; 185/8 (20 overs)
Nizakat Khan 81 (48); Reo Sakurano-Thomas 3/40 (4 overs)		Declan Suzuki-McComb 37 (28); Yasim Murtaza 3/25 (4 overs)

Hong Kong won by 34 runs
Mission Road Ground, Mong Kok
Umpires: Shelton D'Cruz (HK) and John Prakash (HK)
Player of the match: Nizakat Khan (HK)

- Japan won the toss and elected to field.
- Hong Kong's innings total of 219 was their highest in men's T20Is.

== Exhibition match ==
17 February 2024
14:00
Scorecard

Hong Kong Dragons; 92 (18.2 overs)	v	China; 93/5 (9.4 overs)
Bobby Chan 20 (25); Zong Yuechao 2/7 (3 overs)		Wei Guo Lei 35 (26); Anthony Lau 2/20 (2.4 overs)

China won by 5 wickets
Mission Road Ground, Mong Kok
Umpires: Royce McDonald (HK) and Hemant Tukrul (HK)
Player of the match: Wei Guo Lei (Chn)

- China won the toss and elected to field.
