= 2024 Women's Twenty20 East Asia Cup =

International cricket tournament

- Dates: 8 – 13 October 2024
- Administrator: Korea Cricket Association
- Cricket format: Twenty20 International
- Tournament format(s): Round-robin and final
- Host: South Korea
- Champions: Hong Kong (4th title)
- Runners-up: Japan
- Participants: 5
- Matches: 12
- Player of the series: (China) Mengting Liu
- Most runs: (Hong Kong) Mariko Hill (181)
- Most wickets: (China) Mengting Liu (15)

The 2024 Women's Twenty20 East Asia Cup was the sixth edition of the Women's Twenty20 East Asia Cup, a Twenty20 International (T20I) cricket tournament, which was held in South Korea from 8 to 13 October 2024. The matches were played at the Yeonhui Cricket Ground in Incheon. Hong Kong were the defending champions, having defeated China in the 2023 final.

Hong Kong retained the title after defeating Japan by 10 wickets in the final. China's Mengting Liu was named player of the tournament. China won the 3rd-place playoff against South Korea, also by 10 wickets.

== Squads ==
China	Hong Kong	Japan	Mongolia	South Korea
Xu Qian (c); Wei Haiting; Wang Huiying; Jiaping Li; Mengting Liu (wk); Zi Mei; Ma Ruike; Yang Shen; Hong Yali; Jing Yang; Zhang Yibing; Gong Yuting; Cai Yuzhi; Yan Zuying	Natasha Miles (c); Maryam Bibi (vc); Fatima Amir; Betty Chan; Hiu Ying Cheung (wk); Yasmin Daswani; Mariko Hill; Joyleen Kaur (wk); Emma Lai; Kaur Mahekdeep; Iqra Sahar; Shanzeen Shahzad (wk); Alison Siu; Ruchitha Venkatesh	Mai Yanagida (c); Ahilya Chandel; Kiyo Fujikawa; Hinase Goto; Haruna Iwasaki; Shimako Kato; Elena Kusuda-Nairn; Rino Morita; Akari Nishimura (wk); Erika Oda; Kurumi Ota; Seika Sumi; Erika Toguchi-Quinn; Nonoha Yasumoto	Odzaya Erdenebaatar (c); Oyunsuvd Amarjargal; Gansuk Anujin (wk); Tsendsuren Ariuntsetseg; Myagmarzaya Batnasan; Nomundari Battulga; Uugansuvd Bayarjavkhlan; Mendbayaar Enkhzul; Urjindulam Ganbold; Batjargal Ichinkhorloo; Enkhbold Khaliunaa; Battsetseg Namuunzul; Javzandulam Tugsjargal	Seungmin Song (c); Seri Chang; Park Hyejin; Jang Jin; Sinae Kim (wk); Su Jin Kim; Halim Kwon; Hee Jung Lee; Jeon Myeong; Jiyeon Park; Jiyeon Park Jr; Lee Ra; Kang Ram; Kim Rang; Han Won

== Round-robin ==
=== Points table ===
Pos	Team	Pld	W	L	T	NR	Pts	NRR
1	Hong Kong	4	4	0	0	0	8	3.319
2	Japan	4	3	1	0	0	6	1.797
3	China	4	2	2	0	0	4	0.342
4	South Korea	4	1	3	0	0	2	−2.301
5	Mongolia	4	0	4	0	0	0	−3.712

Source: ESPNcricinfo

=== Fixtures ===
8 October 2024
10:00
Scorecard

Hong Kong; 119/4 (20 overs)	v	Japan; 75/5 (20 overs)
Shanzeen Shahzad 48 (39); Mai Yanagida 1/17 (4 overs)		Hinase Goto 23 (50); Alison Siu 2/16 (4 overs)

Hong Kong won by 44 runs
Yeonhui Cricket Ground, Incheon
Umpires: Shahid Gill (Kor) and Raja Shoaib (Kor)
Player of the match: Shanzeen Shahzad (HKG)

- Japan won the toss and elected to field.
- Kaur Mahekdeep (HK) made her T20I debut.

8 October 2024
14:00
Scorecard

Mongolia; 51 (17.4 overs)	v	China; 52/5 (9.1 overs)
Uugansuvd Bayarjavkhlan 12 (20); Liu Mengting 3/7 (4 overs)		Yang Jing 17 (17); Odzaya Erdenebaatar 3/21 (4 overs)

China won by 5 wickets
Yeonhui Cricket Ground, Incheon
Umpires: Shahid Gill (Kor) and Raja Shoaib (Kor)

- China won the toss and elected to field.
- Wei Haiting, Wang Huiying, Ma Ruike, Yang Shen, Cai Yuzhi, Yan Zuying (Chn), Myagmarzaya Batnasan, Uugansuvd Bayarjavkhlan and Javzandulam Tugsjargal (Mgl) all made their T20I debuts.

9 October 2024
10:00
Scorecard

South Korea; 145/4 (20 overs)	v	Mongolia; 112/3 (20 overs)
Seungmin Song 53 (56); Oyunsuvd Amarjargal 1/18 (3 overs)		Batjargal Ichinkhorloo 32* (54); Seri Chang 2/14 (4 overs)

South Korea won by 33 runs
Yeonhui Cricket Ground, Incheon
Umpires: Shahid Gill (Kor) and Raja Shoaib (Kor)
Player of the match: Seungmin Song (Kor)

- Mongolia won the toss and elected to field.
- Jeon Myeong, Kim Rang and Han Won (Kor) all made their T20I debuts.

9 October 2024
14:00
Scorecard

Hong Kong; 124/5 (20 overs)	v	China; 71/3 (20 overs)
Mariko Hill 41 (42); Wang Huiying 2/25 (4 overs)		Jing Yang 19 (22); Joyleen Kaur 3/11 (4 overs)

Hong Kong won by 53 runs
Yeonhui Cricket Ground, Incheon
Umpires: Shahid Gill (Kor) and Raja Shoaib (Kor)
Player of the match: Mariko Hill (HK)

- Hong Kong won the toss and elected to bat.
- Gong Yuting (Chn) and Fatima Amir (HK) both made their T20I debuts.

10 October 2024
10:00
Scorecard

Mongolia; 33 (17.1 overs)	v	Hong Kong; 35/1 (5.1 overs)
Batjargal Ichinkhorloo 13 (45); Betty Chan 3/2 (4 overs)		Emma Lai 20* (19); Odzaya Erdenebaatar 1/12 (2.1 overs)

Hong Kong won by 9 wickets
Yeonhui Cricket Ground, Incheon
Umpires: Shahid Gill (Kor) and Raja Shoaib (Kor)
Player of the match: Betty Chan (HK)

- Mongolia won the toss and elected to bat.

10 October 2024
14:00
Scorecard

South Korea; 32 (15.3 overs)	v	Japan; 36/1 (5.1 overs)
Seungmin Song 14 (31); Mai Yanagida 3/4 (2.3 overs)		Ahilya Chandel 11* (20); Seri Chang 1/24 (2.1 overs)

Japan won by 9 wickets
Yeonhui Cricket Ground, Incheon
Umpires: Shahid Gill (Kor) and Raja Shoaib (Kor)
Player of the match: Erika Toguchi-Quinn (Jpn)

- South Korea won the toss and elected to bat.
- Jang Jin (Kor) made her T20I debut.

11 October 2024
10:00
Scorecard

China; 115/4 (20 overs)	v	South Korea; 65 (19.2 overs)
Zi Mei 43* (55); Kim Rang 2/30 (4 overs)		Seungmin Song 10 (17); Mengting Liu 3/11 (4 overs)

China won by 50 runs
Yeonhui Cricket Ground, Incheon
Umpires: Shahid Gill (Kor) and Raja Shoaib (Kor)
Player of the match: Mengting Liu (Chn)

- China won the toss and elected to bat.

11 October 2024
14:00
Scorecard

Japan; 132/6 (20 overs)	v	Mongolia; 43/9 (20 overs)
Seika Sumi 26* (33); Tsendsuren Ariuntsetseg 2/10 (4 overs)		Enkhbold Khaliunaa 10 (22); Mai Yanagida 3/5 (4 overs)

Japan won by 89 runs
Yeonhui Cricket Ground, Incheon
Umpires: Shahid Gill (Kor) and Raja Shoaib (Kor)
Player of the match: Mai Yanagida (Jpn)

- Japan won the ross and elected to bat.

12 October 2024
10:00
Scorecard

Japan; 90/9 (20 overs)	v	China; 71/8 (20 overs)
Mai Yanagida 51* (60); Mengting Liu 4/3 (4 overs)		Zi Mei 16 (54); Nonoha Yasumoto 2/9 (4 overs)

Japan won by 19 runs
Yeonhui Cricket Ground, Incheon
Umpires: Shahid Gill (Kor) and Raja Shoaib (Kor)
Player of the match: Mengting Liu (Chn)

- Japan won the toss and elected to bat.
- Zhang Yibing (Chn) made her T20I debut.

12 October 2024
14:00
Scorecard

Hong Kong; 146/2 (20 overs)	v	South Korea; 76/7 (20 overs)
Mariko Hill 60* (54); Jeon Myeong 1/18 (2 overs)		Seungmin Song 21 (33); Alison Siu 4/11 (3 overs)

Hong Kong won by 70 runs
Yeonhui Cricket Ground, Incheon
Umpires: Shahid Gill (Kor) and Raja Shoaib (Kor)
Player of the match: Alison Siu (HK)

- Hong Kong won the toss and elected to bat.
- Lee Ra (Kor) made her T20I debut.

== 3rd place play-off ==
13 October 2024
10:00
Scorecard

South Korea; 40 (15.4 overs)	v	China; 43/0 (9.1 overs)
Seri Chang 8 (24); Mengting Liu 4/1 (3.4 overs)		Zi Mei 14* (32)

China won by 10 wickets
Yeonhui Cricket Ground, Incheon
Umpires: Shahid Gill (Kor) and Raja Shoaib (Kor)
Player of the match: Mengting Liu (Chn)

- South Korea won the toss and elected to bat.

== Final ==
13 October 2024
14:00
Scorecard

Japan; 108/6 (20 overs)	v	Hong Kong; 111/0 (16.4 overs)
Haruna Iwasaki 22 (15); Fatima Amir 1/9 (3 overs)		Mariko Hill 48* (53)

Hong Kong won by 10 wickets
Yeonhui Cricket Ground, Incheon
Umpires: Shahid Gill (Kor) and Raja Shoaib (Kor)
Player of the match: Mariko Hill (HK)

- Japan won the toss and elected to bat.
