= 2018 Twenty20 East Asia Cup =

2018 East Asia Cup
- Dates: 13 – 15 September 2018
- Administrator: Hong Kong Cricket Association
- Cricket format: Twenty20
- Host: Hong Kong
- Champions: Japan (1st title)
- Runners-up: Hong Kong Dragons
- Participants: 4
- Matches: 7
- Player of the series: (Hong Kong) Jason Lui
- Most runs: (Hong Kong) Jason Lui (207)
- Most wickets: (Hong Kong) Henry Siu (8)

The 2018 East Asia Cup was a Twenty20 (T20) cricket tournament, which was held in Hong Kong in September 2018. Matches were played at the Mission Road Ground in Mong Kok and the Hong Kong Cricket Club in Wong Nai, where a round-robin series was followed by a final. Kowloon Cricket Club was originally scheduled to host the final and a third-place play-off on 16 September, but the final was moved to the previous and played at the Mission Road Ground (and the third-place match cancelled) due to the expected arrival of Typhoon Mangkhut.

The Twenty20 East Asia Cup is an annual competition featuring China, Hong Kong, Japan and South Korea that was first played in 2015 and alternates annually between a men's and women's event. The women's event was won by China in 2015 and by Hong Kong in 2017. South Korea won the inaugural men's edition in 2016. Hong Kong were represented by the Hong Kong Dragons side, a team representing Hong Kong's Chinese community in both the 2016 and 2018 men's events. Matches did not have Twenty20 International status.

Japan defeated the Hong Kong Dragons in the final on 15 September 2018 to win the East Asia Cup for the first time.

== Squads ==
China	Hong Kong Dragons	Japan	South Korea
Jiang Shu Yao (c); Zhai Dian Da; Zhang Yu Fei; Pei Yun Feng; Shi Yu Feng; Huang Junjie; Wei Guo Lei; Chen Liang; Jiang Lu Long; Tian Sen Qun; Hou Rui; Tian Suqing; Chen Zhuo Yue; Song Yulin	Li Kai Ming (c); Bobby Chan; Vans Chan; Arthur Chu; David Fang; Danny Lee; Rob Lee; Jason Lui; Ka-U Lynn; Henry Siu; Nigel Sun; Ken Tsang; Siegfried Wai; Damien Yee	Masaomi Kobayashi (c); Raheel Kano; Shogo Kimura; Rui Matsumura; Naotsune Miyaji; Wataru Miyauchi; Tomoki Ota; Mian Siddique; Tsuyoshi Takada; Kazumasa Takahashi; Makoto Taniyama; Souta Wada; Kohei Wakita; Jun Yamashita	Jun Hyunwoo (c); Kim Daeyeon; AN Hyobeom; Lim Jeongwook; Choi Jiwon; Lee Jungwan; Lee Junha; Park Keunyeol; Khan Nasir; Sung Dae Sik; Park Taekwan; Khan Muhammad Umair; Kim Yongtae

== Round-robin ==
=== Points table ===
Team	P	W	L	T	NR	Pts	NRR	Status
Japan	3	3	0	0	0	6	+2.717	Advanced to the final
Hong Kong Dragons (H)	3	1	2	0	0	2	–0.653	Advanced to the final
China	3	1	2	0	0	2	–1.126	
South Korea	3	1	2	0	0	2	–1.177	

=== Matches ===
13 September 2018
Scorecard

China; 67/4 (16 overs)	v	South Korea; 72/1 (8.4 overs)
Chen Liang 17 (21); Khan Muhammad Umair 1/3 (1 over)		Kim Daeyeon 47* (34)

South Korea won by 9 wickets
Mission Road Ground, Mong Kok
Umpires: Tauseef Bukhari (HK) and Ian Thomson (HK)
Player of the match: Kim Daeyeon (Kor)

- China won the toss and elected to bat.
- The match was reduced to 16 overs per side.

13 September 2018
Scorecard

Japan; 155/8 (20 overs)	v	Hong Kong Dragons; 106 (19.3 overs)
Masaomi Kobayashi 52 (23); Ka-U Lynn 3/37 (4 overs)		Jason Lui 50 (39); Kazumasa Takahashi 3/2 (2 overs)

Japan won by 49 runs
Mission Road Ground, Mong Kok
Umpires: Niaz Ali (HK) and Ian Thomson (HK)
Player of the match: Masaomi Kobayashi (Jpn)

- Japan won the toss and elected to bat.

14 September 2018
Scorecard

Japan; 158/6 (20 overs)	v	South Korea; 74 (12.5 overs)
Makoto Taniyama 58 (46); Kim Daeyeon 3/23 (4 overs)		Park Keunyeol 21 (26); Tsuyoshi Takada 2/7 (2.5 overs)

Japan won by 84 runs
Hong Kong Cricket Club, Wong Nai
Umpires: Niaz Ali (HK) and Tauseef Bukhari (HK)
Player of the match: Makoto Taniyama (Jpn)

- South Korea won the toss and elected to field.

14 September 2018
Scorecard

Hong Kong Dragons; 107/9 (20 overs)	v	China; 112/6 (18.1 overs)
Jason Lui 54 (53); Tian Sen Qun 4/8 (2 overs)		Tian Suqing 45* (50); Henry Siu 2/15 (4 overs)

China won by 4 wickets
Hong Kong Cricket Club, Wong Nai
Umpires: Tauseef Bukhari (HK) and Ramasamy Venkatesh (HK)
Player of the match: Tian Suqing (Chn)

- Hong Kong Dragons won the toss and elected to bat.

15 September 2018
Scorecard

China; 103/6 (20 overs)	v	Japan; 107/3 (16.3 overs)
Zhang Yu Fei 56 (23); Rui Matsumura 4/9 (4 overs)		Naotsune Miyaji 28 (39); Hou Rui 1/12 (1 over)

Japan won by 7 wickets
Mission Road Ground, Mong Kok
Umpires: Tauseef Bukhari (HK) and John Prakash (HK)
Player of the match: Rui Matsumura (Jpn)

- China won the toss and elected to bat.

15 September 2018
Scorecard

South Korea; 146/9 (20 overs)	v	Hong Kong Dragons; 147/4 (15.5 overs)
Park Keunyeol 51 (49); Ka-U Lynn 2/12 (3 overs)		Jason Lui 84* (36); Kim Daeyeon 2/32 (3 overs)

Hong Kong Dragons won by 6 wickets
Mission Road Ground, Mong Kok
Umpires: Tauseef Bukhari (HK) and Ramasamy Venkatesh (HK)
Player of the match: Jason Lui (Hong Kong Dragons)

- South Korea won the toss and elected to bat.

== Final ==
15 September 2018
Scorecard

Japan; 160 (19.4 overs)	v	Hong Kong Dragons; 74 (18.1 overs)
Tomoki Ota 49 (34); Henry Siu 4/29 (4 overs)		Jason Lui 19 (18); Tsuyoshi Takada 4/13 (4 overs)

Japan won by 86 runs
Mission Road Ground, Mong Kok
Umpires: John Prakash (HK) and Ramasamy Venkatesh (HK)
Player of the match: Tsuyoshi Takada (Jpn)

- Japan won the toss and elected to bat.
