= Mongolia women's national cricket team =

Cricket team of Mongolia

Mongolia
- Flag of Mongolia
- Association: Mongolia Cricket Association

Personnel
- Captain: Uugansuvd Bayarjavkhlan
- Coach: Joseph Bull

International Cricket Council
- ICC status: Associate member (2021)
- ICC region: Asia
ICC Rankings	Current	Best-ever
T20I	69th	62nd (1 May 2024)

T20 Internationals
- First T20I: Indonesia at Zhejiang University of Technology Cricket Field, Hangzhou; 19 September 2023
- Last T20I: Myanmar at UKM-YSD Cricket Oval, Bangi; 9 June 2026
T20Is	Played	Won/Lost
Total	28	1/27 (0 ties, 0 no results)
This year	4	1/3 (0 ties, 0 no results)
- As of 9 June 2026

The Mongolia women's national cricket team represents Mongolia in international women's cricket. In July 2021, when the International Cricket Council (ICC) inducted the team as an Associate Member, it became the 22nd ICC member in the Asia region.

Mongolia played their first WT20I on 19 September 2023, against Indonesia, during the 2022 Asian Games.

== Women Twenty20 East Asia Cup ==
Women Twenty20 East Asia Cup record
Year	Round	Position	GP	W	L	T	NR
(Japan) 2015	Did not participate						
(Hong Kong) 2017	Did not participate						
(South Korea) 2019	Did not participate						
(Japan) 2022	Did not participate						
(China) 2023	Did not participate						
(South Korea) 2024	Round-robin	5/5	4	0	4	0	0
Total	1/6		4	0	4	0	0

== Records and statistics ==
International Match Summary — Mongolia Women

Last updated 9 June 2026

Playing Record
Format	M	W	L	T	NR	Inaugural Match
Twenty20 Internationals	28	1	27	0	0	19 September 2023

=== Twenty20 International ===
T20I record versus other nations

Records complete to WT20I #2833. Last updated 9 June 2026.

Opponent	M	W	L	T	NR	First match	First win
ICC Associate members
Bahrain	1	1	0	0	0	6 June 2026	6 June 2026
China	5	0	5	0	0	8 October 2024	
Hong Kong	5	0	5	0	0	20 September 2023	
Indonesia	7	0	7	0	0	19 September 2023	
Japan	2	0	2	0	0	11 October 2024	
Myanmar	4	0	4	0	0	8 November 2024	
Philippines	2	0	2	0	0	6 June 2025	
South Korea	1	0	1	0	0	9 October 2024	
Thailand	1	0	1	0	0	3 June 2026	

== See also ==
- List of Mongolia women Twenty20 International cricketers
