= Cricket at the 2014 Asian Games – Men's tournament =

International cricket tournament

Men at the 2014 Asian Games
- Venue: Yeonhui Cricket Ground
- Date: 27 September – 3 October 2014
- Competitors: 150 from 10 nations

Medalists
gold medal	Sri Lanka
silver medal	Afghanistan
bronze medal	Bangladesh

Men's cricket at the 2014 Asian Games was held in Incheon, South Korea from 27 September to 3 October 2014. Ten men's teams took part in this tournament. Sri Lanka beat Afghanistan in the final to win the gold medal.

== Squads ==
Afghanistan	Bangladesh	China	Hong Kong
Amir Hamza; Mohammad Nasim Baras; Mohammad Nabi; Mohammad Mujtaba; Gulbadin Naib; Fazal Rahman; Samiullah Shinwari; Qaseem Khan; Fareed Ahmad; Hamid Hassan; Mohammad Shahzad; Najeeb Tarakai; Abdullah Adil; Abdullah Mazari; Karim Sadiq	Sabbir Rahman; Mashrafe Mortaza; Taskin Ahmed; Arafat Sunny; Mohammad Mithun; Shuvagata Hom; Ziaur Rahman; Tamim Iqbal; Mahmudullah; Rubel Hossain; Imrul Kayes; Shamsur Rahman; Anamul Haque; Nasir Hossain; Shakib Al Hasan	Zhang Peng; Hu Gaofeng; Li Jian; Zhang Yufei; Sun Lei; Jiang Shuyao; Qing Peng; Song Yangyang; Zhong Wenyi; Ge Yongsheng; Zhao Gaosheng; Han Minjian; Tian Haiyang; Yang Yusong; Wang Jing	Adil Mehmood; Irfan Ahmed; Mark Chapman; Li Kai Ming; Aizaz Khan; Daljeet Singh; Waqas Barkat; Nadeem Ahmed; Skhawat Ali; Jason Yuan; Roy Lamsam; Mohammad Saad; Jamie Atkinson; Nizakat Khan; Furqan Tahir
Kuwait	Malaysia	Maldives	Nepal
Mahmoud Bastaki; Yousif Al-Zaid; Abdulrahman Dashti; Mohammad Al-Otaibi; Abdullah Bastaki; Abdulrahman Al-Kandari; Fahad Bastaki; Faleh Al-Nadi; Mohammad Al-Qallaf; Tareq Beidas; Mohammad Al-Kandari; Jassim Eissa; Ali Zainal; Ali Bushahri; Ebrahim Al-Dhabyan	Ahmad Tajudin Ismail; Rakesh Madhavan; Shukri Rahim; Shafiq Sharif; Ahmad Faiz; Shahrulnizam Yusof; Pavandeep Singh; Nazril Rahman; Faruq Hakimin; Aminuddin Ramly; Suresh Navaratnam; Suharril Fetri; Suhan Alagaratnam; Anwar Arudin; Muhammad Wafiq	Shafraz Jaleel; Hassan Ibrahim; Neesham Nasir; Ahmed Afzal Faiz; Mohamed Azzam; Ismail Ali; Shafee Saeed; Mihusan Hamid; Adam Nasif Umar; Muawiyath Ghanee; Ibrahim Nashath; Ahmed Hassan; Abdulla Shahid; Mohamed Rishwan; Leem Shafeeg	Naresh Budhayer; Sharad Vesawkar; Sagar Pun; Subash Khakurel; Gyanendra Malla; Bhuvan Karki; Binod Bhandari; Basanta Regmi; Ramnaresh Giri; Pradeep Airee; Shakti Gauchan; Mehboob Alam; Sompal Kami; Jitendra Mukhiya; Paras Khadka
South Korea	Sri Lanka		
Cha In-ho; Jung You-min; Park Soo-chan; Bang Su-in; Choi Ji-won; Lee Sang-wook; Kim Kyung-sik; Cho Sung-hoon; Kim Nam-heon; An Hyo-bum; Park Tae-kwan; Kim Hong-ki; Lee Hwan-hee; Sung Dae-sik; Seo Il-hwan	Ashan Priyanjan; Jeevan Mendis; Kosala Kulasekara; Asela Gunaratne; Dinesh Chandimal; Shehan Jayasuriya; Dilhara Lokuhettige; Kithuruwan Vithanage; Upul Tharanga; Chaturanga de Silva; Lahiru Thirimanne; Alankara Asanka Silva; Ramith Rambukwella; Isuru Udana; Chathuranga Kumara		

== Results ==
All times are Korea Standard Time (UTC+09:00)

=== Group round ===
==== Group A ====
Pos	Team	Pld	W	L	T	NR	Pts	NRR	Qualification
1	Malaysia	2	2	0	0	0	4	3.065	Quarterfinals
2	South Korea	2	1	1	0	0	2	−1.753	Quarterfinals
3	China	2	0	2	0	0	0	−3.084	

Source: ACC

27 September
9:30
Scorecard

South Korea; 71/8 (20 overs)	v	Malaysia; 72/2 (11.5 overs)
Cho Sung-hoon 19 (32); Faruq Hakimin 3/13 (4 overs)		Suhan Alagaratnam 35 (32); Cha In-ho 1/8 (2 overs)

Malaysia won by 8 wickets
Yeonhui Cricket Ground, Incheon
Umpires: Riaz Chaudhry (KUW) and Liu Jingmin (CHN)

- Malaysia won the toss and elected to field.

28 September
9:30
Scorecard

China; 56/7 (20 overs)	v	Malaysia; 58/1 (9 overs)
Song Yangyang 29 (46); Faruq Hakimin 4/14 (4 overs)		Suhan Alagaratnam 32* (33); Wang Jing 1/14 (2 overs)

Malaysia won by 9 wickets
Yeonhui Cricket Ground, Incheon
Umpires: Riaz Chaudhry (KUW) and Mohammed Kamruzzaman (THA)

- China won the toss and elected to bat.

29 September
16:00
Scorecard

South Korea; 88/5 (10 overs)	v	China; 82/7 (10 overs)
Sung Dae-sik 33 (16); Zhong Wenyi 4/9 (2 overs)		Song Yangyang 18 (18); Lee Hwan-hee 2/20 (2 overs)

South Korea won by 6 runs
Yeonhui Cricket Ground, Incheon
Umpires: Ramani Batumalai (MAS) and Mohammed Kamruzzaman (THA)

- China won the toss and elected to field.
- Rain reduced the match to 10 overs per side.

==== Group B ====
Pos	Team	Pld	W	L	T	NR	Pts	NRR	Qualification
1	Nepal	2	2	0	0	0	4	2.544	Quarterfinals
2	Kuwait	2	0	1	0	1	2	−6.412	Quarterfinals
3	Maldives	2	0	1	0	1	0	−1.117	

Source: ACC

27 September
14:00
Scorecard

Kuwait; 20 (13.2 overs)	v	Nepal; 21/1 (2.5 overs)
Tareq Beidas 4 (17); Basanta Regmi 3/1 (1.2 overs)		Sagar Pun 9 (7); Mahmoud Bastaki 1/8 (1 over)

Nepal won by 9 wickets
Yeonhui Cricket Ground, Incheon
Umpires: Irfan Ghafoor (KOR) and Sarika Prasad (SIN)

- Kuwait won the toss and elected to bat.

28 September
14:00
Scorecard

Maldives; 53 (18.5 overs)	v	Nepal; 54/3 (14.2 overs)
Shafraz Jaleel 12 (26); Sagar Pun 2/8 (3 overs)		Subash Khakurel 27* (39); Hassan Ibrahim 1/10 (4 overs)

Nepal won by 7 wickets
Yeonhui Cricket Ground, Incheon
Umpires: Ramani Batumalai (MAS) and Liu Jingmin (CHN)

- Maldives won the toss and elected to bat.

29 September
9:30
Scorecard

Kuwait	v	Maldives

Match abandoned
Yeonhui Cricket Ground, Incheon
Umpires: Irfan Ghafoor (KOR) and Buddhi Pradhan (NEP)

- No toss.
- No play was possible due to rain.
- Kuwait won by spin of coin.

=== Knockout round ===
Quarterfinals
30 September
Hong Kong	130/3
Malaysia	129/7
1 October
Afghanistan	119/9
Nepal	111/7
30 September
Sri Lanka	172/8
South Korea	55
1 October
Bangladesh	224/9
Kuwait	21

Semifinals
2 October
Hong Kong	88/8
Afghanistan (D/L)	73/2
2 October
Sri Lanka	NR
Bangladesh	59/3

Final
3 October
Afghanistan	65
Sri Lanka	133
Bronze medal match
3 October
Hong Kong	135/7
Bangladesh	162/6

==== Quarterfinals ====
30 September
9:30
Scorecard

Malaysia; 129/7 (20 overs)	v	Hong Kong; 130/3 (19.4 overs)
Ahmad Faiz 45 (42); Nadeem Ahmed 3/9 (4 overs)		Nizakat Khan 63* (48); Nazril Rahman 2/23 (4 overs)

Hong Kong won by 7 wickets
Yeonhui Cricket Ground, Incheon
Umpires: Riaz Chaudhry (KUW) and Buddhi Pradhan (NEP)

- Malaysia won the toss and elected to bat.

30 September
14:00
Scorecard

Sri Lanka; 172/8 (20 overs)	v	South Korea; 55 (16.4 overs)
Dinesh Chandimal 83 (51); Park Tae-kwan 4/16 (4 overs)		Kim Kyung-sik 12 (10); Chaturanga de Silva 3/8 (2.4 overs)

Sri Lanka won by 117 runs
Yeonhui Cricket Ground, Incheon
Umpires: Liu Jingmin (CHN) and Mohammed Kamruzzaman (THA)

- South Korea won the toss and elected to field.

1 October
9:30
Scorecard

Afghanistan; 119/9 (20 overs)	v	Nepal; 111/7 (20 overs)
Mohammad Shahzad 42 (34); Shakti Gauchan 3/21 (4 overs)		Binod Bhandari 48 (40); Fareed Ahmad 4/17 (4 overs)

Afghanistan won by 8 runs
Yeonhui Cricket Ground, Incheon
Umpires: Ramani Batumalai (MAS) and Sarika Prasad (SIN)

- Nepal won the toss and elected to field.

1 October
14:00
Scorecard

Bangladesh; 224/9 (20 overs)	v	Kuwait; 21 (13 overs)
Mohammad Mithun 59 (25); Fahad Bastaki 3/48 (4 overs)		Mohammad Al-Otaibi 7 (8); Arafat Sunny 4/8 (2 overs)

Bangladesh won by 203 runs
Yeonhui Cricket Ground, Incheon
Umpires: Irfan Ghafoor (KOR) and Buddhi Pradhan (NEP)

- Kuwait won the toss and elected to field.

==== Semifinals ====
2 October
9:30
Scorecard

Hong Kong; 88/8 (20 overs)	v	Afghanistan; 73/2 (11.3 overs)
Roy Lamsam 17* (20); Karim Sadiq 2/4 (2 overs)		Mohammad Shahzad 41* (28); Nadeem Ahmed 1/8 (3 overs)

Afghanistan won by 8 wickets (D/L method)
Yeonhui Cricket Ground, Incheon
Umpires: Mohammed Kamruzzaman (THA) and Buddhi Pradhan (NEP)

- Afghanistan won the toss and elected to field.
- Afghanistan were set a revised target of 72 runs from 15 overs due to rain.

2 October
14:00
Scorecard

Bangladesh; 59/3 (11 overs)	v	Sri Lanka
Sabbir Rahman 27* (25); Dilhara Lokuhettige 2/2 (2 overs)

No result
Yeonhui Cricket Ground, Incheon
Umpires: Ramani Batumalai (MAS) and Sarika Prasad (SIN)

- Sri Lanka won the toss and elected to field.
- Rain during Bangladesh's innings prevented any further play.
- Sri Lanka won by spin of coin.

==== Bronze medal match ====
3 October
9:30
Scorecard

Bangladesh; 162/6 (20 overs)	v	Hong Kong; 135/7 (20 overs)
Shakib Al Hasan 46 (37); Nadeem Ahmed 3/36 (4 overs)		Mark Chapman 38 (31); Arafat Sunny 3/22 (4 overs)

Bangladesh won by 27 runs
Yeonhui Cricket Ground, Incheon
Umpires: Ramani Batumalai (MAS) and Riaz Chaudhry (KUW)

- Bangladesh won the toss and elected to bat.

==== Final ====
3 October
14:00
Scorecard

Sri Lanka; 133 (19.1 overs)	v	Afghanistan; 65 (17.4 overs)
Lahiru Thirimanne 57 (37); Mohammad Nabi 4/18 (3.1 overs)		Najeeb Tarakai 17 (16); Jeevan Mendis 3/13 (4 overs)

Sri Lanka won by 68 runs
Yeonhui Cricket Ground, Incheon
Umpires: Buddhi Pradhan (NEP) and Sarika Prasad (SIN)

- Sri Lanka won the toss and elected to bat.

== Final standing ==
Rank	Team	Pld	W	L	T	NR
1st place, gold medalist(s)	Sri Lanka	3	2	0	0	1
2nd place, silver medalist(s)	Afghanistan	3	2	1	0	0
3rd place, bronze medalist(s)	Bangladesh	3	2	0	0	1
4	Hong Kong	3	1	2	0	0
5	Kuwait	3	0	2	0	1
5	Malaysia	3	2	1	0	0
5	Nepal	3	2	1	0	0
5	South Korea	3	1	2	0	0
9	China	2	0	2	0	0
9	Maldives	2	0	1	0	1
