= East Asia Cup =

The East Asia Cup can refer to:

- Twenty20 East Asia Cup, a cricket tournament
- EAFF E-1 Football Championship, a football tournament
