= South Korea national cricket team =

Cricket team

South Korea
- Flag of South Korea
- Association: Korea Cricket Association

Personnel
- Captain: Balage Dilruksha

International Cricket Council
- ICC status: Associate member (2017); Affiliate member (2001)
- ICC region: East Asia-Pacific
ICC Rankings	Current	Best-ever
T20I	69th	64th (2 May 2019)

International cricket
- First international: v. Japan at Perth; 25 February 2002

T20 Internationals
- First T20I: v Indonesia at Sano International Cricket Ground, Sano; 15 October 2022
- Last T20I: v Indonesia at Yeonhui Cricket Ground, Incheon; 5 October 2026
T20Is	Played	Won/Lost
Total	28	9/19 (0 ties, 0 no results)
This year	10	7/3 (0 ties, 0 no results)
T20I first kit
T20I second kit
- As of 5 October 2026

The South Korea national cricket team is the team that represents South Korea in international cricket. It is governed by the Korea Cricket Association, which became an affiliate member of the International Cricket Council (ICC) in 2001 and an associate member in June 2017.

== History ==
South Korea's first international appearance was at the ICC East Asia–Pacific 8s tournament in Perth in 2002, where they finished fourth in a field that also included Japan, Indonesia and an Australian Indigenous team. They also competed in the 2011 East Asia-Pacific Trophy.

In 2013, Arirang TV broadcast a documentary titled Bowling for Gold as part of its Arirang Prime programme, focusing on the South Korean national cricket team in the lead-up to the 2014 Asian Games. The documentary highlighted the team's struggle to form a national side without government support, their trip to Samoa for the 2011 ICC EAP Trophy Division 2 (where they made their official international debut and won their first match), the rebuilding of the team two years later for the Asian Games, and a preparatory tour to Chandigarh, Punjab, India. During the tour they played youth teams, trained under Indian coaches, watched an IPL match at the Mohali Stadium, and met players such as Adam Gilchrist.

The team competed in the 2014 Asian Games in Incheon as the host nation, reaching the quarter-finals where they were defeated by Sri Lanka. Matches were played at the purpose-built Yeonhui Cricket Ground in Incheon.

In 2016, South Korea competed in the inaugural East Asia Cup, a four-team tournament also involving Japan, China, and the Hong Kong Dragons. Hosted by the Japan Cricket Association at the Sano International Cricket Ground, South Korea won all their group matches except the one against Japan. They went on to win the tournament by defeating Japan in the final.

In April 2018, the ICC decided to grant full Twenty20 International (T20I) status to all its members. Therefore, all Twenty20 matches played between South Korea and other ICC members after 1 January 2019 have full T20I status.

South Korea participated in Group B of the 2018–19 ICC T20 World Cup East Asia-Pacific Qualifier. This was the regional first-round qualification for the 2020 ICC T20 World Cup in Australia. They finished second behind the Philippines, who advanced to the next stage.

== Tournament history ==
=== ICC T20WC EAP Qualifier ===
- 2011: 5th
- 2018–19: 2nd

=== Asian Games ===
- 2014: 8th

=== East Asia Cup ===
- 2015: 4th
- 2016: 1st
- 2018: 4th
- 2024: Did not participate

== Records ==
International Match Summary — South Korea

Last updated 5 October 2026

Playing Record
Format	M	W	L	T	NR	Inaugural Match
Twenty20 Internationals	28	9	19	0	0	9 October 2022

=== Twenty20 International ===
T20I record versus other nations

Records complete to T20I #4161. Last updated 5 October 2026.

Opponent	M	W	L	T	NR	First match	First win
vs Associate Members
Cook Islands	1	0	1	0	0	8 May 2026	
Fiji	2	2	0	0	0	13 May 2026	13 May 2026
Indonesia	12	5	7	0	0	15 October 2022	12 July 2025
Japan	4	0	4	0	0	15 October 2022	
Papua New Guinea	1	0	1	0	0	9 May 2026	
Philippines	8	2	6	0	0	1 October 2024	9 July 2025

== See also ==
- Korea Cricket Association
- South Korea national women's cricket team
- List of South Korea Twenty20 International cricketers
- Yeonhui Cricket Ground
- East Asia-Pacific
