= List of Mongolia women Twenty20 International cricketers =

This is a list of Mongolia women Twenty20 International cricketers. A Twenty20 International is an international cricket match between two representative teams, each having Twenty20 International status, as determined by the International Cricket Council (ICC). A Twenty20 International is played under the rules of Twenty20 cricket.

This list includes all players who have played at least one T20I match for Mongolia and is arranged in the order of debut appearance. Where more than one player won their first cap in the same match, their names are initially listed alphabetically at the time of debut.

The Mongolia women's team played their first WT20I match against Indonesia on 19 September 2023 during the 2022 Asian Games.

== Key ==
General

- ‡ – Captain
- † – Wicket-keeper
- First – Year of debut
- Last – Year of latest game
- Mat – Number of matches played

Batting

- Runs – Runs scored in career
- HS – Highest score
- 50 – Number of half centuries
- Avg – Runs scored per dismissal
- * – Batter remained not out

Bowling

- Wkt – Wickets taken in career
- BBI – Best bowling in an innings
- Ave – Average runs per wicket

Fielding

- Ca – Catches taken
- St – Stumpings affected

== List of players ==
Statistics are correct as of 9 June 2026.

Mongolia women T20I cricketers
General					Batting				Bowling				Fielding		Ref
No.	Name	First	Last	Mat	Runs	HS	Avg	50	Balls	Wkt	BBI	Ave	Ca	St	Ref
1	Gansuk Anujin	2023	2026	27	53	6	2.12	0	60	1	1/29	88.00	2	0	
2	Tsendsuren Ariuntsetseg‡	2023	2024	16	63	22*	4.20	0	276	9	2/10	30.77	1	0	
3	Bat-Amgalan Bulganchimeg	2023	2024	3	2	2	0.66	0	–	–	–	–	0	0	
4	Mendbayaar Enkhzul	2023	2024	16	16	5	2.00	0	277	10	4/29	36.00	2	0	
5	Jargalsaikhan Erdenesuvd	2023	2025	16	27	5	2.25	0	246	4	1/12	72.00	0	0	
6	Batjargal Ichinkhorloo	2023	2026	28	215	32*	7.96	0	12	0	–	–	3	0	
7	Enkhbold Khaliunaa†	2023	2026	20	70	15	3.68	0	–	–	–	–	2	0	
8	Ganbat Namuunsuren	2023	2023	2	0	0	0.00	0	–	–	–	–	0	0	
9	Battsetseg Namuunzul	2023	2025	20	42	15	3.50	0	156	3	1/26	88.33	3	0	
10	Battsogt Narangerel	2023	2024	6	4	3	1.33	0	12	0	–	–	1	0	
11	Ganbold Urjindulam	2023	2026	17	13	6	0.92	0	12	0	–	–	0	0	
12	Uuganbayar Anujin	2023	2024	3	3	3	1.50	0	–	–	–	–	1	0	
13	Oyunsuvd Amarjargal	2024	2026	26	42	17	2.80	0	321	12	2/20	28.50	2	0	
14	Odzaya Erdenebaatar	2024	2025	22	99	15*	5.50	0	373	14	3/21	28.21	2	0	
15	Myagmarzaya Batnasan	2024	2025	20	121	20	7.56	0	91	6	3/21	21.50	2	0	
16	Javzandulam Tugsjargal	2024	2026	17	61	19	4.35	0	48	2	1/12	37.50	1	0	
17	Uugansuvd Bayarjavkhlan	2024	2026	20	86	16*	6.61	0	289	15	3/12	21.40	2	0	
18	Battur Unenchtseceg	2025	2026	9	6	4*	–	0	98	1	1/12	114.00	1	0	
19	Nomin-Erdene Erdenebat	2025	2026	8	70	36	8.75	0	–	–	–	–	0	0	
20	Damdinsuren Enkhtsetseg	2025	2026	4	2	2	2.00	0	24	0	–	–	0	0	
21	Sunjidmaa Phillips	2026	2026	4	3	2	0.75	35	0	–	–	–	0	0	
