= Twenty20 East Asia Cup =

International cricket tournament

- Format: Twenty20, T20I and WT20I
- First edition: 2016 (Men's); 2015 (Women's)
- Latest edition: 2024 (Men's); 2024 (Women's)
- Current champion: Men's: Hong Kong (1st title); Women's: Hong Kong (4th title)
- Most successful: Men's: Hong Kong; Japan; South Korea (1 title each); Women's: Hong Kong (4 titles)

The Twenty20 East Asia Cup is a quadrangular cricket tournament played between teams representing China, Hong Kong, Japan and South Korea. From 2015 to 2019 the tournament rotated on a year-by-year basis from either a men's or women's tournament. The first edition took place in 2015, a women's tournament in South Korea. The first men's tournament took place the following year in Japan. The 2019 women's tournament was the first to be played with full Women's Twenty20 International (WT20I) status, after the International Cricket Council (ICC) had granted T20I status to matches between all of its members.

There was no tournament in 2020, after it was cancelled due to the COVID-19 pandemic. In May 2021, the four cricket associations signed an agreement for the next four editions of the women's tournament which would become an annual event. Hong Kong were scheduled to host the 2021 edition, and Japan, China and South Korea hosting the next three editions, respectively.

The 2024 men's tournament was the first to be played with full Twenty20 International (T20I) status, after the International Cricket Council (ICC) had granted T20I status to matches between all of its members.

== Tournaments summary ==
=== Men's ===
Details	Dates	Host nation(s)	Final			
Details	Dates	Host nation(s)	Venue	Winner	Result	Runner-up
2016; Men's	3 – 6 November 2016	Japan	Sano International Cricket Ground, Sano	South Korea; 101/6 (19 overs)	South Korea won by 4 wickets Scorecard	Japan; 100/7 (20 overs)
2018; Men's	13–15 September 2018	Hong Kong	Mission Road Ground, Mong Kok	Japan; 160 (19.4 overs)	Japan won by 86 runs Scorecard	Hong Kong Dragons; 74 (18.1 overs)
2024; Men's	14–17 February 2024	Hong Kong	Mission Road Ground, Mong Kok	Hong Kong; 219/7 (20 overs)	Hong Kong won by 34 runs Scorecard	Japan; 184/8 (20 overs)

=== Women's ===
Details	Dates	Host nation(s)	Final			
Details	Dates	Host nation(s)	Venue	Winner	Result	Runner-up
2015; Women's	17–20 September 2015	South Korea	Yeonhui Cricket Ground, Incheon	China; 123/2 (20 overs)	China Women won by 38 runs Scorecard	Hong Kong; 85/4 (20 overs)
2017; Women's	21–24 September 2017	Hong Kong	Kowloon Cricket Club, Hong Kong	Hong Kong; 85/5 (16.2 overs)	Hong Kong Women won by 5 wickets (DLS method); Scorecard	Japan; 90/4 (20 overs)
2019; Women's	19–22 September 2019	South Korea	Yeonhui Cricket Ground, Incheon	China; 104/4 (20 overs)	China Women won by 14 runs Scorecard	Hong Kong; 90/9 (20 overs)
2022; Women's	27–30 October 2022	Japan	Kaizuka Cricket Ground, Kaizuka	Hong Kong	4–0 (bilateral series)	Japan
2023; Women's	25–28 May 2023	China	Pingfeng Campus Cricket Field, Hangzhou	Hong Kong; 72/9 (20 overs)	Match tied (Hong Kong won the Super Over); Scorecard	China; 72 (12 overs)
2024; Women's	8–13 October 2024	South Korea	Yeonhui Cricket Ground, Incheon	Hong Kong; 111/0 (16.4 overs)	Hong Kong Women won by 10 wickets Scorecard	Japan; 108/6 (20 overs)
