= List of China Twenty20 International cricketers =

This is a list of Chinese Twenty20 International cricketers.

In April 2018, the ICC decided to grant full Twenty20 International (T20I) status to all its members. China were awarded Associate Membership of the ICC in July 2022. Therefore, all Twenty20 matches played between China and other ICC members after 1 January 2019 will be eligible to have T20I status. China played their first matches with T20I status during the 2023 T20 World Cup Asia Qualifier B in Kuala Lumpur in July 2023.

This list comprises names of all players who have played at least one T20I match for China. It is initially arranged in the order in which each player won his first Twenty20 cap. Where more than one player won their first Twenty20 caps in the same match, their surnames are listed alphabetically.

== Key ==
General

- ‡ – Captain
- † – Wicket-keeper
- First – Year of debut
- Last – Year of latest game
- Mat – Number of matches played

Batting

- Runs – Runs scored in career
- HS – Highest score
- 50 – Half-centuries scored
- Avg – Runs scored per dismissal
- * – Batsman remained not out

Bowling

- Balls – Balls bowled in career
- Wkt – Wickets taken in career
- BBI – Best bowling in an innings
- Ave – Average runs per wicket

Fielding

- Ca – Catches taken
- St – Stumpings affected

== List of players ==
Statistics are correct as of 14 October 2026.

China T20I cricketers
General					Batting				Bowling				Fielding		Ref
No.	Name	First	Last	Mat	Runs	HS	Avg	50	Balls	Wkt	BBI	Ave	Ca	St	Ref
1	Chen Zhuo Yue	2023	2026	18	85	14	6.07	0	218	11	4/16	28.00	4	0	
2	Luo Shilin	2023	2026	13	6	3*	1.20	0	192	4	2/10	62.75	0	0	
3	Ma Qiancheng	2023	2026	18	22	7	2.00	0	296	18	5/9	19.38	1	0	
4	Tian Sen Qun	2023	2026	18	76	13*	4.47	0	323	18	4/12	21.11	0	0	
5	Wang Liuyang†	2023	2023	4	28	18	7.00	0	–	–	–	–	0	3	
6	Wang Qi‡	2023	2023	4	3	2*	1.00	0	61	4	2/18	12.00	0	0	
7	Wei Guo Lei‡	2023	2024	11	141	70	12.81	1	–	–	–	–	4	0	
8	Xie Kunkun	2023	2023	4	8	5	2.00	0	–	–	–	–	0	0	
9	Yin Chenhao	2023	2023	3	2	2	1.00	0	6	0	–	–	0	0	
10	Zhao Tianle	2023	2024	7	6	4	1.00	0	36	2	1/10	32.50	2	0	
11	Zhuang Zelin	2023	2024	11	51	33	5.10	0	–	–	–	–	7	0	
12	Deng Jinqi	2023	2026	11	77	38	8.55	0	128	6	2/12	31.50	0	0	
13	Zong Yuechao	2023	2026	15	109	29	9.08	0	138	8	2/12	23.75	5	0	
14	Zou Kui	2023	2024	7	12	10	3.00	0	12	0	–	–	1	0	
15	Huang Junjie†	2024	2024	7	51	19	7.28	0	–	–	–	–	4	0	
16	Xie Qiulai	2024	2024	1	0	0	0.00	0	–	–	–	–	0	0	
17	Shenjian Zheng	2024	2026	11	94	31	8.54	0	6	0	–	–	3	0	
18	Du Jianhao	2026	2026	7	57	32	8.14	0	–	–	–	–	2	0	
19	Du Jianyao†	2026	2026	7	46	14*	9.20	0	–	–	–	–	0	1	
20	Yang Wangjie	2026	2026	7	44	18	6.28	0	–	–	–	–	1	0	
21	Zhao Zhilong	2026	2026	4	13	8	4.33	0	–	–	–	–	3	0	
22	Qi Shuai	2026	2026	2	2	2	1.00	0	18	0	–	–	1	0	
23	Liu Qingze	2026	2026	3	13	13*	–	0	16	0	–	–	0	0	
24	Yao Junting	2026	2026	5	3	3	1.00	0	62	1	1/14	90.00	0	0	
