= Chinese Cricket Association =

Official governing body of the sport of cricket in China

- Sport: Cricket
- Jurisdiction: National
- Affiliation: International Cricket Council (ICC)
- Regional affiliation: Asia
- (China)

Chinese Cricket Association is the official governing body of the sport of cricket in China. Its current headquarters are at Beijing, China. The Chinese Cricket Association is China's representative in the International Cricket Council (ICC), of which it has been an affiliate member since 2004. It is also a member of the Asian Cricket Council. In 2017, it became an associate member of the ICC.

In 2006, the Chinese Cricket Association outlined its goals as:-

- 2015: Have 20,000 players and 2,000 coaches
- 2019: Qualify for the World Cup
- 2020: Gain Test status

The talent pool in China has been improving, and in the national cricket championships of 2011, 48 schools took part, 21 more than the previous year. Cricket's growing popularity was underlined by the fact when the north-eastern city of Daqing and the north-eastern province of Heilongjiang became the ninth province in China to take to cricket, although they were part of a snowy and wintry atmosphere, and playing cricket there was not easy. In 2015, the Chinese Women’s team played in Group B of the 2015 ICC Women's World Twenty20 Qualifier, however did not progress through to the 2016 ICC Women's World Twenty20.

The ICC reported approximately 45,000 male players and 35,000 female players in China by April 2016, and is to work with the CCA to develop long term development strategy.

== See also ==
- China men's national cricket team
- China women's national cricket team
- China national under-19 cricket team
- China women's national under-19 cricket team
- Asian Cricket Council
