= Kau Pui Lung =

Valley in Kowloon, Hong Kong

Coordinates: 22.32060°N 114.18397°E

- Area
- Interactive map of Kau Pui Lung
- Administrative Region: Hong Kong
- District: Kowloon City

Kau Pui Lung (Chinese: 靠背壟; Cantonese Yale: kaau bui lúng), formerly Kau Pui Loong or Hau Pui Loong, is a valley and area between Ma Tau Wai and To Kwa Wan, and west of Ma Tau Chung in Kowloon of Hong Kong. The area now full of schools near the junction of Kau Pui Lung Road and Tin Kwong Road‌, as well as along Farm Road, where Heep Yunn School is located.

The Kau Pui Lung Road area is the site of renovation efforts by the Kowloon City Project.

== History ==
The valley once hosted a village and a river ran to Ma Tau Kok and emptied into Kowloon Bay. The valley was mainly cultivated areas.

There was a cemetery, Hau Pui Loong Cemetery, of 19 acres (7.7 ha) in the area. Part of it was a Plague Trench (疫症墳場) for the bodies of those killed by the bubonic plague between 1894 and 1901. Established in 1913, the cemetery was finally removed in 1948.

New Asia College, one of three founding colleges of the Chinese University of Hong Kong, was located near Tin Kwong Road and Farm Road. After the college moved to Ma Liu Shui, Sha Tin, New Asia Middle School was founded at the former campus.
