= 2015 Women's Twenty20 East Asia Cup =

2015 Women's East Asia Cup
- Dates: 17 – 20 September 2015
- Administrator: Korea Cricket Association
- Cricket format: Twenty20
- Host: South Korea
- Champions: China (1st title)
- Runners-up: Hong Kong
- Participants: 4
- Matches: 8
- Most runs: (China) Sun Meng Yao (154)
- Most wickets: (China) Liu Jie (7)

The 2015 Women's East Asia Cup was a Twenty20 (T20) cricket tournament, which was held in South Korea in September 2017. The matches were all played at the Yeonhui Cricket Ground in Incheon.

The Twenty20 East Asia Cup was a new annual competition featuring China, Hong Kong, Japan and South Korea. It was planned to alternate each year between a men's and women's event. China defeated Hong Kong in the final to claim the inaugural East Asia Cup title. The matches did not have Twenty20 International status.

== Squads ==
China	Hong Kong	Japan	South Korea
Liu Jie; Wu Juan; Wang Meng; Zhao Ning; Xiang Ruan; Fengfeng Song; Sun Meng Yao; Li Yingying; Chai Yudian; Caiyun Zhou; Huang Zhuo	Kary Chan; Hiu Ying Cheung; Jenefer Davies; Mariko Hill; Annie Ho; Amanda Kwok; Emma Lai; Marina Lamplough; Sheung Lee; Shanzeen Shahzad; Yee Shan To; Ruchitha Venkatesh	Miho Kanno; Yukina Kitamoto; Etsuko Kobayashi; Shizuka Miyaji; Kokoro Nakano; Ayako Nakayama; Kaoruko Nishida; Kurumi Ota; Madoka Shiraishi; Kanae Takahashi; Aki Umetani; Eri Yamaguchi; Mai Yanagida	Mina Baek; Kim Jeong Eun; Solbi Hong; Dongha Hwang; Soonmyeong Jeon; Hyeji Jeong; Yebin Ka; Bokyung Kim; Eunjin Lee; Jina Lee; Haejin Oh; Inyeong Oh; Jiyeon Park; Semi Park; So Hyeon Park; Kim Jeong Yoon

== Round-robin ==
=== Points table ===
Team	P	W	L	T	NR	Pts	NRR	Status
China	3	3	0	0	0	6	+4.868	Advanced to the final
Hong Kong	3	2	1	0	0	4	+0.262	Advanced to the final
Japan	3	1	2	0	0	2	–1.332	Advanced to the 3rd place play-off
South Korea (H)	3	0	3	0	0	0	–4.106	Advanced to the 3rd place play-off

=== Matches ===
17 September 2015
Scorecard

South Korea; 76/7 (20 overs)	v	Japan; 77/3 (16.1 overs)
Bokyung Kim 28 (38); Ayako Nakayama 2/8 (3 overs)		Shizuka Miyaji 34* (52); Semi Park 2/16 (4 overs)

Japan Women won by 7 wickets
Yeonhui Cricket Ground, Incheon

- Japan Women won the toss and elected to field.

17 September 2015
Scorecard

China; 104/4 (20 overs)	v	Hong Kong; 41 (19.4 overs)
Huang Zhou 42* (58); Mariko Hill 3/14 (4 overs)		Ruchitha Venkatesh 11 (18); Wang Meng 3/4 (2.4 overs)

China Women won by 63 runs
Yeonhui Cricket Ground, Incheon

- China Women won the toss and elected to bat.

18 September 2015
Scorecard

China; 166/2 (20 overs)	v	South Korea; 33 (15.5 overs)
Sun Meng Yao 74* (53); Inyeong Oh 1/9 (1 over)		Kim Jeong Yoon 8 (17); Fengfeng Song 3/6 (2.5 overs)

China Women won by 133 runs
Yeonhui Cricket Ground, Incheon

- China Women won the toss and elected to bat.

18 September 2015
Scorecard

Hong Kong; 100/9 (20 overs)	v	Japan; 74 (20 overs)
Kary Chan 25 (27); Yukina Kitamoto 2/3 (1 over)		Kurumi Ota 24 (34); Yee Shan To 3/15 (4 overs)

Hong Kong Women won by 26 runs
Yeonhui Cricket Ground, Incheon

- Hong Kong Women won the toss and elected to bat.

19 September 2015
Scorecard

South Korea; 58/8 (20 overs)	v	Hong Kong; 59/0 (7.4 overs)
So Hyeon Park 15 (39); Annie Ho 3/14 (4 overs)		Kary Chan 26* (17)

Hong Kong Women won by 10 wickets
Yeonhui Cricket Ground, Incheon

- South Korea Women won the toss and elected to bat.

19 September 2015
Scorecard

Japan; 33 (15.4 overs)	v	China; 36/1 (6 overs)
Miho Kanno 5 (16); Liu Jie 4/6 (3.4 overs)		Sun Meng Yao 17 (16)

China Women won by 9 wickets
Yeonhui Cricket Ground, Incheon

- Japan Women won the toss and elected to bat.

== Play-offs ==
=== Third-place play-off ===
20 September 2015
Scorecard

Japan; 127/5 (20 overs)	v	South Korea; 88/6 (20 overs)
Kurumi Ota 23 (22); Jiyeon Park 1/14 (2 overs)		Bokyung Kim 13 (20); Yukina Kitamoto 3/12 (3 overs)

Japan Women won by 63 runs
Yeonhui Cricket Ground, Incheon

- South Korea Women won the toss and elected to field.

=== Final ===
20 September 2015
Scorecard

China; 123/2 (20 overs)	v	Hong Kong; 85/4 (20 overs)
Sun Meng Yao 61 (66); Yee Shan To 1/20 (4 overs)		Yee Shan To 11 (18); Wu Juan 1/17 (4 overs)

China Women won by 38 runs
Yeonhui Cricket Ground, Incheon

- China Women won the toss and elected to bat.
