= China national cricket team =

China
- Association: Chinese Cricket Association

Personnel
- Captain: Tian Sen Qun

International Cricket Council
- ICC status: Associate member (2017)
- ICC region: Asia
ICC Rankings	Current	Best-ever
T20I	92nd	75th (2 May 2021)

International cricket
- First international: v. Iran at Chiang Mai, Thailand; 13 January 2009

T20 Internationals
- First T20I: v Malaysia at Bayuemas Oval, Pandamaran; 26 July 2023
- Last T20I: v Malaysia at Bayuemas Oval, Pandamaran; 14 October 2026
T20Is	Played	Won/Lost
Total	18	2/16 (0 ties, 0 no results)
This year	7	0/7 (0 ties, 0 no results)
T20I home kit
T20I away kit
- As of 14 October 2026

The China national cricket team represents China in international cricket. The team is organised by the Chinese Cricket Association, which became an affiliate member of the International Cricket Council (ICC) in 2004 and an associate member in 2017. China did not make its debut in international cricket until the 2009 ACC Trophy Challenge, although the Shanghai Cricket Club had previously acted as a de facto national side, from 1866 playing Interport matches against international teams. China has since participated in several other Asian Cricket Council (ACC) tournaments, as well as at the 2010 and 2014 Asian Games cricket events. Hong Kong (a Special Administrative Region of China) and Taiwan (claimed as China's 23rd province) both field separate teams in international cricket.

In April 2018, the ICC decided to grant full Twenty20 International (T20I) status to all its members. Therefore, all Twenty20 matches played between China and other ICC members after 1 January 2019 will have the full T20I status.

== History ==
Between 1858 and 1948, the Shanghai Cricket Club, the largest club in the country, played games against many touring sides, but it was not recognised as an official national team.

Since September 2005, the Chinese Cricket Association has conducted eight coaching/umpiring training courses with assistance from the Asian Cricket Council. The sport is now played in nine cities in China, namely Beijing, Shanghai, Shenyang, Dalian, Guangzhou, Shenzhen, Chongqing, Tianjin and Jinan. More than 150 schools have been involved.

China took part in the 2009 ACC Trophy Challenge, their first appearance in a representative tournament. The Chinese lost all of their group matches, including against Iran and the Maldives where they lost by 307 and 315 runs respectively. In the seventh-place playoff, China recorded their first-ever international win when they beat Myanmar by 118 runs.

20 January 2009
scorecard

China; 181 (39.3 overs)	v	Myanmar; 63 (20.3 overs)
Li Jian 32 (43); Aye Min Than 4/54 (9.3 overs)		Aye Min Than 19 (40); Li Jian 4/16 (4.3 overs)

China won by 118 runs
Gymkhana Club, Chiang Mai
Umpires: U Kaluhetti (Thailand) and M Kamruzzaman (Thailand)
Player of the match: Li Jian (China)

- First ever International win for China

China took part in the 2014 ACC Twenty20 Cup in the United Arab Emirates. The team lost their first game against Afghanistan by 9 wickets after being bowled out for just 37. China lost all five of their group games by wide margins, including a record low total and record margin of defeat in a representative Twenty20 match when they lost to the United Arab Emirates by 209 runs after conceding 236 runs during the UAE's innings and then in reply were bowled out for 27 runs, with 15 of those runs coming in extras. They lost to Bahrain in the eleventh place playoff, thus finishing the tournament in twelfth and last place.

China participated in the 2010 Asian Games where, as host, it played against Afghanistan, Bangladesh, Oman, Pakistan, Sri Lanka and the United Arab Emirates.

China played their first T20I on 26 July 2023, against Malaysia, during the 2023 ICC Men's T20 World Cup Asia Qualifier.

26 July 2023
09:00
Scorecard

China; 23 (11.2 overs)	v	Malaysia; 24/2 (4.5 overs)
Wei Guo Lei 7 (15); Syazrul Idrus 7/8 (4 overs)		Virandeep Singh 19* (14); Wang Qi 1/5 (2 overs)

Malaysia won by 8 wickets
Bayuemas Oval, Pandamaran
Umpires: Vrinda Rathi (Ind) and Ramasamy Venkatesh (HK)
Player of the match: Syazrul Idrus (Mas)

- China won the toss and elected to bat.
- First ever T20I match for China.
- Syazrul Idrus became the first person to take 7 wickets in any men's T20 internationals

In the same tournament, China defeated Myanmar in their last match to register their first-ever win in T20Is.

31 July 2023
13:30
Scorecard

Myanmar; 77/8 (20 overs)	v	China; 78/5 (17.2 overs)
Pyae Phyo Wai 17 (25); Chen Zhuo Yue 4/16 (4 overs)		Zhuang Zelin 33 (41); Paing Danu 2/15 (4 overs)

China won by 5 wickets
Bayuemas Oval, Pandamaran
Umpires: Viswanadan Kalidas (Mas) and Vrinda Rathi (Ind)
Player of the match: Chen Zhuo Yue (Chn)

- China won the toss and elected to field.
- First ever T20I win for China.

== Grounds ==
Major current cricket grounds in China

== Current squad ==
As of 2 June 2026

Name	Age	Batting style	Bowling style	Notes
Batters
Du Jianhao	21	Left-handed	Right-arm medium	
Zhao Zhilong	20	Left-handed	Right-arm medium	
Zhuang Zelin	26	Right-handed	Right-arm off break	
Yang Wangjie	19	Right-handed	Right-arm off break	
Shenjian Zheng	21	Right-handed		
All-rounders
Chen Zhuo Yue	23	Left-handed	Slow left-arm orthodox	
Zong Yuechao	21	Left-handed	Left-arm medium fast	
Deng Jinqi	21	Right-handed	Right-arm off break	
Wicketkeeper
Du Jianyao	21	Right-handed		
Meng Jianhao	19	Right-handed		
Spin Bowlers
Luo Shilin	21	Right-handed	Right-arm leg spin	
Pace Bowlers
Tian Sen Qun	25	Right-handed	Right-arm medium-fast	Captain
Ma Qiancheng	21	Right-handed	Right-arm medium-fast	
Qi Shuai	19	Right-handed	Right-arm medium	

== Tournament history ==
=== ACC Challenger Cup ===
ACC Men's Challenger Cup record
Host/Year	Round	Position	GP	W	L	T	NR
(Thailand) 2023	Did not participate						
(Thailand) 2024	9th place play-off	9th	3	1	2	0	0
Total	2/2	0 Titles	3	1	2	0	0

=== TwentyT20 East Asia Cup ===
Twenty20 East Asia Cup record
Host/Year	Round	Position	GP	W	L	T	NR
(Japan) 2016	Round-robin	4th	4	1	3	0	0
(Hong Kong) 2018	Round-robin	3rd	3	1	2	0	0
(Hong Kong) 2024	Round-robin	3rd	3	0	3	0	0
Total	3/3	0 Titles	10	2	8	0	0

=== ACC Eastern Region T20 ===
ACC Eastern Region T20 record
Host/Year	Round	Position	GP	W	L	T	NR
(Thailand) 2018	Round-robin	4th	4	0	3	0	1
(Thailand) 2020	Did not participate						
Total	0/0	0 Titles	4	0	3	0	1

=== ACC Trophy Challenge ===
ACC Trophy Challenge record
Host/Year	Round	Position	GP	W	L	T	NR
(Thailand) 2009	7th place play-off	7th	4	1	3	0	0
(Thailand) 2010	5th place play-off	6th	4	1	3	0	0
(Oman) 2012	6th place play-off	6th	4	2	2	0	0
Total	3/9	0 Titles	12	4	8	0	0

=== ACC Twenty20 Cup ===
ACC Twenty20 Cup
Host/Year	Round	Position	GP	W	L	T	NR
(Kuwait) 2007	Did not qualify						
(United Arab Emirates) 2009	Group stages	12th	5	0	5	0	0
(Nepal) 2011	Did not qualify						
(Nepal) 2013	Did not qualify						
(United Arab Emirates) 2015	Did not qualify						
Total	1/5	0 Titles	5	0	5	0	0

=== Asian Games ===
Asian Games records
Host/Year	Round	Position	GP	W	L	T	NR
(China) 2010	Quarter-final	5th	2	0	2	0	0
(South Korea) 2014	Group stages	9th	2	0	2	0	0
(Indonesia) 2018	Did not include Cricket						
(China) 2022	Did not participate						
(Japan) 2026	To be determined						
Total	2/3	0 Titles	4	0	4	0	0

== Records ==
International Match Summary

Last updated 14 October 2026

Playing Record
Format	M	W	L	T	NR	Inaugural Match
Twenty20 Internationals	18	2	16	0	0	26 July 2023

=== Twenty20 International ===
- Highest team total: 129/4 v. Myanmar on 30 January 2024 at Terdthai Cricket Ground, Bangkok.
- Highest individual score: 70, Wei Guo Lei v. Myanmar on 30 January 2024 at Terdthai Cricket Ground, Bangkok.
- Best individual bowling figures: 5/9, Ma Qiancheng v. Myanmar on 30 January 2024 at Terdthai Cricket Ground, Bangkok.

T20I record versus other nations

Records complete to T20I #4198. Last updated 14 October 2026.

Opponent	M	W	L	T	NR	First match	First win
vs Associate Members
Bhutan	1	0	1	0	0	30 July 2023	
Cambodia	1	0	1	0	0	28 January 2024	
Hong Kong	3	0	3	0	0	14 February 2024	
Japan	2	0	2	0	0	15 February 2024	
Malaysia	3	0	3	0	0	26 July 2023	
Maldives	1	0	1	0	0	8 October 2026	
Myanmar	3	2	1	0	0	31 July 2023	31 July 2023
Nepal	1	0	1	0	0	31 May 2026	
Saudi Arabia	1	0	1	0	0	12 October 2026	
Singapore	1	0	1	0	0	11 October 2026	
Thailand	1	0	1	0	0	27 July 2023	

== See also ==
- List of China Twenty20 International cricketers
