= Shakeel Ahmed (cricketer) =

Pakistani cricketer (born 1971)

Cricket information
- Batting: Right-handed
- Bowling: Right-arm offbreak

Career statistics
Competition	Test	ODI
Matches	3	2
Runs scored	74	61
Batting average	14.80	30.50
100s/50s	0/0	0/0
Top score	33	36
Catches/stumpings	4/–	0/–
- Source: , 4 February 2006

Mohammad Shakeel Ahmed (born 12 November 1971) is a Pakistani former cricketer who played in three Test matches and two One Day Internationals from 1993 to 1995. He is currently based in Johannesburg, South Africa.

He left Pakistan and settled in Johannesburg, South Africa, where he played for Easterns cricket team in the 1998–99 winter, becoming the first Pakistani to play in South African domestic cricket.

He was a wicketkeeper-batsman.
