= List of Bahawalpur cricketers =

This is a list of cricketers who have played matches for the Bahawalpur cricket team, based in the city of Bahawalpur in Punjab, Pakistan.

== Notable players ==
- Azhar Abbas
- Agha Saadat Ali
- Shabbir Ahmed
- Shakeel Ahmed
- Zulfiqar Ahmed
- Israr Ali
- Mohammad Ali
- Sajid Ali
- Sher Ali
- Alimuddin
- Anwar Khan
- Shahid Anwar
- Imranullah Aslam
- Ataullah
- Aamer Bhatti
- Javed Bhatti
- Tauseef Bukhari
- Khalid Butt
- Iqbal Chaudhri
- Amir Elahi
- Aamer Gul
- Zulqarnain Haider
- Ijaz Hussain
- Kamran Hussain
- Murtaza Hussain
- Mohammad Imran
- Asif Iqbal
- Bilal Khilji
- Naved Latif
- Majid Majeed
- Maqsood Ahmed
- Tahir Maqsood
- Fahad Masood
- Hanif Mohammad
- Khan Mohammad
- Wazir Mohammad
- Zaeem Raja
- Azmat Rana
- Mansoor Rana
- Ali Raza
- Azhar Shafiq
- Shujauddin Butt
- Iqbal Sikander
- Mohammad Talha
- Hammad Tariq
- Usman Tariq
- Gulraiz Wali
- Mohammad Yousuf
- Mohammad Zahid
