= 2016 Twenty20 East Asia Cup =

2016 East Asia Cup
- Dates: 3 – 6 November 2016
- Administrator: Japan Cricket Association
- Cricket format: Twenty20
- Host: Japan
- Champions: South Korea (1st title)
- Runners-up: Japan
- Participants: 4
- Matches: 8
- Most runs: (Japan) Masaomi Kobayashi (111)
- Most wickets: (Japan) Kohei Wakita (10)

The 2016 East Asia Cup was a Twenty20 (T20) cricket tournament, which was held in Japan in November 2016. The matches were all played at the Sano International Cricket Ground in the city of Sano.

The Twenty20 East Asia Cup is an annual competition featuring China, Hong Kong, Japan and South Korea that was first played in 2015 and alternates annually between a men's and women's event. This was the first edition of the men's event, after China won the inaugural women's edition in 2015. Matches did not have Twenty20 International status. Hong Kong was represented by the Hong Kong Dragons side, a team representing Hong Kong's Chinese community, instead of the full national side.

South Korea defeated hosts Japan in the final on 6 November 2016 to win the East Asia Cup.

== Squads ==
China	Hong Kong Dragons	Japan	South Korea
Zhang Yu Fei (c); Lu Cangcang; Xu Hao; Dong Jiahao; Han Junhui; Qing Peng; He Shuai; Tian Suqing; Yan Hua Wen; Pu Xianliang; Song Yangyang; Feng Yu; Wang Yu; Song Yulin; Wang Zihao	Damien Yee (c); Najeeb Amar; Edwin Ang; Bobby Chan; James Chan; Louis Chan; Adrian Lee; Danny Lee; Rob Lee; Jason Lui; Anthony Marrin; Li Kai Ming; Chris Pickett; Henry Siu; Siegfried Wai; Max Yeung; Michael Zheng	Masaomi Kobayashi (c); Takuro Hagihara; Rui Matsumara; Wataru Miyauchi; Ken Okoshi; Tomoki Ota; Mian Siddique; Makoto Taniyama; Marcus Thurgate; Nozomi Tomizawa; Ryoya Tsutsui; Kohei Wakita; Shodai Yamada; Jun Yamashita	Sung Dae Sik (c); Hyobum An; Yu Hogyun; Lee Hyosin; Jun Hyunwoo; Lee Kangmin; Park Keunyeol; Unair Khan; Lim Jeongwook; Choi Jiwon; Soochan Park; Cho Yonggyun; Kim Yongtae

== Round-robin ==
=== Points table ===
Team	P	W	L	T	NR	Pts	NRR	Status
Japan (H)	3	3	0	0	0	6	+2.453	Advanced to the final
South Korea	3	2	1	0	0	4	+2.608	Advanced to the final
China	3	1	2	0	0	2	–1.594	Advanced to the 3rd place play-off
Hong Kong Dragons	3	0	3	0	0	0	–3.174	Advanced to the 3rd place play-off

=== Matches ===
3 November 2016
Scorecard

China; 80/9 (20 overs)	v	Japan; 81/5 (12.5 overs)
Zhang Yu Fei 53* (65); Kohei Wakita 3/15 (4 overs)		Masaomi Kobayashi 29* (35); Wang Zihao 2/18 (3 overs)

Japan won by 5 wickets
Sano International Cricket Ground, Sano
Umpires: Alan Curr (Jpn) and Mihindu Perera (Jpn)
Player of the match: Zhang Yu Fei (Chn)

- China won the toss and elected to bat.

3 November 2016
Scorecard

South Korea; 171/5 (20 overs)	v	Hong Kong Dragons; 75/7 (20 overs)
Choi Jiwon 45* (39); Danny Lee 2/29 (4 overs)		Siegfried Wai 11 (22); Unair Khan 3/11 (3 overs)

South Korea won by 96 runs
Sano International Cricket Ground, Sano
Umpires: Alan Curr (Jpn) and Mihindu Perera (Jpn)

- South Korea won the toss and elected to field.

4 November 2016
Scorecard

China; 76/8 (20 overs)	v	South Korea; 80/3 (11.1 overs)
Tian Suqing 20 (45); Choi Jiwon 2/6 (4 overs)		Choi Jiwon 20* (13); Wang Zihao 1/17 (3 overs)

South Korea won by 7 wickets
Sano International Cricket Ground, Sano
Umpires: Alan Curr (Jpn) and Uddika Pradeep (Jpn)
Player of the match: Choi Jiwon (Kor)

- China won the toss and elected to bat.

4 November 2016
Scorecard

Japan; 123/8 (20 overs)	v	Hong Kong Dragons; 34 (14.2 overs)
Masaomi Kobayashi 48 (54); Siegfried Wai 3/26 (4 overs)		Louis Chan 13 (22); Makoto Taniyama 3/5 (4 overs)

Japan won by 89 runs
Sano International Cricket Ground, Sano
Umpires: Mihindu Perera (Jpn) and Uddika Pradeep (Jpn)
Player of the match: Masaomi Kobayashi (Jpn)

- Japan won the toss and elected to bat.

5 November 2016
Scorecard

Hong Kong Dragons; 99/7 (20 overs)	v	China; 100/8 (19.2 overs)
Bobby Chan 19 (25); Xu Hao 4/17 (4 overs)		Yan Hua Wen 25 (26); Edwin Ang 3/7 (4 overs)

China won by 5 wickets
Sano International Cricket Ground, Sano
Umpires: Mihindu Perera (Jpn) and Seiji Sugiura (Jpn)
Player of the match: Xu Hao (Chn)

- Hong Kong Dragons won the toss and elected to bat.

5 November 2016
Scorecard

Japan; 144/7 (20 overs)	v	South Korea; 134/8 (20 overs)
Wataru Miyauchi 37 (49); Kim Yongtae 2/15 (4 overs)		Kim Yongtae 30 (17); Kohei Wakita 4/13 (4 overs)

Japan won by 10 runs
Sano International Cricket Ground, Sano
Umpires: Kris Bayne (Jpn) and Keith Franklin (Jpn)
Player of the match: Kohei Wakita (Jpn)

- Japan won the toss and elected to bat.

== Play-offs ==
=== Third-place play-off ===
6 November 2016
Scorecard

Hong Kong Dragons; 128/4 (20 overs)	v	China; 99 (19.3 overs)
Jason Lui 48* (33); Zhang Yu Fei 2/13 (4 overs)		Song Yangyang 30 (32); Henry Siu 3/23 (3.3 overs)

Hong Kong Dragons won by 29 runs
Sano International Cricket Ground, Sano
Umpires: Kris Bayne (Jpn) and Chris Thurgate (HK)
Player of the match: Jason Lui (Hong Kong Dragons)

- China won the toss and elected to field.

=== Final ===
6 November 2016
Scorecard

Japan; 100/7 (20 overs)	v	South Korea; 101/6 (19 overs)
Masaomi Kobayashi 22 (32); Jun Hyunwoo 2/13 (2 overs)		Jun Hyunwoo 26 (25); Mian Siddique 4/12 (4 overs)

South Korea won by 4 wickets
Sano International Cricket Ground, Sano
Umpires: Keith Franklin (Jpn) and Uddika Pradeep (Jpn)
Player of the match: Jun Hyunwoo (Kor)

- Japan won the toss and elected to bat.
