= Yasmin Daswani =

Hong Kong cricketer (born 1994)

Personal information
- Full name: Yasmin Daswani
- Born: 21 September 1994 (age 32); England
- Batting: Right-handed
- Bowling: Right-arm medium

International information
- National side: Hong Kong
- T20I debut (cap 4): 12 January 2019 v Indonesia
- Last T20I: 13 October 2024 v Japan

Domestic team information
- Years: Team
- 2023–present: Essex
- 2023–present: Huntingdonshire

Career statistics
Competition	WT20I
Matches	54
Runs scored	523
Batting average	15.41
100s/50s	0/0
Top score	34*
Balls bowled	–
Wickets	–
Bowling average	–
5 wickets in innings	–
10 wickets in match	–
Best bowling	–
Catches/stumpings	19/3
- Source: Cricinfo, 30 October 2024

Yasmin Daswani (born 21 September 1994) is an English-born Hong Kong women's cricketer and lawyer who represents the Hong Kong national women's national cricket team in international cricket.

In February 2022, Daswani was announced as a player in the 2022 FairBreak Invitational T20 – an ICC sanctioned competition that took place in May 2022 in Dubai in conjunction with Cricket Hong Kong.

== Early life and education ==
Daswani was born on 21 September 1994. She studied law at Durham University and following a two-year break started practicing as a solicitor at Fladgate LLP.

== Career ==
In 2010, Daswani was awarded player of the tournament at the ACC Under-19 Women's Championship 2010.

In 2017, she was awarded player of the tournament at the 2017 Women's Twenty20 East Asia Cup with figures of 77 off 64 against Korea, 71 off 68 against China and 31 off 49 against Japan

In 2023, she played for Essex in the Women's London Championship and for Huntingdonshire in the East of England Women's County Championship.

As of 24 January 2024 she holds the record for most catches in an innings in T20I Matches.

In 2026, Daswani represented Hong Kong at ACC Women's Premier Cup. She was the second-highest run-scorer at the Premier Cup, scoring 274 runs in six innings at an average of 137.00, including a career-best unbeaten 84 against Qatar, helping Hong Kong qualify for the Asa Cup.

In August 2026, Daswani was selected to represent Hong Kong at the 2026 Women's T20 Asia Cup in the United Arab Emirates, where she played against Thailand, India and Pakistan. During Hong Kong's opening match against Thailand on 28 August, she became the fourth Hong Kong women's cricketer to surpass 1,500 runs in T20 Internationals. She was also named Hong Kong's Women's International Player of the Year in 2026.
