= Miho Kanno (cricketer) =

Japanese cricketer (born 1990)

Personal information
- Born: April 16, 1990 (age 36); Gunma, Japan
- Batting: Right-handed
- Bowling: Right arm fast medium

International information
- National side: Japan
- T20I debut (cap 4): 6 May 2019 v Indonesia
- Last T20I: 22 September 2019 v South Korea

Domestic team information
- Years: Team
- Adore Cricket Club

Career statistics
Competition	WT20I
Matches	9
Runs scored	82
Batting average	10.25
100s/50s	0/0
Top score	21*
Balls bowled	150
Wickets	6
Bowling average	22.66
5 wickets in innings	0
10 wickets in match	0
Best bowling	2/14
Catches/stumpings	0/–
Medal record
Representing Japan
Women's Cricket
Asian Games
Bronze medal – third place	2010 Guangzhou	Team
- Source: Cricinfo, 6 May 2019

Miho Kanno (Kanji:菅野 美保, born 16 April 1990) is a Japanese cricketer. She was a member of the Japanese cricket team which won the bronze medal at the 2010 Asian Games. Kanno also played in the 2013 Women's World Twenty20 Qualifier with the national team.

In April 2019, she was named in Japan's squad for the 2019 ICC Women's Qualifier EAP tournament in Vanuatu. Her Women's Twenty20 International (WT20I) debut was against Indonesia in the Women's Qualifier EAP tournament on 6 May 2019.
