= Etsuko Kobayashi =

Japanese cricketer

Personal information
- Born: 10 April 1992 (age 34); Yamagata, Japan
- Batting: Right-handed
- Bowling: Right-arm medium

International information
- National side: Japan
- Source: Cricinfo, 6 January 2018

Etsuko Kobayashi (小林悦子, Kobayashi Etsuko; born 10 April 1992) is a Japanese cricketer. She played for Japanese cricket team in the 2013 Women's World Twenty20 Qualifier. She was also the part of the national team at the 2014 Asian Games.
