= Mission Road Ground =

Cricket ground in Hong Kong

- Tin Kwong Road Recreation Ground
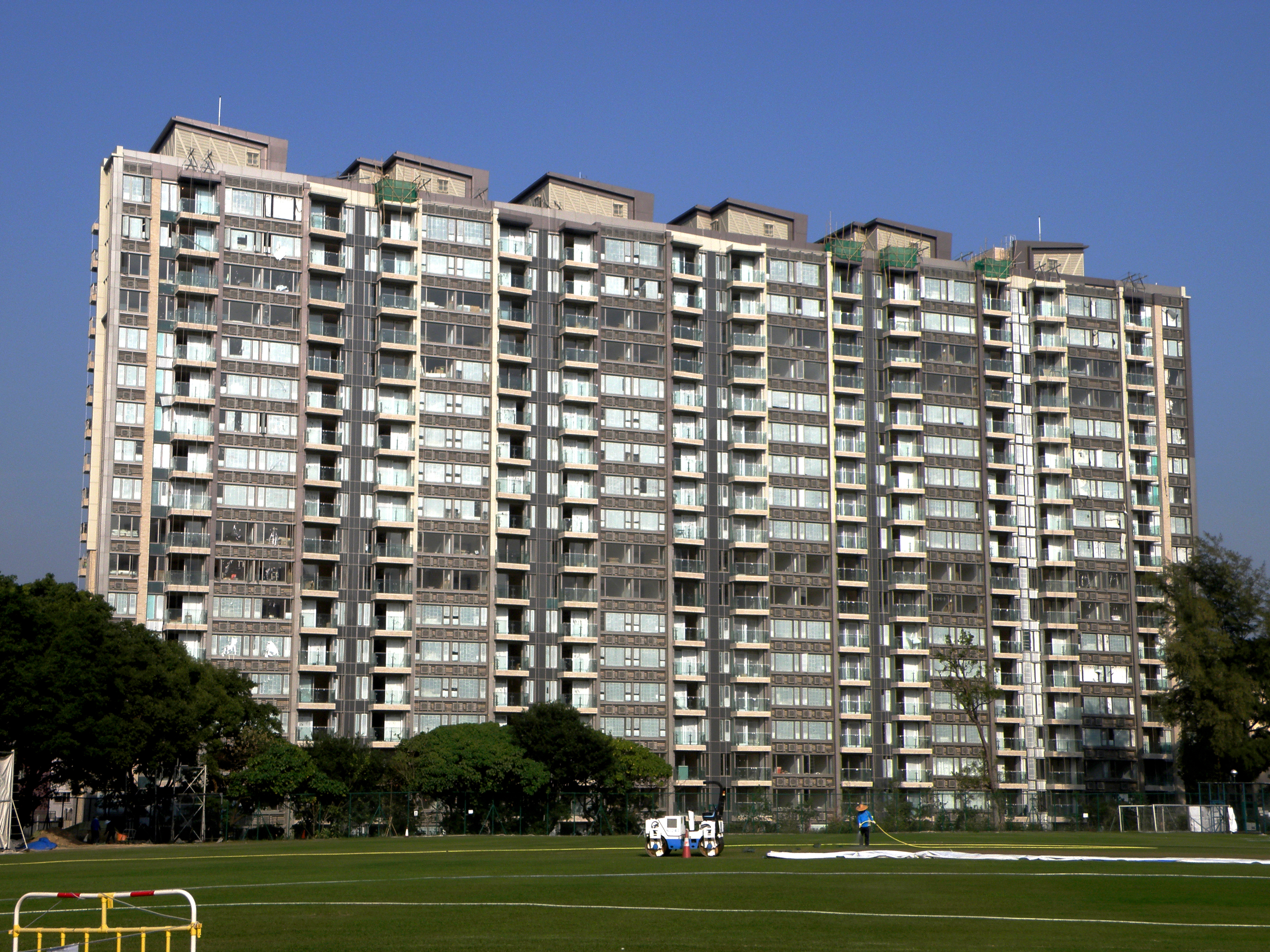
- Interactive map of Mission Road Ground

Ground information
- Location: Kau Pui Lung, Kowloon, Hong Kong
- Country: Hong Kong
- Coordinates: 22°19′23″N 114°11′6″E
- Establishment: 1976; 50 years ago
- Capacity: 3,500
- Tenants: Hong Kong national cricket team Hong Kong women's national cricket team
- End names
- n/a n/a

International information
- First men's ODI: 26 January 2016: Hong Kong v Scotland
- Last men's ODI: 8 November 2016: Hong Kong v Papua New Guinea
- First men's T20I: 30 January 2016: Hong Kong v Scotland
- Last men's T20I: 1 March 2026: Hong Kong v Kuwait
- First women's T20I: 14 June 2023: Namibia v Thailand
- Last women's T20I: 8 December 2024: Hong Kong v Thailand
- As of 1 March 2026; Source: Cricinfo

The Mission Road Ground, also known as the Tin Kwong Road Recreation Ground, is a multi-purpose sports field on Tin Kwong Road‌ in Kau Pui Lung, Kowloon, Hong Kong. The ground is mainly used for cricket matches. It was opened in 1976, and the first cricket match played there was between a Hong Kong XI and the Queensland Colts.

== History ==
In November 2015, the International Cricket Council (ICC) announced that it had approved the ground as venue for holding One Day International (ODI) matches, the venue thus became the first international cricket venue in East Asia.

On 26 January 2016, the ground hosted its first ODI when Hong Kong played against Scotland in the 2015–17 ICC World Cricket League Championship. A second scheduled ODI was washed out. On the two following days, the first two Twenty20 Internationals at the ground were played, between the same teams.

In February 2020, Interport Series was scheduled to be played at this venue but was cancelled due to the coronavirus pandemic. The series was then moved to Kinrara Academy Oval in Kuala Lumpur.

== List of international cricket five-wicket hauls ==
Bowler	Date	Team	Opposing team	Figures	Result
Chad Soper	6 November 2016	Papua New Guinea	Hong Kong	6/41	PNG won
