= Jamie Atkinson =

Hong Kong cricketer (born 1990)

Personal information
- Full name: James John Atkinson
- Born: 23 August 1990 (age 36); Hong Kong
- Batting: Right-handed
- Role: Wicket-keeper batter

International information
- National side: Hong Kong
- ODI debut (cap 14): 24 June 2008 v Pakistan
- Last ODI: 8 December 2017 v Papua New Guinea
- T20I debut (cap 2): 16 March 2014 v Nepal
- Last T20I: 9 September 2024 v Kuwait

Domestic team information
- Years: Team
- 2009–2011: Durham UCCE/MCCU
- 2013: Warwickshire

Career statistics
Competition	ODI	T20I	FC	LA
Matches	9	29	9	29
Runs scored	250	448	159	700
Batting average	27.77	19.47	11.35	26.92
100s/50s	0/1	0/3	0/0	0/4
Top score	59	68	34	85
Catches/stumpings	10/6	24/1	14/1	30/10
- Source: ESPNcricinfo, 31 July 2025

James John Atkinson (born August 1990) is an international cricketer who plays cricket for Hong Kong. He also captained the Hong Kong cricket team before stepping down in May 2015.

A wicket-keeper, Atkinson has also represented Hong Kong at the under-19 level, and was part of their squad in the 2010 U-19 Cricket World Cup. He was the first Hong Kong player (either male or female) born in the 1990s to play in ODI cricket as he made his debut at the age of 17 in 2008 against Pakistan during the 2008 Asia Cup. His father Steve played Minor Counties cricket.

Atkinson later attended Durham University. In 2014, Atkinson captained the Hong Kong team in their first global tournament, the World T20 in Bangladesh, defeating the hosts in their final match after two losses. His highest score was 31 from 20 balls against Afghanistan in Chittagong.

In May 2015, he stepped down as Hong Kong's captain citing lack of form as his main reason. The decision came after he led the side in a 59-run win over Namibia in a T20 match in which he made an unbeaten 37-ball 64. In April 2019, he was named in Hong Kong's squad for the 2019 ICC World Cricket League Division Two tournament in Namibia. In May 2022, he was named in Hong Kong's side for the 2022 Uganda Cricket World Cup Challenge League B tournament.

He is now a teacher at South Island School
