= South Korea women's national cricket team =

Cricket team

South Korea
- Flag of South Korea
- Association: Korea Cricket Association

Personnel
- Captain: Inyeong Oh

International Cricket Council
- ICC status: Associate member (2017); Affiliate member (2001)
- ICC region: East Asia-Pacific
ICC Rankings	Current	Best-ever
T20I	44th	36th (6 Feb 2019)

T20 Internationals
- First T20I: v. China at Yeonhui Cricket Ground, Incheon; 3 November 2018
- Last T20I: v. China at Yeonhui Cricket Ground, Incheon; 13 October 2024
T20Is	Played	Won/Lost
Total	12	2/10 (0 ties, 0 no results)
This year	0	0/0 (0 ties, 0 no results)
- As of 13 October 2024

The South Korea national women's cricket team represents South Korea in international women's cricket. They made their international debut in the 2014 Asian Games in South Korea in September 2014.

In 2017, the South Korean team participated in the Women's East Asia Cup in Hong Kong.

In April 2018, the International Cricket Council (ICC) granted full Women's Twenty20 International (WT20I) status to all its members. Therefore, all Twenty20 matches played between South Korea women and other ICC members after 1 July 2018 have the WT20I status.

== Tournament history ==
=== Asian Games ===
Asian Games record
Year	Round	Position	GP	W	L	T	NR
(China) 2010	Did not participate						
(South Korea) 2014	Group stages	9/9	2	0	2	0	0
(China) 2022	Did not participate						
(Japan) 2026	To be determined						
(Qatar) 2030	To be determined						
(Saudi Arabia) 2034	To be determined						
Total	1/3	–	2	0	2	0	0

=== Women Twenty20 East Asia Cup ===
Women Twenty20 East Asia Cup record
Year	Round	Position	GP	W	L	T	NR
(Japan) 2015	4th place	4/4	3	3	0	0	0
(Hong Kong) 2017	4th place	4/4	4	2	1	0	1
(South Korea) 2019	4th place	4/4	4	0	4	0	0
(Japan) 2022	Did not participate						
(South Korea) 2024	To be determined						
Total	3/4		11	5	5	0	1

== Records and statistics ==
International Match Summary — South Korea Women

Last updated 13 October 2024

Playing Record
Format	M	W	L	T	NR	Inaugural Match
Twenty20 Internationals	12	2	10	0	0	3 November 2018

=== Twenty20 International ===
- Highest team total: 117/5 (18.1 overs) v China on 4 November 2018 at Yeonhui Cricket Ground, Incheon.
- Highest individual score: 51*, Mina Baek v China on 4 November 2018 at Yeonhui Cricket Ground, Incheon.
- Best individual bowling figures: 4/17, Mina Baek v Japan on 22 September 2019 at Yeonhui Cricket Ground, Incheon.

T20I record versus other nations

Records complete to WT20I #2088. Last updated 13 October 2024.

Opponent	M	W	L	T	NR	First match	First win
ICC Associate members
China	6	1	5	0	0	3 November 2018	4 November 2018
Hong Kong	2	0	2	0	0	21 September 2019	
Japan	3	0	3	0	0	19 September 2019	
Mongolia	1	1	0	0	0	9 October 2024	9 October 2024

== See also ==
- List of South Korea women Twenty20 International cricketers
