= Mai Yanagida =

Japanese cricketer (born 1992)

Personal information
- Full name: Mai Yanagida
- Born: 1 December 1992 (age 33); Kanagawa, Japan
- Height: 1.52 m (5 ft 0 in)
- Batting: Right-handed
- Bowling: Right-arm off break
- Role: Bowler

International information
- National side: Japan (2019–present)
- T20I debut (cap 11): 6 May 2019 v Indonesia
- Last T20I: 13 October 2024 v Hong Kong

Career statistics
Competition	WT20I
Matches	43
Runs scored	482
Batting average	15.06
100s/50s	0/2
Top score	64*
Balls bowled	509
Wickets	25
Bowling average	16.49
5 wickets in innings	0
10 wickets in match	0
Best bowling	4/8
Catches/stumpings	4/–
- Source: ESPNcricinfo, 30 October 2024

Mai Yanagida (Note: Mai Yanagida (Japanese: 柳田舞, Hepburn: Yanagida Mai)) (born 1 December 1992) is a Japanese international cricketer. In April 2019, she captained Japan's squad in the 2019 ICC Women's Qualifier EAP tournament in Vanuatu. She made her Women's Twenty20 International (WT20I) debut against Indonesia in the Women's East Asia-Pacific Qualifier tournament on 6 May 2019, which was also the debut match for the rest of the Japanese playing eleven. Yanagida captained the team during her debut match. She also played for the national team in the 2013 ICC Women's World Twenty20 Qualifier, and was part of her country's team at the 2014 Asian Games in Incheon, South Korea.

Born in Kanagawa, Yanagida played softball in her youth and first played cricket as a student at Waseda University.
