= Yeonhui Cricket Ground =

Cricket stadium in Incheon, South Korea

Ground information
- Location: 139 Simgok-dong, Seo District, Incheon
- Coordinates: 37.540201°N 126.668554°E
- Establishment: 2014; 11 years ago
- Capacity: 3000 (5000 with temporary seating facility)
- Owner: Korea Cricket Association
- Tenants: South Korea
- End names
- Pavilion End; Asiad Stadium End

International information
- First T20I: 25 September 2024: Indonesia v Japan
- Last T20I: 5 October 2024: South Korea v Philippines
- First WT20I: 3 November 2018: South Korea v China
- Last WT20I: 13 October 2024: Hong Kong v Japan

Team information
South Korea	(2014-)
- As of 13 October 2024; Source: Cricinfo

Yeonhui Cricket Ground is a cricket stadium in Incheon, South Korea built for Cricket at the 2014 Asian Games.

Both the men's and women's cricket matches in the 2014 Asian Games were played on this ground.

It has been reported that the crowd capacity of this ground is 3000. This was the first cricket stadium in South Korea.

In 2018, it hosted South Korea's first ever women's T20I match against China.

In September 2019, it hosted Women's T20 East Asia Cup between South Korea, China, Hong Kong and Japan.

== Women's Twenty20 International cricket ==
The stadium has hosted 11 Women's T20I matches to date.

Team (A)	Team (B)	Winner	Margin	Year
South Korea	China	China	By 8 wickets	2018
South Korea	China	China	By 10 wickets	2018
South Korea	China	South Korea	By 5 wickets	2018
South Korea	Japan	Japan	By 12 runs	2019
Hong Kong	China	Hong Kong	By 5 runs	2019
Hong Kong	Japan	Japan	By 2 wickets	2019
South Korea	Japan	Japan	By 81 runs	2019
South Korea	Hong Kong	Hong Kong	By 37 runs	2019
China	Japan	China	By 5 wickets	2019
China	Hong Kong	China	By 14 runs	2019
South Korea	Japan	Japan	By 32 runs	2019

== See also ==
- South Korea men's national cricket team
- South Korea women's national cricket team
- Korea Cricket Association
- ICC East Asia-Pacific
