= Associate international cricket in 2023–24 =

International cricket season

The 2023–24 Associate international cricket season included series starting from approximately late September 2023 to March 2024. All official 20-over matches between associate members of the ICC were eligible to have full men's Twenty20 International or women's Twenty20 International (T20I) status, as the International Cricket Council (ICC) granted T20I status to matches between all of its members from 1 July 2018 (women's teams) and 1 January 2019 (men's teams). The season included all T20I cricket series mostly involving ICC Associate members, that were played in addition to series covered in International cricket in 2023–24.

== Season overview ==
Men's international tours
Start date	Home team	Away team	Results [Matches]
Start date	Home team	Away team	T20I
30 September 2023	Gibraltar	Estonia	1–1 [2]
5 October 2023	Gibraltar	Serbia	2–0 [2]
15 October 2023	Gibraltar	Luxembourg	1–1 [2]
20 November 2023	Indonesia	Cambodia	4–2 [7]
22 December 2023	Indonesia	Philippines	2–4 [6]
27 February 2024	Qatar	Hong Kong	1–2 [3]
6 March 2024	Oman	Papua New Guinea	2–1 [3]
9 March 2024	Hong Kong	Nepal	1–0 [1]
11 March 2024	United Arab Emirates	Scotland	1–2 [3]
16 March 2024	Malaysia	Papua New Guinea	1–1 [2]
29 March 2024	Eswatini	Lesotho	3–2 [5]
Men's international tournaments
Start date	Tournament		Winners
28 September 2023	(Qatar) 2023 ICC Men's T20 World Cup Asia Qualifier A		Kuwait
30 September 2023	(Bermuda) 2023 ICC Men's T20 World Cup Americas Qualifier		Canada
4 October 2023	(Nigeria) 2023 West Africa Trophy		Nigeria
18 October 2023	2023 Nepal T20I Tri-Nation Series		United Arab Emirates
18 October 2023	(Argentina) 2023 South American Championship		Argentina
30 October 2023	(Nepal) 2023 ICC Men's T20 World Cup Asia Qualifier		Oman
22 November 2023	(Namibia) 2022–23 ICC Men's T20 World Cup Africa Qualifier		Namibia
6 December 2023	(South Africa) 2023 ACA Cup North-West/East Qualifier		—N/a
11 December 2023	(South Africa) 2023 ACA Africa T20 Cup		Uganda
27 January 2024	(Thailand) 2024 ACC Men's Challenger Cup		Saudi Arabia
12 February 2024	2024 Thailand Quadrangular Series		Saudi Arabia
14 February 2024	(Hong Kong) 2024 Twenty20 East Asia Cup		Hong Kong
27 February 2024	2024 Nepal T20I Tri-Nation Series		Netherlands
5 March 2024	2024 Malaysia Open T20 Championship		Bahrain
10 March 2024	2024 Hong Kong Tri-Nation Series		Papua New Guinea
17 March 2024	(Ghana) 2023 African Games		Zimbabwe Emerging

Women's international tours
Start date	Home team	Away team	Results [Matches]
Start date	Home team	Away team	WT20I
26 September 2023	United Arab Emirates	Namibia	2–4 [6]
13 October 2023	Argentina	Chile	3–0 [3]
27 December 2023	Philippines	Singapore	0–3 [3]
4 February 2024	Malaysia	Kuwait	3–0 [3]
Start date	Tournament		Winners
15 November 2023	2023 Hong Kong Women's Quadrangular Series		Hong Kong
9 December 2023	(Uganda) 2023 ICC Women's T20 World Cup Africa Division One		Zimbabwe
17 January 2024	(New Zealand) 2024 Women's T20I Pacific Cup		Papua New Guinea
10 February 2024	(Malaysia) 2024 ACC Women's Premier Cup		United Arab Emirates
25 February 2024	2024 Nigeria Invitational Women's T20I Tournament		Tanzania
7 March 2024	(Ghana) 2023 African Games		Zimbabwe

== September ==
=== Namibia women in the United Arab Emirates ===
WT20I series
No.	Date	Home captain	Away captain	Venue	Result
WT20I 1672	26 September	Chaya Mughal	Irene van Zyl	Dubai International Cricket Stadium, Dubai	United Arab Emirates by 19 runs
WT20I 1673	27 September	Esha Oza	Irene van Zyl	Dubai International Cricket Stadium, Dubai	Namibia by 9 wickets
WT20I 1674	29 September	Esha Oza	Irene van Zyl	Dubai International Cricket Stadium, Dubai	Namibia by 8 wickets
WT20I 1675	30 September	Esha Oza	Irene van Zyl	Dubai International Cricket Stadium, Dubai	Namibia by 7 runs
WT20I 1677	2 October	Esha Oza	Irene van Zyl	Dubai International Cricket Stadium, Dubai	Namibia by 8 wickets
WT20I 1679	3 October	Esha Oza	Irene van Zyl	ICC Academy Ground, Dubai	United Arab Emirates by 9 wickets

=== 2023 ICC Men's T20 World Cup Asia Qualifier A ===
Pos	Team	Pld	W	L	NR	Pts	NRR
1	Kuwait	6	5	1	0	10	2.202
2	Saudi Arabia	6	5	1	0	10	1.447
3	Qatar	6	2	4	0	4	0.349
4	Maldives	6	0	6	0	0	−4.332

Source: ESPNcricinfo

Round-robin
No.	Date	Team 1	Captain 1	Team 2	Captain 2	Venue	Result
T20I 2259	28 September	Qatar	Muhammad Murad	Kuwait	Mohammed Aslam	West End Park International Cricket Stadium, Doha	Kuwait by 7 wickets
T20I 2260	28 September	Maldives	Umar Adam	Saudi Arabia	Hisham Sheikh	West End Park International Cricket Stadium, Doha	Saudi Arabia by 62 runs
T20I 2263	29 September	Kuwait	Mohammed Aslam	Maldives	Umar Adam	West End Park International Cricket Stadium, Doha	Kuwait by 7 wickets
T20I 2264	29 September	Qatar	Muhammad Murad	Saudi Arabia	Hisham Sheikh	West End Park International Cricket Stadium, Doha	Saudi Arabia by 4 wickets
T20I 2271	1 October	Qatar	Muhammad Murad	Maldives	Umar Adam	West End Park International Cricket Stadium, Doha	Qatar by 9 wickets
T20I 2272	1 October	Kuwait	Mohamed Aslam	Saudi Arabia	Hisham Sheikh	West End Park International Cricket Stadium, Doha	Saudi Arabia by 3 wickets
T20I 2276	2 October	Qatar	Muhammad Murad	Kuwait	Mohammed Aslam	West End Park International Cricket Stadium, Doha	Kuwait by 5 wickets
T20I 2277	2 October	Maldives	Umar Adam	Saudi Arabia	Hisham Sheikh	West End Park International Cricket Stadium, Doha	Saudi Arabia by 9 wickets
T20I 2284	4 October	Kuwait	Mohammed Aslam	Maldives	Umar Adam	West End Park International Cricket Stadium, Doha	Kuwait by 8 wickets
T20I 2286	4 October	Qatar	Muhammad Murad	Saudi Arabia	Hisham Sheikh	West End Park International Cricket Stadium, Doha	Saudi Arabia by 7 wickets
T20I 2290	5 October	Maldives	Umar Adam	Qatar	Muhammad Murad	West End Park International Cricket Stadium, Doha	Qatar by 42 runs
T20I 2293	5 October	Kuwait	Mohammed Aslam	Saudi Arabia	Hisham Sheikh	West End Park International Cricket Stadium, Doha	Kuwait by 4 wickets

=== Estonia in Gibraltar ===
T20I series
No.	Date	Home captain	Away captain	Venue	Result
T20I 2265	30 September	Avinash Pai	Arslan Amjad	Europa Sports Park, Gibraltar	Gibraltar by 2 wickets
T20I 2267	30 September	Avinash Pai	Arslan Amjad	Europa Sports Park, Gibraltar	Estonia by 8 wickets

=== 2023 ICC Men's T20 World Cup Americas Qualifier ===
Pos	Team	Pld	W	L	NR	Pts	NRR
1	Canada	6	4	1	1	9	3.980
2	Bermuda	6	4	1	1	9	2.410
3	Cayman Islands	6	1	3	2	4	−3.748
4	Panama	6	0	4	2	2	−4.561

Source: ESPNcricinfo

Round-robin
No.	Date	Team 1	Captain 1	Team 2	Captain 2	Venue	Result
T20I 2266	30 September	Bermuda	Delray Rawlins	Canada	Saad Bin Zafar	White Hill Field, Sandys Parish	Bermuda by 86 runs
T20I 2268	30 September	Cayman Islands	Ramon Sealy	Panama	Laxman Gaonkar	White Hill Field, Sandys Parish	Cayman Islands by 7 wickets
T20I 2273	1 October	Bermuda	Delray Rawlins	Panama	Laxman Gaonkar	White Hill Field, Sandys Parish	Bermuda by 7 wickets
T20I 2274	1 October	Canada	Saad Bin Zafar	Cayman Islands	Ramon Sealy	White Hill Field, Sandys Parish	Canada by 108 runs
T20I 2280	3 October	Canada	Saad Bin Zafar	Panama	Laxman Gaonkar	Bermuda National Stadium, Hamilton	Canada by 163 runs
T20I 2281	3 October	Bermuda	Delray Rawlins	Cayman Islands	Ramon Sealy	Bermuda National Stadium, Hamilton	Bermuda by 53 runs
T20I 2288	4 October	Canada	Saad Bin Zafar	Cayman Islands	Ramon Sealy	Bermuda National Stadium, Hamilton	Canada by 166 runs
T20I 2289	4 October	Bermuda	Delray Rawlins	Panama	Laxman Gaonkar	Bermuda National Stadium, Hamilton	Bermuda by 5 wickets
T20I 2298a	6 October	Bermuda	Delray Rawlins	Cayman Islands	Ramon Sealy	White Hill Field, Sandys Parish	Match abandoned
T20I 2299a	6 October	Canada	Saad Bin Zafar	Panama	Laxman Gaonkar	White Hill Field, Sandys Parish	Match abandoned
T20I 2302a	7 October	Cayman Islands	Ramon Sealy	Panama	Laxman Gaonkar	Bermuda National Stadium, Hamilton	Match abandoned
T20I 2304	7 October	Bermuda	Delray Rawlins	Canada	Saad Bin Zafar	Bermuda National Stadium, Hamilton	Canada by 39 runs

== October ==
=== 2023 West Africa Trophy ===
Pos	Team	Pld	W	L	NR	Pts	NRR
1	Nigeria	9	9	0	0	18	2.520
2	Rwanda	9	4	5	0	8	0.591
3	Ghana	9	4	5	0	8	−1.260
4	Sierra Leone	9	1	8	0	2	−1.668

Source: ESPNcricinfo

Round-robin
No.	Date	Team 1	Captain 1	Team 2	Captain 2	Venue	Result
T20I 2285	4 October	Nigeria	Sylvester Okpe	Rwanda	Didier Ndikubwimana	Tafawa Balewa Square Cricket Oval, Lagos	Nigeria by 54 runs
T20I 2287	4 October	Ghana	Samson Awiah	Sierra Leone	George Ngegba	Tafawa Balewa Square Cricket Oval, Lagos	Ghana by 3 wickets
T20I 2292	5 October	Nigeria	Sylvester Okpe	Sierra Leone	George Ngegba	Tafawa Balewa Square Cricket Oval, Lagos	Nigeria by 63 runs
T20I 2295	5 October	Ghana	Samson Awiah	Rwanda	Didier Ndikubwimana	Tafawa Balewa Square Cricket Oval, Lagos	Match tied (Ghana won S/O)
T20I 2298	6 October	Nigeria	Sylvester Okpe	Ghana	Samson Awiah	Tafawa Balewa Square Cricket Oval, Lagos	Nigeria by 35 runs
T20I 2299	6 October	Rwanda	Didier Ndikubwimana	Sierra Leone	George Ngegba	Tafawa Balewa Square Cricket Oval, Lagos	Rwanda by 33 runs
T20I 2302	7 October	Nigeria	Sylvester Okpe	Rwanda	Didier Ndikubwimana	Tafawa Balewa Square Cricket Oval, Lagos	Nigeria by 6 wickets
T20I 2303	7 October	Ghana	Samson Awiah	Sierra Leone	George Ngegba	Tafawa Balewa Square Cricket Oval, Lagos	Ghana by 8 wickets
T20I 2305	8 October	Nigeria	Sylvester Okpe	Sierra Leone	George Ngegba	Tafawa Balewa Square Cricket Oval, Lagos	Nigeria by 9 wickets
T20I 2306	8 October	Ghana	Samson Awiah	Rwanda	Didier Ndikubwimana	Tafawa Balewa Square Cricket Oval, Lagos	Rwanda by 47 runs
T20I 2307	10 October	Nigeria	Sylvester Okpe	Ghana	Samson Awiah	Tafawa Balewa Square Cricket Oval, Lagos	Nigeria by 82 runs
T20I 2308	10 October	Rwanda	Didier Ndikubwimana	Sierra Leone	George Ngegba	Tafawa Balewa Square Cricket Oval, Lagos	Sierra Leone by 2 runs
T20I 2309	11 October	Nigeria	Sylvester Okpe	Ghana	Samson Awiah	Tafawa Balewa Square Cricket Oval, Lagos	Nigeria by 5 wickets
T20I 2310	11 October	Rwanda	Didier Ndikubwimana	Sierra Leone	George Ngegba	Tafawa Balewa Square Cricket Oval, Lagos	Rwanda by 5 wickets
T20I 2311	12 October	Ghana	Samson Awiah	Rwanda	Didier Ndikubwimana	Tafawa Balewa Square Cricket Oval, Lagos	Rwanda by 9 wickets
T20I 2312	12 October	Nigeria	Sylvester Okpe	Sierra Leone	George Ngegba	Tafawa Balewa Square Cricket Oval, Lagos	Nigeria by 53 runs
T20I 2313	14 October	Nigeria	Ademola Onikoyi	Rwanda	Didier Ndikubwimana	Tafawa Balewa Square Cricket Oval, Lagos	Nigeria by 8 wickets
T20I 2314	14 October	Ghana	Samson Awiah	Sierra Leone	George Ngegba	Tafawa Balewa Square Cricket Oval, Lagos	Ghana by 5 runs
Play-offs
No.	Date	Team 1	Captain 1	Team 2	Captain 2	Venue	Result
T20I 2316	15 October	Ghana	Samson Awiah	Sierra Leone	George Ngegba	Tafawa Balewa Square Cricket Oval, Lagos	Sierra Leone by 6 wickets
T20I 2318	15 October	Nigeria	Sylvester Okpe	Rwanda	Didier Ndikubwimana	Tafawa Balewa Square Cricket Oval, Lagos	Nigeria by 17 runs

=== Serbia in Gibraltar ===
T20I series
No.	Date	Home captain	Away captain	Venue	Result
T20I 2291	5 October	Avinash Pai	Simo Ivetic	Europa Sports Park, Gibraltar	Gibraltar by 7 wickets
T20I 2294	5 October	Avinash Pai	Simo Ivetic	Europa Sports Park, Gibraltar	Gibraltar by 7 wickets

=== Chile women in Argentina ===
T20I series
No.	Date	Home captain	Away captain	Venue	Result
WT20I 1682	13 October	Alison Stocks	Camila Valdes	St Albans Club, Buenos Aires	Argentina by 364 runs
WT20I 1684	14 October	Alison Stocks	Camila Valdes	St Albans Club, Buenos Aires	Argentina by 281 runs
WT20I 1686	15 October	Alison Stocks	Camila Valdes	St Albans Club, Buenos Aires	Argentina by 311 runs

=== Luxembourg in Gibraltar ===
T20I series
No.	Date	Home captain	Away captain	Venue	Result
T20I 2315	15 October	Avinash Pai	Joost Mees	Europa Sports Park, Gibraltar	Gibraltar by 24 runs
T20I 2317	15 October	Kayron Stagno	Joost Mees	Europa Sports Park, Gibraltar	Luxembourg by 11 runs

=== 2023 Nepal T20I Tri-Nation Series ===
Pos	Team	Pld	W	L	NR	Pts	NRR
1	Nepal	4	4	0	0	8	1.975
2	United Arab Emirates	4	1	3	0	2	−0.879
3	Hong Kong	4	1	3	0	2	−1.102

Source: ESPNcricinfo

T20I series
No.	Date	Team 1	Captain 1	Team 2	Captain 2	Venue	Result
T20I 2319	18 October	Nepal	Rohit Paudel	United Arab Emirates	Muhammad Waseem	Mulpani Cricket Stadium, Kageshwari-Manohara	Nepal by 7 wickets
T20I 2321	19 October	Nepal	Rohit Paudel	Hong Kong	Nizakat Khan	Mulpani Cricket Stadium, Kageshwari-Manohara	Nepal by 6 wickets
T20I 2324	21 October	Nepal	Rohit Paudel	Hong Kong	Nizakat Khan	Mulpani Cricket Stadium, Kageshwari-Manohara	Nepal by 79 runs
T20I 2325	22 October	Hong Kong	Nizakat Khan	United Arab Emirates	Muhammad Waseem	Mulpani Cricket Stadium, Kageshwari-Manohara	United Arab Emirates by 6 wickets
T20I 2326	23 October	Nepal	Rohit Paudel	United Arab Emirates	Muhammad Waseem	Mulpani Cricket Stadium, Kageshwari-Manohara	Nepal by 5 wickets
T20I 2328	25 October	Hong Kong	Nizakat Khan	United Arab Emirates	Muhammad Waseem	Mulpani Cricket Stadium, Kageshwari-Manohara	Hong Kong by 69 runs
Final
No.	Date	Team 1	Captain 1	Team 2	Captain 2	Venue	Result
T20I 2330	27 October	Nepal	Rohit Paudel	United Arab Emirates	Muhammad Waseem	Tribhuvan University International Cricket Ground, Kirtipur	United Arab Emirates by 4 wickets

=== 2023 Men's South American Cricket Championship ===
Pos	Team	Pld	W	L	NR	Pts	NRR
1	Argentina	3	3	0	0	6	2.717
2	Mexico	3	2	1	0	4	2.222
3	Peru	3	1	2	0	2	−1.676
4	Chile	3	0	3	0	0	−3.155

Source: ESPNcricinfo

Pos	Team	Pld	W	L	NR	Pts	NRR
1	Uruguay	3	2	1	0	4	0.265
2	Colombia	3	2	1	0	4	−0.118
3	Brazil	3	1	2	0	2	0.077
4	Panama	3	1	2	0	2	−0.282

Source: ESPNcricinfo

Round-robin
No.	Date	Team 1	Captain 1	Team 2	Captain 2	Venue	Result
1st Match	18 October	Brazil	Greigor Caisley	Uruguay	Bommineni Ravindra	St. George's College Ground 1, Quilmes	Uruguay by 19 runs
2nd Match	18 October	Argentina	Pedro Baron	Peru	Shaikh Ashraf	St. George's College Ground 2, Quilmes	Argentina by 52 runs
T20I 2320	18 October	Chile	Alex Carthew	Mexico	Tarun Sharma	St. George's College Ground 1, Quilmes	Mexico by 5 wickets
4th Match	18 October	Colombia	Visuddha Perera	Panama	Mahmed Bawa	St. George's College Ground 2, Quilmes	Colombia by 8 runs
5th Match	19 October	Brazil	Greigor Caisley	Panama	Mahmed Bawa	St. George's College Ground 1, Quilmes	Brazil by 3 wickets
6th Match	19 October	Colombia	Paul Reid	Uruguay	Bommineni Ravindra	St. George's College Ground 2, Quilmes	Uruguay by 6 wickets
T20I 2322	19 October	Argentina	Pedro Baron	Mexico	Tarun Sharma	St. George's College Ground 1, Quilmes	Argentina by 4 wickets
8th Match	19 October	Chile	Alex Carthew	Peru	Shaikh Ashraf	St. George's College Ground 2, Quilmes	Peru by 9 wickets
9th Match	20 October	Panama	Breeze Ahir	Uruguay	Bommineni Ravindra	St. George's College Ground 1, Quilmes	Panama by 19 runs
10th Match	20 October	Brazil	Greigor Caisley	Colombia	Oliver Barnes	St. George's College Ground 2, Quilmes	Colombia by 3 wickets
T20I 2323	20 October	Argentina	Pedro Baron	Chile	Alex Carthew	St. George's College Ground 1, Quilmes	Argentina by 10 wickets
12th Match	20 October	Mexico	Tarun Sharma	Peru	Hafez Farooq	St. George's College Ground 2, Quilmes	Mexico by 88 runs
Play-offs
No.	Date	Team 1	Captain 1	Team 2	Captain 2	Venue	Result
1st semi-final	21 October	Argentina	Pedro Baron	Colombia	Paul Reid	St. George's College Ground 1, Quilmes	Argentina by 41 runs
2nd semi-final	21 October	Mexico	Tarun Sharma	Uruguay	Bommineni Ravindra	St. George's College Ground 2, Quilmes	Uruguay by 5 wickets
7th-place play-off	21 October	Chile	Alex Carthew	Panama	Mahmed Bawa	St. George's College Ground 2, Quilmes	Panama by 18 runs
5th-place play-off	21 October	Brazil	Greigor Caisley	Peru	Hafez Farooq	St. George's College Ground 1, Quilmes	Brazil by 23 runs
3rd-place play-off	21 October	Colombia	Paul Reid	Mexico	Shantanu Kaveri	St. George's College Ground 2, Quilmes	Colombia by 7 runs
Final	21 October	Argentina	Pedro Baron	Uruguay	Avijit Mukherjee	St. George's College Ground 1, Quilmes	Argentina by 34 runs

=== 2023 ICC Men's T20 World Cup Asia Qualifier ===
Pos	Team	Pld	W	L	NR	Pts	NRR
1	Oman	3	3	0	0	6	0.983
2	Nepal	3	2	1	0	4	0.729
3	Malaysia	3	1	2	0	2	0.187
4	Singapore	3	0	3	0	0	−1.936

Source: ESPNcricinfo

Pos	Team	Pld	W	L	NR	Pts	NRR
1	United Arab Emirates	3	3	0	0	6	1.445
2	Bahrain	3	1	2	0	2	−0.398
3	Hong Kong	3	1	2	0	2	−0.433
4	Kuwait	3	1	2	0	2	−0.649

Source: ESPNcricinfo

Round-robin
No.	Date	Team 1	Captain 1	Team 2	Captain 2	Venue	Result
T20I 2333	30 October	Bahrain	Umer Toor	United Arab Emirates	Muhammad Waseem	Mulpani Cricket Stadium, Kageshwari-Manohara	United Arab Emirates by 5 wickets
T20I 2334	30 October	Nepal	Rohit Paudel	Singapore	Aritra Dutta	Tribhuvan University International Cricket Ground, Kirtipur	Nepal by 8 wickets
T20I 2335	30 October	Malaysia	Ahmad Faiz	Oman	Zeeshan Maqsood	Tribhuvan University International Cricket Ground, Kirtipur	Oman by 32 runs
T20I 2336	30 October	Hong Kong	Nizakat Khan	Kuwait	Mohammed Aslam	Mulpani Cricket Stadium, Kageshwari-Manohara	Hong Kong by 16 runs
T20I 2338	31 October	Oman	Zeeshan Maqsood	Singapore	Aritra Dutta	Tribhuvan University International Cricket Ground, Kirtipur	Oman by 22 runs
T20I 2339	31 October	Bahrain	Umer Toor	Hong Kong	Nizakat Khan	Mulpani Cricket Stadium, Kageshwari-Manohara	Bahrain by 20 runs
T20I 2340	31 October	Nepal	Rohit Paudel	Malaysia	Ahmad Faiz	Tribhuvan University International Cricket Ground, Kirtipur	Nepal by 6 wickets
T20I 2341	31 October	Kuwait	Mohammed Aslam	United Arab Emirates	Muhammad Waseem	Mulpani Cricket Stadium, Kageshwari-Manohara	United Arab Emirates by 5 wickets
T20I 2342	2 November	Nepal	Rohit Paudel	Oman	Zeeshan Maqsood	Tribhuvan University International Cricket Ground, Kirtipur	Oman by 5 runs
T20I 2343	2 November	Hong Kong	Nizakat Khan	United Arab Emirates	Muhammad Waseem	Mulpani Cricket Stadium, Kageshwari-Manohara	United Arab Emirates by 22 runs
T20I 2344	2 November	Malaysia	Ahmad Faiz	Singapore	Aritra Dutta	Tribhuvan University International Cricket Ground, Kirtipur	Malaysia by 60 runs
T20I 2345	2 November	Bahrain	Umer Toor	Kuwait	Mohammed Aslam	Mulpani Cricket Stadium, Kageshwari-Manohara	Kuwait by 4 wickets
Play-offs
No.	Date	Team 1	Captain 1	Team 2	Captain 2	Venue	Result
T20I 2346	3 November	Bahrain	Umer Toor	Oman	Zeeshan Maqsood	Tribhuvan University International Cricket Ground, Kirtipur	Oman by 10 wickets
T20I 2347	3 November	Nepal	Rohit Paudel	United Arab Emirates	Muhammad Waseem	Mulpani Cricket Stadium, Kageshwari-Manohara	Nepal by 8 wickets
T20I 2348	5 November	Nepal	Rohit Paudel	Oman	Zeeshan Maqsood	Tribhuvan University International Cricket Ground, Kirtipur	Match tied (Oman won S/O)

== November ==
=== 2023 Hong Kong Women's Quadrangular Series ===
Pos	Team	Pld	W	L	NR	Pts	NRR
1	Hong Kong	3	3	0	0	6	3.147
2	Tanzania	3	2	1	0	4	1.896
3	Nepal	3	1	2	0	2	−0.166
4	Japan	3	0	3	0	0	−4.000

Source: ESPNcricinfo

WT20I series
No.	Date	Team 1	Captain 1	Team 2	Captain 2	Venue	Result
WT20I 1692	15 November	Nepal	Indu Barma	Tanzania	Fatuma Kibasu	Hong Kong Cricket Club, Wong Nai Chung Gap	Tanzania by 27 runs
WT20I 1693	15 November	Hong Kong	Kary Chan	Japan	Mai Yanagida	Hong Kong Cricket Club, Wong Nai Chung Gap	Hong Kong by 9 wickets
WT20I 1694	16 November	Japan	Mai Yanagida	Tanzania	Fatuma Kibasu	Hong Kong Cricket Club, Wong Nai Chung Gap	Tanzania by 111 runs
WT20I 1695	16 November	Hong Kong	Kary Chan	Nepal	Indu Barma	Hong Kong Cricket Club, Wong Nai Chung Gap	Hong Kong by 9 wickets
WT20I 1696	18 November	Japan	Mai Yanagida	Nepal	Indu Barma	Hong Kong Cricket Club, Wong Nai Chung Gap	Nepal by 67 runs
WT20I 1697	18 November	Hong Kong	Kary Chan	Tanzania	Fatuma Kibasu	Hong Kong Cricket Club, Wong Nai Chung Gap	Hong Kong by 10 wickets
Play-offs
No.	Date	Team 1	Captain 1	Team 2	Captain 2	Venue	Result
WT20I 1698	19 November	Japan	Mai Yanagida	Nepal	Indu Barma	Hong Kong Cricket Club, Wong Nai Chung Gap	Nepal by 45 runs
WT20I 1699	19 November	Hong Kong	Kary Chan	Tanzania	Fatuma Kibasu	Hong Kong Cricket Club, Wong Nai Chung Gap	Hong Kong by 5 wickets

=== Cambodia in Indonesia ===
T20I series
No.	Date	Home captain	Away captain	Venue	Result
T20I 2349	20 November	Kadek Gamantika	Manish Sharma	Udayana Cricket Ground, Jimbaran	Indonesia by 7 wickets
T20I 2350	20 November	Kadek Gamantika	Manish Sharma	Udayana Cricket Ground, Jimbaran	Indonesia by 8 wickets
T20I 2351	21 November	Kadek Gamantika	Manish Sharma	Udayana Cricket Ground, Jimbaran	Cambodia by 8 wickets
T20I 2352	21 November	Kadek Gamantika	Manish Sharma	Udayana Cricket Ground, Jimbaran	Indonesia by 104 runs
T20I 2353	22 November	Kadek Gamantika	Manish Sharma	Udayana Cricket Ground, Jimbaran	Cambodia by 7 wickets
T20I 2357	23 November	Kadek Gamantika	Manish Sharma	Udayana Cricket Ground, Jimbaran	Indonesia by concession
T20I 2357a	23 November	Kadek Gamantika	Manish Sharma	Udayana Cricket Ground, Jimbaran	Match abandoned

=== 2023 ICC Men's T20 World Cup Africa Qualifier ===
Pos	Team	Pld	W	L	NR	Pts	NRR
1	Namibia	6	6	0	0	12	2.658
2	Uganda	6	5	1	0	10	1.334
3	Zimbabwe	6	4	2	0	8	3.178
4	Kenya	6	3	3	0	6	−0.911
5	Nigeria	6	1	4	1	3	−1.026
6	Tanzania	6	1	5	0	2	−1.507
7	Rwanda	6	0	5	1	1	−4.303

Source: ESPNcricinfo

Round-robin
No.	Date	Team 1	Captain 1	Team 2	Captain 2	Venue	Result
T20I 2354	22 November	Kenya	Rakep Patel	Rwanda	Clinton Rubagumya	United Ground, Windhoek	Kenya by 17 runs
T20I 2355	22 November	Tanzania	Abhik Patwa	Uganda	Brian Masaba	Wanderers Cricket Ground, Windhoek	Uganda by 8 wickets
T20I 2356	22 November	Namibia	Gerhard Erasmus	Zimbabwe	Sikandar Raza	Wanderers Cricket Ground, Windhoek	Namibia by 7 wickets
T20I 2358	23 November	Kenya	Lucas Oluoch	Nigeria	Sylvester Okpe	United Ground, Windhoek	Kenya by 4 wickets
T20I 2359	23 November	Tanzania	Abhik Patwa	Zimbabwe	Sikandar Raza	United Ground, Windhoek	Zimbabwe by 9 wickets
T20I 2361	24 November	Nigeria	Sylvester Okpe	Rwanda	Clinton Rubagumya	Wanderers Cricket Ground, Windhoek	No result
T20I 2362	24 November	Namibia	Gerhard Erasmus	Uganda	Brian Masaba	Wanderers Cricket Ground, Windhoek	Namibia by 6 wickets
T20I 2363	25 November	Kenya	Lucas Oluoch	Tanzania	Abhik Patwa	Wanderers Cricket Ground, Windhoek	Kenya by 50 runs
T20I 2364	25 November	Namibia	Gerhard Erasmus	Rwanda	Clinton Rubagumya	Wanderers Cricket Ground, Windhoek	Namibia by 68 runs (DLS)
T20I 2365	26 November	Uganda	Brian Masaba	Zimbabwe	Sikandar Raza	United Ground, Windhoek	Uganda by 5 wickets
T20I 2366	26 November	Nigeria	Sylvester Okpe	Tanzania	Abhik Patwa	United Ground, Windhoek	Nigeria by 3 wickets
T20I 2368	27 November	Namibia	Gerhard Erasmus	Kenya	Lucas Oluoch	United Ground, Windhoek	Namibia by 6 wickets
T20I 2369	27 November	Rwanda	Clinton Rubagumya	Zimbabwe	Sikandar Raza	Wanderers Cricket Ground, Windhoek	Zimbabwe by 144 runs
T20I 2370	27 November	Nigeria	Sylvester Okpe	Uganda	Brian Masaba	United Ground, Windhoek	Uganda by 9 wickets
T20I 2371	28 November	Namibia	Gerhard Erasmus	Tanzania	Abhik Patwa	Wanderers Cricket Ground, Windhoek	Namibia by 58 runs
T20I 2373	29 November	Nigeria	Sylvester Okpe	Zimbabwe	Sikandar Raza	United Ground, Windhoek	Zimbabwe by 6 wickets
T20I 2374	29 November	Rwanda	Clinton Rubagumya	Tanzania	Abhik Patwa	Wanderers Cricket Ground, Windhoek	Tanzania by 51 runs
T20I 2375	29 November	Kenya	Lucas Oluoch	Uganda	Brian Masaba	Wanderers Cricket Ground, Windhoek	Uganda by 33 runs
T20I 2376	30 November	Kenya	Lucas Oluoch	Zimbabwe	Sikandar Raza	United Ground, Windhoek	Zimbabwe by 110 runs
T20I 2377	30 November	Rwanda	Clinton Rubagumya	Uganda	Brian Masaba	Wanderers Cricket Ground, Windhoek	Uganda by 9 wickets
T20I 2378	30 November	Namibia	Gerhard Erasmus	Nigeria	Sylvester Okpe	Wanderers Cricket Ground, Windhoek	Namibia by 8 wickets

== December ==
=== 2023 ACA Africa T20 Cup North-West/East Qualifier ===
Pos	Team	Pld	W	L	NR	Pts	NRR
1	Rwanda	2	2	0	0	4	1.852
2	Ghana	2	1	1	0	2	1.698
3	Gambia	2	0	2	0	0	−4.128

Source: ESPNcricinfo

Pos	Team	Pld	W	L	NR	Pts	NRR
1	Kenya	3	3	0	0	6	5.959
2	Sierra Leone	3	2	1	0	4	3.156
3	Cameroon	3	1	2	0	2	−4.017
4	Mali	3	0	3	0	0	−7.090

Source: ESPNcricinfo

Group stage
No.	Date	Team 1	Captain 1	Team 2	Captain 2	Venue	Result
T20I 2381	6 December	Cameroon	Julien Abega	Kenya	Lucas Oluoch	Willowmoore Park, Benoni	Kenya by 10 wickets
T20I 2382	7 December	Cameroon	Julien Abega	Mali	Cheick Keita	Willowmoore Park, Benoni	Cameroon by 39 runs (DLS)
T20I 2383	7 December	Kenya	Lucas Oluoch	Sierra Leone	George Ngegba	Willowmoore Park, Benoni	Kenya by 8 wickets
T20I 2385	8 December	Gambia	Ismaila Tamba	Rwanda	Clinton Rubagumya	Willowmoore Park, Benoni	Rwanda by 4 wickets
T20I 2386	8 December	Kenya	Lucas Oluoch	Mali	Cheick Keita	Willowmoore Park, Benoni	Kenya by 10 wickets
T20I 2387	9 December	Ghana	Samson Awiah	Rwanda	Clinton Rubagumya	Willowmoore Park, Benoni	Rwanda by 3 wickets
T20I 2389	9 December	Mali	Cheick Keita	Sierra Leone	George Ngegba	Willowmoore Park, Benoni	Sierra Leone by 8 wickets
T20I 2390	10 December	Gambia	Ismaila Tamba	Ghana	Samson Awiah	Willowmoore Park, Benoni	Ghana by 98 runs
T20I 2392	10 December	Cameroon	Julien Abega	Sierra Leone	George Ngegba	Willowmoore Park, Benoni	Sierra Leone by 9 wickets

=== 2023 ICC Women's T20 World Cup Africa Qualifier Division One ===
Pos	Team	Pld	W	L	NR	Pts	NRR
1	Zimbabwe	3	3	0	0	6	3.524
2	Tanzania	3	2	1	0	4	0.779
3	Kenya	3	1	2	0	2	−1.491
4	Botswana	3	0	3	0	0	−4.530

Source: ESPNcricinfo

Pos	Team	Pld	W	L	NR	Pts	NRR
1	Uganda	3	3	0	0	6	0.960
2	Namibia	3	2	1	0	4	0.204
3	Nigeria	3	1	2	0	2	−0.687
4	Rwanda	3	0	3	0	0	−0.726

Source: ESPNcricinfo

Group stage
No.	Date	Team 1	Captain 1	Team 2	Captain 2	Venue	Result
WT20I 1707	9 December	Kenya	Esther Wachira	Zimbabwe	Mary-Anne Musonda	Entebbe Cricket Oval, Entebbe	Zimbabwe by 62 runs
WT20I 1708	9 December	Botswana	Laura Mophakedi	Tanzania	Neema Pius	Entebbe Cricket Oval, Entebbe	Tanzania by 10 wickets
WT20I 1710	10 December	Namibia	Irene van Zyl	Nigeria	Blessing Etim	Entebbe Cricket Oval, Entebbe	Namibia by 9 runs
WT20I 1711	10 December	Uganda	Concy Aweko	Rwanda	Marie Bimenyimana	Entebbe Cricket Oval, Entebbe	Uganda by 6 wickets
WT20I 1713	11 December	Kenya	Esther Wachira	Tanzania	Neema Pius	Entebbe Cricket Oval, Entebbe	Tanzania by 7 wickets (DLS)
WT20I 1714	11 December	Botswana	Laura Mophakedi	Zimbabwe	Mary-Anne Musonda	Entebbe Cricket Oval, Entebbe	Zimbabwe by 115 runs
WT20I 1715	12 December	Nigeria	Blessing Etim	Rwanda	Marie Bimenyimana	Entebbe Cricket Oval, Entebbe	Nigeria by 3 runs (DLS)
WT20I 1716	12 December	Uganda	Concy Aweko	Namibia	Irene van Zyl	Entebbe Cricket Oval, Entebbe	Uganda by 4 wickets
WT20I 1717	13 December	Botswana	Laura Mophakedi	Kenya	Esther Wachira	Entebbe Cricket Oval, Entebbe	Kenya by 20 runs (DLS)
WT20I 1718	13 December	Tanzania	Neema Pius	Zimbabwe	Mary-Anne Musonda	Entebbe Cricket Oval, Entebbe	Zimbabwe by 9 wickets
WT20I 1719	14 December	Namibia	Irene van Zyl	Rwanda	Marie Bimenyimana	Entebbe Cricket Oval, Entebbe	Namibia by 11 runs
WT20I 1720	14 December	Uganda	Concy Aweko	Nigeria	Blessing Etim	Entebbe Cricket Oval, Entebbe	Uganda by 6 wickets
Play-offs
No.	Date	Team 1	Captain 1	Team 2	Captain 2	Venue	Result
WT20I 1721	16 December	Namibia	Irene van Zyl	Zimbabwe	Mary-Anne Musonda	Entebbe Cricket Oval, Entebbe	Zimbabwe by 86 runs
WT20I 1722	16 December	Uganda	Concy Aweko	Tanzania	Neema Pius	Entebbe Cricket Oval, Entebbe	Uganda by 10 runs
WT20I 1723	17 December	Namibia	Irene van Zyl	Tanzania	Neema Pius	Entebbe Cricket Oval, Entebbe	No result
WT20I 1724	17 December	Uganda	Concy Aweko	Zimbabwe	Mary-Anne Musonda	Entebbe Cricket Oval, Entebbe	Zimbabwe by 6 wickets

=== 2023 ACA Africa T20 Cup ===
Pos	Team	Pld	W	L	NR	Pts	NRR
1	Uganda	3	2	1	0	4	1.676
2	Malawi	3	2	1	0	4	0.201
3	Mozambique	3	1	2	0	2	−0.697
4	Rwanda	3	1	2	0	2	−1.079

Source: ESPNcricinfo

Pos	Team	Pld	W	L	NR	Pts	NRR
1	Kenya	3	3	0	0	6	3.326
2	Botswana	3	1	2	0	2	−0.117
3	Sierra Leone	3	1	2	0	2	−1.328
4	Ghana	3	1	2	0	2	−1.493

Source: ESPNcricinfo

Group stage
No.	Date	Team 1	Captain 1	Team 2	Captain 2	Venue	Result
T20I 2393	11 December	Rwanda	Didier Ndikubwimana	Uganda	Brian Masaba	Willowmoore Park, Benoni	Rwanda by 2 runs
T20I 2394	11 December	Botswana	Karabo Motlhanka	Ghana	Samson Awiah	Willowmoore Park, Benoni	Botswana by 38 runs
T20I 2395	12 December	Kenya	Lucas Oluoch	Sierra Leone	George Ngegba	Willowmoore Park, Benoni	Kenya by 8 wickets
T20I 2398	13 December	Malawi	Moazzam Baig	Uganda	Brian Masaba	Willowmoore Park, Benoni	Uganda by 7 wickets
T20I 2399	13 December	Ghana	Samson Awiah	Kenya	Lucas Oluoch	Willowmoore Park, Benoni	Kenya by 8 wickets
T20I 2400	14 December	Malawi	Moazzam Baig	Mozambique	Francisco Couana	Willowmoore Park, Benoni	Malawi by 6 wickets
T20I 2403	15 December	Botswana	Karabo Motlhanka	Sierra Leone	George Ngegba	Willowmoore Park, Benoni	Sierra Leone by 2 wickets
T20I 2404	15 December	Mozambique	Francisco Couana	Uganda	Kenneth Waiswa	Willowmoore Park, Benoni	Uganda by 51 runs
T20I 2405	16 December	Malawi	Moazzam Baig	Rwanda	Didier Ndikubwimana	Willowmoore Park, Benoni	Malawi by 46 runs
T20I 2406	16 December	Botswana	Karabo Motlhanka	Kenya	Lucas Oluoch	Willowmoore Park, Benoni	Kenya by 40 runs
T20I 2408	17 December	Mozambique	Francisco Couana	Rwanda	Didier Ndikubwimana	Willowmoore Park, Benoni	Mozambique by 5 wickets
T20I 2409	17 December	Ghana	Samson Awiah	Sierra Leone	George Ngegba	Willowmoore Park, Benoni	Ghana by 2 wickets
Play-offs
No.	Date	Team 1	Captain 1	Team 2	Captain 2	Venue	Result
T20I 2410	18 December	Botswana	Karabo Motlhanka	Uganda	Brian Masaba	Willowmoore Park, Benoni	Uganda by 10 wickets
T20I 2411	18 December	Kenya	Lucas Oluoch	Malawi	Moazzam Baig	Willowmoore Park, Benoni	Kenya by 4 runs (DLS)
T20I 2412	19 December	Botswana	Karabo Motlhanka	Malawi	Moazzam Baig	Willowmoore Park, Benoni	Botswana by 3 wickets
T20I 2413	19 December	Kenya	Lucas Oluoch	Uganda	Brian Masaba	Willowmoore Park, Benoni	Uganda by 91 runs

=== Philippines in Indonesia ===
T20I series
No.	Date	Home captain	Away captain	Venue	Result
T20I 2416	22 December	Kadek Gamantika	Daniel Smith	Udayana Cricket Ground, Jimbaran	Philippines by 2 runs
T20I 2417	23 December	Kadek Gamantika	Daniel Smith	Udayana Cricket Ground, Jimbaran	Indonesia by 10 wickets
T20I 2418	23 December	Kadek Gamantika	Daniel Smith	Udayana Cricket Ground, Jimbaran	Indonesia by 20 runs
T20I 2419	24 December	Kadek Gamantika	Daniel Smith	Udayana Cricket Ground, Jimbaran	Philippines by 8 wickets
T20I 2420	24 December	Kadek Gamantika	Daniel Smith	Udayana Cricket Ground, Jimbaran	Match tied (Philippines won S/O)
T20I 2421	26 December	Kadek Gamantika	Daniel Smith	Udayana Cricket Ground, Jimbaran	Philippines by 7 wickets

=== Singapore women in Philippines ===
WT20I series
No.	Date	Home captain	Away captain	Venue	Result
WT20I 1725	27 December	Catherine Bagaoisan	Shafina Mahesh	Friendship Oval, Dasmariñas	Singapore by 189 runs
WT20I 1726	28 December	Catherine Bagaoisan	Shafina Mahesh	Friendship Oval, Dasmariñas	Singapore by 79 runs
WT20I 1727	29 December	Catherine Bagaoisan	Shafina Mahesh	Friendship Oval, Dasmariñas	Singapore by 9 wickets

== January ==
=== 2024 Women's Pacific Cup ===
Pos	Team	Pld	W	L	T	NR	Pts	NRR
1	New Zealand Māori	5	5	0	0	0	10	2.486
2	Papua New Guinea	5	4	1	0	0	8	3.065
3	Samoa	5	3	2	0	0	6	−0.956
4	Vanuatu	5	2	3	0	0	4	2.218
5	Cook Islands	5	1	4	0	0	2	−2.896
6	Fiji	5	0	5	0	0	0	−4.226

Source: ESPNcricinfo

Round-robin
No.	Date	Team 1	Captain 1	Team 2	Captain 2	Venue	Result
1st match	17 January	New Zealand Māori	Kerry-Anne Tomlinson	Papua New Guinea	Brenda Tau	Lloyd Elsmore Park 1, Auckland	New Zealand Māori won by 7 wickets
WT20I 1731	17 January	Cook Islands	Tetiare Mataora	Samoa	Regina Lili'i	Lloyd Elsmore Park 2, Auckland	Samoa by 1 run
WT20I 1732	17 January	Fiji	Ilisapeci Waqavakatoga	Vanuatu	Selina Solman	Lloyd Elsmore Park 3, Auckland	Vanuatu by 135 runs
WT20I 1733	17 January	Cook Islands	Tetiare Mataora	Fiji	Ilisapeci Waqavakatoga	Lloyd Elsmore Park 1, Auckland	Cook Islands by 9 wickets
5th match	17 January	New Zealand Māori	Kerry-Anne Tomlinson	Vanuatu	Selina Solman	Lloyd Elsmore Park 2, Auckland	New Zealand Māori won by 5 wickets
WT20I 1734	17 January	Papua New Guinea	Brenda Tau	Samoa	Regina Lili'i	Lloyd Elsmore Park 3, Auckland	Papua New Guinea by 10 wickets
WT20I 1735	18 January	Samoa	Regina Lili'i	Vanuatu	Selina Solman	Lloyd Elsmore Park 1, Auckland	Samoa by 3 wickets
WT20I 1736	18 January	Cook Islands	Tetiare Mataora	Papua New Guinea	Brenda Tau	Lloyd Elsmore Park 2, Auckland	Papua New Guinea by 128 runs
9th match	18 January	New Zealand Māori	Samantha Curtis	Fiji	Ilisapeci Waqavakatoga	Lloyd Elsmore Park 3, Auckland	New Zealand Māori won by 67 runs
WT20I 1737	19 January	Papua New Guinea	Brenda Tau	Vanuatu	Selina Solman	Lloyd Elsmore Park 1, Auckland	Papua New Guinea by 23 runs
WT20I 1738	19 January	Fiji	Ilisapeci Waqavakatoga	Samoa	Regina Lili'i	Lloyd Elsmore Park 2, Auckland	Samoa by 26 runs
12th match	19 January	New Zealand Māori	Jess McFadyen	Cook Islands	Tetiare Mataora	Lloyd Elsmore Park 3, Auckland	New Zealand Māori won by 9 wickets
WT20I 1739	19 January	Cook Islands	Tetiare Mataora	Vanuatu	Selina Solman	Lloyd Elsmore Park 1, Auckland	Vanuatu by 120 runs
14th match	19 January	New Zealand Māori	Jess McFadyen	Samoa	Regina Lili'i	Lloyd Elsmore Park 2, Auckland	New Zealand Māori won by 5 wickets
WT20I 1740	19 January	Fiji	Ilisapeci Waqavakatoga	Papua New Guinea	Brenda Tau	Lloyd Elsmore Park 3, Auckland	Papua New Guinea by 9 wickets
Play-offs
No.	Date	Team 1	Captain 1	Team 2	Captain 2	Venue	Result
WT20I 1741	21 January	Cook Islands	Tetiare Mataora	Fiji	Ilisapeci Waqavakatoga	Lloyd Elsmore Park 3, Auckland	Cook Islands by 9 wickets
WT20I 1742	21 January	Samoa	Regina Lili'i	Vanuatu	Selina Solman	Lloyd Elsmore Park 2, Auckland	Vanuatu by 23 runs
Final	21 January	New Zealand Māori	Kerry-Anne Tomlinson	Papua New Guinea	Brenda Tau	Lloyd Elsmore Park 1, Auckland	Papua New Guinea by 5 wickets

=== 2024 ACC Men's Challenger Cup ===
==== Qualifier ====
Pos	Team	Pld	W	L	NR	Pts	NRR
1	Cambodia	2	2	0	0	4	4.269
2	Myanmar	2	1	1	0	2	−1.353
3	China	2	0	2	0	0	−2.415

Source: ESPNcricinfo

Round-robin
No.	Date	Team 1	Captain 1	Team 2	Captain 2	Venue	Result
T20I 2439	27 January	Cambodia	Manish Sharma	Myanmar	Htet Lin Aung	Terdthai Cricket Ground, Bangkok	Cambodia by 7 wickets
T20I 2440	28 January	Cambodia	Luqman Butt	China	Wei Guo Lei	Terdthai Cricket Ground, Bangkok	Cambodia by 93 runs
T20I 2441	29 January	China	Wei Guo Lei	Myanmar	Htet Lin Aung	Terdthai Cricket Ground, Bangkok	Myanmar by 1 wicket
Play-off
T20I 2442	30 January	China	Wei Guo Lei	Myanmar	Htet Lin Aung	Terdthai Cricket Ground, Bangkok	China by 47 runs

==== Group stage ====
Pos	Team	Pld	W	L	NR	Pts	NRR
1	Saudi Arabia	3	3	0	0	6	4.282
2	Cambodia	3	2	1	0	4	−1.140
3	Indonesia	3	1	2	0	2	−1.264
4	Bhutan	3	0	3	0	0	−1.674

Source: ESPNcricinfo

Pos	Team	Pld	W	L	NR	Pts	NRR
1	Singapore	3	2	1	0	4	1.015
2	Japan	3	2	1	0	4	0.900
3	Thailand	3	2	1	0	4	0.810
4	Maldives	3	0	3	0	0	−3.054

Source: ESPNcricinfo

Group stage
No.	Date	Team 1	Captain 1	Team 2	Captain 2	Venue	Result
T20I 2443	1 February	Cambodia	Luqman Butt	Saudi Arabia	Hisham Sheikh	Terdthai Cricket Ground, Bangkok	Saudi Arabia by 88 runs
T20I 2444	1 February	Bhutan	Thinley Jamtsho	Indonesia	Kadek Gamantika	Terdthai Cricket Ground, Bangkok	Indonesia by 16 runs
T20I 2445	2 February	Maldives	Hassan Rasheed	Singapore	Aritra Dutta	Terdthai Cricket Ground, Bangkok	Singapore by 41 runs
T20I 2446	2 February	Thailand	Austin Lazarus	Japan	Kendel Kadowaki-Fleming	Terdthai Cricket Ground, Bangkok	Japan by 46 runs
T20I 2447	3 February	Bhutan	Thinley Jamtsho	Saudi Arabia	Hisham Sheikh	Terdthai Cricket Ground, Bangkok	Saudi Arabia by 8 wickets
T20I 2448	3 February	Cambodia	Luqman Butt	Indonesia	Kadek Gamantika	Terdthai Cricket Ground, Bangkok	Cambodia by 6 wickets
T20I 2449	4 February	Thailand	Austin Lazarus	Singapore	Aritra Dutta	Terdthai Cricket Ground, Bangkok	Thailand by 7 wickets
T20I 2450	4 February	Japan	Kendel Kadowaki-Fleming	Maldives	Hassan Rasheed	Terdthai Cricket Ground, Bangkok	Japan by 42 runs
T20I 2451	5 February	Indonesia	Kadek Gamantika	Saudi Arabia	Hisham Sheikh	Terdthai Cricket Ground, Bangkok	Saudi Arabia by 82 runs
T20I 2452	5 February	Bhutan	Thinley Jamtsho	Cambodia	Luqman Butt	Terdthai Cricket Ground, Bangkok	Cambodia by 10 runs
T20I 2453	6 February	Japan	Kendel Kadowaki-Fleming	Singapore	Aritra Dutta	Terdthai Cricket Ground, Bangkok	Singapore by 34 runs
T20I 2454	6 February	Thailand	Austin Lazarus	Maldives	Hassan Rasheed	Terdthai Cricket Ground, Bangkok	Thailand by 8 wickets

==== Play-offs ====
Play-offs
No.	Date	Team 1	Captain 1	Team 2	Captain 2	Venue	Result
T20I 2455	7 February	Thailand	Austin Lazarus	Indonesia	Kadek Gamantika	Terdthai Cricket Ground, Bangkok	Thailand by 7 wickets
T20I 2456	7 February	Bhutan	Thinley Jamtsho	Maldives	Hassan Rasheed	Terdthai Cricket Ground, Bangkok	Maldives by 32 runs
T20I 2457	9 February	Japan	Kendel Kadowaki-Fleming	Saudi Arabia	Hisham Sheikh	Terdthai Cricket Ground, Bangkok	Saudi Arabia by 10 wickets
T20I 2458	9 February	Cambodia	Luqman Butt	Singapore	Aritra Dutta	Terdthai Cricket Ground, Bangkok	Cambodia by 6 wickets
T20I 2460	11 February	Japan	Kendel Kadowaki-Fleming	Singapore	Aritra Dutta	Terdthai Cricket Ground, Bangkok	Singapore by 8 wickets
T20I 2461	11 February	Cambodia	Luqman Butt	Saudi Arabia	Hisham Sheikh	Terdthai Cricket Ground, Bangkok	Saudi Arabia by 5 wickets

== February ==
=== Kuwait women in Malaysia ===
WT20I series
No.	Date	Home captain	Away captain	Venue	Result
WT20I 1751	4 February	Winifred Duraisingam	Amna Tariq	Johor Cricket Academy Oval, Johor Bahru	Malaysia by 26 runs
WT20I 1752	5 February	Winifred Duraisingam	Amna Tariq	Johor Cricket Academy Oval, Johor Bahru	Malaysia by 5 wickets
WT20I 1753	6 February	Winifred Duraisingam	Amna Tariq	Johor Cricket Academy Oval, Johor Bahru	Malaysia by 10 wickets

=== 2024 ACC Women's Premier Cup ===
Pos	Team	Pld	W	L	NR	Pts	NRR
1	Thailand	3	3	0	0	6	5.729
2	Kuwait	3	2	1	0	4	−0.514
3	Myanmar	3	1	2	0	2	−1.507
4	Singapore	3	0	3	0	0	−1.991

Source: ESPNcricinfo

Pos	Team	Pld	W	L	NR	Pts	NRR
1	United Arab Emirates	3	3	0	0	6	5.751
2	Japan	3	2	1	0	4	−0.462
3	China	3	1	2	0	2	−1.756
4	Oman	3	0	3	0	0	−3.510

Source: ESPNcricinfo

Pos	Team	Pld	W	L	NR	Pts	NRR
1	Malaysia	3	3	0	0	6	3.006
2	Indonesia	3	2	1	0	4	2.080
3	Qatar	3	1	2	0	2	−0.602
4	Bahrain	3	0	3	0	0	−4.872

Source: ESPNcricinfo

Pos	Team	Pld	W	L	NR	Pts	NRR
1	Nepal	3	3	0	0	6	5.585
2	Hong Kong	3	2	1	0	4	3.615
3	Bhutan	3	1	2	0	2	−0.322
4	Maldives	3	0	3	0	0	−8.000

Source: ESPNcricinfo

Group stage
No.	Date	Team 1	Captain 1	Team 2	Captain 2	Venue	Result
WT20I 1754	10 February	Myanmar	Theint Soe	Thailand	Naruemol Chaiwai	Bayuemas Oval, Pandamaran	Thailand by 10 wickets
WT20I 1755	10 February	China	Huang Zhuo	United Arab Emirates	Esha Oza	UKM-YSD Cricket Oval, Bangi	United Arab Emirates by 121 runs
WT20I 1756	10 February	Malaysia	Winifred Duraisingam	Indonesia	Ni Wayan Sariani	Royal Selangor Club, Kuala Lumpur	Malaysia by 6 wickets
WT20I 1757	10 February	Hong Kong	Kary Chan	Nepal	Indu Barma	Selangor Turf Club, Seri Kembangan	Nepal by 8 wickets
WT20I 1758	10 February	Kuwait	Amna Tariq	Singapore	Shafina Mahesh	Bayuemas Oval, Pandamaran	Kuwait by 10 wickets
WT20I 1759	10 February	Japan	Mai Yanagida	Oman	Priyanka Mendonca	UKM-YSD Cricket Oval, Bangi	Japan by 14 runs
WT20I 1760	10 February	Bahrain	Deepika Rasangika	Qatar	Aysha	Royal Selangor Club, Kuala Lumpur	Qatar by 7 wickets
WT20I 1761	10 February	Bhutan	Dechen Wangmo	Maldives	Sumayya Abdul	Selangor Turf Club, Seri Kembangan	Bhutan by 94 runs
WT20I 1762	11 February	Kuwait	Amna Tariq	Thailand	Naruemol Chaiwai	UKM-YSD Cricket Oval, Bangi	Thailand by 96 runs
WT20I 1763	11 February	Oman	Priyanka Mendonca	United Arab Emirates	Esha Oza	Royal Selangor Club, Kuala Lumpur	United Arab Emirates by 148 runs
WT20I 1764	11 February	Bahrain	Deepika Rasangika	Indonesia	Ni Wayan Sariani	Selangor Turf Club, Seri Kembangan	Indonesia by 88 runs
WT20I 1765	11 February	Bhutan	Dechen Wangmo	Nepal	Indu Barma	Bayuemas Oval, Pandamaran	Nepal by 8 wickets
WT20I 1766	11 February	Myanmar	Theint Soe	Singapore	Shafina Mahesh	UKM-YSD Cricket Oval, Bangi	Myanmar by 5 wickets
WT20I 1767	11 February	China	Huang Zhuo	Japan	Mai Yanagida	Royal Selangor Club, Kuala Lumpur	Japan by 4 wickets
WT20I 1768	11 February	Malaysia	Winifred Duraisingam	Qatar	Aysha	Selangor Turf Club, Seri Kembangan	Malaysia by 39 runs
WT20I 1769	11 February	Hong Kong	Kary Chan	Maldives	Sumayya Abdul	Bayuemas Oval, Pandamaran	Hong Kong by 172 runs
WT20I 1770	13 February	Kuwait	Amna Tariq	Myanmar	Theint Soe	Royal Selangor Club, Kuala Lumpur	Kuwait by 27 runs
WT20I 1771	13 February	China	Huang Zhuo	Oman	Priyanka Mendonca	Selangor Turf Club, Seri Kembangan	China by 8 wickets
WT20I 1772	13 February	Malaysia	Winifred Duraisingam	Bahrain	Deepika Rasangika	Bayuemas Oval, Pandamaran	Malaysia by 126 runs
WT20I 1773	13 February	Bhutan	Dechen Wangmo	Hong Kong	Kary Chan	UKM-YSD Cricket Oval, Bangi	Hong Kong by 72 runs
WT20I 1774	13 February	Singapore	Shafina Mahesh	Thailand	Naruemol Chaiwai	Royal Selangor Club, Kuala Lumpur	Thailand by 86 runs
WT20I 1775	13 February	Japan	Mai Yanagida	United Arab Emirates	Esha Oza	Selangor Turf Club, Seri Kembangan	United Arab Emirates by 10 wickets
WT20I 1776	13 February	Indonesia	Ni Wayan Sariani	Qatar	Aysha	Bayuemas Oval, Pandamaran	Indonesia by 9 wickets
WT20I 1777	13 February	Maldives	Sumayya Abdul	Nepal	Indu Barma	UKM-YSD Cricket Oval, Bangi	Nepal by 214 runs
Play-offs
WT20I 1778	14 February	Hong Kong	Kary Chan	Thailand	Naruemol Chaiwai	Bayuemas Oval, Pandamaran	Thailand by 3 wickets
WT20I 1779	14 February	Indonesia	Ni Wayan Sariani	United Arab Emirates	Esha Oza	UKM-YSD Cricket Oval, Bangi	United Arab Emirates by 56 runs
WT20I 1780	14 February	Malaysia	Winifred Duraisingam	Japan	Mai Yanagida	Bayuemas Oval, Pandamaran	Malaysia by 16 runs
WT20I 1781	14 February	Kuwait	Amna Tariq	Nepal	Indu Barma	UKM-YSD Cricket Oval, Bangi	Nepal by 8 wickets (DLS)
WT20I 1782	16 February	Thailand	Naruemol Chaiwai	United Arab Emirates	Esha Oza	Bayuemas Oval, Pandamaran	United Arab Emirates by 4 runs
WT20I 1783	16 February	Malaysia	Winifred Duraisingam	Nepal	Indu Barma	Bayuemas Oval, Pandamaran	Malaysia by 4 wickets
WT20I 1784	18 February	Malaysia	Winifred Duraisingam	United Arab Emirates	Esha Oza	Bayuemas Oval, Pandamaran	United Arab Emirates by 37 runs

=== 2024 Thailand Quadrangular Series ===
Pos	Team	Pld	W	L	NR	Pts	NRR
1	Saudi Arabia	3	3	0	0	6	5.044
2	Thailand	3	2	1	0	4	2.192
3	Maldives	3	1	2	0	2	−2.011
4	Bhutan	3	0	3	0	0	−5.968

Source: ESPNcricinfo

Round-robin
No.	Date	Team 1	Captain 1	Team 2	Captain 2	Venue	Result
T20I 2463	12 February	Thailand	Austin Lazarus	Bhutan	Thinley Jamtsho	Terdthai Cricket Ground, Bangkok	Thailand by 10 wickets
T20I 2464	12 February	Maldives	Hassan Rasheed	Saudi Arabia	Hisham Sheikh	Terdthai Cricket Ground, Bangkok	Saudi Arabia by 98 runs
T20I 2465	13 February	Thailand	Austin Lazarus	Saudi Arabia	Hisham Sheikh	Terdthai Cricket Ground, Bangkok	Saudi Arabia by 5 wickets
T20I 2466	13 February	Bhutan	Thinley Jamtsho	Maldives	Hassan Rasheed	Terdthai Cricket Ground, Bangkok	Maldives by 9 wickets
T20I 2471	15 February	Thailand	Austin Lazarus	Maldives	Hassan Rasheed	Terdthai Cricket Ground, Bangkok	Thailand by 8 wickets
T20I 2473	15 February	Bhutan	Thinley Jamtsho	Saudi Arabia	Hisham Sheikh	Terdthai Cricket Ground, Bangkok	Saudi Arabia by 166 runs
Play-offs
No.	Date	Team 1	Captain 1	Team 2	Captain 2	Venue	Result
T20I 2475	16 February	Thailand	Austin Lazarus	Saudi Arabia	Hisham Sheikh	Terdthai Cricket Ground, Bangkok	Saudi Arabia by 8 wickets
T20I 2477	16 February	Bhutan	Thinley Jamtsho	Maldives	Hassan Rasheed	Terdthai Cricket Ground, Bangkok	Bhutan by 4 wickets

=== 2024 Twenty20 East Asia Cup ===
Pos	Team	Pld	W	L	NR	Pts	NRR
1	Hong Kong	4	4	0	0	8	4.075
2	Japan	4	2	2	0	4	2.089
3	China	4	0	4	0	0	−6.121

Source: ESPNcricinfo

Round-robin
No.	Date	Team 1	Captain 1	Team 2	Captain 2	Venue	Result
T20I 2468	14 February	Hong Kong	Nizakat Khan	China	Wei Guo Lei	Mission Road Ground, Mong Kok	Hong Kong by 123 runs
T20I 2469	14 February	Hong Kong	Nizakat Khan	Japan	Kendel Kadowaki-Fleming	Mission Road Ground, Mong Kok	Hong Kong by 7 wickets
T20I 2470	15 February	China	Wei Guo Lei	Japan	Kendel Kadowaki-Fleming	Mission Road Ground, Mong Kok	Japan by 180 runs
T20I 2472	15 February	Hong Kong	Nizakat Khan	Japan	Kendel Kadowaki-Fleming	Mission Road Ground, Mong Kok	Hong Kong by 27 runs
T20I 2474	16 February	Hong Kong	Nizakat Khan	China	Wei Guo Lei	Mission Road Ground, Mong Kok	Hong Kong by 10 wickets
T20I 2476	16 February	China	Wei Guo Lei	Japan	Reo Sakurano-Thomas	Mission Road Ground, Mong Kok	Japan by 44 runs
Final
No.	Date	Team 1	Captain 1	Team 2	Captain 2	Venue	Result
T20I 2478	17 February	Hong Kong	Nizakat Khan	Japan	Kendel Kadowaki-Fleming	Mission Road Ground, Mong Kok	Hong Kong by 34 runs

=== 2024 Nigeria Invitational Women's T20I Tournament ===
Pos	Team	Pld	W	L	T	NR	Pts	NRR
1	Tanzania	6	5	1	0	0	10	2.867
2	Nigeria	6	4	2	0	0	8	0.026
3	Rwanda	6	3	3	0	0	6	0.715
4	Sierra Leone	6	0	6	0	0	0	−4.291

Source: ESPNcricinfo

Round-robin
No.	Date	Team 1	Captain 1	Team 2	Captain 2	Venue	Result
WT20I 1785	25 February	Rwanda	Marie Bimenyimana	Tanzania	Neema Pius	Tafawa Balewa Square Cricket Oval, Lagos	Rwanda by 33 runs
WT20I 1786	25 February	Nigeria	Blessing Etim	Sierra Leone	Fatmata Parkinson	Tafawa Balewa Square Cricket Oval, Lagos	Nigeria by 60 runs
WT20I 1787	26 February	Nigeria	Blessing Etim	Tanzania	Neema Pius	Tafawa Balewa Square Cricket Oval, Lagos	Tanzania by 49 runs
WT20I 1788	26 February	Rwanda	Marie Bimenyimana	Sierra Leone	Fatmata Parkinson	Tafawa Balewa Square Cricket Oval, Lagos	Rwanda by 10 wickets
WT20I 1789	28 February	Nigeria	Blessing Etim	Rwanda	Marie Bimenyimana	Tafawa Balewa Square Cricket Oval, Lagos	Nigeria by 5 wickets
WT20I 1790	28 February	Sierra Leone	Fatu Pessima	Tanzania	Neema Pius	Tafawa Balewa Square Cricket Oval, Lagos	Tanzania by 98 runs
WT20I 1791	29 February	Rwanda	Marie Bimenyimana	Tanzania	Neema Pius	Tafawa Balewa Square Cricket Oval, Lagos	Tanzania by 73 runs
WT20I 1792	29 February	Nigeria	Blessing Etim	Sierra Leone	Fatmata Parkinson	Tafawa Balewa Square Cricket Oval, Lagos	Nigeria by 5 wickets
WT20I 1793	2 March	Rwanda	Marie Bimenyimana	Sierra Leone	Fatmata Parkinson	Tafawa Balewa Square Cricket Oval, Lagos	Rwanda by 8 wickets
WT20I 1794	2 March	Nigeria	Blessing Etim	Tanzania	Neema Pius	Tafawa Balewa Square Cricket Oval, Lagos	Tanzania by 65 runs
WT20I 1795	3 March	Sierra Leone	Zainab Kamara	Tanzania	Neema Pius	Tafawa Balewa Square Cricket Oval, Lagos	Tanzania by 92 runs
WT20I 1796	3 March	Nigeria	Blessing Etim	Rwanda	Marie Bimenyimana	Tafawa Balewa Square Cricket Oval, Lagos	Nigeria by 20 runs

=== 2024 Nepal T20I Tri-Nation Series ===
Pos	Team	Pld	W	L	NR	Pts	NRR
1	Netherlands	4	2	1	1	5	0.310
2	Nepal	4	2	2	0	4	0.293
3	Namibia	4	1	2	1	3	−0.700

Source: ESPNcricinfo

Round-robin
No.	Date	Team 1	Captain 1	Team 2	Captain 2	Venue	Result
T20I 2485	27 February	Nepal	Rohit Paudel	Namibia	JJ Smit	Tribhuvan University International Cricket Ground, Kirtipur	Namibia by 20 runs
T20I 2487	28 February	Nepal	Rohit Paudel	Netherlands	Scott Edwards	Tribhuvan University International Cricket Ground, Kirtipur	Netherlands by 2 runs
T20I 2488	29 February	Namibia	JJ Smit	Netherlands	Scott Edwards	Tribhuvan University International Cricket Ground, Kirtipur	Netherlands by 59 runs
T20I 2490	1 March	Nepal	Rohit Paudel	Namibia	JJ Smit	Tribhuvan University International Cricket Ground, Kirtipur	Nepal by 3 runs
T20I 2492	2 March	Nepal	Rohit Paudel	Netherlands	Scott Edwards	Tribhuvan University International Cricket Ground, Kirtipur	Nepal by 6 wickets
T20I 2493	3 March	Namibia	Gerhard Erasmus	Netherlands	Scott Edwards	Tribhuvan University International Cricket Ground, Kirtipur	No result
Final
No.	Date	Team 1	Captain 1	Team 2	Captain 2	Venue	Result
T20I 2497	5 March	Nepal	Rohit Paudel	Netherlands	Scott Edwards	Tribhuvan University International Cricket Ground, Kirtipur	Netherlands by 4 wickets

=== Hong Kong in Qatar ===
T20I series
No.	Date	Home captain	Away captain	Venue	Result
T20I 2486	27 February	Muhammad Tanveer	Nizakat Khan	UDST Cricket Ground, Doha	Hong Kong by 10 runs
T20I 2489	29 February	Muhammad Tanveer	Nizakat Khan	West End Park International Cricket Stadium, Doha	Qatar by 4 wickets
T20I 2491	1 March	Muhammad Tanveer	Nizakat Khan	West End Park International Cricket Stadium, Doha	Match tied (Hong Kong won S/O)

== March ==
=== 2024 Malaysia Open T20 Championship ===
Pos	Team	Pld	W	L	NR	Pts	NRR
1	Bahrain	4	4	0	0	8	2.220
2	Malaysia	4	3	1	0	6	1.402
3	Kuwait	4	2	2	0	4	−0.010
4	Vanuatu	4	1	3	0	2	−1.903
5	Tanzania	4	0	4	0	0	−1.517

Source: ESPNcricinfo

Round-robin
No.	Date	Team 1	Captain 1	Team 2	Captain 2	Venue	Result
T20I 2495	5 March	Tanzania	Salum Jumbe	Vanuatu	Joshua Rasu	Bayuemas Oval, Pandamaran	Vanuatu by 9 runs
T20I 2496	5 March	Bahrain	Haider Butt	Kuwait	Mohammed Aslam	Bayuemas Oval, Pandamaran	Bahrain by 28 runs (DLS)
T20I 2498	6 March	Kuwait	Mohammed Aslam	Tanzania	Salum Jumbe	Bayuemas Oval, Pandamaran	Kuwait by 5 wickets
T20I 2499	6 March	Malaysia	Ahmad Faiz	Vanuatu	Joshua Rasu	Bayuemas Oval, Pandamaran	Malaysia by 52 runs
T20I 2502	7 March	Malaysia	Ahmad Faiz	Bahrain	Haider Butt	Bayuemas Oval, Pandamaran	Bahrain by 9 wickets
T20I 2503	7 March	Kuwait	Mohammed Aslam	Vanuatu	Joshua Rasu	Bayuemas Oval, Pandamaran	Kuwait by 8 wickets
T20I 2506	9 March	Malaysia	Ahmad Faiz	Kuwait	Mohammed Aslam	Bayuemas Oval, Pandamaran	Malaysia by 7 wickets
T20I 2508	9 March	Bahrain	Haider Butt	Tanzania	Salum Jumbe	Bayuemas Oval, Pandamaran	Bahrain by 52 runs
T20I 2510	10 March	Bahrain	Haider Butt	Vanuatu	Joshua Rasu	Bayuemas Oval, Pandamaran	Bahrain by 56 runs
T20I 2512	10 March	Malaysia	Ahmad Faiz	Tanzania	Salum Jumbe	Bayuemas Oval, Pandamaran	Malaysia by 6 wickets
Play-offs
T20I 2513	11 March	Kuwait	Mohammed Aslam	Vanuatu	Joshua Rasu	Bayuemas Oval, Pandamaran	Kuwait by 7 wickets
T20I 2514	11 March	Malaysia	Ahmad Faiz	Bahrain	Haider Butt	Bayuemas Oval, Pandamaran	Bahrain by 8 wickets

=== Papua New Guinea in Oman ===
T20I series
No.	Date	Home captain	Away captain	Venue	Result
T20I 2500	6 March	Zeeshan Maqsood	Assad Vala	Oman Cricket Academy Ground Turf 1, Muscat	Oman by 3 wickets
T20I 2504	7 March	Zeeshan Maqsood	Assad Vala	Oman Cricket Academy Ground Turf 1, Muscat	Papua New Guinea by 8 wickets
T20I 2505	8 March	Zeeshan Maqsood	Assad Vala	Oman Cricket Academy Ground Turf 1, Muscat	Oman by 4 wickets

=== 2023 African Games ===
==== Women's tournament ====
Pos	Team	Pld	W	L	NR	Pts	NRR
1	South Africa Emerging	3	2	1	0	4	1.887
2	Nigeria	3	1	1	1	3	0.778
3	Tanzania	3	1	1	1	3	−1.130
4	Namibia	3	1	2	0	2	−1.421

Source: ESPNcricinfo

Pos	Team	Pld	W	L	NR	Pts	NRR
1	Zimbabwe	3	3	0	0	6	1.438
2	Uganda	3	2	1	0	4	0.529
3	Kenya	3	1	2	0	2	−1.018
4	Rwanda	3	0	3	0	0	−0.975

Source: ESPNcricinfo

Round-robin
No.	Date	Team 1	Captain 1	Team 2	Captain 2	Venue	Result
1st Match	7 March	Namibia	Yasmeen Khan	South Africa Emerging	Nondumiso Shangase	Achimota Oval A, Accra	Namibia by 1 run (DLS)
WT20I 1797	7 March	Nigeria	Blessing Etim	Tanzania	Neema Pius	Achimota Oval B, Accra	No result
WT20I 1798	7 March	Rwanda	Marie Bimenyimana	Zimbabwe	Mary-Anne Musonda	Achimota Oval A, Accra	Zimbabwe by 7 wickets
WT20I 1799	7 March	Kenya	Esther Wachira	Uganda	Concy Aweko	Achimota Oval B, Accra	Uganda by 6 wickets
5th Match	8 March	South Africa Emerging	Nondumiso Shangase	Tanzania	Neema Pius	Achimota Oval A, Accra	South Africa by 8 wickets
WT20I 1800	8 March	Namibia	Yasmeen Khan	Nigeria	Blessing Etim	Achimota Oval B, Accra	Nigeria by 55 runs
WT20I 1801	8 March	Uganda	Concy Aweko	Zimbabwe	Mary-Anne Musonda	Achimota Oval A, Accra	Zimbabwe by 4 wickets
WT20I 1802	8 March	Kenya	Esther Wachira	Rwanda	Marie Bimenyimana	Achimota Oval B, Accra	Kenya by 7 wickets
WT20I 1803	10 March	Namibia	Yasmeen Khan	Tanzania	Neema Pius	Achimota Oval A, Accra	Tanzania by 1 wicket
10th Match	10 March	Nigeria	Blessing Etim	South Africa Emerging	Nondumiso Shangase	Achimota Oval B, Accra	South Africa by 4 wickets
WT20I 1804	10 March	Kenya	Esther Wachira	Zimbabwe	Mary-Anne Musonda	Achimota Oval A, Accra	Zimbabwe by 68 runs
WT20I 1805	10 March	Rwanda	Marie Bimenyimana	Uganda	Concy Aweko	Achimota Oval B, Accra	Uganda by 30 runs
Play-offs
No.	Date	Team 1	Captain 1	Team 2	Captain 2	Venue	Result
13th Match	11 March	South Africa Emerging	Nondumiso Shangase	Uganda	Concy Aweko	Achimota Oval A, Accra	South Africa by 50 runs
WT20I 1806	11 March	Nigeria	Blessing Etim	Zimbabwe	Mary-Anne Musonda	Achimota Oval A, Accra	Zimbabwe by 5 wickets
WT20I 1807	13 March	Nigeria	Blessing Etim	Uganda	Concy Aweko	Achimota Oval A, Accra	Nigeria by 3 wickets
16th Match	13 March	South Africa Emerging	Nondumiso Shangase	Zimbabwe	Mary-Anne Musonda	Achimota Oval A, Accra	Match tied (Zimbabwe won S/O)

==== Men's tournament ====
Pos	Team	Pld	W	L	NR	Pts	NRR
1	Uganda	3	3	0	0	6	3.283
2	Kenya	3	2	1	0	4	1.049
3	University Sports South Africa	3	1	2	0	2	1.000
4	Ghana	3	0	3	0	0	−5.888

Source: ESPNcricinfo

Pos	Team	Pld	W	L	NR	Pts	NRR
1	Zimbabwe Emerging	3	3	0	0	6	1.600
2	Namibia	3	1	2	0	2	0.195
3	Tanzania	3	1	2	0	2	−0.220
4	Nigeria	3	1	2	0	2	−1.158

Source: ESPNcricinfo

Round-robin
No.	Date	Team 1	Captain 1	Team 2	Captain 2	Venue	Result
1st Match	17 March	Namibia	Jan Nicol Loftie-Eaton	Zimbabwe Emerging	Clive Madande	Achimota Oval A, Accra	Zimbabwe Emerging by 35 runs
T20I 2524	17 March	Nigeria	Sylvester Okpe	Tanzania	Salum Jumbe	Achimota Oval B, Accra	Tanzania by 47 runs
3rd Match	17 March	Ghana	Obed Harvey	University Sports South Africa	George van Heerden	Achimota Oval A, Accra	University Sports South Africa by 134 runs
T20I 2525	17 March	Kenya	Rakep Patel	Uganda	Brian Masaba	Achimota Oval B, Accra	Uganda by 72 runs
5th Match	18 March	Tanzania	Salum Jumbe	Zimbabwe Emerging	Clive Madande	Achimota Oval A, Accra	Zimbabwe Emerging by 4 wickets
T20I 2527	18 March	Namibia	Jan Nicol Loftie-Eaton	Nigeria	Sylvester Okpe	Achimota Oval B, Accra	Nigeria by 3 wickets
7th Match	18 March	Kenya	Rakep Patel	University Sports South Africa	George van Heerden	Achimota Oval A, Accra	Kenya by 70 runs
T20I 2528	18 March	Ghana	Obed Harvey	Uganda	Brian Masaba	Achimota Oval B, Accra	Uganda by 121 runs
9th Match	20 March	University Sports South Africa	George van Heerden	Uganda	Brian Masaba	Achimota Oval A, Accra	Uganda by 2 wickets
T20I 2530	20 March	Ghana	Obed Harvey	Kenya	Rakep Patel	Achimota Oval B, Accra	Kenya by 7 wickets
11th Match	20 March	Nigeria	Sylvester Okpe	Zimbabwe Emerging	Clive Madande	Achimota Oval A, Accra	Zimbabwe Emerging by 10 wickets
T20I 2531	20 March	Namibia	Malan Kruger	Tanzania	Salum Jumbe	Achimota Oval B, Accra	Namibia by 7 wickets
Play-offs
No.	Date	Team 1	Captain 1	Team 2	Captain 2	Venue	Result
T20I 2532	21 March	Namibia	Malan Kruger	Uganda	Kenneth Waiswa	Achimota Oval A, Accra	Namibia by 24 runs
14 Match	21 March	Kenya	Rakep Patel	Zimbabwe Emerging	Clive Madande	Achimota Oval A, Accra	Zimbabwe Emerging by 72 runs
T20I 2533	23 March	Kenya	Rakep Patel	Uganda	Kenneth Waiswa	Achimota Oval A, Accra	Uganda by 106 runs
16th Match	23 March	Namibia	Malan Kruger	Zimbabwe Emerging	Clive Madande	Achimota Oval A, Accra	Zimbabwe Emerging by 8 wickets

=== Nepal in Hong Kong ===
T20I match
No.	Date	Home captain	Away captain	Venue	Result
T20I 2507	9 March	Nizakat Khan	Rohit Paudel	Mission Road Ground, Mong Kok	Hong Kong won by 73 runs

=== 2024 Hong Kong Tri-Nation Series ===
Pos	Team	Pld	W	L	NR	Pts	NRR
1	Nepal	2	1	0	1	3	4.250
2	Papua New Guinea	2	1	1	0	2	−0.720
3	Hong Kong	2	0	1	1	1	−3.739

Source: ESPNcricinfo

Round-robin
No.	Date	Team 1	Captain 1	Team 2	Captain 2	Venue	Result
T20I 2511	10 March	Hong Kong	Nizakat Khan	Nepal	Rohit Paudel	Mission Road Ground, Mong Kok	No result
T20I 2516	12 March	Nepal	Rohit Paudel	Papua New Guinea	Assad Vala	Mission Road Ground, Mong Kok	Nepal by 85 runs
T20I 2517	12 March	Hong Kong	Nizakat Khan	Papua New Guinea	Assad Vala	Mission Road Ground, Mong Kok	Papua New Guinea by 10 wickets
Final
No.	Date	Team 1	Captain 1	Team 2	Captain 2	Venue	Result
T20I 2518	13 March	Nepal	Rohit Paudel	Papua New Guinea	Assad Vala	Mission Road Ground, Mong Kok	Papua New Guinea by 86 runs

=== Scotland in the United Arab Emirates ===
T20I series
No.	Date	Home captain	Away captain	Venue	Result
T20I 2515	11 March	Muhammad Waseem	Richie Berrington	Dubai International Cricket Stadium, Dubai	United Arab Emirates by 8 wickets
T20I 2519	13 March	Muhammad Waseem	Matthew Cross	Dubai International Cricket Stadium, Dubai	Scotland by 9 runs
T20I 2520	14 March	Muhammad Waseem	Richie Berrington	Dubai International Cricket Stadium, Dubai	Scotland by 32 runs

=== Papua New Guinea in Malaysia ===
T20I series
No.	Date	Home captain	Away captain	Venue	Result
T20I 2522	16 March	Virandeep Singh	Tony Ura	Bayuemas Oval, Pandamaran	Papua New Guinea by 77 runs
T20I 2523	17 March	Virandeep Singh	Norman Vanua	Bayuemas Oval, Pandamaran	Malaysia by 63 runs

=== Lesotho in Eswatini ===
T20I series
No.	Date	Home captain	Away captain	Venue	Result
T20I 2534	29 March	Adil Butt	Chachole Tlali	Malkerns Country Club Oval, Malkerns	Eswatini by 55 runs
T20I 2535	29 March	Adil Butt	Chachole Tlali	Malkerns Country Club Oval, Malkerns	Lesotho by 6 wickets
T20I 2536	30 March	Adil Butt	Chachole Tlali	Malkerns Country Club Oval, Malkerns	Lesotho by 8 wickets
T20I 2537	30 March	Adil Butt	Chachole Tlali	Malkerns Country Club Oval, Malkerns	Eswatini by 39 runs
T20I 2538	31 March	Adil Butt	Chachole Tlali	Malkerns Country Club Oval, Malkerns	Eswatini by 3 wickets

== See also ==
- International cricket in 2023–24
