= International cricket in 2023–24 =

International cricket season

The 2023–24 international cricket season included series from late September 2023 to March 2024. This calendar included men's Test, men's One Day International (ODI), men's Twenty20 International (T20I), women's Test, women's One Day International (ODI) and women's Twenty20 International (T20I) matches, as well as some other significant series. The men's and women's T20Is in this page were mostly between full-members. The 2023 Cricket World Cup took place in India in October and November. In addition to the matches shown here, a number of other T20I series involving associate nations were played during this period.

== Season overview ==
International tours
Start date	Home team	Away team	Results [Matches]		
Start date	Home team	Away team	Test	ODI	T20I
21 September 2023	Bangladesh	New Zealand	1–1 [2]	0–2 [3]	—N/a
22 September 2023	India	Australia	—N/a	2–1 [3]	4–1 [5]
24 October 2023	Namibia	Zimbabwe	—N/a	—N/a	3–2 [5]
3 December 2023	West Indies	England	—N/a	2–1 [3]	3–2 [5]
7 December 2023	Zimbabwe	Ireland	—N/a	0–2 [3]	1–2 [3]
10 December 2023	South Africa	India	1–1 [2]	1–2 [3]	1–1 [3]
14 December 2023	Australia	Pakistan	3–0 [3]	—N/a	—N/a
17 December 2023	New Zealand	Bangladesh	—N/a	2–1 [3]	1–1 [3]
29 December 2023	United Arab Emirates	Afghanistan	—N/a	—N/a	1–2 [3]
6 January 2024	Sri Lanka	Zimbabwe	—N/a	2–0 [3]	2–1 [3]
11 January 2024	India	Afghanistan	—N/a	—N/a	3–0 [3]
12 January 2024	New Zealand	Pakistan	—N/a	—N/a	4–1 [5]
17 January 2024	Australia	West Indies	1–1 [2]	3–0 [3]	2–1 [3]
25 January 2024	India	England	4–1 [5]	—N/a	—N/a
2 February 2024	Sri Lanka	Afghanistan	1–0 [1]	3–0 [3]	2–1 [3]
4 February 2024	New Zealand	South Africa	2–0 [2]	—N/a	—N/a
8 February 2024	Nepal	Canada	—N/a	3–0 [3]	—N/a
21 February 2024	New Zealand	Australia	0–2 [2]	—N/a	0–3 [3]
28 February 2024	(United Arab Emirates) Afghanistan	Ireland	0–1 [1]	2–0 [3]	2–1 [3]
4 March 2024	Bangladesh	Sri Lanka	0–2 [2]	2–1 [3]	1–2 [3]
International tournaments
Start date	Tournament				Winners
27 September 2023	(China) 2022 Asian Games				India
5 October 2023	(India) 2023 Cricket World Cup				Australia
19 January 2024	(South Africa) 2024 Under-19 Cricket World Cup				Australia
15 February 2024	2024 Nepal Tri-Nation Series (round 1)				—N/a
22 February 2024	(Malaysia) 2024 ICC Cricket World Cup Challenge League Play-off				Kuwait
28 February 2024	2024 United Arab Emirates Tri-Nation Series (round 2)				—N/a

Women's international tours
Start date	Home team	Away team	Results [Matches]		
Start date	Home team	Away team	Test	ODI	T20I
24 September 2023	South Africa	New Zealand	—	2–1 [3]	1–1 [5]
1 October 2023	Australia	West Indies	—	2–0 [3]	2–1 [3]
17 October 2023	(Spain) Ireland	Scotland	—	2–1 [3]	1–1 [2]
25 October 2023	Bangladesh	Pakistan	—	2–1 [3]	2–1 [3]
3 December 2023	New Zealand	Pakistan	—	2–1 [3]	1–2 [3]
3 December 2023	South Africa	Bangladesh	—	2–1 [3]	1–1 [3]
6 December 2023	India	England	1–0 [1]	—	1–2 [3]
21 December 2023	India	Australia	1–0 [1]	0–3 [3]	1–2 [3]
18 January 2024	Zimbabwe	Ireland	—	0–2 [3]	0–5 [5]
27 January 2024	Australia	South Africa	1–0 [1]	2–1 [3]	2–1 [3]
19 March 2024	New Zealand	England	—	1–2 [3]	1–4 [5]
21 March 2024	Bangladesh	Australia	—	0–3 [3]	0–3 [3]
24 March 2024	Zimbabwe	Papua New Guinea	—	3–0 [3]	2–1 [3]
27 March 2024	South Africa	Sri Lanka	—	1–1 [3]	1–2 [3]
International tournaments
Start date	Tournament				Winners
19 September 2023	(China) 2022 Asian Games				India

== September ==
=== Asian Games ===
==== Women's tournament ====
Preliminary round
No.	Date	Team 1	Captain 1	Team 2	Captain 2	Venue	Result
WT20I 1663	19 September	Indonesia	Ni Wayan Sariani	Mongolia	Tsendsuren Ariuntsetseg	ZJUT Cricket Field, Hangzhou	Indonesia by 172 runs
WT20I 1664	19 September	Hong Kong	Kary Chan	Malaysia	Winifred Duraisingam	ZJUT Cricket Field, Hangzhou	Malaysia by 22 runs
WT20I 1665	20 September	Hong Kong	Kary Chan	Mongolia	Tsendsuren Ariuntsetseg	ZJUT Cricket Field, Hangzhou	Hong Kong by 180 runs
Quarter-finals
No.	Date	Team 1	Captain 1	Team 2	Captain 2	Venue	Result
WT20I 1666	21 September	India	Smriti Mandhana	Malaysia	Winifred Duraisingam	ZJUT Cricket Field, Hangzhou	No result
WT20I 1666a	21 September	Indonesia	Ni Wayan Sariani	Pakistan	Nida Dar	ZJUT Cricket Field, Hangzhou	Match abandoned
WT20I 1667	22 September	Sri Lanka	Chamari Athapaththu	Thailand	Naruemol Chaiwai	ZJUT Cricket Field, Hangzhou	Sri Lanka by 8 wickets
WT20I 1667a	22 September	Bangladesh	Nigar Sultana	Hong Kong	Kary Chan	ZJUT Cricket Field, Hangzhou	Match abandoned
Semi-finals
No.	Date	Team 1	Captain 1	Team 2	Captain 2	Venue	Result
WT20I 1668	24 September	India	Smriti Mandhana	Bangladesh	Nigar Sultana	ZJUT Cricket Field, Hangzhou	India by 8 wickets
WT20I 1669	24 September	Pakistan	Nida Dar	Sri Lanka	Chamari Athapaththu	ZJUT Cricket Field, Hangzhou	Sri Lanka by 6 wickets
Bronze medal match
No.	Date	Team 1	Captain 1	Team 2	Captain 2	Venue	Result
WT20I 1670	25 September	Bangladesh	Nigar Sultana	Pakistan	Nida Dar	ZJUT Cricket Field, Hangzhou	Bangladesh by 5 wickets
Gold medal match
No.	Date	Team 1	Captain 1	Team 2	Captain 2	Venue	Result
WT20I 1671	25 September	India	Harmanpreet Kaur	Sri Lanka	Chamari Athapaththu	ZJUT Cricket Field, Hangzhou	India by 19 runs

==== Men's tournament ====
Group stage
No.	Date	Team 1	Captain 1	Team 2	Captain 2	Venue	Result
T20I 2255	27 September	Mongolia	Luvsanzundui Erdenebulgan	Nepal	Rohit Paudel	ZJUT Cricket Field, Hangzhou	Nepal by 273 runs
T20I 2256	27 September	Cambodia	Luqman Butt	Japan	Kendel Kadowaki-Fleming	ZJUT Cricket Field, Hangzhou	Japan by 3 wickets
T20I 2257	28 September	Malaysia	Ahmad Faiz	Singapore	Rezza Gaznavi	ZJUT Cricket Field, Hangzhou	Malaysia by 73 runs
T20I 2258	28 September	Maldives	Hassan Rasheed	Mongolia	Luvsanzundui Erdenebulgan	ZJUT Cricket Field, Hangzhou	Maldives by 9 wickets
T20I 2261	29 September	Cambodia	Luqman Butt	Hong Kong	Nizakat Khan	ZJUT Cricket Field, Hangzhou	Hong Kong by 9 wickets
T20I 2262	29 September	Singapore	Rezza Gaznavi	Thailand	Nopphon Senamontree	ZJUT Cricket Field, Hangzhou	Singapore by 99 runs
T20I 2269	1 October	Maldives	Hassan Rasheed	Nepal	Rohit Paudel	ZJUT Cricket Field, Hangzhou	Nepal by 138 runs
T20I 2270	1 October	Hong Kong	Nizakat Khan	Japan	Kendel Kadowaki-Fleming	ZJUT Cricket Field, Hangzhou	Hong Kong by 5 wickets
T20I 2275	2 October	Malaysia	Ahmad Faiz	Thailand	Nopphon Senamontree	ZJUT Cricket Field, Hangzhou	Malaysia by 194 runs
Quarter-finals
No.	Date	Team 1	Captain 1	Team 2	Captain 2	Venue	Result
T20I 2278	3 October	India	Ruturaj Gaikwad	Nepal	Rohit Paudel	ZJUT Cricket Field, Hangzhou	India by 23 runs
T20I 2279	3 October	Hong Kong	Nizakat Khan	Pakistan	Qasim Akram	ZJUT Cricket Field, Hangzhou	Pakistan by 68 runs
T20I 2282	4 October	Afghanistan	Gulbadin Naib	Sri Lanka	Sahan Arachchige	ZJUT Cricket Field, Hangzhou	Afghanistan by 8 runs
T20I 2283	4 October	Bangladesh	Saif Hassan	Malaysia	Ahmad Faiz	ZJUT Cricket Field, Hangzhou	Bangladesh by 2 runs
Semi-finals
No.	Date	Team 1	Captain 1	Team 2	Captain 2	Venue	Result
T20I 2296	6 October	Bangladesh	Saif Hassan	India	Ruturaj Gaikwad	ZJUT Cricket Field, Hangzhou	India by 9 wickets
T20I 2297	6 October	Afghanistan	Gulbadin Naib	Pakistan	Qasim Akram	ZJUT Cricket Field, Hangzhou	Afghanistan by 4 wickets
Bronze medal match
No.	Date	Team 1	Captain 1	Team 2	Captain 2	Venue	Result
T20I 2300	7 October	Bangladesh	Saif Hassan	Pakistan	Qasim Akram	ZJUT Cricket Field, Hangzhou	Bangladesh by 6 wickets (DLS)
Gold medal match
No.	Date	Team 1	Captain 1	Team 2	Captain 2	Venue	Result
T20I 2301	7 October	Afghanistan	Gulbadin Naib	India	Ruturaj Gaikwad	ZJUT Cricket Field, Hangzhou	No result

=== New Zealand in Bangladesh ===
ODI series
No.	Date	Home captain	Away captain	Venue	Result
ODI 4650	21 September	Liton Das	Lockie Ferguson	Sher-e-Bangla National Cricket Stadium, Dhaka	No result
ODI 4652	23 September	Liton Das	Lockie Ferguson	Sher-e-Bangla National Cricket Stadium, Dhaka	New Zealand by 86 runs
ODI 4655	26 September	Najmul Hossain Shanto	Lockie Ferguson	Sher-e-Bangla National Cricket Stadium, Dhaka	New Zealand by 7 wickets
2023–2025 ICC World Test Championship – Test series
No.	Date	Home captain	Away captain	Venue	Result
Test 2516	28 November – 2 December	Najmul Hossain Shanto	Tim Southee	Sylhet International Cricket Stadium, Sylhet	Bangladesh by 150 runs
Test 2517	6–10 December	Najmul Hossain Shanto	Tim Southee	Sher-e-Bangla National Cricket Stadium, Dhaka	New Zealand by 4 wickets

=== Australia in India ===
ODI series
No.	Date	Home captain	Away captain	Venue	Result
ODI 4651	22 September	KL Rahul	Pat Cummins	I. S. Bindra Stadium, Mohali	India by 5 wickets
ODI 4654	24 September	KL Rahul	Steve Smith	Holkar Stadium, Indore	India by 99 runs (DLS)
ODI 4657	27 September	Rohit Sharma	Pat Cummins	Niranjan Shah Stadium, Rajkot	Australia by 66 runs
T20I series
No.	Date	Home captain	Away captain	Venue	Result
T20I 2360	23 November	Suryakumar Yadav	Matthew Wade	ACA–VDCA Cricket Stadium, Visakhapatnam	India by 2 wickets
T20I 2367	26 November	Suryakumar Yadav	Matthew Wade	Greenfield International Stadium, Thiruvananthapuram	India by 44 runs
T20I 2372	28 November	Suryakumar Yadav	Matthew Wade	Assam Cricket Association Stadium, Guwahati	Australia by 5 wickets
T20I 2379	1 December	Suryakumar Yadav	Matthew Wade	Shaheed Veer Narayan Singh International Cricket Stadium, Raipur	India by 20 runs
T20I 2380	3 December	Suryakumar Yadav	Matthew Wade	M. Chinnaswamy Stadium, Bengaluru	India by 6 runs

=== New Zealand women in South Africa ===
2022–2025 ICC Women's Championship – WODI series
No.	Date	Home captain	Away captain	Venue	Result
WODI 1339	24 September	Laura Wolvaardt	Sophie Devine	JB Marks Oval, Potchefstroom	South Africa by 4 wickets
WODI 1340	28 September	Laura Wolvaardt	Sophie Devine	City Oval, Pietermaritzburg	South Africa by 7 wickets
WODI 1341	1 October	Laura Wolvaardt	Sophie Devine	Kingsmead, Durban	New Zealand by 6 wickets
WT20I series
No.	Date	Home captain	Away captain	Venue	Result
WT20I 1680a	6 October	Laura Wolvaardt	Sophie Devine	Buffalo Park, East London	Match abandoned
WT20I 1681	8 October	Laura Wolvaardt	Sophie Devine	Buffalo Park, East London	No result
WT20I 1681a	10 October	Laura Wolvaardt	Sophie Devine	Buffalo Park, East London	Match abandoned
WT20I 1683	14 October	Laura Wolvaardt	Sophie Devine	Willowmoore Park, Benoni	New Zealand by 8 wickets
WT20I 1685	15 October	Laura Wolvaardt	Sophie Devine	Willowmoore Park, Benoni	South Africa by 11 runs

== October ==
=== West Indies women in Australia ===
WT20I series
No.	Date	Home captain	Away captain	Venue	Result
WT20I 1676	1 October	Alyssa Healy	Hayley Matthews	North Sydney Oval, Sydney	Australia by 8 wickets
WT20I 1678	2 October	Alyssa Healy	Hayley Matthews	North Sydney Oval, Sydney	West Indies by 7 wickets
WT20I 1680	5 October	Alyssa Healy	Hayley Matthews	Allan Border Field, Brisbane	Australia by 47 runs
2022–2025 ICC Women's Championship — WODI series
No.	Date	Home captain	Away captain	Venue	Result
WODI 1342	8 October	Alyssa Healy	Shemaine Campbelle	Allan Border Field, Brisbane	Australia by 8 wickets
WODI 1343	12 October	Alyssa Healy	Hayley Matthews	Junction Oval, Melbourne	No result
WODI 1344	14 October	Alyssa Healy	Hayley Matthews	Junction Oval, Melbourne	Australia by 8 wickets

=== 2023 Cricket World Cup ===
Pos	Team	Pld	W	L	T	NR	Pts	NRR	Qualification
1	India (H, R)	9	9	0	0	0	18	2.570	Advanced to the semi-finals and qualified for the 2025 ICC Champions Trophy
2	South Africa	9	7	2	0	0	14	1.261	Advanced to the semi-finals and qualified for the 2025 ICC Champions Trophy
3	Australia (C)	9	7	2	0	0	14	0.841	Advanced to the semi-finals and qualified for the 2025 ICC Champions Trophy
4	New Zealand	9	5	4	0	0	10	0.743	Advanced to the semi-finals and qualified for the 2025 ICC Champions Trophy
5	Pakistan	9	4	5	0	0	8	−0.199	Qualified for the 2025 ICC Champions Trophy
6	Afghanistan	9	4	5	0	0	8	−0.336	Qualified for the 2025 ICC Champions Trophy
7	England	9	3	6	0	0	6	−0.572	Qualified for the 2025 ICC Champions Trophy
8	Bangladesh	9	2	7	0	0	4	−1.087	Qualified for the 2025 ICC Champions Trophy
9	Sri Lanka	9	2	7	0	0	4	−1.419	
10	Netherlands	9	2	7	0	0	4	−1.825	

Source: ESPNcricinfo
(C) Champions; (H) Host; (R) Runners-up

2023 Cricket World Cup
No.	Date	Team 1	Captain 1	Team 2	Captain 2	Venue	Result
ODI 4658	5 October	England	Jos Buttler	New Zealand	Tom Latham	Narendra Modi Stadium, Ahmedabad	New Zealand by 9 wickets
ODI 4659	6 October	Netherlands	Scott Edwards	Pakistan	Babar Azam	Rajiv Gandhi International Cricket Stadium, Hyderabad	Pakistan by 81 runs
ODI 4660	7 October	Afghanistan	Hashmatullah Shahidi	Bangladesh	Shakib Al Hasan	Himachal Pradesh Cricket Association Stadium, Dharamshala	Bangladesh by 6 wickets
ODI 4661	7 October	South Africa	Temba Bavuma	Sri Lanka	Dasun Shanaka	Arun Jaitley Cricket Stadium, Delhi	South Africa by 102 runs
ODI 4662	8 October	Australia	Pat Cummins	India	Rohit Sharma	M. A. Chidambaram Stadium, Chennai	India by 6 wickets
ODI 4663	9 October	Netherlands	Scott Edwards	New Zealand	Tom Latham	Rajiv Gandhi International Cricket Stadium, Hyderabad	New Zealand by 99 runs
ODI 4664	10 October	Bangladesh	Shakib Al Hasan	England	Jos Buttler	Himachal Pradesh Cricket Association Stadium, Dharamshala	England by 137 runs
ODI 4665	10 October	Pakistan	Babar Azam	Sri Lanka	Dasun Shanaka	Rajiv Gandhi International Cricket Stadium, Hyderabad	Pakistan by 6 wickets
ODI 4666	11 October	Afghanistan	Hashmatullah Shahidi	India	Rohit Sharma	Arun Jaitley Cricket Stadium, Delhi	India by 8 wickets
ODI 4667	12 October	Australia	Pat Cummins	South Africa	Temba Bavuma	Ekana Cricket Stadium, Lucknow	South Africa by 134 runs
ODI 4668	13 October	Bangladesh	Shakib Al Hasan	New Zealand	Kane Williamson	M. A. Chidambaram Stadium, Chennai	New Zealand by 8 wickets
ODI 4669	14 October	India	Rohit Sharma	Pakistan	Babar Azam	Narendra Modi Stadium, Ahmedabad	India by 7 wickets
ODI 4670	15 October	Afghanistan	Hashmatullah Shahidi	England	Jos Buttler	Arun Jaitley Cricket Stadium, Delhi	Afghanistan by 69 runs
ODI 4671	16 October	Australia	Pat Cummins	Sri Lanka	Kusal Mendis	Ekana Cricket Stadium, Lucknow	Australia by 5 wickets
ODI 4672	17 October	Netherlands	Scott Edwards	South Africa	Temba Bavuma	Himachal Pradesh Cricket Association Stadium, Dharamshala	Netherlands by 38 runs
ODI 4673	18 October	Afghanistan	Hashmatullah Shahidi	New Zealand	Tom Latham	M. A. Chidambaram Stadium, Chennai	New Zealand by 149 runs
ODI 4674	19 October	India	Rohit Sharma	Bangladesh	Najmul Hossain Shanto	Maharashtra Cricket Association Stadium, Pune	India by 7 wickets
ODI 4675	20 October	Australia	Pat Cummins	Pakistan	Babar Azam	M. Chinnaswamy Stadium, Bengaluru	Australia by 62 runs
ODI 4676	21 October	Netherlands	Scott Edwards	Sri Lanka	Kusal Mendis	Ekana Cricket Stadium, Lucknow	Sri Lanka by 5 wickets
ODI 4677	21 October	England	Jos Buttler	South Africa	Aiden Markram	Wankhede Stadium, Mumbai	South Africa by 229 runs
ODI 4678	22 October	India	Rohit Sharma	New Zealand	Tom Latham	Himachal Pradesh Cricket Association Stadium, Dharamshala	India by 4 wickets
ODI 4679	23 October	Afghanistan	Hashmatullah Shahidi	Pakistan	Babar Azam	M. A. Chidambaram Stadium, Chennai	Afghanistan by 8 wickets
ODI 4680	24 October	Bangladesh	Shakib Al Hasan	South Africa	Aiden Markram	Wankhede Stadium, Mumbai	South Africa by 149 runs
ODI 4681	25 October	Australia	Pat Cummins	Netherlands	Scott Edwards	Arun Jaitley Cricket Stadium, Delhi	Australia by 309 runs
ODI 4682	26 October	England	Jos Buttler	Sri Lanka	Kusal Mendis	M. Chinnaswamy Stadium, Bengaluru	Sri Lanka by 8 wickets
ODI 4683	27 October	Pakistan	Babar Azam	South Africa	Temba Bavuma	M. A. Chidambaram Stadium, Chennai	South Africa by 1 wicket
ODI 4684	28 October	Australia	Pat Cummins	New Zealand	Tom Latham	Himachal Pradesh Cricket Association Stadium, Dharamshala	Australia by 5 runs
ODI 4685	28 October	Bangladesh	Shakib Al Hasan	Netherlands	Scott Edwards	Eden Gardens, Kolkata	Netherlands by 87 runs
ODI 4686	29 October	India	Rohit Sharma	England	Jos Buttler	Ekana Cricket Stadium, Lucknow	India by 100 runs
ODI 4687	30 October	Afghanistan	Hashmatullah Shahidi	Sri Lanka	Kusal Mendis	Maharashtra Cricket Association Stadium, Pune	Afghanistan by 7 wickets
ODI 4688	31 October	Bangladesh	Shakib Al Hasan	Pakistan	Babar Azam	Eden Gardens, Kolkata	Pakistan by 7 wickets
ODI 4689	1 November	New Zealand	Tom Latham	South Africa	Temba Bavuma	Maharashtra Cricket Association Stadium, Pune	South Africa by 190 runs
ODI 4690	2 November	India	Rohit Sharma	Sri Lanka	Kusal Mendis	Wankhede Stadium, Mumbai	India by 302 runs
ODI 4691	3 November	Afghanistan	Hashmatullah Shahidi	Netherlands	Scott Edwards	Ekana Cricket Stadium, Lucknow	Afghanistan by 7 wickets
ODI 4692	4 November	New Zealand	Kane Williamson	Pakistan	Babar Azam	M. Chinnaswamy Stadium, Bengaluru	Pakistan by 21 runs (DLS)
ODI 4693	4 November	Australia	Pat Cummins	England	Jos Buttler	Narendra Modi Stadium, Ahmedabad	Australia by 33 runs
ODI 4694	5 November	India	Rohit Sharma	South Africa	Temba Bavuma	Eden Gardens, Kolkata	India by 243 runs
ODI 4695	6 November	Bangladesh	Shakib Al Hasan	Sri Lanka	Kusal Mendis	Arun Jaitley Cricket Stadium, Delhi	Bangladesh by 3 wickets
ODI 4696	7 November	Afghanistan	Hashmatullah Shahidi	Australia	Pat Cummins	Wankhede Stadium, Mumbai	Australia by 3 wickets
ODI 4697	8 November	England	Jos Buttler	Netherlands	Scott Edwards	Maharashtra Cricket Association Stadium, Pune	England by 160 runs
ODI 4698	9 November	New Zealand	Kane Williamson	Sri Lanka	Kusal Mendis	M. Chinnaswamy Stadium, Bengaluru	New Zealand by 5 wickets
ODI 4699	10 November	Afghanistan	Hashmatullah Shahidi	South Africa	Temba Bavuma	Narendra Modi Stadium, Ahmedabad	South Africa by 5 wickets
ODI 4700	11 November	Australia	Pat Cummins	Bangladesh	Najmul Hossain Shanto	Maharashtra Cricket Association Stadium, Pune	Australia by 8 wickets
ODI 4701	11 November	England	Jos Buttler	Pakistan	Babar Azam	Eden Gardens, Kolkata	England by 93 runs
ODI 4702	12 November	India	Rohit Sharma	Netherlands	Scott Edwards	M. Chinnaswamy Stadium, Bengaluru	India by 160 runs
Semi-finals
ODI 4703	15 November	India	Rohit Sharma	New Zealand	Kane Williamson	Wankhede Stadium, Mumbai	India by 70 runs
ODI 4704	16 November	South Africa	Temba Bavuma	Australia	Pat Cummins	Eden Gardens, Kolkata	Australia by 3 wickets
Final
ODI 4705	19 November	India	Rohit Sharma	Australia	Pat Cummins	Narendra Modi Stadium, Ahmedabad	Australia by 6 wickets

=== Ireland women against Scotland women in Spain ===
WODI series
No.	Date	Home captain	Away captain	Venue	Result
WODI 1345	17 October	Laura Delany	Kathryn Bryce	Desert Springs Cricket Ground, Almería	Scotland by 40 runs
WODI 1346	19 October	Laura Delany	Kathryn Bryce	Desert Springs Cricket Ground, Almería	Ireland by 79 runs
WODI 1347	21 October	Laura Delany	Kathryn Bryce	Desert Springs Cricket Ground, Almería	Ireland by 33 runs
WT20I series
No.	Date	Home captain	Away captain	Venue	Result
WT20I 1687	23 October	Laura Delany	Kathryn Bryce	Desert Springs Cricket Ground, Almería	Ireland by 7 wickets
WT20I 1688	24 October	Laura Delany	Kathryn Bryce	Desert Springs Cricket Ground, Almería	Scotland by 8 wickets

=== Zimbabwe in Namibia ===
T20I series
No.	Date	Home captain	Away captain	Venue	Result
T20I 2327	24 October	Gerhard Erasmus	Craig Ervine	Wanderers Cricket Ground, Windhoek	Namibia by 7 wickets
T20I 2329	25 October	Gerhard Erasmus	Craig Ervine	Wanderers Cricket Ground, Windhoek	Zimbabwe by 5 wickets
T20I 2331	27 October	Gerhard Erasmus	Craig Ervine	United Ground, Windhoek	Zimbabwe by 6 wickets
T20I 2332	29 October	Gerhard Erasmus	Craig Ervine	United Ground, Windhoek	Namibia by 7 wickets
T20I 2337	30 October	Gerhard Erasmus	Craig Ervine	United Ground, Windhoek	Namibia by 8 runs

=== Pakistan women in Bangladesh ===
WT20I series
No.	Date	Home captain	Away captain	Venue	Result
WT20I 1689	25 October	Nigar Sultana	Nida Dar	Zohur Ahmed Chowdhury Stadium, Chittagong	Bangladesh by 5 wickets
WT20I 1690	27 October	Nigar Sultana	Nida Dar	Zohur Ahmed Chowdhury Stadium, Chittagong	Bangladesh by 20 runs
WT20I 1691	29 October	Nigar Sultana	Nida Dar	Zohur Ahmed Chowdhury Stadium, Chittagong	Pakistan by 31 runs
2022–2025 ICC Women's Championship — WODI series
No.	Date	Home captain	Away captain	Venue	Result
WODI 1348	4 November	Nigar Sultana	Nida Dar	Sher-e-Bangla National Cricket Stadium, Mirpur	Pakistan by 5 wickets
WODI 1349	7 November	Nigar Sultana	Nida Dar	Sher-e-Bangla National Cricket Stadium, Mirpur	Match tied (Bangladesh won S/O)
WODI 1350	10 November	Nigar Sultana	Nida Dar	Sher-e-Bangla National Cricket Stadium, Mirpur	Bangladesh by 7 wickets

== December ==
=== Pakistan women in New Zealand ===
WT20I series
No.	Date	Home captain	Away captain	Venue	Result
WT20I 1700	3 December	Sophie Devine	Nida Dar	University of Otago Oval, Dunedin	Pakistan by 7 wickets
WT20I 1702	5 December	Sophie Devine	Nida Dar	University of Otago Oval, Dunedin	Pakistan by 10 runs
WT20I 1706	9 December	Amelia Kerr	Nida Dar	John Davies Oval, Queenstown	New Zealand by 6 runs (DLS)
2022–2025 ICC Women's Championship — WODI series
No.	Date	Home captain	Away captain	Venue	Result
WODI 1351	12 December	Sophie Devine	Nida Dar	John Davies Oval, Queenstown	New Zealand by 131 runs
WODI 1352	15 December	Sophie Devine	Fatima Sana	Hagley Oval, Christchurch	New Zealand by 1 wicket
WODI 1354	18 December	Sophie Devine	Fatima Sana	Hagley Oval, Christchurch	Match tied (Pakistan won S/O)

=== Bangladesh women in South Africa ===
WT20I series
No.	Date	Home captain	Away captain	Venue	Result
WT20I 1701	3 December	Tazmin Brits	Nigar Sultana	Willowmoore Park, Benoni	Bangladesh by 13 runs
WT20I 1704	6 December	Laura Wolvaardt	Nigar Sultana	Diamond Oval, Kimberley	No result
WT20I 1705	8 December	Laura Wolvaardt	Nigar Sultana	Diamond Oval, Kimberley	South Africa by 8 wickets
2022–2025 ICC Women's Championship — WODI series
No.	Date	Home captain	Away captain	Venue	Result
WODI 1353	16 December	Laura Wolvaardt	Nigar Sultana	Buffalo Park, East London	Bangladesh by 119 runs
WODI 1355	20 December	Laura Wolvaardt	Nigar Sultana	JB Marks Oval, Potchefstroom	South Africa by 8 wickets
WODI 1356	23 December	Laura Wolvaardt	Nigar Sultana	Willowmoore Park, Benoni	South Africa by 216 runs

=== England in the West Indies ===
ODI series
No.	Date	Home captain	Away captain	Venue	Result
ODI 4706	3 December	Shai Hope	Jos Buttler	Sir Vivian Richards Stadium, Antigua	West Indies by 4 wickets
ODI 4707	6 December	Shai Hope	Jos Buttler	Sir Vivian Richards Stadium, Antigua	England by 6 wickets
ODI 4708	9 December	Shai Hope	Jos Buttler	Kensington Oval, Barbados	West Indies by 4 wickets (DLS)
T20I series
No.	Date	Home captain	Away captain	Venue	Result
T20I 2397	12 December	Rovman Powell	Jos Buttler	Kensington Oval, Barbados	West Indies by 4 wickets
T20I 2402	14 December	Rovman Powell	Jos Buttler	National Cricket Stadium, Grenada	West Indies by 10 runs
T20I 2407	16 December	Rovman Powell	Jos Buttler	National Cricket Stadium, Grenada	England by 7 wickets
T20I 2414	19 December	Rovman Powell	Jos Buttler	Brian Lara Cricket Academy, Trinidad and Tobago	England by 75 runs
T20I 2415	21 December	Rovman Powell	Jos Buttler	Brian Lara Cricket Academy, Trinidad and Tobago	West Indies by 4 wickets

=== England women in India ===
WT20I series
No.	Date	Home captain	Away captain	Venue	Result
WT20I 1703	6 December	Harmanpreet Kaur	Heather Knight	Wankhede Stadium, Mumbai	England by 38 runs
WT20I 1709	9 December	Harmanpreet Kaur	Heather Knight	Wankhede Stadium, Mumbai	England by 4 wickets
WT20I 1712	10 December	Harmanpreet Kaur	Heather Knight	Wankhede Stadium, Mumbai	India by 5 wickets
Only WTest
No.	Date	Home captain	Away captain	Venue	Result
WTest 146	14–17 December	Harmanpreet Kaur	Heather Knight	DY Patil Stadium, Navi Mumbai	India by 347 runs

=== Ireland in Zimbabwe ===
T20I series
No.	Date	Home captain	Away captain	Venue	Result
T20I 2384	7 December	Sikandar Raza	Paul Stirling	Harare Sports Club, Harare	Zimbabwe by 1 wicket
T20I 2388	9 December	Sean Williams	Paul Stirling	Harare Sports Club, Harare	Ireland by 4 wickets
T20I 2391	10 December	Ryan Burl	Paul Stirling	Harare Sports Club, Harare	Ireland by 6 wickets
ODI series
No.	Date	Home captain	Away captain	Venue	Result
ODI 4709	13 December	Sikandar Raza	Paul Stirling	Harare Sports Club, Harare	No result
ODI 4710	15 December	Sikandar Raza	Paul Stirling	Harare Sports Club, Harare	Ireland by 4 wickets
ODI 4712	17 December	Sikandar Raza	Paul Stirling	Harare Sports Club, Harare	Ireland by 7 wickets (DLS)

=== India in South Africa ===
T20I series
No.	Date	Home captain	Away captain	Venue	Result
T20I 2392a	10 December	Aiden Markram	Suryakumar Yadav	Kingsmead Cricket Ground, Durban	Match abandoned
T20I 2396	12 December	Aiden Markram	Suryakumar Yadav	St George's Park Cricket Ground, Gqeberha	South Africa by 5 wickets (DLS)
T20I 2401	14 December	Aiden Markram	Suryakumar Yadav	Wanderers Stadium, Johannesburg	India by 106 runs
ODI series
No.	Date	Home captain	Away captain	Venue	Result
ODI 4713	17 December	Aiden Markram	KL Rahul	Wanderers Stadium, Johannesburg	India by 8 wickets
ODI 4714	19 December	Aiden Markram	KL Rahul	St George's Park Cricket Ground, Gqeberha	South Africa by 8 wickets
ODI 4716	21 December	Aiden Markram	KL Rahul	Boland Park, Paarl	India by 78 runs
2023–2025 ICC World Test Championship – Test series
No.	Date	Home captain	Away captain	Venue	Result
Test 2520	26–30 December	Temba Bavuma	Rohit Sharma	Centurion Park, Centurion	South Africa by an innings and 32 runs
Test 2522	3–7 January	Dean Elgar	Rohit Sharma	Newlands Cricket Ground, Cape Town	India by 7 wickets

=== Pakistan in Australia ===
2023–2025 ICC World Test Championship – Test series
No.	Date	Home captain	Away captain	Venue	Result
Test 2518	14–18 December	Pat Cummins	Shan Masood	Perth Stadium, Perth	Australia by 360 runs
Test 2519	26–30 December	Pat Cummins	Shan Masood	Melbourne Cricket Ground, Melbourne	Australia by 79 runs
Test 2521	3–7 January	Pat Cummins	Shan Masood	Sydney Cricket Ground, Sydney	Australia by 8 wickets

=== Bangladesh in New Zealand ===
ODI series
No.	Date	Home captain	Away captain	Venue	Result
ODI 4711	17 December	Tom Latham	Najmul Hossain Shanto	University of Otago Oval, Dunedin	New Zealand by 44 runs (DLS)
ODI 4715	20 December	Tom Latham	Najmul Hossain Shanto	Saxton Oval, Nelson	New Zealand by 7 wickets
ODI 4717	23 December	Tom Latham	Najmul Hossain Shanto	McLean Park, Napier	Bangladesh by 9 wickets
T20I series
No.	Date	Home captain	Away captain	Venue	Result
T20I 2422	27 December	Mitchell Santner	Najmul Hossain Shanto	McLean Park, Napier	Bangladesh by 5 wickets
T20I 2423	29 December	Mitchell Santner	Najmul Hossain Shanto	Bay Oval, Mount Maunganui	No result
T20I 2425	31 December	Mitchell Santner	Najmul Hossain Shanto	Bay Oval, Mount Maunganui	New Zealand by 17 runs (DLS)

=== Australia women in India ===
Only WTest
No.	Date	Home captain	Away captain	Venue	Result
WTest 147	21–24 December	Harmanpreet Kaur	Alyssa Healy	Wankhede Stadium, Mumbai	India by 8 wickets
WODI series
No.	Date	Home captain	Away captain	Venue	Result
WODI 1357	28 December	Harmanpreet Kaur	Alyssa Healy	Wankhede Stadium, Mumbai	Australia by 6 wickets
WODI 1358	30 December	Harmanpreet Kaur	Alyssa Healy	Wankhede Stadium, Mumbai	Australia by 3 runs
WODI 1359	2 January	Harmanpreet Kaur	Alyssa Healy	Wankhede Stadium, Mumbai	Australia by 190 runs
WT20I series
No.	Date	Home captain	Away captain	Venue	Result
WT20I 1728	5 January	Harmanpreet Kaur	Alyssa Healy	DY Patil Stadium, Navi Mumbai	India by 9 wickets
WT20I 1729	7 January	Harmanpreet Kaur	Alyssa Healy	DY Patil Stadium, Navi Mumbai	Australia by 6 wickets
WT20I 1730	9 January	Harmanpreet Kaur	Alyssa Healy	DY Patil Stadium, Navi Mumbai	Australia by 7 wickets

=== Afghanistan in the UAE ===
T20I series
No.	Date	Home captain	Away captain	Venue	Result
T20I 2424	29 December	Muhammad Waseem	Ibrahim Zadran	Sharjah Cricket Stadium, Sharjah	Afghanistan by 72 runs
T20I 2426	31 December	Muhammad Waseem	Ibrahim Zadran	Sharjah Cricket Stadium, Sharjah	United Arab Emirates by 11 runs
T20I 2427	2 January	Muhammad Waseem	Ibrahim Zadran	Sharjah Cricket Stadium, Sharjah	Afghanistan by 4 wickets

== January ==
=== Zimbabwe in Sri Lanka ===
ODI series
No.	Date	Home captain	Away captain	Venue	Result
ODI 4718	6 January	Kusal Mendis	Craig Ervine	R. Premadasa Stadium, Colombo	No result
ODI 4719	8 January	Kusal Mendis	Craig Ervine	R. Premadasa Stadium, Colombo	Sri Lanka by 2 wickets
ODI 4720	11 January	Kusal Mendis	Craig Ervine	R. Premadasa Stadium, Colombo	Sri Lanka by 8 wickets (DLS)
T20I series
No.	Date	Home captain	Away captain	Venue	Result
T20I 2432	14 January	Wanindu Hasaranga	Sikandar Raza	R. Premadasa Stadium, Colombo	Sri Lanka by 3 wickets
T20I 2433	16 January	Wanindu Hasaranga	Sikandar Raza	R. Premadasa Stadium, Colombo	Zimbabwe by 4 wickets
T20I 2436	18 January	Wanindu Hasaranga	Sikandar Raza	R. Premadasa Stadium, Colombo	Sri Lanka by 9 wickets

=== Afghanistan in India ===
T20I series
No.	Date	Home captain	Away captain	Venue	Result
T20I 2428	11 January	Rohit Sharma	Ibrahim Zadran	Inderjit Singh Bindra Stadium, Mohali	India by 6 wickets
T20I 2431	14 January	Rohit Sharma	Ibrahim Zadran	Holkar Stadium, Indore	India by 6 wickets
T20I 2435	17 January	Rohit Sharma	Ibrahim Zadran	M. Chinnaswamy Stadium, Bangalore	Match tied (India won second S/O)

=== Pakistan in New Zealand ===
T20I series
No.	Date	Home captain	Away captain	Venue	Result
T20I 2429	12 January	Kane Williamson	Shaheen Afridi	Eden Park, Auckland	New Zealand by 46 runs
T20I 2430	14 January	Kane Williamson	Shaheen Afridi	Seddon Park, Hamilton	New Zealand by 21 runs
T20I 2434	17 January	Mitchell Santner	Shaheen Afridi	University of Otago Oval, Dunedin	New Zealand by 45 runs
T20I 2437	19 January	Mitchell Santner	Shaheen Afridi	Hagley Oval, Christchurch	New Zealand by 7 wickets
T20I 2438	21 January	Mitchell Santner	Shaheen Afridi	Hagley Oval, Christchurch	Pakistan by 42 runs

=== West Indies in Australia ===
2023–2025 ICC World Test Championship – Test series
No.	Date	Home captain	Away captain	Venue	Result
Test 2523	17–21 January	Pat Cummins	Kraigg Brathwaite	Adelaide Oval, Adelaide	Australia by 10 wickets
Test 2524	25–29 January	Pat Cummins	Kraigg Brathwaite	The Gabba, Brisbane	West Indies by 8 runs
ODI series
No.	Date	Home captain	Away captain	Venue	Result
ODI 4721	2 February	Steve Smith	Shai Hope	Melbourne Cricket Ground, Melbourne	Australia by 8 wickets
ODI 4722	4 February	Steve Smith	Shai Hope	Sydney Cricket Ground, Sydney	Australia by 83 runs
ODI 4723	6 February	Steve Smith	Shai Hope	Manuka Oval, Canberra	Australia by 8 wickets
T20I series
No.	Date	Home captain	Away captain	Venue	Result
T20I 2459	9 February	Mitchell Marsh	Rovman Powell	Bellerive Oval, Hobart	Australia by 11 runs
T20I 2462	11 February	Mitchell Marsh	Rovman Powell	Adelaide Oval, Adelaide	Australia by 34 runs
T20I 2467	13 February	Mitchell Marsh	Rovman Powell	Perth Stadium, Perth	West Indies by 37 runs

=== Ireland women in Zimbabwe ===
WODI series
No.	Date	Home captain	Away captain	Venue	Result
WODI 1360	18 January	Mary-Anne Musonda	Laura Delany	Harare Sports Club, Harare	Ireland by 10 wickets (DLS)
WODI 1361	21 January	Mary-Anne Musonda	Laura Delany	Harare Sports Club, Harare	Match tied (DLS)
WODI 1362	23 January	Mary-Anne Musonda	Laura Delany	Harare Sports Club, Harare	Ireland by 81 runs
WT20I series
No.	Date	Home captain	Away captain	Venue	Result
WT20I 1743	26 January	Mary-Anne Musonda	Laura Delany	Harare Sports Club, Harare	Ireland by 57 runs
WT20I 1746	28 January	Mary-Anne Musonda	Laura Delany	Harare Sports Club, Harare	Ireland by 42 runs
WT20I 1748	30 January	Mary-Anne Musonda	Laura Delany	Harare Sports Club, Harare	Ireland by 60 runs
WT20I 1749	1 February	Mary-Anne Musonda	Laura Delany	Harare Sports Club, Harare	Ireland by 9 wickets
WT20I 1750	2 February	Mary-Anne Musonda	Laura Delany	Harare Sports Club, Harare	Ireland by 14 runs

=== England in India ===
2023–2025 ICC World Test Championship – Test series
No.	Date	Home captain	Away captain	Venue	Result
Test 2525	25–29 January	Rohit Sharma	Ben Stokes	Rajiv Gandhi International Cricket Stadium, Hyderabad	England by 28 runs
Test 2526	2–6 February	Rohit Sharma	Ben Stokes	ACA–VDCA Cricket Stadium, Visakhapatnam	India by 106 runs
Test 2530	15–19 February	Rohit Sharma	Ben Stokes	Niranjan Shah Stadium, Rajkot	India by 434 runs
Test 2531	23–27 February	Rohit Sharma	Ben Stokes	JSCA International Stadium Complex, Ranchi	India by 5 wickets
Test 2534	7–11 March	Rohit Sharma	Ben Stokes	Himachal Pradesh Cricket Association Stadium, Dharamshala	India by an innings and 64 runs

=== South Africa women in Australia ===
WT20I series
No.	Date	Home captain	Away captain	Venue	Result
WT20I 1744	27 January	Alyssa Healy	Laura Wolvaardt	Manuka Oval, Canberra	Australia by 8 wickets
WT20I 1745	28 January	Alyssa Healy	Laura Wolvaardt	Manuka Oval, Canberra	South Africa by 6 wickets
WT20I 1747	30 January	Alyssa Healy	Laura Wolvaardt	Bellerive Oval, Hobart	Australia by 5 wickets
2022–2025 ICC Women's Championship — WODI series
No.	Date	Home captain	Away captain	Venue	Result
WODI 1363	3 February	Alyssa Healy	Laura Wolvaardt	Adelaide Oval, Adelaide	Australia by 8 wickets
WODI 1364	7 February	Alyssa Healy	Laura Wolvaardt	North Sydney Oval, Sydney	South Africa by 84 runs (DLS)
WODI 1365	10 February	Alyssa Healy	Laura Wolvaardt	North Sydney Oval, Sydney	Australia by 110 runs (DLS)
Only WTest
No.	Date	Home captain	Away captain	Venue	Result
WTest 148	15–18 February	Alyssa Healy	Laura Wolvaardt	WACA Ground, Perth	Australia by an innings and 284 runs

== February ==
=== Afghanistan in Sri Lanka ===
Only Test
No.	Date	Home captain	Away captain	Venue	Result
Test 2527	2–6 February	Dhananjaya de Silva	Hashmatullah Shahidi	Singhalese Sports Club Cricket Ground, Colombo	Sri Lanka by 10 wickets
ODI series
No.	Date	Home captain	Away captain	Venue	Result
ODI 4725	9 February	Kusal Mendis	Hashmatullah Shahidi	Pallekele International Cricket Stadium, Kandy	Sri Lanka by 42 runs
ODI 4727	11 February	Kusal Mendis	Hashmatullah Shahidi	Pallekele International Cricket Stadium, Kandy	Sri Lanka by 155 runs
ODI 4729	14 February	Kusal Mendis	Hashmatullah Shahidi	Pallekele International Cricket Stadium, Kandy	Sri Lanka by 7 wickets
T20I series
No.	Date	Home captain	Away captain	Venue	Result
T20I 2479	17 February	Wanindu Hasaranga	Ibrahim Zadran	Rangiri Dambulla International Stadium, Dambulla	Sri Lanka by 4 runs
T20I 2480	19 February	Wanindu Hasaranga	Ibrahim Zadran	Rangiri Dambulla International Stadium, Dambulla	Sri Lanka by 72 runs
T20I 2482	21 February	Wanindu Hasaranga	Ibrahim Zadran	Rangiri Dambulla International Stadium, Dambulla	Afghanistan by 3 runs

=== South Africa in New Zealand ===
2023–2025 ICC World Test Championship – Test series
No.	Date	Home captain	Away captain	Venue	Result
Test 2528	4–8 February	Tim Southee	Neil Brand	Bay Oval, Mount Maunganui	New Zealand by 281 runs
Test 2529	13–17 February	Tim Southee	Neil Brand	Seddon Park, Hamilton	New Zealand by 7 wickets

=== Canada in Nepal ===
ODI series
No.	Date	Home captain	Away captain	Venue	Result
ODI 4724	8 February	Rohit Paudel	Saad Bin Zafar	Tribhuvan University International Cricket Ground, Kirtipur	Nepal by 7 runs
ODI 4726	10 February	Rohit Paudel	Saad Bin Zafar	Tribhuvan University International Cricket Ground, Kirtipur	Nepal by 4 wickets
ODI 4728	12 February	Rohit Paudel	Saad Bin Zafar	Tribhuvan University International Cricket Ground, Kirtipur	Nepal by 9 wickets

=== 2024 Nepal Tri-Nation Series (round 1) ===
2024–2026 Cricket World Cup League 2 – Tri-series
No.	Date	Team 1	Captain 1	Team 2	Captain 2	Venue	Result
ODI 4730	15 February	Nepal	Rohit Paudel	Namibia	Gerhard Erasmus	Tribhuvan University International Cricket Ground, Kirtipur	Namibia by 4 wickets
ODI 4731	17 February	Nepal	Rohit Paudel	Netherlands	Scott Edwards	Tribhuvan University International Cricket Ground, Kirtipur	Nepal by 9 wickets
ODI 4732	19 February	Namibia	Gerhard Erasmus	Netherlands	Scott Edwards	Tribhuvan University International Cricket Ground, Kirtipur	Netherlands by 7 wickets
ODI 4733	21 February	Nepal	Rohit Paudel	Namibia	Gerhard Erasmus	Tribhuvan University International Cricket Ground, Kirtipur	Namibia by 2 wickets
ODI 4734	23 February	Namibia	Gerhard Erasmus	Netherlands	Scott Edwards	Tribhuvan University International Cricket Ground, Kirtipur	Namibia by 24 runs
ODI 4735	25 February	Nepal	Rohit Paudel	Netherlands	Scott Edwards	Tribhuvan University International Cricket Ground, Kirtipur	Netherlands by 8 wickets

=== Australia in New Zealand ===
T20I series
No.	Date	Home captain	Away captain	Venue	Result
T20I 2481	21 February	Mitchell Santner	Mitchell Marsh	Sky Stadium, Wellington	Australia by 6 wickets
T20I 2483	23 February	Mitchell Santner	Mitchell Marsh	Eden Park, Auckland	Australia by 72 runs
T20I 2484	25 February	Mitchell Santner	Matthew Wade	Eden Park, Auckland	Australia by 27 runs (DLS)
2023–2025 ICC World Test Championship – Test series
No.	Date	Home captain	Away captain	Venue	Result
Test 2533	29 February – 4 March	Tim Southee	Pat Cummins	Basin Reserve, Wellington	Australia by 172 runs
Test 2535	8–12 March	Tim Southee	Pat Cummins	Hagley Oval, Christchurch	Australia by 3 wickets

=== 2024 ICC Cricket World Cup Challenge League Play-off ===
==== Group stage ====
Pos	Team	Pld	W	L	NR	Pts	NRR
1	Kuwait	3	2	1	0	4	0.292
2	Italy	3	2	1	0	4	0.574
3	Bermuda	3	1	2	0	2	−1.108
4	Saudi Arabia	3	1	2	0	2	0.298

Source: ESPNcricinfo

Pos	Team	Pld	W	L	NR	Pts	NRR
1	Tanzania	3	2	1	0	4	0.633
2	Bahrain	3	2	1	0	4	0.713
3	Vanuatu	3	1	2	0	2	−0.791
4	Malaysia	3	1	2	0	2	−0.742

Source: ESPNcricinfo

Group stage
No.	Date	Team 1	Captain 1	Team 2	Captain 2	Venue	Result
1st Match	22 February	Bermuda	Delray Rawlins	Italy	Gareth Berg	Selangor Turf Club, Seri Kembangan	Italy by 157 runs
2nd Match	22 February	Bahrain	Sohail Ahmed	Vanuatu	Joshua Rasu	UKM-YSD Cricket Oval, Bangi	Bahrain by 109 runs
3rd Match	22 February	Kuwait	Mohammed Aslam	Saudi Arabia	Hisham Sheikh	Bayuemas Oval, Pandamaran	Saudi Arabia by 97 runs
4th Match	23 February	Tanzania	Abhik Patwa	Vanuatu	Joshua Rasu	Bayuemas Oval, Pandamaran	Tanzania by 77 runs
5th Match	23 February	Italy	Gareth Berg	Saudi Arabia	Hisham Sheikh	UKM-YSD Cricket Oval, Bangi	Italy by 52 runs (DLS)
6th Match	23 February	Malaysia	Virandeep Singh	Bahrain	Sohail Ahmed	Selangor Turf Club, Seri Kembangan	Bahrain by 18 runs
7th Match	25 February	Bermuda	Delray Rawlins	Saudi Arabia	Hisham Sheikh	Selangor Turf Club, Seri Kembangan	Bermuda by 4 runs
8th Match	25 February	Malaysia	Virandeep Singh	Tanzania	Abhik Patwa	UKM-YSD Cricket Oval, Bangi	Malaysia by 1 wicket
9th Match	25 February	Italy	Gareth Berg	Kuwait	Mohammed Aslam	Bayuemas Oval, Pandamaran	Kuwait by 130 runs
10th Match	26 February	Bahrain	Sohail Ahmed	Tanzania	Abhik Patwa	Selangor Turf Club, Seri Kembangan	Tanzania by 20 runs
11th Match	26 February	Bermuda	Delray Rawlins	Kuwait	Mohammed Aslam	UKM-YSD Cricket Oval, Bangi	Kuwait by 5 wickets
12th Match	26 February	Malaysia	Virandeep Singh	Vanuatu	Joshua Rasu	Bayuemas Oval, Pandamaran	Vanuatu by 3 wickets

==== Super Six ====
Pos	Team	Pld	W	L	NR	Pts	NRR
1	Kuwait	5	5	0	0	10	2.215
2	Italy	5	3	2	0	6	1.163
3	Bahrain	5	3	2	0	6	0.481
4	Tanzania	5	3	2	0	6	−0.356
5	Vanuatu	5	1	4	0	2	−1.999
6	Bermuda	5	0	5	0	0	−1.637

Source: ESPNcricinfo

Super Six
No.	Date	Team 1	Captain 1	Team 2	Captain 2	Venue	Result
13th Match	28 February	Kuwait	Mohammed Aslam	Vanuatu	Joshua Rasu	Selangor Turf Club, Seri Kembangan	Kuwait by 228 runs
14th Match	28 February	Bahrain	Gareth Berg	Italy	Sohail Ahmed	UKM-YSD Cricket Oval, Bangi	Bahrain by 5 wickets
15th Match	28 February	Bermuda	Delray Rawlins	Tanzania	Abhik Patwa	Bayuemas Oval, Pandamaran	Tanzania by 127 runs
16th Match	1 March	Bermuda	Delray Rawlins	Vanuatu	Joshua Rasu	Selangor Turf Club, Seri Kembangan	Vanuatu by 31 runs
17th Match	1 March	Bahrain	Mohammed Aslam	Kuwait	Sohail Ahmed	UKM-YSD Cricket Oval, Bangi	Kuwait by 5 wickets (DLS)
18th Match	1 March	Italy	Gareth Berg	Tanzania	Abhik Patwa	Bayuemas Oval, Pandamaran	Italy by 162 runs
19th Match	3 March	Kuwait	Mohammed Aslam	Tanzania	Abhik Patwa	Selangor Turf Club, Seri Kembangan	Kuwait by 151 runs
20th Match	3 March	Italy	Gareth Berg	Vanuatu	Joshua Rasu	UKM-YSD Cricket Oval, Bangi	Italy by 2 wickets
21st Match	3 March	Bahrain	Delray Rawlins	Bermuda	Sohail Ahmed	Bayuemas Oval, Pandamaran	Bahrain by 30 runs (DLS)

=== Ireland against Afghanistan in UAE ===
Only Test
No.	Date	Home captain	Away captain	Venue	Result
Test 2532	28 February–3 March	Hashmatullah Shahidi	Andrew Balbirnie	Tolerance Oval, Abu Dhabi	Ireland by 6 wickets
ODI series
No.	Date	Home captain	Away captain	Venue	Result
ODI 4741	7 March	Hashmatullah Shahidi	Paul Stirling	Sharjah Cricket Stadium, Sharjah	Afghanistan by 35 runs
ODI 4741a	9 March	Hashmatullah Shahidi	Paul Stirling	Sharjah Cricket Stadium, Sharjah	Match abandoned
ODI 4742	12 March	Hashmatullah Shahidi	Paul Stirling	Sharjah Cricket Stadium, Sharjah	Afghanistan by 117 runs
T20I series
No.	Date	Home captain	Away captain	Venue	Result
T20I 2521	15 March	Rashid Khan	Paul Stirling	Sharjah Cricket Stadium, Sharjah	Ireland by 38 runs
T20I 2526	17 March	Rashid Khan	Paul Stirling	Sharjah Cricket Stadium, Sharjah	Afghanistan by 10 runs
T20I 2529	18 March	Rashid Khan	Paul Stirling	Sharjah Cricket Stadium, Sharjah	Afghanistan by 57 runs

=== 2024 United Arab Emirates Tri-Nation Series (round 2) ===
2024–2026 Cricket World Cup League 2 – Tri-series
No.	Date	Team 1	Captain 1	Team 2	Captain 2	Venue	Result
ODI 4736	28 February	United Arab Emirates	Muhammad Waseem	Canada	Saad Bin Zafar	Dubai International Cricket Stadium, Dubai	Canada by 3 wickets
ODI 4737	1 March	Canada	Saad Bin Zafar	Scotland	Richie Berrington	Dubai International Cricket Stadium, Dubai	Canada by 7 wickets
ODI 4738	3 March	United Arab Emirates	Muhammad Waseem	Scotland	Richie Berrington	Dubai International Cricket Stadium, Dubai	Scotland by 8 wickets
ODI 4739	5 March	United Arab Emirates	Muhammad Waseem	Canada	Saad Bin Zafar	Dubai International Cricket Stadium, Dubai	Canada by 8 runs (DLS)
ODI 4740	7 March	Canada	Saad Bin Zafar	Scotland	Richie Berrington	Dubai International Cricket Stadium, Dubai	Canada by 5 wickets
6th ODI	9 March	United Arab Emirates	Muhammad Waseem	Scotland	Richie Berrington	Dubai International Cricket Stadium, Dubai	Match postponed

== March ==
=== Sri Lanka in Bangladesh ===
T20I series
No.	Date	Home captain	Away captain	Venue	Result
T20I 2494	4 March	Najmul Hossain Shanto	Charith Asalanka	Sylhet International Cricket Stadium, Sylhet	Sri Lanka by 3 runs
T20I 2501	6 March	Najmul Hossain Shanto	Charith Asalanka	Sylhet International Cricket Stadium, Sylhet	Bangladesh by 8 wickets
T20I 2509	9 March	Najmul Hossain Shanto	Wanindu Hasaranga	Sylhet International Cricket Stadium, Sylhet	Sri Lanka by 28 runs
ODI series
No.	Date	Home captain	Away captain	Venue	Result
ODI 4743	13 March	Najmul Hossain Shanto	Kusal Mendis	Zohur Ahmed Chowdhury Stadium, Chattogram	Bangladesh by 6 wickets
ODI 4744	15 March	Najmul Hossain Shanto	Kusal Mendis	Zohur Ahmed Chowdhury Stadium, Chattogram	Sri Lanka by 3 wickets
ODI 4745	18 March	Najmul Hossain Shanto	Kusal Mendis	Zohur Ahmed Chowdhury Stadium, Chattogram	Bangladesh by 4 wickets
2023–2025 ICC World Test Championship – Test series
No.	Date	Home captain	Away captain	Venue	Result
Test 2536	22–26 March	Najmul Hossain Shanto	Dhananjaya de Silva	Sylhet International Cricket Stadium, Sylhet	Sri Lanka by 328 runs
Test 2537	30 March–3 April	Najmul Hossain Shanto	Dhananjaya de Silva	Zohur Ahmed Chowdhury Stadium, Chattogram	Sri Lanka by 192 runs

=== England women in New Zealand ===
WT20I series
No.	Date	Home captain	Away captain	Venue	Result
WT20I 1808	19 March	Suzie Bates	Heather Knight	University of Otago Oval, Dunedin	England by 27 runs
WT20I 1809	22 March	Sophie Devine	Heather Knight	Saxton Oval, Nelson	England by 15 runs
WT20I 1810	24 March	Sophie Devine	Heather Knight	Saxton Oval, Nelson	New Zealand by 3 runs
WT20I 1811	27 March	Sophie Devine	Heather Knight	Basin Reserve, Wellington	England by 47 runs
WT20I 1813	29 March	Amelia Kerr	Heather Knight	Basin Reserve, Wellington	England by 5 wickets
2022–2025 ICC Women's Championship — WODI series
No.	Date	Home captain	Away captain	Venue	Result
WODI 1372	1 April	Amelia Kerr	Heather Knight	Basin Reserve, Wellington	England by 4 wickets
WODI 1373	4 April	Amelia Kerr	Heather Knight	Seddon Park, Hamilton	England by 56 runs
WODI 1374	7 April	Sophie Devine	Heather Knight	Seddon Park, Hamilton	New Zealand by 7 wickets

=== Australia women in Bangladesh ===
2022–2025 ICC Women's Championship — WODI series
No.	Date	Home captain	Away captain	Venue	Result
WODI 1366	21 March	Nigar Sultana	Alyssa Healy	Sher-e-Bangla National Cricket Stadium, Mirpur	Australia by 118 runs
WODI 1367	24 March	Nigar Sultana	Alyssa Healy	Sher-e-Bangla National Cricket Stadium, Mirpur	Australia by 6 wickets
WODI 1370	27 March	Nigar Sultana	Alyssa Healy	Sher-e-Bangla National Cricket Stadium, Mirpur	Australia by 8 wickets
WT20I series
No.	Date	Home captain	Away captain	Venue	Result
WT20I 1816	31 March	Nigar Sultana	Alyssa Healy	Sher-e-Bangla National Cricket Stadium, Mirpur	Australia by 10 wickets
WT20I 1818	2 April	Nigar Sultana	Alyssa Healy	Sher-e-Bangla National Cricket Stadium, Mirpur	Australia by 58 runs
WT20I 1821	4 April	Nigar Sultana	Alyssa Healy	Sher-e-Bangla National Cricket Stadium, Mirpur	Australia by 77 runs

=== Papua New Guinea women in Zimbabwe ===
WODI series
No.	Date	Home captain	Away captain	Venue	Result
WODI 1368	24 March	Mary-Anne Musonda	Brenda Tau	Harare Sports Club, Harare	Zimbabwe by 7 wickets
WODI 1369	26 March	Mary-Anne Musonda	Brenda Tau	Harare Sports Club, Harare	Zimbabwe by 2 wickets
WODI 1371	28 March	Josephine Nkomo	Brenda Tau	Harare Sports Club, Harare	Zimbabwe by 35 runs
WT20I series
No.	Date	Home captain	Away captain	Venue	Result
WT20I 1814	30 March	Mary-Anne Musonda	Brenda Tau	Harare Sports Club, Harare	Zimbabwe by 8 wickets
WT20I 1817	31 March	Mary-Anne Musonda	Brenda Tau	Harare Sports Club, Harare	Match tied (Papua New Guinea won S/O)
WT20I 1819	2 April	Mary-Anne Musonda	Brenda Tau	Harare Sports Club, Harare	Zimbabwe by 32 runs

=== Sri Lanka women in South Africa ===
WT20I series
No.	Date	Home captain	Away captain	Venue	Result
WT20I 1812	27 March	Laura Wolvaardt	Chamari Athapaththu	Willowmoore Park, Benoni	South Africa by 79 runs
WT20I 1815	30 March	Nadine de Klerk	Chamari Athapaththu	JB Marks Oval, Potchefstroom	Sri Lanka by 7 wickets
WT20I 1820	3 April	Laura Wolvaardt	Chamari Athapaththu	Buffalo Park, East London	Sri Lanka by 4 wickets
2022–2025 ICC Women's Championship — WODI series
No.	Date	Home captain	Away captain	Venue	Result
WODI 1375	9 April	Laura Wolvaardt	Chamari Athapaththu	Buffalo Park, East London	No result
WODI 1378	13 April	Laura Wolvaardt	Chamari Athapaththu	Diamond Oval, Kimberley	South Africa by 7 wickets
WODI 1380	17 April	Laura Wolvaardt	Chamari Athapaththu	JB Marks Oval, Potchefstroom	Sri Lanka by 6 wickets

== See also ==
- Associate international cricket in 2023–24
- Associate international cricket in 2023
- International cricket in 2023
