= List of five-wicket hauls in women's Twenty20 International cricket =

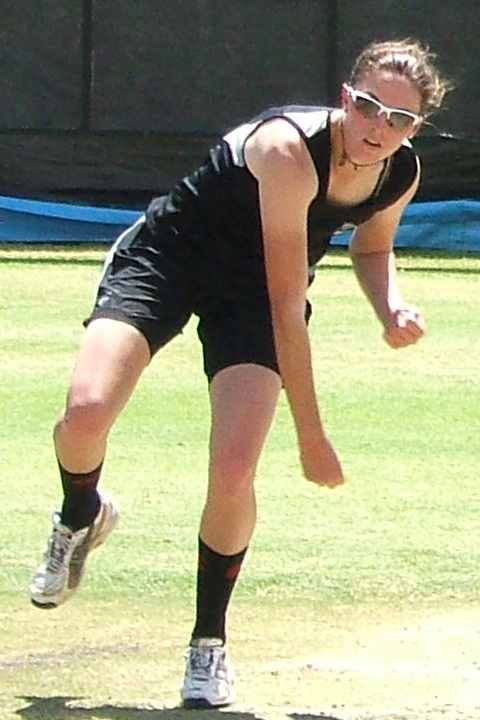
Amy Satterthwaite was the first player to take a five-wicket haul in a WT20I match.

A women's Twenty20 International (WT20I) is an international cricket match between two teams, each having WT20I status, as determined by the International Cricket Council (ICC), the sport's world governing body. In a women's Twenty20 match, the two teams play a single innings, each of which is restricted to a maximum of 20 overs. The Twenty20 format was originally introduced by the England and Wales Cricket Board for the men's county cricket competition with the first matches contested on 13 June 2003 between the English counties in the Twenty20 Cup. The first women's Twenty20 International match took place on 5 August 2004 when New Zealand defeated England by nine runs at the County Cricket Ground in Hove. This match was held six months before the first men's Twenty20 International, contested between Australia and New Zealand in February 2005.

A five-wicket haul (also known as a "five-for" or "fifer") refers to a bowler taking five or more wickets in a single innings. This is regarded as a notable achievement, especially in the Twenty20 format, as bowlers can bowl no more than four overs in an innings. The first five-wicket haul in a WT20I match was taken by New Zealand's Amy Satterthwaite against England in August 2007. Satterthwaite took six wickets for 17 runs, the first six-wicket haul in the international format. In April 2026, Brazil's Laura Cardoso took 9 wickets, the best bowling figures in an innings. Indonesia's Rohmalia Rohmalia (7 wickets for 0 runs against Mongolia), Nepal's Anjali Chand (6 for 0 against the Maldives), and Tanzania's Nasra Saidi (5 wickets for 0 runs against Mali), all three have the most economical bowling figures in women's T20Is with an economy rate of zero. Shabnim Ismail of South Africa took the least economical five-wicket haul, bowling with an economy rate of 7.82 against India in February 2018. At the age 51 years and 171 days, Joanne Hicks of Isle of Man is the oldest player to take five wickets in an innings while Botsogo Mpedi of Botswana who returned figures of 6 for 8 against Lesotho during the Botswana 7s tournament in Gaborone in August 2018, is the youngest at 15 years and 198 days. Mpedi alongside Chand, Indonesia's Dara Paramitha, Zimbabwe's Esther Mbofana, Samoa's Teinemane Faimalo and Rohmalia are the only bowlers to take a five-wicket haul on WT20I debut. There have been only 15 occurrences in which a five-wicket haul did not result in a victory to the team.

As of November 2026, 156 five-wicket hauls have been taken by 134 different players. Kary Chan of Hong Kong has taken four five-wicket hauls in WT20Is. (Note: The ICC granted full women's Twenty20 International status to all its members as 1 July 2018.)

== Key ==
Key
Symbol	Meaning
Bowler	The bowler who took the five-wicket haul
†	The bowler was named player of the match
↑	The bowler's debut match
Wkts	Number of wickets taken
Runs	Number of runs conceded
Overs	Number of overs bowled
Econ	Economy rate (runs conceded per over)
Inn	Innings in which the five-wicket haul was taken
Team	The team the bowler was representing
Opposition	The team the bowler was playing against
Venue	The cricket ground where the match was played
Date	Day on which the match was held
Batters	Batters whose wickets were taken
Result	Result for the team for which the five-wicket haul was taken
	Light blue background indicates this happened during a Women's T20 World Cup match.

== Five-wicket hauls ==
List of five-wicket hauls in women's Twenty20 International cricket
No.	Bowler	Wkts	Runs	Overs	Econ	Inn	Team	Opposition	Venue	Date	Result	Ref.
1	Amy Satterthwaite †	6	17	4	4.25	2	New Zealand	England	County Ground, Taunton, England	16 August 2007	Won	
2	Priyanka Roy †	5	16	3.5	4.17	1	India	Pakistan	County Ground, Taunton, England	13 June 2009	Won	
3	Anisa Mohammed † (1/3)	5	10	4	2.50	2	West Indies	South Africa	Newlands Cricket Ground, Cape Town, South Africa	26 October 2009	Won	
4	Anya Shrubsole †	5	11	4	2.75	1	England	New Zealand	Wellington Regional Stadium, Wellington, New Zealand	17 February 2012	Won	
5	Jhulan Goswami (Note: No player of the match was awarded.)	5	11	3.5	2.86	1	India	Australia	ACA–VDCA Cricket Stadium, Visakhapatnam, India	23 March 2012	Won	
6	Julie Hunter	5	22	3.2	6.60	2	Australia	West Indies	R. Premadasa Stadium, Colombo, Sri Lanka	5 October 2012	Won	
7	Shanel Daley	5	15	4	3.75	2	West Indies	Sri Lanka	R. Premadasa Stadium, Colombo, Sri Lanka	5 March 2013	Won	
8	Anisa Mohammed † (2/3)	5	12	4	3.00	2	West Indies	New Zealand	Kensington Oval, Bridgetown, Barbados	14 October 2013	Won	
9	Shaquana Quintyne †	5	16	4	4.00	2	West Indies	England	Kensington Oval, Bridgetown, Barbados	18 October 2013	Won	
10	Jenny Gunn †	5	18	4	4.50	2	England	New Zealand	Kensington Oval, Bridgetown, Barbados	22 October 2013	Won	
11	Suné Luus † (1/2)	5	8	4	2.00	2	South Africa	Ireland	M. A. Chidambaram Stadium, Chennai, India	23 March 2016	Won	
12	Molly Strano	5	10	4	2.50	1	Australia	New Zealand	Kardinia Park, Geelong, Australia	19 February 2017	Lost	
13	Afy Fletcher †	5	13	3.4	3.54	2	West Indies	Sri Lanka	Coolidge Cricket Ground, St George, Antigua and Barbuda	21 October 2017	Won	
14	Shabnim Ismail † (1/2)	5	30	3.5	7.82	1	South Africa	India	Wanderers Stadium, Johannesburg, South Africa	18 February 2018	Won	
15	Nida Dar †	5	21	4	5.25	2	Pakistan	Sri Lanka	Kinrara Academy Oval, Kuala Lumpur, Malaysia	6 June 2018	Won	
16	Wongpaka Liengprasert †	5	12	4	3.00	1	Thailand	Sri Lanka	Royal Selangor Club, Kuala Lumpur, Malaysia	9 June 2018 (Note: This match was part of the 2018 Women's Twenty20 Asia Cup which was retrospectively granted WT20I status by the ICC one month after the tournament was concluded.)	Won	
17	Jahanara Alam	5	28	4	7.00	1	Bangladesh	Ireland	Claremont Road Cricket Ground, Dublin, Ireland	28 June 2018	Won	
18	Panna Ghosh †	5	16	4	4.00	2	Bangladesh	Ireland	Sportpark Maarschalkerweerd, Utrecht, Netherlands	14 July 2018	Won	
19	Botsogo Mpedi † ↑	6	8	2.3	3.20	2	Botswana	Lesotho	Botswana Cricket Association Oval 1, Gaborone, Botswana	20 August 2018	Won	
20	Anisa Mohammed † (3/3)	5	24	4	6.00	1	West Indies	South Africa	Brian Lara Cricket Academy, San Fernando, Trinidad and Tobago	28 September 2018	Won	
21	Deandra Dottin †	5	5	3.4	1.36	2	West Indies	Bangladesh	Providence Stadium, Providence, Guyana	9 November 2018	Won	
22	Zon Lin †	6	10	4	2.50	1	Myanmar	Indonesia	Asian Institute of Technology Ground, Bangkok, Thailand	13 January 2019	Lost	
23	Chanida Sutthiruang	5	4	4	1.00	2	Thailand	Indonesia	Asian Institute of Technology Ground, Bangkok, Thailand	15 January 2019	Won	
24	Mas Elysa †	6	3	4	0.75	1	Malaysia	China	Asian Institute of Technology Ground, Bangkok, Thailand	16 January 2019	Won	
25	Suné Luus † (2/2)	5	14	3.4	3.81	1	South Africa	Sri Lanka	Wanderers Stadium, Johannesburg, South Africa	3 February 2019	Won	
26	Chamani Seneviratne †	5	3	4	0.75	2	United Arab Emirates	Kuwait	Asian Institute of Technology Ground, Bangkok, Thailand	19 February 2019	Won	
27	Nary Thapa †	6	8	4	2.00	1	Nepal	Hong Kong	Asian Institute of Technology Ground, Bangkok, Thailand	24 February 2019	Won	
28	Queentor Abel † (1/2)	5	18	2.5	6.35	1	Kenya	Uganda	Lugogo Stadium, Kampala, Uganda	6 April 2019	Lost	
29	Ravina Oa †	5	13	4	3.25	2	Papua New Guinea	Vanuatu	Independence Park, Port Vila, Vanuatu	6 May 2019	Won	
30	Natasha Ambo †	5	10	4	2.50	1	Papua New Guinea	Indonesia	Independence Park, Port Vila, Vanuatu	6 May 2019	Won	
31	Kaia Arua † (1/2)	5	7	4	1.75	1	Papua New Guinea	Japan	Independence Park, Port Vila, Vanuatu	9 May 2019	Won	
32	Nasra Saidi	5	0	2.5	0.00	2	Tanzania	Mali	Gahanga International Cricket Stadium, Kigali, Rwanda	22 June 2019	Won	
33	Emmanuelle Brelivet	5	14	4	3.50	1	France	Austria	Cricket Ground, Parc du Grand Blottereau, Nantes, France	1 August 2019	Won	
34	Kary Chan † (1/4)	5	7	3.3	2.00	2	Hong Kong	China	Yeonhui Cricket Ground, Incheon, South Korea	19 September 2019	Won	
35	Triphonia Luka	5	16	4	4.00	1	Malawi	Mozambique	Saint Andrews International High School, Blantyre, Malawi	7 November 2019	Won	
36	Paula Mazuze	5	19	4	4.75	2	Mozambique	Malawi	Saint Andrews International High School, Blantyre, Malawi	8 November 2019	Lost	
37	Anjali Chand † ↑	6	0	2.1	0.00	1	Nepal	Maldives	Pokhara Stadium, Pokhara, Nepal	2 December 2019	Won	
38	Agung Laksmi	5	5	3	1.66	1	Indonesia	Philippines	Friendship Oval, Dasmariñas, Philippines	21 December 2019	Won	
39	Ni Suwandewi ↑	5	8	4	2.00	2	Indonesia	Philippines	Friendship Oval, Dasmariñas, Philippines	22 December 2019	Won	
40	Jess Jonassen †	5	12	4	2.25	2	Australia	India	Junction Oval, Melbourne, Australia	12 February 2020	Won	
41	Emma Bargna	5	9	4	3.00	2	Germany	Austria	Seebarn Cricket Ground, Lower Austria, Austria	13 August 2020	Won	
42	Anuradha Doddaballapur	5	1	3	0.33	2	Germany	Austria	Seebarn Cricket Ground, Lower Austria, Austria	14 August 2020	Won	
43	Shabnim Ismail † (2/2)	5	12	4	3.00	2	South Africa	Pakistan	Kingsmead, Durban, South Africa	31 January 2021	Won	
44	Sarah Wetoto † (1/2)	5	12	4	3.00	1	Kenya	Botswana	Gahanga International Cricket Stadium, Kigali, Rwanda	7 June 2021	Won	
45	Sarah Wetoto † (2/2)	6	16	3.5	4.17	1	Kenya	Namibia	Gahanga International Cricket Stadium, Kigali, Rwanda	12 June 2021	Won	
46	Frederique Overdijk †	7	3	4	0.75	1	Netherlands	France	La Manga Club, Cartagena, Spain	26 August 2021	Won	
47	Megan McColl †	5	3	4	0.75	1	Scotland	France	La Manga Club, Cartagena, Spain	30 August 2021	Won	
48	Shameelah Mosweu †	6	3	4	0.75	2	Botswana	Mozambique	Botswana Cricket Association Oval 1, Gaborone, Botswana	10 September 2021	Won	
49	Esther Mbofana †	6	11	4	2.75	1	Zimbabwe	Eswatini	Botswana Cricket Association Oval 1, Gaborone, Botswana	11 September 2021	Won	
50	Loryn Phiri †	5	6	4	1.50	2	Zimbabwe	Botswana	Botswana Cricket Association Oval 1, Gaborone, Botswana	12 September 2021	Won	
51	Wilka Mwatile †	5	6	4	1.50	1	Namibia	Cameroon	Botswana Cricket Association Oval 2, Gaborone, Botswana	14 September 2021	Won	
52	Khushi Sharma †	5	22	4	5.50	2	United Arab Emirates	Bhutan	ICC Academy Ground 2, Dubai, UAE	25 November 2021	Won	
53	Nahida Akter † (1/2)	5	12	3.4	3.27	2	Bangladesh	Kenya	Kinrara Academy Oval, Kuala Lumpur, Malaysia	19 January 2022	Won	
54	Maria Jasvi †	5	6	3	2.00	1	Kuwait	Saudi Arabia	Oman Cricket Academy Ground Turf 2, Muscat, Oman	20 March 2022	Won	
55	Amanda Dcosta	5	11	3	3.67	2	Oman	Kuwait	Oman Cricket Academy Ground Turf 1, Muscat, Oman	24 March 2022	Won	
56	Phiona Kulume †	6	11	4	2.75	1	Uganda	Namibia	Trans Namib Ground, Windhoek, Namibia	23 April 2022	Lost	
57	Sune Wittmann	5	10	4	2.50	2	Namibia	Uganda	Trans Namib Ground, Windhoek, Namibia	23 April 2022	Won	
58	Nomvelo Sibanda †	5	14	3.3	4.00	1	Zimbabwe	Namibia	Trans Namib Ground, Windhoek, Namibia	26 April 2022	Won	
59	Mahadewa Pathirannehelage †	5	16	5	4.00	2	Austria	Spain	Dreux Sports Cricket Club, Dreux, France	5 May 2022	Won	
60	Patricia Malemikia †	5	6	4	1.50	1	Uganda	Nigeria	IPRC Cricket Ground, Kigali, Rwanda	12 June 2022	Won	
61	Asmina Karmacharya	5	10	3.5	2.60	1	Nepal	United Arab Emirates	Kinrara Academy Oval, Kuala Lumpur, Malaysia	24 June 2022	No result	
62	Elena Predescu	5	9	4	2.25	2	Romania	Serbia	Moara Vlasiei Cricket Ground, Ilfov County, Romania	10 September 2022	Won	
63	Hollan Doriga	5	2	1.4	1.20	2	Papua New Guinea	Fiji	Vanuatu Cricket Ground (Oval 2), Port Vila, Vanuatu	3 October 2022	Won	
64	Kaia Arua (2/2)	5	11	4	2.75	1	Papua New Guinea	Vanuatu	Vanuatu Cricket Ground (Oval 2), Port Vila, Vanuatu	5 October 2022	Won	
65	Henao Thomas	5	13	3.5	3.39	2	Papua New Guinea	Fiji	Vanuatu Cricket Ground, Port Vila, Vanuatu	5 October 2022	Won	
66	Omaima Sohail †	5	13	4	3.25	1	Pakistan	Sri Lanka	Sylhet International Cricket Stadium, Sylhet, Bangladesh	11 October 2022	Won	
67	Alison Stocks †	7	3	3.4	0.81	1	Argentina	Peru	Sao Fernando Polo and Cricket Club, Itaguaí, Brazil	14 October 2022	Won	
68	Gunjan Shukla †	5	7	3	2.33	1	Sweden	Isle of Man	Desert Springs Cricket Ground, Almería, Spain	14 November 2022	Won	
69	Phoup Srey Pheak	6	9	2.3	3.60	1	Cambodia	Philippines	ISF Sports Ground, Phnom Penh, Cambodia	21 December 2022	Won	
70	Megan Schutt †	5	15	4	3.75	1	Australia	Pakistan	North Sydney Oval, Sydney, Australia	24 January 2023	Won	
71	Ada Bhasin † (1/2)	5	6	3	2.00	1	Singapore	Cambodia	Morodok Techo National Stadium, Phnom Penh, Cambodia	8 February 2023	Won	
72	Ashleigh Gardner †	5	12	3	4.00	1	Australia	New Zealand	Boland Park, Paarl, South Africa	11 February 2023	Won	
73	Renuka Singh	5	15	4	3.75	1	India	England	St George's Park, Gqeberha, South Africa	18 February 2023	Lost	
74	Henriette Ishimwe † (1/2)	5	6	2.3	2.40	2	Rwanda	Cameroon	Tafawa Balewa Square Cricket Oval, Lagos, Nigeria	31 March 2023	Won	
75	Ainna Hamizah Hashim †	5	4	4	1.00	2	Malaysia	Myanmar	AZ Group Cricket Oval, Phnom Penh, Cambodia	14 May 2023	Won	
76	Alison Siu †	5	8	4	2.00	1	Hong Kong	China	Pingfeng Campus Cricket Field, Hangzhou, China	28 May 2023	Won	
77	Chloe Greechan †	5	4	4	1.0	2	Jersey	Sweden	FB Fields, St Clement, Jersey	2 June 2023	Won	
78	Thipatcha Putthawong † (1/3)	5	8	3.5	2.08	1	Thailand	Netherlands	Sportpark Maarschalkerweerd, Utrecht, Netherlands	14 July 2023	Won	
79	Aggeliki Savvani †	6	5	2.5	1.76	2	Greece	Romania	Moara Vlasiei Cricket Ground, Moara Vlăsiei, Romania	5 August 2023	Won	
80	Arlene Kelly †	5	12	4	3.00	1	Ireland	Netherlands	VRA Cricket Ground, Amstelveen, Netherlands	14 August 2023	Won	
81	Sita Rana Magar † (1/2)	5	16	4	4.00	1	Nepal	Hong Kong	Bayuemas Oval, Pandamaran, Malaysia	22 August 2023	Won	
82	Xiuli Jin †	5	15	4	3.75	1	China	Kuwait	Bayuemas Oval, Pandamaran, Malaysia	31 August 2023	Lost	
83	Nattaya Boochatham †	5	5	4	1.25	2	Thailand	Myanmar	Bayuemas Oval, Pandamaran, Malaysia	1 September 2023	Won	
84	Teinemane Faimalo †	5	8	4	2.00	1	Samoa	Fiji	Vanuatu Cricket Ground (Oval 2), Port Vila, Vanuatu	1 September 2023	Lost	
85	Kary Chan † (2/4)	5	4	3	1.33	1	Hong Kong	Kuwait	Bayuemas Oval, Pandamaran, Malaysia	3 September 2023	Won	
86	Goabilwe Matome	6	1	3	0.33	2	Botswana	Lesotho	Botswana Cricket Association Oval 2, Gaborone, Botswana	3 September 2023	Won	
87	Queentor Abel† (2/2)	5	5	4	1.25	2	Kenya	Cameroon	Botswana Cricket Association Oval 1, Gaborone, Botswana	6 September 2023	Won	
88	Nahida Akter † (2/2)	5	8	3.4	2.18	1	Bangladesh	Pakistan	Zohur Ahmed Chowdhury Stadium, Chittagong, Bangladesh	25 October 2023	Won	
89	Kary Chan † (3/4)	5	10	2.5	3.52	1	Hong Kong	Japan	Hong Kong Cricket Club, Wong Nai Chung Gap, Hong Kong	15 November 2023	Won	
90	Sangita Rai †	5	6	4	1.50	2	Nepal	Japan	Hong Kong Cricket Club, Wong Nai Chung Gap, Hong Kong	18 November 2023	Won	
91	Mariko Hill †	5	2	1.4	1.20	1	Hong Kong	Tanzania	Hong Kong Cricket Club, Wong Nai Chung Gap, Hong Kong	19 November 2023	Won	
92	Shorna Akter †	5	28	4	7.0	2	Bangladesh	South Africa	Willowmoore Park, Benoni, South Africa	3 December 2023	Won	
93	Precious Marange †	5	7	4	1.75	1	Zimbabwe	Uganda	Entebbe Cricket Oval, Entebbe, Uganda	17 December 2023	Won	
94	Ada Bhasin (2/2)	5	7	4	1.75	1	Singapore	Philippines	Friendship Oval, Dasmariñas, Philippines	29 December 2023	Won	
95	Selina Solman	5	9	4	2.25	2	Vanuatu	Cook Islands	Lloyd Elsmore Park 1, Auckland, New Zealand	19 January 2024	Won	
96	Mahirah Izzati Ismail †	5	11	4	2.75	2	Malaysia	Bahrain	Bayuemas Oval, Pandamaran, Malaysia	13 February 2024	Won	
97	Rohmalia Rohmalia †	7	0	3.2	0.00	2	Indonesia	Mongolia	Udayana Cricket Ground, Jimbaran, Indonesia	24 April 2024	Won	
98	Rachel Slater †	5	17	4.0	4.25	2	Scotland	Uganda	Tolerance Oval, Abu Dhabi, United Arab Emirates	25 April 2024	Won	
99	Hannah Eulenkamp	6	6	3.0	2.00	1	Guernsey	Isle of Man	Norman Edwards Memorial Ground, Winchester, England	5 May 2024	Won	
100	Marie Bimenyimana † (1/2)	5	3	4.0	0.75	1	Rwanda	Malawi	Gahanga B Ground, Kigali, Rwanda	31 May 2024	Won	
101	Alice Ikuzwe †	5	12	3.3	3.42	2	Rwanda	Kenya	Gahanga B Ground, Kigali, Rwanda	3 June 2024	Won	
102	Lillian Udeh †	6	7	4	1.74	2	Nigeria	Rwanda	Gahanga International Cricket Stadium, Kigali, Rwanda	4 June 2024	Won	
103	Henriette Ishimwe (2/2)	5	17	4	4.25	1	Rwanda	Uganda	Gahanga International Cricket Stadium, Kigali, Rwanda	5 June 2024	Lost	
104	Annemari Vessik	5	12	4	3.00	1	Estonia	Norway	Ekeberg Cricket Ground 1, Oslo, Norway	10 August 2024	Lost	
105	Joanne Hicks (1/3)	5	10	4.0	2.50	1	Isle of Man	Malta	Marsa Sports Club, Marsa, Malta	18 August 2024	Won	
106	Joanne Hicks (2/3)	5	22	4.0	5.50	2	Isle of Man	Greece	Marsa Sports Club, Marsa, Malta	24 August 2024	Won	
107	Kudzai Chigora †	5	7	4.0	1.75	1	Zimbabwe	United Arab Emirates	Wanderers Cricket Ground, Windhoek, Namibia	7 September 2024	Won	
108	Fatima Zahra	5	2	3.2	0.60	2	Sweden	Malta	Roma Cricket Ground, Rome, Italy	27 September 2024	Won	
109	Aliza Saleem †	5	6	4	1.50	1	Spain	Croatia	Mladost Cricket Ground, Zagreb, Croatia	26 October 2024	Won	
110	Phannita Maya †	5	3	3.1	0.94	2	Thailand	China	Mission Road Ground, Mong Kok, Hong Kong	7 December 2024	Won	
111	Sita Rana Magar (2/2)	5	12	3	4.00	1	Nepal	Netherlands	Tribhuvan University International Cricket Ground, Kirtipur, Nepal	2 February 2025	Lost	
112	Sarah Akiteng †	5	14	4	3.50	2	Uganda	Namibia	Entebbe Cricket Oval, Entebbe, Uganda	10 March 2025	Won	
113	Nicole Monteiro †	5	7	4	1.75	2	Brazil	Argentina	Club San Albano, Burzaco, Argentina	10 March 2025	Won	
114	Olive Lefaga †	6	8	4	2.00	1	Samoa	France	N'Du Stadium, Nouméa, New Caledonia	12 March 2025	Won	
115	Carolina Nascimento †	5	12	4	3.00	1	Brazil	Argentina	Club San Albano, Burzaco, Argentina	17 March 2025	Won	
116	Samanthi Dunukedeniya †	7	15	3.5	3.91	2	Czech Republic	Cyprus	Vinoř Cricket Ground, Prague, Czechia	2 May 2025	Won	
117	Viktoria Frey †	5	13	4	3.25	1	Estonia	Bulgaria	Estonian National Cricket and Rugby Field, Tallinn, Estonia	15 May 2025	Won	
118	Kevin Amuge †	5	19	4	4.75	1	Uganda	Sierra Leone	Gahanga B Ground, Kigali, Rwanda	6 June 2025	Won	
119	Erika Toguchi-Quinn † (1/2)	5	14	4	3.50	2	Japan	Hong Kong	Sano International Cricket Ground, Sano, Japan	8 June 2025	Won	
120	Stephani Nampiina †	6	8	4	2.00	2	Uganda	Malawi	Gahanga International Cricket Stadium, Kigali, Rwanda	8 June 2025	Won	
121	Marie Bimenyimana (2/2)	5	6	3	2.00	1	Rwanda	Tanzania	Gahanga International Cricket Stadium, Kigali, Rwanda	13 June 2025	Lost	
122	Rayline Ova	5	14	3.3	4.00	2	Vanuatu	Samoa	Amini Park, Port Moresby, Papua New Guinea	19 June 2025	Won	
123	Maria Syrioti †	5	20	4	5.00	1	Greece	Serbia	Vasil Levski National Sports Academy, Sofia, Bulgaria	8 July 2025	Won	
124	Arlene Kelly †	5	14	3.5	3.65	1	Ireland	Netherlands	Hazelaarweg Stadium, Rotterdam, Netherlands	26 August 2025	Won	
125	Mirab Razwan †	6	7	2.5	2.47	1	Norway	Finland	Ishoj Cricket Club, Ishøj, Denmark	30 August 2025	Won	
126	Janet Ronalds †	5	7	3.1	2.21	2	Germany	Norway	Ishoj Cricket Club, Ishøj, Denmark	30 August 2025	Won	
127	Melvin Khagoitsa †	5	13	4	3.25	1	Kenya	Tanzania	High Performance Oval, Windhoek, Namibia	1 September 2025	Lost	
128	Josephine Nkomo †	5	6	4	1.50	1	Zimbabwe	Nigeria	High Performance Oval, Windhoek, Namibia	3 September 2025	Won	
129	Erika Toguchi-Quinn † (2/2)	5	6	3.3	1.71	2	Japan	Fiji	Albert Park Ground 1, Suva, Fiji	6 September 2025	Won	
130	Pauke Siaka	5	1	3.4	0.27	2	Papua New Guinea	Philippines	Albert Park Ground 1, Suva, Fiji	10 September 2025	Won	
131	Achini Perera †	5	10	4	2.50	2	Canada	Tanzania	Gymkhana Club Ground, Dar es Salaam, Tanzania	5 November 2025	Won	
132	Onnicha Kamchomphu †	5	18	4	4.50	2	Thailand	Namibia	Terdthai Cricket Ground, Bangkok, Thailand	14 November 2025	Won	
133	Thipatcha Putthawong † (2/3)	5	6	3.3	1.71	1	Thailand	Uganda	Asian Institute of Technology Ground, Bangkok, Thailand	26 November 2025	Won	
134	Chloe Abel †	5	13	4	3.25	1	Scotland	Papua New Guinea	Asian Institute of Technology Ground, Bangkok, Thailand	26 November 2025	Won	
135	Olivia Bell	5	8	4	2.00	2	Scotland	Thailand	Asian Institute of Technology Ground, Bangkok, Thailand	30 November 2025	Lost	
136	Elsa Hunter	5	9	4	2.25	2	Malaysia	Indonesia	Terdthai Cricket Ground, Bangkok, Thailand	15 December 2025	Won	
137	Christabel Chatonzwa †	5	22	4	5.50	1	Zimbabwe	Netherlands	Tribhuvan University International Cricket Ground, Kirtipur, Nepal	18 January 2026	Lost	
138	Maria Ribeiro	5	14	4	3.50	2	Brazil	Zambia	Botswana Cricket Association Oval 2, Gaborone, Botswana	8 April 2026	Won	
139	Laura Cardoso †	9	4	3	1.33	2	Brazil	Lesotho	Botswana Cricket Association Oval 2, Gaborone, Botswana	9 April 2026	Won	
140	Lindsay Boas †	5	10	3.3	2.85	1	Brazil	Mozambique	Botswana Cricket Association Oval 1, Gaborone, Botswana	10 April 2026	Won	
141	Deepti Sharma † (1/2)	5	19	4	4.75	2	India	South Africa	Wanderers Stadium, Johannesburg, South Africa	25 April 2026	Won	
142	Yerin Molina †	5	13	3.4	3.54	1	Costa Rica	Chile	Los Reyes Polo Club, Guácima, Costa Rica	26 April 2026	Won	
143	Kabita Kunwar †	6	5	3.4	1.36	2	Nepal	Vanuatu	Gahanga International Cricket Stadium, Kigali, Rwanda	30 April 2026	Won	
144	Kary Chan (4/4)	5	15	4	3.75	2	Hong Kong	Malaysia	Mission Road Ground, Mong Kok, Hong Kong	10 May 2026	Won	
145	Thipatcha Putthawong † (3/3)	5	3	4	0.75	1	Thailand	Mongolia	Selangor Turf Club, Kuala Lumpur, Malaysia	3 June 2026	Won	
146	Priyanka Mendonca †	5	8	4	2.00	1	Oman	Saudi Arabia	UKM-YSD Cricket Oval, Bangi, Malaysia	6 June 2026	Won	
147	Sunida Chaturongrattana †	5	3	3	1.00	1	Thailand	Myanmar	Bayuemas Oval, Pandamaran, Malaysia	7 June 2026	Won	
148	Deepti Sharma † (2/2)	5	10	4	2.50	2	India	Pakistan	Edgbaston Cricket Ground, Birmingham, England	14 June 2026	Won	
149	Joanne Hicks † (3/3)	5	10	4	2.50	1	Isle of Man	Greece	Moara Vlasei Cricket Ground, Ilfov County, Romania	27 August 2026	Won	
150	Chamari Athapaththu †	7	5	3.3	1.42	2	Sri Lanka	Indonesia	Dubai International Cricket Stadium, Dubai, United Arab Emirates	2 September 2026	Won	
151	Viola Komeda	5	14	3.2	4.20	1	Czech Republic	Portugal	Vinoř Cricket Ground, Prague, Czech Republic	4 September 2026	Won	
152	Nashra Sandhu †	6	7	4	1.75	2	Pakistan	Hong Kong	Dubai International Cricket Stadium, Dubai, United Arab Emirates	7 September 2026	Won	
153	Annerie Dercksen	5	15	4	3.75	2	South Africa	Zimbabwe	Queens Sports Club, Bulawayo, Zimbabwe	15 September 2026	Won	
154	Francesca Galan †	5	5	4	1.25	2	Argentina	Mexico	Texcoco Municipal Baseball Complex, Texcoco de Mora, Mexico	24 October 2026	Won	
155	Jurriene Diergaardt †	5	21	4	5.25	2	Namibia	United States	Entebbe Cricket Oval, Entebbe, Uganda	7 November 2026	Won	
156	Christine Mutasa †	6	10	4	2.50	2	Zimbabwe	Thailand	Karwan Sports Club Cricket Ground, Ajman, United Arab Emirates	15 November 2026	Won	
