= 2023 Hong Kong Women's Quadrangular Series =

International cricket tournament

- Dates: 15 – 19 November 2023
- Administrator: Hong Kong Cricket Association
- Cricket format: Twenty20 International
- Tournament format(s): Round-robin and final
- Host: Hong Kong
- Champions: Hong Kong
- Runners-up: Tanzania
- Participants: 4
- Matches: 8
- Most runs: (Hong Kong) Natasha Miles (112)
- Most wickets: (Hong Kong) Kary Chan (10)

The 2023 Hong Kong Women's Quadrangular Series was a Twenty20 International (T20I) cricket tournament which took place in Hong Kong in November 2023. The participating teams were the hosts Hong Kong along with Japan, Nepal and Tanzania. The matches were played at the Hong Kong Cricket Club in Wong Nai Chung Gap.

Hong Kong finished top of the round-robin stage after winning all of their matches, including a 10-wicket win over Tanzania. Hong Kong defeated Tanzania by 5 wickets in the final.

== Squads ==
Hong Kong	Japan	Nepal	Tanzania
Kary Chan (c); Natasha Miles (vc); Maryam Bibi; Betty Chan; Shing Chan; Hiu Ying Cheung (wk); Mya Gardner; Mariko Hill; Elysa Hubbard; Emma Lai; Iqra Sahar; Shanzeen Shahzad (wk); Alison Siu; Ruchitha Venkatesh	Mai Yanagida (c); Akari Nishimura (vc, wk); Ahilya Chandel; Ayumi Fujikawa; Kiyo Fujikawa; Hinase Goto; Palak Gundecha; Ruan Kanai; Elena Kusuda-Nairn; Meg Ogawa; Shrunali Ranade; Seika Sumi; Erika Toguchi-Quinn; Nonoha Yasumoto	Indu Barma (c); Bindu Rawal (vc); Suman Bist; Rubina Chhetry; Khushi Dangol; Asmina Karmacharya; Samjhana Khadka; Sita Rana Magar; Puja Mahato; Sony Pakhrin; Sangita Rai; Kajal Shrestha (wk); Kanchan Shrestha; Roma Thapa	Fatuma Kibasu (c); Saum Borakambi; Saumu Hussein (wk); Sophia Jerome; Perice Kamunya; Sheila Kizito; Aisha Mohamed; Shufaa Mohamedi (wk); Saum Mtae; Hudaa Omary; Monica Pascal; Neema Pius; Mwajabu Salum; Mwanamvua Ushanga

== Round-robin ==
=== Points table ===
Pos	Team	Pld	W	L	NR	Pts	NRR	Qualification
1	Hong Kong	3	3	0	0	6	3.147	Advanced to the final
2	Tanzania	3	2	1	0	4	1.896	Advanced to the final
3	Nepal	3	1	2	0	2	−0.166	Advanced to the 3rd place play-off
4	Japan	3	0	3	0	0	−4.000	Advanced to the 3rd place play-off

Source: ESPNcricinfo

=== Fixtures ===
15 November 2023
09:30
Scorecard

Tanzania; 115/7 (20 overs)	v	Nepal; 88 (16.5 overs)
Hudaa Omary 25 (26); Sangita Rai 2/16 (3 overs)		Sita Rana Magar 43 (31); Sophia Jerome 3/3 (2.5 overs)

Tanzania won by 27 runs
Hong Kong Cricket Club, Wong Nai Chung Gap
Umpires: John Prakash (HK) and Ramasamy Venkatesh (HK)
Player of the match: Sophia Jerome (Tan)

- Tanzania won the toss and elected to bat.
- Suman Bist (Nep) made her T20I debut.

15 November 2023
14:00
Scorecard

Japan; 78 (19.5 overs)	v	Hong Kong; 79/1 (10.4 overs)
Mai Yanagida 32 (46); Kary Chan 5/10 (2.5 overs)		Mariko Hill 40 (32); Shrunali Ranade 1/5 (1 over)

Hong Kong won by 9 wickets
Hong Kong Cricket Club, Wong Nai Chung Gap
Umpires: Tabarak Dar (HK) and Huang Zhuo (Chn)
Player of the match: Kary Chan (HK)

- Hong Kong won the toss and elected to field.
- Shrunali Ranade (Jpn) made her T20I debut.
- Kary Chan (HK) became the first player to take two hat-tricks in women's T20Is.

16 November 2023
09:30
Scorecard

Tanzania; 139/9 (20 overs)	v	Japan; 28 (15.5 overs)
Saum Mtae 36 (32); Erika Toguchi-Quinn 3/13 (4 overs)		Ruan Kanai 7 (26); Mwajabu Salum 2/6 (3 overs)

Tanzania won by 111 runs
Hong Kong Cricket Club, Wong Nai Chung Gap
Umpires: Shelton D'Cruz (HK) and Ramasamy Venkatesh (HK)
Player of the match: Saum Mtae (Tan)

- Japan won the toss and elected to field.
- Palak Gundecha (Jpn), Saumu Hussein and Mwajabu Salum (Tan) all made their T20I debuts.

16 November 2023
14:00
Scorecard

Nepal; 56 (18 overs)	v	Hong Kong; 57/1 (9 overs)
Rubina Chhetry 25 (30); Iqra Sahar 3/6 (4 overs)		Natasha Miles 30* (23)

Hong Kong won by 9 wickets
Hong Kong Cricket Club, Wong Nai Chung Gap
Umpires: Tabarak Dar (HK) and John Prakash (HK)
Player of the match: Iqra Sahar (HK)

- Nepal won the toss and elected to bat.
- Kanchan Shrestha (Nep) made her T20I debut.
- Iqra Sahar (HK) took her first hat-trick in T20Is.

18 November 2023
09:30
Scorecard

Nepal; 113/4 (20 overs)	v	Japan; 46 (20 overs)
Rubina Chhetry 38 (32); Elena Kusuda-Nairn 2/24 (4 overs)		Meg Ogawa 17 (29); Sangita Rai 5/6 (4 overs)

Nepal won by 67 runs
Hong Kong Cricket Club, Wong Nai Chung Gap
Umpires: Niaz Ali (HK) and Huang Zhuo (Chn)
Player of the match: Sangita Rai (Nep)

- Japan won the toss and elected to field.
- Sony Pakhrin (Nep) made her T20I debut.
- Sangita Rai (Nep) took her first five-wicket haul in T20Is.

18 November 2023
14:00
Scorecard

Tanzania; 106/9 (20 overs)	v	Hong Kong; 107/0 (14.2 overs)
Neema Pius 34* (47); Kary Chan 4/16 (4 overs)		Mariko Hill 66* (49)

Hong Kong won by 10 wickets
Hong Kong Cricket Club, Wong Nai Chung Gap
Umpires: John Prakash (HK) and Shiroy Vachha (HK)
Player of the match: Mariko Hill (HK)

- Tanzania won the toss and elected to bat.
- Saum Borakambi (Tan) made her T20I debut.

== 3rd place play-off ==
19 November 2023
09:30
Scorecard

Nepal; 115/5 (20 overs)	v	Japan; 70/6 (20 overs)
Puja Mahato 43 (51); Erika Toguchi-Quinn 1/17 (4 overs)		Akari Nishimura 29 (51); Sony Pakhrin 1/2 (1 over)

Nepal won by 45 runs
Hong Kong Cricket Club, Wong Nai Chung Gap
Umpires: Jayanth Babu (HK) and Ramasamy Venkatesh (HK)
Player of the match: Puja Mahato (Nep)

- Nepal won the toss and elected to bat.

== Final ==
19 November 2023
14:00
Scorecard

Tanzania; 84 (18.4 overs)	v	Hong Kong; 86/5 (19.1 overs)
Monica Pascal 42 (49); Mariko Hill 5/2 (1.4 overs)		Natasha Miles 27 (41); Aisha Mohamed 2/9 (3 overs)

Hong Kong won by 5 wickets
Hong Kong Cricket Club, Wong Nai Chung Gap
Umpires: Shelton D'Cruz (HK) and John Prakash (HK)
Player of the match: Mariko Hill (HK)

- Hong Kong won the toss and elected to field.
- Mariko Hill (HK) took her first five-wicket haul in T20Is.
