= 2023 Women's Twenty20 East Asia Cup =

- Date: 25–28 May 2023
- Location: China
- Result: Hong Kong won the tournament
- Player of the series: (Hong Kong) Kary Chan
Teams
China	Hong Kong	Japan
Captains
Huang Zhuo	Kary Chan	Mai Yanagida
Most runs
Han Lili (91)	Kary Chan (77)	Erika Oda (73)
Most wickets
Yuanyuan Cai (8)	Betty Chan (11)	Kurumi Ota (7)

The 2023 Women's East Asia Cup was a Twenty20 International (T20I) cricket tournament that took place in Hangzhou, China, in May 2023. This was the fifth edition of the women's East Asia Cup, and saw China, Hong Kong and Japan play in a double round-robin, with the top two sides advancing to the final. South Korea were unable to compete for the second edition in a row, after they and China had also missed the 2022 tournament. The newly developed Zhejiang University of Technology Cricket Field hosted international cricket for the first time, with this tournament also acting as a test event ahead of the 2022 Asian Games, for which the venue was developed. Hong Kong were the defending champions, having defeated Japan 4–0 in a bilateral series in 2022.

Japan were eliminated after the round-robin stage, with several injuries affecting the team. Hong Kong retained the title by winning a super over following a tied game against China in the final. Alison Siu took five wickets for eight runs in the final Hong Kong and was named player of the match.

== Squads ==
China	Hong Kong	Japan
Huang Zhuo (c); Yuanyuan Cai; Xiuli Jin; Jiaping Li; Han Lili; Zheng Lili; Mengting Liu; Zi Mei; Xu Qian; Zhang Xiangxue; Chen Xinyu; Jing Yang (wk); Rongyu Zhao; Mingyue Zhu	Kary Chan (c); Maryam Bibi; Betty Chan; Charlotte Chan; Shing Chan; Amanda Cheung (wk); Hiu Ying Cheung (wk); Tammy Chu; Cindy Ho; Emma Lai; Heiley Liu; Shanzeen Shahzad (wk); Alison Siu; Yee Shan To	Mai Yanagida (c); Akari Nishimura (vc, wk); Ahilya Chandel; Ayumi Fujikawa; Kiyo Fujikawa; Hinase Goto; Haruna Iwasaki; Elena Kusuda-Nairn; Yukino Nakayama; Erika Oda; Kurumi Ota; Seika Sumi; Nonoha Yasumoto; Minami Yoshioka (wk)

== Round-robin ==
=== Points table ===
Pos	Team	Pld	W	L	NR	Pts	NRR	Qualification
1	Hong Kong	4	3	1	0	6	0.223	Advanced to the final
2	China	4	2	2	0	4	0.893	Advanced to the final
3	Japan	4	1	3	0	2	−1.141	

Source: ESPNcricinfo

=== Fixtures ===
25 May 2023
08:30
Scorecard

China; 101/6 (20 overs)	v	Hong Kong; 102/8 (18.3 overs)
Huang Zhuo 28 (31); Maryam Bibi 3/23 (4 overs)		Maryam Bibi 25* (16); Xu Qian 2/13 (4 overs)

Hong Kong won by 2 wickets
Zhejiang University of Technology Cricket Field, Hangzhou
Umpires: Niaz Ali (HK) and Sun Meng Yao (Chn)
Player of the match: Maryam Bibi (HK)

- Hong Kong won the toss and elected to field.
- Yuanyuan Cai, Xiuli Jin, Jiaping Li, Mengting Liu, Chen Xinyu, Jing Yang, Rongyu Zhao, Mingyue Zhu (Chn), Charlotte Chan, Shing Chan and Amanda Cheung (HK) all made their T20I debuts.

25 May 2023
15:30
Scorecard

Japan; 76/7 (20 overs)	v	Hong Kong; 77/4 (16.2 overs)
Erika Oda 25 (32); Cindy Ho 3/10 (4 overs)		Kary Chan 31* (39); Elena Kusuda-Nairn 2/14 (4 overs)

Hong Kong won by 6 wickets
Zhejiang University of Technology Cricket Field, Hangzhou
Umpires: Zhang Peng (Chn) and Gandhimathinathan Sankaranarayanan (HK)
Player of the match: Cindy Ho (HK)

- Japan won the toss and elected to bat.
- Elena Kusuda-Nairn and Kurumi Ota (Jpn) both made their T20I debuts.

26 May 2023
08:30
Scorecard

Japan; 106/4 (20 overs)	v	China; 95/8 (20 overs)
Erika Oda 46* (65); Chen Xinyu 1/14 (3 overs)		Huang Zhuo 30 (52); Ahilya Chandel 4/12 (4 overs)

Japan won by 11 runs
Zhejiang University of Technology Cricket Field, Hangzhou
Umpires: Niaz Ali (HK) and Gandhimathinathan Sankaranarayanan (HK)
Player of the match: Ahilya Chandel (Jpn)

- China won the toss and elected to field.
- Seika Sumi and Nonoha Yasumoto (Jpn) both made their T20I debuts.

26 May 2023
15:30
Scorecard

China; 109/9 (20 overs)	v	Hong Kong; 54 (15.5 overs)
Han Lili 35 (43); Betty Chan 3/13 (4 overs)		Yee Shan To 17 (22); Yuanyuan Cai 3/6 (2.5 overs)

China won by 55 runs
Zhejiang University of Technology Cricket Field, Hangzhou
Umpires: Niaz Ali (HK) and Sun Meng Yao (Chn)
Player of the match: Yuanyuan Cai (Chn)

- China won the toss and elected to bat.

27 May 2023
08:30
Scorecard

Hong Kong; 112/6 (20 overs)	v	Japan; 65 (19.3 overs)
Kary Chan 31 (27); Elena Kusuda-Nairn 2/14 (3 overs)		Ayumi Fujikawa 17 (39); Maryam Bibi 3/8 (4 overs)

Hong Kong won by 47 runs
Zhejiang University of Technology Cricket Field, Hangzhou
Umpires: Gandhimathinathan Sankaranarayanan (HK) and Ge Tao (Chn)
Player of the match: Kary Chan (HK)

- Japan won the toss and elected to field.
- Yukino Nakayama (Jpn) made her T20I debut.

27 May 2023
15:30
Scorecard

China; 117/7 (20 overs)	v	Japan; 82/9 (20 overs)
Zheng Lili 21 (33); Kurumi Ota 2/25 (4 overs)		Akari Nishimura 21 (23); Yuanyuan Cai 3/18 (4 overs)

China won by 35 runs
Zhejiang University of Technology Cricket Field, Hangzhou
Umpires: Niaz Ali (HK) and Zhang Peng (Chn)
Player of the match: Zheng Lili (Chn)

- China won the toss and elected to bat.

== Final ==
28 May 2023
09:30
Scorecard

China; 72 (17 overs)	v	Hong Kong; 72/9 (20 overs)
Huang Zhuo 23 (32); Alison Siu 5/8 (4 overs)		Shanzeen Shahzad 26 (41); Xu Qian 2/8 (4 overs)

Match tied
(Hong Kong won the Super Over)
Zhejiang University of Technology Cricket Field, Hangzhou
Umpires: Niaz Ali (HK) and Sun Meng Yao (Chn)
Player of the match: Alison Siu (HK)

- Hong Kong won the toss and elected to field.
- Alison Siu (HK) took her first five-wicket haul in T20Is.
- Super Over: Hong Kong 15/0, China 4/2.
