= 2022 Women's Twenty20 East Asia Cup =

International cricket tour

	Japan	Hong Kong
- Dates: 27 – 30 October 2022
Captains	Mai Yanagida	Kary Chan (Note: Yasmin Daswani captained Hong Kong in the last three WT20Is.)

Twenty20 International series
- Results: Hong Kong won the 4-match series 4–0
Most runs	Akari Kano (75)	Natasha Miles (149)
Most wickets	Mai Yanagida (3); Shizuka Miyaji (3)	Betty Chan (6)
- Player of the series: Mariko Hill (HK)

The 2022 Women's East Asia Cup was a Women's Twenty20 International (WT20I) cricket tournament held in Kaizuka, Osaka, Japan from 27 to 30 October 2022. This was the fourth edition of the women's East Asia Cup, and was originally scheduled to involve the same teams as in all previous editions, namely China, Hong Kong, Japan and South Korea. China and South Korea both withdrew from this year's tournament, and so Japan and Hong Kong played a four-match series to determine the winner. The four member countries signed an agreement in 2021 to make the women's East Asia Cup an annual event, but the 2021 event (which would have been played in Hong Kong) was cancelled due to COVID-19. China won the previous tournament in 2019.

Hong Kong were comfortable winners by 8 wickets in the first game. The second game ended with the same result, with Hong Kong's Mariko Hill scoring an unbeaten 51. Hong Kong took an unassailable lead in the series by winning the third game, helped by an unbeaten 86 from Natasha Miles. An improved performance by the hosts saw Japan fall short by just 3 runs, with Akari Kano scoring an unbeaten half-century. The last match of the series ended in a tie, with Hong Kong winning in the Super Over to take the series 4–0.

== Squads ==
Japan	Hong Kong
Mai Yanagida (c); Ahilya Chandel; Ayumi Fujikawa; Kiyo Fujikawa; Hinase Goto; Haruna Iwasaki; Ayaka Kanada; Ruan Kanai; Akari Kano (wk); Shimako Kato; Shizuka Miyaji; Mako Munakata; Erika Oda; Meg Ogawa; Minami Yoshioka	Kary Chan (c); Maryam Bibi; Georgina Bradley; Betty Chan; Hiu Ying Cheung (wk); Tammy Chu; Yasmin Daswani (wk); Mariko Hill; Cindy Ho; Emma Lai; Natasha Miles; Iqra Sahar; Shanzeen Shahzad (wk); Ruchitha Venkatesh

== WT20I series ==
=== 1st WT20I ===
27 October 2022
11:00
Scorecard

Japan; 90/7 (20 overs)	v	Hong Kong; 91/2 (14 overs)
Shimako Kato 15 (16); Maryam Bibi 2/7 (4 overs)		Mariko Hill 40 (32); Mai Yanagida 1/11 (2 overs)

Hong Kong won by 8 wickets
Kaizuka Cricket Ground, Kaizuka
Umpires: Adam Birss (Jpn) and Dhakshinamoorthy Natarajan (Jpn)
Player of the match: Mariko Hill (HK)

- Hong Kong won the toss and elected to field.
- Ahilya Chandel, Hinase Goto, Haruna Iwasaki, Shimako Kato and Mako Munakata (Jpn) all made their WT20I debuts.

=== 2nd WT20I ===
28 October 2022
11:00
Scorecard

Japan; 91 (19.2 overs)	v	Hong Kong; 93/2 (13.2 overs)
Shimako Kato 28 (36); Betty Chan 4/13 (3.2 overs)		Mariko Hill 51* (39); Ahilya Chandel 1/19 (4 overs)

Hong Kong won by 8 wickets
Kaizuka Cricket Ground, Kaizuka
Umpires: Adam Birss (Jpn) and Dhakshinamoorthy Natarajan (Jpn)
Player of the match: Mariko Hill (HK)

- Japan won the toss and elected to bat.
- Minami Yoshioka (Jpn) made her WT20I debut.

=== 3rd WT20I ===
29 October 2022
11:00
Scorecard

Hong Kong; 142/2 (20 overs)	v	Japan; 139/4 (20 overs)
Natasha Miles 86* (70); Mai Yanagida 1/15 (2 overs)		Akari Kano 54 (50); Ruchitha Venkatesh 1/25 (4 overs)

Hong Kong won by 3 runs
Kaizuka Cricket Ground, Kaizuka
Umpires: Adam Birss (Jpn) and Dhakshinamoorthy Natarajan (Jpn)
Player of the match: Natasha Miles (HK)

- Hong Kong won the toss and elected to bat.
- Ayumi Fujikawa, Meg Ogawa (Jpn) and Georgina Bradley (HK) all made their WT20I debuts.

=== 4th WT20I ===
30 October 2022
11:00
Scorecard

Hong Kong; 101/7 (20 overs)	v	Japan; 101/7 (20 overs)
Ruchitha Venkatesh 23* (26); Ahilya Chandel 1/10 (3 overs)		Ahilya Chandel 26 (28); Maryam Bibi 2/13 (4 overs)

Match tied (Hong Kong won the Super Over)
Kaizuka Cricket Ground, Kaizuka
Umpires: Adam Birss (Jpn) and Dhakshinamoorthy Natarajan (Jpn)
Player of the match: Ruchitha Venkatesh (HK)

- Japan won the toss and elected to field.
- Super Over: Japan 4/2, Hong Kong 5/0.
- Shizuka Miyaji took her 45th international wicket to became Japan's all-time leading wicket taker.
