= 2016 Lancashire Thunder season =

English women's Twenty20 cricket team season

Lancashire Thunder
2016 season
- Coach: Stephen Titchard
- Captain: Amy Satterthwaite
- Overseas player: Deandra Dottin; Hayley Matthews; Amy Satterthwaite
- WCSL: Group stage, 6th
- Most runs: Amy Satterthwaite (146)
- Most wickets: Hayley Matthews (8)
- Most catches: Natalie Brown (2); Deandra Dottin (2); Sophie Ecclestone (2); Amy Satterthwaite (2)
- Most wicket-keeping dismissals: Eleanor Threlkeld (5)

The 2016 season was Lancashire Thunder's first season, in which they competed in the Women's Cricket Super League, a Twenty20 competition. The side finished bottom of the group stage, winning one of their five matches.

The side was partnered with Lancashire County Cricket Club, and played their home matches at Old Trafford and Stanley Park. They were coached by Stephen Titchard and captained by overseas player Amy Satterthwaite.

== Squad ==
Lancashire Thunder's 14-player squad is listed below. The squad originally contained 15 players, but Sarah Taylor, who was also meant to captain the side, withdrew due to anxiety issues. Jess Jonassen and Sarah Coyte were initially signed as overseas players, but were replaced by Hayley Matthews and Amy Satterthwaite, respectively, with Satterthwaite also replacing Taylor as captain. Age given is at the start of Lancashire Thunder's first match of the season (31 July 2016).

Name	Nationality	Birth date	Batting Style	Bowling Style	Notes
Batters
Laura Marshall	England	1 November 1993 (aged 22)	Right-handed	Right-arm medium	
Natasha Miles	Hong Kong	19 October 1988 (aged 27)	Right-handed	Right-arm medium	
All-rounders
Natalie Brown	England	16 October 1990 (aged 25)	Right-handed	Right arm medium	
Deandra Dottin	West Indies	21 June 1991 (aged 25)	Right-handed	Right-arm medium	Overseas player
Emma Lamb	England	16 December 1997 (aged 18)	Right-handed	Right-arm off break	
Hayley Matthews	West Indies	19 March 1998 (aged 18)	Right-handed	Right-arm off break	Overseas player
Laura Newton	England	27 November 1977 (aged 38)	Right-handed	Right-arm medium	
Amy Satterthwaite	New Zealand	7 October 1986 (aged 29)	Left-handed	Right-arm medium	Captain; Overseas player
Danni Wyatt	England	22 April 1991 (aged 25)	Right-handed	Right-arm off break	
Wicket-keepers
Eleanor Threlkeld	England	16 November 1998 (aged 17)	Right-handed	—	
Bowlers
Kate Cross	England	3 October 1991 (aged 24)	Right-handed	Right-arm medium	
Sophie Ecclestone	England	6 May 1999 (aged 17)	Right-handed	Slow left-arm orthodox	
Georgia Holmes	England	22 November 1996 (aged 19)	Right-handed	Right-arm medium	
Nalisha Patel	England	18 March 1998 (aged 18)	Right-handed	Right-arm off break	

== Women's Cricket Super League ==
=== Season standings ===
Points table
Pos	Team	Pld	W	L	T	NR	BP	Pts	NRR
1	Southern Vipers	5	4	1	0	0	3	11	1.437
2	Western Storm	5	4	1	0	0	1	9	0.838
3	Loughborough Lightning	5	3	2	0	0	2	8	0.170
4	Surrey Stars	5	2	3	0	0	1	5	−0.274
5	Yorkshire Diamonds	5	1	4	0	0	1	3	−0.362
6	Lancashire Thunder	5	1	4	0	0	0	2	−1.724

Source: ESPN Cricinfo

Advanced to the Final.
Advanced to the Semi-final.

=== League stage ===
31 July
14:30
Scorecard

Lancashire Thunder; 83 (18.3 overs)	v	Western Storm; 86/6 (15.3 overs)
Emma Lamb 25 (27); Heather Knight 3/11 (4 overs)		Heather Knight 23 (25); Deandra Dottin 3/8 (3 overs)

Western Storm won by 4 wickets
County Ground, Taunton
Umpires: Russell Warren and Chris Watts

- Lancashire Thunder won the toss and elected to bat.
- Points: Western Storm 3, Lancashire Thunder 0

3 August
16:30 (D/N)
Scorecard

Lancashire Thunder; 164/8 (20 overs)	v	Loughborough Lightning; 158 (19.5 overs)
Amy Satterthwaite 52 (32); Georgia Elwiss 2/37 (4 overs)		Paige Scholfield 38 (22); Sophie Ecclestone 3/23 (4 overs)

Lancashire Thunder won by 6 runs
Haslegrave Ground, Loughborough
Umpires: Ian Blackwell and Russell Warren

- Loughborough Lightning won the toss and elected to bowl.
- Points: Lancashire Thunder 2, Loughborough Lightning 0

5 August
14:30
Scorecard

Southern Vipers; 132/4 (20 overs)	v	Lancashire Thunder; 121/7 (20 overs)
Sara McGlashan 54 (50); Hayley Matthews 2/16 (4 overs)		Emma Lamb 34 (35); Morna Nielsen 2/16 (4 overs)

Southern Vipers won by 11 runs
Stanley Park, Blackpool
Umpires: Tom Lungley and Paul Pollard

- Southern Vipers won the toss and elected to bat.
- Points: Southern Vipers 2, Lancashire Thunder 0

9 August
14:30
Scorecard

Lancashire Thunder; 102/9 (20 overs)	v	Surrey Stars; 106/3 (15.2 overs)
Amy Satterthwaite 34* (43); Alex Hartley 3/11 (4 overs)		Tammy Beaumont 45* (36); Deandra Dottin 1/13 (2 overs)

Surrey Stars won by 7 wickets
Woodbridge Road, Guildford
Umpires: Tom Lungley and Russell Warren

- Surrey Stars won the toss and elected to field.
- Points: Surrey Stars 3, Lancashire Thunder 0

12 August
18:00 (D/N)
Scorecard

Yorkshire Diamonds; 166/6 (20 overs)	v	Lancashire Thunder; 71 (15 overs)
Alex Blackwell 59 (42); Hayley Matthews 1/21 (4 overs)		Deandra Dottin 25 (24); Danielle Hazell 4/10 (4 overs)

Yorkshire Diamonds won by 95 runs
Old Trafford, Manchester
Umpires: Ben Debenham and Chris Watts

- Yorkshire Diamonds won the toss and elected to bat.
- Points: Yorkshire Diamonds 3, Lancashire Thunder 0

== Statistics ==
=== Batting ===
Player	Matches	Innings	NO	Runs	HS	Average	Strike rate	100s	50s	4s	6s
Natalie Brown	5	4	1	15	9	5.00	71.42	0	0	0	0
Kate Cross	5	5	0	18	9	3.60	90.00	0	0	3	0
Deandra Dottin	5	5	0	87	42	17.40	104.81	0	0	13	1
Sophie Ecclestone	5	2	2	4	4*	–	80.00	0	0	0	0
Emma Lamb	5	5	0	122	34	24.40	104.27	0	0	13	0
Laura Marshall	3	3	1	9	7	4.50	90.00	0	0	1	0
Hayley Matthews	5	5	0	21	11	4.20	53.84	0	0	3	0
Natasha Miles	3	3	0	4	2	1.33	28.57	0	0	0	0
Laura Newton	3	3	0	32	17	10.66	76.19	0	0	4	0
Nalisha Patel	1	1	0	0	0	0.00	0.00	0	0	0	0
Amy Satterthwaite	5	5	1	146	52	36.50	102.81	0	1	21	1
Eleanor Threlkeld	5	3	0	14	7	4.66	53.84	0	0	1	0
Danni Wyatt	5	5	0	39	29	7.80	88.63	0	0	4	0
Source: ESPN Cricinfo

=== Bowling ===
Player	Matches	Innings	Overs	Maidens	Runs	Wickets	BBI	Average	Economy	Strike rate
Natalie Brown	5	2	2.0	0	24	0	–	–	12.00	–
Kate Cross	5	5	14.3	1	109	3	1/15	36.33	7.51	29.0
Deandra Dottin	5	5	17.0	0	114	7	3/8	16.28	6.70	14.5
Sophie Ecclestone	5	5	20.0	0	124	6	3/23	20.66	6.20	20.0
Hayley Matthews	5	5	17.5	1	97	8	3/25	12.12	5.43	13.3
Amy Satterthwaite	5	5	14.2	0	109	2	1/22	54.50	7.60	43.0
Danni Wyatt	5	3	5.0	0	45	0	–	–	9.00	–
Source: ESPN Cricinfo

=== Fielding ===
Player	Matches	Innings	Catches
Natalie Brown	5	5	2
Kate Cross	5	5	0
Deandra Dottin	5	5	2
Sophie Ecclestone	5	5	2
Emma Lamb	5	5	1
Laura Marshall	3	3	1
Hayley Matthews	5	5	0
Natasha Miles	3	3	1
Laura Newton	3	3	0
Nalisha Patel	1	1	0
Amy Satterthwaite	5	5	2
Danni Wyatt	5	5	1
Source: ESPN Cricinfo

=== Wicket-keeping ===
Player	Matches	Innings	Catches	Stumpings
Eleanor Threlkeld	5	5	3	2
Source: ESPN Cricinfo
