= List of Hong Kong women Twenty20 International cricketers =

This is a list of Hong Kong women Twenty20 International cricketers. A Twenty20 International is an international cricket match between two representative teams. A Twenty20 International is played under the rules of Twenty20 cricket[key feature being;each team bats for a maximum of 20 overs (120 legal balls)] . In April 2018, the International Cricket Council (ICC) granted full international status to Twenty20 women's matches played between member sides from 1 July 2018 onwards.

The list is arranged in the order in which each player won her first Twenty20 cap. Where more than one player won her first Twenty20 cap in the same match, those players are listed alphabetically by surname.

== Key ==
General

- ‡ – Captain
- † – Wicket-keeper
- First – Year of debut
- Last – Year of latest game
- Mat – Number of matches played

Batting

- Runs – Runs scored in career
- HS – Highest score
- Avg – Runs scored per dismissal
- * – Batsman remained not out
- 50 – Number of half centuries
- 100 – Centuries scored

Bowling

- Balls – Balls bowled in career
- Wkt – Wickets taken in career
- BBI – Best bowling in an innings
- Ave – Average runs per wicket

Fielding

- Ca – Catches taken
- St – Stumpings affected

== Players ==
Statistics are correct as of 7 September 2026.

Hong Kong women T20I cricketers
General					Batting					Bowling					Filding		Ref
No.	Name	First	Last	Mat	Runs	HS	Avg	50	100	Balls	Wkt	BBI	Ave	5WI	Ca	St	Ref
1	Bella Poon	2019	2023	19	113	14	6.27	0	0	–	–	–	–	–	1	0	
2	Kary Chan‡	2019	2026	117	1,765	87	18.77	4	0	2,411	155	5/4	11.78	4	41	0	
3	Betty Chan	2019	2025	84	100	20*	5.55	0	0	1,657	92	4/13	12.40	0	10	0	
4	Yasmin Daswani‡†	2019	2026	97	1,525	86*	25.41	5	0	–	–	–	–	–	34	9	
5	Mariko Hill‡	2019	2026	106	2,223	106	24.16	8	2	1,032	47	5/2	18.57	1	38	0	
6	Hiu Ying Cheung†	2019	2026	71	139	11*	4.79	0	0	–	–	–	–	–	26	18	
7	Ruchitha Venkatesh	2019	2026	76	189	25	7.87	0	0	1,134	38	3/8	25.52	0	8	0	
8	Shanzeen Shahzad†	2019	2026	104	869	54	11.58	2	0	–	–	–	–	–	20	1	
9	Jasmine Titmuss	2019	2019	9	26	13	4.33	0	0	144	10	3/5	10.00	0	3	0	
10	Alison Siu	2019	2026	101	125	12*	8.92	0	0	1,808	88	5/8	16.54	1	10	0	
11	Mehreen Yousaf	2019	2019	12	27	10	4.50	0	0	126	6	3/0	14.16	0	1	0	
12	Jaswinder Kaur	2019	2019	2	8	8	8.00	0	0	–	–	–	–	–	0	0	
13	Emma Lai	2019	2026	55	177	20*	5.53	0	0	317	17	4/19	17.35	0	6	0	
14	Annie Ho	2019	2019	4	0	0*	0.00	0	0	54	0	–	–	0	1	0	
15	Maryam Bibi‡	2019	2026	110	744	43	14.03	0	0	1,375	76	4/8	17.85	0	36	0	
16	Jenefer Davies†	2019	2019	6	10	5	2.50	0	0	–	–	–	–	0	0	5	
17	Marina Lamplough	2019	2026	46	349	33*	12.46	0	0	402	18	4/11	21.61	0	30	0	
18	Yee Shan To	2019	2026	24	207	37	10.89	0	0	156	7	3/9	18.71	0	7	0	
19	Iqra Sahar	2021	2026	83	63	10*	3.70	0	0	1,511	55	4/4	23.83	0	13	0	
20	Natasha Miles‡	2021	2026	94	2,057	100*	27.79	9	1	–	–	–	–	–	22	0	
21	Tammy Chu	2021	2023	6	0	0	0.00	0	0	42	2	1/7	25.50	0	1	0	
22	Heiley Lui	2021	2023	3	1	1	1.00	0	0	6	0	–	–	0	0	0	
23	Cindy Ho	2022	2023	6	6	4	2.00	0	0	60	3	3/10	22.00	0	1	0	
24	Elysa Hubbard	2022	2024	14	54	13*	10.80	0	0	144	1	1/22	141.00	0	5	0	
25	Georgina Bradley	2022	2022	1	–	–	–	–	–	–	–	–	–	–	0	0	
26	Shing Chan	2023	2026	30	99	17*	7.07	0	0	120	4	3/13	30.25	0	5	0	
27	Charlotte Chan	2023	2026	19	23	9	3.28	0	0	108	7	2/4	17.57	0	3	0	
28	Amanda Cheung	2023	2026	8	32	9	4.00	0	0	132	4	1/1	31.50	0	1	0	
29	Akasha Yousaf	2023	2023	1	–	–	–	–	–	12	1	1/4	4.00	0	0	0	
30	Joyleen Kaur	2024	2026	34	32	11*	4.57	0	0	487	33	4/19	13.09	0	4	0	
31	Kaur Mahekdeep	2024	2026	14	1	1	0.33	0	0	188	10	3/7	18.30	0	0	0	
32	Fatima Amir	2024	2025	8	5	4	2.50	0	0	84	6	2/1	9.66	0	2	0	
33	Karen Poon	2024	2025	6	1	1	1.00	0	0	30	0	–	–	0	0	0	
34	Alishba Kanwal	2025	2025	3	1	1*	–	0	0	24	2	1/7	11.00	0	0	0	
35	Zara Haider	2025	2025	1	–	–	–	–	–	12	1	1/15	15.00	0	0	0	
36	Maira Saleem	2025	2025	1	–	–	–	–	–	18	0	–	0	0	0	0	
37	Rania Sutton	2025	2025	1	–	–	–	–	–	6	0	–	–	0	0	0	
38	Storm Parker	2025	2026	7	3	3*	3.00	0	0	108	8	2/10	9.00	0	1	0	
39	Vanessa So	2025	2025	1	–	–	–	–	–	–	–	–	–	0	0	0	
40	Hailey Wong	2026	2026	2	1	1*	–	0	0	12	0	–	–	0	0	0	
