= 2024 Capricorn Women's Tri-Nation Series =

International cricket tournament

2024 Capricorn Women's Tri-Series
- Date: 6–14 September 2024
- Location: Namibia
- Result: United Arab Emirates won the tournament
- Player of the series: Esha Oza (UAE)
Teams
Namibia	United Arab Emirates	Zimbabwe
Captains
Sune Wittmann	Esha Oza	Chiedza Dhururu
Most runs
Sune Wittmann (159)	Theertha Satish (245)	Chipo Mugeri-Tiripano (146)
Most wickets
Jurriene Diergaardt (9)	Vaishnave Mahesh (8); Esha Oza (8)	Beloved Biza (9)

The 2024 Capricorn Women's Tri-Series was a Women's Twenty20 International (WT20I) cricket tournament that was held in Namibia in September 2024. The participating teams were the hosts Namibia, along with UAE and Zimbabwe. The tournament was contested in a triple round-robin format.

== Squads ==
Namibia	United Arab Emirates	Zimbabwe
Sune Wittmann (c); Yasmeen Khan (vc); Naomi Benjamin; Jurriene Diergaardt; Merczerly Gorases (wk); Kayleen Green; Victoria Hamunyela; Bianca Manuel; Mekelaye Mwatile; Wilka Mwatile; Sylvia Shihepo; Saima Tuhadeleni; Edelle van Zyl; Irene van Zyl	Esha Oza (c, wk); Samaira Dharnidharka; Heena Hotchandani; Lavanya Keny; Kavisha Egodage; Vaishnave Mahesh; Indhuja Nandakumar; Rinitha Rajith; Rishitha Rajith; Rithika Rajith; Keziah Sabin; Theertha Satish (wk); Archara Supriya; Mehak Thakur	Chiedza Dhururu (c, wk); Beloved Biza; Kudzai Chigora; Lindokuhle Mabhera; Tawananyasha Marumani; Chipo Moyo; Chipo Mugeri-Tiripano; Passionate Munorwei; Modester Mupachikwa (wk); Christine Mutasa; Kelis Ndhlovu; Josephine Nkomo; Runyararo Pasipanodya; Lorraine Pemhiwa; Loryn Phiri

== Round-robin ==
=== Points table ===
Pos	Team	Pld	W	L	NR	Pts	NRR
1	United Arab Emirates	6	5	1	0	10	0.890
2	Namibia	6	3	3	0	6	−0.337
3	Zimbabwe	6	1	5	0	2	−0.501

Source: ESPNcricinfo

=== Fixtures ===
6 September 2024
14:00
Scorecard

Namibia; 102/6 (20 overs)	v	United Arab Emirates; 103/3 (11.4 overs)
Sune Wittmann 24 (32); Indhuja Nandakumar 2/10 (4 overs)		Theertha Satish 45* (35); Mekelaye Mwatile 2/19 (3.4 overs)

United Arab Emitates won by 7 wickets
Wanderers Cricket Ground, Windhoek
Umpires: Susca Loftie-Eaton (Nam) and Sunette Schoonbee (Nam)
Player of the match: Theertha Satish (UAE)

- United Arab Emirates won the toss and elected to field.
- Keziah Sabin (UAE) made her T20I debut.

7 September 2024
14:00
Scorecard

United Arab Emirates; 93 (17 overs)	v	Zimbabwe; 94/7 (19.2 overs)
Esha Oza 34 (38); Kudzai Chigora 5/7 (4 overs)		Josephine Nkomo 30* (25); Heena Hotchandani 2/10 (4 overs)

Zimbabwe won by 3 wickets
Wanderers Cricket Ground, Windhoek
Umpires: Sunette Schoonbee (Nam) and Maryke Short (Nam)
Player of the match: Kudzai Chigora (Zim)

- Zimbabwe won the toss and elected to field.
- Tawananyasha Marumani (Zim) made her T20I debut.
- Kudzai Chigora (Zim) took her first five-wicket haul in T20Is.

8 September 2024
14:00
Scorecard

Zimbabwe; 101/8 (20 overs)	v	Namibia; 104/7 (19.1 overs)
Modester Mupachikwa 39 (55); Jurriene Diergaardt 2/5 (1 over)		Merczerly Gorases 27 (47); Beloved Biza 2/9 (1.1 overs)

Namibia won by 3 wickets
Wanderers Cricket Ground, Windhoek
Umpires: Eloise Du Plooy (Nam) and Susca Lofie-Eaton (Nam)
Player of the match: Sune Wittmann (Nam)

- Namibia won the toss and elected to field.

9 September 2024
14:00
Scorecard

United Arab Emirates; 141 (20 overs)	v	Namibia; 126/7 (20 overs)
Esha Oza 42 (40); Jurriene Diergaardt 4/15 (4 overs)		Wilka Mwatile 31 (38); Esha Oza 3/29 (4 overs)

United Arab Emirates won by 15 runs
Wanderers Cricket Ground, Windhoek
Umpires: Susca Lofie-Eaton (Nam) and Sunette Schoonbee (Nam)
Player of the match: Esha Oza (UAE)

- Namibia won the toss and elected to field.

10 September 2024
14:00
Scorecard

Zimbabwe; 145/5 (20 overs)	v	United Arab Emirates; 148/5 (20 overs)
Beloved Biza 48 (43); Kavisha Egodage 2/32 (4 overs)		Esha Oza 84 (65); Kelis Ndhlovu 1/15 (2 overs)

United Arab Emirates won by 5 wickets
Wanderers Cricket Ground, Windhoek
Umpires: Eloise Du Plooy (Nam) and Sunette Schoonbee (Nam)
Player of the match: Esha Oza (UAE)

- United Arab Emirates won the toss and elected to field.
- Passionate Munorwei (Zim) made her T20I debut.

11 September 2024
14:00
Scorecard

Zimbabwe; 133/7 (20 overs)	v	Namibia; 134/5 (19.3 overs)
Modester Mupachikwa 31 (23); Jurriene Diergaardt 2/20 (4 overs)		Sune Wittmann 56 (48); Beloved Biza 3/22 (3 overs)

Namibia won by 5 wickets
Wanderers Cricket Ground, Windhoek
Umpires: Sunette Schoonbee (Nam) and Maryke Short (Nam)
Player of the match: Mekelaye Mwatile (Nam)

- Namibia won the toss and elected to field.
- Chipo Moyo and Runyararo Pasipanodya (Zim) both made their T20I debuts.

12 September 2024
14:00
Scorecard

Namibia; 126/7 (20 overs)	v	United Arab Emirates; 129/6 (19.2 overs)
Sune Wittmann 43 (35); Esha Oza 2/19 (3 overs)		Theertha Satish 45 (37); Victoria Hamunyela 2/28 (4 overs)

United Arab Emirates won by 4 wickets
Wanderers Cricket Ground, Windhoek
Umpires: Eloise Du Plooy (Nam) and Maryke Short (Nam)
Player of the match: Esha Oza (UAE)

- United Arab Emirates won the toss and elected to field.

13 September 2024
14:00
Scorecard

Zimbabwe; 128/7 (20 overs)	v	United Arab Emirates; 130/1 (16.2 overs)
Beloved Biza 36 (31); Samaira Dharnidharka 2/25 (4 overs)		Theertha Satish 81* (54); Kelis Ndhlovu 1/30 (4 overs)

United Arab Emirates won by 9 wickets
Wanderers Cricket Ground, Windhoek
Umpires: Eloise Du Plooy (Nam) and Susca Lofie-Eaton (Nam)
Player of the match: Theertha Satish (UAE)

- United Arab Emirates won the toss and elected to field.
- Lorraine Pemhiwa (Zim) made her T20I debut.

14 September 2024
14:00
Scorecard

Namibia; 127/5 (20 overs)	v	Zimbabwe; 103 (19.5 overs)
Merczerly Gorases 45 (53); Kelis Ndhlovu 2/18 (4 overs)		Chipo Mugeri-Tiripano 27 (26); Mekelaye Mwatile 3/32 (4 overs)

Namibia won by 24 runs
Wanderers Cricket Ground, Windhoek
Umpires: Eloise Du Plooy (Nam) and Susca Lofie-Eaton (Nam)
Player of the match: Wilka Mwatile (Nam)

- Zimbabwe won the toss and elected to field.
