= Botsogo Mpedi =

Motswana cricketer

Personal information
- Born: 3 February 2003 (age 23)
- Batting: Right-handed
- Bowling: Right-arm-medium
- Role: Bowler

International information
- National side: Botswana
- T20I debut (cap 2): 20 August 2022 v Lesotho
- Last T20I: 8 September 2023 v Kenya

Career statistics
Competition	WT20I
Matches	24
Runs scored	107
Batting average	7.13
100s/50s	0/0
Top score	20
Balls bowled	317
Wickets	23
Bowling average	12.78
5 wickets in innings	1
10 wickets in match	0
Best bowling	6/8
Catches/stumpings	4/–
- Source: Cricinfo, 8 September 2023

Botsogo Mpedi (born 3 February 2003) is a Motswana cricketer who represents Botswana at international level. She is fondly nicknamed Mochudi Express.

== Early life ==
She pursued her interest in the sport of cricket in 2013 when she was in Standard Four at Rasesa Primary School. She was selected to the Kgatleng regional cricket team after impressing at a schools competition held in Mochudi. She was subsequently selected to the Botswana national U-13 cricket team in 2014 and was also later approached by the national U-19 set-up as the youngest member of the squad. She spent nearly a month in India to attend a cricket course. She idolised Indian opening batter Smriti Mandhana while growing up. She also studied at Molefi Senior Secondary School.

== Career ==
She made her WT20I debut on 20 August 2018 at the age of 15 against Lesotho during the 2018 Botswana Cricket Association Women's T20I Series and had a memorable international debut by claiming a six-wicket haul in her three-over spell. Her bowling effort helped Botswana to secure a thumping win over Lesotho by a massive 124 runs. She also became the first bowler to take a five-wicket haul as well as a six-wicket haul on WT20I debut. She held the record for the best ever bowling figures on Women's T20 International debut before being surpassed by Nepal's Anjali Chand who claimed 6/0 against Maldives at the 2019 South Asian Games. Mpedi also became the youngest woman cricketer to pick up five-wicket haul in a WT20I at the age of 15 as well as the youngest debutant to do so. She also picked up the second ever six-wicket haul in WT20I history after New Zealand's Amy Satterthwaite when she grabbed her career best figures of 6/8 in 2.3 overs spell at the Botswana Cricket Association Oval. She was awarded the player-of-the-match for her outstanding bowling display in the field which sparked a batting collapse of Lesotho who bowled out for a modest total of just 40 runs in a run chase of 165. Although Botswana failed to qualify for the final of the six nation tournament, Mpedi managed to impress with her bowling efforts as a consolation for the hosts by ending up as the leading wicket taker of the Botswana Cricket Association Women's T20I Series with 14 scalps.

In June 2021, she was included in Botswana's lineup for the 2021 Kwibuka Women's T20 Tournament. However, Botswana failed to win any of their matches in the five team competition which also included Namibia, Kenya, hosts Rwanda and Nigeria.

In September 2021, she was named in Botswana's squad for the 2021 ICC Women's T20 World Cup Africa Qualifier tournament in Botswana.

== See also ==
- List of five-wicket hauls in women's Twenty20 International cricket
