= List of Botswana women Twenty20 International cricketers =

This is a list of Botswana women Twenty20 International cricketers. A Twenty20 International is an international cricket match between two representative teams, each having Twenty20 International status, as determined by the International Cricket Council (ICC). A Twenty20 International is played under the rules of Twenty20 cricket. This list includes all players who have played at least one T20I match and is initially arranged in the order of debut appearance. Where more than one player won their first cap in the same match, those players are initially listed alphabetically by surname at the time of debut.

== Key ==
General

- ‡ – Captain
- † – Wicket-keeper
- First – Year of debut
- Last – Year of latest game
- Mat – Number of matches played

Batting

- Runs – Runs scored in career
- HS – Highest score
- Avg – Runs scored per dismissal
- * – Batsman remained not out
- 50 – Number of half centuries

Bowling

- Wkt – Wickets taken in career
- BBI – Best bowling in an innings
- Ave – Average runs per wicket

Fielding

- Ca – Catches taken
- St – Stumpings affected

== List of players ==
Last updated 11 April 2026.

Botswana women T20I cricketers
General					Batting				Bowling				Fielding		Ref
No.	Name	First	Last	Mat	Runs	HS	Avg	50	Balls	Wkt	BBI	Ave	Ca	St	Ref
1	Olebogeng Batisani	2018	2022	24	358	77	16.27	1	12	1	1/4	11.00	3	0	
2	Onneile Keitsemang	2018	2025	44	19	10*	1.35	0	340	18	4/21	21.27	7	0	
3	Thandiwe Legabile	2018	2022	24	88	42*	6.76	0	345	14	2/2	22.00	5	0	
4	Bontle Madimabe†	2018	2023	29	45	10	3.21	0	–	–	–	–	5	2	
5	Goabilwe Matome‡	2018	2026	74	711	45*	15.12	0	1,429	78	6/1	13.53	20	0	
6	Precious Modimo	2018	2019	4	0	0*	–	0	37	3	2/23	19.00	0	0	
7	Amantle Mokgotlhe	2018	2026	67	485	60*	12.43	2	903	32	3/2	24.84	18	0	
8	Laura Mophakedi‡†	2018	2026	82	1,289	67	16.52	5	18	0	–	–	31	9	
9	Shameelah Mosweu	2018	2024	47	589	86*	14.72	2	717	38	6/3	16.55	8	0	
10	Botsogo Mpedi	2018	2023	24	107	20	7.13	0	317	23	6/8	12.78	4	0	
11	Mimmie Ramafifi	2018	2022	20	41	6	2.00	0	275	13	2/3	20.69	3	0	
12	Florence Samanyika	2018	2023	48	569	41	13.87	0	565	26	4/16	19.92	9	0	
13	Banyana Gaanamong	2018	2019	12	29	19	5.80	0	72	7	4/30	13.28	4	0	
14	Vanessa Thari Thari	2018	2019	2	–	–	–	–	18	1	1/47	47.00	0	0	
15	Thapelo Modise	2019	2023	30	286	61*	12.43	1	–	–	–	–	10	0	
16	Tuelo Shadrack‡	2019	2026	75	478	62*	9.37	1	1,476	70	4/3	14.55	16	0	
17	Ellen Gare	2019	2019	1	–	–	–	–	–	–	–	–	2	0	
18	Botho Freeman	2019	2023	11	35	14	3.88	0	96	3	1/14	29.33	0	0	
19	Jacqueline Kgang	2021	2021	9	16	6	3.20	0	90	6	3/18	11.83	1	0	
20	Tebogo Motlhabaphuti	2021	2023	16	35	11*	3.88	0	30	1	1/13	38.00	6	0	
21	Collin Mokibelo	2021	2021	2	–	–	–	–	–	–	–	–	0	0	
22	Oratile Kgeresi	2022	2026	56	347	59*	7.88	1	90	6	4/3	13.00	10	0	
23	Amantle Letuba	2022	2024	5	2	2	0.66	0	–	–	–	–	2	0	
24	Pako Mapotsane	2023	2026	43	448	53	16.59	2	306	24	4/6	13.08	10	0	
25	Merapelo Phiase	2023	2026	40	47	10	3.61	0	131	11	3/6	9.90	6	0	
26	Wendy Moutswi	2023	2026	30	171	36	12.21	0	348	18	3/11	13.61	5	0	
27	Goitseone Setshwane	2023	2025	8	1	1	0.50	0	150	8	3/17	11.37	2	0	
28	Kesego Inakale	2024	2026	31	21	8	3.50	0	225	8	2/12	31.00	3	0	
29	Lesego Kooagile	2024	2025	6	1	1*	–	0	12	1	1/5	5.00	2	0	
30	Tebogo Moitoi	2024	2024	5	0	0	0.00	0	–	–	–	–	0	0	
31	Aliya Motorwala	2024	2025	8	2	2	0.66	0	–	–	–	–	1	0	
32	Mercy Dipogiso	2024	2026	3	–	–	–	–	–	–	–	–	0	0	
33	Tlhalefo Godisamang	2025	2026	12	1	1*	0.33	0	–	–	–	–	0	0	
34	Keotshepile Kearialo	2025	2025	1	–	–	–	–	–	–	–	–	1	0	
35	Mpho Modise	2026	2026	6	16	12*	8.00	0	12	0	–	–	1	0	
36	Maatla Sefati	2026	2026	2	1	1	0.50	0	12	1	1/6	15.00	0	0	
37	Entle Mmese	2026	2026	6	2	2	2.00	0	48	2	1/4	17.00	1	0	
38	Makanaka Mustafo	2026	2026	2	–	–	–	–	–	–	–	–	0	0	
39	Keletso Raphapha	2026	2026	4	0	0	0.00	0	–	–	–	–	0	0	
