= West Indies women's cricket team in Sri Lanka in 2012–13 =

	Sri Lanka	West Indies
- Dates: 22 February – 8 March 2013
Captains	Shashikala Siriwardene	Merissa Aguilleira

One Day International series
- Results: West Indies won the 3-match series 2–1
Most runs	Deepika Rasangika (89)	Shemaine Campbelle (143)
Most wickets	Chamani Seneviratna (7)	Stafanie Taylor (4); Shemaine Campbelle (4); Tremayne Smartt (4)
- Player of the series: Shemaine Campbelle (WI)

Twenty20 International series
- Results: West Indies won the 5-match series 4–1
Most runs	Eshani Lokusuriyage (95)	Stafanie Taylor (140)
Most wickets	Eshani Lokusuriyage (9)	Shanel Daley (10)
- Player of the series: Stafanie Taylor (WI)

The West Indies women's cricket team toured Sri Lanka in February and March 2013. They played against Sri Lanka in three One Day Internationals and five Twenty20 Internationals, winning the ODI series 2–1 and winning the T20I series 4–1. The tour followed both sides' participation in the 2012 ICC Women's World Twenty20.

== Squads ==
Sri Lanka	West Indies
Shashikala Siriwardene (c); Chamari Atapattu; Sandamali Dolawatte; Rangika Fernando; Nipuni Hansika; Eshani Lokusuriyage; Dilani Manodara (wk); Chamari Polgampola; Udeshika Prabodhani; Inoka Ranaweera; Deepika Rasangika; Chamani Seneviratna; Sripali Weerakkody; Prasadani Weerakkody (wk)	Merissa Aguilleira (c) (wk); Shemaine Campbelle; Shanel Daley; Deandra Dottin; Kycia Knight (wk); Kyshona Knight; Natasha McLean; Anisa Mohammed; Subrina Munroe; Juliana Nero; June Ogle; Shaquana Quintyne; Shakera Selman; Tremayne Smartt; Stafanie Taylor

== WODI Series ==
=== 1st ODI ===
22 February 2013
Scorecard

Sri Lanka; 164/9 (50 overs)	v	West Indies; 165/6 (38 overs)
Deepika Rasangika 28 (38); Shakera Selman 2/8 (10 overs)		Deandra Dottin 43 (39); Chamani Seneviratna 2/23 (10 overs)

West Indies Women won by 4 wickets
Rangiri Dambulla International Stadium, Dambulla
Umpires: Lyndon Hannibal (SL) and Ravindra Kottahachchi (SL)

- Sri Lanka Women won the toss and elected to bat.

=== 2nd ODI ===
24 February 2013
Scorecard

West Indies; 180/8 (50 overs)	v	Sri Lanka; 184/6 (45.3 overs)
Shemaine Campbelle 105 (138); Sripali Weerakkody 3/19 (6 overs)		Deepika Rasangika 55 (91); Stafanie Taylor 2/31 (10 overs)

Sri Lanka Women won by 4 wickets
Rangiri Dambulla International Stadium, Dambulla
Umpires: Ravindra Kottahachchi (SL) and Sena Nandiweera (SL)

- West Indies Women won the toss and elected to bat.
- Nipuni Hansika (SL) made her WODI debut.

=== 3rd ODI ===
26 February 2013
Scorecard

West Indies; 191/9 (50 overs)	v	Sri Lanka; 158/9 (50 overs)
Merissa Aguilleira 29 (63); Chamani Seneviratna 4/33 (10 overs)		Shashikala Siriwardene 29 (78); Tremayne Smartt 2/26 (10 overs)

West Indies Women won by 33 runs
Rangiri Dambulla International Stadium, Dambulla
Umpires: Lyndon Hannibal (SL) and Sena Nandiweera (SL)

- Sri Lanka Women won the toss and elected to field.

== WT20I Series ==
=== 1st T20I ===
1 March 2013
Scorecard

Sri Lanka; 87/7 (20 overs)	v	West Indies; 90/8 (20 overs)
Eshani Lokusuriyage 25 (22); Shakera Selman 2/14 (4 overs)		Merissa Aguilleira 34* (39); Eshani Lokusuriyage 3/18 (4 overs)

West Indies Women won by 2 wickets
R. Premadasa Stadium, Colombo
Umpires: Deepal Gunawardene (SL) and Nishan Dhanasinghe (SL)

- Sri Lanka Women won the toss and elected to bat.
- Oshadi Ranasinghe (SL) made her WT20I debut.

=== 2nd T20I ===
3 March 2013
Scorecard

Sri Lanka; 73/8 (20 overs)	v	West Indies; 74/4 (15.4 overs)
Chamani Seneviratna 12* (12); Subrina Munroe 2/10 (4 overs)		Kyshona Knight 24* (31); Eshani Lokusuriyage 2/13 (3 overs)

West Indies Women won by 6 wickets
R. Premadasa Stadium, Colombo
Umpires: Deepal Gunawardene (SL) and Rohitha Kottahachchi (SL)

- Sri Lanka Women won the toss and elected to bat.
- Ama Kanchana (SL) made her WT20I debut.

=== 3rd T20I ===
5 March 2013
Scorecard

West Indies; 145/6 (20 overs)	v	Sri Lanka; 111 (19.2 overs)
Stafanie Taylor 75 (46); Shashikala Siriwardene 2/18 (4 overs)		Shashikala Siriwardene 46 (38); Shanel Daley 5/15 (4 overs)

West Indies Women won by 34 runs
R. Premadasa Stadium, Colombo
Umpires: Nishan Dhanasinghe (SL) and Rohitha Kottahachchi (SL)

- Sri Lanka Women won the toss and elected to field.

=== 4th T20I ===
7 March 2013
Scorecard

West Indies; 101 (19.4 overs)	v	Sri Lanka; 102/6 (19.3 overs)
Stafanie Taylor 40 (33); Shashikala Siriwardene 3/19 (4 overs)		Deepika Rasangika 19* (24); Stafanie Taylor 2/22 (4 overs)

Sri Lanka Women won by 4 wickets
R. Premadasa Stadium, Colombo
Umpires: Lyndon Hannibal (SL) and Rohitha Kottahachchi (SL)

- West Indies Women won the toss and elected to bat.
- Nilakshi de Silva, Nipuni Hansika (SL) and June Ogle (WI) made their WT20I debuts.

=== 5th T20I ===
8 March 2013
Scorecard

West Indies; 122/5 (20 overs)	v	Sri Lanka; 115 (20 overs)
Deandra Dottin 43 (33); Udeshika Prabodhani 2/8 (4 overs)		Eshani Lokusuriyage 44 (26); Shanel Daley 4/33 (4 overs)

West Indies Women won by 7 runs
R. Premadasa Stadium, Colombo
Umpires: Lyndon Hannibal (SL) and Nishan Dhanasinghe (SL)

- West Indies Women won the toss and elected to bat.

== See also ==
- 2012 ICC Women's World Twenty20
