= Zhejiang University of Technology Cricket Field =

Cricket field in Hangzhou

Zhejiang University of Technology Cricket Field (Pingfeng Campus)
- Hangzhou Cricket Ground
- Interactive map of Zhejiang University of Technology Cricket Field (Pingfeng Campus)

Ground information
- Location: 288 Liuhe Road, Xiju, Hangzhou, Zhejiang, China
- Country: China
- Coordinates: 30.2285°N 120.0314°E
- Establishment: 2021; 5 years ago
- Capacity: 1347
- Owner: Chinese Cricket Association
- Tenants: China
- End names
- Library End; Stadium End

International information
- First men's T20I: 27 September 2023: Mongolia v Nepal
- Last men's T20I: 7 October 2023: Afghanistan v India
- First women's T20I: 25 May 2023: China v Hong Kong
- Last women's T20I: 8 November 2024: Hong Kong v Mongolia

Team information
China	(2021–present)
Asian Games	(2023)
- As of 8 November 2024; Source: ESPNcricinfo

The Zhejiang University of Technology (Pingfeng Campus) Cricket Field (Chinese: 浙江工业大学（屏峰校区）板球场), also known as the Pingfeng Campus Cricket Ground (Chinese: 屏峰校区板球场) or ZJUT Cricket Field, is a cricket field located on the Pingfeng Campus of Zhejiang University of Technology in Hangzhou, Zhejiang Province, China.

== Overview ==
It is the largest cricket field in China in terms of construction area, and the only cricket field in Zhejiang Province that meets international competition standards. The cricket field was built in 2020 in preparation for the 2022 Asian Games, which were held in Hangzhou. It has a capacity of 1,347 spectators, and features a 26.5m x 12.5m rectangular pitch in the center of the field. The field is also equipped with a rainwater recycling and treatment system, which collects rainwater to water the plants after filtering. The two ends at the ground are called the Library End, and Pavilion End.

The Zhejiang University of Technology Cricket Field has hosted a number of international cricket matches, including the 2023 Women's Twenty20 East Asia Cup. It is also a popular venue for domestic cricket matches, and is used by the Zhejiang Provincial Cricket Team and the Zhejiang University of Technology Cricket Team. The cricket field is located on the northern edge of the Pingfeng Campus, adjacent to the Zhejiang University of Technology Gymnasium. In 2026, the stadium hosted the China Women T20I Tri Series 2026.
