= Nalisha Patel =

English cricketer

Personal information
- Full name: Nalisha Kumari A Patel
- Born: 18 March 1998 (age 28); Bolton, Greater Manchester, England
- Batting: Right-handed
- Bowling: Right-arm off break
- Role: Bowler

Domestic team information
- Years: Team
- 2012–2018: Lancashire
- 2016: Lancashire Thunder
- 2019: Cheshire

Career statistics
Competition	WLA	WT20
Matches	36	44
Runs scored	176	95
Batting average	10.35	8.63
100s/50s	0/0	0/0
Top score	38	25*
Balls bowled	1,022	618
Wickets	39	24
Bowling average	15.76	22.83
5 wickets in innings	1	0
10 wickets in match	0	0
Best bowling	5/6	3/6
Catches/stumpings	8/–	6/–
- Source: CricketArchive, 28 March 2021

Nalisha Kumari A Patel (born 18 March 1998) is an English cricketer who last played for Cheshire in 2019. She plays as a right-arm off break bowler. She has also played for Lancashire, as well as Lancashire Thunder in the Women's Cricket Super League.

== Early life ==
Patel was born on 18 March 1998 in Bolton, Greater Manchester.

== Domestic career ==
Patel made her county debut in 2012, for Lancashire against Worcestershire, in which she took 5/6 from 6.2 overs. In 2014, she was her side's leading wicket-taker in the County Championship, with 13 wickets at an average of 12.15. In 2016, she helped her side to promotion to Division 1 of the County Championship, and took 8 wickets at an average of 7.12. A season later, she was part of the Lancashire side that won the County Championship and Twenty20 Cup double.

In 2019, Patel appeared in four matches in the Twenty20 Cup for Cheshire, taking 2 wickets at an average of 38.50.

Patel also played one match for Lancashire Thunder in the 2016 Women's Cricket Super League, against Yorkshire Diamonds, in which she did not bowl and was dismissed first ball.

She also played in the 2013 Super Fours, for Sapphires.
