= Australia women's cricket team in India in 2011–12 =

Australian women's cricket team in India in 2011–12
	India	Australia
- Dates: 10 – 23 March 2012
Captains	Anjum Chopra	Jodie Fields

One Day International series
- Results: Australia won the 3-match series 3–0
Most runs	Harmanpreet Kaur (126)	Meg Lanning (184)
Most wickets	Rumeli Dhar (6)	Ellyse Perry (9)

Twenty20 International series
- Results: India won the 5-match series 4–1
Most runs	Harmanpreet Kaur (111)	Alyssa Healy (149)
Most wickets	Jhulan Goswami (6)	Julie Hunter (6)

The Australia women's national cricket team toured India in March 2012. They played against India in three One Day Internationals and five Twenty20 Internationals, winning the ODI series 3–0 and the T20I series 4–1.

== Squads ==
India	Australia
Anjum Chopra (c); Nooshin Al Khadeer; Sunitha Anand; Ekta Bisht; Archana Das; Rumeli Dhar; Jhulan Goswami; Mamatha Kanojia; Harmanpreet Kaur; Veda Krishnamurthy; Reema Malhotra; Sulakshana Naik (wk); Punam Raut; Mithali Raj; Amita Sharma; Shubhlakshmi Sharma; Gouher Sultana	Jodie Fields (c) (wk); Alex Blackwell; Sarah Coyte; Jess Duffin; Rachael Haynes; Alyssa Healy; Julie Hunter; Jess Jonassen; Meg Lanning; Sharon Millanta; Erin Osborne; Ellyse Perry; Leah Poulton; Lisa Sthalekar

== Tour Match ==
=== 50-over match: Board President's XI v Australia ===
10 March 2012
Scorecard

Board President's XI (India); 166/9 (50 overs)	v	Australia; 167/5 (24.2 overs)
Niranjana Nagarajan 50 (85); Rachael Haynes 2/4 (4 overs)		Rachael Haynes 76 (59); Sorhana Asha 1/26 (3 overs)

Australia Women won by 5 wickets
Sardar Patel Stadium, Ahmedabad
Umpires: Adil Palia (Ind) and Amiesh Saheba (Ind)

- Indian President's Women XI won the toss and elected to bat.

== WODI Series ==
=== 1st ODI ===
12 March 2012
Scorecard

Australia; 227/8 (50 overs)	v	India; 197/8 (50 overs)
Jodie Fields 64* (64); Rumeli Dhar 4/53 (10 overs)		Harmanpreet Kaur 57 (64); Lisa Sthalekar 2/25 (10 overs)

Australia Women won by 30 runs
Sardar Patel Stadium, Ahmedabad
Umpires: Amiesh Saheba (Ind) and Sanjay Hazare (Ind)

- Australia Women won the toss and elected to bat.

=== 2nd ODI ===
14 March 2012
Scorecard

Australia; 300/7 (50 overs)	v	India; 79 (27.1 overs)
Meg Lanning 128 (104); Rumeli Dhar 2/55 (10 overs)		Mithali Raj 30* (56); Ellyse Perry 5/19 (8.1 overs)

Australia Women won by 221 runs
Wankhede Stadium, Mumbai
Umpires: Kamlesh Sharma (Ind) and Pashchim Pathak (Ind)

- India Women won the toss and elected to field.

=== 3rd ODI ===
16 March 2012
Scorecard

India; 175/9 (50 overs)	v	Australia; 178/5 (35.4 overs)
Harmanpreet Kaur 63 (74); Jess Jonassen 2/14 (6 overs)		Jess Duffin 90* (87); Shubhlakshmi Sharma 2/41 (8 overs)

Australia Women won by 5 wickets
Wankhede Stadium, Mumbai
Umpires: Kamlesh Sharma (Ind) and Pashchim Pathak (Ind)

- India Women won the toss and elected to bat.
- Shubhlakshmi Sharma (Ind) made her WODI debut.

== WT20I Series ==
=== 1st T20I ===
18 March 2012
Scorecard

Australia; 138/4 (20 overs)	v	India; 109/8 (20 overs)
Jess Duffin 67 (50); Jhulan Goswami 1/20 (4 overs)		Harmanpreet Kaur 57 (48); Lisa Sthalekar 3/17 (4 overs)

Australia Women won by 29 runs
Dr. Y. S. Rajasekhara Reddy ACA–VDCA Cricket Stadium, Visakhapatnam
Umpires: K. N. Ananthapadmanabhan (Ind) and Ravi Subramanian (Ind)

- Australia Women won the toss and elected to bat.

=== 2nd T20I ===
19 March 2012
Scorecard

India; 111/3 (20 overs)	v	Australia; 115/2 (17.2 overs)
Anjum Chopra 33 (51); Sarah Coyte 1/20 (3 overs)		Jess Duffin 68* (54); Shubhlakshmi Sharma 1/19 (4 overs)

Australia Women won by 8 wickets
Dr. Y. S. Rajasekhara Reddy ACA–VDCA Cricket Stadium, Visakhapatnam
Umpires: K. N. Ananthapadmanabhan (Ind) and Ravi Subramanian (Ind)

- India Women won the toss and elected to bat.

=== 3rd T20I ===
21 March 2012
Scorecard

Australia; 151/2 (20 overs)	v	India; 88/6 (20 overs)
Alyssa Healy 90 (61); Archana Das 1/13 (4 overs)		Sulakshana Naik 34 (36); Sarah Coyte 3/19 (4 overs)

Australia Women won by 63 runs
Dr. Y. S. Rajasekhara Reddy ACA–VDCA Cricket Stadium, Visakhapatnam
Umpires: K. N. Ananthapadmanabhan (Ind) and Ravi Subramanian (Ind)

- Australia Women won the toss and elected to bat.

=== 4th T20I ===
22 March 2012
Scorecard

India; 85 (19 overs)	v	Australia; 86/0 (12.2 overs)
Harmanpreet Kaur 32 (41); Julie Hunter 4/15 (4 overs)		Alyssa Healy 54* (44)

Australia Women won by 10 wickets
Dr. Y. S. Rajasekhara Reddy ACA–VDCA Cricket Stadium, Visakhapatnam
Umpires: Belur Ravi (Ind) and Puttarangaiah Jayapal (Ind)

- India Women won the toss and elected to bat.

=== 5th T20I ===
23 March 2012
Scorecard

Australia; 89 (18.5 overs)	v	India; 92/2 (14.3 overs)
Leah Poulton 30 (28); Jhulan Goswami 5/11 (3.5 overs)		Amita Sharma 55* (47); Lisa Sthalekar 2/14 (4 overs)

India Women won by 8 wickets
Dr. Y. S. Rajasekhara Reddy ACA–VDCA Cricket Stadium, Visakhapatnam
Umpires: Belur Ravi (Ind) and Puttarangaiah Jayapal (Ind)

- Australia Women won the toss and elected to bat.
