= Eshani Kaushalya =

Sri Lankan cricketer

Personal information
- Full name: Lokusuriyage Eshani Kaushalya
- Born: 1 June 1984 (age 42); Panadura, Sri Lanka
- Batting: Right-handed
- Bowling: Right-arm medium

International information
- National side: Sri Lanka
- ODI debut (cap 31): 22 March 2005 v India
- Last ODI: 15 July 2017 v Pakistan
- ODI shirt no.: 3
- T20I debut (cap 6): 12 June 2009 v Pakistan
- Last T20I: 16 November 2018 v West Indies

Career statistics
Competition	ODI	T20I
Matches	89	68
Runs scored	1219	780
Batting average	15.62	14.18
100s/50s	0/5	0/1
Top score	65*	50
Balls bowled	2095	734
Wickets	49	36
Bowling average	30.42	19.77
5 wickets in innings	0	0
10 wickets in match	0	0
Best bowling	3/23	4/18
Catches/stumpings	13/–	16/–
Medal record
Representing Sri Lanka
Women's Cricket
Asian Games
Bronze medal – third place	2014 Incheon	Team
- Source: ESPNcricinfo, 19 September 2021

Eshani Kaushalya (also known as Eshani Lokusuriyage, born 1 June 1984) is a Sri Lankan former cricketer who played for the Sri Lanka national women's cricket team. An all-rounder, she played as a right-handed batsman and a right-arm medium pace bowler.

Kaushalya made her One Day International debut against India during the 2005 Women's Cricket World Cup, scoring seven runs. She collected her first international wicket later in the tournament, trapping West Indian Juliana Nero leg before wicket. She batted well for Sri Lanka during the 2006 Women's Asia Cup, finishing top of the batting averages for her country, scoring 106 runs at 35.33, including her career high score of 57. During the 2013 Women's Cricket World Cup, she scored two half-centuries, against England and India, and was named as part of the team of the tournament by the International Cricket Council.

In February 2016, she along with Ama Kanchana recorded the highest 8th wicket partnership in WT20I history (39).

In October 2018, she was named in Sri Lanka's squad for the 2018 ICC Women's World Twenty20 tournament in the West Indies.

In October 2021, she announced her retirement from cricket.
