= Hong Kong Cricket Club =

Cricket club in Hong Kong, founded in 1851

The Hong Kong Cricket Club
- 香港木球會
- Abbreviation: HKCC
- Formation: 7 June 1851; 175 years ago
- Type: Private Recreation Club
- Headquarters: 137 Wong Nai Chung Gap Road, Hong Kong
- Coordinates: 22°15′31″N 114°11′36″E
- Members: 2,400 members
- Patron: Mike Gatting
- President: Christopher C Pratt CBE
- Chairman: George D Lamplough
- Website: www.hkcc.org

The Hong Kong Cricket Club (HKCC) (Chinese: 香港木球會) is the oldest cricket club in East Asia. Founded in June 1851 to promote the game of cricket, tennis, croquet and other athletic sports and pastimes, the Club was originally situated at Chater Garden in Central, before moving in 1975 to its new home at Wong Nai Chung Gap.

Partnering with Hong Kong's historic sports authorities, and latterly with the city's National Sporting Associations (NSA), the Club has provided facilities for cricket and other sports to the people of Hong Kong for over 175 years. HKCC has reciprocal arrangements with 49 cricket and sports clubs in 16 countries, including with Lord's, the Home of Cricket.

== Introduction ==
=== Facilities ===
Located high in the valley between Mount Nicholson to the west and the ridge of Jardine's Lookout to the east, overlooking its former ground in Central, is the picturesque cricket ground. The Club has extensive facilities, including outdoor cricket nets (turf and astro) and a state-of-the-art three-lane indoor Cricket Centre of Excellence. Every season, over 600 men, women, boys, and girls represent the Club in Hong Kong and around the world on the many international tours the Club organises.

=== Senior Cricket ===
Cricket in Hong Kong is played from September until May.

Men's Cricket is represented in the domestic leagues by nine teams covering Friday Masters, Saturday Championship, and Sunday Elite and Premier cricket. The Premier League XI competes in all formats of the game against Hong Kong's strongest domestic competitors.

The Club's Sunday Elite teams (which play one-day cricket and T20 formats) are called Wanderers, Scorpions or Optimists. The Saturday Championship (playing 35-over cricket on Saturday afternoons) are the Gap-Ramblers, Nomads and Witherers, The Friday Masters and Sunday Challenge League teams "Qilin" and "Xuanwu" are coached and umpired in the Cantonese language.

Women's Cricket is prominent in promoting women's cricket throughout Hong Kong and China. The Club field three women's teams, Willows, Cavaliers and Diamonds, which compete in both 35-over, T20 and T10 formats throughout the season. Major women's cricket competitions held at the Club have recently included the 2023 Hong Kong Women's Quadrangular Series, won by Hong Kong and featuring women's teams from Hong Kong, Japan, Tanzania and Nepal.

=== Junior Cricket ===
HKCC is represented in all grades of cricket, from senior Premier and Elite XIs to numerous junior teams from ages U11 upwards. The HKCC cricket pathway begins with Gappers and Ramblers programmes. Established in the 1950s, every Saturday morning throughout the season, the Club welcomes over 400 children aged between 4 and 14 years old from all socioeconomic and ethnic groups to play Gappers cricket.

The Club's U11 girls' and boys' teams are the Sharks, Cobras, Hawks, Pumas, Warriors, Dragons, Rebels, Strikers, Eagles, and Black Rain.

The U13s' boys play as Scorpions, Optimists or Witherers, and the U13s' girls development team is also called Scorpions.

From the age of 15, the Club's juniors advance to the Ramblers programme to play T20 and 30-over and 35-over cricket, while the Under 17 Nomads and Gap Ramblers squads play T20 and 35-over matches in the Hong Kong, China domestic leagues.

In addition to training and playing in local league matches, the Club's junior cricketers participate in international tours which have included Singapore and India.

The Club's U19s' boys and U19s' girls play the T20 League.

=== Cricket tours ===
As well as providing opportunities for HKCC junior and senior teams to tour internationally, the Club has an international reputation for hosting touring teams from all over the world. The first recorded tour to Hong Kong was in 1866 by the Shanghai Cricket Club and the rivalry between the two clubs continues today. The last biannual Bokhara Memorial Bell fixture was played in August 2024 in Shanghai. More recently, the Club has hosted international women's teams from Nepal. Tanzania, Japan, Mainland China, Thailand and the UAE. International men's teams have toured from Bahrain, Italy, Singapore, Tanzania and Uganda, as well as New Zealand, Australia and Malaysia.

In November 2024, the Club provided cricket training and leisure facilities to the international teams participating in the International Cricket Sixes Tournament, held at Tin Kwong Road.

=== Sports Pathway program ===
The Club's Sporting Pathway Associate (SPA) programme is an elite junior sporting scholarship initiative open to talented Hong Kong residents aged between 12 and 29. The programme provides elite and emerging junior athletes with access to the Club’s facilities and in-house professional coaching, enabling them to participate in cricket and other sports at the highest levels and, most importantly, to instil a life-long affinity for their sport.

Two HKCC staff have gone on to represent Hong Kong at national level and in the 2017-18 season, eight of the touring Hong Kong national team were HKCC players.

=== Sporting Memberships ===
In 1993, the Club introduced two sporting membership schemes to provide valuable membership opportunities to talented young people. Currently, the Club has over 200 Sporting and Junior Sporting Members. Young athletes enjoy all the privileges of Membership including full access to the Club's facilities and coaches. Many young members have gone on to represent Hong Kong, China internationally. In the 2025 season, HKCC has eight men and 11 boys representing Hong Kong China internationally including the Hong Kong men’s captain and the Hong Kong women's captain.

=== Cricket trophies ===
HKCC-organised cricket shields and trophies are varied and competed for regularly. In addition to seasonal leagues, competitive HKCC honours include the Hancock Shield for matches versus Kowloon Cricket Club (first played in 1948), the Hazzard Shield of Australia v the Rest of the World (from 1948), the Laurie Roberts Trophy (from 2001), the Sithawalla Cup for matches against Singapore (from 1980), the Stragglers of Asia Cricket Club (from 1969), the Barton Cup (from 1924), the Bokhara Bell and the Ben Thorn Trophy, played at Yokohama (dating from before 1876).

=== Officials ===
The Club operates an extensive network of cricket officials, scorers and umpires.

=== Community engagement ===
HKCC has received multiple civic and community awards for its contributions to cricket and the Hong Kong international sporting community. Working with the local community and providing young people with opportunities to play cricket has always been a major mission of the Club. HKCC provides regular cricket training to numerous local and international schools, including ESF Schools, Kellet, Dalton School and the French International School. The Club also offers Gappers scholarships to students at local schools including TWGHs Hok Shan School and S.K.H. St. James' Primary School, allowing their students to benefit from regular cricket training. After only two seasons of training, both schools have joined the Cricket Hong Kong Primary School Playground League, where they participate in real match play.

== Other Club sports ==
Although since 1851 cricket has been the primary sport of the Hong Kong Cricket Club, HKCC activities have expanded to numerous other sports

In addition to cricket, HKCC collaborates with other NSA's (National Sporting Associations) to provide junior development and pathway programmes in tennis, squash, netball and hockey for both members and non-members. Reflecting the HKCC commitment to coaching excellence, most of the Club sports are played by athletes competing at Hong Kong international representative level.

=== Tennis (since 1851) ===
Tennis courts have been part of club life since its establishment. There are currently three outdoor tennis courts on Club premises, where about 200 juniors receive coaching each year. As of 2024, the Club fielded five men's teams and three women's' teams in both the HKCTA Summer and Winter Leagues, one mixed doubles team in the HKTA Mixed (I) Doubles League, and two teams in the Veterans 80+ League.

=== Croquet (since 1851) ===
Croquet, along with cricket and tennis, is a founding sport of the HKCC with the croquet green on the northern side of the main pitch. In October 2024, competing in Virginia for the first time in recorded history, a Hong Kong-based croquet player (HKCC Croquet Convenor, Tom Ingram) represented Hong Kong in an international Golf Croquet (GC) tournament.

=== Squash (since 1911) ===
Squash courts have been a part of HKCC facilities since 1911 and has 4 international standard courts. HKCC field men's and ladies' squash teams in the Hong Kong Winter League

=== Lawn bowls (since 1936) ===
Founded in 1936, dozens of Club lawn bowlers compete in men's and women's teams. The green is situated at the north-west corner of the Ground.

=== Netball (since 1984) ===
Netball is a thriving part of the HKCC community with over 200 active participants (in 2023). The club fields two teams in Hong Kong Division 1 and one team in each of divisions 2,3,4 and 5.

=== Hockey (since 2006) ===
Hockey is actively played by over 150 club members with the Club fielding multiple junior age teams (boys and girls up to U17), youth teams (from over 17 to U21), four women's teams (in Divisions 1, D2, D3 and D4) and three men's (D1, D2 and D4) teams. HKCC also field a Masters section."HKCC - Hockey section". HKCC - Hockey section. Retrieved 3 Feb 2024. https://www.hkcc.org/hockey-section. Quote: "HKCC Hockey are actively promoting the sport of hockey through coaching programmes involving local schools, as well supporting NGOs and recognised youth organisations working with disadvantaged youngsters. HKCC make the facilities of the club available to the wider community along with our expert coaches, inviting young people to get involved in the sport for the first time." Hockey is cultivated in the wider Hong Kong community through many initiatives including using club facilities for coaching and international tours.

HKCC make the facilities of the club available to the wider community along with expert coaches, inviting young people to get involved in sport for the first time.

=== Additional sporting activities ===
The HKCC clubhouse also has facilities for snooker, ten-pin bowling, table tennis and various fitness and junior sports. Golf is widely pursued by several hundred HKCC members and, as well as playing at regional golf courses, members may access two golf simulators.

== Club alignment with Hong Kong's Culture, Sports and Tourism Bureau ==
An important HKCC strategy is partnering with Hong Kong's Culture, Sports and Tourism Bureau (CTSB).

=== Promoting sports in the community ===
HKCC is a major supporter of sport in the local community. Bookings of facilities are open to non-members and all junior cricket up to the U17 age group is open to members and non-members alike, with scholarships available for eligible younger players. As at 2022 the HKCC had built partnerships with 26 schools across Hong Kong, ranging geographically from NTW & JWA Yuen Long nursery school, in Hong Kong's north near the China border, to the Ebeneezer school for the visually impaired in the south of Hong Kong island. In higher education, Hong Kong University and HKU Space are HKCC partners. HKCC operates active partnerships with 22 NGOs (in 2023), working to advance a variety of social and mental health initiatives expressed through sport, including the Caritas Community Centres in Ngau Tau Kok and Aberdeen, the New Life Psychiatric Rehabilitation Association, the Down Syndrome Foundation and HK Federation of Youth Groups.

The primary school cricket league is played on the HKCC ground and involves teams from Tung Wah Group of Hospitals Hok Shan school and the S.K.H. St. James' Primary School in Wan Chai plus teams from schools including Kellett and the English Schools Foundation. In July 2021, senior officials at the Po Leung Kuk registered appreciation to the HKCC for hosting bi-monthly sports days for their residential children over the recent decade (2014-2024). The Tung Wah Group of Hospitals Hok Shan School and the S.K.H. St James' Primary School, located in Kennedy Road, Hong Kong also expressed similar appreciation.

=== Supporting elite sports and national sporting associations ===
HKCC has a long-established tradition of supporting Hong Kong's NSA's running league matches and international tournaments. The HKCC partners with Cricket Hong Kong and nine similar NSAs in Hong Kong, including tennis, lawn bowls, squash, netball, hockey table tennis and several others. In the years immediately before Covid, the HKCC increased its playing hours offered to Eligible Outside Bodies (EOB), year-on-year, between 2014-2019, exceeding Hong Kong Government expectations and lease requirements.

The Club has introduced a Sport Pathway Programme to strengthen elite international performance. It is applicable for men and women and juniors. The aim is that "... both members and guests are exposed to world-class coaching... in the true spirit of sport the Club provides opportunities for all." By the early 2020s, student placements offered by HKCC had become a flourishing club tradition. Students from Eton College and Wesley College in Britain, Zhongshan University in China and Griffith University in Australia have participated. From 2001-2021, ten schools or higher education institutions in Hong Kong have attended HKCC work placements.

=== International sports fixtures ===
The third strand of HKCC support for the Culture, Sports and Tourism Bureau (CTSB) is ensuring international cricket is central to the HKCC and the Hong Kong sporting calendar. In men's cricket, as at 2023, HKCC has hosted and its members have participated in the men’s East-Asia Cup and the ICC World Cricket League Division 3. In women's elite cricket, the HKCC involvement includes multiple women's internationals, the women's Cricket World Cup Qualifier (Asia) and the women’s championship (East Asia). A highlight of the international cricket calendar is training sessions held at HKCC for the International Cricket Sixes.

By the early 2020s, the HKCC has partnered with three government departments, the Leisure and Cultural Services Department, which is the primary booking platform for sporting facilities territory-wide, the former Immigration Service Staff Association and Senior Police Call.

== Club support for philanthropic and social causes ==
The backbone of the Club's off-field contributions is active engagement by HKCC staff and over 100 volunteer members (2023 data, consistent over recent years).

=== Philanthropy ===
[edit | edit source] Annually in time for Chinese New Year, HKCC donations to the community are gathered for redistributions. In 2020, during the height of Covid restrictions, the Club collected boxed presents for distribution to the Po Leung Kuk, Love 21 Foundations, Branches of Hope, SOCO and Pathfinders. Four iPads were also donated to the Po Leung Kuk, 38 maternity packs for Pathfinders and 20 school packs through SOCO In 2021, HKCC volunteers also partnered with the Zubin Foundation to create over 50,000 meal boxes.

=== Staff volunteering ===
[edit | edit source] In 2013 the HKCC established a Staff Volunteering programme to advance Club support for community and to cultivate staff morale. Since 2008, the Club has undertaken multiple organic farming initiatives donating organic vegetables that it grows to rotating causes each year, ranging from the Hong Kong Spastic Association (2014) to winter melon crops for the St James Neighbourhood Elderly Centre (2019).

=== Employment practices ===
[edit | edit source] The Club prides itself on bonds between staff and members. HKCC trains staff for on average 1,400 hours per year. It has been recognised for various employment practices, including from the Hong Kong Equal Opportunities Commission (excellence as an "Equal Opportunity Employer for Racial Equality and Inclusion" (2021), the Hong Kong Council of Social Services (Caring Organisation, 2015–present) the Hong Kong General Chamber of Small and Medium Business (the Partner Employer Award for strengthening training opportunities and cultivating a caring culture, 2018-2023) and the Hong Kong Labour Department (the “Good Employer Charter 2020” for employee-oriented and progressive human resource management.

Travelling HKCC staff are encouraged to visit overseas cricket clubs such as Lord's and the MCC in Australia.

=== Environmental protection ===
[edit | edit source] In 2018, the Club signed the “Glass Container Recycling Charter” and from 2008 to 2024, HKCC has achieved the 'Class of Excellence' Award for Green Management from the HK Productivity Council. The club has active and long-established contacts with Hong Kong's turf management education and practices, such as Hong Kong Baptist University and elsewhere.

== Club history ==
HKCC history corresponds closely with Hong Kong's historical milestones. Following the city's foundation under British administration in 1842 as a consequence of the First Opium War, shortly afterwards the port's British community had sufficient interest to establish a cricket club. The HKCC has since flourished in every decade bar one, the Japanese occupation in the 1940s, with hundreds of thousands of spectators and tens of thousands of young Hong Kongers from varied schools and backgrounds encountering cricket and other sports through HKCC.

=== Establishment in 1851 ===
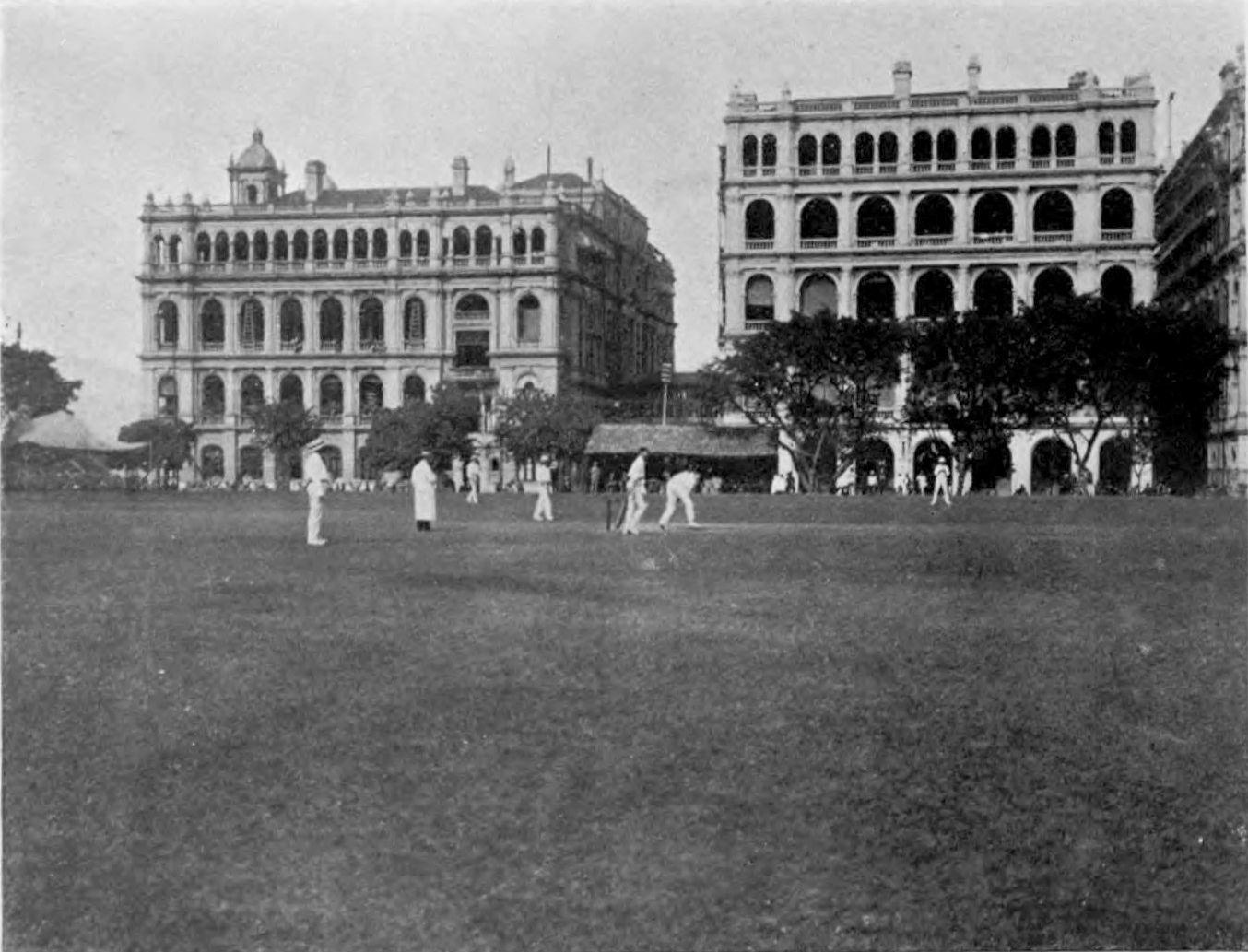
HKCC changed playing locations (1 of 2) Photo shows the Hong Kong Cricket Club in Central, Hong Kong in the 1900s. The site is now open to the public and occupied by Chater Garden, a park open to the public.

A meeting in 7 June 1851 proposed that a club with a turfed playing field be built on the Murray parade ground, creating one of the first cricket clubs outside England. Tennis and croquet sporting sections were also established. Advantageously situated on the Victoria harbour waterfront, a ceremonial stone stood near the cricket pavilion between 1890 and 1975. The stone was originally placed near the fence of the Cricket Club Pavilion. It was dismantled in 1975 and relocated to its present site in 1983.

=== 19th century ===
A cricket pavilion was constructed in 1893. Regular league cricket matches settled into the cricket calendar including home and away legs versus the Shanghai Cricket Club, first played in 1866 (home) and 1867 (away). Tragedy befell the 1892 away leg, in the era before air travel, when all but two players of the Hong Kong Cricket Club team drowned in the Pescadores Islands, on the passage home from Shanghai. The event is memorialised by the Bokhara Bell in the HKCC clubhouse.

=== 20th century ===
By the 20th century, cricket at the HKCC had become a regular fixture in Hong Kong weekends. The Club's cricket ground was also used occasionally for civic ceremonies, such as the 1901 coronation proclamation of Britain's King Edward VII. After a domestic cricket league was founded in the 1903-04 season, augmented by a further (second) division in 1921-22, squash (1911) and lawn bowls (1936) were added to HKCC sporting sections. A new pavilion was completed in 1923 and the inaugural Hong Kong men versus Hong Kong women's cricket match was played in 1924.

During the Japanese occupation in the early 1940s cricket was extinguished from city life, Club records were vandalised, and only basic ground maintenance happened. The HKCC resumed meetings in 11 February 1946, when the Chairman was thanked by acclimation, and the first post-war Hong Kong versus Kowloon cricket match was played later that year. The HKCC centenary was celebrated in 1951 when the Club's President lauded HKCC for its unique contributions to promoting cricket in Asia and encouraging fair play. A number of cricket matches commemorated the centenary, including HKCC v Rest of Hong Kong, a territory-wide selection, and HKCC v Singapore Combined Services. HKCC centenary programmes still sell at auction, seventy years later, into the 2020s.

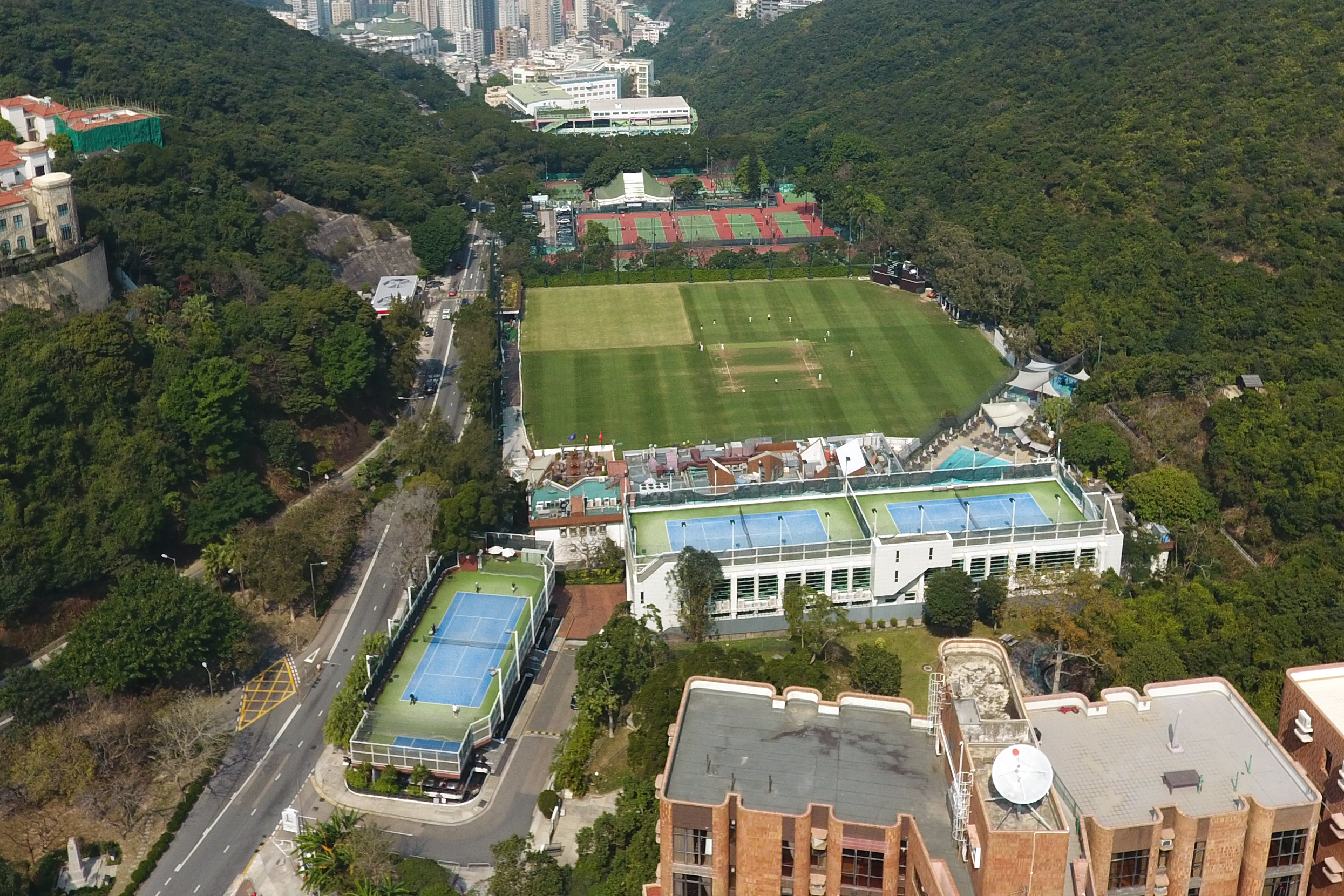
HKCC changed playing locations (2 of 2) Since 1975, HKCC has operated from a custom-designed location near Happy Valley. Photo above shows the Club viewed from the south, with the greens for lawn bowls and croquet visible adjacent to the cricket ground. The club tennis courts are elevated on rooftops (seen in blue above).

During 1975, the Club surrendered its cricket pitch in the heart of Hong Kong's Central District, immediately facing the LegCo building, and accepted the Hong Kong Government invitation to relocate to the Club's new home at Wong Nai Chung Gap, 6 km away. The old ground, on which cricket had been played for 124 years, was repurposed into Chater Garden, now an open amenity for the Hong Kong public. Amplifying the spirit of renewal and fresh starts, the opening of the new HKCC cricket ground was attended by prominent international cricketers English fast-bowler Harold Larwood and Australian wicket-keeper Bert Oldfield, who had opposed each other during the controversial Bodyline tour in Australia of 1932-33. HKCC v Kowloon Cricket Club, a central fixture of the Hong Kong cricketing calendar, was first played at the new ground in 1980.

From the start of the 20th century until the Japanese occupation, HKCC were First Division winners ten times, including a joint HKCC and Indian RC team, and after the occupation until the 1997 handover HKCC were winners twelve times, an overall win rate about 1-in-3.

=== 21st century ===
The club's 150th anniversary, held in 2001, was marked by varied celebrations, including a triangular series played at the HKCC versus select teams from the United Kingdom's Lord's and Australia's Melbourne Cricket Club. The club patron at the time, Tung Chee-Hwa commenting on 150 years of cricket, noted that "...cricket is an integral part of the heritage of Hong Kong." Reflecting on the Club's legacy as a conduit for international sport in the SAR, he added "...Hong Kong has a splendid reputation abroad as an excellent city in which to hold a sporting event. Cementing the Club's international stature, the home of cricket, Lord's, and Australia's premier cricket club, the Melbourne Cricket Club, promulgated reciprocal membership arrangements with HKCC. In keeping with the Club's maturing international stature, HKCC facilities were further expanded in 2009 with a new Sports Annexe and gym facilities.

The 150th anniversary of the Interport fixture, Hong Kong Cricket Club versus Shanghai Cricket Club, was played in December 2016, competing for the Bokhara Bell Trophy, in honour of the souls lost in 1892 shipwreck of the SS Bokhara, including eleven lives from the Hong Kong First XI.

Between 2002 and 2020, the HKCC completed 62 tours, all sports combined, to elsewhere in China, within Asia including Japan, Thailand, Vietnam and Singapore, to India, Australasia, South Africa and the United Kingdom. Marking increasing bonds with Cricket China, in 2009, on the HKCC women's tour to Shenzhen the Club played with the China national team. Between 2004 and 2019 the HKCC hosted 24 international and sporting events, including the Hong Kong Cricket Sixes in various years and the HKLBA Golden Jubilee International Bowls Classic (2011). Marking the Club's 170th anniversary, the Board of Cricket Hong Kong registered their appreciation to the HKCC in 2021 for "...their outstanding and unstinting support of cricket in Hong Kong."

As a fresh 21st century development for cricket conducted in native languages, HKCC established HKCC Qilin in 2019 and HKCC Yuen Mo in 2021, both teams founded on coaching and umpiring communications in Cantonese, aiming to embed cricket further within Hong Kong's sporting life.

== Club publications ==
HKCC has published two memoirs about the Club's historical bond with Hong Kong. 150 not out covers cricket in Hong Kong during the years 1851–2001, and 170 years of cricket in Hong Kong updates HKCCs considerable contributions to Hong Kong's cricketing community and sporting life up to 2021. The International Cricket Council, Marylebone Cricket Club in London, and Melbourne Cricket Club in Australia registered their congratulations to the HKCC when 170 years was published.

Since the 1960s, HKCC has published a magazine called The Pinkun for members ten times per year, in reference to the original paper stock. It also publishes a live television schedule.

== See also ==
- Cricket in Hong Kong
