= Natasha Miles =

Hong Kong cricketer

Personal information
- Full name: Natasha Tara Miles
- Born: 19 October 1988 (age 38); Hong Kong
- Batting: Right-handed
- Bowling: Right-arm medium
- Role: All-rounder

International information
- National side: Hong Kong (2021–present)
- T20I debut (cap 20): 22 November 2021 v Nepal
- Last T20I: 28 May 2026 v Malaysia

Domestic team information
- Years: Team
- 2007–2009: Surrey
- 2010–present: Middlesex
- 2010/11–2011/12: Otago
- 2016–2018: Lancashire Thunder

Career statistics
Competition	WT20I	WLA	WT20
Matches	31	105	137
Runs scored	632	1,893	1,875
Batting average	26.33	21.75	18.93
100s/50s	0/2	1/7	0/6
Top score	86*	100	86*
Balls bowled	–	2,516	735
Wickets	–	63	30
Bowling average	–	27.25	26.33
5 wickets in innings	–	1	0
10 wickets in match	–	0	0
Best bowling	–	5/31	3/17
Catches/stumpings	8/–	27/–	34/–
- Source: CricketArchive, 23 October 2023

Natasha Tara Miles (born 19 October 1988) is a British Hong Kong cricketer who plays for the Hong Kong women's national cricket team and Middlesex in English county cricket. An all-rounder, she is a right-handed batter and right-arm medium bowler. She has previously played for Surrey and Otago, as well as Lancashire Thunder in the Women's Cricket Super League. She first played for Hong Kong in 2006, and made her Twenty20 International debut in 2021.

== Early life ==
Miles was born on 19 October 1988 in Hong Kong. She is the daughter of Rodney and Anita Wu Mui Chu Miles.

Miles grew up in Hong Kong where she attended Island School. Her father, an Englishman, established a cosmetics firm in Hong Kong and served as president of the Hong Kong Cricket Association. Her Chinese mother was a pioneer of women's cricket in Hong Kong, helping establish the national women's league in 2004.

== Domestic career ==
=== Hong Kong ===
Miles began playing in men's leagues in Hong Kong at the age of 15, representing Craigengower Cricket Club (CCC) and Nomads. During the 2005-06 season, she took 6/53 for CCC in the final of the HKCA Saturday League and also became the first woman to play in the Sunday Cup.

=== County cricket ===
Miles made her county debut in 2007, for Surrey against Somerset. Overall that season she took 5 wickets at an average of 20.40. In 2009, she took 7 wickets in the County Championship, as well as helping Surrey win the inaugural Twenty20 Cup.

In 2010, Miles moved to Middlesex. She hit her maiden county half-century that season, scoring 50 against Worcestershire, as well as taking 13 wickets at an average of 18.07 in the County Championship. She took her maiden five-wicket haul the following season, with 5/31 Yorkshire. In 2013, Miles was Middlesex's leading run-scorer in the County Championship, with 317 runs including her maiden county century, scoring 100 against Kent. The following season, she was her side's leading run-scorer in both competitions, with 247 runs in the County Championship and 166 in the Twenty20 Cup. Miles played primarily as a batter over subsequent seasons, and consistently scored over 100 runs a season in the County Championship, as well as helping her side win the 2018 Women's Twenty20 Cup. She played eight matches for the side in the 2021 Women's Twenty20 Cup, scoring 51 runs. She played four matches in the 2022 Women's Twenty20 Cup, scoring 151 runs including two half-centuries. She has also captained Middlesex in 13 T20s between 2017 and 2022.

=== Kia Super League ===
Miles played for Lancashire Thunder in the Women's Cricket Super League between 2016 and 2018. She played 7 matches in 2016 and 2017, scoring 7 runs and taking 3 catches.

=== Other domestic cricket ===
Miles played for Otago in the 2010–11 and 2011–12 seasons. She was the joint-leading wicket-taker across the whole tournament in the Twenty20 competition in 2010–11, with 14 wickets at an average of 14.64. In her second season with the side, she took 10 wickets across the two competitions.

Miles also appeared in the Super Fours between 2011 and 2013, for Emeralds and Sapphires. In 2012, she took 4/51 for Emeralds in a match against Diamonds.

== International career ==
In 2006, Miles was named in the squad for Hong Kong's first international series, a tour of Pakistan. She appeared in the team's three 50-over matches against Pakistan, which formed the Asian sub-qualifier for the 2008 Women's Cricket World Cup Qualifier. She scored 56 runs across the three matches and taking one wicket.

Miles stopped playing for Hong Kong in order to attempt to play for England, but did appear for them in one match against Marylebone Cricket Club Women in 2018, where she captained the side and top scored with 42. She has also represented England Academy Women cricket team from 2012 till 2014.

In October 2021, it was announced that Miles was returning to play for Hong Kong, being named in their squad for the 2021 ICC Women's T20 World Cup Asia Qualifier. This followed a change in ICC eligibility criteria that allowed cricketers to play for associate member teams while remaining eligible to play for full members, thus with Miles remaining eligible for England.

Miles made her Women's Twenty20 International (WT20I) debut on 22 November 2021, against Nepal, scoring 16 off 13 deliveries. She played all five matches in the tournament, scoring 127 runs, the third most for her side, including hitting 40* against Kuwait. In April 2022, Miles played in Hong Kong's series against the UAE, but scored just 11 runs in the four match series. In June 2022, she played four matches in the 2022 ACC Women's T20 Championship, scoring 82 runs. In November 2022, she was the leading run-scorer at the East Asia Cup, with 149 runs at an average of 74.50, including making her Twenty20 high score in the third match of the tournament, with 86* from 70 deliveries. In 2023, she was Hong Kong's second-highest run-scorer at the Capricorn Women's Quadrangular Series, with 114 runs including one half-century.
