= Emma Lai =

Hong Kong cricketer

Personal information
- Full name: Wing Ki Lai
- Born: 14 March 1988 (age 38)
- Batting: Right-handed
- Bowling: Right-arm medium
- Role: Bowler

International information
- National side: Hong Kong
- T20I debut (cap 13): 13 January 2019 v Bhutan
- Last T20I: 28 May 2026 v Malaysia

Domestic team information
- Years: Team
- Hong Kong Cricket Club
- 2016–17: Perth Scorchers

Career statistics
Competition	WT20I
Matches	29
Runs scored	101
Batting average	6.73
100s/50s	0/0
Top score	20*
Balls bowled	60
Wickets	4
Bowling average	12.50
5 wickets in innings	0
10 wickets in match	0
Best bowling	2/13
Catches/stumpings	3/–
- Source: Cricinfo, 30 October 2024

Wing Ki Lai or Emma Lai (born March 14, 1988) is a Hong Kong cricketer who plays for Hong Kong women's national cricket team. She started learning to play cricket while working as a waitress at the Hong Kong Cricket Club. Just over a year after her first cricket lesson, she travelled to Kuwait as part of the Hong Kong squad, and a year later, she played in her first game for Hong Kong against Thailand.

Lai is often described as the captain of the Hong Kong women's team, and she did captain Hong Kong to the final of the East Asia Women's T20 Championship, in which Hong Kong finished second to China. However, she has since reverted to being just a player. In the Women's Big Bash League Twenty20 competition's WBBL02 season in 2016–17, she was the Associate Rookie for Perth Scorchers.

As of early 2017, Lai was a cricket officer for Cricket Hong Kong, running and planning coaching clinics, conducting demonstrations in schools and also doing some promotion.

In May 2021, she was named in Bauhinia Stars' squad for the 2021 Hong Kong Women's Premier League.
