= Kary Chan =

Hong Kong cricketer

Personal information
- Full name: Kary Ka Ying Chan
- Born: 13 March 1997 (age 29); British Hong Kong
- Batting: Left-handed
- Bowling: Slow left-arm unorthodox|Left-arm wrist spin
- Role: All-rounder

International information
- National side: Hong Kong
- T20I debut (cap 2): 12 January 2019 v Indonesia
- Last T20I: 26 May 2026 v Thailand

Career statistics
Competition	WT20I
Matches	64
Runs scored	1,046
Batting average	20.92
100s/50s	0/3
Top score	87
Balls bowled	1,251
Wickets	82
Bowling average	11.75
5 wickets in innings	3
10 wickets in match	0
Best bowling	5/4
Catches/stumpings	21/–
- Source: Cricinfo, 7 October 2024

Kary Ka Ying Chan (Chinese: 陳嘉瑩; born 13 March 1997) is a Hong Kong cricketer and the captain of the Hong Kong women's national cricket team.

Chan made her Women's Twenty20 International (WT20I) debut on 12 January 2019, for Hong Kong against Indonesia in the 2019 Thailand Women's T20 Smash. In September 2019, Chan was named as the captain of the Hong Kong squad for the 2019 Women's Twenty20 East Asia Cup. In Hong Kong's opening match of the tournament, against China, Chan took a five-wicket haul, which included the first hat-trick for the Hong Kong women's team in international cricket. She finished as the leading wicket-taker in the tournament, with ten dismissals in four matches.

In October 2020, Chan was named as the captain of the Bauhinia Stars in the 2021 Hong Kong Women's Premier League. In October 2021, Chan was named as the captain of Hong Kong's side for the 2021 ICC Women's T20 World Cup Asia Qualifier tournament in the United Arab Emirates.
