= Mariko Hill =

Hong Kong cricketer (born 1995)

Personal information
- Full name: Mariko Tabitha Hill
- Born: 20 November 1995 (age 30); Hong Kong
- Batting: Right-handed
- Bowling: Right-arm medium
- Role: All-rounder

International information
- National side: Hong Kong
- T20I debut (cap 5): 12 January 2019 v Indonesia
- Last T20I: 13 October 2024 v Japan

Domestic team information
- Years: Team
- 2022: Northern Diamonds
- 2023–present: Middlesex

Career statistics
Competition	WT20I
Matches	65
Runs scored	1,390
Batting average	26.22
100s/50s	1/6
Top score	100*
Balls bowled	984
Wickets	43
Bowling average	19.06
5 wickets in innings	1
10 wickets in match	0
Best bowling	5/2
Catches/stumpings	24/–
- Source: Cricinfo, 30 October 2024

Mariko Tabitha Hill (born 20 November 1995) is a Hong Kong cricketer who plays for Hong Kong women's national cricket team and is a former captain. She has represented Hong Kong at 2010 Asian Games and the 2014 Asian Games. In May 2021, she was named in the Jade Jets' squad for the 2021 Hong Kong Women's Premier League. In April 2022, it was announced that she would be training with Northern Diamonds for the upcoming season, whilst other overseas experience include the Women's Big Bash League in Melbourne and Middlesex county cricket in the UK. In May 2022, she was added to the side's full squad, and made her debut for the Diamonds on 29 May against North West Thunder.

On 19 November 2023, Hill took her first Women's Twenty20 International (WT20I) five wicke haul with 5/2 against Tanzania.

On 11 February 2024, Hill made her maiden WT20I century, scoring 100 not out against the Maldives at the ACC Women's Premier Cup in Malaysia. In 2024 Hill broke into the World's Top 100 women for both batting and as an all-rounder and was included in the Indian WIPL auction list. In January 2026 Hong Kong won the inaugural Lotus Cup in Bhutan, going undefeated throughout the tournament. Hill made 65 off 53 balls in the final to lead her team to victory.
