= 2015 Women's World Twenty20 Qualifier =

International women's cricket tournament held in Thailand in 2015

2015 ICC Women's World Twenty20 Qualifier
- Dates: 28 November 2015 – 5 December 2015
- Administrator: International Cricket Council
- Cricket format: 20 overs, Twenty20 International
- Tournament format(s): Group round-robin and play-offs
- Host: Thailand
- Champions: Ireland (1st title)
- Runners-up: Bangladesh
- Participants: 8
- Matches: 20
- Player of the series: (Bangladesh) Rumana Ahmed
- Most runs: (Ireland) Cecelia Joyce (184)
- Most wickets: (Bangladesh) Rumana Ahmed (16)

The 2015 ICC Women's World Twenty20 Qualifier was an international women's cricket tournament held in Thailand from 28 November to 5 December 2015. It was the second edition of the Women's World Twenty20 Qualifier.

Eight teams contested the tournament, with the hosts, Thailand, being joined by the bottom two teams from the 2014 World Twenty20 and five regional qualifiers. Ireland defeated Bangladesh in the final by two wickets, with both teams qualifying for the 2016 World Twenty20 tournament in India. Bangladesh's Rumana Ahmed was the player of the tournament as the leading wicket-taker, while Ireland's Cecelia Joyce led the tournament in runs. All matches were played in Bangkok, with two grounds being used (the Thailand Cricket Ground and the Asian Institute of Technology Ground).

== Qualification and format ==
The tournament involved eight teams, the same number as at the inaugural 2013 edition. For the preliminary stages of the tournament, the teams were divided into two groups of four, with the top two in each group moving into the semi-finals. The two winners of the semi-finals qualified for the 2016 World Twenty20. As in the 2013 tournament, the four teams that failed to make the semi-finals played off in a repechage competition (referred to as the Shield).

Of the eight teams, two (Bangladesh and Ireland) qualified automatically by finishing in the last two places at the 2014 World Twenty20. Thailand qualified for the tournament as the host, while the other five teams qualified through regional tournaments. Teams from the ICC Americas region were unable to qualify for the tournament, as funding had been withdrawn for the ICC Americas Women's Championship in 2014, leading to its cancellation. Instead, Europe was given an additional qualification spot. Bangladesh, China, Papua New Guinea, and Scotland participated in the Women's World Twenty20 Qualifier for the first time.

Team	Qualification
Thailand	Tournament host
Bangladesh	2014 World Twenty20
China	ACC representative
Ireland	2014 World Twenty20
Netherlands	ICC Europe representative (1)
Papua New Guinea	ICC East Asia-Pacific representative
Scotland	ICC Europe representative (2)
Zimbabwe	ICC Africa representative

== Squads ==
Bangladesh Coach: Janak Gamage	China	Ireland Coach: Aaron Hamilton	Netherlands Coach: Peter Cantrell
Jahanara Alam (c); Ayasha Rahman (vc); Rumana Ahmed; Sharmin Akhter; Nahida Akter; Fargana Hoque; Panna Ghosh; Khadija Tul Kubra; Fahima Khatun; Salma Khatun; Lata Mondal; Ritu Moni; Shaila Sharmin; Nigar Sultana (wk)	Huang Zhuo (c); Caiyun Zhou; Chai Yudian (wk); Han Lili; Li Yingying; Liu Jie; Reziye; Song Fengfeng; Sun Meng Yao; Tian Qi; Wang Meng; Wu Juan; Xiang Ruan; Zhao Ning	Isobel Joyce (c); Catherine Dalton; Laura Delany; Kim Garth; Jenny Gray; Cecelia Joyce; Shauna Kavanagh; Amy Kenealy; Gaby Lewis; Robyn Lewis; Ciara Metcalfe; Lucy O'Reilly; Clare Shillington; Mary Waldron (wk)	Esther de Lange (c); Miranda Veringmeier (vc, wk); Carmela Appel; Esther Corder; Christine Erkelens; Sterre Kalis; Lisa Klokgieters; Babette de Leede (wk); Juliët Post; Robine Rijke; Heather Siegers (wk); Cher van Slobbe; Annemijn Thomson; Coco Toussaint
Papua New Guinea Coach: Rodney Maha	Scotland Player-coach: Kari Anderson	Thailand	Zimbabwe Coach: Trevor Phiri
Norma Ovasuru (c); Tanya Ruma (vc); Seilosi Ambo; Kaia Arua; Helen Buruka; Veru Frank; Sibona Jimmy; Kopi John; Varoi Morea (wk); Ravina Oa; Kari Seura; Pauke Siaka; Brenda Tau; Mairi Tom	Abbi Aitken (c); Kari Anderson; Kathryn Bryce; Sarah Bryce (wk); Annette Drummond; Kirstie Gordon; Samantha Haggo; Lorna Jack (wk); Abtaha Maqsood; Katie McGill; Liz Priddle; Ollie Rae; Rachel Scholes; Fiona Urquhart	Sornnarin Tippoch (c); Nattaya Boochatham; Naruemol Chaiwai (wk); Premwadee Doungsin; Onnicha Kamchomphu; Nannapat Koncharoenkai; Suleeporn Laomi; Soraya Lateh; Wongpaka Liengprasert; Sirintra Saengsakaorat; Sainammin Saenya; Kanokwan Saesong; Rattana Sangsoma; Chanida Sutthiruang	Chipo Mugeri (c); Precious Marange (vc); Christabel Chatonzwa; Tasmeen Granger; Sharne Mayers; Audrey Mazvishaya; Thandakwenkosi Mlilo; Pellagia Mujaji; Modester Mupachikwa (wk); Mary-Anne Musonda; Nomatter Mutasa; Josephine Nkomo; Nonhlahla Nyathi (wk); Loreen Tshuma

== Group stages ==
=== Group A ===
Source: ESPNcricinfo

Team	Pld	W	L	T	NR	Pts	NRR
Bangladesh	3	3	0	0	0	6	+2.518
Scotland	3	2	1	0	0	4	–0.048
Papua New Guinea	3	1	2	0	0	2	–0.831
Thailand	3	0	3	0	0	0	–1.603

Key
Advanced to finals stage
Advanced to shield stage

28 November 2015
10:00
Scorecard

Bangladesh; 105/6 (20 overs)	v	Thailand; 32 (14.4 overs)
Ayasha Rahman 30 (32); Suleeporn Laomi 2/17 (4 overs)		Chanida Sutthiruang 13 (18); Fahima Khatun 2/1 (1.4 overs)

Bangladesh won by 73 runs
Terdthai Cricket Ground, Bangkok
Umpires: Allan Haggo (Sco) and Claire Polosak (Aus)
Player of the match: Ayasha Rahman (Ban)

- Thailand won the toss and elected to field.

28 November 2015
13:45
Scorecard

Papua New Guinea; 53 (19.2 overs)	v	Scotland; 55/2 (15.4 overs)
Sibona Jimmy 13 (22); Abtaha Maqsood 2/9 (4 overs)		Kari Anderson 24* (40); Pauke Siaka 1/11 (4 overs)

Scotland won by 8 wickets
Terdthai Cricket Ground, Bangkok
Umpires: Kathy Cross (NZ) and Nigel Morrison (Van)
Player of the match: Kari Anderson (Sco)

- Scotland won the toss and elected to field.

29 November 2015
10:00
Scorecard

Scotland; 53 (19.1 overs)	v	Bangladesh; 54/2 (12.4 overs)
Kathryn Bryce 12 (18); Rumana Ahmed 3/9 (4 overs)		Sharmin Akhter 26 (35); Rachel Scholes 1/6 (2 overs)

Bangladesh won by 8 wickets
Asian Institute of Technology Ground, Bangkok
Umpires: Sue Redfern (Eng) and Jacqueline Williams (WI)
Player of the match: Rumana Ahmed (Ban)

- Bangladesh won the toss and elected to field.

29 November 2015
13:45
Scorecard

Thailand; 70/6 (20 overs)	v	Papua New Guinea; 71/3 (17 overs)
Naruemol Chaiwai 22 (46); Norma Ovasuru 3/13 (4 overs)		Norma Ovasuru 36 (52); Sornnarin Tippoch 1/10 (3 overs)

Papua New Guinea won by 7 wickets
Asian Institute of Technology Ground, Bangkok
Umpires: Nigel Morrison (Van) and Sue Redfern (Eng)
Player of the match: Norma Ovasuru (PNG)

- Papua New Guinea won the toss and elected to field.

1 December 2015
10:00
Scorecard

Thailand; 74/7 (20 overs)	v	Scotland; 75/4 (18.2 overs)
Chanida Sutthiruang 21 (25); Kari Anderson 2/13 (4 overs)		Rachel Scholes 32 (43); Sornnarin Tippoch 2/20 (4 overs)

Scotland won by 6 wickets
Terdthai Cricket Ground, Bangkok
Umpires: Claire Polosak (Aus) and Jacqueline Williams (WI)
Player of the match: Rachel Scholes (Sco)

- Scotland won the toss and elected to field.

1 December 2015
10:00
Scorecard

Bangladesh; 100/7 (20 overs)	v	Papua New Guinea; 59 (19.5 overs)
Fargana Hoque 28 (30); Kari Seura 2/2 (3 overs)		Veru Frank 13* (19); Khadija Tul Kubra 5/11 (4 overs)

Bangladesh won by 41 runs
Asian Institute of Technology Ground, Bangkok
Umpires: Kathy Cross (NZ) and Nigel Morrison (Van)
Player of the match: Khadija Tul Kubra (Ban)

- Papua New Guinea won the toss and elected to field.

=== Group B ===
Source: ESPNcricinfo

Team	Pld	W	L	T	NR	Pts	NRR
Ireland	3	3	0	0	0	6	+1.743
Zimbabwe	3	2	1	0	0	4	–0.221
China	3	1	2	0	0	2	–0.489
Netherlands	3	0	3	0	0	0	–1.036

Key
Advanced to finals stage
Advanced to shield stage

28 November 2015
10:00
Scorecard

Netherlands; 90/6 (20 overs)	v	Ireland; 91/2 (11.5 overs)
Miranda Veringmeier 53 (46); Isobel Joyce 3/18 (4 overs)		Cecelia Joyce 39 (30); Sterre Kalis 1/9 (2 overs)

Ireland won by 8 wickets
Asian Institute of Technology Ground, Bangkok
Umpires: Nigel Morrison (Van) and Sue Redfern (Eng)
Player of the match: Miranda Veringmeier (Ned)

- Netherlands won the toss and elected to bat.

28 November 2015
13:45
Scorecard

China; 88/5 (20 overs)	v	Zimbabwe; 89/0 (18.2 overs)
Huang Zhuo 24* (28); Audrey Mazvishaya 1/11 (3 overs)		Chipo Mugeri 51* (61)

Zimbabwe won by 10 wickets
Asian Institute of Technology Ground, Bangkok
Umpires: Allan Haggo (Sco) and Jacqueline Williams (WI)
Player of the match: Chipo Mugeri (Zim)

- Zimbabwe won the toss and elected to field.

29 November 2015
10:00
Scorecard

Ireland; 104/6 (20 overs)	v	China; 76/7 (20 overs)
Isobel Joyce 41* (36); Xiang Ruan 1/12 (2 overs)		Huang Zhuo 39* (34); Isobel Joyce 2/11 (4 overs)

Ireland won by 28 runs
Terdthai Cricket Ground, Bangkok
Umpires: Kathy Cross (NZ) and Claire Polosak (Aus)
Player of the match: Isobel Joyce (Ire)

- Ireland won the toss and elected to bat.

29 November 2015
13:45
Scorecard

Zimbabwe; 110/5 (20 overs)	v	Netherlands; 108/4 (20 overs)
Precious Marange 24* (21); Esther de Lange 2/16 (4 overs)		Sterre Kalis 49 (62); Tasmeen Granger 1/13 (4 overs)

Zimbabwe won by 2 runs
Terdthai Cricket Ground, Bangkok
Umpires: Allan Haggo (Sco) and Claire Polosak (Aus)
Player of the match: Precious Marange (Zim)

- Netherlands won the toss and elected to field.

1 December 2015
13:45
Scorecard

Zimbabwe; 78 (19 overs)	v	Ireland; 79/3 (15.2 overs)
Modester Mupachikwa 15 (30); Isobel Joyce 4/20 (4 overs)		Cecelia Joyce 36 (37); Chipo Mugeri 1/17 (4 overs)

Ireland won by 7 wickets
Terdthai Cricket Ground, Bangkok
Umpires: Sue Redfern (Eng) and Jacqueline Williams (WI)
Player of the match: Isobel Joyce (Ire)

- Ireland won the toss and elected to field.

1 December 2015
13:45
Scorecard

Netherlands; 101/6 (20 overs)	v	China; 103/5 (18.4 overs)
Miranda Veringmeier 26 (25); Liu Jie 1/15 (4 overs)		Huang Zhuo 40* (54); Heather Siegers 2/17 (3 overs)

China won by 5 wickets
Asian Institute of Technology Ground, Bangkok
Umpires: Kathy Cross (NZ) and Allan Haggo (Sco)
Player of the match: Huang Zhuo (Chn)

- Netherlands won the toss and elected to bat.

== Shield competition ==
=== Shield semi-finals ===
3 December 2015
10:00
Scorecard

Netherlands; 105/4 (20 overs)	v	Papua New Guinea; 106/9 (20 overs)
Sterre Kalis 33* (46); Norma Ovasuru 1/15 (3 overs)		Pauke Siaka 34 (29); Christine Erkelens 3/9 (4 overs)

Papua New Guinea won by 1 wicket
Asian Institute of Technology Ground, Bangkok
Umpires: Nigel Morrison (Van) and Sue Redfern (Eng)
Player of the match: Pauke Siaka (PNG)

- Papua New Guinea won the toss and elected to field.

3 December 2015
13:45
Scorecard

China; 82 (20 overs)	v	Thailand; 77/8 (20 overs)
Caiyun Zhou 31 (40); Suleeporn Laomi 2/16 (4 overs)		Onnicha Kamchomphu 11* (13); Li Yingying 2/3 (4 overs)

China won by 5 runs
Asian Institute of Technology Ground, Bangkok
Umpires: Allan Haggo (Sco) and Nigel Morrison (Van)
Player of the match: Li Yingying (Chn)

- Thailand won the toss and elected to field.

=== Shield final ===
5 December 2015
13:45
Scorecard

China; 93/4 (20 overs)	v	Papua New Guinea; 94/3 (18.4 overs)
Caiyun Zhou 26 (37); Ravina Oa 1/14 (3 overs)		Tanya Ruma 37* (39); Song Fengfeng 1/20 (3 overs)

Papua New Guinea won by 7 wickets
Asian Institute of Technology Ground, Bangkok
Umpires: Allan Haggo (Sco) and Sue Redfern (Eng)
Player of the match: Tanya Ruma (PNG)

- China won the toss and elected to bat.

== Finals ==
=== Semi-finals ===
3 December 2015
10:00
Scorecard

Bangladesh; 89/5 (20 overs)	v	Zimbabwe; 58 (19.1 overs)
Fargana Hoque 43 (43); Josephine Nkomo 2/12 (4 overs)		Pellagia Mujaji 10 (10); Rumana Ahmed 4/8 (4 overs)

Bangladesh won by 31 runs
Terdthai Cricket Ground, Bangkok
Umpires: Kathy Cross (NZ) and Claire Polosak (Aus)
Player of the match: Rumana Ahmed (Ban)

- Zimbabwe won the toss and elected to field.

3 December 2015
13:45
Scorecard

Scotland; 77/9 (20 overs)	v	Ireland; 79/1 (11.3 overs)
Fiona Urquhart 21 (32); Lucy O'Reilly 3/16 (4 overs)		Cecelia Joyce 36* (34); Kirstie Gordon 1/33 (3 overs)

Ireland won by 9 wickets
Terdthai Cricket Ground, Bangkok
Umpires: Claire Polosak (Aus) and Jacqueline Williams (WI)
Player of the match: Lucy O'Reilly (Ire)

- Ireland won the toss and elected to field.

=== Final ===
5 December 2015
13:45
Scorecard

Bangladesh; 105/3 (20 overs)	v	Ireland; 106/8 (20 overs)
Nigar Sultana 41 (57); Ciara Metcalfe 3/14 (4 overs)		Cecelia Joyce 32 (30); Rumana Ahmed 2/16 (4 overs)

Ireland won by 2 wickets
Terdthai Cricket Ground, Bangkok
Umpires: Kathy Cross (NZ) and Claire Polosak (Aus)
Player of the match: Rumana Ahmed (Ban)

- Bangladesh won the toss and elected to bat.
- Catherine Dalton and Robyn Lewis (Ire) both made their T20I debuts.

== Placement matches ==
=== 3rd place play-off ===
5 December 2015
10:00
Scorecard

Scotland; 94/4 (20 overs)	v	Zimbabwe; 95/7 (19.5 overs)
Fiona Urquhart 19 (21); Chipo Mugeri 2/17 (4 overs)		Chipo Mugeri 47* (59); Kirstie Gordon 3/21 (4 overs)

Zimbabwe won by 3 wickets
Asian Institute of Technology Ground, Bangkok
Umpires: Claire Polosak (Aus) and Jacqueline Williams (WI)
Player of the match: Chipo Mugeri (Zim)

- Zimbabwe won the toss and elected to field.

=== 7th place play-off ===
5 December 2015
10:00
Scorecard

Netherlands; 70 (19 overs)	v	Thailand; 71/1 (14.1 overs)
Sterre Kalis 21 (28); Sornnarin Tippoch 2/11 (4 overs)		Naruemol Chaiwai 34* (51); Esther de Lange 1/12 (4 overs)

Thailand won by 9 wickets
Terdthai Cricket Ground, Bangkok
Umpires: Nigel Morrison (Van) and Sue Redfern (Eng)
Player of the match: Naruemol Chaiwai (Tha)

- Thailand won the toss and elected to field.

== Statistics ==
=== Most runs ===
The top five run scorers (total runs) are included in this table.

Player	Team	Runs	Inns	Avg	S/R	Highest	100s	50s
Cecelia Joyce	Ireland	152	5	38.00	107.04	39	0	0
Huang Zhou	China	122	5	122.00	88.41	40*	0	0
Sterre Kalis	Netherlands	122	5	30.50	67.77	49	0	0
Chipo Mugeri	Zimbabwe	120	5	40.00	75.00	51*	0	1
Miranda Veringmeier	Netherlands	119	5	23.80	100.85	53	0	1

Source: ESPNcricinfo

=== Most wickets ===
The top five wicket takers are listed in this table, listed by wickets taken and then by bowling average.

Player	Team	Overs	Wkts	Ave	SR	Econ	BBI
Rumana Ahmed	Bangladesh	19.0	14	3.64	8.14	2.68	4/8
Isobel Joyce	Ireland	18.0	10	8.10	10.80	4.50	4/20
Kirstie Gordon	Scotland	18.0	8	11.62	13.50	5.17	3/21
Khadija Tul Kubra	Bangladesh	20.0	7	6.14	17.14	2.87	5/11
Ciara Metcalfe	Ireland	15.0	7	10.71	12.86	3.75	3/14

Source: ESPNcricinfo

== Final standings ==
Position	Team
1st	Ireland
2nd	Bangladesh
3rd	Zimbabwe
4th	Scotland
5th	Papua New Guinea
6th	China
7th	Thailand
8th	Netherlands

Qualified for the 2016 World Twenty20.
