= Christine Erkelens =

Dutch cricketer (born 1991)

Personal information
- Born: 27 October 1991 (age 35); Leiden, Netherlands

International information
- National side: Netherlands
- Source: ESPNcricinfo, 13 February 2017

Christine Erkelens (born 27 October 1991) is a Dutch cricketer.

== Cricketing Career ==
She played in five matches for the Netherlands women's national cricket team in the 2015 ICC Women's World Twenty20 Qualifier in November and December 2015. In the match against China, Erkelens was reported for a suspect bowling action.
