= 2016 Women's World Twenty20 =

5th edition of the Women's T20 World Cup

- Dates: 15 March – 3 April 2016
- Administrator: International Cricket Council
- Cricket format: Women's Twenty20 International
- Tournament format(s): Group stage and knockout
- Host: India
- Champions: West Indies (1st title)
- Runners-up: Australia
- Participants: 10
- Matches: 23
- Player of the series: (Cricket West Indies) Stafanie Taylor
- Most runs: (Cricket West Indies) Stafanie Taylor (246)
- Most wickets: (New Zealand) Leigh Kasperek (New Zealand) Sophie Devine (Cricket West Indies) Deandra Dottin (9)
- Official website: iccworldtwenty20.com

The 2016 Women's World Twenty20 was the fifth edition of the Women's World Twenty20, the world championship of women's Twenty20 International cricket. India hosted the event for the first time, with matches played from 15 March to 3 April 2016. The tournament was run simultaneously with the men's World Twenty20, with the final of each tournament played on the same day at the same venue (at Eden Gardens, Kolkata). In the tournament final, the West Indies defeated defending champions Australia by eight wickets, claiming their first title. West Indian captain Stafanie Taylor was named Player of the Tournament, having scored more runs than any other player.

== Teams and qualification ==
The top eight teams from the 2014 tournament earned direct qualification to the 2016 tournament. The remaining two spots were decided at the 2015 World Twenty20 Qualifier, with Bangladesh and Ireland qualifying:

Team	Qualification tournament	Standing
Australia	2014 ICC Women's World Twenty20	Winner
England	2014 ICC Women's World Twenty20	Runner-up
West Indies	2014 ICC Women's World Twenty20	Semi-finalist
South Africa	2014 ICC Women's World Twenty20	Semi-finalist
India (host)	2014 ICC Women's World Twenty20	Fifth
New Zealand	2014 ICC Women's World Twenty20	Sixth
Pakistan	2014 ICC Women's World Twenty20	Seventh
Sri Lanka	2014 ICC Women's World Twenty20	Eighth
Ireland	2015 ICC Women's World Twenty20 Qualifier	Winner
Bangladesh	2015 ICC Women's World Twenty20 Qualifier	Runner-up

== Venues ==
On 21 July 2015, the Indian cricket board announced the name of the eight hosting cities (Bengaluru, Chennai, Dharamshala, Mohali, Mumbai, Nagpur and New Delhi) along with Kolkata, which would host the final of the event.

Dharamshala	Mohali	Delhi
Himachal Pradesh Cricket Association Stadium	Punjab Cricket Association IS Bindra Stadium	Feroz Shah Kotla Ground
Capacity: 23,000	Capacity: 26,950	Capacity: 40,715
2 Group matches	3 Group matches	5 Group matches, 1 Semi-final
Mumbai	2016 Women's World Twenty20 (India)	Kolkata
Wankhede Stadium	2016 Women's World Twenty20 (India)	Eden Gardens
Capacity: 32,000	2016 Women's World Twenty20 (India)	Capacity: 66,349
1 Semi-final	2016 Women's World Twenty20 (India)	Final
Bengaluru	Nagpur	Chennai
M. Chinnaswamy Stadium	Vidarbha Cricket Association Stadium	M. A. Chidambaram Stadium
Capacity: 40,000	Capacity: 45,000	Capacity: 38,000
4 Group matches	2 Group matches	4 Group matches

== Warm-up matches ==
A total of 9 warm-up matches were played between 10 and 14 March in Bengaluru (at M. Chinnaswamy Stadium) and Chennai (at M. A. Chidambaram Stadium) featuring 9 of the tournament's 10 participating teams.

Warm-up matches

10 March
15:00
Scorecard

India; 147/4 (20 overs)	v	Ireland; 118/9 (20 overs)
Smriti Mandhana 73* (52); Kim Garth 3/16 (4 overs)		Catherine Dalton 37 (30); Niranjana Nagarajan 2/17 (4 overs)

India won by 29 runs
M. Chinnaswamy Stadium, Bengaluru
Umpires: Ranmore Martinesz (SL) and Joel Wilson (WI)

- India won the toss and elected to bat.

10 March
19:30 (D/N)
Scorecard

Bangladesh; 95 (19.5 overs)	v	Sri Lanka; 97/5 (18.1 overs)
Nigar Sultana 33 (39); Oshadi Ranasinghe 3/14 (2.5 overs)		Yasoda Mendis 20 (19); Rumana Ahmed 3/9 (4 overs)

Sri Lanka won by 5 wickets
M. Chinnaswamy Stadium, Bengaluru
Umpires: Johan Cloete (SA) and Simon Fry (Aus)

- Sri Lanka won the toss and elected to field.

11 March
19:30 (D/N)
Scorecard

New Zealand; 130/6 (20 overs)	v	England; 131/6 (20 overs)
Sophie Devine 40 (42); Katherine Brunt 2/15 (4 overs)		Sarah Taylor 51 (52); Lea Tahuhu 2/10 (4 overs)

England won by 4 wickets
M. A. Chidambaram Stadium, Chennai
Umpires: Anil Chaudhary (Ind) and C. K. Nandan (Ind)

- England won the toss and elected to field.

12 March
15:00
Scorecard

England; 126 (19.2 overs)	v	New Zealand; 106 (19.1 overs)
Tamsin Beaumont 56 (52); Leigh Kasperek 4/12 (3.2 overs)		Sophie Devine 35 (33); Jenny Gunn 4/12 (2.1 overs)

England won by 20 runs
M. A. Chidambaram Stadium, Chennai
Umpires: Anil Chaudhary (Ind) and C. K. Nandan (Ind)

- England won the toss and elected to bat.

12 March
15:00
Scorecard

Ireland; 74/9 (20 overs)	v	Bangladesh; 79/2 (12.3 overs)
Laura Delany 17 (21); Rumana Ahmed 4/12 (4 overs)		Sharmin Akhter 36* (37); Ciara Metcalfe 1/12 (3 overs)

Bangladesh won by 8 wickets
M. Chinnaswamy Stadium, Bengaluru
Umpires: Simon Fry (Aus) and Joel Wilson (WI)

- Ireland won the toss and elected to bat.

12 March
19:30 (D/N)
Scorecard

South Africa; 104/5 (20 overs)	v	Tamil Nadu Cricket Association City Juniors; 108/1 (15.1 overs)
Marizanne Kapp 53* (55); Nidhish Rajagopal 2/7 (2 overs)		S Abhishek 50* (45); Suné Luus 1/13 (2 overs)

Tamil Nadu Cricket Association City Juniors won by 9 wickets
M. A. Chidambaram Stadium, Chennai
Umpires: Kathy Cross (NZ) and Claire Polosak (Aus)

- South Africa won the toss and elected to bat.

12 March
19:30 (D/N)
Scorecard

Sri Lanka; 125/4 (20 overs)	v	India; 128/2 (17.5 overs)
Dilani Manodara 43* (35); Deepti Sharma 2/4 (2 overs)		Smriti Mandhana 42* (28); Udeshika Prabodani 1/10 (4 overs)

India won by 8 wickets
M. Chinnaswamy Stadium, Bengaluru
Umpires: Johan Cloete (SA) and Ranmore Martinesz (SL)

- India won the toss and elected to field.

14 March
15:00
Scorecard

Australia; 139/3 (20 overs)	v	West Indies; 96 (19 overs)
Elyse Villani 51 (42); Stafanie Taylor 1/8 (2 overs)		Stacy-Ann King 19* (22); Kristen Beams 3/9 (3 overs)

Australia won by 43 runs
M. A. Chidambaram Stadium, Chennai
Umpires: Anil Chaudhary (Ind) and Kathy Cross (NZ)

- West Indies won the toss and elected to field.

14 March
19:30 (D/N)
Scorecard

South Africa; 101/7 (20 overs)	v	England; 102/3 (16.3 overs)
Trisha Chetty 31 (35); Anya Shrubsole 4/17 (4 overs)		Sarah Taylor 37 (36); Chloe Tryon 1/9 (1.3 overs)

England won by 7 wickets
M. A. Chidambaram Stadium, Chennai
Umpires: C. K. Nandan (Ind) and Claire Polosak (Aus)

- South Africa won the toss and elected to bat.

== Group stage ==
On 11 December 2015, International Cricket Council announced the schedule for the tournament with the 10 teams split into 2 groups. Each team played every other team in its group once. The top two teams from each group qualified to the knockout phase.

=== Group A ===
Pos	Team	Pld	W	L	T	NR	Pts	NRR
1	New Zealand	4	4	0	0	0	8	2.430
2	Australia	4	3	1	0	0	6	0.613
3	Sri Lanka	4	2	2	0	0	4	−0.240
4	South Africa	4	1	3	0	0	2	0.173
5	Ireland	4	0	4	0	0	0	−2.817

Source: ESPNCricinfo

Qualified to Knockout stage

15 March
19:30 (D/N)
Scorecard

Sri Lanka; 110/8 (20 overs)	v	New Zealand; 111/3 (15.5 overs)
Dilani Manodara 37 (31); Leigh Kasperek 2/19 (4 overs)		Suzie Bates 37 (37); Shashikala Siriwardene 1/21 (2 overs)

New Zealand won by 7 wickets
Feroz Shah Kotla Ground, Delhi
Umpires: Michael Gough (Eng) and Chettithody Shamshuddin (Ind)
Player of the match: Suzie Bates (NZ)

- Sri Lanka won the toss and elected to bat.

18 March
15:30 (D/N)
Scorecard

New Zealand; 177/3 (20 overs)	v	Ireland; 84/5 (20 overs)
Suzie Bates 82 (60); Amy Kenealy 1/20 (3 overs)		Isobel Joyce 28 (33); Erin Bermingham 2/17 (4 overs)

New Zealand won by 93 runs
Punjab Cricket Association IS Bindra Stadium, Mohali
Umpires: Vineet Kulkarni (Ind) and Claire Polosak (Aus)
Player of the match: Suzie Bates (NZ)

- New Zealand won the toss and elected to bat.
- Suzie Bates (NZ) scored her 2,000th T20I run.

18 March
19:30 (D/N)
Scorecard

South Africa; 102/6 (20 overs)	v	Australia; 105/4 (18.3 overs)
Dane van Niekerk 45 (47); Lauren Cheatle 2/13 (4 overs); Ellyse Perry 2/13 (4 overs)		Alex Blackwell 42* (46); Shabnim Ismail 2/15 (3 overs)

Australia won by 6 wickets
Vidarbha Cricket Association Stadium, Nagpur
Umpires: Kathy Cross (NZ) and C. K. Nandan (Ind)
Player of the match: Meg Lanning (Aus)

- South Africa won the toss and elected to bat.
- Dane van Niekerk (SA) scored her 1,000th T20I run.

20 March
19:30 (D/N)
Scorecard

Sri Lanka; 129/7 (20 overs)	v	Ireland; 115/8 (20 overs)
Eshani Lokusuriyage 35* (28); Ciara Metcalfe 4/15 (4 overs)		Laura Delany 29 (24); Sugandika Kumari 3/24 (4 overs)

Sri Lanka won by 14 runs
Punjab Cricket Association IS Bindra Stadium, Mohali
Umpires: Vineet Kulkarni (Ind) and Claire Polosak (Aus)
Player of the match: Ciara Metcalfe (Ire)

- Sri Lanka won the toss and elected to bat.
- Harshitha Madavi (SL) made her T20I debut.

21 March
15:30 (D/N)
Scorecard

Australia; 103/8 (20 overs)	v	New Zealand; 104/4 (16.2 overs)
Ellyse Perry 42 (48); Leigh Kasperek 3/13 (4 overs)		Rachel Priest 34 (27); Lauren Cheatle 1/11 (2 overs)

New Zealand won by 6 wickets
Vidarbha Cricket Association Stadium, Nagpur
Umpires: Ruchira Palliyaguruge (SL) and Chettithody Shamshuddin (Ind)
Player of the match: Leigh Kasperek (NZ)

- Australia won the toss and elected to bat.

23 March
19:30 (D/N)
Scorecard

South Africa; 156/5 (20 overs)	v	Ireland; 89/9 (20 overs)
Trisha Chetty 35 (35); Kim Garth 2/26 (4 overs)		Clare Shillington 34 (28); Suné Luus 5/8 (4 overs)

South Africa won by 67 runs
M. A. Chidambaram Stadium, Chennai
Umpires: Kathy Cross (NZ) and C. K. Nandan (Ind)
Player of the match: Suné Luus (SA)

- South Africa won the toss and elected to bat.
- Trisha Chetty (SA) scored her 1,000th T20I run.

24 March
15:30 (D/N)
Scorecard

Sri Lanka; 123/8 (20 overs)	v	Australia; 125/1 (17.4 overs)
Chamari Atapattu 38 (32); Kristen Beams 2/25 (4 overs); Megan Schutt 2/25 (4 overs)		Meg Lanning 56* (53); Inoka Ranaweera 1/27 (4 overs)

Australia won by 9 wickets
Feroz Shah Kotla Ground, Delhi
Umpires: Chris Gaffaney (NZ) and Michael Gough (Eng)
Player of the match: Elyse Villani (Aus)

- Sri Lanka won the toss and elected to bat.

26 March
15:30 (D/N)
Scorecard

Ireland; 91/7 (20 overs)	v	Australia; 92/3 (13.2 overs)
Kim Garth 27 (46); Megan Schutt 3/29 (4 overs)		Elyse Villani 43 (35); Kim Garth 2/24 (3 overs)

Australia won by 7 wickets
Feroz Shah Kotla Ground, Delhi
Umpires: Chris Gaffaney (NZ) and S. Ravi (Ind)
Player of the match: Megan Schutt (Aus)

- Australia won the toss and elected to field.

26 March
19:30 (D/N)
Scorecard

South Africa; 99 (19.3 overs)	v	New Zealand; 100/3 (14.3 overs)
Marizanne Kapp 22 (24); Sophie Devine 3/16 (3 overs)		Suzie Bates 29 (25); Masabata Klaas 1/11 (1 over)

New Zealand won by 7 wickets
M. Chinnaswamy Stadium, Bengaluru
Umpires: Simon Fry (Aus) and Ranmore Martinesz (SL)
Player of the match: Sophie Devine (NZ)

- New Zealand won the toss and elected to field.

28 March
15:30 (D/N)
Scorecard

Sri Lanka; 114/7 (20 overs)	v	South Africa; 104/7 (20 overs)
Chamari Atapattu 52 (49); Marizanne Kapp 2/17 (4 overs)		Trisha Chetty 26 (25); Udeshika Prabodani 2/13 (4 overs)

Sri Lanka won by 10 runs
M. Chinnaswamy Stadium, Bengaluru
Umpires: Simon Fry (Aus) and Joel Wilson (WI)
Player of the match: Chamari Atapattu (SL)

- Sri Lanka won the toss and elected to bat.

=== Group B ===
Pos	Team	Pld	W	L	T	NR	Pts	NRR
1	England	4	4	0	0	0	8	1.417
2	West Indies	4	3	1	0	0	6	0.688
3	Pakistan	4	2	2	0	0	4	−0.673
4	India	4	1	3	0	0	2	0.790
5	Bangladesh	4	0	4	0	0	0	−2.306

Source: ESPNCricinfo

Qualified to Knockout stage
Relegated to Qualifier

15 March
15:30 (D/N)
Scorecard

India; 163/5 (20 overs)	v	Bangladesh; 91/5 (20 overs)
Mithali Raj 42 (35); Fahima Khatun 2/31 (4 overs)		Nigar Sultana 27* (25); Anuja Patil 2/16 (4 overs)

India won by 72 runs
M. Chinnaswamy Stadium, Bengaluru
Umpires: Aleem Dar (Pak) and Ranmore Martinesz (SL)
Player of the match: Harmanpreet Kaur (Ind)

- Bangladesh won the toss and elected to field.

16 March
19:30 (D/N)
Scorecard

West Indies; 103/8 (20 overs)	v	Pakistan; 99/5 (20 overs)
Stafanie Taylor 40 (48); Anam Amin 4/16 (4 overs)		Bismah Maroof 22 (30); Anisa Mohammed 3/25 (4 overs)

West Indies won by 4 runs
M. A. Chidambaram Stadium, Chennai
Umpires: Anil Chaudhary (Ind) and Kathy Cross (NZ)
Player of the match: Anam Amin (Pak)

- Pakistan won the toss and elected to field.
- Muneeba Ali (Pak) made her T20I debut.
- Stafanie Taylor (WI) scored her 2,000th T20I run.
- Anisa Mohammed (WI) took her 100th T20I wicket, becoming the first player (male or female) to achieve this feat.

17 March
15:30 (D/N)
Scorecard

England; 153/7 (20 overs)	v	Bangladesh; 117/6 (20 overs)
Charlotte Edwards 60 (51); Jahanara Alam 3/32 (4 overs)		Nigar Sultana 35 (28); Anya Shrubsole 2/27 (4 overs)

England won by 36 runs
M. Chinnaswamy Stadium, Bengaluru
Umpires: Simon Fry (Aus) and Ranmore Martinesz (SL)
Player of the match: Charlotte Edwards (Eng)

- England won the toss and elected to bat.

19 March
15:30 (D/N)
Scorecard

India; 96/7 (20 overs)	v	Pakistan; 77/6 (16 overs)
Veda Krishnamurthy 24 (19); Anam Amin 1/9 (4 overs)		Sidra Ameen 26 (26); Harmanpreet Kaur 1/9 (2 overs)

Pakistan won by 2 runs (DLS)
Feroz Shah Kotla Ground, Delhi
Umpires: Michael Gough (Eng) and Ruchira Palliyaguruge (SL)
Player of the match: Anam Amin (Pak)

- Pakistan won the toss and elected to field.
- Rain stopped play at the 16th over of the Pakistan innings, who were 2 runs ahead of DLS par score. No further play was possible.

20 March
15:30 (D/N)
Scorecard

West Indies; 148/4 (20 overs)	v	Bangladesh; 99 (18.3 overs)
Hayley Matthews 41 (42); Nahida Akter 3/27 (4 overs)		Nigar Sultana 27 (27); Stafanie Taylor 3/13 (3 overs)

West Indies won by 49 runs
M. A. Chidambaram Stadium, Chennai
Umpires: Anil Chaudhary (Ind) and C. K. Nandan (Ind)
Player of the match: Stafanie Taylor (WI)

- West Indies won the toss and elected to bat.

22 March
15:30 (D/N)
Scorecard

India; 90/8 (20 overs)	v	England; 92/8 (19 overs)
Harmanpreet Kaur 26 (25); Heather Knight 3/15 (4 overs)		Tamsin Beaumont 20 (18); Ekta Bisht 4/21 (4 overs)

England won by 2 wickets
Himachal Pradesh Cricket Association Stadium, Dharamshala
Umpires: Ranmore Martinesz (SL) and Joel Wilson (WI)
Player of the match: Heather Knight (Eng)

- England won the toss and elected to field.

24 March
19:30 (D/N)
Scorecard

West Indies; 108/4 (20 overs)	v	England; 109/9 (20 overs)
Stafanie Taylor 35 (47); Anya Shrubsole 1/11 (4 overs)		Tamsin Beaumont 31 (23); Afy Fletcher 3/12 (4 overs)

England won by 1 wicket
Himachal Pradesh Cricket Association Stadium, Dharamshala
Umpires: Vineet Kulkarni (Ind) and Claire Polosak (Aus)
Player of the match: Tamsin Beaumont (Eng)

- West Indies won the toss and elected to bat.

24 March
19:30 (D/N)
Scorecard

Bangladesh; 113/9 (20 overs)	v	Pakistan; 114/1 (16.3 overs)
Farzana Hoque 36 (37); Anam Amin 2/12 (4 overs)		Sidra Ameen 53* (48); Salma Khatun 1/15 (2 overs)

Pakistan won by 9 wickets
Feroz Shah Kotla Ground, Delhi
Umpires: Ruchira Palliyaguruge (SL) and Chettithody Shamshuddin (Ind)
Player of the match: Sidra Ameen (Pak)

- Bangladesh won the toss and elected to bat.

27 March
15:30 (D/N)
Scorecard

West Indies; 114/8 (20 overs)	v	India; 111/9 (20 overs)
Stafanie Taylor 47 (45); Harmanpreet Kaur 4/23 (3 overs)		Anuja Patil 26 (27); Deandra Dottin 3/16 (4 overs)

West Indies won by 3 runs
Punjab Cricket Association IS Bindra Stadium, Mohali
Umpires: Richard Illingworth (Eng) and Nigel Llong (Eng)
Player of the match: Deandra Dottin (WI)

- India won the toss and elected to field.

27 March
19:30 (D/N)
Scorecard

England; 148/5 (20 overs)	v	Pakistan; 80 (17.5 overs)
Charlotte Edwards 77* (61); Nida Dar 3/21 (4 overs)		Nida Dar 16 (22); Laura Marsh 3/12 (4 overs)

England won by 68 runs
M. A. Chidambaram Stadium, Chennai
Umpires: Anil Chaudhary (Ind) and Kathy Cross (NZ)
Player of the match: Charlotte Edwards (Eng)

- England won the toss and elected to bat.
- Charlotte Edwards scored her 2,500th T20I run, becoming the first player (male or female) to achieve this feat.

== Knockout stage ==
Semifinals
A2	Australia	132/6 (20 ov)
B1	England	127/7 (20 ov)
A1	New Zealand	137/8 (20 ov)
B2	West Indies	143/6 (20 ov)

Final
A2	Australia	148/5 (20 ov)
B2	West Indies	149/2 (19.3 ov)

=== Semi-finals ===
30 March
14:30
Scorecard

Australia; 132/6 (20 overs)	v	England; 127/7 (20 overs)
Meg Lanning 55 (50); Nat Sciver 2/22 (3 overs)		Tamsin Beaumont 32 (40); Megan Schutt 2/15 (4 overs)

Australia won by 5 runs
Feroz Shah Kotla Ground, Delhi
Umpires: Chris Gaffaney (NZ) and Sundaram Ravi (Ind)
Player of the match: Meg Lanning (Aus)

- England won the toss and elected to field.

31 March
14:30
Scorecard

West Indies; 143/6 (20 overs)	v	New Zealand; 137/8 (20 overs)
Britney Cooper 61 (48); Sophie Devine 4/22 (4 overs)		Sara McGlashan 38 (30); Stafanie Taylor 3/26 (4 overs)

West Indies won by 6 runs
Wankhede Stadium, Mumbai
Umpires: Richard Illingworth (Eng) and Nigel Llong (Eng)
Player of the match: Britney Cooper (WI)

- New Zealand won the toss and elected to field.

=== Final ===
Australia were appearing in the World Twenty20 final for a fourth consecutive time (and hoping to claim a fourth consecutive title), whereas the West Indies had only made it as far as the semi-finals in previous tournaments. Both teams had finished second in their groups (to New Zealand and England, respectively), but Australia went into the final as favourites. Australian captain Meg Lanning won the toss and elected to bat, with Australia posting what was regarded as a highly competitive total of 148/5 from their 20 overs. Lanning and Elyse Villani both scored half-centuries, while Ellyse Perry hit two sixes in a quickfire innings of 28 towards the end of the innings.

In response, the West Indian openers Hayley Matthews (66 from 45 balls) and Stafanie Taylor (59 from 57 balls) put on a partnership of 120 runs for the first wicket, setting a new team record for Twenty20 Internationals. Matthews and Taylor were both dismissed within the final five overs, but Deandra Dottin and Britney Cooper combined to carry the West Indies to victory with three balls remaining. Matthews, who turned 18 during the tournament, was named Player of the Match. By winning the tournament, the West Indies became only the fourth team to win a global women's cricket tournament, after Australia, England, and New Zealand. In all World Twenty20 matches, only one higher successful chase has been carried out.

3 April
14:30
Scorecard

Australia; 148/5 (20 overs)	v	West Indies; 149/2 (19.3 overs)
Elyse Villani 52 (37); Deandra Dottin 2/33 (4 overs)		Hayley Matthews 66 (45); Kristen Beams 1/27 (4 overs)

West Indies won by 8 wickets
Eden Gardens, Kolkata
Umpires: Aleem Dar (Pak) and Richard Illingworth (Eng)
Player of the match: Hayley Matthews (WI)

- Australia won the toss and elected to bat.
- West Indies became the first team to win both the men's and women's World Twenty20s on the same day.

== Statistics ==
=== Most runs ===
Player	Team	Mat	Inns	Runs	Ave	SR	HS	100	50	4s	6s
Stafanie Taylor	West Indies	6	6	246	41.00	93.18	59	0	1	21	1
Charlotte Edwards	England	5	5	202	50.50	114.77	77*	0	2	26	0
Meg Lanning	Australia	6	6	201	50.25	111.66	56*	0	3	28	0
Suzie Bates	New Zealand	5	5	183	36.60	111.58	82	0	1	18	3
Elyse Villani	Australia	6	6	171	34.20	117.12	53*	0	2	28	0
Source: ESPNcricinfo

=== Most wickets ===
Player	Team	Mat	Inns	Wkts	Ave	Econ	BBI	SR	4WI	5WI
Leigh Kasperek	New Zealand	5	5	9	10.11	4.91	3/13	12.3	0	0
Sophie Devine	New Zealand	5	5	9	10.55	5.58	4/22	11.3	1	0
Deandra Dottin	West Indies	6	6	9	13.55	6.42	3/16	12.6	0	0
Stafanie Taylor	West Indies	6	6	8	15.25	6.42	3/13	14.2	0	0
Suné Luus	South Africa	4	4	7	6.71	4.70	5/8	8.5	0	1
Source: ESPNcricinfo

=== ICC team of the tournament ===
On 4 April 2016, ICC announced the team of the tournament. The selection panel consisted of Geoff Allardice, Ian Bishop, Nasser Hussain, Mel Jones, Sanjay Manjrekar and Lisa Sthalekar.

- (New Zealand) Suzie Bates
- (England) Charlotte Edwards
- (Australia) Meg Lanning
- (Cricket West Indies) Stafanie Taylor (c)
- (New Zealand) Sophie Devine
- (New Zealand) Rachel Priest (wk)
- (Cricket West Indies) Deandra Dottin
- (Australia) Megan Schutt
- (South Africa) Sune Luus
- (New Zealand) Leigh Kasperek
- (England) Anya Shrubsole
- (Pakistan) Anam Amin (12th woman)
