= Li Yingying =

Li Yingying is the name of:

- Li Yingying (cricketer) (born c.1991), Chinese cricketer
- Li Yingying (volleyball) (born 2000), Chinese volleyball player

== See also ==
- Lee Ying Ying (born 1997), Malaysian badminton player
