= Women's T20 World Cup Global Qualifier =

International cricket competition

ICC Women's T20 World Cup Global Qualifier
- Tournament logo
- Administrator: International Cricket Council
- Format: Women's Twenty20 International; Women's Twenty20 (2013–2015)
- First edition: 2013: Ireland
- Latest edition: 2026: Nepal
- Next edition: 2028: TBA
- Tournament format: see below
- Number of teams: 10
- Current champion: Bangladesh (4th title)
- Most successful: Bangladesh (4 titles)
- Most runs: (Scotland) Kathryn Bryce (783)
- Most wickets: (Scotland) Abtaha Maqsood (24)

The ICC Women's T20 World Cup Global Qualifier, formerly the ICC Women's World Twenty20 Qualifier (2013–2018) and the ICC Women's T20 World Cup Qualifier (2019–2022), is a biennial international cricket competition in Women's Twenty20 International (WT20I) format (formerly in a hybrid Women's Twenty20 format until 2015), organised by the International Cricket Council (ICC). It was held in every odd year from 2013 to 2019 with the exception of 2017 which was held in 2018, and since 2022 it has been held in every even year. It serves as the final stage of the qualification process for the ICC Women's T20 World Cup, formerly the ICC Women's World Twenty20 (2009–2018).

As of 2026, seven editions have been played; a total of 18 teams have competed and four teams have won the tournament. Bangladesh (2018, 2019, 2022, 2026) are the most successful team with four titles. Sri Lanka (2013, 2024) have won it twice, while Pakistan (2013) and Ireland (2015) have one title each. A total of six countries have hosted the tournament. Bangladesh are the current champions, having won their fourth title in the 2026 edition. The next edition of the tournament will take place in 2028.

== History ==
=== Background ===
In 2003, the England and Wales Cricket Board (ECB) introduced a 20-over per innings game to the county cricket. The first official Twenty20 matches were played on 13 June 2003 between the English counties in the T20 Blast's inaugural edition. The first official Women's Twenty20 matches were played on 29 May 2004 as part of the 2004 Super Fours. The first Twenty20 match held at Lord's, on 15 July 2004 between Middlesex and Surrey, attracted a crowd of 26,500, the largest attendance for any county cricket game at the ground since 1953. The first full international women's Twenty20 match was played on 5 August 2004 between England and New Zealand at County Cricket Ground in Hove. The first full international men's Twenty20 match was played on 17 February 2005 between Australia and New Zealand at Eden Park in Auckland. The game was played in a light-hearted manner.

Soon after, the International Cricket Council (ICC) adapted the T20I format and introduced the ICC Men's T20 World Cup (then known as the ICC World Twenty20) in 2007, followed by the ICC Women's T20 World Cup (then known as the ICC Women's World Twenty20) in 2009. In December 2007, A separate qualifier event (later renamed as "Global Qualifier") for the men's tournament was announced and was introduced from the 2009 edition onwards. In 2012, an expanded qualification pathway including a series of regional qualifiers was introduced for the men's tournament. In 2013, both global and regional qualifiers were introduced as parts of the women's qualification pathway as well.

=== Initial years (2013–2018) ===
The inaugural qualifier was held in July 2013 in Ireland featuring 8 teams with the top 3 teams qualifying for the 2014 World Twenty20. However, the final match of the qualifier was abandoned due to rain and the title was shared between Pakistan and Sri Lanka. The second tournament was held in November and December 2015 in Thailand featuring 8 teams with only the top 2 teams qualifying for the 2016 World Twenty20. The third tournament was held in July 2018 in the Netherlands featuring 8 teams with the top 2 qualifying for the 2018 World Twenty20.

=== Disruptions and rebranding (2019–2022) ===
In November 2018, as part of a goal to heighten the profile of the World Twenty20 tournaments, the ICC announced that they would be rebranded as the "T20 World Cup" beginning in 2020. The third qualifier tournament was held in August – September 2019 in Scotland featuring 8 teams with the top 2 qualifying for the 2020 T20 World Cup. The fifth qualifier tournament was held in September 2022 in the United Arab Emirates featuring 8 teams with the top 2 qualifying for the 2023 T20 World Cup.

=== Expansion to 10 teams (2024–present) ===
The sixth qualifier (now named the "Global Qualifier") was held in April – May 2024 in the United Arab Emirates, featuring 10 teams, with the top 2 teams qualifying for the 2024 T20 World Cup. The seventh Global Qualifier was held in January – February 2026 in Nepal, featuring 10 teams, with the top 4 teams qualifying for the 2026 T20 World Cup.

== Hosts ==
Summary of hosts by ICC region (2013–2026) (Note: References for tournament hosts: 2013, 2015, 2018, 2019, 2022, 2024, 2026)
Region	Year	Hosting body	Host(s)
Asia	2015	Cricket Association of Thailand	Thailand
Asia	2022	Emirates Cricket Board	United Arab Emirates
Asia	2024	Emirates Cricket Board	United Arab Emirates
Asia	2026	Cricket Association of Nepal	Nepal
Europe	2013	Cricket Ireland	Ireland
Europe	2018	Royal Dutch Cricket Association	Netherlands
Europe	2019	Cricket Scotland	Scotland

Host countries of Women's T20 World Cup Global Qualifier

== Format ==
=== Qualification ===
Until 2019, one host team and the bottom two teams from the previous World Twenty20 qualified directly, while the remaining 5 spots were filled by teams that advanced from the regional qualifiers. In 2022, the bottom two teams from the previous T20 World Cup qualified directly, while the remaining 6 spots were filled by teams that advanced from the regional qualifiers. Since 2024, the bottom two teams from the previous T20 World Cup receive direct qualification, while the remaining 8 spots are filled by teams that advance from the regional qualifiers. (Note: References for qualification formats: 2013, 2015, 2018, 2019, 2022, 2024, 2026)

Summary of the qualification for Global Qualifier (2013–2026)
#	Year	Teams	Directly qualified		Regional qualifiers				
#	Year	Teams	Hosts	Previous tournament	Africa	Americas	Asia	East Asia-Pacific	Europe
1	2013	8	1	2	1	1	1	1	1
2	2015	8	1	2	1	—N/a	1	1	2
3	2018	8	1	2	1	—N/a	2	1	1
4	2019	8	1	2	1	1	1	1	1
5	2022	8	—N/a	1	1	1	1	1	2
6	2024	10	—N/a	2	2	1	2	1	2
7	2026	10	—N/a	2	2	1	2	1	2

=== Tournament ===
The tournament is primarily held in two stages. The preliminary stage, or group stage, features 2 groups of 4 (2013–2022) or 5 (since 2024) teams in a round-robin format. Until 2022, the second stage had two sub-stages: shield stage and final stage. The top 4 teams from the preliminary stage advanced to the final stage, a knockout stage, while the bottom 4 played the shield stage, a repechage stage with consolation playoffs. In 2024, the shield stage was discontinued. In 2026, the second stage was changed into the Super stage, a round-robin stage of 6 teams known as the Super 6 stage. (Note: References for tournament formats: 2013, 2015, 2018, 2019, 2022, 2024, 2026)

In case of a tie (that is, both teams scoring the same number of runs at the end of their respective innings), a Super Over is used to decide the winner since 2009. In the case of a tie occurring again in the Super Over, subsequent Super Overs would be played until there is a winner. Prior to 2019, the match would be won by the team that had scored the most boundaries in their innings. Until 2015, the tournament was played in a hybrid format: only the matches involving a full member country or an associate team with T20I status had international status and were considered as WT20I matches, while other matches were played as WT20 matches without international status. In April 2018, the ICC announced that all member teams would be awarded full WT20I status from July 2018 onwards and since then, the tournament is played with full WT20I status.

Summary of tournament formats (2013–2026)
#	Year	Teams	Matches	Preliminary stage	Super stage	Shield stage	Final stage
1	2013	8	20	2 groups of 4 teams: 12 matches	—N/a	Repechage of 4 teams: 4 matches	Knockout of 4 teams: 4 matches
2	2015	8	20	2 groups of 4 teams: 12 matches	—N/a	Repechage of 4 teams: 4 matches	Knockout of 4 teams: 4 matches
3	2018	8	20	2 groups of 4 teams: 12 matches	—N/a	Repechage of 4 teams: 4 matches	Knockout of 4 teams: 4 matches
4	2019	8	20	2 groups of 4 teams: 12 matches	—N/a	Repechage of 4 teams: 4 matches	Knockout of 4 teams: 4 matches
5	2022	8	20	2 groups of 4 teams: 12 matches	—N/a	Repechage of 4 teams: 4 matches	Knockout of 4 teams: 4 matches
6	2024	10	23	2 groups of 5 teams: 20 matches	—N/a	—N/a	Knockout of 4 teams: 3 matches
7	2026	10	29	2 groups of 5 teams: 20 matches	Super 6 stage 6 teams with PCF: 9 matches	—N/a	—N/a

== Summary ==
Details of Women's T20 World Cup Global Qualifier tournaments
#	Year	Dates	Host(s)	Venues	Ref.
1	2013	23 July – 1 August 2013	Cricket Ireland	4 in Ireland	
2	2015	28 November – 5 December 2015	Cricket Association of Thailand	2 in Thailand	
3	2018	7 – 14 July 2018	Royal Dutch Cricket Association	2 in the Netherlands	
4	2019	31 August – 7 September 2019	Cricket Scotland	2 in Scotland	
5	2022	18 – 25 September 2022	Emirates Cricket Board	2 in the United Arab Emirates	
6	2024	25 April – 7 May 2024	Emirates Cricket Board	2 in the United Arab Emirates	
7	2026	18 January – 1 February 2026	Cricket Association of Nepal	2 in Nepal	
8	2028	TBA	TBA	TBA	

=== Final results ===
Details of Women's T20 World Cup Global Qualifier finals
Year	Final				Ref.
Year	Date & venue	Winner	Victory margin	Runner-up	Ref.
2013	31 July 2013; Claremont Road Cricket Ground, Dublin	Pakistan; Sri Lanka	No result	—N/a	
2015	5 December 2015; Terdthai Cricket Ground, Bangkok	Ireland; 106/8 (20 overs)	2 wickets	Bangladesh; 105/3 (20 overs)	
2018	14 July 2018; Kampong Cricket Club, Utrecht	Bangladesh; 122/9 (20 overs)	25 runs	Ireland; 95 (18.4 overs)	
2019	7 September 2019; Forthill, Dundee	Bangladesh; 130/5 (20 overs)	70 runs	Thailand; 60/7 (20 overs)	
2022	25 September 2022; Sheikh Zayed Cricket Stadium, Abu Dhabi	Bangladesh; 120/8 (20 overs)	7 runs	Ireland; 113/9 (20 overs)	
2024	7 May 2024; Sheikh Zayed Cricket Stadium, Abu Dhabi	Sri Lanka; 169/5 (20 overs)	68 runs	Scotland; 101/7 (20 overs)	
2026	No final	Bangladesh; 10 points (NRR: 1.886)	based on points	Ireland; 6 points (NRR: 1.280)	

== Team performances ==
As of the 2026 tournament, eighteen teams have played in the Global Qualifier, but only two teams (Ireland and Thailand) have competed in every tournament. Four teams have won the tournament; Bangladesh (2018, 2019, 2022, 2026) have won the tournament four times, Sri Lanka (2013, 2024) have won it twice, Pakistan (2013) and Ireland (2015) have won it once each. Bangladesh have made five final appearances, while Ireland have made seven semi-final appearances. The best performance by a host team is semi-finalists by Ireland in 2013 and the United Arab Emirates in 2024. Sri Lanka and Pakistan have the highest victory percentage in Global Qualifier matches (100%).

=== By tournament ===
An overview of the teams' performances in every Global Qualifier is given below.

Legend

- W Winners
- RU Runners-up
- SF Semi-finalist (2024)
- 3rd 3rd place (2013–2022; 2026)
- 4th 4th place (2013–2022; 2026)
- R2 Super stage (2026)
- R1 Preliminary round (group stage)
- Q Qualified
- × Withdrew
- ×× Ineligible (suspended)
- * Hosts
- ↑ Advanced to the respective ICC Women's T20 World Cup
- § Directly qualified for the respective ICC Women's T20 World Cup

† denotes current Test playing nations / ICC full members.

Team performances in each Women's T20 World Cup Global Qualifier tournament
Edition (No. of teams)	2013 (8)	2015 (8)	2018 (8)	2019 (8)	2022 (8)	2024 (10)	2026 (10)	Apps
Location(s) Team	(Ireland)	(Thailand)	(Netherlands)	(Scotland)	(United Arab Emirates)	(United Arab Emirates)	(Nepal)	Apps
Bangladesh†	§	RU↑	W↑	W↑	W↑	§	W↑	5
Canada	R1	—N/a	—N/a	—N/a	—N/a	—N/a	—N/a	1
China	—N/a	R1	—N/a	—N/a	—N/a	—N/a	—N/a	1
Ireland† (Note: Ireland became a full member in June 2017.)	3rd*↑	W↑	RU↑	3rd	RU↑	SF	RU↑	7
Japan	R1	—N/a	—N/a	—N/a	—N/a	—N/a	—N/a	1
Namibia	—N/a	—N/a	—N/a	R1	—N/a	—N/a	R1	2
Nepal	—N/a	—N/a	—N/a	—N/a	—N/a	—N/a	R1*	1
Netherlands	4th	R1	R1*	R1	—N/a	R1	4th↑	6
Pakistan†	W↑	§	§	§	§	§	§	1
Papua New Guinea	—N/a	R1	4th	4th	R1	—N/a	R1	5
Scotland	—N/a	4th	3rd	R1*	R1	RU↑	3rd↑	6
Sri Lanka†	W↑	§	§	§	§	W↑	§	2
Thailand	R1	R1*	R1	RU↑	R1	R1	R2	7
Uganda	—N/a	—N/a	R1	—N/a	—N/a	R1	—N/a	2
United Arab Emirates	—N/a	—N/a	R1	—N/a	R1*	SF*	—N/a	3
United States	—N/a	—N/a	—N/a	R1	R1	R1	R2	4
Vanuatu	—N/a	—N/a	—N/a	—N/a	—N/a	R1	—N/a	1
Zimbabwe† (Note: Zimbabwe was suspended from July to October 2019 by the ICC due to government interference.)	R1	3rd	—N/a	××	3rd	R1	R1	5
Ref.								

=== Overall ===
The table below provides a summary of the performances of teams over past Global Qualifiers.

† denotes current Test playing nations / ICC full members.

Overall team performances in Women's T20 World Cup Global Qualifier tournaments
Team (Note: Teams are ordered by their best performance, then winning percentage, then (if equal) by alphabetical order.)	Apps	Mat	Won	Lost	Tied (W/L)	N/R	Win % (Note: Excluding no result matches)	Best performance
Bangladesh†	5	27	26	1	0 (0/0)	0	96.29	Winners (2018, 2019, 2022, 2026)
Sri Lanka†	2	11	10	0	0 (0/0)	1	100.00	Winners (2013, 2024)
Pakistan†	1	5	4	0	0 (0/0)	1	100.00	Winners (2013)
Ireland†	7	37	27	10	0 (0/0)	0	72.97	Winners (2015)
Scotland	6	33	19	14	0 (0/0)	0	57.57	Runners-up (2024)
Thailand	7	36	16	20	0 (0/0)	0	44.44	Runners-up (2019)
Papua New Guinea	5	24	11	13	0 (0/0)	0	45.83	Semi-finals (2018, 2019)
Zimbabwe†	5	23	9	14	0 (0/0)	0	39.13	Semi-finals (2015, 2022)
Netherlands	6	31	10	20	1 (0/1)	0	32.25	Semi-finals (2013, 2026)
United Arab Emirates	3	15	5	9	1 (1/0)	0	40.00	Semi-finals (2024)
United States	4	21	4	17	0 (0/0)	0	19.04	Second round (2026)
Uganda	2	9	3	6	0 (0/0)	0	33.33	First round (2018, 2024)
Namibia	2	9	0	9	0 (0/0)	0	0.00	First round (2019, 2026)
China	1	5	2	3	0 (0/0)	0	40.00	First round (2015)
Canada	1	4	1	3	0 (0/0)	0	25.00	First round (2013)
Nepal	1	4	1	3	0 (0/0)	0	25.00	First round (2026)
Vanuatu	1	4	1	3	0 (0/0)	0	25.00	First round (2024)
Japan	1	4	0	4	0 (0/0)	0	0.00	First round (2013)
As of 2026 Women's T20 World Cup Global Qualifier Source: Cricinfo

=== Debutant teams by tournament ===
† denotes Test playing nations / ICC full members at that time.

Debutant teams in each Women's T20 World Cup Global Qualifier tournament
Year	Debutant teams				Total
2013	Canada	Ireland	Japan	Netherlands	8
2013	Pakistan†	Sri Lanka†	Thailand	Zimbabwe	8
2015	Bangladesh†	China	Papua New Guinea	Scotland	4
2018	Uganda		United Arab Emirates		2
2019	Namibia		United States		2
2022	—N/a				0
2024	Vanuatu				1
2026	Nepal				1
Total					18

== Records ==
As of the 2026 tournament, Naruemol Chaiwai of Thailand holds the record for most appearances in Global Qualifier matches (36), while Kathryn Bryce of Scotland holds the record for the most Global Qualifier matches as a captain (27). Sheikh Zayed Cricket Stadium in Abu Dhabi, United Arab Emirates, has hosted the most Global Qualifier matches (23). English umpire Sue Redfern has umpired the most Global Qualifier matches (26). A total of two centuries and thirteen 100-run partnerships have been scored while, 4 five-wicket hauls and 35 four-wicket hauls have been taken in the tournaments. Kathryn Bryce also holds the record for most runs (783), and Gaby Lewis of Ireland holds the record for most runs in a tournament (276 in 2026). Abtaha Maqsood of Scotland holds the record for most wickets (38), and Tara Norris of the United States holds the record for most wickets in a tournament (15 in 2026). Sarah Bryce of Scotland holds the record for most dismissals by a wicket-keeper (33) and Sterre Kalis of the Netherlands holds the record for most catches by a fielder (15).

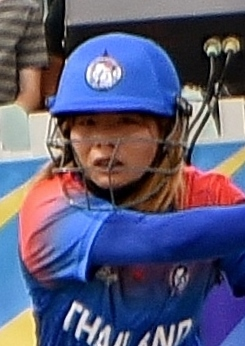
Naruemol Chaiwai of Thailand has appeared in the most Global Qualifier matches (36).

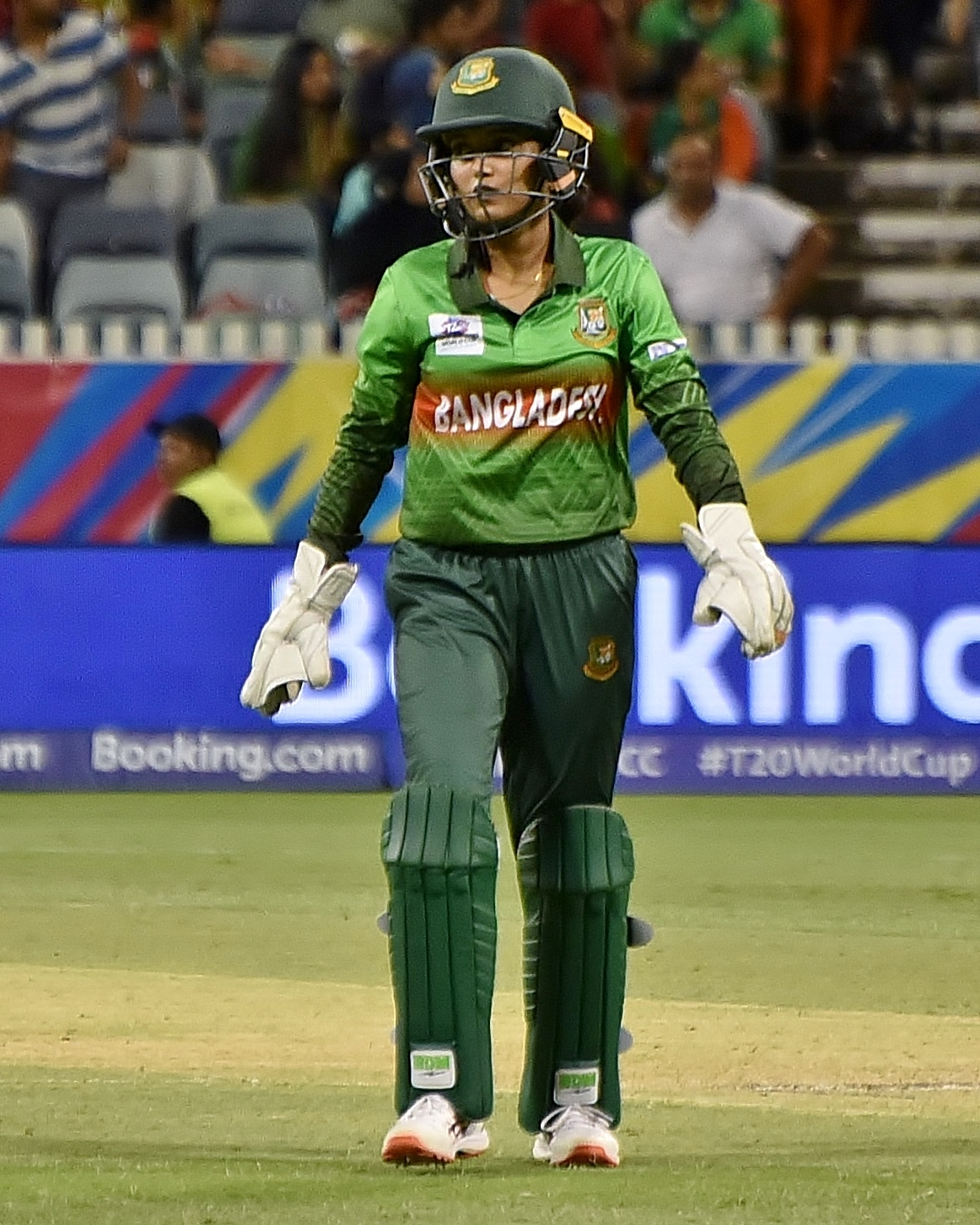
Nigar Sultana of Bangladesh has taken the most wicket-keeper dismissals in a Global Qualifier tournament (12 in 2015).

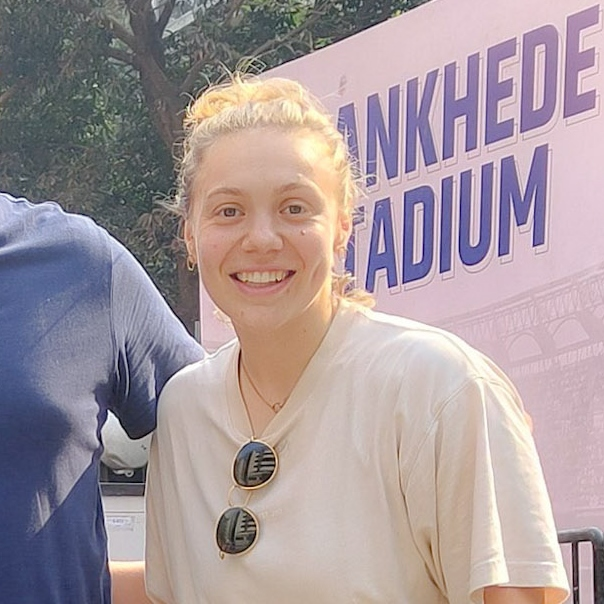
Tara Norris of the United States has taken the most wickets in a Global Qualifier tournament (15 in 2026).

=== Overall records ===
Team records
Record for	Record holder	Record	Tournament(s)	Ref.
Highest team total	Bangladesh (v Scotland) at Kirtipur	191/5	2026	
Lowest team total	Japan (v Sri Lanka) at Dublin	21/10	2013	
Highest match aggregate	Papua New Guinea v Scotland at Abu Dhabi	337/8	2022	
Lowest match aggregate	Japan v Sri Lanka at Dublin	43/10	2013	

Batting records
Record for	Record holder	Record	Tournament(s)	Ref.
Most runs	(Scotland) Kathryn Bryce	783	2015 – 2026	
Most runs in a tournament	(Ireland) Gaby Lewis	276	2026	
Highest score	(Ireland) Clare Shillington (v Japan) at Dublin	114*	2013	
Most centuries	2 players	1	2013 – 2024	
Highest partnership	(Bangladesh) Nigar Sultana & Murshida Khatun (v United States) at Abu Dhabi	138*	2022	

Bowling records
Record for	Record holder	Record	Tournament(s)	Ref.
Most wickets	(Scotland) Abtaha Maqsood	24	2015 – 2026	
Most wickets in a tournament	(United States) Tara Norris	15	2026	
Best bowling figures	(Bangladesh) Khadija Tul Kubra (v Papua New Guinea) at Bangkok	5/11	2015	
Most four-wicket hauls	(Scotland) Kathryn Bryce	3	2024 – 2026	
Most five-wicket hauls	4 players	1	2015 – 2026	

Fielding records
Record for	Record holder	Record	Tournament(s)	Ref.
Most wicket-keeper dismissals	(Scotland) Sarah Bryce	33	2015 – 2026	
Most wicket-keeper dismissals in a tournament	(Bangladesh) Nigar Sultana	12	2015	
Most catches	(Netherlands) Sterre Kalis	15	2015 – 2026	
Most catches in a tournament	(Ireland) Orla Prendergast (United States) Chetna Pagydyala	7	2026	

=== Tournament records ===
Records by tournament
Edition	Most runs	Most wickets	Ref.
2013	(Ireland) Clare Shillington (207)	(Sri Lanka) Chandima Gunaratne (9)	
2015	(Ireland) Cecelia Joyce (152)	(Bangladesh) Rumana Ahmed (14)	
2018	(Netherlands) Sterre Kalis (231)	(Ireland) Lucy O'Reilly (11)	
2019	(Scotland) Kathryn Bryce (168)	(Thailand) Chanida Sutthiruang (12)	
2022	(Papua New Guinea) Tanya Ruma (198)	(Zimbabwe) Kelis Ndhlovu (11)	
2024	(Sri Lanka) Chamari Athapaththu (226)	(Scotland) Rachel Slater (11)	
2026	(Ireland) Gaby Lewis (276)	(United States) Tara Norris (15)	

== See also ==
- Men's T20 World Cup
- Men's T20 World Cup qualification
- Men's T20 World Cup regional qualification
- Men's T20 World Cup Global Qualifier
