= Athletics at the 2011 Summer Universiade – Women's 200 metres =

The women's 200 metres event at the 2011 Summer Universiade was held on 18–19 August.

== Medalists ==
Gold	Silver	Bronze
Anneisha McLaughlin; Jamaica	Tiffany Townsend; United States	Anna Kaygorodova; Russia

== Results ==
=== Heats ===
Qualification: First 3 in each heat (Q) and the next 8 fastest (q) qualified for the quarterfinals.

Wind:
Heat 1: -0.4 m/s, Heat 2: -0.1 m/s, Heat 3: -1.0 m/s, Heat 4: 0.0 m/s, Heat 5: +1.1 m/s, Heat 6: +0.3 m/s, Heat 7: +1.5 m/s, Heat 8: -0.9 m/s

Rank	Heat	Name	Nationality	Time	Notes
1	8	Sonia Tavares	Portugal	23.75	Q
2	1	Anneisha McLaughlin	Jamaica	23.79	Q
3	1	Anna Kaygorodova	Russia	23.86	Q
4	7	Emily Diamond	Great Britain	23.86	Q
5	5	Aareon Payne	United States	23.94	Q
6	4	Tiffany Townsend	United States	23.96	Q
7	6	Yelizaveta Bryzhina	Ukraine	24.00	Q
8	5	Amy Foster	Ireland	24.08	Q
9	7	Kimberly Hyacinthe	Canada	24.15	Q
9	8	Anastasia Le-Roy	Jamaica	24.15	Q
11	3	Margaret Adeoye	Great Britain	24.20	Q
12	3	Nina Argunova	Russia	24.21	Q
13	4	Maryam Tousi	Iran	24.26	Q
14	2	Olga Bludova	Kazakhstan	24.28	Q
15	7	Zhang Chan	China	24.32	Q
16	8	Stacey Gardiner	South Africa	24.34	Q
17	1	Sonja van der Merwe	South Africa	24.35	Q
17	8	Gretta Taslakian	Lebanon	24.35	q
19	4	Marie Josée Ta Lou	Ivory Coast	24.35	Q, SB
20	5	Shakera Reece	Barbados	24.37	Q
21	2	Jiang Shan	China	24.51	Q
21	5	Silva Pesackaitė	Lithuania	24.51	q, SB
23	2	Lydia Mashila	Botswana	24.55	Q
24	3	Meliz Redif	Turkey	24.59	Q
25	3	Fanny Appes Ekanga	Cameroon	24.62	q, PB
26	7	Liona Rebernik	Slovenia	24.65	q
27	7	Anna Olsson	Denmark	24.68	q
28	5	Sunayna Wahi	Suriname	24.69	q
29	4	Lorène Bazolo	Republic of the Congo	24.73	q, SB
30	6	Andreea Ograzeanu	Romania	24.86	Q
31	4	Silvestra Malinauskaitė	Lithuania	24.87	q
31	6	Léa Sprunger	Switzerland	24.87	Q
33	1	Siri Eritsland	Norway	24.97	
33	5	Dipna Lim Prasad	Singapore	24.97	SB
35	8	Nurul Sarah Abdul Kadir	Malaysia	24.98	SB
36	3	Andrea Koenen	New Zealand	25.17	
37	1	Norjannah Hafiszah Jamaldin	Malaysia	25.19	
38	2	Nika Barundic	Slovenia	25.31	
39	4	Violeta Metodieva	Bulgaria	25.32	
39	7	Kang Daseul	South Korea	25.32	
41	6	Marlēna Reimane	Latvia	25.40	
42	2	Enirahs Martina	Netherlands Antilles	25.41	
43	3	Fatoumata Diop	Senegal	25.42	PB
44	3	Chan Hoyee	Hong Kong	25.48	
45	8	Valerie Pereira	Singapore	25.49	
46	6	Arviena Vis	Netherlands Antilles	25.74	
47	1	Lidiya Shakhvorostova	Uzbekistan	25.84	
48	6	Randi Kjerstad	Norway	25.88	
49	7	Marietou Badji	Senegal	26.38	
50	3	Asana Abubakari	Ghana	26.87	
51	5	Mwiya Muyatwa	Zambia	26.90	
52	2	Silvana Zuñiga	Peru	27.06	
53	4	Alice Ikabongo Ikabongo	Zambia	27.09	
54	8	Ana Burda	Albania	27.60	
55	1	Carolyne Waithra Njeri	Kenya	27.85	
	6	Wendy Reynoso	Dominican Republic	DQ	Lane Infr.
	1	Beaulah Mufambisi	Zimbabwe	DNS	
	2	Erika Chávez	Ecuador	DNS	
	2	Anne Dolvik	Norway	DNS	
	4	Rosângela Santos	Brazil	DNS	
	5	Nguyen Thi Hang	Vietnam	DNS	
	6	Demalathiw Priyadarshani	Sri Lanka	DNS	
	7	Aziza Sbaity	Lebanon	DNS	

=== Quarterfinals ===
Qualification: First 3 in each heat (Q) and the next 4 fastest (q) qualified for the semifinals.

Wind:
Heat 1: 0.0 m/s, Heat 2: -0.1 m/s, Heat 3: +0.6 m/s, Heat 4: +0.6 m/s

Rank	Heat	Name	Nationality	Time	Notes
1	4	Anna Kaygorodova	Russia	23.45	Q, PB
2	1	Anneisha McLaughlin	Jamaica	23.45	Q
3	3	Yelizaveta Bryzhina	Ukraine	23.53	Q
3	1	Amy Foster	Ireland	23.53	Q, PB
5	3	Anastasia Le-Roy	Jamaica	23.56	Q
6	3	Nina Argunova	Russia	23.63	Q
7	4	Sonia Tavares	Portugal	23.68	Q
8	2	Kimberly Hyacinthe	Canada	23.71	Q
9	2	Tiffany Townsend	United States	23.72	Q
10	2	Emily Diamond	Great Britain	23.78	Q
11	3	Aareon Payne	United States	23.89	q
12	1	Margaret Adeoye	Great Britain	23.94	Q
13	3	Shakera Reece	Barbados	23.97	q
14	2	Maryam Tousi	Iran	24.00	q
15	2	Sonja van der Merwe	South Africa	24.00	q
16	4	Gretta Taslakian	Lebanon	24.04	Q
17	1	Stacey Gardiner	South Africa	24.13	PB
18	3	Marie Josée Ta Lou	Ivory Coast	24.17	
18	4	Léa Sprunger	Switzerland	24.17	SB
20	4	Zhang Chan	China	24.19	
21	1	Meliz Redif	Turkey	24.29	
22	4	Olga Bludova	Kazakhstan	24.32	
23	1	Jiang Shan	China	24.36	
24	1	Lorène Bazolo	Republic of the Congo	24.47	NR
25	2	Fanny Appes Ekanga	Cameroon	24.72	
26	3	Liona Rebernik	Slovenia	24.75	
27	2	Lydia Mashila	Botswana	24.77	
28	3	Anna Olsson	Denmark	24.79	
29	2	Sunayna Wahi	Suriname	24.86	
30	4	Silvestra Malinauskaitė	Lithuania	25.12	
31	4	Andreea Ograzeanu	Romania	25.62	
	1	Silva Pesackaitė	Lithuania	DNS	

=== Semifinals ===
Qualification: First 4 of each semifinal qualified directly (Q) for the final.

Wind:
Heat 1: +0.8 m/s, Heat 2: -0.7 m/s

Rank	Heat	Name	Nationality	Time	Notes
1	1	Anneisha McLaughlin	Jamaica	22.98	Q
2	2	Tiffany Townsend	United States	23.20	Q
3	2	Anna Kaygorodova	Russia	23.42	Q, PB
4	1	Margaret Adeoye	Great Britain	23.45	Q
5	1	Yelizaveta Bryzhina	Ukraine	23.52	Q
6	1	Amy Foster	Ireland	23.61	Q
7	2	Anastasia Le-Roy	Jamaica	23.65	Q
8	1	Nina Argunova	Russia	23.71	
9	1	Sonia Tavares	Portugal	23.75	
10	2	Emily Diamond	Great Britain	23.82	Q
11	1	Aareon Payne	United States	23.85	
12	2	Kimberly Hyacinthe	Canada	23.90	
13	2	Gretta Taslakian	Lebanon	23.98	
14	2	Sonja van der Merwe	South Africa	23.99	
15	1	Shakera Reece	Barbados	24.13	
16	2	Maryam Tousi	Iran	24.17	

=== Final ===
Wind: +0.7 m/s

Rank	Lane	Name	Nationality	Time	Notes
1st place, gold medalist(s)	3	Anneisha McLaughlin	Jamaica	22.54	
2nd place, silver medalist(s)	4	Tiffany Townsend	United States	22.96	
3rd place, bronze medalist(s)	5	Anna Kaygorodova	Russia	23.16	PB
4	8	Yelizaveta Bryzhina	Ukraine	23.28	
5	7	Anastasia Le-Roy	Jamaica	23.32	
6	6	Margaret Adeoye	Great Britain	23.49	
7	2	Amy Foster	Ireland	23.58	
8	1	Emily Diamond	Great Britain	23.58	
