= Esther de Lange (cricketer) =

Dutch international cricketer (born 1984)

Personal information
- Full name: Esther Laura Talitha de Lange
- Born: 18 February 1984 (age 42); Amsterdam, Netherlands
- Batting: Right-handed
- Bowling: Right-arm off spin

International information
- National side: Netherlands (2005–2016)
- ODI debut (cap 64): 19 August 2005 v Ireland
- Last ODI: 24 November 2011 v Ireland
- T20I debut (cap 22): 16 October 2010 v West Indies
- Last T20I: 20 August 2011 v Ireland

Career statistics
Competition	ODI	T20I
Matches	15	6
Runs scored	74	17
Batting average	6.72	4.25
100s/50s	0/0	0/0
Top score	13*	14*
Balls bowled	544	102
Wickets	19	4
Bowling average	21.10	28.25
5 wickets in innings	0	0
10 wickets in match	0	0
Best bowling	4/43	1/5
Catches/stumpings	6/–	0/–
- Source: CricketArchive, 29 October 2015

Esther Laura Talitha de Lange (born 18 February 1984) is a former Dutch international cricketer. She played for the Netherlands women's national cricket team from 2005 to 2016. She played as a right-arm off spin bowler and was national captain in 2015 and 2016.

== Personal life ==
De Lange was born in Amsterdam, and played club cricket for Kampong CC.

== International career ==
De Lange first played for a Dutch representative team at the age of 18, when she played a single match at the 2002 European Under-21 Championship in Ireland. De Lange made her senior debut for the Netherlands at the 2005 European Championship in Wales, taking 0/20 on her ODI debut against Ireland. She did not make another appearance at that level until the 2010 edition of the same tournament, which again came against Ireland. Later in the year, de Lange was selected in the Dutch squad for the ICC Women's Challenge in South Africa, which featured five other teams playing both ODI and T20I tournaments. Against Pakistan in the ODI tournament, she took 4/43 from 10 overs, a personal best.

In April 2011, de Lange played for the Dutch side in two ODI and T20I tournaments hosted by Sri Lanka, with the other teams being Ireland, Pakistan, and Sri Lanka. Her best performance there was 3/16 in an ODI against Ireland, which the Netherlands went on to lose by only a single run. At the 2011 World Cup Qualifier in Bangladesh, she was her team's leading wicket-taker, finishing with five wickets overall and a best of 3/45 against South Africa. As a result of its failure to finish in the top six at that tournament, the Netherlands lost both its ODI status and its T20I status. In ODIs, she was ranked in the top 10 for both wickets taken and best bowling average for the Netherlands.

After the World Cup Qualifier, the next major international event for de Lange was the 2012 European T20 Championship, which saw the Netherlands qualify for the 2013 World Twenty20 Qualifier in Ireland. At the World Twenty20 Qualifier, however, she went wicketless from five matches, the only specialist Dutch bowler to do so. De Lange spent the 2013–14 Northern Hemisphere off-season playing in Australia, turning out for a Perth club, Midland-Guildford. Prior to the 2015 season, it was announced that she would replace Denise Hannema as captain of the Netherlands. Her first international tournament as captain was the 2015 World Twenty20 Qualifier in Thailand.
