= 2015 Cricket World Cup officials =

Officials for the 2015 Cricket World Cup were selected by the Umpire selection panel and the information was released on 2 December 2014. Umpire selection panel selected 20 umpires to officiate at the World Cup: five were from Australia, five from England, five from Asia, two each from New Zealand and South Africa and one from West Indies. It also selected five match referees for the event.

The umpire selection panel consisted of Geoff Allardice (ICC General Manager - Cricket), Ranjan Madugalle (ICC Chief Match Referee), David Lloyd (former player, coach, umpire and now television commentator) and Srinivas Venkataraghavan (former elite panel umpire).

== Umpires ==
Out of the selected umpires, twelve of them belong to the Elite Panel of ICC Umpires while the remaining eight belong to the International Panel of Umpires and Referees.

The members of the Elite Panel of ICC umpires are generally thought to be the best umpires in the world and hence officiate in almost all international cricket tournaments and ICC Events. The rest six of the International Panel of Umpires have been identified as emerging and talented match officials, who have already officiated at international level and are now ready to umpire in the World Cup.

Umpire	Country	Panel	Matches	WC Matches (before 2015)	2015 WC
Billy Bowden	New Zealand	Elite Panel of ICC Umpires	192	21	3
Aleem Dar	Pakistan	Elite Panel of ICC Umpires	165	22	6
Steve Davis	Australia	Elite Panel of ICC Umpires	130	10	5
Kumar Dharmasena	Sri Lanka	Elite Panel of ICC Umpires	57	5	8
Marais Erasmus	South Africa	Elite Panel of ICC Umpires	56	6	6
Ian Gould	England	Elite Panel of ICC Umpires	96	10	7
Richard Illingworth	England	Elite Panel of ICC Umpires	33	0	5
Richard Kettleborough	England	Elite Panel of ICC Umpires	48	4	9
Nigel Llong	England	Elite Panel of ICC Umpires	86	5	6
Bruce Oxenford	Australia	Elite Panel of ICC Umpires	63	5	6
Paul Reiffel	Australia	Elite Panel of ICC Umpires	37	0	4
Rod Tucker	Australia	Elite Panel of ICC Umpires	51	6	7
Johan Cloete	South Africa	International Panel of Umpires and Referees	47	0	3
Simon Fry	Australia	International Panel of Umpires and Referees	17	0	3
Chris Gaffaney	New Zealand	International Panel of Umpires and Referees	38	0	3
Michael Gough	England	International Panel of Umpires and Referees	11	0	3
Ranmore Martinesz	Sri Lanka	International Panel of Umpires and Referees	30	0	3
Ruchira Palliyaguruge	Sri Lanka	International Panel of Umpires and Referees	23	0	3
Sundaram Ravi	India	International Panel of Umpires and Referees	21	0	3
Joel Wilson	West Indies	International Panel of Umpires and Referees	18	0	3

== Referees ==
Five referees were also selected by the selection panel. All the selected referees belong to the Elite Panel of ICC Referees and are considered as the best cricket referees in the world.

Referee	Country	Matches	WC Matches (before 2015)	2015 WC
David Boon	Australia	59	0	10
Chris Broad	England	253	21	10
Jeff Crowe	New Zealand	207	21	8
Ranjan Madugalle	Sri Lanka	288	46	8
Roshan Mahanama	Sri Lanka	207	15	9
Last Updated: 21 March 2015
