= Huang Zhuo =

Chinese cricketer (born 1985)

Personal information
- Full name: Huang Zhuo
- Born: 13 August 1985 (age 41)
- Nickname: Joy
- Batting: Right-handed

International information
- National side: China
- T20I debut (cap 14): 18 February 2019 v Thailand
- Last T20I: 13 February 2024 v Oman

Career statistics
| Competition | WT20I |
|---|---|
| Matches | 18 |
| Runs scored | 202 |
| Batting average | 13.46 |
| 100s/50s | 0/0 |
| Top score | 30 |
| Catches/stumpings | 1/– |
- Source: ESPNCricinfo, 7 October 2024

Huang Zhuo (Chinese: 黄卓; pinyin: Huáng Zhuó, born 13 August 1985) is a Chinese cricketer. She captained the Chinese women's cricket team during the 2015 ICC Women's World Twenty20 Qualifier. She also represented China at the 2010 Asian Games and in the 2014 Asian Games. She made her Women's Twenty20 International (WT20I) debut for China on 18 February 2019 against Thailand, in the 2019 ICC Women's Qualifier Asia tournament.
