= 2008 World Junior Championships in Athletics – Women's 200 metres =

The women's 200 metres event at the 2008 World Junior Championships in Athletics was held in Bydgoszcz, Poland, at Zawisza Stadium on 10 and 11 July.

== Medalists ==
Gold	Sheniqua Ferguson; Bahamas
Silver	Meritzer Williams; Saint Kitts and Nevis
Bronze	Janelle Redhead; Grenada

== Results ==
=== Final ===
11 July
Wind: -0.9 m/s

Rank	Name	Nationality	Time	Notes
1st place, gold medalist(s)	Sheniqua Ferguson	Bahamas	23.24	
2nd place, silver medalist(s)	Meritzer Williams	Saint Kitts and Nevis	23.40	
3rd place, bronze medalist(s)	Janelle Redhead	Grenada	23.52	
4	Souheir Bouali	Algeria	23.58	
5	Tiffany Townsend	United States	23.64	
6	Jamile Samuel	Netherlands	23.76	
7	Anna Kiełbasińska	Poland	23.95	
8	Jura Levy	Jamaica	23.95	

=== Semifinals ===
10 July

==== Semifinal 1 ====
Wind: -1.9 m/s

Rank	Name	Nationality	Time	Notes
1	Meritzer Williams	Saint Kitts and Nevis	23.77	Q
2	Jura Levy	Jamaica	23.92	Q
3	Shaunna Thompson	United Kingdom	23.95	
4	Olivia Tauro	Australia	24.12	
5	Weronika Wedler	Poland	24.17	
6	Constance Mkenku	South Africa	24.29	
7	Sade Greene	Barbados	24.32	
8	Lara Hoffmann	Germany	24.55	

==== Semifinal 2 ====
Wind: -1.1 m/s

Rank	Name	Nationality	Time	Notes
1	Tiffany Townsend	United States	23.65	Q
2	Anna Kiełbasińska	Poland	23.80	Q
3	Kimberley Hyacinthe	Canada	23.81	
4	Ruth Spelmeyer	Germany	23.81	
5	Nivea Smith	Bahamas	23.84	
6	Gabriela Laleva	Bulgaria	24.07	
7	Alena Tamkova	Russia	24.07	
8	Niamh Whelan	Ireland	24.24	

==== Semifinal 3 ====
Wind: -0.1 m/s

Rank	Name	Nationality	Time	Notes
1	Janelle Redhead	Grenada	23.47	Q
2	Sheniqua Ferguson	Bahamas	23.49	Q
3	Jamile Samuel	Netherlands	23.57	q
4	Souheir Bouali	Algeria	23.67	q
5	Ashton Purvis	United States	23.68	
6	Andreea Ogrăzeanu	Romania	24.00	
7	Liona Rebernik	Slovenia	24.37	
	Trisha-Ann Hawthorne	Jamaica	DNS	

=== Heats ===
10 July

==== Heat 1 ====
Wind: +0.2 m/s

Rank	Name	Nationality	Time	Notes
1	Janelle Redhead	Grenada	23.66	Q
2	Ashton Purvis	United States	23.98	Q
3	Lara Hoffmann	Germany	24.20	Q
4	Tameka Williams	Saint Kitts and Nevis	24.55	
5	Allison Peter	U.S. Virgin Islands	24.61	
6	Tameka Rawlins	Barbados	24.66	
7	Natalya Tukova	Kazakhstan	25.33	

==== Heat 2 ====
Wind: -0.8 m/s

Rank	Name	Nationality	Time	Notes
1	Tiffany Townsend	United States	23.70	Q
2	Andreea Ogrăzeanu	Romania	24.14	Q
3	Liona Rebernik	Slovenia	24.30	Q
4	Loreanne Kuhurima	Netherlands	24.41	
5	Sofia Hellberg-Jonsén	Sweden	25.05	
6	Vanina Nguen	Bulgaria	25.13	
7	Olga Bludova	Kazakhstan	25.55	

==== Heat 3 ====
Wind: -1.5 m/s

Rank	Name	Nationality	Time	Notes
1	Meritzer Williams	Saint Kitts and Nevis	23.64	Q
2	Olivia Tauro	Australia	24.09	Q
3	Constance Mkenku	South Africa	24.11	Q
4	Jamile Samuel	Netherlands	24.13	q
5	Folake Akinyemi	Norway	24.50	
6	Jacqueline Gasser	Switzerland	24.83	
7	Athchima Engchuan	Thailand	26.05	

==== Heat 4 ====
Wind: -0.1 m/s

Rank	Name	Nationality	Time	Notes
1	Shaunna Thompson	United Kingdom	23.85	Q
2	Anna Kiełbasińska	Poland	23.89	Q
3	Trisha-Ann Hawthorne	Jamaica	24.12	Q
4	Alyssa Conley	South Africa	24.44	
5	Nyoka Giles	Trinidad and Tobago	24.58	
6	Margot Viot	France	24.59	
7	Meliz Redif	Turkey	24.64	
8	Marta Maffioletti	Italy	24.73	

==== Heat 5 ====
Wind: +1.8 m/s

Rank	Name	Nationality	Time	Notes
1	Nivea Smith	Bahamas	23.67	Q
2	Souheir Bouali	Algeria	23.81	Q
3	Ruth Spelmeyer	Germany	23.88	Q
4	Niamh Whelan	Ireland	24.02	q
5	Yelizaveta Bryzhina	Ukraine	24.31	
6	Lara Corradini	Italy	24.91	
7	Kirsten Niuwendam	Suriname	25.10	

==== Heat 6 ====
Wind: -0.8 m/s

Rank	Name	Nationality	Time	Notes
1	Jura Levy	Jamaica	23.82	Q
2	Sade Greene	Barbados	24.10	Q
3	Gabriela Laleva	Bulgaria	24.38	Q
4	Wendy Pascal	France	24.68	
5	Tassporn Wannakit	Thailand	24.86	
6	Carmen Sánchez	Spain	24.92	
7	Valentine Arrieta	Switzerland	24.93	

==== Heat 7 ====
Wind: -1.4 m/s

Rank	Name	Nationality	Time	Notes
1	Sheniqua Ferguson	Bahamas	23.74	Q
2	Kimberley Hyacinthe	Canada	24.00	Q
3	Alena Tamkova	Russia	24.04	Q
4	Weronika Wedler	Poland	24.14	q
5	Viktorya Pyatachenko	Ukraine	24.53	
6	Estela García	Spain	24.67	
7	Yen Tai-Ting	Chinese Taipei	25.57	
8	Shashipraba Jayasinghe	Sri Lanka	25.62	

== Participation ==
According to an unofficial count, 51 athletes from 34 countries participated in the event.

- Algeria (1)
- Australia (1)
- Bahamas (2)
- Barbados (2)
- Bulgaria (2)
- Canada (1)
- Chinese Taipei (1)
- France (2)
- Germany (2)
- Grenada (1)
- Ireland (1)
- Italy (2)
- Jamaica (2)
- Kazakhstan (2)
- Netherlands (2)
- Norway (1)
- Poland (2)
- Romania (1)
- Russia (1)
- Saint Kitts and Nevis (2)
- Slovenia (1)
- South Africa (2)
- Spain (2)
- Sri Lanka (1)
- Suriname (1)
- Sweden (1)
- Switzerland (2)
- Thailand (2)
- Trinidad and Tobago (1)
- Turkey (1)
- Ukraine (2)
- United Kingdom (1)
- United States (2)
- U.S. Virgin Islands (1)
