= Ian Lewis (cricketer) =

Irish cricketer (1935–2004)

Personal information
- Batting: Right-handed
- Relatives: Alan Lewis (son); Gaby Lewis (granddaughter); Robyn Lewis (granddaughter)

International information
- National side: Ireland

Career statistics
Competition	First-class
Matches	5
Runs scored	67
Batting average	6.70
100s/50s	0/0
Top score	20
Catches/stumpings	2/–
- Source: CricketArchive, 16 November 2022

William Ian Lewis (29 September 1935 – 20 November 2004), usually known by his middle name, was an Irish cricketer. A right-handed batsman, he played twenty times for the Ireland cricket team between 1955 and 1973 including five first-class matches. He was born and died in Dublin, Ireland. His son, Alan, and granddaughters, Robyn and Gaby Lewis, also played cricket for Ireland.

== Playing career ==
Though his last match for Ireland was just over eighteen years after his first, he was never a regular member of the side, regularly being absent from the national side for long periods. His debut was against the MCC at Lord's in September 1955 and his first-class debut came the following June against Scotland. He played twice more in 1956; against Sussex and the MCC, and twice in 1957; against Scotland and the MCC before the first substantial gap in matches.

It would be almost three years before he returned to the Irish side, playing a match against Leicestershire in August 1960, before another gap, this time for almost two years, playing against Pakistan in June 1962. He played four times for Ireland in 1963, including two matches against the West Indies, before his longest gap in appearances, this time for seven years.

He returned to international duty for a match against the Combined Services in August 1970, playing against the MCC the following month. Matches against the Netherlands, the Combined Services and the MCC followed in 1971, before his final first-class match against Scotland in June 1972. His last match for Ireland was against Canada at the Toronto Cricket, Skating and Curling Club in September 1973. He later served as president of the Irish Cricket Union in 1989.

=== Statistics ===
In all matches for Ireland, Lewis scored 353 runs at an average of 12.61, with a top score of 41 against the West Indies in June 1963. He never bowled for Ireland. His top first-class score was 20 against Scotland, whom he played against in all but one of his first-class matches.
