= Robyn Lewis (cricketer) =

Irish cricketer

Personal information
- Full name: Robyn Allana Lewis
- Born: 21 July 1999 (age 27); Dublin, Ireland
- Batting: Right-handed
- Bowling: Slow left-arm orthodox
- Role: Bowler
- Relatives: Alan Lewis (father); Ian Lewis (grandfather); Gaby Lewis (sister)

International information
- National side: Ireland (2015–2017)
- ODI debut (cap 79): 8 February 2017 v Sri Lanka
- Last ODI: 15 February 2017 v Bangladesh
- T20I debut (cap 34): 5 December 2015 v Bangladesh
- Last T20I: 26 March 2016 v Australia

Domestic team information
- Years: Team
- 2015: Scorchers
- 2016–2020: Typhoons
- 2022: Typhoons

Career statistics
Competition	WODI	WT20I	WLA	WT20
Matches	2	3	23	22
Runs scored	2	5	129	112
Batting average	1.00	1.66	7.58	11.20
100s/50s	0/0	0/0	0/0	0/0
Top score	2	4	38	40
Balls bowled	30	30	773	288
Wickets	1	1	14	13
Bowling average	28.00	37.00	37.14	24.53
5 wickets in innings	0	0	0	0
10 wickets in match	0	0	0	0
Best bowling	1/19	1/21	3/18	2/8
Catches/stumpings	0/–	0/–	2/–	1/–
- Source: CricketArchive, 27 May 2021

Robyn Allana Lewis (born 21 July 1999) is an Irish cricketer who plays as a slow left-arm orthodox bowler. Between 2015 and 2017, she appeared in 2 One Day Internationals and 3 Twenty20 Internationals for Ireland. She has played domestic cricket for Scorchers and Typhoons.

Lewis was born in Dublin. Her younger sister, Gaby Lewis, has played alongside her both at club and national level, while her father, Alan Lewis, and grandfather, Ian Lewis, both represented the Irish men's side. Both members of Dublin's YMCA Cricket Club, the Lewis sisters first came to attention in November 2013, when they were named in Cricket Ireland's Emerging Players Squad. Having played for Ireland A in 2013, Lewis was first called up to Ireland's senior team in July 2014, playing a match against Somerset in an English county competition. Her international debut came in November 2015, against the Netherlands at the 2015 World Twenty20 Qualifier. In the final of the tournament, against Bangladesh, Lewis made her Twenty20 International debut.

She made her Women's One Day International cricket (WODI) debut against Sri Lanka in the 2017 Women's Cricket World Cup Qualifier on 8 February 2017.
