= Tiffany Townsend =

American sprinter

Personal information
- Nationality: American
- Born: June 14, 1989 (age 37) Lake City, Florida
- Height: 1.67 m (5 ft 6 in)

Sport
- Country: United States
- Sport: Track, Sprinting events
- Events: 100 meters, 200 meters, 60 meters
- College team: Baylor University
- Team: Adidas
- Turned pro: 2011

Tiffany Townsend (born June 14, 1989) is an American track and field sprinter who competes in the 100 and 200-meter dash. She has personal records of 11.13 and 22.26 seconds for the events, respectively.

She won medals for the United States in age category competitions, taking a relay gold at the 2008 World Junior Championships in Athletics, two gold medals at the 2010 NACAC Under-23 Championships in Athletics, and two silver medals at the 2011 Summer Universiade. She competed collegiately for Baylor University and was third in the 200 m at the 2011 NCAA Outdoor Championships. Her highest international ranking for the 200 m is third, achieved in the 2013 season.

== Career ==
=== Early life and family ===
Born in Lake City, Florida to Tyrone Townsend and Vicki Seymour, she grew up in Killeen, Texas. She has two brothers and is the cousin of Olympic sprinter Dannette Young. Townsend began to establish herself as a sprinter at Killeen High School with Texas state records of 11.21 seconds for the 100 m and 22.84 seconds for the 200 m in 2007. At the USATF Junior Olympics she was runner-up in the 100 m and winner of the 200 m. She also performed well in her studies, qualifying for a scholarship from the Texas Scholar program.

=== College career ===
Following her graduation from high school she stayed in-state and enrolled at Baylor University to study exercise physiology. In her first indoor season for the Baylor Bears collegiate team she earned All-American honours for the tenth-place finish in the 200 m at the 2008 NCAA Women's Indoor Track and Field Championships. She was eighth in that event at the NCAA Women's Outdoor Track and Field Championships, and also won All-American honours for top four placings with both the 4×100-meter relay and the 4×400-meter relay teams. A win in the 200 m at the USATF Junior Outdoor Championships brought her selection for the 2008 World Junior Championships in Athletics, where she came fifth in the 200 m final and won a gold medal as part of a 4×100 m relay team led off by Jeneba Tarmoh. She ran a 200 m personal record of 22.75 seconds at the Big 12 Conference Outdoor Championships.

The following year she had top three places in both short sprints at the Big 12 Outdoor Championships and ran a school a personal record of 11.13 seconds for the 100 m at the Texas Relays. At the 2009 NCAA Outdoor meet she was fifth in the 200 m as well as a top-five placer in both the relays. Her 2010 season was highlighted by four podium finishes at the Big 12 Outdoor Championships in the individual sprints and relays, then a fourth-place finish at the NCAA Outdoor 200 m. At the 2010 NACAC Under-23 Championships in Athletics she took two gold medals, winning the 200 m and the 4×100 m relay (again running with Jeneba Tarmoh). In her final year at the university she reached the 200 m podium at the 2011 NCAA Outdoor Championships, running a personal record of 22.58 seconds to take third and end the competition with a career total of 17 All America honours. This time ranked her twelfth in the world that year for the discipline. After the end of the college season she represented the United States at the 2011 Universiade in Shenzhen and won two silver medals, one in the 200 m and one with the 4×100 m relay team.

=== Professional career ===
After graduating from Baylor University, she started sprinting professionally and gained a sponsorship deal with adidas. She made her debut on the 2012 IAAF Diamond League circuit at the Shanghai Golden Grand Prix, taking sixth in the 200 m. She has a season's best in the 100 m in April, running a time of 11.22 seconds. She entered the 2012 United States Olympic Trials, was eliminated in the 200 m semi-finals, her run of 22.96 seconds being her best effort that year.

Townsend again failed to gain selection for the senior championships in 2013, as at the 2013 USA Outdoor Track and Field Championships she was a 100 m semi-finalist and came seventh in the 200 m. The following month, however, she propelled herself towards the top of the international rankings with a 200 m time of 22.26 seconds to narrowly finish behind Murielle Ahouré at the Herculis Diamond League meeting. By the end of the season this time had only been bettered by Shelly-Ann Fraser-Pryce and Ahouré – the top two finishers in the event at the 2013 World Championships in Athletics.

With no major events to aim for in 2014, she fell back down the rankings – her best of 22.72 seconds being enough for 27th in the world. Townsend ran the 200 meters in 23.16 to place 10th and did not make a final at the 2014 USA Outdoor Track and Field Championships.

Townsend earned bronze in the 4x200 meters at 2017 IAAF World Relays. Townsend earned a lane in the 100 meters and 200 meters respectively ran 11.25 in 22nd place and 23.17 in 17th place at the 2017 USA Outdoor Track and Field Championships.

== Personal records ==
- 100-meter dash – 11.13 (2009)
- 200-meter dash – 22.26 (2013)
- 60-meter dash (indoor) – 7.23 (2011)
- 200-meter dash (indoor) – 22.90 (2011)
- 300-meter dash (indoor) – 36.74 (2015)

== International competitions ==
Year	Competition	Venue	Position	Event	Notes
2008	World Junior Championships	Bydgoszcz, Poland	5th	200 m	23.64 (wind: -0.9 m/s)
2008	World Junior Championships	Bydgoszcz, Poland	1st	4 × 100 m relay	43.66
2010	NACAC U23 Championships	Miramar, Florida, United States	1st	200m	22.92 (wind: +2.1 m/s) w
2010	NACAC U23 Championships	Miramar, Florida, United States	1st	4 × 100 m relay	43.07
2011	Universiade	Shenzhen, China	2nd	200 m	22.96 (wind: +0.7 m/s)
2011	Universiade	Shenzhen, China	2nd	4 × 100 m relay	43.48
2017	2017 IAAF World Relays	Nassau, Bahamas	3rd	4x200 m	1:30.87
