= Carmela Appel =

Dutch international cricketer (born 1996)

Carmela Violette Appel (born 4 August 1996, in Utrecht) is a Dutch international cricketer. She has played 2 Women's One-day match and 5 Women's Twenty20. She made her debut in international cricket for Netherlands national women's cricket team in 2015 ICC Women's World Twenty20 Qualifier on 1 December 2015.
