= China women's national cricket team =

Cricket team

China
- Association: Chinese Cricket Association

Personnel
- Captain: Mingyue Zhu

International Cricket Council
- ICC status: Associate member (2017); Affiliate member (2004)
- ICC region: Asia
ICC Rankings	Current	Best-ever
T20I	47th	25th (26 Feb 2019)

International cricket
- First international: Scotland at Shanghai Cricket Club, Shanghai; September 2006

T20 Internationals
- First T20I: v South Korea at Yeonhui Cricket Ground, Incheon; 3 November 2018
- Last T20I: v Malaysia at Bayuemas Oval, Pandamaran; 22 November 2026
T20Is	Played	Won/Lost
Total	68	30/35 (2 ties, 1 no result)
This year	19	7/10 (1 tie, 1 no result)
- T20 World Cup Qualifier appearances: 1 (first in 2015)
- Best result: 6th (2015)
T20I home kit
T20I away kit
- As of 22 November 2026

The China women's national cricket team represents China in international women's cricket matches. The team is organised by the Chinese Cricket Association and made its official international debut in 2007.

== History ==
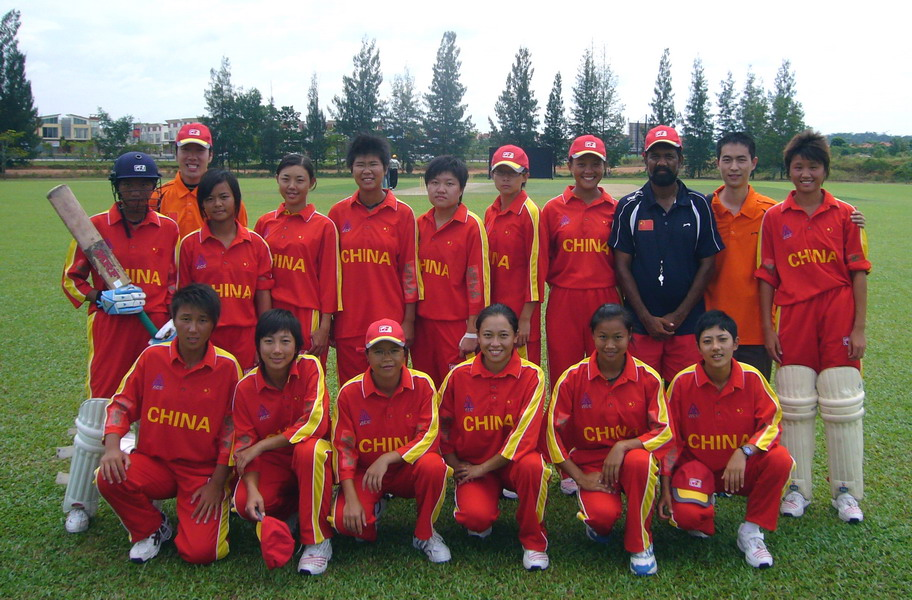
The China women's national cricket team in 2007

The Chinese women cricketers made their international debut in September 2006 in a Sixes game against Scotland in Shanghai, losing by 59 runs. However, the side was not recognised by the Chinese Cricket Association as the official team.

The official Chinese women's national team was incepted in May 2007. After the National Cricket Tournament Final, a total of 21 girls from 19 school teams were gathered in Shenzhen and underwent vigorous centralised training before a final 14-player squad was sent to Bangkok for the ACC Women's Tournament 2007. The team managed to reach the semi-finals.

The team was coached by Rashid Khan and captained by MEI Chun-hua, a right arm fast-bowler and final year student from the Shanghai Tongji University. Other notable players included Wang Meng, a consistent fast bowler and HU Tingting, who turned up to be the best batsman for China during the ACC Tournament. Both Wang and HU were students from the Shenyang Sports Institute.

In April 2018, the International Cricket Council (ICC) decided to grant full Women's Twenty20 International (WT20I) status to all its members. Therefore, all Twenty20 matches played between China women and other ICC members after 1 July 2018 have been full WT20I.

On 13 January 2019, in their match against the Arab Emirates, the team was bowled out for 14 runs, at the time the lowest total in a Women's T20I match.

In December 2020, the ICC announced the qualification pathway for the 2023 ICC Women's T20 World Cup. China were named in the 2021 ICC Women's T20 World Cup Asia Qualifier regional group, alongside seven other teams.

== Tournament history ==
=== Asia Cup ===
Year	Round	Position	GP	W	L	T	NR
(Sri Lanka) 2004	Did not participate						
(Pakistan) 2005–06	Did not participate						
(India) 2006	Did not participate						
(Sri Lanka) 2008	Did not participate						
(China) 2012	Group stages	–	3	1	2	0	0
(Thailand) 2016	Did not participate						
(Malaysia) 2018	Did not participate						
(Bangladesh) 2022	Did not participate						
(Sri Lanka) 2024	Did not participate						
Total	1/9	–	3	1	2	0	0

=== Asian Games ===
Year	Round	Position	GP	W	L	T	NR
(China) 2010	4th place	4/7	5	2	3	0	0
(South Korea) 2014	4th place	4/9	5	3	2	0	0
(China) 2022	Did not participate						
(Japan) 2026	5th place	5/8	1	0	0	0	1
Total	3/4	–	11	5	5	0	1

=== T20 World Cup Qualifier ===
Year	Position	GP	W	L	T	NR
(Republic of Ireland) 2013	Did not participate					
(Thailand) 2015	6/8	3	1	2	0	0
(Netherlands) 2018	Did not participate					
Total		3	1	2	0	0

=== T20 World Cup Asia Qualifier ===
Year	Position	GP	W	L	T	NR
(Thailand) 2019	4/7	6	3	3	0	0
(United Arab Emirates) 2021	Did not participate					
(Malaysia) 2023	9/11	4	1	3	0	0
Total		10	4	6	0	0

=== Premier Cup ===
Year	Round	Position	GP	W	L	T	NR
(Malaysia) 2024	Group stages	12/16	3	1	2	0	0
Total			3	1	2	0	0

=== East Asia Cup ===
Source
Year	Round	Position	GP	W	L	T	NR
(Japan) 2015	Champions	1/4	4	4	0	0	0
(Hong Kong) 2017	3rd place	4/4	3	0	2	0	1
(South Korea) 2019	Champions	1/4	4	3	1	0	0
(Japan) 2022	Did not participate						
(South Korea) 2024	3rd-place	3/5	4	2	2	0	0
Total			15	9	5	0	1

== Records and statistics ==
International Match Summary — China Women

Last updated 22 November 2026

Playing Record
Format	M	W	L	T	NR	Inaugural Match
Twenty20 Internationals	68	30	35	2	1	3 November 2018

=== Twenty20 International ===
- Highest team total: 132/6 v. South Korea on 20 September 2019 at Yeonhui Cricket Ground, Incheon.
- Highest individual score: 55, Zhang Chan v. South Korea on 3 November 2018 at Yeonhui Cricket Ground, Incheon.
- Best individual bowling figures: 5/15, Xiuli Jin v. Kuwait on 31 August 2023 at Bayuemas Oval, Klang.

Most T20I runs for China Women

Player	Runs	Average	Career span
Mingyue Zhu (朱明月)	441	14.22	2023–2026
Wang Huiying	367	19.31	2024–2026
Han Lili (韩丽丽)	272	16.00	2019–2024
Wei Haitang	225	9.00	2024–2026
Jiaping Li	205	7.06	2023–2026

Most T20I wickets for China Women

Player	Wickets	Average	Career span
Mengting Liu (刘梦婷)	53	7.81	2023–2025
Ma Ruike (马瑞克)	40	14.07	2024–2026
Xu Qian (徐谦)	33	14.72	2018–2025
Wang Huiying	26	20.96	2024–2026
Cai Yuzhi	25	15.00	2024–2026

T20I record versus other nations

Records complete to WT20I #3088. Last updated 22 November 2026.

Opponent	M	W	L	T	NR	First match	First win
vs Associate Members
Hong Kong	15	4	10	1	0	19 February 2019	19 February 2019
Indonesia	5	3	2	0	0	26 May 2026	26 May 2026
Japan	6	2	4	0	0	21 September 2019	21 September 2019
Kuwait	2	1	1	0	0	21 February 2019	21 February 2019
Malaysia	5	1	3	1	0	16 January 2019	22 February 2019
Mongolia	5	5	0	0	0	8 October 2024	8 October 2024
Myanmar	3	2	1	0	0	4 September 2023	4 September 2023
Namibia	1	0	1	0	0	5 December 2024	
Nepal	4	1	3	0	0	12 January 2019	31 May 2026
Oman	4	3	1	0	0	13 February 2024	13 February 2024
Philippines	3	3	0	0	0	4 June 2025	4 June 2025
Saudi Arabia	1	0	0	0	1	9 June 2026	
South Korea	6	5	1	0	0	3 November 2018	3 November 2018
Thailand	4	0	4	0	0	18 February 2019	
United Arab Emirates	4	0	4	0	0	12 January 2019	

== Current squad ==
- Huang Zhuo (c)
- Caiyun Zhao
- Chai Yudian (柴雨点) (wk)
- Han Lili
- Li Yingying
- Liu Jie
- Reziye
- Song Yang Yang
- Sun Meng Yao (孙梦瑶)
- Tian Qi
- Wang Meng
- Wu Juan
- Xiang Ruan (阮香)
- Zhao Ning (赵宁)

== See also ==
- List of China women Twenty20 International cricketers
- Chinese men's cricket team
- Chinese Cricket Association
- Asian Cricket Council
