= Norma Ovasuru =

Papua New Guinean cricketer (born 1989)

Personal information
- Born: 10 July 1989 (age 37); Port Moresby, Papua New Guinea

International information
- National side: Papua New Guinea
Medal record
Representing Papua New Guinea
Women's Cricket
Pacific Games
Silver medal – second place	2015 Port Moresby	20 over cricket
- Source: ESPNcricinfo, 13 February 2017

Norma Ovasuru (born 10 July 1989) is a Papua New Guinean cricketer. She played for the Papua New Guinea women's national cricket team in the 2017 Women's Cricket World Cup Qualifier in February 2017.
