= Zhang Chan =

Chinese cricketer (born 1997)

Personal information
- Born: 7 November 1997 (age 29)
- Batting: Right-handed
- Bowling: Right-arm medium
- Role: Wicket-keeper

International information
- National side: China (2018–present)
- T20I debut (cap 9): 3 November 2018 v South Korea
- Last T20I: 22 September 2019 v Hong Kong

Career statistics
Competition	WT20I
Matches	16
Runs scored	164
Batting average	12.61
100s/50s	0/1
Top score	55
Catches/stumpings	5/5
- Source: ESPN Cricinfo

Zhang Chan (born 7 November 1997) is a Chinese cricketer who plays for the China women's national cricket team in domestic and international cricket in Women's Twenty20. She made her international cricket debut in 2018 when the Chinese women's team toured South Korea.

A right-handed batter and wicket-keeper, she was also a part of China vs Kuwait Women's Twenty20 International (WT20I) game held in 2019 at Yeonhui Cricket Ground. She played her last WT20I on 22 September 2019 against Hong Kong in Incheon, South Korea. She was a part of China Women's team in the 2019 ICC Women's Qualifier Asia.
