= Wang Meng (cricketer) =

Chinese cricketer (born 1988)

Personal information
- Born: 21 June 1988 (age 38)
- Nickname: Mong Mong
- Batting: Right-handed
- Bowling: Right-arm medium
- Role: Bowler

International information
- National side: China (2019–present)
- T20I debut (cap 17): 18 February 2019 v Thailand
- Last T20I: 22 September 2019 v Hong Kong

Career statistics
Competition	WT20I
Matches	9
Runs scored	5
Batting average	2.50
100s/50s	0/0
Top score	3
Balls bowled	176
Wickets	10
Bowling average	9.90
5 wickets in innings	0
10 wickets in match	0
Best bowling	3/8
Catches/stumpings	4/–
- Source: ESPNcricinfo, 30 April 2021

Wang Meng (王萌, born 21 June 1988) is a Chinese cricketer who represents the China women's national cricket team in domestic and international cricket in Women's Twenty20 cricket. She made her international cricket debut in 2018 when the Chinese women's team toured South Korea.

A right-handed batter and right-arm medium-fast bowler, she was also a part of the China vs Japan Women's Twenty20 International (WT20I) held in September 2019 in Incheon. She played her last WT20I against Hong Kong Women at Incheon on September 22, 2019.
