= Sainammin Saenya =

Thai cricketer (born 1998)

Personal information
- Born: 30 August 1998 (age 28)
- Batting: Right-handed
- Role: Wicket-keeper

International information
- National side: Thailand
- T20I debut (cap 9): 3 June 2018 v Pakistan
- Last T20I: 27 February 2019 v UAE

Career statistics
Competition	WT20I
Matches	15
Runs scored	2
Batting average	-
100s/50s	0/0
Top score	2*
Balls bowled	26
Wickets	3
Bowling average	3.00
5 wickets in innings	0
10 wickets in match	0
Best bowling	1/0
Catches/stumpings	0/–
Medal record
Representing Thailand
Women's Cricket
Southeast Asian Games
Gold medal – first place	2017 Kuala Lumpur	Twenty20
- Source: Cricinfo, 27 February 2019

Sainammin Saenya (Thai:สายน้ำมิ้น แสนยะ, born 30 August 1998) is a Thai cricketer. She played for the Thailand women's national cricket team in the 2017 Women's Cricket World Cup Qualifier in February 2017. In June 2018, she was named in Thailand's squad for the 2018 ICC Women's World Twenty20 Qualifier tournament. She made her Women's Twenty20 International (WT20I) debut for Thailand against Pakistan on 3 June 2018, in the 2018 Women's Twenty20 Asia Cup.
