= List of China women Twenty20 International cricketers =

This is a list of Chinese women Twenty20 International cricketers. A Twenty20 International (T20I) is an international cricket match between two representative teams, each having Twenty20 International status, as determined by the International Cricket Council (ICC). A T20I is played under the rules of Twenty20 cricket.

This list includes all players who have played at least one T20I match and is initially arranged in the order of debut appearance. Where more than one player won their first cap in the same match, their names are initially listed alphabetically at the time of debut.

== Key ==
General

- ‡ – Captain
- † – Wicket-keeper
- First – Year of debut
- Last – Year of latest game
- Mat – Number of matches played

Batting

- Runs – Runs scored in career
- HS – Highest score
- Avg – Runs scored per dismissal
- * – Batsman remained not out
- 50 – Number of half centuries

Bowling

- Wkt – Wickets taken in career
- BBI – Best bowling in an innings
- Ave – Average runs per wicket

Fielding

- Ca – Catches taken
- St – Stumpings affected

== Players ==
Statistics are correct as of 24 August 2026.

China women T20I cricketers
General					Batting				Bowling				Fielding		Ref
No.	Name	First	Last	Mat	Runs	HS	Avg	50	Balls	Wkt	BBI	Ave	Ca	St	Ref
1	Han Lili	2018	2024	27	272	45*	16.00	0	357	19	2/11	12.36	10	0	
2	Li Haoye‡	2018	2019	14	23	15*	5.75	0	328	14	2/10	17.07	2	0	
3	Liu Min	2018	2019	5	0	0*	–	0	31	1	1/24	58.00	1	0	
4	Lyu Ping	2018	2019	5	6	4*	3.00	0	–	–	–	–	0	0	
5	Qing Yi	2018	2018	3	–	–	–	–	24	1	1/20	20.00	0	0	
6	Wang Luo Wanyu	2018	2019	6	47	31*	9.40	0	42	3	2/19	16.00	0	0	
7	Xu Qian‡	2018	2025	35	80	16	4.44	0	719	33	3/5	14.72	16	0	
8	Ying Zhou	2018	2019	5	11	8	2.75	0	–	–	–	–	0	0	
9	Zhang Chan†	2018	2019	16	164	55	12.61	1	–	–	–	–	5	5	
10	Zhang Xiangxue	2018	2024	11	15	13	3.75	0	160	6	1/5	23.83	0	0	
11	Zhang Yanling†	2018	2019	6	42	16*	10.50	0	–	–	–	–	0	0	
12	Zhang Hui Yue	2018	2019	4	0	0	0.00	0	18	0	–	–	0	0	
13	Liu Chang	2019	2019	2	1	1*	1.00	0	18	0	–	–	0	0	
14	Huang Zhuo‡	2019	2024	18	202	30	13.46	0	–	–	–	–	1	0	
15	Liu Jie	2019	2019	10	17	14*	17.00	0	227	10	3/17	13.10	0	0	
16	Fengfeng Song	2019	2019	10	69	25*	9.85	0	53	6	4/7	5.33	2	0	
17	Wang Meng	2019	2019	9	5	3	2.50	0	176	10	3/8	9.90	4	0	
18	Wu Juan	2019	2019	10	7	4	1.75	0	216	12	3/5	9.50	3	0	
19	Zhang Mei	2019	2019	10	149	35	18.62	0	–	–	–	–	3	0	
20	Zheng Lili	2019	2024	15	54	30	4.50	0	214	4	2/10	39.00	4	0	
21	Caiyun Zhou	2019	2023	14	149	20	11.46	0	–	–	–	–	1	0	
22	Chen Yue	2019	2023	6	50	28*	12.50	0	–	–	–	–	1	0	
23	Sun Meng Yao	2019	2024	7	131	49*	21.83	0	–	–	–	–	0	0	
24	Chen Xinyu	2023	2026	23	77	13*	5.92	0	180	9	3/3	18.55	5	0	
25	Jiaping Li	2023	2026	37	205	23	7.06	0	322	13	2/8	22.76	5	0	
26	Jing Yang†	2023	2024	18	93	19	7.15	0	–	–	–	–	4	3	
27	Mengting Liu	2023	2025	29	104	23	6.11	0	618	53	4/1	7.81	9	0	
28	Rongyu Zhao	2023	2023	7	54	13	9.00	0	–	–	–	–	2	0	
29	Xiuli Jin	2023	2023	9	46	10	5.75	0	153	10	5/15	11.30	1	0	
30	Yuanyuan Cai	2023	2023	9	48	14*	12.00	0	137	9	3/6	10.33	1	0	
31	Mingyue Zhu	2023	2026	41	441	59	14.22	1	466	21	4/16	17.71	11	0	
32	Zi Mei†	2023	2025	21	181	43*	12.06	0	–	–	–	–	7	5	
33	Wenjing Yin	2023	2024	3	4	3	1.33	0	18	0	–	–	0	0	
34	Zhi Xinyu	2024	2024	3	5	5*	5.00	0	–	–	–	–	0	0	
35	Yang Yu Xuan	2024	2024	2	0	0	0.00	0	48	3	2/16	9.66	0	0	
36	Cai Yuzhi	2024	2026	38	189	22	8.21	0	425	25	4/10	15.00	8	0	
37	Ma Ruike	2024	2026	38	67	12	5.58	0	697	40	4/1	14.07	4	0	
38	Wang Huiying	2024	2026	38	367	50*	19.31	1	673	26	3/8	20.96	4	0	
39	Wei Haiting	2024	2026	33	225	26	9.00	0	12	0	–	–	6	0	
40	Yang Shen	2024	2024	5	2	1*	2.00	0	84	4	1/8	15.75	0	0	
41	Yan Zuying	2024	2025	15	32	14	3.55	0	–	–	–	–	0	0	
42	Gong Yuting	2024	2026	34	145	15	8.52	0	145	3	1/3	42.33	6	0	
43	Zhang Yibing	2024	2024	3	0	0	0.00	0	–	–	–	–	0	0	
44	Peng Liangyu†	2025	2025	6	10	9*	–	0	–	–	–	–	1	0	
45	Sinan Wen†	2025	2025	4	9	9	9.00	0	–	–	–	–	0	0	
46	Xie Wenyan	2025	2026	8	1	1	0.33	0	–	–	–	–	2	0	
47	Zhao Yihan	2025	2026	16	8	5*	4.00	0	280	14	2/10	14.92	4	0	
48	Jiang Chunquin†	2026	2026	7	0	0*	0.00	0	–	–	–	–	0	5	
49	Feng Qian	2026	2026	11	14	7*	3.50	0	–	–	–	–	2	0	
50	Hong Yali	2026	2026	10	5	5	2.50	0	–	–	–	–	2	0	
51	Lyu Yihan	2026	2026	6	4	4	4.00	0	6	0	–	–	3	0	
