= Geoff Allardice =

Australian cricketer and administrator

Chief Executive Officer International Cricket Council
- In office 2021–2025
- Preceded by: Manu Sawhnay
- Succeeded by: Sanjog Gupta

Personal information
- Full name: Geoffrey John Allardice
- Born: 7 May 1967 (age 59); Melbourne, Australia
- Batting: Right-handed
- Role: Batsman

Domestic team information
- Years: Team
- 1991/92–1993/94: Victoria
- Source: Cricinfo, 24 February 2015

Geoffrey John Allardice (born 7 May 1967) is an Australian administrator and former cricketer, who is the former CEO of the International Cricket Council.

== Administrative career ==
He was appointed acting CEO of the ICC in March 2021, taking on the role in a permanent capacity in November 2021. He was also general manager of cricket until Wasim Khan was appointed in April 2022. Allardice had been part of the selection panel to appoint officials for the 2015 Cricket World Cup.

Allardice played 14 first-class cricket matches for Victoria between 1991 and 1994.
