= Catherine Dalton =

Irish cricketer

Personal information
- Full name: Catherine Clare Dalton
- Born: 24 October 1992 (age 34); Leyton, Essex, England
- Batting: Right-handed
- Bowling: Right-arm fast
- Role: Batter

International information
- National side: Ireland (2015–2016)
- ODI debut (cap 75): 5 August 2016 v South Africa
- Last ODI: 11 August 2016 v South Africa
- T20I debut (cap 33): 5 December 2015 v Bangladesh
- Last T20I: 23 March 2016 v South Africa

Domestic team information
- Years: Team
- 2007–2011: Essex
- 2012–2018: Middlesex
- 2015–2016: Typhoons
- 2019–present: Essex

Career statistics
Competition	WODI	WT20I	WLA	WT20
Matches	4	4	66	50
Runs scored	59	14	1,115	595
Batting average	14.75	3.50	27.19	18.03
100s/50s	0/0	0/0	0/5	0/3
Top score	20	5	89*	70*
Balls bowled	–	–	366	128
Wickets	–	–	8	3
Bowling average	–	–	39.00	48.33
5 wickets in innings	–	–	0	0
10 wickets in match	–	–	0	0
Best bowling	–	–	2/22	2/30
Catches/stumpings	0/–	0/–	20/–	8/–
- Source: CricketArchive, 28 May 2021

Catherine Clare Dalton (born 24 October 1992) is an Irish cricketer who currently plays for Essex in English domestic cricket. She plays as a right-handed batter. Dalton gained Irish citizenship in 2015, and was subsequently named in the Irish national team's squad for the 2015 World Twenty20 Qualifier in Thailand. She made her Twenty20 International debut in the tournament's final, against Bangladesh, and went on to make 4 appearances in One Day Internationals and 4 in Twenty20 Internationals for Ireland in 2015 and 2016. She has previously played for Middlesex in England and Typhoons in Ireland.

== Biography ==
Dalton is a fast bowler and top order batswoman who spent 2011 and 2012 on the England Academy. A former West Ham United and Tottenham Hotspur footballer, Dalton focused her efforts on cricket and in 2009 was selected for an international cricket camp in Potchefstroom, South Africa.

After a year with Essex, where she averaged in excess of 100 with the bat in 2010, she was selected for the ECB Academy at Loughborough. The following year, following a lack of opportunities for Essex at county level, Dalton played for Middlesex and Finchley Women in 2012. She also played men's cricket for Hutton CC in Essex.

In 2013, she was named Middlesex Player of the Year. She finished fifth in the ECB National Batting Averages, and was the only non-full international in the Top 10. Despite this, she didn't gain further England recognition.

Playing for Halstead men's team against Felixstowe in 2015, Catherine became the first female on record to score a 100 in The Two Counties men's cricket leagues.

By the end of the 2015, Dalton gained Irish citizenship and committed her international future to Ireland. She was initially called up for the World Cup qualifiers in Thailand before playing for Ireland in the T20 ICC World Cup in India in 2016.

In 2019 she returned to play at Essex. In an ECB Premier League match for Finchley CC, she hit an unbeaten 214 vs Bishop's Stortford - a competition record.

She is assistant head coach of The National Fast Bowling Academy, based at Herts & Essex Cricket Centre in Sawbridgeworth. In 2023 Multan Sultans appointed Dalton as fast bowling coach for the Pakistan Super League.

== Education and qualifications ==
Dalton is an ECB level 3 coach and has a degree from St Mary's University College, London. She is assistant coach at The Ultimate Pace Foundation which has hosted camps in Bangalore, Delhi, Gurgaon, Pune & Hyderabad.
