= Olivia Rae =

Scottish cricketer (born 1988)

Personal information
- Full name: Olivia Sophie Margaret Rae
- Born: 14 April 1988 (age 38); Durham, England
- Batting: Right-handed
- Bowling: Right-arm medium
- Role: Batter

Domestic team information
- Years: Team
- 2006–2009: Durham
- 2014/15: Canterbury
- 2018: Berkshire
- 2019–2020: Middlesex
- 2021: Berkshire

Career statistics
Competition	WLA	WT20
Matches	49	37
Runs scored	711	303
Batting average	19.75	12.62
100s/50s	0/2	0/0
Top score	76	44*
Balls bowled	743	32
Wickets	22	1
Bowling average	21.90	30.00
5 wickets in innings	0	0
10 wickets in match	0	0
Best bowling	3/17	1/6
Catches/stumpings	9/–	2/–
- Source: CricketArchive, 20 April 2022

Olivia Sophie Margaret Rae (born 14 April 1988) is a Scottish cricketer who plays primarily as a right-handed batter. She played for the Scotland women's national cricket team between 2010 and 2017, including playing in the 2017 Women's Cricket World Cup Qualifier in February 2017. She has played domestic cricket for Durham, Berkshire, Middlesex and Canterbury.
