= Han Lili =

Chinese cricketer (born 1990)

Personal information
- Born: 10 June 1990 (age 36)
- Nickname: Tom
- Batting: Right-handed
- Bowling: Right-arm legbreak
- Role: All-rounder

International information
- National side: China (2018–present)
- T20I debut (cap 1): 3 November 2018 v South Korea
- Last T20I: 13 February 2024 v Oman

Career statistics
Competition	WT20I
Matches	27
Runs scored	272
Batting average	16.00
100s/50s	0/0
Top score	45*
Balls bowled	357
Wickets	19
Bowling average	12.36
5 wickets in innings	0
10 wickets in match	0
Best bowling	2/11
Catches/stumpings	10/0
- Source: ESPN Cricinfo, 7 October 2024

Han Lili (韩丽丽; born 10 June 1990) is a Chinese cricketer who represents the China women's national cricket team in domestic and international cricket in Women's Twenty20 cricket. She made her international cricket debut in 2018 when the Chinese women's team toured South Korea.

A right-handed batsman with legbreak bowling style, she was also a part of China Women vs Kuwait Women in Women's Twenty20 International format held in 2019 in Bangkok. She played her last match in September 2019 during WT20I's tournament between China Women and Hong Kong Women organised at Yeonhui Cricket Ground.

== Career ==
She played in the 2012 Women's Twenty20 Asia Cup and subsequently participated in the 2014 Asian Games Women's cricket competition. While representing China, she was also a part of the 2017 Women's Twenty20 East Asia Cup.
