= Li Yingying (cricketer) =

Chinese cricketer

Personal information
- Full name: Li Yingying
- Bowling: Right-arm off spin
- Role: Bowler

International information
- National side: China
- Source: Cricinfo, June 10 2017

Li Yingying (李莹莹) is a Chinese cricketer who plays for the China women's national cricket team.

An off spin bowler, Li starred for China in the ICC Women's World Cup Asia Qualifier 2016 in Hong Kong on 11 October 2016, by taking 5–12 against Nepal. Two days later, on 13 October 2016, she took 3–16 in China's match against previously unbeaten Thailand, in which China registered its first win of the tournament.

The following month, Brisbane Heat signed Li as its Associate Rookie for the Women's Big Bash League Twenty20 competition's WBBL|02 season in 2016–17.
